= 1961 SCCA National Sports Car Championship =

Seasons
- ← 1960 1962 →

The 1961 SCCA National Sports Car Championship season was the eleventh season of the Sports Car Club of America's National Sports Car Championship. It began February 5, 1961, and ended September 23, 1961, after thirteen races.

== Classes ==
The class structure was changed to allow certain cars to be moved out of their displacement class, based on past performance. The nominal class structure was as follows:

Class	Modified	Production
B	5000-8000cc	3500-5000cc
C	3000-5000cc	2700-3500cc
D	2000-3000cc	2000-2700cc
E	1500-2000cc	1600-2000cc
F	1100-1500cc	1300-1600cc
G	750-1100cc	1000-1300cc
H	500-750cc	750-1000cc
I	under 500cc	under 750cc

== Schedule ==
Rnd	Race	Length^{A}	Circuit	Location	Date
1	SCCA National Races	175 km (109 mi)	Daytona International Speedway	Daytona Beach, Florida	February 5
2	Governor's Cup	68 mi (109 km)	Marlboro Motor Raceway	Upper Marlboro, Maryland	April 16
3	President's Cup	3 hours	Virginia International Raceway	Danville, Virginia	April 30
4	Cumberland National Championship Sports Car Races	45 minutes	Greater Cumberland Regional Airport	Wiley Ford, West Virginia	May 15
5	Bridgehampton National Event	70 mi (110 km)	Bridgehampton Race Circuit	Bridgehampton, New York	May 28
6	International June Sprints	300 mi (480 km)	Road America	Elkhart Lake, Wisconsin	June 17
7	National Races Lime Rock	46 mi (74 km)	Lime Rock Park	Lakeville, Connecticut	July 1
8	Meadowdale SCCA National Championship Races	40 mi (64 km)	Meadowdale International Raceway	Carpentersville, Illinois	July 23
9	Bridgehampton National Races	70 mi (110 km)	Bridgehampton Race Circuit	Bridgehampton, New York	August 5
10	National Races Indianapolis Raceway Park GP	62 mi (100 km)	Indianapolis Raceway Park	Clermont, Indiana	August 20
11	SCCA National Races	30 mi (48 km)	Thompson International Speedway	Thompson, Connecticut	September 4
12	Road America 500	500 mi (800 km)	Road America	Elkhart Lake, Wisconsin	September 10
13	Watkins Glen Grand Prix	100 mi (160 km)	Watkins Glen International	Watkins Glen, New York	September 23

^A Feature race

== Season results ==
Feature race overall winners in bold.

Rnd	Circuit	AP Winning Team	BM Winning Team	BP Winning Team	CM Winning Team	CP Winning Team	DM Winning Team	DP Winning Team	EM Winning Team	EP Winning Team	FM Winning Team	FP Winning Team	GM Winning Team	GP Winning Team	HM Winning Team	HP Winning Team	IM Winning Team	Results
Rnd	Circuit	AP Winning Driver(s)	BM Winning Driver(s)	BP Winning Driver(s)	CM Winning Driver(s)	CP Winning Driver(s)	DM Winning Driver(s)	DP Winning Driver(s)	EM Winning Driver(s)	EP Winning Driver(s)	FM Winning Driver(s)	FP Winning Driver(s)	GM Winning Driver(s)	GP Winning Driver(s)	HM Winning Driver(s)	HP Winning Driver(s)	IM Winning Driver(s)	Results
1	Daytona	unknown	unknown	Chevrolet	Lister-Chevrolet	unknown	unknown	unknown	**Porsche**	unknown	unknown	unknown	unknown	unknown	unknown	unknown	unknown	Results
1	Daytona	unknown	unknown	(United States) Bob Johnson	(United States) Art Huttinger	unknown	unknown	unknown	**(United States) Bob Holbert**	unknown	unknown	unknown	unknown	unknown	unknown	unknown	unknown	Results
2	Marlboro	#229 Ferrari	no entries	#137 Chevrolet	^{A}	#4 Daimler	#621 J. Frank Harrison	#42 Siata	**#14 Porsche**	#000 Elva	^{B}	#108 Porsche	#2 Lola	#55 Lotus	#22 Bandini-Saab	#51 Fiat-Abarth	no finishers	Results
2	Marlboro	(United States) Bob Bucher	no entries	(United States) Harold Keck	^{A}	(United States) Duncan Black	(United States) Fred Gamble	(United States) Douglas Diffenderfer	**(United States) Bob Holbert**	(United States) Mark Donohue	^{B}	(United States) William Haenelt	(United States) M. R. J. Wyllie	(United States) Gene Hobbs	(United States) Dave Lang	(United States) Ben Poster	no finishers	Results
3	VIR	no entries	no finishers	#13 Chevrolet	no finishers	#59 A.C.-Bristol	**#60 Briggs Cunningham**	#125 Alfa Romeo	#14 Porsche	#000 Elva	^{C}	#110 Porsche	#2 Lola	#290 Alfa Romeo	#76 Osca	#139 Fiat-Abarth	#72 Berkeley	Results
3	VIR	no entries	no finishers	(United States) Bob Johnson	no finishers	(United States) Pierre Mion	**(United States) Walt Hansgen**	(United States) Chuck Stoddard	(United States) Bob Holbert	(United States) Mark Donohue	^{C}	(United States) Erskine Ingram	(United States) M. R. J. Wyllie	(United States) Bill Kane	(United States) Oliver Schmidt	(United States) Ray Stoutenburg	(United States) Phil Jeffreys	Results
4	Cumberland	no entries	no finishers	#1 Don Yenko	#151 Arthur Faust	#4 Duncan Black	#17 J. Frank Harrison	#152 William Malion	**#14 Bob Holbert**	#000 Mark Donohue	#29 Bob Bucher	#243 Ben Fowke	#2 M. R. J. Wyllie	#153 Al Weaver	#52 J. F. Lang	#44 Rod Harmon	^{D}	Results
4	Cumberland	no entries	no finishers	(United States) Don Yenko	(United States) Bud Faust	(United States) Duncan Black	(United States) Fred Gamble	(United States) Bill Malion	**(United States) Bob Holbert**	(United States) Mark Donohue	(United States) Bob Bucher	(United States) Ben Fowke	(United States) M. R. J. Wyllie	(United States) Al Weaver	(United States) Dave Lang	(United States) Rod Harmon	^{D}	Results
5	Bridgehampton	#13 Ferrari	#73 Lister-Costin Buick	#149 Chevrolet	#25 Lister-Chevrolet	#4 Daimler	**#60 Briggs Cunningham**	#127 Alfa Romeo	#140 Porsche	#000 Elva	#129 Porsche	#174 Sports Car Forum	#85 Lotus	#26 Alfa Romeo	#951 Osca	#82 Fiat-Abarth	no entries	Results
5	Bridgehampton	(United States) Bob Grossman	(United States) Gerry Georgi	(United States) Don Yenko	(United States) Pete Harrison	(United States) Traver McKenna	**(United States) Walt Hansgen**	(United States) Reed Rollo	(United States) Bob Holbert	(United States) Mark Donohue	(United States) Bob Bucher	(United States) Don Sesslar	(United States) Barry Brown	(United States) Bill Kane	(United States) John Igleheart	(United States) Paul Richards	no entries	Results
6	Road America	#7 Ferrari	#1 Harry J. Heuer	**#11 Don Yenko**	^{E}	#59 Hank Mergner	#6 John M. Wyatt, III	#13 Sheldon Brown	#99 Frank Zillner	#47 Ernie Harris	#13 Tom Payne	#75 William C. Kravas	#2 M. R. J. Wyllie	#26 Allan Jacobson	#76 Oliver C. Schmidt	#14 Rod Harmon	no entries	Results
6	Road America	(United States) Charlie Hayes (United States) Carl Haas	(United States) Harry Heuer	**(United States) Don Yenko** **(United States) Ed Lowther**	^{E}	(United States) Pierre Mion	(United States) Roger Penske	(United States) Sheldon Brown (United States) Ernie Erickson	(Canada) Peter Ryan	(United States) Ernie Harris (United States) Lee Wilson	(United States) Tom Payne	(United Kingdom) William Kravas	(United States) M. R. J. Wyllie	(United States) Bill Kane	(United States) Oliver Schmidt	(United States) Rod Harmon	no entries	Results
7	Lime Rock	#61 Ferrari	#75 Lister-Costin Buick	#22 Chevrolet	#87 Lister-Costin Chevrolet	#4 Daimler	**#6 Maserati**	#22 Alfa Romeo	^{F}	#00 Elva	#13 Porsche	#68 Turner	#57 Lola	#1 Alfa Romeo	#76 Lola-Osca	#43 Austin-Healey	no entries	Results
7	Lime Rock	(United States) Charlie Hayes	(United States) Gerry Georgi	(United States) Don Yenko	(United States) Pete Harrison	(United States) Duncan Black	**(United States) Roger Penske**	(United States) Chris Noyes	^{F}	(United States) Mark Donohue	(United States) Tom Payne	(United States) Skip Barber	(United States) Charles Kurtz	(United States) Jack Crusoe	(United States) Oliver Schmidt	(United States) Rod Harmon	no entries	Results
8	Meadowdale^{G}	#5 Ferrari	#50 Comstock Racing Team	#36 Chevrolet	#87 Lister-Chevrolet	#32 Arnolt-Bristol	**#6 Maserati**	#8 Alfa Romeo	#77 Concours Motors	#000 Elva	#13 Porsche	#70 Porsche	#2 Lola-Climax	#15 Alfa Romeo	#76 Lola-Osca	#24 Fiat-Abarth	#124 Berkeley	Results
8	Meadowdale^{G}	(United States) Denise McCluggage	(Canada) Peter Ryan	(United States) Bob Spooner	(United States) Pete Harrison	(United States) Ralph Durbin	**(United States) Roger Penske**	(United States) Chuck Stoddard	(United States) Bill Wuesthoff	(United States) Mark Donohue	(United States) Tom Payne	(United States) Harold Zimdars	(United States) M. R. J. Wyllie	(United States) Al Weaver	(United States) Oliver Schmidt	(United States) Larry Isenring	(United States) George Bachelder	Results
9	Bridgehampton	#9 Ferrari	no entries	#11 Grady Davis	#14 Lister-Corvette	#59 A.C.-Bristol	**#60 Briggs Cunningham**	#75 Alfa Romeo	^{H}	#000 Elva	#29 Porsche	#37 D.B.	#74 Lola	#5 Alfa Romeo	#76 Lola-Osca	#41 Austin-Healey	no entries	Results
9	Bridgehampton	(United States) Bob Grossman	no entries	(United States) Dick Thompson	(United States) Art Huttinger	(United States) Pierre Mion	**(United States) Walt Hansgen**	(United States) Ralph Troiano	^{H}	(United States) Mark Donohue	(United States) Bob Bucher	(United States) Howard Hanna	(United States) William Wilbourne	(United States) Al Weaver	(United States) Oliver Schmidt	(United States) Rod Harmon	no entries	Results
10	IRP	no entries	#28 Gates Chevrolet	#11 Chevrolet	#127 Corvette Special	#59 A.C.-Bristol	**#60 Briggs Cunningham**	#12 Porsche	#14 Porsche	#47 Elva	#61 Porsche	#177 Porsche	#57 Lola	#180 Alfa Romeo	#76 Lola-Osca	#1 Fiat-Abarth	no finishers	Results
10	IRP	no entries	(United States) Bud Gates	(United States) Dick Thompson	(United States) Robert Ruth	(United States) Pierre Mion	**(United States) Walt Hansgen**	(United States) Bill Romig	(United States) Bob Holbert	(United States) Ernie Harris	(United States) Ed Haussermann	(United States) Tom Peacock	(United States) Charles Kurtz	(United States) Lynn Blanchard	(United States) Oliver Schmidt	(United States) Larry Isenring	no finishers	Results
11	Thompson	Ferrari	Meister Brauser	Chevrolet	^{I}	A.C.-Bristol	John Bunch	Porsche	**#14 Porsche**	Elva	Porsche	Porsche	Lola	Alfa Romeo	Osca	Fiat-Abarth	no entries	Results
11	Thompson	(United States) Bob Hathaway	(United States) Harry Heuer	(United States) Dick Thompson	^{I}	(United States) Pierre Mion	(United States) George Constantine	(United States) George Frey	**(United States) Bob Holbert**	(United States) Jay Signore	(United States) Bob Bucher	(United States) Brad Howes	(United States) Charles Kurtz	(United States) Dick Haselton	(United States) John Igleheart	(United States) Paul Richards	no entries	Results
12	Road America	#1 Charles Hayes	#91 Scott Beckett	#11 I. Grady Davis	#87 Pete Harrison	#59 Henry E. Mergner	**#61 Briggs Cunningham**	Alfa Romeo	#63 Briggs Cunningham	Elva	#73 Tom Payne	Porsche	#14 Richard P. Buedingen	Alfa Romeo	Lola	Fiat-Abarth	no entries	Results
12	Road America	(United States) Charlie Hayes	(United States) Scott Beckett (United States) Dewey Brohaugh	(United States) Dick Thompson	(United States) Pete Harrison (United States) Art Huttinger	(United States) Pierre Mion	**(United States) Walt Hansgen** **(United States) Augie Pabst**	(United States) Chuck Stoddard	(United States) John Fitch (United States) Briggs Cunningham (United States) Dick Thompson	(United States) Ernie Harris	(United States) Tom Payne (United States) Ed Fuchs	(United States) Dick Brakenridge	(United States) Dick Buedingen (United States) Carl Haas	(United States) Lynn Blanchard	(United States) Oliver Schmidt	(United States) Larry Isenring	no entries	Results
13	Watkins Glen	#245 Robert Grossman	#1 Meister Brauser	#213 I. Grady Davis	#68 O & M Racing Team	#21 Daimler	**#20 John T. Bunch**	#303 Alfa Romeo	#140 Robert Holbert	#82 Elva	#29 J. Robert Bucher	#350 MG	#2 Lola-Climax	#258 Alfa Romeo	#219 Lola-Osca	#187 Fiat-Abarth	#251 Berkeley	Results
13	Watkins Glen	(United States) Bob Grossman	(United States) Harry Heuer	(United States) Dick Thompson	(United States) Bob Colombosian	(United States) Gary Morgan	**(United States) George Constantine**	(United States) Reed Rollo	(United States) Bob Holbert	(United States) Jay Signore	(United States) Bob Bucher	(United States) Sherman Decker	(United States) M. R. J. Wyllie	(United Kingdom) Robert Bowers	(United States) Oliver Schmidt	(United States) Paul Richards	(United States) Phillips Jeffrey	Results

^A C and D Modified were classified together at Marlboro; the combined class was won by Fred Gamble's DM Maserati Tipo 61. The highest-finishing CM car was Bud Faust's Ferrari-Chevrolet in 2nd.
^B F Modified were classified with E Modified at Marlboro.
^C F Modified were classified with E Modified at VIR.
^D I Modified were classified with H Modified at Cumberland.
^E C Modified were classified with B Modified at the Road America June Sprints.
^F E Modified were classified with D Modified at Lime Rock Park.
^G A 'Guest' class also ran at Meadowdale, and was won by Augie Pabst in a Ferrari 625 TR.
^H E and F Modified were classified together at Bridgehampton (August); the combined class was won by Bob Bucher's FM Porsche. The highest-finishing EM car was Henry Schwartz's Porsche in 3rd.
^I C and D Modified were classified together at Thompson; the combined class was won by George Constantine's DM Ferrari.

== Champions ==
Class	Driver	Car
A Production	(United States) Bob Hathaway	Ferrari 250 GT SWB Berlinetta
B Modified	(United States) Harry Heuer	Scarab Mk II-Chevrolet
B Production	(United States) Dick Thompson	Chevrolet Corvette
C Modified	(United States) Pete Harrison	Lister-Costin Jaguar, Lister-Costin Chevrolet
C Production	(United States) Pierre Mion	AC Ace-Bristol
D Modified	(United States) Roger Penske	Maserati Tipo 61, Cooper Monaco T61-Climax
D Production	(United States) Chuck Stoddard	Alfa Romeo Giulietta Veloce
E Modified	(United States) Bob Holbert	Porsche 718 RS 60, RS 61
E Production	(United States) Mark Donohue	Elva Courier
F Modified	(United States) Bob Bucher	Porsche 718 RSK
F Production	(United States) Howard Hanna	D.B. Coupe
G Modified	(United States) Charles Kurtz	Lola Mk1
G Production	(United States) Al Weaver	Alfa Romeo Giulietta Spider
H Modified	(United States) Oliver Schmidt	Osca, Lola Mk1-Osca
H Production	(United States) Rod Harmon	Austin-Healey Sprite
I Modified	(United States) Phillips Jeffrey	Berkeley
