= 1961 International June Sprints =

The June 18, 1961, race at Road America at Elkhart Lake, WI was the sixth racing event of the eleventh season of the Sports Car Club of America's 1961 Championship Racing Series.

== Results ==
Div.	Finish	Driver	Car Model	Car #	Comments
BP	1st	Don Yenko	Corvette	11	
BP	2d	Dick Lang	Corvette	85	
AP	3rd	Hayes & Hass	Ferrari 250 GT	7	1st in AP
BP	4th	Hap Sharp	Ferrari 250 GT California	95	
BP	5th	Tom Terrell Jr.	Corvette	5	
BP	6th	Don Skogmo	Corvette	91	
BP	7th	Richard C. Gaard	Corvette	63	
