= KIC =

KIC may represent:

- The IATA airport code for Mesa Del Rey Airport
- The ICAO airline code for Kiwi Travel International Airlines
- The ISO 639-3 language code for the Kickapoo language
- Kashyap information criterion
- Kepler Input Catalog of stars
- Ketchikan Indian Community, a federally recognized tribe in Alaska
- KIC Motorsport
- Korea International Circuit
- Korea Investment Corporation
- Kansas Insurance Commissioner
- Kohler International Challenge
- Kobe Institute of Computing
- Knowledge and Innovation Community, see European Institute of Innovation and Technology

== See also ==
- KICS
