= 1961 Indianapolis Raceway Park Grand Prix =

The August 20, 1961, race at Indianapolis Raceway Park was the tenth racing event of the eleventh season of the Sports Car Club of America's 1961 Championship Racing Series.

B Production Results

Div.	Finish	Driver	Car Model	Car #
BP	1st	Dick Thompson	Corvette	11
BP	2d	Dick Lang	Corvette	85
BP	3rd	Bob Johnson	Corvette	3
BP	4th	J. Kaser	Corvette	58
BP	5th	Nate Karras	Corvette	49
BP	6th	Harold Keck	Corvette	19
BP	7th	Roy Kumnick	Corvette	40
