= 1961 Meadowdale SCCA National Championship Races =

The July 23, 1961, race at Meadowdale International Raceway was the eighth racing event of the eleventh season of the Sports Car Club of America's 1961 Championship Racing Series.

A&B Production Results

Div.	Finish	Driver	Car Model	Car #	Comments
AP	1st	Denise McCluggage	Ferrari 250 GT	5	First in A Production
BP	2d	Bob Spooner	Corvette	36	First in B Production
BP	3rd	Dick Lang	Corvette	85	
BP	4th	Nate Karras	Corvette	49	
BP	5th	Roy Kumnick	Corvette	40	
BP	6th	Harold Keck	Corvette	46	
BP	7th	Tom Terrell	Corvette	53	
BP	8th	George Reed	Ferrari 250 GT California	195	
BP	9th	I.G. Davis	Corvette	22	
EP	10th	Mark Donohue	Elva Courier	000	1st in experimental
