= Lister Knobbly =

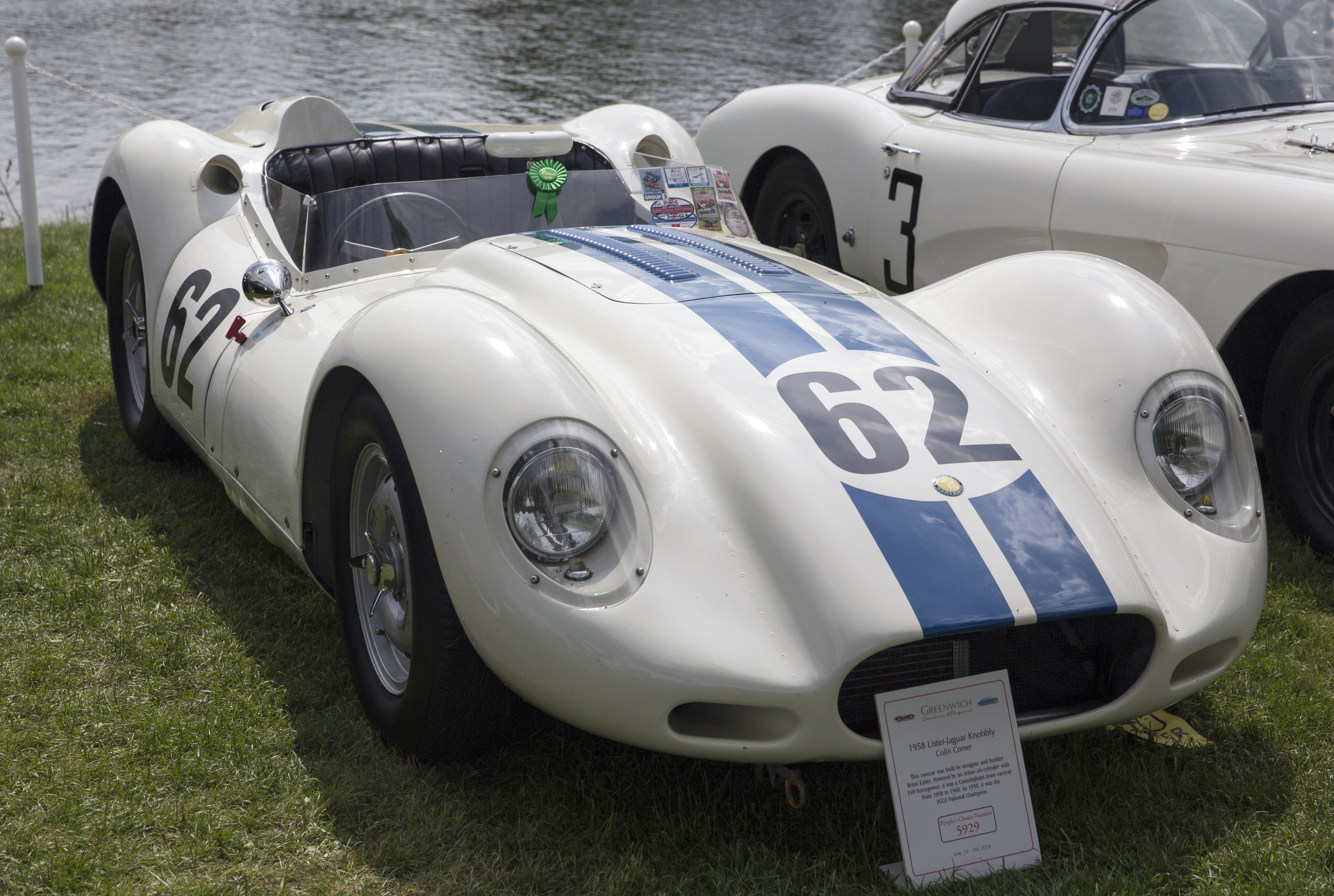
- Category: Sports car
- Constructor: Lister
- Successor: Lister Costin

Technical specifications
- Chassis: Steel-reinforced tubular space frame covered in aluminum panels
- Suspension (front): Double wishbones, coil springs over telescopic shock absorbers
- Suspension (rear): DeDion axle, twin trailing arms, coil springs over telescopic shock absorbers
- Length: 4,115–4,120 mm (162.0–162.2 in)
- Width: 1,588–1,590 mm (62.5–62.6 in)
- Height: 990–991 mm (39.0–39.0 in)
- Wheelbase: 2,305–2,337 mm (90.7–92.0 in)
- Engine: Front-engine, longitudinally mounted, 3.8–5.4 L (232–330 cu in), Jaguar XK/Chevrolet, I-6/V-8, NA
- Transmission: 4-speed manual
- Power: 306–350 hp (228–261 kW)
- Weight: 1,808–1,984 lb (820–900 kg)

Competition history

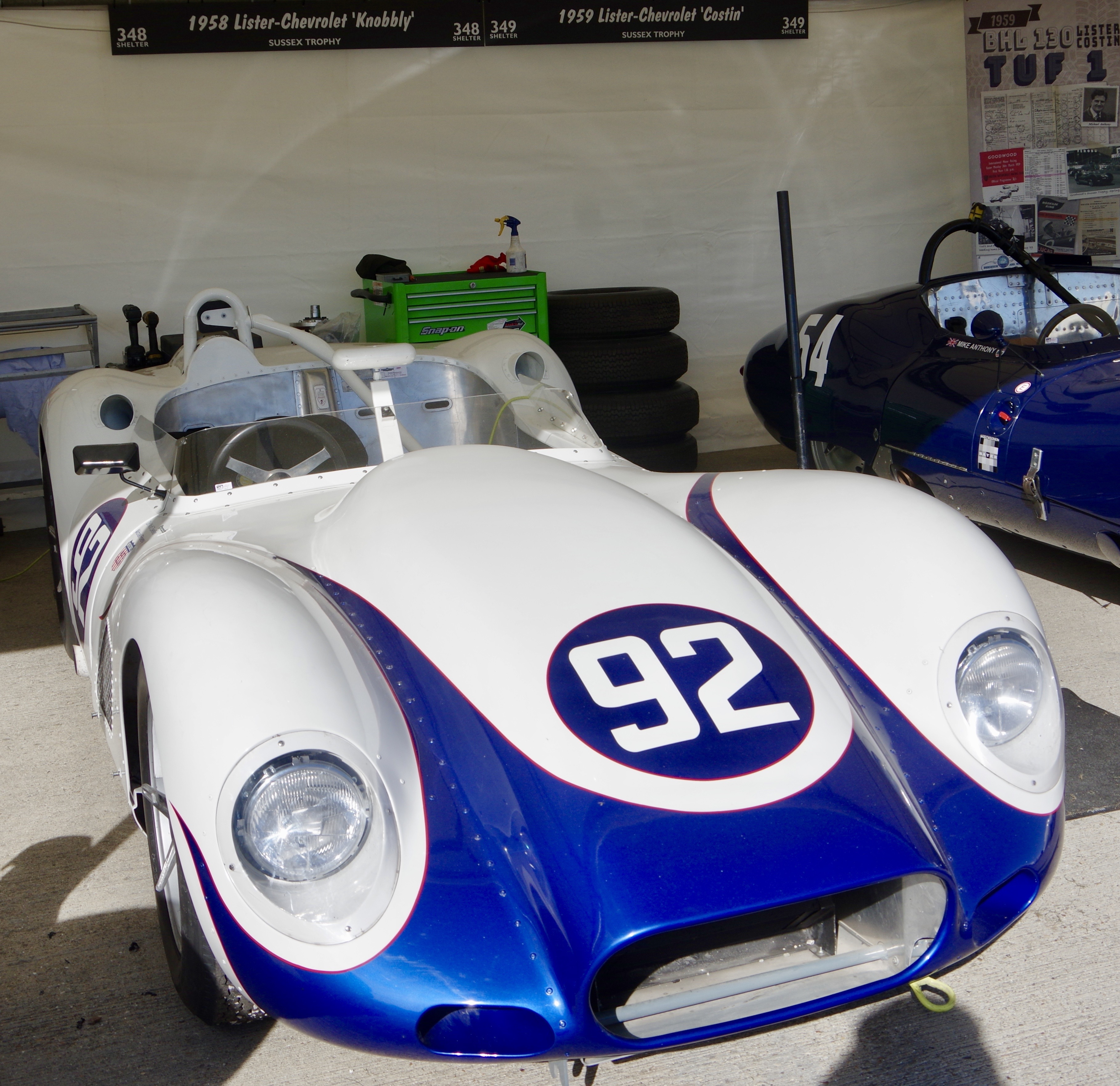
Lister Chevrolet Knobbly

The Lister Knobbly is a lightweight sports racing car, designed, developed and built by the British car manufacturer Lister, which was originally produced between 1957 and 1959. The nickname "Knobbly" came from the distinctive but odd curved design of the bodywork, giving the car a unique shape. It was powered by either Jaguar straight-6 or a larger Chevrolet small-block engine.
