= 1961 Bridgehampton National Races =

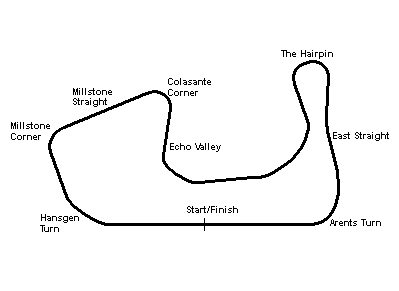
Layout of the Bridgehampton Raceway

The August 5, 1961, race at Bridgehampton Raceway was the ninth racing event of the eleventh season of the Sports Car Club of America's 1961 Championship Racing Series.

A, B, & C Production Results
(Race Results)

Div.	Finish	Driver	Car Model	Car #	Comments
AP	1st	Bob Grossman	Ferrari 250 GT	9	First in A Production
AP	2d	Charlie Hayes	Ferrari 250 GT	115	
BP	3rd	Dick Thompson	Corvette	11	First in B Production
AP	4th	Bob Hathaway	Ferrari 250 GT	86	
BP	5th	Grady Davis	Corvette	0	
BP	6th	Frank Dominianni	Corvette	69	
BP	7th	Ben Moore	Corvette	8	
BP	8th	Harold Keck	Ferrari 250 GT California	146	
BP	9th	Bruce Jennings	Porsche 356	77	
CP	10th	Pierre Mion	AC - Bristol	59	1st in C Prod
CP	11th	John Howe	Jaguar XK120	24	
CP	12th	Gerry Georgi	Daimler	91	
CP	13th	Duncan Black	Daimler SP250	4	
CP	14th	Harvey Marks	Porsche 356	155	
BP	15th	Tom Kerr	Corvette	39	
