= Lola T120 =

Lola T120 (BMW G767)
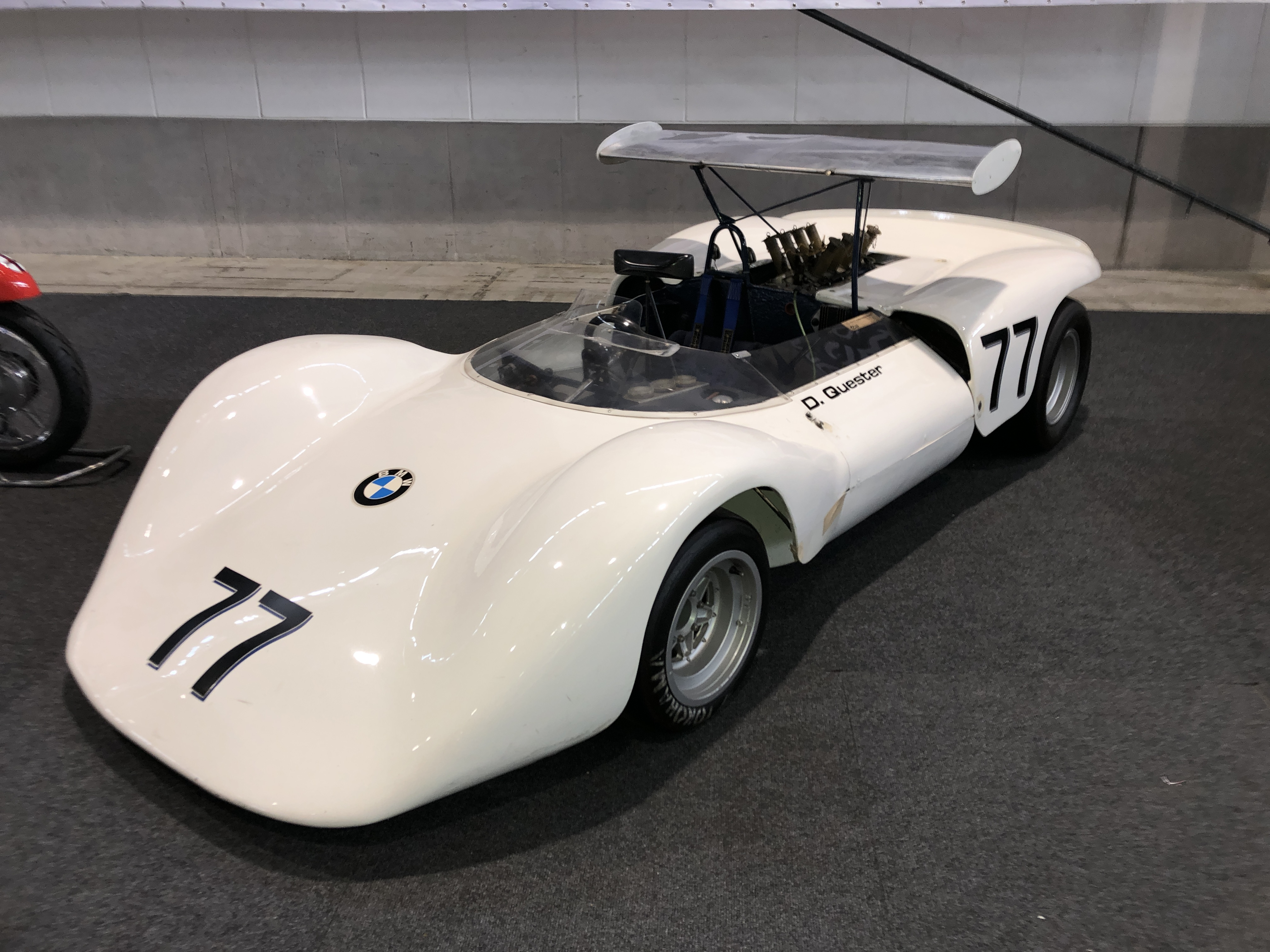
- Category: Group 7 (Hillclimbing)
- Constructor: Lola
- Designer(s): Eric Broadley
- Predecessor: Lola Mk1
- Successor: Lola T210

Technical specifications
- Chassis: Fiberglass body over tubular spaceframe
- Suspension (front): double wishbones, coil springs over shock absorbers, anti-roll bar
- Suspension (rear): reversed lower wishbones, top links, coil springs over shock absorbers
- Engine: BMW Apfelbeck 1,990 cc (2 L; 121 cu in) straight-four engine naturally-aspirated mid-engined
- Power: 260–280 hp (190–210 kW)

Competition history
- Notable drivers: Dieter Quester

The Lola T120, also known as the BMW G767, was a Group 7 sports prototype race car, designed, developed and built by British manufacturer Lola, specifically to compete in hill climb racing, in 1967. It was powered by a unique 2-liter, 16-valve, four-cylinder engine, designed by Ludwig Apfelbeck, to produce between 260 and 280 hp @ 8500 rpm, and was itself based on the M10 engine.
