= 1961 Road America 500 =

Track map of Road America.

The September 9, 1961, race at Road America 500 was the twelfth racing event of the eleventh season of the Sports Car Club of America's 1961 Championship Racing Series.
SCCA National Road America Results [AP+BP+CP]

Div.	Finish	Driver	Car Model	Car #	Comments
AP	1st	Charlie Hayes	Ferrari 250 GT	1	First in A Production
BP	2d	Dick Thompson	Corvette	115	First in B Production
BP	3rd	Dick Lang	Corvette	85	
BP	4th	Ralph Salyer	Corvette	25	
BP	5th	Doug Thiem	Corvette	88	
BP	6th	Walter Smejkal	Corvette	21	
BP	7th	Tom Terrell	Corvette	55	
BP	8th	Nate Karras	Corvette	49	
BP	9th	Grady Davis	Corvette	12	
BP	10th	Chuck Rickert	Porsche 356 Carrera	10	
CP	11th	Pierre Mion	A.C. - Bristol	59	First in C Prod.
BP	12th	Gene Cormany	Corvette	9	
CP	13th	Tom Payne	Arnolt - Bristol	33	
CP	14th	Paul Padrutt	Daimler SP250	96	
BP	15th	H. Hutcheson	Porsche 356 Carrera	?	
CP	16th	Bill Strand	Porsche 356	17	
CP	17th	Richard Holquist	Porsche 356	8	
CP	18th	Jack Cooper	Porsche 356	7	
BP	19th	Richard Jordan	Corvette	5	
