= SportsCar Endurance Grand Prix =

Sports car race held in Elkhart Lake, Wisconsin

Motul SportsCar Endurance Grand Prix

IMSA WeatherTech SportsCar Championship
- Venue: Road America
- First race: 1950
- First IMSA race: 2014
- Duration: 6 hours
- Previous names: Elkhart Lake Road Race (1950–1951); Elkhart Lake Cup (1952); Elkhart Lake's Road America Road Race (1955); Road America 6 Hours (1956); Road America 500 (1957–1968); Pabst 500 (1979–1983); Budweiser 500 (1984); Löwenbräu Classic (1985–1987); Miller High Life 500 (1988–1989); Chicago Tribune presents the Nissan Grand Prix of Road America (1990); Nissan Grand Prix of Road America (1991–1992); Piggly Wiggly Grand Prix 500 Kilometers (1993); Sargento Road America 500 (2000–2001); Road America 500 presented by the Chicago Tribune (2002–2004); Generac 500 (2005–2008); Time Warner Cable Road Race Showcase (2009, 2011); American Le Mans Series powered by eStar (2010); Road America Road Race Showcase (2012); Orion Energy Systems 245 (2013); Continental Road Race Showcase (2014–2018); Road Race Showcase at Road America (2019); IMSA SportsCar Weekend (2020–2021, 2023–2024); IMSA Fastlane SportsCar Weekend (2022); Motul SportsCar Grand Prix (2025); Motul SportsCar Endurance Grand Prix (2026)
- Most wins (driver): Augie Pabst; Chuck Parsons; Geoff Brabham; Lucas Luhr; Ricky Taylor (3)
- Most wins (team): Briggs Cunningham Racing Team; Team Penske (4)
- Most wins (manufacturer): Porsche (11)

The Motul SportsCar Endurance Grand Prix is a sports car race held at Road America in Elkhart Lake, Wisconsin.

== History ==
The event began in 1950, for in 1951 it was added to the SCCA National Sports Car Championship and was contested for the final time on the roads around the village and lake of Elkhart Lake, Wisconsin. Following a spectator death at the 1952 Watkins Glen Grand Prix, racing on open roads was discouraged, and the race went into a hiatus until 1955, when Road America was opened. In 1963, the race shifted to the new United States Road Racing Championship, until the USRRC's demise happened in 1968.

After an 11-year hiatus, the IMSA GT Championship revived the event in 1979. After running as a 500 mile event beginning in 1957, IMSA shortened the race to 500 kilometres (310 mi) in 1988, and again 3 years later in 1991 to 300 kilometres (190 mi). The race was shortened to 2 hours in 1992. After a return to a 500-km distance, the race was cancelled in 1994. It was revived once again in the year 2000, by the Grand American Road Racing Championship, to a 500-mile distance. The race was an American Le Mans Series event from 2002 until 2013, having been run at varying race distances of either 2 hours and 45 minutes or 4 hours.

In 2014 the race joined the schedule of the WeatherTech SportsCar Championship after the merger of the American Le Mans Series and the Rolex Sports Car Series was contested at IMSA's standard sprint race duration of 2 hours and 40 minutes. In 2026, the race was extended to a 6 hour endurance race and became part of IMSA's Michelin Endurance Cup.

== Winners ==
=== Elkhart Lake road circuit ===
Date	Overall winner(s)	Entrant	Car	Distance/Duration	Race title	Report
Non-championship
1950	(United States) Jim Kimberly	(United States) Jim Kimberly	Ferrari 166 MM	100 miles (160 km)	Elkhart Lake Road Race	report
SCCA National Sports Car Championship
1951	(United States) John Fitch	(United States) Briggs Cunningham	Cunningham C-2R	200 miles (320 km)	Elkhart Lake Road Race	report
1952	(United States) John Fitch	(United States) Briggs Cunningham	Cunningham C-4R-Chrysler	200 miles (320 km)	Elkhart Lake Cup	report

=== Road America ===
Date	Overall winner(s)	Entrant	Car	Distance/Duration	Race title	Report
SCCA National Sports Car Championship
1955	(United States) Phil Hill	(United States) George E. Tilp	Ferrari 750 Monza	150 miles (240 km)	Elkhart Lake's Road America Road Race	report
1956	(United States) John Kilborn (United States) Howard Hively	(United States) John Kilborn	Ferrari 375 MM	6 hours	Road America 6 Hours	report
1957	(United States) Phil Hill	(United States) Gene Greenspun	Ferrari 315 S	500 miles (800 km)	Road America 500	report
1958	(Switzerland) Gaston Andrey (United States) Lance Reventlow	(United States) North American Racing Team	Ferrari 335 S	500 miles (800 km)	Road America 500	report
1959	(United States) Ed Crawford (United States) Walt Hansgen	(United States) Briggs Cunningham	Lister - Jaguar	500 miles (800 km)	Road America 500	report
1960	(United States) Dave Causey (United States) Luke Stear	(United States) Dave Causey	Maserati Tipo 61	500 miles (800 km)	Road America 500	report
1961	(United States) Walt Hansgen (United States) Augie Pabst	(United States) Briggs Cunningham	Maserati Tipo 63	500 miles (800 km)	Road America 500	report
1962	(United States) Jim Hall (United States) Hap Sharp	(United States) Jim Hall	Chaparral 1-Chevrolet	500 miles (800 km)	Road America 500	report
United States Road Racing Championship
1963	(United States) Augie Pabst (United States) Bill Wuesthoff	(United States) Porsche Car Import/Oliver Schmidt	Elva Mk.7-Porsche	500 miles (800 km)	Road America 500	report
1964	(United States) Walt Hansgen (United States) Augie Pabst	(United States) John Mecom Jr.	Ferrari 250 LM	500 miles (800 km)	Road America 500	report
1965	(United States) Jim Hall (United States) Hap Sharp (United States) Ronnie Hissom	(United States) Jim Hall	Chaparral 2A-Chevrolet	500 miles (800 km)	Road America 500	report
1966	(United States) Chuck Parsons	(United States) Randy Hilton	McLaren Elva Mk.II-Chevrolet	500 miles (800 km)	Road America 500	report
1967	(United States) Chuck Parsons (United States) Skip Scott	(United States) Carl Haas	McLaren Elva Mk.III-Chevrolet	500 miles (800 km)	Road America 500	report
1968	(United States) Chuck Parsons (United States) Skip Scott	(United States) Carl Haas	Lola T70 Mk.3-Chevrolet	500 miles (800 km)	Road America 500	report
1969–1978: Not held
IMSA GT Championship
1979	(United Kingdom) David Hobbs (United Kingdom) Derek Bell	(United States) McLaren North America	BMW 320i Turbo	500 miles (800 km)	Pabst 500	report
1980	(United States) John Paul Jr. (United States) John Paul Sr.	(United States) JLP Racing	Porsche 935 JLP-2	500 miles (800 km)	Pabst 500	report
1981	(West Germany) Rolf Stommelen (West Germany) Harald Grohs	(West Germany) Andial Meister Racing	Porsche 935 K3	500 miles (800 km)	Pabst 500	report
1982	(United Kingdom) John Fitzpatrick (United Kingdom) David Hobbs	(United Kingdom) John Fitzpatrick Racing	Porsche 935 K4	500 miles (800 km)	Pabst 500	report
1983	(West Germany) Klaus Ludwig (United States) Tim Coconis	(West Germany) Zakspeed	Ford Mustang GTP	460 miles (740 km) ^{A}	Pabst 500	report
1984	(United States) Al Holbert (United Kingdom) Derek Bell	(United States) Holbert Racing	Porsche 962	500 miles (800 km)	Budweiser 500	report
1985	(United States) Drake Olson (United States) Bobby Rahal	(United States) Dyson Racing	Porsche 962	500 miles (800 km)	Löwenbräu Classic	report
1986	(United States) Al Holbert (United States) Al Unser Jr.	(United States) Holbert Racing	Porsche 962	500 miles (800 km)	Löwenbräu Classic	report
1987	(United States) Price Cobb (United Kingdom) Johnny Dumfries	(United States) Dyson Racing	Porsche 962	500 miles (800 km)	Löwenbräu Classic	report
1988	(Australia) Geoff Brabham (United States) John Morton	(United States) Electramotive Engineering	Nissan GTP ZX-T	500 km (310 mi)	Miller High Life 500	report
1989	(Australia) Geoff Brabham (United States) Chip Robinson	(United States) Electramotive Engineering	Nissan GTP ZX-T	500 km (310 mi)	Miller High Life 500	report
1990	(Australia) Geoff Brabham	(United States) Nissan Performance	Nissan NPT-90	250 km (160 mi)^{B}	Chicago Tribune presents the Nissan Grand Prix of Road America	report
1991	(United States) Davy Jones	(United Kingdom) Bud Light/Jaguar Racing	Jaguar XJR-16	300 km (190 mi)^{C}	Nissan Grand Prix of Road America	report
1992	(Argentina) Juan Manuel Fangio II	(United States) All American Racers	Eagle Mk III Toyota	2 hours	Nissan Grand Prix of Road America	report
1993	(Germany) John Winter (Germany) Manuel Reuter	(Germany) Joest Porsche Racing	Porsche 962C	500 km (310 mi)	Piggly Wiggly Grand Prix 500 Kilometers	report
1994–1999 Not held
Grand American Road Racing Championship
2000	(Belgium) Didier Theys (Switzerland) Fredy Lienhard (Italy) Mauro Baldi	(United States) Doran Lista Racing	Ferrari 333 SP-Judd	500 miles (800 km)	Sargento Road America 500	report
2001	(Belgium) Didier Theys (Switzerland) Fredy Lienhard (Italy) Mauro Baldi	(United States) Lista Doran Racing	Ferrari 333 SP-Judd	500 miles (800 km)	Sargento Road America 500	report
American Le Mans Series
2002	(Denmark) Tom Kristensen (Italy) Rinaldo Capello	(Germany) Audi Sport North America	Audi R8	4 hours, 15 minutes	Road America 500 presented by the Chicago Tribune	report
2003	(United Kingdom) Johnny Herbert (Finland) JJ Lehto	(United States) ADT Champion Racing	Audi R8	2 hours, 45 minutes	Road America 500 presented by the Chicago Tribune	report
2004	(Finland) JJ Lehto (Germany) Marco Werner	(United States) ADT Champion Racing	Audi R8	2 hours, 45 minutes	Road America 500 presented by the Chicago Tribune	report
2005	(Germany) Frank Biela (Italy) Emanuele Pirro	(United States) ADT Champion Racing	Audi R8	2 hours, 45 minutes	Generac 500	report
2006	(Germany) Frank Biela (Italy) Emanuele Pirro	(United States) Audi Sport North America	Audi R10 TDI	2 hours, 45 minutes	Generac 500	report
2007	(France) Romain Dumas (Germany) Timo Bernhard	(United States) Penske Racing	Porsche RS Spyder	4 hours	Generac 500	report
2008	(Germany) Lucas Luhr (Germany) Marco Werner	(United States) Audi Sport North America	Audi R10 TDI	4 hours	Generac 500	report
2009	(United States) Scott Sharp (Australia) David Brabham	(United States) Patrón Highcroft Racing	Acura ARX-02a	2 hours, 45 minutes	Time Warner Cable Road Race Showcase	report
2010	(United Kingdom) Paul Drayson (United Kingdom) Jonny Cocker	(United Kingdom) Drayson Racing	Lola B09/60	2 hours, 45 minutes	American Le Mans Series powered by eStar	report
2011	(Germany) Klaus Graf (Germany) Lucas Luhr	(United States) Muscle Milk Aston Martin Racing	Lola-Aston Martin B08/62	4 hours	Time Warner Cable Road Race Showcase	report
2012	(United States) Chris Dyson (United Kingdom) Guy Smith	(United States) Dyson Racing	Lola B12/60-Mazda	4 hours	Road America Road Race Showcase	report
2013	(Germany) Klaus Graf (Germany) Lucas Luhr	(United States) Muscle Milk Pickett Racing	HPD ARX-03c-Honda	2 hours, 45 minutes	Orion Energy Systems 245	report
IMSA SportsCar Championship
2014	(Portugal) João Barbosa (Brazil) Christian Fittipaldi	(United States) Action Express Racing	Coyote Corvette DP Chevrolet	2 hours, 45 minutes	Continental Tire Road Race Showcase	report
2015	(United States) Dane Cameron (United States) Eric Curran	(United States) Action Express Racing	Coyote Corvette DP Chevrolet	2 hours, 40 minutes	Continental Tire Road Race Showcase	report
2016	(United States) Dane Cameron (United States) Eric Curran	(United States) Action Express Racing	Coyote Corvette DP Chevrolet	2 hours, 40 minutes	Continental Tire Road Race Showcase	report
2017	(Brazil) Pipo Derani (United States) Johannes van Overbeek	(United States) Tequila Patrón ESM	Nissan Onroak DPi	2 hours, 40 minutes	Continental Tire Road Race Showcase	report
2018	(United States) Jon Bennett (United States) Colin Braun	(United States) CORE Autosport	Oreca 07	2 hours, 40 minutes	Continental Tire Road Race Showcase	report
2019	(United States) Jonathan Bomarito (United Kingdom) Harry Tincknell	(Germany) Joest Racing	Mazda RT24-P	2 hours, 40 minutes	Road Race Showcase at Road America	report
2020	(Brazil) Hélio Castroneves (United States) Ricky Taylor	(United States) Team Penske	Acura ARX-05	2 hours, 40 minutes	IMSA SportsCar Weekend	report
2021	(Brazil) Pipo Derani (Brazil) Felipe Nasr	(United States) Action Express Racing	Cadillac DPi-V.R	2 hours, 40 minutes	IMSA SportsCar Weekend	report
2022	(Portugal) Filipe Albuquerque (United States) Ricky Taylor	(United States) WTR - Konica Minolta Acura	Acura ARX-05	2 hours, 40 minutes	IMSA Fastlane SportsCar Weekend	report
2023	(Australia) Matt Campbell (Brazil) Felipe Nasr	(Germany) Porsche Penske Motorsport	Porsche 963	2 hours, 40 minutes	IMSA SportsCar Weekend	report
2024	(United Kingdom) Nick Tandy (France) Mathieu Jaminet	(Germany) Porsche Penske Motorsport	Porsche 963	2 hours, 40 minutes	IMSA SportsCar Weekend	report
2025	(Austria) Philipp Eng (Belgium) Dries Vanthoor	(United States) BMW M Team RLL	BMW M Hybrid V8	2 hours, 40 minutes	Motul SportsCar Grand Prix	report
2026	(Portugal) Filipe Albuquerque (United States) Ricky Taylor	(United States) Cadillac Wayne Taylor Racing	Cadillac V-Series.R	6 hours	Motul SportsCar Endurance Grand Prix	report

- ^A Race scheduled for 500 miles (800 km) but ended at 460 miles (737km) due to heavy rain and track flooding.
- ^B Scheduled for two 250-kilometer heats, the first heat was cancelled due to heavy rain.
- ^C A 300-kilometer GTP/Lights race and 200-kilometer GTO/GTU/AAC race were held, totaling 500 kilometers.
