= 1961 National Races Lime Rock =

The July 1, 1961, race at Lime Rock Park was the seventh racing event of the eleventh season of the Sports Car Club of America's 1961 Championship Racing Series.

SCCA National Lime Rock [AP+BP] Results

Div.	Finish	Driver	Car Model	Car #	Comments
AP	1st	Charlie Hayes	Ferrari 250 GT	61	1st in AP
AP	2d	George Constantine	Corvette	49	
BP	3rd	Don Yenko	Corvette	22	1st in BP
BP	4th	Bruce Jennings	Porsche 356 Carrera	77	
BP	5th	Joe Buzzetta	Porsche 356 Carrera	78	
BP	6th	Frank Wagenhofer	Porsche 356	11	
BP	7th	Dick Lang	Corvette	85	
BP	8th	Grady Davis	Corvette	10	
BP	9th	Fred Hoffman	Corvette	21	
BP	10th	Alan Markelson	Corvette	88	
BP	11th	Edmund Hamburger	Corvette	33	
