= June Sprints =

WeatherTech Chicago Region SCCA June Sprints

WeatherTech Chicago Region SCCA June Sprints
- Venue: Road America
- Location: Town of Plymouth, Sheboygan County, at N7390 Highway 67, Elkhart Lake, Wisconsin; 43°47′51″N 87°59′38″W
- First race: 1956; 70 years ago

Circuit information
- Surface: Asphalt
- Length: 6.515 km (4.048 mi)
- Turns: 14

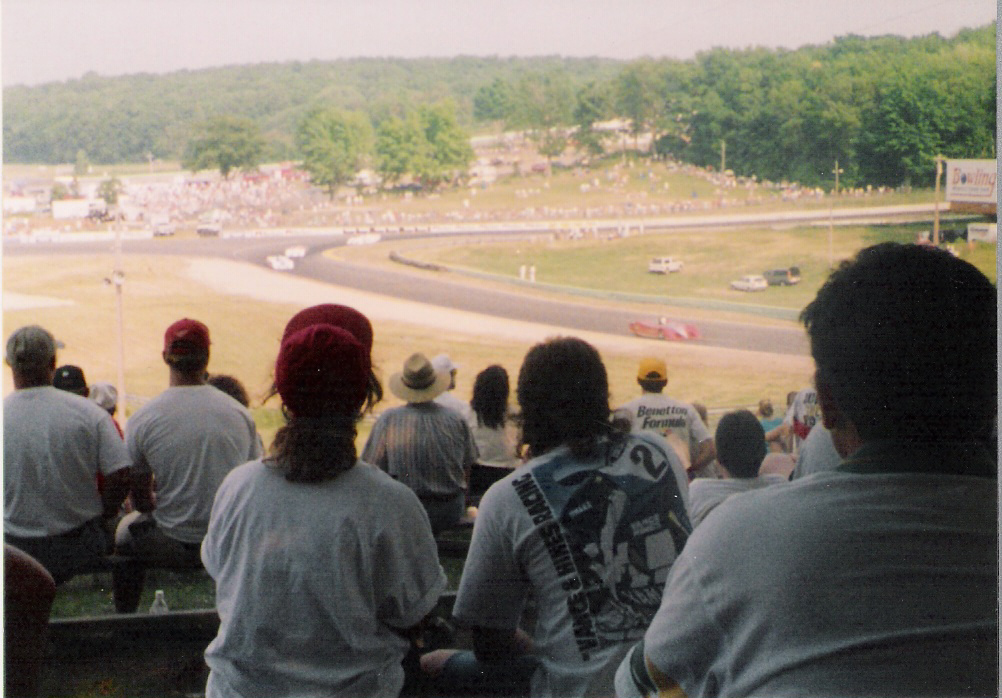
Fans looking east at Turn Five during the 1995 June Sprints

The June Sprints are amateur sports car races held yearly on the third or fourth weekend of June at Road America in Elkhart Lake, Wisconsin.

It is one of the longest-running standalone road races in the United States.

== History ==
The event was first held in 1956 as a round of the SCCA National Sports Car Championship, as a shorter-format alternative to the Road America 500.

In 1982, the race was won by professional golfer Danny Edwards.

The June Sprints are hosted by the Chicago Region of the Sports Car Club of America. Unlike the SCCA National Championship Runoffs (held at Road America between 2009 and 2013, as well as in 2020 and 2024), the June Sprints are open to any nationally licensed driver in good standing with the SCCA.
