= Kohler International Challenge =

Vintage road race in the United States

Coordinates: 43°47′51″N 87°59′38″W

The Kohler International Challenge with Brian Redman or the KIC (formerly the Brian Redman International Challenge, BRIC) is one of the largest vintage road races in the United States. It is held at Road America during the third weekend in July and has been sanctioned by the SVRA since 2006. Before 2006, the VSCDA held the event and it was called the BRIC (Brian Redman International Challenge).

The origin of the event itself began with Chicago area restaurateur Joseph Marchetti hosting the vintage and historic race car competition under the name Chicago Historic Races (CHR) in 1981. CHR grew in attendance over the course of its running culminating with the 1996 event which received national television coverage and tens of thousands of spectators.

In November 1996 Road America severed the contract with CHR and began producing the event "in house" under VSCDA sanctioning.
