= Lister Costin =

Lightweight sports racing car

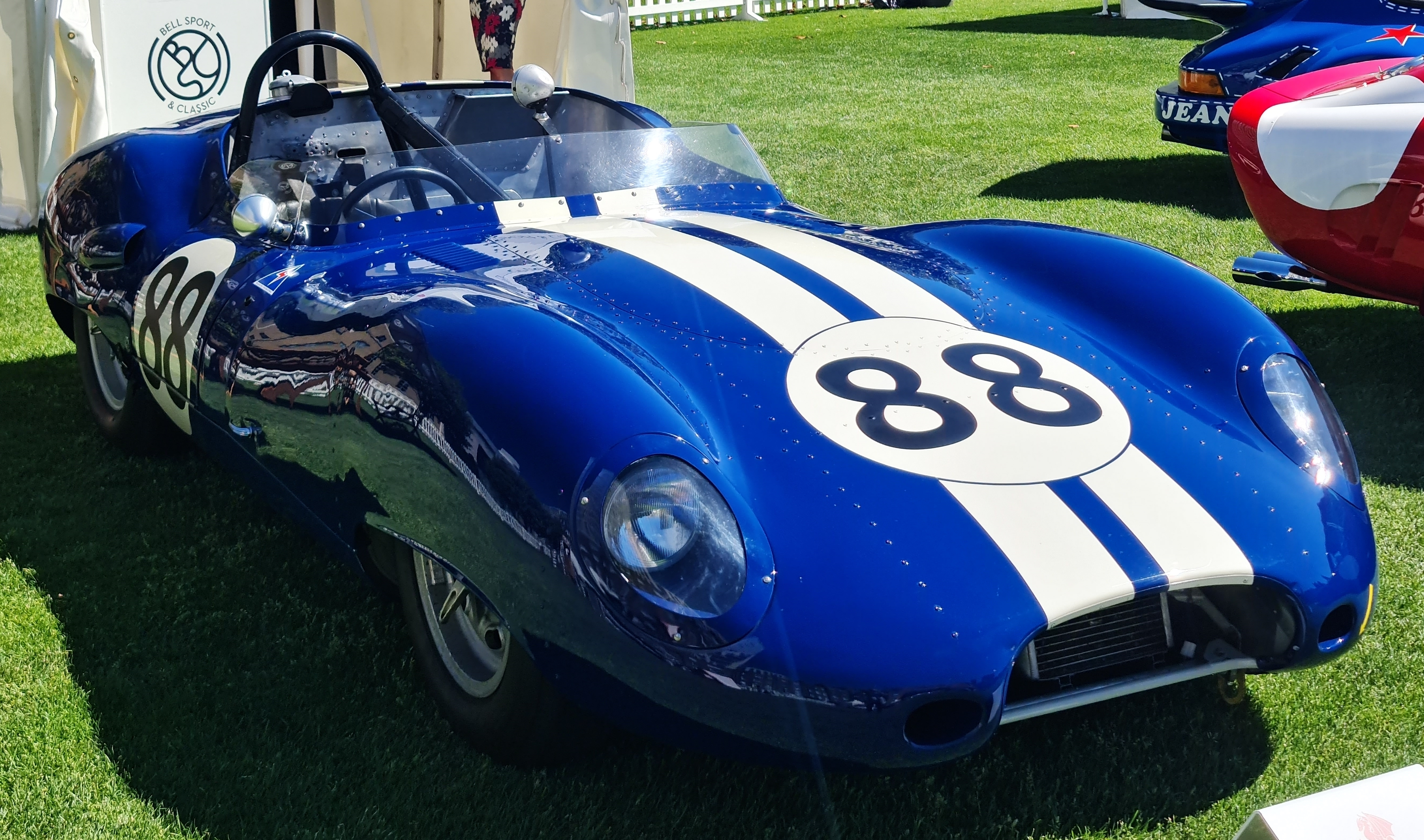
- Category: Sports car
- Constructor: Lister
- Predecessor: Lister Knobbly

Technical specifications
- Chassis: Steel-reinforced tubular space frame covered in aluminum panels
- Suspension (front): Double wishbones, coil springs over telescopic shock absorbers
- Suspension (rear): DeDion axle, twin trailing arms, coil springs over telescopic shock absorbers
- Length: 4,388 mm (172.8 in)
- Width: 1,702 mm (67.0 in)
- Height: 789 mm (31.1 in)
- Axle track: 1,321 mm (52.0 in) (front); 1,359–1,372 mm (53.5–54.0 in) (rear)
- Wheelbase: 2,305–2,337 mm (90.7–92.0 in)
- Engine: Front-engine, longitudinally mounted, 3.0–5.4 L (183–330 cu in), Jaguar XK/Chevrolet, I-6/V-8, NA
- Transmission: 4-speed manual
- Power: 260–360 hp (190–270 kW)
- Weight: 1,687–1,962 lb (765–890 kg)

Competition history

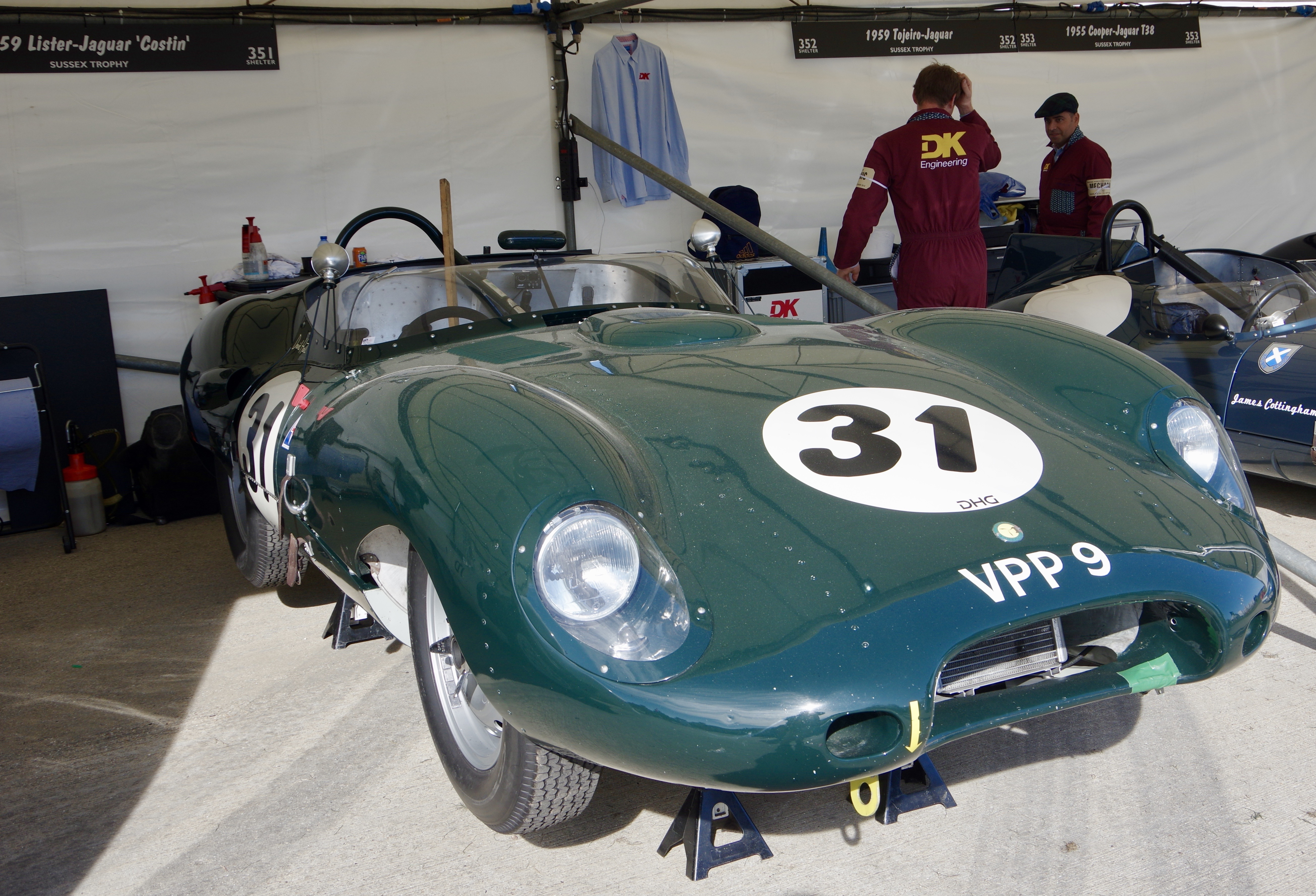
Lister-Jaguar Costin

The Lister Costin is a lightweight sports racing car, designed by British engineer and designer Frank Costin, and developed and built by British manufacturer Lister, between 1958 and 1959. A total of 17 models were produced. They were powered by either a Jaguar straight-6 engine, or a Chevrolet V8 engine.
