= Lola Mk1 =

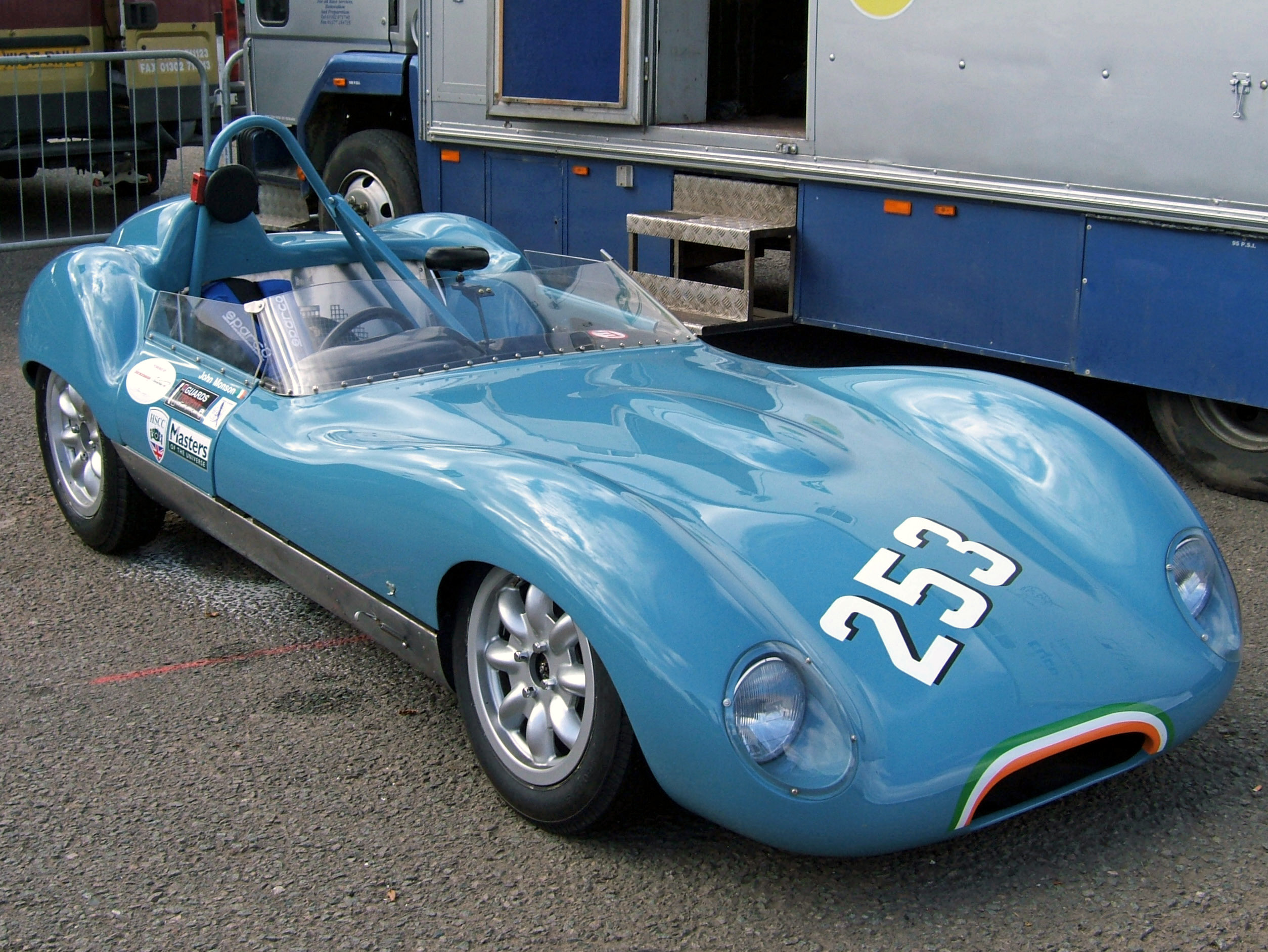
- Category: Sports racing car
- Constructor: Lola Cars
- Designers: Eric Broadley (chassis); Maurice Gomm (coachwork)
- Successor: Lola T120

Technical specifications
- Chassis: Steel or Fibreglass tubular spaceframe
- Suspension (front): Double wishbones
- Suspension (rear): Double wishbones
- Length: 132 in (3,352.8 mm)
- Axle track: 48 in (1,219.2 mm) (Front); 47.5 in (1,206.5 mm) (Rear)
- Wheelbase: 75–85 in (1,905.0–2,159.0 mm)
- Engine: Coventry Climax FWA I-4 engine NA front-mounted
- Transmission: Colotti Tipo 37 4 speed manual
- Weight: 812–840 lb (368.3–381.0 kg)

Competition history
- Notable entrants: Lola Racing Cars

The Lola Mk1 is the first sports racing car made by Lola, under the leadership and guidance of Eric Broadley, in 1958. The body was designed and developed by chief stylist Maurice Gomm, made out of a steel or fibreglass tubular spaceframe chassis, covered in a low-profile, sleek, aluminium skin. The 80 hp (60 kW), 1,098 cc (67.0 cu in), Coventry Climax FWA four-cylinder engine was designed by Harry Mundy and Walter Hassan. The car used a 4-speed manual transmission, and was lightweight, weighing in at 812–840 lb (368–381 kg). It won its class at the 1960 12 Hours of Sebring, being driven by Charles Vögele and Peter Ashdown. At least 32 cars were known to have been built, but the actual number is believed to be between 38 and 42.

== Gallery ==
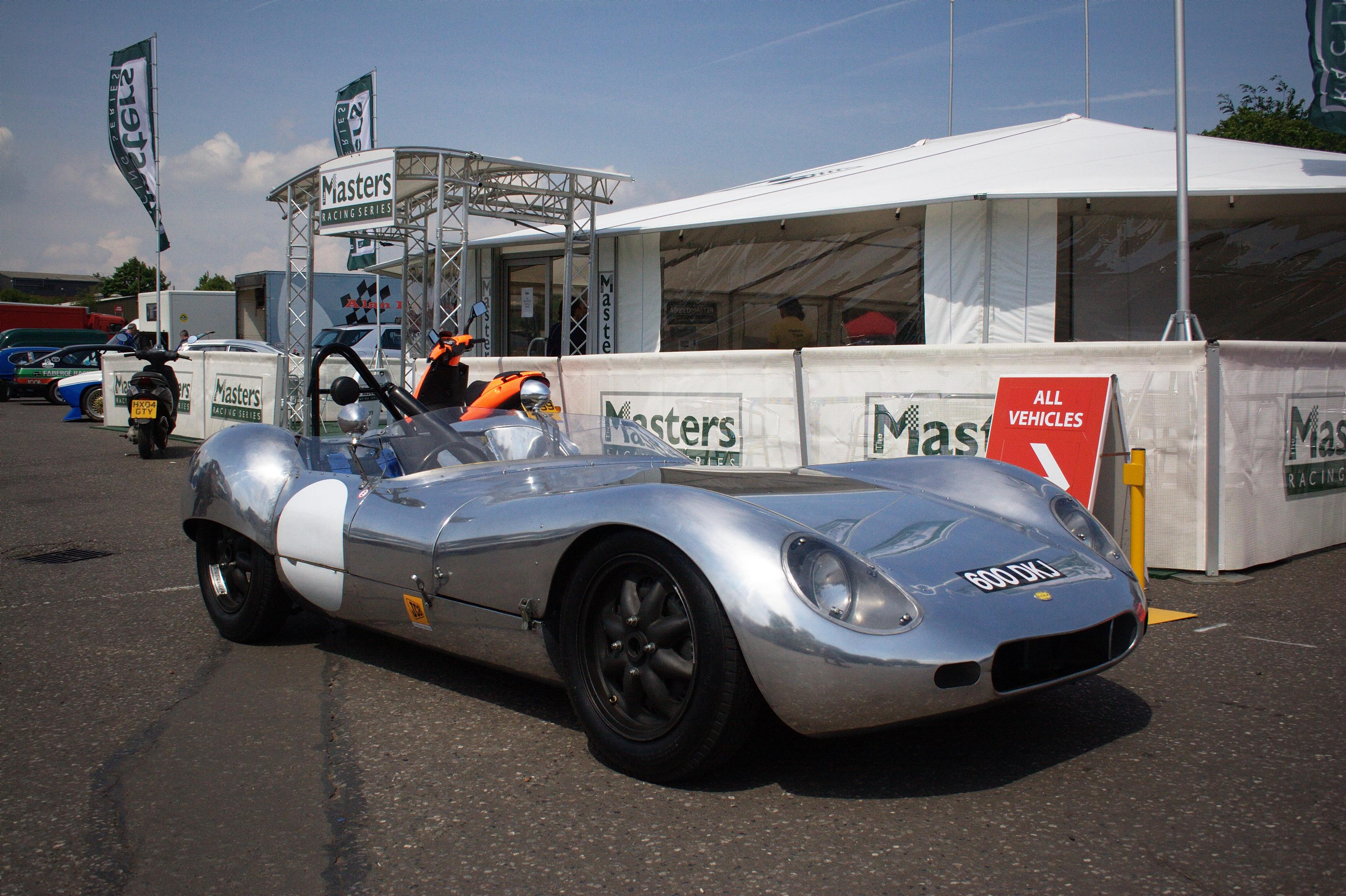

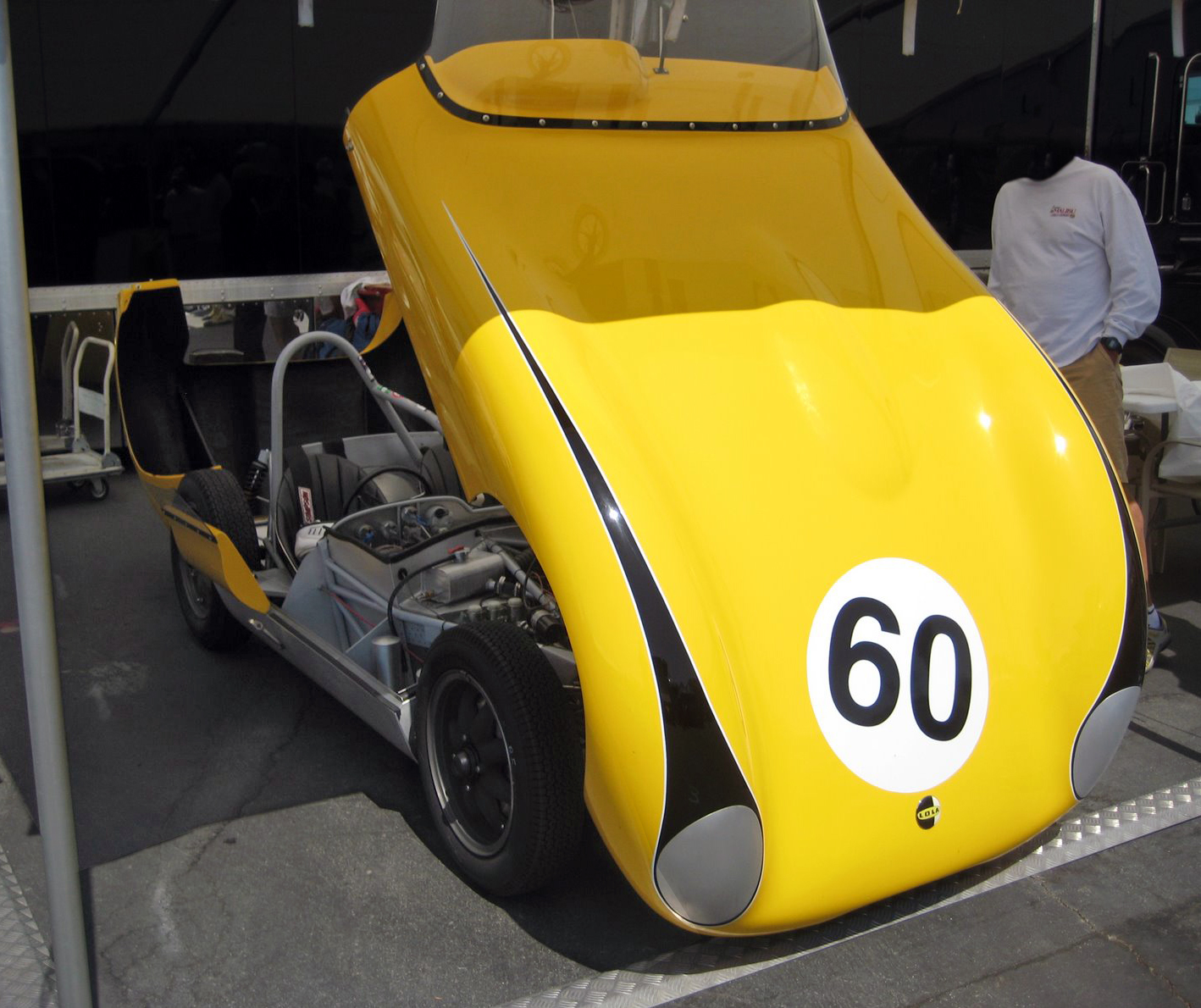

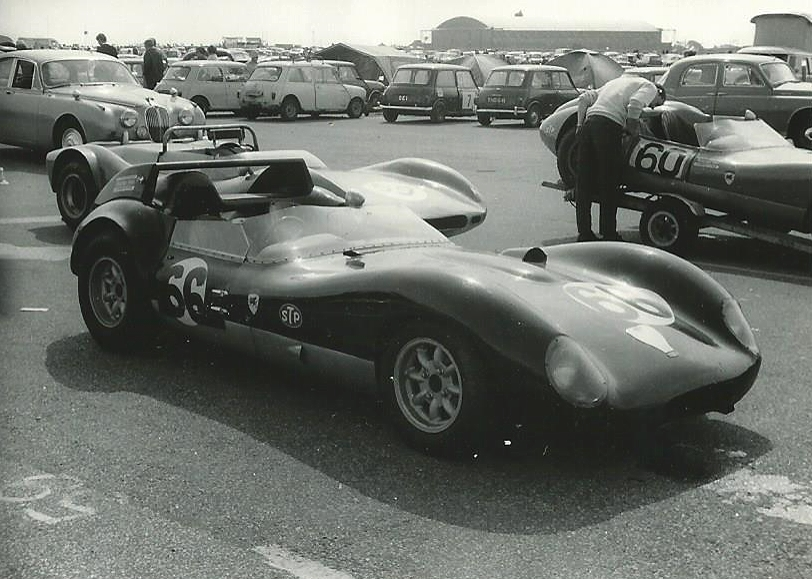

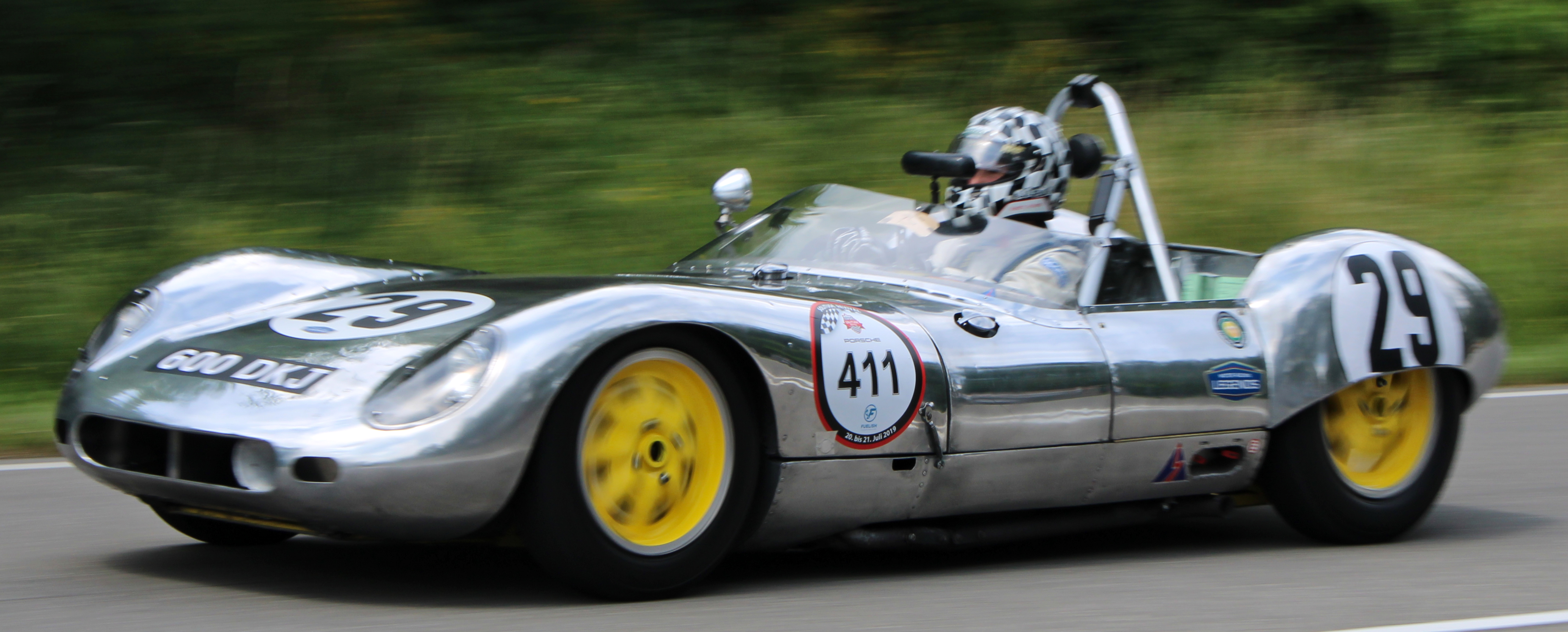

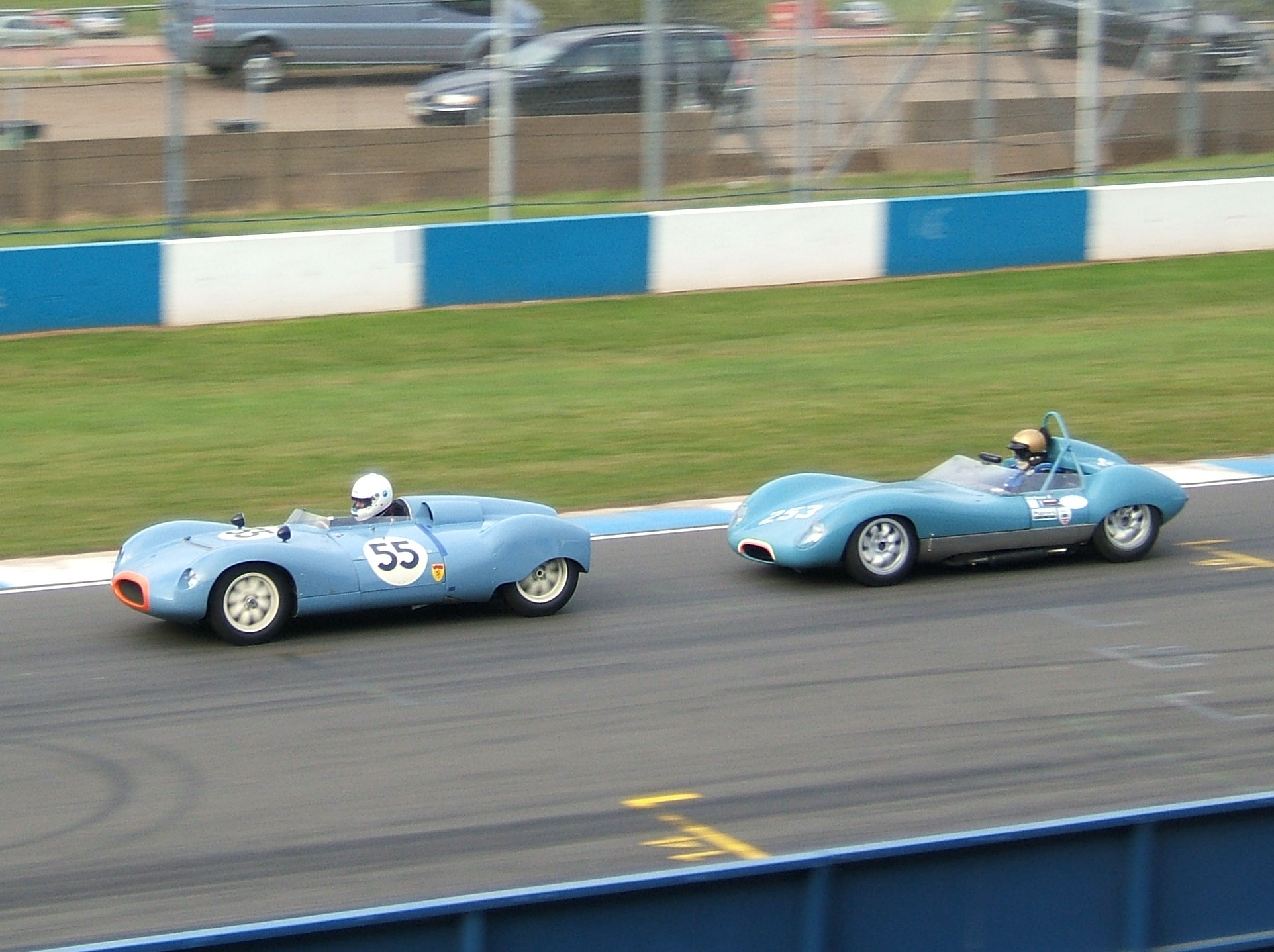

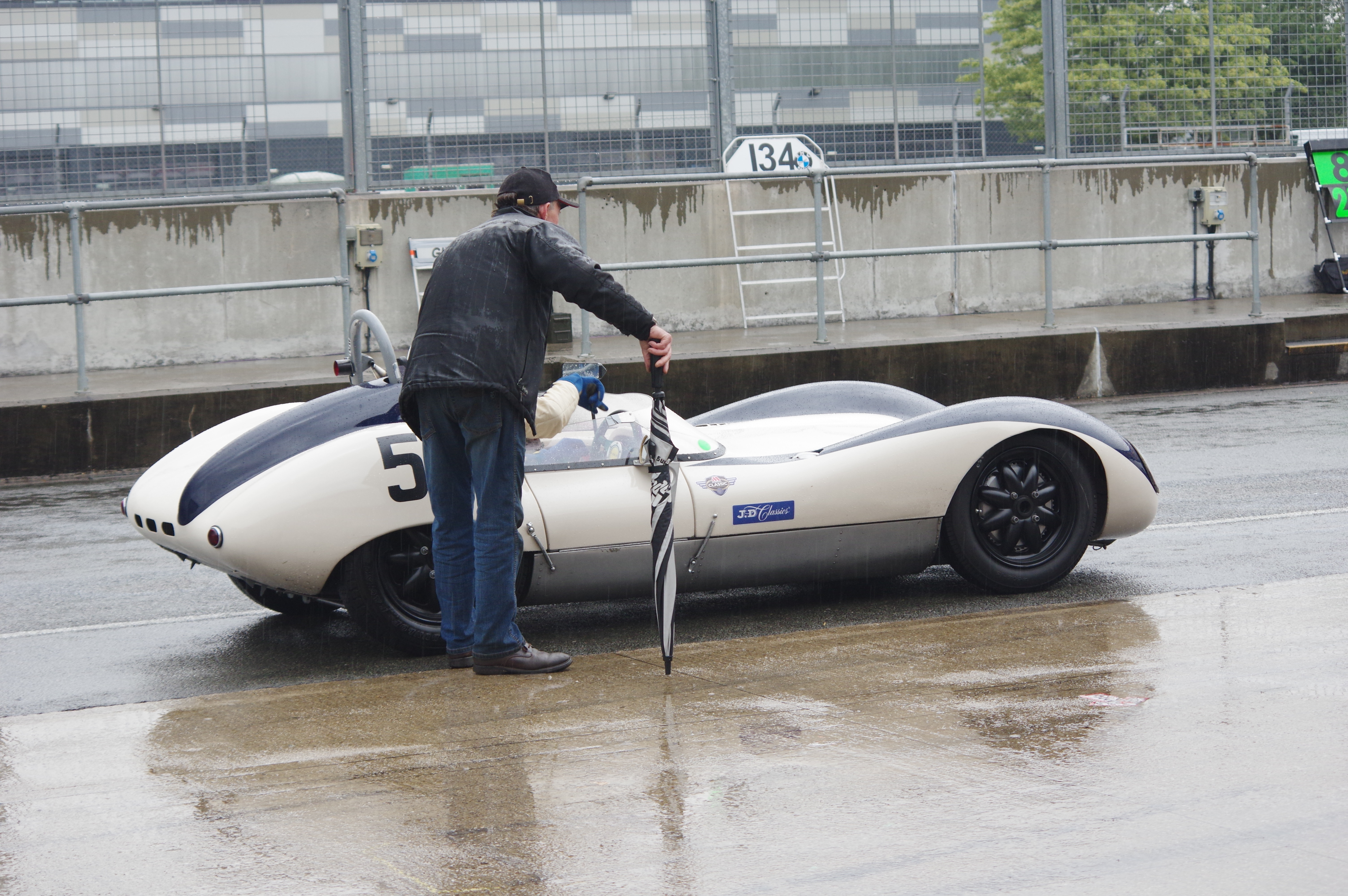
