= Road America =

Race track in Wisconsin, United States

America's National Park of Speed

- Road America Grand Prix Course (1955–present)
- Location: Town of Plymouth, Sheboygan County, at N7390 Highway 67, Elkhart Lake, Wisconsin, United States
- Coordinates: 43°47′51″N 87°59′38″W
- Capacity: Open seating without capacity limitation
- FIA Grade: 2
- Owner: Road America, Inc.
- Operator: Road America, Inc.
- Opened: 10 September 1955; 71 years ago
- Former names: Elkhart Lake's Road America (1955–1958)
- Major events: Current: IndyCar Series; XPEL Grand Prix of Road America (2016–present); IMSA SportsCar Championship; SportsCar Endurance Grand Prix (2014–present); GT World Challenge America (1991–1996, 1998, 2002–2004, 2006, 2008–2009, 2014–present); FR Americas (2021–present); MotoAmerica (1980–present); Trans-Am Series (1970–2005, 2009–present); SCCA Runoffs (2009–2013, 2020, 2024–present); Former: NASCAR Cup Series; Kwik Trip 250 (1956, 2021–2022); NASCAR Xfinity Series; Road America 180 (2010–2023); American Le Mans Series; Road America 500 (2002–2013); CART; Road America 200 (1982–2004, 2006–2007); Grand-Am; Rolex Sports Car Series (2000–2001, 2011–2013)
- Website: www.roadamerica.com

Grand Prix Course (1955–present)
- Surface: Asphalt
- Length: 4.048 mi (6.515 km)
- Turns: 14
- Race lap record: 1:41.874 ( (Italy) Alex Zanardi, Reynard 98I, 1998, CART)

Motorcycle Course (2003–present)
- Surface: Asphalt
- Length: 4.000 mi (6.437 km)
- Turns: 15
- Race lap record: 2:09.025 ( (United States) Josh Herrin, Ducati Panigale V4 R, 2023, SBK)

Karting road course
- Surface: Asphalt
- Length: 0.81 mi (1.3 km)

Off road racing road course (defunct)
- Surface: Clay
- Length: 1.1 mi (1.8 km)
- Elkhart Lake Road Race Circuits
- U.S. National Register of Historic Places
- Location within Wisconsin Location within the United States
- Location: Cty Hwys, J, P, JP, A, and Lake St., Elkhart Lake, Wisconsin
- Area: 56.7 acres (22.9 ha)
- Built: 1950
- NRHP reference No.: 06000053
- Added to NRHP: February 17, 2006

Road America is a motorsport road course near Elkhart Lake, Wisconsin, United States on Wisconsin Highway 67. It has hosted races since the 1950s and currently hosts races in the IndyCar Series, IMSA SportsCar Championship, Sports Car Club of America GT World Challenge America, Trans-Am Series and MotoAmerica.

== Current track and facilities ==
Road America is a permanent road course. It is halfway between Milwaukee and Green Bay and classified as an FIA Grade Two circuit.

The track is situated on 640 acres (260 ha) near the Kettle Moraine Scenic Drive. It has hosted races since 1955 and hosts over 400 events a year. Of its annual events, 9 major weekends are open to the public, including 3 motorcycle events including the MotoAmerica (AMA FIM) series, 3 vintage car events, Sports Car Club of America (SCCA) events, the IMSA SportsCar Championship, the GT World Challenge America, and the NASCAR Xfinity Series.

Road America is one of only a handful of road circuits in the world maintaining its original configuration being 4.048 mi (6.515 km) in length with 14 turns. The track features many elevation changes, along with a long front stretch where speeds approaching 200 mph (320 km/h) may be reached. One of the best known features of this course is a turn on the backside known as "the kink".

Road America's open seating allows spectators to venture throughout the grounds. Grandstands are available in several locations, as well as permanent hillside seating where crowds of more than 150,000 can be accommodated. Road America held one NASCAR Grand National race (now NASCAR Cup Series) in 1956 and two more Cup Series races in 2021 and 2022; NASCAR then opted to move the Cup Series and become a race in and around Chicago streets starting in 2023.

=== Briggs & Stratton Motorplex ===
In addition to the main course, the facility includes a 0.8-mile (1.3 km) karting track called the Briggs & Stratton Motorplex inside the Carousel. The motorplex hosts two series of karting events. It hosts weekly events on Tuesdays in the summer. It also hosts approximately six Saturday events during the summer. The motorplex also hosts events sanctioned by the North Woods GP series running Supermoto and street bike racing using small displacement motorcycles.

=== Off road racing circuit ===
The Motorplex was built at the site of an earlier off road racing circuit used for several SODA events in the 1990s. The 1995 event was televised tape delayed on ESPN2 by reporters Marty Reid, Ivan Stewart, and Jimmie Johnson. The course was 1.1 mi (1.8 km) long with 150 ft (46 m) of elevation change. The track featured a blind jump nicknamed "The Hell Hole".

=== Tunnel ===
In late 2006, Road America began a project to remove the old Bill Mitchell bridge and use a tunnel as the main entrance to the paddock. The tunnel project was completed in May 2007 with the grand opening celebration on May 31 for the AMA Suzuki Superbike Championship weekend. The tunnel is 16.5 ft (5.0 m) high and 36 ft (11 m) wide and has two lanes of traffic and two pedestrian walkways on either side. With the removal of the bridge, a new spectator viewing area was created.

== History of racing at Elkhart Lake ==
=== Open road course ===
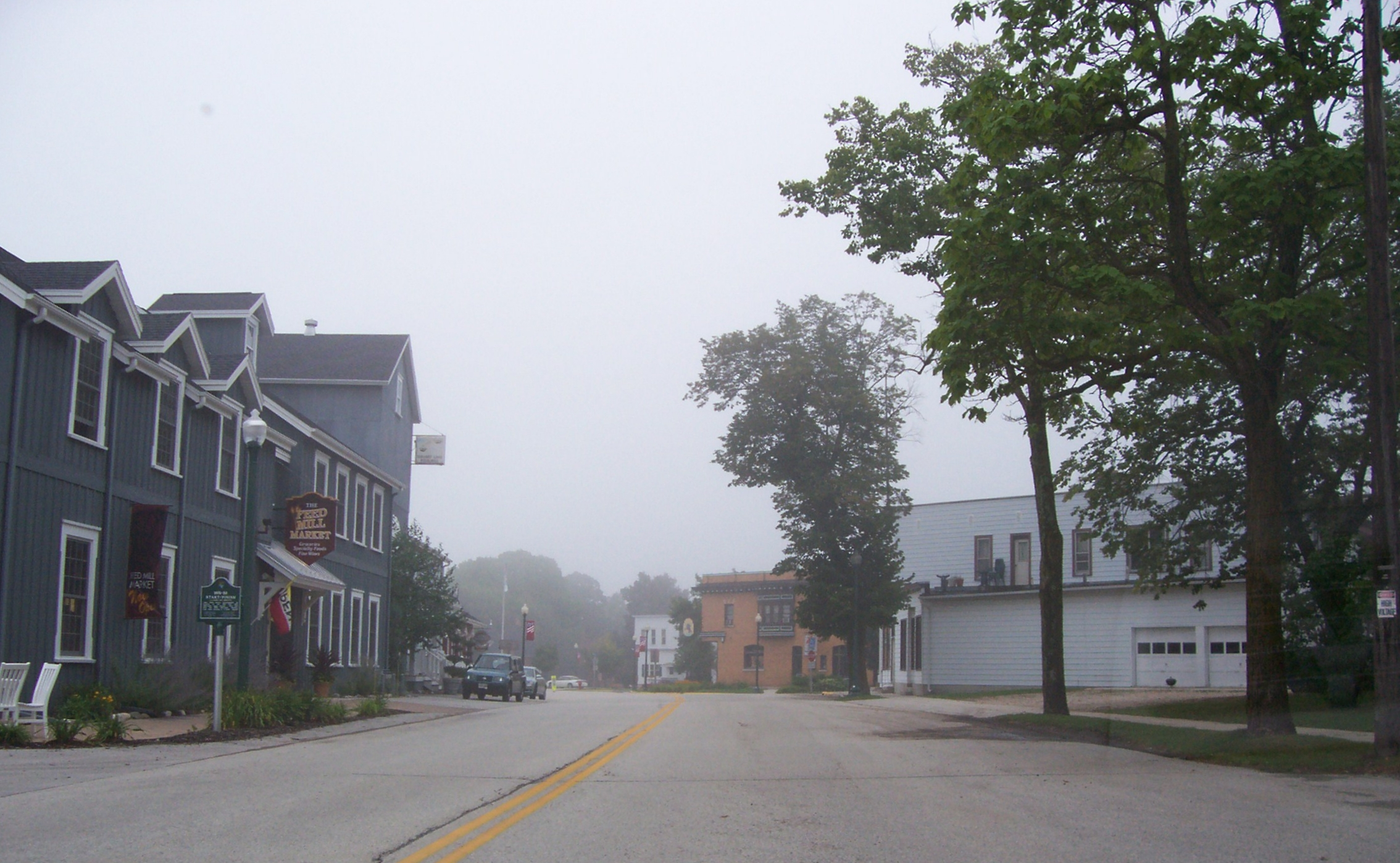
The site of the 1951 and 1952 start finish line for road races in downtown Elkhart Lake

In the late 1940s, road racing was gaining popularity, owing to the post World War II economy, and the influx of sporting automobiles. The Sports Car Club of America was the main organizer of these races, and in 1950, the Chicago Region SCCA and the Village of Elkhart Lake organized the first road race at Elkhart Lake.

The 1950 circuit start-finish line was on County Road P. Competitors went north to County Road J, then South into the Village of Elkhart Lake, and West on what is now County JP (then called County Highway X), and reconnected with County Road P for a total distance of 3.3 mi (5.3 km).

For the next two races, in 1951 and 1952, a different course was used. It was 6.5 mi (10.5 km) long, on County Roads J, A, and P. To date, one may still drive most of the original course.

The original course was registered on the National Register of Historic Places on February 17, 2006. Signs have been installed marking key locations on the course.

=== Private road course ===
After the tragedy at Watkins Glen in 1952, where a child was killed, the U.S. discontinued motorized contests of speed on public highways. This was a major blow for competition auto racing, ending a long-standing tradition. It did not permanently stop road racing but shifted it to private courses. In 1955, Clif Tufte started what is now known as Road America, in a configuration that has changed little since. The addition of Road America as a private track meant a transition from racing through the streets of tiny Elkhart Lake to racing on a big, wide, dedicated race track.

=== Racing at Road America ===
Many different racing series have raced at Road America. The first was the Sports Car Club of America (SCCA) on September 10, 1955. The Road America 500 is a sports car race that was part of different championships, among them the SCCA National Sports Car Championship, the United States Road Racing Championship and the IMSA GT Championship. Currently it is a points-paying race of the IMSA SportsCar Championship. The Grand Prix of Road America is an open-wheel race held as part of the Champ Car World Series. It is now part of the IndyCar Series.

Other notable series include NASCAR's Grand National (now NASCAR Cup Series) in 1956 and NASCAR Xfinity Series since 2010, CART from 1982 to 2007, Grand-Am Rolex Sports Car Racing Series, CanAm, Trans-Am, AMA, and the SCCA National Championship Runoffs from 2009 to 2013. The Stadium Super Trucks began racing at the track in 2018; the trucks run a shortened course that bypasses turns 6 to 12, though the full layout is used on the final lap.

Road America also holds a variety of vintage racing events, including the Kohler International Challenge.

=== ALMS race history ===
At the 2008 Road America 500 an Audi R10 TDI set an LMP1 pole time of 1:46.935. At the 2009 Road Race Showcase, Dyson Racing Team set an LMP2 pole time of 1:51.010. At the 2011 Road Race Showcase, BMW Team RLL set a GT pole time of 2:05.447, while at the same event a Porsche 997 GT3 set a GTC pole time of 2:14.126.

=== Indy Car / Champ Car race results ===
The CART Champ Car series held races at the track from 1982 to 2007, with the exception of 2005. The Verizon Indy Car Series revived the event beginning in 2016.

== Major incidents and events at the track ==
=== 2005 BRIC wreck ===
At the beginning of the Group 6 race in the 2005 Brian Redman International Challenge, there was a large incident consisting of most of the field: The driver starting fifth (Ray Mulacek, 1969 Chevrolet Camaro) accelerated well before the green flag and tried to force his way between the wall and the car in front of him, resulting in contact with the wall. A following car checked up and was rear-ended, causing a spin that led to further contact as following cars were unable to avoid the growing incident. After just a few seconds of green flag racing, the red flag was waved. Following the initial incident, the failure of trailing drivers to heed red flags being shown at 14 and 15 (under the bridge at the crest of the hill) may have compounded the issue. Nobody was seriously injured, with the worst injury being a broken arm.

=== Cristiano da Matta deer incident ===
On August 3, 2006, Cristiano da Matta, driver of Champ Car's RuSPORT team and 2002 series champion, was involved in a collision with a deer during Champ Car open testing at Road America. The deer ran in front of his car as he was heading towards turn 6. He hit the deer with his right front tire, the deer then flew back and hit da Matta in the cockpit. Da Matta was unconscious when the safety crew extricated him from the car, and was airlifted via ThedaSTAR to Theda Clark Medical Center south of Appleton, where he underwent surgery to remove a subdural hematoma.

=== Death of Adam Schatz ===
Adam Schatz, 26, from Chicago, Illinois, died in a karting accident during the Road America Super Nationals, Championship Enduro Series on July 12, 2008.

Bump drafting was a determining factor of the crash.

During the end of the race, Schatz was in second place. On the main straight, shortly after the last turn, Schatz saw the kart in third position on his left and tried to pull ahead to be bumped. As he did so, the kart in fourth position bumped the third, speeding the third kart up. At this point Schatz was not clear as to what was happening, and as he moved to his left, the two karts made contact.

Schatz's kart veered hard left and hit the wall. The impact sent the kart flying ten feet into the air ejecting the driver onto the track. The rest of the drivers avoided Schatz, some drivers stopped and after seeing Schatz's condition, waved to get medical help.

The race was immediately stopped as medical assistance arrived on the place of the accident. Schatz had suffered brain stem and spinal cord injuries and his heart had stopped. He was revived by the doctors and taken to the Theda Clark Memorial Hospital in Neenah, Wisconsin, but his injuries proved to be too severe to survive and one week later he died.

=== 2015 CCR Tifosi Challenge red flag wreck ===
During the Pirelli World Challenge weekend, drivers Steve Hill and Jim Booth were involved in an intense battle for first. The drivers contacted each other heading towards turn 5, causing Jim Booth to go airborne into the catch fence at 150 mph. This caused significant damage to the fence throwing debris into the spectator area. Booth's car was completely destroyed while Hill was able to continue the race with minor damage. Neither of the drivers, personnel, or spectators were injured during the incident.

== Lap records ==
The official lap record for Road America is 1:39.866, set by Dario Franchitti during the qualifying of the 2000 Motorola 220 while the race lap record is 1:41.874, set by Alex Zanardi in the 1998 Texaco/Havoline 200. As of September 2026, the fastest official race lap records at Road America for different classes are listed as:

Category	Time	Driver	Vehicle	Event
Grand Prix Course (1955–present): 4.048 mi (6.515 km)
CART	1:41.874	Alex Zanardi	Reynard 98I	1998 Texaco/Havoline 200
IndyCar	1:42.8921	Will Power	Dallara IR-18	2023 Sonsio Grand Prix at Road America
CCWS	1:44.133	Sébastien Bourdais	Lola B02/00	2006 Grand Prix of Road America
LMP1	1:48.723	Marco Werner	Audi R10 TDI	2008 Road America 500
IMSA GTP	1:48.944	Juan Manuel Fangio II	Eagle MkIII	1992 Road America 2 Hours
LMP2	1:49.439	Franck Montagny	Acura ARX-01B	2008 Road America 500
LMDh	1:49.676	Filipe Albuquerque	Acura ARX-06	2023 IMSA SportsCar Weekend
DPi	1:51.034	Dane Cameron	Acura ARX-05	2020 IMSA SportsCar Weekend
Indy NXT	1:51.4038	Nolan Siegel	Dallara IL-15	2023 Road America Indy NXT round
LMH	1:52.387	Roman De Angelis	Aston Martin Valkyrie AMR-LMH	2025 SportsCar Grand Prix
LMP900	1:53.403	Frank Biela	Audi R8	2002 Road America 500
Group C	1:55.330	Manuel Reuter	Porsche 962C	1993 Road America 500 km
DP	1:55.458	Tristan Nunez	Mazda Prototype	2016 Continental Tire Road Race Showcase
LMP675	1:56.944	Jon Field	MG-Lola EX257	2002 Road America 500
WSC	1:58.379	Didier Theys	Ferrari 333 SP	2001 Road America 500
LMP3	1:58.566	Nico Pino	Ligier JS P320	2023 IMSA SportsCar Weekend
Formula Atlantic	1:58.652	Tõnis Kasemets	Swift 016.a	2023 Road America Atlantic Championship round
LMPC	1:59.245	Patricio O'Ward	Oreca FLM09	2017 Continental Tire Road Race Showcase
Can-Am	2:00.268	Geoff Brabham	Lola T530	1981 Can-Am/CRC Trans-Am Road America
Prototype Lites	2:00.418	Matt Romer	Élan DP02	2024 Road America SCCA National Championship Runoffs Prototype 1 round
Pro Mazda	2:01.3306	Toby Sowery	Tatuus PM-18	2018 Road America Pro Mazda round
GT1 (GTS)	2:01.446	Olivier Beretta	Chevrolet Corvette C6.R	2005 Road America 500
F5000	2:02.220	Danny Ongais	Lola T332	1976 Road America F5000 round
LM GTE	2:02.281	Nick Tandy	Chevrolet Corvette C8.R	2021 Road Race Showcase at Road America
TA1	2:02.659	Matthew Brabham	Gymsoda Ford Mustang	2026 Road America Trans-Am round
Formula Regional	2:03.140	Jett Bowling	Ligier JS F3	2025 Road America FR Americas round
GT3	2:04.089	Frederik Schandorff	McLaren 720S GT3 Evo	2023 IMSA SportsCar Weekend
Group 7	2:04.374	Mark Donohue	Porsche 917/30 TC	1973 Road America Can-Am
Lamborghini Super Trofeo	2:05.270	Danny Formal	Lamborghini Huracán Super Trofeo Evo2	2025 Road America Lamborghini Super Trofeo North America round
GT	2:05.882	Antonio García	Chevrolet Corvette C6.R	2012 Road Race Showcase
IMSA GTP Lights	2:06.115	Charles Morgan	Kudzu DG-2	1992 Road America 2 Hours
Ferrari Challenge	2:06.562	Johnny Kaminskey	Ferrari 296 Challenge	2026 Road America Ferrari Challenge North America round
IMSA GTS	2:06.593	Scott Pruett	Oldsmobile Cutlass	1993 Road America 500 km
USF2000	2:07.9190	Brad Majman	Tatuus USF-22	2026 The Andersen Companies Grand Prix of Road America
Porsche Carrera Cup	2:08.194	Callum Hedge	Porsche 911 (992 II) Cup	2026 Road America Porsche Carrera Cup North America round
IMSA GTO	2:09.182	Pete Halsmer	Mazda RX-7	1991 IMSA GTO Road America 200 km
McLaren Trophy	2:09.470	Michael O'Brien	McLaren Artura Trophy Evo	2026 Road America McLaren Trophy America round
SRO GT2	2.10.056	Lawrence Tomlinson	Ginetta G56 GT2	2026 Road America GT America round
Group 5	2:10.250	John Paul Jr.	Porsche 935 JLP-3	1981 Road America 500 Miles
Sports 2000	2:10.648	Gary Gove	Ralt RT2	1980 Road America Can-Am round
TA2	2:11.113	Brent Crews	Ford Mustang Trans-Am	2023 Road America Trans-Am round
GTO	2:11.399	Paul Gentilozzi	Jaguar XKR	2000 Road America 500 Miles
Barber Pro	2:12.240	Jamie Menninga	Reynard 98E	2000 Road America Barber Pro round
NASCAR Xfinity	2:12.408	Justin Allgaier	Chevrolet Camaro SS	2023 Road America 180
AGT	2:12.453	Irv Hoerr	Chevrolet Camaro	2000 Road America 500 Miles
Formula 4	2:12.738	Alex Popow Jr.	Ligier JS F422	2025 Road America F4 United States round
NASCAR Cup	2:14.089	William Byron	Chevrolet Camaro ZL1 1LE NASCAR	2021 Jockey Made in America 250
USF Juniors	2:14.5710	Max Taylor	Tatuus JR-23	2024 PFC Grand Prix of Road America
GT4	2:14.987	Robin Liddell	Chevrolet Camaro GT4.R	2023 Road America 120
GTU	2:16.719	Darren Law	Porsche 911 (996) GT3 R	2000 Road America 500 Miles
Formula BMW	2:17.762	Adrien Tambay	Mygale FB02	2008 Road America Formula BMW Americas round
Group 6	2:17.799	Mike Hall	Lola T294	1977 Citicop Can-Am Challenge
Mustang Challenge	2:17.832	Robert Noaker	Ford Mustang Dark Horse R	2025 Road America Mustang Challenge round
TCR Touring Car	2:17.984	Jaden Conwright	Audi RS 3 LMS TCR (2021)	2025 Road America 120
IMSA AAC	2:19.146	Michael Dingman	Ford Mustang	1992 Nissan Grand Prix of Road America
IMSA GTU	2:20.208	John Fergus	Dodge Daytona	1992 Nissan Grand Prix of Road America
Toyota GR Cup	2:31.530	Christian Weir	Toyota GR86	2024 Road America Toyota GR Cup North America round
Mazda MX-5 Cup	2:32.432	Maximilian Opalski	Mazda MX-5 (ND)	2023 Road America Mazda MX-5 Cup round
TU	2:43.700	John Morton	Datsun 510	1972 Road America Trans-Am round
IMSA Supercar	2:57.261	Hurley Haywood	Porsche 911 Turbo	1991 Nissan Grand Prix of Road America
Motorcycle Course (2003–present): 4.000 mi (6.437 km)
Superbike	2:09.025	Josh Herrin	Ducati Panigale V4 R	2023 Road America MotoAmerica Superbike round
Supersport	2:16.085	Darryn Binder	Ducati Panigale V2	2026 Road America MotoAmerica Supersport round
Twins Cup	2:23.814	Bodie Paige	Suzuki GSX-8R	2026 Road America MotoAmerica Twins Cup round
Supersport 300	2:38.493	Avery Dreher	Kawasaki Ninja 400R	2023 Road America MotoAmerica Junior Cup round

== Events ==
Current

- May: Sportscar Vintage Racing Association Spring Vintage Weekend, MotoAmerica Superbikes at Road America, Formula Regional Americas Championship, F4 United States Championship, 24 Hours of Lemons
- June: IndyCar Series Grand Prix of Road America, Trans-Am Series Road America SpeedTour, SCCA Super Tour WeatherTech Chicago Region SCCA June Sprints, Indy NXT, USF Pro 2000 Championship, USF2000 Championship, Atlantic Championship Series, F2000 Championship Series, F1600 Championship Series
- July: Sports Car Club of America, WeatherTech Vintage Weekend with Brian Redman,
- August: IMSA SportsCar Championship SportsCar Endurance Grand Prix, Michelin Pilot Challenge, Porsche Carrera Cup North America, Lamborghini Super Trofeo North America, Mustang Challenge North America, GT World Challenge America, GT America Series, GT4 America Series, TC America Series, Porsche Sprint Challenge North America, IMSA VP Racing SportsCar Challenge, McLaren Trophy America, Toyota Gazoo Racing Cup North America
- September: Ferrari Challenge North America, USF Pro 2000 Championship, USF2000 Championship, USF Juniors
- October: SCCA Runoffs, ChampCar Endurance Series

Future

- Mazda MX-5 Cup (2003, 2006, 2008–2012, 2014–2023, 2027)

Former

- American Le Mans Series
  - Road America 500 (2002–2013)
- ARCA Racing Series
  - Road America 100 (2013, 2017)
- Barber Pro Series (1986–2002)
- Can-Am (1967–1974, 1977–1983)
- CART/Champ Car World Series
  - Road America 200 (1982–2004, 2006–2007)
- Formula BMW Americas (2004, 2007–2009)
- IMSA GT Championship (1979–1993)
- IMSA GT3 Cup Challenge (2005–2006, 2009–2020)
- NASCAR Cup Series
  - Kwik Trip 250 (1956, 2021–2022)
- NASCAR Midwest Series (2001)
- NASCAR Xfinity Series
  - Road America 180 (2010–2023)
- Rolex Sports Car Series (2000–2001, 2011–2013)
- SCCA National Sports Car Championship (1955–1962)
- Stadium Super Trucks (2018–2020)
- United States Road Racing Championship (1963–1968)

=== Other events outside racing ===
Road America is host to several non-automotive events.

- The Tour de Road America - Bike Ride to Fight Cancer is a bike ride on the track to raise funds for the Livestrong Foundation, the Austin Hatcher Foundation, and the Vince Lombardi Cancer Clinic. The annual event has taken place every August since 2004 during the Champ Car and/or American Le Mans Series weekends, and has raised over $230,000 as of 2012. It raised over $37,000 in 2012. The 10th Tour de Road America is scheduled for August 9, 2013 during the American Le Mans / Grand Am weekend (August 9–11, 2013).
- The Road America Inline Challenge is an inline skating race on the track in June. A fun lap is also part of the event, which has taken place since 2006.
- The Annual Road America Walk/Run for the American Cancer Society has raised $2.5 million plus in its 33-year existence. The Walk/Run takes place in late October. The 2007 and 2008 events included a Mid-American Stock Car Series exhibition.

== In popular culture ==
=== Video games ===
The Road America track has been included in multiple racing video games, including Automobilista 2, the Forza Motorsport series, CART Fury Championship Racing, CART Precision Racing, iRacing, Raceroom Racing Experience, NASCAR Heat 2, NASCAR Heat 3, NASCAR Heat 4,NASCAR Heat 5, Need for Speed: Shift, Shift 2: Unleashed, Project CARS, Flag to Flag ,Project CARS 2, TOCA Race Driver 2, TOCA World Touring Cars, and Ride 3.

=== Wisconsin license plate ===
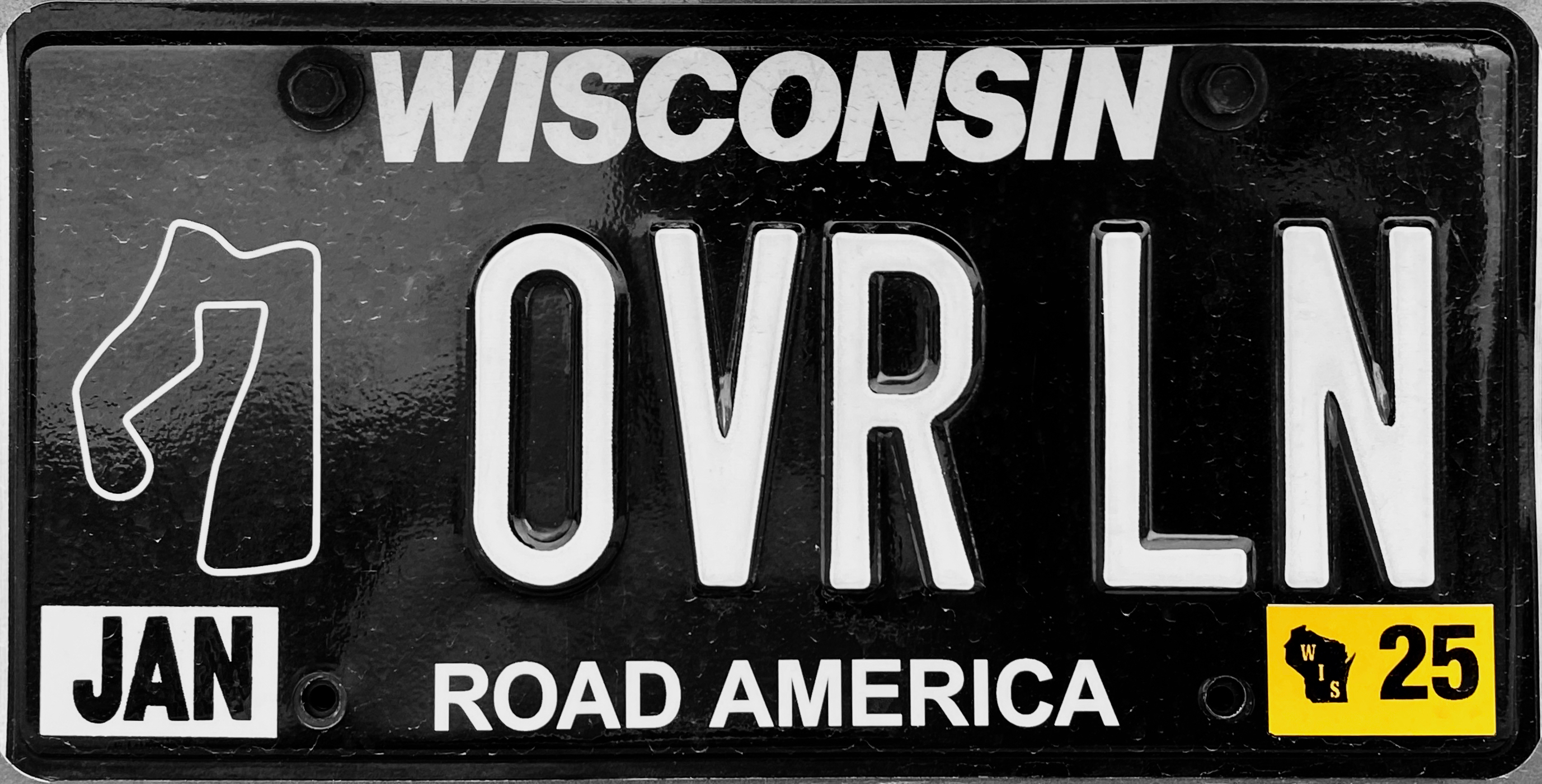
An example of Wisconsin's Road America license plate with a vanity slogan; if no message is so chosen by the driver, a five-digit number, followed by "RA" within the rightmost letter space is produced instead.

On October 4, 2021, the Wisconsin Department of Transportation introduced a special license plate honoring Road America, colored black and featuring an outline map of the Road America track (with a northward orientation; this article's infobox map features the track orientated westward) on its left side. The plate itself is fully black with all-white lettering, and has proven to be popular among state drivers for its 'blackout' design, especially among car clubs, and making vanity plate messages stand out, becoming the most requested specialty design in 2023, above specialty plates for the state's sports teams and a Harley-Davidson-specific design.

== Photo gallery ==
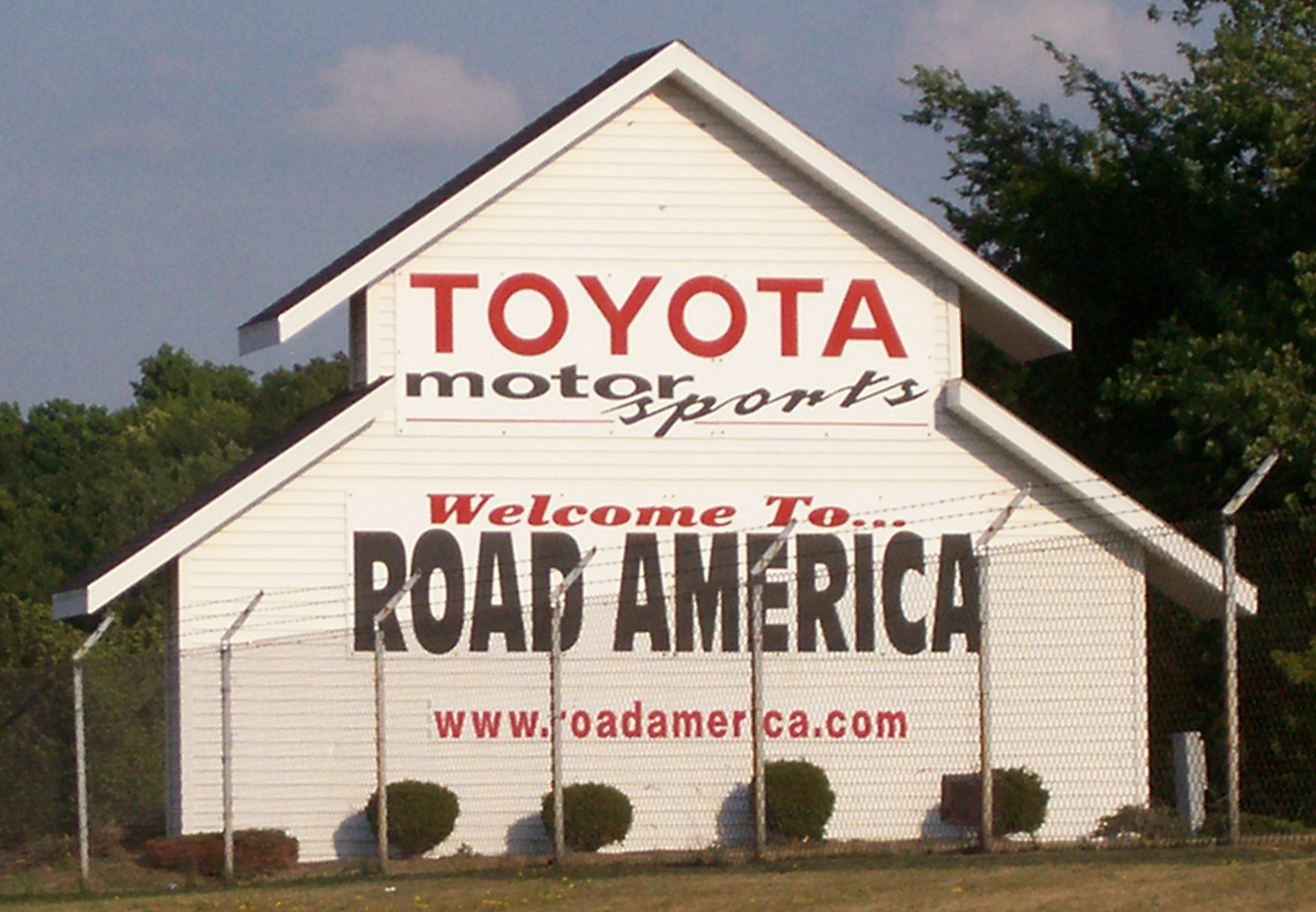
Welcome sign

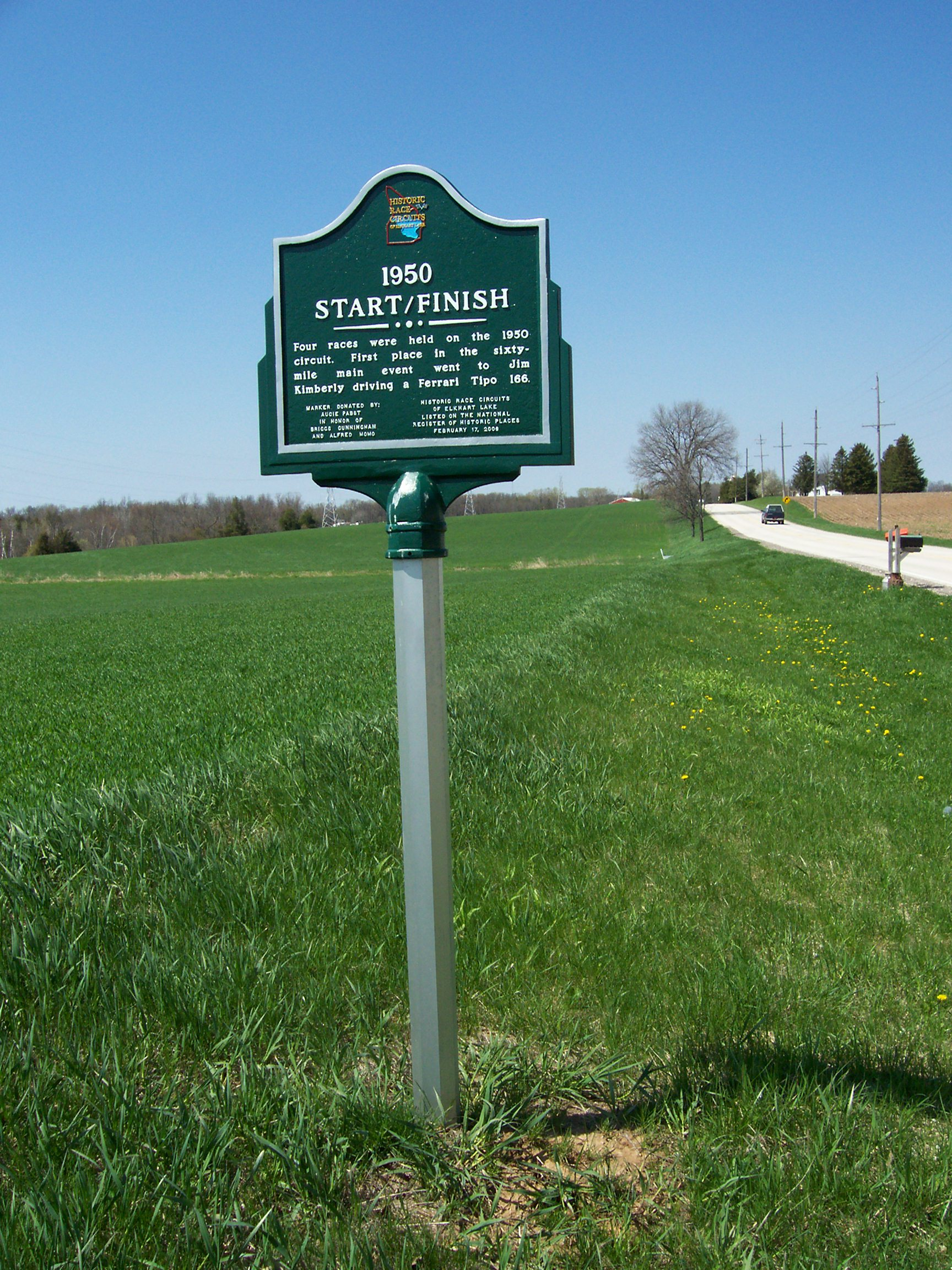
The sign marking the start/finish line on the original road course

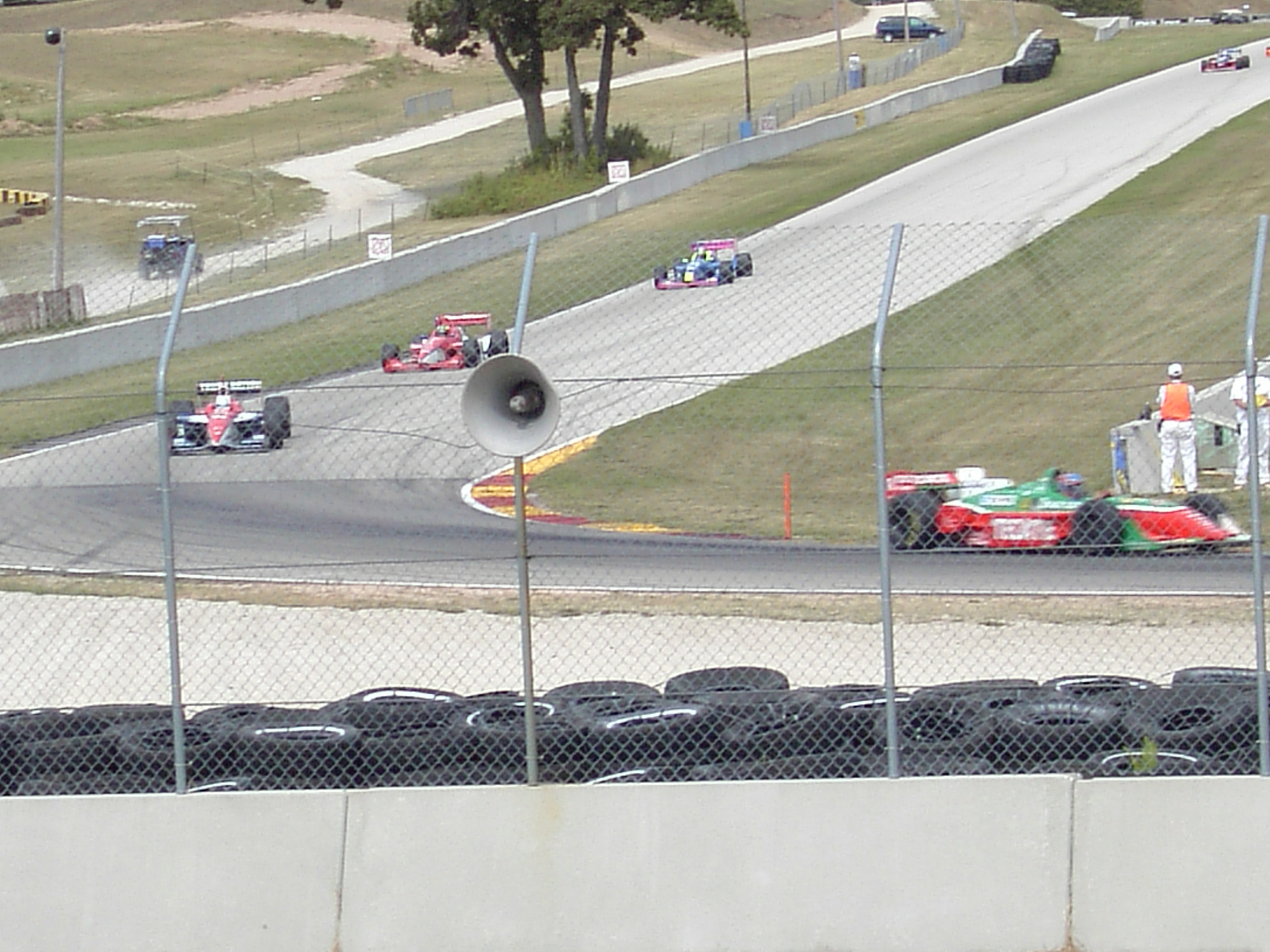
A group of Group 9 BOSS cars going around turn eight at the Kohler International Challenge

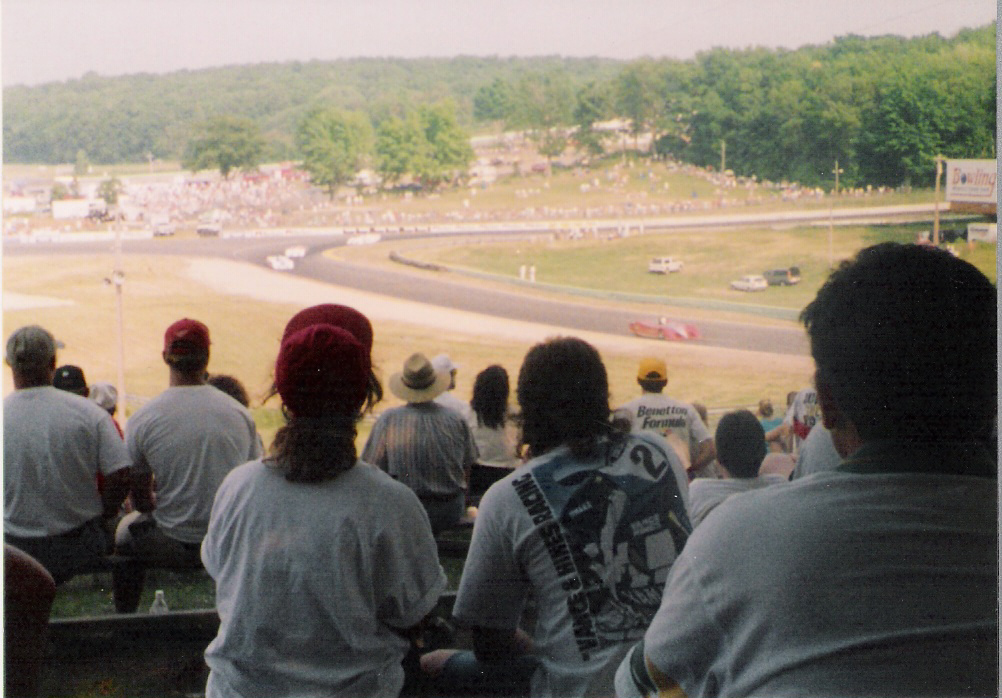
Fans looking east at Turn Five during the 1995 June Sprints

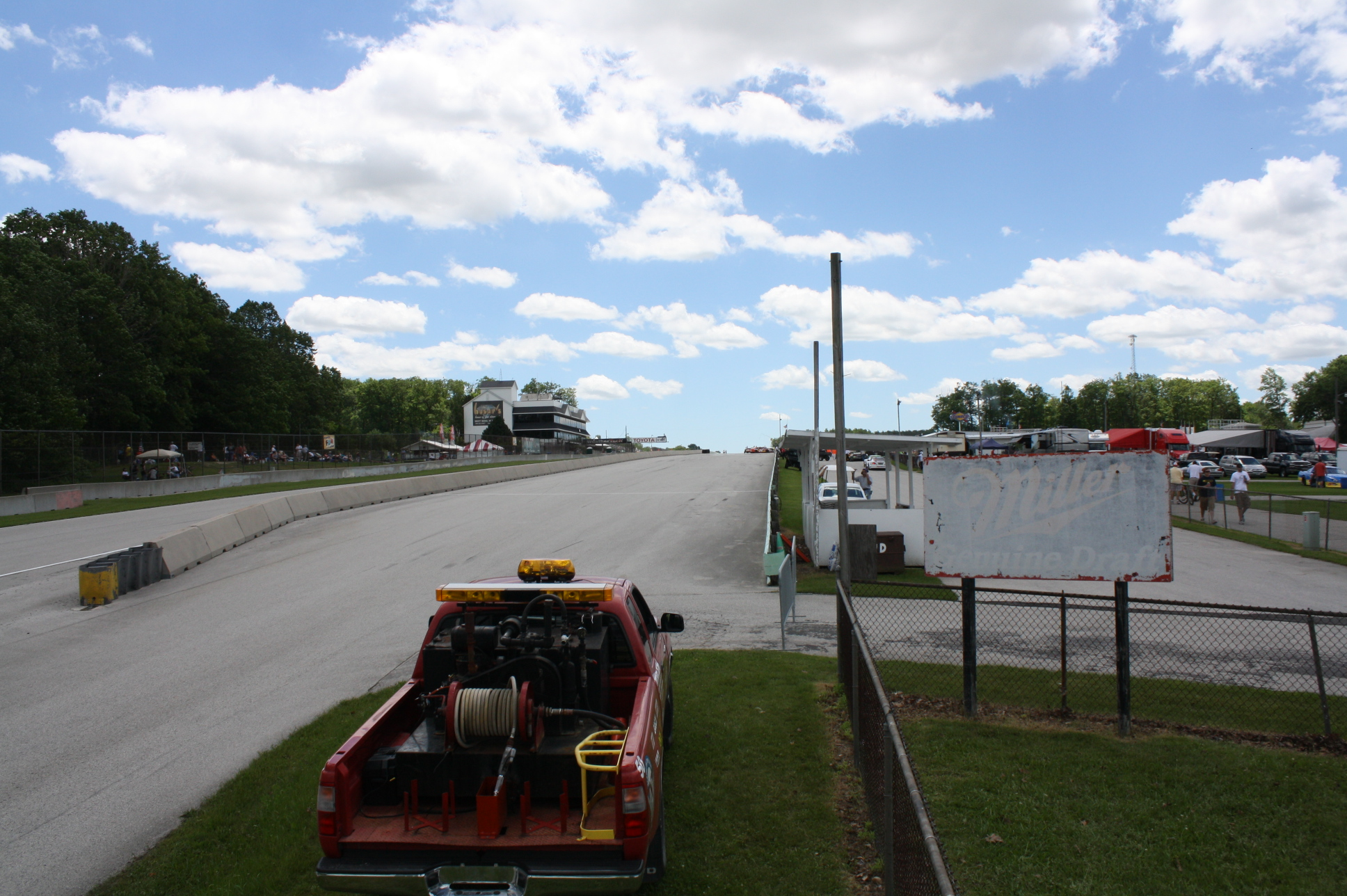
Looking up the frontstretch hill

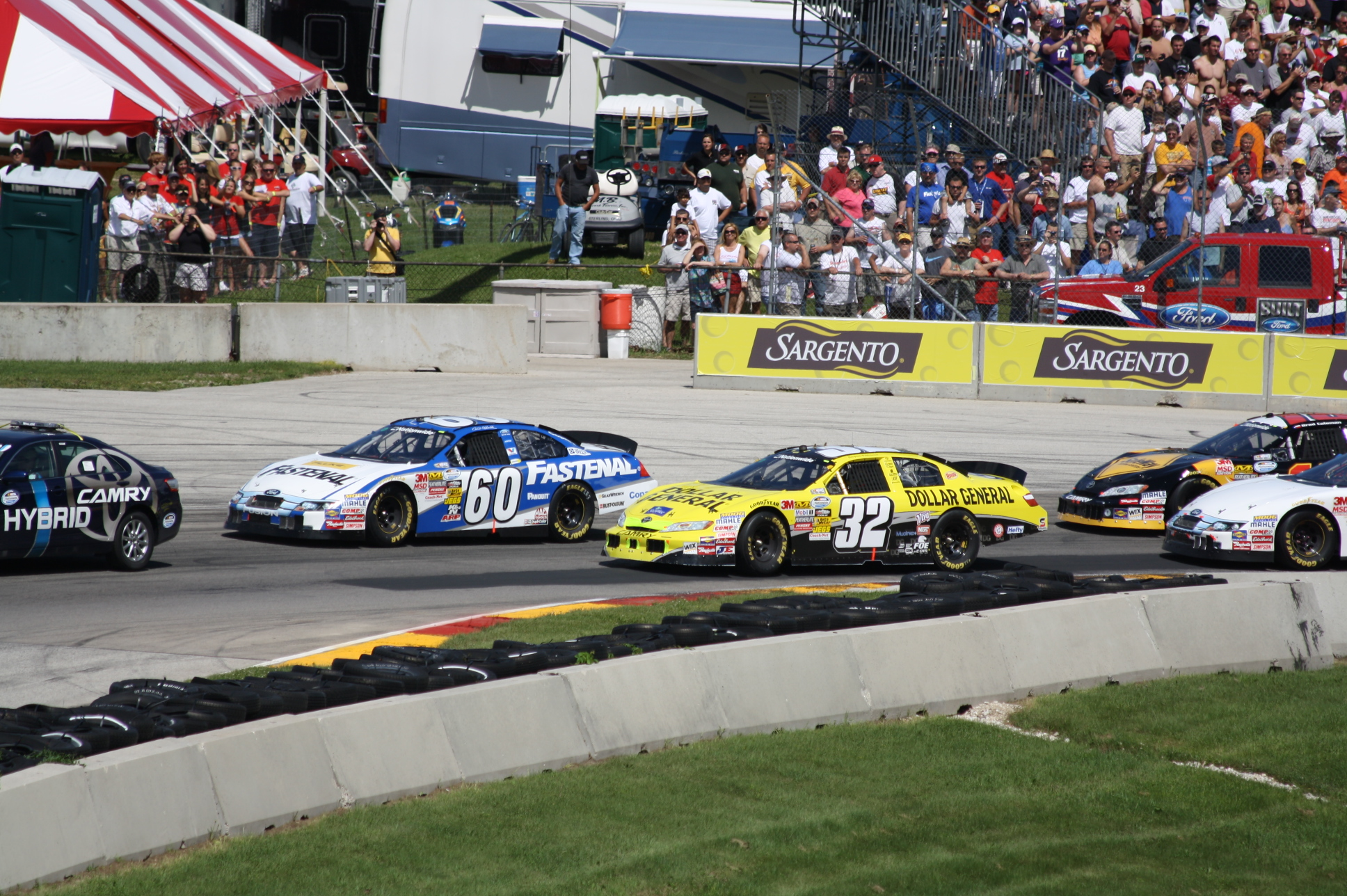
2010 NASCAR Xfinity Series race

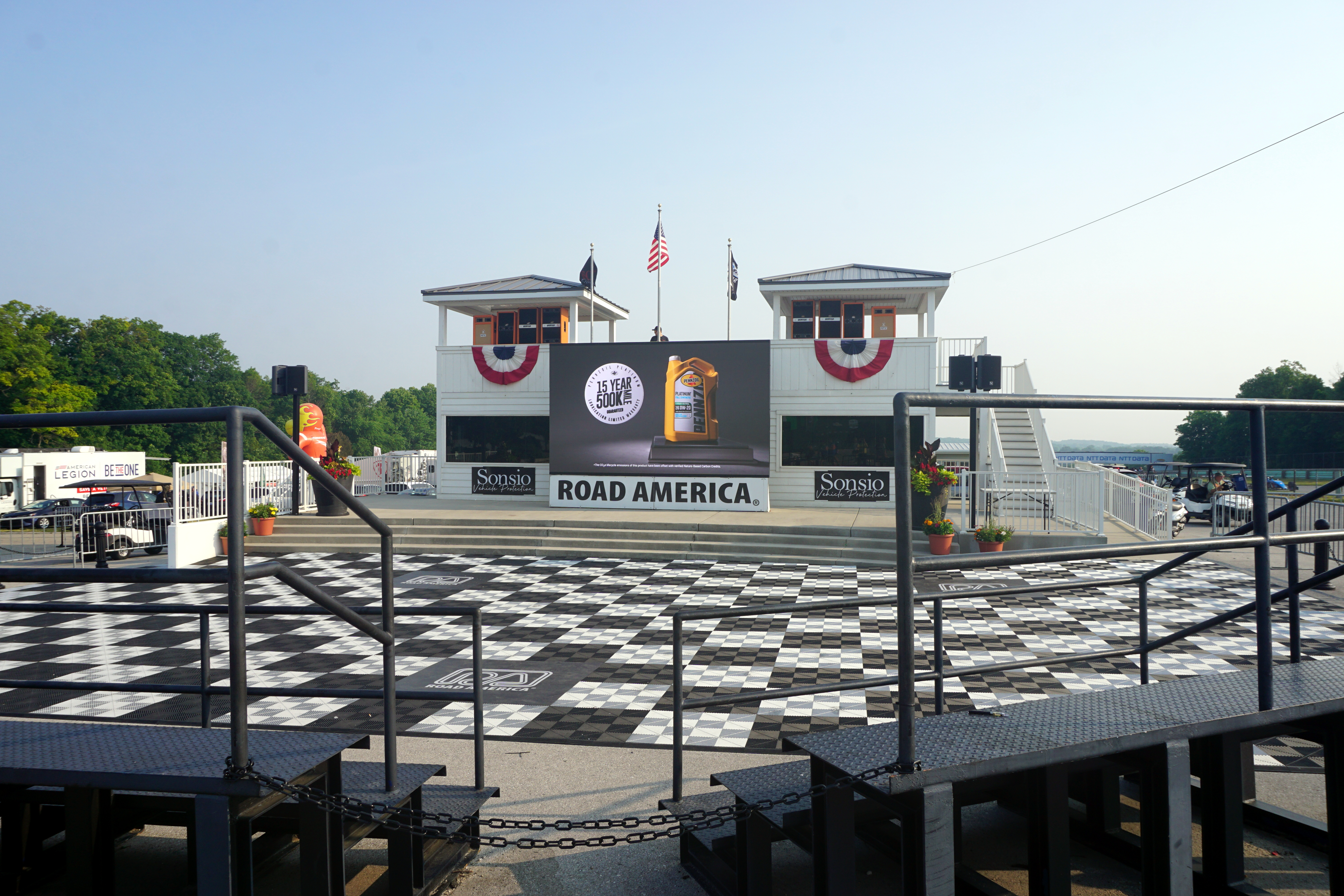
Victory lane

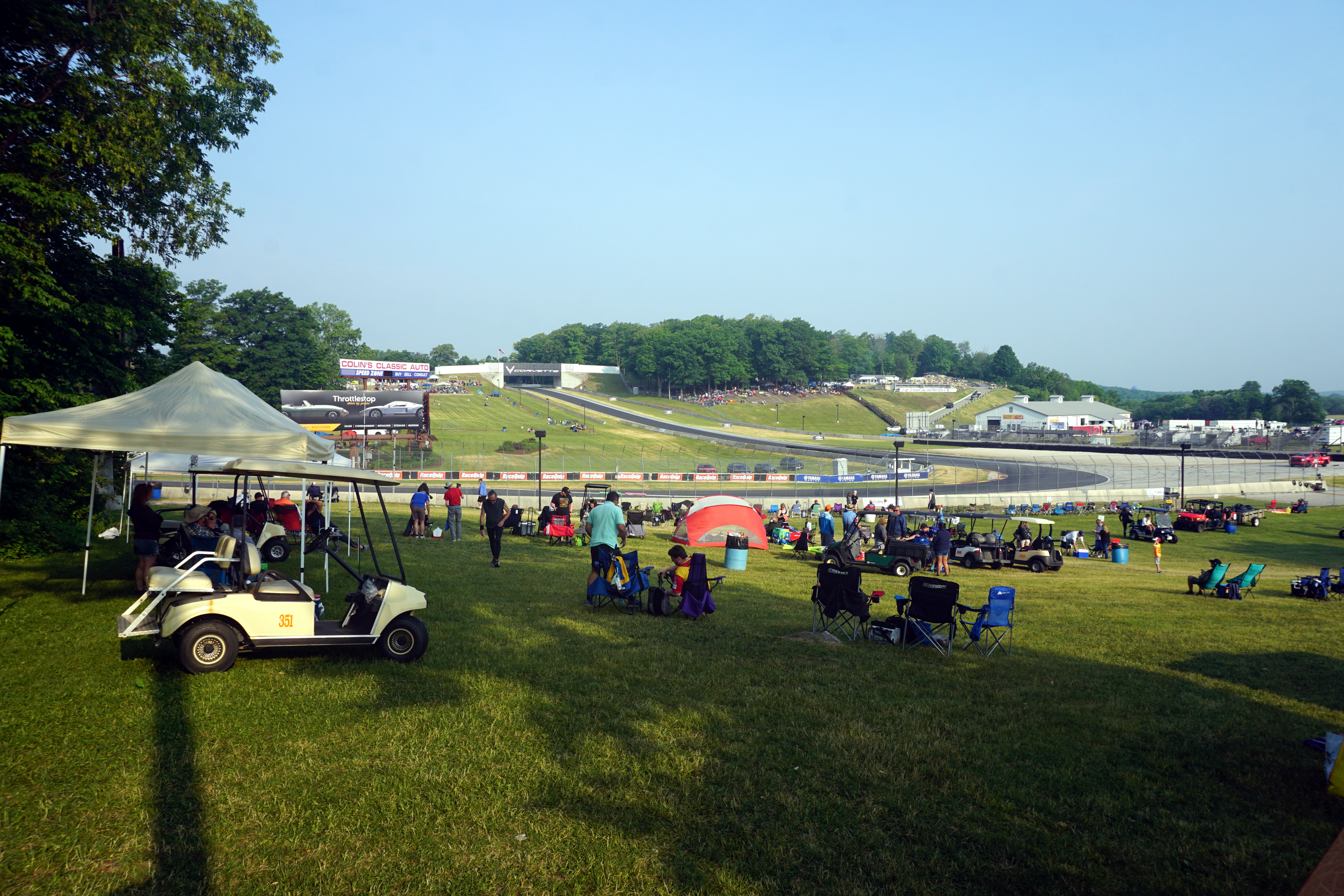
Turn 5
