= 1960 SCCA National Sports Car Championship =

Seasons
- ← 1959 1961 →

The 1960 SCCA National Sports Car Championship season was the tenth season of the Sports Car Club of America's National Sports Car Championship. It began April 3, 1960, and ended November 13, 1960, after seventeen races.

== Schedule ==
Rnd	Race	Length^{A}	Circuit	Location	Date
1	SCCA National Races	90 mi (140 km)	Corry Field Naval Air Station	Pensacola, Florida	April 3
2	President's Cup National Races	68 mi (109 km)	Marlboro Motor Raceway	Upper Marlboro, Maryland	April 16
3	SCCA National Races	200 km (120 mi)	Virginia International Raceway	Danville, Virginia	May 1
4	Cumberland National Sports Car Races	56 mi (90 km)	Greater Cumberland Regional Airport	Wiley Ford, West Virginia	May 15
5	SCCA National Races	50 mi (80 km)	Bridgehampton Race Circuit	Bridgehampton, New York	May 30
6	International June Sprints	140 mi (230 km)	Road America	Elkhart Lake, Wisconsin	June 19
7	SCCA National Races	48 mi (77 km)	Lime Rock Park	Lakeville, Connecticut	July 2
8	SCCA National Races	180 km (110 mi)	Continental Divide Raceway	Castle Rock, Colorado	July 17
9	Meadowdale SCCA National Championship Race	100 mi (160 km)	Meadowdale International Raceway	Carpentersville, Illinois	July 18
10	Governor's Cup National SCCA Races	150 km (93 mi)	Montgomery Airport	Montgomery, New York	August 7
11	SCCA National Races	52 mi (84 km)	Kentucky State Fairgrounds	Louisville, Kentucky	August 21
12	SCCA National Races	100 mi (160 km)	Thompson International Speedway	Thompson, Connecticut	September 5
13	Road America 500	500 mi (800 km)	Road America	Elkhart Lake, Wisconsin	September 11
14	Watkins Glen Grand Prix	100 mi (160 km)	Watkins Glen International	Watkins Glen, New York	September 24
15	SCCA National Races	54 mi (87 km)	Cabaniss Naval Airfield	Corpus Christi, Texas	October 9
16	SCCA National Races	39 mi (63 km)	Ascarate Park Raceway	El Paso, Texas	October 30
17	SCCA National Races	115 mi (185 km)	Daytona International Speedway	Daytona Beach, Florida	November 13

^A Feature race

== Season results ==
Feature race overall winners in bold.

Rnd	Circuit	BM Winning Team	BP Winning Team	CM Winning Team	CP Winning Team	DM Winning Team	DP Winning Team	EM Winning Team	EP Winning Team	FM Winning Team	FP Winning Team	GM Winning Team	GP Winning Team	HM Winning Team	HP Winning Team	IM Winning Team	Results
Rnd	Circuit	BM Winning Driver(s)	BP Winning Driver(s)	CM Winning Driver(s)	CP Winning Driver(s)	DM Winning Driver(s)	DP Winning Driver(s)	EM Winning Driver(s)	EP Winning Driver(s)	FM Winning Driver(s)	FP Winning Driver(s)	GM Winning Driver(s)	GP Winning Driver(s)	HM Winning Driver(s)	HP Winning Driver(s)	IM Winning Driver(s)	Results
1	Pensacola	unknown	unknown	unknown	unknown	**Maserati**	unknown	Porsche	unknown	unknown	unknown	unknown	unknown	unknown	unknown	unknown	Results
1	Pensacola	unknown	unknown	unknown	unknown	**(Switzerland) Gaston Andrey**	unknown	(United States) Roger Penske	unknown	unknown	unknown	unknown	unknown	unknown	unknown	unknown	Results
2	Marlboro	no finishers	#90 Ferrari	#11 Bill Mitchell	#56 Porsche	^{A}	#57 A.C.-Bristol	**#6 Porsche**	#67 MG	no entries	#82 Fiat-Abarth	#7 Elva	#83 Fiat-Abarth	#76 Osca	#84 Fiat-Abarth	no entries	Results
2	Marlboro	no finishers	(United States) Bob Grossman	(United States) Dick Thompson	(United States) Gene Hobbs	^{A}	(United States) Charles Kurtz	**(United States) Roger Penske**	(United States) Sherman Decker	no entries	(United States) Paul Richards	(United States) Charlie Kolb	(United States) Charles Callanan	(United States) Oliver Schmidt	(United States) Chandler Lawrence	no entries	Results
3	VIR	^{B}	#19 Ferrari	#11 Bill Mitchell	no entries	no finishers	#57 A.C.-Bristol	**#140 Porsche**	#4 Daimler	no finishers	#42 Siata	#7 Elva	#44 Sunbeam	#76 Osca	#84 Fiat-Abarth	no entries	Results
3	VIR	^{B}	(United States) Bob Grossman	(United States) Dick Thompson	no entries	no finishers	(United States) Charles Kurtz	**(United States) Bob Holbert**	(United States) Duncan Black	no finishers	(United States) Douglas Diffenderfer	(United States) Charlie Kolb	(United States) Vince Tamburo	(United States) Oliver Schmidt	(United States) Chandler Lawrence	no entries	Results
4	Cumberland	#11 Bill Mitchell	#145 Tad Davies	no entries	#77 Bruce Jennings	**#60 Briggs Cunningham**	#231 Elliott Pew	#6 Elmer Wolf	#4 Duncan Black	no finishers	#9 Charlie Kolb	#7 Charles Kolb	#144 Vince Tamburo	#98 Martin W. Tanner	#84 Franklin Roosevelt	#443 Phillips G. Jeffrey	Results
4	Cumberland	(United States) Dick Thompson	(United States) Ray Rairdon	no entries	(United States) Bruce Jennings	**(United States) Walt Hansgen**	(United States) Elliott Pew	(United States) Roger Penske	(United States) Duncan Black	no finishers	(United States) Charlie Kolb	(United States) Charlie Kolb	(United States) Vince Tamburo	(United States) Martin Tanner	(United States) Chandler Lawrence	(United States) Phillips Jeffrey	Results
5	Bridgehampton	no entries	#41 Ferrari	Bill Mitchell	Porsche	**#60 Briggs Cunningham**	unknown	Porsche	unknown	unknown	unknown	Lola	unknown	unknown	unknown	unknown	Results
5	Bridgehampton	no entries	(United States) Bob Grossman	(United States) Dick Thompson	(United States) Bruce Jennings	**(United States) Walt Hansgen**	unknown	(United States) Roger Penske	unknown	unknown	unknown	(United States) Millard Ripley	unknown	unknown	unknown	unknown	Results
6	Road America	**#1 Meister Brauser**	Ferrari	#11 Bill Mitchell	Porsche	#25 Mike Garber	Jaguar	#6 Roger Penske	Daimler	#77 Concours Motors	#47 Elva	#78 Lola	#7 Alfa Romeo	#9 Walsh Special	#85 Austin-Healey	no entries	Results
6	Road America	**(United States) Augie Pabst**	(United States) George Reed	(United States) Dick Thompson	(United States) Bill Romig	(Switzerland) Gaston Andrey	(United States) Lloyd Barton	(United States) Roger Penske	(United States) Duncan Black	(United States) Bill Wuesthoff	(United States) Ernie Harris	(United States) Millard Ripley	(United States) Philip Seven	(United States) Ed Walsh	(United States) Frank Phillips	no entries	Results
7	Lime Rock	**#49 Kelso Auto Dynamics**	#40 Chevrolet	#52 Jaguar	#77 Porsche	^{C}	#57 A.C.-Bristol	#14 Porsche	#25 Alfa Romeo	#33 Porsche	#64 Elva	#78 Lola	#22 Alfa Romeo	#12 Bandini-Saab	#65 Fiat-Abarth	no entries	Results
7	Lime Rock	**(United States) George Constantine**	(United States) Bob Johnson	(United States) Gordon MacKenzie	(United States) Bruce Jennings	^{C}	(United States) Charles Kurtz	(United States) Bob Holbert	(United States) Reed Rollo	(United States) Newton Davis	(United States) Mark Donohue	(United States) Millard Ripley	(United States) Don Erlbeck	(United States) Henry Rudkin	(United States) Chris Noyes	no entries	Results
8	Castle Rock	no finishers	Chevrolet	Allard-Chrysler	unknown	unknown	A.C.-Bristol	**#14 Porsche**	Alfa Romeo	Porsche	Porsche	Elva	Alfa Romeo	Lotus-Fiat	Fiat-Abarth	unknown	Results
8	Castle Rock	no finishers	(United States) Dan Collins	(United States) Chuck Frederick	unknown	unknown	(United States) Gene Kurland	**(United States) Bob Holbert**	(United States) Tony Polumbus	(United States) Charles Lyon	(United States) John Max Wolf	(United States) Charlie Kolb	(United States) Joyce Thompson	(United States) Harry Jones	(United States) Don McCormick	unknown	Results
9	Meadowdale	**#1 Meister Brauser**	unknown	Jaguar	unknown	Maserati	unknown	Porsche	unknown	Porsche	unknown	unknown	unknown	unknown	unknown	unknown	Results
9	Meadowdale	**(United States) Augie Pabst**	unknown	(United States) Tossie Alex	unknown	(United States) Dave Causey	unknown	(United States) Roger Penske	unknown	(United States) Bill Wuesthoff	unknown	unknown	unknown	unknown	unknown	unknown	Results
10	Montgomery	#15 Meister Brauser	#40 Chevrolet	#141 Ferrari-Chevrolet	#12 Porsche	**#60 Briggs Cunningham**	#231 A.C.-Bristol	#70 Lotus	#4 Daimler	#171 Porsche	#42 Siata	#78 Lola	#87 Fiat-Abarth	#761 Osca	#84 Fiat-Abarth	no entries	Results
10	Montgomery	(United States) Augie Pabst	(United States) Bob Johnson	(United States) Bud Faust	(United States) Bill Romig	**(United States) Walt Hansgen**	(United States) Elliott Pew	(United States) Tom Fleming	(United States) Duncan Black	(United States) James Forno	(United States) Douglas Diffenderfer	(United States) Millard Ripley	(United States) Paul Richards	(United States) Oliver Schmidt	(United States) Chandler Lawrence	no entries	Results
11	Louisville	Meister Brauser	unknown	unknown	unknown	unknown	unknown	**Porsche**	unknown	Porsche	unknown	Lola	Sunbeam	unknown	unknown	unknown	Results
11	Louisville	(United States) Augie Pabst	unknown	unknown	unknown	unknown	unknown	**(United States) Bob Holbert**	unknown	(United States) Bill Wuesthoff	unknown	(United States) Millard Ripley	(United States) Don Sesslar	unknown	unknown	unknown	Results
12	Thompson	**#49 Kelso Auto Dynamics**	#39 Chevrolet	^{D}	#77 Porsche	#60 Briggs Cunningham	#74 A.C.-Bristol	^{E}	#4 Daimler	#6 Porsche	#42 Elva	#90 Lotus	#48 Sunbeam	#76 Osca	#84 Fiat-Abarth	no entries	Results
12	Thompson	**(United States) George Constantine**	(United States) Dick Jalbert	^{D}	(United States) Bruce Jennings	(United States) Walt Hansgen	(United States) Elliott Pew	^{E}	(United States) Duncan Black	(United States) Roger Penske	(United States) Mark Donohue	(United States) Robert Barker	(United States) Vince Tamburo	(United States) Oliver Schmidt	(United States) Chandler Lawrence	no entries	Results
13	Road America	#33 James Place	Chevrolet	#60 Briggs Cunningham	Porsche	**#24 Dave Causey**	A.C.-Bristol	#61 Briggs Cunningham	Daimler	#27 Ernest Erickson	Porsche	Lotus	Alfa Romeo	#60 Briggs Cunningham	Fiat-Abarth	no entries	Results
13	Road America	(United States) James Place (United States) Jack Zalinger	(United States) Bob Johnson	(United States) Walt Hansgen	(United States) Dick Talbot	**(United States) Dave Causey** **(United States) Luke Stear**	(United States) Bill Steele	(United States) John Fitch (United States) William Kimberly	(United States) E. G. Davis	(United States) Ernie Erickson (United States) Don Sesslar	(United States) Harold Zimdars	(United States) M. R. J. Wyllie (United States) Margaret Wyllie	(United States) Harlan Besse	(United States) Denise McCluggage	(United States) Dick Stitt	no entries	Results
14	Watkins Glen	**#50 Meister Brauser**	#72 Bob Johnson	#62 Briggs Cunningham	#77 Bruce R. Jennings	#17 Ferrari	#249 Bill Harwell	^{F}	#4 Duncan Black	#6 John M. Wyatt III	#224 Cambridge Motors	#2 M. R. J. Wyllie	#95 Vincent Tamburo	#98 Oliver C. Schmidt	#84 Franklin D. Roosevelt	#58 Phillips G. Jeffrey	Results
14	Watkins Glen	**(United States) Augie Pabst**	(United States) Bob Johnson	(United States) Ed Hugus	(United States) Bruce Jennings	(United States) Dean McCarthy	(United States) Bill Harwell	^{F}	(United States) Duncan Black	(United States) Roger Penske	(Canada) John Cannon	(United States) M. R. J. Wyllie	(United States) Vince Tamburo	(United States) Oliver Schmidt	(United States) Chandler Lawrence	(United States) Phillips Jeffrey	Results
15	Corpus Christi	unknown	unknown	unknown	unknown	unknown	unknown	unknown	unknown	unknown	unknown	unknown	unknown	unknown	unknown	unknown	Results
16	El Paso	**Meister Brauser**	unknown	unknown	unknown	unknown	unknown	unknown	unknown	unknown	unknown	unknown	unknown	unknown	unknown	unknown	Results
16	El Paso	**(United States) Augie Pabst**	unknown	unknown	unknown	unknown	unknown	unknown	unknown	unknown	unknown	unknown	unknown	unknown	unknown	unknown	Results
17	Daytona	**#0 Meister Brauser**	unknown	#40 Lister-Corvette	unknown	#20 Maserati	unknown	#44 Porsche	unknown	Porsche	unknown	#1 Lotus-Climax	unknown	#9 Osca	unknown	no entries	Results
17	Daytona	**(United States) Augie Pabst**	unknown	(United States) Art Huttinger	unknown	(United States) Alan Connell	unknown	(United States) Roger Penske	unknown	(United States) Chuck Cassel	unknown	(United States) William Story	unknown	(United States) George Peck	unknown	no entries	Results

^A D Modified were classified with C Modified at Marlboro.
^B B and C Modified were classified together at VIR; the combined class was won by Dick Thompson's CM Chevrolet Corvette Sing Ray. The highest-finishing BM car was Bud Gates's Lister-Corvette in 2nd.
^C D Modified were classified with C Modified at Lime Rock.
^D C Modified were classified with B Modified at Thompson.
^E E Modified were classified with D Modified at Thompson.
^F E and F Modified were classified together at Watkins Glen; the combined class was won by Roger Penske's FM Porsche 718. The highest-finishing EM car was William Kimberly in Briggs Cunningham's Maserati Tipo 61.

== Champions ==
Class	Driver	Car
B Modified	(United States) Augie Pabst	Scarab Mk II-Chevrolet
B Production	(United States) Bob Johnson	Chevrolet Corvette
C Modified	(United States) Dick Thompson	Chevrolet Corvette Stingray Concept
C Production	(United States) Bruce Jennings	Porsche 356 Carrera
D Modified	(Switzerland) Gaston Andrey	Maserati Tipo 61
D Production	(United States) Elliott Pew	AC Ace-Bristol
E Modified	(United States) Bob Holbert	Porsche 718 RSK, Porsche 718 RS 60
E Production	(United States) Duncan Black	Daimler SP250
F Modified	(United States) Roger Penske	Porsche 718 RSK, Porsche 718 RS 60
F Production	(United States) Doug Diffenderfer	Siata 208s
G Modified	(United States) Millard Ripley	Lotus 17, Lola Mk.1
G Production	(United States) Vince Tamburo	Sunbeam Alpine
H Modified	(United States) Oliver Schmidt	Osca MT4, Lola Mk.1-Osca
H Production	(United States) Chandler Lawrence	Fiat-Abarth
I Modified	(United States) Phillips Jeffrey	Berkeley Excelsior
