= 1954 SCCA National Sports Car Championship =

Seasons
- ← 1953 1955 →

The 1954 SCCA National Sports Car Championship season was the fourth season of the Sports Car Club of America's National Sports Car Championship. It began January 31, 1954, and ended November 7, 1954, after twelve races. For the first time, championships were awarded to drivers in each class, rather than an overall championship as before.

== Classes ==
Class	Displacement
A	over 5000cc
B	4000–5000cc
C	3000–4000cc
D	2000–3000cc
E	1500–2000cc
F	1100–1500cc
G	750–1100cc
H	under 750cc

== Schedule ==
Rnd	Race	Length^{A}	Circuit	Location	Date
1	Florida National Sports Car Races	200 mi (320 km)	MacDill Air Force Base	Tampa, Florida	January 31
2	Savannah National Sports Car Races	150 mi (240 km)	Hunter Air Force Base	Savannah, Georgia	March 14
3	Lone Star National Sports Car Race	100 mi (160 km)	Bergstrom Air Force Base	Austin, Texas	March 28
4	Pebble Beach Sports Car Road Race	100 mi (160 km)	Pebble Beach road circuit	Pebble Beach, California	April 11
5	National Capital Sports Car Races	200 mi (320 km)	Andrews Air Force Base	Washington, D.C.	May 2
6	Chanute National Sports Car Races	150 mi (240 km)	Chanute Air Force Base	Rantoul, Illinois	June 6
7	New England National Sports Car Races	175 mi (282 km)	Westover Air Force Base	Chicopee Falls, Massachusetts	June 13
8	Offutt National Sports Car Races	200 mi (320 km)	Offutt Air Force Base	Omaha, Nebraska	July 4
9	Lockbourne Sports Car Races	150 mi (240 km)	Lockbourne Air Force Base	Columbus, Ohio	August 8
10	Thompson National Races	15 mi (24 km)	Thompson International Speedway	Thompson, Connecticut	September 5
11	International Sports Car Grand Prix of Watkins Glen	100 mi (160 km)	Watkins Glen road circuit	Watkins Glen, New York	September 18
12	Orange Empire National Races	125 mi (201 km)	March Air Force Base	Moreno Valley, California	November 7

^A Feature race

== Season results ==
Feature race overall winners in bold.

Rnd	Circuit	BM Winning Team	CM Winning Team	CP Winning Team	DM Winning Team	DP Winning Team	EM Winning Team	EP Winning Team	FM Winning Team	FP Winning Team	GM Winning Team	HM Winning Team	Results
Rnd	Circuit	BM Winning Driver(s)	CM Winning Driver(s)	CP Winning Driver(s)	DM Winning Driver(s)	DP Winning Driver(s)	EM Winning Driver(s)	EP Winning Driver(s)	FM Winning Driver(s)	FP Winning Driver(s)	GM Winning Driver(s)	HM Winning Driver(s)	Results
1	MacDill	#3 Cunningham	**#5 Ferrari**	#12 Jaguar	#6 Briggs Cunningham/Momo	no entries	#31 Saita	no entries	#1 Briggs Cunningham	#18 MG	#77 O.S.C.A.	#81 Renault	Results
1	MacDill	(United States) Phil Walters	**(United States) Jim Kimberly**	(United States) Austin Young	(United States) John Fitch	no entries	(United States) Robert Blackwood	no entries	(United States) Briggs Cunningham	(United States) Ralph Durbin	(United States) Rees Makins	(United States) Henry Gauding	Results
2	Hunter	#51 Briggs Cunningham	**#5 Ferrari**	#39 Jaguar	#44 Ferrari	#64 Austin-Healey	#97 Kieft	no entries	#2 O.S.C.A.	#33 Porsche	#111 PB Crosley	^{A}	Results
2	Hunter	(United States) Sherwood Johnston	**(United States) Jim Kimberly**	(United States) Warren Smith	(United States) Bill Lloyd	(United States) Billy Dantone	(United States) Bill Carpenter	no entries	(United States) George Moffett	(United States) Dick Pace	(United States) George Schrafft	^{A}	Results
3	Bergstrom	#20 Allard	**#5 Ferrari**	#53 Jaguar	#52 Ferrari	no entries	no entries	no entries	#9 Porsche	#49 Porsche	no entries	#66 D.B. Panhard	Results
3	Bergstrom	(United States) Walt Gray	**(United States) Jim Kimberly**	(United States) Curtis Attaway	(United States) Bill Jarnigan	no entries	no entries	no entries	(United States) John von Neumann	(United States) Art Bunker	no entries	(France) François Crouzet	Results
4	Pebble Beach	#107 Allard	**#26 Ferrari**	^{B}	#1 Edwards	^{B}	#5 Ferrari	^{B}	#117 O.S.C.A.	^{B}	#124 Giaur	#51 Crosley Special	Results
4	Pebble Beach	(United States) John Barneson	**(United States) Sterling Edwards**	^{B}	Wagner	^{B}	(United States) Randy McDougall	^{B}	(United States) Chick Leson	^{B}	Hicks	(United States) Harry Eyerly	Results
5	Andrews	#17 Jack R. Ensley	**#1 Bill Spear**	#178 Jaguar	#2 William B. Lloyd	#85 David Herson	#46 Donald McKnought	#146 James S. P. Robinson	#42 Briggs Cunningham	#65 Dick Thompson	#107 Rees T. Makins	#74 Candler H. Poole, Jr.	Results
5	Andrews	(United States) Jack Ensley	**(United States) Bill Spear**	(United States) Stephen Spitler	(United States) Bill Lloyd	(United States) William Kinchloe	(United States) Don McKnought	(United States) Roger Wing	(United States) Briggs Cunningham	(United States) Dick Thompson	(United States) Rees Makins	(United States) Candy Poole	Results
6	Chanute	#17 Jack R. Ensley	**#5 James H. Kimberly**	#121 Jack Pry	#136 J. M. R. Lyeth, Jr.	unknown	#10 Robert B. Kuhn	unknown	unknown	#12 Max J. Goldman, Jr. #126 Ralph Durbin	#47 Rees T. Makins	unknown	Results
6	Chanute	(United States) Jack Ensley	**(United States) Jim Kimberly**	(United States) Charles Wallace	(United States) Charles Hassan	unknown	(United States) Bob Kuhn	unknown	unknown	(United States) Max Goldman (Porsche) (United States) Ralph Durbin (MG)^{C}	(United States) Rees Makins	unknown	Results
7	Westover	no entries	**#5 Ferrari**	#40 Jaguar	#25 Ferrari	#22 Austin-Healey	#85 Siata	#95 Triumph	#4 Lester MG	#54 Porsche	#91 O.S.C.A.	#3 Bandini	Results
7	Westover	no entries	**(United States) Jim Kimberly**	(United States) Charles Wallace	(United States) Bill Lloyd	(United States) Fred Allen	(United States) George Schrafft	(United States) Ron McConkey	(United States) Duncan Black	(United States) John Bye	(United States) Jim Kimberly	(United States) Henry Rudkin	Results
8	Offutt	#60 Charles Moran, Jr.	**#55 Tony Parravano**	#43 Curtis L. Attaway, Jr.	#20 J. M. R. Lyeth, Jr.	no finishers	#7 C. Ted Boynton	no finishers	#66 Phil Stewart	#90 Arthur S. Bunker, Jr.	#77 Rees T. Makins	#33 Roy Cherryholmes	Results
8	Offutt	(United States) Charles Moran	**(United States) Jack McAfee**	(United States) Curtis Attaway	(United States) Richard Lyeth	no finishers	(United States) Ted Boynton	no finishers	(United States) Phil Stewart	(United States) Art Bunker	(United States) Rees Makins	(United States) Roy Cherryholmes	Results
9	Lockbourne	#68 Phil Walters	**#5 James H. Kimberly**	#79 C. C. Wallace	no finishers	#157 Austin-Healey	#26 Lt. Col. Robert B. Kuhn	#17 Triumph	#91 James Simpson, Jr.	#2 Dr. R. K. Thompson	#4 Rees T. Makins	#131 Jerry Rigden	Results
9	Lockbourne	(United States) Sherwood Johnston	**(United States) Jim Kimberly**	(United States) Charles Wallace	no finishers	(United States) Robert Fergus	(United States) Bob Kuhn	(United States) Jim Brooks	(United States) James Simpson	(United States) Dick Thompson	(United States) Rees Makins	(United States) Jerry Rigden	Results
10	Thompson^{D}	#17 Kurtis Kraft	#111 Ferrari	#23 Jaguar	#9 Ferrari	#45 Austin-Healey	#11 Maserati	no finishers	#1 Briggs Cunningham	#76 Porsche #51 MG	#14 O.S.C.A.	#74 PBX	Results
10	Thompson^{D}	(United States) Jack Ensley	(United States) Bill Spear	(United States) Charles Wallace	(United States) Adrian Melville	(United States) Robert Fergus	(United States) Fred Procter	no finishers	(United States) Briggs Cunningham	(United States) Chandler Lawrence (Overall) (United States) Mike Rodney^{C}	(United States) Rees Makins	(United States) Candy Poole	Results
11	Watkins Glen	**#18 Briggs Cunningham**	#5 Jim Kimberly	#66 Richard Perrin	#132 William B. Lloyd	#12 Fred Allen	#110 Frederick W. Procter, Jr.	#137 James S. P. Robinson	#118 Rees T. Makins	#107 Robert W. Magenheimer	#127 Robert T. Keller	#198 Briggs Cunningham	Results
11	Watkins Glen	**(United States) Phil Walters**	(United States) Jim Kimberly	(United States) Richard Perrin	(United States) Bill Lloyd	(United States) Roy Jackson-Moore	(United States) Fred Proctor	(United States) Jim Robinson	(United States) Frank Bott	(United States) Robert Magenheimer	(United States) Robert T. Keller	(United States) Marshall Lewis	Results
12	March	#104 Mabee Chrysler Special	**#4 Ferrari**	#83 Jaguar	#71 Ferrari	no entries	#200 Triumph	#183 Triumph	#91 O.S.C.A.	#118 Porsche	#25 Panhard Special	#31 Moretti	Results
12	March	(United States) Mickey Wysong	**(United States) Bill Spear**	(United States) Jim Peterson	(United States) Howard Hively	no entries	(United States) Walter Kieckhefer	(United States) Lee Owen	(United States) James Simpson	(United States) Jean Pierre Kunstle	(United States) Perry Peron	(United States) John Biehl	Results

^A G Modified were classified with H Modified at Hunter.
^B Modified & Production classes were classified together at Pebble Beach.
^C Separate MG and Porsche winners in F Production were declared at Chanute and Thompson.
^D A separate race for the fastest 10 drivers of the weekend was also held, won by Walt Hansgen in a C Modified-class Jaguar C-Type.

== Champions ==
Class	Driver	Car
B Modified	(United States) Jack Ensley	Kurtis Kraft 500S
C Modified	(United States) Jim Kimberly	Ferrari 375 MM
C Production	(United States) Charles Wallace	Jaguar XK120
D Modified	(United States) Bill Lloyd	Ferrari 225 S, Ferrari 2.7
D Production	(United States) William Kinchloe	Austin-Healey 100
E Modified	(United States) Fred Wacker‡ (United States) Ted Boynton‡	Arnolt-Bristol; Frazer Nash Le Mans
E Production	(United States) Bob Salzgaber	Triumph TR2
F Modified	(United States) Briggs Cunningham	O.S.C.A. MT4
F Production	(United States) Dick Thompson‡ (United States) Art Bunker‡	Porsche 356, MG TD; Porsche 356 Super Coupe, Roadster
G Modified	(United States) Rees Makins	O.S.C.A. MT4
H Modified	(United States) Candy Poole	PBX Special

‡Tie
