= 1955 SCCA National Sports Car Championship =

Seasons
- ← 1954 1956 →

The 1955 SCCA National Sports Car Championship season was the fifth season of the Sports Car Club of America's National Sports Car Championship. It began February 27, 1955, and ended November 13, 1955, after fourteen races.

== Schedule ==
Rnd	Race	Length^{A}	Circuit	Location	Date
1	Florida National Sports Car Races	150 mi (240 km)	Fort Pierce road circuit	Fort Pierce, Florida	February 27
2	Pebble Beach Sports Car Road Race	100 mi (160 km)	Pebble Beach road circuit	Pebble Beach, California	April 17
3	Bakersfield National Sports Car Races	180 km (110 mi)	Minter Field	Bakersfield, California	May 1
4	Cumberland National Sports Car Races	1 hour	Greater Cumberland Regional Airport	Wiley Ford, West Virginia	May 15
5	Beverly National Sports Car Races	100 mi (160 km)	Beverly Airport	Beverly, Massachusetts	July 4
6	National Torrey Pines Sports Car Races	100 mi (160 km)	Camp Callan	San Diego, California	July 10
7	Seafair	?	Kitsap County Airport	Bremerton, Washington	July 31
8	Thompson Races	15 mi (24 km)	Thompson International Speedway	Thompson, Connecticut	September 4
9	Fairfax National Races	50 mi (80 km)	Fairfax Airport	Kansas City, Kansas	September 5
10	Elkhart Lake's Road America Road Race	150 mi (240 km)	Road America	Elkhart Lake, Wisconsin	September 11
11	International Sports Car Grand Prix at Watkins Glen	100 mi (160 km)	Watkins Glen road circuit	Watkins Glen, New York	September 17
12	Fairchild National Sports Car Races	100 mi (160 km)	Fairchild Air Force Base	Hagerstown, Maryland	October 16
13	Sacramento National Sports Car Road Races	100 mi (160 km)	California State Fair Grounds	Sacramento, California	October 30
14	National Grand Central Sports Car Races	100 mi (160 km)	Grand Central Airport	Glendale, California	November 13

^A Feature race

== Season results ==
Feature race overall winners in bold.

Rnd	Circuit	BM Winning Team	CM Winning Team	CP Winning Team	DM Winning Team	DP Winning Team	EM Winning Team	EP Winning Team	FM Winning Team	FP Winning Team	GM Winning Team	GP Winning Team	HM Winning Team	Results
Rnd	Circuit	BM Winning Driver(s)	CM Winning Driver(s)	CP Winning Driver(s)	DM Winning Driver(s)	DP Winning Driver(s)	EM Winning Driver(s)	EP Winning Driver(s)	FM Winning Driver(s)	FP Winning Driver(s)	GM Winning Driver(s)	GP Winning Driver(s)	HM Winning Driver(s)	Results
1	Fort Pierce	#73 Fageol-Porsche	**#30 Ferrari**	#20 Ferrari	#71 Ferrari	#55 Austin-Healey	#7 Frazer Nash	#1 Triumph	#155 Porsche	#39 MG	#189 Siata	no entries	#54 Panhard	Results
1	Fort Pierce	(United States) Lou Fageol	**(United States) Sherwood Johnston**	(United States) Charles Wallace	(United States) Howard Hively	(United States) Duncan Forlong	(United States) Ted Boynton	(United States) Joe Sheppard	(United States) Bob Davis	(United States) Dick Nash	(United States) Howard Hanna	no entries	(United States) Hubert L. Brundage	Results
2	Pebble Beach	Allard	Jaguar	^{A}	**#2 Ferrari**	^{A}	Alfa Romeo	^{A}	#50 Ken Miles	^{A}	Osca	^{A}	Crosley Special	Results
2	Pebble Beach	(United States) Carl Block	(United States) Lou Brero	^{A}	**(United States) Phil Hill**	^{A}	(United States) Charles Rezzaghi	^{A}	(United Kingdom) Ken Miles	^{A}	(United States) I. W. Stephenson	^{A}	(United States) Harry Eyerly	Results
3	Bakersfield	#5 Akton Miller	#25 W. Gussenbauer	#83 Jerry Austin	**#26 Sterling Edwards**	#107 Roy Jackson-Moore	#39 James W. Lowe	#167 Al Newlon	#11 John von Neumann	#135 Springer Jones	#118 Jean P. Kunstle	#32 D.R. Feuerhelm	#172 James A. Orr	Results
3	Bakersfield	(United States) Akton Miller	(United States) Donald Driscoll	(United States) Jerry Austin	**(United States) Sterling Edwards**	(United States) Roy Jackson-Moore	(United States) James Lowe	(United States) Al Newlon	(United States) John von Neumann	(United States) Springer Jones	(United States) Jean Pierre Kunstle	(United States) Duane Feuerhelm	(United States) James Orr	Results
4	Cumberland	no entries	**#197 S. Johnston**	#0 Jack Pry	#10 W.C. Spear	#148 P. O'Shea	#283 Maserati	#260 G. Andrey	#14 G. Lipe	#151 L. Underwood	#25 C.H. Dietrich, Jr.	^{B}	#11 D. Vilardi	Results
4	Cumberland	no entries	**(United States) Sherwood Johnston**	(United States) Charles Wallace	(United States) Bill Spear	(United States) Paul O'Shea	(United States) Fritz Koster	(Switzerland) Gaston Andrey	(United States) Gordon Lipe	(United States) Lake Underwood	(United States) Chuck Dietrich	^{B}	(United States) Dolph Vilardi	Results
5	Beverly	#118 Jaguar-Cadillac Special	#5 Ferrari	#90 Jaguar	**#3 George Tilp**	#99 Austin-Healey	#53 Ferrari	#52 Morgan	#28 Cooper-Porsche	#81 Porsche	#107 Lotus-Climax	#46 MG	#74 PBX	Results
5	Beverly	(United States) John Sinclair	(United States) Jim Kimberly	(United States) Charles Wallace	**(United States) Phil Hill**	(United States) Richard Whitson	(United States) Jim Pauley	(Switzerland) Gaston Andrey	(United States) Gordon Lipe	(United States) Lake Underwood	(United States) Len Bastrup	(United States) George Valentine	(United States) Candy Poole	Results
6	Torrey Pines	#47 Bill Murphy	**#20 Allen Guiberson**	#133 Jerry Austin	#211 John von Neumann	#14 Paul O'Shea	no finishers	no finishers	#124 Pete Lovely	#91 Tracy Bird	#7 Skip Swartley	#132 Duane Feuerhelm	#32 Robert H. Holbrook	Results
6	Torrey Pines	(United States) Bill Murphy	**(United States) Carroll Shelby**	(United States) Jerry Austin	(United States) John von Neumann (United States) Phil Hill	(United States) Paul O'Shea	no finishers	no finishers	(United States) Pete Lovely	(United States) Tracy Bird	(United States) Skip Swartley	(United States) Duane Feuerhelm	(United States) Robert Holbrook	Results
7	Seafair	unknown	**#103 Tony Parravano**	unknown	#3 George Tilp	unknown	Porsche	unknown	Cooper-Porsche	unknown	unknown	unknown	unknown	Results
7	Seafair	unknown	**(United States) Carroll Shelby**	unknown	(United States) Phil Hill	unknown	(United States) John von Neumann	unknown	(United States) Pete Lovely	unknown	unknown	unknown	unknown	Results
8	Thompson^{C}^{D}	#36 Allard-Chrysler	#4 Ferrari	#91 Jaguar #60 Chevrolet	#21 Briggs Cunningham	#70 Mercedes-Benz #84 Austin-Healey	#53 Ferrari	#6 Morgan	#5 Porsche	#89 Porsche	#66 Lotus	#9 MG	#74 PBX	Results
8	Thompson^{C}^{D}	(United States) Stewart Rutherford	(United States) Duncan Black	(United States) Dick Thompson (XKM) (United States) Addison Austin (others)^{E}	(United States) Bill Lloyd	(United States) Art Simmons (overall) (United States) Harold Kunz (AH)^{F}	(United States) Jim Pauley	(Switzerland) Gaston Andrey	(United States) Walt Hansgen	(United States) Emil Pupulidy	(United States) Len Bastrup	(United States) George Valentine	(United States) Candy Poole	Results
9	Fairfax	#51 Allard	**#55 Dayton**	#0 Jaguar	#76 Ferrari	#93 Mercedes-Benz	#32 Maserati	#26 Triumph	#61 Porsche	#14 Porsche	#65 Lotus	#19 MG	#59 Giaur	Results
9	Fairfax	(United States) Walt Gray	**(United States) Dale Duncan**	(United States) Charles Wallace	(United States) David Biggs	(United States) Bud Seaverns	(United States) Tom Friedmann	(United States) Richard McGuire	(United States) Art Bunker	(United States) Bob Ballenger	(United States) Norman Scott	(United States) Roy Heath	(United States) Bill Betts	Results
10	Road America	#57 Walter S. Gray	#60 Briggs Cunningham	#137 Ralph Miller	**#3 George Tilp**	#143 George Tilp	#9 S. H. Arnolt	#300 Bus Gunter	#60 Briggs Cunningham	#14 Bob Ballenger	#177 Rees Makins	#191 Roy Heath	#41 John C. Mays	Results
10	Road America	(United States) Walt Gray	(United States) Sherwood Johnston	(United States) Ralph Miller	**(United States) Phil Hill**	(United States) Paul O'Shea	(United States) S. H. Arnolt	(United States) Bob Goldich	(United States) Frank Bott	(United States) Bob Ballenger	(United States) Rees Makins	(United States) Roy Heath	(United States) John Mays	Results
11	Watkins Glen^{H}	#19 Charles Moran, Jr.	**#60 Briggs Cunningham**	#112 Dr. R.K. Thompson, Jr.	#10 W.C. Spear	#18 George Tilp #109 Frank S. Pohanka, Jr.	#184 William Wonder	#94 Gunnard A. Rubini	#103 William H. Weldon	#89 Emil Pupulidy	#75 Len Bastrup	#218 Henry Willard	#74 Candy Poole	Results
11	Watkins Glen^{H}	(United States) Charles Moran	**(United States) Sherwood Johnston**	(United States) Dick Thompson	(United States) Bill Spear	(United States) Paul O'Shea (MB) (United States) Frank Pohanka (others)^{G}	(United States) William Wonder	(United States) Gunnard Rubini	(United States) Bill Weldon	(United States) Emil Pupulidy	(United States) Len Bastrup	(United States) Henry Willard	(United States) Candy Poole	Results
12	Hagerstown	#29 Allard	**#60 Briggs Cunningham**	#0 Jaguar	#3 Ferrari	#33 Mercedes-Benz #81 Austin-Healey	#58 Briggs Cunningham	#155 Morgan	#69 Porsche	#48 Porsche #177 MG	#19 Lester-MG	#126 Alfa Romeo	#44 Bandini	Results
12	Hagerstown	(United States) Bob Bucher	**(United States) Sherwood Johnston**	(United States) Charles Wallace	(United States) Phil Hill	(United States) Paul O'Shea (overall) (United States) Fred Moore (AH)^{F}	(United States) Briggs Cunningham	(United States) Mike Rothschild	(United States) Ed Crawford	(United States) Lake Underwood (Porsche) (United States) Stephen Spitler (MG)^{I}	(United States) Chuck Dietrich	(United States) Henry Wessells	(United States) Dolph Vilardi	Results
13	Sacramento	#108 Kurtis Kraft	#32 VB Special	#1 Jaguar	**#2 John von Neumann**	#3 Mercedes-Benz	#39 Frazer Nash	#14 Siata	#124 Cooper-Porsche	#35 Porsche	#55 Osca	#147 MG	#50 Crosley Special	Results
13	Sacramento	(United States) Lou Brero	(Mexico) Fred Van Beuren	(United States) Charles Wallace	**(United States) Phil Hill**	(United States) Paul O'Shea	(United States) James Lowe	(United States) Lou Keller	(United States) Pete Lovely	(United States) George Gartung	(United States) Sam Weiss	(United States) John Dair	(United States) Harry Eyerly	Results
14	Glendale^{J}	#21 Bill Murphy	#76 William Doheny	#83 Jim Peterson	**#2 Eleanor von Neumann**	#12 Rudy W. Cleye	#311 Manning J. Post	#59 Ed Savin	#124 Pete Lovely	#86 Dale Johnson	#122 Scuderia Excelsior	#160 Robert E. Brigham	#17 James A. Orr	Results
14	Glendale^{J}	(United States) Bill Murphy	(United States) Ernie McAfee	(United States) Jim Peterson	**(United States) Phil Hill**	(United States) Rudy Cleye	(United States) Richie Ginther	(United States) Bob Oker	(United States) Pete Lovely	(United States) Dale Johnson	(United States) George Buchanan	(United States) Robert Brigham	(United States) James Orr	Results

^A Modified & Production classes were classified together at Pebble Beach
^B G Production were classified with F Production at Cumberland
^C An unrestricted class ran with B Modified, and was won by John Meyer in a Meyer-Cadillac Special.
^D A separate race for the fastest 10 drivers of the weekend was also held, won by John Gordon Bennett in a D Modified-class Maserati 300S.
^E Jaguar XKMs were classified separately from others in C Production at Thompson.
^F Separate Overall and Austin-Healey winners were declared in D Production at Thompson and Hagerstown.
^G Mercedes-Benz 300 SL were classified separately from others in D Production at Watkins Glen.
^H An unrestricted class was also run, and was won by John Plaisted in a Cheetah-Cadillac.
^I Separate Porsche and MG winners were declared in F Production at Hagerstown.
^J An unrestricted class was also run, and was won by Terry Hall in a Talbot Grand Prix car.

== Champions ==
Class	Driver	Car
B Modified	(United States) Charles Moran	Cunningham C4
C Modified	(United States) Sherwood Johnston	Ferrari 375 MM, Jaguar D-Type
C Production	(United States) Charles Wallace	Jaguar XK140 MC, Jaguar XK120
D Modified	(United States) Phil Hill	Ferrari 750 Monza
D Production	(United States) Paul O'Shea	Mercedes-Benz 300 SL
E Modified	(United States) James Lowe	Frazer Nash Le Mans Replica Mk II
E Production	(Switzerland) Gaston Andrey	Morgan Plus 4 Triumph
F Modified	(United States) Pete Lovely	VW-Porsche Special, Cooper-Porsche
F Production	(United States) Bengt Söderström	Porsche 356 Speedster
G Modified	(United States) Skip Swartley	Osca Special
G Production	(United States) George Valentine	MG TC
H Modified	(United States) Dolph Vilardi	Bandini PBV
