= SCCA National Sports Car Championship =

American sports car racing series

The SCCA National Sports Car Championship was a sports car racing series organized by the Sports Car Club of America from 1951 until 1964. It was the first post-World War II sports car series organized in the United States. An amateur championship, it was eventually replaced by the professional United States Road Racing Championship and the amateur American Road Race of Champions, which continues to this day as the SCCA National Championship Runoffs.

== History ==
The championship was created in 1951 from existing SCCA events. Until 1953, a single championship was awarded, with points paid based on finishing position within each class. From 1954, champions were named in each class.

Following the 1962 season, the professional USAC Road Racing Championship collapsed, leaving many competitors looking for a series. The SCCA created the United States Road Racing Championship as a professional series in 1963, moving focus away from the amateur National Championship. In 1965, the SCCA dropped the national championship series and awarded national championships to champions from each region. Top drivers from the regions were invited to the American Road Race of Champions (today known as the National Championship Runoffs) at the end of the season. For 1966, national championships were awarded only to winners at the ARRC, a system which continues today as the Runoffs has become the most prestigious road racing event for club racers.

== Champions ==
=== Overall (1951–1953) ===
Year	Champion
1951	(United States) John Fitch Cunningham, Jaguar
1952	(United States) Sherwood Johnston Jaguar
1953	(United States) Bill Spear Ferrari

=== Modified classes (1954–1964) ===
Year	B Modified	C Modified	D Modified	E Modified	F Modified	G Modified	H Modified	I Modified
1954	(United States) Jack Ensley Kurtis Kraft	(United States) Jim Kimberly Ferrari	(United States) Bill Lloyd Ferrari	(United States) Fred Wacker‡ Bristol	(United States) Briggs Cunningham Osca	(United States) Rees Makins Osca	(United States) Candy Poole PBX Special	–
1954	(United States) Jack Ensley Kurtis Kraft	(United States) Jim Kimberly Ferrari	(United States) Bill Lloyd Ferrari	(United States) Ted Boynton‡ Frazer Nash, Bristol	(United States) Briggs Cunningham Osca	(United States) Rees Makins Osca	(United States) Candy Poole PBX Special	–
1955	(United States) Charles Moran Cunningham	(United States) Sherwood Johnston Ferrari, Jaguar	(United States) Phil Hill Ferrari	(United States) James Lowe Frazer Nash, Bristol	(United States) Pete Lovely Cooper	(United States) Skip Swartley Osca	(United States) Dolph Vilardi Bandini	–
1956	(United States) Walt Gray Allard	(United States) Walt Hansgen Jaguar	(United States) Bill Lloyd Maserati	(United States) E. B. Lunken Ferrari	(United States) Jack McAfee Porsche	(United States) Frank Baptista Lotus	(United States) James Orr Devin Panhard	–
1957	(United States) J. E. Rose Chevrolet	(United States) Walt Hansgen Jaguar	(United States) Paul O'Shea Mercedes-Benz	(Switzerland) Gaston Andrey Ferrari	(United States) Charles Wallace Porsche	(United States) Frank Baptista Lotus	(United States) Melvin Sachs Bandini	–
1958	(United States) Hal Ullrich Excalibur	(United States) Walt Hansgen Lister	(United States) James Johnston Ferrari	(Switzerland) Gaston Andrey Ferrari	(United States) Bob Holbert Porsche	(United States) Frank Baptista Elva, Lotus	(United States) Martin Tanner "Martin T" Special	(United States) Sam Moses Berkeley
1959	(United States) John Staver Echidna	(United States) Dick Thompson Lister, Chevrolet	(United States) Alan Connell Ferrari, Maserati	(Switzerland) Gaston Andrey Ferrari	(United States) Don Sesslar Porsche	(United States) Art Tweedale Elva	(United States) James Eichenlaub Osca	–
1960	(United States) Augie Pabst Scarab	(United States) Dick Thompson Chevrolet	(Switzerland) Gaston Andrey Maserati	(United States) Bob Holbert Porsche	(United States) Roger Penske Porsche	(United States) Millard Ripley Lola, Lotus	(United States) Oliver Schmidt Osca	(United States) Phillips Jeffrey Berkeley
1961	(United States) Harry Heuer Scarab	(United States) Pete Harrison Lister	(United States) Roger Penske Maserati, Cooper	(United States) Bob Holbert Porsche	(United States) Bob Bucher Porsche	(United States) Charles Kurtz Lola	(United States) Oliver Schmidt Lola, Osca	(United States) Phillips Jeffrey Berkeley
1962	–	(United States) Harry Heuer Chaparral, Scarab	(United States) Roger Penske Maserati, Cooper	(United States) Bob Holbert Porsche	(United States) Joe Buzzetta Porsche	(United States) M. R. J. Wyllie Lola	(United States) Glenn Baldwin Lotus	–
1963	–	(United States) Harry Heuer Chaparral	(United States) Roger Penske Cooper	(United States) Joe Buzzetta Porsche	(United States) Peter Sachs Lotus	(United States) Chuck Dietrich Bobsy	(United States) Bill Greer DKW	–
1964	–	(United States) Ed Lowther Genie	(United States) Tom O'Brien Ferrari	(United States) Lee Hall Elva	(United States) Don Wolf Elva	(United States) Charles Barns Merlyn	(United States) Ed Walsh Lotus	–

=== Production classes (1954–1965) ===
Year	A Production	B Production	C Production	D Production	E Production	F Production	G Production	H Production	I Production	J Production
1954	–	–	(United States) Charles Wallace Jaguar	(United States) William Kinchloe Austin-Healey	(United States) Bob Salzgaber Triumph	(United States) Dick Thompson‡ Porsche, MG	–	–	–	–
1954	–	–	(United States) Charles Wallace Jaguar	(United States) William Kinchloe Austin-Healey	(United States) Bob Salzgaber Triumph	(United States) Art Bunker‡ Porsche	–	–	–	–
1955	–	–	(United States) Charles Wallace Jaguar	(United States) Paul O'Shea Mercedes-Benz	(Switzerland) Gaston Andrey Morgan	(United States) Bengt Söderström Porsche	(United States) George Valentine MG	–	–	–
1956	–	–	(United States) Harry Carter Jaguar	(United States) Paul O'Shea Mercedes-Benz	(United States) Bengt Söderström Porsche	(United States) Lake Underwood Porsche	(United States) Emil Pupulidy Porsche	–	–	–
1957	–	(United States) Dick Thompson Chevrolet	(United States) Harry Carter Mercedes-Benz	(United States) Fred Moore Austin-Healey	(United States) Bob Kuhn AC	(United States) Lake Underwood Porsche	(United States) Templeton Briggs Alfa Romeo	–	–	–
1958	–	(United States) Jim Jeffords Chevrolet	(United States) George Reed Ferrari	(United States) Dick Thompson Austin-Healey	(United States) Harry Carter AC	(United States) Emil Pupulidy Porsche	(United States) Bob Grossman Alfa Romeo	(United States) Howard Hanna D.B. Panhard	–	–
1959	–	(United States) Jim Jeffords Chevrolet	(United States) Bob Grossman Ferrari	(United States) Fred Spross Austin-Healey	(United States) Pierre Mion AC	(United States) Harry Blanchard Porsche	(United States) Chuck Stoddard Alfa Romeo	(United States) Ray Heppenstall D.B. Panhard	(United States) Paul Richards Fiat-Abarth	(United States) Ed Wright Berkeley
1960	–	(United States) Bob Johnson Chevrolet	(United States) Bruce Jennings Porsche	(United States) Elliott Pew AC	(United States) Duncan Black Daimler	(United States) Douglas Diffenderfer Siata	(United States) Vince Tamburo Sunbeam	(United States) Chandler Lawrence Fiat-Abarth	–	–
1961	(United States) Bob Hathaway Ferrari	(United States) Dick Thompson Chevrolet	(United States) Pierre Mion AC	(United States) Chuck Stoddard Alfa Romeo	(United States) Mark Donohue Elva	(United States) Howard Hanna D.B. Panhard	(United States) Al Weaver Alfa Romeo	(United States) Rod Harmon Austin-Healey	–	–
1962	(United States) Dick Thompson Chevrolet	(United States) Don Yenko Chevrolet	(United States) Dave Clark Lotus	(United States) Bert Everett Porsche	(United States) Bob Tullius Triumph	(United States) Howard Hanna D.B.	(United States) Lynn Blanchard Alfa Romeo	(United States) Ed Astri Fiat-Abarth	–	–
1963	(United States) Bob Johnson Ford	(United States) Don Yenko Chevrolet	(United States) Duncan Black Daimler	(United States) Bob Tullius Triumph	(United States) Lake Underwood Porsche	(United States) Robert Shaw Alfa Romeo	(United States) Pete Van der Vate Austin-Healey	(United States) Donna Mae Mims Austin-Healey	–	–
1964	(United States) Bob Johnson Ford	(United States) Frank Dominianni Chevrolet	(United States) Bruce Jennings Porsche	(United States) Bob Tullius Triumph	(United States) Hans Zereis Porsche	(United States) Don Sesslar Sunbeam	(United States) Pete Van der Vate Morgan	(United States) Carl Truitt Austin-Healey	–	–
1965	Ford	Jerry Titus Ford								

‡Tie
