= 1964 SCCA National Sports Car Championship =

Seasons
- ← 1963 none →

The 1964 SCCA National Sports Car Championship season was the fourteenth and final season of the Sports Car Club of America's National Sports Car Championship. It began April 12, 1964, and ended October 31, 1964, after eleven races.

== Schedule ==
Rnd	Race	Length^{A}	Circuit	Location	Date
1	SCCA National Race	45 minutes	Marlboro Motor Raceway	Upper Marlboro, Maryland	April 12
2	National Championship Sports Car Races	58 mi (93 km)	Virginia International Raceway	Danville, Virginia	April 19
3	Cumberland National Championship Sports Car Races	?	Greater Cumberland Regional Airport	Wiley Ford, West Virginia	May 17
4	SCCA National Race	?	Bridgehampton Race Circuit	Bridgehampton, New York	May 31
5	SCCA National Race	155 km (96 mi)	Mid-Ohio Sports Car Course	Lexington, Ohio	June 14
6	June Sprints	160 mi (260 km)	Road America	Elkhart Lake, Wisconsin	June 21
7	Lake Garnett Grand Prix	?	Lake Garnett Circuit	Garnett, Kansas	July 5
8	SCCA National Race	100 km (62 mi)	Lynndale Farms Road Racing Course	Pewaukee, Wisconsin	August 2
9	The Glen 500	500 mi (800 km)	Watkins Glen International	Watkins Glen, New York	August 23
10	SCCA National Race	?	Thompson International Speedway	Thompson, Connecticut	September 7
11	SCCA National Race	100 km (62 mi)	Lime Rock Park	Lakeville, Connecticut	October 31
NC^{B}	Sports Car Graphic presents the American Road Race of Champions	45 minutes	Riverside International Raceway	Riverside, California	November 14–15

^A Feature race
^B Non-championship event

== Season results ==
Feature race overall winners in bold.

Rnd	Circuit	AP Winning Team	BP Winning Team	CM Winning Team	CP Winning Team	DM Winning Team	DP Winning Team	EM Winning Team	EP Winning Team	FM Winning Team	FP Winning Team	GM Winning Team	GP Winning Team	HM Winning Team	HP Winning Team	Results
Rnd	Circuit	AP Winning Driver(s)	BP Winning Driver(s)	CM Winning Driver(s)	CP Winning Driver(s)	DM Winning Driver(s)	DP Winning Driver(s)	EM Winning Driver(s)	EP Winning Driver(s)	FM Winning Driver(s)	FP Winning Driver(s)	GM Winning Driver(s)	GP Winning Driver(s)	HM Winning Driver(s)	HP Winning Driver(s)	Results
1	Marlboro	Shelby	Chevrolet	**Genie-Ford**	Porsche	Ferrari	Triumph	Elva-Porsche	Porsche	Elva	Lotus	Lola	Triumph	Osca	Austin-Healey	Results
1	Marlboro	(United States) Charlie Hayes	(United States) Robert Mouat	**(United States) Ed Lowther**	(United States) Bruce Jennings	(United States) Tom O'Brien	(United States) Bob Tullius	(United States) Skip Scott	(United States) Hans Zereis	(United States) Dick Young	(United States) Bob Sharp	(United States) Art Tweedale	(United States) Erwin Lorincz	(United States) John Gordon	(United States) Carl Truitt	Results
2	VIR	#41 Roger Penske	#1 Chevrolet	**#7 Genie-Ford**	#77 Porsche	no finishers	#44 Triumph	no entries	#12 Volvo	#3 Lotus	#22 Porsche	#55 Elva	#31 Morgan	#9 Lotus-Saab	#72 Fiat-Abarth	Results
2	VIR	(United States) Mark Donohue	(United States) Don Yenko	**(United States) Ed Lowther**	(United States) Bruce Jennings	no finishers	(United States) Bob Tullius	no entries	(United States) Art Riley	(United States) Mike Goth	(United States) Ron Grable	(United States) Roger Donovan	(United States) Pete van der Vate	(United States) Ed Walsh	(United States) Ron Catalano	Results
3	Cumberland	#33 Bob Johnson	#11 Don Yenko	#79 William Wissel	#6 Dave Clark	**#87 Tom O'Brien**	#44 Robert Tullius	#11 Barbara C. Cole	#77 M.A. Russell	#85 Donald E. Wolf	#23 Brooks Noah	Stuart Northrup	#53 R&S Import Motors	#9 Edward Walsh	#33 Carl Truitt	Results
3	Cumberland	(United States) Bob Johnson	(United States) Don Yenko	(United States) Ed Smith	(United States) Dave Clark	**(United States) Tom O'Brien**	(United States) Bob Tullius	(United States) Skip Scott	(United States) Bruce Jennings	(United States) Don Wolf	(United States) Brooks Noah	(United States) Stuart Northrup	(United States) Marianne Rollo	(United States) Ed Walsh	(United States) Carl Truitt	Results
4	Bridgehampton	Shelby	Chevrolet	#5 Genie-Ford	Lotus	**#87 Ferrari**	Austin-Healey	#7 Robert Bosch	Porsche	#17 Elva-Ford	Sports Car Forum	Lola	Morgan	Lotus-Saab	Austin-Healey	Results
4	Bridgehampton	(United States) Bob Johnson	(United States) Frank Dominianni	(United States) William Wonder	(United States) Dave Clark	**(United States) Tom O'Brien**	(United States) Jim Ladd	(United States) Joe Buzzetta	(United States) Lake Underwood	(United States) Jack Lofland	(United States) Don Sesslar	(United States) M. R. J. Wyllie	(United States) Pete van der Vate	(United States) Ed Walsh	(United States) Carl Truitt	Results
5	Mid-Ohio	Chevrolet	Chevrolet	**Gates Chevrolet**	Lotus	no entries	Triumph	no entries	#37 Porsche	Elva	Sports Car Forum	Elva	Morgan	Lotus-Saab	Austin-Healey	Results
5	Mid-Ohio	(United States) Dick Lang	(United States) Frank Dominianni	**(United States) Bud Gates**	(United States) Dave Clark	no entries	(United States) Bob Tullius	no entries	(United States) Lake Underwood	(United States) Ernie Harris	(United States) Don Sesslar	(United States) Jack Lawrence	(United States) Pete van der Vate	(United States) Ed Walsh	(United States) Paul Petrun	Results
6	Road America	Shelby	Chevrolet	**Cro-Sal**	Porsche	Ferrari	Triumph	Elva-Porsche	Alfa Romeo	Elva	Sports Car Forum	Merlyn-Cosworth	Triumph	Martin T	Austin-Healey	Results
6	Road America	(United States) Bob Johnson	(United States) Don Yenko	**(United States) Ralph Salyer**	(United States) Bruce Jennings	(United States) Dudley Davis	(United States) Jim Spencer	(United States) Lee Hall	(United States) Al Allin	(United States) Don Wolf	(United States) Don Sesslar	(United States) Charles Barns	(United States) Bob Clemens	(United States) Martin Tanner	(United States) Larry Skeels	Results
7	Lake Garnett	#54 Robert Cross	Dave Dooley	**#61 Jack Hinkle**	no finishers	no entries	#13 John Goans, Jr.	no entries	#77 Leonard Janke	no finishers	#74 Don Sesslar	#96 Charles Barns	#4 Tommy Allen	#9 Ed Walsh	#56 Richard Alley	Results
7	Lake Garnett	(United States) Bob Cross	(United States) Dave Dooley	**(United States) Jack Hinkle**	no finishers	no entries	(United States) John Goans	no entries	(United States) Leonard Janke	no finishers	(United States) Don Sesslar	(United States) Charles Barns	(United States) Tommy Allen	(United States) Ed Walsh	(United States) Richard Alley	Results
8	Lynndale Farms	Shelby	no entries	**Cro-Sal**	Lotus	Ferrari	Triumph	Elva-Porsche	Porsche	Elva	Lotus	Merlyn-Cosworth	Porsche	Lotus-Saab	Austin-Healey	Results
8	Lynndale Farms	(United States) Bob Johnson	no entries	**(United States) Ralph Salyer**	(United States) Dudley Davis	(United States) Dudley Davis	(United States) Jim Spencer	(United States) Lee Hall	(United States) Jerry Frydenlund	(United States) Don Wolf	(United States) Brooks Noah	(United States) Charles Barns	(United States) Evan Morell	(United States) Ed Walsh	(United States) Larry Skeels	Results
9	Watkins Glen	**#10 Harold S. Johnston, Jr.**	#69 Frank J. Dominianni	#17 Ed Lowther	no finishers	no entries	#59 Krueger Tuned Racing Team	#27 Brad Parker	#17 Hans Zereis	#37 High Performance Cars	#74 Sports Car Forum	#76 Motor Sport Service	#13 Patricia Mernone	#19 John S. Gordon	#6 Fred A. Ingham, Jr.	Results
9	Watkins Glen	**(United States) Ed Lowther** **(United States) Bob Nagel**	(United States) Frank Dominianni (United States) Bob Grossman	(United States) Ed Lowther	no finishers	no entries	(United States) Dave Martin (United States) Ernie Donnan	(United States) Charlie Hayes	(United States) Hans Zereis	(United States) Peter Sachs	(United States) Don Sesslar	(United States) Jack Lawrence	(United States) Pete van der Vate	(United States) John Gordon	(United States) Fred Ingham	Results
10	Thompson	Shelby	Chevrolet	Lotus-Porsche	Porsche	no finishers	Austin-Healey	no finishers	Porsche	**Brabham-Ford**	Triumph	Lotus	Datsun	Bosca	Austin-Healey	Results
10	Thompson	(United States) Harold Keck	(United States) Frank Dominianni	(United States) Skip Barber	(United States) Bruce Jennings	no finishers	(United States) Jim Ladd	no finishers	(United States) Lake Underwood	**(United States) Peter Sachs**	(United States) Bob Tullius	(United States) Charles Gibson	(United States) Bob Sharp	(United States) John Igleheart	(United States) Carl Truitt	Results
11	Lime Rock	Chevrolet	Chevrolet	Ferrari	Porsche	**Ferrari**	Triumph	no finishers	Porsche	Brabham-Ford	Sunbeam	Lotus	Triumph	Osca	Austin-Healey	Results
11	Lime Rock	(United States) Ken Hall	(United States) Bob Brull	(United States) Bob Grossman	(United States) Bruce Jennings	**(United States) Tom O'Brien**	(United States) Chris Noyes	no finishers	(United States) Hans Zereis	(United States) Peter Sachs	(United States) William Kneeland	(United States) Charles Gibson	(United States) Dick Gilmartin	(United States) John Gordon	(United Kingdom) Gil Page	Results
NC	Riverside	#61 Shelby American	#61 Kjell Qvale	#61 Grizzly Engineering	#63 Earl T. Jones	#66 Jerry Titus	#11 Robert C. Tullius	#61 Ralph S. Wood	#62 Scientific Automotive	Rick Muther	#33 Richard J. Hull	#51 Charles A. Barns	#61 Ed Barker	#66 Dan Parkinson	#31 Fredrick W. Salo	Results
NC	Riverside	(United States) Ed Leslie	(United States) Merle Brennan	(United States) Bart Martin	(United States) Earl Jones	(United States) Jerry Titus	(United States) Bob Tullius	(United States) Ralph Wood	(United States) Alan Johnson	(United States) Rick Muther	(United States) Dick Hull	(United States) Charles Barns	(United States) Ed Barker	(United States) Dan Parkinson	(United States) Fred Salo	Results

== Champions ==
Class	Driver	Car
A Production	(United States) Bob Johnson	Shelby Cobra 289
B Production	(United States) Frank Dominianni	Chevrolet Corvette
C Modified	(United States) Ed Lowther	Genie Mk.8-Ford
C Production	(United States) Bruce Jennings	Porsche 356 Carrera
D Modified	(United States) Tom O'Brien	Ferrari Dino 268 SP
D Production	(United States) Bob Tullius	Triumph TR4
E Modified	(United States) Lee Hall	Elva Mark VII Porsche
E Production	(United States) Hans Zereis	Porsche 356 Speedster
F Modified	(United States) Don Wolf	Elva Mark VII
F Production	(United States) Don Sesslar	Sunbeam Alpine
G Modified	(United States) Charles Barns	Merlyn Mk. VI-Cosworth
G Production	(United States) Pete van der Vate	Morgan 4/4 Mk IV
H Modified	(United States) Ed Walsh	Lotus 23-Saab, Lotus Seven A-Saab
H Production	(United States) Carl Truitt	Austin-Healey Sprite
