= Northeast Grand Prix =

IMSA SportsCar Championship
- Venue: Lime Rock Park
- First race: 1958
- Last race: 2023
- Duration: 2 hours 40 minutes
- Previous names: Lime Rock Nationals, Camel GTO/GTU Grand Prix, Jamesway 300, New England Grand Prix
- Most wins (driver): Klaus Graf (3)
- Most wins (team): Muscle Milk Pickett Racing (3)
- Most wins (manufacturer): Audi (4)

The Northeast Grand Prix (until 2006: New England Grand Prix) was a professional sports car race held at Lime Rock Park in Lakeville, Connecticut, United States as part of the IMSA SportsCar Championship. Previous editions of the Grand Prix belonged to the SCCA National Sports Car Championship, the IMSA GT Championship and the American Le Mans Series. The race currently has a duration of 2 hours and 40 minutes and takes place in July, previously having been held on Independence Day weekend compared to the Lime Rock Grand Prix that was held on Memorial Day weekend. The race was removed from the IMSA SportsCar Championship in 2024, however it will return in 2027 as part of the Michelin Pilot Challenge.

== Winners ==
Year	Date	Overall winner(s)	Entrant	Car	Distance/Duration	Race title	Report
SCCA National Sports Car Championship
1958	July 5	(United States) Ed Crawford	(United States) Briggs Cunningham	Lister-Jaguar	50 miles (80 km)	Lime Rock National Championship Races	report
1959	July 4	(United States) George Constantine	(United States) Elisha Walker	Aston Martin DBR2	50 miles (80 km)	Lime Rock National Championship Races	report
1960	July 2	(United States) George Constantine	(United States) Kelso Auto Dynamics	Lister-Chevrolet	?	SCCA National Races	report
1961	July 1	(United States) Roger Penske		Maserati Tipo 61	45 miles (72 km)	Lime Rock National Races	report
1962	June 30	(United States) Roger Penske		Cooper Monaco	28 miles (45 km)	Lime Rock Nationals	report
1963	June 15	(United States) Peter Sachs		Lotus 23	60 miles (97 km)	Lime Rock Nationals	report
1964	October 31	(United States) Tom O'Brien		Ferrari Dino 268 SP	60 miles (97 km)	Lime Rock Nationals	report
1965 —1985	Not held						
IMSA GT Championship (GT classes only)
1986	September 1	(United States) Jack Baldwin	(United States) Peerless/Hendrick	Chevrolet Camaro	2 Hours	Camel GTO/GTU Grand Prix	report
1987	September 7	(United States) Bob Earl	(United States) Dingman Bros Racing	Pontiac Fiero	230 mi (370 km)	Camel GTO/GTU Grand Prix	report
1988	September 5	(United States) Wally Dallenbach Jr.	(United States) Protofab Racing	Chevrolet Corvette	138 mi (222 km)	Camel GTO/GTU Grand Prix	report
1989	October 1	(West Germany) Hans-Joachim Stuck	(United States) Audi of America	Audi 90 quattro	2 Hours	Camel GTO/GTU Grand Prix	report
1990	September 29	(United States) Robby Gordon	(United States) Whistler Radar	Mercury Cougar XR-7	2 Hours	Jamesway 300	report
1991	September 28	(New Zealand) Steve Millen	(United States) Cunningham Racing	Nissan 300ZX	2 Hours	Jamesway 300	report
1992	September 26	(New Zealand) Steve Millen	(United States) Cunningham Racing	Nissan 300ZX	1 Hour, 45 Minutes	Jamesway 300	report
1993 —2003	Not held						
American Le Mans Series
2004	July 5	(Finland) JJ Lehto (Germany) Marco Werner	(United States) ADT Champion Racing	Audi R8	2 hours, 45 minutes	New England Grand Prix	report
2005	July 4	(Finland) JJ Lehto (Germany) Marco Werner	(United States) ADT Champion Racing	Audi R8	2 hours, 45 minutes	New England Grand Prix	report
2006	July 1	(Italy) Rinaldo Capello (United Kingdom) Allan McNish	(United States) Audi Sport North America	Audi R8	2 hours, 45 minutes	New England Grand Prix	report
2007	July 7	(Germany) Sascha Maassen (Australia) Ryan Briscoe	(United States) Penske Racing	Porsche RS Spyder	2 hours, 45 minutes	Northeast Grand Prix	report
2008	July 12	(United States) Scott Sharp (Australia) David Brabham	(United States) Patrón Highcroft Racing	Acura ARX-01b	2 hours, 45 minutes	Northeast Grand Prix	report
2009	July 18	(Brazil) Gil de Ferran (France) Simon Pagenaud	(United States) de Ferran Motorsports	Acura ARX-02a	2 hours, 45 minutes	Northeast Grand Prix	report
2010	July 24	(United States) Greg Pickett (Germany) Klaus Graf	(United States) Muscle Milk Team Cytosport	Porsche RS Spyder Evo	2 hours, 45 minutes	Northeast Grand Prix	report
2011	July 9	(United States) Chris Dyson (United Kingdom) Guy Smith	(United States) Dyson Racing Team	Lola B09/86	2 hours, 45 minutes	Northeast Grand Prix	report
2012	July 7	(Germany) Lucas Luhr (Germany) Klaus Graf	(United States) Muscle Milk Pickett Racing	HPD ARX-03a	2 hours, 45 minutes	Northeast Grand Prix	report
2013	July 6	(Germany) Lucas Luhr (Germany) Klaus Graf	(United States) Muscle Milk Pickett Racing	HPD ARX-03a	2 hours, 45 minutes	Northeast Grand Prix	report
2014	Not held						
IMSA SportsCar Championship
2015	July 25	(United States) Mike Guasch (United Kingdom) Tom Kimber-Smith	(United States) PR1/Mathiasen Motorsports	Oreca FLM09	2 hours 40 minutes	Northeast Grand Prix	report
2016	July 23	(Venezuela) Alex Popow (Netherlands) Renger van der Zande	(United States) Starworks Motorsport	Oreca FLM09	2 hours 40 minutes	Northeast Grand Prix	report
2017	July 22	(France) Patrick Pilet (Germany) Dirk Werner	(United States) Porsche GT Team	Porsche 911 RSR	2 hours 40 minutes	Northeast Grand Prix	report
2018	July 21	(United States) Joey Hand (Germany) Dirk Müller	(United States) Ford Chip Ganassi Racing	Ford GT	2 hours 40 minutes	Northeast Grand Prix	report
2019	July 20	(Australia) Ryan Briscoe (United Kingdom) Richard Westbrook	(United States) Ford Chip Ganassi Racing	Ford GT	2 hours 40 minutes	Northeast Grand Prix	report
2020	Moved to Charlotte - COVID-19 pandemic						
2021	July 17	(Spain) Antonio García (United States) Jordan Taylor	(United States) Corvette Racing	Chevrolet Corvette C8.R	2 hours 40 minutes	Northeast Grand Prix	report
2022	July 16	(Australia) Matt Campbell (France) Mathieu Jaminet	(Canada) Pfaff Motorsports	Porsche 911 GT3 R	2 hours 40 minutes	FCP Euro Northeast Grand Prix	report
2023	July 22	(United Kingdom) Ross Gunn (Spain) Alex Riberas	(United States) Heart of Racing Team	Aston Martin Vantage AMR GT3	2 hours 40 minutes	FCP Euro Northeast Grand Prix	report
