= 1956 SCCA National Sports Car Championship =

Seasons
- ← 1955 1957 →

The 1956 SCCA National Sports Car Championship season was the sixth season of the Sports Car Club of America's National Sports Car Championship. It began March 10, 1956, and ended November 4, 1956, after eleven races.

== Schedule ==
Rnd	Race	Length^{A}	Circuit	Location	Date
1	Walterboro National Championship Sports Car Races	105 mi (169 km)	Lowcountry Regional Airport	Walterboro, South Carolina	March 10
2	Pebble Beach Sports Car Road Race	100 mi (160 km)	Pebble Beach road circuit	Pebble Beach, California	April 22
3	Cumberland National Sports Car Races	1 hour	Greater Cumberland Regional Airport	Wiley Ford, West Virginia	May 20
4	Texan National Championship Sports Car Races	100 mi (160 km)	Eagle Mountain National Guard Base	Fort Worth, Texas	June 3
5	National Road Races	150 mi (240 km)	Road America	Elkhart Lake, Wisconsin	June 24
6	Beverly National Sports Car Races	90 mi (140 km)	Beverly Airport	Beverly, Massachusetts	July 7
7	Seafair National Championship Races	200 km (120 mi)	Kitsap County Airport	Bremerton, Washington	August 12
8	Thompson National Championship Races	1 hour	Thompson International Speedway	Thompson, Connecticut	September 3
9	National Championship Road America Endurance Races	6 hours	Road America	Elkhart Lake, Wisconsin	September 9
10	International Sports Car Grand Prix of Watkins Glen	50 mi (80 km)	Watkins Glen International	Watkins Glen, New York	September 15
11	Palm Springs National Championship Road Races	100 mi (160 km)	Palm Springs Municipal Airport	Palm Springs, California	November 4

^A Feature race

== Season results ==
Feature race overall winners in bold.

Rnd	Circuit	BM Winning Team	CM Winning Team	CP Winning Team	DM Winning Team	DP Winning Team	EM Winning Team	EP Winning Team	FM Winning Team	FP Winning Team	GM Winning Team	GP Winning Team	HM Winning Team	Results
Rnd	Circuit	BM Winning Driver(s)	CM Winning Driver(s)	CP Winning Driver(s)	DM Winning Driver(s)	DP Winning Driver(s)	EM Winning Driver(s)	EP Winning Driver(s)	FM Winning Driver(s)	FP Winning Driver(s)	GM Winning Driver(s)	GP Winning Driver(s)	HM Winning Driver(s)	Results
1	Walterboro	#18 Cunningham	**#59 Briggs Cunningham**	#22 Jaguar	#44 Ferrari	#0 Mercedes-Benz	no entries	#9 Arnolt-Bristol	#47 Porsche	#36 Porsche	#35 Lotus	#40 MG	#90 Crosley	Results
1	Walterboro	(United States) Fred Wacker	**(United States) Sherwood Johnston**	(United States) Richard Kessler	(United States) Gene Greenspun	(United States) Charles Wallace	no entries	(United States) S. H. Arnolt	(United States) Mike Marshall	(United States) Lake Underwood	(United States) Frank Baptista	(United States) Ralph Durbin	(United States) Ed Welch	Results
2	Pebble Beach	#108 Kurtis-Cadillac	#2 John von Neumann	#46 Chevrolet	**#24 Dick Hall**	#136 Mercedes-Benz	#38 Frazer Nash	#59 Morgan	#188 Porsche	#86 Porsche	#6 Cooper-Climax	#33 MG	#154 Crosley Special	Results
2	Pebble Beach	(United States) Lou Brero	(United States) Phil Hill	(United States) Dick Thompson	**(United States) Carroll Shelby**	(United States) Tony Settember	(United States) Marion Lowe	(United States) Bob Oker	(United States) Jack McAfee	(United States) Dale Johnson	(United States) John Fox	(United States) Gordon Wilson	(United States) Harry Eyerly	Results
3	Cumberland	#29 Allard-Cadillac	**#206 Tage Hansgen**	#180 Jaguar	#30 Maserati	#233 Mercedes-Benz #170 Austin-Healey^{A}	#6 Ferrari	#181 A.C.-Bristol	#80 Porsche	#209 Porsche	#2 Lotus	#88 Porsche	#249 D.B.	Results
3	Cumberland	(United States) Bob Bucher	**(United States) Walt Hansgen**	(United States) Harry Carter	(United States) Bill Lloyd	(United States) Paul O'Shea (MB) (United States) Fred Moore (AH)	(United States) Charles Hassan	(United States) John B. Mull	(United States) Jack McAfee	(United States) Lake Underwood	(United States) M. R. J. Wyllie	(United States) Emil Pupulidy	(United States) Howard Hanna	Results
4	Eagle Mountain	#16 Allard-Lincoln	#58 Ferrari	#18 Chevrolet	**#110 Richard Hall**	#35 Mercedes-Benz	#83 Siata	#26 Porsche	#78 Porsche	#45 Porsche	#171 Lotus	#66 Alfa Romeo	#76 Giaur	Results
4	Eagle Mountain	(United States) Walt Gray	(United States) Sherwood Johnston	(United States) Dick Thompson	**(United States) Carroll Shelby**	(United States) Paul O'Shea	(United States) T. D. Johnson	(United States) Richard McGuire	(United States) Jack McAfee	(United States) Jerry Morton	(United States) Ralph Miller	(United States) Val Scroggie	(United States) Bill Betts	Results
5	Road America	#51 Allard-Packard	**#111 Ferrari**	#22 Chevrolet	#66 Maserati	#1 Mercedes-Benz	#6 Ferrari	#44 A.C.-Bristol	#188 Porsche	#26 Porsche	#255 Cooper	#178 Alfa Romeo	#41 FiberSport Crosley	Results
5	Road America	(United States) Walt Gray	**(United States) Carroll Shelby**	(United States) Bark Henry	(United States) Phil Stewart	(United States) Charles Wallace	(United States) Ed Lunken	(United States) Ernie Erickson	(United States) Jack McAfee	(United States) Carl Haas	(United States) Fred Sclavi	(United States) Bill Wuesthoff	(United States) John Mays	Results
6	Beverly	#29 Allard-Cadillac	**#144 R. Cherryholme**	#111 Chevrolet	#47 Ferrari	#0 Mercedes-Benz	#6 Ferrari	#177 Porsche	#69 Porsche	#37 Porsche	#35 Lotus	#88 Porsche	#2 Bandini	Results
6	Beverly	(United States) Bob Bucher	**(United States) Carroll Shelby**	(United States) Dick Thompson	(United States) Masten Gregory	(United States) Charles Wallace	(United States) Ed Lunken	(United States) Bengt Söderström	(United States) Ed Crawford	(United States) Lake Underwood	(United States) Frank Baptista	(United States) Emil Pupulidy	(United States) Henry Rudkin	Results
7	Seafair	#108 Kurtis-Cadillac	**#98 John Edgar**	#106 Chevrolet	^{B}	#33 Mercedes-Benz	^{C}	#97 Morgan	#188 Porsche	#9 Porsche	#66 Cooper-Climax	#87 Alfa Romeo	^{D}	Results
7	Seafair	(United States) Lou Brero	**(United States) Carroll Shelby**	(United States) Dick Thompson	^{B}	(United States) Paul O'Shea	^{C}	(United States) Dave Troffer	(United States) Jack McAfee	(United States) LeRoy Caverly	(United States) John Fox	(United States) Paul Naw	^{D}	Results
8	Thompson	no finishers	**#41 Auto Engineering**	#80 Jaguar	^{E}	#111 George Tilp	#7 Temple Buell	#127 A.C.-Bristol	#47 Porsche	#29 Porsche	#44 Lotus	#89 Porsche	#4 PBX	Results
8	Thompson	no finishers	**(United States) Walt Hansgen**	(United States) Harry Carter	^{E}	(United States) Paul O'Shea	(United States) Masten Gregory	(United States) Les Cizek	(United States) Masten Gregory	(United States) John Clapp	(United States) Duncan Black	(United States) Emil Pupulidy	(United States) Dolph Vilardi	Results
9	Road America	#98 Nash-Healey	**#10 John Kilborn**	#36 Jaguar	#65 Aston Martin	#33 Mercedes-Benz	#7 Ted Boynton	#86 A.C.	#5 Osca	#56 Porsche	#23 Cooper	#52 Alfa Romeo	#46 Herman Behm	Results
9	Road America	(United States) Andy Rosenberger (United States) Robert Gary	**(United States) John Kilborn** **(United States) Howard Hively**	(United States) Duke Knowlton (United States) William Andrews	(United States) Rod Carveth (United States) John Barneson	(United States) Paul O'Shea (United States) Phil Hill	(United States) Ted Boynton (United States) Bob Ballenger	(United States) Frank Campbell (United States) Hal Ullrich	(United States) Jim Kimberly (United States) Carroll Shelby	(United States) Chuck Rickert (United States) Donald Kriplen	(United States) Lance Reventlow (United States) Richie Ginther	(United States) Ralph Durbin (United States) K. Askew	(United States) Herman Behm (United States) Carl Haas	Results
10	Watkins Glen	#29 Bob Bucher	**#49 Mary L. Constantine**	#30 Raymond E. Mason	#86 Edward F. Droesch	#10 George Tilp	#75 William M. Wonder	no entries	#146 Austin L. Conley	#58 F. V. Grauds #67 Sherman L. Decker	#2 M. R. J. Wyllie	#44 Victor V. Forno #105 Robert Holbert	#131 Ecruie Broque	Results
10	Watkins Glen	(United States) Bob Bucher	**(United States) George Constantine**	(United States) Raymond Mason	(United States) Ed Droesch	(United States) Paul O'Shea	(United States) William Wonder	no entries	(United States) Austin Conley	(United States) F. Grauds (overall) (United States) Sherman Decker (MG)^{F}	(United States) M. R. J. Wyllie	(United States) Victor Forno (overall) (United States) Bob Holbert (MG)^{F}	(United States) Dick Yares	Results
11	Palm Springs	#84 Hagemann Special-Chrysler	**#98 John Edgar**	#106 Chevrolet	#49 Aston Martin	#35 Mercedes-Benz #277 Austin-Healey	#39 Frazer Nash	#59 A.C.-Bristol	#95 Cooper-Climax	#20 Porsche	#91 Lotus	#181 Alfa Romeo	#7 Devin-Panhard	Results
11	Palm Springs	(United States) John Barneson	**(United States) Carroll Shelby**	(United States) Dick Thompson	(United States) Bob Drake	(United States) Jack Bates (MB) (United States) Elliott Forbes-Robinson (others)^{G}	(United States) James Lowe	(United States) Bob Oker	(United States) Bob Drake	(United States) Don Dickey	(United States) Harvey Mayer	(United States) Richard Morse	(United States) James Orr	Results

^A Separate Mercedes-Benz 300SLs and Austin-Healey 100s winners were declared in D Production at Cumberland. The Mercedes ran in a race with C Production, and the Austin-Healeys in a race with E Production.
^B D, E, and F Modified were classified together at Seafair; the combined class was won by Jack McAfee's FM Porsche 550. The highest-finishing DM car was Jack Graham's Aston Martin DB3S in 2nd.
^C E Modified were classified with D Modified at Seafair.
^D H Modified were classified with E Modified at Seafair.
^E D and E Modified were classified together for the 1-hour races at Thompson. The class was won by Masten Gregory in an EM Ferrari. D Modified was classed with C Modified in the sprint race.
^F Separate Overall and MG winners were declared in F and G Production at Watkins Glen.
^G Mercedes-Benz 300 SLs were classified separately from others in D Production at Palm Springs.

== Champions ==
Class	Driver	Car
B Modified	(United States) Walt Gray	Allard J2-Lincoln, Allard J2-Packard
C Modified	(United States) Walt Hansgen	Jaguar D-Type
C Production	(United States) Harry Carter	Jaguar XK140MC
D Modified	(United States) Bill Lloyd	Maserati 300S
D Production	(United States) Paul O'Shea	Mercedes-Benz 300SL
E Modified	(United States) E. B. Lunken	Ferrari 500 TR
E Production	(United States) Bengt Söderström	Porsche 356 1600
F Modified	(United States) Jack McAfee	Porsche 550 Spyder
F Production	(United States) Lake Underwood	Porsche 356 1500
G Modified	(United States) Frank Baptista	Lotus Mark IX
G Production	(United States) Emil Pupulidy	Porsche 356 1300
H Modified	(United States) James Orr	Devin-Panhard
