= Elva (car manufacturer) =

Elva Engineering Co Ltd
- Elva racing car manufacturer logo
- Type: British Sports and racing car manufacturer
- Industry: Automobiles
- Founded: 1955
- Founder: Frank G. Nichols
- Headquarters: Bexhill-on-Sea, East Sussex, England
- Products: Elva racing cars Elva Courier

Elva was a sports and racing car manufacturing company based in Bexhill, then Hastings and Rye, East Sussex, United Kingdom. The company was founded in 1955 by Frank G. Nichols. The name comes from the French phrase elle va ("she goes").

== Racing cars ==
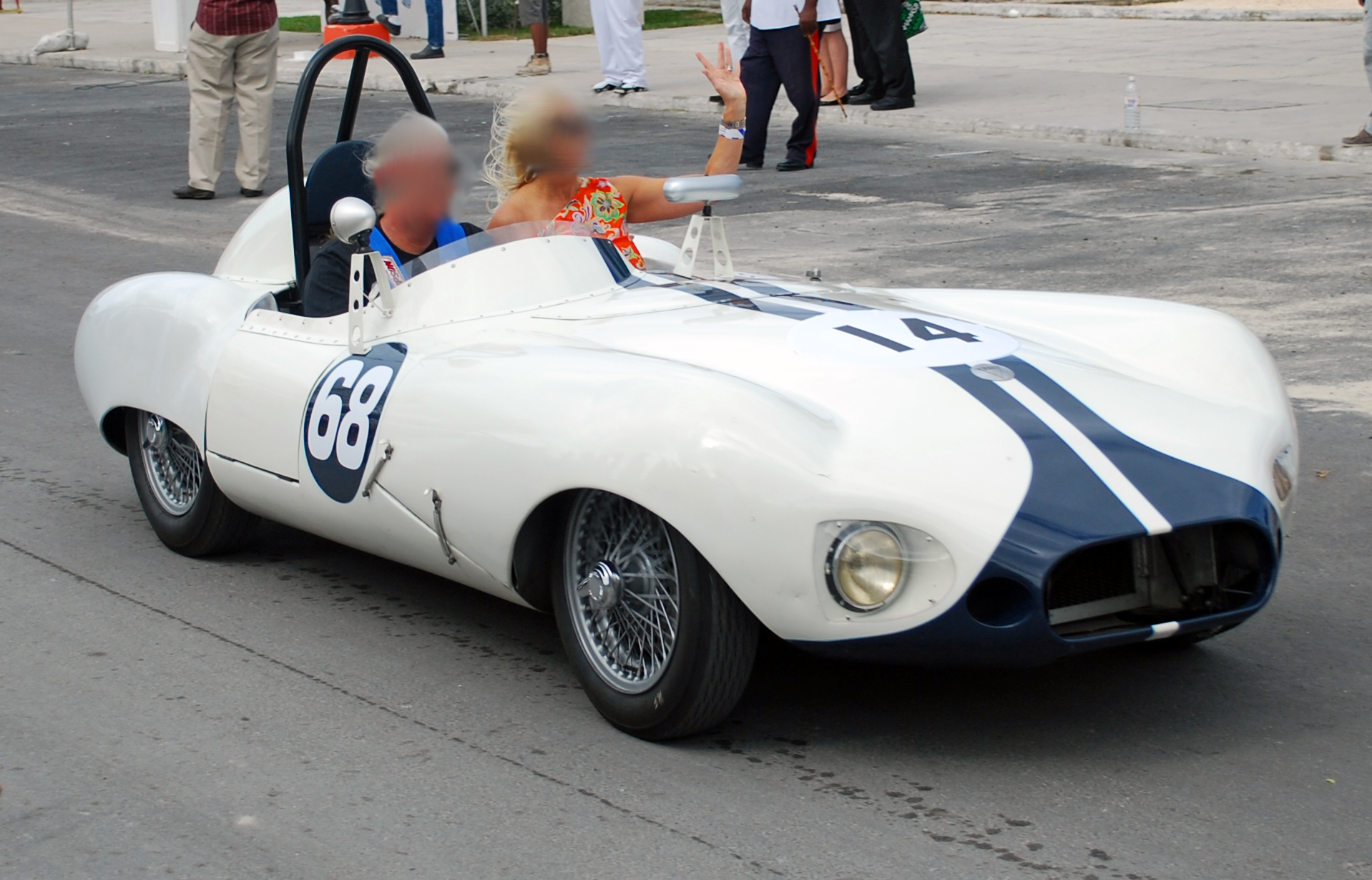
Late Elva Mk IIa (No. 100/49, 1957), a transition model which shares much of the Mk III's design

Frank Nichols's intention was to build a low-cost sports/racing car, and a series of models were produced between 1954 and 1959.

The original model, based on the CSM car built nearby in Hastings by Mike Chapman, used Standard Ten front suspension rather than Ford swing axles, and a Ford Anglia rear axle with an overhead-valve-conversion of a Ford 10 engine. About 25 were made. While awaiting delivery of the CSM, Nichols finished second in a handicap race at Goodwood on 27 March 1954, driving a Lotus. "From racing a Ford-engined CSM sports car in 1954, just for fun but nevertheless with great success, Frank Nichols has become a component manufacturer. The intermediate stage was concerned with the design of a special head, tried in the CSM and the introduction of the Elva car which was raced with success in 1955." The cylinder head for the 1,172 cc Ford engine, devised by Malcolm Witts and Harry Weslake, featured overhead inlet valves.

=== Mk I to III ===
On 22 May 1955 Robbie Mackenzie-Low climbed Prescott in the sports Elva Mk I to set the class record at 51.14 sec. Mackenzie-Low also won the Bodiam Hill Climb outright at the end of the season.

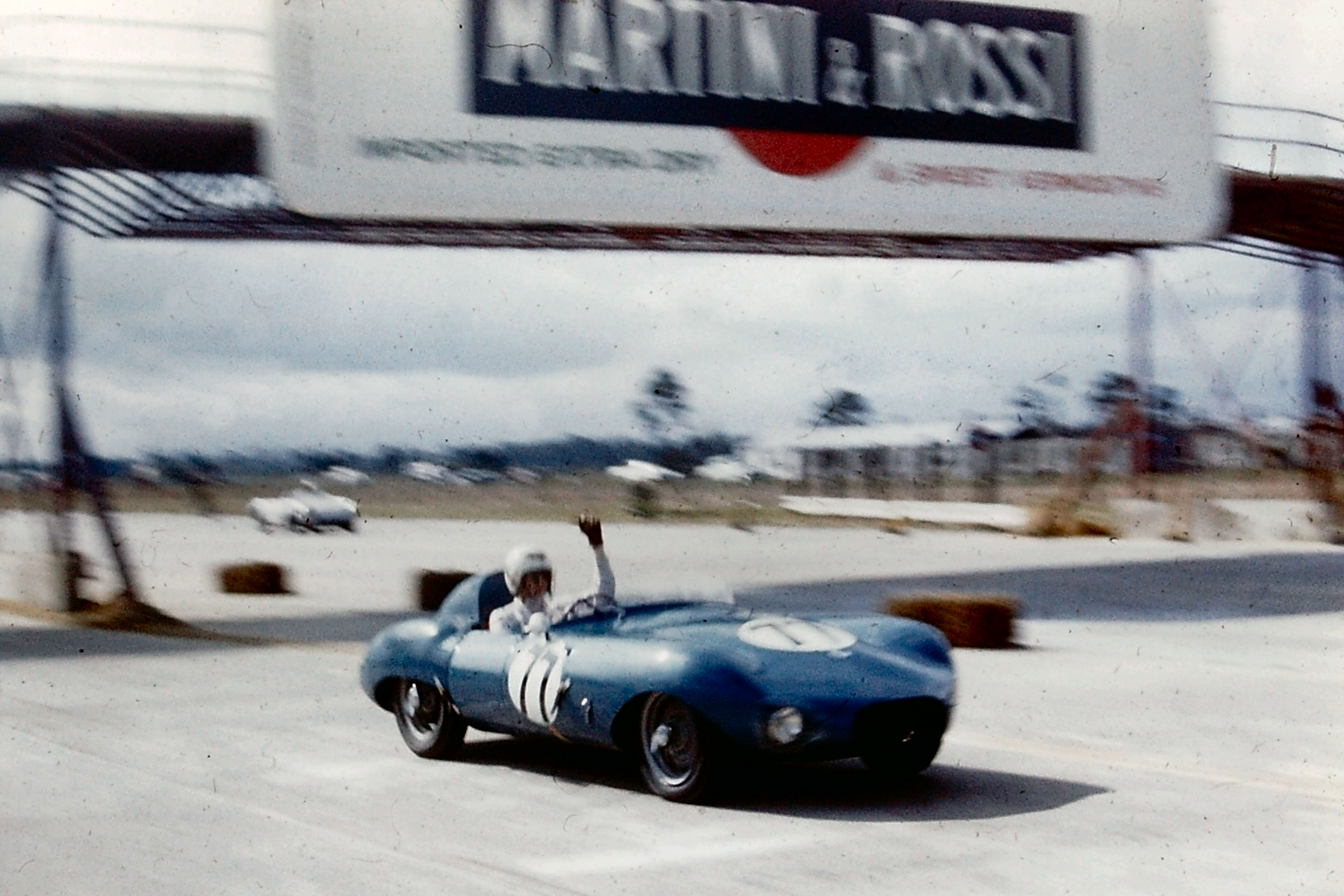
Elva-Climax Mk. III (Sebring 1958)

The 1956 Elva MK II works prototype, registered KDY 68, was fitted with a Falcon all-enveloping fibreglass bodyshell. Nichols developed the Elva Mk II from lessons learnt in racing the prototype: "That car was driven in 1956 races by Archie Scott Brown, Stuart Lewis-Evans and others." The Elva Mk II appeared in 1957: "Main differences from the Mark I are in the use of a De Dion rear axle as on the prototype, but with new location, inboard rear brakes, lengthened wheelbase, and lighter chassis frame."

The Elva cars were offered and raced with the 1,100 cc Coventry-Climax FWA engine as standard but went through various bodywork and suspension changes up to the Mark III of 1958.

=== Mk IV and V ===
Carl Haas, from Chicago, was an Elva agent serving the midwest of the United States from the mid-1950s through the 1960s. Haas was invited to England to drive an Elva Mk III in the Tourist Trophy at Goodwood on 13 September 1958, where he finished twelfth overall. Also in that 23rd Tourist Trophy race was the new Mark IV model driven by Ian Burgess and Robbie Mackenzie-Low. Stuart Lewis-Evans drove the same works car, registered MBW 616, to fastest time of the day at the Bodiam Hill Climb in East Sussex on 11 October 1958. Tragically, Lewis-Evans lost his life just two weeks later through injuries sustained at the Moroccan Grand Prix.

As far as the design of the new Mark IV was concerned, in the words of Carl Haas "The major change is an all-new independent rear suspension utilizing low-pivot swing axles. The body is entirely new with close attention to aerodynamics and a reduced frontal area. It's a big step from the Mk III. Finally, Elva has an 1100cc car potentially better than the Lotus. They've moved a lot of weight off the front wheels by moving the engine back." The Mark IV was also the first Elva with a tubular spaceframe chassis and had an aluminium under tray riveted to the chassis providing rigidity and strength.

At the Sebring 12 Hours sports car race in March 1959 the No. 48 Elva Mark IV driven by Frank Baptista, Art Tweedale and Charley Wallace finished first in Class G, and 19th overall. Another works Mark IV, No. 49 driven by Burdette Martin, Chuck Dietrich and Bill Jordan, took second place in Class G completing an excellent outing for the new 1959 season model.

A week or so later saw the first UK outing in 1959 for the Elva works team. Three Mark IV cars took part in the Chichester Cup at the Goodwood Easter Meeting with Scots racer Tom Dickson starting on the front row alongside three of the new Lola Mk1s. The Lolas dominated the race taking a 1-2-3 but the Elva Mark IV of Les Leston finished a decent 7th with Dickson just behind and John Peters, an American amateur racer, a few places further back in 11th place. Peters later exported his Mark IV to his home in Los Angeles and continued to race the car in Californian events, including attempting to qualify for the 200-mile Los Angeles Times Grand Prix for sports cars held at Riverside International Raceway in late 1959.

At the 11th International Trophy meeting at Silverstone on 2 May 1959 Tom Dickson finished a creditable 3rd in the 1,100cc sports racing event, sandwiched between the works Lola Mk1s in first and second and the Lotus Eleven of Peter Arundell in fourth. A second Mark IV, that of experienced amateur racer Cedric Brierley, came in 5th.

Further success came on 21 June 1959 when Arthur Tweedale and Bob Davis won the Marlboro Six Hour Endurance Race in Maryland driving the No. 37 Elva Mark IV. Art Tweedale repeated the win in the Marlboro Six Hours in 1960. Teamed with Ed Costley he covered 337.75 miles, this time in an Elva Mark V sports car. Introduced mid-way through the 1959 season, the Mark V was the final iteration of the Elva front-engined sports racing car and differed from the Mark IV only through some minor tweaks to the rear suspension and revised bodywork.

Elva sports racers featured again at Goodwood in the 24th Tourist Trophy race held on 5 September 1959. A Mark IV driven by John Brown and Chris Steele finished the race in overall 13th place. However, marque honours were taken by the Mk V driven to 3rd in the 1,100 cc class and 9th overall by Mike McKee and Cedric Brierley.

Although ultimately outclassed by the similarly engined Lola Mk1, the Elva Mark IV and Mark V models were short-lived but relatively successful models in the highly competitive late 1950s 1,100 cc sports/racing class. In the period up to the end of 1960, aside from one notable event detailed below, they were only ever raced in serious events with the modestly-powered but efficient 1,098cc Coventry-Climax FWA engine fitted with SU carburettors. However, their lightweight construction, innovative suspension and good aerodynamics made them serious competition.

The majority of Mark IV and Mark V cars built were exported to the US and raced successfully by both amateur and professional racers alike. One notable occasion saw Burdette Martin's Elva MkIV fitted with a 1,475cc Coventry-Climax FPF F2 engine driven with some success by Ed Crawford in Round 8 of the 1959 USAC Road Racing Championship at Meadowdale. Crawford was a renowned Porsche and Briggs Cunningham pilot and took the Elva Mk IV to an emphatic win, lapping the field in the 1,500 cc qualifying heat against some impressive opposition.

On a slightly less serious note, one of the US-domiciled Mk IV cars ended up featuring in the supporting cast of the Elvis Presley movie 'Viva Las Vegas' although a later Mark VI sports racer played a more prominent role as Elvis' race car.

The last Mk V chassis won a number of important races in the US midwest driven by Dick Buedingen, including the 1961 Elkhart Lake 500 teamed with Carl Haas. At this time Elva Cars Limited was operating from premises at Sedlescombe Road North, Hastings, Sussex, England.

=== Mk VI, VII and VIII/VIIIS ===
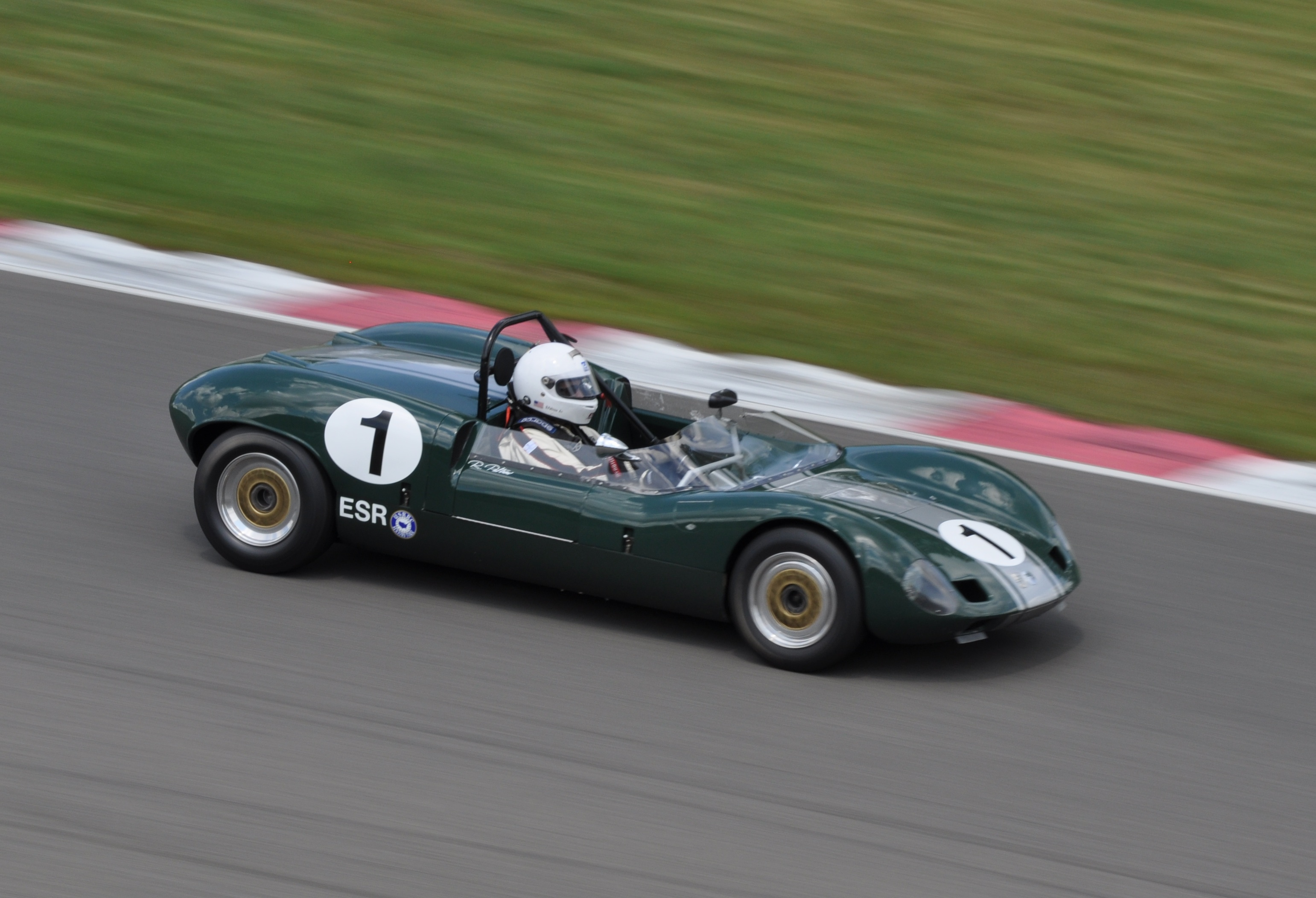
Elva Mk VII S at Circuit Mont-Tremblant in 2010

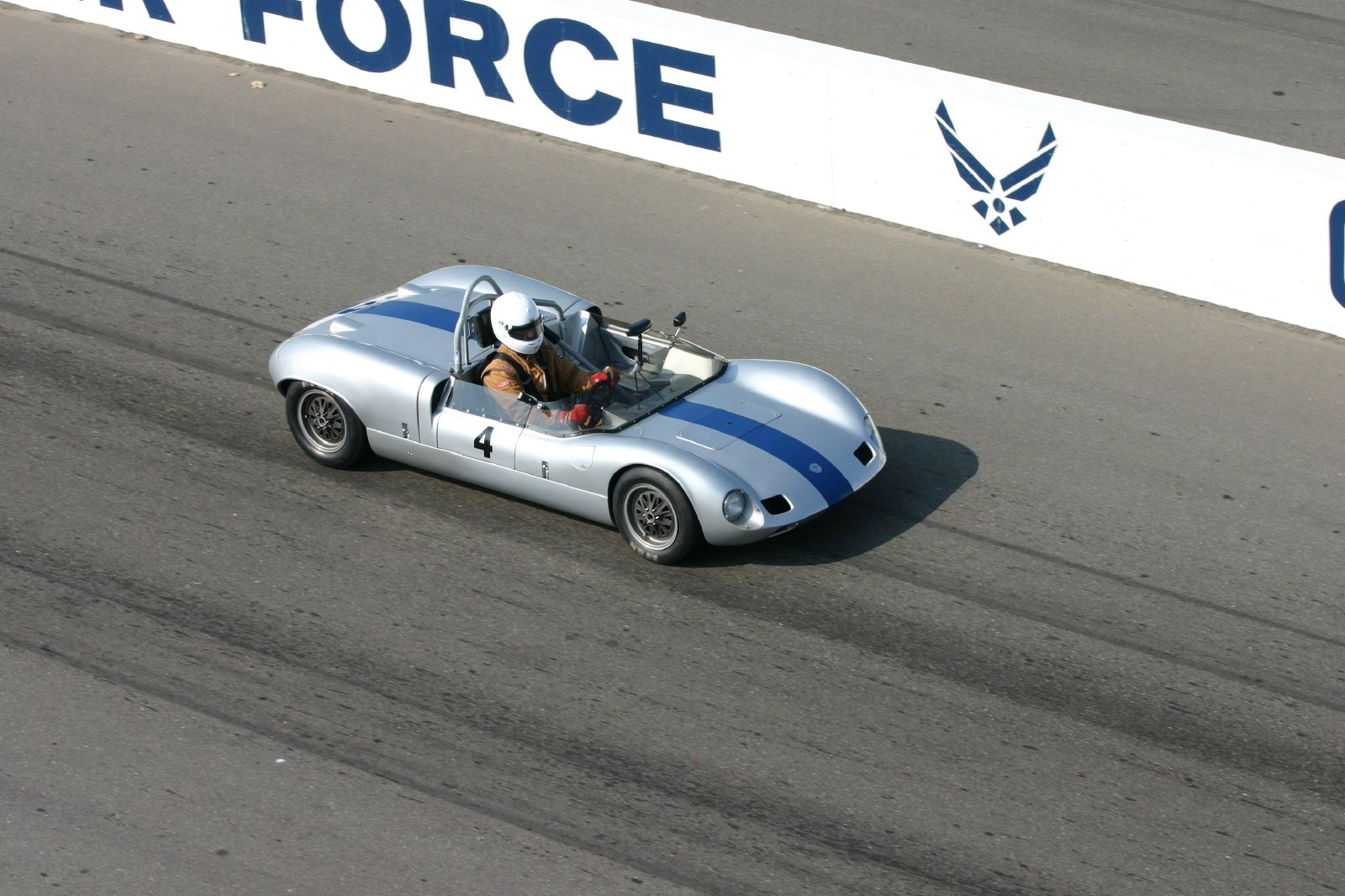
Elva Mk VII in 2004

After financial problems caused by the failure of the US distributor, Frank Nichols started a new company in Rye, Sussex in 1961 to continue building racing cars. The Elva Mk VI rear-engined sports car, still sticking with 1,100 cc Coventry Climax power, made its competition debut at Brands Hatch on Boxing Day, 1961, driven by Chris Ashmore, finishing second to the three-litre Ferrari of Graham Hill. The car was designed by Keith Marsden.

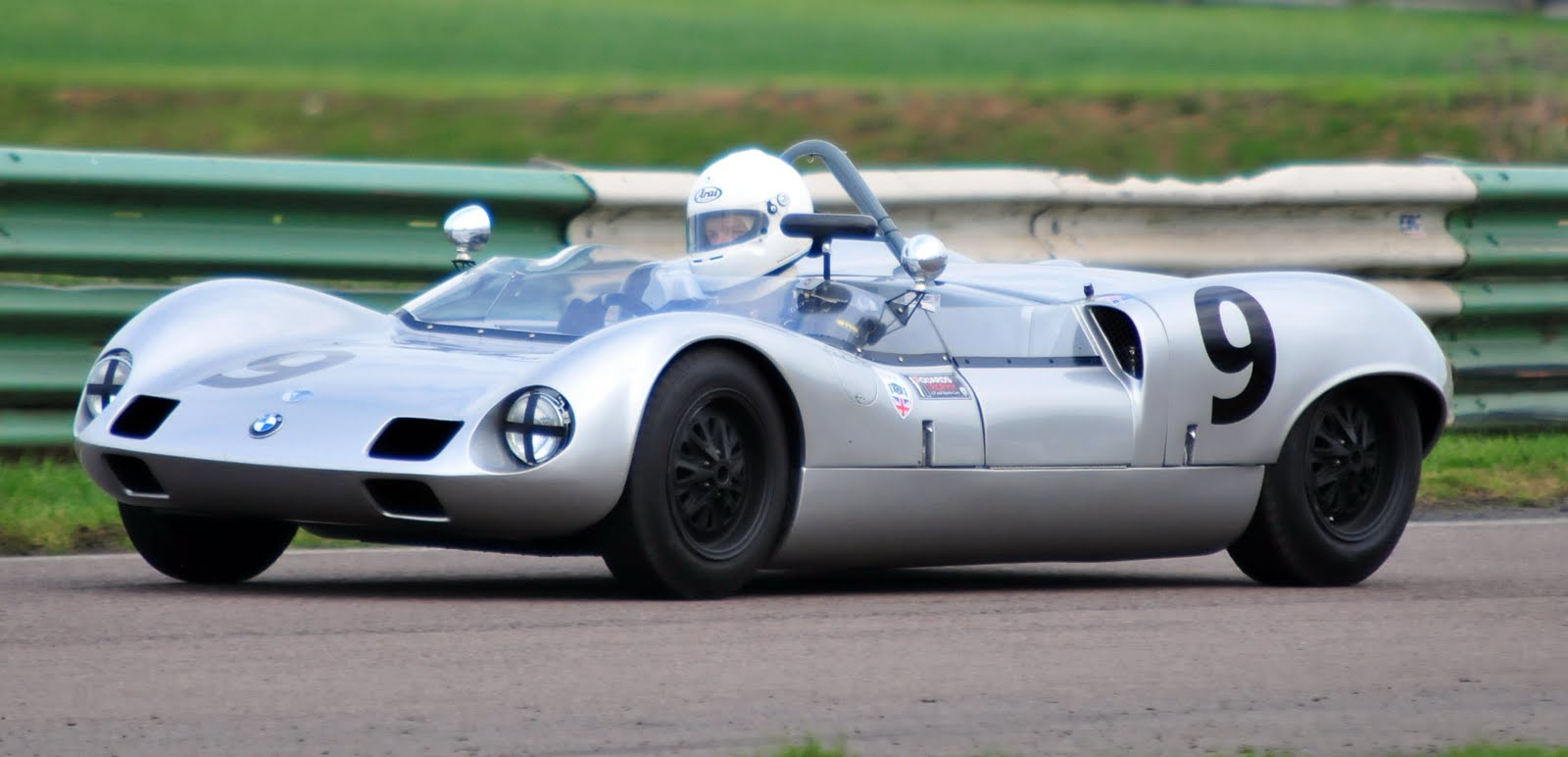
Elva BMW Mk VIII.

Around 1964–1966 Elva made a very successful series of Mk8 sports racers mostly with 1.8 litre BMW engines (modified from the 1.6 litre by Nerus) and some with 1.15 litre Holbay-Ford engines. The Mk8 had a longer wheelbase and wider track compared to the Mk7, which was known for difficult handling due to a 70-30 weight bias to the rear. Following the success of the McLaren in sportscar racing, Elva became involved in producing cars for sale to customers:

"Later a tie-up with Elva and the Trojan Group was arranged and they took over the manufacture of the McLaren sports/racer, under the name McLaren-Elva-Oldsmobile."

At the 1966 Racing Car Show, held in London in January, Elva exhibited two sports racing cars – the McLaren-Elva Mk.II V8 and the Elva-BMW Mk. VIIIS. The McLaren-Elva was offered with the option of Oldsmobile, Chevrolet or Ford V8 engines. The Elva-BMW Mk. VIIIS was fitted with a rear-mounted BMW two-litre four-cylinder OHC engine.

=== Elva Porsche ===
Around 1960, requests came from the US for a lightweight racing sports car with a Porsche engine. Porsche then developed for Elva the so-called Fuhrmann engine ( type 547) with four overhead camshafts, which received, among other things, a cooling fan wheel made of plastic lying horizontally above the crankcase. With a displacement of 1.7 liters and a compression ratio of 11:1, this unit produced 183 hp (136 kW) at 7800 rpm.

Porsche supplied 15 of these engines for installation in the appropriately adapted Elva Mk VII chassis. This adaptation included changes to the placement of the petrol and oil tanks, the cockpit, and the rear part of the tubular frame, among other things. The Porsche five-speed gearbox was matched to the 13-inch wheels (6 inches wide at the front and 7 inches at the rear).

On 8 September 1963, Bill Wuesthoff and Augie Pabst won the Road America 500, round seven of the United States Road Racing Championship, at Elkhart Lake, Wisconsin driving an Elva Mk.7-Porsche. "The Elva-Porsche is based on the Mark VII Elva, but redesigned aft of the front section to take the 1,700 cc Porsche air-cooled flat-four unit and its horizontal cooling fan."

The first vehicles were ready at the end of 1963. They accelerated from a standstill to 100 km/h in around 5 seconds and reached a top speed of around 260 km/h (160 mph). A car cost over $10,000.

In 1964, Porsche entered an Elva Mark VII chassis with the 8-cylinder Type 771 racing engine in the European Hill Climb Championship. This car weighed only about 520 kg and was therefore significantly lighter than the Porsche Bergspyder RS 61 (type 718) or the Spyder based on the Porsche 904. Edgar Barth won the opening round of the European Hill Climb Championship on 7 June 1964, at Rossfeld in southern Germany in an Elva-Porsche flat-eight sports car. The cars were placed throughout the seven-round series with Herbert Muller winning at the final round at Sierre Crans Montana in Switzerland on 30 August 1964. Because of the Elva's poorer driving characteristics, with its frame possibly too heavily loaded by the 8-cylinder engine, Barth started in the following races again with the old Porsche RS 61 and, like the previous year, won the sports car class of the championship.

The wheelbase of the car was 2286 mm, its track: front 1270 mm; rear 1350 mm, length of the vehicle: 3500 mm. The 8-cylinder engine was available in two versions: with a displacement of 2195 cm^{3} (bore × stroke = 80 × 54.6 mm), 270 hp at 8600 rpm, maximum torque 230 Nm at 7000 rpm, compression 10.2:1 and with 1981 cm^{3} (bore × stroke = 76 × 54.6 mm), 260 hp at 8800 rpm, 206 Nm at 7500 rpm, compression 10.5:1.

Luki Botha campaigned an Elva-Porsche in southern Africa from 1966.

=== Single Seater ===
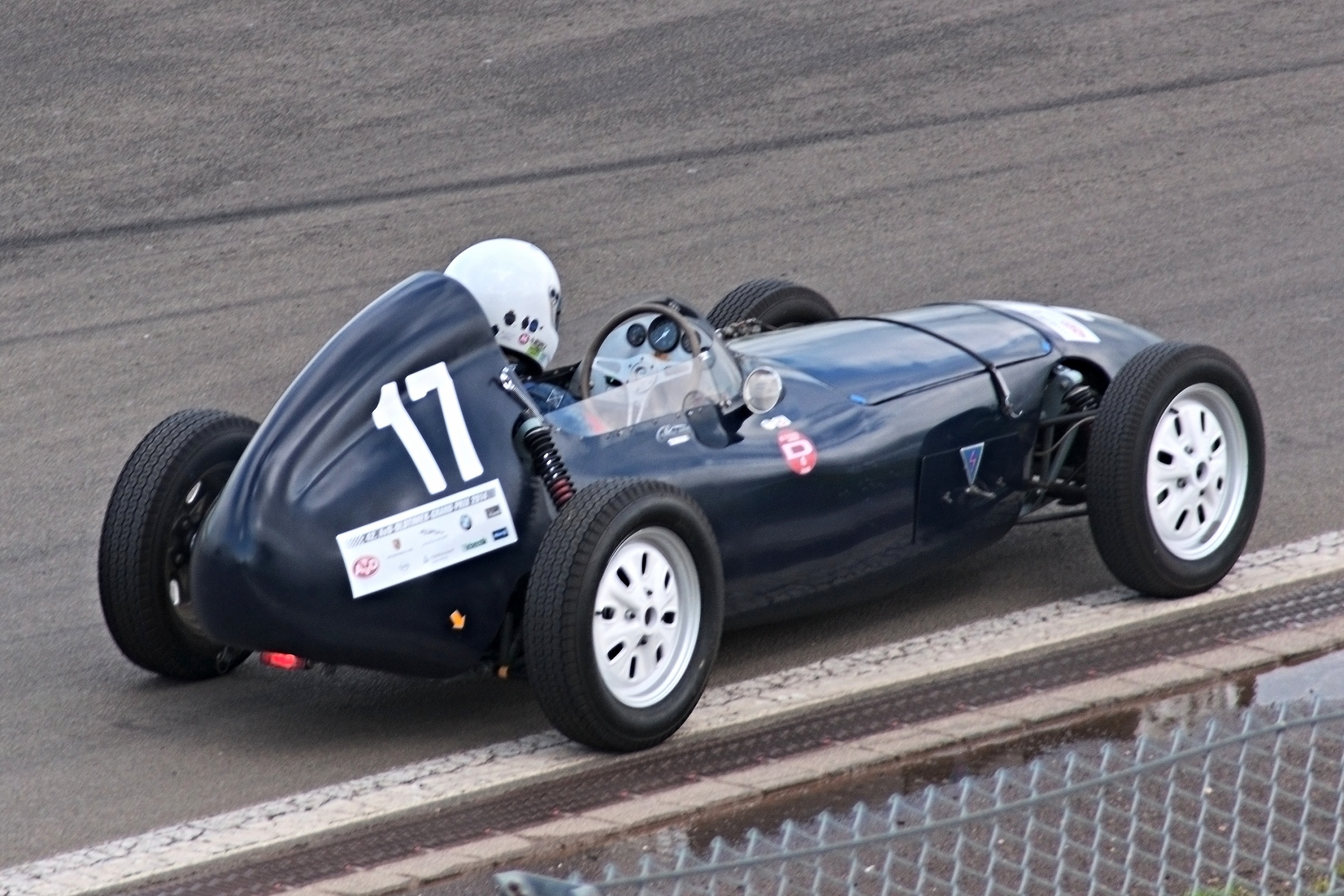
Elva FJ 100

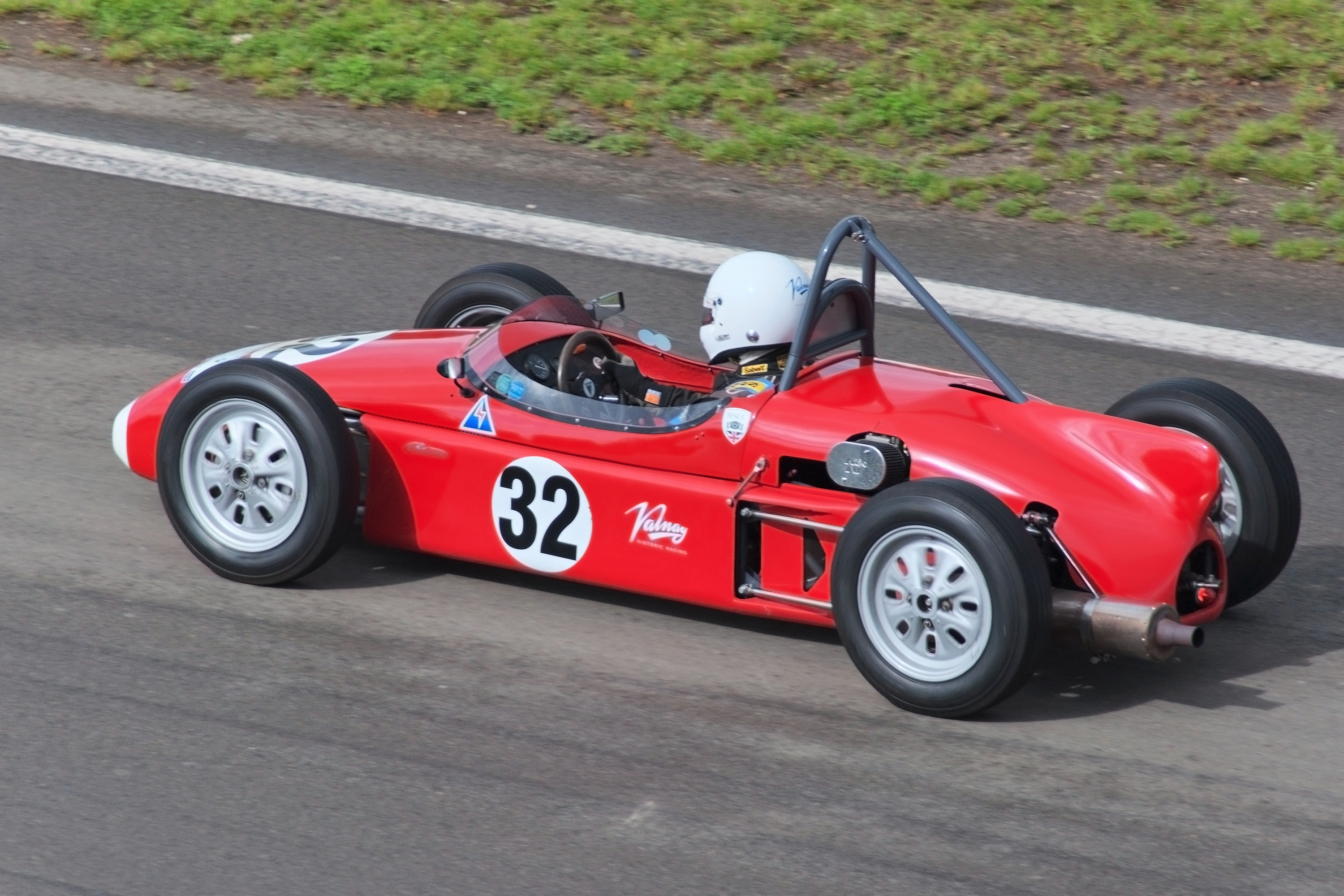
Elva FJ 200

Elva produced a single-seater car for Formula Junior events, the FJ 100, initially supplied with a front-mounted B.M.C. 'A' series engine in a tubular steel chassis.

"Elva Cars, Ltd., new Formula Junior powered by an untuned BMC 'A' Series 948cc engine. The price of this 970 lb. car is $2,725 in England. Wheelbase: 84", tread: 48", brake lining area: 163" sq. The 15" wheels are cast magnesium. Independent suspension front and rear with transverse wishbones, coil springs, and telescopic shock absorbers. The car is 12 feet, four inches long."

Bill de Selincourt won a race at Cadours, France, in an Elva-B.M.C. FJ on September 6, 1959. Nichols switched to a two-stroke DKW engine supplied by Gerhard Mitter. In 1959 Peter Arundell won the John Davy Trophy at the Boxing Day Brands Hatch meeting driving an Elva-D.K.W. "Orders poured in for the Elva but when the 1960 season commenced Lotus and Cooper had things under control and disillusioned Elva owners watched the rear-engined car disappearing round corners, knowing they had backed the wrong horse." Sporadic success continued for Elva in the early part of that year, with Jim Hall winning at Sebring and Loyer at Montlhéry.

Elva produced a rear-engined FJ car, with B.M.C. engine, at the end of the 1960 season, the Elva 200. Chuck Dietrich finished third at Silverstone in the BRDC British Empire Trophy race on 1 October. In 1961 "an entirely new and rather experimental Elva-Ford" FJ-car debuted at Goodwood, making fastest lap, driven by Chris Meek.

== Road cars ==
=== Elva Courier ===
Elva Courier
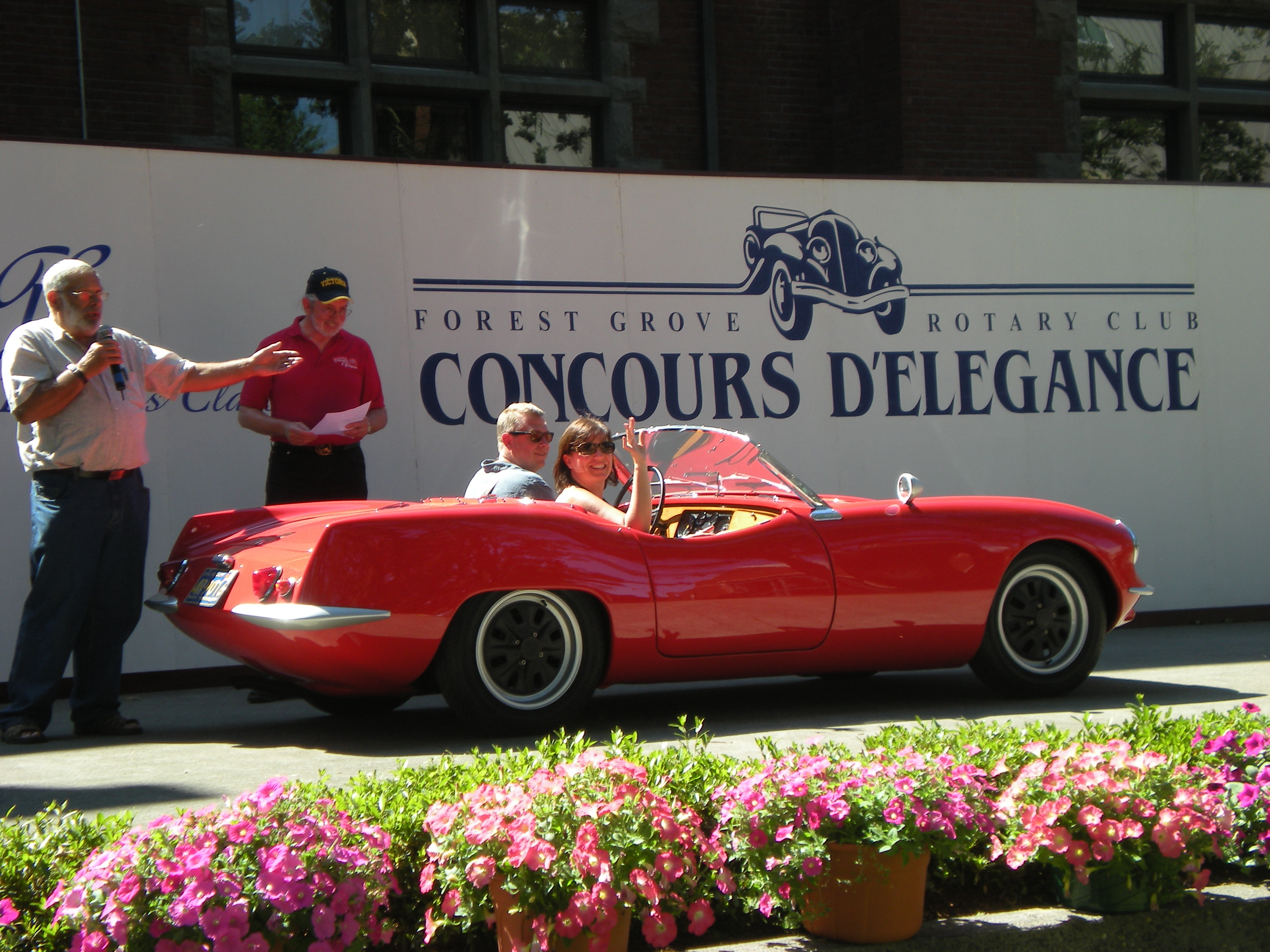

Overview
- Manufacturer: Elva
- Production: 1958–1969; 500 approx made

Body and chassis
- Class: sports car
- Body style: 2-door convertible 2-door coupe

Dimensions
- Wheelbase: 90 in (2,286 mm)
- Length: 154 in (3,912 mm)
- Width: 60 in (1,524 mm)

The main road car, introduced in 1958, was called the Courier and went through a series of developments throughout the existence of the company. Initially all the cars were exported, home market sales not starting until 1960. Mark Donohue had his first racing successes in an Elva Courier winning the SCCA F Prod Championship in 1960 and the SCCA E Prod Championship in 1961.

The Mk 1 used a 1500 cc MGA or Riley 1.5 litre engine in a ladder chassis with Elva designed independent front suspension. The engine was set well back in the chassis to help weight distribution, which produced good handling but encroached on the cockpit making the car a little cramped. The chassis carried lightweight 2-seater open glassfibre bodywork. It was produced as a complete car for the US and European market and available in kit form for the UK market. After about 50 cars were made it was upgraded to the Mk II which was the same car but fitted with a proprietary curved glass windscreen, replacing the original flat-glass split type, and the larger 1600 cc MGA engine. Approximately 400 of the Mk I and II were made.

The rights to the Elva Courier were acquired by Trojan in 1962, and production moved to the main Trojan factory in Purley Way, Croydon, Surrey. Competition Press announced: "Elva Courier manufacturing rights have been sold to Lambretta-Trojan in England. F-Jr Elva and Mark IV sports cars will continue to be built by Frank Nichols as in the past."

With the Trojan takeover the Mk III was introduced in 1962 and was sold as a complete car. On the home market a complete car cost £965 or the kit version £716. The chassis was now a box frame moulded into the body. Triumph rack and pinion steering and front suspension was standardised. A closed coupé body was also available with either a reverse slope Ford Anglia-type rear window or a fastback. In autumn 1962: "Elva Courier Mk IV was shown at London Show. New coupe has all-independent suspension, fibreglass body, MG engine. Mk III Couriers were also shown. Though previously equipped with MG-A engines, new versions will be equipped with 1800cc MG-B engine." Later the Ford Cortina GT unit was available. The final version, the fixed head coupé Mk IV T type used Lotus twin-cam engines with the body modified to give more interior room. It could be had with all independent suspension and four wheel disc brakes. 210 were made.

Ken Sheppard Customised Sports Cars of Shenley, Hertfordshire acquired the Elva Courier from Trojan in 1965 but production ended in 1968.

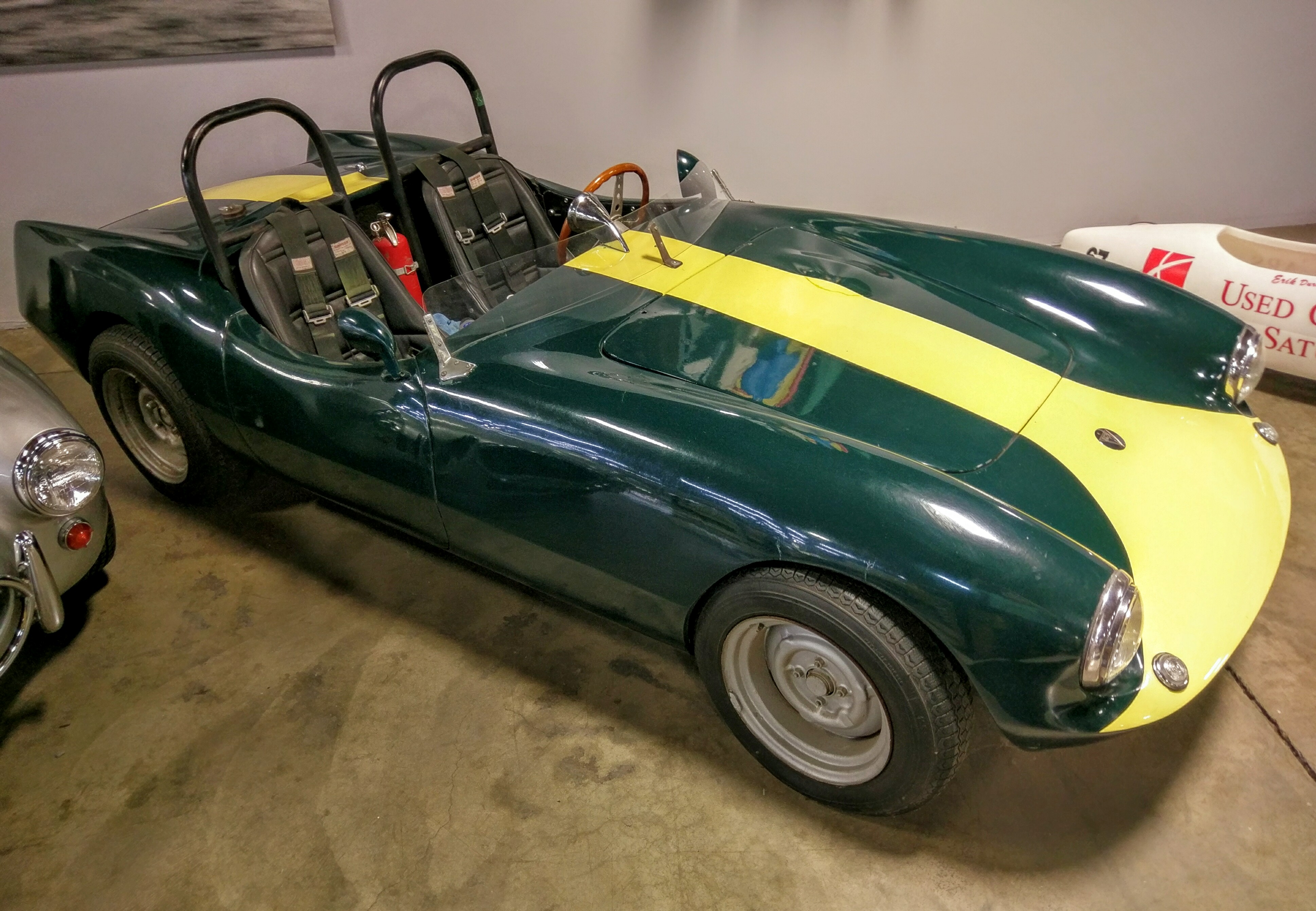
1959 Elva Courier Mark 1

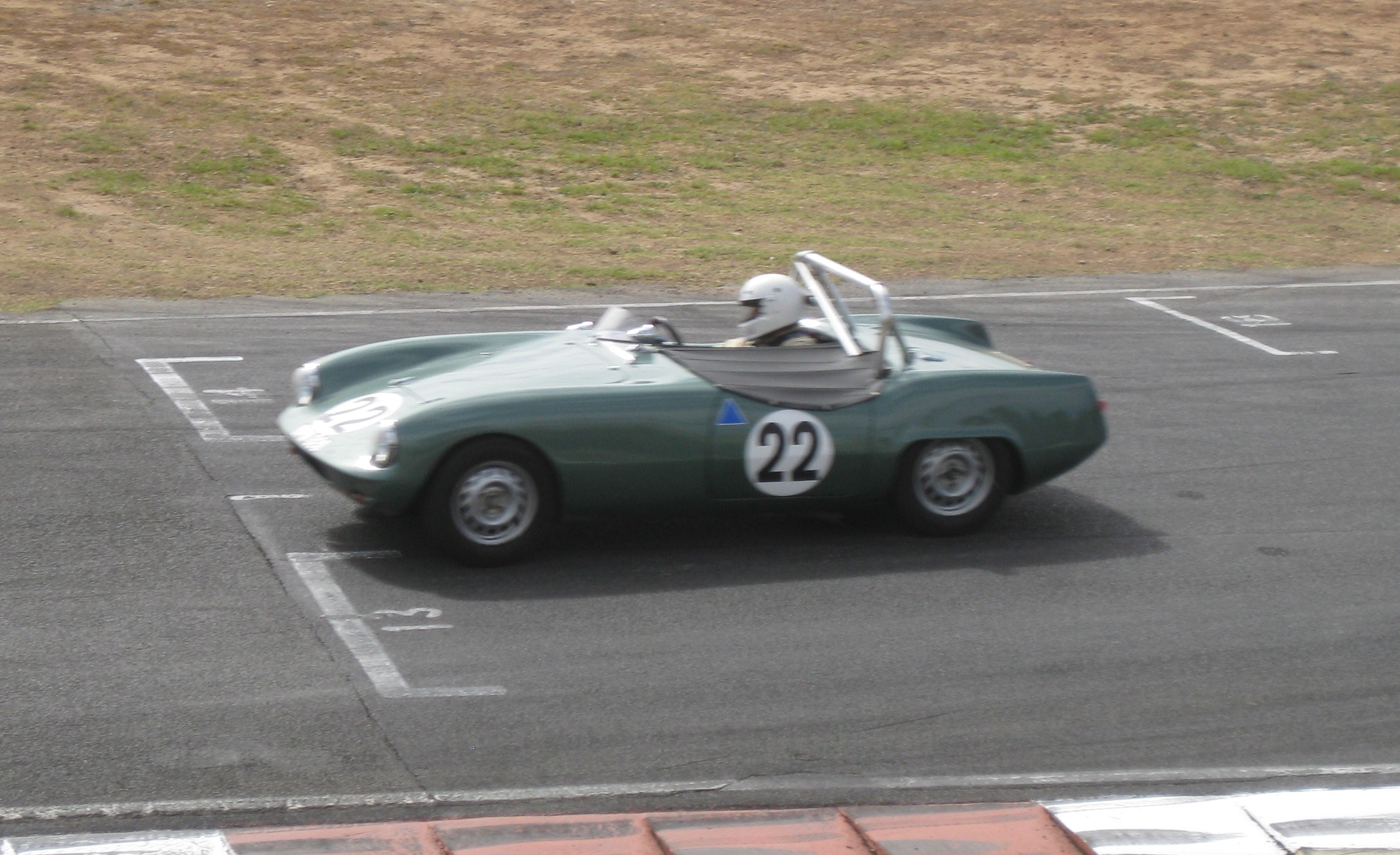
1960 Elva Courier

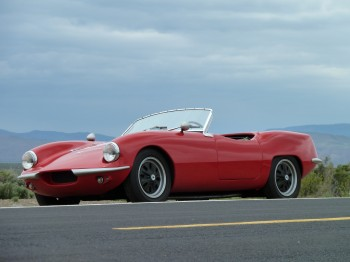
Elva Courier front/side view

=== GT160 ===
GT160
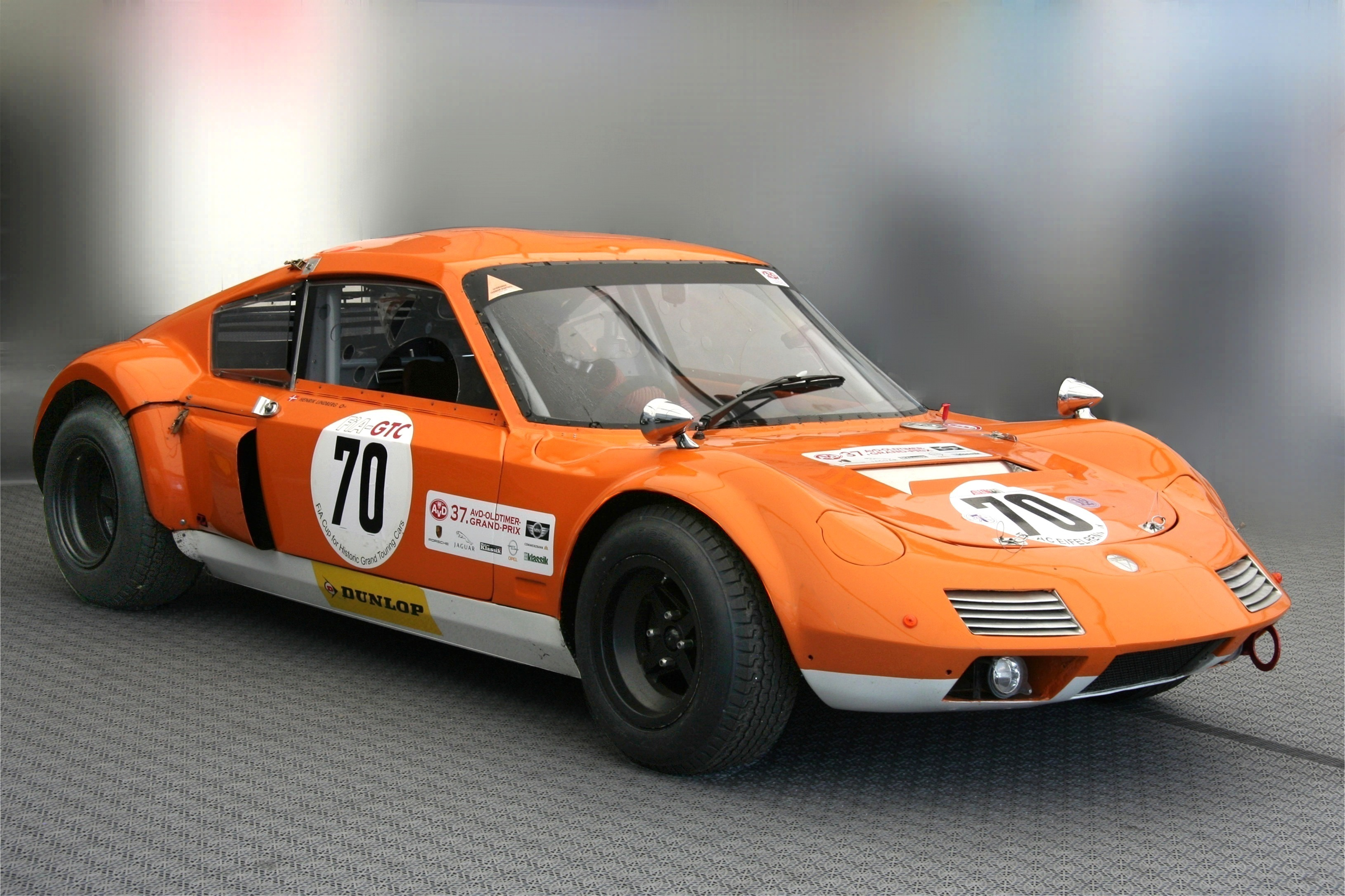

Overview
- Manufacturer: Elva
- Production: 1964
- Designer: Trevor Fiore

Body and chassis
- Class: Sports car

Dimensions
- Wheelbase: 93 in (2,362 mm)
- Length: 150 in (3,810 mm)
- Width: 60 in (1,524 mm)
- Curb weight: 1,232 lb (559 kg)

There was also a GT160 which never got beyond production of three prototypes. It used a BMW dry sump engine of 2 litre capacity with bodywork styled by Englishman Trevor Frost (also known as Trevor Fiore, and who also designed the Trident) and made by Carrozzeria Fissore of Turin. It weighed 11 long hundredweight (559 kg) and had 185 bhp (138 kW; 188 PS) so would have had very impressive performance but was deemed too costly to put into series production. The car was shown at the London Motor Show in 1964. One of the cars was purchased by Richard Wrottesley and entered in the 1965 24 Hours of Le Mans. Co-driven by Tony Lanfranchi, the car retired early in the race.

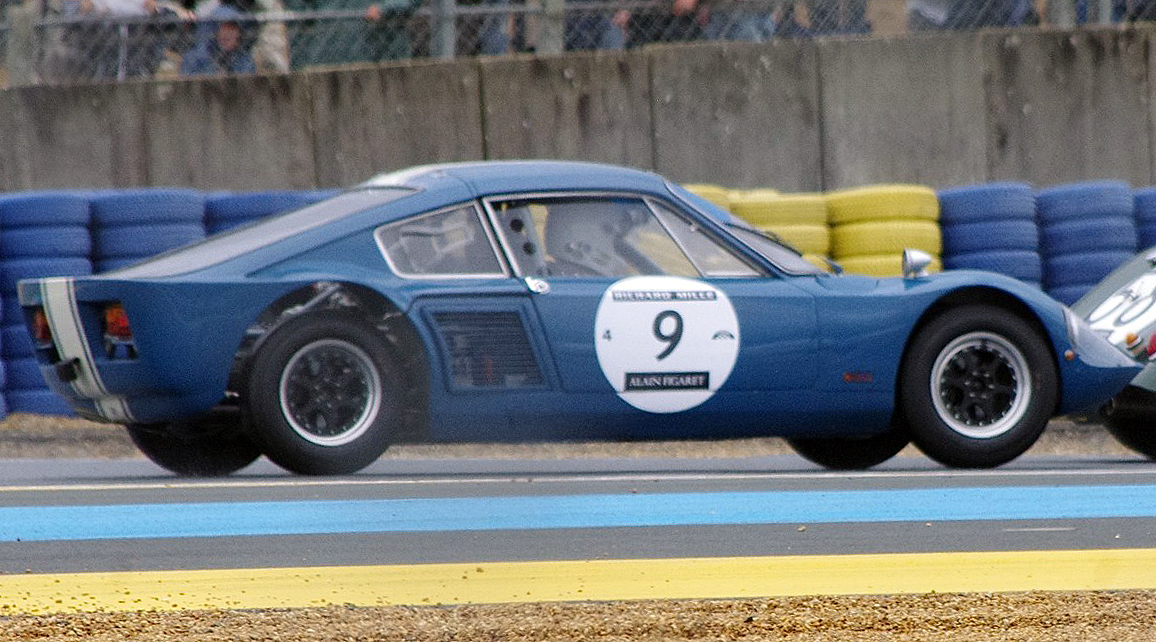
An Elva GT160 at the 2014 Le Mans Classic

== Voitures Elva, 1907 ==
There was another Elva car company, 'Voitures Elva' that lasted for one year, 1907, and was based in Paris, France.

== See also ==
- Archie Butterworth, supplied engines for the Elva-Butterworth car.
