= Dick Thompson (racing driver) =

American racing driver (1920–2014)

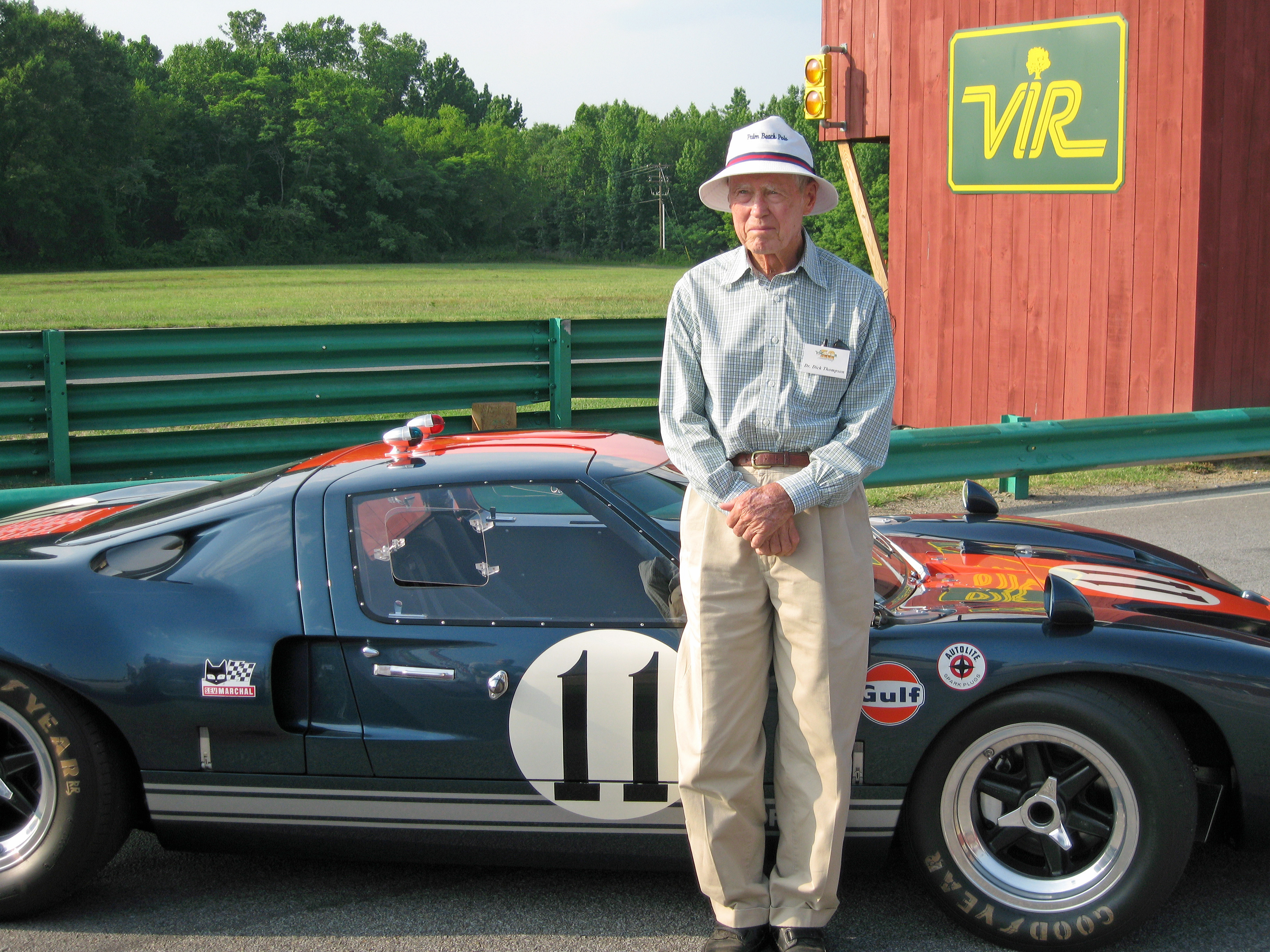
Dr. Dick Thompson in 2007

Richard Knight Thompson, Jr. (July 9, 1920 – September 14, 2014) was an American racecar driver. A Washington, D.C. dentist by trade, he is known as "The Flying Dentist". He won numerous Sports Car Club of America (SCCA) championships and was inducted into the Corvette Hall of Fame. Thompson brought credibility to the Corvette as a world-class sports car. Active from the late 1950s until the 1970s, Thompson raced for several notable racers, including the factory Corvette team for John Fitch and Briggs Cunningham.

Thompson started racing in 1952 in one of the first 12-hour races at Sebring International Raceway. He drove to the track in his MG TD, and co-drove the car to an eighth-place finish. He caught Corvette engineer Zora Arkus-Duntov's eye in 1956, when Thompson was the only driver to compete in a production Corvette. He won the SCCA championship in his Corvette in 1956, 1957, 1960, 1961 and 1962 in Classes A, B and C. He was selected to test drive a new Corvette Grand Sport at Sebring in December 1962. In 1963, he drove a Corvette Grand Sport to victory at Watkins Glen International. He took third place that year at Daytona International Speedway and won the GT class in 1970.

In 1967, Thompson won the 1000km of Spa with Jacky Ickx in the Gulf-liveried JW Automotive Mirage M1.

Thompson used his knowledge of the Corvette to write The Corvette Guide in 1958. He never made enough money to cover more than his expenses. He had never quit his dentistry business, so he decided to concentrate on that business full-time. He has raced occasionally in events since his retirement. He lived in Wellington, Florida as of October 2007. On September 14, 2014, he died of pneumonia at a hospice in West Palm Beach, Florida.

== Honors ==
Thompson was inducted in the Corvette Hall of Fame in 2000. Thompson was inducted in the Le Mans Drivers Hall of Fame in 2013. He was inducted in the Sports Car Club of America's Hall of Fame in January 2018.

== Racing record ==
=== 12 Hours of Sebring results ===
Year	Team	Co-Drivers	Car	Class	Laps	Pos.	Class Pos.
1952	(United States) R. K. Thompson Jr.	(United States) William Kinchloe	MG TD Mk II Special	S1.5	129	8th	3rd
1955	(United States) Jack Pry	(United States) Charles Wallace	Jaguar XK140	S5.0	163	10th	2nd
1957	(United States) John Fitch	(Switzerland) Gaston Andrey	Chevrolet Corvette C1	GT5.0	173	12th	1st
1958	(United States) Dick Thompson	(United States) John Kilbourn (United States) Fred Windridge	Chevrolet Corvette C1	GT5.0	144	33rd	2nd
1959	(United States) B.S. Cunningham	(United States) Walt Hansgen	Lister-Jaguar Knobbly	S3.0	164	12th	5th
1960	(United States) Jaguar Distributors of New York	(United States) Fred Windridge	Chevrolet Corvette C1	GT5.0	41	DNF	DNF
1961	(United States) Mono Corporation	(United States) John Fitch	Maserati Tipo 61	S3.0	?	DNF	DNF
1962	(United States) Briggs Cunningham	(United States) Walt Hansgen	Maserati Tipo 64	S3.0	30	DNF	DNF
1963	(United States) I. Grady Davis	(United States) Don Yenko	Chevrolet Corvette Sting Ray	GT +4.0	14	DNF	DNF
1963	(United States) I. Grady Davis	(United States) Duncan Black (United States) Ed Lowther (United States) M. R. J. Wyllie (United States) Don Yenko	Chevrolet Corvette Sting Ray	GT +4.0	167	DNF	DNF
1964	(United States) North American Racing Team	(United States) Bob Grossman	Ferrari 250 GTO LMB	GT3.0	186	15th	2nd
1965	(United States) Shaw Racing Team	(United States) Graham Shaw	Shelby Cobra	GT5.0	173	19th	4th
1966	(United States) Roger Penske	(United States) Dick Guldstrand	Chevrolet Corvette Grand Sport	P +5.0	65	DNF	DNF
1967	(United Kingdom) JW Automotive Engineering	(United States) Ed Lowther	Ford GT40	S5.0	119	DNF	DNF
1968	(United States) Howmet Corporation	(United States) Ray Heppenstall (United States) Ed Lowther	Howmet TX	P3.0	125	DNF	DNF

=== 24 Hours of Le Mans results ===
Year	Team	Co-Drivers	Car	Class	Laps	Pos.	Class Pos.
1960	(United States) B.S. Cunningham	(United States) Fred Windridge	Chevrolet Corvette C1 Coupé	GT5.0	207	DNF	DNF
1961	(United States) Briggs Cunningham	(United States) Augie Pabst	Maserati Tipo 63	S3.0	311	4th	3rd
1962	(United States) Briggs Cunningham	(United States) Bill Kimberley	Maserati Tipo 151 Coupé	E +3.0	62	DNF	DNF
1965	(United Kingdom) AC Cars Ltd.	(United Kingdom) Jack Sears	AC Cobra Daytona Coupé	GT5.0	304	8th	1st
1967	(United Kingdom) JW Automotive Engineering	(United Kingdom) David Piper	Mirage M1	P +5.0	59	DNF	DNF
1968	(United States) Howmet Engineering	(United States) Ray Heppenstal	Howmet TX	P3.0	84	DNF	DNF
