= 1963 SCCA National Sports Car Championship =

Seasons
- ← 1962 1964 →

The 1963 SCCA National Sports Car Championship season was the thirteenth season of the Sports Car Club of America's National Sports Car Championship. It began April 7, 1963, and ended September 2, 1963, after ten races.

== Schedule ==
Rnd	Race	Length^{A}	Circuit	Location	Date
1	SCCA National Race	45 minutes	Marlboro Motor Raceway	Upper Marlboro, Maryland	April 7
2	VIR National Cup	1 hour, 30 minutes	Virginia International Raceway	Danville, Virginia	April 27
3	Cumberland National Championship Sports Car Races	75 km (47 mi)	Greater Cumberland Regional Airport	Wiley Ford, West Virginia	May 12
4	SCCA National Race	90 mi (140 km)	Bridgehampton Race Circuit	Bridgehampton, New York	June 2
5	SCCA National Race	60 mi (97 km)	Lime Rock Park	Lakeville, Connecticut	June 15
6	June Sprints	160 mi (260 km)	Road America	Elkhart Lake, Wisconsin	June 23
7	Lake Garnett Grand Prix	70 mi (110 km)	Lake Garnett Circuit	Garnett, Kansas	July 8
8	Meadowdale SCCA National Championships	98 mi (158 km)	Meadowdale International Raceway	Carpentersville, Illinois	August 4
9	Glen Classic	100 mi (160 km)	Watkins Glen International	Watkins Glen, New York	August 25
10	SCCA National Races	60 mi (97 km)	Thompson International Speedway	Thompson, Connecticut	September 2

^A Feature race

== Season results ==
Feature race overall winners in bold.

Rnd	Circuit	AP Winning Team	BP Winning Team	CM Winning Team	CP Winning Team	DM Winning Team	DP Winning Team	EM Winning Team	EP Winning Team	FM Winning Team	FP Winning Team	GM Winning Team	GP Winning Team	HM Winning Team	HP Winning Team	Results
Rnd	Circuit	AP Winning Driver(s)	BP Winning Driver(s)	CM Winning Driver(s)	CP Winning Driver(s)	DM Winning Driver(s)	DP Winning Driver(s)	EM Winning Driver(s)	EP Winning Driver(s)	FM Winning Driver(s)	FP Winning Driver(s)	GM Winning Driver(s)	GP Winning Driver(s)	HM Winning Driver(s)	HP Winning Driver(s)	Results
1	Marlboro	Chevrolet	Chevrolet	no finishers	Daimler	**#6 Mecom Racing Team**	Porsche	Porsche	Porsche	Porsche	Lotus	Lola-Climax	Austin-Healey	Zink Petite	Austin-Healey	Results
1	Marlboro	(United States) Dick Lang	(United States) Don Yenko	no finishers	(United States) Duncan Black	**(United States) Roger Penske**	(United States) Alex Dearborn	(United States) Herb Swan	(United States) Ron Grable	(United States) Bob Holbert	(United States) Bob Sharp	(United States) M. R. J. Wyllie	(United States) Pete van der Vate	(United States) Bill Greer	(United States) Paul Hill	Results
2	VIR	#10 Chevrolet	#12 Grady Davis	**#26 Meister Brauser Racing**	#82 Fiat-Abarth	no entries	#44 Triumph	#43 Lotus	#7 Porsche	no entries	#11 Alfa Romeo	#88 Bobsy-Ford	#31 Austin-Healey	#87 Zink Petite	no entries	Results
2	VIR	(United States) Dick Thompson	(United States) Don Yenko	**(United States) Don Devine**	(United States) Paul Richards	no entries	(United States) Bob Tullius	(United States) Skip Barber	(United States) William Haenelt	no entries	(United States) Jack Crusoe	(United States) Chuck Dietrich	(United States) Pete van der Vate	(United States) Bill Greer	no entries	Results
3	Cumberland	Shelby	Chevrolet	#60 Briggs Cunningham	Fiat-Abarth	**#6 Mecom Racing Team**	Triumph	Porsche	#73 Porsche	Lotus	Triumph	Bosby	Morgan	Osca	Austin-Healey	Results
3	Cumberland	(United States) Bob Johnson	(United States) Robert Mouat	(United States) Walt Hansgen	(United States) Paul Richards	**(United States) Roger Penske**	(United States) Bob Tullius	(United States) Bob Holbert	(United States) Lake Underwood	(United States) T. A. Rees	(United States) Ed Diehl	(United States) Chuck Dietrich	(United States) Frank Nagel	(United States) John Igleheart	(United States) Donna Mae Mims	Results
4	Bridgehampton	Shelby	Chevrolet	**#60 Briggs Cunningham**	Fiat-Abarth	Ferrari	Triumph	Porsche	Austin-Healey	Lotus	Volvo	Genie	Austin-Healey	Osca	Austin-Healey	Results
4	Bridgehampton	(United States) Bob Johnson	(United States) Robert Mouat	**(United States) Walt Hansgen**	(United States) Paul Richards	(United States) Bob Grossman	(United States) Jim Spencer	(United States) Joe Buzzetta	(United States) Jim Ladd	(United States) Peter Sachs	(United States) Art Riley	(United States) John Fitch	(United States) Pete van der Vate	(United States) John Igleheart	(United States) Howard Blakeslee	Results
5	Lime Rock	A.C.	Chevrolet	Porsche	Morgan	no entries	Triumph	no entries	Porsche	**Lotus**	Alfa Romeo	Lola-Climax	Austin-Healey	Osca	Austin-Healey	Results
5	Lime Rock	(United States) Bob Brown	(United States) Don Yenko	(United States) Joe Buzzetta	(Switzerland) Gaston Andrey	no entries	(United States) Bob Tullius	no entries	(United States) Bill Romig	**(United States) Peter Sachs**	(United States) Jack Crusoe	(United States) M. R. J. Wyllie	(United States) Rod Harmon	(United States) John Igleheart	(United States) Paul Hill	Results
6	Road America	Shelby	Chevrolet	**Meister Brauser**	A.C.-Bristol	#94 Wayne Burnett	Triumph	Concours Motors	Sports Car Forum	Porsche	Alfa Romeo	Lola-Climax	Austin-Healey	Martin T	Austin-Healey	Results
6	Road America	(United States) Bob Johnson	(United States) Ed Smith	**(United States) Harry Heuer**	(United States) Fred Ellsworth	(United States) Wayne Burnett	(United States) Bob Tullius	(United States) Bill Wuesthoff	(United States) Don Sesslar	(United States) Lee Hall	(United States) Robert Shaw	(United States) M. R. J. Wyllie	(United States) Pete van der Vate	(United States) Martin Tanner	(United States) Fred Turek	Results
7	Lake Garnett	#33 Bob Johnson	Chevrolet	**Shelby American**	Morgan	Cooper	Triumph	no entries	Sports Car Forum	no entries	Lotus	Bosby	Austin-Healey	Lotus	Austin-Healey	Results
7	Lake Garnett	(United States) Bob Johnson	(United States) Don Yenko	**(United Kingdom) Ken Miles**	(United States) Lew Spencer	(United States) Jack Hinkle	(United States) John Goans	no entries	(United States) Don Sesslar	no entries	(United States) Dick Anderson	(United States) Chuck Dietrich	(United States) Robert Fry	(United States) Ed Walsh	(United States) Bruce Hoskins	Results
8	Meadowdale	Shelby	Chevrolet	**#0 Meister Brauser Team**	A.C.-Bristol	no entries	Triumph	^{A}	Austin-Healey	Porsche	Alfa Romeo	Bosby	Austin-Healey	Zink Petite	Austin-Healey	Results
8	Meadowdale	(United States) Bob Brown	(United States) Don Yenko	**(United States) Harry Heuer**	(United States) Bill Harwell	no entries	(United States) Jim Spencer	^{A}	(United States) Allan Barker	(United States) Lee Hall	(United States) Robert Shaw	(United States) Chuck Dietrich	(United States) Donald Hampton	(United States) Bill Greer	(United States) Donna Mae Mims	Results
9	Watkins Glen	#41 A.J. Griffith, Jr.	#2 Grady Davis	**#11 Grady Davis**	#4 Duncan Black	no entries	#53 Jim Spencer	Kelly Special-Porsche	Porsche	#3 Bosby Division	#15 Jerrold A. Truitt	#3 Bosby Division	#5 Erwin Lorincz	Osca	#12 Harvey Glass	Results
9	Watkins Glen	(United States) Bob Brown	(United States) Don Yenko	**(United States) Dick Thompson**	(United States) Duncan Black	no entries	(United States) Jim Spencer	(Canada) Wayne Kelly	(United States) Lake Underwood	(United States) Chuck Dietrich	(United States) Gerald Truitt	(United States) Chuck Dietrich	(United States) Erwin Lorincz	(United States) John Igleheart	(United States) Harvey Glass	Results
10	Thompson	Shelby	Porsche	Lister-Costin Buick	Daimler	**Porsche**	Triumph	no entries	Porsche	Porsche	Alfa Romeo	Elva	Austin-Healey	Osca	Austin-Healey	Results
10	Thompson	(United States) Bob Johnson	(United States) Bruce Jennings	(United States) Eno de Pasquale	(United States) Duncan Black	**(United States) Joe Buzzetta**	(United States) Bob Tullius	no entries	(United States) Lake Underwood	(United States) George Wintersteen	(United States) Tom Flaherty	(United States) Dave Fenton	(United States) Don Peaslee	(United States) John Gordon	(United States) Frank Cooper	Results

^A D and E Modified were classified with C Modified at Meadowdale.

== Champions ==
Class	Driver	Car
A Production	(United States) Bob Johnson	Shelby Cobra 289
B Production	(United States) Don Yenko	Chevrolet Corvette
C Modified	(United States) Harry Heuer	Chaparral 1-Chevrolet
C Production	(United States) Duncan Black	Daimler SP250
D Modified	(United States) Roger Penske	Zerex Special, Cooper T53-Climax
D Production	(United States) Bob Tullius	Triumph TR4
E Modified	(United States) Joe Buzzetta	Porsche 718 RSK
E Production	(United States) Lake Underwood	Porsche 356
F Modified	(United States) Peter Sachs	Lotus 23
F Production	(United States) Robert Shaw	Alfa Romeo Spyder
G Modified	(United States) Chuck Dietrich	Bosby Mk.II-Ford
G Production	(United States) Pete van der Vate	Austin-Healey Sprite
H Modified	(United States) Bill Greer	Zink Petite Mk.II
H Production	(United States) Donna Mae Mims	Austin-Healey Sprite
