= GT Challenge at VIR =

Sports car race held in Alton, Virginia

IMSA WeatherTech SportsCar Championship
- Venue: Virginia International Raceway
- Corporate sponsor: Michelin
- First race: 1957
- First USCC race: 2014
- Duration: 2 hours 40 minutes
- Most wins (driver): Walt Hansgen (4)
- Most wins (team): Briggs Cunningham (5)
- Most wins (manufacturer): Riley (7)

The GT Challenge at VIR is a sports car race that is held at the Virginia International Raceway in Alton, Virginia, since 1957.

== History ==
After being a part of the SCCA National Sports Car Championship and the IMSA GT Championship the race, along with the track, went on hiatus from the early 1970s until 2002. It returned as a round of the Rolex Sports Car Series, and then became an American Le Mans Series race in 2012. In 2014 the race joined the schedule of the United SportsCar Championship after the merger of the American Le Mans Series and the Rolex Sports Car Series.

The race length has varied from 150 to 500 km. The former title VIR 240 refers to the duration of 240 minutes (4 hours). In 2013, the race was renamed to the Oak Tree Grand Prix.

Beginning in 2016, the Oak Tree Grand Prix became the name of the Continental Tire SportsCar Challenge a support race runs during the same weekend as the United SportsCar Championship Michelin GT Challenge at VIR.

== Winners ==
| Season | Date | Overall winner(s) | Entrant | Car | Distance/Duration | Race title | Report |
SCCA National Sports Car Championship
| 1957 | August 4 | (United States) Carroll Shelby | (United States) John Engar | Maserati 450S | 100 km (62 mi) | Inaugural Grand Prix Sports Car Races | report |
| 1957 | October 27 | (United States) Charles Wallace | (United States) Briggs Cunningham | Jaguar D-type | 2 hours, 30 minutes | President's Cup Race | report |
| 1958 | May 4 | (United States) Walt Hansgen | (United States) Briggs Cunningham | Lister-Jaguar | 1 hour | National Championship Spring Sprint Sports Car Road Races | report |
| 1958 | October 5 | (United States) Walt Hansgen | (United States) Briggs Cunningham | Lister-Jaguar | 150 km (93 mi) | Autumn Festival Sports Car Races | report |
| 1959 | May 3 | (United States) Walt Hansgen | (United States) Briggs Cunningham | Lister-Jaguar | 200 km (120 mi) | VIR-Shrine National Championship Sports Car Races | report |
| 1960 | May 1 | (United States) Bob Holbert | | Porsche 718 RSK | 200 km (120 mi) | VIR-Shrine National Championship Sports Car Races | report |
| 1961 | April 30 | (United States) Walt Hansgen | (United States) Briggs Cunningham | Maserati Tipo 61 | 3 hours | President's Cup | report |
| 1962 | April 29 | (United States) Roger Penske | | Cooper T61 Monaco | 2 hours, 30 minutes | President's Cup | report |
| 1963 | April 27 | (United States) Don Devine | (United States) Meister Brauser Racing | Scarab Mark II-Chevrolet | 1 hour, 30 minutes | VIR National Cup | report |
| 1964 | April 19 | (United States) Ed Lowther | | Genie Mk.8-Ford | 58 mi (93 km) | National Championship Sports Car Races | report |
| 1965 – 1970 | Not held | | | | | | |
IMSA GT Championship
| 1971 | April 18 | (United States) Peter Gregg (United States) Hurley Haywood | (United States) Brumos Porsche-Audi | Porsche 914/6 | 300 mi (480 km) | Danville 300 | report |
| 1972 | April 16 | (United States) Peter Gregg (United States) Hurley Haywood | (United States) Peter Gregg | Porsche 911 S | 250 mi (400 km) | Danville 250 | report |
| 1973 – 2001 | Not held | | | | | | |
Rolex Sports Car Series
| 2002 | September 1 | (United Kingdom) Andy Wallace (United States) Chris Dyson | (United States) Dyson Racing | Crawford SSC2K-Judd | 500 mi (800 km) | VIR 500 | report |
| 2003 | October 5 | (United Kingdom) Andy Pilgrim (United States) Terry Borcheller | (United States) Bell Motorsports | Doran JE4-Chevrolet | 400 km (250 mi) | VIR 400 | report |
| 2004 | October 3 | (South Africa) Wayne Taylor (Italy) Max Angelelli | (United States) SunTrust Racing | Riley MkXI-Pontiac | 400 km (250 mi) | VIR 400 | report |
| 2005 | October 9 | (Mexico) Luis Díaz (United States) Scott Pruett | (United States) Chip Ganassi Racing | Riley MkXI-Lexus | 2 hours, 45 minutes | VIR 400 | report |
| 2006 | April 23 | (Germany) Mike Rockenfeller (United States) Patrick Long | (United States) Alex Job Racing | Crawford DP03-Porsche | 400 km (250 mi) | VIR 400 | report |
| 2007 | April 29 | (South Africa) Wayne Taylor (Italy) Max Angelelli (Denmark) Jan Magnussen | (United States) SunTrust Racing | Riley MkXI-Pontiac | 400 km (250 mi) | VIR 400 | report |
| 2008 | April 27 | (United States) Scott Pruett (Mexico) Memo Rojas | (United States) Chip Ganassi Racing | Riley MkXX-Lexus | 250 mi (400 km) | Bosch Engineering 250 at VIR | report |
| 2009 | April 25 | (United States) Jon Fogarty (United States) Alex Gurney | (United States) GAINSCO/Bob Stallings Racing | Riley MkXX-Pontiac | 2 hours, 45 minutes | Bosch Engineering 250 at VIR | report |
| 2010 | April 24 | (United States) Scott Pruett (Mexico) Memo Rojas | (United States) Chip Ganassi Racing | Riley MkXX-Lexus | 2 hours, 45 minutes | Bosch Engineering 250 at VIR | report |
| 2011 | May 14 | (Portugal) João Barbosa (United States) Terry Borcheller (United States) J. C. France | (United States) Action Express Racing | Riley MkXI-Porsche | 2 hours, 45 minutes | Bosch Engineering 250 at VIR | report |
American Le Mans Series
| 2012 | September 15 | (Germany) Lucas Luhr (Germany) Klaus Graf | (United States) Muscle Milk Pickett Racing | HPD ARX-03a | 4 hours | American Le Mans Series VIR 240 | report |
| 2013 | October 5 | (Germany) Lucas Luhr (Germany) Klaus Graf | (United States) Muscle Milk Pickett Racing | HPD ARX-03a | 2 hours, 45 minutes | Oak Tree Grand Prix at VIR | report |
United SportsCar Championship
| 2014 | August 24 | (Mexico) Luis Díaz (United States) Sean Rayhall | (United States) 8 Star Motorsports | Oreca FLM09-Chevrolet | 1 hour, 30 minutes (2 x 45-minute segments) | Oak Tree Grand Prix at VIR | report |
| 2014 | August 24 | (Italy) Giancarlo Fisichella (Germany) Pierre Kaffer | (United States) Risi Competizione | Ferrari 458 Italia GT2 | 2 hours, 45 minutes | Oak Tree Grand Prix at VIR | report |
| 2015 | August 23 | (France) Patrick Pilet (United Kingdom) Nick Tandy | (United States) Porsche North America | Porsche 911 (991) RSR | 2 hours, 40 minutes | Oak Tree Grand Prix at VIR | report |
| 2016 | August 28 | (Spain) Antonio García (Denmark) Jan Magnussen | (United States) Corvette Racing | Chevrolet Corvette C7.R | 2 hour, 40 minutes | Michelin GT Challenge at VIR | report |
| 2017 | August 27 | (Spain) Antonio García (Denmark) Jan Magnussen | (United States) Corvette Racing | Chevrolet Corvette C7.R | 2 hour, 40 minutes | Michelin GT Challenge at VIR | report |
| 2018 | August 19 | (United States) Connor De Phillippi (United Kingdom) Alexander Sims | (United States) BMW Team RLL | BMW M8 GTE | 2 hour, 40 minutes | Michelin GT Challenge at VIR | report |
| 2019 | August 25 | (France) Patrick Pilet (United Kingdom) Nick Tandy | (United States) Porsche GT Team | Porsche 911 RSR | 2 hour, 40 minutes | Michelin GT Challenge at VIR | report |
| 2020 | August 22 | (Spain) Antonio García (United States) Jordan Taylor | (United States) Corvette Racing | Chevrolet Corvette C8.R | 2 hour, 40 minutes | Michelin GT Challenge at VIR | report |
| 2021 | October 9 | (United States) Tommy Milner (United Kingdom) Nick Tandy | (United States) Corvette Racing | Chevrolet Corvette C8.R | 2 hour, 40 minutes | Michelin GT Challenge at VIR | report |
| 2022 | August 28 | (Australia) Matt Campbell (France) Mathieu Jaminet | (Canada) Pfaff Motorsports | Porsche 911 GT3 R | 2 hour, 40 minutes | Michelin GT Challenge at VIR | report |
| 2023 | August 27 | (Spain) Antonio García (United States) Jordan Taylor | (United States) Corvette Racing | Chevrolet Corvette C8.R GTD | 2 hour, 40 minutes | Michelin GT Challenge at VIR | report |
| 2024 | August 25 | (United States) Bryan Sellers (United States) Madison Snow | (United States) Paul Miller Racing | BMW M4 GT3 | 2 hour, 40 minutes | Michelin GT Challenge at VIR | report |
| 2025 | August 24 | (United Kingdom) Alexander Sims (Spain) Antonio García | (United States) Corvette Racing by Pratt Miller Motorsports | Chevrolet Corvette Z06 GT3.R | 2 hour, 40 minutes | Michelin GT Challenge at VIR | report |
| 2026 | August 23 | (Italy) Andrea Caldarelli (United Kingdom) Sandy Mitchell | (Canada) Pfaff Motorsports | Lamborghini Temerario GT3 | 2 hour, 40 minutes | Michelin GT Challenge at VIR | report |
