= 1966 Trans-American Sedan Championship =

1966 Trans-Am Series

Seasons
- ← none 1967 →

The 1966 Trans-American Sedan Championship was the inaugural running of the Sports Car Club of America's Trans-Am Series auto racing series. It was open to FIA Group 1 and FIA Group 2 cars and was contested over seven races. Manufacturers titles were awarded for both Over 2 Liter and Under 2 Liter cars with Ford and Alfa Romeo winning their respective class championships. Horst Kwech and Gaston Andrey were subsequently named Drivers co-champions in 1980 when the SCCA retroactively named drivers championships for the series after the 1980 season.

== Schedule ==
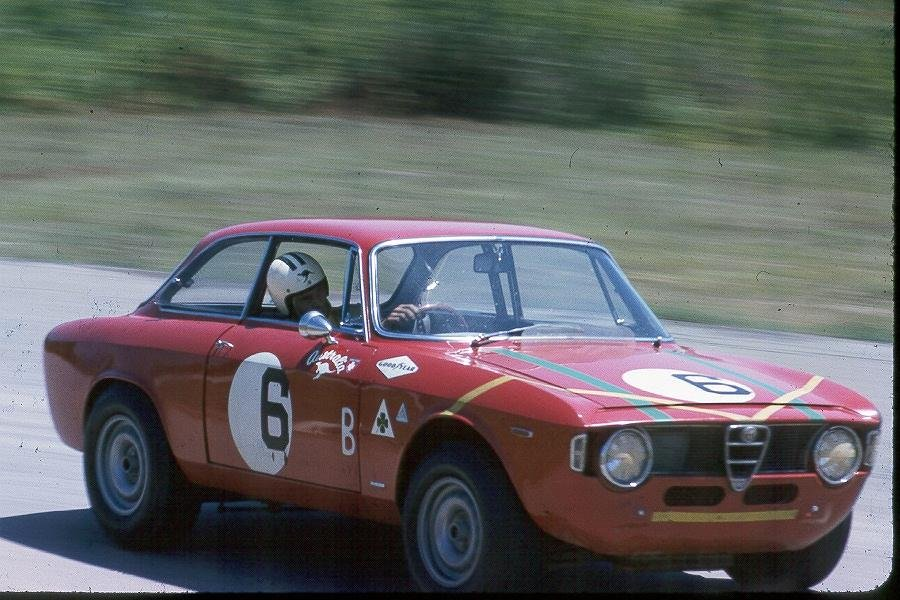
Alfa Romeo won the Under 2 liter championship with its GTA model

The championship was contested over a seven race series. Overall winner race winners are shown in bold.

Rnd	Race	Date	Circuit	Distance	Over 2 liter - Winning car	Under 2 liter - Winning car
Rnd	Race	Date	Circuit	Distance	Over 2 liter - Winning driver(s)	Under 2 liter - Winning driver(s)
1	Sebring 4-Hour International Touring Race	March 25	Sebring International Raceway, Sebring, Florida	348.4 mi (560.7 km)	Dodge Dart	**Alfa Romeo GTA**
1	Sebring 4-Hour International Touring Race	March 25	Sebring International Raceway, Sebring, Florida	348.4 mi (560.7 km)	(United States) Bob Tullius (United States) Tony Adamowicz	**(Austria) Jochen Rindt**
2	Mid-America 300	June 12	Mid-America Raceway, Wentzville, Missouri	299.25 mi (481.60 km)	**Ford Mustang**	Alfa Romeo GTA
2	Mid-America 300	June 12	Mid-America Raceway, Wentzville, Missouri	299.25 mi (481.60 km)	**(United States) Tom Yeager** **(United States) Bob Johnson**	(Australia) Horst Kwech (Switzerland) Gaston Andrey
3	Bryar 250	July 10	Bryar Motorsports Park, Loudon, New Hampshire	250 mi (400 km)	Plymouth Barracuda	**Ford Cortina Lotus**
3	Bryar 250	July 10	Bryar Motorsports Park, Loudon, New Hampshire	250 mi (400 km)	(United States) Bruce Jennings	**(Canada) Allan Moffat**
4	VIR 400	July 31	Virginia International Raceway, Danville, Virginia	400.5 mi (644.5 km)	**Ford Mustang**	Alfa Romeo GTA
4	VIR 400	July 31	Virginia International Raceway, Danville, Virginia	400.5 mi (644.5 km)	**(United States) Tom Yeager** **(United States) Bob Johnson**	(Australia) Horst Kwech (Switzerland) Gaston Andrey
5	Marlboro 12-Hour	August 14	Marlboro Park Speedway, Upper Marlboro, Maryland	12 Hours; 688.5 mi (1,108.0 km)	**Dodge Dart**	Alfa Romeo GTA
5	Marlboro 12-Hour	August 14	Marlboro Park Speedway, Upper Marlboro, Maryland	12 Hours; 688.5 mi (1,108.0 km)	**(United States) Bob Tullius** **(United States) Tony Adamowicz**	(United States) Harry Theodorocopulous (United States) Sam Posey
6	Pan-American Endurance Race	September 10	Green Valley Raceway, Smithfield, Texas	6 Hours; 391.84 mi (630.61 km)	**Ford Mustang**	Alfa Romeo GTA
6	Pan-American Endurance Race	September 10	Green Valley Raceway, Smithfield, Texas	6 Hours; 391.84 mi (630.61 km)	**(United States) John McComb** **(United States) Brad Booker**	(Australia) Horst Kwech (Switzerland) Gaston Andrey
7	Riverside 4-hour race	September 18	Riverside International Raceway, Riverside, California	4 Hours; 351 mi (565 km)	**Ford Mustang**	Lotus Cortina
7	Riverside 4-hour race	September 18	Riverside International Raceway, Riverside, California	4 Hours; 351 mi (565 km)	**(United States) Jerry Titus**	(Australia) Frank Gardner

== Season review ==
The Dodge Dart of Bob Tullius won the Over 2 liter class at the opening race at Sebring International Raceway, while the Alfa Romeo GTA of Formula One driver Jochen Rindt won the Under 2 liter class and was placed first overall.

Over the course of the championship Ford Mustangs won the Over 2 liter class at four races with Dodge Darts winning twice and Plymouth Barracuda once. Alfa Romeo GTAs won the Under 2 liter class at five races with Ford Cortina Lotus winning twice. Ford and Alfa Romeo won their respective class championships.

== Points system ==
Points were awarded according to finishing position. Only the highest-placed car scored points for the manufacturer. Drivers' championships were not awarded in Trans-Am until 1972.

1st	2nd	3rd	4th	5th	6th
9	6	4	3	2	1

== Championship standings ==
=== Over 2 liter class ===
Pos	Manufacturer	Seb	MAR	Bry	VIR	Mar	GRV	RIV	Pts
1	Ford	5	1	2	1	5	1	1	46
2	Chrysler-Plymouth	2	2	1	3	2	2	5	39
3	Dodge	1	5	4		1	3	2	33
4	Chevrolet	4							3

=== Under 2 liter class ===
Pos	Manufacturer	Seb	MAR	Bry	VIR	Mar	GRV	RIV	Pts
1	Alfa Romeo	1	1	2	1	1	1	2	57
2	Ford of Britain		2	1		2	2	1	36
3	BMW	6			4				4
4	BMC						4		3
5	Volvo				5				2
6	Fiat Abarth					6			1

== The cars ==
The following models scored championship points for their respective manufacturers.

=== Over 2 liter class ===
- Ford Mustang
- Plymouth Barracuda
- Dodge Dart
- Chevrolet Corvair

=== Under 2 liter class ===
- Alfa Romeo GTA
- Ford Cortina Lotus
- BMW 1800TI & 1800 TISA
- BMC Cooper S
- Volvo 122S
- Fiat Abarth 1000 TC

== See also ==
- 1966 Can-Am season
- 1966 United States Road Racing Championship season
