= 1962 Daytona SCCA National Race =

The January 22, 1962, race at Daytona International Speedway was the first racing event of the twelfth season of the Sports Car Club of America's 1962 Championship Racing Series.

SCCA National Daytona [AP+BP+BM+CM+DM+EM+FM]
(Race Results) Pos. No. Driver / Nationality Car Entrant Laps Time/retired Pos. Group Pos. Practice

Div.	Finish	Driver	Car Model	Car #	Comments
CM	1st	Alan Connell	Maserati Tipo 61	5	1st in C Mod.
CM	2d	Harry Heuer	Chaparral 1 Chevrolet	00	
EM	3rd	Bob Holbert	Porsche 718	14	1st in E Mod.
CM	4th	Art Huttinger	Lister - Corvette	24	
EM	5th	Chuck Cassel	Porsche 718	16	
AP	6th	Doug Thiem	Ferrari 250 GT	77	1st in A prod.
AP	7th	Dick Thompson	Corvette	11	
BP	8th	Ed Lowther	Corvette	12	
FM	9th	Joseph Hoppen	Porsche 550 Spyder	42	1st in F Mod.
AP	10th	Ralph Salyer	Corvette	25	
FM	11th	Bob Staples	Porsche RS	21	
CM	12th	Bob Spooner	Doane Special	33	
AP	13th	Bob Brown	Corvette	41	
CM	14th	Art Habersin	Chevrolet Healey Roadster	69	
AP	15th	Grady Davis	Corvette	111	
AP	16th	Dick Lang	Corvette	85	Bad Tires
AP	17th	Jerry Dunbar	Edwards Mk.7	32	
