= 1962 Cumberland National Championship Sports Car Races =

The May 13, 1962 Cumberland National Championship Sports Car Races was the fourth racing event of the twelfth season of the Sports Car Club of America's 1962 Championship Racing Series.

SCCA National Cumberland [AP+BP] results

Div.	Finish	Driver	Car Model	Car #	Comments
AP	1st	Dick Thompson	Corvette 327	11	
AP	2d	Bob Grossman	Ferrari 250	90	
AP	3rd	Charlie Hayes	Ferrari 250	7	
AP	4th	Dick Lang	Corvette	85	
AP	5th	Ben Moore	Corvette	18	
AP	6th	Chuck Dietrich	Ferrari 250	27	
AP	7th	Doug Thiem	Ferrari 250	7	
BP	8th	Ralph Salyer	Corvette	1	1st in BP
AP	9th	Bob Brown	Corvette	41	
AP	10th	Martin Kinner	Corvette	47	
BP	11th	Grady Davis	Corvette	2	
BP	12th	Bruce Jennings	Porsche 356	79	
BP	13th	Bob Spooner	Corvette	33	
AP	14th	Ed Myers	Corvette	84	
BP	15th	George McKean	Corvette	24	
BP	16th	Ed Fuchs	Porsche 356	36	
AP	17th	Allan Wylie	Ferrari 250 GT	9	
AP	18th	Tom Fleming	Jaguar XKE	72	
BP	19th	Rod Semrad	Porsche 356	135	
AP	20th	Harry Mergner	Corvette	8	
BP	21st	Mary Haines Collins	Corvette	205	
BP	22d	Barnie Burnett	Porsche 356	221	
BP	23d	Morrow Decker	Porsche 356	0	
BP	24th	Roy Jumnick	Corvette	44	
