= 1963 Marlboro SCCA National Race =

The April 7, 1963, race at Marlboro Motor Raceway was the opening race of the thirteenth season of the Sports Car Club of America's National Sports Car Championship.

A&B Production Results

| Finish | Driver | Car Model | Car # | Comments |
|---|---|---|---|---|
| 1st | Dick Thompson | Corvette Sting Ray | 11 | Led whole race |
| 2nd | Dick Lang | Corvette Sting Ray | 8 | |
| 3rd | Grady Davis | Corvette Sting Ray | 2 | |
| 4th | ? | ?? | ? | |
| 5th | Don Yenko | Corvette | 1 | 1957 Corvette. 1st in B Production |
| 6th | Bob Johnson | Cobra | 33 | Special Sebring ed. prepared by Ford |
| 7th | Dan Gerber | Cobra | 46 | |
