= 1962 President's Cup Races =

The April 29, 1962, race at Virginia International Raceway was the third racing event of the twelfth season of the Sports Car Club of America's 1962 Championship Racing Series.

SCCA National Virginia - Classes: AP+BP+CP
(Race Results)

Div.	Finish	Driver	Car Model	Car #	Comments
AP	1st	Dick Thompson	Corvette 327	11	
AP	2d	Ben Moore	Corvette 327	18	
AP	3rd	Dick Lang	Corvette 327	58	
BP	4th	Don Yenko	Corvette	12	1st in B Prod.
AP	5th	Bob Brown	Corvette 327	41	
BP	6th	Bruce Jennings	Porsche 356 Carrera	77	
AP	7th	Roy Kumnick	Corvette 327	47	
BP	8th	Grady Davis	Corvette	31	
CP	9th	Dave Clark	Lotus Super 7	37	1st in C Prod.
CP	10th	Ross McCain	Morgan	72	
CP	11th	Paul Richards	Alfa Romeo Special	21	
BP	12th	George McKean	Corvette	42	
CP	13th	Don Greimel	Morgan	97	
CP	14th	Harvey Marks	Porsche 356	5	
AP	15th	Henry Mergner	Corvette 327	8	
