= Maxdata =

German information companies

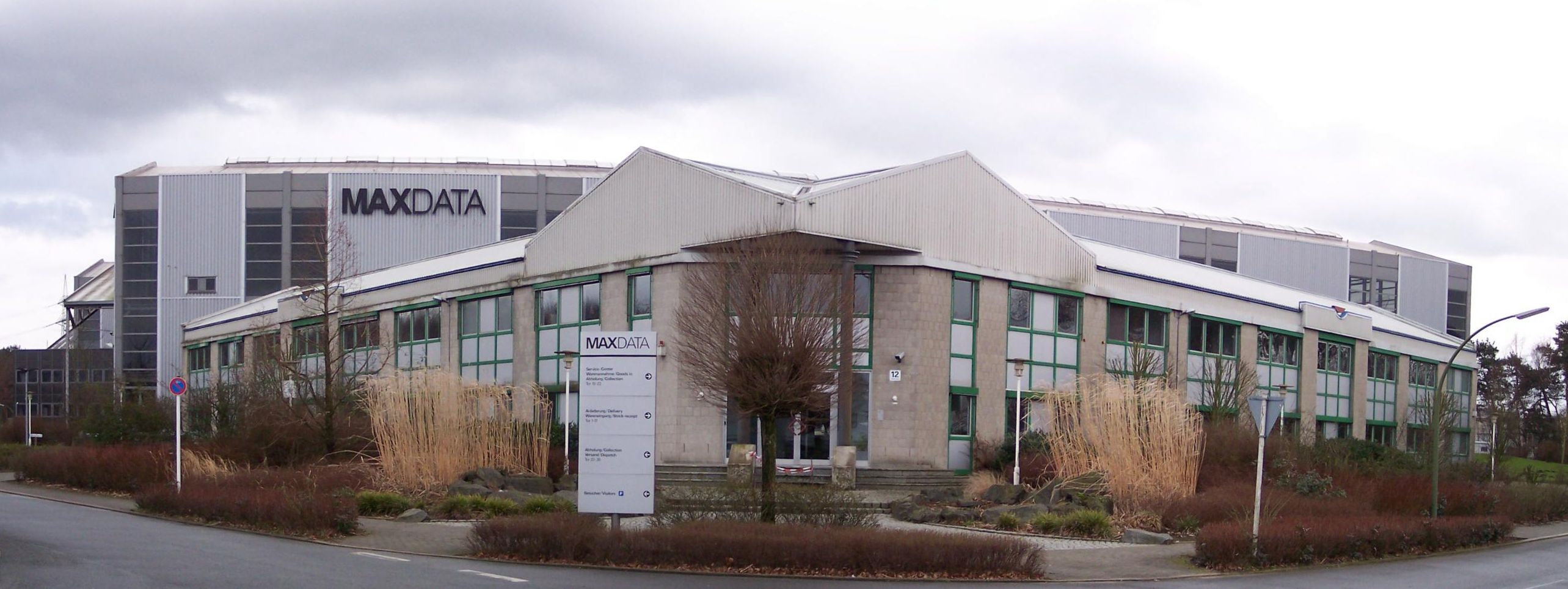
- Native name: Maxdata Computer GmbH (1987-2003); Maxdata AG (2003-2010)
- Headquarters: Marl, North Rhine-Westphalia

Maxdata is the name of two German information technology companies.

The original Maxdata was founded in 1987 by Holger Lampatz in Marl, North Rhine-Westphalia, as Maxdata Computer GmbH. It began selling personal computers in 1990. Maxdata used its own name for B2B products while selling notebooks and displays for the customer market under the Belinea brand.

In 1997, Maxdata was majority-owned by Vobis, itself a fully owned subsidiary of the Metro AG. In 2003, the company was restructured as Maxdata AG and listed in the Prime Standard. Maxdata filed insolvency proceedings at the Local Court in Essen on Wednesday, 25 June 2008. It had 1000 employees at the time of closure. The Belinea brand was sold to Brunen IT Group while the Maxdata name was sold to S&T.

Maxdata Computer AG, a fully owned Swiss subsidiary of Maxdata AG, was taken over by Brunen IT as Belinea AG before being sold to S&T and renamed Maxdata (Schweiz) AG. In 2016, S&T stopped the production of desktop computers and notebooks.

S&T founded a new Maxdata Deutschland GmbH in 2014 in Mendig as a fully owned subsidiary but in 2016 it was renamed to S&T Deutschland GmbH.

== Products ==
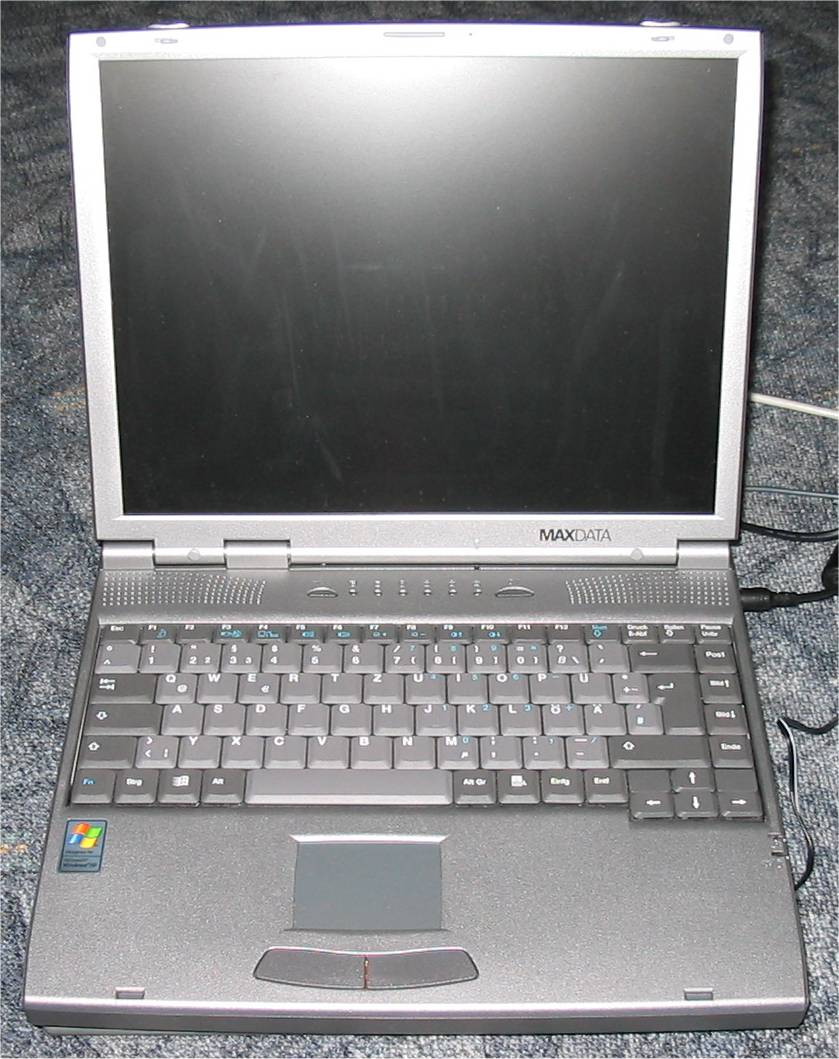
Maxdata Laptop

Its product lines included servers, desktop computers, notebooks and the Belinea series of monitors.
