= Luigi Colani =

German industrial designer (1928–2019)

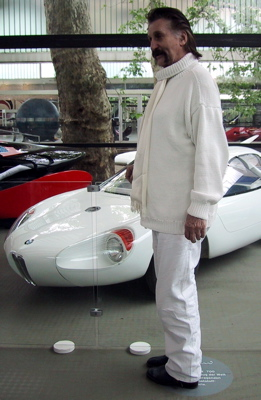
- Luigi Colani in front of his BMW 700 in the exhibition "COLANI – Das Lebenswerk" (Karlsruhe) in 2004
- Born: Lutz Colani; 2 August 1928; Berlin, Germany
- Died: 16 September 2019 (aged 91); Karlsruhe, Germany

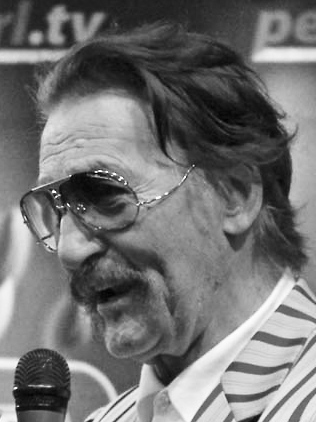
Colani in 2013 at the trade fair IFA Berlin in Germany

Luigi Colani (born Lutz Colani; 2 August 1928 – 16 September 2019) was a German industrial designer.

His long career began in the 1950s when he designed cars for companies including Fiat, Alfa Romeo, Lancia, Volkswagen, and BMW. In 1957, he dropped his first name Lutz, using the name Luigi. In the 1960s, he began designing furniture, and as of the 1970s, he expanded in numerous areas, ranging from household items such as ballpoint pens and television sets to uniforms and trucks and entire kitchens. A striking grand piano created by Colani, the Pegasus, is manufactured and sold by the Schimmel piano company.

His unconventional designs made him famous, not only in design circles, but also to the general public. He received numerous design awards, although his unconventional approach left him largely an outsider from the mainstream of industrial design.

== Early life ==
Born in Berlin, Colani was the son of a Swiss film set designer and a mother of Polish descent.

His brother Victor Colani (born 1933 in Berlin) was also a designer.

== Career ==
=== 1950–1970s ===
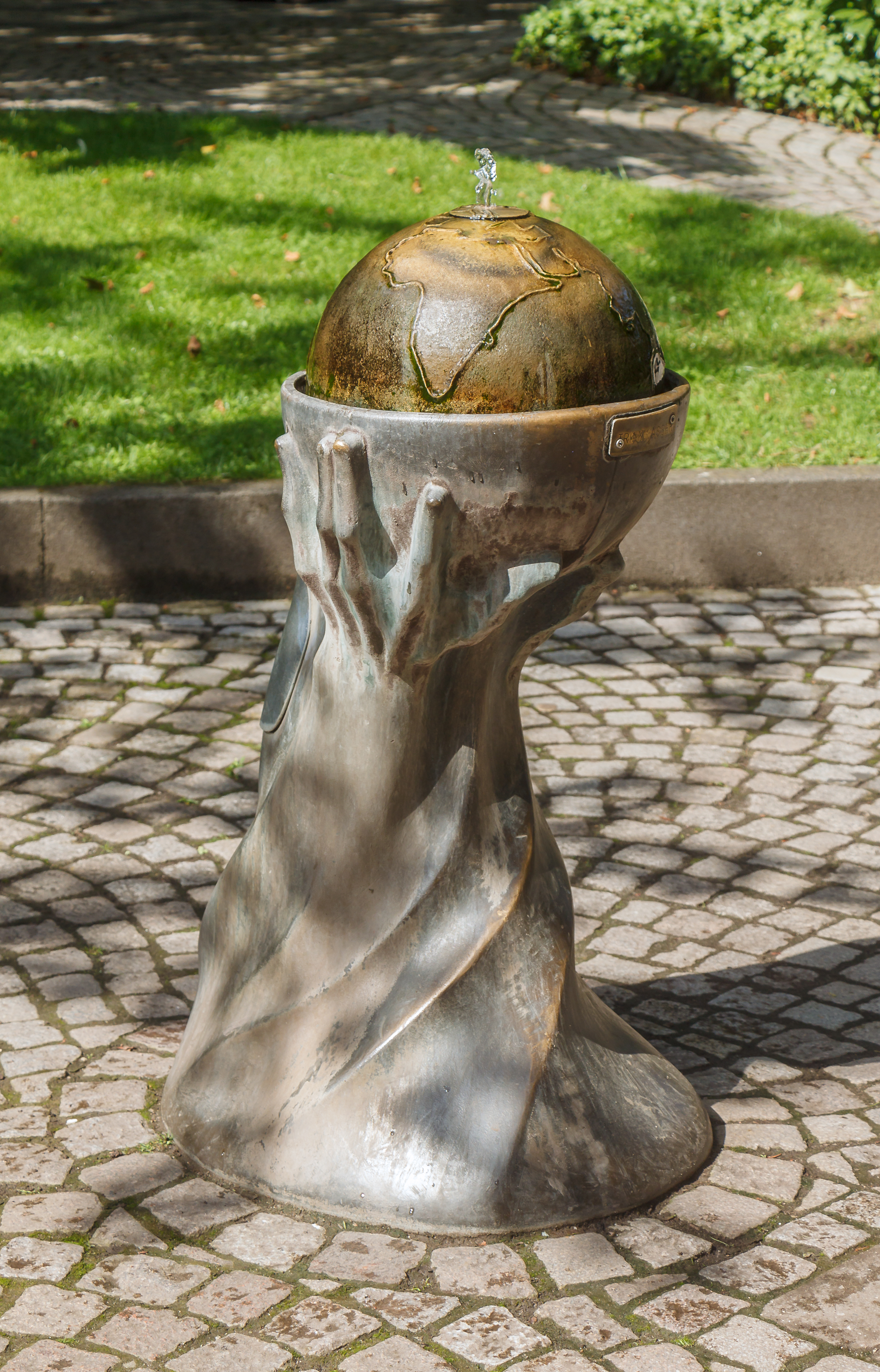
Drinking fountain - Luigi Colani, Zoologischer Stadtgarten Karlsruhe

By 1953, he was living in California where he was Head of New Materials project group at McDonnell Douglas.

Moving to auto design, in 1954, he received the Golden Rose international prize for creation and design, in Geneva, Switzerland, for special Fiat bodywork; he would be the originator of many Fiat designs in the coming years. A constant innovator, by 1958 he was also interested in sailing vessels. His catamaran design was a racing success in Hawaii.

Returning to cars, in 1963 he introduced the world's first plastic monocoque sports car, based on the BMW 700, and in 1960 the world's first kit car in series, the Colani GT, which sold 1,700 copies. In 1966 he showed his sports coupe design at the IAA in Frankfurt.

By the 1960s, his design range had also expanded to include household objects and furniture, and in 1965 he gained worldwide success with furniture designs for Asko, Fritz-Hansen (Körperform chairs), Cor, and Kusch+Co. He also rebodied an Abarth Alfa Romeo design, based on two wrecked Abarth 1000 GT Coupés in the early 1960s.

In 1968, for Thai Airways, he developed a two-piece plastic cutlery set which the Museum of Design, Zürich, added to its collection.

He had developed a sufficient reputation and income by 1970 to establish a studio with a major design team at Harkotten Castle near Sassenberg, Germany. The studio was an enormous success, with work and exhibitions worldwide for many major companies. Meanwhile, he continued with his innovations in car design, including his 1972 design of the Eifelland Formula One car.

This period saw him making his first forays into the Japanese market, when he obtained contracts from Japanese companies for the first time. In 1973, he made his first study trip to the Far East, during which Japanese buyers recognized Colani's potential. He received invitations by five companies to establish a Colani Design Center Japan.

About this time, the "Drop" teapot he designed for Rosenthal, a world leader in porcelain, was acquired for inclusion in the Cooper-Hewitt Museum in New York. In 1999, Rosenthal promoted a special edition of his now-famous design.

In 1974, Colani designed the Teeservice Zen for Melitta. It has been manufactured by the Melitta-owned porcelain manufacturer Friesland Porzellan since 1981.

Not all of his designs were successes. For example, he created an unsuccessful design for an Olympic rowboat. About this time, in the early 1970s he developed his first streamlined truck design, which he said, "was a direct response to the world oil crisis yet nobody noticed my design. They didn't get the message". He would revisit streamlined trucks later in the decade to more fanfare.

Colani's first profession as an aeronautics designer was revisited in 1976 when he was assigned the task of designing the RFB Fanliner, the first plastic sports airplane with a Wankel rotary engine. Later, in 1985, he unveiled the Pontresina propeller-driven airplane, having two contra-rotating coaxial pusher propellers with scimitar blades mounted in the tail. The propellers, also known as "centripetal supersonic propellers", were a new design idea. The plane was a design study and is not airworthy.

By 1978, his revolutionary trucks, aircraft, car and ship studies had begun to be seen frequently at exhibitions worldwide. His interest in fuel economy continued into the 1980s. In 1981, he set a fuel economy world record set with the four-seater Colani 2CV (based on the French Citroën 2CV which consumed just 1.7 litres of gasoline to travel 100 km using a stock 2CV engine and chassis.

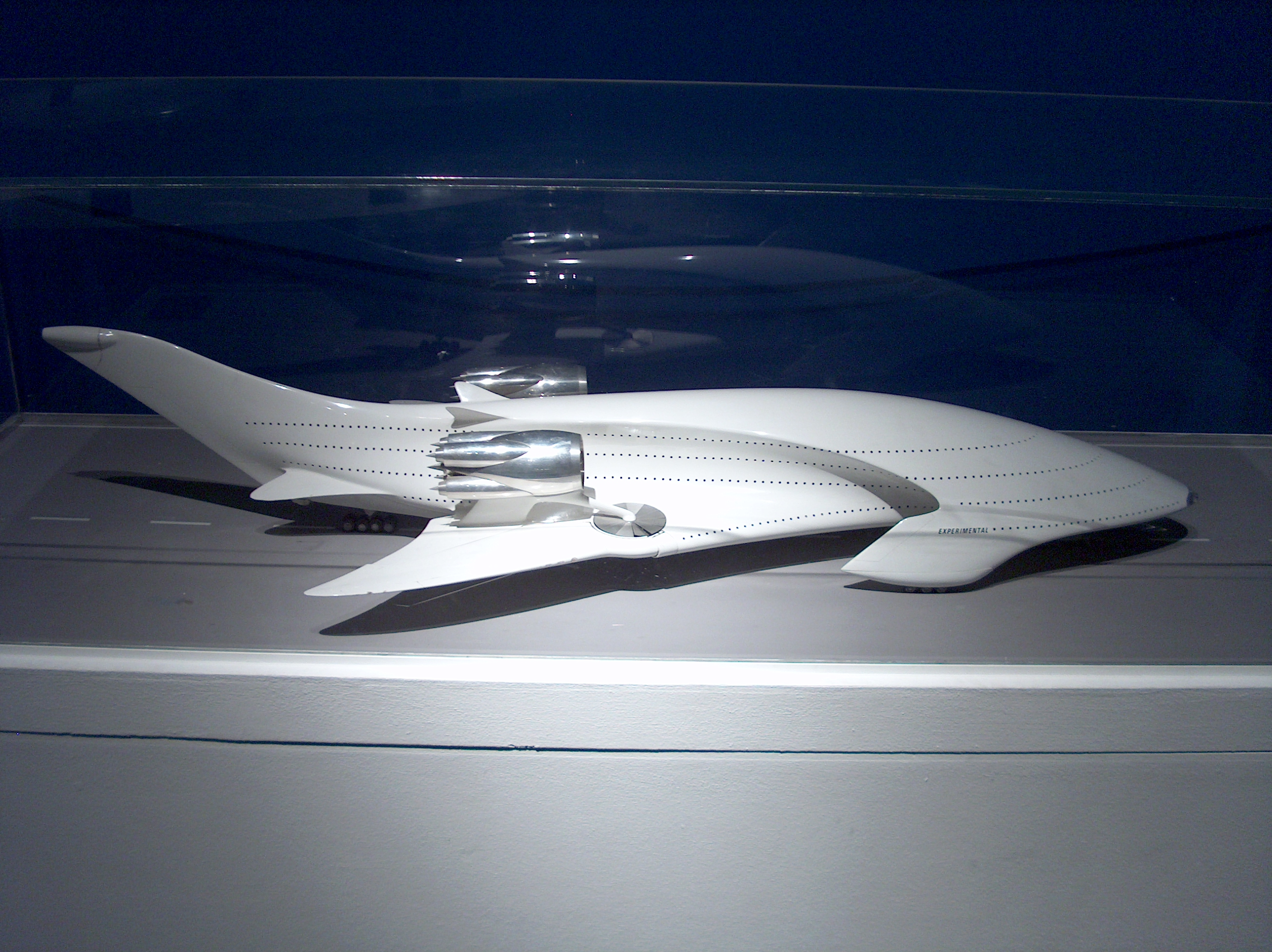
Model of a concept jet aircraft designed by Luigi Colani

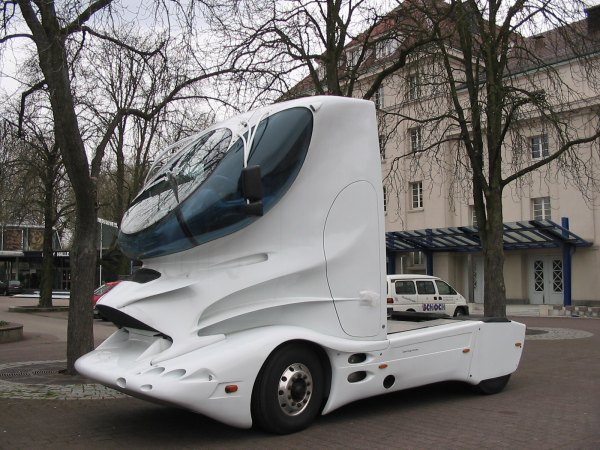
Truck prototype by Colani

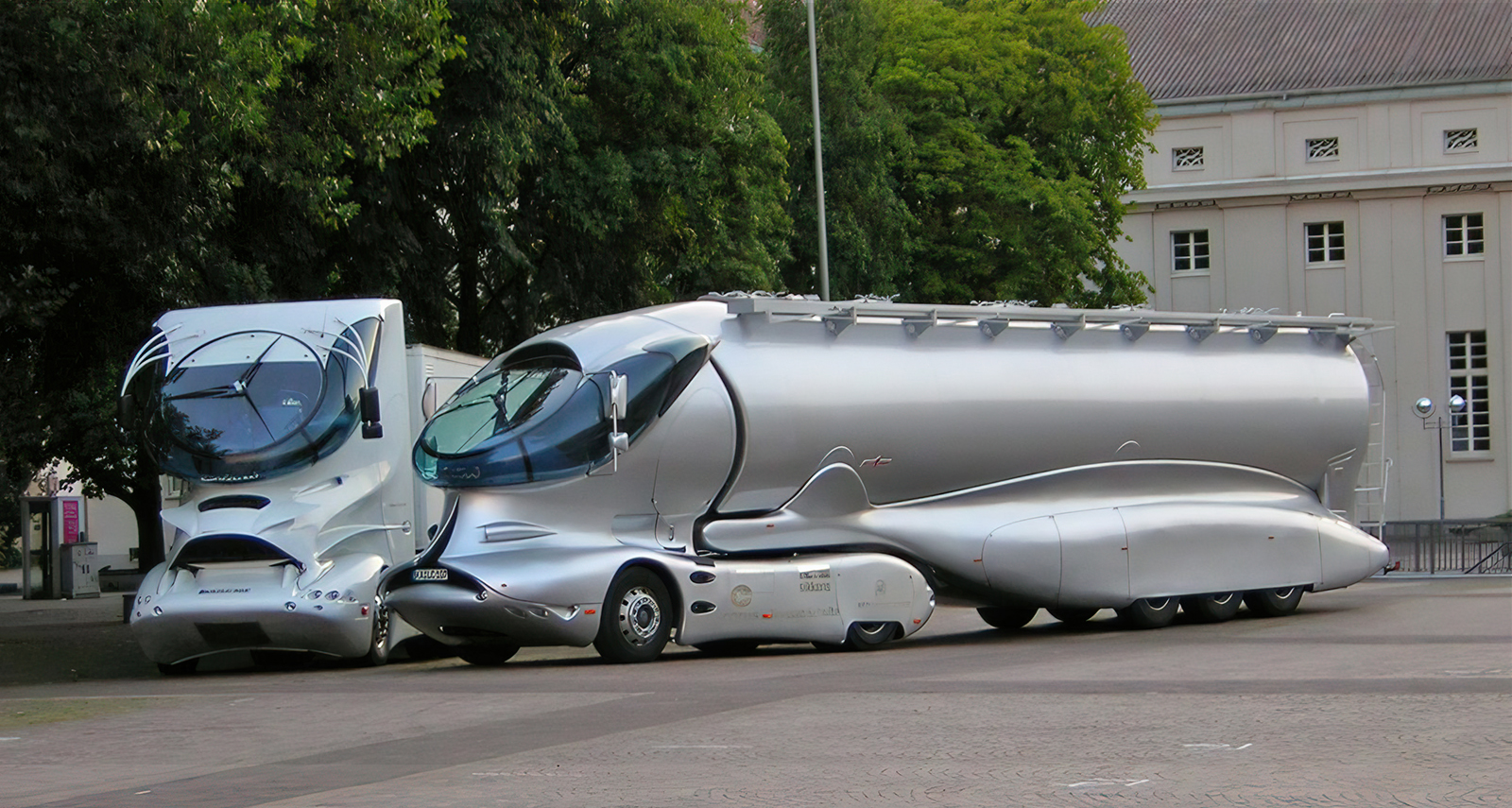
Two truck prototypes by Colani

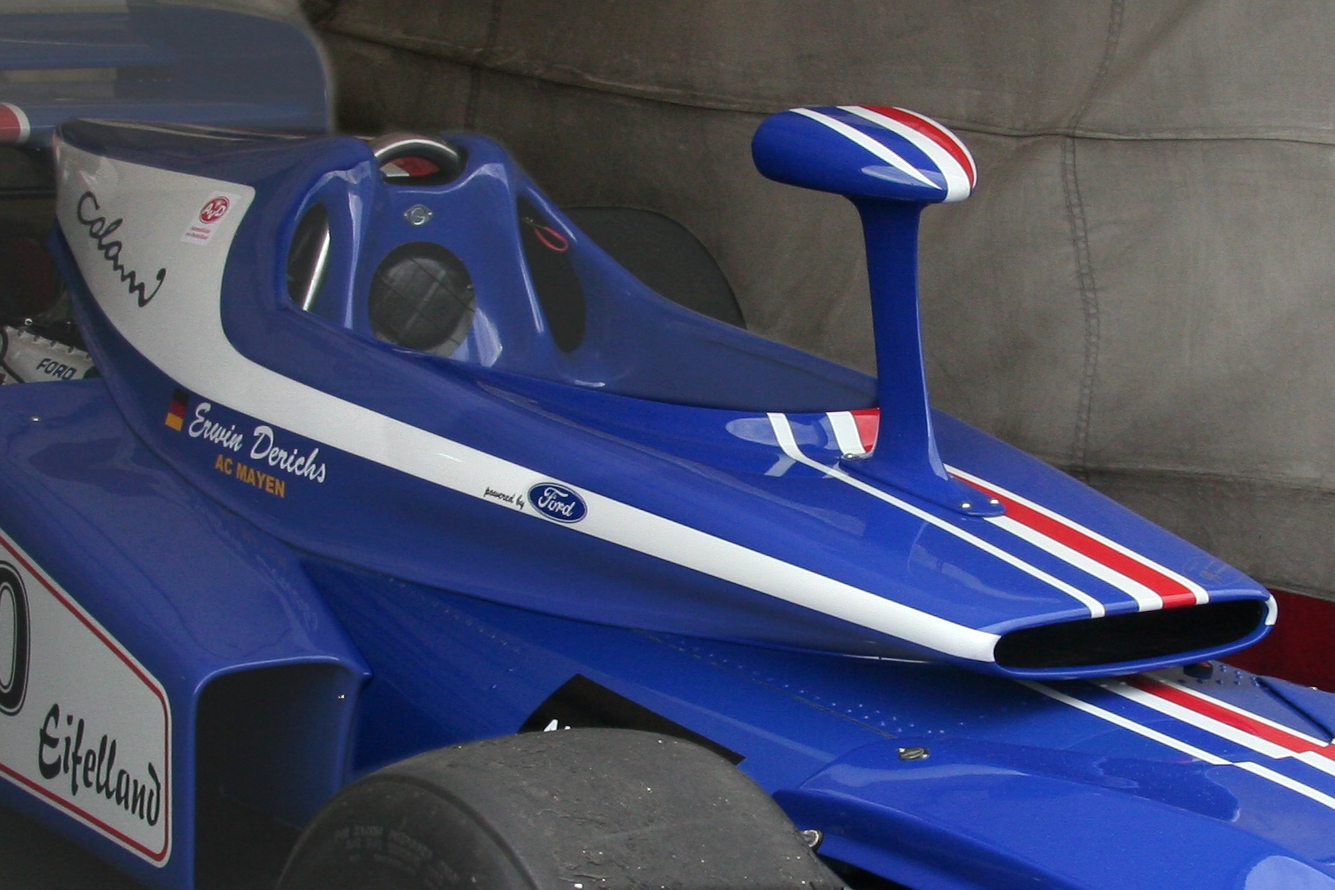
Concept Eifelland-March F1 car by Colani

=== 1980–1990s ===
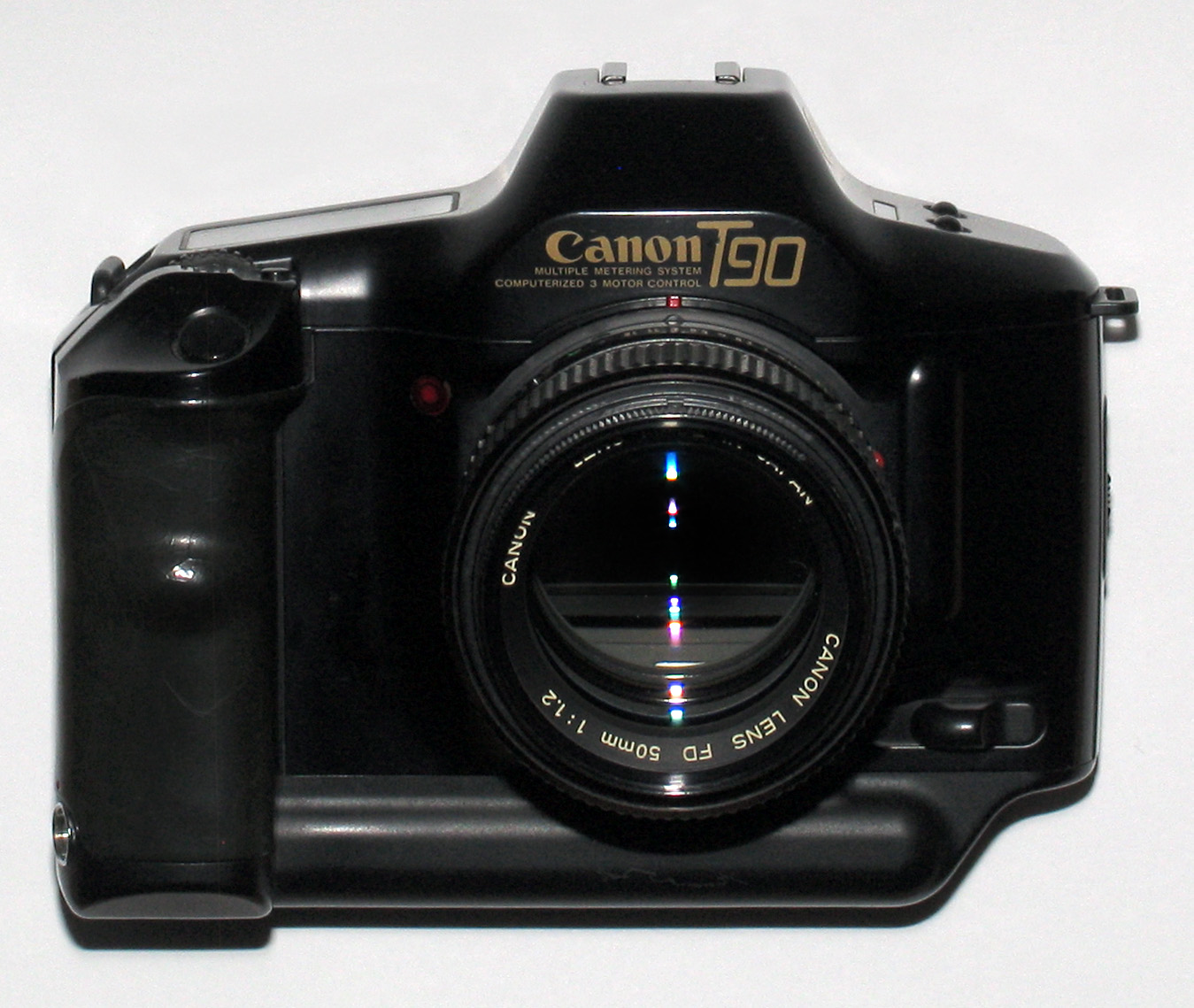
Canon T90 and 50mm f1.2, 1983

The year 1982 saw Colani relocating to Japan, where a year later he accepted a position as professor in Tokyo.

For Canon, he developed the "5 Systems" camera prototypes and in 1984, he was voted the No. 1 industrial designer in Japan at the Otaru exhibition for his 60 m large shell. In 1986, he received the Golden Camera Award for the Canon T90.

In 1985, his Robot Theater was the most-attended pavilion at Expo '85.

In 1986, one of his motorcycles set a world record in Italy. That year, he founded Colani Design Bern in Switzerland.

He continued to show his designs at international exhibitions, including a 1987 show at Centre Georges Pompidou, Paris. Car designs continued in Japan for Mazda and he did a pen design for Pelikan A.G., Germany. The Colani Cormoran aircraft design was shown in mockup at the Paris Air Show.

In 1988 he opened offices in Toulouse and Bremen. He was also appointed a professor at the University of the Arts Bremen, as he meanwhile prepared on a wide-scale basis to establish new speed records on land, water and air and economy world records in Utah. He set records in a specially designed Ferrari at Bonneville Speedway in 1991.

In 1989 he formed Colani Trading AG in Zurich, Switzerland.

In 1989, Colani organized AUTOMORROW '89 where 12 futuristic vehicles toured the U.S. from coast to coast in two trucks. Lectures and demos included at Ford in Detroit, test drivwes on the Bonneville salt flats and the Art Center of Design in Passadena.

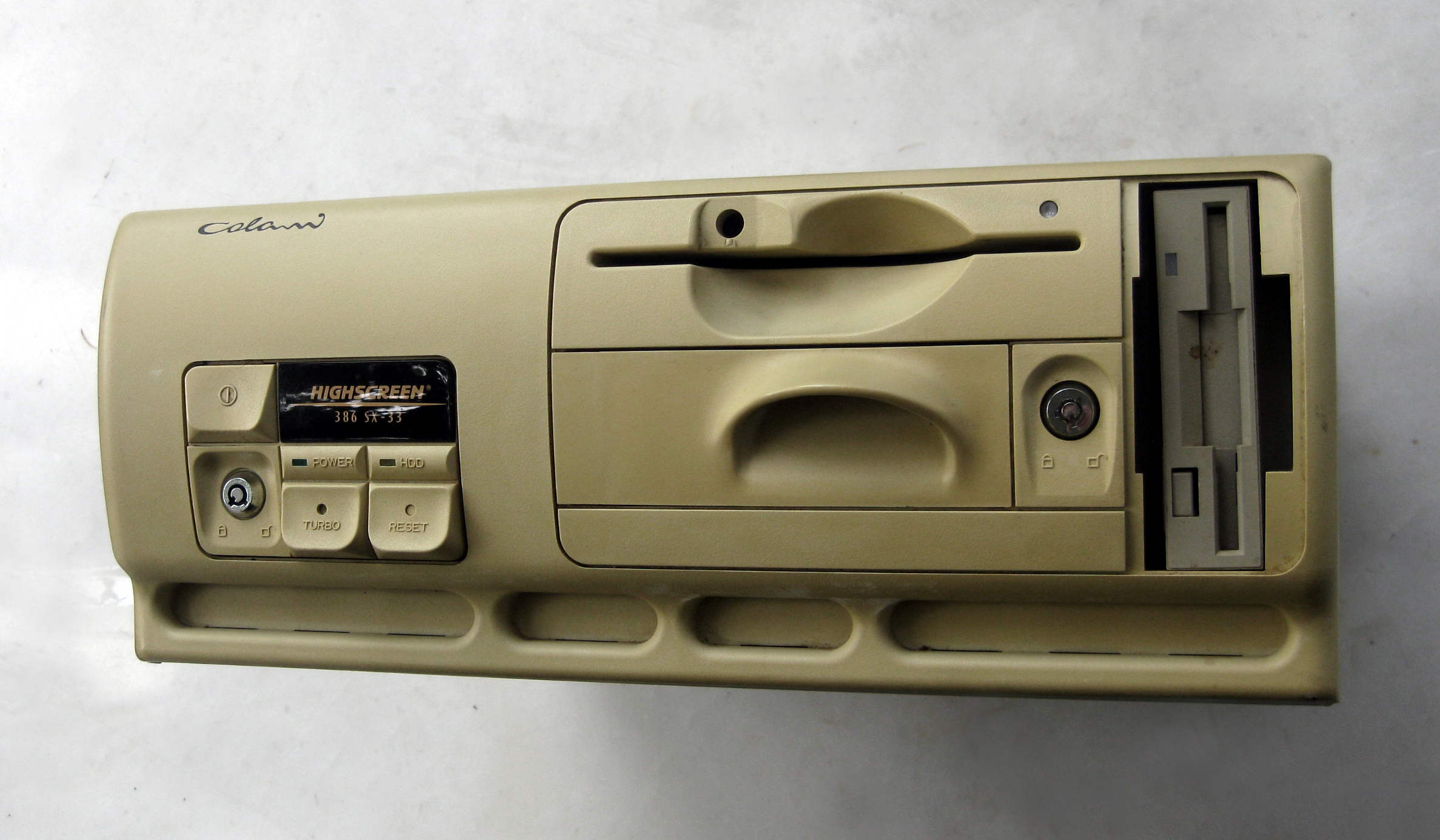
Personal Computer for Vobis

The 1990s brought more exhibitions and more designs. He mounted an exhibition at the Centre International de l'Automobile car museum in Paris and in 1993 held shopping center expositions through Switzerland.

He designed new uniforms for aircrew at Swissair, the last designs used by the airline before re-branding as Swiss in 2002. In 1991, he designed an optical frame and jewelry collection. Also in the decade, other designs included field glasses (1993); office furniture designs for Grahl, Michigan USA (1996); a new piano for famous piano builder Wilhelm Schimmel (1997); a water bottle design for Carolinen-Brunnen, Germany and a new microscope and photo camera (both 1998); and new shower (bathroom-combination)-generation for the German company Dusar and a furniture project with Kusch & Co., Germany (1999).

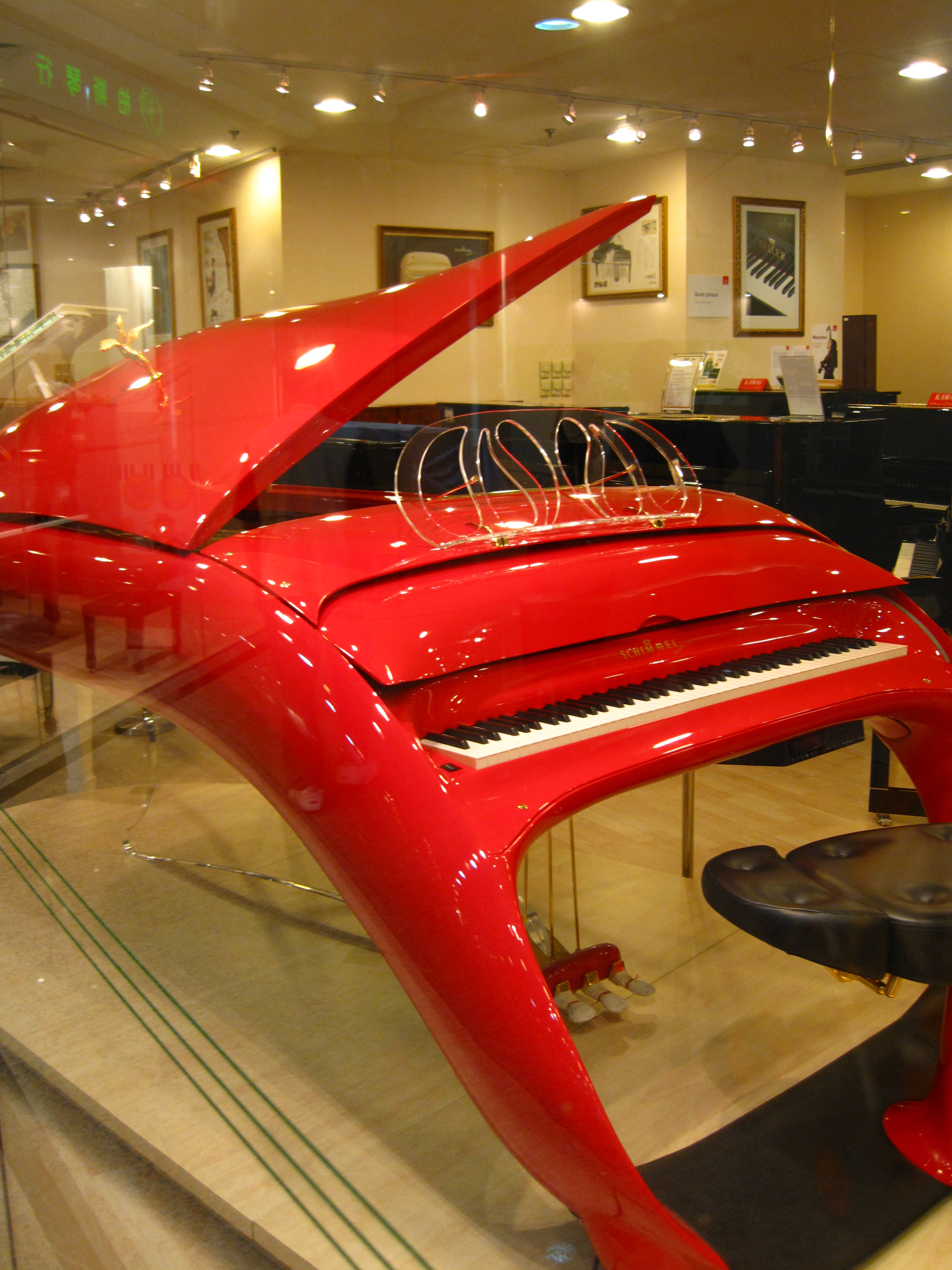
Schimmel Pegasus Piano, designed by Colani

In 1997 he designed the grand piano "Pegasus" in cooperation with the German piano manufacturer Schimmel Pianos, revolutionizing the traditional form and design of pianos. Schimmel builds no more than two of these instruments each year, and only to order. Celebrity owners of a Pegasus grand piano have included Prince, Lenny Kravitz, and Eddie Murphy.

The 1990s and 2000s (decade) also brought his share of design commissions in the field of desktop computing. Projects included a computer mouse design for Sicos (1992); the Colani Vobis Highscreen computer, awarded Computer of the Year in 1994; a bank terminal design project with one of the world's leading computer manufacturers (1998). By 1995, he had begun to branch into whole structures. that year, he completed designs for major companies in the construction and building industry. China's ambassador invited Colani for future projects to Shanghai, China. There, he was awarded an honorary professorship in the Department of Architecture, College of Architecture and Urban Planning at Tongji University. The following year, he unveiled his architecture project for Shanghai, called Bio-City.

=== 2000s ===
His architectural designs continued with the "Human-City" architecture model for MW Energie AG in Mannheim, Germany (2000) and subsequently with an experimental house design for Hanse-Haus, the German prefabricators.

He designed new optical frames presented at shows in Milan, Paris and Las Vegas and in 2001 designed a new microscope and photo camera (for Seagull) at the Colani Shanghai office. He held more than thirty exhibitions in shopping malls (ECE-group) throughout Germany. He also opened of a world-leading museum of design, Pinakothek der Moderne, in Munich, Germany which featured several Colani designs (2002).

In the realm of packaging design, he created a new bottle design for the leading Swiss mineral-water company Valser (acquired by Coca-Cola in 2002) and created porcelain giftware creations (Cappuccino, Espresso mugs).

He undertook a "Life on Board" project for Volvo cars and created a futuristic car design called the Speedster shark. He continued his large Supertruck designs with extreme streamlining, this time for Spitzer-Silo; the result was presented at the IAA in Hanover, Germany (2004).

A notable uniform commission was the 2003 re-design of police uniforms for the Hamburg Police department, which was later adopted throughout the whole of Germany.

In the years 2004 to 2007, a retrospective exhibition of Colani's work, called COLANI – Das Lebenswerk, took place in the "Nancy hall" of the congress center of Karlsruhe. The exhibition was not continued as funding of the hall's renovation was not achieved.

In 2007, the Design Museum in London showed his work in the exhibit Translating Nature.

In avionics, he designed the TT-62-Plane for hp-aircraft.de. He also completed a design study for a 1,000 seat passenger airplane (2005).

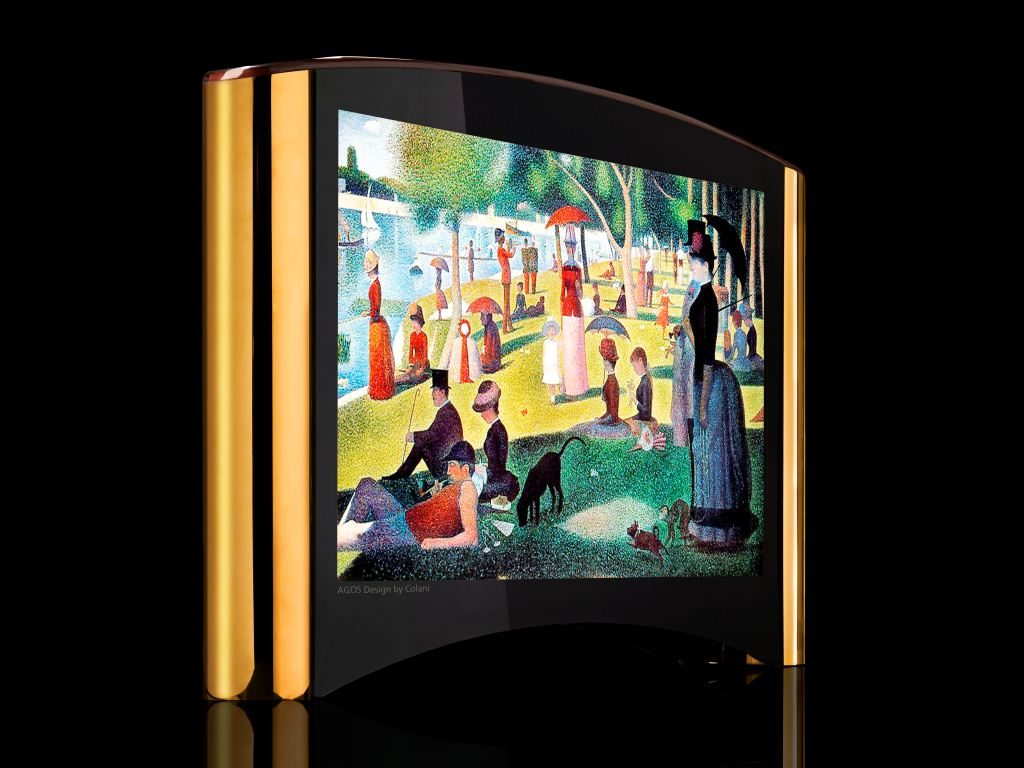
AGOS Luxury Computer Series, Opus Magnum, Design by Colani, 2014

He completed a series of 140 sculptures of athletes for the Olympic Games in Beijing. He also participated in the "Germany in Japan 2005-6" event in the form of the "Colani Back in Japan" exhibition in the Museum for Art and Design attached to the Kyoto Institute of Technology. He also carried out a study for a robot shaped like a baby.

In 2013 the first Model (AC22) of the AGOS Luxury Computer Series, Opus Magnum, was presented at the Nowa Zukunftsmesse in Marburg, Germany.

== Style ==
The prime characteristic of his designs are the rounded, organic forms, which he termed "biodynamic" and claimed are ergonomically superior to traditional designs. His "kitchen satellite" from 1969 is the most prominent example of this school of thought. Many of his designs for small appliances are being mass-produced and marketed, but his larger designs have not been built, "a whole host of futuristic concepts that will have us living in pods and driving cars so flat that leg amputation is the only option".

Colani compared his style to heavenly bodies:

The earth is round, all the heavenly bodies are round; they all move on round or elliptical orbits. This same image of circular globe-shaped mini worlds orbiting around each other follows us right down to the micro-cosmos. We are even aroused by round forms in species propagation related eroticism. Why should I join the straying mass who want to make everything angular? I am going to pursue Galileo Galilei's philosophy: my world is also round.

== Personal life ==
Colani was married to Sabine Fadia-Colani in the late 1970s. He lived together with Ya Zhen Zhao since the 1990s and resided in Shanghai, China and Karlsruhe, Germany. He has two sons. His older son Bernard (b. 1956) lives in Paris and works as a stock market analyst. His younger son Solon Luigi Colani (b. 1972) lives in Berlin where he also works as a designer and does special effects work in the movie industry.

He was a guest speaker and presenter at the 2004 World Economic Forum in Davos, Switzerland.

Colani died in Karlsruhe in 2019.
