= Vobis =

German computer hardware company

Vobis GmbH
- Formerly: Vero GmbH
- Company type: Gesellschaft mit beschränkter Haftung
- Industry: Computer
- Founded: 1975; 51 years ago in Aachen
- Founders: Theo Lieven; Rainer Fraling
- Number of employees: 1,100 (early 2000s)

Vobis GmbH (formerly Vobis AG) is a German computer hardware company and reseller of computer systems. During its tenure under Metro AG in the 1990s, it was the largest retailer of personal computers in Europe. The company also sells cell phones in Russia under the Highscreen name, a trademark used previously in the 1990s for its pan-European computer systems.

== History ==
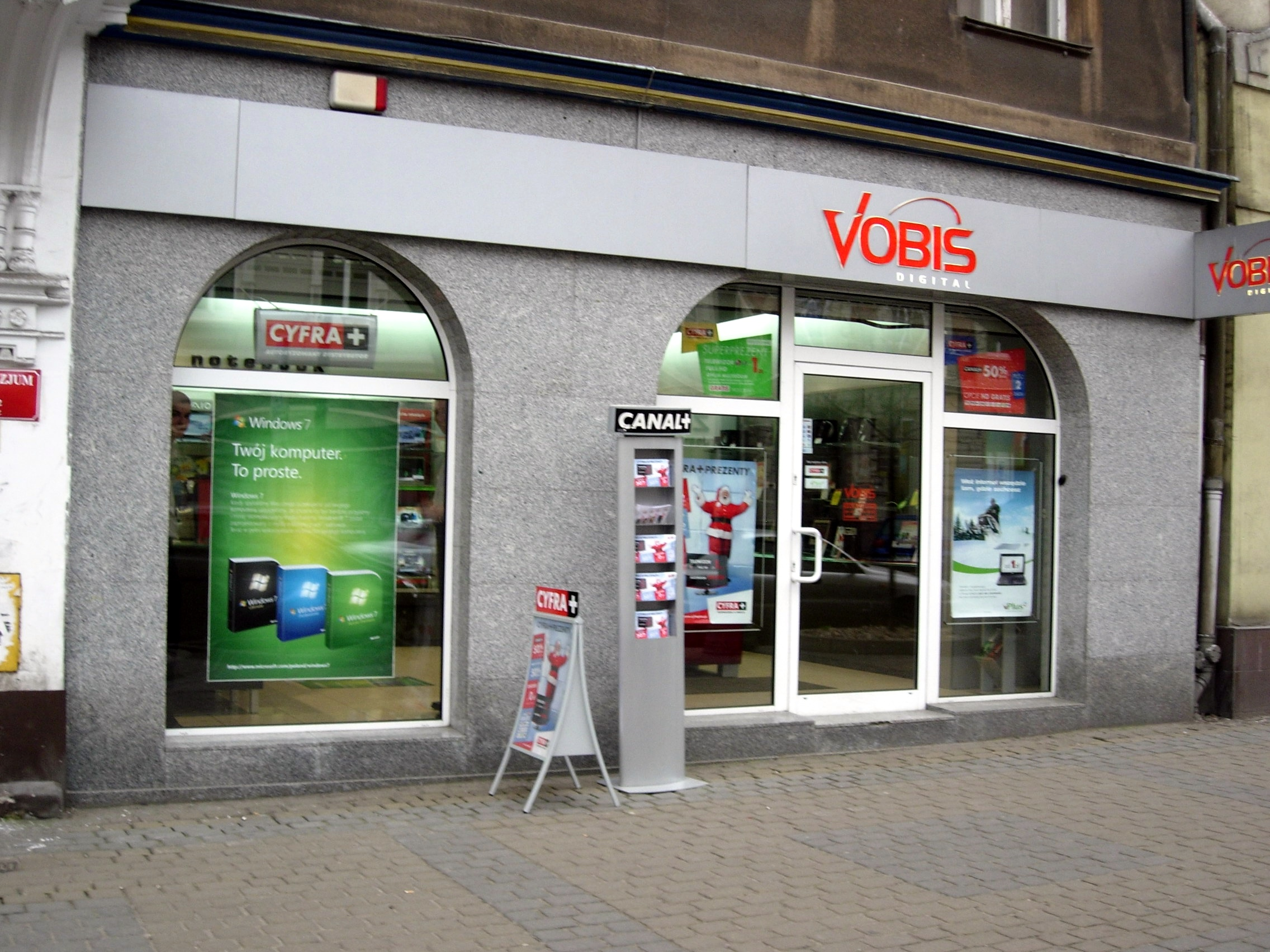
A Vobis store in Bydgoszcz, Poland, pictured in 2009

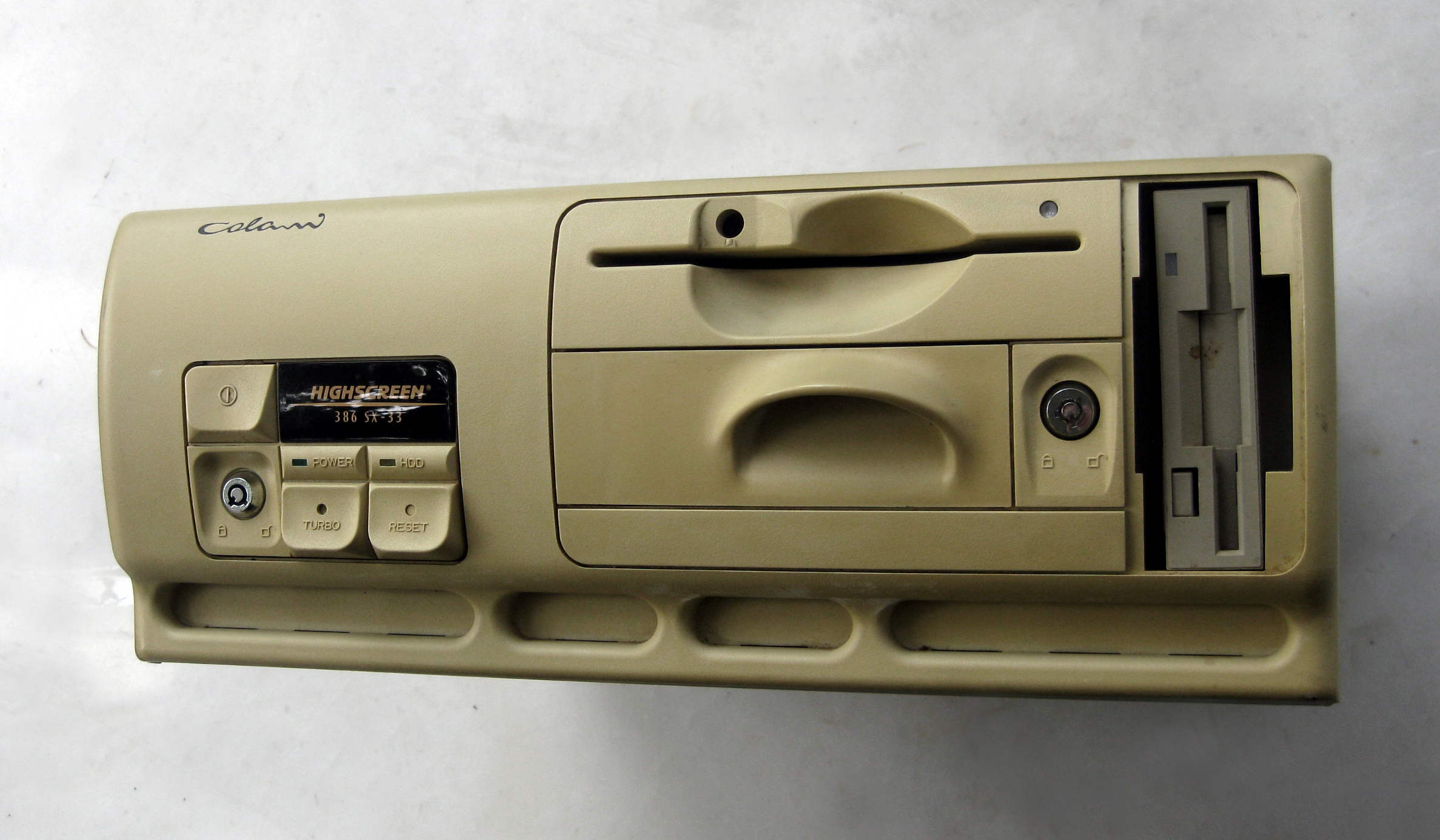
A Highscreen desktop PC, circa 1993, designed by Luigi Colani

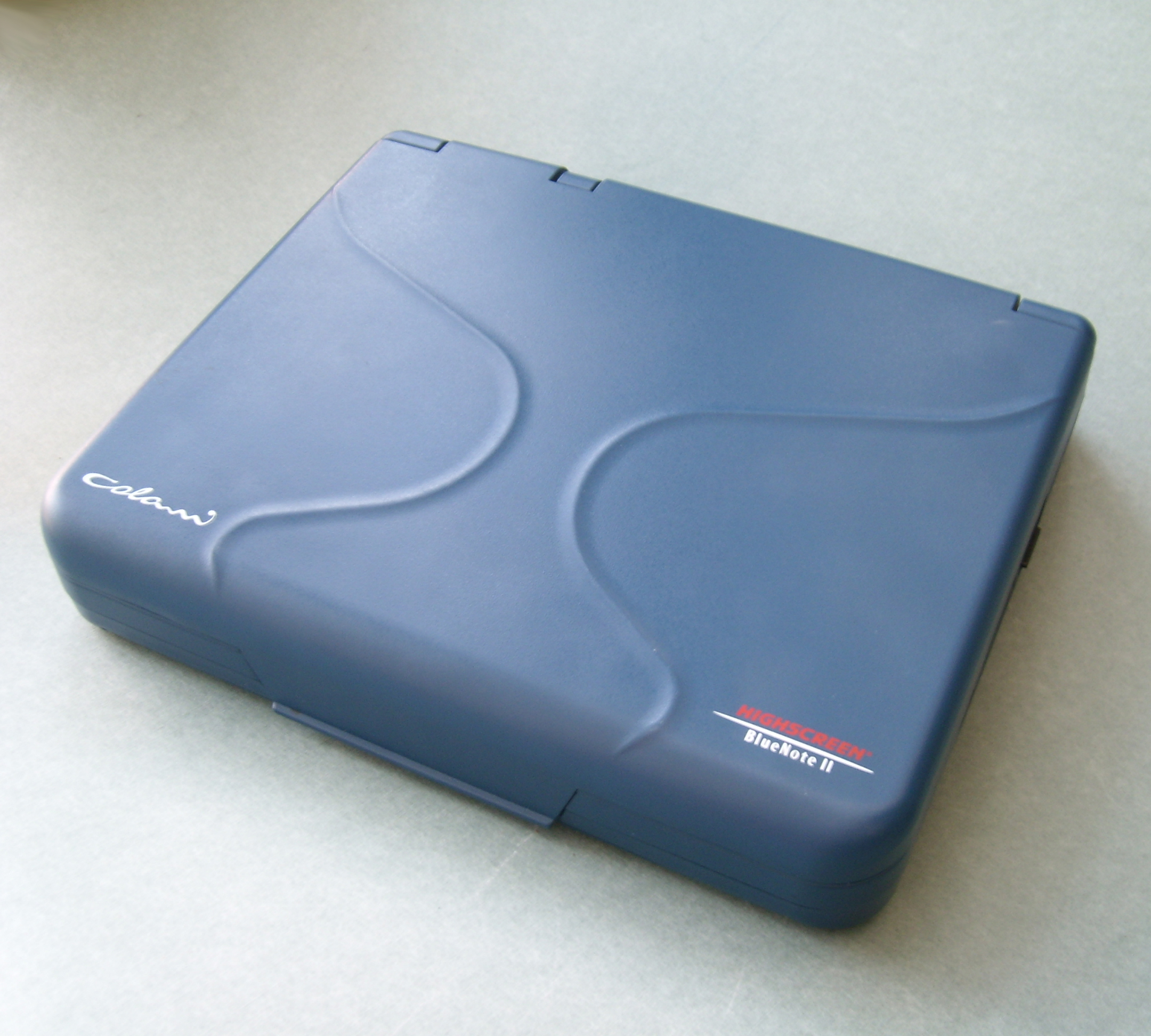
A Highscreen BlueNote II notebook PC, also designed by Colani

Vobis was founded in 1975 in Aachen as Vero GmbH by students Theo Lieven and Rainer Fraling. Both were attending RWTH Aachen University when they founded their company; they later dropped out when the company became a surprise success. Vero started as out as a division of Studienhilfe e.V., reselling study aids such as slide rules and calculators to fellow students on campus.

In 1981, the company was renamed Vobis Data Computer GmbH and expansion in Germany began. The name change marked a pivot towards providing microcomputers instead of college supplies.

In October 1989, Metro AG acquired a majority stake in the company. Shortly after, in 1991, Vobis became a public company. Vobis also expanded abroad and founded, among other divisions, branches in Austria, Poland, Belgium and France. It became Europe's largest personal computer retailer by the mid-1990s. In 1994, due to Microsoft delaying the release date of Windows 95, Vobis decided to pre-install IBM's OS/2 on all of their new PCs. This boosted OS/2's popularity in Germany; it achieved a 40 percent market share in Germany, compared to the United States' 5 percent. Microsoft tried to withdraw Vobis' license for Windows 95, which would have had serious economic ramifications for Vobis, but they later came to an agreement in 1995.

In 1997, Vobis introduced the Highscreen Alpha 5000, their first entry in the workstation market, running a DEC Alpha microprocessor. The company had heretofore produced strictly consumer machines based on the Wintel/x86 platform. In the same year, Vobis had established 776 branches in eleven countries.

Metro broke up Vobis at the beginning of 1999 by selling their manufacturing lines to Maxdata (a company in which they owned a majority stake), as well as spinning off nine of Vobis' foreign branches. The Berlin entrepreneurs Jürgen Rakow and Jürgen Bochmann together acquired a 25-percent stake, plus one share, in the remaining Vobis company; Rakow had previously operated 33 branches as a franchisee under his operating company Vobis Micro Computer Franchise-Shop GmbH (VMCFS). The Vobis company was then renamed to Vobis Microcomputer AG.

In 2003, Vobis' former parent company Metro entered into an agreement with the company to carry Vobis products into Kaufhof department stores, increasing Vobis' nationwide sales locations from 65 to 323. Shortly after, Vobis moved their headquarters from Würselen to Potsdam in 2004 as part of major restructuring. The restructuring of the group continued at the end of 2005. From then on, Vobis began trading under the name Vobis Digital Expert. The company's focus shifted from selling complete PCs to individual parts as well as software and services. After a lawsuit was filed by Expert AG, Vobis dropped the Digital Expert from their trade name.

In 2009, Vobis Microcomputer moved its headquarters from Thaleischweiler-Fröschen to Langenburg. In 2011, Bochmann and Raisin stepped down as managing directors and were succeeded by Claudia Wiedenig. In July 2014, the company merged with IT-Holding GmbH, which had also moved from Saarbrücken to Langenburg, and this in turn was merged with Divaco Beteiligungs AG, a company led by Siegfried Kaske.

At the beginning of 2008, the company had a total of 48 franchisees, down from roughly 96 in 2005. In the meantime, the company had transferred its franchise system division as well as their distribution and telecommunications subsidiaries to the investment company Sibov AG. Vobis then relocated to Potsdam. Sibov became a GmbH in 2014 and also moved its headquarters to Langenburg, becoming part of Siegfried Kaske's investment network.

Since 2009, the Highscreen brand has been used for Russia-marketed smartphones. In 2012, Vobis' online store was awarded to franchisee Bora Computer GbR. By July 2017, there were only 13 branches left of Vobis, located chiefly in Berlin and East Germany.
