= 1962 SCCA National Sports Car Championship =

Seasons
- ← 1961 1963 →

The 1962 SCCA National Sports Car Championship season was the twelfth season of the Sports Car Club of America's National Sports Car Championship. It began January 28, 1962, and ended September 22, 1962, after thirteen races.

== Schedule ==
Rnd	Race	Length^{A}	Circuit	Location	Date
1	SCCA National Race	150 km (93 mi)	Daytona International Speedway	Daytona Beach, Florida	January 28
2	SCCA National Race	68 mi (109 km)	Marlboro Motor Raceway	Upper Marlboro, Maryland	April 15
3	President's Cup	2 hours, 30 minutes	Virginia International Raceway	Danville, Virginia	April 29
4	Cumberland National Championship Sports Car Races	75 km (47 mi)	Greater Cumberland Regional Airport	Wiley Ford, West Virginia	May 13
5	SCCA National Race	90 mi (140 km)	Stuttgart Municipal Airport	Stuttgart, Arkansas	May 27
6	SCCA National Race	70 mi (110 km)	Bridgehampton Race Circuit	Bridgehampton, New York	June 3
7	International June Sprints	150 mi (240 km)	Road America	Elkhart Lake, Wisconsin	June 17
8	Lime Rock Nationals	60 km (37 mi)	Lime Rock Park	Lakeville, Connecticut	June 30
9	Lake Garnett Grand Prix	70 mi (110 km)	Lake Garnett Circuit	Garnett, Kansas	July 8
10	Meadowdale SCCA National Championships	210 km (130 mi)	Meadowdale International Raceway	Carpentersville, Illinois	August 5
11	SCCA National Races	60 mi (97 km)	Thompson International Speedway	Thompson, Connecticut	September 3
12	Road America 500	500 mi (800 km)	Road America	Elkhart Lake, Wisconsin	September 9
13	Grand Prix at Watkins Glen	100 mi (160 km)	Watkins Glen International	Watkins Glen, New York	September 22

^A Feature race

== Season results ==
Feature race overall winners in bold.

Rnd	Circuit	AP Winning Team	BP Winning Team	CM Winning Team	CP Winning Team	DM Winning Team	DP Winning Team	EM Winning Team	EP Winning Team	FM Winning Team	FP Winning Team	GM Winning Team	GP Winning Team	HM Winning Team	HP Winning Team	Results
Rnd	Circuit	AP Winning Driver(s)	BP Winning Driver(s)	CM Winning Driver(s)	CP Winning Driver(s)	DM Winning Driver(s)	DP Winning Driver(s)	EM Winning Driver(s)	EP Winning Driver(s)	FM Winning Driver(s)	FP Winning Driver(s)	GM Winning Driver(s)	GP Winning Driver(s)	HM Winning Driver(s)	HP Winning Driver(s)	Results
1	Daytona	#77 Ferrari	#25 Chevrolet	**#5 Maserati-Ferrari**	Daimler	no entries	Alfa Romeo	#14 Porsche	Elva	#42 Porsche	D.B.	Elva	Alfa Romeo	Osca	Berkeley	Results
1	Daytona	(United States) Doug Thiem	(United States) Ralph Salyer	**(United States) Alan Connell**	(United States) Duncan Black	no entries	(United States) Bob Richardson	(United States) Bob Holbert	(United States) Jay Signore	(United States) Joseph Hoppen	(United States) Howard Hanna	(United States) Curt Gonstead	(United States) Bob Durren	(United States) George Peck	(United States) Hugh Kleinpeter	Results
2	Marlboro	#90 Ferrari	#1 Chevrolet	#18 Maserati	Lotus	**#6 Cooper**	Porsche	#14 Porsche	Elva	#29 Porsche	Turner	#2 Lola	#20 Alfa Romeo	Lotus	Fiat-Abarth	Results
2	Marlboro	(United States) Bob Grossman	(United States) Don Yenko	(United States) Charlie Kolb	(United States) Horace Pettit	**(United States) Roger Penske**	(United States) Bert Everett	(United States) Bob Holbert	(United States) Jay Signore	(United States) Bob Bucher	(United States) Skip Barber	(United States) M. R. J. Wyllie	(United States) Jack Crusoe	(United States) Glenn Baldwin	(United States) Ed Hessert	Results
3	VIR	#11 Chevrolet	#12 Chevrolet	^{A}	#37 Lotus	**#6 Cooper**	#27 Alfa Romeo	#14 Porsche	#44 Triumph	#29 Porsche	#74 Sports Car Forum	#37 Lola	#21 Alfa Romeo	#39 Osca	#5 Fiat-Abarth	Results
3	VIR	(United States) Dick Thompson	(United States) Don Yenko	^{A}	(United States) Dave Clark	**(United States) Roger Penske**	(United States) Eric Mangelsen	(United States) Bob Holbert	(United States) Bob Tullius	(United States) Bob Bucher	(United States) Don Sesslar	(United States) Art Tweedale	(United States) Jack Crusoe	(United States) John Gordon	(United States) Ed Astri	Results
4	Cumberland	#11 Grady Davis	#15 Ralph C. Salyer	#56 E. E. Hobbs, Jr.	#6 Dave Clark	**#6 John M. Wyatt**	#55 Herbert E. Everett	#14 Robert Holbert	#80 Jay Signore	#199 Herb Swan	#40 Skip Barber	#2 M. R. J. Wyllie	#46 Lynn Blanchard	#70 John Holmes	#119 Edmund C. Hessert	Results
4	Cumberland	(United States) Dick Thompson	(United States) Ralph Salyer	(United States) E. Hobbs, Jr.	(United States) Dave Clark	**(United States) Roger Penske**	(United States) Bert Everett	(United States) Bob Holbert	(United States) Jay Signore	(United States) Herb Swan	(United States) Skip Barber	(United States) M. R. J. Wyllie	(United States) Lynn Blanchard	(United States) John Holmes	(United States) Ed Hessert	Results
5	Stuttgart	Chevrolet	Chevrolet	no entries	Daimler	**Cooper**	Porsche	no entries	Triumph	Porsche	D.B.	Lola	Alfa Romeo	Lotus	Austin-Healey	Results
5	Stuttgart	(United States) Dick Thompson	(United States) Don Yenko	no entries	(United States) Eugene Clements	**(United States) Hap Sharp**	(United States) Tommy Allen	no entries	(United States) Bob Tullius	(United States) Harry Washburn	(United States) Howard Hanna	(United States) M. R. J. Wyllie	(United States) Lynn Blanchard	(United States) Glenn Baldwin	(United States) Bill Stone	Results
6	Bridgehampton	Chevrolet	Chevrolet	**#60 Briggs Cunningham**	Lotus	^{B}	Porsche	Bob Donner	Morgan	Porsche	Sports Car Forum	Elva	Alfa Romeo	Lola-Osca	Austin-Healey	Results
6	Bridgehampton	(United States) Dick Thompson	(United States) Don Yenko	**(United States) Walt Hansgen**	(United States) Dave Clark	^{B}	(United States) Bill Romig	(United States) Bob Donner	(United States) Arch McNeill	(United States) David Schiff	(United States) Don Sesslar	(United States) Frank Baptista	(United States) Howard Brown	(United States) John Holmes	(United States) Rod Harmon	Results
7	Road America	#11 Grady Davis	#1 Grady Davis	**#10 Chaparral Cars**	#28 Ledwith & Edwards	#95 Hap Sharp	#73 Eric Mangelsen	#7 Bob Donner	#88 Jay Signore	#77 William Wuesthoff	#61 Ferril M. Miller	#76 Ollie Schmidt	#35 Alfa Romeo	#98 Martin W. Tanner	#15 Edward Astri	Results
7	Road America	(United States) Dick Thompson	(United States) Don Yenko	(United States) Jim Hall	(United States) Pete Ledwith	(United States) Hap Sharp	(United States) Eric Mangelsen	(United States) Bob Donner	(United States) Jay Signore	(United States) Bill Wuesthoff	(United States) Shorty Miller	(United States) James Scott	(United States) Howard Brown	(United States) Martin Tanner	(United States) Ed Astri	Results
8	Lime Rock	#16 Allan Wyllie	#77 Porsche	^{C}	#7 Lotus	**#6 Cooper**	#55 Porsche	#14 Porsche	#94 Morgan	#11 Kelso Auto Dynamics	#48 Turner	#6 De Tomaso-Osca	#1 Alfa Romeo	#76 Lola-Osca	#12 Austin-Healey	Results
8	Lime Rock	(United States) Gerry Georgi	(United States) Bruce Jennings	^{C}	(United States) Dave Clark	**(United States) Roger Penske**	(United States) Bert Everett	(United States) Bob Holbert	(United States) Arch McNeill	(United States) Paul Richards	(United States) Skip Barber	(United States) James Scott	(United States) Chris Noyes	(United States) John Holmes	(United States) Harvey Glass	Results
9	Lake Garnett	#11 Chevrolet	#1 Chevrolet	#2 Meister Brauser	#44 A.C.-Bristol	**#5 Cooper**	#72 Alfa Romeo	^{D}	#53 Triumph	#161 Porsche	#37 D.B.	#76 De Tomaso-Osca	#361 Alfa Romeo	#98 Martin T	#64 Fiat-Abarth	Results
9	Lake Garnett	(United States) Dick Thompson	(United States) Don Yenko	(United States) Harry Heuer	(United States) R. E. L. Hayes	**(United States) Alan Connell**	(United States) Eric Mangelsen	^{D}	(United States) John Goans	(United States) Ed Haussermann	(United States) Howard Hanna	(United States) James Scott	(United States) Lynn Blanchard	(United States) Martin Tanner	(United States) Bruce Larson	Results
10	Meadowdale	#11 Chevrolet	#25 Chevrolet	**#1 Meister Brauser**	#7 Lotus	#94 Wayne Burnett	#13 Alfa Romeo	#17 Ferrari	#92 Triumph	#77 Concours Motors	#33 MG	#2 Lola-Climax	#4 Alfa Romeo	#93 Lotus	#64 Fiat-Abarth	Results
10	Meadowdale	(United States) Dick Thompson	(United States) Ralph Salyer	**(United States) Harry Heuer**	(United States) Dave Clark	(United States) Wayne Burnett	(United States) Sheldon Brown	(United States) Owen Coon	(United States) Bruce Kellner	(United States) Bill Wuesthoff	(United States) Chuck Cantwell	(United States) M. R. J. Wyllie	(United States) Jim Kaser	(United States) Glenn Baldwin	(United States) Bruce Larson	Results
11	Thompson	#16 Ferrari	#77 Porsche	^{E}	#6 Lotus	no entries	#55 Porsche	**#14 Porsche**	#44 Triumph	#7 Porsche	#22 Porsche	#2 Lola-Climax	#11 Austin-Healey	#95 Osca	#48 Austin-Healey	Results
11	Thompson	(United States) Gerry Georgi	(United States) Bruce Jennings	^{E}	(United States) Dave Clark	no entries	(United States) Bert Everett	**(United States) Bob Holbert**	(United States) Bob Tullius	(United States) Joe Buzzetta	(United States) Will Daugherty	(United States) M. R. J. Wyllie	(United States) Rod Harmon	(United States) John Igleheart	(United States) Brad Picard	Results
12	Road America	#8 Doug Thiem	#1 Don Yenko	**#4 Jim Hall-Hap Sharp**	#47 Ernie Harris	#41 Dean Causey	#1 Chuck Stoddard	#7 Bob Donner	#44 Bob Tullius	#66 E. L. Hall	#38 Chuck Cantwell	#37 L. E. Page	#36 Lynn Blanchard	#98 Martin Tanner	#2 Bob Anderson	Results
12	Road America	(United States) Doug Thiem	(United States) Don Yenko	**(United States) Jim Hall** **(United States) Hap Sharp**	(United States) Ernie Harris	(United States) Dean Causey (United States) Dave Causey	(United States) Chuck Stoddard	(United States) Bob Donner (United States) Don Sessler	(United States) Bob Tullius	(United States) Lee Hall (United States) Glenn Carroll	(United States) Chuck Cantwell	(United States) Art Tweedale (United States) Frank Baptista	(United States) Lynn Blanchard	(United States) Martin Tanner	(United States) Bob Anderson	Results
13	Watkins Glen	#11 Grady Davis	#1 Grady Davis	**#61 Briggs Cunningham**	#7 Lotus	#6 Cooper	#23 Austin-Healy	#9 Maserati	#44 Triumph	#78 Porsche	#37 D.B.	#76 De Tomaso-Osca	#6 Alfa Romeo	#95 Osca	#22 Fiat-Abarth	Results
13	Watkins Glen	(United States) Dick Thompson	(United States) Don Yenko	**(United States) Walt Hansgen**	(United States) Dave Clark	(United States) Hap Sharp	(United States) Robert Priebe	(United States) Conrad Kraus	(United States) Bob Tullius	(United States) Millard Ripley	(United States) Howard Hanna	(United States) James Scott	(United States) Jack Crusoe	(United States) John Igleheart	(United States) Ed Hessert	Results

^A C and D Modified were classified together at VIR; the combined class was won by Roger Penske in a DM-class Cooper Monaco. The highest-finishing CM car was John Todd's Warwick GT350-Buick in 3rd.
^B D Modified were classified with C Modified at Bridgehampton.
^C C and D Modified were classified together at Lime Rock; the combined class was won by Roger Penske in a DM-class Cooper Monaco. The highest-finishing CM car was Bob Colombosian's Buick-Mustang in 2nd.
^D E Modified were classified with D Modified at Lake Garnett.
^E C, D, and E Modified were classified together at Thompson; the combined class was won by Bob Holbert in an EM-class Porsche 718 RS 61. There were no DM cars; the highest-finishing CM car was Don Adams' Lister-Jaguar in 2nd.

== Champions ==
Class	Driver	Car
A Production	(United States) Dick Thompson	Chevrolet Corvette 327
B Production	(United States) Don Yenko	Chevrolet Corvette 283
C Modified	(United States) Harry Heuer	Chaparral 1-Chevrolet, Scarab Mk II
C Production	(United States) Dave Clark	Lotus Super Seven
D Modified	(United States) Roger Penske	Cooper Monaco T61-Maserati
D Production	(United States) Bert Everett	Porsche 356 1600 Super
E Modified	(United States) Bob Holbert	Porsche 718 RS 61
E Production	(United States) Bob Tullius	Triumph TR3, TR4
F Modified	(United States) Joe Buzzetta	Porsche 718 RSK
F Production	(United States) Howard Hanna	DB HBR5
G Modified	(United States) M. R. J. Wyllie	Lola Mk1-Climax
G Production	(United States) Lynn Blanchard	Alfa Romeo Giulietta
H Modified	(United States) Glenn Baldwin	Lotus 17
H Production	(United States) Ed Astri	Fiat-Abarth Allemano, 750
