= 1963 VIR National Cup =

Track map of VIR

The 1963 VIR National Cup was a sports car race held April 28, 1963, at Virginia International Raceway. It was the second event of the thirteenth season of the Sports Car Club of America's National Sports Car Championship.

== Results ==
Cars were separated into fourteen classes based on engine displacement and production numbers. The first race; for cars in F, G, and H Production and H Modified; was won by Jack Crusoe in an F Production Alfa Romeo Giulietta. The second race; for cars in C, D, and E Production; was won by Paul Richards in a C Production Fiat-Abarth 1000. The third race; for G Modified, Formula Junior, and Formula Three cars; was won by Charlie Hayes in a Formula Junior Elva.

=== Race Four: C & E Modified, A & B Production ===
Pos	Class	No	Team	Drivers	Car	Laps
1	CM	26	Meister Brauser Racing	Don Devine	Scarab Mk. II-Chevrolet	38
2	CM	25	Meister Brauser Racing	Harry Heuer	Chaparral 1	38
3	EM	43		Skip Barber	Lotus 23	
4	CM	11	Grady Davis	Ed Lowther	Chevrolet Corvette Grand Sport	
5	EM	75		Joe Buzzetta	Porsche 718 RSK	
6	AP	10		Dick Thompson	Chevrolet Corvette Sting Ray	
7	AP	33		Bob Johnson	Shelby Cobra 289	
8	AP	9	Grady Davis	Duncan Black	Chevrolet Corvette Sting Ray	
9	BP	12	Grady Davis	Don Yenko	Chevrolet Corvette	
10	AP	1		Bob Holbert	Shelby Cobra 289	
11	AP	49		Roy Kumnick	Chevrolet Corvette	
12	EM	57		Charles Kurtz	Porsche 718 RS 61	
13	BP	51		Bob Mouat	Chevrolet Corvette	
14	AP	6		Frank Dominianni	Chevrolet Corvette	
15	AP	8		Ben Moore	Chevrolet Corvette Sting Ray	
16	BP	83		Bob Sinn	Chevrolet Corvette	
17 DNF	AP	85		Dick Lang	Chevrolet Corvette Sting Ray	
18 DNF	EM	3		Chuck Stoddard	Porsche	
19 DNF	AP	15		A. W. Joslin	Chevrolet Corvette Sting Ray	
20 DNF	BP	14		Stefan Szwarce	Porsche 356 Carrera	
21 DNF	AP	59		Pierre Mion	Ferrari 250 GT Berlinetta	
22 DNF	BP	23		Ed Smith	Chevrolet Corvette	
23 DNF	CM	28		Bud Gates	Apache	
24 DNF	BP	0		Guenter Genatowski	Mercedes-Benz 300 SL	
25 DNF	BP	64		Ray Houchins	Lotus Super 7	
