= Abarth 1000 GT Coupé =

1000 GT Coupé
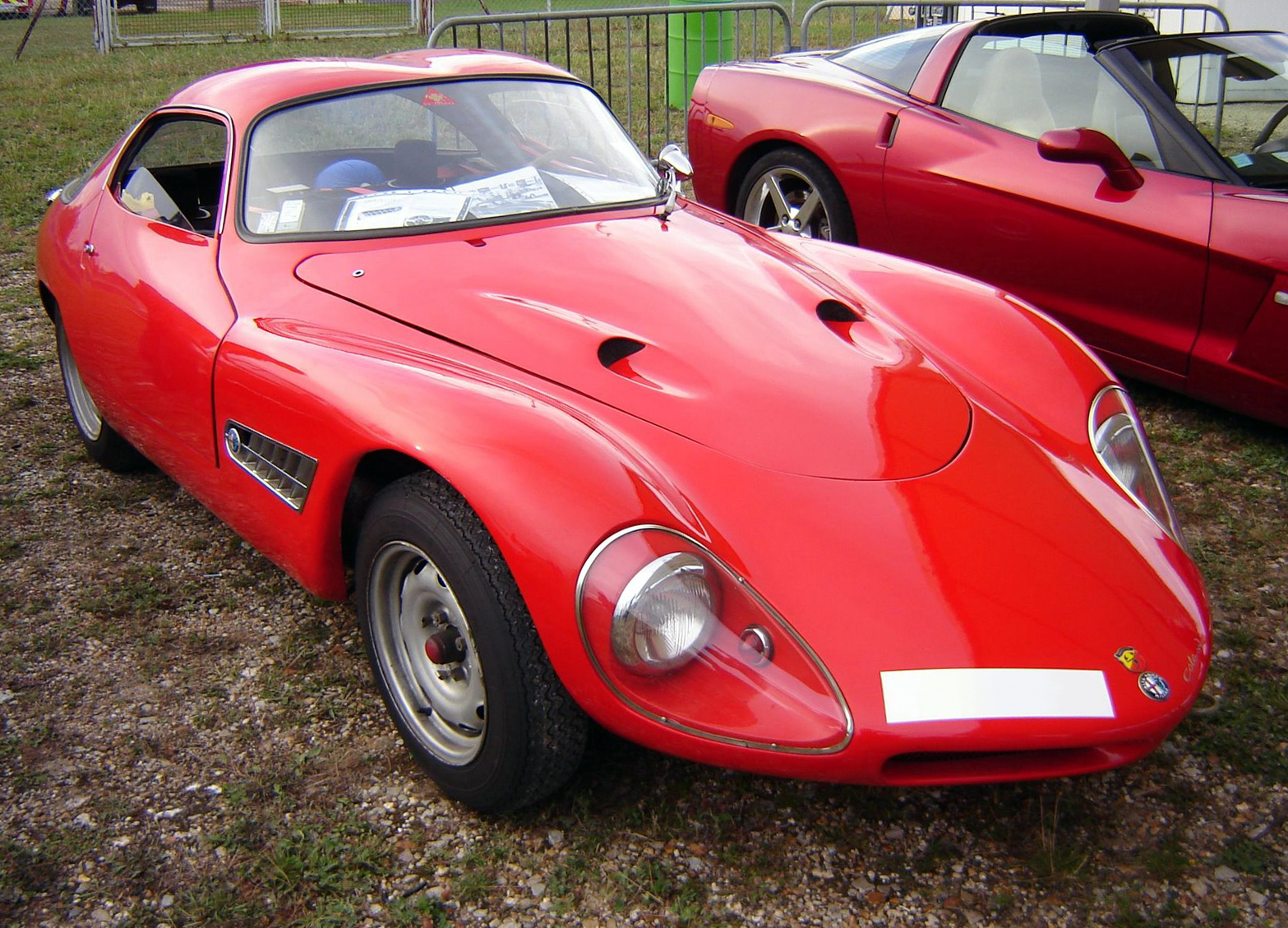
- As rebodied by Luigi Colani

Overview
- Manufacturer: Abarth
- Production: 1958
- Designer: Franco Scaglione at Bertone

Body and chassis
- Body style: 2-door coupé

Powertrain
- Engine: 998 cc Twin Cam I4
- Transmission: 5-speed manual

Dimensions
- Wheelbase: 2,160 mm (85 in)
- Length: 3,690 mm (145 in)
- Width: 1,550 mm (61 in)
- Height: 1,200 mm (47 in)
- Kerb weight: 640 kg (1,410 lb)

The Abarth 1000 GT Coupé or Alfa Romeo 1000 Abarth GT Bertone Coupé is a prototype car made by the Italian car producer Abarth in collaboration with Alfa Romeo, and designed by Franco Scaglione for Bertone. Three cars were built; one example survives, rebodied by Luigi Colani.

== Overview ==
The cars were built in 1958, and was fitted with Alfa Romeo's 1.0-litre straight engine with double overhead camshafts with a power output of 88 PS (65 kW; 87 hp). The engine was a short-stroke version of the Alfa Romeo Giulietta's 1.3 litre engine, developed so as to enable it to compete in racing categories restricted to engines of less than one litre. The stroke was reduced to 58.0 mm (2.28 in) while the bore remained 74.0 mm (2.91 in). The tubular chassis reportedly only weighed 50 kg (110 lb), and the car was fitted with a fully synchronized five-speed "System Porsche" transmission. The modest engine was offset by the kerb weight of just 640 kg (1,411 lb).

Only three were built, and after at least two of them were crashed while testing at AVUS in Germany the project was abandoned.

== Rebodied by Colani ==
Young designer Luigi Colani bought the wrecked cars and pieced together a fibreglass-bodied design of his own, which still exists although it is currently powered by a 1.3 litre Giulietta Veloce engine.

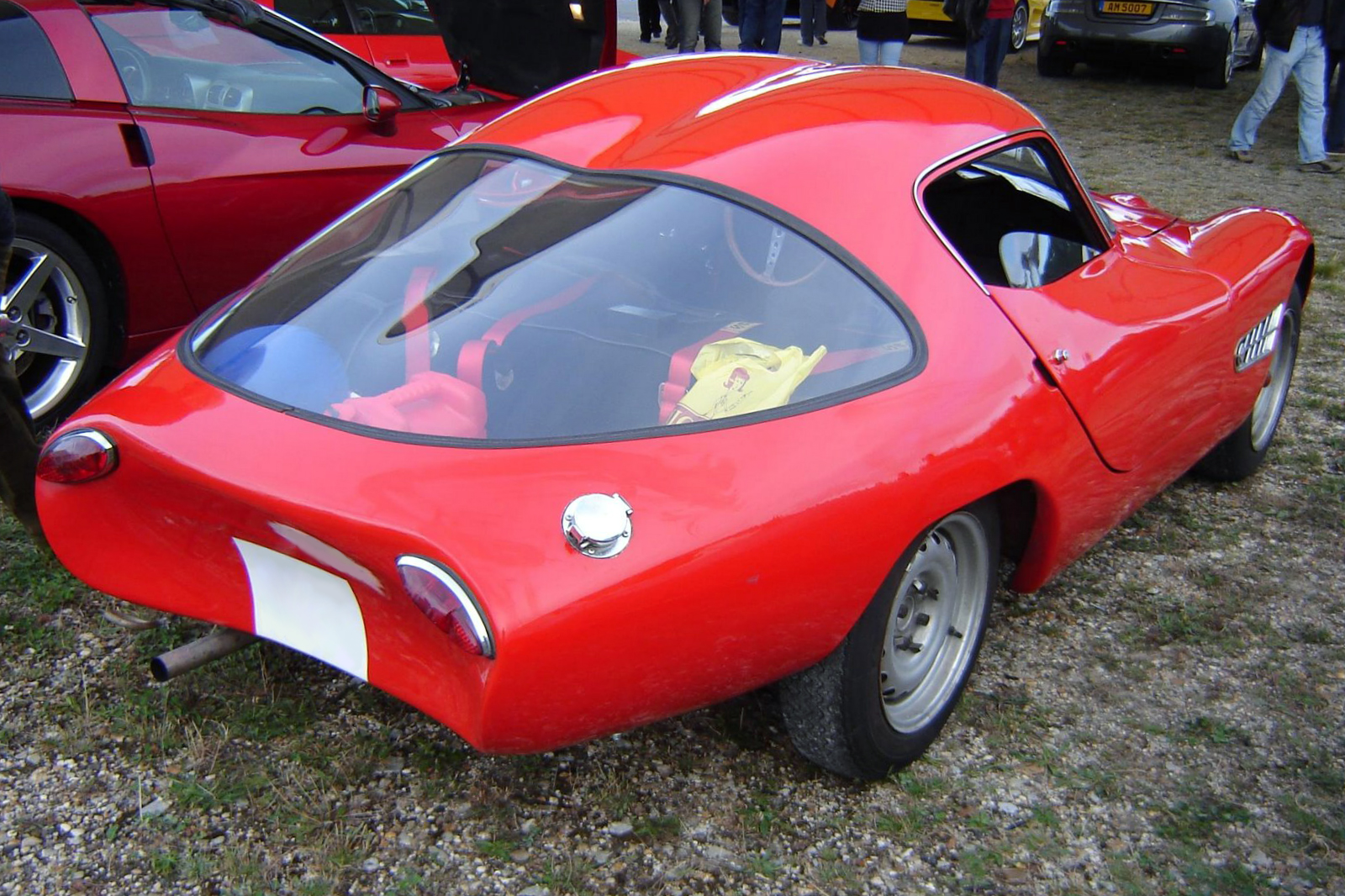
Rear view of rebodied Abarth-Alfa Romeo 1000
