= 1963 Cumberland National Championship Sports Car Races =

The May 12, 1963, race at Cumberland, Maryland Raceway was the third racing event of the thirteenth season of the Sports Car Club of America's National Sports Car Championship.

A&B Production Results

Div.	Finish	Driver	Car Model	Car #
AP	1st	Bob Johnson	Shelby Cobra	33
AP	2d	Dick Lang	Corvette Sting Ray	85
AP	3rd	Dick Thompson	Corvette Sting Ray	
BP	1st	Robert Mouat	Corvette	57
