= 1963 June Sprints =

The June 22, 1963 race at Road America, at Elkhart Lake, WI was the sixth racing event of the thirteenth season of the Sports Car Club of America's National Sports Car Championship.

A&B Production Results

| Div. | Finish | Driver | Car Model | Car # |
|---|---|---|---|---|
| AP | 1st | Bob Johnson | Shelby Cobra 289 | |
| AP | 2d | Bob Brown | Shelby Cobra 289 | |
| AP | 3rd | Dick Thompson | Corvette Sting Ray | |
| AP | 4th | Grady Davis | Corvette Sting Ray | |
| AP | 5th | Roy Kumnick | Corvette Sting Ray | |
| BP | 1st | Ed Smith | Corvette | |
