= Donna Mae Mims =

- Nationality: American
- Born: July 1, 1927
- Died: October 6, 2009 (aged 82)
- Debut season: 1960

Awards
- 1963: SCCA National Championship Runoffs H Production Champion

Donna Mae Mims (July 1, 1927 – October 6, 2009) was an American race car driver. She was the first woman to win a Sports Car Club of America (SCCA) national championship. Mims won the SCCA Class H championship in 1963. She was known as the "Pink Lady" of racing because she wore a pink racing helmet and coveralls and had the phrase "Think Pink" emblazoned on the back of her pink racing cars. Mims also competed in the third running of the Cannonball Run race in November 1972.

== Biography ==
=== Early years ===
Mims graduated from Dormont High School in Dormont, Pennsylvania, in 1945. In the 1950s, Mims worked as an executive secretary at Yenko Chevrolet in Canonsburg, Pennsylvania.

=== Automobile racing ===
She and her husband purchased a fuel-injected Corvette and developed an interest in automobile racing. The Yenko dealership had a division involved in automobile racing, and in 1960, Mims started racing cars with friends from Yenko. She quickly became one of the top amateur race car drivers in the country. She won her first race in 1960, driving her Corvette at the B Production race at the Cumberland National.

Mims became a regular participant in the Cumberland National Sports Car Classic in the 1960s. She finished second to Frank Nagle of Wyomissing, Pennsylvania, in the Lions Club Trophy race at the Cumberland Municipal Airport in 1963.

In 1963, Mims won the Sports Car Club of America national racing championship driving a pink Austin-Healey 1959 Bugeye Sprite that once had belonged to Dr. Jonas Salk. She won the 1963 Class H championship after competing in ten sanctioned races in her Austin Healey Sprite. She placed first in two of the ten races, placed second three times. In the twenty-year history of the Sports Car Club of America to that point, Mims was the first woman to win a national racing championship.

Mims became known as the "Pink Lady", because most of the automobiles in which she raced were painted pink. Her cars included the pink Austin-Healey in which she won the championship and a pink Corvette, Corvair, Triumph TR3 and MGB. In 2009, Mims told the Pittsburgh Post-Gazette, "On the back of most of my cars I had 'Think Pink' ... I liked pink ever since I was a little girl." In 1964, the UPI ran a feature story on Mims, noting that the "Pink Lady" not only drove a pink car, but wore a pink helmet and pink coveralls. The feature story continued:

"It's easy to see why men chase after Donna Mae Mims. She's a delightful blonde with an intriguing smile, well-shaped figure and a laughing sense of humor. And much like most other members of her sex, she delights in leading men a merry chase. Only trouble is, Donna Mae doesn't want to get caught. For it's a double life Donna Mae leads, and when she isn't sitting at a secretary's desk she's pursuing her career as 'the pink lady of racing.'"

Mims continued to race automobiles for 12 years. In 1969, Los Angeles Times columnist Jack Smith wrote a column about Mims when she visited the Los Angeles auto show. Mims described her pre-race rituals to Smith:

"I psych myself. I remove all my makeup. I think stern. I bristle. I don't talk to anybody. You cannot think nice. Chivalry is dead on the racetrack. You're out there only for one thing. To win. Nobody remembers second place."

Mims told another reporter, "A lot of the male drivers think I'm out there to prove that I can beat them because they're men. That isn't so. They claim that I sometimes charge into the corners, cutting them off. I don't mean to. I'm just trying to win."

=== Cannonball Run ===
In November 1972, Mims participated in the third running of the official Cannonball Baker Sea-to-Shining-Sea Memorial Trophy Dash, an illegal road race better known as the "Cannonball Run" from the East Coast of the United States to the Pacific Ocean in Southern California. Mims was part of an all-female team in the Cannonball Run with teammates Judy Stropus and Peggy Niemcek. The women were sponsored by "The Right Bra", drove a 1968 Cadillac limousine, and wore tight-fitting shirts and pants and no bras. Mims later recalled being pulled over during the famous race:

"Most memorable is the ticketing event in the wee dark hours as we were pulled over by a Barney Fife look-a-like who claimed he'd been chasing us for 15 minutes at 115 miles per hour. No bribe could corrupt this pure-hearted Don Knotts, and we were doomed to follow him to the magistrate."

Mims and her teammates did not finish the race, as their vehicle was totaled when one of the other drivers lost control of the vehicle in the middle of the night and crashed near El Paso, Texas. The car overturned, and green fluid from the porta-pottie covered everything. Mims was portrayed by actress Adrienne Barbeau in the 1981 film about the race, The Cannonball Run.

After a 14-year racing career, Mims volunteered with the SCCA, working for many years at the starting grids at races including the Pittsburgh Vintage Grand Prix and Championship Runoffs.

=== Death and funeral ===
Mims died on October 6, 2009, of complications from a stroke. She requested that her body be seated in the driver's seat of a 1979 pink Chevrolet Corvette for visitation at her funeral. Some 60 Corvettes were expected to participate in her funeral procession.

== Racing record ==
=== SCCA National Championship Runoffs ===
Year	Track	Car	Engine	Class	Finish	Start	Status
1963		Austin-Healey Sprite	BMC	H Production	1		Running
