= 1963 Bridgehampton SCCA National Race =

The June 2, 1963, race at Bridgehampton Long Island International Speedway was the fourth racing event of the thirteenth season of the Sports Car Club of America's National Sports Car Championship.

A&B Production Results

Div.	Finish	Driver	Car Model	Car #
AP	1st	Bob Johnson	Shelby Cobra	33
AP	2d	Dick Thompson	Corvette Sting Ray	
AP	3rd	Bob Brown	Shelby Cobra	
BP	1st	Robert Mouat	Corvette	
CP	1st	Paul Richards	Fiat-Abarth	
