= Pete Hylton =

Pete Hylton (born January 30, 1957) was the archivist and historian for the Sports Car Club of America . He is the author of four books: Ghost Tracks: A Historical Look at America’s Lost Road Racing Tracks, Sports Car Club of America 60 Years in Photos, More Ghost Tracks: A Historical Look at More of America's Lost Road Racing Tracks, and The Gentlemen's Club: The Growth and Transition of American Sports Car Racing.

He was also the founding Director of the Motorsports Engineering Program for the Purdue University School of Engineering and Technology at Indiana University - Purdue University at Indianapolis (IUPUI), where he led teams of university students in running several race teams while training for careers in the motorsports industry. These included wins in the annual Purdue Grand Prix collegiate go-kart race, as well as wins in Sports Car Club of America (SCCA) competition, and being the first collegiate team to achieve an invitation to the SCCA national Championship Runoffs in 2009.

His combined efforts in these two areas led to his being awarded the SCCA's highest honor, the Woolf Barnato Award (2006) as well as admission into the SCCA Hall of Fame (2014).

== Engineering ==
Hylton graduated summa cum laude in 1979 from Rose-Hulman Institute of Technology in Terre Haute, Indiana with a Bachelor of Science in Mechanical Engineering. After graduation, he went to work as a test engineer for General Motors Alison Gas Turbines in Indianapolis. He earned his M.S.M.E. on a General Motors Graduate Fellowship at Purdue University in West Lafayette, Indiana. After completing his graduate education, Hylton continued his career with Alison (which was bought out by Rolls-Royce) until 2003.

== Academic ==
Hylton joined Indiana University Purdue University Indianapolis in 2003 as an Associate member of the faculty of the MET Department of the Purdue School of Engineering and Technology at IUPUI. He became an associate professor in 2004, directing the department's Motorsports Technology program. In 2007, he earned his second graduate degree, a M.S. Applied and Industrial Mathematics from IUPUI. He led IUPUI's Motorsports program to include a four year Motorsports Engineering degree and Masters Degree. In the process he earned a Doctorate in Education from Grand Canyon University in 2013, and was appointed a full professor at IUPUI in 2016. He was named a Fulbright Scholar in 2015 and spent a year at the University of Lancaster in England. Following that, he took the post of Lecturer and Programme Leader for the Engineering programmes at the University of Highlands and Islands (UHI) in Scotland. At both universities he was involved in STEM (Science, Engineering, Technology and Math) engagement activities for students in high school and below. He is the author of over 30 published journal and conference papers, many co-authored with his wife, Wendy Otoupal-Hylton who holds BS and MS degrees in mathematics.

== Amateur Racing ==
A competition driver for 25 years, Hylton has been active in the Sports Car Club of America since 1973, winning several amateur regional and divisional championships. In January, 2007, he received the SCCA's highest honor, the Woolf Barnato Award, for his service to the organization. In 2014 he was inducted into the SCCA Hall of Fame. Hylton was on the SCCA board of directors for three terms.

After retiring from his position on the board, he took on the responsibility of volunteer historian and archivist for the organization. Since 1996, he has collected and organized publications, photos, racing statistics and artifacts. Hylton is a contributing writer for SportsCar, the magazine published by the SCCA.

== Family life ==
Born in Indianapolis, he and his wife Wendy live in Brownsburg, Indiana where they raised their three daughters. They also maintain a home in Thurso, Scotland since beginning teaching for UHI. From 2007 to 2016, they ran The Old MG Bed and Breakfast. in the converted Grandison Eaton house, which was built in the 1860s and is one of Hendricks County's historic buildings.

== Books & Published Articles ==
- Ghost Tracks: A Historical Look at America’s Lost Road Racing Tracks (2007)
- Sports Car Club of America 60 Years in Photos (2004)
- More Ghost Tracks: A Historical Look at More of America's Lost Road Racing Tracks,
- The Gentlemen's Club: The Growth and Transition of American Sports Car Racing.
- List of published academic articles
- Numerous articles in the SCCA's monthly magazine, SportsCar.
