= 1963 Meadowdale SCCA National Championships =

The August 4, 1963 race at Meadowdale International Raceway was the eighth racing event of the thirteenth season of the Sports Car Club of America's National Sports Car Championship.
A&B Production Results

Div.	Finish	Driver	Car Model	Car #
AP	1st	Bob Brown	Shelby Cobra	
AP	2d	Roy Kumnick	Corvette Sting Ray	
AP	3rd	Ralpha Salyer	Corvette Sting Ray	
BP	1st	Don Yenko	Corvette	
