= 1963 Lime Rock SCCA National Race =

The June 14–15, 1963 race at Lime Rock Park was the fifth racing event of the thirteenth season of the Sports Car Club of America's National Sports Car Championship. Held under the auspices of the SCCA's New England Region, the event started on Friday with two races, and after an overnight rain which left the unpaved paddock looking like a lake, the racing concluded on Saturday, as there was an injunction forbidding Sunday racing at the venue which continues to the present day. In addition to the classes listed below, individual races were also held for a Formula cars, won by Arch McNeill in his Lotus 18 Formula Jr #18 (on Friday afternoon), and a race for the Modified cars on Saturday, won by Peter Sachs in his FM Lotus 23 #37, with second place and first in CM (upclassed, as there were no other DM or EM cars) taken by Joe Buzzetta's #7 "Bosch Special" Porsche. M.R.J. "Doc" Wyllie took GM in his ubiquitous #7 Lola, Chuck Dietrich 2nd in GM with the #88 Bobsy, with GM honorable mention in 3rd going to local resident and motorsports legend John Fitch in a BMC #45.

Production Class Results

Cl.	Finish	Driver	Car Model	Car #
AP	1st	Bob Brown	Shelby Cobra	41
BP	1st	Don Yenko	Corvette	1
CP	1st	Gaston Andrey	Morgan	25
DP	1st	Bob Tullius	Triumph	77
EP	1st	Bill Romig	Porsche	12
FP	1st	Jack Crusoe	Alfa	7
	2nd	Tom Flaherty	Alfa	45
	3rd	Art Riley	Volvo P1800	1
GP	1st	Rod Harmon	A-H Sprite	1
HP	1st	Paul Hill	A-H Sprite	1
