= Mid-America Raceway =

Motorsports Park in Missouri

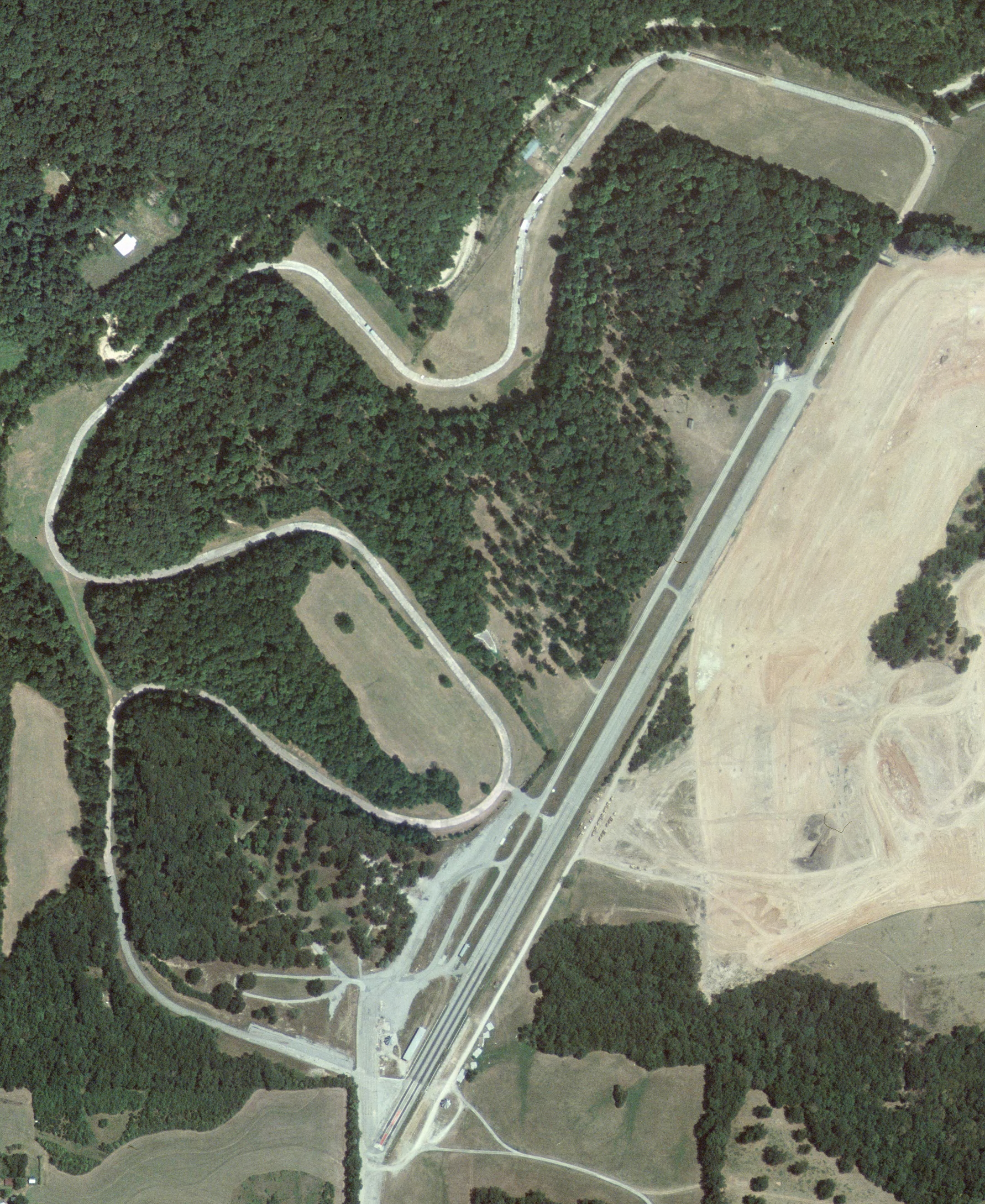
- 2005 aerial photo
- Location: Wentzville, Missouri
- Coordinates: 38°50′47.07″N 90°54′38.36″W
- Capacity: open seating without capacity limitation
- Opened: 1964
- Closed: 2004
- Major events: Former: SCCA (1964–1970); IMSA GT Championship (1975, 1977); Trans-Am Series (1966)

Full Circuit (1964–1992)
- Length: 4.603 km (2.860 mi)
- Turns: 11
- Race lap record: 1:48.500 ( (United States) Carl Shafer, Chevrolet Camaro, 1977, IMSA GTO)

Mid-America Raceway was a road racing circuit and dragstrip, located in Wentzville, Missouri, near St. Louis, built in 1964, and used until 1992. It hosted various SCCA races, as well as Trans-Am and IMSA GT races. After the circuit was no longer being used, the 1,200 foot portion that doubled as a drag strip continued to be used until October 31st, 2004. In 2005 it was sold to a developer, after facing years of hostility from the neighboring homes that had built on property adjoining the race track.

== Lap records ==
The fastest official race lap records at Mid-America Raceway are listed as:

Category	Time	Driver	Vehicle	Event
Full Circuit (1964–1992): 2.860 mi (4.603 km)
IMSA GTO	1:48.500	Carl Shafer	Chevrolet Camaro	1977 Mid-America 100 Miles
Group 7	1:54.200	Jack Hinkle	Lola T165	1970 Mid-America SCCA National race
IMSA GTU	1:58.340	Walt Maas	Porsche 914/6	1977 Mid-America 100 Miles
Group 4	2:06.000	Jack Hinkle	Porsche 906	1967 Mid-America SCCA National race
Group 3	2:11.000	Mack Yates	Shelby Cobra	1964 Mid-America SCCA Regional race
