= Marlboro Motor Raceway =

Motorsports park near Upper Marlboro, Maryland

Coordinates: 38.8071°N 76.7390°W

Marlboro Motor Raceway (MMR) is a now-defunct motorsports park located in Prince George's County, just outside Upper Marlboro, Maryland. MMR closed after the 1969 season and local Sports Car Club of America (SCCA) racing moved to the more advanced Summit Point Motorsports Park due to safety concerns and issues with MMR's management. The remains of the track are still visible from U.S. Route 301 and the entire track layout can still be seen in modern satellite imagery.

== The track ==
Marlboro Motor Raceway existed in three notable forms—a dirt oval, a paved oval ("The Bowl"), and various paved road courses, including a karting track in the infield. Existing track maps do not show the oval as a distinct feature of the track but rather as an integrated series of turns. The general layout, however, is clearly discernible. MMR hosted SCCA, NASCAR and other regional, national and international racing events. Its proximity to Washington, D.C. made it the default venue for the President's Cup (which later became the Governor's Cup).

== Expanded history ==
=== Time of operation ===
Originally built in 1952 by Eugene Chaney (of Chaney Enterprises, a large Maryland-based sand, gravel and concrete producer), MMR started life as an all-dirt oval track. For the 1954 season, a road course (which was later expanded) was added and the track was paved. The facility also featured a karting track in the infield of the oval.

The development of this road course was heavily influenced by the Lavender Hill Mob, a Washington, D.C.–based affiliate of the SCCA. Until 1954, most large-scale road races held in the Capital area took place at airfields and other such temporary facilities. MMR was in operation during the height of Maryland motorsports. Between MMR, Beltsville Speedway (an oval track outside northeast D.C.) and Aquasco Speedway (one of the first 1/4-mile drag strips on the east coast and the first in the Mid-Atlantic area), Maryland played host to many high-profile motorsports events and welcomed many historic figures in automobile racing. Motorsports entrepreneur Roger Penske got his start at Marlboro and many other greats in oval and road racing made their way to "The Grand Lady of the East" to test their stock cars and grand prix racers on its challenging curves and intimidating straights.

Marlboro Motor Raceway, 1965

MMR was also utilized by motorcycle racing circuits and hosted such greats as Gary Nixon.

MMR was not strictly used for racing. The Maryland State Police frequently used the track as a training facility for their high-speed maneuvering and handling courses.

"Marlboro Maroon Metallic", a color available on the 1967 and 1970 Chevrolet Corvette and one of many paint codes named for famous racing venues, was named after Marlboro Motor Raceway.

=== Closure ===
MMR's fate was sealed primarily by the construction of Summit Point Motorsports Park (then Summit Point Raceway) in Summit Point, West Virginia. Still in operation today, Summit Point boasted greater safety and a much more accommodating landscape. One major safety concern at Marlboro was its two opposing straights on the south and east sides of the circuit. Oncoming traffic was generally separated by nothing more than a grass median and contemporary wood and tire barriers. Due to the track's location and orientation, addressing the facility's safety flaws would have been costly and tedious. These dangerous straights bordered a large wetland area which has since been designated a nature preserve and the aptly named "Creek Bend" followed the course of the neighboring river. Development to the north and west would infringe on the property's already-scarce parking area.

=== Post-closure ===
The track has been predominantly deserted since its closure. For a while, a part of one of the southern straights beside the back straight of the oval was used as a private helicopter pad, but other than the required markings, it does not appear that the track itself was altered.

SCCA road racing has been virtually absent from Maryland since moving to Summit Point. In 2007, the Washington, D.C. region of the SCCA held a Marlboro reunion at Summit Point. The event included vintage racing vehicles and a scale model slot car replica of MMR. Some previous reunions have taken place at the abandoned MMR site, however that has not been the case for quite some time.

== Marlboro today ==
The property has changed hands many times since the track's closure but it has never been developed. The old parking lot area is currently leased out (according to Ghost Tracks by SCCA historian Pete Hylton, the site is being used for leaf mulching) but the track area itself has only been intruded upon by a neighboring branch of the Patuxent River. Significant damage was done to the property by severe flooding in early 2008. None of the buildings (such as they are) appear to have been impacted, but further sections of the track surface were buried or washed out. Unlike the raised structures, the track surface is not clearly visible from outside the property, so there is little way to determine if any further deterioration has taken place.

Marlboro was also highlighted alongside several other abandoned motorsports facilities in 0-60 Magazine's 2008 Car of the Year ("Tommy") awards feature.

== Future plans ==
Enthusiasts and developers alike have demonstrated interest in the MMR property, but nothing has been pursued with any degree of urgency. Any attempt to re-open the facility would likely be met with opposition from the surrounding residential population and environmental groups seeking to protect the neighboring river and park land. Some plans for the site have been discussed (mostly in private) but significant economic and logistical barriers stand in the way of even the most fundamental planning. The property is currently on the market with an asking price of $9.5 million.

== 12 Hours of Marlboro ==
Year	Winner	Car
1961	(United States) Rune Svensson (United States) Art Tattersall	Volvo PV544
1962	(United States) Harry Beck (United States) Brad Howes	Volvo PV544
1963	(United Kingdom) Jack Sears (South Africa) Bob Olthoff	Ford Cortina GT
1964	(United Kingdom) Jackie Stewart (United Kingdom) Mike Beckwith	Lotus Cortina
1965	(United States) Monty Winkler (United States) Pete van der Vate	Alfa Romeo Giulia TI Super
1966^{1}	(United States) Bob Tullius (United States) Tony Adamowicz	Dodge Dart

=== Notes ===
^1 In 1966 the 12 Hours of Marlboro was the fifth round of the 1966 Trans-American Sedan Championship.
