= Parkinson (TV series) =

British television chat show (1971–2007)

- Starring: Michael Parkinson
- Opening theme: "It All Happens on Saturday" ("Michael Parkinson's Theme") by Harry Stoneham
- Country of origin: United Kingdom
- Original language: English
- No. of series: 31
- No. of episodes: 540

Production
- Running time: 60 minutes

Original release
- Network: BBC One (1971–1982, 1998–2004); ITV (1987–1988, 2004–2007); Sky Arts (2012–2014)
- Release: 19 June 1971 – 22 December 2007

Parkinson is a British television chat show presented by Michael Parkinson. It was first shown on BBC One from 19 June 1971 to 10 April 1982 and from 9 January 1998 to 24 April 2004. Parkinson then switched to ITV on which the show continued from 4 September 2004 to 22 December 2007. A parallel series was shown in Australia on the ABC between 1979 and 1982. A series entitled Parkinson One to One was produced by Yorkshire Television from 28 March 1987 to 23 July 1988.

Parkinson was revived again as Parkinson: Masterclass on Sky Arts from 2012 to 2014.

== Background ==
Parkinson began in 1971 when the host was offered a series of twelve shows by the BBC's Head of Light Entertainment, Bill Cotton. It was to be transmitted during the "summer lull" in a late-night slot on Saturdays (which continued throughout its run), plus from 1979 a second mid-week edition when the series was on air. A parallel series was shown in Australia between 1979 and 1982. That year, 1982, Parkinson left the BBC to be co-founder and presenter on the ITV breakfast television station TV-am, where after many schedule upheavals he ended up presenting the Saturday and Sunday morning programme with his wife, Mary Parkinson, until 1984.

Michael Parkinson would eventually return to the BBC for further series. However, in between his work for the BBC he did two series of chat shows for Yorkshire Television in 1987–1988 as Parkinson One to One, the format being an interview with a single guest (a practice occasionally employed during his time with the BBC).

He returned to the BBC in August 1995 to present a series of retrospective shows, Parkinson: The Interviews, featuring memorable excerpts, eventually presenting a new, revived version of his chat show on BBC One in January 1998. However, in April 2004, ITV announced that it had "poached" the interviewer from the BBC from the autumn of that year. Parkinson said that he was sad to be leaving the BBC but that he and the channel controller, Lorraine Heggessey, could not agree on a suitable slot for his show following the return of Premiership football highlights to the BBC One Saturday evening schedule. The ITV version of the programme, produced by Granada, debuted in September 2004, with an identical set, theme tune and format to the BBC edition. Its audience was around 6m viewers.

The last Parkinson run on the BBC (1998–2004) was one of the few recent British TV programmes that was not made in widescreen. However, his ITV show was recorded in the format with very tight close-ups.

== Programme format ==
Initially Bill Cotton was keen on a format more akin to the USA's Ed Sullivan Show, featuring entertainment and chat. However, Parkinson and his producer, Richard Drewett (who had worked on Late Night Line-Up), envisaged a combination of guests whose celebrity had been achieved in different fields. Their plan was that the final section of each show would become a conversation rather than a formal interview. The pair wanted to move the style as far as possible from the American prototype, even down to the removal of the host's desk, which Parkinson viewed as the "biggest obstacle to a proper interview". At first, Cotton was against this but Drewett convinced him otherwise.

A typical programme included three interviews, each lasting around 15 minutes. It was customary for the first two guests to remain after their own chats to observe and occasionally participate in those that followed. Such contributions were usually made respectfully, and when invited, though this policy backfired on occasion. In addition, some Hollywood stars were honoured in receiving a solo spot, Russell Crowe being one example. On occasion, an episode featured a single guest for its entire duration if the subject was deemed to be sufficiently deserving. This was the case in 2005 when Madonna appeared as part of her Hung Up Promo Tour; besides her interview she performed two songs.

There was usually a musical interlude at some point, featuring a current recording star. If a solo singer, he/she was accompanied by the show's musicians, who also provided the walk-on music for each guest. In the 1970s, the group was led by organist Harry Stoneham, who composed the show's theme tune. The role was undertaken by Laurie Holloway in the relaunched show.

== Interviewing style ==
Michael Parkinson always sought guests who, besides being well known, had some sort of story to relate. He then saw his job as allowing them to tell it and did so by being open, relaxed and attentive. (He learnt very early on that in order to be an adept interviewer, he had to be a good listener.) He researched his subjects thoroughly, and, in the early shows, always had his list of questions to hand. Having guided them to an area of discussion, he rarely interrupted his guests – except to provide the occasional prompt – instead letting them expand on a particular topic. Sometimes, a person would warm to this style with unpredictable results. For example, he regards his chats with Shirley MacLaine as bordering on flirtatious. In his final programme, broadcast 22 December 2007, Parkinson stated that one of his most memorable interviews was with Jacob Bronowski in 1973.

== Guests ==
By his own reckoning, Parkinson interviewed over 2,000 of the world's most famous people, including: Anthony Hopkins, Barry White, Barry, Robin and Maurice Gibb, Ben Elton, Bette Midler, Billie Piper, Billy Connolly, Bing Crosby, Bob Hawke, Bob Hope, Bonnie Tyler, Buddy Rich, Cameron Diaz, Celine Dion, Cher, Clint Eastwood, Dame Edna Everage, Daniel Craig, Dave Allen, David Attenborough, David Beckham, David Bowie, David Tennant, Denzel Washington, Diana Ross, Dudley Moore, Dustin Hoffman, Edith Evans, Elaine Stritch, Elton John, Eric Idle, Ewan McGregor, Freddie Starr, Gary Glitter, Gene Wilder, George Best, George Michael, Geri Halliwell, Gough Whitlam, Gillian Anderson, Harold Wilson, Helen Mirren, Ingrid Bergman, Jack Lemmon, Jennifer Lopez, Jeremy Clarkson, Joan Collins, Joan Rivers, John Cleese, John Lennon, Jon Pertwee, Judi Dench, Julie Andrews, Justin Timberlake, Kate Winslet, k.d. lang, Kenneth Williams, Leslie Thomas, Liberace, Luciano Pavarotti, Madonna, Malcolm Fraser, Mark Knopfler, Mel Gibson, Michael Caine, Michael Crawford, Michael Palin, Miss Piggy, Morecambe and Wise, Muhammad Ali, Naomi Campbell, Nicholas Lyndhurst, Noel Gallagher, Oliver Reed, Olivia Newton-John, Ozzy Osbourne, Paul McCartney, Paul Schrader, Peter Cook, Peter Kay, Peter Sellers, Peter Ustinov, Phil Collins, Pierce Brosnan, Raquel Welch, Ray Winstone, Richard Attenborough, Richard Burton, Richard Harris, Ricky Hatton, Robbie Coltrane, Robin Williams, Robert Redford, Rod Stewart, Ronnie Barker, Rowan Atkinson, Sandra Bullock, Sarah, Duchess of York, Sean Connery, Shane Warne, Sharon Osbourne, Shirley MacLaine, Simon Cowell, Thierry Henry, Tina Turner, Tom Cruise, Tom Hanks, Tom Lehrer, Tommy Cooper, Tony Blair, Trevor McDonald, Victoria Beckham, Viggo Mortensen, and Walter Matthau.

During the 1970s, he attracted former big-name Hollywood stars, such as Fred Astaire, Orson Welles, James Stewart, John Wayne, Mickey Rooney, David Niven, Gene Kelly, James Cagney and Robert Mitchum, not on the basis that they had a film to promote, but simply because they wanted a chat. Despite this, Parkinson has since asserted that then as now, "there was just as much plugging in the seventies as at any time later. To suggest otherwise is to misunderstand the reason people come on to talk shows." In particular, he cites Bette Davis as being the guest who "more than anyone, made it clear she was there to plug a product, not because she was, or ever would be, your buddy."

Many guests appeared more than once and others on numerous occasions; Peter Ustinov was a guest eight times. The record for most appearances is held by Scottish comedian Billy Connolly, having been a guest on fifteen occasions. His final appearance was in Parkinson's penultimate show, broadcast on 16 December 2007.

=== Rod Hull and Emu ===
Emu goes for the host

Much to his chagrin, the most repeated clip is of Parkinson's interview with entertainer Rod Hull in 1976. While the pair were chatting, Hull's glove puppet, Emu, continually and (apparently) uncontrollably attacked the interviewer, eventually causing him to fall off his chair. Fellow guest Billy Connolly threatened, "If that bird comes anywhere near me, I'll break its neck and your bloody arm!" Hull swiftly got his "pet" back on best behaviour. Parkinson had always lamented the fact that despite all the star guests he had interviewed over the years, he would probably be remembered for "that bloody bird". However, in an appearance on the TV show Room 101, he got his chance of revenge when the host, Paul Merton, unexpectedly brought Emu locked in a guillotine on stage and Parkinson took his chance by beheading the puppet, saying, "Goodbye, you foul beast."

== Notable moments ==
- On his appearance in the 1970s series, Orson Welles insisted that Parkinson dispose of his list of questions beforehand, reassuring him, "We'll talk."
- Reticent about discussing himself, Peter Sellers agreed to take part only if he were allowed to walk on as someone else. Once introduced, he appeared dressed as a member of the Gestapo, impersonating Kenneth Mars' role in The Producers, and performed a number of lines in character before removing his "mask". He then settled down for what is arguably one of Parkinson's most memorable interviews.
- Richard Burton's chat had to be recorded during the afternoon, for fear that the notorious drinker would be inebriated by the evening if allowed sufficient access to alcohol. Accordingly, the audience was hastily convened and as a result, mainly comprised staff of the BBC canteen – still in their kitchen whites. Burton confessed afterwards that the view from the studio floor as he walked on made him think that the "men in white coats" had caught up with him at last.
- During Kenneth Williams' second appearance in 1973, the talk turned to politics, and particularly the Carry On star's unsympathetic views of trade unions. Williams accepted an invitation to return three weeks later and discuss these with trade unionist Jimmy Reid. The hostile nature of their debate turned an entertainment show into something more akin to a serious current affairs programme, and the then Controller of BBC One, Paul Fox, directed that the programme was not to venture into that sort of territory again. However, Williams would become one of Parkinson's most celebrated guests, making a total of eight appearances over the years.
- In the interview with Helen Mirren in 1975 Parkinson suggested that her good "figure" could detract from her performance. Parkinson's attitude during the interview has been described as sexist by Mirren and many others. Although Mirren spoke dismissively about Parkinson in later interviews, she also laid part of the blame on the Zeitgeist, the seventies being a "perilous" period for women. "I feel it's of its time, and of its time it's embarrassing," Parkinson told Piers Morgan in 2019. "It was over the top, absolutely so."
- Parkinson stated that the most remarkable man he ever interviewed was Muhammad Ali, who appeared four times on the show. During one appearance, the famously articulate Ali launched into an extraordinary tirade when Parkinson challenged him on the nature of his religious beliefs. This caused Parkinson to be lost for words.
- Parkinson witnessed David Niven being physically sick in his dressing room shortly before his interview. The actor informed him that he had always suffered with nerves. However, once before the cameras, he proved to be an accomplished raconteur.
- John Conteh was on the same show as Peter Cook and Dudley Moore. Parkinson asked the boxer if it was true that he never had sex before a fight. While Conteh looked embarrassed, Cook chipped in with an observation for the host: "I wouldn't ask you if you have sex before a show. I can see that you have."
- When comedian Dave Allen appeared in an edition that was transmitted on Halloween in 1981, Parkinson invited his guest to read a suitably themed poem. As he did so in his familiar Irish brogue, and as the ghostly nature of the words became ever more unsettling, the studio lights were gradually dimmed, leaving just a spotlight on Allen. After completing the final line ("And now, as the witching hour approaches...") with much gravitas, he paused, before exclaiming, "What a load of crap!"
- When the show was relaunched on the BBC in 1998, the star guest on the first programme was Sir Anthony Hopkins, who demonstrated his talent for mimicry by telling several Tommy Cooper jokes. The studio audience was very appreciative, and Parkinson was visibly gratified to the actor for getting his new series off to a good start.
- On the programme featuring John Prescott, his own interview was followed by one with Phil Collins. However, the UK's Deputy Prime Minister interjected frequently and at great length during Parkinson's chat with the musician. The exasperated host finally pleaded, "May I have my guest back, please?"
- Before being interviewed as a well-known comedian in his own right, Peter Kay was once a warm-up act for the Parkinson studio audience. In 2005, Parkinson returned the favour by appearing alongside other UK celebrities such as Ronnie Corbett, Jim Bowen, Geoffrey Hayes and Shakin' Stevens on Kay's video with Tony Christie for their number one single, "(Is This the Way to) Amarillo".
- In 1999, Woody Allen was visibly disturbed when the line of questioning turned to details of the custody battle for his children.
- In October 2003, while in the UK to promote her film In the Cut, Meg Ryan made a controversial appearance on Parkinson, which resulted in negative publicity. The press accused both Ryan and Parkinson of being rude to each other. Ryan gave a few one-word answers, and after she acknowledged that she wasn't comfortable with the interview, Parkinson asked her what she would do if she were in his position now. She replied that she would "just wrap it up". Parkinson later revealed to the press that he felt her behaviour to his earlier guests, Trinny Woodall and Susannah Constantine, whom she turned her back on, was "unforgivable". Ryan also commented that Parkinson was a "nut" and said that she was "offended" by him as he was like a "disapproving father" in his tone. In a 2006 survey of British TV viewers, her behaviour on the show was voted the third "most shocking" TV chat show moment ever.
- In an episode broadcast on ITV on 4 March 2006, Tony Blair became the first serving prime minister to be interviewed by Parkinson and volunteered the information that he believed he would be judged by God for the Iraq War. He also told of how Cherie Blair's father (Tony Booth) had asked if he could light a marijuana joint when they first met.
- Parkinson was once asked if there was anyone that he regretted never having interviewed. He replied, "Sinatra was the one that got away. Otherwise, I've met everyone I have ever wanted to meet."

== Retirement ==
Michael Parkinson announced his retirement on 26 June 2007:

After three enjoyable and productive years at ITV, and after 25 years of doing my talk show I have decided that this forthcoming series will be my last. I’m going to take next year off to write my (sic) autobiography and consider other television projects. My thanks go out to all those who have worked on the shows down the years and the viewers for their loyal support and occasional kind words.

The last regular Parkinson programme (the penultimate of the final series) was broadcast on ITV on 16 December 2007. An extended edition, it featured Billy Connolly, Peter Kay, Michael Caine, David Attenborough, Judi Dench, David Beckham, Jamie Cullum and Dame Edna Everage. The episode drew in 8.3 million viewers.

The last show, broadcast on 22 December 2007, showed memorable clips from previous interviews.

== Transmissions ==
=== Original series ===
Series	Start date	End date	Episodes
BBC
1	19 June 1971	12 December 1971	21
2	3 June 1972	17 April 1973	37
3	8 September 1973	22 January 1974	23
4	28 August 1974	25 December 1974	18
5	30 August 1975	14 February 1976	24
6	4 September 1976	7 April 1977	25
7	3 September 1977	2 January 1978	18
8	2 September 1978	10 February 1979	24
9	22 September 1979	15 March 1980	49
10	6 September 1980	7 March 1981	45
11	3 October 1981	3 April 1982	27
14	9 January 1998	5 December 1998	11
15	8 January 1999	17 December 1999	15
16	21 January 2000	7 April 2000	12
17	8 September 2000	12 November 2000	10
18	17 February 2001	21 April 2001	10
19	22 September 2001	24 December 2001	10
20	23 February 2002	18 May 2002	10
21	21 September 2002	24 December 2002	10
22	22 February 2003	3 May 2003	9
23	20 September 2003	29 November 2003	10
24	21 February 2004	24 April 2004	10
ITV
12	28 March 1987	16 May 1987	8
13	28 May 1988	23 July 1988	8
25	4 September 2004	25 December 2004	11
26	12 February 2005	9 April 2005	9
27	8 October 2005	24 December 2005	11
28	4 March 2006	22 April 2006	8
29	16 September 2006	23 December 2006	13
30	5 May 2007	23 June 2007	7
31	15 September 2007	17 November 2007	9

=== Specials ===
Date	Entitle
26 December 1977	Parkinson and the Comedians
28 February 1981	Parkinson 300
10 April 1982	11 Years of Parkinson
23 June 2006	The Best of Parkinson
24 November 2007	The Music Special
16 December 2007	The Final Conversation
22 December 2007	The Final Show
28 August 2021	Parkinson at 50
