= Richard Drewett =

British executive producer in television entertainment

- Born: October 22, 1935; Crowborough, East Sussex, England
- Died: January 19, 2008 (aged 72); London, England
- Occupations: Executive producer, television
- Years active: 1964-1999
- Known for: Long professional partnerships with Michael Parkinson and Clive James

Richard Searle Drewett (1935–2008) was a British television executive producer specialising in talk shows and light entertainment from the 1960s to the 1990s. Working for BBC Television and London Weekend Television and later with his company Watchmaker Productions, Drewett played a key role in the development of the television talk show. He started in television as one of the producers of the 1960s arts and review show Late Night Line-Up and in a career of nearly 40 years, during which he won three British Academy of Film and Television Arts BAFTA Awards, he developed long-running professional partnerships with presenters Michael Parkinson and Clive James and promoted the television career of Barry Humphries in his comedic alter-ego Dame Edna Everage. He promoted the early careers of a number of noted female television producers and executives.

== Early life ==
Drewett was born on 22 October 1935 in Crowborough, East Sussex, England, the son of an engineer. He was brought up in Wimborne Minster, Dorset and after school carried out his compulsory National Service in the British Army where he sustained a non-combat foot injury followed by a "bungled" repair operation which caused great pain for the rest of his life.

Drewett's first employment after the army was as a local newspaper reporter on the Poole and Dorset Herald. He moved on to become a management trainee with George Newnes Ltd, one of London's magazine publishers. He then became a freelance comedy writer, working mostly for BBC Radio in London. Among the programmes he worked on were Monday Night at Home, described by the BBC as "a selection of recorded wit, music, and humour" and broadcast on the BBC Home Service with Drewett's first contribution being aired in March 1961, and Just Before Midnight, a long-running series of fifteen-minute plays on the BBC Light Programme.

== BBC Television ==
In 1964 BBC Television began recruiting and training staff to service its new second television channel, BBC2. Drewett took the opportunity, and joined the corporation to train in production. Within a few months, he joined the BBC's Presentation department and became one of the writers and producers of BBC2's Late Night Line-Up, a nightly, live, open-ended programme which reviewed television, interviewed guests, presented musicians performing, and discussed the arts generally. It was on this show that Drewett first learnt the skills of booking guests and shaping programmes, experience that governed his programme choices for his entire television career. The writer and television presenter Clive James who worked with Drewett for twenty years towards the end of his career maintained that Drewett "remained trapped by his skill at meeting the elevated requirements of Late Night Line-Up."

After five years with Late Night Line-Up, Drewett was persuaded to move to the BBC's Variety department, which in 1969 was presenting Dee Time, a sometimes troubled early evening chat show presented by a former pirate radio disc jockey, Simon Dee. Drewett took over production of the show in May 1969, making 26 programmes until the end of Dee's BBC contract in December that year.

An arts documentary followed, as part of the weekly arts magazine programme Review. Elmyr - The True Picture?, about the painter and art forger Elmyr de Hory, was jointly directed by Drewett and the French film director François Reichenbach and produced by Drewett. It was first broadcast in May 1970 on BBC2.

Searching for a replacement for Dee Time the BBC decided on a chat show series to be presented by the actor Derek Nimmo, a sitcom star. The show was called If It's Saturday, It Must Be Nimmo and was billed as "And if it's Derek Nimmo expect the unexpected as he talks, entertains, and welcomes his guests". Drewett was producer and the series of nine programmes ran in the same early evening slot as Dee Time from October to December 1970. It was felt that Nimmo was "uneasy" in the role of chat show host and the series "wasn't doing great business".

Drewett badgered BBC Television's head of light entertainment, Bill Cotton, with an idea for a late-night talk show based on the Dick Cavett Show he had seen in the United States. Cotton thought his idea was worth trying and suggested that Michael Parkinson, a former newspaper journalist turned casual TV presenter, might be a workable host and instructed Drewett to produce a series of eleven shows in the summer of 1971. In preparing for the series Drewett and Parkinson set the pattern for a talk show which was to give Parkinson solid work for 36 years. A late night talk show was not a new concept in Britain; ABC Weekend TV launched The Eamonn Andrews Show on the British Independent Television network (ITV) in October 1964 and it ran for five years. But for Drewett Parkinson and its success was a calling card for the rest of his career.

Drewett and Parkinson, very much in agreement, set ground rules. The opening music was upbeat and jazzy. There was a staircase down to the set for the entrances of Parkinson and his guests. Serious interviews would be blended with show business. Guests would stay on the set throughout the programme so that a conversation could develop. Music on the show would be anything from jazz to classics and in between, but not hit parade material. It was found difficult to book a star guest for the opening programme with a comparatively unknown and untried presenter and a series with no previous profile. Drewett solved the disinclination of any star to agree to appear by persuading his parents' neighbour in Ibiza, British film star, Terry-Thomas, to consent to appear.

The first edition of Parkinson went out on BBC1 on Saturday 19 June 1971. For the ensuing editions, Drewett - "a clever and tenacious booker," according to Parkinson - managed to book stars of the calibre of Peter Ustinov, John Lennon and Yoko Ono, Spike Milligan, Harold Pinter, Shirley MacLaine, George Best, Michael Caine, and for a solo guest episode of the series, after much perseverance by Drewett, Orson Welles. The series was deemed to be so successful that the BBC demanded a second series to start on 10 October 1971 after only a five-week break. The show, with Parkinson's increasingly adept interviewing and attractive personality and Drewett's "astonishing rigour" in the way he prepared talk shows, insisting on research interviews with guests prior to recording, quickly became the flagship of the BBC's prime-time schedule. Parkinson went on to present multiple editions of the show on the BBC and later on ITV, the last edition being transmitted in 2007. Drewett, widely regarded as Parkinson's "midwife", stayed with the show until 1977, producing the first 132 editions.

While running Parkinson, Drewett made two documentaries with Derek Nimmo in which the actor visited Las Vegas and Australia. They were transmitted in April 1972 and December 1973 respectively.

In 1973 Drewett acted as associate producer on the film F for Fake, a docudrama about art forgery co-written, directed by, and starring Orson Welles. This film was initially a commercial and critical failure but it has grown in stature over the years.

A further diversion from Parkinson came with the making of Forty Years, a programme looking back at the previous four decades of BBC Television, produced by Drewett and transmitted for the first time in August 1976.

== London Weekend Television ==
As the sixth series of Parkinson came to an end in the spring of 1977, Drewett left the BBC after thirteen years to work for the independent television company London Weekend Television (LWT). For an entertainment and features producer, Richard Drewett's move to LWT made sense. With Michael Grade as director of programmes and David Bell as controller of entertainment, in the late 1970s the company was moving quickly to challenge the BBC's dominance in the ratings in an attempt to establish ITV as the nation's Saturday night entertainment channel.

One of the first programmes Drewett produced for LWT was one-off special with the US film actor Robert Redford entitled Robert Redford on the Outlaw Trail in which Drewett tempted the star to expound on his obsession with the truth about the American frontier. Drewett's film crew followed Redford as he retraced an old outlaw trail to Colorado. It transmitted on ITV in the summer of 1978.

Soon afterwards Drewett's next one-off programme was another look back at television history, written and presented by Denis Norden. Of necessity this show went back only one decade, to feature Ten Years of LWT, and was described as a personal view by Nordern. It was transmitted on 1 September 1978.

Drewett's first major programme at LWT was Bruce Forsyth's Big Night, a series transmitted in the autumn of 1978. Bruce Forsyth was poached from the BBC to act as the anchor for a full Saturday evening's entertainment, with quiz games, situation comedy, audience participation, and celebrity guests and interviews. The budget was £2million for what was originally planned as a 14-week run. LWT's controller of entertainment, David Bell, ran the variety part of the show as executive producer, LWT's head of comedy, Humphrey Barclay, produced the sitcom segments, and Drewett was the producer in charge of booking celebrity guests and running the chat show elements. Big Night was promoted as ITV's "first serious attempt to dent the BBC's superiority on Saturday nights". Drewett booked guest interviewees and performers of the stature of Dolly Parton, Elton John, Cleo Laine, Bette Midler, The Carpenters, Sammy Davis Jr. and Demis Roussos. The first show in the series was on 7 October 1978 and it topped the UK television ratings, but audience numbers rapidly declined. Within weeks the show had lost a third of its audience to the BBC. Considered a disaster, the series ran to only ten programmes. Despite Drewett's big-name roster of guests the series was poorly received by critics and the public and was unsuccessful in winning over the BBC's audience. LWT brought in consultants to assess the show. Among their recommendations was that British star guests should be brought in rather than Americans. At the end of the year the series was abandoned.

Drewett's next big LWT show was a royal gala entertainment in the presence of Princess Margaret. It was staged at the National Theatre to celebrate 50 years of the British actors' trade union Equity with the proceeds going to theatrical charities. Billed as The Night of 100 Stars it actually featured 130 stars and was Drewett's biggest booking project in his television producing career to that date. As it was such a major endeavour he shared production with David Bell. It was transmitted on the ITV network on 21 December 1980.

A few days later, 26 December 1980 saw the first of LWT's An Audience With... shows, a long-running series of occasional "confrontations" between star performers and the TV studio audience. The concept was David Bell's, but the fine-tuning of the production was down to Drewett who ensured that the studio audience contained not just ordinary members of the public, but prominently in front of the audience several rows of "stars" from television, radio, films, sport, politics and Fleet Street. The first of these shows was An Audience With Dame Edna Everage, the "housewife-superstar" alter ego of Australian actor and comedian Barry Humphries. The show itself, and the format, was rated highly and Drewett carried the series on for the next few years with Dudley Moore (1981), Kenneth Williams (1983), Mel Brooks (1983), Another Audience with Dame Edna Everage (1984), Billy Connolly (1985), and (in Drewett's last exercise in this format) Peter Ustinov (1988). The series has continued for over 40 years, but as one critic noted (with a credit to Drewett's expertise), "It's given us some very funny moments. The trouble is, they almost all came within the first 10." Another Audience With Dame Edna Everage won Drewett his first of three BAFTA Awards.

1980 had seen Drewett named as Head of Specials at LWT with a new unit in the Entertainment department and charged with developing and producing one-off entertainment programmes and lighter documentaries.

Over the following seven years at LWT Drewett produced and executive-produced a large number of special programmes. January 1981 saw a one-hour sitcom special filmed in Spain as a vehicle for British comedian Jasper Carrott called Carrott del Sol. Then there was a documentary, James Bond: The First 21 Years, for which Drewett used his contacts assembled from producing 132 editions of Parkinson to book 70 prominent guest interviewees to talk about the first 21 years of the James Bond movie franchise. The third actor to play Bond, Roger Moore, appeared but even Drewett's booking skills could not encourage either the second James Bond, George Lazenby, or the progenitor of the role, Sean Connery, to join in, though he did manage to persuade then US President Ronald Reagan to introduce the film. The programme was transmitted in May 1983.

Around the same time, Drewett launched an early evening chat and review show for the London area presented by Gloria Hunniford, one of the first female broadcasters to host her own chat show. Sunday, Sunday ran for eight years until 1990 with a wealth of guests and a review of what was on in London though, being regional, the selection of interviewees was usually more domestic and low-key than those on Parkinson. It was well-received locally. Having set up the series, Drewett left it to take on other projects.

One of these in 1984 was The Trial of Richard III, which was devised and produced by Drewett. Running 3 hours 25 minutes, it took the form of a dramatisation of a modern trial by jury, as if at the Old Bailey, of King Richard III on a charge of murdering, 500 years before, Edward V and his younger brother Richard of Shrewsbury, Duke of York, the so-called Princes in the Tower. Real senior lawyers and leading historians and scientists took part in the trial and at the conclusion the jury delivered a verdict. It was transmitted on the independent television channel, Channel 4, in November 1984. Drewett, with producer Mark Redhead, published a book on the programme, with the same title.

Drewett went on to executive-produce another television trial two years later. On Trial: Lee Harvey Oswald, featured a real judge and lawyers and a Dallas jury, together with surviving witnesses, to try to determine the guilt or innocence of the man believed to have assassinated President John F. Kennedy in 1963. It first transmitted on Channel 4. The New York Times described the programme as "compelling".

In contrast to the two "trials", Drewett developed an "adult" version of LWT's popular long-running series of out-takes and bloopers, It'll be Alright on the Night. This version, presented by Denis Norden, as usual, was called It'll be Alright Late at Night and transmitted in July 1985.

In January 1987 Drewett, as executive producer, launched two series of 30-minute programmes with Griff Rhys Jones and Mel Smith, The World According to Smith & Jones, in which the comedy partnership looked at the story of the world, featuring clips of feature films. The general view of critics and viewers was that the series were little more than "average" and were "a routine effort".

At the same time as Drewett was enabling a regular stream of television specials and series he was developing a long-term professional partnership with the Australian writer and presenter, Clive James, which was to endure until the end of Drewett's career twenty years later. James had made a number of television programmes and series previously, but after making a travelogue-type programme for LWT, a documentary about Sydney, Australia, he was judged as "hopeless" when talking to the camera. LWT was anxious, however, to retain James's "ironic wit". Drewett was seen as the producer who could pull James into a more presentable shape for television.

Their first project together, Drewett's idea, was the Clive James Paris Fashion Show. This programme, while being filmed in 1982 in the French capital, encountered directorial problems. Drewett's resolution of the matter led James to write: "I decided right then that he was the man for me." James recalled that Drewett was interested in taking mainstream entertainment seriously, "but he needed a front man. Eventually he decided that I might fit the bill." Drewett "slaked his craving for danger," claimed James, "by building programmes around me." Drewett was thereafter to be the executive producer on every television programme in a number of different strands which James presented for the next two decades.

Drewett came up with two formats for James which ran for the following six years on LWT, and with subtly different titles and formats continued successfully for many more years. The first was a series of one-off travelogues about various places around the world combined with further travel to meet famous faces. There was, among others, Clive James Live in Las Vegas (1982), Clive James meets Roman Polanski (1984), Clive James meets Katharine Hepburn (1985), Clive James in Dallas (1985), Clive James on Safari (1986), Clive James at the Playboy Mansion (1987) and Clive James in Japan (1987).

Secondly, Drewett came up with the format of Clive James on Television, a series which started in 1982 in which James presented unusual and often unintentionally amusing television extracts and commercials from around the world, subjecting them to his "acerbic wit". It was particularly noted for showing a wealth of clips from Endurance, a Japanese game show whose contestants underwent embarrassing and often painful tasks. Clive James on Television ran for 6 years on ITV until 1988.

At much the same time, Drewett produced The Late Clive James, from 1983 to 1987, the first talk show on the new independent television channel, Channel 4. It featured celebrity interviews, comedy sketches and music performances. David Docherty, in his history of London Weekend Television, described the programme as "eccentric".

Not all of Drewett's attention was focussed on James. In 1984 he launched a Saturday night chat show with Michael Aspel, Aspel & Company, to fill the breach left on Saturday evenings after Michael Parkinson temporarily abandoned his BBC show. This series, which ran until 1993, long after Drewett had sent it on its way, was able to attract high-profile guests, though it had more British personalities than the many visiting US artistes Michael Parkinson brought to his show.

Drewett was also responsible for launching another vehicle for Barry Humphries as Dame Edna Everage. The Dame Edna Experience was "an unpredictable sort of anti-chat show ...in which game but bemused celebrities from Sean Connery to Mary Whitehouse, Charlton Heston to Germaine Greer, Edward Heath to Gina Lollobrigida were exposed to the Dame's dauntingly original interview techniques." Drewett executive-produced the first series in 1987. He won his second BAFTA Award for this programme in 1988.

== Back at BBC Television ==
At the end of 1987 Richard Drewett and Clive James were together invited to join the BBC. Tempted by the prospect, at the beginning of 1988 Drewett left LWT after ten years to rejoin BBC Television with a brief to develop and produce new programming for the BBC's Features and Documentary and Light Entertainment groups. He was also to continue his producing relationship with James who was offered two weekly shows, a number of annual documentaries and specials and his and Drewett's own well-staffed unit.

At the BBC Drewett began a lengthy series of one-off Postcard films from a variety of cities around the world, presented by James, similar to a number of the city-based travelogues the pair had made together at LWT. They came up with about a score of these very popular Clive James's postcard from ... travelogues. The first for the BBC was from Las Vegas, then 1989 saw reports from Rio de Janeiro, Chicago and Paris. In 1990 there were features on Miami, Rome, Shanghai, and Los Angeles. There were two in 1991, from Sydney and London, one in 1993 from Cairo, one in 1994 from New York City, and two in 1995 from Bombay (now Mumbai) and Berlin.

Drewett and James also brought with them from LWT the format of Clive James on Television, renamed for the BBC Saturday Night Clive (then morphing into Sunday Night Clive and eventually Monday Night Clive). This began on the BBC in 1989.

A new show for the BBC in 1988 was The Late Show with Clive James, 45 minutes of sophisticated discussion with intelligent and erudite guests, which mutated into The Talk Show with Clive James and then The Clive James Interview in 1991, where he would discuss "philosophy, art and politics" with guests of the intellectual stature of Gore Vidal, Peter Bogdanovich, Amos Oz, and Carlos Fuentes, "and it all oozed class."

Drewett also came up with the idea for James to mark New Year's Eve 1988 on BBC Television with an hour's end of the year show running up to midnight with James' personal review of the year just passed. The format was repeated in 1989 (with a two-hour programme, Clive James on the 80s, so the whole decade could be reviewed rather than just the previous year), and then every year until 1994. The 1989 show won Drewett his third BAFTA Award.

A major project for Drewett and James at the BBC was an 8-part series Clive James - Fame in the Twentieth Century in which a wealth of archive material was used to examine the nature of 20th-century international fame in the world of the arts, science, politics, sport and show business. The series began transmission on the BBC in January 1993. Expensive and time-consuming to make, the series was ill-served by the BBC who showed it only once, and against a very popular ratings hit on ITV. Despite a general lack of enthusiasm for it at the BBC, it pulled in seven million viewers at its peak and averaged about five million for the whole run. Drewett reassured James, who was worried at what he considered to be low viewing figures, that five million people was a country and that "there was no other form of writing I could practise that would ever come near reaching that many people so directly".

Though Drewett's success with James at the BBC was enduring, a major drawback for Drewett was what he considered to be management interference. He was required to spend half a day each week at meetings where managers were told how to manage. James reported:

Richard loathed every minute of it and gave me scathing reports about how apparatchiks half his age, who had never made a programme in their lives, would give him instructions, couched in barely comprehensible language, on subjects he had learned about the hard way many years before.

A consequence was that Drewett and James decided that if they set up their own production company they could answer only to themselves, make their programmes the way they wanted to and sell them to any buyer.

== Watchmaker Productions ==
In 1994 Drewett and James set up their own production company with the help of The Chrysalis Group which they called Watchmaker Productions. They brought in as managing director one of Drewett's discoveries among female production talent, their colleague Elaine Bedell. Drewett promoted the early careers of several female researchers and producers who have gone on to become successful senior producers and executives.

Now free to work for anyone, Drewett left the BBC and returned to the embrace of ITV, where he and James transmitted further Postcard films: Hong Kong (1996), Melbourne (1996), Mexico City (1996), Las Vegas (1998), and Havana (1999).

The Clive James Show, a chat programme, began on ITV in May 1995 with a long list of popular star guests. This show also introduced a Cuban novelty singer Margarita Pracatan to British audience acclaim. She stayed as a show regular. The programme ran until 1997. James presented two further series of Clive James on Television in 1997 and 1998.

Occasional specials executive-produced by Drewett and presented by James continued to appear on ITV. In 1995 Clive James in Buenos Aires appeared, Clive James Goes Country in 1996 saw James interviewing Chet Atkins and Mark Knopfler, and Drewett's and James's love of fast cars brought to ITV James learning to be a racing driver in 1995, The Clive James Grand Prix Show in 1996 and The Clive James Formula 1 Show in 1997.

Other Drewett specials without Clive James appeared in this period. There was An Evening with Spike Milligan in 1996 for ITV, a programme in the BBC's Omnibus arts documentary series entitled Bring Me Sunshine: The Heart and Soul of Eric Morecambe appeared in 1998, and at the end of the same year on ITV, Stanley Baxter in Person, featured the first in-depth interview for forty years with the actor, comedian and impressionist.

In 1998 Drewett, at the age of 63, was diagnosed with Parkinson's disease but at first hid his early symptoms. At the same time James became discouraged by television's "inexorable" veering downmarket. The pair sold Watchmaker Productions to their backers, The Chrysalis Group. James recalled that they were left with "the only real money either of us had ever made in show business".

Drewett decided Watchmaker Productions should revive the end of the year show format for the turn of the Millennium with himself as executive producer. Entitled A Night of 1000 years it transmitted on ITV in the last hours of 1999. The show was recorded over two days with a third day for the edit, but Drewett's Parkinson's disease prevented him from turning up for the editing. It was to be his last television programme. (Note: Throughout his television career Richard Drewett was mostly credited with his legal surname Drewett but often his surname was given as Drewitt. The primary editor of this article has been unable to establish the reason for the different spelling.) At the age of 65 Drewett had to call a halt to his career. James recorded in his Guardian obituary of Drewett that he received "a deep and touching apology" from him when he proved too ill to supervise the editing of the last show they made together.

== Personal life ==
Richard Drewett married Jill Cuthbert in April 1963 and they had two children, James and Catherine. Their final home was in Twickenham in West London.

In the late 1950s Drewett began to own and drive veteran racing cars and was an enthusiastic motor hillclimber with a particular loyalty to the British marques Frazer Nash and Lotus and a love for the hillclimbing course at Shelsley Walsh in Worcestershire and the speed venue of Goodwood Circuit. It was with the onset of Parkinson's disease in his sixties that he was forced to sell his Lotus 70 Formula 5000 car and his Frazer Nash Le Mans Replica. An Autosport tribute on his death described him as a "quick and competitive driver ... typical of the delightful characters you can still find in the hillclimb paddocks ..."

In his autobiography, Michael Parkinson remembered that he felt comfortable with Drewett from the first moment they met. "He was tall and thin with blue eyes", he wrote, "and a droll take on life".

Clive James recorded that Drewett taught him much about the fruitful use of time. "On top of his charm and good manners," he wrote, "that was the thing that ruled all the other things he could do."

Parkinson invited Drewett - though the latter was by then severely ill - to be in the audience of the last ever Parkinson programme at the end of 2007. Drewett, against all expectation, accepted, but on entering the studio building he fell and fractured a hip. Taken to hospital he died at the age of 72 on 19 January 2008. He was buried in Richmond Cemetery in West London nine days later.

== Notes, references and sources ==
=== Sources ===
- Barfe, Louis (2008). Turned Out Nice Again: The story of British light entertainment. London: Atlantic Books. ISBN 978-1-84354-380-0.
- Docherty, David (1990). Running the Show: 21 years of London Weekend Television. London: Boxtree Limited. ISBN 1-85283-103-0.
- James, Clive (2006). North Face of Soho. London: Picador. ISBN 978-0-330-48128-1.
- James, Clive (2009). The Blaze of Obscurity. London: Picador. ISBN 978-0-330-51105-6.
- Parkinson, Michael (2008). Parky: My Autobiography. London: Hodder & Stoughton. ISBN 978-0-340-96166-7.
- Tesler, Brian (2016). The Best of Times: A personal history of British television 1952-1994. Birmingham: Kaleidoscope Publishing. ISBN 978-1-900203-63-0.
