= Frazer Nash Le Mans Coupe =

Sports prototype race car

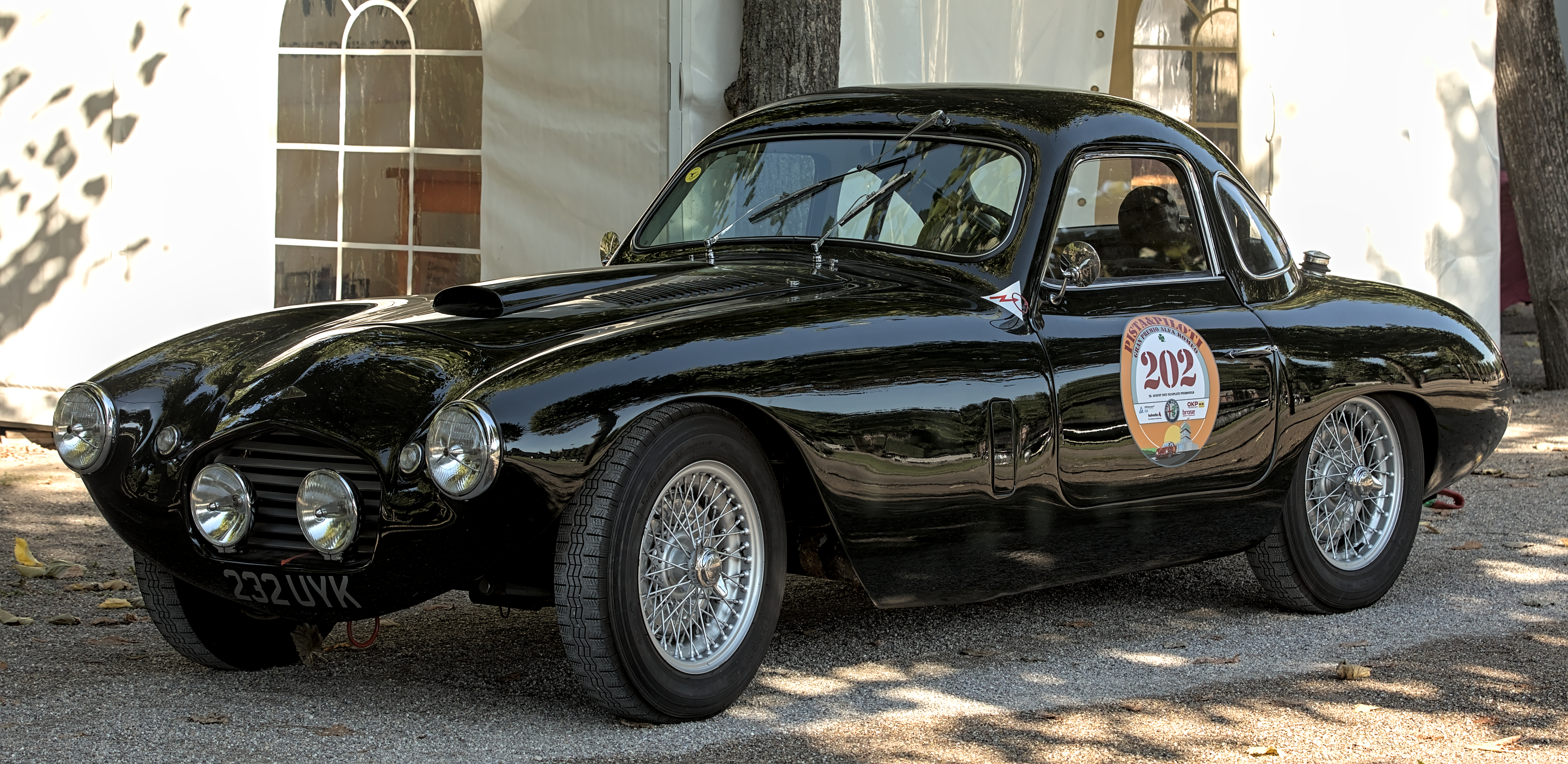
- Category: Sports car
- Production: 1953–1956

Technical specifications
- Chassis: Steel tubular spaceframe, aluminium body
- Suspension (front): lower wishbones, transverse leaf spring, tubular shock absorbers
- Suspension (rear): live axle, torsion bar springs, tubular shock absorbers
- Length: 4,039 mm (159.0 in)
- Width: 1,575 mm (62.0 in)
- Axle track: 1,359 mm (53.5 in) (front); 1,359 mm (53.5 in) (rear)
- Wheelbase: 2,438 mm (96.0 in)
- Engine: Bristol (BMW M328) 2.0 L (122.0 cu in) OHV I6, naturally-aspirated, mid-engined
- Transmission: 4-speed manual
- Power: 140 hp (100 kW)
- Weight: 1,670 lb (760 kg)
- Brakes: Drum brakes

Competition history

The Frazer Nash Le Mans Coupe, is a sports race car, designed, developed, and built by British manufacturer Frazer Nash, between 1953 and 1956. It was the first closed-top Frazer Nash production car.

Nine cars were built. The first racing appearance of the model was at the 1953 Silverstone International Meeting (finished 17th), followed by the 24 Hours of Le Mans the same year (13th). The same car finished 11th at Le Mans a year later

All nine cars were reported to still exist in 2025.
