= Frazer Nash Le Mans Replica =

Sports prototype race car

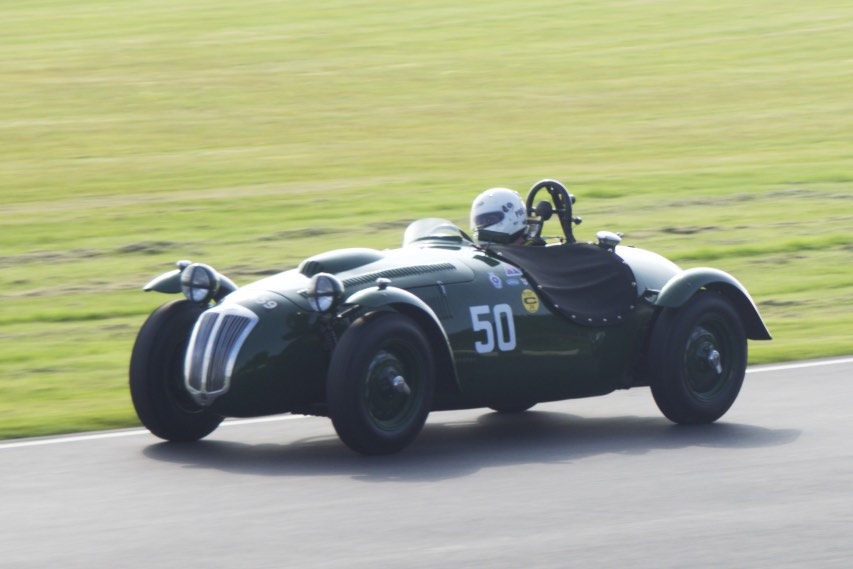
- Category: Sports car
- Production: 1949–1954

Technical specifications
- Chassis: Steel tubular spaceframe or ladder frame, aluminium body
- Suspension (front): lower wishbones, transverse leaf spring, tubular shock absorbers
- Suspension (rear): live axle, torsion bar springs, tubular shock absorbers
- Length: 3,835 mm (151.0 in)
- Width: 1,448–1,499 mm (57.0–59.0 in)
- Axle track: 1,219–1,270 mm (48.0–50.0 in) (front); 1,219–1,270 mm (48.0–50.0 in) (rear)
- Wheelbase: 2,438 mm (96.0 in)
- Engine: Bristol (BMW M328) 2.0 L (122.0 cu in) OHV I6, naturally-aspirated, mid-engined
- Transmission: 4-speed manual
- Power: 110–140 hp (82–104 kW)
- Weight: 1,400–1,500 lb (640–680 kg)
- Brakes: Drum brakes

Competition history

The Frazer Nash Le Mans Replica, and its evolution, the Frazer Nash Le Mans Replica Mk2, is a sports car, designed, developed and built by British manufacturer Frazer Nash, between 1949 and 1954.

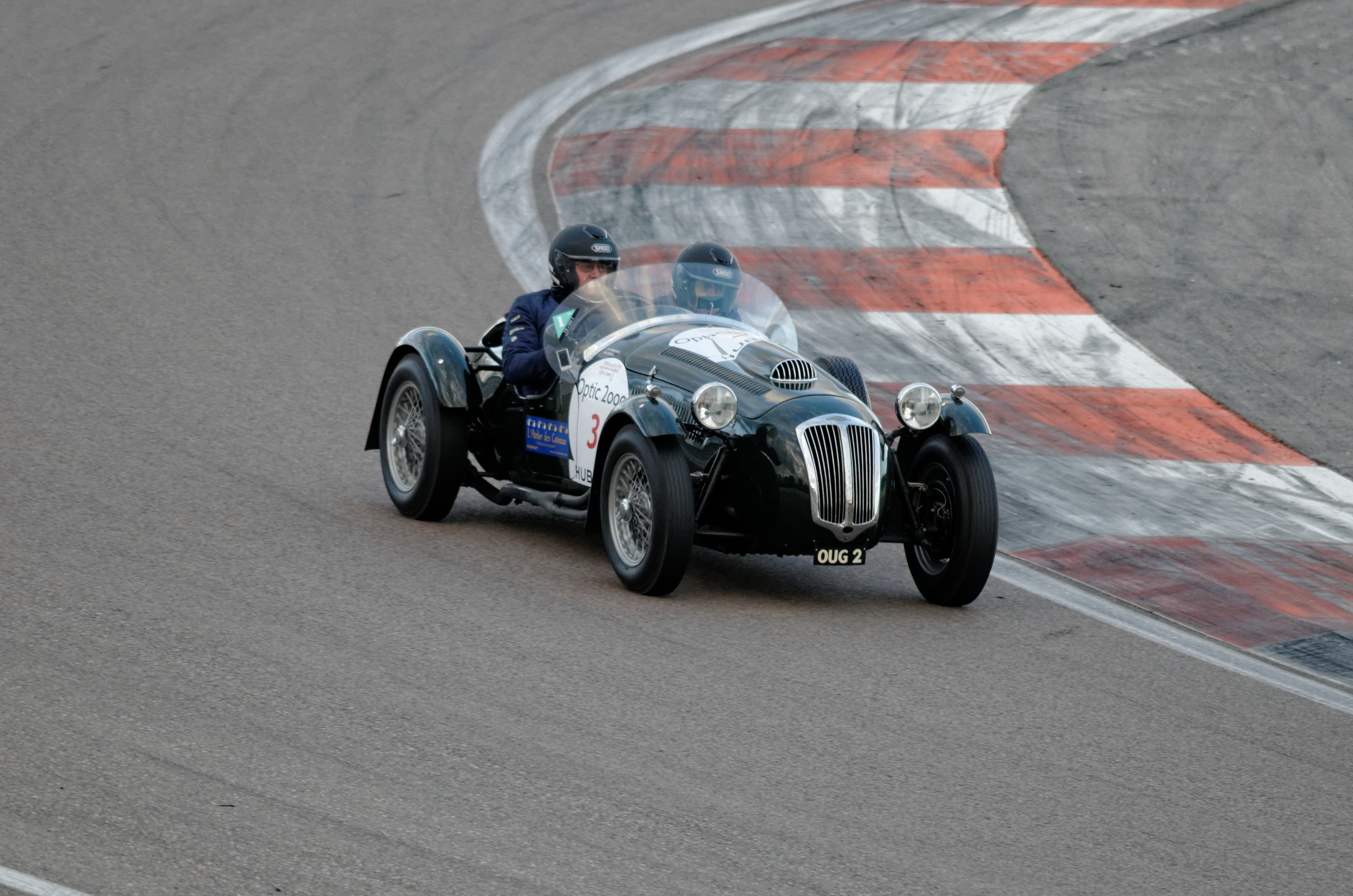

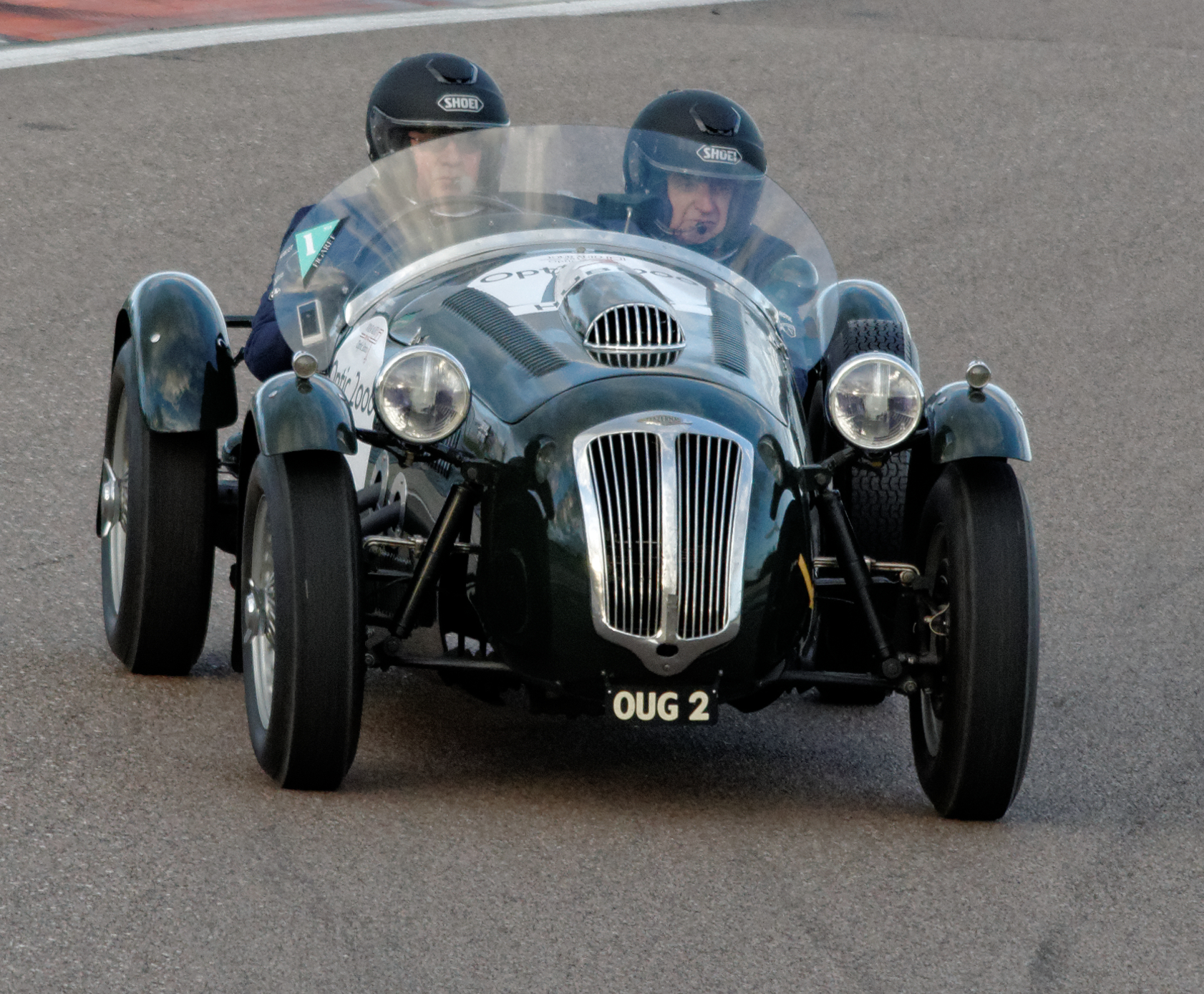
