= Frazer Nash =

British sports car company, founded in 1922

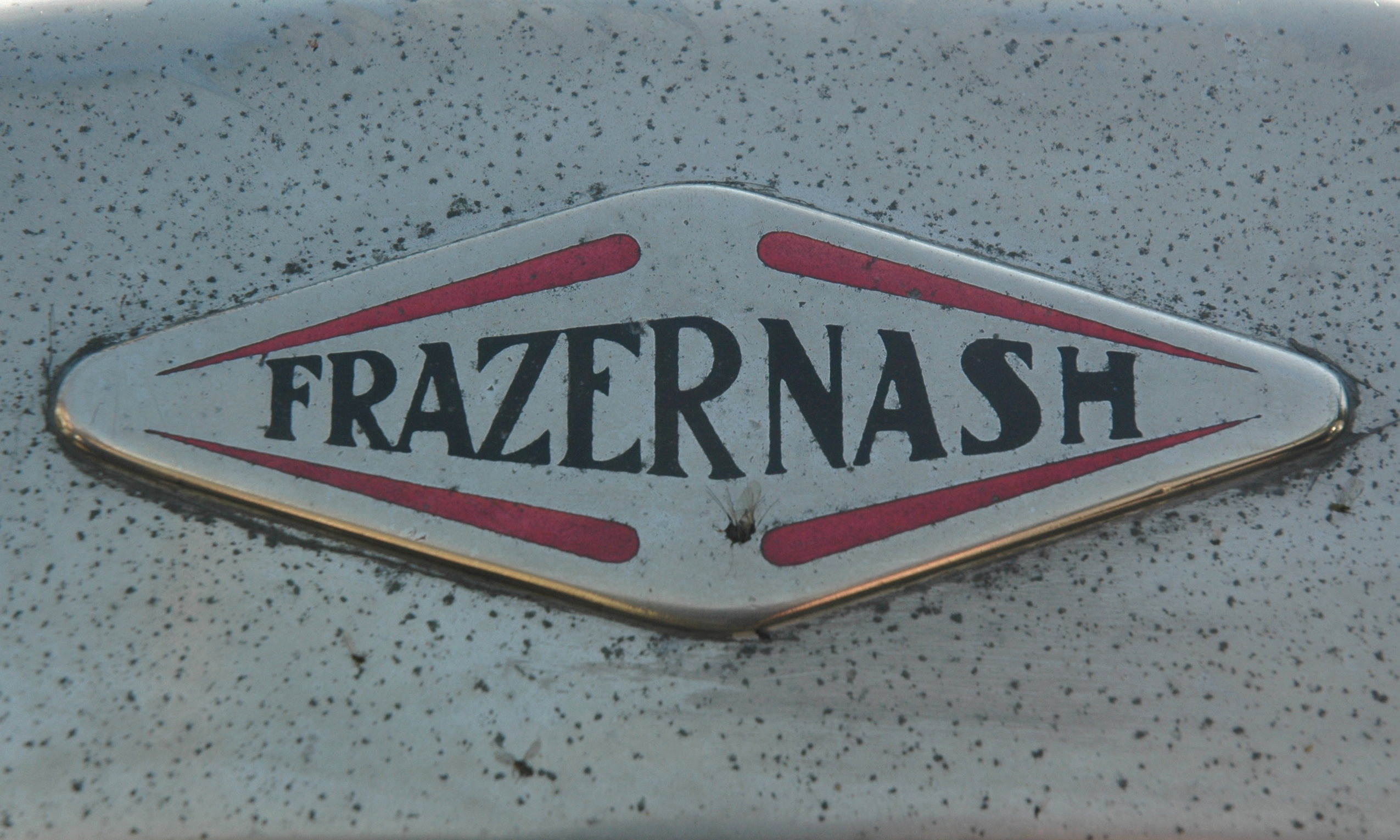
Badge on a 1936 car

Frazer Nash was a brand of British sports car manufactured from 1922 first by Frazer Nash Limited founded by engineer Archibald Frazer-Nash. On its financial collapse in 1927 a new company, AFN Limited, was incorporated. Control of AFN passed to Harold John Aldington in 1929.

Until the Second World War AFN continued to produce a small number of sports cars badged Frazer Nash incorporating a unique multi-chain transmission. It continued after the war making another 85 sports cars before ending manufacture in 1957. The post-war cars had conventional transmissions.

UK agents for BMW arranged coachwork and made modifications, including badging the cars "Frazer Nash BMW".

Control of AFN Limited, UK agents for Porsche, passed from the Aldington family to Porsche in 1987.

Frazer Nash cars were later used in the Historic Grand Prix of Monaco, winning the race on three separate occasions in 2006, 2008 and 2026.

== History ==
=== Archie Frazer Nash ===
Frazer Nash Limited's business was founded in 1922 by Archie Nash. Nash with friend Ron Godfrey had founded and run the GN cyclecar company in 1909 but their partnership split in 1922 and Nash began making his own cars by buying GN components and adding a new body. His new business's activities were centred on Kingston upon Thames, Surrey. The first true Frazer Nash was made in 1924. Nash seemed unable to run a business at a profit. Eventually the faltering business was sold to a new company, AFN Limited, formed in 1927. Profitability did not improve and, with effect from 1 January 1929, H J Aldington was made managing director and Nash was given the post of 'technical adviser'. Archie Nash managed to keep a small shareholding and as if to confirm the link in 1938 hyphenated his second name to his surname and became Archie Frazer-Nash.

=== Aldington brothers ===
During 1929 a majority of AFN's capital was acquired by Harold Joseph ("Aldy") Aldington (1902–1976) and AFN's operations moved to Isleworth, Middlesex. Thereafter, the business was run by the three Aldington brothers: Aldy, Don and Bill. The other two were Donald Arthur Aldington (1907–1997) and William Henry Aldington (1900–1980). They were all usually referred to by their initials.

Frazer Nash and subsequently AFN produced around 350 of the famous chain drive models between 1924 and 1939.

The last of the family owners/directors was Aldy's son, John Taylor ("JT") Aldington, who sold AFN Ltd to Porsche GB in 1987.

=== Frazer Nash BMW ===
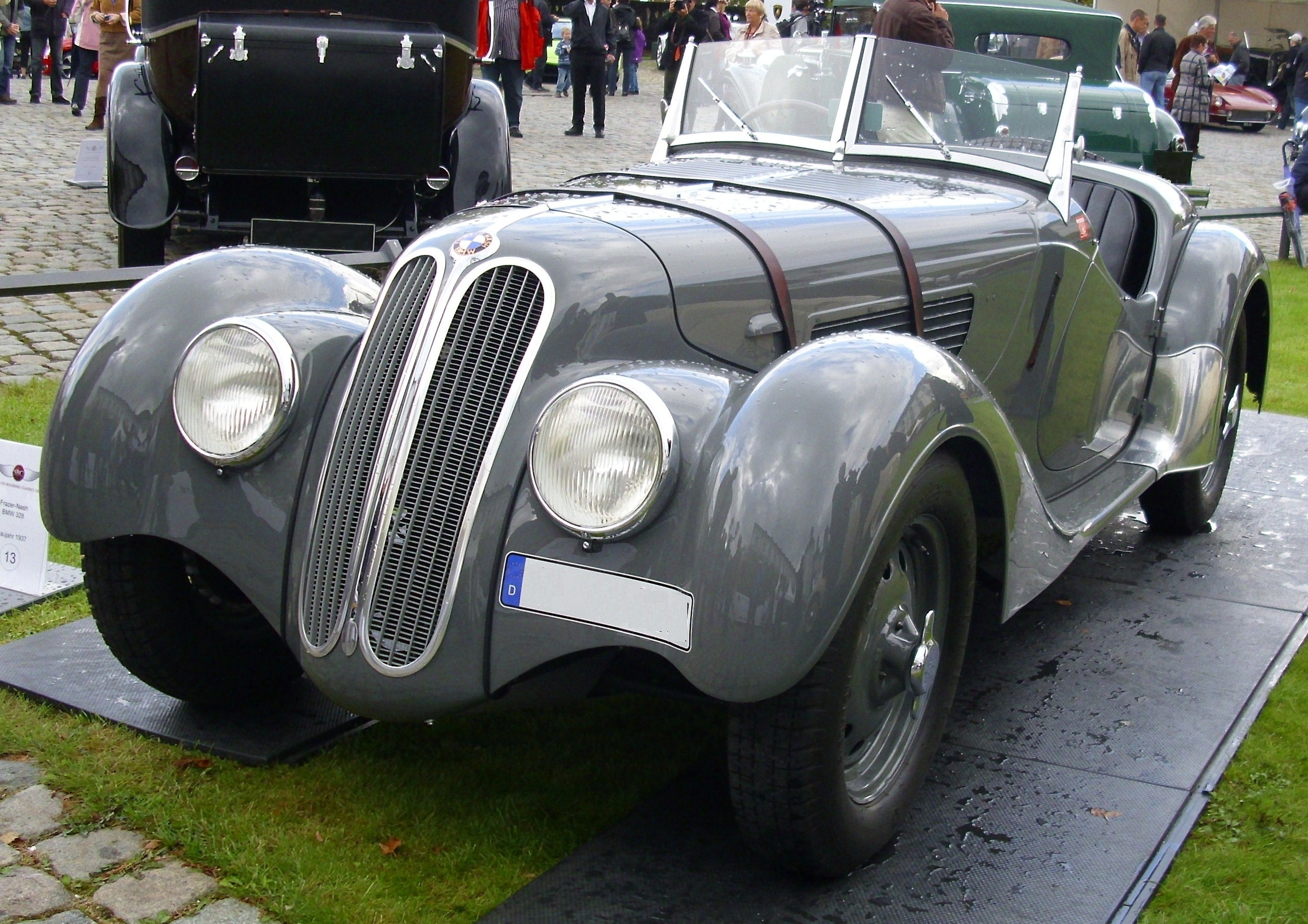
Frazer Nash BMW 1937

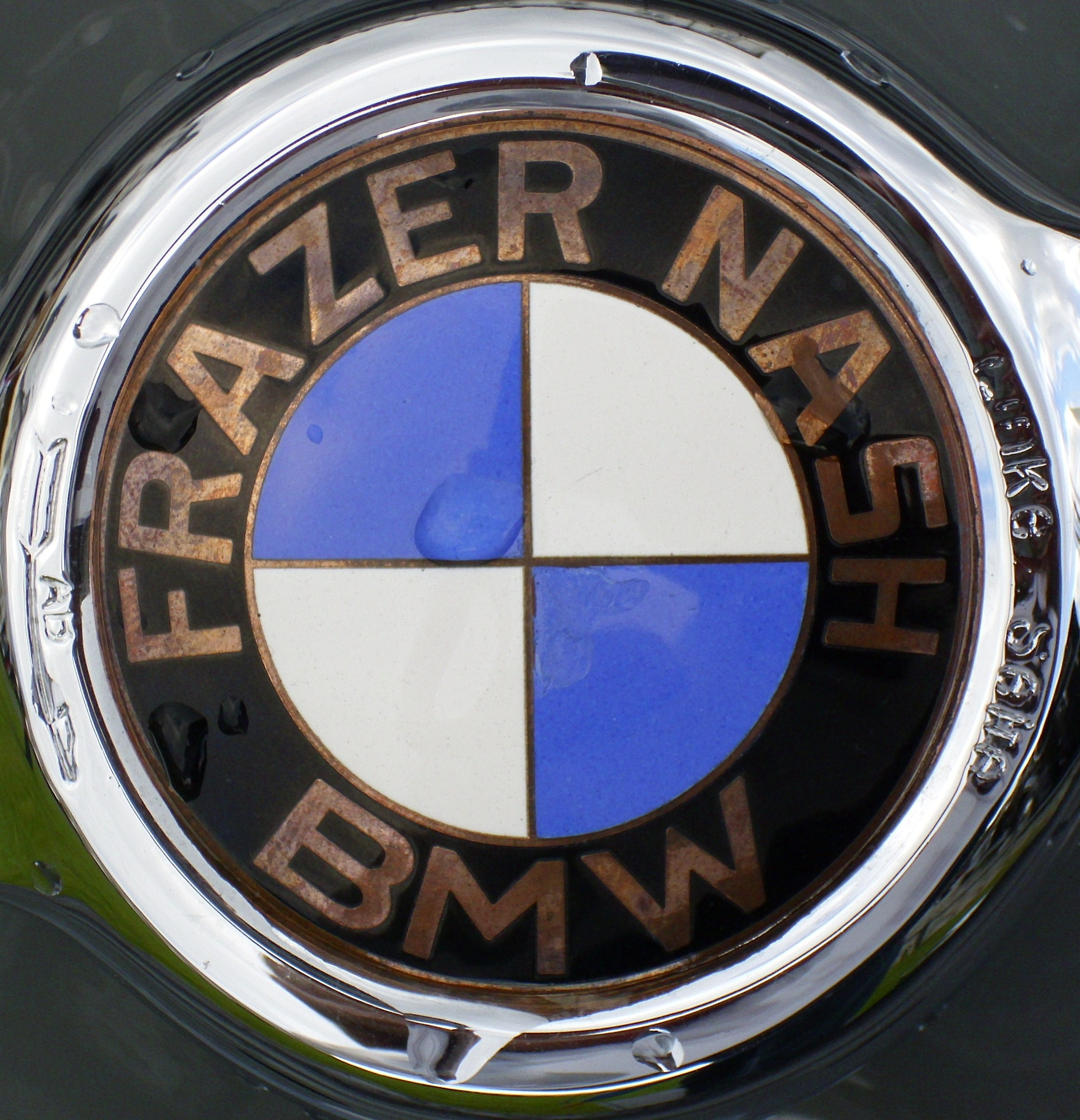
circa 1939

AFN Ltd became importers and assemblers of BMW cars in 1934 and sold them branded Frazer Nash BMW. They were the official British BMW importer until the outbreak of war in 1939.

=== Bristol BMW ===
In 1946 at the 36th Ordinary General Meeting of the Bristol Aeroplane Company it was announced that its Engine Division had acquired the majority of the shares in AFN Ltd. AFN Ltd produced about 85 more cars from 1948 to 1957. These cars were entirely unrelated to the chain-drive pre-war Frazer Nash but were largely a direct evolution of the sporting BMW 328 mentioned above.

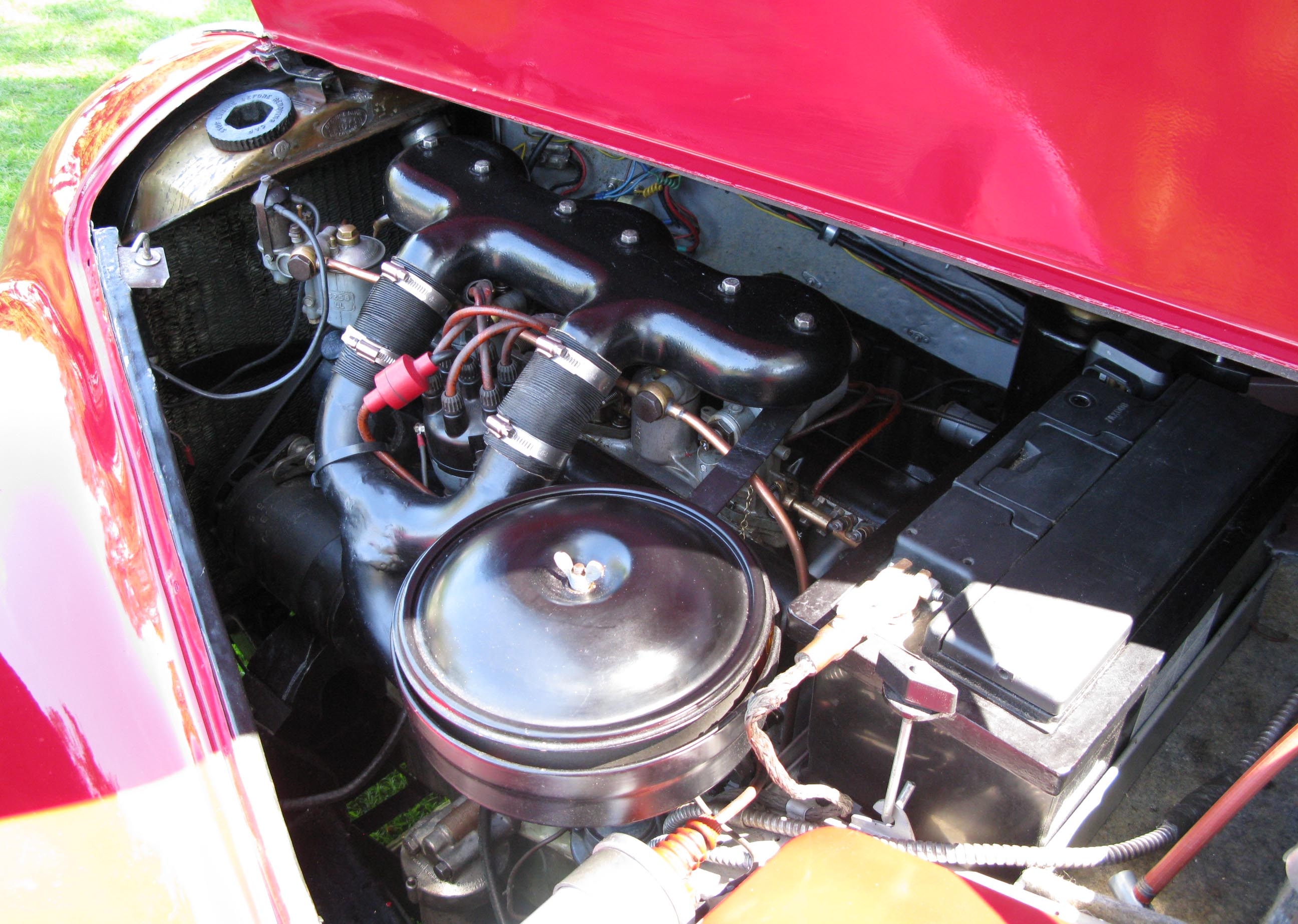
A Bristol 400 engine c. 1948

AFN, as owners of the UK rights to the 328 engine, licensed Bristol to make it against an agreement for its supply to them. Models include the Le Mans Replica, the Mille Miglia, the Targa Florio, the Le Mans Coupé and the Sebring. Competition successes included a third place at Le Mans (1949) and wins in the Targa Florio in 1951 and the 12 Hours of Sebring in 1952. The post-war cars are very highly prized by collectors.

Formula 2 cars produced by the company contested various races including four Grand Prix events counting towards the 1952 World Championship of Drivers. The cars were driven by Tony Crook and Ken Wharton.

=== Porsche ===
In 1954 AFN Limited added Porsche cars becoming the official importer for Great Britain in 1956. This lasted until 1965 when Porsche Cars Great Britain was set up. Aldington family members remained on the board of this company until John Aldington sold out to Porsche in 1987.

== Products ==
Considering the small number of cars made, the model range is vast and the following is not entirely comprehensive. Cars were all built to order and virtually any combination was possible. Some were rebuilt at the factory as different versions.

=== Pre-war models ===
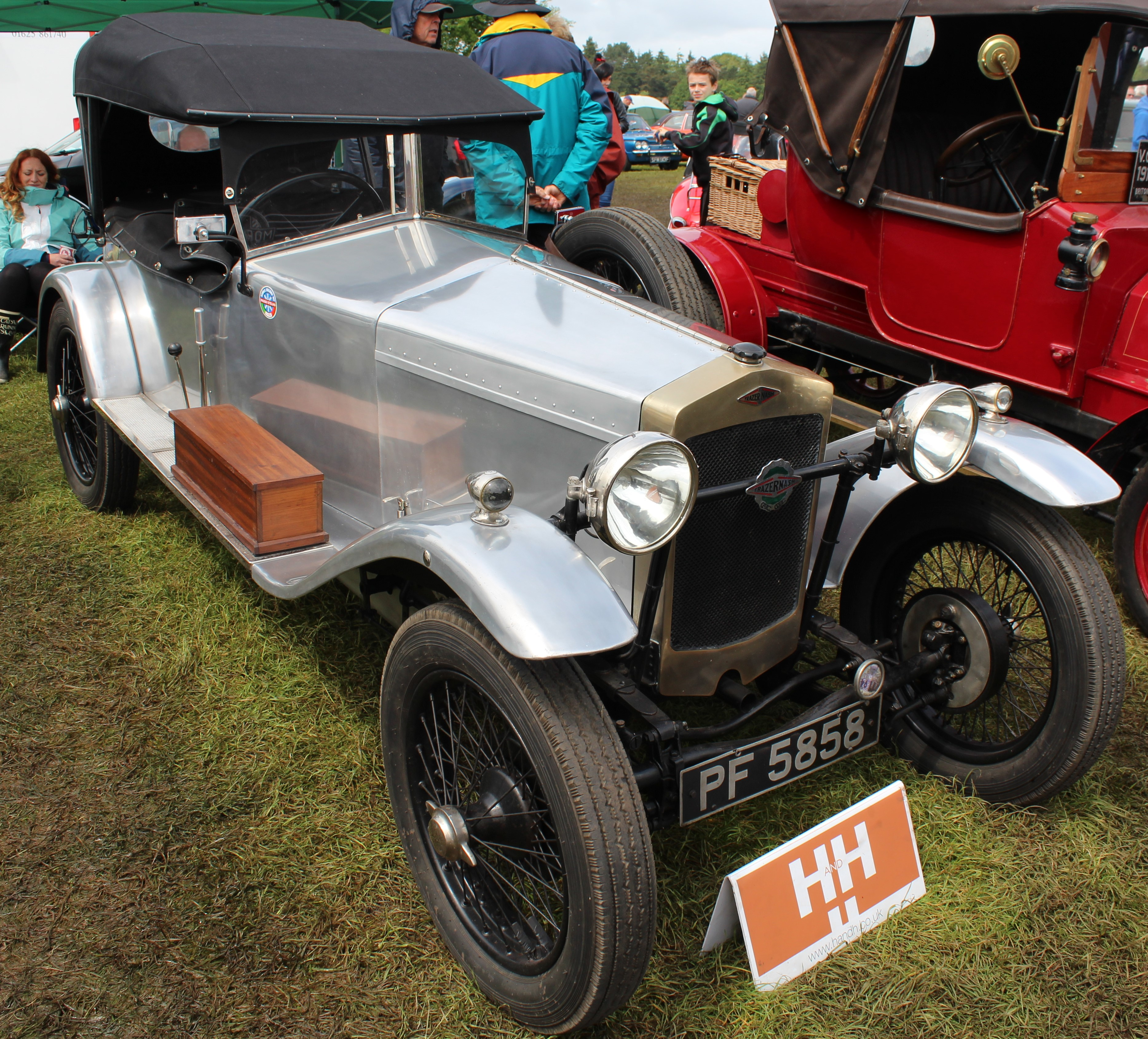
1926 Fast tourer

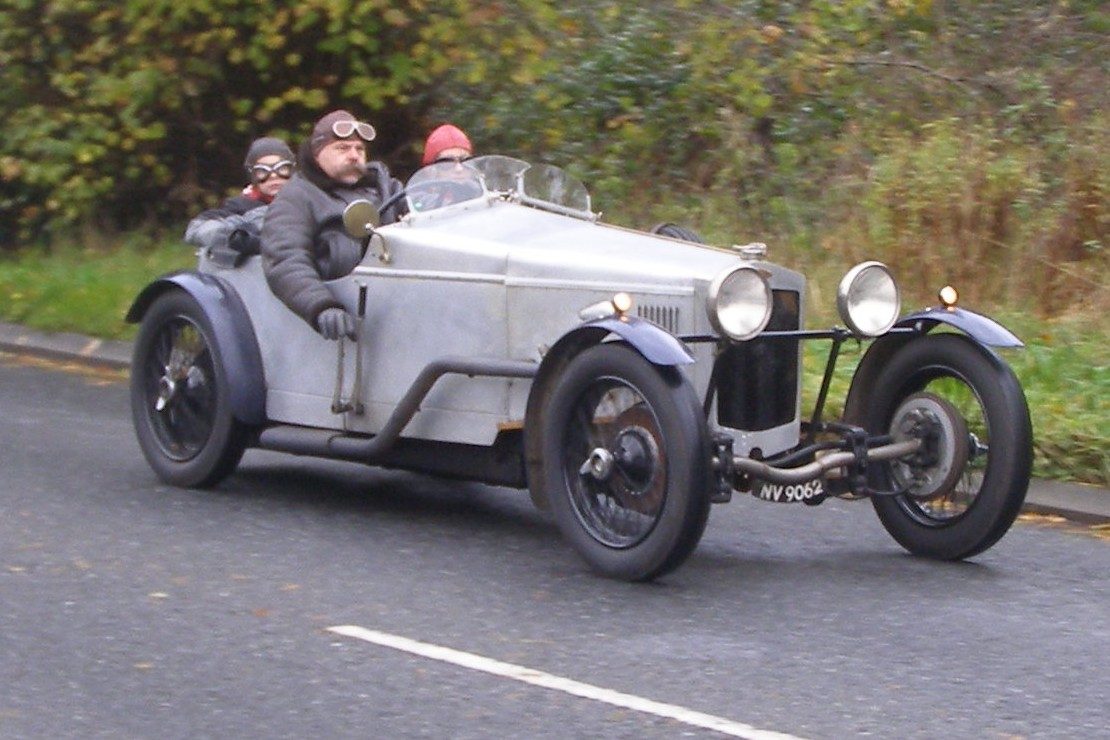
1929 Super Sports

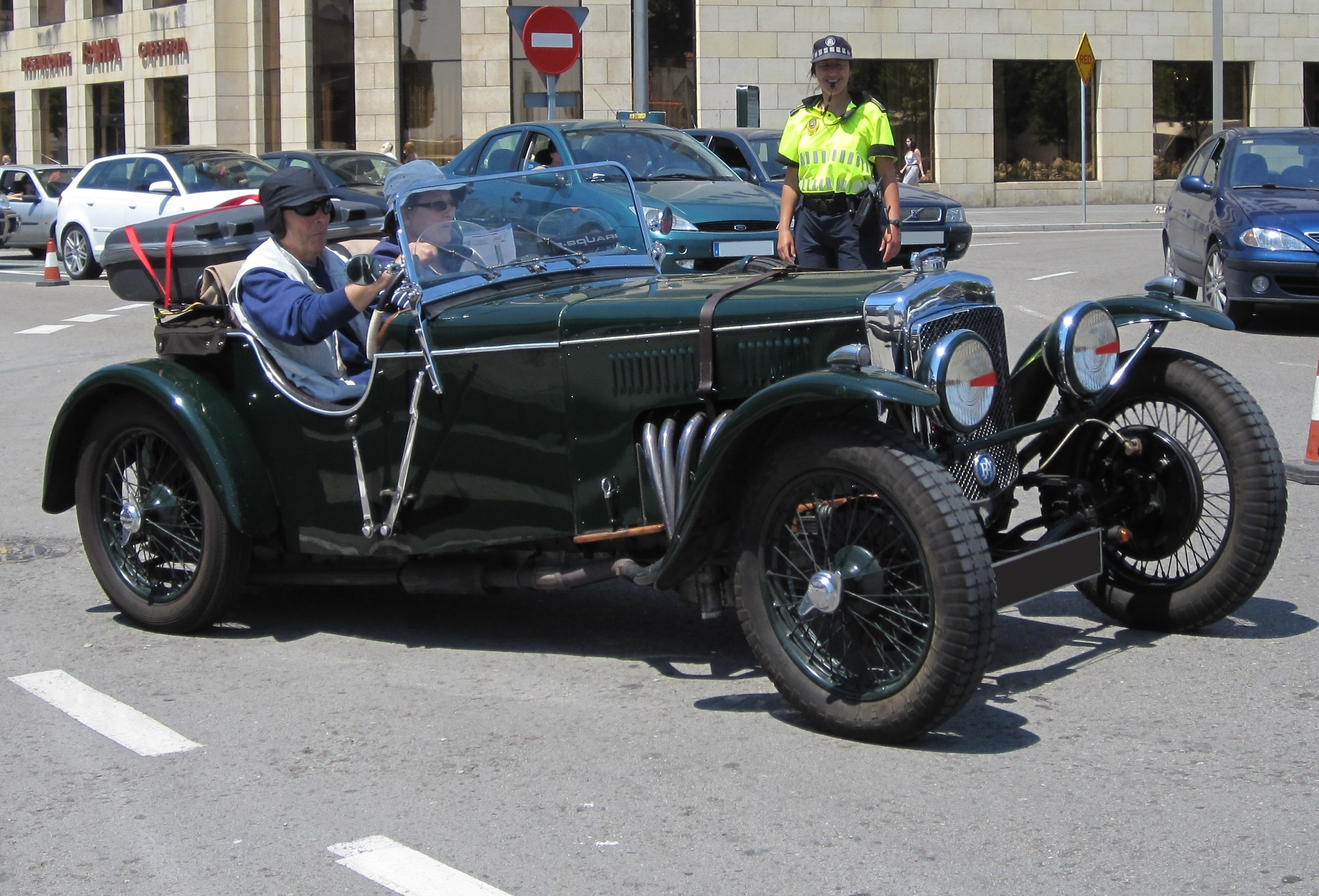
1933 Colmore

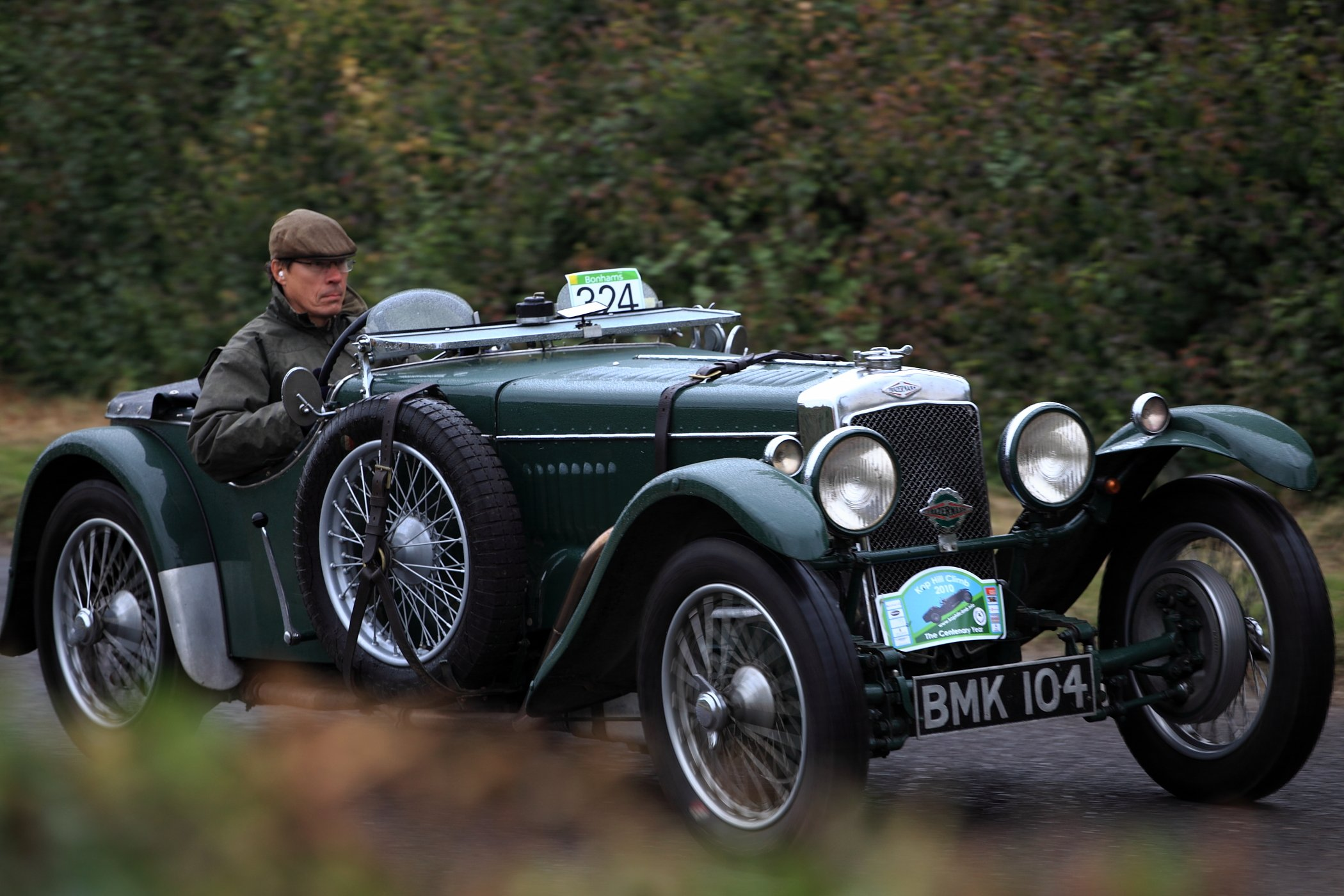
1934 TT Replica

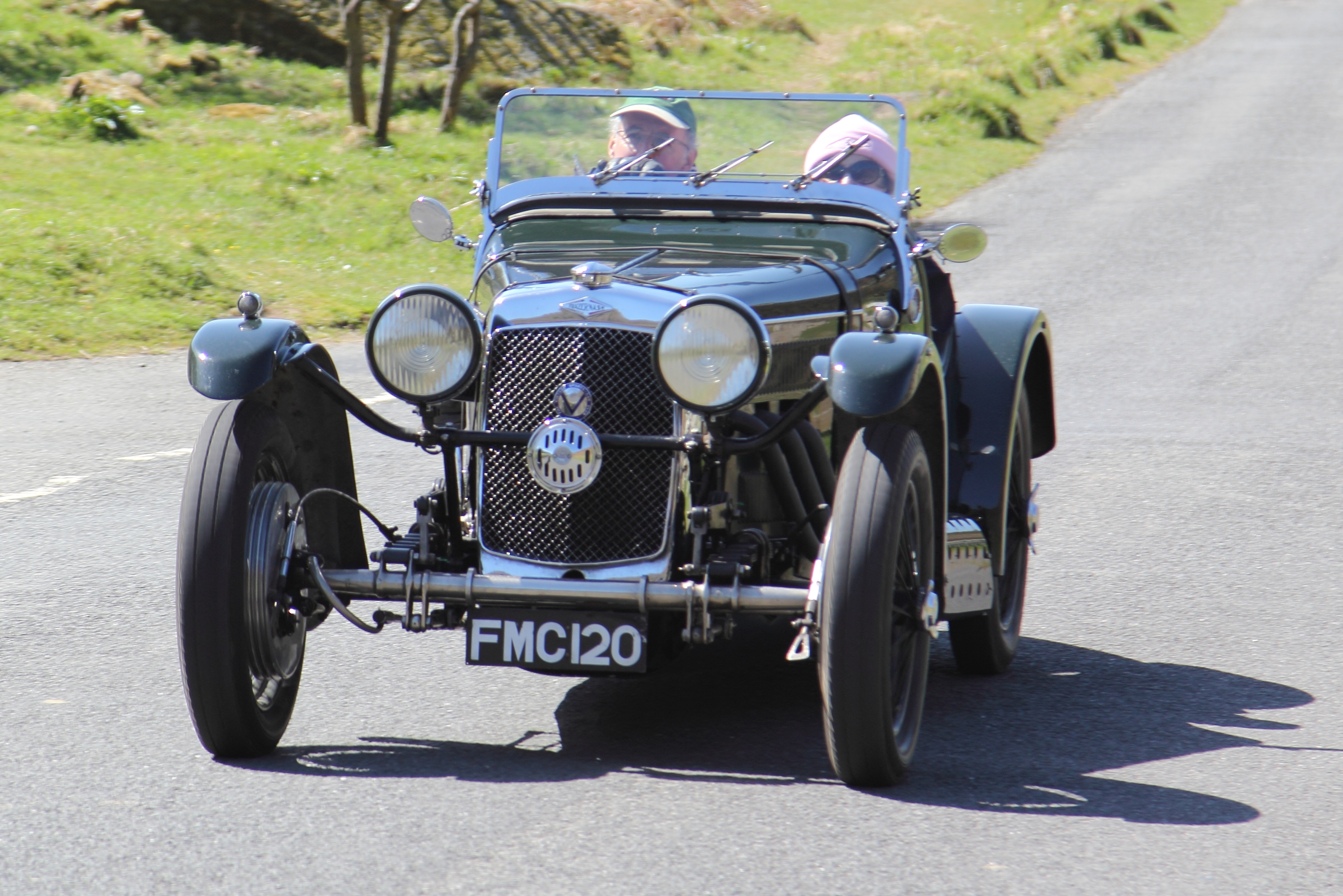
1936 Ulster 100

Type	Engine	Approx Production	Year	Notes
Frazer Nash Fast Tourer/Super Sports	1.5 L in line 4-cylinder	165 in the 1920s	1925–1930	engines were Plus Power, but mainly Anzani. Super Sports (from 1928) had no running boards. 105-inch (2,667 mm) wheelbase chassis on Fast Tourer and Super Sports with short 99-inch (2,515 mm) option on Super Sport.
Frazer Nash Interceptor/Sportop/Falcon	1.5 L in line 4-cylinder	25	1930–1932	Meadows engine. Sportop version was fabric bodied. Falcon had a better equipped body. Long and short chassis options.
Frazer Nash Boulogne I and II	1.5 L in line 4-cylinder	30	1926–1932	Anzani or Meadows engine. Supercharger optional. Long and short chassis options
Frazer Nash Ulster	1.5 L in line 4-cylinder	5	1929–1931	Competition version of the road cars. Long and short chassis options.
Frazer Nash Nūrburg	1.5 L in line 4-cylinder	3	1932–1933	Competition model. Tuned Meadows engine. No doors. Short chassis only.
Frazer Nash Exeter	1.5 L in line 4-cylinder	5	1932	Single carburettor Meadows engine. Short chassis only Corsica body.
Frazer Nash Colmore	1.5 L in line 4-cylinder or 1660 cc in line 6-cylinder	19	1932–1939	Four-seater. 105-inch (2,667 mm) or 108-inch (2,743 mm) wheelbase chassis options. Four-cylinder cars used a Meadows engine, six-cylinder cars a twin OHC Blackburne. Three or Four speed transmission.
Frazer Nash TT Replica	1.5 L in line 4-cylinder or 1660 cc in line 6-cylinder	83	1932–1938	Gough 4-cylinder engine used as well as the Meadows and Blackburne. 105-inch (2,667 mm) or 108-inch (2,743 mm) wheelbase chassis options
Frazer Nash Shelsley	1.5 L in line 4-cylinder or 1660 cc in line 6-cylinder	8	1934–1936	Gough (supercharger optional) or Blackburne engines. 108-inch (2,743 mm) wheelbase.
Frazer Nash Ulster 100	1.5 L in line 4-cylinder	1	1936–1937	Originally Anzani powered, later replaced by Gough engine and then a Meadows. Long rounded tail to body.
Frazer Nash Falcon	1.9 L in line 6-cylinder	1	1937	BMW-engined. 102-inch (2,591 mm) wheelbase.

=== Post-war models ===
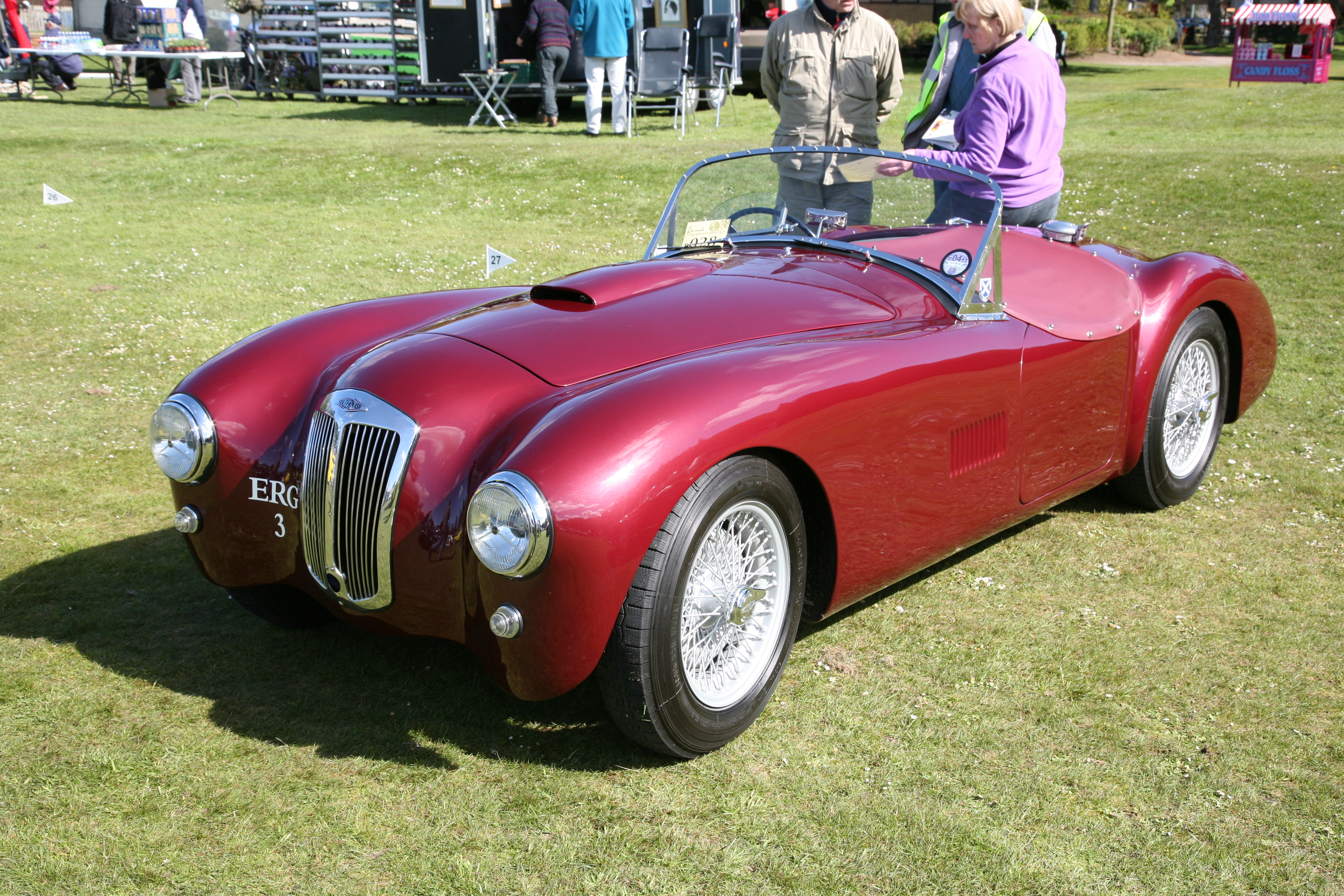
1951 Mille Miglia

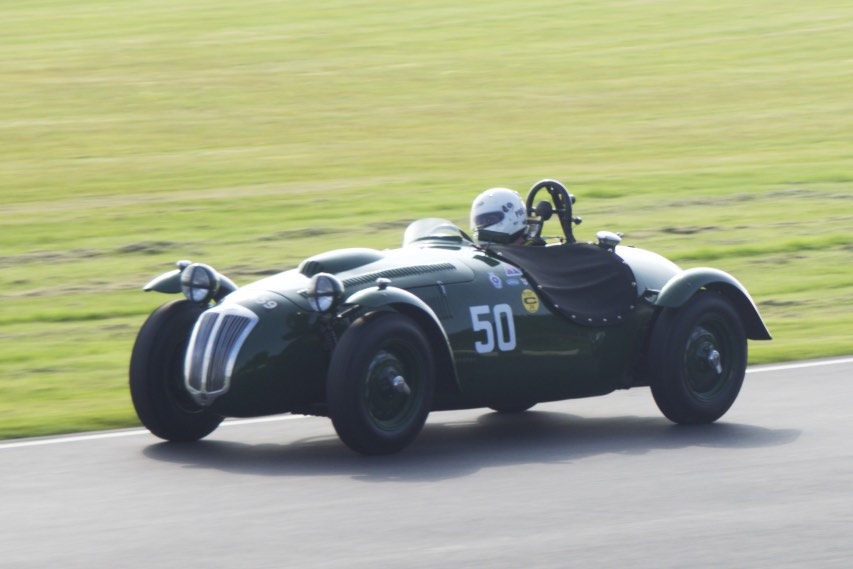
1953 Le Mans Replica

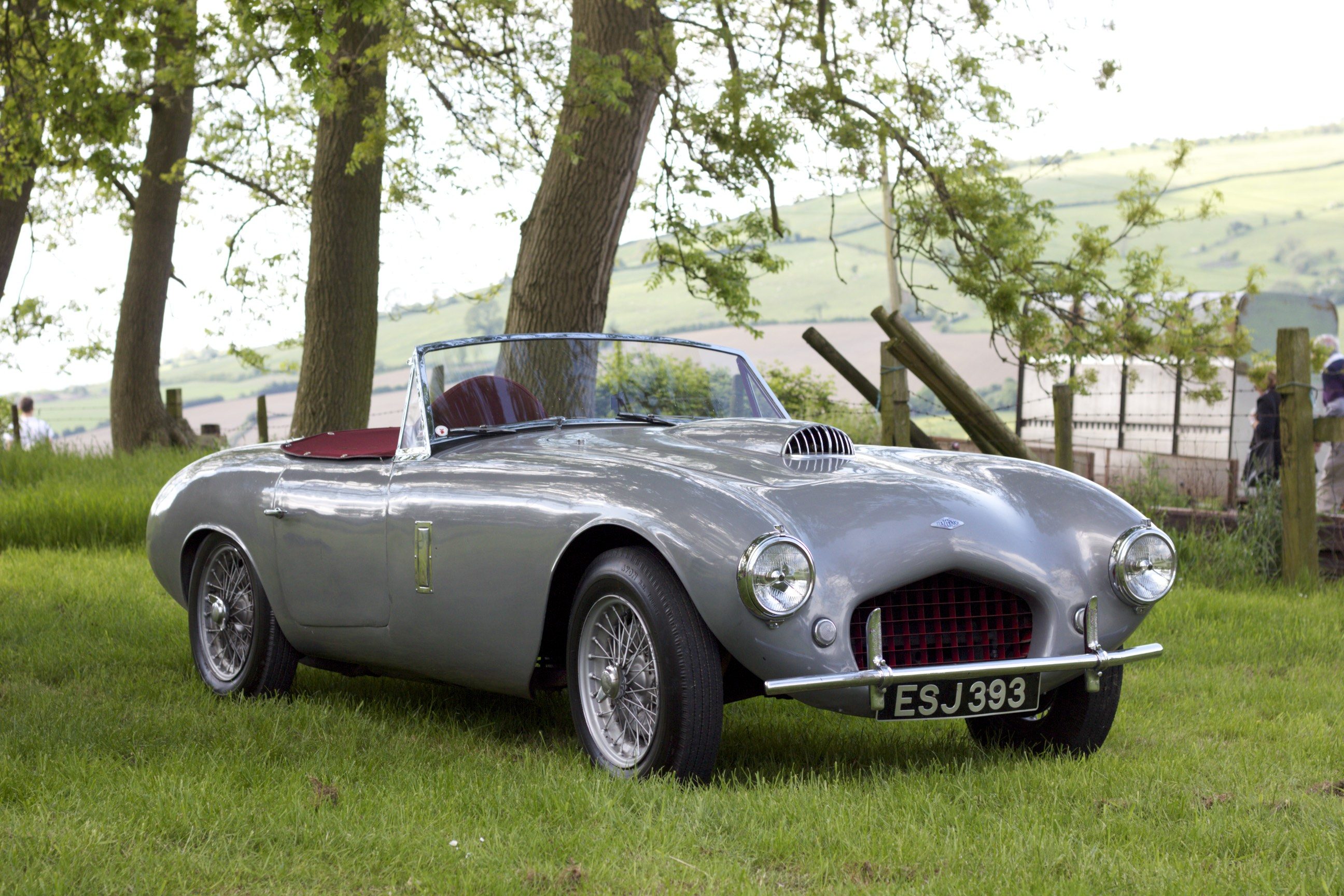
1954 Targa Florio Mk II

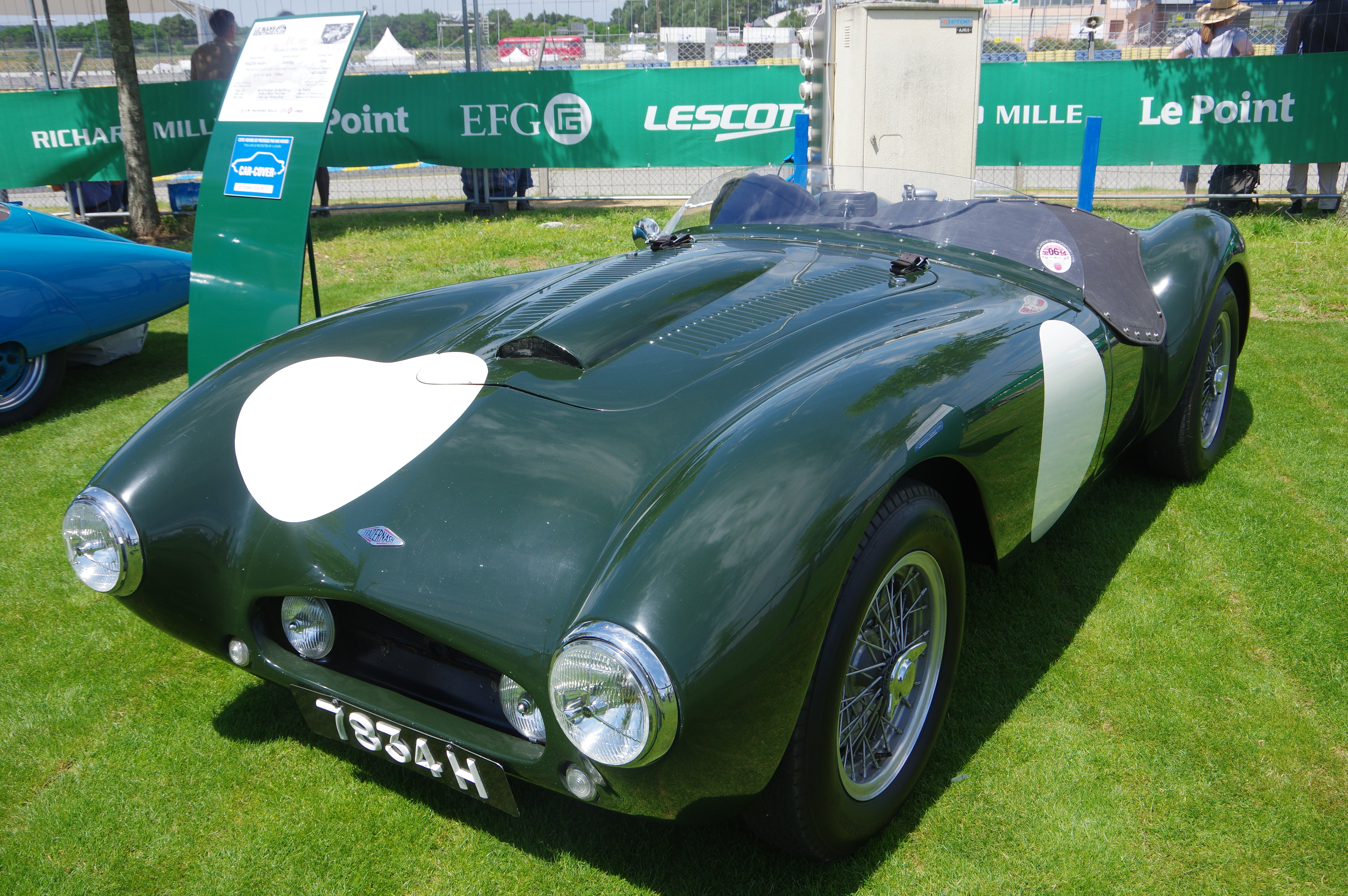
1954 Frazer Nash Sebring

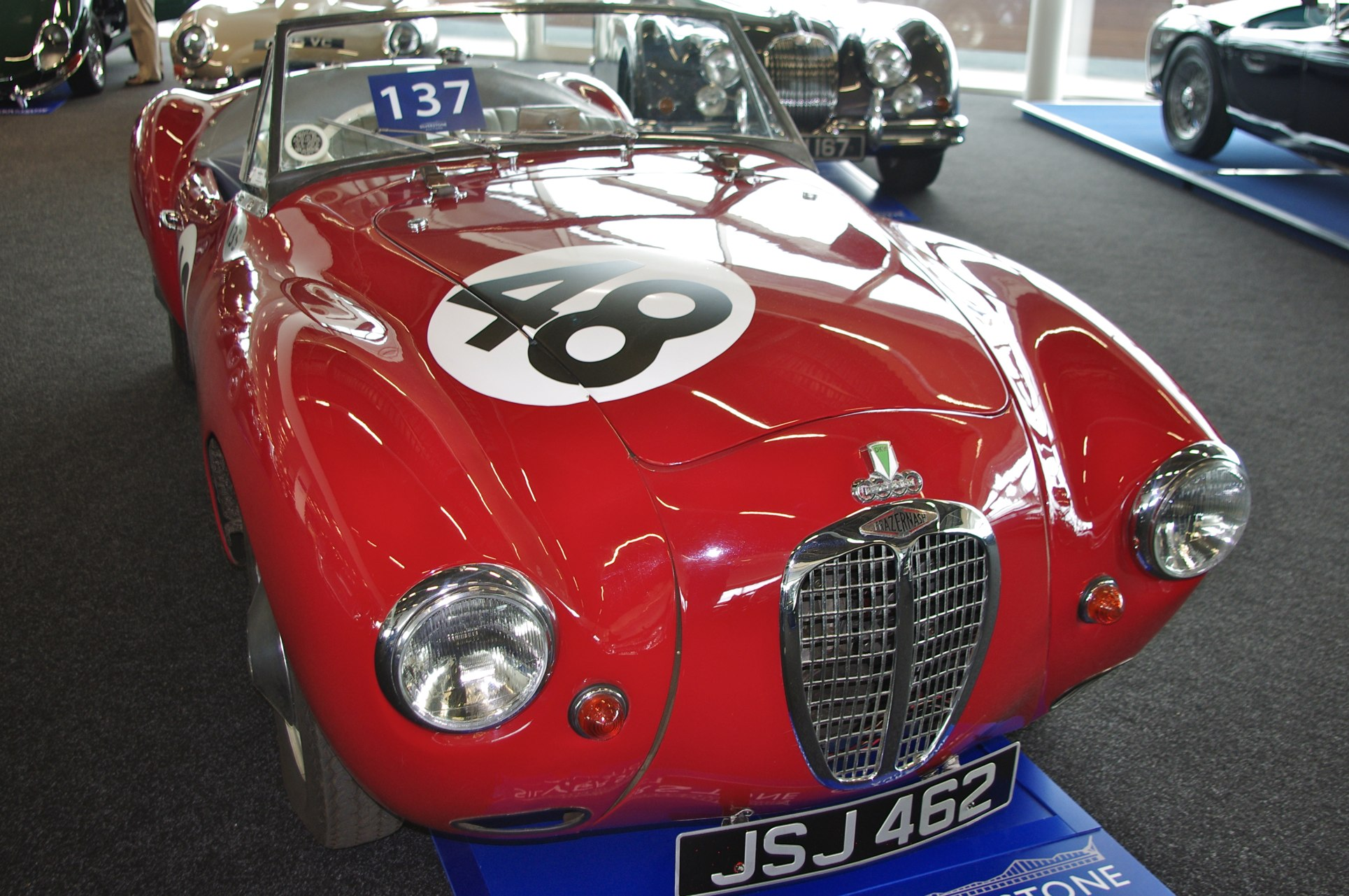
1955 DKW prototype

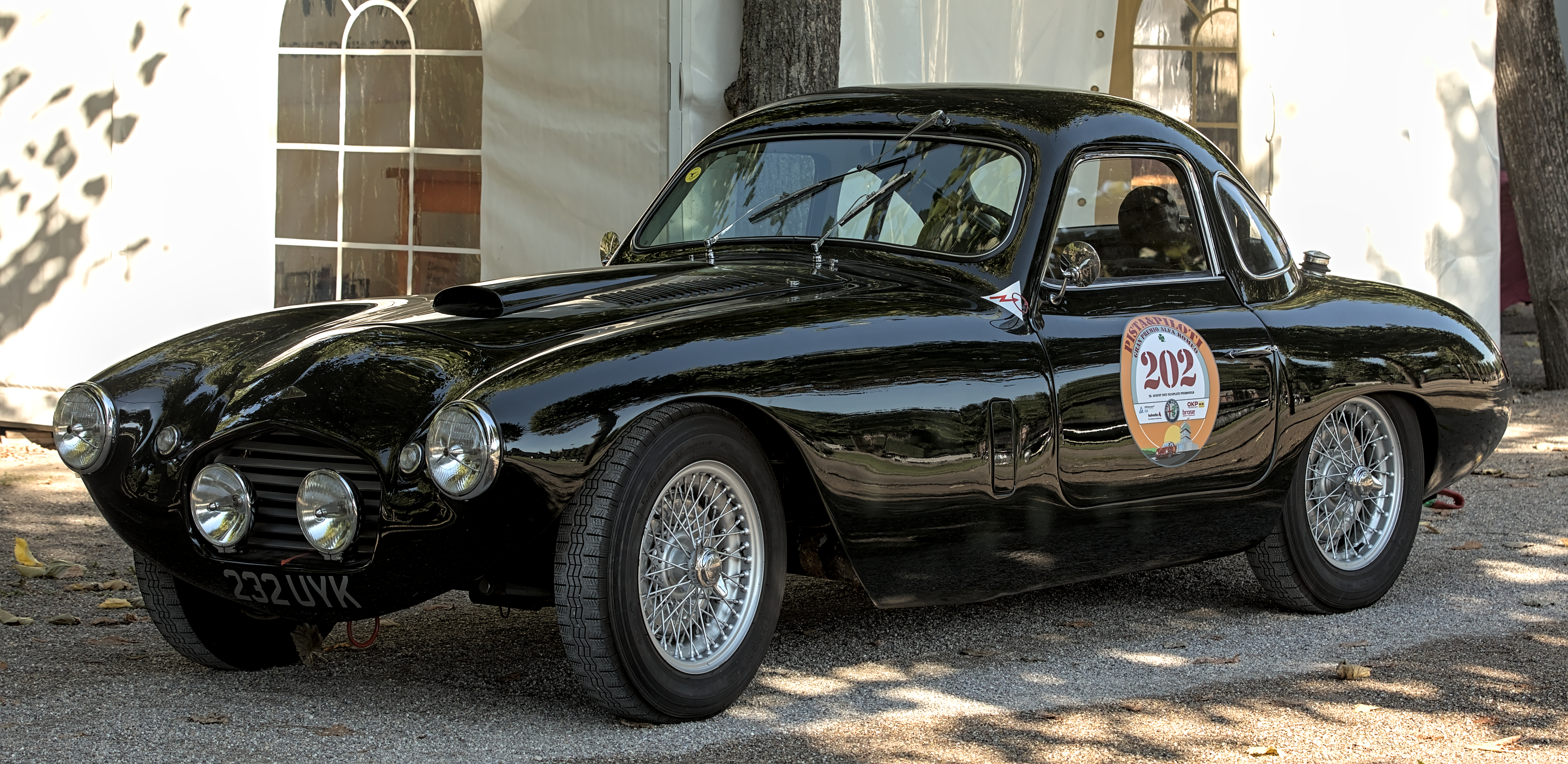
1955 Le Mans Coupé

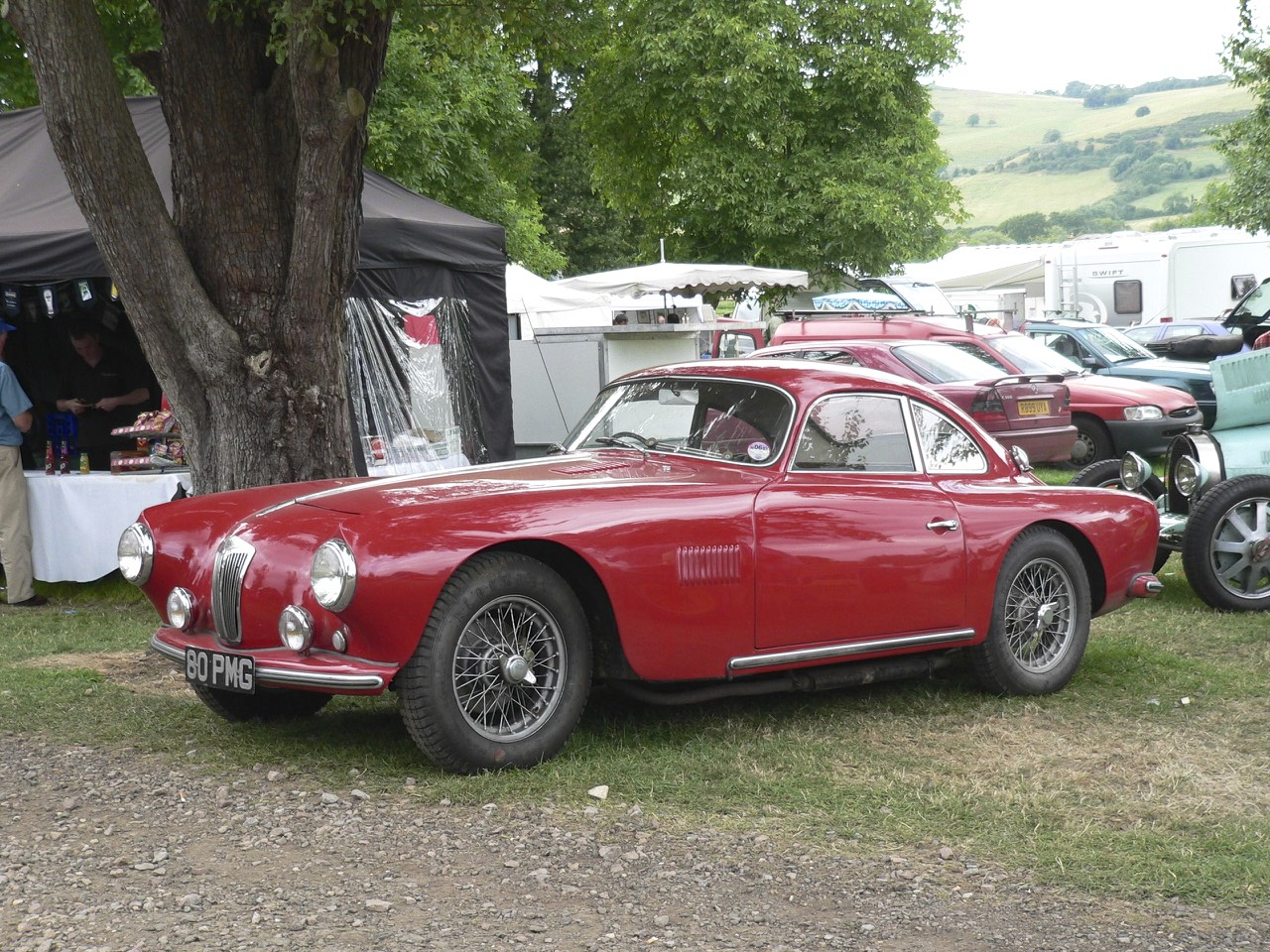
1957 Continental coupé

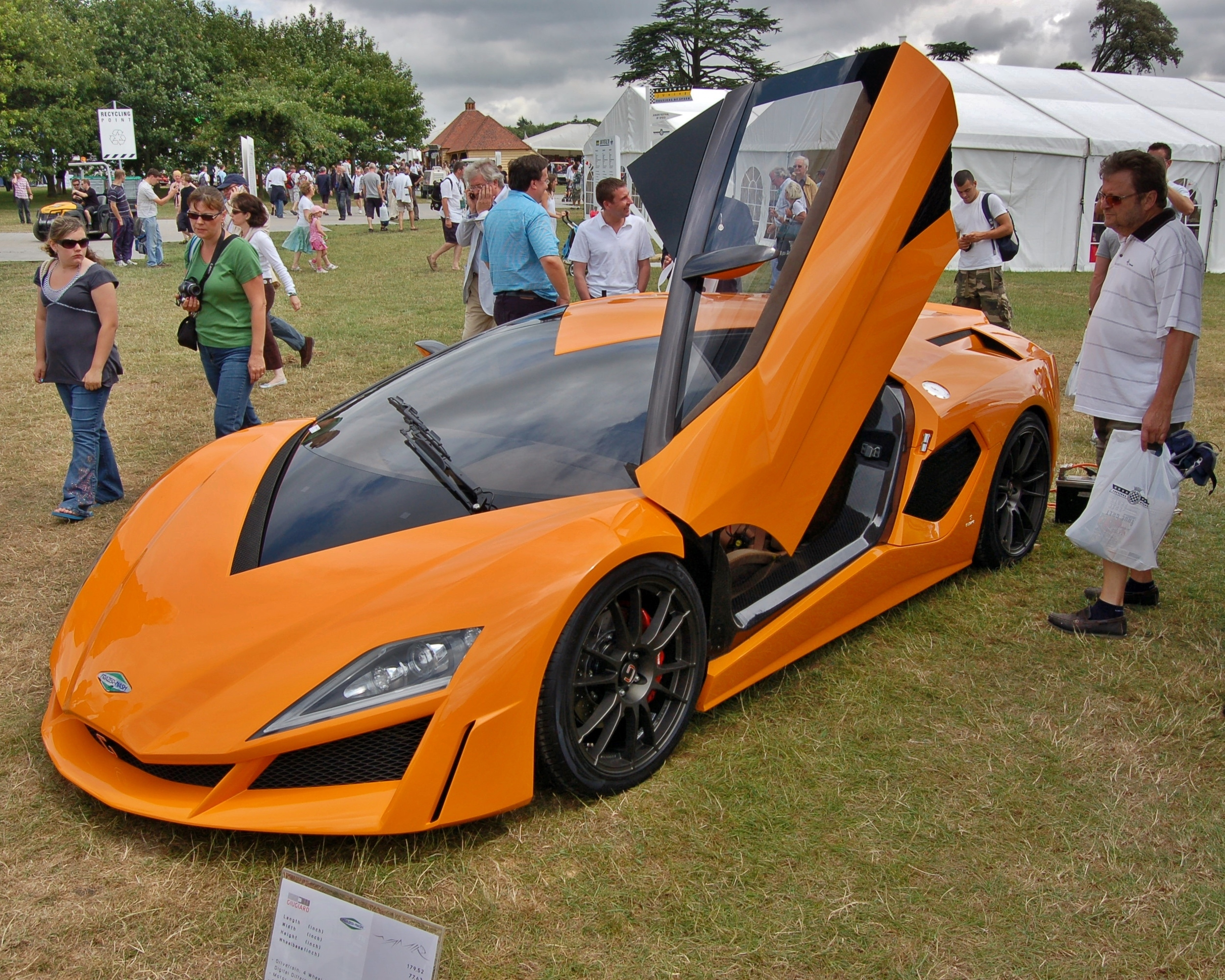
2009 Namir by Giugiaro

Type	Engine	Approx Production	Year	Notes
Frazer Nash Le Mans Replica/ Le Mans Mk II	Bristol engine (2 L in line 6-cylinder)	34	1948–1953	Originally named "High Speed" and "Competition". 96-inch (2,438 mm) wheelbase. Cycle wings. Conventional (Bristol) gearbox.
Frazer Nash Fast Tourer/Mille Miglia	Bristol engine (2 L in line 6-cylinder)	12	1948–1953	Full width body.
Frazer Nash FN48	Bristol engine (2 L in line 6-cylinder)	3	1952	Narrow body on Le Mans Replica chassis built to Formula 2 regulations. Also competed in World Championship Grand Prix and Formula Libre races.
Frazer Nash Targa Florio	Bristol engine (2 L in line 6-cylinder)	15	1952–1954	Turismo (100 hp (75 kW)) or Gran Sport (125 hp (93 kW)) Bristol engine options. One car fitted with Austin Atlantic engine. Last 5 cars were open versions of Le Mans Coupé.
Frazer Nash Le Mans Coupe	Bristol engine (2 L in line 6-cylinder)	9	1953–1955	100 hp (75 kW) or 140 hp (100 kW) engine.
Frazer Nash Sebring	Bristol engine (2 L in line 6-cylinder)	3	1954	Full width body on Le Mans Replica Mk II chassis. 140 hp (100 kW) engine.
Frazer Nash DKW	DKW 896 cc (water-cooled, three cylinder two-stroke)	1	1955	Essentially a sports version of the DKW Sonderklasse, which AFN also imported. As in that car, the engine is installed longitudinally and drives the front wheels. The car competed in the 1955 RAC Tourist Trophy without success, and was then laid up at the AFN works. It was brought back to life in 2008, and was featured in Classic & Sports Car, August 2011 issue.
Frazer Nash Continental	BMW engine (2.6 & 3.2 L)	2	1956–1957	V8 BMW engine. Listed at £3751 at the London Motor Show.
Frazer Nash Namir	Wankel AG LCR - 814 TGti (0.8L) + 4x Electric Motors	1	2009	A concept car born of the collaboration between Italdesign Giugiaro and Frazer-Nash

== Complete World Championship of Drivers results ==
Frazer Nash cars participated in four Grands Prix counting towards the World Championship of Drivers. Drivers of Frazer Nash cars scored 3 World Championship points.

All Grand Prix races counting towards the 1952 World Championship were restricted to Formula Two cars.

(key)

Year	Chassis	Engine	Tyres	Driver	1	2	3	4	5	6	7	8
1952	Frazer Nash FN48; Frazer Nash 421	Bristol Straight-6	D		SUI	500	BEL	FRA	GBR	GER	NED	ITA
1952	Frazer Nash FN48; Frazer Nash 421	Bristol Straight-6	D	Ken Wharton	4		Ret				Ret	
1952	Frazer Nash FN48; Frazer Nash 421	Bristol Straight-6	D	Tony Crook					21			

== World Sportscar Championship ==
Frazer Nash placed equal 13th in the 1953 World Sportscar Championship with a Le Mans model having finished sixth in the 1953 RAC Tourist Trophy.

== See also ==
- List of car manufacturers of the United Kingdom
