= List of Autodromo de Buenos Aires fatalities =

Fatal accidents to competitors at the Autódromo Juan y Oscar Gálvez, in Buenos Aires, Argentina during the 1000 km Buenos Aires and other national and international motor-sport events.

Eric Forrest-Greene died in the 1954 1000 km Buenos Aires, and Jorge Magnasco died in 1958 1000 km Buenos Aires, though they are not included because their accidents occurred on Avenida General Paz (the track was mixed).

== List of fatal accidents involving competitors ==
No	Competitor	Date	Place	Series	Race	Type
1	(Argentina) Felix Martinez	9 March 1952		Sports Car		MG TC
2	(Italy) Enrico Platé	31 January 1954	Box	Formula Libre	1954 Buenos Aires Grand Prix	
3	(United States) Harry Blanchard	31 January 1960		1960 World Sportscar Championship	1960 1000 km Buenos Aires	Porsche 718 RSK
4	(Uruguay) Alberico Passadore	16 February 1964	Curvon	Formula Junior	1964 Buenos Aires Grand Prix	Lotus 27
5	(Argentina) Jose Gimenez (co-driver)	17 August 1967	Curvon	Turismo Carretera	1967 TC Buenos Aires race	Ford F100 Prototype
6	(Italy) Ignazio Giunti	9 January 1971	Horquilla	World Sportscar Championship	1971 1000 km Buenos Aires	Ferrari 312PB
7	(Argentina) Alberto Beguerie	15 April 1978	Curvon Salotto	Turismo Carretera	1978 TC Buenos Aires race	Ford Falcon
8	(Argentina) Oscar Franciscángelo	2 September 1984	Ascari	Formula Renault Argentina	1984 Formula Renault Argentina race	
9	(Argentina) Fernando Cerdera	22 July 1990		Moto Max		

== List of fatal accidents involving race officials ==
No	Official	Date	Place	Series	Race	Role
1	(Argentina) Ricardo Kalhofer	10 January 1970	Ascari Corner	Sport cars	1970 1000 km Buenos Aires	Flag Marshal
2	(Argentina) Carlos Ortega	19 May 2019		Stock Car	PROCAR 4000	Flag Marshal

== List of fatal accidents involving spectators ==
Number fatalities	Driver	Date	Place	Series	Race
10 approximately	(Italy) Nino Farina (United Kingdom) Alan Brown	18 January 1953	Curva Nor Este	1953 Formula One season	1953 Argentine Grand Prix
