= 1959 SCCA National Sports Car Championship =

Seasons
- ← 1958 1960 →

The 1959 SCCA National Sports Car Championship season was the ninth season of the Sports Car Club of America's National Sports Car Championship. It began April 5, 1959, and ended November 15, 1959, after fourteen races.

== Schedule ==
Rnd	Race	Length^{A}	Circuit	Location	Date
1	SCCA National Races	90 mi (140 km)	Corry Field Naval Air Station	Pensacola, Florida	April 5
2	President's Cup	70 mi (110 km)	Marlboro Motor Raceway	Upper Marlboro, Maryland	April 19
3	VIR-Shrine National Championship Sports Car Races	200 km (120 mi)	Virginia International Raceway	Danville, Virginia	May 3
4	Cumberland National and Novice Sports Car Races	?	Greater Cumberland Regional Airport	Wiley Ford, West Virginia	May 17
5	Bridgehampton Road Race Course Sports Car Races	75 mi (121 km)	Bridgehampton Race Circuit	Bridgehampton, New York	May 31
6	International June Sprints	140 mi (230 km)	Road America	Elkhart Lake, Wisconsin	June 21
7	Lime Rock National Championship Races	50 km (31 mi)	Lime Rock Park	Lakeville, Connecticut	July 4
8	National Championship Sports Car Races	60 mi (97 km)	Buckley Field	Aurora, Colorado	July 12
9	Riverside National Championship Sports Car Races	65 mi (105 km)	Riverside International Raceway	Riverside, California	July 18
10	Montgomery National Championship Sports Car Races	150 km (93 mi)	Montgomery Airport	Montgomery, New York	August 9
11	Thompson National Championship Sports Car Races	60 mi (97 km)	Thompson International Speedway	Thompson, Connecticut	September 7
12	Road America 500	500 mi (800 km)	Road America	Elkhart Lake, Wisconsin	September 13
13	Watkins Glen Grand Prix	100 mi (160 km)	Watkins Glen International	Watkins Glen, New York	September 26
14	SCCA National Races	108 mi (174 km)	Daytona International Speedway	Daytona Beach, Florida	November 15

^A Feature race

== Season results ==
Feature race overall winners in bold.

Rnd	Circuit	BM Winning Team	BP Winning Team	CM Winning Team	CP Winning Team	DM Winning Team	DP Winning Team	EM Winning Team	EP Winning Team	FM Winning Team	FP Winning Team	GM Winning Team	GP Winning Team	HM Winning Team	HP Winning Team	IP Winning Team	JP Winning Team	Results
Rnd	Circuit	BM Winning Driver(s)	BP Winning Driver(s)	CM Winning Driver(s)	CP Winning Driver(s)	DM Winning Driver(s)	DP Winning Driver(s)	EM Winning Driver(s)	EP Winning Driver(s)	FM Winning Driver(s)	FP Winning Driver(s)	GM Winning Driver(s)	GP Winning Driver(s)	HM Winning Driver(s)	HP Winning Driver(s)	IP Winning Driver(s)	JP Winning Driver(s)	Results
1	Pensacola	unknown	#1 Chevrolet	**#41 E.D. Martin**	unknown	unknown	no entries	unknown	unknown	unknown	#0 Porsche	#28 Cooper-Climax	unknown	#76 Osca	unknown	unknown	unknown	Results
1	Pensacola	unknown	(United States) Jim Jeffords	**(United States) Edwin D. Martin**	unknown	unknown	no entries	unknown	unknown	unknown	(United States) Chuck Rickert	(United States) Charlie Kolb	unknown	(United States) James Eichenlaub	unknown	unknown	unknown	Results
2	Marlboro	#228 Chevrolet	Chevrolet	#60 Briggs Cunningham	Jaguar	Ferrari	unknown	no entries	A.C.-Bristol	**Porsche**	Porsche	Cooper-Climax	Alfa Romeo	#61 Team Roosevelt	#91 D.B.-Panhard	no entries	no entries	Results
2	Marlboro	(United States) Bud Gates	(United States) Jim Jeffords	(United States) Walt Hansgen	(United States) Louis Hatcher	(United States) Augie Pabst	unknown	no entries	(United States) Arch Means	**(United States) Don Sesslar**	(United States) Harry Blanchard	(United States) Charlie Kolb	(United States) John Guthrie	(United States) Ray Cuomo	(United States) Howard Hanna	no entries	no entries	Results
3	VIR	#36 Lister-Corvette	#1 Chevrolet	**#60 Briggs Cunningham**	#19 Ferrari	^{A}	#247 Austin-Healey	#24 Ferrari	#175 A.C.-Bristol	#74 Porsche	#77 Porsche	#37 Elva	#5 Alfa Romeo	#28 Osca	^{B}	#65 Team Roosevelt	^{C}	Results
3	VIR	(United States) Fred Windridge	(United States) Jim Jeffords	**(United States) Walt Hansgen**	(United States) Bob Grossman	^{A}	(United States) Fred Spross	(United States) William Burroughs	(United States) Ed Welch	(United States) Don Sesslar	(United States) Bruce Jennings	(United States) Art Tweedale	(United States) Chuck Stoddard	(United States) James Eichenlaub	^{B}	(United States) Paul Richards	^{C}	Results
4	Cumberland	#222 Sadler	#69 Chevrolet	**#60 Briggs Cunningham**	#29 Ferrari	#15 Ferrari	#247 Austin-Healey	#7 Maserati	#126 A.C.-Bristol	#140 Porsche	#58 Porsche	#2 Lotus	#123 Alfa Romeo	#23 Osca	#211 D.B.	#83 Fiat-Abarth	#137 Berkeley	Results
4	Cumberland	(Canada) Bill Sadler	(United States) Frank Dominianni	**(United States) Walt Hansgen**	(United States) Bob Grossman	(United States) James Johnston	(United States) Fred Spross	(United States) Charlie Kolb	(United States) Ross Wees	(United States) Bob Holbert	(United States) Bruce Jennings	(United States) M. R. J. Wyllie	(United States) Chuck Stoddard	(United States) Denise McCluggage	(United States) Ray Heppenstall	(United States) Paul Richards	(United States) Ed Wright	Results
5	Bridgehampton	#36 Kelso Auto Dynamics	#99 Chevrolet	**#60 Briggs Cunningham**	^{D}	#124 Alan Connell	#247 Austin-Healey	#25 Mike Garber	#80 A.C.-Bristol	#140 Porsche	#149 Porsche	#70 Lotus	#15 Alfa Romeo	#28 Osca	#50 D.B.-Panhard	#83 Fiat-Abarth	no entries	Results
5	Bridgehampton	(United States) Fred Windridge	(United States) Roy Tuerke	**(United States) Walt Hansgen**	^{D}	(United States) Alan Connell	(United States) Fred Spross	(Switzerland) Gaston Andrey	(United States) Harry Carter	(United States) Bob Holbert	(United States) Harry Blanchard	(United States) Tom Fleming	(United States) Tom O'Brien	(United States) James Eichenlaub	(United States) Ray Heppenstall	(United States) Paul Richards	no entries	Results
6	Road America	**#36 Kelso Auto Dynamics**	#1 John Stephani	#49 Elisha Walker	#38 Duke Knowlton	#12 Alan B. Connell, Jr.	#34 Tim Mayer	#76 Ted Baumgartner	#5 Harvey Woodward	#1 Bob Donner, Jr.	#49 Harry C. Blanchard	#13 John Miller	#77 William Wuesthoff	#9 Ed Walsh	#15 Ray Heppenstall	#83 Franklin D. Roosevelt, Jr.	#31 Derr L. Andrlik	Results
6	Road America	**(United States) Fred Windridge**	(United States) Jim Jeffords	(United States) George Constantine	(United States) Duke Knowlton	(United States) Alan Connell	(United States) Tim Mayer	(United States) Ted Baumgartner	(United States) Harvey Woodward	(United States) Bob Donner	(United States) Harry Blanchard	(United States) Alan Ross	(United States) Bill Wuesthoff	(United States) Ed Walsh	(United States) Ray Heppenstall	(United States) Paul Richards	(United States) Derr Andrlik	Results
7	Lime Rock	no entries	^{E}	**#49 Elisha Walker**	#9 Ferrari	^{F}	#171 Austin-Healey	#25 Mike Garber	#48 A.C.-Bristol	#74 Porsche	#149 Porsche	#35 Elva	#21 Alfa Romeo	#28 Osca	#90 D.B.	#83 Fiat-Abarth	no entries	Results
7	Lime Rock	no entries	^{E}	**(United States) George Constantine**	(United States) Bob Grossman^{E}	^{F}	(United States) John Colgate	(Switzerland) Gaston Andrey	(United States) Evelyn Mull	(United States) Don Sesslar	(United States) Harry Blanchard	(United States) Frank Baptista	(United States) Chuck Stoddard	(United States) James Eichenlaub	(United States) Ray Heppenstall	(United States) Paul Richards	no entries	Results
8	Buckley Field	**#10 Nickey Chevrolet**	#1 Chevrolet	^{G}	^{H}	#21 Ferrari	#73 Austin-Healey	#152 Lotus	#7 A.C.-Bristol	#171 Porsche	#162 Porsche	#19 Lola	#47 Alfa Romeo	#28 Osca	#90 D.B.	#83 Fiat-Abarth	no entries	Results
8	Buckley Field	**(United States) Jim Jeffords**	(United States) Jim Jeffords	^{G}	^{H}	(United States) Dan Collins	(United States) Charles Byerly	(United States) Jay Chamberlain	(United States) Bill Steele	(United States) Bob Donner	(United States) Michael Collins	(United States) Alan Ross	(United States) Bob Betts	(United States) James Eichenlaub	(United States) Ray Heppenstall	(United States) Paul Richards	no entries	Results
9	Riverside	no finishers	#51 Chevrolet	^{I}	#45 Mercedes-Benz	#46 Ferrari	^{J}	**#55 Porsche**	#77 A.C.-Bristol	#11 Porsche	#10 Porsche	#33 Lotus	#57 Alfa Romeo	#20 Lotus-Crosley	#90 D.B.	#5 Fiat-Abarth	no entries	Results
9	Riverside	no finishers	(United States) Bob Bondurant	^{I}	(United States) Dean Mears	(United States) Dick Morgensen^{I}	^{J}	**(United States) Sam Weiss**	(United States) Bill Steele	(United States) Bob Holbert	(United States) Chuck Parsons	(United States) Jack Reddish	(United States) Chuck Kessinger	(United States) Harry Jones	(United States) Ray Heppenstall	(United States) Dan Parkinson	no entries	Results
10	Montgomery	no finishers	#119 Chevrolet	**#49 Elisha Walker**	#14 Ferrari	#12 Alan Connell	#247 Austin-Healey	#72 Lotus	#59 A.C.-Bristol	#140 Porsche	#149 Porsche	#35 Elva	#85 Alfa Romeo	#123 Briggs Cunningham	#66 D.B.-Panhard	#82 Fiat-Abarth	no entries	Results
10	Montgomery	no finishers	(United States) Harold Keck	**(United States) George Constantine**	(United States) Bob Grossman	(United States) Alan Connell	(United States) Fred Spross	(United States) Sy Kaback	(United States) Pierre Mion	(United States) Bob Holbert	(United States) Harry Blanchard	(United States) Frank Baptista	(United States) Norman Webb	(United States) Denise McCluggage	(United States) William Loverre	(United States) Paul Richards	no entries	Results
11	Thompson	no entries	#99 Chevrolet	**#49 Elisha Walker**	#146 Ferrari	#12 Maserati	#247 Austin-Healey	#25 Ferrari	#180 A.C.-Bristol	#140 Porsche	#149 Porsche	#35 Elva	#110 Alfa Romeo	#123 Briggs Cunningham	#27 D.B	#83 Fiat-Abarth	no entries	Results
11	Thompson	no entries	(United States) Roy Tuerke	**(United States) George Constantine**	(United States) Dean McCarthy	(United States) Alan Connell	(United States) Fred Spross	(Switzerland) Gaston Andrey	(United States) Harry Carter	(United States) Bob Holbert	(United States) Harry Blanchard	(United States) Frank Baptista	(United States) John Kingsley	(United States) Phil Forno	(United States) Bud Fehnel	(United States) Paul Richards	no entries	Results
12	Road America	#64 John Staver	#2 Kack Stephani	**#62 Briggs Cunningham**	#47 Wayne Burnett	#57 William Sturgis	#24 Frank J. Opalka	#89 Pat Pigott	#73 Fritz Taylor	#6 Harry C. Blanchard	#0 Chuck Rickert	#37 Elva	#78 William Wuesthoff	#65 Briggs Cunningham	#22 Arthur W. Subberra	#83 Fiat-Abarth	^{K}	Results
12	Road America	(United States) John Staver (United States) Ed Grierson	(United States) Jim Jeffords	**(United States) Ed Crawford** **(United States) Walt Hansgen**	(United States) Wayne Burnett	(United States) William Sturgis (United States) Bob Bondurant	(United States) Frank Opalka	(United States) Pat Pigott (United States) Frank Becker	(United States) Fritz Taylor	(United States) Harry Blanchard (United States) Roger Penske	(United States) Chuck Rickert	(United States) Art Tweedale (United States) Walter Dickson	(United States) Bill Wuesthoff	(United States) Briggs Cunningham	(United States) Arthur Subberra	(United States) Paul Richards	^{K}	Results
13	Watkins Glen	#91 J. M. R. Lyeth, Jr.	#99 Robert M. Rosenthal	**#60 Briggs Cunningham**	#70 Mercedes-Benz	#213 Fredrick J. Hayes	#88 Glenn Carlson	#78 Millard Ripley	#97 Charles Kurtz	#6 Harry C. Blanchard	#111 Frank Wagenhofer	#13 John Miller	#211 George C. Rainville	#9 Osca	#179 Howard Hanna	#89 F.D. Roosevelt, Jr.	#76 Ellsworth L. Hall	Results
13	Watkins Glen	(United States) Richard Lyeth	(United States) Roy Tuerke	**(United States) Walt Hansgen**	(United States) Jerry Loman	(Canada) Fred Hayes	(United States) Glenn Carlson	(United States) Millard Ripley	(United States) Charles Kurtz	(United States) Harry Blanchard	(United States) Frank Wagenhofer	(United States) Alan Ross	(United States) Charlie Rainville	(United States) Ed Hugus	(United States) Howard Hanna	(United States) Paul Richards	(United States) Ellsworth Hall	Results
14	Daytona	no entries	#175 Chevrolet	**#12 Ferrari**	no entries	#90 Ferrari	^{L}	#16 Porsche	#157 A.C.-Bristol	^{M}	#94 Porsche	#37 Elva	#19 Alfa Romeo	#80 Fiat-Abarth	#9 D.B.	#83 Fiat-Abarth	no entries	Results
14	Daytona	no entries	(United States) Jack Evans Knab	**(United States) Alan Connell**	no entries	(United States) David Lane	^{L}	(United States) Chuck Cassel	(United States) Bill Dunn	^{M}	(United States) Ray Ruprecht	(United States) Art Tweedale	(United States) Ross Durant	(United States) Ray Cuomo	(United States) George Peck	(United States) Paul Richards	no entries	Results

^A D Modified were classified with C Modified at VIR.
^B H Production were classified with G Production at VIR.
^C J Production were classified with I Production at VIR.
^D C Production were classified with B Production at Bridgehampton.
^E B and C Production were classified together at Lime Rock; the combined class was won by Bob Grossman's CP Ferrari. The highest-finishing BP car was Roy Tuerke's Chevrolet Corvette in 2nd.
^F D Modified were classified with C Modified at Lime Rock.
^G C Modified were classified with B Modified at Buckley Field.
^H C Production were classified with B Production at Buckley Field.
^I C and D Modified were classified together at Riverside; the combined class was won by Dick Morgensen's DP Ferrari. The highest-finishing CP car was Jack Eubank's Talbot-Lago in 3rd.
^J D Production were classified with C Production at Riverside.
^K J Production were classified with I Production at the Road America 500.
^L D Production were classified with B Production at Daytona.
^M F Modified were classified with E Modified at Daytona.

== Champions ==
Class	Driver	Car
B Modified	(United States) John Staver	Echidna-Chevrolet
B Production	(United States) Jim Jeffords	Chevrolet Corvette
C Modified	(United States) Walt Hansgen	Lister-Jaguar
C Production	(United States) Bob Grossman	Ferrari 250 GT California
D Modified	(United States) Alan Connell	Ferrari 250 TR, Maserati 250S
D Production	(United States) Fred Spross	Austin-Healey 100-6
E Modified	(Switzerland) Gaston Andrey	Ferrari 500 TR
E Production	(United States) Pierre Mion	AC Ace-Bristol
F Modified	(United States) Don Sesslar	Porsche 718 RSK
F Production	(United States) Harry Blanchard	Porsche 356 Carrera GT
G Modified	(United States) Art Tweedale	Elva Mk IV
G Production	(United States) Chuck Stoddard	Alfa Romeo Giulietta Spyder
H Modified	(United States) James Eichenlaub	Osca 750, Osca 187S
H Production	(United States) Ray Heppenstall	D.B.-Panhard
I Production	(United States) Paul Richards	Fiat-Abarth Zagato
J Production	(United States) Ed Wright	Berkeley SE Excelsior
