= 1960 1000 km Nürburgring =

Sports car endurance race in Germany

The VI. Internationales ADAC 1000 Kilometer Rennen took place on 22 May, on the Nürburgring Nordschleife, (West Germany). It was the fourth round of the F.I.A. World Sports Car Championship. This was also the third round of the FIA GT Cup.

Nürburgring Nordschleife

== Report ==
=== Entry ===
A massive total of 85 racing cars were registered for this event, of which 73 arrived for practice and 67 started the long-distance race on the 14.174 mile German circuit. David Brown and Aston Martin had won the event in 1957 and again in 1958 and 1959 but had withdrawn from Sports Car racing, leaving its lead driver, Stirling Moss without a works drive. He hope to complete his hat-trick of race wins on the Nordschleife, laid with the American outfit, Camoradi USA with their Maserati Tipo 61. As for championship leaders, Porsche, this was their home event arrived with two different cars; 356 B and 718 RS 60 for their squad of drivers led by Olivier Gendebien and Jo Bonnier.

Scuderia Ferrari would head the Italian challenge. Ferrari had four works 250 TR 59/60s in the Eifel mountains, Cliff Allison, Willy Mairesse, Phil Hill and Wolfgang von Trips were amongst the squad of drivers. They were joined a fleet of privateer drivers in their Alfa Romeos, Porsche 356A Carreras Oscas and other mainline sports and GT cars.

=== Race ===
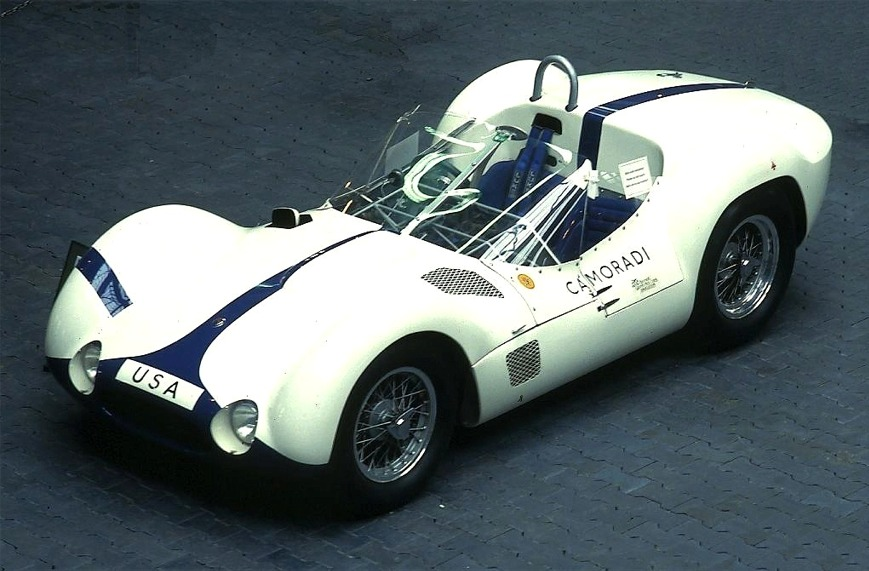
Maserati Tipo 61, similar to that driven by Moss and Gurney to victory

With each lap 14.189 miles in length, the race covered a total of 44 laps, or 1,004.739 km (624.316 mi), the Nordschleife was a fearsome thing to behold. A crowd of approximately 250,000 in attendance came to witness the race, despite a day of rain.

As for the race, victory went to the Maserati Tipo 61 of Moss and Gurney, gaining the Englishman his third win in a row in the mountains. The winning partnership, won in a time of 7hr 31:40.5 mins., averaging a speed of 82.843 mph. The margin of triumph over the Porsche of Bonnier/Gendebein was 2 mins 52secs.

== Official Classification ==
Class Winners are in Bold text.

Pos	No	Class	Driver		Entrant	Chassis	Laps	Reason Out
1st	**5**	**S3.0**	(United Kingdom) **Stirling Moss**	(United States) **Dan Gurney**	**Camoradi/USA Racing Team**	**Maserati Tipo 61**	**7hr 31:40.5, 44**	
2nd	**21**	**S2.0**	(Sweden) **Jo Bonnier**	(Belgium) **Olivier Gendebien**	**Dr. Ing. h. c. F. Porsche KG.**	**Porsche 718 RS 60**	**7hr 34:32.9, 44**	
3rd	2	S3.0	(United Kingdom) Cliff Allison (United States) Phil Hill	(Belgium) Willy Mairesse	Scuderia Ferrari	Ferrari 250 TR 59/60	7hr 35:44.1, 44	
4th	23	S2.0	(West Germany) Hans Herrmann	(France) Maurice Trintignant	Dr. Ing. h. c. F. Porsche KG	Porsche 718 RS 60	**7hr 37:57.7, 44**	
5th	6	S3.0	(United States) Masten Gregory	(Italy) Gino Munaron	Camoradi/USA Racing Team	Maserati Tipo 61	43	
6th	**36**	**S1.6**	(Switzerland) **Heini Walter**	(Switzerland) **Thomas Losinger**	**Heinrich Walter**	**Porsche 718 RSK**	**42**	
7th	31	S1.6	(West Germany) Sepp Greger	(West Germany) Herbert Linge	Dr. Ing. h. c. F. Porsche KG.	Porsche 356 B Carrera GTL Abarth	41	
8th	**77**	**GT+2.0**	(Italy) **Carlo Maria Abate**	(United Kingdom) **Colin Davis**	**Scuderia Serenissima**	**Ferrari 250 GT LWB**	**41**	
9th	34	S1.6	(Netherlands) Carel Godin de Beaufort	(France) Paul Frère	Ian Frazer-Jones	Porsche 718 RS 60	40	
10th	**83**	**GT2.0**	(West Germany) **Paul-Ernst Strähle**	(West Germany) **Hans-Joachim Walter**	**Paul-Ernst Strähle**	**Porsche 356 B Carrera GTL Abarth**	**40**	
11th	72	GT+2.0	(Belgium) Lucien Bianchi	(France) Jo Schlesser	Jo Schlesser	Ferrari 250 GT LWB Interim	40	
12th	84	GT2.0	(West Germany) Karl Braun	(West Germany) “Robert Schwarz”	Karl Braun	Porsche 356 B Carrera	40	
13th	85	GT2.0	(West Germany) Gerhard Koch	(West Germany) Hans-August Stausberg	Scuderia Colonia	Porsche 356 B Carrera GTL Abarth	40	
14th	82	GT2.0	(West Germany) Fritz Hahnl, Jnr,	(West Germany) Helmut Zick	Camoradi/USA Racing Team	Porsche 356 B Carrera	40	
15th	11	S3.0	(Belgium) ”Jean Beurlys”	(Belgium) Pierre Noblet	Ecurie Francorchamps	Ferrari 250 GT SWB	40	
16th	89	GT2.0	(Switzerland) Heinz Schiller	(Switzerland) Nadège Ferrier	Ecurie Leman	Porsche 356 B Carrera	40	
17th	**53**	**S1.15**	**(Switzerland) Charles Vögele**	**(United Kingdom) Peter Ashdown**	**Charles Vögele**	**Lola-Climax Mk.1**	**40**	
18th	24	S2.0	(United Kingdom) Keith Greene	(United Kingdom) Douglas Graham	Taylor and Crawley Racing Team	Lotus-Climax 15	40	
19th	32	S1.6	(West Germany) Helmut Schulze	(West Germany) Wittigo Einsiedel	Dr. Ing. h. c. F. Porsche KG.	Porsche 356 B Super 90	39	
20th	**117**	**GT1.3**	**(United Kingdom) Alan Stacey**	**(United Kingdom) John Wagstaff**	**Team Elite**	**Lotus Elite**	**39**	
21st	115	GT1.3	(United Kingdom) Peter Lumsden	(United Kingdom) Peter Sargent	Peter J. S. Lumsden	Lotus Elite	39	
22nd	9	S3.0	(United Kingdom) Ian Baillie	(United Kingdom) Edward Greenall	Major I. B. Bailie	Aston Martin DBR1/300	39	
23rd	17	GT2.0	(Italy) Carlo Peroglio	(Italy) Piero Frescobaldi	Scuderia Serenissima	Ferrari 250 GT LWB	38	
24th	55	S1.15	(United Kingdom) Bill de Selincourt	(United Kingdom) Chris Lawrence	R. W. de Selincourt	Lola-Climax Mk.1	38	
25th	52	S1.15	(United Kingdom) Bob Hicks	(United Kingdom) David Hitches	David Hitches	Lola-Climax Mk.1	38	
26th	86	GT2.0	(West Germany) Heinrich Hülbüsch	(West Germany) Joachim Springer	Heinrich Hülbüsch, Jr.	Porsche 356 B Carrera	38	
27th	25	S2.0	(United Kingdom) Mike Taylor	(United Kingdom) Christopher Martyn	Taylor and Crawley Racing Team	Lotus-Climax 15	38	
28th	101	GT1.3	(Argentina) Karl Stangl	(West Germany) Bernd Degner	Karl Stangl	Alfa Romeo Giulietta Sprint Speciale	37	
29th	54	S1.15	(United Kingdom) Eric Broadley	(United Kingdom) David Bertram	D. McNab Bertram	Lola-Climax 15	37	
30th	51	S1.15	(France) Hughes Hazard	(France) Maurice van der Bruwaene	Automobile D.B. Deutsche Bonnet	D.B.-Panhard HBR5	37	
31st	111	GT1.3	(Belgium) Georges Berger	(Belgium) Andrè Roggemans	Ecurie Azur	Alfa Romeo Giulietta Sprint Veloce Zagato	37	
32nd	121	GT1.3	(United States) George Kreisel	(United States) Ed Schaffer	George R. Kreisel, Jr.	Lotus Elite	36	
33rd	93	GT2.0	(United Kingdom) Bob Staples	(United Kingdom) Richard Shepherd-Barron	Rudd's Racing Team Ltd.	AC Ace	36	
34th	109	GT1.3	(Belgium) Georges Hacqiun	(Belgium) Pierre Henriquet	Georges Hacqiun	Alfa Romeo Giulietta Veloce	36	
35th	74	GT+2.0	(West Germany) Hans-Günther John	(West Germany) Günther Isenbügel	Hans-Günther John	Mercedes-Benz 300 SL	36	
36th	**62**	**S850**	(France) **René Bartholoni**	(France) **Jean Vinatier**	**Automobile D.B. Deutsche Bonnet**	**D.B.-Panhard HBR5**	**36**	
37th	88	GT2.0	(West Germany) Hullmuth Gerhards	(West Germany) Hullmuth Gerhards, Jr	Hullmuth Gerhards	Porsche 356 B Super 90	35	
38th	57	S1.15	(United Kingdom) Cyril Simson	(Australia) Paul Hawkins	Team 221	Austin-Healey Sebring Sprite	35	
DNF	1	S3.0	(West Germany) Wolfgang von Trips	(United States) Phil Hill	Scuderia Ferrari	Ferrari 250 TRI/60	34	Engine
39th	61	S850	(France) Gérard Laureau	(France) François Jaeger	Automobile D.B. Deutsche Bonnet	D.B.-Panhard HBR5	33	
40th	122	GT1.3	(France) Bernard Consten	(France) José Rosinski	Bernard Consten	Alfa Romeo Giulietta Veloce	33	
41st	63	S850	(Italy) Mario Poltonieri	(United States) Leo Levine	Scuderia Sant'Ambroeus	Fiat-Abarth 850	32	
DNF	27	S2.0	(Mexico) Ricardo Rodríguez	(Mexico) Pedro Rodríguez	P. u. R. Rodríguez	Dino 196 S	31	Engine
DNF	30	S1.6	(East Germany) Edgar Barth	(United Kingdom) Graham Hill	Dr. Ing. h. c. F. Porsche KG	Porsche 718 RS 60	28	Accident
DNF	119	GT1.3	(United Kingdom) Mike Parkes	(United Kingdom) Gawaine Baillie	Sir Gawaine Baille	Lotus Elite	28	Accident
DNF	116	GT1.3	(United Kingdom) David Buxton	(United Kingdom) Bill Allen	Team Elite	Lotus Elite	26	Accident
DNF	95	GT2.0	(Belgium) Robert van der Borght	(Belgium) Hugo Schumacher	Robert van der Borght	MG A	24	Accident
DNF	92	GT2.0	(Switzerland) Georges Gachang	(Switzerland) Maurice Caillet	Ecurie Lausannoise	AC Ace	15	did not finish
DNF	4	S3.0	(Italy) Giorgio Scarlatti	(Italy) Giulio Cabianca	Scuderia Ferrari	Dino 246 S	14	Pit fire
DNF	112	GT1.3	(Belgium) André Liekens	(Belgium) Pascal Demol	Ecurie Azur	Lotus Elite	14	did not finish
DNF	3	S3.0	(United States) Richie Ginther	(Italy) Ludovico Scarfiotti	Scuderia Ferrari	Dino 246 S	13	Oil pressure
DNF	16	S3.0	(Italy) Gerino Garini	(Italy) Alfonso Thiele	Scuderia Serenissima	Ferrari 250 GT California LWB	7	Spin
DNF	7	S3.0	(United Kingdom) Graham Whitehead	(United Kingdom) Henry Taylor	A. Graham Whitehead	Aston Martin DBR1	7	Universal joint
DNF	8	S3.0	(United Kingdom) Jim Clark	(United Kingdom) Roy Salvadori	Border Reivers	Aston Martin DBR1/300	6	Valves
DNF	87	GT2.0	(West Germany) Hans Otto Kreft	(West Germany) Harald von Saucken	Hans Otto Kreft	Porsche 356 B	4	Accident
DNF	103	GT1.3	(Sweden) Erik Siegfasth	(Sweden) J. Berger	Scuderia Alfa Romeo Suecia	Alfa Romeo Giulietta	4	did not finish
DNF	110	GT1.3	(West Germany) Rudolf Wilhelm Moser	(West Germany) Heinz Friederichs	Rudolf Wilhelm Moser	Alfa Romeo Giulietta Veloce	4	Engine
DNF	107	GT1.3	(West Germany) Ewald Bandmann	(West Germany) Lothar Bender	Ewald Bandmann	Alfa Romeo Giulietta Veloce	4	did not finish
DNF	71	GT+2.0	(United States) Leon Lilley	(United States) Fred Gamble	Camoradi/USA Racing Team	Chevrolet Corvette C1		Front wheel bearing
DNF	26	S2.0	(Switzerland) André Wichy	(Switzerland) Robert Jenny	Equipe Lausannoise	Maserati 200S I		did not finish
DNF	94	GT2.0	(United States) Johnny Nova	(United States) Don Urian	Johnny Nova	Triumph TR3		Accident damage
DNF	91	GT2.0	(West Germany) Werner Lindermann	(East Germany) Arthur Rosenhammer	Werner Lindermann	Porsche 356 B		did not finish
DNF	108	GT1.3	(Portugal) Antionio Gentil de Herédia	(Portugal) Antonio Gandia	Antionio Gentil de Herédia	Alfa Romeo Giulietta		did not finish
DNF	120	GT1.3	(France) Jean-François Malle	(United Kingdom) Robin Carnegie	Jean-François Malle	Lotus Elite		did not finish
DNF	123	GT1.3	(United Kingdom) John Campbell-Jones	(United Kingdom) John Horridge	John Campbell-Jones	Lotus Elite		did not finish
DNF	90	GT2.0	(West Germany) Bruno Runte (West Germany) Paul Denk	(United States) Warren B. King	Bruno Runte	Porsche 356 B		did not finish
DNF	37	S1.6	(United Kingdom) J. Pat Fergusson	(United Kingdom) P. R. Baird	Elva Cars Ltd.	Elva Courier		did not finish
DNS	12	S3.0	(Belgium) ”Eldé”	(Belgium) Pierre Noblet	Ecurie Francorchamps	Ferrari 250 TR		
DNS	73	GT+2.0	(Argentina) Karl Stangl	(West Germany) Bernd Degner	Karl Stangl	Ferrari 250 GT		Accident
DISQ	75	GT+2.0	(United Kingdom) Jonathan Sieff	(United Kingdom) Douglas Graham	Taylor and Crawley Racing Team	Aston Martin DB4 GT		Non-homologated
DNS	78	GT+2.0	(Italy) Carlo Peroglio	(Italy) Piero Frescobaldi	Scuderia Serenissima	Ferrari 250 GT California LWB		Accident
DNS	118	GT1.3	(Belgium) Paul Deetens	(Belgium) Carl Smet	Paul Deetens	Lotus Elite		Accident
DNS	22T	S2.0	(West Germany) Hans Herrmann	(East Germany) Edger Barth	Dr. Ing. h. c. F. Porsche KG.	Porsche 718 RS 60		T-car

- Fastest Lap: Stirling Moss, 9:37.0secs (88.431 mph)

=== Class Winners ===
Class	Winners		
Sports 3000	5	Maserati Tipo 61	Moss / Gurney
Sports 2000	21	Porsche 718 RS 60	Bonnier / Gendebien
Sports 1600	36	Porsche 718 RSK	Walter / Losinger
Sports 1150	53	Lola-Climax Mk.1	Vögele / Ashdown
Sports 850	62	D.B-Panhard HBR5	Bartholoni / Vinatier
Grand Touring +2000	77	Ferrari 250 GT LWB	Abate / Davis
Grand Touring 2000	83	Porsche 356 B Carrera GTL Abarth	Strähle / Walter
Grand Touring 1300	117	Lotus Elite	Stacey / Wagstaff

== Standings after the race ==
=== FIA World Sportscar Championship ===
Pos	Championship	Points
1	(West Germany) Porsche	22 (26)
2	(Italy) Ferrari	18 (22)
3	(Italy) Maserati	11

- Note: Only the top five positions are included in this set of standings.
  Championship points were awarded for the first six places in each race in the order of 8-6-4-3-2-1. Manufacturers were only awarded points for their highest finishing car with no points awarded for positions filled by additional cars. Only the best 3 results out of the 5 races could be retained by each manufacturer. Points earned but not counted towards the championship totals are listed within brackets in the above table.

World Sportscar Championship
Previous race: Targa Florio	1960 season	Next race: 24 Hours of Le Mans

FIA GT Cup
Previous race: 12 Hours of Sebring	1960 season	Next race: 6 Hours of Hockenheim
