= 1960 1000 km Buenos Aires =

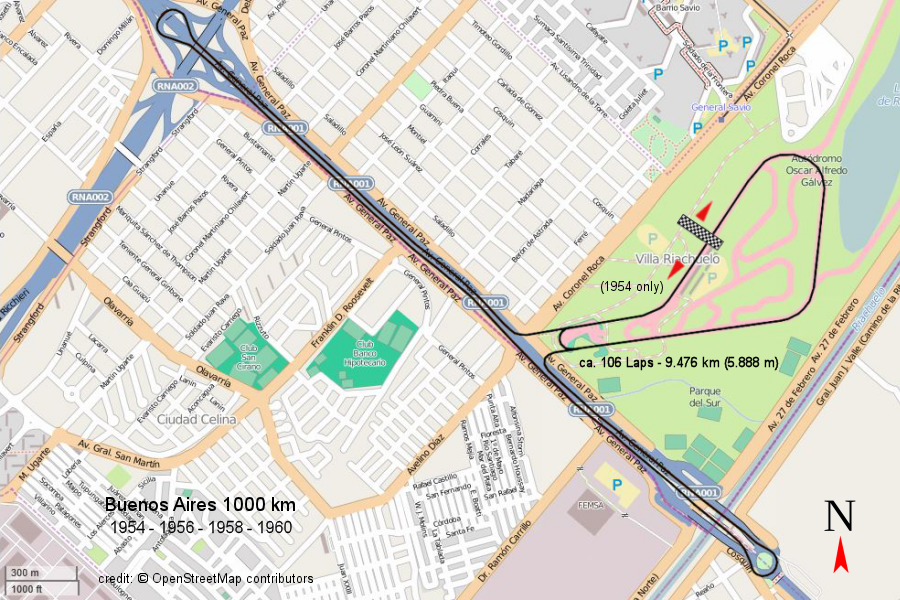
Autódromo Municipal-Avenida Paz - Buenos Aires 1000km

The 1960 1000 km Buenos Aires took place on 31 January, on the Autódromo Municipal-Avenida Paz, (Buenos Aires, Argentina). It was the sixth running of the race, and after a year off, it returned to be the opening round of the F.I.A. World Sports Car Championship. However, this was to be last time to race was held until a non-championship race was held in 1970

== Report ==
=== Entry ===
A grand total of 28 racing cars were registered for this event, of which all 28 arrived for practice and 27 for qualifying for the race. As with previous races in Argentina, the race was poorly supported by the work of teams. Only Scuderia Ferrari and Porsche KG sent works cars from Europe. The Italian marque had entered three of the stunning Ferrari 250 TR 59/60 for Richie Ginther/Wolfgang von Trips, Phil Hill/Cliff Allison and Ludovico Scarfiotti/José Froilán González. As for Porsche, they also entered three cars, their 718 RSK were piloted by Jo Bonnier/Graham Hill, Olivier Gendebien/Edgar Barth and Maurice Trintignant/Hans Herrmann

=== Qualifying ===
After a three-hour qualifying session held on the three days prior to the race, it was Phil Hill who took pole position for Scuderia Ferrari in their 250 TR.

=== Race ===
The race was held over 106 laps of the 5.888 mile, Autódromo Municipal-Avenida Paz, giving a distance of 624.162 miles (1,004.49 km). Due to the lack of opposition as the Porsches were racing in a different class, it was left to Ferrari to battle amongst themselves. The race was overshadowed by the fatal accident involving the American, Harry Blanchard, whose Porsche 718 RSK had crashed on the first lap, overturned and hit several times by other cars.

In the race, the Scuderia Ferrari of Hill and Allison, won ahead of their team-mates Ginther/von Trips. Car number 4, took an impressive victory, winning in a time of 6hrs 17:12.1 mins, averaging a speed of 99.283 mph. Second place went to the second Ferrari, albeit a lap adrift. The podium was complete by the S1.6 class winner, Bonnier/Hill who in return were a further four laps behind.

== Official Classification ==
Class Winners are in Bold text.

Pos	No	Class	Driver		Entrant	Chassis	Laps	Reason Out
1st	**4**	**S3.0**	(United States) **Phil Hill**	(United Kingdom) **Cliff Allison**	**Scuderia Ferrari**	**Ferrari 250 TR 59/60**	**6hr 17:12.1, 106**	
2nd	2	S3.0	(United States) Richie Ginther	(West Germany) Wolfgang von Trips	Scuderia Ferrari	Ferrari 250 TR 59/60	105	
3rd	**30**	**S1.6**	(Sweden) **Jo Bonnier**	(United Kingdom) **Graham Hill**	**Porsche KG**	**Porsche 718 RSK**	**101**	
4th	14	S3.0	(Brazil) Celso Lara Barberis	(Brazil) Christian Heins		Maserati 300S	101	
5th	42	S1.6	(Argentina) Pedro von Döry (Argentina) Juan Manuel Bordeu	(Argentina) Anton von Döry		Porsche 718 RSK	100	
6th	36	S1.6	(Belgium) Christian Goethals	(West Germany) Curt Delfosse		Porsche 718 RSK	100	
7th	34	S1.6	(France) Maurice Trintignant	(West Germany) Hans Herrmann	Porsche KG	Porsche 718 RSK	95	
8th	44	S1.6	(Argentina) Hugo Maestretti	(Argentina) Alberto Gómez		Porsche 718 RSK	94	
9th	**50**	**GT**	(Italy) **“Madero”**	(Italy) **Nino Todaro**		**Ferrari 250 GT LWB Interim**	**92**	
10th	56	GT	(West Germany) Huschke von Hanstein	(Argentina) Heriberto Bohnen	Porsche KG	Porsche 356B Carrera	88	
DNF	8	S3.0	(Argentina) Roberto Bonomi	(Argentina) Luis Milán		Maserati 300S	83	Clutch
11th	52	GT	(Venezuela) Ugo Tosa	(Venezuela) Silvano Turco		Ferrari 250 GT LWB	83	
DNF	20	S3.0	(United States) Dan Gurney	(United States) Masten Gregory	Camoradi International	Maserati Tipo 61	56	Gearbox/Suspension
DNF	32	S1.6	(Belgium) Olivier Gendebien	(East Germany) Edgar Barth	Porsche KG	Porsche 718 RSK	53	Oil pipe
DNF	6	S3.0	(Italy) Ludovico Scarfiotti	(Argentina) José Froilán González	Scuderia Ferrari	Dino 246 S	38	Distributor
DNF	10	S3.0	(Argentina) Rodolfo de Álzaga	(Argentina) Nestor Salerno		Maserati 300S	10	Engine
DNF	24	S3.0	(Italy) Antonio Pucci	(Italy) Ernesto Dagnino		Maserati	5	Oil pressure
DNF	18	S3.0	(Argentina) Camilo Gay	(Argentina) César Rivero		Lancia D24	4	Transmission
DNF	54	GT	(Italy) Carlo Maria Abate	(Argentina) Alberto Rodríguez Larreta		Ferrari 250 GT LWB	2	Brakes
DNF	16	S3.0	(Brazil) Fernando Barreto	(Argentina) Carlos Najurieta		Maserati 300S	0	Transmission
DNF	22	S2.0	(Argentina) Enrique Sticoni	(Argentina) Jesús Iglesias		Maserati 200S I	0	Gearbox
DNF	38	S1.6	(Switzerland) Heini Walter	(Argentina) Juan Manuel Bordeu		Porsche 718 RSK	0	Accident
DNF	40	S1.6	(United States) Harry Blanchard	(West Germany) Wolfgang Seidel	Wolfgang Seidel	Porsche 718 RSK	0	Fatal accident (Blanchard)
DNS	26	S3.0	(Venezuela) Ettore Chimeri	(Venezuela) Julio Pola		Maserati 300S		did not start
DNS	12	S3.0	(Argentina) Carlos Guimarey	(Spain) António Creus		Maserati 300S		did not start
DNS	28	S3.0	(Argentina) Cesar Reyes	(Argentina) Julio Guimarey		Ferrari 750 Monza		did not start
DNS	48	GT	(Italy) Carlo Mario Abate	(Italy) Casimiro Toselli	Scuderia Serenissima	Ferrari 250 GT LWB		Differential
DNQ	46	S1.6	(Italy) Gino Munaron (Italy) Alberto Mapelli Mozzi	(Argentina) Carlos Reyes		Osca S1500		

- Fastest Lap: Dan Gurney, 3:22.4secs (104.733 mph)

=== Class Winners ===
Class	Winners		
Sports 3000	4	Ferrari 250 TR 59/60 Fantuzzi Spyder	Hill / Allison
Sports 1600	30	Porsche 718 RSK	Bonnier / Hill
Grand Touring	50	Ferrari 250 GT Interim	“Madero” / Todaro

== Standings after the race ==
Pos	Championship	Points
1	(Italy) Ferrari	8
2	(West Germany) Porsche	4
3	(Italy) Maserati	3

- Note: Only the top five positions are included in this set of standings.

Championship points were awarded for the first six places in each race in the order of 8-6-4-3-2-1. Manufacturers were only awarded points for their highest finishing car with no points awarded for positions filled by additional cars. Only the best 3 results out of the 5 races could be retained by each manufacturer. Points earned but not counted towards the championship totals are listed within brackets in the above table.

World Sportscar Championship
Previous race: RAC Tourist Trophy	1960 season	Next race: 12 Hours of Sebring
