= 1960 Targa Florio =

The 44° Targa Florio took place on 8 May 1960, on the Circuito Piccolo delle Madonie, (Sicily, Italy). It was the third round of the F.I.A. World Sports Car Championship.

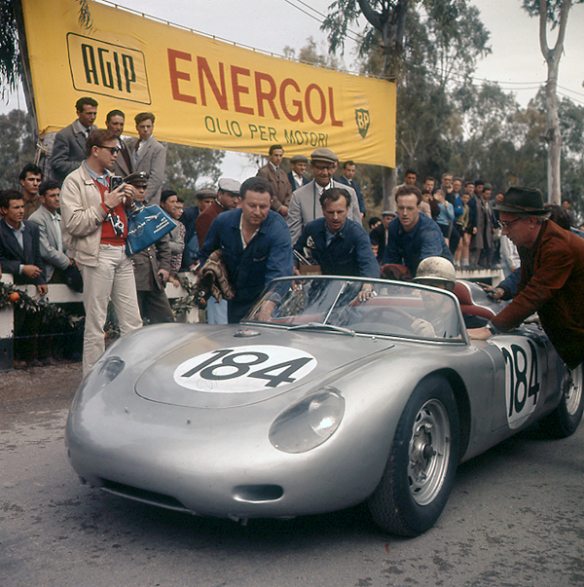
Winning Porsche 718 RS 60 driven by Jo Bonnier and Hans Herrmann.

== Report ==
=== Entry ===
The event attracted more cars than in previous seasons, with 78 racing cars were registered for this event, instead of the 58 in 1959, of which 77 arrived for practice. Only these, 69 qualified for, and started the race.

Reigning World Champions, Ferrari had entered three of their latest 250 TR 60 and Dino 246 S for their squad of drivers; Phil Hill, Wolfgang von Trips, Richie Ginther, Willy Mairesse, Ludovico Scarfiotti and Cliff Allison. As Aston Martin elected to miss the championship in concentrate on Formula One, there was no other factory entrants in the S3.0 class, therefore their main opposition would come from the works Porsches of Jo Bonnier, Hans Herrmann, Edgar Barth, Graham Hill and Olivier Gendebien, despite these were smaller engined cars and less powerful, the marque was victorious twelve months earlier and in the last round, 12 Hours of Sebring.

=== Race ===
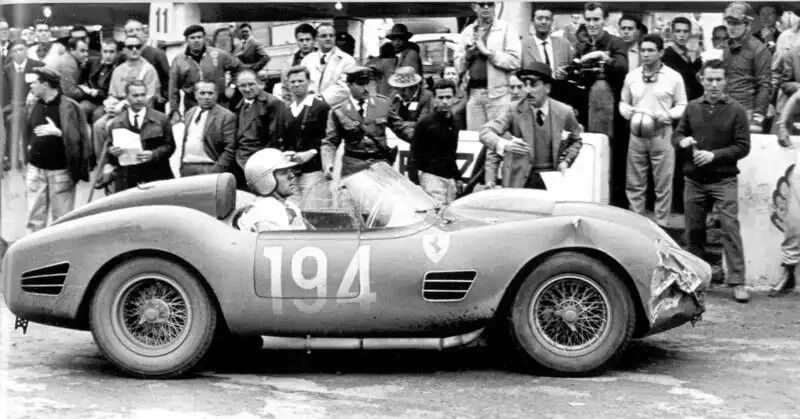
1959 Dino 246 S, s/n 0784, driven to a second place overall by Phil Hill and Wolfgang von Trips.

Even before the race started, Ferrari had a frightening accident where Allisons’s 250 TR suffered a blown tyre, and was withdrawn from the event.

At the start, the remaining three Scuderia Ferrari’s in the Sport category were the favourites. The cars of the Rodríguez brothers and that of Hill and von Trips, who were supposed to attack. Once von Trips has moved into the lead, it was decided they should continue to race flat-out, and not back off, to try and maintenance their advantage. In the fight for the victory, the Porsche of Bonnier/Herrmann moved ahead of the Ferraris, however it was the all Italian crew of Umberto Maglioli and Nino Vaccarella in their Maserati Tipo 61 who were on a charge. On lap five, Maglioli passed Hermann, only to ceded the leadership to Palermo-born Vaccarella who betrayed his audience: everyone looked at him with his breath a bit 'suspended, it did not seem possible; Nino completed the sixth lap slightly increasing the advantage of Hermann; the seventh his Maserati, the number 200, it did make the fastest lap and was passing with a lead over three minutes. On the seventh lap, Maglioli waiting for him to finish the race brilliantly, but did not reach Vaccarella: a stone had punctured the fuel tank.

The Porsche of Bonnier/Herrmann inherited the lead, to record their second straight win in Sicily, and their second consecutive win in the World Sportscar Champions. They took the victory, with their 718 RS 60 completing 10 laps, covering 447.388 miles in just over 7½ hours of racing, averaging a speed of 59.239 mph. Second place went to the works Ferrari of von Trips and Hill in a Dino 246 S, albeit over 6 mins adrift. The podium was complete by another works Porsche, of Olivier Gendebien and Herrmann who were further 2½ mins behind.

== Official Classification ==
Class Winners are in Bold text.

Pos	No	Class	Driver		Entrant	Chassis	Laps	Reason Out
1st	**184**	**S2.0**	(Sweden) **Jo Bonnier**	(West Germany) **Hans Herrmann**	**Porsche KG**	**Porsche 718 RS 60**	**7hr 33:08.2, 10**	
2nd	**194**	**S3.0**	(West Germany) **Wolfgang von Trips**	(United States) **Phil Hill**	**Scuderia Ferrari**	**Dino 246 S**	**7hr 39:11.0, 10**	
3rd	176	S2.0	(Belgium) Olivier Gendebien	(West Germany) Hans Herrmann	Porsche KG	Porsche 718 RS 60	7hr 41:46.0, 10	
4th	198	S3.0	(Belgium) Willy Mairesse (Italy) Giulio Cabianca	(Italy) Ludovico Scarfiotti	Scuderia Ferrari	Dino 246 S	7hr 44.49.0, 10	
5th	**160**	**S1.6**	(East Germany) **Edgar Barth**	(United Kingdom) **Graham Hill**	**Porsche KG**	**Porsche 718 RS 60**	**7hr 59:11.6, 10**	
6th	**116**	**GT2.5**	(West Germany) **Paul-Ernst Strähle** (West Germany) **Herbert Linge**	(West Germany) **Dieter Lissmann**	**Paul-Ernst Strähle**	**Porsche 356 B Carrera GTL Abarth**	**8hr 10:06.2, 10**	
7th	172	S2.0	(Mexico) Ricardo Rodríguez	(Mexico) Pedro Rodríguez	North American Racing Team	Dino 196 S	8hr 16:52.0, 10	
8th	120	GT2.5	(West Germany) Herbert Linge (West Germany) Paul-Ernst Strähle	(West Germany) Dieter Lissmann	Paul-Ernst Strähle	Porsche 356B Carrera	8hr 19:54.2, 10	
9th	208	S3.0	(Italy) Elio Lenza	(Italy) Antonio Maglione	Partenopea	Ferrari 250 GT SWB	8hr 23:27.4, 10	
10th	**134**	**GT+2.5**	(Italy) **Edoardo Lualdi**	(Italy) **Giorgio Scarlatti**	**Scuderia Sant’Ambroeus**	**Ferrari 250 GT LWB**	**8hr 26:38.0, 10**	
11th	**74**	**S1.15**	(Italy) **Ada Pace**	(Italy) **Giancarlo Castellina**	**Nineteen Racing Club**	**Osca S1100**	**8hr 27:27.0, 10**	
12th	204	S3.0	(Italy) Gerino Gerini	(Italy) Salvatore La Pira	Scuderia Serenissima	Ferrari 250 GT SWB	8hr 31:27.3, 10	
13th	**50**	**GT1.3**	(Italy) **Vincenzo Riolo**	(Italy) **Alessandro Federico**	**Monte Pellegrino**	**Alfa Romeo Giulietta Sprint Speciale**	**8hr 37:33.4. 10**	
14th	42	GT1.3	(Italy) Baldassare Taormina	(Italy) Saica	Baldassare Taormina	Alfa Romeo Giulietta Sprint Veloce Zagato	8hr 43:31.2, 10	
15th	156	S1.6	(Italy) Gianni Brichetti	(Italy) Corrado Manfredini	Madunina	Osca S1500	8hr 45:54.0, 10	
16th	**14**	**GT1.15**	(France) **Gérard Laureau**	(France) **Bernard Cahier**	**Gérard Laureau**	**D.B. HBR Panhard Coupé**	**8hr 51:32.0, 10**	
17th	152	S1.6	(Italy) Francisco Siracusa	(Italy) Anna Maria Peduzzi	Aspromonte	Osca F2/S 1500	8hr 52:23.0, 10	
18th	206	S3.0	(Italy) Pietro Ferraro	(Italy) Armando Zampiero	San Marco	Ferrari 250 GT SWB	8hr 54:.07, 10	
19th	60	GT1.3	(Italy) Massimo Leto di Priolo	(Italy) Ottavio Prandoni	Scuderia Ambrosiana	Alfa Romeo Giulietta Sprint Zagato	8hr 54:11.0, 10	
20th	48	GT1.3	(Italy) Vito Coco	(Italy) Vito Sabbia	Scuderia Etna	Alfa Romeo Giulietta Sprint Veloce	8hr 54:41.0, 10	
21st	118	GT2.5	(Italy) Luigi Mosca	(Italy) Giuseppe Cucchiarelli	Montegrappa	Fiat 8V Zagato	10	
22nd	92	GT2.5	(United States) Lloyd Casner	(Italy) Nino Todaro	Camoradi USA	Porsche 356B 1600	10	
23rd	36	GT1.3	(Italy) Pietro Laureati	(Italy) Giorgio Scarlatti	Scuderia Sant’Ambroeus	Alfa Romeo Giulietta Sprint Veloce Zagato	10	
24th	84	S1.15	(Italy) Attilio Brandi	(Italy) Ilfo Minzoni	Scuderia Settecolli	Osca S1100 S273	10	
25th	34	GT1.3	(Italy) Emanuele	(Italy) Aldebaran	La Clessidra	Alfa Romeo Giulietta Sprint Veloce	10	
26th	56	GT1.3	(Italy) Giulio Pernice	(Italy) Salvatore Russo	Scuderia Etna	Alfa Romeo Giulietta Spider	10	
27th	180	S2.0	(Italy) Franco Pisano	(Italy) Salvatore Sirchia	Monte Pellegrino	Maserati 200S I	10	
28th	54	GT1.3	(Italy) Silvio Mandato	(Italy) Giuseppe Ruggero	Partenopea	Alfa Romeo Giulietta Sprint Veloce	10	
NC	108	GT2.5	(Italy) Sergio Mantia	(Italy) Giuseppe D’Amico	Monte Pellegrino	Alfa Romeo 2500	10	over time limit
NC	106	GT2.5	(Italy) Aldo Mancini	(Italy) Rosario Buondonno	Aldo Mancini	Alfa Romeo 2500	10	over time limit
NC	114	GT2.5	(Italy) Ovidio Capelli	(Italy) Ottavio Prandoni	Ovidio Capelli	Fiat 1500 Cabriolet	10	over time limit
NC	32	GT1.3	(Italy) Fernando Natella	(Italy) Raffaele Fiordelisi	Scuderia Settecolli	Alfa Romeo Giulietta Sprint Veloce Zagato	10	over time limit
NC	16	GT1.15	(Italy) Casare Largaioli	(Italy) Teboro Zeccoli	Scuderia Castellotti	Lancia Appia GTZ	10	over time limit
NC	40	GT2.5	(Italy) Marco Vannucci	(Italy) Gian Carlo Carfi	Scuderia Etna	Lancia Aurelia B20	10	over time limit
NC	**24**	**S850**	(Italy) **Francesco Soldano**	(Italy) **Giuseppe Ramirez**	**Monte Pellegrino**	**Fiat-Abarth 750 Sport**	**10**	**over time limit**
NC	26	S850	(Italy) Guido Garufi	(Italy) Franco Tagliavia	Guido Garufi	Fiat-Abarth 850 Zagato	10	over time limit
NC	12	GT1.15	(Italy) Francesco Fiorentino	(Italy) Gregorio Rizzotti	San Rizzo	Lancia Appia GTZ	10	over time limit
DNF	96	GT2.5	(Italy) Antonio Diomaiuta	(Italy) Giancarlo Presciutti	Montegrappa	Fiat 8V Zagato	8	did not finish
DNF	104	GT2.5	(Italy) Francesco di Benedetto	(Italy) Franceso Mentesana	Balarm	Alfa Romeo 1900 Super Sprint Zagato	8	did not finish
DNF	44	GT1.3	(Italy) Kim	(Italy) Alfonso Thiele	Scuderia Sant’Ambroeus	Alfa Romeo Giulietta Sprint Zagato	7	did not finish
DNF	82	S1.15	(Italy) Domenico Rotolo	(Italy) Gaspere Cavaliere	Monte Pellegrino	Osca MT4 1100	7	did not finish
DNF	112	GT2.5	(Italy) Guido Perrella	(Italy) Antonio Covino	Guido Perrella	Alfa Romeo 1900 Super Sprint Touring	7	did not finish
DNF	200	S3.0	(Italy) Umberto Maglioli	(Italy) Nino Vaccarella	Camoradi USA	Maserati Tipo 61	7	Fuel tank
DNF	62	GT1.3	(Italy) Emanuele Trapani	(Italy) Guercia	Balarm	Alfa Romeo Giulietta Sprint Speciale	6	did not finish
DNF	102	GT2.5	(Italy) Renato Monaci	(Italy) Forlanini	Partenopea	Lancia Aurelia B20	6	did not finish
DNF	110	GT2.5	(West Germany) Huschke von Hanstein	(Italy) Antonio Pucci	Porsche KG	Porsche 356B Carrera Reutter	6	Accident, Fuel starvation
DNF	188	S2.0	(United Kingdom) Colin Davis	(Italy) Raffaele Cammarota	Scuderia Serenissima	Cooper-Maserati T49 Monaco	6	Broken header tank
DNF	192	S3.0	(Italy) Domenico Tramontana	(Italy) Giuseppe Alotta	Partenopea	Ferrari 250 GT SWB	6	did not finish
DNF	46	GT1.3	(Italy) Antonio Picone	(Italy) Antonio di Salvo	Monte Pellegrino	Alfa Romeo Giulietta Sprint Speciale	5	did not finish
DNF	154	S1.6	(Italy) Giovani Giordano	(Italy) Gaetano Starrabba	Scuderia Serenissima	Osca MT4	5	did not finish
DNF	202	S3.0	(United Kingdom) Cliff Allison	(United States) Richie Ginther	Scuderia Ferrari	Ferrari 250 TR 59/60	5	Accident
DNF	38	GT1.3	(Italy) Dario Sepe	(Italy) Sergio Bettoja	Partenopea	Alfa Romeo Giulietta Sprint Zagato	4	did not finish
DNF	76	S1.15	(Italy) Mario Raimondo	(Italy) Salvatore Calascibetta	Balarm	Osca MT4 1100	4	did not finish
DNF	4	GT850	(Argentina) Roberto Bonomi	(Italy) Cavalieri	Monte Pellegrino	Fiat-Abarth 750 Zagato	3	did not finish
DNF	22	S750	(Italy) Gaetano Spampinato	(Italy) Giuseppe Matera	Scuderia Etna	Fiat-Abarth 750 Sport Spampinato	3	did not finish
DNF	94	GT2.5	(Italy) Bartolomeo Donato	(Italy) Giuseppe Pizzo	Balarm	Lancia Aurelia B20	3	did not finish
DNF	64	GT1.3	(Italy) Sergio Bettoja	(Italy) Sagittario	Scuderia Sant’Ambroeus	Alfa Romeo Giulietta Sprint Speciale	2	did not finish
DNF	72	S1.15	(Italy) Francesco de Leonibus	(Italy) Gina Munaron	Virgilio Conrero	Conrero-Alfa Romeo 1150 Sport	2	did not finish
DNF	80	S1.15	(Italy) Umberto Bini	(West Germany) Hans Bauer	Scuderia Sant' Ambroeus	Osca S 1100 (S 273)	2	did not finish
DNF	124	GT2.5	(Italy) Rosario Montalbano	(Italy) Gaspere Bologna	Monte Pellegrino	Fiat 8V	2	did not finish
DNF	8	GT850	(Italy) Michele Paratore	(Italy) Benedetto Manasseri	Trinacria	Fiat-Abarth 750 Goccia Vignale	1	did not finish
DNF	40	GT1.3	(Italy) Giuseppe Grasso	(Italy) Vito Sabbia	Scuderia Etna	Alfa Romeo Giulietta Sprint	1	did not finish
DNF	58	GT1.3	(Italy) Paolo Samona	(Italy) Dracula	Partenopea	Alfa Romeo Giulietta Sprint Veloce Zagato	1	did not finish
DNF	78	S1.15	(Italy) Giovanni Napoli	(Italy) Angelo Marino	Monte Pellegrino	Ermini-Fiat 1100	1	did not finish
DNF	162	S1.6	(United States) George Bauer	(United States) Carroll Smith	Vincenzo Arena	Osca S1500	1	Accident
DNF	178	S2.0	(Italy) Odoardo Govoni	(Italy) Mennato Boffa	Luigi Bellucci	Maserati Tipo 60	1	Clutch
DNF	186	S2.0	(Italy) Mennato Boffa	(Italy) Adolfo Tedeschi	Luigi Bellucci	WRE-Maserati	1	did not finish
DNF	122	GT2.5	(Italy) Alfonso Vella	(Italy) Pietro Termini	Monte Pellegrino	Fiat 8V	0	did not finish
DNF	158	S1.6	(Italy) Raffaele Fiordelisi	(Italy) Bartolomeo Donato	Settecolli	Alfa Romeo Speciale 1500	0	did not finish
DNS	6	GT850	(Italy) Michele Perillo	(Italy) Angelo Ambrogio	Madunina	Fiat-Abarth 750		did not start
DNS	52	GT1.3	(Italy) Aldo Tine	(Italy) Matteo Sgarlata	Aretusa	Alfa Romeo Giulietta Sprint		did not start
DNS	100	GT2.5	(Italy) Manlio Santuccio	(Italy) Matteo Sgarlata	Aretusa	Fiat 8V		did not start
DNS	132	GT3.0	(Italy) Casimiro Toselli	(Italy) Nino Todaro	Scuderia Sant’Ambroeus	Ferrari 250 GT LWB		did not start
DNS	138	GT3.0	(Italy) Giuseppe Allotta	(Italy) Giorgio Scarlatti	Partenopea	Ferrai 250 GT California LWB		did not start
DNS	182	S2.0	(Italy) Luigi Bellucci	(Italy) Vincenzo Sorrentino	Luigi Bellucci	WRE-Maserati		did not start
DNS	196	S3.0	(United Kingdom) Cliff Allison	(United States) Phil Hill	Scuderia Ferrari	Ferrari 250 TR 59/60		Blown tyre, accident
DNS	T	S3.0	(Belgium) Paul Frère		Scuderia Ferrari	Ferrari 250 TR		practiced only

- Fastest Lap: Jo Bonnier, 42:46.0secs (62.767 mph)

=== Class Winners ===
Class	Winners		
Sports 3000	194	Dino 246 S	von Trips / P. Hill
Sports 2000	184	Porsche 718 RS 60	Bonnier / Herrmann
Sports 1600	160	Porsche 718 RS 60	Barth / G. Hill
Sports 1150	74	Osca S1100	Pace / Castellina
Sports 850	24	Fiat-Abarth 750 Sport	Soldano / Ramirez
Grand Touring +2500	134	Ferrari 250 GT LWB	Lualdi / Scarlatti
Grand Touring 2600	116	Porsche 356B Carrera Abarth GTL	Strähle / Lissmann / Linge
Grand Touring 1300	50	Alfa Romeo Giulietta Sprint Speciale	Riolo / Federico
Grand Touring 1150	14	D.B. HBR Panhard Coupé	Laureau / Cahier
Grand Touring 750	No classified finisher		

== Standings after the race ==
Pos	Championship	Points
1	(West Germany) Porsche	20
2	(Italy) Ferrari	18
3	(Italy) Maserati	3

- Note: Only the top five positions are included in this set of standings.

Championship points were awarded for the first six places in each race in the order of 8-6-4-3-2-1. Manufacturers were only awarded points for their highest finishing car with no points awarded for positions filled by additional cars. Only the best 3 results out of the 5 races could be retained by each manufacturer. Points earned but not counted towards the championship totals are listed within brackets in the above table.

World Sportscar Championship
Previous race: 12 Hours of Sebring	1960 season	Next race: 1000km Nürburgring
