= 1963 Targa Florio =

Automobile race

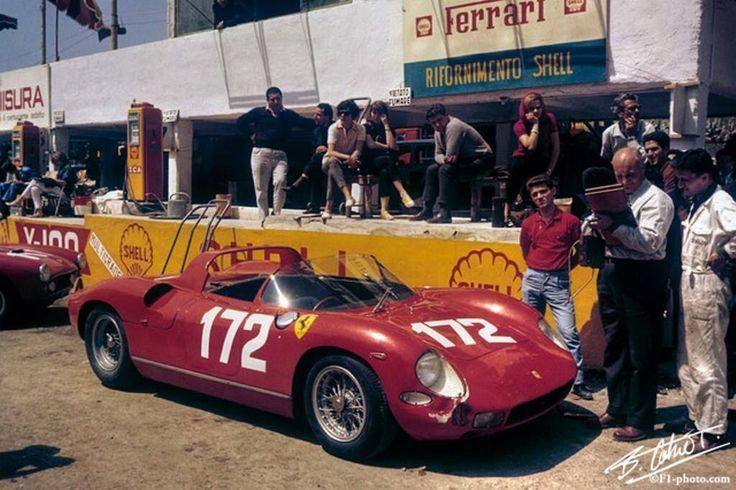
Despite an impressive start, the Ferrari 250 P No 172 of Mairesse/Scarfiotti had to retire for a crash after four laps

The 47° Targa Florio took place on 5 May 1963, on the Circuito Piccolo delle Madonie, Sicily (Italy). Porsche took the overall victory, marking the beginning of its dominance at the event which – apart from 1965 – will last until 1971.

== Race ==
After two consecutive victories in 1961 and 1962, Scuderia Ferrari deployed its new 250 P prototypes which previously earned a double victory at the Sebring event. However, the Scuderia was deprived of driver Nino Vaccarella because he was not in compliance with driving documents. After dominating the early laps of the race, the 250 P's driven by John Surtees and Willy Mairesse respectively, were both crashed. The Ferrari 196 SP driven by Lorenzo Bandini and Ludovico Scarfiotti then took the lead, pursued by the Porsche 718 GTR of Jo Bonnier and Carlo Maria Abate. Mairesse was again chosen for driving the leading 196 SP for the last shift, but a driving error cost him first place, won by the Porsche 718 by just 11 seconds.

== Official results ==
Pos	Class	No	Team	Drivers	Chassis	Laps
1	P 2.0	160	(Germany) Porsche KG	(Sweden) Jo Bonnier (Italy) Carlo Maria Abate	Porsche 718 GTR	10
2	S 2.0	190	(Italy) Ferrari SEFAC	(Italy) Lorenzo Bandini (Italy) Ludovico Scarfiotti (Belgium) Willy Mairesse	Ferrari 196 SP	10
3	GT; 2.0	80	(Germany) Porsche KG	(Germany) Edgar Barth (Germany) Herbert Linge	Porsche 356 B Carrera GS	10

World Sportscar Championship
Previous race: 1963 12 Hours of Sebring	1963 season	Next race: 1963 500 km of Spa
