= 1960 12 Hours of Sebring =

Sports car endurance race

Sebring International Raceway in 1952-1966

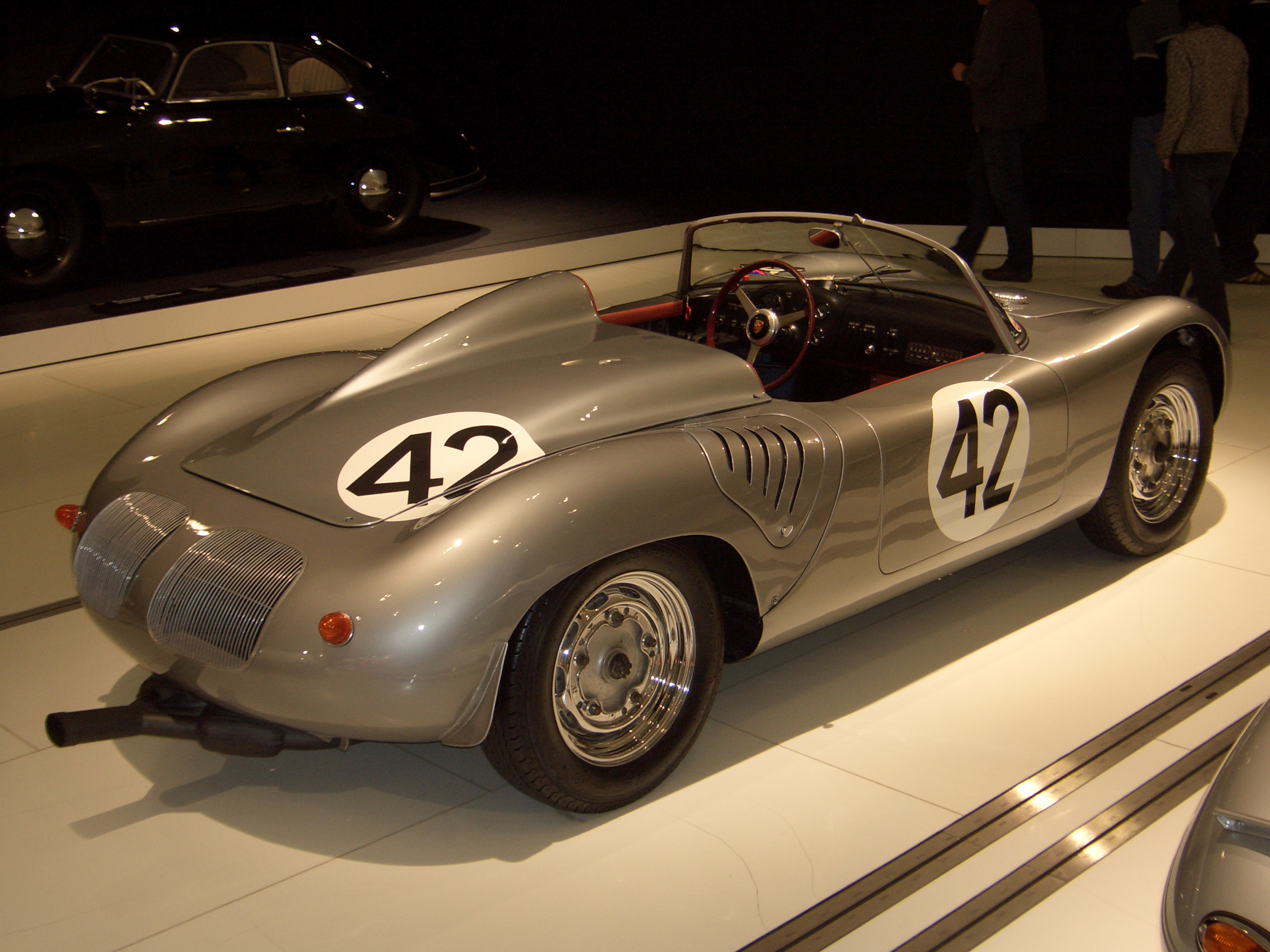
Porsche 718 RS 60 Spyder

The Tenth Annual Sebring International Grand Prix of Endurance for the Amoco Trophy took place on 26 March 1960, on the Sebring International Raceway, (Florida, United States). It was the second round of the F.I.A. World Sports Car Championship. This was also the second round of the F.I.A. GT Cup.

== Report ==
=== Entry ===
A massive total of 89 racing cars were registered for this event, of which 72 arrived for practice. Only these, 65 qualified for, and started the race. There was controversy surrounding the entry. The event promoter, Alec Ulmann had signed a deal with Amoco whereby they would be the fuel suppliers for the race. This prohibited any entrant from using any other brand of fuel.

This resulted in the works Ferrari and Porsche teams boycotting the event, as they had their own exclusive fuel arrangements with Shell Oil and British Petroleum (BP) respectively. However, these teams would still be represented in Florida. For Ferrari, their sent cars to Luigi Chinetti, who entered the cars under the North American Racing Team (NART) banner and thereby as a private entry and not bound by any agreement between Scuderia Ferrari and Shell. As for Porsche, they ‘leased’ two of their new RS 60 Spyders to the works driver, Jo Bonnier. Together with a number of Porsche drivers and mechanics who just happened to be holidaying in Florida at that time, volunteered they services to Bonnier for the event.

There was also controversy when the F.I.A. made last minute rules changes concerning the luggage compartments and windscreens on the Grand Touring (GT) cars. The FIA ruled that these cars should be racing closer the factory specifications than some actually where. This caused some problems for the smaller cars like the Oscas.

=== Qualifying ===
As was the normal for Sebring and because there was no qualifying sessions to set the grid, the starting positions were decided according to engine size with the 5.0 litre Chevrolet Corvette C1 of Briggs Cunningham and John Fitch being given first place.

=== Race ===
Most of the 50,000 spectators expected Stirling Moss to win the race in his ”Birdcage” Maserati Tipo 61, provided the car lasted the distance. Of the 65 cars that qualified, many looked strange due to the hasty modifications placed on them with the new F.I.A. regulations.

Moss had a bad start due to his Maserati having problems starting and pulled away in 23rd place, but by the second lap, the Englishman was up the second behind the early leader, the Ferrari of Pete Lovely. He would pass Lovely on the next lap.

On lap five, a tragic accident occurred at the hairpin. The Lotus Elite being driven by Jim Hughes suffered a brake failure and headed for the escape road, only to found a photographer standing here, complete with tripod. Hughes tried to avoid him, but rolled his little Lotus, striking the photographer and killing them both.

At the end of the first hour, Moss, partnered by Dan Gurney were leading from another Birdcage T61 of Walt Hansgen and Ed Crawford. The first of the NART Ferraris was in third, driven by Richie Ginther and Chuck Daigh. By the start of the ‘lunch’ hour, the Ferrari had moved into second.

On lap 84, the Porsche of Graham Hill parked up with a rod through the engine block, while around the same time, the Ginther/Daigh Ferrari pitted with steam pouring from under the bonnet. Shortly after, the T61 of Crawford ran wide at the hairpin and got struck in the sandbank. Crawford proceeded to dig his car free using his hands, taking almost two hours to do so. Despite their problems, the Ginther/Daigh Ferarri was still in second at the halfway point, albeit lapping 3 mph slower than Moss/Gurney. Now in third was the little Porsche of Hans Herrmann and Olivier Gendebien.

After completing 123 laps, the Ginther/Daigh Ferrari was withdrawn as it was leaking water and oil. Just 13 laps later, and the leaders were also out, retiring with transmission failure. With 3½ hours to run, the Herrmann/Gendebien Porsche found itself firmly in the lead with another Porsche in second, being piloted by Bob Holbert and Roy Schechter.

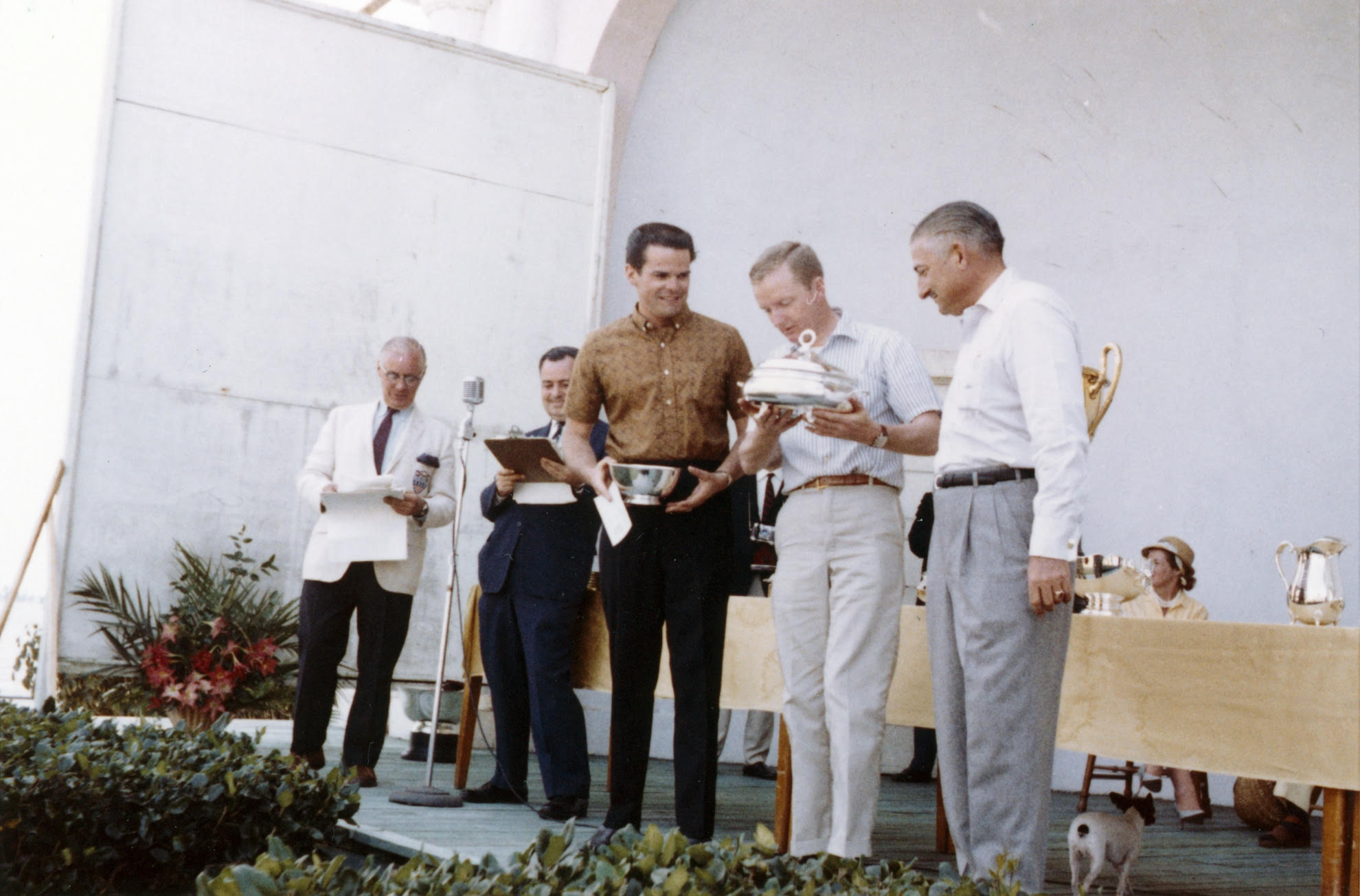
Trophy presentation with Jack Nethercutt II, Pete Lovely, and J.B. Nethercutt

After 12 hours of racing, the Bonnier entered Porsche of Herrmann and Gendebien, won ahead of the similar Brumos Porsche of Holbert and Schechter. Car number 42, took an impressive victory, completing 196 laps, covering 1,019.2 miles after 12 hours of racing, averaging a speed of 84.927 mph. Second place went to the second Porsche, albeit nine lap adrift. The podium was complete by the Ferrari of Lovely and Jack Nethercutt who were a further lap behind.

== Official Classification ==
Class Winners are in Bold text.

Pos	No	Class	Driver		Entrant	Chassis	Laps	Reason Out
1st	**42**	**S1.6**	(West Germany) **Hans Herrmann**	(Belgium) **Olivier Gendebien**	**Joakim Bonnier**	**Porsche 718 RS60**	**12hr 00:03.030, 196**	
2nd	44	S1.6	(United States) Bob Holbert	(United States) Roy Schechter	Brumos Porsche Car Corp.	Porsche 718 RS60	187	
3rd	**8**	**S3.0**	(United States) **Pete Lovely**	**(United States) Jack Nethercutt**	**Jack Nethercutt**	**Ferrari 250 TR 59/60**	**186**	
4th	10	S3.0	(United States) Ed Hugus	(United States) Augie Pabst	North American Racing Team	Ferrari 250 GT SWB	185	
5th	17	S3.0	(United States) George Reed	(United States) Alan Connell, Jnr.	RRR Motors	Ferrari 250 GT California	185	
6th	12	S3.0	(United States) Bill Sturgis	(Brazil) Fritz D'Orey	William Sturgis	Ferrari 250 GT SWB	183	
7th	11	S3.0	(United States) George Arents	(United States) William Kimberly	North American Racing Team	Ferrari 250 GT SWB	183	
8th	**16**	**GT3.0**	(Italy) **Carlo Maria Abate** (Italy) **Fabrizio Serena**	(Italy) **Giorgio Scarlatti**	**Scuderia Serenissima**	**Ferrari 250 GT California LWB**	**179**	
9th	**72**	**GT1.6**	(United States) **Dick Dungan**	(United States) **Joe Sheppard**	**Camoradi USA**	**Porsche 356A Carrera**	**177**	
10th	14	S3.0	(United States) Robert Publicker (United States) Dean McCarthy	(United States) George Constantine	Robert Publicker	Ferrari 250 GT California LWB	174	
11th	80	GT1.6	(Netherlands) Jan Bootz	(Netherlands) Carel Godin de Beaufort	Count Karel de Beaufort	Porsche 356A Carrera	172	
12th	**63**	**S850**	(United States) **John Bentley**	(United States) **John Gordon**	**Automobili Osca USA**	**Osca S750**	**170**	
DNF	24	S3.0	(United States) Luke Stear	(United States) Dave Causey	Dave Casuey	Maserati Tipo 61	169	Gearbox
13th	47	S1.6	(United States) George Koehne	(United States) Rees Makins	Automobili Osca USA	Osca MT4 1500	169	
14th	**31**	**GT2.0**	(United States) **Max Goldman**	(United States) **Ralph Burbin**	**S.H. Arnolt Inc.**	**Arnolt Bolide**	**169**	
15th	20	GT3.0	(United States) Gilbert Geitner	(United States) Lew Spencer	British Motor Corp.	Austin-Healey 3000	167	
16th	**6**	**GT5.0**	(United States) **Bill Fritts**	(United States) **Chuck Hall**	**RRR Motors**	**Chevrolet Corvette C1**	**167**	
17th	**58**	**S1.15**	(Switzerland) **Charles Vögele**	(United Kingdom) **Peter Ashdown**	**Charles Vögele**	**Lola-Climax Mk.1**	**167**	
18th	**54**	**GT1.3**	(Mexico) **Fred van Beuren** (Mexico) **Adolfo Velásquez**	(Mexico) **Javier Velásquez**	**Frederico van Beuren**	**Alfa Romeo Giuletta Veloce**	**166**	
19th	50	GT1.3	(United States) Tom O'Brien	(United States) Don Horn	Louis Comito	Alfa Romeo Giuletta Veloce	166	
20th	36	GT2.0	(United States) Bud Hulsey	(United States) Harry Washburn	A.C. Cars Ltd.	AC Ace	166	
21st	34	GT2.0	(United States) Mike Rothschild	(United States) Bob Grossman	A.C. Cars Ltd.	AC Ace	166	
22nd	33	GT2.0	(United States) James Johnston (United States) William Bradley	(United States) Bud Seaverns	S. H. Arnolt Inc	Arnolt Bolide	165	
23rd	65	S850	(United States) David Cunnigham	(United States) John Fulp	Luigi Chinetti Motors	Osca S750	152	
24th	39	GT1.6	(Canada) Fred Hayes	(Canada) Ed Leavens	British Motor Corp.	MG A Twin Cam	160	
25th	55	GT1.3	(United States) Charles Evans (United States) Jay Chamberlain	(United States) Sam Weiss	Lotus Cars USA	Lotus Elite	158	
26th	3	GT5.0	(United States) Fred Gamble (United States) Bill Wuestfhoff	(United States) Jim Jeffords	Camoradi USA	Chevrolet Corvette C1	157	
27th	48	GT1.3	(United States) William Milliken, Jr.	(United States) Cameron Argetsinger	Cameron Argetsinger	Alfa Romeo Giuletta Veloce	156	
28th	77	GT2.0	(United States) Tony O'Sullivan (United States) Jef Stevens	(United Kingdom) Peter Procter	Tony O'Sullivan	AC Ace	151	
DNF	25	S3.0	(United States) Walt Hansgen	(United States) Ed Crawford	Jaguar Distributors of New York	Maserati Tipo 61	149	Differential
29th	40	GT1.6	(United States) Jack Flaherty	(United States) Jim Parkinson	British Motor Corp.	MG A Twin Cam	148	
30th	51	GT1.3	(United States) Louis Comito (United States) Bob Richardson	(United States) Ross Durant, Jr.	Ross Durant, Jr.	Alfa Romeo Giuletta Veloce	143	
31st	52	GT1.3	(United States) Chuck Kessinger (United States) Ken Gardner	(United States) Stephen A. McClellan, Jr.	Dr. Ray Martinez	Alfa Romeo Giuletta Veloce	143	
32nd	4	GT5.0	(United States) Jim Jeffords	(United States) Fred Gamble	Camoradi USA	Chevrolet Corvette C1	143	
33rd	18	GT3.0	(United Kingdom) Peter Riley	(United Kingdom) Jack Sears	British Motor Corp.	Austin-Healey 3000	141	
34th	26	S3.0	(United States) Duncan Black	(United States) Charlemagne Tower	Charlemagne Tower	Daimler SP250	137	
DNF	23	S3.0	(United Kingdom) Stirling Moss	(United States) Dan Gurney	Camoradi USA	Maserati Tipo 61	136	Transmission failure
NC	5	GT5.0	(United States) Delmo Johnson	(United States) Dave Morgan	Johnson Chevrolet Co.	Chevrolet Corvette C1	134	
DNF	46	S1.6	(Argentina) Pedro von Döry (Argentina) Anton von Döry	(Argentina) Roberto Miéres	Anton von Döry	Porsche 718 RSK	133	Broken cam follower
NC	37	S1.6	(United States) John Masterson (United States) Norman Babcock	(United States) Dean Patterson	Elva Distributors USA	Elva-Climax Courier	131	
NC	60	S1.15	(United States) Ed Costley	(United States) Pete Harrison	Edgar M. Costley	Elva-Climax Mk IV	131	
DNF	28	S2.0	(Mexico) Ricardo Rodríguez	(Mexico) Pedro Rodríguez	North American Racing Team	Dino 196 S	126	Clutch failure
DNF	7	S3.0	(United States) Chuck Daigh	(United States) Richie Ginther	North American Racing Team	Ferrari 250 TR 59/60	123	Water & oil leak
NC	66	S850	(United States) Ray Cuomo	(United States) Paul Richards	Roosevelt Automobiles	Fiat-Abarth 750S	115	
NC	32	GT2.0	(United States) Tom Payne	(United States) Robert Gary	S. H. Arnolt Inc	Arnolt Bolide	99	
NC	68	S1.6	(United States) Charles Wallace (United States) Charlie Kolb	(United States) William Horton	Elva Distributors USA	Elva-Climax Courier	92	
DNF	43	S1.6	(United Kingdom) Graham Hill	(Sweden) Jo Bonnier	Joakim Bonnier	Porsche 718 RS 60	87	Engine
DNF	53	GT1.3	(United States) Ralph Troiano (United States) George Waltman	(United States) Art Swanson	Racing Associates of New England	Alfa Romeo Giuletta Veloce	70	Axle
NC	61	S1.0	(United Kingdom) John Sprinzel	(United States) John Lumkin	Donald Healey, Ltd.	Austin-Healey Sebring Sprite	62	
DNF	35	GT2.0	(United States) Bob Mazzi (United States) Frank Schroeder	(United States) Fred Moore	A. C. Car Ltd	AC Ace	61	Left rear wheel
DNF	30	GT2.0	(United States) Ike Williamson	(United States) James Forno	Morgan Motors Ltd.	Morgan Plus 4	60	Broken front hub
DNF	57	GT1.3	(United States) Frank Bott	(United States) Phil Forno	Lotus Cars USA	Lotus Elite	57	Accident
DNF	19	GT3.0	(United States) John Colgate	(United States) Fred Spross	British Motor Corp.	Austin-Healey 300	54	Accident
DNF	2	GT5.0	(United States) Dick Thompson	(United States) Fred Windridge	Jaguar Distributors of New York	Chevrolet Corvette C1	41	Engine
DNF	64	S850	(United States) Denise McCluggage	(United States) Pinkie Windridge	Camoradi USA	Osca S187	34	Oil loss => bearing jammed
DNF	41	GT1.6	(United States) John Cuevas	(Sweden) Ulf Norinder	Quiver Enterprises	Porsche 356A Carrera GT GS Speedster	33	Broken crankshaft
DNF	15	GT3.0	(Italy) Gianni Balzarini	(Italy) Carlo Maria Abate	Scuderia Serenissima	Ferrari 250 GT	28	
DNF	1	GT5.0	(United States) Briggs Cunningham	(United States) John Fitch	Jaguar Distributors of New York	Chevrolet Corvette C1	27	Rear hub => accident
DNF	67	S850	(United States) Victor Lukens	(United States) Fred Haynes	Racemasters	Bandini GT	27	Radiator damaged
DNF	27	S2.0	(United States) Hap Sharp	(United States) Jim Hall	Hap Sharp	Cooper-Maserati Monaco T49	26	Broken piston
DNF	49	GT1.3	(United States) Charlie Rainville	(United States) Jake Kaplan	Jake Kaplan	Alfa Romeo Giuletta Veloce	16	Broken connection rod
DNF	56	GT1.3	(United States) Jim Hughes	(United States) Sam Weiss	Lotus Cars USA	Lotus Elite	5	Fatal accident (Hughes)
DNF	38	GT1.6	(United Kingdom) Colin Escott	(United Kingdom) Ted Lund	British Motor Corp.	MG A Twin Cam	3	Broken valve
DNF	22	S3.0	(United States) Carroll Shelby	(United States) Masten Gregory	Camoradi USA	Maserati Tipo 61	3	Engine
DNF	46	S1.6	(United States) Ernie Erickson	(United States) Don Sesslar	Carl Erickson Co.	Porsche 718 RSK	1	Timing gear jammed
DNS	21	S3.0	(United Kingdom) Stirling Moss	(United States) Dan Gurney	Camoradi USA	Maserati Tipo 61		Engine
DNQ	73	S1.15	(United States) Bob Grimes	(United States) Paul Hill	Elva Distributors USA	Elva-Climax Mk. IV		Reserve
DNQ	75	S850	(United States) Otto Linton	(United States) Francis Ginther	John Miles	Osca S750		Reserve
DNQ	79	GT3.0	(United States) Mel Siegel	(United States) Harry Fry	London Motors Inc.	Austin-Healey 3000		Reserve
DNS	81	GT3.0	(United States) Laurence Gandolfi (United States) Paul O'Shea	(United States) Nim York	Lewis Engineering Co.	Mercedes-Benz 300 SL		No spare brakes
DNS	T2	GT3.0	(United Kingdom) Peter RIley (United States) John Colgate	(United Kingdom) Jack Sears (United States) Fred Spross	British Motor Corp.	Austin-Healey 3000		practised only
DNS	T	GT1.6			British Motor Corp.	MG A Twin Cam		practised only

- Fastest Lap: Chuck Daigh, 3:18.14secs (94.479 mph)

=== Class Winners ===
Class	Winners		
Sports 3000 – Class 12S	8	Ferrari 250 TR 59/60	Lovely / Nethercutt
Sports 2500 – Class 11S		No starters	
Sports 2000 – Class 10S		No classified finishers	
Sports 1600 – Class 9S	42	Porsche 718 RS 60	Herrmann / Gendebien
Sports 1150 – Class 7S	58	Lola-Climax Mk.1	Vögele / Ashdown
Sports 1100 – Class 6S		No classified finishers	
Sports 850 – Class 5S	63	Osca S750	Bentley / Gordon
Grand Touring 5000 – Class 14G	6	Chevrolet Corvette C1	Fritts / Hall
Grand Touring 3000 – Class 12G	16	Ferrari 250 GT California	Abate / Scarlatti / Serena
Grand Touring 2000 – Class 10G	31	Arnolt Bolide	Goldman / Durbin
Grand Touring 1600 – Class 9G	72	Porsche 356A Carrera	Dungan / Sheppard
Grand Touring 1300 – Class 8G	54	Alfa Romeo Giuletta Spider Veloce	van Beuren / Velásquez / Velásquez

== Standings after the race ==
=== FIA World Sportscar Championship ===
Pos	Championship	Points
1=	(Italy) Ferrari	12
1=	(West Germany) Porsche	12
3	(Italy) Maserati	3

- Note: Only the top five positions are included in this set of standings.

Championship points were awarded for the first six places in each race in the order of 8-6-4-3-2-1. Manufacturers were only awarded points for their highest finishing car with no points awarded for positions filled by additional cars. Only the best 3 results out of the 5 races could be retained by each manufacturer. Points earned but not counted towards the championship totals are listed within brackets in the above table.

World Sportscar Championship
Previous race: 1000 km Buenos Aires	1960 season	Next race: Targa Florio

FIA GT Cup
Previous race: 4 Hours of Sebring	1960 season	Next race: 1000 km Nürburgring
