= Karl Stangl =

Austrian sailor

Personal information
- Nationality: Austrian
- Born: 1 November 1930
- Died: November 30, 2000 (aged 70) near Fortingall, Scotland

Sport
- Sport: Sailing

Karl Stangl (1 November 1930 – 30 November 2000) was an Austrian sailor. He competed in the Dragon event at the 1972 Summer Olympics.

Stangl died on 30 November 2000 when the Piper Aerostar he was piloting crashed near Fortingall.
