= 1960 World Sportscar Championship =

Racing tournament

Seasons
- ← 1959 1961 →

The 1960 World Sportscar Championship was the eighth FIA World Sportscar Championship. It was contested over a five race series commencing 31 January 1960 and ending 26 June 1960.

The championship was won by Ferrari.

== Championship summary ==
The 1000 km Buenos Aires returned to the calendar at the expense of the RAC Tourist Trophy, which formed part of the inaugural FIA GT Cup.

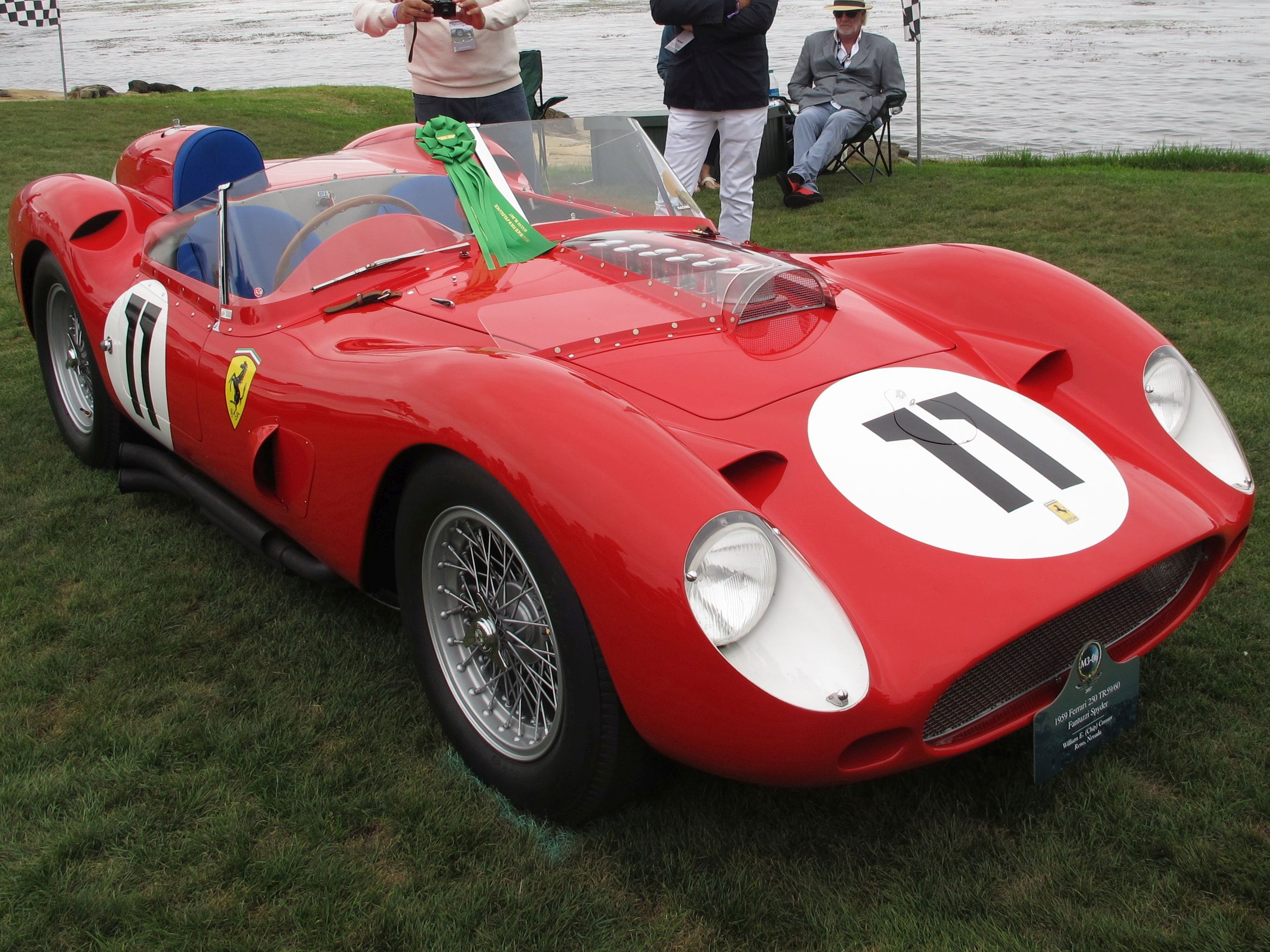
Ferrari won the championship with its 250 TR 59/60 (pictured) & Dino 246 models

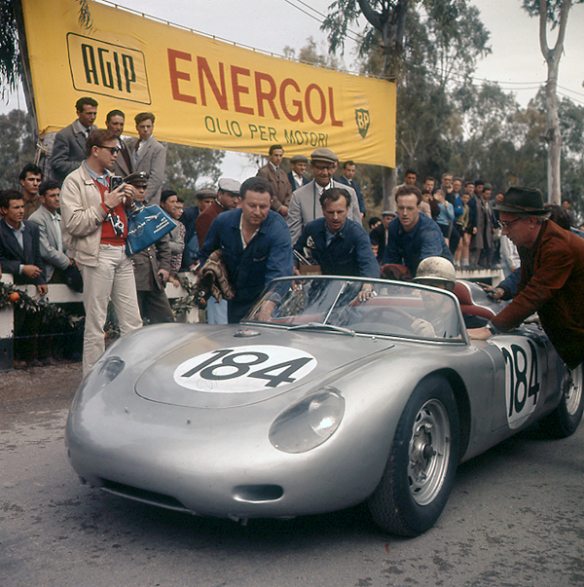
Winning Porsche 718 RS 60 at the Targa Florio on 8 May 1960, driven by Jo Bonnier. Photo: Louis Klemantaski.

The championship still comprised five qualifying rounds. They were the 1000 km Buenos Aires the 12 Hours of Sebring, the Targa Florio, the Nürburgring 1000 km, with the 24 Hours of Le Mans being the final round.

With reigning champion, Aston Martin works cars not returning to defend their title, this left the door wide open for Scuderia Ferrari to reclaim the title. This wasn’t to be plain sailing as the nearest rivals turned out to be the smaller Porsches. The Italian manufacturer started stronger with Phil Hill and Cliff Allison taking the spoils in Argentina. Next was the annual trip to Florida, for the 12 Hours of Sebring, however the factory Ferrari and Porsche were not present because of the rule change by the FIA, allowing the organisers to permit use of only certain brands of fuel, As a result, the race was between privateers with works-backed drivers, with Porsche coming out on top. The mid-way point of the championship, saw the cars return to Europe for the Targa Florio. The twisty mountains roads of Sicily favoured the more agile car, like the Porsche which duly took the victory.

The championship then moved into West Germany, the annual trip to the Nürburgring Nordschleife. To the surprise of everyone, the spoils went to an American team, Camoradi/USA Racing Team, whose Maserati was driven by Stirling Moss and Dan Gurney. This result meant, going into the final round, the only way Ferrari could stop Porsche winning the title was to win the 24 Hours of Le Mans, and that was exactly what they did.

== Schedule ==
Round	Date	Event	Circuit or Location	Winning drivers	Winning team	Winning car	Results
1	January 31	(Argentina) 1000 km Buenos Aires	Autódromo Municipal-Avenida Paz	(United States) Phil Hill (United Kingdom) Cliff Allison	(Italy) Scuderia Ferrari	(Italy) Ferrari 250 TR 59/60	Results
2	March 26	(United States) Sebring International Grand Prix of Endurance for the Amoco Trophy	Sebring International Raceway	(West Germany) Hans Herrmann (Belgium) Olivier Gendebien	(Sweden) Joakim Bonnier	(West Germany) Porsche 718 RS 60	Results
3	May 8	(Italy) 44° Targa Florio	Circuito Piccolo delle Madonie	(Sweden) Jo Bonnier (West Germany) Hans Herrmann	(West Germany) Porsche KG	(West Germany) Porsche 718 RS 60	Results
4	May 22	(West Germany) VI. Internationales ADAC 1000 Kilometer Rennen	Nürburgring	(United Kingdom) Stirling Moss (United States) Dan Gurney	(United States) Camoradi / USA Racing Team	(Italy) Maserati Tipo 61	Results
5	June 25-26	(France) 24 Heures du Mans	Circuit de la Sarthe	(Belgium) Olivier Gendebien (Belgium) Paul Frère	(Italy) Scuderia Ferrari	(Italy) Ferrari 250 TR 59/60	Results

== Points system ==
- Championship points were awarded to manufacturers for the first six places in each race in the order of 8-6-4-3-2-1.
- Manufacturers were awarded points only for their highest finishing car with no points awarded for positions filled by additional cars.
- Only the best three results out of the five races could be retained by each manufacturer.
- Points earned but not counted towards the championship totals are listed within brackets in the table below.

== Championship standings ==
Pos	Manufacturer	(Argentina) BUE	(United States) SEB	(Italy) TGA	(West Germany) NÜR	(France) LMS	Total
1^{†}	(Italy) Ferrari	8	(4)	6	(4)	8	22 (30)
2	(Germany) Porsche	(4)	8	8	6		22 (26)
3	(Italy) Maserati	3			8		11
4	(United Kingdom) Aston Martin					4	4

† - Ferrari and Porsche finished equal first on net points but Ferrari was awarded the championship based on gross points scored.

== The cars ==
The following models contributed to the net championship point scores of their respective manufacturers.

- Ferrari 250 TR 59/60 & Ferrari Dino 246 S
- Porsche 718 RS 60
- Maserati 300S & Maserati Tipo 61
- Aston Martin DBR1/300
