= Harry Blanchard =

American racing driver (1929–1960)

- Born: June 13, 1929; Burlington, Vermont, U.S.
- Died: January 31, 1960 (aged 30); Buenos Aires, Argentina

Formula One World Championship career
- Nationality: (United States) American
- Active years: 1959
- Team: private Porsche
- Entries: 1
- Championships: 0
- Wins: 0
- Podiums: 0
- Career points: 0
- Pole positions: 0
- Fastest laps: 0
- First entry: 1959 United States Grand Prix

Harry Cutler Blanchard (June 13, 1929, Burlington, Vermont – January 31, 1960, Buenos Aires, Argentina) was an American racecar driver.

Blanchard began his racing career by racing sports cars in the United States. first and only Formula One start was in the 1959 United States Grand Prix, located at Sebring, with a Porsche RSK Formula 2 car. He finished the race in seventh, four laps behind the winner Bruce McLaren. In January 1960, Blanchard was killed in a crash during the 1000 km Buenos Aires while competing in a Porsche 718 RSK.

== Complete Formula One results ==
(key)

Year	Entrant	Chassis	Engine	1	2	3	4	5	6	7	8	9	WDC	Points
1959	Blanchard Auto Co.	Porsche RSK	Porsche Flat-4	MON	500	NED	FRA	GBR	GER	POR	ITA	USA; 7	NC	0
