= Forlanini =

Forlanini is an Italian surname. Notable people with the surname include:

- Carlo Forlanini (1847–1918), Italian physician
- Enrico Forlanini (1848–1930), Italian engineer, inventor, and aeronautical pioneer

== See also ==
- Forlanini (district of Milan)
