= Porsche 718 =

Sports racing car

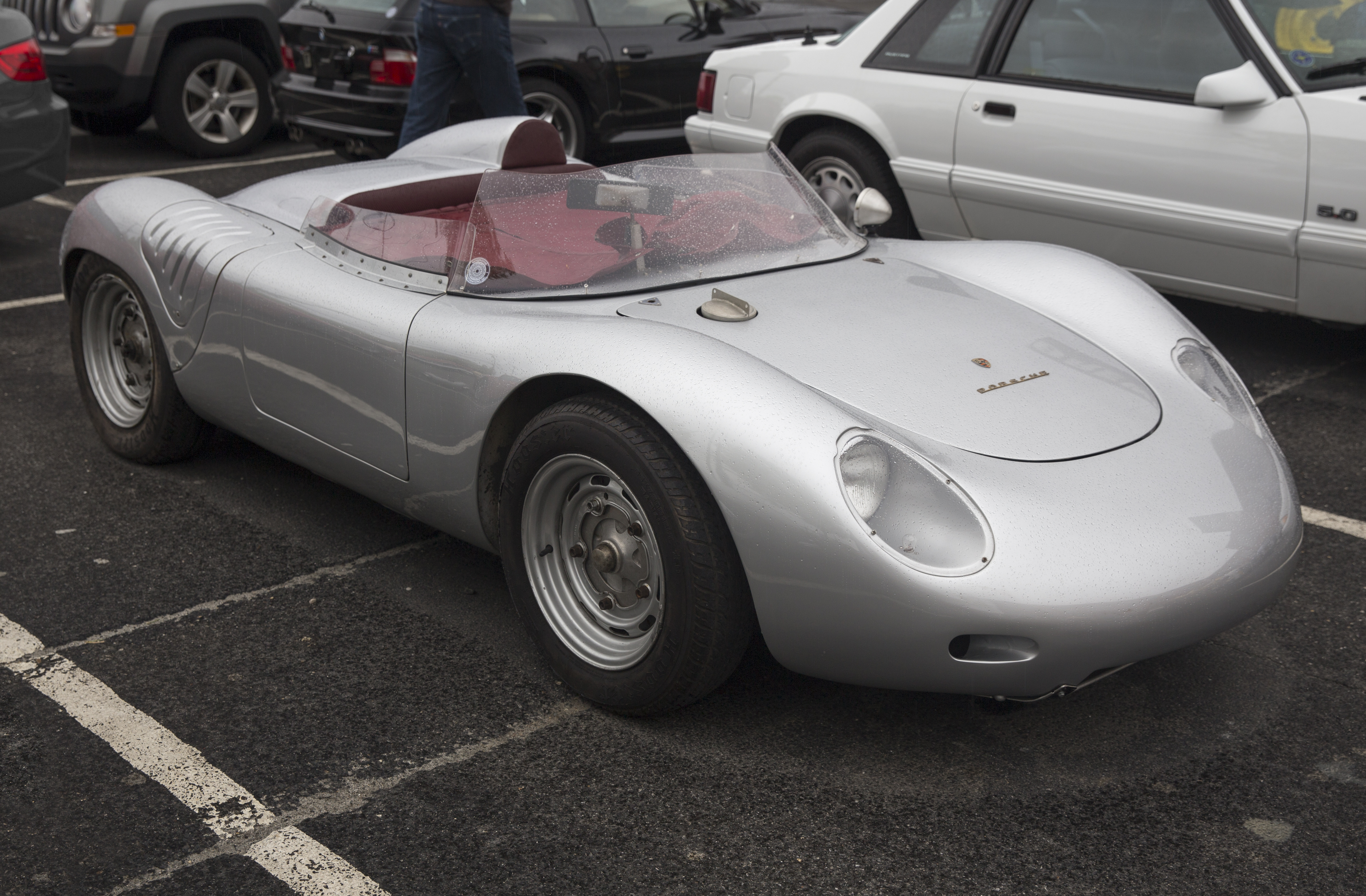
- The Porsche 718 RSK Spyder, which was raced at the 1959 Targa Florio
- Category: Sportscar, F1, F2
- Constructor: Porsche
- Designer: Wilhelm Hild
- Predecessor: Porsche 550

Technical specifications
- Chassis: Spaceframe chassis
- Suspension (front): torsion bars, telescopic shock absorbers, anti-roll bar
- Suspension (rear): Watt-linkage, coil springs over telescopic shock absorbers
- Engine: Type 547 1,498 cc (91.4 cu in) DOHC F4 boxer engine normally aspirated Mid-engined
- Transmission: 5-speed manual
- Weight: 570 kg (1,256.6 lb)
- Fuel: Petrol

Competition history
- Notable entrants: Porsche System Engineering, Ecurie Maarsbergen
- Notable drivers: Graham Hill, Stirling Moss, Wolfgang von Trips, Edgar Barth, Carel Godin de Beaufort, Jo Bonnier, Dan Gurney, Hans Herrmann, Nino Vaccarella, Gerhard Mitter
- Debut: 1957 Le Mans – Sportscars; 1960 Italian Grand Prix – F1
Races	Wins	Poles	F/Laps
28 (F1)	0 (F1); 3 (Targa Florio); 1 (12 Hrs of Sebring)	0	0
- Teams' Championships: 0
- Constructors' Championships: 0
- Drivers' Championships: 5 (European Hill Climb)

The Porsche 718 is a series of one- or two-seat sports-racing cars built by Porsche from 1957 to 1962. An open-wheel single-seat model was developed for Formula racing.

== Details ==
The 718 was a development of the successful Porsche 550A with improvements made to the body work and suspension. The car's full name is 718 RSK, where "RS" stands for RennSport (sports-racing) and the "K" reflects the shape of the car's revised torsion-bar suspension. It had a mid-engined layout and used the 142 horsepower (106 kW) 1.5-litre Porsche 547/3 quad-cam "Fuhrmann" engine introduced in the 550A.

== Variations ==
=== 718 RSK Mittellenker ===
In 1957 the Fédération Internationale de l'Automobile (FIA) changed their rules to allow cars with enveloping bodywork to compete in Formula 2 races. In the 1954 and 1955 F1 seasons, Mercedes already had entered streamlined versions of the Mercedes-Benz W196 at fast tracks like Reims and Monza. In the 1957 German Grand Prix on the very long Nürburgring, also Formula Two (F2) cars were allowed. Porsche entered three Porsche 550 1500RS Spyders. Changes to the cars were minimal, being limited to removing the passenger seats and spare tires.

For 1958 Porsche fielded a modified 718, called the RSK Mittellenker (centre-steer), for F2 events. The bodywork for this car was only slightly different from the sportscar model, but the single seat was now in the centre of the cockpit, with the steering wheel, pedals, and shift lever relocated to accommodate the change and a fairing enclosing more of the cockpit opening. Jean Behra drove the car to a win at the F2 event at Reims that year. At the 1958 German Grand Prix at the Nürburgring, driver Edgar Barth placed sixth overall and second in the F2 class. At the 1958 Berlin Grand Prix at the fast AVUS with the banked North turn the car won both its heat and the F2 class in the hands of driver Masten Gregory.

=== 718/2 ===
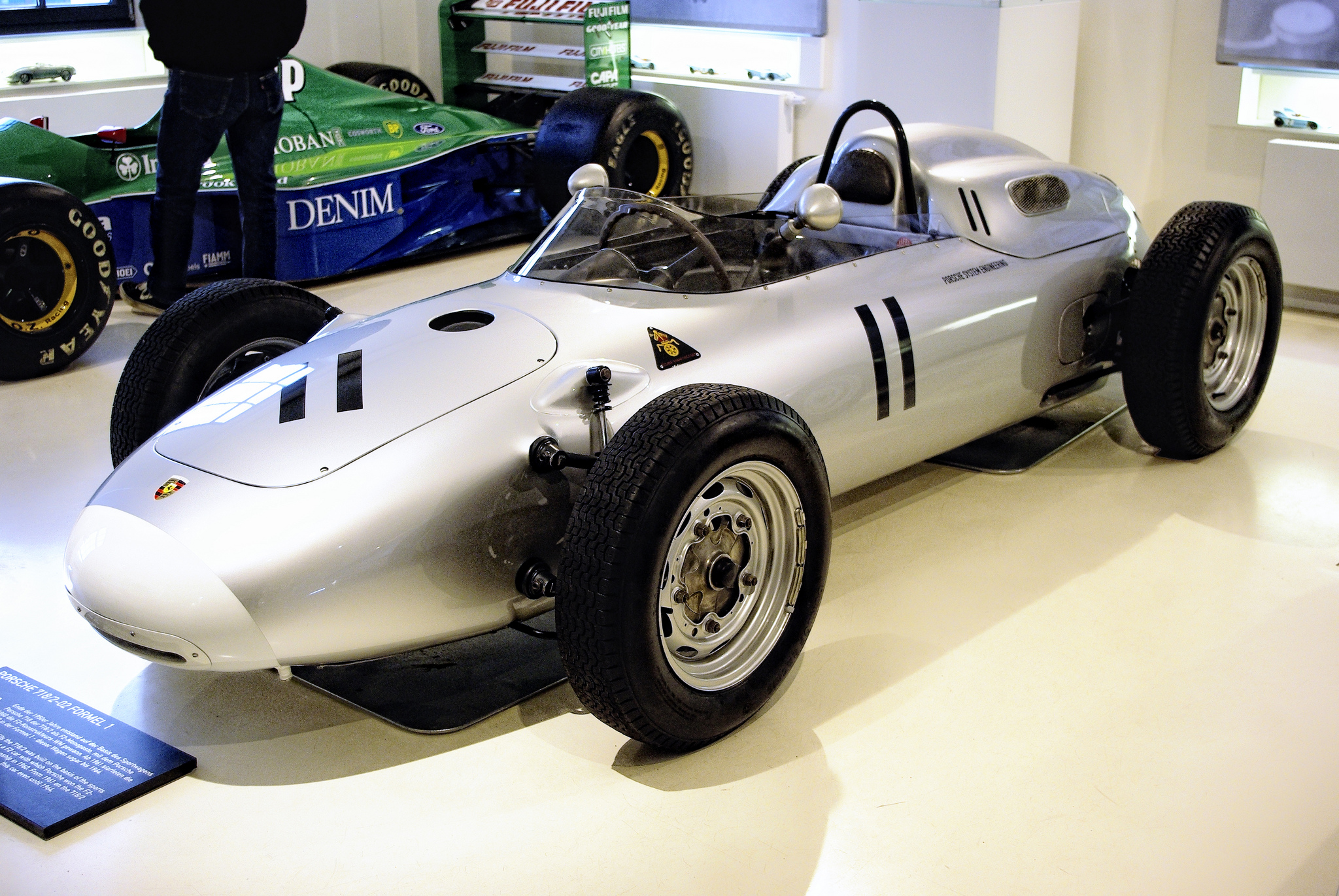
Porsche 718 2-02

In 1959 Porsche unveiled the prototype of an open-wheeled car called the Porsche 718/2 that married the 718's mechanicals with a narrow monoposto body. The unpainted car was entered in the 1959 Monaco Grand Prix, where driver Wolfgang von Trips qualified twelfth, but crashed on the second lap of the race. At Reims driver Joakim Bonnier finished third. For 1960 the production 718/2, starting with chassis number 718201, received revised bodywork, a 6-speed transaxle, and a wheelbase extended by 100 mm (3.9 in). A total of five cars were built.

In October 1958 the FIA announced another change to the regulations for Formula One (F1). Beginning with the 1961 season, engine capacity would be limited to the same 1.5 litres as Formula Two. This allowed Porsche to use their 718/2s almost unchanged in F1.

=== RS 60 ===
For the 1960 season the FIA made changes to the regulation regarding the windscreen and cockpit size. Applying these changes, together with an optional larger 1.6-litre Type 547/3 engine developing 160 horsepower (120 kW) and a new double wishbone rear suspension, resulted in the RS 60 model. The RS 60 brought Porsche a 1-2 victory at the 1960 12 Hours of Sebring with the factory car driven by Hans Herrmann and Olivier Gendebien ahead of the American Brumos entry. As in 1959, Porsche won the 1960 Targa Florio, now with Hans Herrmann being joined on the winner podium by Jo Bonnier and Graham Hill. The RS 60 also ensured that Porsche successfully defended their European Hill Climb Championship for the third year in a row.

=== RS 61 ===
For 1961 the model name was changed to "RS 61" although it was almost identical to the RS 60. An RS 61 won the European Hill Climb Championship.

=== W-RS ===
The W-RS version was developed in 1961. Initially fitted with a 4-cylinder engine, the car was later fitted with Porsche's air-cooled Type 771 2.0 L flat-eight engine which produced 240 horsepower (180 kW). A W-RS finished 8th at Le Mans in 1963. The W-RS continued Porsche's success in the European Hill Climb Championship with Edgar Barth claiming the title in 1963. Porsche would go on to win a European Hill Climb Championship every year until 1982, a total of 42 titles.

The W-RS continued racing until 1964 when it was replaced by the 904.

=== 718 GTR Coupé ===
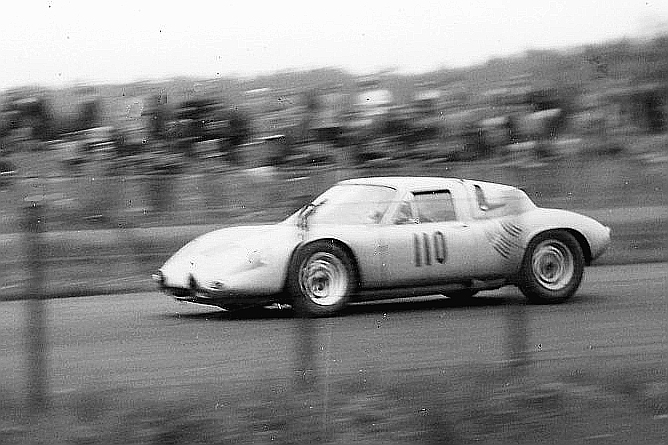
Gurney/Bonnier Porsche 718 GTR at the Nürburgring in 1962.

A Coupé version was developed from the RS 61. Initially fitted with a 4-cylinder engine, this car was also upgraded to an 8-cylinder F1 derived engine which produced 210 horsepower (160 kW). The car was also fitted with disc brakes. A GTR Coupé enabled drivers Jo Bonnier and Carlo Maria Abate to win the Targa Florio in 1963 once more.

== Racing history ==
=== Endurance / sportscar racing ===
The 718 made its racing debut at the 1957 24 Hours of Le Mans driven by Umberto Maglioli and Edgar Barth. The car failed to finish the race due to an accident.

In 1958, the RSK Spyder #29 (1.6-litre engine) finished third overall at Le Mans guided by Jean Behra and Hans Herrmann. Right after them, in fourth place overall and first in class came the RSK #31 (1.5-litre engine), piloted by Edgar Barth and Paul Frère. Jean Behra also drove one of the cars home finishing second at the Targa Florio (an FIA World Sportscar Championship race in 1955 and from 1958 to 1973).

In 1959, the car, driven by Edgar Barth and Wolfgang Seidel, achieved overall victory at the 1959 Targa Florio for its first time. A 718 also won the European Hill Climb Championship in both 1958 and 1959.

The 1960 12 Hours of Sebring 1-2 win was the first non-Targa FIA World Sportscar Championship overall win for Porsche. A 718 RS60 won the 1960 Targa Florio, making it two wins in the 1960 World Sportscar Championship that only had 5 events of which 3 were counted. Together with a 2nd place at the Nürburgring, Porsche was tied with Ferrari at 22 points, but the tie was broken with Ferrari having two 3rd places discarded, Porsche only one.

For 1961, Ferrari put the V6 Dino engine not only in the back of the F1 cars, but also into the rear-mid-engine Ferrari SP. With good handling and superior power from 2.4 litres, Ferrari won the Targa in 1961 and 1962. In 1963, the Scuderia even moved the big V12 behind the driver, starting the Ferrari P series, and winning 1963 Le Mans. The principle pioneered by Benz in the 1920s and Porsche since the 1930s finally was adopted by the big engine sportscars.

In 1961 Masten Gregory and Bob Holbert piloted a 718/4 RS Spyder to a class win at Le Mans. In the 1963 Targa Florio, Porsche got a victory with a 718 GTR Coupé, making it three wins at that event for a 718 car despite coming short in 1961 and 1962.

=== Formula Two ===
Porsche made their F2 debut with victories at Reims and AVUS in 1958. In 1959 other RSK's were converted for single seater racing and at the XV B.A.R.C. '200' at Aintree in 1960 Porsche scored a 1–2–3 victory with Stirling Moss, Jo Bonnier and Graham Hill all in 718s. The feat was repeated again later in the year at the race at Zeltweg, Austria.

=== Formula One ===
Formula One switched to a 1.5-litre formula in 1961 and Porsche entered three 718s for Dan Gurney, Hans Herrmann and Jo Bonnier. Gurney scored three 2nd places (France, Italy and United States) taking him to 4th place in the Drivers' Championship. The 4-cylinder engine and the chassis were outdated, though. For the 1962 Formula One season, Porsche entered a new car, the 8-cylinder Porsche 804.

Carel Godin de Beaufort, a privateer, entered a 718 in F1 between 1961 and 1964. He was killed driving his 718 during practice for the 1964 German Grand Prix at the Nürburgring.

== Gallery ==
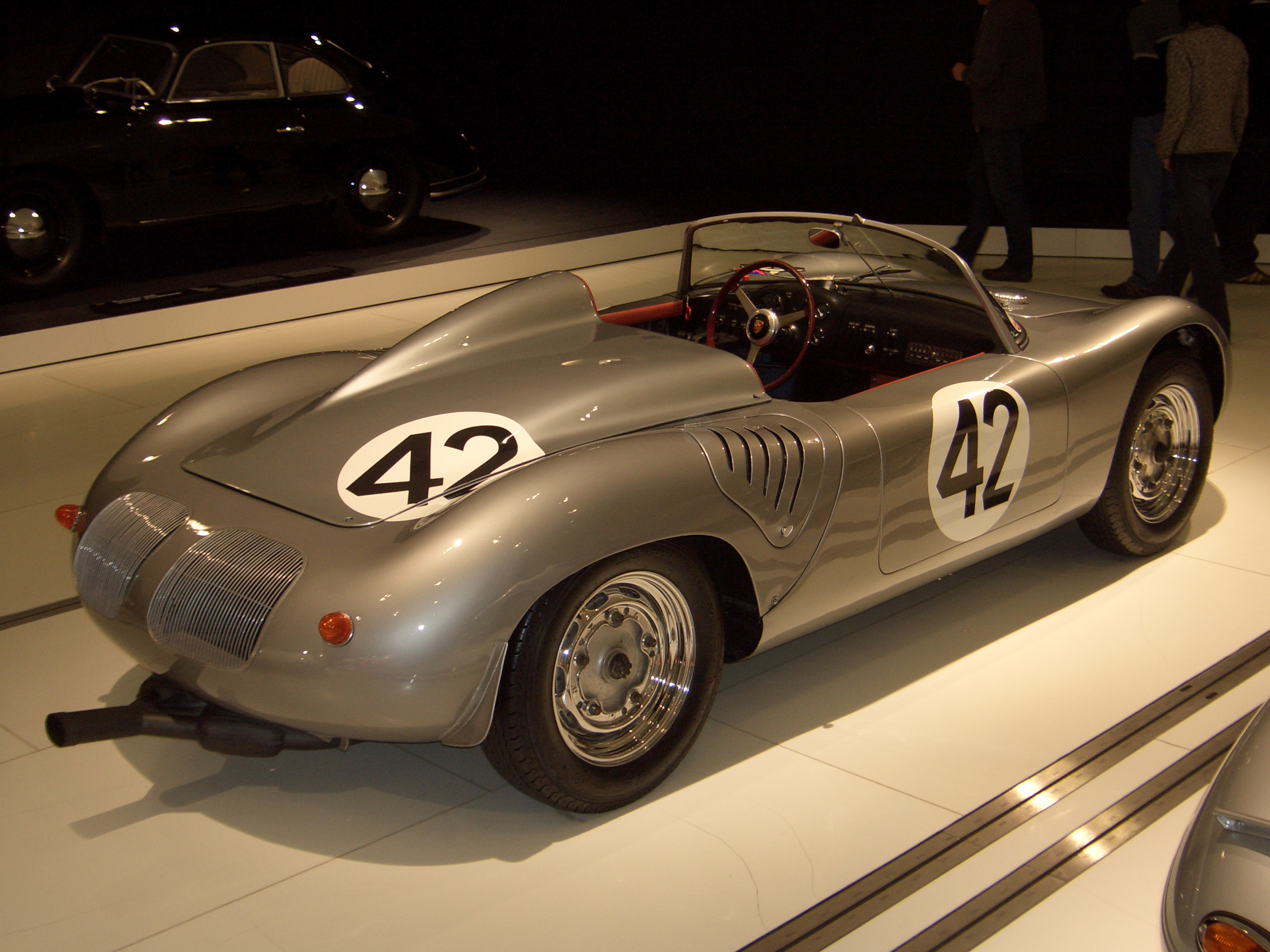
Porsche 718 RS60 Spyder

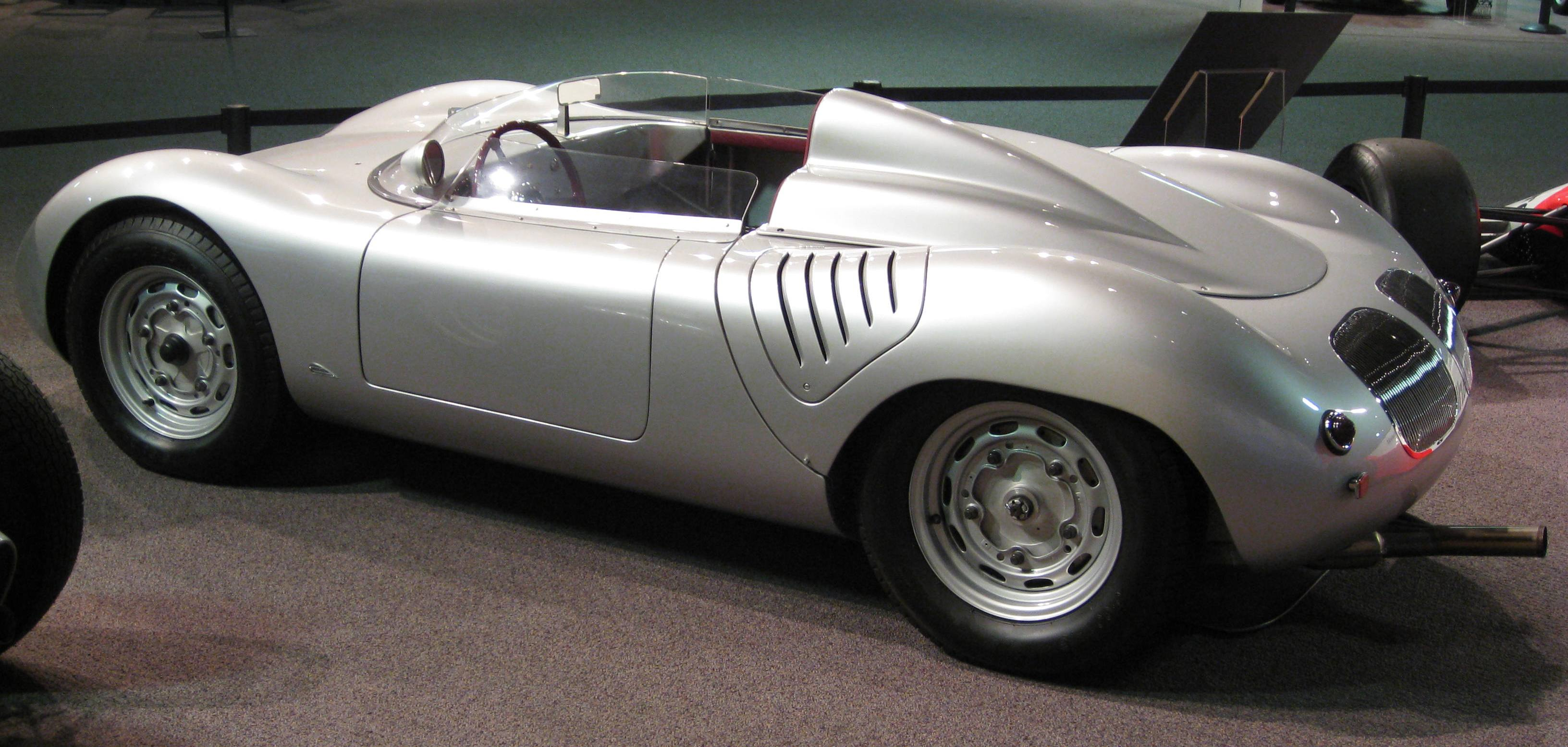
Porsche 718 RSK Spyder

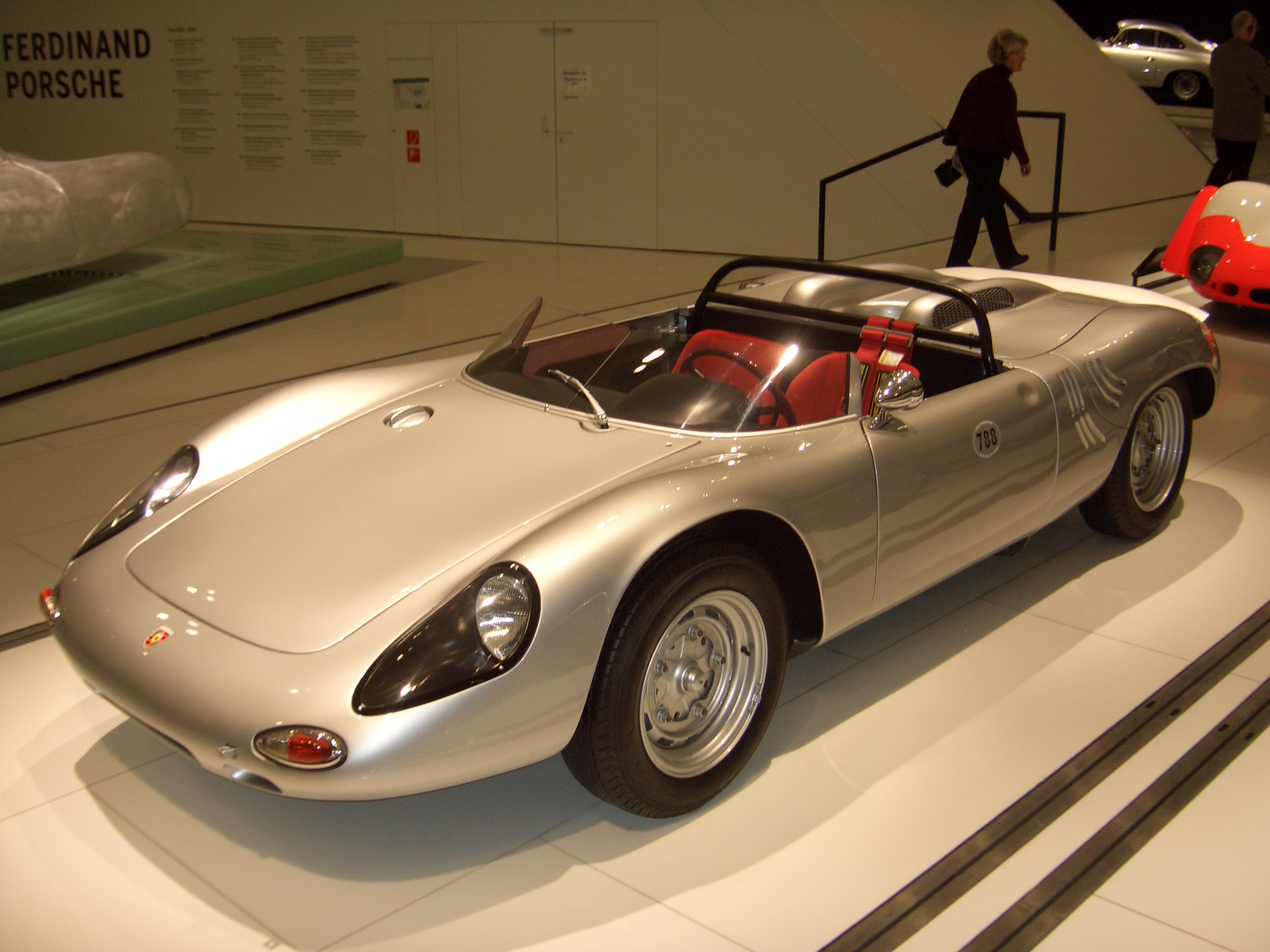
Porsche 718 W-RS Spyder

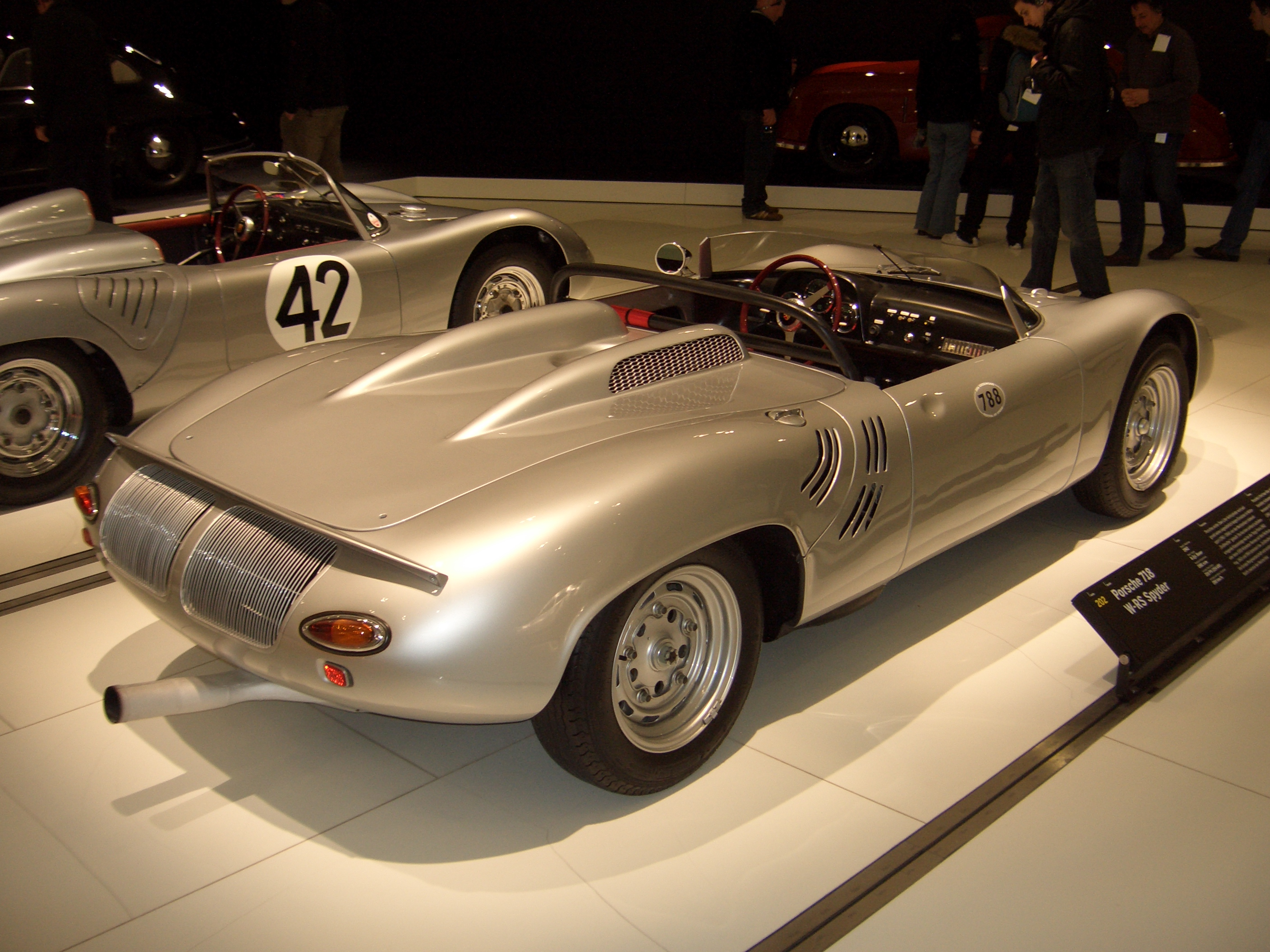
Porsche 718 W-RS Spyder

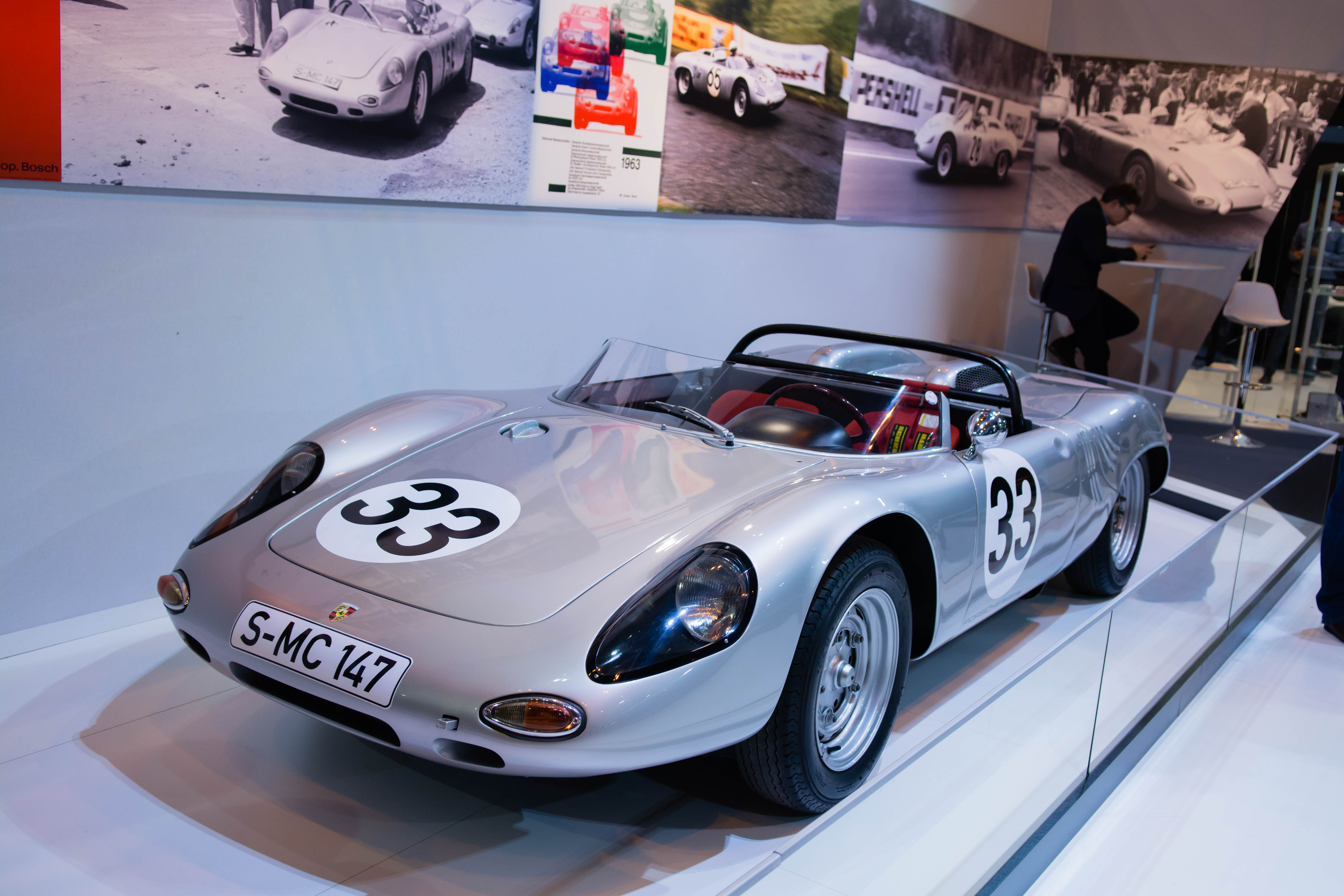
Porsche 718 W-RS Spyder at the 2016 Retromobile show in Paris

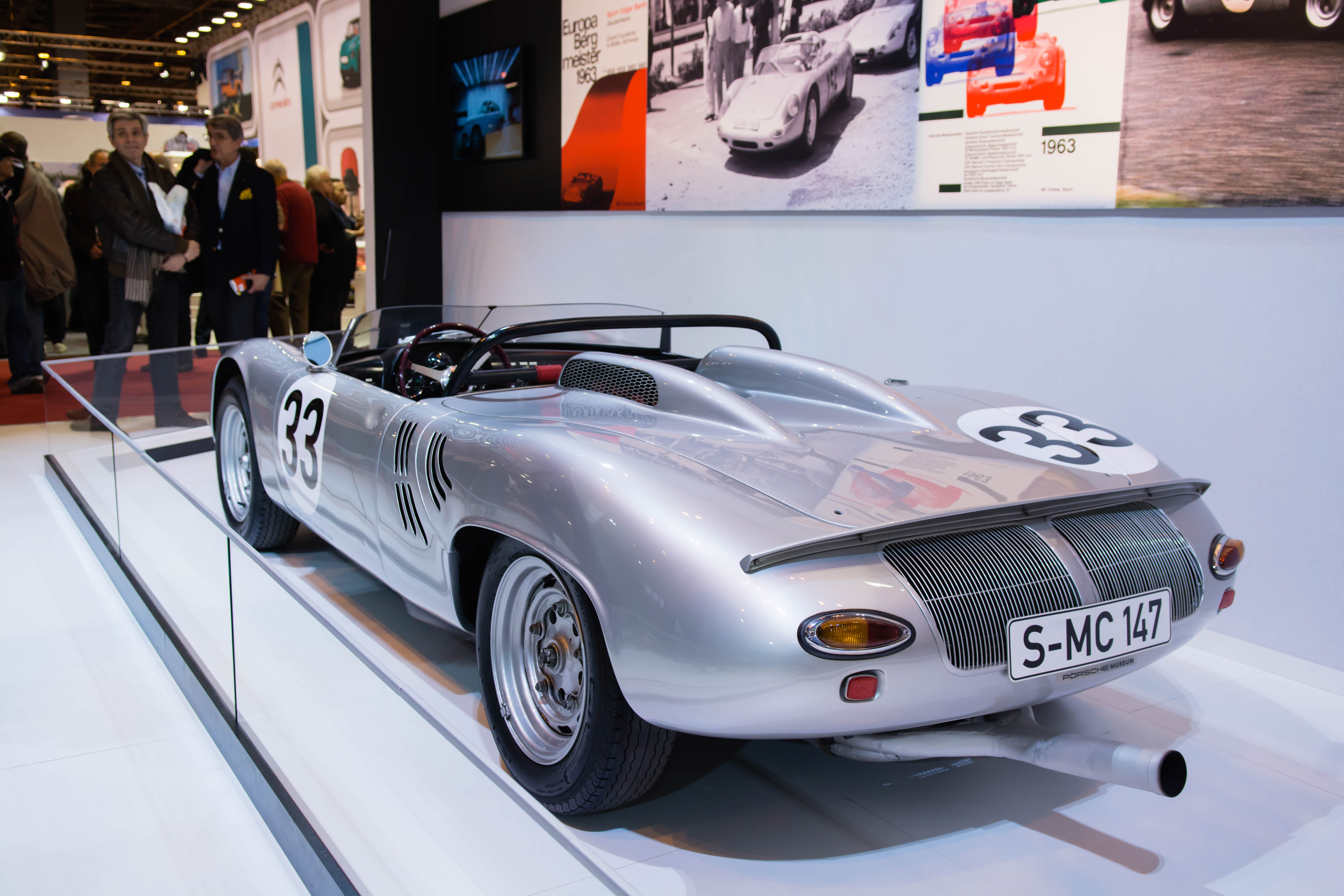
Porsche 718 W-RS Spyder at the 2016 Retromobile show in Paris

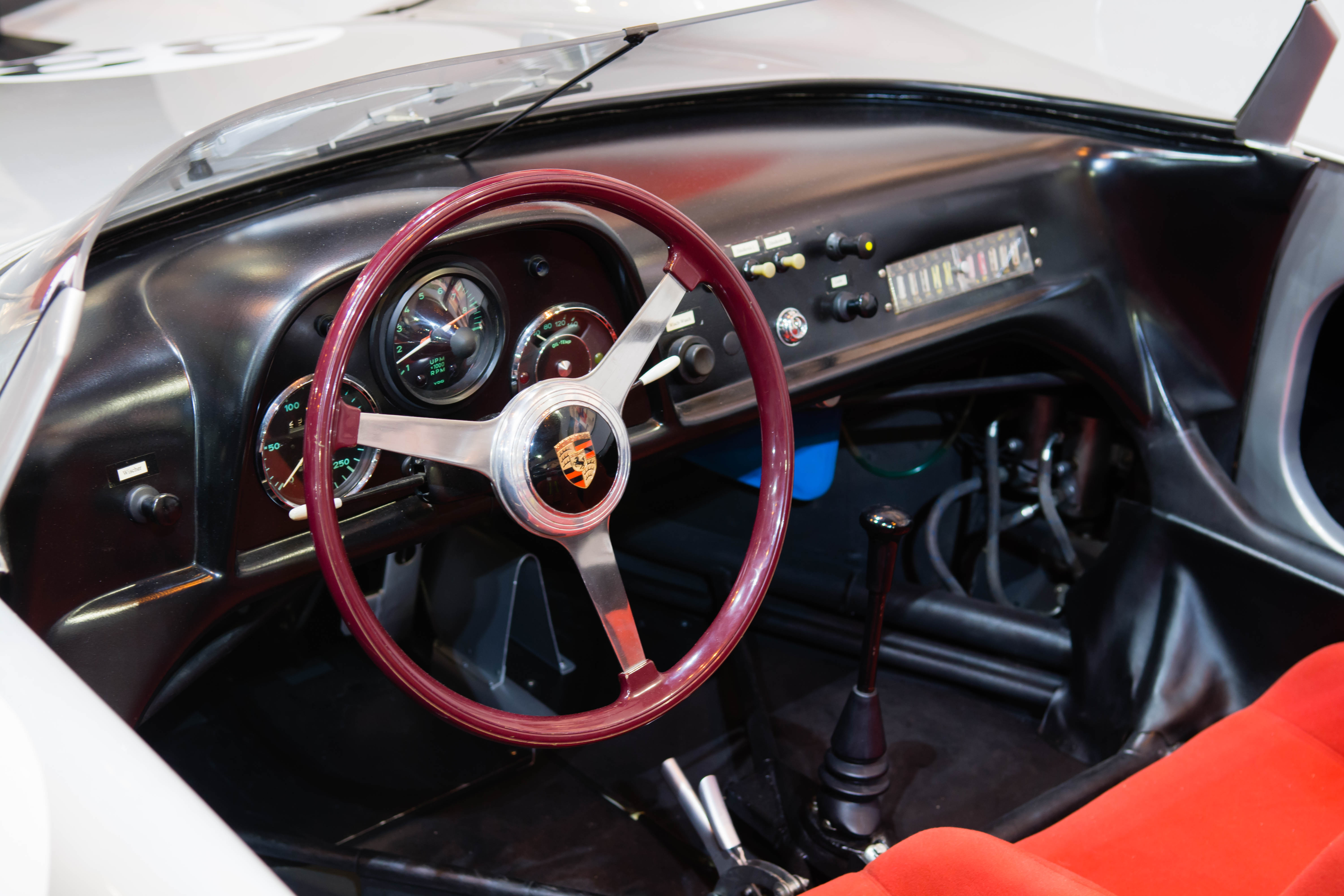
Porsche 718 W-RS Spyder at the 2016 Retromobile show in Paris

== See also ==
- Porsche 787 – Formula 1 car
- Porsche 804 – Formula 1 car
- Porsche in motorsport
