= 1959 Targa Florio =

The 43° Targa Florio was a motor race for sportscars held on 24 May 1959 on the Circuito Piccolo delle Madonie, Sicily, Italy. It was the second round of the 1959 F.I.A. World Sports Car Championship and the 43rd running of the Targa Florio. Early that year, the event founder, Vincenzo Florio died and his nephew Vincent Paladion promised to keep alive Florio's Targa. “The Targa must continue... Promise me!..”

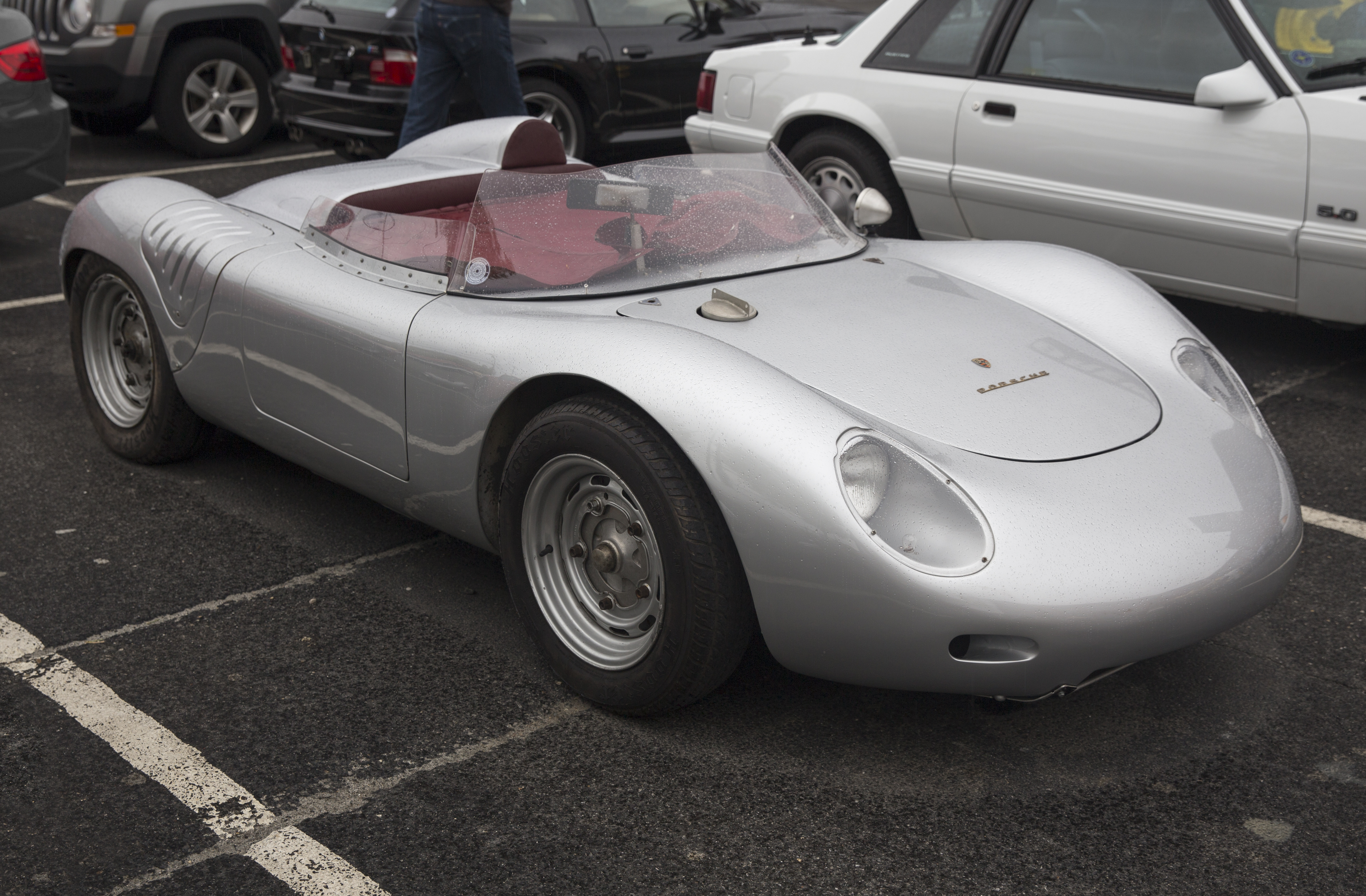
Edgar Barth and Wolfgang Seidel won the race driving a Porsche 718 RSK similar to this example.

After the five main cars of Ferrari and Porsche failed in a race of attrition, it was won by Edgar Barth and Wolfgang Seidel driving a Porsche 718 RSK, ahead of three more cars entered by Porsche KG. The 1-2-3-4 triumph was the first ever World Sports Car Championship race win for Porsche, and the fifth Targa victory for Stuttgart after 1922, 1924 and 1955 wins for Mercedes(-Benz). Umberto Maglioli and Fritz Huschke von Hanstein had won the 1956 Targa Florio for Porsche, but the Targa was not part of the World Championship that year. After 1955 as a one-off replacement, the Targa was a WSC event from 1958 to 1973. Porsche would not only win 11 Targa Florios in total, but also named their open top Porsche 911 after it.

== Report ==
=== Entry ===
The event attracted fewer cars than in previous years, with 59 racing cars registered for this event, instead of the 81 in 1958. Of the 59 cars registered, 58 arrived for practice with 52 qualifying for and starting the race.

Reigning champions, Ferrari had entered three of their latest 250 TR 59 for their squad of drivers; Phil Hill, Dan Gurney, Tony Brooks, Olivier Gendebien, Jean Behra and Cliff Allison. Aston Martin had sent only one car to Sebring, but elected to miss the 1959 Sicily event after taking part in 1958, yet won all three remaining 1959 championship races and the World Championship. Maserati was not participating which large cars, thus there were no other entrants in the S3.0 class. The main opposition was expected to come from the smaller S2.0 class, with two aging Maserati A6GCS/53, two 4-cylinder Ferrari 500 TRC and a (Ferrari) Dino 196 S with the V6 engine.

Porsche mainly used the Porsche 547/3 quad-cam "Fuhrmann" engine in the small Porsche 718 RSK sportscar and in the Porsche 356 GT, either as basic 1.5-litre for the S1.5 class, or enlarged to 1.6-litre for the S2.0 and GT2.6 classes. Thus, the two main works Porsche 718 RSK given to Formula One drivers Jo Bonnier/Wolfgang von Trips and Hans Herrmann/Umberto Maglioli had small engines far away from the capacity limit of their S2.0 class.

A third 718 with regular engine for the S1.5 class was given to Germans Edgar Barth and Wolfgang Seidel to compete against two OSCA MT4 and two older private Porsche 550.

=== Race ===
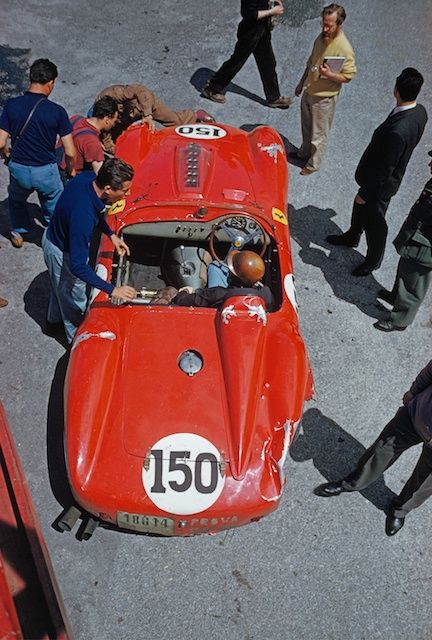
The Ferrari 250 Testa Rossa that had been crashed by Behra during the race, now with Brooks at the wheel.

The 1959 Targa was meant to be a Ferrari in-house battle, but it was not to be. The nimble Porsche No. 130 of Bonnier was leading, setting fastest lap with 43:11.6 and 100.0150 km/h (62.147 mph) average, and the Ferraris had to be driven hard. Gendebien/Hill were out already after lap 1 with a transmission problem that later affected also Gurney/Allison. All the big Ferraris retired due to mechanical problems, with the initial mechanical problem of the Jean Behra car being a crash with rollover that left Behra uninjured while the battered car was put back on the road by spectators. Behra made it to the pits where Tony Brooks declined to pilot the wreck. Being reminded of the terms in his contract, he drove it until the axle broke.

This left Porsche alone to command the race, taking the top four places despite the loss of the two main S2.0 Porsche 718 RSK cars driven by F1 pilots. The leading Porsche 718 of Jo Bonnier and Wolfgang von Trips was forced to withdraw on the last lap, leaving victory to the supporting S1.5 718 RSK driven by lesser known Germans, with three other Porsche completing a 1-2-3-4 triumph for Zuffenhausen.

== Championship and Legacy ==
As the 1956 Targa was not part of the 1956 World Sportscar Championship, due to 1955 being a one-off replacement for the cancelled Carrera Panamericana and the Mille Miglia being the Italian round until cancelled after 1957, it was the 1959 Targa that saw the first Porsche win in the World Sportscar Championship, with the pairing of Edgar Barth/Seidel. They took an impressive victory, with their Porsche 718 RSK completing 14 laps, covering 626.343 miles in just over 11 hours of racing, averaging a speed of 56.737 mph. Second place went to Stuttgart locals Eberhard Mahle, Paul-Ernst Strähle and Herbert Linge in an older private works-supported Porsche 550 RS, albeit 20 mins adrift. The podium was completed by another works Porsche, this time a GT-class 356A Carrera of Antonio Pucci and Huschke von Hanstein who were further 9 mins behind, the first GT car to finish. Surprisingly, the fourth car home, a private works-supported 356 further 4+ minutes behind, was driven by the same three-man crew that finished second.

After finishing 3rd in the 1959 12 Hours of Sebring, the Targa result meant Porsche took the lead in the 1959 World Sportscar Championship standing, with 12 points, over 8 for Sebring-winner Ferrari. This was the first time Ferrari had not topped the standings since March 1957. After a 2nd place at the 1959 RAC Tourist Trophy in a season in which only the best 3 of 5 results were counted, Porsche was tied in points with Ferrari despite running only half the engine size, and not 12 but only 4 cylinders.

== Official Classification ==
Class Winners are in Bold text. All cars had to complete the full distance of 14 laps of 72km each for 1008km in total.

Pos	No	Class	Driver		Entrant	Chassis	Time	Reason Out
1	**112**	**S1.5**	(West Germany) **Edgar Barth**	(West Germany) **Wolfgang Seidel**	**Porsche KG**	**Porsche 718 RSK**	**11hr 02:21.8, 14**	
2	118	S1.5	(West Germany) Eberhard Mahle (West Germany) Herbert Linge	(West Germany) Paul Ernst Strähle	Porsche KG	Porsche 550 RS	11hr 22:20.8, 14	
3	**102**	**GT2.6**	(West Germany) **Huschke von Hanstein**	(Italy) **Antonio Pucci**	**Porsche KG**	**Porsche 356A Carrera**	**11hr 31:44.4, 14**	
4	96	GT2.6	(West Germany) Paul Ernst Strähle (West Germany) Eberhard Mahle	(West Germany) Herbert Linge	Porsche KG	Porsche 356A Carrera	11hr 36:10.0, 14	
5	**134**	**S2.0**	(Italy) **Mennato Boffa**	(Italy) **Piero Drogo**	**Centro-Sud**	**Maserati A6GCS/53**	**11hr 41:20.0, 14**	
6	**38**	**GT1.3**	(Italy) **“Dario Sepe”** (Italy) **Mario Sannino**	(United Kingdom) **Colin Davis**	**Scuderia Sant’Ambroeus**	**Alfa Romeo Giuletta Sprint Veloce Zagato**	**12hr 02:30.0, 14**	
7	**84**	**S1.1**	(Italy) **Umberto Bini**	(Italy) **Luciano Mantovani**	**Scuderia Sant’Ambroeus**	**Osca S1100**	**12hr 10:52.3, 14**	
8	132	S2.0	(Italy) Mario Cammarata	(Italy) Domenico Tramontana	Mario Cammarata	Ferrari 500 TRC	12hr 14:45.4, 14	
9	**120**	**GT2.6+**	(Italy) **Salvatore La Pira**	(Italy) **Francesco Siracusa**	**Nissena**	**Ferrari 250 GT LWB Berlinetta**	**12hr 24:15.0, 14**	
10	138	S2.0	(Italy) Giuseppe Allotta	(Italy) Nino Vaccarella	Giuseppe Allotta	Maserati A6 GCS	12hr 35:47.4, 14	
11	72	S1.1	(Italy) Domenico Rotolo	(Italy) Gaspere Cavaliere	Monte Pellegrino	Osca MT4 1100	12hr 39:40.0	
12	30	GT1.3	(Italy) Antonio Picone (Italy) Sergio Mantia	(Italy) Franco Tagliavia	Monte Pellegrino	Alfa Romeo Giuletta Spider	12hr 41:31.0, 14	
13	46	GT1.3	(Italy) Vito Coco	(Italy) Vito Sabbia	Nissena	Alfa Romeo Giuletta Sprint Veloce	12hr 46.16.0, 14	
14	**8**	**GT750**	(Italy) **Enrico Carini**	(Italy) **Ernesto Prinoth**	**Janua**	**Fiat-Abarth 750 Zagato**	**12hr 53:39.0. 14**	
15	24	GT1.3	(Italy) Amedeo Bartoccelli (Italy) Salvatore Panepinto	(Italy) Giuseppe Parla	Nissena	Fiat 1200 Boano	13hr 00:27.0, 14	
16	20	GT1.3	(Italy) Pietor Laureati	(Italy) “Pompei””	Pietro Laureati	**Alfa Romeo Giuletta Spider Veloce**	**162**	
17	**50**	**S750**	(Italy) **Sesto Leonardi**	(Italy) **Alfredo Tinazzo**	**Settecoli**	**Osca S750**	**13hr 13:46.1, 14**	
18	70	S1.1	(United Kingdom) Tommy Wisdom	(France) Bernard Cahier	Tommy Wisdom	Austin-Healey Sprite	13hr 22:05.0, 14	
19	60	S750	(Italy) Gustavo Laureati	(Italy) Giuseppe Celani	Montegrappa	Osca S750	13hr 22:05.4, 14	
20	56	S750	(Italy) Giancarlo Rigamonti	(Italy) Anna Maria Peduzzi	Scuderia Sant Ambroeus	Osca S750	13hr 39:23.2, 14	
21	28	GT1.3	(France) José Rosinski	(France) Claude Bobrowski	Paris	Alfa Romeo Giuletta Sprint Veloce Zagato	13hr 44:11.4, 14	
NC	76	S1.1	(Italy) Enrico Manzini	(Italy) Attilio Brandi	Clemente Biondetti	Ermini-Fiat 1100	14:18:59	Over time limit
NC	6	GT750	(Italy) Carmelo Giugno	(Italy) Salvatore Giuffrida	Nissena	Fiat 500	14 ...	Over time limit
NC	92	GT2.6	(Italy) Giovanni Giordano	(Italy) Carlo Fulci	San Rizzo	Fiat 8V Zagato	14	Over time limit
DNF	136	S2.0	(Italy) Umberto Maglioli	(West Germany) Hans Herrmann	Porsche KG	Porsche 718 RSK		Transmission
DNF	150	S3.0	(France) Jean Behra	(United Kingdom) Tony Brooks	Scuderia Ferrari	Ferrari 250 TR 59		Rear axle
DNF	154	S3.0	(United States) Dan Gurney	(United Kingdom) Cliff Allison	Scuderia Ferrari	Ferrari 250 TR 59		Transmission
DNF	4	GT750	(France) Gérard Laureau	(France) François Jaeger	Automobiles Deutsch et Bonnet	D.B.-Panhard HBR4		did not finish
DNF	26	GT1.3	(Italy) Teodoro Zeccoli	(Italy) Roberto Rosignoli	G.S. Savio	Alfa Romeo Giuletta Sprint Veloce		did not finish
DNF	32	GT1.3	(Italy) Giuseppe Ruggero	(Italy) Ciro Monaci	Giuseppe Riggero	Alfa Romeo Giuletta Sprint Veloce Zagato		did not finish
DNF	34	GT1.3	(France) Jean-Pierre Hanrioud	(France) Beniatt	Jean-Pierre Hanrioud	D.B.-Panhard HBR5		did not finish
DNF	36	GT1.3	(Italy) Sergio Bettoja	(Italy) P. Feroldi	Camidoglio	Alfa Romeo Giuletta Sprint Veloce Zagato		did not finish
DNF	40	GT1.3	(Italy) Ada Pace	(Italy) Carlo Peroglio	Racing Club 19	Alfa Romeo Giuletta Sprint Veloce Zagato		did not finish
DNF	42	GT1.3	(Italy) Enrico Giaccone	(Italy) Vincenzo Ribaudo	Enrico Giaccone	Alfa Romeo Giuletta Sprint Veloce		did not finish
DNF	44	GT1.3	(Italy) Francesco de Leonibus	(Italy) Carlo Peroglio	Racing Club 19	Alfa Romeo Giuletta Sprint Veloce Zagato		did not finish
DNF	52	S750	(Italy) Amerigo Brachetti	(Italy) Elio Pandolfo	Montegrappa	Giaur 750 Sport		did not finish
DNF	58	S750	(Italy) Giacomo Marino	(Italy) Salvatore Sirchia	Monte Pellegrino	Fiat-Abarth 750 Zagato		did not finish
DNF	74	S1.1	(Italy) Francesco La Mattina (Italy) Francesco Soldana	(Italy) Armando dols Soldana	Monte Pellegrino	Osca MT4 1100		did not finish
DNF	78	S1.1	(Italy) Emanuele Trapani	(Italy) Bartolomeo Donato	Monte Pellegrino	Osca MT4 1100		did not finish
DNF	80	S1.1	(Italy) Antonio di Salvo	(Italy) Silvestre Semilia	Falanga	Roar-Fiat 1100 Special		did not finish
DNF	82	S1.1	(Italy) Enzo Buzzetti	(Italy) Giuseppe Rossi	Settecoli	Osca MT4 1100		did not finish
DNF	90	GT2.6	(Italy) Rosario Montalbano	(Italy) Gaspare Bologna	Giuseppe Bologna	Fiat 8V		did not finish
DNF	94	GT2.6	(Italy) Alfonso Vella	(Italy) Pietro Tremini	Pietro Tremini	Fiat 8V		did not finish
DNF	100	GT2.6	(Italy) Rocco Finocchiaro	(Italy) Ignazio Consiglio	Rocco Finocchiaro	Fiat 8V		did not finish
DNF	104	GT2.6	(Italy) Vincenzo Sorrentino	(Italy) Franco Pisano	Sorrentino	Lancia Flaminia		did not finish
DNF	114	S1.5	(Italy) Edoardo Lualdi	(Italy) Ludovico Scarfiotti	Scuderia Sant Ambroeus	Osca MT4 1500		did not finish
DNF	116	S1.5	(Belgium) Christian Goethals		Christian Goethals	Porsche 550 RS		did not finish
DNF	122	GT2.6+	(Italy) Nino Todaro	(Italy) Gennaro Alterio	Mediterranea	Ferrari 250 GT		did not finish
DNF	140	S2.0	(Italy) Gaetano Starrabba	(Italy) Domenico Lo Coco	Gaetano Starrabba	Ferrari 500 TRC		did not finish
DNF	142	S2.0	(Italy) Giulio Cabianca	(Italy) Giorgio Scarlatti	Scuderia Eugenio Castellotti	Dino 196 S		Out of fuel
DNF	130	S2.0	(Sweden) Jo Bonnier	(West Germany) Wolfgang von Trips	Porsche KG	Porsche 718 RSK	13	did not finish
DNF	152	S3.0	(Belgium) Olivier Gendebien	(United States) Phil Hill	Scuderia Ferrari	Ferrari 250 TR 59	1	Pinion
DNS	2	GT750	(Italy) Elio Lenza	(Italy) Filippo Golia	Elio Lenza	Fiat-Abarth 750 Zagato		did not start
DNS	10	GT750	(Italy) Aldo Tine (Italy) Matteo Sgarlata	(Italy) Gianni Carpinteri	Aretusa	Fiat-Abarth 750		did not start
DNS	22	GT1.3	(Italy) Francesco Gambi		Francesco Gambi	Alfa Romeo Giuletta Spider Veloce		did not start
DNS	54	S750	(Italy) Gaetano Spampinato		Spampinato	Fiat-Abarth 750 Sport		did not start
DNS	98	GT2.6	(Italy) Sergio Mantia	(Italy) Giovanni Napoli	Monte Pellegrino	Lancia Aurelia B24		did not start
DNS	110	S1.5	(France) Henri Perrier (France) Gilled Nebon Carle	(France) Binachon	Henri Perrier / Binachon	Osca MT4 1500		did not start

- Fastest Lap: Jo Bonnier, 43:01.6secs 100.0150 km/h (62.147 mph)

=== Class Winners ===
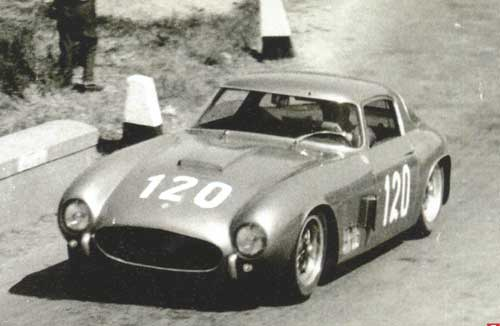
The Ferrari 250 GT of La Pira and Siracusa during the race. Winner of the GT +2600 class.

Class	Winners		
Sports 3000	No finishers		
Sports 2000	134	Maserati A6GCS/53	Boffa / Drogo
Sports 1500	112	Porsche 718 RSK	Barth / Seidel
Sports 1100	84	Osca S1100	Bini / Mantovani
Sports 750	50	Osca S750	Leonardi / Tinazzo
Grand Touring +2600	120	Ferrari 250 GT LWB Berlinetta	La Pira / Siracusa
Grand Touring 2600	102	Porsche 356A Carrera	von Hanstein / Pucci
Grand Touring 1300	38	Alfa Romeo Giuletta Sprint Veloce Zagato	“Sepe” / Davis / Sannino
Grand Touring 750	8	Fiat-Abarth 750 Zagato	Carini / Prinoth

== Standings after the race ==
Pos	Championship	Points
1	(West Germany) Porsche	12
2	(Italy) Ferrari	8
3	(Italy) Maserati	2
4	(Italy) Alfa Romeo	1

- Note: Only the top five positions are included in this set of standings.

Championship points were awarded for the first six places in each race in the order of 8-6-4-3-2-1. Manufacturers were only awarded points for their highest finishing car with no points awarded for positions filled by additional cars. Only the best 3 results out of the 5 races could be retained by each manufacturer. Points earned but not counted towards the championship totals are listed within brackets in the above table.

World Sportscar Championship
Previous race: 12 Hours of Sebring	1959 season	Next race: 1000km Nürburgring
