= 1959 12 Hours of Sebring =

Sports car endurance race

Sebring International Raceway in 1952-1966

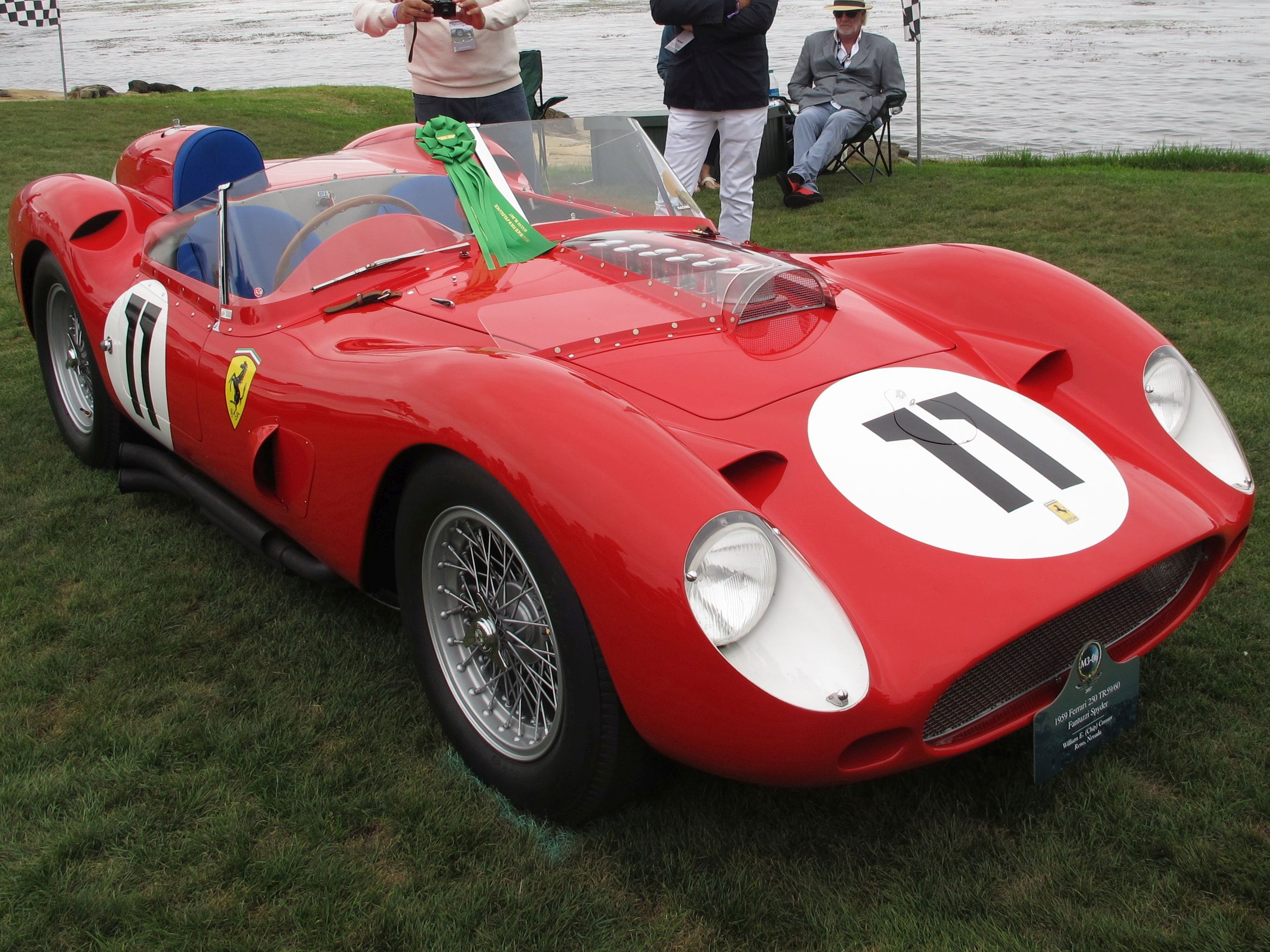
Ferrari 250TR

The 1959 12-Hour Florida International Grand Prix of Endurance for the Amoco Trophy was a motor race for sportscars, staged on 21 March at the Sebring International Raceway, Florida, United States. It was the opening round of the 1959 World Sportscar Championship and was the eighth running of the 12 Hours of Sebring.

The race was won by Dan Gurney, Phil Hill, Chuck Daigh and Olivier Gendebien driving a Ferrari 250 TR 59 for Scuderia Ferrari.

== Report ==
=== Entry ===
A massive total of 81 racing cars were registered for this event, of which 74 arrived for practice. Only these, 65 qualified for, and started the race. Reigning champions, Ferrari had eight of their new 250 TRs in Florida, of which three were works machines (1959 model) for their squad of drivers; Phil Hill, Dan Gurney, Chuck Daigh, Olivier Gendebien, Jean Behra and Cliff Allison. Their main opposition would come from a single works Aston Martin.

David Brown sent just one Aston Martin DBR1/300 over from England for Carroll Shelby and Roy Salvadori. Also on the entry list were some quick looking Lister-Jaguar entered by Briggs Cunningham with himself, Walt Hansgen and Stirling Moss amongst their squad. The work outfit also brought a car for Moss and paired him with Ivor Bueb.

=== Qualifying ===
Because there were no qualifying sessions to set the grid, the starting positions were decided according to engine size with the 3.0 litre Aston Martin DBR1 of Shelby and Salvadori being given first place.

=== Race ===
Most of the 40,000 spectators expected a battle for sole Aston Martin and the Ferrari. Although early on, there was a great scrap, the Aston retired after just 32 laps with gear lever problems. This meant it really was a Ferrari battle at the front of the field for almost all the race. The official result lists the winner as the no. 7 Ferrari of Gurney, Daigh, Hill and Gendebien, but that's not the whole story.

For the opening four and half hours, the Ferrari of Hill and Gendebien led until suffering from a broken differential. That put the Gurney/Daigh car in front. Behra/Allison were in second, followed by Moss/Bueb. And then the heavy rain arrived and the race became intriguing. With cars sliding off all over the place, one of the most dramatic accidents come just after the six-hour mark when Robert Rollason’s Stanguellini 750 Sport collided with a pole that supported a bridge. The car hit the pole while sideways throwing it up into the air before splitting in half, and ending up on its roof. It required a number of track marshals to flip it back onto its wheels, so that Rollason could escape uninjured.

The conditions made it difficult for even the very best to keep their cars under control. The works Lister-Jaguar with Moss behind the wheel, despite struggling for most of the race, came alive and moved up through the field passing both the Ferraris. After five hours, Moss led Behra and by now the little Porsche of Wolfgang von Trips and Jo Bonnier had moved into third. At this time, Scuderia Ferrari decided to call on the experience of Hill and Gendebien and added them the Gurney/Daigh car. Although the fans were not happy, this was a team event and Ferrari wanted to win. Then Moss was disqualified for illegal refuelling.

With the better drivers now driving the no.7, Hill passed Behra for the lead and the car held on to first place until the flag dropped. After 12 hours of racing, the Scuderia Ferrari of Gurney, Daigh, Hill and Gendebien won ahead of their team-mates Behra and Allison. Car number 7, took an impressive victory, completing 188 laps, covering 977.6 miles after 12 hours of racing, averaging a speed of 81.181mph. Second place went to the second Ferrari, albeit one lap adrift. The podium was complete by works Porsche of von Trips and Bonnier who were four laps behind the winners.

== Official Classification ==
Class Winners are in Bold text.

Pos	No	Class	Driver		Entrant	Chassis	Laps	Reason Out
1st	**7**	**S3.0**	(United States) **Dan Gurney** (United States) **Phil Hill**	(United States) **Chuck Daigh** (Belgium) **Olivier Gendebien**	**Scuderia Ferrari**	**Ferrari 250 TR 59**	**12hr 02:31.8, 188**	
2nd	9	S3.0	(France) Jean Behra	(United Kingdom) Cliff Allison	Scuderia Ferrari	Ferrari 250 TR 59	187	
3rd	**31**	**S2.0**	(West Germany) **Wolfgang von Trips**	(Sweden) **Jo Bonnier**	**Porsche Auto Co.**	**Porsche 718 RSK**	**184**	
4th	**34**	**S1.5**	(United States) **Bob Holbert**	(United States) **Don Sesslar**	**Cyrus L. Fulton**	**Porsche 718 RSK**	**182**	
5th	32	S1.5	(United States) John Fitch	(East Germany) Edgar Barth	Porsche Auto Co.	Porsche 718 RSK	181	
6th	12	S3.0	(United States) E.D. Martin	(United States) Lance Reventlow	Edwin D. Martin	Ferrari 250 TR 58	174	
7th	14	S3.0	(United States) Ed Lunken (Switzerland) Gaston Andrey	(United States) Augie Pabst	James Johnston	Ferrari 250 TR 58	174	
8th	35	S1.5	(United States) Jack McAfee	(United Kingdom) Ken Miles	Precision Motors	Porsche 718 RSK	173	
9th	**70**	**GT3.5**	(United States) **Howard Hively**	(United States) **Richie Ginther**	**Scuderia Ferrari**	**Ferrari 250 GT California**	**171**	
10th	37	S1.5	(United States) Ray “Ernie” Erickson	(United States) Ed Hugus	Chester J. Flynn	Porsche 7118 RSK	170	
11th	**33**	**GT1.6**	(West Germany) **Huschke von Hanstein**	(Netherlands) **Carel Godin de Beaufort**	**Porsche Auto Co.**	**Porsche 356A Carrera GT**	**164**	
12th	3	S3.0	(United States) Walt Hansgen	(United States) Dick Thompson	B.S. Cunningham	Lister-Jaguar	164	
13th	19T	S2.0	(United States) Lloyd Casner (United States) Dan Collins	(United States) Jim Hunt	North American Racing Team	Ferrari 500 TRC	164	
14th	**25**	**GT2.0**	(United States) **Bobby Burns** (United States) **James Cook**	(United States) **Roy Jackson-Moore**	**A.C. Cars, Ltd.**	**AC Ace**	**164**	
15th	4	S3.0	(United States) Briggs Cunningham (United States) Russ Boss	(United States) Lake Underwood (United Kingdom) Stirling Moss	B.S. Cunningham	Lister-Jaguar	164	
16th	**44**	**GT1.3**	(United States) **Jake Kaplan**	(United States) **Charlie Rainville**	**Jake Kaplan**	**Alfa Romeo Giuletta Spider Veloce**	**162**	
17th	**59**	**S750**	(France) **Gérard Laureau**	(France) **Paul Armagnac**	**Deutsch & Bonnet**	**DB-Panhard HBR4**	**162**	
18th	60	S750	(Argentina) Alejandro de Tomaso (United States) Isabel Haskell	(United States) Denise McCluggage (Mexico) Ricardo Rodríguez	Alejandro de Tomaso	Osca S750	161	
19th	**48**	**S1.1**	(United States) **Frank Baptista** (United States) **Art Tweedale**	(United States) **Charles Wallace**	**Elva Engineering Co.**	**Elva-Climax Mk IV**	**160**	
20th	15	GT3.5	(Cuba) Alfonso Gomez-Mena	(Cuba) Juan Montalvo	Auto Sport Club, Havana	Ferrari 250 GT LWB	160	
21st	45	GT1.3	(United States) Pete Lovely (United States) Sam Weiss	(United States) Jay Chamberlain	Team Lotus	Lotus Elite	160	
22nd	24	GT2.0	(United States) Arch Means (United States) Ross Wees	(United States) Charles Kurtz	A. C. Car Ltd	AC Ace	159	
23rd	49	S1.1	(United States) Burdette Martin (United States) Chuck Dietrich	(United States) William Jordan	Elva Engineering Co.	Elva-Climax Mk IV	158	
24th	23T	GT2.0	(United States) Lonnie Rix	(United States) Ed Rahal	A. C. Car Ltd	AC Ace	158	
25th	26	GT2.0	(United States) Max Goldman (United States) Sydney H. Arnolt	(United States) Ralph Durbin	S. H. Arnolt	Arnolt Boldie	155	
26th	22	GT2.0	(United States) Mike Rothschild	(United States) Arch McNeill	Fergus Motors (Morgan M.)	Morgan Plus 4	155	
27th	28	GT1.6	(United States) Ray Saidel	(United States) Gus Ehrman	Hambro Auto Corp.	MG A Twin Cam	155	
28th	**64**	**GT750**	(United States) **Bill Rutan** (United States) **Paul Richards**	(United States) **Ray Cuomo**	**Roosevelt Auto Co. Inc.**	**Fiat-Abarth 750 Record Monza**	**152**	
29th	62	GT750	(Italy) Lanzo Cussini	(Italy) Remo Cattini	Roosevelt Auto Co. Inc.	Fiat-Abarth 750 Record Monza	150	
30th	65	GT750	(United States) Bob Kuhn	(United States) Jim Jeffords	George F. Schrafft	Fiat-Abarth 750 Record Monza	149	
31st	**54**	**GT1.0**	(United States) **Phil Stiles**	(Canada) **Hugh Sutherland**	**Hambro Auto Corp.**	**Austin-Healey Sebring Sprite**	**149**	
32nd	63	GT750	(Italy) Mario Poltonieri	(Italy) Alfonso Thiele	Roosevelt Auto Co. Inc.	Fiat-Abarth 750 Record Monza	147	
33rd	40	S1.5	(United States) Charles Moran, Jr.	(United States) George Rand	Charles Moran, Jr.	Lotus-Climax Eleven	145	
34th	29	GT1.6	(United Kingdom) John Dalton	(United States) Jim Parkinson	Hambro Auto Corp.	MG A Twin Cam	145	
35th	51	GT1.3	(United States) Harry Blanchard	(United States) Skip Callanan	Harry C. Blanchard	Lancia Appia Zagato	144	
36th	53	GT1.0	(United States) Ed Leavens	(United States) Harold Kunz	Hambro Auto Corp.	Austin-Healey Sebring Sprite	142	
37th	58	S750	(France) Henri Perrier	(United States) Bill Wood	Deutsch & Bonnet	DB-Panhard HBR4	141	
38th	55	GT1.0	(Canada) Fred Hayes (United States) John Colgate	(United States) John Christy	Hambro Auto Corp.	Austin-Healey Sebring Sprite	141	
39th	43	GT1.3	(United States) Bob Pfaff (United States) Wynn Kramarsky	(United States) Louis Comito (United States) Tom O'Brien	Louis Comito	Alfa Romeo Giuletta Veloce	140	
40th	52	GT1.3	(Switzerland) Peter Baumberger (United States) Walter Cronkite	(United States) Warren Rohlfs	Charles Kreisler	Lancia Appia Zagato	140	
41st	18	S2.0	(United States) Jim Hall	(United States) Hap Sharp	Carroll Shelby Sports Cars	Maserati 250S	138	
42nd	42	GT1.3	(United States) Bob Rubin (United States) Louis Comito	(United States) Bob Grossman	Robert Grossman	Alfa Romeo Giuletta Veloce	134	
DNF	10	S3.0	(United States) Rod Carveth	(United States) Gilbert Geitner	North American Racing Team	Ferrari 250 TR 58	130	Collision
DNF	21	GT2.0	(United States) Charles Kolb (United States) Gene Hobbs	(United States) Fred Moore	Standard Triumph Motor Co.	Triumph TR3	128	Valve
NC	80	GT1.0	(United States) Fred Lieb	(United States) Smokey Drolet	Turner Sports Cars, Ltd.	Turner 750 Sport	128	
DNF	27	S2.0	(Canada) Harry Entwistle	(Canada) Bob Hanna	Autosport, Ltd.	Lotus-Climax 15	126	Electrics
NC	47	S1.1	(United States) Tom Fleming (United States) Harry Dager	(United States) Bill Schade	Team Lotus	Lotus-Climax Eleven	123	
NC	30	GT1.6	(United States) Ray Pickering (United States) Sherman Decker	(United States) Jack Flaherty	Hambro Auto Corp.	MG A Twin Cam	121	
DNF	38	S1.5	(United States) Carl Haas (United States) Jay Middleton	(United States) Frank Campbell	Automobile OSCA	Osca S1500	115	Wet ignition
NC	16	GT3.5	(United States) George Reed (United States) George Arents	(United States) Don O'Dell	RRR Enterprises	Ferrari 250 GT LWB	110	
NC	56	S1.1	(Mexico) Ricardo Rodríguez	(United States) Frank Bott	Automobile OSCA	Osca S950	106	
DISQ	2	S3.0	(United Kingdom) Ivor Bueb	(United Kingdom) Stirling Moss	The Lister Corp.	Lister-Jaguar	98	Illegal refuelling
NC	20	GT2.0	(United States) Robert Samm (United States) Fred Moore	(United States) John Bentley	Standard Triumph Motor Co.	Triumph TR3	98	
DNF	66	S750	(United States) Robert Rollason	(United States) Sandy MacArthur	Sandy MacArthur	Stanguelliin S750 Bialbero	97	Accident
DNF	57	GT1.0	(United States) Howard Hanna	(United States) Richard Toland	Deutsch & Bonnet	DB-Panhard HBR4	82	Engine
DNF	61	S750	(United States) Alan Markelson	(United States) Rees Makins	Automobile OSCA	Osca S750	82	Electrics
DNF	8	S3.0	(Belgium) Olivier Gendebien	(United States) Phil Hill	Scuderia Ferrari	Ferrari 250 TR 59	77	Differential
DNF	11	S3.0	(Mexico) Pedro Rodríguez	(United States) Paul O'Shea	Mexican National Auto Club	Ferrari 250 TR 58	66	Engine
DNF	46	GT1.3	(United States) Jay Chamberlain	(United States) Sam Weiss	Team Lotus	Lotus Elite	65	Engine
DNF	36	S1.5	(Argentina) Roberto Mieres (Argentina) Pedro von Döry	(Argentina) Anton von Döry	Count von Döry	Porsche 718 RSK	34	Camshaft
DNF	50	S1.1	(United States) M.R.J. Wyllie (United States) Margaret Wyllie	(United States) Skip Lange	M.R.J. Wyllie	Elva-Climax Mk. IV	34	Suspension
DNF	1	S3.0	(United Kingdom) Roy Salvadori	(United States) Carroll Shelby	David Brown-Aston Martin	Aston Martin DBR1/300	32	Gear lever
DNF	41	GT1.3	(Mexico) Fred van Beuren (Mexico) Mario Mercader	(Mexico) Javier Velásquez	Fred T. van Beuren	Alfa Romeo Giuletta Veloce	31	Accident
DNF	39	S1.5	(France) Jean Lucas	(France) Jean-François Malle	Los Amigos	Cooper-Climax Monaco T49	20	Oil loss
DNF	17	GT3.5	(United States) Duncan Forlong (United States) David Schiff	(United States) Joe Sheppard	Joe Sheppard-David Schiff	Aston Martin DB2/4	11	Piston
DNS	5	S3.0	(United States) Ed Lawrence (United States) Ralph Durbin	(United States) James Cook	Rallye Motors	Maserati 300S		Fatal accident (Lawrence)
DNS	19	S3.0	(United States) Lloyd Casner	(United States) Jim Hunt	North American Racing Team	Ferrari 250 TR		
DNS	23	GT2.0	(United States) Lonnie Rix (United States) George Avent	(United States) Ed Rahal	A. C. Car Ltd	AC Ace		practiced only (Road accident)

- Fastest Lap: Jean Behra, 3:21.6secs (92.857 mph)

=== Class Winners ===
Class	Winners		
Sports 3000 – Class D	7	Ferrari 250 TR 59	Gurney / Daigh / Hill / Gendebien
Sports 2000 – Class E	31	Porsche 718 RSK	von Trips / Bonnier
Sports 1500 – Class F	34	Porsche 718 RSK	Holbert / Sessiar
Sports 1100 – Class G	48	Elva-Climax Mk IV	Baptista / Wallace / Tweedale
Sports 750 – Class H	59	D.B.-Panhard HBR4	Laureau / Armagnac
Grand Touring 3500 – Class 9	70	Ferrari 250 GT California Spyder	Hively / Ginther
Grand Touring 2000 – Class 7	25	AC Ace	Burns / Jackson-Moore / Cook
Grand Touring 1600 – Class 6	33	Porsche 356A Carrera GT	von Hanstein / de Beaufort
Grand Touring 1300 – Class 5	44	Alfa Romeo Giuletta Spider Veloce	Kaplan / Rainville
Grand Touring 1000 – Class 4	54	Austin-Healey Sebring Sprite	Stiles / Sutherland
Grand Touring 750 – Class 3	64	Fiat-Abarth 750 Record Monza	Rutan / Cuomo / Richards

== Standings after the race ==
Pos	Championship	Points
1	(Italy) Ferrari	8
2	(West Germany) Porsche	4

- Note: Only the top five positions are included in this set of standings.

Championship points were awarded for the first six places in each race in the order of 8-6-4-3-2-1. Manufacturers were only awarded points for their highest finishing car with no points awarded for positions filled by additional cars. Only the best 3 results out of the 5 races could be retained by each manufacturer. Points earned but not counted towards the championship totals are listed within brackets in the above table.

World Sportscar Championship
Previous race: 1958 RAC Tourist Trophy	1959 season	Next race: Targa Florio
