= 1959 World Sportscar Championship =

Racing tournament

Seasons
- ← 1958 1960 →

The 1959 World Sportscar Championship was the seventh FIA World Sportscar Championship. It was a series for sportscars that ran in many worldwide endurance events. It ran from 21 March 1959 to 5 September 1959, and comprised five races, following the 1000 km Buenos Aires being removed from the calendar, although the race did return in 1960.

The championship was won by Aston Martin.

== Season ==
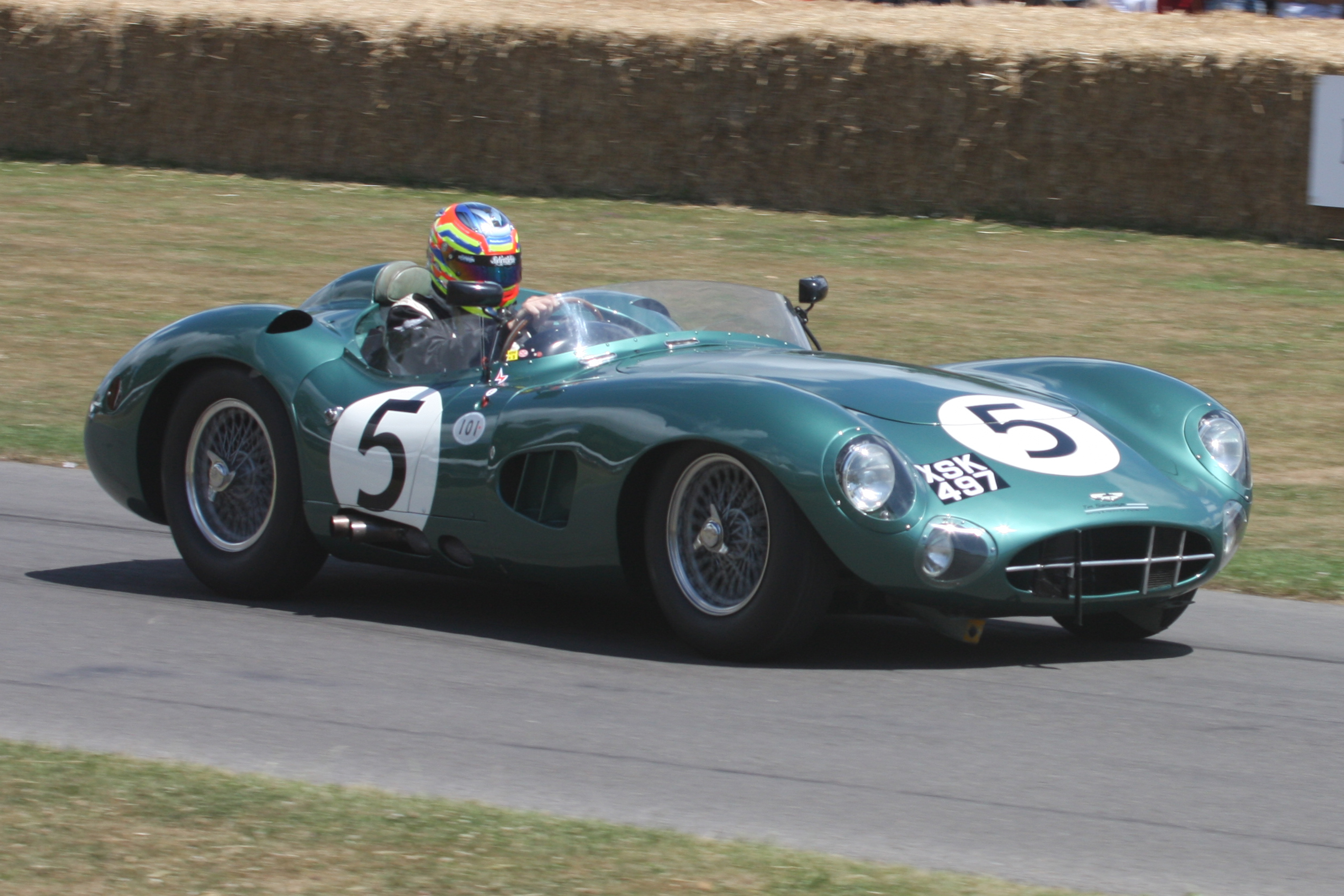
Aston Martin won the championship with its DBR1/300 model (similar to the 1957 DBR1 pictured above)

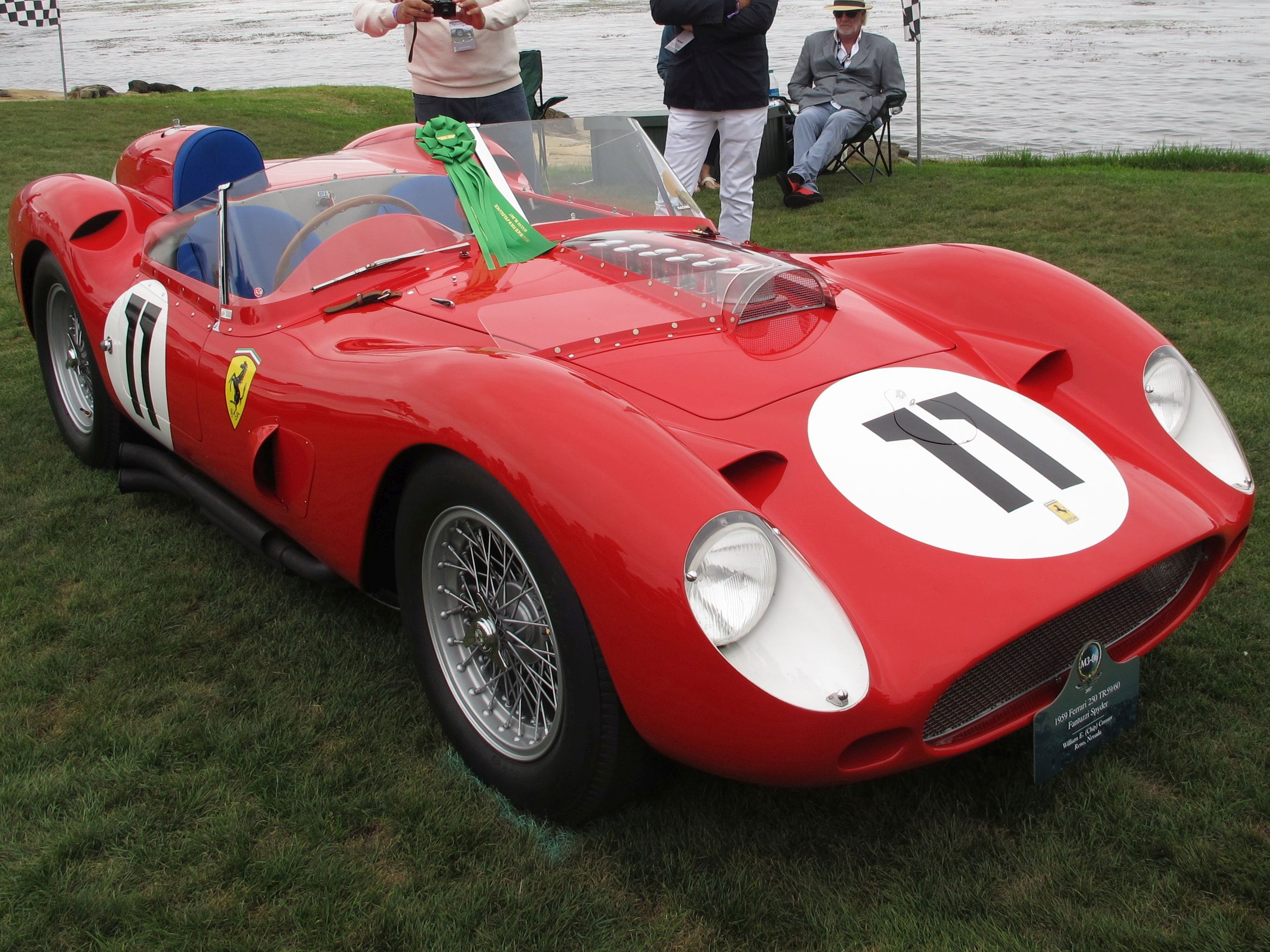
Ferrari placed second with the 250 TR (pictured) and 250 GT models

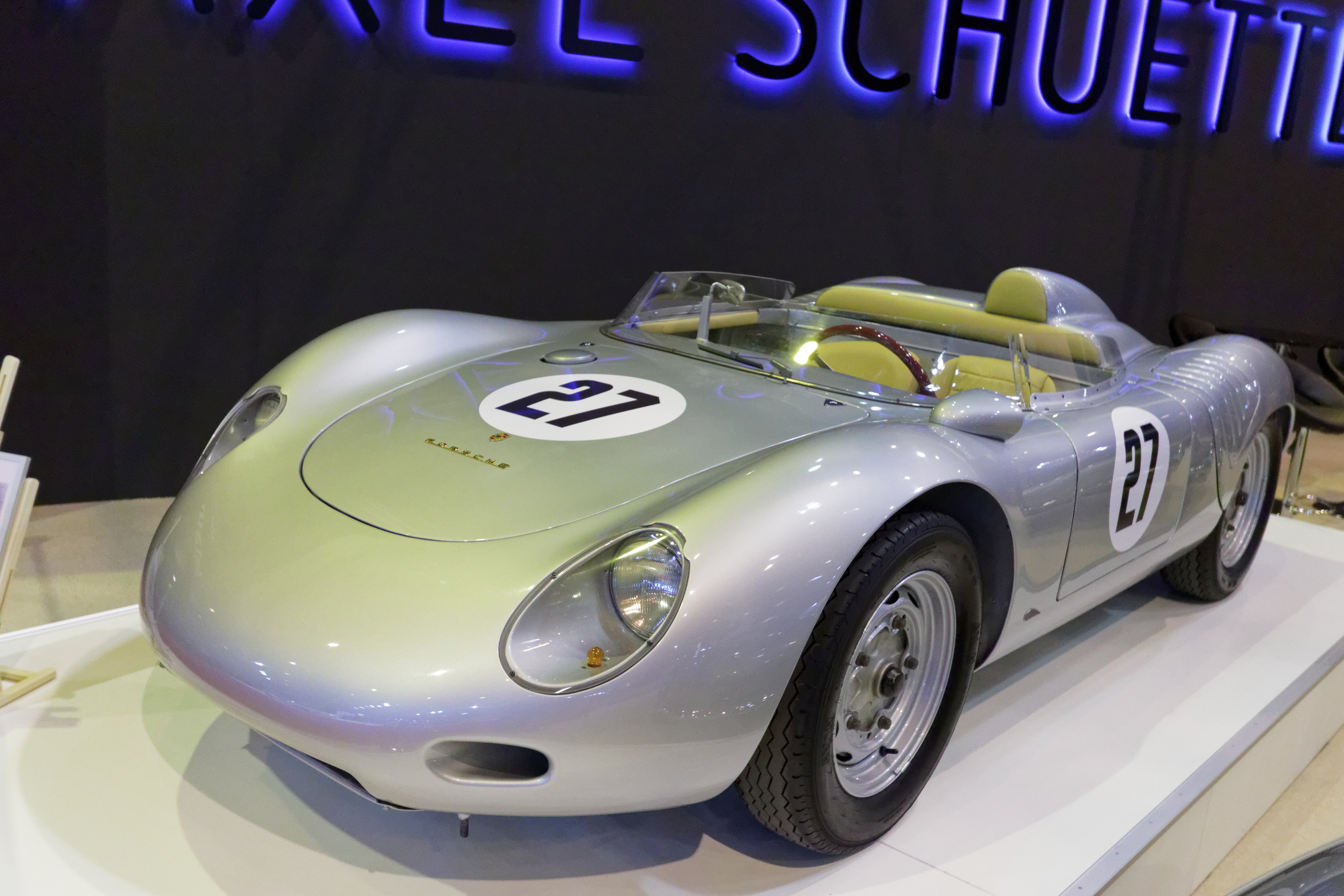
Porsche placed third with its 718 RSK

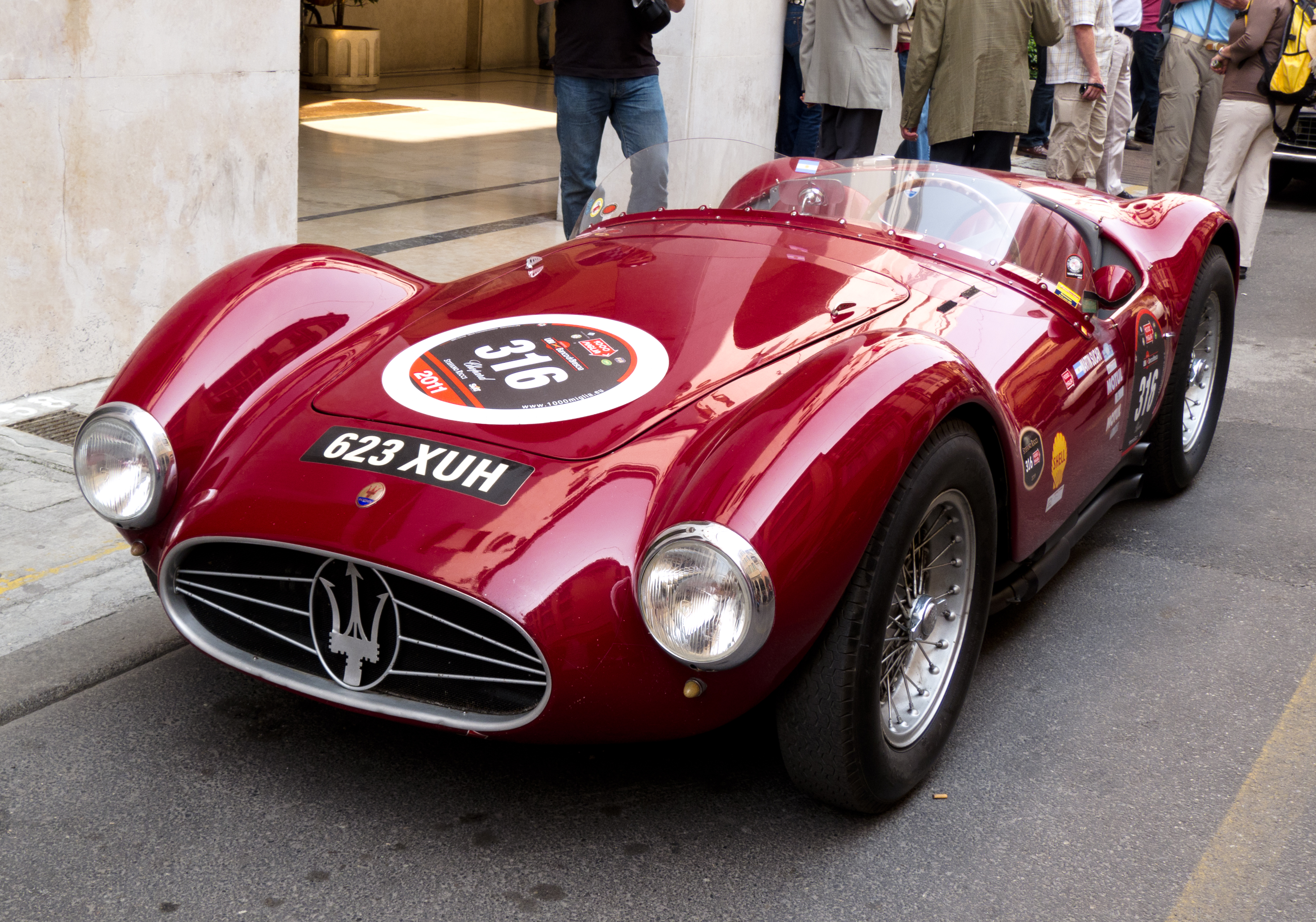
Maserati placed fourth with its Maserati A6GCS

The championship comprised five qualifying rounds; the 12 Hours of Sebring, the Targa Florio run over 1000 km, the Nürburgring 1000 km, the 24 Hours of Le Mans, and the RAC Tourist Trophy run over 6 hours.

At the Sebring 12 Hours in Florida, the Scuderia Ferrari scored a 1–2 with Porsche filling the next three places. Aston Martin sent a single DBR1, as a favour to the organisers, in the hands of Salvadori and Shelby but it retired early in the race. Porsche dominated the Targa Florio winning with the little Porsche 718 RSK whilst 2-3-4 places were filled by other Porsche models. Meanwhile, the works Ferraris all retired. Aston Martin missed the event as back in England, David Brown of Aston Martin had initially ruled against a World Championship challenge, on financial grounds. But, Stirling Moss wangled one DBR1/300 works car to win the Nürburgring 1000 km, with Jack Fairman beating the Hill/Gendebien Ferrari by over 40 seconds with the best placed Porsche in fourth. At Le Mans, the Astons of Roy Salvadori/Carroll Shelby and Maurice Trintignant/Paul Frère finished one-two!. The works Ferrari Testa Rossas all retired as did the works Porsches leaving privately entered Ferrari 250GTs to complete the minor placings. So David Brown's company simply had to field a full three-car team in what had become the title-deciding race, the RAC Tourist Trophy. Despite setting fire to their race leading car during a schedule refuelling stop, the sister car of Shelby/Fairman/Moss took victory and saw Aston Martin become the first British manufacturer ever to win the FIA World Sportscar Championship.

== Season results ==
=== Results ===
Round	Date	Event	Circuit or Location	Winning driver	Winning team	Winning car	Results
1	March 21	(United States) 12-Hour Florida International Grand Prix of Endurance for the Amoco Trophy	Sebring International Raceway	(United States) Dan Gurney (United States) Chuck Daigh (United States) Phil Hill (Belgium) Olivier Gendebien	(Italy) Scuderia Ferrari	(Italy) Ferrari 250 TR 59	Results
2	May 24	(Italy) 43° Targa Florio	Circuito Piccolo delle Madonie	(West Germany) Edgar Barth (West Germany) Wolfgang Seidel	(West Germany) Porsche KG	(West Germany) Porsche 718 RSK	Results
3	June 7	(West Germany) ADAC 1000 Kilometre Rennen Nürburgring	Nürburgring	(United Kingdom) Stirling Moss (United Kingdom) Jack Fairman	(United Kingdom) David Brown	(United Kingdom) Aston Martin DBR1/300	Results
4	June 20–21	(France) 24 Heures du Mans	Circuit de la Sarthe	(United Kingdom) Roy Salvadori (United States) Carroll Shelby	(United Kingdom) David Brown	(United Kingdom) Aston Martin DBR1/300	Results
5	September 5	(United Kingdom) News of the World sponsor the 24th R.A.C. Tourist Trophy	Goodwood Circuit	(United States) Carroll Shelby (United Kingdom) Jack Fairman (United Kingdom) Stirling Moss	(United Kingdom) David Brown	(United Kingdom) Aston Martin DBR1/300	Results

=== Championship ===
Note:

- Championship points were awarded for the first six places in each race in the order of 8-6-4-3-2-1.
- Manufacturers were awarded points only for their highest finishing car with no points awarded for positions filled by additional cars.
- Only the best 3 results out of the 5 races could be retained by each manufacturer. Points earned but not counted towards the championship totals are listed within brackets in the table below.

Pos	Manufacturer	(United States) SEB	(Italy) TGA	(West Germany) NÜR	(France) LMS	(United Kingdom) GWD	Total
1	(United Kingdom) Aston Martin			8	8	8	24
2^{†}	(Italy) Ferrari	8		6	4	(4)	18 (22)
3^{†}	(West Germany) Porsche	4	8	(3)		6	18 (21)
4	(Italy) Maserati		2				2
5=	(Italy) Alfa Romeo		1				1
5=	(United Kingdom) Lola					1	1

† - Ferrari declared second due to having the same number of wins, one, and second places, one, as Porsche but having two 3rd-place finishes to Porsche's one.

== The cars ==
The following models contributed to the net championship point scores of their respective manufacturers.

- Aston Martin DBR1/300
- Ferrari 250 TR 59 & Ferrari 250 GT Berlinetta LWB
- Porsche 718 RSK
- Maserati A6GCS/53
- Alfa Romeo Giuletta Sprint Veloce Zagato
- Lola Mk.1 Coventry Climax
