= Eberhard Mahle =

German racing driver (1933–2021)

- Born: 7 January 1933; Stuttgart, Württemberg, Germany
- Died: 21 December 2021 (aged 88)
- Occupation: Racing driver

Eberhard Mahle (7 January 1933 – 21 December 2021) was a German racing driver.

== Life and career ==
Mahle was born into a family of automobile assembly line workers, including his father, industrialist Ernst Mahle. He began racing in 1954 in the local Solituderennen and his career lasted until 1968. He finished second in the 1959 Targa Florio in a Porsche 550A. In 1966, he won the European Hill Climb Championship in the Sports Car category in a Porsche 911. After his retirement in 1968, he lived in Leonberg and devoted himself to the family business, Mahle GmbH.

He died on 21 December 2021, at the age of 88.

== Awards ==
- Silbernes Lorbeerblatt (1967)
