= 1959 RAC Tourist Trophy =

Motor race held at Goodwood Circuit, England

The 1959 RAC Tourist Trophy was contested on 5 September at the Goodwood Circuit, England. It was the fifth and final round of the 1959 World Sportscar Championship, and was the 24th RAC Tourist Trophy. The race was the title-decider in a three-way contest between Aston Martin, Ferrari and Porsche.

Goodwood Circuit

== Report ==
=== Entry ===
A grand total 31 racing cars were registered for this event, of which all 31 arrived for practice and qualifying. The entrant for championship leaders, Scuderia Ferrari, entered four cars for the event. Among their squad include Phil Hill, Tony Brooks and Olivier Gendebien, and they were placed in two cars, spreading the Italian marques options. As for David Brown’s Aston Martins, they had actually ruled against racing in the championship due to the cost, but with a chance of the title, entered three DBR1/300s for Stirling Moss/Roy Salvadori, Carroll Shelby/Jack Fairman and Maurice Trintignant/Paul Frère. The third manufacturer in the title race, Porsche, also brought three cars, led by Jo Bonnier and Wolfgang von Trips.

=== Qualifying ===
The Aston Martin DBR1/300 of Stirling Moss took pole position, averaging a speed of 94.737 mph around the 2.4 mile circuit.

=== Race ===
The race was run in typically Goodwood Indian summer sun, which saw Aston Martin triumph again, retain the Tourist Trophy, when the combination of Shelby/Fairman, joined late in the race by Moss brought their DBR1/300 home in first place, but Bonnier/von Trips were second for Porsche from Gendebien/Hill/Brooks/Cliff Allison.

This does not tell the full story for at Salvadori’s first fuel stop, the car caught fire during refuelling, destroying it along with the pit et al. Graham Whitehead sportingly withdrew his privately entered Aston Martin so that the David Brown’s work cars would have a home, and Moss was transferred to the Shelby/Fairman motor; as a result of this win Aston Martin became the 1959 World Champions.

The winning trio of Sheby/Fairman/Moss won in a time of 6hr 00:46.8 mins., averaging a speed of 89.406 mph. They covered a distance of 537.6 miles. One lap adrift was the Bonnier/van Trips’s Porsche, with the first Ferrari home also one lap behind.

== Official Classification ==
Class Winners are in Bold text.

| Pos | No | Class | Driver | | Entrant | Chassis | Laps | Reason Out |
|---|---|---|---|---|---|---|---|---|
| 1st | **2** | **S3.0** | (United States) **Carroll Shelby** (United Kingdom) **Stirling Moss** | (United Kingdom) **Jack Fairman** | **David Brown** | **Aston Martin DBR1/300** | **6hrs 00:46.8, 224** | |
| 2nd | **22** | **S2.0** | (West Germany) **Wolfgang von Trips** | (Sweden) **Jo Bonnier** | **Dr. Porsche** | **Porsche 718 RSK** | **223** | Chassis # 718-009 |
| 3rd | 10 | S3.0 | (Belgium) Olivier Gendebien (United Kingdom) Cliff Allison | (United States) Phil Hill (United Kingdom) Tony Brooks | Scuderia Ferrari | Ferrari 250 TR 59 | 223 | |
| 4th | 3 | S3.0 | (France) Maurice Trintignant | (Belgium) Paul Frère | David Brown | Aston Martin DBR1/300 | 221 | |
| 5th | 9 | S3.0 | (United Kingdom) Tony Brooks | (United States) Dan Gurney | Scuderia Ferrari | Ferrari 250 TR 59 | 220 | |
| 6th | **33** | **S1.1** | (United Kingdom) **Peter Ashdown** | (United States) **Alan Ross** | **Lola Cars** | **Lola-Climax Mk.1** | **210** | |
| 7th | 7 | S3.0 | (United Kingdom) Ron Flockhart | (United Kingdom) John Bekaert | Ecurie Ecosse | Jaguar D-Type | 209 | |
| 8th | 34 | S1.1 | (United Kingdom) Bob Hicks | (United Kingdom) Dick Prior | Lola Cars | Lola-Climax Mk.1 | 208 | |
| 9th | 36 | S1.1 | (United Kingdom) Mike McKee | (United Kingdom) J. Cedric Brierley | Elva Racing Team | Elva-Climax Mk V | 208 | |
| 10th | 35 | S1.1 | (United Kingdom) Bernard Cox | (United Kingdom) Colin Escott | Lola Cars | Lola-Climax Mk.1 | 202 | |
| 11th | 31 | S1.1 | (United Kingdom) Keith Greene | (United Kingdom) Tony Marsh | Team Lotus | Lotus-Climax 17 | 199 | |
| 12th | 23 | S2.0 | (East Germany) Edgar Barth | (Italy) Umberto Maglioli | Dr. Porsche | Porsche 718 RSK | 197 | |
| 13th | 38 | S1.1 | (United Kingdom) John Brown | (United Kingdom) Chris Steele | Elva Racing Team | Elva-Climax Mk IV | 171 | |
| 14th | 39 | S1.1 | (United Kingdom) John Campbell-Jones | (United Kingdom) John Horridge | John Campbell-Jones | Lotus-Climax Eleven | 154 | |
| DNF | 6 | S3.0 | (United Kingdom) Jim Clark | (United States) Masten Gregory | Ecurie Ecosse | Tojeiro-Jaguar | | Accident |
| DNF | 5 | S3.0 | (United Kingdom) John Dalton | (United Kingdom) David Shale | John Dalton | Aston Martin DB3S | | Gearbox |
| DNF | 29 | S2.0 | (United Kingdom) Graham Hill | (United Kingdom) Alan Stacey | Team Lotus | Lotus-Climax 15 | | Accident |
| DNF | 24 | S2.0 | (West Germany) Hans Herrmann | (United Kingdom) Chris Bristow | Dr. Porsche | Porsche 718 RSK | | Accident |
| DNF | 8 | S3.0 | (United Kingdom) Peter Blond | (United Kingdom) Jonathan Sieff | Taylor & Crawley | Lister-Jaguar | | Oil leak |
| DNF | 40 | S1.1 | (United Kingdom) Peter Arundell | (United Kingdom) Jack Westcott | Cranham Service Station | Lotus-Climax Eleven | | Accident |
| DNF | 4 | S3.0 | (United Kingdom) Graham Whitehead | (United Kingdom) Henry Taylor | A.G. Whitehead | Aston Martin DBR1/300 | | Withdrawn |
| DNF | 1 | S3.0 | (United Kingdom) Stirling Moss | (United Kingdom) Roy Salvadori | David Brown | Aston Martin DBR1/300 | | Pit fire |
| DNF | 21 | S2.0 | (Italy) Giorgio Scarlatti | (Italy) Ludovico Scarfiotti | Scuderia Ferrari | Dino 196 S | | Rear suspension |
| DNF | 27 | S2.0 | (United Kingdom) Tom Dickson | (United Kingdom) Jim Mackay | Dickson Motors | Lotus-Climax 15 | | Gearbox |
| DNF | 28 | S2.0 | (United Kingdom) David Piper | (United Kingdom) Bruce Halford | Dorchester Service Station | Lotus-Climax 15 | | Accident |
| DNF | 25 | S2.0 | (Australia) Jack Brabham | (New Zealand) Bruce McLaren | John Coombs Racing Organisation | Cooper-Climax Monaco T49 | | Steering arm |
| DNF | 32 | S1.1 | (United Kingdom) Innes Ireland | (United States) Jay Chamberlain | Team Lotus | Lotus-Climax 17 | | Axle |
| DNF | 37 | S1.1 | (United Kingdom) Chris Threlfall | (United Kingdom) Tom Threlfall | Elva Racing Team | Elva-Climax Mk V | | Camshaft |
| DNF | 26 | S2.0 | (United Kingdom) Mike Taylor | (United Kingdom) Christopher Martyn | Taylor & Crawley | Lotus-Climax 15 | | Head gasket |
| DNF | 11 | S3.0 | (United States) Phil Hill | (United Kingdom) Cliff Allison | Scuderia Ferrari | Ferrari 250 TR 59 | | Rocker |

- Fastest Lap: Stirling Moss, 1:31.2 secs (94.737 mph)

=== Class Winners ===
| Class | Winners | | |
|---|---|---|---|
| Sports 3000 | 2 | Aston Martin DBR1/300 | Shelby / Fairman / Moss |
| Sports 2000 | 22 | Porsche 718 RSK | von Trips / Bonnier |
| Sports 1100 | 33 | Lola-Climax Mk.1 | Ashdown / Ross |

== Standings after the race ==
| Pos | Championship | Points |
|---|---|---|
| 1 | (United Kingdom) Aston Martin | 24 |
| 2 | (Italy) Ferrari | 18 (22) |
| 3 | (West Germany) Porsche | 18 (21) |
| 4 | (Italy) Maserati | 2 |
| 5= | (Italy) Alfa Romeo | 1 |
| | (United Kingdom) Lola | 1 |

Championship points were awarded for the first six places in each race in the order of 8-6-4-3-2-1. Manufacturers were only awarded points for their highest finishing car with no points awarded for positions filled by additional cars. Only the best 3 results out of the 5 races could be retained by each manufacturer. Points earned but not counted towards the championship totals are listed within brackets in the above table.

World Sportscar Championship
| Previous race: 24 Hours of Le Mans | 1959 season | Next race: 1960 1000 km Buenos Aires |
