= Fiat-Abarth 750 =

The Fiat-Abarth 750 is a compact sporting series of automobiles manufactured by the Italian manufacturing firm Abarth & C. of Turin, Italy in the 1950s and 1960s. The cars used the floorpan and often the bodywork of the Fiat 600 but were fitted with Abarth's modified engines. Abarth also offered a number of bodyworks by other designers for the 750 and its derivatives, most famously Zagato but also Allemano and others.

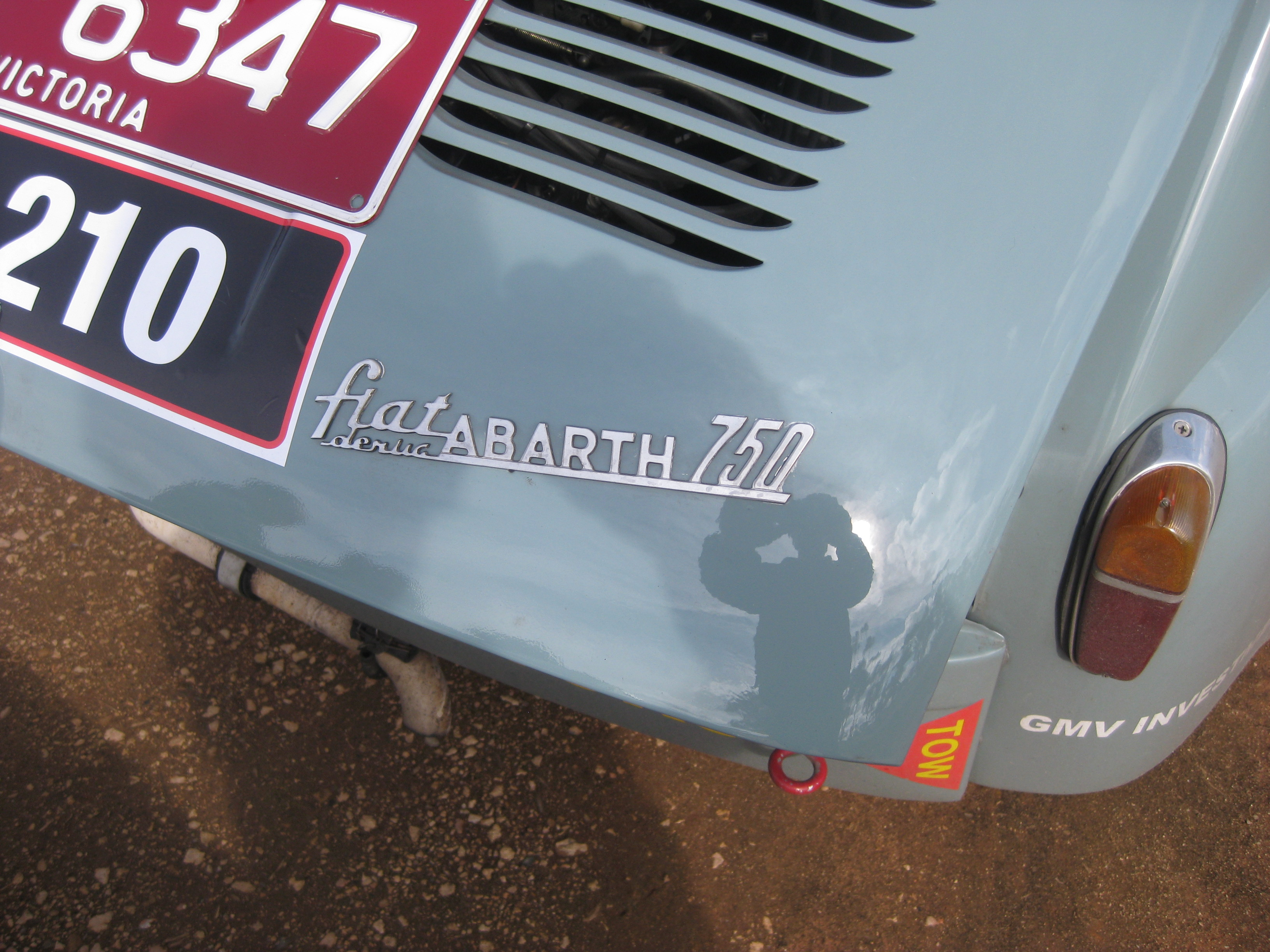
"Fiat Derivazione Abarth 750" logotype

There were also other derivatives, which were sold as the Fiat-Abarth 850, Fiat-Abarth 1000, and Abarth Monomille (1000 pushrod). For the 1960 Gran Turismo racing season the classes were changed to under 700 or under 1000 cc, while national competitions also featured an 850 cc class. Abarth responded with engines suitable for the new classes, although the 700 may have only been built in one or two examples. Depending on the state of tune, these then received additional letters to their names, such as TC or TCR. A twin-cam version, the "Bialbero", was also produced.

== Abarth 210 A Spyder ==
Abarth's first model based on the Fiat 600 was the 210 A Spyder, which first appeared in late 1955 - soon after the introduction of the 600 itself. Using the standard 600's bottom plate and a modified engine, its sleek bodywork was by Boano. It has a low-cut windscreen, vestigial rear fins, and a single centre-mounted headlight. The 633 cc (38.6 cu in) engine offers 32 CV (24 kW) while an enlarged 710 cc (43 cu in) 39 CV (29 kW) option was also available. Both engines have a 9.5:1 compression ratio, dual exhausts, and reach their max power at 6900 rpm. Wheelbase is 195 in (4,953.0 mm) and dry weight 409 kg (902 lb); top speed for the larger model was claimed to be 150 km/h (93 mph).

== Abarth 215 A Coupé & 216 A Spyder ==
In 1956 Abarth presented twin concept models, based on the Fiat 600 chassis and its 747 cc (45.6 cu in) engine. Both were designed by Franco Scaglione at Bertone. The Abarth 215 A Coupé was a closed variant presented at the Geneva Motor Show; the subsequent open-top spider had its first premiere in Turin. Both cars have large protruding tailfins and pop-up headlights.

== 750 ==
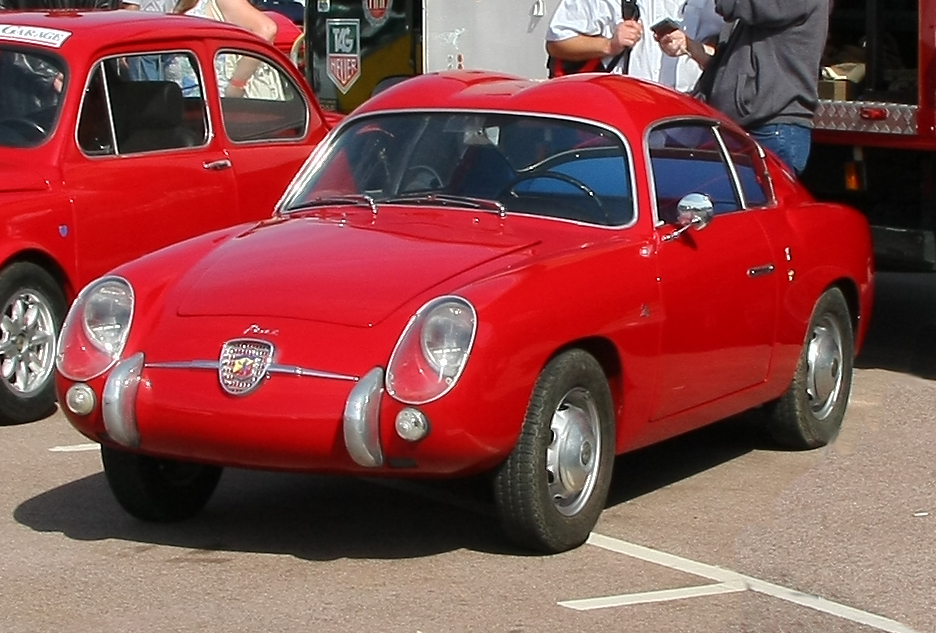
Fiat-Abarth 750 Zagato " Double Bubble"

Abarth offered their 750 cc derivative of the Fiat 600 both with the original ("Berlina") bodywork and with more slippery bodywork from others. Most famous is the aerodynamic Zagato-bodied range of Abarth 750 cars. As a footnote, failing Fiat modifiers Siata were owned by Abarth from 1959 until 1961. Siata's own 600-based "Amica" design and 735 cc (44.9 cu in) engine conversion was thus marketed as the Siata-Abarth 750 during those years, but there was little to no actual Abarth involvement with these cars.

=== 750 Gran Turismo / Berlina ===
Appearing in early 1956, Abarth's 750 Gran Turismo Derivazione was the first Abarth product to use the standard Fiat bodywork. Fiat delivered these cars incomplete, to make it easier and more cost effective for Abarth to carry out their performance modifications. Rather than the 633 cc (38.6 cu in) original or Abarth's own 710 cc (43.3 cu in) model, the engine now displaced 747 cc (45.6 cu in) thanks to a one millimetre wider bore and a stroke increased by four millimetres (0.04 and 0.16 in respectively). Sharper cams, lighter flywheel, a bigger carburetor, and myriad other traditional tuning tricks were employed; as a result power nearly doubled, up from 21.5 to 40 hp (16 to 29 kW). Claimed top speed was 130 km/h (80 mph).

=== 750 Zagato ===
Originally the aerodynamic 750 Zagato "double bubble" had a single-cam engine. This was first presented at the 1955 Turin Motor Show. The original model was also offered in a more luxurious variant for export (called "America", as it was almost strictly meant for the United States) and a stripped down model with lower, uncovered headlamps and smaller taillights for the domestic Italian market. The "America" also has a different layout around the rear license plate. The all-aluminium bodywork has Zagato's famous "double-bubble" design and Abarth's tuned derivazione engine with 43 CV (32 kW; 42 hp). Aside from the floorpan, not much of the Fiat 600 remains in use for these cars. By the time of the appearance of the Abarth Zagato Record Monza 750 Bialbero, the bodywork had been unified into a separate model with a rather large hump on the engine lid, made necessary by the taller twin-cam motor. There were then three distinct models: 750 "Double Bubble," 750 Record Monza, and 750 "Sestriere." The Sestriere had a single cam pushrod engine, and the majority were built with a steel body. There were a very small number of alloy cars, a single aluminium car is known to exist today. The Sestriere had upright headlights, and two very large air intakes on the engine lid, much wider than a double bubble. (The Sestriere was believed to be the last model produced for Abarth by Zagato, due to disagreements between Abarth and Zagato.)

The 750 GT Bialbero model appeared at the 1958 Turin Auto Show; along with various alterations to the bodywork it has the new twin-cam engine with 57 CV (42 kW; 56 hp) at 7000 rpm. The Fiat 600 engine presented certain challenges for Gioacchino Colombo in designing a twin-cam head: an engine mount on the rear face of the engine blocked the natural routing for the cam chain, while other restrictions made it impossible to use a classic crossflow design; instead, the carburetors were mounted between the camshafts, on top of the engine, rotated about 45 degrees to provide access to the spark plugs. This location no longer worked as the carburetors and inlets grew larger, and Abarth developed a distinctive banana-shaped intake manifold which allowed for two carburetors to be perched to either side above the engine. This, by necessity, made the Bialbero engine quite tall, necessitating sizable bulges and bumps in the bodywork on lower designs like the Zagato or various Spiders.

The first Bialbero series constituted 100 cars, enough to homologate the car for the Gran Turismo competition category. 750 Bialbero-equipped Fiat-Abarth Zagato Record Monzas featured a lower roof with no bubbles and one single centered air scoop on the engine lid. "The Record Monza" was the most successful racing Abarth in the USA with the Franklin D. Roosevelt Jr Racing team, (Abarth cars winning over 700 races worldwide), including both Sebring with the 750 cc Bialbero engine and Daytona under-1,000 cc (61 cu in) races in 1959 widely believed to have had the first 982 cc (59.9 cu in) Bialbero engine.

There was also a very rare Zagato Spyder version produced, only between two and four examples are believed to have been built. This model was first shown at the 1957 Turin Auto Show, and it was then shown again the next year. The design has the usual sleek Zagato front end, with distinct fins at the rear. The bump on the engine lid came in for some period critique for disfiguring the overall design. Max power from Abarth's 747 cc (45.6 cu in) engine is 44 CV (32 kW; 43 hp), enough for a top speed of 153 km/h (95 mph) in a period road test or 145 km/h (90 mph) according to Abarth themselves. The Spyder's list price in Italy was the same as for the berlinetta Zagato, 1,535,000 Lira in 1958. The 1958 Turin Show car had the twin cam engine, with similar performance to the berlinetta, although the "little castle" disfiguring the engine lid was even larger on this model.

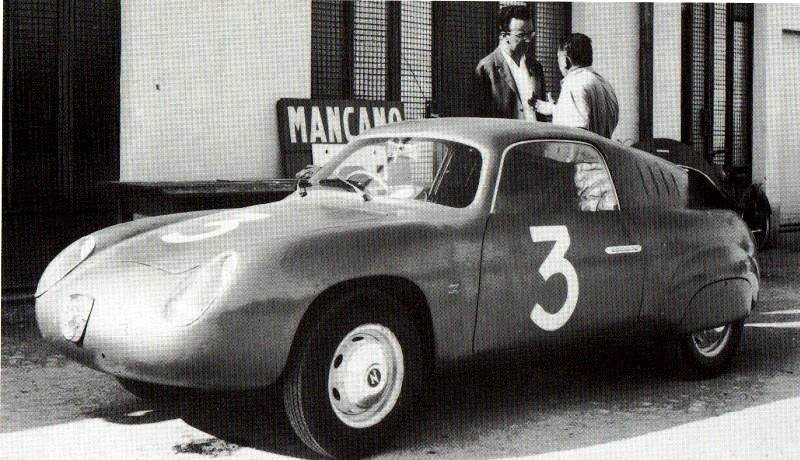
1956 Fiat-Abarth 750 GT Zagato "Aerodinamico"

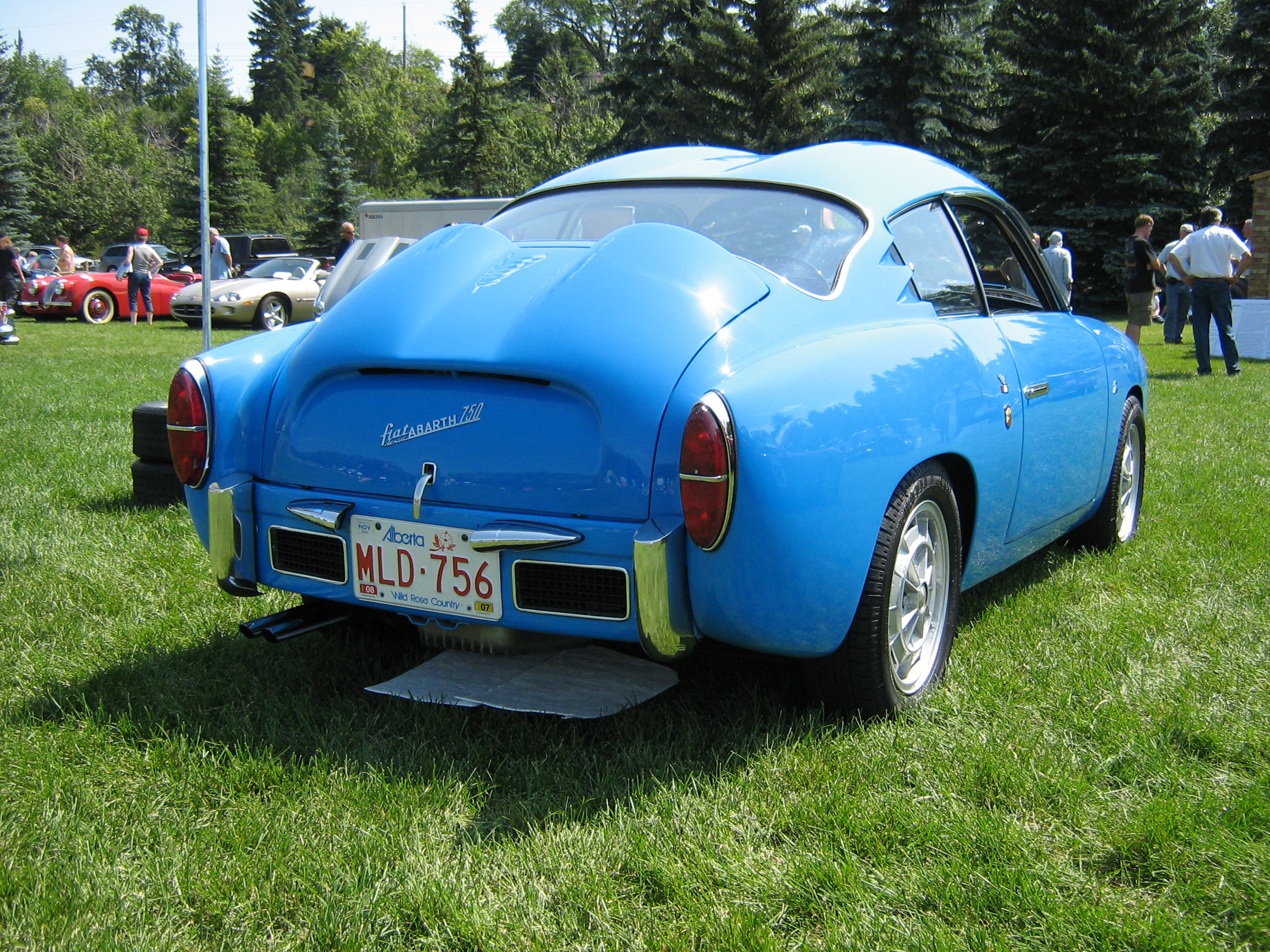
Rear of a 1959 750 GT Zagato, showing the double-bubble roof and the distinct engine lid necessary to clear the pushrod engine's upright carburetor and air cleaner

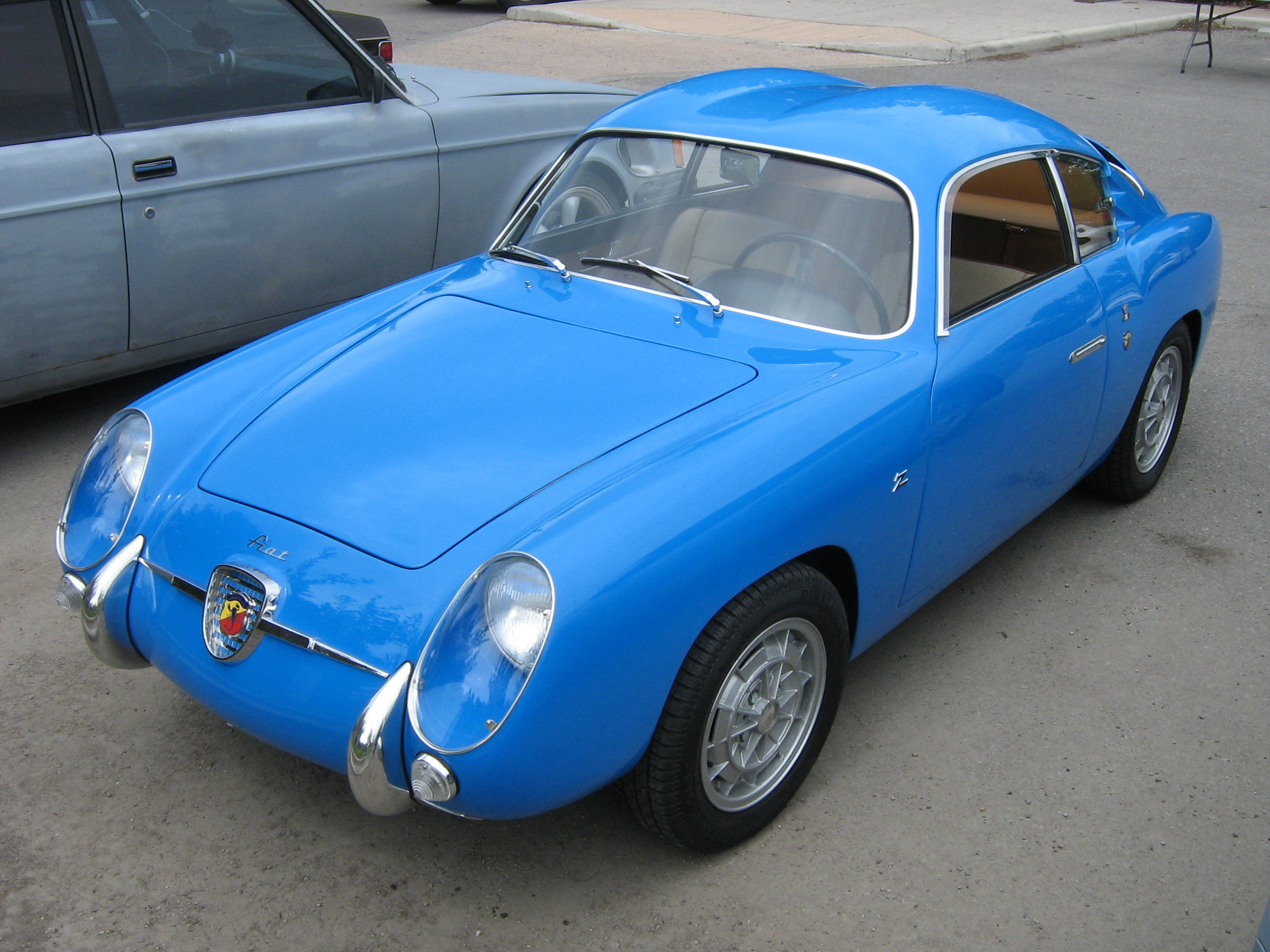
Front of a 1959 Fiat-Abarth 750 GT Zagato

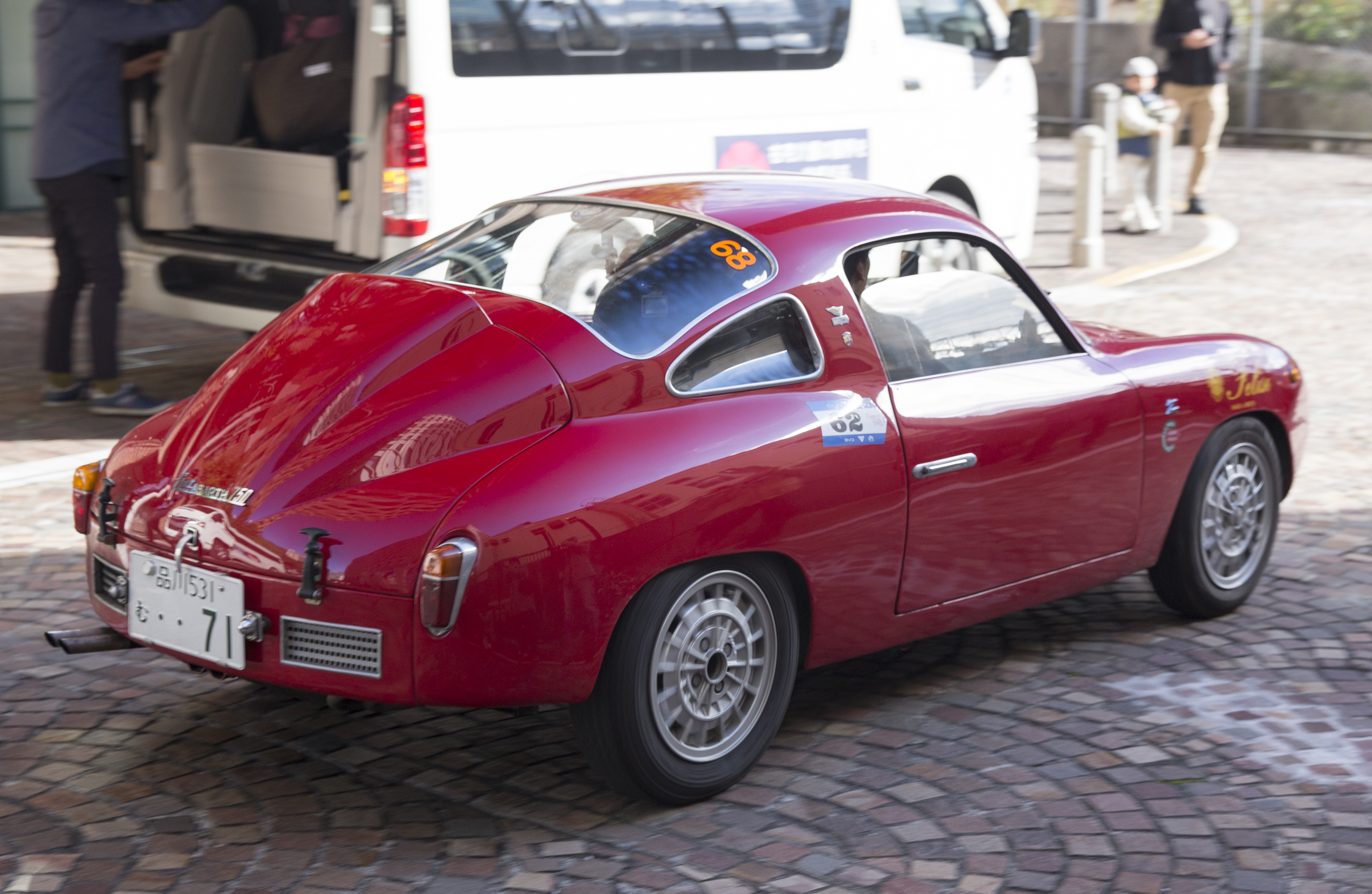
1959 Abarth 750 Record Monza Zagato; sleeker than the GT

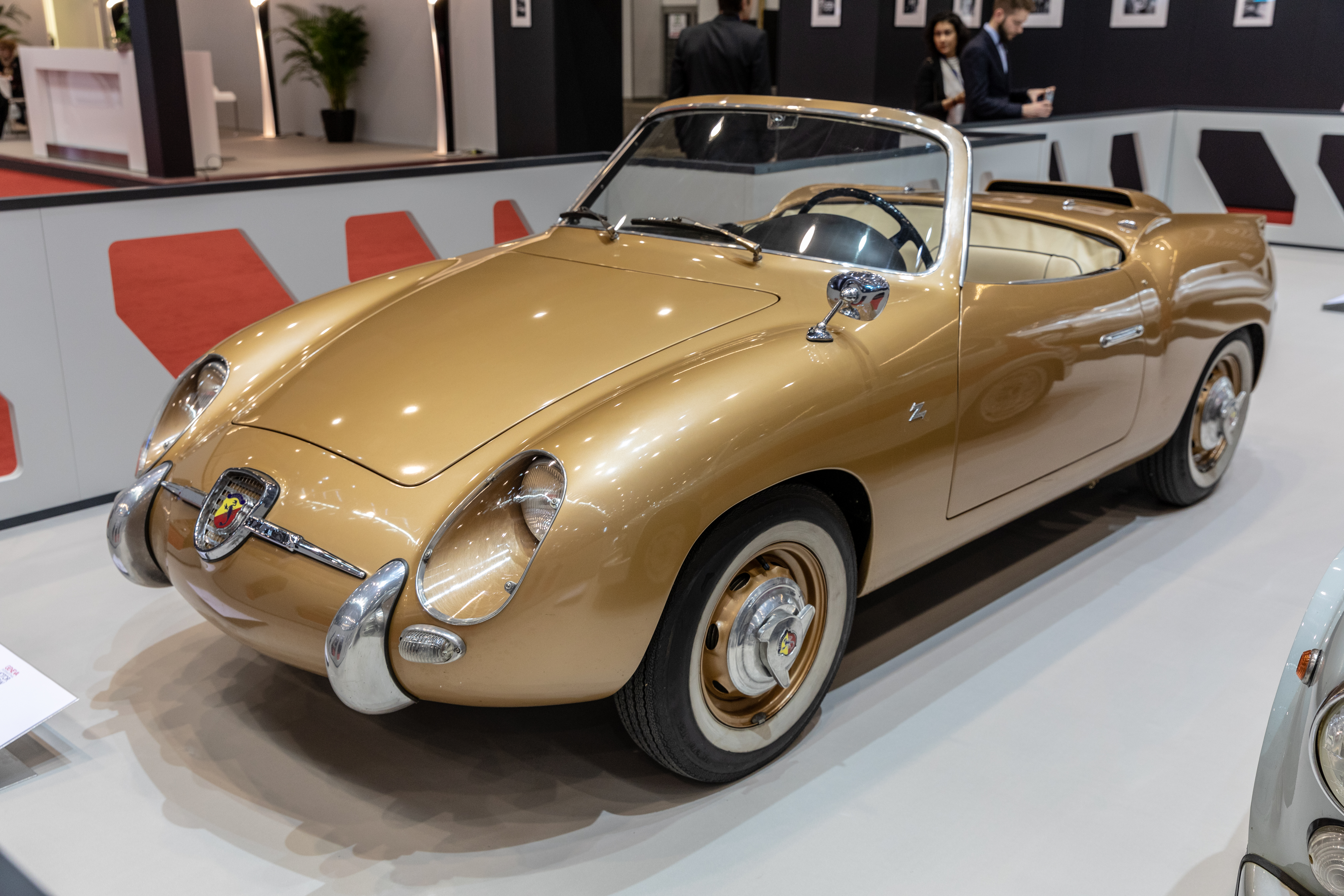
One of possibly two Zagato-bodied Fiat-Abarth 750 Spyders

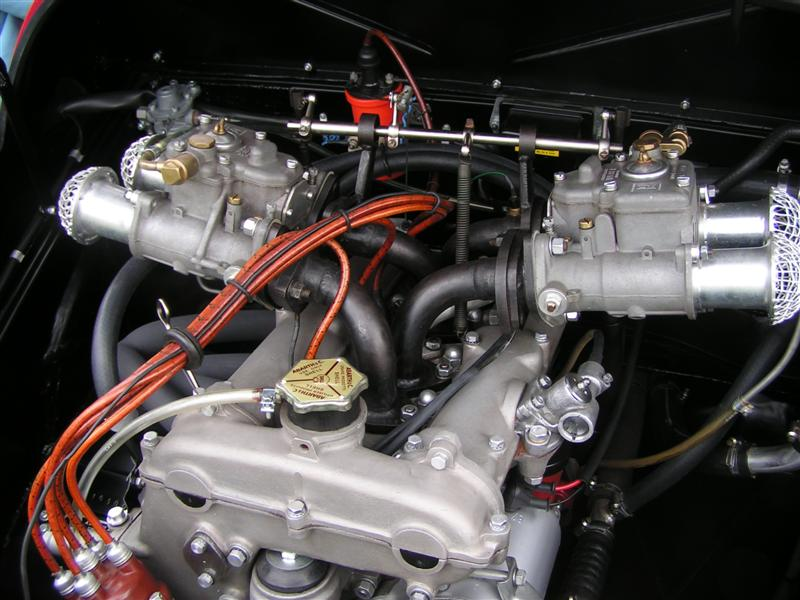
The distinctive manifold on later, Weber 40DCOE-equipped Bialbero engine

=== Abarth 700S ===
To suit newly reshuffled Gran Turismo racing categories, a 698 cc (42.6 cu in) version was introduced at the 1959 Turin Auto Show. The Twin Cam ("Bialbero") model produces 64 CV (47 kW; 63 hp) at 7,100 rpm. One of these, with Zagato-style bodywork, did start at the 1960 Le Mans but it only managed 31 laps. This model may have remained a single example, while the 850 and 1000 models which arrived around the same time went on to be built for many more years.

== 850 ==
=== 850 Allemano ===
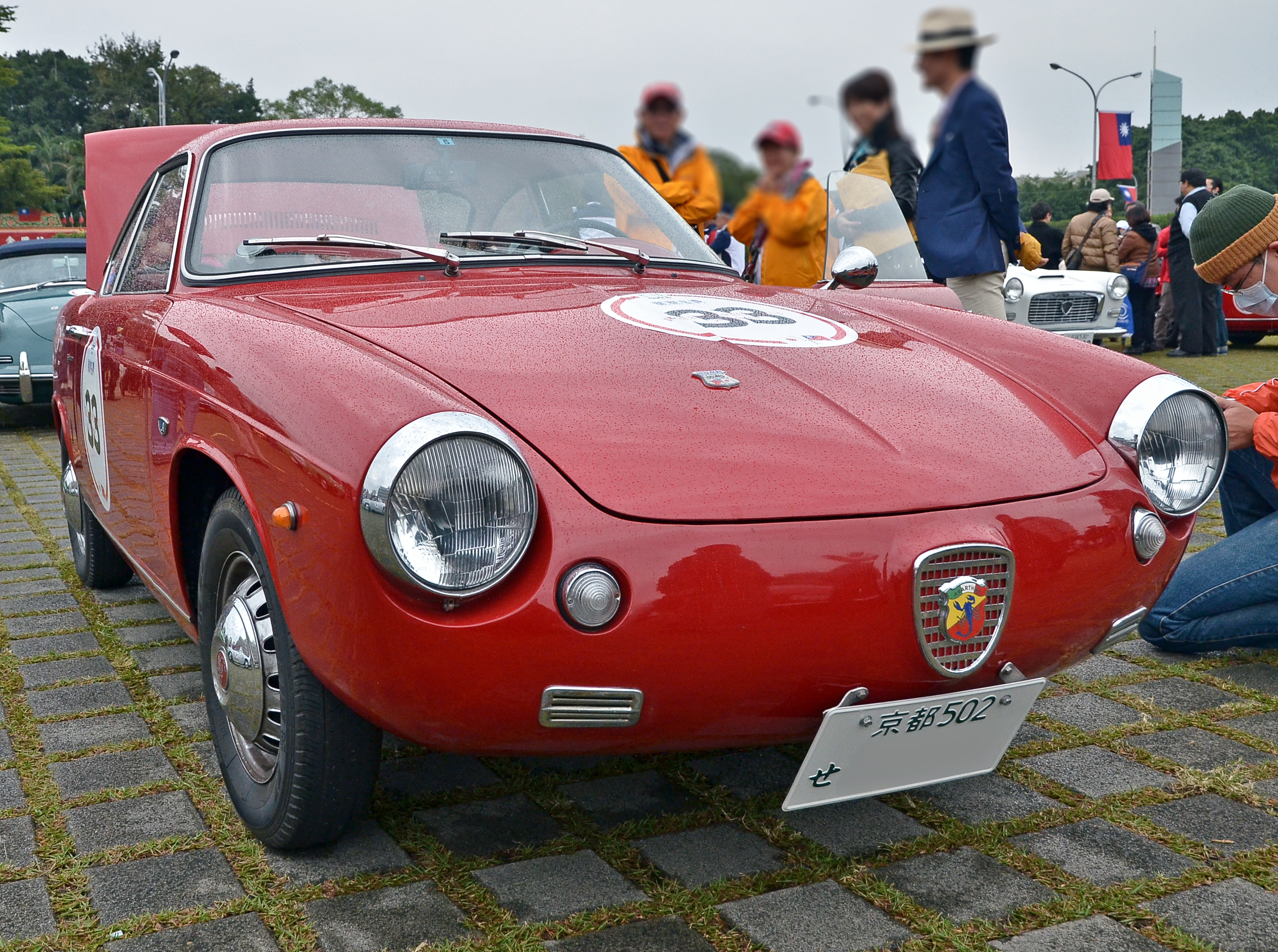
1961 Abarth 850 Allemano coupé

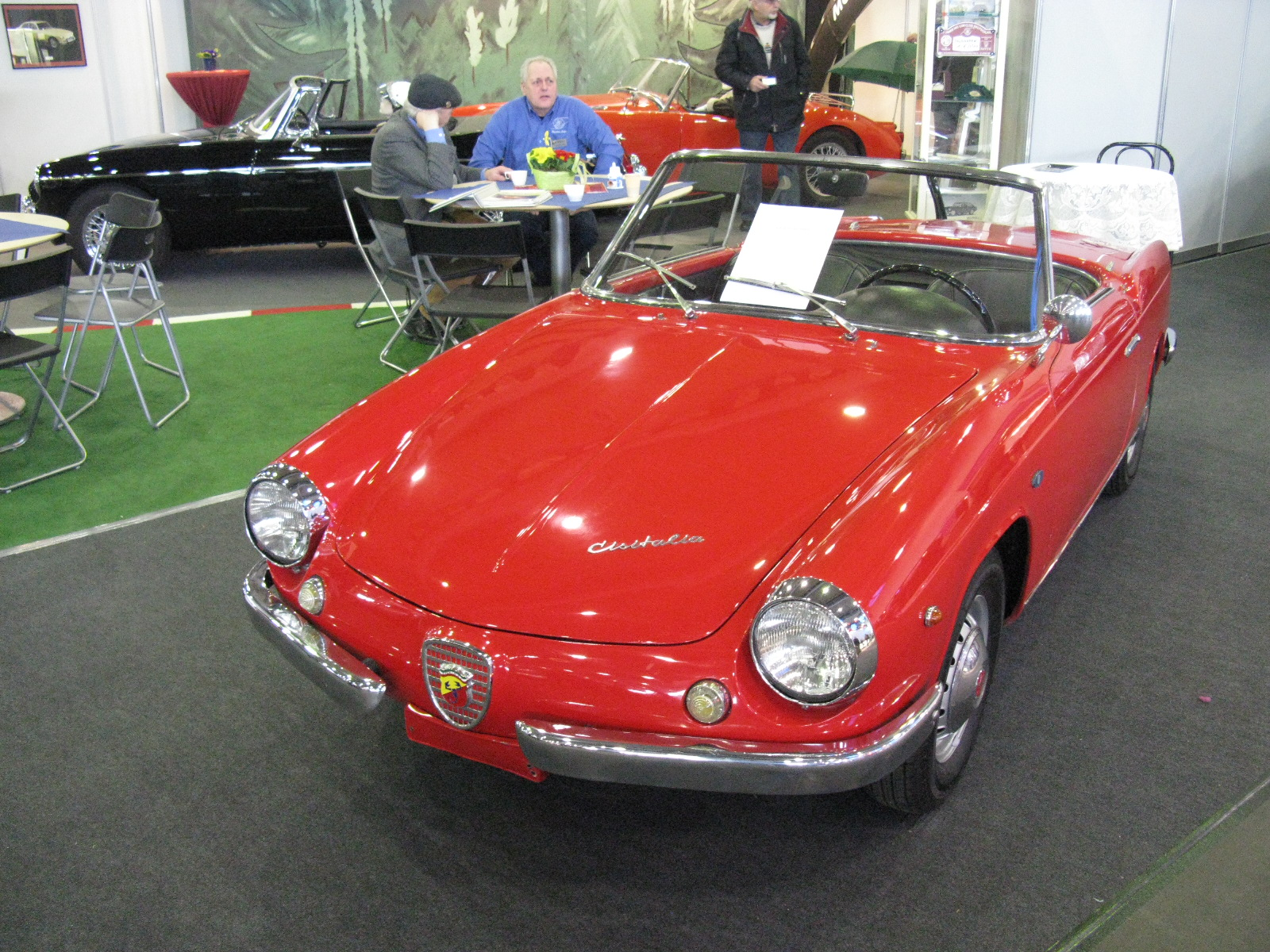
1961 Abarth Cisitalia Spider

The Abarth 850 Spider has bodywork by Allemano and was first shown in the spring of 1960. The engine is a Fiat-based 850 single-cam unit which develops 52 CV (38 kW; 51 hp) CUNA at 6,000 rpm. Overall length is 3,600 mm (140 in), overall width is 1,420 mm (56 in), height is 1,200 mm (47 in), and the weight is 610 kg (1,345 lb). The claimed top speed is 154 km/h (96 mph). A coupé model was also later developed, more elegant and comfortable than Zagato's version but heavier and less sporting.

Allemano's bodywork was later also made available with the larger 1000 engine. This bodywork was also used by Cisitalia's Argentinian daughter company, who built the car in a variety of models with 760, 800, or 850 cc engines.

=== 850TC Berlina ===
Fiat-Abarth 850 TC
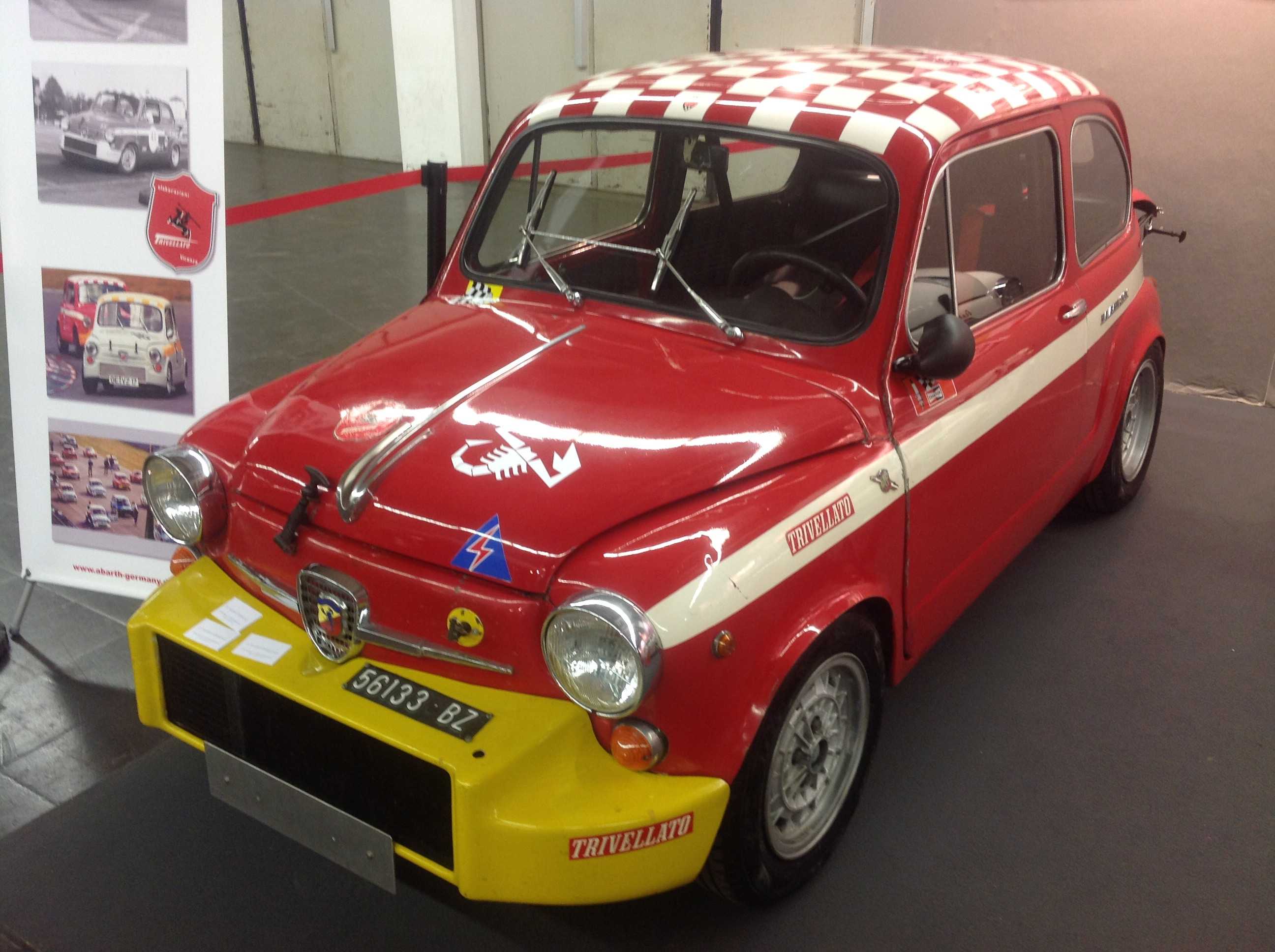

Overview
- Manufacturer: Abarth
- Production: 1961–1969

Body and chassis
- Class: Group 2 touring car
- Layout: RR

Powertrain
- Engine: 847 cc I4
- Transmission: 4-speed manual

Dimensions
- Wheelbase: 2,000 mm (78.7 in)
- Length: 3,530–3,607 mm (139.0–142.0 in)
- Width: 1,390–1,499 mm (54.7–59.0 in)
- Height: 1,301–1,400 mm (51.2–55.1 in)
- Curb weight: 585–610 kg (1,290–1,345 lb)

The Fiat-Abarth 850TC Berlina (Turismo Competizione, or "touring competition") was introduced towards the end of 1960. Originally built to Group 2 touring car specifications, it was manufactured between 1961 and 1969. It uses the Fiat 600 bodywork with some modifications, most notably a boxlike structure ahead of the front bumper which held the engine's oil cooler. The rear fenders were usually blistered, so as to accommodate larger wheels. The engine is a four-cylinder model based on a Fiat unit, with 847 cc capacity and 52 CV (38 kW; 51 hp) CUNA rating. Overall length is 3,090 mm (122 in), overall width is 1,400 mm (55 in), height is 1,380 mm (54 in), wheelbase is 2,000 mm (80 in), and its front and rear track are 1,160 mm (46 in). The fuel tank holds 5.9 imperial gallons. The 850TC remained in the price lists until 1966.

In 1962 the 850TC Nürburgring was introduced, with 55 CV (40 kW) at 6500 rpm. The name was intended to celebrate the class victory of an Abarth 850TC at the 1961 Nürburgring 500 km race. There followed the 850TC/SS with two more horsepower; this was renamed the 850TC Nürburgring Corsa towards the end of the year.

Between 1962 and 1971 the 850cc and 1,000cc class cars won hundreds of races all over the World and were commonly called "Giant Killers" due to their superior performance over much larger cars. This culminated in a famous dispute with SCCA authorities in the USA when Alfred Cosentino (FAZA) was banned from running his 1970 Fiat Abarth Berlina Corsa 1000 TCR "Radiale" engine because his car was faster (mainly in wet conditions) than many of its V8-powered contemporaries. The SCCA authorities dictated FAZA and Cosentino be forced to use an earlier, non-Radiale, engine design from the 1962 model in their cars. They still achieved 51 victories from 53 races, the most victories in SCCA racing history, thereby cementing the superiority of the Fiat Abarth Berlina Corsa over larger and more powerful cars.

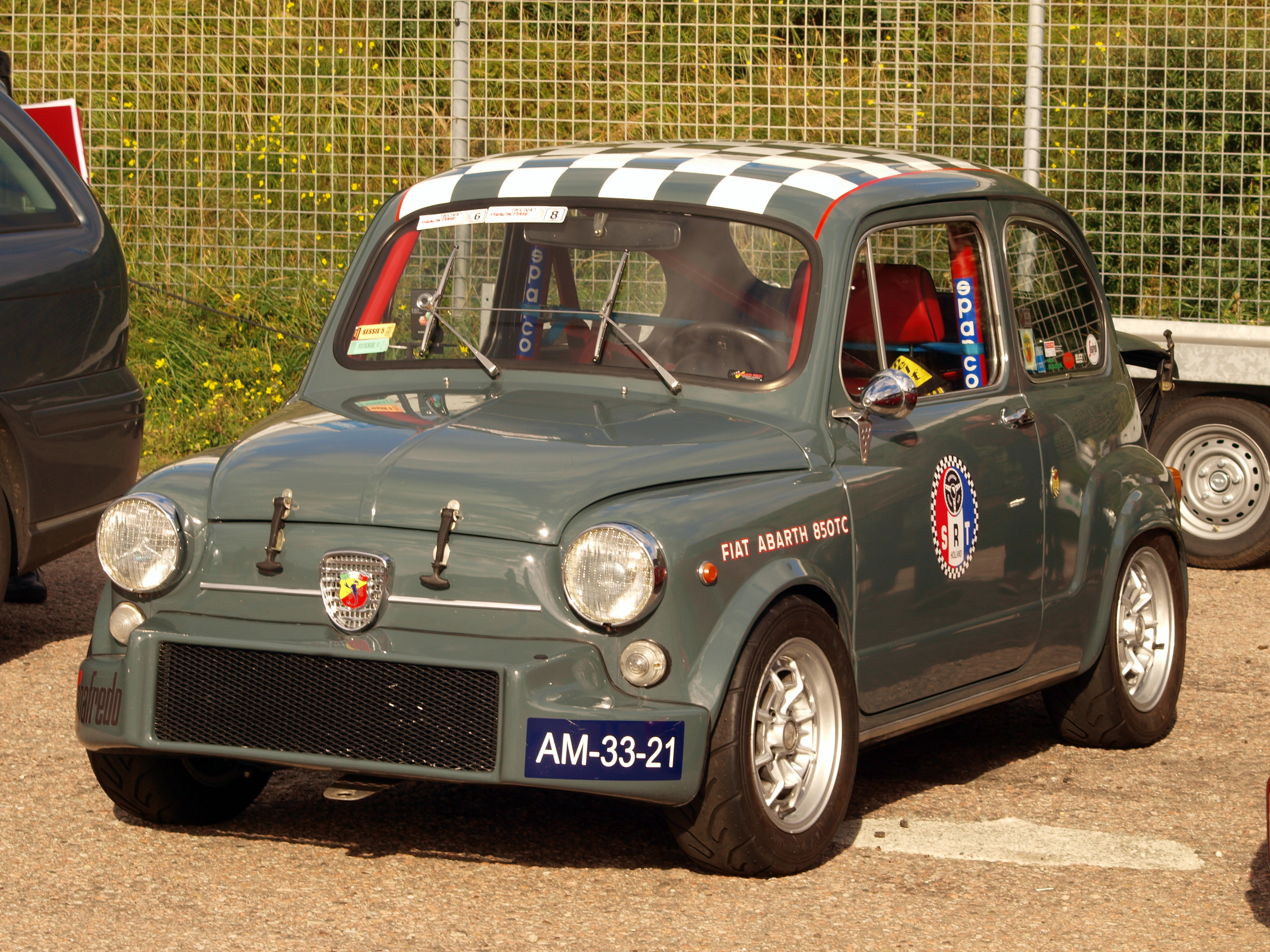

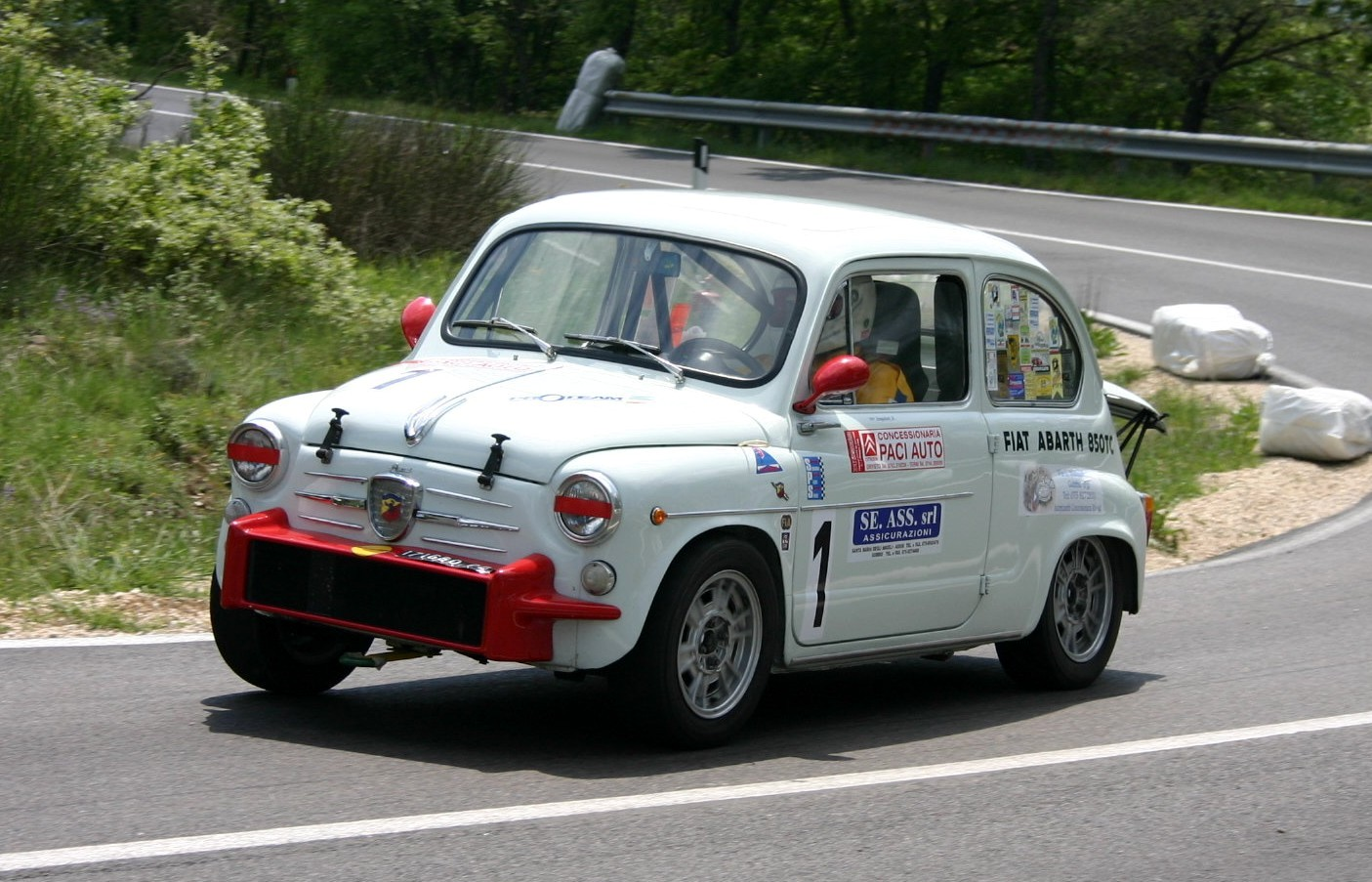

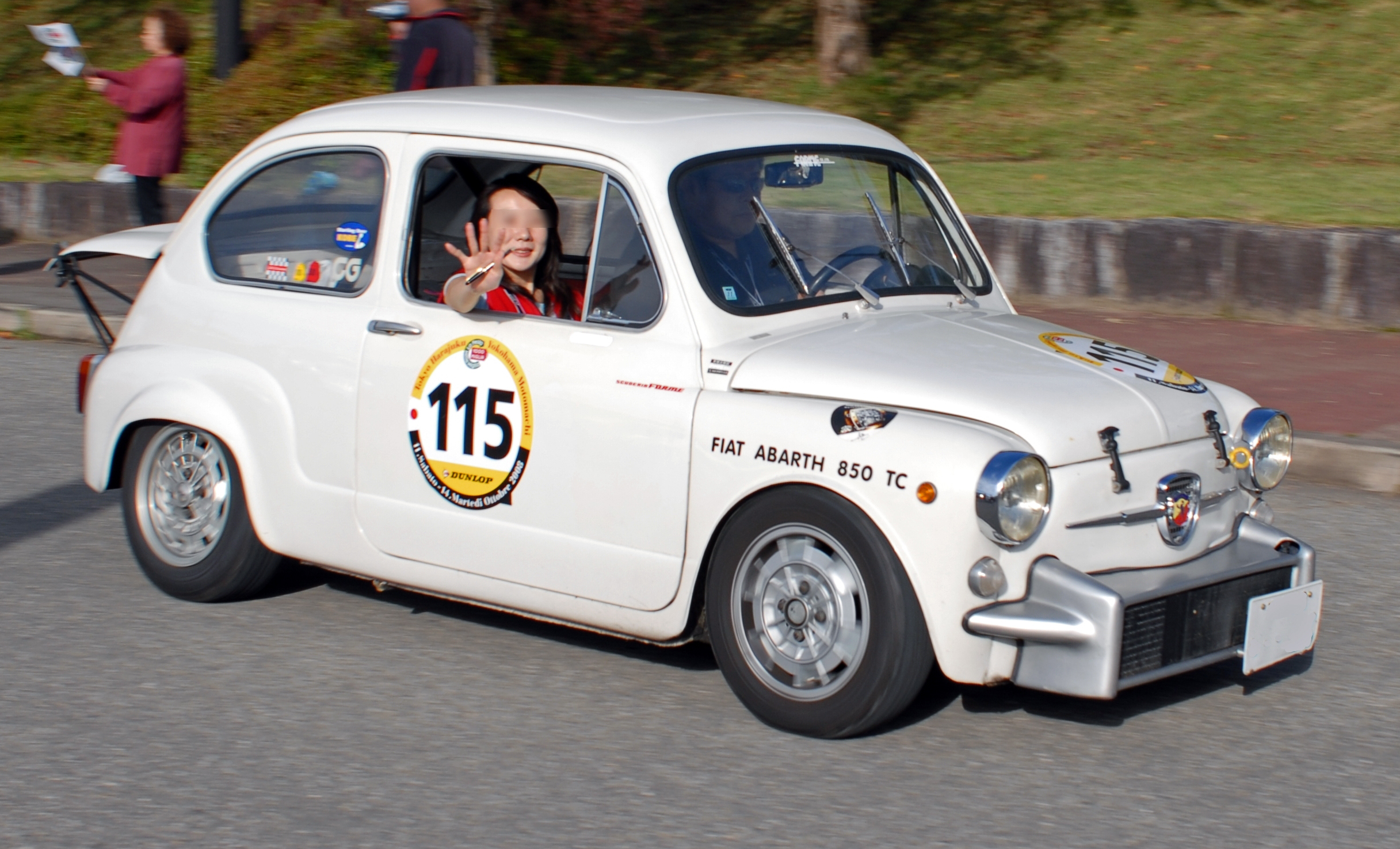
Fiat-Abarth 850TC Berlina

== 1000 ==
=== 1000 Zagato, 1000 Bialbero ===
The first Fiat 600-based Abarth to be fitted with the larger 982 cc development of the 600-based Bialbero engine was the Zagato-bodied Berlinetta, similar in appearance to the 750 and 850 Monza models. It was first shown at the October 1960 Paris Motor Show and produces 91 PS (67 kW; 90 hp) at 7,100 rpm. Twin Weber carburetors and a 9.3 to 1 compression ratio help reach this considerable output for a one-litre engine. Claimed top speed is 205 km/h (127 mph). The Abarth 1000 Bialbero won the European GT championship for cars under 1,000 cc in 1962 and 1963.

A bewildering variety of slightly different bodystyle elements appeared over the years, with covered and uncovered headlights, different engine lids, taillights, and window arrangements, as well as a later long-tailed design which also received a longer nosecone. Since these cars were largely handbuilt and often to order, it is hard to say what is original and what may have been modified after many years of competition. Ugo Zagato received a Compasso d'Oro 1960 award for Abarth 1000 Zagato's design.

Later models used very similar bodywork built in-house; these models are called Abarth 1000 Bialbero. The regular engine's power was bumped up to 97 PS (71 kW; 96 hp), while the Corsa model produced 104 PS (76 kW; 103 hp) at 7,600 rpm thanks to twin Weber 36 DCD carburettors and a 10.8 to 1 compression ratio.

=== Monomille ===
Again based on the Fiat 600D, the Monomille also has the pushrod 982 cc motor and was sold alongside the twin-cam Bialbero as a lower-priced, less complicated alternative. The chassis was largely unchanged from the 600, aside from providing disc brakes at all four wheels. The engine has a 9.0:1 compression ratio and a Solex 34PBIC carburettor and produces 60 PS (44 kW) at 6,200 rpm.

Bodywork was in the style of Zagato's, although it was executed by Abarth themselves. The cars carry a "Carrozzeria Abarth" badge. For the last year of production, 1964, the rear end was changed to a coda tronca (cut tail) design.

=== 1000 TC/TCR Berlina ===
It may seem strange that a one-litre economy car can be considered a racing car, but in its day, the Abarth 1000 TC and all its variants were fierce racing machines with international success and acclaim. The car's 85 hp (63 kW) at 7,600 rpm was plenty for a car weighing in at only 583 kg (1,285 lb). The Fiat-Abarth 1000 TC (sometimes called the 1000 Berlina Corsa) is a special high-performance racing-oriented version of the Fiat 600, designed and developed by Italian manufacturer Abarth, and built to Group 2 (and later Group 5) touring car specifications. The first 1000 TC was built in 1964. The 1000 TC Berlina's suspension layout was largely unchanged from the 600D, albeit with larger wheels and disc brakes all around. On the outside, the 1000 Berlina received fender extensions, a large front bumper housing the oil cooler, and a permanently open engine lid - ostensibly for cooling, but the shape also provided significant aerodynamic downforce.

There was also a Group 5 development called the 1000 TCR which used Abarth's Radiale cylinder head for even more power. The TCR produces 112 hp (82 kW).

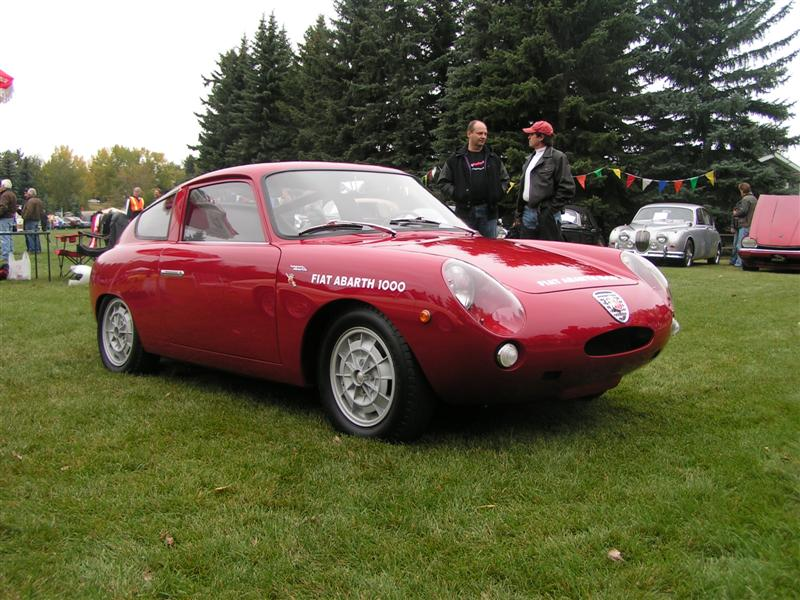
Fiat-Abarth 1000 Bialbero Zagato (1961)

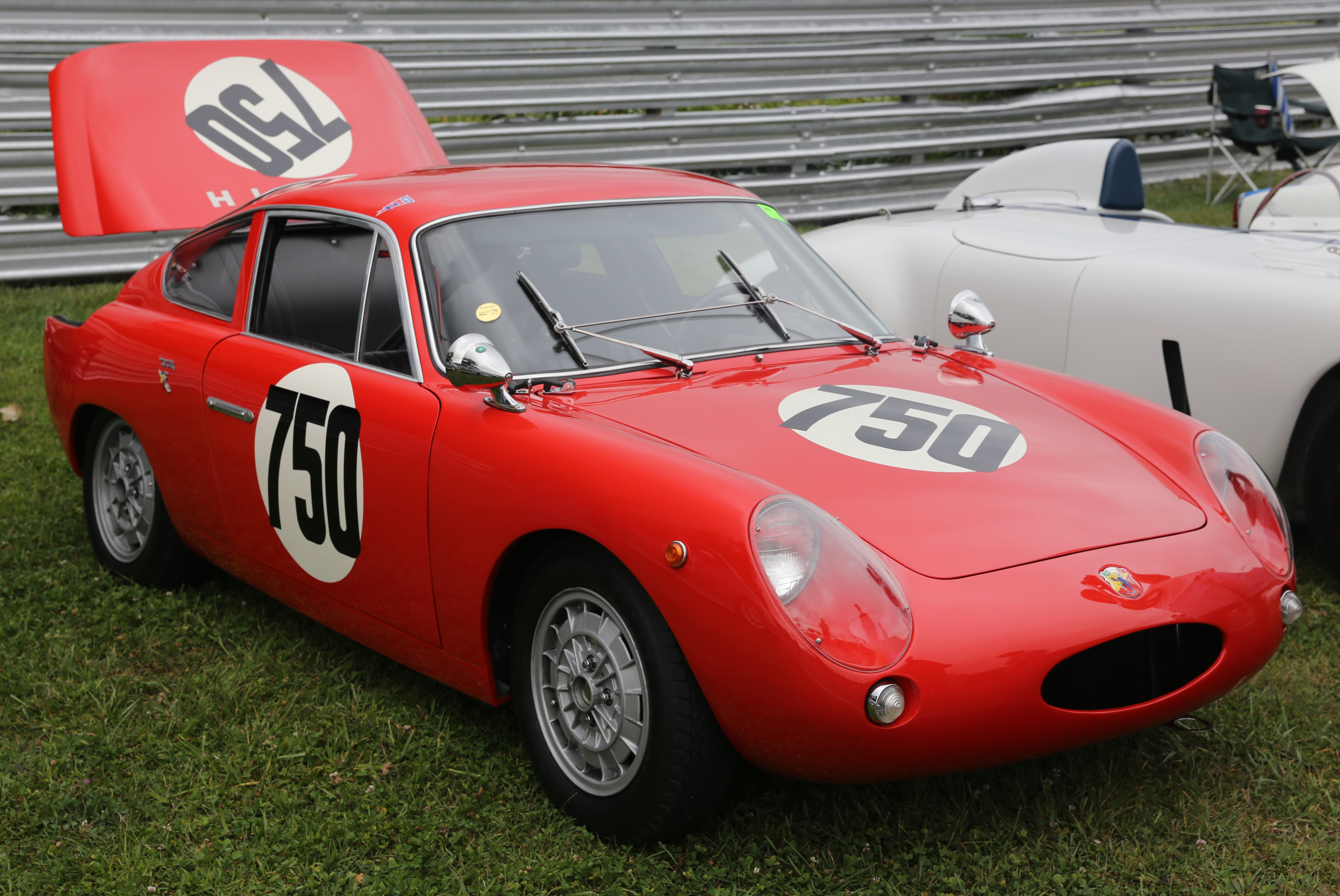
Abarth Monomille (1963)

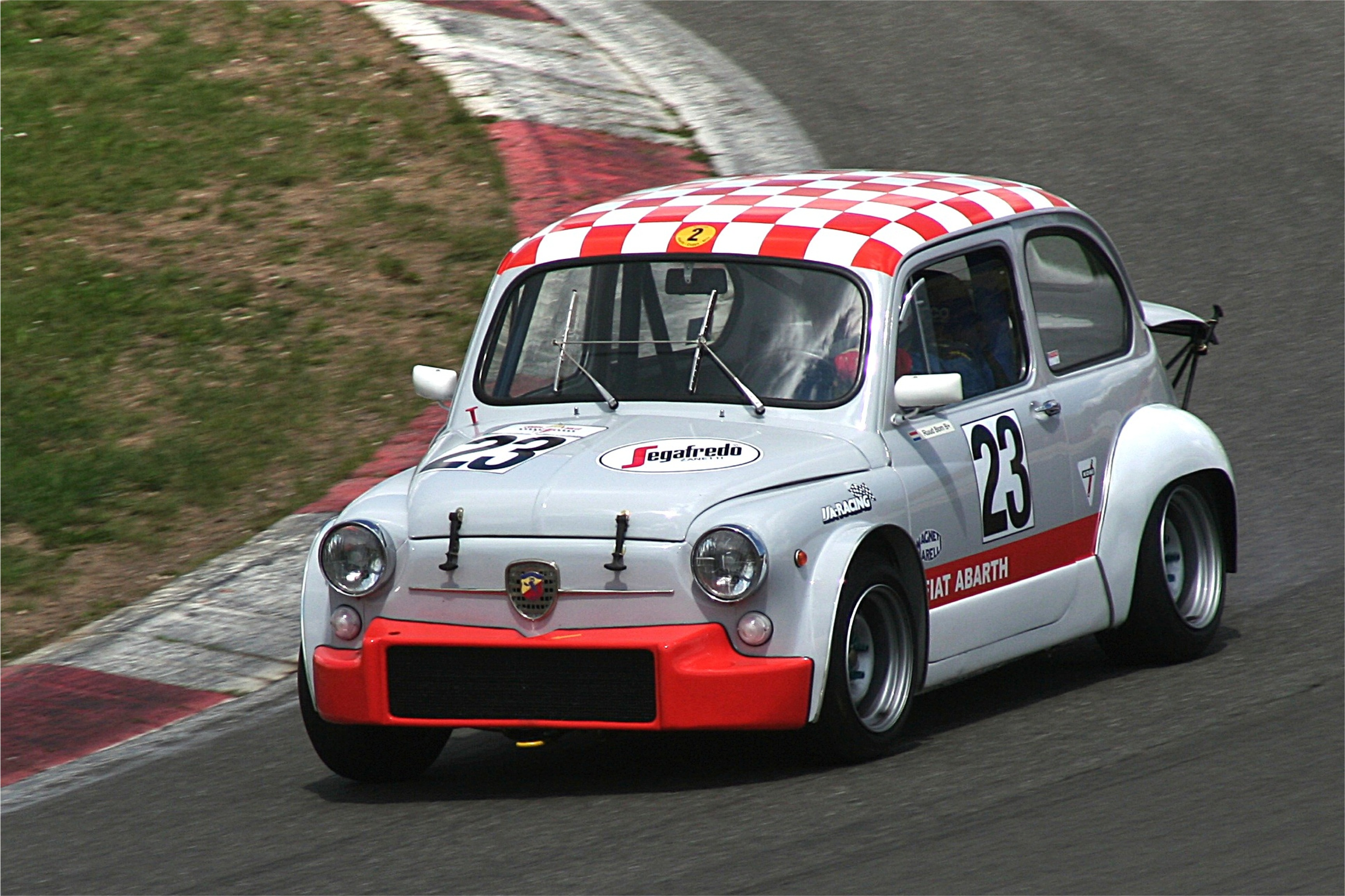
Fiat-Abarth 1000 TC Berlina (1970)

== List of names ==
This is a list of the various models available that retained the standard "Berlina" bodywork:

- 1956–1959 : Fiat derivazione Abarth 750, Berlina (stradale)
- December 1960–January 1961: Fiat derivazione Abarth 850, Berlina (stradale)
- February 1961–December 1964: Fiat Abarth 850 TC Berlina (stradale)
- November 1961–December 1964: Fiat Abarth 850 TC Nurburgring Berlina (stradale)
- July 1962–December 1964: Fiat Abarth 1000 Berlina (stradale)
- 1963–1969: Fiat Abarth 1000 Berlina Corsa -gr.2
- 1963–1969: Fiat Abarth 850 TC Corsa -gr.2
- 1968–1969: Fiat Abarth 1000 TCR (Radiale - "pendolare") -gr.5
- 1968–1969: Fiat Abarth 850 TCR (Radiale - "pendolare") -gr.5
- 1970: Fiat Abarth 1000 TCR (Radiale . "pendolare" - larga) gr. 2
