= Henri Perrier =

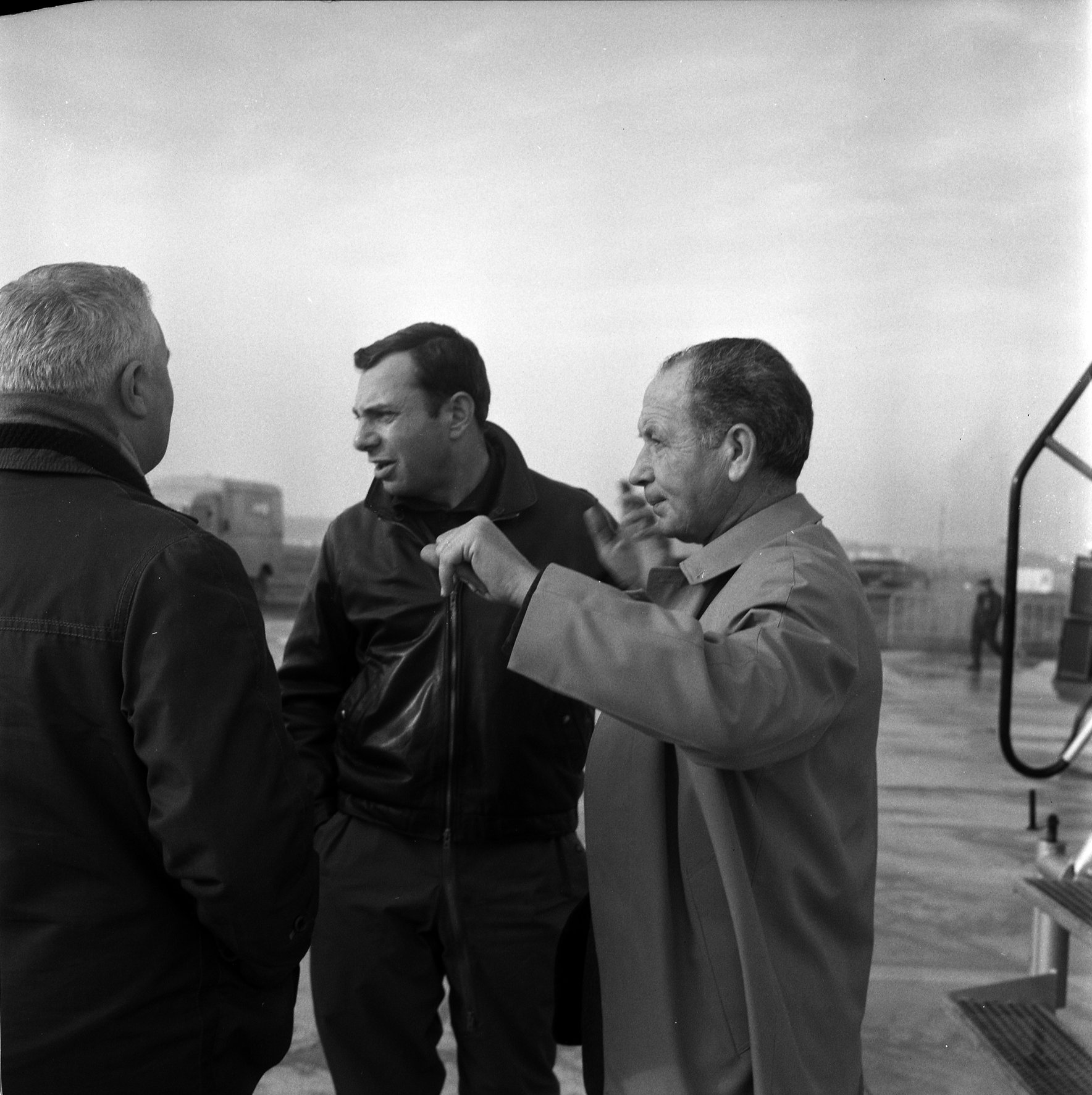
- Perrier (center), 1968
- Born: 28 June 1929; France
- Died: 6 May 2012 (aged 82); Toulouse, France
- Education: Supaéro
- Occupations: aerospace engineer, flight test engineer
- Known for: development and flight testing of Concorde

Henri Perrier (June 28, 1929 – May 6, 2012) was an aerospace engineer from France, known for his crucial role in the development and flight testing of the Concorde.

== Biography ==
=== Education and early career ===
Henri Perrier graduated from Supaéro in 1953 and began his career at SNCASO. He joined the EPNER in 1955 and became a flight test engineer. He took part in the testing of the Vautour, Trident, and Caravelle aircraft.

=== Concorde program ===
Perrier played a key role in the Concorde's test program starting in the 1960s. He was on board the aircraft for its maiden flight on 2 March 1969.

He succeeded André Turcat as Director of Flight Testing in 1976. He oversaw historic flights such as the one on 26 September 1973 from Paris to Washington with 100 passengers at Mach 2.

He was also involved in the development of the C-160 Transall, Airbus A300, and ATR aircraft, and later served as an advisor to the Groupement des industries françaises aéronautiques et spatiales (GIFAS) after retiring.

=== Legal proceedings ===
Following the Concorde crash in 2000, Perrier was placed under investigation but was acquitted in 2010. He died before the appeal trial concluded.

== Death ==
Henri Perrier died in Toulouse on 6 May 2012. He was hailed as "the soul of Concorde" by former colleagues.

== Legacy ==
His name remains strongly associated with the Concorde project, symbolizing for many the precision and excellence of French aerospace engineering.

== See also ==
- Flight testing
- Aérospatiale
