= John Wyer =

British racing engineer and team manager (1909–1989)

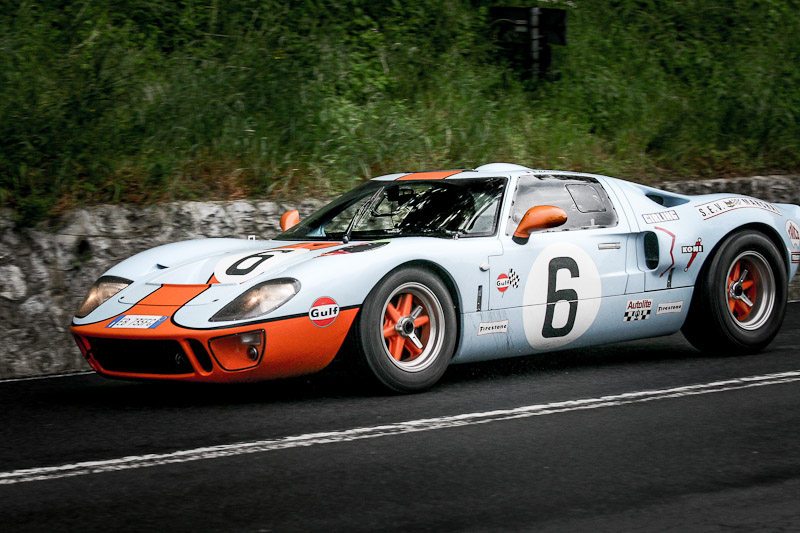
A Gulf-liveried Ford GT40

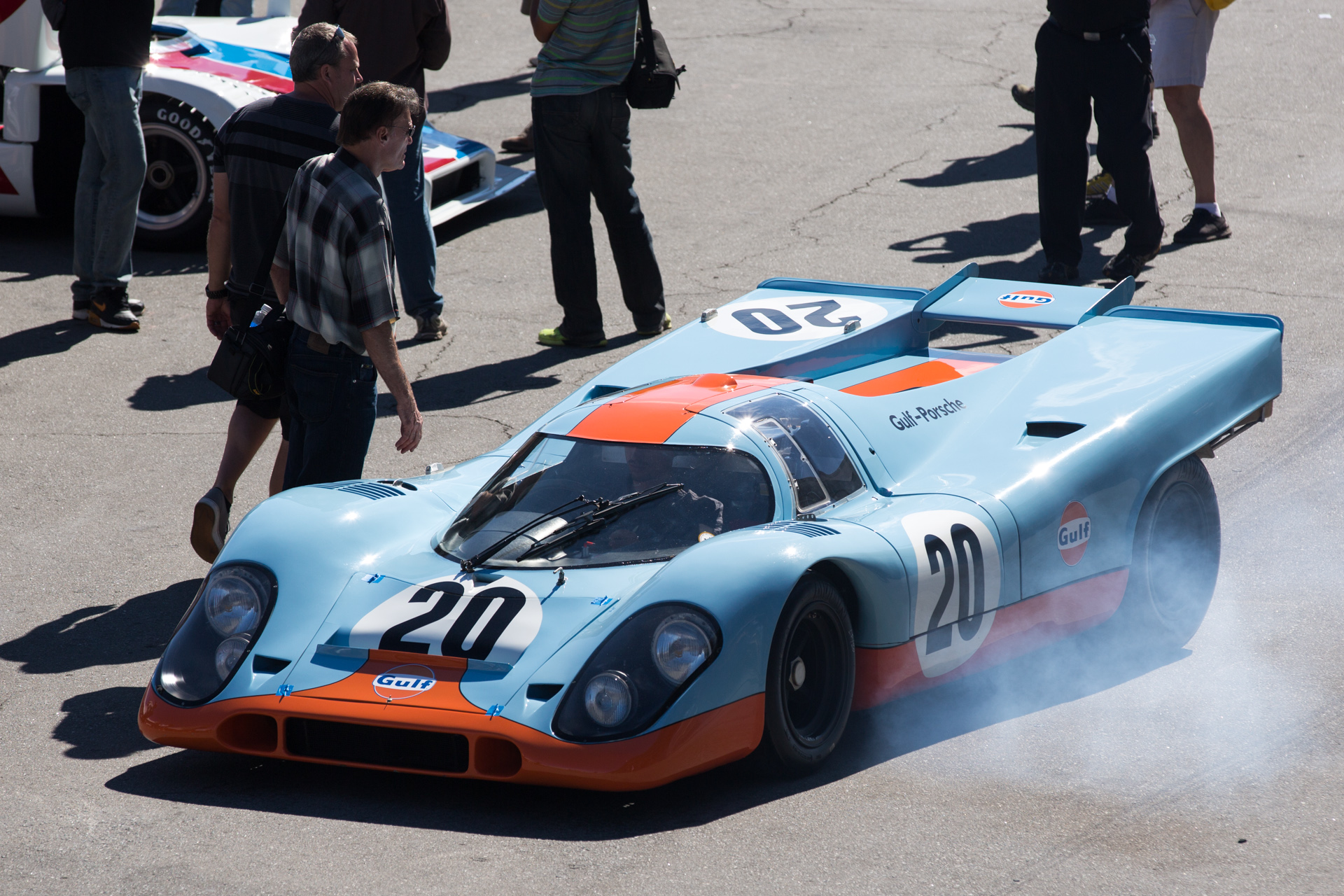
Porsche 917K in the distinctive Gulf Oil livery

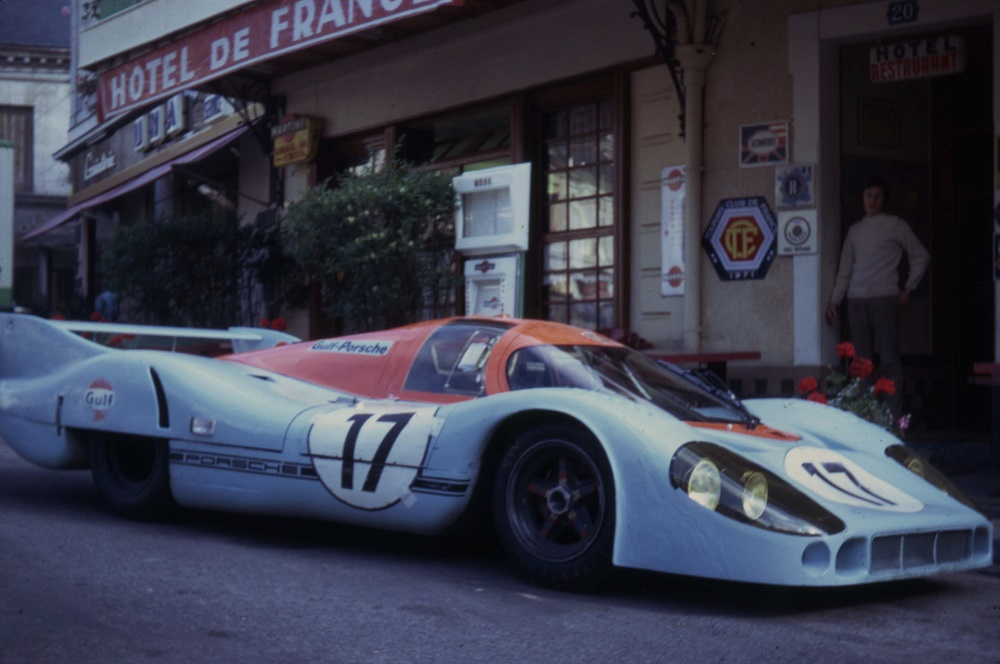
1971 Le Mans Porsche 917LH driven by Derek Bell & Jo Siffert parked outside the Hotel de France

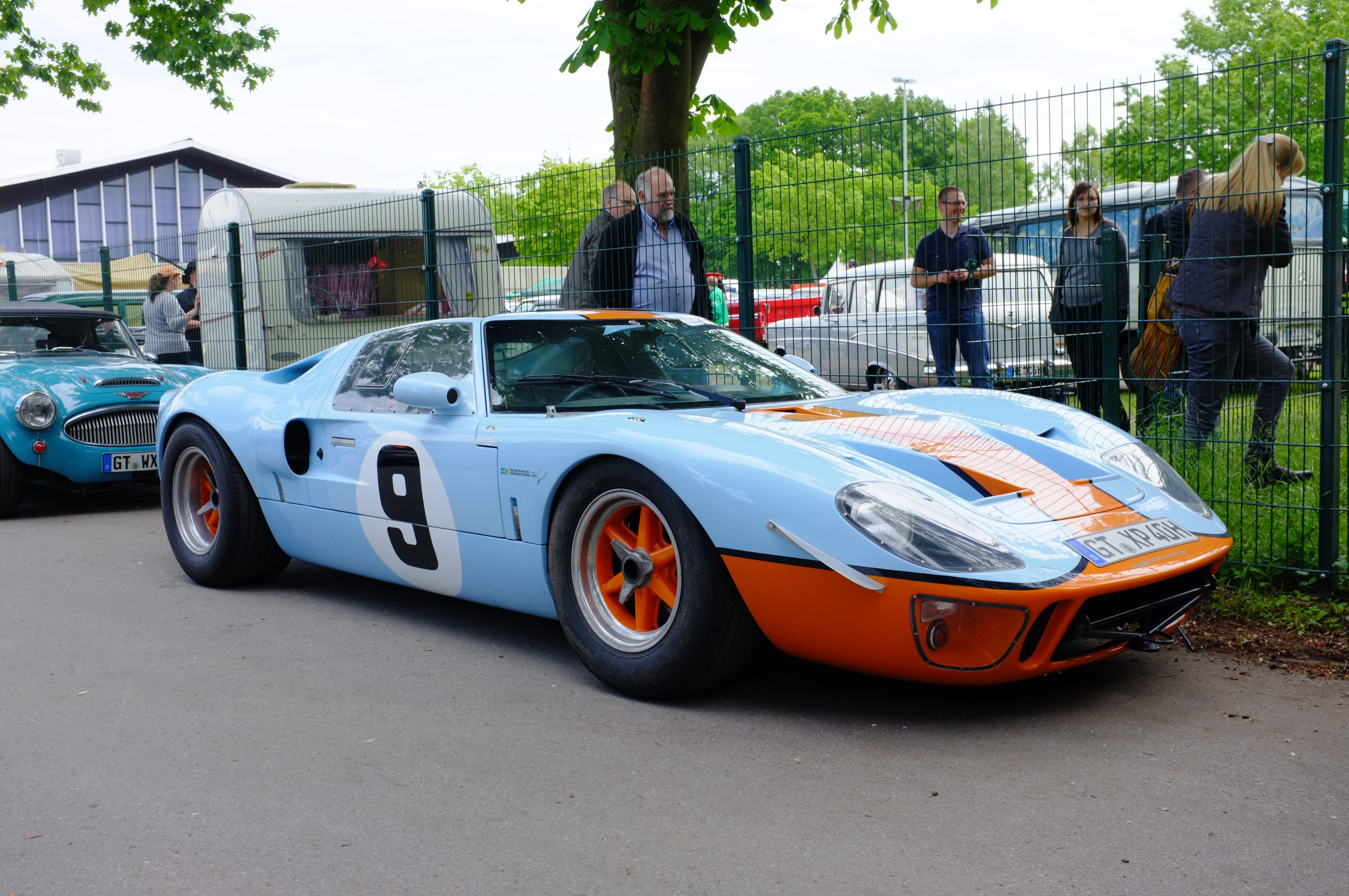
Replica of a Ford GT40 Mk I with #9 from Rodríguez and Bianchi winners of the 1968 24 Hours of Le Mans.

John Wyer (11 December 1909 – 8 April 1989), was an English automobile racing engineer and team manager. He is mainly associated with cars running in the light blue and orange livery of his longtime sponsor Gulf Oil.

== Biography ==
=== Early life ===
Wyer was born in Kidderminster, England in 1909.

=== Aston Martin ===
As team manager and team owner, Wyer won the 24 Hours of Le Mans several times. His first victory came in the 1959 edition, in his tenth anniversary as Aston Martin team manager, along with Roy Salvadori and Carroll Shelby, win with the DBR1. The team made their base for Le Mans at the Hotel De France from 1953 - 1975. The race cars would be tended within the courtyard and garage adjacent to the hotel before being driven to and from the circuit on the road for practice, qualifying and the race.

The team also won the 1000 km Nürburgring over three consecutive years.

=== Ford Advanced Vehicles ===
In 1963 he left Aston Martin for Ford Advanced Vehicles (FAV) In 1964. After dismal results with the GT40s in their first two years, mainly dealing with reliability due to mechanical failure, the Ford GT40 programme was handed over to Holman Moody and Carroll Shelby to compete against Ferrari, with the 1966 24 Hours of Le Mans victory being the most famous, as well as 1967.

=== J. W. Automotive Engineering Ltd ===
Ford closed FAV after the 1966 season, and John Wyer and John Willment formed J.W. Automotive Engineering Ltd (JWA) to take over the Slough factory and continued to build production GT40s on Ford's behalf. As Wyer was the well known team manager and present at race tracks, it was assumed that JW stands for John Wyer even though it is for John Willment, as stated by Willment's brother-in-law Hans Herrmann.

With backing from Gulf Oil and their team manager J-O Bockman, Wyer created the Ford-powered Mirage M-1, a prototype that won the 1967 1000 km Spa. Due to a rule change that came in effect for 1968, the fast big engine prototypes were limited to 3,000 cc like in Formula 1. As only few of them were available, sportscars with up to 5,000 cc were allowed also if at least 50 of them were built. This applied to the two-year-old Ford GT40s, which were modified by Wyer. As a surprise, Wyer won the World Sportscar Championship for Ford in 1968 even though the 2,200 cc Porsche 907 were considered favourites at the beginning of the season. The superior power of the 302 cubic inch (4,942 cc) V8 in the GT40s allowed them to win on fast tracks, and especially at Le Mans two years in a row from 1968 (Pedro Rodríguez and Lucien Bianchi) and 1969 (Jacky Ickx and Jackie Oliver), even though they were outclassed at twistier tracks.

It became apparent the GT40 would become obsolete after 1968 as the minimum numbers of sportscars was lowered to 25, a loop hole of which Porsche took advantage by building over two dozen 5,000 cc prototypes that were homologated as sports cars in 1969. The Porsche 917 were fast but in 1969 still unreliable and with bad handling. After the 1969 season, Wyer switched also to the 917 (and 908 for slow tracks), and the JWA team became the factory's main partner. They were a major factor in developing the wedge-shaped Kurzheck tail of the 1970 917K which made the car much more stable than the original 1969 long version.

Battling with the works Ferrari 512s, and the other Porsche teams, the JWA Gulf-Porsche 917s, raced by Jo Siffert, Brian Redman, Leo Kinnunen, Pedro Rodríguez, Richard Attwood, Herbert Mueller and Derek Bell, earned seven out of Porsche's nine victories in the 10 races of the 1970 season, and five out of Porsche's eight victories in the 11 races of the 1971 season. During this period, the team's best result at Le Mans was second place in 1971. In fiction, a Gulf-Porsche 917K won in the cult Steve McQueen movie Le Mans, making the Gulf colours even more famous.

The rule that permitted 5-litre sports cars like the 917s had been limited to 1971, and the new weight limit for 3,000 cc prototypes was too high for the Porsche 908, removing the 908's advantage that balanced the lack of power of the air cooled 2-valve engine with low weight and good handling. As a result, Porsche left European style sportscar racing to privateers, and focussed on developing turboengines for the 917/10 Can-Am entry, as well as an already 9 year old car: the 911.

Wyer adopted the new 3.0-litre regulations and started building Gulf-Mirage prototypes again, using a Formula One Cosworth DFV engine. The successful F1-engine was considered unsuited for endurance racing as vibrations took their toll after several hours, so necessitating modifications. After three years of attempts, Jacky Ickx and Derek Bell achieved what would be Wyer's last win at Le Mans in 1975.

=== Retirement and death ===
The following year, John Wyer retired from automotive competition and sold his team to Harley Cluxton's Grand Touring Cars operation. He died in Scottsdale, Arizona, United States in 1989.
