= Hotel de France =

Hotel de France may refer to:

- Hotel de France (Le Mans / La Chartre sur le Loir), historic hotel in La Chartre Sur Le Loir, France
- Hotel de France (Conakry), in Conarky, Guinea, a.k.a. Grand Hotel de L'Independance
- Hôtel de France (film), French drama directed by Patrice Chéreau, 1987
