= Michael Lumsden =

Michael Lumsden may refer to:

- Michael Lumsden (actor) (born 1955), English TV and stage actor, known from The Archers
- John Michael G. Lumsden (1927–2012), better known as Jack Lumsden, British modern pentathlete
