= 1959 1000 km Nürburgring =

Sports car endurance race in Germany

The ADAC 1000 Kilometer Rennen took place on 7 June, on the Nürburgring Nordschleife, (West Germany). It was also the third round of the F.I.A. World Sports Car Championship.

Nürburgring Nordschleife

== Report ==
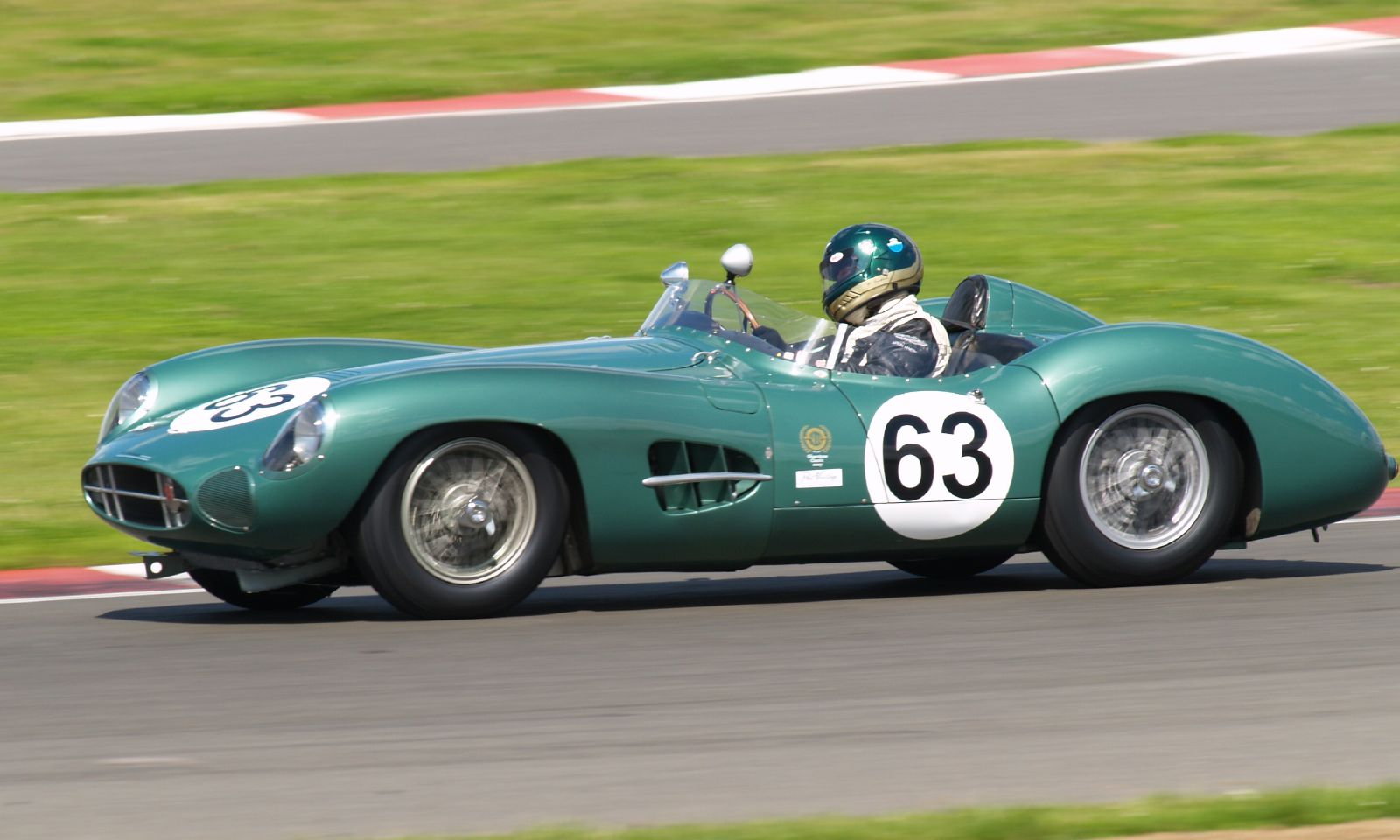
Aston Martin DBR1, similar to that driven by Moss and Fairman to victory

=== Entry ===
A massive total of 77 racing cars were registered for this event, of which 68 arrived for practice and started the long-distance race on the 14.174 mile German circuit. David Brown who had won the event in 1957 and again in 1958 sent along just one Aston Martin DBR1 over from England for Stirling Moss/Jack Fairman. As for championship leaders, Porsche, this was their home event and they arrived with two different cars; 356A and 718 RSK for their squad of drivers led by Wolfgang von Trips and Jo Bonnier.

Scuderia Ferrari would head the Italian challenge. Ferrari had three works 250 TR 59s in the Eifel mountains, Tony Brooks/Jean Behra, Phil Hill/Olivier Gendebien and Dan Gurney/Cliff Allison. They were joined by a fleet of privateer drivers in their Alfa Romeos, Porsche 356A Carreras Oscas and other mainline sportscars.

=== Qualifying ===
Qualifying was held over three sessions for a total of 1,710 minutes over the three days prior to the race. The Ferrari 250 TR of Behra took pole position, averaging a speed of 88.33 mph around the 14.173 mile circuit.

=== Race ===
With each lap over 14 miles in length, the race covered a total of 44 laps, or 1,000 miles, the Nordschleife was a fearsome thing to behold. A crowd of approximately 200,000 in attendance came to witness the race, despite a day of intermittent rain.

As for the race, victory went to the Aston Martin DBR1/300 of Moss and Fairman, gaining the marque their first points of the season, to win for the third time in a row. The victory was one of Moss's greatest drives, driving 41 of the 44 laps and having to make up for time lost while Fairman drove. The winning partnership, won in a time of 7hr 33:18.0 mins, averaging a speed of 89.204 mph. The margin of triumph over the Ferrari of Hill/Gendebein was 41secs., who were followed home by their team-mates Brooks/Behra who were 3min 27s adrift of the Aston. The first of the Porsches came home in fourth, with Umberto Maglioli/Hans Herrmann winning their class. Moss's pace was so quick that his fastest lap of the race, was faster than Behra's pole lap by over five seconds. The race continued for another hour to allow the other classes/division to try and complete the full 1000 km.

== Official Classification ==
Class Winners are in Bold text.

Pos	No	Class	Driver		Entrant	Chassis	Laps	Reason Out
1st	**1**	**S3.0**	(United Kingdom) **Stirling Moss**	(United Kingdom) **Jack Fairman**	**David Brown**	**Aston Martin DBR1/300**	**7hr 33:18.0, 44**	
2nd	4	S3.0	(United States) Phil Hill	(Belgium) Olivier Gendebien	Scuderia Ferrari	Ferrari 250 TR 59	7hr 33:59.0, 44	
3rd	3	S3.0	(United Kingdom) Tony Brooks	(France) Jean Behra	Scuderia Ferrari	Ferrari 250 TR 59	7hr 36:45.0, 44	
4th	**15**	**S2.0**	(Italy) **Umberto Maglioli**	(West Germany) **Hans Herrmann**	**Porsche KG**	**Porsche 718 RSK**	**7hr 40:57.0, 44**	
5th	5	S3.0	(United States) Dan Gurney	(United Kingdom) Cliff Allison	Scuderia Ferrari	Ferrari 250 TR 58	43	
6th	**34**	**S1.5**	(Switzerland) **Heini Walter**	(Switzerland) **Arthur Heuberger**	**Heini Walter**	**Porsche 718 RSK**	**42**	
7th	26	S1.5	(West Germany) Wolfgang von Trips	(Sweden) Jo Bonnier	Porsche KG	Porsche 718 RSK	41	
8th	10	S3.0	(Portugal) Mário Cabral	(Portugal) Joaquim Felipe Nogieira	Scuderia Centro Sud	Maserati 300S	41	
9th	**55**	**GT3.0**	(Belgium) **”Jean Beurlys”**	(Belgium) **”Blary”**	**Equipe Nationale Belge**	**Ferrari 250 GT LWB**	**40**	
10th	**67**	**GT1.6**	(West Germany) **Hans-Joachim Walter**	(West Germany) **Paul-Ernst Strähle**	**Hans-Joachim Walter**	**Porsche 356A Carrera**	**39**	
11th	68	GT1.6	(West Germany) Helmut Busch	(Brazil) Christian Heins	Dr. Helmut Busch	Porsche 356A Carrera	39	
12th	72	GT1.6	(West Germany) Siegfried Günther	(West Germany) Helmut Zick	Siegfried Günther	Porsche 356A Carrera	39	
13th	25	S2.0	(Mexico) Pedro Rodríguez	(United States) Leo Levine	Porsche KG	Porsche 356B Super 9	39	
14th	56	GT3.0	(Belgium) ”Eldé”	(Belgium) Lucien Bianchi	Equipe Nationale Belge	Ferrari 250 GT LWB	39	
15th	65	GT1.6	(United States) Emil Pardee	(United States) Peter Talbot	Emil B. Pardee	Porsche 356A Carrera	39	
16th	**43**	**S1.1**	**(United Kingdom) John Campbell-Jones**	**(United Kingdom) John Horride**	**John Campbell-Jones**	**Lotus-Climax Eleven**	**39**	
17th	24	S2.0	(West Germany) Herbert Linge	(Italy) Antonio Pucci	Porsche KG	Porsche 356A Carrera	39	
18th	77	GT1.6	(West Germany) Sepp Greger	(West Germany) Peter Ruby	Josef Greger	Porsche 356 Carrera	39	
DNF	11	S3.0	(United States) Rod Carveth	(United States) Gilbert Geitner	Rodney Carveth	Ferrari 250 TR 58	39	Accident
19th	61	GT3.0	(Switzerland) Peter Monteverdi	(Switzerland) Karl Stangl	Peter Monteverdi	Mercedes-Benz 300 SL	38	
20th	71	GT1.6	(West Germany) Gerhard Koch	(West Germany) Werner Lindermann	Gerhard Koch	Porsche 356 Carrera	38	
21st	78	GT1.6	(Belgium) Paul Frère	(Switzerland) Nadège Ferrier	Mme. Nadège Ferrier	Porsche 356 Carrera	38	
22nd	76	GT1.6	(West Germany) Frank Kalkuhl	(West Germany) Egon Evertz	Frank E. Kalkuhl	Porsche 356 Carrera	38	
23rd	**85**	**GT1.3**	(United Kingdom) **Peter Lumsden**	(United Kingdom) **Peter Riley**	**R.W. Fitzwilliam**	**Lotus Elite**	**38**	
24th	74	GT1.6	(West Germany) Hans Hartzheim	(West Germany) Heinz Hartzheim	Hans Hartzheim	Porsche 356A Carrera	38	
25th	92	GT1.3	(West Germany) Ewald Bandmann	(West Germany) Lothar Bender	Ewald Bandmann	Alfa Romeo Giulietta Veloce	37	
26th	93	GT1.3	(United States) Ron J. Vogt	(United States) David Rauch	Ron J. Vogt	Alfa Romeo Giulietta Veloce	37	
27th	94	GT1.3	(West Germany) Rudolf Wilhelm Moser	(West Germany) Heinz Friederichs	Heinz Friederichs	Alfa Romeo Giulietta Sprint Veloce Zagato	37	
28th	81	GT1.3	(West Germany) Wilfried Junge	(West Germany) Günther Schramm	Auto-Wax	Alfa Romeo Giulietta Veloce	37	
29th	29	S1.5	(United Kingdom) David Piper	(United Kingdom) Keith Grenne	David Piper	Lotus-Climax 15	36	
30th	87	GT1.3	(Belgium) Jacques Charlot	(Belgium) Gustave Gosselin	Jacques Charlot	Alfa Romeo Giulietta Veloce	36	
31st	**48**	**S750**	(France) **Gérard Laureau**	(France) **Paul Armagnac**	**Automobile Deutsch et Bonnet**	**D.B.-Panhard HBR4**	**36**	
32nd	89	GT1.3	(Belgium) André Pilette	(Belgium) André Liekens	Ecurie Francorchamps	Alfa Romeo Giulietta Sprint Veloce Zagato	36	
33rd	91	GT1.3	(Belgium) Georges Hacquin	(Belgium) Pierre Henriquet	Georges Hacquin	Alfa Romeo Giulietta Veloce	35	
34th	96	GT1.3	(United States) Warren B. King	(United States) William Linder	Warren B. King	Alfa Romeo Giulietta Veloce	35	
35th	75	GT1.6	(West Germany) Bruno Runte	(West Germany) Günther Selbach	Bruno Runte	Porsche 356 Carrera	35	
36th	73	GT1.6	(West Germany) Hellmuth Gerhards	(West Germany) Harald Gerhards	Hellmuth Gerhards	Porsche 356A	35	
37th	41	S1.1	(France) Jacques Lefebvre	(France) Walter Monaco	Jacques Lefebvre	Lotus-Climax Eleven	35	
DNF	27	S1.5	(West Germany) Wolfgang Seidel	(United States) Carroll Shelby	Wolfgang Seidel	Porsche 718 RSK	33	
38th	50	S750	(France) René Philippe Faure	(France) Duvillier	Stanguellini France	Stanguellini Efac SP6501	33	
39th	51	S750	(France) Georges Guyot	(France) Roger Gourdin	Stanguellini France	Stanguellini Efac SP6501	31	
40th	49	S750	(France) René Bartholoni	(France) Roger Masson	Automobile Deutsch et Bonnet	D.B.-Panhard HBR4	31	
NC	88	GT1.3	(Belgium) Georges Berger	(Belgium) Pascal Demol	Georges Berger	Alfa Romeo Giulietta Veloce		not classified
NC	63	GT3.0	(United States) Frank L. Ballard	(United States) Herbert L. Russell	Frank L. Ballard	Triumph TR3		not classified
DNF	14	S2.0	(East Germany) Edgar Barth	(Netherlands) Carel Godin de Beaufort	Porsche KG	Porsche 718 RSK	23	Engine
DNF	9	S3.0	(United Kingdom) Mike Taylor	(United Kingdom) Peter Blond	Brian Lister Engineering	Listen Costin-Jaguar	16	Accident
DISQ	46	S1.1	(United Kingdom) Peter Ashdown	(United Kingdom) Eric Broadley	Lola Equipe	Lola-Climax Mk.1	15	Loose body
DNF	2	S3.0	(United Kingdom) Graham Whitehead	(United Kingdom) Brian Naylor	Graham Whitehead	Aston Martin DBR1/300	14	Gear lever
DNF	80	GT1.3	(West Germany) Herbert Schultze	(West Germany) Eberhard Mahle	Auto-Wax	Alfa Romeo Giulietta Veloce	14	Brakes
DNF	6	S3.0	(United Kingdom) Ron Flockhart	(United Kingdom) Jock Lawrence	Ecurie Ecosse	Tojeiro-Jaguar	13	Suspension
DNF	16	S2.0	(Italy) Giulio Cabianca	(Italy) Giorgio Scarlatti	Scuderia Engeino Castellotti	Dino 196 S	9	Engine
DNF	83	GT1.3	(Switzerland) Edgar Berney	(Switzerland) Karl Foitek	Edgar Berney	Alfa Romeo Giulietta Veloce	9	Head gasket
DNF	19	S2.0	(United Kingdom) Christopher Martyn	(United Kingdom) Douglas Graham	Fitzwilliam Racing Team	MG A Twin Cam	9	
DNF	21	S2.0	(United Kingdom) Tim Parnell	(United Kingdom) David Buxton	Reg Parnell	Lotus-Climax 15	8	Broken chassis
DNF	42	S1.1	(Switzerland) Fausto Meyrat	(Switzerland) Stefan Brugger	Stefan Brugger	Auto Union RS1080	8	Fatal accident (Meyrat)
DNF	20	S2.0	(United Kingdom) Robin Carnegie	(United Kingdom) Bill de Selincourt	Fitzwilliam Racing Team	MG A Twin Cam	8	Head gasket
DNF	7	S3.0	(United States) Masten Gregory	(United Kingdom) Innes Ireland	Ecurie Ecosse	Lister-Jaguar Monza	5	Suspension
DNF	90	GT1.3	(Belgium) Paul Deetens	(Belgium) Annie Speers	Paul Deetens	Alfa Romeo Giulietta Veloce	2	
DNF	62	GT3.0	(West Germany) Rudi Goldener	(West Germany) Helmut Koegel	Rudi Goldener	Mercedes-Benz 190 SL	2	
DNF	44	S1.1	(United Kingdom) Bob Hicks	(United Kingdom) Christopher Power	R.J.W. Atley	Lotus-Climax Eleven	1	Accident
DNF	30	S1.5	(United Kingdom) Colin Davis	(Argentina) Alejandro de Tomaso	Alejandro de Tomaso	Osca FS 1500	1	Accident
DNF	66	GT1.6	(United Kingdom) Paul Fletcher	(United Kingdom) John Dashwood	Fitzwilliam Racing Team	MG A Twin Cam	1	Halfshaft
DNF	86	GT1.3	(Sweden) Jan Johnson	(Sweden) Erik Siegfasth	Jan Johnson	Alfa Romeo Giulietta Berlina	1	
DNF	52	S750	(France) Fernard Leroy	(France) Andre Bauder	Stanguellini France	Stanguellini Efac SP6501	1	
DNF	33	S1.5	(Belgium) Christian Goethals	(Belgium) Jean Romain	Christian Goethals	Porsche 550 RS	0	Engine
DNF	23	S2.0	(United States) James Cockrell	(West Germany) Harald von Saucken	James K. Cockrell	AC Ace	0	Accident
DNF	69	GT1.6	(West Germany) Horst Müllges	(West Germany) Hans-August Stausberg	Horst Müllges	Porsche 356A Super 75	0	
DNF	31	S1.5	(Argentina) Alejandro de Tomaso	(United States) Denise McCluggage	Alejandro de Tomaso	Osca FS 1500	0	Gearbox
DNS	8	S3.0	(Belgium) Lucien Bianchi	(Belgium) Alain de Changy	Ecurie Francorchamps	Ferrari 250 TR 58		
DNS	32	S1.5	(Netherlands) Carel Godin de Beaufort		Ecurie Maarsbergen	Porsche 718 RSK		
DNS	40	S1.1	(Italy) Paolo Martoglio	(Italy) Giorgio Cecchini	Stanguellini	Stanguellini HP13		
DNS	57	GT3.0	(Belgium) Willy Mairesse		Willy Mairesse	Ferrari 250 GT		
DNS	70	GT1.6	(Belgium) Emile-Claude Clemens	(Belgium) Paul Nokin	Emile-Claude Clemens	Porsche 356A Carrera		
DNS	82	GT1.3	(Sweden) Bertil Roos	(Netherlands) Rob Slotemaker	Hochet	Alfa Romeo Giulietta Veloce		
DNS	84	GT1.3	(Portugal) Francisco José Marques Pinto	(Portugal) Joaquim Correira de Oliveira	Francisco José Marques Pinto	Alfa Romeo Giulietta Spider		
DNS	95	GT1.3	(West Germany) Kurt Ahrens	(West Germany) Kurt Ahrens Jr.	Kurt Ahrens Sr.	Alfa Romeo Giulietta Sprint Veloce Zagato		
DNS	18T	S2.0	(Italy) Odoardo Govoni (United Kingdom) Stirling Moss	(Italy) Adolfo Tedeschi	San Giorgio	Maserati Tipo 60		practiced only

- Fastest Lap: Stirling Moss, 9:32.0secs (89.204 mph)

=== Class Winners ===
Class	Winners		
Sports 3000	1	Aston Martin DBR1/300	Moss / Fairman
Sports 2000	15	Porsche 718 RSK	Maglioli / Herrmann
Sports 1500	34	Porsche 718 RSK	Walter / Heuberger
Sports 1100	43	Lotus-Climax Eleven	Campbell-Jones / Horridge
Sports 750	48	D.B-Panhard HBR4	Laureau / Armagnac
Grand Touring 3000	55	Ferrari 250 GT LWB Berlinetta	“Beurlys” / “Blary”
Grand Touring 1600	67	Porsche 356A Carrera	Walter / Strähle
Grand Touring 1300	85	Lotus Elite	Lumsden / Riley

== Standings after the race ==
Pos	Championship	Points
1	(West Germany) Porsche	15
2	(Italy) Ferrari	14
3	(United Kingdom) Aston Martin	8
4	(Italy) Maserati	2
5	(Italy) Alfa Romeo	1

- Note: Only the top five positions are included in this set of standings.
  Championship points were awarded for the first six places in each race in the order of 8-6-4-3-2-1. Manufacturers were only awarded points for their highest finishing car with no points awarded for positions filled by additional cars. Only the best 3 results out of the 5 races could be retained by each manufacturer. Points earned but not counted towards the championship totals are listed within brackets in the above table.

World Sportscar Championship
Previous race: Targa Florio	1959 season	Next race: 24 Hours of Le Mans
