= Aston Martin DBR3 =

1958 racing car

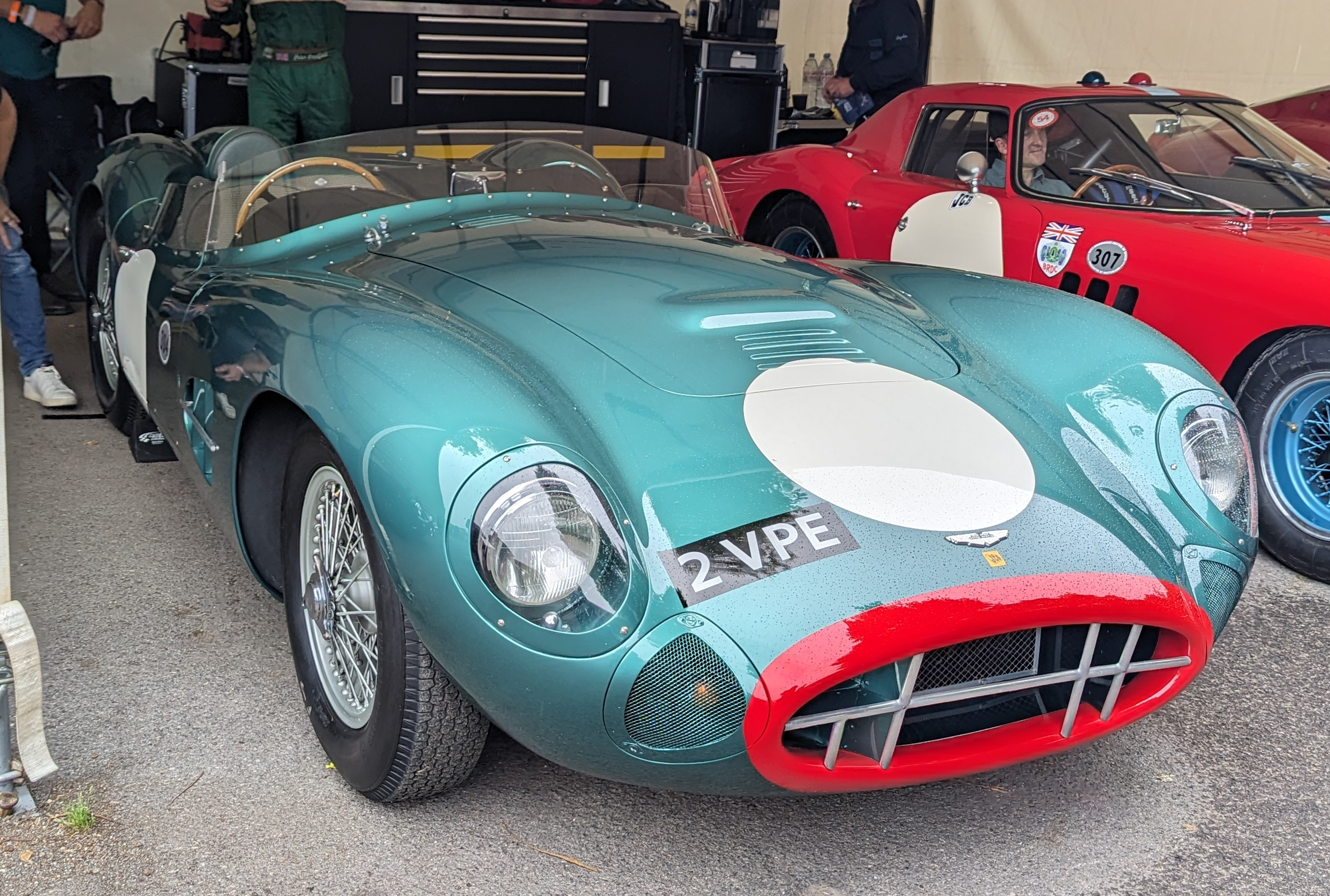
DBR3/1 on display at Goodwood Festival of Speed on 14 July 2023.

The Aston Martin DBR3 was a sports racing car built in 1958 as an alternative to the DBR1, using a different engine and front end setup. The car was very short lived and eventually converted into a DBR1.

== Design ==
The DBR3 was built from a DBR1 chassis and body but featured two major changes. First, the Lagonda based 2.9L Straight-6 was replaced by an engine based on that used in the newly released Aston Martin DB4 road car. While the DBR2 used this engine in its original 3.7L form, the DBR3 had the engine destroked to 3.0L (2990cc) in order to compete in the 3-Liter Sportscar category, just like DBR1.

The second difference between the two was that instead of the standard front suspension from DBR1, DBR3 used a new wishbone suspension that was being developed for the DBR4 Formula One car at the same time. It was believed this setup would be superior to the one used on DBR1 and DBR2.

Only one DBR3 chassis was built, known as DBR3/1.

== Racing history ==
The DBR3's racing history was very short; it appeared at only two races, competing in only one at Silverstone, and failing to finish. The new engine was proven to be unreliable and prone to overheating in comparison to the older familiar engine in the DBR1. Thus the decision was made to cancel the DBR3 and instead concentrate on the DBR1. DBR3/1 had its engine removed and the suspension was returned to a normal configuration, with the car being redesignated as DBR1/4 and racing on in this form in 1959.

The engine from DBR3 would later be placed in a DB4GT and raced in the 1959 24 Hours of Le Mans, although again with little success.
