= 1959 24 Hours of Le Mans =

27th 24 Hours of Le Mans endurance race

Previous: 1958	Next: 1960
Index: Races | Winners

The 1959 24 Hours of Le Mans was the 27th 24 Hours of Le Mans, Grand Prix of Endurance, and took place on 20 and 21 June 1959, on Circuit de la Sarthe. It was also the fourth round of the F.I.A. World Sports Car Championship. The prospect of an exciting duel between Ferrari, Aston Martin and giantkillers Porsche was enough to draw large crowds and some 150,000 spectators gathered for France's classic sports car race, around the 8.38-mile course.

Aston Martin finally achieved the coveted outright win, doing it with a 1-2 finish. The marque had first entered the Le Mans race in 1928, running every race since 1931 and had finished second three times and third twice before this victory.

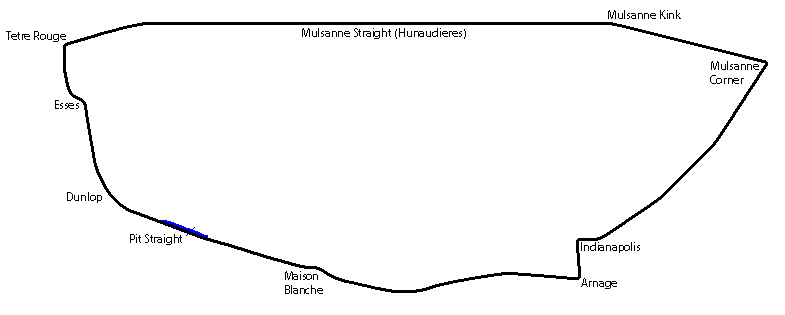
Le Mans in 1959

== Regulations ==
Significant changes occurred with the Automobile Club de l'Ouest (ACO) regulations this year. The FIA had issued its revamped and revised Appendix J rules for Grand Touring (GT) cars and the ACO followed other endurance races and opened its entry-list to the GT categories for the first time.

Each GT model had to have a minimum production run of 100 cars over 12 consecutive months. Those not meeting those requirements were put into the Sports Prototypes category. Both GT and SP ran to the same engine categories within their respective divisions.

The ACO also introduced a new competition to measure optimal car performance. The Index of Thermal Efficiency (Indice au Rendement Énergétique) took into account a car's weight, speed and fuel consumption (using standard 95/100-octane supplied fuel). Surprisingly, it did not include engine size in the calculation. This ran alongside the regular Index of Performance handicap competition, whose target distances were increased. Fuel, oil and water replenishment remained limited at a minimum of 30 laps between refills. Only two men, and a third as refueller, were allowed to work on a car in the pits, meaning the driver had to get out and behind the pit wall to not count against that total.

Regarding the track and organisation, the ACO installed IBM calculators to help with the administration. As well as considerable re-surfacing, a number of signalling lights were installed. Finally, acknowledging the huge influx of British spectators to the race, the ACO invited the racing magazine The Motor to send a journalist to provide race-commentary in English once an hour. This year the prize-money was £5000 for both the winners on distance and index of performance, and a total of over £30000.

== Entries ==
The increase in potential classes to 10 created a lot of interest with manufacturers and drivers and a total of 97 entries applied for the event. From this the ACO accepted 60 to practise, to qualify for the 54 starting places.

Category	Classes	Prototype entries	GT entries	Total entries
Large-engines	S-3000	14 (+1 reserve)	5	20
Medium-engines	S-2000 / S-1500	12 (+1 reserve)	9 (+1 reserve)	23
Small-engines	S-1100 / S-750	8 (+2 reserve)	6 (+1 reserve)	17
Total Cars		34 (+4 reserves)	20 (+2 reserves)	54 (+6 reserves)

This year there were seven manufacturer works teams, led by Ferrari and Aston Martin as well as Porsche, Lotus, DB, OSCA and Triumph. They were joined by the sports-car specialist Lister, Cooper and Stanguellini teams. It meant that half of the cars in the race were 'works' entries.

Defending champions Scuderia Ferrari brought their latest version of the Ferrari 250 TR. The chassis had been redesigned, made shorter and 77 kg lighter. The 3-litre V12 had a new 5-speed gearbox and now developed 306 bhp. Also, after six years Enzo Ferrari had finally relented and installed Dunlop disc brakes on the works cars. His squad of drivers included 1958 winners, Phil Hill/Olivier Gendebien, joined by Jean Behra/Dan Gurney and Hermano da Silva Ramos/Cliff Allison. There were also three 1958-models entered by private teams including the Equipe Nationale Belge and North American Racing Team.

A subsidiary team, Scuderia Eugenio Castellotti, was entrusted with a new prototype to take on the Porsches in the 2-litre division – the V6-engined Dino 196 S that produced 195 PS. It would be driven by Castellotti's close friend Giulio Cabianca with Giorgio Scarlatti.

As in the previous year, Aston Martin arrived with victory in the 1000km of Nürburgring with their DBR1/300. Led by director John Wyer and team manager Reg Parnell (himself a veteran of 7 Le Mans races in the early 1950s), they arrived at Le Sarthe with a very strong driver line-up to give themselves every chance of victory. The three works cars were driven by Nürburgring winners Stirling Moss/Jack Fairman alongside the F1 team driver Roy Salvadori with ex-chicken farmer, Texan Carroll Shelby, and Maurice Trintignant/Paul Frère. This year the cars were more streamlined and Moss and Fairman were given a more powerful 255 bhp engine to keep up with the Ferraris. Graham Whitehead again privately entered another DBR1. After the death of his half-brother Peter, he now had Brian Naylor as co-driver. In the GT category there was also a new DB4 GT (also using the DBR1 engine) entered by the Swiss Ecurie Trois Chevrons

With no Maseratis this year, the remaining five cars in the S-3000 category all had Jaguar-engines: Lister Engineering brought two of their new Frank Costin-designed cars (joined by Jaguar's former team manager, Lofty England), with another for the Equipe Nationale Belge, while the previously successful Ecurie Ecosse team this year entered both a Jaguar D-Type (for Masten Gregory and Innes Ireland) and a Tojeiro-Jaguar (for Ron Flockhart and Jock Lawrence).

After the very strong run to 3rd. 4th and 5th in the previous year, the Porsche 718 RSK was the car to beat in the 2.0 and 1.5-litre prototype classes. They had also just achieved their first outright Championship victory in May's Targa Florio, finishing 1-2-3-4. The two works cars were driven by regulars Hans Herrmann / Umberto Maglioli and new team-members Wolfgang von Trips / Jo Bonnier. Four Porsches made up the only entrants in the S-1500 class, the works car driven by Edgar Barth / Wolfgang Seidel alongside Dutch, French and American privateers.

Colin Chapman's Lotus team arrived in force, entering several classes: F1 team driver Graham Hill was paired with Australian Lotus-agent Derek Jolly in a new 2-litre Lotus 15, while the other team driver, Alan Stacey was in one of the two Lotus 17s in the 750cc class. Additionally, the team joined privateer Dickie Stoop in entering Lotus Elites in the new GT-1500 class.

The 2-litre Prototype class was very competitive with 8 strong entries. Up against the Porsches and Lotus and the new Ferrari, Cooper sent the new T49 'Monaco' (named after its first GP victory) driven by young works driver Bruce McLaren. Triumph returned to Le Mans with three TR3S cars, its driver line-up including 1956 race winner Ninian Sanderson. In the smallest Prototype classes, there was only a single DB in the 1100cc class, but the 750cc was to be contested by DB, OSCA, Lotus and Stanguellini. One of the works OSCAs was notable as it was driven by the Mexican Rodriguez brothers. Ricardo had been refused entry the previous year for being underage. This year he did compete, becoming the youngest ever driver to race at Le Mans, being only 17 years and four months old.

The new GT classes were well supported. The Ferrari 250 GT, in its various guises, was a tried and true racecar, winning since 1956. The V12 engine produced about 250 bhp. Four were in the entry list with only a single Swiss-entered Aston Martin DB4 GT competing against it in the GT-3000 class.

AC and MG each had a single car qualify in the GT-2000 class. After the non-appearance of the Squadra Virgilio Conrero Alfa Romeos, the Lotus Elite was the only model in the GT-1500 class with five entries. Having produced the required 100 units, DB was able to homologate the HBR-5 into the GT class, and four works cars were entered. Along with four privateers, it made DB the second biggest manufacturer present, after Ferrari. They were joined by the first appearance of Swedish manufacturer Saab looking to expand up its growing success in rallying.

== Practice ==
For the first time, the ACO was able to close the public roads in April which allowed a test day for teams to prepare their cars. Only 19 cars took up the opportunity to run for 6 1/2 hours, and it was Phil Hill in the new Ferrari that set the pace. Surprisingly, Cabianca in the 2-litre Dino was second fastest, ahead of the Aston Martins.

After scrutineering was held on the Monday and Tuesday, nine hours of qualifying were held over two sessions on the Wednesday and Thursday. Again the Ferraris were fastest and this time it was debutante Dan Gurney putting in the best time of 4:03.3. However Jean Behra had a major argument with team manager Romolo Tavoni who had imposed a 7500rpm rev-limit on the cars, limiting top performance, to protect the engines. Moss recorded 4:10.8, Hansgen's Jaguar 4:12.2 and Graham Hill put in a competitive time of 4:20 in the 2-litre Lotus.

Some of the lap-times recorded during practice were:

Class	Car	Driver(s)	Best time
S-3000	Ferrari 250 TR/59 #12	Gurney	4m 03.3sec
S-3000	Ferrari 250 TR/59 #15	Allison	4m 03.6sec
S-3000	Ferrari 250 TR/59 #14	P.Hill	4m 04.7sec
S-3000	Jaguar D-Type #3	Gregory	4min 09.7sec
S-3000	Aston Martin DBR1/300 #2	Moss	4min 10.8sec
S-3000	Aston Martin DBR1/300 #5	Salvadori	4min 12sec
S-3000	Lister Sport #2	Hansgen	4min 12.2sec
S-2000	Cooper T49 Monaco #24	Russell	4min 13.6sec
S-3000	Aston Martin DBR1/300 #6	Trintignant	4min 14.8sec
S-2000	Lotus 15 LM #30	G.Hill	4min 20sec
S-1500	Porsche 718 RSK #36	de Beaufort	4min 20.6sec
S-2000	Triumph #30	Sanderson	4min 49.8sec
S-750	Lotus 17 LM #53	Stacey	5min 11.4sec
S-750	Lotus 17 LM #54	Taylor	5min 16.4sec
S-750	D.B. HBR-5 Spyder #50	de Tomaso	5min 18.1sec
S-1100	D.B. HBR-5 GTS-Coupé #49	Masson	5min 18.9sec

Both the Whitehead Aston Martin and the Tojeiro had major problems and needed parts urgently flown in before the race.

After practice, Dickie Stoop's Lotus Elite was in a traffic accident driving back to its garage in the town and was too badly damaged to be ready for the race-start the body having been all but destroyed.

== Race ==
=== Start ===
Saturday started with heavy rain, but by 4pm it was dry and very hot. Yet again, Stirling Moss was first away. Parnell had given him team orders to act as the 'hare' and to bait the Ferraris into a race-pace that would break them - a role he relished. (This is contradicted by the transcription of Parnells's race briefing published by Moss). Meanwhile, Behra stalled his Ferrari twice on the line and was 15th at the end of the first lap. He subsequently put in some blistering lap-times (setting a new 3-litre lap record) to get back up to 3rd by the end of the first hour. Setting the fastest lap of the race, he then powered his way into the lead passing Moss on the Mulsanne straight around 5.15pm on the 17th lap. Still furious with the team management he hammered the engine at all costs (at one time getting up to 9500rpm on the Mulsanne straight) to prove his point. At the time of the first driver changes on the 30th lap, the car needed a lot of water and suffered from overheating thereafter.

Surprisingly, there was not a single retirement in the first hour (although Lund was delayed after his MG hit a dog at Mulsanne corner). Moss still led from the works Ferraris of Hill, Behra and Allison, then the two Ecosse cars (Jaguar ahead of Tojeiro) and Graham Hill in the remarkable Lotus 15 leading the 2-litre class in 7th. The other Aston Martins were 8th and 9th biding their time, ahead of the two Listers, while the Dino was 13th overall ahead of the Porsches in the 2-litre class.

By 7pm, after three hours, the Behra/Gurney Ferrari had a 40-second lead over the Moss/Fairman Aston Martin. They had a lap's lead over the rest of the field: leading the pack in third was the Hill/Gendebien Ferrari, then the Gregory/Ireland Ecosse Jaguar and the Salvadori/Shelby Aston Martin. The Allison/Ramos works Ferrari had just retired with a blown head gasket and soon after the Hill/Gendebien car was delayed by engine trouble dropping them to 8th. The Hill/Jolly Lotus that had started so well had been stymied by gearbox issues, and would eventually retire during the night. The Dino briefly took over leading until fuel issues started, leaving the Porsches to take up the 2-litre class lead.

=== Night ===
It was at dusk, in the fifth hour, that the first major accident occurred: Brian Naylor hit oil and rolled the Whitehead Aston Martin at Maison Blanche. Naylor got out, but the car was then heavily struck by Jim Russell in the Cooper Monaco (running 9th) and then Faure's Stanguellini hit the Cooper's fuel tank. Both smaller cars went up in flames and although Russell had a broken leg and ribs from the initial collision both drivers got away with only minor burns.

The Ecurie Ecosse team was still a competitive force, and by 9pm their Jaguar was running second and the Tojeiro in 4th. But as night fell the pace started taking its toll – around 10pm, on the 70th lap, both the Ireland/Gregory Jaguar running second and the Moss/Fairman Aston Martin in third were put out with engine problems. Innes Ireland had a big moment when the connecting rod broke dropping oil all over his rear tyres and sending him into a big spin in the pitch darkness. And when Behra's Ferrari was called into the pits by officials to fix malfunctioning lights suddenly the Salvadori/Shelby Aston Martin found itself in the lead. Behra and Gurney had slipped to second and the other works Aston Martin in third. Then came the remaining Lister, Hill's Ferrari, the Ecosse Tojeiro and then three Porsches with Bonnier/von Trips leading the 2-litre classes. The Stacey/Greene Lotus headed the Index of Performance.

However, within hours though the Lister and the Tojeiro were out: the Bueb/Halford Lister succumbed to engine issues, then the 'Toj' started leaking fluids long before its replenishment point. Inevitably the engine soon seized and the last Jaguar engine was gone. By midnight over half the field had retired. Aston led Gurney's ailing Ferrari, Aston, Ferrari then the Bonnier Porsche. Behra's engine finally let go just before 2am when he had slipped back to fourth.

Meanwhile, Phil Hill had hunted down the leaders and soon after 2am the Aston Martin lost ten minutes when Salvadori pitted with major vibrations in the suspension. Fearing transmission issues, the team was relieved to instead find that it was a destroyed tyre tread lodged up in the wheel-well. The Hill/Gendebien Ferrari finally hit the front – its engine issues resolved when the water levels dropped – and together they set about building a solid lead through the night. By 4am, the halfway mark, that lead was two laps. They were, however, now the sole Testarossa running as the three privateer cars had all retired during the evening. The other Aston Martin was third and the works Porsche 4th (and leading the Performance Index), 4 and 7 laps respectively behind the Ferrari.

=== Morning ===
As the sun rose (for once without the thick rolling fog) the S-750 class Stacey/Greene Lotus had risen to 14th, leading the Index of Performance by a big margin, when it was stopped by the same distributor issues that had halted its teammate. The Lotus 17 was the fastest 750cc ever raced at Le Mans, but still fragile.

By 6am the field down to only 23 runners. The Ferrari was leading the two remaining Aston Martins and pulling away. Incredibly, with no other S-3000 class cars left running, four Porsches held down the next places. Then came the four more-powerful Ferrari GTs, headed by the Belgian car of "Beurlys" / "Eldé". But then it started going wrong for Porsche. First, the leading works car of von Trips/Bonnier, running 4th, was stopped by clutch problems. Soon afterward the works 1500cc car lost its gearbox. The Dutch Ecurie Maarsbergen car inherited 4th place for two hours until it too broke its engine. This left Hugus/Erickson, the American privateers, promoted to 4th still pursued by four Ferraris with the older, French, 550A in 9th.

Drama happened soon after 11am when Gendebien pitted the leading Ferrari with major overheating problems. It had been leading for over 9 hours and had a healthy 3-lap lead but it was well ahead of its next fluid-refill pit-window. The team improvised to cool the engine and Gendebien did slow laps to try and make it to his pit window, but to no avail – after two more laps, and just before noon, the engine seized and the last Ferrari hope was gone. Around the same time the last two Porsches retired with engine problems.

With the last Ferrari retired and now holding a comfortable lead, Parnell the Aston Martin team manager, ordered his two cars to hold station and ease off to protect their engines for the last four hours. Where Moss had at the start been doing laps of 4m01s and the other cars were set a target of 4m20s, Salvadori now dropped back down to 4m50s This was prudent as the lead car was starting to go through oil at a rate. However, with no pressure from the other teams the two cars were able to cruise to the finish.

The three Triumphs had had a mixed race: two had been eliminated early when both had cooling-fan blades break off and go through the radiator. The third (raced by Stoop/Jopp) had been called in as a precaution and had its fan removed then had moved up steadily through the field. It had got up to 7th overall by the 23rd hour when the oil pump broke forcing a late retirement. Perhaps the unluckiest drivers were the privateer DB team of Bartholoni/Jaeger who had battled and survived clutch problems through the whole race only for it to break completely with mere minutes to run.

=== Finish and post-race ===
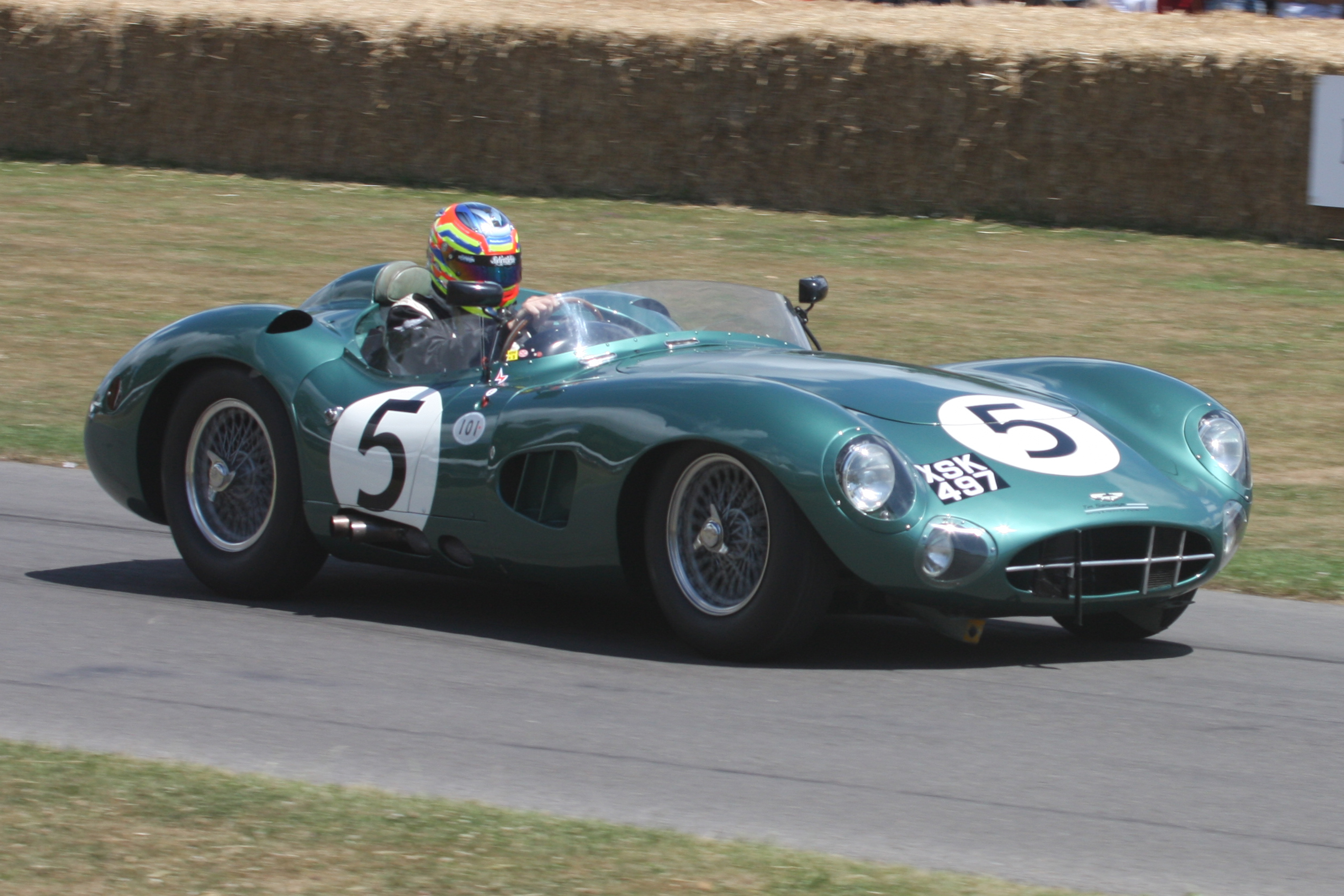
The winning Aston Martin DBR1 of Roy Salvadori and Carroll Shelby.

In the end Shelby brought his car home a lap ahead of Trintignant in a formation finish. All during the race the Texan had been battling a bout of dysentery. He had even driven with a nitroglycerine capsule under his tongue in case he had heart problems (which he omitted from telling his team). Shortly after the race, he would collapse and sleep for hours. Salvadori drove the majority of the race, doing 14 hours, though he also was getting over flu. Trintignant was also suffering: his right foot had been burned by the overheating throttle pedal.

Such was the eventual domination of Aston Martin, the third car home was fully 26 laps behind the winners. That car was the first GT home, the Ferrari 250 GT LWB of "Beurlys" and "Eldé". Yet again the Equipe Nationale Belge had achieved a podium finish. In fact all the Ferrari GTs finished with the Belgians leading home the NART car and the two French privateers. In 7th was the Rudd Racing AC Ace – the sole 2-litre finisher – followed by the first Lotus Elite and a works DB. The little French car had not even been able to overtake the lap distance of the Hill/Gendebien Ferrari retired 4 hours earlier. In a race of attrition only 13 cars out of the 54 starters were able to complete the race.

It was Aston Martin's finest hour: as well as the 1-2 outright finish, the team also reached the podium in all three competitions. Managing Director David Brown had got changed into his 'Sunday best' and in his joy jumped about the winning car for its victory lap. After winning the Tourist Trophy round later in the year, Aston Martin clinched the World Constructors Championship and Brown withdrew the company from motorsport (including its unsuccessful venture into Formula 1).

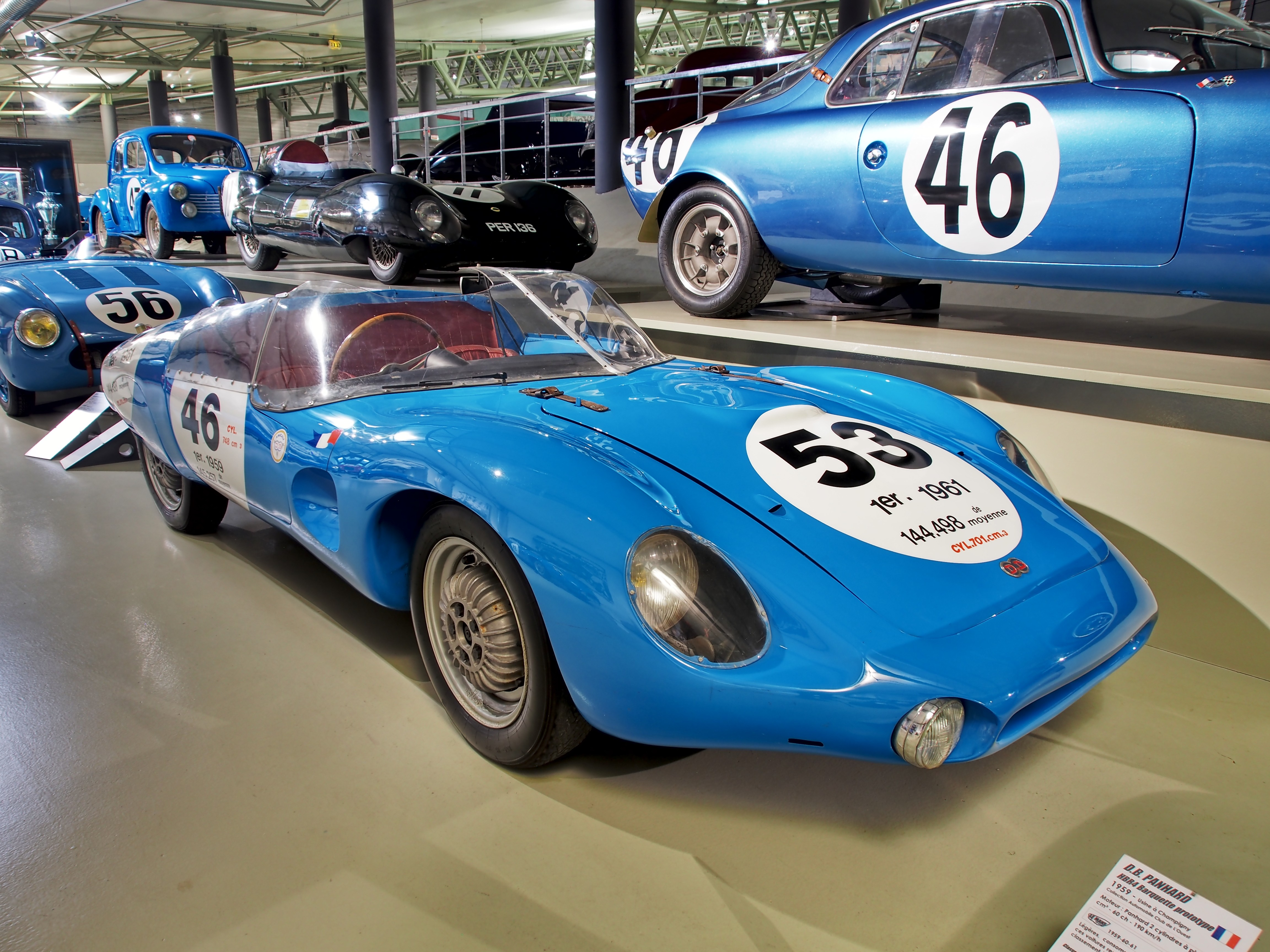
The DB Panhard of Cotton and Cornet, which won the GT750 class and the Index of Performance.

After several lean years, DB returned to the winners' rostrums when it cleaned up the other trophies. The team won the lucrative Index of Performance, the new Index of Thermal Efficiency (by the Armagnac/Consten car doing 25.7 mpg_{‑imp} (11.0 L/100 km; 21.4 mpg_{‑US})), and the Biennial Cup for good measure, as well as the GT-750 class win. In contrast the winning Aston Martin only managed to do 10 mpg and even the Porsches could only manage 12 mpg. Perhaps the unluckiest drivers were the privateer DB team of Bartholoni/Jaeger who had battled and survived clutch problems through the whole race only for it to break completely with mere minutes to run.

In a remarkable turn of fortune to the previous year, this was Porsche's worst performance to date with none of their cars, works or privateer, finishing. 'Lino' Fayen, who finished 6th in his Ferrari GT had fled France to Venezuela to evade paying debts. He was subsequently arrested while celebrating his finish.

After a number of bust-ups with the Ferrari management, this was Jean Behra's last race for the team. The talented Frenchman was fired but then tragically killed just a fortnight later. He was racing his own Porsche in a sportscar race as a prelude for the German Grand Prix being held that year at the dangerous AVUS circuit near Berlin. It was also one of the last races for double-Le Mans winner Ivor Bueb who was killed two months later in a non-Championship F1 race at Clermont-Ferrand.

== Official results ==
=== Finishers ===
Results taken from Quentin Spurring's book, officially licensed by the ACO Class winners are in bold text.

Pos	Class	No	Team	Drivers	Chassis	Engine	Laps
1	**S3.0**	**5**	(United Kingdom) **David Brown Racing Dept**	(United Kingdom) **Roy Salvadori** (United States) **Carroll Shelby**	Aston Martin DBR1/300	Aston Martin 3.0L S6	323
2	S3.0	6	(United Kingdom) David Brown Racing Dept	(France) Maurice Trintignant (Belgium) Paul Frère	Aston Martin DBR1/300	Aston Martin 3.0L S6	322
3	**GT3.0**	**11**	(Belgium) **Equipe Nationale Belge**	(Belgium) **"Beurlys"** (Jean Blaton) (Belgium) **"Eldé"** (Leon Dernier)	Ferrari 250 GT LWB	Ferrari 3.0L V12	297
4	GT3.0	18	(United States) North American Racing Team	(United States) George Arents (Belgium) André Pilette	Ferrari 250 GT LWB	Ferrari 3.0L V12	296
5	GT3.0	16	(France) F. Tavano (private entrant)	(France) Fernand Tavano (United States) Bob Grossman	Ferrari 250 GT California	Ferrari 3.0L V12	294
6	GT3.0	20	(France) / (Venezuela) L. Fayen (private entrant)	(France) Lino Fayen (Italy) Gino Munaron	Ferrari 250 GT LWB	Ferrari 3.0L V12	293
7	**GT2.0**	**29**	(United Kingdom) **Rudd Racing**	(United Kingdom) **Ted Whiteaway** (United Kingdom) **John Turner**	AC Ace	Bristol 1971cc S6	273
8	**GT1.5**	**41**	(United Kingdom) **W.S. Frost** (private entrant)	(United Kingdom) **Peter Lumsden** (United Kingdom) **Peter Riley**	Lotus Elite	Coventry Climax FWE 1216cc S4	270
9	**GT750**	**46**	(France) Automobiles; Deutsch et Bonnet	(France) **René Cotton** (France) **Louis Cornet**	D.B. HBR-5 Spyder	Panhard 745cc F2	258
10	GT1.5	42	(United Kingdom) Border Reivers	(United Kingdom) John Whitmore (United Kingdom) Jim Clark	Lotus Elite	Coventry Climax FWE 1216cc S4	257
11	GT750	45	(France) Automobiles; Deutsch et Bonnet	(France) Paul Armagnac (France) Bernard Consten	D.B. HBR-5 Spyder	Panhard 745cc F2	247
12	GT750	44	(Sweden) S. Nottorp (private entrant)	(Sweden) Sture Nottorp (Sweden) Gunnar Bengtsson	Saab 93 Sport GT 750	Saab 748cc S3 (2-Stroke)	232
13 N/C *	S750	55	(Italy) Automobili Stanguellini	(France) Roger Delageneste (France) Paul Guiraud	Stanguellini 750 Sport	Fiat 741cc S4	220

- Note *: Not classified because car failed to complete 70% of winner's distance (226 laps). However, Spurring and Moity list them as a finisher.

=== Did not finish ===
Pos	Class	No	Team	Drivers	Chassis	Engine	Laps	Reason
DNF	S3.0	14	(Italy) Scuderia Ferrari	(Belgium) Olivier Gendebien (United States) Phil Hill	Ferrari 250 TR/59	Ferrari 3.0L V12	263	Overheating (20hr)
DNF	GT2.0	25	(United Kingdom) Standard Triumph Ltd	(United Kingdom) Richard "Dickie" Stoop (United Kingdom) Peter Jopp	Triumph TR3S	Triumph 1984cc S4	245	Oil pump (23hr)
DNF	S1.5	37	(United States) E. Hugus (private entrant)	(United States) Ed Hugus (United States) Ray "Ernie" Erickson	Porsche 718 RSK	Porsche 1498cc F4	240	Engine (20hr)
DNF	S1.5	35	(France) J. Kerguen (private entrant)	(France) Jean Kerguen (Morocco) Robert La Caze	Porsche 550A	Porsche 1498cc F4	229	Clutch (20hr)
DNF	S1.5	36	(Netherlands) Ecurie Maarsbergen	(Netherlands) Carel Godin de Beaufort (Brazil) Christian 'Bino' Heins	Porsche 718 RSK	Porsche 1498cc F4	186	Engine (15hr)
DNF	GT2.0	33	(United Kingdom) F.W.R. Lund (private entrant)	(United Kingdom) Ted Lund (United Kingdom) Colin Escott	MG A Twin Cam	BMC 1588cc S4	185	Gearbox (21hr)
DNF	S2.0	31	(West Germany) Porsche KG	(West Germany) Wolfgang von Trips (Sweden) Joakim 'Jo' Bonnier	Porsche 718 RSK	Porsche 1587cc F4	182	Clutch (14hr)
DNF	S1.1	49	(France) R. Masson (private entrant)	(France) Roger Masson (France) Jean Vinatier	D.B. HBR-5 GTS-Coupé	Panhard 851cc F2	179	Clutch (23hr)
DNF	S750	48	(France) Automobiles; Deutsch et Bonnet	(France) René Bartholoni (France) François Jaeger	D.B. HBR-5 Coupé	Panhard 745cc F2	169	Clutch (24hr)
DNF	S1.5	34	(West Germany) Porsche KG	(East Germany) Edgar Barth (West Germany) Wolfgang Seidel	Porsche 718 RSK	Porsche 1498cc F4	168	Gearbox (14hr)
DNF	S750	53	(United Kingdom) Team Lotus Engineering	(United Kingdom) Alan Stacey (United Kingdom) Keith Greene	Lotus 17 LM	Coventry Climax; FWMA 742cc S4	156	Head gasket (14hr)
DNF	S3.0	8	(United Kingdom) Ecurie Ecosse	(United Kingdom) Ron Flockhart (United Kingdom) John 'Jock' Lawrence	Tojeiro	Jaguar 3.0L S6	137	Overheating (12hr)
DNF	S3.0	12	(Italy) Scuderia Ferrari	(France) Jean Behra (United States) Dan Gurney	Ferrari 250 TR/59	Ferrari 3.0L V12	129	Engine (10hr)
DNF	S3.0	1	(United Kingdom) Brian Lister Engineering	(United Kingdom) Ivor Bueb (United Kingdom) Bruce Halford	Lister Sport	Jaguar 3.0L S6	121	Engine (9hr)
DNF	S2.0	30	(United Kingdom) Team Lotus Engineering	(United Kingdom) Graham Hill (Australia) Derek Jolly	Lotus 15 LM	Coventry Climax; 1963cc S4	119	Engine (10hr)
DNF	GT2.0	27	(United Kingdom) Standard Triumph Ltd	(United Kingdom) Ninian Sanderson (Belgium) Claude Dubois	Triumph TR3S	Triumph 1984cc S4	114	Radiator (10hr)
DNF	S3.0	19	(United States) E. D. Martin (private entrant)	(United States) Edwin 'Ed' Martin (United States) Bill Kimberly	Ferrari 250 TR/58	Ferrari 3.0L V12	108	Gearbox (11hr)
DNF	GT1.5	38	(France) Equipe Los Amigos	(France) Jean-Claude Vidilles (France) Jean-François Malle	Lotus Elite	Coventry Climax; FWE 1216cc S4	105	Engine / fire (10hr)
DNF	S750	52	(Italy) Automobili OSCA	(France) Jean Laroche (Monaco) André Testut	O.S.C.A. 750S	OSCA 742cc S4	88	Gearbox (9hr)
DNF	S2.0	24	(United Kingdom) Cooper Car Company	(United Kingdom) Jim Russell (New Zealand) Bruce McLaren	Cooper T49 'Monaco'	Coventry Climax; FPF 1964cc S4	79	Accident (6hr)
DNF	S2.0	32	(West Germany) Porsche KG	(West Germany) Hans Herrmann (Italy) Umberto Maglioli	Porsche 718 RSK	Porsche 1587cc F4	78	Ignition (6hr)
DNF	S3.0	4	(United Kingdom) David Brown Racing Dept.	(United Kingdom) Stirling Moss (United Kingdom) Jack Fairman	Aston Martin DBR1/300	Aston Martin 3.0L I6	70	Engine (6hr)
DNF	S3.0	3	(United Kingdom) Ecurie Ecosse	(United Kingdom) Innes Ireland (United States) Masten Gregory	Jaguar D-Type	Jaguar 3.0L S6	70	Engine (7hr)
DNF	GT750	50	(Argentina) A. de Tomaso (private entrant)	(Argentina) Alejandro de Tomaso (United Kingdom) Colin Davis	D.B. HBR-5 Spyder	Panhard 745cc F2	63	Gearbox (9hr)
DNF	S2.0	23	(Italy) Scuderia Ferrari	(Italy) Giorgio Scarlatti (Italy) Giulio Cabianca	Dino 196 S	Ferrari 1984cc V6	63	Out of fuel (6hr)
DNF	S750	62 (reserve)	(France) Société E.F.A.C.	(France) René-Philippe Faure (France) Georges Guyot	Stanguellini EFAC 750 Sport	Fiat 741cc S4	58	Accident (5hr)
DNF	GT1.1	59 (reserve)	(France) J. Faucher (private entrant)	(France) Jacques Faucher (France) Gérard Leffargue	D.B. HBR-5 Super Rallye	Panhard 851cc F2	53	Engine (6hr)
DNF	S3.0	7	(United Kingdom) A.G. Whitehead (private entrant)	(United Kingdom) Graham Whitehead (United Kingdom) Brian Naylor	Aston Martin DBR1/300	Aston Martin 3.0L S6	52	Accident (5hr)
DNF	S3.0	2	(United Kingdom) Brian Lister Engineering	(United States) Walt Hansgen (United Kingdom) Peter Blond	Lister Sport	Jaguar 3.0L S6	52	Engine (5hr)
DNF	S3.0	10	(Belgium) Equipe Nationale Belge	(Belgium) Lucien Bianchi (Belgium) Alain de Changy	Ferrari 250 TR/58	Ferrari 3.0L V12	47	Engine (5hr)
DNF	S3.0	15	(Italy) Scuderia Ferrari	(United Kingdom) Cliff Allison (Brazil) Hermano da Silva Ramos	Ferrari 250 TR/59	Ferrari 3.0L V12	41	Engine (4hr)
DNF	S750	56	(Italy) Automobili Stanguellini	(France) René-Louis Revillon (France) Joseph Dieu	Stanguellini 750 Sport	Fiat 741cc S4	37	Out of fuel (6hr)
DNF	GT750	43	(United Kingdom) S.A. Hurrell (private entrant)	(United Kingdom) Sid Hurrell (United Kingdom) Roy North	Saab 93 Sport GT 750	Saab 748cc S3 (2-Stroke)	35	Engine (5hr)
DNF	GT2.0	26	(United Kingdom) Standard Triumph Ltd	(United Kingdom) Peter Bolton (United States) Mike Rothschild	Triumph TR3S	Triumph 1984cc S4	35	Radiator (4hr)
DNF	S750	51	(Italy) Automobili OSCA	(Mexico) Pedro Rodríguez (Mexico) Ricardo Rodríguez	O.S.C.A. 750S	OSCA 749cc S4	32	Water pump (5hr)
DNF	GT2.0	60 (reserve)	(United Kingdom) J. Dashwood (private entrant)	(United Kingdom) John Dashwood (United Kingdom) William Wilks	Fraser Nash Le Mans Coupé	Bristol 1971cc S6	30	Accident (5hr)
DNF	S750	54	(United Kingdom) Team Lotus Engineering	(United Kingdom) Mike Taylor (United Kingdom) Jonathan Sieff	Lotus 17 LM	Coventry Climax; FWMA 742cc S4	23	Ignition (5hr)
DNF	GT3.0	21	(Switzerland) Écurie Trois Chevrons	(Switzerland) Hubert Patthey (Switzerland) Renaud Calderari	Aston Martin DB4 GT	Aston Martin 3.0L S6	21	Engine (3hr)
DNF	S3.0	17	(United States) North American Racing Team	(United States) Rod Carveth (United States) Gil Geitner	Ferrari 250 TR/58	Ferrari 3.0L V12	21	Gearbox (3hr)
DNF	GT750	47	(France) Automobiles; Deutsch et Bonnet	(France) Gérard Laureau (France) Pierre Chancel	D.B. HBR-5 Coupé	Panhard 745cc F2	9	Engine (3hr)

=== Did not start ===
Pos	Class	No	Team	Drivers	Chassis	Engine	Reason
DNS	GT1.5	58 (reserve)	(United Kingdom) J.R. Stoop (private entrant)	(United Kingdom) Douglas Graham (United Kingdom) Mike McKee	Lotus Elite	Coventry Climax FWE 1216cc S4	Road accident
DNA	S3.0	9	(Belgium) Equipe Nationale Belge	(Belgium) Lucien Bianchi (Belgium) Mauro Bianchi (Belgium) Jacques Croisier	Lister Sport	Jaguar 3.0L S6	Withdrawn
DNA	GT2.0	28	(Belgium) Equipe Nationale Belge	(Belgium) André Pilette (Belgium) Armand Blaton	AC Ace	Bristol 1971cc S6	Withdrawn
DNA	GT1.5	39	(Italy) Squadra Virgilio Conrero		Alfa Romeo Giulietta SV	Alfa Romeo 1290cc S4	Withdrawn
DNA	GT1.5	40	(Italy) Squadra Virgilio Conrero	(France) José Rosinski (France) Claude Bobrowski	Alfa Romeo Giulietta SV	Alfa Romeo 1290cc S4	Withdrawn
DNA	GT1.5	57	(United Kingdom) Team Lotus Engineering	(United Kingdom) Colin Chapman	Lotus Elite	Coventry Climax FWE 1216cc S4	Withdrawn

=== Class winners ===
Class	Winners	
Sports 3000	#5 Aston Martin DBR1/300	Salvadori / Shelby
Sports 2000	No finishers	
Sports 1500	No finishers	
Sports 1100	No finishers	
Sports 750	No classified finishers	
Grand Touring 5000	No finishers	
Grand Touring 3000	#11 Ferrari 250 GT LWB	"Beurlys" / "Eldé"
Grand Touring 2000	#29 AC Ace	Whiteaway / Turner
Grand Touring 1500	#41 Lotus Elite	Lumsden / Riley
Grand Touring 1100	No finishers	
Grand Touring 750	#46 D.B. HBR-5 Spyder	Cornet / Cotton

=== Index of performance ===
Pos	Class	No	Team	Drivers	Chassis	Score
1	GT750	46	(France) Automobiles; Deutsch et Bonnet	(France) René Cotton (France) Louis Cornet	D.B. HBR-5 Spyder	1.210
2	S3.0	5	(United Kingdom) David Brown Racing Dept	(United Kingdom) Roy Salvadori (United States) Carroll Shelby	Aston Martin DBR1/300	1.181
3	S3.0	6	(United Kingdom) David Brown Racing Dept	(France) Maurice Trintignant (Belgium) Paul Frère	Aston Martin DBR1/300	1.178
4	GT750	45	(France) Automobiles; Deutsch et Bonnet	(France) Paul Armagnac (France) Bernard Consten	D.B. HBR-5 Spyder	1.158
5	GT1.5	41	(United Kingdom) W.S. Frost	(United Kingdom) Peter Lumsden (United Kingdom) Peter Riley	Lotus Elite	1.113
6	GT3.0	11	(Belgium) Equipe Nationale Belge	(Belgium) "Beurlys" (Jean Blaton) (Belgium) "Eldé" (Leon Dernier)	Ferrari 250 GT LWB	1.088
7	GT3.0	18	(United States) North American Racing Team	(United States) George Arents (Belgium) André Pilette	Ferrari 250 GT SWB	1.085
8	GT750	44	(Sweden) S. Nottorp	(Sweden) Sture Nottorp (Sweden) Gunnar Bengtsson	Saab 93 Sport GT 750	1.085
9	GT3.0	16	(France) F. Tavano	(France) Fernand Tavano (United States) Bob Grossman	Ferrari 250 GT California	1.078
10	GT3.0	20	(France) / (Venezuela) L. Fayen	(France) Lino Fayen (Italy) Gino Munaron	Ferrari 250 GT LWB	1.075

- Note: Only the top ten positions are included in this set of standings. A score of 1.00 means meeting the minimum distance for the car, and a higher score is exceeding the nominal target distance.

=== Index of Thermal Efficiency ===
Pos	Class	No	Team	Drivers	Chassis	Score
1	GT750	45	(France) Automobiles; Deutsch et Bonnet	(France) Paul Armagnac (France) Bernard Consten	D.B. HBR-5 Spyder	1.339
2	GT1.5	41	(United Kingdom) W.S. Frost	(United Kingdom) Peter Lumsden (United Kingdom) Peter Riley	Lotus Elite	1.243
3	S3.0	5	(United Kingdom) David Brown Racing Dept	(United Kingdom) Roy Salvadori (United States) Carroll Shelby	Aston Martin DBR1/300	1.226
4	S3.0	6	(United Kingdom) David Brown Racing Dept	(France) Maurice Trintignant (Belgium) Paul Frère	Aston Martin DBR1/300	1.218
5	GT1.5	42	(United Kingdom) Border Reivers	(United Kingdom) John Whitmore (United Kingdom) Jim Clark	Lotus Elite	1.124
6	GT2.0	29	(United Kingdom) Rudd Racing	(United Kingdom) Ted Whiteaway (United Kingdom) John Turner	AC Ace	1.123
7	GT750	46	(France) Automobiles; Deutsch et Bonnet	(France) René Cotton (France) Louis Cornet	D.B. HBR-5 Spyder	1.110

=== 25th Rudge-Whitworth Biennial Cup (1958/1959) ===
Pos	Class	No	Team	Drivers	Chassis	Score
1	GT750	46	(France) Automobiles; Deutsch et Bonnet	(France) René Cotton (France) Louis Cornet	D.B. HBR-5 Spyder	1.210
2	GT1.5	41	(United Kingdom) W.S. Frost	(United Kingdom) Peter Lumsden (United Kingdom) Peter Riley	Lotus Elite	1.113

=== Statistics ===
Taken from Quentin Spurring's book, officially licensed by the ACO

- Fastest lap in practice – Gurney, #12 Ferrari 250 TR/59 – 4m 03.3s; 199.07 km/h (123.70 mph)
- Fastest lap – Jean Behra, #12 Ferrari 250 TR/59 – 4:00.9secs; 201.16 km/h (125.00 mph)
- Distance – 4,347.90 km (2,701.66 mi)
- Winner's average speed – 181.16 km/h (112.57 mph)

=== Standings after the race ===
Pos	Championship	Points
1	(Italy) Ferrari	18
2	(United Kingdom) Aston Martin	16
3	(West Germany) Porsche	15
4	(Italy) Maserati	2
5	(Italy) Alfa Romeo	1

Championship points were awarded for the first six places in each race in the order of 8-6-4-3-2-1. Manufacturers were only awarded points for their highest finishing car with no points awarded for additional cars finishing. Only the best 4 results out of the 6 races would be included for the final score. Points earned but not counted towards the championship are given in brackets.

Citations

World Sportscar Championship
Previous race: 1000km of Nürburgring	1959 season	Next race: RAC Tourist Trophy
