= Border Reivers (racing team) =

Scottish motor racing team

Border Reivers was a motor racing team from Chirnside, Berwickshire in the Scottish Borders. The team was named after the raiders along the Anglo-Scottish border. Its most successful achievement was third place at the 1960 24 Hours of Le Mans. It is most notable for its involvement in the early racing career of Jim Clark, who was one of the drivers in the 1960 Le Mans entry.

== History ==
Jock McBain owned an engineering business and a car dealership in Chirnside, Berwickshire. He was a keen amateur racing driver and was instrumental in developing local airfields Winfield and Charterhall as motor-racing circuits. He encouraged friends to take up motor racing, primarily in Cooper 500s, and between them they formed Border Reivers. However, unlike rivals Ecurie Ecosse funding was in short supply and McBain closed down the team in 1956.

In late 1957, McBain was comprehensively beaten at Charterhall by Jim Clark and suggested to Clark's mentor Ian Scott-Watson that he manage a revived Border Reivers with Clark as driver. A Jaguar D-Type was purchased and Clark immediately began winning sports-car races the length and breadth of the UK. A trip to Brands Hatch to evaluate a possible purchase of a Formula 2 Lotus led instead to the purchase of a Lotus Elite, chassis number 1010. This car was entered in the 1959 24 Hours of Le Mans to be driven by Clark and Sir John Whitmore. They finished tenth overall and second in class. An ex-works Aston Martin DBR1 was then purchased and this car finished third at the following year's Le Mans, driven by Clark and Roy Salvadori. In 1961, with Clark now partnered by Ron Flockhart, the Aston failed to finish.

Border Reivers never entered a World Championship F1 race but did compete in several non-championship events, their best result being third place in the 1954 and 1955 Curtis Trophy with Jimmy Somervail's Cooper T20-Bristol.

In 1961 Jim Clark moved on to greater things and with the death of Jock McBain in that same year the team was wound up, but not before Flockhart had some success in Australia and New Zealand running a Cooper T51-Climax under the Reivers' banner.

The Border Reivers name has been revived on several occasions since, most recently running cars in Formula Ford 1600 and sports-car racing.

== 24 Hours of Le Mans ==
Year	Drivers	Car	Class	Laps	Pos.	Class pos.
1959	(United Kingdom) Jim Clark (United Kingdom) John Whitmore	Lotus Elite Mk.14-Climax	GT; 1.5	257	10th	2nd
1960	(United Kingdom) Jim Clark (United Kingdom) Roy Salvadori	Aston Martin DBR1/300	S 3.0	306	3rd	3rd
1961	(United Kingdom) Jim Clark (United Kingdom) Ron Flockhart	Aston Martin DBR1/300	S 3.0	132	DNF	DNF

== Bibliography ==
- Gauld, Graham: Scottish Motor Racing and Drivers: One Hundred Years of Scotland's Involvement with Motor Racing (Havelock Publishing, 2004, ISBN 0954916700)
