= Aston Martin DBR1 =

1956 sports racing car

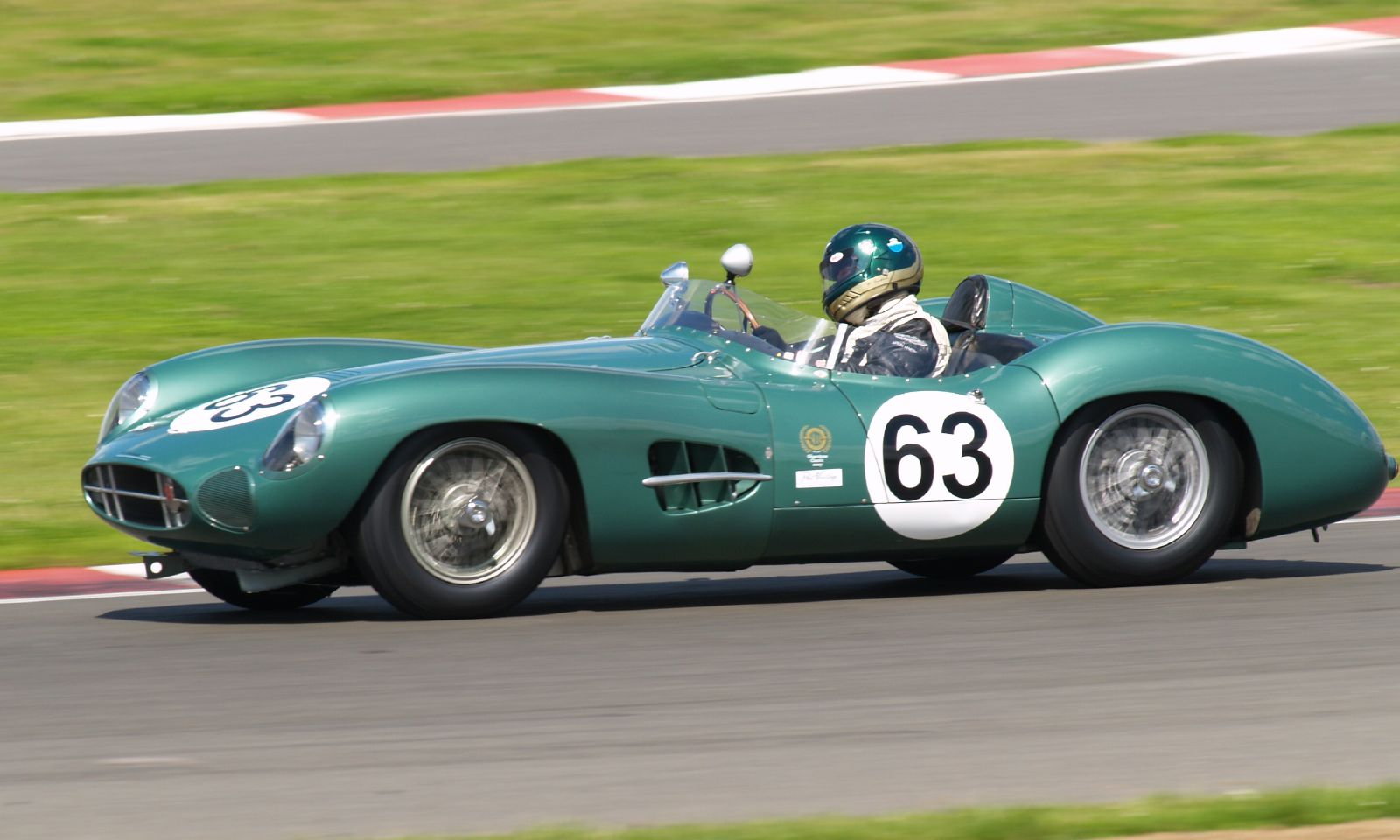
- Aston Martin DBR1/5 at Silverstone Classic 2007
- Category: Le Mans Racer Sports car racing
- Constructor: Aston Martin Lagonda LTD
- Designer: Ted Cutting

Technical specifications
- Chassis: Multi-tubular, space frame design
- Suspension (front): Torsion bar and trailing arms
- Suspension (rear): De Dion with longitudinal torsion bars and Watt linkage
- Length: 13 ft 2.5 in (4,026 mm)
- Width: 5 ft 4 in (1,630 mm)
- Height: 3 ft 2.5 in (978 mm)
- Axle track: 4 ft 3.5 in (1,308 mm)
- Wheelbase: 7 ft 6 in (2,290 mm)
- Engine: Aston Martin 2,493 cc / 2,992 cc, Straight six, FR Layout
- Transmission: David Brown CG537 5-speed manual
- Weight: 1,765 lb (801 kg)
- Tyres: Avon

Competition history
- Notable entrants: (United Kingdom) David Brown (Scotland) Border Reivers
- Notable drivers: (United Kingdom) Tony Brooks, (United Kingdom) Reg Parnell, (United Kingdom) Roy Salvadori, (United Kingdom) Les Leston, (United Kingdom) Noël Cunningham-Reid, (United Kingdom) Stuart Lewis-Evans, (United States) Carroll Shelby, (United Kingdom) Stirling Moss, (Australia) Jack Brabham, (France) Maurice Trintignant, (United Kingdom) Jack Fairman, (Belgium) Paul Frere, (Scotland) Jim Clark
- Debut: 1956 24 Hours of Le Mans
Races	Wins
18; Inc 4 Le Mans	9 Inc 1959 Le Mans
- Constructors' Championships: 1 (1959)

The Aston Martin DBR1 is a sports racing car built by Aston Martin starting in 1956, intended for the World Sportscar Championship as well as non-championship sportscar races at the time. It is most famous as the victor of the 1959 24 Hours of Le Mans, Aston Martin's only outright victory at the endurance classic. It is one of only three cars in the 1950s to win both the World Sports Car Championship and Le Mans 24 Hours in the same year (the others being the Ferrari 375 Plus in 1954 and the Ferrari 250TR in 1958). In addition the six World Sports Car Championship victories was a record for any car in the 1950s and remained a record in the championship until surpassed by the Ferrari 250TR. The three consecutive triumphs in 1959 at the Nürburgring, Le Mans and the Tourist Trophy equalled the record set by the Ferrari 250TR with its three consecutive victories at the start of the 1958 season.

In August 2017, car DBR1/1 was sold for a world record price for a British-made car of US$22,555,000.

== Design ==
Following changes to the rules for sportscar racing, entrants no longer had to use cars which were road legal, or based on road legal cars, such as the Aston Martin DB3S. Therefore, with the ability to create a sportscar from a clean slate for 1956, Aston Martin created the DBR1, with Ted Cutting as chief designer. The body evolved from the DB3S's shape, featuring a much lower profile. Most notable was that the back of the front wheel well was no longer left open. Instead, the DBR1 featured full bodywork with a large triangular vent on the side, a design trait which would become standard on all future Aston Martins.

The DBR1 was initially fitted with a smaller 2.5-litre (2493 cc) new all alloy racing engine (RB6.250) very loosely derived from the racing version of the Lagonda Straight-6 engine to comply with that year's Le Mans 24 Hour regulations whilst the RB6.300 Straight-6 (2992 cc), rated at 250 hp (186 kW) was developed for the 1957 season.

== Racing history ==
=== 1956 ===
Debuting at the non championship 1956 24 Hours of Le Mans, David Brown's Aston Martin racing team set out with the 2.5-litre DBR1/1 alongside two older 2.9-litre DB3Ss. Although performing well through most of the race against larger engined cars such as the winning Jaguar D-type with its 3.4-litre engine, the DBR1 suffered gearbox failure after 246 laps whilst lying seventh, forcing drivers Reg Parnell and Tony Brooks to retire.

=== 1957 ===
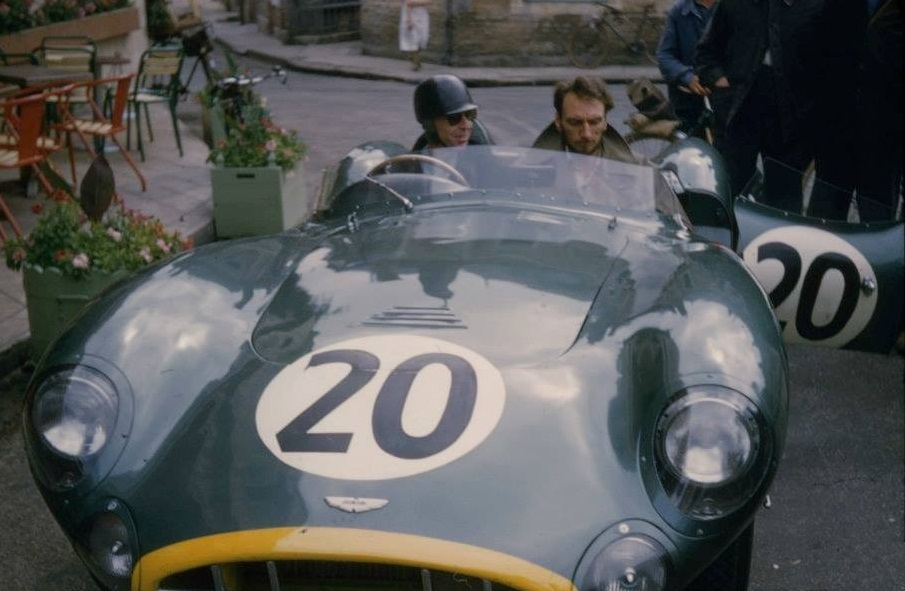
Tony Brooks with mechanic, Eric Hind parked outside the 1957 Le Mans Aston Martin base, the Hotel de France, at the wheel of his DBR1/2 race car.

Making a full debut in the 1957 World Sportscar Championship season as well as various non-championship races, Aston Martin started the season with DBR1/1 in 2.5-litre form and the car recorded its first finish, with a second place for Roy Salvadori at the British Empire Trophy, followed by another second place at the Goodwood Circuit's Sussex Trophy. DBR1/1 was then upgraded with the newer 3.0-litre engine, and joined by the identical DBR1/2. Together at the Spa Sportscar Race, Aston Martin took the top two spots, with Tony Brooks winning over Roy Salvadori. The DBR1s then made their World Sportscar Championship debut in the fourth round, the 1000km Nürburgring. Here DBR1/2 took an overall victory at the hands of Brooks and Noël Cunningham-Reid, earning Aston Martin its first World Championship win since the Collins/Griffith DB3S had won the Tourist Trophy in 1953. Salvadori and Les Leston finished sixth in the same race in DBR1/1. The victory against the full works might of Ferrari and Maserati with their 335S and 450S models in the hands of drivers such as Peter Collins, Mike Hawthorn, Moss and Juan Manuel Fangio gave the Aston Martin team confidence that they now had a car that could compete against the best in the world. Unfortunately these hopes were dashed at the 1957 24 Hours of Le Mans when both DBR1s failed to finish. The failure at Le Mans meant that any hopes of the World Championship had gone and Aston Martin missed the final two rounds in Sweden and Venezuela. Instead they entered the non-championship Spa Grand Prix, where DBR1/2 took the only other victory of the year in the hands of Brooks ahead of Masten Gregory in a Ferrari 290 MM and Olivier Gendebien in a Ferrari 335S with Salvadori fourth in DBR1/1.

=== 1958 ===
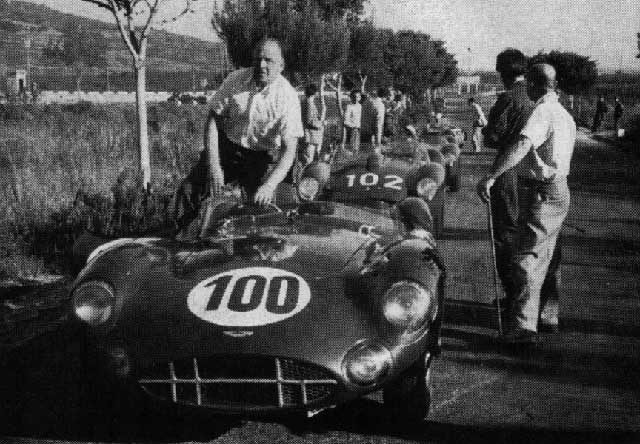
DBR1/3 at Targa Florio in 1958

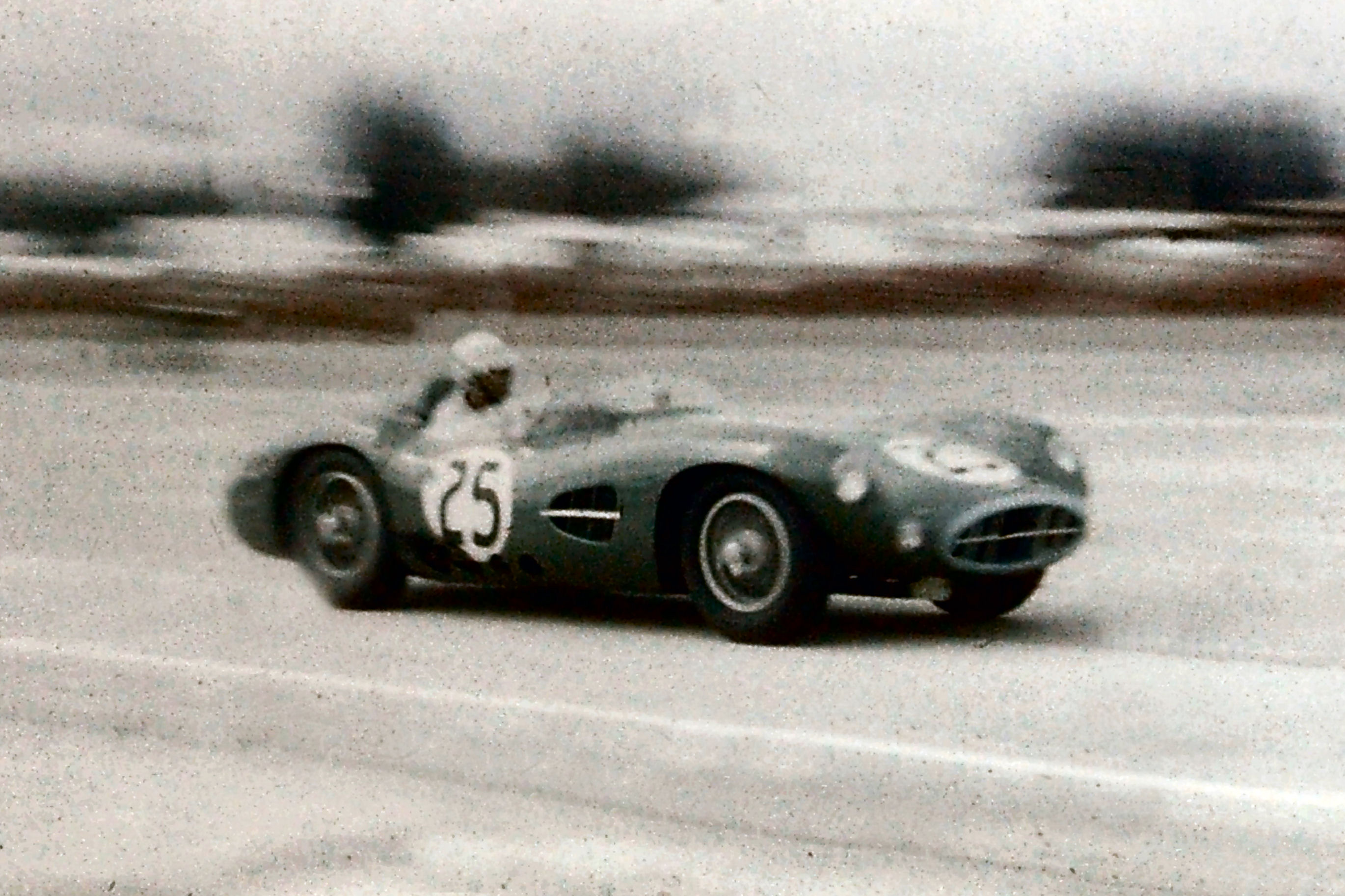
DBR1/1 driven by Carroll Shelby at Sebring on 22 March 1958.

For 1958, DBR1/3 was completed and Aston Martin now had three cars with which to compete. The World Sports Car Championship was now restricted to cars of no more than 3-litres and the team's DBR2 model with its 3.7-litre engine was ineligible. David Brown therefore chose to concentrate on the Championship with the DBR1, leaving the DBR2 for non-championship races. The team did not enter the opening round in Buenos Aires which was won by Ferrari, deciding instead to race at the following round, the 12 Hours of Sebring. Neither DBR1 managed to finish, both suffering gearbox failure, although in the hands of Moss it was the fastest car in the race. This was followed at the Targa Florio, with the new DBR1/3 also suffering a gearbox failure and not finishing but not before Moss had broken his old lap record set in the Mercedes 300SLR by over a minute. At the 1000 km Nürburgring, where the DBR1 had won the previous year, Aston Martin managed to repeat their victory, with Moss and Jack Brabham's DBR1/3 beating a large contingent of Ferraris and Porsches. Unfortunately the bad luck returned at Le Mans, with all three DBR1s failing to finish again. However, at the season ending Tourist Trophy, Aston Martin managed a 1-2-3 finish with Moss and Brooks driving the winning car (DBR1/2) ahead of Salvadori/Brabham in DBR1/1 and Shelby/Stuart Lewis-Evans in DBR1/3. However Ferrari had chosen not to compete having already won the championship and the race was only of four hour duration and consequently only half points were awarded. This victory allowed Aston Martin to finish second in the constructor's championship behind Ferrari.

=== 1959 ===
Aston Martin DBR1
Aston Martin DBR1 at Goodwood Festival of Speed 2009

Returning again for 1959, Aston Martin had completed two more chassis, DBR1/4 and DBR1/5. The first car was actually a conversion from a DBR3, while DBR1/5 was a spare chassis sold to privateer Graham Whitehead. This latter car was the only DBR1 to be sold to a privateer during the 1956-9 period when the factory team campaigned with them. With four chassis, Aston Martin would again concentrate on the World Sportscar Championship. The season started slowly, with a sole entry, DBR1/1, in the hands of Salvadori and Shelby failing to finish at the 12 Hours of Sebring which resulted in a 1-2 for Ferrari with their 250TR model. This was then followed by the team not appearing at the Targa Florio which was won by Porsche with a 1-2-3-4. Aston Martin then completed a hat trick of victories as the sole factory entry (DBR1/1) again won the 1000km Nürburgring, with Moss and Jack Fairman driving. In addition to this victory, Aston Martin finally achieved what is considered their finest motorsports triumph. DBR1/2, driven by Carroll Shelby and Salvadori, took victory at the 1959 24 Hours of Le Mans. DBR1/4, driven by Maurice Trintignant and Paul Frére, managed second. The next closest competitor was a distant 25 laps behind the duo.

With the constructors championship now closely contested by Ferrari, Porsche and Aston Martin, the team appeared at the final round, the Tourist Trophy at Goodwood. Aston Martin entered three DBR1s, as well as privateer Whitehead's DBR1/5. During the race, DBR1/3 which had been leading caught fire whilst refuelling in the pits, damaging the car too badly to continue and leaving Aston Martin without room to refuel their other cars. To salvage Aston Martin's hopes of the championship, Whitehead withdrew his entry from the race in order to allow Aston Martin to use his pits stall and finish the race. Moss took over the car driven by Shelby and Fairman and in DBR1/2 was able to secure victory and the championship. The remaining Aston, DBR1/4, in the hands of Trintignant/Frere came fourth. Aston Martin scored 24 points from their three victories with Ferrari in second place with a net 18 points, 22 gross and Porsche third also with a net 18 points but 21 gross. This was the only World Sports Car Championship won by Aston Martin.

=== Privateers ===
Following Aston Martin's success in 1959, David Brown decided to make a move to Formula One with the DBR4 and DBR5 that ultimately proved unsuccessful. Thus the factory's David Brown Racing Department would no longer compete in sports cars. The four DBR1s retained by the factory, including the rebuilt DBR1/3, were sold off to customers for use in various series.

Notable privateers included Border Reivers, Ian Baille, David Hamm, and Essex Racing Stable. DBR1/3 finished 3rd at 1960 Oulton Park, 3rd at Le Mans driven by Salvadori and Jim Clark, and in 1961, finished 1st at Charterhall driven by Jimmy Blumer for the final victory for any DBR1. DBR1/2 won the 1960 Rouen Grand Prix with Fairman. In 1961, two DBR1s failed to finish at Le Mans driven by Salvadori and Tony Maggs and Ron Flockhart and Clark. Following the 1962 season, all DBR1s would retire from racing and eventually end up in museums or private collections. DBR1/3 is on display at the Simeone Foundation Automotive Museum in Philadelphia, Pennsylvania.1956

DBR1/4 is notable for having appeared in the 1959 film adaptation of The Sound and the Fury.

== Chassis ==
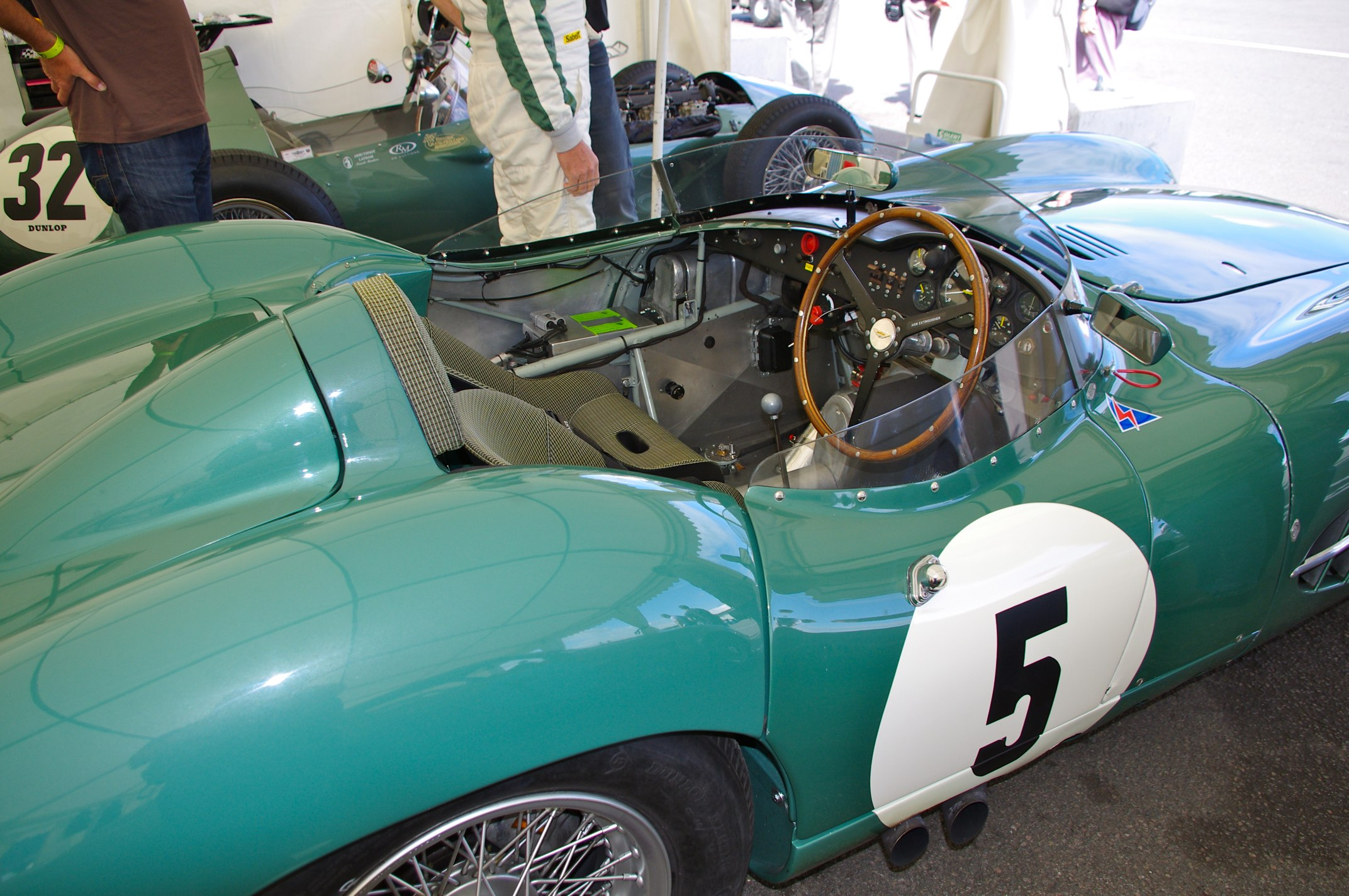
Cockpit of DBR1/5

Included are a list of victories by each chassis.

- DBR1/1 – Completed 1956
  - 1959 1000 km Nürburgring
- DBR1/2 – Completed 1957
  - 1957 Spa Sportscar Race
  - 1957 1000 km Nürburgring
  - 1957 Spa Grand Prix
  - 1958 Goodwood Tourist Trophy
  - 1959 24 Hours of Le Mans (overall winner)
  - 1959 Goodwood Tourist Trophy
  - 1960 Rouen Grand Prix (as a privateer)
- DBR1/3 – Completed 1958
  - 1958 1000 km Nürburgring - Moss/Jack Brabham (overall winner)
  - 1961 Charterhall - Flockhart (overall winner)
- DBR1/4 – Completed 1959 (conversion from DBR3/1)
  - None
- DBR1/5 – Completed 1959
  - None

== DBR3 ==
Aston Martin used a chassis initially meant for the DBR1 to construct a car known as DBR3, and given the chassis number DBR3/1. The car was different in that it used Aston Martin's newly designed 3.7-litre (3670cc) Straight-6 from the Aston Martin DB4, downsized to 3.0-litre (2990cc). The car was used in only a single race in 1958 before it was deemed uncompetitive. DBR3/1 was thus given a normal Lagonda Straight-6 and rechristened as DBR1/4.
