= Hotel de France (Le Mans / La Chartre sur le Loir) =

Hotel in La Chartre Sur Le Loir, France

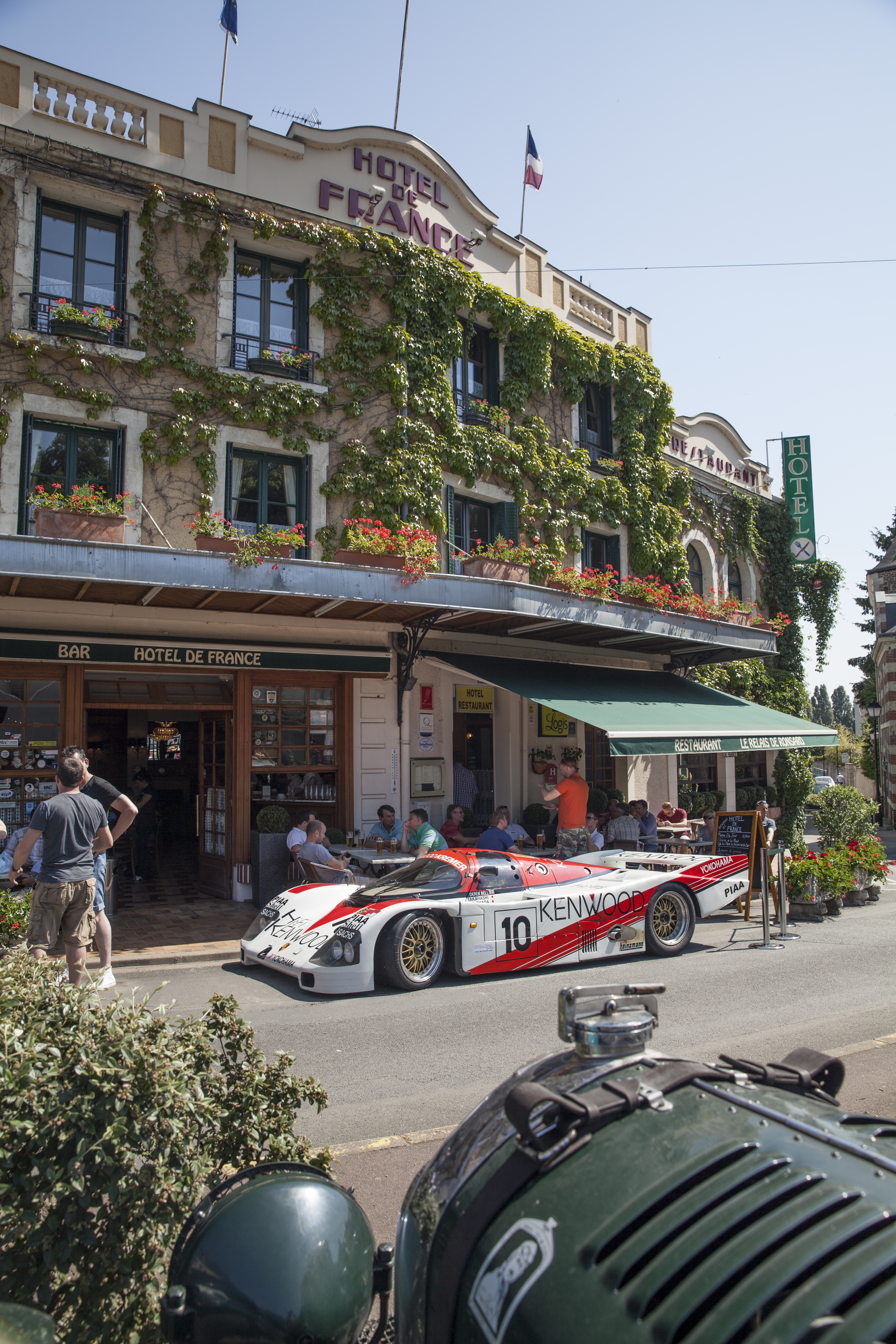

- Location within Pays de la Loire

General information
- Architectural style: Art Deco
- Location: La Chartre-sur-le-Loir, France
- Coordinates: 47.7280°N 0.5759°E
- Completed: 1890
- Opening: 1905

Technical details
- Floor count: 3

Other information
- Number of rooms: 22
- Number of restaurants: 1
- Parking: Yes

Website
- http://www.lhoteldefrance.fr/

The Hotel de France is a historic hotel in the centre of the town of La Chartre Sur Le Loir. The 22 room hotel, with its Art Deco facade, is located at 20, Place de la République, 27 miles south of Le Mans. It is famous for its long association with the drivers, teams and cars of the Le Mans 24 Hours race.

== History ==
The hotel opened for business in 1905, having been run by the Pasteau family for the past four generations, before a change of ownership at the end of 2013. From 1953, it was used as headquarters for Le Mans racing teams, most notably by teams managed by John Wyer. Wyer ran the victorious Aston Martin and Gulf Oil teams from the hotel, his first Le Mans victory, celebrated at the hotel, coming in 1959. As a consequence, the hotel is full of motor racing history.

The garage to the side of the hotel and what is now a car park at the rear were used by mechanics to work on the race cars, which would then be driven on public roads to and from the circuit until the early 1970s. The hotel is a mecca for fans of the Le Mans 24 Hours race. The bar walls are covered with photos of past and present racing drivers, many of them signed by the drivers themselves.To date, the hotel has hosted numerous notable guests, including internationally recognized racing drivers, film actors, heads of state, and members of royal families.

The hotel underwent an extensive refurbishment at the start of 2014, retaining and highlighting its motor sport heritage.

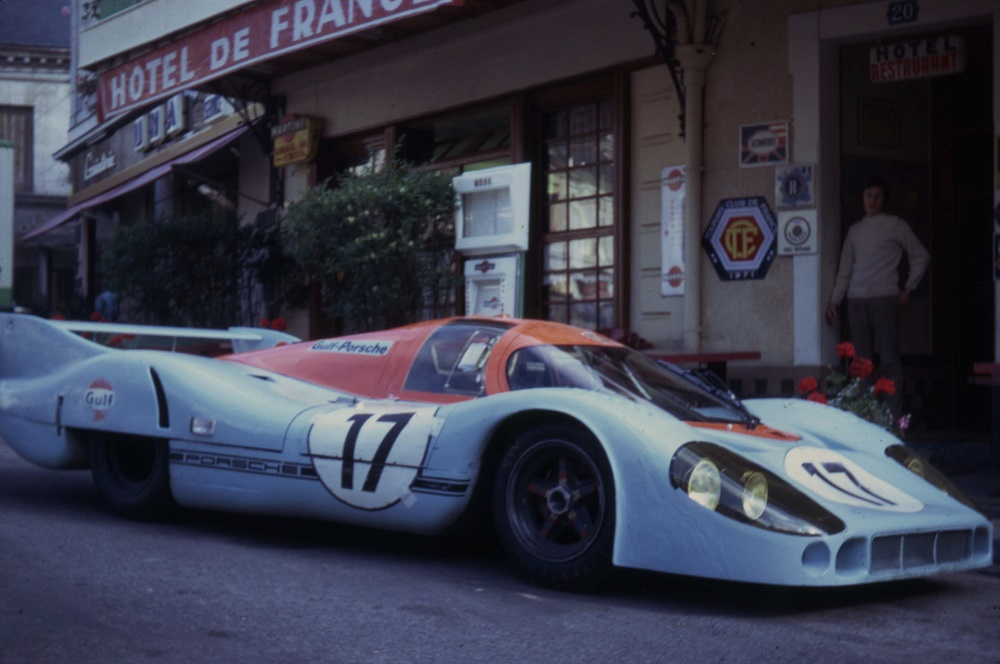
The 1971 Le Mans Porsche 917LH driven by Derek Bell & Jo Siffert outside Hotel de France.

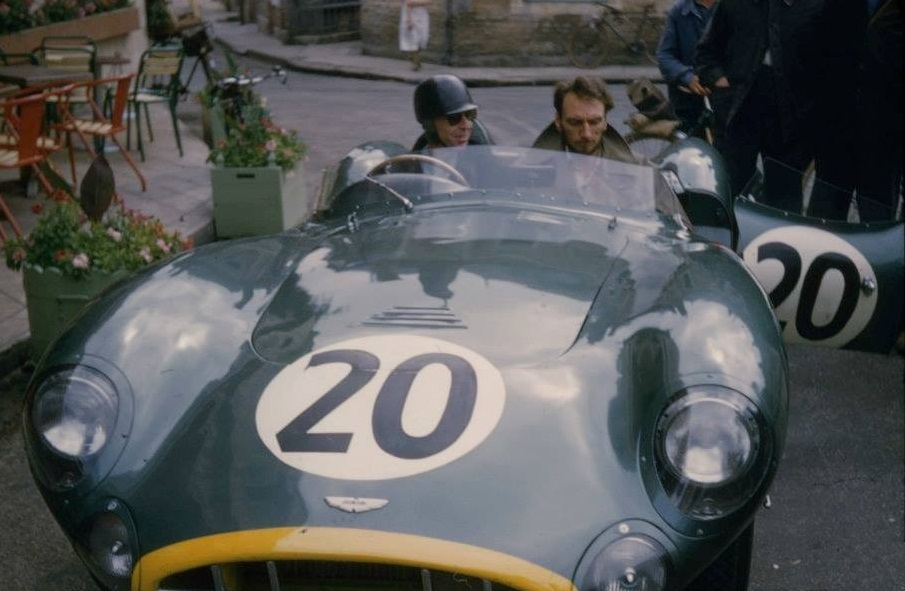
Tony Brooks parked outside the 1957 Le Mans Aston Martin base, the Hotel de France, at the wheel of his DBR1 race car.

== Notable residents ==
=== Motor racing drivers and team principals ===
Le Mans 24 Hours winners, including 6-time winner Jacky Ickx, 5-time winner Derek Bell, the 1954 winner Maurice Trintignant in a Ferrari 375 Plus, the 1958 winners Phil Hill and Olivier Gendebien in a Ferrari 250 TR58, the 1959 winners Carroll Shelby and Roy Salvadori in an Aston Martin DBR1, the 1960 winner Paul Frere in a Ferrari 250 TR59/60, the 1965 winner Jochen Rindt in a Ferrari 275P, the 1966 winner Bruce Mclaren in a Ford GT40, the 1968 winners Pedro Rodriguez and Lucien Bianchi in a Gulf Ford GT40, the 1969 winner Jackie Oliver, again in a Gulf Ford GT40, the 1970 winner, and the first British driver to win for Porsche, Richard Attwood, the 1972 winner Graham Hill in a Matra, the 1978 winner Jean Pierre Jaussaud in a Renault Alpine A442, the 1983 winner Vern Schuppan, renowned Le Mans racers Stirling Moss, Jo Siffert, Jackie Stewart, Justin Bell, Mario Andretti, Mike Salmon, Brian Redman, David Hobbs, Jo Schlesser, Innes Ireland, Jack Fairman, Reg Parnell, John Whitmore, Jacques Laffite, Tony Brooks, Peter Collins, Briggs Cunningham, Mike Hailwood, David Piper, current Aston Martin Racing driver Darren Turner, race car constructor Guy Ligier, Jean-Pierre Jarier, Francois Migault, Marino Franchitti, Indy 500 winner Dario Franchitti, team manager John Wyer, Formula One principal and team owner Frank Williams and Prodrive chairman David Richards (racing).

=== Actors and film directors ===
Steve McQueen when preparing for the cult 1971 movie Le Mans.

=== Leaders of state and royalty ===
President Rene Coty of France, Prince Bertil of Sweden, Pierre Salinger (John F. Kennedy's press secretary) and the children of both John F. Kennedy and Robert F. Kennedy.
