= Jack Lumsden =

Modern pentathlete

Personal information
- Born: 25 April 1927 Marylebone, London, England
- Died: 22 October 2012 (aged 85)

Sport
- Sport: Modern pentathlon

John Michael George "Jack" Lumsden (25 April 1927 – 22 October 2012) was a British modern pentathlete. He was the son of Lieutenant-General Herbert Lumsden and brother of Peter Lumsden (racing driver). He competed at the 1948 Summer Olympics.
