= Peter Lumsden (racing driver) =

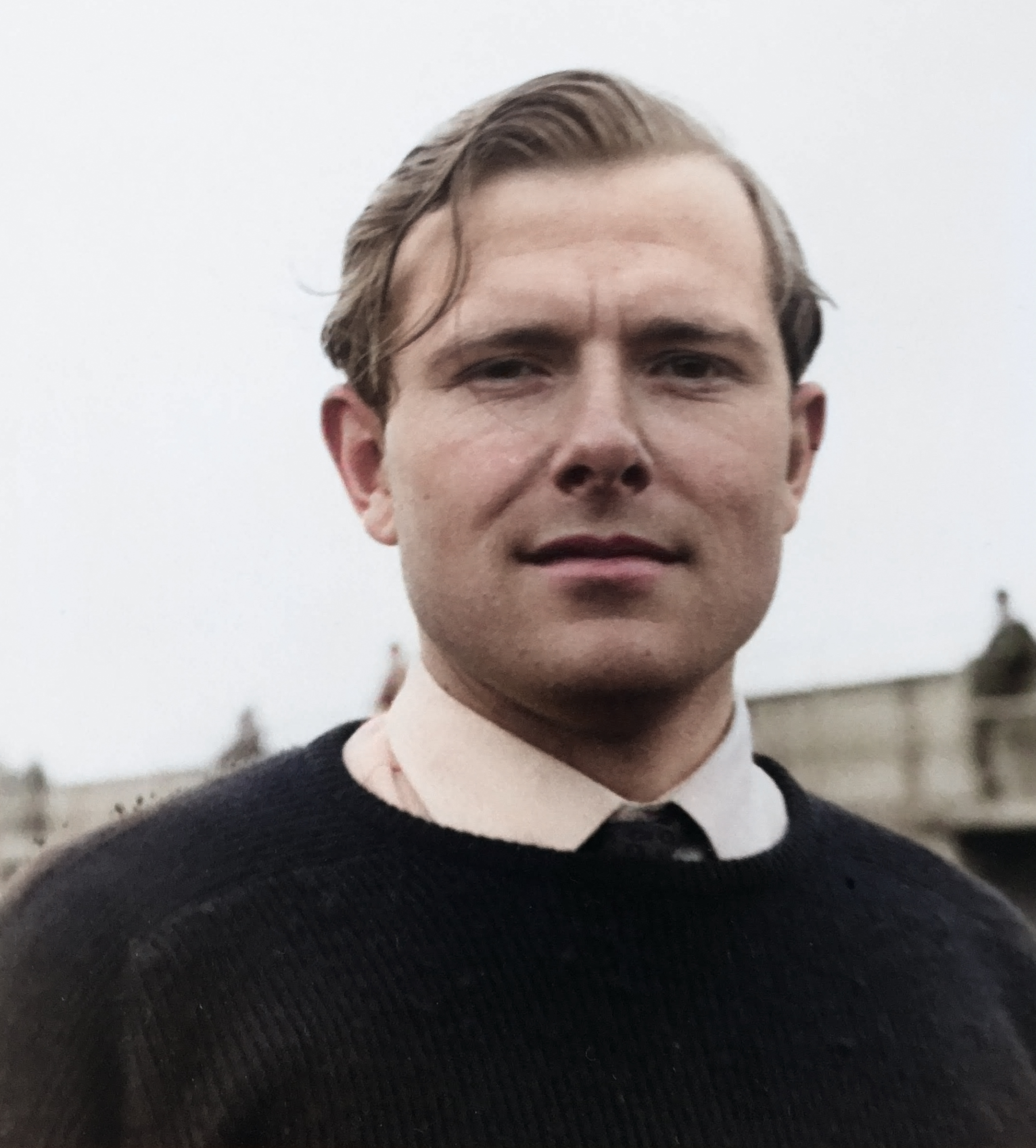
- Nationality: British
- Born: Peter James Scott Lumsden; 20 February 1929
- Died: 15 October 2017 (aged 88)
- Years active: 1959–1965

Peter James Scott Lumsden, CBE (20 February 1929 – 15 October 2017) was a British privateer motorsport competitor who gained renown between 1959 and 1965 racing at Le Mans, the Nürburgring, Silverstone & Goodwood before twice winning at Brands Hatch in his final season in 1965. He was the younger son of Lieutenant-General Herbert Lumsden and brother of the modern pentathlete Jack Lumsden.

== Racing career ==
Lumsden started racing in 1956 with the Lotus-Climax Mk IX, (RYF 446) enjoying considerable success including victory in his first sortie at Goodwood. This together with numerous other second and third places brought him the prestigious Motor Sport Brooklands Memorial Trophy at the end of his first season. During this period Lumsden also befriended a young Lotus mechanic named Graham Hill and let him race the car on a couple of occasions.

After less rewarding outings in 1957 and 1958 with an early works Lotus Eleven (ORX 556), Lumsden acquired the third Lotus Elite prototype (WUU2) in late 1958. Lumsden raced the Elite extensively in 1959. After winning the 1300 cc GT class in the Nürburgring 1000 km round of the World Sports Car Championship with co-driver Peter Riley, the pair took part in the prestigious Le Mans 24 Hours. Winner that year was Carroll Shelby with co-driver Roy Salvadori in the Aston Martin DBR1/300 but the two Peters finished a respectable 8th overall, 1st in the 1500 cc GT class, 2nd in the newly instigated Index of Thermal Efficiency and 5th in the Index of Performance.

In 1960 Lumsden began his partnership with co-driver Peter Sargent at the Nürburgring 1000 Ks, finishing second in the 1300 cc GT class to the Team Elite entry for Alan Stacey and John Wagstaff. Driving solo, Peter Lumsden then won the 1300 CC GT class of the 1960 RAC Tourist Trophy at Goodwood, finishing ninth overall behind various Ferraris and Aston Martins plus Graham Hill's Porsche Carrera Abarth and 5.2 seconds ahead of Graham Warner's famous Elite LOV 1 after three hours of racing.

In Lumsden & Riley's final season in the Elite in 1961 they again produced a 1300 cc GT class win in the Nürburgring 1000 km. In the TT later that year, Lumsden driving solo had to settle for second in class to Les Leston's Elite DAD 10, whilst finishing eighth overall.

In 1961 Lumsden and his now permanent co-driver Peter Sargent were able to acquire one of the earliest (898 BYR) E-Types off the production line at Jaguar. This was a measure of Lumsden & Sargent's standing as drivers as these cars were provided exclusively to influential motor sport teams and drivers as a result of supply problems at the Jaguar factory. In late September 1961 a fifth place in the Molyslip Trophy at Snetterton behind Mike Parkes (Ferrari 250GT Berlinetta), Roy Salvadori (E-type) and Innes Ireland (Aston Martin DB4GT), and ahead of all the other E-types, was an encouraging debut while the high point of the following year was Le Mans where the two Peters finished fifth overall, and second in the 4-litre GT class behind the Roy Salvadori/Briggs Cunningham E-type. With little more than an hour of the race remaining, 898 BYR was several laps ahead of the Cunningham car when the gearbox became stuck in fourth gear and they could only tour round to the finish.

In 1963 Peter Sargent bought a Lister-Jaguar from fellow privateer John Coundly. He also bought the logbook and number plate 'WTM446' which had originally belonged to an open-cockpit Costin bodied sports racing Lister-Jaguar that had crashed and been written off on the set of the 1961 MGM film,`The Green Helmet'. Sargent and Lumsden then created the 'Spaceframe' Lister-Jaguar GT Prototype (WTM446) that they tested at Le Mans in April 1963. Further testing followed in May at Brands Hatch followed by a sortie at Silverstone before the car was loaned back to Coundly and eventually sold to Jaguar Drivers Club chairman, David Harvey. Key to the development of the Lister-Jaguar GT Prototype was the involvement of Frank Costin, mechanic Brian Playford and engineer Samir Klat, who would go on to play a vital part in the next stage of Lumsden's racing career.

== The Jaguar E-Type lightweight '49 FXN' ==
In 1963 Lumsden & Sargent acquired a Jaguar Lightweight E-Type (vehicle number 49 FXN), one of only 12 built at the time. On its debut in the 1963 Nurburgring 1000 km, Lumsden crashed 49 FXN badly and was fortunate to escape with his life. The car was returned to the Jaguar factory to be rebuilt and subsequently underwent extensive aerodynamic revision under Dr Samir Klat of Imperial College. On returning to competition in 1964, the car was timed at 168 mph on the Mulsanne straight during the Le Mans test weekend but failed to complete the race itself due to gearbox failure. Lumsden's best result of his few races in the car that year was eighth overall, fifth in class, in the Goodwood TT. Peter Sargent retired from racing at the end of that year but Peter Lumsden retained the car for one more season, winning a couple of victories in club races at Brands Hatch but no longer competitive against the new generation of Cobras and Ferrari 250GT0s. For his last visit to the Nürburgring, Lumsden shared Peter Sutcliffe's Ferrari 250 GTO (449 1GT), which he had bought off David Piper, to win the 3-litre GT class. At the end of the 1965 season Peter Lumsden joined Peter Sargent in racing retirement and 49 FXN was sold and in due course became one of the most sought after low drag light weight E-types of all time, known as 49 FXN or the Lumsden/Sargent car.

== Retirement ==
A chartered accountant by qualification, when Lumsden left the London Stock Exchange he took up farming near Dover. In 1995 he was appointed a CBE for services to healthcare
