= 1958 Targa Florio =

The 42° Targa Florio took place on 11 May, on the Circuito Piccolo delle Madonie, (Sicily, Italy). It was the third round of the 1958 World Sportscar Championship, which was running to new regulations introduced at the beginning of the season. The most influential of these regulations changes would be the 3.0 litre engine size limit. The event returned to the championship for the first time since 1955, following the demise of the Mille Miglia and the ban on road racing on mainland Italy. But such outcry did not deter Vincenzo Florio from holding his event on the traditional 45 mile mountainous circuit.

== Report ==
=== Entry ===
A massive total of 65 racing cars were registered for this event, of which 53 arrived for practice. Of these, only 38 started the long-distance race on the public roads of Sicily. This, the 42nd edition of the event, saw a change on the nature of the race. Two drivers would be permitted now and the limit set so no driver would drive more than seven laps out of the total race distance of 14. So, it ensured no single driver would be able to complete the whole race.

The first two events of the season, the 1000 km Buenos Aires and 12 Hours of Sebring ended with victory for Phil Hill and Peter Collins, for Scuderia Ferrari. As Hill and Collins also won the last race of the previous season, the Venezuelan Grand Prix they’ve now won three races in a row for the Scuderia. With these new rules, and Maserati on the brink of financial crisis, Scuderia Ferrari would head the Italian challenge. Ferrari had four works 250 TRs in Sicily, Hill/Collins, Mike Hawthorn/Wolfgang von Trips, Luigi Musso/Olivier Gendebien and Gino Munaron/Wolfgang Seidel. Opposition would no longer come from Maserati, but from Porsche and Aston Martin.

David Brown sent just one Aston Martin DBR1 over from England for Stirling Moss/Tony Brooks, while Porsche arrived with three different cars, a 356A Carrera, a 550 RS and a 718 RSK, for their squad of drivers led by Jean Behra and Giorgio Scarlatti. They were joined by a fleet of privateer drivers in their Alfa Romeos, Oscas and other mainline sportscars.

=== Qualifying ===
Prior to the race, there was no formal practice held, but Sergio Der Stephanian was killed in a pre-race accident, following a collision with a sand-laden lorry. He died shortly after in hospital.

=== Race ===
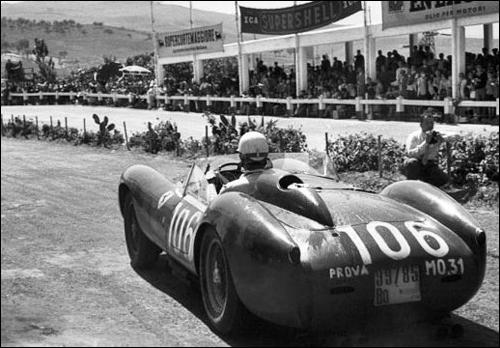
The winners, Musso and Gendebien drove this entry #106, a Ferrari 250 TR 58

With each lap 45 miles in length, the race covered a total of 14 laps, or 630 miles, the Targa Florio is unlike any other sports car race. Littered with switchback turns, blind corners and a straight nearly four miles longer than Circuit de la Sarthe’s Mulsanne, the Targa was a thing to behold.

Day of the race would be sunny and warm, with the first of the cars leaving the small village of Cerda, one-by-one, at 40 second intervals. It was clear right at the start that something was amiss for most of the competitors, as more than a few would be off the pace, while others would be off the road, in verges trying to repair their cars and get back into the race. Jean Behra would spin his Porsche 718 RSK. Moss would damage a wheel when he went off the road. Meanwhile, von Trips damaged his Ferrari heavily and returned to the pits dragging a bit of his car along the ground. It seemed that everyone was struggling over the mountain roads, except one, Musso.

Musso was setting an incredible pace. He started last of the big works entrants, but at the end of the first lap, he would be first. Being in the lead, he set about performing an error-free drive. Moss would be on the hunt in his Aston, ever-impressive sliding around the corners, kicking up gravel everywhere and carrying on without any trouble whatsoever, following that earlier incident. He would break the lap record, lapping more than a minute faster than Musso. But the Italian had already done all of his headwork. He led and held steady before handing the car over to Gendebien.

With Gendebien now the car, Moss would take his Aston even faster, but it came at a price. After five laps, the gearbox gave up and Moss was out of the race, before Brooks had a chance to race. Despite the retirement of the sole Aston Martin, the circuit maintained the pressure on the factory efforts. Hill would end up in a ditch, losing valuable time trying to get out and back on his way. As for the Belgian, he was driving smartly, keeping the car on the road, and in the lead. He was just a few laps before returning the car back to Musso. This was the only Ferrari not under heavy pressure from Behra. The nimble little RSK was proving itself on the winding roads, and joining the battle for a spot in the top three.

Musso held a commanding lead, despite the advances of Behra. But Musso was not immune to trouble. Only three laps from the end, there was trouble. He appeared to be off the pace, lapping four minutes slower than previously. He was happy to make it back to the pits, as the brake fluid had leaked out of its reservoir. He had no brakes. It was reported that he completed the descent out of the mountains by staying in low gear. In any other race, this would have spelled the end, however, Musso and Gendebien had controlled the race right from the start. Such was their lead, the Ferrari mechanics repaired the car, Gendebien got back in the car for the remaining laps, still with a three-minute lead.

Now the leaders were out of trouble, their teammates von Trips and Hawthorn were not. They were in second place, but with Behra back in the Porsche and absolutely flying. Following a pit stop, the margin between the Ferrari and Porsche would be practically nothing. There was no stopping Behra, and he continued to up his pace and Hawthorn could not respond. Starting the 14th and last lap, Behra’s pace had meant he was now ahead.

Out in front, Gendebien brought the 250 TR home, to record a brilliant victory. Though Moss had set a new lap record in his Aston, the race had been dominated from the very beginning by Musso. Car number 106, took an impressive victory, winning in a time 10hr 37:58.1, averaging a speed of 59.251 mph. Second place went to the Porsche of Behra and Giorgio Scarlatti, albeit over 5½ minutes adrift. The podium was complete by second Scuderia Ferrari of von Trips and Hawthorn, who were 54 secs behind in third.

== Official Classification ==
Class Winners are in Bold text.

Pos	No	Class	Driver		Entrant	Chassis	Laps	Reason Out
1st	**106**	**S3.0**	(Italy) **Luigi Musso**	(Belgium) **Olivier Gendebien**	**Scuderia Ferrari**	**Ferrari 250 TR 58**	**10hr 37:58.1, 14**	
2nd	**68**	**S1.5**	(France) **Jean Behra**	(Italy) **Giorgio Scarlatti**	**Porsche KG**	**Porsche 718 RSK**	**10hr 43:37.9, 14**	
3rd	102	S3.0	(West Germany) Wolfgang von Trips	(United Kingdom) Mike Hawthorn	Scuderia Ferrari	Ferrari 250 TR 58	10hr 44:29.3, 14	
4th	98	S3.0	(United Kingdom) Peter Collins	(United States) Phil Hill	Scuderia Ferrari	Ferrari 250 TR 58	11hr 10:01.4, 14	
5th	72	S1.5	(Italy) Giulio Cabianca	(Italy) Franco Bordoni		Osca S1500 TN	11hr 25:35.7, 14	
6th	**26**	**GT1.6**	(Italy) **Antonio Pucci**	(West Germany) **Huschke von Hanstein**	**Porsche KG**	**Porsche 356A Carrera 1500 GS**	**11hr 54:04.6, 14**	
7th	**90**	**S2.0**	(Italy) **Gaetano Starrabba**	(Italy) **Franco Cortese**		**Ferrari 500 TRC**	**12hr 04:20.8, 14**	
8th	**24**	**GT1.3**	(Italy) **Nini Todaro**	(Italy) **“Nessuno”**		**Alfa Romeo Giuletta Spider Veloce**	**12hr 08:39.4, 14**	
9th	8	GT1.3	(Italy) Carlo Maria Abate	(Italy) Gianni Balzarini		Alfa Romeo Giuletta Sprint Veloce	12hr 10:02.5, 14	
10th	96	S2.0	(Italy) Bernardo Cammarota	(Italy) Domenico Tramontana		Ferrari 500 TRC	12hr 33:18.0, 14	
11th	**58**	**S1.1**	(Italy) **Antonio di Salvo**	(Italy) **Domenico Minneci**		**Raor-Fiat 1100 Special**	**12hr 36:42.4, 14**	
12th	6	GT1.3	(Italy) Casimiro Toselli	(Italy) Armando Filippa		Alfa Romeo Giuletta Sprint Veloce	12hr 42:32.9, 14	
13th	**42**	**GT2.6**	(Italy) **Rosario Montalbano**	(Italy) **Gaspare Bologna**		**Fiat 8V**	**12hr 57:20.9, 14**	
14th	60	S1.1	(Italy) Gaspare Cavaliere	(Italy) Salvatore Sirchia		Fiat 1100/103 TV	14	
15th	14	GT1.3	(Italy) Ada Pace	(Italy) Carlo Peroglio		Alfa Romeo Giuletta Sprint Veloce	14	
DNF	40	GT2.6	(Italy) Raimondo Gangitano	(Italy) Gianfernando Tomaselli		Lancia Aurelia	13	did not finish
DNF	80	S1.5	(Italy) Giorgio Scarlatti	(East Germany) Edgar Barth	Porsche KG	Porsche 550 RS	13	did not finish
DNF	104	S3.0	(Italy) Gino Munaron	(West Germany) Wolfgang Seidel	Scuderia Ferrari	Ferrari 250 TR 58	13	Off course
DNF	16	GT1.3	(Italy) Vincenzo Arena (Italy) Luigi Arena	(Italy) Diego Pagano		Alfa Romeo Giuletta Sprint Veloce	12	did not finish
DNF	28	GT2.6	(Italy) Franco Dari	(Italy) Giuseppe Cucchiarelli		Fiat 8V	12	did not finish
DNF	2	GT1.3	(Italy) Sergio Mantia	(Italy) Giuseppe Ramirez		Fiat 1100/103 TV		did not finish
DNF	4	GT1.3	(Italy) Baldassare Taormina	(Italy) Pasquale Tacci		Alfa Romeo Giuletta Sprint Veloce		did not finish
DNF	12	GT1.3	(Italy) Ettore Marconi	(Italy) Piero Frescobaldi		Alfa Romeo Giuletta Sprint Veloce		did not finish
DNF	18	GT1.3	(Italy) Domenico Lo Coco	(Italy) Roberto Gugielmini		Alfa Romeo Giuletta Sprint Veloce		did not finish
DNF	20	GT1.3	(Italy) Sergio Bettoja	(Italy) P. Feroldi		Alfa Romeo Giuletta Sprint Veloce		did not finish
DNF	30	GT2.6	(Italy) Nino Vaccarella	(Italy) Enrico Giaccone		Lancia Aurelia B20		did not finish
DNF	34	GT2.6	(Italy) Giuseppe Parla	(Italy) Umberto Lo Pinto		Lancia Aurelia B20		did not finish
DNF	38	GT2.6	(Italy) Alfonso Vella	(Italy) Pietro Termini		Fiat 8V		did not finish
DNF	48	GT3.0	(Italy) Guido Cestelli-Guidi	(Italy) Giuseppe Musso		Mercedes-Benz 300 SL		did not finish
DNF	52	GT3.0	(Italy) Pietro Ferraro	(Italy) Paolo Ferraro		Ferrari 250 GT LWB		did not finish
DNF	54	S1.1	(Italy) Guido Garufi	(Italy) Lorenzo Melarosa		Osca MT4 1100		did not finish
DNF	64	S1.1	(Italy) Giuseppe Rossi	(Italy) Enzo Buzzetti		Osca MT4 1100		did not finish
DNF	66	S1.1	(Italy) Domenico Rotolo	(Italy) Luigi di Pasquale		Osca S1100		did not finish
DNF	70	S1.5	(United Kingdom) Colin Davis	(Argentina) Alejandro de Tomaso	Automobili Osca	Osca S1500 TN	2	Accident damage
DNF	74	S1.5	(Italy) Luciano Mantovani	(Italy) Ludovico Scarfiotti	Automobili Osca	Osca S1500 TN	2/3	Gearbox/Accident damage
DNF	84	S2.0	(Italy) Mennaro Boffa	(Italy) Odoardo Govoni	Maserati	Maserati 200S I	0	Clutch (at start)
DNF	88	S2.0	(Italy) Anna Maria Peduzzi	(Italy) Francesco Siracusa		Ferrari 500 TR		did not finish
DNF	100	S3.0	(United Kingdom) Stirling Moss	(United Kingdom) Tony Brooks	David Brown Racing Department	Aston Martin DBR1/300	4	Gearbox
DNS	10	GT1.3	(Italy) Nicoly			Alfa Romeo Giuletta Sprint Veloce		did not start
DNS	22	GT1.3	(Italy) Giuseppe Pizzo	(Italy) Emanuele Trapani		Alfa Romeo Giuletta Sprint Veloce		did not start
DNS	32	GT2.6	(Italy) Giuseppe Conigliaro	(Italy) Mario Conigliaro		Lancia Aurelia B24		did not start
DNS	36	GT2.6	(Italy) Carol Fabi	(Italy) Gianfranco Fabbri		Fiat 8V		did not start
DNS	44	GT3.0	(Italy) Armando Zampiero	(Italy) Zampiero Villotti		Ferrari 250 GT		did not start
DNS	46	GT3.0	(Italy) Arnaldo Bongiasca	(Italy) Mario Bongiasca		Mercedes-Benz 300 SL		did not start
DNS	50	GT3.0	(Italy) Sergio Der Stephanian	(Italy) Adolfo Macchieraldo		Ferrari 250 GT LWB		did not start (Fatal accident in practice – Stephanian)
DNS	56	S1.1	(Italy) Francesco La Mattina			Osca MT4 1100		did not start
DNS	62	S1.1	(Italy) Francesco Paolo D’Agostino (Italy) Vincenzo Sorrentino	(Italy) Silvio Boffa		Osca MT4 1100		did not start
DNS	76	S1.5	(Italy) Alfonso Thiele			Porsche 356 Carrera		did not start
DNS	82	S2.0	(Italy) Guido Perrella	(Italy) Giuliano Giovanardi		Maserati 200S I		did not start
DNS	86	S2.0	(Italy) Elio Pandolfo (Italy) Mario Pandolfo	(Italy) Claudio Faranda		Ferrari 500 TR		did not start
DNS	92	S2.0	(Italy) Giuseppe Alotta			Maserati A6GCS/53		did not start
DNS	94	S2.0	(Italy) Enzo Lopez	(Italy) Mario Bornigia		Maserati 200S I		did not start

- Fastest Lap: Stirling Moss, 42:17.5secs (63.842 mph)

=== Class Winners ===
Class	Winners		
Sports 3000	106	Ferrari 250 TR 58	Musso / Gendebien
Sports 2000	90	Ferrari 500 TRC	Starrabba / Cortesse
Sports 1500	68	Porsche 718 RSK	Behra / Scarlatti
Sports 1100	58	Raor-Fiat 1100 Special	di Salvo / Minneci
Grand Touring 3000		no classified finishers	
Grand Touring 2600	42	Fiat 8V	Montalbano / Bologna
Grand Touring 1600	26	Porsche 356A Carrera 1500 GS	Pucci / von Hanstein
Grand Touring 1300	24	Alfa Romeo Giuletta Sprint Veloce	Todaro / “Nessuno”

== Standings after the race ==
Pos	Championship	Points
1	(Italy) Ferrari	24
2	(West Germany) Porsche	14
3	(United Kingdom) Lotus	3
4	(Italy) Osca	2

Championship points were awarded for the first six places in each race in the order of 8-6-4-3-2-1, excepting the RAC Tourist Trophy, for which points were awarded 4-3-2-1 for the first four places. Manufacturers were only awarded points for their highest finishing car with no points awarded for positions filled by additional cars. Only the best 4 results out of the 6 races could be retained by each manufacturer.

World Sportscar Championship
Previous race: 12 Hours of Sebring	1958 season	Next race: 1000 km Nürburgring
