= 1958 12 Hours of Sebring =

Sports car endurance race

Sebring International Raceway in 1952-1966

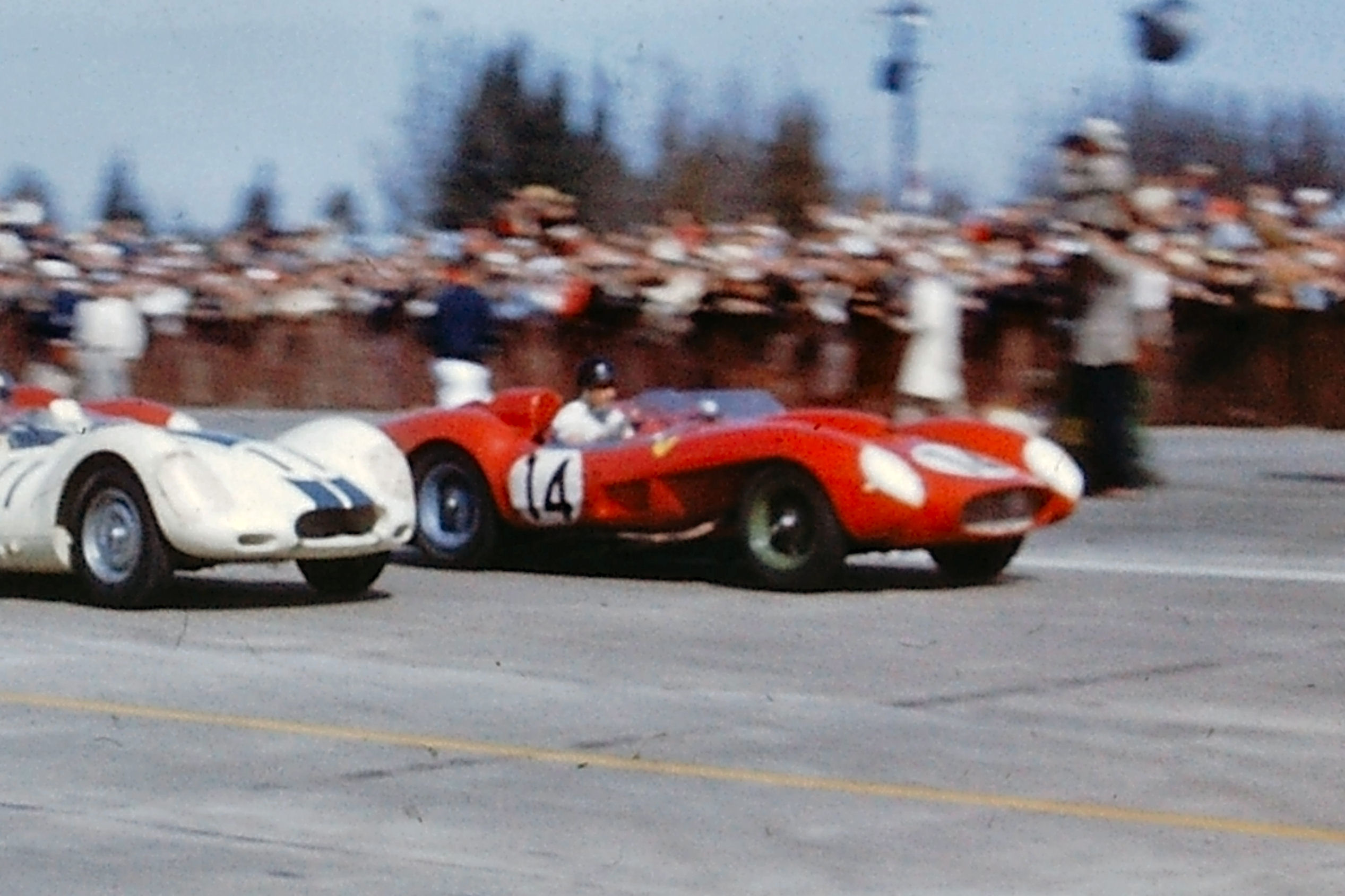
The race was won by the #14 Ferrari 250 TR58 driven by Phil Hill and Peter Collins

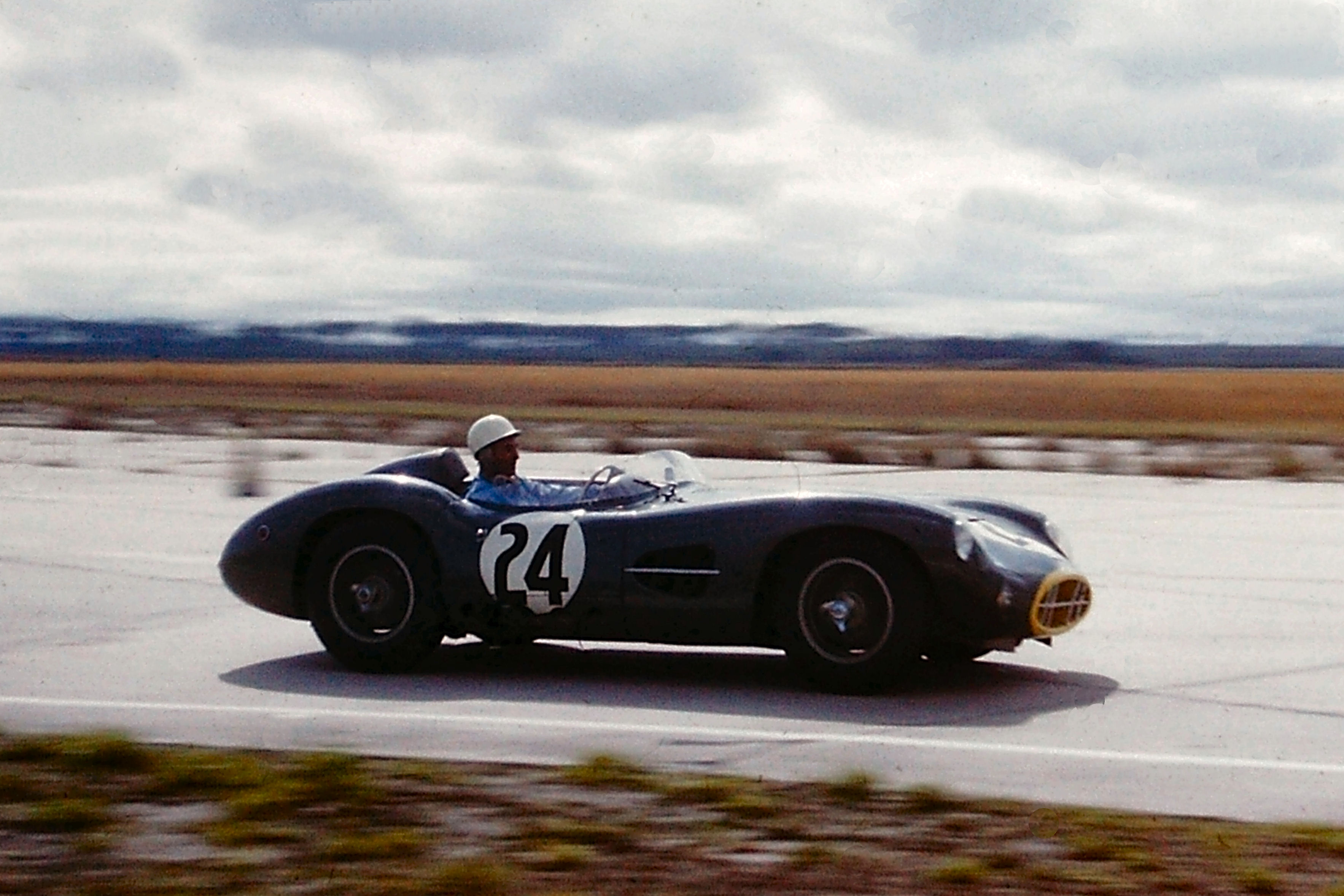
Stirling Moss in Aston Martin DBR1

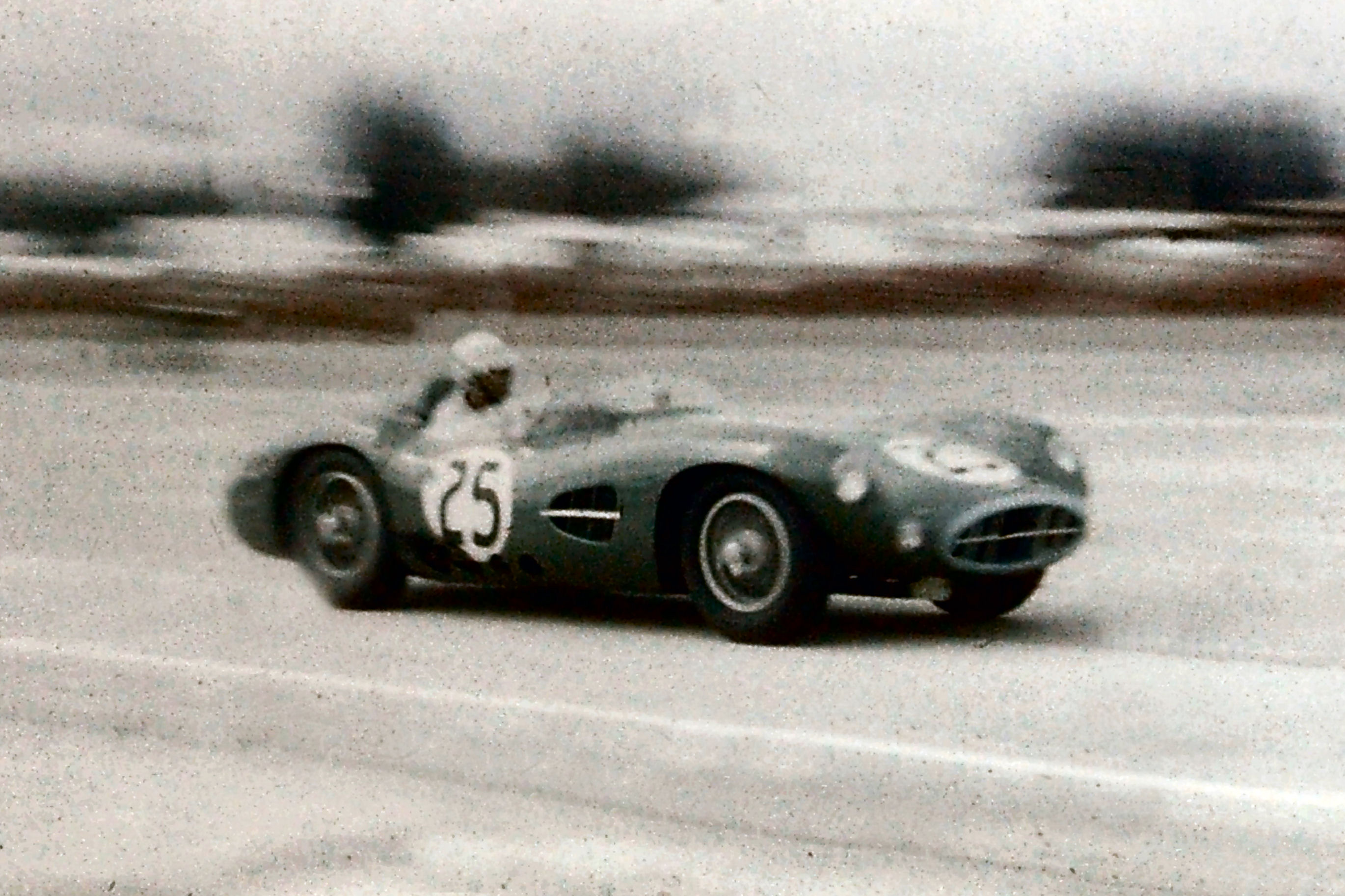
Caroll Shelby in Aston Martin DBR1

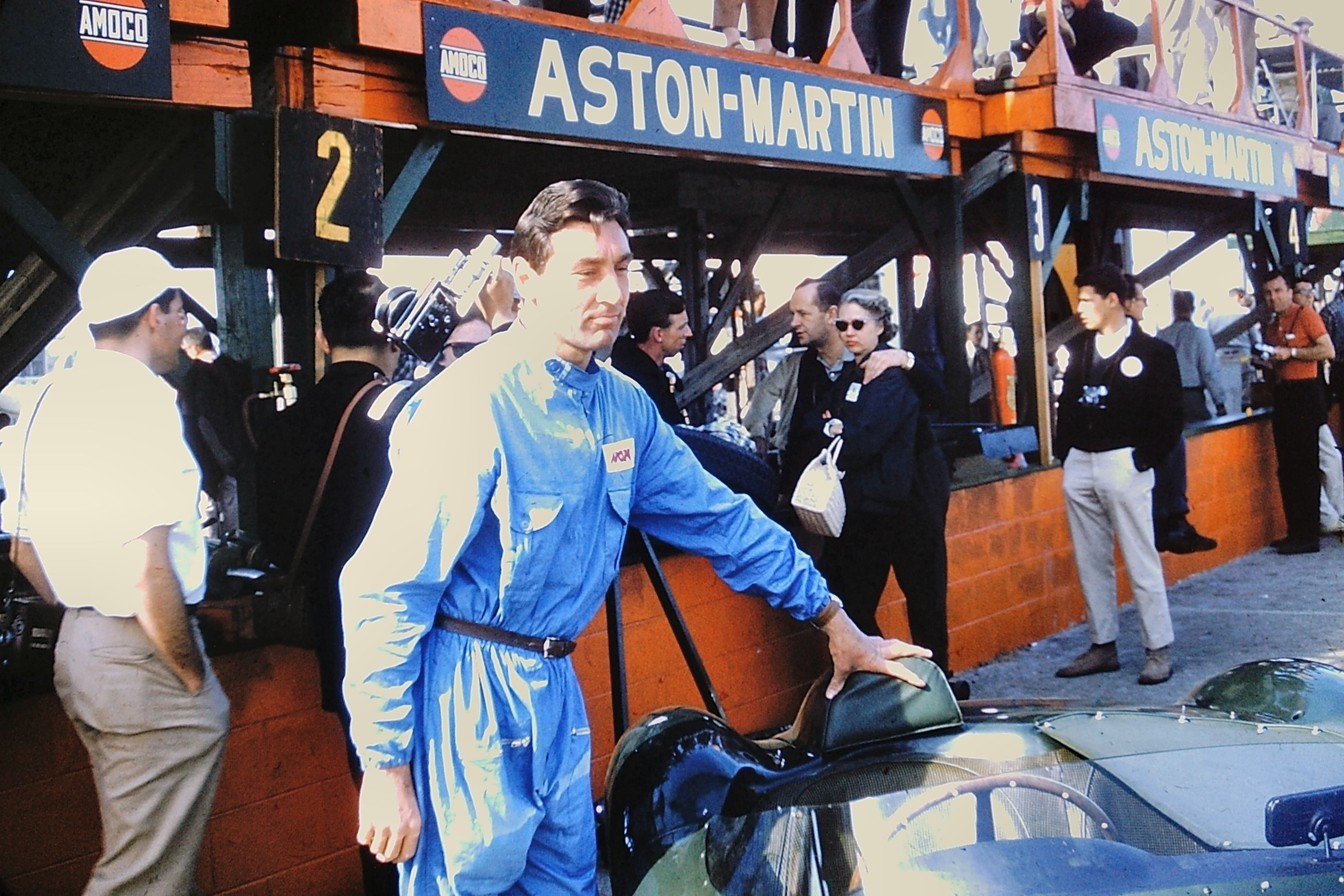
Roy Salvadori and the Aston Martin DBR1

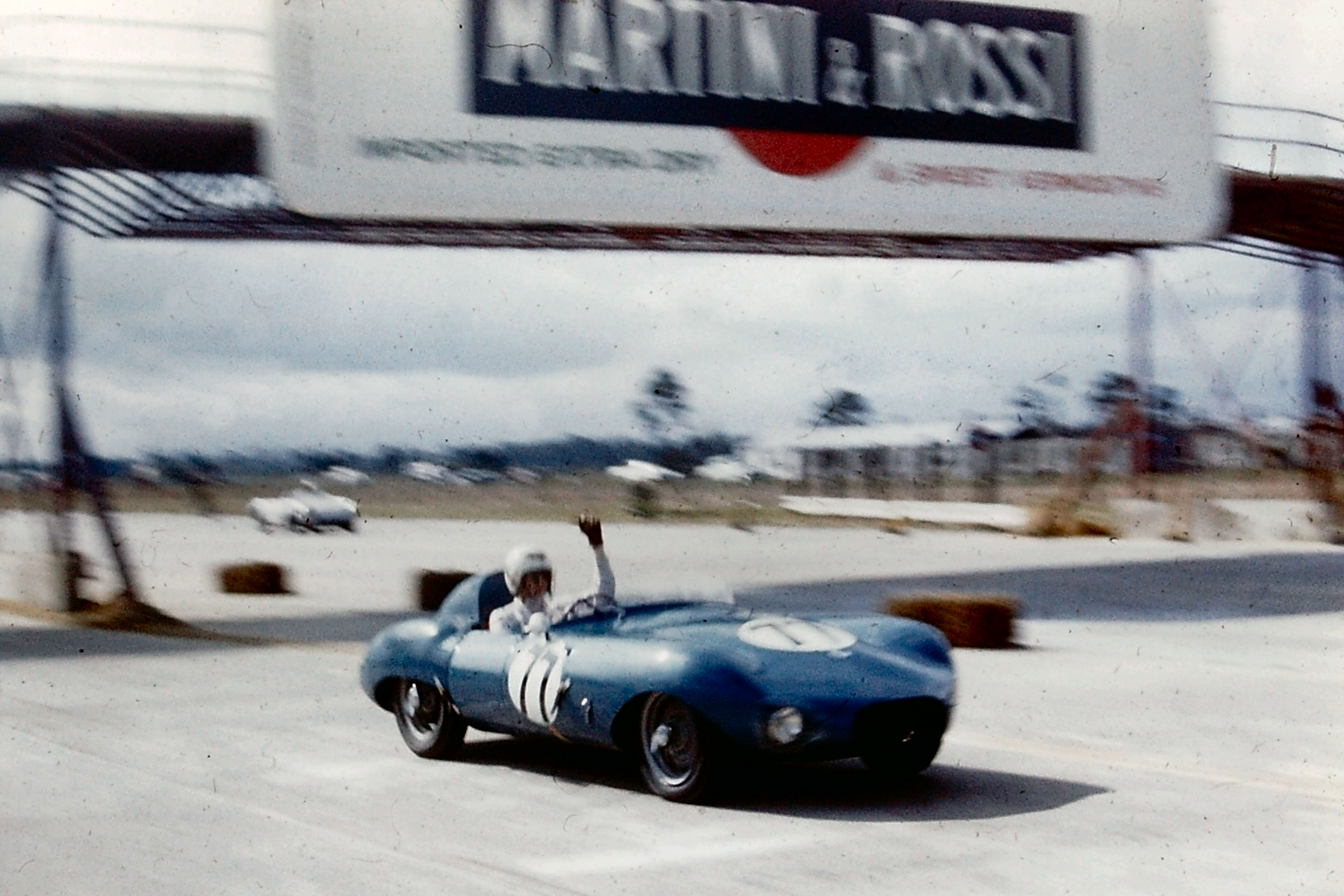
The Elva-Climax MkIII of Kurtz and Patterson

The 1958 12-Hour Florida International Grand Prix of Endurance for the Amoco Trophy took place on 22 March, on the Sebring International Raceway, (Florida, United States). It was the second round of the F.I.A. World Sports Car Championship, which was running to new regulations introduced at the beginning of the season. The most influential of these regulations changes would be the 3.0 litre engine size limit. This was seventh running of the 12-hour race.

== Report ==
=== Entry ===
A massive total of 73 racing cars were registered for this event, of which 70 arrived for practice. Only these, 65 qualified for, and started the race. With these new rules, and Maserati on the brink of financial crisis, Scuderia Ferrari would head the Italian challenge. Ferrari had six of their 250 TRs in Florida, of which three were works machines for Phil Hill/Peter Collins, Mike Hawthorn/Wolfgang von Trips and Luigi Musso/Olivier Gendebien. Opposition would no longer come from Maserati... but from Aston Martin.

David Brown sent two Aston Martin DBR1s over from England for Stirling Moss/Tony Brooks and Carroll Shelby and Roy Salvadori. There were supported by George Constantine and John Dalton, in a DB2/4. Also on the entry list were some quick looking Jaguar D-Types though the Coventry marque were a bit out-classed by now. Ecurie Ecosse had two D-Types for Ron Flockhart/Masten Gregory and Ninian Sanderson/Ivor Bueb. Another Jag was entered by Briggs Cunningham for himself and Walt Hansgen. Cunningham also brought along two Jaguar engined Listers for Ed Crawford/Pat O'Connor and Archie Scott Brown/Hansgen. All three cars were listed with Alfred Momo being the entrant.

=== Qualifying ===
Because there were no qualifying sessions to set the grid, the starting positions were decided according to engine size with the 4.6 litre Chevrolet Corvette C1 of Jim Rathmann and Dick Doane in first place. Next was another Corvette of John A. Kilborn, Fred Windridge and Dick Thompson. In fact Corvette’s held the first three places.

=== Race ===
Day of the race would be sunny and warm, but the start of race was something of a shambles as some drivers posed for the tradition Le Mans style start, ready to sprint to their cars, while others were still ambling across the track. This prompted a false start, so everyone had to line-up again.

From his third place of the grid, Jim Jeffords was expected to be quick off the line, and indeed he was but a wheel problem stopped him out on the circuit, and by the end of lap one, he crossed the line in last place.

The Aston Martins set the early pace with Moss going out in front. Hawthorn was second in his works Ferrari, with Salvadori in the other Aston on his tail. Soon, Salvadori moved past Hawthorn to make it an Aston 1-2. As for the Listers, they were going well in the opening laps, but Gendebien tried to force his Ferrari past Scott Brown, on the managed to climb right over the back of the Lister. Both drivers hopped out and removed the Ferrari and the Belgian took it back to the pits for repairs while the Lister retired. As for the other Lister, it only managed six laps before its Jaguar engine went and all the Jaguar-powered cars were out of the race by lap 55.

As for the Hill/Collins Ferrari, it made a cautious start with the American behind the wheel. The crew decided to be easy on the gearbox and brakes which get worked so hard at Sebring. They were in fourth at the end of the first hour, with Moss/Brooks leading from Salvadori/Shelby and Hawthorn/von Trips. Their easy pace allowed the private 250 TR of Richie Ginther and Johnny von Neumann into fourth an hour later. The pair of Astons and the trio of Ferrari held the top five spots for the first four hours. The other works Ferrari of Musso/Gendebien started to recover from its early encounter.

It was all change in the fifth hour of the race when both Astons had gearbox troubles, which forces them to retire. Hill and Collins had progressively worked their way through to second and then took over the lead which they would not be moved. By the half-way mark, there were four Ferraris in the top four and that remained that way for the next five hours. Hawthorn and von Trips were out on lap 159, with Neumann and Ginther at lap 168. Hill and Collins still kept to a steady pace, the Musso/Gendebien car moved into second with the Porsche 718 RSK of Harry Schell and Wolfgang Seidel now up to third. Surprisingly, the little Lotus Eleven of Sam Weiss and David Tallakson had got into fourth overall.

And that's how the race finished, the Scuderia Ferrari of Collins and Hill, winning ahead of their team-mates Musso and Gendebien. Car number 14, took an impressive victory, completing 200 laps, covering 1,040 miles after 12 hours of racing, averaging a speed of 86.501 mph. Second place went to the second Ferrari, albeit one lap adrift. The podium was complete by works Porsche of Schell and Seidel who were seven laps behind the winners. Phil Hill and Peter Collins had established the Ferrari 250 TR as the main sports car championship contender, with its second straight victory in the series.

== Official Classification ==
Class Winners are in Bold text.

Pos	No	Class	Drivers		Entrant	Chassis	Laps	Reason Out
1st	**14**	**S3.0**	(United States) **Phil Hill**	(United Kingdom) **Peter Collins**	**Scuderia Ferrari**	**Ferrari 250 TR 58**	**12hr 01:22.6, 200**	
2nd	16	S3.0	(Italy) Luigi Musso	(Belgium) Olivier Gendebien	Scuderia Ferrari	Ferrari 250 TR 58	199	
3rd	**41**	**S2.0**	(United States) **Harry Schell**	(West Germany) **Wolfgang Seidel**	**Porsche K.G.**	**Porsche 718 RSK**	**193**	
4th	**56**	**S1.1**	(United States) **Sam Weiss**	(United States) **Dave Tallaksen**	**Team Lotus**	**Lotus-Climax Eleven**	**179**	
5th	**22**	**GT3.5**	(United States) **Paul O'Shea** (United States) **David Cunningham**	(United States) **Bruce Kessler**	**North American Racing Team**	**Ferrari 250 GT LWB Berlinetta**	**179**	
6th	55	S1.1	(United Kingdom) Colin Chapman	(United Kingdom) Cliff Allison	Team Lotus	Lotius-Climax Eleven	179	
7th	21	GT3.5	(United States) George Arents (United States) Don O'Dell	(United States) George Reed	North American Racing Team	Ferrari 250 TR 58	175	
8th	**60**	**S750**	(Argentina) **Alejandro de Tomaso** (United States) Robert Ferguson	(United States) **Isabelle Haskell**	**Automobili Osca**	**Osca S750**	**175**	
9th	54	S1.1	(United States) Jay Chamberlain	(United States) William Frost	Team Lotus	Lotus-Climax Eleven	175	
10th	**43**	**GT1.6**	(West Germany) **Huschke von Hanstein** (United States) **John Cuevas**	(West Germany) **Herbert Linge**	**Porsche K.G.**	**Porsche 356A Carrera**	**174**	
11th	30	S2.0	(Dominican Republic) Porfirio Rubirosa (United States) William Helburn	(France) Jean-François Malle	Porfirio Rubirosa	Ferrari 500 TRC	172	
12th	**1**	**GT5.0**	(United States) **Jim Rathmann**	(United States) **Dick Doane**	**Richard Doane**	**Chevrolet Corvette C1**	**170**	
13th	**47**	**S1.5**	(United States) **Hal Stetson** (United States) **Harry Beck**	(United States) **Otto Linton**	**Osca Automobili**	**Osca MT4 1500**	**170**	
14th	27	S2.0	(United States) Gilbert Geitner (United States) Harold Kunz	(United States) Phil Stiles	Hmbro Automotive Corporation	Auston-Healey 100-6 MM	169	
DNF	17	S3.0	(United States) Johnny von Neumann	(United States) Richie Ginther	Johnny von Neumann	Ferrari 250 TR	168	Gearbox
15th	72	S2.0	(United States) Luke Stear (United States) Bob Harris	(United States) Mike Norris	A. C. Car Ltd	AC Ace	168	
16th	39	S2.0	(United States) Fred Fuller (United States) Tony Briggs	(United States) Art Tweedale	A. C. Car Ltd	AC Ace	166	
17th	28	GT3.5	(United States) William Kinchloe	(United States) Fred Moore	Hambro Automotive Corporation	Austin-Healey 100-6 MM	166	
18th	50	GT1.3	(Mexico) Fred van Beuren	(Mexico) Javier Velásquez	Fred van Beuren	Alfa Romeo Giuletta Spider Veloce	164	
19th	**37**	**GT2.0**	(United States) **Richard Milo** (United States) **Duncan Forlong**	(United States) **George McClure**	**A. C. Car Ltd**	**AC Ace**	**163**	
20th	34	GT2.0	(United States) Mike Rothschild (United States) Bill Lott	(United States) William Kimberly	Standard Motor Co.	Triumph TR3	160	
21st	53	S1.1	(United States) Carl Haas (United States) Chuck Dietrich	(United States) Alan Ross	Behm Motors	Stanguellini S1100 Bialbero	160	
DNF	15	S3.0	(United Kingdom) Mike Hawthorn	(West Germany) Wolfgang von Trips	Scuderia Ferrari	Ferrari 250 TR 58	159	Gearbox
22nd	38	S2.0	(United States) Bill Love (United States) George Crowder	(United States) Roy Jackson-Moore	A. C. Car Ltd	AC Ace	159	
23rd	29	GT3.5	(United States) Gus Ehrman	(United States) Ray Cuomo	Hambro Automotive Corporation	Austin-Healey 100-6 MM	159	
24th	52	GT1.3	(United States) Charlie Rainville	(United States) Jake Kaplan	Jake Kaplan	Alfa Romeo Giuletta Spider Veloce	157	
25th	46	S1.5	(United States) Charles Wallace (United States) Skip Hudson	(United States) Bob Holbert	Marshall Motors	Porsche 550 RS	153	
26th	35	GT2.0	(United States) Jim Roberts	(United States) Louis Heuss	Hambro Automotive	Austin-Healey 100 Special	151	
27th	71	S2.0	(Cuba) Manolo Perez de la Mesa (Cuba) Alfonso Gomez-Mena	(Cuba) Santiago González	Scuderia Cuba	Ferrari 500 TRC	151	
28th	78	S1.1	(United States) William Milliken, Jr. (United States) Cameron Argetsinger	(United States) Millard Ripley	Ripley Motor Co.	Elva-Climax Mk. II	151	
29th	61	S750	(United States) Howard Brown	(United States) Richard Toland	Richard Toland	D.B. HBR Panhard	151	
30th	63	S750	(United States) Jack Brumby (United States) Ray Martinez	(United States) Frank Aldhous	Emmanuel de Graffenried	Fiat-Abarth 750 Zagato	150	
31st	**66**	**GT750**	(United States) **Chuck Kessigner** **(Italy) Alfonso Thiele**	(United States) **Willie West**	**Emmanuel de Graffenried**	**Fiat-Abarth 750 Zagato**	**148**	
32nd	80	GT750	(United States) Harry Fry	(United States) Lou Rappaport	Dr. Harry Fry	Fiat-Abarth 750 Zagato	145	
33rd	2	GT5.0	(United States) John Kilbourn (United States) Dick Thompson	(United States) Fred Windridge	Richard Thompson	Chevrolet Corvette	144	
34th	62	S750	(United States) Howard Hanna	(United States) Howard Brown	Howard Hanna	D.B. HBR Panhard	143	
35th	40	GT2.0	(United States) Max Goldman (United States) Sydney H. Arnolt	(United States) Ralph Durbin	S. H. Arnolt	Arnolt Bolide	141	
NC 36th	33	GT2.0	(United States) Bob Oker	(United States) Harold Hurtley	Standard Motor Co.	Triumph TR3	131	
NC 37th	51	GT1.3	(United States) Louis Comito (United States) Bob Pfaff	(United States) Alan Markelson	Louis Comito	Alfa Romeo Giuletta Spider Veloce	126	
DNF	31	S2.0	(Switzerland) Gaston Andrey	(United States) Bill Lloyd	Mike Garber	Ferrari 500 TRC	125	Rear axle bearing
DNF	65	S750	(United States) Densie McCluggage	(United States) Ruth Levy	Alfred Momo	Fiat-Abarth 750 Zagato	116	Gearbox
DNF	57	S1.1	(United States) Frank Baptista (United States) Bill Warren	(United States) Burdette Martin	Elva Engineering Co.	Elva-Climax Mk. III	114	unknown
NC	49	S1.5	(United States) Charles Moran	(United States) Paul Ceresole	Charles Moran, Jr.	Lotus-Climax Eleven Le Mans	110	
NC	74	S1.5	(United States) Norman Scott	(United States) Frank Bott	Norman J. Scott	Porsche 550 RS	109	
DNF	44	S1.5	(United States) Art Bunker	(Netherlands) Carel Godin de Beaufort	Art’s Sports Motors	Porsche 550 RS	106	Clutch
DNF	42	S2.0	(France) Jean Behra	(East Germany) Edgar Barth	Porsche K.G.	Porsche 718 RSK	105	Transmission, oil leak
DNF	7	S3.0	(United States) Dale Duncan	(Sweden) Jo Bonnier	A. V. Dayton	Maserati 300S	90	Gearbox
DNF	24	S3.0	(United Kingdom) Stirling Moss	(United Kingdom) Tony Brooks	David Brown	Aston Martin DBR1/300	90	Gearbox
DNF	19	S3.0	(United States) John Fitch	(United States) Ed Hugus	Harry Kullen	Ferrari 250 TR	85	Engine
NC	36	GT2.0	(United States) Dick Kennedy (United States) Charles Sherman	(United States) Tom Payne	Richard Kennedy	Morgan Plus 4	76	
NC	58	S1.1	(United States) William Bradley	(United States) John Bentley	Elva Engineering Co.	Elva-Climax Mk. III	71	
DNF	79	S2.0	(Belgium) Jan de Vroom	(Cuba) Alfonso Gomez-Mena	Alfonso Gomez-Mena	Ferrari 500 TRC	69	Engine
DNF	77	S1.1	(United States) Charles Kurtz (United States) Dean Patterson	(United States) Joachim Kammer	Avant Corp.	Elva-Climax Mk. III	65	Clutch
DNF	25	S3.0	(United States) Carroll Shelby	(United Kingdom) Roy Salvadori	David Brown	Aston Martin DBR1/300	62	Transmission
DNF	45	S1.5	(United Kingdom) Ken Miles	(United States) Jean Pierre Kunstle	Jean Pierre Kunstle	Porsche 550 RS	59	Clutch
DNF	23	S3.0	(United States) E. D. Martin	(Venezuela) Chester Flynn	Chester J. Flynn	Ferrari 250 TR	58	Accident
DNF	9	S3.0	(United Kingdom) Ron Flockhart	(United States) Masten Gregory	Ecurie Ecosse	Jaguar D-Type	55	Engine
DNF	81	S2.0	(United States) Bob Said	(El Salvador) Miguel Rivera	Scuderia Central America	Ferrari 500 TRC	43	Brakes
DNF	3	S3.0	(United States) Jim Jeffords	(United States) Augie Pabst	James Jeffords	Chevrolet Corvette SR-2	27	Rear axle
DNF	8	S3.0	(United Kingdom) Ninian Sanderson	(United Kingdom) Ivor Bueb	Ecurie Ecosse	Jaguar D-Type	22	Valve springs
DNF	12	S3.0	(United States) Briggs Cunningham	(United States) Walt Hansgen	Alfred Momo	Jaguar D-Type	16	Blown piston
DNF	26	GT3.5	(United States) George Constantine	(United Kingdom) John Dalton	David Brown	DB2/4	15	Left rear hub
DNF	32	S2.0	(United States) Jim Kimberly	(United States) Pete Lovely	Jim Kimberly	Maserati 200S I	14	Engine
DNF	11	S3.0	(United States) Ed Crawford	(United States) Pat O'Connor	Alfred Momo	Lister-Jaguar	6	Cracked block
DNF	10	S3.0	(United Kingdom) Archie Scott Brown	(United States) Walt Hansgen	Alfred Momo	Lister-Jaguar	3	Accident
DNS	48	S1.5	(United States) M. R. J. Wyllie (United States) Margaret Wyllie	(United States) Chuck Dietrich	Dr. M. R. J. Wyllie	Elva-Climax Mk. II		Accident in practice

- Fastest Lap: Stirling Moss, 3:20.0secs (93.600 mph)

=== Class Winners ===
Class	Winners		
Sports 3000 – Class D	14	Ferrari 250 TR 58	Hill / Collins
Sports 2000 – Class E	41	Porsche 718 RSK	Schell / Seidel
Sports 1500 – Class F	47	Osca MT4 1500	Stetson / Linton / Beck
Sports 1100 – Class G	56	Lotus-Climax Eleven	Weiss / Tallaksen
Sports 750	60	Osca S750	de Tomasso / Haskell / Ferguson
Grand Touring 5000	1	Chevrolet Corvette	Rathmann / Doane
Grand Touring 3500 – Class 9	22	Ferrari 250 GT LWB Berlinetta	O'Shea / Kessler / Cunningham
Grand Touring 3000		no classified finishers	
Grand Touring 2000	37	AC Ace	Milo / McClure / Forlong
Grand Touring 1600	43	Porsche 356A Carrera	von Hanstein / Linge / Cuevas
Grand Touring 1300	50	Alfa Romeo Giuletta Spider Veloce	Van Beuren / Velásquez
Grand Touring 750	64	Fiat-Abarth 750 Zagato	Kessinger / West / Thiele

== Standings after the race ==
Pos	Championship	Points
1	(Italy) Ferrari	16
2	(West Germany) Porsche	8
3	(United Kingdom) Lotus	3

- Note: Championship points were awarded for the first six places in each race in the order of 8-6-4-3-2-1, excepting the RAC Tourist Trophy, for which points were awarded on a 4-3-2-1 for the first four places. Manufacturers were only awarded points for their highest finishing car with no points awarded for positions filled by additional cars. Only the best 4 results out of the 6 races could be retained by each manufacturer.

World Sportscar Championship
Previous race: 1000 km Buenos Aires	1958 season	Next race: Targa Florio
