= 1958 1000 km Nürburgring =

Sports car endurance race in Germany

The 4. Internationales ADAC 1000 Kilometer Rennen Nürburgring took place on 1 June, on the Nürburgring Nordschleife, (West Germany). It was also the fourth round of the F.I.A. World Sports Car Championship, which was running to new regulations introduced at the beginning of the season.

Nürburgring Nordschleife

== Report ==
=== Entry ===
A massive total of 72 racing cars were registered for this event, of which 69 arrived for practice. Only these, only 54 started the long-distance race on the 14.174 mile German circuit. The first three events of the season, ended with victory for Scuderia Ferrari. As Hill and Collins also won the last race of the previous season, the Venezuelan Grand Prix Ferrari had now won four races in a row. With these new rules, and Maserati on the brink of financial crisis, Scuderia Ferrari would head the Italian challenge. Ferrari had four works 250 TR 58s in the Eifel mountains, Mike Hawthorn/Peter Collins, Luigi Musso/Phil Hill, Wolfgang von Trips/Olivier Gendebien and Gino Munaron/Wolfgang Seidel. Opposition would no longer come from Maserati... but from Porsche and Aston Martin.

David Brown won the event in 1957 sent along three Aston Martin DBR1 over from England for Stirling Moss/Jack Brabham, Tony Brooks/Stuart Lewis-Evans and Roy Salvadori/Carroll Shelby, while Porsche arrived with two different cars; 550 RS and 718 RSK for their squad of drivers led by Jean Behra and Harry Schell. They were joined a fleet of privateer drivers in their Alfa Romeos, Oscas and other mainline sportscars.

=== Qualifying ===
Qualifying was held over three sessions for a total of 1,710 minutes over the three days prior to the race. The Ferrari 250 TR of Hawthorn took pole position, averaging a speed of 87.484 mph around the 14.173 mile circuit.

=== Race ===
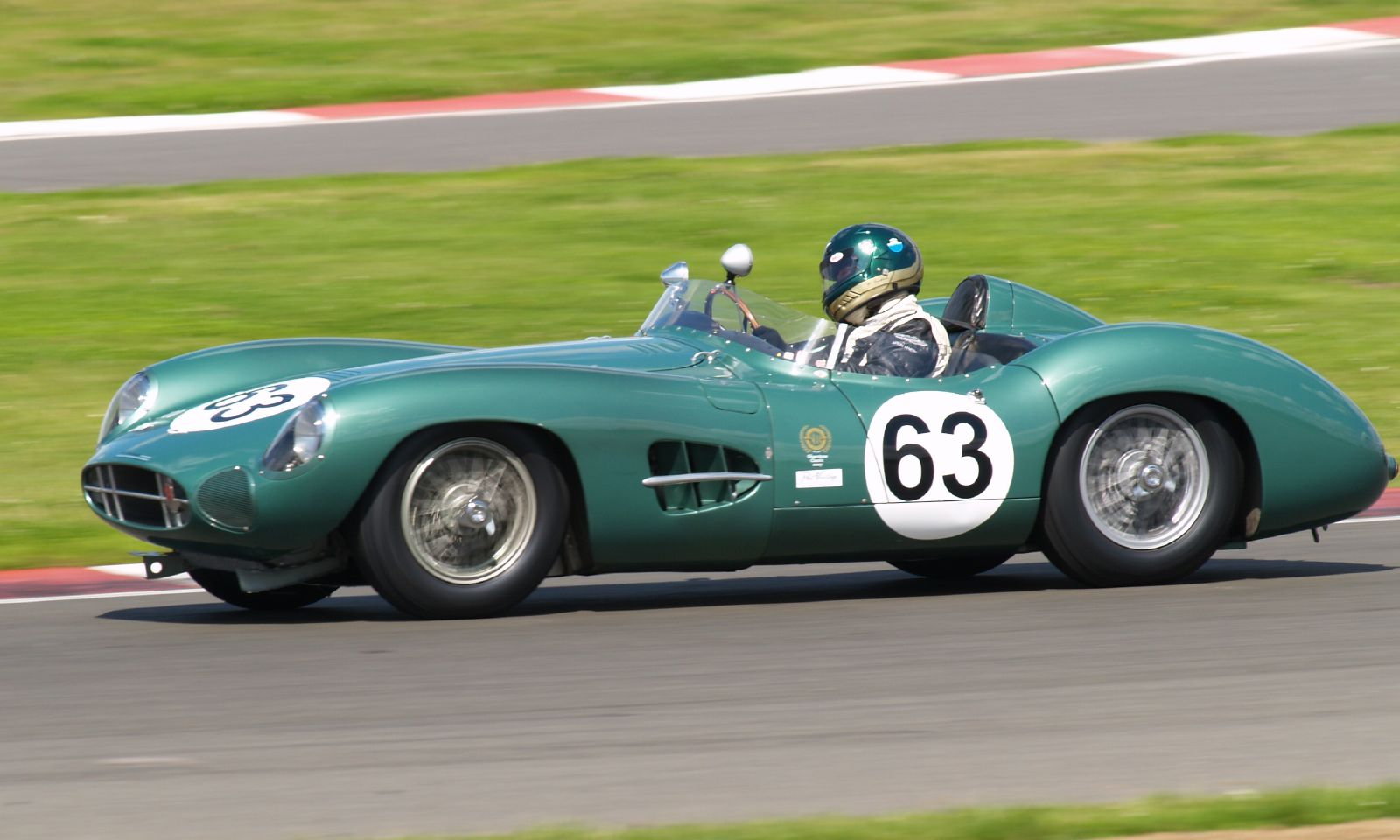
Aston Martin DBR1, similar to that driven by Moss and Brabham to victory

With each lap over 14 miles in length, the race covered a total of 44 laps, or 1,000 kilometres, the Nordschleife was a fearsome thing to behold. The day of the race would be warm and dry, with a crowd of approximately 150,000 in attendance to witness the race.

As for the race victory, this did not go to Scuderia Ferrari, as they were beaten by more than three minutes by the Aston Martin DBR1/300 of Moss and Brabham, gaining the marque their first points of the season and Ferrari's first defeat of the season. The winning partnership, won in a time of 7hr 23:32.0 mins., averaging a speed of 84.360 mph. The margin of triumph over the Ferrari of Hawthorn/Collins was 3 min 44s, who were followed home by their teammates von Trips/Gendebien who were a further 5 min 58s adrift. The works Ferraris took the next two places, meaning they finished 2-3-4-5. Ferrari's second place clinched that year's World Sports Car Championship as with 30 points no other manufacturer could catch them. Stirling Moss's pace was so quick that his fastest lap of the race, was faster than Hawthorn's pole lap. The race continued for another hour to allow the other classes/division to try and complete the full 1000 km. Sadly, Erwin Bauer after being shown the checkered flag, as he did not see it, he continued racing and crashed fatally on what was supposed to be his slowing down lap.

== Official Classification ==
Class Winners are in Bold text.

Pos	No	Class	Driver		Entrant	Chassis	Laps	Reason Out
1st	**1**	**S3.0**	(United Kingdom) **Stirling Moss**	(Australia) **Jack Brabham**	**David Brown, Aston Martin Ltd.**	**Aston Martin DBR1/300**	**7hr 23:33.0**; **44**	
2nd	4	S3.0	(United Kingdom) Mike Hawthorn	(United Kingdom) Peter Collins	Scuderia Ferrari	Ferrari 250 TR 58	7hr 27:17.0; 44	
3rd	7	S3.0	(West Germany) Wolfgang von Trips	(Belgium) Olivier Gendebien	Scuderia Ferrari	Ferrari 250 TR 58	7hr 33:15.0; 44	
4th	5	S3.0	(Italy) Luigi Musso	(United States) Phil Hill	Scuderia Ferrari	Ferrari 250 TR 58	43	
5th	6	S3.0	(West Germany) Wolfgang Seidel	(Italy) Gino Munaron	Scuderia Ferrari	Ferrari 250 TR 58	42	
6th	**22T**	**S1.5**	(West Germany) **Richard von Frankenberg** (East Germany) **Edgar Barth**	(Netherlands) **Carel Godin de Beaufort**	**Porsche KG**	**Porsche 550 RS**	**7hr 46:58.0**; **44**	
7th	21	S1.5	(United States) Harry Schell	(Belgium) Paul Frère	**Dr. Ing. h. c. F. Porsche K. G.**	**Porsche 718 RSK**	**7hr 54:43.0**; **44**	
8th	17	S3.0	(United Kingdom) Graham Whitehead	(United Kingdom) Peter Whitehead	A. G. Whitehead	Aston Martin DB3S	42	
DNF	2	S3.0	(United Kingdom) Tony Brooks	(United Kingdom) Stuart Lewis-Evans	David Brown, Aston Martin Ltd.	Aston Martin DBR1/300	41	Accident
9th	10	S3.0	(United Kingdom) Jack Fairman	(United Kingdom) Jock Lawrence	Ecurie Ecosse	Jaguar D-Type	41	
10th	12	S3.0	(Austria) Gotfrid Köchert	(West Germany) Erwin Bauer	Österreicher Automobil-Sport-Club	Ferrari 250 TR	41	fatal accident over race ended (Bauer)
11th	25	S1.5	(Sweden) Jon Fast	(United Kingdom) John Campbell-Jones	Scuderia Viking Anglo Swedish Racing Team	Osca FS 1500	42	
12th	15	S3.0	(Finland) Curt Lincoln	(Finland) Esko Keinänen	Scuderia Askolin	Ferrari 250 TR	40	
13th	90	S3.0	(West Germany) Herbert Linge	(West Germany) Walfried Winkler	Herbert Linge	Porsche 356	39	
14th	30	S1.5	(West Germany) Harald von Saucken	(West Germany) Georg Bialas	Harald von Saucken	Porsche 356 Speedster	38	
15th	29	S1.5	(United Kingdom) David Piper	(United Kingdom) Keith Greene	David Piper	Lotus-Climax Eleven	38	
15th	**50**	**GT/TS1.6**	**(West Germany) Paul-Ernst Strähle**	**(West Germany) Hans-Joachim Walter**	**Paul-Ernst Strähle**	**Porsche 356A Carrera**	**8hr 27:43.0**; **44**	
17th	52	GT/TS1.6	(West Germany) Fritz Hahnl, Jr.	(West Germany) Helmut Zick	Fritz Hahnl, Jr.	Porsche 356A Carrera	43	
18th	57	GT/TS1.6	(West Germany) Helmut Deutenberg	(West Germany) Wim in der Elst	Helmut Deutenberg	Porsche 356A Carrera	43	
19th	54	GT/TS1.6	(West Germany) Helmut Busch	(Italy) Antonio Pucci	Dr. Helmut Busch	Porsche 356A Speedster	42	
20th	**73**	**GT1.3**	**(Switzerland) Marcel Stern**	**(Switzerland) Paul Vogel**	**Ecurie Le Maute**	**Alfa Romeo Giuletta Sprint Veloce**	**42**	
21st	76	GT1.3	(Portugal) Manuel Nogueira Pinto	(Portugal) Mário Cabral	Manual Nogueria Pinto	Alfa Romeo Giuletta Sprint Veloce	42	
22nd	55	GT/TS1.6	(West Germany) Bruno Runte	(West Germany) Hans Hartzheim	Bruno Runte	Porsche 356A Carrera	42	
23rd	77	GT1.3	(West Germany) Sepp Liebl	(West Germany) Herbert Schultze	Sepp Liebl	Alfa Romeo Giuletta Sprint Veloce	42	
24th	**41**	**GT3.0**	**(Belgium) “Eldé**	**(Belgium) ”Jean Beurlys”**	**Ecurie Francorchamps**	**Ferrari 250 GT LWB Sacglietti**	**42**	
25th	53	GT/TS1.6	(United States) William Wilbourne	(United States) Bill Wuesthoff	William Wilbourne	Porsche 356A Speedster	41	
26th	42	GT3.0	(Italy) Armando Zampiero	(Italy) Luigi Villotti	Scuderia Trentina	Ferrari 250 GT	41	
27th	40	GT3.0	(Finland) Lars Finnilä	(Finland) Fred Geitel	Scuderia Askolin	Ferrari 250 GT LWB	41	
28th	81	GT1.3	(West Germany) Horst Estler	(West Germany) Hans-Helmuth Hespen	Horst Estler	Alfa Romeo Giuletta Sprint Veloce	40	
29th	71	GT1.3	(West Germany) Kurt Ahrens	(West Germany) Richard Trenkel	Kurt Ahrens	Alfa Romeo Giuletta Sprint Veloce	40	
30th	64	GT/TS1.6	(Belgium) Claude Dubois	(Belgium) Telesphore Georges	Claude Dubois	Peugeot 403	37	
DNF	8	S3.0	(United Kingdom) Ivor Bueb	(United Kingdom) Ninian Sanderson	Ecurie Ecosse	Jaguar D-Type	36	Front suspension
DNF	31	S1.5	(United States) Art Bunker	(Switzerland) Heinz Schiller	Ecurie Maarsbergen	Porsche 550 RS	33	Accident
DNF	66	GT/TS1.6	(West Germany) Sepp Greger	(West Germany) Paul Denk	Josef Greger	Porsche 356A Carrera	31	
31st	37	S1.5	(United Kingdom) David Latchford	(United Kingdom) Eugene Hall	Ecurie Dauphin	Halseylec-Climax	30	
32nd	74	GT1.3	(West Germany) Peter Kropf	(West Germany) Samuel Heuer	Ecurie Biennoise	Alfa Romeo Giuletta Sprint Veloce	30	
DNF	9	S3.0	(United States) Masten Gregory	(United Kingdom) Ron Flockhart	Ecurie Ecosse	Jaguar D-Type	29	Accident
DNF	34	S1.5	(Italy) Giulio Cabianca (Sweden) Jo Bonnier	(West Germany) Hans Herrmann	Carl F.W. Borgward GmbH	Borgward Rennsport	29	
DNF	36	S1.5	(United Kingdom) John Horridge	(United Kingdom) Walter Monaco	Dan Margulies	Lotus-Climax Eleven	29	Bodywork
DNF	14	S3.0	(Sweden) Gunnar Carlsson	(Finland) Carl-Otto Bremer	Scuderia Ferrari Svezia Oerebro	Ferrari 750 Monza	28	
DNF	11	S3.0	(Belgium) Willy Mairesse	(Belgium) Alain de Changy	Equipe Nationale Belge	Ferrari 250 TR	26	Accident
DNF	45	GT3.0	(France) François Picard	(United States) Bruce Kessler	François Picard	Ferrari 250 GT LWB	19	Accident
DNF	75	GT1.3	(Switzerland) Karl Foitek	(Switzerland) Renato Sommacal	Karl Foitek	Alfa Romeo Giuletta Sprint Veloce	19	Head gasket
DNF	20	S1.5	(France) Jean Behra	(East Germany) Edgar Barth	Dr. Ing. h. c. F. Porsche K.G.	Porsche 718 RSK	18	Valve
DNF	26	S1.5	(United Kingdom) Gordon Fowell	(United Kingdom) Derek Godfrey	Scuderia Viking Anglo Swedish Racing Team	Osca MT4 1500	16	
DNF	60	GT/TS1.6	(Sweden) Bengt Martenson	(Sweden) Gunnar Andersson	Bengt Martenson	Volvo PV 444	16	
DNF	27	S1.5	(United Kingdom) Bill Frost	(United Kingdom) Bob Hicks	Car Exchange	Lotus-Climax 15	12	Engine
DNF	24	S1.5	(West Germany) Fritz Jüttner	(West Germany) Hans Herrmann	Carl F.W. Borgward GmbH	Borgward Rennsport	8	Gearbox
DNF	62	GT/TS1.6	(West Germany) Fred Albrecht	(West Germany) Rolf Appel	Fred Albrecht	Porsche 356A Carrera	8	
DNF	28	S1.5	(United Kingdom) Jimmy Blumer	(United Kingdom) Chris Power	Car Exchange	Lotus-Climax Eleven	6	Accident
DNF	72	GT1.3	(West Germany) Heinz Friederichs	(West Germany) Rudolf Wilhelm Moser	Heinz Friederichs	Alfa Romeo Giuletta Sprint Veloce	5	
DNF	3	S3.0	(United Kingdom) Roy Salvadori	(United States) Carroll Shelby	David Brown, Aston Martin Ltd.	Aston Martin DBR1/300	2	Gearbox
DNF	23	S1.5	(West Germany) Hans Herrmann	(Sweden) Jo Bonnier	Carl F.W. Borgward GmbH	Borgward Rennsport	0	Engine
DNF	78	GT1.3	(Netherlands) Mathieu Hezemans	(West Germany) Hubert Oebels	Mathieu Hezemans	Alfa Romeo Giuletta Sprint Veloce	0	
DNS	16	S3.0	(Spain) Francisco Godia-Sales	(Sweden) Jo Bonnier	Francisco Godia	Maserati 300S		
DNS	18	S3.0	(Sweden) Ulf Norinder		Norinder	Maserati 200S I		
DNS	22	S1.5	(Italy) Giorgio Scarlatti (Netherlands) Carel Godin de Beaufort	(West Germany) Richard von Frankenberg	Dr. Ing. h. c. F. Porsche K.G.	Porsche 718 RSK		Accident in practice
DNS	33	S1.5	(Switzerland) Stefan Brugger	(Switzerland) Fausto Meyrat	Stefan Brugger	DKW Junior		
DNS	35	S1.5	(Belgium) Pierre Berchem		Pierre Berchem	Lotus-Climax Eleven		
DNS	44	GT3.0	(United States) Bruce Kessler		El Salvador Central America Tegards	Ferrari 250 GT		
DNS	56	GT/TS1.6	(United Kingdom) Jim Clark	(West Germany) Wolfgang Niessen	Bruno Runte	Porsche 356A Carrera		
DNS	58	GT/TS1.6	(Sweden) Arne Lindberg	(Sweden) Ake Lindqvist	Arne Lindberg	Porsche 356A Carrera		
DNS	59	GT/TS1.6	(United Kingdom) Robin Carnegie	(United Kingdom) D.J. Hayles	Fitzwilliam Racing Team	MG A		Fuel leak
DNS	61	GT/TS1.6	(West Germany) Hans Harzheim	(Brazil) Christian Heins	H. Harzheim	Porsche 356A Carrera		
DNS	63	GT/TS1.6	(Monaco) André Testut	(France) Jean Sibile	Ecurie Monte Carlo Louis Chiron	Porsche 356A Carrera		
DNS	65	GT/TS1.6	(West Germany) Ludwig Blendl	(West Germany) Siegfried Günther	Ludwig Blendl	Porsche 356A Carrera		
DNS	82	GT1.3	(Sweden) Harald Kronegård	(Sweden) Sten Bielke	Harald Kronegård	Alfa Romeo Giuletta Sprint Veloce		

- Fastest Lap: Stirling Moss, 9:43.0secs (87.521 mph)

=== Class Winners ===
Class	Winners		
Sports 3000	1	Aston Martin DBR1/300	Moss / Brabham
Sports 1500	22T	Porsche 550A RS	von Frankenberg / de Beaufort / Barth
Grand Touring 3000	41	Ferrari 250 GT LWB Scaglietti	“Eldé” / “Beurlys”
GT/Special Touring 1600	50	Porsche 356A Carrera	Strähle / Walter
Grand Touring 1300	73	Alfa Romeo Giuletta Sprint Veloce	Liebl / Schultze

== Standings after the race ==
Pos	Championship	Points
1	(Italy) Ferrari	30
2	(West Germany) Porsche	15
3	(United Kingdom) Aston Martin	8
4	(United Kingdom) Lotus	3
5	(Italy) Osca	2

- Note: Only the top five positions are included in this set of standings.
  Championship points were awarded for the first six places in each race in the order of 8-6-4-3-2-1, excepting the RAC Tourist Trophy, for which points were awarded on a 4-3-2-1 for the first four places. Manufacturers were only awarded points for their highest finishing car with no points awarded for positions filled by additional cars. Only the best 4 results out of the 6 races could be retained by each manufacturer. Points earned but not counted towards the championship totals are listed within brackets in the above table.

World Sportscar Championship
Previous race: Targa Florio	1958 season	Next race: 24 Hours of Le Mans
