= 1958 RAC Tourist Trophy =

Sports car racing

The 1958 RAC Tourist Trophy took place on 13 September on the Goodwood Circuit (England). It was also the sixth and final round of the F.I.A. World Sports Car Championship. This was the first time the RAC Tourist Trophy had taken place since 1955, following the death of three drivers during the race that year.

Goodwood Circuit

== Report ==
=== Entry ===
A grand total 36 racing cars were registered for this event, of which 29 arrived for practice and qualifying. Scuderia Ferrari, did entry one car for the event, 250 TR 58, but were among those who did not arrive, perhaps the disinterest from Maranello was due to the lack of drivers and the fact that their victory at Le Mans had given them the Championship. The event also did not attract the Belgian equipes. The entry was therefore headed by the three works Aston Martins, entered under the name of David Brown Ltd. Their DBR1/300s were from Stirling Moss/Tony Brooks, Carroll Shelby/Stuart Lewis-Evans and Roy Salvadori/Jack Brabham.

=== Qualifying ===
The Aston Martin DBR1/300 of Stirling Moss took pole position, averaging a speed of 93.913 mph around the 2.4 mile circuit.

=== Race ===
Of the 29 starters, only the three Astons were considered the potential winners, and so it proved as they finished in the first three places, winning the Team Awards in the process. The winning partnership of Moss/Brooks won in a time of 4hr 01:17.0mins., averaging a speed of 88.324 mph. They covered a distance of 355.2 miles. Just 0.4 seconds behind came Salvadori/Brabham, with Shelby/Lewis-Evans the same margin adrift in complete the podium.

== Official Classification ==
Class Winners are in Bold text.

Pos	No	Class	Driver		Entrant	Chassis	Laps	Reason Out
1st	**7**	**S3.0**	(United Kingdom) **Stirling Moss**	(United Kingdom) **Tony Brooks**	**David Brown Ltd.**	**Aston Martin DBR1/300**	**4hrs 01:17.000, 148**	
2nd	9	S3.0	(United Kingdom) Roy Salvadori	(Australia) Jack Brabham	David Brown Ltd.	Aston Martin DBR1/300	4hrs 01:17.400, 148	
3rd	8	S3.0	(United States) Carroll Shelby	(United Kingdom) Stuart Lewis-Evans	David Brown Ltd.	Aston Martin DBR1/300	4hrs 01:17.800, 148	
4th	**21**	**S2.0**	(France) **Jean Behra**	(East Germany) **Edgar Barth**	**Dr. Porsche**	**Porsche 718 RSK**	**144**	
5th	4	S3.0	(United States) Masten Gregory	(United Kingdom) Innes Ireland	Ecurie Ecosse	Jaguar D-Type	143	
6th	6	S3.0	(United Kingdom) Duncan Hamilton	(United Kingdom) Peter Blond	Duncan Hamilton	Jaguar D-Type	142	
7th	**42**	**S1.1**	(United Kingdom) **Peter Ashdown**	(United Kingdom) **Gordon Jones**	**Team Lotus**	**Lotus- Climax Eleven**	**138**	
8th	22	S2.0	(Netherlands) Carel Godin de Beaufort	(Brazil) Christian Heins	Dr.Porsche	Porsche 550 RS	135	
9th	12	S3.0	(United Kingdom) Jonathan Sieff	(United Kingdom) Maurice Charles	Jonathan Sieff	Jaguar D-Type	135	
10th	46	S1.1	(United Kingdom) Mike Taylor	(United Kingdom) Keith Greene	Gilby Engineering Co.	Lotus-Climax Lotus-Climax Eleven	134	
11th	50	S1.1	(United Kingdom) Henry Taylor	(United Kingdom) Nicholas Green	J.V. Green	Lotus-Climax Eleven	131	
12th	43	S1.1	(United States) Carl Haas	(United Kingdom) John Brown	Elva Racing Team	Elva-Climax Mk III	131	
13th	27	S1.1	(United Kingdom) Bill Frost	(United Kingdom) Dickie Stoop	Car Exchange Racing Team	Lotus-Climax Eleven	128	
14th	28	S2.0	(United Kingdom) Tommy Bridger	(United Kingdom) Alan Foster	Richard W. Jacobs	MG A Twin Cam	127	
15th	47	S1.1	(United Kingdom) Jack Wescott	(United Kingdom) Peter Arundell	Innes Ireland Ltd.	Lotus-Climax Eleven	125	
16th	49	S1.1	(United Kingdom) Eric Broadley	(United Kingdom) Peter Gammon	E.H. Broadley	Lola-Climax Mk.1	124	
17th	41	S1.1	(United Kingdom) Alan Stacey	(United Kingdom) Keith Hall	Team Lotus	Lotus-Climax Eleven	121	
18th	48	S1.1	(United Kingdom) Douglas Graham	(United Kingdom) Christopher Martyn	Innes Ireland Ltd.	Lotus-Climax Eleven	110	
19th	29	S2.0	(United Kingdom) Mike Anthony	(United Kingdom) Ted Whiteaway	Rudd Racing Team	AC Ace LM	105	
NC	45	S1.1	(United Kingdom) Ian Burgess	(United Kingdom) Robbie MacKenzie-Low	Elva Racing Team	Elva-Climax Mk IV	102	
NC	52	S1.1	(United Kingdom) Jimmy Blumer	(United Kingdom) Stuart Dodd	Jimmy Blumer	Lotus-Climax Eleven	99	
DNF	24	S2.0	(New Zealand) Bruce McLaren	(New Zealand) Syd Jensen	John Coombs Racing Organisation	Lotus-Climax 15	53	Gearbox
DNF	11	S3.0	(New Zealand) Ross Jensen (United Kingdom) Bruce Halford	(United Kingdom) Ivor Bueb	B. Lister Lt Engineering	Lister-Jaguar	51	Suspension
DNF	30	S2.0	(United Kingdom) Cliff Allison	(United Kingdom) Graham Hill	Team Lotus	Lotus-Climax 15	39	Engine
DNF	26	S2.0	(United Kingdom) David Shale	(United Kingdom) John Dalton	M. Trimble	Lotus-Climax Eleven	24	Gearbox
DNF	53	S1.1	(United Kingdom) John Fisher	(United Kingdom) Les Leston	John Fisher	Lotus-Climax Eleven	20	Gearbox
DNF	44	S1.1	(United Kingdom) Ian Raby	(United Kingdom) Eugene Hall	Elva Racing Team	Elva-Climax Mk III	15	Accident
DNF	10	S3.0	(United Kingdom) Ivor Bueb	(United Kingdom) Bruce Halford	B. Lister Lt Engineering	Lister-Jaguar	10	Accident
DNF	25	S2.0	(United Kingdom) Edward Greenall	(United Kingdom) John Campbell-Jones	J. King	Lotus-Climax 15	9	Accident
DNS	3	S3.0	(Belgium) Claude Dubois	(Belgium) Yves Tassin	Equipe Nationale Belge	Lister-Jaguar		Engine

- Fastest Lap: Stirling Moss, 1:32.6 secs (93.305 mph)

=== Class Winners ===
Class	Winners		
Sports +2000	7	Aston Martin DBR1/300	Moss / Brooks
Sports 2000	21	Porsche 718 RSK	Behra / Barth
Sports 1100	42	Lotus-Climax Eleven	Ashdown / Jones

== Standings after the race ==
Pos	Championship	Points
1	(Italy) Ferrari	32 (38)
2	(West Germany) Porsche	18 (20)
3	(United Kingdom) Aston Martin	18
4	(United Kingdom) Lotus	3
5	(Italy) Osca	2

- Note: Only the top five positions are included in this set of standings.

Championship points were awarded for the first six places in each race in the order of 8-6-4-3-2-1, excepting the RAC Tourist Trophy, for which points were awarded on a 4-3-2-1 for the first four places. Manufacturers were only awarded points for their highest finishing car with no points awarded for positions filled by additional cars. Only the best 4 results out of the 6 races could be retained by each manufacturer. Points earned but not counted towards the championship totals are listed within brackets in the above table.

World Sportscar Championship
Previous race: 24 Hours of Le Mans	1958 season	Next race: 1959 12 Hours of Sebring
