= 1958 World Sportscar Championship =

Racing tournament

Seasons
- ← 1957 1959 →

The 1958 World Sportscar Championship was a motor racing series for sportscars which ran from 26 January to 13 September 1958 and comprised six races in six countries. It was the sixth World Sportscar Championship.

The championship was won by Ferrari.

== Season ==
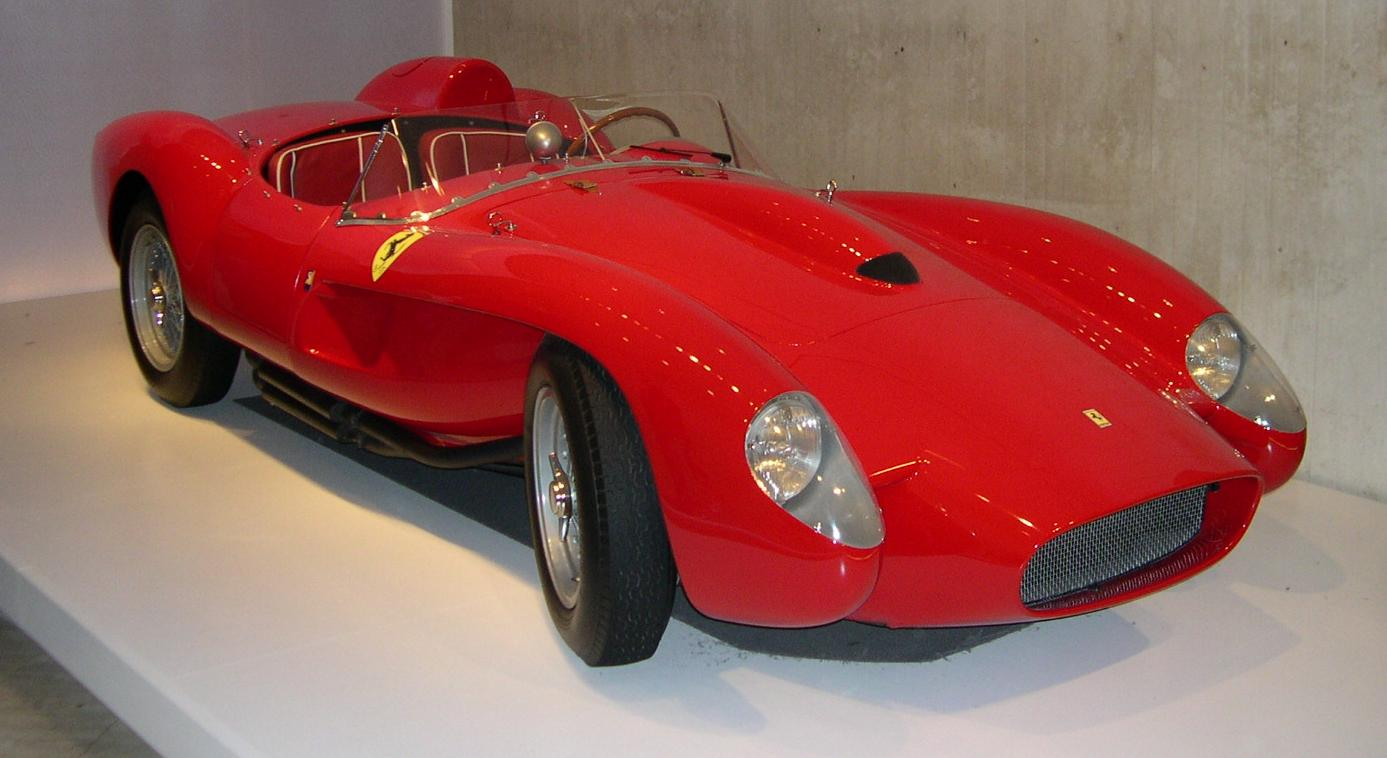
Ferrari won the championship with the 250 TR 58

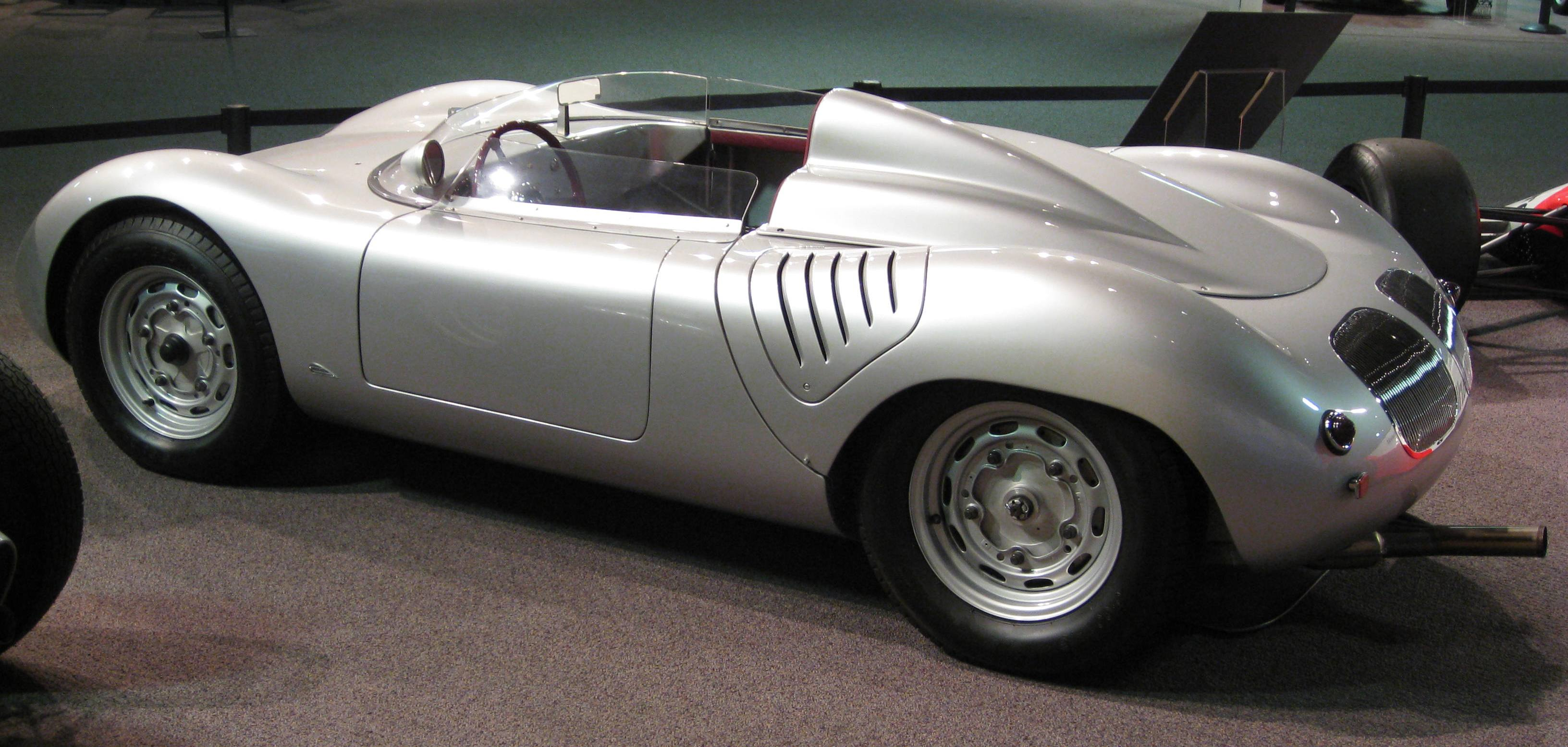
Porsche placed second with the 718 RSK (pictured) and the 550A RS

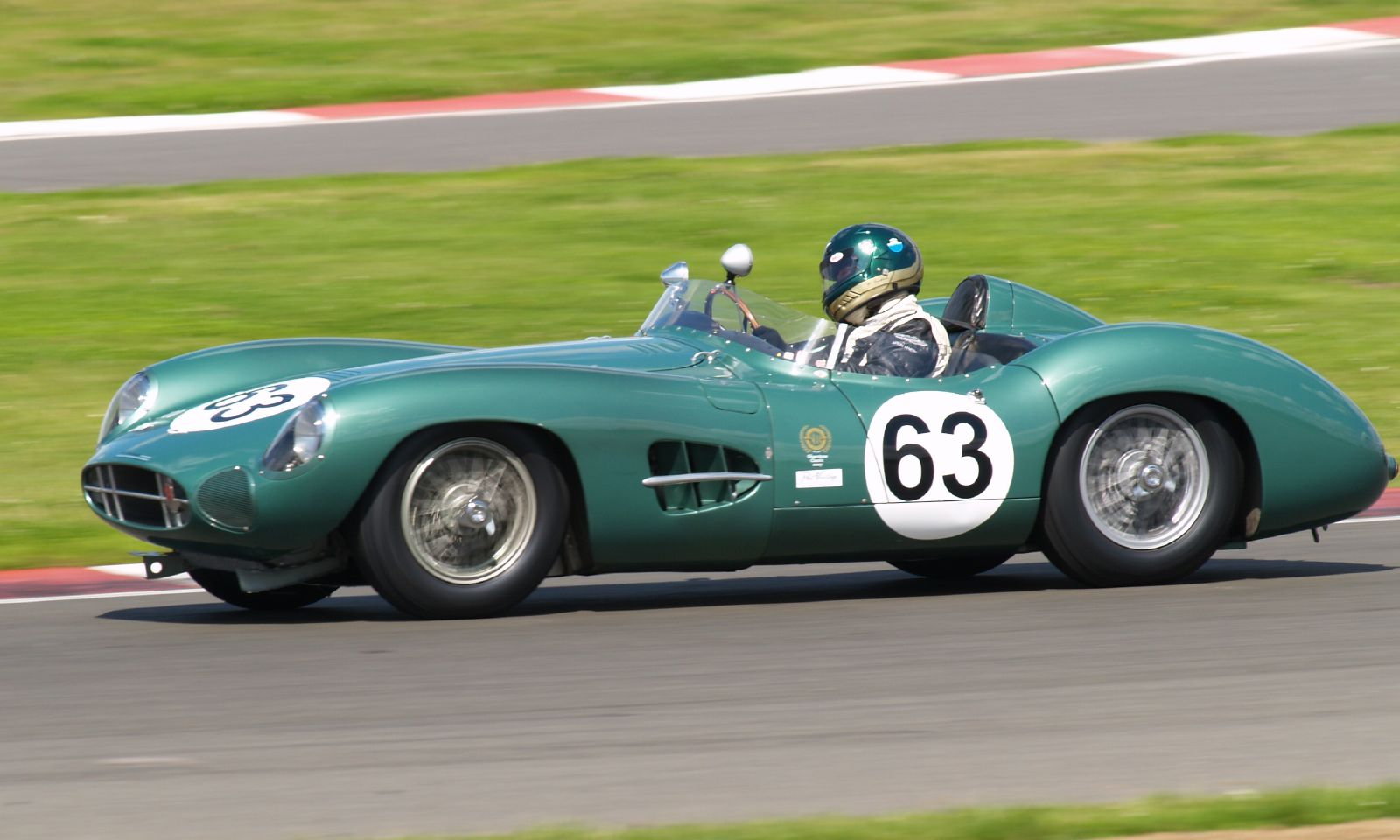
Aston Martin placed third with the DBR1/300 (pictured) and the DB3S

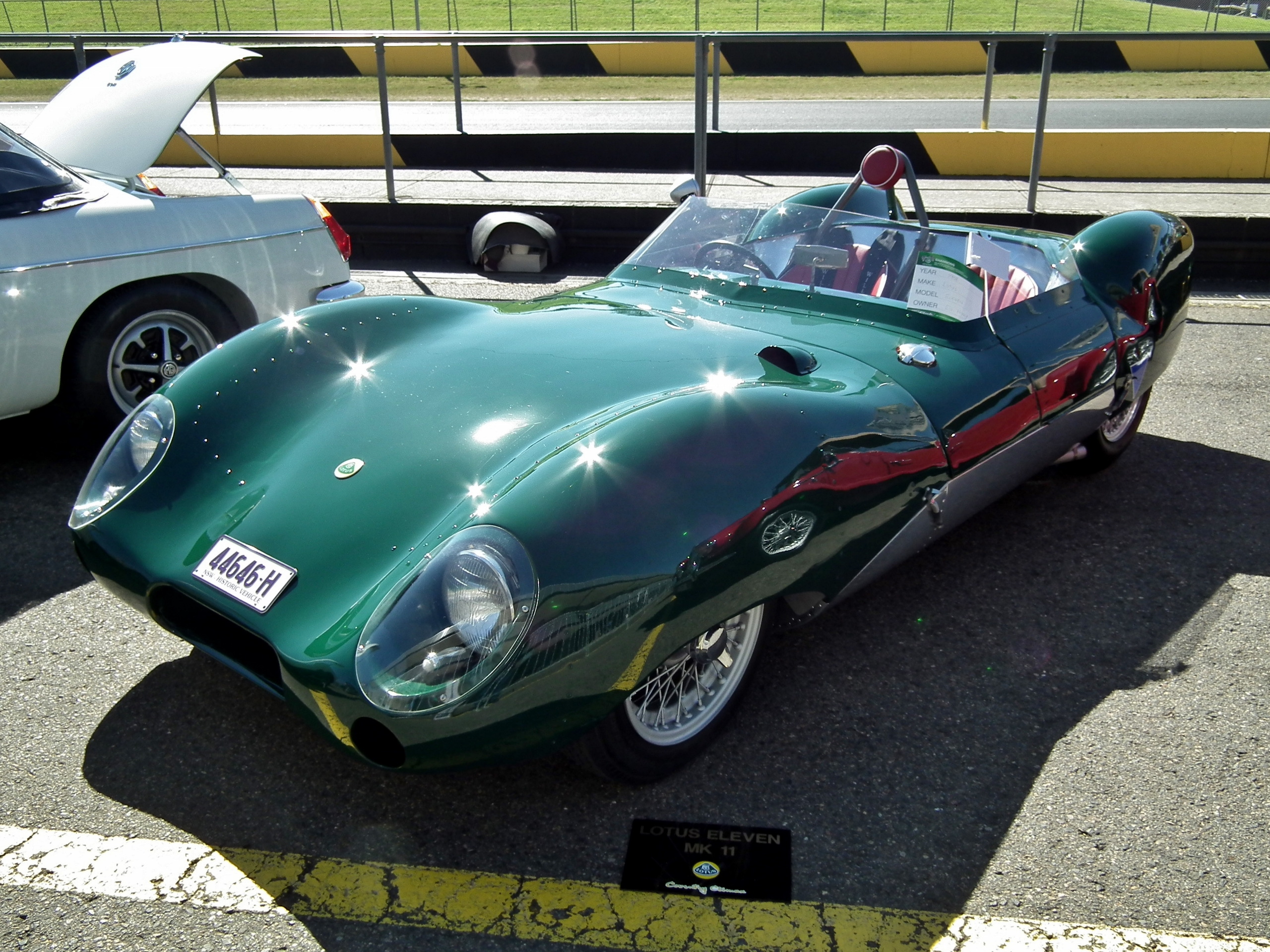
Lotus placed fourth with the Lotus Eleven.

After major accidents at the 1955 Les 24 Heures du Mans and 1957 Mille Miglia, the sport's governing body, F.I.A. and its Commission Sportive Internationale (CSI) dictated several technical changes to the 1958 Sports Car regulations with engine capacity now limited to three litres. Although Le Mans continued, the Mille Miglia was never run in its original format again and was dropped from the calendar, with the Sicilian Targa Florio replacing it as the Italian round of the championship.

This allowed Scuderia Ferrari to dominate the season, as Maserati withdrew from motor racing, leaving Aston Martin and Porsche as the main opposition, but as the previous seasons, the majority of the fields were made up of amateur or gentlemen drivers, often up against professional racing drivers with experience in Formula One.

== Season results ==
=== Race results ===
Round	Date	Event	Circuit or Location	Winning driver	Winning team	Winning car	Results
1	January 26	(Argentina) 1000km of Buenos Aires	Autódromo Municipal-Avenida Paz	(United Kingdom) Peter Collins (United States) Phil Hill	(Italy) Scuderia Ferrari	(Italy) Ferrari 250 TR 58	Results
2	March 22	(United States) 12-Hour Florida International Grand Prix of Endurance for The Amoco Trophy	Sebring International Raceway	(United States) Phil Hill (United Kingdom) Peter Collins	(Italy) Scuderia Ferrari	(Italy) Ferrari 250 TR 58	Results
3	May 11	(Italy) Targa Florio	Circuito Piccolo delle Madonie	(Italy) Luigi Musso (Belgium) Olivier Gendebien	(Italy) Scuderia Ferrari	(Italy) Ferrari 250 TR 58	Results
4	June 1	(West Germany) Internationales ADAC 1000 Kilometre Rennen Nürburgring	Nürburgring	(United Kingdom) Stirling Moss (Australia) Jack Brabham	(United Kingdom) David Brown, Aston Martin Ltd.	(United Kingdom) Aston Martin DBR1/300	Results
5	June 21–22	(France) 24 Heures du Mans	Circuit de la Sarthe	(Belgium) Olivier Gendebien (United States) Phil Hill	(Italy) Scuderia Ferrari	(Italy) Ferrari 250 TR 58	Results
6	September 13	(United Kingdom) RAC Tourist Trophy	Goodwood Circuit	(United Kingdom) Stirling Moss (United Kingdom) Tony Brooks	(United Kingdom) David Brown Ltd.	(United Kingdom) Aston Martin DBR1/300	Results

=== Championship standings ===
Pos	Manufacturer	(Argentina) BUE	(United States) SEB	(Italy) TGA	(West Germany) NÜR	(France) LMS	(United Kingdom) TTR	Total
1	(Italy) Ferrari	8	8	8	(6)	8		32 (38)
2	(Germany) Porsche	4	4	6	(1)	4	(1)	18 (20)
3	(United Kingdom) Aston Martin				8	6	4	18
4	(United Kingdom) Lotus		3					3
5	(Italy) O.S.C.A.			2				2

Note:
- Championship points were awarded for the first six places in each race in the order of 8-6-4-3-2-1, excepting the RAC Tourist Trophy, for which points were awarded 4-3-2-1 for the first four positions.
- Manufacturers were awarded points only for their highest finishing car with no points awarded for positions filled by additional cars.
- Only the best four results from the six races could be retained by each manufacturer. Points earned but not retained are listed within brackets in the above table. Gross points earned are shown in the Total column within brackets.

== The cars ==
The following models contributed to the net championship point scores of their respective manufacturers.

- Ferrari 250 TR 58
- Porsche 718 RSK & Porsche 550A RS
- Aston Martin DBR1/300 & Aston Martin DB3S
- Lotus Eleven
- Osca S1500
