= 1958 1000 km Buenos Aires =

Sports car race

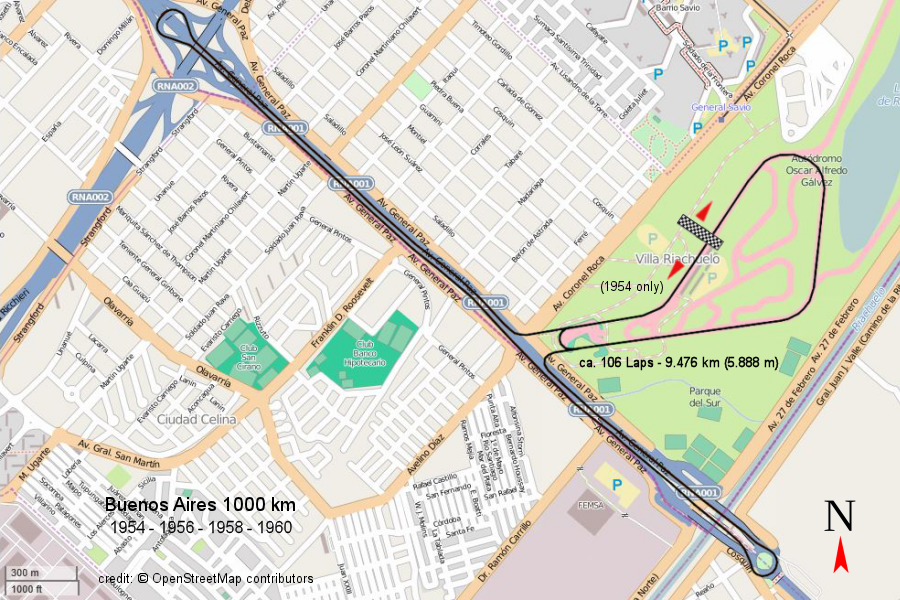
Autódromo Municipal-Avenida Paz - Buenos Aires 1000km

The 1958 1000 km Buenos Aires took place on 26 January, on the Autódromo Municipal-Avenida Paz, (Buenos Aires, Argentina). It was the fifth running of the race, and once again, it was opening round of the F.I.A. World Sports Car Championship. For this event, it returned to the Autódromo, after having a one-off race at the Circuito de la Costanera Norte, however its layout was not generally well received.

The sport’s governing body, F.I.A. and its Commission Sportive Internationale (CSI) dictated several technical changes to the 1958 Sports Car rule book, under teams completing now see their cars’ engines limited to three litres.

== Report ==
=== Entry ===
A grand total of 30 racing cars were registered for this event, of which all 30 arrived for practice and 26 for qualifying for the race. Although this was the first major sports car race of the year to be run since CSI’s rule changes, but as in previous years, the race was poorly supported by the works teams. Only Ferrari sent works cars from Europe. They had entered three of the stunning Ferrari 250 TRs for Peter Collins/Phil Hill, Wolfgang von Trips/Mike Hawthorn and Luigi Musso/Olivier Gendebien.

As for the other works teams from 1957, Aston Martin opted not to do the long trek to South America, while the Jaguar D-Types were no longer eligible to under these new rules, due to their 5-litre engines. As for Maserati, it was announced that due to financial difficulties, they would not continue to operate as a works team.

=== Qualifying ===
After a three-hour qualifying session held on the days prior to the race, it was Collins who took pole position for Scuderia Ferrari in their 250 TR.

However, Stirling Moss and Jean Behra were originally entered to share a Maserati 300S, but when this car broke its crankshaft during a practice session, they were offered a Porsche 550 RS.

=== Race ===
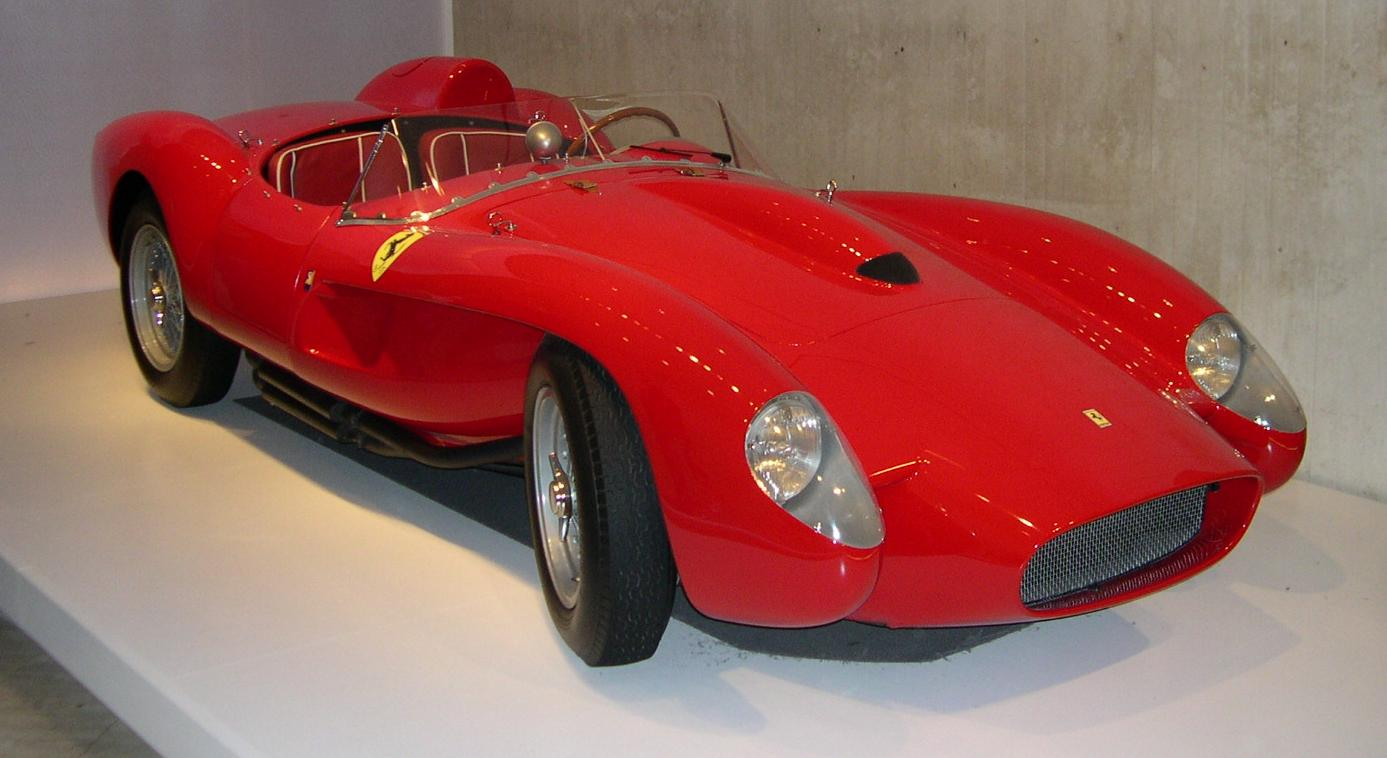
Ferrari 250 TR – similar to the car driven to victory by Collins/Hill.

The race was held over 106 laps of the 5.888 mile, Autódromo Municipal-Avenida Paz, giving a distance of 624.162 miles (1,004.49 km). Due to the lack of opposition, it was left to Ferrari to battle amongst themselves. However, the last minute change of mount for Moss and Behra would bring some excitement to the race, added in part by what was literal invasion of Lepidopterous on race day. Butterflies tended to cover up the cars’water radiators, a problem which air-cooled cars like the Porsche did not have...

In the race, the Scuderia Ferrari of Collins and Hill, won ahead of their teammates von Trips/Gendebien/Musso. Car number 2, took an impressive victory, winning in a time of 6hrs 19:55.4 mins, averaging a speed of 98.572 mph. Second place went to the second Ferrari, albeit 3:14.4 mins. adrift. The podium was complete by the winner of the 1957 Swedish Grand Prix, Moss and Behra who despite their small engine, were just 9.8 seconds behind.

The race was marred by the death of a driver named Jorge Magnasco, following an accident on lap seven, when the driver overturned his Maserati 300S.

== Official Classification ==
Class Winners are in Bold text.

Pos	No	Class	Driver		Entrant	Chassis	Laps	Reason Out
1st	**2**	**S3.0**	(United Kingdom) **Peter Collins**	(United States) **Phil Hill**	**Scuderia Ferrari**	**Ferrari 250 TR 58**	**6hr 19:55.4, 106**	
2nd	4	S3.0	(West Germany) Wolfgang von Trips (Italy) Luigi Musso	(Belgium) Olivier Gendebien	Scuderia Ferrari	Ferrari 250 TR 58	6hr 23.08.0, 106	
3rd	**48**	**S2.0**	(United Kingdom) **Stirling Moss**	(France) **Jean Behra**	**Huschke von Hanstein**	**Porsche 550 RS**	**6hr 23:17.8, 106**	
4th	26	S3.0	(Italy) Piero Drogo	(Venezuela) Sergio González	Piero Drogo	Ferrari 250 TR	102	
5th	**50**	**S1.5**	(East Germany) **Edgar Barth** (Argentina) **Anton von Döry**	(Argentina) **Roberto Miéres**	**Porsche**	**Porsche 550 RS**	**99**	
6th	34	S2.0	(Italy) Gino Munaron	(Italy) Luciano Mantovani		Ferrari 500 TR	98	
7th	28	S3.0	(Argentina) Luis Milán	(Brazil) Antônio Mendes de Barros		Maserati 300S	98	
8th	10	S3.0	(France) Maurice Trintignant	(France) François Picard		Ferrari 250 GT LWB Scaglietti	97	
9th	44	S1.5	(Argentina) Ricardo Grandio	(Chile) Eduardo Kovacs-Jones		Osca F2/S 1500	95	
10th	52	S1.5	(Guatemala) Jaroslav Juhan	(Guatemala) Hubert Wiesse		Porsche 550 RS	94	
11th	38	S2.0	(Argentina) Julio Guimarey	(Argentina) Carlos Guimarey		Maserati A6G	80	
DNF	42	S1.5	(Argentina) Roberto Bonomi	(Italy) Luigi Piotti		Osca S1500	75	Gearbox
DNF	40	S1.5	(Argentina) Alberto Rodríguez Larreta	(Italy) Maria Teresa de Filippis		Osca TN 1500	71	Electrics
DNF	24	S3.0	(Brazil) Celso Lara-Barberis	(Brazil) Eugênio Martins		Ferrari 750 Monza	57	Engine
DNF	32	S2.0	(Sweden) Jo Bonnier	(United States) Masten Gregory		Maserati 200S I	47	Brakes
DNF	22	S3.0	(Argentina) Alvaro Piano	(Argentina) Franco Bruno		Ferrari 625 TF	42	Accident
DNF	36	S2.0	(Italy) Gerino Gerini	(Italy) Giuseppe Musso		Maserati 200S I	30	Fuel system
DNF	62	S3.0	(Peru) Stuart Monro	(Peru) Eduardo Dibós-Chappius		Mercedes-Benz 300 SL	30	Differential
DNF	12	S3.0	(Argentina) Juan Manuel Fangio	(Spain) Francisco Godia-Sales	Scuderia Centro Sud	Maserati 300S	24	Accident damage
DNF	54	S1.5	(Argentina) Pedro von Döry	(West Germany) Curt Delfosse		Porsche 550	21	Gearbox
DNF	30	S2.0	(Italy) Giorgio Scarlatti	(Italy) Antonio Negri Bevilacqua		Maserati 200S I	15	Accident
DNF	20	S3.0	(Argentina) Patricio Badaracco	(Argentina) Federico Mayol		Aston Martin DB2	15	Accident
DNF	14	S3.0	(Argentina) Jorge Magnasco	(Argentina) Juan Manuel Bordeu	Jorge Magnasco	Maserati 300S	8	Fatal accident (Magnasco)
DNF	8	S3.0	(United States) John von Neumann	(West Germany) Wolfgang Seidel	John von Neumann	Ferrari 250 TR	7	Rear Axle
DNF	46	S1.5	(Argentina) Alejandro de Tomaso	(United States) Isabelle Haskell	Isabelle Haskell	Osca F2/S 1500	5	Axle
DNF	6	S3.0	(Italy) Luigi Musso	(Belgium) Olivier Gendebien	Scuderia Ferrari	Ferrari 250 TR	0	Accident
DNS	56	S1.5	(Argentina) Tomas Mayol	(Argentina) Osvaldo Jose Mantega		Porsche 550		DNS
DNS	16	S3.0	(United Kingdom) Stirling Moss	(France) **Jean Behra**	Scuderia Centro Sud	Maserati 300S		Engine in practice
DNS	58	S1.5	(Argentina) Horacio Durado	(Argentina) Horacio Carlomagno		Simca Huit		DNS
DNS		S3.0	(Argentina) Alberto Gómez		Alberto Gómez	Lancia D23		DNS

- Fastest Lap: Stirling Moss, 3:47.6secs (105.830 mph)

=== Class Winners ===
Class	Winners		
Sports 3000	2	Ferrari 250 TR 58	Collins / Hill
Sports 2000	48	Porsche 550 RS 1.6	Moss / Behra
Sports 1500	50	Porsche 550 RS	Barth / Mières / von Döry

== Standings after the race ==
Pos	Championship	Points
1	(Italy) Ferrari	8
2	(West Germany) Porsche	4

- Note: Only the top five positions are included in this set of standings.
  Championship points were awarded for the first six places in each race in the order of 8-6-4-3-2-1, excepting the RAC Tourist Trophy, for which points were awarded on a 4-3-2-1 for the first four places. Manufacturers were only awarded points for their highest finishing car with no points awarded for positions filled by additional cars. Only the best 4 results out of the 6 races could be retained by each manufacturer. Points earned but not counted towards the championship totals are listed within brackets in the above table.

World Sportscar Championship
Previous race: 1957 Venezuelan Grand Prix	1958 season	Next race: 12 Hours of Sebring
