= Giuseppe Musso =

Giuseppe Domenico Musso (1878-1940?) was an Italian lawyer who operated in Beijing and Shanghai between the late 19th and the early 20th century and a confidant of Benito Mussolini. Musso, then working for the Shanghai Opium Combine, and his secretary Alba Corelli, were held hostage as a part of the Lincheng Outrage. After he escaped unharmed from the incident, Musso stopped practicing law and returned to Italy, where he began writing a book titled La Cina ed i Cinesi that described his life as a lawyer and businessman in China.

Musso was born in 1878 to an Italian Consul in Hong Kong. He lived in China for a total of thirty-five years, taking roles at the Chinese Imperial Court in Beijing and the Mixed Court in Shanghai. He was briefly the Chief Attorney of the Shanghai French Concession where he worked with the Green Gang to crack down on banditry. In addition to his work as a lawyer, Musso was a railroad investor and collected photographs.

== Selected works ==
- L'arbitrato come procedura pacifica e la sua natura giuridica nella Società delle Nazioni, 1934
- La Cina ed i Cinesi. Loro Leggi e Costumi, 1926
