= Alfa Romeo Giulietta =

Alfa Romeo Giulietta is the name of three different automobiles made by Italian car manufacturer Alfa Romeo:

- The first Giulietta (Type 750 and 101) is a rear-wheel drive car made from 1954 through 1965, in four-door saloon/sedan, coupé, spider, and estate forms. The Alfa Romeo Giulia replaced it.
- In turn, the Giulia was replaced by the second Giulietta (Type 116), a rear-wheel drive four-door saloon/sedan related to the Alfa Romeo Alfetta and made from 1977 through 1985.
- The third generation Giulietta (Type 940) is a front-wheel drive family hatchback produced from 2010 until 2020.
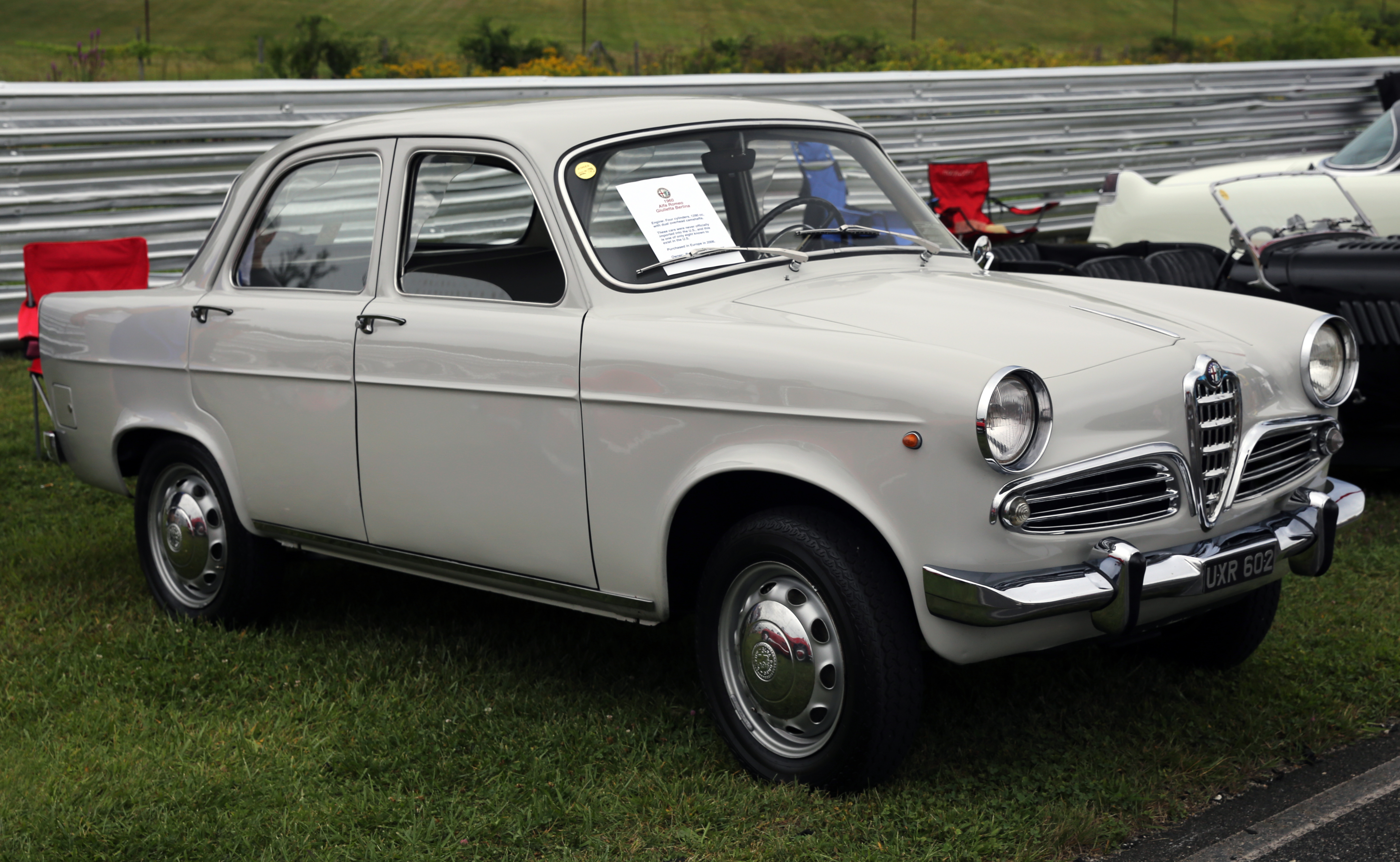
1954–1965 Giulietta (Tipo 750/101)

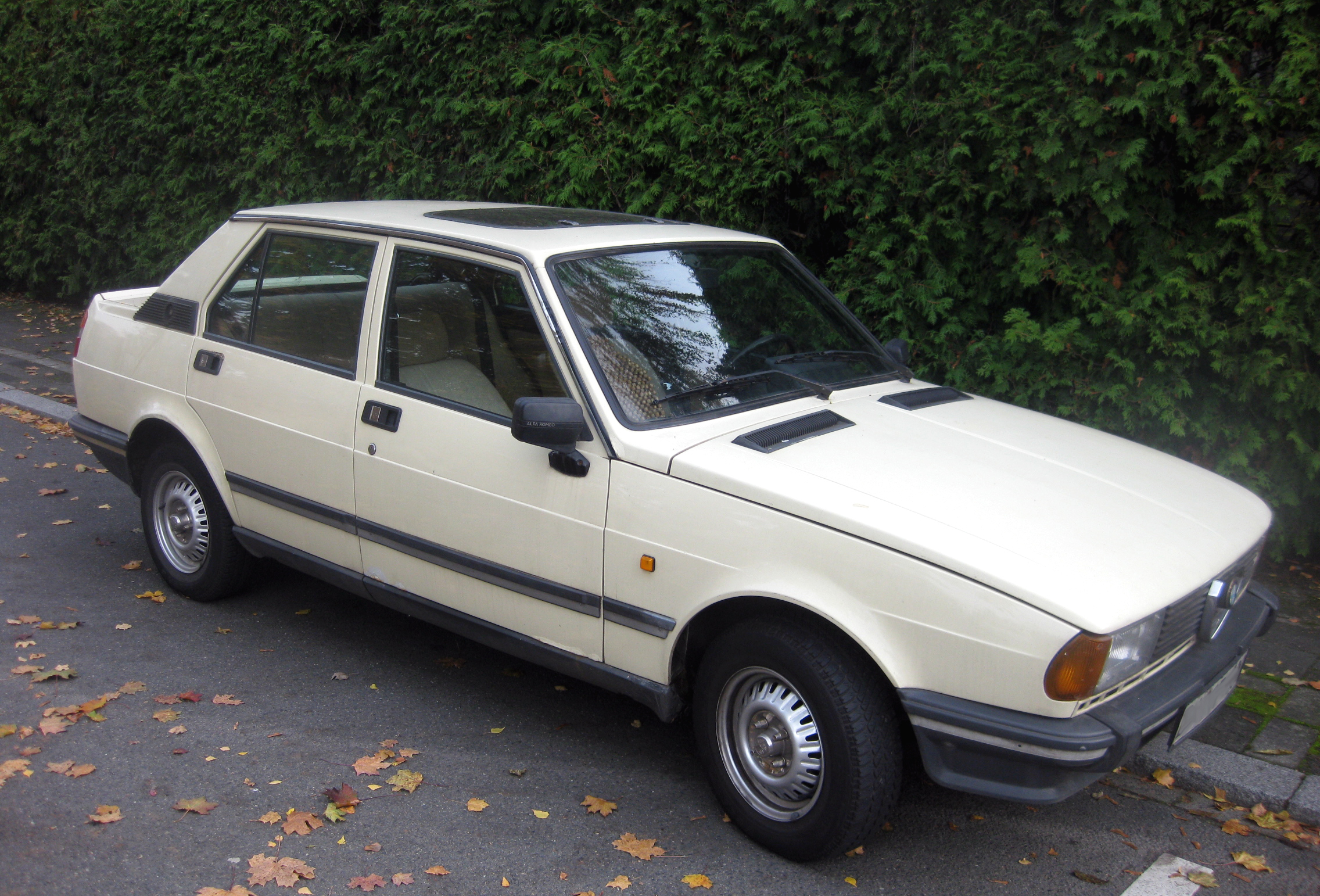
1977–1985 Giulietta (Tipo 116)

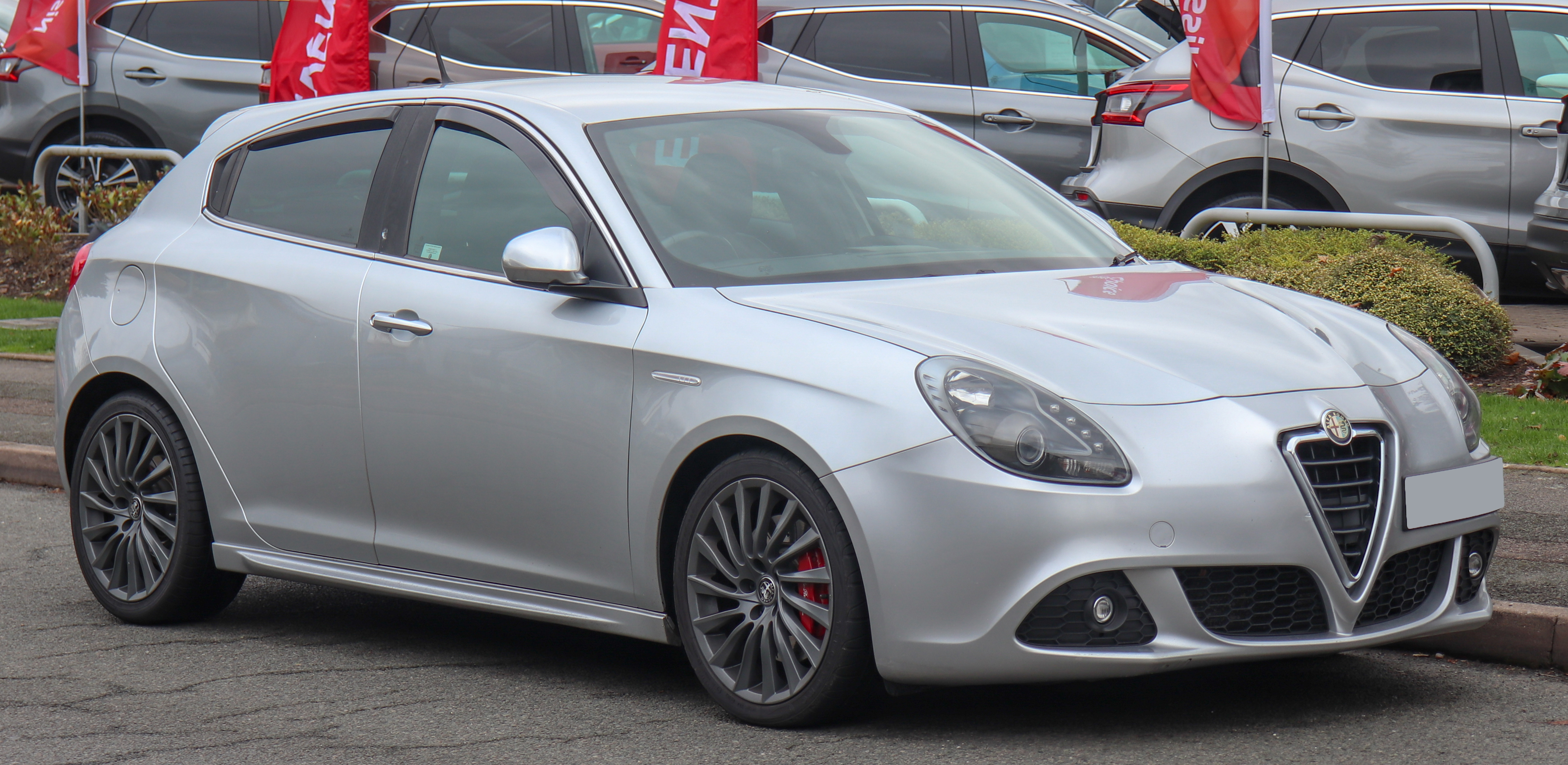
2010–2020 Giulietta (Tipo 940)
