= David Brown (entrepreneur) =

English entrepreneur (1904–1993)

Sir David Brown
- Sir David Brown
- Born: 10 May 1904; Huddersfield, Yorkshire, England
- Died: 3 September 1993 (aged 89); Monte Carlo, Monaco
- Occupations: Industrialist, entrepreneur
- Known for: David Brown Ltd. Aston Martin; Vosper Thorneycroft

Sir David Brown (10 May 1904 – 3 September 1993) was an English industrialist, managing director of his grandfather's gear and machine tool business David Brown Limited and more recently David Brown Tractors, and once the owner of shipbuilders Vosper Thorneycroft and car manufacturers Aston Martin and Lagonda.

== Early life ==
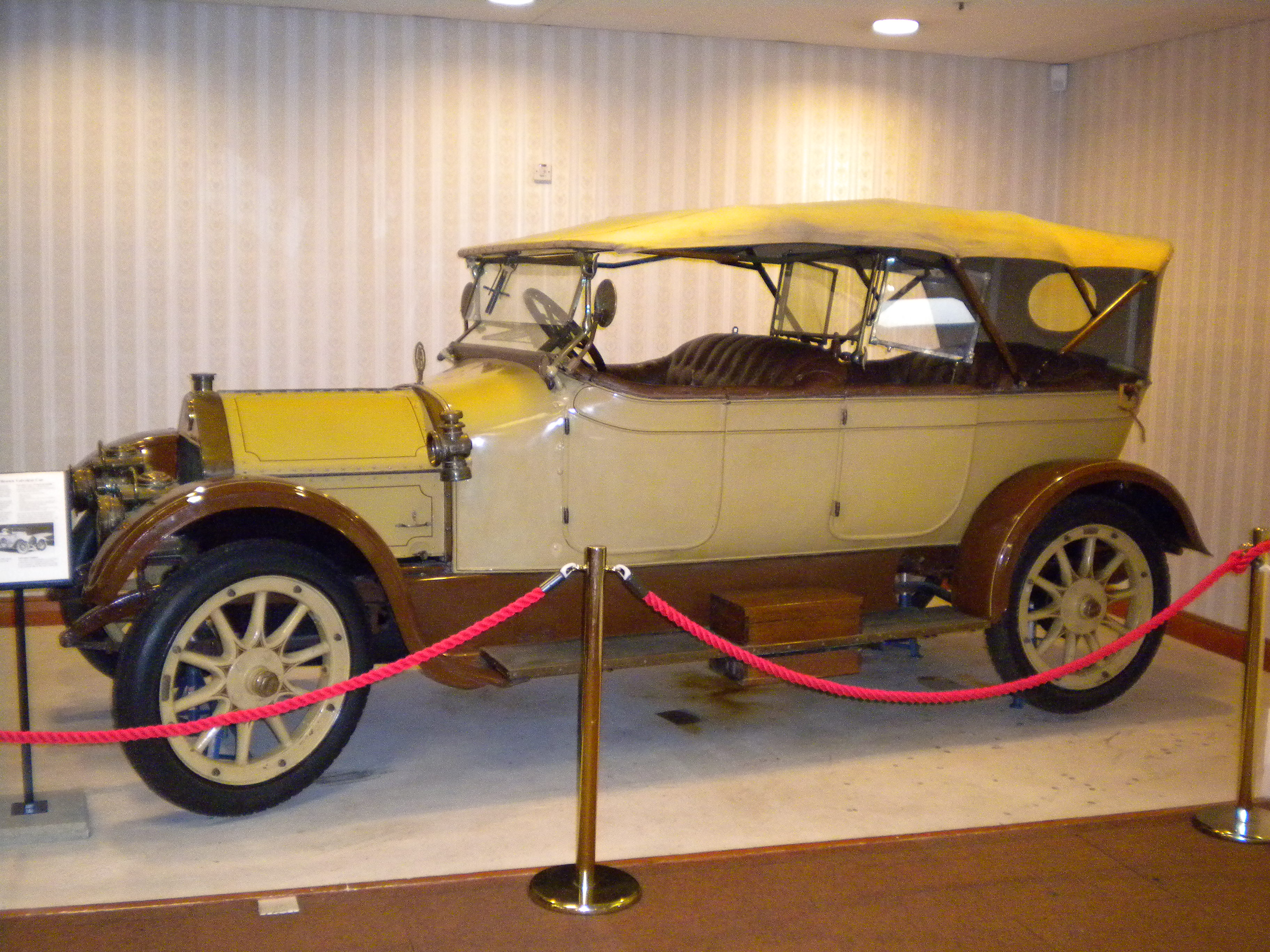
1914 DBS (David Brown & Sons) Valveless phaeton at Tolson Museum

Brown was born in Park Cottage in Huddersfield, Yorkshire, to Caroline and Frank Brown in 1904. Park Cottage was demolished in the Second World War to make way for a new factory, on their 17-acre Park Works site.

Brown attended King James's School in Almondbury and Rossall School in Lancashire.

== David Brown & Sons ==
After leaving school, Brown started work aged 17 in 1921 as if just another apprentice in his family's business, David Brown & Sons (Huddersfield), cycling 6 miles to work by 7.30 a.m.. This company, which had been founded by his grandfather David, specialised in transmission components. While his father had no interest in cars and did not drive, his mother was a keen driver and as a small child he had ridden beside Frederick Tasker Burgess on test runs of David Brown & Sons new Valveless car but he did not learn to drive until aged 11.

Brown's father offered to buy him a motorcycle to help him get to work on time, so relying on his father's ignorance of motor vehicles, instead of a small docile motorcycle, Brown after considering a Harley Davidson obtained a powerful Reading Standard 1,000 cc V-twin. He subsequently improved its performance by modifying the engine and raced it in weekend hill climb competitions at Axe Edge Moor and at Sutton Bank. After achieving the fastest time of the day at Axe Edge Moor he was invited to be a reserve rider for the official Douglas motorcycle team to complete at the next Isle of Man TT. While he attended the practice session, his father forbade him from competing in the competition.

By this time Brown was romantically involved with Daisy Muriel Firth, three years his senior. In an attempt to break up the relationship, his father sent Brown to the Union of South Africa in 1922 to assist a director of the company in overseeing the installation of the company's gears in gold mines near Johannesburg. When the director's drinking affected his ability to do the work, Brown took over responsibility for the project.

Upon his return from South Africa, Brown decided to design and build his own car. Working in his bedroom each night until 2:00 am, he designed a 1.5-litre twin-cam, straight-eight engine. Then using the firm's foundry, he made patterns and cast the cylinder block, while using the machine shop to produce the other components. His father put a stop to the work when he caught his son working on the project in company time. Undaunted, Brown constructed a chassis, fitting it with a Sage 2-litre engine, coupled to a Meadows gear box. He called the result the “Daybro”. David Brown & Sons' gear-grinding skills brought him early contacts with A C Bertelli of Aston Martin for gears and Amherst Villiers for his superchargers. With the consent of Villiers, Brown modified a Vauxhall which then won its class at Shelsley Walsh for three consecutive years. It was said to be capable of more than 140 mph on the sand.

As his grounding continued in various parts of their works he progressed to foreman and then assistant works manager.

Sent to the United States, Africa and Europe in 1928 to study business methods and factory conditions, he returned and started a bronze and steel foundry in Penistone, where unemployment was severe. The new foundry used a new technique of steel casting and was a rapid success. As well as meeting his group's own needs the foundry made precision castings for a range of industries and uses including aircraft airframes, aero engines, electricity power stations, oilfields and oil refineries.

In 1929 he was made a director of David Brown & Sons, and after his uncle Percy's death in 1931 was appointed joint managing director the following year. In 1933 he became managing director. Under Brown's leadership, the company significantly expanded its operations.

== Tractors ==
In 1939, David Brown & Sons acquired the former United Thread Mills factory at Meltham, on the south side of Huddersfield. Brown, who also owned a farm, started the Ferguson-Brown Company in 1936, building tractors with Harry Ferguson in a corner of Park Gear Works; however, they disagreed over design details, which led David Brown to design his own version, the David Brown VAK1, which was introduced to the market in 1939, with over 7,700 units eventually sold. Harry Ferguson went to America and did a deal with Henry Ford to incorporate his system in the Ford N-Series tractor, before setting up Ferguson Tractors.

The Second World War saw a massive increase in the production of gears and gearboxes by David Brown Ltd for use in military equipment. The rising income from the company's traditional products and the manufacture of tractors made Brown a wealthy man.

== Aston Martin ==
In late 1946, Brown saw a classified advertisement in The Times offering for sale a "High Class Motor Business". The asking price was £30,000. On inquiring further Brown discovered that the company was Aston Martin. A few days later Brown visited the company's headquarters at Feltham and test drove their new prototype design, the Atom.

While he felt it had good road handling he considered that its 2.0 litre four cylinder pushrod engine lacked power. However, seeing its potential, he entered into negotiations which ended in February 1947 with his acquiring the company for £20,500. Following the purchase, work began on converting the Atom into a production car. While the prototype was a saloon, Brown preferred convertibles so the chassis was redesigned to accommodate an open top. The modified car provided a basis for the production Aston Martin 2-Litre Sports.

== Lagonda ==
In 1947, Brown heard through Tony Scratchard, the distributor of Lagonda cars in Bradford, that the maker was in financial trouble and up for sale. While he initially took no interest in the company, Brown sensed an opportunity when a liquidator was appointed to sell off the company's assets. When visiting the company he met with the famed engine designer W. O. Bentley, who showed him a modern twin-cam 2,580 cc 6-cylinder, the LB6, which he had been working on for Lagonda. Brown saw it as ideal for his new generation of Aston Martin models. Aware that Armstrong Siddeley, Jaguar and Rootes were also interested in the company and the liquidator was seeking offers of £250,000, Brown still decided to submit one, though he knew it would be the lowest. Because of the tight economic conditions and the rationing of steel, the other bidders dropped out. The liquidator was able to sell the factory buildings to another buyer, but to Brown's surprise was awarded of the rest of the company, including the rights to the new engine, for only £52,500

As Lagonda had to vacate its premises, Brown stored his new assets in some rented hangars at the London Air Park in Hanworth, which was close to the Aston Martin factory. The newly acquired engine soon saw service in the Aston Martin DB2.

In late 1955, Brown acquired the coachbuilder Tickford. He subsequently concentrated all the Aston Martin and Lagonda manufacturing at the Tickford premises in Newport Pagnell.

The legendary 'DB' series of Aston Martin cars, from the DB1 (2 Litre Sports) of 1948 through the DBS of 1967-1972, and numerous DB series since (starting with the DB7 in 1994) all bear Brown's initials. Even as company head he nonetheless used a rival Jaguar XJ Series I as personal transport, as it was cheaper to run.

In February 1972, with the David Brown Corporation in financial difficulties, the other members of the board forced Brown to sell the tractor division to Tenneco International. and Aston Martin Lagonda to a separate buyer. The new owner of Aston Martin Lagonda dropped the DB model designation, which in 1993 was restored during Ford ownership with the introduction of the DB7. Walter Hayes, chairman of Aston Martin Lagonda, invited Brown to become the Honorary Life President of Aston Martin Lagonda, a position which Brown accepted.

=== Vosper Thornycroft ===
In 1963, the David Brown Corporation purchased a controlling interest in the British shipbuilder Vosper & Company, at which Sir David Brown became chairman. The company merged with British shipbuilder John I. Thornycroft & Company to create Vosper Thornycroft in 1966. The warship building division of the company was nationalised by the Labour Government in 1977, becoming a division of British Shipbuilders. The rest of the company remained publicly quoted as a subsidiary of the David Brown Corporation. Bitter about the nationalisation, Brown left Britain to live in retirement in Monte Carlo.

=== Company sale ===
In January 1990, Brown sold his shares in the David Brown Corporation for £46 million, but retained a link with the company in his role as its honorary president.

== Personal life ==
In 1926, against the wishes of his parents, who refused to attend the wedding, Brown married Daisy Muriel Firth, whom he had known since he was 14. They had two children, David and Angela, both of whom entered the family business. Angela married George Abecassis, the racing driver. Following his divorce from Daisy, Brown married his secretary, Marjorie Deans, in 1955. This marriage also ended in divorce. He subsequently married his personal assistant, Paula Benton Stone, in 1980.

Brown played polo at Ham Polo Club in the summer and during the winter he spent most weekends hunting; he was joint Master of the South Oxford hounds. He also bred hunters and racehorses on his 700 acres (280 hectares) farm in Buckinghamshire. His greatest success was his horse Linwell winning the 1957 Cheltenham Gold Cup. Brown was a qualified pilot, had his own De Havilland Dove, which was normally flown by his personal pilot, and he also established his own airfield at Crosland Moor.

He was a member of the board of governors of the Huddersfield Royal Infirmary, the council of Huddersfield Chamber of Commerce and Lloyd's.

He was knighted in 1968 for services to industry.

== Death ==
Brown died in September 1993 in Monte Carlo. Eight years later, David Brown Limited was acquired by Textron.
