= Permian Basin Petroleum Museum =

Museum in Midland, Texas, USA

Coordinates: 31.9724°N 102.0853°W

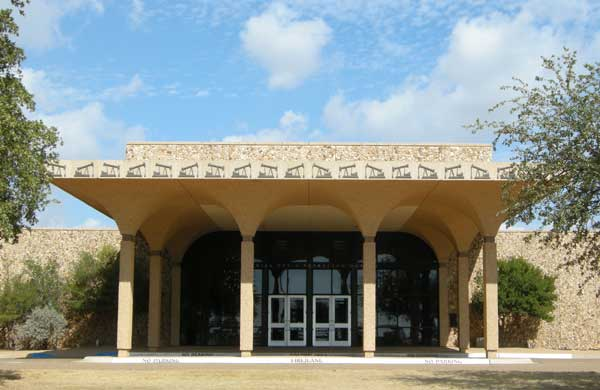
- Entrance view of the Permian Basin Petroleum Museum in 2009
- Interactive map of the Permian Basin Petroleum Museum area

General information
- Type: Petroleum Museum
- Location: Midland, Texas, U.S., 1500 I-20, Midland, TX 79701

Technical details
- Size: 60,000 square feet (5,600 m^{2})

Website
- https://petroleummuseum.org/

The Permian Basin Petroleum Museum is a museum in Midland, Texas, USA, with exhibits relating to the oil and gas industry of the Permian Basin of west Texas and southeast New Mexico. Museum exhibits include the geology of the area during the Permian period, the technology of the petroleum industry, racing cars designed by Jim Hall, and paintings by artist Tom Lovell.

The museum was founded in 1968 by a group of 500 under the leadership of George T. Abell under the Abell-Hangar Foundation, and officially opened its doors to the public in 1975. The museum occupies a 60,000-square-foot (5,600 m^{2}) building, with 40,000 square feet (3,700 m^{2}) dedicated to exhibits and an outdoor exhibit space for large oil-field machinery. It is open to the public seven days per week.

The museum maintains a research library containing donated material related to the history of the Permian Basin oil industry. It contains one of the largest collections of archived petroleum-related artifacts in its archives center. It also houses the Petroleum Hall of Fame which includes over 140 men and women who have impacted the Permian Basin's petroleum industry.

== Facilities ==
The original museum was established between 1968 and 1975. In 2004, the facility received a $7.2 million expansion to its Transportation Wing. In 2013, the museum received $18 million to renovate its petroleum exhibits which were completed in 2016.

== Exhibits ==
=== Geology & Geography ===
The first exhibit of the museum focuses on a history the microbial inhabitants and environment of the Permian Basin 265 million years ago. This includes a fossil collection, Permian Sea microscopic viewers, a diorama of the ancient reefs of the sea, and a timelapse of the evolving geography of the region. The second exhibit focuses on the geology of the region. At the center of this exhibit is a pillar sample of the rock up to 14,000 feet (4,300 m) below the surface of the basin. Surrounding the interactive layered rock pillar are other depictions of the layers of the Permian Basin, including a large cross-section diorama. Further into the museum, a second geology section displays drill core samples of rock in the area, a seismic survey exhibit and other geology related education.

=== Petroleum History ===
The third exhibit, called "The birth of an industry," is a re-creation of a 20s town center, featuring a company storefront, a fuel pump, land & title office front, and displayed artifacts. This exhibit style continues into the "growth of an industry" exhibit depicting various oil and gas companies through the decades and includes artifacts related to them. Artifacts like a Gulf sign, Texaco pump, and a Specialty Shooting Co. Nitro truck are prominent in this exhibit. The next exhibit outlines the creation of Organization of Petroleum Exporting Countries (OPEC) in the 1960s and its affect on the global petroleum market. The following exhibit discusses the changing landscape of oil as new reserves and drilling techniques are discovered, changing forecasts on the limited oil supply. This area is concluded with the PetroTrekker interactive exhibit.

==== Drilling ====
A small exhibit continues out of the seismic geology section, outlining the process of drilling for oil. Artifacts like real drill bits, a model oil drill, well analysis data and real life examples of the application of these artifacts scatter the exhibit.

==== What's in a Barrel ====
This exhibit outlines all of the products derived from a barrel of crude oil. Surrounding a video presentation are dozens of artifacts reflecting those products.

==== Supplemental Energy ====
This exhibit discusses other forms of energy that do not use petroleum based products to produce energy. Listed topics are geothermal, solar, hydro, wind, nuclear, coal and various emerging technologies like fuel cells and biomass-fueled energy.

=== Outdoor Oil Patch ===
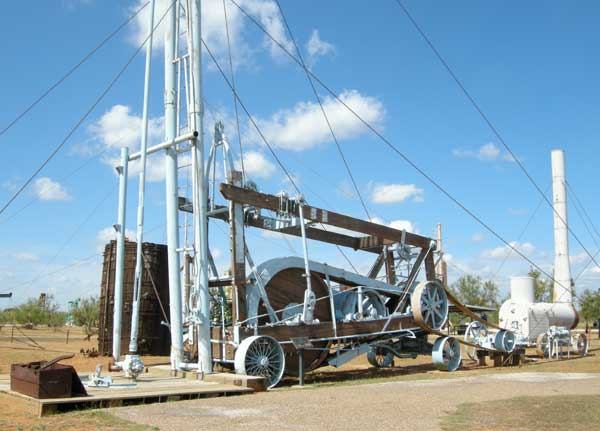
Early mobile drilling rig in museum collection

The only outdoor exhibit, the Oil Patch, is dedicated to the men of the oil fields that dug ditches, drilled wells and produced the crude oil that the museum celebrates. At over 40 acres, it is one of the largest collections of its type in the world. The exhibit includes:

- Eight full-sized cable-tool rigs
- Santa Rita Number 2: an oil drilling rig that was converted into a pump
- 148 feet (45 m) mast rotary drilling rig
- 119 feet (36 m) steel production derrick (1930s)
- Various oil field tools

== Galleries ==
=== Mineral Gallery ===
This gallery contains rare gemstones and geodes.

=== Abell Family Gallery ===
This gallery contains both Abell family history and artifacts, as well as Tim Lovell's exhibit of paintings of fourteen Permian Basin historical scenes.

=== Chaparral Cars Gallery ===
This Chaparral Gallery Exhibit contains seven race cars built by Jim Hall and Hap Sharp of Chaparral Cars, as well as a prototype Corvette tested by Jim Hall for Chevrolet Engineering. In 1962, Chaparral Cars was founded by the pair of American F1 drivers in Midland, Texas. Out of their small, Texas shop, the two pioneered the use of aerodynamics in motorsports with their movable wing and active and passive ground-effect designs. This includes the Chaparral 2J, an ultra high downforce fan car built for the 1970 Can-Am series that was banned by FIA officials following its success. The museum drives one of these racing cars in front of the museum about every other month to maintain their running and driving conditions. Below is a list of the displayed race cars:

Photo	Name	Operation	Ref(s)
	Chaparral 2	1963 1964 1965	
	Chaparral 2D	1966	
	Chaparral 2E		
	Chaparral 2F	1967	
	Chaparral 2H	1969 Can-Am	
	Chaparral 2J	1970 Can-Am	
	Chaparral 2K	1979 Indy Car 1980 Indy Car	
	GS IIB Experimental Corvette	1963 1964	

=== Petroleum Hall of Fame ===
A highlight of the Permian Basin Petroleum Museum is its Petroleum Hall of Fame, originally instituted in 1967. This hall boasts the image of 156 of its distinguished honorees. Every odd-numbered year saw the induction of four new people or teams to the hall.

== See also ==
- List of museums in West Texas
- List of petroleum museums
