= 1966 Canadian Grand Prix =

1966 Canadian Formula One race held in Bowmanville, Ontario

- Race 3 of 6 in 1966 Can-Am season

Race details
- Date: September 24, 1966
- Location: Mosport Park, Bowmanville, Ontario, Canada
- Course: Permanent racing facility
- Course length: 3.95 km ( miles)
- Distance: 88 laps, 336 km ( miles)
- Weather: Cold with temperatures approaching 13.9 °C (57.0 °F); wind speeds up to 18.1 kilometres per hour (11.2 mph)

Pole position
Driver	(United States) Dan Gurney	Lola-Ford
- Time: 1:50.7

Fastest lap
Driver	(United States) Dan Gurney	Lola-Ford
- Time: 1:23.1

Podium
First	(United States) Mark Donohue	Lola-Chevrolet
Second	(United States) Phil Hill	Chaparral-Chevrolet
Third	(United States) Chuck Parsons	McLaren-Chevrolet

The 1966 Canadian Grand Prix was a motor race held at Mosport Park on September 24, 1966, held for sports cars eligible to Can-Am Series regulations and had 30 starters. It was the sixth Canadian Grand Prix and like all previous races was a sports car race. The race doubled as round three of the 1966 Can-Am Series. The race was won by Penske driver Mark Donohue by two laps over Chaparral driver Phil Hill.

== Classification ==
Results as follows:

Pos	No.	Driver	Team	Car	Laps	Time	Points
1	6	(United States) Mark Donohue	Roger Penske Racing Enterprises	Lola T70 / Chevrolet	85	2h 03m 09.2s	9
2	65	(United States) Phil Hill	Chaparral Cars	Chaparral 2E / Chevrolet	83		6
3	10	(United States) Chuck Parsons	Hilton Racing Team	McLaren M1B / Chevrolet	82		4
4	99	(United States) Earl Jones	Charles Hayes Racing	McLaren M1B / Chevrolet	80		3
5	11	(Australia) Paul Hawkins	Epstein Enterprises Ltd.	Lola T70 Mk.II / Chevrolet	79		2
6	94	(Canada) Eppie Wietzes	Comstock Racing Team	Ford GT40	78		1
7	53	(United Kingdom) Hugh Dibley	Racing Partners	Lola T70 Mk.II / Chevrolet	77		
8	00	(United States) Bobby Brown		Lola T70 Mk.II / Chevrolet	74		
9	52	(United States) Bill Eve	Eve & Jones Racing	Genie Mk.10 / Ford	70		
10	88	(United States) Masten Gregory	Pacesetter Homes	McLaren M1B / Chevrolet	68		
11	86	(United States) Mike Goth	Mike Goth Racing	McLaren Goth Special / Chevrolet	65		
DNF	30	(United States) Dan Gurney	All American Racers	Lola T70 / Ford	75	Ignition	
DNF	5	(New Zealand) Chris Amon	Bruce McLaren Motor Racing Ltd.	McLaren M1B / Chevrolet	66	Suspension	
DNF	61	(United States) Bud Morley		McLaren M1B / Ford	63	Engine	
DNF	38	(United States) Dick Brown	Ecurie Green Inc.	McLaren M1B / Ford	60		
DNF	81	(New Zealand) Denny Hulme	Sidney Taylor Racing	Lola T70 / Chevrolet	56	Transmission	
DNF	39	(Canada) Ludwig Heimrath		McLaren M1B / Ford	54	Suspension	
DNF	4	(New Zealand) Bruce McLaren	Bruce McLaren Motor Racing Ltd.	McLaren M1B / Chevrolet	41	Suspension	
DNF	77	(United States) Mak Kronn	John W. Fritsch	McKee Mk.6 / Chevrolet	40		
DNF	33	(United States) Sam Posey	Autodynamics Corporation	McLaren M1B / Ford	28		
DNF	66	(United States) Jim Hall	Chaparral Cars	Chaparral 2E / Chevrolet	13	Engine	
DNF	29	(United States) Bob Bucher	Young B.A.R.F. Inc. Racing Team	Lola T70 / Ford	10	Transmission	
DNF	97	(United States) Charlie Hayes	Nickey Chevrolet	McLaren M1B / Chevrolet	10	Accident	
DNF	60	(United States) Ed Hamill	Hamill Cars Inc.	Hamill SR3 / Chevrolet	8		
DNF	62	(Canada) John Cannon	Ecurie Carabine	McLaren M1B / Chevrolet	5	Fuel leak	
DNF	57	(United States) John Cordts	David Billes	McLaren M1A / Chevrolet	3		
DNF	96	(United States) Lothar Motschenbacher	Dan Blocker Motor Racing	Genie Vinegaroon / Oldsmobile	1	Accident	
DNF	7	(United Kingdom) John Surtees	Team Surtees	Lola T70 Mk.II / Chevrolet	1	Accident	
DNF	19	(United States) Skip Scott	Drummond Racing Organisation	McLaren M1B / Ford	1	Accident	
DNF	23	(United States) Brett Lunger	Alderman Auto Service	Lola T70 / Ford	1	Accident	
DNS	16	(United States) George Follmer	John W. Mecom, Jr.	Lola T70 / Ford			
DNS	8	(United States) Jerry Grant	All American Racers	Lola T70 / Ford		Accident	

Preceded by 1965 Canadian Grand Prix	Canadian Grand Prix; 1966	Succeeded by 1967 Canadian Grand Prix
