= Chaparral 2F =

Group 6 racing car by Chaparral

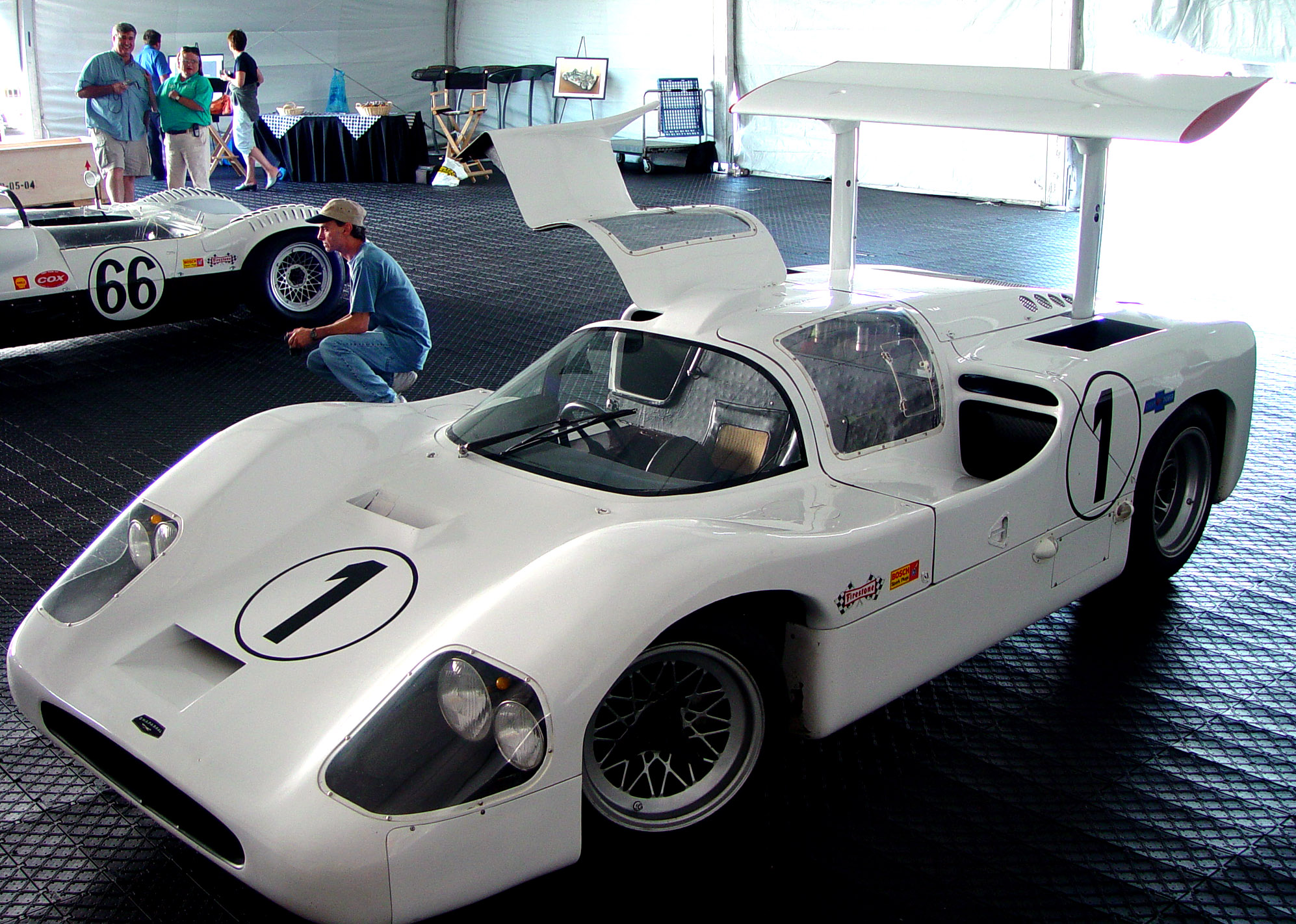
- The 2F at the 2005 Monterey Motorsports Reunion
- Category: Group 6
- Constructor: Chaparral Cars
- Designers: Jim Hall; Hap Sharp
- Predecessor: Chaparral 2D

Technical specifications
- Chassis: Moulded fiberglass monocoque
- Suspension (front): Double wishbones with co-axial coil spring dampers
- Suspension (rear): Twin-radius rods, with reverse lower wishbones and anti-roll bar
- Engine: Chevrolet "Porcupine" 427 cu in (6,997 cc) V8 naturally aspirated mid-engined, longitudinally mounted
- Transmission: Chevrolet 3-speed automatic
- Power: 392 kW (533 PS; 526 hp) @ 6,000 rpm
- Brakes: Solid discs
- Tires: Firestone; Chaparral cast-alloy one-piece center-locking 16 in wheels

Competition history
- Notable entrants: Chaparral Cars
- Notable drivers: (United States) Phil Hill; (United Kingdom) Mike Spence (United States) Jim Hall (United States) Hap Sharp
- Debut: 1967 24 Hours of Daytona
Races	Wins	Poles	F/Laps
8	1	3	4

The Chaparral 2F is a Group 6 prototype designed by Jim Hall and Hap Sharp and built under their company Chaparral Cars. Built with the intention to compete in the World Sportscar Championship, it competed in the 1967 season, with a best finish of first at the BOAC 500, driven by Phil Hill and Mike Spence. The 2F, alongside its Can-Am sibling the 2E, had a heavy influence in dictating the direction of Formula One car design in the late 1960s and early 1970s. With the amounts of mechanical grip the car and tires could provide approaching their respective limits, there was a larger emphasis on aerodynamic efficiency with race car designer Colin Chapman quick to include them on his Formula One cars.

== Background ==
The importance and role of aerodynamics in motorsports was not particularly well understood in the 1960s; privateer Michael Mayer attempted what was the first implementation of an airfoil at the 1956 1000 km of Nürburgring with his Porsche 550. He mounted a wing just above the driving position, later being forced by scrutineers to remove it. Jim Hall of Chaparral Cars, with his degree from the California Institute of Technology in mechanical engineering, saw the potential in using lift-generating airplane wings as a means to generate downforce to increase the performance of his cars. Hall first realized the role of reversing lift-generating structures in the winter of 1963, where his first race car, the Chaparral 2, was experiencing issues with lift at the front of the car. As Hall experimented and changed the bodywork, he discovered that further modifying the bodywork to generate reverse lift, or downforce, could drastically improve lap times. The luxury of having a private racetrack nearby meant Hall's development of his aerodynamics progressed much more rapidly than that of other teams.

In 1965, Jim Hall, alongside colleagues at General Motors (GM), collaborated in experimenting with rear aero structures, which resulted in a small adjustable rear wickerbill being mounted onto the rear of Chaparral's 2C for the 1965 United States Road Racing Championship, where it proved to be highly successful. The 2C's rear wickerbill was adjustable by a third pedal within the driver's cockpit, and with that the 2C became the first racing car in the world to feature active aerodynamics.

The 2C's evolution in the 2 series, the 2E, took the concept even further, with a full-blown rear wing mounted at the rear of the chassis, high above the driving position. Another aerodynamic innovation was the changing of the radiator position from the front of the nose to the sides of the car, freeing up space at the front and allowing the nose to act as a miniature Venturi tunnel in one of the first uses of ground effect in motorsport, giving the car balance between front and rear downforce. The 2E would almost win the inaugural 1966 Can-Am season championship, having been narrowly defeated by John Surtees in a Lola T70. Jim Hall and Hap Sharp were encouraged by the 2E's results, which included a 1–2 finish at Laguna Seca.

With the success of the 2E in the Can-Am championship, Hall decided to implement his rear wing structure into the 2D's successor. The 2D was a closed-roof version of the Chaparral 2, which had been Chaparral's primary race car from 1963 to 1965 in the World Sportscar Championship (WSC). Introduced for the 1966 season of the WSC, the 2D was oft stricken with mechanical issues, with a single win coming at the 1966 1000 km of Nürburgring. The third original 2 chassis was converted into a single 2F, with the other 2D being converted into a 2F later on in the 1967 World Sportscar Championship season.

Hall's connection to Chevrolet began in 1962, at the unveiling of the Chevrolet Corvair Monza GT at Elkhart Lake, Wisconsin. The concept car's semi-monocoque piqued his interest, and thus began his relationship with Frank Winchell, the Monza GT's designer. Winchell was simultaneously running a program in his department at General Motors to develop a mid-engined version of the Chevrolet Corvette, featuring an automatic transaxle. Hall further courted GM when their research and development department requested to use his track, Rattlesnake Raceway, for testing after Ralph Nader published his book Unsafe at Any Speed: The Designed-In Dangers of the American Automobile in 1965, which alleged that the American automobile industry was ignoring safety features when designing cars. The relationship never extended to a full on factory-backed effort, with GM engineer Jim Musser saying "We stayed in the background because we weren't meant to be racing at the time. We never sponsored the Chaparral program with cash. We did provide bits and pieces, and they did lots of our testing, from which we both benefited." Among those "bits and pieces" was the transmission for the 2F, a Chevrolet automatic 3-speed transaxle, replacing the previous Cooper and Colotti manual transmissions they had previously used. Despite Musser's assertions that Chaparral was never officially or unofficially supported by GM, there still remained much speculation within the racing community as to what capacity Hall and Sharp were involved with GM.

== Specifications ==
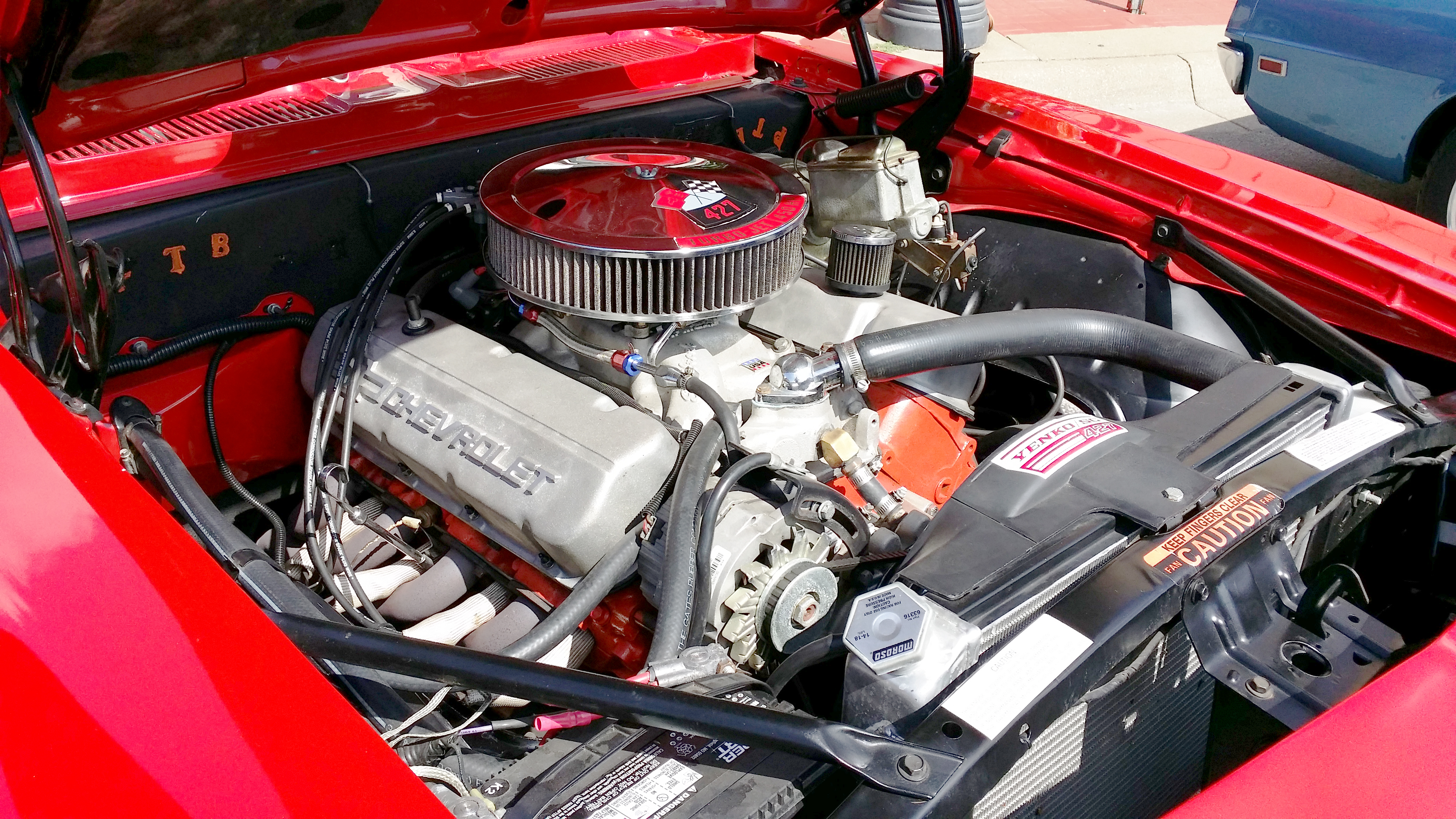
A 1969 Camaro with the 427 Chevrolet big-block, the same big-block that was used in the 2F, instead with Weber 58IDM carburetors.

The 2F did not carry over the 2E's aluminum tube-frame chassis, with Hall and Sharp instead opting to continue with the fiberglass semi-monocoque, and General Motors supplied Chaparral with Chevrolet's "Porcupine" 427 big-block V8 engine, and a 3-speed automatic transaxle. The 427-aluminum block was fitted with Weber 58IDM carburetors that allowed it to produce 392 kW (533 PS; 526 hp) at 6,000 rpm, far more power than the 427s found in production versions. The nose's Venturi-like structure was retained, along with the side-mounted radiators. The large rear wing struts were attached onto the suspension uprights, so that the downforce generated by the wing acted directly on the tires, shifting weight-bias rearwards too. The positioning of the radiators on the side also meant that a roof-mounted intake was no longer needed, with cold air flowing straight to the engine. With the longer endurance races of the World Sportscar Championship in mind, centerlock wheels also replaced the 2D's bolt-on wheels. Initially, only a single chassis was constructed, but a 2D that retired at the 1967 12 Hours of Sebring was later converted into a second 2F chassis. Like its previous iterations, the rear wing was hydraulically actuated by a third pedal within the driver's cockpit, with a high-downforce mode and a low-drag mode. A small luggage compartment was also included in the front of the car, which was required by Group 6 regulations.

== Racing history ==
The 2F debuted at the opening round of the 1967 World Sportscar Championship, the 1967 24 Hours of Daytona. It qualified second with a time of 1:55.36, close behind the pole-sitting Ford GT40 Mk II of Dan Gurney, and in front of numerous Ferraris entered, which included several factory-backed efforts along with several factory-backed Fords. Phil Hill led the early stages of the race, the 2F's downforce and power playing in Chaparral's favor on Daytona's steep banks. Hill later came in to change seats with Mike Spence, who handed the car back to Hill on the 88th lap. Hill's stint did not last long, when he came into turn six he ran over debris of segments of where the track had disintegrated, despite resurfacing attempts prior to the race. The following loss of traction caused Hill to strike the upper barrier on the infield banking twice, damaging several suspension components which were repaired when Hill limped back to the pitlane. The 2F came out for a few more laps, but eventually retired four hours into the race. Hill partially took the blame for the crash, citing his excessive exit speed from turn six, however, mentioned that Spence failed to inform him of the conditions at turn six. Prior to retiring, Hill did manage to capture the fastest lap, almost equalling his qualifying time with a 1:55.69.

At the following round at the Sebring International Raceway, Hill was admitted to hospital after practice with appendicitis, with Jim Hall replacing him. The 2F had several mechanical issues during practice, with Hill twenty-one seconds slower than the Ford GT40 Mk IVs, with Spence barely getting any practice time either. When it came to the race though, the 2F proved to be very quick, lowering the lap record several times throughout the race. The Chaparral exchanged the lead with the Fords several times, as the latter needed to pit more often due to fuel pump issues. Come the eighth hour, Hall came in to hand over the wheel to Spence, however, the transmission was already overheating, and Spence retired after a few laps with differential failure, ending their Sebring campaign.

The team flew over to Europe and based themselves in General Motors' Rüsselsheim am Main factory for the remaining European races. The next event, the 1967 1000 km of Monza, saw Spence qualifying on pole. The 2F had already shown that it was a credible threat to the Ferrari 330 P3s and Ferrari P4s entered, posting the fastest time during practice, a 2:53.8, three-tenths ahead of Lorenzo Bandini's works P4. The 2F took advantage of the rolling start, leading away the field with Bandini and Mike Parkes closely behind. Shortly before the one-hour mark, Spence pitted, feeling significant vibrations at the rear of his car. Initially, it was suspected to be a tire that had been losing air, but after replacing the tire the vibration continued. Spence pitted once more, this time the cause of the vibrations turned out to be a universal joint failure in the drive shaft coupling. Their Monza race ended with another mechanical retirement.

Hill was on pole for the 1967 1000 km of Spa-Francorchamps, and local favorite Jacky Ickx lined up beside him on the front row. Ickx's prowess in wet weather conditions was on full display as rain began and continued to fall on race day, quickly taking the lead at the start, with fellow Belgian Willy Mairesse in his Ferrari 412 P close behind. Spence could not replicate the 2F's pace in the dry, due in part to Hall instructing the drivers not to operate the adjustable wing due to their wet weather inexperience. Paul Hawkins in his Lola T70 Mk III passed him on the fifth lap, and the 2F was fifth by the tenth lap. Ickx and Mairesse both commanded a significant lead over the rest of the field, and Spence pitted on the seventeenth lap for fuel and to swap seats with Hill. Another mechanical failure struck the team, with the engine's battery system failing. The battery system was successfully repaired; Hill rejoined two laps down. Several other cars including the leaders pitted soon thereafter, shaking up the order, although Ickx soon retook the lead. Spence took the reins again shortly before the halfway mark, this time without a hitch. A few laps later Mairesse crashed out in his Ferrari, leaving Ickx's teammate Dick Thompson to run by himself. As the rain lightened, the rear airfoil of the 2F was put to good use, with Spence clocking the fastest lap of the race, a 4:03.5. No sooner had he done this he came into the pits with another transmission failure, ending their race.

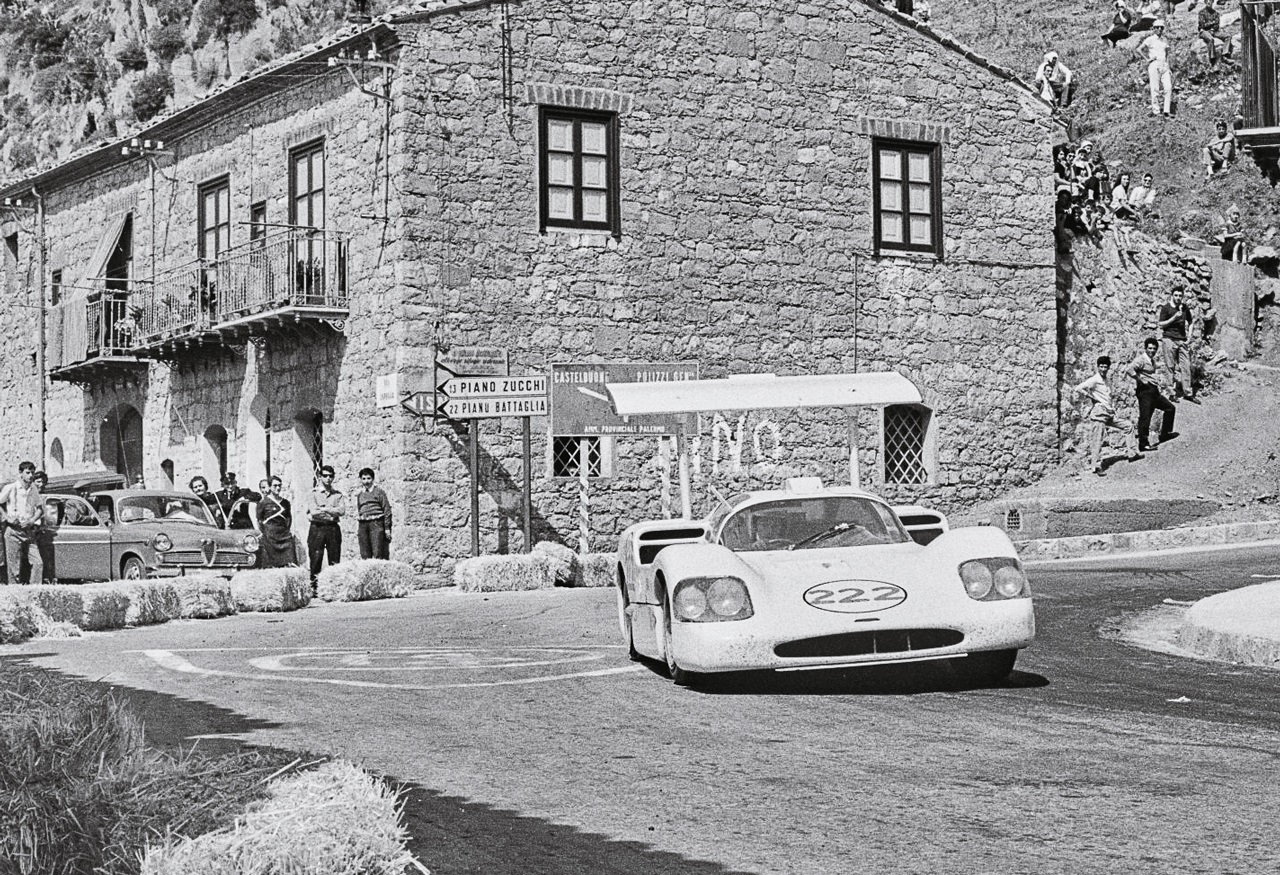
The 2F rounds the Collesano corner at the 1967 Targa Florio, the same corner where they would pick up debris that caused their retirement.

Hap Sharp stood in for Spence for the 51st Targa Florio, where Italian favorite Nino Vaccarella was fastest in practice. In the race, several retirements from the front saw the 2F running fourth despite its unsuitability to a road course but was still almost ten minutes behind the leading Porsche 910. Hill and Sharp were careful not to push the car too hard, with Le Mans approaching they could not afford to damage or destroy a chassis. A slow puncture that began at the Collesano corner on the ninth lap brought their race to a close. Sharp did have a spare tire, but it was for the front tires only, whereas the puncture had occurred at the rear. The 2F, despite not being Italian, was met with a sympathetic crowd upon their retirement.

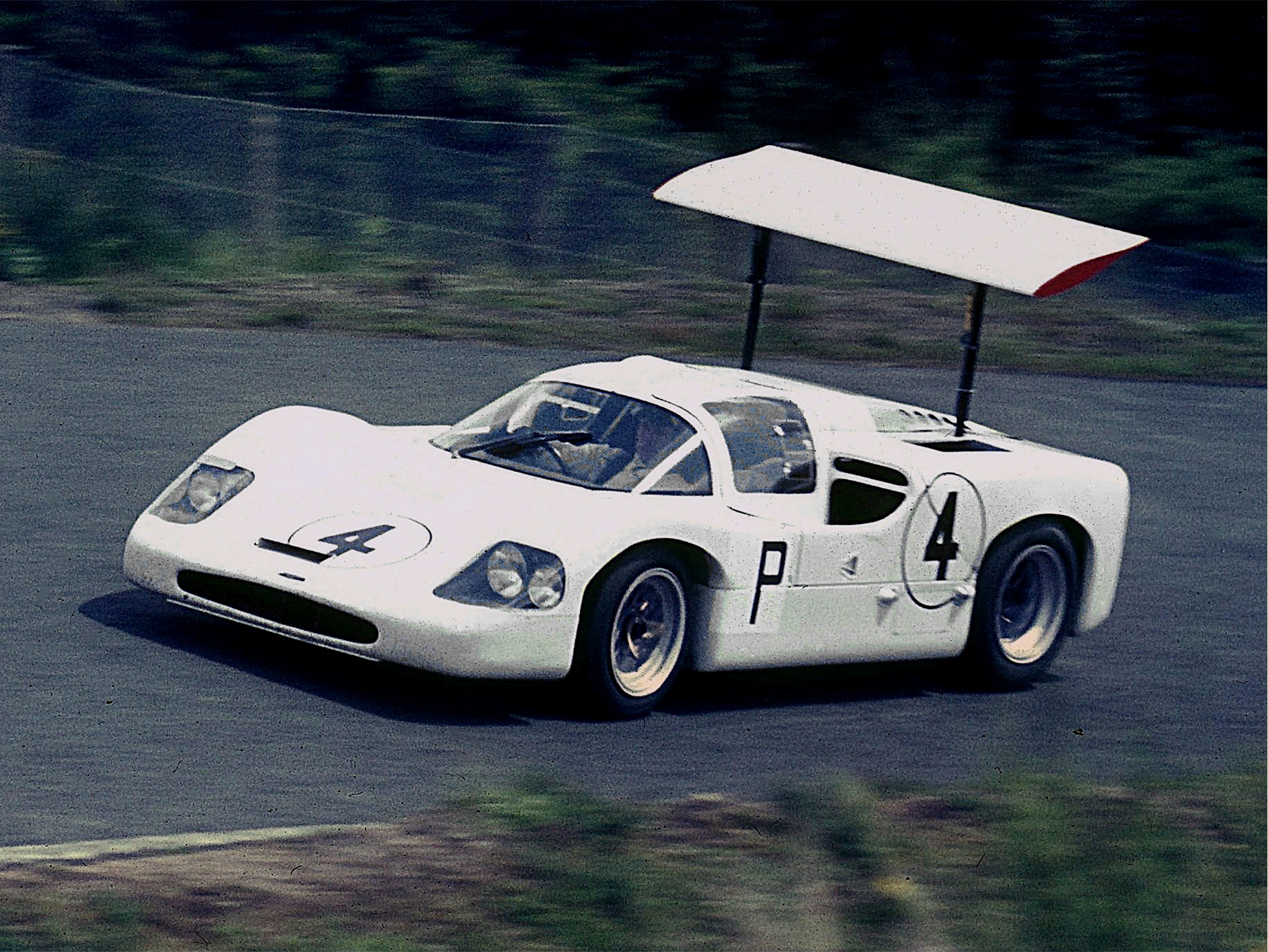
Mike Spence during practice for the 1967 1000 km of Nürburgring.

Hill qualified on pole for the 1967 1000 km of Nürburgring, just over half a minute ahead of Jacky Ickx, slowest in the Group 6 category, and almost ten seconds ahead of John Surtees' Aston Martin-powered Lola T70. A smorgasbord of cars were entered, with dedicated race cars and club racers alike. This made for a hectic start, where the almost-stock sports cars had the better of the purpose-built race cars when it came to the Le Mans-style start, where drivers would run to their car and start their engines before taking off. Hill, Surtees, and Ickx all struggled getting off the start line, with Hill fiddling to get his safety harness on properly, and Surtees and Ickx both having trouble starting their engines. Hill set off on a charge once he finally settled in, passing a significant number of cars on his first lap, working his way up to third by the second lap. Hill also managed to set the lap record on his second lap, despite the significant number of backmarkers, clocking an 8:42.1. By the fourth lap, Surtees and Ickx were seventh and ninth, respectively, with only Jo Siffert in front of Hill. Hill took the lead on the ninth lap, having mistakenly thought that he was leading on the previous laps. Come the eleventh lap, Hill pitted, much to the surprise of his pit crew who were not expecting him. Once again, transmission troubles struck the 2F, giving the team their fifth retirement of the season.

Both 2F chassis were fielded for the 1967 24 Hours of Le Mans, with the No. 7 piloted by Hill and Spence, and the No. 8 piloted by Bob Johnson and Bruce Jennings. The first couple of qualifying sessions saw the 2F top the timing charts, with a 3:27.4 and 3:24.7 on Wednesday and Thursday, respectively. Hill looked set to be on pole, but Bruce McLaren posted a 3:24.4 towards the evening, taking pole away just as qualifying ended. Spence was to take the start but got away slowly as Ronnie Bucknum of Shelby American took the lead in his Ford GT40 Mk II. Spence climbed back through the places, running third by the seventh hour. The No. 8 of Johnson and Jennings retired shortly before 11 p.m, after their battery and starter motor gave out. The No. 8 also faced mechanical issues as the wing became stuck in the high-downforce position, significantly crippling their straight-line speed. The remaining 2F would remain in or near the podium places in the early hours of the morning, despite its hindrance, but pitted shortly after 5 a.m. after a transmission seal broke. Instead of opting to retire, Hall decided it would be better to attempt a repair. The regulations stipulated that only two persons could work on a car while it was in the pits, and Hall predicted a full transmission replacement, necessitated by the way the 2F was designed, would take two to three hours with the available manpower. Almost three hours later, the 2F re-emerged 17th, and was met with an ovation from the crowd. However, the gearbox would fail for good almost an hour later, and with that both 2Fs were out of the race.

At the final round at the BOAC 500, the transmission's frailty had finally been resolved, with strengthened drive shafts, seals and bearings finally arriving. Qualifying saw the 2F almost a second back from the pole-sitting Lola T70 Mk III of Jack Brabham and Denny Hulme. The 2F had a slow start as usual, but Spence would be leading by the end of the first hour. Spence pitted half an hour later to hand over the car to Hill and for fuel. This allowed Pedro Rodríguez in his Mirage M1 to briefly lead, until he in turn pitted and handed the lead to Jo Siffert in his Porsche 910. By the second hour, Hill was running second behind Siffert, and closing in on the Swiss driver. A rear puncture in the third hour delayed Hill's charge, and a quick pitstop allowed Hill to rejoin in second, as Siffert had just pitted allowing Chris Amon to take the lead in his Ferrari 330 P4. As Amon pitted later for refueling and the driver change, Hill inherited the lead. Spence took over just before the halfway mark from Hill, dropping him to third behind Amon's teammate Jackie Stewart and Siffert's teammate Bruce McLaren. Spence quickly passed the Porsche of McLaren but could not close the gap to the 330 P4 of Stewart. Paul Hawkins had a spin at the fourth hour, significantly damaging the rear bodywork, so much so that it was in danger of falling off completely. This created a dire situation within the Ferrari pit crew, Stewart, who was leading, was also due in for a fuel and driver change but there were not enough people to service both cars simultaneously. Hawkins was serviced first, and as a result Amon lost significant amounts of time as well as the lead to Spence, to Mauro Forghieri's displeasure. Shortly before the fifth hour, Spence made his last pit stop for fuel and changed seats with Hill, re-emerging almost twenty seconds ahead of Amon's Ferrari. Amon would later pit right before the end for a quick refuel and to switch places with Stewart, allowing Hill to take the checkered flag. Hill and Stewart had lapped the rest of the field in what was Hill and Spence's last victory in motorsports, the former retiring, and the latter fatally crashing during practice for the 1968 Indianapolis 500.

A move by the Fédération Internationale de l'Automobile to outlaw cars with displacements of 7 L (427 cu in) in 1968 meant that the 2F was no longer eligible for racing in the World Sportscar Championship, with Chaparral turning their efforts to the Can-Am series. Jim Hall, who raced Chaparral's Can-Am cars, broke his legs in an accident whilst piloting a Chaparral 2G at the last race of the 1968 Can-Am season; he would not race again but still continued to build race cars for customers.

== Legacy ==
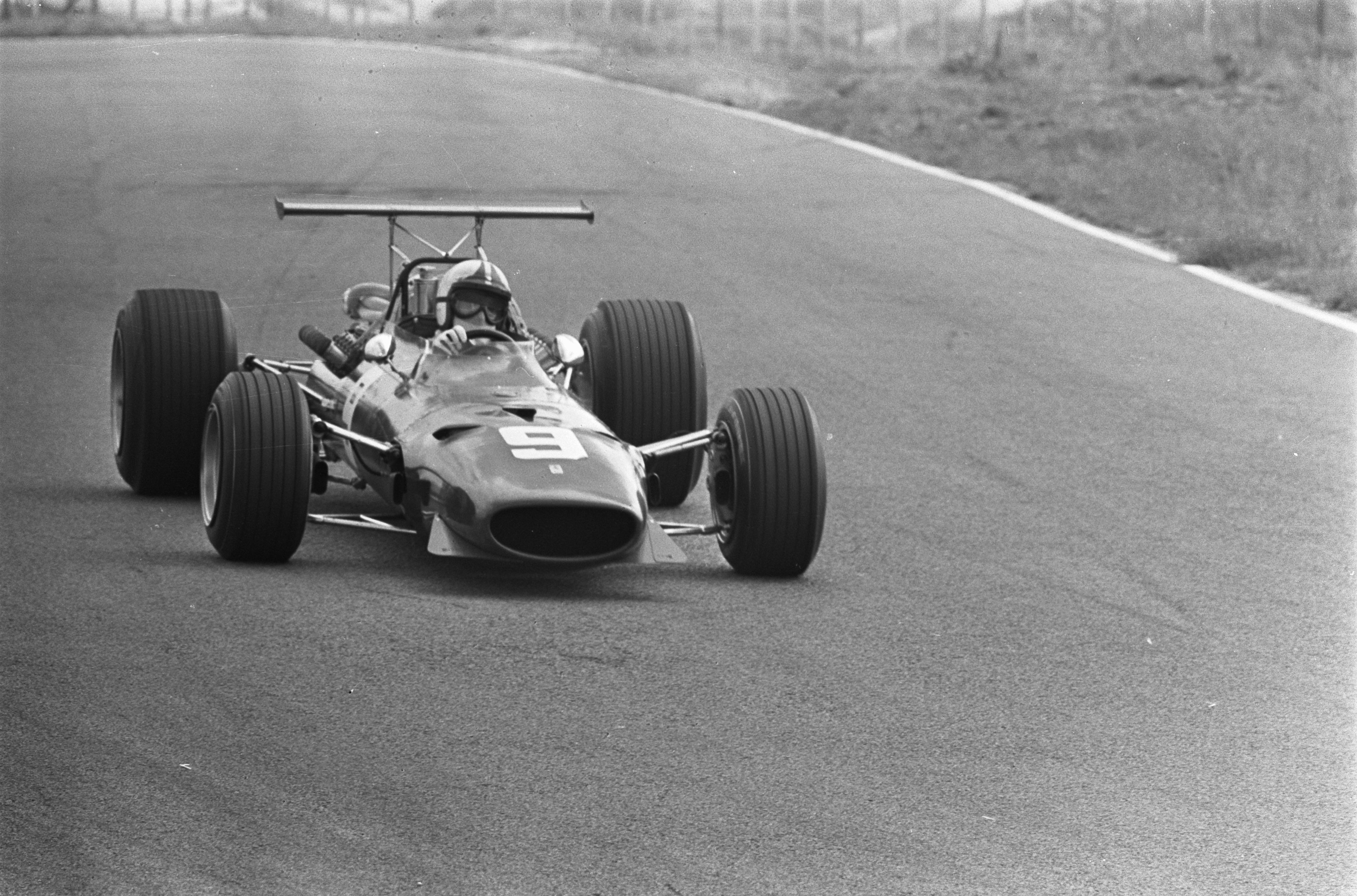
Chris Amon at the 1968 Dutch Grand Prix in his winged Ferrari 312, where he qualified on pole.

Jim Hall and Hap Sharp's rear airfoil preceded the ones in Formula One and provided much of their inspiration. The several Formula One drivers that participated in the 1967 World Sportscar Championship witnessed the performance and pace of the 2F, despite its mechanical troubles, increasing the interest in the implementation of aerodynamic features such as rear airfoils that the 2E had initiated. The burgeoning interest was led by a desire to increase mechanical grip as Formula One engines became increasingly more powerful for the tires they raced on, and cars were approaching the limit to how much mechanical grip they could extract solely from the tires. A wide array of rear airfoils appeared at the rear of several 1968 Formula One cars from the 1968 Belgian Grand Prix, although winglets had been trialed by Colin Chapman (who is credited with ushering in wings to Formula One) earlier at that year's Monaco Grand Prix. Throughout the season, more and more teams arrived at grand prix with wings. The adjustable nature of Hall and Sharp's rear wings is also similar to the drag reduction system implemented in Formula One, where a driver at the press of a button is able to reduce their car's drag coefficient by opening the rear wing to aid in overtaking in designated zones.

As the rear airfoils of varying designs and shapes proliferated, numerous crashes and accidents related to the wings saw the Fédération Internationale de l'Automobile step in and set limits on the size and the structural rigidity of wings. Jochen Rindt was one of the most vehement opponents of the wings, opposing them both on safety grounds and on the principle that they did not belong on Formula One cars. Rindt had a large shunt at the 1969 Spanish Grand Prix due to the failure of his high rear wing, suffering cuts and broken bones within his face. Rindt then raced in a car that was voluntarily devoid of all wing-like devices for the 1970 Italian Grand Prix, where he would suffer a fatal crash during practice in his Lotus 72.

== Racing results ==
=== Complete World Sportscar Championship results ===
(key) Races in bold indicates pole position. Races in italics indicates fastest lap.

Complete World Sportscar Championship results
Year	Entrant	Class	Drivers	No.	Rds.	Rounds								Pts.	Pos.
Year	Entrant	Class	Drivers	No.	Rds.	1	2	3	4	5	6	7	8	Pts.	Pos.
1967	(United States) Chaparral Cars	Group 6	(United States) Phil Hill (United States) Mike Spence (United States) Jim Hall (United States) Hap Sharp	Varies by race	1, 3–8; 1–4, 6–8; 2; 5	DAY; Ret	SEB; Ret	**MON**; Ret	**SPA**; Ret	**TGA**; Ret	NÜR; Ret	LMS; Ret	BRH; 1	9	4th
1967	(United States) Chaparral Cars	Group 6	(United States) Bruce Jennings (United States) Bob Johnson	8	7; 7							LMS; Ret		9	4th
