= Chaparral 2J =

Group 7 racing car

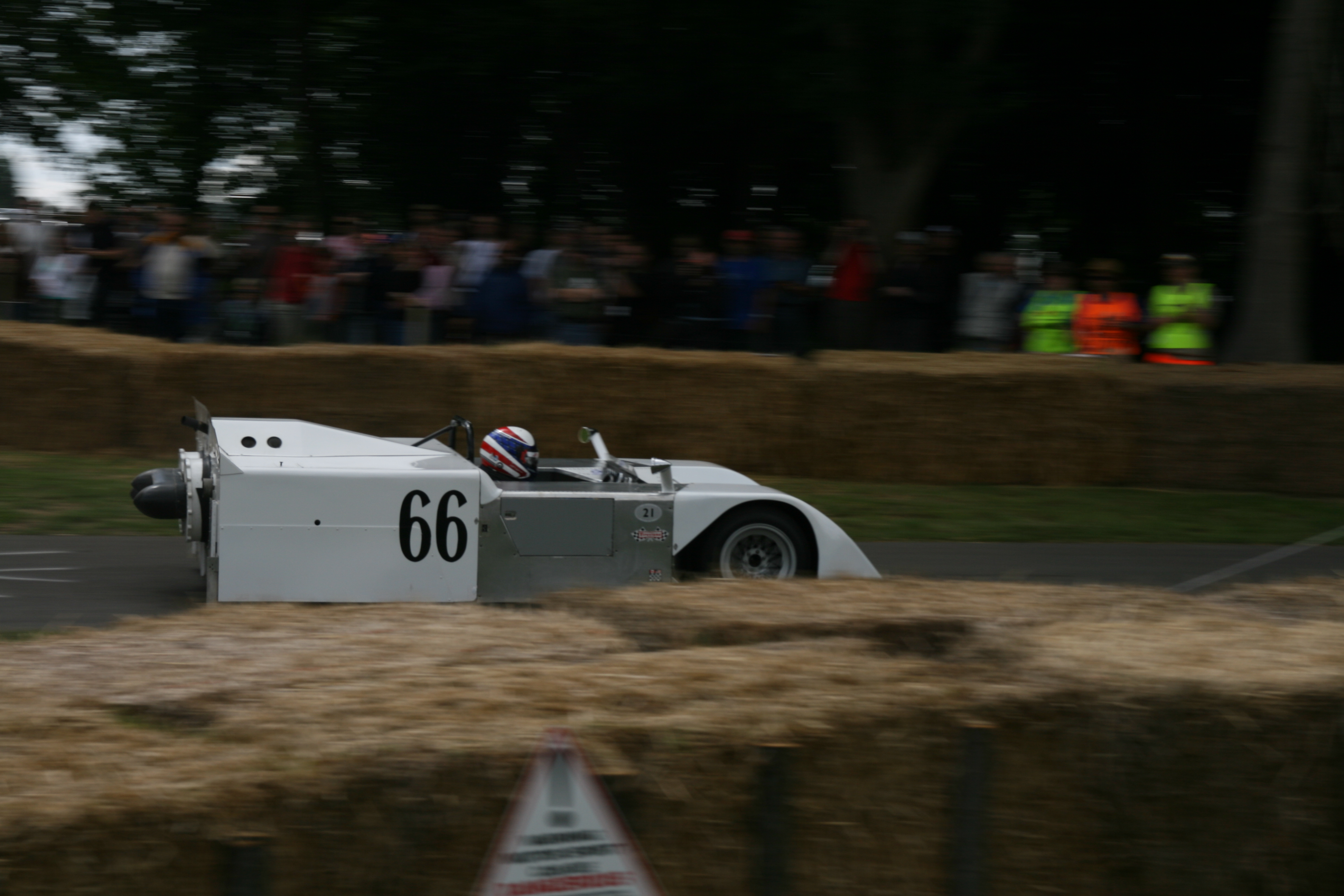
- The Chaparral 2J at the Goodwood Festival of Speed
- Category: Group 7
- Constructor: Chaparral Cars
- Designers: Jim Hall; Hap Sharp
- Production: 1970

Technical specifications
- Chassis: Reinforced aluminum alloy monocoque, fiberglass body
- Suspension (front): double wishbones, coil springs over shock absorbers, anti-roll bar
- Suspension (rear): DeDion axle, leading arms, coil springs over self-levelling shock absorbers, anti-roll bar
- Length: 145 in (3,700 mm)
- Width: 78 in (2,000 mm)
- Axle track: 60 in (1,500 mm) (front); 55 in (1,400 mm) (rear)
- Wheelbase: 84–95 in (2,100–2,400 mm)
- Engine: Chevrolet 427–465 cu in (6,997–7,620 cc) all-aluminum Big-block OHV V8 naturally aspirated mid-engined, longitudinally mounted
- Transmission: Chaparral 3-speed automatic/semi-automatic
- Power: 650–760 hp (485–567 kW) @ 6,800 rpm 650 lb⋅ft (880 N⋅m) @ 5,600 rpm
- Weight: 1,800 lb (820 kg)
- Brakes: Solid discs
- Tires: Firestone; Chaparral cast-alloy one-piece center-locking 16 in wheels

Competition history
- Notable entrants: (United States) Chaparral Cars Inc.
- Debut: 1970 Labatt's Blue Trophy Mosport
| Races | Wins | Podiums | Poles | F/Laps |
|---|---|---|---|---|
| 18 | 1 | 4 | 0 | 0 |

The Chaparral 2J is a sports prototype race car, designed and developed by Jim Hall and Hap Sharp, and built by American manufacturer Chaparral. It conformed to Group 7 regulations and competed in the 1970 Can-Am Championship series. It is an early example of a ground effect racing car.

== Overview ==
The 2J was the most unusual Chaparral. On the chassis' sides bottom edges were articulated plastic skirts that sealed against the ground (a technology that would later appear in Formula One). Two fans adapted from a military tank engine were housed at the rear, driven by a single two-stroke twin-cylinder engine. The car had a "skirt" made of Lexan extending to the ground on both sides, laterally on the back of the car, and laterally from just aft of the front wheels. It was integrated with the suspension system so the bottom of the skirt would maintain a distance of one inch from the ground regardless of g-forces or anomalies in the road surface. The skirting produced a zone within which the fans could create a vacuum producing downforce on the order of 1.25 to 1.50 g when the car was fully loaded (fuel, oil, coolant). Tremendous gripping power and greater maneuverability at all speeds were produced. Since it created the same levels of low pressure under the car at all speeds, downforce did not decrease at lower speeds. With other aerodynamic devices, downforce decreased as the car slowed or reached too much of a slip angle.

The 2J competed in the Can-Am series and qualified at least two seconds quicker than the next fastest car, but mechanical problems limited its success. It only ran in the 1970 season, after which it was outlawed by the Sports Car Club of America (SCCA). Although originally approved by the SCCA, they succumbed to pressure from other teams who argued that the fans constituted "movable aerodynamic devices". Sanctioning body FIA had banned such devices beginning with the 2E. There were also complaints of track debris sucked in and exhausted by the fans, hindering or even damaging the chasing cars. McLaren argued that if the 2J were not outlawed, the Can-Am series would be ruined by its dominance – though McLaren had been dominating since 1967.

Unusually, the Chaparral 2J only had three gears, being fitted in an automatic transmission, with the first gear providing 110 kilometres per hour (68 mph). The engine overall was capable of producing 680 brake horsepower (510 kW) at 7,000 revolutions per minute, with the max speed of roughly 360 kilometres per hour (220 mph). The weight of the 2J was under 1,800 pounds (820 kg).

== Other cars with similar methods ==
A similar fan was used in Formula One eight years later on the Brabham BT46B, which won the 1978 Swedish Grand Prix; the company reverted to the fanless BT46 soon afterward due to concern for a rules violation. The car was later deemed to have been within FIA technical specifications.

== Gallery ==
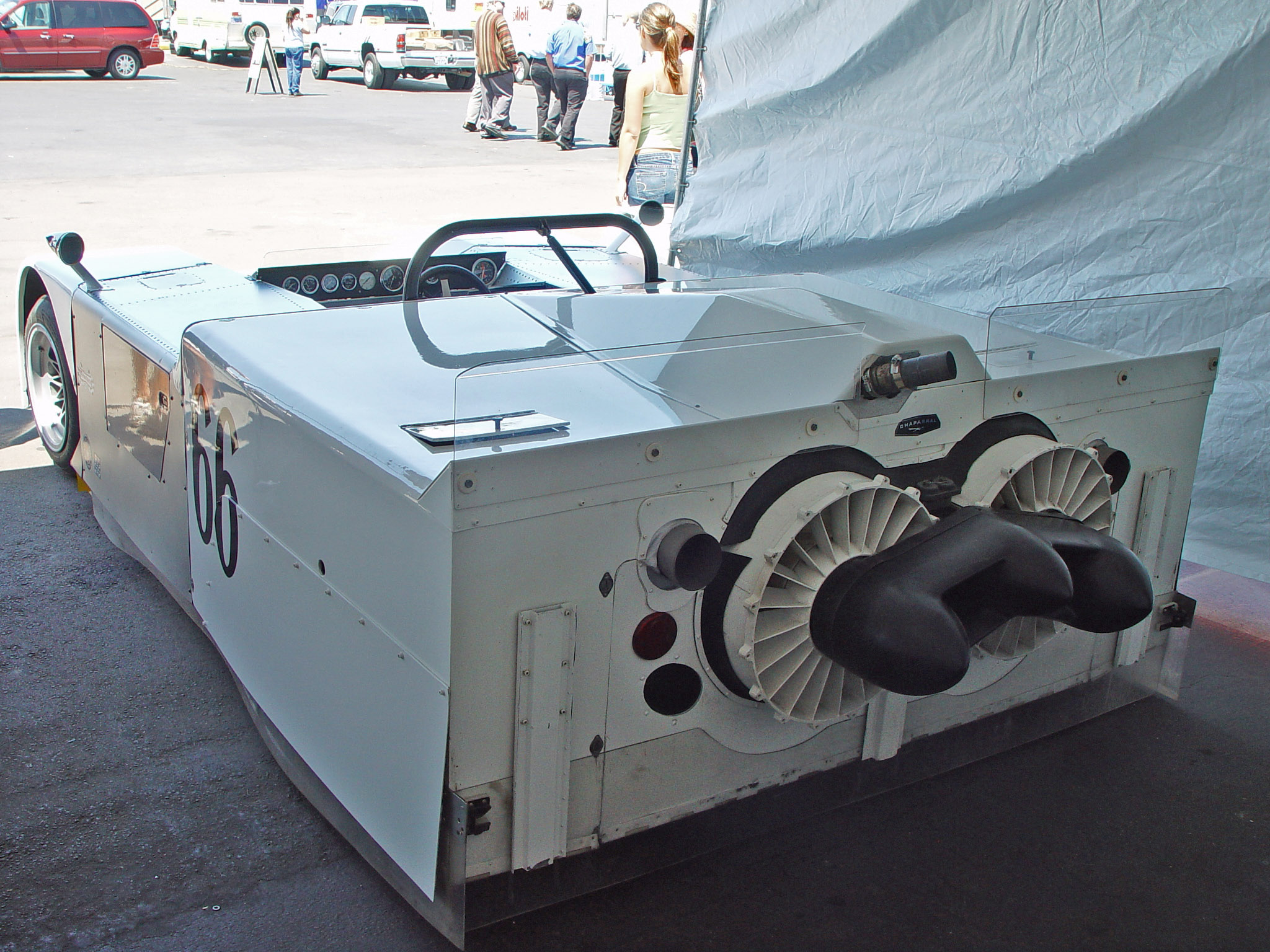
The 2J has two large suction fans emerging from its rear.

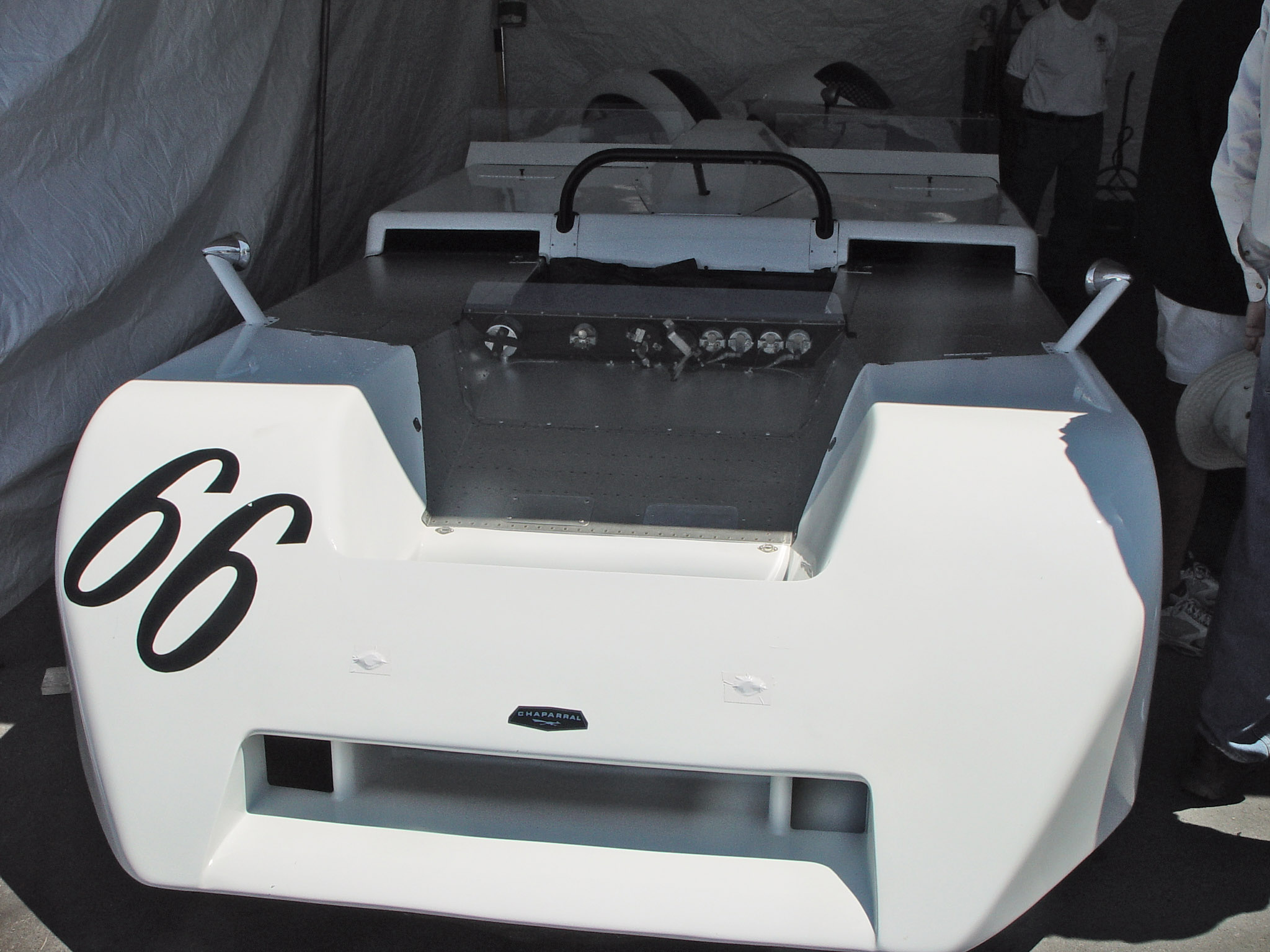
The Chaparral 2J on display at the 2005 Monterey Historic Motorsport Festival

== See also ==
- Gordon Murray Automotive T.50
