= Chaparral 2A =

Group 6 racing car by Chaparral

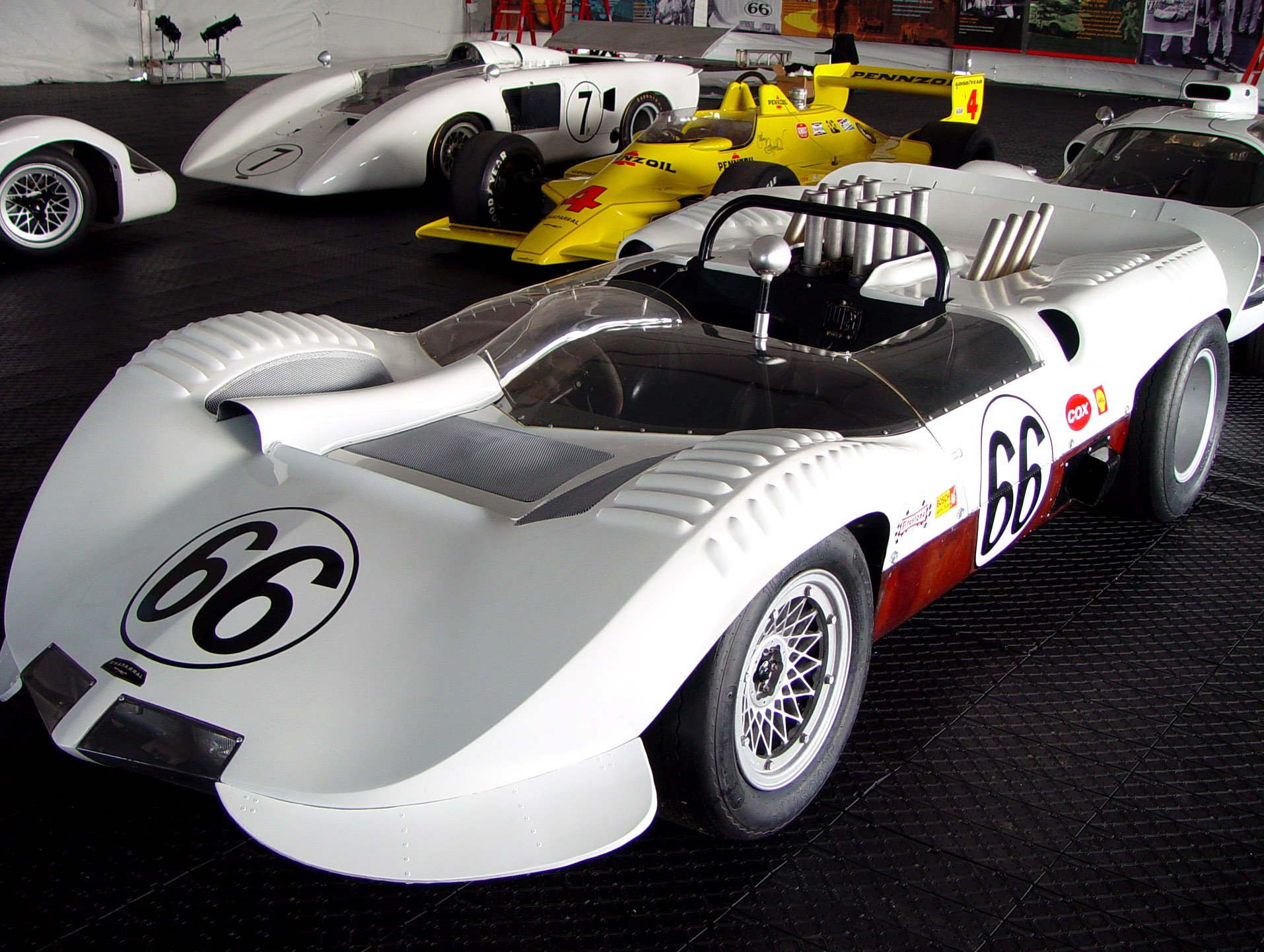
- Category: Sports prototype
- Constructor: Chaparral Cars
- Designer(s): Jim Hall; Hap Sharp
- Production: 1963-1965 (4 models built)

Technical specifications
- Chassis: Reinforced steel/fibreglass monocoque
- Suspension (front): double wishbones, coil springs over shock absorbers, anti-roll bar
- Suspension (rear): reversed lower wishbones, single top links, twin trailing arms, coil springs over shock absorbers, anti-roll bar
- Length: 158 in (4,000 mm)
- Width: 68 in (1,700 mm)
- Height: 33.7 in (860 mm)
- Axle track: 56 in (1,400 mm) (front); 53 in (1,300 mm) (rear)
- Wheelbase: 91 in (2,300 mm)
- Engine: Chevrolet 327 cu in (5,359 cc) all-aluminum small-block OHV V8 naturally aspirated mid-engined, longitudinally mounted
- Transmission: GM 2-speed automatic
- Power: 475 hp (354 kW) @ 6,800 rpm
- Weight: 1,650 lb (750 kg)
- Brakes: Solid discs
- Tires: Firestone; Chaparral cast-alloy one-piece center-locking 16 in wheels

Competition history
- Notable entrants: (United States) Chaparral Cars Inc.
- Debut: 1963 12 Hours of Sebring
| Races | Wins | Podiums |
|---|---|---|
| 22 | 2 | 2 |

The Chaparral 2A is a sports prototype race car designed and developed by both Jim Hall and Hap Sharp, and built by American manufacturer Chaparral, to compete in the World Sportscar Championship between 1963 and 1965. Its best result was a 1st-place finish at the 1965 12 Hours of Sebring, as well as another first-place finish at the 1965 Double 500 km at Bridgehampton.
