= Chaparral 1 =

Sports racing car by Chaparral

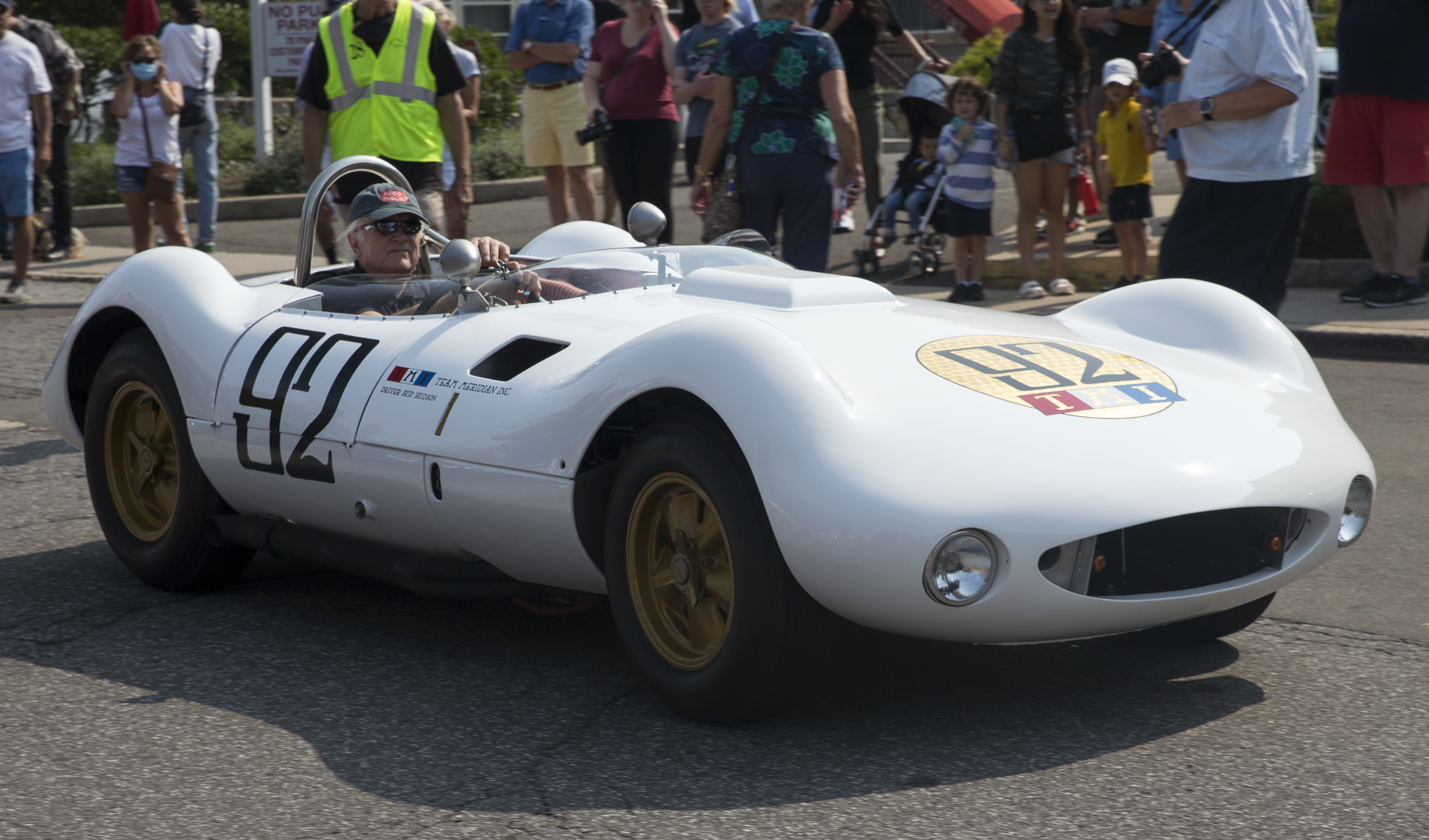
- Category: Sports car racing
- Constructor: Chaparral Cars
- Designer(s): Dick Troutman; Tom Barnes
- Production: 1958–1963 (five models built)

Technical specifications
- Chassis: Aluminum body over steel tubular spaceframe
- Suspension (front): double wishbones, coil springs over Monroe shock absorbers, anti-roll bar
- Suspension (rear): reverse A-arms, twin trailing arms, coil springs over Monroe shock absorbers, anti-roll bar
- Length: 153 in (3,900 mm)
- Width: 62 in (1,600 mm)
- Height: 31 in (790 mm)
- Axle track: 50 in (1,300 mm) (front); 50 in (1,300 mm) (rear)
- Wheelbase: 88 in (2,200 mm)
- Engine: Chevrolet 318–327 cu in (5,211–5,359 cc) all-aluminum small-block OHV V8 naturally aspirated mid-engined, longitudinally mounted
- Transmission: Chevrolet 4-speed manual
- Power: 300–400 hp (224–298 kW) @ 6,500 rpm
- Weight: 1,480 lb (670 kg)
- Brakes: Solid discs
- Tires: Firestone; Chaparral cast-alloy one-piece center-locking 16 in wheels

Competition history
- Notable entrants: USA Chaparral Cars Inc.
- Debut: 1958

The Chaparral 1 was a sports racing car, designed, developed and built by Dick Troutman and Tom Barnes, and raced by Jim Hall, between 1958 and 1961. It is considered to be the first true "Chaparral," prior to the introduction and founding of Chaparral Cars by Hall in 1962.
