= Chaparral 2C =

Group 6 racing car by Chaparral

- Category: Sports prototype
- Constructor: Chaparral Cars
- Designers: Jim Hall; Hap Sharp
- Production: 1965

Technical specifications
- Chassis: Reinforced aluminum alloy monocoque, fiberglass body
- Suspension (front): unequal-length double wishbones, coil springs over tubular shock absorbers, anti-roll bar, anti-drive geometry
- Suspension (rear): unequal-length reversed lower wishbones, single top links, twin trailing arms, coil springs over shock absorbers, anti-roll bar, anti-drive/squat geometry
- Length: 158 in (4,000 mm)
- Width: 68 in (1,700 mm)
- Height: 33.7 in (860 mm)
- Axle track: 56 in (1,400 mm) (front); 53 in (1,300 mm) (rear)
- Wheelbase: 91 in (2,300 mm)
- Engine: Chevrolet 327 cu in (5,359 cc) all-aluminum small-block OHV V8 naturally aspirated mid-engined, longitudinally mounted
- Transmission: GM 2-speed automatic
- Power: 415–475 hp (309–354 kW) @ 6,800 rpm 380 lb⋅ft (520 N⋅m) torque
- Weight: 1,550–1,700 lb (700–770 kg)
- Brakes: Solid discs
- Tires: Firestone; Chaparral cast-alloy one-piece center-locking 16 in wheels

Competition history
- Notable entrants: (United States) Chaparral Cars Inc.
- Debut: 1965
Races	Wins	Podiums	Poles	F/Laps
4	0	0	0	0

The Chaparral 2C is a sports prototype race car designed and developed by both Jim Hall and Hap Sharp, and built by American manufacturer Chaparral in October 1965, to compete in a few non-championship sports car races that same year.
