= Chaparral 2D =

Group 6 racing car by Chaparral

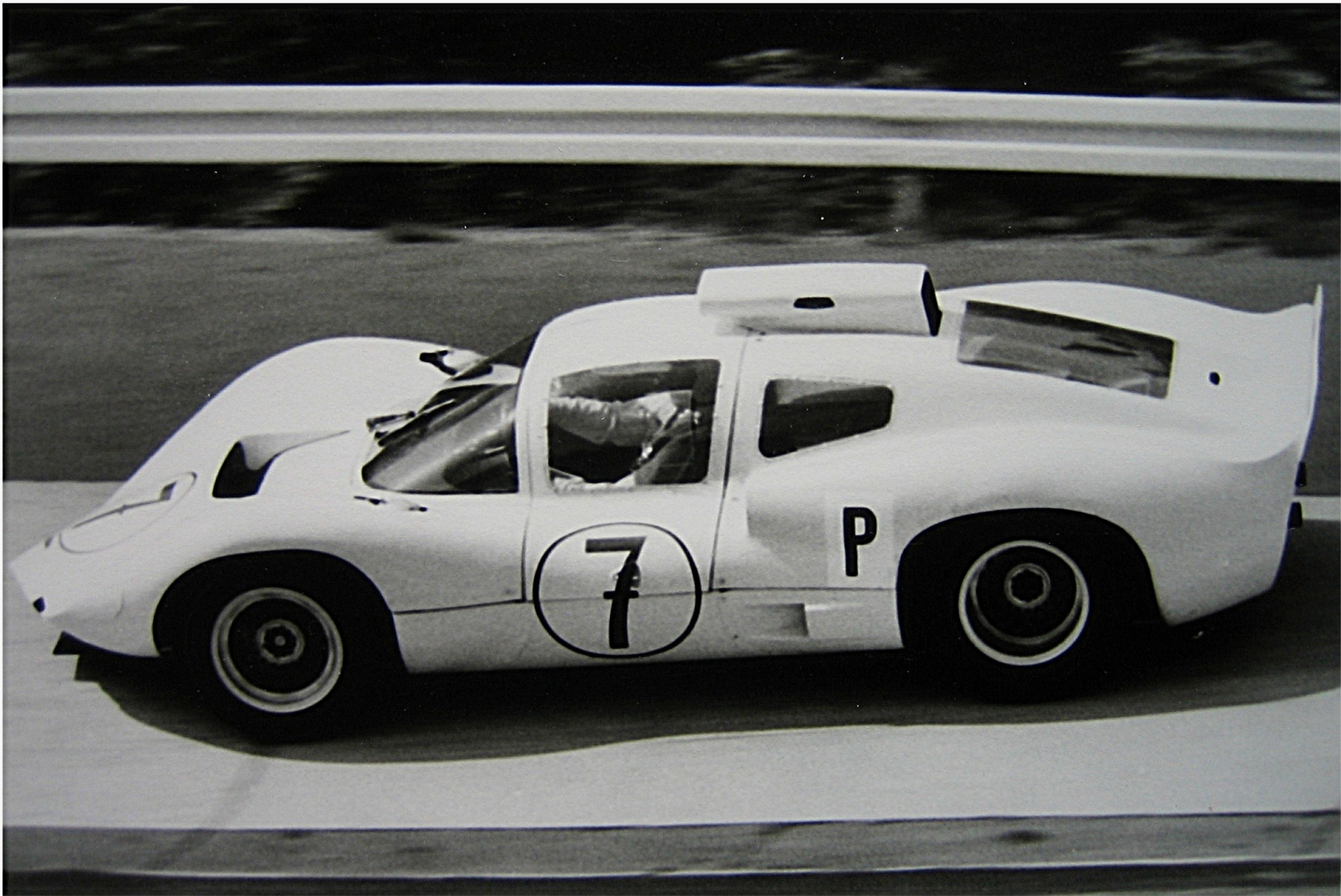
- Category: Group 6
- Designer(s): Jim Hall; Hap Sharp
- Production: 1965

Technical specifications
- Chassis: Fiberglass monocoque, fiberglass body
- Suspension (front): unequal-length double wishbones, coil springs over tubular shock absorbers, anti-roll bar, anti-drive geometry
- Suspension (rear): unequal-length reversed lower wishbones, single top links, twin trailing arms, coil springs over shock absorbers, anti-roll bar, anti-drive/squat geometry
- Length: 158 in (4,000 mm)
- Width: 68 in (1,700 mm)
- Height: 39.5 in (1,000 mm)
- Axle track: 56 in (1,400 mm) (front); 53 in (1,300 mm) (rear)
- Wheelbase: 91 in (2,300 mm)
- Engine: Chevrolet 327 cu in (5,359 cc) all-aluminum small-block OHV V8 naturally aspirated mid-engined, longitudinally mounted
- Transmission: Chaparral 3-speed automatic
- Power: 420 hp (313 kW) @ 6,800 rpm
- Weight: 2,040 lb (930 kg)
- Brakes: Solid discs
- Tires: Firestone; Chaparral cast-alloy one-piece center-locking 16 in wheels

Competition history
- Notable entrants: (United States) Chaparral Cars Inc.
- Debut: 1966 24 Hours of Daytona
Races	Wins	Podiums	Poles	F/Laps
6	1	0	0	0

The Chaparral 2D is a Group 6 sports prototype race car designed and developed by both Jim Hall and Hap Sharp, and built by American manufacturer Chaparral, which campaigned in the FIA World Sportscar Championship between 1966 and 1967. It famously won the 1966 1000 km Nürburgring, driven by Jo Bonnier and Phil Hill.
