= Chaparral Cars =

American automobile racing team and developer

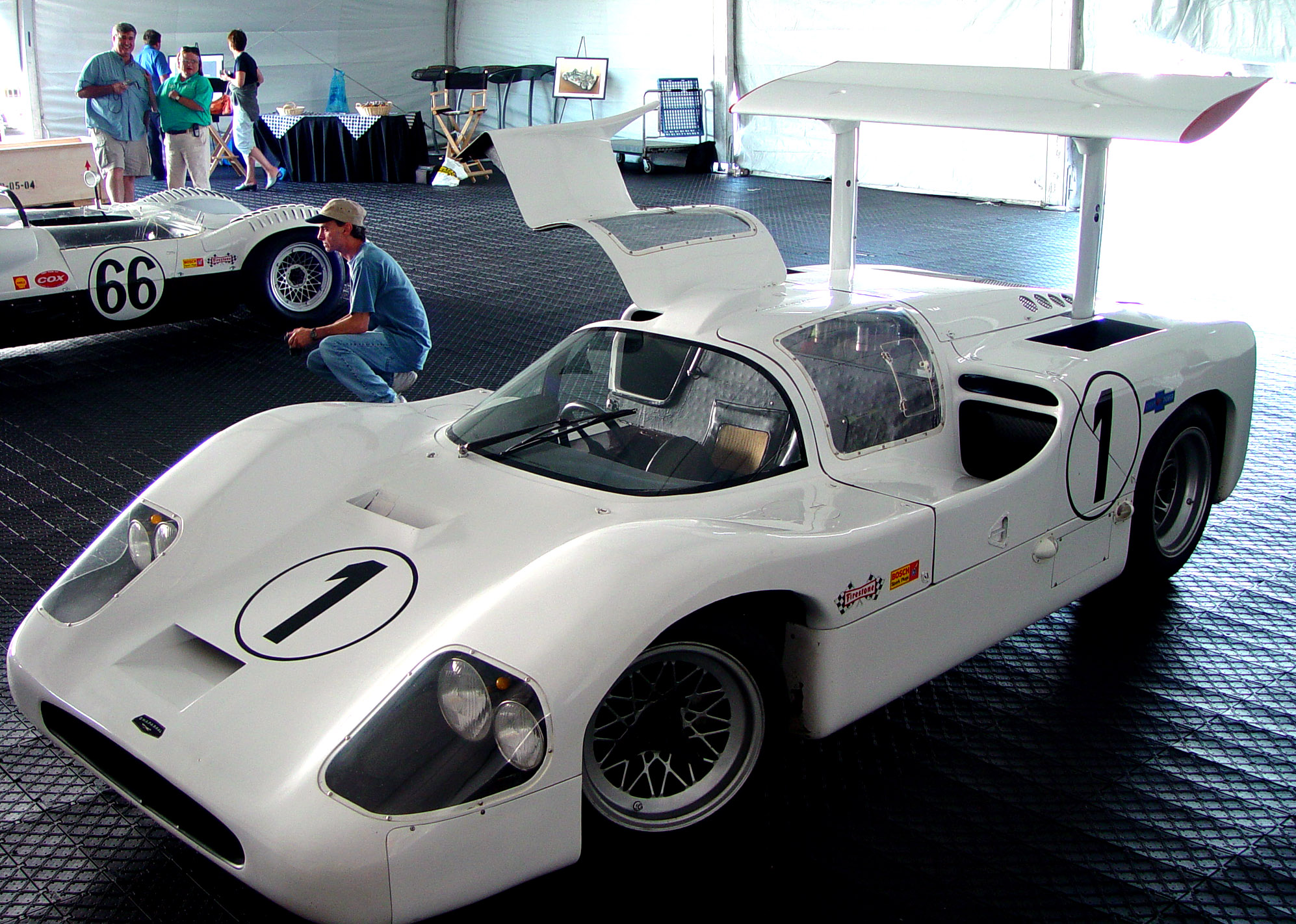
- Industry: Automotive Manufacturing
- Founded: 1962; 64 years ago
- Founder: Hap Sharp; Jim Hall
- Defunct: 1970

Chaparral Cars was an American automobile racing team and race car developer that engineered, built, and raced cars from 1963 through 1970. Founded in 1962 by American Formula One racers Hap Sharp and Jim Hall, it was named after the roadrunner, a fast-running ground cuckoo also known as a chaparral bird.

== Background ==
Dick Troutman and Tom Barnes were builders of the original Chaparral race cars (later referred to as Chaparral 1). Jim Hall purchased two Chaparral 1s to race. When Hall and Sharp began building their own cars, they asked Troutman and Barnes if they could continue to use the Chaparral name. That is why the Hall/Sharp cars are all named Chaparral 2s (models 2A through 2J for sports cars/CanAm cars, and the 2K which was the 1979–1982 Indycar). Despite winning the Indianapolis 500 in 1980, they left motor racing in 1982. Chaparral cars also featured in the SCCA/CASC Can-Am series and Endurance racing.

Jim Hall was a leader in the innovation and design of spoilers, wings, and ground effects. A high point was the 1966 2E Can-Am car. The 2J Can-Am "sucker car" was the first "ground-effect" car.

The development of the Chaparral chronicles the key changes in race cars in the 1960s and 1970s in both aerodynamics and tires. Hall's training as an engineer taught him to approach problems in a methodical manner, and his access to the engineering teams at Chevrolet and at Firestone was instrumental in changing race car aerodynamics and handling from an art to an empirical science. The embryonic data acquisition systems created by the GM research and development group aided these efforts. An interview with Hall by Paul Haney illustrates many of these developments.

== Models ==
=== 1 ===
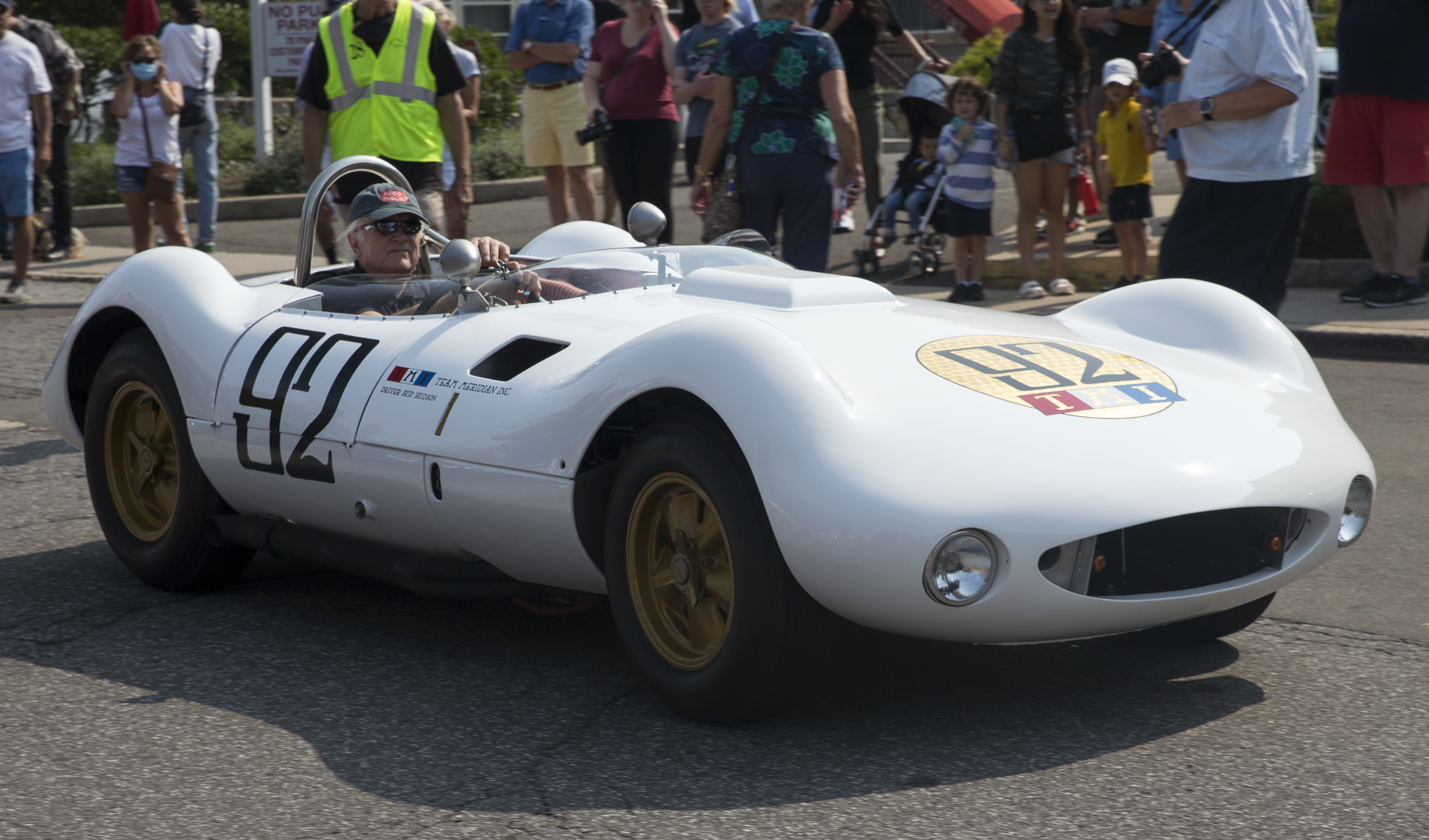
Chaparral 1 front

In 1957, Hall raced the front-engined Chaparral (retroactively called the "Chaparral 1") through 1962, bought from Troutman and Barnes (like the Scarab, the Chaparral 1 cars were built in California by Troutman and Barnes). Hall and Hap Sharp extensively modified their Chaparral and eventually decided to build their own car. They obtained permission from Troutman and Barnes to use the Chaparral name, which is why all of Hall's cars are called Chaparral 2s.

=== 2 ===
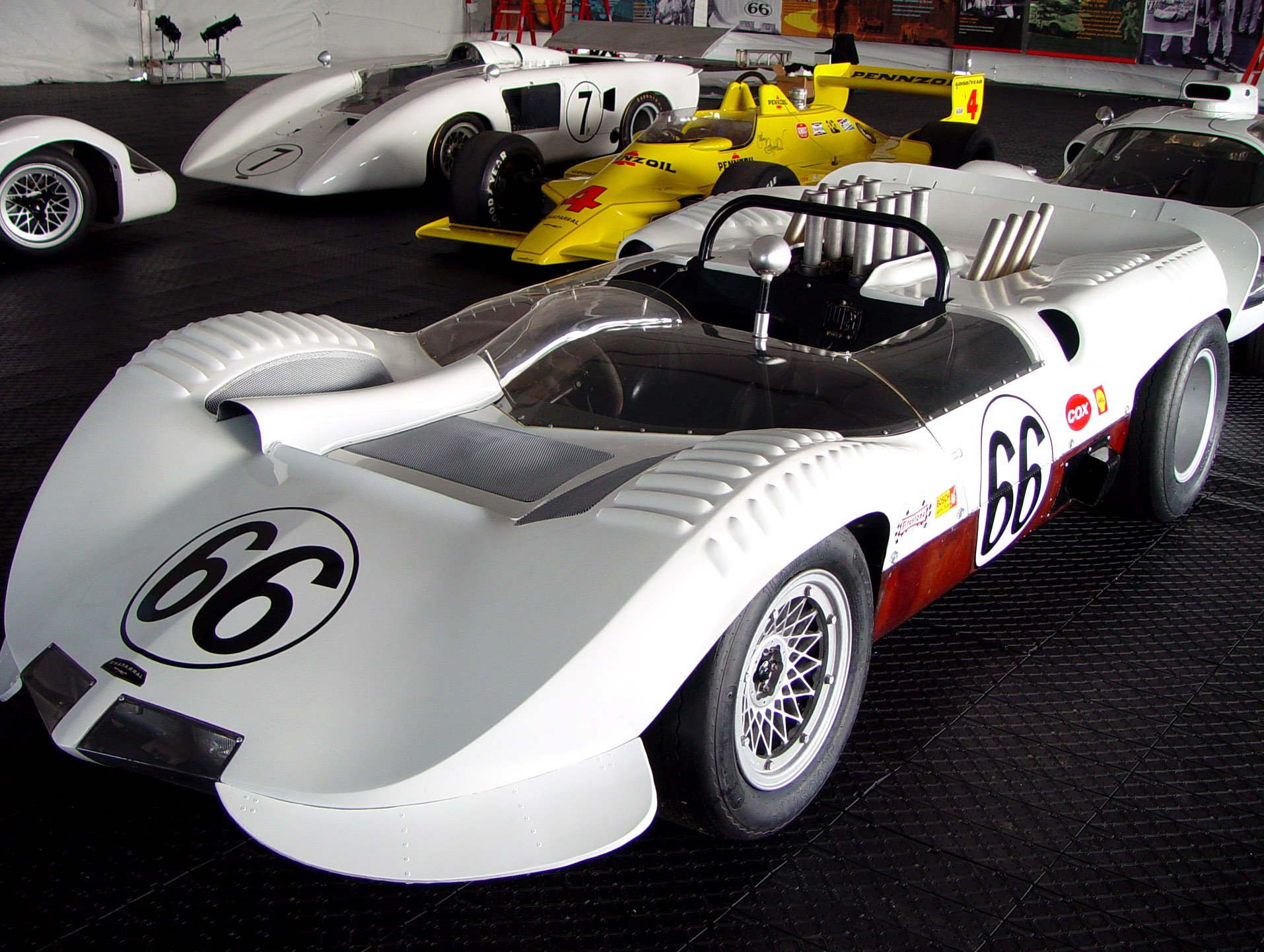
The Chaparral 2A at the 2005 Monterey Historic

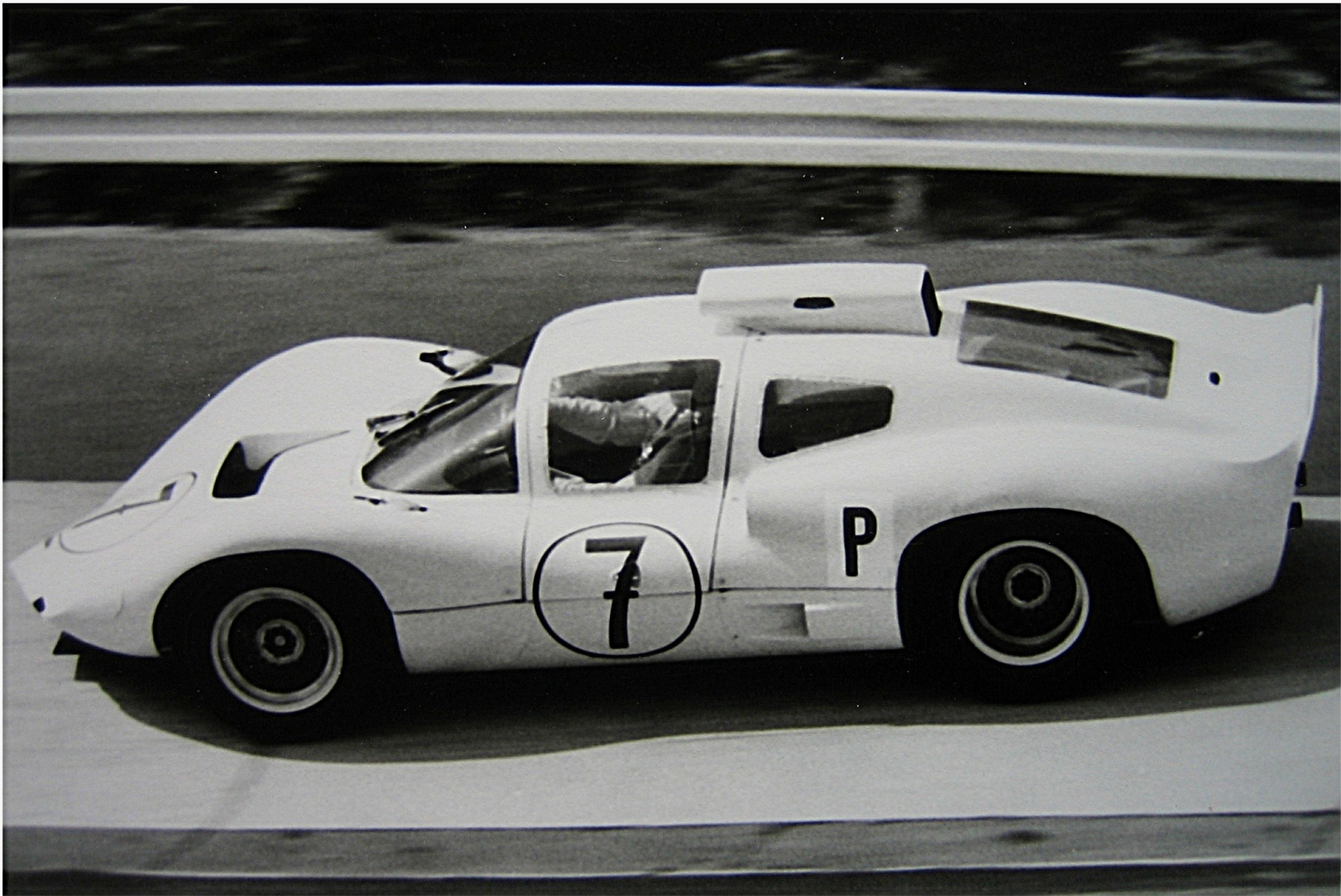
Joakim Bonnier 1966 in the Chaparral 2D during practice at the Nürburgring

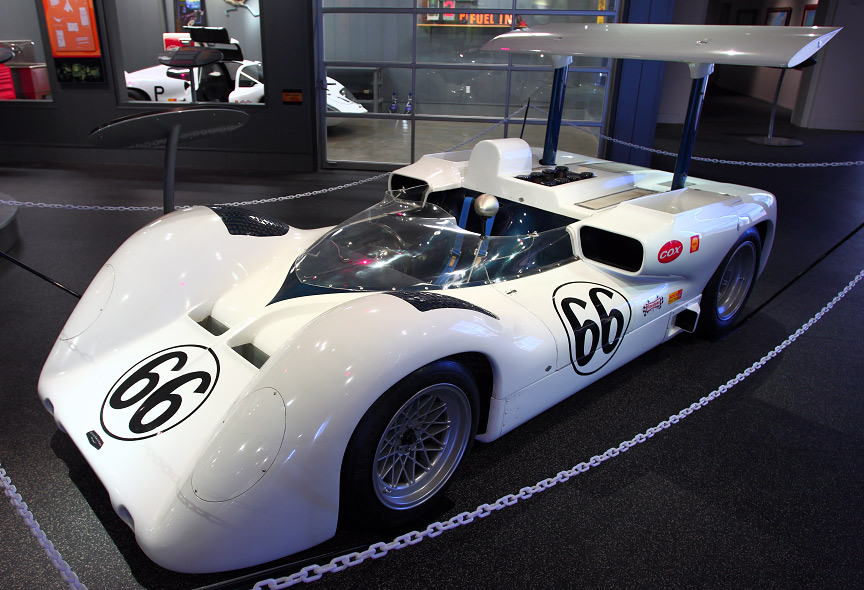
The Chaparral 2E

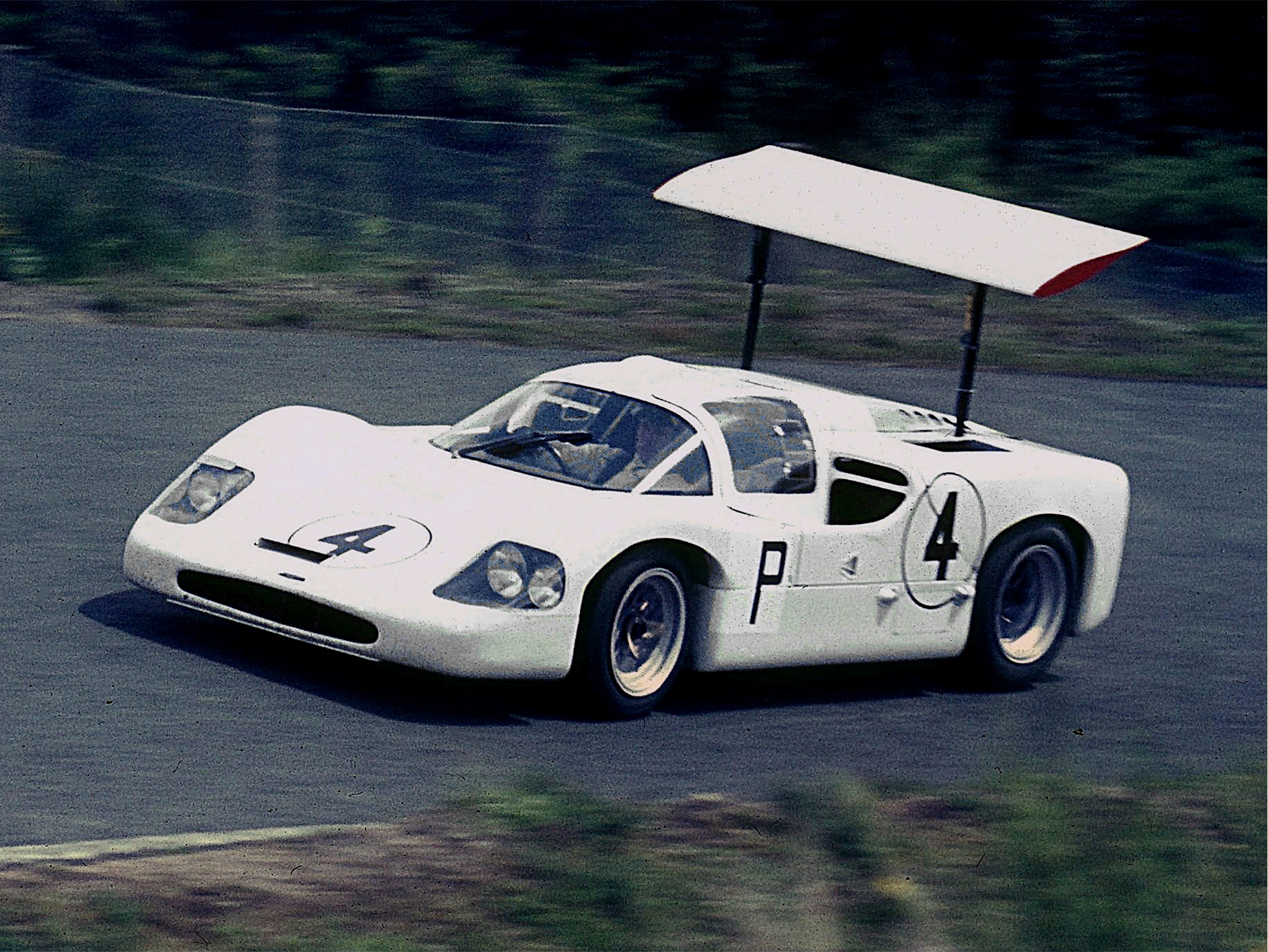
Mike Spence 1967 in the Chaparral 2F during practice at the Nürburgring Nordschleife

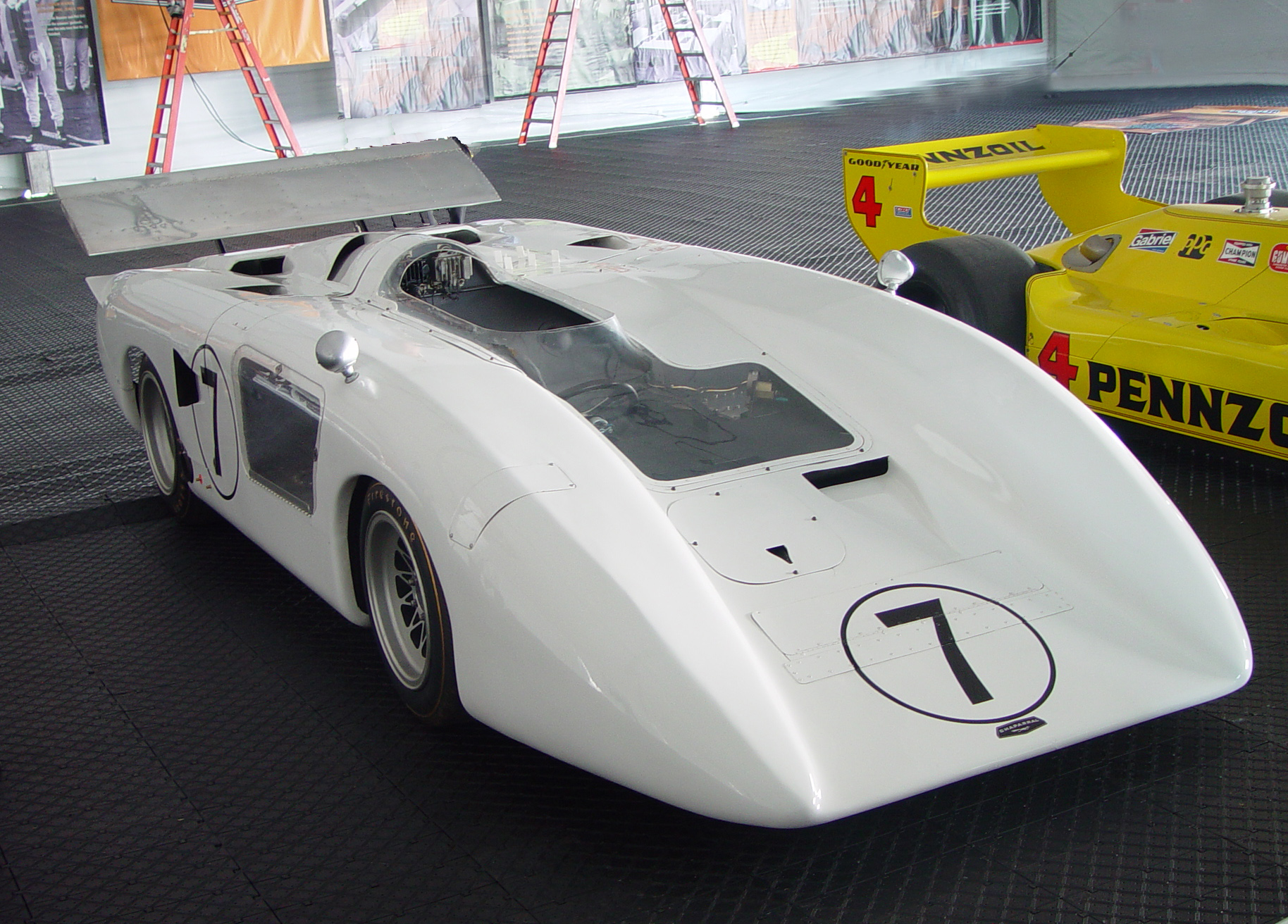
The Chaparral 2H at the 2005 Monterey Historic

The first Chaparral 2-series was designed and built to compete in the United States Road Racing Championship and other races of the time, particularly the West Coast Pro Series that were held each fall. Hall had significant "under the table" assistance from GM, including engineering and technical support in the development of the car and its automatic transmission (this is evidenced by the similarity between the Chevy Corvette GS-II "research and development" model and the Chaparral 2A through 2C models).

First raced in late 1963, the Chaparral 2 developed into a highly competitive car in the Can-Am series in 1966 and 1967. Designed for the 200-mile races of the Can-Am series, it was also a winner in longer endurance races. In 1965, it shocked the sports car world by winning the 12 Hours of Sebring in a pouring rainstorm, on one of the roughest tracks in North America.

The Chaparral 2 featured the innovative use of fiberglass as a chassis material. The Chaparral 2C had a conventional aluminum chassis.

It is very difficult to identify all iterations of the car as new ideas were being tested continually.

- The 2A is the car as originally raced, featuring a very conventional sharp edge to cut through the air. It also featured a concave tail reminiscent of the theories of Wunibald Kamm. The first aerodynamic appendages began to appear on the 2A almost immediately to cure a problem with the front end being very light at speed with a consequent impact on steering accuracy and driver confidence.
- As the car evolved, it grew and changed shape. Most call these 2B and were raced through the end of 1965.
- The 2C was the first Chaparral to use an in-car adjustable rear wing. Similar to the air-brake used in the Mercedes-Benz 300 SLR it was designed to lie flat for low drag on the straights and could be tipped-up for improved braking through corners. The car's clutchless, semi-automatic transmission kept the driver's left foot free to operate the wing mechanism. The 2C was based on a Chevrolet-designed aluminum chassis and was a smaller car in every dimension than the 2B. Without the natural non-resonant damping of the fiberglass chassis, Hap Sharp nicknamed it the EBJ — "eyeball jiggler".

Alongside the development of aerodynamics was Hall's development of race tires. Jim Hall owned Rattlesnake Raceway, located adjacent to his race shop; its proximity allowed him to participate in much of Firestone's race tire development.

A two-article series in Car and Driver magazine featured Hall's design theories, turning speculation about vehicle handling into applied physics. Hall's theories were the precursor to the elaborate data collection and management of current racing teams.

The 2D was the first closed cockpit variant of the 2-series, designed for endurance racing in 1966. It won at 1000 km Nürburgring in 1966 with Phil Hill and Joakim Bonnier driving. It also competed in the 1966 24 Hours of Le Mans, withdrawing after 111 laps. The 2D was equipped with a 327-cubic-inch (5.36 L) displacement aluminum alloy Chevrolet engine producing 420 horsepower (310 kW; 430 PS); the car weighed only 924 kg (2,037 lb).

=== 2E ===
The 2E was based on the Chevrolet-designed aluminum 2C chassis and presented Hall's most advanced aerodynamic theories to the racing world in 1966. The 2E established the paradigm for virtually all racing cars built since. It was startling in appearance, with its radiators moved from the traditional location in the nose to two ducted pods on either side of the cockpit and a large pivoting variable-incidence wing, mounted several feet above the rear of the car on struts. As opposed to an aircraft wing, it generated downforce instead of lift and was attached directly to the rear suspension uprights, loading the tires for extra adhesion while cornering. A ducted nose channeled air from the front of the car upwards, creating extra downforce as well. By depressing a floor pedal that was in the position of the clutch in other cars, Hall was able to feather or flatten out, the otherwise negative-incidence wing's angle when downforce was not needed (as on a straight track section) to reduce drag and increase top speed. An interconnected air dam also closed off the nose ducting for streamlining. When the pedal was released, the front ducting and wing returned to full downforce position. Until they were banned, many race cars, including some in Formula One, had wings on tall struts. The resulting accidents from their failures led to pivoting wings mounted on the suspension until these kind of moving parts were fully banned.

The 2E scored only one win, at the 1966 Laguna Seca Raceway Can-Am with Hill driving. Hall kept using an aluminum 5.3-liter Chevrolet engine in his lightweight racers while the other teams were using 6- to 7-liter iron engines, trading weight for power.

The 2E was a crowd favorite and remains Hall's favorite car.

=== 2F ===
In the 2F Hall applied the aerodynamic advances of the aluminum 2E to the older fiberglass chassis closed-cockpit 2D for the 1967 racing season. A movable wing mounted on struts loaded the rear suspension while an air dam kept the front end planted. The radiators were moved to positions next to the cockpit. An aluminum 7-liter Chevrolet 'big block' engine replaced the 5.3-liter engine of the 2D. While always extremely fast, the extra power of the larger engine was too much for the automatic transmission to handle and it broke with regularity. After solving the transmission problems, the 2F scored its only win on 30 July 1967 in the BOAC 500 at Brands Hatch with Hill and Mike Spence driving. After this race the FIA changed its rules, outlawing not only the 2F but also the Ford GT40 Mk.IV (winner at Le Mans that year) and the Ferrari 330 P3/4 (winner, 24 Hours of Daytona) and 365 P4 (finished second, Le Mans). As with the 2D, the 2F raced wearing Texas license plates.

The 1967 2G was a development of the 2E. It featured wider tires and a 427 cu in aluminum Chevrolet V-8 engine. While on par with its competitors in terms of power, the lightweight 2C chassis was stretched to the limit and it was only Hall's driving skills that kept the car competitive. For the 1968 Can-Am series, still larger tires were added to increase grip.

Hall's racing career was effectively ended in a severe crash at the Stardust Grand Prix Can-Am race when he rear-ended the slow-moving McLaren of Lothar Motschenbacher, although he did drive in the 1970 Trans-American Sedan Championship while fielding a team of Chevrolet Camaros.

Hall noted that the increasing downforce also created enormous drag. Seeking a competitive edge, the highly advanced 2H was built in 1968 as the replacement for the 2G to minimize drag. Not only was it extremely slippery, it was narrow to reduce frontal area. Development problems kept it out of the Can Am series, forcing Hall to update the 2G for the 1968 series, during which his catastrophic accident occurred. Hall was consistently the best driver for Chaparral and knew how to get the best out of his cars. John Surtees was brought in as driver for the 1969 Can Am series but never figured out how to drive the 2H to take advantage of its low drag potential. Surtees complained he couldn't see out of the car and demanded a redesign which ruined the aerodynamics, then ran the rear wing almost upright, negating any advantage of the compact slippery shape. Ultimately, by 1969 the massive amount of power being generated from the big block Chevrolet engines that Hall effectively debugged in 1967 and 1968, downforce was more important than low drag. Had the 2H kept the low drag shape but with a wider track it most likely would have been very competitive, but the true monocoque construction made changes to the chassis almost impossible.

=== 2J ===
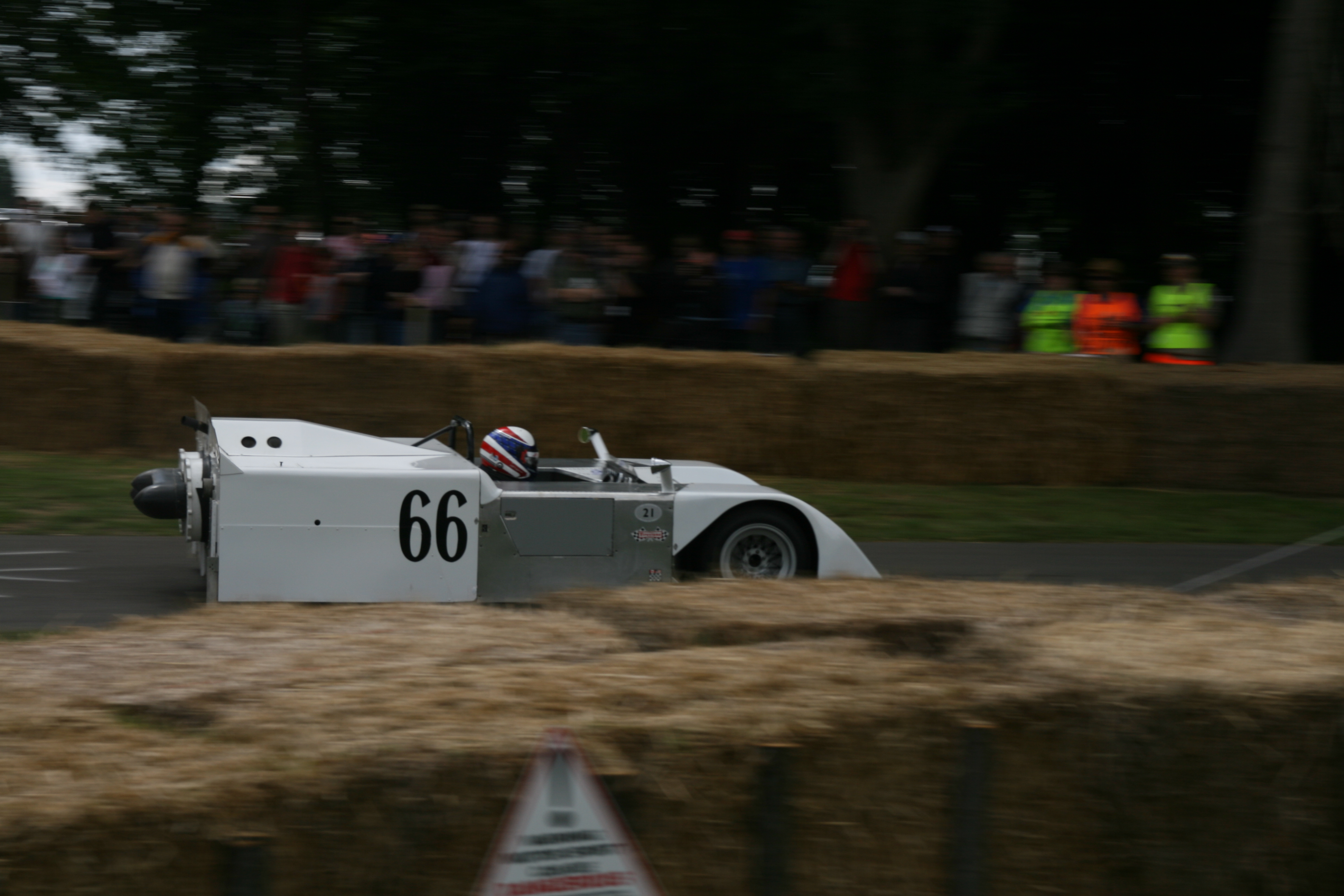
The Chaparral 2J at the Goodwood Festival of Speed

The most unusual Chaparral was the 2J. On the chassis' sides bottom edges were articulated Lexan plastic skirts that sealed against the ground (a technology that would later appear in Formula One). Two fans adapted from a military tank engine were housed at the rear, driven by a single two-stroke twin-cylinder engine. The skirting produced a zone within which the fans could create a vacuum producing downforce on the order of 1.25 to 1.50 g when the car was fully loaded (fuel, oil, coolant). Tremendous gripping power and greater maneuverability at all speeds were produced.

The 2J competed in the Can-Am series and qualified at least two seconds quicker than the next fastest car, but mechanical problems limited its success. It only ran in the 1970 season, after which it was outlawed by the Sports Car Club of America (SCCA). Although originally approved by the SCCA, they succumbed to pressure from other teams who argued that the fans constituted "movable aerodynamic devices". Sanctioning body FIA had banned such devices beginning with the 2E. There were also complaints of debris generated by the fans damaging the following cars. McLaren argued that if the 2J were not outlawed, the Can-Am series would be ruined by its dominance – something McLaren had been doing since 1967. A similar fan was used in Formula One in 1978 on the Brabham BT46B.

=== 2K ===
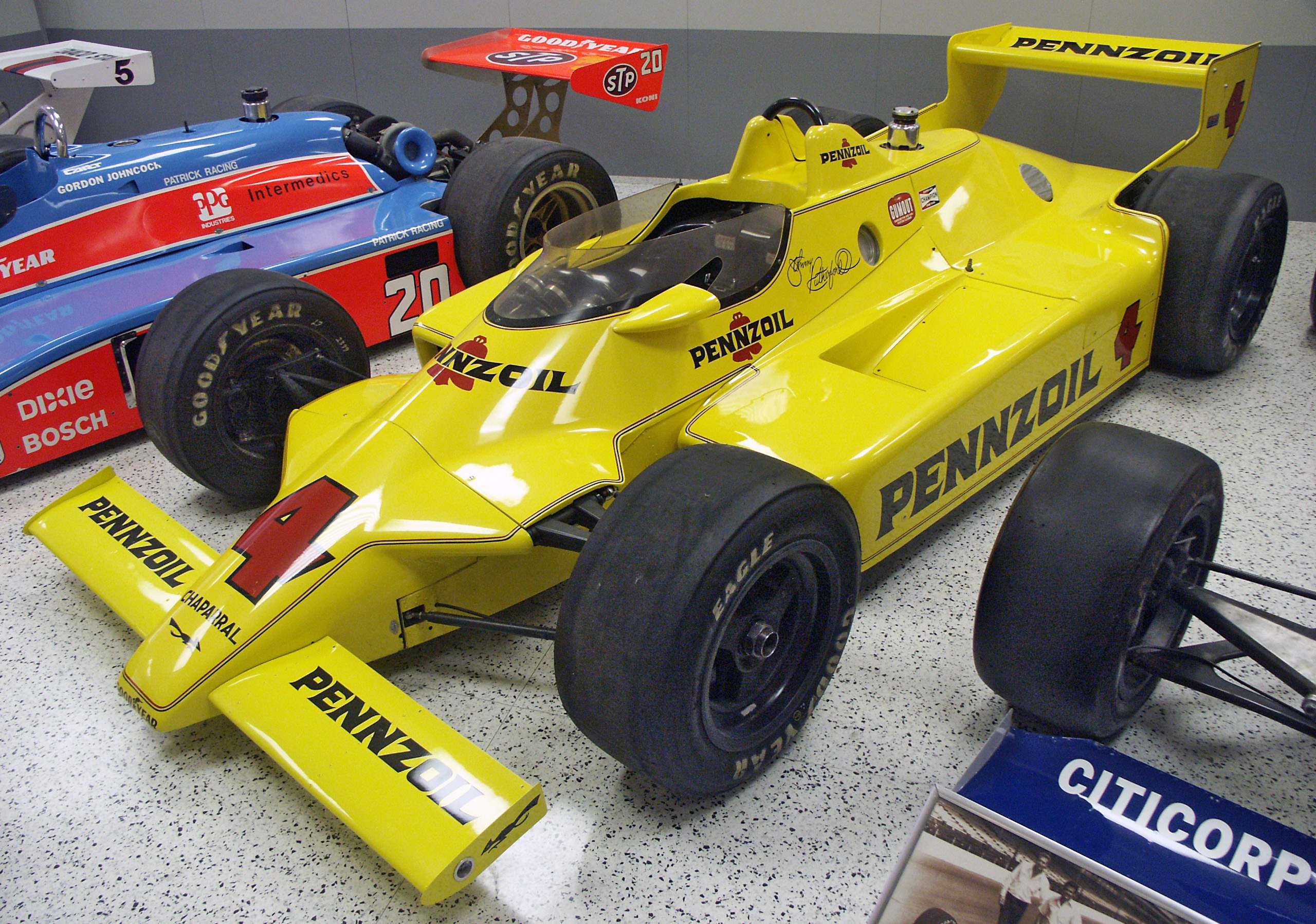
Chaparral 2K on display in the Indianapolis Motor Speedway Hall of Fame Museum

The 2K was a Formula One-inspired ground effect Indy car designed by Briton John Barnard. Debuting in 1979 with driver Al Unser Sr., it went on to win six races in 27 starts over three seasons. Its greatest success came in 1980 when Johnny Rutherford won both the Indy 500 and CART championship.

== Indy car team ==
=== 1970s ===
Chaparral started fielding Indy cars in 1978 with Al Unser driving the No. 2 First National City Traveler's Checks Lola T500-Cosworth DFX. Unser then managed to win the 1978 Indianapolis 500. Later in the season Unser added wins at the California 500 at Ontario Motor Speedway and the Schaefer 500 at Pocono International Raceway; this remains the only time a driver has won the Triple Crown. Despite these wins, Unser lost the championship to Tom Sneva (who failed to win a race). With the formation of CART, Hall fielded Unser in the No. 2 Pennzoil Lola T500-Cosworth DFX. At the 1979 Indianapolis 500, Hall and fellow CART board men Roger Penske, Pat Patrick, Teddy Mayer, Ted Field, and Robert Fletcher were initially not allowed to compete in the race since it was part of the USAC National Championship. At the same time Hall was going to introduce the Chaparral 2K-Cosworth DFX. In the race Unser lead for 89 of the 200 laps but an engine fire on lap 105 ended his participation. He later won the season-ending Miller High Life 150 at Phoenix International Raceway and finished fifth in CART standings but was ineligible for USAC points.

=== 1980s ===
By 1980 Unser was replaced by Johnny Rutherford after having disagreements with Hall. The only change to 2K was its number, now four. Rutherford won five races that season, including the 1980 Indianapolis 500, the Datsun Twin 200 at Ontario Motor Speedway, the Red Roof Inn 150 at the Mid-Ohio Sports Car Course; the Norton 200 at Michigan International Speedway, and the Tony Bettenhausen 200 at the Wisconsin State Fair Park Speedway. He also won the 1980 IndyCar and CRL championships. In 1981 Rutherford returned with the No. 1 Pennzoil Chaparral 2K-Cosworth DFX and won the season-opening Kraco Car Stereos 150 at Phoenix International Raceway. The rest of the season proved to be inconsistent as he dropped to fifth in points. The team also competed in the opening round of the USAC Gold Crown season at the 1981 Indianapolis 500. Rutherford led for three laps early on but fuel pump problems ended the team's day after only 25 laps. By the 1982 IndyCar season the 2K was becoming outdated, with its best result in fourth place at the Miller High Life 150. After four races he ranked 18th in points. By the time of the Norton Michigan 500 at Michigan International Speedway, the team was using a March 82C-Cosworth DFX purchased from Bob Fletcher Racing. Rutherford's results managed to improve as he took his season-best finish of third at the AirCal 500K at Riverside International Raceway. Rutherford ended up in 12th place in points that year. The team also competed at the USAC Gold Crown season finale, the 1982 Indianapolis 500, where Rutherford started 12th and finished 8th.

=== 1990s ===
In the 1991 CART season Hall returned to Indy cars in conjunction with VDS Racing, with the team being called Hall-VDS Racing with John Andretti driving the No. 4 Pennzoil Z-7 Lola T91/00-Ilmor-Chevrolet Indy V8. The team managed to get a victory in their debut, the Gold Coast IndyCar Grand Prix on the Surfers Paradise Street Circuit. The team also got a second-place finish at the Miller Genuine Draft 200 at the Milwaukee Mile. Also, at the 1991 Indianapolis 500 Andretti got a fifth-place finish. At the end of the season Andretti was ranked a career-best eighth in points. In the 1992 CART season Andretti drove the No. 8 Pennzoil Z-7 Lola T92/00-Ilmor-Chevrolet Indy V8 for the team. However, Andretti's best finish came at the Pioneer Electronics 200 at the Mid-Ohio Sports Car Course where he came in fourth place. At the end of the year Andretti finished eighth in points again. He then left the team at the end of the season to compete in the NHRA Winston Drag Racing Series for Jack Clark. So in the 1993 CART season the team fielded Teo Fabi in the No. 8 Pennzoil Lola T93/00-Ilmor-Chevrolet Indy V8. Fabi's best finish was fourth, at the Toyota Grand Prix of Long Beach on his way to an 11th-place finish in points. In the 1994 CART season Fabi drove the No. 11 Pennzoil Reynard 94i-Ilmor D. Fabi's best results that season were a pair of fourth-place finishes at the Marlboro 500 at Michigan International Speedway and the Texaco/Havoline 200 at Road America. Fabi went on to end the season ranked ninth in points. At the end of the season he left to drive for Forsythe Racing. For the 1995 CART season VDS dropped out of the venture and the team became known as Hall Racing and rookie Gil de Ferran was signed on to pilot the No. 8 Pennzoil Reynard 95i-Ilmor-Mercedes-Benz IC108. In four of the first six races de Ferran managed to qualify in the top-10. Although he only scored two points during that time. His season soon turned around starting with a pole position at the Budweiser Grand Prix of Cleveland at Cleveland Burke Lakefront Airport where he was leading with five laps to go when he collided with the lapped car of Scott Pruett taking him out of the race. De Ferran avenged this later in the season when he won the season-ending Toyota Monterey Grand Prix at Laguna Seca Raceway. He finished 14th in points and won the Jim Trueman PPG IndyCar World Series Rookie of the Year Award. For the 1996 IndyCar season he drove the No. 8 Pennzoil Reynard 96i-Honda Indy V8 and qualified for the pole at the 1996 Toyota Grand Prix of Long Beach. He also won the Medic Drug Grand Prix of Cleveland and finished sixth in the final points standings. Despite the recent success Hall closed up the Indy car team for good, after which de Ferran drove for Walker Racing in the 1997 CART season. In total Hall won 13 races and two championships.

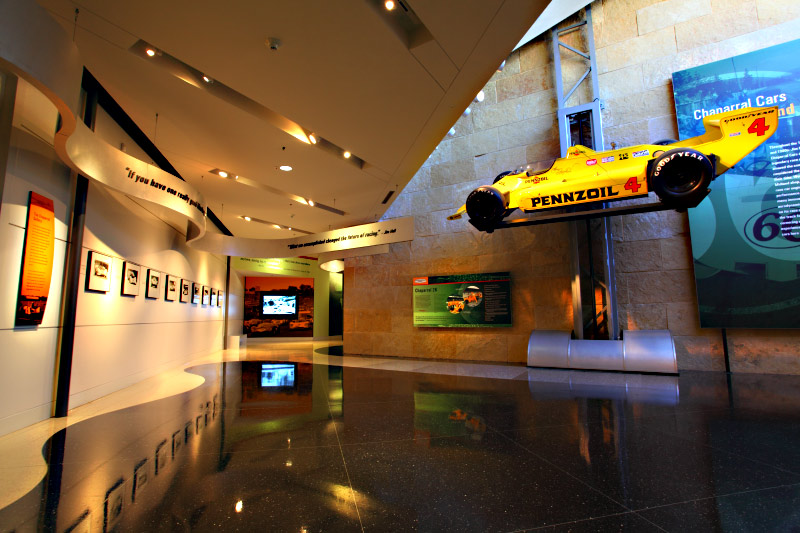
Museum entrance to the Chaparral display

== Museum ==
In 2005, a wing of the Permian Basin Petroleum Museum in Midland, Texas, was dedicated to the permanent display of the remaining Chaparral cars and the history of their development. The cars are driven from time to time at the museum grounds to keep them running properly.

== Tributes ==
- The 2005 Monterey Historic Automobile Races honored Chaparrals as the featured marque. Hall's Chaparral 2A won the Monterey Sports Car Championships at Laguna Seca Raceway in 1964.
- In the 2009 Monterey Sports Car Championships, Gil de Ferran painted his Acura ARX-02a to resemble a Chaparral in tribute to Jim Hall, for whose team he drove in his first two seasons in CART, and also to commemorate his final professional race. An exhibition race featuring the Acura and three Chaparrals was held that Friday with Hall performed a demonstration lap shortly before the race.

== Racecars ==
Year	Car	Category
1958	Chaparral 1	Sports car racing
1963	Chaparral 2A	Sports prototype
1965	Chaparral 2C	Sports prototype
1966	Chaparral 2D	Group 6
1966	Chaparral 2E	Group 7
1967	Chaparral 2F	Group 6
1967	Chaparral 2G	Group 7
1968	Chaparral 2H	Group 7
1970	Chaparral 2J	Group 7
1979	Chaparral 2K	IndyCar

== Complete PPG CART Indycar World Series results ==
(key)

Year	Chassis	Engine	Drivers	No.	1	2	3	4	5	6	7	8	9	10	11	12	13	14	15	16	17	Pos	Pts Pos
Chaparral Cars
1979					PHX	ATL		INDY	TRT		MCH		WGL	TRT	ONT	MCH	ATL	PHX					
1979	Lola T500	Cosworth DFX	(United States) Al Unser	2	4	6	3							6								4th	2,163
1979	Chaparral 2K	Cosworth DFX	(United States) Al Unser	2				22	2	12	13	3	5		5	10	5	1				4th	2,163
1979	Lola T500	Cosworth DFX	(United States) Dennis Firestone (R)	86											31							NC	—
1980					ONT	INDY	MIL	POC	MOH	MCH	WGL	MIL	ONT	MCH	MXC	PHX							
1980	Chaparral 2K	Cosworth DFX	(United States) Johnny Rutherford	4	1	1	2	2	1	1	5	1	2	4	10	13						1st	4,723
1981					PHX	MIL	ATL		MCH	RIV	MIL	MCH	WGL	MXC	PHX								
1981	Chaparral 2K	Cosworth DFX	(United States) Johnny Rutherford	1	1*	6	2*	3	22	21	4	20	2	26	21							5th	120
1982					PHX	ATL	MIL	CLE	MCH	MIL	POC	RIV	ROA	MCH	PHX								
1982	Chaparral 2K	Cosworth DFX	(United States) Johnny Rutherford	5	4		15	23	28	17	12	3	12	DNS	21							12th	62
Hall-VDS Racing
1991					SFR	LBH	PHX	INDY	MIL	DET	POR	CLE	MEA	TOR	MCH	DEN	VAN	MOH	ROA	NAZ	LAG		
1991	Lola T91/00	Chevrolet 265A	(United States) John Andretti	5	1	18	11	5	2	6	19	15	4	5	6	7	7	10	19	9	19	8th	105
1992					SFR	PHX	LBH	INDY	DET	POR	MIL	NHA	TOR	MCH	CLE	ROA	VAN	MOH	NAZ	LAG			
1992	Lola T92/00	Chevrolet 265A	(United States) John Andretti	8	6	6	20	8	21	5	9	5	5	6	12	6	15	4	18	5		8th	94
1992	Lola T92/00	Chevrolet 265A	(Belgium) Didier Theys	38				DNQ														40th	0
1993					SFR	PHX	LBH	INDY	MIL	DET	POR	CLE	TOR	MCH	NHA	ROA	VAN	MOH	NAZ	LAG			
1993	Lola T93/07	Chevrolet 265C	(Italy) Teo Fabi	8	9	5	4	9	9	22	25	8	14	6	16	8	8	24	11	8		11th	64
1994					SFR	PHX	LBH	INDY	MIL	DET	POR	CLE	TOR	MCH	MOH	NHA	VAN	ROA	NAZ	LAG			
1994	Reynard 94i	Ilmor 265D	(Italy) Teo Fabi	11	7	26	9	7	17	4	27	9	8	4	21	20	18	4	6	5		9th	79
Jim Hall Racing
1995					MIA	SFR	PHX	LBH	NAZ	INDY	MIL	DET	POR	ROA	TOR	CLE	MCH	MOH	NHA	VAN	LAG		
1995	Reynard 95i	Mercedes-Benz IC108B	(Brazil) Gil de Ferran (R)	8	25	16	11	27	19	29	8	16	10	21	16	14*	12	24	7	2	1*	14th	56
1996					MIA	RIO	SFR	LBH	NAZ	500	MIL	DET	POR	CLE	TOR	MCH	MOH	ROA	VAN	LAG			
1996	Reynard 96i	Honda HRH V8t	(Brazil) Gil de Ferran	8	2	10	11	5*	23	9	9	3	2	1*	18	19	17	25	4	25		6th	104

== Jim Hall Racing - IndyCar wins ==
#	Season	Date	Sanction	Track / Race	No.	Winning driver	Chassis	Engine	Tire	Grid	Laps Led
1	1978	May 28	USAC	Indianapolis 500 (O)	2	(United States) Al Unser	Lola T500	Cosworth DFX V8t	Goodyear	5	121
2	1978	June 25	USAC	Pocono 500 (O)	2	(United States) Al Unser (2)	Lola T500	Cosworth DFX V8t	Goodyear	10	65
3	1978	September 3	USAC	Ontario 500 (O)	2	(United States) Al Unser (3)	Lola T500	Cosworth DFX V8t	Goodyear	7	74
4	1979	October 20	CART	Phoenix International Raceway (O)	2	(United States) Al Unser (4)	Chaparral 2K	Cosworth DFX V8t	Goodyear	2	138
5	1980	April 13	CART	Ontario (O)	4	(United States) Johnny Rutherford	Chaparral 2K	Cosworth DFX V8t	Goodyear	Pole	74
6	1980	May 25	USAC	Indianapolis 500 (O)	4	(United States) Johnny Rutherford (2)	Chaparral 2K	Cosworth DFX V8t	Goodyear	Pole	118
7	1980	July 13	CART	Mid-Ohio Sports Car Course (R)	4	(United States) Johnny Rutherford (3)	Chaparral 2K	Cosworth DFX V8t	Goodyear	4	19
8	1980	July 20	CART	Michigan (O)	4	(United States) Johnny Rutherford (4)	Chaparral 2K	Cosworth DFX V8t	Goodyear	2	62
9	1980	August 10	CART	Milwaukee Mile (O)	4	(United States) Johnny Rutherford (5)	Chaparral 2K	Cosworth DFX V8t	Goodyear	Pole	63
10	1981	March 22	CART	Phoenix International Raceway (O)	1	(United States) Johnny Rutherford (6)	Chaparral 2K	Cosworth DFX V8t	Goodyear	3	68
11	1991	March 17	CART	Gold Coast Indy 300 (S)	4	(United States) John Andretti	Lola T91/00	Chevrolet 265A V8t	Goodyear	9	4
12	1995	September 10	CART	Laguna Seca Raceway (R)	8	(Brazil) Gil de Ferran (R)	Reynard 95i	Mercedes-Benz IC108B V8t	Goodyear	3	54
13	1996	June 30	CART	Grand Prix of Cleveland (S)	8	(Brazil) Gil de Ferran (2)	Reynard 96i	Honda HRH V8t	Goodyear	7	34

== Bibliography ==
- Falconer, Richard; Nye, Doug (September 1, 1992). Chaparral: Complete History of Jim Hall's Chaparral Race Cars 1961–1970. Motorbooks International. ISBN 978-0879386078.
- Friedman, Dave (October 1, 2005). Chaparral: Can-Am & Prototype Race Cars. Motorbooks. ISBN 978-0760322505.
- Robert Weber (September 2015). Automobilsport Racing / History / Passion #05: Jim Hall & Chaparral. Sportfahrer Verlag. ISSN 2199-126X.
