= Chaparral 2E =

Group 7 racing car by Chaparral

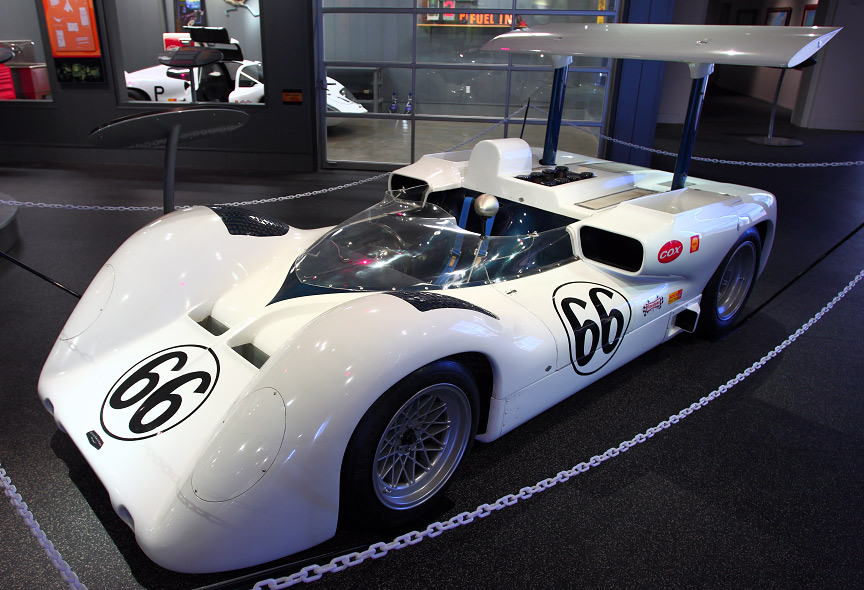
- Category: Group 7
- Constructor: Chaparral Cars
- Designers: Jim Hall; Hap Sharp
- Production: 1965

Technical specifications
- Chassis: Reinforced aluminum alloy monocoque, fiberglass body
- Suspension (front): unequal-length double wishbones, coil springs over tubular shock absorbers, anti-roll bar, anti-dive geometry
- Suspension (rear): unequal-length reversed lower wishbones, single top links, twin trailing arms, coil springs over shock absorbers, anti-roll bar, anti-dive/squat geometry
- Length: 158 in (4,000 mm)
- Width: 64 in (1,600 mm)
- Height: 27 in (690 mm)
- Axle track: 53.5 in (1,360 mm) (front); 52 in (1,300 mm) (rear)
- Wheelbase: 90 in (2,300 mm)
- Engine: Chevrolet 327 cu in (5,359 cc) all-aluminum small-block OHV V8 naturally aspirated mid-engined, longitudinally mounted
- Transmission: Chaparral 2-speed automatic
- Power: 450–475 hp (336–354 kW) @ 6,800 rpm
- Weight: 1,550–1,560 lb (700–710 kg)
- Brakes: Solid discs
- Tires: Firestone; Chaparral cast-alloy one-piece center-locking 16 in wheels

Competition history
- Notable entrants: (United States) Chaparral Cars Inc.
- Debut: 1966 Player's 200
Races	Wins	Podiums	Poles	F/Laps
18	1	4	0	0

The Chaparral 2E is a Group 7 sports prototype race car designed and developed by both Jim Hall and Hap Sharp, and built by American manufacturer Chaparral, which campaigned in the Can-Am Championship series, in 1966.
