= Hap Sharp =

American racing driver (1928–1993)

- Born: January 1, 1928; Tulsa, Oklahoma, United States
- Died: May 7, 1993 (aged 65); San Martín de los Andes, Argentina

Formula One World Championship career
- Nationality: (United States) American
- Active years: 1961–1964
- Team(s): private Cooper, non-works Lotus and Brabham
- Entries: 6
- Championships: 0
- Wins: 0
- Podiums: 0
- Career points: 0
- Pole positions: 0
- Fastest laps: 0
- First entry: 1961 United States Grand Prix
- Last entry: 1964 Mexican Grand Prix

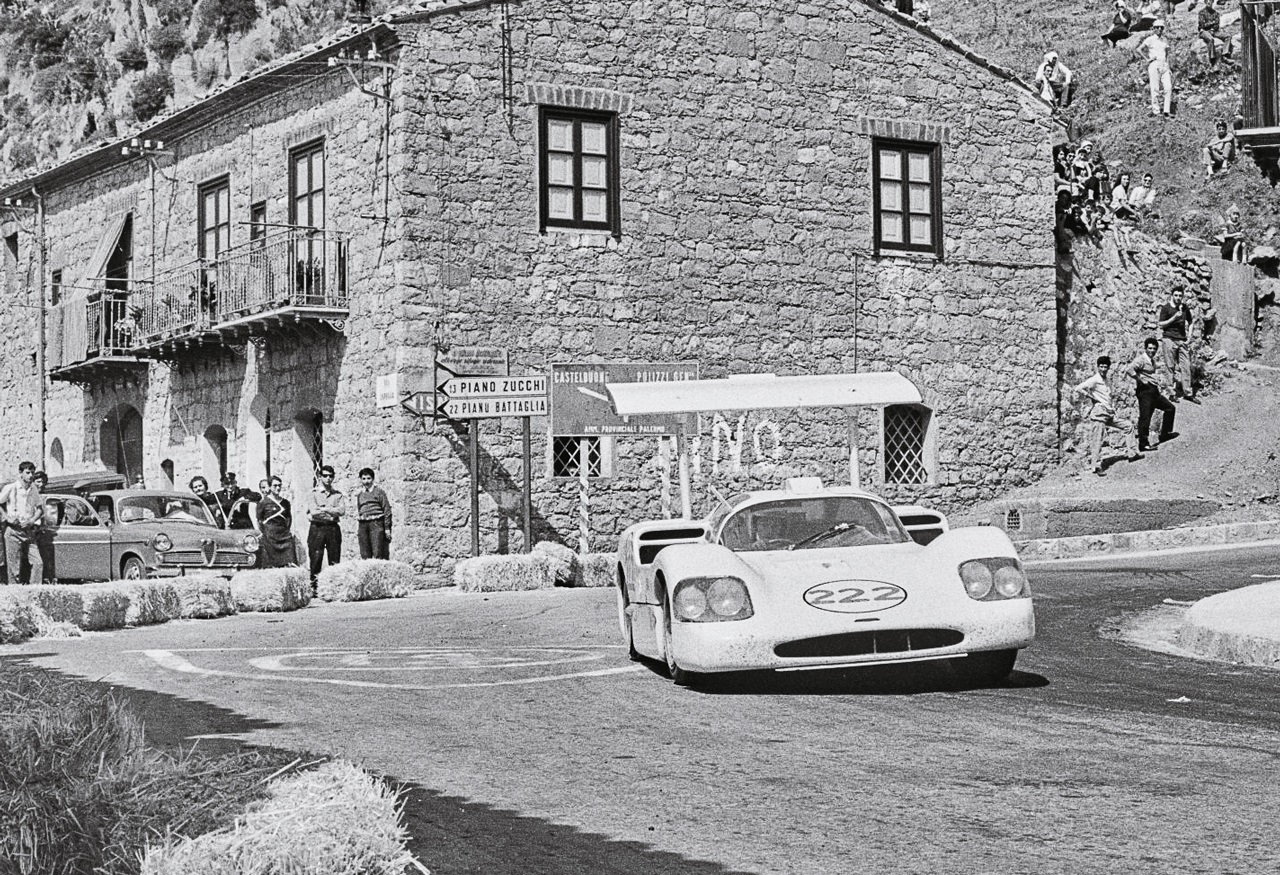
The Chaparral 2F Sharp shared with Phil Hill at the 1967 Targa Florio

James "Hap" Sharp (January 1, 1928 – May 7, 1993) was an American race car driver who drove in six Formula One Grands Prix. He was most famous however, for being a co-owner and driver of the revolutionary Chaparral sports racing cars built by Jim Hall and Sharp in Midland, Texas. In 1962, Sharp and Jim Hall formed Chaparral Cars, Inc. and immediately began the design and construction of Chaparral 2, a mid-engined car with an aerospace inspired semi-monocoque fiberglass chassis.

== Racing career ==
Sharp's record while driving for Chaparral:

=== 1962 ===
- Road America 500, Hall and Sharp 1st - Chaparral 1

=== 1964 ===
- USRRC Kent, Sharp 2nd - Chaparral 2
- USRRC Greenwood, Sharp fastest lap - Chaparral 2
- USRRC Mid-Ohio, Sharp 1st - Chaparral 2
- Nassau Speed Week, Sharp/Penske 1st - Chaparral 2

=== 1965 ===
- Sebring, Hall/Sharp fastest lap and 1st - Chaparral 2
- USRRC Riverside, Sharp fastest lap and 2nd - Chaparral 2
- Bridgehampton, Sharp 2nd - Chaparral 2
- USRRC Watkins Glen, Sharp 2nd - Chaparral 2
- FIA Mt. Tremblant, Canada, Sharp 3rd - Chaparral 2
- USRRC Kent, Sharp fastest lap and 2nd - Chaparral 2
- USRRC Continental Divide, CO, Sharp 1st - Chaparral 2
- USRRC Mid-Ohio, Sharp 1st - Chaparral 2
- Road America 500 Hall/Sharp/Hissom 1st, Hall/Sharp/Jennigs 2nd - Chaparral 2
- Bridgehampton, Sharp fastest lap and 1st - Chaparral 2
- Kent WA, Sharp 2nd - Chaparral 2C
- Laguna Seca, Sharp fastest lap and 2nd - Chaparral 2
- Riverside, Sharp 1st - Chaparral 2
- Las Vegas, Sharp 1st - Chaparral 2
- Nassau, Sharp 1st - Chaparral 2 (fitted with two position flipper type spoiler per the Chaparral 2C)

Sharp retired from driving after the 1965 season, with two exceptions. Sharp drove a Chaparral 2E in the 1966 Nassau Trophy race, and substituted for Mike Spence (F1 commitment) driving the Chaparral 2F in the 1967 Targa Florio.

== Personal life ==
Sharp's nickname "Hap" came from "Happy New Year", in connection with his date of birth. He committed suicide in 1993 after being diagnosed with cancer.

== Complete Formula One World Championship results ==
(key)

| Year | Entrant | Chassis | Engine | 1 | 2 | 3 | 4 | 5 | 6 | 7 | 8 | 9 | 10 | WDC | Points |
|---|---|---|---|---|---|---|---|---|---|---|---|---|---|---|---|
| 1961 | 'Hap' Sharp | Cooper T53 | Climax Straight-4 | MON | NED | BEL | FRA | GBR | GER | ITA | USA; 10 | | | NC | 0 |
| 1962 | 'Hap' Sharp | Cooper T53 | Climax Straight-4 | NED | MON | BEL | FRA | GBR | GER | ITA | USA; 11 | RSA | | NC | 0 |
| 1963 | Reg Parnell Racing | Lotus 24 | BRM V8 | MON | BEL | NED | FRA | GBR | GER | ITA | USA; Ret | MEX; 7 | RSA | NC | 0 |
| 1964 | Rob Walker Racing Team | Brabham BT11 | BRM V8 | MON | NED | BEL | FRA | GBR | GER | AUT | ITA | USA; NC | MEX; 13 | NC | 0 |
