= 1961 Canadian Grand Prix =

1961 Canadian sports car race held in Bowmanville, Ontario

Race details
- Date: September 30, 1961
- Location: Mosport Park, Bowmanville, Ontario, Canada
- Course: Permanent racing facility
- Course length: 3.957 km (2.459 miles)
- Distance: 100 laps, 395.7 km (245.9 miles)
- Weather: Warm with temperatures approaching 26.7 °C (80.1 °F); wind speeds up to 15 kilometres per hour (9.3 mph)

Pole position
Driver	(United Kingdom) Stirling Moss	Lotus-Climax
- Time: 1:35.7

Fastest lap
Driver	(United Kingdom) Stirling Moss	Lotus-Climax
- Time: 1:34.2

Podium
First	(Canada) Peter Ryan	Lotus-Climax
Second	(Mexico) Pedro Rodríguez	Ferrari
Third	(United Kingdom) Stirling Moss	Lotus-Climax

The 1961 Canadian Grand Prix was a motor race held at Mosport Park on September 30, 1961, held for sports cars eligible for the Canadian Sports Car Championship regulations. 26 cars started the race. It was the first time a motor race had carried the name Canadian Grand Prix, which in future years would become an event on the Formula One world championship. The race was won by Canadian driver Peter Ryan driving a Lotus 19. Ryan finished a lap ahead of Mexican racer Pedro Rodríguez driving a North American Racing Team-run Ferrari 250 TR with pole sitter Stirling Moss third in another Lotus 19 run by his Formula One team, UDT Laystall Racing.

== Results ==
Class winners in bold.

Pos	Class	No	Driver	Car	Team	Laps	Time/Retired	Grid
1	**+2.0**	**52**	(Canada) **Peter Ryan**	**Lotus 19-Climax**	**Comstock Racing Team**	**100**	**2:46:44**	**3**
2	+2.0	2	(Mexico) Pedro Rodríguez	Ferrari 250 TRI/61	North American Racing Team	99	− 1 lap	4
3	+2.0	7	(United Kingdom) Stirling Moss	Lotus 19-Climax	UDT Laystall Racing	99	− 1 lap	1
4	+2.0	20	(United States) George Constantine	Ferrari 250 TR	North American Racing Team	99	− 1 lap	5
5	**2.0**	**39**	(Canada) **Ludwig Heimrath**	**Porsche 718 RS 60**	**Eglinton & Caledonia Motors Ltd.**	**97**	**− 3 laps**	**7**
6	2.0	3	(United States) John Fulp	Ferrari Dino 196 S	North American Racing Team	96	− 4 laps	16
7	2.0	25	(Canada) Francis Bradley	Lola Mk 1-Climax	R. M. Hollingshead Corp. of Canada Ltd.	92	− 8 laps	12
8	2.0	86	(United States) Herb Swan	Porsche 718 RS 61	Herb Swan	92	− 8 laps	11
9	2.0	8	(Canada) Fred Hayes	Osca S1000	North American Racing Team	88	− 12 laps	19
10	2.0	131	(Canada) Brent Morris	Lotus Mark IX-Climax	Brent Morris	88	− 12 laps	18
11	+2.0	72	(Canada) Oliver Clubine	Torus-Triumph	Manshaw Motors	84	− 16 laps	
12 DNF	+2.0	6	(Belgium) Olivier Gendebien	Lotus 19-Climax	UDT Laystall Racing	82	Transmission	2
13	+2.0	169	(Canada) Nat Adams	Jaguar XKSS	Tidewater Oil Co. of Canada	80	− 20 laps	15
14	+2.0	4	(United States) Wayne Burnett	Ferrari 250 TR	Wayne Burnett	80	− 20 laps	
15 DNF	+2.0	13	(United States) Bob Clift	Chevrolet Special	Laura Nelson Clift	70	Retired	9
16 DNF	+2.0	1	(Mexico) Ricardo Rodríguez	Ferrari Dino 246 S	North American Racing Team	48	Oil pressure	6
17 DNF	+2.0	11	(United States) Bob Hurt	Ferrari 250 TR	Robert Kert	34	Retired	14
18 DNF	2.0	140	(Canada) G. D. Cockerill	Triumph Special	Motorsport Club of Ottawa	25	Retired	20
19 DNF	+2.0	51	(Canada) Dan Shaw	Sadler Mk.V-Chevrolet	Comstock Racing Team	20	Transmission	
20 DNF	2.0	75	(United States) Ray Heppenstall	Osca 2000		12	Retired	
21 DNF	2.0	49	(Canada) Jim Muzzin	Porsche 550 RS	Downtown Porsche	7	Engine	
22 DNF	2.0	5	(Canada) Dennis Coad	Lotus Mark IX-Climax	Herb Swan	6	Retired	
23 DNF	2.0	14	(United States) Bob Holbert	Porsche 718 RS 61	Holbert's Garage	0	Accident	8
24 DNF	+2.0	10	(Canada) George Makins	Makins Special-Chevrolet	Makins Auto Body	0	Front axle	17
DSQ	+2.0	63	(United States) George Reed	Ferrari 250 TR 59/60	North American Racing Team	96	Pit violation	10
DSQ	2.0	132	(United States) Harry Entwistle	Lotus 15-Climax	Gulliver Motor Ltd.	94	Pit violation	13

Preceded by None	Canadian Grand Prix; 1961	Succeeded by 1962 Canadian Grand Prix
