= Canadian Grand Prix =

Formula One Grand Prix

- Circuit Gilles Villeneuve

Race information
- Number of times held: 61
- First held: 1961
- Most wins (drivers): (Germany) Michael Schumacher (United Kingdom) Lewis Hamilton (7)
- Most wins (constructors): (Italy) Ferrari (14)
- Circuit length: 4.361 km (2.709 miles)
- Race length: 305.270 km (189.694 miles)
- Laps: 70

Last race (2026)

Pole position
- (United Kingdom) George Russell; Mercedes; 1:12.578

Podium
- 1. (Italy) K. Antonelli; Mercedes; 1:28:15.758; 2. (United Kingdom) L. Hamilton; Ferrari; +10.768; 3. (Netherlands) M. Verstappen; Red Bull Racing-Red Bull Ford; +11.276

Fastest lap
- (Italy) Kimi Antonelli; Mercedes; 1:14.210

The Canadian Grand Prix (French: Grand Prix du Canada) is an annual motor racing event held since 1961. It has been part of the Formula One World Championship since 1967. It was first staged at Mosport Park in Bowmanville, Ontario, as a sports car event, before alternating between Mosport and Circuit Mont-Tremblant, Quebec, after Formula One took over the event. After 1971, safety concerns led to the Grand Prix moving permanently to Mosport. In 1978, after similar safety concerns with Mosport, the Canadian Grand Prix moved to its current home at Circuit Gilles Villeneuve on Notre Dame Island in Montreal, Quebec.

In 2005, the Canadian Grand Prix was the most watched Formula One Grand Prix in the world. The race was also the third most watched sporting event worldwide, behind the first place Super Bowl XXXIX and that year's UEFA Champions League final.

The 2020 and 2021 events were cancelled due to the COVID-19 pandemic. The Canadian Grand Prix returned to the calendar in the 2022 season. In 2025 the contract for the race was extended until 2035.

== History ==
The early Canadian Grand Prix was one of the premier events of the new Canadian Sports Car Championship, a series which had been created alongside the Canadian Grand Prix at Mosport Park near Toronto in 1961. Mosport Park (which is still in its original layout configuration) was a spectacular and challenging circuit which had many ups and downs; the circuit was popular with drivers. Several international sports car as well as Formula One drivers participated in the event. For the first five years, the event would be won by drivers with either prior Formula One experience, or would enter the championship after winning the Canadian Grand Prix. In 1966 the Canadian-American Challenge Cup ran the event, with American Mark Donohue winning. Formula One took over the following year, although the CSCC and Can-Am series continued to compete at Mosport in their own events.

=== Formula One ===
==== Mosport Park and Mont-Tremblant (1967–74, 1976–77) ====
The event was run as part of the Formula One world championship first in 1967; Mosport Park was selected as the venue for the event. The Ontario circuit alternated with the Circuit Mont-Tremblant in Quebec, where the Canadian Grand Prix was held in 1968 and 1970. Mont-Tremblant, located 1 1/2 hours northwest of Montreal, was much like Mosport Park in that it was a spectacular circuit which had significant elevation change and was very challenging. The first championship race was held between the German and Italian rounds on 27 August; it was won by Jack Brabham with his New Zealander teammate Denny Hulme completing a Brabham 1–2.

The 1968 event, which was moved to late September so it could be paired with the United States Grand Prix at Watkins Glen, saw the unlucky New Zealander Chris Amon lead from the start until 17 laps from the end of the 90 lap distance when his gearbox broke; the McLaren team finished 1–2 with Amon's countrymen Hulme and Bruce McLaren taking top honours.

Following the 1968 season, a group led by John Bassett and race sponsor Imperial Tobacco developed a proposal to move both the Grand Prix and Mosport's Telegram Trophy IndyCar race to a new street circuit in Toronto along Lake Shore Boulevard and through Exhibition Place with the start/finish line and pits to be located inside Exhibition Stadium. Bassett dropped the idea just as the bill was going through third reading before Toronto city council. The idea to move the race to an urban location would return a decade later.

The 1969 event at Mosport Park saw Briton Jackie Stewart climb up from 4th to take the lead, but Jacky Ickx was coming up fast, and Stewart and Ickx battled until lap 33, when they came to lap privateer Al Pease for the fourth time, Ickx attempted to pass Stewart, and the two cars collided. Stewart was unable to get his Matra going, but Ickx did get his Brabham going, and held onto the lead until the checkered flag. An angry Stewart complained to his boss Ken Tyrrell about Pease, who complained to the organizers. The 48-year-old Pease was then given the black disqualification flag after completing less than half the number of laps the leaders had completed in an almost embarrassingly outdated Eagle-Climax, and became the only driver in F1 history ever to be disqualified for being too slow. The 1970 event saw Ickx win again with his Swiss teammate Clay Regazzoni making the result a Ferrari 1–2. But the Mont-Tremblant circuit was not used again for Formula One because of safety concerns regarding the bitter winters seriously affecting the track surface and a dispute with the local racing authorities there in 1972. The alternating of the race stopped and Mosport solely continued to hold the Canadian Grand Prix from 1971.

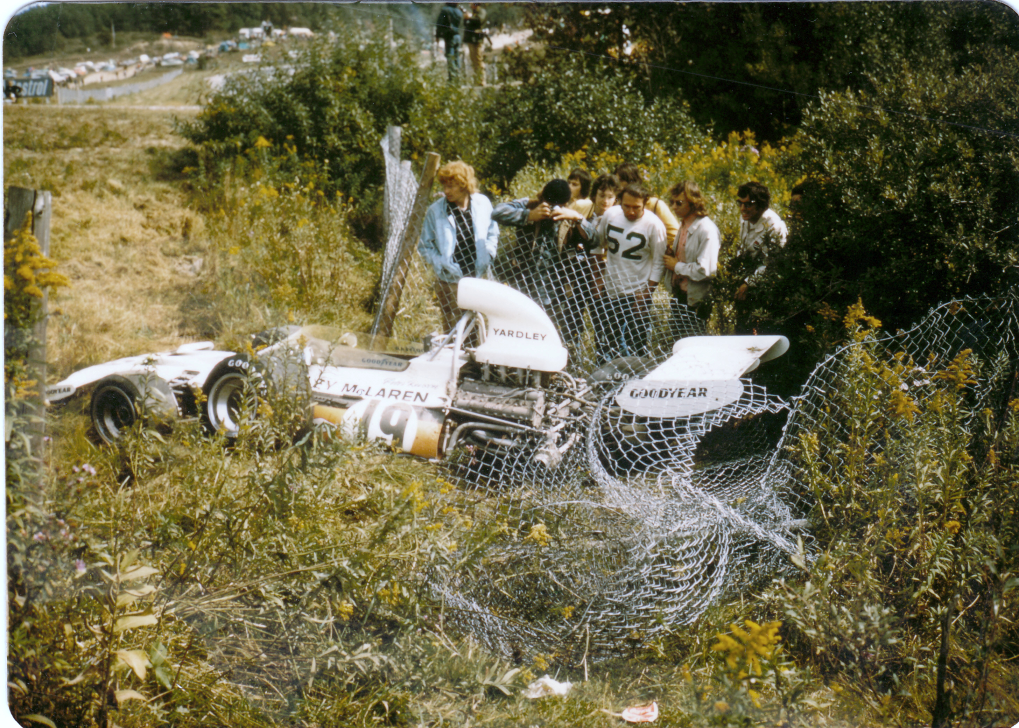
Peter Revson's crashed McLaren M19C. The crash occurred the lap after he set the pole position lap for the 1972 Canadian Grand Prix.

The 1971 event saw Mosport Park flooded with rain and fog; the main event was delayed after a fatal accident at a Formula Ford support race and by the time it started, it was raining heavily. Jackie Stewart took victory easily in a Tyrrell from Swede Ronnie Peterson in a March. 1972 saw Mosport upgraded with new safety features, and Stewart won again. 1973 was an interesting event; like the race 2 years previous it was a rain-soaked event. Austrian new-boy Niki Lauda in a BRM took the lead from Peterson in a Lotus on Lap 3, Lauda led until the 20th lap when he came to change tires; there was considerable confusion after François Cevert and Jody Scheckter collided on Lap 33 leading to a bungled pace car interlude after which things became very confused as the pace car failed to pick up the leader and allowed those ahead to gain almost a lap. All this meant that Briton Jackie Oliver ended up in the lead with American Peter Revson second and Frenchman Jean-Pierre Beltoise third. Of these three Revson had the most competitive car and so eventually moved into the lead and led all the way to the flag while Peterson's Brazilian teammate Emerson Fittipaldi charged to try to make up for lost ground and overtook Oliver and Beltoise in the closing laps to grab second. For hours after the race confusion reigned but eventually it was confirmed that Revson was the winner- thanks to a lucky break when the pace car came out. The 1974 event saw Fittipaldi win while his championship rivals Clay Regazzoni finished 2nd and Jody Scheckter crashed heavily after a brake failure on his Tyrrell. There was no 1975 event, and the 1976 event was one where Briton James Hunt found out that his 9 points from Brands Hatch were taken away and he was disqualified; Hunt won the Canadian Grand Prix event that year, driving furiously throughout the race.

1977 was the race where French-Canadian Gilles Villeneuve made his debut for Ferrari. But concerns about the bumpy Mosport Park's safety arose when Briton Ian Ashley had a horrendous accident while cresting a bumpy rise. Ashley's Hesketh flipped over the Armco guardrails and went into a television tower. The German-born Englishman was seriously injured and safety operations to rescue him were inefficient and time-consuming; and the lack of safety at Mosport was underlined when Jochen Mass lost control of his McLaren and hit a guardrail that virtually flattened upon impact. Jody Scheckter won this race in his Wolf, but with continuing safety concerns, a new proposal was brought forward. Labatt, the sponsor who held the rights to F1 racing in Canada at the time, as well as the owners of Mosport Park revived the 1968 proposal to move the race to Toronto's Exhibition Place after the FIA deemed Mosport as an unsuitable host facility going forward. Toronto city council turned down the proposal by a margin of two votes and within a few hours, Montreal mayor Jean Drapeau had negotiated with Labatt to move the race permanently to Montreal. A third attempt at a Toronto race eventually came to fruition by competing Canadian brewer Molson in 1986 as the Molson Indy Toronto, part of the Indy Car World Series The original plan was to alternate between Montreal and Toronto, but Montreal became the permament venue.

A plan was quickly put together to develop a track called the Circuit Île Notre Dame on a man-made island in the middle of the St. Lawrence seaway that had been the site of the famous Expo '67; specific roads on the island were combined and modified, and then pit facilities were built to make a temporary race track. The Canadian Grand Prix was first held there in 1978 and it has been held there ever since, with the exception of four years when the event was cancelled.

==== Montreal (1978–86, 1988–2008, 2010–2019, 2022–present) ====
The first winner in Montreal was Quebec native Villeneuve, driving a Ferrari. 1979 saw circuit layout modifications to make it faster, and Australian Alan Jones win, and he then won the 1980 race and the Drivers' Championship that year. 1980 also saw a big startline pile-up with involved Jones's Brazilian championship rival Nelson Piquet after he and Jones collided going into the very fast Droit du Casino corner. Piquet jumped into his spare car with a more powerful qualifying engine; but the engine blew up and Piquet retired from the race. Frenchman Jean-Pierre Jabouille's season and F1 racing career came to an end when he crashed his Renault head-on into a tire wall. He had badly broken legs; it took the tall Frenchman months to recover. 1981 saw a rain-soaked event in which near the end of the race, Villeneuve demonstrated his car control skills when the front wing of his Ferrari was askew from a crash and he drove on to third place with the car in this condition. Frenchman Jacques Laffite took what was to be his last F1 victory, followed by Briton John Watson and Villeneuve.

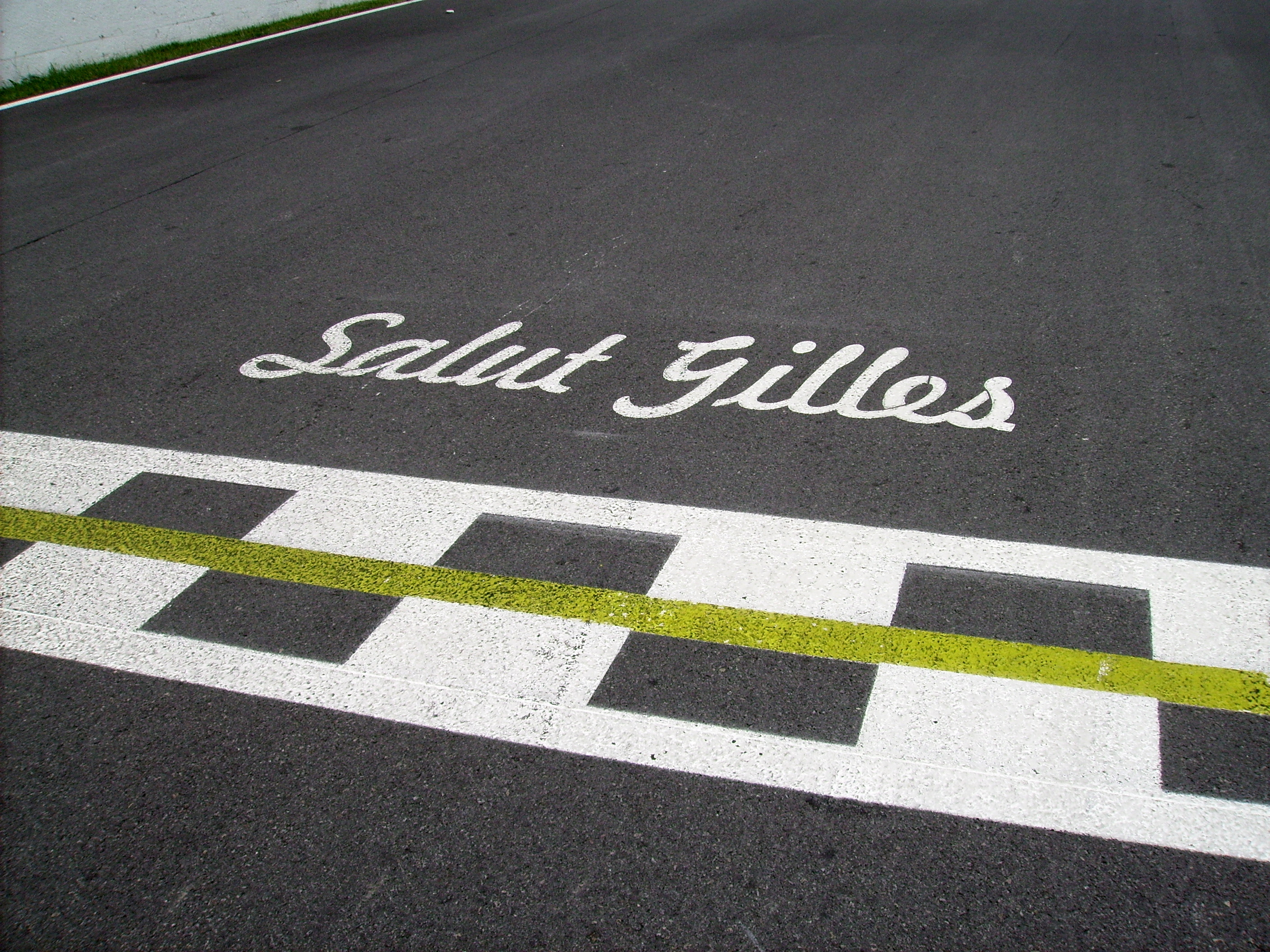
Salut Gilles on the track of Circuit Gilles Villeneuve. The Quebec-born Gilles Villeneuve won the 1978 Canadian Grand Prix.

Villeneuve was killed in 1982 on his final qualifying lap for the Belgian Grand Prix. A few weeks after his death, the race course in Montreal was renamed Circuit Gilles Villeneuve after him. Gilles Villeneuve was one of the first people inducted into the Canadian Motorsport Hall of Fame, and is so far the only Canadian winner of the Formula One Canadian Grand Prix. The 1982 Canadian Grand Prix was a tragic event, in the shadow of the death of Villeneuve a month earlier. It saw another accident when Villeneuve's teammate Didier Pironi stalled at the front of the grid. First, Raul Boesel struck a glancing blow to the stationary vehicle, and then Riccardo Paletti crashed directly into the rear of Pironi's Ferrari at over 180 km/h (110 mph). Pironi and F1 doctor Sid Watkins came to Paletti's aid to try to extract him from his car, which briefly caught fire. After a half-hour, the 23-year-old Paletti was extracted and flown to a nearby hospital, where he succumbed to his injuries. Nelson Piquet won the race in his Brabham. 1982 was also significant in that the race was moved from October to June with the event happening in early June ever since.

In 1983, Frenchman René Arnoux scored his first race win as a Ferrari driver, and the following year Piquet won again in a BMW-powered Brabham. 1985 saw Ferrari finish 1–2 with Italian Michele Alboreto and Swede Stefan Johansson taking top honours from Frenchman Alain Prost, while Lotus gained their final ever lock-out of the front row when Elio de Angelis and Ayrton Senna started 1–2. 1986 was a competitive race. Finn Keke Rosberg in a McLaren charged through the field, caught and then passed British leader Nigel Mansell. But Rosberg, like the other front runners, encountered problems, benefiting Mansell who won the race. In 1987, the race was not held due to a sponsorship dispute between two local breweries, Labatt and Molson. During the break the track was modified, and starting line moved to its current position.

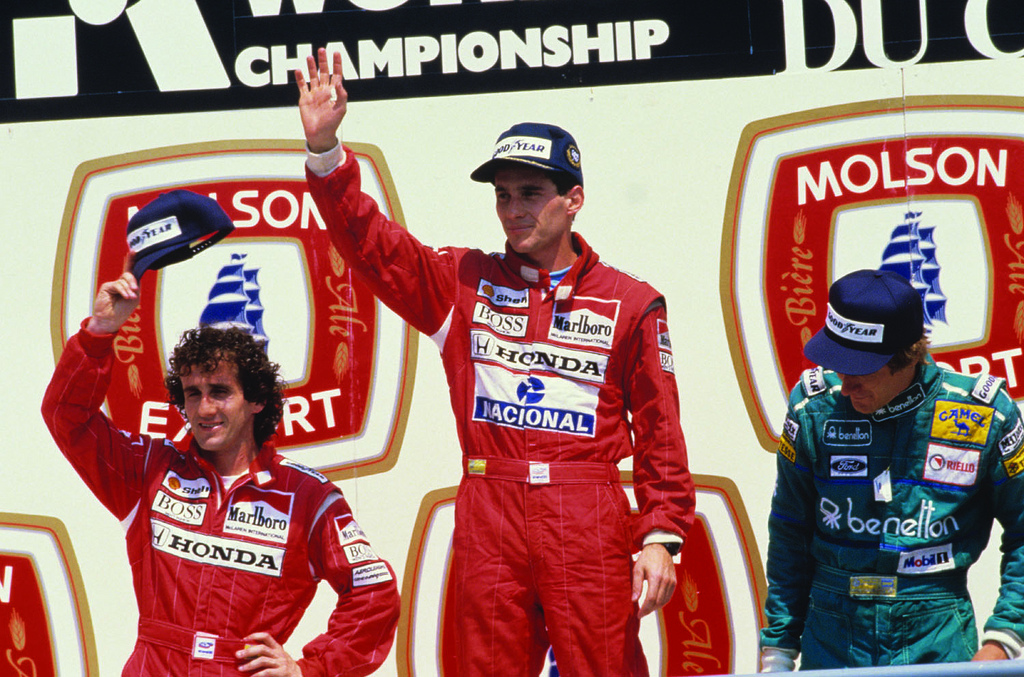
Ayrton Senna celebrates his victory at the 1988 Canadian Grand Prix with Alain Prost and Thierry Boutsen.

1988 saw Brazilian Ayrton Senna take victory in the all-conquering McLaren MP4/4 with its Honda turbo engine, and the following year he so very nearly won again, but the Honda engine in his McLaren failed and Belgian Thierry Boutsen took victory, which was the first in his F1 career. 1990, like the year before, was a rain-soaked event, and it saw a number of accidents; Senna came out to win again. 1991 saw a dramatic finale in which Nigel Mansell's Williams failed on the very last lap only a few corners from the finish line; Nelson Piquet took his 23rd and final F1 victory in a Benetton. Austrian Gerhard Berger won the 1992 event after the dominant Mansell spun off after a collision with Berger's teammate Senna.

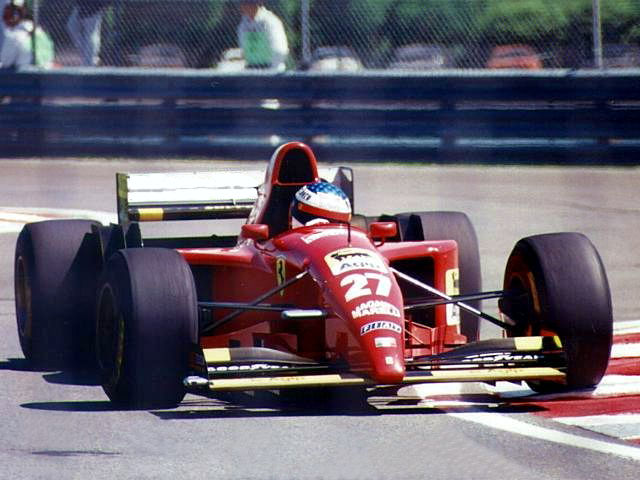
Jean Alesi at the 1995 Canadian Grand Prix

Alain Prost won the 1993 event while fending off a spirited drive from Senna, and in response to the Imola tragedies, the 1994 event saw the very fast Droit du Casino curve being turned into a chicane. German Michael Schumacher won this event. Ferrari's Jean Alesi won the 1995 edition, which occurred on his 31st birthday and which would be the only win of his career. Alesi had inherited the lead when Michael Schumacher pitted with electrical problems and Damon Hill's hydraulics failed. The victory was a popular one for Alesi, particularly after several unrewarded drives the year before, namely in Italy. Alesi's win at Montreal was voted the most popular race victory of the season by many, as it was the number 27 Ferrari—once belonging to the famous Gilles Villeneuve at his much loved home Grand Prix. Schumacher gave Alesi a lift back to the pits after Alesi's car ran out of fuel just before the Pits Hairpin.

The Canadian Grand Prix race had grown in importance around this time; the demise of Grands Prix in Detroit, Phoenix and Mexico City meant that it had been the only North American Grand Prix round since 1993 and would continue to be the only round in North America up until 2000, and again from 2008 to 2011 after yet another demise of the United States Grand Prix, this time at Indianapolis. It was also one of two races in the entire Americas, the other being the Brazilian Grand Prix, although the Argentine Grand Prix had returned for 4 brief years from 1995 to 1998.

The 1996 race saw the Casino corner removed and the layout changed; the run from the hairpin at the bottom of the circuit was turned into a straight. Briton Damon Hill won this event, and the 1997 race was stopped early due to a crash involving Olivier Panis. He was sidelined for nine races and some see it as a turning point in the career of the 1996 Monaco Grand Prix winner. The races from 1997 to 2004 (except 1999 and 2001) saw a romp of Michael Schumacher victories, all in a Ferrari. 1999 saw Finn Mika Häkkinen win, and in 2001, there was the first sibling 1–2 finish in the history of Formula 1, as Ralf and Michael Schumacher topped the podium. The Schumacher brothers would finish 1–2 in the 2003 edition as well, 2001 was also noted for Jean Alesi achieving Prost's best finish of the season; he celebrated his fifth place by doing several donuts in his vehicle, and throwing his helmet into the crowd.

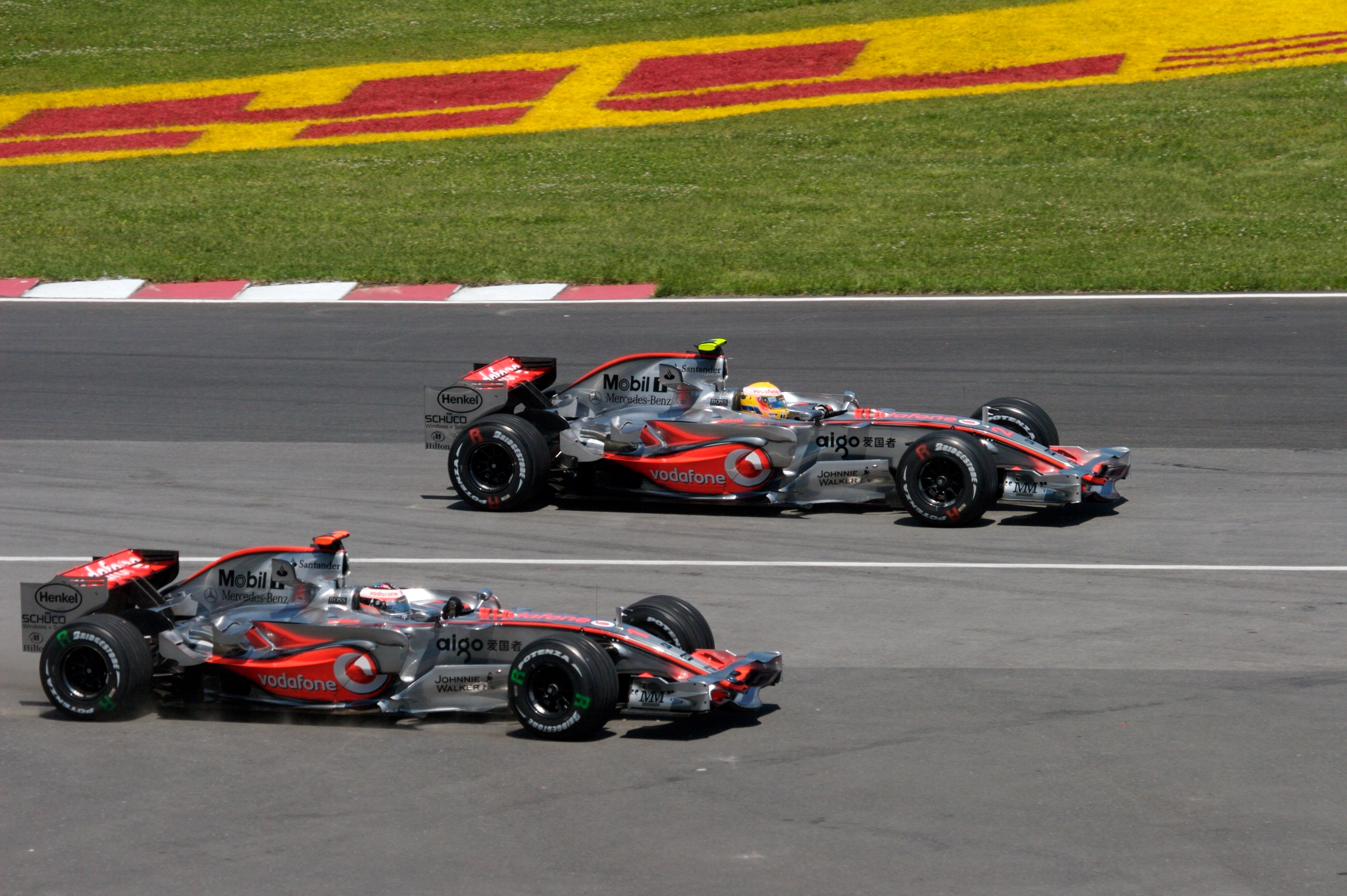
Lewis Hamilton and Fernando Alonso during the 2007 Canadian Grand Prix

The 2007 race was the site of rookie Lewis Hamilton's first win. On lap 67, Takuma Sato overtook McLaren-Mercedes's Fernando Alonso, to cheers around the circuit, just after overtaking Ralf Schumacher and having overtaken Ferrari's Kimi Räikkönen earlier in the race. The race saw Sato move from the middle of the grid to the back of the pack and to a high of fifth before a pit-stop error caused him to move back to eleventh. Sato fought up 5 places in the field in the last 15 laps to finish sixth. Sato was voted "Driver of the Day" on the ITV website over Lewis Hamilton's first win. The race also saw an atrocious crash involving Robert Kubica (who went on to win the race the following season, resulting to be his only one in F1).

===== 2009 hiatus =====
On 7 October 2008, the Canadian Grand Prix was dropped from the 2009 Formula One calendar, which left the Montreal race off the list for the first time since 1987. Since the United States Grand Prix was dropped after 2007, this meant that in 2009 no Formula One race was held in North America for the first time since 1958 (the American Indianapolis 500 formed part of the FIA World Drivers' Championship from 1950 to 1960, but was not run to Formula One regulations and only very rarely entered by regular championship competitors).

During the Australian Grand Prix, reports surfaced that the Canadian Grand Prix could return during the 2009 season in the event that the race circuit in Abu Dhabi was not ready in time. On 26 April 2009, Speed reported Bernie Ecclestone as saying the FIA was negotiating a return of the Canadian Grand Prix for the 2010 season, provided upgrades to the circuit were completed.

On 29 August 2009, the BBC reported the provisional schedule for the 2010 season, which had both the Canadian and British Grand Prix marked down as "provisional". The Canadian GP was originally scheduled for 6 June. The 2010 Canadian Grand Prix was eventually run in Montreal on 13 June 2010. On 27 November 2009, Quebec's officials and Canadian Grand Prix organizers announced they had reached a settlement with Formula One Administration and signed a new five-year contract spanning the 2010–2014 seasons. Under the five-year agreement, the government pays 15 million Canadian dollars a year to host the race, much less than the 35 million a year Ecclestone initially asked for.

===== 2010–present =====
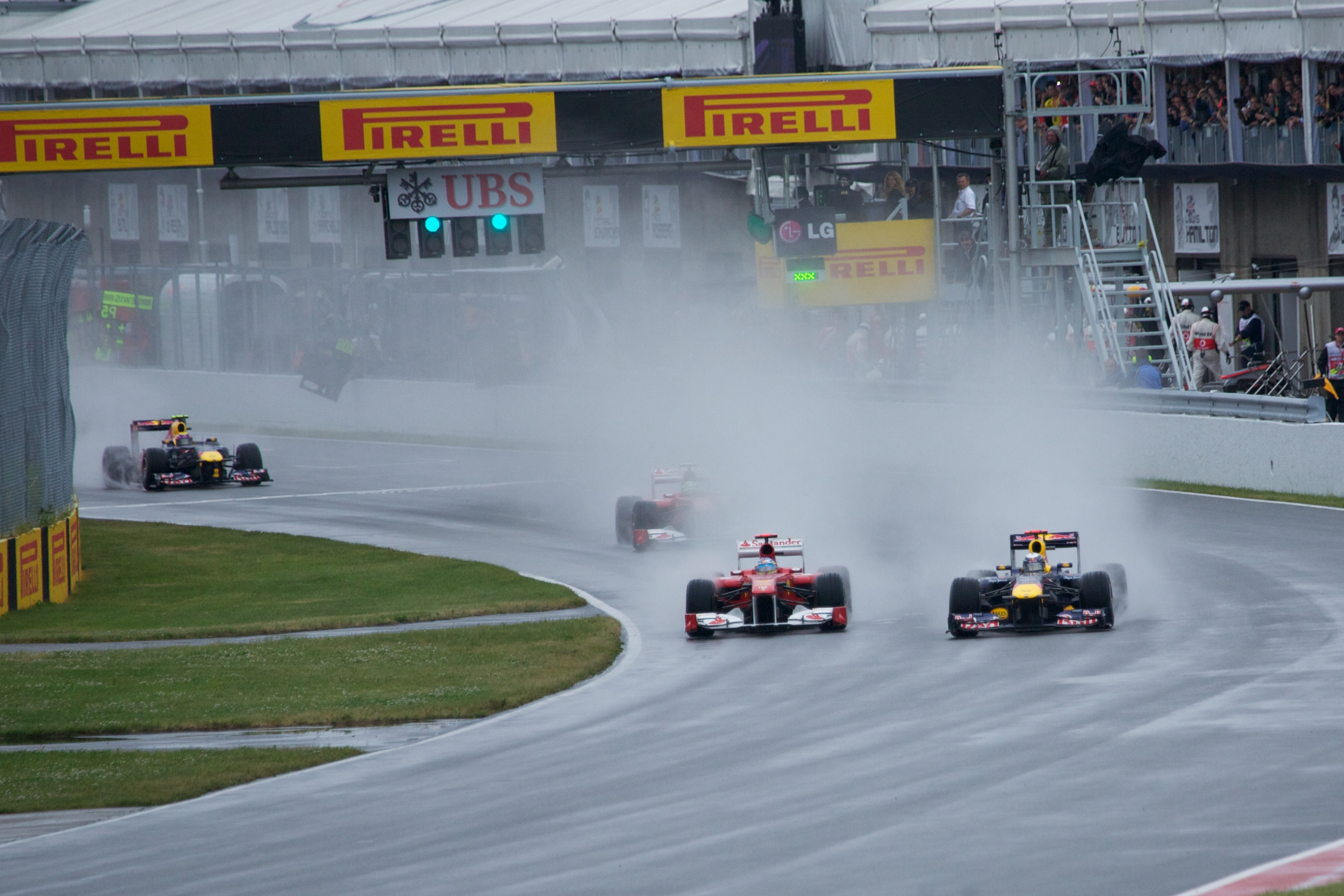
Start of the 2011 Canadian Grand Prix. The race was the longest ever F1 race to date due to rainstorms.

The 2011 Canadian Grand Prix became the longest ever Formula One race to date; rainstorms delayed the race for hours; but when it got going again Briton Jenson Button stormed through the field from last place after the restart on lap 41 and caught German leader Sebastian Vettel; whom he forced into making a mistake, passed the Red Bull driver and the Briton took victory, in what he described as "my best ever race". The 2013 Canadian Grand Prix saw Vettel dominate in his Red Bull, but it was also to see the first Formula One-related fatality in 12 years. Thirty-eight-year-old track marshal Mark Robinson was run over by a recovery vehicle, and the accident happened while marshals were removing the Sauber of Esteban Gutiérrez after the Mexican had spun off during the closing stages of the race. Robinson died later in hospital and became the first track-side death in Formula One since that of marshal Graham Beveridge at the 2001 Australian Grand Prix.

== Wildlife ==
In the weeks leading up the Grand Prix, city officials trap as many groundhogs as they can in and around the race course, and transport the animals to nearby Île Ste-Helene. Nonetheless, in 1990, Alessandro Nannini struck a groundhog on the track which damaged his tire. In 2007, Ralf Schumacher narrowly missed one during a practice session. On race day itself, Anthony Davidson had been running in third until he struck a groundhog, initially thought to be a beaver, which forced him to pit and repair the damage to his front wing. In 2008, a groundhog crossed the track at the hairpin in the second practice session but did not disrupt the session. In 2018, Romain Grosjean struck a groundhog in the second practice session on the approach to turn 13, damaging his front wing. In 2022, Nicholas Latifi hit a groundhog in the third practice session in the braking zone of turn 8. In 2025, Lewis Hamilton said he was "devastated" after running over a groundhog on the 13th lap of the race, leaving a hole in the floor of his SF-25 car. In 2026, Alex Albon struck a groundhog in the turn 6-7 chicane which sent his car offline and into the wall, causing enough damage to prevent him taking part in qualifying for the sprint race.

== Wall of Champions ==
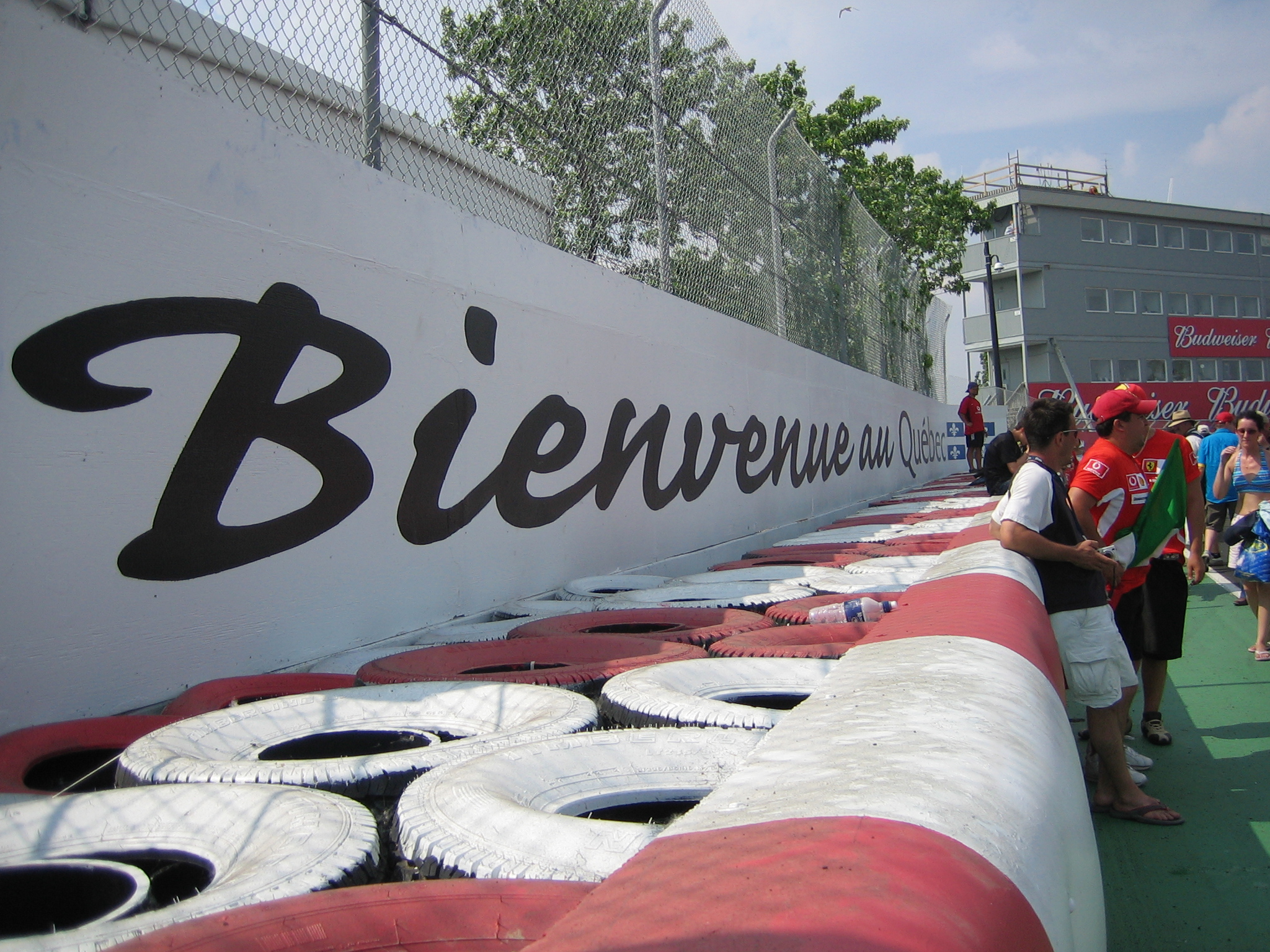
The "Wall of Champions"

The final corner of Circuit Gilles Villeneuve has seen a number of crashes involving former World Champions. In 1999, Damon Hill on lap 14, Michael Schumacher on lap 29 and Jacques Villeneuve on lap 34, all crashed into the same wall at the final chicane, which was then nicknamed the "Wall of Champions". The wall also was involved in a crash with Ricardo Zonta, who was, at the time, the reigning FIA GT sports car champion. CART Champion Juan Pablo Montoya, Formula Renault 3.5 Champion Carlos Sainz Jr. and 2009 Formula One World Champion Jenson Button have also crashed into the wall. In 2011 Friday practice the wall claimed four-time world champion Sebastian Vettel. During Q2 in 2019, former Formula Renault 3.5 champion, Kevin Magnussen crashed at the wall.

== Winners ==
=== By year ===
A pink background indicates an event which was not part of the Formula One World Championship.

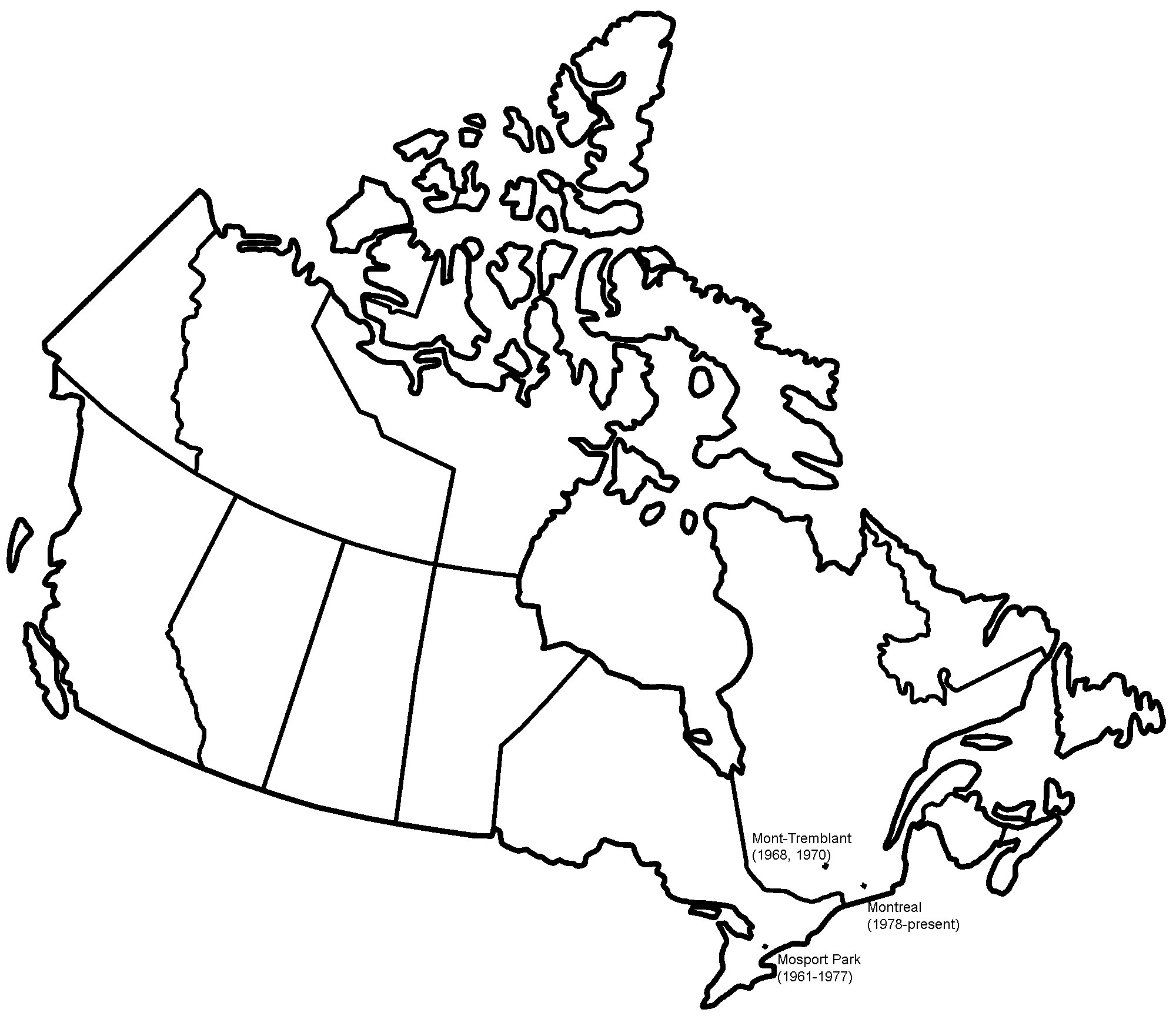
A map of all the locations of the Canadian Grand Prix.

Year	Driver	Constructor	Location	Report
1961	(Canada) Peter Ryan	Lotus-Climax	Mosport Park	Report
1962	(United States) Masten Gregory	Lotus-Climax	Mosport Park	Report
1963	(Mexico) Pedro Rodríguez	Ferrari	Mosport Park	Report
1964	(Mexico) Pedro Rodríguez	Ferrari	Mosport Park	Report
1965	(United States) Jim Hall	Chaparral-Chevrolet	Mosport Park	Report
1966	(United States) Mark Donohue	Lola-Chevrolet	Mosport Park	Report
1967	(Australia) Jack Brabham	Brabham-Repco	Mosport Park	Report
1968	(New Zealand) Denny Hulme	McLaren-Ford	Mont-Tremblant	Report
1969	(Belgium) Jacky Ickx	Brabham-Ford	Mosport Park	Report
1970	(Belgium) Jacky Ickx	Ferrari	Mont-Tremblant	Report
1971	(United Kingdom) Jackie Stewart	Tyrrell-Ford	Mosport Park	Report
1972	(United Kingdom) Jackie Stewart	Tyrrell-Ford	Mosport Park	Report
1973	(United States) Peter Revson	McLaren-Ford	Mosport Park	Report
1974	(Brazil) Emerson Fittipaldi	McLaren-Ford	Mosport Park	Report
1975	Not held			
1976	(United Kingdom) James Hunt	McLaren-Ford	Mosport Park	Report
1977	(South Africa) Jody Scheckter	Wolf-Ford	Mosport Park	Report
1978	(Canada) Gilles Villeneuve	Ferrari	Circuit Île Notre-Dame	Report
1979	(Australia) Alan Jones	Williams-Ford	Circuit Île Notre-Dame	Report
1980	(Australia) Alan Jones	Williams-Ford	Circuit Île Notre-Dame	Report
1981	(France) Jacques Laffite	Ligier-Matra	Circuit Île Notre-Dame	Report
1982	(Brazil) Nelson Piquet	Brabham-BMW	Circuit Gilles Villeneuve	Report
1983	(France) René Arnoux	Ferrari	Circuit Gilles Villeneuve	Report
1984	(Brazil) Nelson Piquet	Brabham-BMW	Circuit Gilles Villeneuve	Report
1985	(Italy) Michele Alboreto	Ferrari	Circuit Gilles Villeneuve	Report
1986	(United Kingdom) Nigel Mansell	Williams-Honda	Circuit Gilles Villeneuve	Report
1987	Not held due to a sponsorship dispute between Labatt and Molson			
1988	(Brazil) Ayrton Senna	McLaren-Honda	Circuit Gilles Villeneuve	Report
1989	(Belgium) Thierry Boutsen	Williams-Renault	Circuit Gilles Villeneuve	Report
1990	(Brazil) Ayrton Senna	McLaren-Honda	Circuit Gilles Villeneuve	Report
1991	(Brazil) Nelson Piquet	Benetton-Ford	Circuit Gilles Villeneuve	Report
1992	(Austria) Gerhard Berger	McLaren-Honda	Circuit Gilles Villeneuve	Report
1993	(France) Alain Prost	Williams-Renault	Circuit Gilles Villeneuve	Report
1994	(Germany) Michael Schumacher	Benetton-Ford	Circuit Gilles Villeneuve	Report
1995	(France) Jean Alesi	Ferrari	Circuit Gilles Villeneuve	Report
1996	(United Kingdom) Damon Hill	Williams-Renault	Circuit Gilles Villeneuve	Report
1997	(Germany) Michael Schumacher	Ferrari	Circuit Gilles Villeneuve	Report
1998	(Germany) Michael Schumacher	Ferrari	Circuit Gilles Villeneuve	Report
1999	(Finland) Mika Häkkinen	McLaren-Mercedes	Circuit Gilles Villeneuve	Report
2000	(Germany) Michael Schumacher	Ferrari	Circuit Gilles Villeneuve	Report
2001	(Germany) Ralf Schumacher	Williams-BMW	Circuit Gilles Villeneuve	Report
2002	(Germany) Michael Schumacher	Ferrari	Circuit Gilles Villeneuve	Report
2003	(Germany) Michael Schumacher	Ferrari	Circuit Gilles Villeneuve	Report
2004	(Germany) Michael Schumacher	Ferrari	Circuit Gilles Villeneuve	Report
2005	(Finland) Kimi Räikkönen	McLaren-Mercedes	Circuit Gilles Villeneuve	Report
2006	(Spain) Fernando Alonso	Renault	Circuit Gilles Villeneuve	Report
2007	(United Kingdom) Lewis Hamilton	McLaren-Mercedes	Circuit Gilles Villeneuve	Report
2008	(Poland) Robert Kubica	BMW Sauber	Circuit Gilles Villeneuve	Report
2009	Not held			
2010	(United Kingdom) Lewis Hamilton	McLaren-Mercedes	Circuit Gilles Villeneuve	Report
2011	(United Kingdom) Jenson Button	McLaren-Mercedes	Circuit Gilles Villeneuve	Report
2012	(United Kingdom) Lewis Hamilton	McLaren-Mercedes	Circuit Gilles Villeneuve	Report
2013	(Germany) Sebastian Vettel	Red Bull-Renault	Circuit Gilles Villeneuve	Report
2014	(Australia) Daniel Ricciardo	Red Bull-Renault	Circuit Gilles Villeneuve	Report
2015	(United Kingdom) Lewis Hamilton	Mercedes	Circuit Gilles Villeneuve	Report
2016	(United Kingdom) Lewis Hamilton	Mercedes	Circuit Gilles Villeneuve	Report
2017	(United Kingdom) Lewis Hamilton	Mercedes	Circuit Gilles Villeneuve	Report
2018	(Germany) Sebastian Vettel	Ferrari	Circuit Gilles Villeneuve	Report
2019	(United Kingdom) Lewis Hamilton	Mercedes	Circuit Gilles Villeneuve	Report
2020 – 2021	Not held due to COVID-19 pandemic			
2022	(Netherlands) Max Verstappen	Red Bull-RBPT	Circuit Gilles Villeneuve	Report
2023	(Netherlands) Max Verstappen	Red Bull-Honda RBPT	Circuit Gilles Villeneuve	Report
2024	(Netherlands) Max Verstappen	Red Bull-Honda RBPT	Circuit Gilles Villeneuve	Report
2025	(United Kingdom) George Russell	Mercedes	Circuit Gilles Villeneuve	Report
2026	(Italy) Kimi Antonelli	Mercedes	Circuit Gilles Villeneuve	Report

=== Repeat winners (drivers) ===
Drivers in bold are competing in the Formula One championship in 2026.
A pink background indicates an event which was not part of the Formula One World Championship.

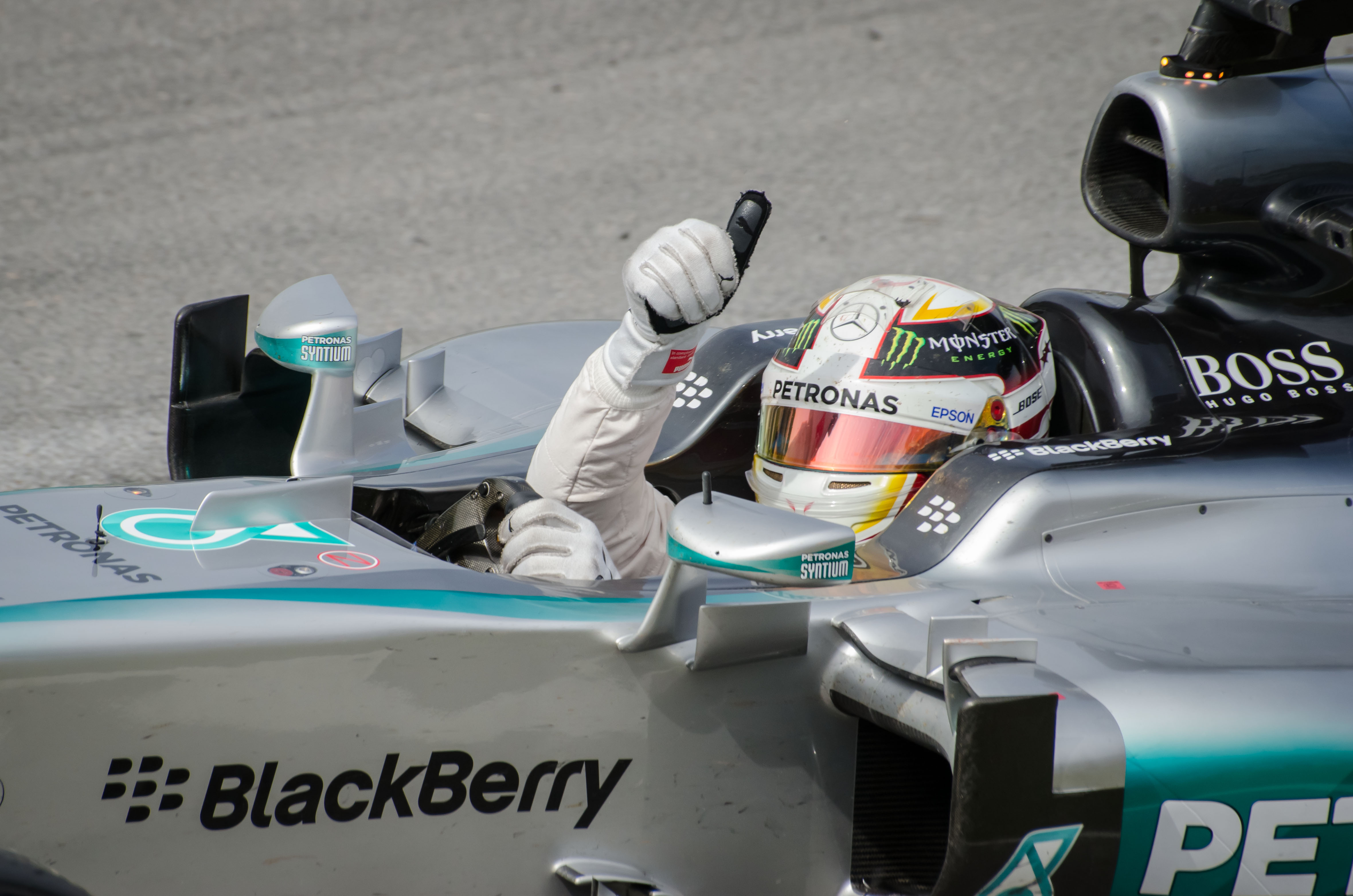
Lewis Hamilton celebrates winning the 2015 Canadian Grand Prix

Wins	Driver	Years won
7	(Germany) Michael Schumacher	1994, 1997, 1998, 2000, 2002, 2003, 2004
7	(United Kingdom) **Lewis Hamilton**	2007, 2010, 2012, 2015, 2016, 2017, 2019
3	(Brazil) Nelson Piquet	1982, 1984, 1991
3	(Netherlands) **Max Verstappen**	2022, 2023, 2024
2	(Mexico) Pedro Rodríguez	1963, 1964
2	(Belgium) Jacky Ickx	1969, 1970
2	(United Kingdom) Jackie Stewart	1971, 1972
2	(Australia) Alan Jones	1979, 1980
2	(Brazil) Ayrton Senna	1988, 1990
2	(Germany) Sebastian Vettel	2013, 2018

=== Repeat winners (constructors) ===
Teams in bold are competing in the Formula One championship in 2026.
A pink background indicates an event which was not part of the Formula One World Championship.

Wins	Constructor	Years won
14	(Italy) **Ferrari**	1963, 1964, 1970, 1978, 1983, 1985, 1995, 1997, 1998, 2000, 2002, 2003, 2004, 2018
13	(United Kingdom) **McLaren**	1968, 1973, 1974, 1976, 1988, 1990, 1992, 1999, 2005, 2007, 2010, 2011, 2012
7	(United Kingdom) **Williams**	1979, 1980, 1986, 1989, 1993, 1996, 2001
6	(Germany) **Mercedes**	2015, 2016, 2017, 2019, 2025, 2026
5	(Austria) **Red Bull**	2013, 2014, 2022, 2023, 2024
4	(United Kingdom) Brabham	1967, 1969, 1982, 1984
2	(United Kingdom) Lotus	1961, 1962
2	(United Kingdom) Tyrrell	1971, 1972
2	(United Kingdom) Benetton	1991, 1994

=== Repeat winners (engine manufacturers) ===
Manufacturers in bold are competing in the Formula One championship in 2026.
A pink background indicates an event which was not part of the Formula One World Championship.

Wins	Manufacturer	Years won
14	(Italy) **Ferrari**	1963, 1964, 1970, 1978, 1983, 1985, 1995, 1997, 1998, 2000, 2002, 2003, 2004, 2018
12	(United States) Ford *	1968, 1969, 1971, 1972, 1973, 1974, 1976, 1977, 1979, 1980, 1991, 1994
12	(Germany) **Mercedes** **	1999, 2005, 2007, 2010, 2011, 2012, 2015, 2016, 2017, 2019, 2025, 2026
6	(France) Renault	1989, 1993, 1996, 2006, 2013, 2014
4	(Japan) **Honda**	1986, 1988, 1990, 1992
4	(Germany) BMW	1982, 1984, 2001, 2008
2	(United Kingdom) Climax	1961, 1962
2	(United States) Chevrolet	1965, 1966
2	(Japan) Honda RBPT	2023, 2024

* Built by Cosworth, funded by Ford

** Between 1999 and 2005 built by Ilmor, funded by Mercedes

== Previous circuits used ==
Mosport Park (1967, 1969, 1971–1974, 1976–1977)

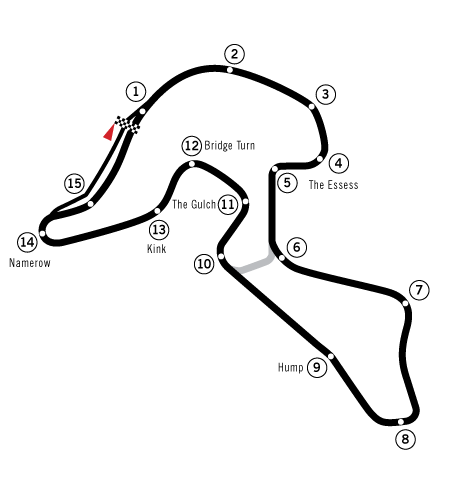
Circuit Mont-Tremblant (1968, 1970)

Circuit Île Notre Dame/Gilles Villeneuve (1978–1986)

Circuit Gilles Villeneuve (1988–1993)

Circuit Gilles Villeneuve (1994–1995)

Circuit Gilles Villeneuve (1996–2001)
