= 1961 United States Grand Prix =

Race details
- Date: October 8, 1961
- Official name: IV Grand Prix of the United States
- Location: Watkins Glen Grand Prix Race Course; Watkins Glen, New York
- Course: Permanent road course
- Course length: 3.78 km (2.35 miles)
- Distance: 100 laps, 378 km (235 miles)
- Weather: Temperatures up to 22 °C (72 °F); Wind speeds up to 16.48 km/h (10.24 mph)

Pole position
Driver	(Australia) Jack Brabham	Cooper-Climax
- Time: 1:17.0

Fastest lap
Driver	(Australia) Jack Brabham	Cooper-Climax
- Time: 1:18.2 on lap 28

Podium
First	(United Kingdom) Innes Ireland	Lotus-Climax
Second	(United States) Dan Gurney	Porsche
Third	(United Kingdom) Tony Brooks	BRM-Climax

The 1961 United States Grand Prix was a Formula One motor race held on October 8, 1961, at the Watkins Glen Grand Prix Race Course in Watkins Glen, New York. It was the eighth and final race in both the 1961 World Championship of Drivers and the 1961 International Cup for Formula One Manufacturers.

The United States Grand Prix had been held at two different circuits in its previous three runnings, but subsequently remained at Watkins Glen until 1980. The season-ending race was won by British driver Innes Ireland, his only career Grand Prix win. He started eighth, took the lead when the engine in Stirling Moss' Lotus failed, and finished 4.3 seconds ahead of American Dan Gurney. The win was the first victory for Colin Chapman's Team Lotus.

== Background ==
By the time of the Watkins Glen event, the 1961 season had seen Californian Phil Hill crowned the first American World Champion. However, he did not take part in the race as the Scuderia Ferrari team had remained home. In the previous race, the Italian Grand Prix at Monza, Ferrari driver and team leader Wolfgang von Trips had been killed in a crash while leading the Drivers' Championship, handing victory and the Championship to Hill. Since Ferrari had clinched the Constructors' Championship as well as the Drivers', the team chose not to make the trip across the Atlantic for the season finale.

There had been considerable doubt about whether the US race would even take place, since the FIA did not grant the Watkins Glen Grand Prix Corporation final approval for the event until August 28. By October, however, the field was missing only the Ferrari team.

Howard Hughes visited the pits to meet with John Cooper about expanding his car manufacturing business. A photograph taken of Hughes in the pits and published in the May 10, 1976, issue of Time magazine was the last known photograph of him.

== Qualifying ==
While all but the two Porsche entries had Climax engines, only Jack Brabham of the factory Cooper team, and Stirling Moss, in Rob Walker's privately entered Lotus, had the newest developmental V8 version available to them. Moss set the pace on Saturday with a lap time of 1:18.2 in his 4-cylinder car, then posted a 1:17.2 with the V8. Brabham, the just-deposed two-time World Champion, responded by taking the pole with a 1:17.0. When Moss decided to use the older 4-cylinder in the race, saying that the car handled better with it, he dropped back to the second row of the grid, next to Brabham's teammate, Bruce McLaren. Graham Hill's BRM, a tenth quicker than the other 4-cylinder cars, was alongside Brabham on the front row, a second slower than the Australian.

Jim Clark, in one works Lotus, took fifth spot, while Ireland, his teammate, qualified eighth. On Friday, Ireland spun to the edge of the woods in the 180-degree South Loop when his steering failed. The following day, before he could put in a serious time, his gearbox broke. The back of the grid was filled largely with independent North American drivers in uncompetitive cars. Canadian Peter Ryan, in his only grand prix, led a group containing Walt Hansgen, Roger Penske, Hap Sharp, Jim Hall and Lloyd Ruby. Penske's car was one of the first instances of commercial sponsorship in F1, painted in bright DuPont Anti-Freeze yellow.

== Race summary ==
A paid crowd of 28,000 (total around 60,000) attended the race on Sunday. At the start, Brabham led the field off the grid and into the first corner, but before the end of the first lap, Moss had moved into the lead. These two were followed by Ireland (up from eighth), Hill, Dan Gurney, Masten Gregory and McLaren. On lap three, McLaren moved up to third when Ireland spun on oil at the end of the straight. "I nearly went out of the race," he said. "I went into a whirl, a 360-degree spin, cars were whipping past." He recovered and continued in eleventh.

By lap 10, Ireland had already moved up to fourth, behind McLaren's Cooper, as Moss and Brabham continued to draw away at a second a lap, swapping the lead back and forth. At about one-third distance, on lap 34, Brabham's V8 began to leak water and overheat. With puffs of smoke appearing from the left-side exhaust, the Cooper dropped back from Moss and finally entered the pits on lap 45. After taking on water and returning to the race, Brabham completed only seven more laps before retiring.

Leading now by over 40 seconds, Moss seemed on his way to a comfortable victory. However, his oil pressure was dropping, and on lap 59, the dark blue Lotus peeled off and retired suddenly, handing the lead to Ireland. Hill was right on the tail of the Scot, hounding him for 15 laps, until he, too, suddenly coasted down the pit lane with a loose magneto wire. The next challenger was Roy Salvadori, who began trimming the lead from 20 seconds down to five with only five laps left. But it was Ireland's day. With just over three laps remaining, Salvadori's privately entered Cooper blew its engine, just as his teammate John Surtees' car had done on the first lap.

Ireland came home under the waving checkered flag of Tex Hopkins, less than five seconds ahead of American Dan Gurney, as Britain's Tony Brooks finished the last GP of his career in third. "I was lucky," said Ireland. "I could not take Moss or Brabham. Their cars were too fast. I had no fuel pressure in the last ten laps, and ended up with a thimbleful of gas at the finish."

It was Ireland's only World Championship win, the first World Championship win for Team Lotus, and the first American Grand Prix to turn a profit, ensuring its return in 1962. It was Moss's last World Championship race, as his career was ended by a heavy accident during the 1962 Glover Trophy race at Goodwood the following April.

== Classification ==
=== Qualifying ===
Pos	No	Driver	Constructor	Qualifying times		Gap
Pos	No	Driver	Constructor	Q1	Q2	Gap
1	1	(Australia) Jack Brabham	Cooper-Climax	1:17.3	1:17.0	—
2	4	(United Kingdom) Graham Hill	BRM-Climax	1:18.8	1:18.1	+1.1
3	7	(United Kingdom) Stirling Moss	Lotus-Climax	1:18.7	1:18.2†	+1.2
4	2	(New Zealand) Bruce McLaren	Cooper-Climax	1:18.7	1:18.2	+1.2
5	5	(United Kingdom) Tony Brooks	BRM-Climax	1:19.4	1:18.3	+1.3
6	14	(United Kingdom) Jim Clark	Lotus-Climax	1:20.6	1:18.3	+1.3
7	12	(United States) Dan Gurney	Porsche	1:19.0	1:18.6	+1.6
8	15	(United Kingdom) Innes Ireland	Lotus-Climax	1:20.0	1:18.8	+1.8
9	18	(United Kingdom) John Surtees	Cooper-Climax	1:19.0	1:18.9	+1.9
10	11	(Sweden) Jo Bonnier	Porsche	1:19.4	1:18.9	+1.9
11	22	(United States) Masten Gregory	Lotus-Climax	1:19.1	1:20.5	+2.1
12	19	(United Kingdom) Roy Salvadori	Cooper-Climax	1:19.6	1:19.2	+2.2
13	16	(Canada) Peter Ryan	Lotus-Climax	1:26.0	1:20.0	+3.0
14	60	(United States) Walt Hansgen	Cooper-Climax	1:22.9	1:20.4	+3.4
15	21	(Belgium) Olivier Gendebien	Lotus-Climax	1:22.7	1:20.5	+3.5
16	6	(United States) Roger Penske	Cooper-Climax	1:22.6	1:20.6	+3.6
17	3	(United States) Hap Sharp	Cooper-Climax	No time	1:21.0	+4.0
18	17	(United States) Jim Hall	Lotus-Climax	1:22.3	1:21.8	+4.8
19	26	(United States) Lloyd Ruby	Lotus-Climax	1:22.5	1:21.8	+4.8

† Moss registered a laptime of 1:17.2 in Q2 using a car with a 4-cylinder engine, but decided to race with his V8-powered machine, and was placed on the grid with his best time in the V8..

=== Race ===
Pos	No	Driver	Constructor	Laps	Time/Retired	Grid	Points
1	15	(United Kingdom) Innes Ireland	Lotus-Climax	100	2:13:45.8	8	9
2	12	(United States) Dan Gurney	Porsche	100	+4.3 secs	7	6
3	5	(United Kingdom) Tony Brooks	BRM-Climax	100	+49.0 secs	5	4
4	2	(New Zealand) Bruce McLaren	Cooper-Climax	100	+58.0 secs	4	3
5	4	(United Kingdom) Graham Hill	BRM-Climax	99	+1 Lap	2	2
6	11	(Sweden) Jo Bonnier	Porsche	98	+2 Laps	10	1
7	14	(United Kingdom) Jim Clark	Lotus-Climax	96	+4 Laps	6	
8	6	(United States) Roger Penske	Cooper-Climax	96	+4 Laps	16	
9	16	(Canada) Peter Ryan	Lotus-Climax	96	+4 Laps	13	
10	3	(United States) Hap Sharp	Cooper-Climax	93	+7 Laps	17	
11	21	(Belgium) Olivier Gendebien (United States) Masten Gregory	Lotus-Climax	92	+8 Laps	15	
Ret	19	(United Kingdom) Roy Salvadori	Cooper-Climax	96	Engine	12	
Ret	17	(United States) Jim Hall	Lotus-Climax	76	Fuel Leak	18	
Ret	26	(United States) Lloyd Ruby	Lotus-Climax	76	Magneto	19	
Ret	7	(United Kingdom) Stirling Moss	Lotus-Climax	58	Engine	3	
Ret	1	(Australia) Jack Brabham	Cooper-Climax	57	Overheating	1	
Ret	22	(United States) Masten Gregory	Lotus-Climax	23	Gearbox	11	
Ret	60	(United States) Walt Hansgen	Cooper-Climax	14	Accident	14	
Ret	18	(United Kingdom) John Surtees	Cooper-Climax	0	Engine	9	
WD	8	(United States) Phil Hill	Ferrari		Team withdrew		
WD	9	(United States) Richie Ginther	Ferrari		Team withdrew		
WD	10	(Mexico) Pedro Rodríguez	Ferrari		Team withdrew		
DNA	23	(United Kingdom) Ken Miles	Lotus-Climax		Not present		

== Notes ==
- This was the Formula One World Championship debut for American drivers Roger Penske and Hap Sharp and Canadian driver Peter Ryan. It was also the first race for a Canadian driver.
- This was the second win of a United States Grand Prix by a Lotus, breaking the old record set by Cooper.

== Final Championship standings ==
- **Bold text** indicates the World Champions.

Drivers' Championship standings

	Pos	Driver	Points
	1	(United States) **Phil Hill**	34 (38)
	2	(Germany) Wolfgang von Trips	33
	3	(United Kingdom) Stirling Moss	21
1	4	(United States) Dan Gurney	21
1	5	(United States) Richie Ginther	16

Constructors' Championship standings

Pos	Constructor	Points
1	(Italy) **Ferrari**	40 (52)
2	(United Kingdom) Lotus-Climax	32
3	(Germany) Porsche	22 (23)
4	(United Kingdom) Cooper-Climax	14 (18)
5	(United Kingdom) BRM-Climax	7

- Notes: Only the top five positions are included for both sets of standings. Only the best 5 results counted towards the Championship. Numbers without parentheses are Championship points; numbers in parentheses are total points scored.

Previous race: 1961 Italian Grand Prix	FIA Formula One World Championship; 1961 season	Next race: 1962 Dutch Grand Prix
Previous race: 1960 United States Grand Prix	United States Grand Prix	Next race: 1962 United States Grand Prix
