= Lotus 19 =

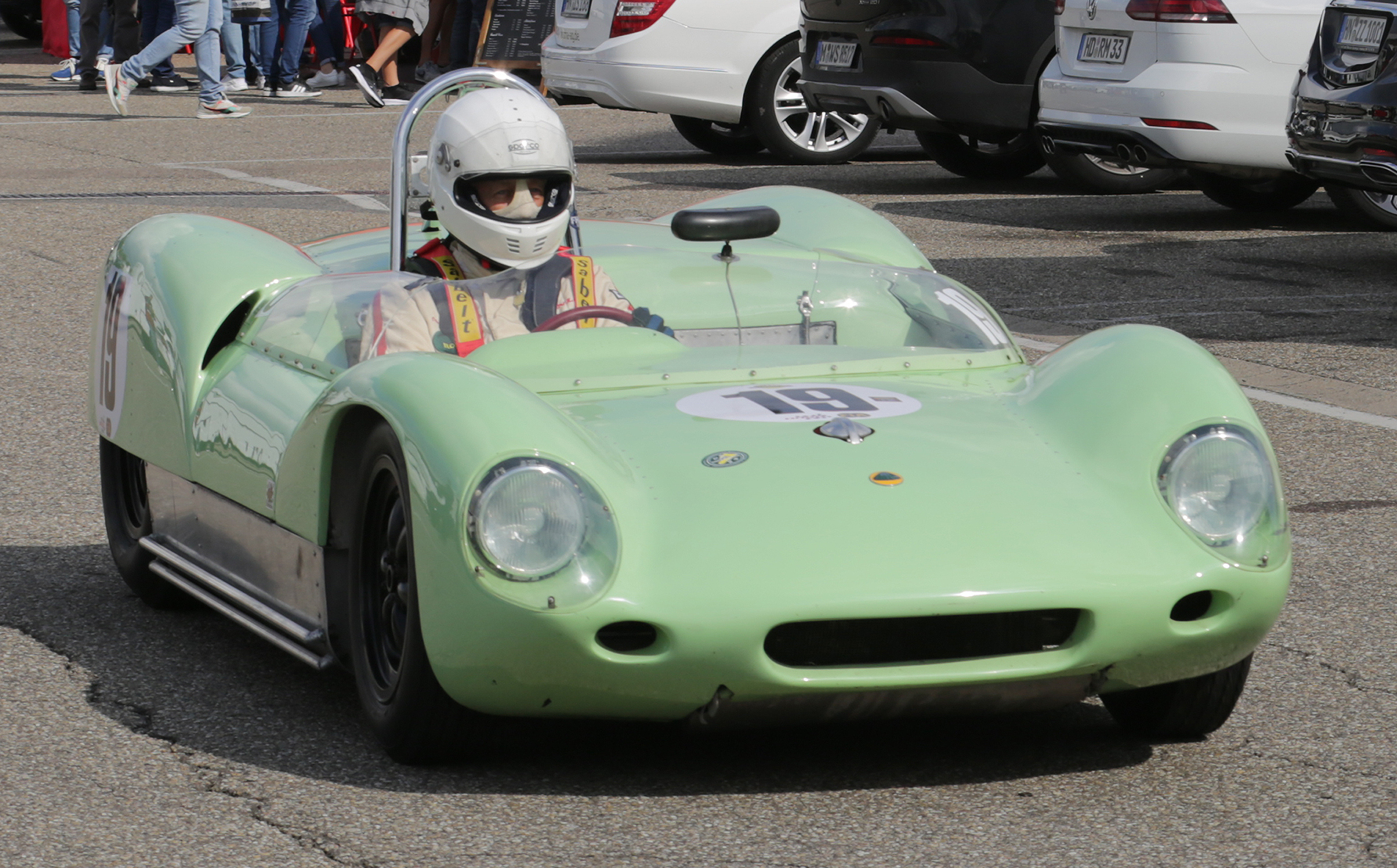
- Lotus Mk 19 # 952 at Hockenheim Historic 2021

Overview
- Manufacturer: Lotus Cars
- Production: 1960–1962
- Designer: Colin Chapman

Body and chassis
- Class: Group 4 sports car
- Body style: Fiberglass non-stressed

Powertrain
- Engine: Coventry Climax FPF

Dimensions
- Wheelbase: 95 in (2,413 mm)
- Length: 141 in (3,581 mm)
- Width: 60.5 in (1,537 mm)
- Height: 31 in (787 mm)
- Kerb weight: 1,000 lb (454 kg)-1,240 lb (562 kg) (dry)

Chronology
- Predecessor: Lotus 15
- Successor: Lotus 23

The Lotus 19 or Monte Carlo is a mid-engine sports-racing car designed by Colin Chapman of Lotus and built from 1960 until 1962.

== Lotus 19 ==
The 19 is a mid-engine, rear wheel drive sports racer with a fiberglass body over a space frame, originally designed with 1.5 - 2.75L Coventry Climax FPF engine built for Grand Prix cars, mated to Lotus' own five-speed sequential transaxle nicknamed 'Queerbox' which gave a lot of problems on the Lotus 15, but was improved in its reliability for the Lotus 18. American-engined examples mostly had a Colotti transaxle.

Chapman named the car Monte Carlo to honor Stirling Moss for his win at the 1960 Monaco Grand Prix. Lotus' first F1 victory. This is said to have mimicked and declared competition against the Cooper Monaco, which was named after a win at Monaco in 1958.

== 19B ==
Towards the end of 1963, John Klug, founder of Pacesetter Homes Racing, commissioned Lotus to build a special 19 to be Ford V8 powered. Ford's new lightweight iron block 289 c.i. engine was chosen over Oldsmobile's smaller aluminum V8. Roy Campbell finished the car in southern California. Dan Gurney, who had enjoyed considerable success at the wheel of the Arciero Brothers Lotus 19-Climax as the driver.

Because of its unique specification, it was known as the 19B, the only 19 with this designation. Originally delivered in red livery, the car first appeared at Nassau in December 1963. In 1964 it was the fastest sports car in the world, but the car's weak spot was its Colotti transaxle, the failure of which led to a number of retirements. By mid-1965 it was obsolete. It continued racing in southern California and eventually dropped out of sight. Wayne Linden of Roseville, California, found it in a semi trailer waiting to be turned into a dune buggy. He restored it to its early-1964 configuration, except for the Colotti, and ran it in mostly Cobra club events. He sold it to Gordon and Nancy Gimble. Today the car regularly appears at vintage car events in the US and may be on display at Cobra Experience museum in Martinez, Calif.

== Chassis numbers ==
There were seventeen Lotus 19s built, however many were wrecked and some were completely rebuilt.

Chassis	Original owner	Motor
950	British Racing Partnership	2.5 Climax
951	Arciero Brothers	2.5 Climax
952	British Racing Partnership sold to Team Rosebud	2.0 Climax/Ferrari V-12 3.0 in 1963
953	British Racing Partnership	2.5 Climax
954	J. Frank Harrison	2.5 Climax later as Harrison Special-289 Ford
955	Jack Nethercutt	2.5 Climax
956	Charles Vogele	2.5 Climax changed to 2.0 Climax for hillclimbs
957	Tom Carstens	Empty - 3.5 Buick fitted changed to Chevy V8
958	Roy Schechter	2.5 Climax
959	Peter Ryan	2.5 Climax
960	Robert Publicker	1.5 Climax
961	Harry Zweifel	2.0 Climax for hillclimbs
962	Rod Carveth	Empty - 3.5 Buick fitted
963	Henry Olds/Bob Colombosian	Empty - 3.5 Buick fitted
964	John Coundley	2.5 Climax
965	Mecom Racing Team	empty - 2.0 Climax fitted changed to 3.5 Buick
966	John Klug	289 Ford

== Racing victories ==
Race	Circuit	Driver
1961 Canadian Grand Prix	Mosport Park	Peter Ryan
1962 Daytona 3 Hours	Daytona International Speedway	Dan Gurney
1962 Nassau Trophy Race	Oakes Field Course	Innes Ireland
1964 Australian Tourist Trophy	Longford Circuit	Frank Matich
