= 1964 Australian Tourist Trophy =

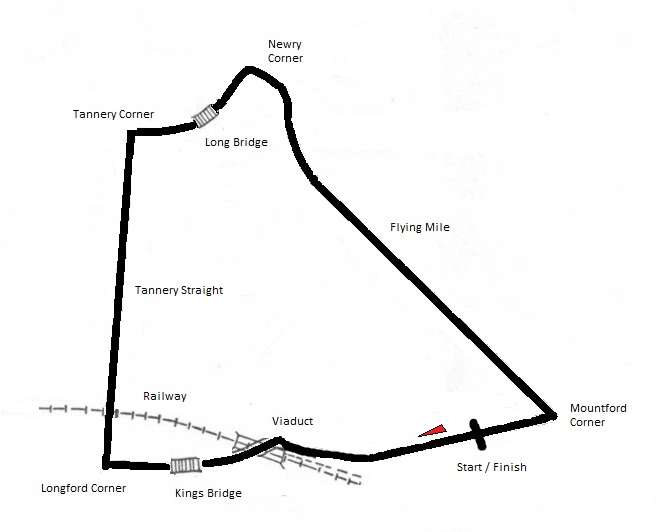
Layout of the Longford Circuit (1953-1968)

The 1964 Australian Tourist Trophy was a motor race staged at the Longford Circuit in Tasmania, Australia on 29 February 1964. It was the eighth annual Australian Tourist Trophy race. The race was open to sports cars as defined by the Confederation of Australian Motor Sport (CAMS) in its Appendix C regulations, and it was recognized by CAMS as the Australian championship for sports cars. It was won by Frank Matich driving a Lotus 19B.

== Results ==
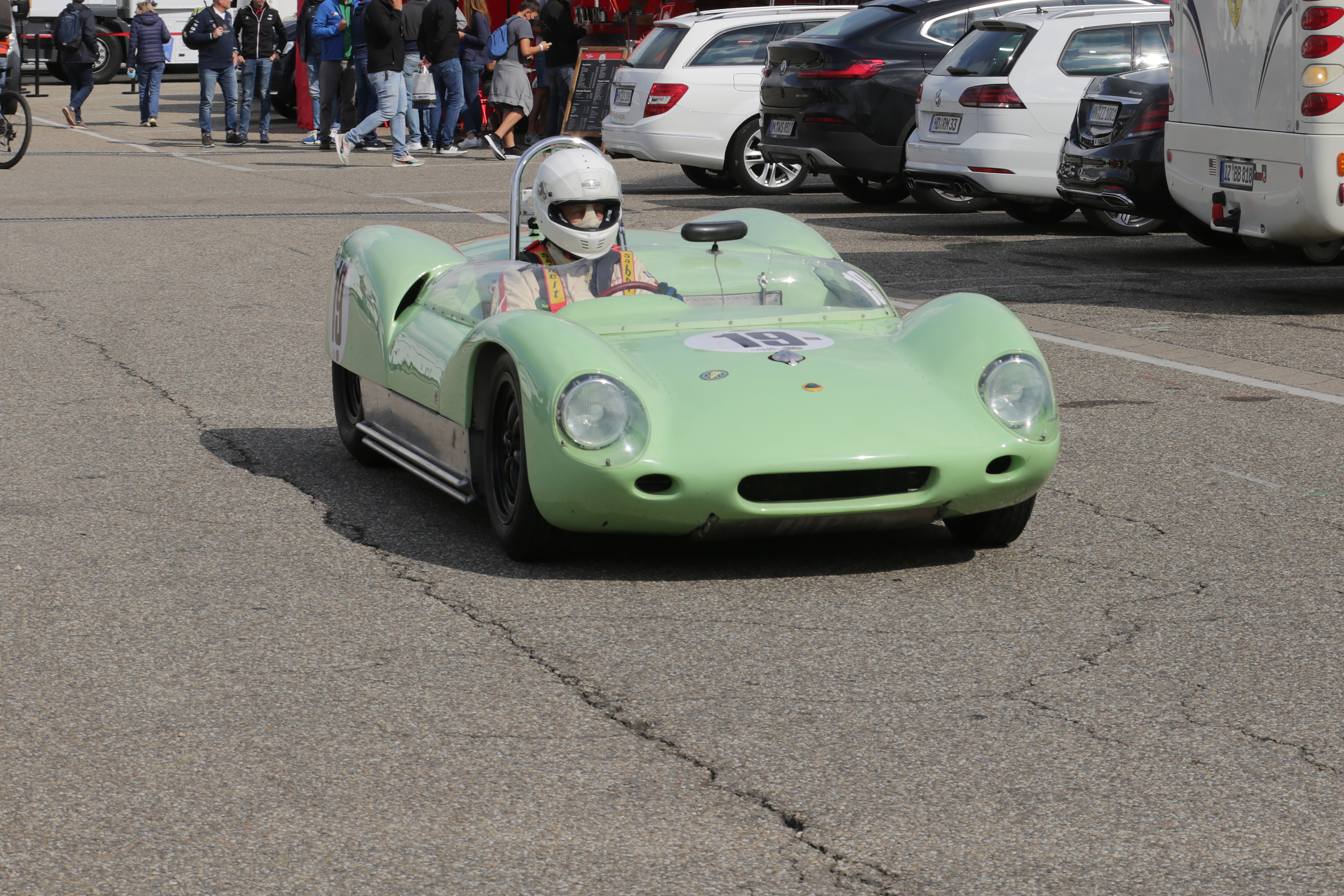
Frank Matich won the race driving a Lotus 19B, similar to the car pictured above.

| Position | Driver | No. | Car | Entrant | Class pos. | Class | Laps | Time / Remarks |
| 1 | Frank Matich | 87 | Lotus 19B | Total Team Laurie O'Neill | 1 | 1501 to 3000cc | 23 | 61:18.4 |
| 2 | Bob Jane | | Jaguar E-Type Lightweight | | 1 | 3001cc and over | 23 | 61:46.9 |
| 3 | Greg Cusack | | Elfin Mallala Ford | Scuderia Veloce | 1 | 1101 to 1500cc | 23 | 63:23.8 |
| 4 | Les Howard | | Lotus 23 Ford | | 1 | Up to 1100cc | | 63.09.2 |
| 5 | Bryan Thomson | 17 | Elfin Mallala Coventry Climax | | 2 | 1501 to 3000cc | | 65:57.5 |
| ? | David Price | | Elfin Coventry Climax | | 2 | Up to 1100cc | 20 | 63:11.3 |
| ? | Ralph Terry | | Austin-Healey Sprite | | 3 | Up to 1100cc | 15 | |
| ? | Alan Ling | | Lotus Super 7 | | 2 | 1101 to 1500cc | | 62:36.0 |
| ? | John Pooley | | Pooley Mk II | | 3 | 1101 to 1500cc | | |
| ? | J. Edwards | | Morgan Plus Six | | 3 | 1501 to 3000cc | | |
| ? | Tom Sulman | | Lotus | | ? | | | |
| DNF | Frank Gardner | 1 | Lotus 23B | Alec Mildren Racing Pty Ltd | - | 1101 to 1500cc | 20 | Gearbox |
| Disq | Bib Stillwell | 6 | Cooper Monaco | | - | 1501 to 3000cc | | |
| Disq | Frank Coad | | Lotus 15 | | - | | | |

- Stillwell was the first competitor to finish however he was disqualified for having received a push-start prior to the commencement of the race.
- Coad was disqualified for a similar infringement.

=== Race statistics ===
- Race distance: 23 laps – 103½ miles
- Pole Position: Frank Matich (Lotus 19B)
- Number of starters: not yet ascertained
- Number of finishers: not yet ascertained
- Winner's average speed: 101.25 mph
- Fastest lap: 2 minute 53.9 seconds, Frank Matich, (Lotus 19B)
- Best time on Flying Mile: 150 mph, Frank Matich, (Lotus 19B)
