= 2010 Canadian Grand Prix =

Race 8 of 19 in the 2010 Formula One World Championship
← Previous race	Next race →

Race details
- Date: 13 June 2010
- Official name: Formula 1 Grand Prix du Canada 2010
- Location: Circuit Gilles Villeneuve, Montreal, Quebec, Canada
- Course: Street circuit
- Course length: 4.361 km (2.710 miles)
- Distance: 70 laps, 305.270 km (189.686 miles)
- Weather: Warm with temperatures approaching 26 °C (79 °F); wind speeds up to 4.9 kilometres per hour (3.0 mph)

Pole position
Driver	(United Kingdom) Lewis Hamilton	McLaren-Mercedes
- Time: 1:15.105

Fastest lap
Driver	(Poland) Robert Kubica	Renault
- Time: 1:16.972 on lap 67

Podium
First	(United Kingdom) Lewis Hamilton	McLaren-Mercedes
Second	(United Kingdom) Jenson Button	McLaren-Mercedes
Third	(Spain) Fernando Alonso	Ferrari

The 2010 Canadian Grand Prix (formally the Formula 1 Grand Prix du Canada 2010) was the eighth round of the 2010 Formula One season. It was held in Montreal, Quebec, Canada at the Circuit Gilles Villeneuve on 13 June 2010. This was the first Grand Prix to be held on the North American continent since the 2008 Canadian Grand Prix. The race was won by McLaren driver Lewis Hamilton, his second Canadian Grand Prix victory, ahead of teammate Jenson Button and Ferrari driver Fernando Alonso.

The race was the first time since the 1991 United States Grand Prix that three former drivers' champions stood on the podium and the last 1–2 finish for the McLaren team until the 2021 Italian Grand Prix. It was also the last time until the 2022 São Paulo Grand Prix where British drivers finished first and second on the podium. The final result meant that Hamilton overtook both Button and Webber in the championship standings with six points covering the top three drivers. With McLaren claiming the lead of the Constructors' Championship from Red Bull in Turkey, their maximum points score in Montreal placed them a further twenty-two points clear of the Austrian team.

== Report ==
=== Background ===
After dominating the previous three races, it was widely expected that the Montreal circuit would not play to the Red Bull's strengths, with intense media speculation that the controversial crash between Sebastian Vettel and Mark Webber whilst fighting for the lead of the Turkish Grand Prix would only worsen the team's chances. However, while neither driver was prepared to accept full responsibility for causing the accident, both expressed a desire to forget about it and move on.

None of the teams planned to introduce major updates for the race, though several brought customised packages specifically for the high-speed, low-downforce circuit. Those who had developed an "F-duct" system for the previous race were still running it in the trial phase.

This race was Scuderia Ferrari's 800th start in a World Championship event as a team.

=== Free Practice ===
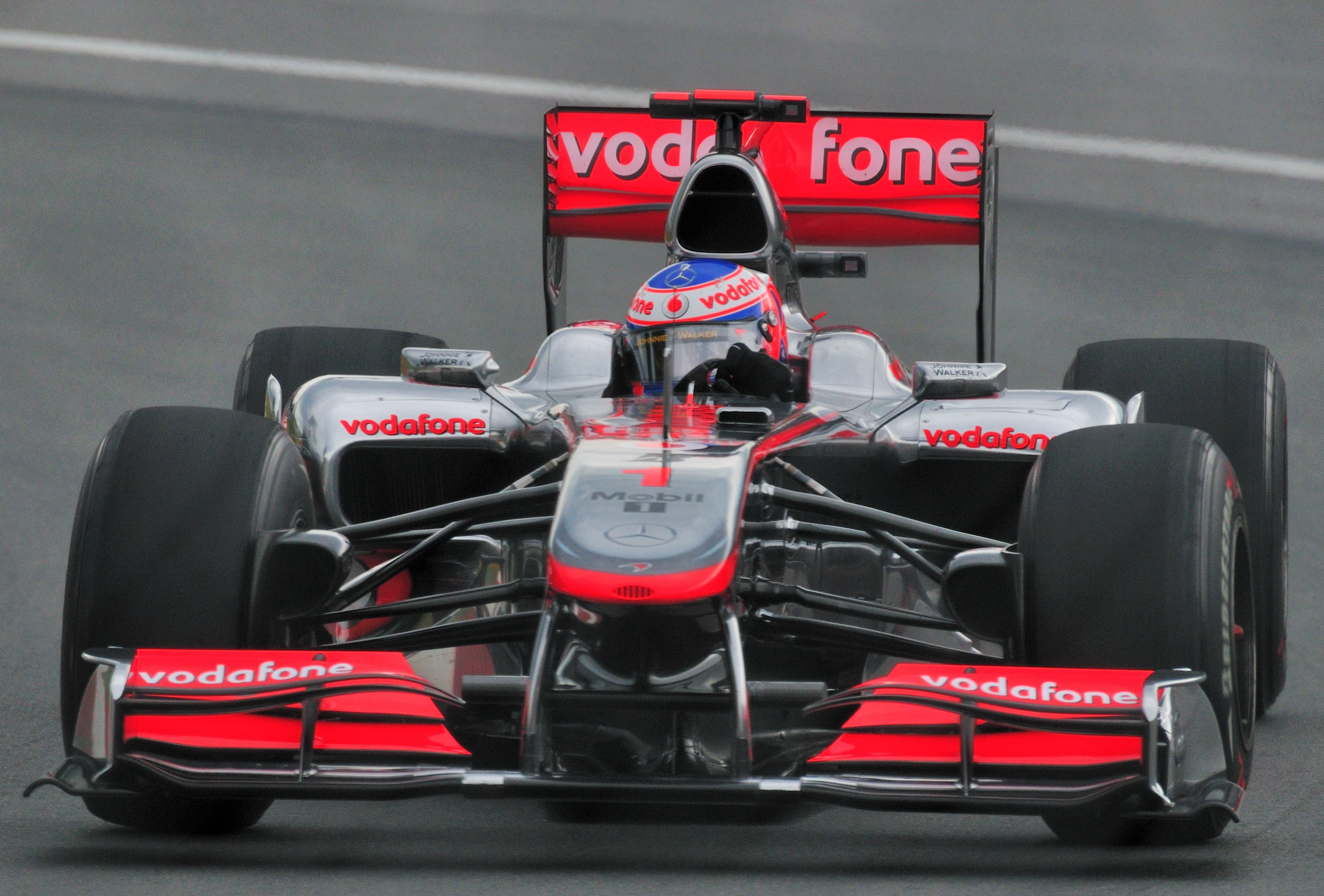
Jenson Button set the fastest time in the first free practice session.

The Friday sessions passed without incident save for minor off-track excursions by several drivers and a spin by Pedro de la Rosa at l'Epingle. Lucas di Grassi was the only driver who failed to set a time in the first session after stopping on the circuit. While reigning World Champion Jenson Button set the fastest time of the first session, Hispania Racing improved dramatically, beating both the Virgins, while Karun Chandhok also beat the Lotus of Jarno Trulli. The session also showed the progress of the new teams as a whole, with Heikki Kovalainen finishing the session just over a second adrift of Jaime Alguersuari; the difference between the new and established teams had been as great as three seconds in the first race of the season. Kovalainen would go on to repeat his feat in the second session, finishing just over half a second behind Alguersuari and a full second ahead of Chandhok, the next-fastest driver.

The biggest story of the day was the extreme tyre degradation the drivers experienced while running on the super-soft compound. Several sections of the circuit had been resurfaced since Formula One's previous visit in 2008, with the net result being that they offered comparatively little grip compared to other circuits. Hirohide Hamashima, Bridgestone's director of motosport tyre development, commented that the problem was a result of the tyres being unable to reach their optimum operating temperature. With several teams expecting rain at some point during the weekend, the lack of grip and unpredictable conditions made setting the car up exceptionally difficult. Sebastian Vettel was the fastest driver in the session, narrowly outclassing the Ferrari of Fernando Alonso and Mercedes' Nico Rosberg. Despite setting the fastest times of the first session, the McLarens both struggled, with Lewis Hamilton finishing seventh and Button only managing eleventh.

McLaren bounded back in time for the third session, with Hamilton comfortably setting the fastest time of both the session and the weekend, ahead of Webber, Alonso and Schumacher. Hamilton was sighted clipping the concrete walls lining the circuit as one point, as did Felipe Massa, but both were able to continue without damage. Pedro de la Rosa very nearly came unstuck at the same point, but Karun Chandhok was less fortunate, his Hispania F110 stopping on the circuit early on. Nico Rosberg was sidelined with a clutch problem for most of the session. The only other incident was Lucas di Grassi losing control under braking at l'Epingle and coming to rest in the gravel trap shortly after he recorded the fastest speed – 324 km/h (201 mph) – through the speed trap.

=== Qualifying ===
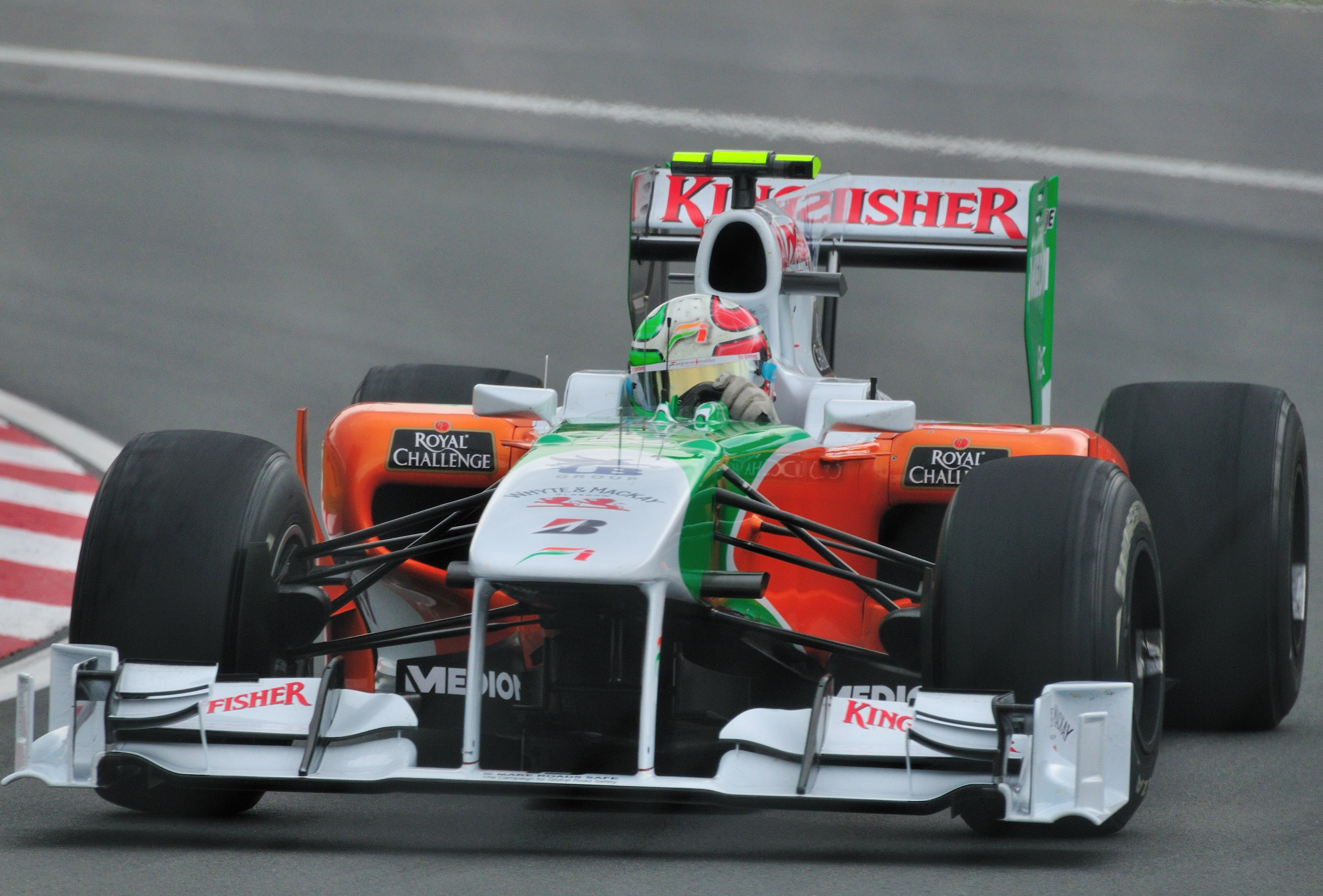
Vitantonio Liuzzi started the race from a career best fifth position.

To compound the problems associated with heavy graining, overnight rain washed away whatever rubber had been laid down on the circuit during the Friday practice sessions, further reducing grip. With ambient temperatures being no higher than on Friday and the forecast predicting more of the same for the race, Bridgestone projected that a one-stop strategy in the race would be impossible with the harder prime compound losing up to seven seconds over half race distance, and the super-soft option tyres losing over sixteen seconds in the same window. With the rules dictating that drivers must start the race on the tyres they set their best qualifying time on, tyre selection for qualifying was therefore crucial.

On Saturday afternoon, qualifying started without rain on the track. The first qualifying session had no surprises when both drivers from HRT, Virgin Racing and Lotus failed to make the cut, they were joined by BMW Sauber pilot Kamui Kobayashi. The second qualifying session saw Michael Schumacher miss the cut as the only surprise elimination. With two more cars setting faster times, Schumacher started the race from thirteenth. Barrichello was the fastest of this group followed by Hülkenberg, Schumacher, Petrov, Buemi, Alguersuari and de la Rosa.

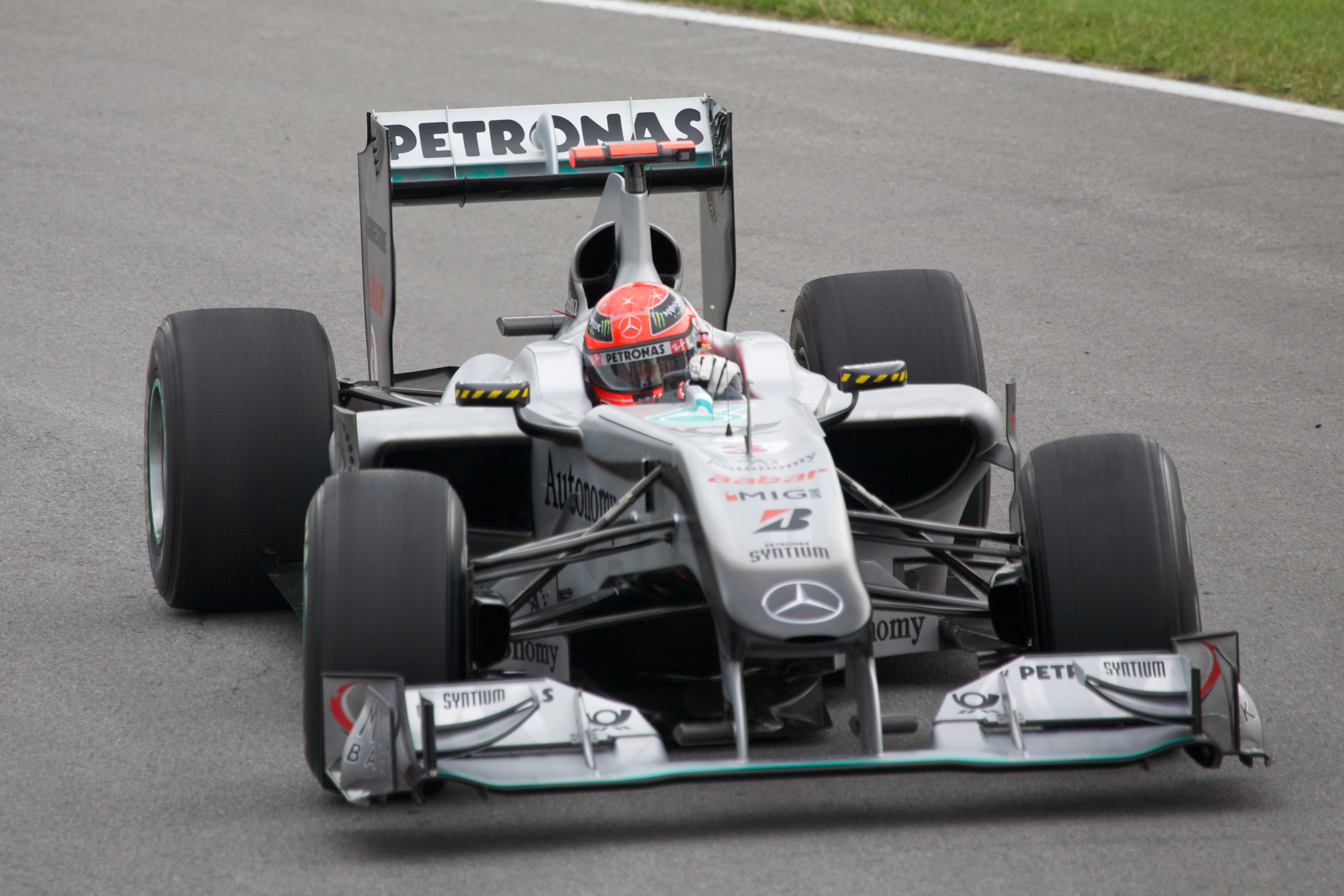
Michael Schumacher qualified in thirteenth position.

At the third and final session all eyes were on Lewis Hamilton as he had set the fastest time in both qualifying sessions. But it was Mark Webber who grabbed the lead early on. The teams were running different tyres, making the results unpredictable. On the very last lap, Hamilton snatched the pole from Webber who could not answer. With Hamilton ending Red Bull's run of pole positions after seven races, Webber was set to start second right in front of his teammate Sebastian Vettel. Fernando Alonso was fourth, Jenson Button fifth followed by Vitantonio Liuzzi, who qualified at a career-best sixth; Felipe Massa, Robert Kubica, Adrian Sutil and Nico Rosberg completed the top ten.

On the cool down lap, Hamilton was instructed by his team to slow down and stop on the circuit because the team realised he would not have enough fuel left in his tank for a sample to be taken by the FIA. Hamilton turned his car off and let it continue rolling down the back straight of the circuit. He undid his belts and sat higher up in the cockpit of his car, relaxed until his McLaren nearly came to a stop. Hamilton then got out and started to push his still rolling car down the back straight. A group of circuit marshalls finally came to help him and he was picked up by the course car and taken to the press conference. The FIA later handed Hamilton a reprimand and fined the McLaren team $10,000 for not completing the cool down lap in the given time, with Hamilton retaining his pole position.

=== Race ===
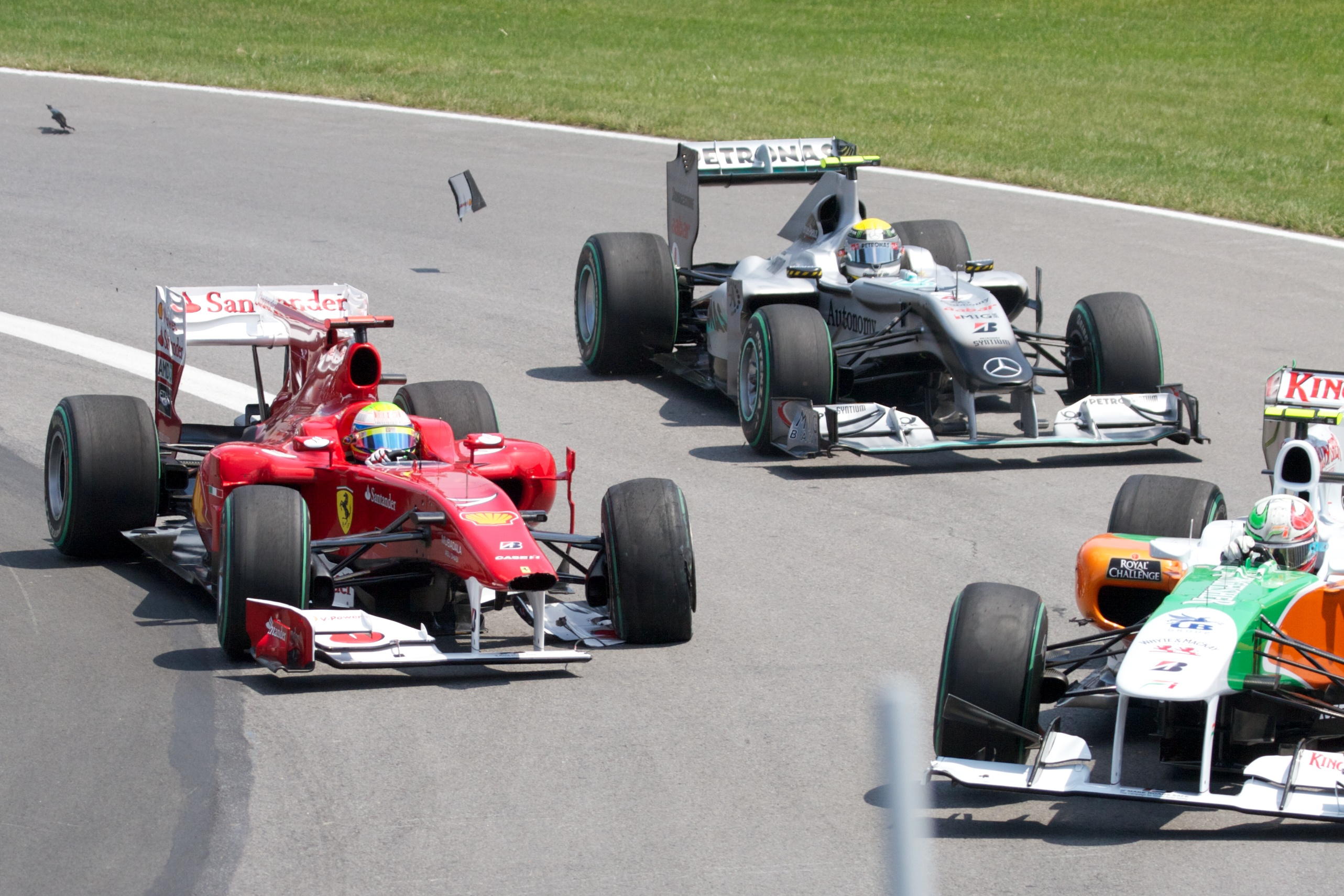
The first lap saw contact between Felipe Massa and Vitantonio Liuzzi.

The race was the first of the season in which all twenty-four cars started on the grid; prior to the Montreal race, at least one car—usually from Virgin, Lotus or Hispania—was forced to start from the pit lane with a mechanical issue of some kind. Mark Webber was demoted from second place on the grid to seventh after Red Bull found iron filings in a sample of oil taken from the gearbox used in Webber's car during qualifying. This finding, which suggested damage to the internals of the gearbox and necessitated a gearbox change under parc ferme conditions, resulted in the five-place grid penalty.

The opening lap saw drama unfold before the field had even cleared the start gantry. While Lewis Hamilton won the drag race to the first corner, in the middle of the pack, Vitaly Petrov jumped the start and was forced onto the grassy verge as he attempted to go around the outside. This resulted in a spin that forced Pedro de la Rosa to take evasive action; Petrov earned two drive-through penalties in the space of one hundred metres for his efforts and spent the rest of the race fighting with the new teams. Felipe Massa and Vitantonio Liuzzi made contact three times in one corner, with the Italian getting spun around in the process and sliding down the order. As Hamilton, Vettel and Alonso established the running order, Kamui Kobayashi and Nico Hülkenberg tangled on the run into the final corners. While the Williams driver cut the chicane to avoid further contact, Kobayashi was not as lucky and he became the Wall of Champions' 2010 victim. He retired a lap later with accident damage. After avoiding the spinning Petrov at the start, Kobayashi's Sauber teammate Pedro de la Rosa joined him on the sidelines shortly thereafter and gave the team the unenviable record of eleven retirements from sixteen starts.

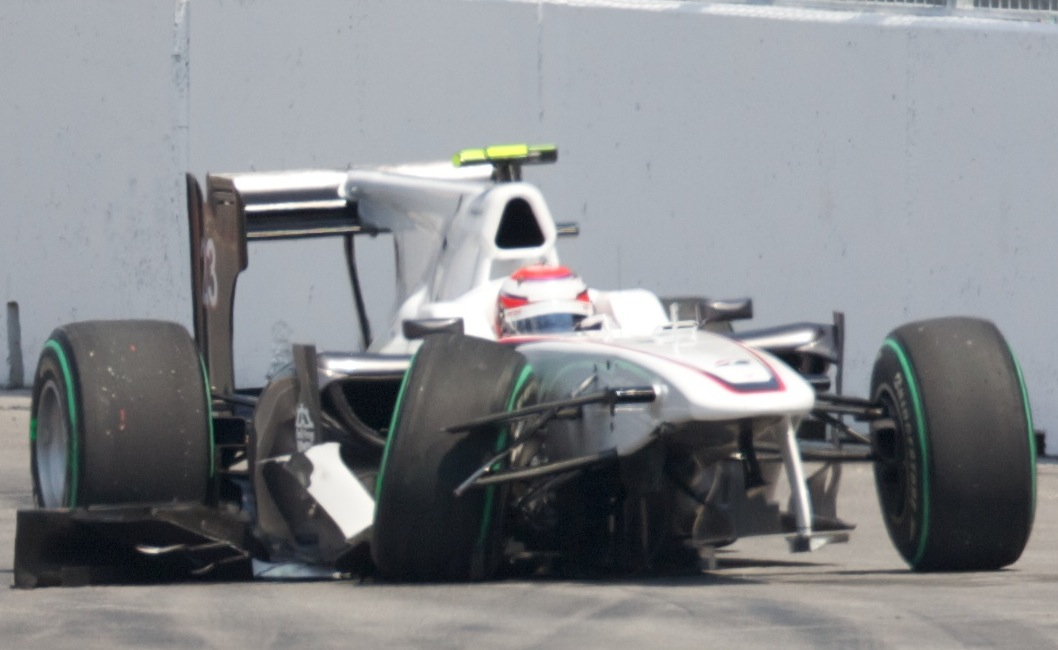
Kamui Kobayashi became another victim of the "Wall of Champions".

The early round of stops passed without incident, although Red Bull elected to run their drivers on separate strategies; Mark Webber ran the harder prime compound back-to-back with a finish on the softer options, while Vettel ran the options in his middle stint and picked up the primes for the run to the finish. Every other driver except Robert Kubica had qualified on and subsequently started the race with the softer options. The tyre lottery produced an unlikely winner with Toro Rosso's Sébastien Buemi inheriting the lead for a lap before his stop, the first time a Toro Rosso had led a race since Sébastien Bourdais led three laps at the 2008 Japanese Grand Prix and was the only lap Buemi would lead in his career. Elsewhere in the field, Hülkenberg proved to be his own worst enemy when he over-extended himself under brakes while attempting to pass Nico Rosberg at l'Epingle and damaging his front wing in the process. He was then flagged for speeding in the pit lane when he pitted to replace the wing, robbing himself of a potential points place as he was forced to serve a drive-through penalty.

An accident between Michael Schumacher and Robert Kubica was narrowly avoided as Schumacher emerged from the first of his scheduled stops. Schumacher refused to yield on the approach to the fourth corner and the two took a short trip across the grassy verge. The altercation damaged Kubica's undertray while the incident was investigated by the stewards. It was the first of many incidents involving Schumacher, with the Mercedes driver later tangling with Adrian Sutil and Felipe Massa. Massa's race was marked by a perpetual battle with the Force India drivers including several near-misses in the second corner, the scene of his first-lap tangle with Liuzzi. Massa would later force his way past Sutil as the two closed in on the Lotus of Heikki Kovalainen, the cars running three-abreast into turn six. His late altercation with former Ferrari teammate Schumacher required him to pit for a replacement front wing and, like Hülkenberg before him, the Brazilian driver was cited for speeding in the pit lane. Twenty seconds were added to his time after the race as punishment.

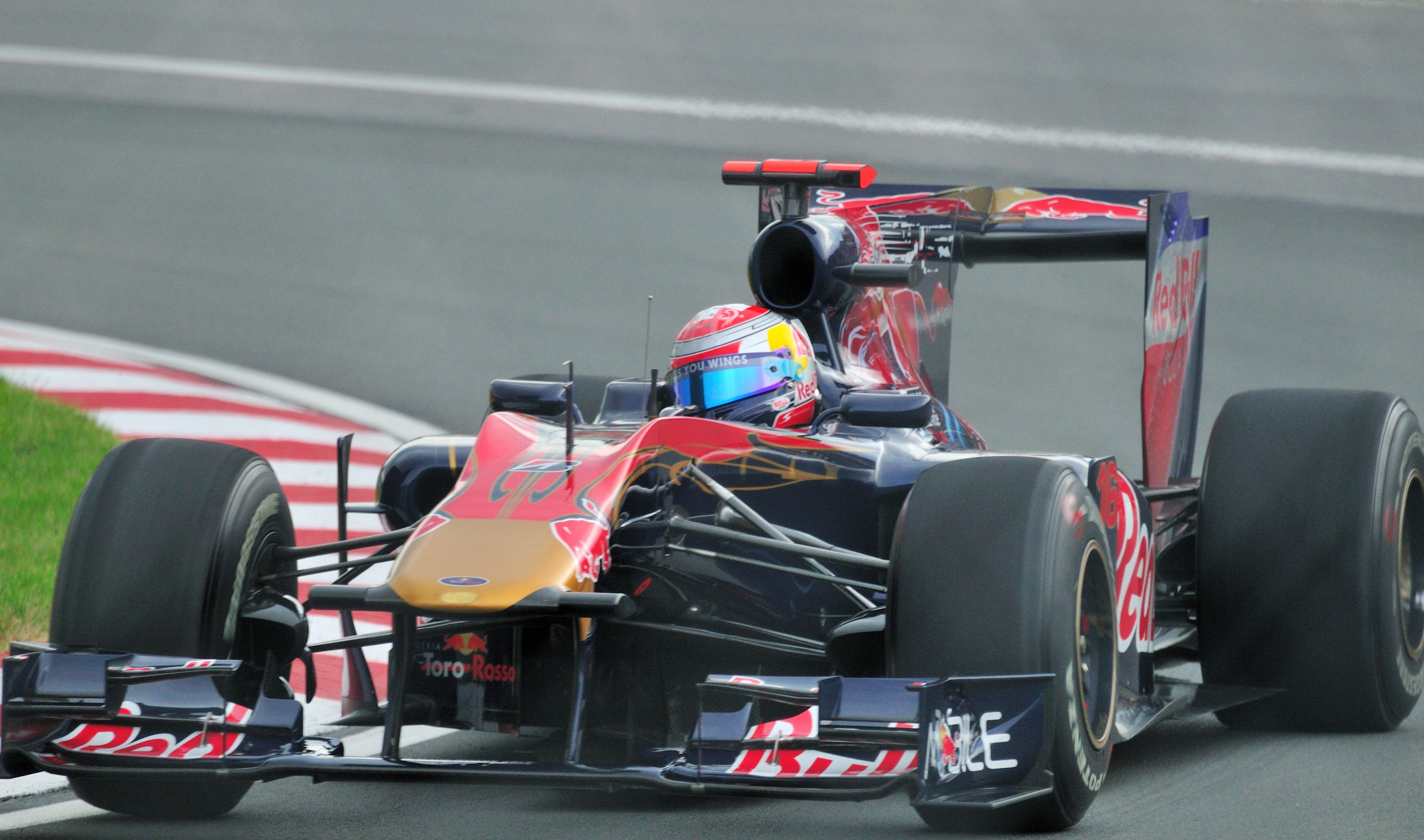
Sébastien Buemi led a race for the first time in his career.

Webber's tyre strategy initially paid off but, as the race wore on, his tyres began to deteriorate rapidly. Hamilton, running second at the time, quickly reduced the Australian's lead and caught him with twenty laps to go, dragging the Ferrari of Alonso through in the process. Webber eventually pitted, emerging behind teammate Vettel in fifth place as Vettel struggled with an unspecified but serious problem that he had to nurse to the finish; the team later clarified this as being related to the gearbox. As Hamilton settled back into the lead, reigning World Champion Jenson Button took Alonso by surprise, passing him around the back half of the circuit and positioning McLaren for their second consecutive one-two finish. Button briefly attempted a run at his teammate, narrowing Hamilton's lead to just two seconds with ten laps to go, but Hamilton responded with a fast lap that dissuaded Button from making further attempts. The top five—Hamilton, Button, Alonso, Vettel and Webber—would remain in place until the very end with Vettel stopping on the circuit just after he crossed the finish line at the end of the race. Nico Rosberg fended off a late surge from Kubica to claim sixth while Buemi finished eighth and a lap down. Liuzzi and Sutil both found their way past Schumacher on the final lap—in Sutil's case this was in the final corner—as the Mercedes driver struggled with tyres that were almost completely out of grip and leaving the seven-time World Champion scoreless in what BBC commentator Martin Brundle later described as the German's "worst weekend of his career". Kovalainen was the best of the new teams, two laps down and fighting off Petrov for the final phase of the race, while Karun Chandhok and Lucas di Grassi were the final cars home, four and five laps down respectively.

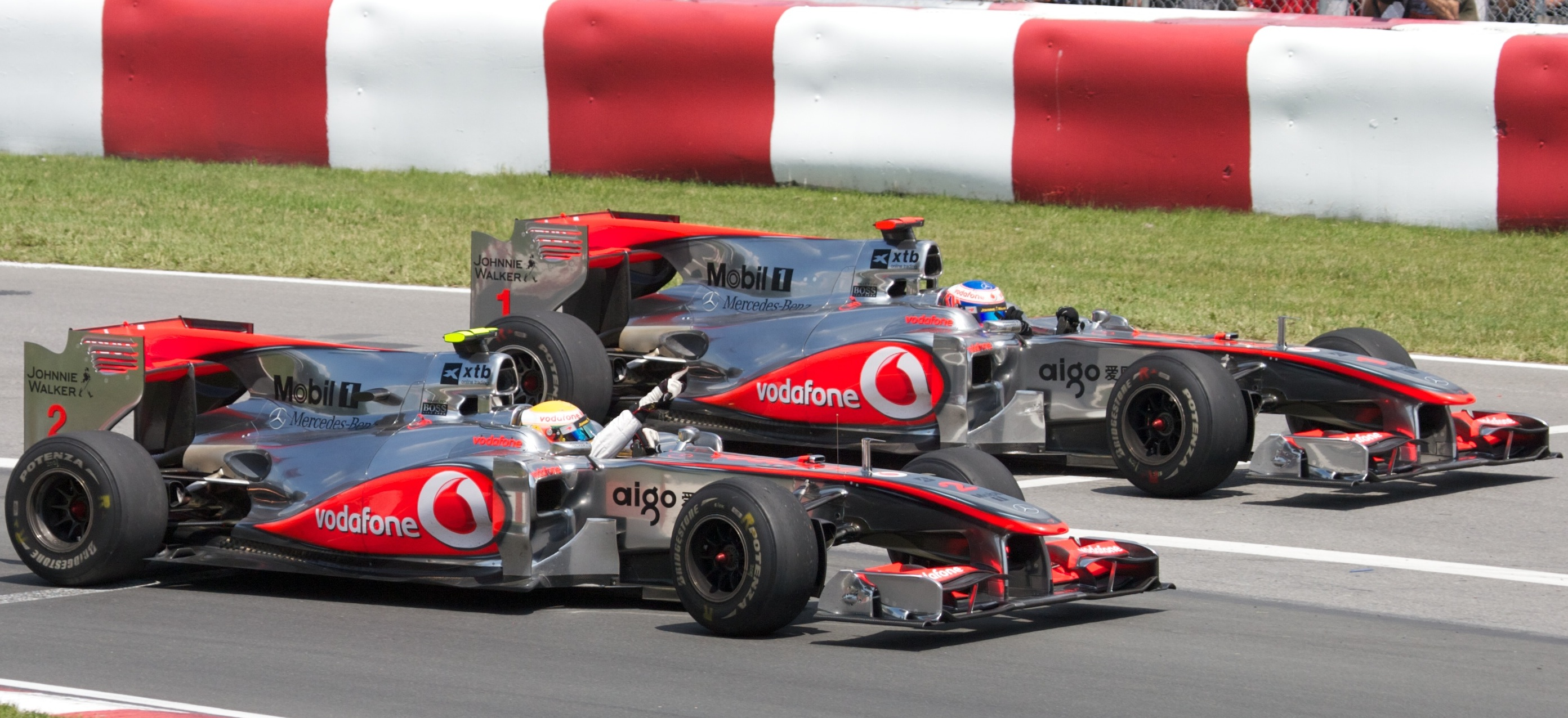
McLaren scored their third 1–2 of the season.

The race was notably short of attrition compared to previous races at the Circuit Gilles Villeneuve, which have seen the safety car deployed so often that teams factor an accident into their strategies. However, the 2010 race was so short of retirements that it boasted the greatest number of finishers in the season to date with nineteen classified drivers. In addition to the dual retirements for BMW Sauber, Bruno Senna was once again the victim of a gearbox problem while Jarno Trulli stopped in the pit entry on lap forty-seven with terminal brake problems. Timo Glock retired due to a steering rack leak that crippled his VR-01 on lap fifty-five.

== Classification ==
=== Qualifying ===
Pos	No	Driver	Constructor	Part 1	Part 2	Part 3	Grid
1	2	(United Kingdom) Lewis Hamilton	McLaren-Mercedes	1:15.889	1:15.528	1:15.105	1
2	6	(Australia) Mark Webber	Red Bull-Renault	1:16.423	1:15.692	1:15.373	7^{1}
3	5	(Germany) Sebastian Vettel	Red Bull-Renault	1:16.129	1:15.556	1:15.420	2
4	8	(Spain) Fernando Alonso	Ferrari	1:16.171	1:15.597	1:15.435	3
5	1	(United Kingdom) Jenson Button	McLaren-Mercedes	1:16.371	1:15.742	1:15.520	4
6	15	(Italy) Vitantonio Liuzzi	Force India-Mercedes	1:17.086	1:16.171	1:15.648	5
7	7	(Brazil) Felipe Massa	Ferrari	1:16.673	1:16.314	1:15.688	6
8	11	(Poland) Robert Kubica	Renault	1:16.370	1:15.682	1:15.715	8
9	14	(Germany) Adrian Sutil	Force India-Mercedes	1:16.495	1:16.295	1:15.881	9
10	4	(Germany) Nico Rosberg	Mercedes	1:16.350	1:16.001	1:16.071	10
11	9	(Brazil) Rubens Barrichello	Williams-Cosworth	1:16.880	1:16.434		11
12	10	(Germany) Nico Hülkenberg	Williams-Cosworth	1:16.770	1:16.438		12
13	3	(Germany) Michael Schumacher	Mercedes	1:16.598	1:16.492		13
14	12	(Russia) Vitaly Petrov	Renault	1:16.569	1:16.844		14
15	16	(Switzerland) Sébastien Buemi	Toro Rosso-Ferrari	1:17.356	1:16.928		15
16	17	(Spain) Jaime Alguersuari	Toro Rosso-Ferrari	1:17.027	1:17.029		16
17	22	(Spain) Pedro de la Rosa	BMW Sauber-Ferrari	1:17.611	1:17.384		17
18	23	(Japan) Kamui Kobayashi	BMW Sauber-Ferrari	1:18.019			18
19	19	(Finland) Heikki Kovalainen	Lotus-Cosworth	1:18.237			19
20	18	(Italy) Jarno Trulli	Lotus-Cosworth	1:18.698			20
21	24	(Germany) Timo Glock	Virgin-Cosworth	1:18.941			21
22	21	(Brazil) Bruno Senna	HRT-Cosworth	1:19.484			22
23	25	(Brazil) Lucas di Grassi	Virgin-Cosworth	1:19.675			23
24	20	(India) Karun Chandhok	HRT-Cosworth	1:27.757			24^{2}

Notes:

1. – Mark Webber was demoted five places on the grid after the gearbox in his car was changed pre-race.
2. – Karun Chandhok was given a five place penalty after the gearbox in his car was changed overnight. It did not affect his starting position.

=== Race ===
Pos	No	Driver	Constructor	Laps	Time/Retired	Grid	Points
1	2	(United Kingdom) Lewis Hamilton	McLaren-Mercedes	70	1:33:53.456	1	25
2	1	(United Kingdom) Jenson Button	McLaren-Mercedes	70	+2.254	4	18
3	8	(Spain) Fernando Alonso	Ferrari	70	+9.214	3	15
4	5	(Germany) Sebastian Vettel	Red Bull-Renault	70	+37.817	2	12
5	6	(Australia) Mark Webber	Red Bull-Renault	70	+39.291	7	10
6	4	(Germany) Nico Rosberg	Mercedes	70	+56.084	10	8
7	11	(Poland) Robert Kubica	Renault	70	+57.300	8	6
8	16	(Switzerland) Sébastien Buemi	Toro Rosso-Ferrari	69	+1 Lap	15	4
9	15	(Italy) Vitantonio Liuzzi	Force India-Mercedes	69	+1 Lap	5	2
10	14	(Germany) Adrian Sutil	Force India-Mercedes	69	+1 Lap	9	1
11	3	(Germany) Michael Schumacher	Mercedes	69	+1 Lap	13	
12	17	(Spain) Jaime Alguersuari	Toro Rosso-Ferrari	69	+1 Lap	16	
13	10	(Germany) Nico Hülkenberg	Williams-Cosworth	69	+1 Lap	12	
14	9	(Brazil) Rubens Barrichello	Williams-Cosworth	69	+1 Lap	11	
15	7	(Brazil) Felipe Massa	Ferrari	69	+1 Lap^{1}	6	
16	19	(Finland) Heikki Kovalainen	Lotus-Cosworth	68	+2 Laps	19	
17	12	(Russia) Vitaly Petrov	Renault	68	+2 Laps	14	
18	20	(India) Karun Chandhok	HRT-Cosworth	66	+4 Laps	24	
19	25	(Brazil) Lucas di Grassi	Virgin-Cosworth	65	+5 Laps	23	
Ret	24	(Germany) Timo Glock	Virgin-Cosworth	50	Steering	21	
Ret	18	(Italy) Jarno Trulli	Lotus-Cosworth	42	Vibration	20	
Ret	22	(Spain) Pedro de la Rosa	BMW Sauber-Ferrari	30	Engine	17	
Ret	21	(Brazil) Bruno Senna	HRT-Cosworth	13	Gearbox	22	
Ret	23	(Japan) Kamui Kobayashi	BMW Sauber-Ferrari	1	Accident	18	

Notes

1. – Felipe Massa was given a 20-second time penalty post-race for exceeding the pit lane speed limit in the closing stages of the race. However, as Massa finished one lap down and one lap clear of the next-placed car, the penalty did not affect his finishing position.

== Championship standings after the race ==
Drivers' Championship standings

	Pos.	Driver	Points
2	1	(United Kingdom) Lewis Hamilton	109
	2	(United Kingdom) Jenson Button	106
2	3	(Australia) Mark Webber	103
	4	(Spain) Fernando Alonso	94
	5	(Germany) Sebastian Vettel	90

Constructors' Championship standings

Pos.	Constructor	Points
1	(United Kingdom) McLaren-Mercedes	215
2	(Austria) Red Bull-Renault	193
3	(Italy) Ferrari	161
4	(Germany) Mercedes	108
5	(France) Renault	79

- Note: Only the top five positions are included for both sets of standings.

Previous race: 2010 Turkish Grand Prix	FIA Formula One World Championship; 2010 season	Next race: 2010 European Grand Prix
Previous race: 2008 Canadian Grand Prix	Canadian Grand Prix	Next race: 2011 Canadian Grand Prix
