= Peter Ryan (racing driver) =

Canadian racing driver (1940–1962)

- Born: 10 June 1940; Philadelphia, Pennsylvania, U.S.
- Died: 2 July 1962 (aged 22); Paris, France

Formula One World Championship career
- Nationality: (Canada) Canadian
- Active years: 1961
- Team: non-works Lotus
- Entries: 1
- Championships: 0
- Wins: 0
- Podiums: 0
- Career points: 0
- Pole positions: 0
- Fastest laps: 0
- First entry: 1961 United States Grand Prix

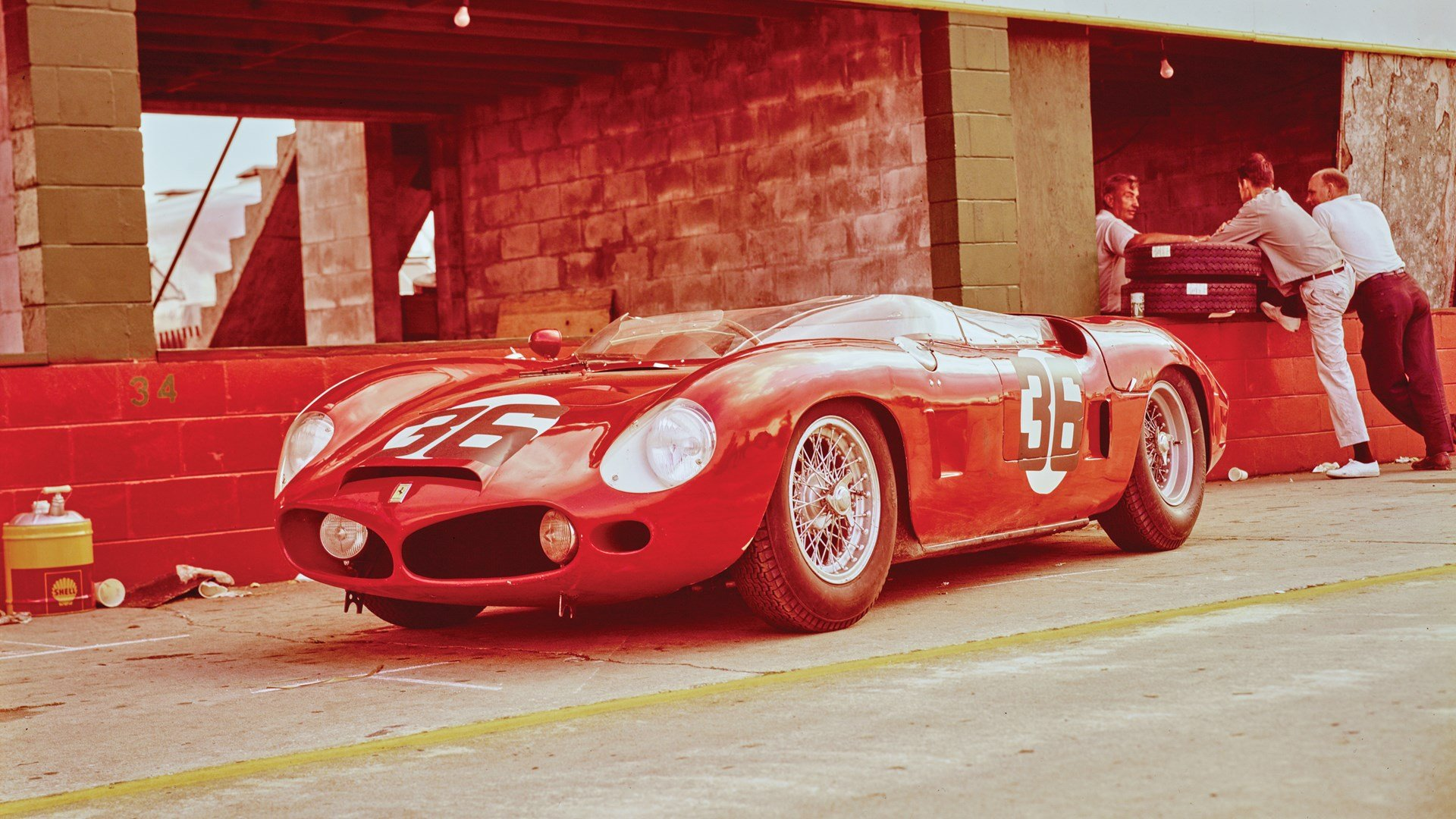
1962 Ferrari 248 SP driven by Peter Ryan and Bob Fulp at Sebring (USA) in March 1962

Peter Barry Ryan (10 June 1940 – 2 July 1962) was an American-born Canadian racecar driver from Mont-Tremblant, Quebec. He had a short Formula One career. He participated in one Grand Prix, the 1961 United States Grand Prix at Watkins Glen, finishing ninth. He scored no championship points. However, he became the first Canadian ever to take part in a Formula One Grand Prix.

== Career ==
Ryan first came to prominence as a skier, winning the National Ski Association's junior downhill championship at Mount Rose, Nevada, in 1957. "Immediately after Ryan's victory, Americans protested that Canadians could not win an American championship." The protest was disallowed. His Olympic prospects were such that a dispute arose as to which country he should represent. The Americans asserted that he: "was born in the United States as were his father, the late Joseph P. Ryan, and his mother." Ryan expressed a preference for the Canadian team: "But while he would like to ski for Canada, he wouldn't care to give up his American citizenship." "An outstanding skier, Ryan shifted to auto racing in 1959 after a ski crackup in which both his legs were broken."

On 25 April 1959, Denise McCluggage, writing in Competition Press, reported: "Peter Ryan of the Mont Tremblant Ryans bought Bernie Vihl's beautifully kept old 550 Porsche in which to take up racing-sports car racing that is. Peter at 19, is an old hand at ski racing being a downhill expert." Ryan's successes came in sports cars racing in Canada, the US and Nassau. On 1 October 1960, Ryan co-drove with Roger Penske in a Porsche RS60 to win the six-hour Sundown Grand Prix at Harewood, in Ontario, Canada. The next week Ryan was entered in the 230-mile Formula Libre road race at Watkins Glen, New York. In qualifying he was "the surprise of the day, taking the fifth position over England's Roy Salvadori." Ahead of him were Stirling Moss, Jack Brabham, Joakim Bonnier and Olivier Gendebien. He was driving Bill Sadler's Formula Libre special, known as "Formula Ferocious," a rear-engined single-seater device, when his motor blew on lap 56.

At Sebring on 25 March 1961, Ryan, teamed with Frances Bradley and Ludwig Heimrath, finished eighth overall in the Florida International 12-Hour Grand Prix of Endurance, driving a Porsche RS. In June 1961 Ryan withdrew from a race at Mosport. He "was expected to give Moss his stiffest competition, but did not compete. He withdrew at the last minute. Ryan, a member of the Sports Car Club of America, feared he would lose his amateur status in the United States if he entered the race. The S.C.C.A. ordered its members not to compete in the Canadian race because prize money was being given." In July 1961, Ryan (Comstock Sadler-Chevrolet) was leading the Meadowdale Grand Prix when Roger Penske (Maserati birdcage Telar Special): "banged into him from the rear on the 18th lap." Ryan clung on to the lead, but after spinning recovered to finish second. On 6 August 1961, Ryan won the Vanderbilt Cup for Formula Junior cars at Bridgehampton, New York, driving a Lotus 20, averaging 87.95 miles an hour.

Ryan was the winner of the inaugural Canadian Grand Prix, in a Lotus Monte Carlo-Climax, held at Mosport on 30 September 1961, when it was a non-Championship sports car race. Second that day was Pedro Rodríguez (Ferrari V12) and third Stirling Moss (Lotus Monte Carlo). The win at Mosport led to an invitation from Colin Chapman to drive a Lotus in the 1961 United States Grand Prix.

In the first 3-hr Daytona Continental GT and sports car race at Daytona on 11 February 1962, Ryan finished 15th overall, sharing a Ferrari 3.0-litre with Ricardo Rodríguez. The previous day he had finished fifth in the Lurani Trophy Race for Formula Junior cars, driving a Lotus 20. At Sebring on 24 March 1962, Ryan, teamed with John Fulp, finished thirteenth overall in the Florida International 12-Hour Grand Prix of Endurance, driving a Ferrari 248 SP for the North American Racing Team.

An offer of a factory-Lotus Formula Junior drive in Europe for 1962 did not materialise: "The young Canadian-American, bitterly disappointed, has gone to England to see what arrangements can be made for the coming season." "Placed under a three-year contract by Team Lotus he was lent to the Ian Walker Racing Team for the 1962 season,.." On 27 May 1962, Ryan was teamed with Paul Hawkins in an Ian Walker Racing Team Lotus 23 at the Nurburgring 1,000 km sports car race. The car suffered from overheating and was unplaced. At Monaco on 2 June 1962, Ryan won a heat race in an FJ Lotus, finishing eleventh in the final. Denis Jenkinson commented: "The driving of Ryan, the Canadian, and Spence, both in Ian Walker Lotus-Juniors, was very impressive,.." At Mallory Park, England, on 11 June 1962, Ryan drove an FJ Lotus: "The Formula Junior event saw Peter Ryan adding to his growing reputation in Europe by tailing Peter Arundell's works Lotus for the whole race, then nipping through on lap 28 to win by a second."

Ryan made his Le Mans debut on 23 and 24 June 1962, partnered by John 'Buck' Fulp, driving the #18 NART Ferrari 250 TRI/61. The car completed 150 laps and 15 hours when it was crashed by Ryan. "Poor Peter Ryan put his Ferrari in the sandbank at Mulsanne and dug for ages before giving up,.."

Ryan's last race was in the Coupe Internationale des Juniors Formula Junior race at Reims, on 2 July 1962. "First of the heats, run at 10 a.m. round an almost deserted circuit, began as a terrific scrap between Peter Ryan's Ian Walker Lotus, Bill Moss's Gemini, Gardner's Brabham with Love's Cooper and Arundell's Lotus lurking just behind. This struggle continued until the fifth lap, when Ryan's Lotus and Bill Moss's Gemini touched as they left the very fast right-hand bend past Gueux. Both cars left the road at high speed and were totally wrecked; Bill Moss escaped with minor injuries but Ryan was taken to hospital seriously hurt." He succumbed to his injuries in a Paris hospital where he was taken following the accident.

Peter Garnier, writing in Autocar, said of Peter Ryan: "During his all too-brief-spell on British and Continental circuits, he had proved himself to be extremely skilful and fast, with just that touch of fire which can often indicate the makings of a great driver."

Ryan was inducted into the Canadian Motorsport Hall of Fame as one of the initial inductees in 1993.

== Complete Formula One results ==
(key)

Year	Entrant	Chassis	Engine	1	2	3	4	5	6	7	8	WDC	Points
1961	J Wheeler Autosport	Lotus 18/21	Climax Straight-4	MON	NED	BEL	FRA	GBR	GER	ITA	USA; 9	NC	0

== Bibliography ==
- David Charters, Chequered Pasts: Sports Car Racing and Rallying in Canada, 1951-1991, University of Toronto Press, Scholarly Publishing Division, 2007.
