= Motorsport Club of Ottawa =

The Motorsport Club of Ottawa (MCO) is a car club in Ottawa, Canada

It was created in 1949 as the Ottawa Light Car Club for ex-service members who had purchased cars in Europe and needed to figure out how to do maintenance on them.

It is governed by the Canadian Automobile Sport Clubs - Ontario Region (CASC-OR). Club members participate in all levels of motorsports, including autocross, Solo Sprints, road and oval racing, TSD and performance rallies, karting, officiating and marshalling. Members have competed at the local, regional, national, and international level.

Members have include General Lewis MacKenzie.
