= Borrani =

Italian wheel manufacturer

- Industry: Automotive industry
- Founded: Milan (1922)
- Founder: Carlo Borrani
- Headquarters: Milan, Italy
- Area served: Worldwide
- Products: Wire wheels
- Website: www.ruoteborrani.com

Ruote Borrani S.p.A. (established 1922 in Milan) is an Italian manufacturer of automobile and motorcycle wheels. They are known for supplying Rudge-Whitworth design centerlocking wire wheels to many Italian racing cars, sports cars and luxury cars.

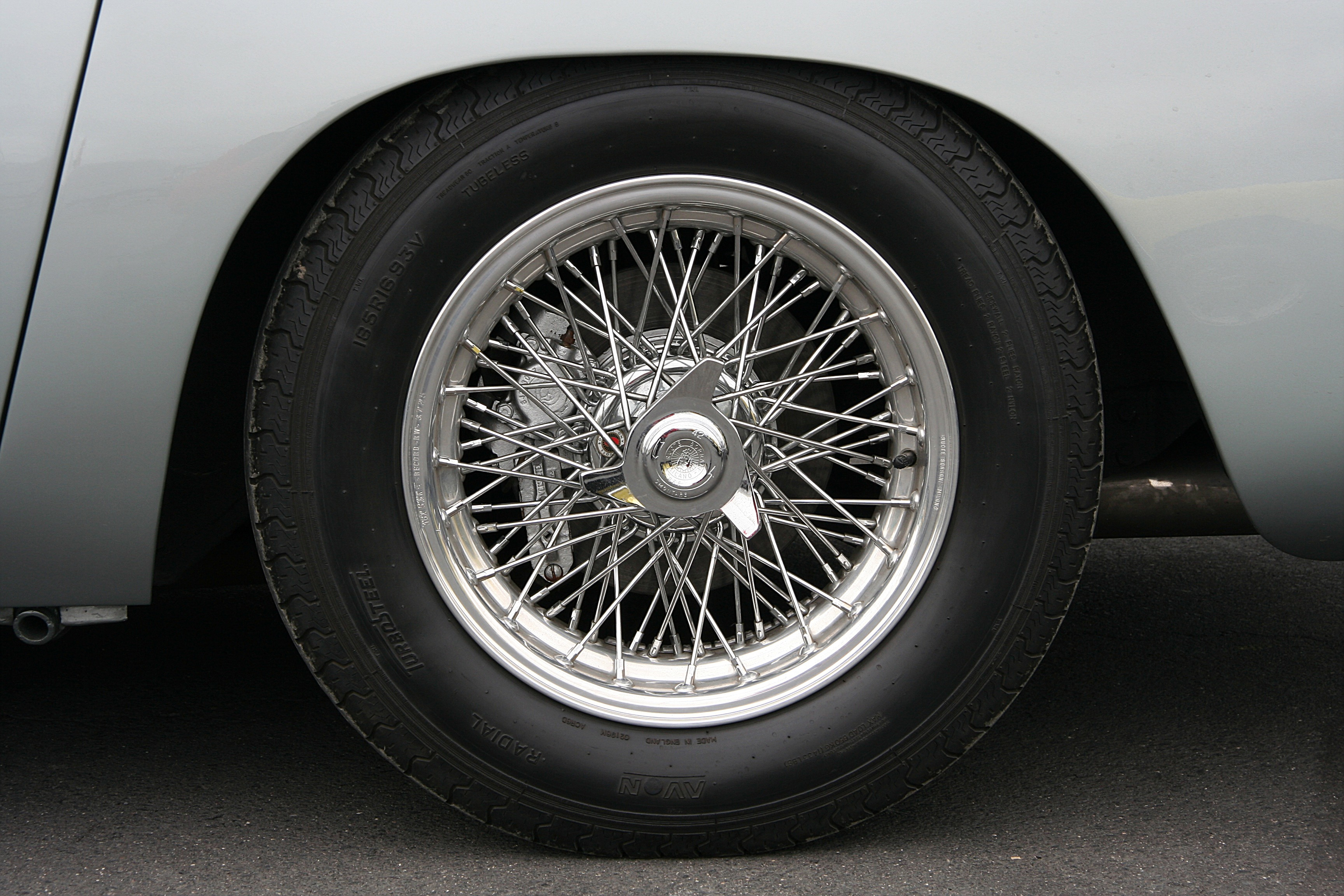
Borrani wheel on an Aston Martin DB4

== History ==
The company was initially named Rudge-Whitworth Milano, as the splined centerlock hub mechanism was licensed from the Coventry-based Rudge-Whitworth, which had developed the patents since 1908. It was run by Carlo Borrani at Via Ugo Bassi 9, and quickly became supplier for Alfa Romeo, Bianchi, Lancia and other racing cars, used by such drivers as Enzo Ferrari when winning the first Coppa Acerbo in Pescara (1924). Borrani wheels used aluminum alloy rims instead of steel, improving unsprung mass and thus overall performance compared to the original Rudge-Whitworth design. Leadership transferred to the founder's son, Cesare Borrani, in 1937.

The company name was changed to Ruote Borrani S.p.A. in the 1930s, due to Benito Mussolini's campaign to remove English loanwords from the Italian language. Around this time the company also began manufacturing aluminum (non-wire) wheels to replace steel wheels. These bimetal cast-aluminum wheels were standard on Maserati 3500.

Between 1946 and 1966, all Ferrari cars were equipped with Borrani wheels as original equipment. The two businesses thus share an important part of Italian automotive history, both on the road and on the race tracks. Afterwards, Borrani wheels remained a major option for Ferrari owners until as late as 1984. Borrani wheels also were original equipment on famous makes like Lamborghini, Alfa Romeo, Maserati, Facel Vega and Aston Martin.

In 1955, the company relocated to Baranzate in north-west Milan and merged with Costruzioni Meccaniche Rho S.p.A. At this time, 1/10 of the annual volume of about 1,500 wheels were for Ferrari racing cars. Motorcycle wheels for makes such as Moto-Guzzi were also produced. Borrani wire wheels were equipped on some prototype and halo cars such as the 1953 Buick Skylark.

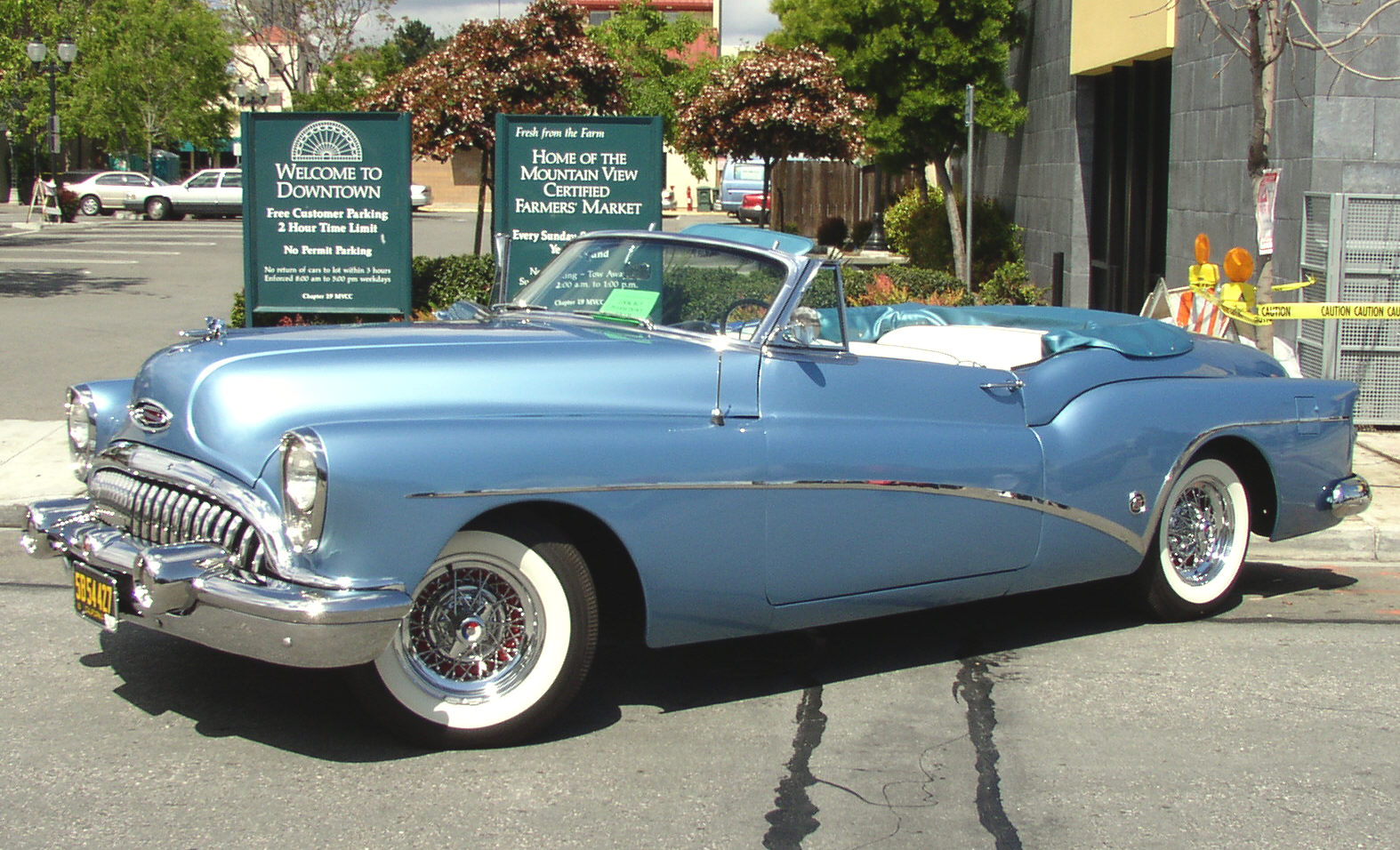
1953 Buick Skylark

In 2004, the Borrani wire wheel production was sold to RuoteMilano srl., member of the international automotive Zeta Europe BV group. The activities were moved to Rozzano on the southern edge of Milan. At these new facilities, the traditional production machines were rebuilt and refurbished to meet modern requirements, and to safeguard the quality and production capacity for Borrani wire wheels. Since then, the total product range has become readily available again and a number of models have been re-entered in production.

== See also ==
=== Related articles ===
- List of Italian companies

=== External links ===
- Official website
- Distributor website
