= Charles Pugh (disambiguation) =

Charles Pugh may refer to:

- Charles Pugh (born 1971), American television journalist, radio personality, and politician
- Charles C. Pugh (born 1940), American mathematician
- Charles Henry Pugh (1840–1901), founder of a British bicycle manufacturer
- Charlie Pugh (1896–1951), Welsh international rugby union player
- Reverend Charles Pugh, baptist minister after whom Pughsville in Florida is named

== See also ==
- Pugh, a surname
