= Centerlock wheel =

Automobile wheel fastened by a single, central nut

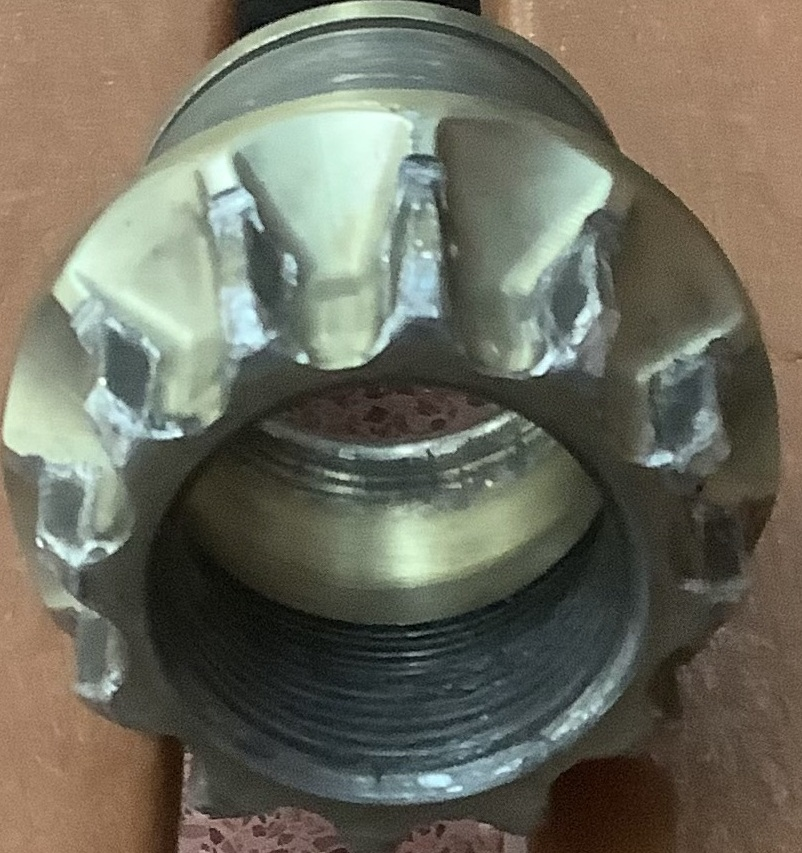
A lugnut off a race car

A centerlock wheel is a type of automobile wheel in which the wheel is fastened to the axle using a single, central nut, instead of the more common ring of 4 or 5 lug nuts or bolts. It is mostly used in racing and high end sports cars.

== History ==
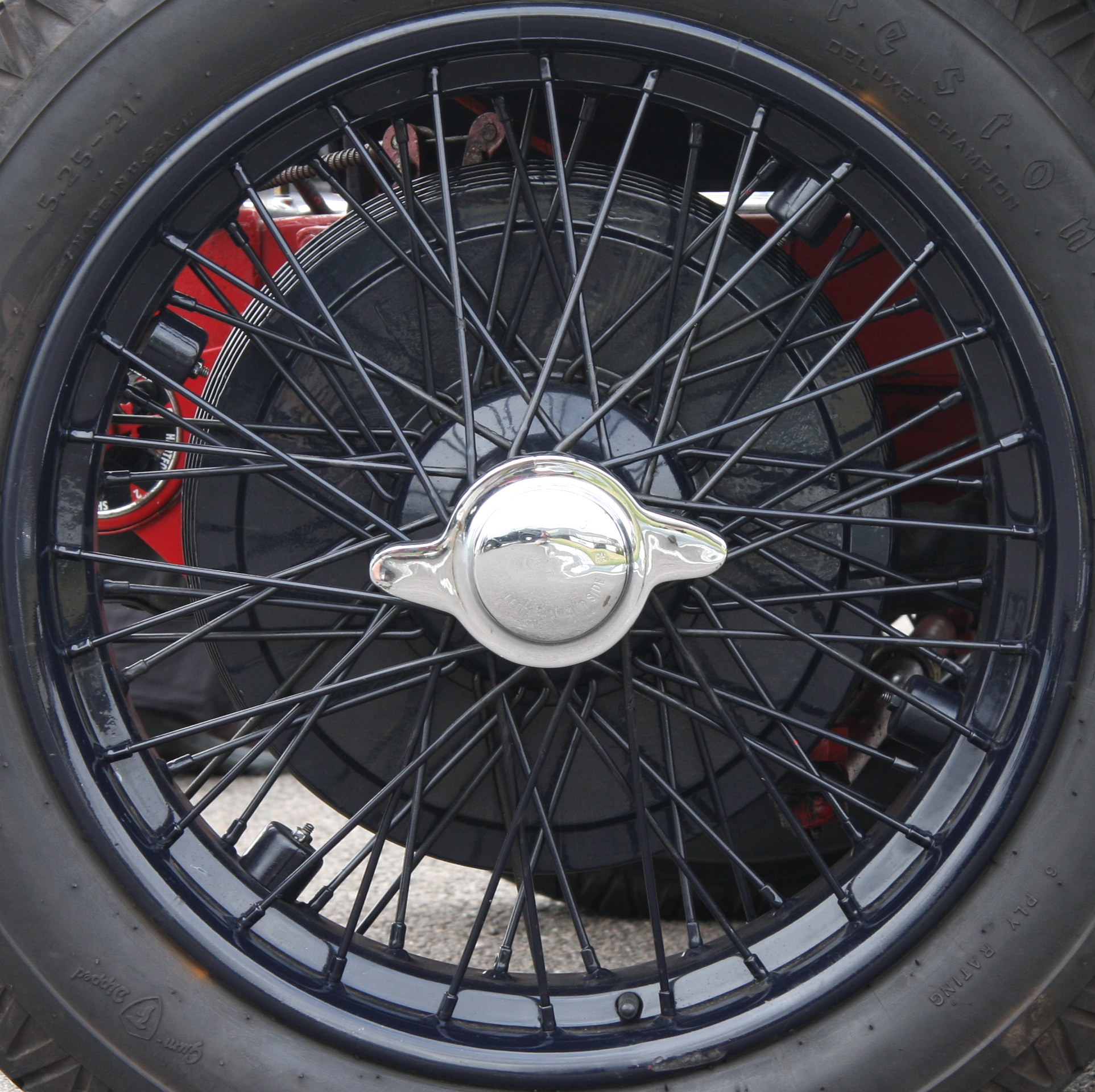
Rudge-Whitworth wire wheel and knock-off nut on a 1922 Vauxhall 25

The centerlock wheel and hub system was first introduced by Rudge-Whitworth in the early 1900s, for use in automobile wire wheels. Initially called "QD" (for "quickly disconnectable") the basic mechanism for "knock-off" style centerlock hubs was patented by 1908. It was quickly adopted by auto manufacturers and racers. Although Rudge-Whitworth knock off hubs were excluded from the 1908 French Grand Prix due to safety concerns, by 1913 the technology was universally used in Grand Prix automobile racing.

In 1922, Carlo Borrani licensed the Rudge-Whitworth "knock off" wheel and hub design and started his own company to manufacture them. This company was initially named Rudge-Whitworth Milano, then in the late 1930s was renamed to Carlo Borrani, S.p.A. Borrani wire wheels further popularized the knock off wheel/hub design and were seen in many successful racing and road cars. Their design used aluminum alloy rims instead of steel, improving unsprung mass and thus overall performance. Early customers for Borrani wheels included Alfa Romeo, Isotta Fraschini, Fiat, Lancia, Porsche, Mercedes-Benz and Auto Union. In the post-war period, these wheels were also fitted to many Ferrari road and racing cars, among other makes.

In the late 1960s, road car safety regulations in the United States and West Germany led to the removal of the distinctive wings or "ears" from knock-off hub nuts. Some manufacturers retained the same internal design based on the Rudge-Whitworth pattern but instead using a hex nut for fastening. Road car design gradually moved away from centerlock hubs towards 4, 5 or 6-lug nut wheel fastening systems.

Centerlock wheels and hubs continued to be used for racing cars, although the mechanical details of the design gradually changed from the original Rudge-Whitworth pattern. Formula One, sports car racing, NASCAR (Cup Series seventh-generation car, from 2022 onwards) and many other types of racing use a form of centerlock hub. Compared to lug nuts, centerlock wheels and hubs are better suited for racing because they can be removed and attached faster during pit stops, allow hub designs with more space for large brake discs and have greater strength when properly installed. Due to the centerlock's continued association with racing and high performance, some automobile manufacturers and tuners install centerlock wheel and hub systems on road-going sports cars.

Evolution of centerlock wheels, as used on Ferrari models from 1960-2010
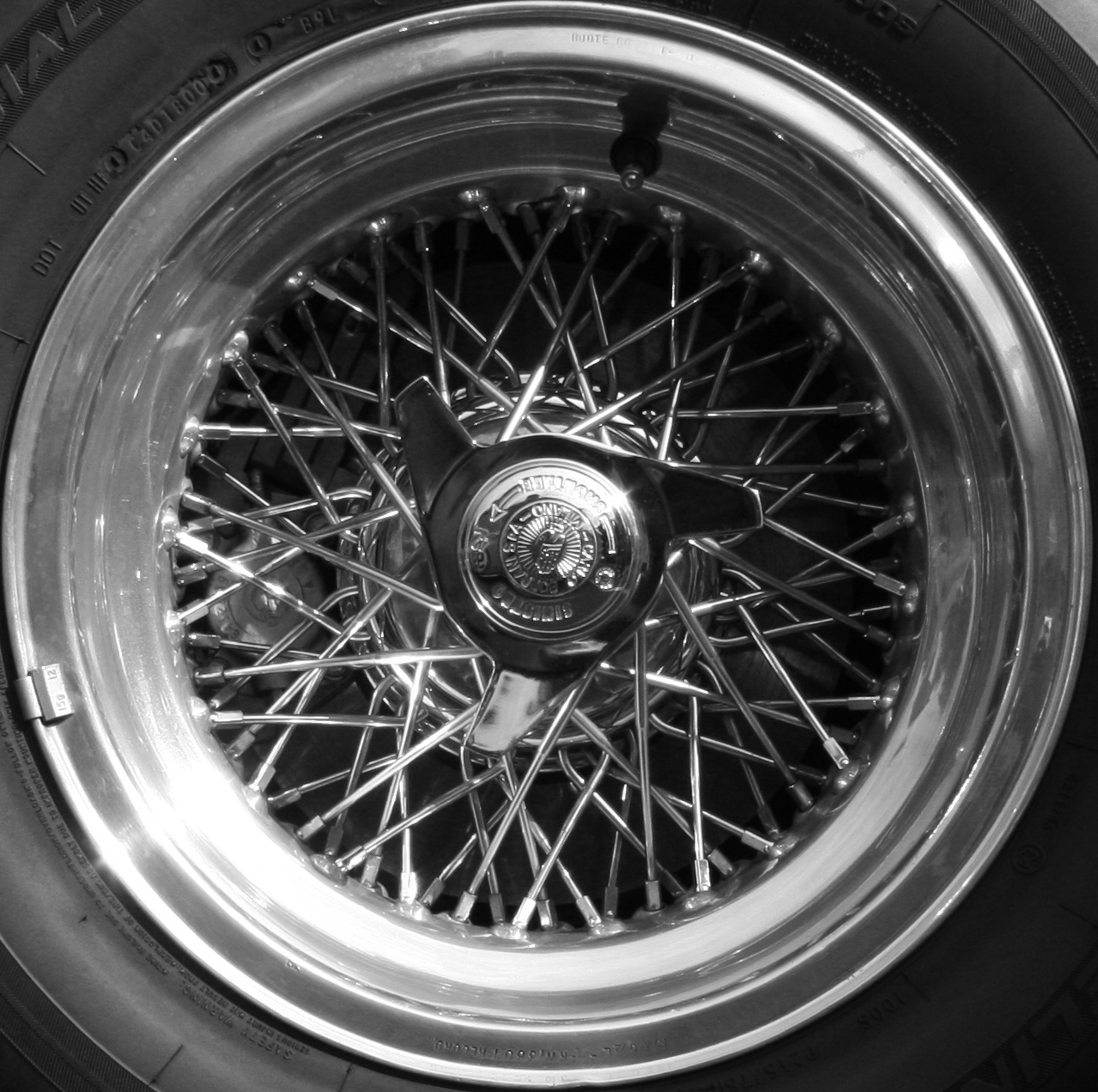
Early 1960s Borrani wire wheel with knock-off hub, as used on Ferrari 250 models

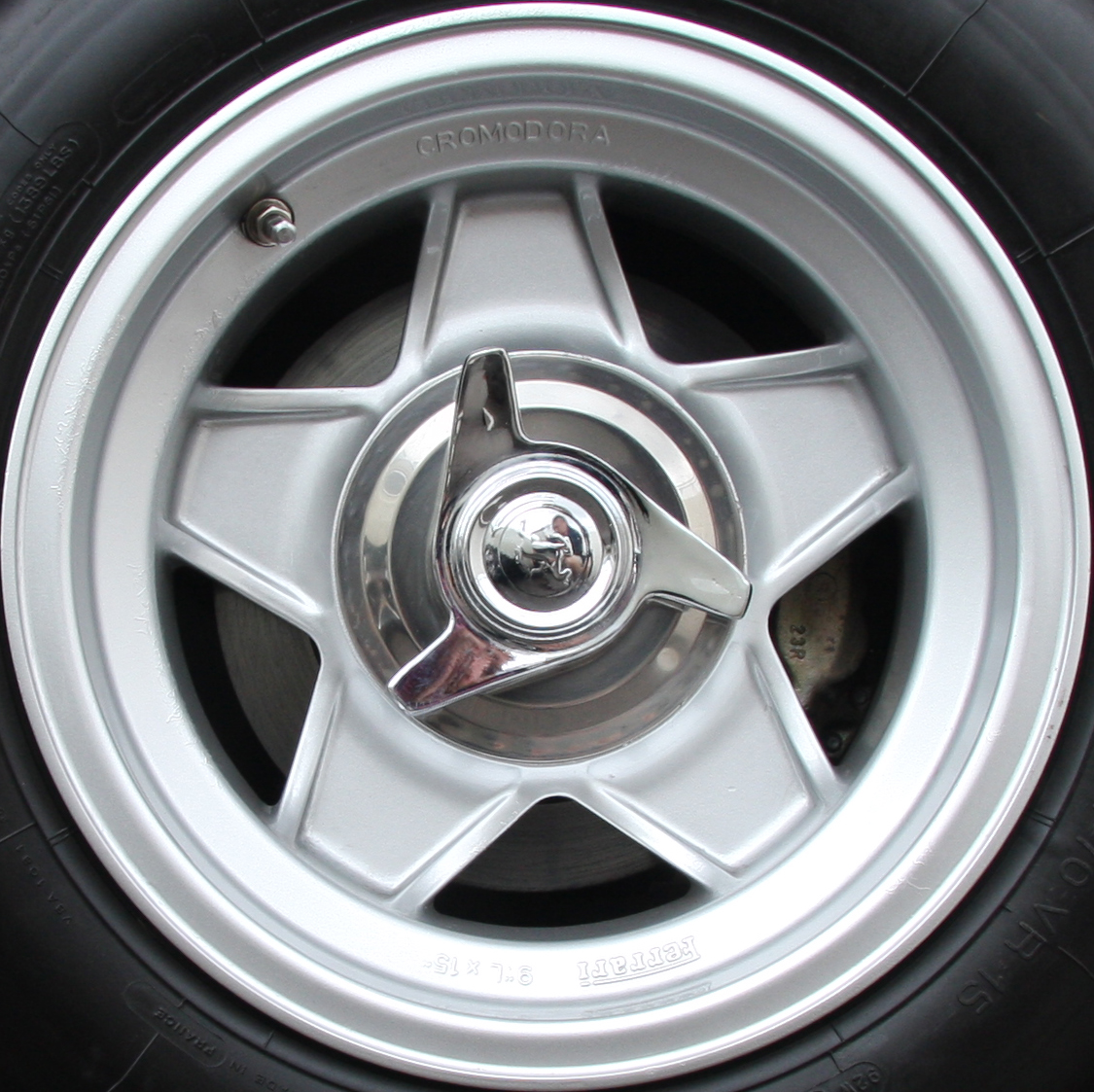
Late 60s/early 70s Cromodora alloy wheel with knock-off hub, as used on Ferrari 365 GTB/4

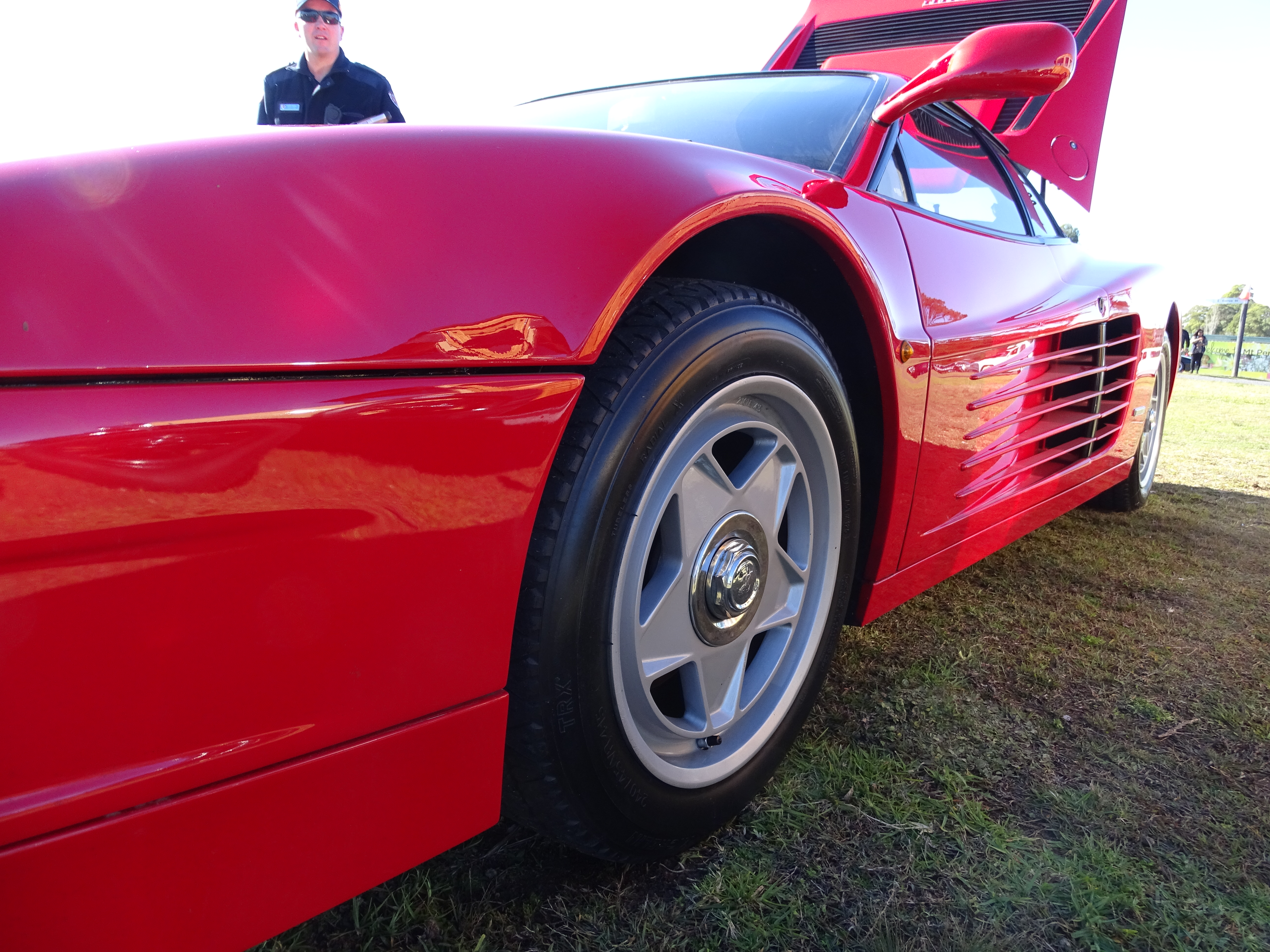
Mid-80s Ferrari Testarossa fitted with centerlock wheels. While mechanically the hubs are the splined type as on earlier models, the fastening nuts are octagonal as mandated by safety regulations.

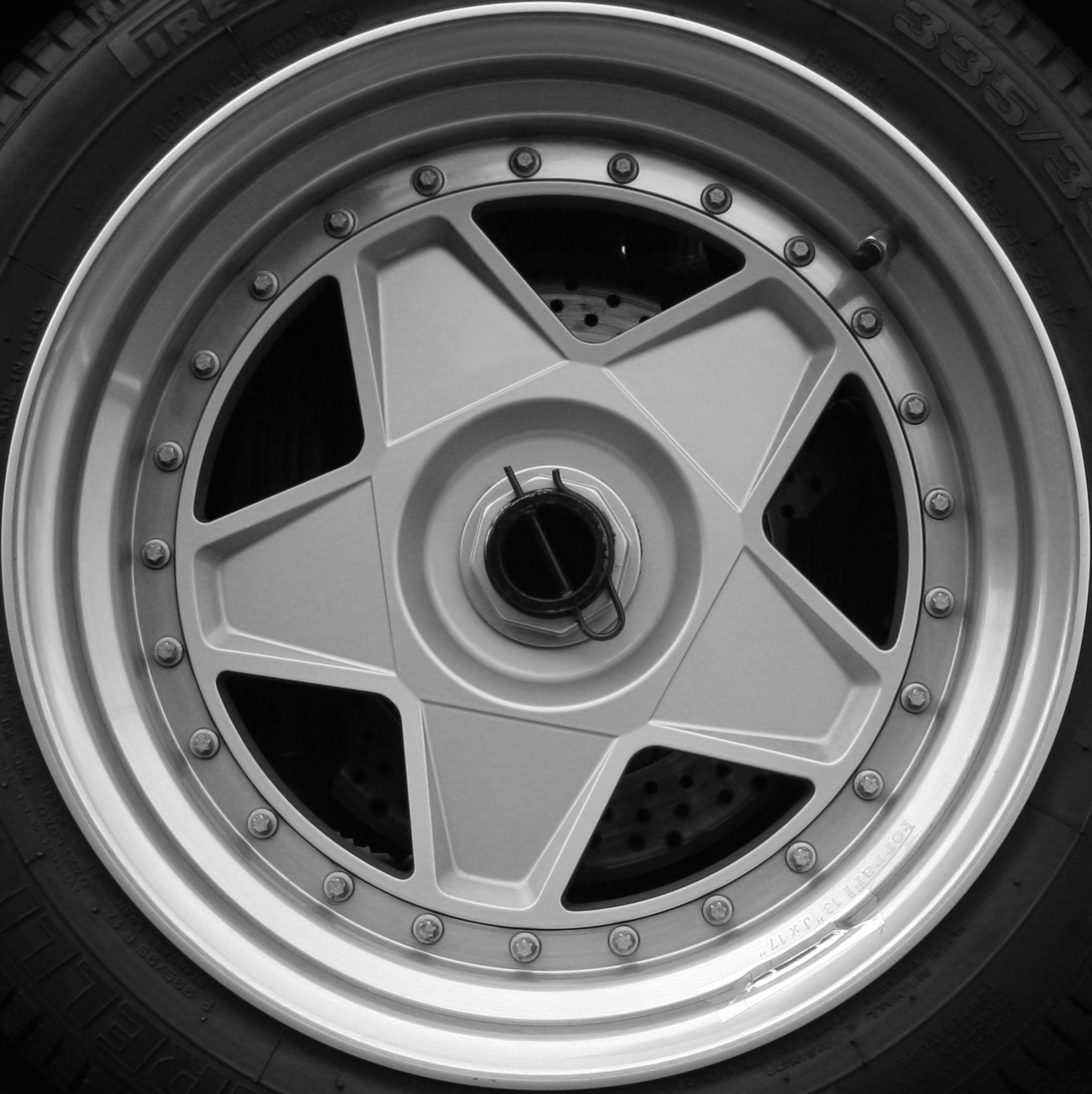
1987-1992 Ferrari F40 three-piece wheel with modern, non-splined centerlock hub. This design includes a R-clip for added safety.

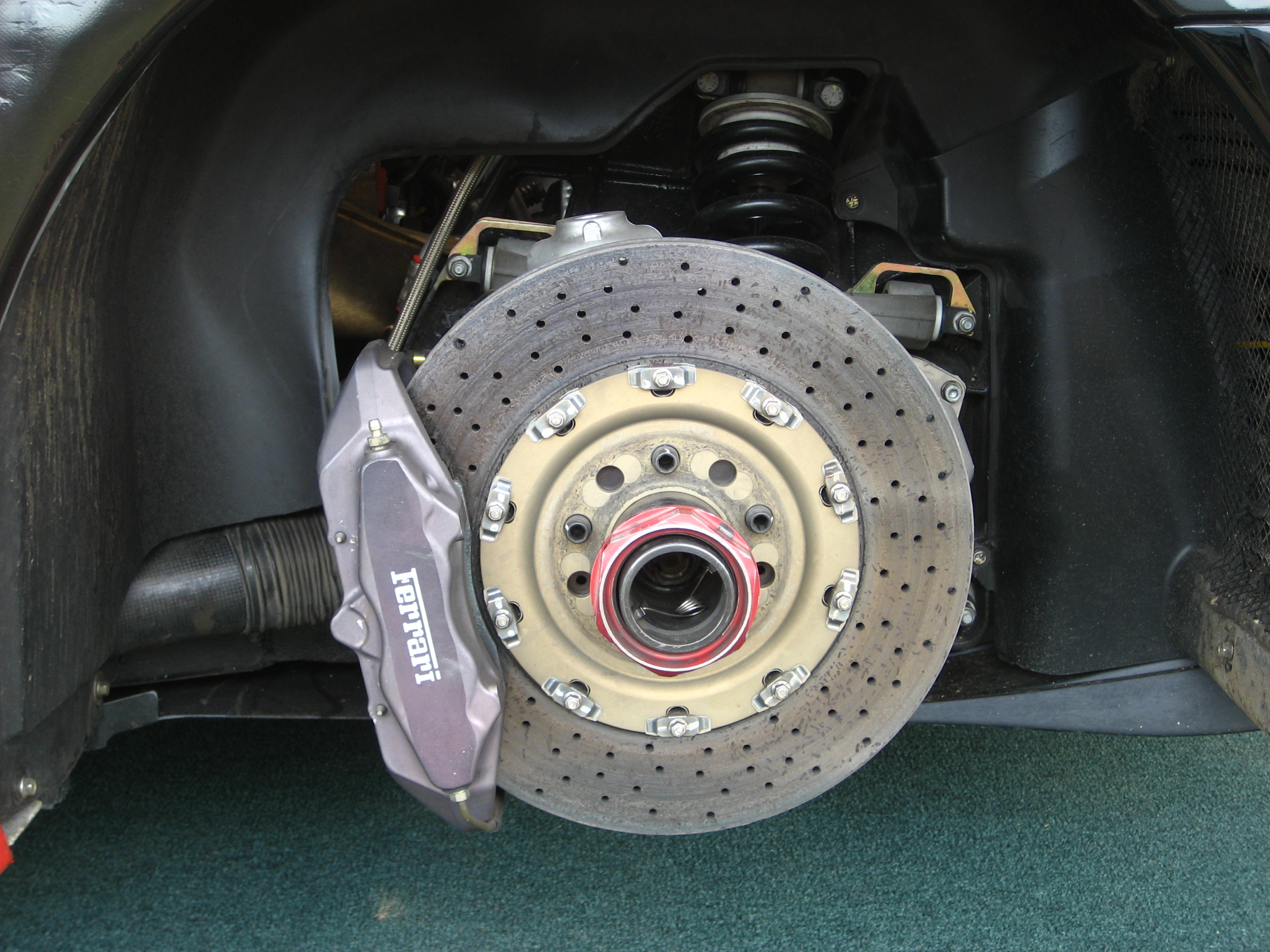
Modern racing style centerlock hub, from a 2007-2010 Ferrari F430 Challenge

== Mechanism ==
=== Knock-off hubs ===
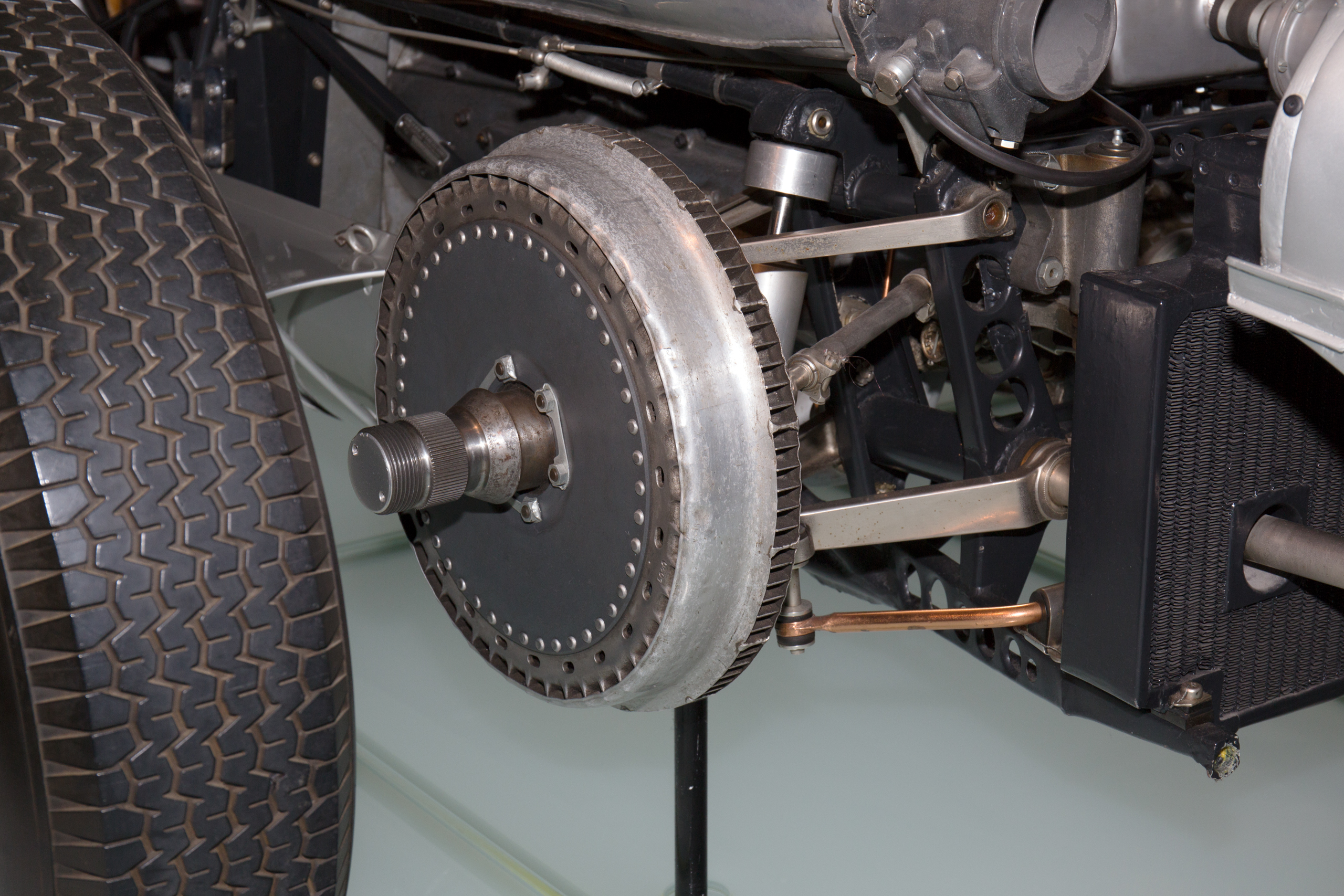
Front hub of a 1954 Mercedes-Benz W196R, showing the Rudge-Whitworth type hub shaft

Starting with the introduction of the type by Rudge-Whitworth in the early 1900s, centerlocking hub systems were of the "knock-off" (also known as "knock-on") type. These consist of a shaft at the hub, with an external screw thread, a straight external spline section and a tapered interface at the hub base. The wheel centers have internal splines and a matching taper to align and center them on the hub. The wheels are fastened to the hub by means of a winged, threaded nut, called a "knock-off" or "spinner." Usually, this will feature right-hand threads on the left side of the vehicle, and left-hand threads (rotate clockwise to remove) on the vehicle's right side so the screw-on spinner would stay tightened as the auto was in forward motion. This nut is tightened and loosened by means of hammer strikes to the wings, leading to the name "knock-off." A heavy hammer made of a soft metal such as copper or lead was usually used for this purpose. Instructions for proper installation force vary, but overtightening of the mechanism should be avoided as it can distort the matching tapers on hub and wheel, leading to spline damage, excess play in the mechanism and/or difficulty of wheel removal and installation.

The visual appearance of the knock-off nut was incorporated as a styling element on spinner hubcaps, primarily used on American cars.

=== Racing with centerlock hubs ===
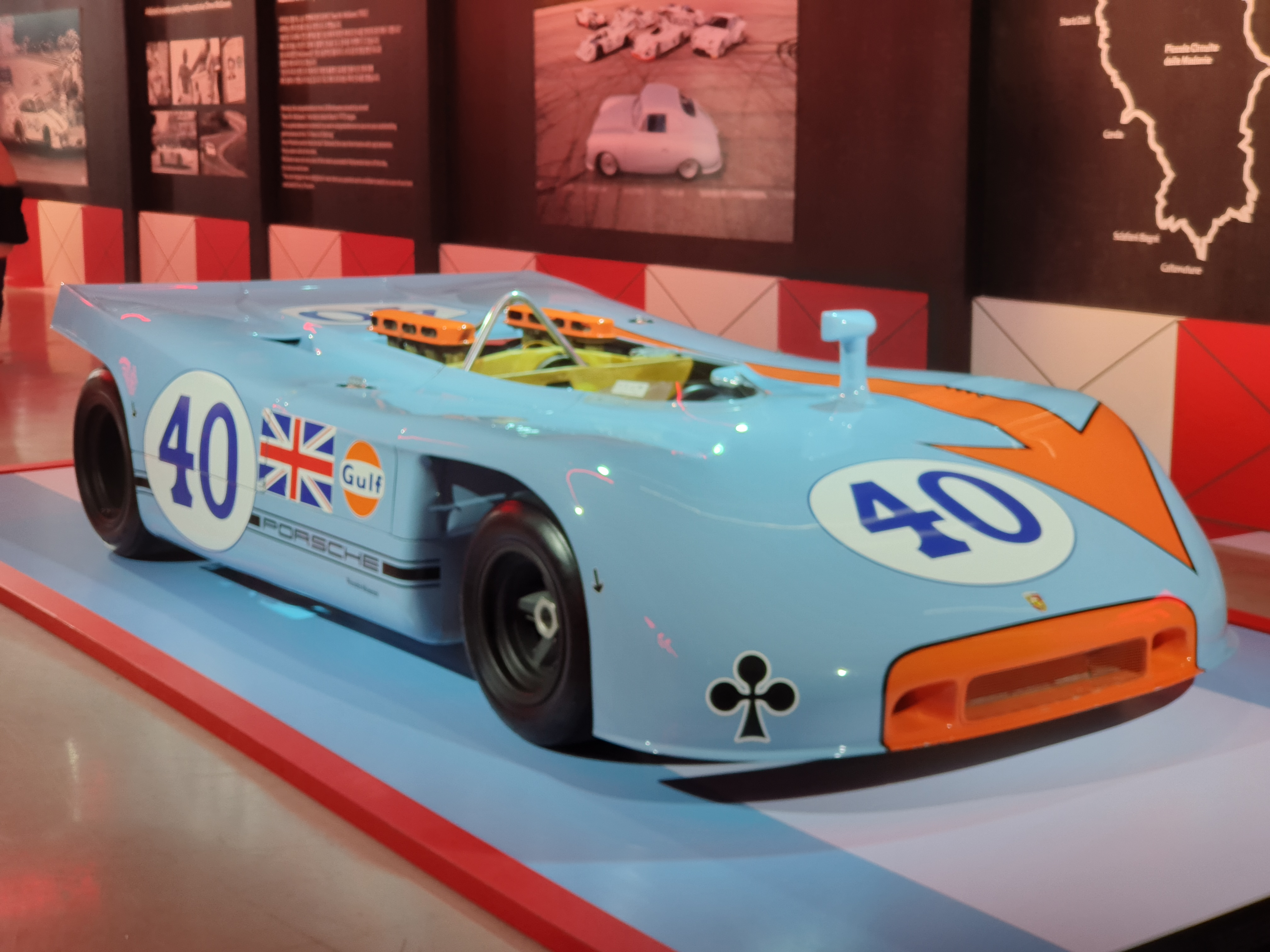
Gulf-Wyer Porsche 908/03 livery for the 1970 Targa Florio with black arrows painted on the fenders, indicating the drivers which way to open the center hex nut

Following the introduction of safety regulations in the late 1960s which forbade the winged spinner nuts, many manufacturers used the same basic mechanism with a hex nut.

For the 1970 Targa Florio on the 72 km (45 miles) road course, Porsche factory cars carried a spare wheel and tools. To indicate to the drivers which way to open the center hex nut, an arrow was painted on each fender.

=== Modern centerlock hubs ===
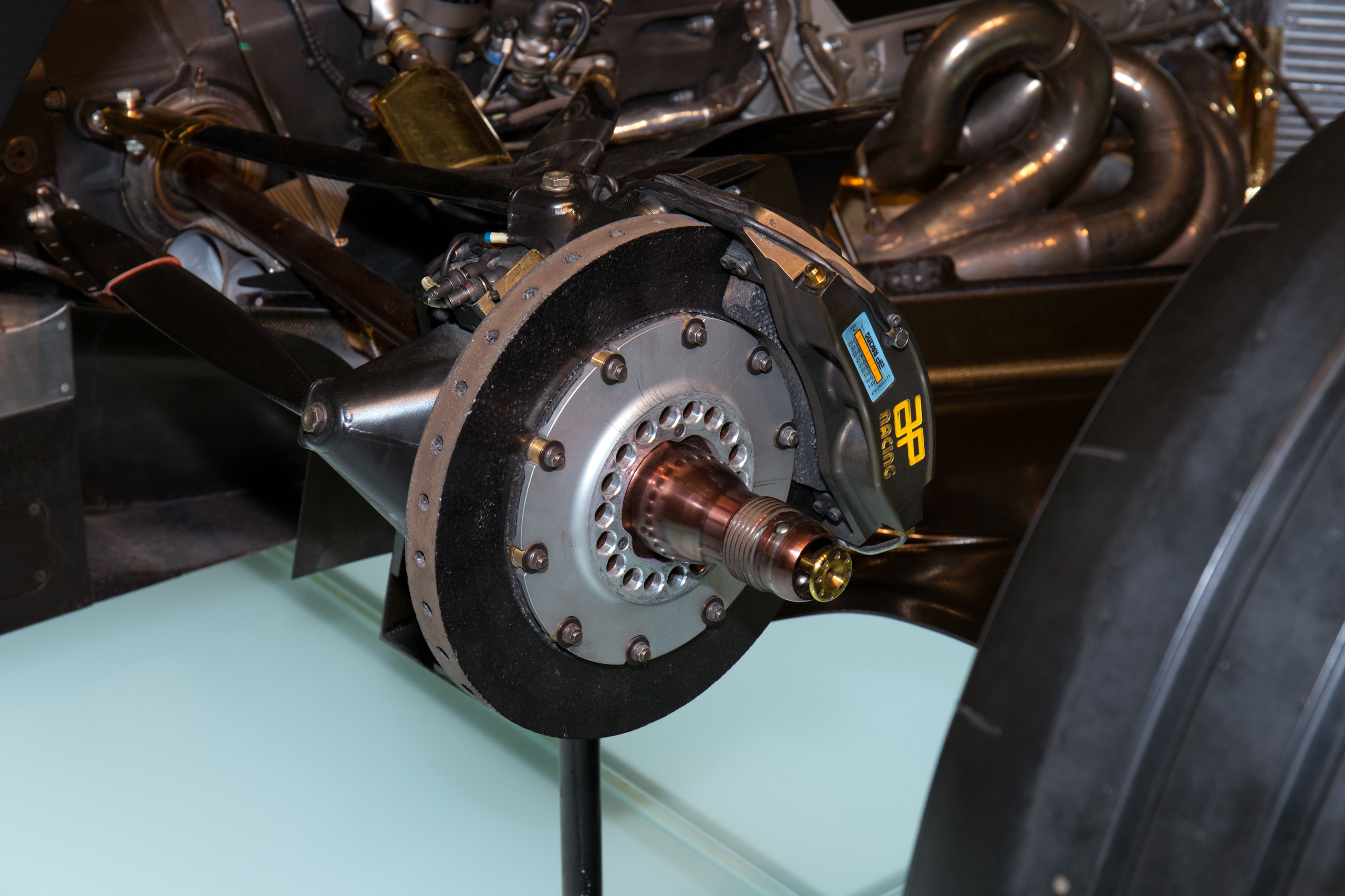
A modern centerlock hub on a McLaren MP4/14 Formula One car

Most modern centerlock wheels are fastened to the hub by a single large hex nut. A hollow, tapered shaft centers the wheel on the hub. Torque is transmitted by pins and matching holes at the hub-wheel interface. The retaining nut requires a large amount of torque to secure, therefore a long-handled torque wrench or a powerful impact wrench (also called a "wheel gun") is used to tighten it. Wheels of this type are used on many modern racing cars, including NASCAR, Formula One and racing sports cars.

Some variation among the design of the centerlock mechanism is seen among manufacturers. In particular, Porsche has developed a proprietary center locking design for use on race and road cars such as the RS Spyder and the 911 Turbo.

In Formula One cars, individual manufactures may use proprietary centerlocking hub and nut designs. These often have unique, specially shaped nuts designed to interface with the tools used to tighten the nuts, in order to improve torque transmission and pit stop speed. The nuts themselves may have a mechanism that retains them inside the wheel once it is removed from the hub, to prevent loss and further streamline wheel changes. FIA rules also mandate an additional locking mechanism be included in F1 centerlock hubs, which manufacturers have implemented in different ways.

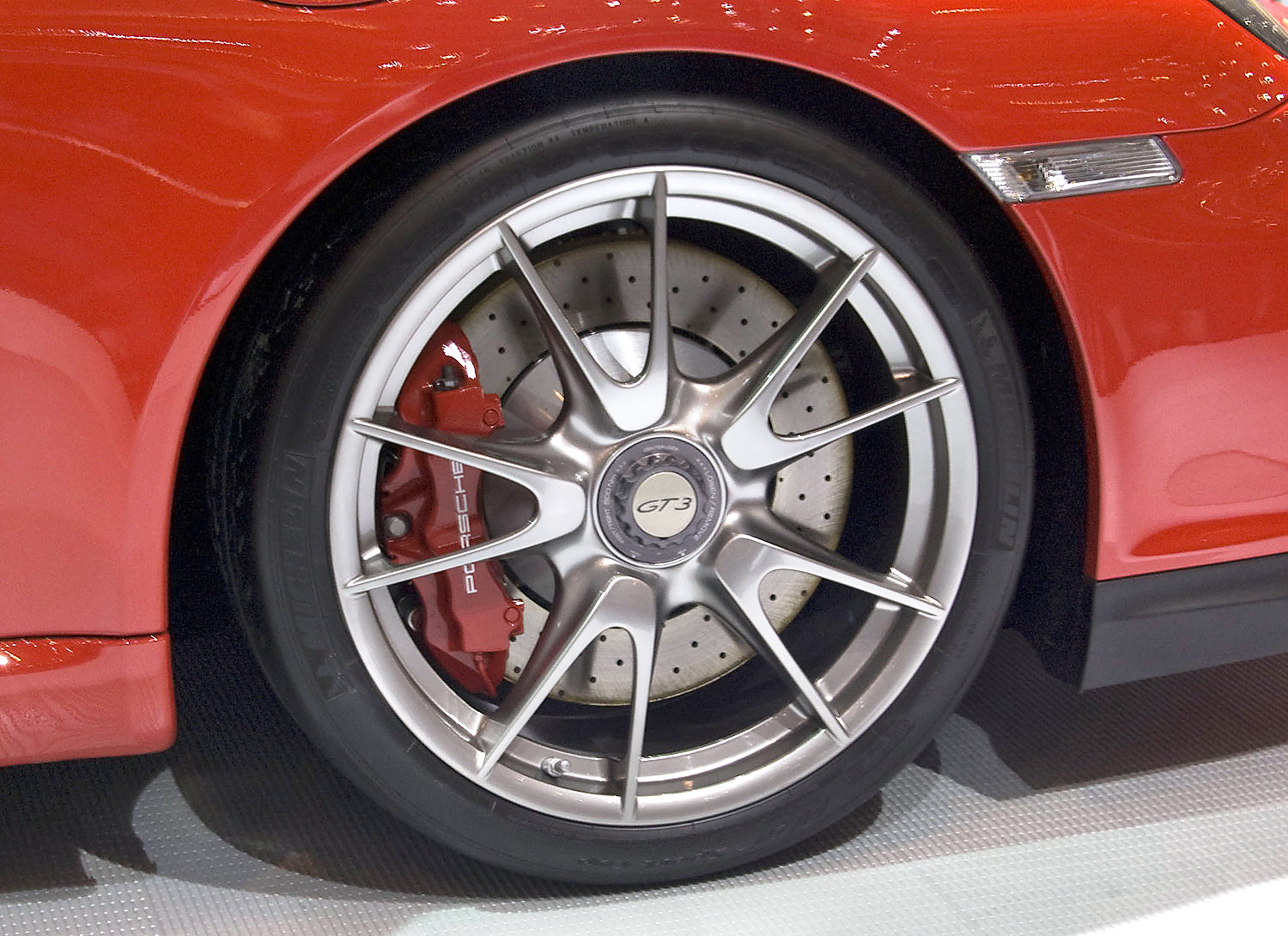
A modern centerlock wheel mounted on a 2009 Porsche 997 GT3, with Porsche-specific fastener

=== Adapters ===
Several automotive parts manufacturers market centerlock adapters, designed to convert hubs with a lug nut fastening system to accept centerlock wheels. These consist of one "centerlock adapter" placed behind the rim and bolted to the hub, followed by a locking nut placed in front of the rim and a safety cap.

From 1963 to 1967 the Chevrolet Corvette could be ordered from the factory with centerlock hub adapters and knock-off wheels.

== Vehicle use ==
Several vehicles are factory equipped with centerlock wheels.

- Porsche Carrera GT
- Porsche 918 Spyder
- Porsche 997 (GTS, GT3, GT2, optional)
- Porsche 991 (GTS, Turbo, Turbo S, GT3, GT3 RS)
- Porsche 992 (GTS, Turbo, Turbo S, GT3, GT3 RS)
- Koenigsegg One:1
- Koenigsegg Regera
- Lamborghini Aventador SV and SVJ (optional)
- Lamborghini Huracán (optional)
- Lotus Elan
- Alfa Romeo Giulia GTA and GTAm
