= Daniel Rudge =

Daniel Rudge (1840 – 26 June 1880) was a British engineer who built high-end bicycles and velocipedes. Rudge invented the adjustable ball bearing bicycle hub (British Patent No 526) in 1878.

The French racing cyclist Charles Terront, renowned for winning the first Paris–Brest–Paris event in 1891, used Rudge's axles with much success thereby bringing world attention to Rudge. In the years before John Dunlop invented the pneumatic tyre, Rudge addressed the rough ride by producing a four-bladed, spring-suspended fork in 1887.

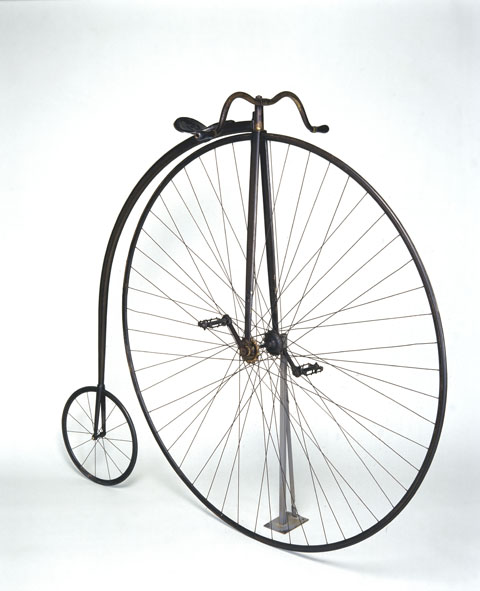
A D Rudge & Co. "ordinary" bicycle, built 1884

After Rudge's death, his company was merged with The Tangent & Coventry Tricycle Company to form D. Rudge & Co. which in 1894 became Rudge Whitworth Cycles. By 1911, the Rudge Whitworth Cycle Company was also manufacturing motorcycles.

After the company fell on hard times in the Great Depression, the music company EMI bought the Rudge name. EMI produced bicycles under the Rudge name from 1935 until 1943 when they sold the name to Raleigh.
