= Atco (British company) =

British lawnmower company

- Atco logo used 1978–1985
- Industry: Lawn mowers
- Founded: 1921
- Founder: Charles H Pugh Ltd
- Website: www.atco.co.uk

Atco (Atlas Chain Company) Limited was a British mower company which traded as "Atco Ltd" from 1981 to 1990, making lawn mowers and garden tools. It sold a range of lawn mowers including lawn and garden tractors.

== History ==
Atco is the trade name for lawn mowers derived from the Atlas Chain Company, founded by Charles Henry Pugh in 1865, which made chains for ships.

Mowing machines (replacing scythes) were drawn by horses but, after a horse died while pulling a mower around his company's facility, Pugh created a petrol lawnmower, which became the first of its kind to be mass-produced anywhere in the world.

Charles H Pugh Ltd started making motor mowers with a 22-inch (560 mm)-wide cut. The Atco motor mower was an immediate success. 900 of them were made in 1921, each costing £75. Within five years, annual production had accelerated to tens of thousands. Prices were cut and a range of sizes was available, making the Standard the first truly mass-produced motor mower.

In the early hours of 5 November 1981 a fire destroyed the old Charles H Pugh site and stock. The factory moved to Stowmarket in East Anglia, where it reopened as Atco Ltd.

In 1991 Atco Ltd was renamed as Atco-Qualcast Ltd, and the mower works was bought by its management in 1992; this company was acquired by Robert Bosch GmbH in 1995.

In 2011 Bosch sold the intellectual drawings, plant, equipment and tooling for the entire existing mower range to the Allett Mowers division of Turfmech Machinery Limited in Hixon, Staffordshire. Allett commenced manufacturing the range of Atco mowers with Allett branding instead of Atco, and with new model names. In the same year, Bosch licensed the Atco brand name to Global Garden Products Italy S.p.A. (part of STIGA S.p.A.), which launched a new Atco branded range of lawnmowers. On 29 April 2013 Global Garden Products Italy S.p.A. bought the Atco brand name from Bosch.

== Products (1980–1992) ==
All the products below, from 1980 to 1992, are now obsolete.

=== Lawn & garden tractors ===
==== Made in U.S. (1980–85) ====
From 1980, Atco Motor Mowers imported lawn and garden tractors from the United States, made to its designs.

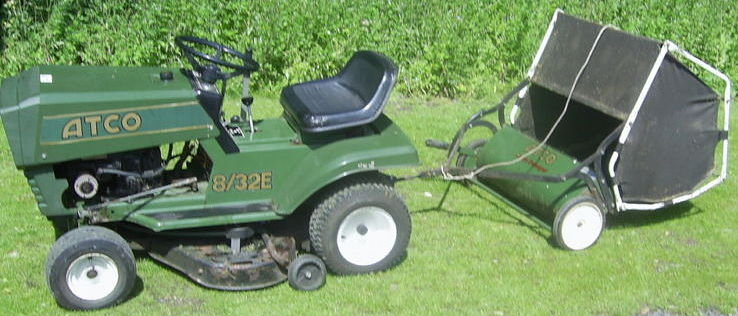
Atco 8/32E lawn tractor, 1980

The full model range of American-built Atco lawn and garden tractors was:

- 7/32 – 3-speed with reverse, 7 horsepower (5.2 kW) engine, 32 inches (810 mm) cutter deck
- 8/32E – 3-speed with reverse, 8 horsepower (6 kW) engine, 32 inches (810 mm) cutter deck
- 8/36E – 3-speed with reverse, 8 horsepower (6 kW) engine, 36 inches (910 mm) cutter deck
- 11/36E – 5-speed with reverse, 11 horsepower (8.2 kW) engine, 36 inches (910 mm) cutter deck
- 16/42E – 4-speed with reverse, 16 horsepower (12 kW) engine, 42 inches (1,100 mm) cutter deck

The "E" at the end of model number for American tractors stands for electric start; the 7/32 never had electric start but did have recoil start.

==== Made in Britain (1986–92) ====
In 1986, Atco stopped production of the American lawn and garden tractors and started producing its own in Stowmarket, Suffolk, in the United Kingdom. The first new model was the 11/36, which won "Best Grass Cutting Machine of The Year" in 1986.

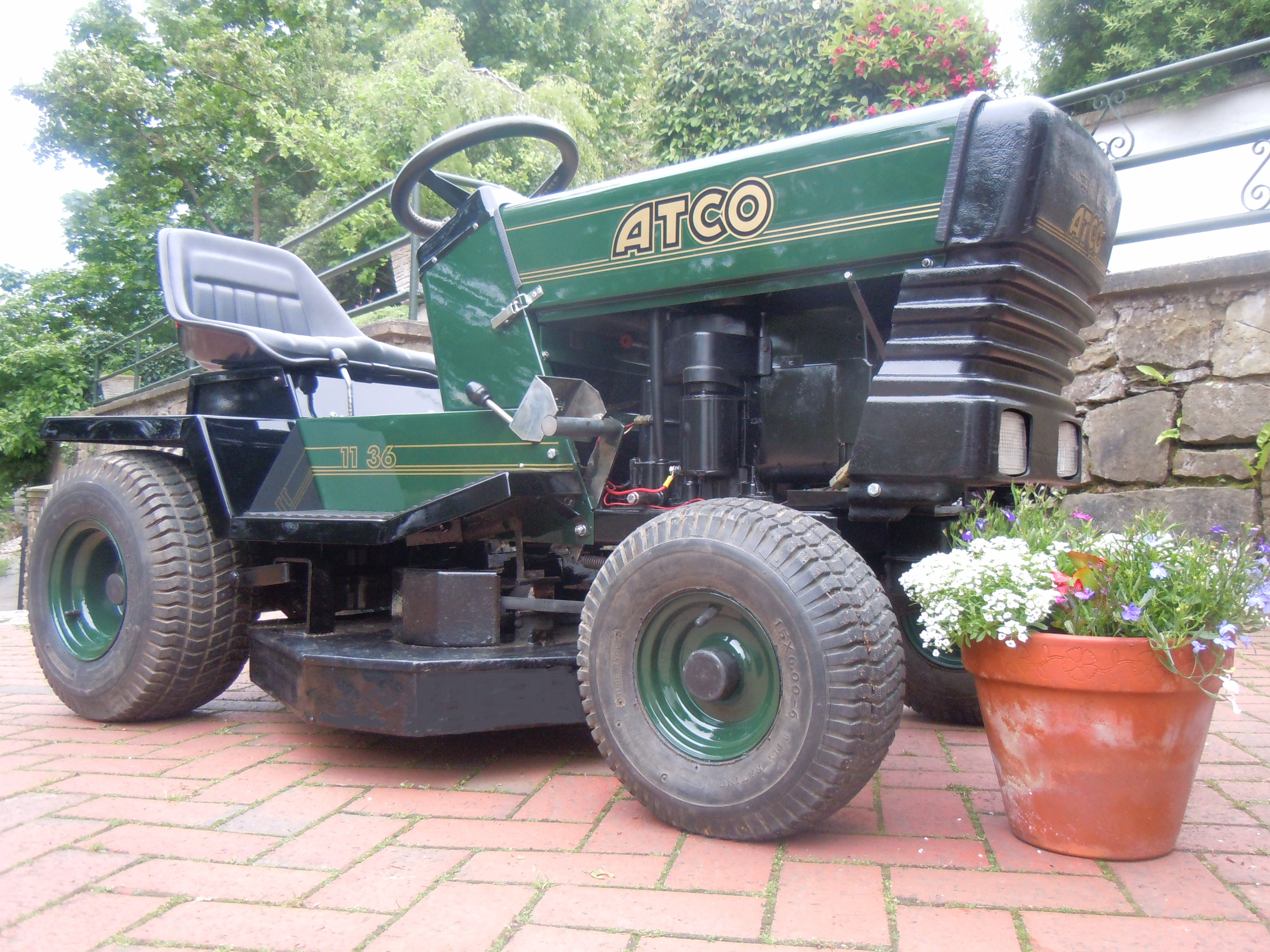
Atco 11/36 lawn tractor, 1986

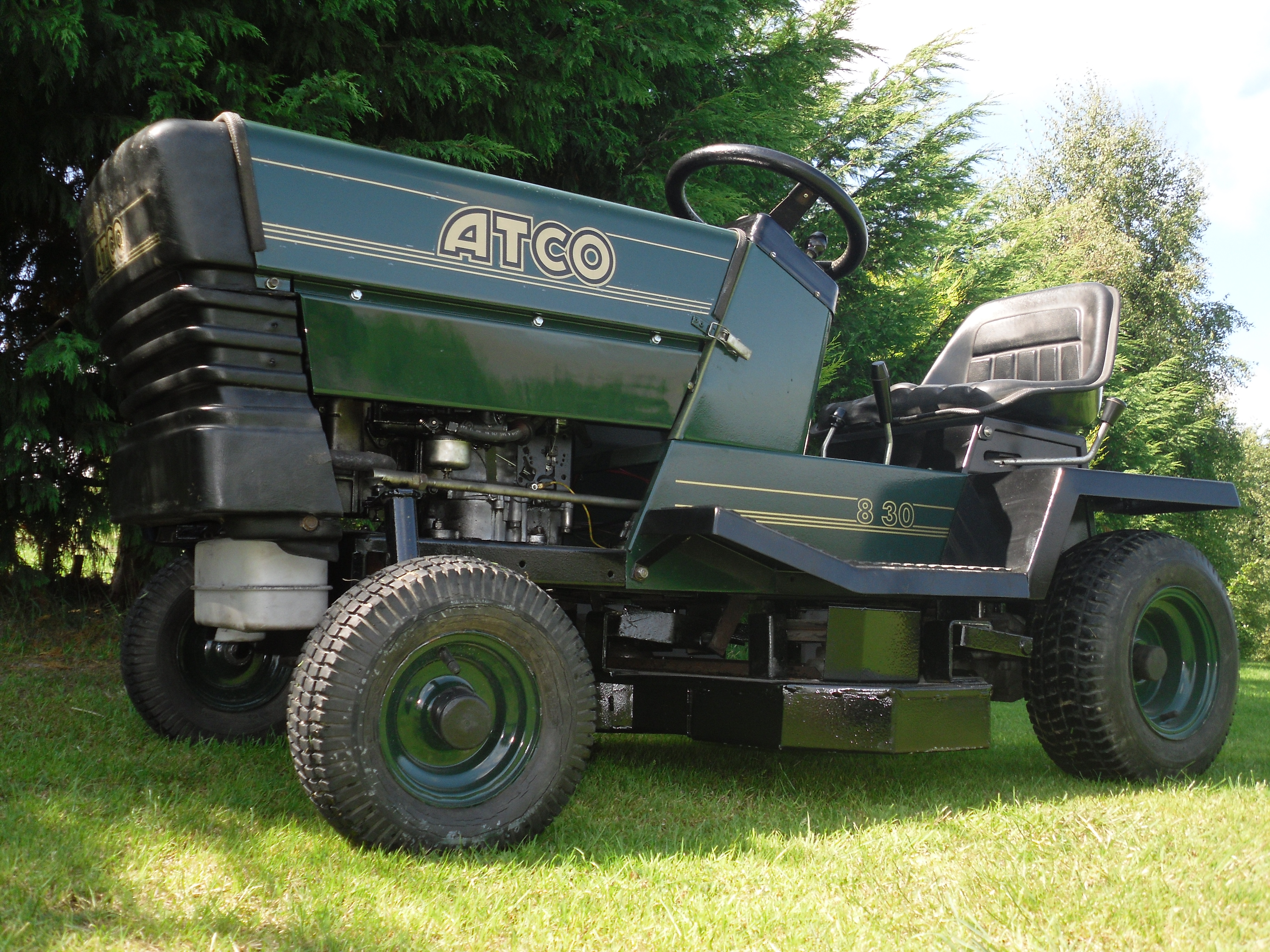
Atco 8/30 lawn tractor, 1988

The full model range of British Atco lawn and garden tractors was:

- 6/30 – 3-speed with reverse, 6 horsepower (4.5 kW) engine, 30 inches (760 mm) cutter deck
- 8/30 – 3-speed with reverse, 8 horsepower (6 kW) engine, 30 inches (760 mm) cutter deck
- 8/36 – 5-speed with reverse, 8 horsepower (6 kW) engine, 36 inches (910 mm) cutter deck
- 11/36 – 5-speed with reverse, 11 horsepower (8.2 kW) engine, 36 inches (910 mm) cutter deck
- 12/36 – 5-speed with reverse, 12 horsepower (8.9 kW) engine, 36 inches (910 mm) cutter deck

The 8/30 and 8/36 lawn tractors were sold with an option of a powered grass collector, while the 12/36 was only sold with a powered grass collector. The Atco 6/30 was an economy model with pull start, no electrical equipment, and a solid mild steel bonnet front.

Atco also made a trailer to fit all models, with a 10-cubic-foot (0.3 m^{3}) hopper which tipped for emptying.

There was a choice of 30-inch (760 mm) or 36-inch (910 mm) cutting widths, both having twin blades. 'V' channelling in the deck ensured that grass cut by one blade was not thrown in the path of the other blade. Grass was ejected not from the side, as was common with other tractors, but from the rear. That meant the non-collecting models could be hitched to a towed sweeper to collect grass cuttings, leaves and other debris.

The tractors had 8 horsepower (6 kW), 11 horsepower (8.2 kW), or 12 horsepower (8.9 kW) engines. The 7.25-imperial-pint (4.12 L) fuel tank provided approximately 2 hours and 30 minutes of continuous mowing. The tractors also featured wide pneumatic tyres.

Atco was the first ride-on lawn tractor to have a powered grass sweeper, driven from a power take-off (PTO) at the rear of the machine. The PTO worked independently of the blades, so the user could cut the lawn without collecting the clippings or vice versa.

Atco 11/36 lawn tractor (1986), fully restored
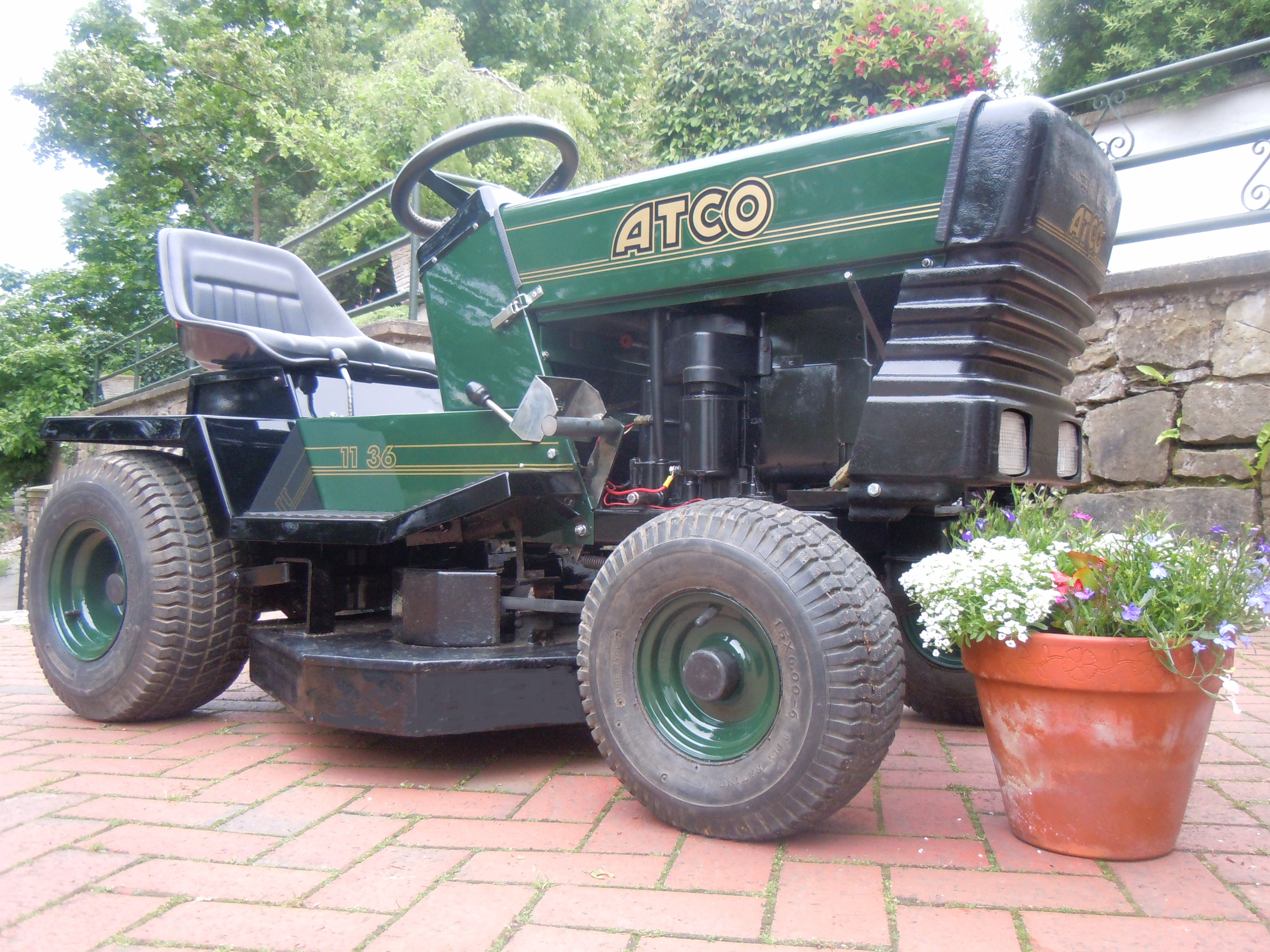
Whole machine

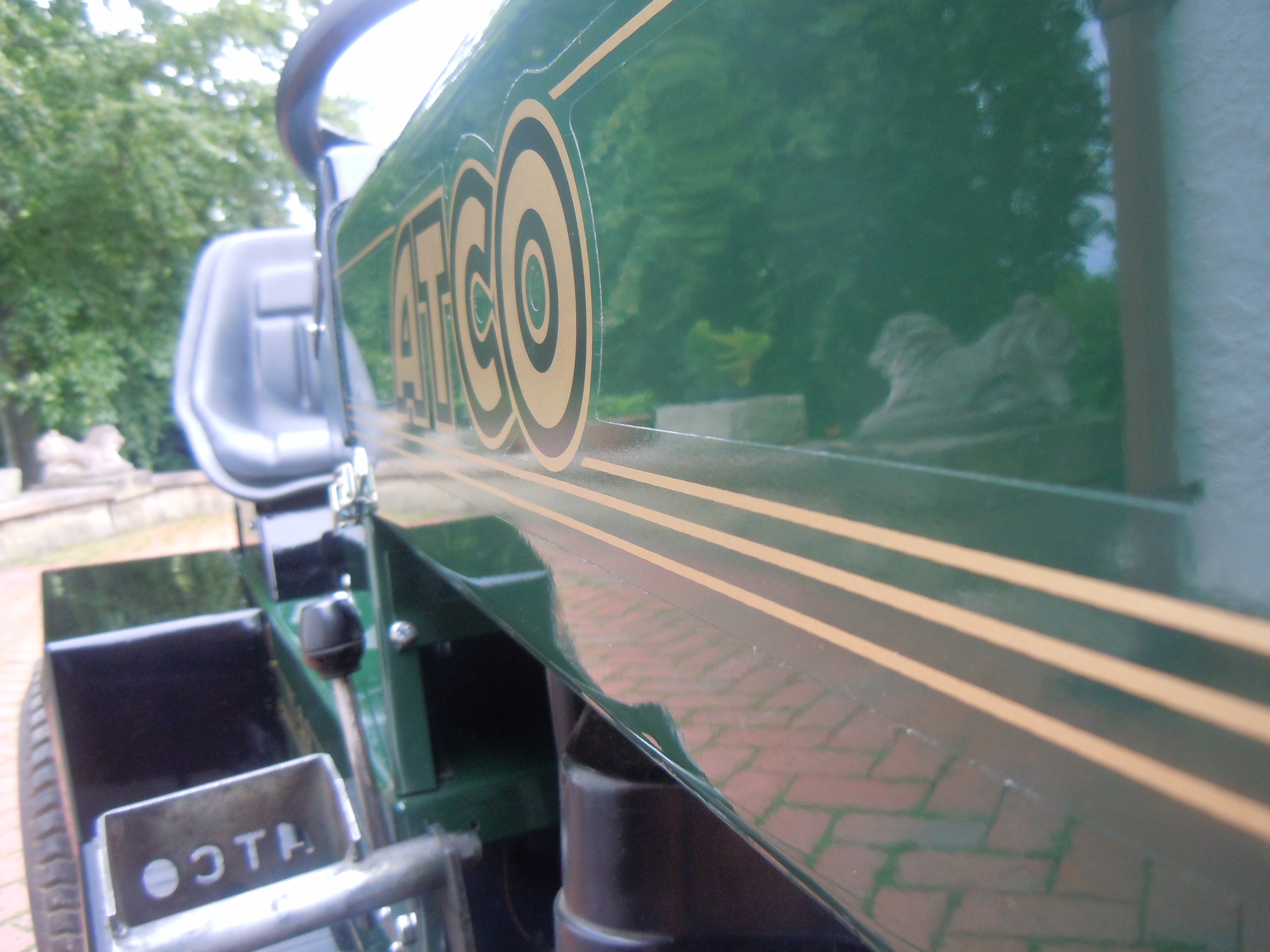
Bonnet of Atco lawn tractor

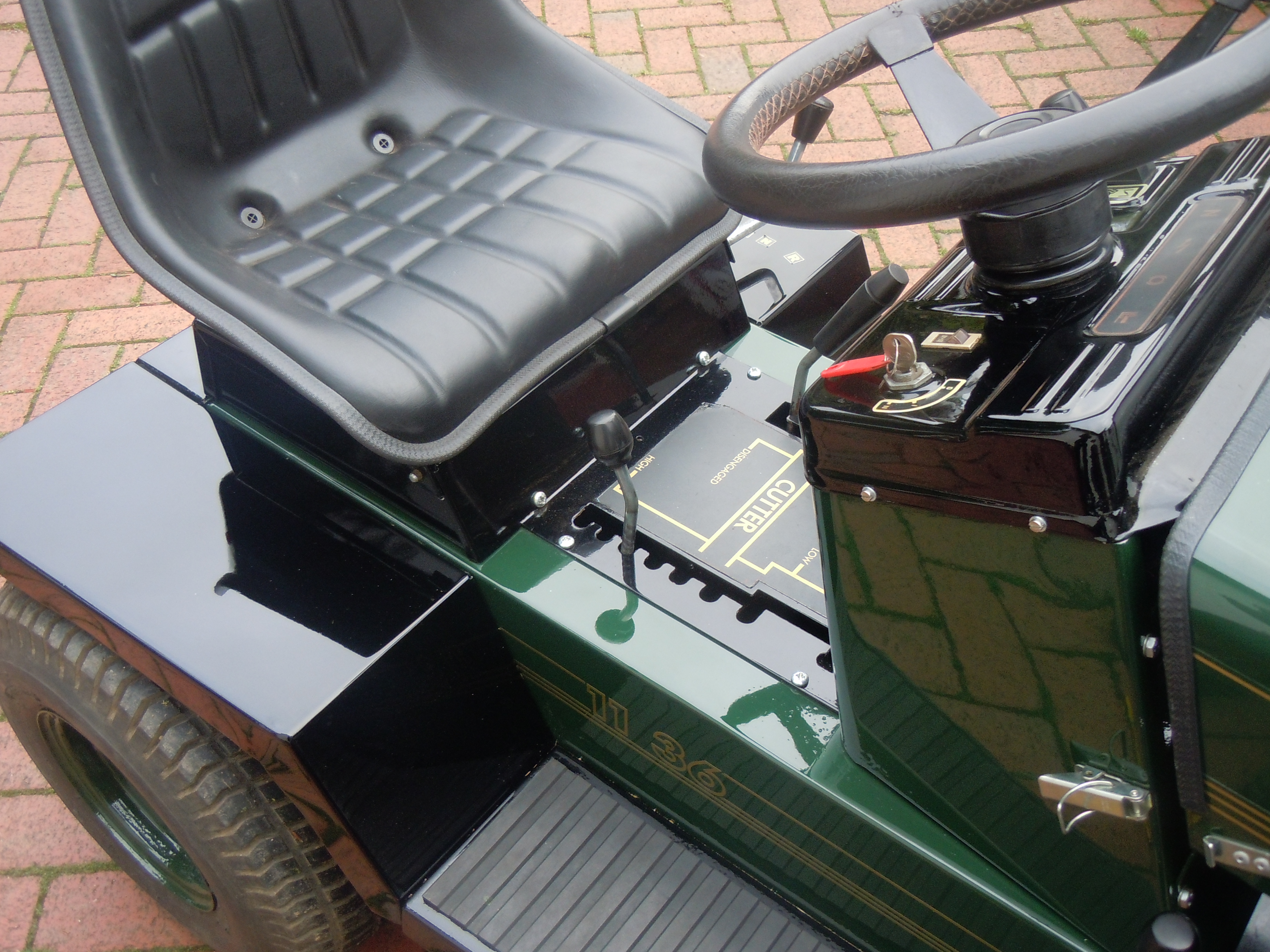
Controls of Atco lawn tractor

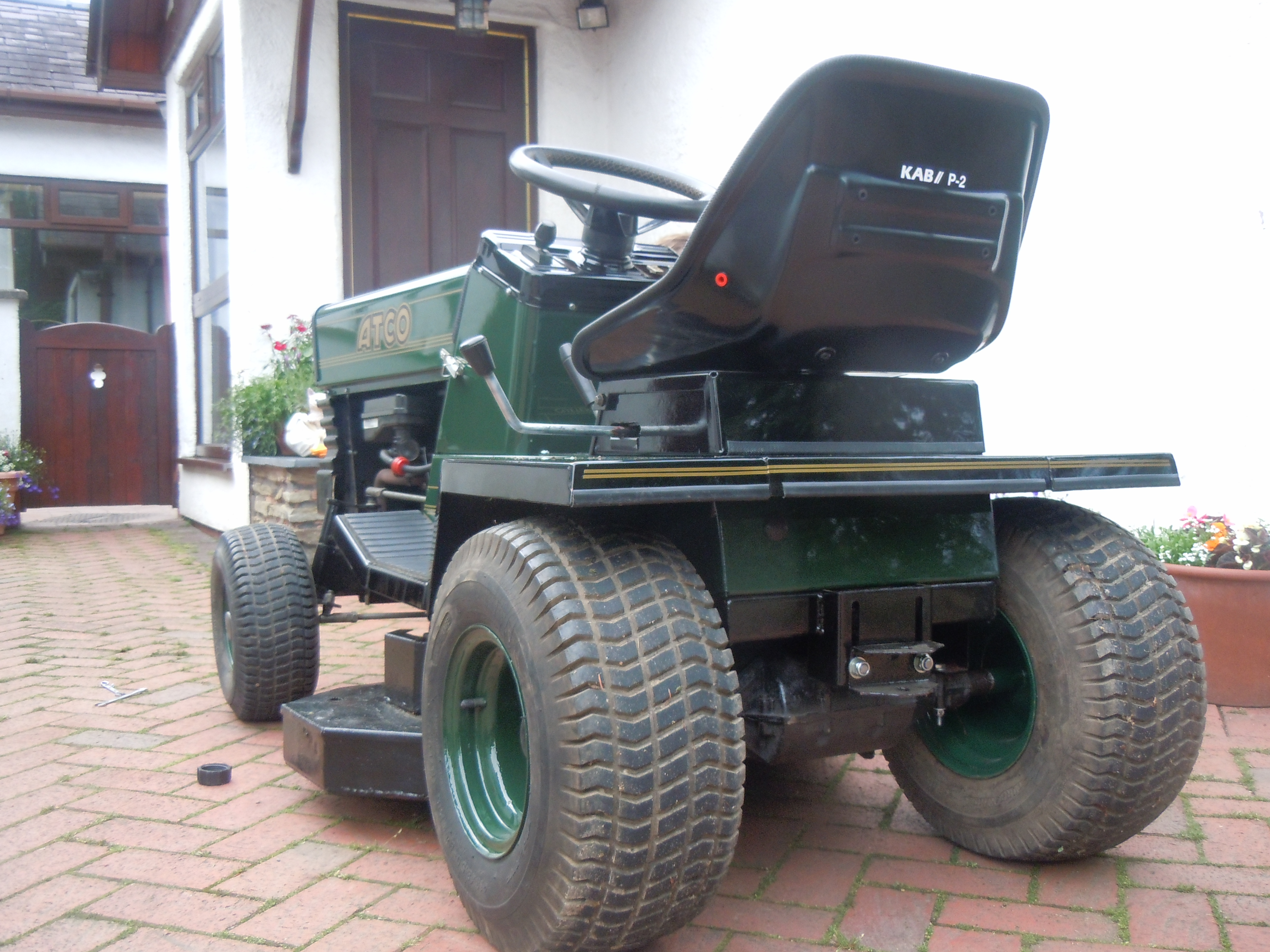
Rear of Atco lawn tractor

Atco stopped making lawn tractors in 1992. When GGP Ltd bought the Atco name in 2011, the company started producing new lawn tractors branded Atco.

=== Lawn mowers ===
==== Commodore – domestic petrol cylinder mower (1986–92) ====
Available in four sizes of cut: 12 inches (300 mm), 14 inches (360 mm), 17 inches (430 mm) and 20 inches (510 mm).

Models Numbers for the Atco Commodore were:

- Commodore B12 – recoil start
- Commodore B14 – recoil start
- Commodore B17 – recoil start
- Commodore B20 – recoil start
- Commodore B14 – electric start
- Commodore B17 – electric start
- Commodore B20 – electric start

Electric start models were available from April 1988.

==== Ensign – domestic petrol cylinder mower (1990–92) ====
The Ensign had a cushion-grip handlebar that could be adjusted to height and an adjustable comb which lifted flattened stems which might not otherwise be cut. Polished beechwood front rollers allowed mowing up to the lawn edge and could be replaced quickly with sidewheels for cutting long or wet grass.

Fitted with the Atco 144cc engine, the Ensign was available in a choice of three cutting widths: 12 inches (300 mm), 14 inches (360 mm) and 17 inches (430 mm). Key start was available on the 14 in. and 17in. models.

==== Imperial – domestic petrol cylinder mower (1990–92) ====
Both front and rear rollers could be individually levelled to maintain alignment between the mower and the lawn. As well as a comb for raising flattened grass, the Imperial had a scraper which prevented the build-up of grass on the steel front roller. A Mitsubishi key-start engine was fitted.

==== Royale – heavy-duty petrol cylinder mower (1964–2011) ====
Top of Atco's cylinder mower range, the Royale was designed for large areas of fine lawn. The traditional 6-bladed steel cutting cylinder gave 70 cuts per yard while the heavy duty rollers helped to produce a striped finish.

Early models of the Royale featured a Tecumseh–built horizontal shaft engine with recoil start. Engines in later models were from Briggs & Stratton, with an electric start option introduced during the 1980s. The Recommended Retail Price of the machine, just before it was discontinued in 2011, was over £2000, making it the most expensive mower in the Atco range. All three models – 20 inches (510 mm), 24 inches (610 mm) and 30 inches (760 mm) – were largely hand-built by a small team.

==== Rotary mowers ====
In more recent years, Atco has been producing rotary mowers powered by either petrol or electricity. Production of petrol-engined cylinder mowers continues with the "Clipper" range, in three sizes.
