= Rudge Ulster =

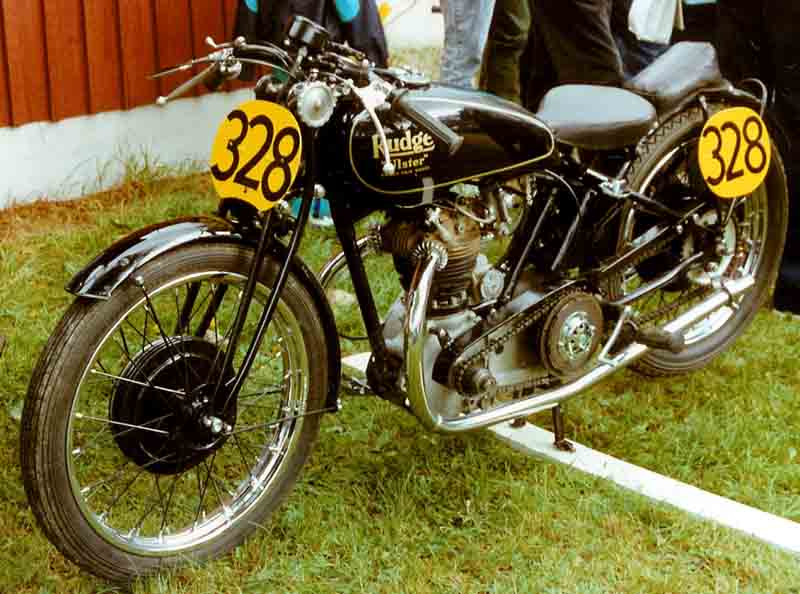
- Manufacturer: Rudge-Whitworth
- Production: 1929–1939
- Engine: 499 cc (30.5 cu in) OHV single

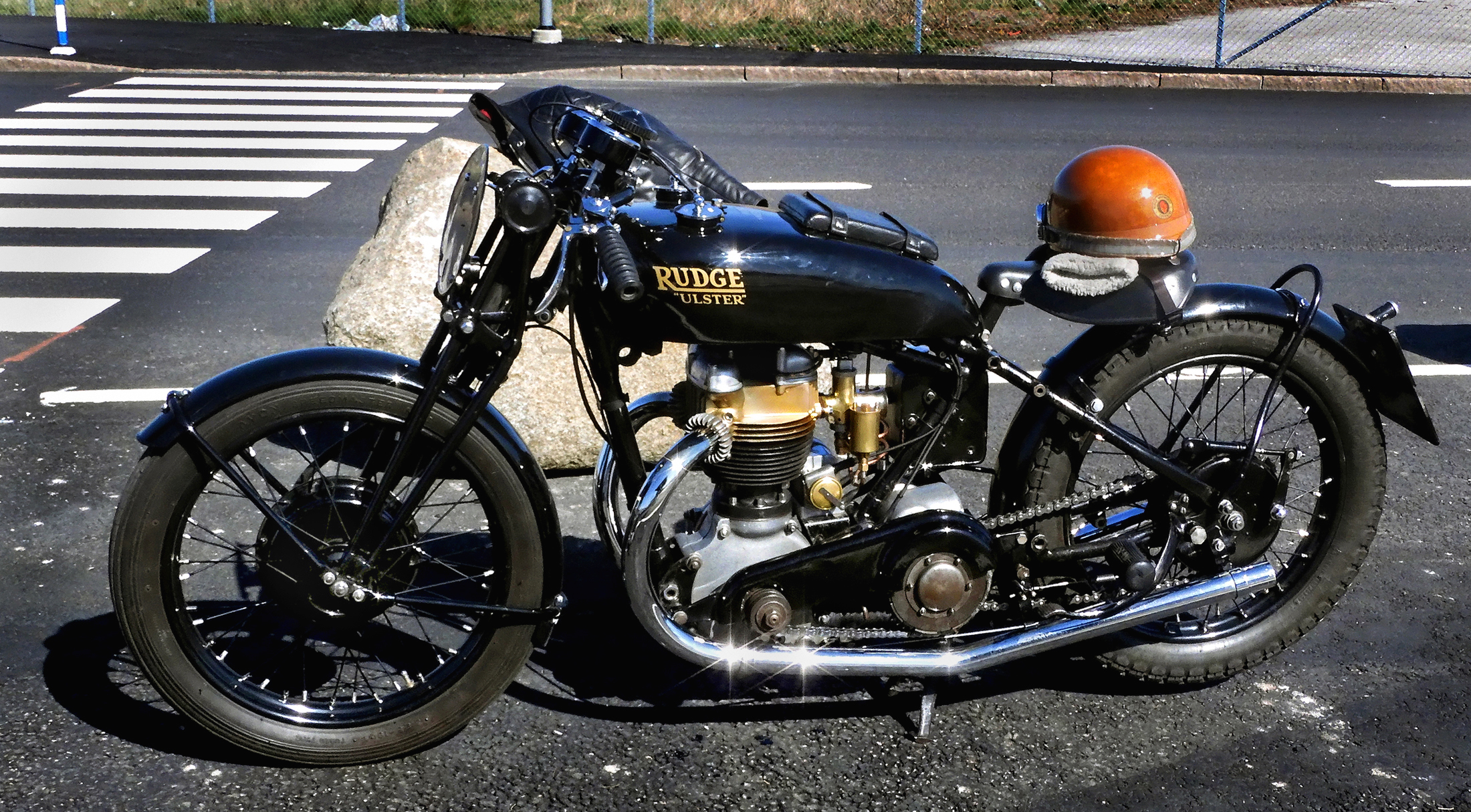
Rudge Ulster 500 cc from 1937 in Ystad 2023.

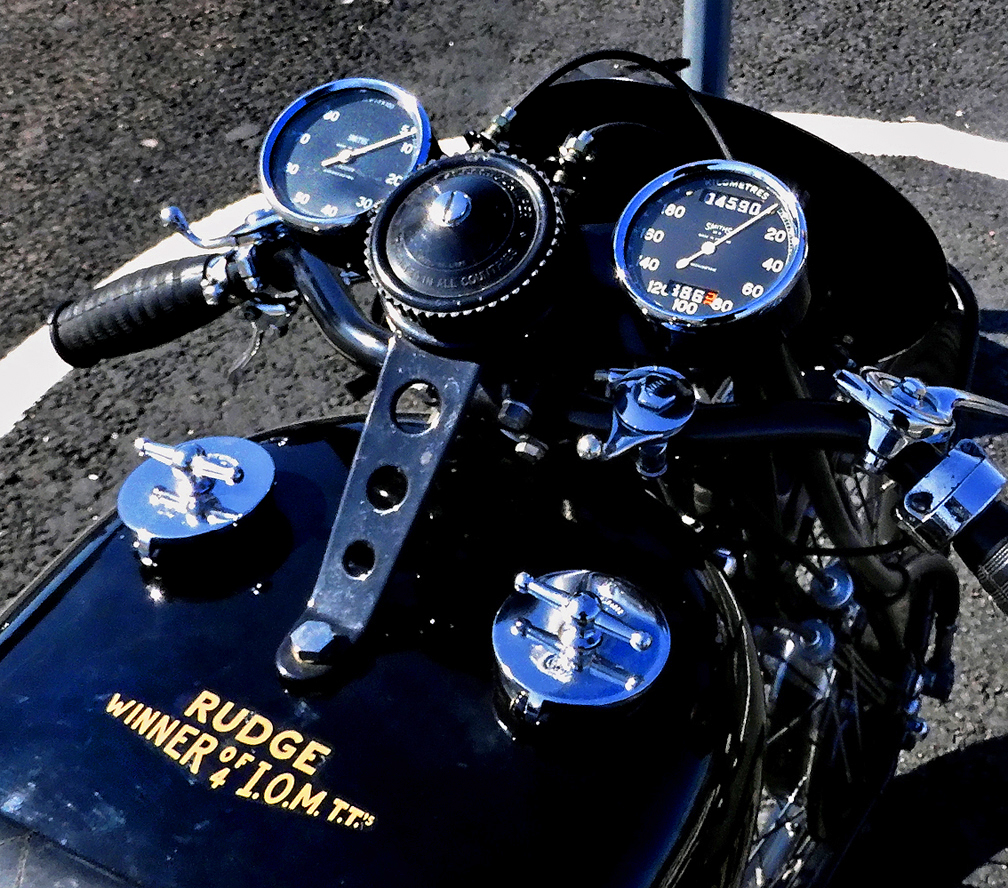
The gauges.

The Rudge Ulster was a British motorcycle manufactured by Rudge-Whitworth from 1929 until the outbreak of World War II.

== Development ==
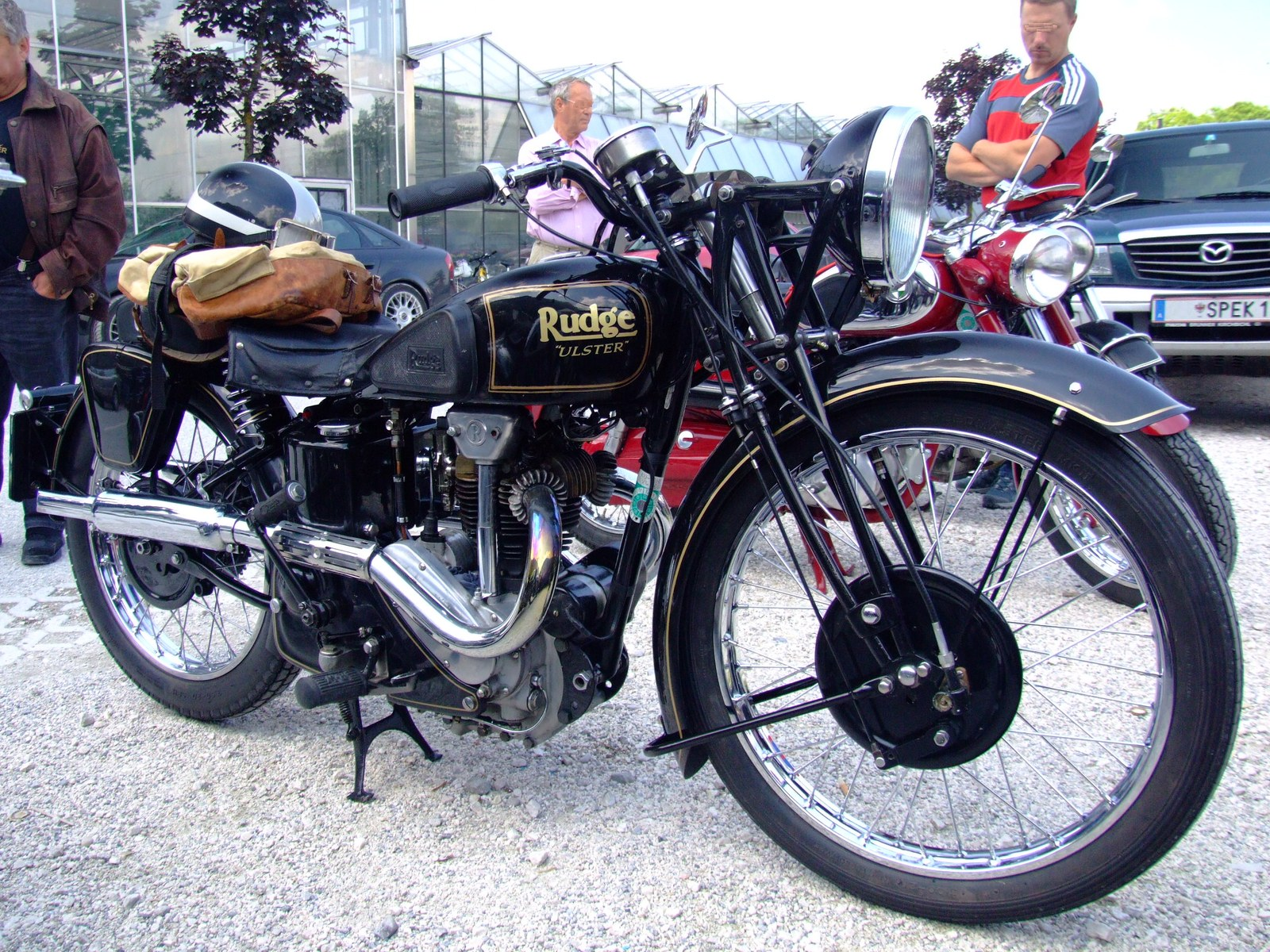
Rudge Ulster

Rudge-Whitworth's last production racing motorcycle was named after Graham Walker's 1928 race win in the Ulster Grand Prix, only the second time a road race had been won at over 80 mph (130 km/h). Graham was the father of racing commentator Murray Walker and was made Rudge Sales Manager in 1929. His win was particularly welcome as he had been unlucky in the Isle of Man TT on the same motorcycle two months earlier, when he narrowly lost the Senior TT race due to oil flow problems on the last lap.

Originally developed as a racing prototype, the production model was essentially a race replica. Various modifications and improvements were made over the ten years of production. Early models had a 'pent roof' four-valve head, with two pairs of valves operating on parallel slopes like a 'pitched roof', which was replaced in 1932 with a radial four-valve head and an option of a foot-operated gear change. This foot pedal operated both the front and rear brakes, with a hand lever also operating the front brake. With a top speed of over 90 mph (140 km/h), the Rudge Ulster was advertised as "probably the fastest 500cc motorcycle in production".

1933 was the era of the Great Depression and Rudge, struggling to make the sales needed to further develop the Ulster, went into receivership. In 1936 EMI (previously the Gramophone Company Ltd. and maker of His Master's Voice records), who were a major creditor, took over and resurrected the Rudge Ulster and moved production to their works in Hayes, Middlesex in 1937. The valve gear, which had always been exposed to the elements was sorted out in 1937, when a cast alloy cover was added - although the bronze cylinder head remained until it was replaced with a light alloy example in 1939. Production ended with the outbreak of the Second World War, when EMI had to put all their resources into the manufacture of Radar and electronic equipment for the war effort. From the days of the Gramophone Company, EMI, had had a policy of diversifying productions into other fields, like typewriters, as a strategy to avoid downturns and recessions.

== Racing success ==
As well as Walker's 1928 Ulster Grand Prix win, in the same year Ernie Nott secured the world two-hour record at over 100 mph (160 km/h) on the Rudge and set further records in 1929. In 1930, under the guidance of team boss George Hack, Nott, Walker, Smith and Wal Handley were on Rudge 500 cc motorcycles for the Isle of Man TT Senior race, Handley winning at a record speed of 74.24 mph (119.48 km/h) with Graham Walker coming second, Smith 6th and Nott 7th, winning the Team Prize for Rudge.
