= Rudge-Whitworth =

British bicycle, motorcycle and sports car manufacturer

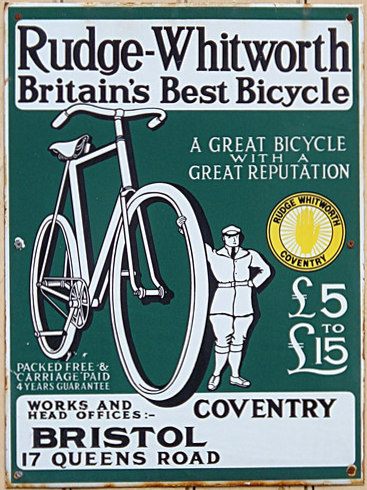
- Predecessor: Rudge Cycle Co, Whitworth Cycle Co
- Founded: 1894 merger of predecessors
- Founder: Daniel Rudge, Charles H Pugh
- Defunct: 1946
- Headquarters: Coventry, Birmingham, United Kingdom
- Key people: C H, C V and John Pugh
- Products: Bicycles, motorcycles, wheels

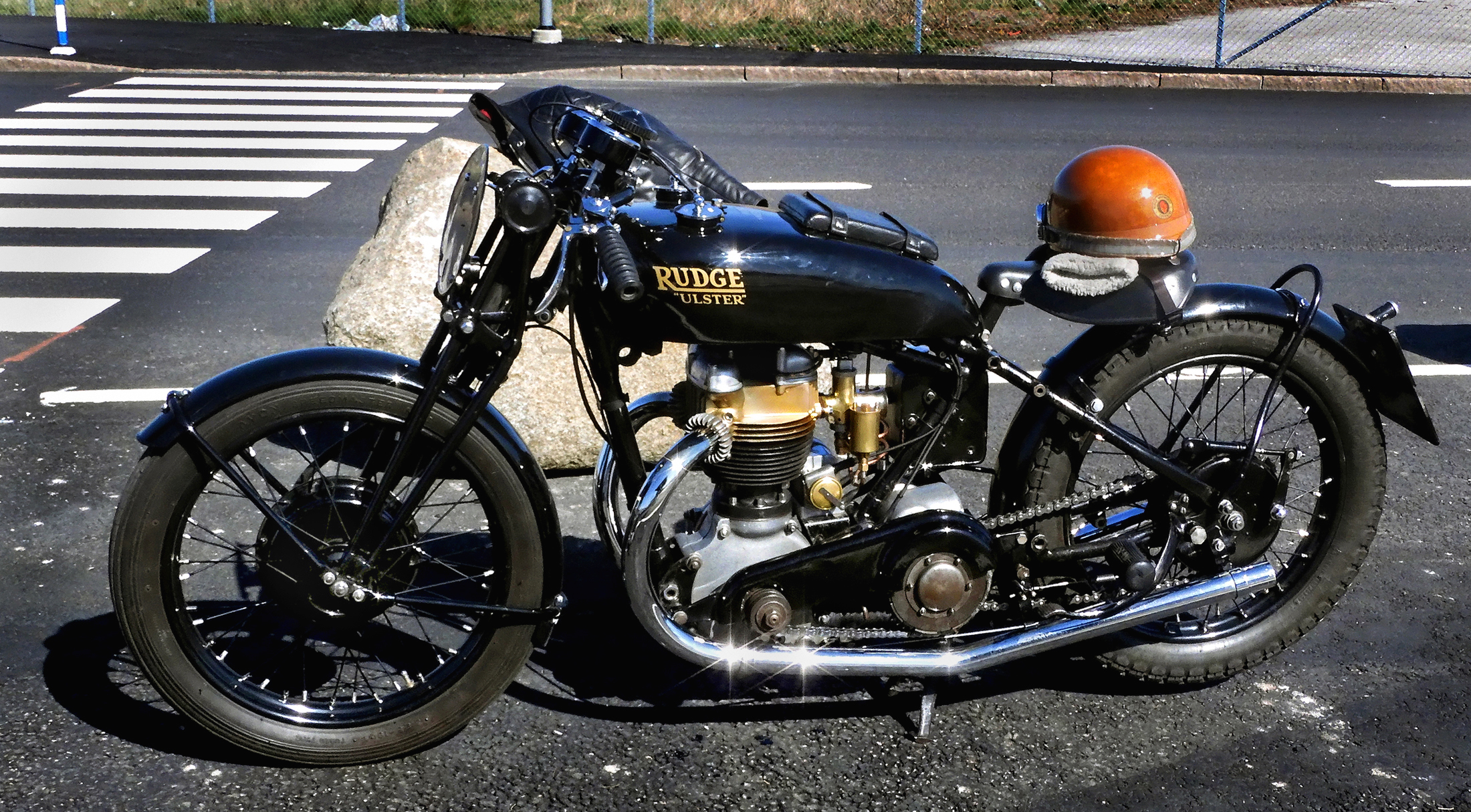
Rudge Ulster 500 cc from 1937 in Ystad on its way to Rønne 2023

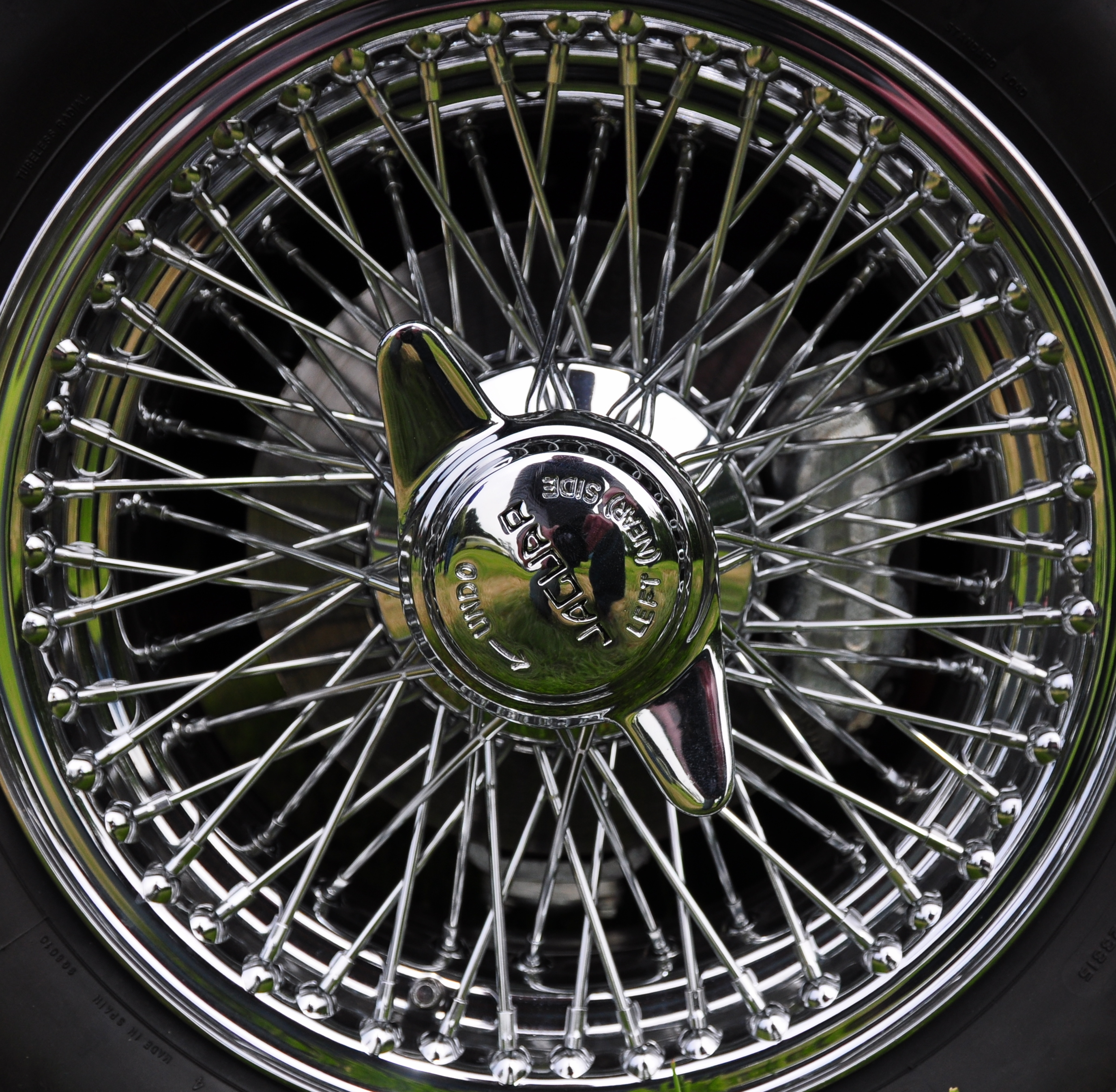
Rudge-Whitworth wire wheel on a Jaguar

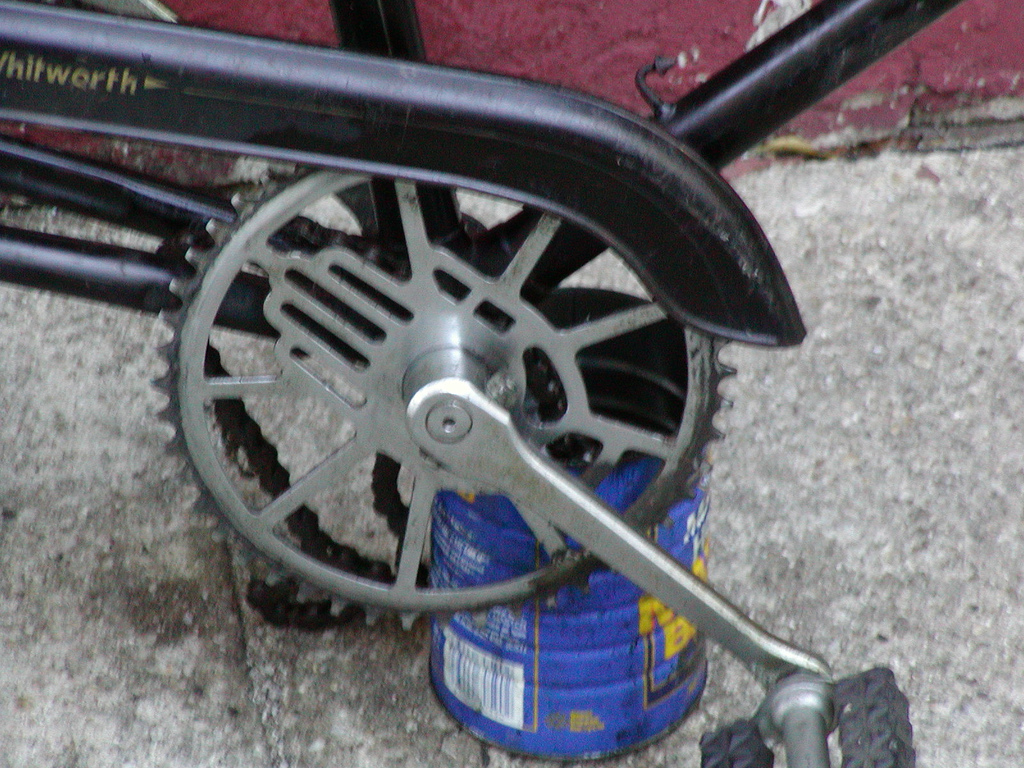
Bicycle chainring with the Rudge-Whitworth hand logo on it

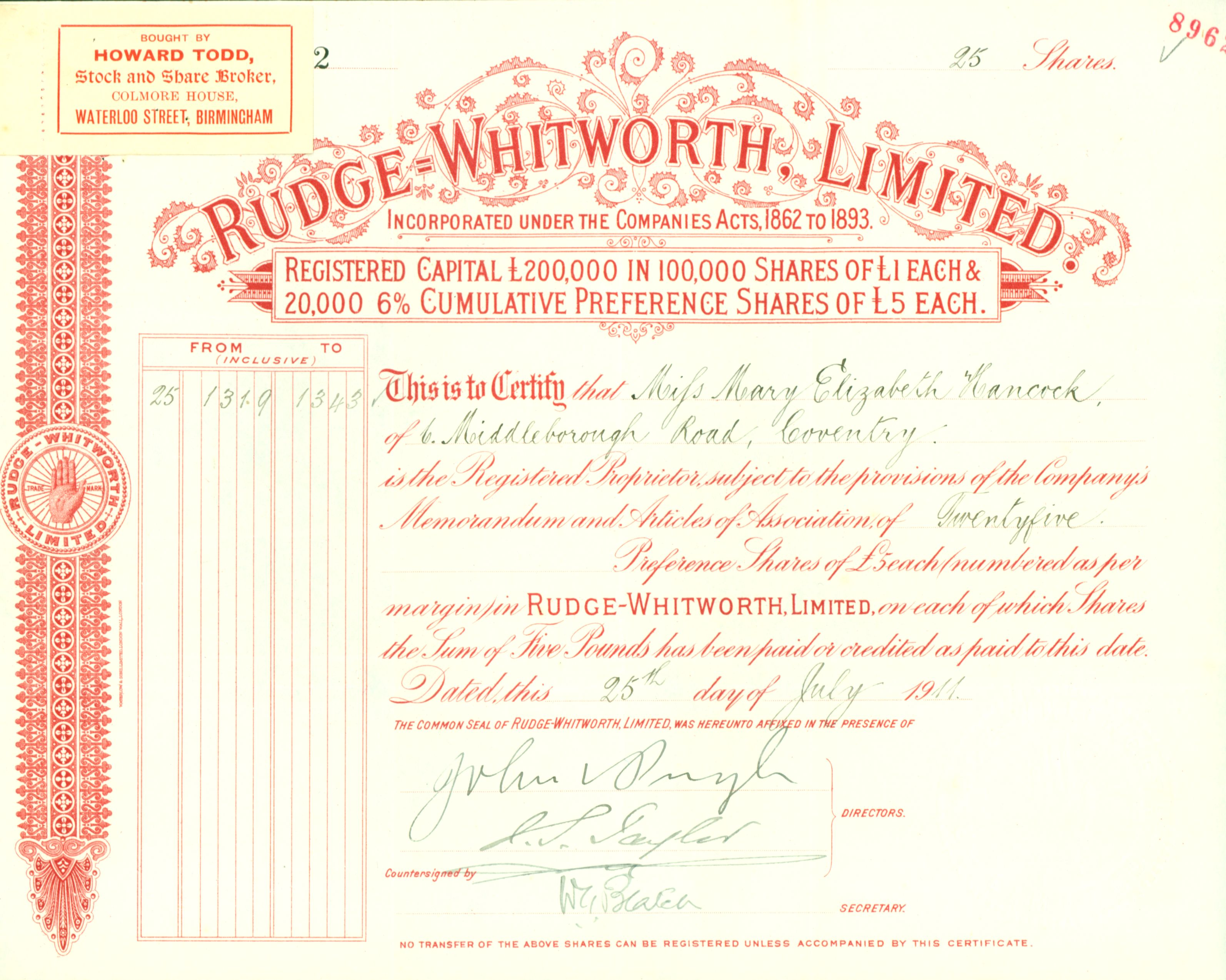
Preferred Share of the Rudge-Withworth Ltd, issued 25. July 1911

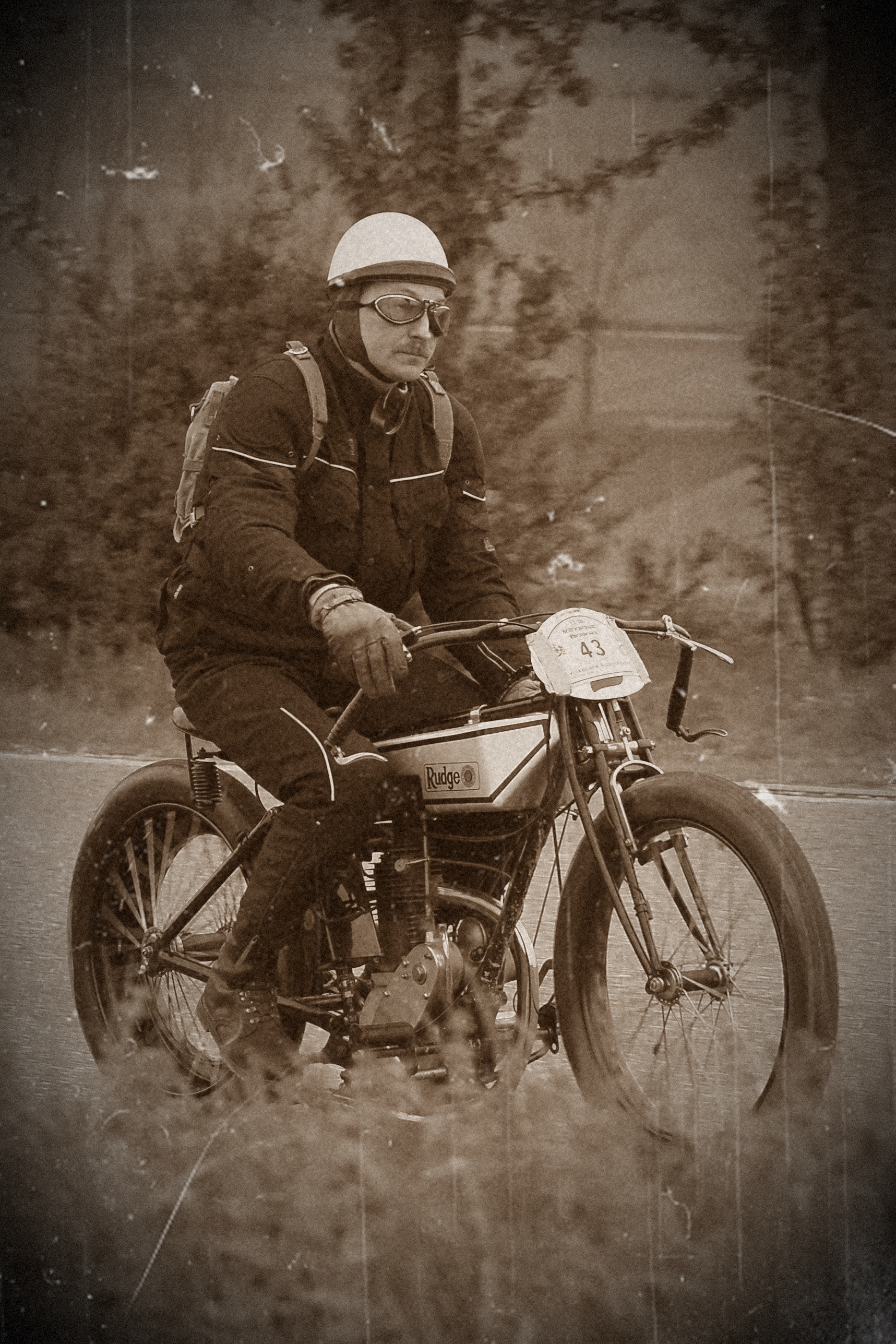
Rudge Multi from 1914

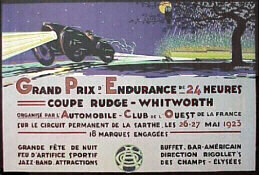
A poster for Rudge-Whitworth wire wheels and their prize for the 1923 24 Hours of Le Mans

Rudge Whitworth Cycles was a British bicycle, bicycle saddle, motorcycle and sports car wheel manufacturer that resulted from the merger of two bicycle manufacturers in 1894, Whitworth Cycle Co. of Birmingham, founded by Charles Henry Pugh and his two sons Charles Vernon and John, and Rudge Cycle Co. of Coventry (which descended from a bicycle company founded by Daniel Rudge of Wolverhampton).

Rudge motorcycles were produced from 1911 to 1946. The firm was known for its innovations in engine and transmission design, and its racing successes. Their sales motto was "Rudge it, do not trudge it."

The company also produced the first detachable wire wheel in 1907, and was known for its knockoff wheels on sports cars; that brand continued well into the 1960s.

== Wire wheels ==
In the early 1900s John Pugh, son of company founder Charles Pugh and a pioneer motorist, decided that there had to be a better way of dealing with punctured tyres than having to change the tyre with the wheel still fixed to the car. In competition with Victor Riley of the Riley Cycle Company they both designed a detachable wheel locked in place by a single large nut. Pugh was granted a patent for his wheel in 1908. There were detailed differences in the design resulting in legal disputes between the two companies over the intellectual rights to the detachable wheel. Pugh eventually lost the dispute following appeal to the House of Lords.

The design of the centerlock hub has three main elements: a splined hub and two mating cones, one at the inner end which centres the wheel and the other incorporated within the nut. These cones serve to centre the wheel on the hub; drive and/or braking torque is transmitted by the hub splines. One of the key features of the Pugh design is that it is self-tightening—the wheels on the right side of the vehicle have a left hand thread on the nut whilst the left side features conventional right-hand threads. If the wheel becomes loose, the theory is for the locking nut to tighten and hold the wheel securely.

The system was taken up enthusiastically by the racing fraternity where the advantage of a quick-change wheel was obvious. At the 1908 Isle of Man TT race, 21 of the 35 entrants used Rudge-Whitworth wheels and only one of the finishers didn't. By 1913, the use of detachable wire wheels was universal in grands prix.

After World War II the rights to the Rudge-Whitworth wheel were acquired by Jaguar Cars.

== Bicycles ==
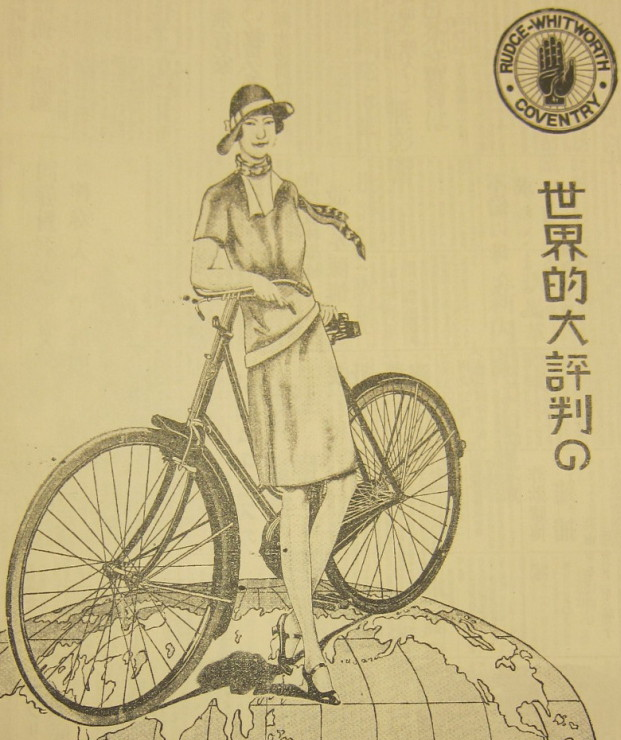
Rudge-Whitworth bicycle ad in Taiwan before 1945

In 1938, Rudge-Whitworth sponsored Billie Fleming to attempt the distance record for the most miles covered in a year. They provided a bicycle with three-speed derailleur gears and a cyclometer, as well as financial support so that she could cycle for 365 days continuously. Her record of 29,603.7 miles (47,642.5 km) still stood at her death, aged 100 in 2014.

== Motorcycles ==
Selling re-badged Werners in 1909, the company went on to produce their first motorcycle in 1911, a single-cylinder F-head 500 cc (31 cu in) bike.

In 1915, a 1,000 cc (61 cu in) bike, using a Jardine four-speed gearbox, was released, followed by a 1000 cc Multigear. In 1923, the company introduced an in-house manufactured 4-speed gearbox to replace the Jardine, and Multigear production ended.

=== Rudge Multigear ===
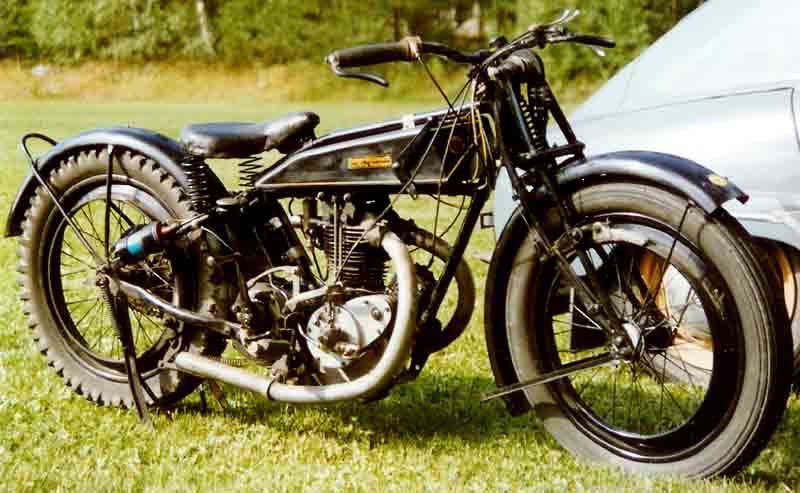
Rudge 500 cc TV 1927

In 1912, the belt-driven 499 cc (30.5 cu in) Multigear was released, using variable groove-depth pulleys to provide 21 forward gear ratios, with top gear as high as 2.75:1. (The Zenith Gradua and 1907 FN 244 cc single used a similar system.) In 1913, a 750 cc (46 cu in) Multigear was released. In 1914, Cyril Pullin won the Isle of Man TT on a Rudge Multigear. Together with the Zenith-Gradua this was one of the first continuously variable transmissions (CVT).

In 1923, Multigear production ended.

=== Rudge Four ===
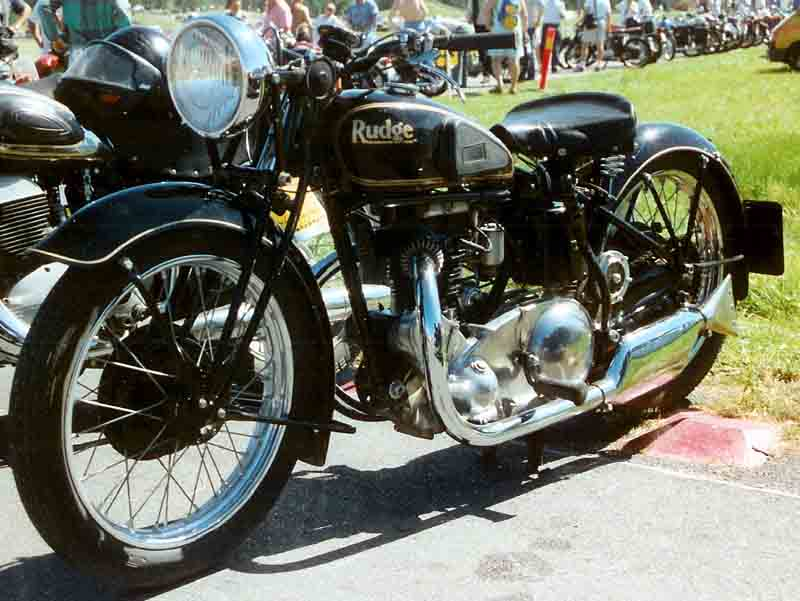
Rudge

The single-cylinder 350 cc (21 cu in) Rudge Four, named for having four speeds and four valves, showed markedly superior performance to the competition on release, having more power than its 500 cc (31 cu in) predecessor. Rudge engineer George Hack is said to have taken his design idea from the four-valve Triumph Ricardo (produced from 1921 to 1928). He designed a four-valve head for Rudge, and in 1924 they produced their first four-valve cylinder head on a 350 cc engine. The valves were arranged in parallel, and were not radial.

In 1925, a 500 cc version with linked front and rear brakes appeared, and the big end bearings were now fed oil through the crankshaft pin. The old 350 cc was dropped in 1926. For 1928 Rudge motorcycles were fitted with saddle tanks, and 8-inch internal expanding drum brakes. Stanley Glanfield designed a Rudge for dirt racing, marketed from 1928 as the Glanfield Rudge.

=== Racing ===
==== Ulster Grand Prix ====
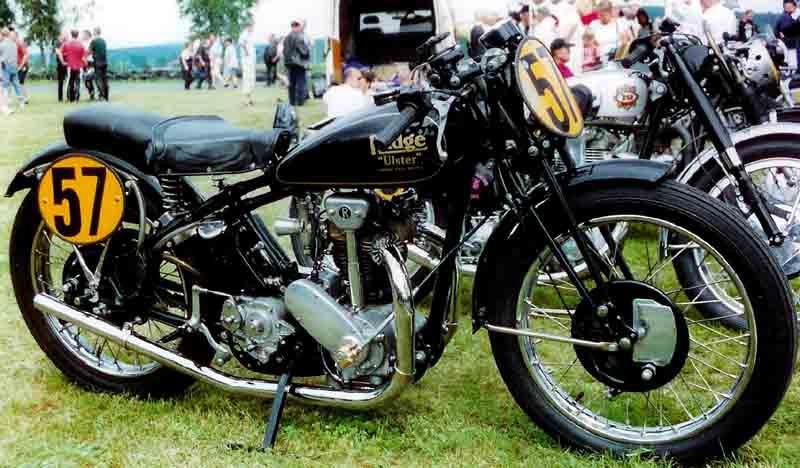
Rudge Ulster 500 cc Racer 1936

In 1928 Graham Walker won the Ulster Grand Prix averaging over 80 mph. This prompted the release of the Rudge Ulster, as well as a JAP-engined 250 cc and parallel 4-valve 350 cc. The Ulster was one of their most famous models.

==== 1930s Isle of Man TT victories ====
Rudge bikes finished first, second and third at the 1930 Junior TT using prototype radial 350 cc 4-valve engines. They also took first and second in the Senior TT. The road bike engines were changed to dry sump lubrication. The JAP 250 and the parallel four-valve 350 cc ended production in this year.

In 1931 Rudge released its first 250 cc and 350 cc road machines with the radial-valve layout. TT Replicas were available in 350 cc and 500 cc. The parallel-valve 500 cc was also available in Special and Ulster models, the Ulster now having a 100 mph guarantee. First and second were taken in the 1931 Lightweight TT, and in 1932, second and third.

A radial-head 500 cc was produced for 1932 only. A 250 cc TT Replica was built, and the road bikes were fitted with proper oil bath primary chains, and a stand that could be operated "with just one finger".

==== Motorcycle speedway ====
During the 1920s and early 1930s, Rudge motorcycles were also popular in motorcycle speedway. Those who rode them during their career included 1938 World Champion Bluey Wilkinson of Australia, who started his speedway career in 1928 on a battered old belt-driven Rudge.

== Rudge Cyclecar ==
Between 1912 and 1913 the company entered the booming cyclecar market. Their car used the Rudge multi-speed transmission, with belt drive throughout, offering ratios ranging from 14 to 1 to 3.5 to 1. The ratios were selected by a lever working in a gate which divided the gear range into ten different ratios. The engine was an air-cooled 750 cc single cylinder engine with a bore of 85mm and stroke of 132mm fitted with a Senspray carburettor. The price in 1912 was 135 guineas.

There are reports that the two seat bodies had the seats staggered to fit in the narrow body, but this is not evident from the photograph taken at the 1912 Olympia Motor Cycle and Cycle Car show.

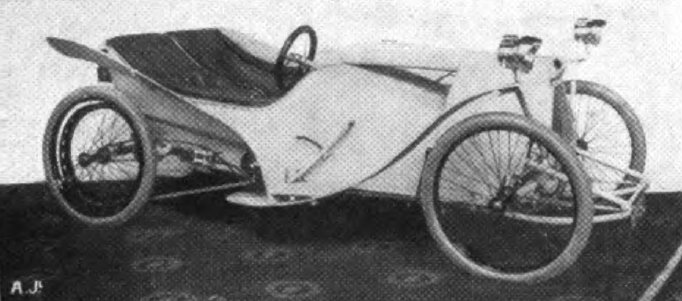
Rudge Cycle Car at 1912 Olympia Show

== Decline ==
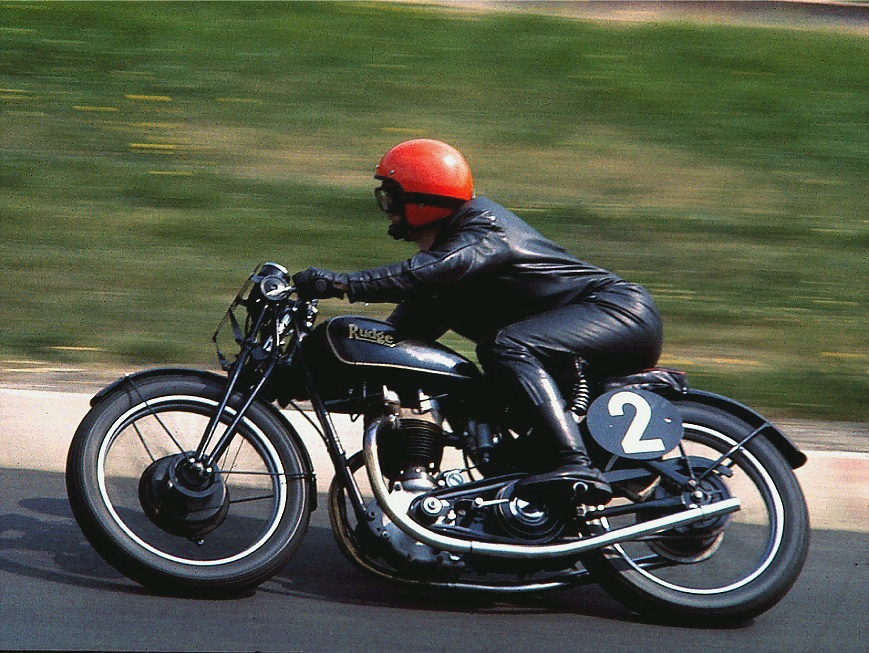
Rudge, 500 cc of 1938

With the depression biting, 1933 was the last year of production for dirt-track bikes, and the TT Replicas. The Ulster 500 cc was fitted with a "semi-radial" (parallel valves with radial ports) cast-iron head. For 1934 the Ulster had its head cast in aluminium bronze, and a radial four-valve 250 cc Sports was released. Rudge motorcycles took the first three places in the 1934 Lightweight TT.

A two-valve 250 cc was produced in 1935, and in 1936 the last of the radial four-valve 250 cc model were produced, while round-tube forks were introduced on other models. In 1937 the valve gear became fully enclosed on the 500 cc models, but finances were bad and Rudge was bought by EMI, and production was interrupted, being moved to Hayes, Hillingdon in Middlesex.

A 250 cc two-valve Sports was released in 1938, and for early 1939 the Ulster had an RR50 aluminium cylinder head. Production ceased in December 1939, to convert to radar production for the war effort.

== See also ==
- List of car manufacturers of the United Kingdom
