= Charles Henry Pugh =

British cycling entrepreneur (1840–1901)

Charles Henry Pugh (6 June 1840 – 9 April 1901) was founder of a British bicycle manufacturer. Charles Henry Pugh was the chairman and managing director of the Whitworth Cycle Co., he was also the chairman of CH. Pugh Ltd. Pugh designed a machine press and specialized steel for making seamless bicycle rims. By 1894 Pugh was the leader of Rudge-Whitworth: a company which became Great Britain’s leading bicycles and motorcycle manufacturer.

== Career ==
Pugh, along with his two sons, Charles Vernon and John, co-founded Whitworth Cycle Co. (later Rudge-Whitworth) of Birmingham. following Charles Henry Pugh's death his sons took the company public, and renamed it Charles H. Pugh Ltd.

In 1921 Charles Henry Pugh's son Charles Vernon Pugh owned a company called the Atlas Chain Company. That company sold the first mass produced gas powered lawn mower. The mower was named the Atco: a name derived from the company name.

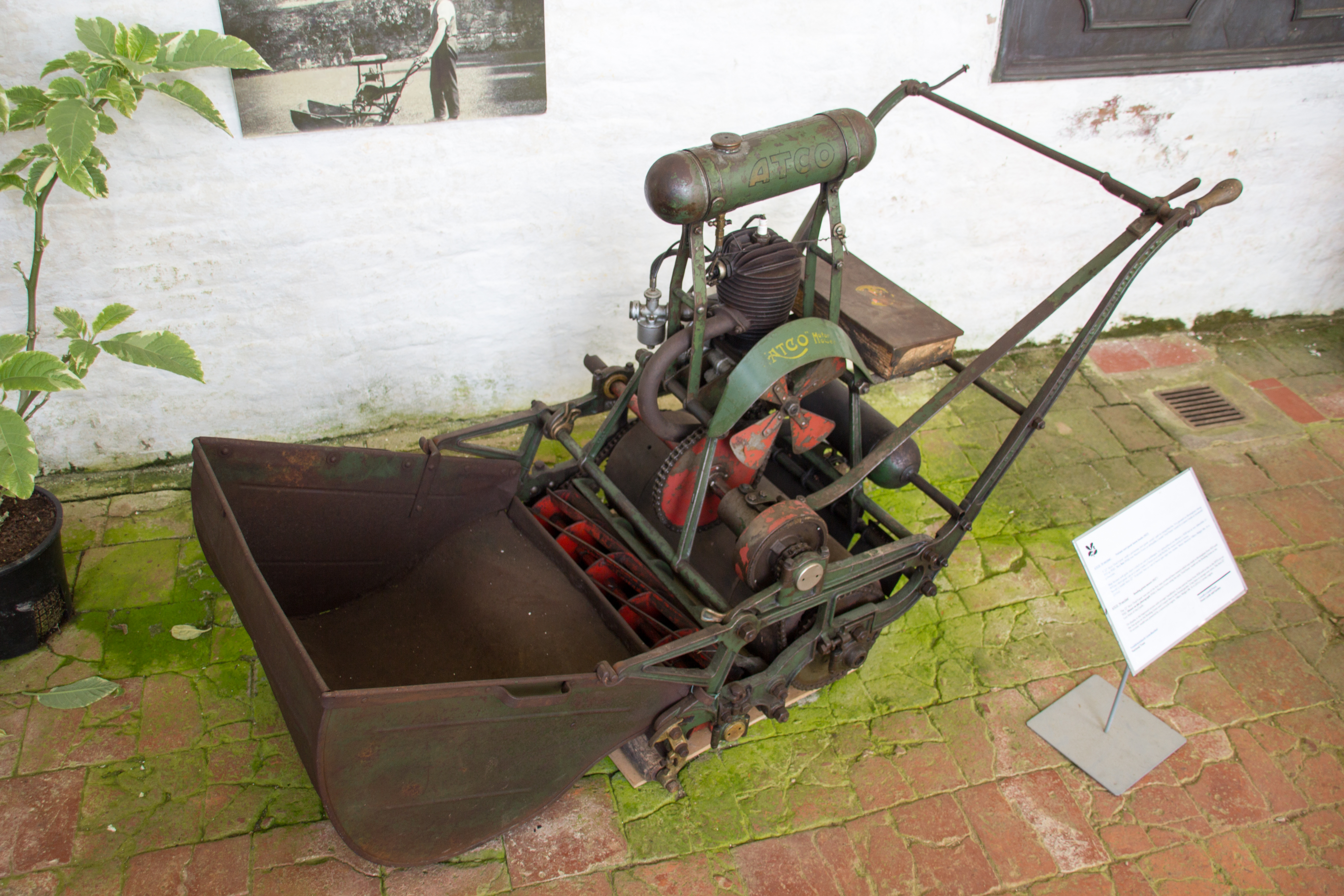
Atco 1932
