= 1964 United States Road Racing Championship =

Seasons
- ← 1963 1965 →

The 1964 United States Road Racing Championship season was the second season of the Sports Car Club of America's United States Road Racing Championship. It began March 1, 1964, and ended September 13, 1964, after ten races. A second GT class for cars under two liters of displacement was added. Separate races for sportscars and GTs were held at eight rounds, while two rounds were combined races. Jim Hall won the season championship.

== Schedule ==
Rnd	Race	Length	Class	Circuit	Location	Date
1	USRRC Augusta	250 km (160 mi)	GT	Augusta International Raceway	Augusta, Georgia	March 1
1	USRRC Augusta	250 km (160 mi)	Sports	Augusta International Raceway	Augusta, Georgia	March 1
2	USRRC Pensacola	150 mi (240 km)	GT	Corry Field	Pensacola, Florida	April 5
2	USRRC Pensacola	220 km (140 mi)	Sports	Corry Field	Pensacola, Florida	April 5
3	Riverside Grand Prix	200 km (120 mi)	GT	Riverside International Raceway	Riverside, California	April 26
3	Riverside Grand Prix	300 km (190 mi)	Sports	Riverside International Raceway	Riverside, California	April 26
4	USRRC Monterey	100 mi (160 km)	GT	Laguna Seca Raceway	Monterey, California	May 3
4	USRRC Monterey	150 mi (240 km)	Sports	Laguna Seca Raceway	Monterey, California	May 3
5	Pacific North West Grand Prix	100 mi (160 km)	GT	Pacific Raceways	Kent, Washington	May 10
5	Pacific North West Grand Prix	150 mi (240 km)	Sports	Pacific Raceways	Kent, Washington	May 10
6	Watkins Glen Sports Car Grand Prix	100 mi (160 km)	GT	Watkins Glen Grand Prix Race Course	Watkins Glen, New York	June 28
6	Watkins Glen Sports Car Grand Prix	200 mi (320 km)	Sports	Watkins Glen Grand Prix Race Course	Watkins Glen, New York	June 28
7	USRRC Greenwood	165 mi (266 km)	All	Greenwood Roadway	Indianola, Iowa	July 19
8	USRRC Meadowdale	120 mi (190 km)	GT	Meadowdale International Raceway	Carpentersville, Illinois	August 9
8	USRRC Meadowdale	170 mi (270 km)	Sports	Meadowdale International Raceway	Carpentersville, Illinois	August 9
9	USRRC Mid-Ohio	100 mi (160 km)	GT	Mid-Ohio Sports Car Course	Lexington, Ohio	August 30
9	USRRC Mid-Ohio	170 mi (270 km)	Sports	Mid-Ohio Sports Car Course	Lexington, Ohio	August 30
10	Road America 500	500 mi (800 km)	All	Road America	Elkhart Lake, Wisconsin	September 13

== Season results ==
Overall winner in bold.

Rnd	Circuit	Sports +2.0 Winning Team	Sports 2.0 Winning Team	GT +2.0 Winning Team	GT 2.0 Winning Team	Results
Rnd	Circuit	Sports +2.0 Winning Driver(s)	Sports 2.0 Winning Driver(s)	GT +2.0 Winning Driver(s)	GT 2.0 Winning Driver(s)	Results
1	Augusta	#97 Shelby American	#77 Scuderia TinCan	#15 Shelby American	Porsche	Results
1	Augusta	(United States) Dave MacDonald	(United States) Charlie Hayes	(United Kingdom) Ken Miles	(United States) Bruce Jennings	Results
2	Pensacola	#66 Chaparral Cars	Lotus	#14 Shelby American	Lotus-Ford	Results
2	Pensacola	(United States) Jim Hall	(United States) Ed Hugus	(United Kingdom) Ken Miles	(United Kingdom) John Whitmore	Results
3	Riverside	#9 Nickey Chevrolet	Frank Arciero	#50 Shelby American	Porsche	Results
3	Riverside	(United States) Skip Hudson	(United States) Bobby Unser	(United Kingdom) Ken Miles	(United States) Scooter Patrick	Results
4	Laguna Seca	#366 Chaparral Cars	#77 Scuderia TinCan	Shelby	Porsche	Results
4	Laguna Seca	(United States) Jim Hall	(United States) Charlie Hayes	(United States) Ed Leslie	(United States) Don Wester	Results
5	Kent	#14 Shelby American	Lotus-Climax	#50 Shelby American	Porsche	Results
5	Kent	(United States) Dave MacDonald	(United States) Tony Settember	(United Kingdom) Ken Miles	(United States) Don Wester	Results
6	Watkins Glen	#66 Chaparral Cars	#71 Scuderia TinCan	#98 Shelby American	Stoddard Racing Team	Results
6	Watkins Glen	(United States) Jim Hall	(United States) Charlie Hayes	(United Kingdom) Ken Miles	(United States) Chuck Stoddard	Results
7	Greenwood	#96 Shelby American	#71 Ed Wechsler	#98 Shelby American	#15 Alan Mann	Results
7	Greenwood	(United States) Ed Leslie	(United States) Bill Wuesthoff	(United Kingdom) Ken Miles	(United Kingdom) John Whitmore	Results
8	Meadowdale	#66 Chaparral Cars	#7 Robert Bosch	#98 Shelby American	Stoddard Racing Team	Results
8	Meadowdale	(United States) Jim Hall	(United States) Joe Buzzetta	(United Kingdom) Ken Miles	(United States) Chuck Stoddard	Results
9	Mid-Ohio	#67 Chaparral Cars	#71 Robert Bosch	#99 Shelby American	#17 Robert Bosch	Results
9	Mid-Ohio	(United States) Hap Sharp	(United States) Bill Wuesthoff	(United States) Bob Johnson	(United States) Bill Wuesthoff	Results
10	Road America	#2 Mecom Racing Team	#79 Edward Weschler, Jr.	#99 Shelby American	#5 Stoddard Racing Team	Results
10	Road America	(United States) Walt Hansgen	(United States) Bill Wuesthoff (United States) Joe Buzzetta	(United States) John Morton (United States) Skip Scott (United Kingdom) Ken Miles	(United States) Chuck Stoddard	Results
