= Shelby Monaco King Cobra =

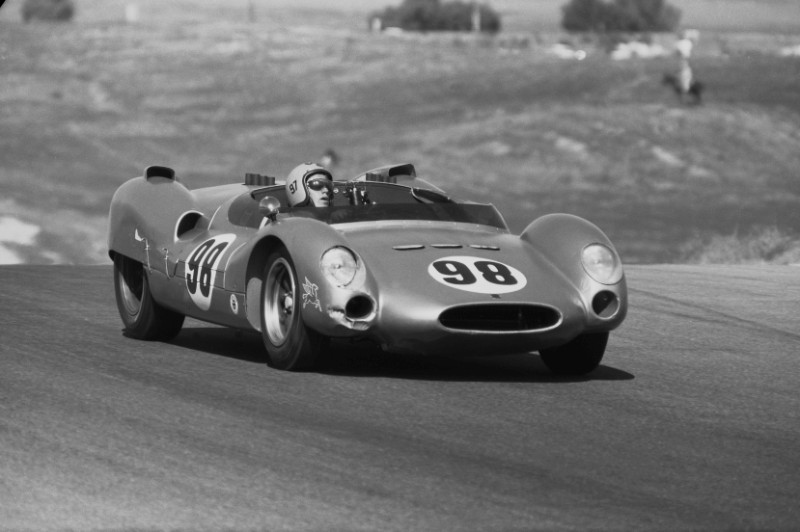
Original 1963 version

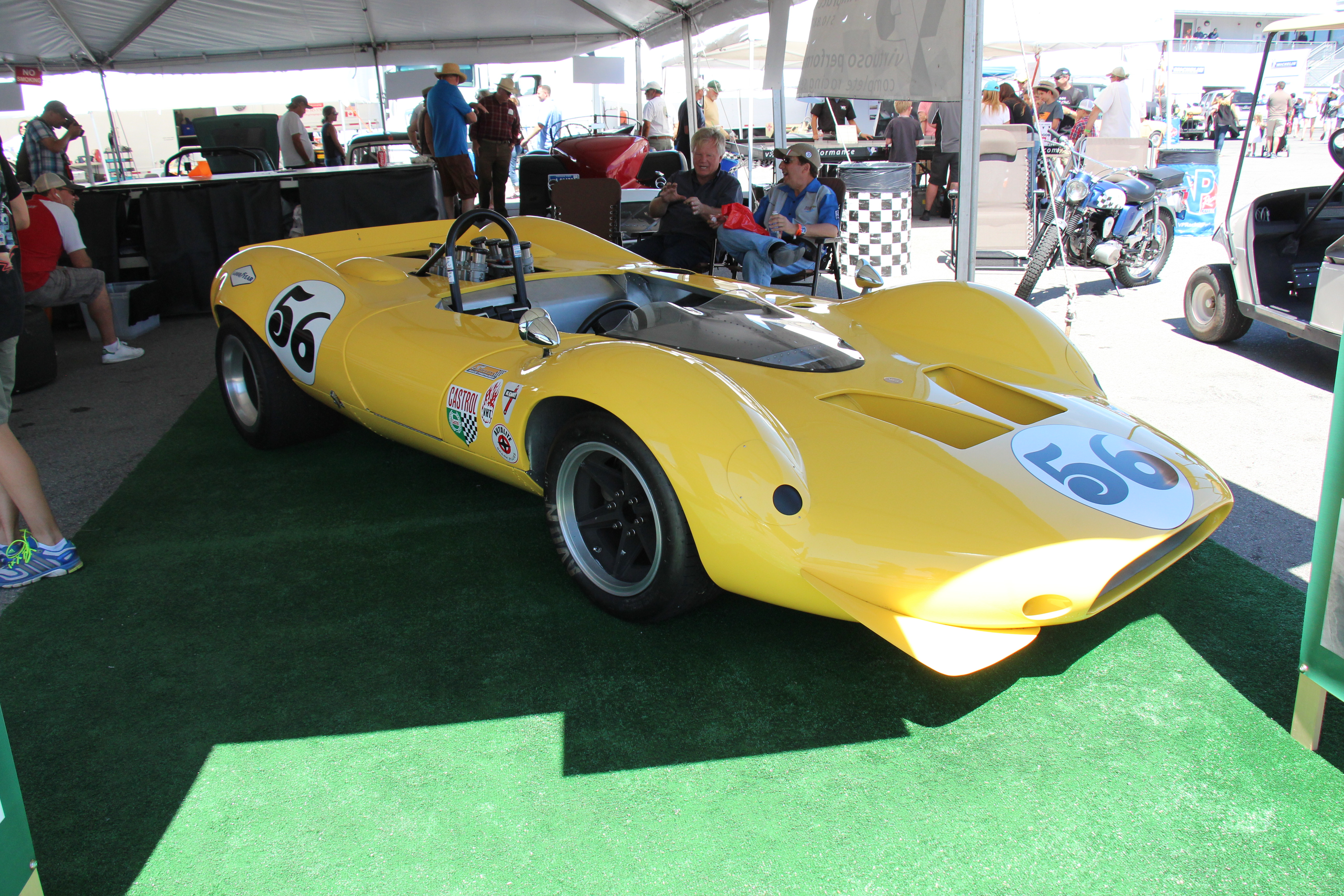
Later Len Terry-designed 1967 Can-Am version

The Shelby Monaco King Cobra, also known simply as the Shelby King Cobra, is a specially modified series of purpose-built sports racing cars, that competed in both the United States Road Racing Championship and the Can-Am series, between 1963 and 1967. It dominated and won the championship three consecutive years in a row (1963, 1964, 1965). The chassis and body were based around a lightweight Cooper T61 Monaco sports car, but the existing Coventry Climax 2.0 L (120 cu in) four-cylinder engine was swapped out for a 289 cu in (4.74 L) Ford Windsor small-block engine, which produced 400 hp (300 kW), and 314 lb⋅ft (426 N⋅m) of torque, which drove the rear wheels through a 5-speed manual transmission. Since the car only weighed 1,400 lb (640 kg), this gave it an incredible power-to-weight ratio, and top speed. The later 1967 Can-Am version of the car was even more powerful, with 520 hp (390 kW), and 503 lb⋅ft (682 N⋅m) of torque, coming from an enlarged 352 cu in (5.77 L) Ford XE motor.
