= 1963 United States Road Racing Championship =

Seasons
- ← none 1964 →

The 1963 United States Road Racing Championship season was the first season of the Sports Car Club of America's United States Road Racing Championship. It began February 3, 1963, and ended September 22, 1963, after eight races. Separate races for sportscars and GTs were held at four rounds, while three rounds were combined races, and one round (Daytona) was for sportscars only. Bob Holbert won the season championship, splitting time between the under-two liter sportscar and GT classes.

== Schedule ==
| Rnd | Race | Length | Class | Circuit | Location | Date |
|---|---|---|---|---|---|---|
| 1 | Daytona 200 | 200 mi (320 km) | Sports | Daytona International Speedway | Daytona Beach, Florida | February 3 |
| 2 | USRRC Pensacola | 150 mi (240 km) | GT | Corry Field | Pensacola, Florida | May 26 |
| 2 | USRRC Pensacola | 260 mi (420 km) | Sports | Corry Field | Pensacola, Florida | May 26 |
| 3 | Laguna Seca 150 | 150 mi (240 km) | All | Laguna Seca Raceway | Monterey, California | June 9 |
| 4 | Watkins Glen Sports Car Grand Prix | 150 mi (240 km) | GT | Watkins Glen Grand Prix Race Course | Watkins Glen, New York | June 30 |
| 4 | Watkins Glen Sports Car Grand Prix | 300 km (190 mi) | Sports | Watkins Glen Grand Prix Race Course | Watkins Glen, New York | June 30 |
| 5 | Pacific North West Grand Prix | 150 mi (240 km) | GT | Pacific Raceways | Kent, Washington | July 21 |
| 5 | Pacific North West Grand Prix | 150 mi (240 km) | Sports | Pacific Raceways | Kent, Washington | July 21 |
| 6 | Continental Divide 150 | 150 mi (240 km) | All | Continental Divide Raceway | Castle Rock, Colorado | August 18 |
| 7 | Road America 500 | 500 mi (800 km) | All | Road America | Elkhart Lake, Wisconsin | September 8 |
| 8 | USRRC Mid-Ohio | 270 km (170 mi) | GT | Mid-Ohio Sports Car Course | Lexington, Ohio | September 22 |
| 8 | USRRC Mid-Ohio | 270 km (170 mi) | Sports | Mid-Ohio Sports Car Course | Lexington, Ohio | September 22 |

== Season results ==
Overall winner in bold.

| Rnd | Circuit | Sports +2.0 Winning Team | Sports 2.0 Winning Team | GT Winning Team | Results |
| Rnd | Circuit | Sports +2.0 Winning Driver(s) | Sports 2.0 Winning Driver(s) | GT Winning Driver(s) | Results |
|---|---|---|---|---|---|
| 1 | Daytona | **#166 Hap Sharp** | #14 Porsche | Did Not Participate | Results |
| 1 | Daytona | **(United States) Jim Hall** | (United States) Bob Holbert | | Results |
| 2 | Pensacola | Lotus-Climax | **#14 Porsche** | Mecom Racing Team | Results |
| 2 | Pensacola | (United States) Tim Mayer | **(United States) Bob Holbert** | (United States) Roger Penske | Results |
| 3 | Laguna Seca | #92 Team Meridian Inc. | **#10 Chuck Parsons** | #196 Shelby American | Results |
| 3 | Laguna Seca | (United States) Skip Hudson | **(United States) Chuck Parsons** | (United States) Bob Holbert | Results |
| 4 | Watkins Glen | #98 Shelby American | **#14 Porsche** | #33 Bob Johnson | Results |
| 4 | Watkins Glen | (United Kingdom) Ken Miles | **(United States) Bob Holbert** | (United States) Bob Johnson | Results |
| 5 | Kent | **#448 Kjell Qvale** | Porsche | #97 Shelby American | Results |
| 5 | Kent | **(Mexico) Pedro Rodríguez** | (United States) Don Wester | (United States) Dave MacDonald | Results |
| 6 | Castle Rock | **#14 Meister Brauser** | Porsche | #98 Shelby American | Results |
| 6 | Castle Rock | **(United States) Augie Pabst** | (United States) Don Wester | (United States) Bob Bondurant | Results |
| 7 | Road America | #98 Williamson Ford, Inc. | **#76 Porsche Car Import/Oliver Schmidt** | #97 Steve McQueen/Shelby American | Results |
| 7 | Road America | (United States) Bob Holbert (United Kingdom) Ken Miles | **(United States) Augie Pabst** **(United States) Bill Wuesthoff** | (United States) Bob Bondurant (United States) Dave MacDonald | Results |
| 8 | Mid-Ohio | **#98 Shelby American** | #89 Porsche | #99 Shelby American | Results |
| 8 | Mid-Ohio | **(United Kingdom) Ken Miles** | (United States) Herb Swan | (United States) Bob Holbert | Results |
