= 1965 United States Road Racing Championship =

Seasons
- ← 1964 1966 →

The 1965 United States Road Racing Championship season was the third season of the Sports Car Club of America's United States Road Racing Championship. It began April 11, 1965, and ended September 5, 1965, after nine races. Separate races for sportscars and GTs were held at two rounds, while seven rounds were combined races. George Follmer won the season championship driving in the Under-2 Liter class.

== Schedule ==
Rnd	Race	Length	Class	Circuit	Location	Date
1	USRRC Pensacola	200 mi (320 km)	All	Corry Field	Pensacola, Florida	April 11
2	USRRC Riverside	200 km (120 mi)	GT	Riverside International Raceway	Riverside, California	May 2
2	USRRC Riverside	300 km (190 mi)	Sports	Riverside International Raceway	Riverside, California	May 2
3	USRRC Monterey	100 mi (160 km)	GT	Laguna Seca Raceway	Monterey, California	May 9
3	USRRC Monterey	150 mi (240 km)	Sports	Laguna Seca Raceway	Monterey, California	May 9
4	Vanderbilt Cup	215 mi (346 km)	All	Bridgehampton Race Circuit	Bridgehampton, New York	May 23
5	Watkins Glen Sports Car Grand Prix	200 mi (320 km)	All	Watkins Glen Grand Prix Race Course	Watkins Glen, New York	June 27
6	Pacific North West Grand Prix	250 km (160 mi)	All	Pacific Raceways	Kent, Washington	August 1
7	USRRC Continental Divide	200 mi (320 km)	All	Continental Divide Raceway	Castle Rock, Colorado	August 15
8	USRRC Mid-Ohio	200 mi (320 km)	All	Mid-Ohio Sports Car Course	Lexington, Ohio	August 29
9	Road America 500	500 mi (800 km)	All	Road America	Elkhart Lake, Wisconsin	September 5

== Season results ==
Overall winner in bold.

Rnd	Circuit	Sports +2.0 Winning Team	Sports 2.0 Winning Team	GT +2.0 Winning Team	GT 2.0 Winning Team	Results
Rnd	Circuit	Sports +2.0 Winning Driver(s)	Sports 2.0 Winning Driver(s)	GT +2.0 Winning Driver(s)	GT 2.0 Winning Driver(s)	Results
1	Pensacola	#4 Skip Lehmann	**#16 Trans Ocean Motors**	#96 Shelby American	Porsche	Results
1	Pensacola	(United States) Mike Hall	**(United States) George Follmer**	(United States) Tom Payne	(United States) Charlie Kolb	Results
2	Riverside	**#66 Chaparral Cars**	#16 Trans Ocean Motors	Shelby American	Porsche	Results
2	Riverside	**(United States) Jim Hall**	(United States) George Follmer	(United Kingdom) Ken Miles	(United States) Scooter Patrick	Results
3	Laguna Seca	**#66 Chaparral Cars**	#28 Enduro Speed, Inc.	Shelby American	Porsche	Results
3	Laguna Seca	**(United States) Jim Hall**	(United States) Gerry Bruihl	(United Kingdom) Ken Miles	(United States) Scooter Patrick	Results
4	Bridgehampton	**#66 Chaparral Cars**	#16 Trans Ocean Motors	#33 Shelby American	#14 Porsche	Results
4	Bridgehampton	**(United States) Jim Hall**	(United States) George Follmer	(United States) Bob Johnson	(United States) George Drolsom	Results
5	Watkins Glen	**#65 Chaparral Cars**	#16 Trans Ocean Motors	#33 Shelby American	#14 Herb Wetanson	Results
5	Watkins Glen	**(United States) Jim Hall**	(United States) George Follmer	(United States) Bob Johnson	(United States) Herb Wetanson	Results
6	Kent	**#66 Chaparral Cars**	Elva-Porsche	#13 Shelby American	Porsche	Results
6	Kent	**(United States) Jim Hall**	(United States) Jerry Titus	(United States) Tom Payne	(United States) Scooter Patrick	Results
7	Castle Rock	**#65 Chaparral Cars**	#16 Trans Ocean Motors	#33 Shelby American	Porsche	Results
7	Castle Rock	**(United States) Hap Sharp**	(United States) George Follmer	(United States) Bob Johnson	(United States) Scooter Patrick	Results
8	Mid-Ohio	**#65 Chaparral Cars**	#23 Lotus	#19 Shelby	#18 Abarth-Simca	Results
8	Mid-Ohio	**(United States) Hap Sharp**	(United States) Doug Revson	(United States) Dan Gerber	(United States) Ray Cuomo	Results
9	Road America	**#66 Chaparral Cars**	#16 Trans Ocean Motors	#13 Shelby American	#5 Stoddard Racing Team	Results
9	Road America	**(United States) Jim Hall** **(United States) Hap Sharp** **(United States) Ronnie Hissom**	(United States) George Follmer (United States) Earl Jones	(United States) Tom Payne (United States) Ray Cuomo	(United States) Chuck Stoddard	Results
