= Center for Information Warfare Training =

One of eleven learning centers of U.S. Naval Education and Training Command

Coordinates: 30.4017°N 87.2900°W

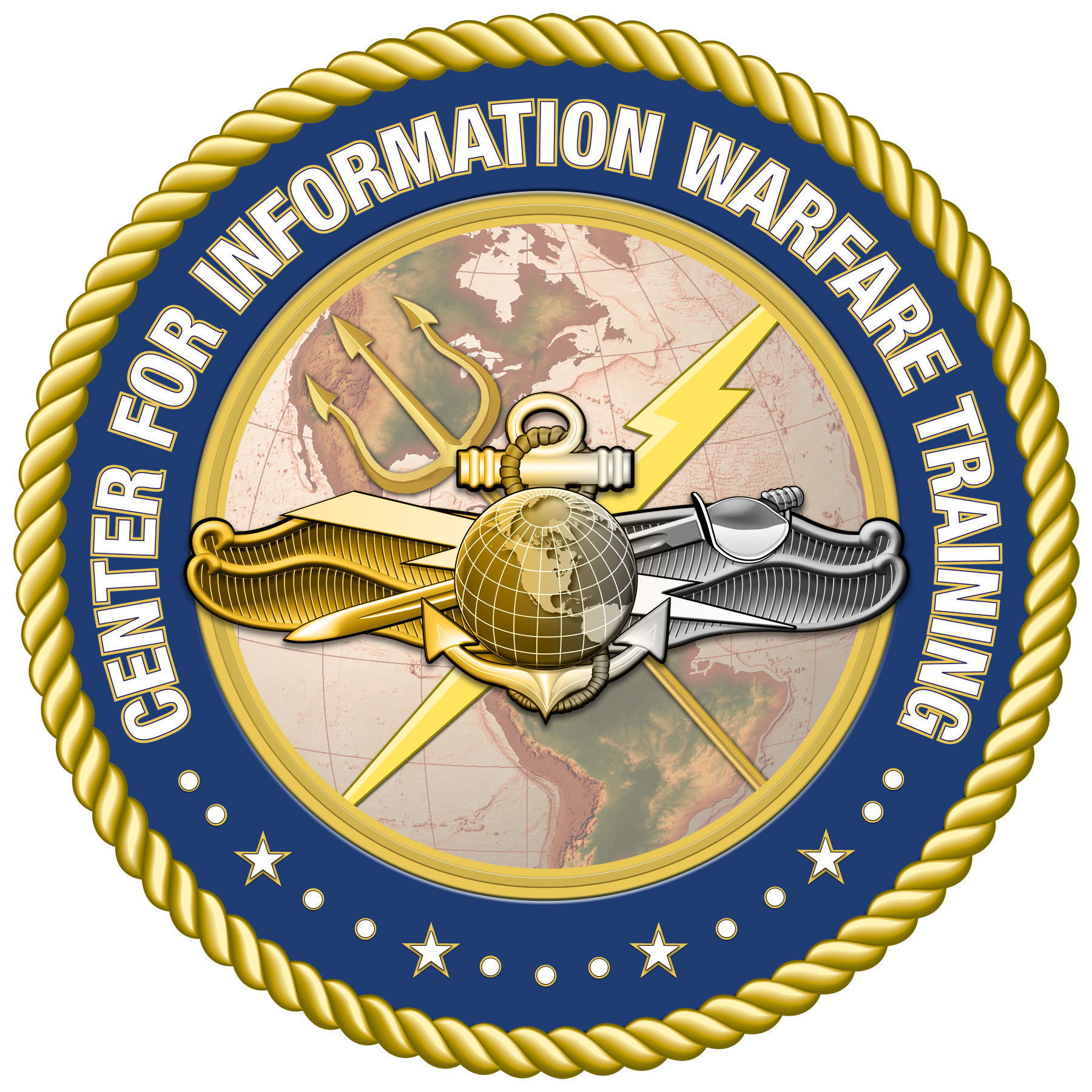
- Center for Information Warfare Training logo
- Active: Active
- Country: United States
- Branch: United States Navy
- Type: Naval Education and Training Command Learning Center
- Role: Training and education of naval information warfare forces
- Size: staff: 1,200; student: 26,000 (annual)
- Part of: Naval Education and Training Command
- HQ: Corry Station, Escambia County, Florida
- Mottos: Developing the right workforce through education and training
- Website: www.netc.navy.mil/CIWT/

Commanders
- Commanding Officer: Captain John Copeland
- Executive Officer: Commander Kyle Bachman
- Executive Director: William "Doug" Pfeifle
- Command Master Chief: Command Master Chief Petty Officer Damien Pulvino

The United States Navy's Center for Information Warfare Training (CIWT) is one of the learning centers of Naval Education and Training Command, headquartered on Naval Air Station Pensacola Corry Station in Escambia County, Florida. It is responsible for the development of education and training policies for over 26,000 members of the Information Warfare Corps in the fields of cryptology and intelligence, along with the cyber realms of information operations and technology, and computer systems and networks. The center also oversees Language, Regional Expertise and Culture.

The Center administers about 200 courses across the globe with an average of 4,000 students attending daily courses and an annual student count of roughly 26,000, with a staff of nearly 1,200 military, civilian and contracted staff.

All of CIWT's learning sites operate under one of four "schoolhouse commands, each which specializes in a different concentration. Each schoolhouse has its own leadership team (CO/XO/CMC) and operates independently of one another.

Information Warfare Training Command Corry Station focuses on cryptologic technician (CTT/CTR/CTM), cyber warfare technician (CWT) and information systems technician (IT) enlisted "A" and "C" schools and cryptologic warfare and information professional officer courses.

- Information Warfare Training Site Keesler
- Information Warfare Training Site Fort Gordon

Information Warfare Training Command Monterey specializes in training language training for cryptologic technician (CTI) Navy linguists, the special warfare community, Personnel Exchange Program, and foreign area officers through Defense Language Institute, Presidio of Monterey, California.

- Detachment Goodfellow
- Information Warfare Training Site Washington D.C.

Information Warfare Training Command San Diego provides training for cryptologic technician (CTM, CTT), electronics technician (ET), intelligence specialist (IS), and information systems technician (IT) and information warfare officer courses.

- Information Warfare Training Site Hawaii
- Information Warfare Training Site Pacific Northwest
- Information Warfare Training Site Yokosuka

Information Warfare Training Command Virginia Beach provides training for cryptologic technician (CTT), electronics technician (ET), intelligence specialist (IS), and information systems technician (IT) and information warfare officer courses.

- Detachment Groton
- Information Warfare Training Site Jacksonville
- Information Warfare Training Site Kings Bay
- Information Warfare Training Site Mayport

The center had previously been called the Center for Information Dominance; its name was changed in 2016.
