= United States Road Racing Championship =

American road racing series

- Sport: Sports car racing
- Jurisdiction: United States
- Abbreviation: USRRC
- Founded: 1962 (original); 1998 (revival)
- Owner: Sports Car Club of America
- Headquarters: Denver, Colorado
- President: Ed Bennett
- Closure date: 1968 (original); 1999 (revival)
- Fate: Merged with the Grand American Road Racing Association

The United States Road Racing Championship (USRRC) was a Sports Car Club of America series for professional racing drivers. SCCA Executive Director John Bishop helped to create the series in 1962 to recover races that had been taken by rival USAC Road Racing Championship, a championship that folded after the 1962 season. For its first three seasons, the series featured both open-topped sports cars and GT cars. Ford and Porsche dominated the Over- and Under-2 Liter classes, respectively. The USRRC ran from 1963 until 1968 when it was abandoned in favor of the more successful Can-Am series, which was also run by the SCCA.

In 1998, the USRRC name was revived by the SCCA as an alternative to the IMSA GT Championship, and revived the Can-Am name for its top class. For 1999, the series reached an agreement with the International Sports Racing Series in Europe, in which the two series would share the same rules for prototypes. Entries for the series were sparse, and the final two rounds were cancelled. At the end of 1999, the series was taken over by the new Grand American Road Racing Association (GARRA) and the championship was reborn as the Grand American Road Racing Championship (Grand-Am), also known as the Rolex Sports Car Series. In 2014, Grand-Am and the American Le Mans Series merged to form the WeatherTech SportsCar Championship.

== Champions ==
Season	Driver	GT Makes
1963	(United States) Bob Holbert	(United States) AC Cobra Ford
1964	(United States) Jim Hall	(United States) Shelby American Ford
1965	(United States) George Follmer	(United States) Shelby American Ford
1966	(United States) Chuck Parsons	(United States) Ford
1967	(United States) Mark Donohue	(United States) Ford
1968	(United States) Mark Donohue	(United States) Ford

=== USRRC champions ===
Season	Can-Am	GT1	GT2	GT3
1998	(United Kingdom) James Weaver	(Belgium) Thierry Boutsen	(United States) Scott Sansone (United States) Cameron Worth	(Canada) Ross Bentley
1999	(United States) Elliott Forbes-Robinson (United States) Butch Leitzinger	no title	(United States) Larry Schumacher (United States) John O'Steen	(United States) Cort Wagner
