= Greenwood Roadway =

1963-1966 racetrack in Warren County, Iowa

Coordinates: 41.2540°N 93.4956°W

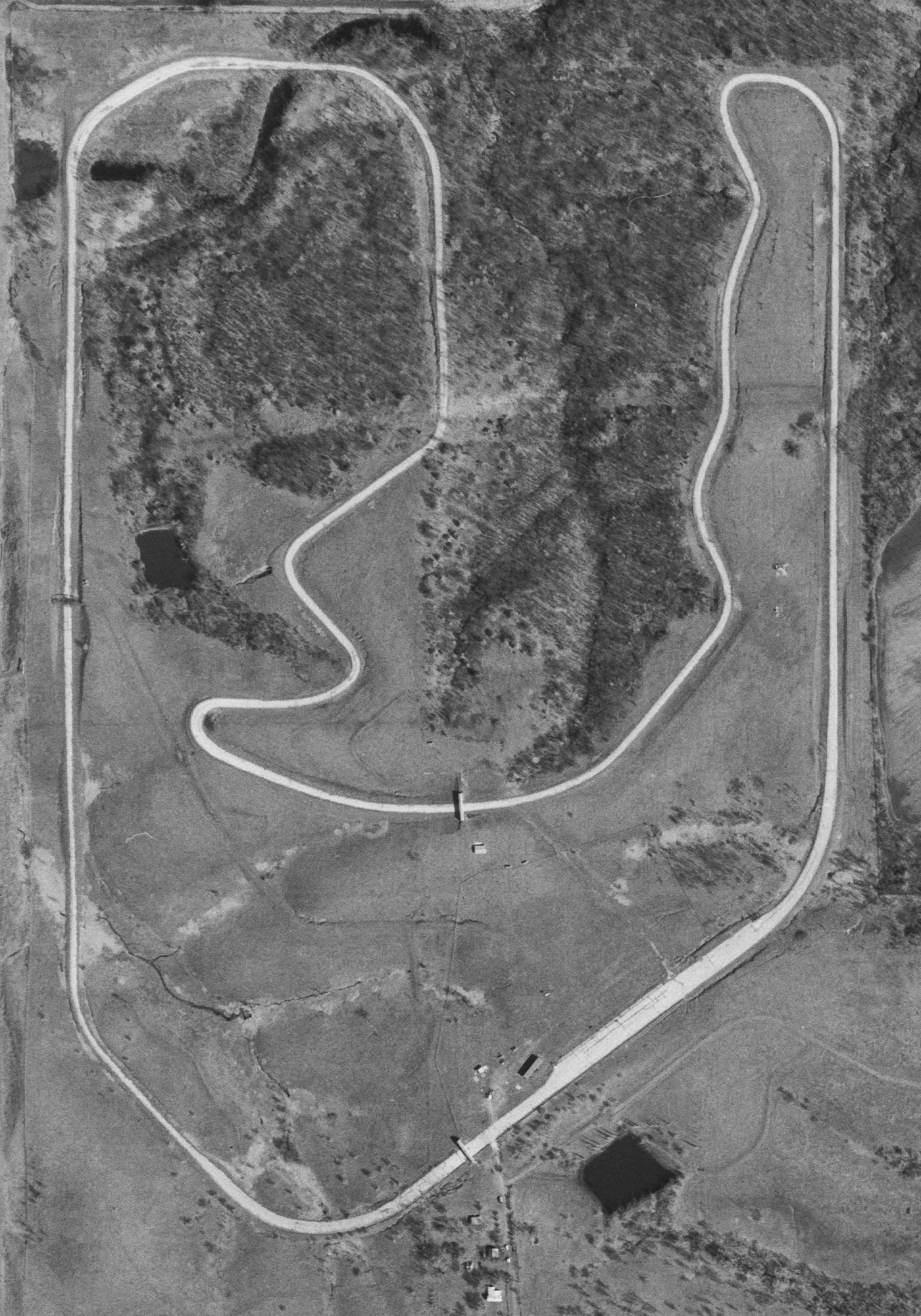
Aerial photo of Greenwood Roadway in 1980

Greenwood Roadway was an auto and motorcycle paved racetrack located in Otter Township, Warren County, 28 miles (45 km) south of Des Moines, Iowa, on Highway 65. It was only open from 1963 to 1966, but it managed to host several major auto racing events, including several Sports Car Club of America races and one round of the United States Road Racing Championship, the predecessor to the Can-Am series. Other major events included AMA National Championship motorcycle races and a round of the United States Auto Club stock car series.

Greenwood Roadway was a 3.0-mile (4.8 km) long track with varying widths from 24 to 65 feet (7.3 to 19.8 m).

When it was built, the roadway was to be one of the premier road racing tracks in the United States. However, poor spectator access and a lack of sufficient seating hindered the track's attendance. Plagued by pavement problems and little revenue, the operators of the track were forced to close it down.
