= Jim Hall (racing driver) =

American racing driver (born 1935)

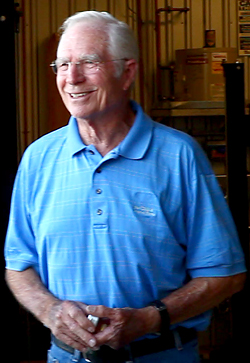
- Jim Hall in 2013 Hall in 2013
- Born: July 23, 1935 (age 91); Abilene, Texas, United States

Formula One World Championship career
- Nationality: (United States) American
- Active years: 1960 - 1963
- Team: non-works Lotus
- Entries: 12 (11 starts)
- Championships: 0
- Wins: 0
- Podiums: 0
- Career points: 3
- Pole positions: 0
- Fastest laps: 0
- First entry: 1960 United States Grand Prix
- Last entry: 1963 Mexican Grand Prix

James Ellis Hall (born July 23, 1935) is a retired American racing driver, race car constructor, and team owner. While he is best known as a car constructor, he was one of the greatest American racing drivers of his generation, capturing consecutive United States Road Racing Championships (1964, 1965), two Road America 500s (1962, 1964), two Watkins Glen Grands Prix for sports cars (1964, 1965), the 1965 Canadian Grand Prix for sports cars, the 1965 Pacific Northwest Grand Prix, and scoring a massive upset at the 1965 12 Hours of Sebring over a contingent of factory-backed Ford GTs, Shelby Daytona Coupes, and Ferrari entries. If anything Hall's accomplishments behind the wheel have been overshadowed by his pivotal contributions to race car design through his series of Chaparral sports racing and Indy cars. Hall's cars won in every series in which they competed: USRRC, Can-Am, Trans-Am, Formula 5000, World Sportscar Championship, Autoweek Championship, Canadian Sports Car Championship, and the Indianapolis 500.

== Background ==
Hall was born in Abilene and raised in Colorado and New Mexico. While studying engineering at the California Institute of Technology, he began racing in local sports car events. After a promised job at General Motors to work on the Corvette failed to materialize due to a late ‘50s U.S. recession, he became involved with older brother Dick in Carroll Shelby Sport Cars in Dallas, the area’s leading importer of European road and race vehicles. This experience played a crucial role in his development as a driver and helped the dealership sell cars. Shelby would put Hall in one of the new racers and often as not, Hall would go out and win in it. Shelby would then brag that if a rookie could win in it, it must be a pretty outstanding piece of machinery. Soon, however, fans across the Southwest started to recognize that Hall was one of the most promising young drivers on the American racing scene.

Hall's abilities drew international attention at the 1960 United States Grand Prix at Riverside. Driving his own past-its-prime Lotus-Climax, he ran a surprising fifth for much of the race until the differential started to give way a few laps from the end. Of Hall's run, Competition Press (now Autoweek) wrote, “It looks as if Texas has another international caliber driver ready to take Carroll Shelby’s place now that Shelby has announced his retirement.”

At Riverside, Hall was approached by California car builders Troutman and Barnes who were seeking funding for a new front-mid-engined, two-seat road racer. Hall backed the project and named the vehicle Chaparral. He had success with the Chaparral 1, winning the Road America 500 and other races. Almost as soon as it was completed, Hall began thinking of a successor vehicle he would build himself.

== Influence ==
Hall pioneered wings, movable aerodynamic devices, side-mounted radiators, semi-automatic transmissions, and composite monocoque chassis structures, which were later adopted by and still present in every Formula 1 car. He was one of the first to recognize and demonstrate the performance benefits of torsional rigidity. The chassis of his Chaparral 2 — it later became known as 2A to distinguish it from subsequent Chaparrals — was by design about four times stiffer than those of the leading sports cars of the day. Hall also introduced the world's first constant downforce racecar, the 1970 Chaparral 2J, which used a snowmobile engine to power two fans to reduce the air pressure between the bottom of the car and the road regardless of vehicle speed. At the 1970 Riverside Can-Am the 2J qualified more than two seconds faster than the championship-winning McLaren M8D. The 2J was also the first car equipped with vacuum-protecting “skirts,” another innovation later adopted by Formula 1. Although it was quickly banned, the 2J “vacuum cleaner” concept was copied eight years later by Brabham Formula 1 designer Gordon Murray who figured out a way to circumvent the rules. The resulting Brabham BT46B won the only race in which it was entered, the 1978 Swedish Grand Prix, proving significantly faster than Colin Chapman's ground effect-tunneled Lotus 79, which secured that year's championship. The development of downforce, from spoilers on his Chaparral 2A to wings movable and otherwise on his Chaparral 2C, 2D, 2E, 2F, 2G, and 2H to the suction system on his 2J, was arguably Hall's single greatest contribution to the sport and the one most copied. In 1979, Hall also became the first to bring ground effect tunnels to IndyCar racing with his groundbreaking Chaparral 2K. Today, because of Hall, downforce is part of the design brief for every major form of racing car — Formula 1, IndyCar, Le Mans, NHRA, NASCAR, World Rally Championship cars, and most high-performance road cars.

"When you put an aerodynamic downforce on a car, it increases the traction and allows it to corner at a much faster speed than it did before,” says Hall. "So that’s really what Chaparral did over a period of years in various ways, and that one idea had a tremendous effect on the future of auto racing.”

== Driver and constructor ==
The first of the true Jim Hall Chaparrals was built in Midland, Texas during 1962 and 1963. At the same time Colin Chapman was building the first monocoque Formula 1 car, Hall was developing a monocoque sports racer of his own design made of composites. He and partner Hap Sharp had scouted the nation's leading aerospace companies for the latest advances in construction techniques. At General Dynamics they met Andy Green, who was designing fiberglass engine fairings for the Convair B-58 Hustler, the world's first supersonic bomber. They hired Green to apply the same advanced fiberglass composite technology to create the first successful full composite racecar monocoque. The advantages of the plastic chassis were twofold: it was much more rigid than traditional chassis, which greatly aided handling, and lighter, aiding performance in all dimensions. When Hall met people from Chevrolet Research & Development, GM's own internal skunkworks, at the 1962 June Sprints at Road America, they picked each other's brains for new ideas. One result was the adoption of a semi-automatic “torque converter” gearbox.

Today, semi-automatic gearboxes are commonplace in racing, but when Hall introduced them — and won with them — onlookers and rivals alike were mystified. Here again Hall's engineering background came into play. “Not only is there literally less work to do,” Hall explained in an article he wrote for Autocar in 1965, “we can keep both hands on the steering wheel, at all times concentrating entirely on exact placing of the car in a turn and just when and how much to brake. Another value is the reliability it induces in other components. It is not possible to over-rev the engine or damage the drive train with shock loads from mismatched shifts and other poor driving techniques.”

The car that came to be known as the Chaparral 2A might have been completed sooner, but another outstanding driving performance, this time at the 1962 season-ending Mexican Grand Prix, led the British Racing Partnership (BRP) Formula 1 team to offer him a seat for the 1963 season. Hall accepted the offer, but neither the team nor Hall realized that BRP, which had scored wins in previous seasons, was on the verge of decline. Nevertheless, Hall managed to accumulate three World Championship points. His best finish was fifth in the 1963 German Grand Prix at the Nürburgring, his first time at the fabled track.

While Hall was in Europe, work continued on the 2A at the small complex in Midland that he co-owned with partner Hap Sharp. Midland was far away from established racing infrastructure but next to the aptly named Rattlesnake Raceway that Hall and Sharp used as a proving ground.

Once it was finished, it proved a revelation. Hall put it on the pole at its first race, the October, 1963 Los Angeles Times Grand Prix, over an international-class field that included soon-to-be F1 champions Jim Clark, Graham Hill, and John Surtees, and future Motorsports Hall of Fame of America legends Dan Gurney, A. J. Foyt, Roger Penske, Lloyd Ruby, Parnelli Jones, Rodger Ward, and Richie Ginther. Hall led easily until sidelined by an electrical fire.

During the 1964 and 1965 seasons, Hall and Sharp (and fill-in Penske, after Hall was injured in an accident at Mosport) dominated American sports car racing in their Chaparral 2As and later 2Cs (there was no Chaparral 2B, to avoid confusion with a General Motors-designed Corvette GS IIB sports racing concept) to a degree no one has before or since. In 1965 alone, in 22 starts in major races against topnotch international competition, Chaparrals collected 16 wins and 16 fastest laps. Hall won the 1964 USRRC title outright and the unlimited class title in 1965.

The team had generated even bigger headlines earlier in the year at the 12 Hours of Sebring. Hall and Sharp put their Chaparral 2A on pole, being 9 seconds faster than reigning World Champion John Surtees had managed the previous year in the top factory Ferrari. Still, few expected the Chaparrals to be able to survive the onslaught of factory-supported Fords and Ferraris, much less the wear and tear of 12 hours of racing on the Sebring runway course. Ford had seven cars, driven by the likes of Dan Gurney, Ken Miles, Bruce McLaren, Richie Ginther, and Phil Hill. The lead Ferrari was driven by endurance racing specialist Pedro Rodriguez and 1962 World Champion Graham Hill. Still, Hall's Chaparral prevailed, overcoming one of the best racers and monsoon-like conditions.

Probably the most influential of Hall's designs was the Chaparral 2E prepared for the following year's inaugural season of Canadian-American Challenge Cup competition. The Chaparral 2E featured side-mounted radiators, a semi-automatic gearbox and other innovations, but what people noticed most was the massive articulated wing mounted on pillars that soared several feet above the rear deck. Said fellow competitor, broadcaster and racing historian Sam Posey, “When those cars arrived on their double-axle trailers in the paddock at Bridgehampton, people just stopped everything and their jaws dropped down on the ground. Nothing in the world existed like that. The two cars went out and the world changed and we were part of it."

Hall had innovated movable aerodynamic devices with a low-mounted wing on the back of the Chaparral 2C. The 2C won major races, but the wing was deployed more as an adjustable spoiler and worked on the rear of the car only, upsetting the car's balance at the same time it was providing crucial downforce. For the 2E, Hall used a symmetrical wing that would create minimal drag in the neutral position, but substantial downforce when tilted downward in the turns. To balance the effect, the 2E also had an adjustable duct in the nose. Both devices were connected to a pedal in the cockpit. Because the semi-automatic Chaparrals only needed a gas pedal and a brake pedal, the driver's left foot was available to activate the “downforce” pedal. “With the wing,” said Chaparral driver Phil Hill, “you could out-brake everybody, you could out-corner everybody, [and] you could drive under them. It really did feel like it had freak roadholding.”

The 2E was demonstrably the fastest car of the inaugural Can-Am season but reliability issues with the new design kept the team from converting its many poles and fastest laps into victories. The 2E missed the first of the season's six races because the wing wasn't yet ready, and won only one of the remaining five, with Hill and Hall finishing 1–2 at the Laguna Seca round where the cars performed flawlessly.

That same year, the small team in Midland converted two of the older chassis for use in endurance racing's World Sportscar Championship. The first iteration — the Chaparral 2D coupe — won the 1966 Nürburgring 1000 kilometers. The second, the more angular Chaparral 2F, which featured a wing and nose duct similar to the 2E, captured the BOAC International 500 at Brands Hatch. There, drivers Phil Hill and Mike Spence led home a Ferrari 330 P4 driven by Grand Prix aces Jackie Stewart and Chris Amon.

Hall told Motor Sport, “I’m really proud that we were able to pull off those wins at the Nürburgring and at Brands Hatch. That was a really fun deal. Somebody told me after we won at the Nürburgring that it was the first American car to win a major European road race in 40 years and I thought, ‘Wow!’”

In May of 1968 when Spence was killed at Indy in a freak practice accident at the wheel of one of Chapman’s revolutionary Lotus 56 turbine cars. The original three drivers nominated for the race were a virtual “super team:” two-time World Champion Jim Clark, soon-to-be two-time World Champion Graham Hill and eventual three-time World Champion Jackie Stewart. After both Clark and his replacement, Spence, were killed and Stewart injured in separate accidents, the team turned to Hall, even though he had never driven an Indy car before which Hall declined.

It was in another development of the 2E, called 2G, that Hall's driving career came to a premature end. At 1968's season-ending Las Vegas Can-Am, Hall was about to unlap himself after an unscheduled pit stop from second-place man Lothar Motschenbacher when the latter's McLaren suffered a catastrophic suspension failure. Hall's Chaparral leap-frogged the stricken McLaren at over 100 MPH and came crashing down in the desert. Hall survived, but his knees in particular were badly damaged. It was six months before he could walk again. He made a brief return to racing during the 1970 Trans-Am season in his team's own works Camaro effort, but while the speed was still there for laps at a time, he could no longer maintain his previous pace over a race distance.

That same year, Hall introduced his final Can-Am challenger, the suction ground effect Chaparral 2J, which was comprehensively faster than every other car in the series. Even though the SCCA had declared it legal before and after the season, other teams lobbied against it and finally persuaded the FIA, the worldwide sanctioning body, to ban it. Disgusted, Hall left the series and quit racing as a whole. Years later, Can-Am's all-time winning driver Denny Hulme, part of the McLaren team that spearheaded the effort to ban the 2J, said, “It was the most stupid thing we ever did, and it was the first major step we took toward killing off the greatest road racing series ever conceived.”

== Team manager ==
After Hall had been away from the sport for several years, Lola importer Carl Haas proposed him to enter Indy car racing. The pair formed Haas-Hall Racing, whetr Haas would provide the sponsors and cars (Lolas), while Hall could concentrate on running the team. As the money to go to Indy did not materialize, they opted to join the SCCA Formula 5000 open-wheel series.

Haas-Hall Racing was virtually unstoppable throughout the decade, winning three consecutive F5000 titles with Brian Redman at the wheel until the series evolved into the second-generation Can-Am, whereupon the team won four more championships. Between the two series, from 1974 through 1980, the partnership collected seven consecutive series titles.

Near the end of the run, the sponsorship to go to Indy did materialize, and Hall began to focus on that series The results again were immediate. In 1978, the team's initial season of Indy car competition, it became the first and still only team to capture Indy car racing's Triple Crown, with victories at the Indianapolis 500, Pocono 500, and California 500.

The successes in the long-distance races hid the shortcomings of the Lola chassis, so Hall decided to take one last stab at car building. He commissioned up-and-coming designer John Barnard to realize his vision of a new kind of Indy car based on the ground effect principle introduced on Colin Chapman's Lotus 78. The resulting Chaparral 2K, nicknamed the "Yellow Submarine" thanks to sponsor Pennzoil's brand colors, changed the face of Indy car racing. The first Indy "tunnel car" dominated the 1979 Indianapolis 500 in Al Unser's hands until sidelined by a transmission issue. It came back the following year and not only won the 500, but captured the 1980 CART PPG Indy Car World Series championship as well with Johnny Rutherford at the helm.

After the 1981 season, Hall remained in Indy car racing off and on with store-bought Lola and Reynard chassis and collected more wins and high finishes with a variety of drivers, including John Andretti and Gil de Ferran. Hall retired from the sport after the 1996 campaign.

== In popular culture ==
During the 1960s, Hall's popularity transcended the automotive enthusiast press, where he and his cars were regular subjects. Both Sports Illustrated and Newsweek did cover stories. Shell featured him in their advertising. Coca-Cola put him in a TV commercial.

Hall was a much larger presence in homes across the United States thanks to a deal with Cox Models, a Santa Ana, California based slot car manufacturer. Cox licensed the rights to reproduce Chaparral cars at the height of the slot car craze. According to slot car expert Philippe de Lespinay, the “Jim Hall Authorized” Cox Chaparrals were the most popular 1/24-scale slot cars of all time. American children were so amazed with Hall and his cars that when they created the Chaparral 2A slot car, Cox had the sculptor model the driver's face to look like Hall.

== Legacy ==
An entire wing of the Permian Basin Petroleum Museum in Midland is devoted to Hall and the Chaparral story, and includes seven of the restored race cars: a 2A, 2D, 2E, 2F, 2H, 2J, and 2K. Each of the cars is driven periodically to maintain them in working condition and to provide the public a chance to see them in action.

Hall and his cars have been featured at most of the major concours and vintage racing events. He was named grand marshal of the 2001 Brian Redman International Challenge at Road America, and Hall and his Chaparrals were featured at the 2003 Amelia Island Concours d'Elegance and 2005 Monterey Historic Automobile Races. Internationally, Hall and his Chaparrals are regular invitees at the Goodwood Festival of Speed.

At the season-ending Laguna Seca round of the 2009 American Le Mans Series, former driver Gil de Ferran painted his Acura ARX-02a to resemble a Chaparral in tribute to Hall, complete with Hall's race number, 66. In storybook fashion, de Ferran put the car on pole and won the race with co-driver and 2019 Indianapolis 500 winner Simon Pagenaud.

At the 2014 Los Angeles Auto Show General Motors debuted the Chaparral 2X, a futuristic homage to the Chaparral ethos, “developed exclusively for fans of the PlayStation® 3 racing game, Gran Turismo® 6.” The concept was emblazoned with Hall's racing number and according to the game maker, captured “the spirit of Jim Hall’s amazing legacy of motorsports innovation.”

== Awards ==
- Hall was inducted in the Motorsports Hall of Fame of America in 1994.
- Hall was inducted into the International Motorsports Hall of Fame in 1997.
- Hall was inducted into the Texas Sports Hall of Fame in 2000.
- Hall received the Caltech Distinguished Alumni Award in 2001.
- Hall was inducted into the inaugural class of the Sebring Hall of Fame in 2002.
- Hall was inducted into the Texas Motorsports Hall of Fame in 2005.
- Hall was inducted into the Indianapolis Motor Speedway Hall of Fame in 2008.
- Hall was inducted into the Sports Car Club of America Hall of Fame in 2012.
- Hall was honored by the Road Racing Drivers Club at the 2012 Long Beach Grand Prix with “An Evening with Jim Hall Presented by Firestone.”

== Complete Formula One results ==
=== Formula One World Championship results ===
(key)

Year	Entrant	Chassis	Engine	1	2	3	4	5	6	7	8	9	10	WDC	Pts.
1960	Jim Hall	Lotus 18	Climax straight-4	ARG	MON	500	NED	BEL	FRA	GBR	POR	ITA	USA; 7	NC	0
1961	Jim Hall	Lotus 18	Climax straight-4	MON	NED	BEL	FRA	GBR	GER	ITA	USA; Ret			NC	0
1962	Jim Hall	Lotus 21	Climax straight-4	NED	MON	BEL	FRA	GBR	GER	ITA	USA; DNS	RSA		NC	0
1963	British Racing Partnership	Lotus 24	BRM V8	MON; Ret	BEL; Ret	NED; 8	FRA; 11	GBR; 6	GER; 5	ITA; 8	USA; 10	MEX; 8	RSA	12th	3

=== Non-Championship Formula One races results ===
(key)

Year	Entrant	Chassis	Engine	1	2	3	4	5	6	7	8	9	10	11	12	13	14	15	16	17	18	19	20
1962	Jim Hall	Lotus 21	Climax straight-4	CAP	BRX	LOM	LAV	GLV	PAU	AIN	INT	NAP	MAL	CLP	RMS	SOL	KAN	MED	DAN	OUL	MEX; 4	RAN	NAT
1963	British Racing Partnership	Lotus 24	BRM V8	LOM; 6	GLV; 4	PAU	IMO	SYR	AIN; Ret	INT; Ret	ROM	SOL; 6	KAN	MED	AUT; Ret	OUL	RAN						

== Complete Canadian-American Challenge Cup results ==
(key) (Races in bold indicate pole position) (Races in italics indicate fastest lap)

Year	Team	Car	Engine	1	2	3	4	5	6	7	8	9	10	Pos.	Pts.
1966	(United States) Chaparral Cars	Chaparral 2E	Chevrolet	MTR; DNA	BRI; DNS	MOS; Ret	**LAG**; 2	RIV; 2	**LVG**; Ret					5th	12
1967	(United States) Chaparral Cars	Chaparral 2G	Chevrolet	ROA; 4	BRI; Ret	MOS; DNA	LAG; 2	RIV; 2	LVG; Ret					5th	15
1968	(United States) Chaparral Cars Inc.	Chaparral 2G	Chevrolet	ROA; 5	BRI; 2	EDM; 11*	LAG; DNS	RIV; 3	LVG; Ret					4th	12
1970	(United States) Chaparral Cars Inc.	Chaparral 2J	Chevrolet	MOS; DNA	MTR	WGL	EDM; DNA	MOH	ROA	ATL	BRA	LAG	RIV	NC	0

* Joint fastest lap.

== 24 Hours of Le Mans results ==
Year	Team	Co-Driver	Car	Class	Laps	Pos.	Class Pos.
1963	(United States) North American Racing Team	(United States) Dan Gurney	Ferrari 330 LMB	P +3.0	126	DNF	DNF

== Jim Hall Racing - IndyCar wins ==
#	Season	Date	Sanction	Track / Race	No.	Winning driver	Chassis	Engine	Tire	Grid	Laps Led
1	1978	May 28	USAC	Indianapolis 500 **(O)**	2	(United States) Al Unser	Lola T500	Cosworth DFX V8t	Goodyear	5	121
2	1978	June 25	USAC	Pocono 500 **(O)**	2	(United States) Al Unser (2)	Lola T500	Cosworth DFX V8t	Goodyear	10	65
3	1978	September 3	USAC	Ontario 500 **(O)**	2	(United States) Al Unser (3)	Lola T500	Cosworth DFX V8t	Goodyear	7	74
4	1979	October 20	CART	Phoenix International Raceway **(O)**	2	(United States) Al Unser (4)	Chaparral 2K	Cosworth DFX V8t	Goodyear	2	138
5	1980	April 13	CART	Ontario **(O)**	4	(United States) Johnny Rutherford	Chaparral 2K	Cosworth DFX V8t	Goodyear	**Pole**	74
6	1980	May 25	USAC	Indianapolis 500 **(O)**	4	(United States) Johnny Rutherford (2)	Chaparral 2K	Cosworth DFX V8t	Goodyear	**Pole**	118
7	1980	July 13	CART	Mid-Ohio Sports Car Course **(R)**	4	(United States) Johnny Rutherford (3)	Chaparral 2K	Cosworth DFX V8t	Goodyear	4	19
8	1980	July 20	CART	Michigan **(O)**	4	(United States) Johnny Rutherford (4)	Chaparral 2K	Cosworth DFX V8t	Goodyear	2	62
9	1980	August 10	CART	Milwaukee Mile **(O)**	4	(United States) Johnny Rutherford (5)	Chaparral 2K	Cosworth DFX V8t	Goodyear	**Pole**	63
10	1981	March 22	CART	Phoenix International Raceway **(O)**	1	(United States) Johnny Rutherford (6)	Chaparral 2K	Cosworth DFX V8t	Goodyear	3	68
11	1991	March 17	CART	Gold Coast Indy 300 **(S)**	4	(United States) John Andretti	Lola T91/00	Chevrolet 265A V8t	Goodyear	9	4
12	1995	September 10	CART	Laguna Seca Raceway **(R)**	8	(Brazil) Gil de Ferran **(R)**	Reynard 95i	Mercedes-Benz IC108B V8t	Goodyear	3	54
13	1996	June 30	CART	Grand Prix of Cleveland **(S)**	8	(Brazil) Gil de Ferran (2)	Reynard 96i	Honda HRH V8t	Goodyear	7	34

== Bibliography ==
- Levy, George (2024-07-09). Texas Legend: Jim Hall and His Chaparrals. Evro Publishing. p. 484. ISBN 978-1910505663.
