= Naval Air Station Pensacola Corry Station =

US Navy station in Florida

Coordinates: 30°24′18″N 87°17′27″W

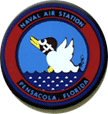
Naval Air Station Pensacola Corry Station
- Part of Naval Air Station Pensacola and Navy Region Southeast
- Escambia County, Florida, U.S.
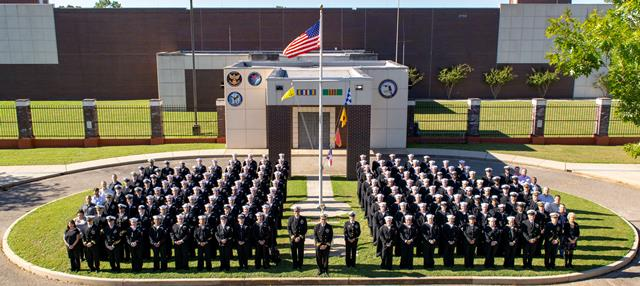
- Command Photo

Site information
- Type: Training Base
- Owner: United States of America
- Controlled by: United States Navy

Site history
- In use: 1928–present

Garrison information
- Current commander: Captain Chandra Newman
- Occupants: Center for Information Warfare Training; Information Warfare Training Command Corry Station; NIOC Pensacola; 344th Military Intelligence Battalion; 350th Civil Affairs Command

Naval Air Station Pensacola Corry Station (NASP Corry Station), Information Warfare Training Command (IWTC), formerly known as Naval Technical Training Center Corry Station in Florida, United States, is a sub-installation of nearby Naval Air Station Pensacola that hosts several of the Navy's Information Warfare Corps training commands. IWTC is the headquarters for its Center for Information Warfare Training and is part of the U.S. Navy's Tenth Fleet.

== History ==
The original Corry Field, initially Kiwanis Field, had its beginning in 1923 in a remote area north of Pensacola, Florida, with relocation to its present site in 1928. The station honors Medal of Honor recipient LCDR William M. Corry, Jr., USN.

In its beginning, Corry Field was an active aviation training complex where advanced fighter plane techniques were taught. In 1943, the field was re-designated as Naval Auxiliary Air Station Corry Field, continuing to serve as a training center for student naval aviators through World War II and during the Korean War and Cold War, until its decommissioning as an active airfield in June 1958.

=== NTTC Corry Station ===
The site saw its metamorphosis from flight training to technical training in 1960, when the first class of Navy enlisted communications technicians (their rating insignia indicated by a feather pen crossed by a spark; later known as cryptologic technicians) arrived. During this time, the installation was known as Naval Communications Training Center Corry Field. Hangars were converted into classrooms and laboratories that were stocked with communications training equipment. To reflect this change, the Chief of Naval Operations changed the name of Corry Field to Naval Technical Training Center Corry Station.

In 1973, NTTC Cory Station was accredited by the Southern Association of Colleges and Schools which certified that students could receive college-level credit for completed courses.

=== Center for Cryptology Corry Station (2003–2005) ===
On April 28, 2003 Naval Technical Training Center Corry Station became the Center for Cryptology Corry Station.

=== CID Corry Station (2005–2016) ===
In 2005, Center for Cryptology Corry Station and the Center for Information Technology San Diego merged to become the Center for Information Dominance Corry Station.

=== Information Warfare Training Command Corry Station 2016–present) ===
In 2016, the Center for Information Dominance Corry Station name was changed to Information Warfare Training Command (IWTC) by Vice Admiral Ted N. "Twig" Branch, who was, at the time, Deputy Chief of Naval Operations for Information Warfare and Office of Naval Intelligence.
