= Shelby American =

American automobile manufacturer

Shelby American, Inc.

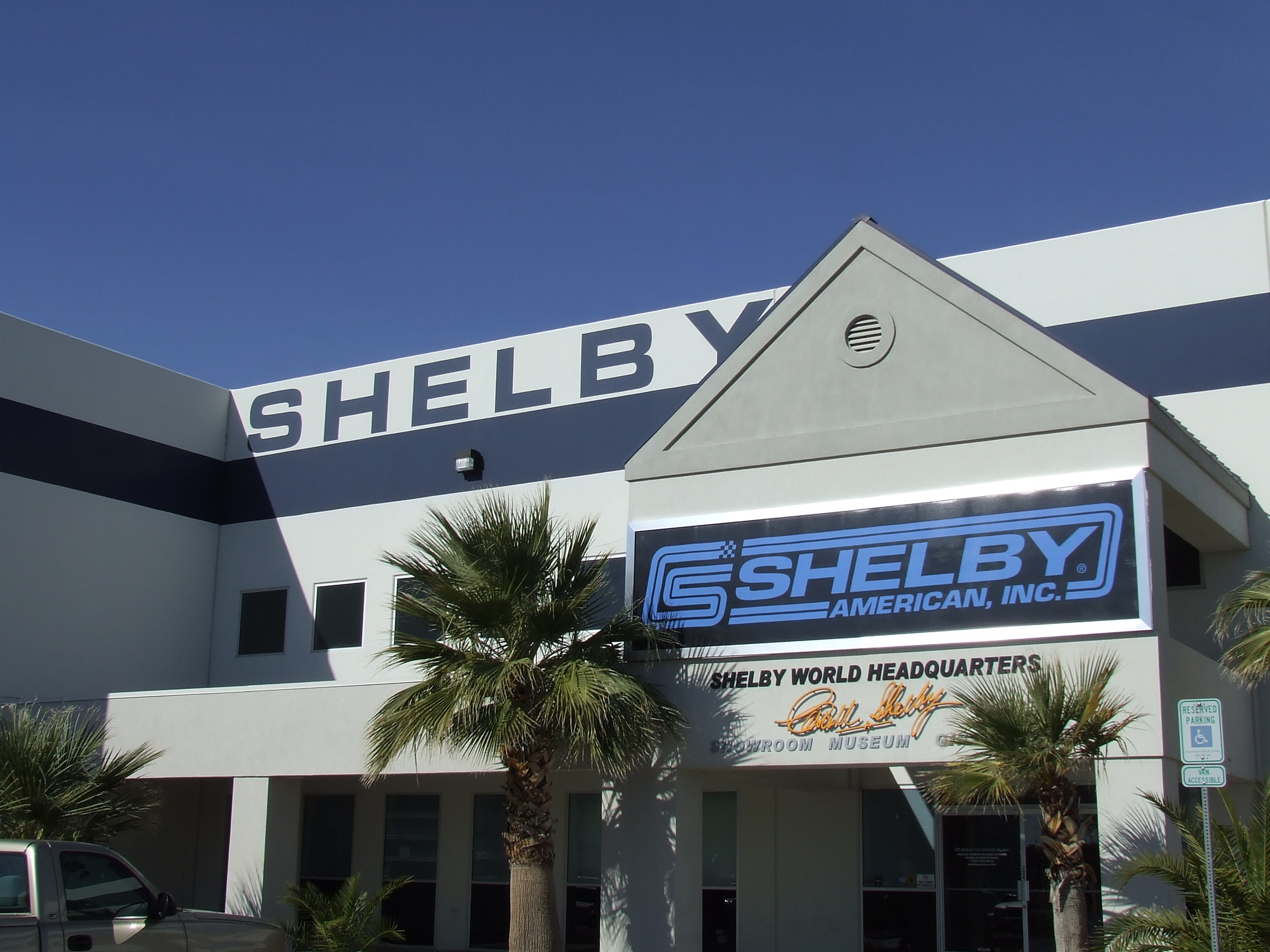
- Shelby American headquarters in Enterprise, Nevada
- Formerly: Shelby Automobiles, Inc.
- Type: Private
- Industry: Automotive
- Founded: August 17, 1962; 64 years ago (original company); April 4, 2003; 23 years ago (present company)
- Founder: Carroll Shelby
- Headquarters: Enterprise, Nevada, United States
- Area served: Worldwide
- Products: Automobiles; Automobile parts
- Parent: Carroll Shelby International, Inc.
- Website: shelby.com

Shelby American, Inc. is an American high performance automobile company founded by driver Carroll Shelby. The Shelby American name has been used by several legally distinct corporations founded by Shelby since his original shop in Venice, California began operation in 1962. The current iteration is a wholly owned subsidiary of Carroll Shelby International, Inc. (Expert Market: CSBI), a holding company formed in 2003. Carroll Shelby International's other wholly owned subsidiary is Carroll Shelby Licensing, which licenses the name and trademarks associated with Shelby to other companies (including Shelby American). Shelby American was the first automobile manufacturer in the state of Nevada. Shelby American manufactures component automobiles, including replicas of the small-block and large-block AC Cobras, the Shelby GT350 and the GT500 Super Snake. Since 2005, Shelby American has released new models each year.

== History ==
=== Founding ===
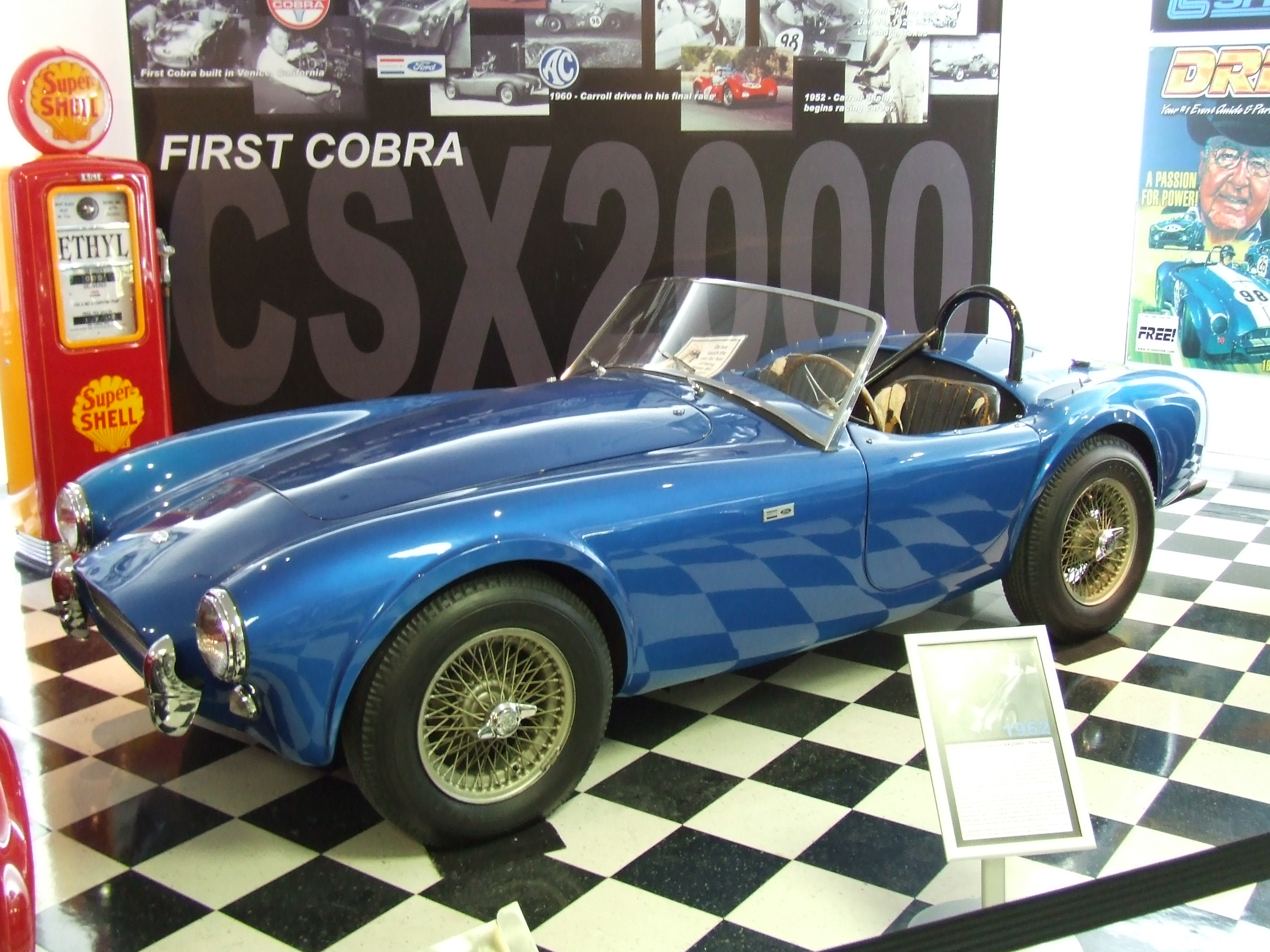
The first AC Cobra, CSX2000, at the Shelby Museum

In 1957, racing driver Carroll Shelby opened a sports car dealership in Dallas, with Dick Hall, selling Maseratis across the American Southwest. They raced Maseratis in the 1957 SCCA National Sports Car Championship, while across the Atlantic Brian Lister's Lister Motor Company enjoyed racing success after installing a Jaguar XK engine in his sports cars. Shelby and Hall met Lister in England with the idea of swapping a Chevrolet small-block engine into the Lister body. They returned to Dallas with six cars, five of which they sold, and the sixth they transplanted the Chevrolet engine into, which Hall raced in the SCCA National Championship. This was Shelby's first experience putting an American V8 engine into a British sports car body.

With funding from oil driller and amateur racer Gary Laughlin, in 1959 Hall and Shelby approached General Motors with the idea of creating a new sports car using the Chevrolet Corvette chassis and engine, but with an aluminum body much lighter than the factory-built Corvette, in order to make a competitive sports car for SCCA racing. Three cars were delivered and had new bodies designed by Carrozzeria Scaglietti installed, but after the initial three cars, GM executives refused to sell them more rolling chassis, worried that the "Scaglietti Corvettes" would compete with GM's own car for sales.

Shelby continued sports cars racing in the late 1950s, competed in Formula 1 for Aston Martin in 1958 and 1959, won the 1959 24 Hours of Le Mans and the 1960 USAC Road Racing Championship, but was forced into retirement following the 1960 season due to his persistent angina caused by a congenital heart defect.

In 1961, Shelby founded the Shelby School of High Performance Driving at Riverside International Raceway near Los Angeles, hiring Pete Brock as a teacher, and obtained a distributorship for Goodyear tires and Champion spark plugs. He rented space for these other businesses from Dean Moon, at his shop Santa Fe Springs, California.

Shelby contacted several European automakers to strike a deal to import their chassis and install an American V8, but he was rebuffed until September 1961, when AC Cars of Britain replied in the affirmative. After the Bristol Aeroplane Company merged with English Electric and Vickers to form the British Aircraft Corporation, the newly spun-off Bristol Cars ceased production of their six-cylinder engine, which AC had been using in their Ace sports car. In need of a new supply of engines, they struck a deal with Shelby: they would ship bodies from their shop in Thames Ditton, Surrey, to Shelby in California for the installation of an American V8 engine, provided a suitable one could be found. Shelby returned to GM, asking for a supply of Chevrolet V8s, but was refused again for fear a Chevrolet-powered European sports car would compete with the Corvette. Instead, he sought an agreement with Ford, who were releasing a new "small-block" V8 engine of their own at the end of the year.

In November 1961, Ford delivered a pair of "Windsor" V8 engines to Moon's shop, and AC's first body arrived in February 1962. Shelby and Moon installed the V8 engine and a Borg-Warner T-10 transmission into the AC body, creating the first of the cars Shelby named "Cobra".

To expand production, Shelby needed a facility of his own. Coincidentally, Lance Reventlow's lease at his shop in Venice, Los Angeles, where his company built Scarab racing cars, was expiring. Shelby leased the building at 1042 Princeton Drive in April and founded his new company, Shelby American, Inc. Phil Remington, Scarab's chief engineer, was hired immediately by Shelby to continue working on the Cobra.

=== Motorsports — Cobra, Daytona and Ford GT40 ===
Shelby American began racing the Cobra in the fall of 1962 with driver Bill Krause entered into the three-hour endurance race at the Los Angeles Times Grand Prix on October 13. Krause ultimately did not finish, having broken an axle shaft, but the car was very competitive with the then-new Corvette Sting Ray Z06, which was also making its racing debut.

Cobras dominated the SCCA United States Road Racing Championship in 1963, but the car was less successful in the FIA World Sportscar Championship. The Cobra's open-top body simply wasn't aerodynamic enough to allow the car to reach the higher top speeds its hardtop coupe competitors were capable of, particularly the Ferrari 250 GTO. For the 1964 season Shelby had Pete Brock design a new aerodynamic body for the Cobra chassis, which would make the car capable of speeds over 190 mph. The new car became known as the "Daytona", named for its inaugural race at the Daytona International Speedway. Only one Daytona coupe was completed at Shelby American; the other five cars prepared for the 1964 World Sportscar Championship had their bodywork completed at Carrozzeria Gransport in Modena, Italy.

Driven by Dan Gurney and Bob Bondurant, the Shelby American Daytona finished first in the GT classes and fourth overall at the 1964 24 Hours of Le Mans, bested only by the prototype Ferrari 275 P and 330 P. The Ford Motor Company's new prototype, the GT40, fared poorly; none of the three cars entered into the race finished. After the end of the Bahamas Speed Week in December—marking the end of the 1964 season—Ford handed control of the GT40 program to Shelby American from Carroll Shelby's old associate John Wyer (who ran the Aston Martin racing program when Shelby won Le Mans in 1959).

Under Shelby's management the GT40 driven by Lloyd Ruby and Ken Miles won the first race of the 1965 season at Daytona, and Miles and Bruce McLaren finished first in the prototype class and second overall at the next race at Sebring, but otherwise the GT40 program was a disappointment overall, once again failing to finish at Le Mans. By contrast the Shelby Daytona coupe had great success for Shelby, winning the GT Division III class on the strength of class wins at Daytona, Sebring, Monza and the Nürburgring. Shelby won a title in the International Championship for GT Manufacturers in the 1965 season with the Shelby Daytona car, thus becoming the first American constructor to win a title on the international scene at the FIA World Championships.

Shelby American worked with Ford to re-engineer the GT40 for the '66 season, replacing the 289 cubic inch (4.7 L) engine with Ford's larger, more powerful 427 cu. in. (7.0 L) engine. The Mk II GT40 achieved very great success, with Shelby American's wins at Daytona, Sebring and Le Mans earning Ford the International Manufacturer's Championship in 1966 and also helping Ford to enter in 24hrs of Le Mans. Shelby American cars finished first (Miles & Ruby again) and second (Gurney & Jerry Grant) at Daytona, first at Sebring (Miles & Ruby), and first (McLaren & Chris Amon) and second (Miles & Denny Hulme) at Le Mans; recalled in the 2019 film called Ford v Ferrari. Gurney and Grant would have finished second at Sebring except their car broke down on the last lap and Gurney pushed it across the finish line, automatically disqualifying them.

During the 1966 season Shelby and Ford were already developing a more advanced version of the GT40, known early in its development as the "J-car". On August 17, 1966, only a couple months after the race at Le Mans, Ken Miles died at the wheel of a J-car while conducting high-speed testing of the car for preparing more races at Riverside. The J-car was re-engineered with improved safety features and better aerodynamics, becoming the GT40 Mk IV. In 1967 the Mk IV won the only two races they entered, at Sebring and Le Mans. McLaren and Mario Andretti won the race at Sebring, while Gurney and A. J. Foyt won Le Mans, with McLaren and Mark Donohue in fourth.

After the 1967 season the FIA changed the rules governing prototypes, and the 7.0 L engine used in the Mk II and Mk IV GT40s became ineligible. Ford wound up the Ford Advanced Vehicles group and Shelby American withdrew from the World Sportscar Championship, transferring control back to John Wyer's J.W. Automotive Engineering (JWA). JWA GT40s won the 1968 and 1969 races at Le Mans, giving the GT40 program an unprecedented four consecutive wins (matched only by the Porsche 956 in the 1980s).

=== Ford Mustang ===
While Shelby American was building and racing Cobras and Daytonas, Ford introduced the new Mustang at the New York World's Fair in April, 1964. Ford vice-president Lee Iacocca promised that the car would be "a sports car suitable for street use or competition" in his introductory speech to the press. In reality the car's sporting credentials were somewhat lacking, and Iacocca hired Shelby American to develop a version of the car suitable for racing.

The Shelby Mustang GT350 was created, with upgraded intake and exhaust manifolds, carburetor, rear axle and brakes installed at Shelby American's shop in California in place of the standard Ford parts.

With work on the GT40 program and production of the GT350 beginning to ramp up Shelby American ran out of space at their shop in Venice, moving instead to an aircraft hangar at Los Angeles International Airport in 1965. The facility is still in existence, renovated in 1996, and is now the location of the Qantas Freight Cargo Terminal located at 6555 W Imperial Hwy, Los Angeles CA 90045. The steel tracks used to move the cars during assembly are still partially visible. The GT350 was very successful in the SCCA B-Production class, winning the class three consecutive years.

The offerings from Shelby American were expanded in 1966 to include an optional automatic transmission, and Shelby famously built special edition GT350s for Hertz. Hertz was a Ford subsidiary at the time, and when the cars were returned by Hertz to Ford they were re-sold to the public as the "GT350H".

For 1967 Shelby installed the Ford 428 cu. in (7.0 L) engine in the Mustang, creating the "GT500". Revised front and rear fascias distinguished the 1967 Shelby Mustangs from the common Fords they were based on. Shelby ran a separate racing team, "Terlingua Racing", in the 1967 Trans-American Sedan Championship, with Jerry Titus winning the championship driving a GT350.

The sales of Shelby Mustangs increased six-fold from 1966 to 1967, and for 1968 Ford encouraged Shelby to move production from California to Michigan to simplify the logistics of shipping bare Ford Mustangs from their plant in New Jersey to Shelby. In November, 1967 Shelby American's operations were split into three separate companies. Shelby Automotive, the Mustang production arm, was set up in Livonia, Michigan and actual production moved to the facilities of fibreglass supplier A. O. Smith in nearby Ionia. The Shelby Racing Company moved from the hangar at LAX to a new office in Torrance, California. The Shelby Parts Company (later renamed to Shelby Autosports) moved to Torrance, and later to the Detroit area.

After 1968 Ford took functional control of the Shelby Mustang design and production, moving production in-house for the 1969 model year. After the 1969 racing season Shelby withdrew from competition. Carroll Shelby announced he was retiring from the automotive business in January, 1970, and Shelby American and its subsidiaries were essentially defunct.

=== Dodge ===
Carroll Shelby maintained ownership of his Goodyear tire distributorship and set up the Shelby Wheel Company in 1971 in Gardena, California, producing and selling aftermarket aluminum wheels, but he remained otherwise out of the automotive industry until 1982. His old friend Lee Iacocca had become president and CEO of the Chrysler Corporation, and contacted him with a proposition: Chrysler would set up a new Chrysler-Shelby Performance Center in Santa Fe Springs, California (not far from Dean Moon's shop where the first Cobra was assembled) so that Shelby could assist Chrysler's engineers to create high-performance versions of their cars, similar to his relationship with Ford almost 20 years earlier.

Shelby assisted with the creation of the 1983 Dodge Shelby Charger, a two-door performance variant of the front-wheel drive Dodge Omni. For 1984 Shelby assisted with the Omni GLH, named by Shelby as an initialism for "Goes Like Hell". The front-wheel drive cars were powered by turbocharged four-cylinder engines, with design improvements more focused on handling than all-out power.

With the success of the Shelby Charger and Omni GLH Carroll Shelby set up a new company similar to the original Shelby American. Shelby Automobiles, Inc. was founded in 1983 and began operation in 1985 out of a shop in Whittier, California, near the Chrysler-Shelby Performance Center, producing performance versions of Chrysler cars. The first product was the 1986 GLHS, a higher-performance version of the Omni GLH. With raised boost pressure and an intercooler the GLHS's 2.2 L engine produced 175 hp—29 more than the GLH, and about 85% more than the standard Omni. With new suspension components to improve the car's handling its performance equalled or bettered its V8-powered, rear-wheel drive contemporaries from Ford and General Motors, and even surpassed the 1965 Shelby GT350.

Shelby Automobiles produced special editions of the Charger (1987 GLHS), Dodge Lancer (Shelby Lancer), Dodge Shadow (Shelby CSX) and Dodge Dakota pickup truck (Shelby Dakota), before ceasing operations in 1990. Carroll Shelby consulted on the development of the Dodge Viper, but Shelby Automobiles was defunct, just as Shelby American was 20 years earlier.

=== Series 1 ===
Carroll Shelby founded the Shelby American Management Company in 1982 to manage his many other business ventures. His business associate and president of the company, Don Landy, floated the idea of creating an entirely new Shelby branded sports car in the mid-1990s. Landy approached General Motors' Cadillac division, which had recently begun production of a new double overhead camshaft V8 engine called "Northstar", with the idea of Cadillac being the exclusive supplier of engines for this proposed new sports car. Landy was rebuffed so he approached Oldsmobile, who were building a 4.0 L version of the new V8 engine for their Aurora sedan. Oldsmobile had been in a significant sales decline since the late 1980s and Oldsmobile general manager John Rock believed the Shelby sports car had the potential to reinvigorate Oldsmobile in the same way that Shelby's involvement with Chrysler and the Dodge Viper reinvigorated the Dodge brand.

A new Shelby American, Inc. was founded in 1995 in Las Vegas. Don Landy was replaced by another of Carroll Shelby's business associates, Don Rager, and design of the new car began at Shelby's shop in Gardena, California while a new assembly plant was being built near the Las Vegas Motor Speedway.

The new car, called Series 1, was shown as prototypes at the Los Angeles Auto Show and North American International Auto Show in Detroit in 1997.

Unlike the arrangements Shelby American had with Ford and Shelby Automobiles had with Chrysler, financial support for the Series 1 came not directly from General Motors. Instead a select number of Oldsmobile dealers were sold the exclusive rights to sell the Series 1 cars for a $50,000-per-car deposit. This financial arrangement became untenable by 1998 and a 75% share of Shelby American was sold to Venture Corporation, supplier of the car's exterior body panels and many interior trim pieces. The production of Cobra replicas was not part of the transfer of ownership, with Shelby retaining those rights.

Cars finally began delivery to customers in the summer of 1999, but initial build quality was very poor. Deliveries of finished cars did not resume until August, 2000.

Venture Holdings was forced into bankruptcy by the bankruptcy of one of its other subsidiaries in 2003. Soon thereafter Carroll Shelby formed a new holding company called "Carroll Shelby International, Inc.", and it was taken public. A new Shelby Automobiles was also created as a manufacturing arm of the new company.

In 2004 Shelby Automobiles purchased Shelby American and the assets to the Series 1 model. On December 15, 2009, Carroll Shelby International announced in a press release that Shelby Automobiles was being renamed to "Shelby American" in celebration of the 45th anniversary of the 427 Cobra and GT350.

=== Cobra reproductions ===
Carroll Shelby International was previously working with Texas-based Unique performance to create new Mustang-based Shelby cars such as the GT350SR and "Eleanor". On November 1, 2007, Unique Performance was raided by the Farmers Branch Police Department due to VIN irregularities and subsequently declared bankruptcy, which effectively ended the Shelby continuation "Eleanor" production and the relationship.

== Model line-up ==
- CSX1000-series AC Holdings Ltd. chassis and aluminum bodies (of modern production)
- CSX4000-series various manufacturers, fiberglass and aluminum bodywork available
- CSX5000-series Shelby Series I models built in 2005 as component vehicles.
- CSX6000-series continuation of the CSX4000 series
- CSX7000-series 289 FIA Cobra roadster
- CSX8000-series 289 street car
- CSX9000-series Cobra "Daytona" coupe, released in 2009

== Shelby Museum ==
The Shelby Heritage Center is located at 6405 Ensworth Street in Las Vegas, Nevada. It includes a wide range of Shelby vehicles, from the first Cobra CSX2000 to prototypes of Series 1 and some of the latest creations.

== Cobras ==
	Totals 1962-65
260 Cobra street cars	62
Factory teams cars (initially 260 engines, then updated to 289)	4
Factory-prepared competition cars (initially with 260 engines, then updated to 289)	1
Independently prepared competition race cars	7
Dragonsnake (initially 260 engines, then updated to 289)	1
Total 260 Cobras	75

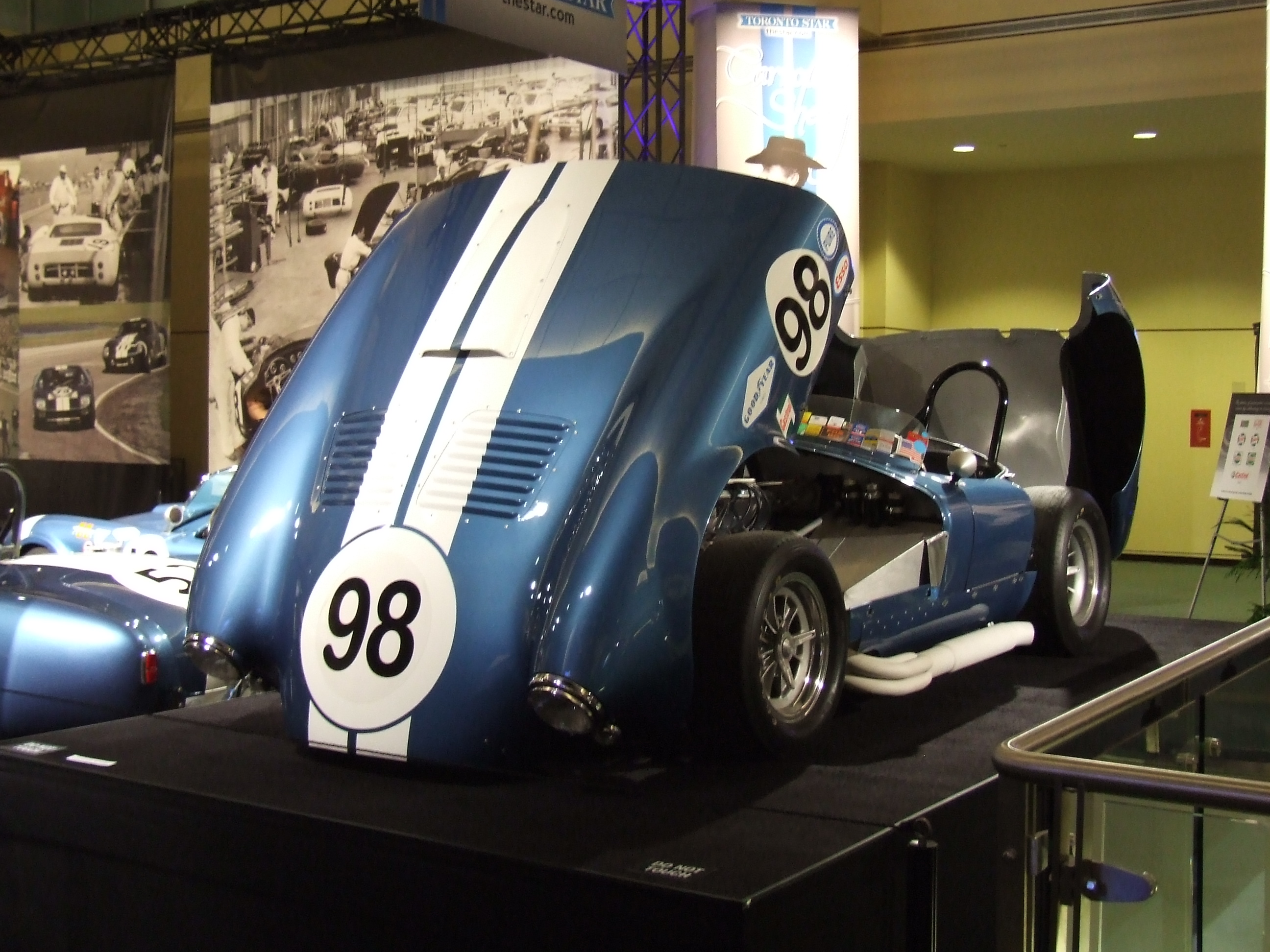
"Flip-Top" prototype

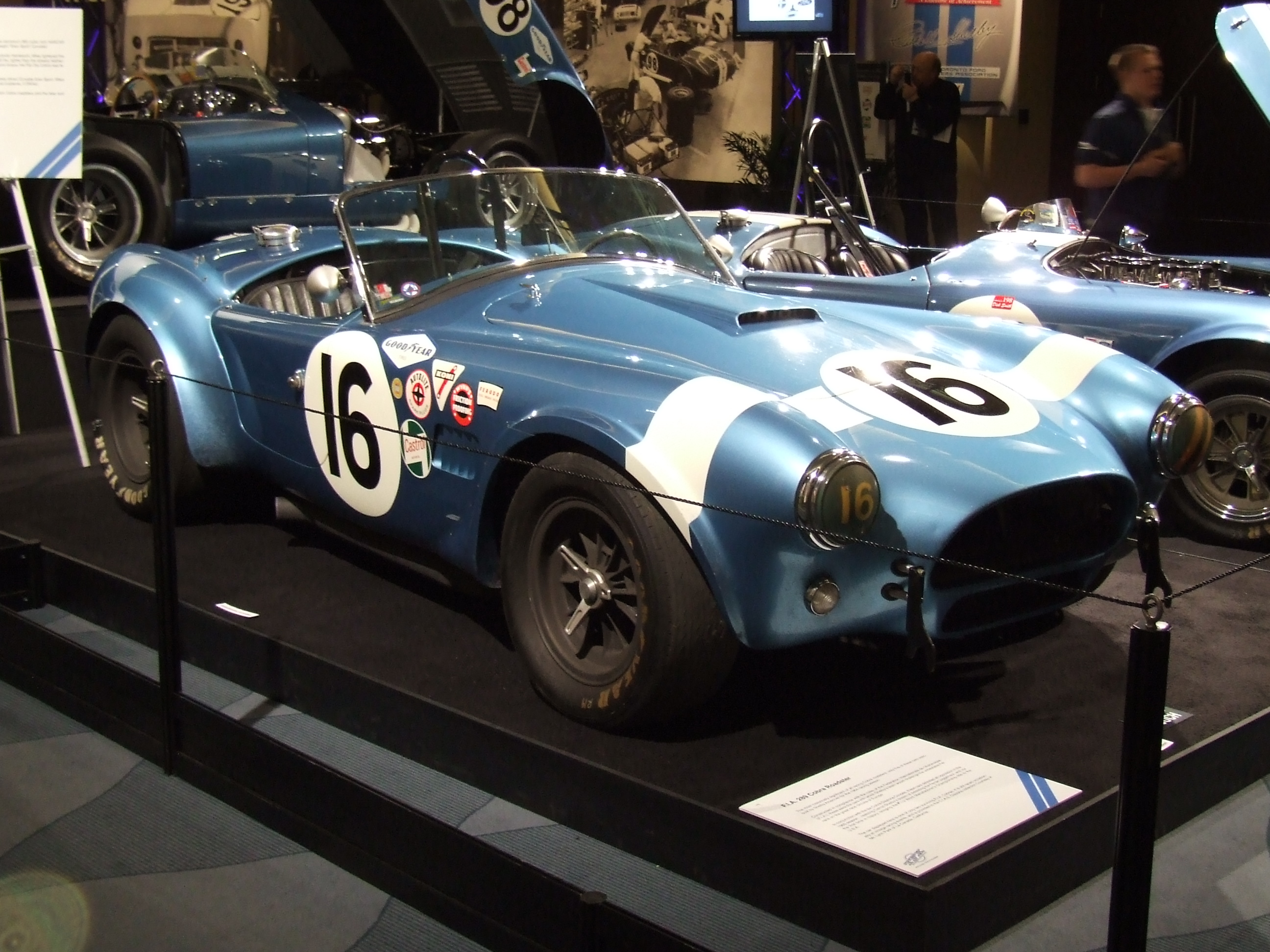
289 FIA roadster

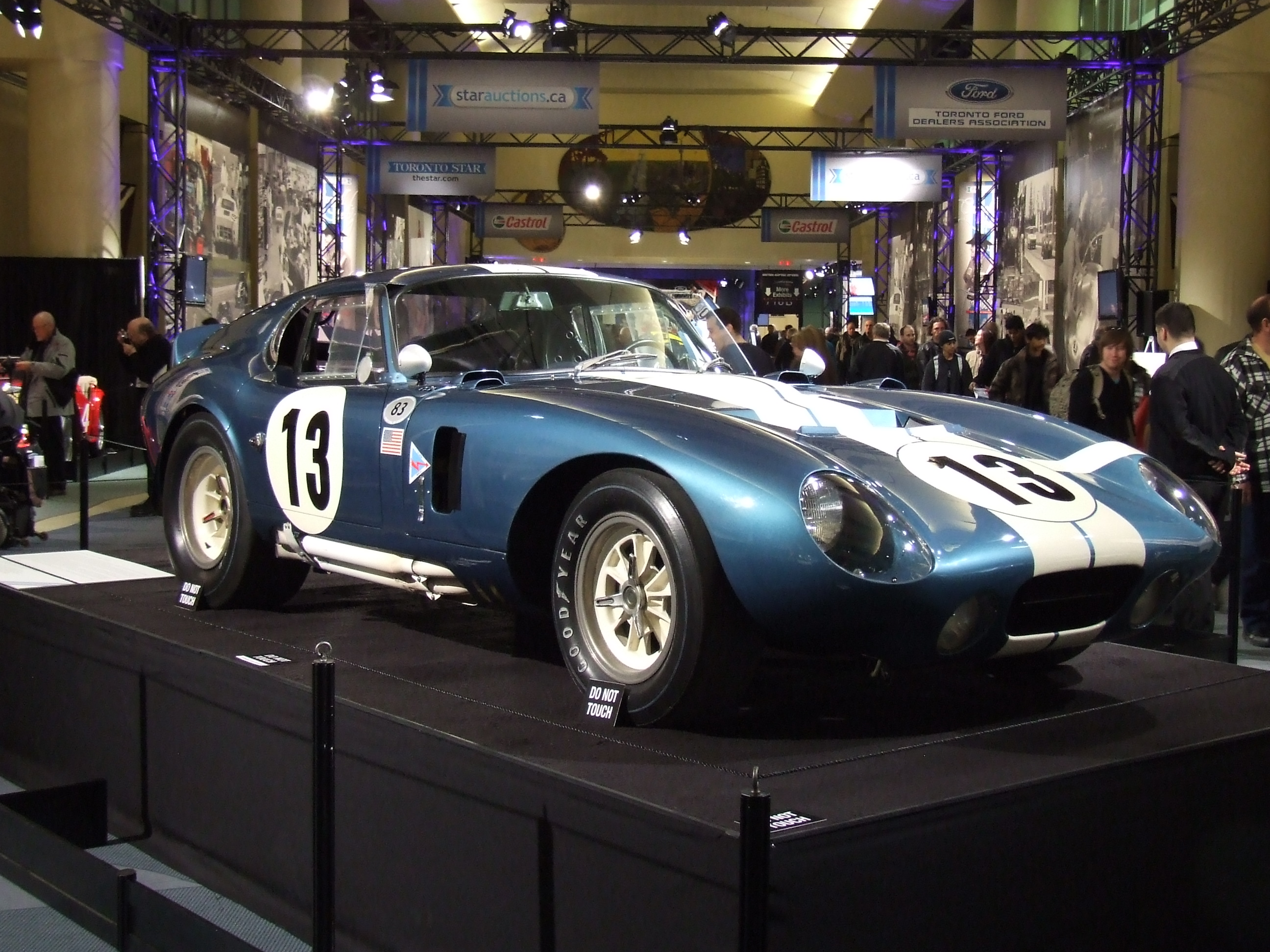
1964 Daytona coupe (CSX2299)

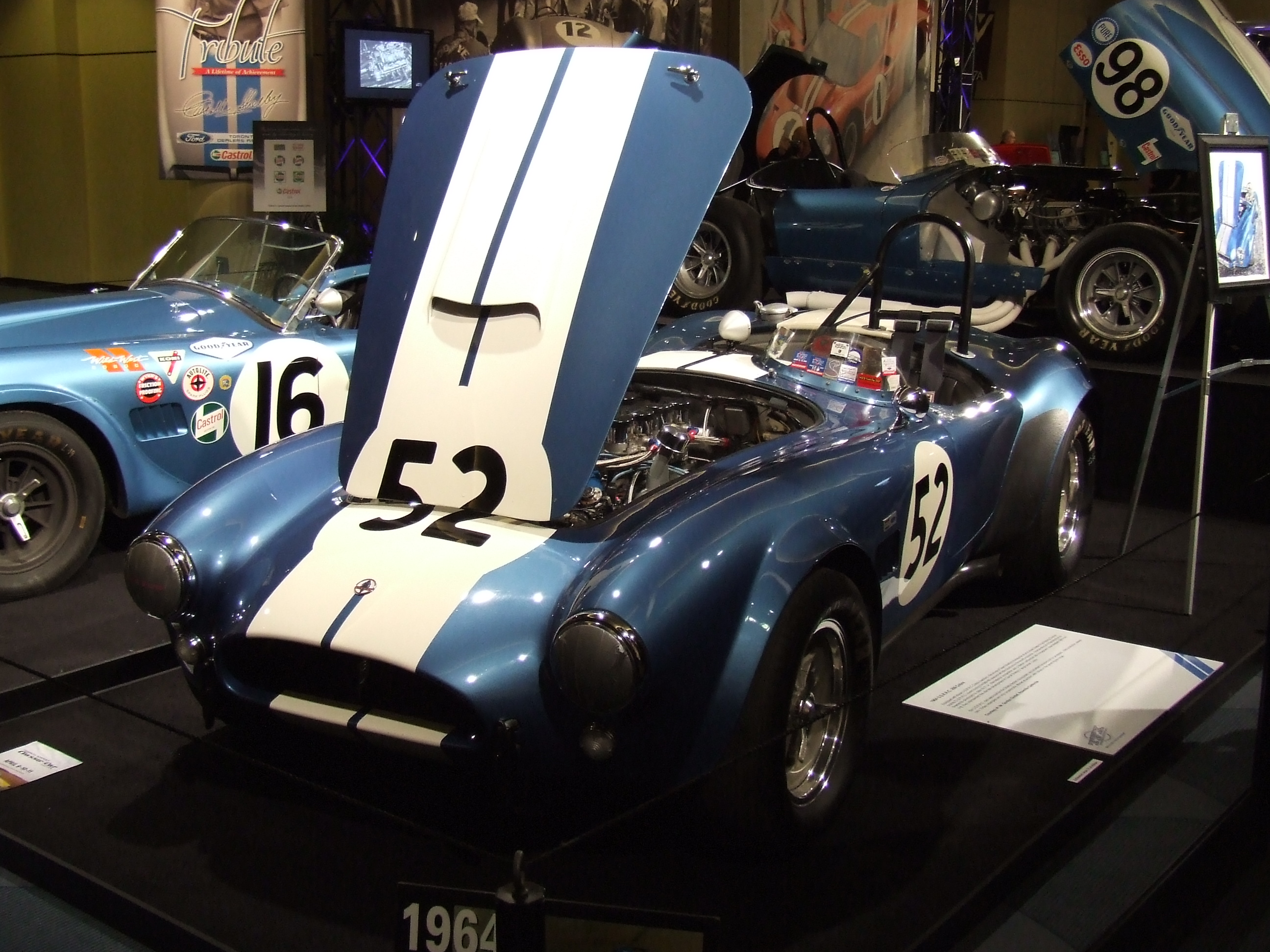
289 USRRC roadster

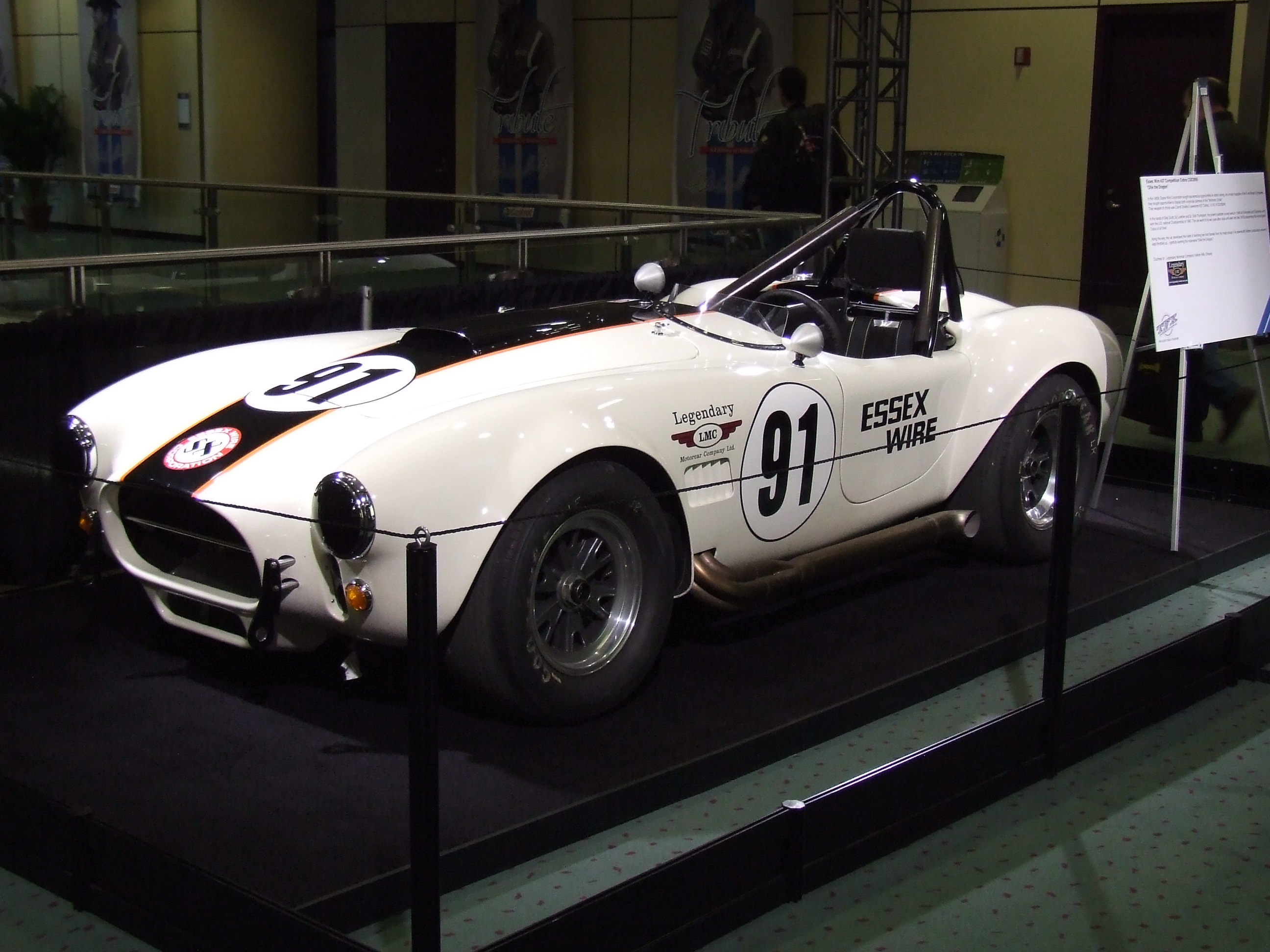
427 Competition Roadster, "Ollie the Dragon" (CSX3009)

289 Cobras	Totals 1962-65
Street Cobras	455
Standard competition	2
Sebring Cobras	3
Le Mans Cobras	10
427 prototypes	1
427 prototypes "Flip-Top"	1
FIA roadsters	5
Daytona coupes	6
USRRC roadsters	6
Total factory team cars	29
Factory-prepared competition Cobras
Standard competition	2
Le Mans prototype	1
Le Mans replica	3
USRRC roadsters	5
Independently prepared race Cobras	21
Dragonsnake Cobras	2
COB/COX* street Cobras	60
COB/COX* race Cobra	1
Total 289 Cobras	580

Total small-block Cobras 655

- (COB - Cobras for Great Britain)
- (COX - Cobras for export)

Coil spring big-block Cobras	Cobra production totals 1962-65
Street cars	260
Prototype competition roadsters	2
Production competition roadsters	19
Semicompetition roadsters	1
Daytona Super coupe	1
Chassis only	3
COB/COX Cobras	32
1965-67 427 and 428 Cobras	348

Total Cobras built 1,003

== Shelby production totals 1965-89 ==
1965

- GT 350 - 515
- GT 350R - 36
- GT 350 drag cars - 9
- GT 350 street prototype - 1
- Competition prototype GT 350 - 1

Total 1965 Shelby Mustangs - 562

1966

- GT 350 - 1,370
- GT 350H - 1,000
- GT 350 convertibles - 6
- GT 350 drag cars - 4

Total 1966 Shelby Mustangs - 2,380

1967

- GT 350 Fastback - 1,175
- GT 500 Fastback - 2,048
- GT 500 Coupe "Little Red" - 1
- GT 500 Convertible - 1
- GT 500 Fastback prototype - 1
- GT 350 Coupe Group II Race Cars - 15

Total 1967 Shelby GT Mustangs - 3,240

1968

- GT 350 Fastback - 1,253
- GT 350 Convertible - 404
- GT 500 Fastback - 1,140
- GT 500 Convertible - 402
- GT 500KR Fastback - 933
- GT 500KR Convertible - 318
- GT 500 Coupe "Green Hornet" - 1 (no Shelby VIN assigned)

Total 1968 Ford Shelby Cobra GT Mustangs - 4,451

1969 & 1970

- GT 350 Fastback - 935
- GT 350 Convertible - 194
- GT 500 Fastback - 1,536
- GT 500 Convertible - 335
- GT 350 Hertz cars - 15
- Prototype test cars - 3
- Cars updated to 1970 specifications - 789 (estimated)

Total 1969-70 Ford Shelby Cobra GT Mustangs - 3,294

Shelby cars totals - 13,912

1986-1989

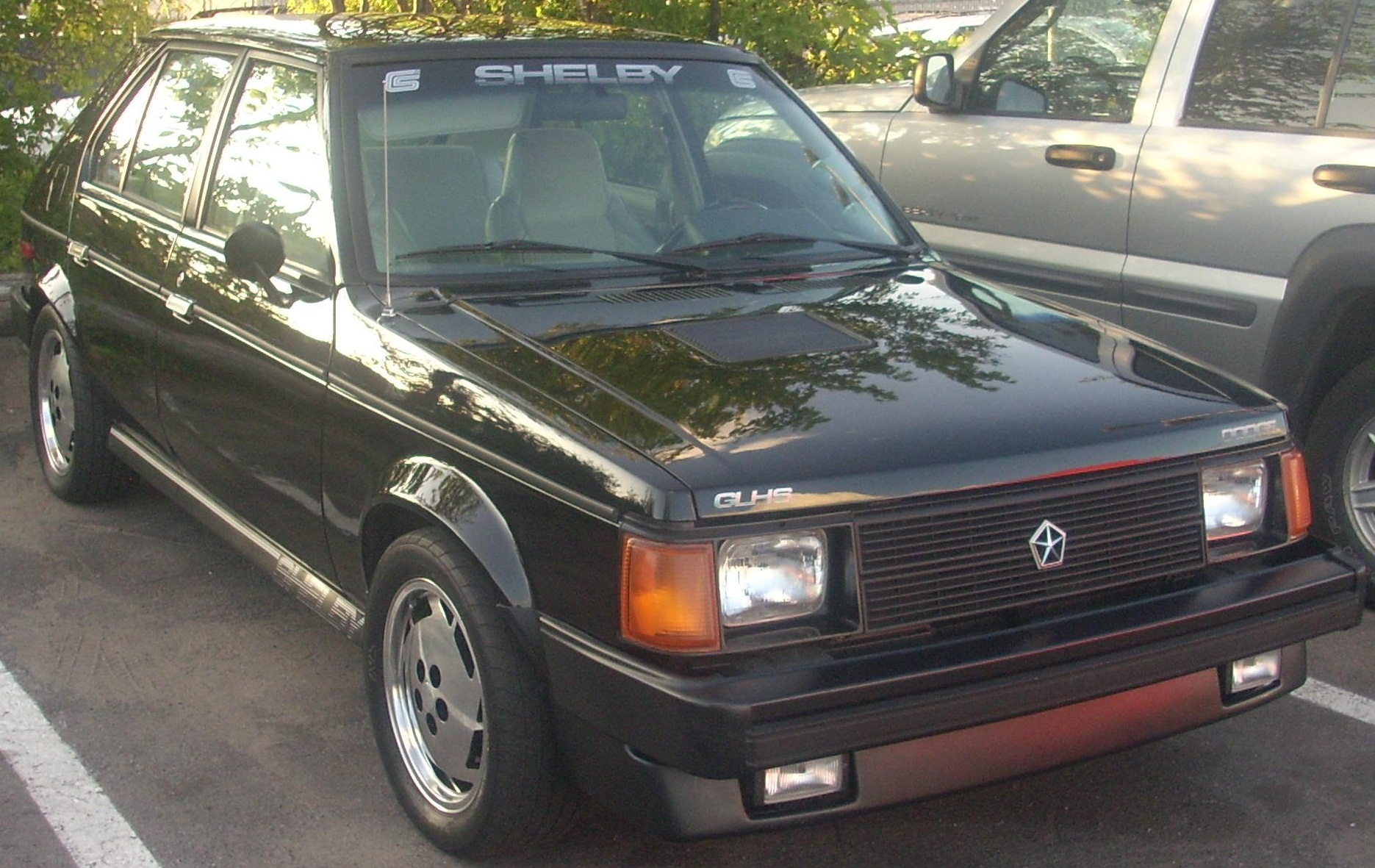
The first Dodge built in Carroll's plant was the 1986 GLHS Omni

- 1986 GLH-S Omni- 500
- 1987 GLH-S Charger- 1000
- 1987 Shelby Lancer- 800
- 1987 Shelby CSX- 750
- 1988 Shelby CSX-T (Thrifty car rental) -1000
- 1989 Shelby Dakota- 1500
- 1989 Shelby CSX-VNT- 500

Total Dodge production- 6,050

Shelby vehicle total- 19,962

== Shelby cars ==
- AC Cobra
- CSX
- Dakota
- Daytona
- GLH-S
- Lancer
- Mustang
- Series 1
- GT40 MKII (Shelby team)

== Global operations ==
With the worldwide release of the sixth generation Ford Mustang, including right-hand-drive markets, Shelby American began to partner with top-tier automobile modification shops internationally. These partnerships enable customers in other countries to purchase Shelby products locally rather than have to import cars from the United States.

=== Australia ===
Mustang Motorsport, located in Victoria is Australia's only authorized Shelby modification shop. The shop has been in business since 1990 importing and converting U.S Fords to right-hand-drive. The shop also stocks and fits high performance Mustang parts. Current Shelby models offered are Shelby Mustang GTs and Super Snakes.

=== Canada ===
Shelby American has three authorized shops in Canada: Shelby Canada West in Fort Saskatchewan, Dale Adams in Calgary, and Xcentrick Autosports in Ontario, which services eastern Canada.

=== Europe ===
Shelby Europe was established in 2016 through a partnership with GU Autotrade B.V. in the Netherlands. Shelby trucks are produced by GU Autotrade's manufacturing partner, Magna Steyr, while Shelby Mustangs are produced by another manufacturing partner, TechArt, in Leonberg, Germany.

=== New Zealand ===
In 2019 Shelby American partnered with Matamata Panelworks in the North Island of New Zealand to form Shelby New Zealand. The New Zealand operation offers Shelby trucks, the Shelby GT, the Super Snake and Wide Body Super Snake, with the cars also sold through select Ford dealers. The shop also offers performance upgrades, conversions, merchandise and accessories for existing Mustang owners.

Links between Shelby and New Zealand date back to the 1960s with renowned fabricator, New Zealander John Ohlsen working with Peter Brock, and Ken Miles on the original Daytona Cobra coupe in 1964. After the Daytona project, Ohlsen became Shelby's chief mechanic for the 1964-1965 race season and stayed with Shelby until 1966. New Zealanders Denny Hulme, Bruce McLaren, and Chris Amon drove for Shelby in the 1966, 34th Grand Prix of Endurance in Le Mans, France. Shelby himself was married (albeit briefly) to a New Zealander, Sue Stafford, in 1963. Shelby employed her father, Arthur Stafford as a race mechanic.

=== South Africa ===
Shelby South Africa was formed in Malmesbury, Western Cape in 2017 and offers high-end performance packages for the GT and Super Snake platforms. The company also retains distribution rights for the Shelby Cobra, Dayton Cobra Coupe, and Ford GT40.
