= Ken Miles =

British racing driver (1918–1966)

- Ken Miles

Personal details
- Born: Kenneth Henry Jarvis Miles; 1 November 1918 Sutton Coldfield, Warwickshire, England
- Died: 17 August 1966 (aged 47) Riverside International Raceway, California, U.S.
- Resting place: Hollywood Forever, Hollywood, California, U.S.
- Citizenship: United Kingdom

Military service
- Allegiance: United Kingdom
- Branch/service: British Army
- Years of service: 1939–1946
- Rank: Staff sergeant
- Battles/wars: World War II

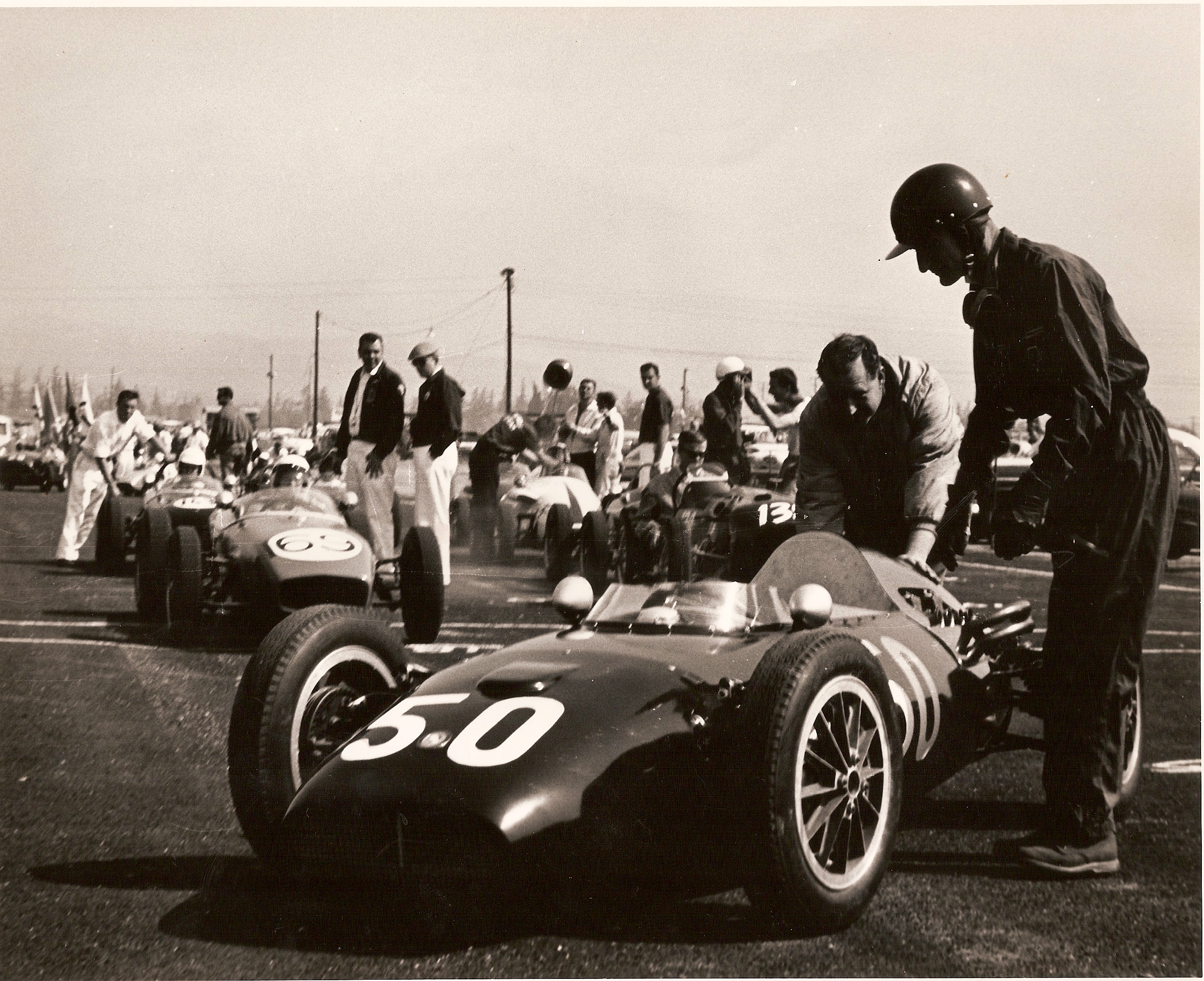
Ken Miles stepping into Dolphin Mk.2, March 1961.

Kenneth Henry Jarvis Miles (1 November 1918 – 17 August 1966) was an English sports car racing engineer and driver best known for his motorsport career in the U.S. and with American teams on the international scene. He is an inductee to the Motorsports Hall of Fame of America. As an automotive engineer, he is known for developing, along with driver and designer Carroll Shelby, the Ford GT40, the car that won the 24 Hours of Le Mans in 1966, 1967, 1968, and 1969. Miles and Shelby's efforts at Le Mans were dramatized in the 2019 Oscar-winning film Ford v Ferrari.

== Early life ==
Miles was born on 1 November 1918 in Sutton Coldfield, then in Warwickshire, now in the city of Birmingham. He was the son of Eric Miles and Clarice Jarvis. After a failed attempt to run away to the United States, Miles left school at the age of 15 to work as an apprentice at Wolseley Motors, who sent him to a technical school to broaden his knowledge of vehicle construction. He raced motorcycles before joining the British Army, during World War II.

Miles' first role in the military was driving instructor in the Territorial Army. On 1 October 1942, as an armament artificer, he was among the founding members of the Royal Electrical and Mechanical Engineers (REME), and transferred to the REME Training Establishment. The following year Miles was posted to Guards Armoured Division Workshops, followed by the 29th Armoured Brigade Workshop. He landed in Normandy on 15 June 1944, and later that year was posted to the Light Aid Detachment of the 15th/19th King’s Royal Hussars. Miles served in North West Europe until the end of the war, by which time he had achieved the rank of staff sergeant. He served as a tank commander, and the experience is said to have fuelled a new love in Miles for high-performance engineering. He was discharged to the reserves on 1 April 1946.

== Racing career ==
After the war, Miles raced Bugattis, Alfa Romeos, and Alvises with the Vintage Sports Car Club. He then turned to a Ford V8 Frazer-Nash.

In 1952, Miles moved from England to the U.S. and settled in Los Angeles, California, as a service manager for Gough Industries, the Southern California MG distributor. In 1953, he won 14 straight victories in SCCA racing in an MG-based special of his own design and construction.

For the 1955 season, Miles designed, constructed, and campaigned a second special based on MG components that was known as the "Flying Shingle". It was very successful in the SCCA F modified class on the West Coast. Miles raced the "Flying Shingle" at Palm Springs in late March, finishing first overall against veteran driver Cy Yedor, also in an MG Special, and novice driver, actor James Dean in a Porsche 356 Speedster. Miles was later disqualified on a technical infraction because his fenders were too wide, thus allowing Yedor and Dean to get 'bumped up' to first and second. During 1956, Miles raced John von Neumann's Porsche 550 Spyder at most of the Cal Club and SCCA events.

For the 1957 season (in co-operation with Otto Zipper), Miles engineered the installation of a Porsche 550S engine and transmission in a 1956 Cooper chassis and body. It was the second successful race car to be known on the West Coast as "the Pooper", the first being an early 1950s Cooper chassis and body powered by a Porsche 356 power train that was built and campaigned by Pete Lovely of Tacoma, Washington. The resulting car dominated the F Modified class of SCCA on the West Coast in the 1957 and 1958 seasons with Miles driving.

Due to his great skill and talent, both as a driver and mechanical engineer, Miles was a significant member of the Shelby/Cobra race team in the early 1960s. Miles described himself this way:

I am a mechanic. That has been the direction of my entire vocational life. Driving is a hobby, a relaxation for me, like golfing is to others. I should like to drive a Formula One machine, not for the grand prize, but just to see what it is like. I should think it would be jolly good fun!

With a very pronounced Brummie accent (from his hometown of Birmingham, renowned for car manufacturing) combined with a seemingly obscure and sardonic sense of humour, Miles was affectionately known by his American racing crew as "Teddy Teabag" (for his tea drinking) or "Sidebite" (as he talked out of the side of his mouth). He played a major role in the development and success of the racing versions of the Shelby Cobra 289 in SCCA, USRRC, and FIA sports car racing between 1962 and 1965, as well as the Daytona Coupe and 427 versions of the Cobra and the Ford GT (GT40).

Miles became the chief test driver of Shelby-American in 1963.

Miles had a "reputation for courtesy on the track" and was sometimes called the "Stirling Moss of the West Coast". While a member of the AC-Cobra Ford Team, Miles entered a Lotus 23 in the 1964 Player's 200 at Mosport.

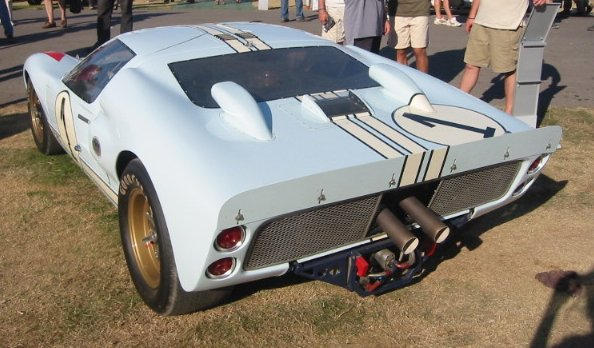
GT40 Mk II rear

In 1965, Miles shared a Ford GT Mk II with Bruce McLaren at the 24 Hours of Le Mans, but retired with gearbox trouble. Earlier in the year, also with McLaren, he had finished second at the 12 Hours of Sebring, and won the Daytona 2000 km that same year, with Lloyd Ruby.

The next year, Miles won the 24 Hours of Daytona, sharing the Ford GT Mk II with Lloyd Ruby, and then won the 12 Hours of Sebring. Several months later, sharing the drive with Denny Hulme, Miles was leading the 1966 24 Hours of Le Mans in the #1 car, but Ford executives, desiring a publicity photo of three of Ford's cars crossing the finish line together, instructed Miles to slow down, which he did. Accordingly, on the final lap the next car from Ford driven by Bruce McLaren/Chris Amon and the third-place car from Ford drew up, and they cruised to the line together. Miles's #1 car and McLaren's #2 car crossed the finish line almost at the same time, with photos and official track data showing McLaren's #2 as 6 metres ahead when crossing the line. Additionally, McLaren's #2 started just over 14 metres behind Miles's car and had therefore covered more distance during the race; the official rules regarding cars finishing together indicate that starting position should be taken into account, so McLaren was declared the winner.

== Death ==
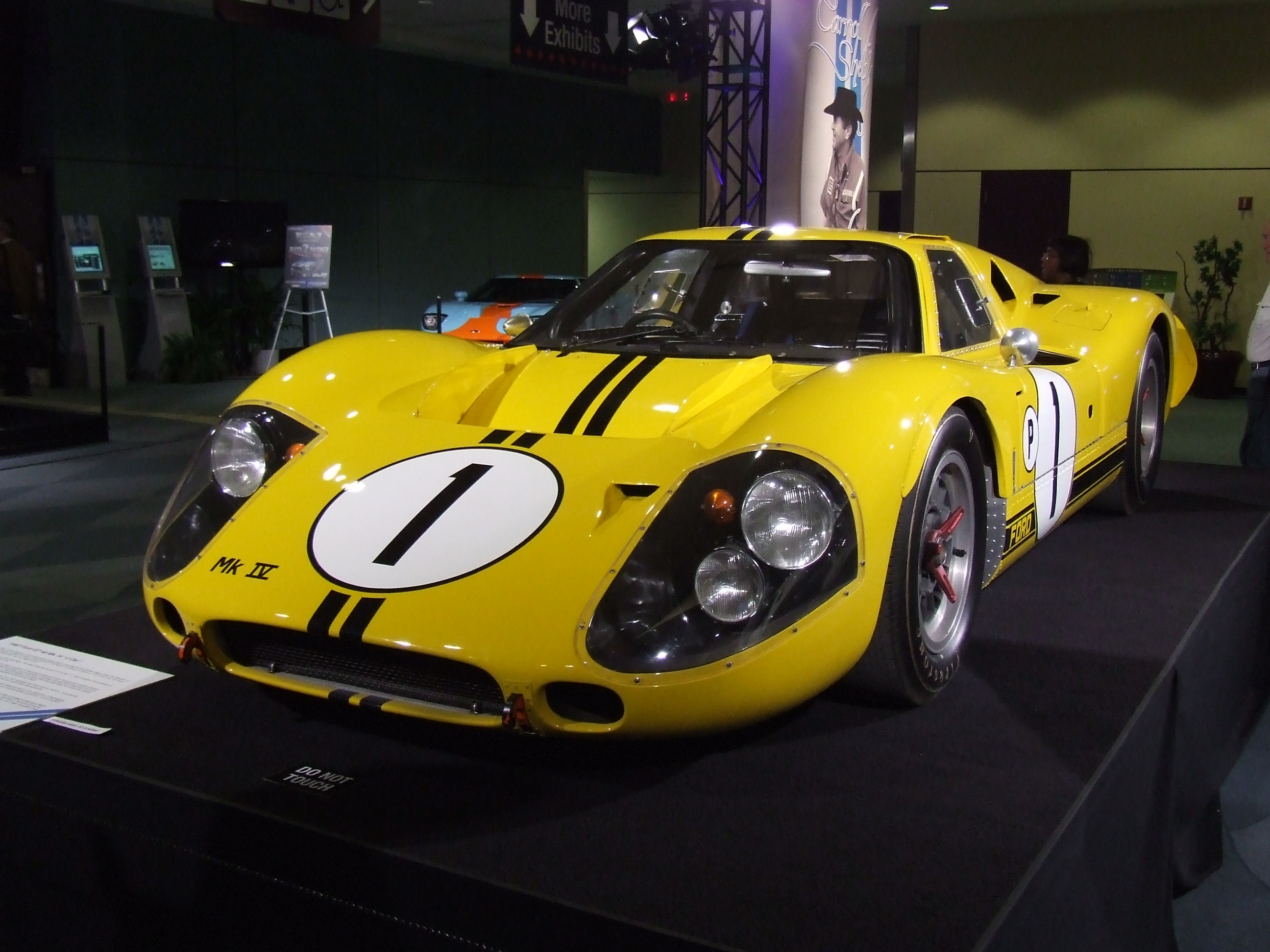
1967 Ford GT40 Mk IV, which was developed from the J-car. This particular car, J-4, won the 1967 12 Hours of Sebring

The Ford J-car was intended to be the successor to the Ford GT40 Mk II, and despite reliability problems, showed potential in the springtime Le Mans trials. After the death of Walt Hansgen in a Mk II while testing at Le Mans in April, Ford decided to shelve the J-car and focus on the proven Mk IIs. Little development was done for the rest of the 1966 World Sports Car Championship season. In August 1966, Shelby American resumed testing and development work with Miles as primary test driver. The J-car featured a breadvan-shaped rear section experimenting with Kammback aerodynamic theories, and a honeycomb panel design supposed to both lighten and stiffen the car, but the design was unproven with high-speed prototype sports cars and resulting mechanical failures while testing.

After almost a day of testing at Riverside International Raceway in the very hot Southern California desert, Ken Miles approached the end of the track's one-mile (1.6 km) downhill back straight at top speed estimated over 200 miles per hour (320 km/h) when the car suddenly flipped and caught fire. The car broke into pieces and ejected Miles, killing him instantly.

After the crash, the aerodynamics of the J-car were greatly modified to correct the rear-end lift generated at race speeds. Years later, Porsche and others had the same problem, as the long, low silhouette of a Kammback-tailed car behaved like an aerofoil aircraft wing and lifted at high speed. Ford executives, under pressure after the second fatal accident in the program in five months, ordered a roll cage similar to those used in NASCAR Grand National competition, be installed in future versions of the car. The significantly revised J-car, renamed the Ford Mk IV, won the only two races in which it was entered, the 1967 Sebring 12 Hours, and the 1967 24 Hours of Le Mans.

Miles is interred at the Abbey of the Psalms Mausoleum of the Hollywood Forever Cemetery in Hollywood, California.

== Awards and honours ==
Miles was posthumously inducted into the Motorsports Hall of Fame of America in 2001. He was inducted in the West Coast Stock Car Hall of Fame in 2020.

== Racing record ==
=== USAC Road Racing Championship results ===
Season	Series	Position	Team	Car
1961	USAC Road Racing Championship	1st	Crandall Industries Incorporated	Porsche 718 RS 61

=== NASCAR Grand National Series results ===
Season	Date	Event	Location	Team	No	Car	Laps	Pos.
1963	November, 3, 1963	Golden State 400	Riverside International Raceway	Holman-Moody Racing	281	Ford Galaxie	139	11th

=== Formula One World Championship results ===
(key)

Year	Entrant	Chassis	Engine	1	2	3	4	5	6	7	8	WDC	Points
1961	Louise Bryden-Brown	Lotus 18	Climax Straight-4	MON	NED	BEL	FRA	GBR	GER	ITA	USA; DNA	NC	0

=== 24 Hours of Le Mans results ===
Year	Class	No	Tyres	Car	Team	Co-Drivers	Laps	Pos.	Class Pos.
1955	S1.5	41		MG EX182; MG L4 1489cc	(United Kingdom) MG Cars Ltd.	(United Kingdom) John Lockett	249	12th	5th
1965	P+5.0	1	G	Ford GT Mk II; Ford 427 V8/90° OHV 6981cc	(United States) Shelby American Inc.	(New Zealand) Bruce McLaren	45	DNF; Gearbox	
1966	P+5.0	1	G	Ford GT Mk II; Ford 427 V8/90° OHV 6982cc	(United States) Shelby American Inc.	(New Zealand) Denny Hulme	360	2nd	2nd
Source: Source:

=== Daytona 2000 km/24 Hours of Daytona results ===
Year	Class	No	Tyres	Car	Team	Co-Drivers	Laps	Pos.	Class Pos.
1965	P+2.0	73	G	Ford GT Mk I Ford 427 V8/90° OHV 7000cc	(United States) Shelby American Inc.	(United States) Lloyd Ruby	327	1st	1st
1966	P+2.0	98	G	Ford GT Mk II; Ford 427 V8/90° OHV 7000cc	(United States) Shelby American Inc.	(United States) Lloyd Ruby	678	1st	1st

=== 12 Hours of Sebring results ===
Year	Class	No	Tyres	Car	Team	Co-Drivers	Laps	Pos.	Class Pos.
1957	S1.5	45		Porsche 550 RS; Porsche F4 2v DOHC 1498cc	(United States) J. Kunstle	(United States) Jean Pierre Kunstle	184	9th	2nd
1958	S1.5	45		Porsche 550 RS; Porsche F4 2v DOHC 1498cc	(United States) Jean Pierre Kunstle	(United States) Jean Pierre Kunstle	59	DNF; Clutch	
1959	S1.5	35		Porsche 718 RSK; Porsche 1498cc	(United States) Precision Motors	(United States) Jack McAfee	173	8th	3rd
1962	GT1.6	42		Sunbeam Alpine; Sunbeam L4 1592cc	(United Kingdom) Rootes Group	(United States) Lew Spencer	25	DNF; Engine	
1963	GT+4.0	12	G	AC Cobra; Ford V8/90° 2v OHV 4727cc	(United States) Ed Hugus	(United States) Phil Hill (United States) Lew Spencer	192	11th	1st
1963	GT+4.0	16	G	AC Cobra; Ford V8/90° 2v OHV 4727cc	(United States) Shelby American Inc.	(United States) Lew Spencer (United States) Dave MacDonald (United States) Fireball Roberts	56	DNF; Steering Arm	
1964	P3+0	1	G	AC Cobra; Ford V8/90° 2v OHV 7000cc	(United States) Shelby American Inc.	(United States) John Morton	81	DNF; Blown Engine	
1965	P+5.0	98	G	Ford GT40; Ford 289 V8/90° 2v OHV 4727cc	(United States) Shelby American Inc.	(New Zealand) Bruce McLaren	192	2nd	1st
1966	P+5.0	1	G	Ford GT40; Ford A V8 OHV 7040cc	(United States) Shelby American Inc.	(United States) Lloyd Ruby	228	1st	1st

== Personal life ==
Ken Miles was married to Mollie and had a son, Peter Miles (born 28 September 1950). He was also a very close friend of Carroll Shelby. Peter was almost 16 when he witnessed his father's death in the prototype J-car crash in 1966. A few months after Ken's death, Peter went to work for Ken's friend Dick Troutman at the Troutman and Barnes custom car shop in Culver City, California. Peter stayed at the workshop for four years. In 1986, Peter joined Precision Performance Inc. (PPI), the Cal Wells-owned Toyota off-road racing operation starting as a fabricator and then a mechanic before becoming the crew chief. Peter was the crew chief for Ivan Stewart when Stewart won the 1991 Nissan 400 in Nevada. In a 2019 interview, Peter said that the last time he went to Le Mans was in 1965 with his father Ken, and he has not returned since.

== In popular culture ==
Miles is portrayed by Christian Bale in the 2019 film Ford v Ferrari (released under the title Le Mans '66 in some parts of Europe). Miles' wife Mollie and his son Peter are portrayed by Caitriona Balfe and Noah Jupe, respectively.

== Bibliography ==
- Evans, Art (2019). Ken Miles: A Scrapbook with Remembrances. Enthusiast Books. ISBN 978-1583883761.
- Friedman, Dave (2021). Ken Miles: The Shelby American Years. North Branch, MN: CarTech Inc. ISBN 978-1-61325-597-1.
