= Watkins Glen =

Watkins Glen can refer to:

- Watkins Glen, New York, a village in New York state
- Watkins Glen International, an automobile race course near the village
  - 6 Hours of Watkins Glen, an annual sports car endurance race
  - NASCAR Cup Series at Watkins Glen International, a set of Stock car racing events in the NASCAR Cup Series
  - NASCAR O'Reilly Auto Parts Series at Watkins Glen International, an annual NASCAR O'Reilly Auto Parts Series race
  - NASCAR Craftsman Truck Series at Watkins Glen International, an annual NASCAR Craftsman Truck Series race
- Watkins Glen Grand Prix Course, 1948–1952, a historic Sports Car Club of America
- Watkins Glen State Park, a state park in Watkins Glen, New York
- Watkins Glen High School, a historic high school building located at Watkins Glen in Schuyler County, New York
- Watkins Glen Commercial Historic District, a national historic district located at Watkins Glen in Schuyler County, New York
- Watkins Glen Review & Express, an American newspaper serving Watkins Glen, New York and the surrounding area
- Summer Jam at Watkins Glen, an outdoor rock festival held "Woodstock-style" outside Watkins Glen, New York in 1973
