= Barron Collier =

American entrepreneur (1873–1939)

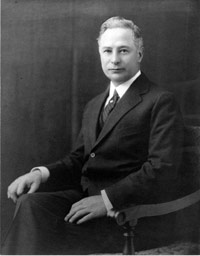
- Born: March 23, 1873; Memphis, Tennessee, U.S.
- Died: March 13, 1939 (aged 65); Manhattan, New York, U.S.
- Resting place: Woodlawn Cemetery
- Occupation: Entrepreneur

Barron Gift Collier (March 23, 1873 – March 13, 1939) was an American advertising entrepreneur who became the largest private landowner and developer in Florida, as well as the owner of a chain of hotels, bus lines, several banks, newspapers, a telephone company, and a steamship line.

== History ==
Collier was born in Memphis, Tennessee. He quit school at 16 to work for the Illinois Central Railroad. He founded the Consolidated Street Railway Advertising Company of New York City within four years. In 1907, Barron Collier married Juliet Gordon Carnes, also a native of Memphis.

In 1911, they visited Fort Myers, Florida on vacation and became interested in the area. They bought Useppa Island in Lee County for $100,000. Over the next decade, the Colliers went on to acquire more than 1,300,000 acres (530,000 ha) of land in Southwest Florida. His holdings were from Ten Thousand Islands to Useppa Island and from present-day Naples into the Everglades City and Big Cypress areas. He also owned 90% of Marco Island. They were the largest private landowners in the state.

Collier was an avid fisherman and established the Izaak Walton Club at their Useppa Island resort; it became one of the most exclusive sporting clubs in the world. Collier next developed golf courses and improved the Rod and Gun Club, a hunting club in Everglades City.

He invested millions of dollars to transform and develop the wilderness, including drainage of the Everglades and construction of the Tamiami Trail. When road construction on the western side (Naples) of the Trail faced financial difficulties, Collier agreed to finish the highway on the condition that a new county be named in his honor. The Florida Legislature obliged, creating Collier County on May 8, 1923, with Everglades (today's Everglades City) as the county seat.

He also had extensive property in Pocantico Hills, New York, which bounded the Rockefeller family estate. The estate was named Overlook and had its own private theater and a private racing club (precursor of the current Sports Car Club of America). The Rockefellers acquired Overlook after his death; it is now part of the Rockefeller State Park Preserve. Collier contributed significantly to the building of the famous Union Church of Pocantico Hills, alongside the Rockefellers.

Collier died March 13, 1939, in Manhattan, survived by his wife and three sons, Barron Jr., Miles, and Samuel (Sam), and was interred at Woodlawn Cemetery in the Bronx, New York.

His family members participated in many sports, including motorsports, and especially road racing. His sons Sam, Miles, and Barron Jr. began hosting informal races in Westchester County, New York, near the Collier estate in Pocantico Hills, in the early 1930s, and founded the Automobile Racing Club of America in 1933. It would be renamed in 1944 as the Sports Car Club of America. Miles, Cameron Argetsinger, and Briggs Cunningham were instrumental in founding the Watkins Glen racing facility near one of their summer retreats. Juliet worried about the risks of racing and tried to influence her sons against it; Sam would indeed die in a racing accident at Watkins Glen in 1950. Briggs's renowned automobile collection was purchased by a member of the Collier family, and is now part of the Revs Institute for Automotive Research in Naples, Florida, which is open to the public.

The Collier County Public School System named Barron G. Collier High School in honor of Barron Gift Collier, Sr.

== Personal relationships ==
- His three sons, Barron Jr., Miles, and Samuel carried on his legacy after inheriting his business. They served in World War II and took charge of the family enterprise afterward. They broadened the company's horizons into various sectors. All three sons had untimely deaths: Barron Jr. in 1976, Samuel in a 1950 car racing accident, and Miles from a viral infection in 1954. They were passionate about car racing and founded the Automobile Racing Club of America.
- John H. Phipps, his friend and business collaborator, was a wealthy industrialist and philanthropist. They worked together on several projects, including the development of Useppa Island and the construction of the Hotel Pennsylvania. They were also avid fishers and hunters and were members of the Izaak Walton Club on Useppa Island.
- His mentor and friend, Theodore Roosevelt, the 26th president of the United States, greatly influenced him. They met in 1905 and shared mutual admiration. Collier supported Roosevelt's conservation projects and progressive stances. He visited Roosevelt at Sagamore Hill and went on a hunting expedition with him in Louisiana.
- His business associate, Henry Flagler, was instrumental in Collier's vision for Florida. Both men aimed to turn Florida into a modern state and a travel hotspot. Collier gained insights from Flagler's past experiences in developing Florida's east coast. He even collaborated with Flagler's Atlantic Coast Line Railroad to bring rail service to Southwest Florida.

== Political connections ==
Collier had relationships with several U.S. Presidents, including Theodore Roosevelt, Woodrow Wilson, Calvin Coolidge, and Herbert Hoover. He also maintained ties with influential senators, governors, and diplomats. His political involvements covered a range of causes, such as the promotion of the Good Roads Movement, the establishment of the Everglades National Park, and support for the League of Nations.
