= Schuyler County Courthouse =

Schuyler County Courthouse may refer to:

- Schuyler County Courthouse (Illinois)
- Schuyler County Courthouse Complex (New York)
