= Revs Institute =

- Established: 2008; 18 years ago
- Location: 2500 S. Horseshoe Drive; Naples, Florida; United States
- Coordinates: 26.161940°N 81.776560°W
- Type: Automotive museum
- Director: Jonathan Witmer
- Curator: Scott George
- Website: www.revsinstitute.org

The Revs Institute is an automotive museum located in Naples, Florida. The Revs Institute is a nonprofit organization specializing in automobile history, research and related educational programs. The Revs Institute houses the Miles Collier Collections of over 100 significant automobiles built between 1896 and 1995, including some of the rarest cars and race cars in the world. It also has one of the largest specialized automotive libraries in the world. A 12,000-square-foot workshop is also dedicated to auto restoration and the development of innovate ways to care for antique machinery.

== History ==
The Revs Institute was founded by Miles Collier in 2008. Collier's grandfather was New York City advertising mogul and real estate developer Barron Collier who founded Collier County, Florida in 1923. Collier's father, C. Miles Collier, and uncle Sam Collier played an outsized role in the emergence of sports-car racing in the United States.

== Collections ==
The automobiles in the Miles Collier Collections at the Revs Institute are working vehicles. At any given time, some are loaned to other museums or events for exhibition, run in historic races, undergoing maintenance or preservation work, or receiving a major restoration. The first floor holds mostly sports cars, with a wing dedicated to Porsche. Most of the collection's race cars are on the second floor. Some of the cars in the collection on display include:

- 1948 Ferrari Tipo 166
- 1939 Mercedes-Benz W154 Silver Arrow
- 1937 Delahaye
- 1959 Porsche RSK
- 1950 Cadillac Series 61 "Le Monstre"
- 1967 Porsche 911R

== Gallery ==
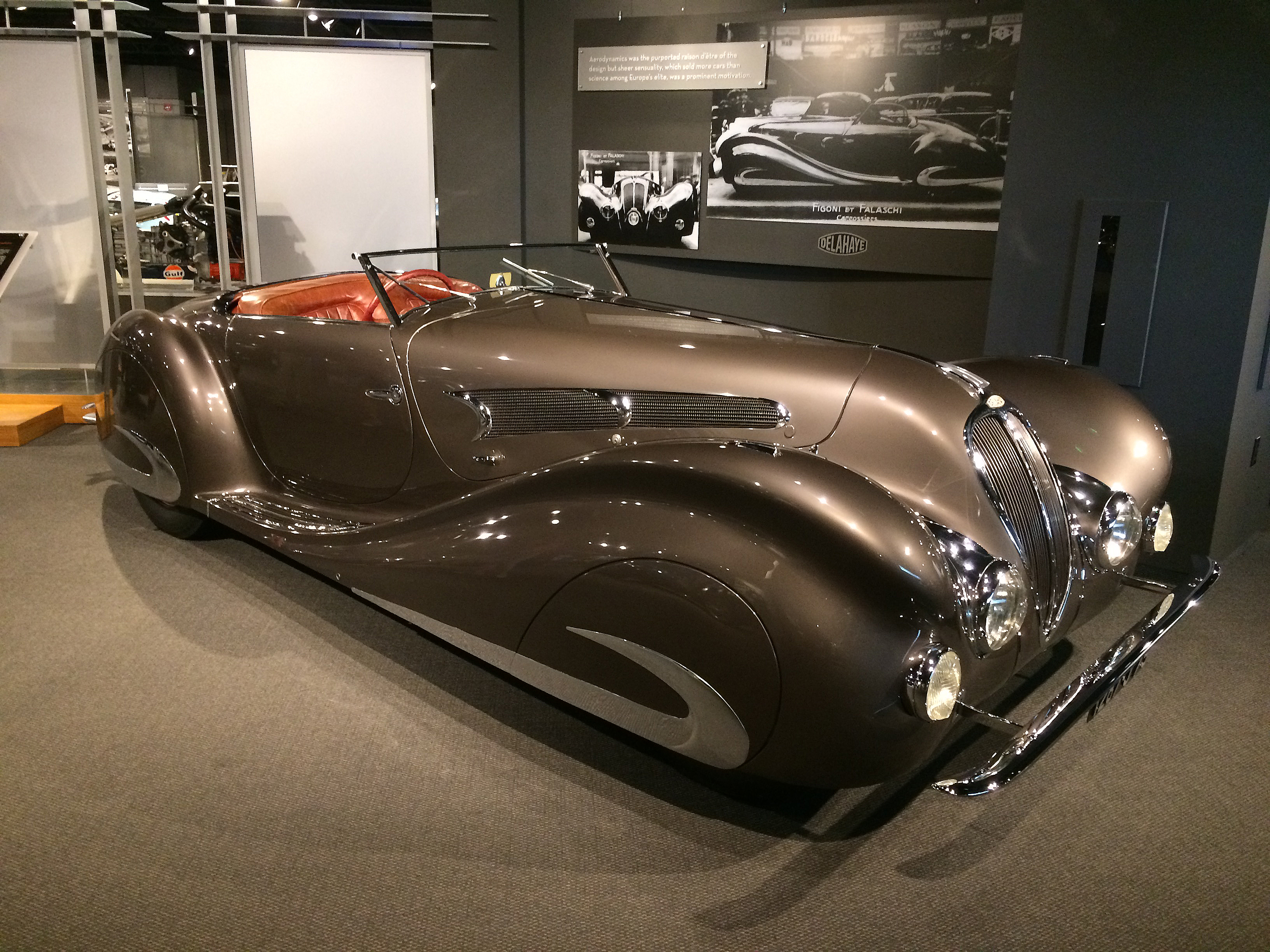
1937 Delahaye 135 MS Special Roadster

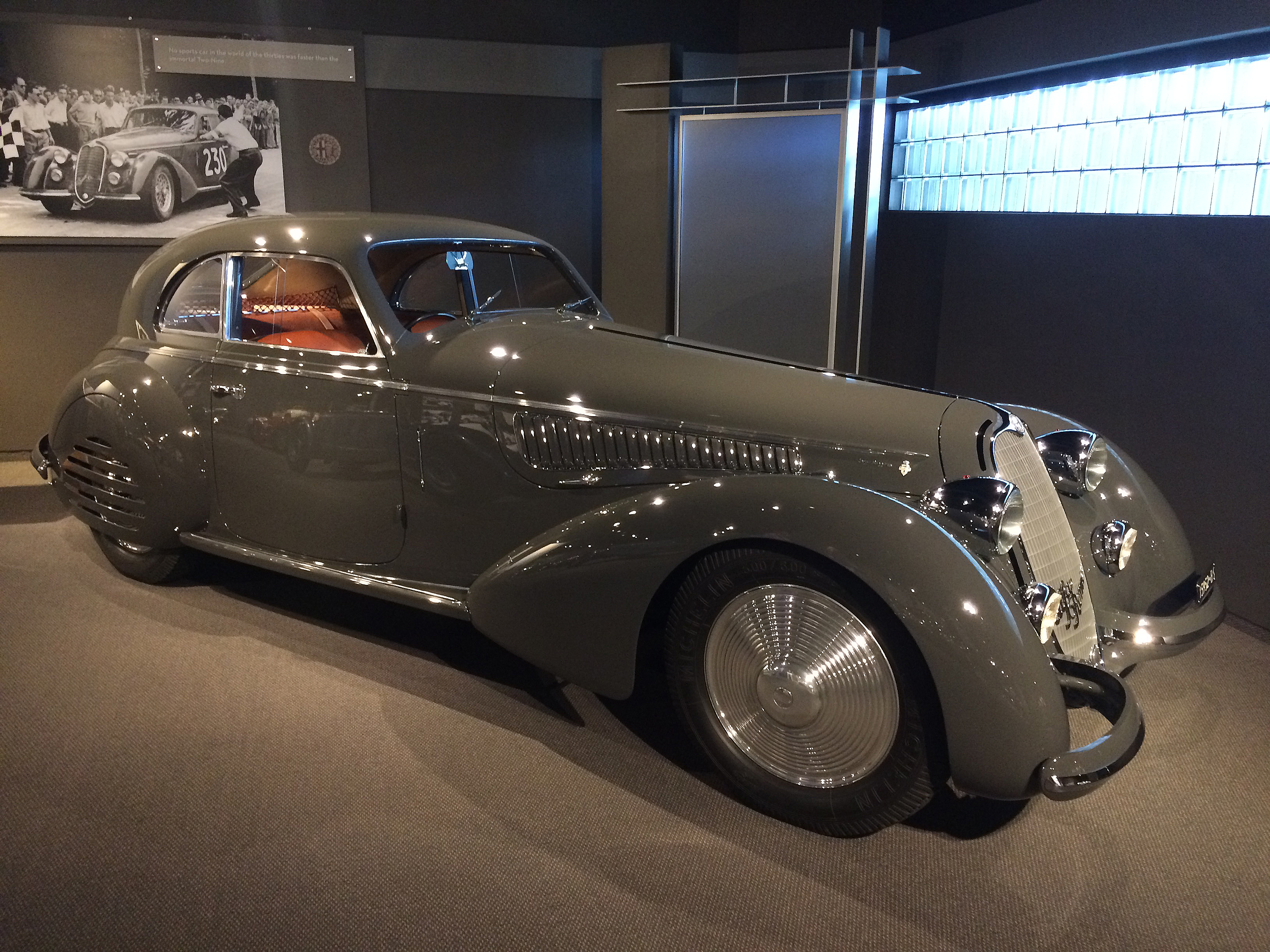
1938 Alfa Romeo 8C 2900B Lungo Berlinetta Touring

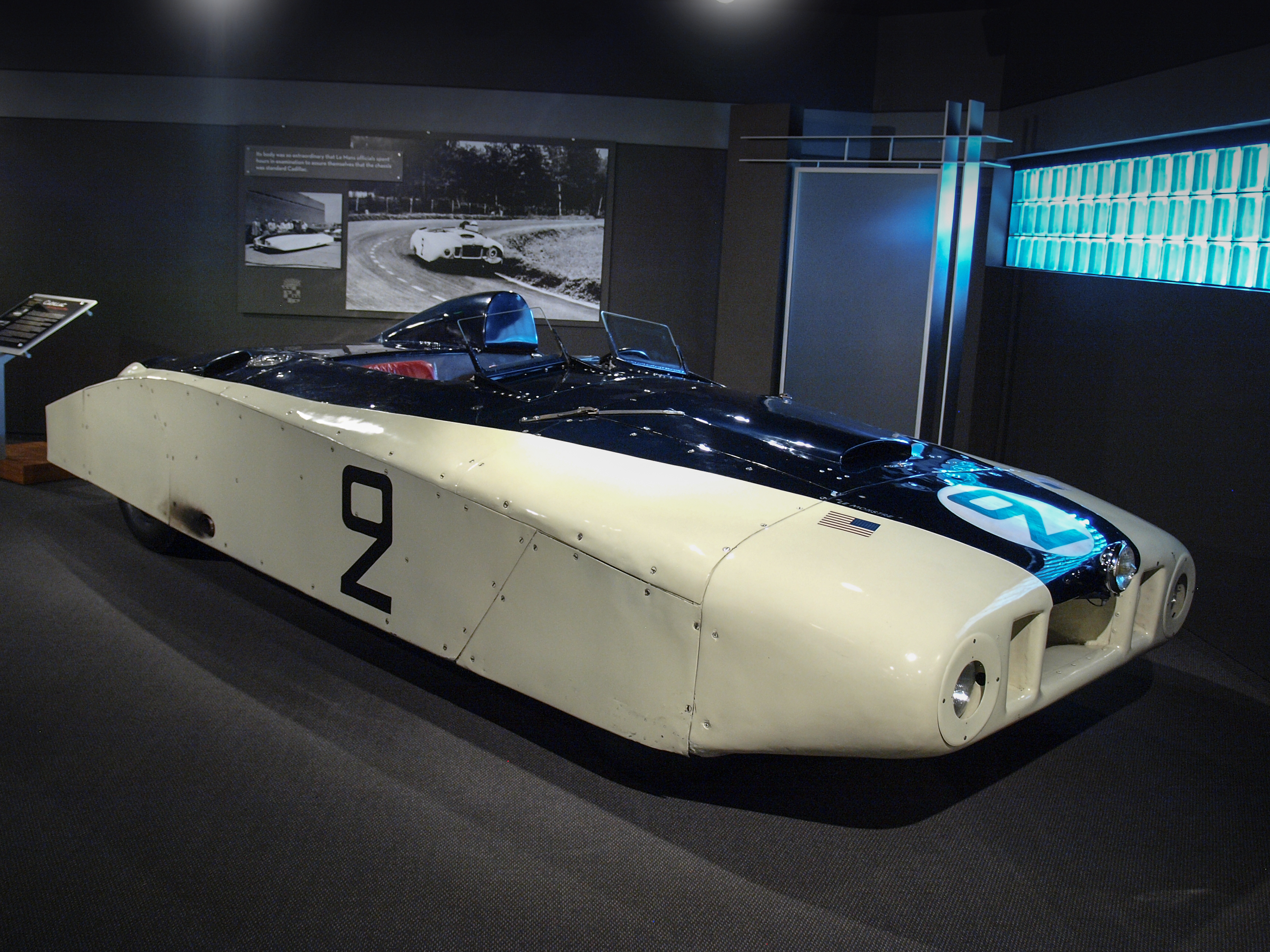
Cadillac Series 61 "Le Monstre" of the 1950 Le Mans 24h

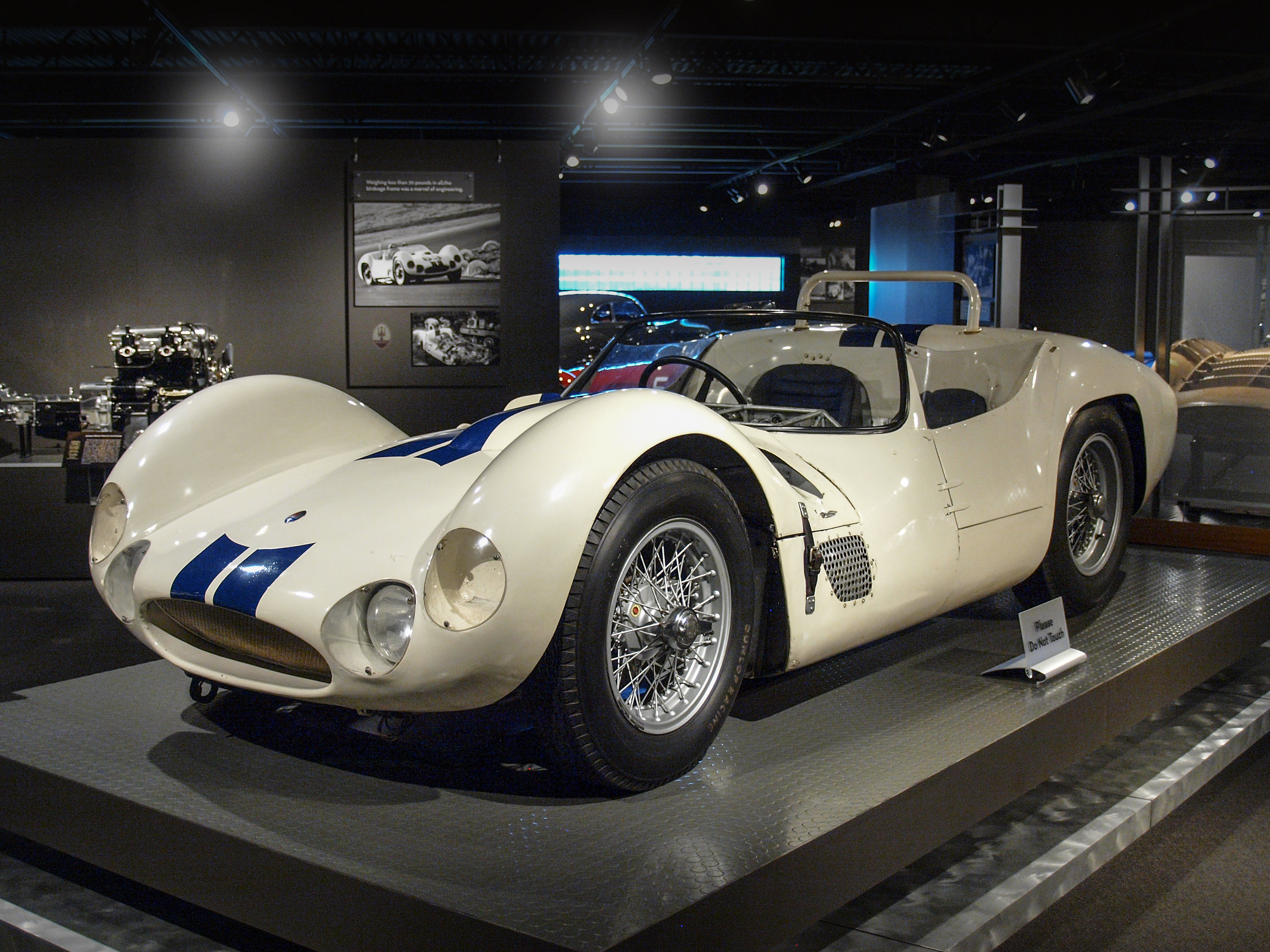
1961 Maserati Tipo 60 "Birdcage"
