= Sam Collier =

American racing driver (1912–1950)

Samuel Carnes Collier
- Born: May 14, 1912; United States
- Died: September 23, 1950 (aged 38); Montour Falls, New York, U.S.
- Education: Yale University (BA, 1935)
- Occupations: Advertising entrepreneur, auto racer
- Known for: Co-founder of Automobile Racing Club of America; founder of Motor Sport, Inc.
- Spouse: Dixie Thompson (m. 1936)
- Children: 3
- Parent: Barron Gift Collier Juliet Gordon Carnes
- Relatives: (Cowles) Miles Collier (brother) Barron Collier Jr. (brother)

Samuel Carnes Collier (May 14, 1912 – September 23, 1950) was an American advertising entrepreneur and auto racer. He made his fortune in streetcar advertising.

== Family ==
Collier was the son of Barron Gift Collier and Juliet Gordon Carnes, the founders of Collier County, Florida. He had two brothers, (Cowles) Miles Collier and Baron Collier Jr.

He married Dixie Thompson from Honolulu in 1936. Together they had three children, Samuel Carnes Collier Jr., Terry Collier and Richard Collier.

== Career ==
As a teenager, Collier completed three seasons as a designer, proprietor, and manager of the Overlook Theatre on the grounds of the Collier family estate in Pocantico Hills, New York. He started racing cars on a private racing course built on the estate. He attended Yale where he was a member of Skull and Bones. He graduated in 1935. He served in World War II as a Navy pilot.

"He was one of the founders of the Automobile Racing Club of America, competed in the 1939 Alpine Trial, and was the founder of the concern of Motor Sport, Inc., sole American importers of M.G. cars."

In 1949 Collier finished third overall, and first in Class E, in the Seneca Cup Race, at Watkins Glen, New York, driving a supercharged MG.

Collier drove in the 1950 24 Hours of Le Mans: "Of the two Cadillacs entered by Briggs Cunningham, the strictly stock saloon, driven by the brothers Miles and Sam Collier, which had been nicknamed 'Clumsy Pup', had come in tenth at an average of 81.398 m.p.h."

== Death ==
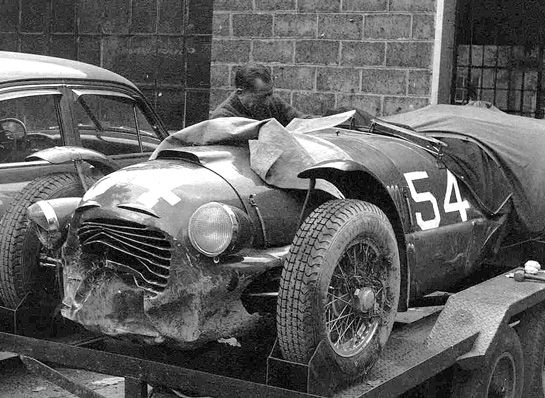
The 1948 Ferrari 166 s/n 016i after the accident. The mechanic is Alfred Momo.

Samuel was killed while leading the (September 23) 1950 Watkins Glen Grand Prix, held on public roads in and around the village of Watkins Glen, New York, when the Ferrari 166 that he was driving left the road. He died at 6:30 pm in Montour Falls. The accident received front-page coverage in the New York press. A memorial stone was placed at the spot where Sam Collier left the road. His brother, Miles, gave up racing soon thereafter and died of polio in 1954. Samuel was honored in 1995 in front of the Court House at that year's Watkins Glen Grand Prix Festival.
