= Pocantico Hills, New York =

- Hamlet
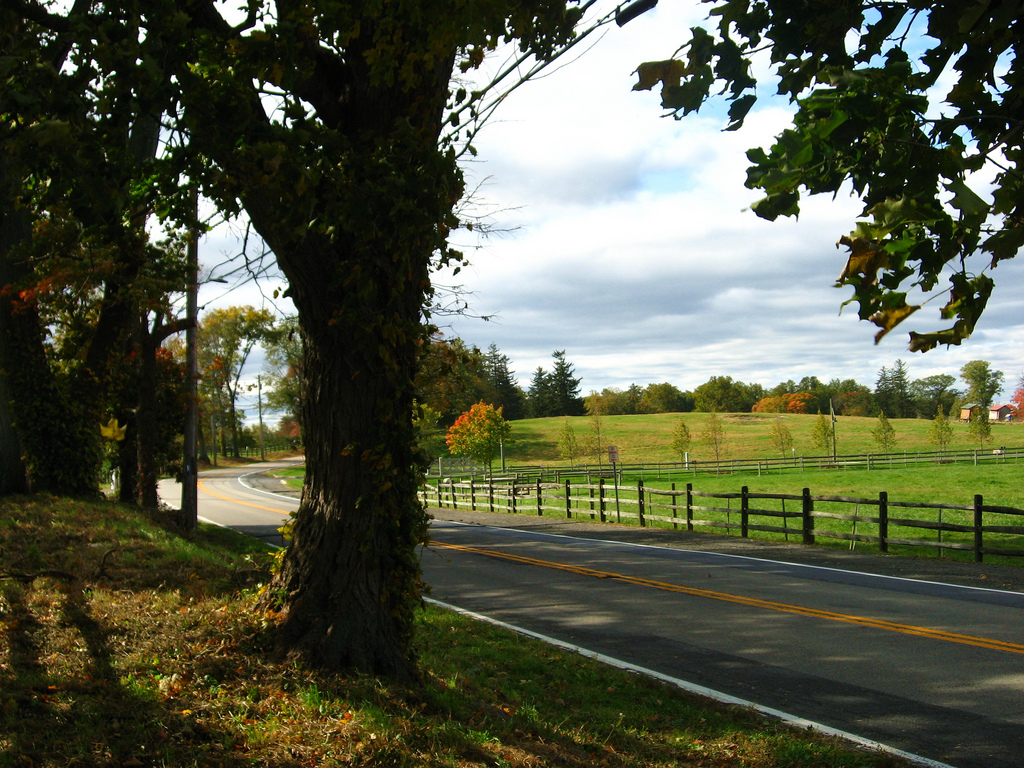
- Pocantico Hills in autumn

- Pocantico Hills within the state of New York
- Coordinates: 41°5′40″N 73°50′9″W
- Country: United States
- State: New York
- County: Westchester County
- Town: Mount Pleasant
- Elevation: 541 ft (165 m)
- Time zone: UTC-5 (Eastern (EST))
  - Summer (DST): UTC-4 (EDT)
- ZIP code: 10591
- Area code: 914

Pocantico Hills is an unincorporated hamlet in the town of Mount Pleasant, Westchester County, New York, United States, about 28 miles (45 km) north of Midtown Manhattan in New York City. It occupies the area of approximately 2.5 square miles (6.5 km^{2}).

While official data and wider definitions vary, longtime residents consider only the houses immediately surrounding the historical Rockefeller family estate (anchored by Kykuit, the family seat built by John D. Rockefeller Sr.) to be the true Pocantico Hills. The district served by the Pocantico Hills Fire Department contains 270 households (as of 2025). The hamlet is almost completely surrounded by the Rockefeller State Park Preserve. It shares the postal code, 10591, with the nearby villages of Sleepy Hollow and Tarrytown.

== History ==
The area was originally settled by Native Americans of the Wecquaesgeek tribes; "Pocantico" means "stream between two hills", a reference to the meandering Pocantico River. The area was once rich in flint, which early Native Americans used for their stone tools and weapons.

The hamlet was once a part of Philipsburg Manor. During the American Revolutionary War, the last lord of the manor, Frederick Philipse III, who was a Loyalist, was attainted for treason. Philipsburg Manor was confiscated and sold at public auction. The Upper Mills area of the manor was purchased in 1785 by the New York merchant Gerard Garret Beekman Jr., who later expanded his property to include the Pocantico Hills area.

His son, Stephen (who spelled his last name as Beeckman), became a respected physician and married a daughter of George Clinton, the first governor of New York and later vice president of the United States. Dr. Stephen D. Beeckman settled in the inland hilltop portion of the Beekman family property, which he inherited, building his residence on the area's highest ground. In the mid-19th century, the Pocantico Hills area was known as Beeckmantown (while the waterfront portion of the Beekman family property, the core of the present-day village of Sleepy Hollow, had been known as Beekman Town since the early 19th century).

In the 1870s, this area was also known as Tarrytown Heights.

John D. Rockefeller, founder of Standard Oil, began buying land in Pocantico Hills in 1893. At the time, southwestern Westchester County was almost entirely rural, with “large areas of woodlands, lakes, fields and streams all teeming with wildlife,” as David Rockefeller wrote in his Memoirs. He continued:

Eventually the family accumulated about 3,400 acres that surrounded and included almost all of the little village of Pocantico Hills, where most of the residents worked for the family and lived in houses owned by Grandfather.
The wooden house my grandparents occupied (the Parsons-Wentworth House) burned down in 1901. Rather than rebuild, they simply moved down the hill to a smaller place, known as the Kent House, where they were perfectly content. After a great deal of prodding by Father (John D. Rockefeller Jr.) they finally built a larger and more substantial house near where the original structure had stood. Grandfather occupied Kykuit from 1912 until his death in 1937, and then Mother and Father moved into it.

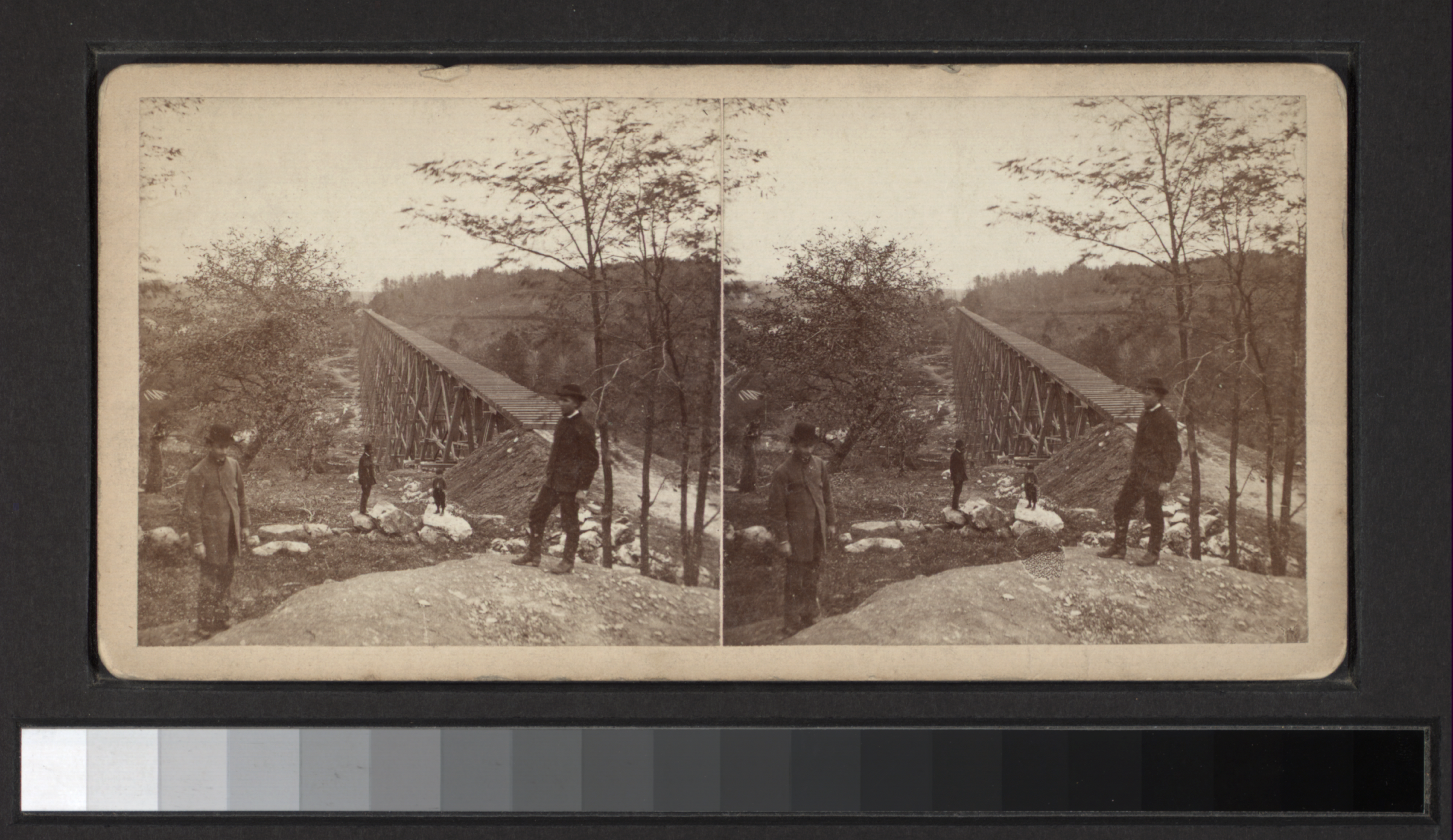
Trestle Bridge, at East Tarry Town, N.Y. on the New York, Boston & Montreal Railway, 1873

In 1880, the "Old Put" Railroad ran from New York to Brewster. The section between East View and Pocantico Hills travelled over an 80-foot-high trestle across the marsh-filled Storm Brook Valley. Because of the dangers of crossing the bridge, which often required that trains slow down to a crawl, the line was rerouted west around that valley in 1881. The bridge was torn down in 1883, and the valley became the Tarrytown Reservoir in the 1890s, after the damming of Storm Brook. The railroad ran through the Rockefeller property. In 1928, John D. Rockefeller Jr. negotiated with the New York Central Railroad to relocate the line along the Saw Mill River, costing $200,000, which Rockefeller Jr. paid. When the De La Salle Brothers' property in Amawalk was condemned to make way for the New Croton Reservoir, they moved the novitiate to Pocantico. Around 1929, the Rockefeller family purchased the property.

John D. Rockefeller Jr.'s patriarchal role in the small Pocantico Hills community is amusingly illustrated by this quote from a 1943 article in The New York Times about the opening of the Philipsburg Manor House museum:

NORTH TARRYTOWN, N. Y., July 4 John D. Rockefeller Jr. was the principal speaker this afternoon when the Historical Society of the Tarrytowns dedicated its $500,000 restoration of Philipse Castle and Philipse Manor as a shrine, museum and society headquarters on Albany Post Road opposite the old Sleepy Hollow Church immortalized by Washington Irving. Mr. Rockefeller and his wife drove two miles from their Pocantico Hills estate to the exercises in a 1902 electric runabout. A hundred residents of the hamlet of Pocantico Hills rode to the manor in three haywagons pulled by Mr. Rockefeller's horses.

Prominent advertising entrepreneur Barron Collier, for whom Florida's Collier County is named, also had extensive property in Pocantico Hills, which bounded the Rockefeller family estate. Barron's estate, named Overlook, had its own private theater and a private auto racing club; their race course was known as the "Sleepy Hollow Ring". The area around Pocantico Hills had a long history of auto racing. The First American International Road Race was hosted by the nearby village of Briarcliff Manor in 1908. In the early 1930s, Collier's sons, Sam, Miles, and Barron Jr., began hosting amateur car races in the area. In 1933, they founded the Automobile Racing Club of America (precursor of the current Sports Car Club of America). Sam Collier became a prominent race car driver; he died in a racing accident at Watkins Glen International in 1950. Barron Collier contributed significantly to the building of the famous Union Church of Pocantico Hills, alongside the Rockefellers, who acquired Overlook after his death in 1939. It is now part of the Rockefeller State Park Preserve.

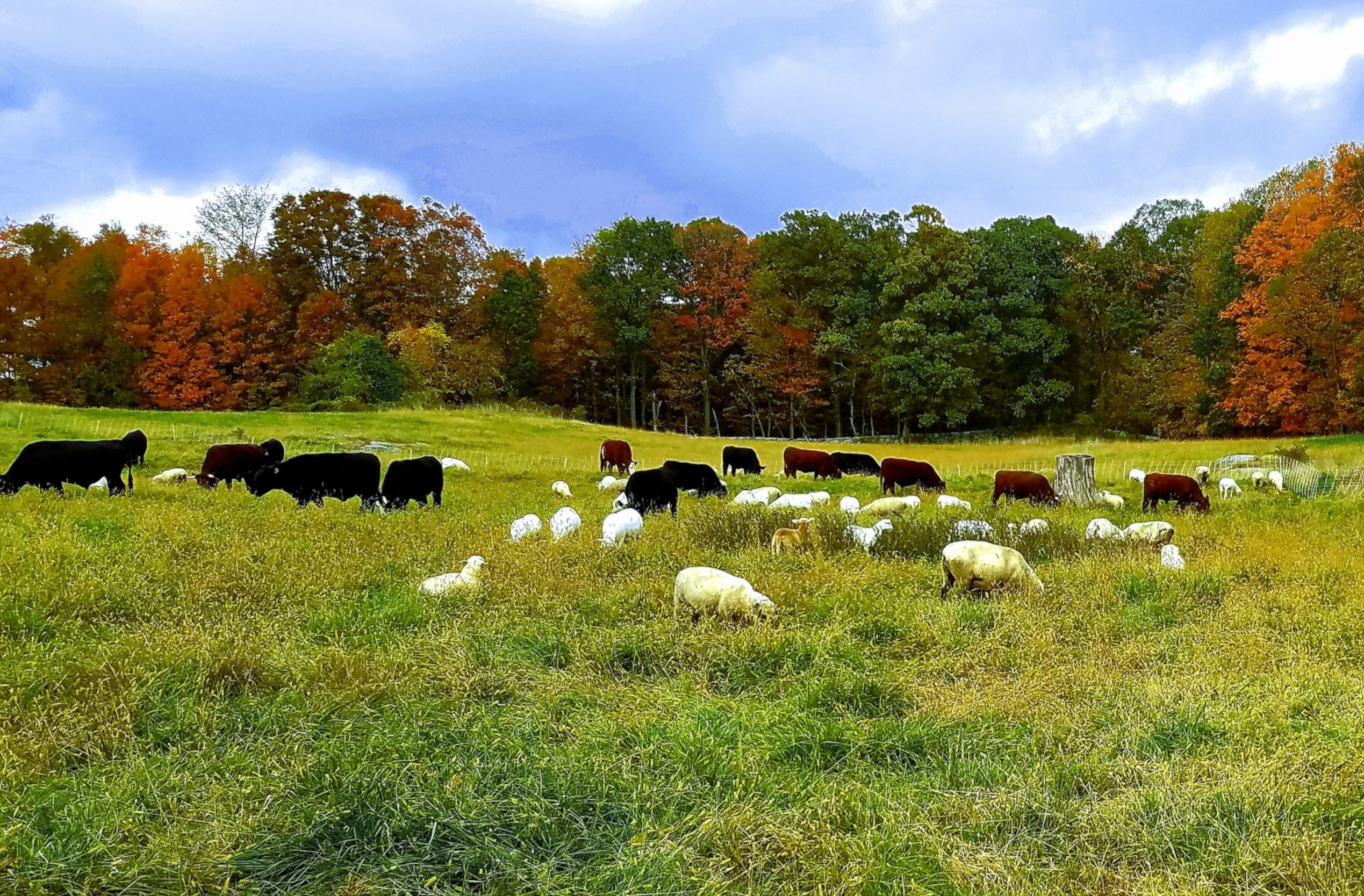
Livestock of the Stone Barns Center for Food and Agriculture on a pasture in Pocantico Hills

While Westchester County's population surged during the post-WWII suburbanization, Pocantico Hills remained stable at less than 1,000 residents because it was surrounded by the Rockefeller family's private lands. In 1970, the family officially announced their intention to preserve the land for the public interest rather than develop it.

The Stone Barns Center for Food & Agriculture in Pocantico Hills was established in 2004 by David Rockefeller and his daughter, Peggy Dulany, on eighty acres of the Rockefeller State Park Preserve to demonstrate multicultural, self-sustaining farming techniques. The center is allied to the Rockefeller family-funded Pocantico Central School. It is host to the Blue Hill restaurant, a high-end eatery which features foodstuffs grown (or raised) on the Stone Barns property. The Stone Barns Center also sells organic local produce, meat, and eggs to local businesses in the Pocantico Hills area.

For residences and notable buildings on the Rockefeller family estate, including the Pocantico Conference Center of the Rockefeller Brothers Fund and the Rockefeller Archive Center, see Kykuit--Pocantico, the family estate.

== Education ==
The hamlet is a part of the Pocantico Hills Central School District, and the Pocantico Hills School, a K-8 school, has a diverse district that lies across town and village borders, including areas of Sleepy Hollow, Pleasantville, Briarcliff Manor, and Elmsford, New York. On graduating from Pocantico Hills School, as there is no high school for the district students to attend, they are afforded the choice of attending Sleepy Hollow High School, Briarcliff, or Pleasantville High School.

== Churches ==
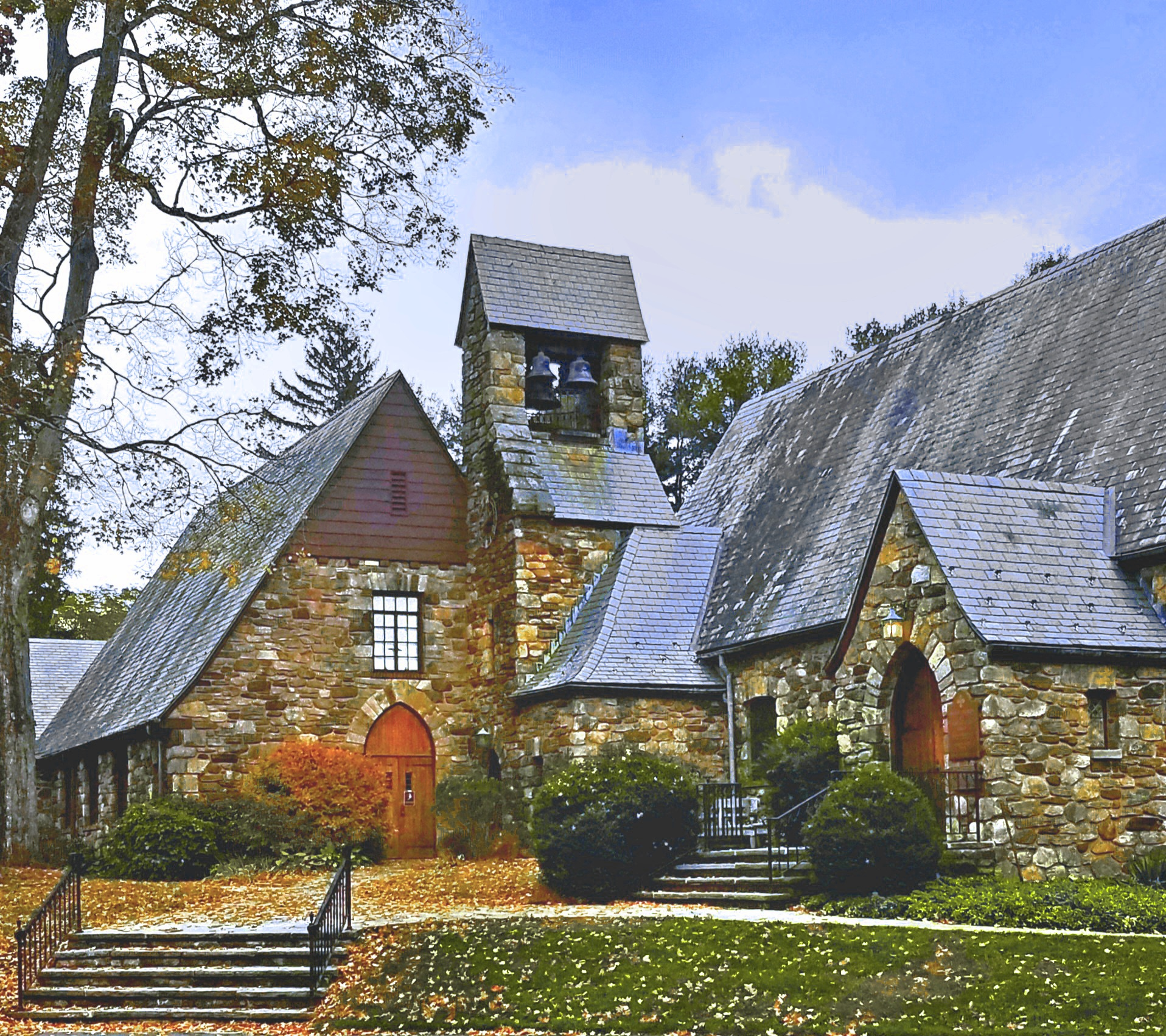
Union Church of Pocantico Hills

The Roman Catholic Parish of the Magdalene began in 1893 as a mission Church of St. Teresa of Avila parish in North Tarrytown to serve about forty families in Pocantico Hills and Eastview. The Church was dedicated in September 1895. A significant benefactor of the parish was grocery store magnate James Butler, whose estate was in nearby Eastview.

The Union Church of Pocantico Hills, a non-denominational Christian congregation, began as a Sunday school group operating within a local community hall. Construction of the fieldstone building was funded primarily by John D. Rockefeller Jr. in 1921, as part of his plans to develop the community of Pocantico Hills. The stone and timber for the interior were harvested from the Rockefeller estate. The church features stained glass windows by Henri Matisse and Marc Chagall. The Matisse window was his final piece prior to his death in 1954 and was commissioned by Nelson A. Rockefeller in memory of his mother, Abby Aldrich Rockefeller, one of the founders of the Museum of Modern Art. In 2006, the church was listed in the National Register of Historic Places.

== Government ==
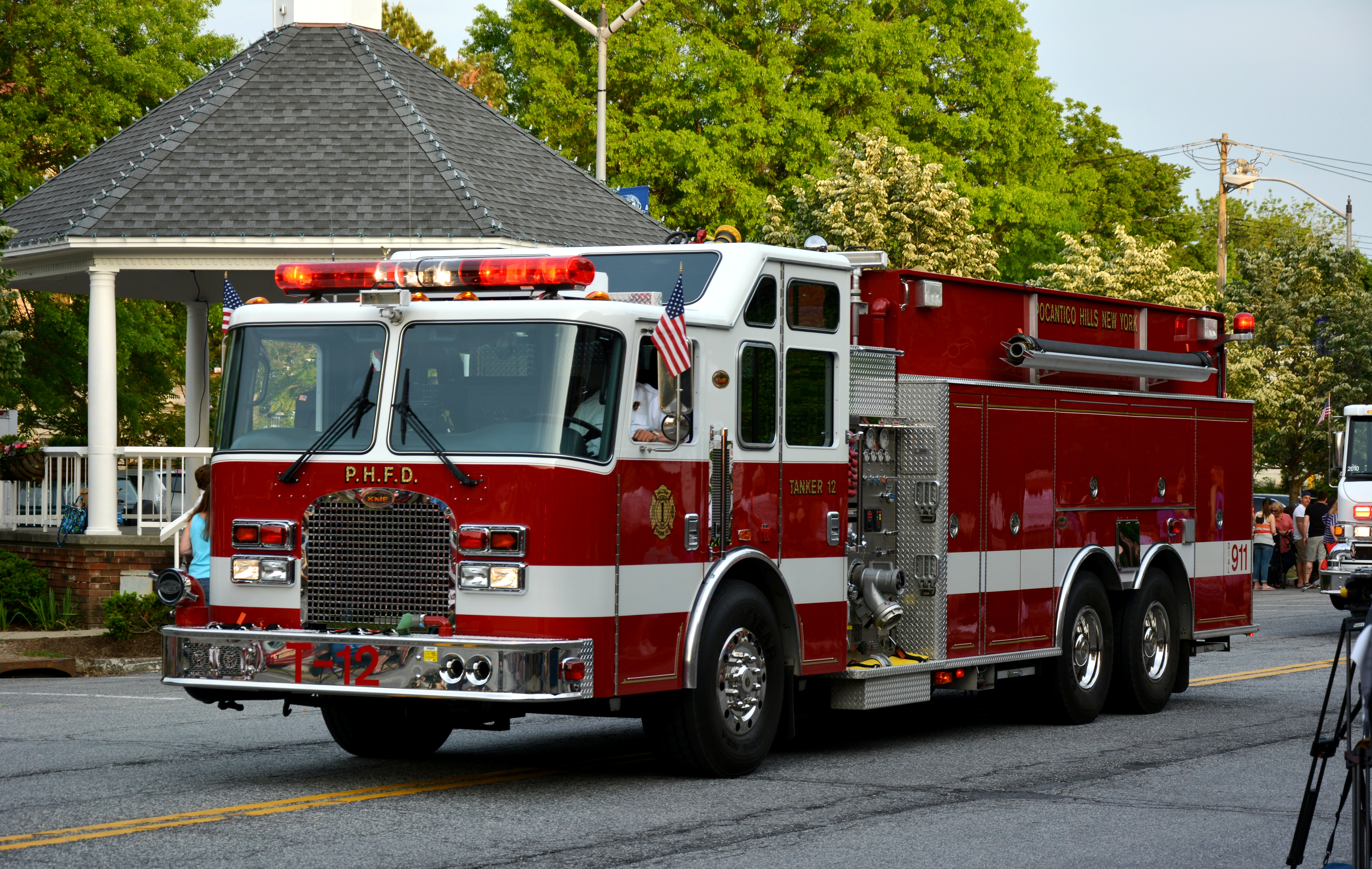
A Pocantico FD Tanker 12 in a Pleasantville parade, May 2015

The hamlet is within and governed by the town of Mount Pleasant, New York.

Emergency services stem from a variety of sources, with policing services provided by the Town of Mount Pleasant Police Department, fire protection services provided from the all-volunteer Pocantico Hills Fire Department, and emergency medical services from a combination of the Sleepy Hollow Volunteer Ambulance Corps (SHVAC), Pleasantville Volunteer Ambulance Corps (PVAC), and Westchester EMS. The fire department has a tanker truck which often responds mutual-aid to neighboring fire districts when called upon. It has assisted fire related incidents in the villages of Pleasantville, Briarcliff Manor, Croton-on-Hudson, Ossining, Sleepy Hollow, Tarrytown, Irvington, and Elmsford as well as the hamlets Archville, Hawthorne, Thornwood, and Valhalla.

The first volunteer fire department, Liberty Hook and Ladder Company, was organized in 1904.

== Notable people ==
- Marianne Hagan (b. 1968), actress and writer, was raised in Pocantico Hills
- Dr. Stephen D. Beeckman, member of New York's prominent Beekman family, and his wife Maria, daughter of Vice President George Clinton, were founding residents of the community; Pocantico Hills was once known as Beeckmantown
- Barron Collier, an advertising mogul, had a large summer estate at Pocantico Hills; his three sons hosted automobile races in the area and founded a car-racing club that would become the Sports Car Club of America; one of them, Sam Collier, became a prominent race car driver
- Numerous members of the Rockefeller family grew up and/or lived on the family estate at Pocantico Hills
