= Schuyler County Courthouse Complex =

- U.S. National Register of Historic Places
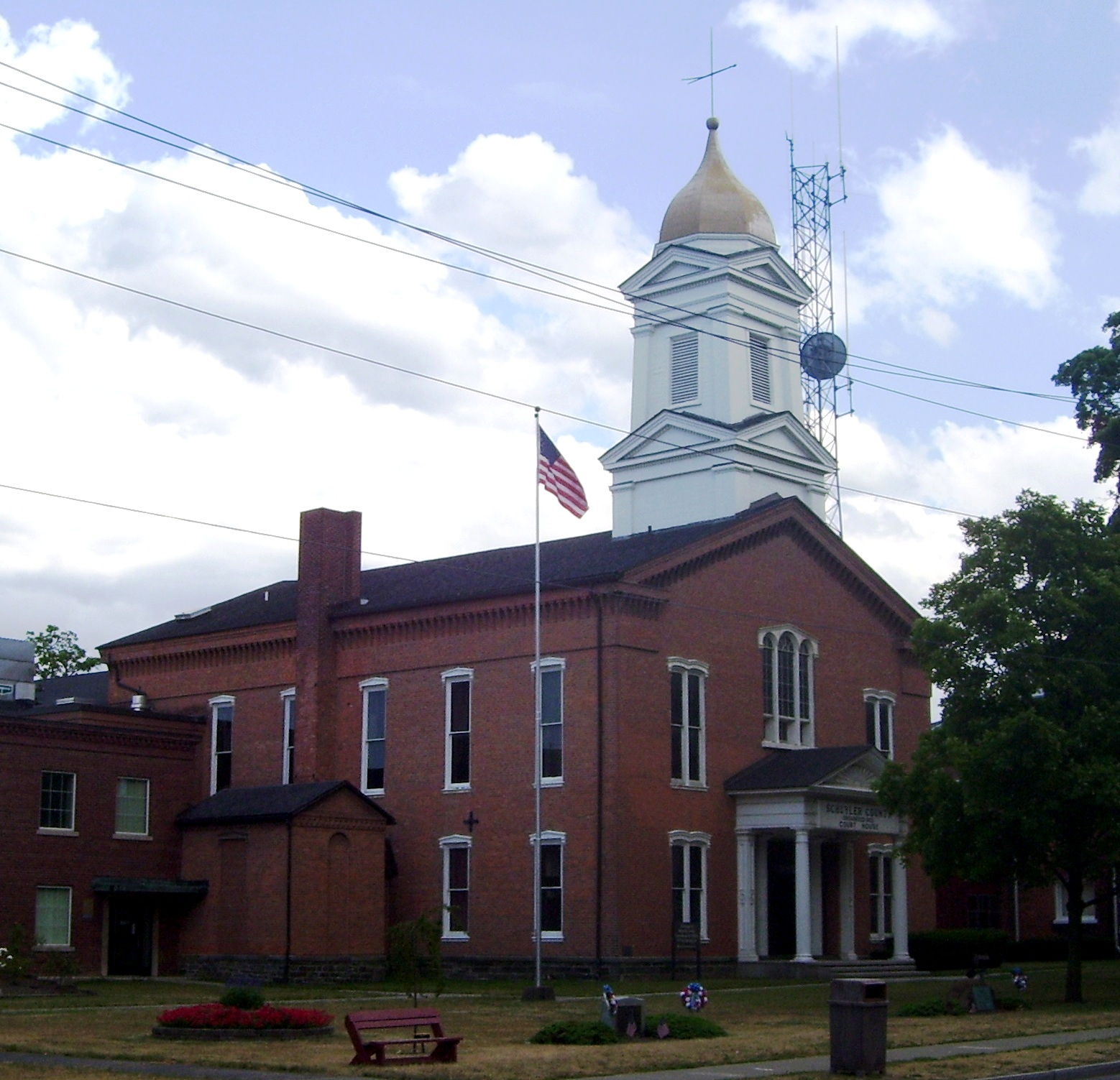
- Schuyler County Courthouse

- Location within New York Location within the United States
- Location: N. Franklin Street; Watkins Glen, New York
- Coordinates: 42°22′36″N 76°52′16″W
- Area: 1.3 acres (0.53 ha)
- Built: 1855
- NRHP reference No.: 74001305
- Added to NRHP: June 05, 1974

The Schuyler County Courthouse Complex is a historic courthouse complex located on North Franklin Street between 9th and 10th Streets in Watkins Glen in Schuyler County, New York. It consists of a three-building government complex. The courthouse, built in 1855, is a two-story, rectangular brick building on a stone foundation. It features an inset square tower with an ogee roof and weather vane. It also has a small pedimented porch supported by Doric order columns. The Sheriff's residence is a two-story brick structure with a hipped roof and cupola. The third building is the one-story Clerk's office that measures 22 feet by 38 feet.

It was listed on the National Register of Historic Places in 1974.

== Gallery ==
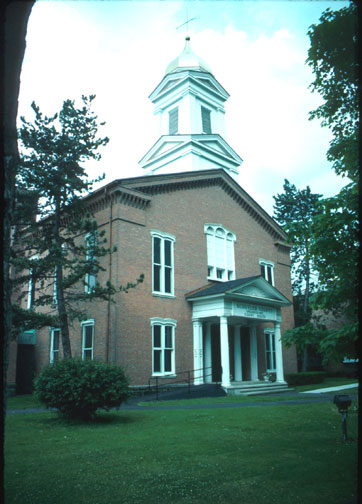
Schuyler County Courthouse, June 1993

== See also ==
- National Register of Historic Places listings in Schuyler County, New York
