= Watkins Glen Commercial Historic District =

Historic district in New York, United States

- U.S. National Register of Historic Places
- U.S. Historic district
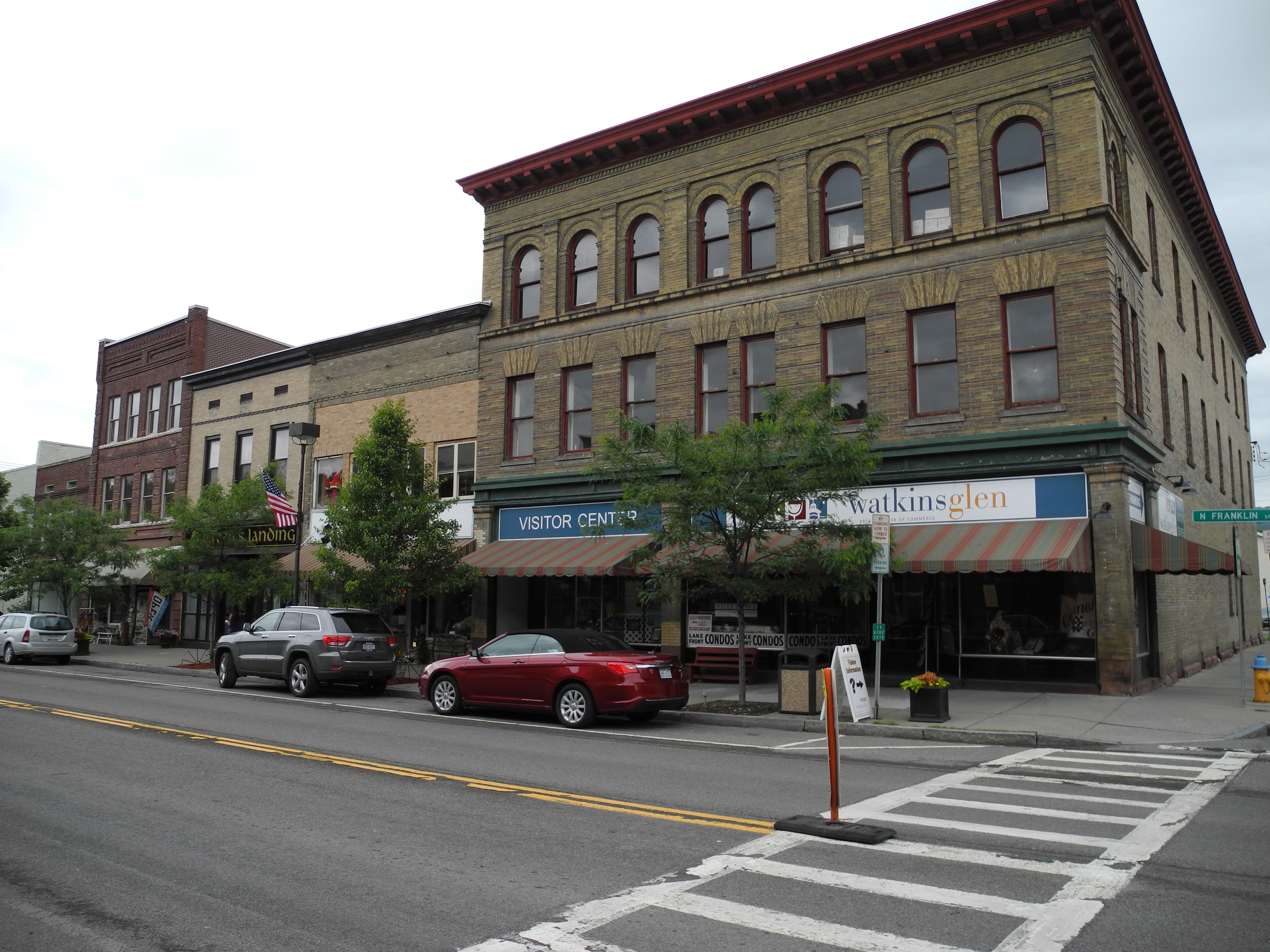
- Watkins Glen Commercial Historic District, June 2013

- Location within New York Location within the United States
- Location: 108-400 & 201-317 N. Franklin St., 111 W. 4th St. & 215 S. Madison St., Watkins Glen, New York
- Coordinates: 42°22′53″N 76°52′26″W
- Area: 4.49 acres (1.82 ha)
- Built: 1844-1939
- Architect: Freeburg, Raymond, etc.
- Architectural style: Gothic Revival
- NRHP reference No.: 11001009
- Added to NRHP: January 4, 2012

Watkins Glen Commercial Historic District is a national historic district located at Watkins Glen in Schuyler County, New York. It encompasses 33 contributing buildings in the central business district of Watkins Glen. It developed between about 1844 and 1939 and includes notable examples of Greek Revival, Italianate, Classical Revival, Colonial Revival, Second Empire and Romanesque Revival style architecture. Notable buildings include the Watkins Glen Municipal Building (1939), Watkins Glen Fire Station (1935), Watkins State Bank (1911), Hotel Kendall (1891), Haring Building (1844), former Watkins Post Office (1905), Freer Opera House (c. 1860), and the Durand Block (1897).

It was listed on the National Register of Historic Places in 2012.
