= Watkins Glen Public Library =

Coordinates: 42°22′19.1″N 76°51′58.3″W

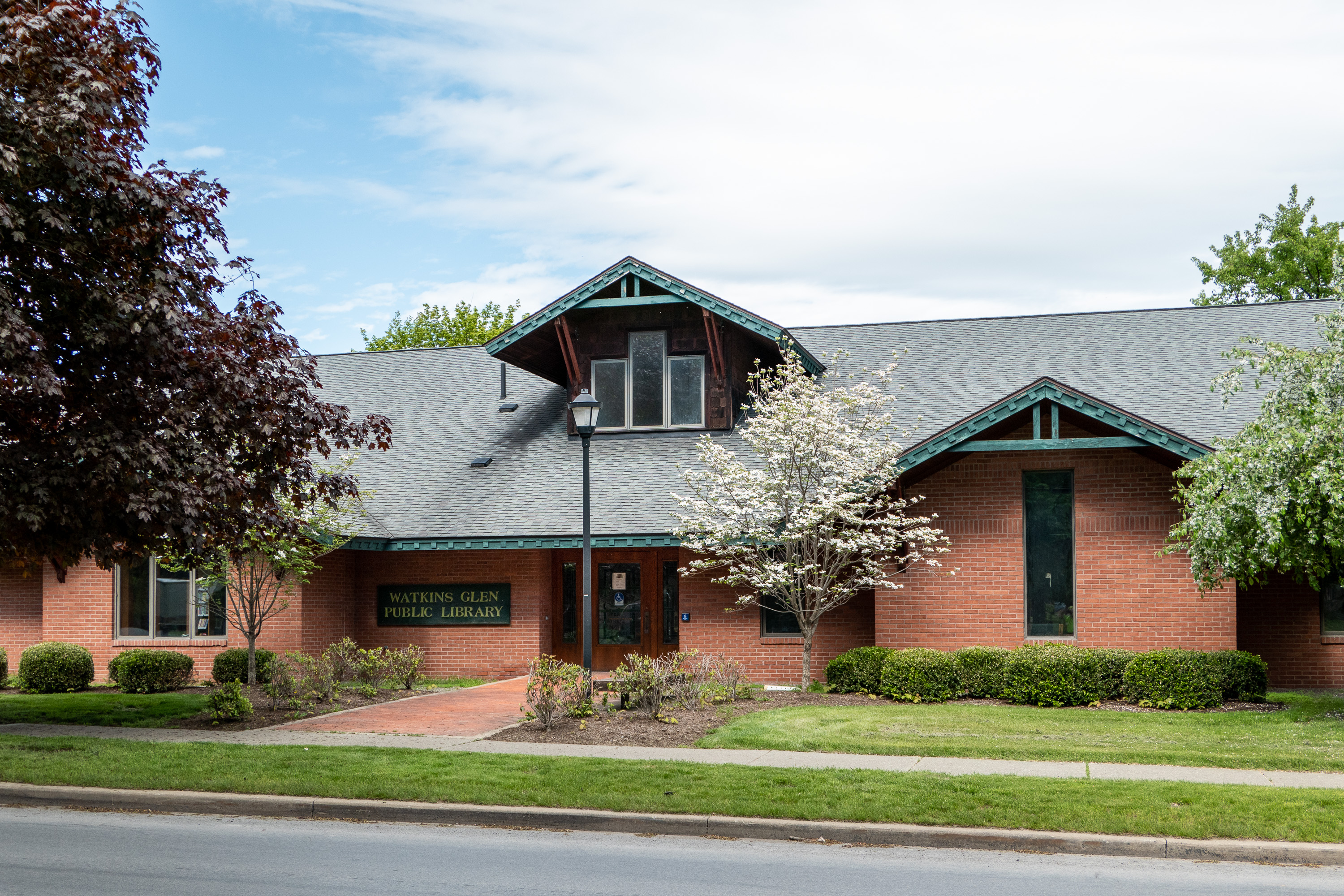
- The library in 2019
- Location: 610 South Decatur Street Watkins Glen, NY 14891
- Type: Public
- Established: 1870

Other information
- Director: Tracy Savard
- Website: https://watkinsglenlibrary.org/

The Watkins Glen Public Library is a public library located in Watkins Glen, New York. Founded in 1870 as the Ladies' Library, the library migrated between different transitional spaces during its early history. In 1896, it was formally chartered as a school district public library. In 1940, it found a formal home on the second floor of the Watkins Glen Municipal Building. In 1956, the library's charter was extended to correspond with the Watkins Glen Central School District. However, this location was not easily accessible and the library moved for a street-accessible building constructed in 1987, where it remains to this day.

The library is a member of the Southern Tier Library System.
