= Union Church of Pocantico Hills =

Historic church in New York, United States

- U.S. National Register of Historic Places
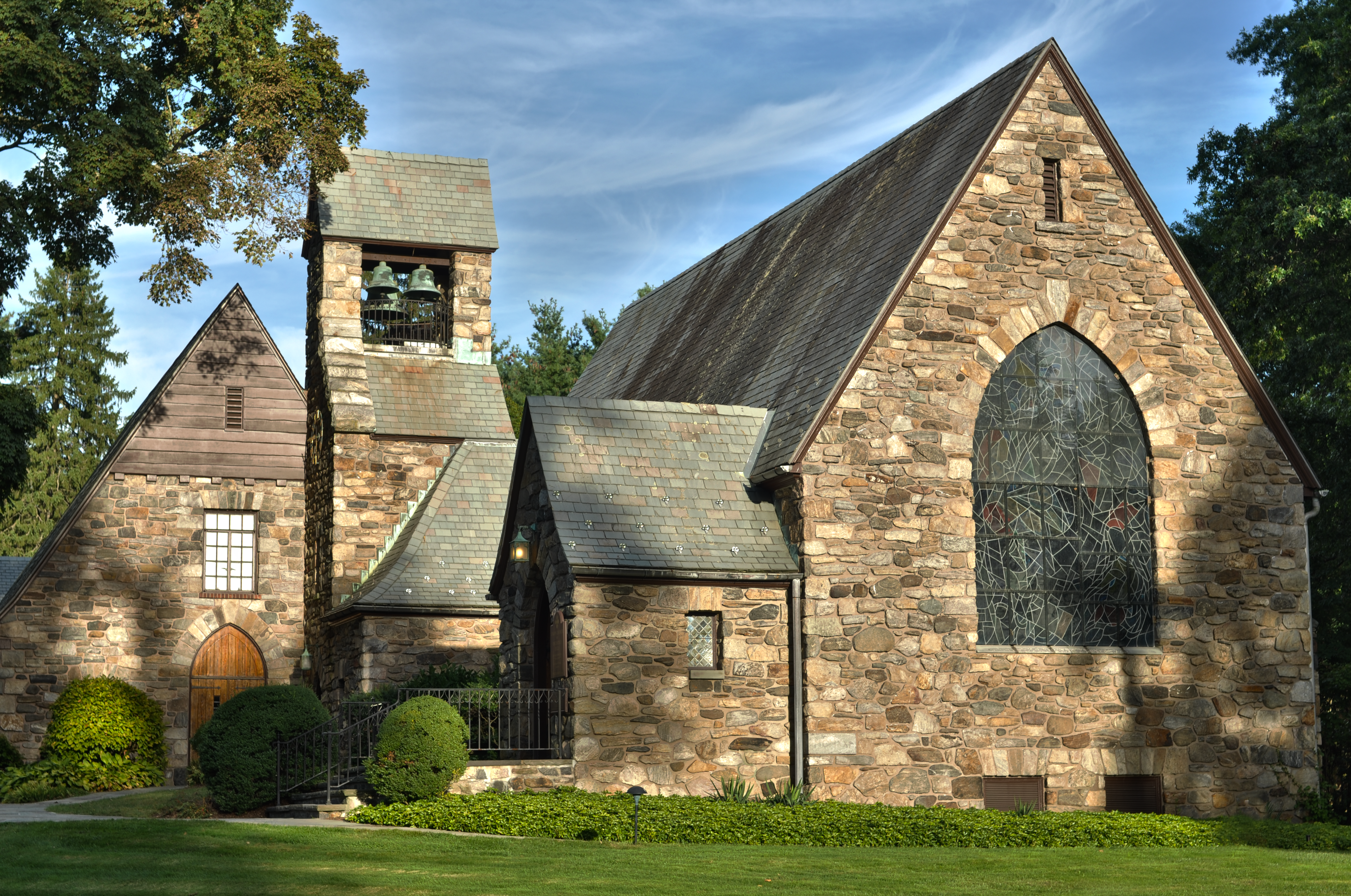
- Interactive map highlighting the church's location
- Location: 555-559 Bedford Rd., Pocantico Hills, New York
- Coordinates: 41°5′44″N 73°49′58″W
- Area: 1.2 acres (0.49 ha)
- Built: 1921
- Architect: Eisinger, Ludwig W.
- Architectural style: Late Gothic Revival
- NRHP reference No.: 02000447
- Added to NRHP: May 06, 2002

Union Church of Pocantico Hills is a historic, nondenominational church in Pocantico Hills, New York, listed on the National Register of Historic Places

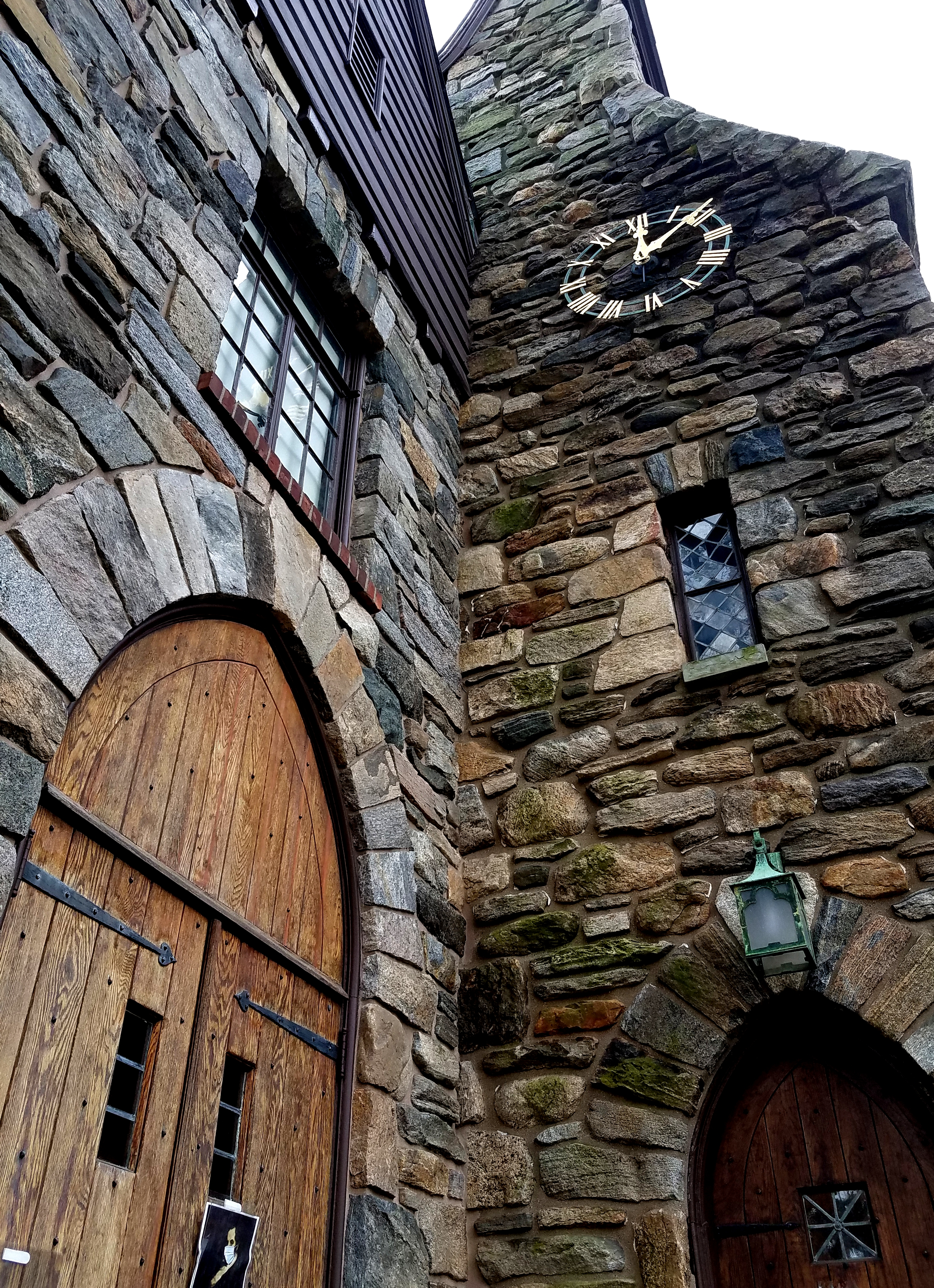
Fieldstone for the building, as well as timber for the interior, were harvested from the Rockefeller estate

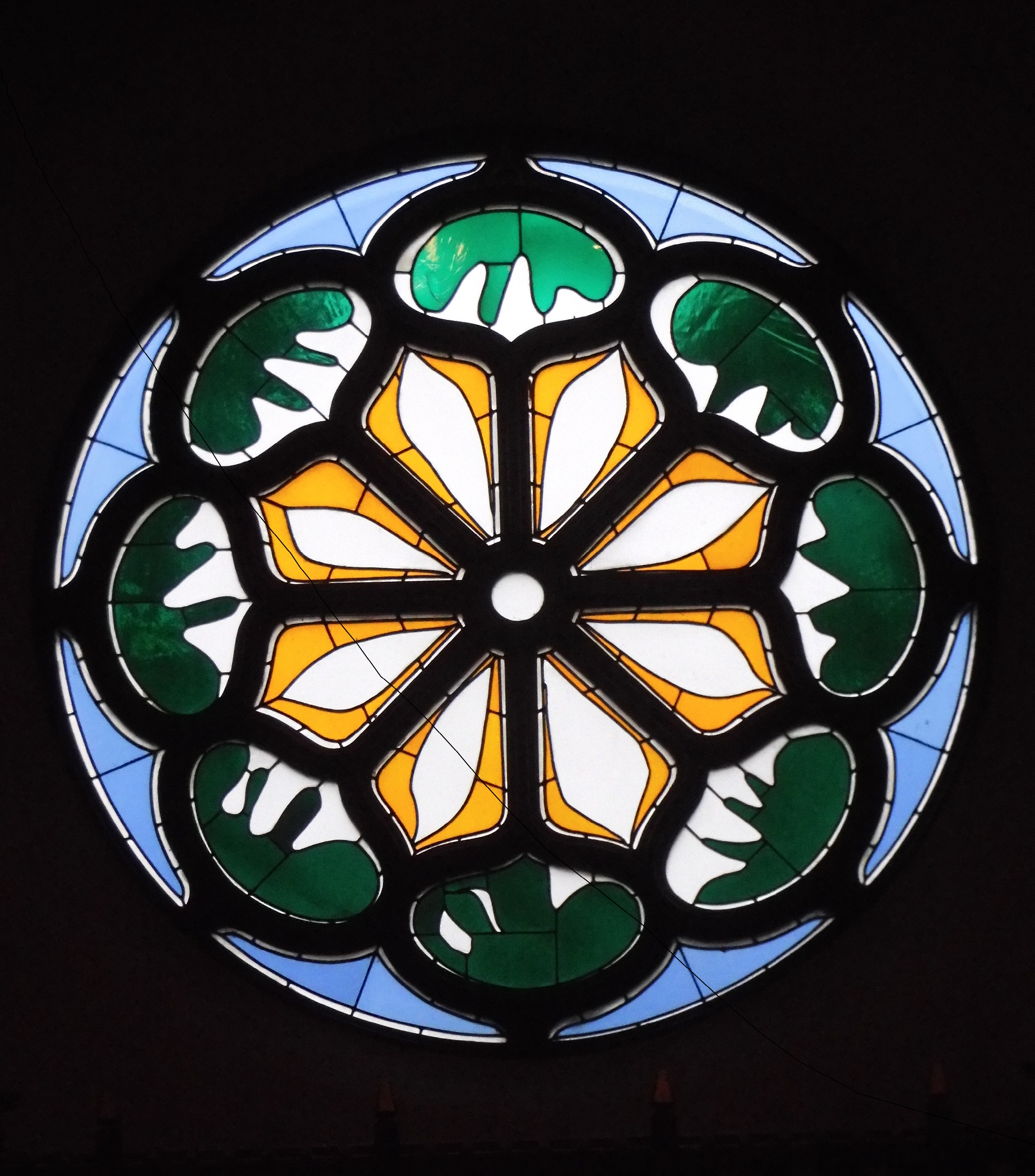
Henri Matisse rose window

Construction of the church was funded primarily by John D. Rockefeller Jr. in 1921, as part of his plans to develop the community of Pocantico Hills, which was below the Rockefeller family estate, Kykuit.

Upon the death of Rockefeller's wife Abby Aldrich Rockefeller in 1948, their son Nelson Rockefeller commissioned Henri Matisse to design the church's rose window in honor of her memory shortly before the artist's own death in 1954. When John D. Rockefeller Jr. died in 1960, his children commissioned artist Marc Chagall to design a Good Samaritan window in his honor. It is a one-story neo-Gothic style building with fieldstone foundation and walls and a slate covered, highly pitched gable roof. In 1930–1931, a parish hall was added to the east end of the church.

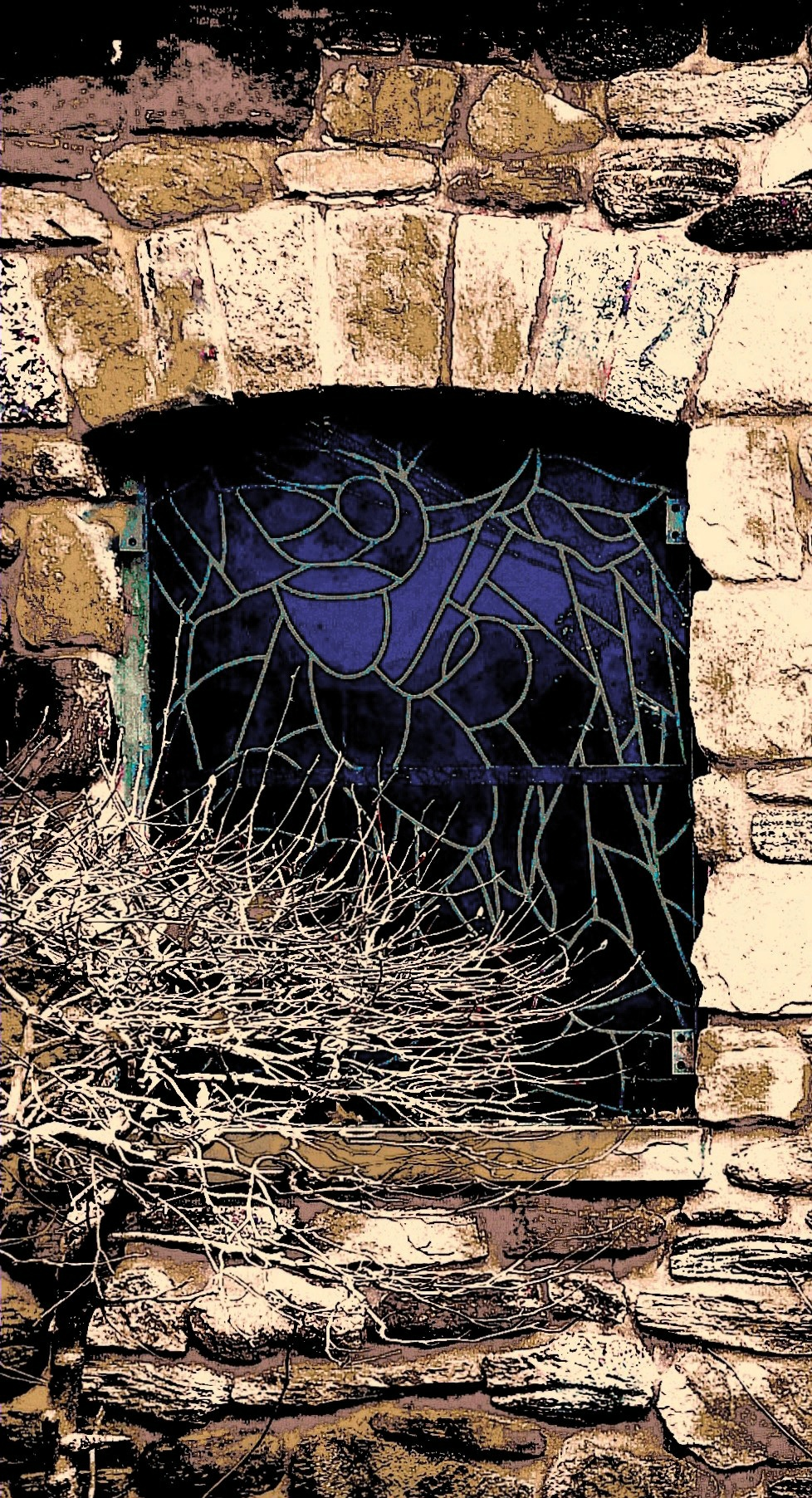
Outside view of one of Chagall windows

On May 6, 2006, the church was listed in the National Register of Historic Places.

== See also ==
- National Register of Historic Places listings in northern Westchester County, New York
