= 6 Hours of Watkins Glen =

Sports car endurance race held in Watkins Glen, New York

Six Hours of Watkins Glen

IMSA WeatherTech SportsCar Championship
- Venue: Watkins Glen International
- Corporate sponsor: Sahlen's
- First race: 1948
- First USCC race: 2014
- Duration: 6 Hours
- Previous names: Watkins Glen Grand Prix
- Most wins (driver): Walt Hansgen, Derek Bell, James Weaver, Scott Pruett, João Barbosa (4)
- Most wins (team): Briggs Cunningham (8)
- Most wins (manufacturer): Porsche (12)

The Six Hours of Watkins Glen (currently sponsored as the Sahlen's Six Hours of The Glen) is a sports car endurance race held annually at Watkins Glen International in Watkins Glen, New York. The race dates from 1948, and has been a part of the SCCA National Sports Car Championship, United States Road Racing Championship, World Sportscar Championship, IMSA GT Championship, Rolex Sports Car Series and currently the IMSA WeatherTech SportsCar Championship.

== History ==
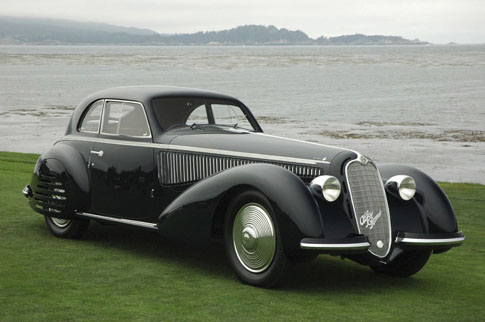
Frank Griswold won the first Watkins Glen Grand Prix in this 1938 Alfa Romeo 8C 2900B Touring Berlinetta

The first Watkins Glen Grand Prix was held in 1948 on a 6.6-mile course around Watkins Glen State Park and going through the village of Watkins Glen. Cameron Argetsinger, a Cornell law student and SCCA member, organized the event along with the local Chamber of Commerce. The 8-lap, 52.8-mile race was won by Frank Griswold in a pre-war Alfa Romeo 8C 2900B. In 1950, three spectators were injured during a support race, and driver Sam Collier was killed during the Grand Prix. The 1951 event became a part of the new SCCA National Sports Car Championship series. In 1952, twelve spectators were injured and one killed when a car left the circuit in the village. This led organizers to move the course to a hillside southwest of Watkins Glen for 1953. Drivers complained of poor visibility and run-off, prompting the construction of a permanent circuit, today called Watkins Glen International, in 1956.

In 1963, the race switched to the SCCA's new series, the United States Road Racing Championship. In 1968, the race was expanded to six hours, and joined the World Sportscar Championship. Along with the 24 Hours of Daytona and 12 Hours of Sebring, the Six Hours of Watkins Glen served as an American round of the WSC from 1968 until 1981, traditionally held during the summer. With the track's bankruptcy and the FIA's decision not to return the World Championship to the United States in 1982, the event was not held again until 1984. It returned as an event for the IMSA Camel GT Championship.

Under the control of IMSA, the event was radically altered and shortened. In the 1984 running, a break was held after three hours before the race began again and completed the next three hours. This event became known as the Camel Continental. A second event later in the year was also held lasting for just three hours or 500 kilometers, and was known as the New York 500. The Continental was modified once more in 1985, this time running sports prototypes in one three-hour event, and grand tourer cars in a second three-hour event. By 1986, the event was shortened altogether, and became a single 500 mile race, then shortened once more in 1987 to just 500 km.

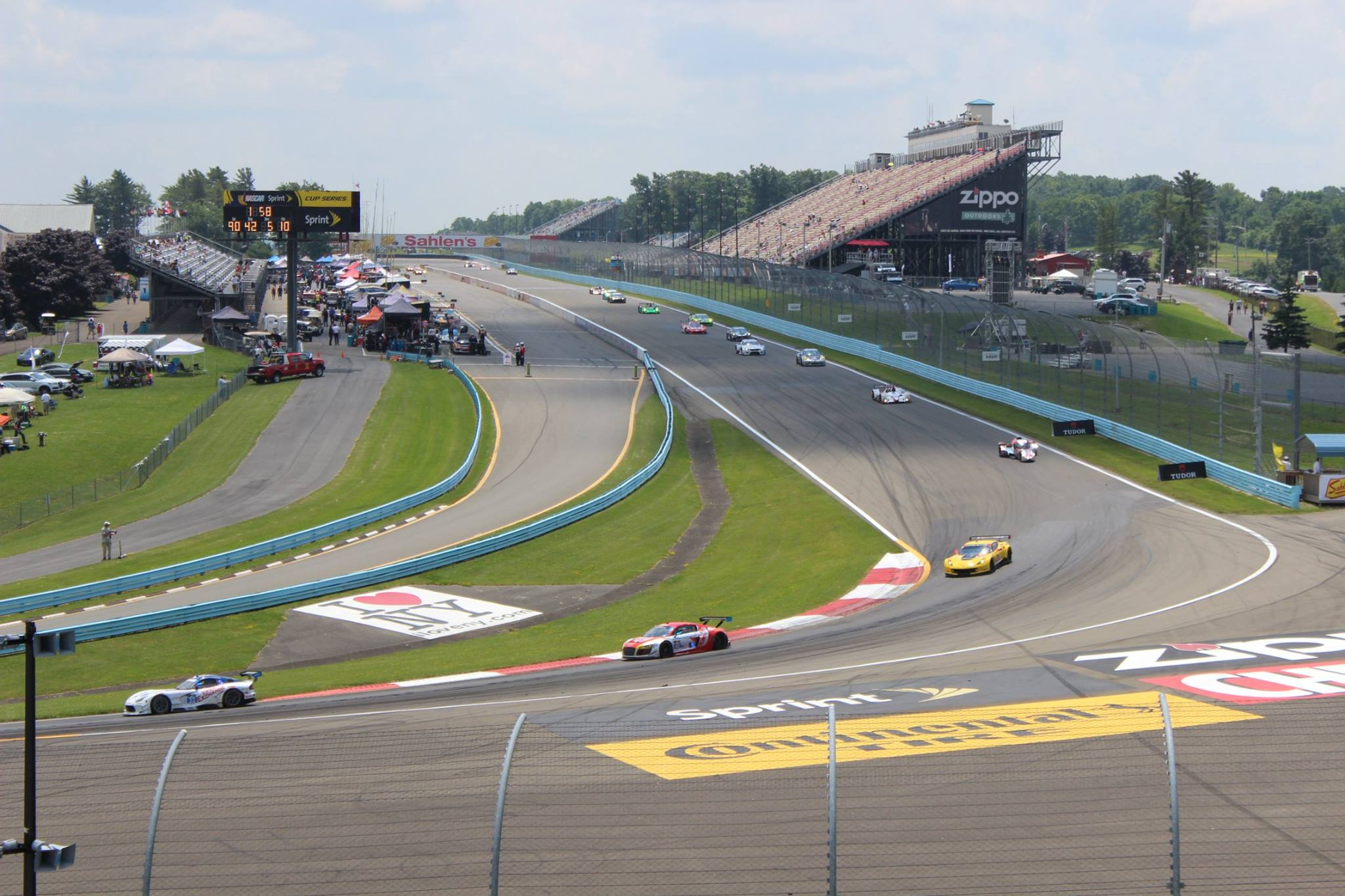
Cars dive into turn one during the 2014 event.

For several years IMSA kept the Continental as a 500 km race for prototypes in the summer, and the 500 km New York 500 for grand tourers in autumn. IMSA chose to drop the New York 500 in 1992, retaining the Continental as an event just for prototypes until 1995. In 1996, IMSA restored the Watkins Glen event to its historic format, combining prototypes and grand tourers once again.

By 1998, Watkins Glen chose to schedule the Six Hours as part of the new United States Road Racing Championship. This championship change was short lived, as the USSRC folded during the 1999 season prior to their second running at Watkins Glen, leaving an FIA GT Championship event as the year's sportscar headliner. In the wake of USRRC's collapse, the Grand American Road Racing Championship took control of the event, and retained the Six Hours since 2000 as part of the Rolex Sports Car Series. In 2014 after the merger of Grand-AM and the ALMS sports car series, IMSA regained control of the event under the United SportsCar Championship. The format of the race remains the same as it was under Grand-Am operation.

The COVID-19 pandemic caused the 2020 race to be moved to Road Atlanta, as New York state authorities would not allow NASCAR Holdings to host events.

== Race winners ==
=== First street course ===
Year	Drivers	Team	Car	Duration/Distance	Race title	Championship
1948	(United States) Frank Griswold	(United States) Frank Griswold	Alfa Romeo 8C 2900B	50 mi (80 km)	Grand Prix Watkins Glen	Non-championship
1949	(United States) Miles Collier	(United States) Collier Bros.	Riley-Mercury Special "Ardent Alligator"	100 mi (160 km)	Grand Prix Watkins Glen	Non-championship
1950	(United States) Erwin Goldschmidt	(United States) Alfred Goldschmidt	Allard J2-Cadillac	100 mi (160 km)	Sports Car Grand Prix of Watkins Glen	Non-championship
1951	(United States) Phil Walters	(United States) Briggs Cunningham	Cunningham C2R	100 mi (160 km)	Sports Car Grand Prix of Watkins Glen	SCCA National Sports Car Championship
1952	(United States) Briggs Cunningham	(United States) Briggs Cunningham	Cunningham C4R-Chrysler	100 mi (160 km)†	Sports Car Grand Prix of Watkins Glen	SCCA National Sports Car Championship

† Not completed; race stopped after fatal accident involving spectators

=== Second street course ===
Year	Drivers	Team	Car	Duration/Distance	Race title	Championship
1953	(United States) Walt Hansgen	(United States) Walt Hansgen	Jaguar XK120	100 mi (160 km)	Sports Car Grand Prix of Watkins Glen	Non-championship
1954	(United States) Phil Walters	(United States) Briggs Cunningham	Cunningham C4R-Chrysler	100 mi (160 km)	Sports Car Grand Prix of Watkins Glen	SCCA National Sports Car Championship
1955	(United States) Sherwood Johnston	(United States) Briggs Cunningham	Jaguar D-Type	100 mi (160 km)	Sports Car Grand Prix of Watkins Glen	SCCA National Sports Car Championship

=== Watkins Glen International ===
Year	Drivers	Team	Car	Duration/Distance	Race title	Championship
1956	(United States) George Constantine	(United States) Mary L. Constantine	Jaguar D-Type	50 mi (80 km)	Sports Car Grand Prix of Watkins Glen	SCCA National Sports Car Championship
1957	(United States) Walt Hansgen	(United States) Briggs Cunningham	Jaguar D-Type	100 mi (160 km)	Watkins Glen Grand Prix	SCCA National Sports Car Championship
1958	(United States) Ed Crawford	(United States) Briggs Cunningham	Lister-Jaguar	100 mi (160 km)	Grand Prix Watkins Glen	SCCA National Sports Car Championship
1959	(United States) Walt Hansgen	(United States) Briggs Cunningham	Lister-Costin Jaguar	100 mi (160 km)	Watkins Glen Grand Prix	SCCA National Sports Car Championship
1960	(United States) Augie Pabst	(United States) Meister Brauser	Scarab Mk II-Chevrolet	100 mi (160 km)	Watkins Glen Grand Prix	SCCA National Sports Car Championship
1961	(United States) George Constantine	(United States) John T. Bunch	Ferrari 250 TR 59	100 mi (160 km)	Grand Prix at Watkins Glen	SCCA National Sports Car Championship
1962	(United States) Walt Hansgen	(United States) Briggs Cunningham	Cooper Monaco T61-Buick	100 mi (160 km)	Grand Prix at Watkins Glen	SCCA National Sports Car Championship
1963	(United States) Bob Holbert		Porsche 718 RS61	300 km (190 mi)	Watkins Glen Sports Car Grand Prix	United States Road Racing Championship
1964	(United States) Jim Hall	(United States) Chaparral Cars	Chaparral 2A-Chevrolet	200 mi (320 km)	Watkins Glen Sports Car Grand Prix	United States Road Racing Championship
1965	(United States) Jim Hall	(United States) Chaparral Cars	Chaparral 2A-Chevrolet	200 mi (320 km)	Watkins Glen Sports Car Grand Prix	United States Road Racing Championship
1966	(United States) John Fulp		Lola T70 Mk.2-Chevrolet	200 mi (320 km)	Watkins Glen Sports Car Grand Prix	United States Road Racing Championship
1967	(United States) Mark Donohue	(United States) Roger Penske	Lola T70 Mk.3-Chevrolet	200 mi (320 km)	Sports Car Grand Prix at Watkins Glen	United States Road Racing Championship
1968	(United States) Mark Donohue	(United States) Roger Penske	McLaren M6A-Chevrolet	200 mi (320 km)	Watkins Glen Sports Car Road Race	United States Road Racing Championship
1968	(Belgium) Jacky Ickx (Belgium) Lucien Bianchi	(United Kingdom) J.W. Automotive Engineering	Ford GT40	six hours 1,058.626 km (657.800 mi)	Watkins Glen Sports Car Road Race	World Sportscar Championship
1969	(Switzerland) Jo Siffert (United Kingdom) Brian Redman	Porsche of Austria	Porsche 908/02	six hours 1,077.134 km (669.300 mi)	Watkins Glen Six Hours	World Sportscar Championship
1970	(Mexico) Pedro Rodríguez (Finland) Leo Kinnunen	(United Kingdom) J.W. Automotive Engineering	Porsche 917K	six hours 1,140.059 km (708.400 mi)	6 Hours of the Glen	World Sportscar Championship
1971	(Italy) Andrea de Adamich (Sweden) Ronnie Peterson	(Italy) Autodelta SpA	Alfa Romeo T33/3	six hours 1,090.189 km (677.412 mi)	6 Hours of the Glen	World Sportscar Championship
1972	(United States) Mario Andretti (Belgium) Jacky Ickx	(Italy) SpA Ferrari SEFAC	Ferrari 312 PB	six hours 1,059.777 km (658.515 mi)	6 Hours of the Glen	World Sportscar Championship
1973	(France) Gérard Larrousse (France) Henri Pescarolo	(France) Équipe Matra-Simca	Matra-Simca MS670B	six hours 1,081.516 km (672.023 mi)	6 Hours of the Glen	World Sportscar Championship
1974	(France) Jean-Pierre Jarier (France) Jean-Pierre Beltoise	(France) Équipe Gitanes	Matra-Simca MS670C	six hours 1,048.906 km (651.760 mi)	6 Hours of the Glen	World Sportscar Championship
1975	(United Kingdom) Derek Bell (France) Henri Pescarolo	(West Germany) Willi Kauhsen Racing Team	Alfa Romeo 33TT12	six hours 826.083 km (513.304 mi)	6 Hours of the Glen	World Sportscar Championship
1976	(West Germany) Rolf Stommelen (Liechtenstein) Manfred Schurti	(West Germany) Martini Racing Porsche System	Porsche 935	six hours 945.647 km (587.598 mi)	6 Hours of the Glen	World Sportscar Championship
1977	(West Germany) Jochen Mass (Belgium) Jacky Ickx	(West Germany) Martini Racing Porsche System	Porsche 935/77	six hours 940.213 km (584.221 mi)	6 Hours of the Glen	World Sportscar Championship
1978	(Netherlands) Toine Hezemans (United Kingdom) John Fitzpatrick (United States) Peter Gregg	(West Germany) GeLo Racing Team	Porsche 935/77	six hours 793.474 km (493.042 mi)	World Championship 6-Hours	World Sportscar Championship
1979	(United States) Don Whittington (West Germany) Klaus Ludwig (United States) Bill Whittington	(United States) Whittington Brothers (West Germany) Kremer Racing	Porsche 935 K3	six hours 951.082 km (590.975 mi)	World Championship 6-Hours	World Sportscar Championship
1980	(West Germany) Hans Heyer (Italy) Riccardo Patrese	(Italy) Lancia Corse	Lancia Beta Montecarlo Turbo	six hours 755.431 km (469.403 mi)	World Championship 6-Hours	World Sportscar Championship
1981	(Italy) Riccardo Patrese (Italy) Michele Alboreto	(Italy) Martini Racing	Lancia Beta Montecarlo Turbo	six hours 940.213 km (584.221 mi)	Glen Six Hours of Endurance	World Sportscar Championship
1982–1983	Not held following track bankruptcy and the end of the United States Grand Prix being held at the circuit in 1980					
1984	(United States) Al Holbert (United Kingdom) Derek Bell (United States) Jim Adams	(United States) Holbert Racing	Porsche 962	six hours 1,054.342 km (655.138 mi)	Camel Continental	IMSA GT Championship
1985	(United States) Al Holbert (United Kingdom) Derek Bell	(United States) Holbert Racing	Porsche 962	three hours	Camel Continental	IMSA GT Championship
1986	(United States) Al Holbert (United Kingdom) Derek Bell	(United States) Holbert Racing	Porsche 962	500 mi (800 km)	Camel Continental	IMSA GT Championship
1987	(United States) Price Cobb (Australia) Vern Schuppan	(United States) Dyson Racing	Porsche 962	500 km (310 mi)	Camel Continental	IMSA GT Championship
1988	(Australia) Geoff Brabham (United States) John Morton	(United States) Electramotive Engineering	Nissan GTP ZX-Turbo	500 km (310 mi)	Camel Continental	IMSA GT Championship
1989	(Australia) Geoff Brabham (United States) Chip Robinson	(United States) Electramotive Engineering	Nissan GTP ZX-Turbo	500 km (310 mi)	Camel Continental	IMSA GT Championship
1990	(United States) Chip Robinson (United States) Bob Earl	(United States) Nissan Performance Technology	Nissan NPT-90	500 km (310 mi)	Camel Continental	IMSA GT Championship
1991	(Argentina) Juan Manuel Fangio II	(United States) All American Racers	Eagle HF90-Toyota	500 km (310 mi)	Camel Continental	IMSA GT Championship
1992	(Argentina) Juan Manuel Fangio II	(United States) All American Racers	Eagle MkIII-Toyota	two hours, forty-five minutes	Camel Continental	IMSA GT Championship
1993	(Argentina) Juan Manuel Fangio II	(United States) All American Racers	Eagle MkIII-Toyota	500 km (310 mi)	Camel Continental	IMSA GT Championship
1994	(Italy) Giampiero Moretti (Chile) Eliseo Salazar	(Italy) MOMO	Ferrari 333 SP	three hours	Glen Continental	IMSA GT Championship
1995	(United States) Butch Leitzinger (United Kingdom) James Weaver	(United States) Dyson Racing	Riley & Scott Mk III-Ford	three hours	Glen Continental	IMSA GT Championship
1996	(Italy) Giampiero Moretti (Italy) Max Papis	(Italy) MOMO	Ferrari 333 SP	six hours 973.975 km (605.200 mi)	First Union 6 Hours of the Glen	IMSA GT Championship
1997	(United States) Butch Leitzinger (United Kingdom) James Weaver (United States) Elliott Forbes-Robinson	(United States) Dyson Racing	Riley & Scott Mk III-Ford	six hours 924.980 km (574.756 mi)	First Union 6 Hours of the Glen	IMSA GT Championship
1998	(Italy) Giampiero Moretti (Italy) Mauro Baldi (Belgium) Didier Theys	(United States) MOMO/Doran Racing	Ferrari 333 SP	six hours 949.392 km (589.925 mi)	First Union 6 Hours of the Glen	United States Road Racing Championship
1999	(France) Jean-Philippe Belloc (United States) David Donohue	(France) Viper Team Oreca	Chrysler Viper GTS-R	three hours	Bosch Sports Car Oktoberfest	FIA GT Championship
2000	(United Kingdom) James Weaver (United Kingdom) Andy Wallace (United States) Butch Leitzinger	(United States) Dyson Racing	Riley & Scott Mk III-Ford	six hours 931.632 km (578.889 mi)	Bosch Sports Car Summerfest	Grand American Road Racing Championship
2001	(Belgium) Didier Theys (Italy) Mauro Baldi (Switzerland) Fredy Lienhard	(United States) Doran Racing	Ferrari 333 SP-Judd	six hours 988.256 km (614.074 mi)	Sports Car Grand Prix at the Glen	Grand American Road Racing Championship
2002	(United Kingdom) James Weaver (United States) Chris Dyson	(United States) Dyson Racing	Riley & Scott Mk III-Ford	six hours 1,038.224 km (645.122 mi)	Six Hours of the Glen	Grand-Am Rolex Sports Car Series
2003	(United States) David Donohue (United States) Mike Borkowski (Canada) Scott Goodyear	(United States) Brumos Porsche	Fabcar FDSC/03-Porsche	six hours 927.184 km (576.125 mi)	Sahlen's Six Hours of the Glen	Grand-Am Rolex Sports Car Series
2004	(Italy) Max Papis (United States) Scott Pruett	(United States) Chip Ganassi Racing	Riley MkXI-Lexus	six hours 910.528 km (565.776 mi)	Sahlen's Six Hours of the Glen	Grand-Am Rolex Sports Car Series
2005	(United States) Tracy Krohn (Sweden) Niclas Jönsson	(United States) Krohn Racing	Riley MkXI-Pontiac	six hours 832.800 km (517.478 mi)	Sahlen's Six Hours of the Glen	Grand-Am Rolex Sports Car Series
2006	(Germany) Jörg Bergmeister (United States) Boris Said	(United States) Krohn Racing	Riley MkXI-Ford	Six hours 855.008 km (531.277 mi)	Sahlen's Six Hours of the Glen	Grand-Am Rolex Sports Car Series
2007	(United States) Alex Gurney (United States) Jon Fogarty	(United States) Bob Stallings Racing	Riley MkXI-Pontiac	six hours 927.184 km (576.125 mi)	Sahlen's Six Hours of the Glen	Grand-Am Rolex Sports Car Series
2008	(United States) Scott Pruett (Mexico) Memo Rojas	(United States) Chip Ganassi Racing	Riley MkXX-Lexus	six hours 993.808 km (617.524 mi)	Sahlen's Six Hours of the Glen	Grand-Am Rolex Sports Car Series
2009	(United States) Scott Pruett (Mexico) Memo Rojas	(United States) Chip Ganassi Racing	Riley MkXX-Lexus	six hours 1,020.840 km (634.321 mi)	Sahlen's Six Hours of the Glen	Grand-Am Rolex Sports Car Series
2010	(United States) Scott Pruett (Mexico) Memo Rojas	(United States) Chip Ganassi Racing with Felix Sabates	Riley MkXX-BMW	six hours 1,037.130 km (644.443 mi)	Sahlen's Six Hours of the Glen	Grand-Am Rolex Sports Car Series
2011	(Italy) Max Angelelli (United States) Ricky Taylor	(United States) SunTrust Racing	Dallara DP08-Chevrolet	six hours 944.820 km (587.084 mi)	Sahlen's Six Hours of the Glen	Grand-Am Rolex Sports Car Series
2012	(Portugal) João Barbosa (United States) Darren Law	(United States) Action Express Racing	Chevrolet Corvette DP (Coyote CPM-Chevrolet)	six hours 995.656 km (618.672 mi)	Sahlen's Six Hours of the Glen	Grand-Am Rolex Sports Car Series
2013	(Portugal) João Barbosa (Brazil) Christian Fittipaldi	(United States) Action Express Racing	Chevrolet Corvette DP (Coyote CPM-Chevrolet)	six hours 935.712 km (581.424 mi)	Sahlen's Six Hours of The Glen	Grand-Am Rolex Sports Car Series
2014	(United Kingdom) Richard Westbrook (Canada) Michael Valiante	(United States) Spirit of Daytona Racing	Chevrolet Corvette DP (Coyote CPM-Chevrolet)	six hours 1,045.152 km (649.427 mi)	Sahlen's Six Hours of The Glen	Tudor United SportsCar Championship
2015	(United Kingdom) Richard Westbrook (Canada) Michael Valiante	(United States) VisitFlorida.com Racing	Chevrolet Corvette DP (Coyote CPM-Chevrolet)	six hours 875.52 km (544.02 mi)	Sahlen's Six Hours of The Glen	Tudor United SportsCar Championship
2016	(Portugal) Filipe Albuquerque (Portugal) João Barbosa (Brazil) Christian Fittipaldi	(United States) Action Express Racing	Chevrolet Corvette DP (Coyote CPM-Chevrolet)	six hours 1,077.9 km (669.8 mi)	Sahlen's Six Hours of the Glen	WeatherTech SportsCar Championship
2017	(Portugal) João Barbosa (Brazil) Christian Fittipaldi (Portugal) Filipe Albuquerque	(United States) Mustang Sampling Racing	Cadillac DPi-V.R	six hours 1,090 km (680 mi)	Sahlen's Six Hours of the Glen	WeatherTech SportsCar Championship
2018	(Canada) Misha Goikhberg (South Africa) Stephen Simpson (United States) Chris Miller	(United States) JDC-Miller Motorsports	Oreca 07-Gibson	six hours 1,105.3 km (686.8 mi)	Sahlen's Six Hours of the Glen	WeatherTech SportsCar Championship
2019	(United States) Jonathan Bomarito (France) Olivier Pla (United Kingdom) Harry Tincknell	(Germany) Mazda Team Joest	Mazda RT24-P	six hours 1,154.5 km (717.4 mi)^{1}	Sahlen's Six Hours of the Glen	WeatherTech SportsCar Championship
2020	Moved to Road Atlanta due to COVID-19 pandemic					
2021	(United States) Jonathan Bomarito (United Kingdom) Oliver Jarvis (United Kingdom) Harry Tincknell	(Canada) Mazda Motorsports	Mazda RT24-P	six hours 1,090 km (680 mi)	Sahlen's Six Hours of the Glen	WeatherTech SportsCar Championship
2022	(Portugal) Filipe Albuquerque (United States) Ricky Taylor	(United States) Wayne Taylor Racing	Acura ARX-05	six hours 900 km (559 mi)	Sahlen's Six Hours of the Glen	WeatherTech SportsCar Championship
2023	(United Kingdom) Nick Yelloly (United States) Connor De Phillippi	(United States) BMW M Team RLL	BMW M Hybrid V8	six hours 1,115 km (693 mi)	Sahlen's Six Hours of the Glen	WeatherTech SportsCar Championship
2024	(United States) Dane Cameron (Brazil) Felipe Nasr	(Germany) Porsche Team Penske	Porsche 963	six hours 822 km (511 mi)	Sahlen's Six Hours of the Glen	WeatherTech SportsCar Championship
2025	(United Kingdom) Tom Blomqvist (United States) Colin Braun	(United States) Acura Meyer Shank Racing	Acura ARX-06	six hours 924 km (574 mi)	Sahlen's Six Hours of the Glen	WeatherTech SportsCar Championship
2026	(United Kingdom) Jack Aitken (New Zealand) Earl Bamber (Denmark) Frederik Vesti	(United States) Cadillac Whelen	Cadillac V-Series.R	six hours 996 km (619 mi)	Sahlen's Six Hours of the Glen	WeatherTech SportsCar Championship

Notes

^1 Race record for distance covered.
