= Cameron Argetsinger =

American sports car enthusiast (1921–2008)

- Born: March 1, 1921; Youngstown, Ohio
- Died: April 22, 2008 (aged 87); Watkins Glen, New York
- Occupations: Lawyer, Auto racing executive
- Spouse: Jean Argetsinger

Cameron Argetsinger (March 1, 1921 – April 22, 2008) was an American sports car enthusiast, lawyer and auto racing executive best known for creating the Watkins Glen Grand Prix Race Course in Watkins Glen, New York, and making it the home of the Formula One United States Grand Prix from 1961 through 1980.

== Biography ==
=== Early life ===
Argetsinger grew up in Youngstown, where his father, James Cameron Argetsinger, was general counsel and secretary of the Youngstown Sheet and Tube Company. He spent the summers of his boyhood in Schuyler County, New York visiting his grandparents and, later, his family's summer home. He inherited a love of fast cars from his father and in 1947 bought a sports car so he could become a member of the nascent Sports Car Club of America.

=== Watkins Glen Sports Car Grand Prix ===
Before long, Argetsinger began to dream of organizing a sports car race in and around the town of Watkins Glen. "It's been said, and it's not entirely wrong, that I did it because I had an MG-TC and didn't have a place to race it," he told The New York Times in 1998. From 1948 through 1952, the Watkins Glen Sports Car Grand Prix was held on a circuit that followed public roads through the village and around the nearby gorge. While the event was hugely popular, the deaths of drivers and spectators in crashes forced it to move off the New York State public roads after four years. The Grand Prix ran on two different layouts on county roads until the present location was bought and the track built.

=== Home of the United States Grand Prix ===
In 1953, Argetsinger was named executive director of the new Watkins Glen Grand Prix Corporation. Three years later, the group purchased 550 acres (2.2 km^{2}) of land and built a 2.3-mile permanent racing facility, designed to imitate the winding country roads on which the race had originated. Soon the circuit was attracting some of the world's best road racers, including Stirling Moss, Jo Bonnier, Phil Hill and Dan Gurney, for the Formula Libre races, which ran from 1958 through 1960. These events set the stage for Argetsinger's bid to host the ultimate American road racing event: the Formula One United States Grand Prix. His timing was perfect: the United States Grand Prix saw disappointing crowds at in its first two runnings at Sebring, Florida, and Riverside, California. The race found a home in upstate New York in 1961, and Watkins Glen became the focal point of American road racing for the next two decades.

In 1969, Argetsinger attempted to purchase the raceway in order to improve its financial operations. When the Grand Prix Corporation refused to sell, he resigned as executive director and moved to Midland, Texas, where he went to work for Chaparral Cars.

=== Auto racing executive ===
Argetsinger moved to Denver in 1972 to become the Director of Professional Racing and then executive director of the Sports Car Club of America. In 1977, he returned to his law practice in Schuyler County, New York. He became president of the International Motor Racing Research Center in Watkins Glen in 2002.

== Career Award ==
Argetsinger was a member of the inaugural induction class of the Sports Car Club of America Hall of Fame in 2005.

In 2005, Watkins Glen International renamed its trophy for the Indy Racing League race champion the "Cameron R. Argetsinger Trophy". Each year, the winner receives a sterling-silver replica and their name is added to the nameplate at the base of the sterling-silver cup.

== Notes ==
First recipient of SCCA Woolf Barnato Trophy (1948) Recipient of Bob Akin Memorial Award (2007) from the Road Racing Driver's Club (RRDC)

== See also ==
- Formula Libre
- Formula One
- Sports Car Club of America
- United States Grand Prix
- Watkins Glen Grand Prix
- Watkins Glen International
- Watkins Glen, New York
