= Watkins Glen High School =

- U.S. National Register of Historic Places
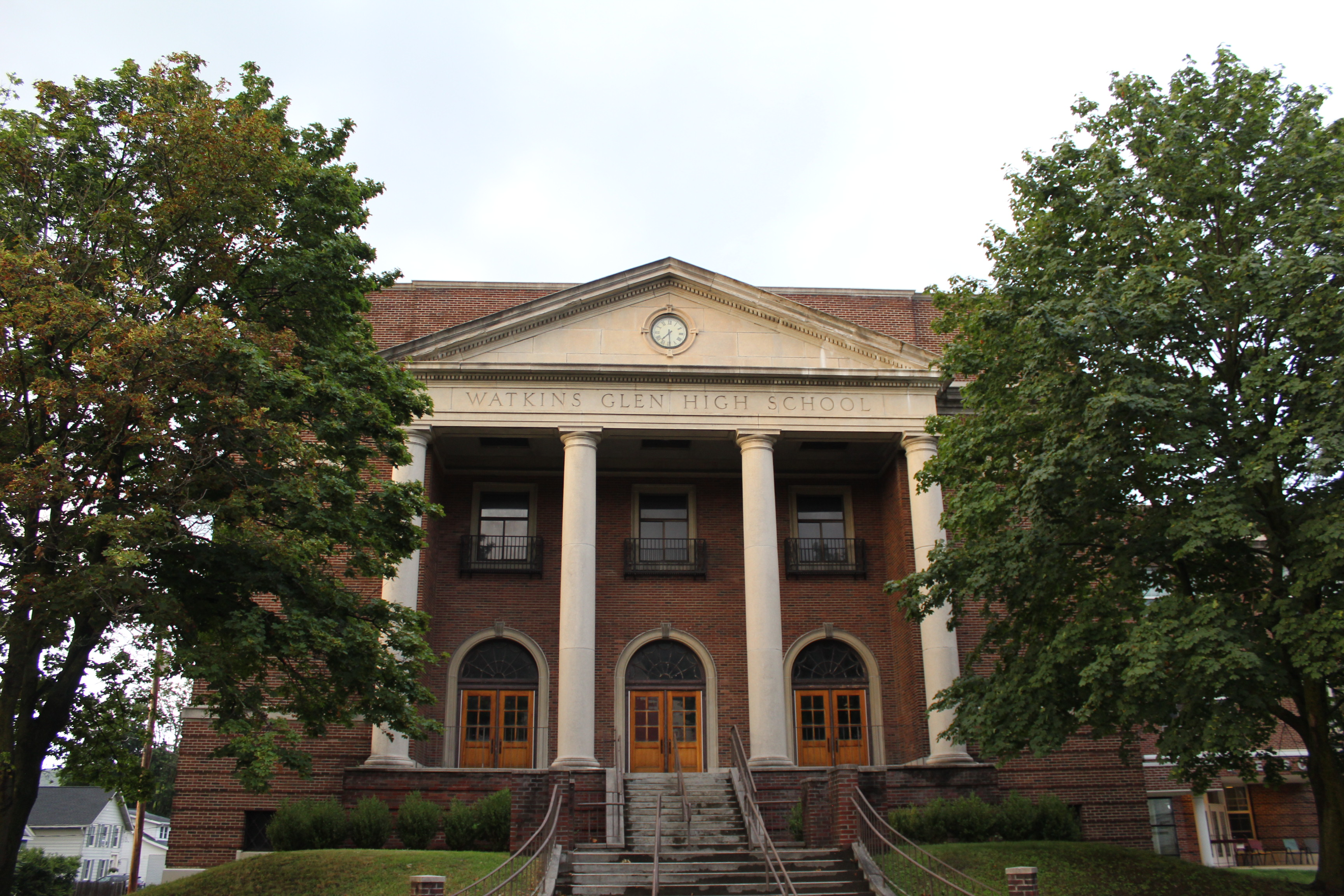

- Location within New York Location within the United States
- Location: 900 N. Decatur St., Watkins Glen, New York
- Coordinates: 42.377528°N 76.868981°W
- Area: 2.77 acres (1.12 ha)
- Built: 1929, 1958
- Built by: Rankin Construction Company
- Architect: Ade, Carl
- Architectural style: Classical Revival
- NRHP reference No.: 15000008
- Added to NRHP: February 12, 2015

Watkins Glen High School, also known as Watkins Glen Middle School, is a historic high school building located at Watkins Glen in Schuyler County, New York. It was built in 1929, and is a three-story, Classical Revival style brick school. It has an "H"-plan and features a broad pedimented portico with full height Doric order columns. A two-story addition was built in 1958. It was used as a high school until 1969, after which it housed a middle school. The school was closed in 2013, and was developed into senior housing, using the gymnasium and auditorium as community space.

It was listed on the National Register of Historic Places in 2015.
