= Watkins Glen, New York =

Village and CDP in New York, US

- Village
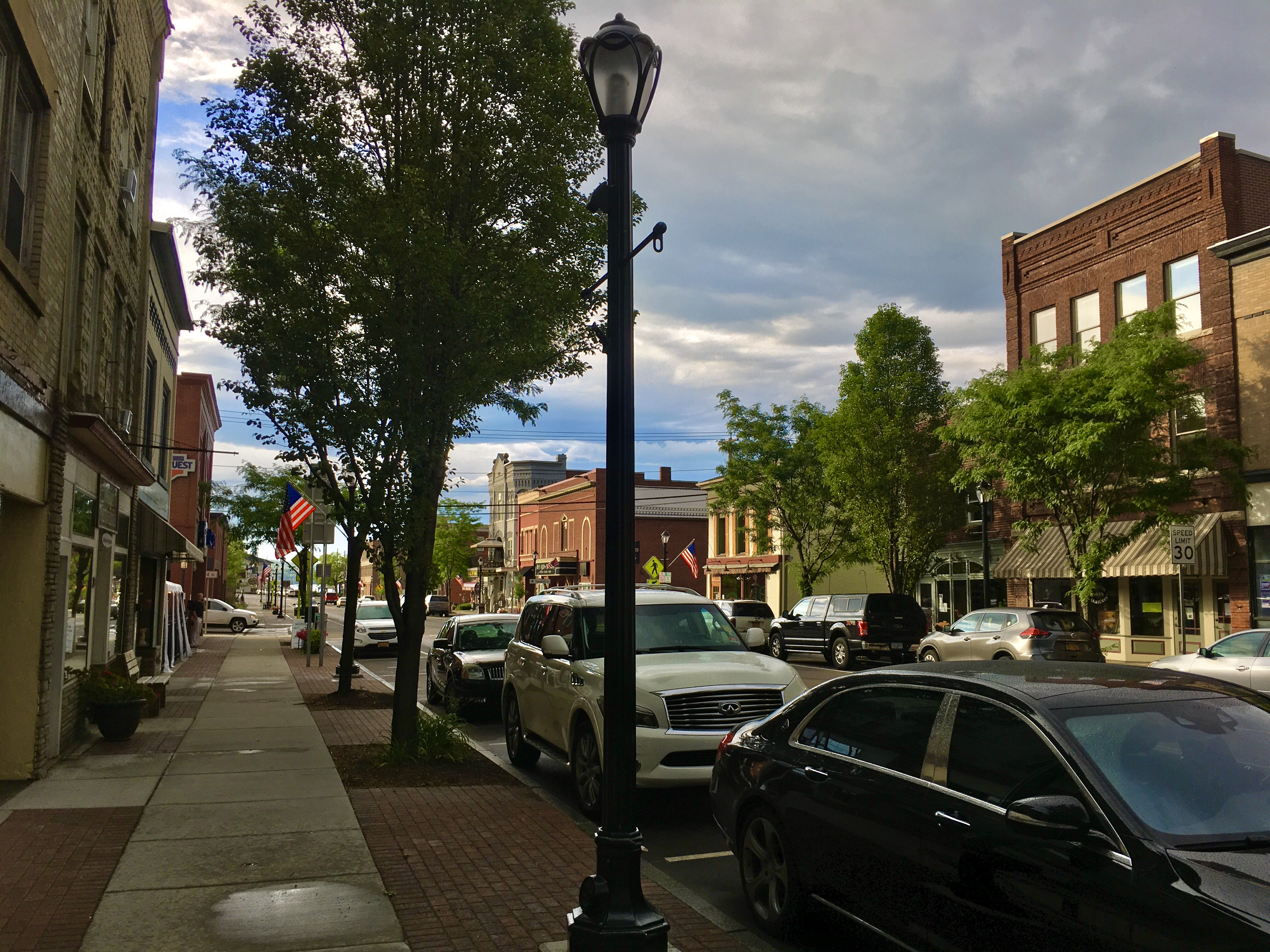
- Franklin Street in Watkins Glen, New York

- Location within the state of New York Watkins Glen (the United States)
- Coordinates: 42°22′52″N 76°52′16″W
- Country: United States
- State: New York
- County: Schuyler
- Settled: 1791; 235 years ago
- Named: 1842; 184 years ago as Jefferson
- Named: 1852; 174 years ago as Watkins Glen

Government
  - Mayor: Laurie DeNardo

Area
  - Total: 1.94 sq mi (5.03 km^{2})
  - Land: 1.56 sq mi (4.04 km^{2})
  - Water: 0.38 sq mi (0.99 km^{2})
- Elevation: 463 ft (141 m)

Population (2020)
  - Total: 1,863
  - Density: 1,194.1/sq mi (461.05/km^{2})
- Time zone: UTC-5 (Eastern (EST))
  - Summer (DST): UTC-4 (EDT)
- ZIP code: 14891
- Area code: 607
- FIPS code: 36-78696
- GNIS feature ID: 0974082
- Website: www.watkinsglen.us

Watkins Glen is a village in and the county seat of Schuyler County, New York, United States. As of the 2020 census, the population was 1,829. Watkins Glen lies between the towns of Dix and Reading. To the southwest of the village is the Watkins Glen International race track, which hosts annual NASCAR Cup Series and WeatherTech SportsCar Championship races, and formerly hosted the United States Grand Prix and various IndyCar races.

== History ==
The settlement of the village began in 1791. First named "Jefferson" in 1842, the village was later renamed in 1852 to honor Dr. Samuel Watkins. Watkins' older brother John purchased property around the gorge in 1794 and constructed mills. After his brother's death, Samuel Watkins inherited the property and spent four decades building up the area with roads, shops, and a hotel. The newspaper Watkins Glen Review & Express has served the area since 1854.

== Geography ==
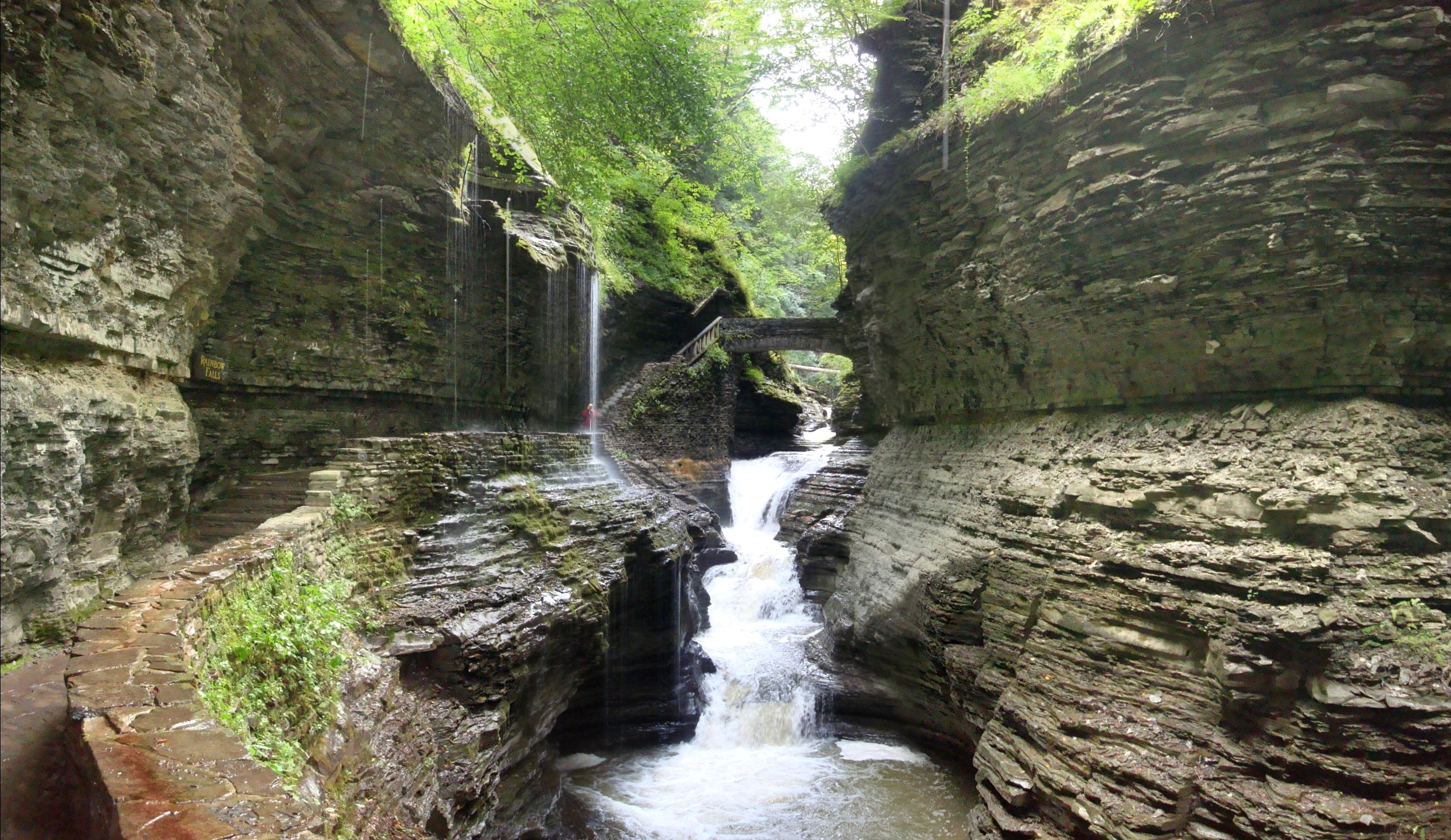
Watkins Glen State Park

Watkins Glen is located at 42°22′52″N 76°52′16″W (42.380984, -76.871079).

According to the United States Census Bureau, the village has a total area of 2.2 square miles (5.7 km^{2}), of which 1.9 square miles (4.9 km^{2}) of the village is land and 0.4 square miles (1.0 km^{2}) (17.41%) is water.

New York State Route 14 joins New York State Route 79 and New York State Route 414 by Watkins Glen. NY-14 is one of the principal streets in Watkins Glen. New York State Route 329 and New York State Route 409 lead into Watkins Glen from the west.

== Demographics ==
Historical population
Census	Pop.	Note	%±
1870	2,039		—
1880	2,716		33.2%
1890	2,604		−4.1%
1900	2,943		13.0%
1910	2,817		−4.3%
1920	2,785		−1.1%
1930	2,956		6.1%
1940	2,913		−1.5%
1950	3,052		4.8%
1960	2,813		−7.8%
1970	2,716		−3.4%
1980	2,440		−10.2%
1990	2,207		−9.5%
2000	2,149		−2.6%
2010	1,859		−13.5%
2020	1,829		−1.6%
2024 (est.)	1,746	▼	−4.5%
U.S. Decennial Census

As of the census of 2010, there were 1,859 people, 873 households, and 442 families residing in the village. The population density was 845 inhabitants per square mile (326/km^{2}). There were 977 housing units at an average density of 444 per square mile (171/km^{2}). The racial makeup of the village was 96.2% White, 0.50% African American, 0.40% Native American, 0.50% Asian, 0.70% from other races, and 1.70% from two or more races. Hispanic or Latino of any race were 1.40% of the population.

There were 873 households, out of which 22.60% had children under the age of 18 living with them, 33.70% were married couples living together, 12.7% had a female householder with no husband present, and 49.40% were non-families. 42.40% of all households were made up of individuals. The average household size was 2.09 and the average family size was 2.86.

In the village, the age distribution of the population was spread out, with 22.70% under the age of 20, 5.40% from 20 to 24, 31.80% from 25 to 50, and 17.50% who were 65 years of age or older. The median age was 43.20 years old. The Village of Watkins Glen had 866 male and 993 female residents.

The median income for a household in the village was $34,969 and the median income for a family was $55,357. Males had a median income of $37,885 versus $29,000 for females. The per capita income for the village was $24,116. 5.0% of the population and 1.70% of families lived below the poverty line. 3.6% of those under 18 and 6.80% of those 65 and older were living below the poverty line.

== Notable events and attractions ==
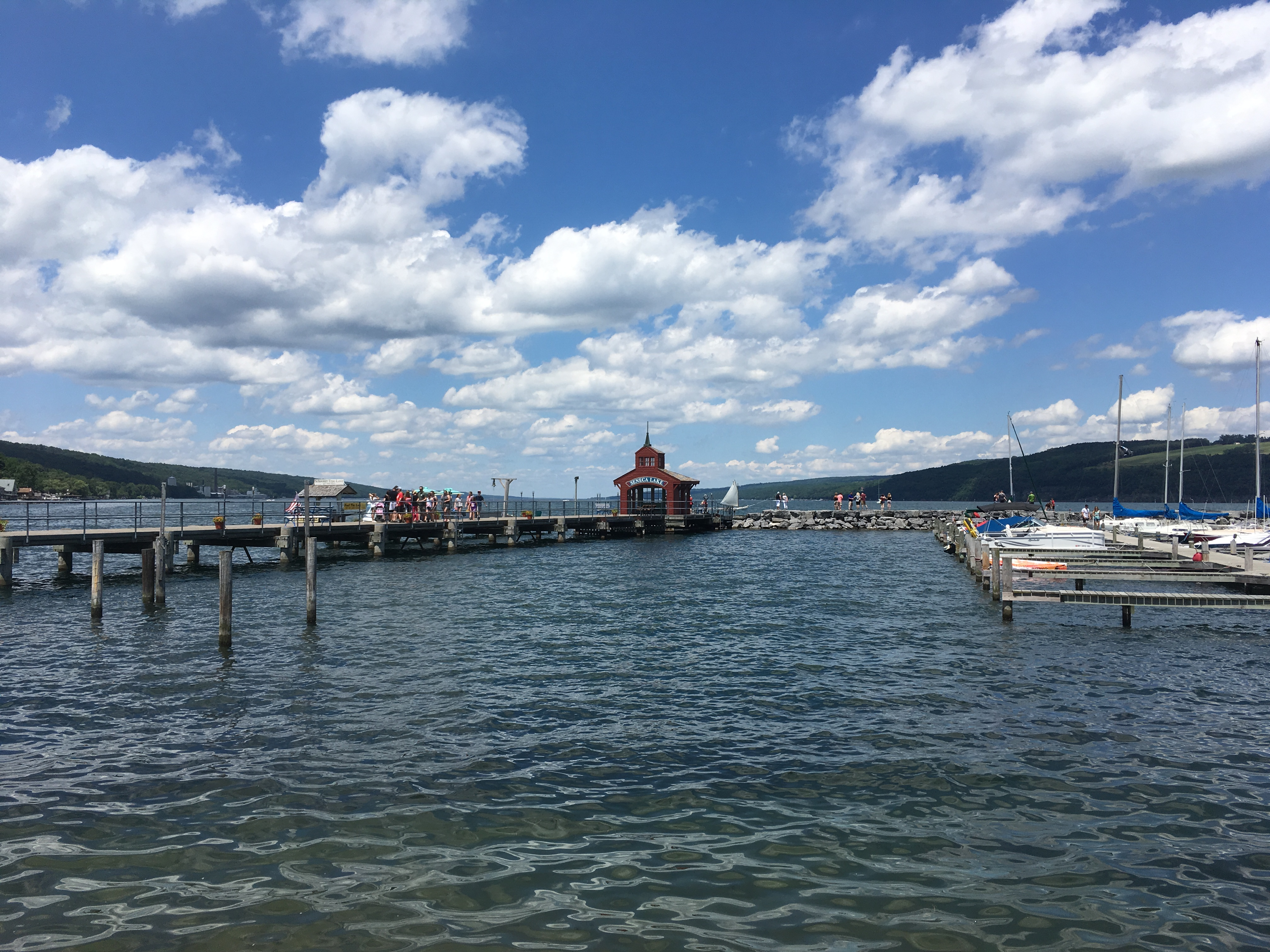
Seneca Lake from Watkins Glen

=== Watkins Glen State Park ===
Watkins Glen State Park is a 778-acre park with a 400-foot-deep (120 m) narrow gorge featuring 19 waterfalls throughout less than two miles. It is considered a "flagship" park by the State of New York.

=== Auto racing at Watkins Glen ===
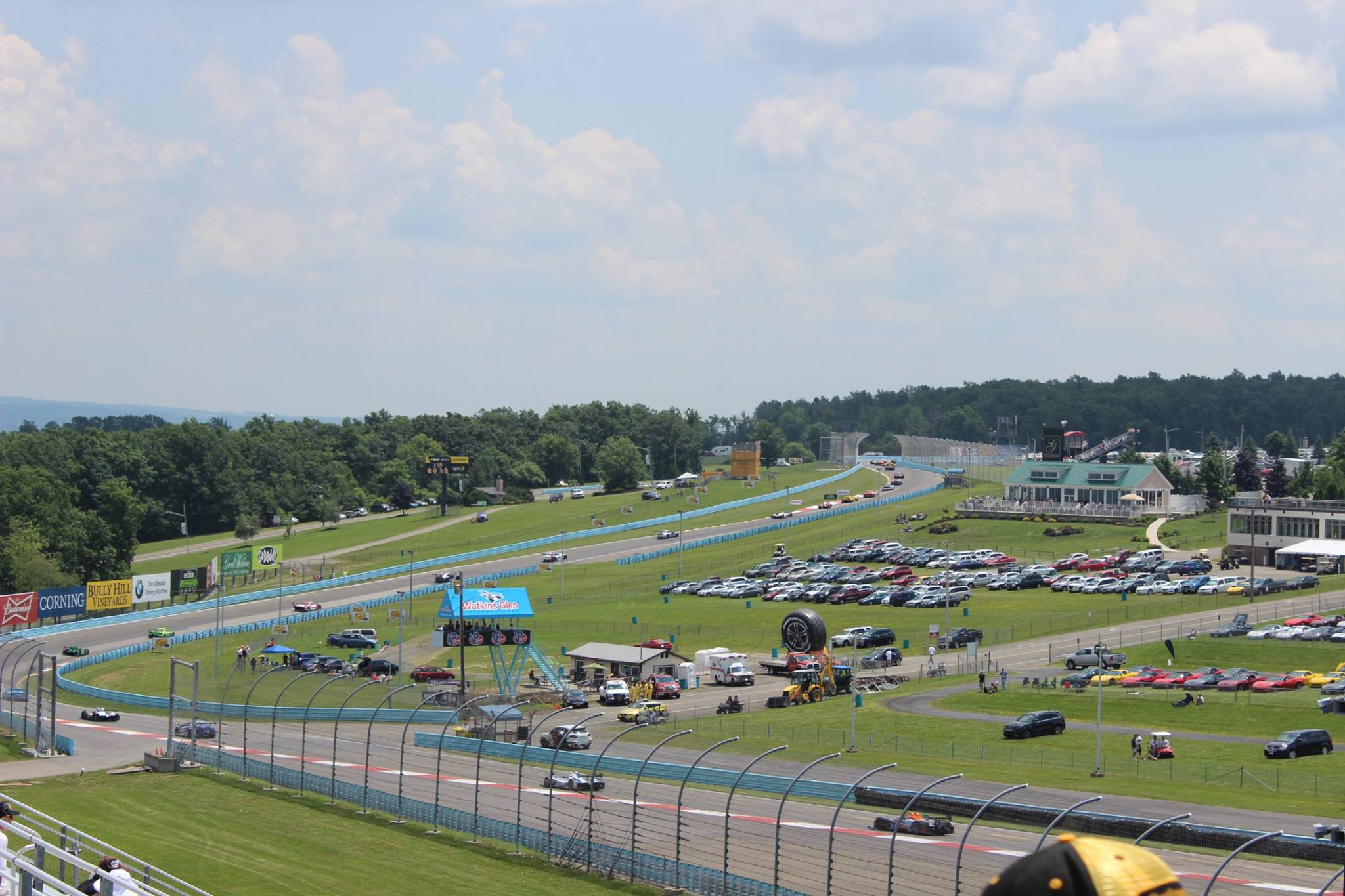
The Sahlen's Six Hours of The Glen at Watkins Glen International

Watkins Glen is noted for its role in auto racing, being the home of a street course used in road racing, a famous racetrack, Watkins Glen International, one of the premier automobile road racing tracks in the United States, which has hosted the NASCAR Cup Series Go Bowling at The Glen, IndyCar Series Grand Prix at The Glen, and the IMSA SportsCar Championship 6 Hours of Watkins Glen. The first Watkins Glen Sports Car Grand Prix was held in 1948 on public streets in and near the village. Organized by resident Cameron Argetsinger, it was the first post-WWII road race held in the United States and it marked the revival of American road racing.

The original course ran for 6.6 miles (10.6 km) and passed through the center of the village. The streets used for the original course remain intact today and a checkered flag marks the original start-finish line on the village's main street. During the 1952 race, driver Fred Wacker struck onlookers sitting on a curb on a corner coming down West 4th St. (State Route 409), killing a 7-year-old boy and injuring 10 others. The tragedy caused the end of street racing at the Glen and elsewhere in the United States.

A permanent racing facility, the Watkins Glen Grand Prix Race Course opened in 1956. It has hosted nearly every type of road racing, from the Sahlen's 6 Hours of Watkins Glen (1948-current), the Formula One United States Grand Prix (1961–1980), and the I Love New York 355 at The Glen (1957-current), which was one of the few races on the Monster Energy NASCAR Cup Series schedule not conducted on an oval speedway, the other being Sonoma Raceway until NASCAR added more road courses to the Cup Series schedule.

=== International Motor Racing Research Center ===
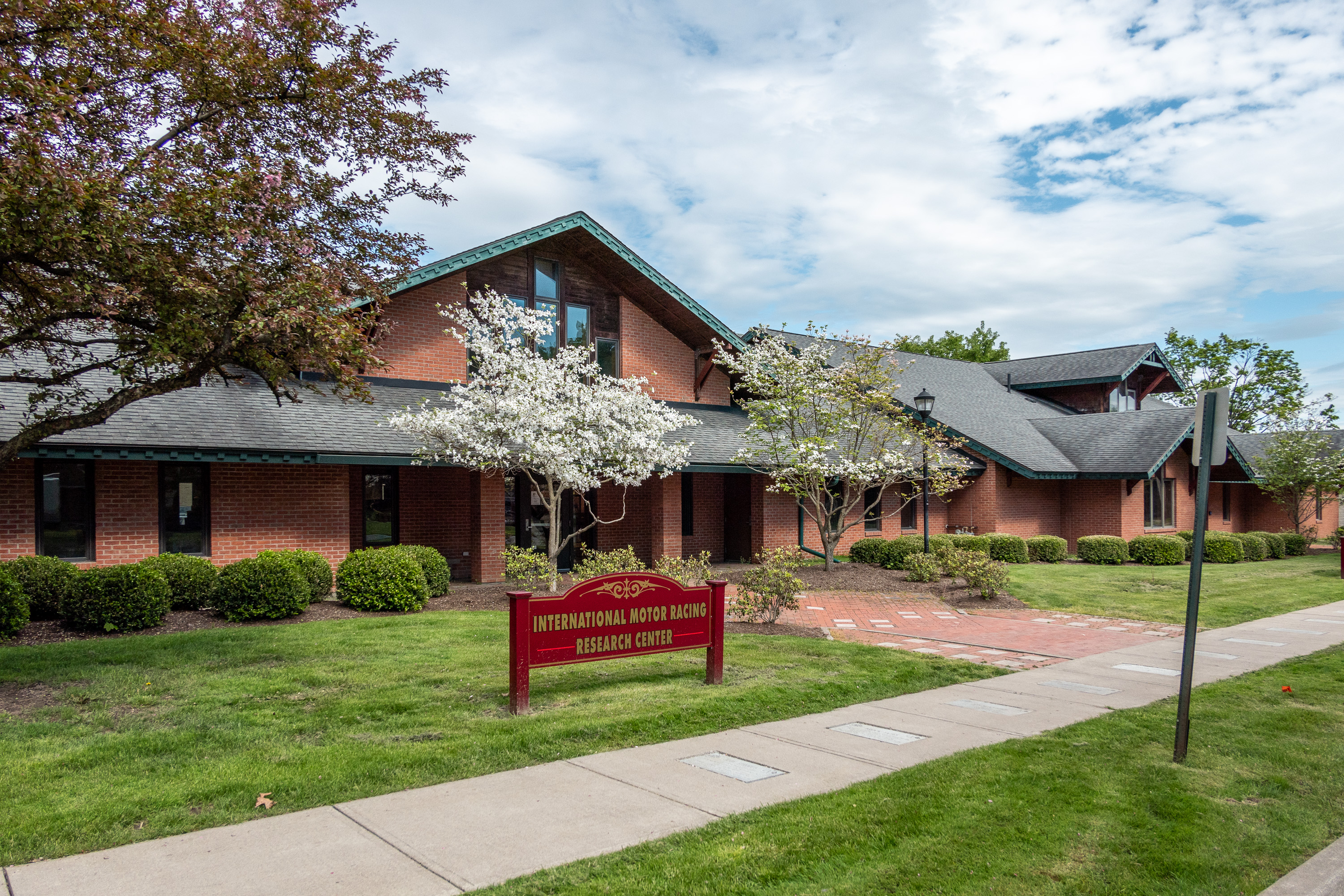
International Motor Racing Research Center

The International Motor Racing Research Center, a professional archive of motorsports history, opened in June 1999 in an annex of the Watkins Glen Public Library. The mission of the center is to preserve and share the history of motorsports around the world.

=== Personal Watercraft racing at Watkins Glen ===
Since 2014, Watkins Glen has hosted a weekend of IJSBA (International Jet Sports Boating Association) closed course racing, and has become one of the largest race venues in the sport today. Originally promoted in Region 8 by NEWA (North East Watercraft Alliance), until 2016 when East Coast Watercross purchased the series, racing has been in Seneca Lake, near Clute Memorial Park and Campground and is typically the last weekend in August. The event has always been free to spectators and features both closed course racing and freestyle competition using standup, sit-down, and sport class machines.

=== 1973 Summer Jam at Watkins Glen Rock Festival ===
The racetrack was also the scene of the July 28, 1973, Summer Jam at Watkins Glen rock festival attended by an estimated 600,000 people, one-and-a-half times the crowd at 1969's historic Woodstock Festival and a world record for the largest number of people at a pop music festival. The concert featured The Allman Brothers Band, Grateful Dead, and The Band. The music started at noon on Saturday and continued long into Sunday.

=== Phish festivals ===
On July 1–3 of 2011, the band Phish hosted Superball IX, a three-day music festival on the same grounds as the Summer Jam of '73. On August 21–23, 2015, Phish hosted their 10th festival, Magnaball, on the grounds. Phish planned to return to Watkins Glen for their 11th festival, Curveball, on August 17–19, 2018 but was forced to cancel when their permit was revoked due to floods contaminating the local water supply.

=== True Love schooner ===
Watkins Glen is the home port for True Love, a schooner built in 1926 that was featured in High Society (1956).

=== Farm animal protection movement ===
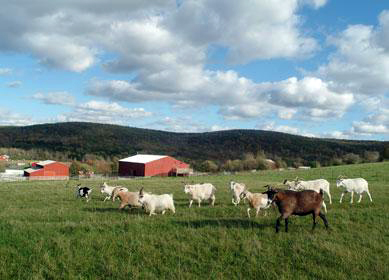
Farm Sanctuary's headquarters in Watkins Glen

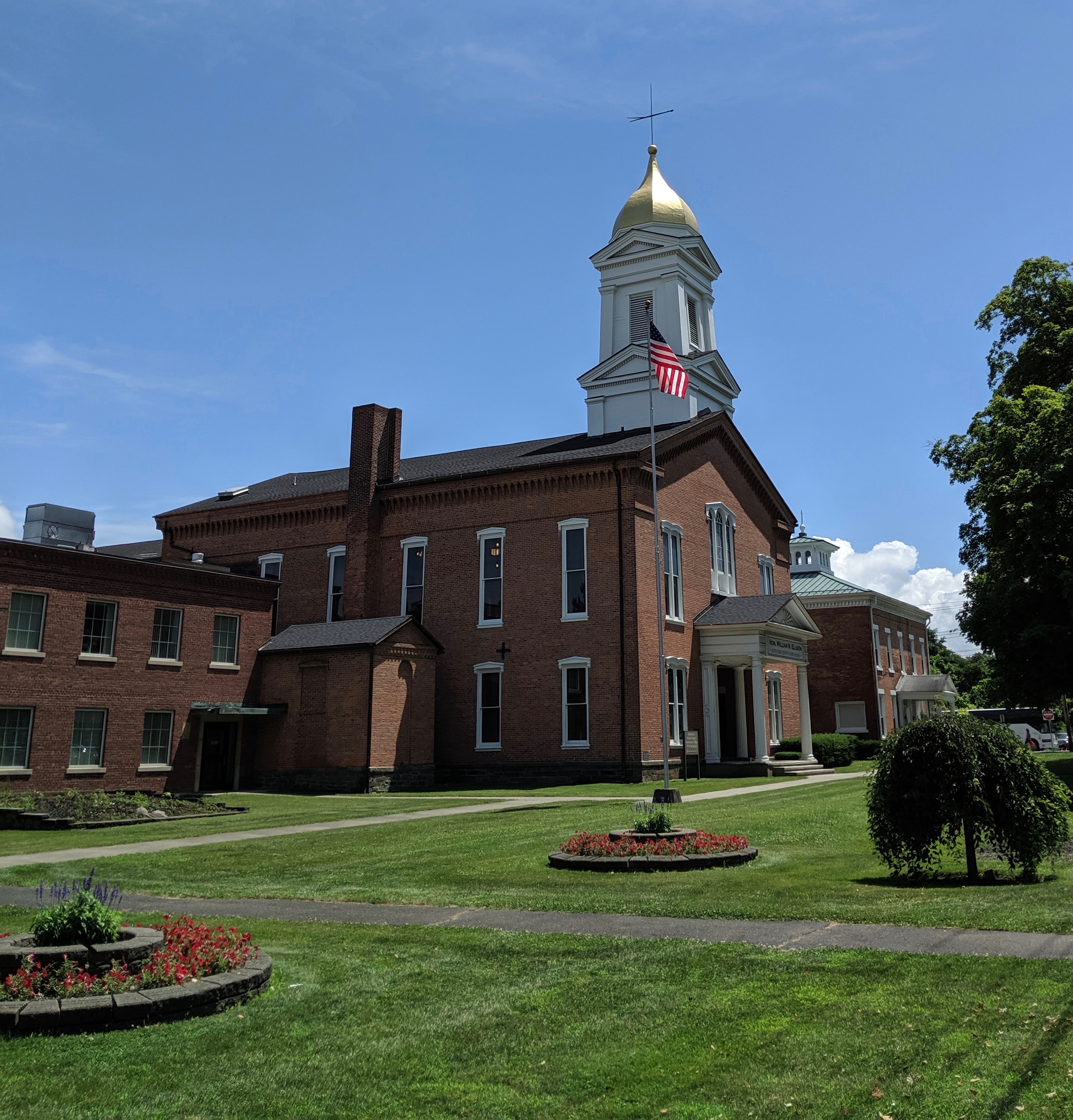
Schuyler County Courthouse in Watkins Glen

Watkins Glen is the home of Farm Sanctuary, a national farm animal protection organization co-founded by activist Gene Baur in 1986. In 1991, the organization opened a shelter in Watkins Glen that has since provided lifelong care for thousands of animals rescued from abuse; hosted numerous public events; and welcomed thousands of visitors from all over the world, sharing with them views of militant vegetarianism.

== See also ==
- Century House (publisher)
- Watkins Glen High School
