= 1951 SCCA National Sports Car Championship =

Seasons
- ← none 1952 →

The 1951 SCCA National Sports Car Championship season was the first season of the Sports Car Club of America's National Sports Car Championship. It began May 12, 1951, and ended December 9, 1951, after eight races. John Fitch won the season championship.

== Schedule ==
Rnd	Race	Length^{A}	Circuit	Location	Date
1	Giants Despair Hillclimb	1 mi (1.6 km)	Giants Despair hill climb	Laurel Run, Pennsylvania	May 12
2	Pebble Beach Road Race	100 mi (160 km)	Pebble Beach road circuit	Pebble Beach, California	May 27
3	SCCA National Races	?	Thompson International Speedway	Thompson, Connecticut	July ?
4	Elkhart Lake Road Race	200 mi (320 km)	Elkhart Lake road circuit	Elkhart Lake, Wisconsin	August 26
5	International Sports Car Grand Prix of Watkins Glen	100 mi (160 km)	Watkins Glen road circuit	Watkins Glen, New York	September 15
6	Reno Sports Car Road Races	100 mi (160 km)	Reno road circuit	Reno, Nevada	October 21
7	Climb To The Clouds	2.5 mi (4.0 km)	Mount Equinox	Manchester, Vermont	October 28
8	Road Races at Palm Beach Shores Florida	100 mi (160 km)	Palm Beach road circuit	Palm Beach, Florida	December 9

^A Feature race

== Season results ==
Note: Although support races counted towards the season points championship, only feature race overall winners are listed below.

Rnd	Circuit	Winning team	Results
Rnd	Circuit	Winning driver(s)	Results
1	Giants' Despair	Delvan Lee	Results
1	Giants' Despair	(United States) Delvan Lee	Results
2	Pebble Beach	#14 Tom Carstens	Results
2	Pebble Beach	(United States) Bill Pollack	Results
3	Thompson	MG	Results
3	Thompson	(United States) Rowland D. H. Keith	Results
4	Elkhart Lake	#128 Briggs Cunningham	Results
4	Elkhart Lake	(United States) John Fitch	Results
5	Watkins Glen	#55 Briggs Cunningham	Results
5	Watkins Glen	(United States) Phil Walters	Results
6	Reno	#14 T. Carstens	Results
6	Reno	(United States) Bill Pollack	Results
7	Mt. Equinox	#35 Maserati	Results
7	Mt. Equinox	(United States) George Weaver	Results
8	Palm Beach	#1 Ferrari	Results
8	Palm Beach	(United States) John Fitch	Results
