= 1952 SCCA National Sports Car Championship =

Seasons
- ← 1951 1953 →

The 1952 SCCA National Sports Car Championship was the second season of the Sports Car Club of America's National Sports Car Championship. It began on March 8, 1952 and ended on October 26, 1952 after eleven rounds. Sherwood Johnston won the championship.

== Schedule ==
Rnd	Race	Length^{A}	Circuit	Location	Date
1	Florida Handicap Vero Beach Endurance Road Race	12 hours	Vero Beach Airport	Vero Beach, Florida	March 8
2	Pebble Beach Sports Car Road Race	100 mi (160 km)	Pebble Beach road circuit	Pebble Beach, California	April 20
3	Bridgehampton Sports Car Road Races	100 mi (160 km)	Bridgehampton road circuit	Bridgehampton, New York	May 24
4	Golden Gate Road Race	100 mi (160 km)	Golden Gate Park	San Francisco, California	May 31
5	Climb To The Clouds	2.5 mi (4.0 km)	Mount Equinox	Manchester, Vermont	?
6	Burke Mountain Hillclimb	?	Burke Mountain	Burke, Vermont	?
7	Giants Despair Hillclimb	1 mi (1.6 km)	Giants Despair hill climb	Laurel Run, Pennsylvania	July 25
8	SCCA National Races	15 mi (24 km)	Thompson International Speedway	Thompson, Connecticut	August 17
9	Elkhart Lake Road Race	200 mi (320 km)	Elkhart Lake road circuit	Elkhart Lake, Wisconsin	September 7
10	International Sports Car Grand Prix of Watkins Glen	100 mi (160 km)	Watkins Glen road circuit	Watkins Glen, New York	September 20
11	Sowega National Sports Car Races	4 hours	Turner Air Force Base	Albany, Georgia	October 26

^A Feature race

== Championship results ==
Note: Although both support and feature races counted towards the championship, only feature race overall winners are listed below.

Rnd	Circuit	Winning team	Results
Rnd	Circuit	Winning driver(s)	Results
1	Vero Beach	#5 Ferrari	Results
1	Vero Beach	(United States) Jim Kimberly (United States) Marshall Lewis	Results
2	Pebble Beach	#14 Bill Carstens	Results
2	Pebble Beach	(United States) Bill Pollack	Results
3	Bridgehamption	#20 Bill Spear	Results
3	Bridgehamption	(United States) Bill Spear	Results
4	Golden Gate	Tom Carstens	Results
4	Golden Gate	(United States) Bill Pollack	Results
5	Mt. Equinox	?	Results
5	Mt. Equinox	(United States) George Weaver	Results
6	Burke Mountain	?	Results
6	Burke Mountain	(United States) George Weaver	Results
7	Giants Despair	#76 Briggs Cunningham	Results
7	Giants Despair	(United States) Phil Walters	Results
8	Thompson	#76 Briggs Cunningham	Results
8	Thompson	(United States) Phil Walters	Results
9	Elkhart Lake	#3 Briggs Cunningham	Results
9	Elkhart Lake	(United States) John Fitch	Results
10	Watkins Glen	not completed^{A}	Results
11	Turner	#2 Briggs Cunningham	Results
11	Turner	(United States) John Fitch	Results

^A Race not completed due to fatal accident involving spectators.
