= 1953 SCCA National Sports Car Championship =

Seasons
- ← 1952 1954 →

The 1953 SCCA National Sports Car Championship season was the third season of the Sports Car Club of America's National Sports Car Championship. It began February 21, 1953, and ended November 8, 1953, after fifteen races. Bill Spear won the season championship.

== Schedule ==
Rnd	Race	Length^{A}	Circuit	Location	Date
1	Florida National Sports Car Races	6 hours	MacDill Air Force Base	Tampa, Florida	February 21
2	Lone Star National Sports Car Races	100 mi (160 km)	Bergstrom Air Force Base	Austin, Texas	April 12
3	Pebble Beach Sports Car Road Race	100 mi (160 km)	Pebble Beach road circuit	Pebble Beach, California	April 19
4	Bridgehampton Sports Car Races	100 mi (160 km)	Bridgehampton road circuit	Bridgehampton, New York	May 23
5	Golden Gate Sports Car Races	100 mi (160 km)	Golden Gate Park	San Francisco, California	May 31
6	Race To The Clouds	2.5 mi (4.0 km)	Mount Equinox	Manchester, Vermont	June 21
7	Offutt National Sports Car Races	200 mi (320 km)	Offutt Air Force Base	Omaha, Nebraska	July 5
8	Giants Despair Hillclimb	1 mi (1.6 km)	Giants Despair hill climb	Laurel Run, Pennsylvania	July 24
9	Ohio Sesqui-centennial National Sports Car Races	100 mi (160 km)	Lockbourne Air Force Base	Columbus, Ohio	August 9
10	Moffet NAS Races	2 hours, 30 minutes	Naval Air Station Moffett	Mountain View, California	August 16
11	Janesville National Sports Car Races	92.5 mi (148.9 km)	Rock County Municipal Airport	Janesville, Wisconsin	August 23
12	Thompson National Races	15 mi (24 km)	Thompson International Speedway	Thompson, Connecticut	September 6
13	Stead National Sports Car Races	2 hours, 30 minutes	Stead Air Force Base	Reno, Nevada	October 18
14	Sowega International Sports Car Races	250 mi (400 km)	Turner Air Force Base	Albany, Georgia	October 25
15	Orange Empire National Sports Car Races	175 mi (282 km)	March Air Force Base	Moreno Valley, California	November 8

^A Feature race

== Season results ==
Note: Although support races counted towards the season points championship, only feature race overall winners are listed below.

Rnd	Circuit	Winning team	Results
Rnd	Circuit	Winning driver(s)	Results
1	MacDill	#4 Cunningham	Results
1	MacDill	(United States) John Fitch	Results
2	Bergstrom	#5 Ferrari	Results
2	Bergstrom	(United States) Jim Kimberly	Results
3	Pebble Beach	#2 Phil Hill	Results
3	Pebble Beach	(United States) Phil Hill	Results
4	Bridgehampton	#1 William C. Spear	Results
4	Bridgehampton	(United States) Bill Spear	Results
5	Golden Gate	#58 Jaguar	Results
5	Golden Gate	(United States) Masten Gregory	Results
6	Mt. Equinox	#74 Jaguar	Results
6	Mt. Equinox	(United States) Sherwood Johnston	Results
7	Offutt	#58 Masten Gregory	Results
7	Offutt	(United States) Masten Gregory	Results
8	Giants' Despair	#21 Delvan Lee	Results
8	Giants' Despair	(United States) Delvan Lee	Results
9	Lockbourne	#11 Ferrari	Results
9	Lockbourne	(United States) Bill Spear	Results
10	Moffett	#30 Bill Stroppe	Results
10	Moffett	(United States) Bill Stroppe	Results
11	Janesville	#5 Ferrari	Results
11	Janesville	(United States) Jim Kimberly	Results
12	Thompson	#32 Briggs Cunningham	Results
12	Thompson	(United States) Phil Walters	Results
13	Reno	#26 Sterling Edwards	Results
13	Reno	(United States) Sterling Edwards	Results
14	Turner	#90 Bill Spear	Results
14	Turner	(United States) Bill Spear	Results
15	March	#15 Briggs Cunningham	Results
15	March	(United States) John Fitch	Results
