= Hillclimbing in the United States =

In the United States, hill climbs have a long tradition stretching back to the early days of motoring competition. Some are in the European-style and take place on long mountain courses, and in many cases spectators are either banned or heavily restricted for safety or insurance reasons.

== Pikes Peak ==
The Pikes Peak International Hill Climb, held in Colorado Springs, Colorado, is the world's premier Hill Climb Race. This event has been entered by many internationally renowned drivers, Indy 500 champions, and multiple world rally champions. The 12.4-mile (20.0 km) course finishes at a height of 14,100 feet (4,300 m) after navigating 156 turns. The current record holder is Romain Dumas, who completed the course in 2018 with a time of 7:57.148 in the Volkswagen I.D. R Pikes Peak. Additional races are held in Colorado, conducted by the Colorado Hill Climb Association (CHCA) during the summer months. These range in length from about two miles (3 km) to five miles (8 km) long.

== Northwest Hillclimb Association ==
The Northwest Hillclimb Association (NHA) is based in the Pacific Northwest, and has been putting on a hillclimb series for several decades. NHA is currently run as a sanctioning body, and hillclimbs are hosted by various clubs in the region. The hillclimb series changes from year to year as new hills are added, and others may be cancelled due to inclement weather or road condition changes.

Vehicle classing consists primarily of SCCA Solo classing, but allows for SCCA GCR classes, SOVREN Vintage classes, and several NHA Special classes.

As of 2023, the NHA Hillclimb Series includes:
Name	Location	Hosting Club	Length (miles)	Elevation Change (feet)
Cascade Lakes Hillclimb	Ashland, OR	Siskiyou Sports Car Club	2.0	407
Cope-Myers Memorial Hillclimb	Goldendale, WA	Bridge City Autosports	2.0	531
Larison Rock Hillclimb	Oakridge, OR	Emerald Empire Sports Car Club	1.9	823
Hoopa Hillclimb	Hoopa, CA	Redwood Sports Car Club	2.1	1,152
Korbel Hillclimb	Blue Lake, CA	Redwood Sports Car Club	1.25	500
Bible Creek Hillclimb	Willamina, OR	Willamette Motor Club	2.2	653
Freeze Out Hillclimb	Emmett, ID	Bogus Basin Hillclimb Association	1.6	400
Maryhill Hillclimb	Goldendale, WA	Willamette Motor Club	2.0	531

== Eagle Rock ==
The Eagle Rock Hill Climb is the oldest recorded official hill climb ever run in the United States. Started in 1901 in what was then West Orange, New Jersey, the first race was organized by none other than Willam K. Vanderbilt Jr. It lasted for several years until safety concerns by public officials closed it down in 1906. Anniversary races were held in 1951,1956, and 1976 but were more ceremonial than competitive.

== Climb to the Clouds ==
The Climb to the Clouds hillclimb on the 7.4-mile (11.9 km) course up the Mount Washington Auto Road on Mount Washington, New Hampshire is one of the oldest motorsports events in North America, first run in 1904. However, this climb has been held only sporadically since 1961. The event was revived in 2011 and is then next scheduled event is to be held July 8–11, 2021.

== Chasing The Dragon ==
The SCCA Chasing the Dragon hillclimb on the 2.3-mile (3.7 km) course up the Maple Gap Road in Nantahala Forests, North Carolina is held once each year near the Joyce Kilmer National Forests, first run in 2011. The hillclimb was founded by Ted Theodore, Cheri Brantley and Darryl "killboy" Cannon. This hillclimb is the oldest running hillclimb in the Southeast USA and is part of the SCCA Appalachian HillClimb Series. Fastest King and Queen get a Dragonslayer sword. Current overall Record holder, & current King of the Hill, is Justin Reed in a DF Kit Car Goblin in Special Open Class with a 107.803sec run, beating out last year's KotH Cody Pucket's 111.168sec run. Current fastest female, & current Queen of the Hill, is Michele Aubele in an LS powered 2012 BMW 135i in Sport Unlimited class with a 120.255sec run, beating out last year's QotH record holder Ryan Cheek's 121.611sec run. Admission is free for spectators and safe viewing areas are found on the hill.

== Mount Equinox ==
The hill climb with the longest road, that has been continuously run, in the world is the Mount Equinox Hill Climb located in Arlington, Vermont just outside Manchester. The length of the road is 5.2 miles and the elevation change is 3,100 feet. It contains more than 40 turns and cars have been clocked at breaking 100 MPH on the long straight ending at "The Saddle". The hill climb has been run by such famous drivers as Carroll Shelby, Briggs Cunningham, René Dreyfus, John Fitch and Miles Collier to name just a few. Started in 1950 as an official SCCA event, it continues uninterrupted, as a vintage car race. Since 1973 the sanctioning body has been the Vintage Sports Car Club of America.

The first event in 1950 was won by Bill Milliken driving a FWD Miller, on a 6.25 mile shale road, in a time of 6 minutes, 59.4 sec, (54.2 m.p.h. average). The course was paved in 1953.

=== Mount Equinox Hill Climb past winners ===
Year	Driver	Vehicle	Time	Notes
1954	Bill Lloyd	Ferrari	5:04	June 20.
1955	Bill Lloyd	Maserati 3-liter	4:53.5	(63.75 m.p.h.)
1956	Bill Lloyd	Maserati #16	4:55.2	June 17.
1957	Harry Carter	Jaguar D-type #80	4:44.6 R	5.2 miles (65.77 m.p.h.)
1958				
1959	John Meyer	Cadillac Special	4:46	5.2 miles.
1960	Gordon Mackenzie	Jaguar C-type	4:46 sec	
1961	Stutz Plaisted	Cooper F2	4:35 R	
1962	Stutz Plaisted		4:25 R	
1963	Stutz Plaisted	Cooper-Buick	4:31	
1967	Jerry Crawford	Lola T70	4:11.4 sec	
1968	John Meyer		R	(75.241 m.p.h.)
1969	John Meyer	Lola T70 Mk2-Chevrolet	4:11.4	(73.463 m.p.h.)

Key: R = Course Record.

== Georgetown, California ==
On June 26, 1966, Allen Grant, driving an A.C. Shelby Cobra, won the ninth annual Georgetown Divide hillclimb. Grant climbed in 1:44.48 sec, beating Ray Seher's existing record of 1:46 sec. Over 120 cars were entered on Old Marshall Grade in the Sacramento S.C.C. sponsored event.

== New York ==
=== Ellenville, New York ===
In 1957 Vernon Bennett driving a Jaguar XK140 won an event here in 2:00.4 sec on a 1.5 mile course.

=== Rochester, New York ===
A hillclimb was held at Dugdale Hill, Rochester, New York, on October 13, 1906. The free-for-all class was won by William "Billy" Knipper (Thomas 60-h.p.) in a time of 51.8 sec.

=== Hobo Hill, New York ===
Hobo Hill, New York, 1967: "Dick Hoban's Porsche RSK was the fastest of 46 cars at the Hobo Hill hillclimb, Bellvale, N.Y., April 30. Hoban, who holds the absolute record of 38.8 seconds, went up the hill in 39 seconds." Bernie Switkes (Porsche Carrera) won an event held there on October 15, 1967.

== Virginia City, Nevada ==
The Virginia City Hillclimb event has gone through several iterations over its 50+ year history. The original route on SR 342, run in the first annual Martini Trophy Hillclimb, was scheduled for 23–24 May 1964. The event was won by Stan Peterson driving a Lotus 19 in a time of 112.804 sec. The event ran once more in 1965 under the SCCA. In 1972 the current iteration of the event was born, utilizing the SR 341 truck bypass, and although numerous other clubs have used it over the years, the Ferrari Club Southwest Region event is the oldest and sole surviving annual event. The current record holder is Benn Godenzi, driving a McLaren Senna during the 2022 event to a time of 3:03.766. Also see: Virginia City Hillclimb.

== Chimney Rock, North Carolina ==
Chimney Rock Hill Climb, North Carolina, 1956-1995: "The first races were 2.7 miles, had 18 turns, and one mandatory stop approximately halfway up. In 1960, the trek was reduced to 1.9 miles and 13 turns; the dreaded halfway stop was eliminated. In 1976, safety issues cut the course down to 1.8 miles."

=== Chimney Rock Hill Climb past winners ===
Year	Driver	Vehicle	Time	Notes
1956				
1957	Phil Styles	Davis Special		
1958	Phil Styles	Davis Special		
1959	Buddy Horton	Elva-Climax	4.00.3 sec	April 25/26.
1960	Ted Tidwell	Elva Mk.V	2:30.6 sec	April 24.
1960	Bud Schuster	Lotus Le Mans	2:28.8 sec R	
1961	Spencer Greenhill	Lotus FJ	2:21.0 sec R	
1961	Frank Harrison			Nov 25/26.
1962	Frank Harrison	Cooper FJ		
1962	Frank Harrison	Lola FJ	2:16.6 sec R	Nov 24/25.
1963	Frank Harrison	Lola-Ford 1,500 c.c.	2:15.8 sec R	May 4.
1963	Ted Tidwell	Porsche S-90	2:20.4 sec	
1964	Ted Tidwell	Porsche S-90		
1964	Ted Tidwell	Porsche 904 GTS	2:11.2 sec R	Nov 28/29.
1965	Ray Newman	Lotus 18	2:19.12 sec	April 24/25.
1965	Dec 4 Cancelled.			
1966	John Scott	A.C. Cobra 4.7-litre	2:10.5 sec R	April 24.
1966				Nov 27/8.
1967	Ted Tidwell	Bobsy-Porsche	2:26.4 sec	April 22/23. Wet.
1968	John Scott	Cobra	2:12.0 sec	April 27/28.
1969	John Scott	Cobra	2:09.144 sec R	April 20.
1970	Ted Tidwell	Zink Formula B	2:23.546 sec	May 3. Wet.
1971	Harry Ingle	Zink Super Vee	1:59.142 sec	May 1/2.
1972	Harry Ingle		1:57.314 sec R	
1972	Harry Ingle	Zink Super Vee		
1973	John Finger	Formula Super Vee		
1974	John Finger	Formula Super Vee	1:51.806 sec	
1975	Gary Davis	Volkswagen Special		April 26–27.
1976	Gary Davis	Volkswagen Special	1:54.8 sec	
1977				
1978	John Finger			
1994	Jerry Kieft	Mazda Bandit AR-1	1:43.849 R	
1995				April 28–30. Final event.

Key: R = Course Record.

== Bellefontaine, Ohio ==
The 13th annual running of the Bellefontaine Hillclimb, seven miles east Bellefontaine, Ohio, was scheduled for July 9–10, 1966, on the 0.6-mile Corkscrew Hill course, a temporarily closed public road. Steve Herbert, of Mansfield, Ohio, Porsche RS61, won the event in a record time of 37.4 seconds. "Herbert took the record away from Reg Howell of Dayton, who had run fastest last year with a time of 39.2 seconds."

== Pennsylvania ==
Hillclimbing in Pennsylvania is organized by the Pennsylvania Hillclimb Association (PHA). www.PaHillClimb.org All events are sanctioned by the Sports Car Club of America (SCCA)

=== Giants Despair Hillclimb ===
Giants Despair Hillclimb in Wilkes-Barre, Pennsylvania is the oldest continuing motorsport event in the state. The mile-long course has a 110-degree turn and up to 20% grade as racers overlook the city. Giants Despair Hillclimb is held just outside Wilkes-Barre, PA, in Laurel Run Borough on East Northampton St. This community has been host to this event since it was first held in 1906. It is one of the oldest continuing motor racing events in the world. The Giant is rich in tradition. In its early years, all of the world’s major manufacturers sent their top cars and drivers to capture honors at the event. Early notables included Ralph DePalma (Fiat Team) and Louis Chevrolet driving for Buick. Rejuvenated in 1951, the list of Who’s Who in the driving world included Carroll Shelby, first driver to break the magic minute, Roger Penske and Oscar Koveleski. In 2002 Ron Moreck broke the 40-second mark. The hill starts out with a long gently rising straight about one quarter mile in length that leads into a fast left-hander that tests both nerves and skill. Then on to a short chute and "Devils Elbow," a sharply rising hairpin that goes off camber at its crest. Next is a series of ninety-degree turns connected by short straights. Then comes "The Incline," a meandering quarter mile stretch that rises at twenty- two degrees to the finish.

- Location: Wilkes-Barre, PA
- Length: 1 mile
- Elevation Change: Approx. 650'
- Number of Turns: 6
- Record: Darryl Danko - 38.360 (2007)

=== Duryea/Pagoda Hillclimbs ===
The scenic route on the hill overlooking Reading, Pennsylvania hosts two events on the same stretch of road, the Pagoda and Duryea Hillclimbs. Pagoda is a shortened version of Duryea, starting at turn 1 and finishing at turn 9.

==== Duryea Hillclimb ====
The Blue Mountain Region SCCA hosts the longest hill in the PHA series. Named for the automobile maker PHA and following the same route that Charles Duryea used to test his cars, this is a 2.3-mile (3.7 km) hill located in a city park in downtown Reading. With a history dating back to 1951, festivities this year will include a celebration of the 100th anniversary of the automobile. Considered the most diverse and challenging hill in the Northeast, Duryea boasts 11 turns (most of which are negotiated in the first half of the course) coupled with some high (140 mph+) speeds at the top. Duryea's finish line elevation is 1100 ft.

- Location: Reading, PA
- Length: 2.3 miles
- Elevation Change: 800'
- Number of Turns: 13
- Record: George Bowland - 105.528 (2008)

==== Pagoda Hillclimb ====
This is run on the same mountain as Duryea Hillclimb. Named after the Pagoda which decorates turn 10, this is a handling course which offers all the challenges of turns 1-9 (including the famous turn 6), while leaving out the high power final straight of Duryea. The start and finish line was moved in 2011 to accommodate and larger pit area like the drivers enjoy at the Duryea event. All previous records of the old course have been archived and all new records are being recorded. The start is now at Duryea Start line, finish line is between turns 9 and 10, so there are now nine turns. Elevation above sea level at start line is 460', elevation at finish line is about 870' for a rise of 410'.

- Length: 1.35 miles
- Elevation Change: 410'
- Number of Turns: 9
- Record: Ron Moreck - 73.213 (2023)

=== Rose Valley Hillclimb ===
Located north of Williamsport, Pennsylvania, near Trout Run along Route 15, the event is typically held in late July or early August and has been contested since 1967. The course is noted for its varied layout, beginning with a relatively flat and fast lower section featuring several high-speed turns, followed by "Big Bend", a steep uphill hairpin. The remainder of the course continues uphill through a series of bends and kinks requiring careful driving before the finish line. Located just north of Williamsport, PA, off Route 15 in the town of Trout Run, PA. This event is usually held in late July or early August.

- Location: Trout Run, PA
- Length: 1.2 miles
- Elevation Change: Approx. 580'
- Number of Turns: 7
- Record: Darryl Danko - 51.770 (2006)

=== Weatherly Hillclimb ===
The season starts and ends with the Weatherly Hillclimbs. These two events are held on the outskirts of Weatherly, Pennsylvania, a quiet little town that has been hosting these events since 1960. The hill consists of uphill straights leading into hairpin turns, one called "the Wall", followed by a hairpin turn, a short run to another hard right hand turn and then the "Jump" where most cars leave contact with the pavement. From this point the rest of the hill consists of a short straight leading to a long sweeping turn to the finish that tests your tires grip on the road as well as your nerve. This hill is a rush from start to finish.

- Location: Weatherly, PA
- Length: 1 mile
- Elevation Change: Approx. 340'
- Number of Turns: 6
- Record: George Bowland - 47.592 (Spring 2012)

=== Polish Mountain Hillclimb ===
Although situated approximately one mile south of the Mason–Dixon line near Gilpin, MD, this is a PHA championship event.

- Length: 1.2 mile
- Elevation Change: Approx. 500'
- Number of Turns: 9
- Record: George Bowland - 50.708 (2008)

== Vermont ==
The New England Sports Car Club Council (NESCCC) is formed by three smaller clubs; the Killington Sports Car Club (KSCC), the Sports Car Club of New Hampshire (SCCNH), and the Sports Car Club of Vermont (SCCV). The groups sponsor a series of hill climbing events on paved mountain access roads in Vermont using common rules under the New England Hillclimb Association (NEHA). These events are staggered start, timed trials and club members as well as novices are welcome to participate provided their car passes a technical inspection and the driver meets the guidelines. In addition to numerous other safety measures, the driver must be over 18 years old, drive with a Snell® approved helmet, and have a 2.5 lb ABC fire extinguisher in his vehicle. The club's liability insurance for the race events covers a driver's damage to another car or any emergency medical treatment a driver may require. Other safety measures are outlined in the club's rules and regulations. The council meets yearly to review, update, and change these rules and regulations. One rule is that a car need not have a roll cage and other additional safety measures unless they exceed a course's breakout time. If a racer exceeds the breakout time more than once, they are required to have a roll cage in their car, and must wear a fire suit and neck protection device.

The races take place during the summer months on weekends. Spectators are prohibited and the club controls this by renting the hills for their own use during race weekends. Only at Okemo are spectators permitted to watch from the starting line. Non-racers can participate in events by volunteering as workers and these workers can be 16 years old or older.

The race hills, length of course, and breakout times for each course are as follows:

- Ascutney in Windsor - 2.9 miles, breakout time 3:20
- Bolton - 1.8 miles, breakout time 1:32 (has not been run since 2004)
- Burke in Lyndonville - 2.1 miles, breakout time 2:30
- Okemo in Ludlow - 2.7 miles, breakout time 2:43
- Philo in Charlotte - 1.1 miles, breakout time 1:20

== Rib Mountain, Wisconsin ==
On June 15–16, 1957, the Milwaukee region of the S.C.C.A. held their first national event at Rib Mountain near Wausau, Wisconsin. John Kilborn (driving a Ferrari Monza) set the fastest time of the day in 1.299 minutes. The organizers used a novel system of timing, measuring in minutes to three decimal places. This was the only time such an event was held at Rib Mountain.

== Ten Sleep, Wyoming ==
First Place in the 1961 contest went to Chuck Frederick of Golden, Colo., driving a Corvette up the winding course at better than a mile a minute; time, 4:39. First Place in the 1962 contest went to Gene Mitchell of Billings, Mont., driving a Corvette over the dangerous five-mile course in 4:51.7 averaging 61.7 mph. The 1961 and 1962 information is from the 1963 Ten Sleep Canyon Sports Car Hill Climb program, inside front cover. Chuck Frederick set the Track record of 4:35.6 in 1964 Driving a Lotus 19 with a 289 V8. On August 15, 1965, Phillip Lyman, of Ten Sleep, Wyoming, won the fifth annual TenSleep Canyon hillclimb, driving a Chevrolet Corvette Sting Ray, in a time of 4:48.1 sec.

== See also ==
- Sports Car Club of America
- Mount Washington Hillclimb Auto Race
- Hillclimbing in the British Isles
