= Archie Butterworth =

- Born: Archibald James Butterworth; 19 June 1912; Waterford, Ireland
- Died: 12 February 2005 (aged 92)
- Occupations: Engineer, inventor, racing driver
- Known for: Butterworth Engineering
- Notable work: The Butterworth flat-four engine The A.J.B. Special four-wheel drive racing car

Archibald James Butterworth (19 June 1912 – 12 February 2005) was an inventor and racing motorist who, in 1948, designed and constructed the A.J.B. Special, a four-wheel drive Formula One car. He was winner of the Brighton Speed Trials in 1949 and 1951. After a serious accident in 1951, he gave up competition, but continued to supply race car engines of his own design, notably to Bill Aston for the Aston Butterworth Grand Prix car and Archie Scott Brown for the Elva-Butterworth sports racing car.

== Early life ==
Educated at the Mount St Mary's College, attended University College, London, but left to join the army: Irish Guards, then RASC-MT as driving instructor. Posted to special unit in Egypt. Left the Army in 1937 but returned at start of WW2. After Dunkirk he spent the duration of the war, and up to 1950, on armament design, when he established Butterworth Engineering, of Frimley, Surrey. He raced a Bentley 4½ Litre from 1946 and became a member of the BRDC in 1947.

== The A.J.B. Special ==
The A.J.B. Special, dubbed S2, was built for £300 in 1948. The car was powered by a war-surplus air-cooled Steyr V8 engine. Butterworth was inspired by Sydney Allard's Steyr-powered single-seater, which went on to win the British Hill Climb Championship in 1949. The A.J.B. ran on a mixture of: "80/12/8 methanol, benzole, petrol." The A.J.B. was entered for the hill climb at Stanmer Park, Brighton, Sussex, held on 5 June 1948 but was a non-starter.

Archie Butterworth: A.J.B. race results
Year	Event	Result	Notes
1948	Brighton Speed Trials	31.32 sec	4 Sept. Standing Start Km. Debut of A.J.B. 3rd in class.
1948	Prescott Speed Hill Climb	56.12 sec	12 Sept. 5th in class.
1948	Weston Super Mare Speed Trials	23.16 sec	9 Oct. 6th O/A, tie with E. Lloyd-Jones, Triangle Skinner Spl.
1949	Silverstone	Retired.	2 July. Four lap scratch race for racing cars.
1949	Shelsley Walsh Hill Climb	43.15 sec	11 July. 4th in class. 5th R.A.C. Championship class.
1949	Prescott Speed Hill Climb	48.07 sec	17 July. 3rd in class. Team prize with Poore and Fry.
1949	Bouley Bay Hill Climb	59.2 sec	21 July.
1949	Great Auclum National Speed Hill Climb	23.75 sec	14 Aug. Class record. 3rd FTD.
1949	Brighton Speed Trials	24.91 sec, FTD	3 Sept. Standing Start Km.
1949	Prescott Speed Hill Climb	47.11 sec	11 Sept. 3rd in class.
1949	Weston Super Mare Speed Trials	24.6 sec	8 Oct. ½ mile curving course. Fastest unsupercharged.
1950	Rest and Be Thankful Speed Hill Climb	67.97 sec	1 July. 2nd to Allard in over 3,000 c.c. non-S/C class.
1950	Great Auclum National Speed Hill Climb	23.50 sec, FTD	23 July.
1950	Blandford Hill Climb	30.36 sec, FTD	29 July.
1950	Daily Express Int'l Trophy, Silverstone	Retired Lap 1.	26 Aug. Heat 1 broken crankshaft.
1950	Prescott Speed Hill Climb	47.85 sec	10 Sept. 3rd in class.
1950	Shelsley Walsh Speed Hill Climb	Accident.	23 Sept. Crash in practice.
1951	West Essex C.C. Speed Trial, Boreham	25.12 sec, FTD	1 April.
1951	Gosport A.C. Speed Trials	12.69 sec, FTD	17 June. Straight ¼ mile sprint.
1951	Shelsley Walsh Speed Hill Climb	39.44 sec	23 June. Fastest unsupercharged car.
1951	Boreham Airfield	Second.	30 June. Scratch race won by Rolt's E.R.A.-Delage.
1951	Scottish Grand Prix, Winfield	Retired Lap 13.	21 July.
1951	Brighton Speed Trials	26.63 sec, FTD	1 Sept. Standing Start Km.
1951	Prescott Speed Hill Climb	47.45 sec	9 Sept. 3rd in class.
1951	Shelsley Walsh Speed Hill Climb	Accident	22 September.
1951	Goodwood	Non-starter.	25 Sept.

Key: FTD = Fastest Time of the Day; non-S/C = Unsupercharged.

At Shelsley Walsh on 22 September 1951: "An unfortunate accident happened to A.J. Butterworth when the A.J.B. hit the bank at Kennel Bend, tore off a rear wheel and left the road. Butterworth was badly hurt." The Manchester Guardian reported: "A.J. Butterworth, the racing driver, of Frimley, near Aldershot, was injured when his A.J.B. car (4,425 c.c.) crashed down a steep bank at the Midland Automobile Club's hill-climb at Shelsley Walsh Hill in Worcestershire on Saturday. A wheel of his car caught a guttering on the edge of the track and came off. Butterworth was picked up unconscious and was stated at Worcester Royal Infirmary on Saturday night to be in a serious condition. Motor Sport published a photograph of Butterworth in the #79 A.J.B. leaving the road at Shelsley Walsh. He recovered from his injuries.

== The 'Butterball Special' ==
AJB/FWD 'Butterball Special' at the FWD Museum, Clintonville, Wisconsin. Note the car carries #90 from last race at Watkins Glen in 1957.

Bill Milliken visited Prescott Hill Climb in England in 1951, where he saw the A.J.B. in competition. An offer to purchase the car was declined, but subsequently accepted following Archie Butterworth's accident at Shelsley Walsh. The remains of the A.J.B. were exported to the U.S.A. early in 1952, rebuilt and renamed the Butterball Special, a play on Butterworth's name. The rebuild was carried out in Buffalo, New York: "It has since been extensively redesigned with longer wheelbase, new rear suspension, improved steering, brakes, chassis and body. This work was performed in the Flight Research and Vehicle Dynamics Department of Cornell Aeronautical Laboratory under the direction of William Close." The car was then driven in competition by Bill Milliken:

Bill Milliken: AJB/FWD 'Butterball Special' race results
Year	Event	Result	Notes
1952	Watkins Glen, NY, Seneca Cup	DNF	20 Sept. #24 pole position. Lost control after Milliken's Corner. Ret'd due to flex in steering.
1953	Pikes Peak Hill Climb, CO.	DNQ	7 Sept. #46 shift lever broke.
1953	Watkins Glen, NY.	DNS	19 Sept. #1 crankcase webs cracked.
1955	Edenvale, Ontario	DNF	18 June. #22 panhard rod failed.
1955	Giant's Despair Hillclimb, PA.	63.771 sec	22 July. #111 3rd O/A.
1955	Watkins Glen, NY.	DNF	17 Sept. #47 clutch failure.
1956	Mount Equinox Hillclimb, VT.	5:30.02 sec	17 June. #15 unplaced. O/A winner Bill Lloyd, #16 Maserati, 4:55.2.
1956	Giant's Despair Hillclimb, PA.	1:02.441 sec	20 July. Unrestricted class: 2nd #57 W. Milliken, AJB/FWD.
1956	Watkins Glen, NY.	15th	15 Sept. #2 third in class and 15th O/A.
1957	Holland Hill Climb, NY.	0.8672 min FTD	25 Aug. Set track record.
1957	Watkins Glen, NY, Seneca Cup	7th	21 Sept. 11 laps, #90 7th O/A and 5th in unrestricted.

Key: FTD = Fastest Time of the Day.

In autumn 1957 the car was shipped to the Four Wheel Drive Company Museum in Clintonville, Wisconsin. The car was still there in 2010 (see photograph).

== Aston Butterworth ==
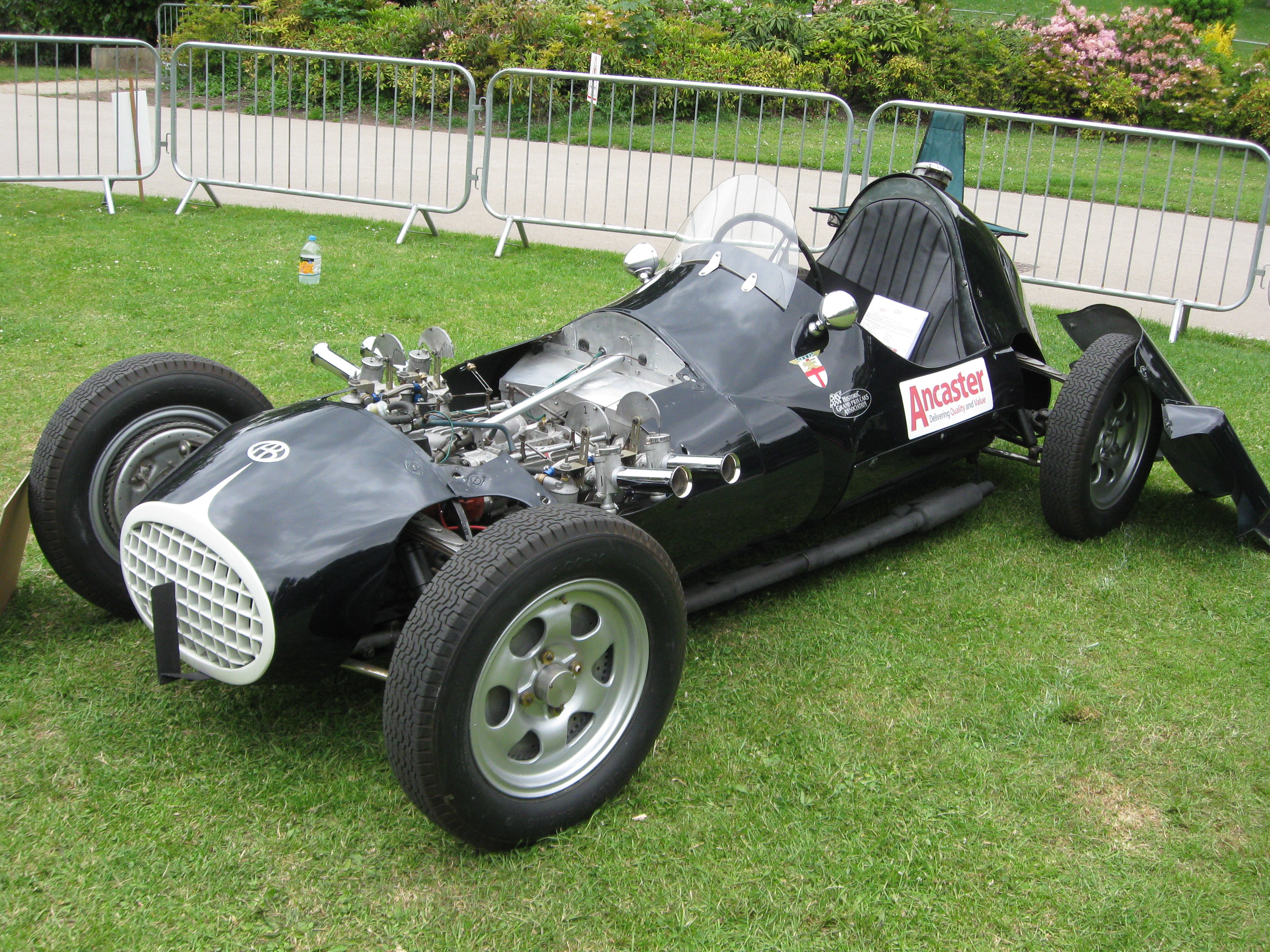
Aston Butterworth NB42 displayed at Motor Sport at the Palace Crystal Palace circuit, 25 May 2015

For 1952 Butterworth teamed up with Bill Aston to build the Aston Butterworth, an F2 car that competed in Grand Prix races, but was unreliable. Butterworth built the 1,986 c.c. air-cooled, flat-four-cylinder motors.

== Kieft Butterworth ==
At the 1954 Motor Show in London Kieft Cars displayed a motor described by Bill Boddy as: "the Kieft/Norton air-cooled flat-four 1½-litre which gives over 100 b.h.p." This was a version of the Butterworth motor fitted with Norton cylinder heads. Ian Richardson successfully used this engine during the 1970s in the Moonraker drag racing motorcycle.

== Elva Butterworth ==
Archie Scott Brown drove the Elva-Butterworth Mk III sports-racing car in a support race at the Silverstone International Trophy meeting in 1957 where: "The Elva-Butterworth retired with a broken valve-Butterworth will have difficulty living this down but, in fact, it was an exhaust valve and not a Butterworth flap valve which dropped."

== Tojeiro Butterworth ==
The Tojeiro-Butterworth sports-racing car was built by R.C.C Palmer over a period of more than three years to 1960. Although built as a race car, it was never raced. Only one example was produced. "Mr. Palmer was especially keen to get the cooling right as he felt that inefficient cooling was part of the trouble with the Elva-Butterworth which Archie Scott-Brown (sic) drove on several occasions." The car was road registered XNK 900.

== Later life ==
Following the death of his friend Archie Scott Brown in 1958, Archie Butterworth was less involved in motor racing. He was instrumental in founding the British Sporting Rifle Club in 1962.
