= 1998 Monterey Sports Car Championships =

Track map of Laguna Seca Raceway

The 1998 Monterey Sports Car Championships was the final race for the 1998 IMSA GT Championship season and the final race for the IMSA GT Championship before the series would be reorganized into the American Le Mans Series. It took place on October 25, 1998, at Laguna Seca Raceway. This event was a shared event with the FIA GT Championship (report here).

== Official results ==
Class winners in bold.

| Pos | Class | No | Team | Drivers | Chassis | Tyre | Laps |
| Pos | Class | No | Team | Drivers | Engine | Tyre | Laps |
|---|---|---|---|---|---|---|---|
| 1 | **WSC** | **2** | **(Germany) BMW Motorsport** | **(Belgium) Didier de Radiguès (United States) Bill Auberlen** | **Riley & Scott Mk III** | **M** | **81** |
| 1 | **WSC** | **2** | **(Germany) BMW Motorsport** | **(Belgium) Didier de Radiguès (United States) Bill Auberlen** | **BMW 4.0 L V8** | **M** | **81** |
| 2 | **GT1** | **4** | **(United States) Panoz Motorsports** | **(United Kingdom) Andy Wallace (Australia) David Brabham** | **Panoz GTR-1** | **M** | **81** |
| 2 | **GT1** | **4** | **(United States) Panoz Motorsports** | **(United Kingdom) Andy Wallace (Australia) David Brabham** | **Ford (Roush) 6.0 L V8** | **M** | **81** |
| 3 | GT1 | 5 | (United States) Panoz Motorsports | (United States) Johnny O'Connell (France) Éric Bernard | Panoz GTR-1 | **M** | 81 |
| 3 | GT1 | 5 | (United States) Panoz Motorsports | (United States) Johnny O'Connell (France) Éric Bernard | Ford (Roush) 6.0 L V8 | **M** | 81 |
| 4 | WSC | 16 | (United States) Dyson Racing | (United Kingdom) James Weaver (United States) Butch Leitzinger | Riley & Scott Mk III | **G** | 81 |
| 4 | WSC | 16 | (United States) Dyson Racing | (United Kingdom) James Weaver (United States) Butch Leitzinger | Ford 5.0 L V8 | **G** | 81 |
| 5 | **GT2** | **72** | **(Germany) Konrad Motorsport** | **(Netherlands) Jan Lammers (Austria) Franz Konrad** | **Porsche 911 GT2** | **D** | **78** |
| 5 | **GT2** | **72** | **(Germany) Konrad Motorsport** | **(Netherlands) Jan Lammers (Austria) Franz Konrad** | **Porsche 3.6 L Turbo Flat-6** | **D** | **78** |
| 6 | WSC | 7 | (United States) Doyle-Risi Racing | (Belgium) Eric van de Poele (South Africa) Wayne Taylor | Ferrari 333 SP | **P** | 78 |
| 6 | WSC | 7 | (United States) Doyle-Risi Racing | (Belgium) Eric van de Poele (South Africa) Wayne Taylor | Ferrari F310E 4.0 L V12 | **P** | 78 |
| 7 | WSC | 28 | (United States) Intersport Racing | (United States) Jon Field (United States) Rick Sutherland | Riley & Scott Mk III | **G** | 78 |
| 7 | WSC | 28 | (United States) Intersport Racing | (United States) Jon Field (United States) Rick Sutherland | Ford 5.0 L V8 | **G** | 78 |
| 8 | WSC | 27 | (United States) Doran Enterprises, Inc. | (Belgium) Didier Theys (Switzerland) Fredy Lienhard | Ferrari 333 SP | **Y** | 77 |
| 8 | WSC | 27 | (United States) Doran Enterprises, Inc. | (Belgium) Didier Theys (Switzerland) Fredy Lienhard | Ferrari F310E 4.0 L V12 | **Y** | 77 |
| 9 | GT2 | 71 | (Netherlands) Marcos Racing International | (Netherlands) Cor Euser (Netherlands) Herman Buurman | Marcos LM600 | ? | 76 |
| 9 | GT2 | 71 | (Netherlands) Marcos Racing International | (Netherlands) Cor Euser (Netherlands) Herman Buurman | Chevrolet 6.0 L V8 | ? | 76 |
| 10 | **GT3** | **23** | **(United States) Alex Job Racing** | **(United States) David Murry (United States) Cort Wagner** | **Porsche 964 Carrera RSR** | **P** | **77** |
| 10 | **GT3** | **23** | **(United States) Alex Job Racing** | **(United States) David Murry (United States) Cort Wagner** | **Porsche 3.8 L Flat-66** | **P** | **77** |
| 11 | GT2 | 56 | (United States) Martin Snow Racing | (United States) Martin Snow (United States) Melanie Snow | Porsche 911 GT2 | ? | 75 |
| 11 | GT2 | 56 | (United States) Martin Snow Racing | (United States) Martin Snow (United States) Melanie Snow | Porsche 3.6 L Turbo Flat-6 | ? | 75 |
| 12 | GT3 | 6 | (United States) Prototype Technology Group | (United States) Peter Cunningham (United States) Mark Simo | BMW M3 | **Y** | 75 |
| 12 | GT3 | 6 | (United States) Prototype Technology Group | (United States) Peter Cunningham (United States) Mark Simo | BMW 3.2 L I6 | **Y** | 75 |
| 13 | WSC | 88 | (United States) Dollahite Racing | (United States) Mike Davies (United States) Bill Dollahite | Ferrari 333 SP | **Y** | 75 |
| 13 | WSC | 88 | (United States) Dollahite Racing | (United States) Mike Davies (United States) Bill Dollahite | Ferrari F310E 4.0 L V12 | **Y** | 75 |
| 14 | GT3 | 68 | (United States) The Racer's Group | (United States) Vic Rice (United States) Kevin Buckler | Porsche 911 Carrera RSR | ? | 74 |
| 14 | GT3 | 68 | (United States) The Racer's Group | (United States) Vic Rice (United States) Kevin Buckler | Porsche 3.8 L Flat-6 | ? | 74 |
| 15 | GT2 | 99 | (United States) Schumacher Racing | (United States) Larry Schumacher (United States) John O'Steen (United Kingdom) Andy Pilgrim | Porsche 911 GT2 | **P** | 73 |
| 15 | GT2 | 99 | (United States) Schumacher Racing | (United States) Larry Schumacher (United States) John O'Steen (United Kingdom) Andy Pilgrim | Porsche 3.6 L Flat-6 | **P** | 73 |
| 16 | GT3 | 55 | (United States) AASCO Performance | (United States) Tim Ralston (United States) Charles Slater | Porsche 911 Carrera RSR | ? | 73 |
| 16 | GT3 | 55 | (United States) AASCO Performance | (United States) Tim Ralston (United States) Charles Slater | Porsche 3.8 L Flat-6 | ? | 73 |
| 17 | GT3 | 1 | (United States) Prototype Technology Group | (United States) Bill Auberlen (United States) Peter Cunningham | BMW M3 | **Y** | 73 |
| 17 | GT3 | 1 | (United States) Prototype Technology Group | (United States) Bill Auberlen (United States) Peter Cunningham | BMW 3.2 L I6 | **Y** | 73 |
| 18 | WSC | 63 | (United States) Downing Atlanta | (United States) Chris Ronson (United States) Jim Downing | Kudzu DLY | **G** | 72 |
| 18 | WSC | 63 | (United States) Downing Atlanta | (United States) Chris Ronson (United States) Jim Downing | Mazda R26B 2.6 L 4-Rotor | **G** | 72 |
| 19 | WSC | 60 | (United States) Kopf Race Products | (United States) Kris Wilson (United States) Shane Donley | Keiler KII | **G** | 72 |
| 19 | WSC | 60 | (United States) Kopf Race Products | (United States) Kris Wilson (United States) Shane Donley | Ford 5.0 L V8 | **G** | 72 |
| 20 | GT3 | 17 | (United States) AASCO Performance | (United States) Tom Peterson (United States) Dennis Aase | Porsche 911 Carrera RSR | ? | 71 |
| 20 | GT3 | 17 | (United States) AASCO Performance | (United States) Tom Peterson (United States) Dennis Aase | Porsche 3.8 L Flat-6 | ? | 71 |
| 21 | GT3 | 22 | (United States) Alex Job Racing | (United States) Kelly Collins (United States) Darryl Havens | Porsche 911 Carrera RSR | ? | 67 |
| 21 | GT3 | 22 | (United States) Alex Job Racing | (United States) Kelly Collins (United States) Darryl Havens | Porsche 3.8 L Flat-6 | ? | 67 |
| 22 DNF | WSC | 20 | (United States) Dyson Racing | (United States) Dorsey Schroeder (United States) Elliot Forbes-Robinson | Riley & Scott Mk III | **G** | 65 |
| 22 DNF | WSC | 20 | (United States) Dyson Racing | (United States) Dorsey Schroeder (United States) Elliot Forbes-Robinson | Ford 5.0 L V8 | **G** | 65 |
| 23 DNF | WSC | 51 | (United States) Fantasy Junction | (United States) Spencer Trenery (United States) Bruce Trenery | Cannibal | **G** | 61 |
| 23 DNF | WSC | 51 | (United States) Fantasy Junction | (United States) Spencer Trenery (United States) Bruce Trenery | Chevrolet 6.0 L V8 | **G** | 61 |
| 24 DNF | WSC | 29 | (United States) Intersport Racing | (Canada) Jacek Mucha (United States) Ken Dromm | Riley & Scott Mk III | **G** | 57 |
| 24 DNF | WSC | 29 | (United States) Intersport Racing | (Canada) Jacek Mucha (United States) Ken Dromm | Ford 5.0 L V8 | **G** | 57 |
| 25 DNF | GT3 | 67 | (United States) The Racer's Group | (United States) Steve Pelke (United States) Scott Killips | Porsche 911 Carrera RSR | ? | 40 |
| 25 DNF | GT3 | 67 | (United States) The Racer's Group | (United States) Steve Pelke (United States) Scott Killips | Porsche 3.8 L Flat-6 | ? | 40 |
| 26 DNF | GT3 | 76 | (United States) Team A.R.E. | (United States) Mike Doolin (United States) Scott Peeler | Porsche 993 Carrera RSR | **Y** | 31 |
| 26 DNF | GT3 | 76 | (United States) Team A.R.E. | (United States) Mike Doolin (United States) Scott Peeler | Porsche 3.8 L Flat-6 | **Y** | 31 |
| 27 DNF | GT3 | 10 | (United States) Prototype Technology Group | (Canada) Ross Bentley (United States) Mark Simo | BMW M3 | **Y** | 28 |
| 27 DNF | GT3 | 10 | (United States) Prototype Technology Group | (Canada) Ross Bentley (United States) Mark Simo | BMW 3.2 L I6 | **Y** | 28 |
| 28 DNF | WSC | 3 | (Germany) BMW Motorsport | (United Kingdom) Steve Soper (Germany) Hans-Joachim Stuck | Riley & Scott Mk III | **M** | 20 |
| 28 DNF | WSC | 3 | (Germany) BMW Motorsport | (United Kingdom) Steve Soper (Germany) Hans-Joachim Stuck | BMW 4.0 L V8 | **M** | 20 |
| 29 DNF | WSC | 8 | (United States) Transatlantic Racing Services | (United States) Scott Schubot (United States) Henry Camferdam | Riley & Scott Mk III | **D** | 16 |
| 29 DNF | WSC | 8 | (United States) Transatlantic Racing Services | (United States) Scott Schubot (United States) Henry Camferdam | Ford 5.0 L V8 | **D** | 16 |
| 30 DNF | GT2 | 25 | (United States) Alex Job Racing | (United States) 'Trip' Goolsby (United States) Don Kitch (United States) Michael Petersen | Porsche 964 Carrera RSR | ? | 11 |
| 30 DNF | GT2 | 25 | (United States) Alex Job Racing | (United States) 'Trip' Goolsby (United States) Don Kitch (United States) Michael Petersen | Porsche 3.8 L Flat-6 | ? | 11 |
| 31 DNF | GT2 | 65 | (United States) Saleen Allen Speedlab | (United States) Terry Borcheller (United Kingdom) Andy Pilgrim (United States) Ron Johnson | Saleen Mustang SR | ? | 7 |
| 31 DNF | GT2 | 65 | (United States) Saleen Allen Speedlab | (United States) Terry Borcheller (United Kingdom) Andy Pilgrim (United States) Ron Johnson | Ford 5.9 L V8 | ? | 7 |

=== Statistics ===
- Pole Position - #4 Panoz Motorsports - 1:17.754
- Average Speed - 164.62 km/h
