= John Fitch (racing driver) =

American racing driver (1917–2012)

- Born: August 4, 1917; Indianapolis, Indiana, U.S.
- Died: October 31, 2012 (aged 95) near Lime Rock, Connecticut, U.S.

Formula One World Championship career
- Nationality: (United States) American
- Active years: 1953, 1955
- Team(s): HWM-Alta, Stirling Moss Ltd.
- Entries: 2
- Championships: 0
- Wins: 0
- Podiums: 0
- Career points: 0
- Pole positions: 0
- Fastest laps: 0
- First entry: 1953 Italian Grand Prix
- Last entry: 1955 Italian Grand Prix

John Cooper Fitch (August 4, 1917 in Indianapolis, Indiana – October 31, 2012) was an American racing driver and inventor. He was the first American to race automobiles successfully in Europe in the post-war era.

In the course of a driving career which spanned 18 years, Fitch won such notable sports car races as the Gran Premio de Eva Duarte Perón – Sport, 1953 12 Hours of Sebring, 1955 Mille Miglia (production car class), and the 1955 RAC Tourist Trophy, as well as numerous SCCA National Sports Car Championship races. He was also involved in Briggs Cunningham's ambitious Le Mans projects in the early 1950s, and was later a member of the Mercedes-Benz sport car team. He also competed in two World Championship Grands Prix.

After retirement in 1964, Fitch was the manager of Lime Rock circuit, and a former team boss of Chevrolet's Corvette racing team. His biggest legacy is motor sport safety, as well as pioneering work to improve road car safety, and this has helped save countless lives. He had worked on advanced driver safety capsule systems. He was also a track design consultant, as well as inventing many other automotive devices. Even into his 90s, Fitch was still a consultant, and appeared at historic events.

== Early life ==
John Fitch was born in Indianapolis, Indiana, in 1917. He was a descendant of the inventor of the steamboat, John Fitch. Fitch's stepfather was an executive with the Stutz Motor Company, which introduced him to cars and racing at an early age. In the late thirties, Fitch attended Kentucky Military Institute, then studied civil engineering at Lehigh University. In 1939, he travelled to Europe and saw the last car race at Brooklands before the outbreak of World War II. He returned to the United States, and sailed around the Gulf of Mexico in a 32-foot schooner from Sarasota to New Orleans.

== World War II ==
Fitch's first passion was not cars, but airplanes, so it was not surprising that when war broke out, he volunteered to become a pilot, whilst in England on an extended trip around the world (1939). In spring of 1941, he volunteered for the United States Army Air Corps. His service took him to North Africa, where he flew the A-20 Havoc and then on to England. By 1944, Captain Fitch was a P-51 Mustang pilot with the Fourth Fighter Group on bomber escort missions, and became one of the Americans to shoot down a German Messerschmitt Me 262 jet fighter. Just two months before the end of the war, he was shot down himself while making an ill-advised third strafing pass on an Axis train and spent the rest of the war as a prisoner of war.

== Racing career ==
When Fitch returned to the U.S., he was among many young pilots who had developed the need for speed during the conflict. Fitch opened an MG car dealership and also began racing an MG-TC at tracks like Bridgehampton, Thompson, and Watkins Glen. Unlike many of his contemporaries, Fitch was good. So good in fact, he caught the attention of the wealthy racing enthusiast, Briggs Cunningham, who encouraged Fitch to start the 1951 season racing in Argentina.

In 1950, Fitch raced his Ford Flathead engined Fiat 1100, which he soon modified into the "Fitch Model B", and ended the year by driving a Jaguar XK120 in the Sebring Grand Prix of Endurance Six Hours. In 1951, in addition to campaigning in his Fitch-Whitmore, he boosted his early reputation by winning the Gran Premio de Eva Duarte Perón – Sport in his Allard-Cadillac J2. As a result of that win, Juan Perón generously awarded him membership in the Justicialist Party, whilst the trophy and a kiss were given by Eva Perón. He also clinched the support of Cunningham, whose financial clout allowed Fitch to race. He drove a Cunningham C-2R for the Cunningham team at several races, including the 1951 24 Hours of Le Mans, scoring a number of impressive victories in the early '50s at then-fledgling road courses like Elkhart Lake and Watkins Glen, and was crowned the first SCCA National Sports Car Champion. In 1951, John raced an Effyh Formula Three car, winning at Bridgehampton and a class win at Giants Despair.

In 1952, Fitch continued to race the Fitch-Whitmore as well as a Chrysler-engined Cunningham C4-R for the Cunningham team at several races (once again including Le Mans), a works Sunbeam at the Alpine Rally. Seven years after shooting at Germans, he was racing their cars - a Porsche 356 at a race at the legendary Nürburgring, and a Mercedes-Benz 300 SL prototype in the Carrera Panamericana. It was at Le Mans that Fitch came close to making Cunningham's dream of an all-American Le Mans victory come true, when, after setting the fastest lap in his C4-R, he was forced to retire late in the race as a result of 'bad fuel'. During the race, Fitch was impressed by the new Mercedes-Benz 300 SLs, while Mercedes' team chief engineer, Rudolf Uhlenhaut, who was impressed by Fitch's performance, offered Fitch the opportunity to test the car at Nürburgring. Advised by Mercedes's team manager, Alfred Neubauer, to take it easy, Fitch's agenda was more aggressive as he saw this as an audition to join the Daimler outfit. He drove his allotted two laps as if his career depended on it. Neubauer's response was to have Fitch do one more lap to prove they weren't flukes. Fitch shaved a few seconds off his previous lap and the session ended with the proverbial, "We'll be in touch if something comes up." He decided to make "something" happen, and persuaded Neubauer to send a team of 300 SLs to Mexico for the Carrera Panamaricana, a race that the German team weren't going to enter. Fitch's persistence won, and he was invited to Mexico City to pilot one of the team's trio of cars and drivers Hermann Lang and Karl Kling, two coupes of the Germans and a new, but untried, roadster for Fitch. Fitch's car kept throwing the treads off its tyres and he also experienced a high-speed blowout that took out one of the shock absorber mounts, which affected the front suspension. With Kling and Lang finishing first and second, putting Mercedes-Benz back on the map in North America, as for Fitch, the repairs on his car were illegal and he was disqualified. He may not have won the race, but he did win Nuebauer's respect.

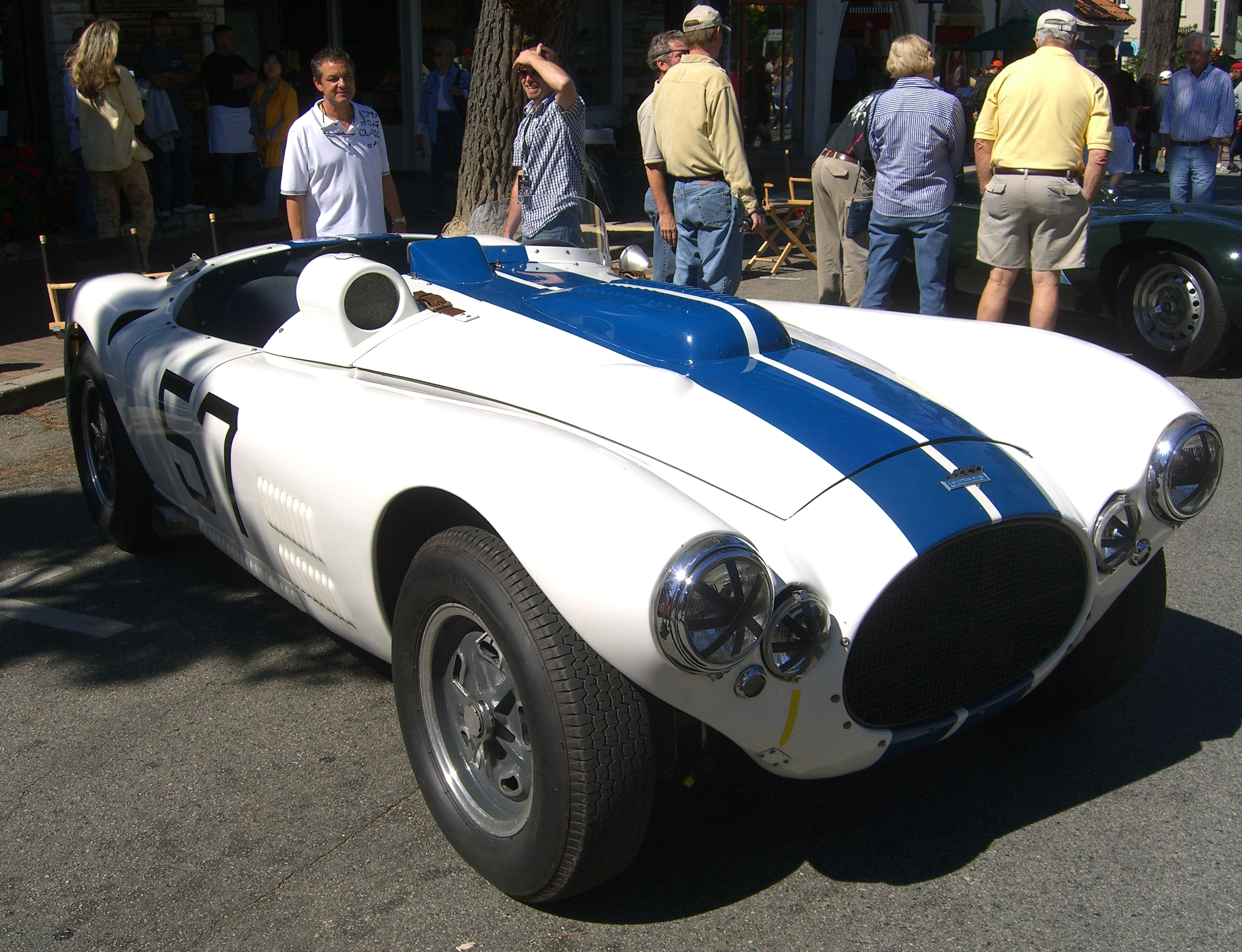
Cunningham-Chrysler C4-R in which Fitch won the 1953 12 Hours of Sebring with Phil Walters.

In his most notable year, 1953, Fitch and co-driver Phil Walters defeated the powerful Aston Martin team in the 12 Hours of Sebring, in a Chrysler-powered Cunningham C4R, much to the surprise of the English team's manager, John Wyer. He thought he had the race won, "I never imagined anyone would beat us. Especially not Americans." It was the first Sebring victory for American drivers in an American car. Fitch competed in many European races that year and was named "Sports Car Driver of the Year" by Speed Age magazine. In addition to again racing a Cunningham C4R and Cunningham C5R for the Cunningham team, competing in European rallies in a Sunbeam-Talbot for the Sunbeam team, and racing a Porsche 356 at Nürburgring, he also competed in the Mille Miglia in a Nash-Healey for the factory team, the Aix-les-Bains Grand Prix in a Cooper Monaco for the Cooper team, the RAC Tourist Trophy race in a works Frazer Nash, then made the first of two starts in World Championship Grand Prix, failing to finish the Gran Premio d'Italia in a HWM-Alta at Monza, and took his rookie test for the Indy 500 in a Kurtis-Kraft-Offenhauser but did not qualify for the race. However, whilst racing a Cunningham C5R, Fitch survived a frightening 140-mph, end-over-end crash during the 12 Heures internationales de Reims.

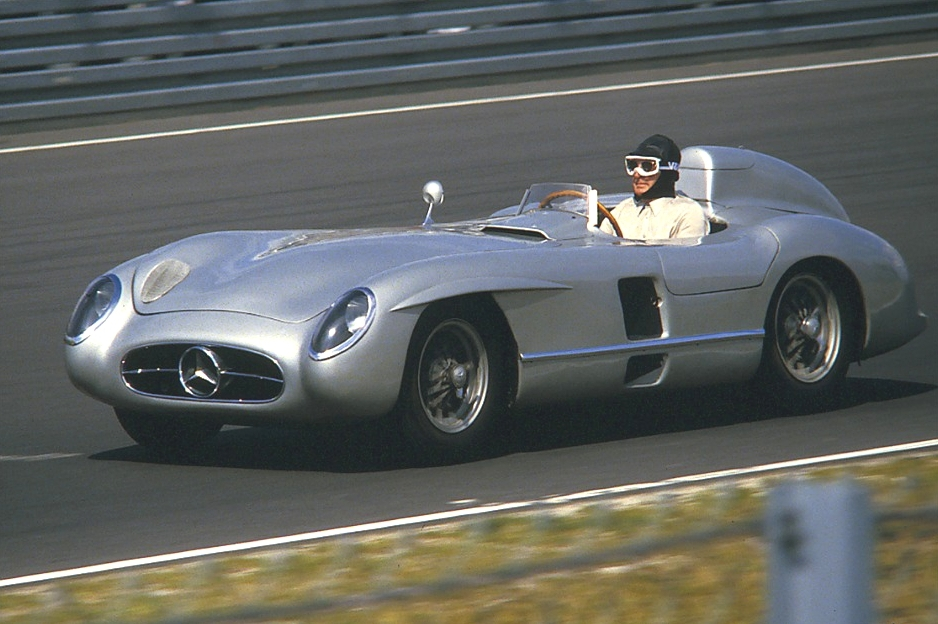
A Mercedes-Benz 300 SLR, similar to that Fitch drove in 1955

In 1954, Fitch drove for Cunningham in a Cunningham C4R, and also Ferraris, and again a Mercedes-Benz 300 SL. For 1955, Fitch raced for the Daimler-Benz AG sports-car team alongside Juan Manuel Fangio, Karl Kling, and Stirling Moss, arguably the most formidable racing team ever, dominating all levels of competition from Formula One to diesel-engined production cars. That year, Fitch won the Gran Turismo oltre 1300 class in the Mille Miglia in at the wheel of a stock production Mercedes-Benz 300 SL, coming in fifth overall behind his team-mates Moss and Fangio in their Mercedes-Benz 300 SLR racers. Fitch reported that the suspension was so bad, "we had to stop and tie down the axle with our belts." Yet he was only beaten by dedicated race cars. Fitch also played a hand in Moss's victory, when he conceived and built the famous "scrolling map in a box" device use by Moss's navigator Denis Jenkinson, to guide their 300 SLR through the treacherous course. Later that season, he partnered with Moss to win the RAC Tourist Trophy at the Dundrod Circuit, in Northern Ireland. He found the narrow circuit to be dangerous and unfit for motor racing, as did other drivers; and the Tourist Trophy moved to the Goodwood Circuit in England. Meanwhile, he took ninth in his final World Championship Grand Prix at Monza, driving a Maserati 250F in the Gran Premio d'Italia.

Prior to Tourist Trophy, Fitch was paired with Pierre Levegh in a 300 SLR, at the Le Mans. It was Levegh driving at the time of the worst accident in racing, killing 83 spectators, and, in the initial confusion, had Fitch's family in the United States notified he had crashed. At the time of the accident, Fitch was in the Mercedes trailer after a coffee with Madame Levegh, just behind the pits. When they heard the explosion, Fitch told Madame Levegh, "Wait here, I'll see what's happened." Finding everything in chaos, he helped some injured gendarmes and journalists. Then he returned to the trailer. "I suppose my grim face must have told it all, for I didn't have to speak. Madame Levegh nodded slowly. 'I know, Fitch. It was Pierre. He is dead. I know he is dead.'" The incident sparked his lifelong interest in safety innovations for racing and highways.

When he returned from racing in Europe at the end of the '55 season, Fitch was chosen by Chevrolet Chief Engineer Ed Cole to head the new eight-driver Chevrolet Corvette racing team for two years. Although the Corvette was at that point widely panned in the racing community as more style than substance, under Fitch's management the year began with setting a class land speed record for production cars at Daytona Beach of 145.543 mph, followed by two class wins and a team win at Sebring. During this period, Fitch continued to race successfully with the Cunningham team, which was now competing around the United States in Jaguar D-Types. He was both team manager and driver for the appearance of the Corvette SS at the 1957 12 Hours of Sebring. By the end of 1957, Fitch had begun racing in Maseratis, which he continued to race in 1958, mostly at the new Lime Rock Park, where he had been instrumental in the promotion of the track and where he was circuit director.

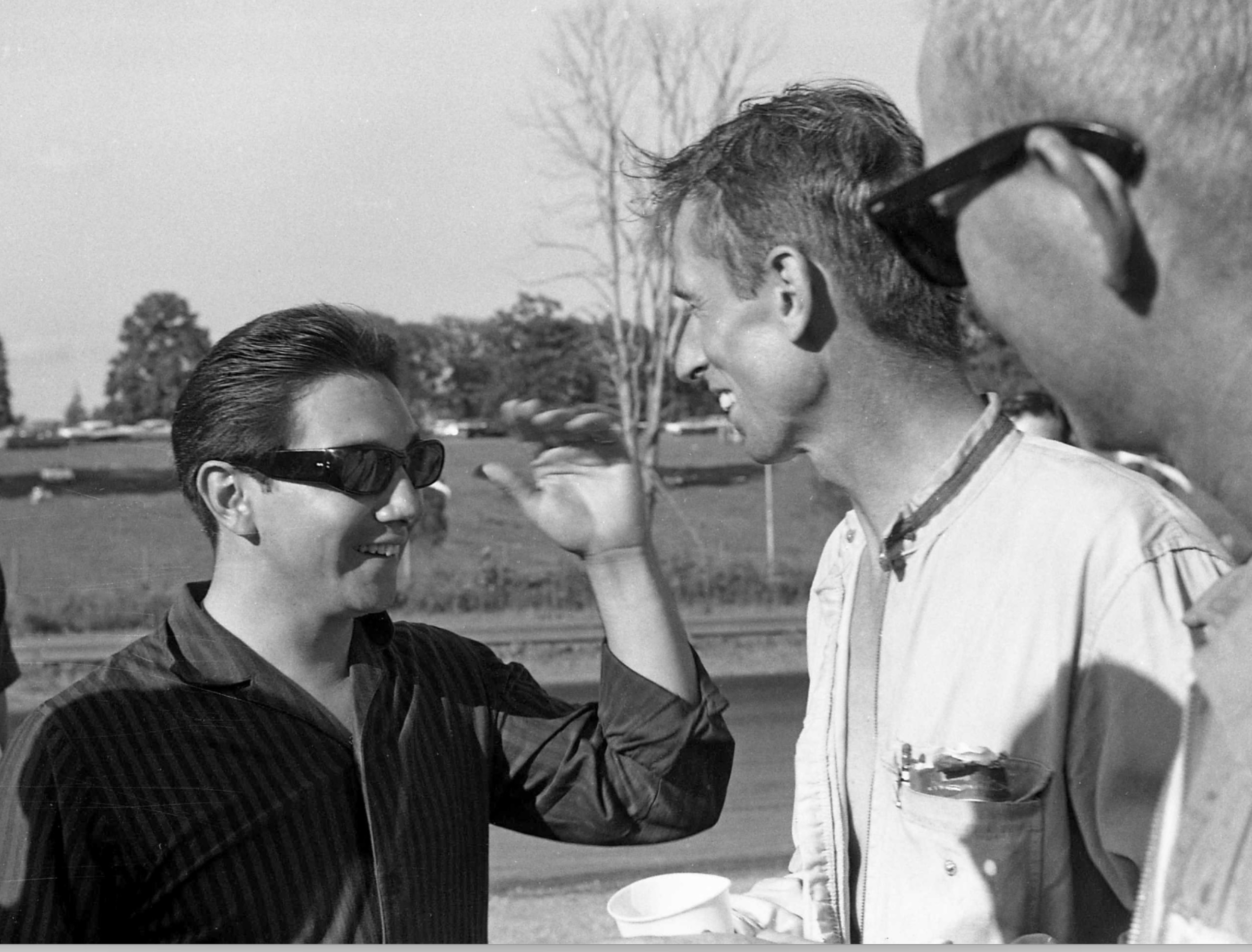
John Fitch, center, with Pedro Rodriguez and Chuck Daigh Lime Rock Formula Libre 1959

In 1959, Fitch drove a factory Porsche 718 RSK in the 12 Hours of Sebring, sharing with Edgar Barth to second in class and fifth place overall. He continued to race with his friend Briggs Cunningham in his Jaguar D-Type and Lister Jaguar, along with the Stingray Racer for Chevrolet's Bill Mitchell, and a Cooper Monaco. It was in his role as circuit director at Lime Rock that he organized and drove in the famous Formula Libre race, where Rodger Ward shocked the expensive and exotic sports cars by beating them on an Offenhauser-powered midget car, normally considered only to be competitive on oval tracks.

In 1960, Fitch re-joined the Briggs Cunningham team to race once again at Le Mans. The Cunningham-prepared Corvettes had been tested and refined at Bridgehampton, then raced in the 12 Hours of Sebring. With Bob Grossman as co-driver, the production Corvette of the Cunningham team placed first in Grand Touring 5000 class (and eighth overall) at Le Mans, a Corvette record which stood for over 40 years.

After that, Fitch and Cunningham teamed up to race a two-litre Maserati at endurance events at Sebring and Road America through 1961, and a Jaguar E-Type at Sebring in 1962 and again in 1963. Fitch also raced a Genie BMC in 1963, then returned to Cunningham to drive a Porsche 904 at Sebring in 1965 and 1966. The poignant tale of his last race begins at the 1966 Sebring event. Fitch, Cunningham, and Dave Jordan were sharing a Porsche. Well into the race, a valve broke and the car was out of contention. By this time, Fitch and Cunningham were no longer enthusiastic about competing to win; according to Fitch, "The thought that this would be our last race never occurred to us. There was a feeling, though, that we weren't really planning to win. In the past, we usually tried to work out a strategy to win, but not this time. I think we were there because we just liked to drive. And at Sebring we could, for 12 hours! Besides, it was the best place to watch the race." So, when a valve broke on the car in 1966, it marked the end of their racing careers for both of them.

Fitch continued to drive in vintage racing events, particularly at Lime Rock Park, as well as at Goodwood Festival of Speed and the Monterey Historic Automobile Races.

Fitch did, however, return to official automotive competition at 87 years of age in 2003 and again in 2005, when he was once again teamed up with a now 50-year-old Mercedes-Benz 300 SLR owned by Bob Sirna, this time at Bonneville Salt Flats in an attempt to break the land speed record for the class, a novel venue for both car and driver. The attempts failed due to the fuel injection pump which limited the top speed to only 150 mph, but the team vowed to return the next year. With characteristic self-deprecating humour, Fitch noted that he had driven those cars faster than that in the rain, at night, on a road with 60 other cars. The extraordinary event is documented in a film by Chris Szwedo entitled A Gullwing at Twilight: The Bonneville Ride of John Fitch. For few years earlier, Fitch did set a speed record – for driving backwards, reaching 60 mph, set at Lime Rock.

== Engineering ==
=== Car design ===
==== Racing specials ====
Fitch designed a total of five cars.

In 1950, Fitch built and raced a Fiat 1100 with the small (60 horsepower) Ford Flathead engine tuned for midget racing, which he soon modified into the "Fitch Model B" by adding a Crosley body. In 1951, in addition to campaigning in the Fitch-Whitmore, a Jaguar XK120 to which he had fit a lightweight aluminium body, saving 800 pounds. John won the Gran Premio de Eva Duarte Perón – Sport in a Cadillac-powered Allard J2, he had rebuilt from a wreck. For 1952, Fitch continued to race his Fitch-Whitmore in addition to other cars.

==== Fitch Sprint ====
As a road-racer, Fitch was particularly interested in the Chevrolet Corvair as the basis for a spirited road and track oriented car due to its handling, while others concentrated more on the Ford Falcon or Ford Mustang with the potential for more power. His Fitch Sprint had only minor modifications to the engine, bringing it to 155 hp (116 kW), but upgrades to the shock absorbers and springs, adjustments to the wheel alignment, quicker steering ratio, alloy wheels, metallic brake linings, the obligatory wood-rimmed steering wheel (leather available for an additional $9.95) and other such minor alterations made it extremely competitive with European sports cars costing much more. Body options such as spoilers were available, but the most visually remarkable option was the "Ventop", a fiberglass overlay for the C-pillars and rear of the roof that gave the car a "flying buttress" profile.

==== Fitch Phoenix ====
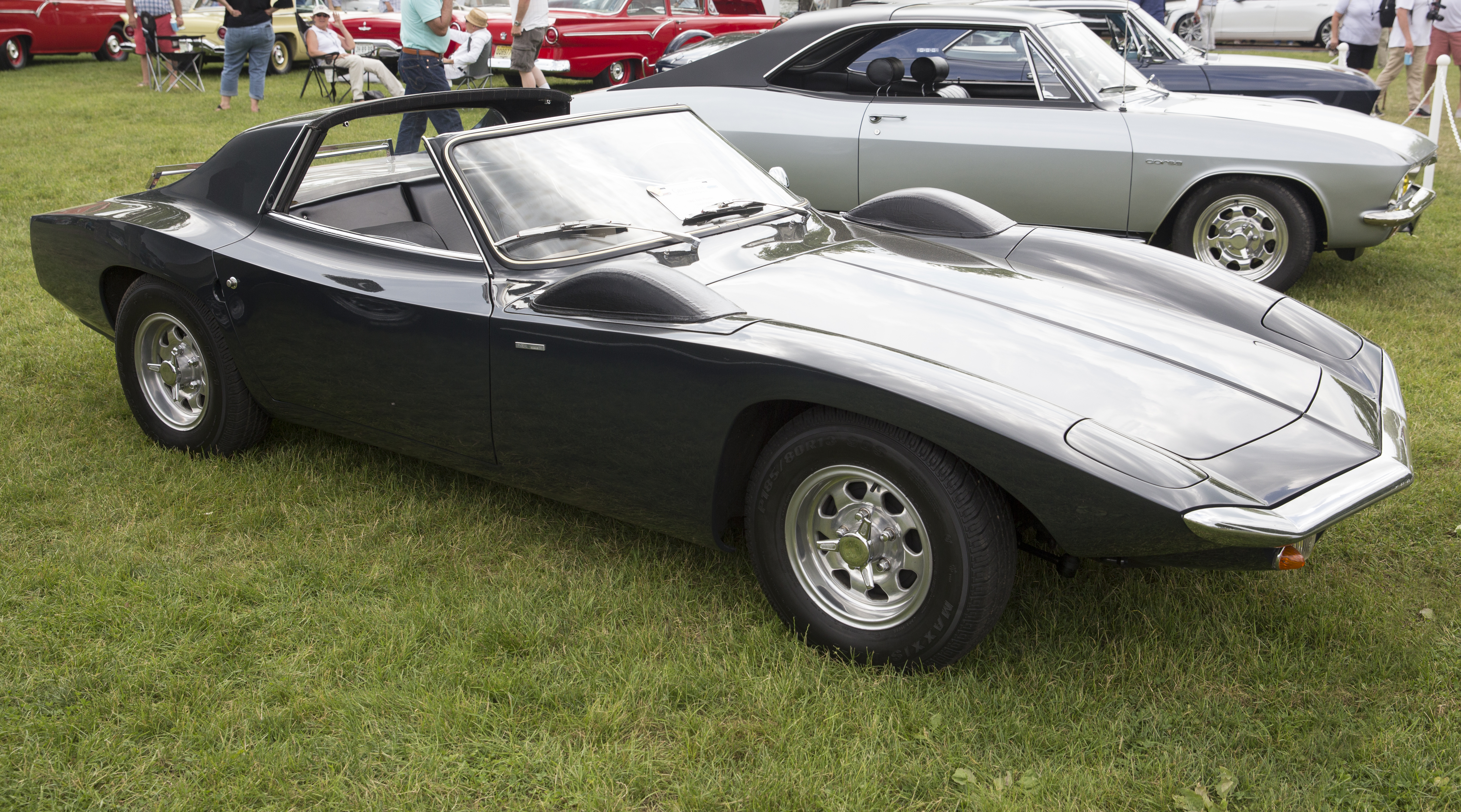
The Fitch Phoenix

Fitch went on to design and build a prototype of the Fitch Phoenix, a Corvair-based two-seat sports car, superficially resembling a Bizzarrini 1900 GT Europa (scaled-down Corvette-based Italian supercar Bizzarrini GT Strada) and a smaller version of the Corvette-based Mako Shark. With a total weight of 1,950 pounds (885 kg), even with a steel body, and with the Corvair engine modified with Weber carburetors to deliver 175 hp (130 kW), the car delivered spirited performance for $8,760. Intermeccanica influence and 1964-1967 Fiat 1500C saloon taillights were also present. Unfortunately, the Traffic Safety Act of 1966 placed restrictions on the ability to produce automobiles on a small scale; this was followed by Chevrolet's decision to terminate production of the Corvair, which confirmed the end of Fitch's plan. He retained the prototype however, and occasionally exhibited it at car shows. It is briefly glimpsed in the film Gullwing at Twilight: The Bonneville Ride of John Fitch, mentioned above. The Fitch Phoenix has a major role in an episode of the Discovery Channel series Chasing Classic Cars hosted by Wayne Carini where he gives it a minor restoration before it going to auction and sells for $230,000.

==== Other cars ====
Fitch's company, John Fitch & Co., Inc., went on to manufacture and market the Fitch Firebird and Toronado Phantom, but garnered less attention than the Sprint.

=== Safety inventions ===
In the aftermath of the Le Mans disaster of 1955, Fitch devoted a great deal of effort to the task of increasing the safety of motorsports and driving in general, resulting in his company, Impact Attenuation Inc. His innovations were characterized not only by their effectiveness, but also by their real-world practicality, as affordable and easily installed and maintained solutions.

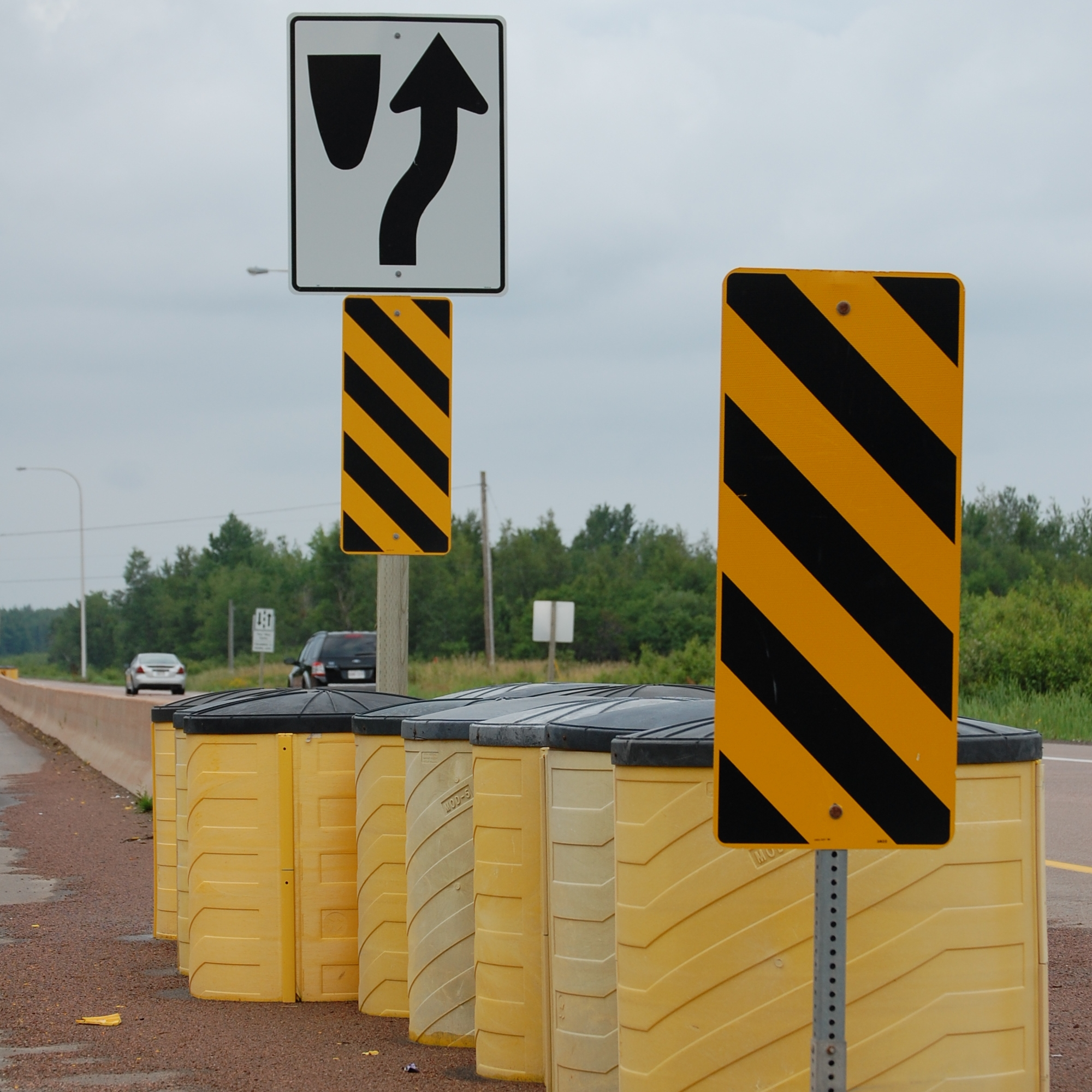
Fitch barrier

Inspired by sand-filled fuel cans which he used to protect his tent from strafing during the war, he devised the Fitch barrier system, now ubiquitous on American highways, for installation around fixed objects on racetracks and highways to absorb impact. Typically, Fitch insisted on testing the system himself. Since first being used in the late 1960s, it is estimated that they have saved as many as 17,000 lives.

Other impact absorbing systems designed by Fitch are the Fitch Compression Barrier, suited for oval tracks and other such high speed situations with little runoff area, which comprises a set of strong, thick-walled resilient elastomer cylinders about a yard in diameter placed between the guardrail and the wall, gently absorbing the vehicle's energy without bouncing it back onto the track, and the Fitch Displaceable Guardrail where more room is available, a guardrail mounted on skids so that it can slide backwards on impact, gradually capturing the car. This reduces the mechanical forces and redirects the car parallel to the wall.

As vehicular modifications for racing safety, Fitch also engineered the Fitch Driver Capsule, an easy to install seat incorporating a seatback which pivots integral with the seatbelt in order to reduce the inertial force experienced by the driver. He later extended the principle with the Fitch Full Driver Capsule, by anchoring the helmet to the seatback to prevent basilar skull fracture and hyperextension of the neck, in a manner similar to the function of the HANS device.

=== Other inventions ===
Fitch also developed other automotive innovations, including the Evans Waterless Engine Cooling System, a propylene glycol based cooling system which does not require pressurization; the DeConti Brake, a liquid-cooled secondary braking system for light trucks, buses and similar vehicles; the Fitch Fuel Catalyst, which reduces the proportion of light chain (C1 – C4) molecules in gasoline, and inhibits oxidation and microorganism growth in both gasoline and diesel fuel; self-leveling automotive suspension systems, for which he received several patents; the Salisbury Thermo-Syphon Fireplace which uses waste heat to provide convective heating; and the Fitch Cervical Spine Traction Therapy, which allows freedom of movement in bed while continuing to provide tension that relieves disk pressure.

Fitch was active in crusading for increased safety on racetracks and highways, joining with medical experts such as Steve Olvey and Terry Trammel, engineers such as Bill Milliken and Karl Ludvigsen, and journalists such as Chris Economaki, Brock Yates and Mike Joy, as well as many of his racing driver friends. He served as consultant to numerous research and governmental organizations on the subject of vehicle handling and dynamics, as they relate to safety.

== Companies ==
During his life, Fitch founded or was associated at a high level with several companies, including John Fitch & Co., Inc., Advanced Power Systems International, Race Safety, Inc., Impact Attenuation, Inc., Impact Dynamics, LLC., Roadway Safety Service Inc., DeConti Industries Inc., Consulier Industries, Inc., Highway Safety Research Corp., as well as Lime Rock Park.

== Career awards ==
In addition to receiving a Presidential Citation, Theater Awards, Air Medals, a Purple Heart, and a POW Medal for his wartime service, Fitch was awarded the Stonex Roadside Safety Award in 1998 and was inducted into the Corvette Hall of Fame (2000) for his contributions to the early Corvette racing team. In addition, Fitch was inducted into the Sebring Hall of Fame (2002), the Sports Car Club of America Hall of Fame (2005), and the Motorsports Hall of Fame of America (2007). In 2009, Fitch became the first full-time sports car driver inducted in the New England Auto Racers Hall of Fame.

In 1998, Fitch received the Kenneth Stonex Award from the Transportation Research Board of the National Academy of Sciences (United States) for his lifelong contributions to road-traffic safety. "In all, John Fitch's achievements in road safety throughout the world have spanned four and one-half decades. His lifetime contributions covered the full spectrum of highway safety – the roadside, the vehicle and the driver. All have resulted in significant reductions in injuries and fatalities on the motorways of the world," said Transportation Research Board committee chairman John F. Carney III on presenting the award.

== Personal life ==
Fitch was an amateur sailor. He was married to his wife Elizabeth until her death in 2009. He resided in Connecticut, near Lime Rock Park.

John and Elizabeth had three sons, John, Christopher (Kip) and Stephen.

Fitch died on October 31, 2012, of Merkel cell carcinoma at his home in Connecticut.

== Racing record ==
=== Career highlights ===
Season	Series	Position	Team	Car
1951	SCCA National Sports Car Championship	1st	Briggs S. Cunningham Bill Spear	Cunningham C-2R; Ferrari 195 S Ferrari 340 America; Jaguar XK120
	Gran Premio de Eva Duarte Perón – Sport	1st		Allard-Cadillac J2
	Elkhart Lake Road Races	1st	Briggs S. Cunningham	Cunningham C-2R
	Miller Trophy	1st	Bill Spear	Ferrari 195 S
	Hoffman Trophy	1st		Jaguar XK120
	Riviera Beach Trophy	1st	Bill Spear	Ferrari 340 America Touring Barchetta
	Sports Car Grand Prix of Watkins Glen	2nd	Briggs S. Cunningham	Cunningham C-2R
1952	200 Miles of Elkhart Lake	1st	B.S. Cunningham	Cunningham C-4R
	Seneca Cup	1st	M. E. Hoffman	Jaguar XK120C
	4 Hours of Turner	1st	B.S. Cunningham	Cunningham C-4R
	SCCA National Sports Car Championship	5th	Colby Whitmore; Briggs Cunningham; M.E. Hoffman	Jaguar XK120; Cunningham C-4R; Jaguar C-Type
1953	6 Hours of MacDill	1st	B.S. Cunningham	Cunningham C-4R
	Grand Prix, 12 Hours of Sebring	1st	Briggs S. Cunningham	Cunningham C-4R
	King George Cup	1st	Briggs S. Cunningham	Cunningham C-4R
	Orange Empire National Sports Car Races	1st	Briggs S. Cunningham	Cunningham C-4R
	Les 24 Heures du Mans	3rd	Briggs S. Cunningham	Cunningham C-5R
	Rheinland-Pfalz Preis	3rd		Porsche 356
1954	Gov. Dan McCarty Memorial Race	3rd	Cunningham/Momo	Ferrari 250 MM
	SCCA National Sports Car Championship	6th	B. S. Cunningham Co.	Cunningham C-4R; Ferrari 375 MM
1955	RAC Tourist Trophy	1st	Daimler-Benz AG	Mercedes-Benz 300 SLR
1956	Jaguar Trophy Race	1st	Briggs S. Cunningham	Jaguar D-Type
1957	1 H Thompson	1st	Fred Procter	Maserati 150S
	Nassau Memorial Trophy Race	3rd	Vincent Andrus	Maserati 200S

=== Complete Formula One World Championship results ===
(key)

Year	Entrant	Chassis	Engine	1	2	3	4	5	6	7	8	9	WDC	Points
1953	HW Motors Ltd	HWM	Alta Straight-4	ARG	500	NED	BEL	FRA	GBR	GER	SUI	ITA; Ret	NC	0
1955	Stirling Moss Ltd.	Maserati 250F	Maserati Straight-6	ARG	MON	500	BEL	NED	GBR	ITA; 9			NC	0

=== Complete 24 Hours of Le Mans results ===
Year	Team	Co-Drivers	Car	Class	Laps	Pos.	Class Pos.
1951	(United States) B. S. Cunningham	(United States) Phil Walters	Cunningham-Chrysler C2-R	S8.0	223	18th	1st
1952	(United States) B. S. Cunningham	(United States) George Rice	Cunningham-Chrysler C4-R	S8.0		DNF (engine)	
1953	(United States) Briggs Cunningham	(United States) Phil Walters	Cunningham-Chrysler C5-R	S8.0	299	3rd	1st
1954	(United States) Briggs Cunningham	(United States) Phil Walters	Ferrari 375 MM	S5.0	120	DNF (transmission)	
1955	(West Germany) Daimler-Benz AG	(France) Pierre Levegh	Mercedes-Benz 300 SLR	S3.0	32	DNF (fatal accident - Levegh)	
1960	(United States) B. S. Cunningham	(United States) Bob Grossman	Chevrolet Corvette C1	GT5.0	281	8th	1st

=== Complete 12 Hours of Sebring results ===
Year	Team	Co-Drivers	Car	Class	Laps	Pos.	Class Pos.
1952	(United States) B. S. Cunningham	(United States) Phil Walters	Cunningham-Chrysler C4-R	S8.0	0	DNS (withdrawn)	
1953	(United States) Briggs S. Cunningham	(United States) Phil Walters	Cunningham-Chrysler C4-R	S8.0	177	1st	1st
1954	(United States) Briggs S. Cunningham	(United States) Phil Walters	Ferrari 375 MM	S5.0	104	DNF (engine)	
1956	(United States) Raceway Enterprises	(United States) Walt Hansgen	Chevrolet Corvette Special	S8.0	176	9th	1st
1957	(United States) Lindsay Hopkins	(Italy) Piero Taruffi	Chevrolet Corvette SS	S5.0	23	DNF (rear suspension)	
1958	(United States) Harry Kullen	(United States) Ed Hugus	Ferrari 250 TR	S3.0	85	DNF (engine)	
1959	(West Germany) Porsche Auto Co.	(East Germany) Edgar Barth	Porsche 718 RSK	S1.5	181	5th	2nd
1961	(United States) Momo Corporation	(United States) Dick Thompson	Maserati Tipo 61	S3.0		DNF (transmission)	
1962	(United States) Briggs Cunningham	(United States) Briggs Cunningham	Jaguar E-Type	GT4.0	176	14th	1st
1963	(United States) Briggs Cunningham	(United States) Briggs Cunningham	Jaguar E-Type	GT4.0	112	DNF (clutch)	
1965	(United States) Briggs Cunningham	(United States) Briggs Cunningham (United States) Bill Bencker	Porsche 904 GTS	GT2.0	173	20th	4th
1966	(United States) Briggs Cunningham	(United States) Briggs Cunningham (United States) Dave Jordan	Porsche 904 GTS	S2.0	148	DNF (valve spring)	

=== Complete 12 Hours of Reims results ===
Year	Team	Co-Drivers	Car	Class	Laps	Pos.	Class Pos.
1953	(United States) B. S. Cunningham	(United States) Phil Walters	Cunningham-Chrysler C5-R	S+2.0		DNF (accident)	

=== Complete Mille Miglia results ===
Year	Team	Co-Drivers	Car	Class	Pos.	Class Pos.
1953	(United States) Nash Healey Inc.	(United States) Raymond Willday	Nash-Healey Spider	S+2.0	DNF (brakes)	
1955	(West Germany) Daimler Benz AG	(West Germany) Kurt Gesell	Mercedes-Benz 300 SL	GT+1.3	5th	1st

=== Complete Carrera Panamericana results ===
Year	Team	Co-Drivers	Car	Class	Pos.	Class Pos.
1951	(United States) E. Carl Kiekhaefer	(United States) John Fitch / Dick Williams	Chrysler Saratoga Special - Race No. 32	S	DISQ	
1952	(West Germany) Daimler-Benz Aktiengesellschaft	(West Germany) Eugen Gieger	Mercedes-Benz 300 SL SpyderRace No. 6	S	DISQ (illegal repairs)	
1953	(United States) E. Carl Kiekhaefer	(United States) John Fitch /Bob Boile	Chrysler New Yorker Special	S+1.6	DISQ (over time limit)	

=== Complete Monte Carlo Rally results ===
Year	Team	Co-Drivers	Car	Class	Pos.	Class Pos.
1953	(United Kingdom) Rootes Motors	(United Kingdom) Peter Collins (United Kingdom) John Cutts	Sunbeam-Talbot 90		DNF; Gearbox	

=== Indianapolis 500 results ===
Year	Chassis	Engine	Start	Finish	Team
1953	Kurtis Kraft	Offenhauser	DNQ		Verlin Brown

Sporting positions
Preceded by n/a	SCCA National Sports Car Championship champion 1951, inaugural championship	Succeeded by Sherwood Johnston
