= Giants Despair Hillclimb =

Hillclimb in Luzerne County, Pennsylvania

- Location: Laurel Run, Pennsylvania, United States
- Coordinates: 41.221551°N 75.859201°W
- Opened: 1906
- Hill Length: 1 mile (1.6 km)
- Turns: 6
- Hill Record: 35.602s (Mark Aubele, 2026)

The Giants Despair Hillclimb is a hillclimb which was established in 1906 in Laurel Run, Luzerne County, Pennsylvania, United States, just southeast of its border to Wilkes-Barre Township. The contest was first run in conjunction with Wilkes-Barre's centennial celebration. It is the oldest continuing motorsport event in Pennsylvania.

== History and race features ==
Race drivers from across the nation gather annually on East Northampton Street, a road that winds its way through a 1 mile (1.6 km) section of Pennsylvania's steep mountains. Rising 650 feet (200 m), the course reaches grades up to 20% and has six turns—including the 110 degree "Devil's Elbow"— on the way to the top.

The initial race was won in 2 minutes 11.2 seconds.

During its first years, the race was used as a proving ground by the biggest names in the automotive industry. Louis Chevrolet raced the hill in 1909 driving for Buick. He won Event No. 2, Gasoline stock cars, selling from $851 to $1,250 in a time of 2:34.4 sec, his car being the only entry in the class. He is chiefly remembered for an accident: "A Buick with Louis Chevrolet driving, turned turtle on the course and narrowly missed a group of people. Chevrolet was not badly injured."

Bill Milliken drove the AJB/FWD Butterball Special, #111, in 1955 finishing third overall in a time of 63.771 sec.

Carroll Shelby, Roger Penske, and Oscar Koveleski are just a few of the famous drivers that set out to tackle the mile. The hill has been paved many times and the records have been shattered. The current record holder is Mark Aubele, who ran the course in 35.602 seconds in 2026 in a 2012 Wolf GB08. Today, the Hillclimb is run on the second weekend of July and is organized by the Pennsylvania Hillclimb Association (PHA).

== Giants Despair events and past winners ==
Year	Driver	Vehicle	Time	Notes
1906	Hugh N. Harding	English Daimler 35 h.p.	2:11.2 sec R	May 10.
1907	William Wray	Simplex-Peugeot (Motorcycle)	1:40.0 sec	May 30.
1907	Walter C. White	White Steamer (Steam car)	1:49.8 sec	May 30.
1907	J.B. Ryall	Matheson 60 h.p. (Gasoline car)	1:59.2 sec R	May 30.
1908	Willie Haupt	Great Chadwick 6-cylinder	1:38.4 sec R	May 30.
1909	David Bruce-Brown	Benz 120 h.p.	1:31.6 sec R	
1910	Ralph DePalma	Fiat 200 h.p.	1:28.4 sec R	June 14.
1911-1915 No events.
1916	Fred Junk	Chalmers	1:41.0 sec	Oct 7.
1917-1950 No events.
1951	Dellevan Lee	Allard-Cadillac	1:07.5 sec R	May 11/12.
1952	Phil Walters	Cunningham CR-4K	1:02.3 sec R	July 24/26.
1953	Dellevan Lee	Allard J2	1:04.4 sec	July 24.
1954	A. Erwin Goldschmidt	Ferrari 4.5	1:01.26 R	July 24/25.
1955	Duncan Black	Ferrari 4.5 #44	1:02.4 sec	July 22.
1956	Carroll Shelby	GP Ferrari 4.5-liter	58.768 sec R	July 20.
1957	Dr. Louis Winkler	Chevrolet Corvette	58.35 sec R	July 19.
1958	J. Robert Bucher	Allard-Cadillac	1:00.933 sec	July 18/19.
1959	Roger Penske	Porsche RSK	59.1734 sec	July 30/Aug 1.
1960	John Meyer	Meyer Special	57.5 sec R	July 29/31.
1961	John Meyer	Pontiac Spl.	56.576 sec R	July 30.
1962	John Meyer	Meyer Special	55.858 sec R	
1963	Charlie Kurtz	Porsche RS-61	56.3543 sec	July 27.
1964	Hal Keck	A.C. Shelby Cobra 4.7-litre	55.6619 sec R	July 24/25.
1965	Harold Keck	A.C. Shelby Cobra 7-litre	51.9152 sec R	July 24/25.
1966	Oscar Koveleski	Cooper-Chevy	50.336 sec R	July 30.
1967	John Meyer	Cooper-Ford	53.281 sec	July 29.
1968	John Meyer	Lola T70-Chevrolet	49.100 sec R	July 27.
1969	Oscar Koveleski	McLaren Mk6B	47.636 sec R	July 27.
1970	John Meyer	Lola T70	52.524 sec	
1971	Jerry McKown	Caldwell Super Vee	54.391 sec	
1972 Cancelled.
1973	Craig Smith	Cooper-Chevy	51.551 sec	
1974	Don Smith	McLaren Mk8B Chevy	48.455 sec	
1975	Oscar Koveleski	McLaren Mk6B Chevy	45.123 sec R	
1976	Oscar Koveleski	McLaren Mk6B Chevy	45.206 sec	July 17/18.
1977	Oscar Koveleski	McLaren Mk6B Chevy	44.127 sec R	
1978	Jim Willauer	LeGrand 5000	48.661 sec	
1979	Oscar Koveleski	McLaren Mk6B Chevy	46.110 sec	
1980	Robert Oswald Sr.	VW-Kellison	51.185 sec	
1981-1985 No event run.
1986	Tommy Van Scoy	Ralt RT1 Formula Continental	49.666 sec	
1987	George Bowland	LeGrand Formula Continental	49.110 sec	
1988	Jerry Coffee	March Formula Atlantic	45.840 sec	
1989	Tommy Van Scoy	March Formula Atlantic	45.368 sec	
1990	Carl Jones	Open Chevy Sports Racer	49.786 sec	
1991	Jerry Coffee	March Formula Atlantic	45.485 sec	
1992	John Halbing	Chevy Camaro GT-1	43.491 sec R	
1993	John Halbing	Chevy Camaro GT-1	43.919 sec	
1994	John Halbing	Chevy Camaro GT-1	42.632 sec R	
1995	Jerry Kieft	The Bandit S2	44.308 sec	
1996	John Halbing	Chevy Camaro GT-1	45.213 sec	
1997	Ron Moreck	Formula Reynard S3	43.320 sec	
1998	Ron Moreck	Formula Reynard S3	43.784 sec	
1999	Ron Moreck	Formula Reynard S3	43.259 sec	
2000	Ron Moreck	Formula Reynard S3	43.595 sec	
2001	Ron Moreck	Formula Reynard S3	39.914 sec R	
2002	Ron Moreck	Formula Reynard S3	40.865 sec	
2003	Barry Griffith	Swift Formula Continental	44.743 sec	
2004	Mark Mashburn	Chevy Camaro GT-1	44.309 sec	
2005	Darryl Danko	Swift Formula Atlantic	43.559 sec	
2006	Darryl Danko	Lola TB900 Special 3	39.000 sec R	July 7–9.
2007	Darryl Danko	Lola TB900 Special 3	38.360 sec R	
2008	Darryl Danko	Lola TB900 Special 3	40.047 sec	
2009	Darryl Danko	Lola TB900 Special 3	41.157 sec	
2010	George Bowland	BBR Shark	40.917 sec	July 11/12.
2011	Darryl Danko	Gurney Eagle	42.187	July 9/10
2012	Darrly Danko	Lola TB900 Special 3	40.100	July 14/15
2013	John Burke	1997 Reynard Champ Car	39.672 sec	July 13/14.
2014	John Burke	1997 Reynard Champ Car	38.024 sec R	July 12/13.
2015	John Burke	1997 Reynard Champ Car	38.277 sec	July 11/12.
2016	John Burke	1997 Reynard Champ Car	38.583 sec	July 9/10.
2017	John Burke	1997 Reynard Champ Car	39.241 sec	July 8/9
2018	Darryl Danko	1998 Reynard Car	42.702 sec	July 7/8
2019	Bob Gardner	2006 Stohr	41.709 sec	July 6/7
2020 Event Cancelled due to COVID-19.
2021	George Bowland	2003 BBR Shark SR1	42.093 sec	July 10/11
2022	Mark Aubele	2003 Ford Mustang LS Swap	41.718 sec	July 9/10
2023	Ron Moreck	Koenigsegg FTF	40.167 sec	July 8/9
2024	Heikki Rinta-Koski	2013 Radical SR8	39.695 sec	July 13/14
2025	Ron Moreck	Koenigsegg FTF	37.692 sec R	July 12/13
2026	Mark Aubele	2012 Wolf GB08	35.602 sec R	July 11/12

Key: R = Course Record.

== See also ==
- Hillclimbing in the USA
- Mount Washington Hillclimb Auto Race
- Sports Car Club of America
