= Monterey SportsCar Championship =

Sports car race in Monterey, California

IMSA WeatherTech SportsCar Championship
- Venue: WeatherTech Raceway Laguna Seca
- Corporate sponsor: Motul
- First race: 1950
- First USCC race: 2014
- Duration: 2 hour 40 minutes
- Previous names: IMSA Monterey Grand Prix; Pebble Beach Road Races; Monterey Triple Crown; Monterey Sports Car Championships; American Le Mans Monterey; America's Tire 250; Motul Course de Monterey
- Most wins (driver): 5 drivers tied (3)
- Most wins (team): Audi Sport North America (6)
- Most wins (manufacturer): Porsche (10)

The Monterey SportsCar Championship is a sports car race held annually at WeatherTech Raceway Laguna Seca by the International Motor Sports Association (IMSA). The event began in 1950 as a race on the roads of Pebble Beach, California. In 1951, it was added to the new SCCA National Sports Car Championship. When Laguna Seca Raceway was built in 1957, the races moved there. The event fell dormant after the National Championship was discontinued in 1957, but was revived by the SCCA's new United States Road Racing Championship in 1963. The race fell dormant again in 1969, and was revived in 1973 with the IMSA GT Championship.

Between 1999 and 2013 the event was a part of the American Le Mans Series, until the series merged with the Rolex Sports Car Series in 2014 to form the United SportsCar Championship.

== Pebble Beach ==
Year	Drivers	Team	Car	Duration/Distance	Race title	Report
Non-Championship
1950	(United States) Phil Hill	(United States) Phil Hill	Jaguar XK120 M	100 miles (160 km)	Pebble Beach Road Race	report
SCCA National Sports Car Championship
1951	(United States) Bill Pollack	(United States) Tom Carstens	Allard 2J-Cadillac	100 miles (160 km)	Pebble Beach Cup	report
1952	(United States) Bill Pollack	(United States) Tom Carstens	Allard 2J-Cadillac	100 miles (160 km)	Del Monte Trophy	report
1953	(United States) Phil Hill	(United States) Phil Hill	Ferrari 250 MM Vignale Spyder Series I	100 miles (160 km)	Del Monte Trophy	report
1954	(United States) Sterling Edwards		Ferrari 340 MM	100 miles (160 km)	Del Monte Trophy	report
1955	(United States) Phil Hill		Ferrari 750 Monza	100 miles (160 km)	Del Monte Trophy	report
1956	(United States) Carroll Shelby	(United States) Dick Hall	Ferrari 750 Monza Scaglietti	100 miles (160 km)	Del Monte Trophy	report

== Laguna Seca ==
Year	Drivers	Team	Car	Duration/Distance	Race title	Report
SCCA National Sports Car Championship
1957	(United States) Pete Lovely	(United States) Fred Armbruster	Ferrari 500 TR		Pebble Beach Races	report
1958 — 1962	Not held					
United States Road Racing Championship
1963	(United States) Chuck Parsons	(United States) Chuck Parsons	Lotus 23-Ford	150 miles (240 km)	Laguna Seca 150	report
1964	(United States) Jim Hall	(United States) Chaparral Cars	Chaparral 2A-Chevrolet	150 miles (240 km)		report
1965	(United States) Jim Hall	(United States) Chaparral Cars	Chaparral 2A-Chevrolet	150 miles (240 km)		report
1966	(United States) Charlie Hayes		McLaren Elva Mark II-Chevrolet	150 miles (240 km)	Monterey 150	report
1967	(United States) Lothar Motschenbacher		McLaren Elva Mark II-Chevrolet	250 km (160 mi)		report
1968	(United States) Mark Donohue	(United States) Roger Penske	McLaren M6A-Chevrolet	150 miles (240 km)	Pimm's Cup Trophy	report
1969 — 1973	Not held					
IMSA GT Championship
1974^{1}	(United States) Elliot Forbes-Robinson	(United States) F.A.R. West Racing	Porsche Carrera	100 miles (160 km)	Monterey Triple Crown	report
1974^{1}	(United States) Milt Minter	(United States) Toad Hall Motor Racing	Porsche Carrera RSR	100 miles (160 km)	Monterey Triple Crown	report
1975^{1}	(United States) Peter Gregg	(United States) Brumos Porsche	Porsche Carrera RSR	100 miles (160 km)	Monterey Triple Crown	report
1975^{1}	(West Germany) Hans-Joachim Stuck	(West Germany) BMW Motorsport	BMW 3.0 CSL	100 miles (160 km)	Monterey Triple Crown	report
1976^{2}	(United States) Al Holbert	(United States) Holbert/Dickinson Racing	Chevrolet Monza	100 miles (160 km)	Monterey Triple Crown	report
1977^{2}	(United States) Danny Ongais	(United States) Interscope Racing	Porsche 934	100 miles (160 km)	Monterey Triple Crown	report
1978	(United States) George Follmer	(United States) Vasek Polak	Porsche 935/77A	100 miles (160 km)	Monterey Triple Crown	report
1979	(United States) Peter Gregg	(United States) Brumos Porsche	Porsche 935/79	100 miles (160 km)	Winston GT Monterey Triple Crown	report
1980	(United Kingdom) John Fitzpatrick	(United States) Dick Barbour Racing	Porsche 935 K3	100 miles (160 km)	Datsun Monterey Triple Crown	report
1981	(United Kingdom) Brian Redman	(United States) Cooke Woods/Garretson	Lola T600-Chevrolet	100 miles (160 km)	Datsun Monterey Triple Crown	report
1982	(United States) John Paul Jr.	(United States) Holbert Racing	Lola T600-Chevrolet	100 miles (160 km)	Datsun Monterey Triple Crown	report
1983	(United States) Al Holbert	(United States) Holbert Racing	March 83G-Chevrolet	100 miles (160 km)	Monterey Triple Crown	report
1984	(United States) Randy Lanier	(United States) Blue Thunder Racing	March 83G-Chevrolet	100 miles (160 km)	Red Lobster Monterey Triple Crown	report
1985	(United States) Al Holbert	(United States) Holbert Racing	Porsche 962	300 km (190 mi)	22nd Annual Nissan Monterey Triple Crown	report
1986	(West Germany) Klaus Ludwig	(United States) Zakspeed USA	Ford Mustang Probe GTP	300 km (190 mi)	Monterey Triple Crown	report
1987	(West Germany) Klaus Ludwig	(United States) Bayside Disposal Racing	Porsche 962	300 km (190 mi)	Nissan Monterey Triple Crown	report
1988	Not held					
1989	(West Germany) Hans-Joachim Stuck	(United States) Audi of America	Audi 90 Quattro	1 Hour	Toyota Monterey Grand Prix	report
1990	Not held					
1991	(United States) Davy Jones	(United States) Bud Light/Jaguar Racing	Jaguar XJR-16	300 km (190 mi)	Grand Auto Supply Monterey Camel GT	report
1992	(Argentina) Juan Manuel Fangio II	(United States) All American Racers	Eagle Mk III-Toyota	2 Hours	Grand Auto Supply Monterey Camel GT	report
1993	(United States) P. J. Jones	(United States) All American Racers	Eagle Mk III-Toyota	1 Hour, 45 Minutes	Monterey Camel GT	report
1994	(United States) Andy Evans (Spain) Fermín Vélez	(United States) Team Scandia	Ferrari 333 SP	2 Hours	Monterey Sports Car Grand Prix	report
1995–1996	Not held					
1997	(United States) John Paul Jr. (United States) Butch Leitzinger	(United States) Dyson Racing	Riley & Scott Mk III-Ford	1 Hour, 45 Minutes	VISA Sports Car Championships	report
1998	(United States) Bill Auberlen (Belgium) Didier de Radigues	(Germany) BMW Motorsport	Riley & Scott Mk III-BMW	2 Hours, 30 Minutes	VISA Sports Car Championships	report
American Le Mans Series
1999	(Finland) JJ Lehto (United Kingdom) Steve Soper	(Germany) BMW Motorsport	BMW V12 LMR	2 Hours, 45 Minutes	VISA Sports Car Championships presented by Honda	report
2000	(Italy) Rinaldo Capello (United Kingdom) Allan McNish	(Germany) Audi Sport North America	Audi R8	2 Hours, 45 Minutes	Globalcenter Monterey Sports Car Championships	report
2001	(Germany) Frank Biela (Italy) Emanuele Pirro	(Germany) Audi Sport North America	Audi R8	2 Hours, 45 Minutes	Monterey Sports Car Championships presented by Mazda	report
2002	(Germany) Frank Biela (Italy) Emanuele Pirro	(Germany) Audi Sport North America	Audi R8	2 Hours, 45 Minutes	Monterey Sports Car Championships	report
2003	(Germany) Marco Werner (Germany) Frank Biela	(Germany) Infineon Team Joest	Audi R8	2 Hours, 45 Minutes	Fry's Electronics Sports Car Championships	report
2004	(United Kingdom) Johnny Herbert (Germany) Pierre Kaffer	(United States) ADT Champion Racing	Audi R8	4 Hours	Audi Sports Car Championships	report
2005	(United Kingdom) Tom Chilton (Japan) Hayanari Shimoda	(United Kingdom) Zytek Engineering	Zytek 04S	4 Hours	Monterey Sports Car Championships	report
2006	(United Kingdom) Allan McNish (Italy) Rinaldo Capello	(United States) Audi Sport North America	Audi R10 TDI	4 Hours	Monterey Sports Car Championships	report
2007	(United Kingdom) Allan McNish (Italy) Rinaldo Capello	(United States) Audi Sport North America	Audi R10 TDI	4 Hours	Monterey Sports Car Championships	report
2008	(Germany) Marco Werner (Germany) Lucas Luhr	(United States) Audi Sport North America	Audi R10 TDI	4 Hours	Monterey Sports Car Championships presented by Patrón	report
2009	(Brazil) Gil de Ferran (France) Simon Pagenaud	(United States) de Ferran Motorsports	Acura ARX-02a	4 Hours	Monterey Sports Car Championships presented by Patrón	report
2010	(Australia) David Brabham (France) Simon Pagenaud (United Kingdom) Marino Franchitti	(United States) Patrón Highcroft Racing	HPD ARX-01C	6 Hours	American Le Mans Series Monterey presented by Patrón	report
2011	(Mexico) Adrián Fernández (Switzerland) Harold Primat (Germany) Stefan Mücke	(United Kingdom) Aston Martin Racing	Lola-Aston Martin B09/60	6 Hours	ModSpace American Le Mans Monterey presented by Patrón	report
2012	(Germany) Klaus Graf (Germany) Lucas Luhr	(United States) Muscle Milk Pickett Racing	HPD ARX-03a	6 Hours	American Le Mans Monterey presented by Patrón	report
2013	(Germany) Klaus Graf (Germany) Lucas Luhr	(United States) Muscle Milk Pickett Racing	HPD ARX-03a	4 Hours	American Le Mans Monterey presented by Patrón	report
IMSA WeatherTech SportsCar Championship
2014^{3}	(Netherlands) Renger van der Zande (Germany) Mirco Schultis	(United States) Starworks Motorsport	Oreca FLM09 Chevrolet	2 Hours (PC, GTD)	Continental Tire Monterey Grand Prix Powered By Mazda	report
2014^{3}	(United States) Johannes van Overbeek (United States) Ed Brown	(United States) Extreme Speed Motorsports	HPD ARX-03b	2 Hours (P, GTLM)	Continental Tire Monterey Grand Prix Powered By Mazda	report
2015	(Canada) Michael Valiante (United Kingdom) Richard Westbrook	(United States) VisitFlorida.com Racing	Corvette DP	2 Hours, 40 Minutes	Continental Tire Monterey Grand Prix Powered By Mazda	report
2016	(Brazil) Oswaldo Negri Jr. (United States) John Pew	(United States) Michael Shank Racing with Curb-Agajanian	Ligier JS P2 Honda	2 Hours (P, GTLM)	Continental Tire Monterey Grand Prix Powered By Mazda	report
2016	(United States) Robert Alon (United Kingdom) Tom Kimber-Smith	(United States) PR1/Mathiasen Motorsports	Oreca FLM09 Chevrolet	2 Hours (PC, GTD)	Continental Tire Monterey Grand Prix Powered By Mazda	report
2017	(Belgium) Marc Goossens (Netherlands) Renger van der Zande	(United States) VisitFlorida.com Racing	Ligier JS P217	2 Hours, 40 Minutes	America's Tire 250	report
2018	(Brazil) Pipo Derani (United States) Johannes van Overbeek	(United States) Tequila Patrón ESM	Nissan Onroak DPi	2 Hours, 40 Minutes	America's Tire 250	report
2019	(United States) Dane Cameron (Colombia) Juan Pablo Montoya	(United States) Acura Team Penske	Acura ARX-05	2 Hours, 40 Minutes	IMSA Monterey Grand Prix	report
2020	(Brazil) Hélio Castroneves (United States) Ricky Taylor	(United States) Acura Team Penske	Acura ARX-05	2 Hours, 40 Minutes	Hyundai Monterey Sports Car Championship	report
2021	(Portugal) Filipe Albuquerque (United States) Ricky Taylor	(United States) Konica Minolta Acura	Acura ARX-05	2 Hours, 40 Minutes	Hyundai Monterey Sports Car Championship	report
2022	(Portugal) Filipe Albuquerque (United States) Ricky Taylor	(United States) Konica Minolta Acura	Acura ARX-05	2 Hours, 40 Minutes	Hyundai Monterey Sports Car Championship	report
2023	(France) Sébastien Bourdais (Netherlands) Renger van der Zande	(United States) Cadillac Racing	Cadillac V-Series.R	2 Hours, 40 Minutes	Motul Course de Monterey Powered by Hyundai N	report
2024	(France) Mathieu Jaminet (United Kingdom) Nick Tandy	(Germany) Porsche Penske Motorsport	Porsche 963	2 Hours, 40 Minutes	Motul Course de Monterey Powered by Hyundai N	report
2025	(Australia) Matt Campbell (France) Mathieu Jaminet	(Germany) Porsche Penske Motorsport	Porsche 963	2 Hours, 40 Minutes	TireRack.com Monterey SportsCar Championship	report
2026	(Netherlands) Tijmen van der Helm (Germany) Laurin Heinrich	(United States) JDC-Miller MotorSports	Porsche 963	2 Hours, 40 Minutes	StubHub Monterey SportsCar Championship	report
^1 Doubleheader events in 1974 and 1975^2 IMSA were also the headlining race at the Monterey Grand Prix in 1976 and 1977^3 Split races in 2014 and 2016
