= Bill Pollack =

American racing driver

- Nationality: American
- Born: July 7, 1925
- Died: July 16, 2017 (aged 92)
- Years active: 1950s
- Wins: Pebble Beach Road Races

Bill Pollack (July 7, 1925 – July 16, 2017) was an American racing driver.

== Racing career ==
Bill Pollack was a competitor in the early days of the post World War II California sports car culture and racing. Bill started his racing career in 1950. He would go on to win at the Pebble Beach Road Races in an Allard J2. The Allard was owned by Tom Carstens'. Bill also won at other California venues of that time: Pebble Beach, Golden Gate Park, Reno, Torrey Pines, Stockton, Madera, Willow Springs, Palm Springs, and the Santa Barbara road races. Bill who was a contemporary of Phil Hill, Carroll Shelby, Ken Miles, Jack McAfee and the other names of that era. Phil Hill, of course, went on to become the first and only U.S. born world grand prix champion.

Bill is also credited with designing the race course at Willow Springs, California, which has been used for racing events, testing and movie shoots, including FORD vs FERRARI.

== World War II years ==
Bill Pollack served in World War II as a B-26 Bomber pilot.

== Published works ==
- Red Wheels and White Sidewalls: Confessions of an Allard Racer (Brown Fox Books, 2004)
