= Sports Car Club of America =

American automobile club

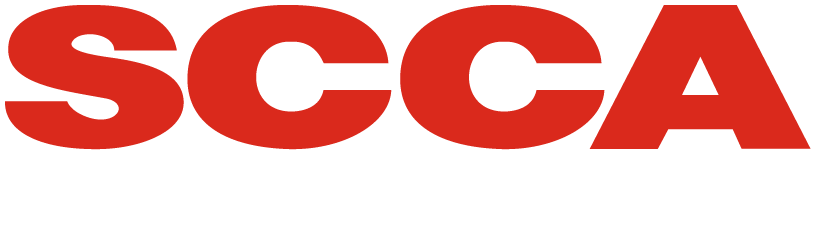
- Sport: Autocross; Rallycross; HPDE; Time Trial; Road racing RoadRally; Hillclimbing in the United States
- Jurisdiction: United States
- Abbreviation: SCCA
- Founded: 1944; 82 years ago
- Headquarters: Topeka, Kansas
- President: Michael Cobb

Official website
- www.scca.com
- (United States)

The Sports Car Club of America (SCCA) is a non-profit American automobile club and sanctioning body supporting Autocross, Rallycross, HPDE, Time Trial, Road Racing, RoadRally, and Hill Climbs in the United States. Formed in 1944, it runs many programs for both amateur and professional racers.

== History ==
The SCCA traces its roots to the Automobile Racing Club of America (not to be confused with the current stock car series of the same name). ARCA was founded in 1933 by brothers Miles and Sam Collier and dissolved in 1941 at the outbreak of World War II. Its former members later regrouped to form the SCCA in 1944, taking on the function that ARCA had performed before the war. The SCCA began sanctioning road racing in 1948 with the inaugural Watkins Glen Grand Prix. Cameron Argetsinger, an SCCA member and local enthusiast who would later become Director of Pro Racing and Executive Director of the SCCA, helped organize the event for the SCCA.

In 1951, the SCCA National Sports Car Championship was formed from existing marquee events around the nation, including Watkins Glen, Pebble Beach, and Elkhart Lake. Many early SCCA events were held on disused air force bases, organized with the help of Air Force General Curtis LeMay, a renowned enthusiast of sports car racing. LeMay loaned out facilities of Strategic Air Command bases for the SCCA's use; the SCCA relied heavily on these venues during the early and mid-1950s during the transition from street racing to permanent circuits.

By 1962, the SCCA was tasked with managing the U.S. World Sportscar Championship rounds at Daytona, Sebring, Bridgehampton and Watkins Glen. The club was also involved in the Formula 1 U.S. Grand Prix. SCCA Executive Director John Bishop helped to create the United States Road Racing Championship series for Group 7 sports cars to recover races that had been taken by rival USAC Road Racing Championship. Bishop was also instrumental in founding the SCCA Trans-Am Series and the SCCA/CASC Can-Am series. In 1969, tension and infighting over Pro Racing's autonomy caused Bishop to resign and help form the International Motor Sports Association.

== Sanctioned Events ==
=== Autocross (Solo) ===
The autocross program is branded as "Solo". Up to four cars at a time run on a course laid out with traffic cones on a large paved surface, such as a parking lot or airport runway, without interfering with one another.

Competitions are held at the regional, divisional, and national levels. A national champion in each class is determined at the national championship (usually referred to as "Nationals") held in September. In 2009, Solo Nationals moved to the Lincoln Airpark in Lincoln, Nebraska. Individual national-level events called "Championship Tours" and "Match Tours" are held throughout the racing season. The SCCA also holds national-level events in an alternate format called "ProSolo". In ProSolo, two cars compete at the same time on mirror-image courses with drag racing-style starts, complete with reaction and 60-foot times. Class winners and other qualifiers (based on time differential against the class winner) then compete in a handicapped elimination round called the "Challenge". Points are awarded in both class and Challenge competition, and an annual champion is crowned each September at the ProSolo Finale event in Lincoln, Nebraska.

=== Rallycross ===
The SCCA sanctions "RallyCross" events, similar to autocross, but on a non-paved course. SCCA ProRally was a national performance rally series similar to the World Rally Championship. At the end of the 2004 season SCCA dropped ProRally and ClubRally. A new organization, Rally America, picked up both series starting in 2005.

Road rallies are run on open, public roads. These are not races in the sense of speed, but of precision and navigation. The object is to drive on time, arriving at checkpoints with the proper amount of elapsed time from the previous checkpoint. Competitors do not know where the checkpoints are.

=== Track Night in America ===
Track Night in America is a track experience program sanctioned by the SCCA. The program is designed to be low barrier to entry, and accepting to all skill levels. Events happen all over the country, on week evenings usually between Tuesday and Thursday. SCCA planned week night track events to keep costs down, as well as build a program that doesn't take over the entrants entire weekend.

TNiA goes to well known tracks like Road America, VIR, even Sebring and Lime Rock. There are also smaller club tracks like CMP, AMP and Pitt Race. TNiA puts on about 150 events a year, totaling nearly 10,000 entrants each year, and as of 2024 has been running for 10 years.

=== Time Trials ===
In recent years, the SCCA has expanded and re-organized some of the higher-speed events under the Time Trials banner. These include Performance Driving Experience ("PDX"), Club Trials, Track Trials, and Hill Climb events. PDX events are non-competition HPDE-type events and consist of driver-education and car control classroom learning combined with on-track instruction.

=== Club Racing ===
The Club Racing program is a road racing division where drivers race on either dedicated race tracks or on temporary street circuits. Competitors require either a regional or a national racing license. Both modified production cars (ranging from lightly modified cars with only extra safety equipment to heavily modified cars that retain only the basic shape of the original vehicle) and designed-from-scratch "formula" and "sports racer" cars can be used in Club Racing. Most of the participants in the Club Racing program are unpaid amateurs, but some go on to professional racing careers. The club is also the source for race workers in all specialties.

The annual national championship for Club Racing is called the SCCA National Championship Runoffs and has been held at Riverside International Raceway (1964, 1966, 1968), Daytona International Speedway (1965, 1967, 1969, 2015), Road Atlanta (1970–1993), Mid-Ohio Sports Car Course (1994–2005, 2016), Heartland Park Topeka (2006–2008), Road America (2009-2013, 2020), Mazda Raceway Laguna Seca (2014), and Indianapolis Motor Speedway (2017). In 2018, the Runoffs will go back west to Sonoma Raceway. In 2019, the race will be held at Virginia International Raceway a track where the race has never been held. It was announced on 15 June 2018 that the Runoffs would go back to Road America in the year 2020. On 25 May 2019, the weekend of the 2019 Indianapolis 500, SCCA announced they will be returning to Indianapolis Motor Speedway in 2021. The current SCCA record holder is Jerry Hansen, (former owner of Brainerd International Raceway), with twenty-seven national championships.

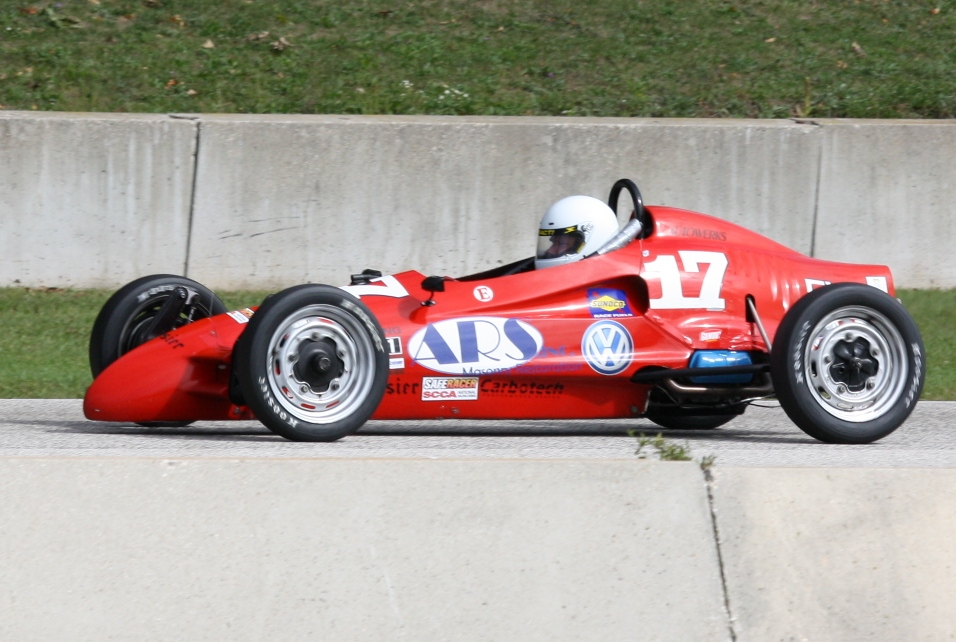
Formula Vee car of Rick Shields

==== SCCA Majors formula group classes ====
The five national classes of the formula group are Formula Atlantic (FA), Formula Continental (FC), Formula Enterprises 2 (FE2), Formula F (FF), and Formula Vee (FV).

=== Professional racing ===
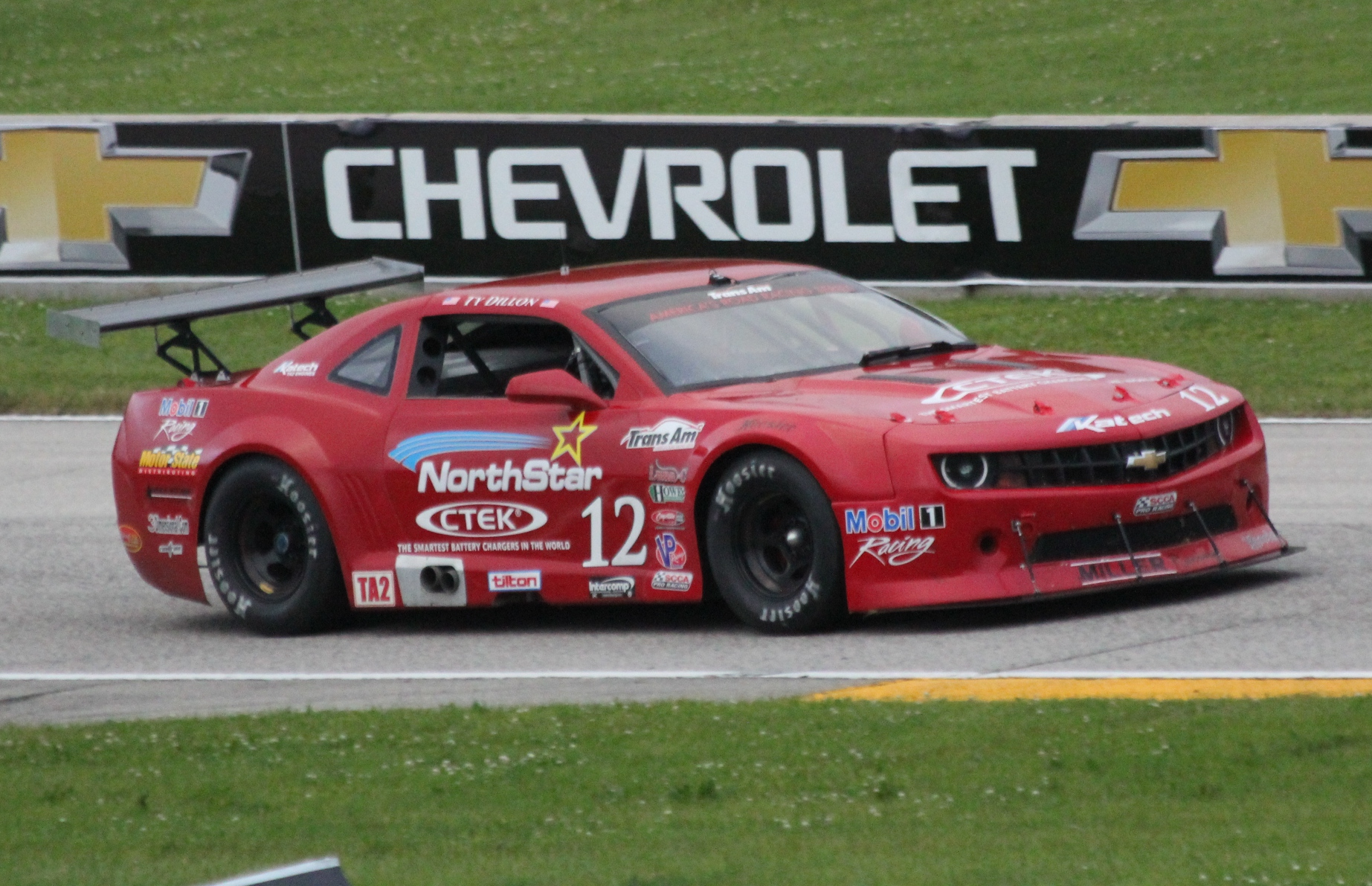
Trans Am car of Ty Dillon

The SCCA dropped its amateur only policy in 1962 and began sanctioning professional racing. In 1963, the United States Road Racing Championship was formed. In 1966 the Canadian-American Challenge Cup (Can-Am) was created for Group 7 open-top sportscars. The Trans-Am Series for pony cars also began in 1966. Today, Trans-Am uses GT-1 class regulations, giving amateur drivers a chance to race professionally. A professional series for open-wheel racing cars was introduced in 1967 as the SCCA Grand Prix Championship. This series was then held under various names through to the 1976 SCCA/USAC Formula 5000 Championship.

Current SCCA-sanctioned series include Trans Am, the GT World Challenge America for GT and touring cars, the Global MX-5 Cup, and the F1600 Championship Series, F2000 Championship Series, and Atlantic Championship Series for open-wheel racing. SCCA Pro Racing has also sanctioned professional series for some amateur classes such as Spec Racer Ford Pro and Formula Enterprises Pro. SCCA Pro Racing also sanctioned the Volkswagen Jetta TDI Cup during its time.

== Conferences, divisions and regions ==
The SCCA is organized into six conferences, nine divisions and 115 regions, each organizing events in that area to make the events more accessible to people throughout the country. The number of divisions has increased since the SCCA's foundation. Northern Pacific and Southern Pacific started as a single Pacific Coast Division until dividing in 1966. Rocky Mountain Division is a relatively recent split. The Great Lakes Division was split from the Central Division at the end of 2006.

SCCA Divisions
Conference	Division	Territory
Northeast	Northeast	Connecticut, Delaware, Maine, Maryland, Massachusetts, New Hampshire, New Jersey, New York, Pennsylvania, Rhode Island, Vermont, and Northern Virginia
Southeast	Southeast	Alabama, Florida, Georgia, North Carolina, South Carolina, Eastern Tennessee, Puerto Rico and Southern Virginia
Northern	Central	Northern Illinois, Minnesota, Eastern Iowa, North Dakota, South Dakota, Upper Peninsula of Michigan and Wisconsin
Northern	Great Lakes	Kentucky, Ohio, Indiana, Lower Peninsula of Michigan, and Southern West Virginia
Mid-States	Midwest Division	Arkansas, Southern Illinois, Western Iowa, Kansas, Northern Mississippi, Missouri, Nebraska, Oklahoma, and Western Tennessee
Mid-States	Rocky Mountain	Colorado, Eastern Montana, New Mexico, Utah, and Wyoming
Southern	Southwest	Louisiana, Texas, and coastal Mississippi
West	Northern Pacific	Alaska, Northern California, Idaho, Western Montana, Northern Nevada, Oregon, and Washington
West	Southern Pacific	Arizona, Southern California, Hawaii, and Nevada

== Awards ==
See footnote

== See also ==
- Hillclimbing in the United States
- United States Auto Club
- Automobile Racing Club of America
- Automobile Association of America
- Automobile Club of America
