= Maserati in motorsport =

Motorsport activities of Maserati

Throughout its history, the Italian auto manufacturer Maserati has participated in various forms of motorsport including Formula One, sportscar racing and touring car racing, both as a works team and through private entrants. Maserati currently competes in Formula E in partnership with the Monaco Sports Group (MSG) as Maserati MSG Racing.

== Beginnings ==
One of the first Maseratis the Tipo 26 driven by Alfieri Maserati with Guerino Bertocchi acting as riding mechanic won the Targa Florio 1,500 cc class in 1926, finishing in ninth place in overall.

Maserati was very successful in pre-war Grand Prix racing using a variety of cars with 4, 6, 8 and 16 cylinders (two straight-eights mounted parallel to one another).

Other notable pre-war successes include winning the Indianapolis 500 twice (1939 and 1940), both times with Wilbur Shaw at the wheel of a 8CTF.

== Sports and GT cars ==
Maserati won the Targa Florio in 1937, 1938, 1939 and 1940. The first two wins were achieved by Giovanni Rocco with a Maserati 6CM and the last two by Luigi Villoresi with a 6CM in 1939 and a 4CL in 1940.

Maserati's post-war factory effort in sports car racing began in 1954 for the second season of the World Sportscar Championship. The factory raced as Officine Alfieri Maserati.

=== World Sports Car Championship ===
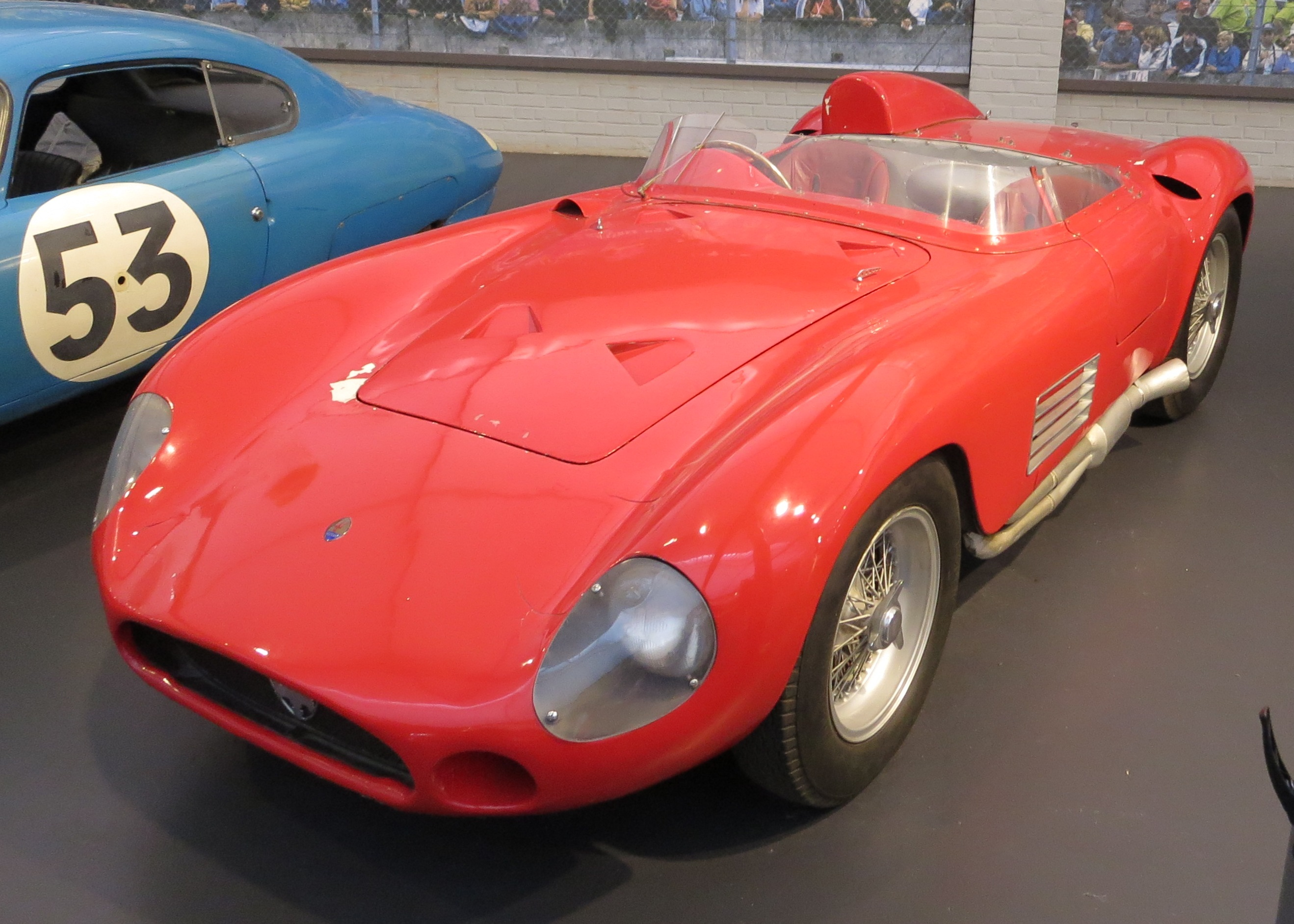
Maserati placed second in the 1956 World Sportscar Championship with the 300S

Maserati scored points in all but one year of the first era of the World Sports Car Championship from 1953 to 1961. Both factory-entered and privately-entered cars were eligible to score points for the manufacturer. At the end of 1957 Maserati retired the factory team from racing though they continued to build cars for privateers.

In the 1953 World Sportscar Championship Maserati placed thirteenth.

In the 1954 World Sportscar Championship Maserati entered the Maserati A6GCS and placed fifth.

In the 1955 World Sportscar Championship Maserati placed fourth.

In the 1956 World Sportscar Championship Maserati placed second including a win at the 1000 km Buenos Aires and the 1000 km at the Nürburgring. The win at 1956 1000 km Buenos Aires was a Maserati 300S sports car driven by Stirling Moss and Carlos Menditéguy.

In the 1957 World Sportscar Championship Maserati again placed second. This time with wins at Sebring and Rabelöfsbanan

In the 1959 World Sportscar Championship Maserati placed fourth.

In the 1960 World Sportscar Championship Maserati placed third. With a win at the ADAC 1000 km Nürburgring for a Maserati Tipo 61 driven by Stirling Moss and Dan Gurney.

In the 1961 World Sportscar Championship Maserati placed second. With a repeat win at the ADAC 1000 km Nürburgring for a Maserati Tipo 61 this time driven by Lloyd Casner and Masten Gregory.

=== FIA GT Championship ===
Maserati returned to sportscar racing in 2004, entering the Maserati MC12 in the FIA GT Championship. Since 2005 the MC12 fielded by Vitaphone Racing Team won five teams' championships and four drivers' championships in a row.

=== FIA GT1 World Championship ===
Michael Bartels and Andrea Bertolini won the inaugural GT1 World Championship for Drivers in the 2010 FIA GT1 World Championship driving a Maserati MC12 for the Vitaphone Racing Team. The Vitaphone Racing Team won the GT1 World Championship for Teams.

=== List of Maserati sports and GT racing cars ===
- Maserati A6GCS Sports Car
- Maserati 350S Sports Car.
- Maserati 300S Sports Car.
- Maserati 250S Sports Car.
- Maserati 200S Sports Car.
- Maserati 150S Sports Car.
- Maserati 450S Sports Car.
- Maserati Tipo 60 Sports Car
- Maserati Tipo 61 the "Birdcage" Sports Car
- Maserati Tipo 63
- Maserati Tipo 64
- Maserati Tipo 65
- Maserati Tipo 151
- Maserati Barchetta Sports Car
- Maserati Ghibli II Open Cup GT Car
- Maserati Trofeo series GT Car.
- Maserati Trofeo Light GT3 Racing Car
- Maserati Trofeo GranSport series GT Car.
- Maserati MC12 GT1 Racing Car
- Maserati GranTurismo GT4
- Maserati GranTurismo GT3
- Maserati MC20 GT2

== Touring cars ==
The Maserati Biturbo Group A racing car competed unsuccessfully in the British Touring Car Championship in the late 1980s, the European Touring Car Championship and the World Touring Car Championship (1987).

The cars for the 1987 World Touring Car Championship season were entered by Pro Team Italia/Imberti. The car was in Group A Division 3 competing against the Ford Sierra RS Cosworth and later in the season Ford Sierra RS 500. The car was driven by Bruno Giacomelli, Armin Hahne, Marcello Gunella, Mario Hytten, Nicola Tesini and Kevin Bartlett.

For the British Touring Car Championship the cars were entered by Trident Motorsport. This was for the 1988 and 1989 seasons. The car was driven by Nick May, John Lepp and Vic Lee.

== Rally cars ==
A former 1987 WTCC car was bought by Adriano Dece who converted it for used on road rallies and the company also manufactured the Maserati Biturbo Group A Rally car.

== Formula One ==
Maserati
- Full name: Officine Alfieri Maserati
- Base: Modena, Italy
- Founder(s): Maserati Brothers
- Noted staff: Gioacchino Colombo; Valerio Colotti
- Noted drivers: (Argentina) Juan Manuel Fangio (United Kingdom) Stirling Moss

Formula One World Championship career
- First entry: 1950 British Grand Prix
- Races entered: 43 (43 starts)
- Constructors' Championships: 0
- Drivers' Championships: 2 (1954, 1957)
- Race victories: 9
- Pole positions: 9
- Fastest laps: 14
- Final entry: 1957 Italian Grand Prix

Maserati as a Formula One chassis constructor
Formula One World Championship career
- First entry: 1950 British Grand Prix
- Last entry: 1960 United States Grand Prix
- Races entered: 77 (70 starts)
- Race victories: 9
- Constructors' Championships: 0
- Drivers' Championships: 2 (1954, 1957)
- Pole positions: 10
- Fastest laps: 15

Maserati as a Formula One engine manufacturer
Formula One World Championship career
- First entry: 1950 British Grand Prix
- Last entry: 1969 Monaco Grand Prix
- Races entered: 113 (108 starts)
- Chassis: Maserati, Arzani-Volpini, Cooper, Kurtis Kraft, JBW, Tec-Mec, Emeryson, Lotus, ENB
- Constructors' Championships: 0
- Drivers' Championships: 2 (1954, 1957)
- Race victories: 11
- Podiums: 44
- Points: 72
- Pole positions: 11
- Fastest laps: 17

Maserati participated in Grand Prix racing during the 1930s and in Formula One motor racing during the 1950s and 1960s. Its works Formula One programme was broadly successful, providing a total of 9 Grand Prix wins for the factory team. In addition, Juan Manuel Fangio won the 1957 World Championship of Drivers and part of the 1954 World Championship of Drivers with a Maserati 250F.

Maserati designed two Formula One cars: the Maserati 4CLT and the Maserati 250F, and the pre-World War II Maserati 4CL was also used with some success. In addition, the Maserati A6GCM, designed as a Formula Two car, was also used in F1. Due to financial difficulties in the late 1950s the team had to withdraw from Formula One in 1958 despite the 250F still being successful. Privateers continued to use the 250F until 1960.

In the 1960s, Maserati supplied engines to British Formula One team Cooper as well as a number of smaller teams. The most successful car of that collaboration was the Cooper-Maserati T81, which had a Maserati V12 engine. It won the 1966 Mexican Grand Prix and the 1967 South African Grand Prix, driven by John Surtees and Pedro Rodríguez respectively.

=== Beginnings of Formula One operation ===
The 1948 Maserati 4CLT was one of the first cars built to the new Formula One regulations, introduced in 1946, and was developed from the 1938 Maserati 4CL voiturette car. The older design was still competitive despite the hiatus of World War II and was entered into Formula One races when racing resumed after the war. Its success encouraged Maserati to develop the car's design and these refinements were brought together as the 4CLT.

== Formula E ==
On 10 January 2022, Maserati announced they would be competing in Formula E beginning in the 2022–23 Formula E World Championship. On 4 June 2023, Maserati took its first Formula E victory with Maximilian Günther in the 2023 Jakarta ePrix - Race 2. Günther also won the first Tokyo ePrix on 30 March 2024.

== Racecars ==
Year	Car	Image	Category
1926	Maserati Tipo 26		Grand Prix
1927	Maserati Tipo 26B		Race car
1929	Maserati Tipo V4		Grand tourer
1930	Maserati Tipo 26M		Grand Prix
1931	Maserati 8C		Grand Prix
1932	Maserati 4CM		Grand Prix
1933	Maserati 8CM		Grand Prix
1935	Maserati V8RI		Grand Prix
1936	Maserati 6CM		Grand Prix
1938	Maserati 8CTF		Grand Prix
1939	Maserati 4CL		Grand Prix
1940	Maserati 8CL		Grand Prix
1947	Maserati Tipo 6CS/46		Grand tourer
1947	Maserati A6GCS		Race car
1948	Maserati 4CLT		Grand Prix
1950	Maserati 8CLT		Formula One
1951	Maserati A6GCM		Formula One
1954	Maserati 250F		Formula One
1954	Maserati 250S		Group 4
1955	Maserati 150S		Group 4
1955	Maserati 200S		Group 4
1955	Maserati 300S		Group 4
1955	Maserati 350S		Group 4
1956	Maserati 450S		Group 4
1958	Maserati 420M/58		Formula One
1959	Maserati Tipo 61		Group 4
1962	Maserati Tipo 151		Group 4
2004	Maserati MC12 GT1		Group GT
2006	Maserati Coupe GranSport Light		Group GT3
2011	Maserati GranTurismo MC		SRO GT4
2016	Maserati GranTurismo MC GT4		SRO GT4
2022	Maserati Tipo Folgore		Formula E
2023	Maserati MC20 GT2		SRO GT2
