= Maserati 8CL =

Open-wheel Grand Prix motor racing car

- Designer(s): Maserati
- Production: 1940-1946
- Predecessor: Maserati 8CTF
- Successor: Maserati 8CLT

Technical specifications
- Chassis: Steel box-section frame, aluminum body
- Suspension (front): Rigid axle, semi-elliptic leaf springs, friction shock absorbers
- Suspension (rear): Live axle, semi-elliptic leaf springs, friction shock absorbers
- Length: 3,830 mm (151 in)
- Width: 1,480 mm (58 in)
- Height: 1,100 mm (43 in)
- Axle track: 1,340–1,350 mm (53–53 in) (front); 13,601,380 mm (535,487 in) (rear)
- Wheelbase: 2,790 mm (110 in)
- Engine: 3.0 L (2,981.7 cc) Straight-8 (415–430 hp (309–321 kW)) FR layout
- Transmission: 4 speed manual transmission
- Weight: 630–780 kg (1,390–1,720 lb)

Competition history

The Maserati 8CL is an open-wheel Grand Prix motor racing car, designed, developed and built by Italian manufacturer Maserati, from 1940 through 1946. Only two models were produced.

== Racing and competitive history ==
Featuring a longer wheelbase, it succeeded the 8CTF. She was conceived to participate in the International Formula. The technical setting that gave positive results with the 4CL was resumed, namely four valves per cylinder, a square engine (i.e. the piston stroke was equal to the cylinder bore), and two compressors, one for each bank of 4 cylinders.

The outbreak of World War II shortly after its launch interrupted its development. The resumption of competitive activities after the conflict relegated supercharged racing cars, and with a large displacement, to free formulas, which however did not interest the public. This was also the fate of 8CL.

Two specimens were built, one before and one after the Second World War: the first was sold in Argentina, while the second was made specifically for the Scuderia Milano and achieved good results with Gigi Villoresi (third classified at the Indianapolis 500 in 1946). and Nino Farina (winner of the Mar del Plata Grand Prix in 1948).

== Design ==
The ignition was single with a Spark magnet. The distribution was with four valves per cylinder arranged in a 90° V, and a double overhead camshaft. Lubrication was forced with delivery and recovery pumps. The cooling system was water circulation with centrifugal pumps.

The engine was supercharged with two Roots-type compressors, one per bank, and two Memini carburetors upstream of the same. It had a displacement of 2,981.7 cc (181.95 cu in), with the bore and stroke both being 78 mm (3.1 in). It was an eight-cylinder in-line, having a compression ratio of 6.5: 1. The power delivered by the engine was between 415 and 430 hp at 6400-6800 rpm.

The brakes were drum brakes on the wheels with hydraulic control. The suspensions were with friction shock absorbers; the front ones were also equipped with torsion bars, while the rear ones were equipped with leaf springs. The steering was a worm screw and toothed sector, while the transmission consisted of a four-speed gearbox plus reverse.

The body design was open-wheel, covered in aluminum, while the chassis was made up of two side members with light-alloy cross members.

The model reached a maximum speed between 280–305 km/h (174–190 mph).

== Technical data ==
Technical data	8CL
Engine:	Front mounted 8-cylinder in-line engine
displacement:	2982 cm³
Bore x stroke:	78 x 78 mm
Max power at rpm:	430 hp at 6 800 rpm
Valve control:	2 overhead camshafts, 4 valves per cylinder
Compression:	6.5:1
Carburetor:	Double Memini MA12
Upload:	Double Roots compressors
Gearbox:	4-speed manual
suspension front:	Double cross links, torsion springs
suspension rear:	Stiff rear axle, torsion springs
Brakes:	Hydraulic drum brakes
Chassis & body:	Box beam frame with aluminum body
Wheelbase:	279 cm
Dry weight:	780 kg
Top speed:	305 km/h
