= Maserati 8CLT =

Open-wheel race car

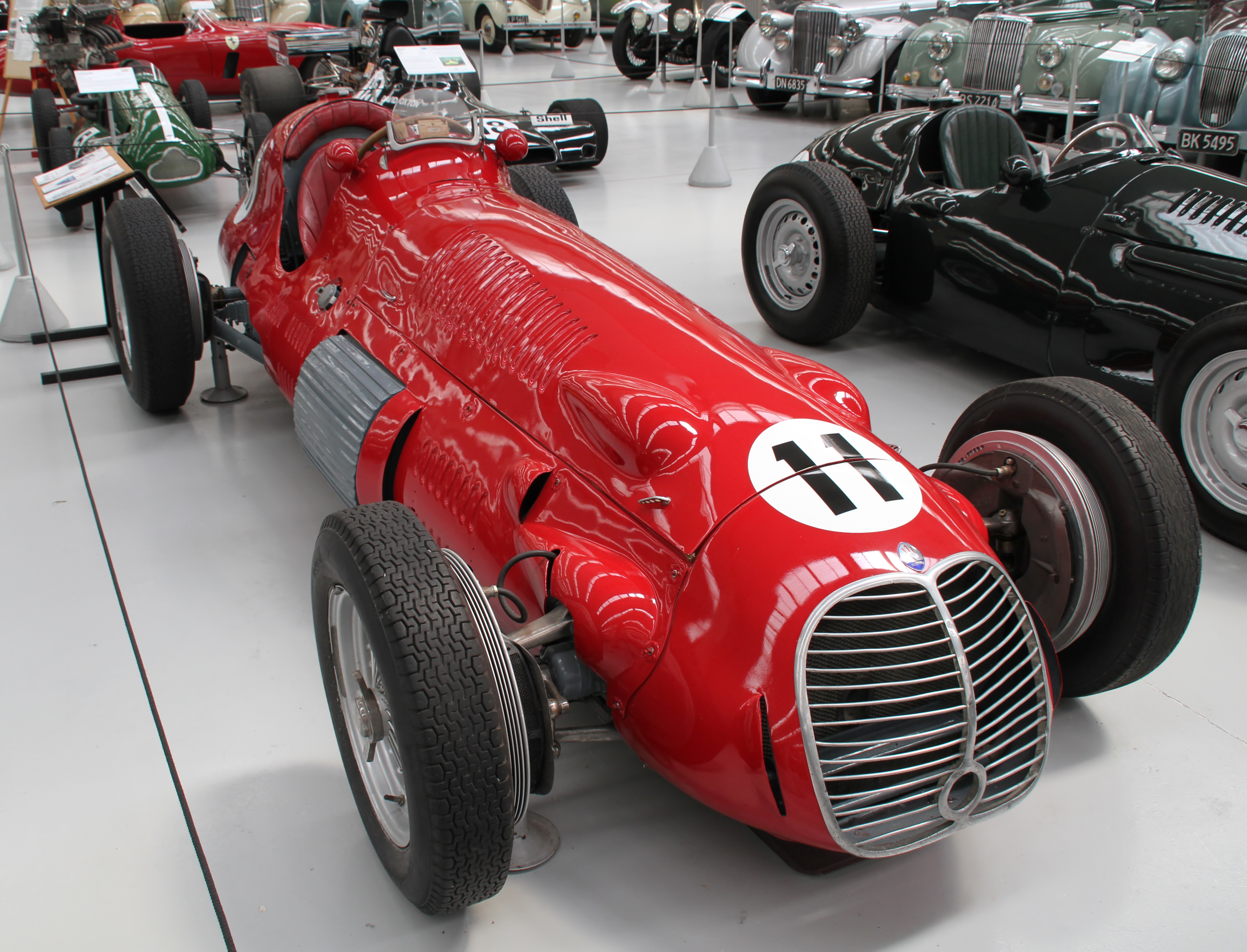
- Designer: Maserati
- Production: 1950
- Predecessor: Maserati 8CL
- Successor: Maserati A6GCM

Technical specifications
- Chassis: Steel box-section frame, aluminum body
- Suspension (front): Rigid axle, semi-elliptic leaf springs, friction shock absorbers
- Suspension (rear): Live axle, semi-elliptic leaf springs, friction shock absorbers
- Length: 3,850 mm (152 in)
- Width: 1,400 mm (55 in)
- Height: 1,000 mm (39 in)
- Axle track: 1,390 mm (55 in) (front); 1,355 mm (53.3 in) (rear)
- Wheelbase: 2,720 mm (107 in)
- Engine: 3.0 L (2,981.7 cc) Straight-8 (350–366 hp (261–273 kW)) FR layout
- Transmission: 4 speed manual transmission
- Weight: 800 kg (1,800 lb)

Competition history

The Maserati 8CLT is an open-wheel race car, designed, developed and built by Italian manufacturer Maserati in 1950, conforming to Formula One rules and regulations of the time, set by the FIA.

Two copies were produced, on behalf of the Italian drivers Nino Farina and Franco Rol, to participate in the 1950 Indianapolis 500, it never started the American race and was then sold in New Zealand.

== Racing and competitive history ==
The car was designed and built to take part in the Indianapolis 500. It replaced the obsolete 8CTF, which however still achieved important results.

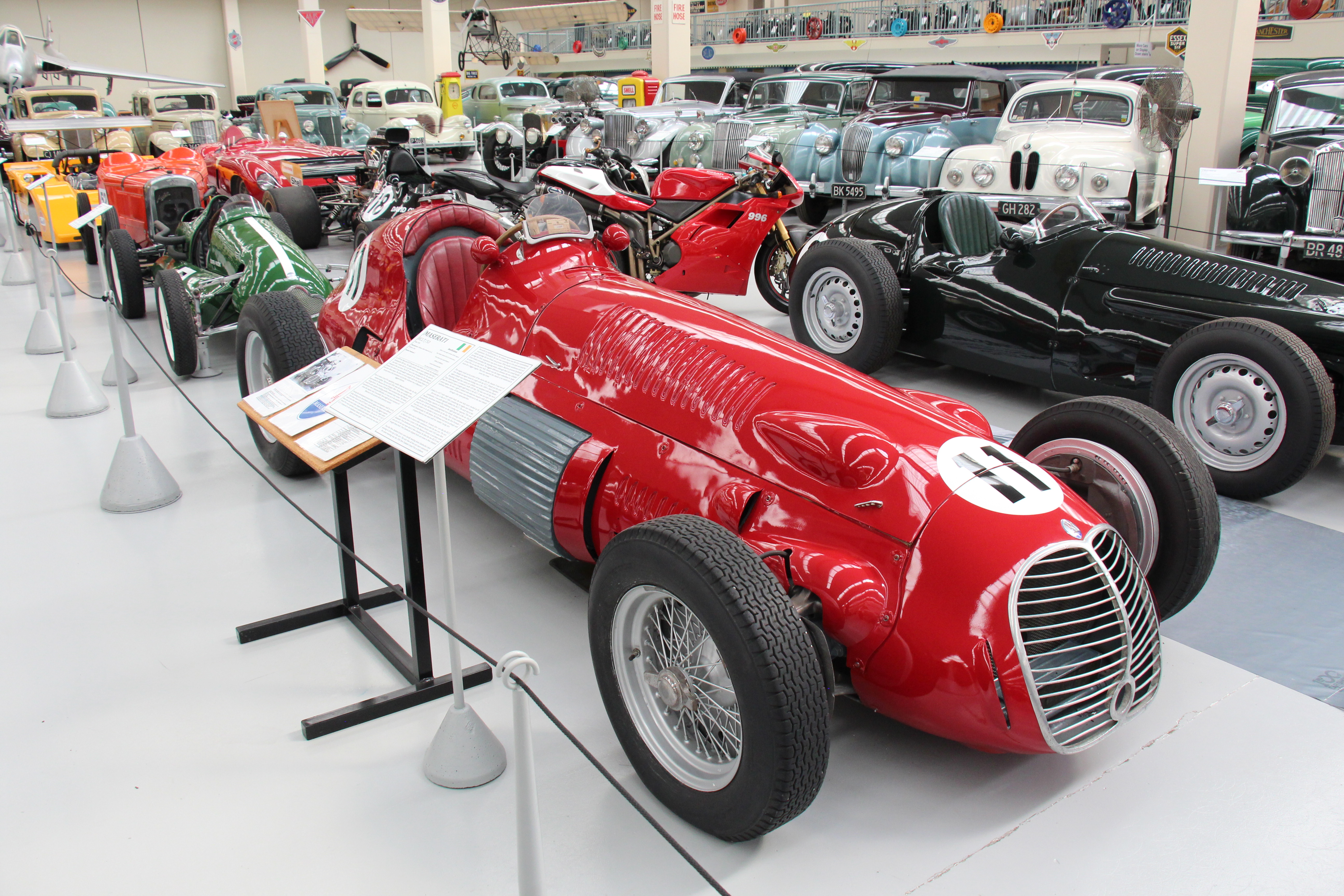
1950 Maserati 8CLT

The mechanics were inspired by that of the 8CL but were perfected using more modern metallurgical treatments and using more appropriate construction techniques.

The great power of the engine led Maserati to strengthen the chassis to obviate the greater stresses. The latter was derived from that of the 4CLT/48. Aerodynamics were also improved, and the model also featured 400mm front drums which were state-of-the-art for the time.

The Maserati, however, was not going through a good moment, and the development of the model was postponed. The subsequent launch at the Indianapolis 500, therefore, did not take place. Two examples were built, which were sold to Scuderia Zambucka, a New Zealand team.

== Design ==
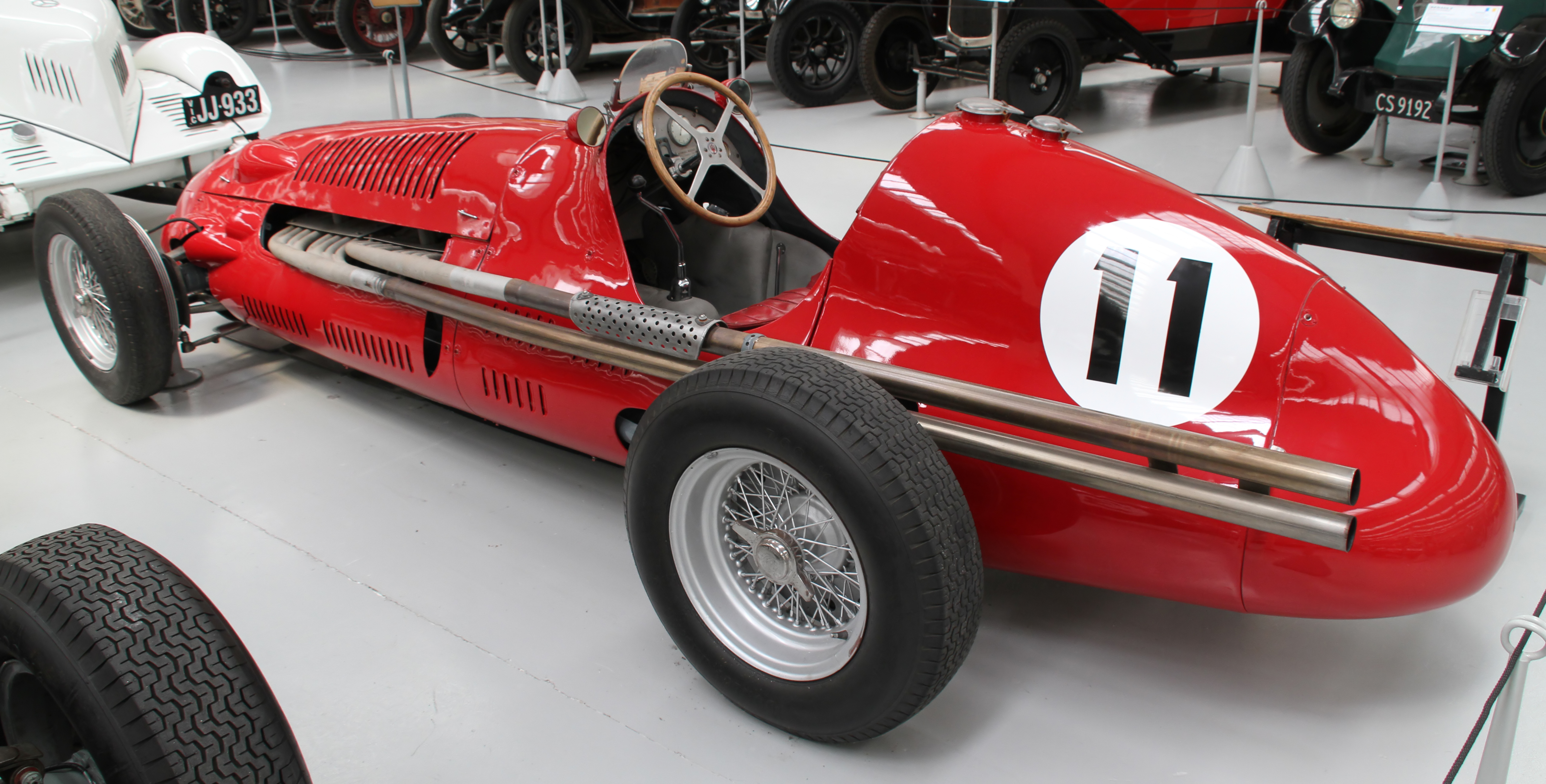
Rear-left quarter

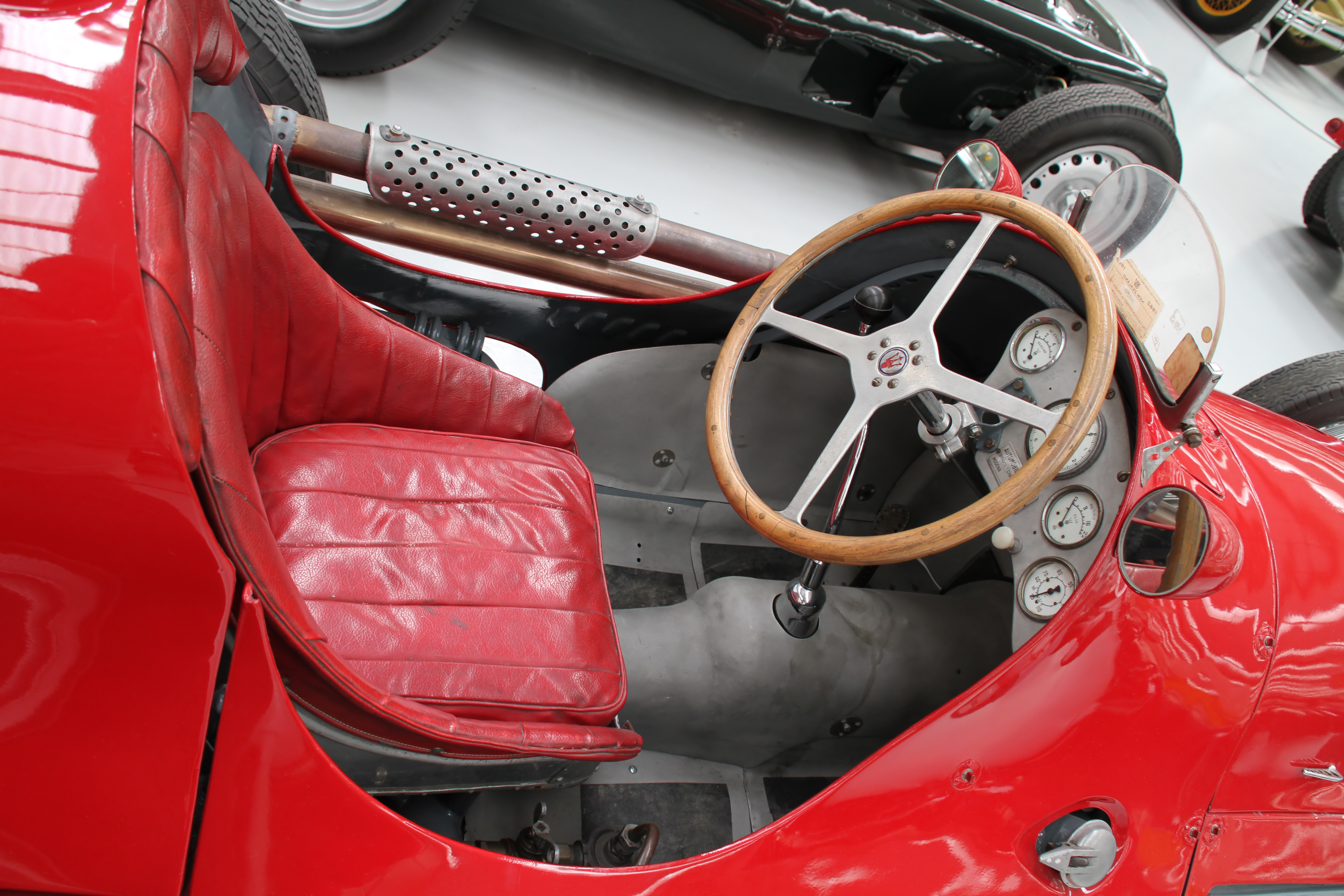
Cockpit

The ignition was single with a Marelli brand magnet. The feeding was forced with two Roots brand compressors, and a carburetor produced by Weber model 52 DCO, positioned upstream of the compressors themselves. Distribution was ensured by four valves per cylinder arranged in a 90° V, and a double overhead camshaft. Lubrication was forced with delivery and recovery pumps. The cooling system was water circulation with a centrifugal pump.

The engine was an eight-cylinder in-line which had a displacement of 2,981.7 cc (181.95 cu in) with the bore and stroke both being 78 mm (3.1 in) and a compression ratio of 6.5: 1. Both bore and stroke were 78mm. The power output was 430 hp at 6500 rpm.

The brakes were drum brakes on the wheels with hydraulic control. The front suspensions consisted of coil springs, while the rear ones consisted of leaf springs. Both were fitted with Houdaille hydraulic shock absorbers. The steering was a worm screw and toothed sector, while the transmission consisted of a four-speed gearbox plus reverse.

The body was an open-wheel design, covered in aluminum, while the chassis was tubular with side members and cross members.

The maximum speed reached by the model was 320 km/h (200 mph).

== Technical Data ==
Technical data	8CLT
Engine:	Front mounted 8-cylinder in-line engine
displacement:	2982 cm³
Bore x stroke:	78 x 78 mm
Max power at rpm:	430 hp at 6 500 rpm
Valve control:	2 overhead camshafts, 4 valves per cylinder
Compression:	6.5:1
Carburetor:	Double Weber 52DCO
Upload:	Double Roots compressors
Gearbox:	4-speed manual
suspension front:	Double cross links, coil springs
suspension rear:	Rigid rear axle, longitudinal leaf springs
Brakes:	Hydraulic drum brakes
Chassis & body:	Tubular space frame with aluminum body
Wheelbase:	272 cm
Dry weight:	800 kg
Top speed:	320 km/h

== See also ==
- Talbot-Lago T26C
