= Maserati 8CTF =

Open-wheel Grand Prix motor racing car

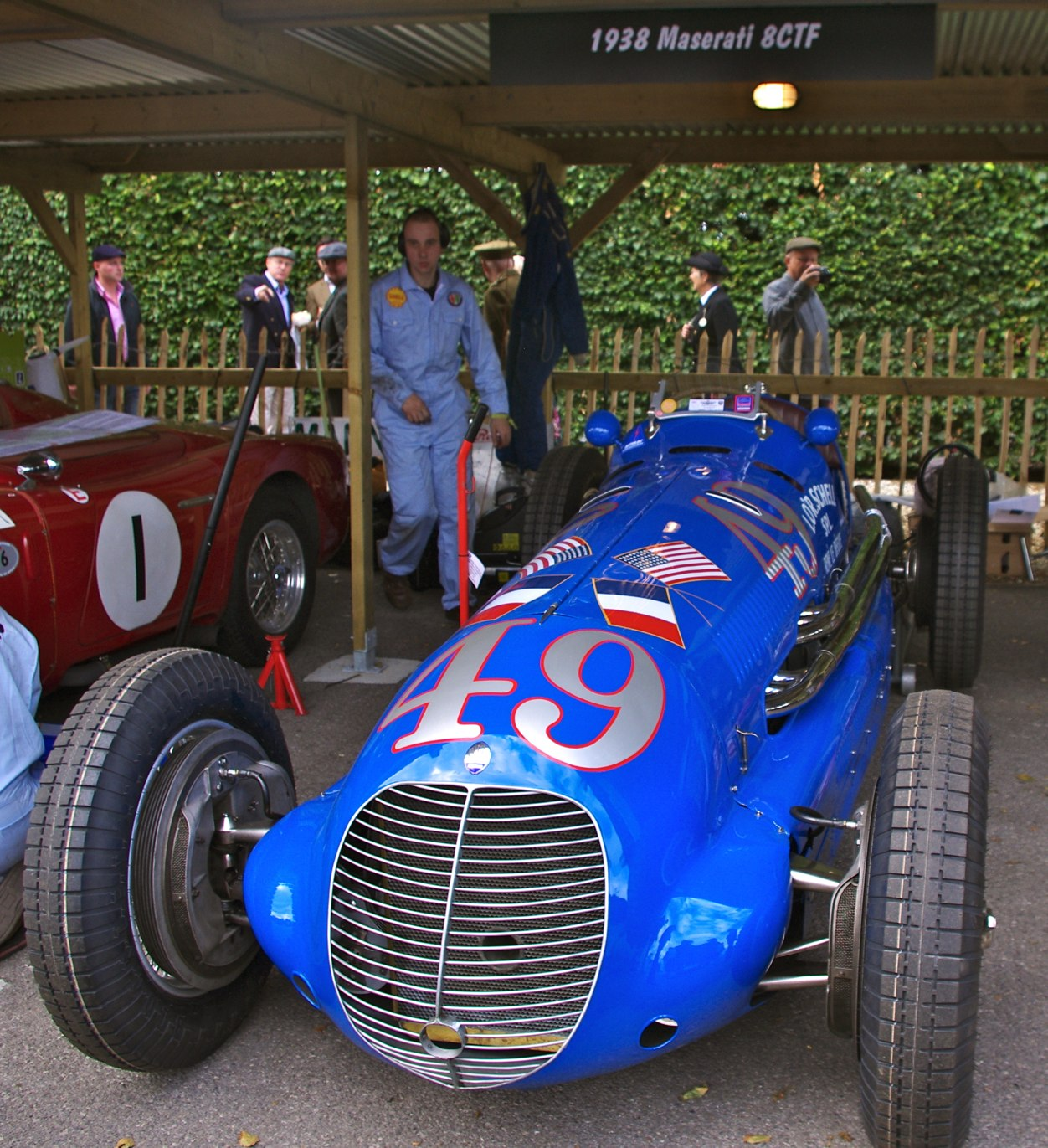
- Category: Race car
- Designer: Maserati
- Production: 1938-1939
- Predecessor: Maserati V8RI
- Successor: Maserati 8CL

Technical specifications
- Chassis: Steel box-section frame, aluminum body
- Suspension (front): Rigid axle, semi-elliptic leaf springs, friction shock absorbers
- Suspension (rear): Live axle, semi-elliptic leaf springs, friction shock absorbers
- Length: 4,100 mm (160 in)
- Width: 1,520 mm (60 in)
- Height: 1,100 mm (43 in)
- Axle track: 1,359 mm (53.5 in) (front and rear)
- Wheelbase: 2,723 mm (107.2 in)
- Engine: 3.0 L (180 cu in) Straight-8 (350–366 hp (261–273 kW)) FR layout
- Transmission: 4 speed manual transmission
- Weight: 780 kg (1,720 lb)

Competition history

The Maserati 8CTF is an open-wheel Grand Prix motor racing car designed, developed, and built by Italian manufacturer Maserati from 1938 to 1939. To date, it remains the only Italian-made car to win the Indianapolis 500 (excluding Dallara, which only supplies the chassis to the teams, not the engines).

== Racing and competitive history ==
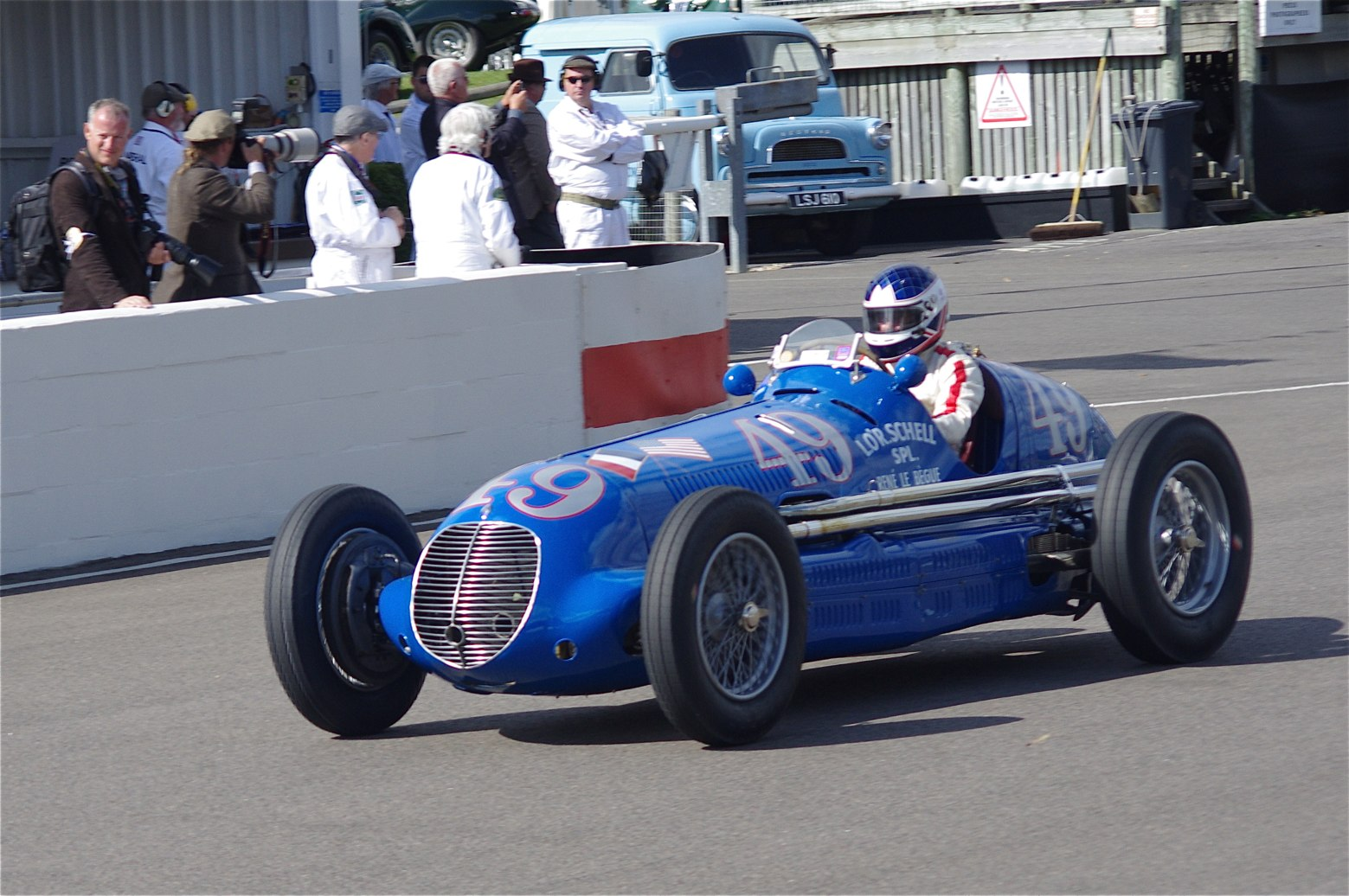
Maserati 8CTF at the Goodwood Revival in 2012.

The model was created after Adolfo Orsi took over Maserati, thus solving the economic problems that the manufacturer had. Ernesto Maserati was no longer so constrained by budgetary issues in the design of his models, and conceived a supercharged 3-liter where, for this type of fuel, he had accumulated good experience. The abbreviation "8CTF" means:

- 8C: the total number of cylinders;
- T: Head;
- F: Fixed.

Its main feature was an independent power supply for each series of four cylinders. It therefore fitted two Roots-type compressors. After subsequent improvements, in 1939, the engine came to deliver 366 hp. Another peculiarity that the 8CTF possessed was that the oil tank also acted as a central cross member of the frame.

The model debuted on May 15, 1938, at the Tripoli Grand Prix with excellent performance but failing in the final result. Due to the approach of the Second World War, the races thinned out considerably, thus compromising the development of the car.

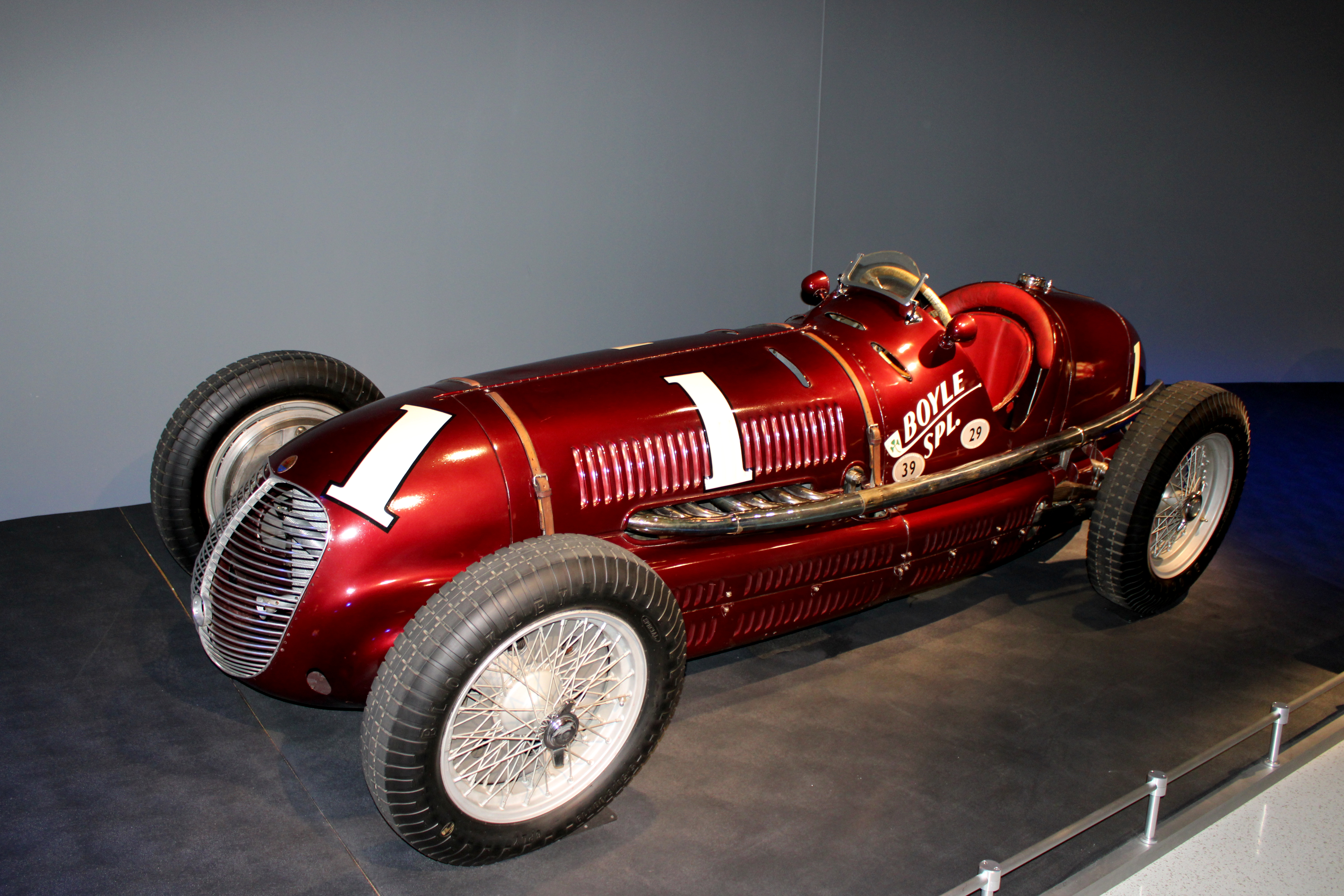
Wilbur Shaw's winning car from the 1939 and 1940 Indianapolis 500s

With Wilbur Shaw at the wheel, the 8CTF won two editions of the Indianapolis 500 in 1939 and 1940. The car that won the prestigious competition was nicknamed Boyle Special.

== Design ==
The ignition was single with spark type magnet. Feeding was forced with two Roots-type compressors coupled to two Memini and MA12 model carburetors mounted upstream of the compressors themselves. The distribution was two valves per cylinder arranged at 90°, with double overhead camshafts. Lubrication was forced with delivery and recovery pumps. The cooling system was water circulation with a centrifugal pump.

The engine was an eight-cylinder in-line vertical with 2,991.4 cc (182.55 cu in) of displacement. The bore and stroke were 69mm and 100mm respectively, while the compression ratio was 6.5:1. The maximum power output was between 350 and 366 hp at 6300 rpm.

The brakes were drum brakes on the wheels with hydraulic control. The front suspensions were with independent wheels and torsion bars, while the rear ones were with leaf springs . Both were also fitted with a stabilizer bar and friction shock absorbers (hydraulic for the latter). The steering was worm screw with toothed sector, while the transmission consisted of a four- speed gearbox plus reverse.

The body was an open-wheel design, covered in aluminum, while the chassis was made up of two side members in steel profiles with crossbars.

The 8CTF reached a top speed of 290 km/h (180 mph).

== Technical Data ==
Technical data	8CTF
Engine:	Front mounted 8-cylinder in-line engine
displacement:	2991 cm³
Bore x stroke:	69 x 100 mm
Max power at rpm:	350—366 hp at 6 300 rpm
Valve control:	2 overhead camshafts, 2 valves per cylinder
Compression:	6.5:1
Carburetor:	Double Memini MA12
Upload:	Double Roots compressors
Gearbox:	4-speed manual
suspension front:	Double cross links, torsion springs
suspension rear:	Rigid rear axle, longitudinal leaf springs
Brakes:	Hydraulic drum brakes
Chassis & body:	Box beam frame with aluminum body
Wheelbase:	272 cm
Dry weight:	780 kg
Top speed:	290 km/h

== See also ==
- Mercedes-Benz W154
- Auto Union racing cars
- Alfa Romeo Tipo 308
