= Maserati Tipo 151 =

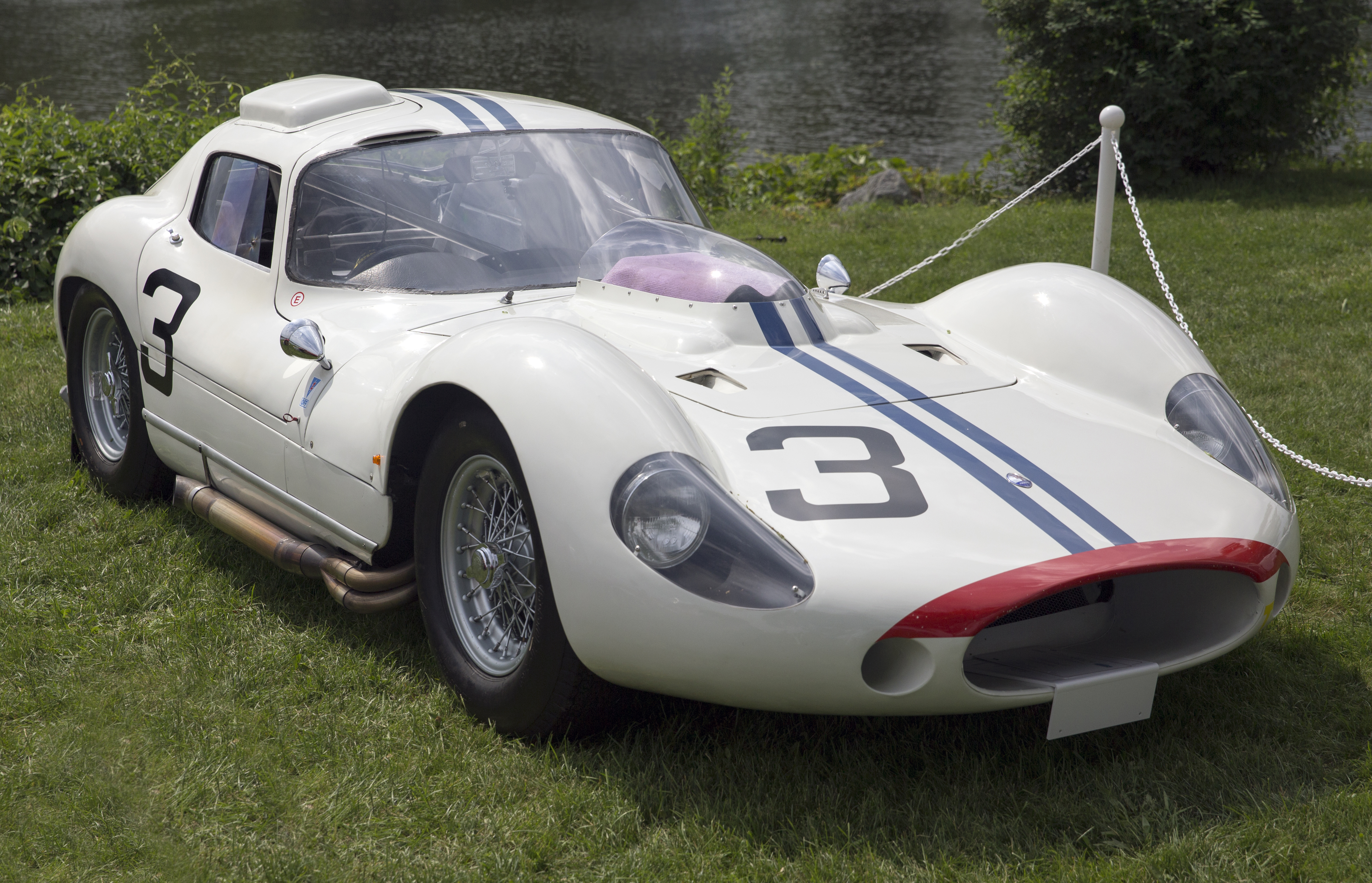

Overview
- Manufacturer: Maserati
- Production: 1962
- Assembly: Italy: Modena
- Designer: Giulio Alfieri (original design); Piero Drogo (Tipo 151 003)

Body and chassis
- Class: Racing car
- Body style: 2-door coupé
- Layout: Front mid-engine, rear-wheel-drive

Powertrain
- Engine: 4.0 L V8; 4.9 L V8
- Transmission: 5-speed manual

Dimensions
- Wheelbase: 2,350 mm (92.5 in)
- Curb weight: 975 kg (2,150 lb) (151 006); 973 kg (2,145 lb) (151 004); 981 kg (2,163 lb) (151 002)

Chronology
- Predecessor: Maserati Birdcage

The Maserati Tipo 151 is a racing car manufactured by Italian automobile manufacturer Maserati for the 1962 LeMans season to compete in the experimental GT car class. Three cars were built in total, one for Johnny Simone of Maserati France (151 002) with a red exterior colour and white tri-stripes whilst two were built for Briggs Cunningham (151 004 and 151 006) for his racing team. These cars had a white body with two blue stripes.

== Design and specifications ==
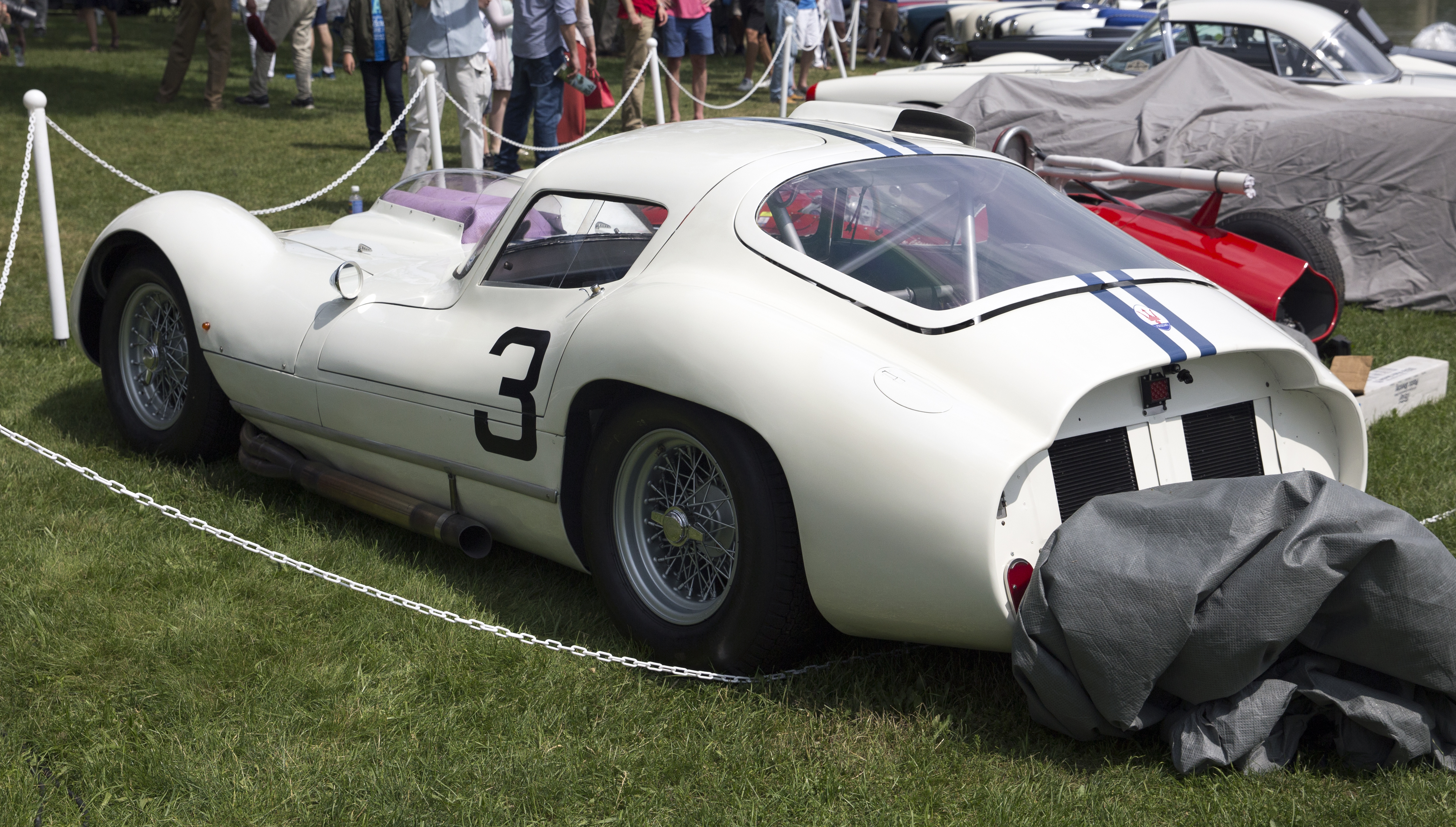
Maserati Tipo 151, chassis 006

The Tipo 151 marked a return to more traditional concepts of car design and used a frame comprising a trellis of both round and oval large tubes, an independent front suspension and a De Dion axle which was modified to act like a swing-arm axle. The V8 engine was derived from the 450S with a reduced displacement of just under 4.0 litres due to a restriction imposed by the FIA that the participants in the experimental GT cars should have 4-litre engines. The block featured a smaller bore (91 mm, down from 94 mm) and an even shorter stroke (76 mm instead of 81 mm) along with a compression rato of 9.7:1. Other changes included four gear-driven camshafts, a dry sump lubrication system and four Weber 45 IDMs carburettors. The engine was rated at 360 hp (268 kW).

The aluminium body was designed by Giulio Alfieri and refined using a wind tunnel at Milan University. It was reminiscent of the Frank Costin designed Zagato bodied 450S, but with an accentuated Kamm Tail. The mandatory doors opened halfway up the side due to the longitudinal tubes of the frame and the lateral fuel tanks. The chassis was designed by Giorgio Molinari while the suspension was designed by Gianpaolo Dallara who had recently joined Maserati.

Early testing revealed handling problems which were solved by adding a homokinetic joint to the suspension system suggested by Bruce McLaren, one of the drivers of the Cunningham team. There were also ventilation problems and excessive rear tyre wear which were never resolved because of lack of proper testing due to the cars being completed shortly before the LeMans race.

== Competition history ==
The cars proved quick at the qualifying sessions, with one Cunningham car driven by Dick Thompson and Bill Kimberley qualifying in third place with the second Cunningham car driven by Walt Hansgen and Bruce McLaren qualifying at the fifth place while the Maserati France car qualified at the seventh place.

The cars were quick at the start of the race but began suffering from reliability problems. The 151 driven by Kimberly and Thompson went off the track due to poorly fitted brake pads and retired after 62 laps with a damaged radiator. The Maserati France entry experienced excessive rear tyre wear forcing tyre change every ten laps. It was voluntarily retired after 152 laps to avoid a major accident. The 151 driven by Hansgen and McLaren lasted the longest and was at the fifth place in early morning but experienced a transmission failure and retired after 178 laps.

After the race, the cars went to the Maserati factory for servicing and the Cunningham team cars were taken to the US where they were subject to further modifications. The 151 004 was fitted with 5.7 litre V8 engine for a race in October 1962 where it yielded worse results. It was modified further for the 1963 Daytona American Challenge Cup, fitted with 7.0-litre Ford V8 and some axle modifications. The car suffered an accident and was written off during the race and scavenged for parts. The 151 006 was sold to Bev Spencer who campaigned it in SCAA events where it suffered from issues with the braking system. It was sold to Chuck Jones afterwards who converted it into a road car after failing to sell it. It was bought by German car collector Peter Kaus who restored it to its original specifications and displayed it in his personal car collection before auctioning the car in 2006.

The Maserati France car was sent to the factory for revision for the 1963 Le Mans event. Improvements included a 4,941 cc (4.9 L) engine derived from the 5000 GT but with single ignition and Lucas indirect injection rated at 430 hp (321 kW). The car was renumbered as 151 003. The car was campaigned in the 1963 season but retired after a transmission failure. For 1964, the changes included a new 37 inch tall body designed by Piero Drogo (built by Allegretti), a lengthened chassis, a wider track and a switch to dry sump lubrication for the engine, reducing the power output to 410 hp (306 kW). It performed well during the race recording a top speed of 310.0 km/h (192.6 mph) on the Mulsanne Straight but retired after 99 laps due to electrical and braking issues.

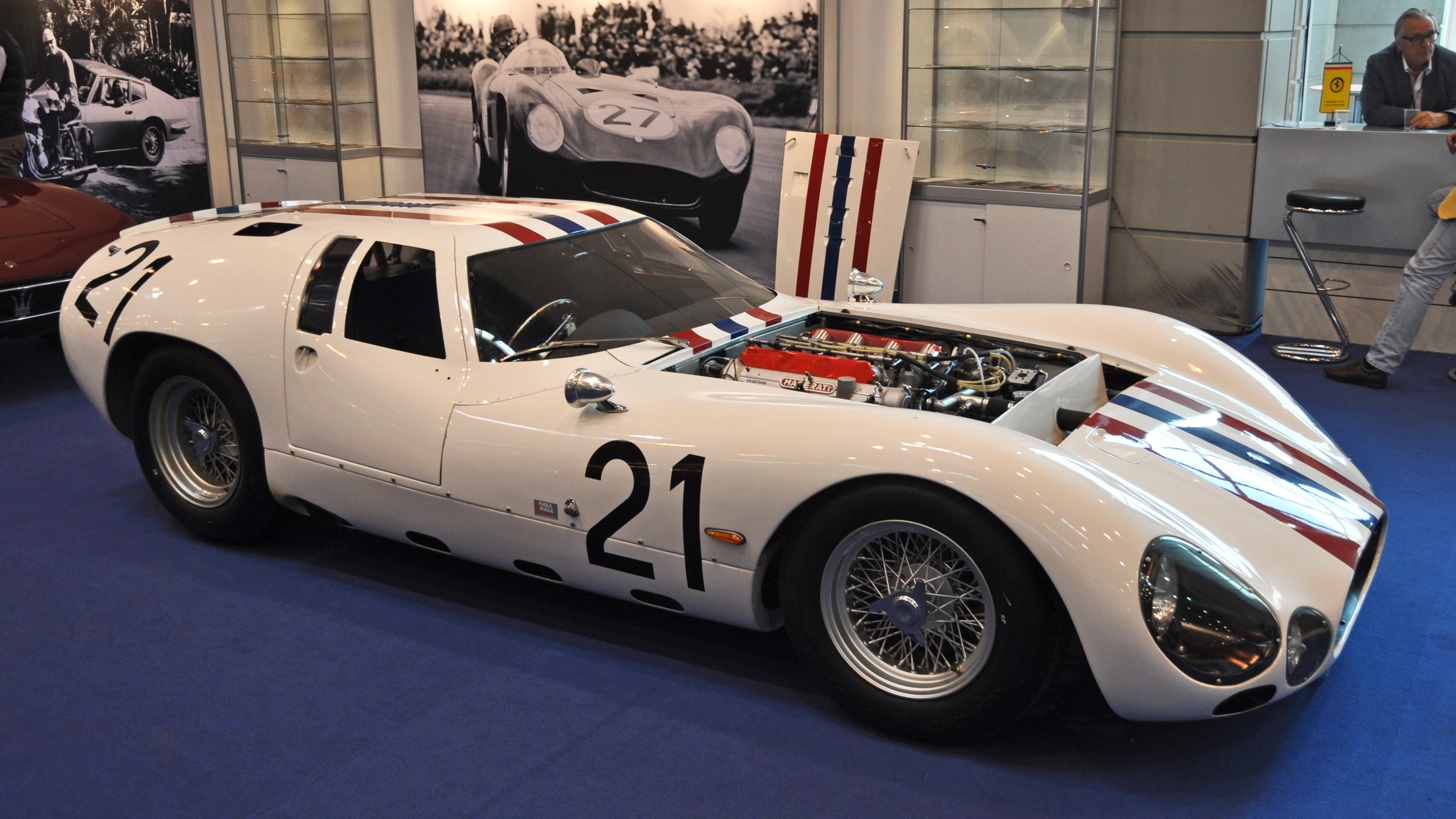
Maserati Tipo 151 003 featuring a Piero Drogo designed body

For 1965, the car was further modified and fitted with a 5,044 cc (5.0 L) engine rated at 450 hp (336 kW). Other modifications included the re-adoption of dual ignition, increased fuel capacity of 160-litres, a modified front suspension, a redesigned tail and large girling disc brakes. Tragedy struck on April 10 when driver "Lucky" Casner was killed in an accident during the official testing weekend for the 1965 24 Hours of Le Mans. Casner lost control of the vehicle as he exited out of the Mulsanne Straight kink and rolled the car onto trees. The engine went on to power the Tipo 65 less than 2 months later. A replica of the car was commissioned by German car collector Peter Kaus. The body was made using the original body molds used by Allegretti and was fitted on a German made chassis using a V8 engine used in the Tipo 54 race car. A recreation of the 151 003 was built using a spare body shell at the Maserati factory.
