= Nick May =

Canadian motorcycle racer (born 1988)

Personal information
- Full name: Nicholas Kevin James May
- Born: April 4, 1988 Ottawa, Ontario, Canada
- Height: 5 ft 8 in (1.73 m)
- Weight: 155 lb (70 kg)

Sport
- Sport: Motocross

Nicholas K.J. May (born 4 April 1988, in Ottawa) is a retired Canadian motocross racer who raced professionally in the CMRC nationals.

== Career ==
May started racing in 2002 and collected multiple amateur championships throughout his youth. In his final year as an amateur, May raced on a broken leg to collect enough points to achieve his season goal of winning two Intermediate championships. His goal was reached and he came out with the 2009 MX1 and MX2 Intermediate Motocross Championship.

In 2009, May raced in the Dominican Republic Motocross Nationals to represent Canada where he earned a respectable fourth place finish. Because of his results and his attitude he was chosen as the DMX Factory Rider For A Day. He was given the opportunity to race on a team for his hometown National at the Sand Del Lee Motocross Park. At the end of the 2009 season, he was awarded his MX2 Pro license.
