= Maserati Tipo 61 =

Maserati Tipo 60/61
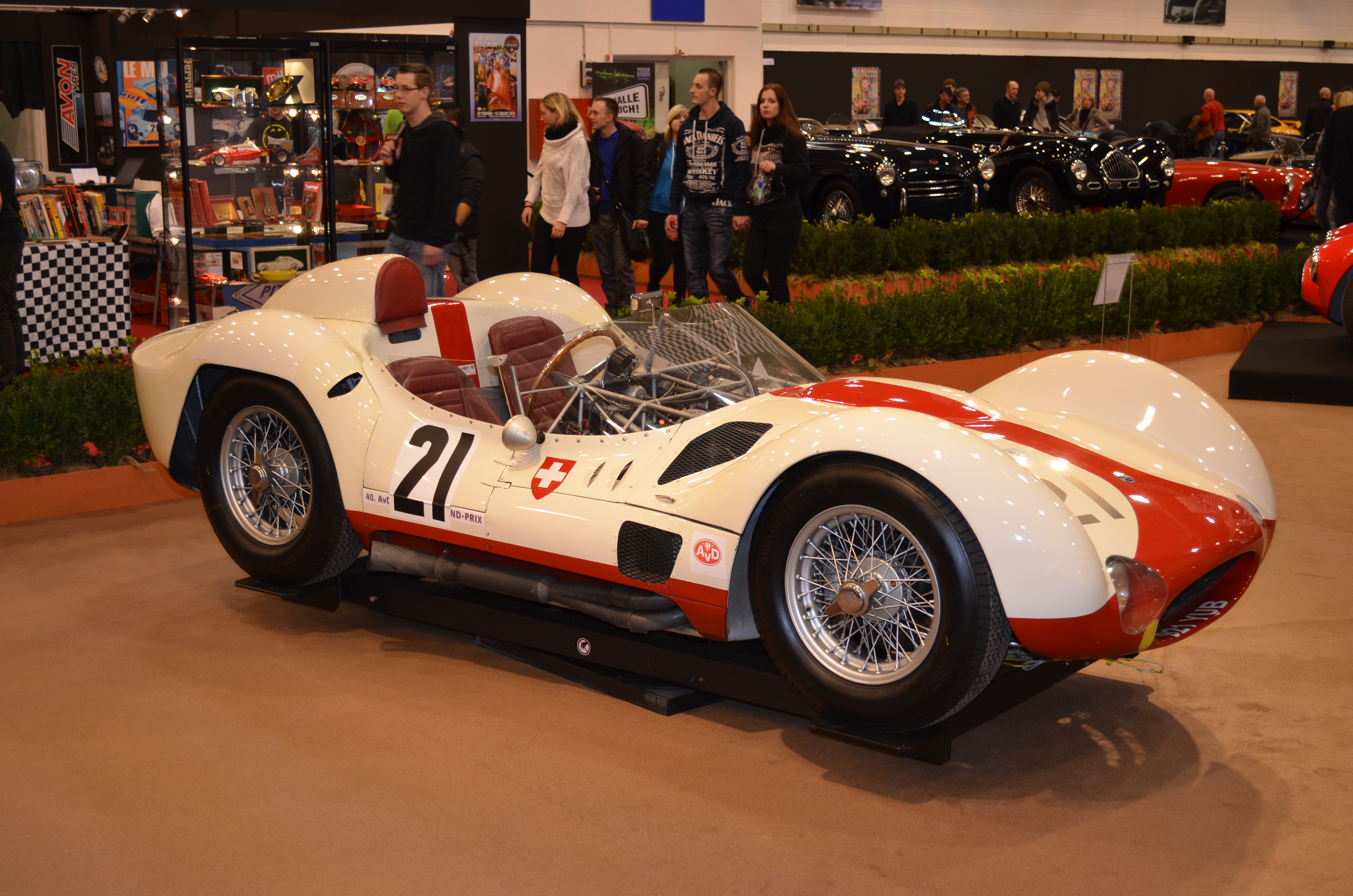

Overview
- Manufacturer: Maserati
- Also called: Birdcage
- Production: 1959–1961; 16 + 1 units (Tipo 61); 6 units (Tipo 60)
- Assembly: Italy: Modena
- Designer: Giulio Alfieri

Body and chassis
- Class: Racing car
- Body style: 2-door speedster
- Layout: Front mid-engine, rear-wheel-drive; Rear mid-engine, rear-wheel-drive

Powertrain
- Engine: 1,990 cc (2.0 L) inline-four (Tipo 60); 2,890 cc (2.9 L) inline-four (Tipo 61)
- Transmission: 5-speed manual

Dimensions
- Wheelbase: 2,200 mm (87 in)
- Curb weight: 570 kg (1,260 lb) (Tipo 60); 600 kg (1,300 lb) (Tipo 61)

Chronology
- Successor: Maserati Tipo 151

The Maserati Tipo 60/61 (commonly referred to as the Maserati Birdcage) are a series of sports racing cars produced between 1959 and 1961 by Italian automobile manufacturer Maserati for privateers racing in sports car events including the 24 Hours of Le Mans in the 2-litre and 3-litre racing category. It used an intricate tubular space frame chassis, containing about 200 chro-moly steel tubes welded together, arranged triangular formation at high stress areas of the chassis, hence the nickname "Birdcage". This method of construction provided a more rigid and, at the same time, lighter chassis than other racing cars of the time.

By recessing the windscreen base into the bodywork, Maserati was able to reduce the effect of new Le Mans rules demanding a tall windscreen. The Camoradi team became famous racing the Tipo 61s but, despite being very competitive, the Birdcage was somewhat unreliable and retired from many races due to problems with the drivetrain.

The road legal version of the 2004 Maserati MC 12 was available in a white colour with blue stripes livery as a tribute to the Tipo 61 and the Camoradi racing team.

The Tipo 60/61 were succeeded by the Tipo 151 which used a more conventional tubular chassis.

== Development history ==
In 1958, the Orsi family assigned technical director Giulio Alfieri to devise technical solutions to make Maserati race cars more competitive on the track, he was given freedom despite the company's difficult financial situation at the time. The initial idea was to use a backbone chassis, as used by Maserati's competitors but that idea did not go ahead. In October 1958, Alfieri and his team came up with an innovative idea which consisted of using 200 small steel tubes having a diameter between 10 and 15 mm welded together in very short lengths in a complex mesh to form a cage like structure.

A compact 1,990 cc (2.0 L) four-cylinder engine taken from the 200S was mounted at the front of the car at a 45-degree angle and towards the centre for a better centre of gravity. The engine was significantly modified, having newly designed cylinder heads, a 93x72 mm bore and stroke, twin Weber 45 DCO3 carburettors, Marelli battery powered dual ignition and a revised exhaust system. It was rated at 200 hp (149 kW; 203 PS). The suspension systems consisted of spiral springs at the front and De Dion rear axle with single transverse leaf spring. The construction techniques used on the chassis allowed for a low weight of 570 kg (1,257 lb).

The first car was completed in May 1959 and was given to Stirling Moss for testing. Initial tests revealed cracks in the chassis. The development team would resolve the issue by changing the grade of the steel used to construct the chassis. On 12 July 1959, the Tipo 60 won in its debut race, driven by Moss. This caught the attention of American racing teams competing in the 3-litre class. After demands of making a 3-litre variant of the car available, the displacement of the engine was increased to 2,890 cc (2.9 L) which resulted in an increase in the power output by 50 hp (37 kW; 51 PS). Consequently, weight was increased to 600 kg (1,323 lb) due to the use of a revised propeller shaft in the engine. This change did not affect the fuel consumption which gave the car a significant advantage during races. The revised version of the car was called the Tipo 61.

== Racing history ==
The Tipo 60/61's impressive performance would catch the attention of "Lucky" Casner. After testing a prototype of the car at the Modena Autodrome, and on his request, a prototype of a Tipo 60 would be converted to a Tipo 61 and delivered to him fielded by Maserati. Initial races with Carroll Shelby driving the car would be troublesome but the car showed promising results at the 1960 Targa Florio driven by Umberto Maglioli but would retire due to an engine failure. Casner founded the Casner Motor Racing Division who raced three Tipo 61's in the 1960 24 Hours of Le Mans. In the race, the Tipo 61 would show impressive performance, clocking speeds of 272.0 km/h (169 mph) and maintaining a lead over cars fielded by rival Ferrari of over 4 minutes but a starter motor problem would push the team to last place. Rain combined with the impractical windshield design would once again not let the car finish. The Tipos never won Le Mans due to reliability issues, however in both 1960 and 1961 the Camoradi team won the 1000 km Nürburgring.

== The Birdcage series ==
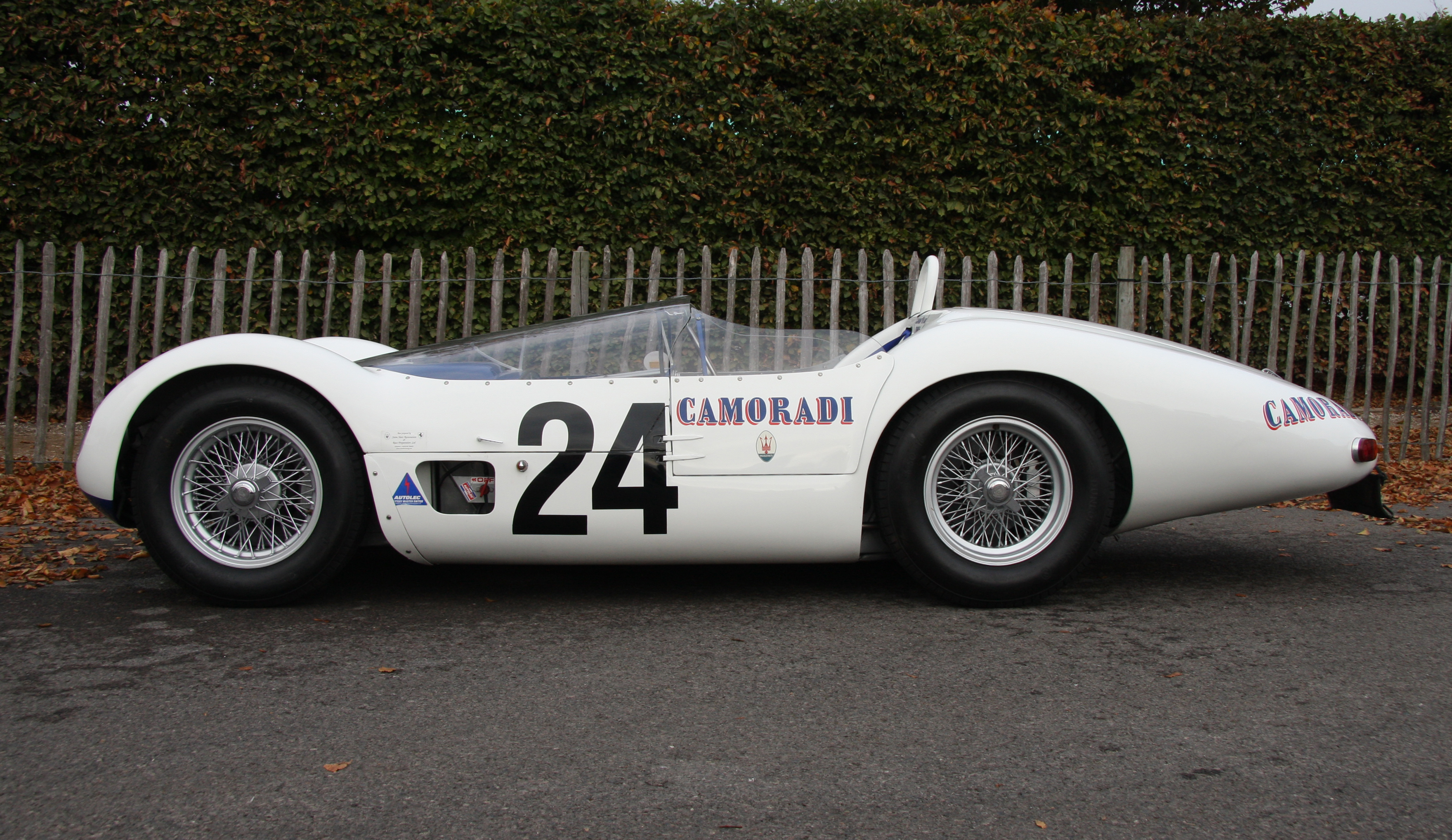
Maserati Tipo 61 "Streamliner" of Camoradi Racing

The Tipo 61 was the most well known model but Giulio Alfieri designed 5 different models, all based on an intricate multi-tubular frame concept. This multi-tubular construction produced a lightweight and rigid chassis that was a significant competitive advantage for a racing car. All models included independent front suspension, 4-wheel disc brakes and 5-speed transmission. A De Dion type rear axle was used on the Tipo 60 and 61.

The Tipo 60 featured a small 2-litre 4-cylinder engine rated at 200 hp (149 kW), located in the front and tilted over at a 45° angle for a lower center of gravity. The weight was 570 kg (1,257 lb) and the car had at a maximum speed of 270 km/h (168 mph).

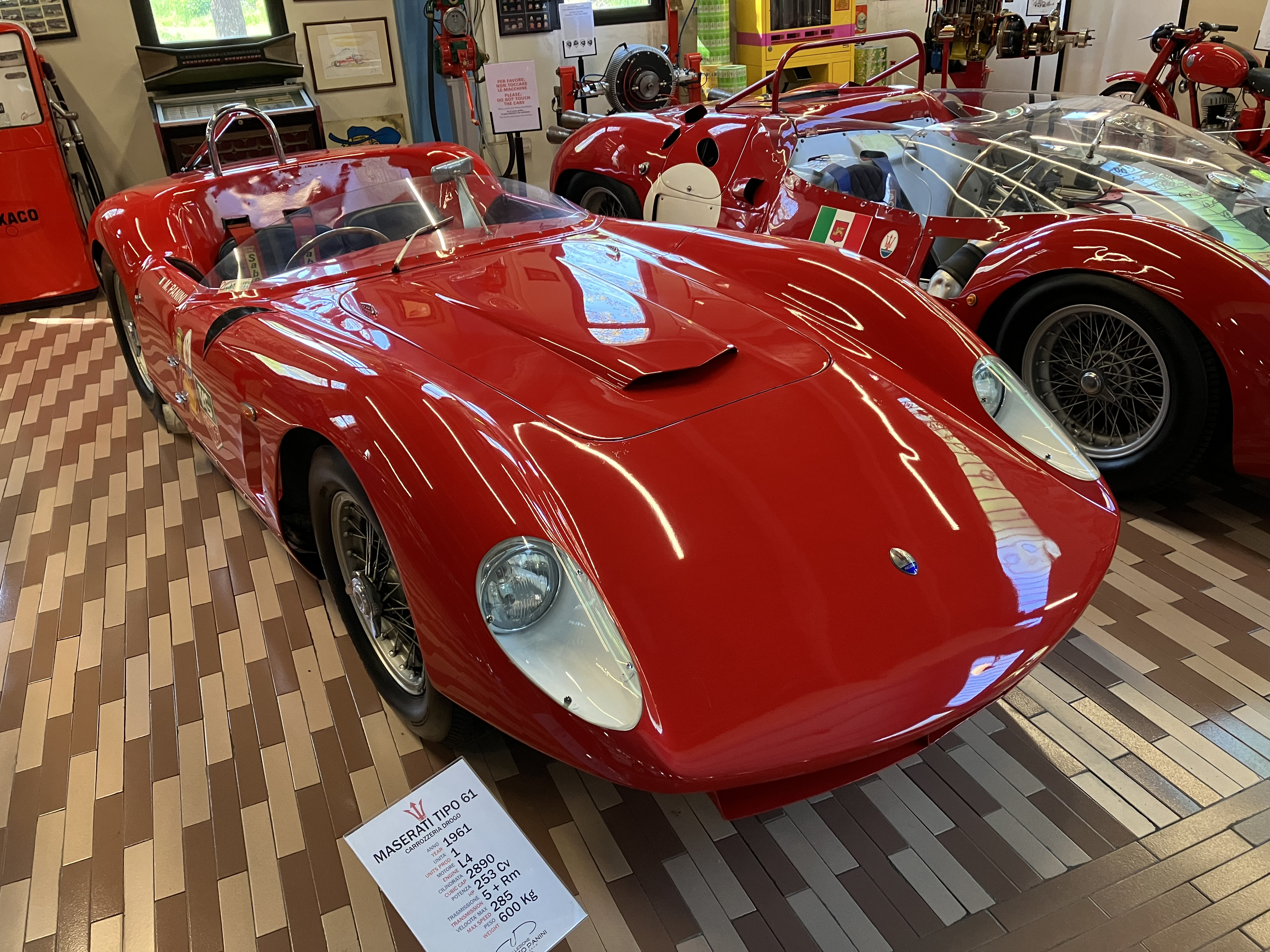
Maserati Tipo 61 Carrozzeria Drogo at the Umberto Panini museum

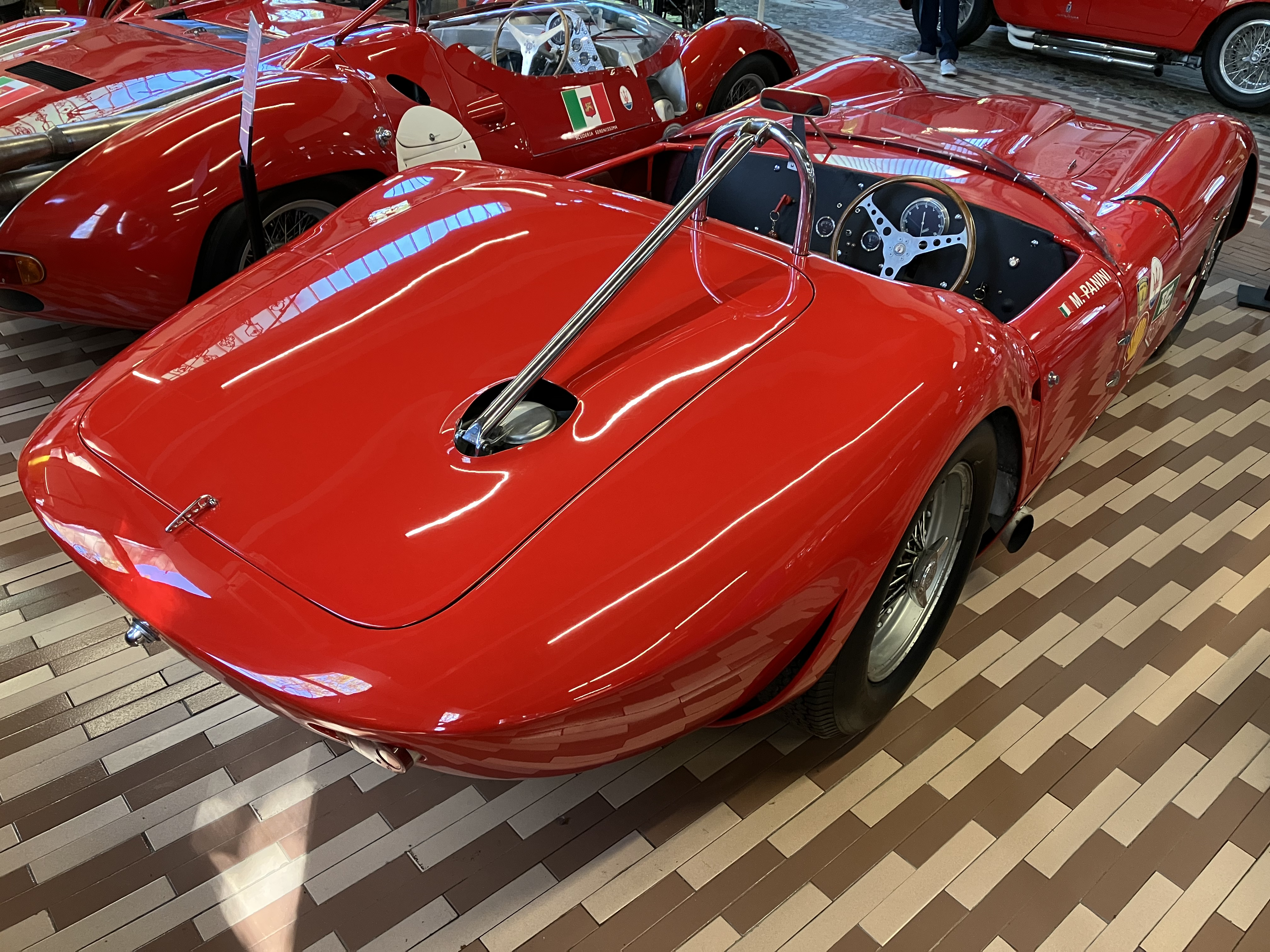
Rear view of the Maserati Tipo 61 Carrozzeria Drogo at the Umberto Panini museum

The Tipo 61 featured a 2.9-liter 4-cylinder engine rated at 250 hp (186 kW), located in the front at a 45° angle for a weight of 600 kg (1,323 lb) pushing the car at a speed of 285 km/h (177 mph).

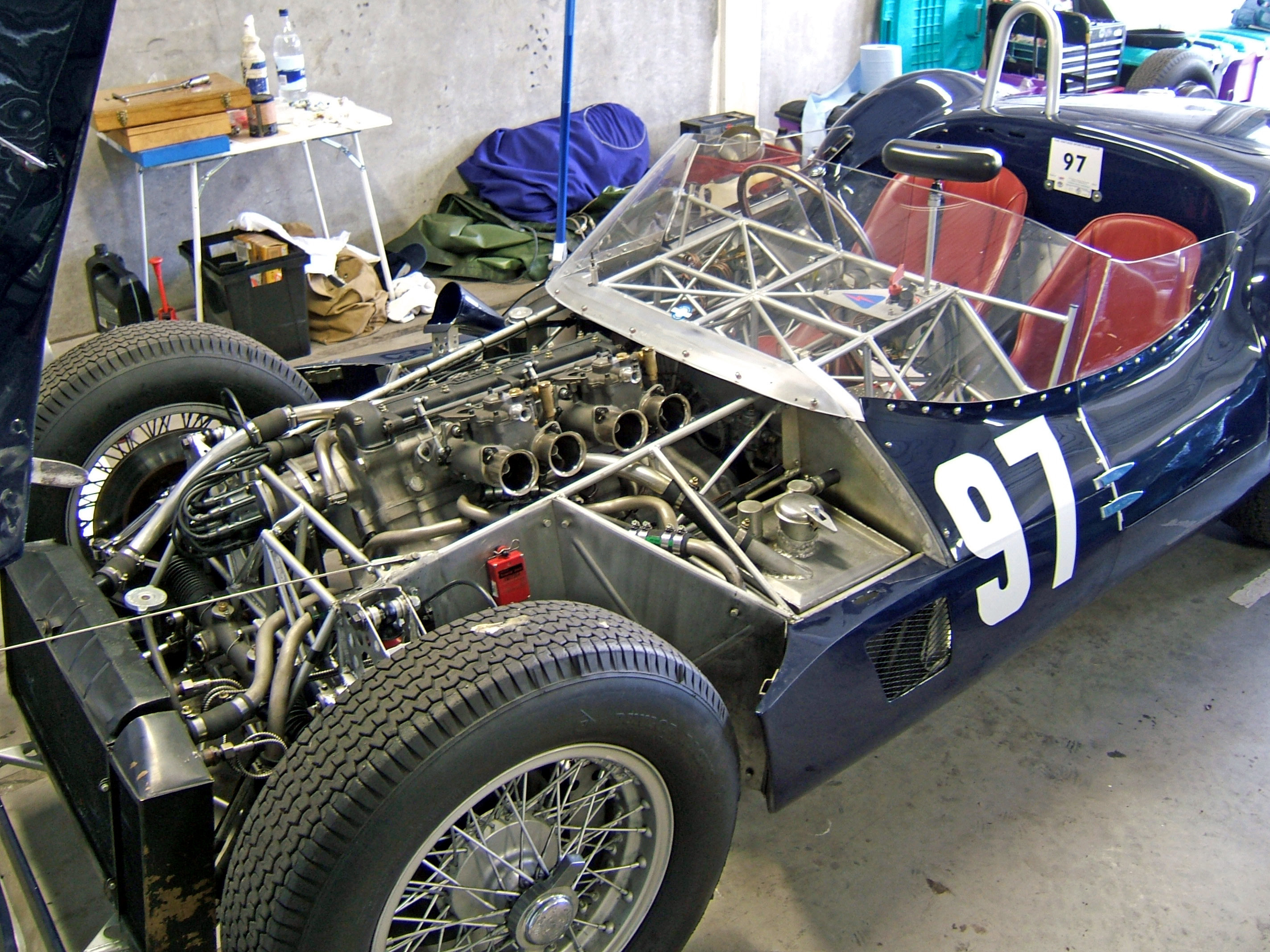
Maserati Tipo 61 with front body section removed

The mid-engined Birdcage cars began with the Tipo 63. Maserati now changed to a mid-engine configuration using a similar multi-tubular chassis construction as the Tipo 60/61. The rear suspension was changed to an independent double wishbone configuration.

The Tipo 63 through 65 cars have been described as a "historian's nightmare". Maserati was in difficult financial circumstances and Giulio Alfieri was trying to build a competitive car on a low budget. He would retrieve various engines from the Maserati parts bins. Then, he had them modified and installed in the ten various chassis that were constructed from the ground up. The Tipo 63 was raced with four-cylinder and twelve-cylinder engines and the chassis was radically redesigned when the first version proved less competitive than the Tipo 61.

The Tipo 63 first used a 4-cylinder engine similar to the Tipo 61 and later a V12 engine from the 1957 250F Grand Prix car. The Tipo 63 cars raced in 1961 with both engines, placing 4th at the 24 hours of Le Mans (12 cylinder version) with Briggs Cunningham's team. Count Volpi's Scuderia Serenissima hired Medardo Fantuzzi to modify one of their Tipo 63 cars with a longer nose and a fin behind the driver.

Maserati Tipo 63 test mule, featuring a V12 engine

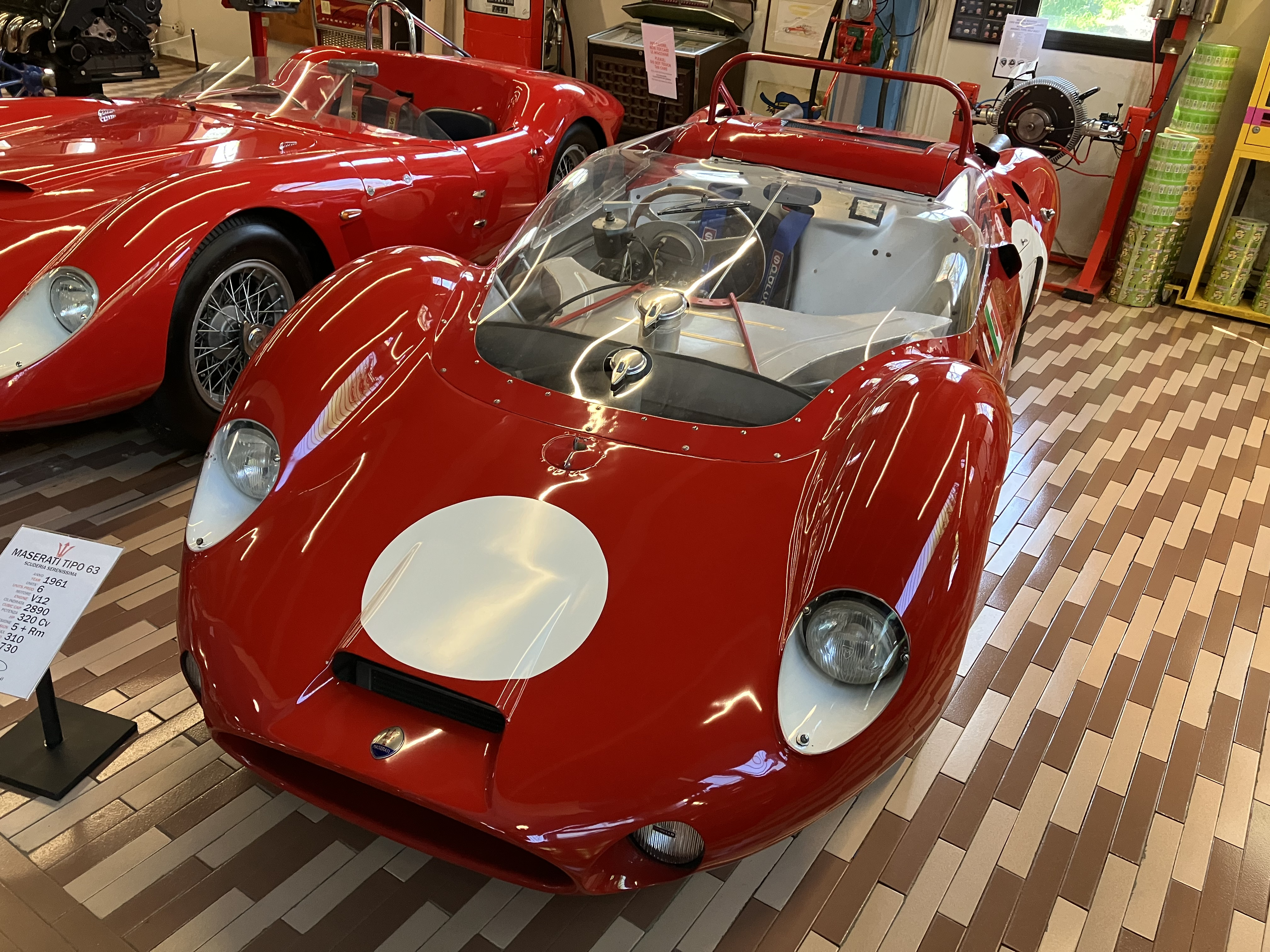

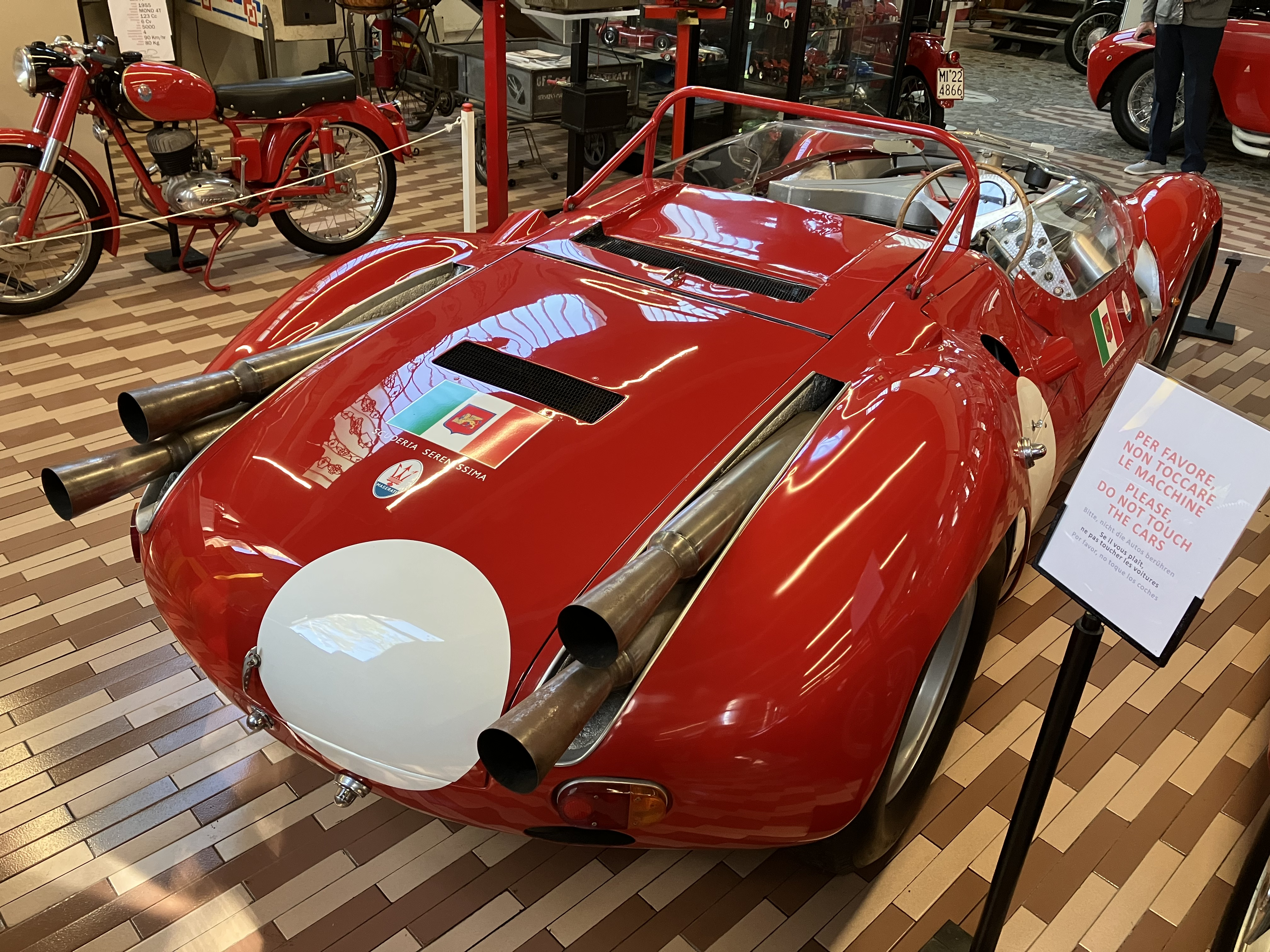

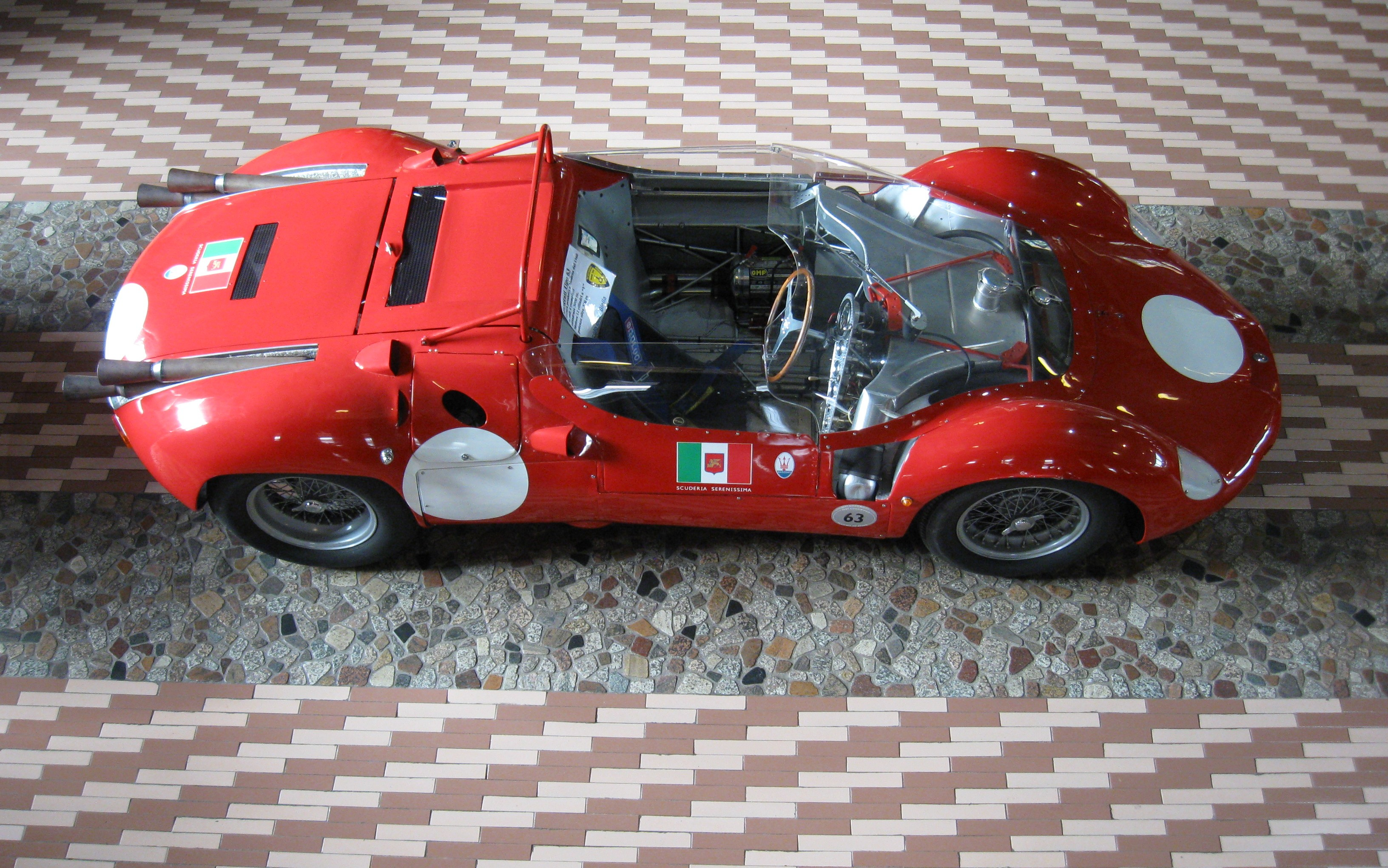

The Tipo 64 featured the same 3-liter V12 as the Tipo 63 with an upgraded frame (many smaller light alloy tubes) - nicknamed "Supercage". The all new body was designed by Franco Scaglione.

The Tipo 65 featured a 5-litre V8 engine similar to the one used in the Tipo 151 003 delivering about 430 hp (321 kW) pushing the car at 350 km/h (217 mph). Only one car was built using a modified Tipo 63 chassis.

== Maserati Birdcage 75th (2005 concept car) ==
The Maserati Birdcage 75th is a concept car to honor both the Birdcage and the 75th anniversary of Pininfarina. It features a 700 bhp (522 kW) V12 engine.
