= Cunningham C-4R =

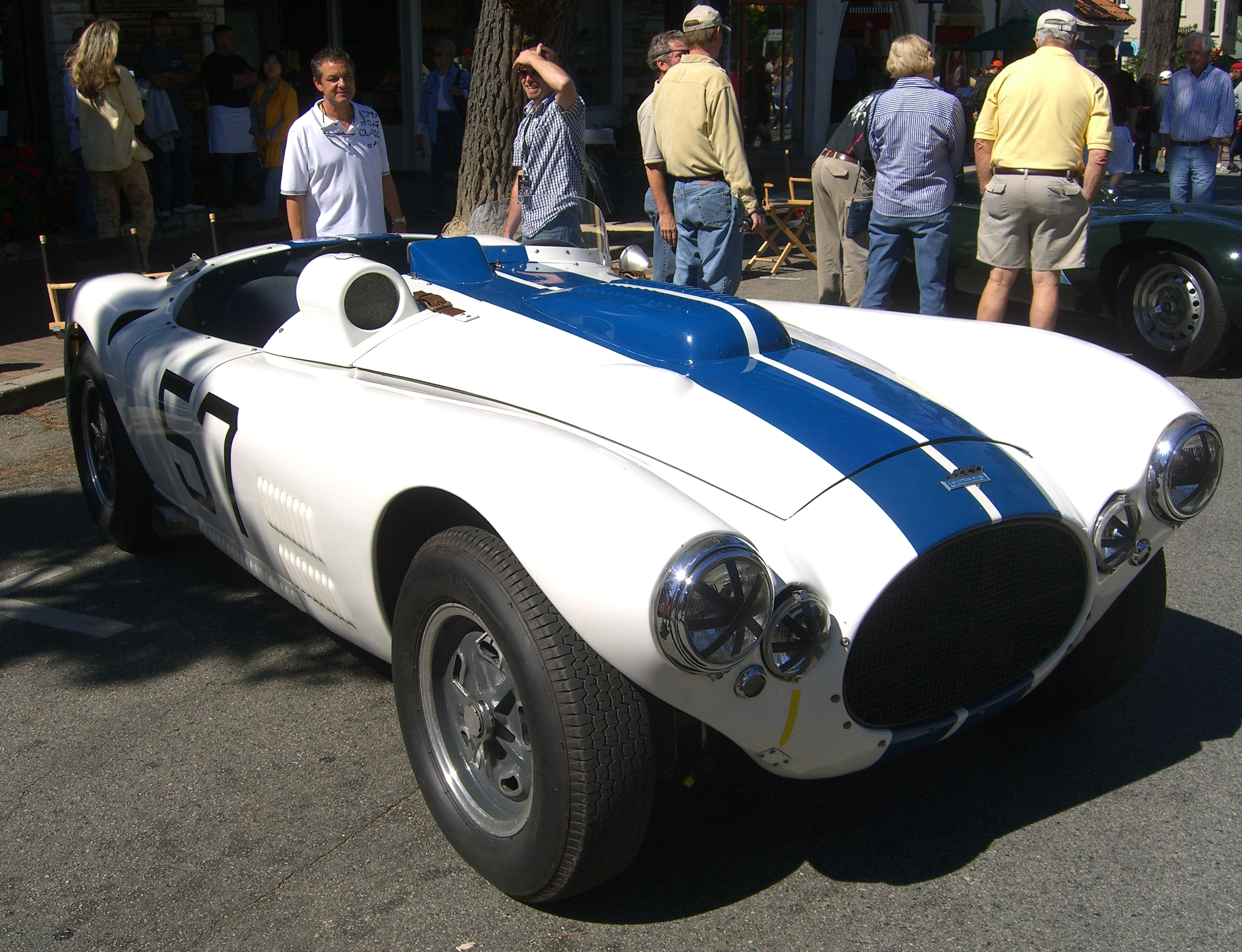

Overview
- Manufacturer: B. S. Cunningham Company
- Designer: Briggs Weaver

Body and chassis
- Body style: Coupe; Spyder
- Layout: F/R
- Platform: Custom

Powertrain
- Engine: Chrysler Firepower V8
- Transmission: 3-speed Cadillac manual

Chronology
- Predecessor: Cunningham C-3
- Successor: Cunningham C-5R

The Cunningham C-4R is a sports car developed in 1952 for the Briggs Cunningham racing team. It won 10 races between 1952 and 1956, including 8 race wins in its class, and scored 16 podium finishes.

== Development history ==
The C-4R was the successor to the C-2R, with which Briggs Cunningham had competed at Le Mans in 1951. Three chassis were built from the C-4R, two Spyders, and a Coupé. The vehicles were powered by a 5.5 L (340 cu in) Chrysler V8 engine.

== Racing history ==
Of all the racing cars built by Cunningham, the C-4R was the most successful. In 51 race starts, 12 victories were achieved; 26 races ended with a podium finish. There were also eight class wins. The racing car type was driven for the first time in 1952 at the SCCA championship round in Bridgehampton. Phil Walters dropped out because of a defective exhaust. Briggs Cunningham and Bill Spear finished the 1952 24 Hours of Le Mans in fourth place overall and celebrated victory in the class for racing cars with displacement over 5 liters.

The first race victory was brought in September 1952 by John Fitch at the 200-mile race of Elkhart Lake. Fitch was the driver with the most wins with the C-4R. In total, he celebrated seven successes with this model.

The most important and significant overall victory was the success of Fitch and Walters in the 12-hour race at Sebring in 1953, the first sports car world championship race in motorsport history. Third finishes at the 1953 Reims 12 Hours and the Le Mans 24 Hours the following year are also worth mentioning.
