= Cunningham C-3 =

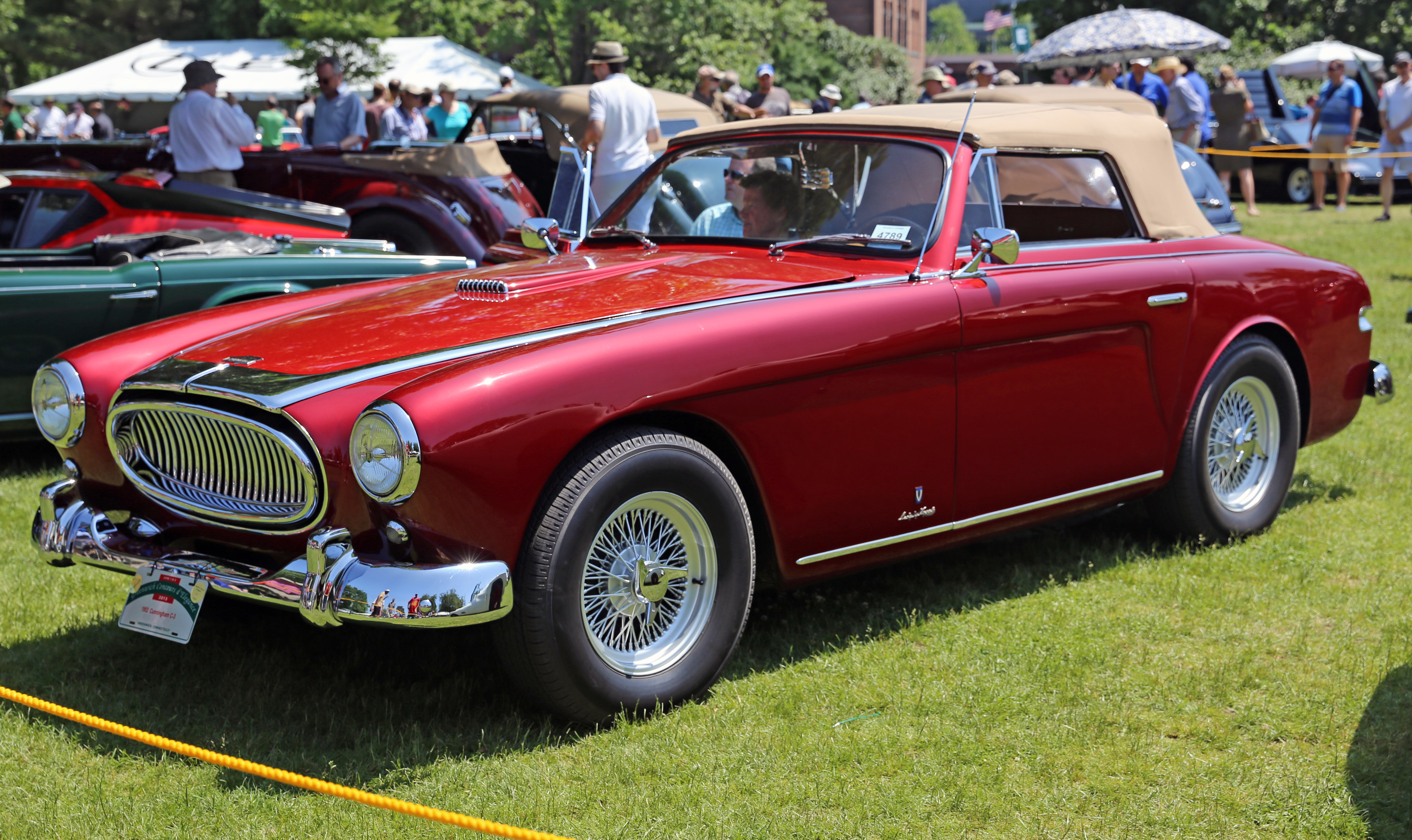

Overview
- Manufacturer: B. S. Cunningham Company
- Designer: Giovanni Michelotti for Bertone

Body and chassis
- Body style: Coupe; Cabriolet
- Layout: F/R
- Platform: Custom

Powertrain
- Engine: Chrysler Firepower V8
- Transmission: 3-speed Cadillac manual; 2-speed Chrysler Presto-Matic semi-automatic with electric overdrive

Chronology
- Predecessor: Cunningham C-2R
- Successor: Cunningham C-4R

The Cunningham C-3 is a Grand tourer, designed and built by the B. S. Cunningham Company beginning in 1952. Intended primarily as a road car, enough C3 were meant to be built to homologate Briggs Cunningham's racing cars, making them eligible to race at the 24 Hours of Le Mans.

== History ==
To have his namesake cars homologated as a manufacturer for Le Mans, Cunningham needed to build 25 examples of the C-3.

Two pre-production cars similar in appearance to the C-2Rs were built at the company's West Palm Beach location; a roadster with chassis number 5205, and a coupe with chassis number 5206X. A third chassis, number 5206, was sent to the workshops of carrozzeria Vignale in Turin, Italy, where it received a new coupe body styled by designer Giovanni Michelotti, then working at Vignale. The factory considered chassis 5026 the official prototype, and subsequent cars received the Michelotti body style.

Twenty-seven C-3s were built. One reference reports eighteen coupes and nine convertibles. Others report twenty coupes and five convertibles with bodies by Vignale, plus the two cars bodied at the West Palm Beach factory. While early factory pricing was US$8,000 (US$104,698 in 2024 dollars) for a Sports Convertible, and US$9,000 (US$117,785) for a Coupe, the cost of a C-3 had risen to US$15,000 (US$196,309) by 1951.

The New York Museum of Modern Art named the C-3 Continental Coupé one of the "10 Best Contemporary Automobiles".

When production of the C-3 ended, fourteen chassis in various states of completion remained. In 1955 during a disbursement of parts by Hilltop Trailer Sales, Chassis #5235 was purchased by Jack Shakespeare of Indiana. In 1957 subsequent owner John Hanley of Wisconsin commissioned a custom body designed by someone from Brooks Stevens Design Associates, which was fabricated by Bob Jones of Indianapolis.

== Technical details ==
The engine in the C-3 is the 331 cu in (5,424 cc) Chrysler FirePower V8 that Cunningham had first used in the C-2Rs, but now with a new intake manifold and four Zenith single-barrel carburetors, and a dual exhaust system. This raised power to 220 hp (164.1 kW) from the factory version's 180 hp (134.2 kW).

The majority of cars received one of two different transmissions offered; the first four cars had a three-speed manual from Cadillac, while subsequent cars used Chrysler's Presto-Matic semi-automatic fluid-coupled two-speed with electric overdrive, for an effective selection of four forward ratios. An exception was chassis 5223, which received a Chrysler PowerFlite transmission.

The C-3's large-diameter tube chassis was similar to that of the earlier C-2R, but the racing car's De Dion tube rear suspension was replaced by a coil-sprung live axle located by an upper and lower trailing arm on each side.

== Gallery ==
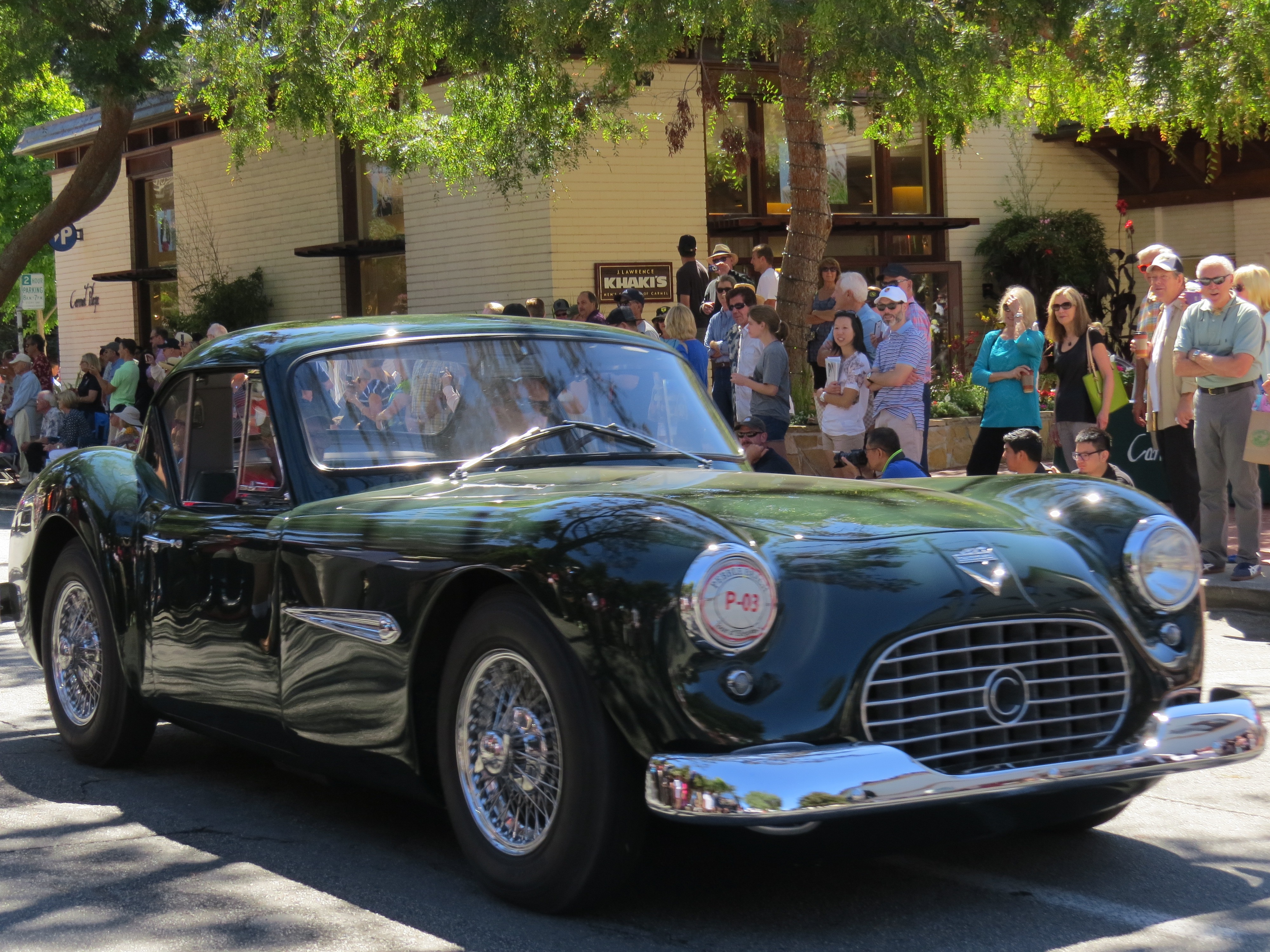
1951 prototype 5206X

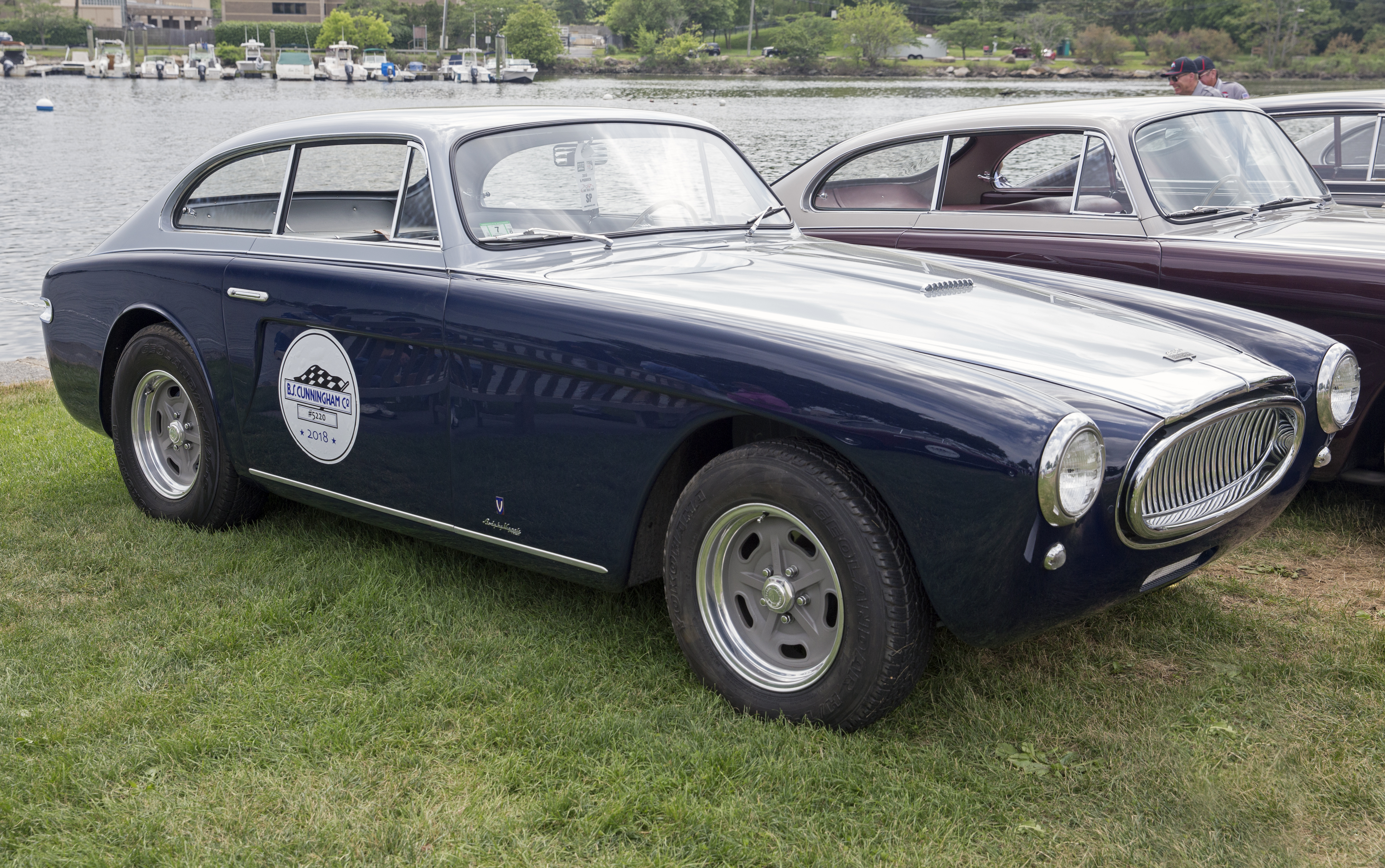
1952 C-3 Coupe

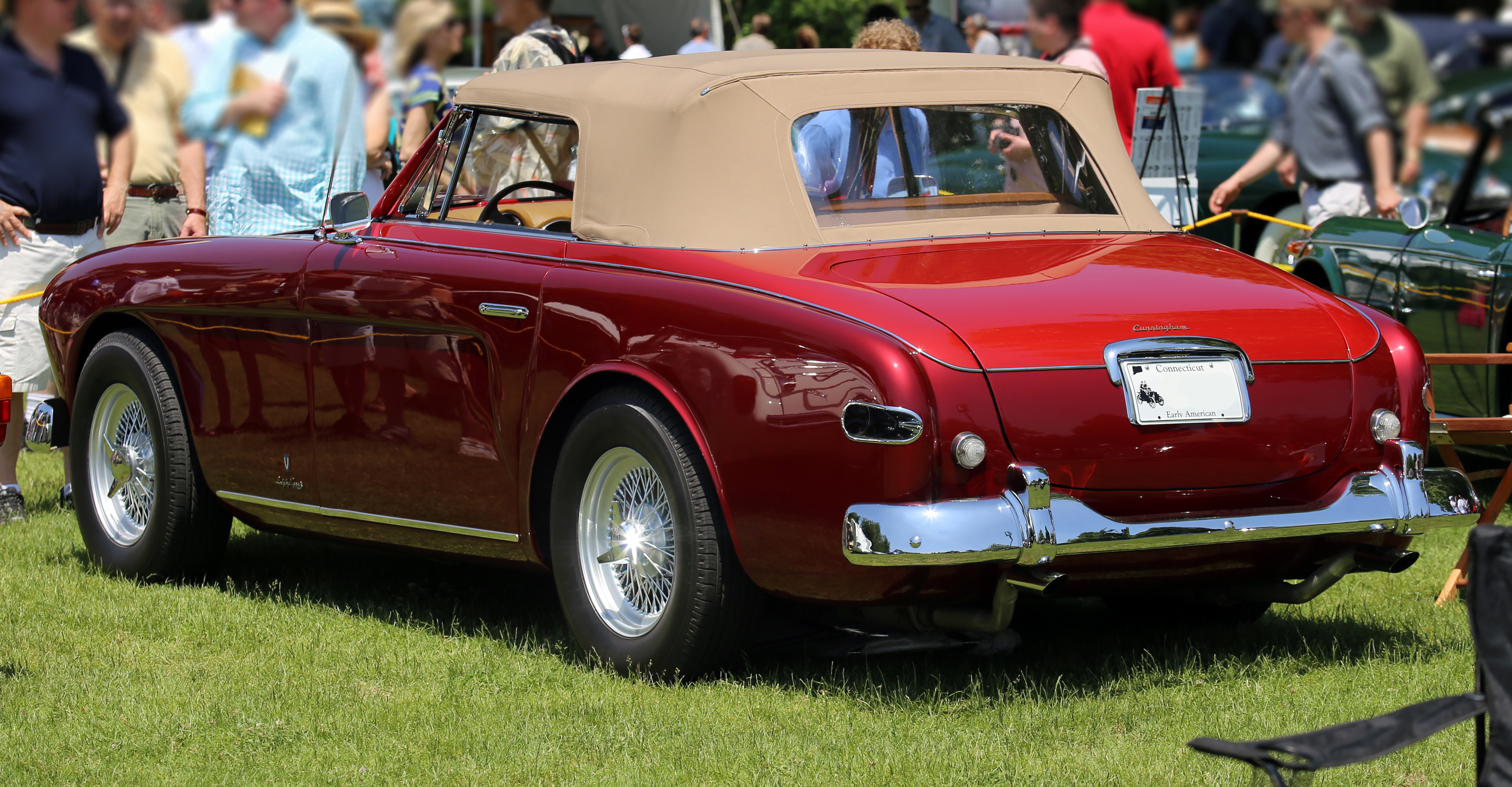
1953 Cabriolet, rear three-quarter view

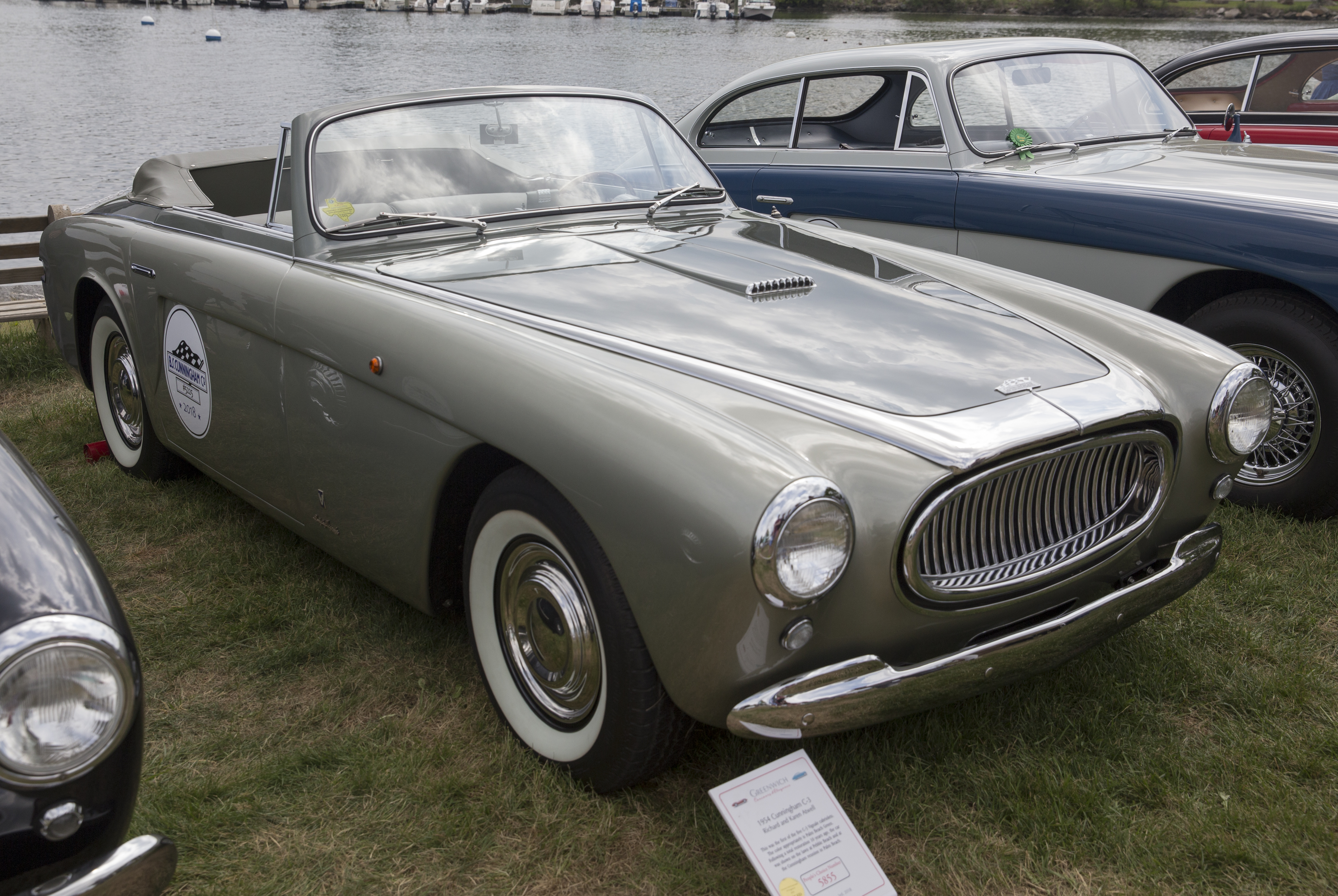
1954 C-3 Cabriolet

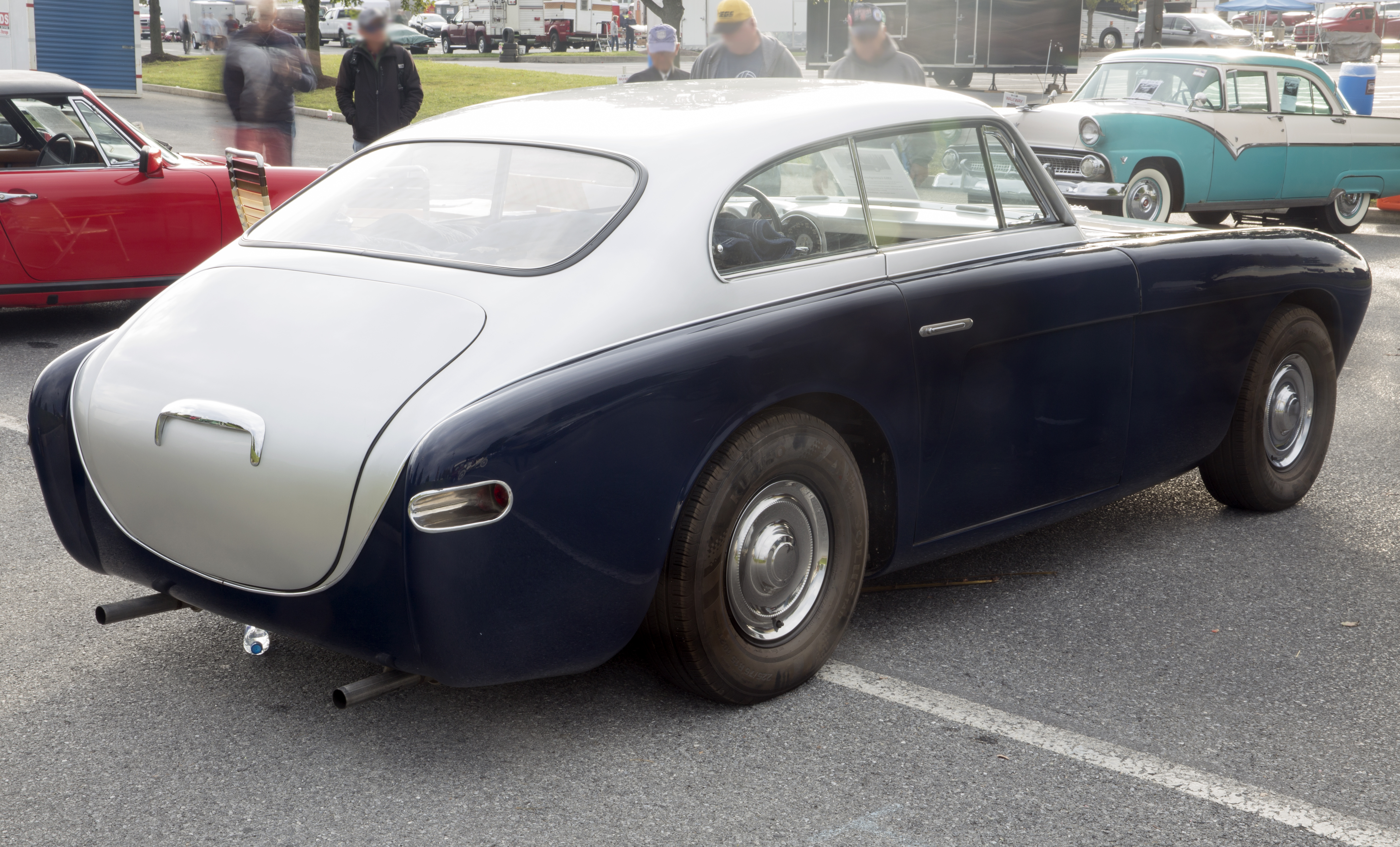
1954 Coupe, rear three-quarter view

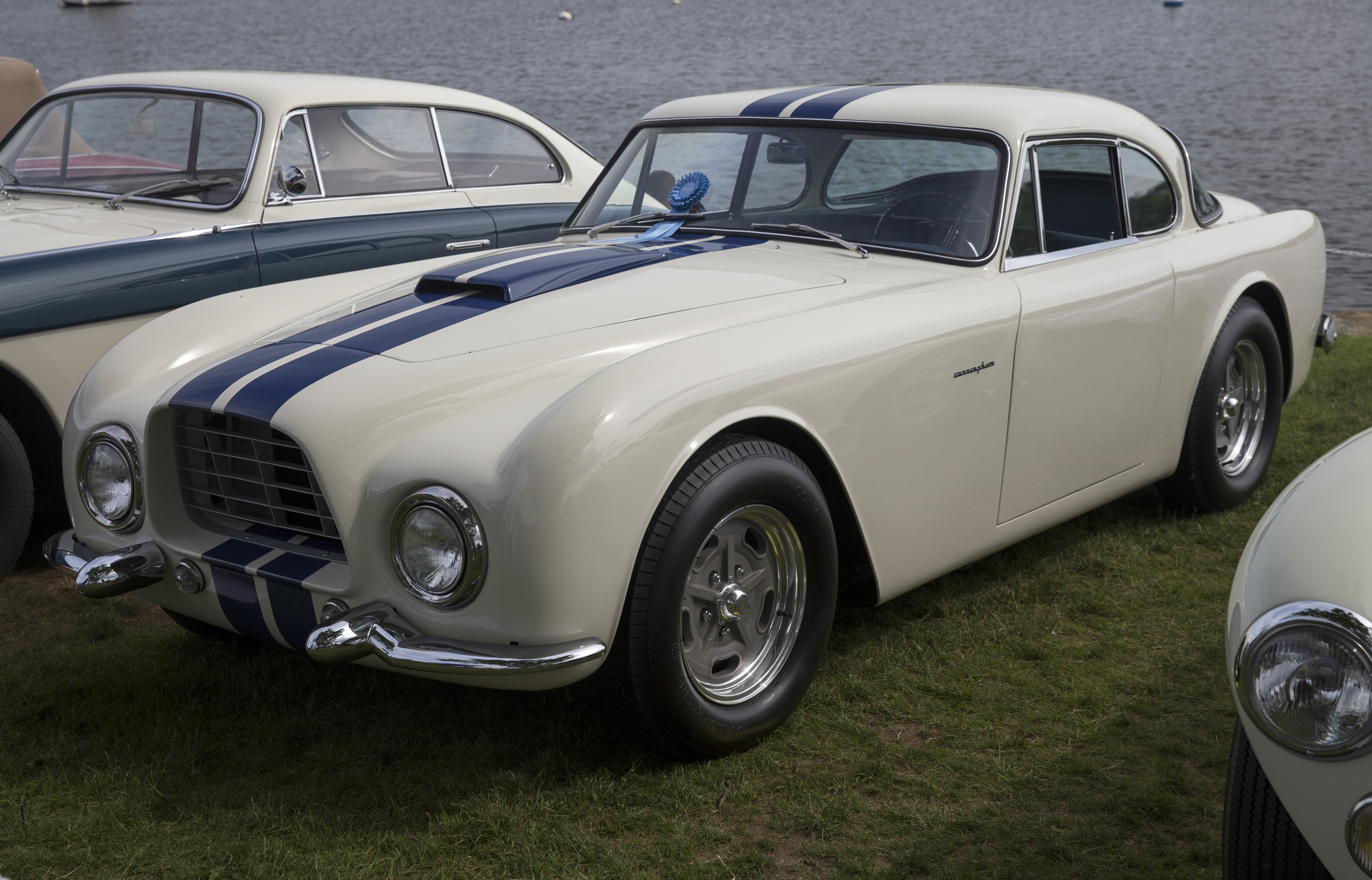
C-3 5235 by Brooks Stevens Design Associates
