= Cunningham C-1 =

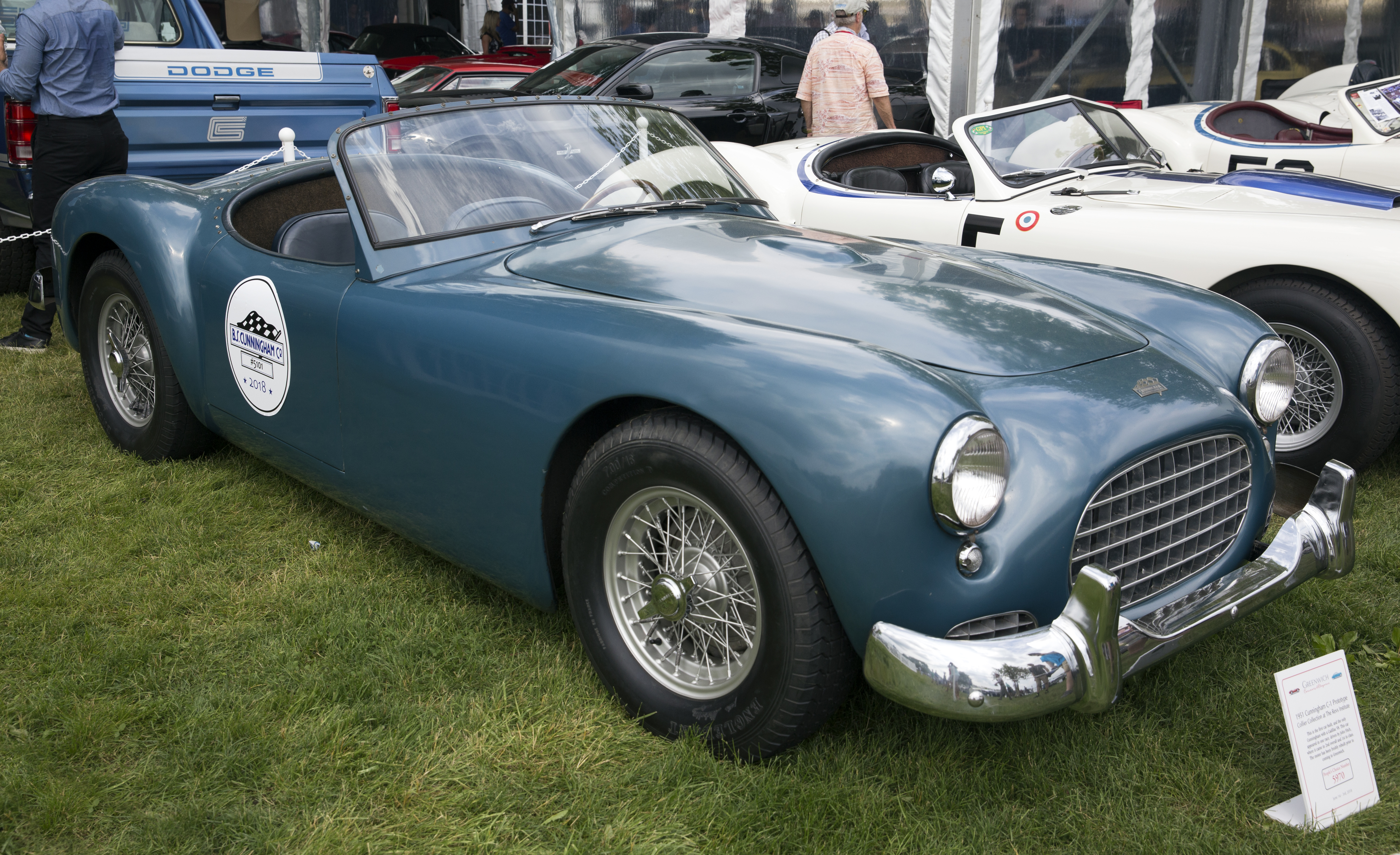

Overview
- Manufacturer: B. S. Cunningham Company
- Production: 1950
- Model years: 1951

Body and chassis
- Class: Sports car
- Body style: Roadster
- Layout: F/R
- Platform: Custom

Powertrain
- Engine: 331 cu in (5.4 L) Cadillac V8
- Transmission: 3-speed Cadillac manual

Chronology
- Successor: Cunningham C-2R

The Cunningham C-1 is a sports car that was designed and built by the B. S. Cunningham Company in 1950.

== Background ==
American sportsman Briggs Cunningham entered two cars based on the Cadillac Series 61 in the 1950 24 Hours of Le Mans. Brothers Cowles "Miles" Collier and Sam Collier partnered to drive a lightly modified car nicknamed "Petit Pataud", and finished in tenth place. Cunningham and co-driver Phil Walters were in another car with fully custom bodywork, dubbed "Le Monstre", and finished one place behind the other Cadillac in eleventh place.

In preparation for his next attempt at Le Mans, Cunningham bought the Frick-Tappett Motors company. The operation was moved from Long Island, New York to West Palm Beach, Florida, and renamed the "B. S. Cunningham Company".

The Cunningham C-1 roadster was the first product of the new company. On the design team were Cunningham, Walters, G. Briggs Weaver and Bob Blake. Only one C-1 was built, with serial number 5101. The car was completed in late 1950, and is generally listed as from the 1951 model year.

== Features ==
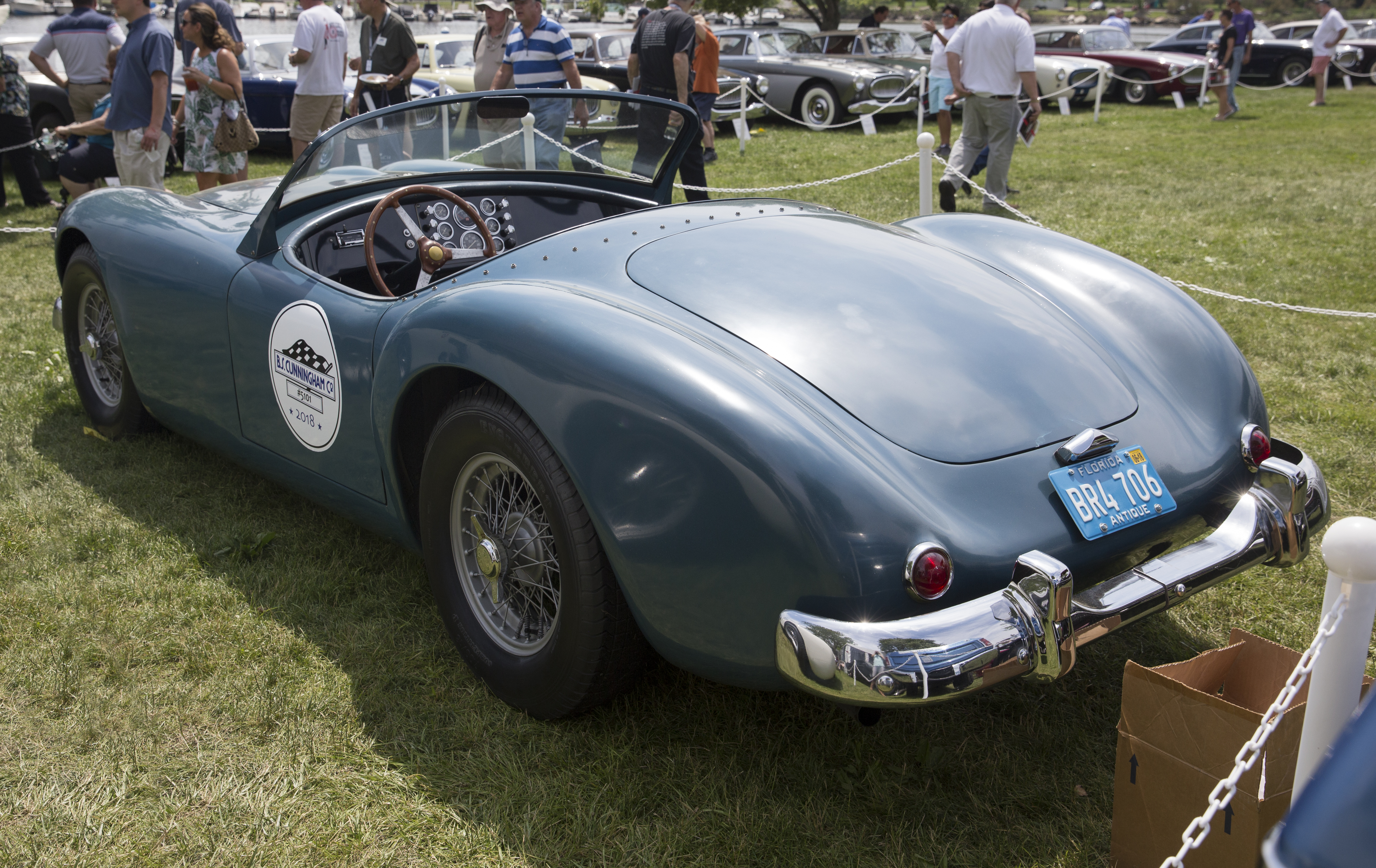
Rear three-quarter view

The chassis was made of 3 in (76 mm) steel tubing with a central X-brace. The rear suspension was a custom-made De Dion tube. The tires were mounted on knock-off wire wheels. Wheelbase was 105 in (2,667 mm), and the track front and rear was 58 in (1,473 mm). The engine was a 331 cu in (5,424 cc) Cadillac V8.

== Motorsports ==
The C-1 was used in practice at Le Mans, but did not race. In 1951 it appeared at the Mount Equinox hillclimb, where it finished fourth driven by John Fitch.
