= Cunningham C-5R =

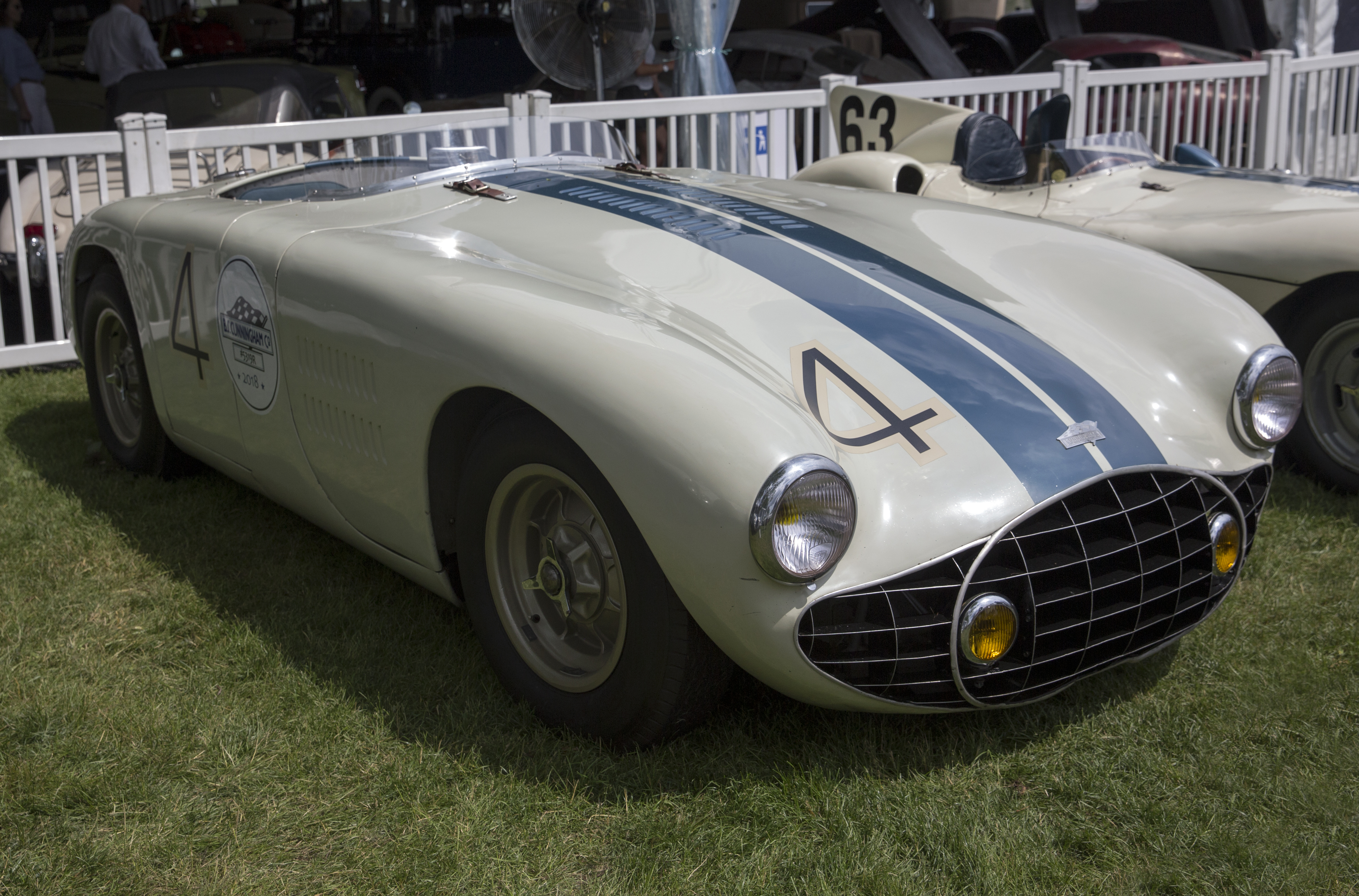

Overview
- Manufacturer: B. S. Cunningham Company

Body and chassis
- Body style: Coupe; Spyder
- Layout: F/R
- Platform: Custom

Powertrain
- Engine: Chrysler Firepower V8
- Transmission: 3-speed Cadillac manual

Chronology
- Predecessor: Cunningham C-4R
- Successor: Cunningham C-6R

The Cunningham C-5R was a sports car developed in 1953 for the Briggs Cunningham racing team.

== Design ==
The C-5R was the successor to the C-4R and was built for use in the 1953 24 Hours of Le Mans. The open sports car had a 331 cu in (5.4 L) Chrysler V8 engine, that developed 310 hp (230 kW) at 5200 rpm. The C-5R had a live axle at the front, which was carried over from the Kurtis Kraft - Indianapolis - Monoposto racing cars at the suggestion of Briggs Cunningham. There was torsion bar suspension front and rear. The vehicle had a tubular spaceframe chassis and an aluminum body.

== Racing history ==
As planned, the C-5R made its racing debut at the 1953 24 Hours of Le Mans. Cunningham had been coming to the Sarthe with his racing cars regularly since 1950 for long-distance races and had already been able to gain some experience. The team presented long-time works driver Phil Walters and John Fitch, another American, as drivers. Speed measurements were carried out at Le Mans for the first time and the C-5R was the fastest sports car on the Les Hunaudieres straight with a top speed of 249 km/h. The vehicle was also significantly faster than the two factory C-4R. In the race, only the factory C-Type Jaguar prevented a Cunningham triumph. Behind Tony Rolt and Duncan Hamilton, as well as Stirling Moss, Peter Walters and Fitch finished third overall. After the race, Briggs Cunningham complained about the lack of disc brakes on his race car. From his point of view, this was the reason for the defeat, since the C-Type already had this new braking system. The drum brakes of the C-5R kept getting too hot, a circumstance that forced the drivers to slow down as much as possible.

In its next race, at the 1953 12 Hours of Reims, the car was badly damaged after an accident, with John Fitch driving. The accident car was brought back to the US and rebuilt there. The effort to install disc brakes failed. Cunningham therefore concentrated on building the C-6R and in the meantime used racing cars from OSCA and Ferrari. The C-5R was still used in a few US sports car races and was sold to racing driver Charles Moran at the end of the year.
