= Cunningham C-6R =

Racing automobile

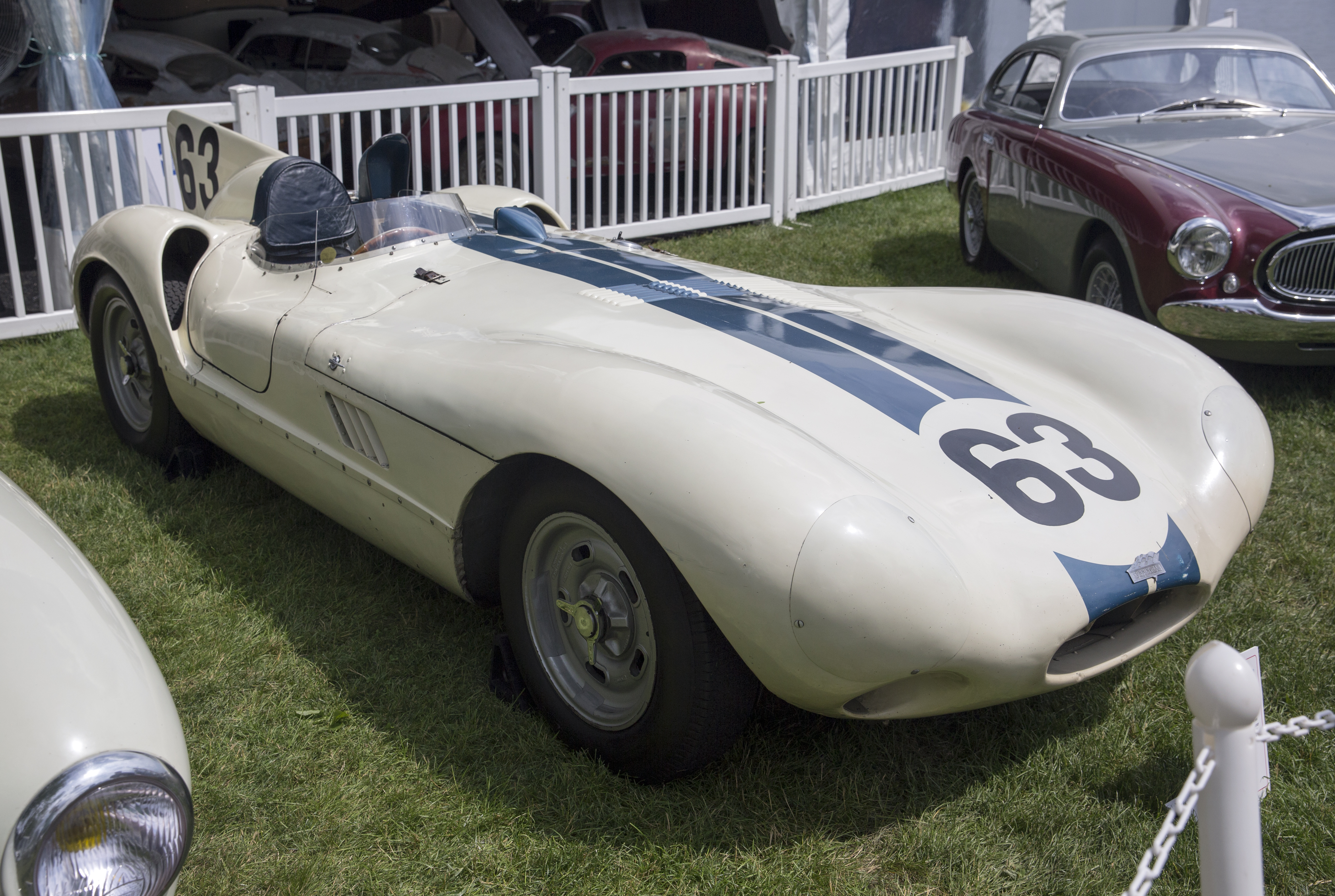

Overview
- Manufacturer: B. S. Cunningham Company

Body and chassis
- Body style: Coupe; Spyder
- Layout: F/R
- Platform: Custom

Powertrain
- Engine: Offenhauser Straight 4; Jaguar XK6 Straight 6
- Transmission: 4-speed ZF manual; 4-speed Jaguar D-Type manual

Chronology
- Predecessor: Cunningham C-5R

The Cunningham C-6R is a sports car developed in 1954 for the Briggs Cunningham racing team.

== Development history and technology ==
Primary responsibility for the chassis and body design of the C-6R fell to Unger. Engines considered for the car included a two-stroke inverted V-12 designed by Mercury Marine's Carl Kiekhaefer, and the Ferrari V-12 from the Italian marque's 375 MM.

The engine finally chosen was the 179.5 cu in (2,942 cc) four-cylinder Offenhauser from Meyer & Drake. After consulting with Leo Goossen, the engine's designer, Cunningham's team managed to get power output up to 270 hp (201.3 kW).

The transmission in the C-6R was a four-speed manual by ZF.

The car raced at Elkhart Lake a few months later, where the engine failed again. The Offy was then replaced by a Jaguar inline-six engine.

The C-6R was the last sports car built by Cunningham before the racing team made the full switch to Jaguar cars. Cunningham changed engine suppliers for the C-6R. The chassis was too narrow for the 5.5-liter Chrysler V8 engine still installed in the C-5R. The choice fell on a 3-liter, 4-cylinder unit from Offenhauser. The car featured conventional suspension, a De Dion rear axle, and a ZF four-speed quick shift gearbox. Striking was the tail fin behind the cockpit. Only one chassis of the C-6R was built.

== Racing history ==
The C-6R made its racing debut at the 1955 12 Hours of Sebring. The racing car was driven by Briggs Cunningham himself and John Gordon Bennett and retired just before half of the race after a gearbox failure. Victory in the race nevertheless went to Cunningham, since Mike Hawthorn and Phil Walters were the first to cross the finish line on a Jaguar D-Type that he had reported. Also at Le Mans - where Sherwood Johnston was Cunningham's partner - the C-6R failed after another gearbox failure. The only finishes Cunningham had at SCCA races were in 1957; the sports car was no longer used.

At the 1955 Le Mans the C-6R retired on lap 202. Second and third gears had failed, and the engine burned a piston, ending the car's run.

Briggs drove the car again at the Road America season-opener where the plucky Offy finally expired for good. The car sat dormant until 1957, when Alfred Momo installed a 3.8-litre Jaguar engine and transmission. Cunningham entered the car at Sebring and cracked a cylinder wall during practice. It later ran in a couple of SCCA events before being permanently retired, and is now in the Collier collection in Florida.
