= Briggs Cunningham =

American entrepreneur and sportsman (1907–2003)

- Born: Briggs Swift Cunningham II; January 19, 1907; Cincinnati, Ohio, US
- Died: July 2, 2003 (aged 96); Las Vegas, Nevada, US
- Other name: Mr. C
- Sports career
- Sport: Sailing
- College team: Yale University
- Wins: 7
- Poles: 3

Briggs Swift Cunningham II (January 19, 1907 – July 2, 2003) was an American entrepreneur and sportsman. He is best known for skippering the yacht Columbia to victory in the 1958 America's Cup race and for his efforts as a driver, team owner, and constructor in sports car racing, including the 24 Hours of Le Mans.

== Early years ==
Cunningham was born in Cincinnati, Ohio, on January 19, 1907. The family was long-time residents of the Cincinnati area. Cunningham's grandfather had been involved in operating river boats and shipping, then had gone into the meatpacking business with son Briggs Swift Cunningham, Sr. The meatpacking business was eventually known as Evans, Lippencott & Cunningham. Cunningham, Sr., later became founder and president of the Citizen's National Bank, as well as director of the Pennsylvania Railroad, among several others. He was also the chief financier of soap company Procter and Gamble. William Cooper Procter would be Cunningham's godfather.

Cunningham, Sr., died when Briggs was five years old. The estate was structured such that the Cunningham heirs did not receive full control of it until age 40.

Cunningham's maternal uncle was Dr. Ashton Heyl, a former Rough Rider. Heyl had installed a Hispano-Suiza aircraft engine in a Dodge touring car. As a boy, Cunningham was a passenger during some impromptu street races in the car with Heyl.

Cunningham's early schooling took place at Groton and the Hill School in Pottstown, Pennsylvania. His university days were spent at Yale. He was also a brakeman on the Olympic bobsled team.

On October 2, 1929, Cunningham married Lucie Bedford, the granddaughter of E.T. Bedford, a co-founder and director of Standard Oil. The couple spent an extended honeymoon in Europe, where Cunningham won a concours with a Mercedes Benz SS delivered to him personally by Rudolph Caracciola. Also during this trip, he attended his first major automobile race, the 1930 Monaco Grand Prix. When the couple returned to the US, they settled on Long Island.

During World War II (WWII), Cunningham tried to enlist in the US Navy, but was deemed ineligible due to a combination of age and a pre-existing condition. He instead joined the Civil Air Patrol, flying submarine patrols off the East Coast, first in a Fairchild and later a Sikorski S39B amphibious airplane, both paid for by himself.

== Sailing ==
By building and sailing his own ships, and building and racing his own cars, he epitomized the definition of the American sportsman.

— Sam Posey, former racing driver and journalist,

Owing to his mother's concerns about the dangers of automobile racing, Cunningham did not pursue a driving career until after her death, but did race sail boats competitively.

At 17, Cunningham joined the Pequot Yacht Club and began to race Star Class boats. He said that his wife was who taught him to sail.

Cunningham partnered with his father-in-law Frederick T. Bedford to purchase the 8-meter Loke in 1928.

In 1929, Cunningham bought the 6-meter Akaba, and renamed her Lucie — the first of two of his boats with that name. In 1930, Cunningham commissioned Clinton H. Crane to design a new 6-meter boat, also to be named Lucie. She was built at the Henry B. Nevins Boatyard in New York in 1931. He spent part of his honeymoon sailing the new Lucie. Cunningham won six world titles in 6-meter yachts.

F.T. Bedford commissioned the 12-meter Nyala as a gift for Cunningham and his daughter Lucie when they married.

In 1931, Cunningham was a crew member aboard the Dorade when she won the race around the Fastnet Rock.

In 1937, he was a member of the crew for Harold Stirling Vanderbilt on his yacht Vim.

Cunningham bought the schooner Brilliant from the Coast Guard after WW II, and modified her in an attempt to increase her speed. In 1953, he donated the Brilliant to the Mystic Seaport to be used as an off-shore classroom.

Brilliant was the first vessel to receive a Cunningham downhaul, an improved downhaul invented by Cunningham that has come to bear his name.

Cunningham was part of the syndicate that commissioned construction of the 12-meter sloop Columbia to contest the first postwar America's Cup race in 1958. The original choice to skipper Columbia in the America's Cup was Cornelius "Corny" Shields, but when he was sidelined by heart trouble, Cunningham stepped in and led the boat and crew to victory.

== Racing driver and team owner ==
Cunningham began racing internationally in 1930 with brothers Cowles "Miles" Collier and Sam Collier. These college friends of Cunningham's established the Automobile Racing Club of America (ARCA) in 1933, which became the Sports Car Club of America (SCCA) in 1944. Cunningham took part in the first ever SCCA race. He was described as one of the most successful drivers in SCCA racing at the time.

Cunningham became an early member of the Road Racing Drivers Club, an invitation-only group that honors drivers, officials, and journalists who have made significant contributions to the sport.

Cunningham's racing team arrived at the track accompanied by a large transporter that was both extensively and lavishly equipped, along with the drivers, a retinue of professionals and mechanics, and the cars. The team's chief mechanic was Alfredo Momo.

On December 31, 1950, Cunningham raced an Aston Martin DB2 in the 6-hour Sam Collier Memorial Race, the first automobile race held at the Sebring Airport race track. Cunningham finished third in class and 17th overall. His car, serial number LML/50/21, was one of the first, if not the first, DB2 Vantage built.

The year 1955 was the last that Cunningham built his own cars, the company having run out the five-year grace period that the Internal Revenue Service allowed low-volume manufacturers to become profitable.

Cunningham continued in international competition from 1930 until 1963, when he dissolved his Le Mans team. His final professional race was in a Porsche Carrera GTS (Type 904) at Sebring in 1966 with John Fitch and Davey Jordan. His last amateur race was in the same Porsche 904 at Riverside Raceway in September 1966.

== Cars ==
=== Sprint car ===
One of Cunningham's first racing cars, and his only sprint car, was the Number 5 Special. Built by R.T. Jackson of Dayton, Ohio, the car was driven by "Ed" Coffey.

The car had a custom frame and was powered by a Ford Model T inline four-cylinder engine with a 16-valve, double-overhead camshaft Frontenac "Fronty" cylinder head.

Cunningham owned the car in 1933, and the next year sold it to Gil Pirrung of Missouri.

=== Bu-Merc ===
This special was based on the chassis, drivetrain, and running gear of a 1939 Buick Century. Cunningham had Phil Shafer modify the car by lowering the Buick Straight-8 engine and moving it back in the chassis. The engine's compression ratio was raised. The body and radiator came from a wrecked Mercedes Benz SSK and were adapted to the Buick chassis by Byron Jersey.

In 1940, the Bu-Merc appeared at the Worlds Fair Grand Prix at the New York Fairgrounds. Driven by "Miles" Collier, it did not finish due to an accident.

Cunningham drove the Bu-Merc at the first Grand Prix held at Watkins Glen in 1948, where he finished second. After receiving a 1949 version of the Straight-8 and chassis modifications suggested by Buick's vice president of engineering Charles Chayne, the car appeared at Watkins Glen the next year, with Cunningham driving to a third-place finish.

=== Cadillac-Healey ===
In 1950, Cunningham raced a cycle-fendered Healey Silverstone in which he had one of Cadillac's new V8 engines installed. The car appeared at Palm Beach on January 3, 1950. Driven by Cunningham, it finished second.

On September 23 that year, the car was driven by Cunningham again at Watkins Glen, and finished second. At this race, Samuel "Sam" Carnes Collier was killed while driving Cunningham's Ferrari. The Cadillac-Healey also appeared at the 6 Hours of Sebring on December 31, 1950. Co-driven by Phil Walters and Bill Frick, it finished 12th overall and third in class.

=== Le Mans ===
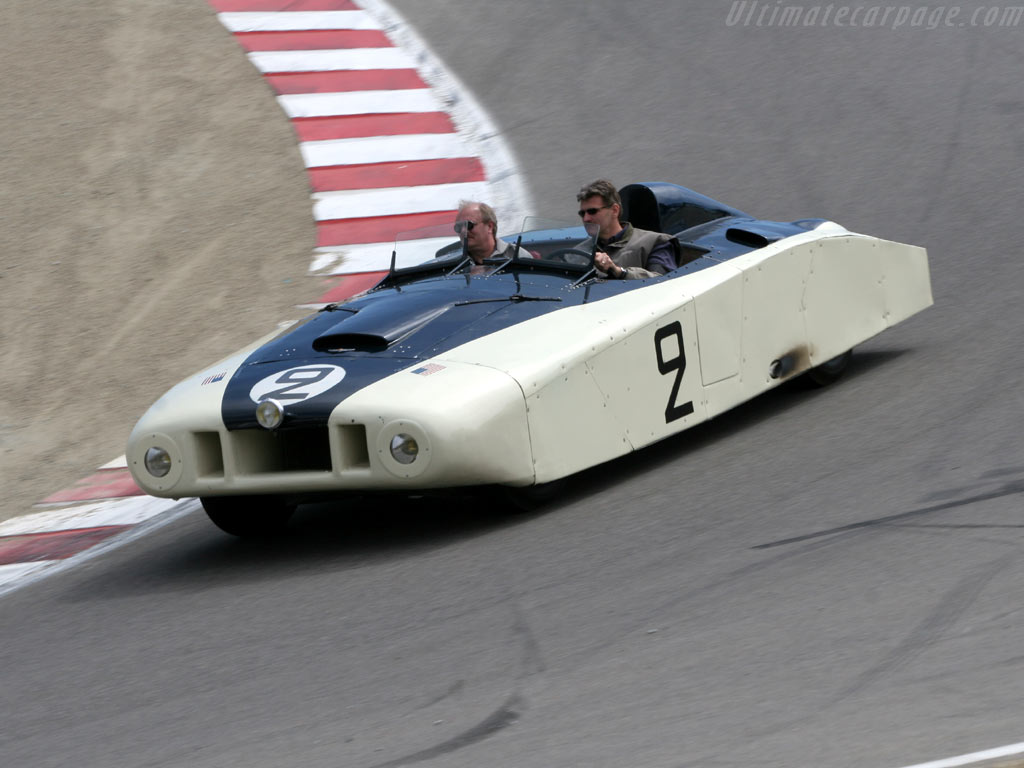
Cunningham Le Monstre

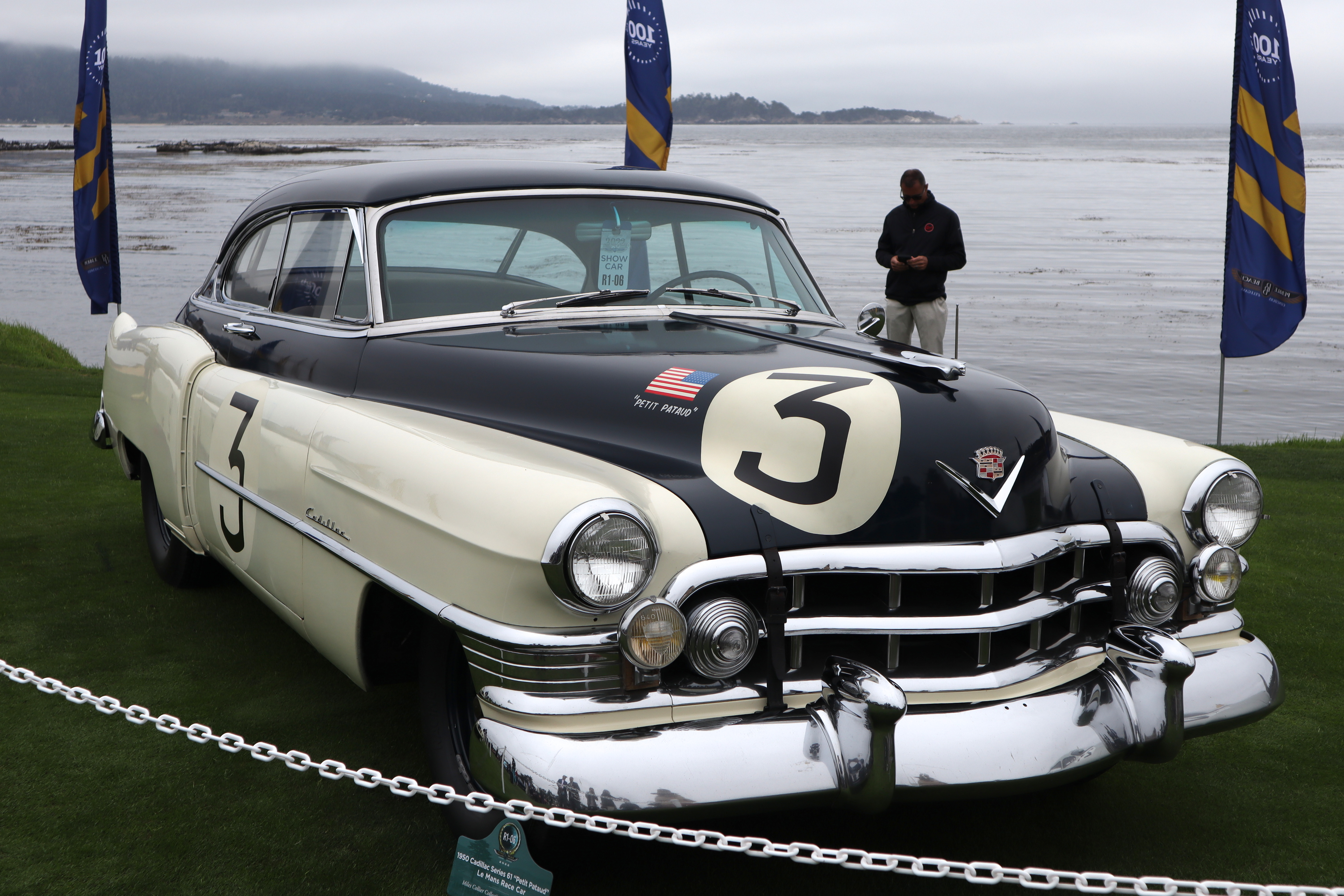
Cadillac Series 61 Petit Pataud

When his plan to enter a Fordillac hybrid in the 1950 24 Hours of Le Mans was rejected by the organizers, Cunningham entered two Cadillacs, instead.

The first was a stock-appearing Cadillac Series 61 that the French dubbed Petit Pataud, possibly a reference to a puppy in a French children's book from the 1930s. Changes to the car were minimal and included a dual-carburetor intake manifold, brake-cooling ducts, a second fuel tank, and extra lights.

While engine swaps were illegal, body modifications were permitted, so a second Cadillac had its stock body removed and an entirely new body that was lower and narrower than the original fabricated in aluminum over a metal tube framework. The new body was designed and built with the help of engineer Howard Weinmann from Grumman. Another feature was the use of five carburetors. This car was nicknamed Le Monstre.

The Collier brothers partnered to drive Petit Pataud and finished in 10th place. Cunningham and co-driver Phil Walters were in Le Monstre and finished 11th.

=== B. S. Cunningham Company cars ===
To prepare for his next attempt at Le Mans, Cunningham bought the Frick-Tappet Motors company and relocated the operation from Long Island, New York, to West Palm Beach, Florida, renaming it the B.S. Cunningham Company.

The first product of the new company was the Cunningham C-1, powered by a 331 cu in (5,424 cc) Cadillac V8. Only one was built. Very similar to the C-1 were the three subsequent C-2Rs, all built to racing specifications. Cunningham substituted a 331 cu in (5,424 cc) Chrysler FirePower V8 for the Cadillac in the C-1. The C-2R first appeared at Le Mans in 1951.

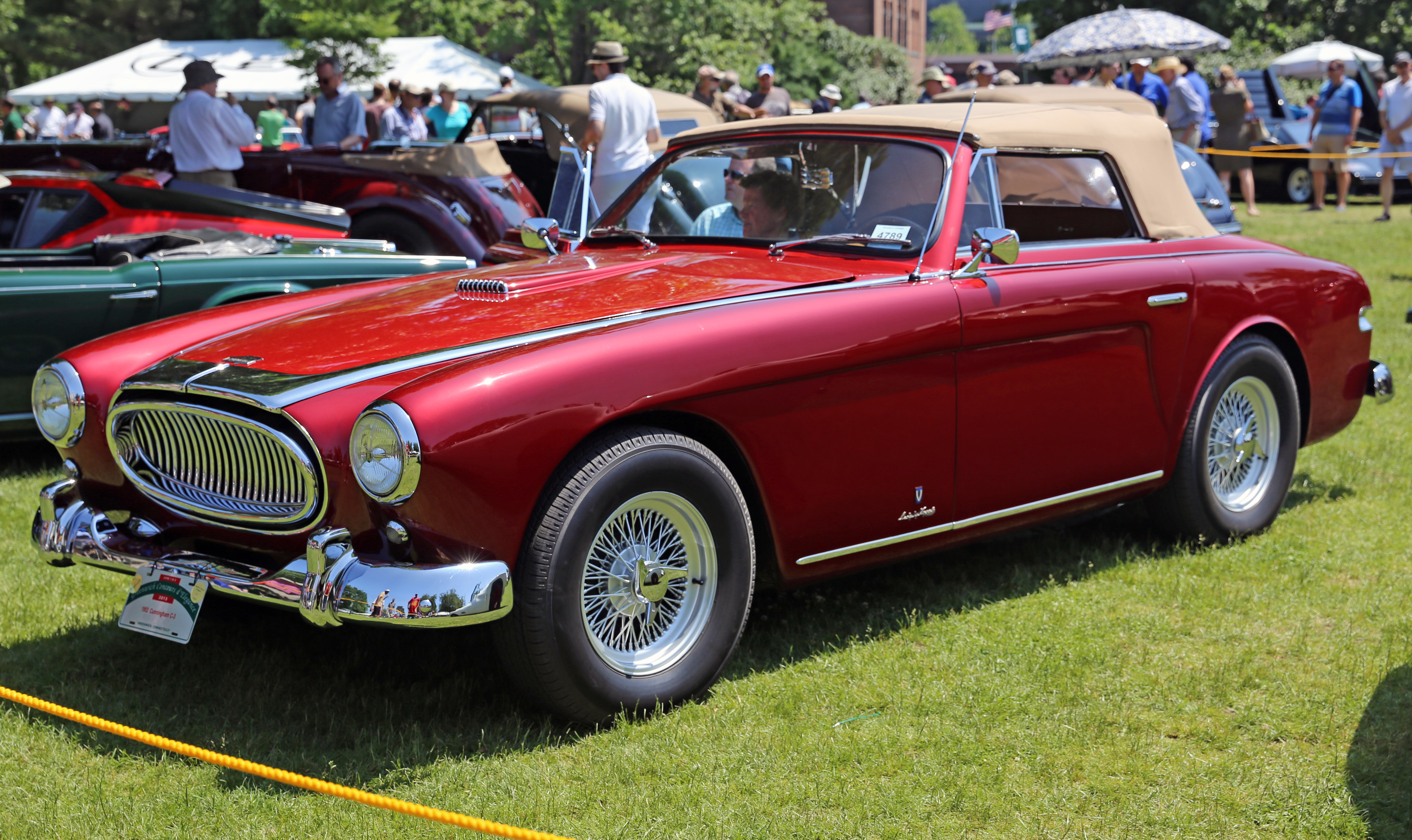
1953 Cunningham C-3 Cabriolet

To be homologated as a manufacturer for Le Mans, Cunningham undertook to build 25 examples of the C-3 road car. The C-3s used an upgraded version of the Chrysler FirePower V8. Production of the C-3 is variously reported to have been 25 (20 coupes and five convertibles) or 27 (18 coupes and 9 convertibles).

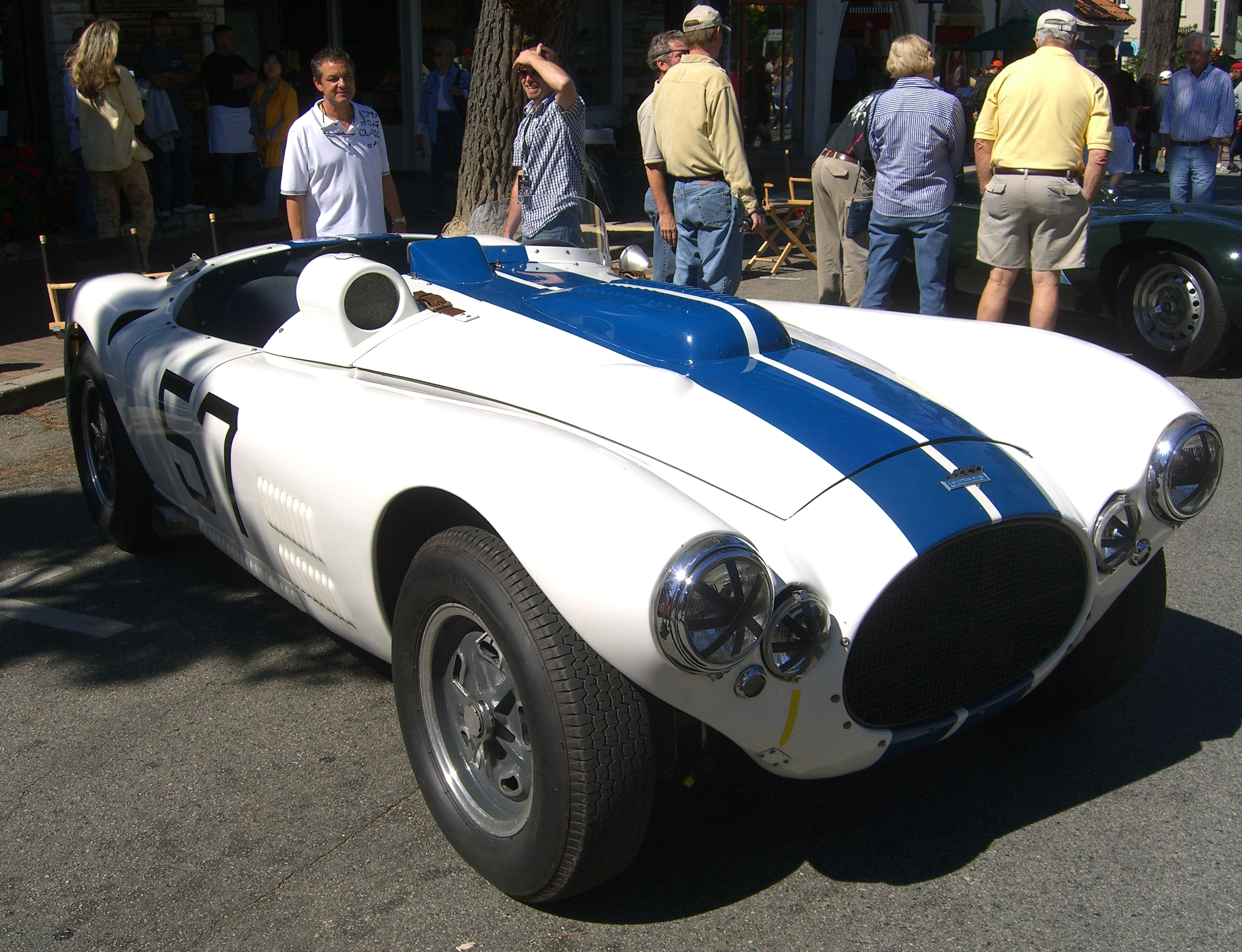
Cunningham C-4R

The next racing car for the B.S. Cunningham Company was designed by G. Briggs Weaver. Two C-4R roadsters were built, as well as a single C-4RK coupe with truncated rear bodywork. The cars debuted at the 1952 24 Hours of Le Mans.

For 1953, a single all-new C-5R was prepared for Le Mans. The Chrysler V8 engine remained, with power increased by 10 hp (7.5 kW). When the car arrived for the 1953 Le Mans, French observers named it Le Requin Souriant — the Smiling Shark.

The final B. S. Cunningham company car model abandoned the Chrysler V8 for a 3.0 L, four-cylinder Offenhauser from Meyer and Drake. At the 1955 Le Mans the C-6R retired on lap 202.

=== Other marques ===
Among the earliest cars that Cunningham raced or lent to race was a series of MGs. In 1934, he owned an MG J2 that he personally drove in select ARCA events. Two years later, he lent his MG K3 Magnette to "Miles" Collier and George Rand, who campaigned it in Europe. Cunningham's supercharged MG TC appeared alongside the Bu-Merc at the inaugural Watkins Glen Grand Prix in 1948. Driven by Haig Ksayian, the TC finished first in class and third overall.

Cunningham had originally planned to enter a team of "Fordillacs" at Le Mans. The cars were 1949 Fords with Cadillac OHV V8s installed. The conversion had been designed by Bill Frick and was built by Frick-Tappet Motors.

In 1949, Cunningham partnered with Alfredo Momo and bought Ferrari 166 Spider Corsa 016-I from Luigi Chinetti. This was the second Ferrari in the US, the first being a Tipo 166 MM Touring Barchetta, chassis 0002 M, sold to Tommy Lee in Los Angeles in the first quarter of 1949. The 016-I was the first Ferrari raced in the US.

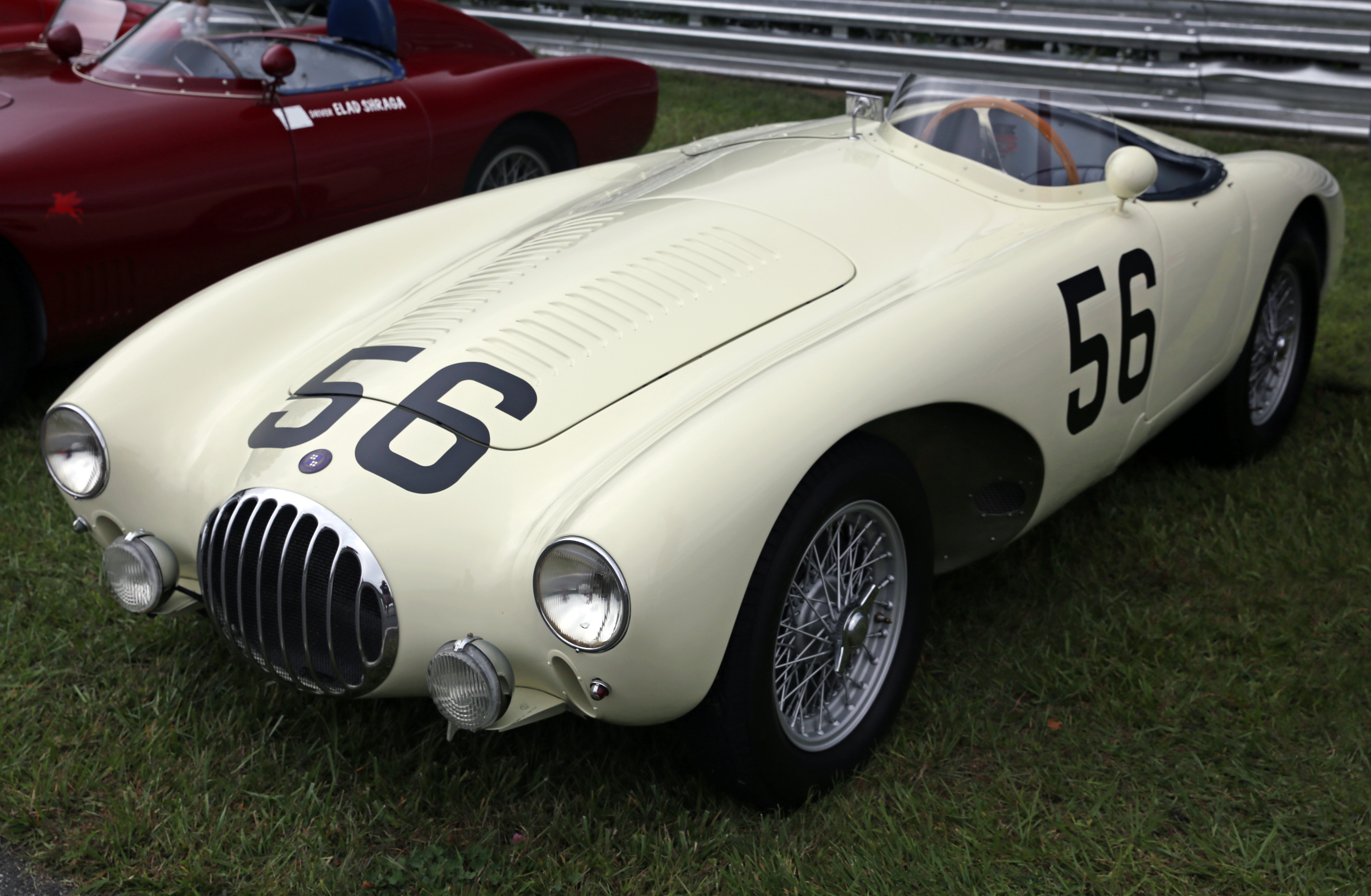
Cunningham O.S.C.A. MT4

In 1954, Cunningham's 1.5-liter O.S.C.A. MT4 driven by Stirling Moss and Bill Lloyd was the outright winner of the 12 Hours of Sebring. The team won at Sebring again the following year, this time with a Jaguar D-Type.

Cunningham entered a 750 cc Stanguellini in the 1954 race at Watkins Glen, with driver Marshall Lewis. The car won its H Modified class, while John Gordon Bennett was second in a Cunningham O.S.C.A. MT4 1450.

At the 1954 24 Hours of Le Mans, Cunningham fielded a Ferrari 375 MM with experimental water-cooled drum brakes. The car retired.

Cunningham owned three Maserati 300S cars. Chassis 3053 finished third overall on its debut race at the 1955 12 Hours of Sebring, driven by Bill Spear and Sherwood Johnston.

In 1958, Cunningham fielded two Lister-Jaguar "Knobbly"s. Prepared by Alfredo Momo, the pair delivered an SCCA C Modified championship in 1958.

In 1959, Cunningham upgraded to the Lister-Costin, still Jaguar-powered, but with revised bodywork by aerodynamicist Frank Costin. The result was another SCCA C Modified championship.

For 1960, the displacement rules for Le Mans were changed to permit cars with engines larger than 3.0 L. With GM's tacit support and with assistance from Zora Arkus-Duntov, Cunningham began preparing a trio of Corvettes for the race. As a trial before Le Mans, two Momo-prepared Cunningham Corvettes were entered in the 1960 12 Hours of Sebring, but neither car finished. At Le Mans, Cunningham entered three Corvettes and one Jaguar E-Type. Drivers for the cars were Cunningham and Bill Kimberley in the #1 Corvette, Dick Thompson and Fred Windridge in the #2 Corvette, John Fitch and Bob Grossman in the #3 Corvette, and Dan Gurney and Walt Hansgen in the Jaguar. The #1 Corvette driven by Kimberly went off the course and caught fire on lap 32, and the #2 car went out with engine trouble on lap 89, as did the Jaguar. The #3 car began to overheat, and the pit crew packed ice around the engine to cool it. It finished in eighth place overall, with a fifth place in the GT category and first in the GT up to 5.0 class.

In August 1960, Cunningham bought a Maserati Tipo 60 "Birdcage", that he drove in the 1961 24 Hours of Le Mans with co-driver Jim Kimberly. The pair finished eighth overall and third in class.

Cunningham also owned two different Stanguellini Formula Junior cars, a front-engined 750 cc car and a rear-engined 1100 "Delfino".

In October 1961, a Cooper T53 owned by Cunningham appeared in the US Grand Prix. The entrant of record is the Momo Corporation, and the car was driven by Walt Hansgen, who crashed on lap 14 of his F1 debut. The chassis was later sold to Roger Penske and became the Zerex Special, then was resold to Bruce McLaren and became the first car raced by the McLaren team.

A Fiat-Abarth 1000 Bialbero Competition coupe owned by Cunningham, prepared by Alfredo Momo's Momo Corporation, and driven by Bruce McLaren, won the 1961 3 Hours of Sebring for Grand Touring cars up to 1 L.

Cunningham entered two Maserati Tipo 151 coupes in the 1962 Le Mans, along with a Jaguar E-Type. Both Maseratis failed to finish.

For the 1963 Le Mans, Cunningham entered a Jaguar E-Type Lightweight that he drove to a ninth-place finish.

In 1964, Cunningham was co-owner and co-driver with Lake Underwood in a class-winning Porsche 904 at Sebring. The next year, they won the 2-liter class and finished ninth overall with a 904.

== Museum ==
Over the course of his life, Cunningham amassed a large and varied collection of automobiles, including many of his own former racing cars. After relocating to the West Coast, he purchased a property at 250 E. Baker Street, Costa Mesa, California, and established the Briggs Cunningham Museum to house his collection. A 40,000 sq ft (3,716.1 m^{2}) building became the museum gallery, which opened officially on February 5, 1966.

The museum was in operation for 21 years. Expected changes to capital-gains tax laws prompted Cunningham to consider closing the museum in late 1986. Instead, the 71 cars, including a Bugatti Royale, in the museum collection were sold to Miles Collier, the son of long-time friend Cowles "Miles" Collier, and relocated to Naples, Florida, as the Collier Automotive Museum Collection. The Collier Collection later became part of the Revs Institute display.

== Personal life ==
Cunningham was featured on the April 26, 1954, cover of Time magazine, along with three Cunningham racing cars.

Cunningham died in Las Vegas at the age of 96 from complications of Alzheimer's disease. He was survived by former wife Lucie Bedford Warren and their three children, Briggs Swift Cunningham III, Lucie McKinney (wife of United States Representative Stewart McKinney), and Cythlen Maddock. He was also survived by his second wife Laura Cramer Cunningham and two step-sons. His grandchildren include former Connecticut State Senate Minority Leader John P. McKinney.

== Legacy and honors ==
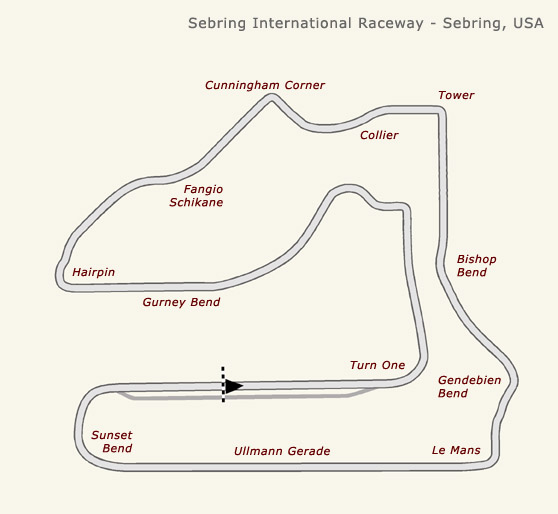
Sebring International Raceway: Cunningham Corner at top center

- "Cunningham Corner" at Sebring International Raceway is named for Cunningham and his team.
- In 1981, Cunningham was the first American marque to be featured at the Monterey Historic Automobile Races.
- Cunningham and his cars were honored at the 1981 Pebble Beach Concours d'Elegance.
- In 1993, he was inducted into the America's Cup Hall of Fame at the Herreshoff Marine Museum in Bristol, R.I.
- In 1997, he was inducted into the Motorsports Hall of Fame of America.
- Cunningham was inducted into the International Motorsports Hall of Fame in 2003.
- In 2013, an athletic field at the Hill School was named in honor of both Briggs Cunningham II (class of 1924) and Briggs Cunningham III (class of 1950).
- The Cunningham (sailing) downrig system used in most modern racing sailboats

== Racing record ==
=== Le Mans results ===
Year	Team	Co-driver	Car	Class	Laps	Pos.	Class Pos.
1950	(United States) Briggs Cunningham	(United States) Phil Walters	Cunningham "Le Monstre" Spider	S 8.0	232	11th	
1951	(United States) Briggs Cunningham	(United States) George Huntoon	Cunningham C-2R	S 8.0	223	DNF	
1952	(United States) Briggs Cunningham	(United States) Bill Spear	Cunningham C-4R	S 8.0	252	4th	1st
1953	(United States) Briggs Cunningham	(United States) Bill Spear	Cunningham C-4R	S 8.0	299	7th	
1954	(United States) Briggs Cunningham	(United States) John Gordon Bennett	Cunningham C-4R	S 8.0	283	5th	
1955	(United States) Briggs Cunningham	(United States) Sherwood Johnston	Cunningham C-6R	S 3.0	196	DNF	
1960	(United States) Briggs Cunningham	(United States) William Kimberly	Chevrolet Corvette	GT 5.0	32	DNF	
1961	(United States) Briggs Cunningham	(United States) William Kimberly	Maserati Tipo 60	S 2.0	303	8th	
1962	(United States) Briggs Cunningham	(United Kingdom) Roy Salvadori	Jaguar E-Type FHC	GT +3.0	310	4th	1st
1963	(United States) Briggs S. Cunningham	(United States) Bob Grossman	Jaguar E-Type Lightweight	GT +3.0	283	9th	

=== 12 Hours of Sebring results ===
Year	Team	Co-driver(s)	Car	Class	Lap	Pos.	Class Pos.
1952	(United States) William Spear	(United States) Bill Spear	Ferrari 340 America			DNF	
1953	(United States) Briggs Cunningham	(United States) Bill Lloyd	OSCA MT4 1350	S1.5	153	5th	1st
1954	(United States) Briggs Cunningham	(United States) Sherwood Johnston	Cunningham C-4R	S8.0	104	DNF	
1955	(United States) B. S. Cunningham	(United States) John Gordon Bennett	Cunningham C-6R	S3.0	54	DNF	
1956	(United States) Briggs Cunningham	(United States) John Gordon Bennett	Jaguar D-Type	S5.0	168	12th	
1957	(United States) Briggs Cunningham	(United States) Bill Lloyd	Jaguar D-Type	S5.0	2	DNF	
1958	(United States) Alfred Momo	(United States) Walt Hansgen	Jaguar D-Type	GT3.0	16	DNF	
1959	(United States) Briggs Cunningham	(United States) Lake Underwood (United States) Russ Boss	Lister	S3.0	164	15th	
1960	(United States) Jaguar Distributors of New York	(United States) John Fitch	Chevrolet Corvette	GT5.0	27	DNF	
1961	(United States) Momo Corporation	(United States) William Kimberly	Maserati Tipo 60	S2.0	171	19th	
1962	(United States) Briggs Cunningham	(United States) John Fitch	Jaguar E-Type			14th	1st
1963	(United States) Briggs Cunningham	(United States) John Fitch	Jaguar E-Type			DNF	
1964	(United States) Briggs Cunningham	(United States) Lake Underwood	Porsche 904 GTS			9th	1st
1965	(United States) Briggs Cunningham	(United States) John Fitch (United States) Bill Bencker	Porsche 904 GTS			20th	
1966	(United States) Briggs Cunningham	(United States) John Fitch (United States) Dave Jordan	Porsche 904 GTS	S2.0	148	DNF	

=== World Sportscar Championship results ===
Season	Team	Race car	1	2	3	4	5	6	7	8	9	10	11	12	13	14	15	16	17	18	19	20	21	22
1953	Briggs Cunningham	Osca MT4 Cunningham C-4R	SEB	MIM	LEM	SPA	NÜR	RTT	CAP															
1953	Briggs Cunningham	Osca MT4 Cunningham C-4R	5		7																			
1954	Briggs Cunningham	Cunningham C-4R	BUA	SEB	MIM	LEM	RTT	CAP																
1954	Briggs Cunningham	Cunningham C-4R		DNF		5																		
1955	Briggs Cunningham	Cunningham C-6R	BUA	SEB	MIM	LEM	RTT	TAR																
1955	Briggs Cunningham	Cunningham C-6R		DNF		DNF																		
1956	Briggs Cunningham	Jaguar D-Type	BUA	SEB	MIM	NÜR	KRI																	
1956	Briggs Cunningham	Jaguar D-Type		12																				
1957	Briggs Cunningham	Jaguar D-Type	BUA	SEB	MIM	NÜR	LEM	KRI	CAR															
1957	Briggs Cunningham	Jaguar D-Type		DNF																				
1958	Briggs Cunningham	Jaguar D-Type	BUA	SEB	TAR	NÜR	LEM	RTT																
1958	Briggs Cunningham	Jaguar D-Type		DNF																				
1959	Briggs Cunningham	Lister	SEB	TAR	NÜR	LEM	RTT																	
1959	Briggs Cunningham	Lister	15																					
1960	Jaguar Distributors of New York Briggs Cunningham	Chevrolet Corvette	BUA	SEB	TAR	NÜR	LEM																	
1960	Jaguar Distributors of New York Briggs Cunningham	Chevrolet Corvette		DNF			DNF																	
1961	Momo Corporation	Maserati Tipo 60	SEB	TAR	NÜR	LEM	PES																	
1961	Momo Corporation	Maserati Tipo 60	19			8																		
1962	Briggs Cunningham	Jaguar E-Type	DAY	SEB	SEB	MAI	TAR	BER	NÜR	LEM	TAV	CCA	RTT	NÜR	BRI	BRI	PAR							
1962	Briggs Cunningham	Jaguar E-Type			14					4														
1963	Briggs Cunningham	Jaguar E-Type	DAY	SEB	SEB	TAR	SPA	MAI	NÜR	CON	ROS	LEM	MON	WIS	TAV	FRE	CCE	RTT	OVI	NÜR	MON	MON	TDF	BRI
1963	Briggs Cunningham	Jaguar E-Type			DNF							9												12
1964	Briggs Cunningham	Porsche 904	DAY	SEB	TAR	MON	SPA	CON	NÜR	ROS	LEM	REI	FRE	CCE	RTT	SIM	NÜR	MON	TDF	BRI	BRI	PAR		
1964	Briggs Cunningham	Porsche 904		9																				
1965	Briggs Cunningham	Porsche 904	DAY	SEB	BOL	MON	MON	RTT	TAR	SPA	NÜR	MUG	ROS	LEM	RIE	BOZ	FRE	CCE	OVI	NÜR	BRI	BRI		
1965	Briggs Cunningham	Porsche 904		20																				
1966	Briggs Cunningham	Porsche 904	DAY	SEB	MON	TAR	SPA	NÜR	LEM	MUG	CCE	HOK	SIM	NÜR	ZEL									
1966	Briggs Cunningham	Porsche 904		DNF																				
