= Ford Shelby GR-1 =

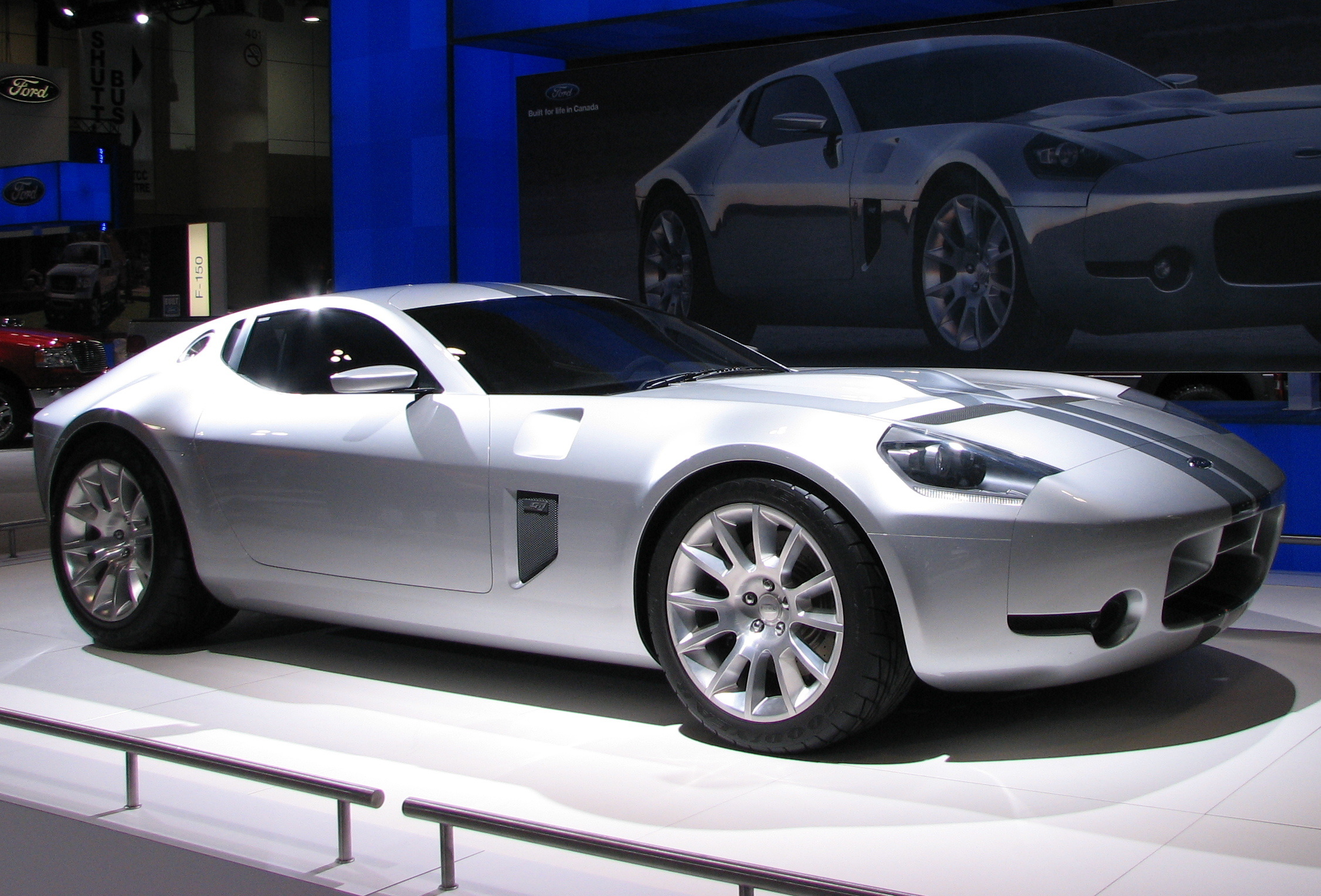

Overview
- Production: 1 unit produced
- Model years: 2005
- Assembly: Wixom, Michigan, United States
- Designer: George Saridakis; J Mays

Body and chassis
- Class: Concept car
- Body style: 2-door coupe
- Layout: FR layout
- Doors: Butterfly

Powertrain
- Engine: 6.4 L Modular Prototype V10
- Transmission: 6-speed manual

Dimensions
- Wheelbase: 2,540 mm (100 in)
- Length: 4,412 mm (174 in)
- Width: 1,895 mm (75 in)
- Height: 1,168 mm (46 in)
- Curb weight: 3,900 lb (1,769 kg)

The Ford Shelby GR-1 is a concept car developed and manufactured by Ford. It was first introduced to the public at the 2004 Pebble Beach Concours d'Elegance as a clay model. A fully functional concept was revealed at the 2005 North American International Auto Show. The GR-1 was inspired by and bears resemblance to the Shelby Daytona.

Much of the GR-1 chassis and running gear is based on the Ford Shelby Cobra Concept, a modern version of the 1960s original Shelby Cobra, which was presented one year earlier at the 2004 North American International Auto Show. As with the Ford Shelby Cobra Concept, the GR-1 project was led by Manfred Rumpel and developed by Ford's Advanced Product Creation group.

The GR-1 uses a 6.4L all-aluminum V10 engine and uses some components from the Ford GT. The GR-1 is officially rated at 605 hp (451 kW) and 501 lb⋅ft (679 N⋅m) of torque. It uses a 6-speed manual transmission. The GR-1 can accelerate from 0–60 mph (97 km/h) in 3.9 seconds and has a projected top speed of approximately 190 mph (306 km/h).

In early January 2019, Superformance announced they will be building a limited production run of the GR-1 concept, featuring a 700+ bhp supercharged V8, as Ford didn't make any suitable production V10's, other than for their commercial truck fleet.

== Gallery ==
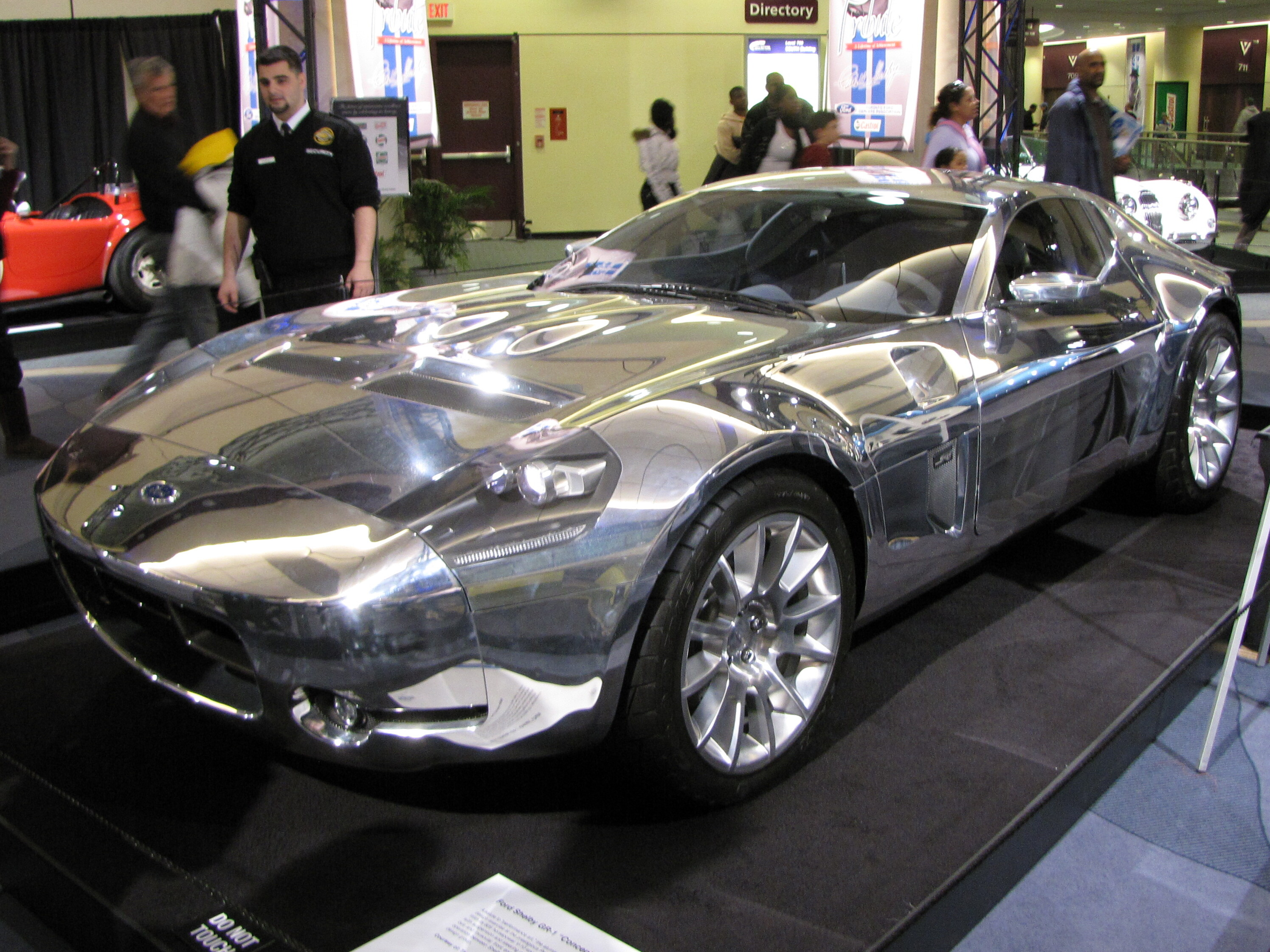
Ford Shelby GR-1 Concept Coupe

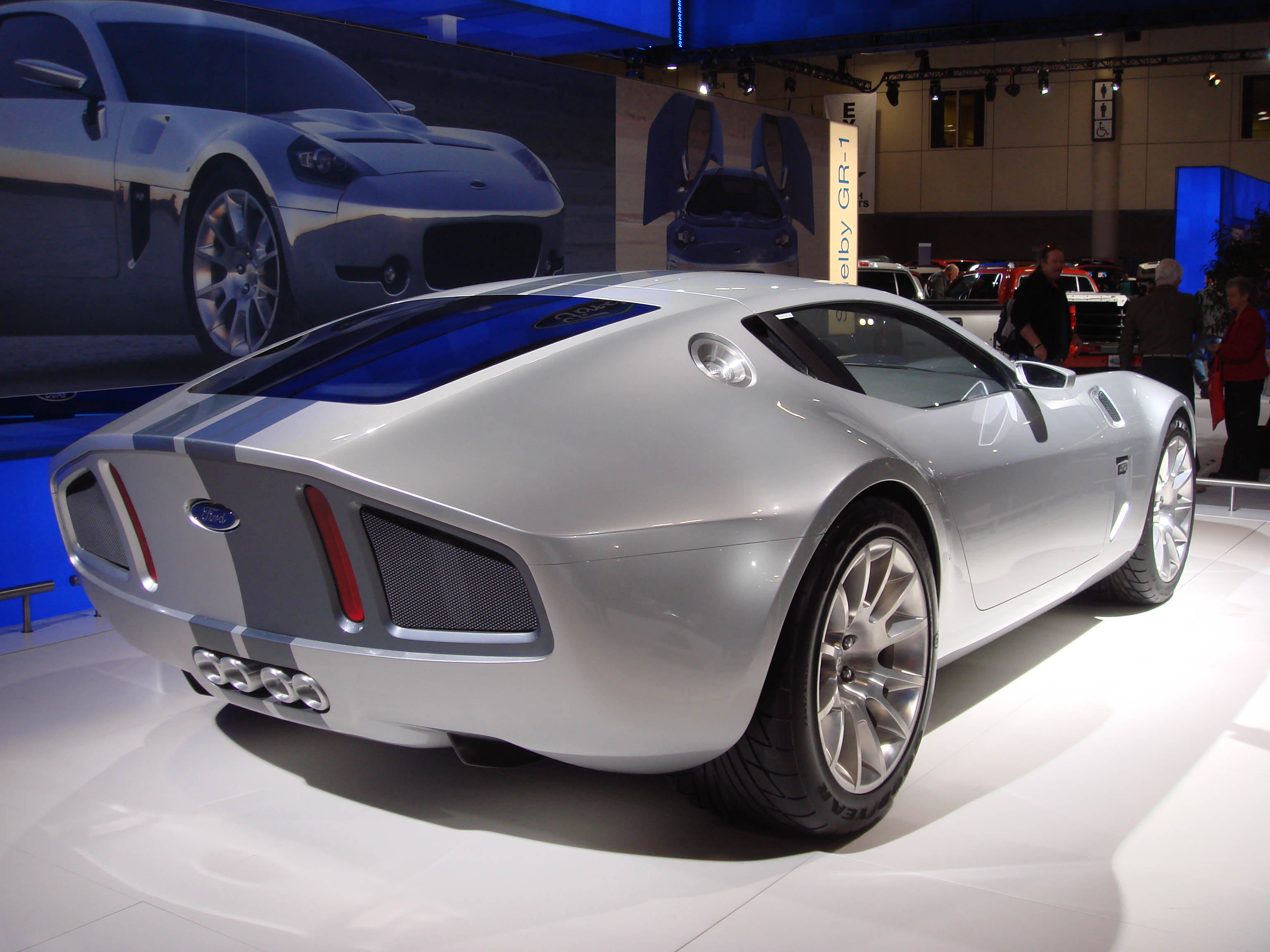
Ford Shelby GR-1 at the 2007 Canadian International AutoShow
