= Pete Brock =

American racecar constructor

- Born: Peter Elbert Brock; November 15, 1936 (age 90); New York, United States
- Occupations: Automotive and trailer designer, author, photojournalist

Peter Elbert Brock is an American automotive and trailer designer, author and photojournalist, who is best known for his work on the Shelby Daytona Cobra Coupe, Corvette Sting Ray, and his firm, Brock Racing Enterprises (BRE).

== Early life and education ==
Peter Elbert Brock (named Elbert after his grandfather E. J. Hall, co-designer of the Liberty L-12 engine and co-founder of Hall-Scott Motor Car Company) grew up primarily in the Sausalito area of northern California. When he was 16 years old, he saved up to buy a 1949 MG from the back of the shop where he worked. In addition to the work Brock did on the car, he painted it white so the car's livery would match the U.S. international racing colors of blue and white.

Brock was first exposed to professional racing when he went to his first road race at Pebble Beach, California in 1951, photographing cars and drivers, including Phil Hill in the 1952 race, but was still too young for a racing driver's license since the SCCA minimum age requirement was 21 at that time.

Soon after, his family moved to Menlo Park. He started looking for something faster than his MG and found a half-completed 1946 Ford convertible on a used car lot. He started in on the customization of the Ford, which included converting the livery into the white and blue American racing scheme (white car with two blue stripes down the center). While still in high school, he won the Oakland Roadster show with the car, by then referred to as "the Fordillac" because of the Cadillac engine Brock had installed. Brock won the show again with the car in 1956, months before he left California for General Motors in Detroit.

Upon graduating from high school, he enrolled at Stanford University in the engineering department. He subsequently dropped out, having driven to Los Angeles to enroll at what was then called the Art Center School, later known as the Art Center College of Design in Pasadena, California. When asked by the admissions officer for his portfolio, he had brought no drawings with him, so instead returned to his car, made some drawings of hot rod cars in his 3 ring binder, returned to the admissions office and presented his "portfolio", and was admitted.

== Career ==
=== General Motors ===
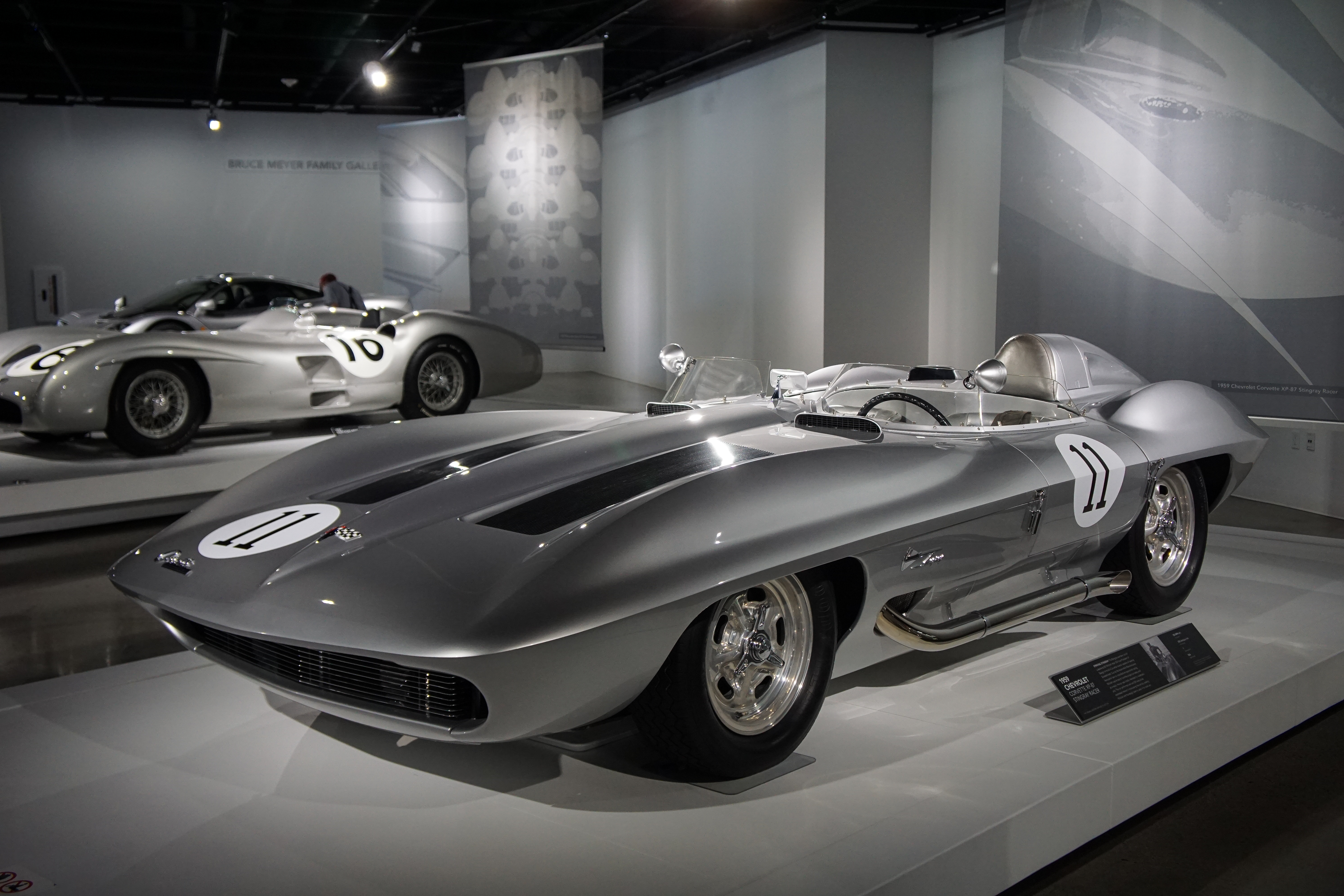
The Corvette XP-87 Sting Ray Racer (1959).

At the age of 19, while still attending Art Center School, Brock became one of the youngest designers ever hired by General Motors' GM Styling design department. In November 1957, Brock drew the sketch which GM VP of Design Bill Mitchell picked to become the design of the 2nd generation (C2) Corvette, the Corvette Stingray. As GM had made a commitment to not engage in racing (known as the AMA ban) Brock worked with Mitchell in 1957 in a secret design studio, creating the prototype of the Sting Ray racer. The production car was renamed the Stingray and was released in 1963 with a rear split window, almost 4 years after Brock had left GM.

=== Shelby American ===
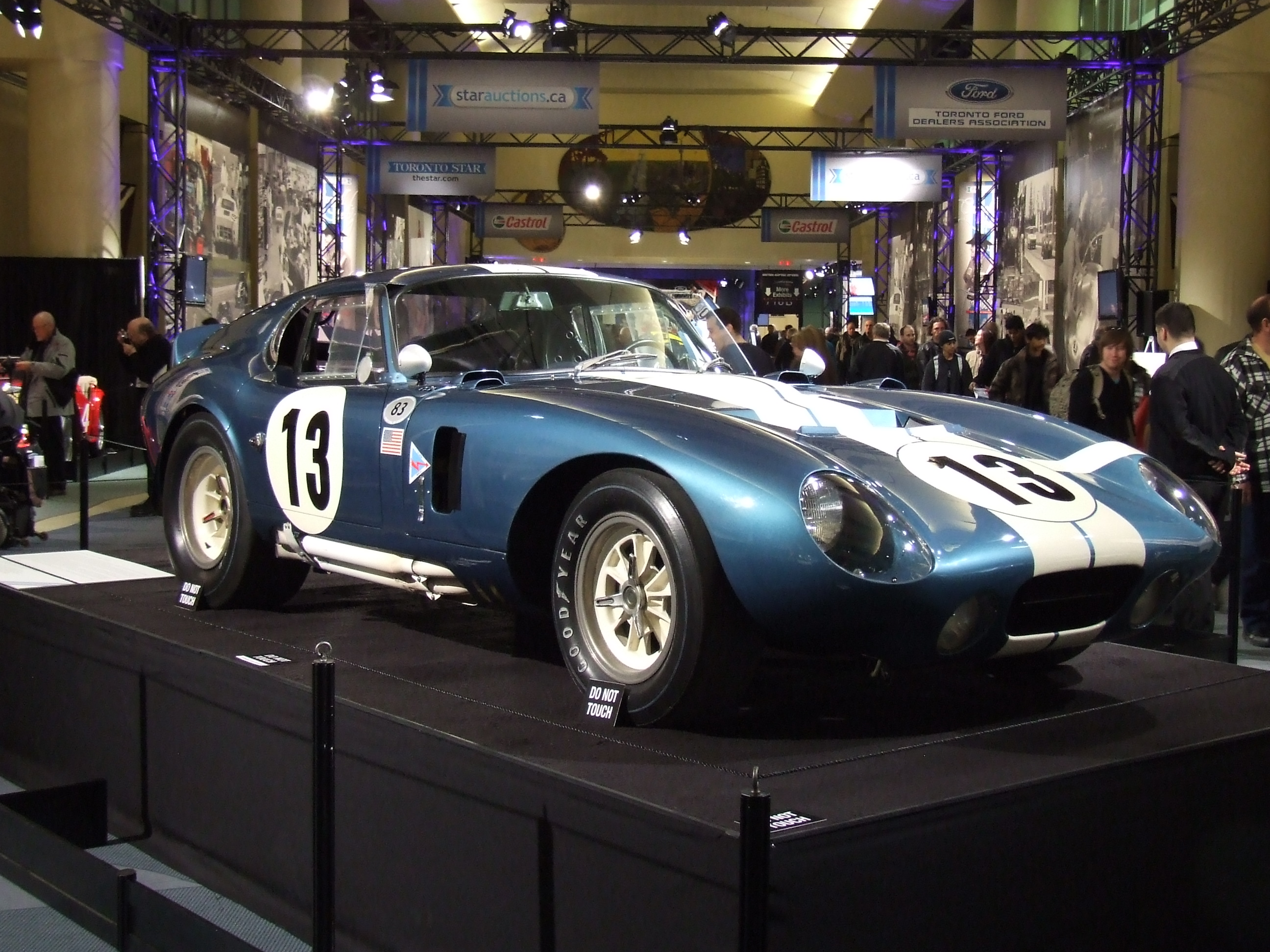
CSX2299, the second of six Brock-designed Shelby Daytona Cobra Coupes.

In 1959, having now turned 21, which allowed Brock to obtain his SCCA race license, Brock left GM to return to California and become a race car driver. In Detroit he'd been working on a mid-1950s Cooper that had run at Le Mans. Returning to California with the Cooper, he started working for Max Balchowsky at Max's Hollywood Motors shop during the day and worked on his race car at night. In 1961 Carroll Shelby and Paul O'Shea met at Riverside Raceway to discuss opening a driver's school. When Shelby and O'Shea got into a disagreement about who would work for who, O'Shea left. Shelby hired Brock as his first paid employee, running the Carroll Shelby School of High Performance Driving. Brock worked at Shelby American until the end of the 1965 season on the Shelby American brand, creating the logos, merchandise, ads, and car liveries. He designed the Shelby components of the Shelby Mustang GT350s and designed race cars for Shelby such as the Lang Cooper, Nethercutt Mirage, De Tomaso P70 and the Shelby Daytona Cobra coupes that won the FIA GT World Championship in 1965.

=== Brock Racing Enterprises ===
In December 1965, Brock started his own design firm and motor racing team, Brock Racing Enterprises (BRE) which worked with Hino, Toyota, and Datsun. GT cars Brock designed for BRE clients included the Hino Samurai, the Toyota JP6 and the Triumph TR-250K. Brock continued racing, now driving his own Lotus 11 MKII and paid rides with a TVR and Mercury in the NASCAR series.

Brock began performance development on the Hino 900, which then evolved into their Hino 1300 Contessa. When Toyota took over Hino, Brock designed for them the JP6 Prototype. In 1968, Toyota contracted with Brock to give BRE two Toyota 2000GTs for use in SCCA racing, but when Toyota instead gave the cars to Carroll Shelby, Brock approached Datsun.BRE became the west coast Datsun factory race team and competed in 1969 in the SCCA DP class with Datsun 2000 roadsters, in 1970 and 1971 in the CP class with the 240Zs (SCCA National Champions '70-'71) and in 1971-72 in the 2.5 Trans-Am Series races with the Datsun 510s (National Champions '71-'72). The race team was disbanded at the end of the 1972 season when Brock moved on to hang gliding.

=== Ultralite Products ===
By the end of the 1972 race season, Brock had sketched what became the ’63 Corvette Sting Ray, designed the FIA GT World Championship Daytona Cobra Coupe, had founded BRE and won four National SCCA Championships for Nissan with the BRE Datsun 240Zs and 510s. More than a lifetime of accomplishments for most, Brock wasn’t done by any stretch of the imagination. In 1972, he drove by a construction site and saw people flying off of tall sand berms, hanging from kites made precariously from visqueen plastic duct-taped to bamboo sticks. He stopped and a winded flyer offered him his kite to try it out.

Brock went back to his BRE shop and made a set of high-quality parts to build kites with. He went back to the sand berms and showed them to the flyers. They were impressed and asked the cost. When Brock said $5 the response was “$5! What a rip-off!”

At the end of the race season, Brock closed down BRE and founded Ultralight Products Inc (UP) to build hang gliders as he thought they should be. As he'd done with BRE, Brock assembled a talented group of employees who developed state-of-the art hang gliders and led the industry in safety improvements. Brock built UP into the largest hang gliding company in the world and developed the sport of long distance hang gliding competition. The UP competition flight team won 7 out of 8 Worldwide Championships. In the late '80s, Brock left the company, citing dissatisfaction with liability laws, and returned to the automotive industry.

Brock was inducted into the Rogallo Hall of Fame in 2024.

=== Instructor, author and photographer ===
Brock became an instructor at his alma mater, Art Center College of Design in Pasadena, California after leaving the world of hang gliding. He taught automotive history and aerodynamics. In the early 1990s he wrote the definitive book on the history of the World Champion Daytona Cobra Coupes, cars he originally designed in 1963. The book was so well respected in the industry he was contacted by several automotive media outlets requesting he cover the automotive race industry for them.

In 1999, Brock finally relented, leaving his teaching position at Art Center and becoming a world respected automotive photojournalist. For more than 20 years Brock, joined by his wife Gayle, a world class photographer in her own right, covered endurance racing for automotive magazines such as Racer, Car & Driver, MotorTrend, Autoweek, Auto Aficionado, Classic Motorsports, Grassroots Motorsports, Excellence, Bimmer, Roundel, Sports Car Illustrated and Corvette magazine.

In 2013, the 50th anniversary of the '63 split window Corvette, Brock wrote the book: Corvette Sting Ray: Genesis of an American Icon on the development of the 1963 Corvette sharing his insider view of how this iconic car came about. The book won the prestigious Motor Press Guild's Best Book of the Year Award and even more coveted Dean Batchelor Award.

In 2018, Brock shared the details of the cars he designed while at Shelby American in the book: The Road to Modena: Origins and History of the Shelby-DeTomaso P70 Can-Am Sports Racer. Brock shared the different design techniques used in the U.S., which he employed while building the Champion Daytona Cobra Coupe, as compared to the Italian way of designing and building cars which he learned while working in Italy building the Shelby DeTomaso P70, a joint effort by Carroll Shelby and Alejandro de Tomaso in 1964. Brock shares his love and admiration of the Italian craftsman he worked with stating; "Working with the Italians I now understood why Italian cars are of such beautiful and fluid design." Brock's book received the Gold Award for Best Automotive Heritage Award by the Automotive Heritage Association.

Always designing, in 1999, Brock worked with Hi-Tech, a company making automobiles in Port Elizabeth, South Africa to create a modern version of the Daytona Cobra Coupe, called the Brock Coupe. Over 150 Brock Coupes were produced in South Africa and sold by Superformance, LLC. To this day, Brock owns and drives his personal Superformance Brock Coupe (chassis #0073), painted Amulet Red with a Wimbledon White half-cove.

=== Present ===
Brock now lives in Henderson, Nevada in the Las Vegas Valley area with his wife Gayle.

Brock continues to be active in the automotive industry, giving presentations on automotive history, writing articles and editorials, judging car shows, and designing new automobiles using his original techniques of designing with clay models. In 2008, Brock designed a lightweight and aerodynamic car trailer called the Aerovault, made of aluminum and composite materials, employing his successful aerodynamic effects with race cars, including a fully skinned underside.

Seeing the need for such a trailer in the industry beyond their own use, Brock's wife Gayle founded Aerovault LLC, managing the company on a day-to-day basis including manufacturing, marketing and sales. Gayle also runs Brock's original BRE operation which now focuses on offering memorabilia from the 1960s and 1970s, and aftermarket parts and accessories for Datsun 510s and 240Z and Daytona Cobra Coupe replicas.

== Awards and recognition ==
In 2010, the International Society for Vehicle Preservation presented Brock with their International Automotive Media Lifetime Achievement Award.

Later that same year, the Art Center College of Design awarded Brock their Lifetime Achievement Award for "Outstanding accomplishment in the fields of automotive design, technology, innovation, motorsports and journalism".

In 2012, BRE received a Commendation from the City of Henderson for "their contributions to the automobile industry and in appreciation of their community support."

In 2013, Brock was awarded the Phil Hill Award by the Road Racing Drivers Club (RRDC). The RRDC presents the Phil Hill Award for outstanding service to road racing. Brock was presented the award at the Daytona Speedway by Bobby Rahal.

In 2016, Brock was awarded the Spirit of Competition Award by the Simeone Foundation Automotive Museum.

In 2017, Brock was inducted into the Sports Car Club of America Hall of Fame.

In 2022, Brock was inducted into the Motorsports Hall of Fame.

In 2022, Brock was voted by a worldwide group of his peers (designers) to receive the Eyes On Design Lifetime Achievement Award for design.

Later in 2022, Brock was bestowed the American Speed Festival's Master of Motorsports Award

In 2024, Brock was inducted into the Rogallo Hall of Fame for his groundbreaking work in the field of hang gliding.

Articles on Brock's career have appeared in Classic Motorsports, Automobile, Road & Track, MotorTrend Classic, Grassroots Motorsports and Car & Driver magazines.
