= Shelby Daytona =

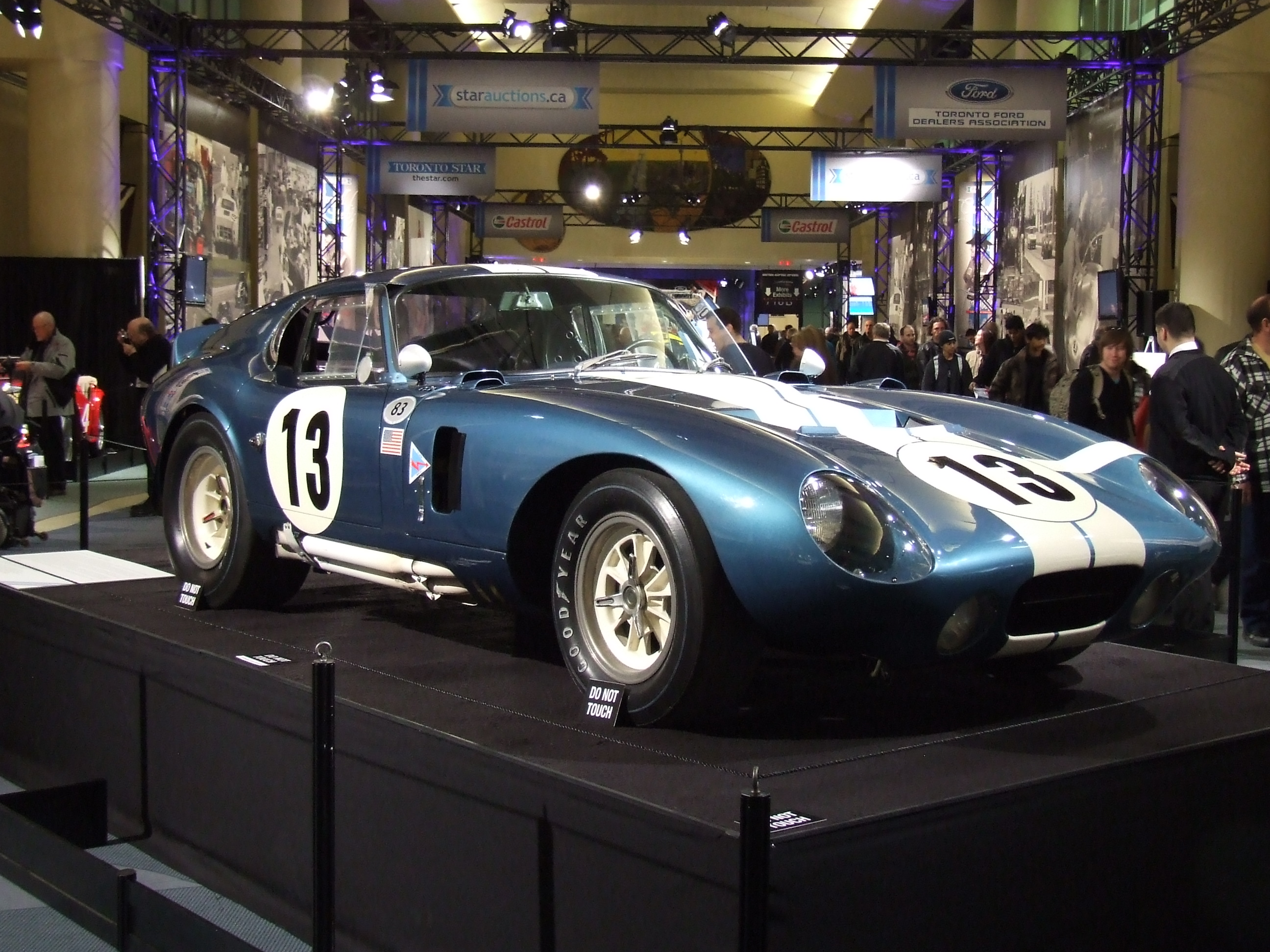

Overview
- Manufacturer: Shelby American
- Model years: 1964–1965
- Assembly: Venice, California, USA; Modena, Italy
- Designer: Pete Brock

Body and chassis
- Body style: 2-door coupe
- Layout: FMR layout

Powertrain
- Engine: Ford 289 cu in (4.7 L) V8

Dimensions
- Wheelbase: 2,286 mm (90 in)
- Length: 4,150 mm (163.4 in)
- Width: 1,720 mm (67.7 in)
- Height: 1,180 mm (46.5 in)
- Curb weight: 1,043 kg (2,299 lb)

The Shelby Daytona Coupe (also referred to as the Shelby Cobra Daytona Coupe) is an American sports-coupé. It is related to the Shelby Cobra roadster, loosely based on its chassis and drive-train developed and built as an advanced evolution. It was engineered and purpose built for auto racing, specifically to take on Ferrari and its 250 GTO in the GT class. The original project had six Shelby Daytona Coupes built for racing purposes between 1964 and 1965, as Carroll Shelby was reassigned to the Ford GT40 project to compete at the 24 Hours of Le Mans, again to beat Ferrari in the highest level prototype class.

Shelby won a title in the International Championship for GT Manufacturers in the 1965 season with the Shelby Daytona car, thus becoming the first American constructor to win a title on the international scene at the FIA World Championships. In 2014, the first Cobra Daytona Coupe became the first vehicle recorded under a U.S. federal program for documenting historically important national treasures.

== Racing success ==
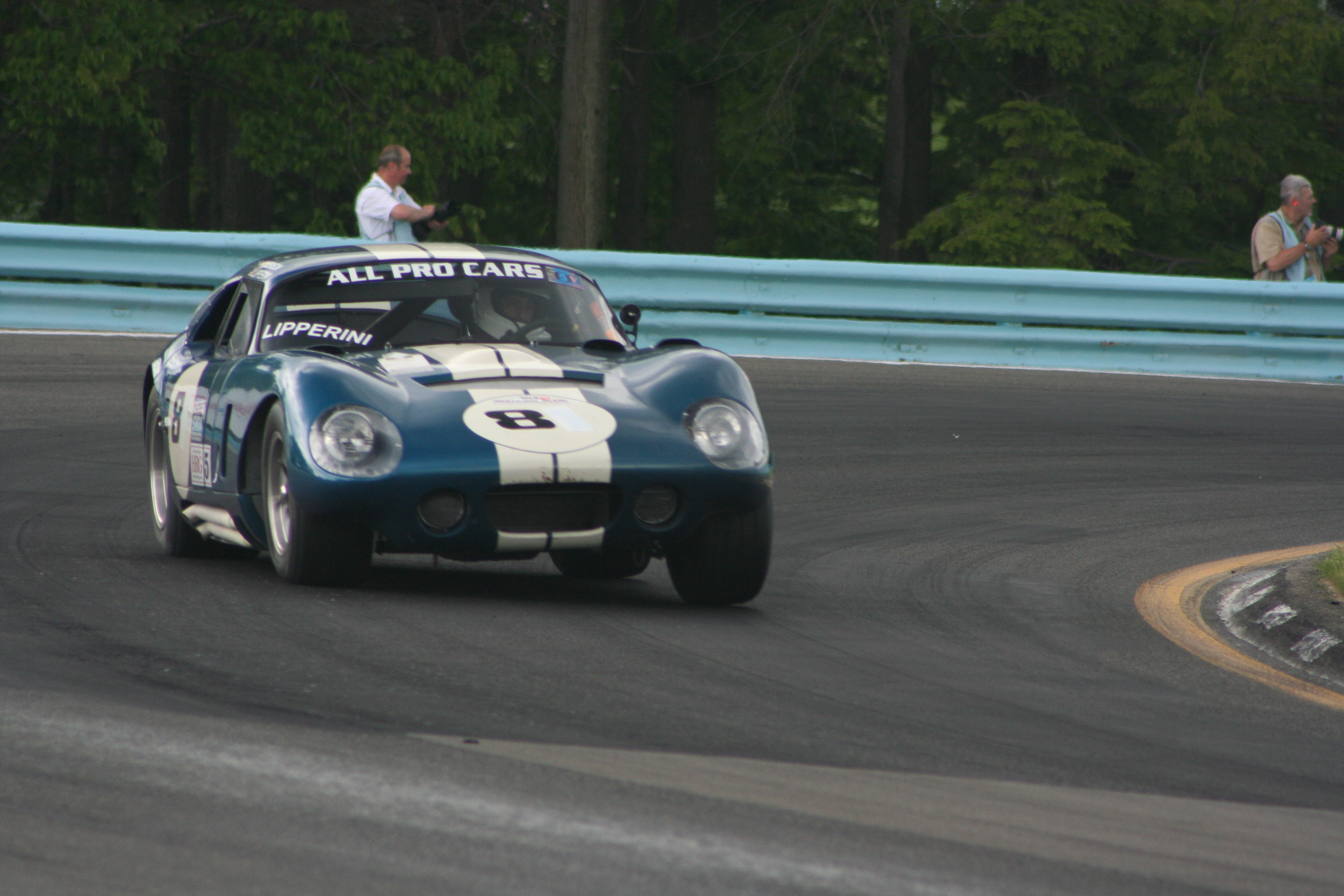
HSR Historics 2009

During 1964 and 1965, Ford entered their six Shelby Daytona Coupes in numerous races through the British Alan Mann Racing Ford factory team, as well as temporarily selling or leasing to other racing teams such as "Tri-Colore" of France and Scuderia Filipinetti of Switzerland.

During this period, Shelby Daytona Coupes raced in GT Division III, for engine displacements over 2000 cc. They competed at numerous 500 km, 1000 km, 2000 km, 12 hour and 24 hour races on the International Championship for GT Manufacturers series, including events at Le Mans, Daytona, Sebring, Imola, Reims, Spa Francorchamps, Goodwood Circuit, Oulton Park, Circuito Piccolo delle Madonie, the multi-race Tour de France Automobile, Enna, Rouen, Monza, and Nürburgring.

The Shelby Daytona Coupes, in their first year of competition, finished second (to Ferrari, by 6 points) in GT III class in the 1964 International Championship for GT Manufacturers. The Shelby Daytona Coupes won the GT III class (by 19 points) for the 1965 International Championship for GT Manufacturers.

A partial list of competitions and results includes:

- 1964 12 Hours of Sebring (GT class win, fourth overall, Dave MacDonald/Bob Holbert)
- 1964 24 Hours of Le Mans (GT class win, fourth overall, Dan Gurney/Bob Bondurant)
- 1964 RAC Tourist Trophy (GT class win)
- 1965 24 Hours of Daytona (GT class win)
- 1965 12 Hours of Sebring (GT class win)
- 1965 Italian Grand Prix at Monza (GT class win)
- 1965 Nürburgring 1000 km (GT class win)
- 1965 12 Hours of Reims (GT class win, clinched 1965 International Championship for GT Manufacturers)
- 1965 Enna-Pergusa (GT class win)
- 1965 25 land speed records at Bonneville

== The Ferrari/Mulsanne problem ==
Carroll Shelby, after winning Le Mans in 1959, wanted to return to Europe to beat Enzo Ferrari at Le Mans with a car of his own design. Having developed the AC Cobra/Shelby Cobra into a successful GT race car, he realised that the weakness of the open-cockpit sports cars at Le Mans was the aerodynamic drag which limited top speed on the 3.7 miles (6.0 km) long Mulsanne Straight to around 157 miles per hour (253 km/h), nearly 30 miles per hour (48 km/h) less than the Ferrari 250 GTO, which itself could hold speeds of circa 186 miles per hour (299 km/h). Given the length of this straight, this speed differential represented a loss of over 10 seconds per lap which could negate any power and acceleration advantage that the Cobra had in the slower sections.

Shelby asked employee Pete Brock to design the Daytona's aerodynamic bodywork and Bob Negstad to design the car's suspension. Negstad also designed the chassis and suspension for the GT40 and the CSX 3000 series Shelby Cobra, often referred to as the "coil-Spring Cobra" chassis.

After sketching the proposed design on the floor of the Shelby America workshop, starting with the roadster chassis crashed at the 1963 Le Mans race, Brock removed the bodywork and placed a seat and steering wheel in alignment of where he felt that they should be. He then placed driver Ken Miles in the car, and using scrap wood and gaffer tape, designed the windscreen - the first component to be manufactured for the car. He then interspaced wooden formers and, using these as a guide, hand-made the aluminum bodywork for chassis #CSX2287 around them.

Shelby conferred with an aerodynamics consultant from Convair, Ben Howard, who said that the design needed to be extended on the tail by at least 3 feet (0.91 m), but Brock stood by his design. Shelby later said that, in hindsight, the extension would have been "too much work" and would have made the car too long, but that Howard had been right all along. Miles took the car to the Riverside Raceway, and on the 1 mile (1.6 km) main straight, took the car on his first five laps to 186 miles per hour (299 km/h), admittedly after it had been found to have "almost flown, lightening the steering a great deal" at speeds above 160 miles per hour (260 km/h). It took another 30 days of development before Miles signed off the car, clocked at that point capable of speeds over 190 miles per hour (310 km/h). CSX2287 was transported to Daytona Speedway for its debut race in the February 16, 1964 Daytona Continental 2000 km. Driver Dave MacDonald earned the pole position with a time of 2:08.200 and average speed of 106.464 miles per hour (171.337 km/h).

== Chassis numbers ==
The first Shelby Daytona Coupe was built at the Shelby American race shop in Venice, California. The remaining five were built at Carrozzeria Gransport (Italian for "Grand Sport Coachbuilders") in Modena, Italy.

A seventh semi-related car, the 427 "Type 65" Shelby Daytona Super Coupe # CSB3054 prototype that was developed but never officially completed by Shelby, is not included in this article.

=== Chassis # CSX2286 ===
Build #CSX2286, was built as a one-off special for the 1964 24 Hours of Le Mans race however it never made it to the race. Carroll Shelby told a fictitious version of the story, claiming that it had an accident when being put on the truck to go to Le Mans. The truth was that the car was never finished.

The original plan with CSX2286 was to lengthen the chassis and modify the car so that the 289 cu in Ford engine could be replaced with a NASCAR inspired big block. New Zealander John Ohlsen, who worked for Shelby on the original Daytona Coupe prototype (chassis #CSX2287) with Pete Brock and Ken Miles, modified the chassis used for the build at Shelby’s Venice shop. The car was then shipped to Italy, where Ohlsen was meant to oversee the installation of a Ford aluminium 427 cu in block. Citing concerns about overheating Ford reneged on the 427 and instead provided a 390, which Ohlsen installed. Time ran out on the build after the remaining long list of parts from Ford never arrived. Instead, another build, chassis #CSX2299, was used at the race with Ohlsen as crew chief and the car driven by Bob Bondurant and Dan Gurney. This car finished fourth in the main race but won in the GT class. CSX2286 was returned to California, returned to stock, and was raced at Le Mans the following year with drivers Gurney and Jerry Grant. Due to clutch trouble it failed to finish.

Owned and successfully vintage raced by S. Robson Walton, but crashed at Laguna Seca Raceway in August 2012. The car has since been repaired and fully restored.

=== Chassis # CSX2287 - The Original ===
Chassis #CSX2287 was the very first prototype Cobra Daytona Coupe, and is the only coupe that was built entirely at the Shelby American race shop in Venice, California. It was designed by Pete Brock, based on German engineering designs for an aerodynamic race car, dating back to the late 1930s. The plans were thought by Brock to have been lost during World War II however copies of the original German plans were found in the archive stores at Ford. Brock used these as the basis for the new design. Brock, driver Ken Miles, and fabricator John Ohlsen were the original members of the project. The design was initially snubbed by the rest of the Shelby team but after the car started to take shape and driving tests showed impressive results, the rest of the team got on board with the project to help finish it. In the May 2020 issue of Classic Motorsports Brock recounted "...In spite of all the internal dissension, Ohlsen, Miles and I persevered. We led a small group of shop converts into building our first Daytona Coupe in 90 days!"

CSX2287 has an extensive race history, competing at Daytona, Sebring, Reims, Spa Francorchamps, Oulton Park TT, Le Mans, Tour de France and Bonneville Salt Flats. It was driven by Dave MacDonald, Bob Holbert, Jo Schlesser, Phil Hill, Jochen Neerpasch, Chris Amon, Innes Ireland, André Simon, Maurice Dupeyron, Bob Johnson and Tom Payne.

Chassis CSX2287 won the GT class at the 12 Hours of Sebring in March 1964 with MacDonald and Holbert behind the wheel. The race at Sebring marked the first victory for a Cobra Daytona Coupe. At Le Mans in June 1964, the car was finished in Viking Blue metallic very distinctive white painted front fenders. The drivers were Amon and Neerpasch. They led the GT class until the car was disqualified in the 10th hour for an illegal jump start due to battery and alternator failure.

This coupe ended its racing career by setting 25 USAC/FIA world records at the Bonneville Salt Flats, Utah, in November 1965, while driven by Craig Breedlove, Bobby Tatroe and Tom Greatorex during a Goodyear tire testing session. Shortly thereafter, it was reconditioned and was advertised for sale.

Slot car racing magnate Jim Russell bought the car from Shelby in 1966 after seeing an ad in the newspaper, for about $4-$5k. Russell eventually listed the car for sale and music producer Phil Spector bought it from him. The car was not suited for street driving, however certain features were added including traditional rear-exit mufflers and interior carpeting, in order to make it more user-friendly. It is unknown if these were added by Spector or Russell.

Built for high-speed racing, the cab became uncomfortably warm at low speeds, among other problems. Still, Spector drove it on the streets, and legend is that Spector racked up so many speeding tickets, his lawyer advised him to get rid of the car before he lost his license.

The car made an appearance in a 1968 episode of The Monkees, where it was driven against the Monkeemobile in a race. The car was given an iron cross on the 'meatball'.

All trace of CSX2287 was lost by the mid-1970s, with car historians and collectors fearing the car had been destroyed. In 2001 the car was rediscovered in a rental storage unit in California. The owner Donna O'Hara had committed suicide by burning herself alive. The car had remained undiscovered for almost 30 years. Due to its estimated worth of over $4,000,000 the car was part of an extensive legal battle between her mother who sold the car to Dr. Frederick A. Simeone, and a friend of Ms O'Hara who was the recipient in her will of the contents of the storage unit.

CSX2287 is restored. It has been preserved and mechanically reconditioned. It is part of the permanent collection at the Simeone Foundation Automotive Museum in Philadelphia, PA, USA.

In January 2014 CSX2287 became the first vehicle added to the Historic Vehicle Association's National Historic Vehicle Register in the United States. Concurrently it became the first automobile to be recorded under the United States Secretary of the Interior Standards for Heritage Documentation, kept on file in the Library of Congress. In November 2014, CSX2287 won the International Historic Motoring Awards "Car of the Year", which is voted on by the public. In addition to being the first American car to win the award, the Cobra Daytona Coupe is also the first American car nominated for this award.

=== Chassis # CSX2299 ===
This was the second Coupe built and the first completed at Carrozzeria Gransport. It competed in nine FIA races (LeMans, Reims, Goodwood Tourist Trophy, Tour de France, Daytona, Sebring, Oulton Park TT, LeMans, Enna), won four FIA events (LeMans '64, Tourist Trophy '64, Daytona '65, Sebring '65) and one event during the Tour de France (Rouen). The car was driven through this period by Dan Gurney, Bob Bondurant, Maurice Trintignant, Bernard de St. Auban, Jo Schlesser, Hal Keck, Jack Sears and Dick Thompson. At LeMans in 1964, drivers Gurney and Bondurant, clocking over 196 miles per hour (315 km/h) on the Mulsanne Straight, took First Place in the GT III Class.

CSX2299 was painted Viking Blue with two white stripes in 1964 and repainted Guardsman Blue with two larger longitudinal white stripes and a transverse white stripe across the nose in 1965. In 1964 this car set lap records at Le Mans, Reims and Rouen and the race distance record at Le Mans and Goodwood. In 1965 the car set the lap record at Oulton Park.

CSX2299 was the last Daytona coupe sold by Shelby with a Bill of Sale which read "the number one Cobra Daytona coupe". It is currently owned by Larry H. Miller Group and is displayed at the Shelby American Collection in Boulder, Colorado.

=== Chassis # CSX2300 ===
This Shelby Daytona Coupe was leased from Alan Mann Racing by Ford of France, to race as the national "Tri-Colore" entry in the 1965 Nurburgring 1000 km race, for which it was painted a white body finish with blue and red stripes. Well known French drivers André Simon and Jo Schlesser drove this coupe to 3rd in the GT 3 category (behind the GT winning Alan Mann entry driven by Bondurant and Neerpasch), and 12th overall. After the race, this white coupe was returned to Alan Mann Racing and was repainted in the official Guardsman Blue metallic and white stripe of the 1965 Shelby American team. Carroll Shelby himself owned this Daytona before it was sold by RM Auctions for $4.4 million on August 19, 2000.

=== Chassis # CSX2601 ===
This was the fourth Coupe built and the third completed at Carrozzeria Gransport. It competed in eight FIA races in 1965 (Daytona, Sebring, Monza, Spa, Nürburgring, LeMans, Reims, Enna), won four times in GT III class (Monza, Nürburgring, Reims, Enna), and driven by Bob Johnson, Tom Payne, Bob Bondurant, Allen Grant, Jochen Neerpasch and Jo Schlesser.

At Reims, 3–4 July 1965, drivers were Bondurant and Schlesser. It was painted Guardsman Blue. They won the GT III Class, while also earning the points needed to secure the 1965 International Championship for GT Manufacturers.

This car was featured in the 1965 film Red Line 7000, then was purchased by its driver Bob Bondurant, who sold it in 1969. The car sold for $7.25 million on August 15, 2009, and it is currently owned by Perez Companc family from Argentina.

=== Chassis # CSX2602 ===
This was the fifth Shelby Coupe built and the fourth completed at Carrozzeria Gransport. It competed in six 1965 races (Daytona, Sebring, Monza, Spa, Nürburgring and LeMans) and was driven by Rick Muther, John Timanus, Lew Spencer, Jim Adams, Phil Hill, Jack Sears, John Whitmore, Peter Sutcliffe and Peter Harper. Prior to the Le Mans race, chassis CSX 2602 was also raced at Daytona (driven by Muther and Timanus) in 1965, Sebring (driven by Spencer, Adams, and Hill) in 1965, Monza (driven by Sears and Whitmore) in 1965, and Nurburgring (driven by Sears and Gardner) also in 1965.

Racing with the #59 at Le Mans on June 19–20, 1965, British drivers Sutcliffe and Harper ran CSX2602 with the distinctive Red & White Swiss colors for the famous Swiss racing team "Scuderia Filipinetti". The latter had already earned a reputation for themselves racing Ferraris. When Ford used up their allotment of entries for the 1965 Le Mans race, they asked team owner Georges Filipinetti to buy a Shelby Coupe from Alan Mann Racing and race it as his own annual entry. The red and white Cobra ran until the 10th hour, when a blown engine put it out of the race. After Le Mans, chassis CSX2602 was returned to Alan Mann Racing. It was repainted in the Shelby American team colors and never raced again.

== Continuation model ==
In July 2015 Shelby American announced that they would produce a limited run of 50 continuation Daytonas to honor the 50th anniversary of the Daytona's win in the International Championship for GT Manufacturers. Some of the 50 are to be aluminum-bodied, while others will have cheaper fiberglass bodies.

== Ford Shelby GR-1 ==
In 2004 Ford and Shelby created a sports coupe dubbed the Ford Shelby GR-1, with a sleek body and the new V10 powering the new Shelby Cobra. Carroll Shelby has explained that he did not want it to be called a Cobra, but it does bear resemblance to the Daytona.

== List of replicas and reproductions ==
- Daytona-Coupe, Aps (Denmark) and AMMAS (Germany) for 1964, 1965 replicas
- Superformance Shelby Cobra Daytona Coupe - "SPF Coupe"; Shelby Licensed Replica
- All Pro Cars
- Borland Racing Development's Daytona Sportscar reproduction
- Factory Five Racing - Type 65 Coupe, reproduction
- Shell Valley Companies - 1964 Daytona Coupe Series II, reproduction
- Lesher Motor Sports
- Kirkham Motor Sports 289 Coupe

== Comparable vehicles ==
- Bill Thomas Cheetah, 1963, powered with Chevrolet V8 engines
- AC Cobra A98 Coupé, powered with the Ford 289 engine, and raced at Le Mans in 1964
