= Roush Performance =

American high-performance auto parts company

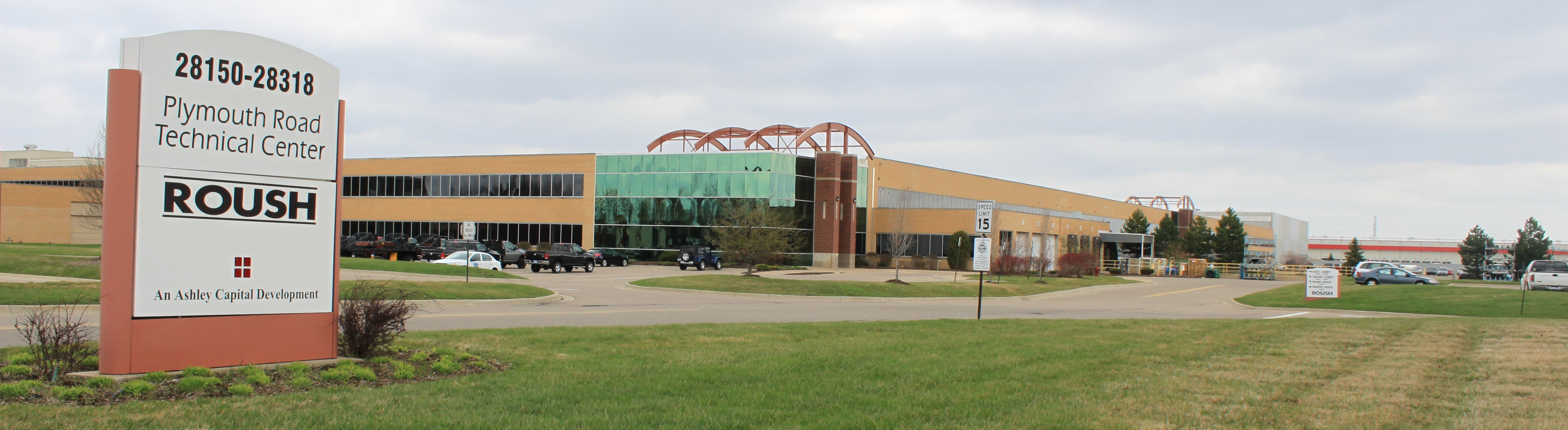
- Roush vehicle facility in Livonia, Michigan
- Type: Private Company
- Industry: Automotive
- Founded: 1995
- Founder: Jack Roush
- Headquarters: Livonia, Michigan, United States
- Key people: Jack Roush, Owner
- Website: roushperformance.com roush.com

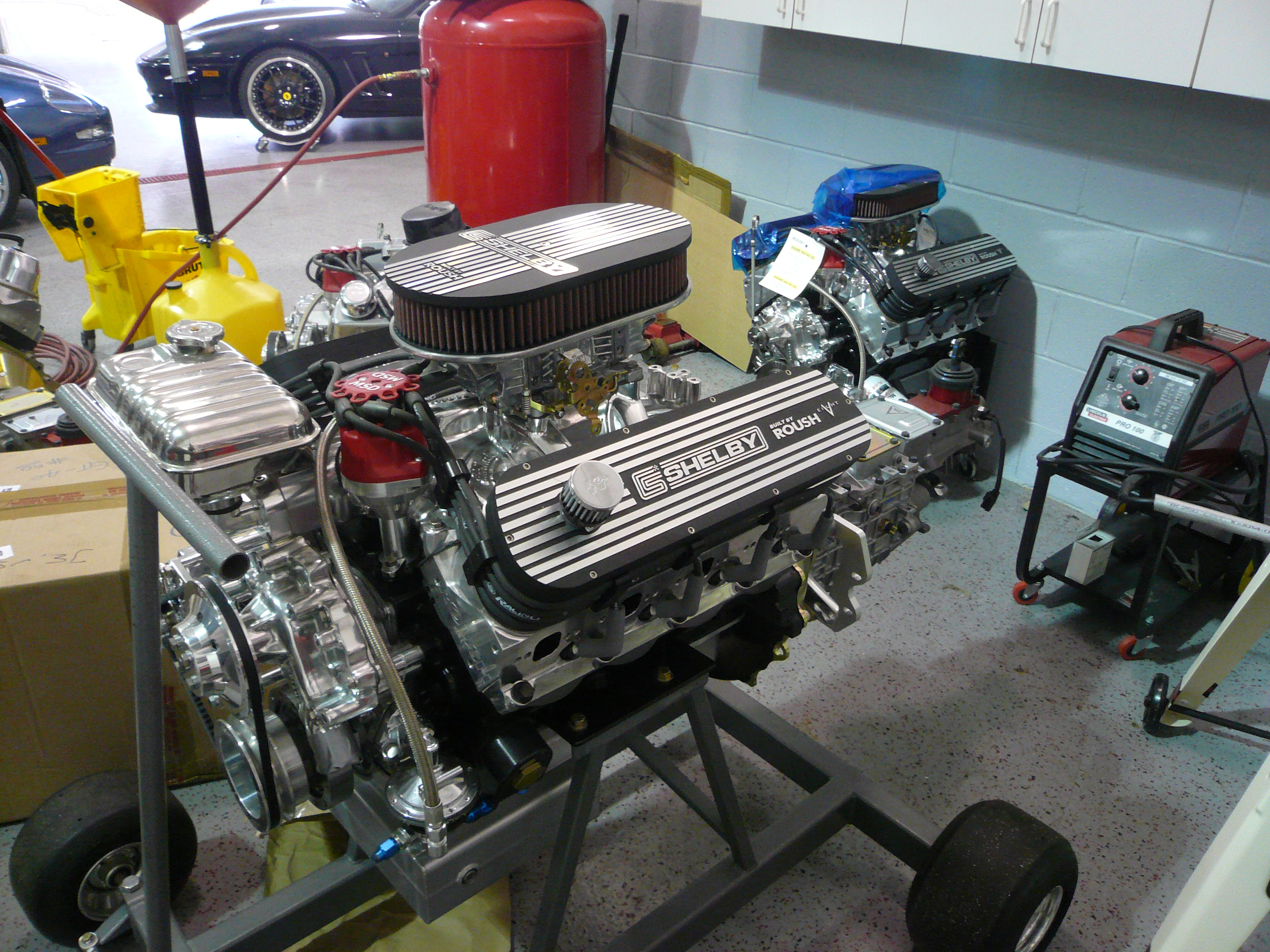
A Roush 402 cubic inch engine built for the Shelby Daytona Coupe

Roush Performance is an American automotive company primarily involved in the engineering, development, and manufacturing of high-performance components for street and competitive racing applications. The company's namesake is automotive mogul Jack Roush, who owns and operates the firm. Founded in 1995 by Roush, it provides automotive engineering from racing to street cars.

== Aftermarket parts ==
Roush produces aftermarket performance parts for Ford cars and trucks, mainly the Ford Mustang, Ford Focus, and the Ford F-150 light duty pickup. These special model vehicles are sold to the public through select Ford dealerships. In addition to the high performance business, Roush supplies a propane conversion kit for the F-150, as well as for school buses.

Roush is listed as a vehicle "Manufacturer of Record," in that the company modifies Ford F-150, Ford Focus, and Ford Mustangs to the extent that they are considered "Roush" vehicles, and some carry Roush factory warranties (as opposed to Ford warranties).

== Roush factory-modified vehicles ==
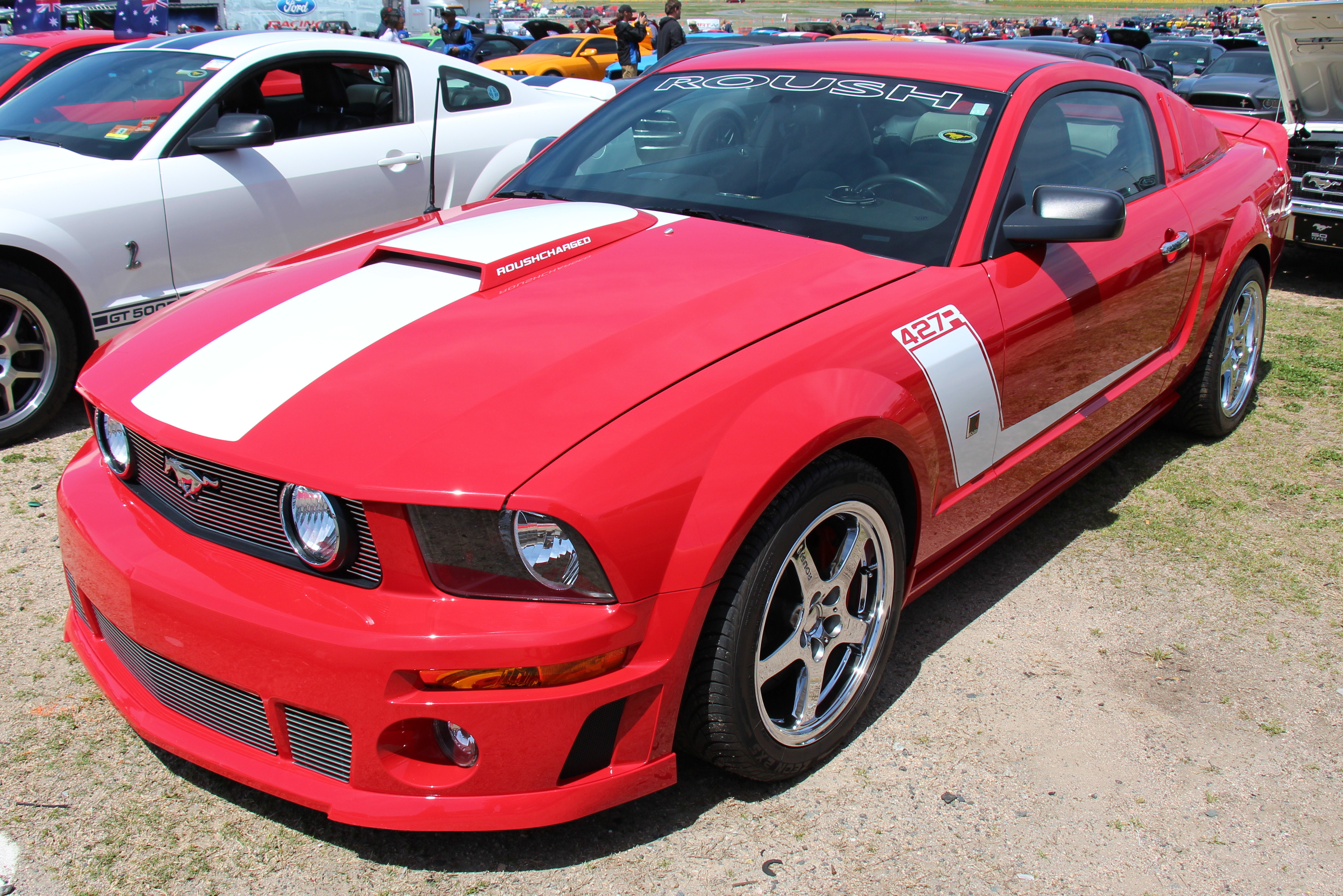
Ford Mustang Roush 427R

Modifications to Ford vehicles completed at their Livonia, Michigan factory include upgrades such as suspension, body, interior, and engine, depending on the model of Roush vehicle and the options ordered. Perhaps best known of these Roush-modified vehicles is the Ford Mustang, which in 2016 is available in the "RS" (3.7 liter V6, with body kit, stripes, wheels, and interior modifications only), "Stage 1" (standard 5.0 liter V8, with body kit, stripes, wheels, and interior modifications only), "Stage 2" (standard 5.0 liter V8, with body kit, stripes, wheels, suspension, and interior modifications only), and "Stage 3" (body kit, stripes, wheels, suspension, interior, and exhaust modifications, with the addition of an Eaton-supplied 2.3 liter TVS-2300 "roots-style" supercharger). The addition of the supercharger to the Ford-supplied 5.0 liter engine on the Stage 3 version results in a horsepower output of 670. All Roush factory cars are 50 state street legal.

All packages are available in both coupe and convertible models, in either manual or automatic transmission (automatics are special order only).

Roush has been modifying factory-born Ford Mustangs since 1995 on a limited-run basis, and made several numbered, limited-edition models:

- 360R (2002 only): 4.6L 2-valve V-8, supercharged.
- 380R (2003-2004): 4.6L 2-valve V-8, supercharged. 62 Units were produced in 2003 rated @ 379 HP
- 427R (2007–2010): 4.6L 3-valve V-8, supercharged (Black Eaton M90). Rated 415 horsepower (2007 only), and 435 horsepower (2008 - 2010. Smaller diameter pulley and revised tune).
- 427R Trak Pak (2008): 4.6L 3-valve V-8, supercharged (Black Eaton M90), coil-over track suspension, and other additions. Limited to 100 units. Rated 435 horsepower.
- 428R (2008): 4.6L 3-valve V-8, supercharged (Chrome Eaton M90). Limited to 200 units. Rated 435 horsepower.
- 429R (2009): 4.6L 3-valve V-8, supercharged (Chrome Eaton M90). Limited to 100 units. Rated 435 horsepower.
- Speedster (2008): 4.6L 3-valve V-8, supercharger option (Eaton M90). Automatic transmission only. White convertible with orange graphics only. Limited to 100 units. Rated 435 horsepower.
- P-51A (2008): 4.6L 3-valve V-8, forged rotating assembly factory installed, supercharged (TVS 2300), single belt FEAD. Limited to 151 units. Rated 510 horsepower.
- P-51B (2009): 4.6L 3-valve V-8, forged rotating assembly factory installed, supercharged (TVS 2300), dual belt FEAD. Limited to 51 units. Rated 510 horsepower.
- Blackjack (2007–2009): 4.6L 3-valve V-8, supercharged (Black Chrome Eaton M90). Depending on year, limited to under 200 units. Rated 435 horsepower.
- Stage 3 (2010-specific): 4.6L 3-valve V-8, forged rotating assembly factory installed, supercharged (TVS 2300), single belt FEAD. Rated 510 horsepower.
- 5XR (2011): 5.0L 4-valve V-8, supercharged (TVS 2300). Limited to 151 units. Rated 525 horsepower.
- Shamal 500R (2011): 5.0L 4-valve V-8, supercharged (TVS 2300), larger cooling system. Limited to 15 units (United Arab Emirates market only). Rated 525 horsepower.

All models are serialized with a unique plaque and other documentation (some as "limited edition" vehicles), and are registered with Roush Performance in order to avoid cloning.

The company also provides custom built engines for cars like the Superformance Shelby Daytona Coupe, or Brock Coupe as it is also known.

The company has served occasionally as a part-time sponsor for Roush's Xfinity Series teams.

== See also ==
- RFK Racing
