= Brock Coupe =

Only licensed continuation of the original Shelby Daytona coupe racing cars of the 1960s

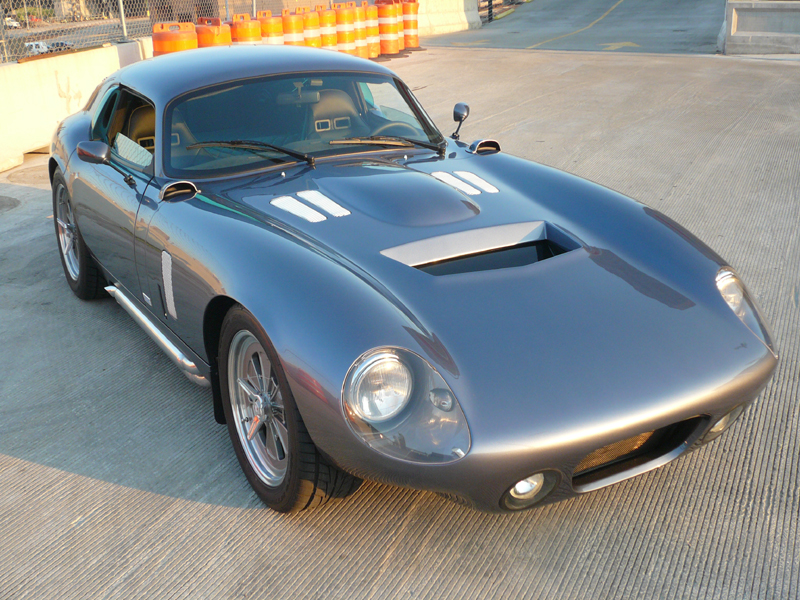
- Superformance Shelby Daytona Coupe

Overview
- Manufacturer: Superformance
- Also called: Superformance Coupe, Superformance Shelby Daytona Coupe
- Production: 1999–present
- Designer: Pete Brock, Bob Negstad

Body and chassis
- Class: Sports car
- Body style: Coupe
- Layout: Front mid-engine, rear-wheel drive
- Related: Shelby Daytona

Powertrain
- Engine: 6.4 L (392 cu in) V8; 6.6 L (402 cu in) V8; 7.0 L (427 cu in) V8
- Transmission: 5-speed manual; 6-speed manual

Dimensions
- Wheelbase: 2,370 mm (93.2 in)
- Length: 4,440 mm (175 in)
- Width: 1,870 mm (73.6 in)
- Curb weight: 1,330–1,380 kg (2,940–3,045 lb)

The Brock Coupe (also known as Superformance Coupe or Superformance Shelby Daytona Coupe) is the only licensed continuation of the original Shelby Daytona coupe racing cars of the 1960s. The car has a front mid-engine, rear-wheel drive layout, with a 55R/45F weight distribution.

The body was designed by Pete Brock (who designed the original race cars) and a chassis designed by Bob Negstad (who designed the original race chassis), it is viewed by many to be the most authentic modern continuation of the original, very limited run of Shelby Daytona coupes. It is the only Shelby Daytona coupe approved and licensed by Shelby and the only Shelby Daytona coupe aside from the original half-dozen cars eligible for the Shelby Registry.

Roush Performance is the official supplier of 50-state-legal engines for the coupe, and the majority of American owners choose a Roush engine based on a 351 Windsor block. Common displacements chosen for the car are 392, 402, and 427 cubic inches. Buyers also have a choice between five- and six-speed transmissions, the latter with a relatively wide choice of gear ratios. The car is considered by many to be an ideal compromise between a historically correct replica and a car suitable for the modern sports car buyer. The cars occupy a pricepoint above a Porsche 911 or Aston Martin V8 Vantage but below a Lamborghini Gallardo or Aston Martin DB9 where few other front-engined GT cars with more than 500 horsepower are available.

About 130 such cars exist as of the autumn of 2007, most of them in the United States.

One special Superformance Shelby Daytona Coupe was painted Portofino Blue and given white roundels and number ten racing numbers to make it visually similar to the car that won the GT class at 12 Hours of Sebring 1964. This so-called "tribute" car sold for $270,000, at Barrett-Jackson's autumn 2006 auction, though much controversy continues in the enthusiast community as to whether this price was representative of the state of the market in such cars.

== Gallery ==
Example of a Shelby Daytona coupe produced by Superformance (chassis #0121, manufactured in South Africa). This particular car is outfitted with a Roush 402SR engine and a Tremec T-56 transmission:

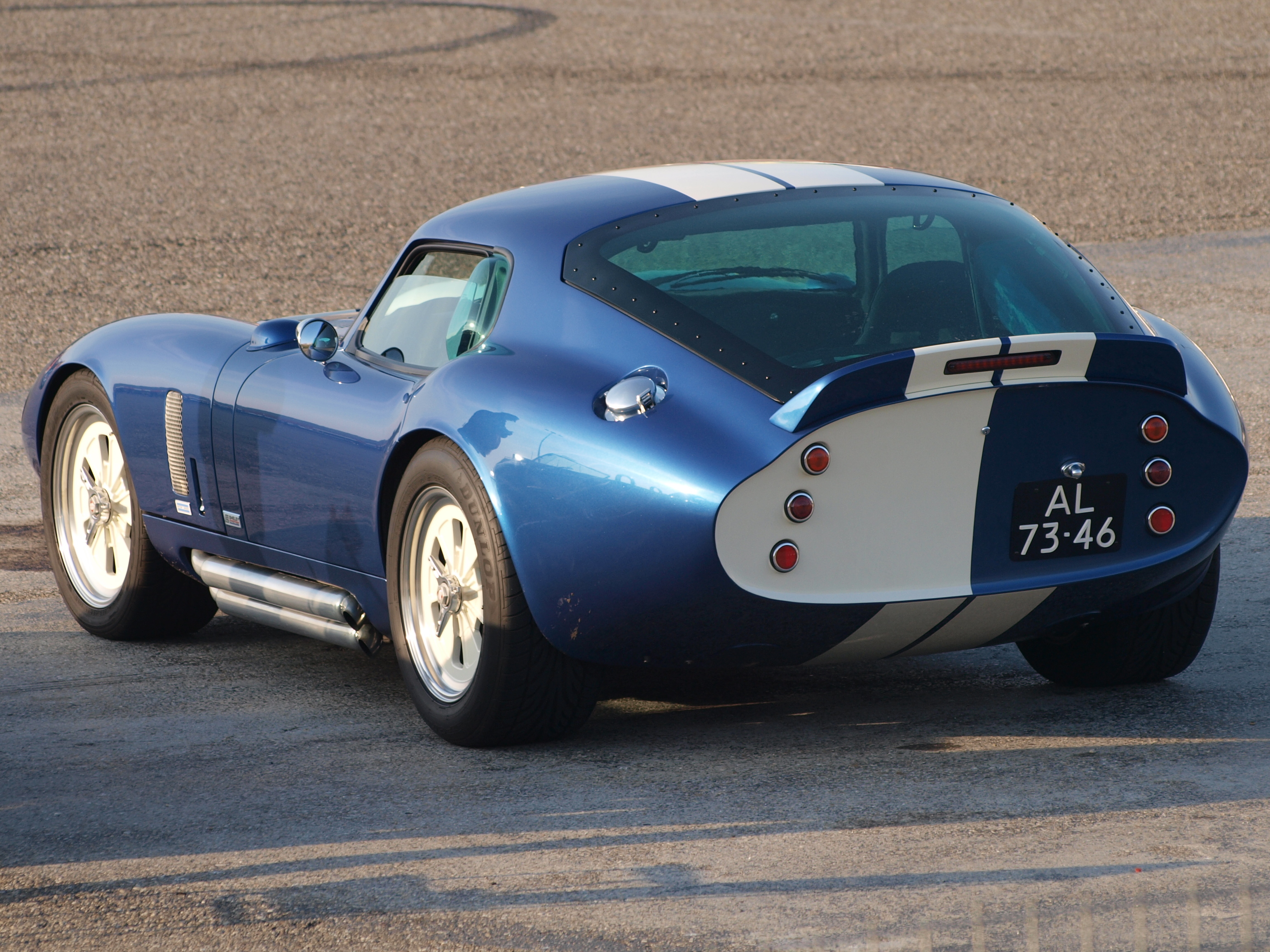
Rear

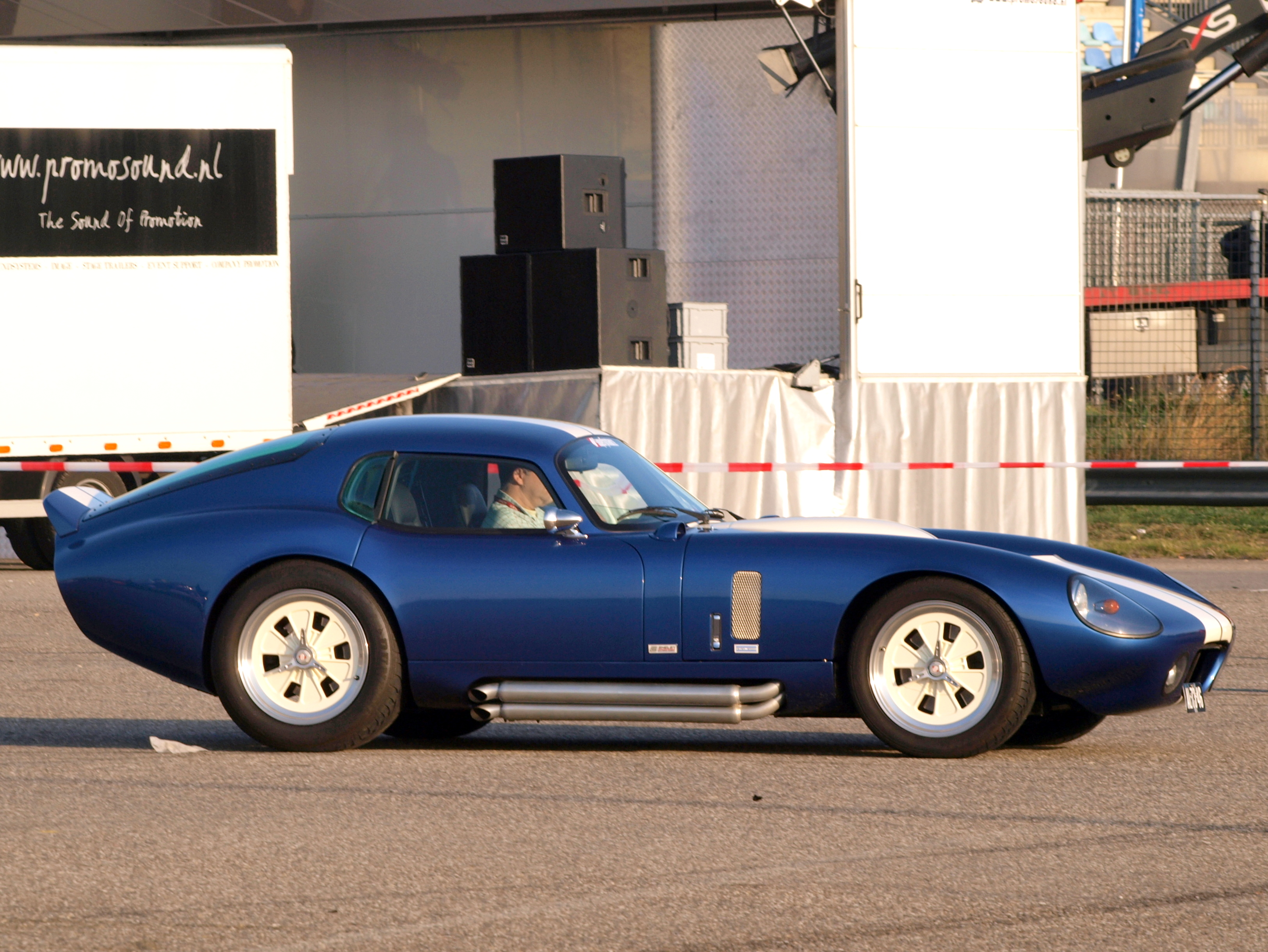
Profile

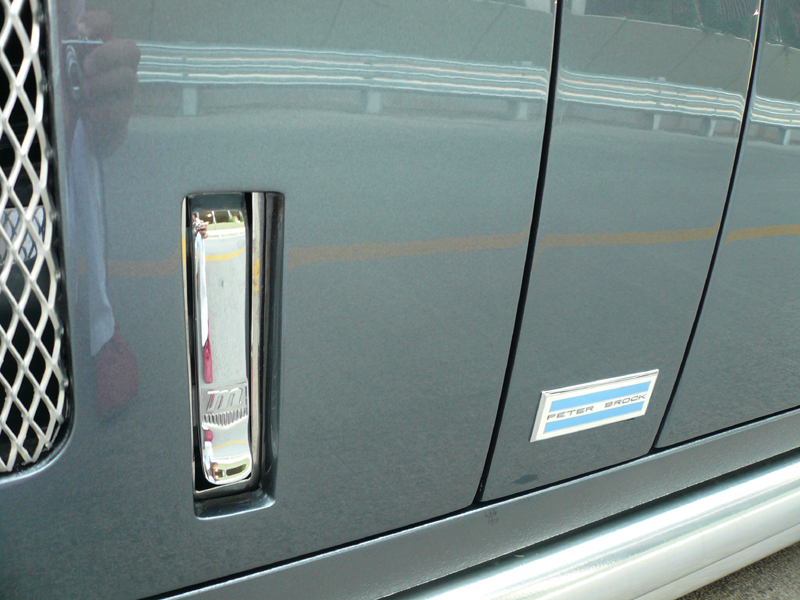
Brock name badge

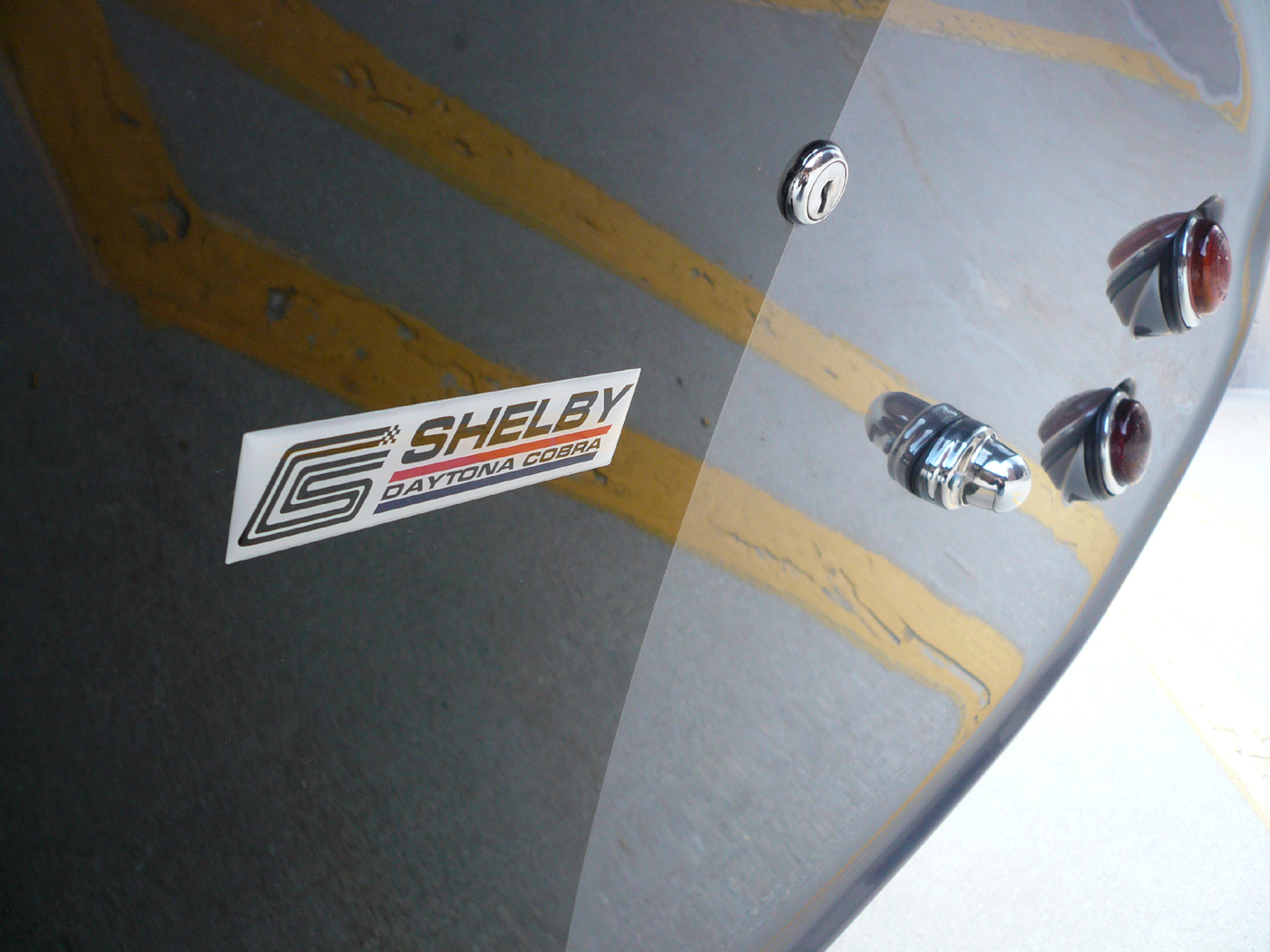
Shelby name badge

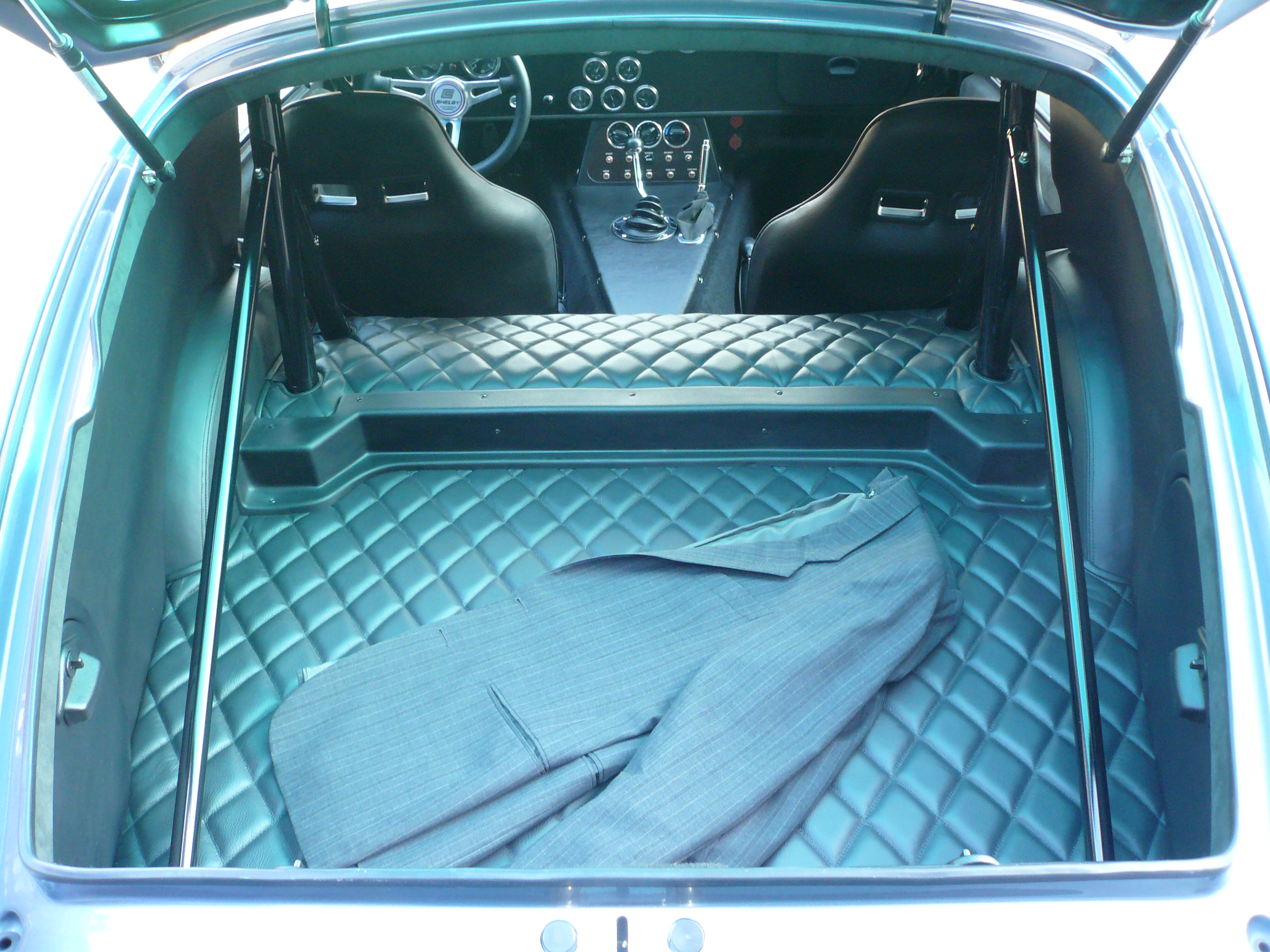
Interior from rear

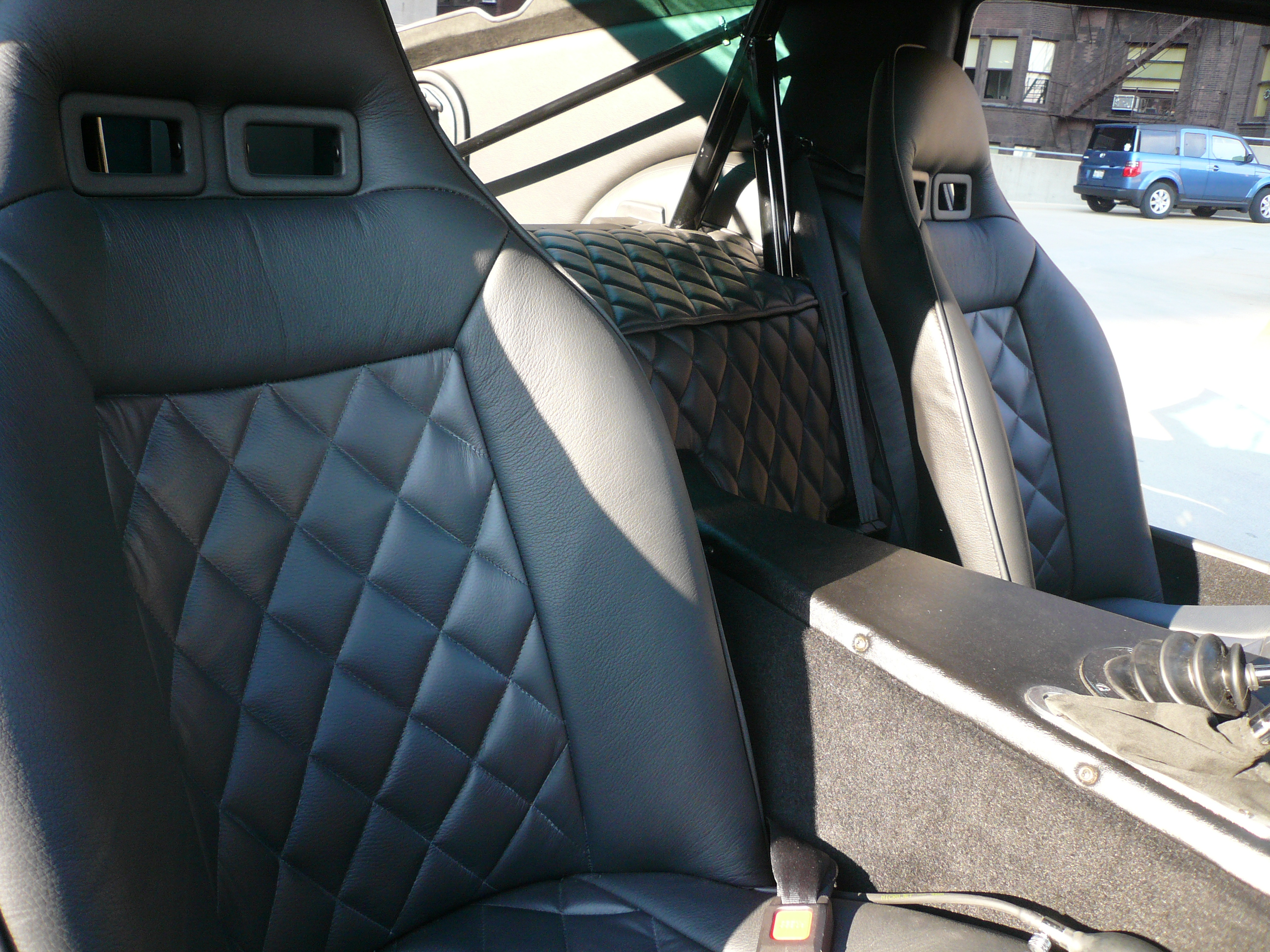
Interior from right

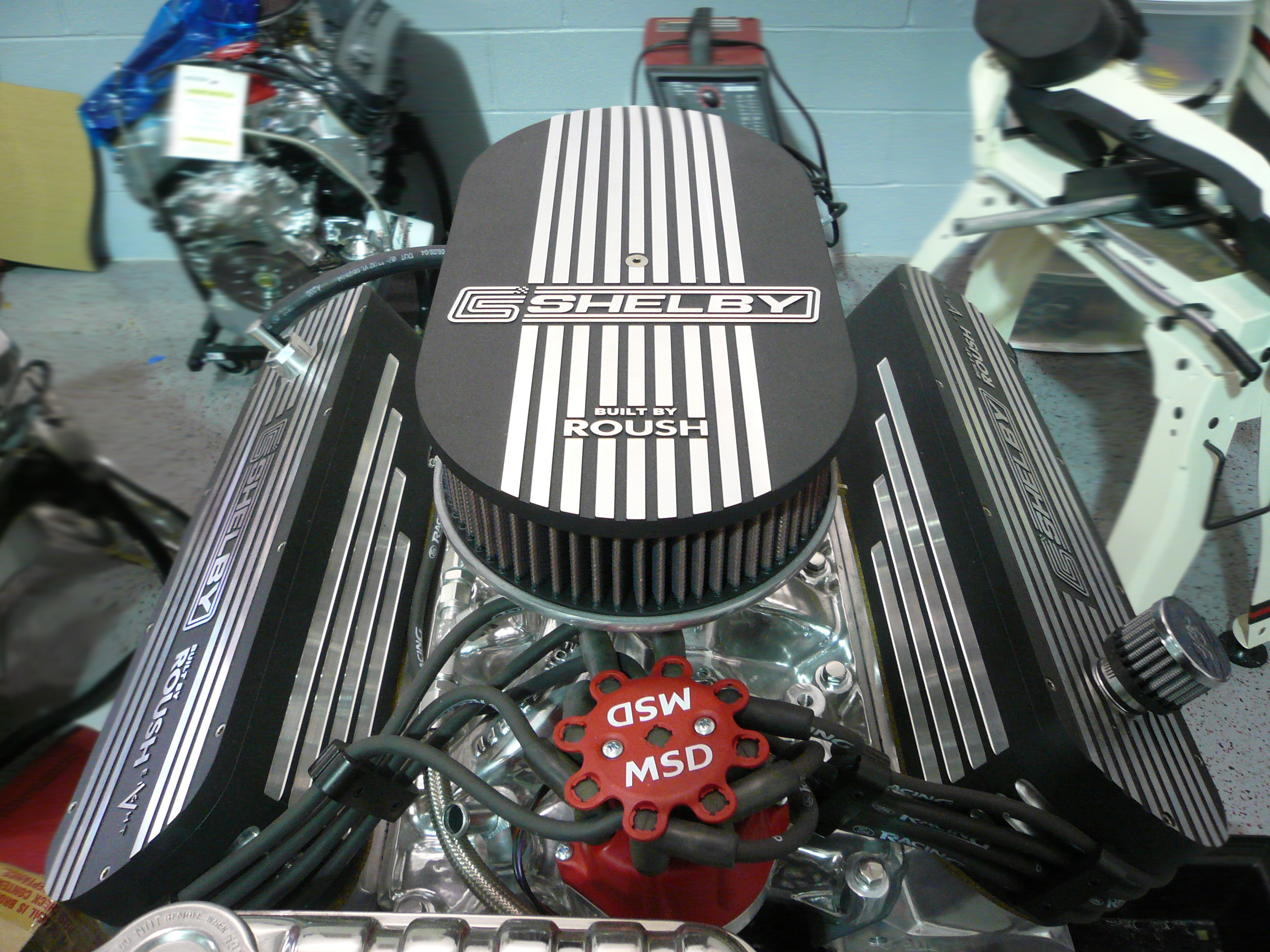
Roush 402SR engine

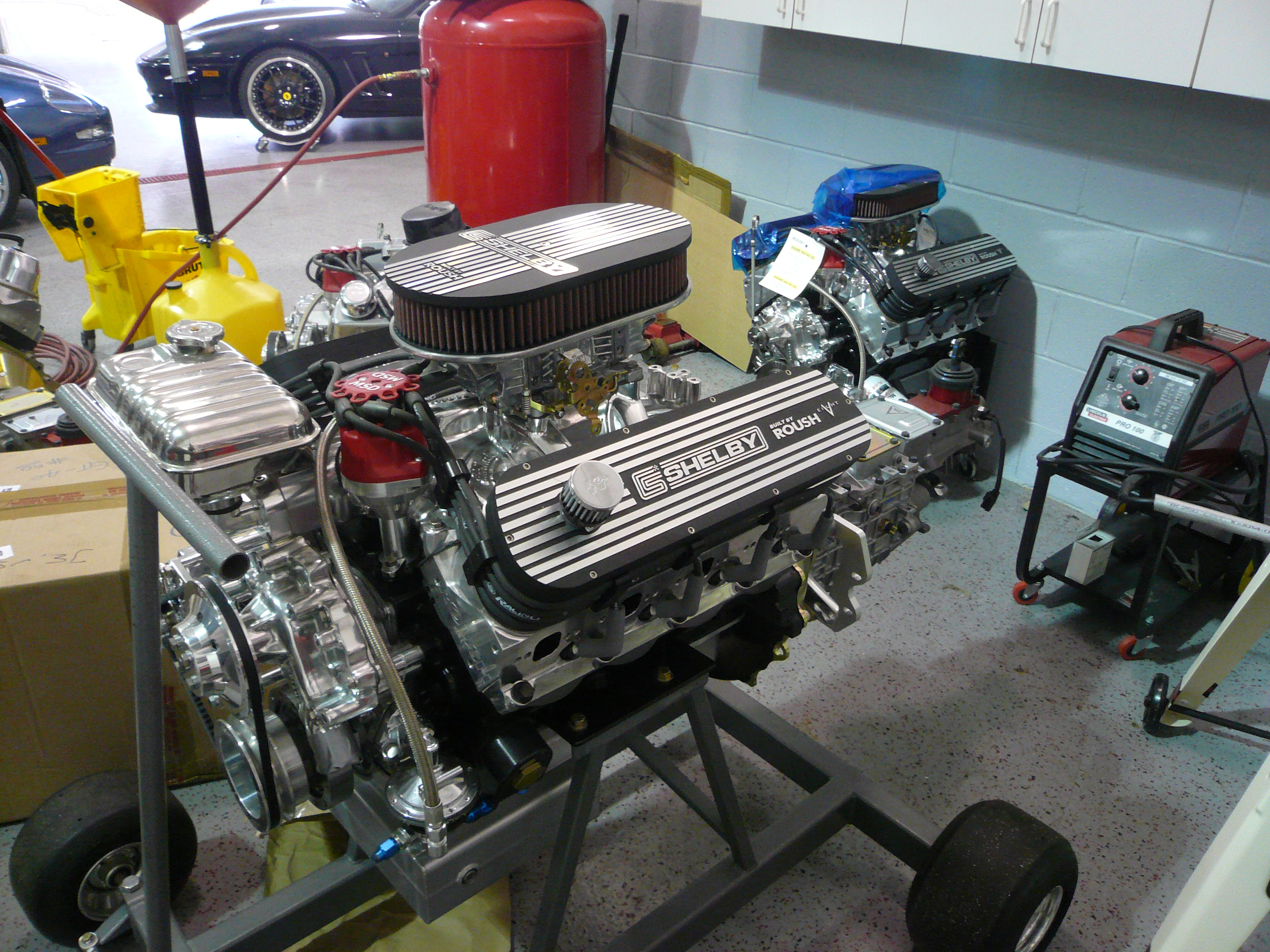
Roush 402SR engine
