= De Tomaso Sport 5000 =

Motor vehicle

De Tomaso Sport 5000 Fantuzzi Spyder Ghia DeTomaso De Tomaso 70P De Tomaso P70
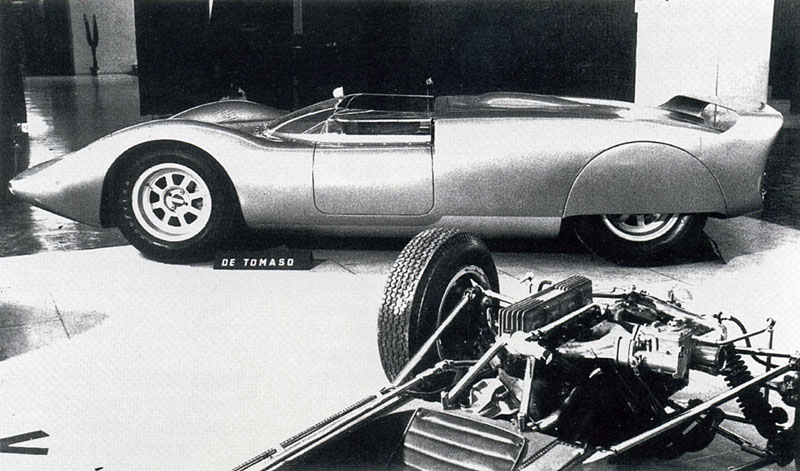
- Constructor: De Tomaso/Fantuzzi
- Designer(s): Pete Brock

Technical specifications
- Chassis: Aluminium body on steel backbone chassis
- Suspension (front): Double wishbone suspension with coil springs over tubular shock absorbers
- Suspension (rear): Reversed lower wishbone suspension with top links, twin trailing arms and coil springs over tubular shock absorbers
- Length: 4,084 mm (160.8 in)
- Width: 1,765 mm (69.5 in)
- Axle track: Front: 1,359 mm (53.5 in); Rear: 1,384 mm (54.5 in)
- Wheelbase: 2,362 mm (93.0 in)
- Engine: Ford 289 cu in (4,736 cc) 16-valve, OHV V8, naturally aspirated, mid-engined, longitudinally mounted
- Transmission: 5-speed manual transmission
- Weight: 660 kg (1,455.1 lb)

Competition history
- Notable entrants: De Tomaso
- Notable drivers: Pierre Noblet; Franco Bernabei; Umberto Maglioli; Roberto Bussinello
- Debut: 1966 Mugello Grand Prix
Races	Wins	Poles	F/Laps
1 (3 entries)	0	0	0
- Teams' Championships: 0
- Constructors' Championships: 0
- Drivers' Championships: 0

The De Tomaso Sport 5000 (also known as the Ghia DeTomaso, the De Tomaso 70P, or the De Tomaso P70) was a short-lived sports racing car built by De Tomaso in 1965. Fitted with a 289 cu in (4,736 cc) Ford V8 engine, the Sport 5000 was initially designed to be used as a Grand Tourer; however, only one car was ever built of the planned fifty, meaning that it competed solely as a sports prototype in just one race, the 1966 World Sportscar Championship Mugello 500 km.

== Design and development ==
Towards the end of 1965, Alejandro de Tomaso, the owner of De Tomaso, decided to respond to criticism about the firm's Vallelunga lacking power. Carroll Shelby sourced a 289 cu in (4,736 cc) Ford V8 engine (tuned to provide around 475 hp (354 kW; 482 PS) at 7,300 rpm), and also commissioned Pete Brock to design the car's open-top aluminium bodywork. Using the unique backbone chassis of the Vallelunga, with only a few modifications, the Sport 5000 was built in Italy, by local metalworkers. However, Shelby was unhappy with the resulting bodywork, and sent Brock to work alongside Medardo Fantuzzi to redevelop it; the resulting car, which featured a moveable rear wing and full doors, was christened as the De Tomaso 70P, or De Tomaso P70. However, before the end of 1965, Shelby withdrew from the project, instead turning his attention to the struggling Ford GT40 project. As a result, De Tomaso turned to Ghia, and the car became known as the Ghia DeTomaso. The car made its first public appearance at the Turin Motor Show in November 1965, with striking red bodywork. The car would appear again at the Modena Racing Car Show in February 1966, and was featured on the front cover of Road & Track magazine a month later. Due in part to the withdrawal of Shelby, only one P70 was built; however, Brock had stayed on as part of the project, and was intended to be the car's American distributor. Prior to the car's racing debut, De Tomaso modified the design and built a 2nd car to be used in European races under the name of Sport 5000. The car was raced in a hillclimb alongside a Ferrari 250LM, but was unable to finish the race.

1965 De Tomaso Sport 5000 Spyder

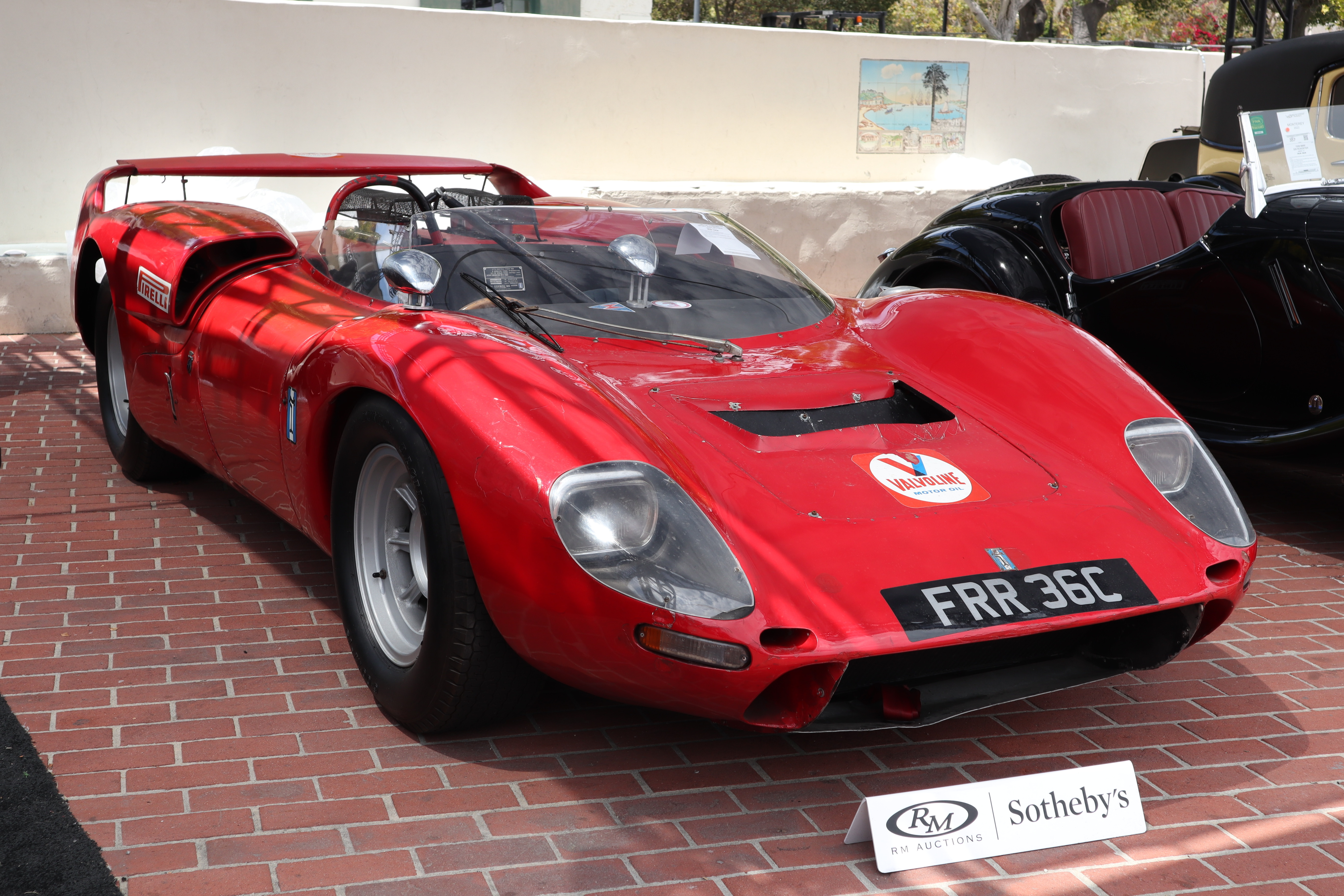
Front view

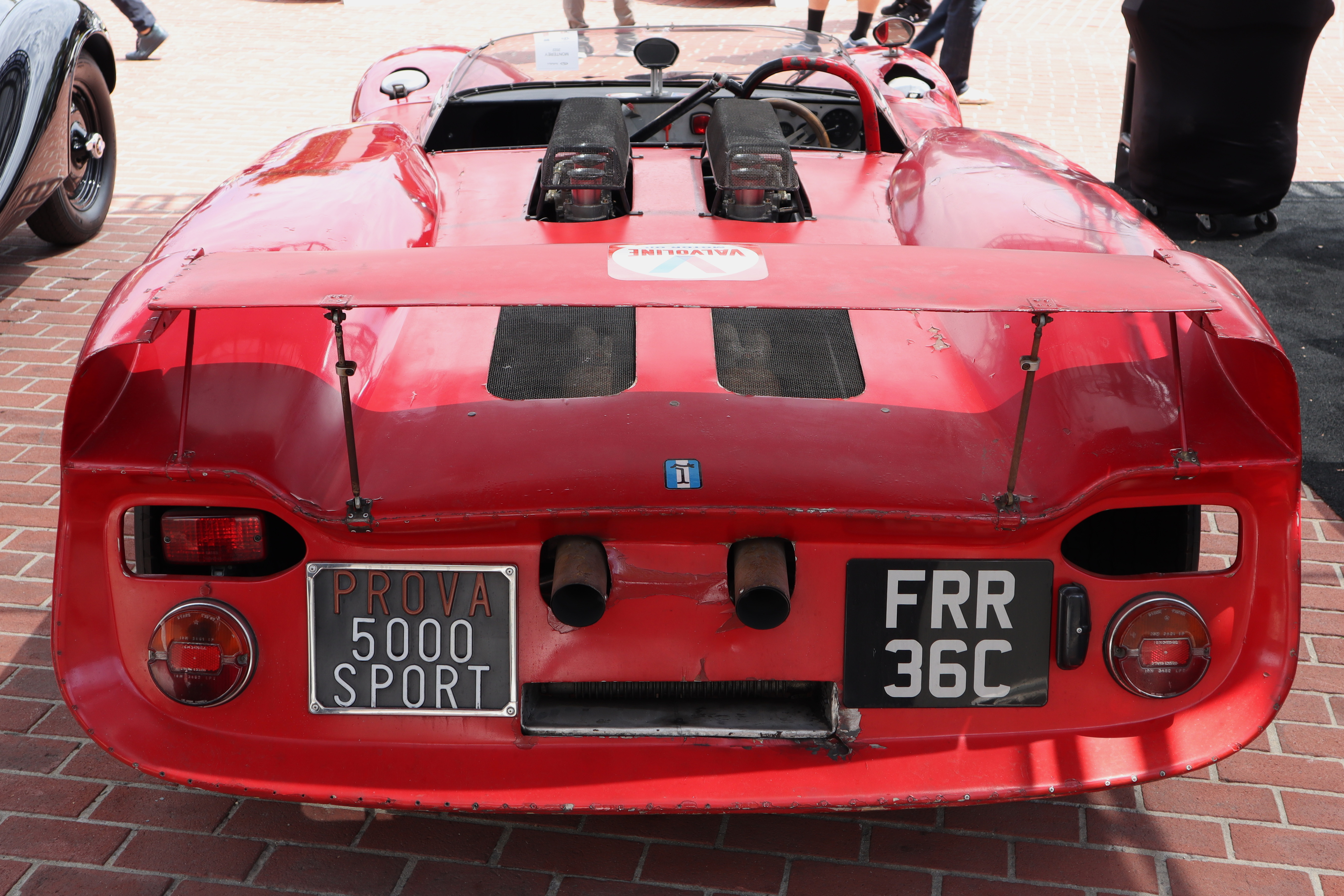
Rear view

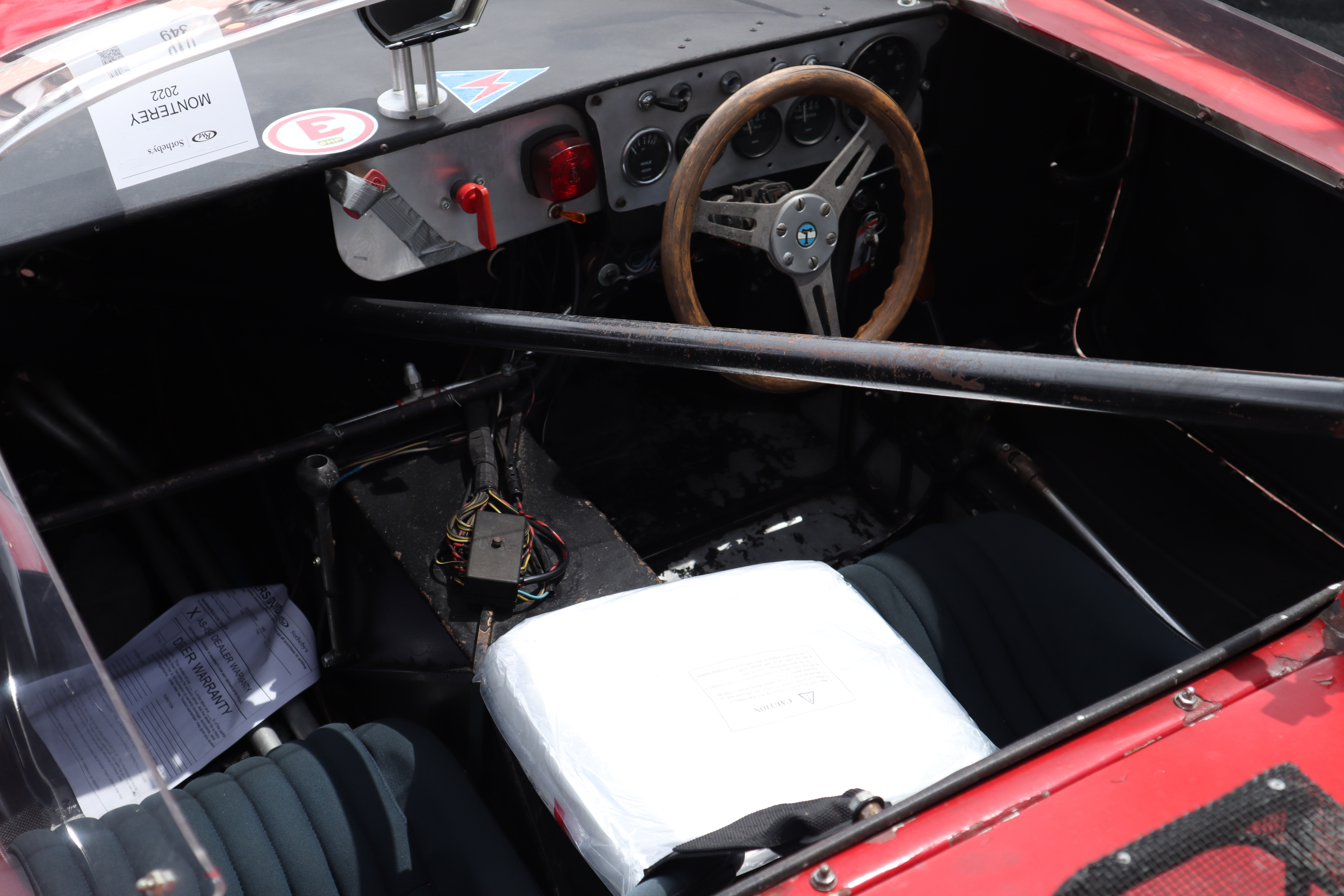
Interior

== Racing history ==
De Tomaso had attempted to enter the Sebring 12 Hours in March 1966, with the Italian trio of Pierre Noblet, Franco Bernabei and Umberto Maglioli selected to drive; however, they withdrew from the event and did not compete. It would be another three months before another Sport 5000 entry was lodged, but De Tomaso's attempt to run Noblet and Bernabei at the 24 Hours of Le Mans was rejected by that event's organizers. The car finally made its debut in July, where Roberto Bussinello drove the car in the Mugello Grand Prix round of the World Sportscar Championship; however, he retired on the opening lap.

== Later history ==
Following the unsuccessful Mugello race, the Sport 5000 was mothballed, and never raced again. The rear-end design of the car was used on the Brock-designed Hino Samurai racing car, whilst the running gear was later used in De Tomaso's Mangusta road car. The Sport 5000 would remain at the De Tomaso factory until 2004, when VDV Grant purchased the car, following Alejandro de Tomaso's death that year.
