= Superformance =

American automobile company

Superformance LLC
- Type: Private (since 2005)
- Industry: Automotive
- Founded: 1996
- Headquarters: Irvine, California, United States of America
- Key people: Lance Stander, Current CEO; Jim Price, Former President & Founder
- Products: Turnkey Replicars
- Website: www.superformance.com

Superformance LLC (Superformance Replicars) is an American automobile company that builds, designs, develops, engineers and markets sports cars, related performance components and full replicars. The company was founded as "Superformance International Inc." by Hi-Tech Automotive Ltd. in 1996. Today, Superformance has 15 authorized dealers in the United States and 6 international dealers. SPF cars are sold as "turnkey-minus replacers". In December 2005, Hi-Tech Automotive transferred the ownership of its subsidiary, Superformance, to American Hillbank Automotive Group, which is a privately owned business of American entrepreneur Lance Stander. Hi-Tech Automotive continue to build Superformance cars at its plant in Port Elizabeth, South Africa.

== Current models ==
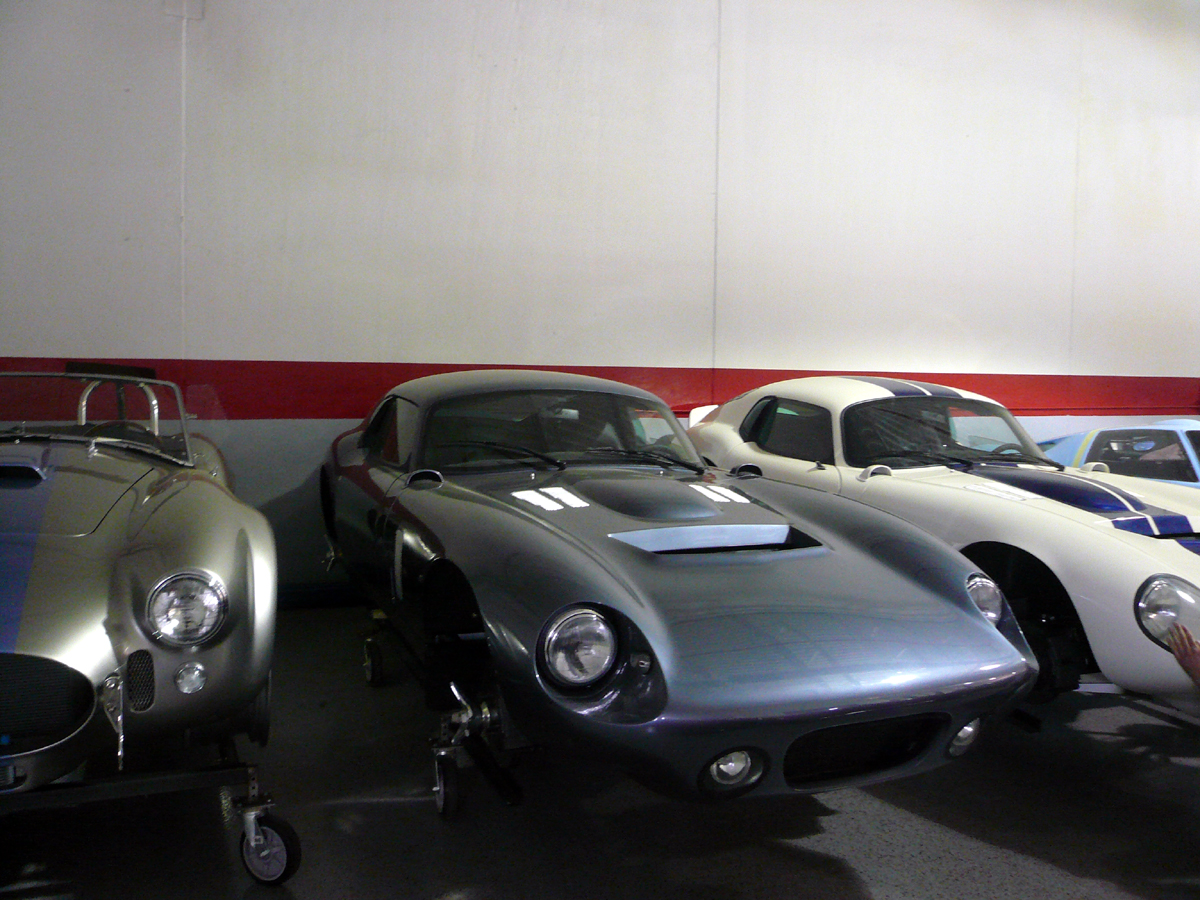
An example of a Superformance Shelby Daytona Coupe "roller" immediately after being unpacked from its container.

As "Replicars", all models sold by Superformance are complete factory manufactured "rollers", only missing the engine and transmission. Individual Superformance dealers will install selected engines in the cars after the customer has bought the roller.

=== Superformance MKIII ===
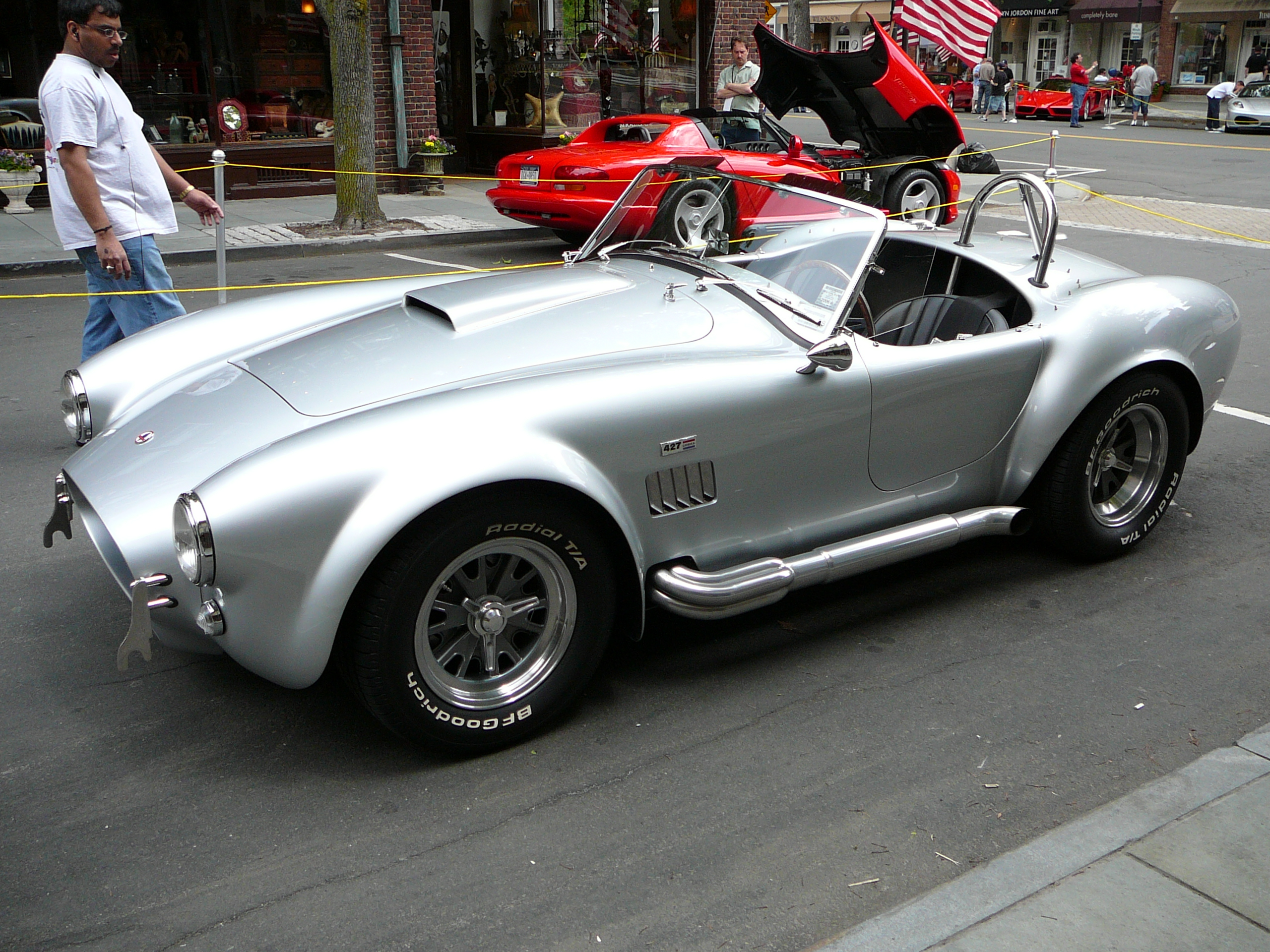
Superformance MKIII at the Scarsdale Concours

The Superformance MKIII is a replica of the third generation 427 Shelby Cobra and is available in both semi-competition and street roadster body styles. The SPF MKIII makes up the bulk of the company's sales. The SPF MKIII is also one of the few Shelby Cobra replicas built under license from Carroll Shelby. When the Customer purchases a MKIII they receive a complete rolling chassis that only requires an engine with accessories, transmission, drive shaft and various hoses, nuts and bolts to complete. The car is complete with suspension, rear differential, wiring and instrumentation. In this way a MKIII can have a stable "factory" build quality and also be personalized by its owner/completion company.

While most MKIIIs are powered by 351 Windsor-based Ford engines, options for 289/302 blocks and big block FE or 385 family Ford engines are possible. The MKIII differs from most other Cobra replicas as being of 100% new parts and not decades old rebuilt items. The current MKIII (late 2007+ production) uses Wilwood disk brakes and a Dana rear end assembly. Other major components are off-the-shelf parts of various new OEM manufacturers. The MKIII enjoys a loyal and helpful owners network that communicate in various internet forums/clubs providing user-to-user technical support and suggestions. The MKIII car was featured in an article in the September 2008 issue of Classic Motorsports magazine.

The Superformance MKIII is built under license from Carroll Shelby.

=== Superformance MKII Slab Side and FIA ===
The newest models, the Superformance MKII Slab Side and FIA are designed to emulate the Cobra 289 street cars from the era of 1960s racing. Unlike most competitors, these Superformance replicas of the Slab Side and FIA are built on the Tojeiro-styled round tube chassis and features an authentic transverse leaf spring suspension. The MKII Slab Side and FIA are the latest licensed Shelby product in the Superformance lineup.

=== Shelby Daytona Coupe – CSX9000 Series ===
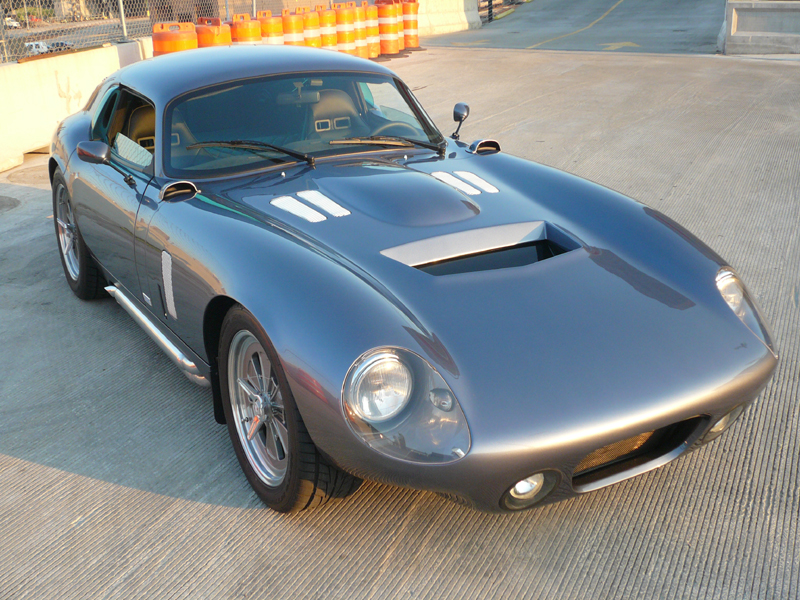
Superformance Shelby Cobra Daytona Coupe in Chicago

The Shelby Daytona Coupe or CSX9000 Series, originally known as the "SPF Brock Coupe", is a continuation of the 1965 FIA GT World Championship-winning Shelby Cobra Daytona Coupe. The SPF Coupe was designed by Peter Brock, the designer of the original Daytona Coupe for Shelby American.

Production of the SPF Coupe ran from 2003 to 2009. Several modifications were made to the car and it is now being sold as the Shelby Cobra Daytona Coupe (CSX9000 series) through authorized Shelby Automobile dealers. Unlike other Superformance replicars, the CSX9000 coupe is available with either a fiberglass or aluminum body.

The Shelby Daytona Cobra Coupe is licensed by Carroll Shelby and each vehicle and owner is recorded into the Shelby registry.

=== Superformance GT40 continuation series ===
The first Superformance GT40s to be built are replicas of the Ford GT40 MkII A that finished first, second, and third overall at the Le Mans 24 Hour Race in 1966. The Superformance GT40 differs from other Ford GT40 replicas in that it is the "only one to be built with a monocoque chassis that is an exact replica of the original". In fact, over 90% of the SPF GT40's parts are interchangeable with the original MkII A. The Superformance GT40 is so close to the original that it is currently being evaluated for historic racing eligibility. Some major differences between the two cars include the addition of a hidden air conditioning unit, modern brakes, and a conversion to left hand drive layout. Right hand drive, non-airconditioned versions are also available, marketed as the GT40/R. The Superformance GT40 has the "Gurney bump" which can be ordered as an option for taller drivers.

The Superformance GT40 is an authorized continuation series, licensed by Safir Spares LLC.

Upcoming versions will include the MkI and FIA versions.

=== Corvette Grand Sport continuation series ===
In January 2009, Superformance and the Duntov Motor Company LLC of Farmers Branch TX announced a partnership to create a continuation series of the street version of the legendary 1963 Corvette Grand Sport (Duntov will produce the racing version under the agreement).

The Superformance Corvette Grand Sport is being built true to the original body shape and configuration, and is available in both coupe and roadster body styles. All new precise modern production molds have been produced to assure consistent and correct bodies. Superformance built street cars feature the original Grand Sport round tube style frame. Superformance Corvette Grand Sports have power brakes, power windows and locks with all the amenities needed in a modern high-performance automobile. As with its other cars, the Superformance Corvette Grand Sport is offered as a complete turnkey-minus unit ready to accept the customer's choice of engine and transmission.

A continuation of the 1963 Corvette Grand Sport is built by Superformance under license from General Motors Company.

== Former models ==
=== Superformance S-1 roadster ===
The Superformance S-1 roadster is a modern rendition of the Lotus Super 7. The S-1 was specifically conceived to accommodate “6-foot 4-inch, 250-pound Americans,” a feat that few Lotus 7 replicas could accomplish. Apart from the increased size, the S-1 has several aerodynamically beneficial features, weatherproof soft top, windows, adjustable foot pedals, heated front windshield, primitive interior heating, as well as a 5-cubic-foot (140 L) lockable trunk. Front suspension uses double A-arms, while the rear uses a solid axle controlled by a "Mumford link" with bel-crank operated coil-over shocks. The SPF S-1s are generally powered by a version of Ford's 2.0L Zetec inline-4 and are usually naturally aspirated although a few supercharged examples were produced. A Ford Type-9 5-speed manual transmission is usually installed. The production run of the S-1 ended in March 2004 after a total of 56 cars had been produced.

== Caterham distribution ==
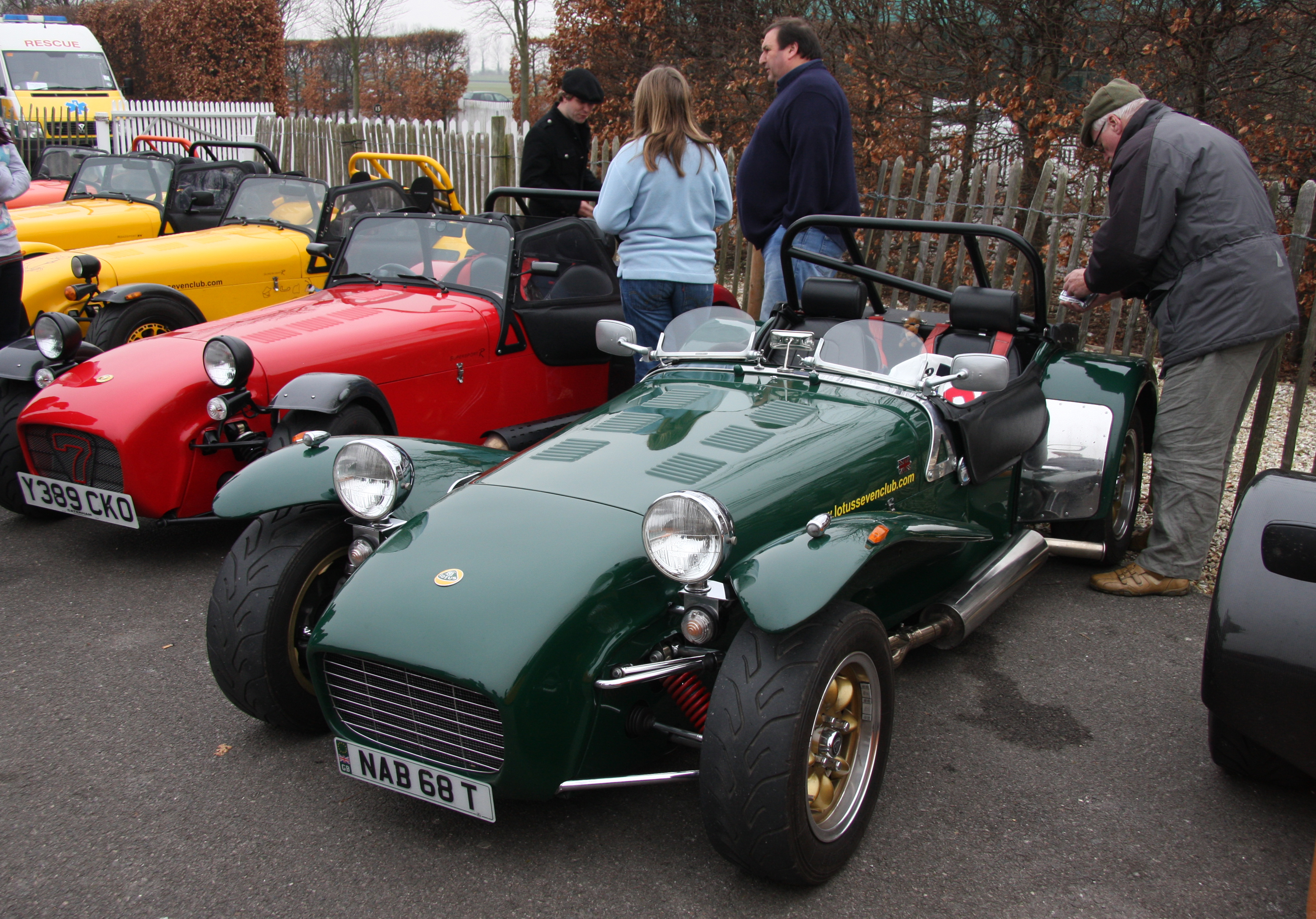
Caterham Series 3 Super Seven

As of the start of 2014, Superformance is the official distributor for Caterham in the United States. International demand for Caterham Sevens have increased dramatically in part due to the addition of a F1 Race team and the changes in Caterham's structure focusing on the distribution of the Seven worldwide. Caterham has since introduced a new model line up and focused on their production and production times to better suite their new international market, making their partnership with Superformance possible. Superformance will stock a range of Seven variants, primarily the higher-power incarnations of the car, which have traditionally been more popular in the American market. The range will include the Seven 160, Seven 280, Seven 360, Seven 480 and the new Seven 620R. Sevens will be shipped to the US in part-built form and sold as rolling chassis via Superformance's nationwide dealer network for customers to then complete the build personally.

== See also ==
- Carroll Shelby International
- Perana Performance Group
- Caterham Cars
