= Ford Shelby Cobra Concept =

Ford Shelby Cobra
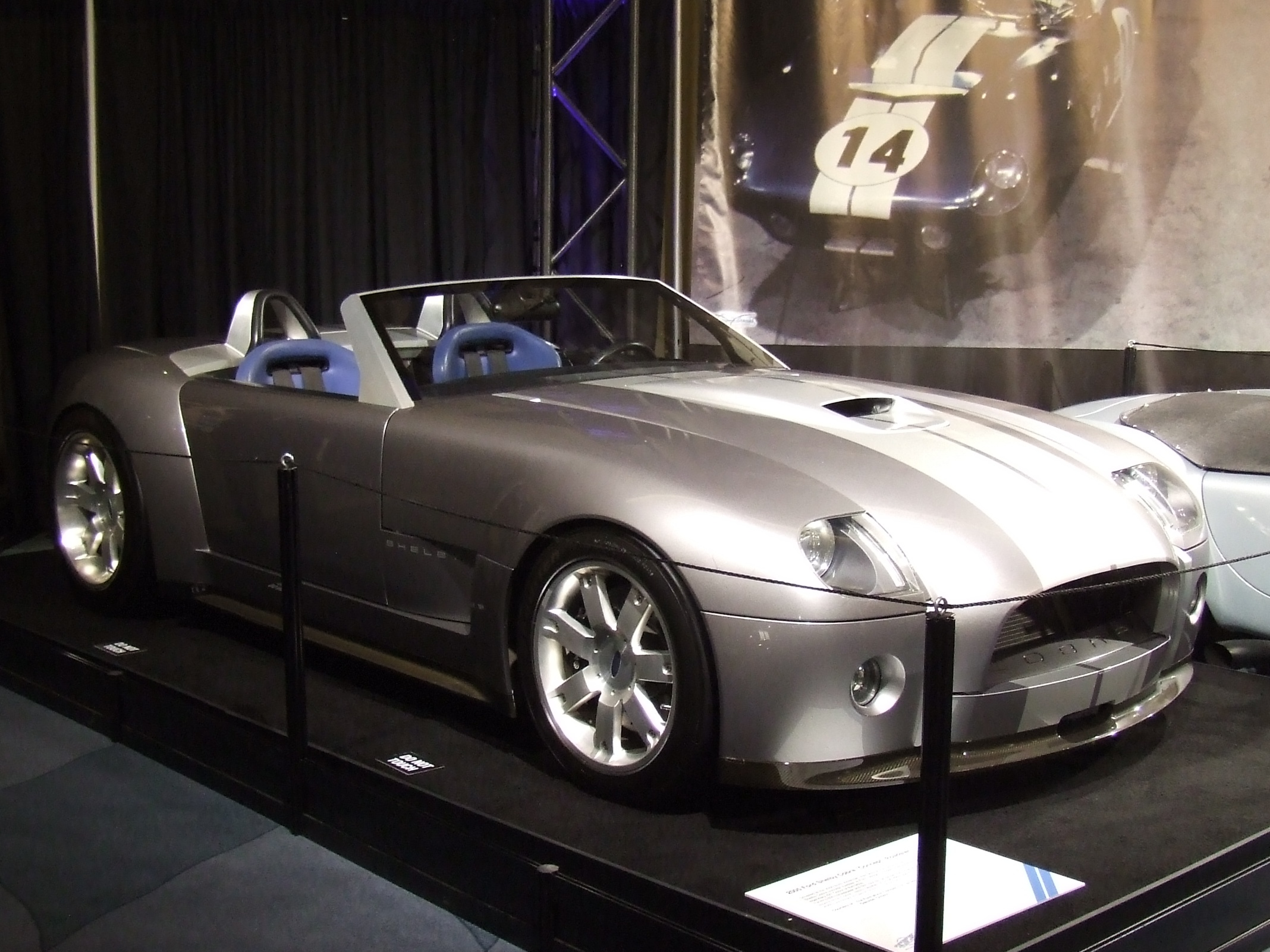

Overview
- Manufacturer: Ford
- Designer: Advanced Product Creation; Carroll Shelby

Body and chassis
- Class: Concept sports car (S)
- Body style: 2-door roadster
- Layout: FR layout
- Related: Shelby Cobra

Powertrain
- Engine: 6.4 L V10
- Transmission: 6-speed manual

Dimensions
- Curb weight: 3,075.4 lb (1,395 kg)

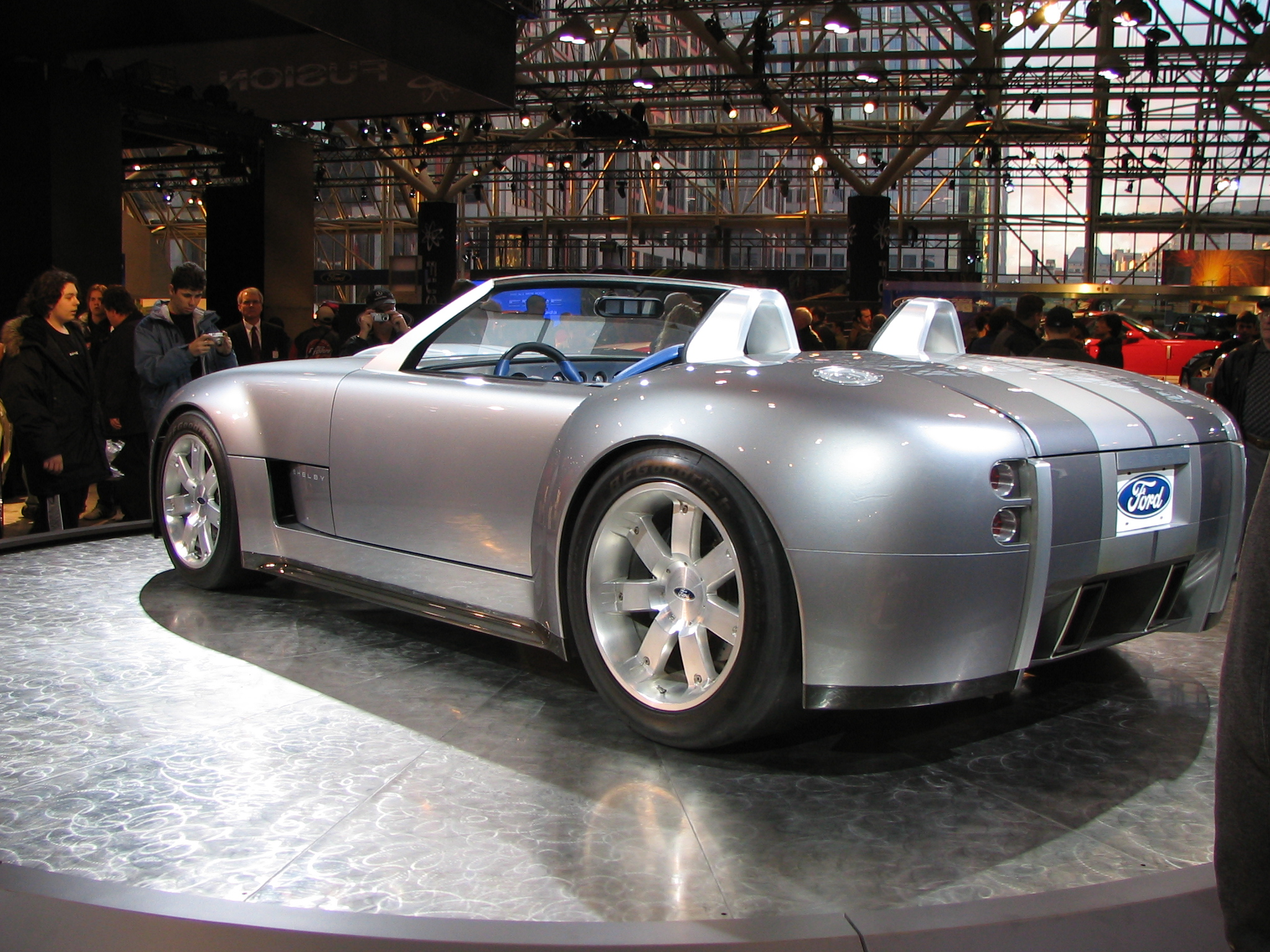
The rear 3/4 view of the Shelby Cobra concept.

The Ford Shelby Cobra is a concept car that Ford unveiled at the 2004 North American International Auto Show in Detroit, Michigan. The Shelby Cobra concept is a roadster inspired by the original AC Cobra that AC Cars developed in 1961.

== Development and design ==
Ford's Advanced Product Creation team designed and built the Shelby Cobra concept in five months. The project was led by Manfred Rumpel. Like several other Ford vehicles developed in the early 2000s (such as the GT40 concept, the GT and the fifth-generation Mustang), the Shelby Cobra concept is a modern interpretation of an older vehicle.

In the case of the Shelby Cobra, the design is reminiscent of the AC Cobra MkI. The first Cobra featured a large, high-performance Ford Windsor engine inside a small roadster that AC Cars had modified at Shelby's request. Likewise, the Shelby Cobra concept car is small and minimalist, eschewing conveniences found in most modern cars (such as air conditioning, a radio, anti-lock brakes, and even windshield wipers). In a press release to announce the debut of the concept car in 2004, Shelby echoed the aim of the design team: "That's the formula [...] It's a massive motor in a tiny, lightweight car."

=== Engine ===
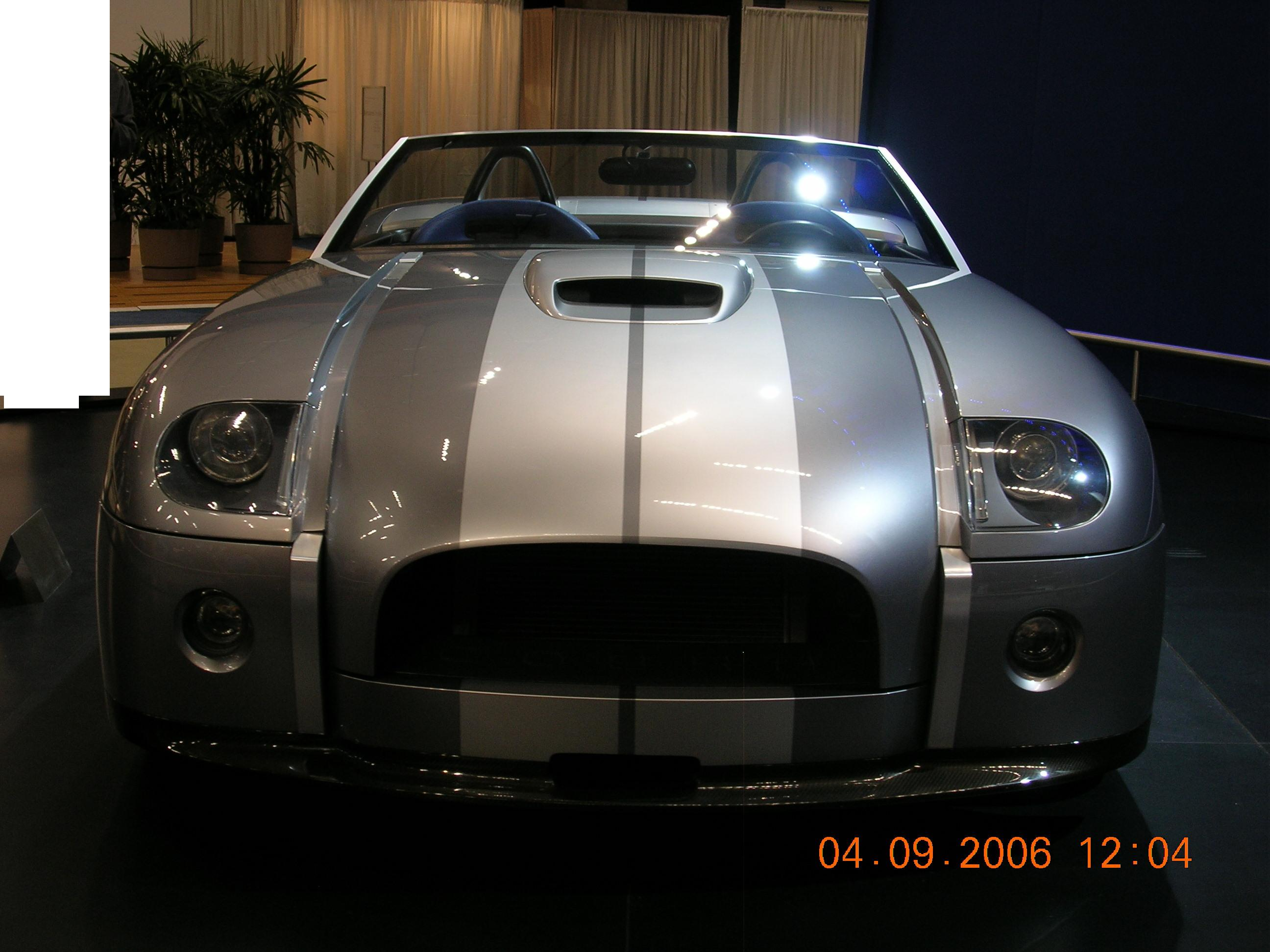
The front of the Shelby Cobra concept.

The Shelby Cobra concept features an all-aluminum, V10 engine, displacing 6.4 L (390 cu in) that produces 645 hp (481 kW) at 6,750 rpm and 501 ft⋅lbf (679 N⋅m) of torque at 5,500 rpm. The engine redlines at 6,800 rpm, and Ford claims it is capable of reaching 207 mph (333 km/h), though the car is reportedly electronically limited to only 100 mph (161 km/h).

The double overhead cam cylinder heads and cylinders are fed by port fuel injection and racing-derived velocity stacks that are just visible within the hood scoop. For a low hood line, the throttles are a slide-plate design. The lubrication system is the dry-sump type, which relocates oil from underneath the engine to a remote tank.

=== Chassis ===
The chassis of the Shelby Cobra concept was based on an aluminum chassis used on the GT production car, and modified to suit the concept car's front-mid engine placement. In fact, many parts of the GT were adapted for use in the Cobra, such as the suspension, several components of the frame, and the mounting brackets for the transmission (which is placed in the rear on the Cobra). Despite sharing large portions of its chassis with the Ford GT, the Shelby Cobra concept is almost 2 feet (0.61 m) shorter overall and has a wheelbase 7 inches (180 mm) shorter than the GT.

=== Body and interior ===
Although the Shelby Cobra concept was aimed to reflect the design of the AC Cobra, the concept is dimensionally very different from the original. However, the design includes many common external features, such as a large grille opening, side vents, and large wheel arches. In line with Carroll Shelby's designs, the concept has a very minimalist look, which is continued in the interior. The concept omits many features common in modern cars, such as air conditioning and a radio. The placement of the transmission in the rear allowed for the driver and passenger seats to be placed closer together, adding to the compactness of the Cobra.

== Promotional items and media appearances ==
The car appears in the 2005 film xXx: State of the Union.

The car appears as a playable vehicle in Asphalt: Urban GT, Project Gotham Racing 3, Test Drive Unlimited, and Midnight Club: Los Angeles.

Hot Wheels released a 1/64 scale die-cast model of the car and a larger 1/18 scale version.

== See also ==
- AC Cobra
- Carroll Shelby
- Ford Motor Company
