= Reunion Arena =

Former indoor arena in Dallas, Texas, US

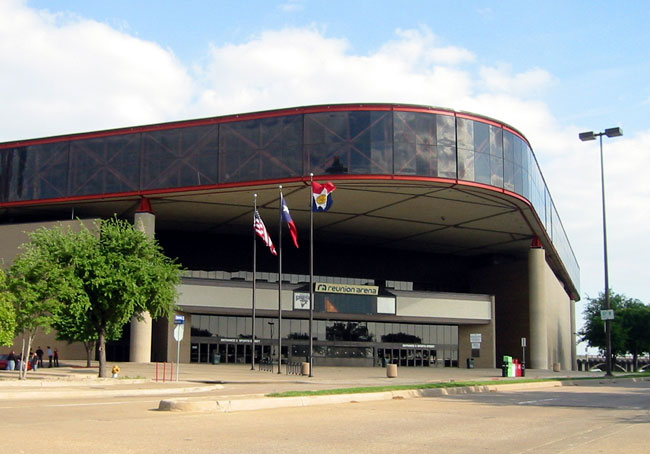
- Reunion Arena in 2004
- Interactive map of Reunion Arena
- Location: 777 Sports Street; Dallas, Texas 75207 U.S.
- Coordinates: 32°46′22″N 96°48′29″W
- Owner: City of Dallas
- Operator: City of Dallas
- Capacity: Basketball: 17,772 (1980–81); 17,134 (1981–83); 17,007 (1983–91); 17,502 (1991–96); 18,042 (1996–98); 18,121 (1998–99); 18,190 (1999–2008); Ice hockey: 16,500 (1980–91); 16,914 (1991–95); 16,924 (1995–97); 16,928 (1997–99); 17,000 (1999–2008); Indoor soccer: 16,626 (1993–04); Concerts: End Stage: 18,630; Center Stage: 19,070; Half House: 9,663
- Scoreboard: American Sign & Indicator, now Trans-Lux

Construction
- Groundbreaking: March 15, 1978; 48 years ago
- Opened: April 28, 1980; 46 years ago
- Closed: June 30, 2008; 18 years ago
- Demolished: November 17, 2009; 16 years ago
- Cost: US$27 million ($106 million in 2025 dollars)
- Architect: Harwood K. Smith & Partners, Inc.
- Structural engineers: HKS, Inc., Paul Gugliotta Consulting Engineers, Inc.
- General contractor: Henry C. Beck Co.

Tenants
- Dallas Mavericks (NBA) (1980–2001); Dallas Tornado (NASL indoor) (1980–1981); Dallas Sidekicks (MISL/CISL/WISL/MISL II) (1984–2004); Dallas Texans (AFL) (1990–1993); Dallas Stars (NHL) (1993–2001); Dallas Stallions (RHI) (1999); Dallas Desperados (AFL) (2003)

Reunion Arena was a multi-purpose indoor arena located in the Reunion district of downtown Dallas, Texas, United States. The arena served as the primary home of the National Hockey League's (NHL) Dallas Stars and the National Basketball Association's (NBA) Dallas Mavericks. The venue's capacity held accommodations for 17,000 for ice hockey spectators, and 18,190 for basketball spectators.

Reunion was also a performance venue for some of the biggest names in popular music from the 1980s through the late 2000s including Michael Jackson, Paul McCartney, Prince, Van Halen, Bon Jovi, Frank Sinatra, Elton John, David Bowie, Madonna, Dire Straits, Depeche Mode, Gloria Estefan, Phil Collins, Mötley Crüe, Pink Floyd, Queen, Journey, U2, R.E.M. and Radiohead.

Reunion Arena was demolished in November 2009 and the site was cleared by the end of the year. It is now scheduled to become apartments.

== History ==
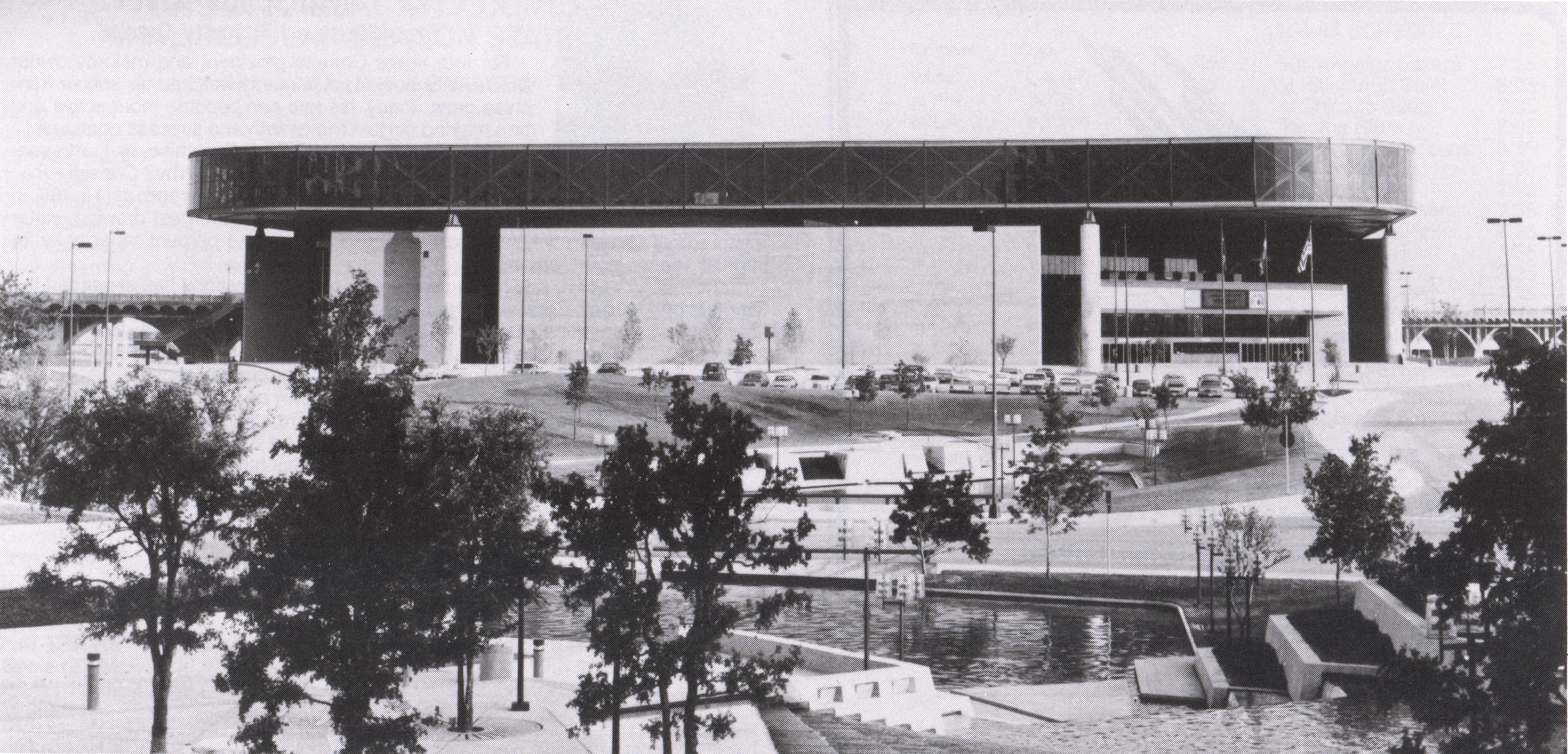
Reunion Arena circa 1984

Reunion Arena was completed in 1980 at a cost of US $27 million. It was named for the early mid-19th century commune, La Reunion. Reunion Arena was notable for two lasts: it was the last NBA or NHL arena to be built without luxury suites, and it was the last NHL arena to still use an American Sign and Indicator scoreboard (though not the last in the NBA—see Charlotte Coliseum). The color matrix messageboards on that scoreboard were replaced in 1991 with Sony Jumbotron video screens.

=== Home teams and sporting events ===
The arena was the home of the Dallas Mavericks from 1980 to 2001 and the Dallas Stars from 1993 to 2001. Both teams moved to the new American Airlines Center in 2001. The Dallas Desperados arena football team used the arena for its 2003 season but ultimately returned to American Airlines Center.

The arena's last remaining full-time sports tenant was the MISL Dallas Sidekicks, but the club was inactive after the fall of 2004.

Reunion Arena also hosted the WCT Tennis Tournament in the 1980s, including Virginia Slims Invitational Tournament. Due to scheduling conflicts in 1984, the WCT Tennis Tournament forced the Dallas Mavericks to play Game 5 of their first playoff series at Moody Coliseum, against the Seattle SuperSonics. While nearby Southern Methodist University competed in the Southwest Conference, Reunion Arena was known by University of Arkansas Razorbacks fans as "Barnhill South", due to the big following by the Arkansas fans away from home; the Barnhill Arena was the home to all UA games until 1993. Reunion Arena hosted the Southwest Conference men's basketball tournament in 1982–1983 and 1985–1996 as well as the 1986 NCAA Final Four.

Reunion was also a venue that was frequently used by World Class Championship Wrestling in the 1980s, in which the organization held its bi-monthly Star Wars events.

Reunion Arena also served as the venue for WWE's December 21, 1999 and November 9, 2000 SmackDown show as well as the Fully Loaded Pay-Per-View event in July of the same year.

=== Notable dignitaries ===
Reunion Arena was long a hot stop for politicians campaigning in Dallas.

President Ronald Reagan spoke at Reunion Arena at a prayer breakfast of an estimated 10,000 people on Aug. 23, 1984, during the Republican National Convention. That night, he accepted the nomination for a second term there.

Reunion Arena was the final campaign stop for Ross Perot, the Dallas billionaire, in his 1992 independent run for president. He drew about 5,000 people.

In 1994, U.S. President Bill Clinton visited the arena to watch the University of Arkansas basketball team play in the NCAA tournament.

President George W. Bush headlined a campaign rally before 13,000 on behalf of Gov. Rick Perry on November 6, 2006.

Barack Obama filled the arena to capacity of 17,000 at a presidential campaign rally on February 20, 2008, with many others turned away by the fire department. It was one of the last events at the venue before it was razed.

=== Early events ===
The arena featured 30,000 ft^{2} (2,790 m^{2}) of floor space and had great sightlines, making it ideal for a number of events and games, including many high school graduations. Although The Who was widely promoted as the first concert at Reunion on July 2, 1980, the first musical act to perform at the venue was actually Parliament-Funkadelic on May 9, 1980. At least five other concerts including Boz Scaggs, the Commodores, The Oak Ridge Boys, Foghat with the Pat Travers Band, and a triple bill of Ted Nugent, Scorpions, and Def Leppard were all booked before the official opening in July.

=== Notable music performances ===
Listed below are artists and bands who performed at Reunion arena. They are divided up by the year they played, starting in the 1980s. The 1990s and 2000s are divided up a bit more by genre.

==== 1980s hitmakers ====
This is a list of artists who constantly produced hits, and were considered stars during the 1980s, and performed at Reunion Arena.

- Hall & Oates
- Elton John
- Fleetwood Mac
- Queen
- Rush
- Bruce Springsteen
- Styx
- The Cars
- Stevie Wonder
- Yes
- ZZ Top
- The Moody Blues
- Tom Petty and the Heartbreakers
- Foreigner
- Pat Benatar
- Billy Squier
- Loverboy
- Journey
- Kenny Rogers
- Stevie Nicks
- Survivor
- Neil Diamond
- Van Halen
- Rod Stewart
- Dan Fogelberg
- The Police
- Asia
- Genesis
- Olivia Newton-John
- REO Speedwagon
- Men at Work
- The Go-Go's
- John Mellencamp
- Heart
- Eddie Money
- Billy Joel
- Sammy Hagar
- Night Ranger
- The Psychedelic Furs
- The Kinks
- Neil Young
- David Bowie
- The Fixx
- Jackson Browne
- Rick Springfield
- Robert Plant
- Joan Jett
- Duran Duran
- Lionel Richie
- The Bangles
- Cyndi Lauper
- Culture Club
- U2
- 'Til Tuesday
- Phil Collins
- Lone Justice
- Dire Straits
- Sting
- Mr. Mister
- Tina Turner
- The Pretenders
- Twisted Sister
- The Pointer Sisters
- Eurythmics
- Bruce Hornsby
- Steve Winwood
- Bon Jovi
- Huey Lewis & The News
- Peter Gabriel
- The Cult
- Billy Idol
- The Cure
- Roger Waters
- Whitney Houston
- Pink Floyd
- Public Image Ltd
- INXS
- R.E.M.
- Madonna
- Michael Jackson
- Prince

A number of acts were so popular they booked (and usually sold out) multiple consecutive dates. Some of the most successful multi-night engagements at Reunion Arena included Stevie Wonder (November 2–3, 1980), AC/DC (February 1–2, 1982 and October 11–12, 1985), Rush (February 28 – March 1, 1983, January 12–13, 1986 and January 19–20, 1988), Bob Seger and the Silver Bullet Band (May 4–5, 1983), Bryan Adams and Journey (June 8–10, 1983; Journey returned December 2–3, 1986), ZZ Top (four-night stints September 28 – October 1, 1983, and August 30 – September 4, 1986; two-night engagements on August 30–31, 1986, April 22–23, 1991 and October 29–30, 1994), The Police with UB40 (November 13–14, 1983), Neil Diamond (December 4–6, 1983, December 6–8, 1984 and June 9–10, 1986), Van Halen (September 10–11, 1981, November 18–19, 1982 and July 14–16, 1984), Prince (December 30, 1984 – January 1, 1985), Genesis (January 18–19, 1987), David Bowie (October 10–11, 1987), Pink Floyd (November 21–23, 1987), Michael Jackson (April 25–27, 1988), Madonna (May 7–8, 1990), Mötley Crüe with Lita Ford and Faster Pussycat (July 30–31, 1990), Depeche Mode with The The (October 13–14, 1993), Garth Brooks (February 13–15, 1998), Backstreet Boys (March 3–4, 2000), Dixie Chicks (August 10–11, 2000), and Paul McCartney (May 9–10, 2002).

==== Hard and classic rock artists ====
Reunion was considered one of the top venues for hard rock and heavy metal artists and in its first five years music videos for Queen's "Another One Bites The Dust", Scorpions' "Still Loving You" and Mötley Crüe's "Home Sweet Home" were all shot in and around the venue.

===== Hard rock =====
- Van Halen
- AC/DC
- Ozzy Osbourne
- Iron Maiden
- Judas Priest
- Aerosmith
- Ratt
- Whitesnake
- Quiet Riot
- Dokken
- Dio
- Kiss
- Queensrÿche
- Cinderella
- Poison
- Megadeth
- Skid Row
- Metallica

===== Classic rock acts =====
Several classic-rock acts played the 18,000-plus seat venue including:

- The Doobie Brothers
- Jethro Tull
- Chuck Berry
- Cheap Trick
- The Beach Boys
- John Denver
- Kansas
- War
- Santana
- Linda Ronstadt
- Eric Clapton
- Bob Seger
- Joni Mitchell
- James Taylor
- Jimmy Page
- Jeff Beck
- Joe Cocker
- Black Sabbath
- David Gilmour
- Bob Dylan
- Grateful Dead
- Lynyrd Skynyrd
- Paul Simon
- Bad Company
- Crosby, Stills, Nash & Young
- Jimmy Buffett
- Joe Walsh

On March 18, 1995, Led Zeppelin principals Robert Plant and Jimmy Page—each of whom had played the venue as headliners and Page with British supergroup The Firm—reunited to play blues covers, songs from their respective solo careers and Zeppelin classics fin the style of their 1994 collaboration No Quarter. The duo returned to Reunion Arena September 27, 1998, in support of their follow-up Walking into Clarksdale.

===== Country artists =====
Country music superstars also dominated the scene at Reunion Arena in the 1980s beginning with a triple bill of Willie Nelson, Ray Price and Lacy J. Dalton on December 30, 1980. Other country artists of note at Reunion Arena included:

- The Gatlin Brothers
- Loretta Lynn
- Alabama
- Dolly Parton
- Barbara Mandrell
- Eddie Rabbitt
- Juice Newton
- George Strait
- Randy Travis
- The Judds
- Hank Williams Jr.
- Tanya Tucker
- Alan Jackson
- Garth Brooks
- Clint Black
- Reba McEntire
- Shania Twain
- Tim McGraw
- Faith Hill

==== Soul, R&B, funk, rap and hip-hop acts ====
Many top names in soul, R&B and funk played at Reunion including Teddy Pendergrass, Commodores, Diana Ross, Rick James, The Temptations, Ray Parker Jr., The Gap Band, Marvin Gaye, Al Jarreau, The Isley Brothers, Ray Charles, Luther Vandross, Earth, Wind & Fire, Gladys Knight & the Pips, and Kool & the Gang. The Jacksons—brothers Michael, Jermaine, Jackie, Marlon, Randy and Tito—performed on July 11, 1981, as part of the Triumph Tour, performing both a Jackson 5 medley as well as covers of Michael's 70s hits including "Off The Wall", "Rock With You", "Don't Stop 'Til You Get Enough", and more. In April 1988, Michael Jackson returned for a three-night engagement in support of his Bad album. Janet Jackson headlined Reunion Arena on July 2, 1990, touring behind her smash album Rhythm Nation 1814. Prince played two New Year's Eve shows at Reunion Arena—on December 31, 1982, with Vanity 6 and The Time, and again on December 30–31, 1984, through January 1, 1985, with Sheila E.

The venue was also host to some of the first large-scale hip-hop and rap concerts in Dallas including Grandmaster Flash and the Furious Five on November 29, 1980, and a triple bill with Run-DMC, Beastie Boys and Timex Social Club on June 15, 1986 (the Run-DMC/Beastie Boys pairing proved successful enough to warrant a return engagement on July 24, 1987). In the 1990s and 2000s hip-hop and rap acts as diverse as MC Hammer, Bobby Brown, Method Man and Redman, DMX, Jay-Z, and Eminem would eventually headline the venue.

==== 1990s and 2000 performances ====
===== 1980s groups in the 1990s =====
Many 1980s stars played Reunion in the early 1990s including:

- Debbie Harry
- Tears for Fears
- Gloria Estefan
- George Michael

===== Pop acts =====
Top 1990s pop acts also played the venue, including Melissa Etheridge, Jewel, Ricky Martin, Backstreet Boys, NSYNC, Third Eye Blind, The Wallflowers, Everclear, No Doubt, Creed, The Black Eyed Peas, and Gwen Stefani.

Although legacy hard rock acts like Aerosmith and Rush continued to be big draws in the 1990s and 2000s the headliners at Reunion Arena were often aggressive radio-rock acts like Primus, Korn, Incubus, Pantera, Rob Zombie, Limp Bizkit, Staind, Bush, Blink-182, Marilyn Manson, Godsmack, Kid Rock, Rammstein, System of a Down, and Tool.

Alternative rock bands including Sonic Youth, Social Distortion, U2, Depeche Mode, Pixies, Morrissey, Radiohead, Garbage, The Smashing Pumpkins, Pearl Jam, Alanis Morissette and PJ Harvey all played Reunion Arena in the 1990s and 2000s.

After the Dallas Stars and Dallas Mavericks moved to American Airlines Center in 2001, that newer and larger venue also began to attract sporting and concert events. In early 2002, Reunion Arena booked engagements including Bob Dylan, NSYNC, Crosby, Stills, Nash & Young, and Paul McCartney. But the venue fell out of favor with music promoters that summer and went more than two years without a major concert event. The Black Eyed Peas and Gwen Stefani played on November 11, 2005, the last major act to perform at Reunion Arena.

The final performance at Reunion Arena was Christian hip hop act Group 1 Crew with Phoenix-based pop-punk group Stellar Kart on June 28, 2008.

=== Live recordings and music videos ===
The music video for Queen's "Another One Bites The Dust" was filmed at Reunion Arena on August 9, 1980.

The video for the Scorpions' "Still Loving You" was filmed at Reunion Arena in 1984.

Mötley Crüe shot the video for "Home Sweet Home" partially at Reunion Arena (exteriors and time lapses) on October 2, 1985. The concert footage was shot two days later at Houston concert venue The Summit.

Judas Priest played June 27, 1986, recording the entire show which parts can be found on the Priest...Live! album. A full concert DVD was released as well. Pink Floyd played three consecutive shows at Reunion in November 1987. Pop singer Whitney Houston played two sold-out concerts at Reunion in September 1987.

Country music superstar Garth Brooks filmed his first television special, This Is Garth Brooks, in the arena on September 20, 1991. The concert became noteworthy after Brooks and guitarist Ty England smashed two guitars on stage.

Country music star Shania Twain filmed her performance for the Come On Over Tour in the arena on September 12, 1998, and later released on her first DVD, Shania Twain Live.

Frank Sinatra played Reunion Arena three times: in 1984, 1987 and 1989. His October 24, 1987, concert was recorded and released in 2018 as part of the Standing Room Only album.

Metallica's February 5, 1989, show at Reunion Arena was broadcast nationally on FM radio and widely bootlegged. An abbreviated version of this recording was eventually released on CD in 2001 as part of the Fan Can 4 box set.

=== Motor racing ===
Dallas Street Circuit
- Location: Dallas, TX, US
- Opened: 19 September 1993; 33 years ago
- Closed: 1 September 1996; 30 years ago
- Major events: IMSA GT Championship (1996); Trans-Am Series (1993–1994, 1996); SCCA Dodge Shelby Pro series (1993)

Street Circuit (1993–1996)
- Length: 2.076 km (1.290 mi)
- Turns: 10
- Race lap record: 0:52.500 ( (Chile) Eliseo Salazar, Ferrari 333 SP, 1996, WSC)

A temporary street circuit at Reunion Arena, known as the Dallas Street Circuit, was set up around the arena, and used some of the surrounding streets. The track was 1.290 mi (2.076 km) in length, had 10 turns, and hosted its first event on September 19, 1993, with the Trans-Am Series visiting the circuit. The track hosted the SCCA Dodge Shelby Pro series in 1993, the Trans-Am Series between 1993 and 1994, and in 1996, and the IMSA GT Championship hosted its sole event at the circuit in 1996.

=== Lap records ===
The fastest official race lap records at the former Dallas Street Circuit (Reunion Arena) are listed as:

Category	Time	Driver	Vehicle	Event
Street Circuit (1993–1996): 1.290 mi (2.076 km)
WSC	0:52.550	(Chile) Eliseo Salazar	Ferrari 333 SP	1996 Grand Prix of Dallas
Trans-Am	0:55.690	(Canada) Ron Fellows	Ford Mustang	1994 Dallas Trans-Am round
GTS-1	0:57.437	(United States) Irv Hoerr	Oldsmobile Aurora	1996 Grand Prix of Dallas

=== Other uses ===
On the morning of September 11, 2001, Reunion Arena was opened to serve as the location for an emergency blood drive. In late 2005, the arena and the Dallas Convention Center were used as the primary Dallas shelters for evacuees of Hurricane Katrina.

=== Closure and demolition ===
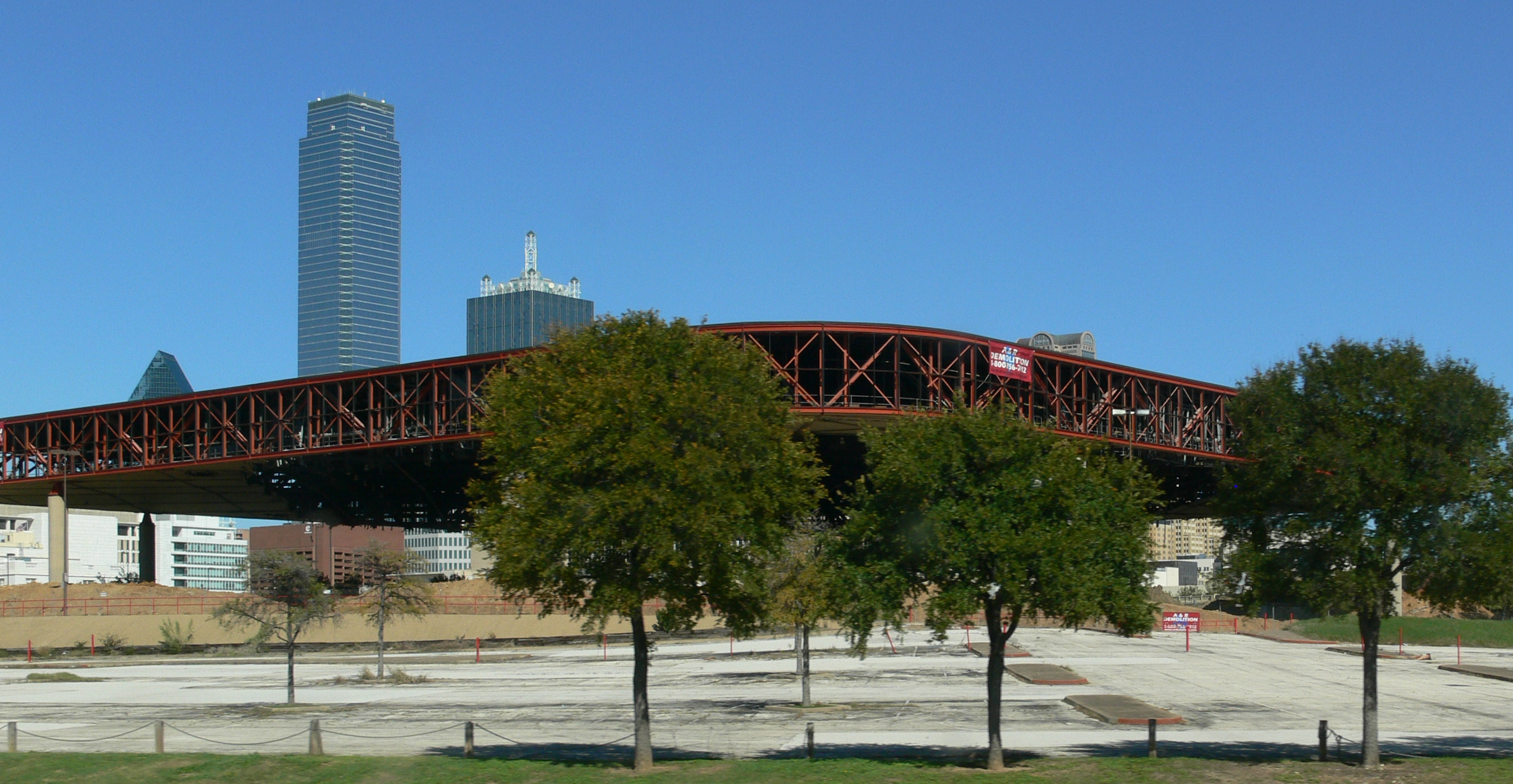
Reunion Arena, October 2009

After a unanimous vote by the Dallas City Council, Reunion Arena officially closed on June 30, 2008. In August 2008, the council said it would implode the arena if it could find an entity willing to foot the bill. The council hoped for the implosion to be part of a movie scene with the film company picking up the tab for the implosion. When no filmmaker seemed interested, the city decided to demolish it using other methods, a process which took several months.

Demolition was officially completed on November 17, 2009, and the site was completely cleared by the end of the year. In 2011, Prince was to perform as part of Super Bowl XLV-related festivities, but the show was canceled due to inclement weather. And in September 2012, Cirque du Soleil's Koozå took place here.

== Former Reunion Arena site today ==
The Reunion Arena site today is now known as Reunion Park with events throughout the year. In 2014, Bruce Springsteen played a concert at the park as the Dallas region played host to March Madness. In 2015, Weezer headlined a concert at the park.

== Notable events ==
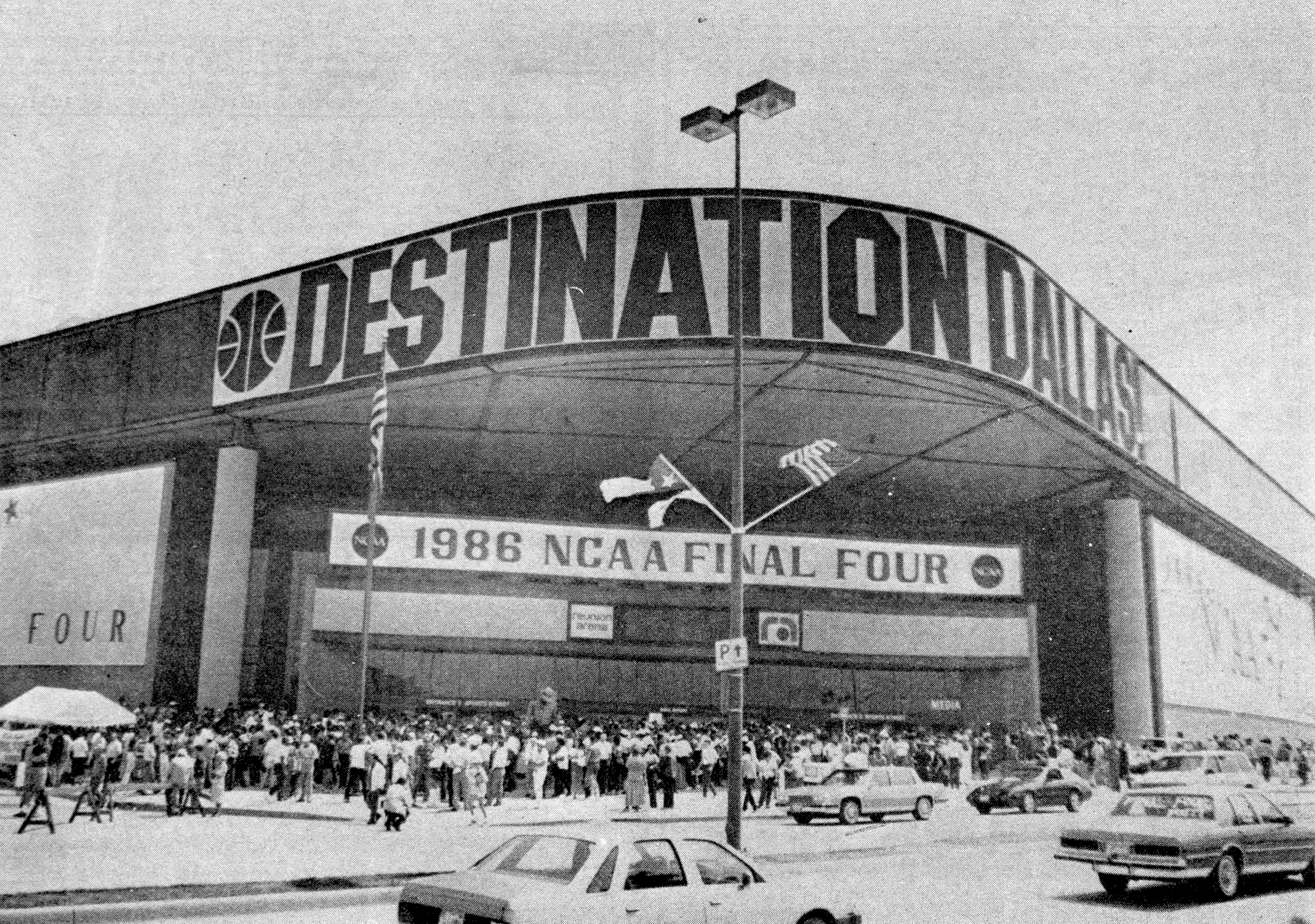
Reunion Arena hosted the 1986 NCAA Final Four.

- 1980: Parliament-Funkadelic played the first concert to be held at the arena.
- 1980: Queen performed during The Game Tour on August 9; the music video for their hit song "Another One Bites the Dust" was recorded at the arena.
- 1982: Ozzy Osbourne performed with guitar virtuoso Randy Rhoads, who was killed in a plane crash less than a month later.
- 1982: On November 25, singer Linda Ronstadt performed her famous Happy Thanksgiving Day concert, one of the first via satellite concerts, by a female solo artist, to be broadcast live on radio stations across the nation.
- 1982: On December 25 at World Class Championship Wrestling (WCCW) Christmas Star Wars, during the cage match between Ric Flair vs. Kerry Von Erich for the NWA World Heavyweight Championship refereed by Michael Hayes, an angle was performed which led to the Von Erich family vs. Fabulous Freebird feud. Astronomical levels of business occurred for the promotion during 1983 and 1984 as a result.
- 1983: The first wrestling sellout, of more than 17,000, was on June 17, headlined by Harley Race vs. Kevin Von Erich for the NWA World Heavyweight Championship, and Bruiser Brody and Kerry Von Erich vs. Michael Hayes and Terry Gordy (two-thirds of the Fabulous Freebirds).
- 1983: On November 13 and 14, The Police played two sold-out concerts as part of their Synchronicity Tour.
- 1984: Black Sabbath played there on their completely sold-out Born Again Tour, with Deep Purple's Ian Gillan on vocals.
- 1984: Scorpions filmed their video for "Still Loving You".
- 1985: Phil Collins performed here during the No Jacket Required Tour. The show was filmed for a video release called "No Ticket Required".
- 1985: Mötley Crüe's Theatre of Pain Tour stopped here; they filmed their video for "Home Sweet Home".
- 1986: NCAA men's basketball Final Four and NBA All-Star Game
- 1986–1987: George Strait performed and recorded George Strait Live on New Year's Eve
- 1987: Frank Sinatra performed and recorded a show on October 24, featured in his 2018 posthumous live compilation album, Standing Room Only.
- 1988: Michael Jackson performed three consecutive sold–out shows at Reunion Arena, during his Bad World Tour on April 25–27, 1988.
- 1988: Prince performed a sold-out show during his Lovesexy Tour on November 29, 1988.
- 1989: 1989 MISL All-Star Game
- 1990: Madonna performed two sold-out shows from her Blond Ambition Tour on May 7 and 8.
- 1991: Garth Brooks taped his first television special, This Is Garth Brooks!, during a sold-out concert in September. The special airs on NBC in early 1992. It was released on VHS on June 16, 1992, and it waslater included as part of the November 2006 DVD release, Garth Brooks – The Entertainer. The concert was notable for Brooks and Ty England smashing two acoustic guitars together.
- 1993: The first Dallas Stars hockey game was played against the Detroit Red Wings on October 5. The Stars defeated the Red Wings 6–4.
- 1998: Shania Twain taped her television special Shania Twain Live, on September 12, which was aired exclusively on DirecTV for free. The special was later released on DVD in November 1999. Three of her music videos were also taken from this performance.
- 1999: Games 1, 2, and 5 of the 1999 Stanley Cup Finals were played between the Stars and Buffalo Sabres. The Stars won the cup in Game 6 over the Sabres 2–1 in the third overtime period at Buffalo's HSBC Arena.
  - Barney the Purple Dinosaur's 4th live stage show & second tour Barney's Musical Castle began performing.
- 2000: Games 3, 4, and 6 of the 2000 Stanley Cup Finals were played between the Stars and New Jersey Devils. However, the Devils won the Stanley Cup, defeating the Stars in Game 6, 2–1 in the second overtime period.
- 2000: WWF Fully Loaded.
- 2003: Big 12 Conference women's post-season basketball tournament
- 2003: NCAA Women's Volleyball Division I Final Four
- 2004: Big 12 Conference women's post-season basketball tournament
- 2006: Big 12 Conference women's post-season basketball tournament
- 2007: NCAA women's basketball tournament regional
- 2008: Barack Obama filled the venue for a campaign rally. Following this, Reunion Arena closes.
- 2009: Reunion Arena is demolished.

== See also ==
- List of tallest buildings in Dallas

Preceded by –	Home of the Dallas Mavericks; 1980–2001	Succeeded by American Airlines Center
Preceded by Met Center	Home of the Dallas Stars; 1993–2001	Succeeded by American Airlines Center
Preceded by American Airlines Center	Home of the Dallas Desperados; 2003	Succeeded by American Airlines Center
Preceded by Rupp Arena	NCAA Men's Division I Basketball Tournament; Finals Venue; 1986	Succeeded by Louisiana Superdome
Preceded by Hoosier Dome	Host of the NBA All-Star Game; 1986	Succeeded by Kingdome
Preceded by –	Home of the Dallas Stallions (RHI); 1999	Succeeded by none
Preceded by Cotton Bowl	Home of the Dallas Tornado; 1980–1981	Succeeded by none
Preceded by –	Home of the Dallas Sidekicks; 1984–2004	Succeeded by none
Preceded by –	Home of the Dallas Texans; 1990–1993	Succeeded by none
