= Carroll Shelby =

American racing driver and automotive designer (1923–2012)

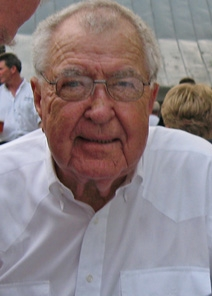
- Shelby in 2007
- Born: Carroll Hall Shelby; January 11, 1923; Leesburg, Texas, U.S.
- Died: May 10, 2012 (aged 89); Dallas, Texas, U.S.

Formula One World Championship career
- Nationality: (United States) American
- Active years: 1958–1959
- Team(s): Aston Martin, non-works Maserati
- Entries: 8
- Championships: 0
- Wins: 0
- Podiums: 0
- Career points: 0
- Pole positions: 0
- Fastest laps: 0
- First entry: 1958 French Grand Prix
- Last entry: 1959 Italian Grand Prix

24 Hours of Le Mans career
- Years: 1958–1959
- Teams: David Brown Racing Dept
- Best finish: 1st (1959)
- Class wins: 1

Carroll Hall Shelby (January 11, 1923 – May 10, 2012) was an American automotive designer, racing driver, and entrepreneur.

Shelby was involved with the AC Cobra and Mustang for the Ford Motor Company. With driver Ken Miles, he developed the Ford GT40, the car that won the 24 Hours of Le Mans in 1966, 1967, 1968, and 1969. As of 2026, it remains the only American-built car to win at Le Mans. Their efforts were dramatized in the 2019 Oscar-winning film Ford v Ferrari (titled Le Mans '66 in some European countries).

Shelby and co-driver Roy Salvadori won the 1959 24 Hours of Le Mans driving an Aston Martin DBR1. He won the 1960 Sports Car Club of America United States Auto Club Road Racing Sports Car Championship by winning the round-one race at Riverside International Raceway in a Maserati Tipo 61 "Birdcage" and winning round two at Continental Divide Raceways in a Chevrolet Scarab Mark II.

In 1962, Shelby established Shelby American to manufacture and market performance vehicles. His autobiography, The Carroll Shelby Story, was published in 1967.

== Early life and career ==
Carroll Hall Shelby was born on January 11, 1923, to Warren Hall Shelby, a rural mail carrier, and his wife, Eloise Shelby (born Lawrence), in Leesburg, Texas. The younger Shelby suffered from heart valve leakage problems by the age of seven and related complications throughout his life. From a young age, Shelby was fascinated with speed, which led to an interest in cars and airplanes. He moved to Dallas, Texas at the age of seven with his family, and around age ten, he rode his bicycle to nearby dirt tracks to watch races. At the age of 15, he was driving and taking care of his father's Ford. Shelby honed his driving skills with his Willys automobile while attending Woodrow Wilson High School in Dallas, Texas. He graduated in 1940.

Shelby enrolled at The Georgia Institute of Technology in the Aeronautical Engineering program.

Shelby enlisted in the United States Army Air Corps on April 11, 1941, eight months before the attack on Pearl Harbor. He began pilot training that November at Randolph Air Force Base, Texas. He graduated with the rank of staff sergeant pilot in September 1942 at Ellington Field. After more training, he was commissioned as a second lieutenant in December 1942.

Shelby served as a flight instructor and test pilot in the Beechcraft AT-11 Kansan and Curtiss-Wright AT-9 Jeep. He was posted to several other air bases in Texas, including Kelly Field, Cuero Field, Perrin Army Air Field, Ellington Field, and Childress Army Airfield. He trained bombardiers and navigators. He went on to fly the Douglas B-18 Bolo, the North American B-25 Mitchell, the Douglas A-26 Invader, and finally the Boeing B-29 Superfortress at Denver, Colorado.

Shelby was then discharged after V-J Day. Afterwards, Shelby started a dump truck business, worked as an oil-well roughneck from 1948 to 1949, then started a poultry farm but went bankrupt in 1952.

== Driving career ==
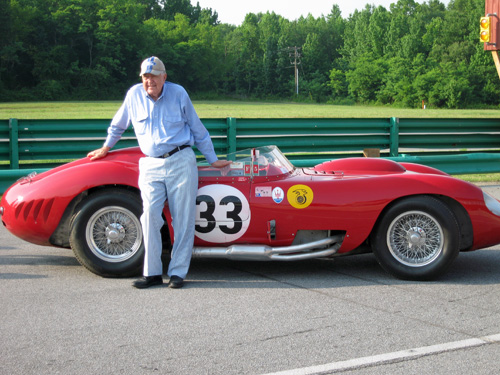
Shelby beside his 1957 Maserati 450S at Virginia International Raceway in 2007

Shelby began his racing career as an amateur. In May 1952, Shelby raced his friend Ed Wilkin's MG TC at the Norman Grand Prix in Norman, Oklahoma. At this race is where he first used the 98 racing number he carried for the remainder of his career in motorsports. Later in the year, he raced Charles Brown's Cadillac-Allards at Caddo Mills, Texas. At the end of 1952, Shelby won four races, taking home only trophies and accepting no prize money.

In 1953, Shelby raced Brown's Cad-Allard, then Roy Cherryhomes' Cad-Allard, winning eight or nine races.

The following year, Shelby drove in the Mil Kilometros de la Ciudad de Buenos Aires, sponsored by the Automobile Club of Argentina and the Sports Car Club of America. There he met John Wyer, Aston Martin's team manager, who asked Shelby to drive their DBR3 at Sebring. During the race, the DBR3 broke an axle and did not finish.

In April 1954, Shelby traveled to Europe, where he raced a DBR3 for Aston Martin at Aintree, then at Le Mans. He and Graham Whitehead took fifth place in an Aston Martin at the 1,000 km at Monza on 27 June. He then drove in the three-car factory team effort at Silverstone on 17 July with Peter Collins and Roy Salvadori; they took the three top places.

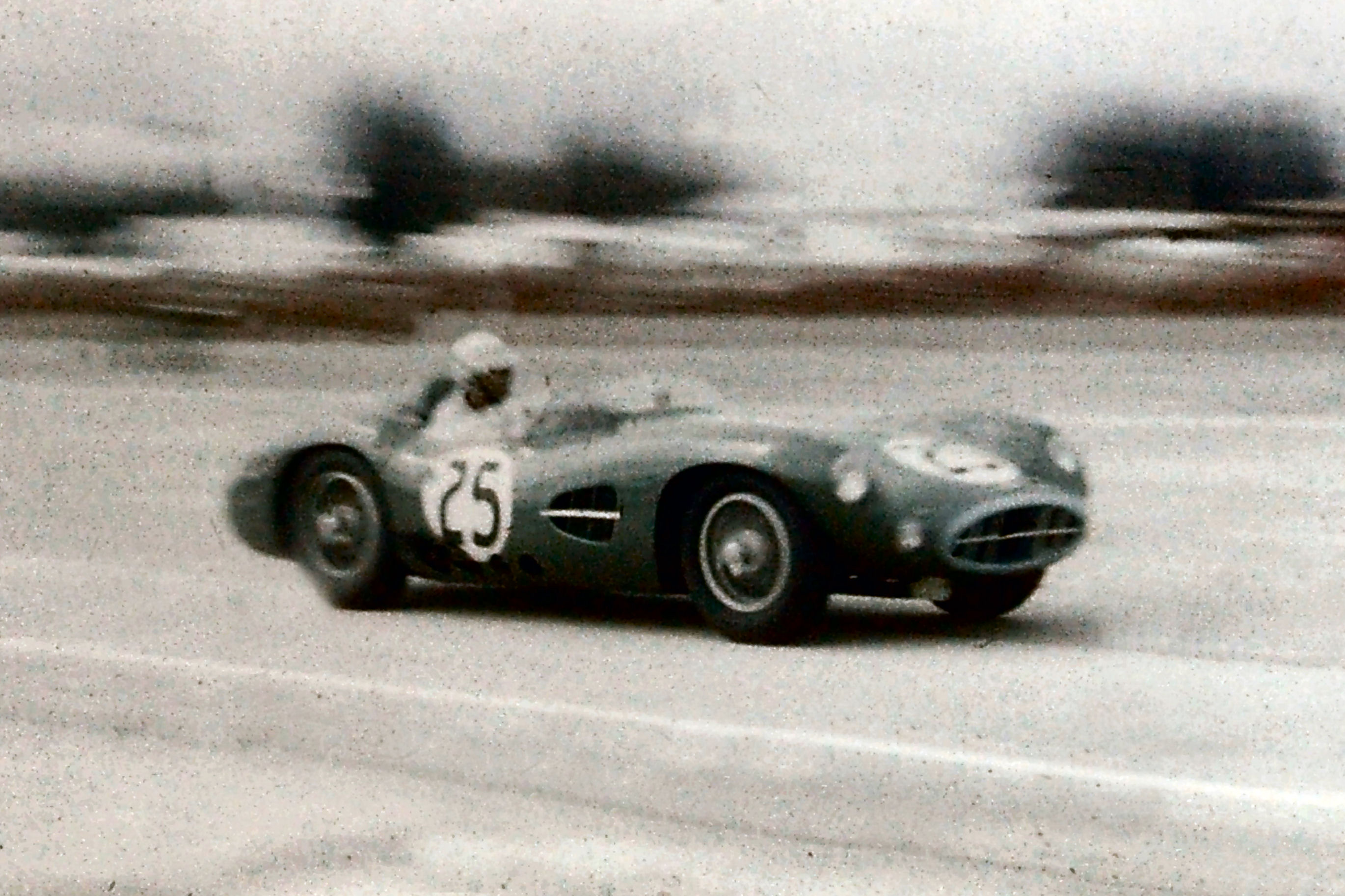
Shelby racing an Aston Martin DBR1/300 at the 12 Hours of Sebring in 1958

In August, Shelby drove with Donald Healey and his team. In an Austin-Healey 100S and supercharged 100S, they set Class D National speed records at the Bonneville Salt Flats. Shelby, Healey, Captain G.E.T. Eyston, Mortimer Morris Goodall, and Roy Jackson-Moore set about 70 records, with Shelby setting 17 on his own. Shelby was severely injured in a crash while racing an Austin-Healey in the Carrera Panamericana.

Amid eight months of operations, Shelby continued to drive in 1955, winning about ten races and mounting a second-place showing at Sebring driving Allen Guiberson's Ferrari Monza. He started driving Tony Paravano's Ferraris in August.

In 1956, Shelby won 30 more races with the Ferrari, started driving for John Edgar, and opened Carroll Shelby Sports Cars in Dallas. He drove in the Mount Washington Hillclimb Auto Race in a specially prepared Ferrari 375 GP roadster, to a record run of 10 minutes, 21.8 seconds. He also set records at Giants Despair Hillclimb, and raced at Brynfan Tyddyn. He was Sports Illustrated magazine's driver of the year in 1956.

In September 1957, Shelby raced John Edgar's 4.5-liter Maserati at the Riverside International Raceway, where he was involved in a crash that caused injuries requiring 72 stitches and plastic surgery for broken bones in his nose and cheekbones. He returned in November, winning with the same car at the same course, against Masten Gregory and Dan Gurney. He repeated as Sports Illustrated driver of the year.

On 18 May 1958, Shelby joined John Wyer and the Aston Martin team in Europe and drove a DBR3 at the Belgian Sports Car Grand Prix. He then drove a DBR1 at the Nürburgring 1000 km with co-driver Salvadori. Shelby was teamed up with Salvadori at Le Mans, but Shelby came down with dysentery and was replaced by Stuart Lewis-Evans a few hours into the race. Shelby then drove a Maserati 250F for Mimo Dei's Scuderia Centro Sud in 3 Grand Prix races to gain Formula 1 and open-wheel car experience, including the Portuguese Grand Prix. Shelby finished the year driving John Edgar's 4.5L Maserati in the Tourist Trophy at Nassau.

Shelby and Salvadori started the 1959 sports car season by driving the DBR1/300 at Sebring in March. In June, Shelby drove Wolfgang Seidel's Porsche in the Nürburgring 1000 km. The highlight of his racing career came in June 1959 when he co-drove an Aston Martin DBR1 (with Englishman Roy Salvadori) to victory in the 1959 24 Hours of Le Mans. In September, Shelby drove with Jack Fairman in the Goodwood Tourist Trophy.

The 1959 Grand Prix season saw Shelby driving the Aston Martin DBR4 in the Dutch Grand Prix in May, followed by the British Grand Prix at Aintree in July. Shelby then drove in the Portuguese Grand Prix in August, followed by the Italian Grand Prix in September.

Shelby finished the 1959 racing season driving Casner Motor Racing Division's Birdcage Maserati at the Nassau races in December. In January 1960, he drove Temple Buell's Maserati 250F in the New Zealand Grand Prix, then Camoradi's Porsche in the Cuban Gran Premio Libertad, then their 2.9-liter Birdcage Maserati at Sebring. He won the Grand Prix at Riverside driving one of "Lucky" Cassner's Birdcage Maseratis, and then won the Castle Rock race in June, driving a Scarab. He finished the year driving Max Balchowsky's "Old Yeller II" in the Road America, then a Birdcage Maserati in the Pacific Grand Prix and the Los Angeles Times Grand Prix, which was his last race.

Shelby later wrote that "winning the Twenty-four Hours was probably the greatest thrill I ever got out of racing. I can think of plenty of other races that carry their quota of thrills for the winner, but when you win this one, it kind of gives you license to go out and tell people you're good, and that often helps get some other deals together."

== As constructor ==
One year after retiring from driving in October 1960 for health reasons, Shelby opened a high-performance driving school with Pete Brock: the Shelby School of High Performance Driving at the Riverside track.

Shelby also opened the Shelby-American performance equipment and customization company in the Los Angeles area. Shelby's visits to European limited-production car factories led him to believe that “America was missing a big bet, a winning bet": "the design and production of an all-purpose, all-American sports or grand touring car that you could drive to market and also race during the weekend..." Shelby's starting point was putting a 300-brake horsepower V8 on an Austin Healey-type chassis, so that the combination weighed less than 2,600 pounds (1,180 kg).

Shelby became interested in the potential of the AC Ace chassis, especially after Bristol Aeroplane Company stopped building automobile engines, and the sales with the Ford Zephyr engine were declining in September 1961. Shelby contacted Charles Hurlock of AC, who agreed to provide the chassis on credit. Dave Evans of Ford Motor Company agreed to provide 221-cubic-inch (3.6-litre) and 260-cubic-inch (4.3-litre) V8 engines with transmissions also on credit. The new car, called the Carroll Shelby Experimental or CSX0001, was marketed as the Shelby AC Cobra, then AC Cobra, and eventually, the Ford Cobra. Production began in March 1962, with 75 cars sold by the end of the year. One hundred cars had been built by April 1963, the first 75 with the 260-cubic-inch engine, followed by a 289-cubic-inch (4.7-litre) engine. The 427 Cobra prototype was built in October 1964.

Shelby started racing his creation in October 1962 at Riverside, with Billy Krause driving the CSX0002. Racing experience from 1963 indicated that further modifications were necessary to make the Cobra competitive with the Ferrari GT cars; in particular, the AC roadster body needed to be replaced with a lower-drag enclosed coupe body for high-speed circuits. The result was the Shelby Daytona Coupe, which took three GT class wins on the 1964 World Sportscar Championship GT circuit, including Le Mans and the Tourist Trophy at Goodwood, plus the Sports Car Club of America's U.S. GT Championship. Then in 1965, Shelby American Cobra won the International Championship for GT Manufacturers.

After success with the Daytona Coupe in 1964, Shelby-American became more heavily involved in Ford's GT40 Sports Prototype racing program, which had experienced disappointing results. Shelby made changes to running gear, particularly transmissions, to improve reliability, and designed their GT40 Mark II variant around Ford's 7.0-litre (427 cu in) engine. In 1966, the Mark II earned Ford the overall Constructors' title in the World Sportscar Championship with their 1-2-3 finish at Le Mans. Ford was also developing a radical new prototype with a lightweight chassis based on aluminum honeycomb panels. Shelby was brought in to finalize the development of the car after the project experienced setbacks in 1966, which included the death of driver Ken Miles in August. The Mark IV was introduced for the 1967 12 Hours of Sebring and finished in first place. It was prepared for Le Mans and another record-breaking finish. Driver Dan Gurney shook and sprayed champagne on the podium and started a tradition. The Mark IV was Shelby's last prototype racer, as new limits on engine displacement for that class eliminated Ford's engines.

Shelby's early racing successes led to a joint effort of Ford and Shelby-American to produce the Mustang-based Shelby GT350, starting in 1965, then the Shelby GT500, starting in 1967. Shelby produced those cars through 1968, then subsequent cars with the Shelby GT brand were produced in-house by Ford.

After parting with Ford, Shelby moved on to help develop performance cars with divisions of the two other Big 3 American companies: Dodge (Chrysler) and Oldsmobile (General Motors).

In the intervening years, Shelby had a series of ventures start and stop relating to the production of "completion" Cobras — cars that were allegedly built using "leftover" parts and frames. In the 1960s, the FIA required entrants (Shelby, Ford, Ferrari, etc.) to produce at least 100 cars for homologated classes of racing. Shelby simply ordered an insufficient number of cars and skipped a large block of Vehicle Identification Numbers, to create the illusion the company had imported large numbers of cars. Decades later in the 1990s, Carroll alleged that he had found the "leftover" frames, and began selling cars that were supposedly finally "completed". After it was discovered the cars were built from scratch in collaboration with McCluskey, Ltd., they were re-termed "continuation" Cobras. The cars are still built to this day, known as the current CSX4000 series of Cobras.

Shelby was inducted into the International Motorsports Hall of Fame in 1991, the Motorsports Hall of Fame of America in 1992, the Automotive Hall of Fame in 1992, and the Diecast Hall of Fame in 2009. He was also inducted into the SCCA Hall of Fame on March 2, 2013.

In 2003, Ford Motor Co. and Carroll Shelby resumed ties and he became technical advisor to the Ford GT project. In that same year, he formed Carroll Shelby International, Inc., based in Nevada.

== Partnership with Dodge ==
Shelby began working with Dodge at the request of Chrysler Corporation chairman Lee Iacocca. Iacocca had previously been responsible for bringing Shelby to the Ford Mustang. After almost a decade of tuning work, Shelby was brought on board as the "Performance Consultant" on the Dodge Viper Technical Policy Committee made up of Chrysler's executive Bob Lutz, Product Design chief Tom Gale, and Engineering Vice President François Castaing. Shelby's wealth of experience helped make the Viper as light and powerful as possible.

The following cars were modified by Shelby and bore his name, but sold under the Dodge marque:

- 1983–1984 Dodge Shelby Charger
- 1985–1987 Dodge Charger Shelby
- 1984–1986 Dodge Omni GLH
- 1996 Dodge Viper RT/10 CS (50 units approved for production however only 19 were actually built: 18 1995/1996 RTs were built (16 white with blue stripes, 1 blue white stripes, 1 black with gold emblem on the hood and one 1997 GTS Shelby S/C (Street Competition) which was red with gold stripes.)

The following cars used Shelby-modified parts, but were not overseen by Carroll Shelby:

- 1986 Dodge Daytona Turbo Z C/S
- 1987–1988 Dodge Daytona Shelby Z
- 1988–1991 Dodge Daytona C/S
- 1989–1991 Dodge Daytona Shelby
- 1988–1989 Dodge Lancer Shelby
- 1989–1990 Dodge Shadow Competition
- 1991–1992 Dodge Spirit R/T
- 1992–1993 Dodge Daytona IROC R/T
- 1999–2000 Dodge Durango S.P. 360

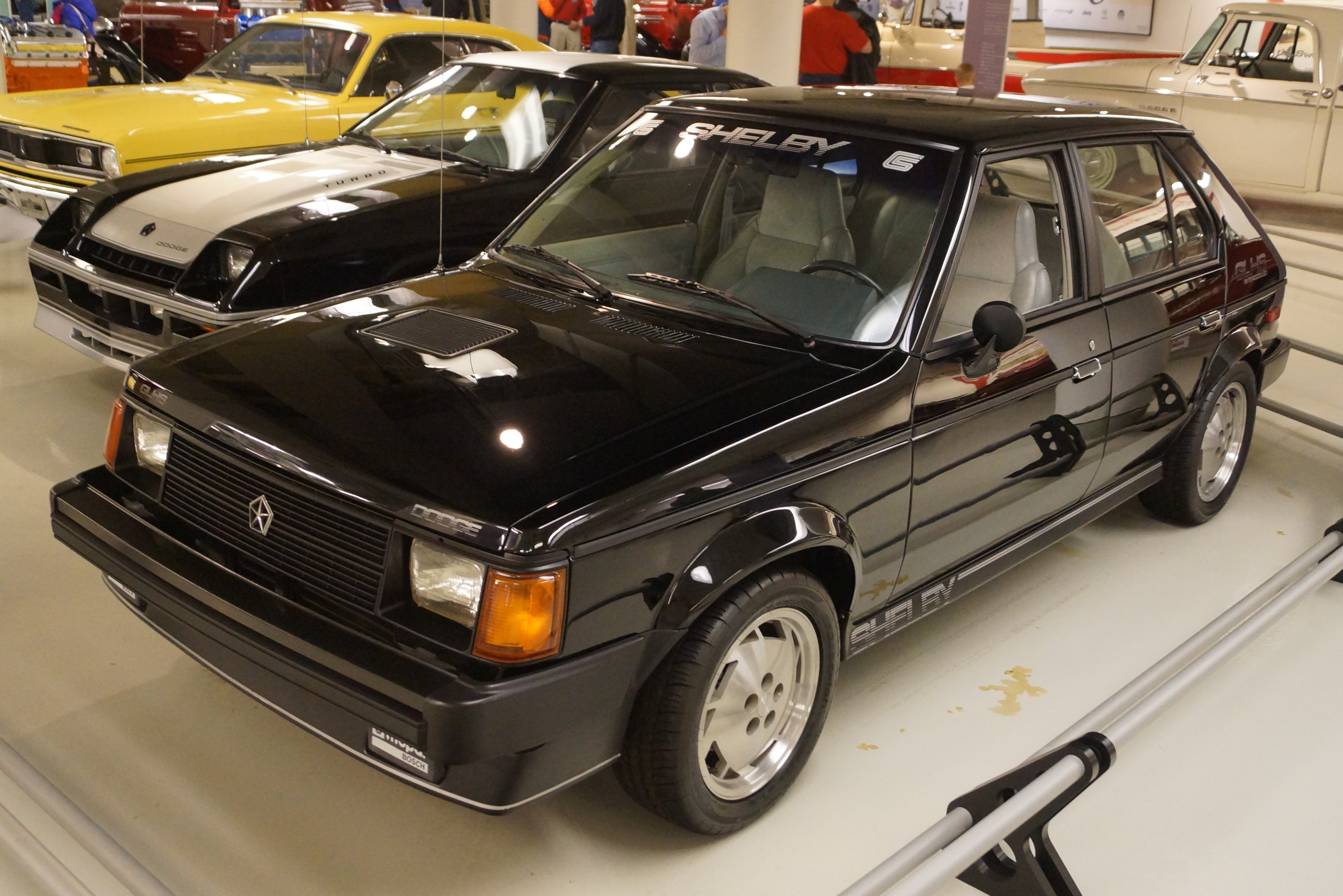
1986 Shelby GLH-S on display at the Walter P. Chrysler Museum

The following cars were limited production vehicles and modified at Shelby's Whittier, California, plant, and then sold as Shelbys:

- 1986 Shelby GLH-S (based on the Dodge Omni GLH) (500 produced)
- 1987 Shelby GLH-S (based on the Dodge Charger Shelby) (1,000 produced)
- 1987 Shelby Lancer (based on the Dodge Lancer) (800 produced, 400 with a Leather Interior/Automatic Trans. and 400 with a Cloth Interior/5 spd. Trans.)
- 1987 Shelby CSX (based on the Dodge Shadow) (750 produced)
- 1988 Shelby CSX-T (based on the Dodge Shadow) (1,000 produced)
- 1989 Shelby Dakota (based on the Dodge Dakota) (1,500 produced)
- 1989 Shelby CSX-VNT (based on the Dodge Shadow) (500 produced)

Above information citation

== Shelby Series 1 ==
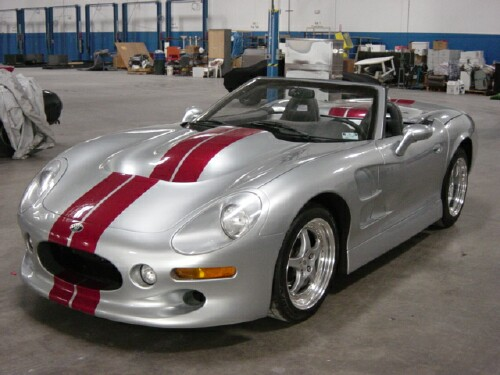
Shelby Series 1

Shelby unveiled the Series 1 roadster at the 1997 Los Angeles Auto Show, with the intention for it to be a modern day reinterpretation of the original Shelby AC Cobra. The Series 1 used Oldsmobile's 4.0 L L47 Aurora V8, which was chosen because it was the selected engine by Indy for that year but was poorly supported by the ailing GM division. Shelby had already built an Aurora-engined sports prototype together with Racefab in 1997, in an attempt to continue his single-make Can-Am series.

The Series 1 is the only car ever produced by Carroll Shelby from a clean sheet of paper, and built from the ground up. All other Shelbys were re-engineered models produced by other manufacturers and then modified by Shelby.

Before manufacturing the Series 1, substantial expenses were accrued for the purpose of conducting tests and obtaining certification in order to comply with the 1999 Federal Motor Vehicle Safety Standards. Shelby American built a total of 249 production Series 1 cars as model year 1999 cars.

During production, Venture Corporation purchased Shelby American, Inc. The purchase included the Series 1 model, but not the rights to produce the "Continuation Series" Shelby Cobras. In 2004, after a subsequent bankruptcy by Venture Corporation (unrelated to the acquisition of Shelby American), Carroll Shelby's new company, Shelby Automobiles, Inc., purchased the Series 1 assets for pennies on the dollar. Included in the asset purchase were enough components to produce several more complete Series 1s.

Because the 1999 Federal Motor Vehicle Safety Standards certificate had expired, and the cost to re-certify the car was prohibitive, all Series 1's produced after that date were completed as "component cars" and delivered with no engine or transmission. Those "component car" models built in 2005 are identified with a seven-digit vehicle identification number (VIN) and were designated with a CSX5000 series serial number. The original 249 were production cars with a seventeen-digit VIN.

The Series 1 was produced in both supercharged and normally aspirated versions. Supercharged cars were also outfitted by the factory with larger brakes and a heavy-duty clutch. Performance is near "supercar" category with a 0 to 60 mph time at 4.1 seconds for the supercharged version. The Series 1 had power steering, power disc brakes, factory air conditioning, power windows, and an AM/FM/CD audio system. The convertible top folded away in a compartment located behind the cockpit. Some component cars were sold as roadsters, with no convertible top.

== Ford-Shelby projects ==
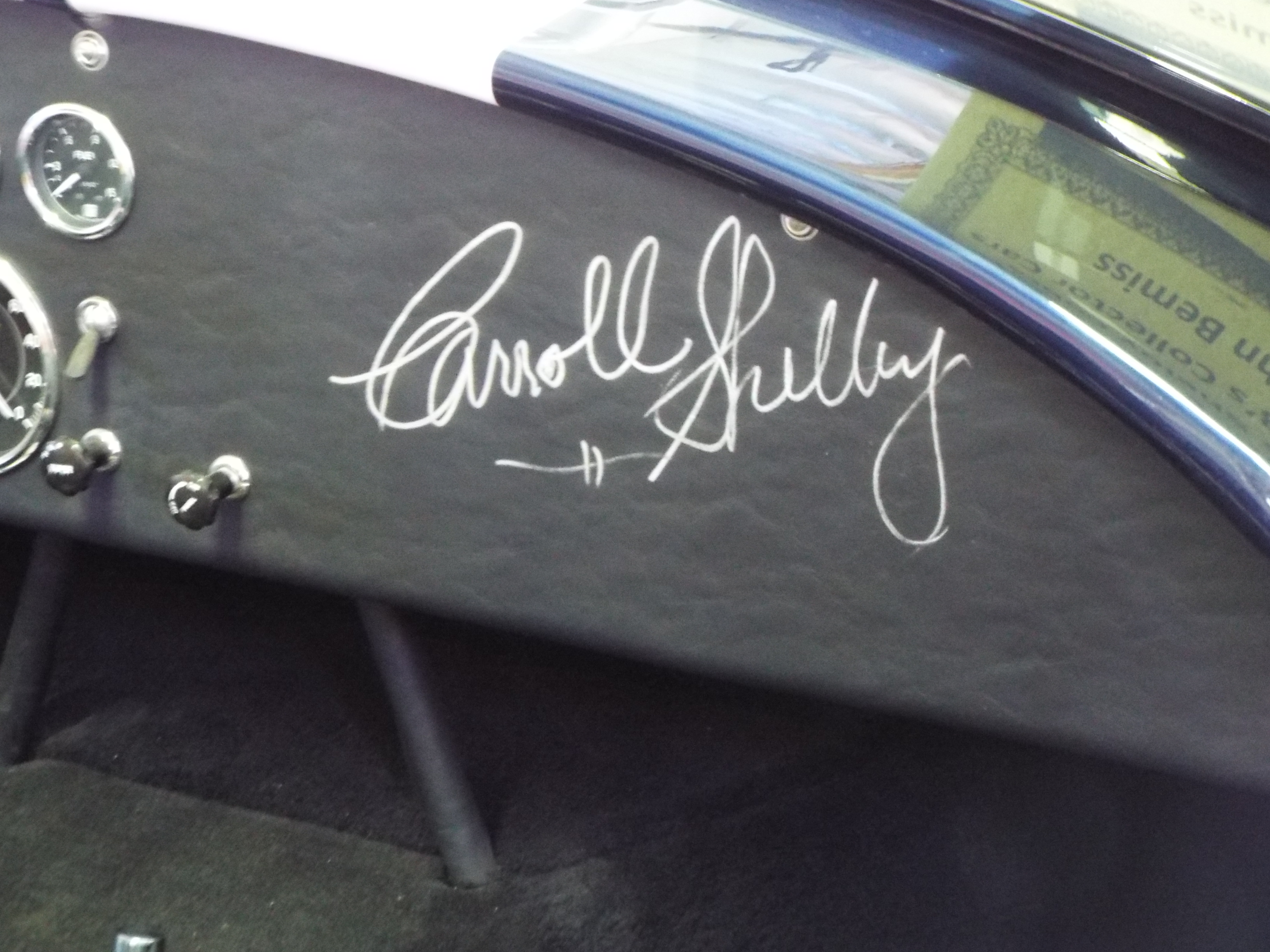
1965 Shelby Cobra dashboard autographed by Carroll Shelby on display in the Martin Auto Museum

In 2004, a new Ford Shelby Cobra Concept was shown off at U.S. car shows. Built with a retro body mimicking the 1960s Cobras mixed with modern touches, it was based on the Ford GT chassis (reworked for front engine/rear wheel drive) and powered by a 6.4 L V10 engine that produced 605 hp (451 kW). It received overwhelmingly positive press reviews and won the "Best In Show" award at the Detroit International Auto Show.

A coupe version of the Shelby Cobra roadster was introduced the following year in 2005, the Ford Shelby GR-1 concept car. While sporting a completely modern design, it took inspiration from the design of the 1960s Shelby Daytona. The GR-1, like the Cobra, is based on the GT's chassis. Press reviews for the GR-1 were positive. The car was featured on the cover of Motor Trend and Car Magazine. The Ford Shelby GR-1 was floated as a possibility of taking over the Ford GT's production line after its production came to an end. Neither Shelby concept was built.

In 2005, Shelby built his very first modern Masterpiece CSM:00001 V6 Shelby Mustang CS6 and #01 V8 to prove to Ford that he could still build high-performance cars. Its V6 produced 380 hp, making it faster than Ford's 300 hp V8. Because Ford thought the CS6 would hurt Ford Mustang V8 sales, Ford told Shelby to go with the 500 hp V8 instead. Shelby first built a V8 modern version look of the Eleanor. Carroll built only one at the Shelby Factory. Later WCC built 4 as kits. Few CS6 Shelbys were also built as kits; consequently, these are among the rarest Shelbys in the world.

At the 2005 New York International Auto Show, Ford introduced the Shelby GT500, the first official collaboration between Shelby and Ford on a Mustang since 1971. It became available in the summer of 2006 as part of the model year 2007 lineup. It was powered by a supercharged and intercooled Modular 5.4L V8 engine, with four-valves-per-cylinder heads borrowed from the Ford GT, an Eaton M122 Roots-type supercharger and a power output rated by Ford at 500 hp (507 PS; 373 kW) and 480 lb⋅ft (651 N⋅m) of torque. It had a Tremec T-6060 6-speed manual transmission, reworked suspension geometry, 18-inch wheels, functional aerodynamic body kit, and a retro solid rear axle. The GT500 started at an MSRP of $40,930 for the coupe, and $45,755 for the convertible. Although Carroll Shelby had no hands-on involvement in the design of the car, he provided Ford and SVT (Special Vehicle Team) input on what would make the car better and convinced Ford to use wider rear tires (from 255 mm wide to 285 mm wide).

Shelby, in cooperation with the Hertz Corporation, produced 500 cars named "Shelby GT-H" in 2006, designed after the Shelby G.T.350H "Rent-a-Racer" from 1966 under a similar partnership. This was a special-edition Ford Mustang GT, available for rental from Hertz. A Ford Racing Performance Group FR1 Power Pack increased the GT's 4.6 L V8 engine to 325 hp (242 kW). The cars included a custom Shelby hood and black and gold body styling, incorporating a gold-plated "Hertz" nameplate on both sides.

A consumer version of the Shelby GT-H was available from Shelby through Ford dealers, called the Shelby GT. There were 5,682 vehicles for 2007 and 2,300 for 2008 were built. They had the same engine as the GT-H, but more suspension, appearance, and drivetrain upgrades and were available with either manual or automatic transmission. White and black colors were available for 2007 models and grabber orange or vista blue were available for 2008. A convertible was available in 2008 also. An available upgrade from the Shelby factory in Las Vegas were a few different superchargers. It then was called a Shelby GT/SC. All Shelby GTs are shipped with the Shelby serial number (CSM) on the dashboard badge and in the engine compartment, such as 07SGT0001 or 08SGT0001.

Both Ford and Shelby American continue to use the Shelby name on high performance variants of the Mustang.

== Non-Ford projects ==
In 1963 the Rootes Group, manufacturer of Sunbeam automobiles, wanted Shelby to upgrade their Alpine sports car to a more powerful version, using the Ford small-block V-8 engine, as he had done with the AC Cobra. Shelby did so and Rootes, pleased with the results, named the upgraded model the Tiger. In 1967 Chrysler bought Sunbeam and decided to use their own small-block engine in the vehicle. However, their engine would not fit and marketed the cars with Ford engines until the supply ran out and the model was discontinued.

In his later years, Shelby brought several lawsuits against companies that were making copies of the Cobra body for use on kit cars – ostensibly for copyright, trademark, and patent violations. Despite the litigation, the Cobra kit car industry continues to thrive.

Shelby American sued Superformance for producing its Superformance Brock Coupe, a copy of the original Shelby Daytona Coupe—both designed by Shelby's racing-school partner Pete Brock. The terms of the settlement have never been released to the public, but the product is now known as the Shelby Daytona Coupe. Nearly 150 had been built as of February 2007.

In 2002, Unique Performance, a company of Farmers Branch, Texas, purchased a license from Carroll Shelby Enterprises to place his name on a series of continuation vintage vehicles. This company specialized in recreating 1960s-style Shelby Mustangs. They purchased used Mustangs and installed updated versions of the Shelby 325-horsepower 302-cubic-inch V8 engine. They also use modern five-speed manual transmissions, brakes, steering, suspension, interiors, and entertainment systems. Because Shelby's license was purchased, these cars have Shelby serial numbers.

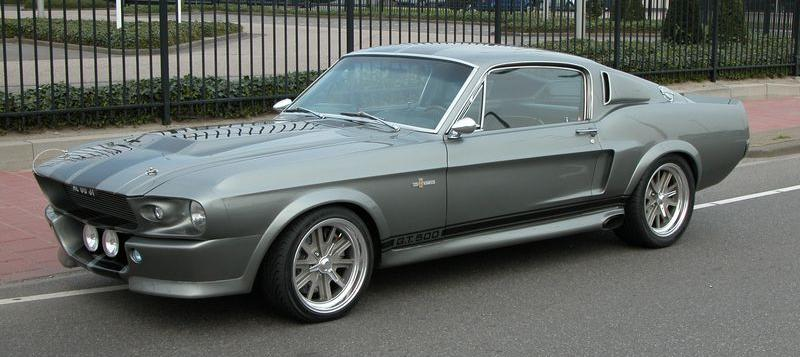
1967 custom Fastback Mustang Eleanor from the 2000 film Gone in Sixty Seconds

In October 2007, Shelby ended his licensing agreement with Unique Performance after customers complained that vehicles had not been delivered. Unique Performance was subsequently raided by law enforcement for VIN irregularities and declared bankruptcy, which effectively ended the Shelby continuation "Eleanor" Mustang production. Shelby was in turn sued by victims of Unique Performance for his involvement in the criminal activity.

The 2000 remake of Gone in 60 Seconds movie highlighted the star car character "Eleanor," a customized 1967 Mustang. Some custom car businesses began to reproduce "Eleanor"-looking cars with the trademarked name, causing Denice Halicki to again take legal action to protect the trademark and the copyrighted Eleanor's image. In 2008, Halicki won a case against Shelby, who was also selling "Eleanor" using the trademark name and copyrighted image.

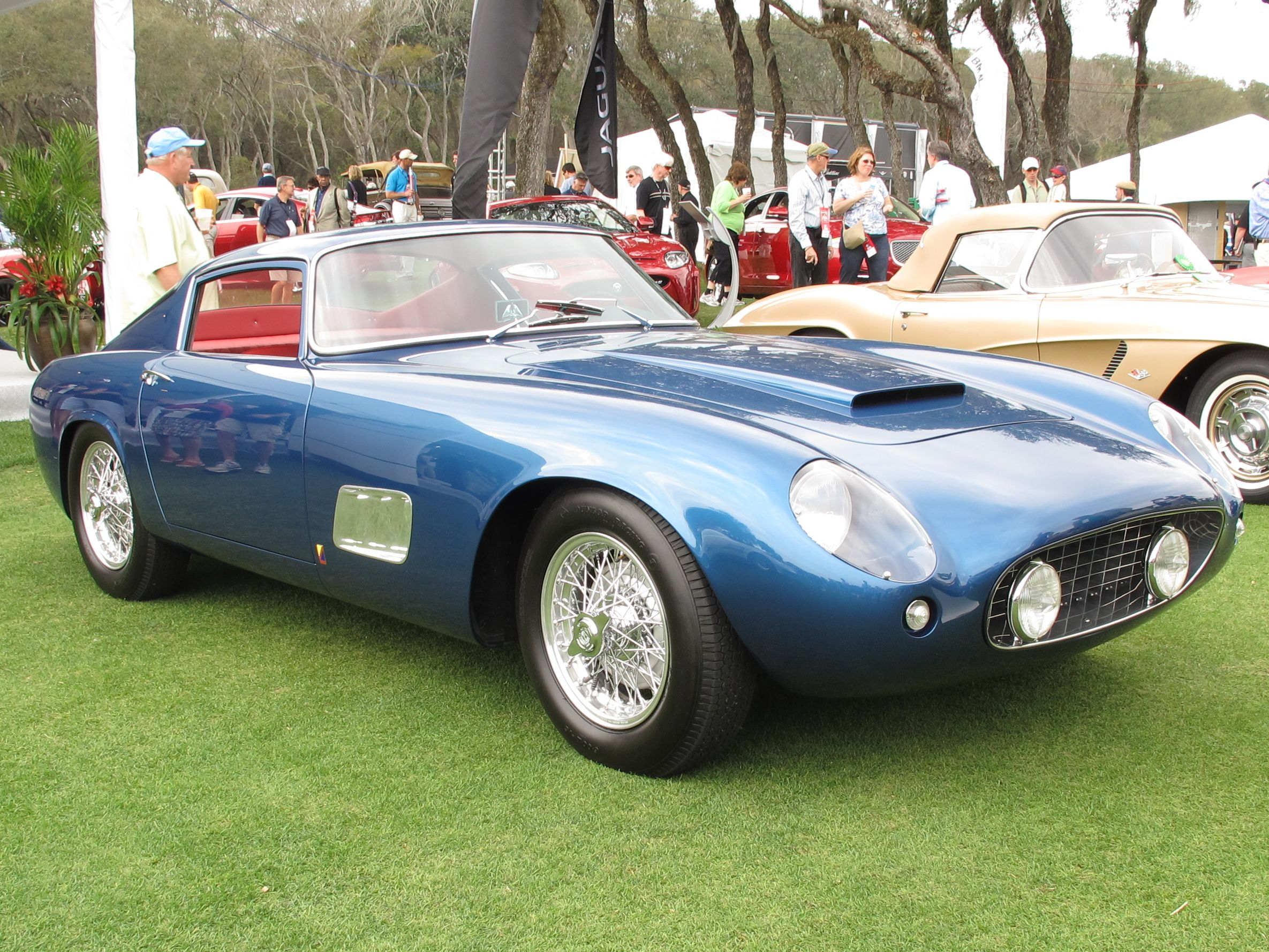
1959 Scaglietti Corvette

Gary Laughlin, a wealthy Texas oilman and amateur racer, and Shelby decided to build a dual-purpose car based on the Chevrolet Corvette chassis and European-style alloy coachwork. Laughlin met with Sergio Scaglietti, who agreed to produce a small run of bodies for the Corvette chassis. At the time, Scaglietti was busy turning out Ferrari's Tour de France and purpose-built racing cars. The completed car, dubbed the Scaglietti Corvette, arrived in Texas in the fall of 1960, almost 18 months after the chassis had been obtained. It proved to be the only one of the three to be finished in Italy and shipped back to the United States as a complete car. GM's Ed Cole, who had helped to procure the Corvette chassis, was chastised by GM management and told to drop the project. The remaining cars were shipped to Houston in a partially completed state. Shelby declined to buy a car and it was promptly sold.

== Other projects ==
Shelby licensed his name to many non-automotive products. His name and other trademarks associated with him are licensed to other companies by Carroll Shelby Licensing, a subsidiary of holding company Carroll Shelby International.

Shelby, a founder of the Terlingua International Chili Championship in Terlingua, Texas, lent his name to a chili fixings kit consisting of spices in several packets that used to come in a brown paper bag, but now comes in a box. On the side of the bag was a story from Shelby about cooking chili during his racing days. On the front of the bag was a depiction of a big western black hat, a trademark piece of clothing for Shelby. The product has since been bought by Reily Products who have discontinued the inclusion of a separate salt packet.

In 1967, Shelby marketed "Carroll Shelby's Pit-Stop ... a Real Man's Deodorant" that was promoted in car magazines.

Shelby was the initial partner of Dan Gurney in Gurney's All American Racers.

Donzi Marine developed the Donzi Shelby 22 GT, a 22-foot (7 m) speedboat based on their Classic line of boats in collaboration with Shelby.

Shelby produced a line of eight-spoke alloy wheels for Saab automobiles in the early to mid-1980s. They were available in gold (Goldvane), hammered silver (Silvervane) finish, and a black hammered finish. These wheels were available through Saab dealers and could be fitted to Saab 99 and Saab 900 models manufactured through 1987.

Shelby supported a project with Rucker Performance Motorcycles to manufacture 12 Shelby motorcycles that were designed by William Rucker.

In 2008, Shelby was awarded the 2008 Automotive Executive of the Year Award.

Shelby established the Carroll Shelby Children's Foundation to cover medical bills of children who have heart disease but are unable to pay for treatment.

In 2008, Shelby began funding scholarships for the automotive program at Northeast Texas Community College, the local community college in his hometown of Leesburg, which renamed the program for him. The Carroll Shelby Foundation continues to fund scholarships and the program.

== Memoir ==
Shelby's memoir, The Carroll Shelby Story, was published in 1967 by Pocket Books. In 2019, the book was re-released by Graymalkin Media for the opening of Ford v Ferrari, a 2019 American sports drama film. The memoir describes his days as a race car driver and the genesis of the Shelby Cobra.

== Personal life ==
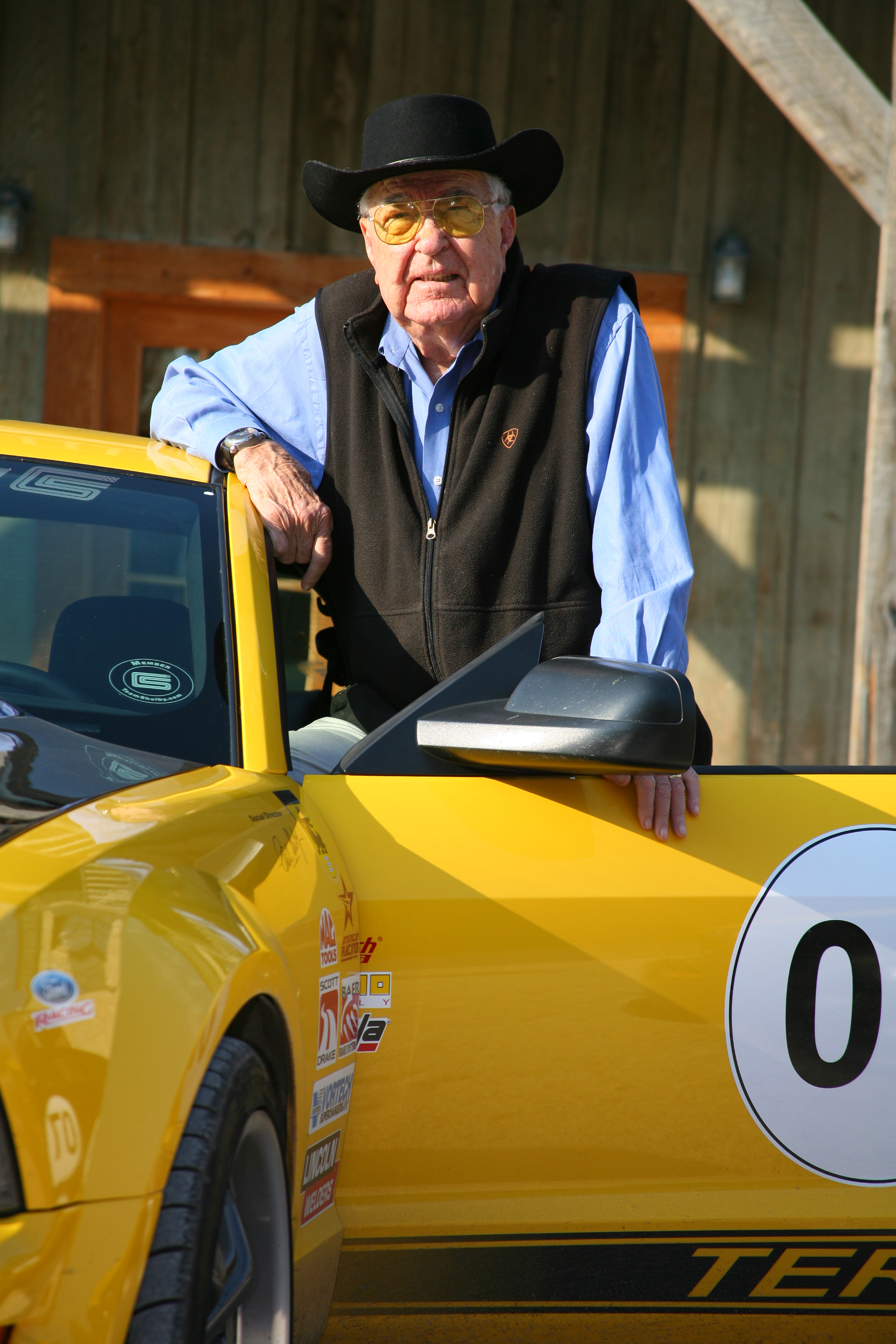
Shelby at a Terlingua event in 2008

Shelby was married seven times; the first and last marriages lasted 15 years before divorce proceedings.

Shelby's first wife was Jeanne Fields; they married on December 18, 1943. They had three children: Sharon Anne (born September 27, 1944), Michael Hall (born November 2, 1946), and Patrick Bert (born October 23, 1947). They divorced in February 1960.

Shelby later admitted to an extramarital affair with Jan Harrison, an actress. In 1962, Shelby married Harrison, but the marriage was annulled the same year. His third marriage, to a New Zealand woman, which he entered in order to get her into the United States, lasted only a few weeks before ending in divorce. His fourth marriage, to Sandra Brandstetter, lasted a couple of years before ending in divorce.

In 1989, after 28 years of being single, Carroll married Cynthia Psaros, a former actress, beauty queen, and daughter of a retired US Marine colonel fighter pilot. During this marriage, Carroll received his long-awaited heart transplant. Their marriage lasted a few years before ending in divorce. In the 1990s he married Helena "Lena" Dahl, a Swedish woman he had met in 1968. She died in a car accident in 1997. It was his only marriage that did not end in divorce, annulment, or separation.

Just four months after Dahl's death, Shelby married his last wife, Cleo (nee Rendell-Roberts), a British former model who drove rally cars. She was 25 years his junior. They were in the process of divorce when he died in 2012.

Shelby received a heart transplant in 1990 and a kidney transplant in 1996.

Shelby died on May 10, 2012, at the age of 89. He had been suffering from a serious heart ailment for decades.

== Racing record ==
=== Complete Formula One World Championship results ===
(key)

Year	Entrant	Chassis	Engine	1	2	3	4	5	6	7	8	9	10	11	WDC	Pts
1958	Scuderia Centro Sud	Maserati 250F	Maserati 250F1 2.5 L6	ARG	MON	NED	500	BEL	FRA; Ret	GBR; 9	GER		ITA; Ret*		NC	0
1958	Temple Buell	Maserati 250F	Maserati 250F1 2.5 L6									POR; 9	ITA; 4*	MOR	NC	0
1959	David Brown Corporation	Aston Martin DBR4/250	Aston Martin RB6 2.5 L6	MON	500	NED; Ret	FRA	GBR; Ret	GER	POR; 8	ITA; 10	USA			NC	0

* After retiring his original car, entered by Scuderia Centro Sud, Shelby took over Masten Gregory's car, entered by Temple Buell, and finished fourth. No points were awarded for the shared drive.

=== Complete 24 Hours of Le Mans results ===
Year	Team	Co-Drivers	Car	Class	Laps	Pos.	Class Pos.
1954	(United Kingdom) Aston Martin Lagonda	(Belgium) Paul Frère	Aston Martin DB3S	S 3.0	74	DNF (Front axle)	
1959	(United Kingdom) David Brown Racing Dept.	(United Kingdom) Roy Salvadori	Aston Martin DBR1/300	S 3.0	323	1st	1st

=== Complete 12 Hours of Sebring results ===
Year	Team	Co-Drivers	Car	Class	Laps	Pos.	Class Pos.
1954	(United Kingdom) Aston Martin Ltd.	(United States) Charles Wallace	Aston Martin DB3S	S3.0	77	DNF (Rear end)	
1955	(United States) Allen Guiberson	(United States) Phil Hill	Ferrari 750 Monza Spyder	S3.0	182	2nd	1st
1956	(United Kingdom) David Brown & Sons, Ltd.	(United Kingdom) Roy Salvadori	Aston Martin DB3S	S3.0	187	4th	1st
1957	(Italy) Maserati Company	(United Kingdom) Roy Salvadori	Maserati 250S	S3.0	68	DSQ (Illegal refuel)	
1958	(United Kingdom) David Brown & Sons, Ltd.	(United Kingdom) Roy Salvadori	Aston Martin DBR1/300	S3.0	62	DNF (Transmission)	
1959	(United Kingdom) David Brown-Aston Martin	(United Kingdom) Roy Salvadori	Aston Martin DBR1/300	S3.0	32	DNF (Gear lever)	
1960	(United States) Camoradi USA	(United States) Masten Gregory	Maserati Tipo 61	S3.0	3	DNF (Engine)	

== In popular culture ==
Shelby is portrayed by Matt Damon in Ford v. Ferrari, a 2019 film about the 1960s rivalry between Ford and Ferrari at the Le Mans auto race and Shelby's friendship with race car driver Ken Miles.

Shelby American: The Carroll Shelby Story is a 2019 feature-length documentary about Shelby's life and career.

Shelby features prominently in Bill Cosby's comedic story "200 M.P.H." (1968). Shelby (voiced by Cosby) convinces Cosby that, since he was an American, he should drive an "American car" – specifically, a custom-made Shelby Cobra that was guaranteed to go 200 mph, faster than any foreign sports car. The story takes up the entire second side of Cosby's seventh album, 200 M.P.H.

Though it does not feature him personally, a major plot point of the 2014 film Need for Speed involves the last Mustang that Carroll Shelby was building when he died. The protagonist's team finishes building it out and are able to push it to 234 mph. It then features prominently in the second act of the film.

== See also ==
- The Snake and the Stallion

Sporting positions
Preceded by Olivier Gendebien; Phil Hill	Winner of the 24 Hours of Le Mans; 1959; With: Roy Salvadori	Succeeded by Olivier Gendebien; Paul Frère
