= The Carroll Shelby Story =

Autobiography by Carroll Shelby

- Paperback edition
- Author: Carroll Shelby
- Language: English
- Genre: Memoir
- Published: 1967
- Publisher: Graymalkin Media
- Publication date: 16 January 2020
- Publication place: United States
- Media type: Print
- Pages: 271
- ISBN: 978-1631682872
- OCLC: 1139709769

The Carroll Shelby Story is a memoir by Carroll Shelby published in 1967 by Pocket Books. The book is a revised and enlarged version of The Cobra Story, covering the Cobra's successes in 1965 and 1966, as well as including technical specifications for the 289 and 427 Cobras.

== Background ==
In the autobiography, Shelby discusses his life changing win at Le Mans in 1966 with driver Ken Miles against rival car manufacturer, Ferrari. He also describes his days as a race car driver, the challenges, the victories, and the crashes — the worst of which he describes as an “explosion.” He talks about his philosophies on racing such as, “If you’re going to go around worrying about getting killed, you might as well give up racing.” He writes two chapters about how he won the race at Le Mans in 1959, saying, “It knocks the hell out of a driver and it knocks the hell out of a car.” The memoir also discusses the genesis for the revolutionary car he created, the Shelby Cobra.

== Reception ==
The contemporary review of The Cobra Story by Kirkus Reviews stated, "The lanky Texan's autobiography is short on grammar but long on building motors, racing frames and surviving hairbreadth escapes (one wreck with a Maserati cost him 72 stitches). He was early bit by the racing bug and even turned to airplanes for a while. He tells of the uncomfortable effect of racing on his marriage; his Air Corps service during WWII; and of the final big event when his Cobra beat the Ferrari, which had won for three years running. Shelby has none of the insight into racing which distinguishes Stirling Moss's books. And though he discusses motors far more intimately than the average reader will care about, his races often work up a real head of steam."

== Film ==
In 2020, the book was rereleased by Graymalkin Media for the opening of Ford v Ferrari (titled Le Mans '66 in the UK and other territories), a 2019 American sports drama film starring Matt Damon and Christian Bale. For his performance, Bale was nominated for the Golden Globe Award for Best Actor – Drama and the Screen Actors Guild Award for Outstanding Performance by a Male Actor in a Leading Role.
