= Shelby Can-Am =

Defunct series of sports car

- Category: Sports car
- Constructor: Racefab Inc.
- Designers: Carroll Shelby; Pete Brock (bodywork); David Bruns (chassis)

Technical specifications
- Suspension (front): Upper & lower unequal length tubular steel A-arms, adjustable hollow anti-roll bars and aluminum uprights
- Suspension (rear): Upper & lower unequal length tubular steel A-arms, adjustable hollow anti-roll bars and aluminum uprights
- Length: 168.5 in (428.0 cm)
- Width: 77.5 in (196.9 cm)
- Height: 41 in (104.1 cm)
- Engine: Dodge (1991-1996); Nissan VQ35 (2000-present); 3,300 cc (201.4 cu in) (1991-1996); 3,500 cc (213.6 cu in) (2010-present) V6 mid
- Weight: 850 kg (1,873.9 lb)

Competition history
- Debut: 1991

The Shelby Can-Am is a sports car that had its own racing class in the United States between 1991 and 1996. Some of the models were shipped off to South Africa to race there, where they continued to be campaigned until about 2015.

== History ==
Shelby Dodge Pro Series (1991-1996) MSA Shelby Can-Am (2000-2015)
- Category: Sports cars
- Country: USA; South Africa
- Inaugural season: 1991 (USA); 2000 (South Africa)
- Folded: 1996 (USA); 2015 (South Africa)
- Constructors: Racefab Inc.
- Engine suppliers: Dodge (1991-1996); Nissan (2000-present)
- Tyre suppliers: Goodyear (1991-1996); Hoosier (2000-present)

=== United States ===
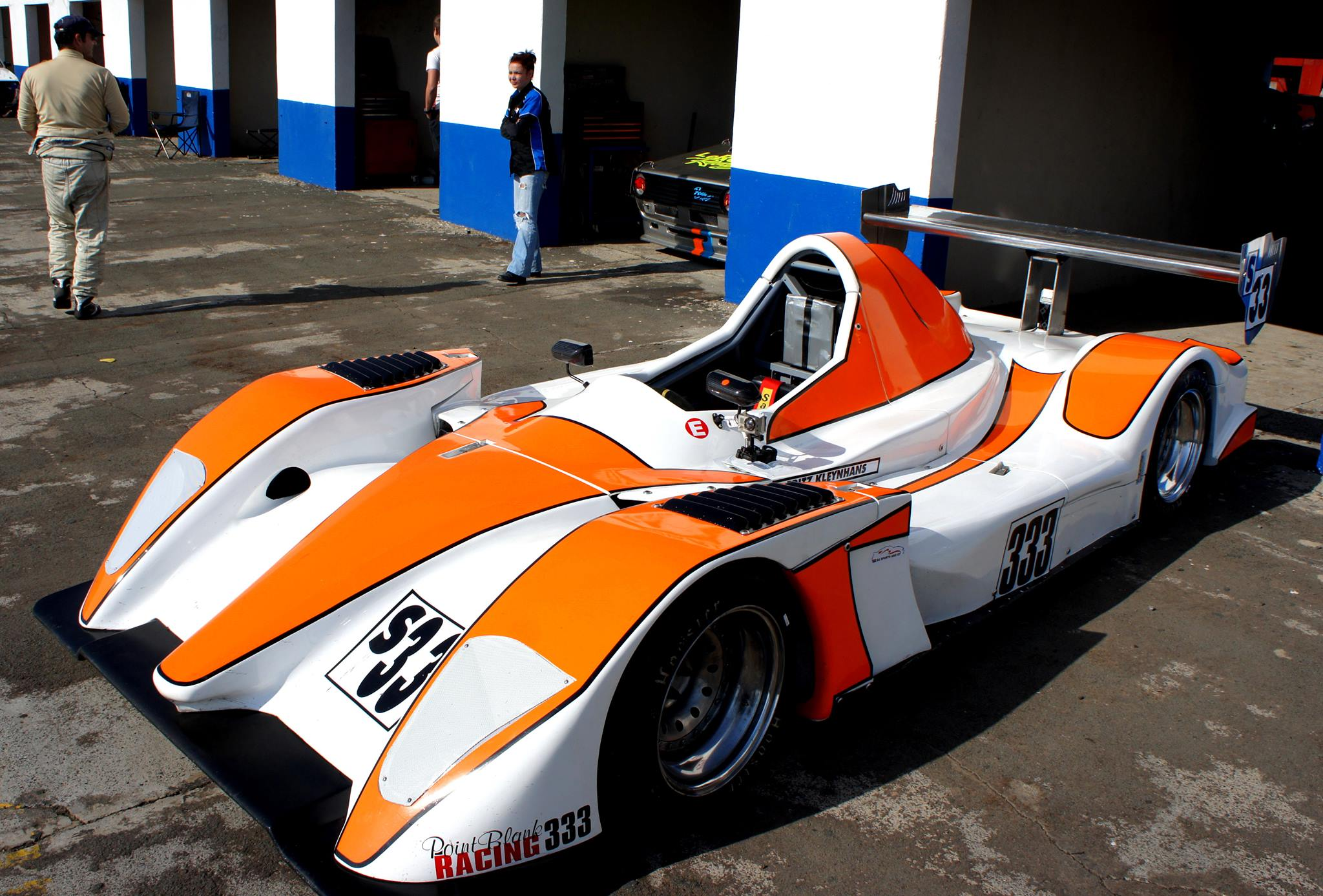
A Shelby Can-Am race car

After the original Can-Am folded after the 1987 season the SCCA looked for a new sports car class. In 1989 Caroll Shelby joined the SCCA to design a new single make sports car racing car. The car, built by Racefab Inc., went in production in 1990. The first race was a demonstration event during the SCCA National Championship Runoffs. The Shelby Can-Am class, and a pro series were launched by the SCCA in 1991. The pro series ran for six years. Memo Gidley made his pro racing debut in 1993. It also was a class at the SCCA National Championship Runoffs between 1991 and 1996. 20 drivers started the 1991 Runoffs race. David Tenney, who started from pole-position, won the race. The following year the field was drastically reduced to 14 drivers. Only four drivers started the last Shelby Can-Am Runoffs race in 1996. Chassis number #066 was converted into a Le Mans Prototype. The car, the LR-93, was entered by Cliff Rassweiler and James Lee in the 1993 IMSA GT Championship. The car failed to finish both races it was entered due to mechanical failure. The car was restored to the original Shelby Can-Am specifications and shipped off to South Africa.

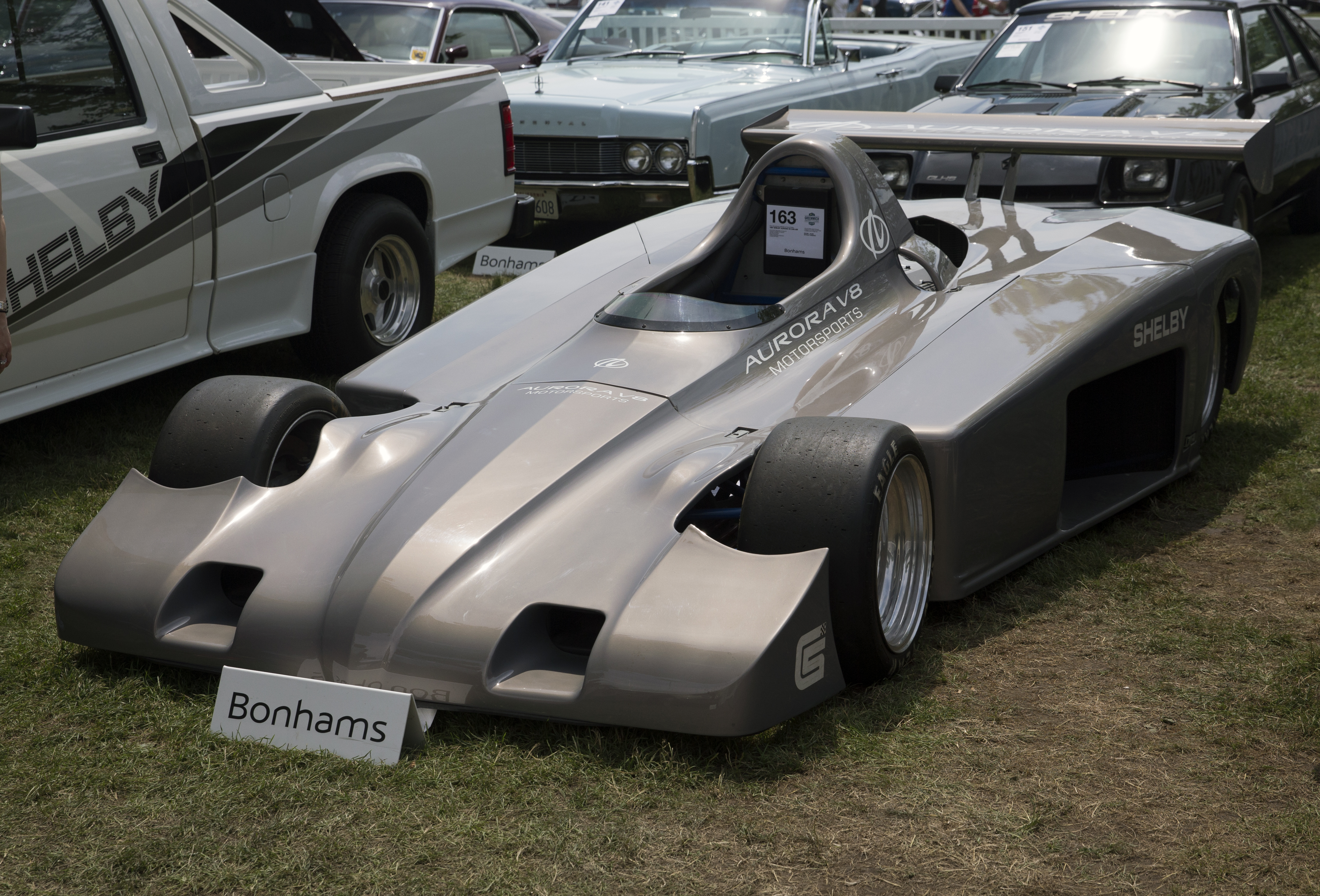
The 1997 Oldsmobile Aurora V8-powered prototype

In 1997, Shelby finished an Oldsmobile-powered prototype meant to continue the Can-Am series, but it remained a one-off. It had the new four-cam Aurora V8 engine, tuned to about 500 hp (370 kW).

=== South Africa ===
In 1998 there was a need for a Development class in SA and the Sports 2000 class was used for this vision and South Africa's motorsports sanctioning body was looking for an alternative to replace the successful Sports 2000 class with 32 cars on National level. 28 Shelby Can-Am cars were bought up and shipped to South Africa. The aging Dodge engine was replaced by a Nissan VQ35 engine. The series was launched with financial support from Vodacom which would be a naming sponsor of the series until 2005. The inaugural season saw 39 different drivers at least competing in at least one race. The series was part of the Pro-Tour at first, joining the other national racing classes of South Africa. In 2008 Jeroen Bleekemolen raced one weekend in the series in preparation of the A1GP weekend at Kyalami. The Dutch driver achieved a pole position but had no luck in the races with two DNF's. He returned the following year again achieving a pole position. This converted in a win in the first race. Both times Bleekemolen replaced regular driver Bertil Hoffman, whom also races under a Dutch licence.

For 2008 the Can-Am cars got a new bodywork. This bodywork made the cars look more like a modern-day Le Mans Prototype. As of the 2013 season the class merged with a GT series to form the SA Sports & V8 GT. To limit costs tyre usage and car modifications are strictly regulated. The Shelby Can-Am made its first appearance in The African Six Hour in 2013. A Juno Group CN car won the race but Shelby Can-Am cars filled the rest of the top five. At Phakisa Freeway, Thomas Reib and Sean Greve were classified in second place, the best result of the Shelby Can-Am cars.2014 Final round of 2014 Regional Races at Killarney as well as the Africa 3 Hour which finished with a fantastic tussle between the two local Juno entries. Francis Carruthers (Scotland) and Nick Adcock (England), Malta Juno SS3 3.0 taking a 10.048 second victory from Steve Humble and Ferdi van Niekerk Jnr in their Malta Juno CN 2.0. Third overall went to Mark Lauth and Mike Verrier, Black Chrome Shelby Can-Am. In 2014 Alan Eve is the overall winner of the 2014 Shelby Can-Am Racing National Championship, Master Champion and the overall 2014 SA Sports and V8 Supercars Champion. 2015 Shelby Can-Am Racing competitors will run in the African Endurance series with the 6 Hour Phakisa Freeway race first up on 28 February 2015.

Chassis shipped off to South Africa
#003
#004
#007
#010
#016
#017
#018
#020
#022
#025
#027
#029
#034
#036
#042
#044
#047 (crashed at Kyalami in 2001)
#048
#050 was bought as a spare chassis
#052
#053
#057
#058
#062
#064
#066
#072
#074

== Car ==
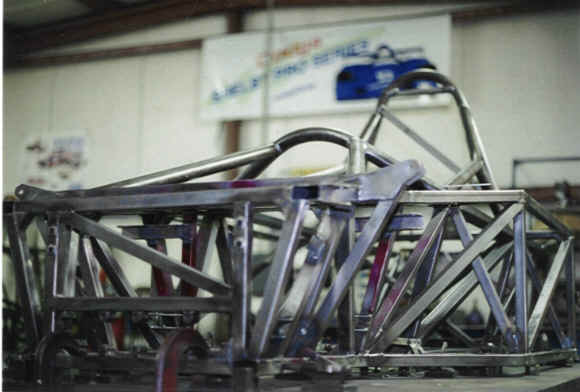
A Shelby Can Am tube frame chassis on the surface plate at Racefab Inc.

Initially two prototypes were built, chassis numbers PX-1 and PX-2. Steve Hope was one of the testdrivers. The first complete chassis was bought by W. Jerry Gillis, who would win the 1996 Pro Series title. The cars were built by Racefab Inc. from Rusk, Texas. The tube frame chassis, designed by David Bruns was fitted with a four-speed Weismann transaxle. The engine was production based derived from a Dodge Intrepid. The Dodge engine was upgraded to produce 255hp. Pete Brock designed the wedge-shaped body.

When the car was introduced in South Africa the Dodge engine was replaced by a Nissan VQ engine as used on the Nissan 350Z. The engine capacity increased to 3500cc and the horsepower increased to 300 hp. The bodywork designed by Peter Brock in 1989 was replaced by a modern redesign in 2006 by Gregary Bailey giving it a more modern Le Mans Prototype look. In 2012 a second version body design was completed again by Bailey. This design incorporated front splitter and a rear venturi tunnel. The design was based on the Bailey LMP2. The new body was built in South Africa by Bailey Cars. The new design increased downforce and reduced drag with reduced lap times by 2 seconds per lap at Zwartkops Raceway. The Bodywork was made out of fibreglass.

== Champions ==
Year	Driver	Chassis	National Championship Runoffs	Chassis	June Sprints	Chassis
1991	(United States) David Tenney	#032	(United States) David Tenney	#032		
1992	(United States) Scott Harrington	#008	(United States) David Tenney	#032		
1993	(United States) Kyle Konzer	#043	(United States) Mike Davies	#055	(United States) Jim Heule	#058
1994	(United States) Mike Davies	#055	(United States) Mike Davies	#055		
1995	(United States) Mike Davies	#055	(United States) Mike Davies	#055		
1996	(United States) W. Jerry Gillis	#001	(United States) Jeffrey Tyler	#046		
Shelby Can-Am South Africa
1999	(South Africa) Francois Gerber	#042				
2000	(South Africa) Francois Gerber	#042				
2001	(South Africa) George Ferreira	#072				
2002	(South Africa) Bernard Tilanus	#003				
2003	(South Africa) Neil Lobb	#066				
2004	(South Africa) Garth Waberski	#050				
2005	(South Africa) Neil Lobb	#066				
2006	(South Africa) Ruan Pretorius	#050				
2007	(South Africa) Darryn Lobb	#062				
2008	(South Africa) (Portugal) Rui Campos	#048				
2009	(South Africa) Darryn Lobb	#066				
2010	(South Africa) Darryn Lobb	#066				
2011	(South Africa) (Portugal) Rui Campos	#048				
2012	(South Africa) (Portugal) Rui Campos	#048				
2013	(South Africa) (Portugal) Rui Campos	#048				
2014	(South Africa) Alan Eve	#058				

== Other notable drivers ==
=== United States ===
- Memo Gidley (former ChampCar driver)
- Sam Schmidt (Indy Racing League team owner and former driver)
- Yoichi Akase (former Atlantic Championship driver)
- Augie Pabst, III (owner of Pabst Racing Services)

=== South Africa ===
- Jeroen Bleekemolen (American Le Mans Series driver)
- Wesleigh Orr (former A1GP rookie driver)
