= Racefab Inc. =

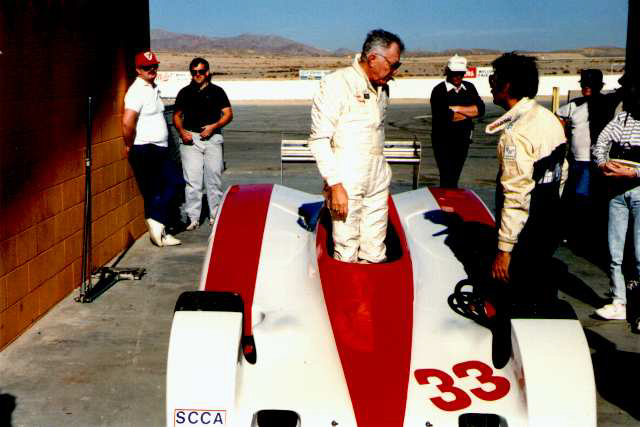
Carroll Shelby drives the Shelby Can Am

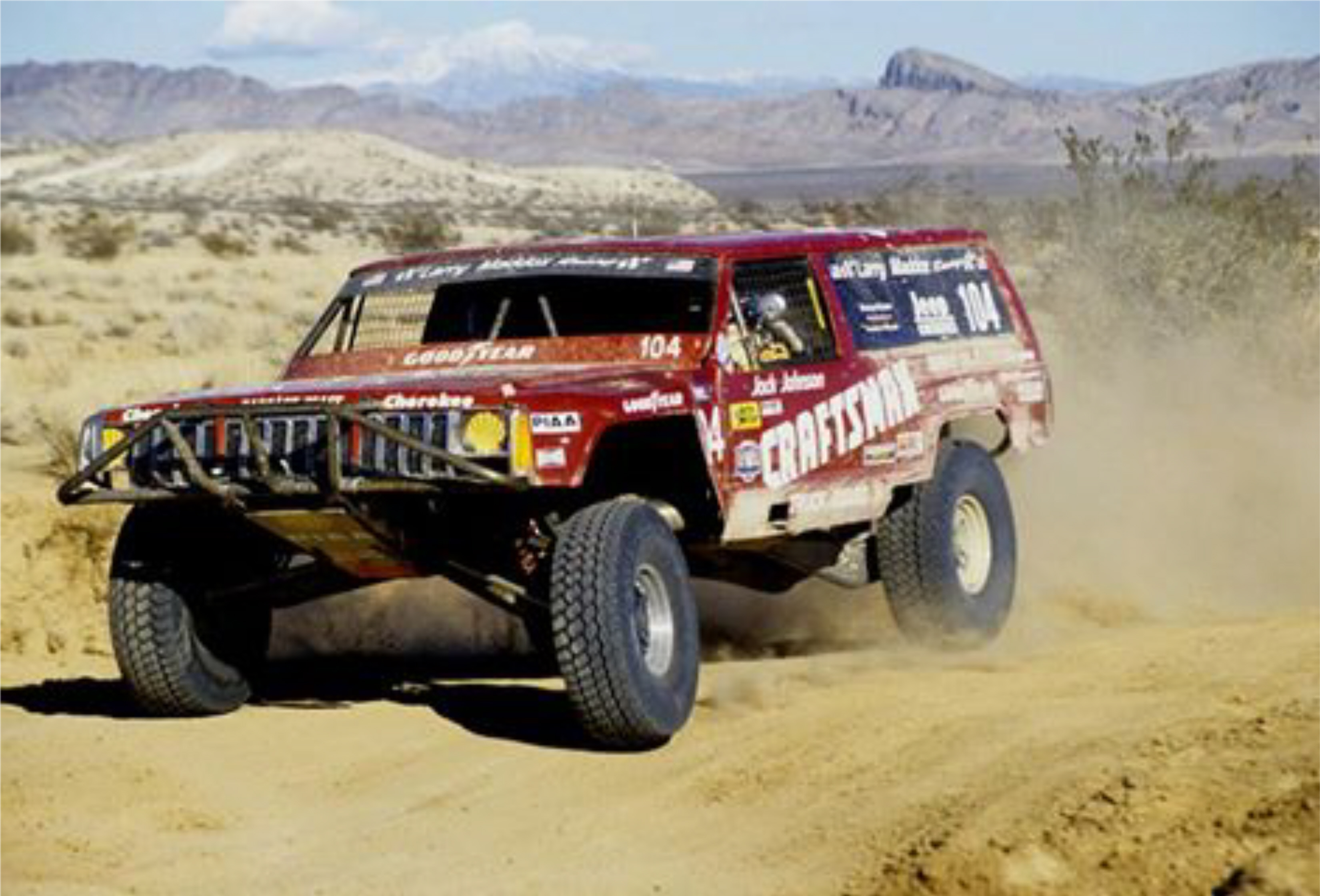
Class 1 Factory Jeep Trophy Truck

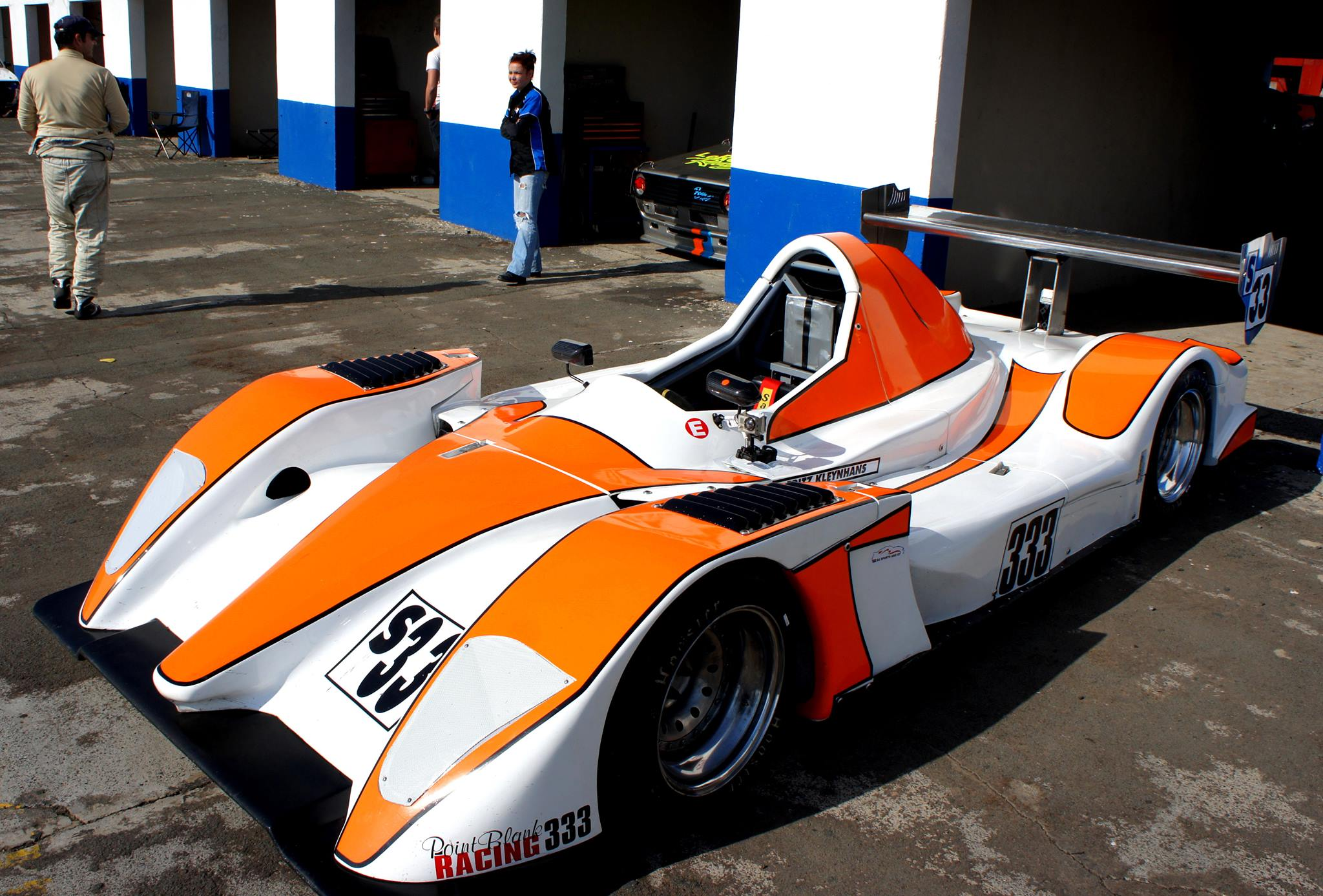
Racefab Shelby Can Am

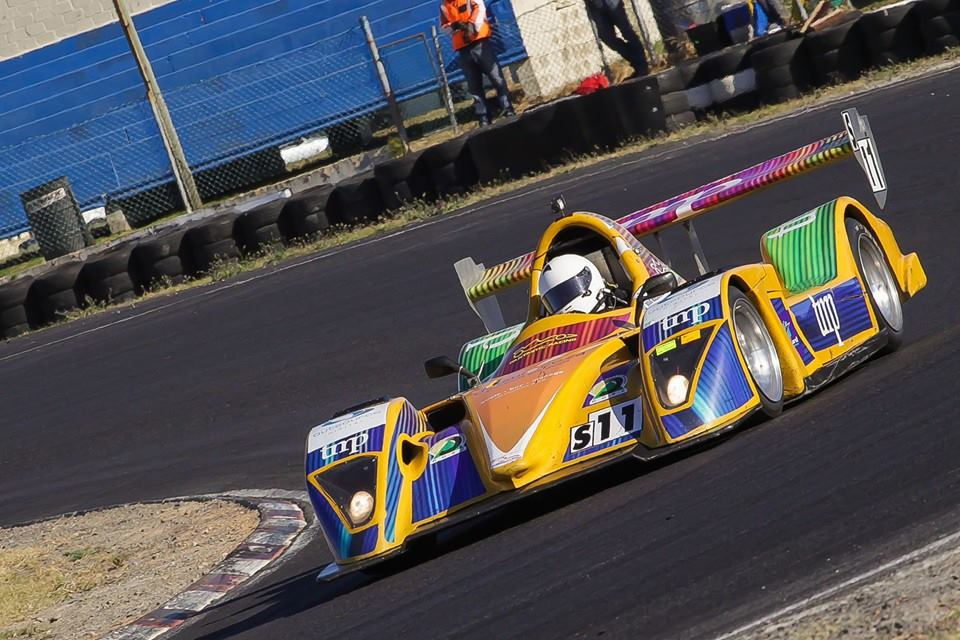
Racefab Shelby Can Am in competition in South Africa

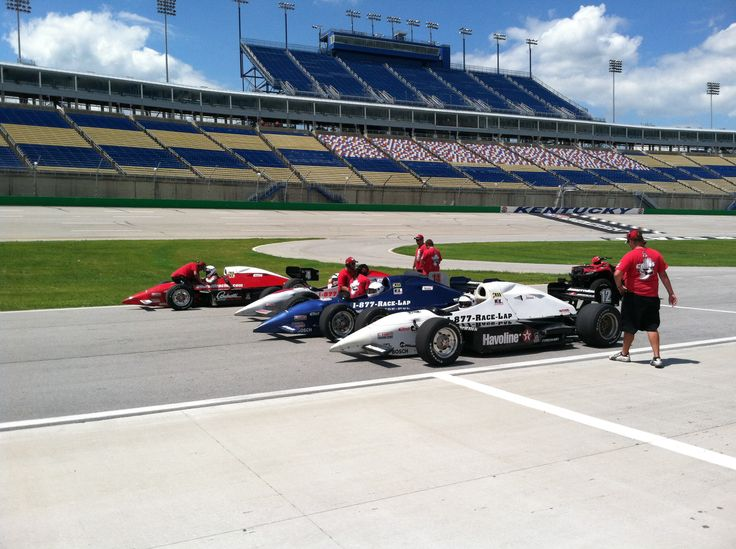
Racefab Inc Indy Cars used by the Mario Andretti Driving Experience

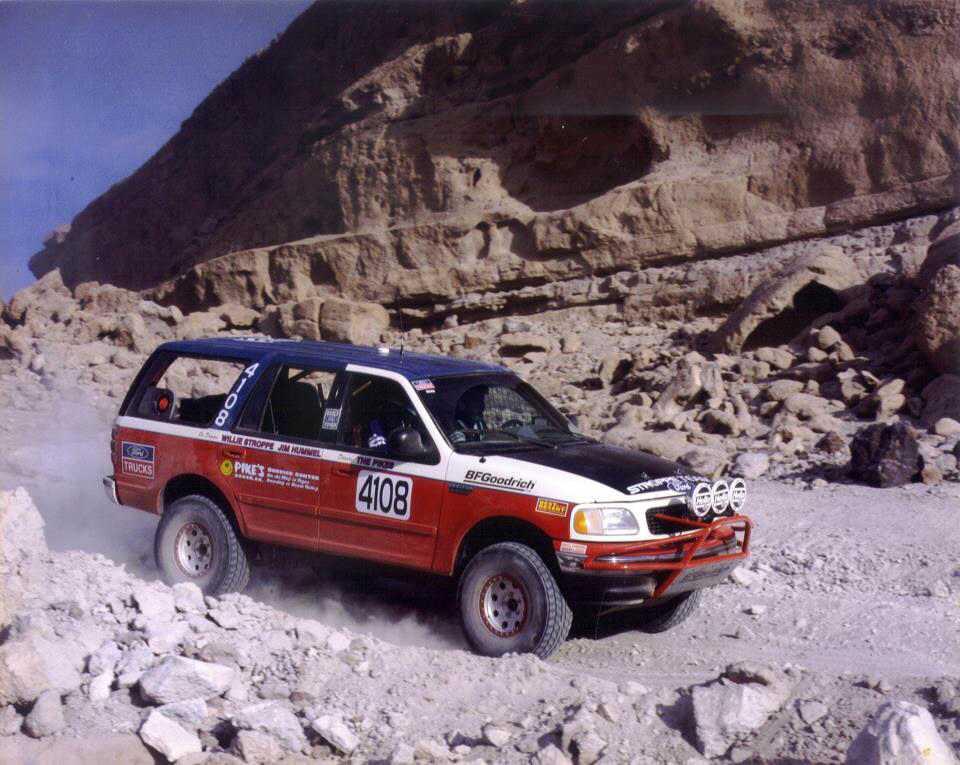
Nevada 2000 3rd Place

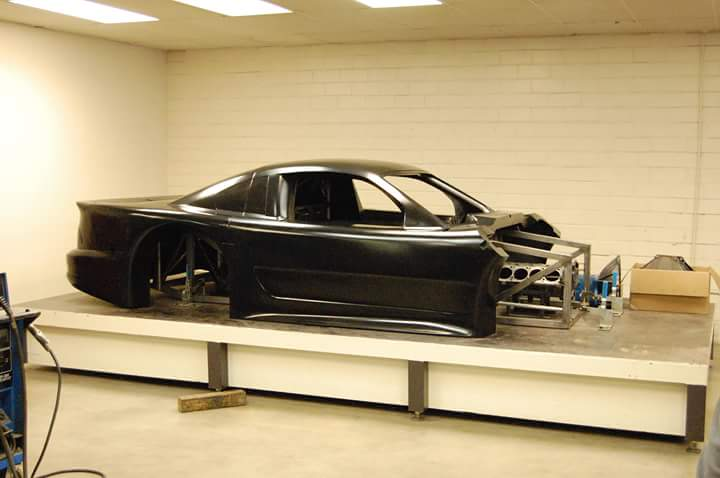
Racefab Gt1 Mustang body and chassis

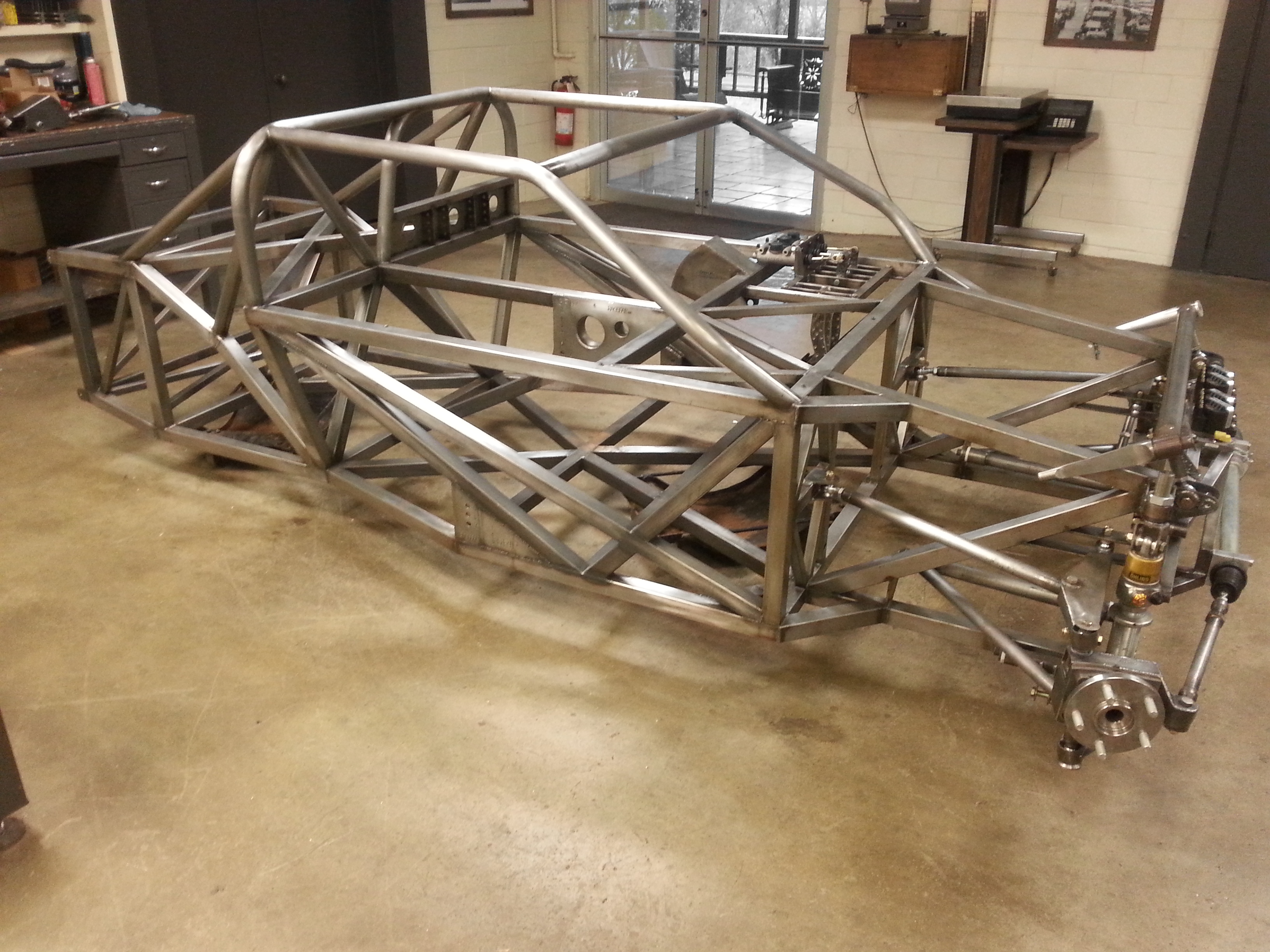
Racefab 2015 TransAm Chassis

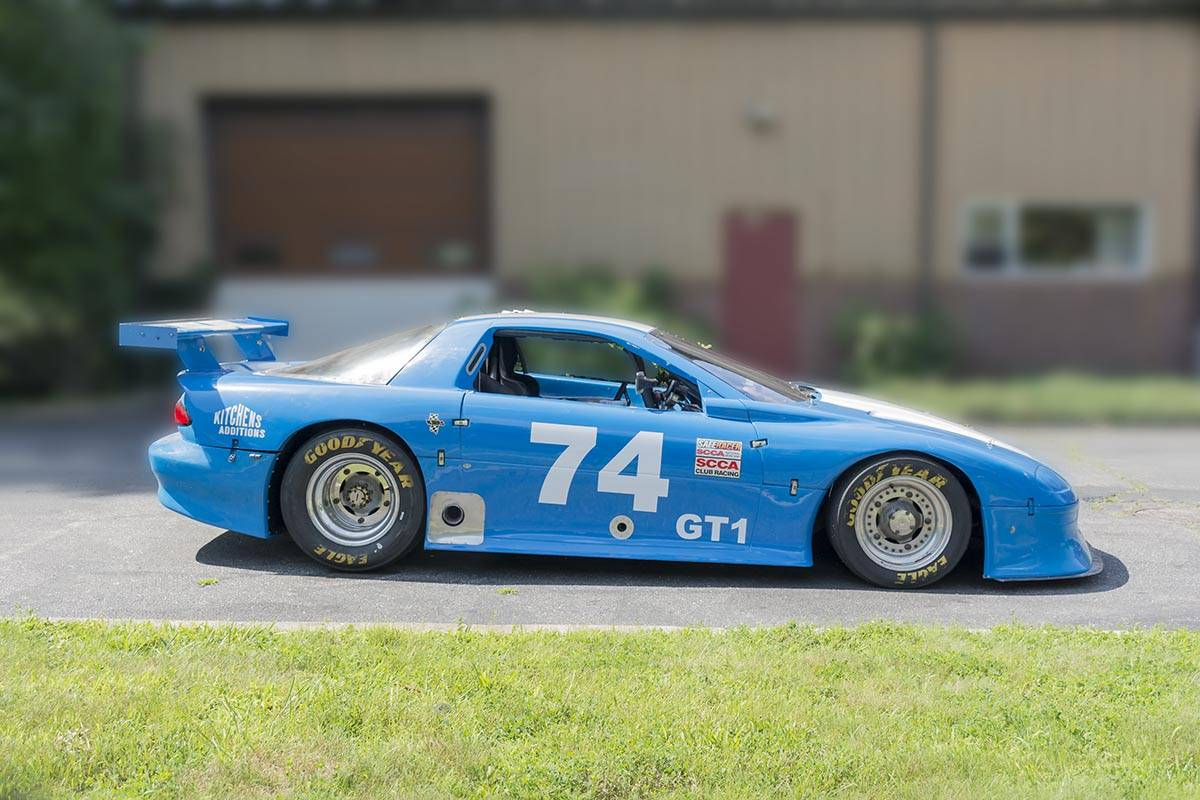
Racefab GT1 camaro

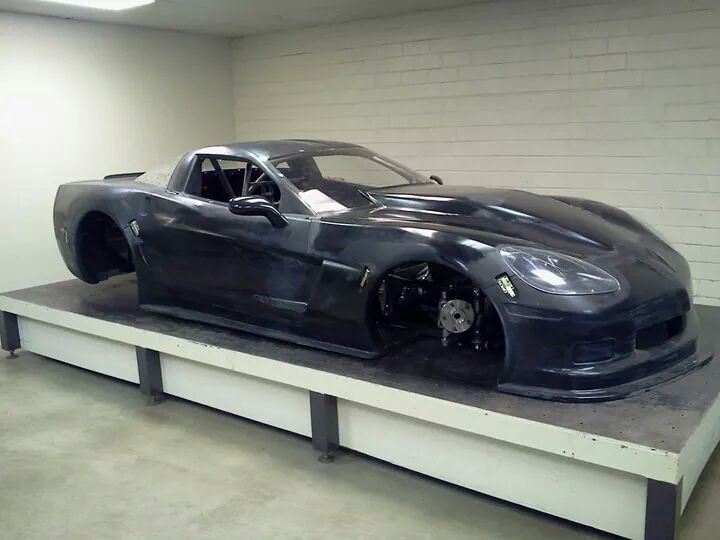
Racefab Inc. Corvette C6 GT1 under construction

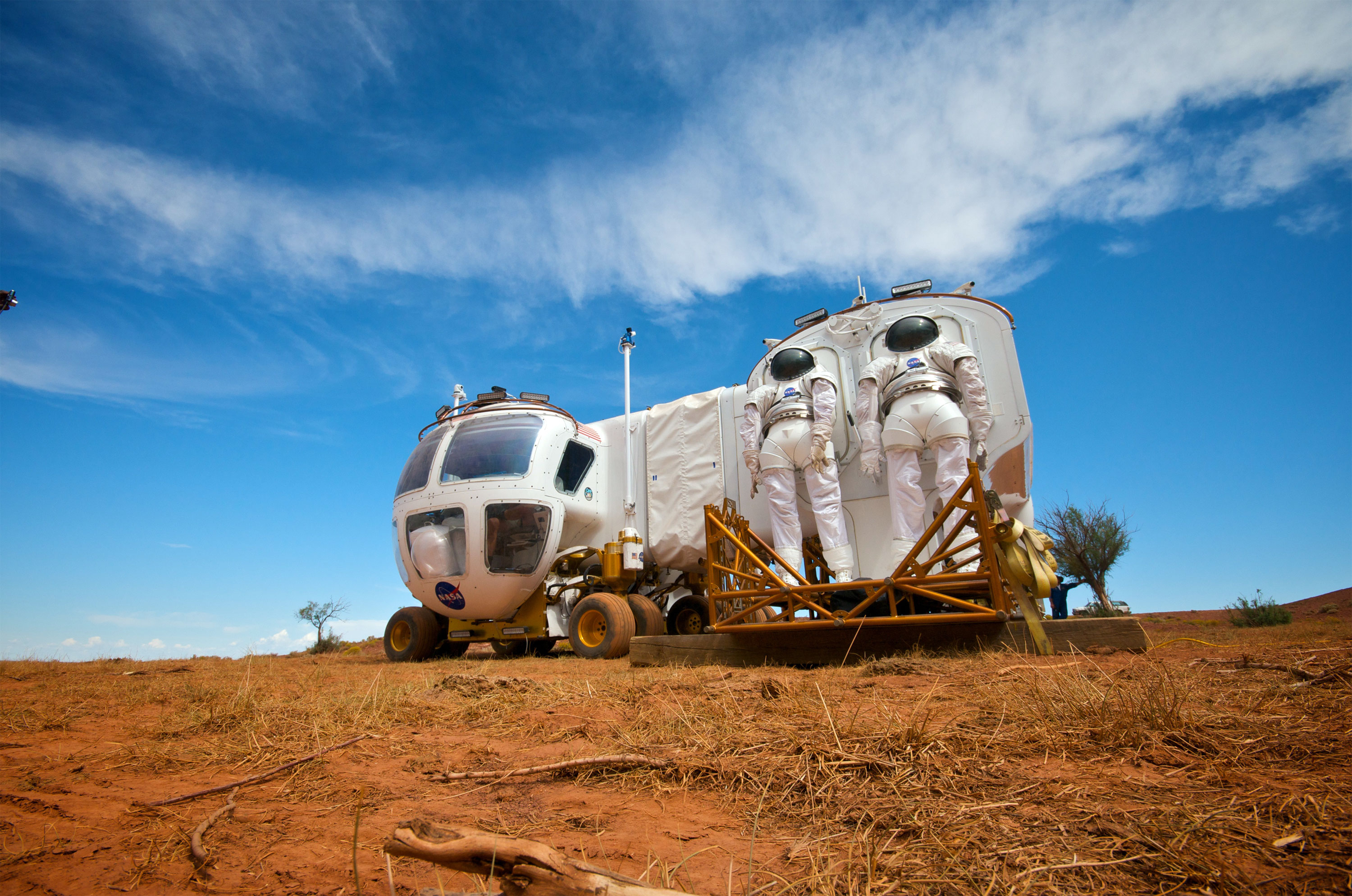
Racefab Inc. built L.E.R.

Racefab Inc. is a company formed by Joel Jackson in 1991.

Based in Rusk, Texas, Racefab Inc. is a North American designer and manufacturer of competition automobiles for sports car and prototype racing, as well as desert racing under the name of Off-Road International. They have constructed over 600 racers for competition around the world.

== History ==
Before opening Racefab Inc., Joel worked designing, constructing, and as crew chief at Shelby Automobiles, where his efforts led to numerous SCCA victories and in 1988, an IMSA championship in International Sedan competition as well as special recognition for his efforts receiving the IMSA TRW Mechanic of the Year Award. Here, Joel worked on the design/build team for The Shelby Can-Am and was crew chief for the development of the spec racer. Here, he also worked designing and building the prototype for the Dodge Viper. After leaving Shelby Automobiles, Joel began work on the factory Jeep motorsports team in SCORE International competition working to design and develop what would become one of the original Trophy Trucks for off-road racing. This truck went on to win the SCORE Championship in 1997 as well as the 1995 Baja 500.

First opening in 1991 in Houston, Racefab Inc. began designing and building chassis for SCCA GT1 and Trans Am Series competition. This same year, they were contracted as the official constructor for the Shelby Dodge Pro Series, building over 80 chassis with suspension and spares. At the end of 1996, the SCCA Shelby Dodge Pro Series ended, but the cars continued to compete in SCCA Club Racing and soon found a home overseas in South Africa. These cars are at the top level of African motorsports competing in their own series as well as in endurance events to this day, where they compete for and win overall.

Racefab's efforts in GT1 and Trans Am have also continued with multiple victories. They are the only constructor to win the South Atlantic Road Racing Championship and the North Atlantic Road Racing Championships in the same year, as well numerous SCCA championships and the Canadian GT Championship.

In 1998, Racefab Inc. partnered with CART to construct a driving experience series called CART Driving 101. Designs included a single seat Champ Car and a tandem seat Champ Car for ride-alongs. After CART ended in 2004, Driving 101 became The Mario Andretti Racing Experience. You can drive one of these Indy Cars today as they travel around the US. In 2001, these cars went on to be used in the movie Driven starring Sylvester Stallone.

In 1999, Racefab re-located to Rusk, Texas where they are presently located. In that same year, they began work with Ford Motor Company to design and construct a Ford Expedition for the Best in the Desert Nevada 2000, a 2,000 mile desert race to celebrate the year 2000 that circled the entire state. With very little testing, the Expedition finished the event, taking 3rd place on the podium. Here Racefab Inc. created their off-road division Off-Road International, to head their off-road racing program.

Along with developing an off-road racing program under Off-Road International, they also worked to create Scientific Exploration Vehicles as well as a line of off-road accessories. In 2007, Racefab Inc., working with NASA was contracted to work on the design and construction of two Lunar Electric Rovers under the Advanced Explorations Systems Program. These were constructed for the planned 2020 Orion Missions for the planned return to the Moon. In 2009, the Racefab Inc. built rovers participated in the First inauguration of Barack Obama concluding the ceremonies. The rovers were later featured in an episode of Top Gear as well as many other print publications. After the Orion program was cancelled, the rovers were reclassified as Space Exploration Vehicles and given new missions for the future including Mars Exploration as well as asteroid landings. The rovers can be seen in action on Mars before they launch however in the 2015 film The Martian starring Matt Damon.

Today Racefab Inc continues to build on its accomplishments and creating unique vehicles for a variety of applications. For 2015, a Racefab Inc. built Camaro placed 3rd in Open Class at the Pikes Peak International Hill Climb and in South Africa, a Racefab Inc. prototype took top honors with an overall victory at the 3-hour Phakisa Freeway endurance race.

== Accomplishments ==
- 1988 Founder Joel Jackson wins IMSA IS championship
- 1988 IMSA TRW Mechanic of the Year awarded to Joel
- 1989 Design, Builds, Develops Shelby Can Am
- 1989 Design and builds Dodge Viper Prototype
- 1990 Design, builds and crew chief for factory Jeep desert racer
- 1991 Racefab Inc. is founded
- 1991 Racefab Inc. official constructor Shelby/Dodge Pro Series
- 1991-1996 SCCA Pro Racing Champions
- 1991-1996 SCCA National Run-offs Champions
- 1995 1st Place SCCA June Sprints
- Canadian GT Champions
- North Atlantic Road Racing Champions
- South Atlantic Road Racing Champions
- 1995 1st place SCORE Baja 500
- 1997 SCORE International Champions
- 1998 partners with CART Driving 101
- 1999 re-locates to Rusk, Texas
- 2000 3rd place Best In The Desert Nevada 2000
- 2000-2005 South African VodaCom LeMans Champions
- 2001 Racefab Inc. built cars featured in Driven with Sylvester Stallone
- 2004 Mario Andretti Driving School uses Racefab Inc built cars
- 2006-2014 South African Shelby Can Am Champions
- 2007 Racefab Inc. works with NASA to design and construct Lunar Electric Rovers
- 2009 Racefab Inc. L.E.R. concludes Presidential Inaugural Parade
- 2011 Top Gear features Racefab Inc. built L.E.R.
- 2012 Pikes Peak International Hill Climb 2nd Super Stock Car
- 2013 African 6-Hour Enduro 1st place in class and 2nd-5th overall
- 2014 African 3-Hour Enduro 1st place in class 3rd Overall
- 2015 African 3-Hour Enduro 1st place in class 1st Overall
- 2015 Pikes Peak International Hill Climb 3rd place Unlimited
- 2015 Racefab Built L.E.R. featured in The Martian with Matt Damon
