= Bill Auberlen =

American factory race car driver

- Nationality: (United States) American
- Born: William Anthony Auberlen; October 12, 1968 (age 58) Redondo Beach, California, U.S.

IMSA SportsCar Championship career
- Debut season: 2014
- Current team: Turner Motorsport
- Categorisation: FIA Platinum (until 2017); FIA Gold (2018–2025); FIA Silver (2026–)
- Former teams: BMW Team RLL
- Starts: 101
- Wins: 12
- Podiums: 31
- Best finish: 2nd in 2015, 2017, 2019

Previous series
- American Le Mans Series; Rolex Sports Car Series; IMSA GT Championship

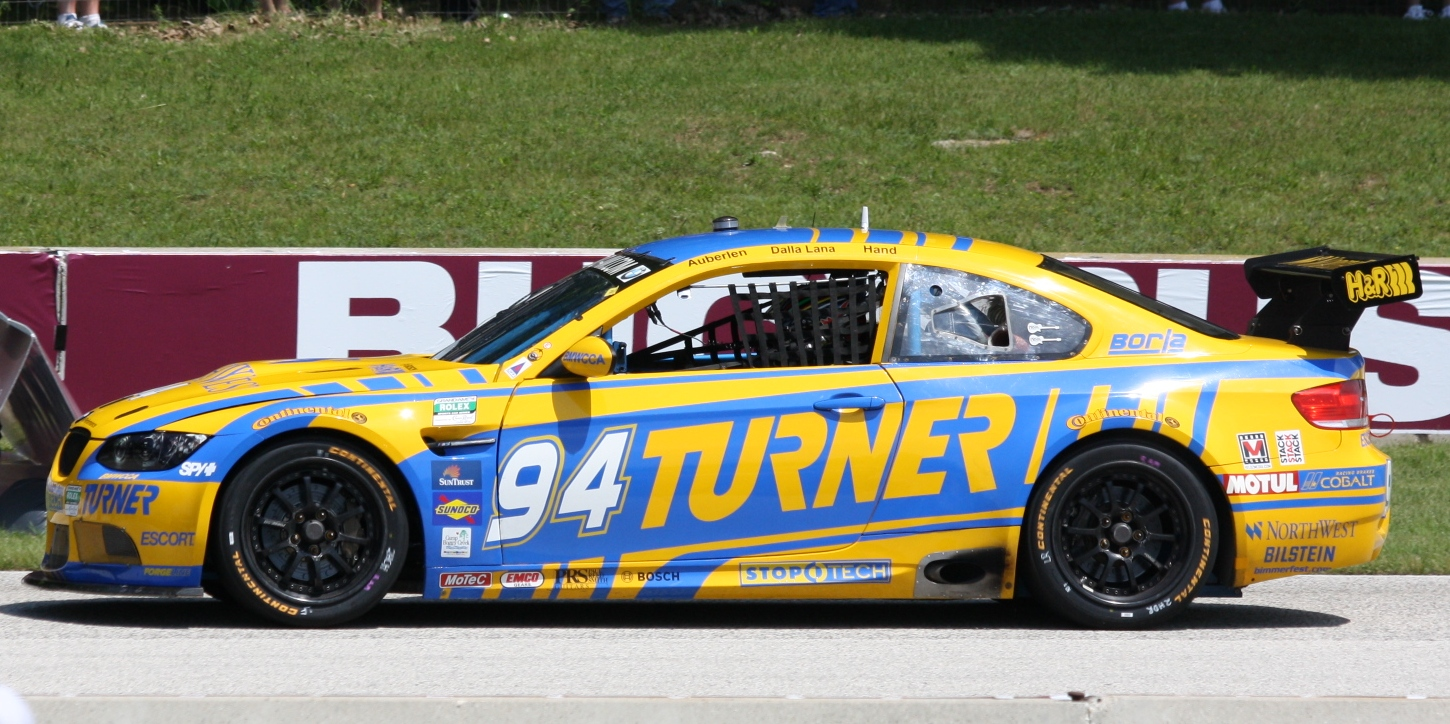
The GT sports car of Bill Auberlen, Paul Dalla Lana, and Joey Hand racing at an event at Road America.

William Anthony Auberlen (born October 12, 1968) is an American factory race car driver known for his affiliation with BMW, driving cars made and run by the famous German marque for a number of years. Auberlen currently competes for Turner Motorsport in the IMSA SportsCar Championship and Michelin Pilot Challenge.

== Motorsports career and affiliation with BMW ==
Auberlen was born in Redondo Beach, California, located in the Los Angeles metropolitan area and attended Rolling Hills High School. His career started in the 1970s in motocross, with Auberlen moving to IMSA GTU in 1987. He stayed there until 1997, his last year resulting in him winning the championship. During his time in the IMSA Series he had also become the 1996 Peruvian Formula Three champion and took part in several Formula Atlantic races.

Auberlen mentioned in a 2020 edition of the Marshall Pruett Podcast that he was in advanced negotiations with Hogan Racing for a drive in the 1998 CART series but chose to pursue an opportunity with BMW instead.

Other competitions Auberlen has competed in during his career include the 24 Hours of Le Mans and the American Le Mans Series (1999-2003), driving a BMW V12 LMR in 1999 and 2000 for Schnitzer Motorsport. During the Petit Le Mans at Road Atlanta in 2000, his BMW did a spectacular back flip over the same hump over which Yannick Dalmas backflipped in a Porsche 911 GT1 in 1998.

Auberlen briefly stepped up to Grand-Am's Daytona Prototype class in 2003, in addition to driving a BMW 325i for Turner Motorsport in World Challenge touring. He won both the 2003 and 2004 Speed World Challenge Touring Car Championship behind the wheel of a Turner Motorsport BMW 325i. By doing so, Auberlen ended an eight-year Honda / Acura domination of the series.

For 2004, Auberlen dedicated himself to the production-based World Challenge GT class for BMW Motorsport's Prototype Technology Group team, earning the series championship for BMW.

In 2005, Auberlen continued to drive for BMW PTG in Grand-Am's GT series, while also driving for Panoz Racing in IMSA's American Le Mans Series.

In 2006, Auberlen once again exclusively drove BMWs — an M3 for Sigalsport's Grand-Am GT team, an M3 for Turner's Grand-Am team and an M3 for BMW PTG's ALMS team.

It is believed that Auberlen has driven BMW cars in more races than any other driver in the world. He has won six professional auto-racing championships, four with BMW power. He has competed in over 500 professional races to date, 339 in BMWs. His results include 91 race victories, 188 podium finishes, 56 pole positions, 83 fastest race laps and 110 records.

For four seasons (2014-2017), Auberlen drove full-time for Rahal Letterman Lanigan Racing in the IMSA GTLM class of the WeatherTech SportsCar Championship; first in a BMW Z4 GTE then BMW M6 GTLM. In November 2017, Auberlen was named a BMW Brand Ambassador, but stepped down as a full-time driver in GTLM for 2018. He continued to compete part-time for RLLR in the endurance races, while driving for Turner Motorsports in the IMSA GTD class in shorter events, driving a BMW M6 GT3.

In 2019, Auberlen returned to full-time competition for BMW, partnering with Robby Foley in the Turner BMW #96 in the GTD class.

== Personal life ==
In addition to his racing success, Auberlen has designed and built fast boats and bikes. Using motorsport technology, he developed X Power Drive, a high-performance boating outdrive, engineered a custom 1554-hp Chevrolet engine that powered his open-bow Carrera catamaran to numerous world speed and acceleration records. He also built a custom turbocharged 420 hp motorcycle.

== Career highlights ==
1987-94 IMSA GTU – eight poles (five record), five wins including pole and win in East-West Challenge 1993 (Fuji, Japan) and 1994 (Autopolis, Japan), 16 podiums including second in 12 Hours of Sebring 1987 and 24 Hours of Daytona 1988, three fastest race laps (one record); co-drove with father Gary 1987 to 1989.

1995 IMSA GTS-2 – second, record seven-consecutive record poles, five wins including 12 Hours of Sebring on 10th anniversary of father Gary's Sebring win, eight podiums and seven record fastest race laps in 11 races; Speedvision Cup – two wins, three podiums, two record fastest race laps; Atlantic Championship – second in series debut, record fastest race lap.

1996 Bill joined BMW Team PTG after his very successful privateer effort. He became the 1996 Peruvian Formula Three champion – four wins, five podiums; IMSA GTS-2 – one record pole, three podiums, one fastest race lap; competed in all three classes at the 12 Hours of Sebring; first WSC start, in Rolex 24 At Daytona

In 1997, Bill was the IMSA GTS-3 champion – six poles (three record), five wins including Rolex 24 At Daytona and 12 Hours of Sebring, eight podiums, three fastest race laps (two record); three WSC starts; Speedvision Cup – one record pole, two podiums; Atlantic Championship podium.

1998 fourth, 24 Heures du Mans GT1; test driver, BMW V8 race engine development; SPORTS CAR – first BMW prototype victory; SPORTS CAR and USRRC GT2 and GT3 – six record poles, seven wins including Rolex 24 At Daytona and 12 Hours of Sebring, two class wins in same race, nine podiums, seven fastest race laps (six record); International Sports Racing Series – two podiums; Won the final IMSA GT Championship race overall at Laguna Seca Raceway

1999 fifth, 24 Heures du Mans Prototype; American Le Mans Series Prototype – three podiums; USRRC GT3 – one record fastest race lap

2000 American Le Mans Series Prototype – two podiums; Grand American Road Racing Association GTU – two wins, two record fastest race laps

2001 American Le Mans Series GT – Petit Le Mans win, one record fastest race lap; Rolex Sports Car Series GT – one overall and GT podium, one record fastest race lap; World Challenge TC – one pole, record 43-place last-to-first victory at Lime Rock Park, one fastest race lap

2002 Rolex Sports Car Series GT co-champion – two poles (one record), five wins, seven podiums, one record fastest race lap; 24 Heures du Mans LMP 900; American Le Mans Series LMP 900 – one podium; Grand-Am Cup GS1 – one podium, one record fastest race lap

2003 World Challenge TC champion – three poles (two record), four wins including three flag-to-flag, record eight podiums, seven fastest race laps (five record), two record race speeds; World Challenge GT – second, four poles (three record), three wins, one flag-to-flag and one last-to-first at Lime Rock Park in heavy rain, four podiums, four fastest race laps (three record), one record race speed; Rolex Sports Car Series DP – one record pole, two podiums, one record fastest race lap; American Le Mans Series LMP 900 – one podium

2003 Grassroots Motorsports Editors' Choice Award.

2004 Rolex Sports Car Series GT champion – five record poles, record eight wins including record six consecutive wins, nine podiums, six fastest race laps (three record), career GT victory record; World Challenge TC champion – three record poles, three wins, five podiums, two record fastest race laps, one record race speed, record career winning percentage; Grand-Am Cup ST – one win; selected as All-American Team member, American Auto Racing Writers and Broadcasters Association

2005 24 Heures du Mans GT2 – qualified third; American Le Mans Series GT – one record pole, one win, two podiums; Rolex Sports Car Series GT – three poles (one record), three wins, five podiums, three fastest race laps (two record); Grand-Am Cup GS – five wins, six podiums, one record fastest race lap; World Challenge TC – one pole, two wins, three podiums, two fastest race laps (one record), one record race speed, series record fifth career win at Lime Rock Park

2006 American Le Mans Series GT2 – three podiums; Rolex Sports Car Series – one DP podium, one GT record fastest race lap; Grand-Am Cup GS – third, two wins, five podiums, two fastest race laps (one record); World Challenge TC – one record pole, one win, one record fastest race lap

2007 American Le Mans Series GT2 – one podium; Rolex Sports Car Series DP – one win; KONI Challenge Series GS – three wins, five podiums, two fastest race laps (one record)

2008 Rolex Sports Car Series DP – two podiums; KONI Sports Car Challenge GS – one pole, one win, four podiums, four fastest race laps

2009 American Le Mans Series GT2 - one win, two podiums; KONI Sports Car Challenge GS – one win, four podiums, one fastest race lap

2010 American Le Mans Series GT – team champion, third in driver points, six podiums including 12 Hours of Sebring; Rolex Sports Car Series GT – one win, two podiums, two fastest race laps(one record); Continental Tire Sports Car Challenge GS – one fastest race lap

2011 American Le Mans Series GT – five podiums, including second, 12 Hours of Sebring; 24H Dubai – fifth, third-fastest race lap; Rolex Sports Car Series GT – two wins, four podiums, one fastest race lap; Continental Tire Sports Car Challenge GS – one win, five podiums, two fastest race laps (one record)

2012 American Le Mans Series GT – one record pole, one win, four podiums, one record fastest race lap; Rolex Sports Car Series GT – two wins, four podiums, two fastest race laps (one record)

2020 WeatherTech Sports Car Championship GTD – 61st career win, surpassing Scott Pruett for most in IMSA history.

== Racing record ==
=== Career summary ===
Season	Series	Team	Races	Wins	Poles	F/Laps	Podiums	Points	Position
1999	American Le Mans Series - LMP	Price & Bscher	1	0			0		
1999	American Le Mans Series - LMP	BMW Motorsport	6	0			3		
2000	American Le Mans Series - LMP	BMW Motorsport	11	0			2		
2000	American Le Mans Series - GT	Prototype Technology Group	1	0			0		
2001	American Le Mans Series - GT	Prototype Technology Group	6	1			1		
2002	American Le Mans Series - LMP900	Panoz Motor Sports	10	0			1		
2003	American Le Mans Series - LMP900	Doran Lista Racing	1	0			1		
2003	American Le Mans Series - GTS	Team Olive Garden	1	0			0		
2003	American Le Mans Series - GT	Alegra Motorsports	1	0			0		
2003	American Le Mans Series - GT	Prototype Technology Group (PTG)	1	0			0		
2005	American Le Mans Series - GT2	Panoz Motor Sports	8	1			2		
2006	American Le Mans Series - GT2	BMW Team PTG	10	0			3	84	7th
2007	American Le Mans Series - GT2	Panoz Team PTG	12	0			1	47	22nd
2009	American Le Mans Series - GT2	BMW Rahal Letterman Racing	10	1			2	44	20th
2010	American Le Mans Series - GT2	BMW Rahal Letterman Racing	9	0			6	125	**3rd**
2011	American Le Mans Series - GT	BMW Team RLL	9	0			3	129	**3rd**
2012	American Le Mans Series - GT	BMW Team RLL	10	1			4	107	6th
2013	American Le Mans Series - GT	BMW Team RLL	10	1			3	102	4th
2014	United SportsCar Championship - GTLM	BMW Team RLL	11	0			3	298	8th
2015	United SportsCar Championship - GTLM	BMW Team RLL	10	2			4	305	**2nd**
2016	IMSA SportsCar Championship - GTLM	BMW Team RLL	11	0	2	0	2	298	7th
2017	IMSA SportsCar Championship - GTLM	BMW Team RLL	11	3	0	0	4	317	**2nd**
2018	IMSA SportsCar Championship - GTLM	BMW Team RLL	4	0	0	0	1	106	9th
2018	IMSA SportsCar Championship - GTD	Turner Motorsport	6	0	0	0	0	131	15th
2019	IMSA SportsCar Championship - GTD	Turner Motorsport	11	2	0	0	5	262	**2nd**
2020	IMSA SportsCar Championship - GTD	Turner Motorsport	10	2	0	0	4	236	10th
2021	IMSA SportsCar Championship - GTD	Turner Motorsport	12	2	1	0	3	2880	5th
2021	24H GT Series - P4	BMW M Motorsport	1	1	0	1	1	N/A	N/A
2022	IMSA SportsCar Championship - GTD	Turner Motorsport	12	1	0	0	4	2785	4th
2023	IMSA SportsCar Championship - GTD Pro	Turner Motorsport	3	0	0	0	0	773	11th
2023	IMSA SportsCar Championship - GTD	Turner Motorsport	8	0	0	0	1	2175	15th
2024	GT World Challenge America - Pro	ST Racing	13	0	0	1	6	190	4th
2025	GT World Challenge America - Pro	Random Vandals Racing							
2026	Michelin Pilot Challenge - GS	ST Racing by Random Vandals Racing							

=== 24 Hours of Daytona results ===
Year	Team	Co-drivers	Car	Class	Laps	Pos.	Class Pos.
1987	(United States) SP Racing	(United States) Karl Durkheimer (United States) Dieter Oest (United States) Gary Auberlen	Porsche 911 Carrera	GTU	87	DNF	DNF
1988	(United States) SP Racing	(United States) Gary Auberlen (United States) Adrian Gang (United States) Cary Eisenlohr	Porsche 911 Carrera	GTU	586	17th	**2nd**
1989	(United States) SP Racing	(United States) Gary Auberlen (United States) Cary Eisenlohr (United States) Monte Shelton	Porsche 911 Carrera	GTU	351	DNF	DNF
1990	(United States) SP Racing	(United States) Nort Northam (United States) Cary Eisenlohr (United States) Gary Auberlen	Porsche 911 Carrera RSR	GTU	-	DNS	DNS
1993	(United States) Charles Wagner	(United States) Mike Graham (United States) Dave Russell	Mazda MX-6	GTU	430	34th	7th
1994	(United States) Bill Auberlen	(United States) Les Lindley (United States) Ron Finger (United States) Mike Sheehan	Mazda RX-7	GTU	462	26th	12th
1995	(United States) Daytona Racing	(Germany) Wolfgang Land (Germany) Arnold Mattschull (Germany) Alexander Mattschull (United States) Ron Finger	Porsche 993 Carrera RSR	GTS-2	587	DNF	DNF
1996	(United States) Support Net Racing	(United States) Henry Camferdam (United States) Roger Mandeville (United States) Tony Kester	Hawk C-8-Chevrolet	WSC	466	DNF	DNF
1997	(United States) Prototype Technology Group	(Costa Rica) Javier Quiros (United States) Derek Hill (United States) Boris Said (United States) Tom Hessert	BMW M3	GTS-3	640	9th	**1st**
1998	(United States) Prototype Technology Group	(Belgium) Marc Duez (United States) Boris Said (United States) Peter Cunningham	BMW M3	GT3	657	6th	**1st**
1999	(United States) Prototype Technology Group	(United States) Brian Cunningham (United States) Johannes van Overbeek (Germany) Hans-Joachim Stuck	BMW M3	GT3	238	DNF	DNF
2000	(United States) Genesis Racing	(United States) Rick Fairbanks (United States) Nick Ham (United States) Chris Gleason	BMW M3	GTU	312	DNF	DNF
2001	(United States) Genesis Racing	(United States) Chris Gleason (United States) Rick Fairbanks (United States) Chris Miller	BMW M3 E46	GT	627	9th	6th
2002	(United States) Scuderia Ferrari of Washington	(United States) Cort Wagner (Italy) Constantino Bertuzzi (United States) Derrike Cope	Ferrari 360 Modena N-GT	GT	572	25th	14th
2004	(United States) Prototype Technology Group	(Sweden) Niclas Jönsson (United States) Joey Hand (United States) Boris Said (United States) Justin Marks	BMW M3 E46	GT	267	DNF	DNF
2004	(United States) Prototype Technology Group	(Sweden) Niclas Jönsson (United States) Joey Hand (United States) Boris Said (United States) Justin Marks	BMW M3 E46	GT	162	DNF	DNF
2005	(United States) Prototype Technology Group	(United States) Joey Hand (United Kingdom) Ian James (United States) Chris Gleason	BMW M3 E46	GT	199	DNF	DNF
2006	(United States) Sigalsport BMW	(Spain) Matthew Alhadeff (United States) Tommy Milner (United States) Justin Marks (United States) Gene Sigal	BMW M3 E46	GT	592	31st	16th
2007	(United States) Luggage Express Team Sigalsport BMW	(Spain) Matthew Alhadeff (United States) Gene Sigal (Austria) Karl Wendlinger	Riley Mk. XI-BMW	DP	367	DNF	DNF
2008	(United States) Alex Job Racing	(United States) Joey Hand (United States) Patrick Long (United Kingdom) Andy Wallace	Crawford DP08-Porsche	DP	569	DNF	DNF
2010	(United States) Turner Motorsport	(Canada) Paul Dalla Lana (United States) Joey Hand (United States) Boris Said	BMW M6	GT	675	15th	8th
2011	(United States) Turner Motorsport	(United States) Boris Said (Canada) Paul Dalla Lana (United States) Matt Plumb	BMW M6	GT	565	32nd	17th
2012	(United States) Turner Motorsport	(United States) Michael Marsal (Germany) Dirk Werner (Canada) Paul Dalla Lana (Germany) Dirk Müller	BMW M3	GT	691	27th	16th
2012	(United States) Turner Motorsport	(Canada) Paul Dalla Lana (Germany) Dirk Müller (United States) Boris Said (United States) Billy Johnson	BMW M3	GT	86	DNF	DNF
2013	(United States) Turner Motorsport	(United States) Billy Johnson (Canada) Paul Dalla Lana (United States) Boris Said (Belgium) Maxime Martin	BMW M3	GT	631	28th	18th
2013	(United States) Turner Motorsport	(Belgium) Maxime Martin (United States) Michael Marsal (United Kingdom) Andy Priaulx (United States) Gunter Schaldach	BMW M3	GT	-	DNS	DNS
2014	(United States) BMW Team RLL	(United States) Joey Hand (United Kingdom) Andy Priaulx (Belgium) Maxime Martin	BMW Z4 GTE	GTLM	679	7th	**2nd**
2015	(United States) BMW Team RLL	(Germany) Dirk Werner (Brazil) Augusto Farfus (Canada) Bruno Spengler	BMW Z4 GTE	GTLM	725	5th	**2nd**
2016	(United States) BMW Team RLL	(Germany) Dirk Werner (Brazil) Augusto Farfus (Canada) Bruno Spengler	BMW M6 GTLM	GTLM	721	11th	5th
2016	(United States) BMW Team RLL	(Germany) Dirk Werner (Brazil) Augusto Farfus (Canada) Bruno Spengler	BMW M6 GTLM	GTLM	721	11th	5th
2017	(United States) BMW Team RLL	(United Kingdom) Alexander Sims (Brazil) Augusto Farfus (Canada) Bruno Spengler	BMW M6 GTLM	GTLM	651	12th	8th
2018	(United States) BMW Team RLL	(United States) Connor De Phillippi (Austria) Philipp Eng (United Kingdom) Alexander Sims	BMW M8 GTE	GTLM	731	35th	9th
2019	(United States) Turner Motorsport	(United States) Robby Foley (United States) Dillon Machavern (Germany) Jens Klingmann	BMW M6 GT3	GTD	560	26th	10th
2020	(United States) Turner Motorsport	(United States) Robby Foley (Germany) Jens Klingmann (United States) Dillon Machavern	BMW M6 GT3	GTD	763	23rd	6th
2021	(United States) Turner Motorsport	(United States) Robby Foley (United States) Colton Herta (Australia) Aidan Read	BMW M6 GT3	GTD	744	27th	6th
2022	(United States) Turner Motorsport	(United States) Robby Foley (United States) Michael Dinan (Germany) Jens Klingmann	BMW M4 GT3	GTD	280	DNF	DNF
2023	(United States) Turner Motorsport	(United States) John Edwards (United States) Chandler Hull (Canada) Bruno Spengler	BMW M4 GT3	GTD Pro	635	DNF	DNF

=== 24 Hours of Le Mans results ===
Year	Team	Co-Drivers	Car	Class	Laps	Pos.	Class Pos.
1998	(United Kingdom) Gulf Team Davidoff (United Kingdom) EMKA Racing	(United Kingdom) Steve O'Rourke (United Kingdom) Tim Sugden	McLaren F1 GTR	GT1	343	4th	4th
1999	(United Kingdom) Price+Bscher	(Germany) Thomas Bscher (United Kingdom) Steve Soper	BMW V12 LM	LMP	345	5th	4th
2002	(United States) Panoz Motor Sports	(United States) David Donohue (United States) Gunnar Jeannette	Panoz LMP01 Evo-Élan	LMP900	230	DNF	DNF
2005	(United States) Panoz Motor Sports	(United Kingdom) Robin Liddell (Canada) Scott Maxwell	Panoz Esperante GT-LM	GT2	27	DNF	DNF
2013	(United Kingdom) Aston Martin Racing	(Canada) Paul Dalla Lana (Portugal) Pedro Lamy	Aston Martin Vantage GTE	GTE; Pro	221	DNF	DNF

=== American Le Mans Series results ===
(key) (Races in bold indicate pole position; results in italics indicate fastest lap)

Year	Team	Class	Make	Engine	1	2	3	4	5	6	7	8	9	10	11	12	Pos.	Points	Ref
1999	Price & Bscher	LMP	BMW V12 LM	BMW S70 6.0 L V12	SEB; DNF														
1999	BMW Motorsport	LMP	BMW V12 LMR	BMW S70 6.0 L V12		ATL	MOS; DNS	SON; 5	POR; 4	PET; 2	MON; 3	LSV; 2							
2000	BMW Motorsport	LMP	BMW V12 LMR	BMW S70 6.0 L V12	SEB; 4	CHA; 4	SIL; DNF	NÜR; 9	SON; 4	MOS; 3	TEX; 5	ROS; 10	PET; DNF	MON; 4	LSV; 3				
2000	Prototype Technology Group	GT	BMW M3 GTR	BMW 3.2L I6												ADE; 4			
2001	Prototype Technology Group	GT	BMW M3 GTR	BMW 4.0L V8	TEX; 7	SEB; DNF	DON	JAR	SON; 4	POR; 8†	MOS	MID	MON; 4	PET; 1					
2002	Panoz Motor Sports	LMP900	Panoz LMP01 Evo	Élan 6L8 6.0L V8	SEB; 7	SON; 3	MID; 4	AME; DNF	WAS; 6	TRO; 4	MOS; 5	MON; 6	MIA; 8	PET; 5					
2003	Doran Lista Racing	LMP900	Dallara SP1	Judd GV5 5.0L V10	SEB	ATL	SON; 3	TRO	MOS	AME									
2003	Team Olive Garden	GTS	Ferrari 550 Maranello	Ferrari 6.0L V12							MON; 4								
2003	Alegra Motorsports	GT	BMW M3	BMW 3.2L I6								MIA; DNF							
2003	Prototype Technology Group (PTG)	GT	BMW M3 GTR	BMW 3.2L I6									PET; 6						
2005	Panoz Motor Sports	GT2	Panoz Esperante GT-LM	Ford (Élan) 5.0L V8	SEB; DNF	ATL; 1	MID	LIM; 8	SON; 5	POR	AME; 5	MOS; 8†	PET; 9	MON; 2					
2006	BMW Team PTG	GT2	BMW M3	BMW 3.4L I6	SEB; DNF	TEX; DNF	MID; 4	LIM; 3	UTA; 6	POR; 3	AME; 2	MOS; 5	PET; 6	MON; 8†			7th	84	
2007	Panoz Team PTG	GT2	Panoz Esperante GT-LM	Ford (Élan) 5.0L V8	SEB; DNF	STP; 3	LNB; 5	TEX; DNF	UTA; DNF	LIM; 8	MID; DNF	AME; 10†	MOS; DNF	DET; 7	PET; 7	MON; 6	22nd	47	
2009	BMW Rahal Letterman Racing	GT2	BMW M3 GT2	BMW 4.0 L V8	SEB; DNF	STP; DNF	LBH; 8	UTA; 8	LRP; 3	MDO; 8	ELK; 1	MOS; 9	PET; 12	LAG; DNF			20th	44	
2010	BMW Rahal Letterman Racing	GT	BMW M3 GT2	BMW 4.0 L V8	SEB; 2	LBH; 3	LAG; 8	UTA; 2	LRP; 2	MDO; 3	ELK; DNF	MOS; 3	PET; 4				3rd	125	
2011	BMW Team RLL	GT	BMW M3 GT2	BMW 4.0 L V8	SEB; 2	LBH; 7	LRP; 8	MOS; 5	MDO; 5	ELK; 2	**BAL**; **5**	LAG; 4	PET; 2				3rd	129	
2012	BMW Team RLL	GT	BMW M3 GT2	BMW 4.0 L V8	SEB; 4	LBH; 10	LAG; 3	**LRP**; **6**	MOS; 7	MDO; 3	ELK; 1	BAL; 8	VIR; 4	PET; 3			6th	107	
2013	BMW Team RLL	GT	BMW Z4 GTE	BMW 4.4 L V8	SEB; 4	LBH; 1	LAG; DNF	LRP; 4	MOS; 6	ELK; 7	BAL; 4	COA; 4	VIR; 5	PET; 2			4th	102	

^{†} Did not finish the race but was classified as his car completed more than 70% of the overall winner's race distance.

=== WeatherTech SportsCar Championship results ===
(key) (Races in bold indicate pole position; results in italics indicate fastest lap)

Year	Team	Class	Make	Engine	1	2	3	4	5	6	7	8	9	10	11	12	Pos.	Points	Ref
2014	BMW Team RLL	GTLM	BMW Z4 GTE	BMW 4.4 L V8	DAY; 2	SEB; 3	LBH; 6	LGA; 2	**WGL**; 10	MOS; 6	IMS; 6	ELK; 8	VIR; 4	COA; 6	PET; 10		8th	298	
2015	BMW Team RLL	GTLM	BMW Z4 GTE	BMW 4.4 L V8	DAY; 2	SEB; 8	**LBGP**; **1**	**LGA**; **2**	WGL; 3	MOS; 4	ELK; 5	VIR; 5	AUS; 1	PET; 4			2nd	305	
2016	BMW Team RLL	GTLM	BMW M6 GTLM	BMW S63 4.4 L Twin Turbo V8	DAY; 5	**SEB**; **2**	**LBH**; **5**	LGA; 9	WGL; 3	MOS; 4	LIM; 7	ELK; 8	VIR; 5	AUS; 4	PET; 9		7th	298	
2017	BMW Team RLL	GTLM	BMW M6 GTLM	BMW 4.4 L Turbo V8	DAY; 8	SEB; 6	LBH; 4	AUS; 2	WGL; 1	MOS; 1	LIM; 6	ELK; 6	VIR; 4	LGA; 8	PET; 1		2nd	317	
2018	BMW Team RLL	GTLM	BMW M8 GTE	BMW S63 4.0 L Twin-turbo V8	DAY; 9	**SEB**; 2	LBH	MOH	WGL; 7	MOS	LIM	ELK	VIR	LGA	PET; 4		9th	106	
2018	Turner Motorsport	GTD	BMW M6 GT3	BMW 4.4 L Turbo V8	DAY	SEB	MOH; 6	BEL; 7	WGL	MOS; 11	LIM; 10	ELK	VIR; 10	LGA; 12	PET		15th	131	
2019	Turner Motorsport	GTD	BMW M6 GT3	BMW 4.4 L Turbo V8	DAY; 9	SEB; 13	MDO; 15	DET; 10	WGL; 2	**MOS**; 1	LIM; 3	ELK; 3	VIR; 11	LGA; 7	PET; 1		2nd	262	
2020	Turner Motorsport	GTD	BMW M6 GT3	BMW 4.4 L Turbo V8	DAY; 6	DAY; 8	SEB; 3	ELK; 7	VIR; 1	ATL; 11	MDO; 11	CLT; 1	PET; 9	LGA; 2	SEB		10th	236	
2021	Turner Motorsport	GTD	BMW M6 GT3	BMW 4.4 L Turbo V8	**DAY**; 6	SEB; 8	MDO; 1	DET; 8	WGL; 1	WGL; 12	LIM; 5	ELK; 2	LGA; 4	LBH; 16	**VIR**; 12	PET; 10	5th	2880	
2022	Turner Motorsport	GTD	BMW M4 GT3	BMW S58B30T0 3.0 L Twin Turbo I6	DAY; 18	SEB; 4	LBH; 4	LGA; 3	MDO; 1	DET; 8	WGL; 3	MOS; 4	LIM; 10	**ELK**; **10**	VIR; 7	PET; 3	4th	2785	
2023	Turner Motorsport	GTD Pro	BMW M4 GT3	BMW S58B30T0 3.0 L Turbo I6	DAY; 9	SEB; 7			WGL; 7								11th	773	
2023	Turner Motorsport	GTD	BMW M4 GT3	BMW S58B30T0 3.0 L Turbo I6			LBH; 11	MON; 2		MOS; 5	LIM; 11	ELK; 6	VIR; 4	IMS; 7	PET; 7		15th	2175	

=== Complete FIA World Endurance Championship results ===
(key) (Races in bold indicate pole position) (Races in italics indicate fastest lap)

Year	Entrant	Class	Car	Engine	1	2	3	4	5	6	7	8	Rank	Pts
2013	Aston Martin Racing	LMGTE Pro	Aston Martin Vantage GTE	Aston Martin 4.5 L V8	SIL	SPA	LMS; Ret	SÃO	COA	FUJ	SHA	BHR	45th	0
