= Classic Motorsports Mitty =

The Classic Motorsports Mitty is a classic automobile race and event held annually at the Road Atlanta race track in Braselton, Georgia. Since the inaugural event in 1977 it has grown to become one of the largest classic automobile events on the East Coast of the United States.

== A brief history of The Mitty ==
The Mitty began in 1977 with a handful of Atlanta-area road racing enthusiasts who were looking for a safe place to exercise their cars at speed. Road Atlanta offered just the venue.

The formula was an immediate success. After observing the enthusiasm for that first event, Martha Turner, then editor of the Jaguar Marque, dubbed the proceedings the great Walter Mitty Challenge after the James Thurber short story.

Through the years, The Mitty has become a spring tradition in Atlanta. In 2004 Classic Motorsports magazine became the title sponsor and event co-promoter. The event is currently presented by Hagerty and sanctioned by Historic Sportscar Racing, an East Coast-based racing series that developed from the first Mitty and now sanctions six to 10 events each year.

== See also ==
- Historic motorsport
- Vintage racing
- Historic Sportscar Racing
