= BMW 3 Series =

Compact executive car

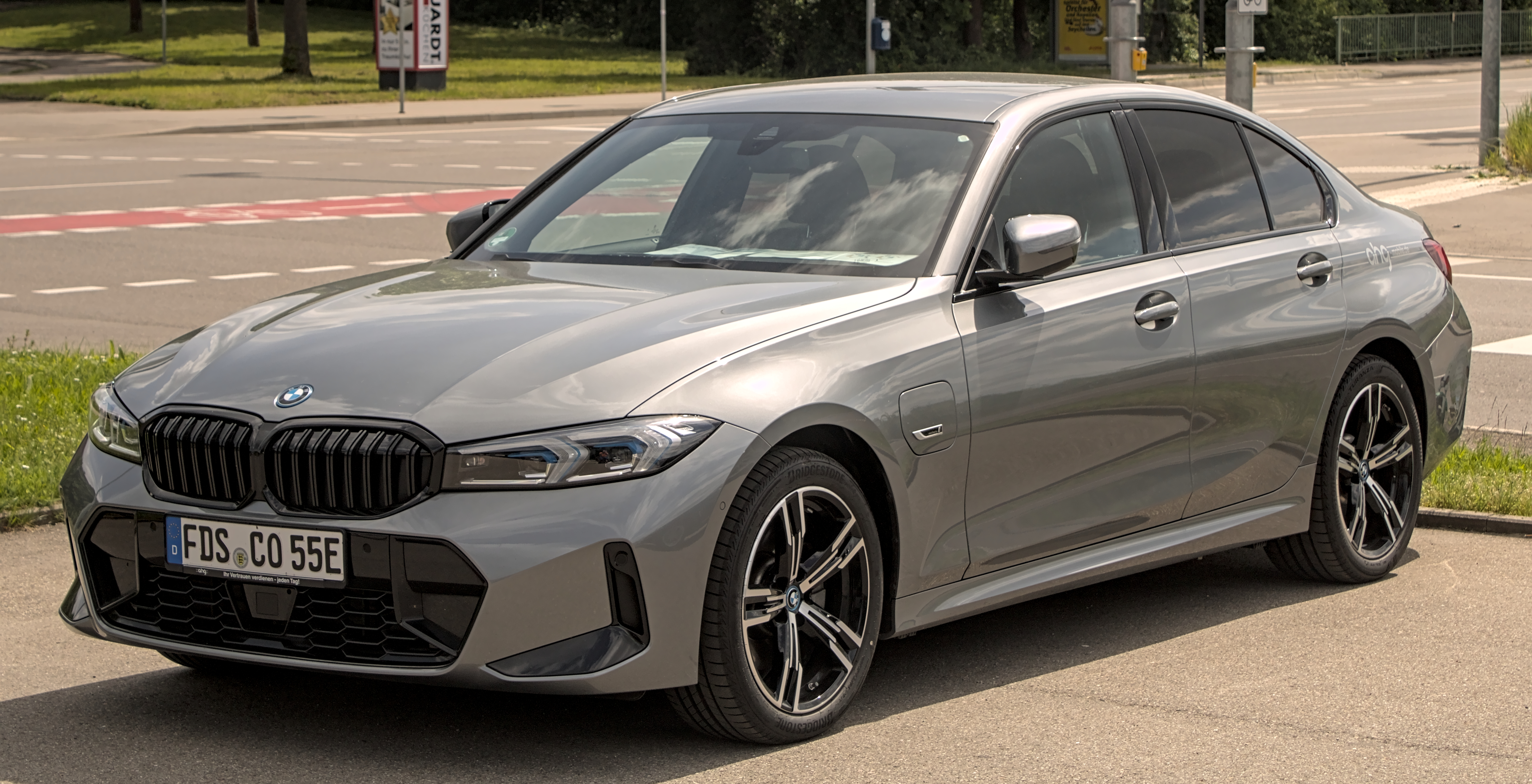
- G20 LCI

Overview
- Manufacturer: BMW
- Production: 1975–present

Body and chassis
- Class: Compact executive car (D)

Chronology
- Predecessor: BMW 02 Series

The BMW 3 series is a line of compact executive cars manufactured by the German automaker BMW since May 1975. It is the successor to the 02 series and has been produced in eight generations.

The first generation of the 3 Series was only available as a 2-door saloon; the model range expanded to include a range of body styles - a 4-door saloon, 2-door convertible, 2-door coupé, 5-door estate, 5-door liftback ("Gran Turismo"; discontinued in 2019) and 3-door hatchback (named "Compact"). Since 2004, the Compact has been spun off and became the 1 Series. In 2013, both the coupé and convertible models have been marketed as the 4 Series. All three of these styles are no longer included in the 3 Series.

The 3 Series is BMW's best-selling model line, accounting for around 30% of the BMW brand's annual total car sales, and has won numerous awards throughout its history. The M version of the 3 series, M3, debuted with the second generation 3 Series (E30 M3) in 1986.

== First generation (E21; 1975) ==
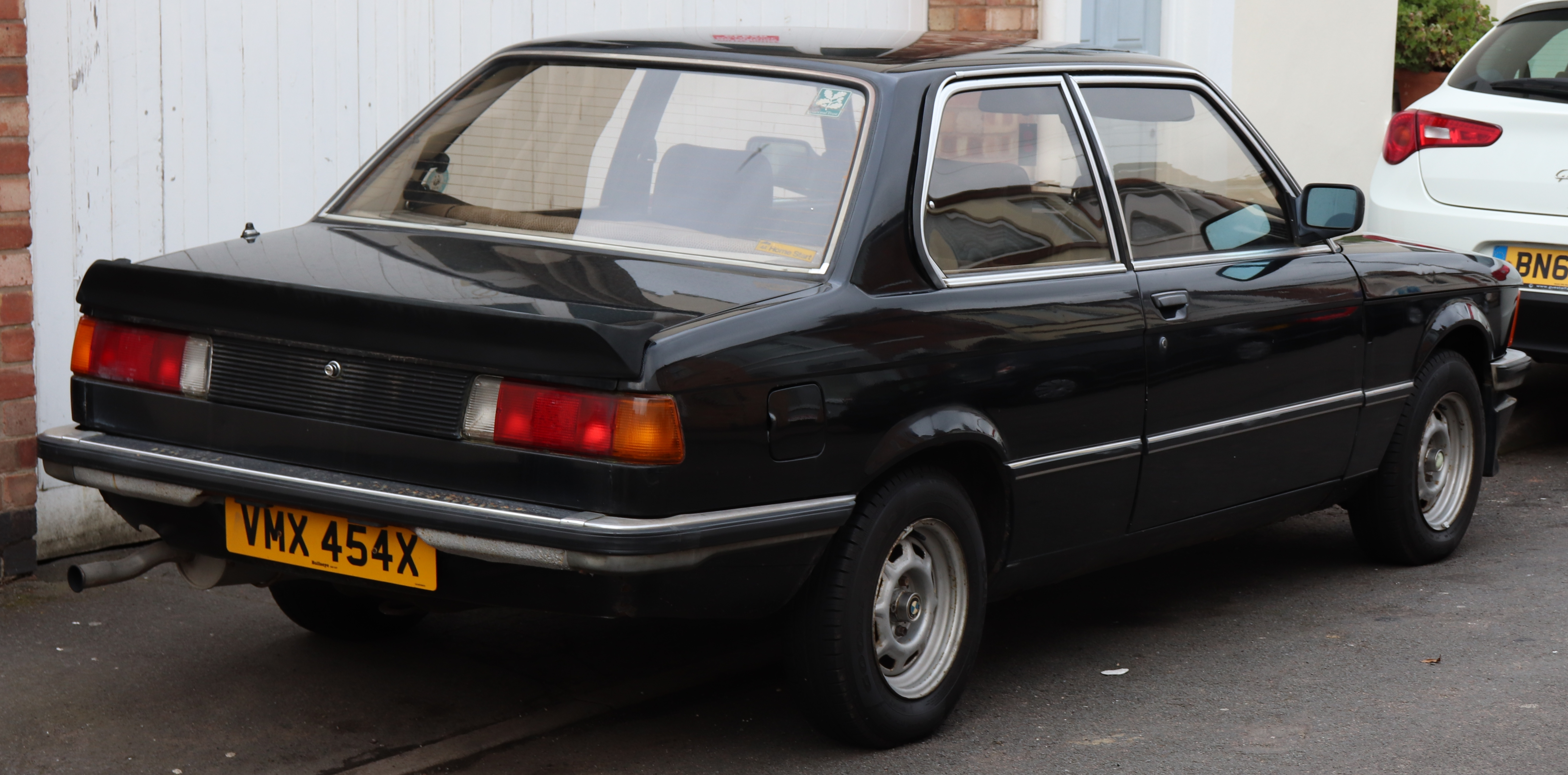
E21 (rear)

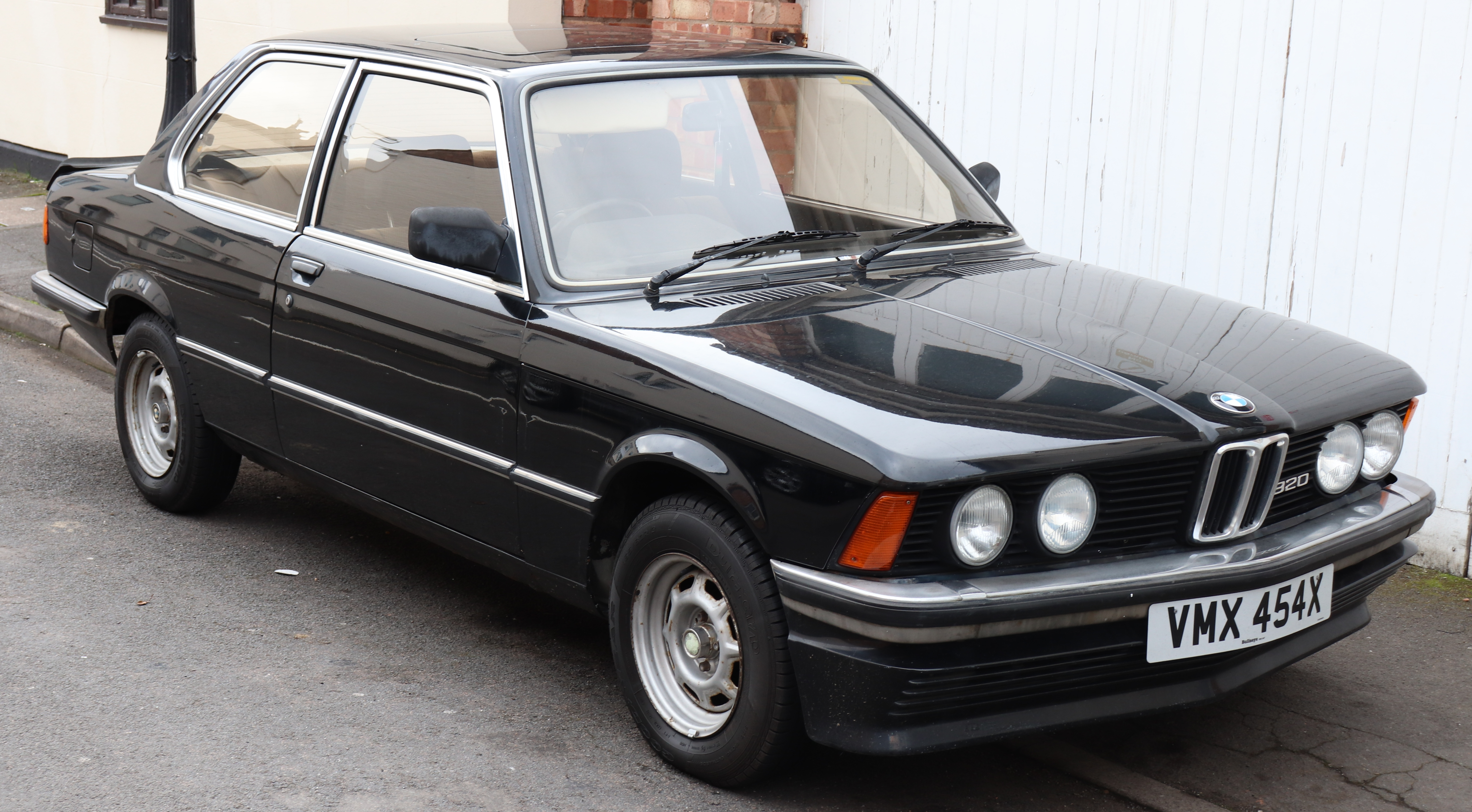
E21 (front)

The E21 was launched in 1975 and replaced the 02 Series, borrowing the naming convention first introduced with the first generation E12 5 Series. The body style was designed by Paul Bracq and was initially available as a 2-door saloon (also described as coupé), with a convertible version made available through collaboration with Karosserie Baur.

At launch, all models used carburetted 4-cylinder M10 engines; with fuel-injected models introduced in late 1975 and 6-cylinder engines powered by the all-new M20 were added in 1977; which were unavailable in the North American market. Three transmission types were available; a 3 speed automatic and a 4 or 5 speed manual gearbox.

The E21 was discontinued in December of 1983 with the release of the E30.

== Second generation (E30; 1982) ==
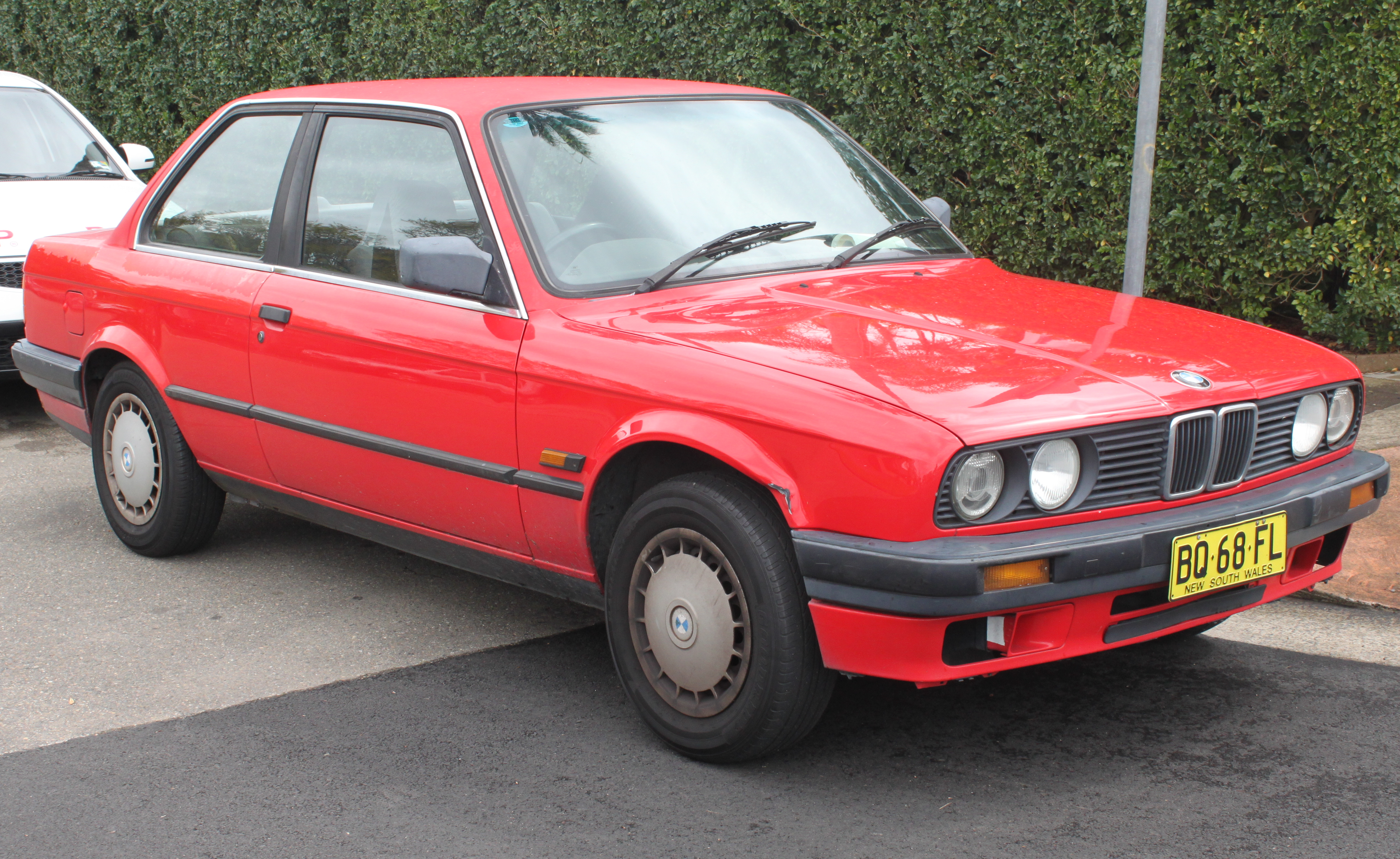
E30 saloon

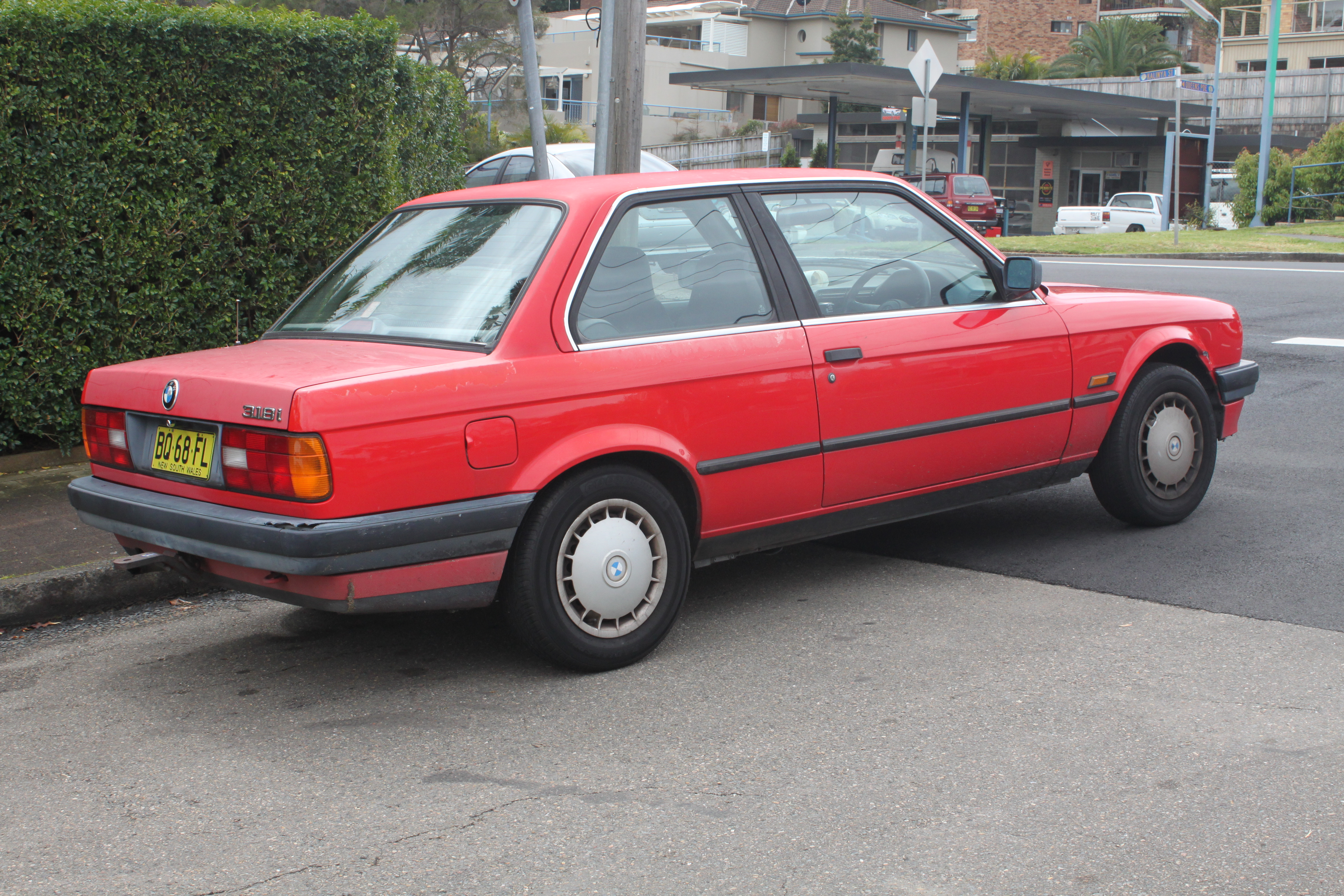
E30 saloon

On its introduction in 1982, the E30 was produced solely as a 2-door sedan. Four-door sedan models were introduced in 1983, convertibles were introduced in 1985 and estate ("Touring") models were introduced in 1987.

The E30 was the first 3 Series to be available in wagon and 4-door sedan body styles. It was also the first 3 Series to offer a diesel engine, and all-wheel drive was introduced to the 3 Series range with the 325iX model. The E30 reused the M10 and M20 engines from the E21, albeit with many models now receiving fuel-injection. A diesel was also introduced to the 3 Series with the M21 with a turbocharged variant, making it also the first turbocharged 3 Series. The BMW Z1 roadster was based on the E30 platform, and features of the rear suspension would be reused in the E36 'Compact' and Z3.

The first BMW M3 was built on the E30 platform. The E30 M3 is powered by the high-revving S14 four-cylinder petrol engine, which produced 175 kW (235 hp) in its final European-only iteration.

The E30 was slowly phased out starting in 1990 with the release of the E36, but Convertible and Touring models continued to be manufactured until 1993 and 1994 respectively. This also marked the end of production of the M20 engine.

== Third generation (E36; 1990) ==
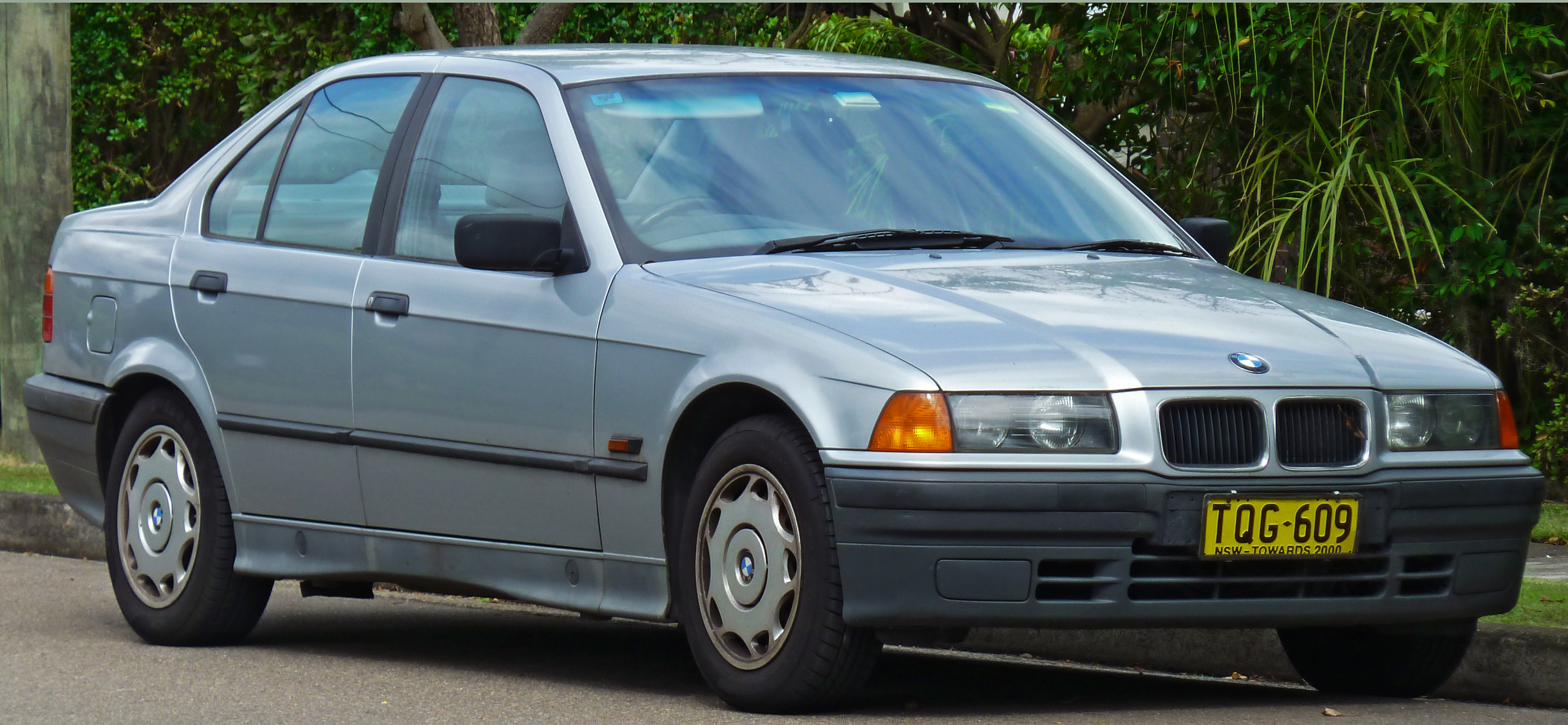
E36 sedan

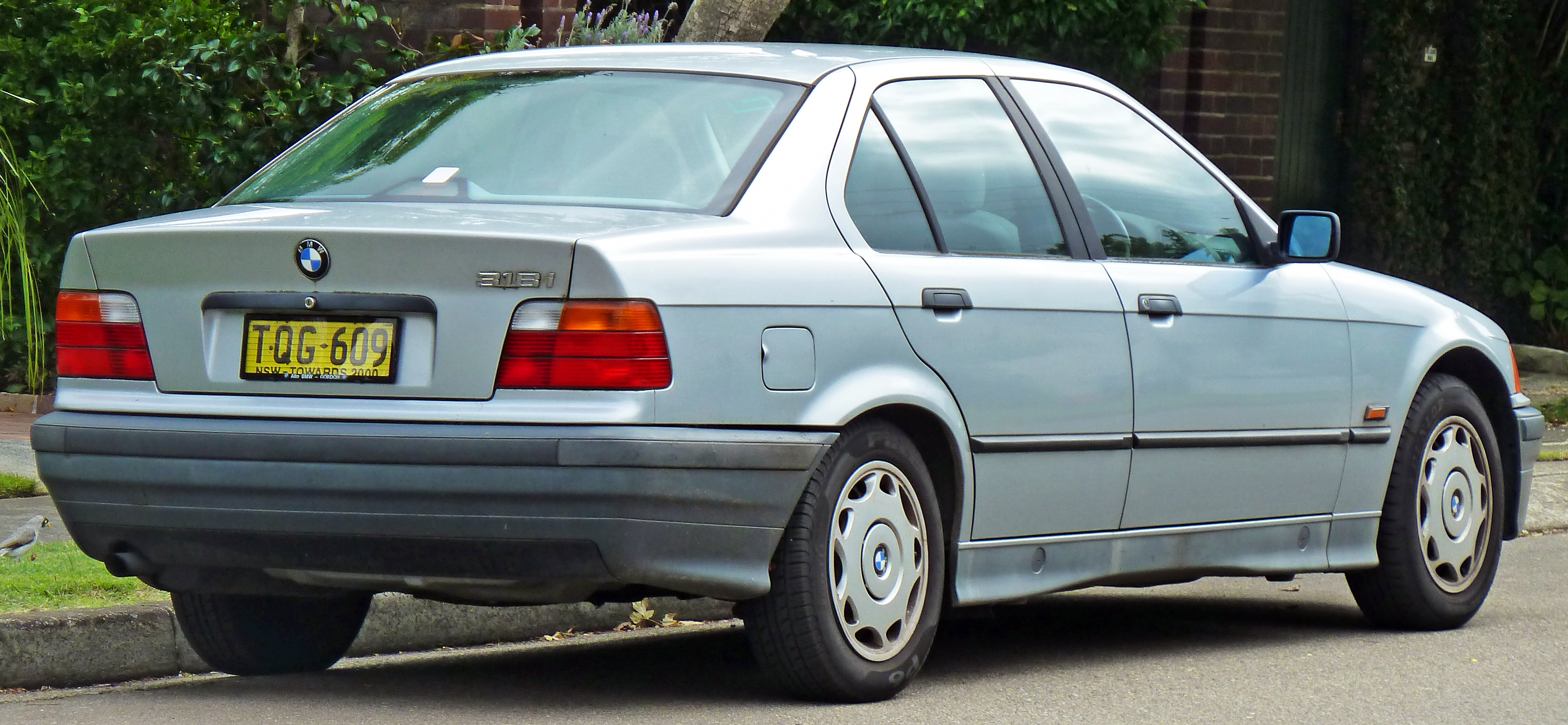
E36 sedan

The E36 arrived in 1990 and was sold in an enlarged variety of models: a sedan, coupé, convertible, wagon (marketed as "Touring"), and hatchback (marketed as a "Compact").

The E36 was the first 3 Series to be offered a 6-speed manual transmission (in the 1996 M3), a 5-speed automatic transmission, a four-cylinder diesel engine and to be available with stability control (ASC). The E36 was also the first of only two generations to be sold with the Compact nameplate. The multi-link rear suspension (dubbed Z-Axle) that was first seen on the Z1 was introduced to the 3 Series and was a significant upgrade compared to previous generations.

The M3 model is powered by the S50 and S52 straight-six engines. It was sold in coupé, sedan and convertible body styles; with a one-off concept 'M3 Compact' variant also built. The BMW Z3 Roadster and Coupé models were also based on the E36 platform.

The E36 was phased out starting with the 4-door sedan 1998 with the release of the E46, but other models continued to be made through 1999 and Compact models continued to be manufactured until 2000.

== Fourth generation (E46; 1998) ==
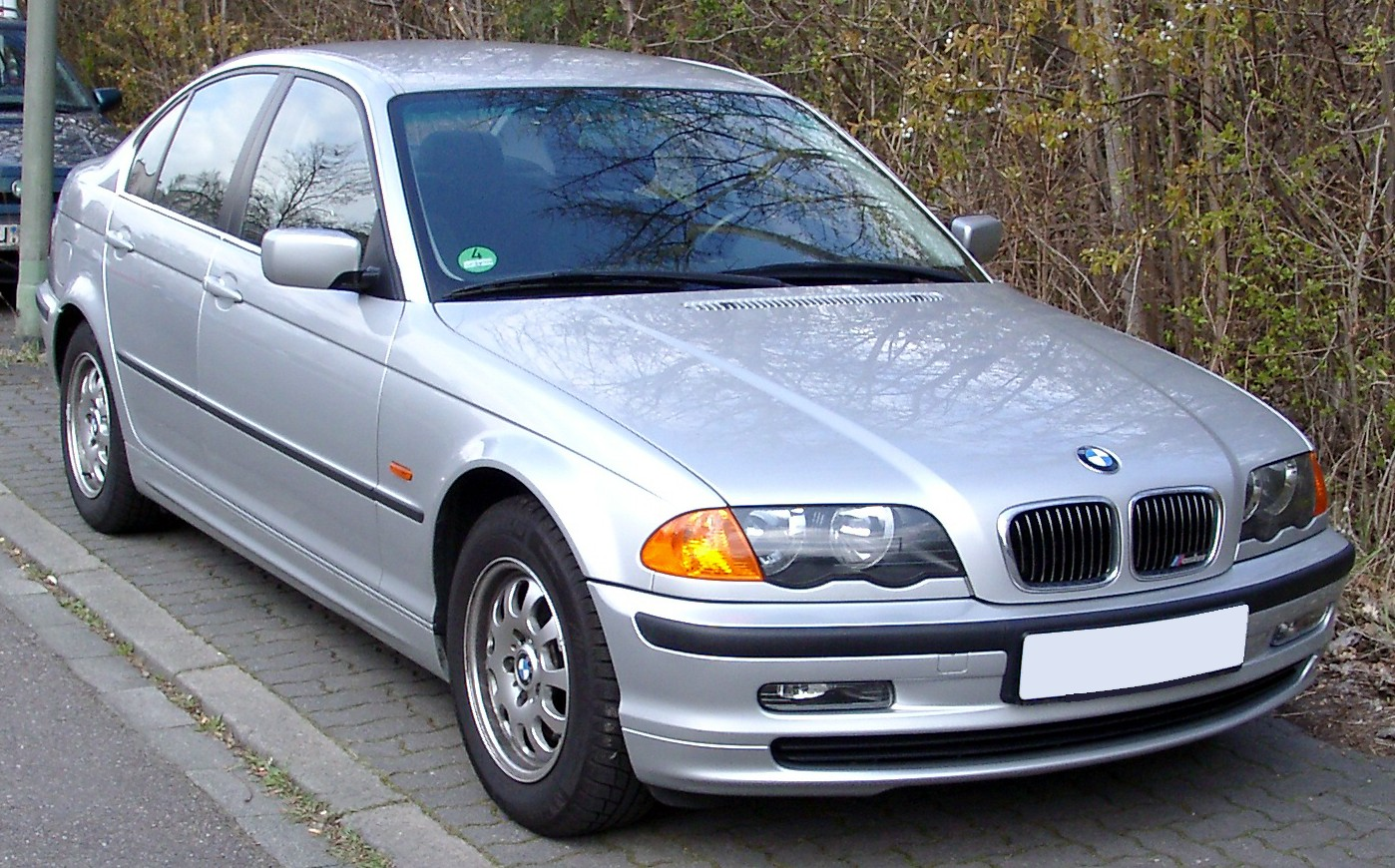
E46 sedan

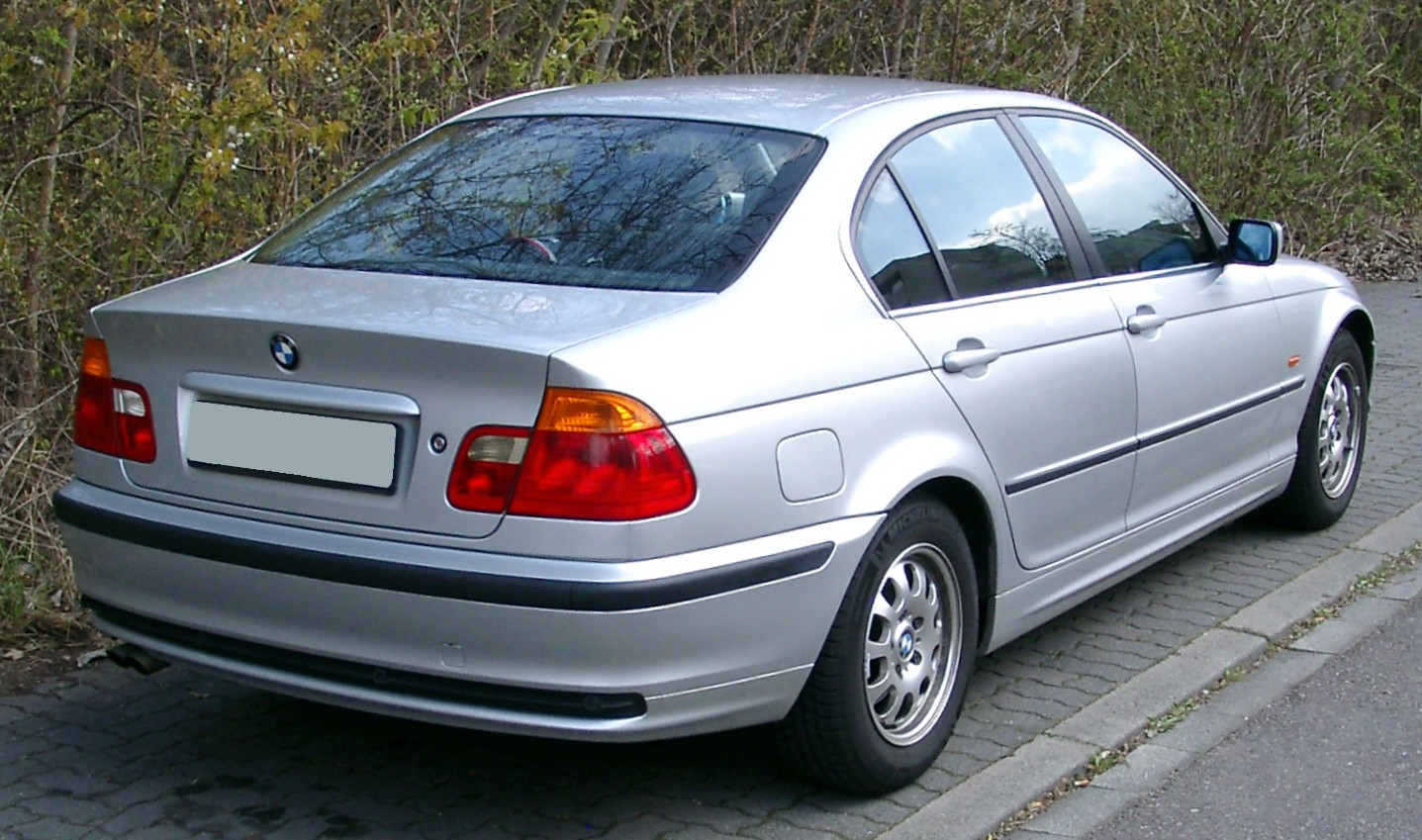
E46 sedan

At the turn of 1998, the E46 was launched as a sedan, with later coupé, convertible, wagon (marketed as "Touring"), and hatchback (marketed as "3 Series Compact") models being added.

The E46 generation introduced various electronic features to the 3 Series, including the CANBUS protocol, satellite navigation, DSC, rain-sensing wipers, LED tail-lights, and Xenon headlights. All-wheel drive, last available in the E30 3 Series, was reintroduced for the E46 as the 325xi and 330xi sedan/wagon models. For the first time since the introduction of the 3 Series, North American markets did not receive 4-cylinder or diesel E46 models. The E46 has the widest range of transmission options; ranging from 4, 5 or 6 speed automatics, a 5 or 6 speed manual and an automatically-actuated 6-speed sequential manual gearbox (dubbed 'SMG').

The E46 was the last of two generations of 3 Series available with a Compact variant. The M3 version of the E46 was powered by the S54 straight-six engine and was available in coupé and convertible body styles, with a one-off concept 'M3 Touring' variant also built. The transmissions available were a 6-speed manual or the 6-speed "SMG-II" sequential manual gearbox.

The E46 was phased out starting in late 2004 with the release of the E9x, but the coupé and convertible continued to be manufactured until 2006. The Compact nameplate was also discontinued in 2004 with the release of the first generation 1 Series.

== Fifth generation (E90/E91/E92/E93; 2004) ==
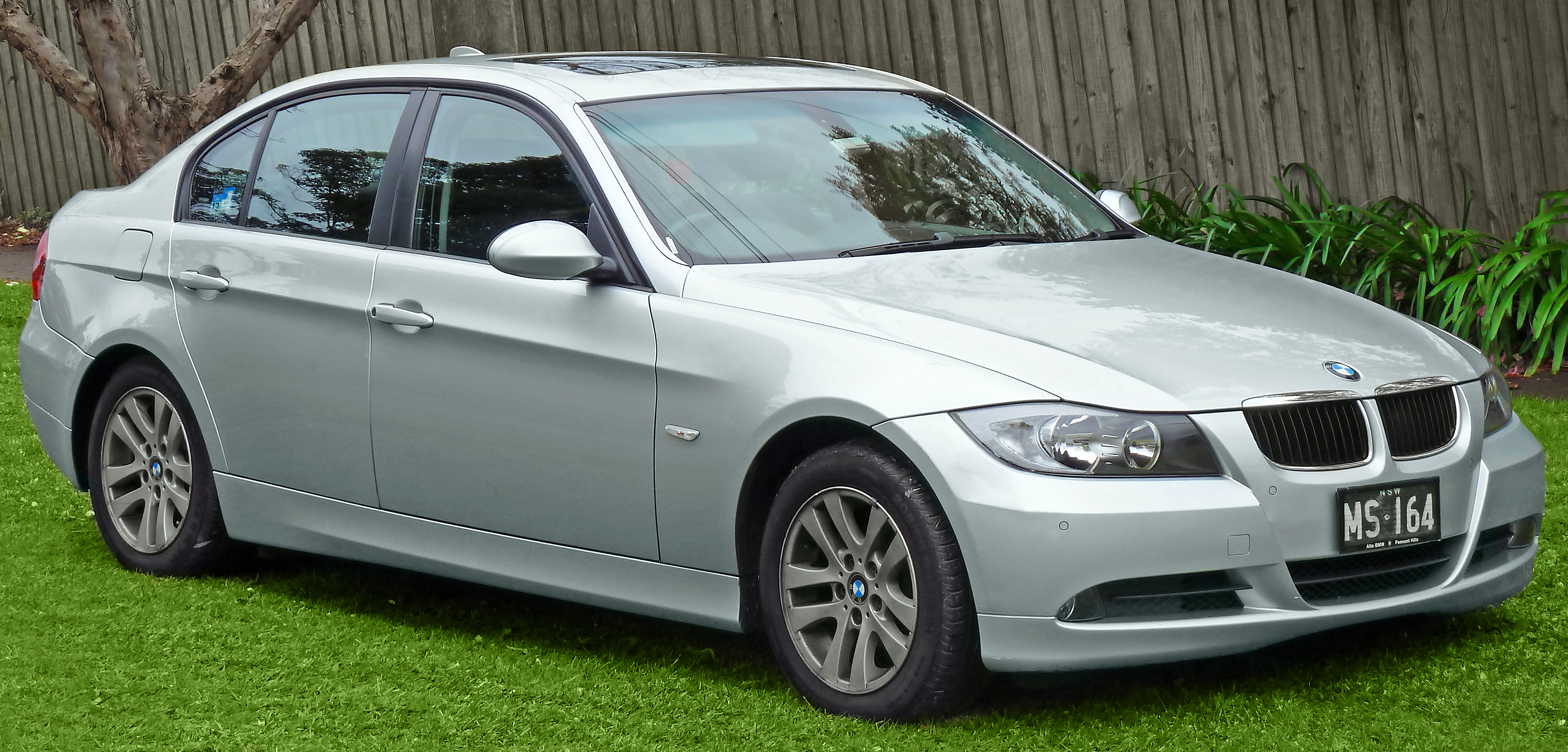
E90 sedan

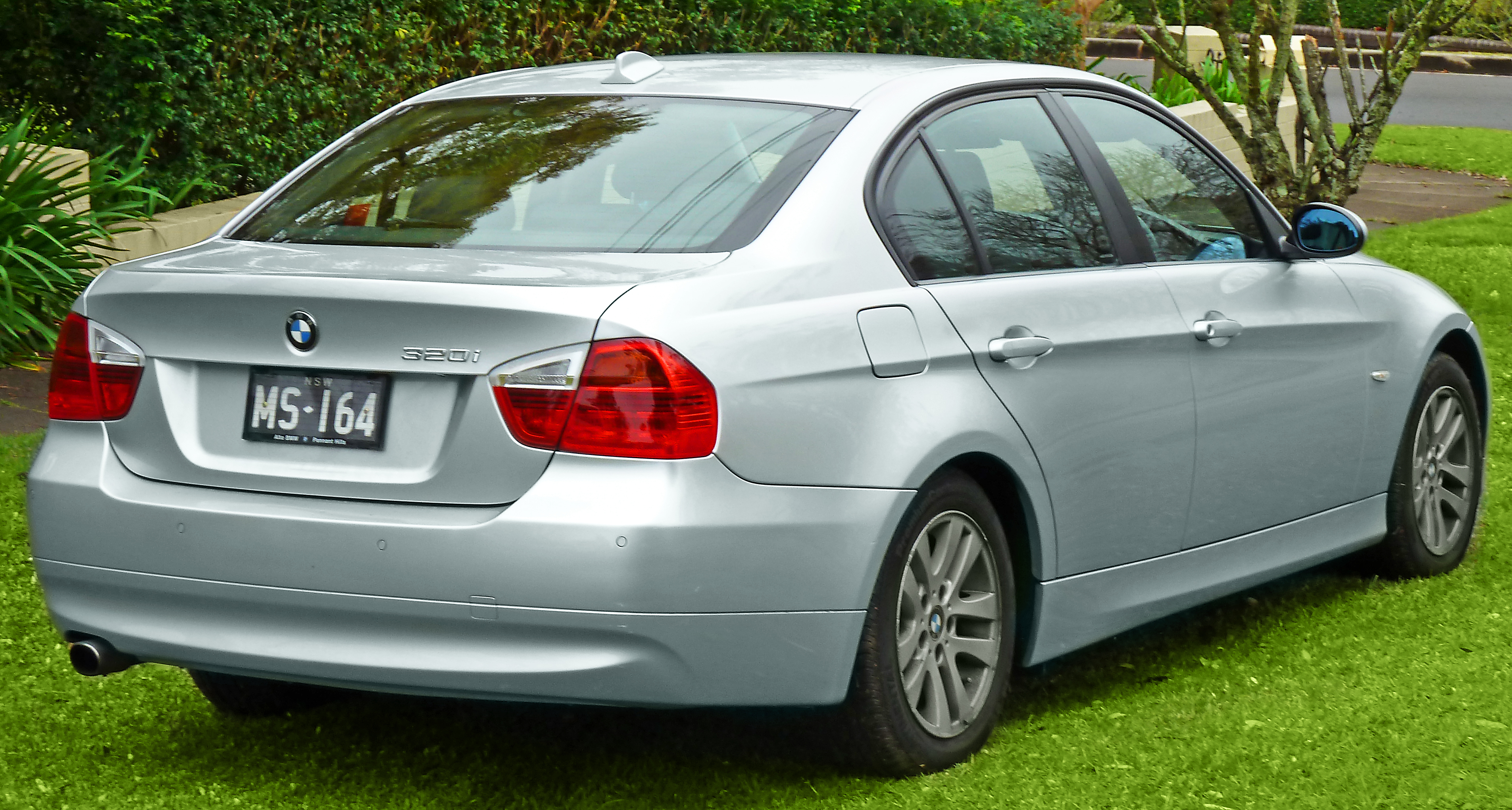
E90 sedan

The E9x was first made available in 2004; produced in the sedan, wagon (marketed as "Touring"), coupé and cabriolet body styles. Due to the separate model codes for each body style, the term "E9x" is sometimes used to describe this generation of the 3 Series.

In 2006, the 335i became the first 3 Series model to be sold with a turbocharged gasoline engine. The E90 also saw the introduction of run-flat tires to the 3 Series range. Consequently, cars with run flats are not equipped with spare tires.

The E90/E92/E93 M3 was the first mass-produced 3 Series powered by the a V8 engine; namely the BMW S65. It was released in 2007 and was produced in sedan, coupe, and cabriolet body styles.

The E90 began being phased out starting with North America in late 2012 with the release of the F3x, but the coupé and convertible continued to be manufactured until 2013. This also marked the end of the original nomenclature; as all models from this point mark their model numbers by relative power, rather than following the engine displacement.

== Sixth generation (F30/F31/F34/F35; 2011) ==
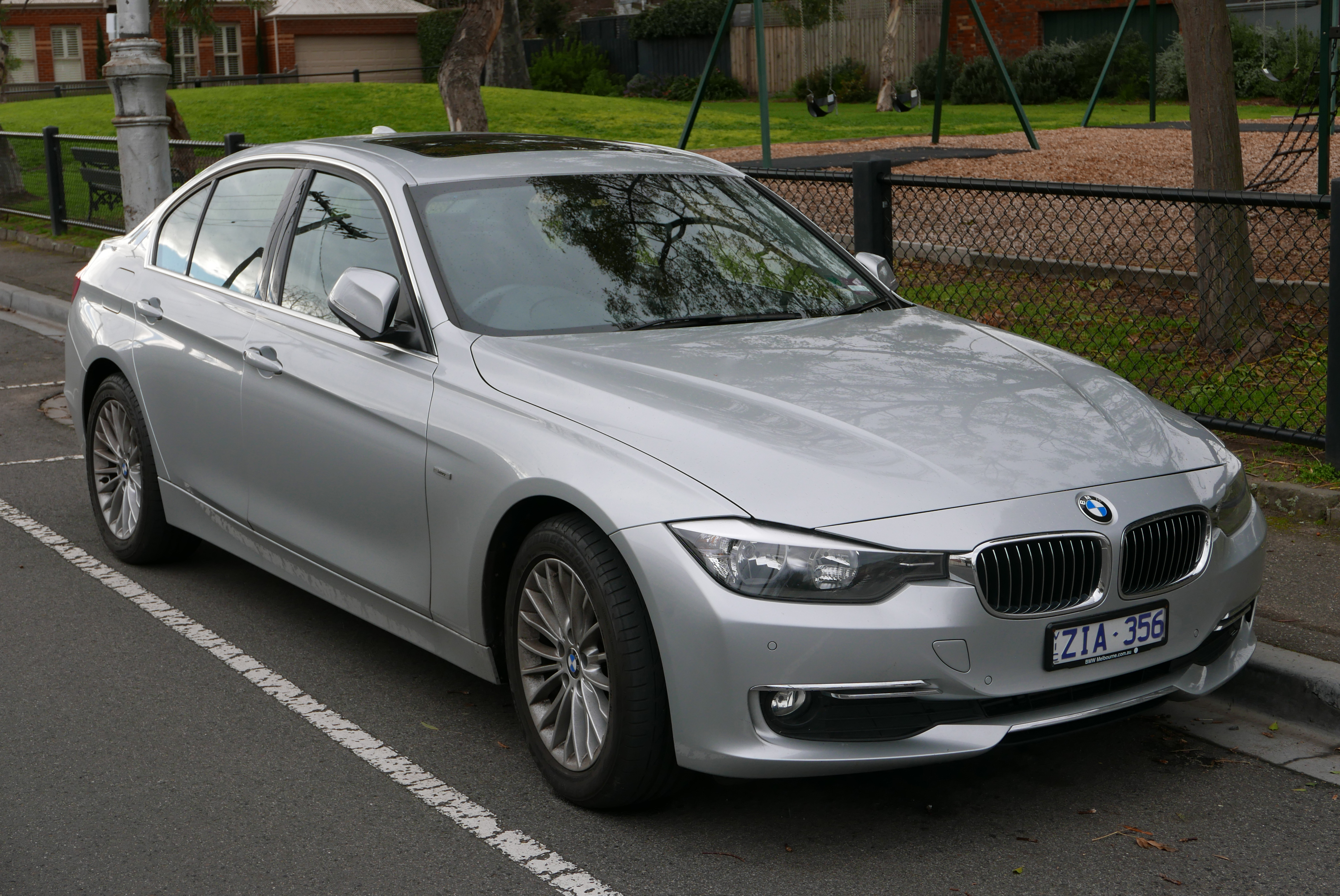
F30 sedan

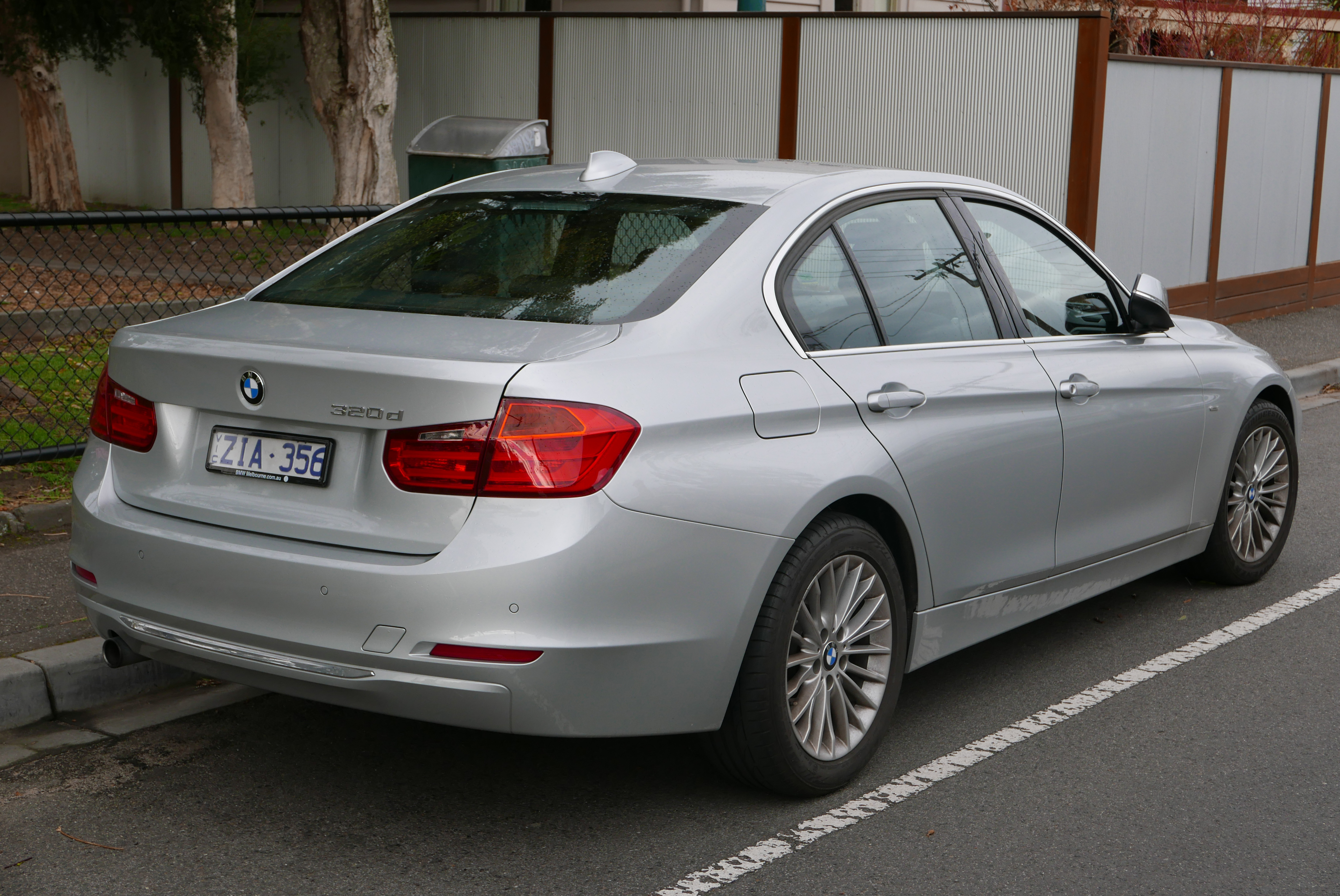
F30 sedan

The F30/F31/F35 has been produced in the sedan, coupé, convertible, station wagon and 5-door hatchback ("Gran Turismo") body styles. A long-wheelbase sedan is also available in China.

For the F30/F31/F34 series, the coupe and convertible models were produced from the 2013 year until 2014 when they were split from the 3 Series, redesigned, and sold as the BMW 4 Series. A new body style was introduced into the 3 Series range: the 3 Series Gran Turismo, a long-wheelbase hatchback.

In 2016, a plug-in hybrid drivetrain was first used in the 3 Series, in the 330e model. Also in 2016, a 3-cylinder engine was used for the first time in a 3 Series.

The M3 version (designated F80, the first time an M3 has used a separate model designation) was released in 2014 and is powered by the S55 twin-turbo straight-6 engine.

The F3x began being phased out starting 2018 with the release of the G2x, but the Touring continued production until June 2019.

== Seventh generation (G20/G21/G28; 2018) ==
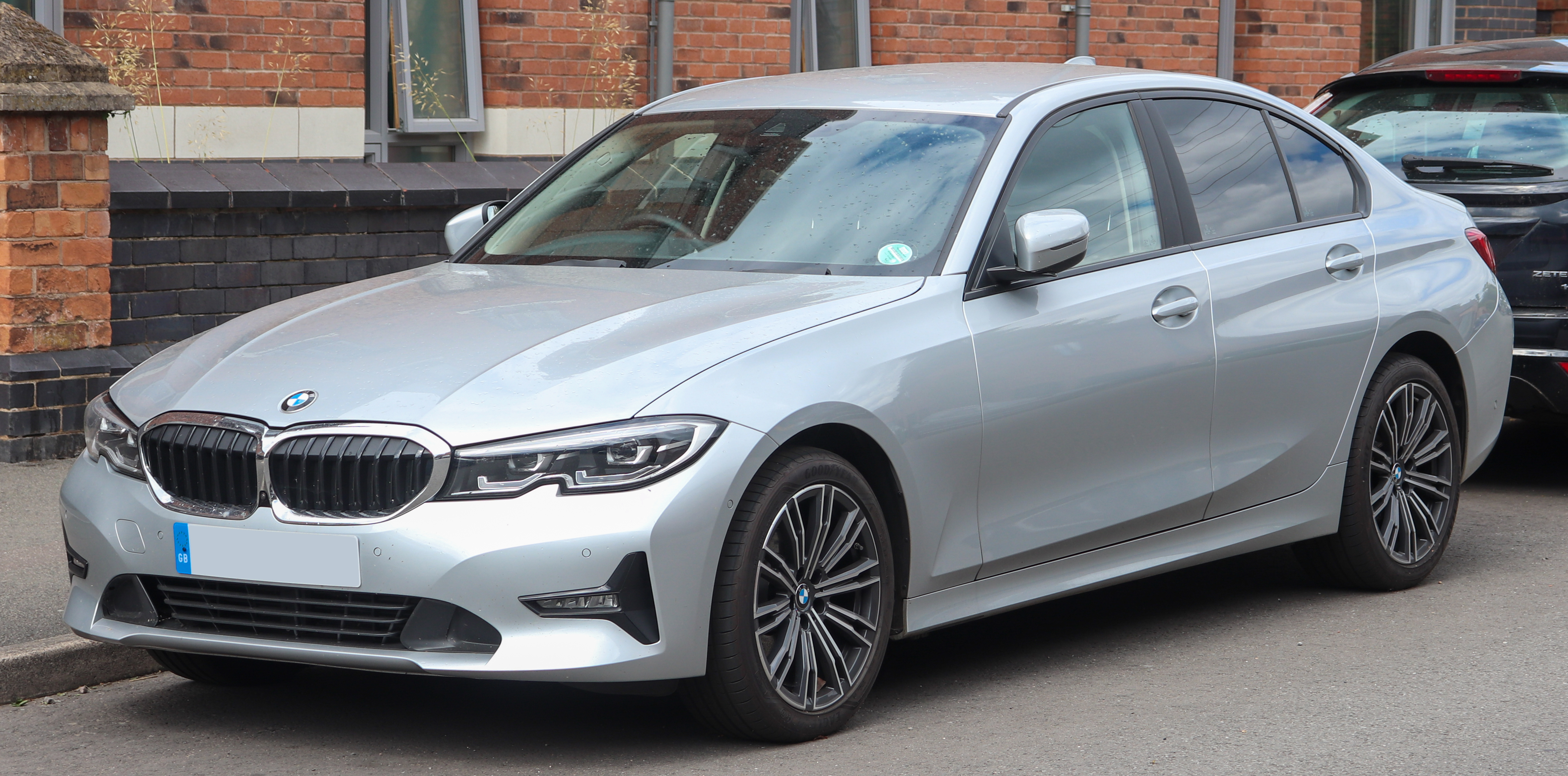
G20 sedan (front)

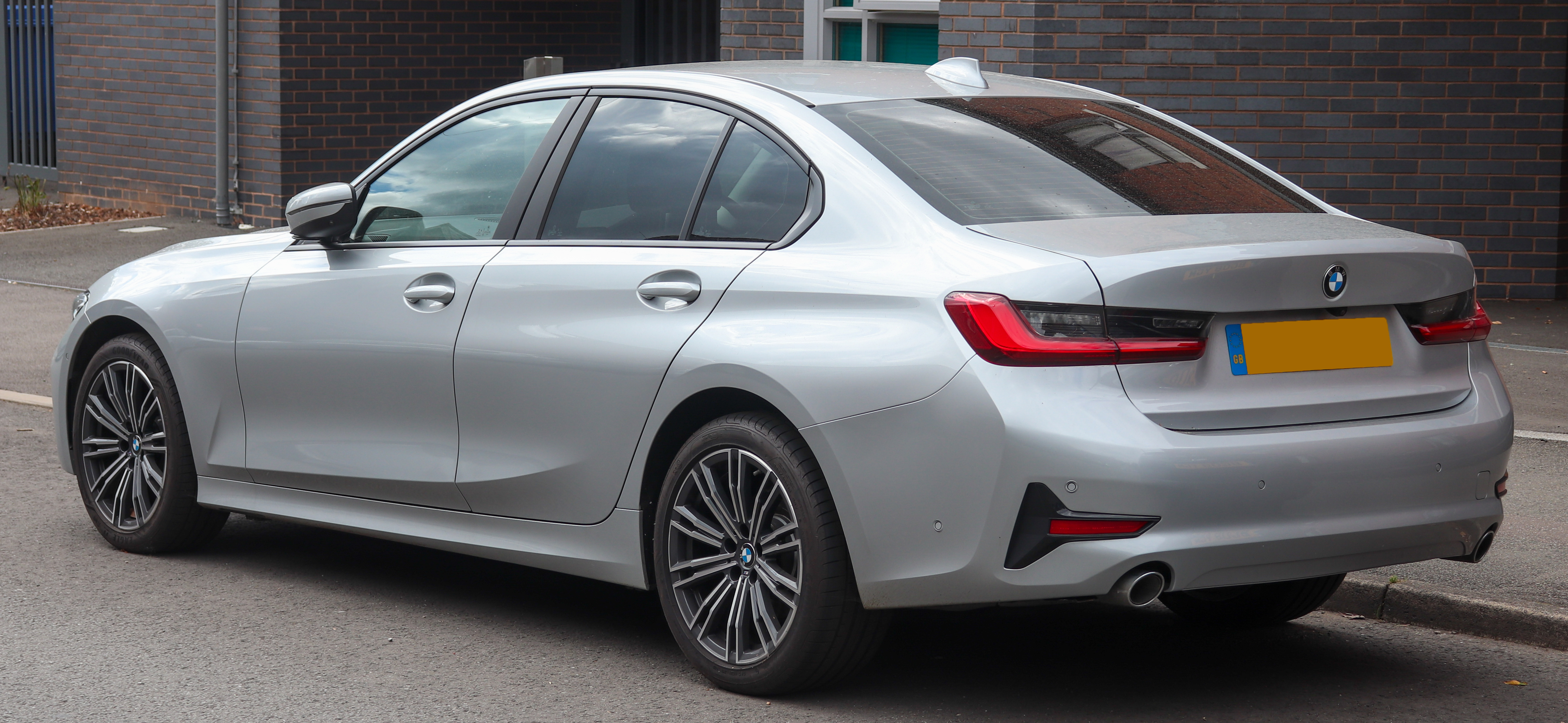
G20 sedan (rear)

The BMW 3 Series (G20) was unveiled at the 2018 Paris Motor Show on 2 October 2018. The official images of the vehicle were revealed a day prior to its unveiling. The seventh generation of the 3 Series is also offered as a station wagon. The more powerful M3 and M3 Competition variants were delivered globally starting in 2021. The G20 is the first 3 Series generation to bring an M3 Touring to market. Since 2022, it gained a battery electric version exclusive for the Chinese market as the i3, sharing its powertrain with the globally marketed i4. A facelift was revealed in May 2022, and launched in select markets in November 2022, for the 2023 model year.

== Eighth generation (G50/NA0; 2027) ==
The eighth generation of the 3 Series consists of the internal combustion G50, based on the G20's CLAR II platform, and the battery electric NA0, based on the Neue Klasse platform. Both cars are mechanically unrelated and share very few key components, though they have been designed to look as similar as possible in both the exterior and interior, only with differences in proportion. All models are slated to enter production in the first quarter of 2027.

== M versions ==
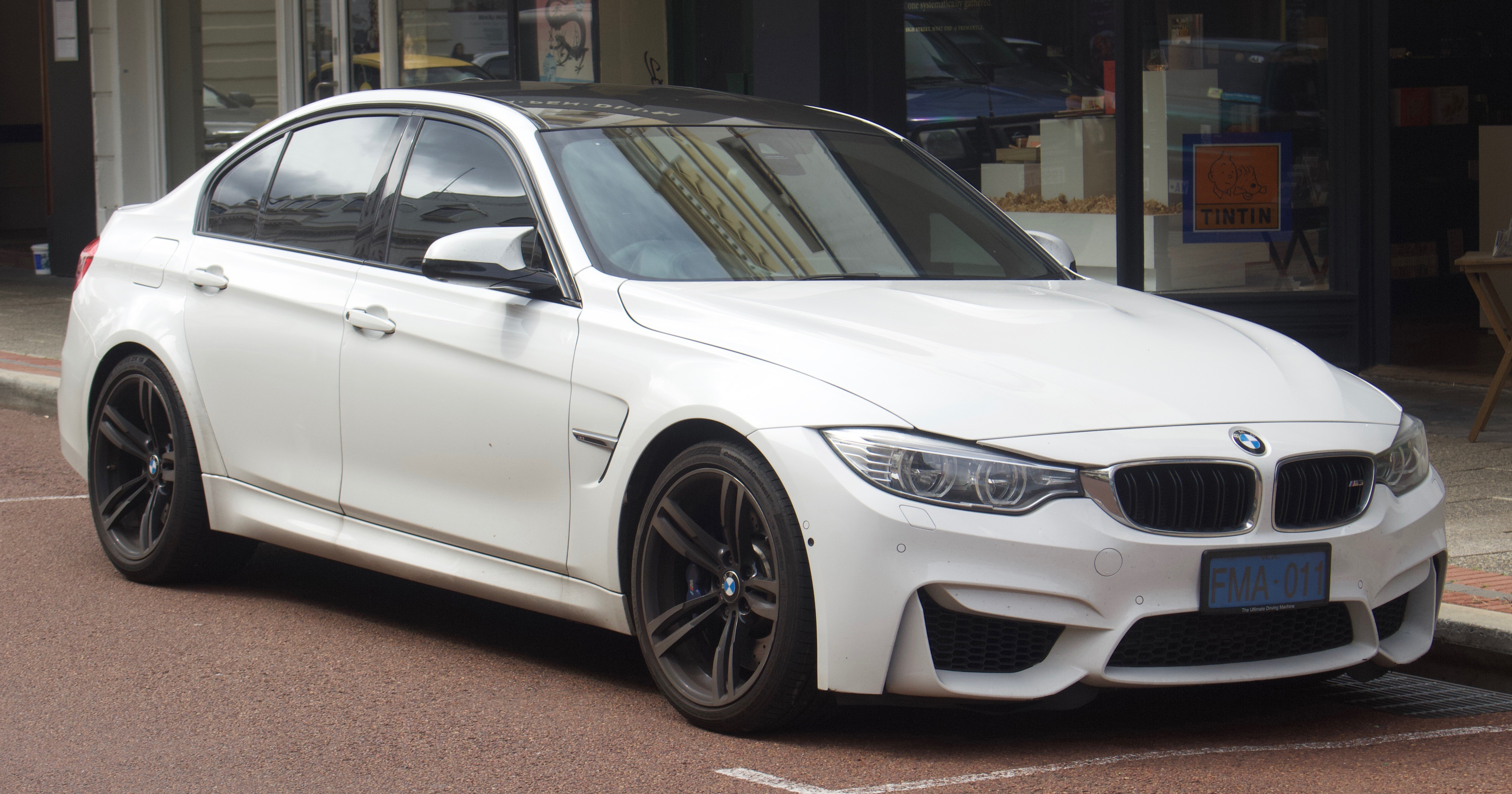
F80 M3 (front)

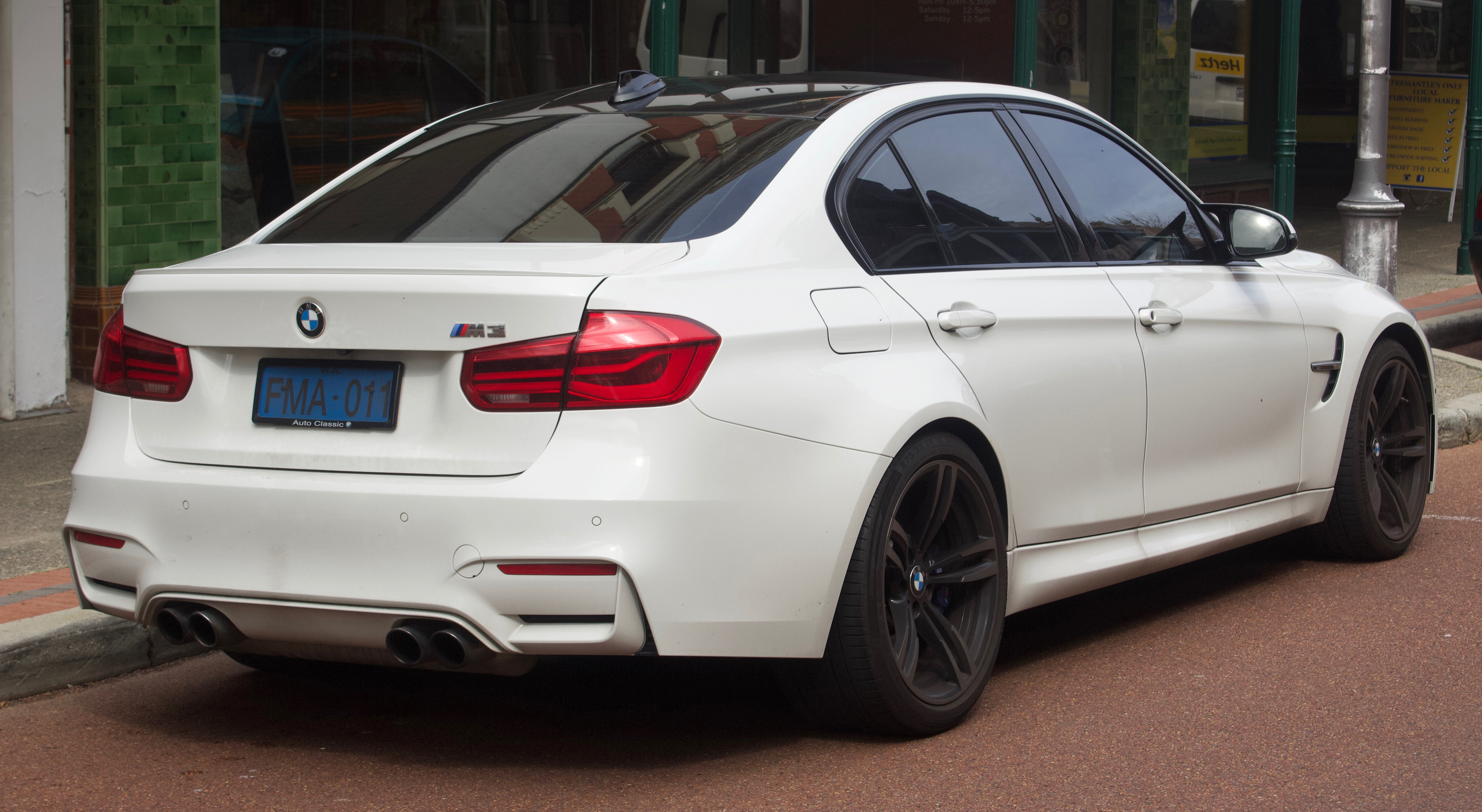
F80 M3 (rear)

The M3 is the most performance oriented version of the 3 Series. It is designed and developed by BMW's in-house motorsport division, BMW M.

M3 models have been derived from the E30, E36, E46, E90/E92/E93, and F30 (designated F80) 3 series and have been marketed with coupé, sedan and convertible body styles. Upgrades over the "standard" 3 Series automobiles include more powerful and responsive engines, improved handling/suspension/braking systems, aerodynamic body enhancements, lightweight components, and interior/exterior accents with the tri-color "M" (Motorsport) emblem.

The last M3 coupé was produced in Germany on 5 July 2013, replaced by the F82/F83 M4 coupé and convertible starting with the 2015 model year, but the M3 name remains in use for the sedan version. The new generation M3 was reintroduced in 2021, codenamed G80 from the 7th generation 3 Series (G20). The M3 represented above (The F80) was powered by a BMW S55 engine producing 317 kW (431 PS) at 7,600 rpm.

In June 2022, BMW revealed the first BMW M3 Touring, codenamed G81. Based on the seventh generation 3 Series, it marks the first time a BMW M Touring model reached the market. The touring version of the M3 contains the same engine and interior setup as the M3 sedan, but extends the roof line to become a wagon.

== Awards and recognition ==
The 3 Series has been on Car and Driver magazine's annual 10 Best list 22 times, from 1992 through 2014, making it the longest-running entry in the list. In their December 2009 issue, Grassroots Motorsports magazine named the BMW 3 Series as the second-most important performance car built during the previous 25 years. In January 2021, the BMW 330e M Sport (M Sport Pro Package) was named Executive Car of the Year by What Car? magazine. What Car? awarded the 3 Series five stars out of five in its review of the car.

The plug-in hybrid version of the car was the UK's best-selling plug-in hybrid car of 2021 having achieved 10,979 new registrations throughout the year, beating the Mercedes A-Class by over 4,000 registrations.

== Production and sales ==
Year	Production	Sales					
Year	Production	Europe	U.S.*	China		Malaysia (Note: Figures based on registration (Malaysia))	Indonesia
Year	Production	Europe	U.S.*	3-series	i3	Malaysia	Indonesia
1980			25,771		—		—
1981			28,927		—		—
1982			35,190		—		—
1983			33,602		—		—
1984			30,868		—		—
1985			53,927		—		—
1986			61,822		—		—
1987			58,897		—		
1988			34,914		—		
1989			21,738		—		
1990			22,825		—		2,059
1991			29,002		—		2,307
1992			38,040		—		1,197
1993			45,594		—		1,160
1994			46,287		—		2,183
1995			50,146		—		2,596
1996			50,248		—		3,077
1997	337,800	216,866	52,472		—		2,855
1998	376,900	247,786	57,520		—		680
1999	454,000	304,983	77,138		—		456
2000	509,007	330,604	89,681		—	1,791	2,096
2001	533,952	343,991	103,227		—	1,745	2,429
2002	561,249	350,606	115,428		—	1,803	1,609
2003	528,358	320,029	111,944		—	1,503	1,546
2004	449,732	269,216	106,549		—	1,771	1,367
2005	434,342	244,886	106,950		—	2,248	600
2006	508,479	289,597	120,180		—	2,217	235
2007	555,219	295,063	142,490		—	2,181	565
2008	474,208	251,334	112,464		—	2,150	399
2009	397,103	198,610	90,960		—	2,548	531
2010	399,009	183,122	100,910		—	2,500	523
2011	384,464	161,614	94,371		—	2,315	528
2012	406,752	175,022	99,602		—	3,597	760
2013	500,332	200,604	119,521		—	3,965	915
2014	480,214	168,275	142,232		—	4,237	1,143
2015	444,338	143,023	140,609		—	4,075	1,201
2016	411,844	144,561	106,221		—	3,631	825
2017	409,005	129,053	99,083		—	3,700	912
2018	366,475	106,991	75,957		—	3,396	641
2019	358,643	124,537	73,287		—	2,572	590
2020	381,416	118,369	50,937		—	2,621	571
2021			72,398		—	2,487	543
2022			67,354			2,327	529
2023			84,774	147,073	53,774	2,847	488
2024			73,938	146,362	47,503	2,548	797
2025			72,410	157,596	22,784	1,328	164

*Figures since 2013 include the BMW 4 Series

== See also ==
- List of BMW vehicles
