= Luggage Express =

Door-to-door luggage delivery service

- Company type: Subsidiary
- Industry: Transportation
- Founded: 1988; 37 years ago
- Founder: Universal Express with Richard Altomare
- Fate: Acquired in 2007
- Successor: Luggage Forward
- Headquarters: Boca Raton, Florida, United States
- Area served: Worldwide
- Services: Luggage delivery service
- Owner: Luggage Forward
- Website: www.lugex.com

Luggage Express is an American door-to-door luggage delivery service that was launched by parent company, Universal Express. Luggage Express arranged to pick up travelers' baggage at their home or office prior to a trip and have it waiting at the hotel or resort in the destination city.

In 2007, parent company Universal Express collapsed as a result of CEO, Richard Altomare issuing billions of illegal and unregistered shares of stock. A receiver was appointed federal judge at the request of the U.S. Securities and Exchange Commission to oversee the divestiture of assets. The receiver sold Luggage Express to Sports Express which ultimately became part of Luggage Forward.

== History ==
Luggage Express began service in 1988 and operated under the Universal Express umbrella until the company's collapse in 2007.

In 2007, Luggage Express was sold to Sports Express, LLC, a competitive luggage and sports equipment delivery company based in Durango, Colorado.

Sports Express and all related brands were acquired by First Luggage, a luggage shipping company based in the United Kingdom, in 2008.

In 2009, Luggage Forward acquired the Sports Express, Luggage Express, and Virtual Bellhop brands from First Luggage.
