= Classic Motorsports =

American magazine

Classic Motorsports Magazine
- Editor: David S. Wallens
- Categories: automobiles, do it yourself, historic motorsport
- Frequency: 6 per year
- Circulation: 42,000
- Publisher: Tom Suddard
- Founder: Tim Suddard, Marjorie Suddard
- Founded: 1986
- Country: United States
- Based in: Holly Hill, Florida
- Language: American English
- Website: Classic Motorsports
- ISSN: 1544-0753

Classic Motorsports is an American periodical devoted to classic cars, classic car restoration and vintage racing. It was established in 1986 and is published six times a year. The magazine's parent company, Motorsport Marketing Inc., based in Holly Hill, Florida, also publishes Grassroots Motorsports magazine.

Classic Motorsports focuses primarily on how enthusiasts of any means can own and enjoy classic automobiles. The magazine emphasizes that classic cars are meant to be driven rather than displayed or put in storage. Therefore, editorial often revolves around how to participate in vintage racing events, concours events and enthusiast gatherings as well as classic car rallies and tours. Each issue contains coverage of such events held throughout the United States.

The magazine also includes technical articles on how to maintain, restore and upgrade these cars. Buyers guides, car-and-owner profiles, historical features and driving impressions appear frequently. It is the largest publication of its kind in the United States and is the official publication of Historic Sportscar Racing (HSR).

== Project cars ==
The editorial focuses on a wide variety of staff-owned classics, usually with a hands-on point of view. Current project cars include:

- a 1984 Porsche 911 Carrera
- a 1960 Austin-Healey Sprite
- a 1967 Shelby GT 350

Past Classic Motorsports project cars include a 1964 Lotus Elan, a 1969 Triumph TR6, a 1971 Alfa Romeo Spider, a 1929 Ford Model A and a 1967 Austin Mini Cooper S, among many others.

== Sanctioned events ==
Classic Motorsports also actively supports classic car clubs and events. For many years, the magazine was the title sponsor of the Classic Motorsports Mitty, a classic car event held annually at the Road Atlanta race track in Braselton, Georgia. Historic Sportscar Racing sanctions The Mitty's vintage racing, while sister publication Grassroots Motorsports hosted an event in the infield called Speedfest.

In March 2010, Classic Motorsports hosted its first Orange Blossom Tour. The event was billed as a back-roads classic car tour through Old Florida. Between its starting point at the Amelia Island Concours and its 12 Hours of Sebring destination, the drive featured several stops. These included the Brumos Porsche Collection, an eco-tour on the Dora Canal, and the Castillo de San Marcos fort. The tour raised nearly $2000 for the Amelia Island Foundation to benefit Hospice.

Since then, Classic Motorsports has expanded into an entire branch of Classic Motorsports Road Tours, including the Orange Blossom Tour through Central Florida, the Smoky Mountain Tour through the Smoky Mountains and the Blue Ridge Parkway area, the Empire State Tour through the New York Finger Lakes region, and the now-retired Golden State Tour, which ran through northern California.

Classic Motorsports also hosts "kickoff" events for Monterey car week (the week ahead of the Pebble Beach Concours d'Elegance) and the Amelia Concours d'Elegance. These events are titled the Classic Motorsports Monterey Kickoff and the Classic Motorsports Amelia Island Kickoff, respectively.
