= Luggage Forward =

Door-to-door luggage and sports equipment shipping

Luggage Forward, LLC.
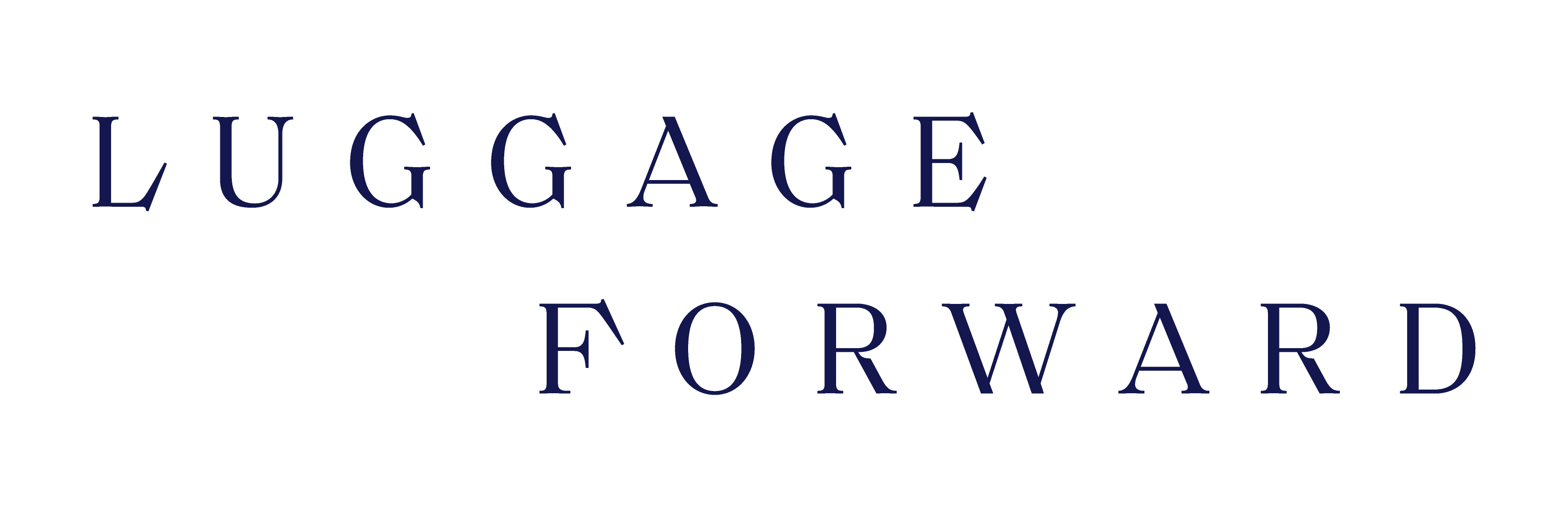
- Type: Private
- Industry: Shipping
- Founded: 2004
- Founder: Aaron Kirley, Zeke Adkins
- Headquarters: Boston, Massachusetts, United States
- Key people: Audrey Kohout, Jessica Palfrey
- Products: Luggage shipping
- Website: www.luggageforward.com

Luggage Forward specializes in door-to-door luggage and sports equipment shipping to more than two hundred countries and territories.

== History ==
Luggage Forward was created in 2004 by co- founders Zeke Adkins and Aaron Kirley. The company works in partnership with Federal Express, UPS, DHL and other smaller shippers in order to provide shipping of luggage domestically and internationally. As major US airlines began introducing fees for checking bags, demand for Luggage Forward's service more than doubled.

== Shipping Services ==
Luggage is picked up at the doorstep of a home and taken straight to the traveler's hotel, rental home, cruise port or golf course. There is no need for additional packaging.

Pricing is based on the size and number of bags being shipped as well as the shipping speed. Luggage Forward's pricing model is all-inclusive - there are no taxes or pick-up, handling or fuel surcharges.

== Partnerships ==
Luggage Forward has partners throughout the travel industry and is the exclusive luggage delivery partner for Seabourn Cruise Line, providing the shipping for the Personal Valet^{SM} service. Luggage Forward also powers the Luggage Liaison program for The Luxury Collection.

== Acquisitions ==
In 2009, Luggage Forward purchased several competitive brands including Baggage Quest and Sports Express. The Sports Express purchase included Luggage Express, Virtual Bellhop and Luggage advance, all brands operated by Sports Express. Luggage Forward also purchased Ship Luggage and Wisconsin-based The Luggage Club in 2011. In 2014, Luggage Forward also acquired LugLess.

== Awards ==
Luggage Forward has been named to multiple annual rankings of fast-growing companies.

Inc. 5000

Luggage Forward was included in the Inc. 5000, an annual list of America's fastest growing privately held companies, for three consecutive years.

- 2011 – 12th fastest growing Travel company with a three-year growth rate of 172%.
- 2012 – 9th fastest growing Travel company with a three-year growth rate of 126%.
- 2013 – 34th fastest growing Travel & Hospitality company with a three-year growth rate of 97%.
- 2014 - 48th fastest growing Travel & Hospitality company with a three-year growth rate of 61%.

Inner City 100

Luggage Forward was recognized two years in a row on the Inner City 100 list, a ranking of the fastest growing inner city companies. The Inner City 100 is compiled by the Initiative for a Competitive Inner City, a nonprofit research and strategy organization founded in 1994 by Harvard Business School Professor Michael Porter.

- 2012 – 21st fastest growing inner city company with a five-year compound annual growth rate of 55%.
- 2013 – 30th fastest growing inner city company with a five-year compound annual growth rate of 36%.
- 2014 - 77th fastest growing inner city company with a five-year compound annual growth rate of 130.7%.
