= Universal Express =

- Defunct: 2007
- Headquarters: Boca Raton, Florida, United States
- Key people: Richard A. Altomare (CEO)

Universal Express (abbreviated USXP) claimed to be a transportation and logistics service company and was registered in Nevada and headquartered in Boca Raton, Florida. However, investigation by the SEC clearly revealed that the primary business of USXP was the production of and distribution of billions of illegal, unregistered shares. The money from these sales went directly to support the lavish lifestyle of Richard Altomare and his supporters. Some funds were diverted to advertising designed to push the sale of additional shares.

Chief Executive Officer Richard A. Altomare took control of the defunct Packaging Plus Services in 1988, and he immediately began issuing billions of illegal and unregistered shares of stock, before the company collapsed in 2007. In later years, the company became known for accusations of naked short selling and questionable S.E.C. filings. A receiver was appointed for Universal Express by a federal judge at the request of the S.E.C. The judge ordered Universal and its top officers to pay $21.9 million and barred them from future penny stock sales.

Altomare was ordered to prison for contempt of court in April 2008. In May, 2008, he was incarcerated in the Metropolitan Correctional Center, New York City. Altomare has been barred from being an executive of any public company. A federal court judge, in finding that the company and its top officers had violated securities laws, called Altomare and Universal Express' general counsel, Chris Gunderson, "repeated and remorseless violators" of the securities laws. The Court ordered Universal Express to pay more than $9 million in disgorgement for illegally obtained profits and an additional $9 million in civil penalties as restitution for wrongdoing.

== Services ==
The company's UniversalPost network claimed to provide support infrastructure for private Postal Service Centers. In press releases, the company claimed that the contract brought in $9 million of annual revenue from 9,000 private postal stores. A U.S. District Court judge found that those press releases were misleading and fictional and that the company used them to sell 500 million shares of illegally issued stock between 2002 and 2004. Independent contacts with the claimed partner postal center revealed they were not aware of any relationship with USXP.

The company's Luggage Express service allowed travelers to have their luggage collected and delivered separately from their personal travel arrangements. In 2005, Altomare claimed that the company had not lost any of the 4.5 million suitcases it had handled.

Michael Xirinachs was charged with engaging in unregistered distribution and sale of over 21 billion shares of Universal Express. He too received an injunction, disgorgement, civil penalties, and a penny stock bar.
