= Grassroots Motorsports =

American auto racing magazine

Grassroots Motorsports Magazine
- Cover of December 2024 issue
- Editor: David S. Wallens
- Categories: Automobiles, motorsports, do it yourself
- Frequency: 8 per year
- Circulation: 60,000+
- Publisher: Tom Suddard
- Founder: Tim Suddard, Marjorie Suddard
- Founded: 1984
- Country: United States
- Based in: Ormond Beach, Florida
- Language: American English
- Website: grassrootsmotorsports.com
- ISSN: 1047-0298

Grassroots Motorsports (GRM) is an American print and digital periodical devoted to hardcore sports cars, driving skill improvement, technical advice, and amateur motorsports such as road racing, autocross and rallying. It was established in 1984 and is published eight times a year. The magazine's parent company, Motorsport Marketing Inc., is based in Holly Hill, Florida and also publishes Classic Motorsports magazine. The company also publishes various event guides and other print materials for select clients.

Motorsport Marketing is also an event company, hosting or sponsoring large annual events under the banner of one or both magazines. Some of its past and present Grassroots-centric events include the Tire Rack Ultimate Track Car Challenge presented by Grassroots Motorsports, GRM Speedfest at the Classic Motorsports Mitty, the Grassroots Motorsports $2000 Challenge and the GRM Experience at the Rolex 24 At Daytona. Staff members are also present at most large national and regional automotive enthusiast events involving modern or vintage sports cars.

== Magazine Origins ==
Grassroots Motorsports was originally called "Auto-X" and started in 1984 in Deland, Florida by publisher Tim Suddard and his wife, Margie. The name was changed to Grassroots Motorsports a few years later.

== Project Cars ==
Grassroots Motorsports magazine's "Project Cars" section focuses on a wide variety of staff-owned road and track cars. It presents in-depth technical information from a very hands-on, do-it-yourself point of view.

Past GRM project cars include a Mazda MX-5 24 Hours of LeMons racer and autocrosser, a MINI Cooper S race car, a BMW M235i track day car, a Volkswagen New Beetle multi-purpose car, and a LeGrand Mk. 18 race car built for autocross.

One of the most famous project cars in the magazine's history is the Ro-Spit, a 200-plus-horsepower, rotary-powered Triumph Spitfire.

== Subscriptions ==
The regular subscription price for one year (eight printed issues) of Grassroots Motorsports is $29.99. The company occasionally holds sales, sometimes offering subscriptions during the holidays for as little as $19.99 per year.

The magazine is also available as an e-publication that can be viewed on personal computers and mobile devices. It includes all the same content as the print version but is enhanced with hyperlinks to relevant information mentioned in its pages. Digital subscriptions come at a slightly lower cost than print: One year, for example, is $19.99.

== Grassroots Motorsports $2000 Challenge ==
The magazine holds an annual competition referred to generally as the Grassroots Motorsports $2000 Challenge. When referring to a specific running of the event, the name changes to reflect the year it was held (i.e., $2015 Challenge in 2015). The main goal of the Challenge is to demonstrate that fun, capable and attractive cars do not have to be expensive. The total budget for entries cannot cost more than the year in American dollars (i.e., $2015 in 2015), hence the name. The competition consists of an autocross competition, a quarter-mile (0.4 km) dragstrip time trial and a concours d'elegance.

A special points system determines the final rank of each entry based on its performance in each segment of the competition. Along with first-, second- and third-place trophies, other awards are distributed to deserving competitors, including "Most Spectacular Failure," "Challengers' Choice," and "Editors' Choice."

The first Challenge event was held in 1999, before the staff instituted the "year as the budget" naming convention; the budget cap for cars in that event was $1500. According to the magazine's longtime art director, J.G. Pasterjak, the $1500 Challenge was intended to feature staff-built cars as a way to create editorial content for the magazine: "Well, originally it was supposed to be just a staff thing. Then readers got wind of it and wanted to come."

The second Challenge event was held in 2001 with the budget cap set at $2001. The event then became annual, with the budget cap increasing by one dollar each year—the idea being to account for inflation.

The $2015 Challenge overall winner was Andrew Nelson and his V8-powered Volkswagen Beetle. Nelson and his family have been attending the event with their homebuilt creations for the past 11 years.

== Ultimate Track Car Challenge ==
In 2007, Grassroots Motorsports added another competition to its lineup with the Ultimate Track Car Challenge. The goal of the UTCC is to discover the fastest track car in a field governed by minimal classifications. After that, it became an annual event held every summer at Virginia International Raceway.

Thirty-six cars competed at the Virginia International Raceway North Course in 2007. The overall winner was a Dodge Viper Competition coupe with pro driver Tommy Archer at the wheel. In 2008, the event moved to Buttonwillow Raceway Park, and Bart Carter took first place overall in his Radical SR8. In 2009, the event was held at the Virginia International Raceway Full Course; Marc Goossens beat out a field of more than 50 cars to take the overall win in his Riley Technologies Track Day Car.

As of 2023, the UTCC's date and location have changed; it will occur each year in October at NCM Motorsports Park in Bowling Green, KY as part of the SCCA Time Trials Nationals.

== Internet Forum ==
The Grassroots Motorsports online forum is a section of the magazine's official website. Discussion is allowed on almost any topic, automotive or not. Forum members use the boards to ask car-related questions, post build threads to track their progress on a project car, organize user gatherings, and share information about events. Magazine staff moderate and actively participate.

Users must complete an online registration and create a username to post to the forum. Users gain "Dork" status as their post count rises. Users with several thousand posts are not rare, and it typically takes them less than a year to build reach several thousand posts.

Status	Post Count
New Reader	0
Reader	100
Half Dork	500
Dork	1000
Super Dork	2000
Ultra Dork	3000
Uber Dork	4000
Power Dork	5000
UltimaDork	7000
MegaDork	10,000

Two of the most popular threads in the history of the forum have unlikely titles: "Ignore" and "Can we please stop hotlinking pics?" They have reached 300+ pages of posts by regular and new users alike. As of March 2016, the "hotlinking" thread had 76527 posts spanning 3062 pages.

== Message Board Memes ==
Several initialisms are frequently used in place of common phrases:

- SWMBO: "She Who Must Be Obeyed," meaning a female significant other.
- NMNA: "Not Mine, No Affiliation," typically posted in the "For Sale" section alongside a link to an item for sale (usually a car on Craigslist) that may be of interest to the community but is not being sold by the poster.

Several words are automatically filtered to keep the forum family-friendly and relatively spam-free. They are replaced with unorthodox alternatives as follows:

- E36 M3: the "S" word.
- Berkeley: the "F" word.
- Bob Costas: the "P" word in the context of the female anatomy.
- Shiny Happy Person: the "A" word.
- Ford Econobox: the word "Escort"
- Switchboard Operator: the term "Call Girl"

Forum members have also developed the following slang terms/phrases:

- Canoe: a label for spam posts inserted by bots or other non-regular posting methods.
- Flounder: a person or post that includes political rhetoric but doesn't necessarily add to the thread or topic. Based loosely on the National Lampoon Animal House character.
- "Yeah, but do all the pixels work?": a response intended to derail threads asking "Should I buy this car?" In reference to the readout panels of BMWs from the 1990s and early 2000s (decade) famous for losing pixels as they age.
