= Targa =

Targa or TARGA may refer to:

== Car racing events ==
- Targa Adelaide, in Australia
- Targa Canada West, in British Columbia
- Targa Florio, in Sicily, Italy, 1906–1977
- Targa Florio Rally, in Sicily, Italy, from 1978
- Targa High Country, in Victoria, Australia
- Targa New Zealand
- Targa Newfoundland, in Canada
- Targa Rignano, in Italy, 1902–1904
- Targa Tasmania, Australia
- Targa West, in Western Australia
- Targa Wrest Point, in Tasmania, Australia

== Places ==
- Targa, Kasur, Pakistan
- Targa, Sialkot, Pakistan
- Targa, Tasmania, Australia
- Tarġa Battery, in Malta

== Other uses ==
- Targa top, or targa, a car body style
  - Targa, versions of the Porsche 911
- Targa, a range of boats made by Fairline
- Targa, a range of boats used by the Metropolitan Police Marine Policing Unit
- Targa, unreleased version of video game Rendering Ranger: R2
- Targa, a pen by Sheaffer
- Truevision TGA, or TARGA, an image file format
- UP Targa, a German paraglider design

== See also ==
- Targe, a general word for shield in late Old English
- Targa Resources, an American company
- Targa timing system, a system of timing used in car rallying
