= Targa Adelaide =

- Category: Tarmac Rally
- Country: Adelaide, South Australia, Australia
- Inaugural event: 2011
- winning driver: (Australia) Glenney
- winning car: Nissan GT-R Spec-V
- Official Website: www.targaadelaide.com.au

Targa Adelaide was a tarmac-based rally event held annually in Adelaide, South Australia, Australia between 2011 and 2013. The inaugural classic only event was 2011, but included modern vehicles in 2012 and 2013. The event had an intermediate-length course design by Stuart Benson of approximately 260 competitive kilometres covered in five days over twenty nine closed road competitive rally stages. Targa Adelaide was the successor of the Classic Adelaide Rally (1997-2009) and preceded the Adelaide Rally (2015-present).

== Rally format ==
The event was mostly held south-east of Adelaide in the Adelaide hills area and race in Adelaide on the first night of competition.

In 2011, the legs of the race were:

- Leg 0 InterContinental Night Stage - Adelaide Showgrounds
- Leg 1 Upper Hermitage to Forreston, Kersbrook
- Leg 2 Mount Lofty to Belair, via Heathfield
- Leg 3 Castambul to Ironbank, via Stirling
- Leg 4 Gorge Road to Torrens, ending in the gala finish on Norwood Parade

The 2012 event was held between the 22nd to 26th of August. The legs of the race were:

- Leg 0: Intercontinental Night Stage
- Leg 1: Medlow to Castambul
- Leg 2: Montacute to Stirling
- Leg 3: Eagle on the Hill to Norton Summit
- Leg 4: Gorge road to Clarendon.

A driver named Adam Plate was killed in a crash during the 2012 Targa Rally, while his navigator, Patrick Chan, was injured and had to be airlifted to hospital.

== List of past winners ==
=== Modern Competition ===
Year	Driver	Navigator	Vehicle
2012	(Australia) White	(Australia) White	2011 Lamborghini Gallardo Super Trofeo Stradale
2013	(Australia) Glenney	(Australia) Webb	2009 Nissan GT-R Spec-V

=== Classic Competition ===
Year	Driver	Navigator	Vehicle
2011	(Australia) Weeks	(Australia) Fever	1974 Porsche 911 Carrera RS
2012	(Australia) Haysman	(Australia) Branum	1981 Triumph TR7 V8
2013	(Australia) Hoff	(Australia)	1975 Ford Escort RS2000

== Other Targa competitions ==
- Targa Tasmania - Australia (TAS)
- Targa New Zealand - New Zealand
- Targa Florio - Italy
- Targa West - Australia (WA)
- Targa Newfoundland - Canada
- Targa Canada West - Canada

== See also ==
Australian Targa Championship
