= Targa High Country =

- Category: Tarmac Rally
- Country: Victoria, Australia
- Inaugural event: 2010
- winning driver: (Australia) Quinn
- winning car: 2011 Nissan GTR
- Official Website: www.targahighcountry.com.au

Targa High Country is a tarmac-based rally event held in the state of Victoria, Australia, annually. The inaugural event was 2010. The event has a short course design of approximately 200 competitive kilometres covered in two days over sixteen closed road competitive rally stages.

== Rally format ==
The event is held north of Melbourne in the high country area and race around Mansfield on the first day of competition.

- Leg 0 Mansfield Prologue - Mansfield
- Leg 1 King Valley to Mt Buller - King Valley - Mt Buller
- Leg 2 Eildon to Mt Buller - Eildon - Mt Buller

== List of past winners ==
=== Modern Competition ===
Year	Driver	Navigator	Vehicle
2010	(Australia) Livingstone	(Australia) Livingstone	2009 Mitsubishi Lancer Evolution X
2011	(Australia) White	(Australia) White	Lamborghini Gallardo Superleggera
2012	(Australia) Quinn	(Australia) Tillett	2011 Nissan GTR

=== Classic Competition ===
Year	Driver	Navigator	Vehicle
2012	(Australia) Todd	(Australia) Tighe	1971 Ford Capri Perana

== Other Targa competitions ==
- Targa Tasmania - Australia (TAS)
- Targa New Zealand - New Zealand
- Targa Florio - Italy
- Targa West - Australia (WA)
- Targa Newfoundland - Canada
- Targa Canada West - Canada

== See also ==
Australian Targa Championship
