= Targa Wrest Point =

- Category: Tarmac Rally
- Country: Tasmania, Australia
- Inaugural event: 2009
- winning driver: (Australia) White
- winning co-driver: (Australia) White
- winning car: Lamborghini Gallardo
- Official Website: www.targawrestpoint.com.au

Targa Wrest Point is a tarmac-based rally event held on the island state of Tasmania, Australia, annually. The inaugural event was 2009. The event has a short course design by Stuart Benson of approximately 200 competitive kilometres covered in two days over sixteen closed road competitive rally stages.

== Rally format ==
The event is held south of Hobart in the greater Huon Valley area and visits the Tahune Airwalk on the first day of competition.

- Leg 1 Lucaston to Longley - Lucaston - Lucaston
- Leg 2 Pelverata to Cygnet - Pelverata - Pelverata

== List of past winners ==
=== Modern Competition ===
Year	Driver	Navigator	Vehicle
2009	(Australia) Garwood	(Australia) Allen	Porsche 911 GT3 RS
2010	(Australia) White	(Australia) White	Lamborghini Gallardo Superleggera
2011	(Australia) White	(Australia) White	Lamborghini Gallardo Superleggera
2012	(Australia) White	(Australia) White	Lamborghini Gallardo Supper Trofeo Stradale

=== Classic Competition ===
Year	Driver	Navigator	Vehicle	Margin
2010	(Australia) Duggan	(Australia) Duggan	1969 Datsun 2000 Sports	

== Other Targa competitions ==
- Targa Tasmania - Australia (TAS)
- Targa New Zealand - New Zealand
- Targa Florio - Italy
- Targa West - Australia (WA)
- Targa Newfoundland - Canada
- Targa Canada West - Canada

== See also ==
Australian Targa Championship
