= Kym Illman =

Australian photographer and entrepreneur

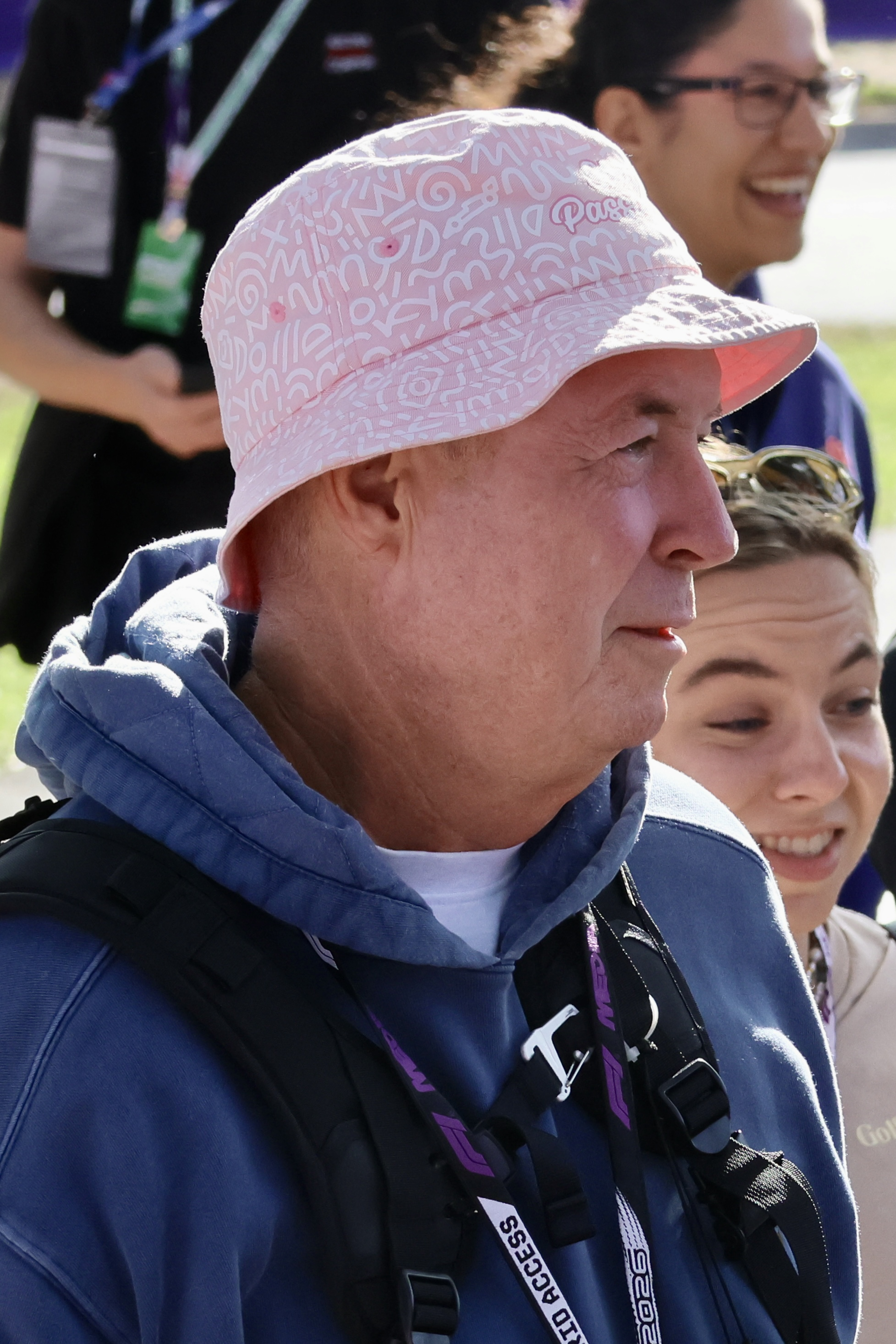
- Illman at the 2026 Australian Grand Prix
- Born: March 22, 1960 (age 66); Adelaide, Australia
- Occupations: Photographer; YouTuber

Kym Illman is an Australian motorsport photographer, entrepreneur and YouTuber. He became known in Australia during the 1990s for establishing Messages on Hold, a phone audio marketing company, which became successful through its high-profile ambush marketing. During the mid-2010s he became a Formula One photographer and content creator. His YouTube channel alone has more than 587,000 subscribers.

== Early life and career ==
Illman was born in Adelaide, South Australia. His father had played cricket for South Australia and ran a small business. He worked a variety of jobs as a young man, including working in a bank, as a radio announcer in Darwin and as an audio engineer for Sky Television and Channel 9 in Perth.

== Business career ==
=== Messages on Hold ===
After being made redundant in 1988, Illman founded Messages On Hold, an audio advertising company. Illman became well known for his ambush marketing style, promoting Messages on Hold at sporting events, most notably at Australian Football League (AFL) matches and at the 2000 Summer Olympics. He also had a close working relationship with Australian Cricketer, Shane Warne. Currently Messages On Hold has offices in Australia and Singapore, and is one of the largest audio marketing companies in the Asia-Pacific area.

=== Other business interests ===
In 2015, Illman founded Canity - an online customer service training platform. With engaging, bite-sized videos, Illman created Canity to improve customer service, and make training employees easier and more efficient. Canity covers topics like Listening Skills, Phone Skills, Dealing with Difficult Customers, and The Art of Small Talk.

Over the years, Illman has also built up a significant property portfolio, with major holdings on the Gold Coast of Queensland.

== Racing ==
In 2005, Illman won the modern challenge category at the Targa West Rally, which was also the first year of the event. Illman continued to race occasionally from then on, often registering in his own Mitsubishi Evo 9, and he would race in the Bathurst 12 Hour and the Targa Tasmania. At the 2011 Targa Tasmania Illman would crash but ultimately was unharmed.

== Photography ==
In 2015, Illman and his wife Tonya released a wildlife photo book called Africa on Safari which detailed their travels across Africa.

After Illman was invited by Red Bull Racing to be a corporate guest at the 2016 Abu Dhabi Grand Prix, Illman applied for an FIA media accreditation which was approved soon after. He started his F1 photography work during the 2017 Formula One season and has since posted significantly more on his YouTube account, created on 20 April 2006, and has over 540,000 subscribers on the platform and millions of views.

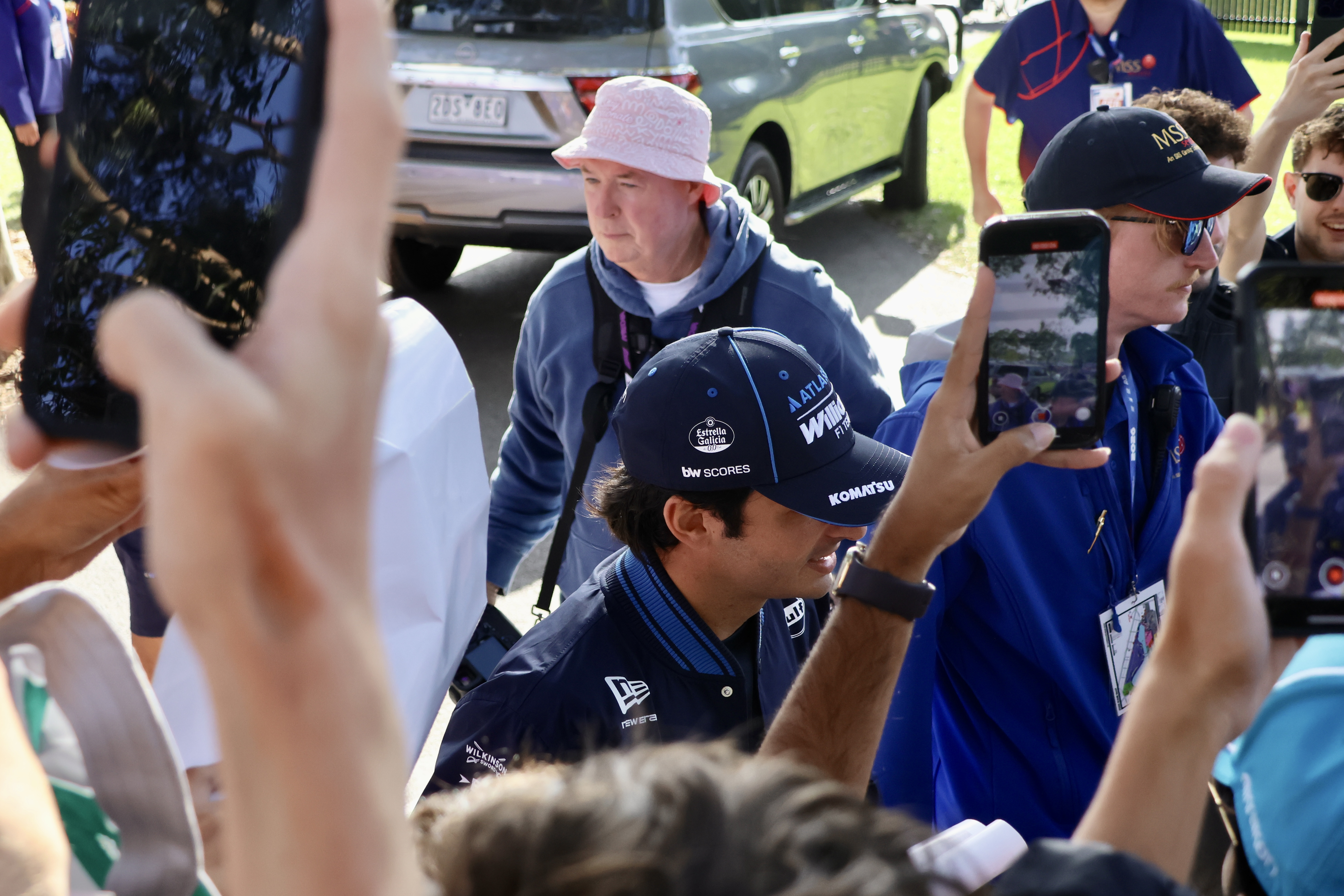
Illman (behind) at the 2026 Australian Grand Prix

Illman's main social media focus is the personal side of F1, sharing updates on drivers, teams, and life beyond the F1 grid. He also offers a selection of wall art, signed driver prints, photo books, and merchandise.

== Personal life ==
Illman is married to Tonya Illman. They met when Tonya joined Messages on Hold in 1990 as an administration manager. They have two sons.

Illman and his family live in a small, coastal town in Western Australia, called Lancelin.
