= Targa Canada West =

- Category: Rally
- Country: British Columbia, Canada
- Inaugural season: 2011
- Official website: http://www.targacanadawest.com

Targa Canada West was to be a tarmac-based rally race in British Columbia, Canada.

It was to take place on closed public roads in host communities, and historically stems from the popular Targa Florio and later the Mille Miglia.

Cars compete against the clock on paved roads: the cars start at 30 second intervals on 'special' or 'competition stages' of 10 to 25 km each (these roads are safely and temporarily closed to the public). In between competition stages, the vehicles 'transit' on public roads and conform to regular road rules.

The events are open to street-legal sports cars of all makes, models and vintages – with some exceptions (e.g. convertibles require a hard top and roll bar).

Regular street-legal cars can enter in Class 1 & 2 – after which additional safety equipment is required (roll cage, etc.) in higher speed classes 3 to 6.

Targa Canada West's inaugural event was to be determined via talks with host communities: 'though target is 2011 or 2012. A two- to three-day event to take place in the Southern Interior of BC, Canada

Targa Canada West planned a full five- or six-day Targa event in subsequent years, similar to the week-long events in Newfoundland, Tasmania and New Zealand.

== List of past winners ==
=== Open Competition ===
Year	Driver	Navigator	Vehicle
2011	(Canada) TBC	(Canada) TBC	CAR

=== Touring Competition ===
Year	Driver	Navigator	Vehicle	Margin
2011	(Canada) TBC	(Canada) TBC	1974 CAR	TIME

== Other Targa competitions ==
- Targa Tasmania - Australia
- Targa New Zealand - New Zealand
- Targa Florio - Italy
- Targa Wrest Point - Australia (TAS)
- Targa West - Australia (WA)
- Targa Newfoundland - Canada
