= Daytona Sportscar =

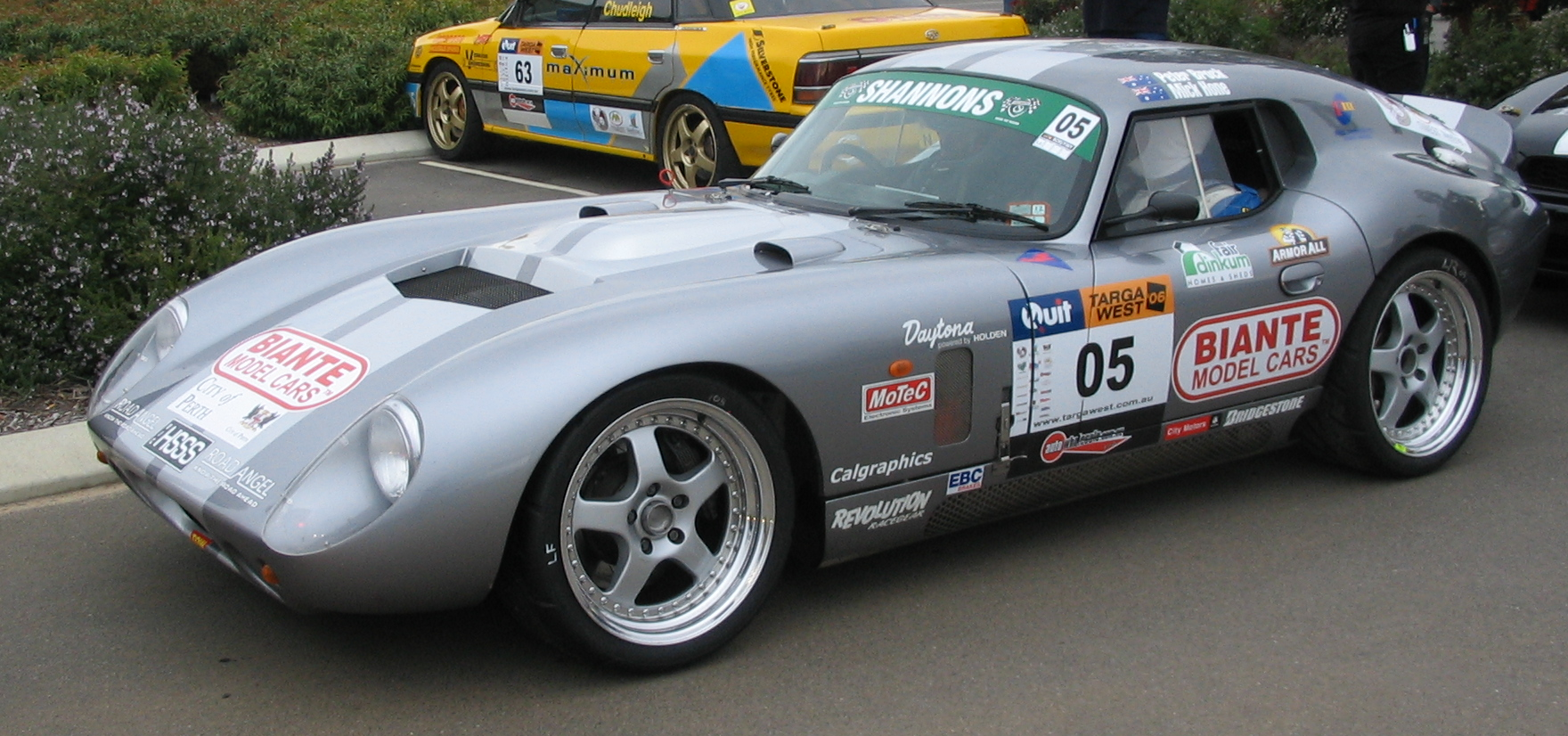
- Peter Brock's Daytona Coupé, photographed the day before the accident

Overview
- Manufacturer: Borland Racing Developments
- Production: 2001–present
- Assembly: Braeside, Victoria
- Designer: Ross Holder

Body and chassis
- Class: Grand tourer
- Body style: 2-door Coupé
- Layout: FR

Dimensions
- Curb weight: 1,100 kg (2,425 lb)

The Daytona Sportscar (sometimes referred to as the Daytona Coupe) is an Australian built reproduction of the Shelby Daytona coupé from 1964. It was built by Richard Bendell, designed by Ross Holder and the chassis builder was Michael Borland. So far eight have been built, by Victorian race car builder Borland Racing Developments, with the first car built in 2001. It has competed in several Australian tarmac rallies since, including Targa Tasmania and Targa West.

As well as the Shelby Daytona, the car bears some resemblance to the Ford Shelby GR-1, a 2005 concept car which was based on the same 1964 model.

== Specifications ==
Weighing 1,100 kg (2,425 lb), it is powered by a 6.0 litre (360 in³) LS1 Gen. III V8 engine, which was also used in the Holden Monaro. It had a top speed of 290 km/h (180 mph). The chassis is a purpose built space frame. As well as the engine, the car uses Holden Commodore SS components including the brakes, wheels, differential, steering column and controls. It has traction control and ABS braking systems.

== Fatal accident ==
Australian racing car champion Peter Brock was killed driving a Daytona owned by Richard Bendell in the Targa West rally on 8 September 2006, when it left the road and hit a tree sideways, in the driver's door.

In an interview the day before the crash, Brock said of the car:

It's a beautifully designed local car with a retro body on it, so it appeals to people who want a car which looks like the old 60s-style sports car, but underneath it's two-thirds the weight of a Holden VE SS (Commodore)

== See also ==
- Daytona Coupe
- Superformance
