= Denny Hulme Memorial Trophy =

A Denny Hulme Memorial Trophy is named in honour of Denny Hulme, a successful racing driver from New Zealand who died in 1992; trophies include:

- Denny Hulme Memorial Trophy (Targa Tasmania), awarded at the end of the Targa Tasmania rally
- NZ Motor Cup: Denny Hulme Memorial Trophy, awarded in the Toyota Racing Series
