= 2008 Targa Tasmania =

Seasons
- ← 2007 2009 →

The 2008 Targa Tasmania was the seventeenth running of the five-day Tarmac Rally event. It was held between 15 April 2008 and 20 April 2008 on 38 competitive closed road stages in the state of Tasmania, Australia. It was contested by over 300 competitors breaking the previous record field for the five-day format of 291 in 2002 and 2004.

== Stages ==
Prologue
Number	Name	Description	Length
TS00	Georgetown	Town stage run on the streets of Georgetown.	04.82 km
Leg 1
TS01	Entally		05.62 km
TS02	Deloraine		08.44 km
TS03	Reedy Marsh		04.99 km
TS04	Paradise		14.48 km
TS05	Nookville		05.33 km
TS06	Harford		05.50 km
TS07	Frankford		07.70 km
TS08	Kayena		06.60 km
TS09	Beaconsfield	Town stage run on the streets of Beaconsfield.	02.20 km
Leg 2
TS10	Sideling		43.82 km
TS11	Ledgerwood		05.29 km
TS12	Moorina		07.70 km
TS13	Weldborough		13.20 km
TS14	Pyengana		06.60 km
TS15	Elephant Saddle		11.00 km
TS16	Rossarden		11.70 km
TS17	Longford	Town stage run on the streets of Longford.	02.86 km
Leg 3
TS18	High Plains		04.40 km
TS19	Dunorlan		08.80 km
TS20	Merseylea		09.90 km
TS21	Devonport	City stage run on the streets of East Devonport.	02.77 km
TS22	Paloona		16.04 km
TS23	Mt. Claude		09.86 km
TS24	Liena		10.86 km
TS25	Caveside		04.40 km
Leg 4
TS26	Mole Creek		04.40 km
TS27	Cethana		37.48 km
TS28	Gunns Plains		14.68 km
TS29	South Riana		24.48 km
TS30	Hellyer Gorge		15.42 km
TS31	Bastyn Dam		05.50 km
TS32	Reece Dam		29.25 km
Leg 5
TS33	Strahan		33.24 km
TS34	Queenstown		06.39 km
TS35	Mt. Arrowsmith		47.24 km
TS36	Tungatinah		08.67 km
TS37	Risdon Brook		07.70 km
TS38	Hobart	Second of only 2 southern stages, run on the Queens Domain just outside the state capital Hobart.	01.36 km

== Results ==
=== Modern Competition ===
Pos	No	Driver	Navigator	Vehicle	Class	Capacity	Total Time	Margin
1.	975	(Australia) Glenney	(Australia) Webb	2003 Mitsubishi Lancer Evo 9	CM22	3396	07:35	00:00
2.	919	(Australia) Richards	(Australia) Oliver	2008 Porsche 911 GT2	CM14	6120	09:06	01:31
3.	993	(Australia) Herridge	(Australia) Macneall	2007 Subaru Impreza WRX STi	CM22	3396	09:53	02:18
4.	972	(Australia) Vandersee	(Australia) Kelley	2007 Skelta G-Force	CM11	1997	09:57	02:22
5.	947	(Australia) Vandenberg	(Australia) Vandenberg	2006 Mitsubishi Lancer Evo 9	CM22	3397	10:20	02:45

=== Classic Competition ===
Pos	No	Driver	Navigator	Vehicle	Class	Capacity	Total Time	Margin
1.	577	(Australia) Broadbent	(Australia) Lilleyman	1974 Porsche 911 Carrera RS	5C3E	3384	17:22	00:00
2.	736	(Australia) James	(Australia) McLeod	1989 Porsche 944 S2	AM32	2999	18:47	01:25
3.	573	(Australia) Eames	(Australia) Logan	1974 Porsche 911 Carrera RS	5C3E	3498	18:51	01:29
4=.	413	(Australia) Coad	(Australia) Coad	1971 Holden Monaro GTS	4C3H	6000	21:24	04:02
4=.	465	(Australia) Siddins	(Australia) Ferguson	1970 Datsun 240Z	4C3D	2785	21:24	04:02

=== Rookie Rallye Modern Competition ===
Pos	No	Driver	Navigator	Vehicle	Class	Capacity	Total Time	Margin
1.	127	(Australia) Bradford	(Australia) Huggins	1999 Subaru Impreza WRX STi	CM22	3400	07:00	00:00
2.	133	(Australia) Nicholls	(Australia) Locket	2003 Holden Commodore Ute	CM34	5700	07:45	00:45
3.	144	(Australia) Waldon	(Australia) Catt	1999 Subaru Impreza WRX STi R	CM42	3400	08:29	01:29
4.	130	(Australia) Summers	(Australia) Anesbury	2007 Porsche 911 GT3 RS	CM13	3600	09:16	02:16
5.	129	(Australia) Finlayson	(Australia) Ferguson	2000 Mitsubishi Lancer Evo 6.5	CM22	3396	09:40	02:40

=== Rookie Rallye Classic Competition ===
Pos	No	Driver	Navigator	Vehicle	Class	Capacity	Total Time	Margin
1.	115	(Australia) Griffiths	(Australia) Griffiths	1989 Nissan Skyline GTS-t	AM32	3397	14:09	00:00
2.	105	(Australia) Silluzio	(Australia) Franzi	1974 Porsche 911	5C2D	2800	16:11	02:02
3.	109	(Australia) Woodman	(Australia) Kastelic	1977 Holden Torana A9X	6C3G	5760	16:23	02:14
4.	117	(Australia) Poulter	(Australia) Gow	1965 Datsun Bluebird SSS	3C2B	1719	16:58	02:49
5.	102	(Australia) Smith	(Australia) Kirkby	1975 Toyota Celica 1600GT	5C3A	1598	17:39	03:30

== Controversy ==
=== Targa racers just 'hoons and bandits' ===
Angry Hobart aldermen branded Targa Tasmania as "organised hooning" and its competitors "environmental bandits". Eva Ruzicka and Bill Harvey came out firing in their decision not to approve a proposed Targa stage on the Domain in April. Targa boss Mark Perry said if the Domain stage did not go ahead, there would be no plans for a 2009 stage. The council refused to agree on a night stage in 2007 and the Domain stage was axed.

=== Skelta robbed of Targa podium ===
Vandersee/Kelley were penalised for stopping to offer assistance to the crew of a crashed car near lunchtime on day four. This penalty ultimately cost the Skelta team its first podium in the Targa Tasmania tarmac event. The seven second penalty ultimately pushed the hard charging team to a four-second deficit behind the Subaru crew of Dean Herridge and Glenn McNeal.
