= John Cooper Works =

British car marque

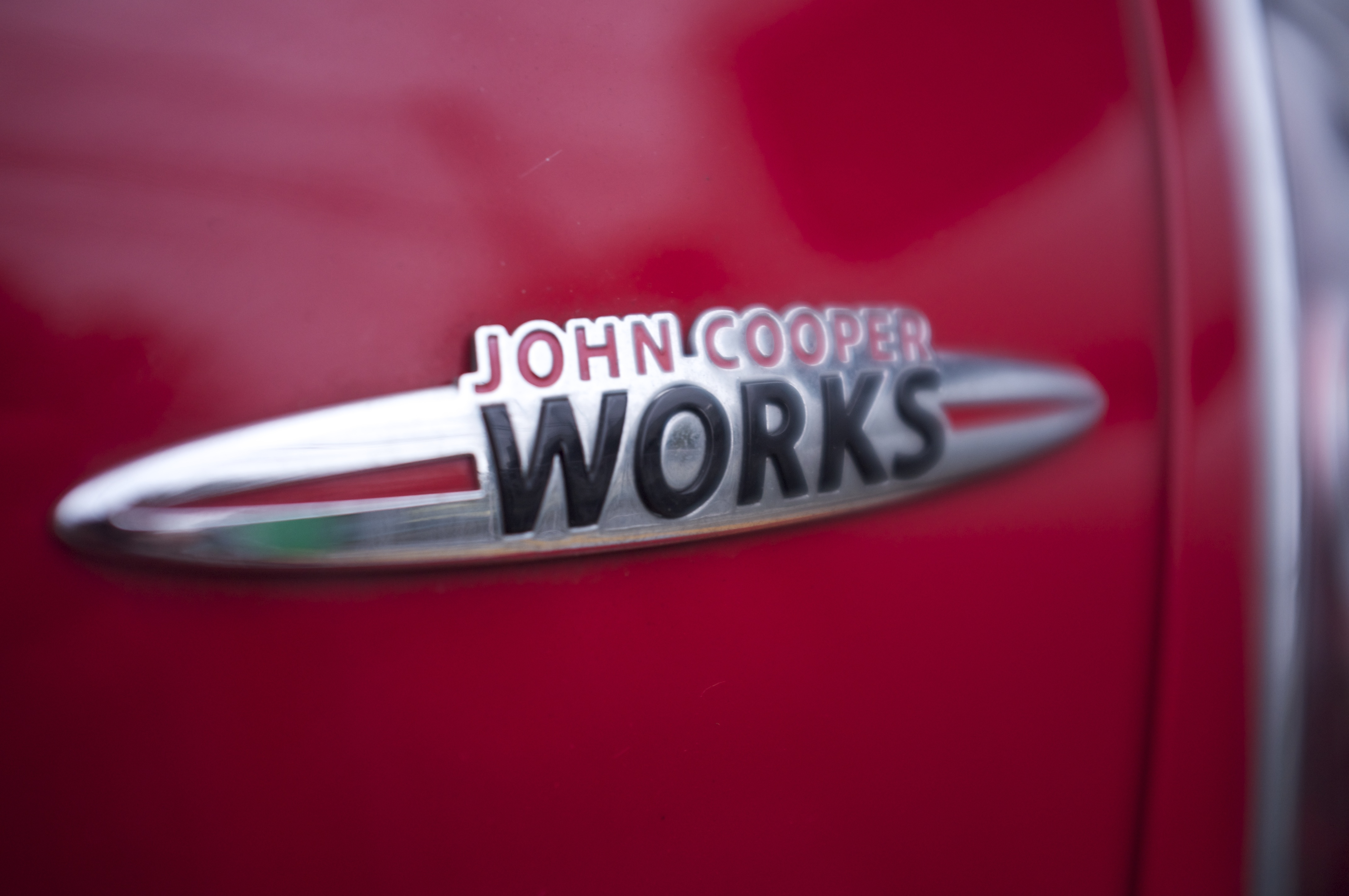
- Product type: Performance engines and cars; Automotive sports accessories
- Current owner: BMW
- Produced by: BMW
- Country: United Kingdom
- Introduced: 2002
- Related brands: Mini
- Previous owners: John Cooper Garages
- Website: mini.com/jcw

John Cooper Works (JCW) is a British car marque for in-house tuning, development, and international automotive racing division of Mini vehicles, based in Farnbororugh, Hampshire, England. It was founded in 2002 by Michael Cooper, son of John Cooper, the racing car maker and tuner responsible for the original Mini Cooper.

In 2007, German automaker BMW acquired the rights to the name, and it bought out the company in 2008.

== JCW Tuning ==
=== Cooper R50 ===
The first ever JCW kit was a 126 bhp (94 kW) upgrade for the R50 Mini Cooper. The kit consisted of the following components:

- Flowed and ported cylinder head
- Air filter
- Cover injection tube
- Uprated exhaust (from the catalytic converter back)
- Remapped ECU
- Decorative emblems

Despite its price tag of over €2000, this kit only offered a power increase of 11 bhp (8.2 kW), a sportier exhaust note and a crisper throttle response. The main advantage was that these improvements, though fairly minor, could be made to the Cooper without jeopardizing the factory warranty. In 2004, as the Cooper S was release, JCW discontinued the Cooper kit and introduced a Sound Kit for the Cooper. The Sound Kit consisted of a unique air intake system, cat-back exhaust and an ECU remap.

=== Cooper S R52 and R53 ===
The first JCW Tuning Kit to be made available for the Cooper S was an upgrade for the Cooper S, producing a total of 200 bhp (150 kW). Released in 2003, the kit consisted of the following components:

- Uprated cylinder head, gas-flowed and ported
- 11% Reduction of the supercharger pulley size, making the same supercharger spin faster for a particular engine speed
- 1-step colder, Colder Temperature Range spark plugs
- Uprated exhaust system (maintaining the same header and catalytic converter)
- Remapped ECU
- Decorative badges, individually numbered engine plate and certificate signed by Mike Cooper

At the time, the kit could not be factory-ordered, but had to be retrofitted at a Mini dealers or from John Cooper Works themself based in West Sussex, but from late 2005 the Cooper S could be ordered with the upgrade straight from BMWs factory.

In late July 2004, a vastly improved 210 package was launched that increased power further to 210 bhp (160 kW), with the following components:

- Uprated injectors (380cc/min instead of 330 cc/min)
- Remapped ECU for the injectors
- Uprated air intake system and air filter with vacuum controlled flap
- 200 & 210 versions came with 2 A4 sized certificates one for installation and the other for authenticity as now in 2022 provenance is very important

A "JCW Sound Kit" (Cooper) was made available at the same time, consisting of the cat-back exhaust and the air filter, giving a sportier exhaust note and a 3 bhp (2.2 kW) power increase for around €1100.

=== Cooper S R55, R56 and R57 ===
In 2007, Mini released the JCW tuning kit for the new "R56" version of the car. This new version now being turbocharged as opposed to supercharged, the kit itself is very different from that of the previous Cooper S. Consisting of an uprated induction system, exhaust and ECU remap, this kit raises power 17 bhp (13 kW) to 192 bhp (143 kW). The torque figure climbs 10 Nm to 250 Nm (270 Nm with overboost). Acceleration from 0–100 km/h (0-62 mph) is now 6.8 seconds, and a top speed of 232 km/h (144 mph) is now possible. This kit is commonly referred to as the "Stage 1 Kit", although this nomenclature has never been officially employed by JCW or by BMW.

According to Mike Cooper, this kit would create "the fastest Mini ever produced" above all due to the extra torque and in-gear acceleration, which in certain driving situations will be even faster than the 218 bhp (163 kW) Mini JCW GP.

In 2011, the JCW tuning kit was updated for the Cooper S LCI (135 kW). The kit consists of an uprated exhaust (cat-back), intake system, exhaust manifold and an ECU remap. The tuning kit includes a small plaque with a unique serial number mounted on the engine, as well as front and rear JCW emblems. The power is increased 12 kW from the standard 135 kW to 147 kW.

=== Factory John Cooper Works R56 ===
In mid-2008, Mini brought out a new addition to the JCW family - the Mini John Cooper Works. This is in fact not another power kit, but a whole new version of the R56 Mini Hatch, model code MF91 (MM91 in the Clubman version). This new version comes with major differences from the factory, compared to the 192 bhp (143 kW) power kit that can be supplied through the dealer network:

- Maximum power of 155 kW (208 bhp) at 6000 rpm, and 260 Nm of torque (280 with overboost). This is achieved by means of a new, uprated turbocharger, larger-bore exhaust and a sportier ECU map. 0–100 km/h time is down to 6.3 seconds (6.6 in the case of the Clubman). Fuel consumption and emissions are also up, however, compared to the 192 bhp (143 kW) kit which has no change compared to the standard 175 bhp (130 kW) Cooper S.
- Electronic limited-slip differential (EDLC - Electronic Differential Lock Control). This is infinitely variable between 0% and 50%, as opposed to the permanent 30% of the optional LSD fitted to the R56 MINI Cooper S.
- DTC (Dynamic Traction Control) as fitted as standard on all current BMW models. The John Cooper Works is the first variant of the Mini to come with DTC which, to date, is not available even as an option on other variants. The main difference between DTC and the existent DSC is the ability to "remap" the parameters for the traction and stability control systems, to allow a sportier drive while still employing these systems at the last minute, without fully deactivating them.
- Brembo 4 pot caliper JCW brakes, consisting of: four-piston aluminium fixed front brake calipers finished in red with John Cooper Works logo, red painted single piston rear calipers, perforated and grooved ventilated front brake discs (316x22mm or 12.44x0.87in), rear brake discs (280x10mm or 11x0.39in)

=== 2013 Factory John Cooper Works GP ===
Commonly referred to as the GP2, the 2013 John Cooper Works GP is a limited-edition, track-oriented version of the regular John Cooper Works hatchback based loosely on the JCW Challenge race car. Production was limited to 2000 units worldwide. The GP2 has a 218-hp (214 for US models) turbo-charged 1.6 L direct-injected four cylinder engine, giving it a 0–60 mph time of 6.1 seconds and a top speed of 150 mph. The engine is essentially identical to the N18 used in other 2013 John Cooper Works models, with a slight increase in compression accounting for the modest power gain. In keeping with its uncompromising roots, a 6-speed manual gearbox was the only transmission offered. The GP2 also features exclusive 17-inch wheels, high-performance tires designed in a special partnership with Kumho, adjustable coil over suspension with revised geometry unique to the GP, 6-piston Brembo front calipers borrowed from the BMW 135i, a full valance tray and functional rear diffuser, a hatch-mounted spoiler with carbon fiber element, red mirror caps, brake ducts, signature badging, a pair of special-edition Recaro sport seats (complete with side-impact airbags), and deletion of the rear seats to save weight. The stability control suite features an additional "GP mode" exclusive to this model which permits a greater degree of wheel-slip while retaining function of the brake-based electronic limited-slip differential. The 500 examples sold in the US originally retailed for $39,950 and were available in only one configuration.

Notable racing history:

- MINI has confirmed it lapped the Nürburgring-Nordschleife track in 8 minutes and 23 seconds - an improvement over the previous GP model by 19 seconds.
- John Hume Sr won the 2014 Targa Newfoundland Grand Touring division in a GP2, and again in 2017.

=== 2015 Factory John Cooper Works ===
MotorPress.ca reviewed the F56 JCW and gave it a rating of 8.3 out of 10, praising its driving characteristics and mighty engine. The JCW is a powerhouse.

=== Countryman ===
The John Cooper Works Countryman is the first 5-door JCW from Mini that unveiled at the 2012 Geneva Motor Show. The North American debut of the Countryman JCW was unveiled at the 2012 New York Auto Show.
