= Australian Targa Championship =

Motorsport competition

- Category: Tarmac Rally
- Country: Australia
- Inaugural season: 2012
- Drivers' champion: (Australia) White
- Constructors' champion: Lamborghini Gallardo
- Official website: www.targa.com.au

Australian Targa Championship is a tarmac-based rally Championship held in Australia annually. The inaugural event was held in 2012. The championship takes place on closed public roads, with a variety of sports cars competing across three states.

== Events ==
- Targa Tasmania – Tasmania, Australia
- Targa Adelaide – South Australia, Australia
- Targa High Country – Victoria, Australia
- Targa Wrest Point – Tasmania, Australia

== List of past winners ==
=== Modern Competition ===
Year	Driver	Navigator	Vehicle
2012	(Australia) White	(Australia) White	Lamborghini Gallardo Superleggera

=== Classic Competition ===
Year	Driver	Navigator	Vehicle
2012	(Australia) Todd	(Australia) Tighe	1971 Ford Capri Perana
