= Daytona Coupe =

Daytona Coupe may refer to:

- Shelby Cobra Daytona Coupe, one of six race cars designed by Peter Brock and made by Carroll Shelby during the 1960s.
- Superformance Shelby Cobra Daytona Coupe (SPF Coupe), designed by Peter Brock, also known as the "Brock Coupe" (no relation to the Australian race driver of the same name). The Brock Coupe is the only Shelby-licensed continuation of the original Shelby Daytona.
- Borland Racing's Daytona Sportscar, sometimes referred to as a "Daytona Coupe", is an Australian-made lookalike of the original Shelby Daytona. The Daytona Sportscar is notable for being the car that Australian motoracing driver, Peter Brock, died in.
- Ferrari Daytona, (correctly named the 365 GTB/4) a Ferrari GT produced between 1968 and 1973.
