= 2001 Targa Tasmania =

Seasons
- ← 2000 2002 →

The 2001 Targa Tasmania was the tenth running of the Tarmac Rally event and saw the event extended to a six-day format to mark the decade milestone. It was held between 18 April 2001 and 24 April 2001 on 54 competitive closed road stages in the state of Tasmania, Australia.

== Stages ==
Prologue
| Number | Name | Description | Length |
|---|---|---|---|
| TS00 | Georgetown | Town stage run on the streets of Georgetown. | km |
Leg 1
| TS01 | Legana | | km |
| TS02 | Moriarty | | km |
| TS03 | Latrobe | | km |
| TS04 | Devonport | | km |
| TS05 | Nook | | km |
| TS06 | Sheffield | | km |
| TS07 | Glengarry | | km |
| TS08 | Deviot | | km |
| TS09 | Hillwood | | km |
| TS10 | Lilydale | | km |
Leg 2
| TS11 | Sideling | | km |
| TS12 | Derby | | km |
| TS13 | Winnaleah | | km |
| TS14 | Weldborough Pass | | km |
| TS15 | Pyengana | | km |
| TS16 | Elephant Pass | Run in Reverse | km |
| TS17 | Symmons Plains | Returned after a hiatus since the 1994 event. | km |
| TS18 | Longford | Town stage run on the streets of Longford. | km |
Leg 3
| TS19 | Quamby Brook | | km |
| TS20 | Deloraine | Run in Reverse | km |
| TS21 | High Plains | Run in Reverse | km |
| TS22 | Montana | Run in Reverse | km |
| TS23 | Mole Creek | Run in Reverse | km |
| TS24 | Cethana | | km |
| TS25 | Wilmot | | km |
| TS26 | Gunns Plains | | km |
| TS27 | South Riana | The previous Riana stage split into 2 stages, this and Natone. | km |
| TS28 | Natone | The previous Riana stage split into 2 stages, this and South Riana. | km |
Leg 4
| TS29 | Hellyer Gorge | | km |
| TS30 | Mount Black | | km |
| TS31 | Rosebery | | km |
| TS32 | Strahan | | km |
| TS33 | Queenstown | | km |
| TS34 | Mount Arrowsmith | | km |
| TS35 | Tarraleah | | km |
| TS36 | Ellendale | | km |
| TS37 | New Norfolk | | km |
Leg 5
| TS38 | Hobart | | km |
| TS39 | Richmond | New Stage | km |
| TS40 | Runnymede | New Stage | km |
| TS41 | Triabunna | | km |
| TS42 | Rocky Hills | Run in Reverse | km |
| TS43 | Lake Leake | | km |
| TS44 | Ross | | km |
| TS45 | Colebrook | Run in Reverse | km |
| TS46 | Grasstree Hill | | km |
Leg 6
| TS47 | Mount Nelson | | km |
| TS48 | Howden | | km |
| TS49 | Oyster Cove | | km |
| TS50 | Woodbridge | | km |
| TS51 | Cygnet | | km |
| TS52 | Longley | | km |
| TS53 | Ridgeway Park | | km |
| TS54 | Bonnet Hill | New Stage | km |

== Results ==
=== Modern Competition ===
| Pos | No | Driver | Navigator | Vehicle | Class | Capacity | Total Time | Margin |
|---|---|---|---|---|---|---|---|---|
| 1. | | (Australia) Richards | (Australia) Oliver | 2000 Porsche 911 Turbo | | | | 00:00 |
| 2. | | (Australia) Quinn | (Australia) Wenn | 2000 Porsche 911 GT3 | | | | |
| 3. | | (Australia) Dean | (Australia) Bell | 1998 Toyota Supra RZ | | | | |
| 4. | | (Australia) Bates | (Australia) Taylor | 1999 Lexus IS200 | | | | |
| 5. | | (Australia) Lintott | (Australia) Jackson | 2000 Porsche 911 Turbo | | | | |

=== Classic Competition ===
| Pos | No | Driver | Navigator | Vehicle | Class | Capacity | Total Time | Margin |
|---|---|---|---|---|---|---|---|---|
| 1. | | (Australia) Stuart | (Australia) Connolly | 1974 Porsche 911 Carrera | | | | 00:00 |
| 2. | | (Australia) Duggan | (Australia) Duggan | 1969 Datsun 2000 Sports | | | | |
| 3. | | (Australia) Morris | (Australia) Crib | 1981 Alfa Romeo GTV | | | | |
| 4. | | (Australia) Freestone | (Australia) Freestone | 1958 Austin-Healey BN4 | | | | |
| 5. | | (Australia) Merrgozzi | (Australia) Fairclough | 1969 Marcos 3000 GT | | | | |

=== Historic Competition ===
| Pos | No | Driver | Navigator | Vehicle | Class | Capacity | Total Time | Margin |
|---|---|---|---|---|---|---|---|---|
| 1. | | (Australia) Cocks | (Australia) Fong | 1926 Bugatti Type 35B | | | | 00:00 |
| 2. | | (Australia) Lane | (Australia) Lane | 1931 Bugatti Type 51B | | | | |
| 3. | | (Australia) Lawson | (Australia) Lawson | 1938 Alfa Romeo MM S | | | | |
| 4. | | (Australia) Fitzpatrick | (Australia) Weinberger | 1936 Delage D6/70 Le Mans | | | | |
| 5. | | (Australia) Gowing | (Australia) McGrath | 1939 Jaguar SS | | | | |
