= Denny Hulme Memorial Trophy (Targa Tasmania) =

- Presented by: John Large, Targa Tasmania
- Reward: Trophy
- First award: 1993

The Denny Hulme Memorial Trophy is a motorsport honour awarded to the competitor who exhibits tenacity to overcome adversity while completing the Targa Tasmania. The award was first made in 1993.

The award is named in honour of Denny Hulme, a successful New Zealand driver who died in 1992. During that year, he lost the first Targa Tasmania by only 9 seconds to Greg Crick despite competing furiously and having to overcome a number of obstacles that lesser drivers would have baulked at. He was never to return to the event. The day before he died, he commented enthusiastically to the Targa Tasmania founder, John Large, looking forward to the next year's event. John chose to honour the driver by naming the trophy for him and presenting it at the next Targa Tasmania.

Throughout his career, Denny Hulme had earned a reputation for being a fierce competitor and rarely giving up - epitomised by his persistent attempts to claim the win during the 1992 event. So to qualify for the award, a driver must "overcome extreme hardship and adversity throughout the entire event and must cross the finish line on the Sunday night in Hobart".

== Recipients ==
- 2007 Chris Bowden and Robert van Wegen
- 2008 Adrian Morrisby and David French
- 2009 Philip Blake and John Blake
- 2010 Paul Freestone and Christine Freestone
- 2011 Adam Kaplan and David Kaplan
- 2012 Dennis Sims and Matthew Sims
- 2014 Drew Kent and Ella Kent
- 2016 Oliver Sellars and Michal Zdunek
