= Targa West =

Rally event in Western Australia

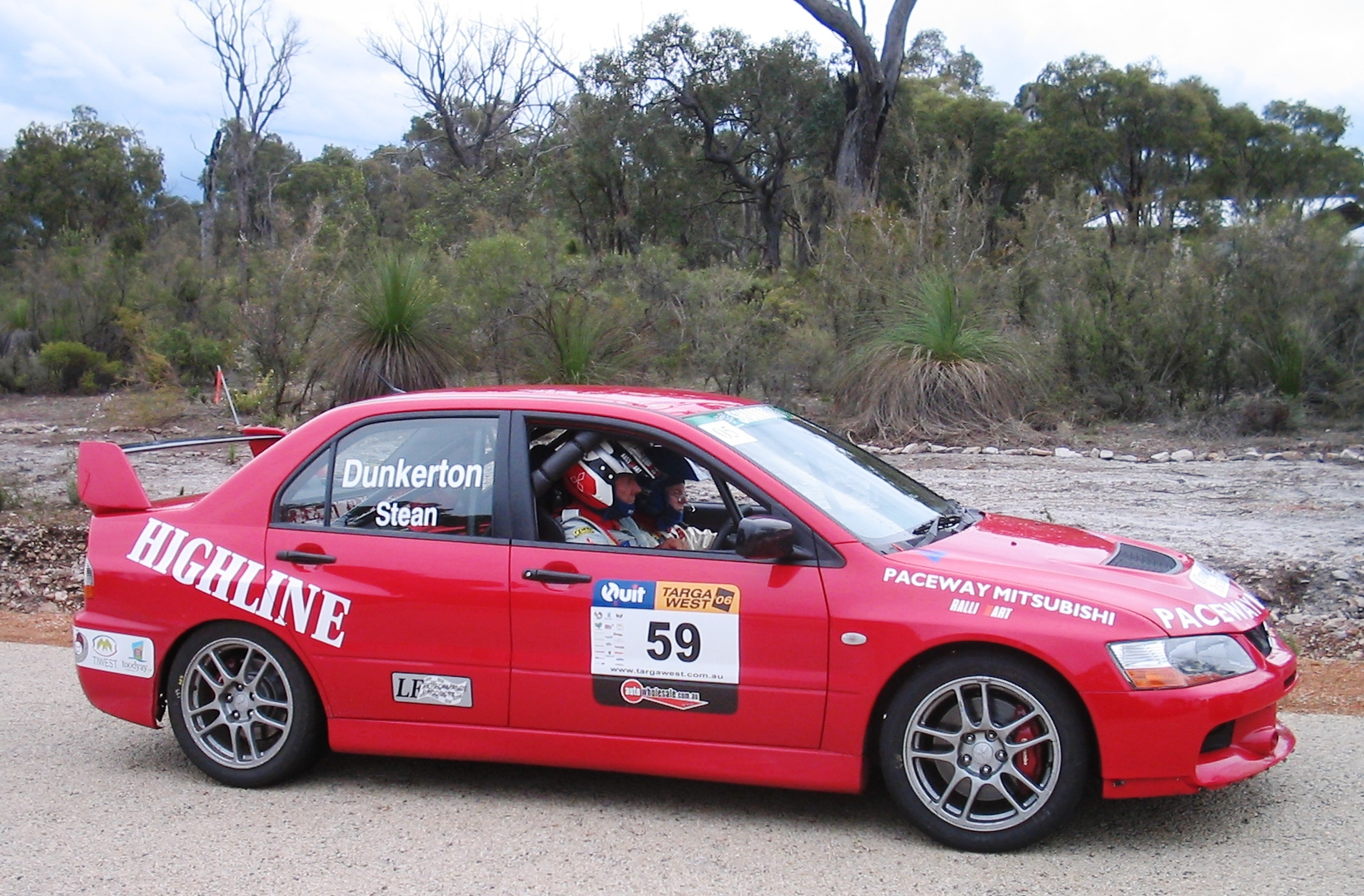
Winner of both the 2005 and 2006 events, Ross Dunkerton in the 2006 rally

Tarmac West (formerly Targa West) is a rally event held in and around Perth, Western Australia. The event takes its name from the Targa Florio, a former motoring event held on the island of Sicily, as well as more recent Australian events including Targa Tasmania and Targa New Zealand.

The inaugural event was held in 2005 and won by Ross Dunkerton. Dunkerton also won the 2006 event which ran for four days from 7 September 2006 in a Mitsubishi Lancer EVO IX.

== 2006 ==
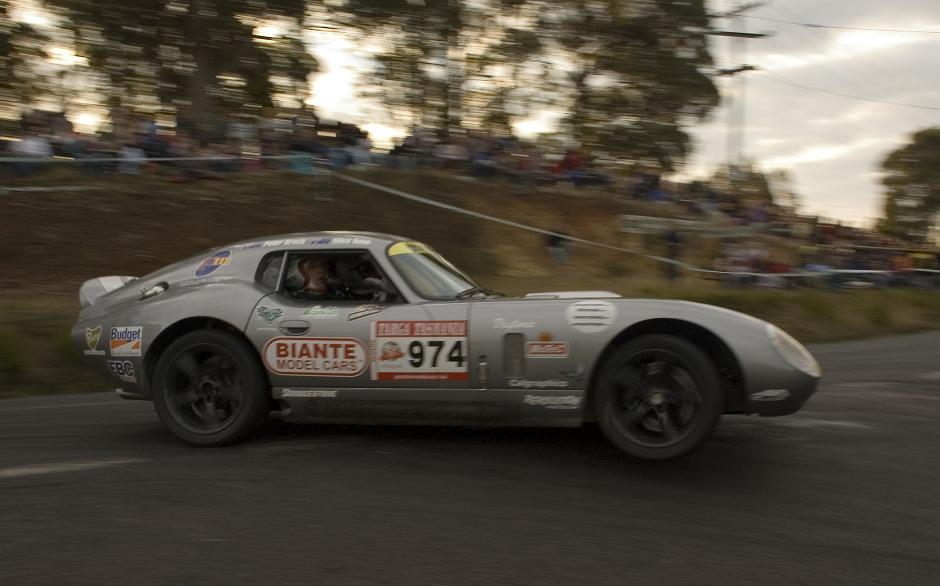
Daytona Sportscar that Peter Brock died in

After the official start at Forrest Place in the Perth central business district, special stages were held in John Forrest National Park, Gidgegannup, Araluen, Muchea, Chittering, Bindoon and Toodyay.

76 teams entered in one of two classes: Challenge (cars without roll cages) and Competition.

The 2006 event was marred by the death of Peter Brock who lost control of his Daytona Sportscar and crashed into a tree in the second stage of the event near Gidgegannup 40 km (25 mi) north-east of Perth at 11.50am on 8 September 2006. Co-driver Mick Hone was taken to Royal Perth Hospital and made a recovery.

== 2026 ==
The 2026 event marked 20 years since the death of Peter Brock.

70 teams entered the event being the largest field since the 2018 edition. Stages were held in Whiteman Park, Ellenbrook, Parkerville, Kalamunda, The Bullsbrook area, Toodyay, Malaga, and Langley Park in central Perth.

Throughout the event, 4 stages were canceled due to heavy crashes and limited time. The first Whiteman Park stage was also not included in the results with it being used as a shakedown stage.

The event was won overall by Peter Rullo and Steve Glenney driving a Porsche 992 RGT with a total time of 1:20:10.600 winning by 25.100 seconds ahead of Heuson Bak and Rogers Tan driving a Lotus Exige S 350.

V8 SuperUtes driver, Anthony Jewell, made his rallying debut in this event driving a Toyota Supra ran by the German Motorwerks team along side Rachael Ferrante as Co-Driver. Australian cricket star Brad Hogg also debuted in the TSD (Time-Speed-Distance) category coming 3rd along side Lachlan White as Co-Driver in a 2016 BMW M140i.

Itinerary
| Date | No. | Time | Stage name | Distance |
|---|---|---|---|---|
| 17 September | | 12:30 | Opening Ceremony, Forrest Place | |
| 17 September | SS1 | 13:23 | Whiteman Park East 1 | 3.76 km |
| 17 September | SS2 | 14:01 | Whiteman Park East 2 | 3.76 km |
| 17 September | | 14:36 | Whiteman Park Village Service A | |
| 17 September | SS3 | 15:24 | Whiteman Park West 1 | 3.27 km |
| 17 September | SS4 | 16:02 | Whiteman Park West 2 | 3.27 km |
| 17 September | | 16:27 | Whiteman Park Village Service B | |
| 17 September | SS5 | 18:10 | Ellenbrook Toyota 1 | 0.71 km |
| 17 September | | 18:18 | Ellenbrook Minor Service C | |
| 17 September | SS6 | 18:18 | Ellenbrook Toyota 2 | 0.71 km |
| 17 September | | 18:26 | Ellenbrook Minor Service D | |
| 17 September | SS7 | 18:26 | Ellenbrook Toyota 3 | 0.71 km |
| 18 September | SS8 | 10:03 | Parkerville 1 | 5.81 km |
| 18 September | SS9 | 10:46 | Parkerville 2 | 5.81 km |
| 18 September | SS10 | 11:24 | Kalamunda East 1 | 15.71 km |
| 18 September | SS11 | 12:32 | Kalamunda East 2 | 15.71 km |
| 18 September | | 12:53 | Kalamunda Minor Service E | |
| 18 September | SS12 | 14:00 | Zig Zag 1 | 2.76 km |
| 18 September | | 14:15 | Kalamunda Minor Service F | |
| 18 September | SS13 | 14:42 | Zig Zag 2 | 2.76 km |
| 18 September | SS14 | 15:45 | Yarrimbah 1 | 3.51 km |
| 18 September | SS15 | 16:15 | Yarrimbah 2 | 3.51 km |
| 18 September | SS16 | 16:47 | Yarrimbah 3 | 3.51 km |
| 18 September | | 17:07 | Bullsbrook Service G | |
| 18 September | | 18:41 | Forrest Place Show and Shine | |
| 19 September | SS17 | 9:08 | Racecourse 1 | 7.09 km |
| 19 September | | 9:28 | Toodyay Service H | |
| 19 September | SS18 | 10:01 | Racecourse 2 | 7.09 km |
| 19 September | SS19 | 10:33 | Coondle West (Conostylis) | 4.36 km |
| 19 September | | 10:55 | Toodyay Service I | |
| 19 September | SS20 | 11:38 | Toodyay 1 | 8.80 km |
| 19 September | SS21 | 12:09 | Coondle West (Darwinia) | 4.45 km |
| 19 September | SS22 | 12:42 | Toodyay 2 | 8.80 km |
| 19 September | | 13:02 | Toodyay Service J | |
| 19 September | SS23 | 14:24 | Pragma Lawyers Maryville 1 | 18.74 km |
| 19 September | SS24 | 15:08 | Pragma Lawyers Maryville 2 | 18.74 km |
| 19 September | SS25 | 15:58 | Bullsbrook Water Carriers Short 1 | 9.24 km |
| 19 September | SS26 | 16:19 | Bullsbrook Water Carriers Long 1 | 11.31 km |
| 19 September | SS27 | 16:43 | Bullsbrook Water Carriers Short 2 | 9.24 km |
| 19 September | SS28 | 17:04 | Bullsbrook Water Carriers Long 2 | 11.31 km |
| 19 September | | 17:28 | Bullsbrook Service K | |
| 20 September | SS29 | 8:38 | Tokyo Motorsports Malaga 1 | 5.85 km |
| 20 September | | 9:28 | Malaga Service L | |
| 20 September | SS30 | 9:31 | Tokyo Motorsports Malaga 2 | 5.85 km |
| 20 September | | 10:21 | Malaga Service M | |
| 20 September | SS31 | 10:24 | Tokyo Motorsports Malaga 3 | 5.85 km |
| 20 September | | 11:14 | Parade Through Malaga Stage | |
| 20 September | SS32 | 13:14 | City of Perth 1 | 2.08 km |
| 20 September | | 13:14 | Tokyo Motorsports Minor Service N | |
| 20 September | SS33 | 14:04 | City of Perth 2 | 2.08 km |
| 20 September | | 14:04 | Tokyo Motorsports Minor Service O | |
| 20 September | SS34 | 14:54 | City of Perth 3 | 2.08 km |
| 20 September | | 16:00 | Podium Ceremony | |
