= Targa Newfoundland =

Rally race in Newfoundland, Canada

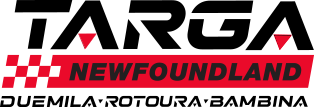
- Category: Rally
- Country: Newfoundland and Labrador, Canada
- Inaugural season: 2002
- Official website: http://targanfld.com/

Targa Newfoundland is a rally race held annually every September since 2002 in the province of Newfoundland and Labrador, Canada. It is the most prestigious tarmac rally in North America. The event covers about 2,000 km (1,200 mi) over scenic coastal roads and through towns and outports on eastern and central parts of the island of Newfoundland. The next Targa Newfoundland rally will be held September 11-18, 2025.

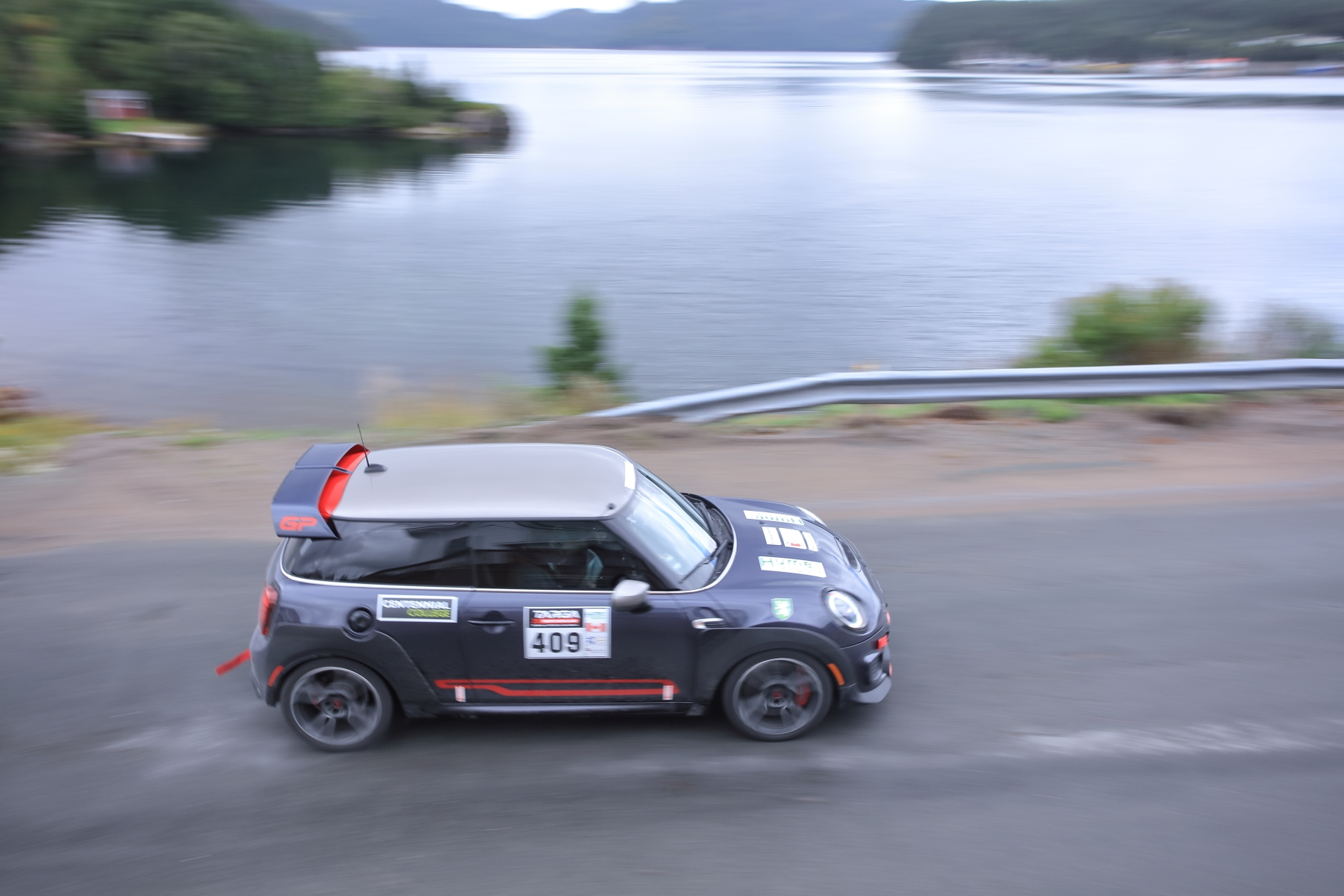
MINI JCW GP racing along a scenic coastal highway in Targa Newfoundland 2023.

The rally gives the owners of historic, classic and modern performance vehicles the opportunity to drive them the way they were designed to be driven in a rally competition. In the event, each team of driver and co-driver competes against itself on a handicap basis as well as against other vehicles.

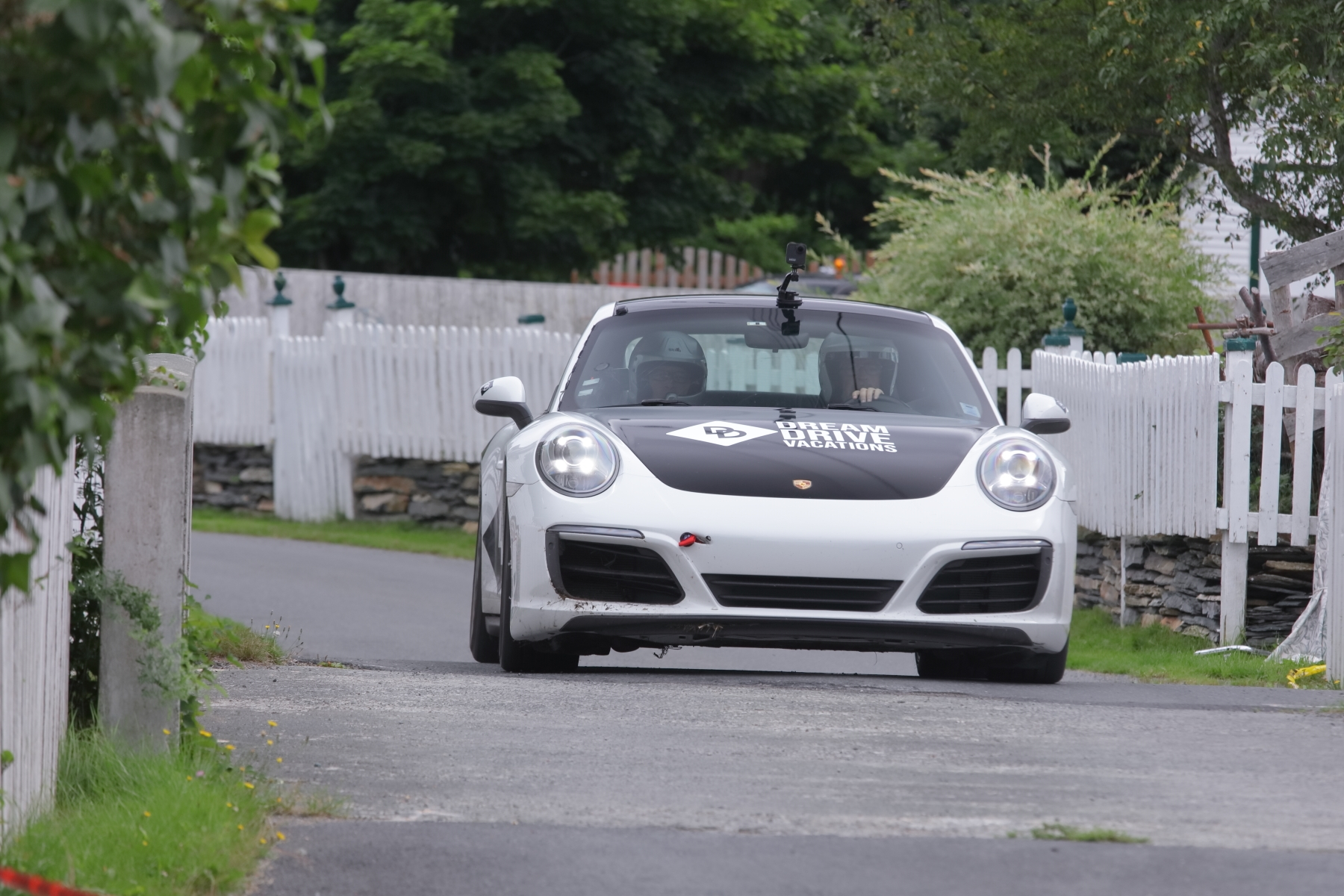
Porsche 911 at speed through the town of Brigus stage of Targa Newfoundland 2023.

Timed stages are run on public roads, which are closed to other traffic during this time. Some stages, such as Gander and Brigus, race through towns and outports.

Targa Newfoundland is divided into four divisions:

- Targa Tour, a non-competitive event which allows the owners of classic and exotic cars to drive them the way they were meant to be driven, within the limits prescribed by the event, without the stress of competition;
- Grand Touring, a time-speed-distance rally (TSD Rally) emphasizing precision in maintaining the average speed set by the organizers;
- Targa 1 and 2, competitive events where the objective is to meet or slightly better the stage times set by the organizers for the age, displacement and modification level of the vehicle. Targa 1 is for cars without roll cages while Targa 2 is for cars with roll cages. Every competitor who completes all stages within the established trophy times wins a Targa plate.

Trophies are awarded for overall placing in the Touring and Targa events, and for placing within the various categories within the Targa event. There are also trophies for national and marque teams, and for the best-placed novice team.

Targa Newfoundland is made possible though the efforts of dozens of volunteers and residents of 70+ Newfoundland communities.

== Event format ==
Targa Newfoundland begins and ends in the city of St. John's, Newfoundland and Labrador. This is the tentative format for the 2025 event (subject to changes):

- Skills Review and Practice Session – mandatory for 1st time entrants (September 11) – St. John's
- Stage Review – mandatory for all participants (September 12) – St. John's
- Prologue and Leg 1 (September 13) – Southern Shore - Bay Bulls and Witless Bay
- Leg 2 (September 14) – Placentia Bay – Southwest Avalon Peninsula: Placentia Bay, Cape Shore, St. Bride’s, Ship Harbour, Long Harbour, Gander
- Leg 3 (September 15) – Notre Dame Bay – North Central Newfoundland: Glenwood, Bobby’s Cove, Pleasantview, Point Leamington, Leading Tickles, Glovers Harbour, Appleton
- Leg 4 (September 16) – Bonavista Bay – Eastport Peninsula: Bonavista Bay, Eastport, Happy Adventure, Salvage, Burnside, Port Blandford
- Leg 5 (September 17) – Trinity Bay and Random Island: Weybridge, Hickman’s Harbour, Lower Lance Cove and Petley
- Leg 6 (September 18) – Conception Bay Central: Conception Harbour, Colliers, Marysvale, Turk's Gut, Georgetown, Brigus
- Free time and Awards Ceremony Banquet (September 19) – St. John's

== 2024 Targa Newfoundland Results ==
=== Overall Deumila - Targa 2 (cars with roll cages) ===
1st Place: Keir Pollard and Lance Campbell, 2006 MINI Cooper S

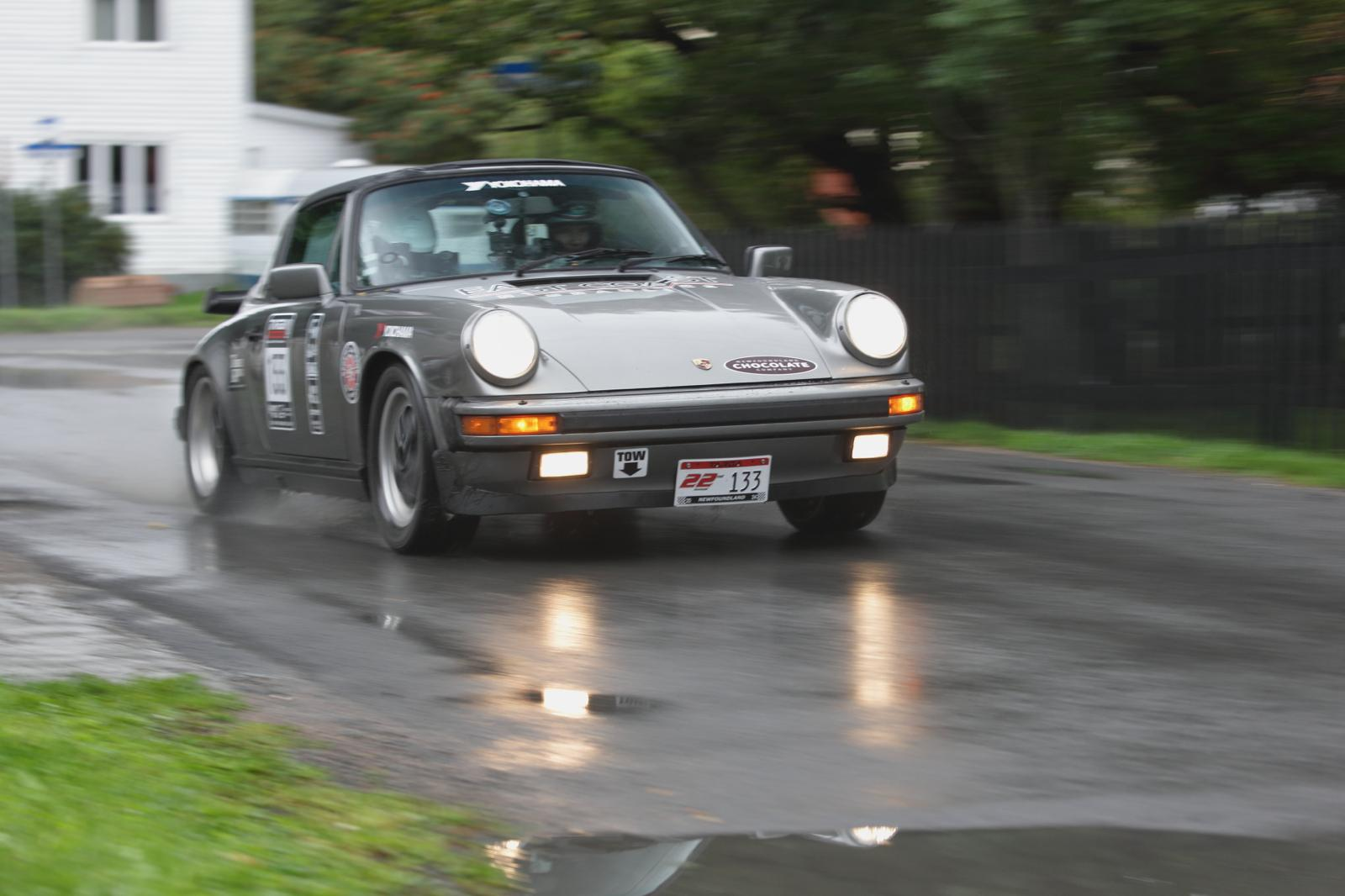
Randy Pobst and Paul Abbott in their Porsche 911 won the Targa 1 title in 2024.

=== Overall Deumila - Targa 1 (cars without roll cages) ===
1st Place: Randy Pobst, and Paul Abbott, 1989 Porsche 911 Targa

2nd Place: Robert Thompson and Justine Ronayne, 2020 Lachute Performance LP400S (Subaru WRX STI)

3rd Place: Justin Crant and Erin Crant, 2009 BMW 135i

== 2023 Targa Newfoundland Results ==
Targa Newfoundland paused from 2019 through 2022 and returned in 2023. Targa Divisions were renamed in 2023 and the results are reflected below.

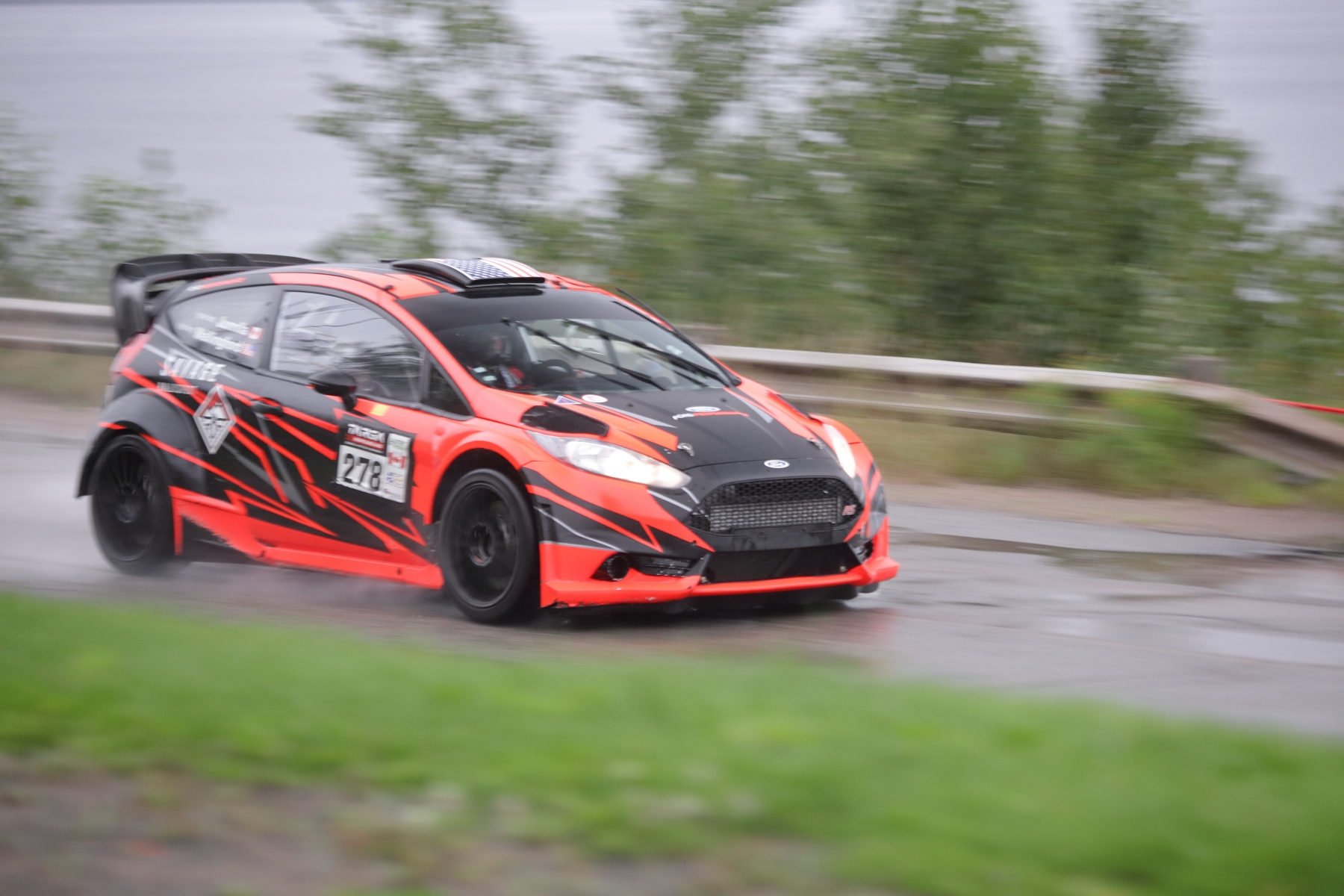
Dave Wallingford and co-driver Leanne Junnila claimed the Targa 2 title in their 2017 Ford Fiesta in 2023.

=== Overall Deumila - Targa 2 (cars with roll cages) ===
1st Place: #276 Dave Wallingford and Leanne Junnila, 2017 Ford Fiesta

2nd Place: #205 Jim Turner and Mark Russo, 1995 BMW 325

=== Overall Deumila - Targa 1 (cars without roll cages) ===
1st Place Modern 2WD: #133 John Hume Sr., Randy Pobst, and Craig MacMullen, 2013 MINI Cooper GP

2nd Place Modern 2WD: #135 Justin Crant and Erin Crant, 2009 BMW 135i

3rd Place Modern AWD: #132 Sam Marshall and Rick Marshall, 2016 Subaru WRX

=== Overall Duemila – Grand Touring ===
1st Place: #333 Satish Gopalkrishnan and Savera D’Souza, 2023 Mercedes-Benz AMG GLA 45

2nd Place: #380 Martin Pond and Christopher Seiwald, 1980 Mercury Zephyr

== List of past winners – Targa Division ==
Year	Driver	Navigator	Vehicle	Total Penalties
2002	(Australia) Len Cattlin	(Australia) Gayle Cattlin	1967 Ford Mustang Fastback	0:01:36
2003	(United States) Bill Arnold	(United States) Peter Guagenti	1972 BMW Bavaria	0:00:38
2004	(United States) Bill Arnold	(United States) Tamara Hull	1972 BMW Bavaria	0:00:10
2005	(United States) Bill Arnold	(Canada) Alan Ryall	1972 BMW Bavaria	0:00:45
2006	(Canada) Glen Clarke	(Canada) Evan Gamblin	1979 Porsche 911	0:02:30
2007	(United States) Roy Hopkins	(United States) Adrienne Hughes	1969 BMW 2002	0:01:46
2008	(United States) Roy Hopkins	(United States) Adrienne Hughes	1969 BMW 2002	0:00:25
2009	(United States) Roy Hopkins	(United States) Adrienne Hughes	1969 BMW 2002	0:00:10
2010	(Canada) Scott Giannou	(Canada) Ray Felice	1981 Porsche 911 SC	0:00:58
2011	(Canada) Scott Giannou	(Canada) Ray Felice	1981 Porsche 911 SC	0:01:04
2012	(Canada) Andrew Comrie-Picard	(Canada) Brian O'Kane	2006 Mitsubishi Evo IX	0:00:26
2013	(United States) Dan Aweida	(United States) Tina Aweida	2008 Ford Mustang FR500S	0:03:07
2014	(Canada) Matthew Oldford	(Canada) Brian Oldford	2004 Subaru WRX Sti	0:02:07
2015	(Canada) Jean Luc Bergeron	(Canada) Yvan Turcotte	1999 Subaru RS2	0:00:40
2016	(Canada) Ludovic Lognay	(Canada) Lauriane Lognay	2008 Subaru WRX Sti	0:00:12

2023 United States. Randy Pobst. Canada. Craig MacMullen. 2013 Mini GP 0:00.30. Targa 1

 2024. United States        Randy Pobst.     Canada              Paul Abbott.       1989 Porsche 911SC    0:00.05.  Targa 1
 2025  United States        Randy Pobst.     Canada              Paul Abbott        2013 Mini GP          0:00.30   Targa 1[1]

== List of past winners – Grand Touring Division ==
Year	Driver	Navigator	Vehicle	Total Penalties
2002	(Canada) Alan Ryall	(Canada) Carolyn Ryall	2002 Subaru Impreza WRX	0:00:00
2003	(Canada) Jean-Francois Drolet	(Canada) Rejean Beaulieu	2004 Infiniti G35 Coupe	0:00:00
2004	(Canada) Jean-Francois Drolet	(Canada) Rejean Beaulieu	2004 Infiniti G35 Coupe	0:00:04
2005	(Canada) Brian Crockatt	(Canada) Gail Walker	1987 BMW 535i	0:00:16
2006	(Canada) Bruce Terris	(Canada) Andy Proudfoot	1991 Subaru Legacy Turbo	0:00:06
2007	(Canada) Alan Kearley	(Canada) Greg Martin	2004 Mazda 3 Sport GT	0:00:18
2008	(Canada) John Vandemierden	(Canada) Stu Lehmann	2008 Lotus Elise	0:00:03
2009	(Canada) Ferdinand Trauttmansdorf	(Canada) Christoph Trauttmansdorff	1990 BMW 325i	0:00:00
2010	(United States) Alan Townsley	(United States) David Fuhrmann	2003 Acura RSX	0:00:02
2011	(Canada) Justin Crant	(Canada) Justin Russell	1997 VW Golf trek	0:00:00
2012	(Canada) John Hume Sr.	(Canada) Craig MacMullen	2011 BMW 335is	0:00:16
2013	(Canada) Jon Riddell	(Canada) Briar DeLange	2008 BMW 135i	0:00:14
2014	(Canada) John Hume Sr.	(Canada) Craig MacMullen	2013 Mini JCW GP	0:00:13
2015	(United States) Marinus Damm	(United States) Renee Damm	2012 BMW 328xiT	0:01:43
2016	(United States) Marinus Damm	(United States) Renee Damm	2001 Porsche 996	0:00:05
2017	(Canada) John Hume Sr	(Canada) Christina Kroner	2013 Mini JCW GP	0:00:22
2023	(India) Satish Gopalkrishnan	(India) Savera D'Souza	2023 Mercedes Benz GLA 45 AMG	0:00:17

== Event History ==
After competing in the Targa Tasmania in Australia in 2001, Canadian automotive journalist Jim Kenzie and public relations executive Doug Mepham were inspired to bring the excitement of that rally event closer to home. As Jim wrote in Toronto Star Wheels, “We got talking and thought: Island; welcoming population; needs tourism dollars. How about Targa Newfoundland?”

Kenzie wrote about the idea and Mepham sent the article to Robert Giannou, a businessman and racing enthusiast who had promoted Formula Atlantic races in St. John’s, Newfoundland and Labrador in the early 1970s. Giannou got the support of the provincial government and put the organization in place. A year-and-a-half later, Targa Newfoundland was born. Targa ran for the first time in 2002 and there have been 23 runnings of the famous road rally since then.

Robert Giannou was inducted into the Canadian Motorsport Hall of Fame Class of 2022 as a competitor, builder and significant contributor. Robert joined an elite group of more than 290 members who have been recognized for their contributions to motorsports in Canada.

Giannou joined the St. John’s Motor Club in 1958, where he began organizing rally, solo and hillclimb events in 1962. Giannou also raced himself, winning titles in club karting and rallying, hillclimb and B Sedan. He brought the club into the Canadian Automobile Sport Clubs (CASC) ranks and negotiated with the U.S. Embassy in Newfoundland to use two of their properties for events, including runways at Naval Station Argentia, where he eventually brought the Molyslip Endurance Series.

Giannou has held various roles with CASC over the years, including Race Director Atlantic Region and Assistant National Race Director, most notably starting Targa Newfoundland in 2002.

Without Robert’s vision and guidance, we wouldn’t have such an exceptional event today that challenges drivers, cars, and teams, and brings communities across the island of Newfoundland together for the love of motorsport. In 2010, he worked with Janet Brake to create a safety protocol that made Targa Newfoundland the safest of the three main Targa events, with incident rates reduced from 17% to 1.5%.
