= Targa Tasmania =

Motorsport competition in Australia

- Category: Rally
- Country: Tasmania, Australia
- Inaugural event: 1992
- Official Website: www.targa.com.au

Targa Tasmania is a tarmac-based rally event held on the island state of Tasmania, Australia, annually since 1992. The event takes its name from the Targa Florio, a former motoring event held on the island of Sicily. The competition concept is drawn directly from the best features of the Mille Miglia, the Coupe des Alpes and the Tour de Corse.

== History ==
The inaugural event was held in April and May 1992 with a field of over 200 cars.

After three competitors died in 2021 and another in 2022, Motorsport Australia revoked the event's licence.

It is scheduled to resume in November 2025 with an amended course from Hobart to Launceston.

== Rally format ==
The rally started as a five-day event, but has been run as a six-day event for anniversaries in 2001, 2006 and 2016.

The layout of the 2016 event was:

- Leg 1 Launceston - George Town - Launceston
- Leg 2 Launceston - St Helens - Launceston
- Leg 3 Launceston - Sheffield - Launceston
- Leg 4 Launceston - Stanley - Strahan
- Leg 5 Strahan - New Norfolk - Hobart
- Leg 6 Hobart - Hobart

In 2008 the course was substantially revised, a number of well liked stages from previous years are now used (Riana), and a number of all new stages were introduced (Mount Claude and Rossarden). Leg 3 was dropped by shortening the Leg 2 East Coast day ending back in Launceston (rather than Hobart). Leg 3 is another loop north out of Launceston (running through Devonport on this day). Leg 4 later ran from Launceston through the lunch stop at Burnie to the evening end at Strahan. It was the longest tarmac rally in Australia with no repeated stages. Although a couple of stages will share the same piece of road in opposite directions on consecutive days.

The Targa is one of several Tarmac Rally events to be held in Australia. It also has had international connections with Targa New Zealand and Targa Newfoundland which have evolved since the inception of Targa Tasmania.

== List of past winners ==
In 2016 the premier category changed from Modern to Showroom GT2.

=== Showroom GT4 Competition ===
Showroom GT4 winners by year
Year	Driver	Navigator	Vehicle
2016	Steve Glenney	Tim Kulhanek	947 Subaru STI SPEC C
2017	Angus Kennard	Ian Wheeler	962 Nissan GT-R R35

=== Showroom GT2 Competition ===
Showroom GT2 winners by year
Year	Driver	Navigator	Vehicle
2016	Matt Close	Cameron Reeves	991 Porsche 911 GT3
2017	Jason White	John White	934 Dodge Viper ACR Extreme
2018	Jason White	John White	934 Dodge Viper ACR Extreme

=== Modern Competition ===
Modern competition winners by year
Year	Driver	Navigator	Vehicle
1992	Greg Crick	Greg Preece	Honda NSX
1993	Greg Crick	Greg Preece	Honda NSX
1994	Andrew Miedecke	Alan Taylor	Porsche 944 Turbo Cup
1995	Neal Bates	Coral Taylor	Toyota Celica GT-Four (ST205)
1996	Jim Richards	Barry Oliver	Porsche 911 (993)
1997	Jim Richards	Barry Oliver	Porsche 911 (993)
1998	Jim Richards	Barry Oliver	Porsche 911 (993)
1999	Peter Fitzgerald	Michael Mansour	Porsche 911 (993)
2000	Jim Richards	Barry Oliver	Porsche 911 GT3
2001	Jim Richards	Barry Oliver	Porsche 911 (996)
2002	Jim Richards	Barry Oliver	Porsche 911 (996)
2003	Jim Richards	Barry Oliver	Porsche 911 (996)
2004	Tony Sullens	Julia Rabbett	Subaru Impreza WRX STi S202
2005	Jason White	John White	Nissan Skyline GT-R
2006	Jim Richards	Barry Oliver	Porsche 911 GT2 CS (996)
2007	Tony Sullens	Julia Barkley	Subaru Impreza WRX Type RA (GC8)
2008	Steve Glenney	Bernie Webb	Mitsubishi Lancer Evolution IX RS
2009	Tony Quinn	Naomi Tillett	Nissan GT-R
2010	Jason White	John White	Lamborghini Gallardo Super Trofeo
2011	Tony Quinn	Naomi Tillett	Nissan GT-R
2012	Jason White	John White	Lamborghini Gallardo Super Trofeo
2013	Jason White	John White	Lamborghini Gallardo Super Trofeo
2014	Jamie Vandenberg	Dennis Sims	Nissan GT-R
2015	Jason White	John White	Lamborghini Gallardo Squadra Corse

=== Classic Competition ===
Classic Competition winners by year
Year	Driver	Navigator	Vehicle
1998	Peter Fitzgerald	Michael Petersen	Porsche 356
1999	Robert White	Angus Macleod	Sunbeam Tiger
2000	Jeremy Browne	Stella Plenderleith	Lancia Fulvia
2001	Paul Stuart	Mark Connolly	Porsche 911
2002	Rex Broadbent	Michael Goedheer	Porsche 911 RSR
2003	Graham Copeland	Jon Siddens	Datsun 1800SSS
2004	Nick Ellis	Tracy Williams	Ford Escort RS2000
2005	Michael Conway	Simon Gardiner	Ford Escort RS2000
2006	Ian Morris	Alex Molocznyk	1981 Alfa Romeo GTV6
2007	Rex Broadbent	Michael Goedheer	1974 Porsche 911 RS
2008	Rex Broadbent	Guy Lilleyman	1974 Porsche 911 RS
2009	Rex Broadbent	Michael Goedheer	1974 Porsche 911 RS
2010	Rex Broadbent	Chris Randell	1974 Porsche 911 RS
2011	Rex Broadbent	Chris Randell	1974 Porsche 911 RS
2012	Rex Broadbent	Chris Randell	1974 Porsche 911 RS
2013	Donn Todd	Dean Tighe	1971 Ford Capri Perana V8
2014	Barry Faux	Therezia Mhajlovic	1985 Mazda RX-7
2015	Craig Haysman	Mary Hughes	1981 Triumph TR7
2016	Leigh Achterberg	Greg Fitzgerald	1982 Porsche 944

== Trophies Awarded ==
A Targa Trophy is awarded to the driver and co-driver/navigator of each crew that completes all stages within the specified time for their class of vehicle. In subsequent years, the trophy may be upgraded as follows:

- Golden Targa Trophy - 3 consecutive regular trophies
- Platinum Targa Trophy - having achieved Gold then gaining another 3 consecutive regular trophies
- Diamond Targa Trophy - having achieved Platinum then gaining another 3 consecutive regular trophies
- Gold Diamond Targa Trophy - having achieved Diamond then gaining another 3 consecutive regular trophies
- Platinum Diamond Targa Trophy - having achieved Gold Diamond then gaining another 3 consecutive regular trophies

Once achieving Platinum Gold, the competitor is inducted into the Targa Hall of Fame Legends

2017 Trophy Classifications
Class	Competitors
Gold (3 successive regular)	Mary Hughes, Greg Fitzgerald, Suzanne Atkins, Steve Glenney, Scott Hunter, Trevor Macleod
Platinum (2 x gold)	Ian Wheeler, Peter Roberts, Angus Kennard, Neil Botha, Kim Burke, Damien Grimwood
Diamond (3 x gold)	Naomi Tillett, Kelly Handley, Peter Ullrich, Max Warwick
Gold Diamond (4 x gold)	Doug Fernie, Simon Davison, Amanda Davison, Lee Harper
Platinum Diamond 5 x gold)	Geoff Taylor, Stephen Thatcher

In 2019, Geoff Taylor (aged 73+) was the only competitor to have competed in all events.

In addition, each year the Denny Hulme Memorial Trophy is awarded to the competitor who exhibits tenacity to overcome adversity while completing the event. It was first awarded in 1993.

== Notable competitors ==
Notable past and current competitors have included Andrew Miedecke, Barry Sheene, Bob Wollek, Denny Hulme, Dick Johnson, Glenn Ridge, Greg Crick, Gregg Hansford, Jack Brabham, Jim Richards, Jochen Mass, Steven Richards, Jon and Gina Siddins, Mick Doohan, Murray Walker, Neal Bates, Peter Brock, Peter Fitzgerald, Roger Clark, Rex Broadbent, Rusty French, Sandro Munari, Stirling Moss, Alister McRae, Walter Röhrl and Eric Bana. The first person with a spinal cord injury to compete in the rally was Australian wheelchair rugby player Nazim Erdem.

== See also ==
- Australian Targa Championship
- List of events in Tasmania
- Love the Beast
