= Targa New Zealand =

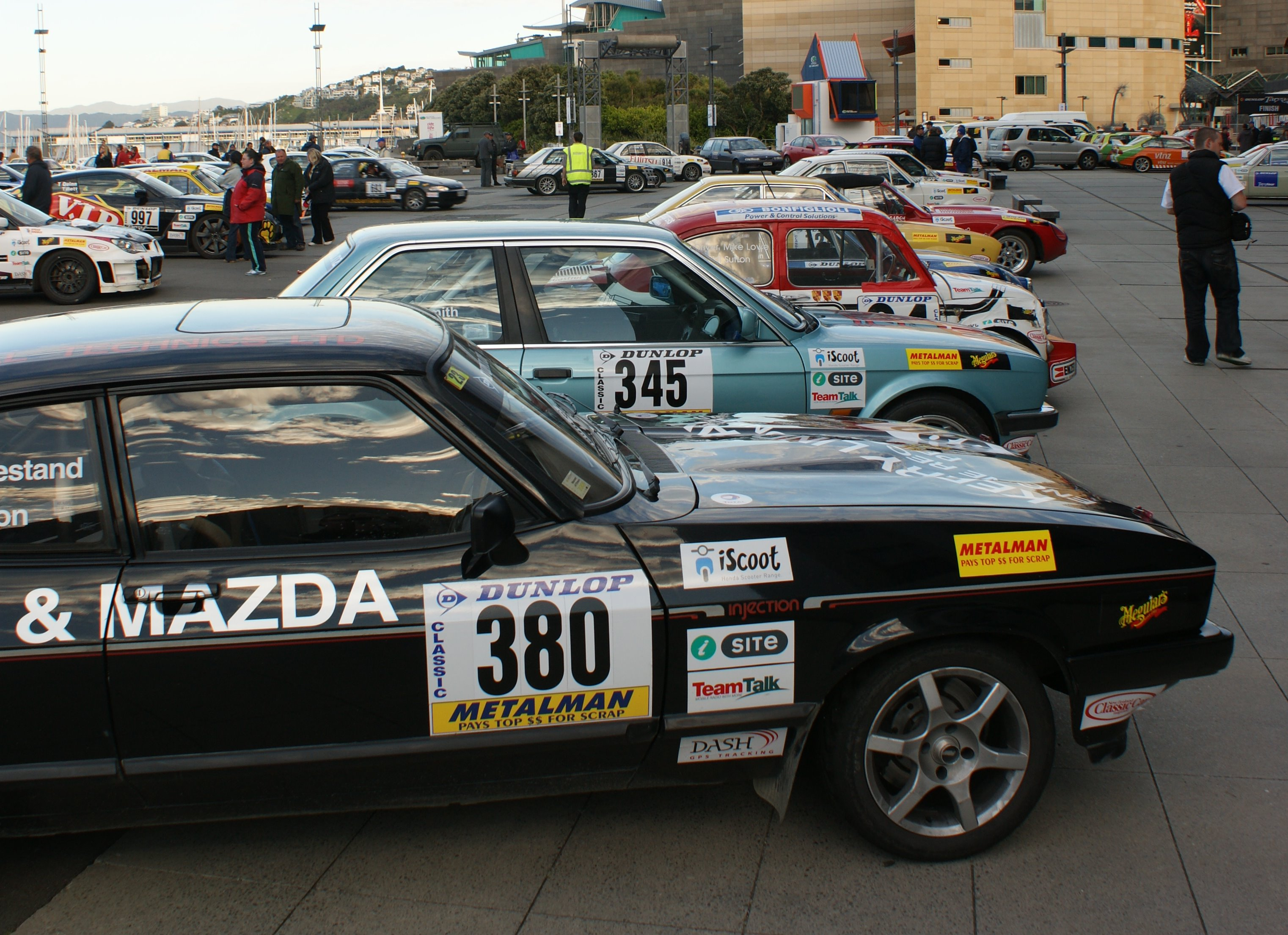
Targa race cars at the 2009 Targa New Zealand rally. The race series has been held annually since 1995.

The Targa New Zealand is a tarmac rally held annually on public roads typically throughout the North Island of New Zealand. The main Targa each year begins in the last week of October and is a week-long event which covers around 1500 km of touring and 750 km of closed special stages. Smaller one- or two-day events are usually run during the year and have been variously titled Targa Bambina, Targa Dash, Targa Rotorua, Targa Tauranga and Targa Hawkes Bay.

In 2014 Targa New Zealand for the first time was held in the South Island of New Zealand. Starting in Christchurch and finishing in Cromwell (Near Queenstown) the rally included every South Island race track including New Zealand's latest - Highlands Motorsport Park. Noticeable stages included Queenstown's Crown Range which is understood to be one of New Zealand's highest altitude public roads.

Originally intended as an event for owners of classic performance cars to display and race their vehicles, it has evolved into a serious competition event with modern purpose built race cars usually taking top honours.

The race started in 1995 and continually growing in popularity with over 200 cars entering the 2005 Dunlop sponsored Targa rally.

Racing is divided into classes to give everyone a chance of honours of some sort. These classes are based around age and engine size of the vehicles. Younger drivers are encouraged to compete in a controlled manner in a safe environment. Crashes happen but it is a very low percentage. Race cars need to have roll cages and safety gear except the Targa tour for first-time competitors. They drive under the guidance of the tour leader. Local groups providing hospitality areas, fundraising activities such as car washes, barbecues and 4000 lunches.

Classes for Early Targa Events

- Historic
- Pre-classic
- Classic
- Post classic
- Metalman super classics
- Metalman all-comers
- Early modern
- Honda riders contemporary
- Super GT

Classes for Current Targa Events

Classic 2WD

- Category 1 0 – 2000cc Aftermarket sequential gearboxes are prohibited
- Category 2 2001 – 3400cc Aftermarket sequential gearboxes are prohibited
- Category 3 3401cc and over Aftermarket sequential gearboxes are prohibited

Production (GT2) 2WD

- Category 4 0 – 2000cc Aftermarket sequential gearboxes are prohibited
- Category 5 2001 – 3400cc Aftermarket sequential gearboxes are prohibited
- Category 6 3401cc and over Aftermarket sequential gearboxes are prohibited

Production (GT4) 4WD

- Category 8 Pre 2000 1st year of production prior to 1 January 2000. Aftermarket sequential gearboxes are prohibited
- Category 9 Post 2000 1st year of production after to 1 January 2000. Aftermarket sequential gearboxes are prohibited

Allcomers (Extreme) 2WD and 4WD

- Category 7 Open 2WD All 2 wheel drive vehicles not eligible for Categories 1–6.
- Category 10 Open 4WD All 4 wheel drive vehicles not eligible for Categories 8-9.

== Past winners ==
Year	Driver	Co-driver	Car
1995	Greg Graham, Team Subaru NZ	Jeff Judd	WRX Subaru
1996	Greg Graham, Team Subaru NZ	Colin Smith	WRX Subaru
1997	Geoff Ray,	Shayne O'Hagen	Mitsubishi Evo
1998	Geoff Ray,	Shayne O'Hagen	Mitsubishi Evo
1999	Chris Ramsay,	Laurie Brenssell	Mitsubishi Evo
2000	Greg Kirkham,	Mal Clark	Mitsubishi Mirage
2001	Craig Dean,	Shane Beaumont	Ford Mustang
2002	Anton Tallott	Anne Tallott	Mazda RX-7
2003	Tony Quinn	Keith Wenn	Porsche 996 Turbo
2004	Jim Richards	Barry Oliver	Porsche GT3
2005	Jim Richards	Barry Oliver	Porsche GT3
2006	Joe McAndrew	Sue O'Neil	Nissan Skyline GT-R R34
2007	Joe McAndrew	Sue O'Neil	Nissan Skyline GT-R R34
2008	Richard Mason	Sara Mason	Subaru Impreza STI
2009	Tony Quinn	Naomi Tillett	Nissan GT-R R35
2010	Tony Quinn	Naomi Tillett	Nissan GT-R R35
2011	Tony Quinn	Naomi Tillett	Nissan GT-R R35
2012	Tony Quinn	Naomi Tillett	Nissan GT-R R35
2013	Martin Dippie	Jona Grant	Porsche GT3 RS
2014	Glenn Inkster	Spencer Winn	Mitsubishi Evo 9
2015	Glenn Inkster	Spencer Winn	Mitsubishi Evo 9
2016	Glenn Inkster	Spencer Winn	Mitsubishi Evo 9
2017	Glenn Inkster	Spencer Winn	Mitsubishi Evo 8
2018	Glenn Inkster	Spencer Winn	Mitsubishi Evo 8
2019	Haydn Mackenzie	Matthew Sayers	MitsubishiLancer EVO X RS
2020	-	-	-
2021	-	-	-
2022	Cameron Ross	Matthew Buer	Subaru Impreza

== Multiple Winners ==
=== Driver ===
Wins	Driver	Years
5	(United Kingdom) Tony Quinn	(2003, 2009, 2010, 2011, 2012)
5	(New Zealand) Glenn Inkster	(2014, 2015, 2016, 2017, 2018)
2	(New Zealand) Greg Graham	(1995, 1996)
2	(New Zealand) Geoff Ray	(1997, 1998)
2	(New Zealand) Jim Richards	(2004, 2005)
2	(New Zealand) Joe McAndrew	(2006, 2007)

=== Co-Driver ===
Wins	Co-Driver	Years

=== Manufacturer ===
Wins	Manufacturer	Years
10	Mitsubishi	(1997-2000, 2014-2019)
6	Nissan	(2006-2007, 2009-2012)
4	Porsche	(2003-2005, 2013)
4	Subaru	(1995-1996, 2008, 2022)

== Well known Targa entrants ==
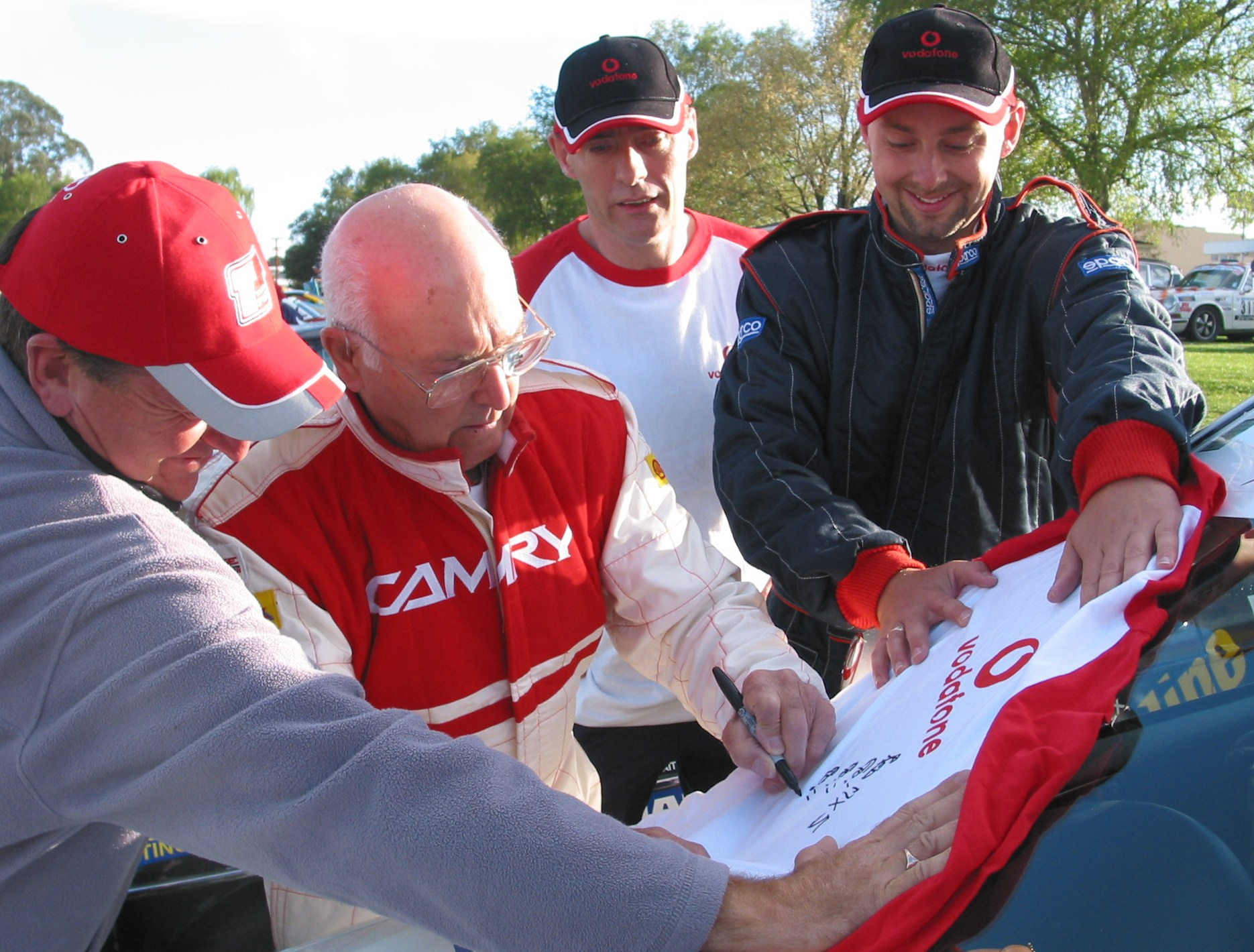
Murray Walker, Racing in Targa New Zealand. Also in picture Adam Spence on right.

- Jim Richards
- Tony Quinn
- Chris Amon
- Murray Walker
- Peter Brock
- Grant Dalton
- Steve Millen
