= Chevrolet Corvette (C4) =

Fourth generation of the Corvette sports car

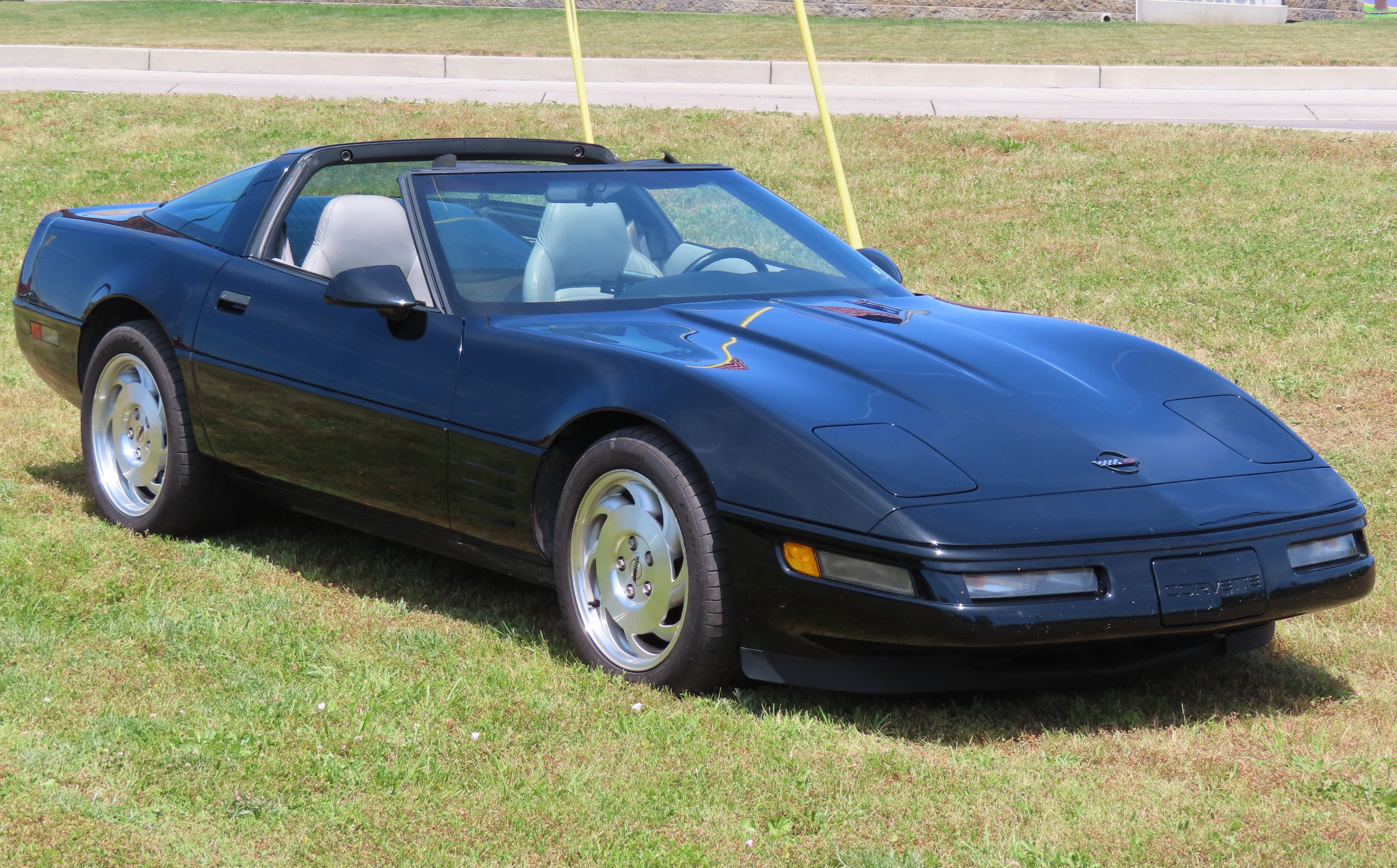
- 1994 Chevrolet Corvette

Overview
- Manufacturer: Chevrolet (General Motors)
- Production: January 3, 1983 – June 20, 1996
- Model years: 1984–1996
- Assembly: United States: Bowling Green, Kentucky
- Designer: Jerry Palmer under Dave McLellan (1980) and Irv Rybicki

Body and chassis
- Class: Sports car (S)
- Body style: 2-door targa top; 2-door convertible
- Layout: Front mid-engine, rear-wheel-drive
- Platform: Y-body
- Related: Callaway Sledgehammer Corvette; Callaway Speedster; Callaway SuperNatural 450 Grand Sport; Callaway SuperNatural Corvette; Callaway Twin Turbo Corvette

Powertrain
- Engine: 350 cu in (5.7 L) L83 V8; 350 cu in (5.7 L) L98 V8; 350 cu in (5.7 L) LT1 V8; 350 cu in (5.7 L) LT4 V8; 350 cu in (5.7 L) LT5 V8
- Transmission: 4-speed 700R4 automatic; 4+3-speed Doug Nash (overdrive) manual (1984–1988 only); 4-speed Hydramatic 4L60-E automatic (1994–1996 only); 6-speed ZF manual

Dimensions
- Wheelbase: 96.2 in (2,440 mm)
- Length: 176.5 in (4,480 mm) (1984–1989)
- Width: 71.0 in (1,800 mm) (1984–1992)
- Height: Coupe: 46.7 in (1,190 mm) (1984–1992); Convertible: 46.4 in (1,180 mm) (1984–1992)
- Curb weight: 3,239 lb (1,469 kg)

Chronology
- Predecessor: Chevrolet Corvette (C3)
- Successor: Chevrolet Corvette (C5)

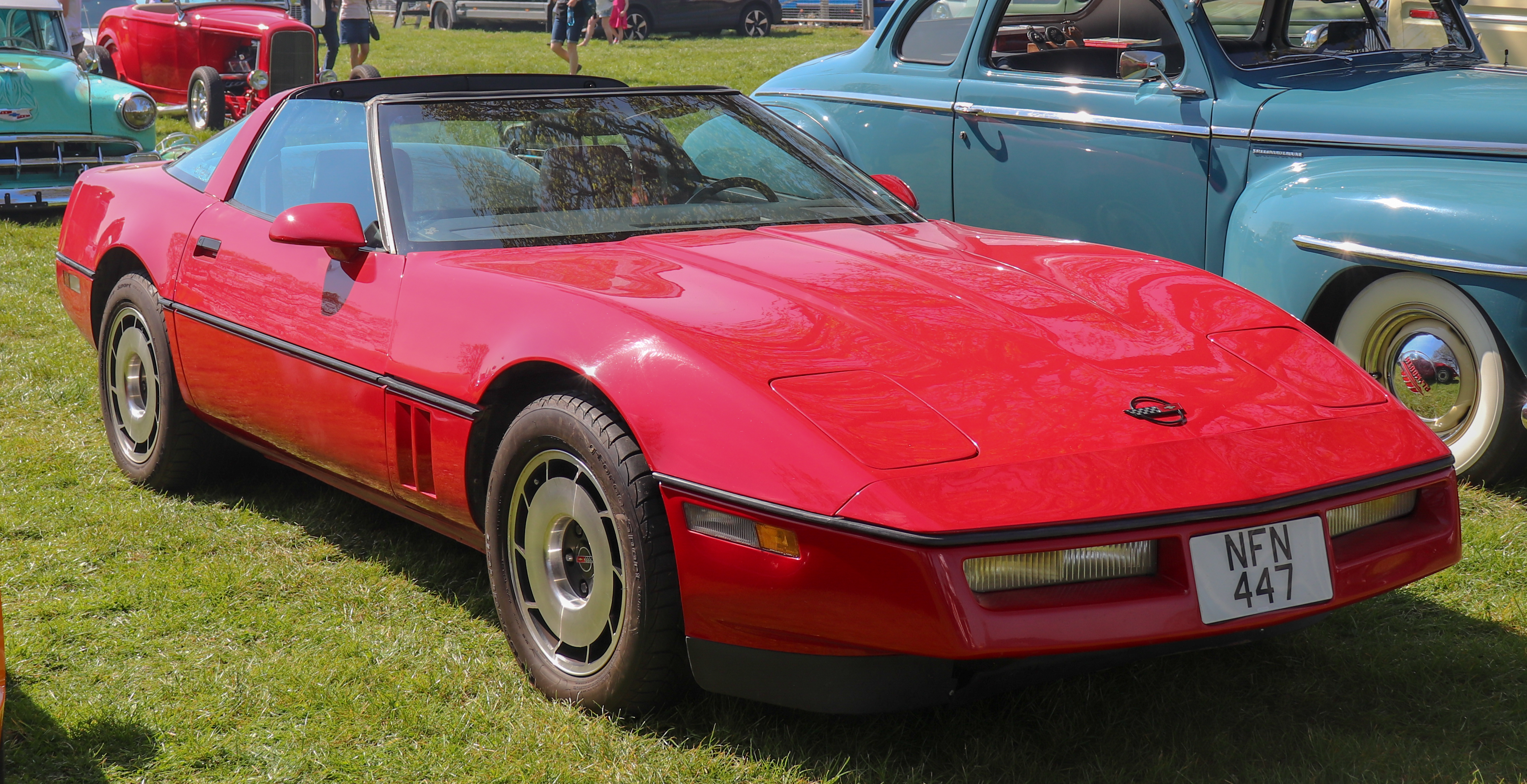
1984 C4 Corvette

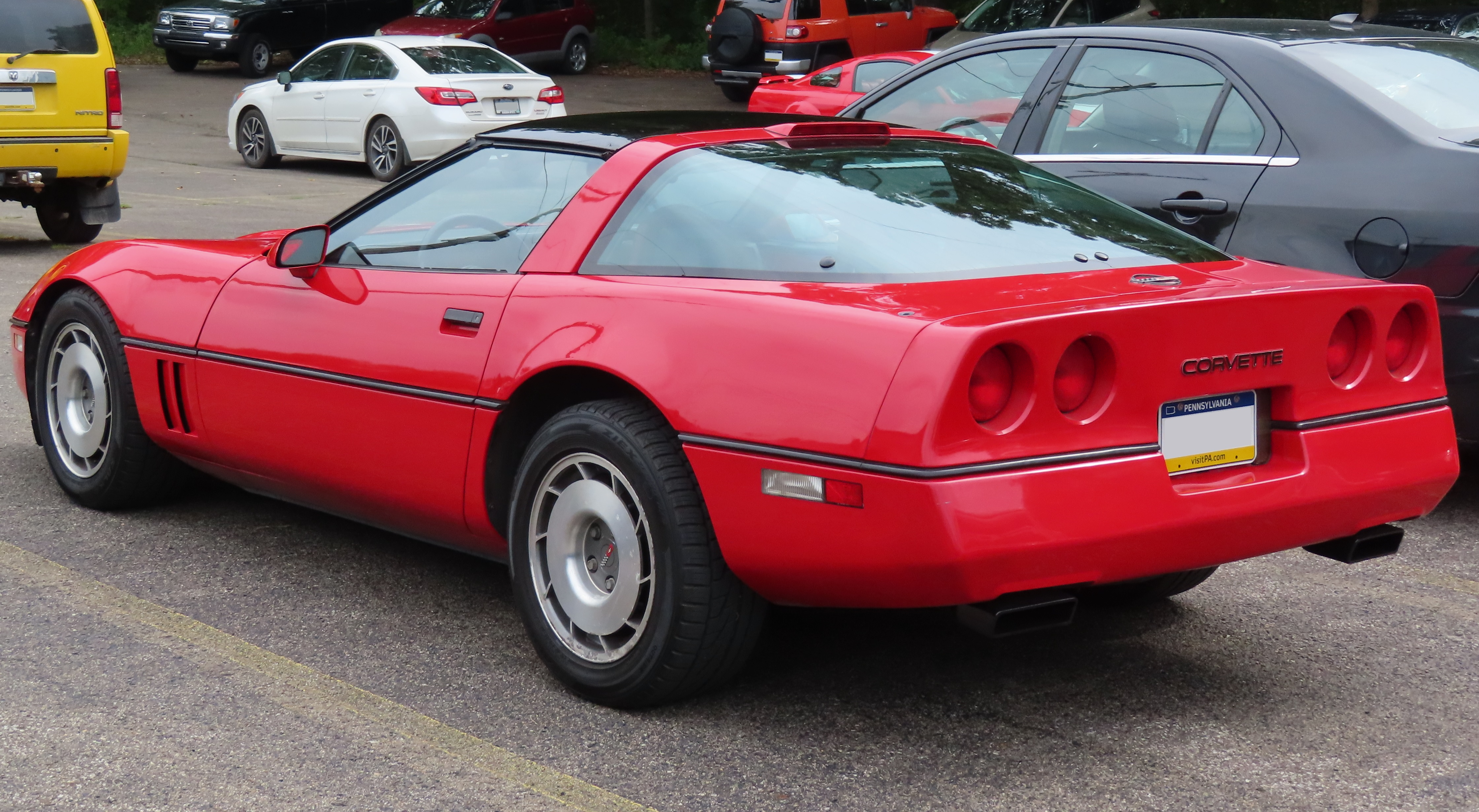
1987 C4 Corvette rear

The Chevrolet Corvette (C4) is the fourth generation of the Corvette sports car, manufactured and marketed by the Chevrolet division of General Motors for 1984–1996 model years. While no 1983 Corvettes were sold to the public, GM built 43 pre-production pilot cars for engineering and testing. All but one of these test vehicles were ordered to be destroyed. One white pre-production 1983 Corvette—VIN 1G1AY0783D5100023—escaped the crusher. It was hidden away, temporarily parked outside the factory, and largely forgotten for years. After being rediscovered and restored, it was spared and remains the only true 1983 Corvette in existence. It miraculously survived a massive sinkhole at the museum in 2014 and is permanently on display at the National Corvette Museum in Bowling Green, Kentucky. In 1986 The convertible returned, as did higher performance engines, exemplified by the 375 hp (280 kW) LT5 found in the ZR1. In early March 1990, the ZR1 would set new records for the highest average speed over 24 hours at over 175 mph (282 km/h) and highest average speed over 5,000 miles at over 173 mph (278 km/h). With a completely new chassis and styling, and other improvements to the model, prices rose and sales declined. The last C4 was produced on June 20, 1996.

== Overview ==
The C4 Corvette represented a clean break from the Zora Arkus-Duntov-designed C3, with a completely new chassis and sleeker, more modern but still evolutionary styling. It was the work of a team under chief Corvette designer Dave McLellan, who'd taken over from Duntov in 1975 — under the design direction of Irv Rybicki.

In a departure from the fiberglass panels of its forebears, the C4's rear bumpers and panels used a sheet molding compound. The C4 fastback coupe was the first general production Corvette to have a glass hatchback (the limited edition 1982 Collector Edition being the first Corvette equipped with this feature) for better storage access. The roof panel, which was made from fiberglass or optionally from clear acrylic, was removable. The Corvette C4 came standard with an electronic dashboard with a digital liquid crystal display instrument cluster. It displayed a combination of graphics for speed and RPM, fuel level, and used digital displays for other important engine functions. For the first time since 1957, the Corvette used single headlights instead of dual units, but they were still retractable.

Since emissions regulations were still changing and electronic engine management was in its infancy, engine power output was low compared to earlier generations. The primary design emphasis at launch was therefore focused on handling and braking, with an all-independent light-weight suspension and wheels and all new brakes with aluminum calipers. The front suspension saw the C3's coil springs replaced by a transverse fiberglass mono-leaf spring, which was only 1/3 of the weight of the coil springs while also introducing an anti-roll bar-like effect on the front. The price of the emphasis on handling was ride comfort, especially with the Z51 performance and handling package. Spring rates were sequentially softened for the 1985 model year. The C4 did not use separate body-on-frame construction like its predecessors. Instead, it used what GM termed a "uniframe", which consisted of a traditional perimeter frame, with the door posts, windshield frame, halo U-shaped frame overhead behind the seats and the rear portion of the floor pan integrated into one welded assembly. This was not a unibody assembly, as none of the exterior body panels were structural members. Due to a styling decision to use a targa top instead of T-tops, there was no structural member tying the windshield frame to the halo as on the C3. This required extremely tall side rails on the frame to maintain chassis rigidity, and as a result, the door sills were quite deep, with entry and exit likened by contemporary auto journals to a "fall in and climb out" experience. The targa top bolted into place, becoming a structural component, rather than simply latching on like T-tops. The parking brake, located between the door sill and the drivers seat, was moved lower and toward the rear of the car in 1987 for easier entry and exit.

Only a total of 43 prototype and pre-production Corvettes were manufactured with a 1983 Vehicle Identification Number (VIN). None were made available to the public as official production vehicles. All were destroyed except one, VIN 1G1AY0783D5100023 (white with a medium blue interior), fitted with a 350 cu in (5.7 L) L83 205 hp (153 kW) V8 engine and a 4-speed automatic transmission. It was displayed above the factory entrance for years until it was restored and is now displayed in the National Corvette Museum in Bowling Green, Kentucky. The 1983 model delay was due to problems with parts supplier quality issues and production line changeover issues. GM decided to cancel the 1983 model year production and started the 1984 model year Corvettes early. Regular 1984 model year production began on January 3, 1983, and delivery to customers began in March 1983. The 1984 models were produced for 17 months.

From the 1984 model year (available January 1984) through the 1988 model year, the Corvette was available with a Doug Nash "4+3" transmission – a 4-speed manual coupled to an automatic overdrive on the top three gears. While controversial, this unusual transmission offered a synergy that allowed the Corvette to keep a stout 4 speed, but add an overdrive. As technology progressed, it was replaced by a modern ZF 6-speed manual transmission. However, the C4's performance was hampered by its L98 250 hp (186 kW) engine until 1992, when the second-generation Chevy small block, the 300 hp (224 kW) LT1, was introduced, markedly improving the C4's performance. 1996 was a high point of small block engines development and the 330 hp (246 kW) LT4 was introduced in all six-speed manual transmission equipped cars. The LT4 produced maximum power output at 5,800 rpm and 340 lb⋅ft (461 N⋅m) of torque at 4,500 rpm. While the LT4 was available in any Corvette, it was highlighted in the 1996 Grand Sport package.

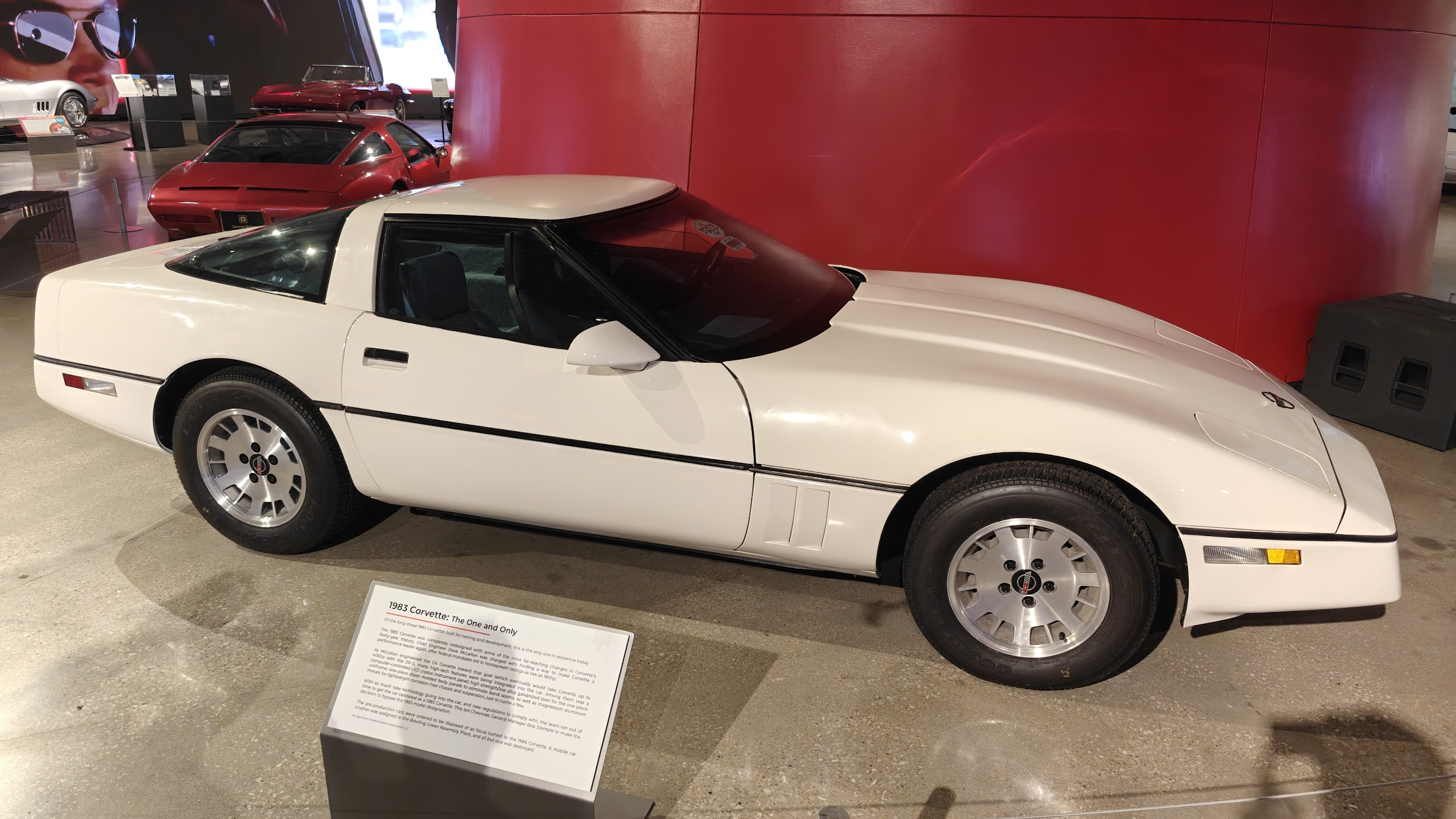
The last 1983 C4 prototype

The 1986 Corvette saw the return of the convertible and was named as the Pace Car for the Indianapolis 500. 1986 also saw the introduction of the Pass Key I passive anti-theft system, wherein each key contained a special pellet that could be detected and identified by the car's computer system by detecting electrical resistance. Being early in the rollout of this new technology, there were only 15 different resistance values available. Once thieves discovered this weakness, it markedly reduced the value of this early system.

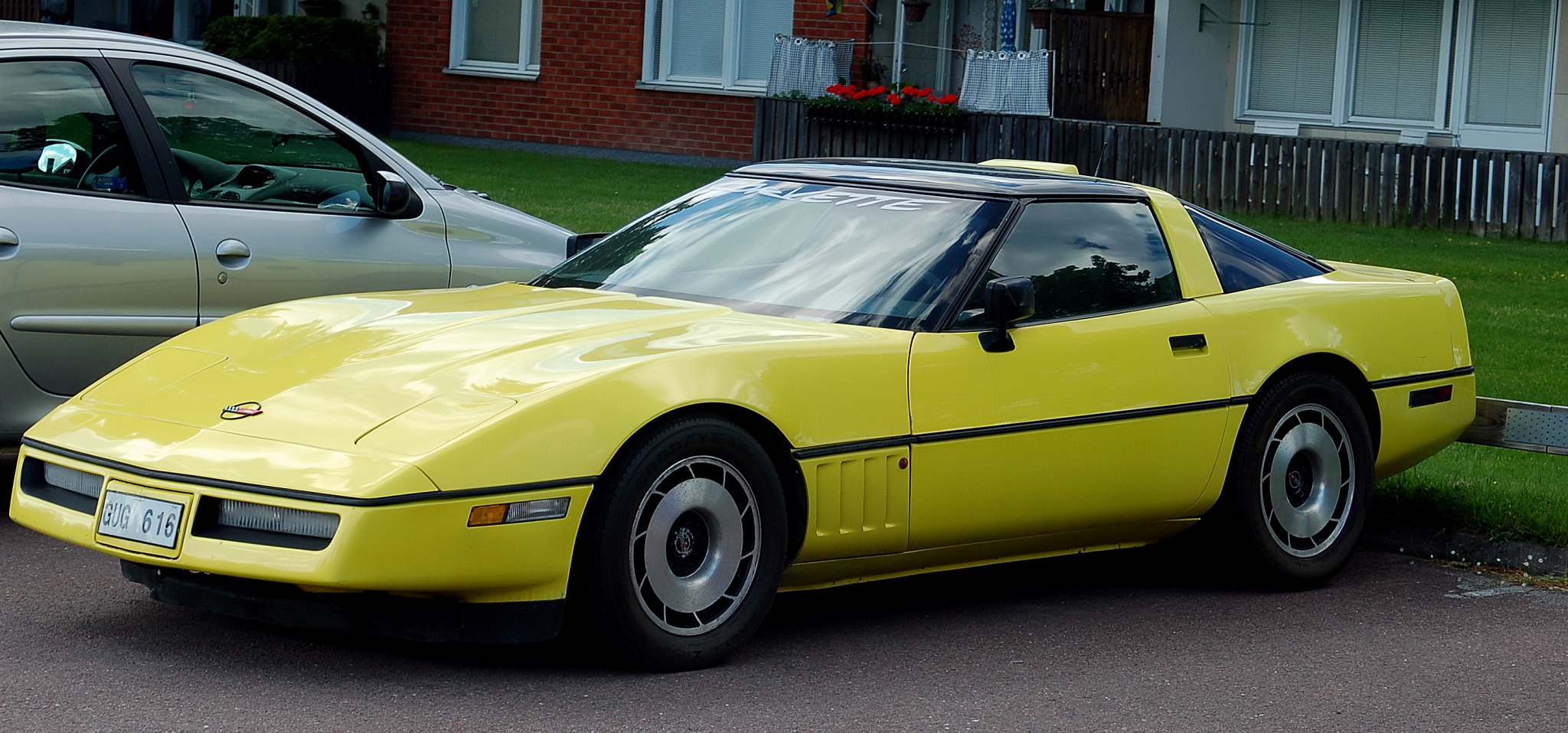
Targa top with roof panel

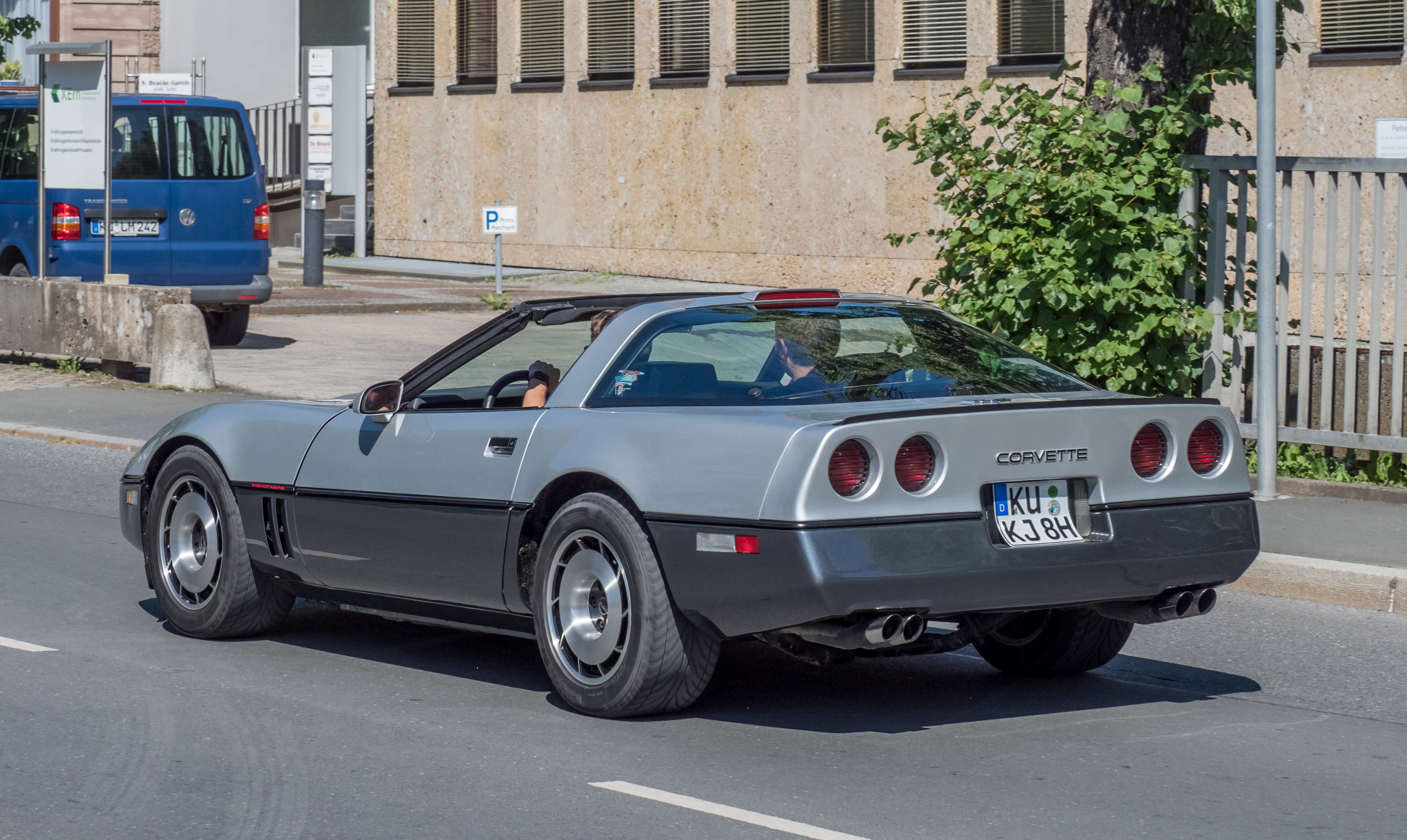
Targa top without roof panel

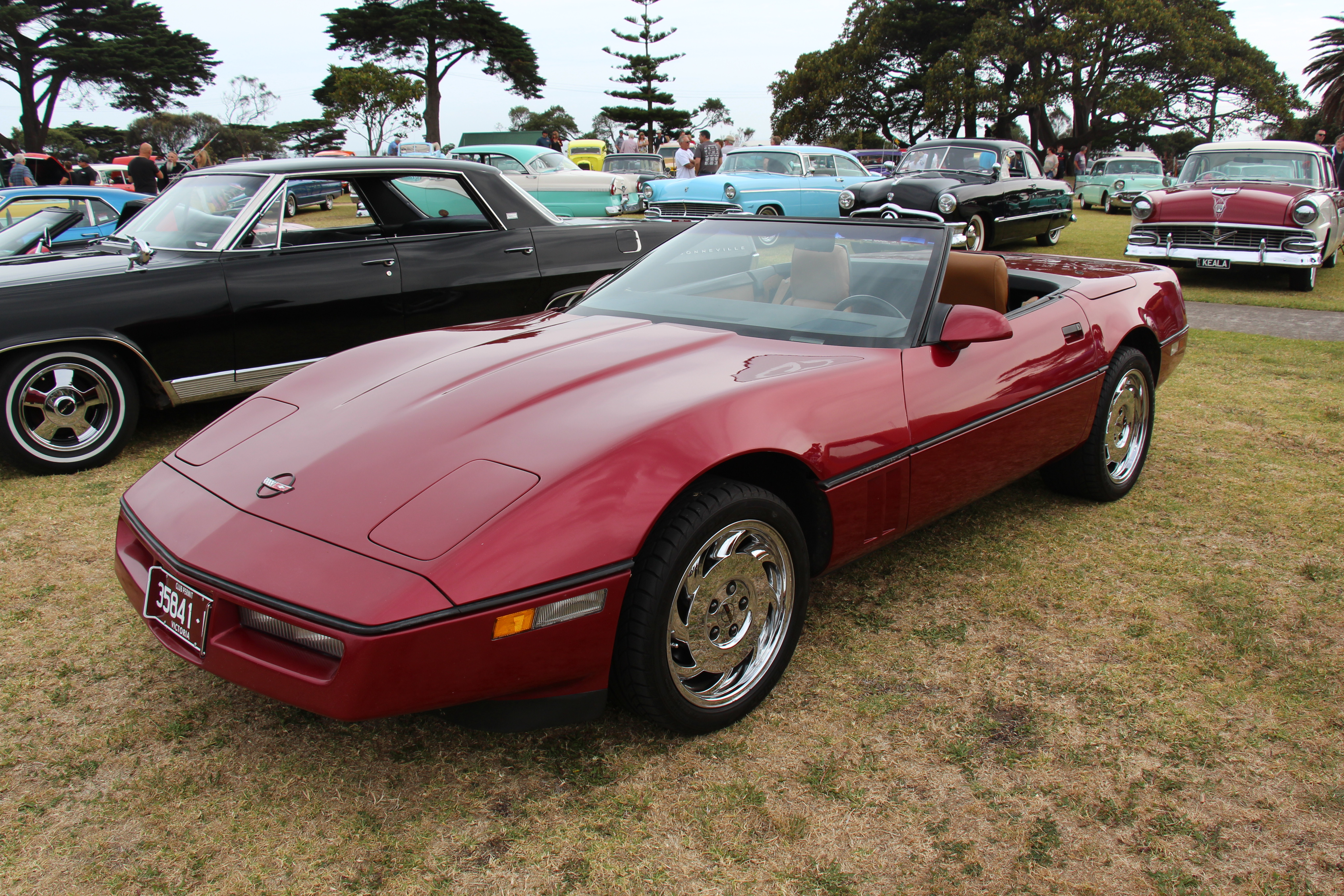
Convertible

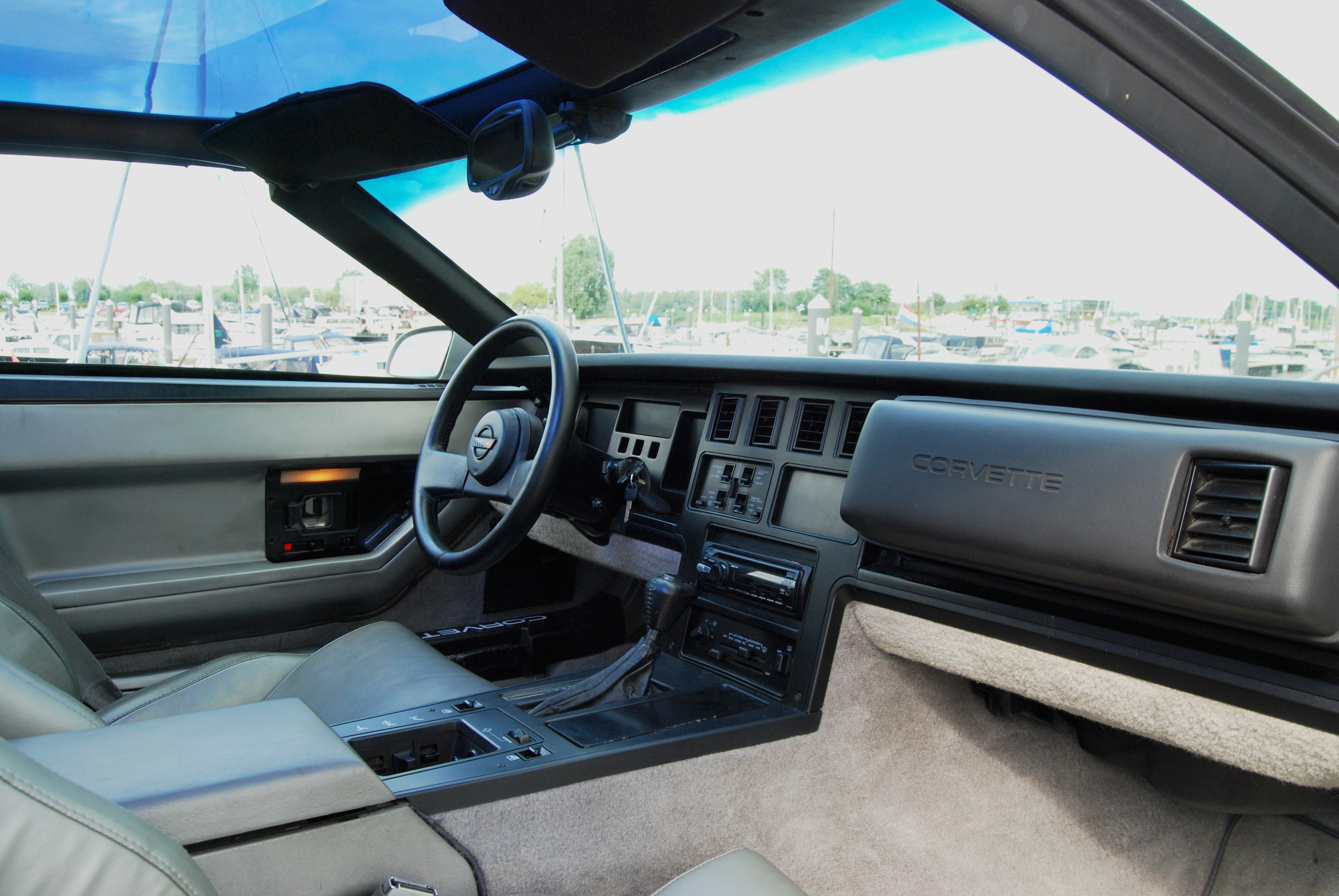
The interior and dashboard of a 1986 Corvette C4 Coupe with grey upholstery

== ZR1 (1990–1995) ==
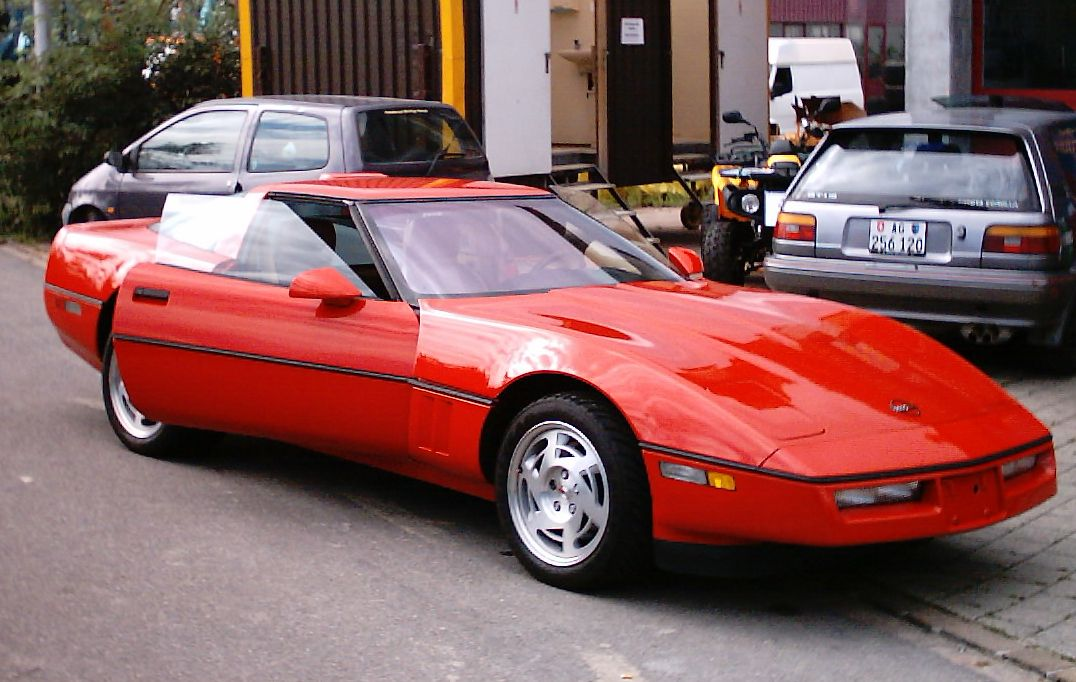
Corvette ZR1

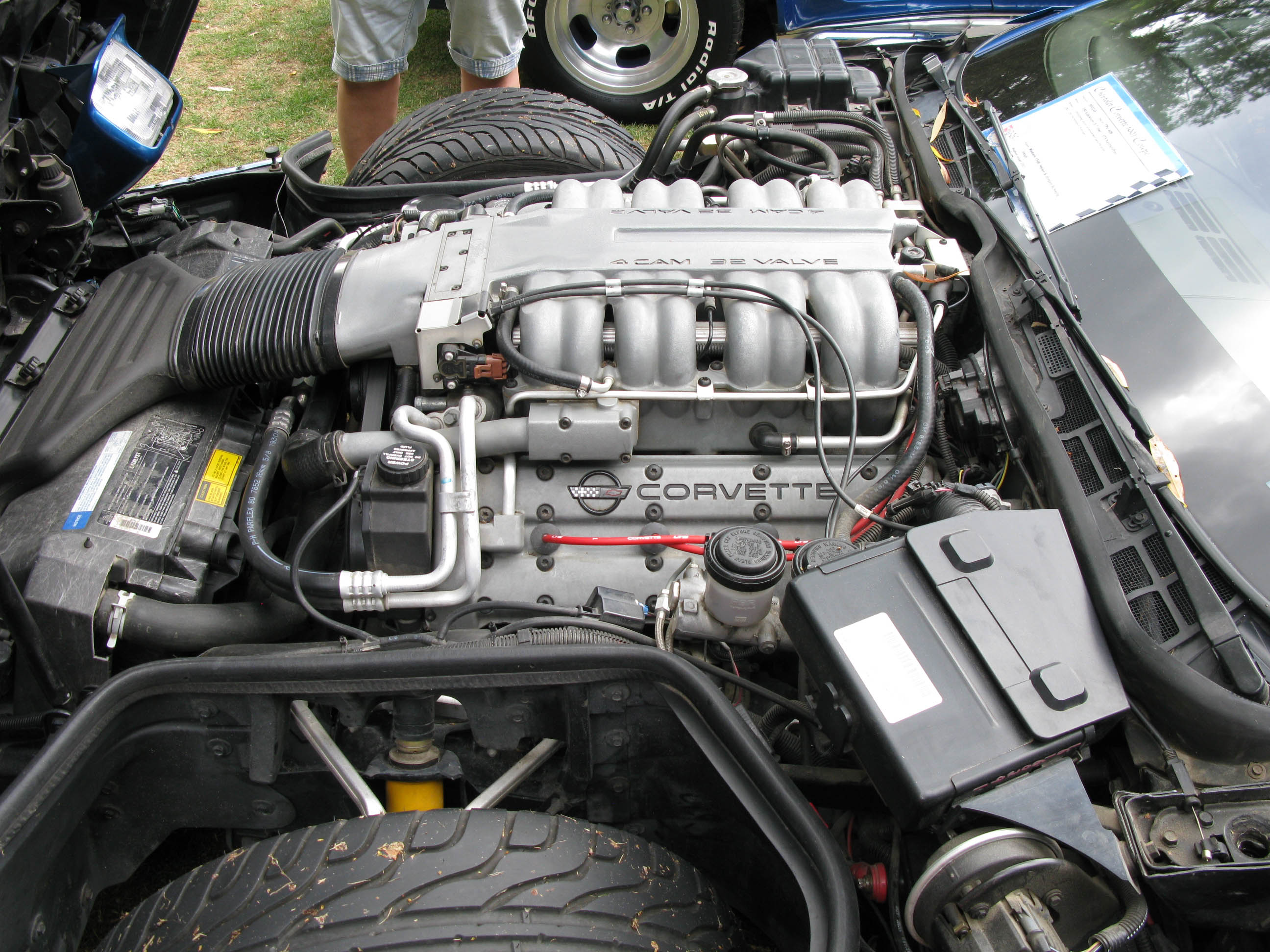
5.7 L (350 cu in) LT5 V8 in a C4 ZR1

General Motors acquired Group Lotus, a UK based engineering consultant and performance car manufacturing firm, during 1986. The Corvette division approached Lotus with the idea of developing the world's fastest production car, to be based on the C4 generation of the Corvette. With input from GM, Lotus designed a new engine to fit in place of the L98 V8 that was powering the standard C4. The result was what GM dubbed the LT5, an aluminum-block V8 with the same bore centers as the L98, but with four overhead camshafts and 32 valves. Lotus also designed a unique air management system for the engine to provide a wider power band by shutting off 8 of the 16 intake runners and fuel injectors when the engine was at part-throttle, while still giving the ZR1 a power output of 375 hp (280 kW) when at wide open throttle.

In addition to the engine, Lotus helped GM design the ZR1's (which in prototype version was called "King of the Hill") upgraded braking and steering systems. The ZR1 is fitted with Goodyear Eagle Gatorback tires having size of P315/ 35ZR-17 specially made for the car along with bigger ventilated disc brakes. Due to the heavier engine and body work along with wide tires, the ZR1 is 200 lb (91 kg) heavier than the standard C4 Corvette. The ZR1 came standard with the UJ6 Low-Tire-Pressure Warning System along with an ABS system manufactured by Bosch. The FX3 suspension system was engineered by Bilstein and was similar to the system used in the Porsche 959 albeit with modifications from the Lotus Formula 1 division. The system used a gas-over-oil shock absorber whose hollow center shaft came fitted with an adjustable orifice which controls the flow of oil in the shock absorber. The system allowed for six damping settings in each of the three driving modes namely Touring, Sport, and Performance and had 14 total steps. Servomotors coupled with a microprocessor governed the vehicle's speed and adjusted the suspension system accordingly.

The 5.7-liter DOHC 32-valve LT5 engine unique to the car had a central bore spacing of 4.40 inches. The distance was maintained by reducing the bore from 4.00 to 3.90 inches while the stroke was increased from 3.48 to 3.66 inches. The aluminum cylinder liners were Nikasil-coated and the engine block has a cast-aluminum oil sump. The crankcase has integral four- and six-bolt cast-iron main bearing caps which secure the forged steel crankshaft into place. The four camshafts of the engine are driven by a roller chain and actuate hydraulic lifters that eliminate valve lash adjustment. The four-valve combustion chambers feature centrally located spark plugs which act in combination with dished aluminum pistons enabling for a compression ratio of 11.0:1. The engine held 12 quarts of oil, 7 more than the L98 engine. The LT5 also came with a unique two valve induction system along with 16 tuned-length intake runners and a specially designed intake manifold using three throttle bodies. The small primary throttle body was for responsive low speed operation while the two large secondary throttle bodies enabled for full-power usage. The engine used direct-fire ignition: Four coils ignite two spark plugs simultaneously, upon receiving their cue from a crankshaft sensor acting in combination with the ECM. Spark advance and retardation are electronically controlled by the ECM, which gets an additional information from a knock sensor. A distinctive cooling system incorporating a 15% larger radiator ensured that the operating temperature of the engine remained the same as the L98 despite the differences in construction and operation.

In order to transfer power efficiently to the rear wheels, a unique 6-speed manual transmission manufactured by ZF was installed with a code name of ML9. The transmission used Computer Aided Gear Selection (CAGS) which forced the driver to shift from first to fourth under low power urban driving conditions. The rear differential had a final drive ratio of 3.45:1.

Other exterior modifications include a hard coated acrylic roof panel, and seven additional exterior colors. The interior came standard with leather sports seats and a Delco/Bose sound system.

Tested performance figures by Road & Track magazine include a 0–60 mph (0–97 km/h) acceleration time of 4.9 seconds, a quarter mile time of 13.4 seconds, braking distance of 132 ft from 60 mph and 233 ft from 80 mph along with skidpad acceleration of 0.94 g. The car's tested top speed by the magazine amounted to 179 mph (288 km/h). Car and Driver magazine achieved a 0–60 mph (0–97 km/h) time of 4.5 seconds, a quarter mile time of 12.8 seconds at 111 mph (179 km/h) and skidpad (300 ft) acceleration of 0.89 g.

GM found that the engine required special assembly, and that neither the Corvette plant in Bowling Green, Kentucky, nor any of their normal production facilities could handle the workload, so Mercury Marine corporation of Stillwater, Oklahoma, was contracted to assemble the engines under their MerCruiser division, due to their experience in working with aluminum, and ship them to the Corvette factory in Bowling Green where the ZR1s were being assembled. The engine assembly involved 95% drilling and boring completed at the Mercury Marine plant. The engine was largely assembled by hand and was tested on an engine stand before being sent to Chevrolet. Mercury Marine secured two LT5 V8 engines for itself. These engines were used in the ZR1 owned by the company president and a custom made speedboat called the "Wette Vette". The engine was modified to be used in the boat and had an increased output of 420 hp (313 kW).

The ZR1 was introduced at the 1989 Geneva Motor Show and went on sale later that year and was available only as a fastback coupe bodystyle with a removable roof panel. It was distinguishable from other Corvette coupes by its wider tail section, 11-inch wide rear wheels and its new convex rear fascia with four square shaped taillights along with a special red ZR1 badge in between.

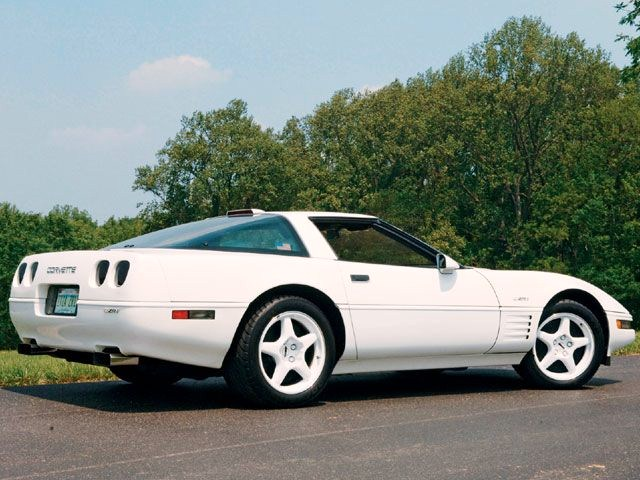
1992 Corvette ZR1

In 1990, the 1991 ZR1 and 1991 base model received updates to bodywork, interior, and wheels. The rear convex fascia and square taillights that set the 1990 ZR1 apart from the base model found their way to all 1991 models, making the high-priced ZR1 less distinguishable; however the ZR1's center high mount stop lamp remained above the rear window while those on base Corvettes were integrated into the rear fascia. Further changes were made the following year in 1991, including extra ZR1 badges on the fenders and the introduction of Acceleration Slip Regulation (ASR) or traction control. For model year 1993, modifications which were designed by Lotus were made to the cylinder heads, exhaust system and valvetrain of the LT5 bringing power output up from 375 to 405 hp (280 to 302 kW) at 5,800 rpm and 385 lb⋅ft (522 N⋅m) of torque at 5,200 rpm. In addition, a new exhaust gas recirculation system improved emissions control. The model remained nearly unchanged into the 1995 model year, after which the ZR1 was discontinued as the result of waning interest, development of the LS series engines, manufacturing cost and the forthcoming introduction of the C5 generation. A total of 6,939 ZR1 models were manufactured over the six-year period. Not until the debut of the C5 based Z06 in 2001 would Chevrolet have another production Corvette capable of matching the ZR1's performance.

A stock ZR1 set seven international and world records at a test track in Fort Stockton, Texas, on March 1, 1990, verified by the FIA (Fédération Internationale de l'Automobile) for the group II, class 11 category:

- 100 miles (160 km) at 175.600 mph (282.601 km/h)
- 500 miles (800 km) at 175.503 mph (282.445 km/h)
- 1,000 miles (1,600 km) at 174.428 mph (280.715 km/h)
- 5,000 km (3,100 mi) at 175.710 mph (282.778 km/h) (World Record)
- 5,000 miles (8,000 km) at 173.791 mph (279.690 km/h) (World Record)
- 12 Hours Endurance at 175.523 mph (282.477 km/h)
- 24 Hours Endurance at 175.885 mph (283.059 km/h) for 4,221.256 miles (6,793.453 km) (World Record)

These records were later broken by the Volkswagen W12, a concept car.

=== ZR1 Active Suspension prototype (1990) ===
The Active Suspension prototype was based on the ZR1, but it includes active hydraulic suspension found in the GTP Corvette race car. It was developed as a prototype for a limited edition run in the 1990 model year.

Twenty-five active suspension vehicles were built at the Bowling Green Plant.

A prototype was sold in 2009 at the Barrett-Jackson Palm Beach auction for $60,000 (~$87,385 in 2025) (before buyer premium).

== B2K Callaway Twin-Turbo ==
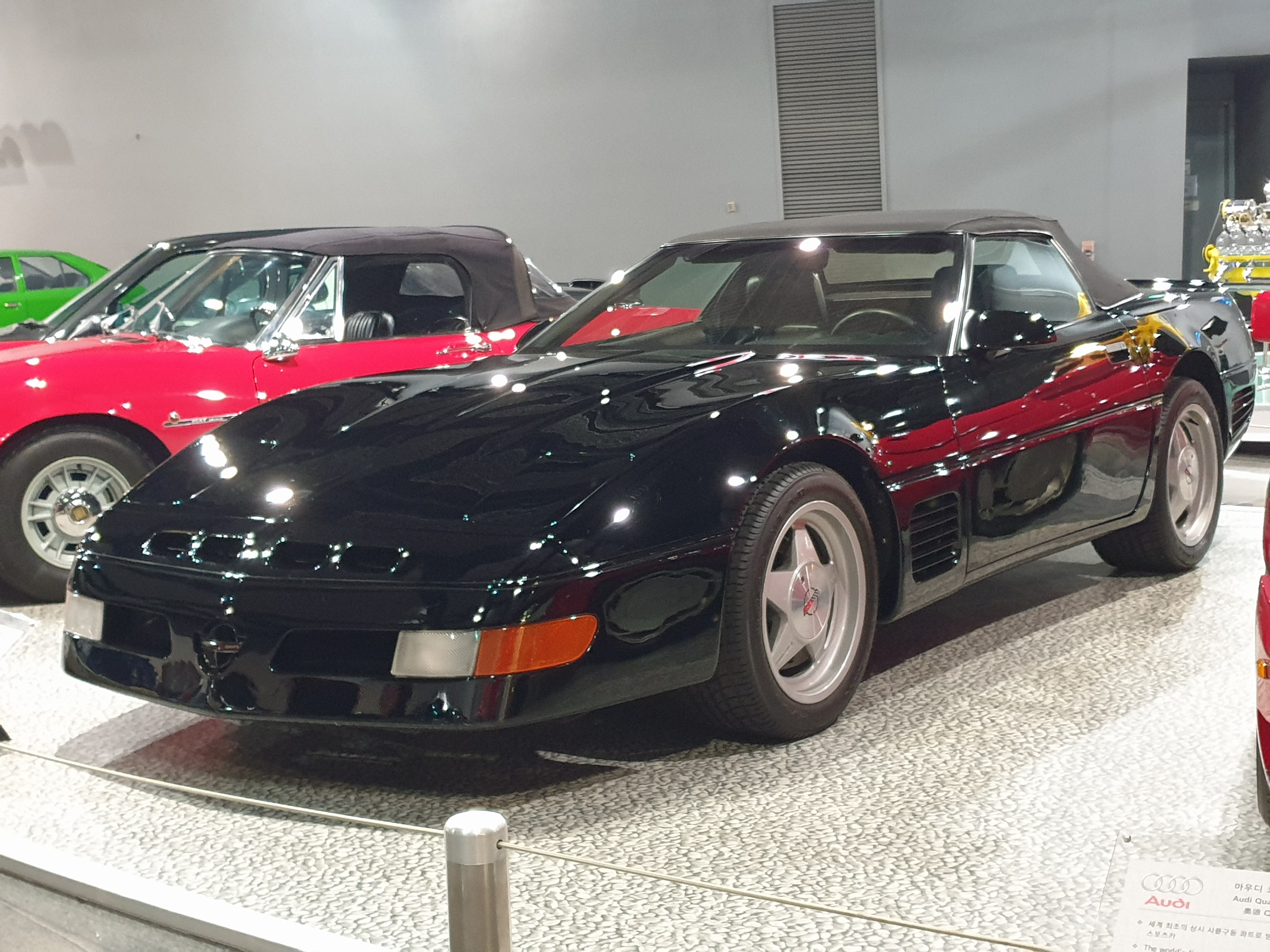
1990 Chevrolet Callaway Corvette Convertible

The B2K was a high-performance alternative to the standard Corvette offered by Callaway Cars under license from Chevrolet from 1987 to 1991. It was available at Chevrolet dealers if the customer selected the "RPO B2K" option on the order specification sheet. Chevrolet approached Callaway to offer such an option after seeing the power output the tuning company was able to extract reliably from modified twin-turbocharged Alfa Romeo V6 engines. The car came with normal Chevrolet warranty as well as an additional one year 12,000-mile warranty from Callaway Cars. The conversion cost an extra US$26,995 over the price of a base model Corvette. The conversion consisted of taking the engine out of the car and performing a thorough set of modifications along with installing two turbochargers. The result was the engine rated at a reportedly conservative 382 hp (285 kW). The car was classified as a standard Corvette by the EPA, so it wasn't subject to additional registration requirements. Over 500 cars were subject to the conversion.

A derivative of the Twin Turbo Corvette, the 880 hp (656 kW) Callaway SledgeHammer, recorded a speed of 254.76 mph (410.00 km/h) on Ohio's Transportation Research Center track in 1988, making it the fastest road-going car at the time.

== Special editions ==
=== Pace Car Convertible ===
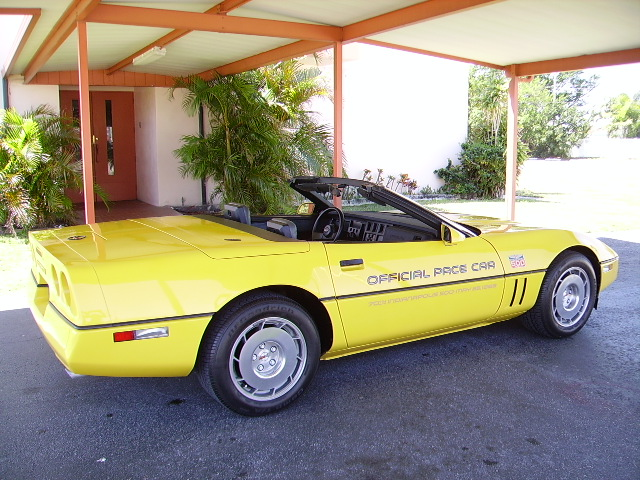
1986 Convertible Indy 500 Pace Car edition

A yellow convertible was the pace car for the 1986 Indianapolis 500 race. This marked the return of the convertible body style, absent from the Corvette lineup since 1975. All 7,315 1986 convertible Corvettes (all exterior colors) had "Indy 500 Pace Car" console identification.

=== 35th Anniversary ===
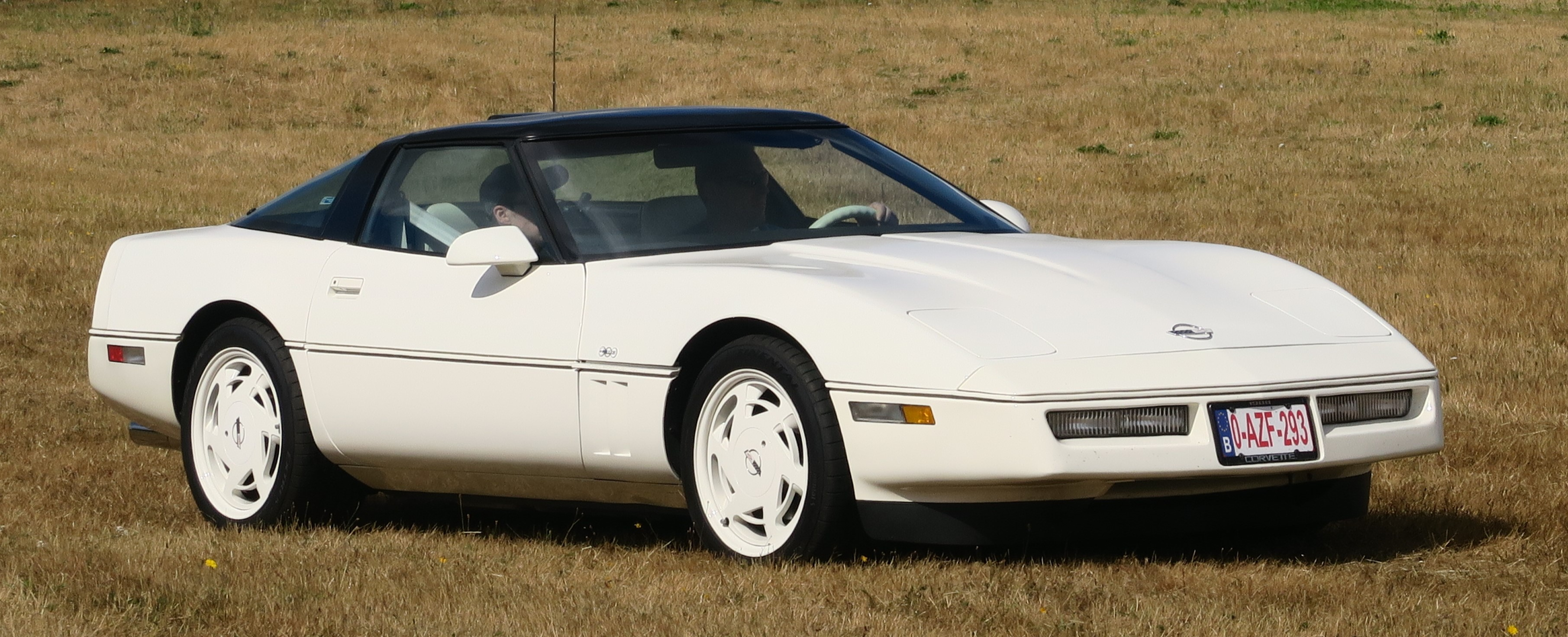
1988 Corvette 35th anniversary edition

The 1988 35th Anniversary edition, also known as the "Triple White Corvette", is a white Corvette fastback coupe with white wheels and white interior (including seats & steering wheel). It also features a removable black top and came equipped with everything, including its own unique emblems. Each 35th Anniversary car is the 2nd Serialized Corvette in the production history of the C4 Corvette, with each car receiving an engraved number plaque on the console. 2,050 cars were built and a quoted 180 of these were manual transmission cars.

=== 40th Anniversary ===
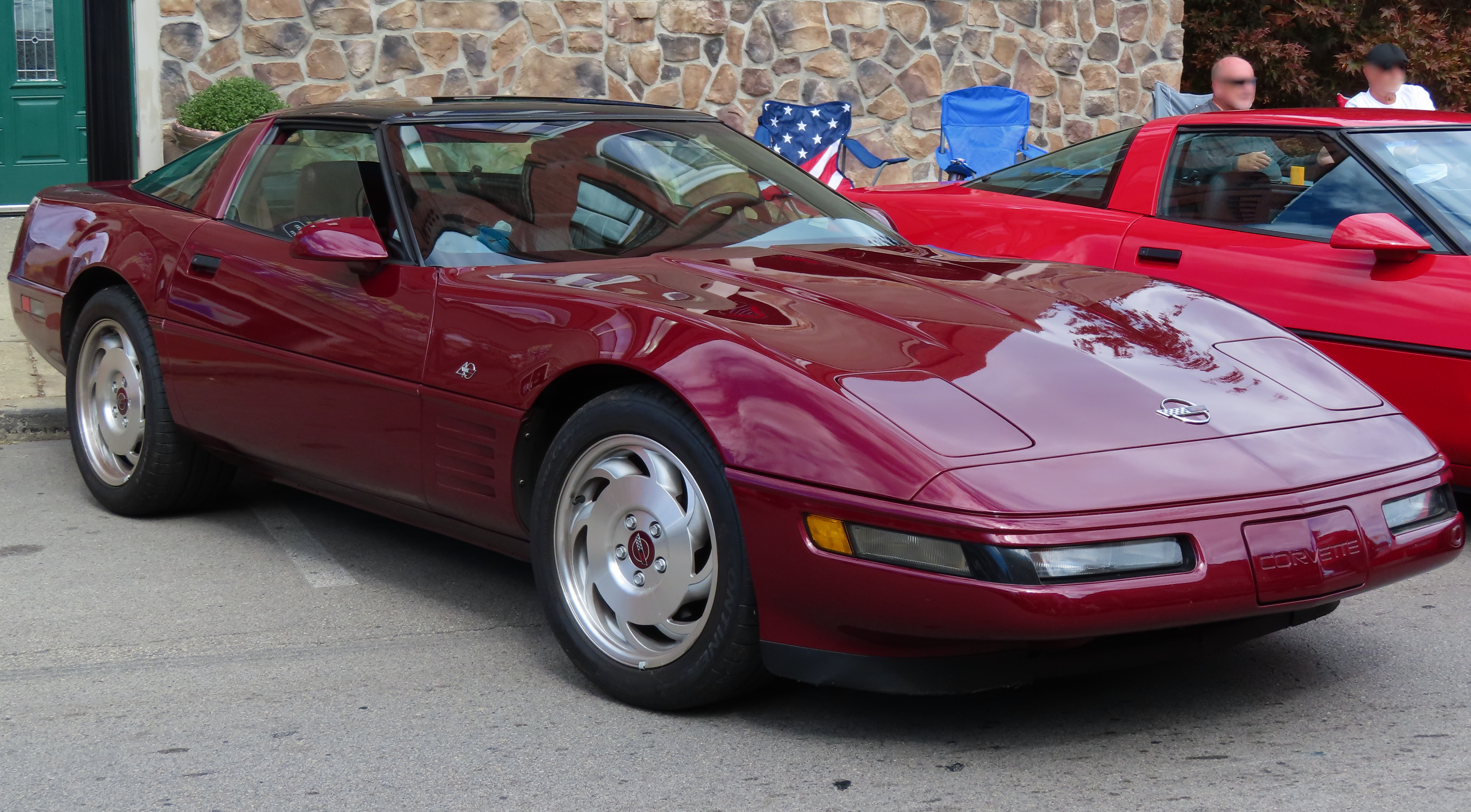
1993 40th Anniversary Coupe

The 1993 40th Anniversary package was available on all models. It included Ruby Red metallic paint and Ruby Red leather sport seats, along with Ruby Red Center Caps on the wheels, special trim and 40th anniversary side emblems. 6,749 were sold at an additional cost of US$1,455. Due to an error on the drawings sent to the seat supplier, all 1993 Corvettes have the 40th emblem embroidered on the seats.

=== Brickyard 400 Festival/Parade Car ===
In 1994, twenty-five (25) Corvette Convertibles were delivered to the Indianapolis Motor Speedway for use in the inaugural running of the Brickyard 400. The Corvettes were primarily used to introduce the 43 NASCAR drivers in a parade lap prior to the start of the race during driver introductions. There were thirteen Red and twelve Black convertibles used, and most carried two drivers on the lap, with their names displayed on the hoods. They also carried civil, NASCAR, and Manufacturer dignitaries on other parade laps, such as "the King" Richard Petty, Bobby Allison, and Mayor Goldsmith of Indianapolis. It is unknown how many of these cars still exist in "full dress" since many dealers just removed the graphics when they received the cars after the race.

=== Indy Pace Car ===
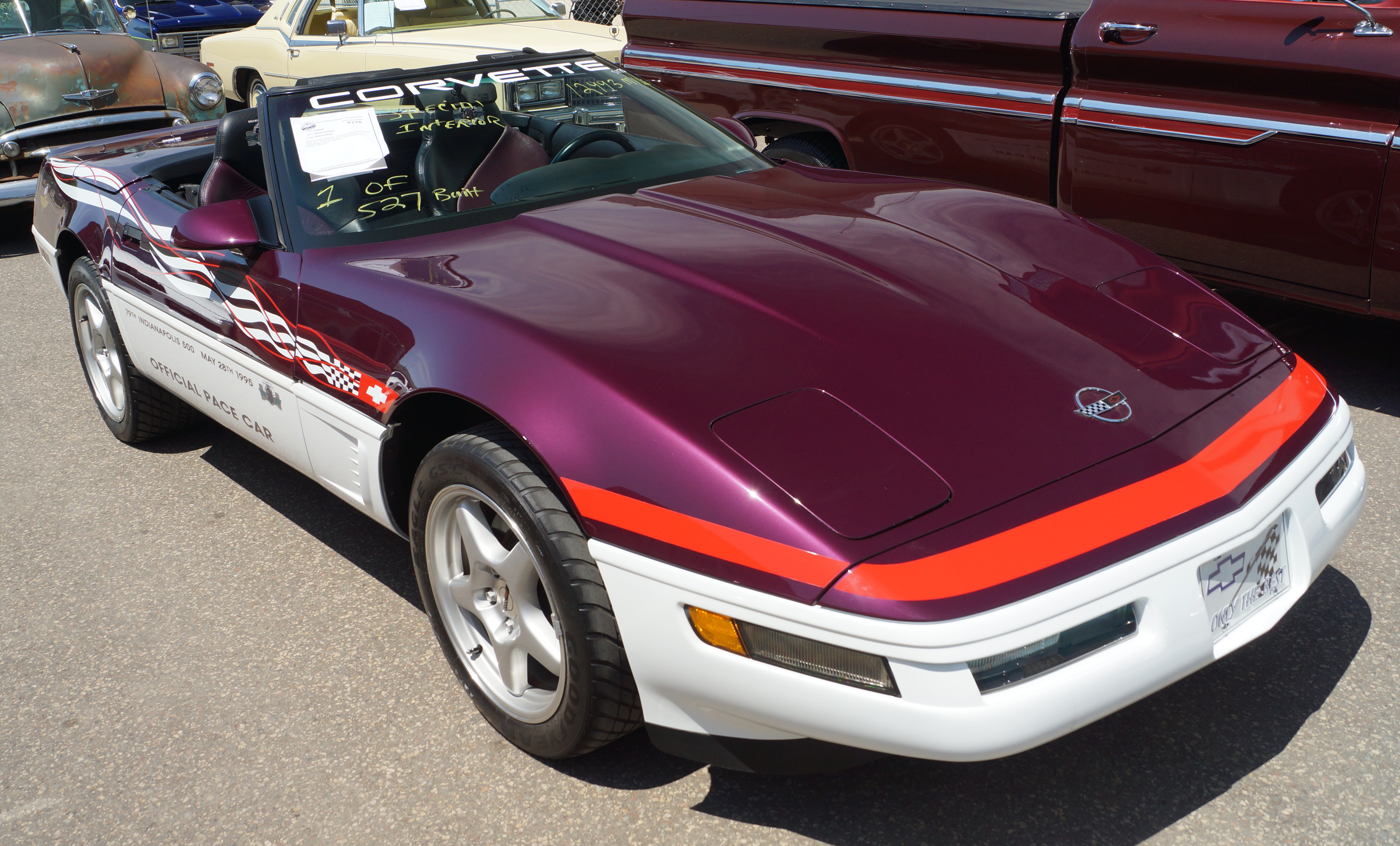
1995 Corvette Indy 500 Pace Car edition (convertible)

In 1995, a C4 convertible was again the pace car for the Indianapolis 500, and a special pace car edition was offered; 527 were built.

=== Grand Sport ===
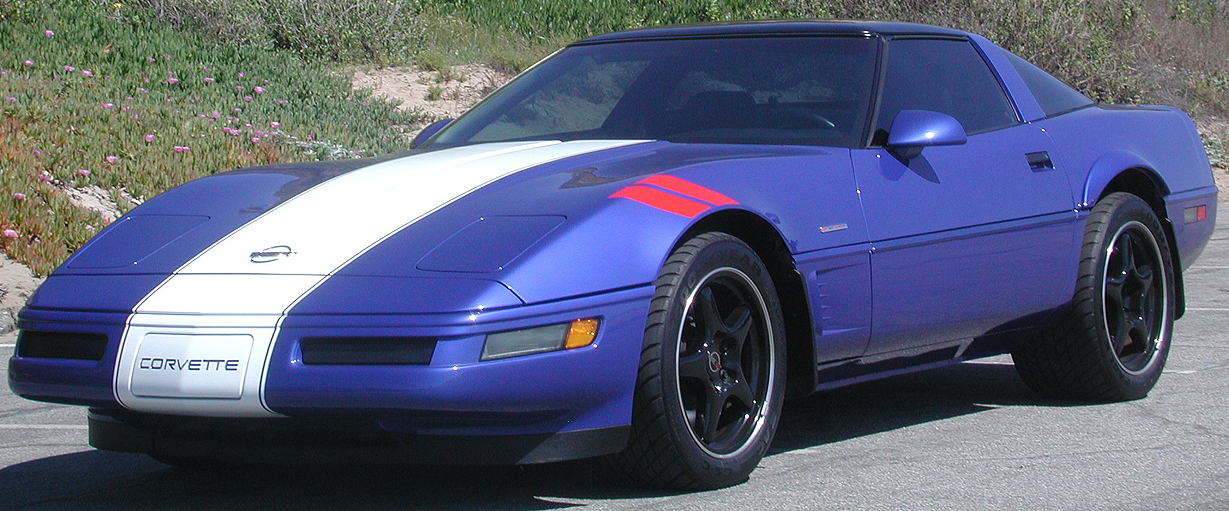
1996 Corvette Grand Sport

Chevrolet released the Grand Sport (GS) version in 1995 to mark the end of production of the C4 Corvette. The Grand Sport moniker is a nod to the original Grand Sport model produced in 1963. A total of 1,000 GS Corvettes were produced: 810 coupes and 190 convertibles. The 1996 GS came with the high-performance LT4 V8 engine, producing 330 hp (246 kW) and 340 lb⋅ft (461 N⋅m) of torque. The Grand Sport came only in Admiral Blue with a white stripe down the middle, 5-spoke black wheels, two red "hash marks" on the front driver's side wheel arch and special seat trim providing a distinctive look. The Grand Sport also has wider tires and the coupes were outfitted with small rear fender flares. The C4 Grand Sport also had a unique VIN compared with the standard C4.

=== Collector Edition ===
The 1996 Collector Edition was the last of the C4 Corvettes, just as the 1982 Collector Edition was the last of the C3s. It included Sebring Silver paint, silver 5-spoke alloy wheels, special emblems and seat trim. Cars equipped with the 6-speed manual came with the LT-4 V8, those with the 4-speed automatic kept the LT-1. Of the 5,412 built, 4,031 were coupes and 1,381 were convertibles. It cost $1,250 more than the base model Corvette.

== Production notes ==
Model Year	Production	Base Price	Notes
1983	43	--	Prototype and pre-production only. There is only one survivor, which is currently held at and owned by the National Corvette Museum.
1984	51,547	$21,800	L83 engine continued from 1982. Manual trans not available by regular production until January 1984 (18 produced in September 1983, factory tested, then delivered to early orders in November 1983). Cross-fire injection utilized.
1985	39,729	$24,891	More powerful and fuel efficient L98 engine introduced. Cross-fire injection replaced with more efficient tuned port injection system.
1986	35,109	$27,027	First convertible since 1975. All 7,315 have Indy 500 pace car console ID plaque. New were third brake light, anti-lock brakes, electronic climate control, and key-code anti-theft system.
1987	30,632	$27,999	V8 engine now has roller hydraulic lifters increasing HP to 240. Callaway twin-turbo offered through dealers with GM warranty.
1988	22,789	$29,480	Changes in suspension. New wheel design. All white 35th Anniversary special edition coupe.
1989	26,412	$32,045	ZF 6-speed manual replaces Doug Nash 4+3 transmission.
1990	23,646	$32,479	ZR1 is introduced with DOHC LT5 engine. Interior redesigned to incorporate driver's side airbag. New optional Delco/Bose "Gold" 200-watt six-speaker sound system.
1991	20,639	$33,005	Restyled exterior. Last year for the Callaway B2K twin turbo.
1992	20,479	$33,635	-New LT1 engine replaces the L98. -Traction control is standard. Called ASR (Automated Slip Regulation System). -Improved weather seals and additional isolation was added to door panels and transmission tunnel to reduce noise. -Exhaust tips change from dual circular to single rectangular. -Dash changes from black and gray to all black.
1993	21,590	$34,595	-40th Anniversary special edition. -Passive keyless entry is a new standard feature. -Minor engine modifications to LT1 engine to make it quieter and increased torque from 330 pound-feet to 340 pound-feet. -Instead of painted finish Saw blade wheels are now machined finish and remains and standard wheel.
1994	23,330	$36,185	-Revised steering wheel is now a two-spoke design. -Revised interior on dash and inside door panels. -Sport seats are redesigned and wider that earlier models. -Electric seats are now controlled from a switch panel on the center console. -Addition of passenger airbag, while glovebox gets deleted -Revised air conditioning system to use R-134a refrigerant. -LT1 receives mass air flow (MAF) sequential-port fuel injection (SFI) system to improve engines's responsiveness, iddle quality and drivability. -LT1 receives new ignition system to reduce start time specially in colder weather -4L60E 4-speed automatic transmission is now an electronically controlled version of the 700R4. -Safety interlock system added to the transmission requires driver to press brake pedal in order to shift the transmission out of park. -Tire jack is moved from rear spare tire well to a compartment behind the passenger seat.
1995	20,742	$36,785	Last year of the ZR1. Gen II Opti-Spark distributor. Minor exterior restyling. Indy Pace Car special edition.
1996	21,537	$37,225	Final year for the C4, Optional LT4 engine with 330 hp (246 kW). Collector Edition and Grand Sport special editions. Only C4 year with OBD-II diagnostics. Selective Real Time Damping is a new option.
Total	358,180		

== Engines ==
Engine	Model Year	Power	Torque
5.7 L (350 cu in) L83 V8	1984	205 hp (153 kW)	290 lb⋅ft (393 N⋅m)
5.7 L (350 cu in) L98 V8	1985–1986	230 hp (172 kW)	330 lb⋅ft (447 N⋅m)
5.7 L (350 cu in) L98 V8	1987–1989	240 hp (179 kW)	345 lb⋅ft (468 N⋅m)
5.7 L (350 cu in) L98 V8	1987 (B2K Callaway)	345 hp (257 kW)	465 lb⋅ft (630 N⋅m)
5.7 L (350 cu in) L98 V8	1988–1989 (auto coupes with 3.07 rear)	245 hp (183 kW)	345 lb⋅ft (468 N⋅m)
5.7 L (350 cu in) L98 V8	1988–1989 (B2K Callaway)	382 hp (285 kW)	562 lb⋅ft (762 N⋅m)
5.7 L (350 cu in) L98 V8	1990–1991	245 hp (183 kW)	345 lb⋅ft (468 N⋅m)
5.7 L (350 cu in) L98 V8	1990–1991 (auto coupes with 3.07 rear)	250 hp (186 kW)	345 lb⋅ft (468 N⋅m)
5.7 L (350 cu in) L98 V8	1990–1991 (B2K Callaway)	403 hp (301 kW)	575 lb⋅ft (780 N⋅m)
5.7 L (350 cu in) LT5 V8	1990–1992 (ZR1)	375 hp (280 kW)	370 lb⋅ft (502 N⋅m)
5.7 L (350 cu in) LT5 V8	1993–1995 (ZR1)	405 hp (302 kW)	385 lb⋅ft (522 N⋅m)
5.7 L (350 cu in) LT1 V8	1992	300 hp (224 kW)	330 lb⋅ft (447 N⋅m)
5.7 L (350 cu in) LT1 V8	1993–1995	300 hp (224 kW)	340 lb⋅ft (461 N⋅m)
5.7 L (350 cu in) LT1 V8	1996	300 hp (224 kW)	335 lb⋅ft (454 N⋅m)
5.7 L (350 cu in) LT4 V8	1995–1996 (with manual transmission) (Grand Sport)	330 hp (246 kW)	340 lb⋅ft (461 N⋅m)

== Concept cars ==
=== Ramarro ===
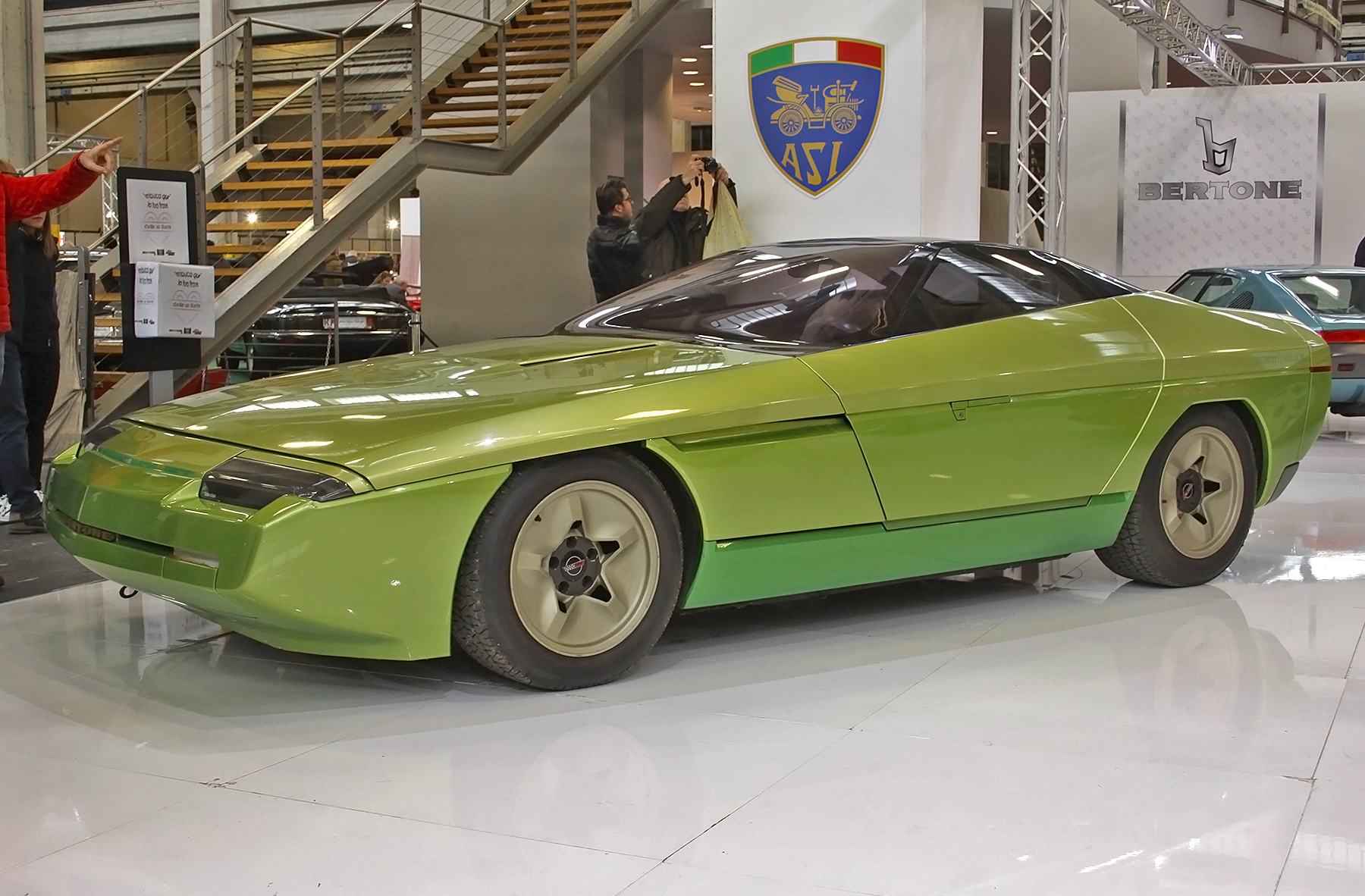
C4-based Bertone Ramarro, designed and built by Bertone, debuted in 1984

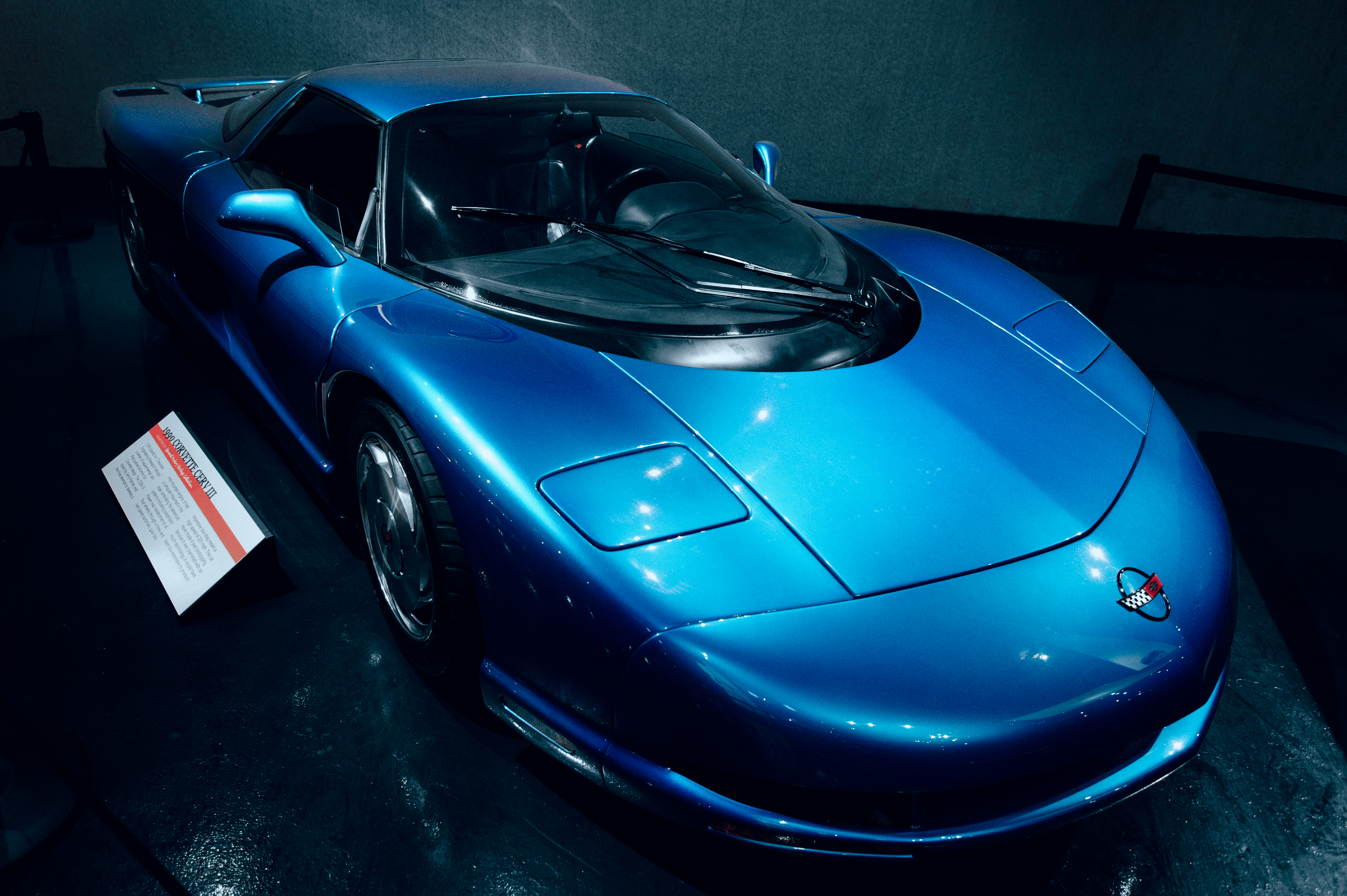
CERV III (1990)

The Ramarro is a restyled version of the C4 Corvette built by Italian design house Gruppo Bertone. The concept was unveiled in 1984 at the Los Angeles Auto Show, going on to win Auto&Design's Car Design Award in 1985. It is named after an Italian word meaning "green lizard".

=== CERV III ===
In June 1985, Chevrolet Chief Engineer Don Runkle and Lotus' Tony Rudd discussed creating a new show car to show off their engineering expertise. It was first unveiled at the Detroit Auto Show in January 1986 as the Corvette Indy concept car. By 1990, the project evolved into the CERV III (Corporate Engineering Research Vehicle III), which was a prototype closer to a production-ready vehicle. It was not approved for production due to its high cost.

=== ZR2 ===
The ZR2, also called the 'Big Doggie', is a concept model based on a C4 Corvette, but with a much larger 7.4 L (454 cu in) big block OHV V8 engine with multi-port fuel injection similar to the tuned port injection found on the 1985–1991 base model and a 6-speed manual transmission.

The vehicle was built in 1989 by Corvette Development Engineering as a development car to study the possibility of achieving the performance of the ZR1 while reducing cost by utilizing a big block engine. The engine was rated at 400 hp (406 PS; 298 kW).

The prototype vehicle, orange with black interior, was sold in 2009 at the Barrett-Jackson Collector Car Auction for US$71,500 (~$104,134 in 2025).

== Racing ==
=== Corvette GTP (IMSA) ===
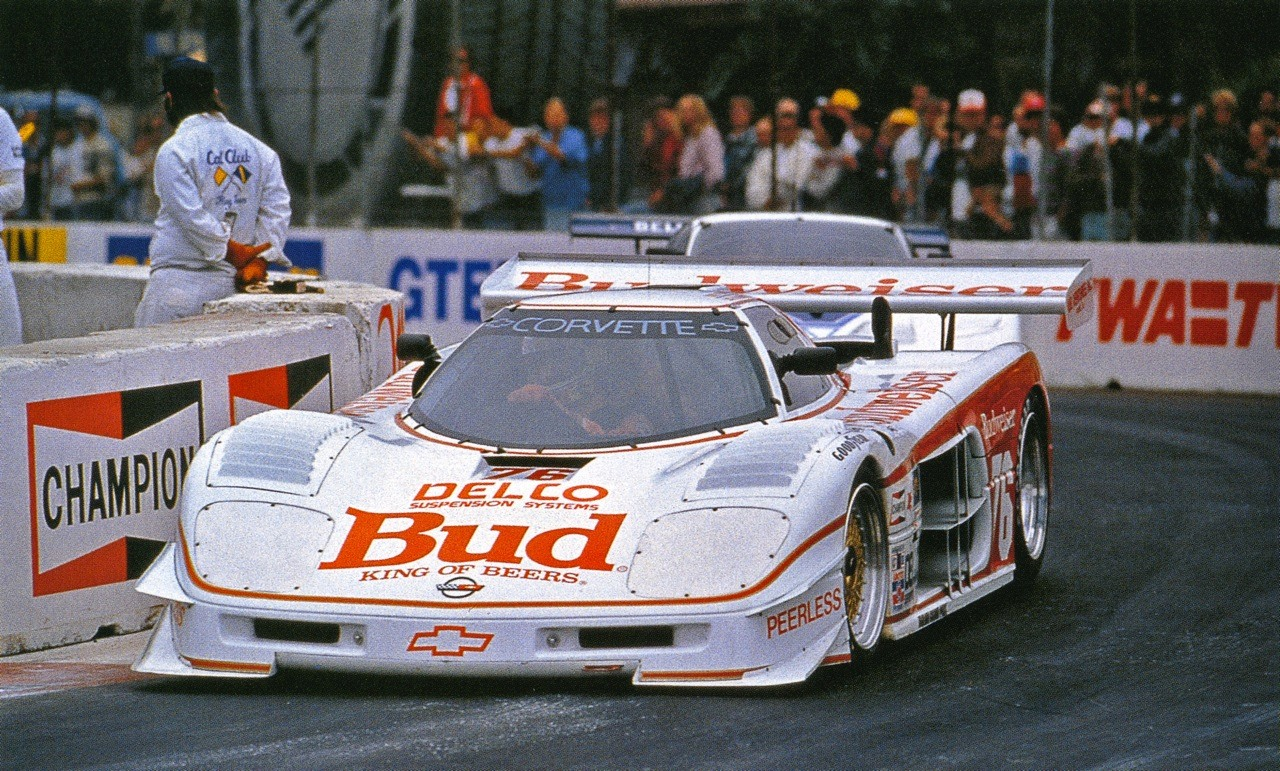
The Corvette GTP of Peerless Racing

As part of GM's initiative to promote the new C4 Corvette, the company funded a program in the IMSA GT Championship to run a GTP-class prototype under the Corvette name, mostly run by Hendrick Motorsports. Although the Corvette GTP actually shared very little with the production C4 Corvette, including the lack of a V8* engine in some races, it did use some styling cues. The project lasted until 1988 with mixed success.

The final Corvette GTP built (HU8811.01), as raced by Peerless Racing, underwent extensive wind tunnel testing by GM, with many of the 'aero' developments (such as the short tail design) being used in later production C4s. The Peerless GTP Corvette also went back to the V8 small block engine from the turbocharged V6. This final GTP Corvette (Peerless) was driven by Hobbs, Baldwin, Villeneuve and Goodyear in IMSA before having the BBC-based Eagle (10.2) engine installed to take to attempt to race at the Le Mans 24 Hours in 1990.

== Le Mans ==
The C4 also made an appearance in international sports car endurance racing in a project orchestrated by former Corvette Cup driver Doug Rippie. The car, based on the ZR1 trim C4, competed in the popular GT1 class in 1995 at Le Mans and Sebring, where it momentarily led.
