= National Corvette Museum =

Tourist attraction in Bowling Green, Kentucky

Coordinates: 37°00′15″N 86°22′30″W

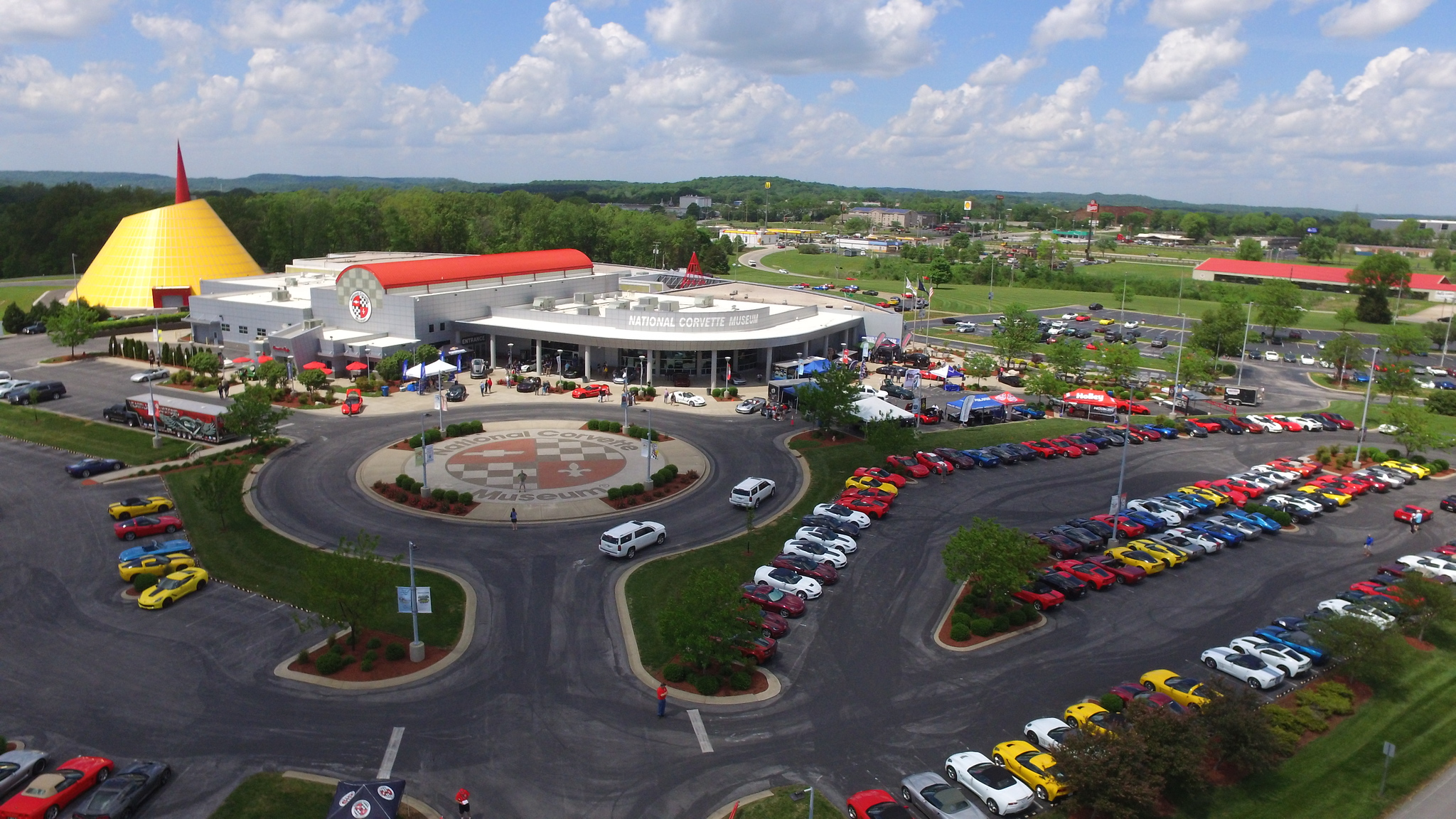
- Aerial view of the National Corvette Museum
- Established: September 1994; 32 years ago
- Location: 350 Corvette Drive; Bowling Green, Kentucky
- Type: Automobile
- Visitors: 200000
- President: Bryce Burklow
- Owner: 501c3
- Website: www.corvettemuseum.org

The National Corvette Museum showcases the Chevrolet Corvette, an American sports car that has been in production since 1953. It is located in Bowling Green, Kentucky, off Interstate 65's Exit 28 and near the General Motors' Bowling Green Assembly Plant, where Corvettes are solely manufactured. It was constructed in 1994. It was opened to the public in September of that year.

In September 2026, the museum opened its 66,000-square-foot Collection Facility to create space for future growth of its Corvette collection. Public tours of the Collections Facility are scheduled to open in early 2027. The museum was recently gifted a 1967 Corvette Sting Ray, once owned by the first man on the moon, astronaut Neil Armstrong.

== 2014 Sinkhole in the Skydome ==
On February 12, 2014, a sinkhole opened under the floor of the Skydome area of the museum at around 5:44 AM local time, causing a portion of the floor to collapse. Kentucky is one of the many states that is notable for having karst topography. Karst topography is the landscape that is formed from the dissolving of rocks such as limestone. In the museum's case, the sinkhole was caused by the dissolving of the limestone in the ground which caused pockets to open underneath the surface. Eventually, the weight of the building caused the top layer of soil to collapse. Eight rare and one-of-a-kind Corvettes, portions of the display stands, rails, large concrete floor, slabs and dirt fell into the sinkhole, causing serious damage to some of the Corvettes. The Corvettes involved have an estimated value of a million dollars.

The remaining 20 cars in the Skydome were immediately removed from that area. Between March 3, 2014, and March 6, 2014, 5 of the 8 Corvettes were recovered from the sinkhole. The spire area of the Skydome was reinforced before work started on removing the final three buried cars. Multiple multigravity tests were done to ensure that another sinkhole wasn't present or in the making. The results came back clear which allowed for the construction work to begin. For an added precaution, micropiles, or systems of steel rods, were inserted into the ground before the concrete was repoured to help give the building more support. The museum reopened the day after the sinkhole appeared.

An exhibit opened in the museum two years later to tell the story of what happened that day and why it happened. This exhibit gives visitors the chance to virtually recover the cars that were in the sinkhole.

== Hall of Fame ==
The museum also sponsors the Corvette Hall of Fame for individuals who have been involved with the Corvette automobile and made significant contributions in their respective fields. Each year, from two to six persons have been inducted into this select group. Members have been divided into three categories: enthusiasts, GM/Chevrolet, and racing.

Honorees
Year	Names	Category
1998	Bill Mitchell	GM/Chevrolet
1998	Harley Earl	GM/Chevrolet
1998	Larry Shinoda	GM/Chevrolet
1998	Joe Pike	GM/Chevrolet
1998	Ed Cole	GM/Chevrolet
1998	Zora Arkus-Duntov	GM/Chevrolet
1999	Jim Perkins	GM/Chevrolet
1999	Dave McLellan	GM/Chevrolet
1999	Dick Guldstrand	Racing
2000	John Fitch	Racing
2000	Dick Thompson	Racing
2000	Jerry Palmer	GM/Chevrolet
2001	Gibson Hufstader	GM/Chevrolet
2001	Joseph Spielman	GM/Chevrolet
2001	Betty Skelton	Racing
2002	John Cafaro	GM/Chevrolet
2002	Jim Jeffords	Racing
2002	Myron Scott	GM/Chevrolet
2003	Noland Adams	Enthusiast
2003	Robert Morrison	Enthusiast
2004	Ray Battaglini	Enthusiast
2004	Darrel Bowlin	Enthusiast
2004	Jon Brookmyer	Enthusiast
2004	Dan Gale	Enthusiast
2004	Terry McManmon	Enthusiast
2005	Chip Miller	Enthusiast
2005	Randy Wittine	GM/Chevrolet
2005	Don Yenko	Racing
2006	Dave Hill	GM/Chevrolet
2006	John Lingenfelter	Racing
2006	Gary Mortimer	Enthusiast
2007	Doug Hooper	Racing
2007	Gordon Killebrew	Enthusiast
2007	Carl Renner	GM/Chevrolet
2008	Allan and Don Barker	Racing
2008	Reeves Callaway	Enthusiast
2008	Maurice Olley	GM/Chevrolet
2009	Duane Bohnstedt	GM/Chevrolet
2009	Tony De Lorenzo and Jer Thompson	Racing
2009	John Hinckley	Enthusiast
2010	Grady Davis	Racing
2010	Fred Gallasch	Enthusiast
2010	Jim Ingle	GM/Chevrolet
2011	Clare "Mac" MacKichan	GM/Chevrolet
2011	Ray Quinlan	Enthusiast
2011	Ron Fellows	Racing
2012	Andy Pilgrim	Racing
2012	Gary Claudio	GM/Chevrolet
2012	Patrick Dolan	Enthusiast
2012	Bob McDorman	Enthusiast
2013	Johnny O'Connell	Racing
2013	Wil Cooksey	GM/Chevrolet
2013	Werner Meier	Enthusiast
2014	Dave MacDonald	Racing
2014	John Heinricy	GM/Chevrolet
2014	Jerry Burton	Enthusiast
2015	Herb Fishel	Racing
2015	Russ McLean	GM/Chevrolet
2015	Rick Hendrick	Enthusiast
2016	Bob Bondurant	Racing
2016	Ralph Kramer	GM/Chevrolet
2016	Donna Mae Mims	Enthusiast
2017	Tommy Morrison	Racing
2017	Jim Minneker	GM/Chevrolet
2017	Peter Brock	Enthusiast
2018	Burt and John Greenwood	Racing
2018	Tom Wallace	GM/Chevrolet
2018	Mike Yager	Enthusiast
2019	Briggs Cunningham	Racing
2019	Tom Peters	GM/Chevrolet
2019	Dollie Cole	Enthusiast
2020	Doug Fehan	Racing
2020	Henry Haga	GM/Chevrolet
2020	Wendell Strode	Enthusiast
2020	Mike McCagh	Enthusiast
2022	Gary Pratt and Jim Miller	Racing
2022	Ed Welburn	GM/Chevrolet
2022	Elfi Arkus-Duntov	Enthusiast
2023	Dan Binks	Racing
2023	David Wickman	GM/Chevrolet
2023	John Amgwert	Enthusiast
2024	Oliver Gavin & Jan Magnussen	Racing
2024	Tadge Juechter	GM/Chevrolet
2024	Richard Prince	Enthusiast
2025	Kim Baker	Racing
2025	Chuck Jordan	GM/Chevrolet
2025	Jim & Charley Robertson	Enthusiast
2026	John Middlebrook	Racing
2026	Kirk Bennion & Harlan Charles	GM/Chevrolet
2026	James Schefter	Enthusiast

== See also ==
- List of sinkholes of the United States
