= Bertone Ramarro =

Concept car designed by Bertone

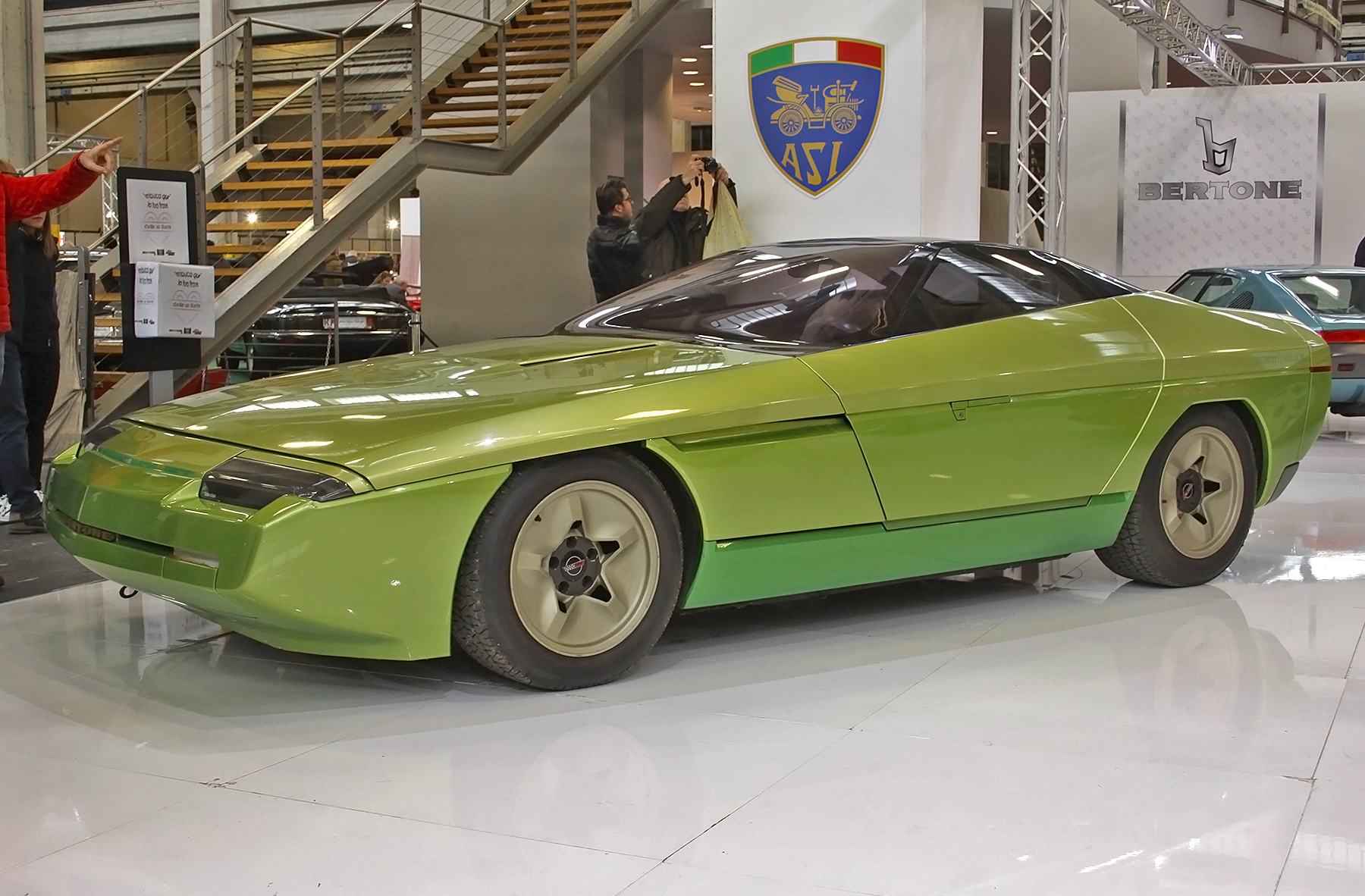

Overview
- Manufacturer: Bertone
- Also called: Bertone Corvette Ramarro
- Production: 1984; 1 built
- Designer: Marc Deschamps and Eugenio Pagliano at Bertone

Body and chassis
- Class: Concept car
- Body style: 2-door coupé
- Layout: Front mid-engine, rear-wheel-drive
- Doors: Sliding doors
- Related: Chevrolet Corvette (C4)

Powertrain
- Engine: 350 cu in (5.7 L) Chevrolet L98 V8
- Transmission: 4-speed automatic

Dimensions
- Wheelbase: 2,440 mm (96.1 in)
- Length: 4,150 mm (163.4 in)
- Width: 1,920 mm (75.6 in)
- Height: 1,190 mm (46.9 in)
- Curb weight: 1,400 kg (3,086 lb)

The Bertone Ramarro is an Italian concept car designed and built by Bertone and based on the Chevrolet Corvette (C4). It debuted in 1984 at the Los Angeles Auto Show. The name "ramarro" comes from the Italian word for "green lizard".

== Specifications ==
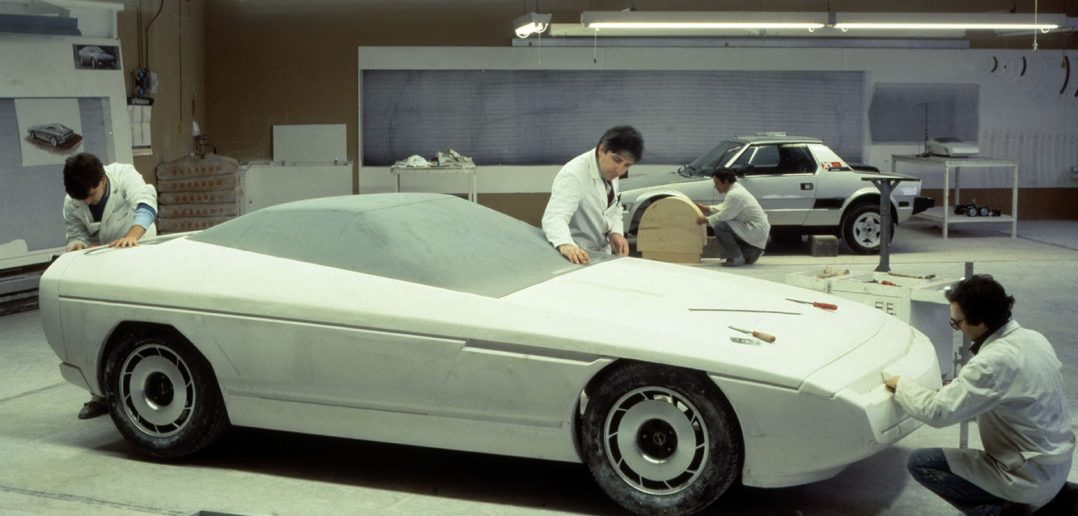
Full size model of the Ramarro being worked on at Bertone's Stile SpA facility in Caprie

The Ramarro uses the chassis from a 1984 C4 Corvette, the same car used to unveil the C4 to the European press at the 1983 Geneva Motor Show. Chevrolet gave Bertone that car to use to build the Ramarro, as well as a port fuel injection V8 engine from the newer 1985 Corvette. The engine remains mostly stock but the radiator and air conditioning have been moved to the back of the car, taking the place of the spare tire which was moved in front of the engine, in order to allow Bertone to design the body with a more tapered, sealed off nose for better airflow and aerodynamics. In order to get air into the radiator, air intakes were placed just behind the rear window on both sides. The covers over this intake are reportedly opened and closed thermostatically, with airflow assisted by three electric fans. The only other mechanical change was the addition of experimental Michelin tyres in place of the original Goodyear units. These new tyres measure 280/45VR-17 in the rear and 240/45VR-17 in the front. On the outside, the Ramarro also features sliding doors that slide forward towards the nose of the car, making them easier to open in tight parking spots versus conventional doors which had a wide opening span. Many reviewers have drawn a comparison between these and the doors on the 1954 Kaiser Darrin, but the Ramarro's doors are different in that they slide out and forwards, whereas the doors on the Darrin retracted into the front fenders.

=== Interior ===
The interior of the Ramarro retains the Corvette's factory digital instrumentation and emergency brake handle, but most of the original interior has been replaced by custom pieces. The two front seats are combined into a sculpted single-piece unit that moves as one seat, but has a hump in the middle for the center console, which is where the seats are mounted to, rather than to the floor. The backs of the seats can fold toward the center to allow access to storage behind the seats. The interior was retrimmed in specially patterned green leather that was picked to match the exterior and also to resemble the colour and texture of lizard skin, a nod to the Ramarro name. Finally, the Corvette's original automatic transmission was kept but the shift lever was replaced by a large rotary dial gear selector in the center console.

== History ==
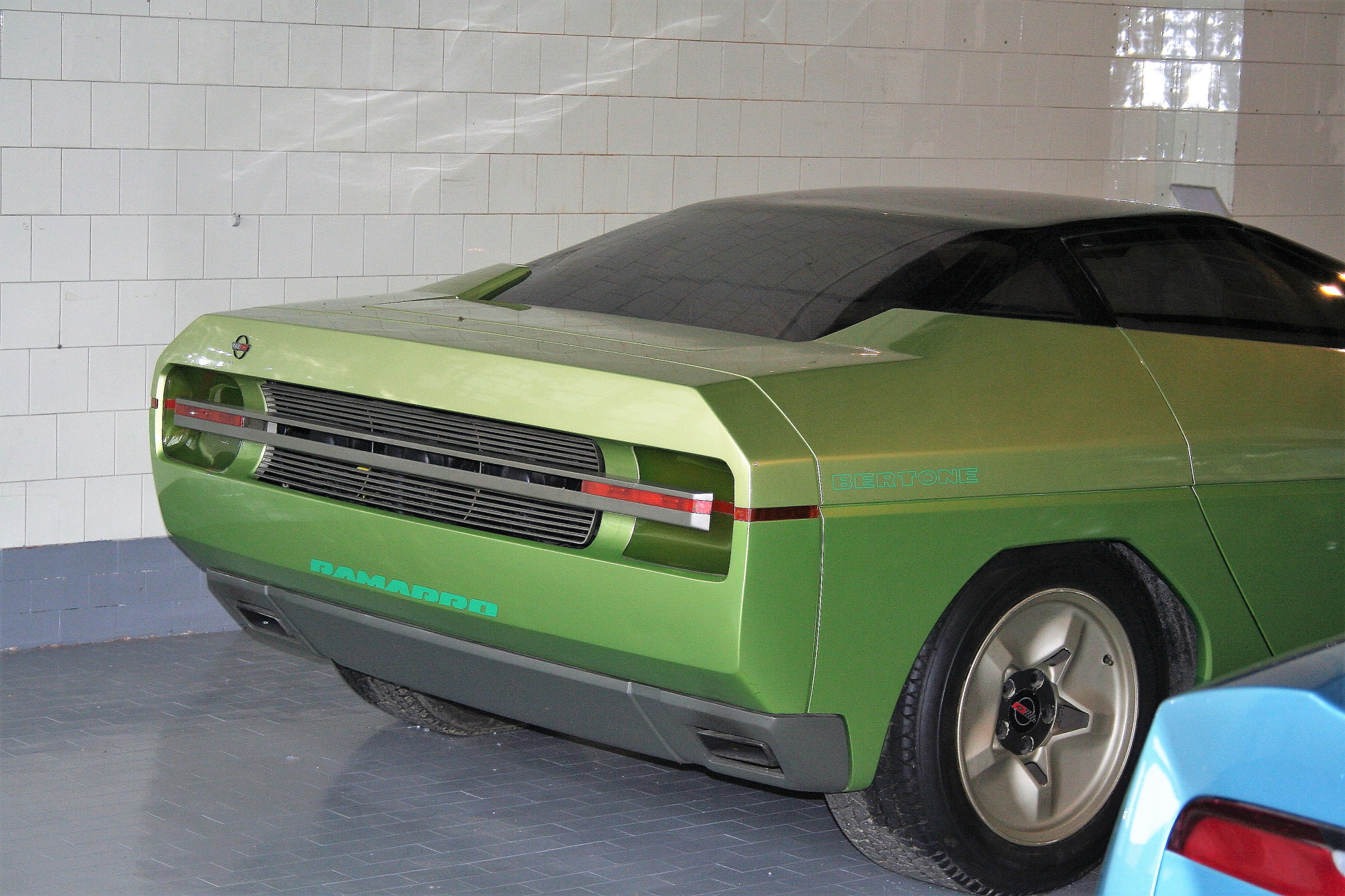
Rear view

Nuccio Bertone reportedly started the Ramarro project because it presented a challenge, and because most of the cars with Bertone-designed bodies were sold in America, yet they featured the name of the automaker first and Bertone second, so Bertone wanted to have a car to show in America that bore the "Bertone" name first and foremost. Initially, names such as “Condor” and “Photon” were considered, before "Ramarro" was chosen, Italian for a type of green lizard that can be found in the countryside around Caprie, which was then used as inspiration for the color scheme of the car.

== Reception ==
Bertone originally intended to unveil the car at the Turin Auto Show in the spring of 1984, but the show ended up being rescheduled to a few months later, and since the Ramarro was based on the American Corvette, they made the decision to unveil it at the 1984 LA Auto Show instead. The Ramarro was well received at the show and later in 1985 was awarded Auto&Design's Car Design Award for its “bold ideas,” which they say gave “the Chevrolet Corvette an entirely new personality.”
