= Chevrolet Corvette GTP =

American prototype racing car

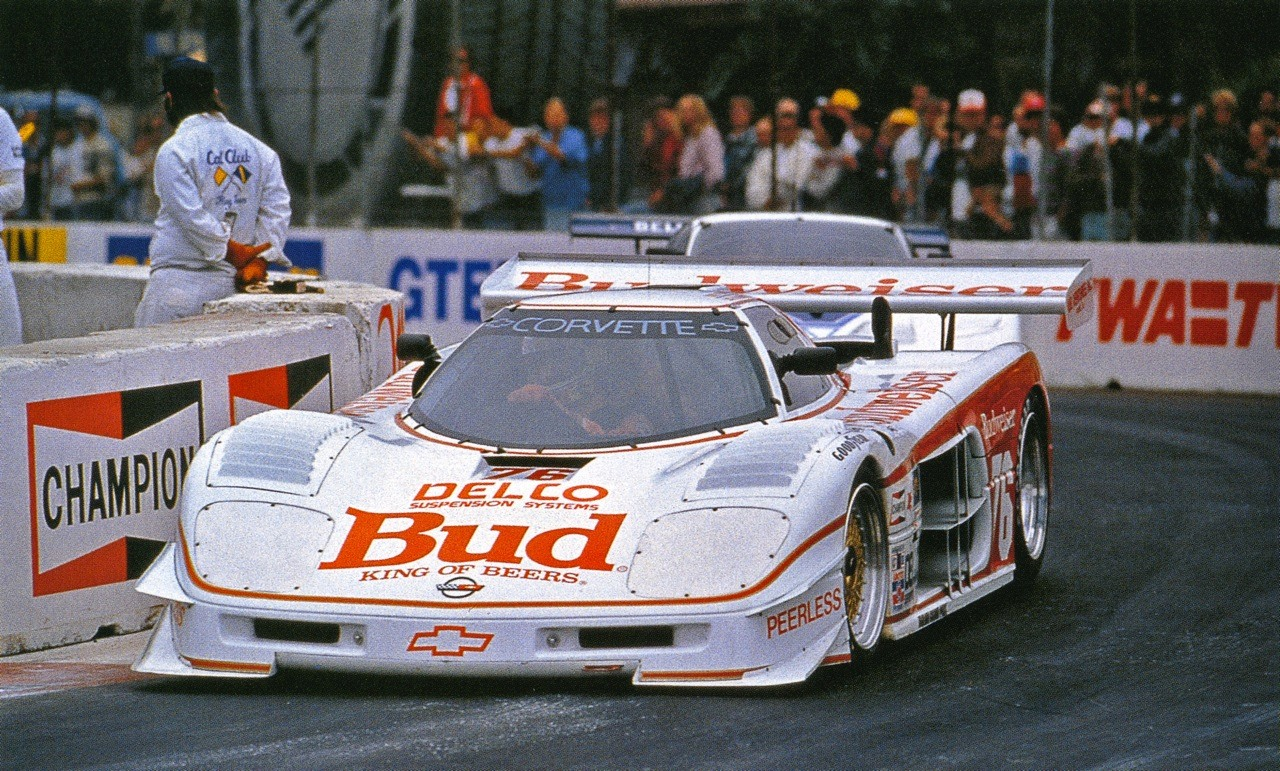
- Category: IMSA GTP
- Constructor: Chevrolet (Lola)
- Designer: Randy Whitten

Technical specifications
- Engine: Chevrolet 3.4 L (207 cu in) V6 turbocharged mid-mounted
- Transmission: 5-speed manual
- Weight: 880 kg (1,940 lb)
- Tires: Goodyear Eagle

Competition history
- Notable entrants: (United States) GM Goodwrench (United States) Hendrick Motorsports (United States) Lee Racing (United States) Peerless Racing
- First win: 1986 Atlanta Journal-Constitution Grand Prix
- Last win: 1986 Grand Prix of Palm Beach
Races	Wins	Podiums
60	2	8

The Chevrolet Corvette GTP was an American Grand Touring Prototype-class sports prototype racing car which successfully participated in the IMSA Camel GT from 1984 until 1989. The car was professionally fielded in competition as General Motors' Chevrolet Corvette C4 official factory team effort in the IMSA GTP class.

== Development ==
Prior to 1984, Chevrolet naturally aspirated V8s and Buick turbocharged V6s were popular engines in the GTP class for privateer teams. General Motors (GM) saw the opportunity to enter the IMSA GT Championship for themselves in the 1984 season in competing against Jaguar, Porsche, Nissan and Mazda, but more importantly to expand and explore the limits of the V8 and V6 engine programs.

General Motors' Chevrolet Corvette C4 race engineering team developed the car partnering with Lola Cars International, who had previous experience building cars for Mazda, to build their own chassis dubbed the Corvette GTP. Following testing on an older Lola T600 equipped with a Chevrolet V8, an all new car was built, identified as the T710. The first chassis was delivered to General Motors in 1984 and outfitted with a 3.4-litre turbocharged V6 built by Ryan Falconer, a destroked version of the 4.3-liter Chevrolet V6. A second chassis, known as T711 used a Chevrolet Corvette C4-derived 5.7-liter naturally aspirated V8 developing 800 hp, and was campaigned by Lee Racing.

The cars featured bodywork similar to a Chevrolet Corvette C4 at the front, with a long pontoon-style tail featuring Corvette tail lights. Large side intakes would feed the radiators while the V6 turbocharged chassis had a snorkel built into the top of the fender to feed the turbocharger. Body evolution over the next few years included a change to the side intake and exploring a short tail layout and dual element rear wing.

=== Evolution ===
Following the successful first full season for the Corvette GTP in 1985, GM added two new chassis for 1986. Termed T86/10, the new cars featured evolved bodywork but remained essentially unchanged for the start of the season. The biggest difference was chassis HU01 sported a naturally aspirated V8, while chassis HU02 maintained the V6 power, but received a new shorter tail section.

In 1987 two more chassis were added to the GM racing team fleet. The first, designated T86/12, used an active suspension system that would allow the car to alter its suspension stiffness during the race. The second chassis was a 1987-specification T87/10 which retained the turbocharged V6 power plant, but also ran both a Chevrolet Corvette race-spec V8.

=== Peerless Eagle 700 ===
Following the abandonment of the project at the end of 1988 by General Motors, Peerless Racing purchased a new Corvette GTP from the factory, and it was campaigned in a partial season effort in 1989. After that season the decision was made to take Peerless' car into international racing, entering the 1990 24 Hours of Le Mans. The car was used as a platform for 'Eagle Performance Engines' in an attempt to use a naturally-aspirated, 10.2-liter 4-cam, 32-valve, V8 Big Block Chevrolet to take on large manufacturers at Le Mans. The car was slightly modified to the point that Eagle chose to rename it the Eagle 700. Beyond the modifications necessary to house the large V8 engine internally, the car remained the same as it was run in IMSA series, including a short-tail design that GM had been developing for 1989. Hu8811-01 has been returned to its original state as was raced by Peerless Racing in the IMSA Series in Bud livery but the monster Eagle engine remains with the car as part of its racing and Corvette history.

== Racing history ==
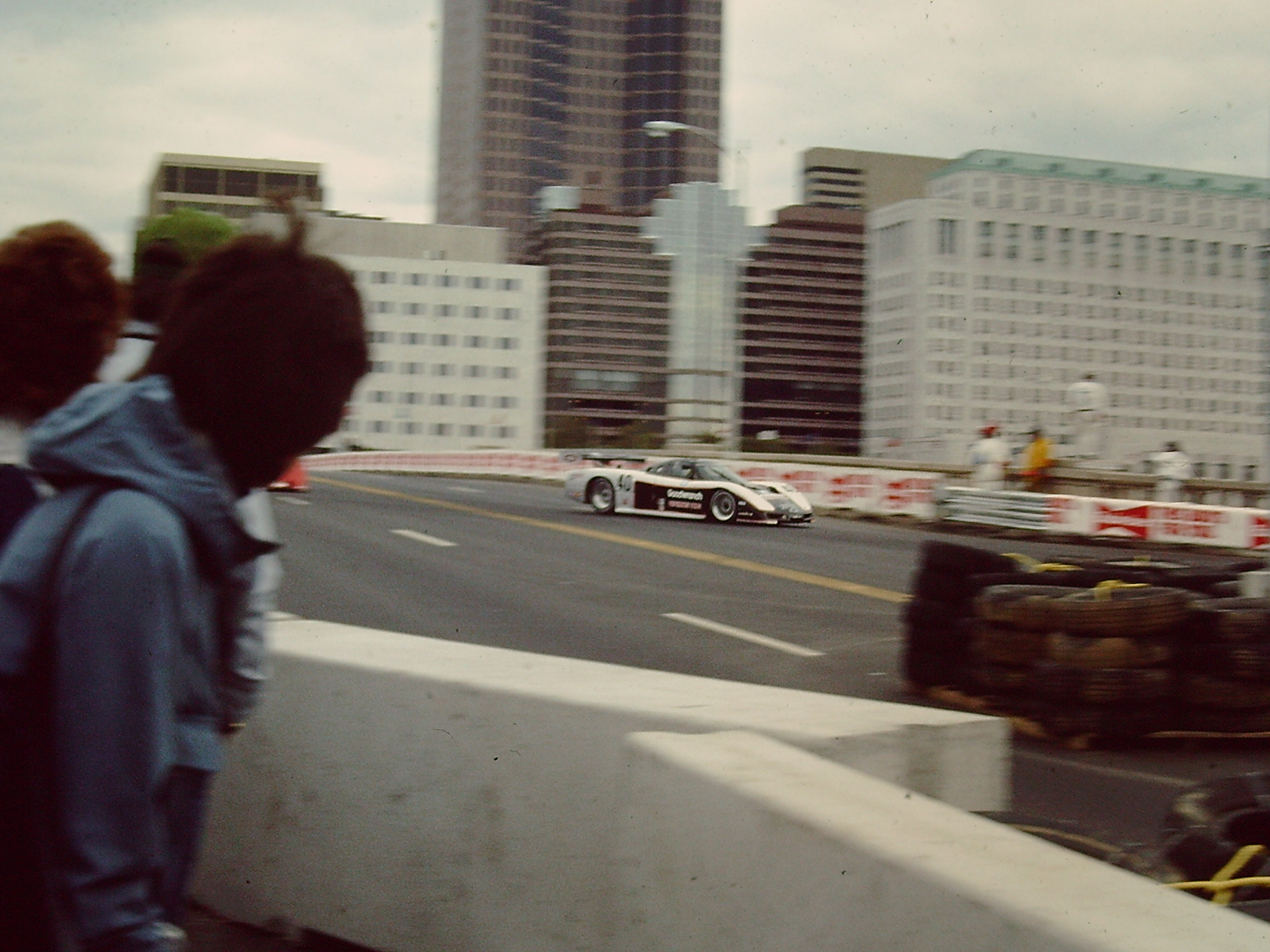
GTP Corvette at the Columbus 500

For 1985, the first Corvette GTP chassis was initially given to Lee Racing for its debut at the 24 Hours of Daytona but suffered gearbox problems and did not finish. This was followed by a seventh-place finish at Miami, then another failure to finish at the 12 Hours of Sebring. This was followed by a string of failures at Charlotte, Mid-Ohio, and Watkins Glen. By mid-season Hendrick Motorsports debuted their factory-backed team with GM Goodwrench sponsorship and leading driver David Hobbs. The team did not finish any races by the end of the season, although Lee Racing did rebound to score seventh-, eighth- and tenth-place finishes for the season.

Into 1986, Hendrick Motorsports and Lee Racing continued their campaign with mixed results. Although both teams failed to finish the first three races of the season, Hendrick took the first victory for the Corvette GTP at Road Atlanta for Doc Bundy and Sarel van der Merwe. However, by that time Lee Racing abandoned their effort. Hendrick continued and had a fourth-place finish at Charlotte, seventh at Lime Rock, and third at Mid-Ohio. A third Corvette GTP Lola chassis entered the season in May and campaigned by Hendrick would take the Corvette GTP's second victory on the streets of Palm Beach, defeating a Porsche 962 by four tenths of a second. The 1986 season would see the only two first-place finishes by a Corvette GTP during their racing career.

Hendrick started 1987 the same way they had 1986, failing to finish the first race of the season, mixed with relatively strong finishes, even suffering from a fire during the Miami event. Following a short stint of problems, the duo finished fourth and seventh at Portland, followed quickly by a lone third at Sears Point. One final third came in the streets of San Antonio before Hendrick closed the season with a series of problems. However, problems at Jaguar helped Chevrolet secure second in the manufacturers championship, once again losing to Porsche.

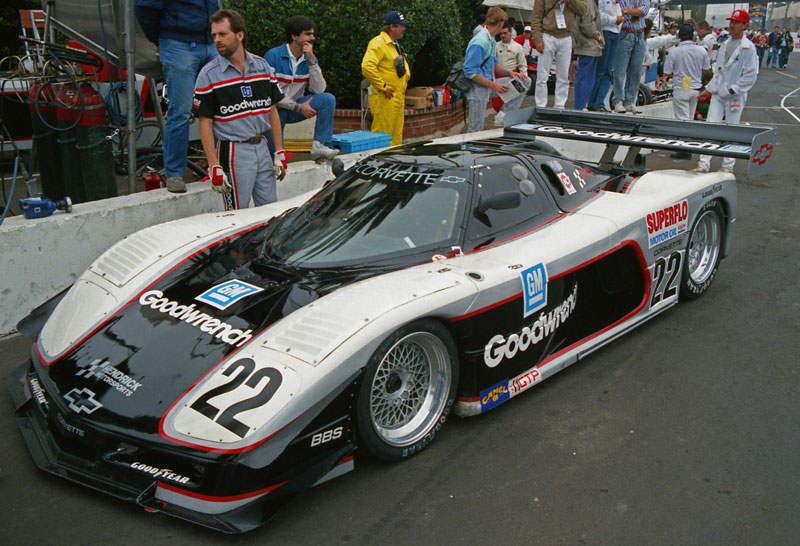
Bobby Rahal's Hendrick Motorsports Corvette GTP at Del Mar in 1988

By 1988, the Corvette GTPs were becoming more consistent as the team managed to overcome their mechanical woes, helped by the use of the naturally aspirated V8s. The season again began with an eighth-place finish at Road Atlanta be the first finish by a Corvette GTP that season. A seventh at Lime Rock and Mid-Ohio was followed by a third at Watkins Glen, tenth at Road America, and finally ninth at Sears Point. It was late in the season before the two Hendrick cars were joined by the new Peerless Racing squad, using the newest Corvette GTP chassis. Peerless took fourth place at Columbus, followed closely behind by Hendrick in fifth. Hendrick closed the season with a fifth at Del Mar. Chevrolet however finished fourth in championship. The Peerless Team had such notable drivers as David Hobbs, Jack Baldwin, Jacque Villeneuve & Scott Goodyear.

After the 1988 season, General Motors chose to cancel their funding for the Corvette GTP project, and Hendrick Motorsport did not return to IMSA GT. Peerless Racing intended to continue through the 1989 season eventually finishing only one race, in 4th place at Watkins Glen. The Peerless car then was used by Eagle Performance which outfitted the chassis with their enormous 10.2-liter (4-cam, 32-valve) V8 Big Block Chevrolet engine unit, experimenting with this new setup Eagle intended to enter the car in the 24 Hours of Le Mans which was not successful as the car did not qualify in the night qualifying session due to an electrical problem, thus marking the end of the Corvette GTP.

== Chassis ==
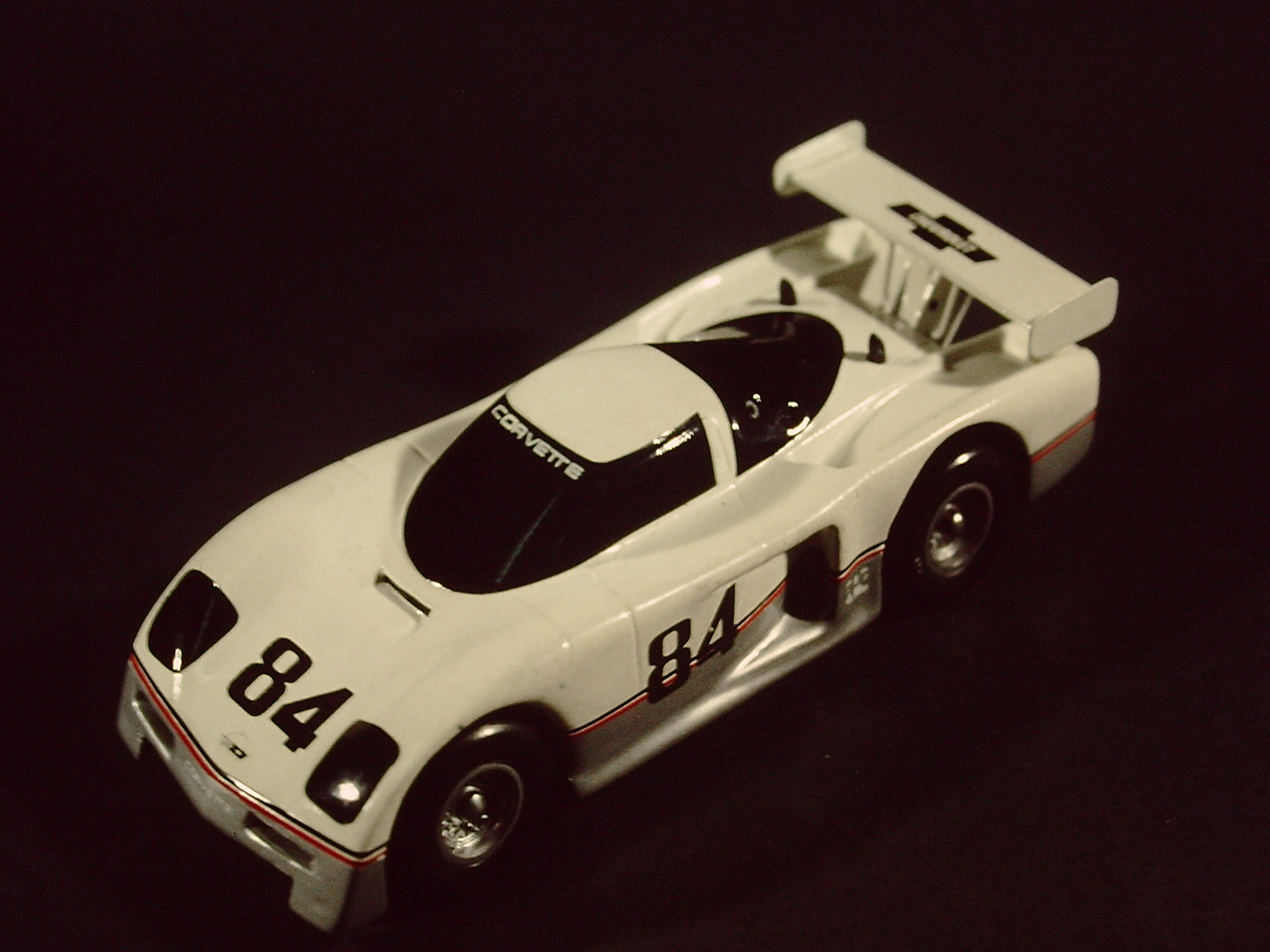
Pinewood derby car modeled after the IMSA GTP Corvette

In total, seven cars were built under the Corvette GTP program. Each chassis has a different designation and number, the '10' in the chassis number indicates a car designed for GM's turbocharged V6, while '11' indicates a V8-powered chassis design, only two of the seven were designed for V-8 engines. Although, during 1986–87, GM did install 366 CID V8 engines in two of the V6 chassis.

T710-HU01

- Hendrick Motorsport (1985–1986)

Winner at Road Atlanta (1986)

T711-HU02

- Lee Racing (1985–1986)

T86/10-HU01

- Hendrick Motorsport (1986–1987)

Winner at Palm Beach (1986)

T86/10-HU02

- Hendrick Motorsport (1986–1988)

T86/12-HU03

- Hendrick Motorsport (1987)

Equipped with Lotus active suspension

T87/10-HU01

- Hendrick Motorsport (1988)

T88/11-HU01

- Peerless Racing (1988–1989)
- Eagle Performance (1990)
- Leicester Motorsport (1994–2019)

== See also ==
- Corvette Daytona Prototype
