= Jerry Palmer =

Automotive designer

- Born: October 22, 1942; Detroit, Michigan
- Died: October 24, 2026 (aged 84); Traverse City, Michigan
- Occupation: Designer
- Known for: Automotive Design
- Label(s): 1982 Chevrolet Camaro, 1984 Chevrolet Corvette

Jerry Palmer (October 22, 1942 - October 24, 2026) was a retired automotive designer for General Motors from 1966 to 2002.

== Career ==
Palmer graduated from the College for Creative Studies in 1966, and immediately started working for General Motors' design studios. He was appointed chief designer at Chevrolet III Studio in 1974, later being promoted to GM's Advance Design division in 1986, director of the Thousand Oaks Advance Concept Centre in 1990, and finally executive director of design.

"Palmer retired in 2002 as the executive director of design for General Motors (GM) North American Operations. In this position, he oversaw the interior and exterior design of all of GM’s production vehicles."

He was a principal designer."Palmer was largely responsible for the design of the four rotor-Aerovette" which was "his design of the Fourth Generation Corvette". He "began working on the design and advanced aerodynamics that became the 1984 Corvette."

"Jerry Palmer was the chief stylist for the third-generation Camaro."

In 2000, he was inducted into the Corvette Hall of Fame.

== Designs ==
- 1977 Chevrolet Aerovette Concept
- 1978 Chevrolet Camaro Z28 facelift
- 1978 Chevrolet Corvette (C3) facelift
- 1980 Chevrolet Corvette (C3) facelift
- 1982 Chevrolet Camaro & Pontiac Firebird
- 1984 Chevrolet Corvette (C4)
- 1987 Chevrolet Beretta
- 1990 CERV III
