= Dave McLellan =

American automotive engineer

Dave McLellan (born in Munising, Michigan) is a former automotive engineer for General Motors, most notably the chief engineer for the Corvette from 1975 until his retirement in 1992.

McLellan joined General Motors in 1959 following his graduation from Wayne State University. He briefly worked alongside Corvette chief engineer Zora Arkus-Duntov before succeeding him upon Arkus-Duntov's retirement. McLellan was responsible for overseeing the engineering of the C4 Corvette, as well as initiating the 1997 C5 design which was later completed by his successor, Dave Hill.

McLellan has two sons and was married to Glenda McLellan until her death in 2016.

McLellan is the author of Corvette from the Inside: The 50 Year Development History as Told by Dave McLellan, a firsthand account of the development of the Chevrolet Corvette during his tenure as the car's chief engineer.
