= Dave Hill (automotive engineer) =

Chief Engineer for the 5th and 6th generations of the Chevrolet Corvette

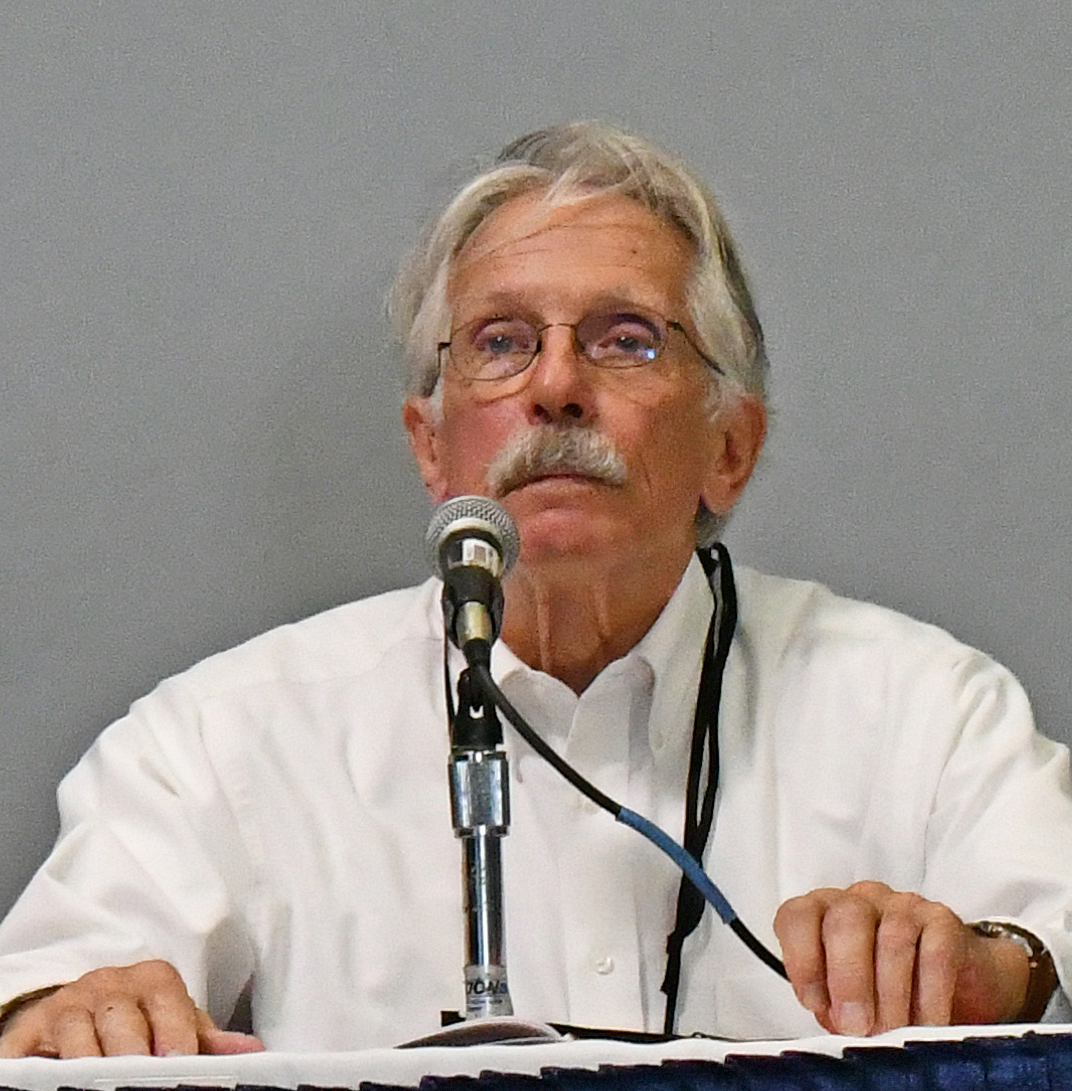
Dave Hill at the NCRS National Convention 2022

David C. Hill (born January 15, 1943) is a former automotive engineer for General Motors. He is best known as the Chief Engineer for the 5th (C5) and 6th (C6) generations of the Chevrolet Corvette.

He graduated from Michigan Tech and from the University of Michigan (M.A., Mechanical Engineering 1970), and began his career at GM in engine engineering for Cadillac in 1965, and moved into engineering management assignments for Cadillac in the mid-1970s, rising to the position of Engineering Program Manager in early 1992. He officially became the third Chief Engineer for the Corvette on November 18, 1992. He retired on January 1, 2006, and was succeeded as Corvette Chief Engineer by Tadge Juechter.
