= List of Chevrolet vehicles =

Chevrolet is a division of the manufacturer General Motors (GM), which produces vehicles since 1911 worldwide.

== Current production vehicles ==
Vehicles currently not sold in the United States and Canada

Body style	Model			Current generation			Vehicle description
Body style	Image	Name(s)	Introduction (cal. year)	Introduction (cal. year)	Update	Main markets	Vehicle description
Crossover SUV		Blazer	2018	2018	2022	North America and China	Mid-size crossover mainly marketed in North America (two-row), and China (three-row).
Crossover SUV		Blazer EV	2023	2023	—	North America	Battery-electric mid-size crossover using the Blazer nameplate.
Crossover SUV		Bolt	2016	2022 (As Bolt EUV)	2025	U.S., Canada, and Chile.	Battery-electric subcompact crossover SUV, previously sold as a hatchback and successor of Bolt EUV.
Crossover SUV		Captiva	2006	2019	2023	Latin America, Middle East and Philippines	Compact crossover developed and manufactured by SAIC-GM-Wuling. Two-row and three-row options are available. Rebadged Baojun 530, also called the Wuling Almaz and MG Hector.
Crossover SUV		Captiva PHEV/EV	2025	2025	—	Latin America, Middle East and Philippines	Compact crossover developed and manufactured by SAIC-GM-Wuling. Rebadged Wuling Starlight S.
Crossover SUV		Equinox	2004	2024	—	North America and China	Compact crossover (mid-size until 2017).
Crossover SUV		Equinox EV	2023	2023	—	North America	Battery-electric compact crossover using the Equinox nameplate.
Crossover SUV		Groove	2020	2025	—	Latin America, Middle East and Philippines	Subcompact crossover developed and manufactured by SAIC-GM-Wuling. The first generation rebadges Baojun 510 and the second generation rebadges Wuling Xingchi.
Crossover SUV		Sonic	2026	2026	—	Latin America	Subcompact crossover based on the GEM platform produced in Brazil, Latin Americ.
Crossover SUV		Spark EUV	2025	2025	—	Latin America, Middle East and Philippines	Crossover mini SUV developed and manufactured by SAIC-GM-Wuling. Rebadged Baojun Yep Plus.
Crossover SUV		Tracker	2020	2020	2025	Latin America	Subcompact crossover based on the GEM platform produced in Brazil and China and it is currently sold in China, Latin America and the Philippines.
Crossover SUV		Trailblazer (crossover)	2019	2019	2024	North America and South Korea	Subcompact/compact crossover produced by GM Korea for the South Korean and North American market.
Crossover SUV		Traverse	2008	2023	—	North America, South Korea, China, Middle East	Full-size crossover mainly marketed in North America and select export markets.
Crossover SUV		Trax	2013	2022	—	North America and South Korea	Compact crossover, replacing the first-generation Trax which is a subcompact crossover.
Body-on- frame SUV		Suburban	1935	2020	2024	North America and Middle East	Full-size body-on-frame SUV. An extended-length version of the Tahoe. Closely related to the GMC Yukon XL and Cadillac Escalade ESV. The longest continuously used automobile nameplate in production.
Body-on- frame SUV		Tahoe	1995	2020	2024	North America, Middle East and China	Full-size body-on-frame SUV. Closely related to the GMC Yukon and Cadillac Escalade.
Body-on- frame SUV		Trailblazer (SUV)	2001	2012	2024	Latin America	Mid-size body-on-frame SUV based on the Colorado produced in Brazil. Previously also produced in Thailand and also sold in Australasia as the Holden Colorado 7 and Holden Trailblazer.
Pickup truck		Colorado/ S10	2004	2011	2024	Latin America	Second-generation mid-size pickup truck jointly developed with Isuzu and related to the Isuzu D-Max. Sold as the Chevrolet S-10 in Mercosur. Previously was also sold in Southeast Asia and Australasia.
Pickup truck		Colorado	2003	2022	—	North America	Third-generation mid-size pickup truck.
Pickup truck		Montana	2003	2023	—	Latin America	Four-door compact pickup marketed in Latin America.
Pickup truck		S10 Max / D-Max	2021	2021	—	Latin America and Egypt	Rebadged Maxus T70 marketed in Egypt and select Latin American markets such as Mexico and Ecuador.
Pickup truck		Silverado/ Cheyenne	1998	2018	2022	North America and Middle East	Full-size pickup truck mainly marketed in North America, successor to the Chevrolet C/K. Offered as a series of full-size pickup trucks, chassis cab trucks, and medium-duty trucks. Closely related to the GMC Sierra.
Pickup truck		Silverado EV	2023	2023	—	North America	Battery-electric full-size pickup truck using the Silverado nameplate.
Heavy-duty pickup truck		Silverado HD	2000	2020	2024	U.S. and Canada	Heavy-duty version of the Chevrolet Silverado.
Sports car		Corvette	1953	2020	—	Global	Mid-engined sports car (front-engine until 2019). Available in coupe and convertible body styles.
Sedan		Monza/Cruze	2019	2019	2023	China and Middle East (except UAE)	Compact sedan developed and manufactured by SAIC-GM for the Chinese market. Successor to the Cruze. Also known as the Cavalier in Mexico as the successor to the 2016–2021 Cavalier.
Sedan		Onix Plus	2012	2019	2025	Latin America	Subcompact sedan developed by GM Brasil and SAIC-GM for the Latin America and China based on the GEM platform. Sedan version of the Onix. Successor of the Prisma.
Sedan		Sail/Aveo/Optra	2002	2023	—	Latin America and Egypt	Subcompact sedan developed by SAIC-GM-Wuling.
Hatchback		Onix	2012	2019	2025	Latin America	Subcompact hatchback developed by GM Brasil and SAIC-GM for Latin America and China based on the GEM platform.
Hatchback		Sail/Aveo/Optra	2002	2023	—	Latin America	Subcompact hatchback developed by SAIC-GM-Wuling.
MPV/ minivan		Spin	2012	2012	2025	South America	Two-row or three-row mini MPV for the South American market, previously also produced and marketed in Southeast Asia.
Van		Express	1995	1995	2003	North America	Full-size van sold in North America.
Van		Express Max	2025	2025	—	Mexico	Mid-size van. Rebadged Maxus V70 marketed in Mexico.
Van		N300	2008	2008	—	Latin America	Small cabover van developed and manufactured by SAIC-GM-Wuling. Rebadged Wuling Rongguang.
Van		N400/Tornado Van/Damas	2019	2019	—	Latin America, Mexico and Uzbekistan	Small van developed and manufactured by SAIC-GM-Wuling. Rebadged Wuling Hongguang V.
Heavy commercial vehicle		F-Series	N/A	N/A	N/A	Americas	Commercial medium-duty truck developed by Isuzu. Also called "Low Cab Forward 6500XD" in North America. Rebadged Isuzu Forward.
Heavy commercial vehicle		N-Series	N/A	N/A	N/A	Americas and Egypt	Commercial medium-duty truck developed by Isuzu. Also called "Low Cab Forward" in North America. Rebadged Isuzu Elf.
Heavy commercial vehicle		Silverado (medium duty) (Note: 4500HD-6500HD.)	2018	2018	–	U.S. and Canada	Medium-duty version of the Silverado that replaces the Chevrolet Kodiak.

=== Currently produced under license ===
- Chevrolet Cobalt (Uzbekistan)
- Chevrolet T-Series (Egypt)

== Former production vehicles ==
=== United States ===
Models originally designed and manufactured in the United States (rebadged models are included in another separate list):

Image	Model	Intr.	Disc.	Platforms	Gen.	Description
	Series C Classic Six	1911	1914		1	The first automobile produced by Chevrolet
	Light Six	1914	1915		1	Full-sized car produced by Chevrolet
	Series H	1914	1916		1	One of the first automobiles made by Chevrolet under W.C. Durant, GM's founder to compete against Ford Model T
	Series 490	1915	1922		1	Chevrolet's successful mid-sized car
	Series F	1917	1917		1	Replaced the Series H
	Series D	1917	1918		1	The first V8 Chevrolet
	Series FA	1917	1918		1	Chevrolet's full-sized car
	Series FB	1919	1922	GM A	1	Chevrolet's full-sized car
	Superior	1923	1926	GM A	1	Chevrolet's car based on A platform
	Series M Copper-Cooled	1923	1923	GM A	1	Chevrolet's car based on Superior with air cooling system
	Series AA Capitol	1927	1927	GM A	1	Chevrolet's mid sized car that competed against the Ford Model A
	Series AB National	1928	1928	GM A	1	Chevrolet's mid sized car that replaced Series AA Capitol
	Series AC International	1929	1929	GM A	1	Chevrolet's mid sized car that replaced Series AB National
	Series AD Universal	1930	1930	GM A	1	Chevrolet's mid sized car that replaced Series AC International
	Series AE Independence	1931	1931	GM A	1	Chevrolet's mid sized car that replaced Series AD Universal
	Series BA Confederate	1932	1932	GM A	1	Chevrolet's mid sized car that replaced Series AE Independence
	CA Eagle/Master	1933	1933	GM A	1	Chevrolet's mid sized car that replaced Series BA Confederate
	Standard Six	1933	1936	GM A	1	Chevrolet's mid sized car that was offered as a lower priced alternative to the Series BA Confederate
	Master	1933	1942	GM A	1	Chevrolet's mid sized car that replaced Series CA Master
	AK	1941	1947	GM A	1	Light-duty pickup truck sold in conventional or COE configurations
	Deluxe	1941	1952	GM A	1	Passenger car sold as a coupe, convertible, sedan, and station wagon
	Fleetmaster	1946	1948	GM A	1	Passenger car sold as a coupe, convertible, sedan, and station wagon
	Stylemaster	1946	1948	GM A	1	Passenger car sold as a coupe, sedan, sedan delivery, and coupe utility
	Advance Design	1947	1955	GM A	1	Chevy's first major redesign after World War II, as a bigger, stronger, and sleeker design compared to AK Series
	Bel Air	1950	1981	GM A GM B	7 (Note: Only in the US. In Canada, it had 8 generations.)	Chevy's mid-level full-size car for the 1950–1975 in US market and 1950–1981 for Canadian market
	150	1953	1957	GM A	1	Fleet/economy version of the Bel Air
	210	1953	1957	GM A	1	Midrange car, placed between the 150 and Bel Air
	Townsman	1953	1972	GM B	2	Bel Air-based mid level full-size wagon. The first generation was produced 1953–1957, and the second generation was produced 1969–1972
	Nomad	1955	1972	A-body; GM B GM A (RWD)	3	Chevrolet's mid-size station wagon
	Task Force	1955	1959	GM A	1	Replacement for the Advance design, the new design included "wrap-around" windshield, power steering and brakes and 12V electrical system
	Biscayne	1958	1975	GM B	4	Chevy's least expensive level full-size car for the 1950–1972 in US market and 1950–1975 for Canadian market
	Brookwood	1958	1972	GM B	2	Biscayne-based least expensive level full-size wagon. The first generation was produced 1958–1961, and the second generation was produced 1969–1972
	Impala	1958	2020	Epsilon II	10	Chevrolet's full-size car
	El Camino	1959	1987	GM B A-Body; G-Body	5	Coupé utility/pickup vehicle that was introduced in the 1959 model year in response to the success of the Ranchero pickup
	Kingswood	1959	1972	GM B	2	Impala-based top level full-size wagon. The first generation was produced 1959–1960, and the second generation was produced 1969–1972
	C/K	1960	2002	GM C/KGMT400	3	Chevrolet's long run of full-sized pickup trucks offered in light-duty or heavy-duty configurations with rear-wheel or four-wheel-drive application
	Corvair	1960	1969	GM Z	2	Chevrolet's compact car
	Corvair 95	1961	1965	GM Z	1	Chevrolet's van and truck models based on the Corvair
	Chevy II / Nova	1962	1988	X-body	5	Chevrolet's compact (1962–1979) and subcompact (1985–1988) car. Nova was the top-line of Chevy II series
	Chevelle	1964	1977	GM A	3	Chevrolet's successful mid-size car produced during 1964–1977
	Chevy Van	1964	1995		3	Chevrolet's long run van line-up
	Caprice	1965	1996	GM B	4	Chevrolet's most popular full-size car produced during 1965–1996
	Camaro	1966	2023	Alpha	6	Pony/muscle car. Available in coupe and convertible body styles.
	K5 Blazer	1969	1994		3	Chevrolet's smallest full-size SUV version of the Chevrolet C/K family
	Kingswood Estate	1969	1972	GM B	1	Caprice-based top level full-size wagon, added at the range higher than Kingswood, produced during 1969–1972
	Monte Carlo	1969	2007	GM G	6	Chevy's personal luxury coupe produced during 1969–1987 and 1994–2007
	Vega	1971	1977	GM H (RWD)	1	Chevrolet's subcompact car
	LUV	1972	1988		2	Chevrolet's light pickup truck developed and built by Isuzu; rebadged Isuzu Faster
	Chevelle Laguna	1973	1976	GM A	1	The top-line Chevelle series produced during 1972–1976
	Chevette	1975	1987	T-body	1	Chevrolet's FR layout subcompact car
	Monza	1975	1980	H-Body	1	Chevrolet's subcompact car
	Malibu	1978 (Note: Separate nameplate from Chevelle, reintroduced 1996)	2025	Epsilon II	9	Chevrolet's final sedan sold in North America.
	Citation	1979	1985	X-body	1	Chevrolet's compact car that superseded Chevy Nova
	Kodiak	1980	2009	GMT530; GMT560	3	Chevrolet's last medium-duty Truck produced until 2009
	Celebrity	1981	1990	A-body	1	Chevrolet's successful mid sized car
	Cavalier	1981	2005	GM J	3	Chevrolet's compact car replacing Chevy Monza
	S-10	1982	2004	GMT325	2	Chevrolet's compact pickup truck which was the first domestically built compact pickup of the "Big Three" American automakers
	Astro	1985	2005	M-van	2	Chevrolet's rear-wheel drive mid-sized van
	Corsica	1987	1996	L-body	1	Chevrolet's front wheel drive compact car
	Beretta	1987	1996	L-body	1	Chevrolet's front wheel drive coupe based on the Chevy Corsica
	GMT400	1987	2000	GMT400	1	Chevrolet's full-sized pickup trucks offered in light-duty or heavy-duty configurations with rear-wheel or four-wheel drive applications using GTM400 Platform
	Lumina APV	1989	1996	U-body	1	Chevrolet's first minivan based on GM U-body
	Tracker	1989	2004	TA	2	Chevrolet's mini SUV developed and produced by CAMI, a joint venture between GM of Canada and Suzuki
	Lumina	1990	2001	GM W	2	Chevrolet's mid-size sedan replacing Celebrity and Monte Carlo
	Venture	1997	2005	GMT 200	1	Chevrolet's minivan which replaced Lumina APV
	Avalanche	2001	2013	GMT 805; GMT 900	2	Chevrolet's six passenger SUT sharing GM's long-wheelbase chassis used on the Chevrolet Suburban and Cadillac Escalade EXT
	SSR	2003	2006	GMT 368	1	Chevrolet's retractable hardtop convertible pickup truck based on the retro design concept
	Uplander	2004	2008	GMT 201	1	Chevrolet's last production minivan for North America
	HHR	2005	2011	GMT 001	1	Chevrolet's retro-style five-passenger station wagon based on front-wheel-drive Delta platform
	Cobalt	2005	2010	GM Delta	1	Chevrolet's compact sedan that replaced the Cavalier
	Cruze	2008	2023		2	Chevrolet's compact car based on D2XX platform. Developed by GM Korea.
	Volt	2010	2019		2	Chevrolet's compact plug-in hybrid car based on D2UX platform.
	Bolt EUV	2021	2023	BEV II	1	Chevrolet's Battery-electric subcompact crossover based on the Bolt EV.
	BrightDrop	2022	2025	Ultium	1	Battery-electric Van, Formerly BrightDrop Zevo.

=== Global ===
Chevrolet cars marketed and/or produced outside the United States:

Name	Region	Produced	Original model	Image
Cars
400 (Note: Produced locally by General Motors de Argentina.)	ARG	1962–1974	Chevrolet Chevy II	
El Torro	AUS	1968–1984	Holden Kingswood	
350 / Caprice / de Ville	AUS	1971–1984	Statesman	
1700	KOR	1972–1978	Holden Torana	
2500	IRN	1973–1978	Opel Rekord D	
3800 / 4100	IRN; ZAF	1972–1978	Opel Commodore	
Chevair	ZAF	1975–1981	Vauxhall Cavalier	
Rekord	ZAF	1978–1986	Opel Rekord E	
Senator	ZAF	1978–1982	Opel Senator	
Monza	SA	1981–1988	Opel Ascona	
Trooper	IDN	1981–1991	Isuzu Trooper	
Samurai (Note: Produced locally by GM Colmotores.)	COL	1981–2022	Suzuki Jimny	
Aska	CHI	1984–1989	Isuzu Aska	
Kadett / Ipanema	BRA	1984–1995	Opel Kadett	
Gemini / Spectrum	USA	1985–1990	Isuzu Gemini	
Sprint	USA; CAN	1985–2001	Suzuki Cultus	
Omega / Lumina	SA; PHL	1986–2004	Opel Omega	
Tracker	USA; SA	1988–2016	Suzuki Vitara	
Omega (Note: Produced locally by General Motors do Brasil.)	BRA	1992–2011	Chevrolet Omega/ Holden Calais	
Combo	CHI	1993–2012	Opel Combo	
Corsa / Classic	SA	1993–2016	Opel Corsa	
Vectra	BRA	1993–2005	Opel Vectra	
Astra	BRA	1994–2011	Opel Astra	
Tigra	BRA; MEX	1994–2000	Opel Tigra	
Nexia (Note: Produced locally by GM Uzbekistan.)	UZB	1996–2016	Daewoo LeMans	
Metro	USA	1998–2001	Geo Metro	
Prizm	USA	1998–2002	Geo Prizm	
Alto	COL	1999–2003	Suzuki Alto	
Alero	EU; ISR	1999–2001	Oldsmobile Alero	
Wagon R+ / MW	COL; JPN	1999–2010	Suzuki Solio	
Nabira	PHL	2000–2014	Opel Zafira	
Epica / Evanda	CAN	2000–2006	Daewoo Magnus	
Vivant	ZAF; SA	2000–2011	Daewoo Tacuma	
Cruze	JPN	2001–2008	Suzuki Ignis	
Tavera	IND; IDN	2001–2017	Isuzu Panther	
Aveo / Sonic; Kalos / Lova	KOR	2002–2020	Chevrolet Aveo	
Estate / Lacetti / Nubira / Optra	EU	2002–2009	Daewoo Lacetti	
Forester	IND	2002–2008	Subaru Forester	
D-Max	ECU	2002–2025	Isuzu D-Max	
Nexia	UZB	2003–2023	Chevrolet Aveo (T200)	
Niva	RUS	2003–2020	Lada Niva Travel	
Lacetti	UZB	2003–2024	Daewoo Lacetti	
Lanos	RUS; EGY	2005–2008	Daewoo Lanos	
Epica / Tosca	KOR; CHN	2006–2015	Daewoo Tosca	
Captiva Sport	USA	2006–2009	Opel Antara	
Agile	BRA	2009–2015	– (Note: Original model from General Motors do Brasil.)	
Damas / Labo	UZB	2008–2019	Daewoo Damas	
Orlando	KOR; CHN	2010–2023	—	
Spark (Note: Also named "Daewoo Matiz" in Korea.)	KOR	2010–2021	– (Note: Original model from General Motors Korea.)	
City Express	USA	2014–2018	Nissan NV200	
Enjoy	IND	2013–2017	Wuling Hongguang	
SS	USA	2013–2017	Holden Commodore (VF)	
Optra	EGY	2014–2023	Baojun 630	
Lova RV	CHN	2016–2019	–	
Joy (Note: Produced locally by GM Colmotores.)	COL	2019–2024	Chevrolet Onix	
Joy Plus	COL	2019–2024	Chevrolet Onix	
Menlo	CHN	2020–2026	—	

=== Other past vehicles ===
Name	Region	Produced	Original model	Image
Trucks
Bison	USA	1977–1987	GMC General	
Bruin	USA	1978–1989	GMC Brigadier	
Trafic	BRA	1980–2002	Renault Trafic	
CMV / Damas	CA; UZB	1985–2019	Suzuki Carry	
C/E-series	USA	1994–2016	Isuzu Giga	
Buses
B Series	USA	1966–2003	– (Note: Original model.)	

== Concept cars ==
Chevrolet concept cars

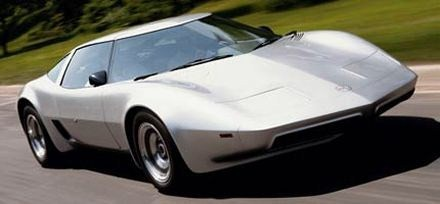
Aerovette (1977)

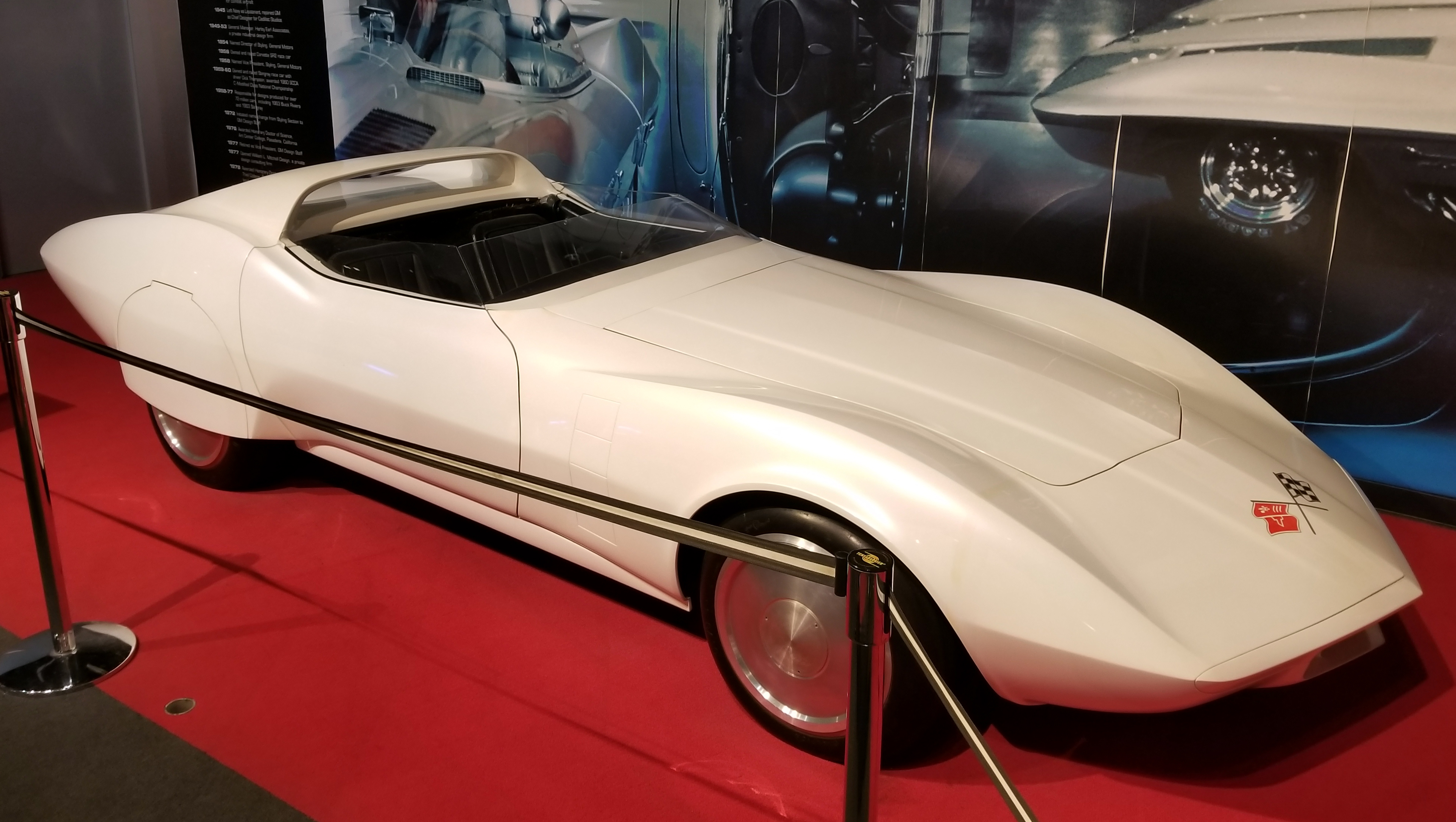
Astrovette (1968)

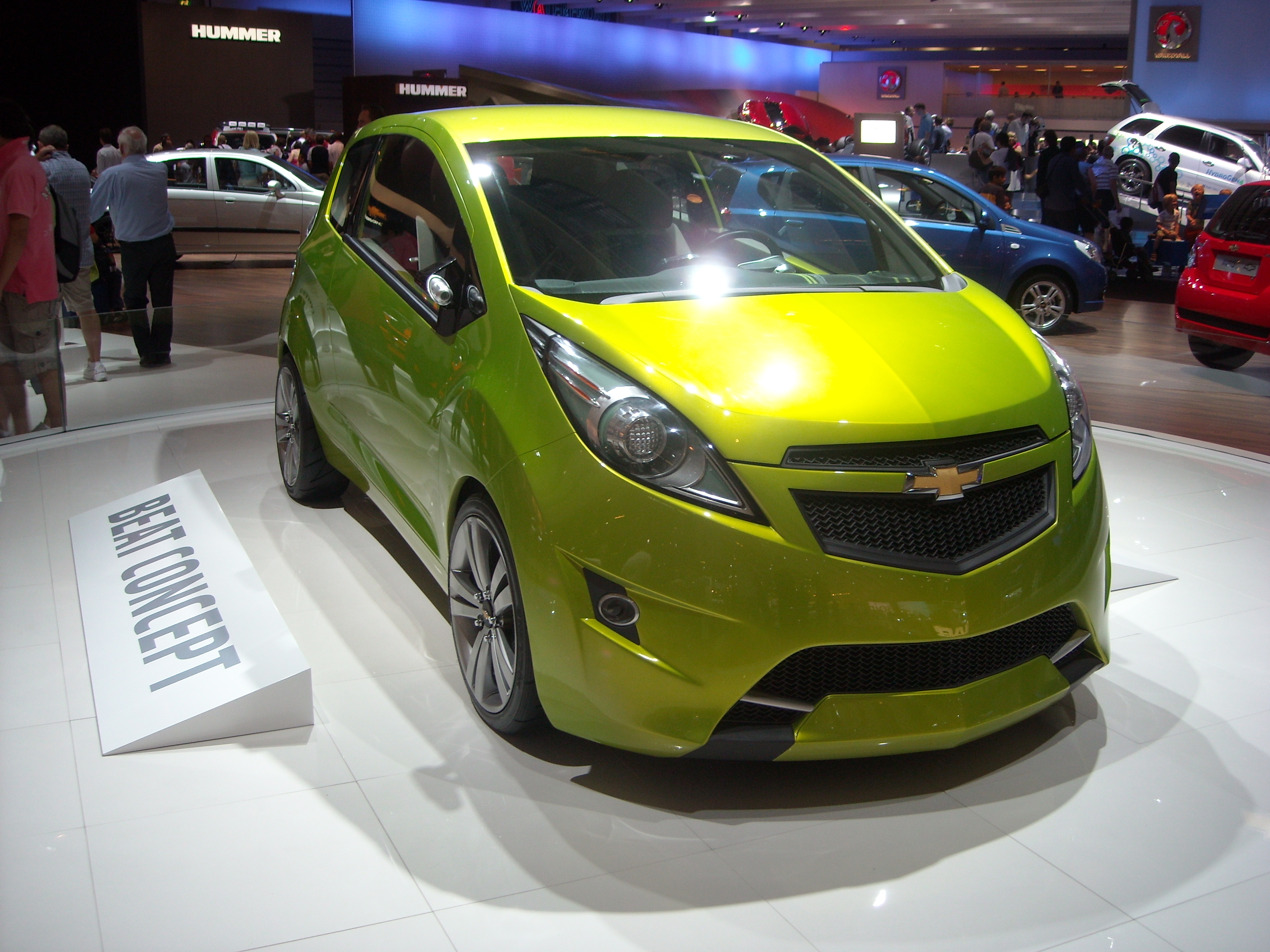
Beat (2008)

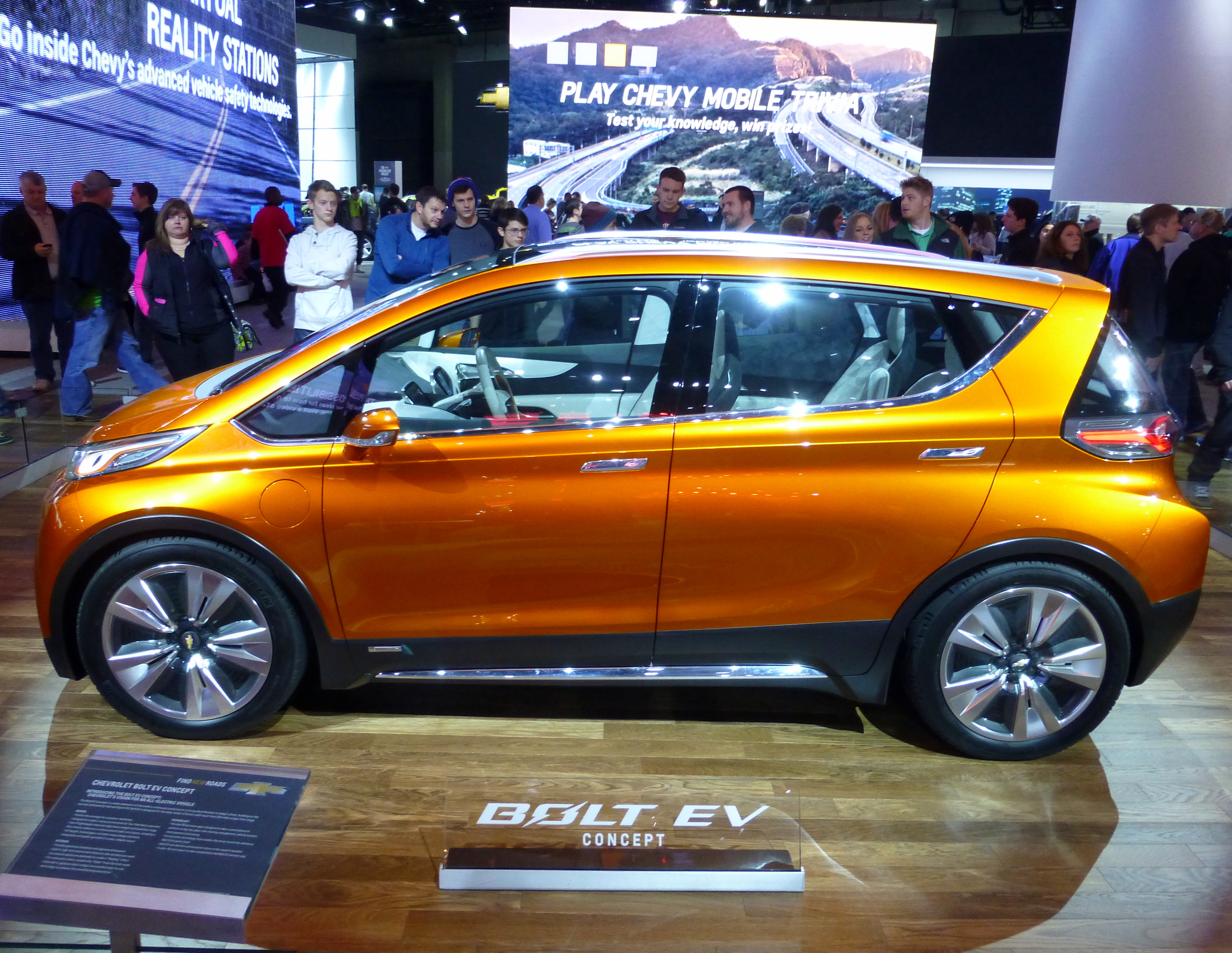
Bolt EV (2015)

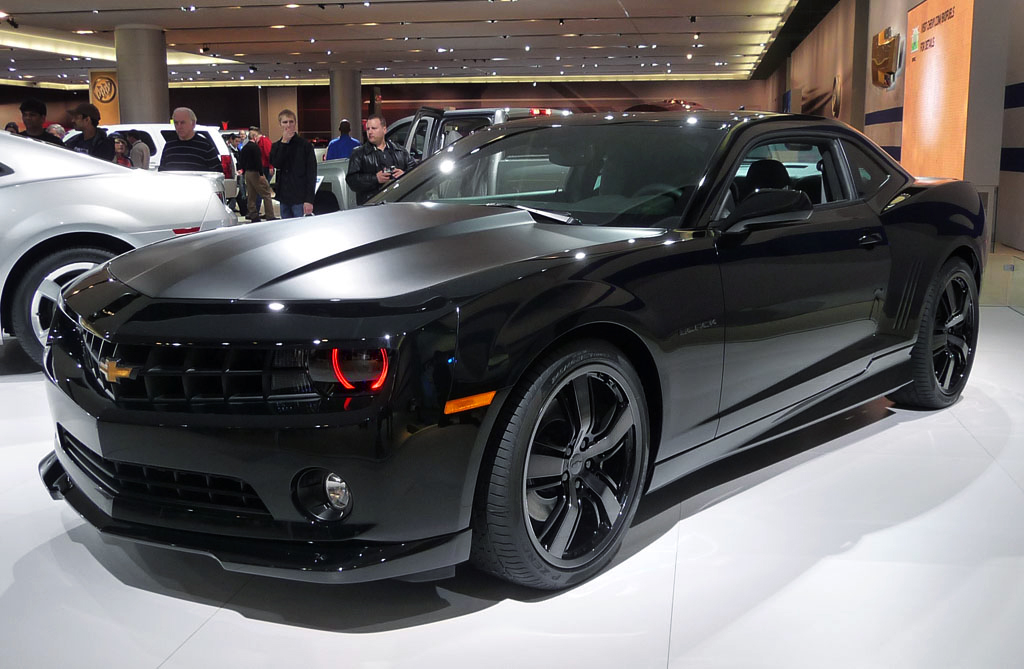
Camaro Black (2009)

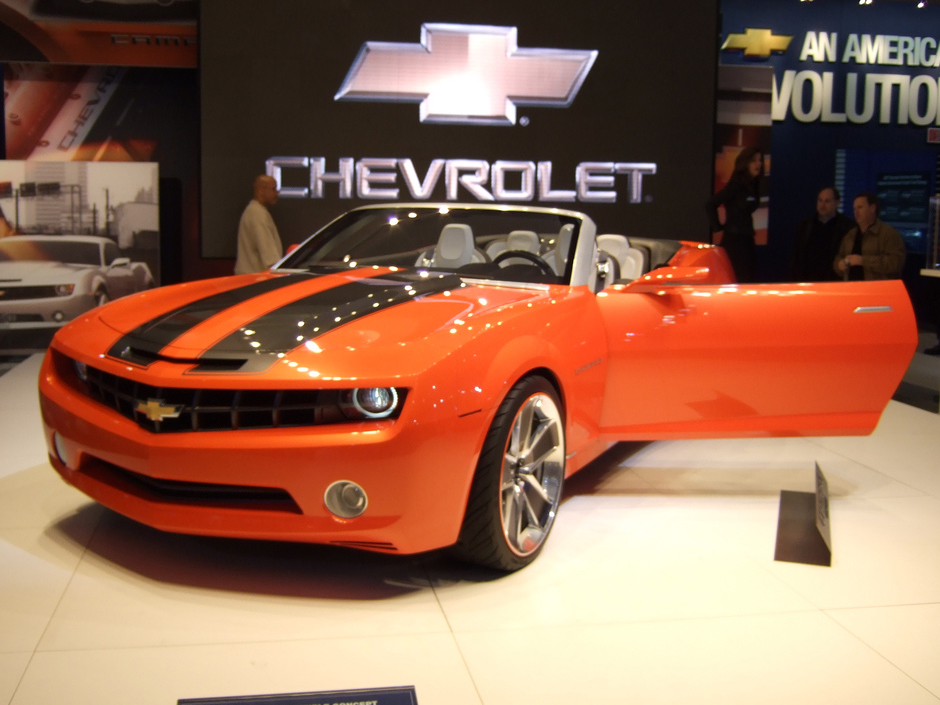
Camaro Convertible (2007)

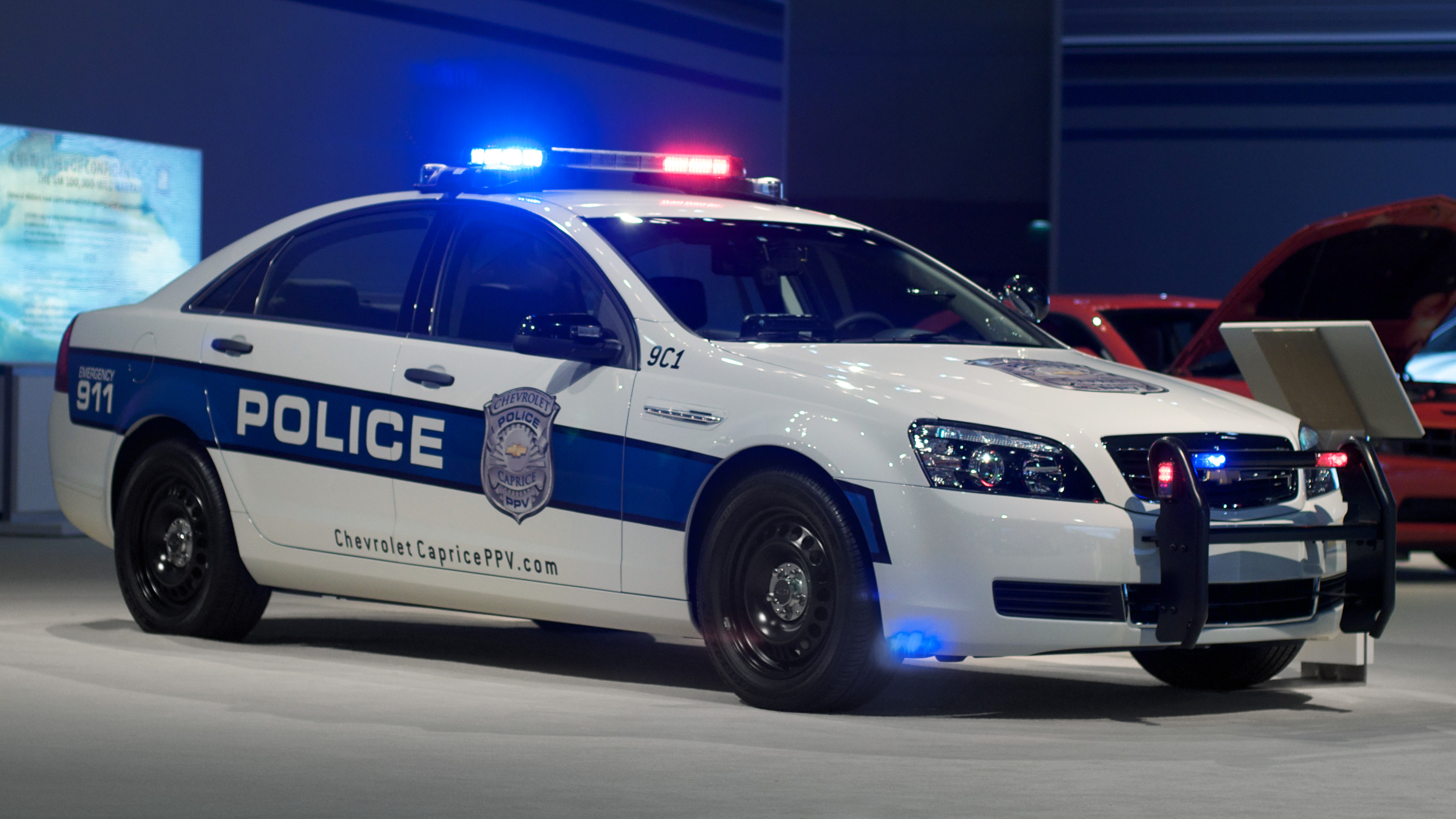
Caprice PPV (2009)

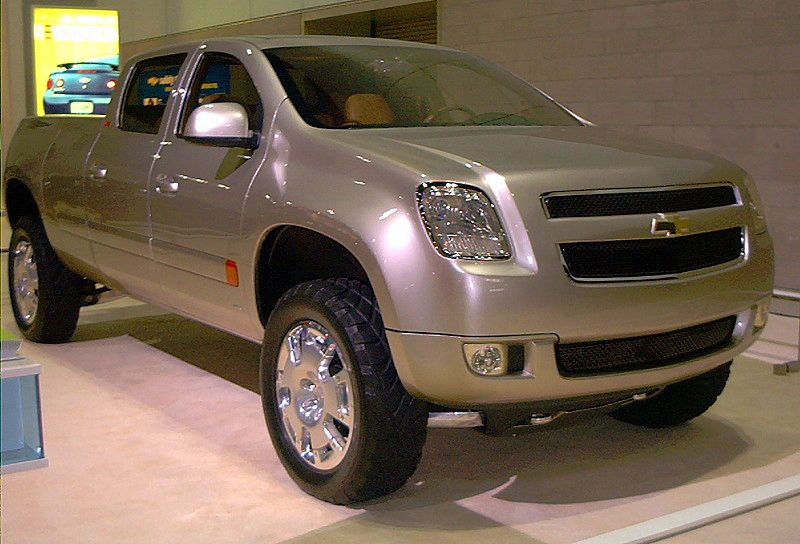
Cheyenne (2000)

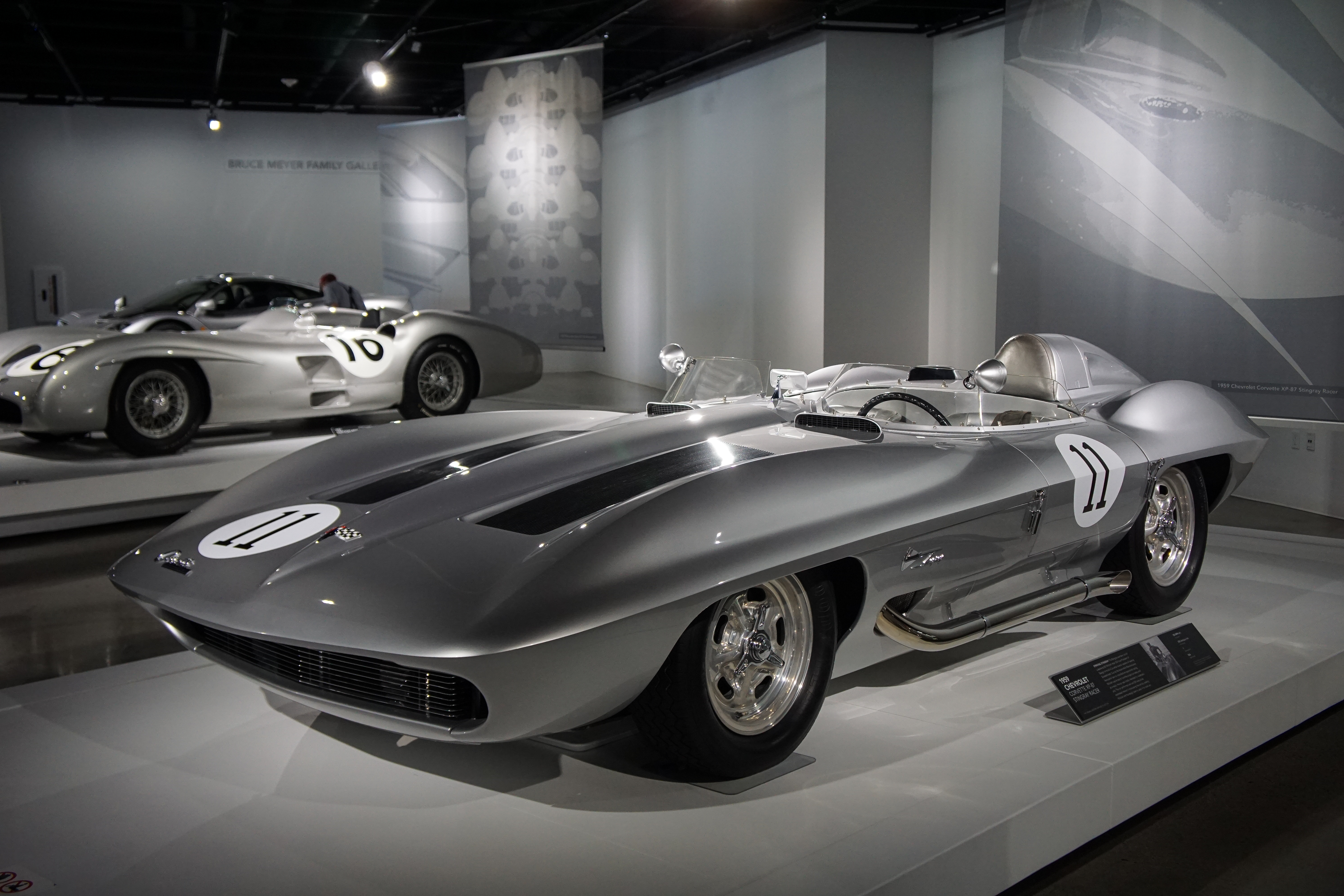
Corvette Stingray (1959)

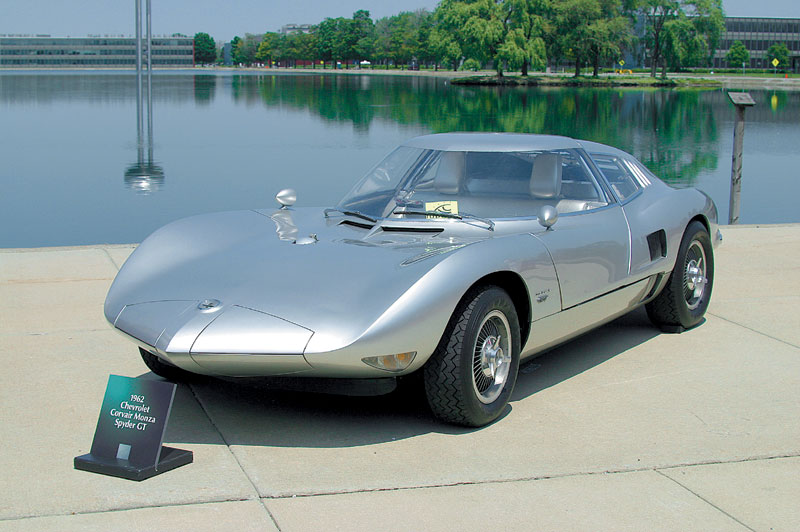
Corvair Monza GT (1962)

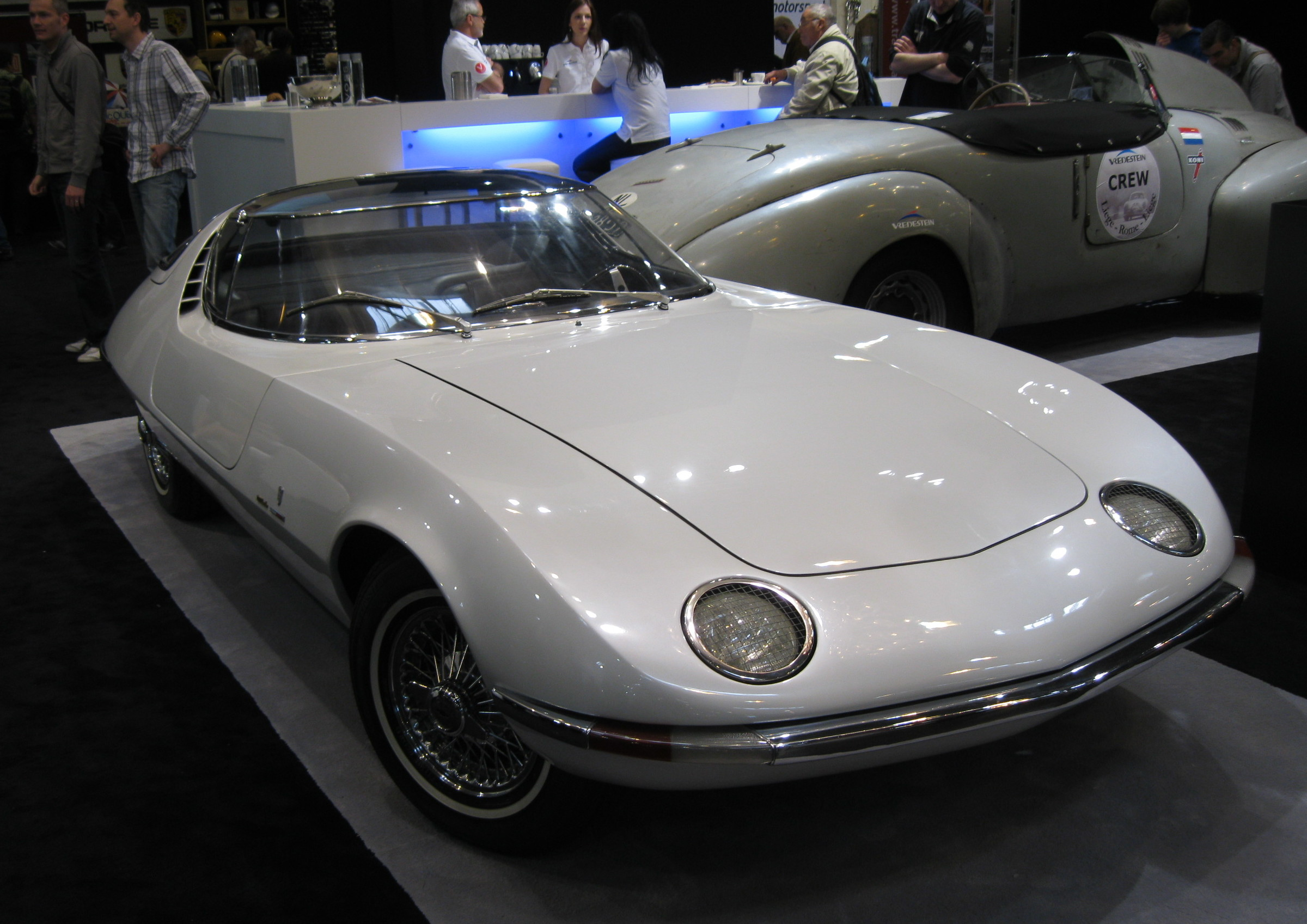
Testudo (1963)

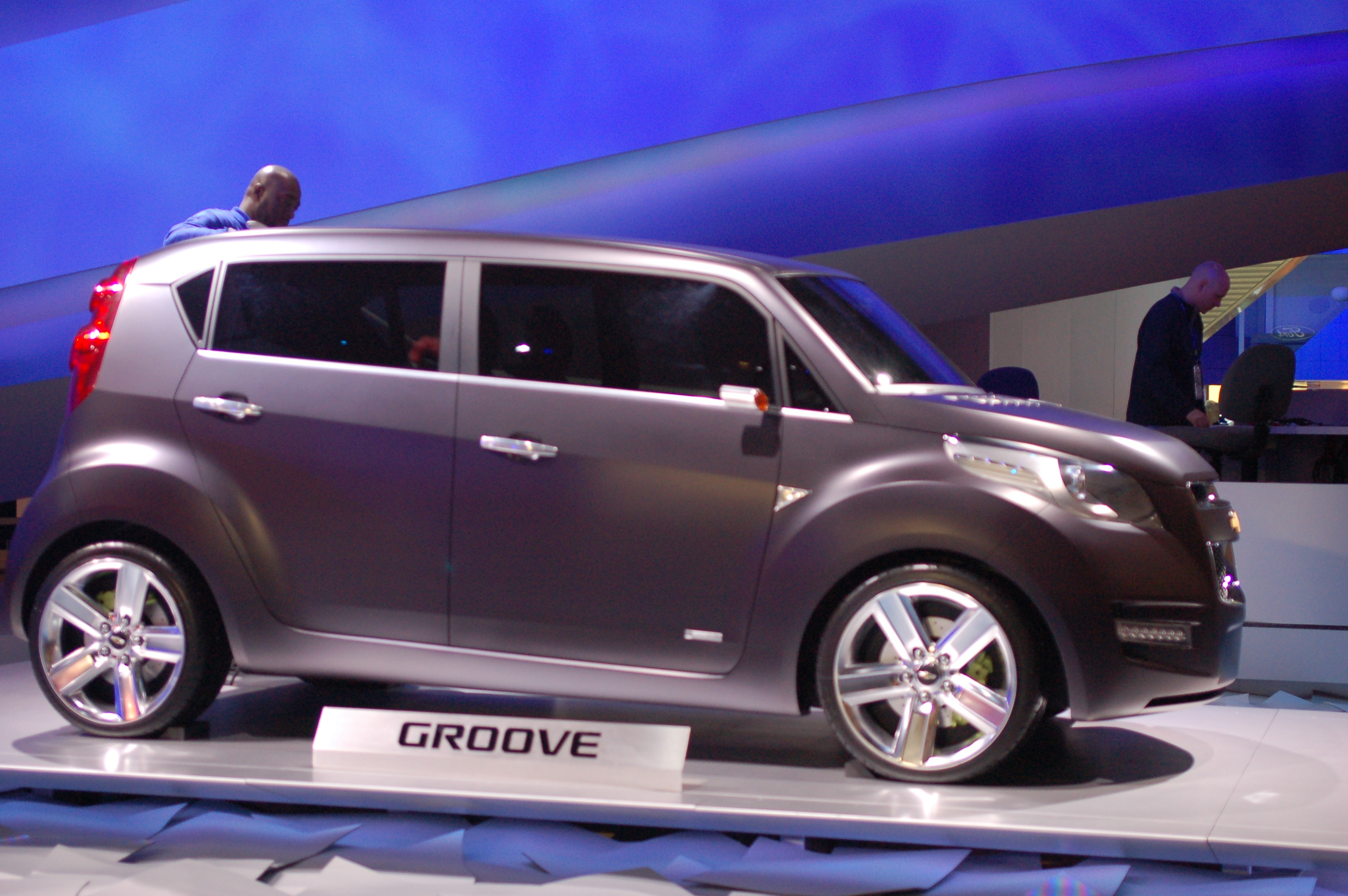
Groove (2007)

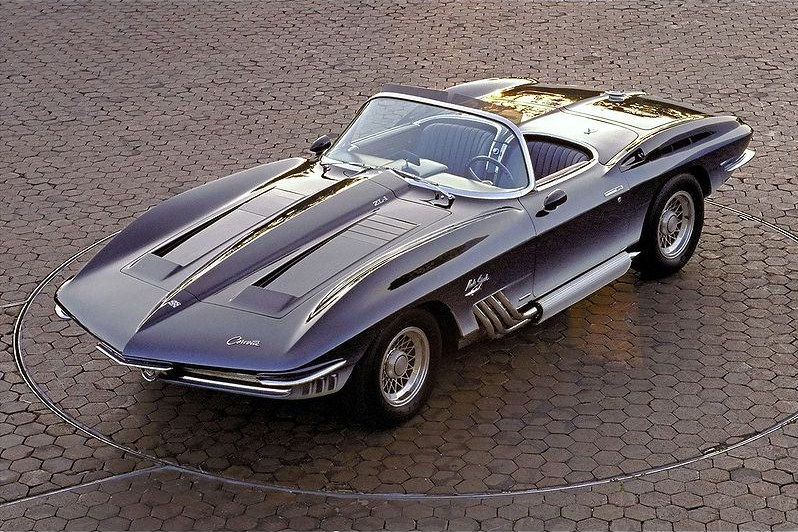
Mako Shark (1961)

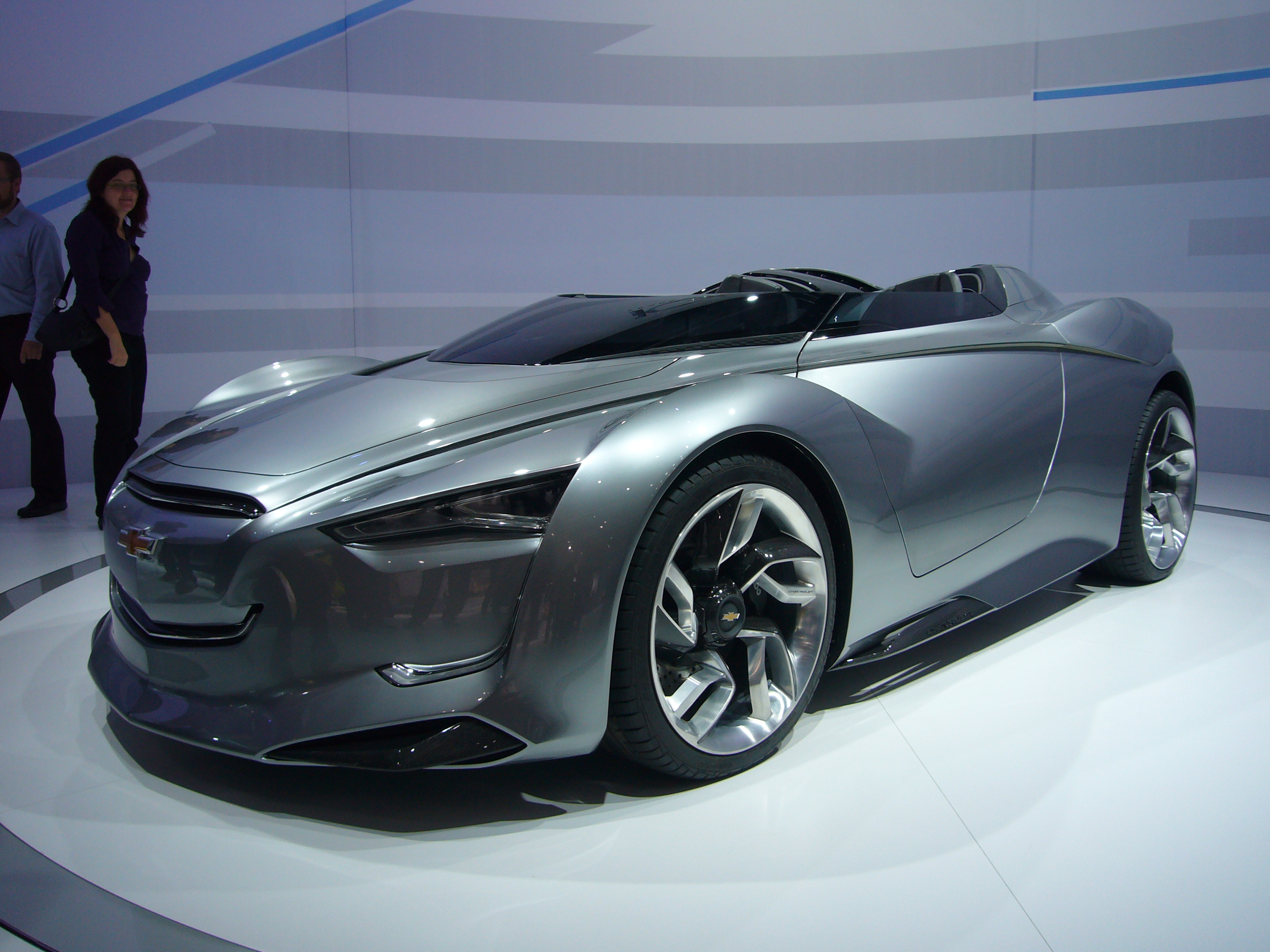
Miray (2012)

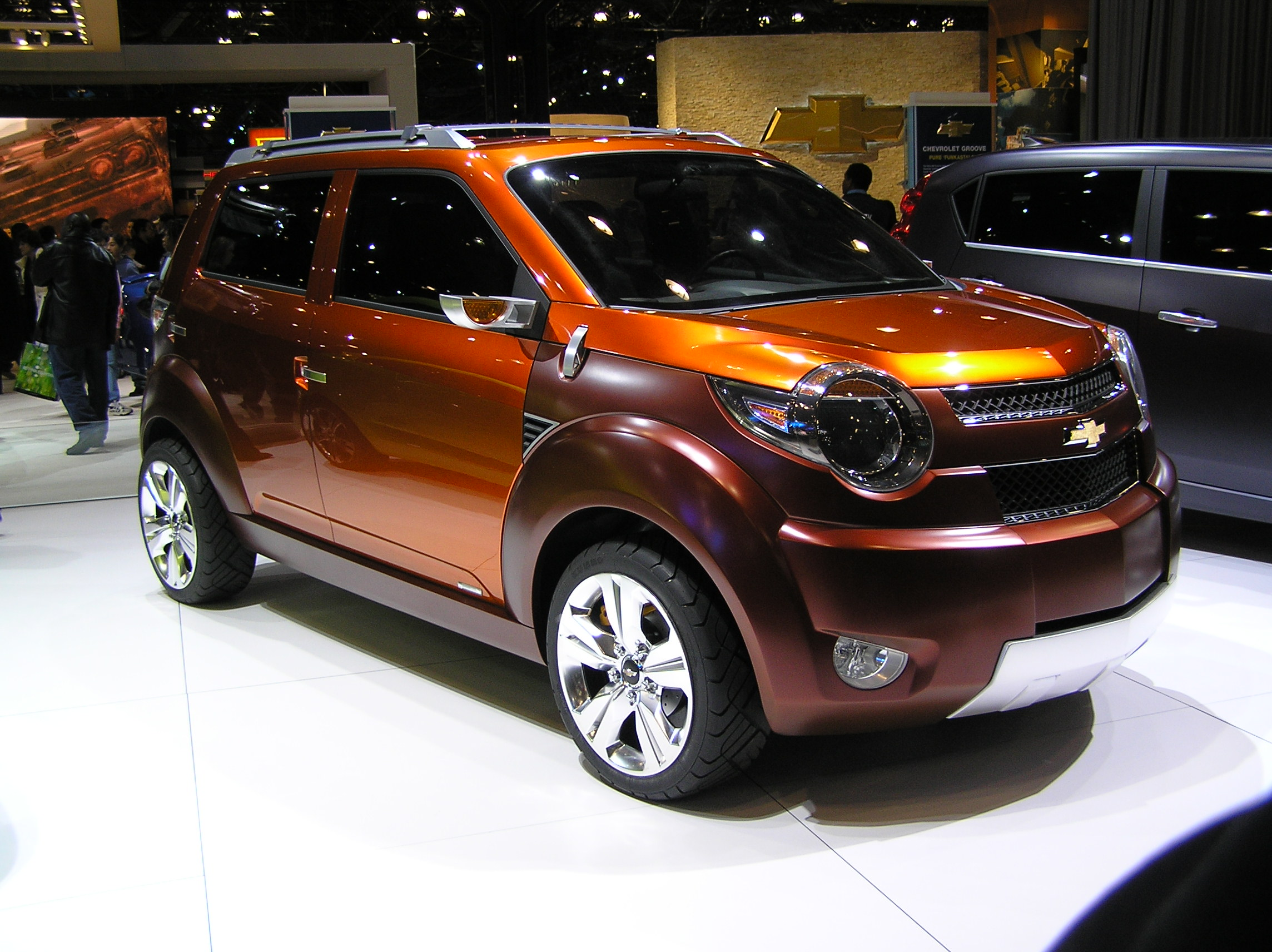
Trax (2007)

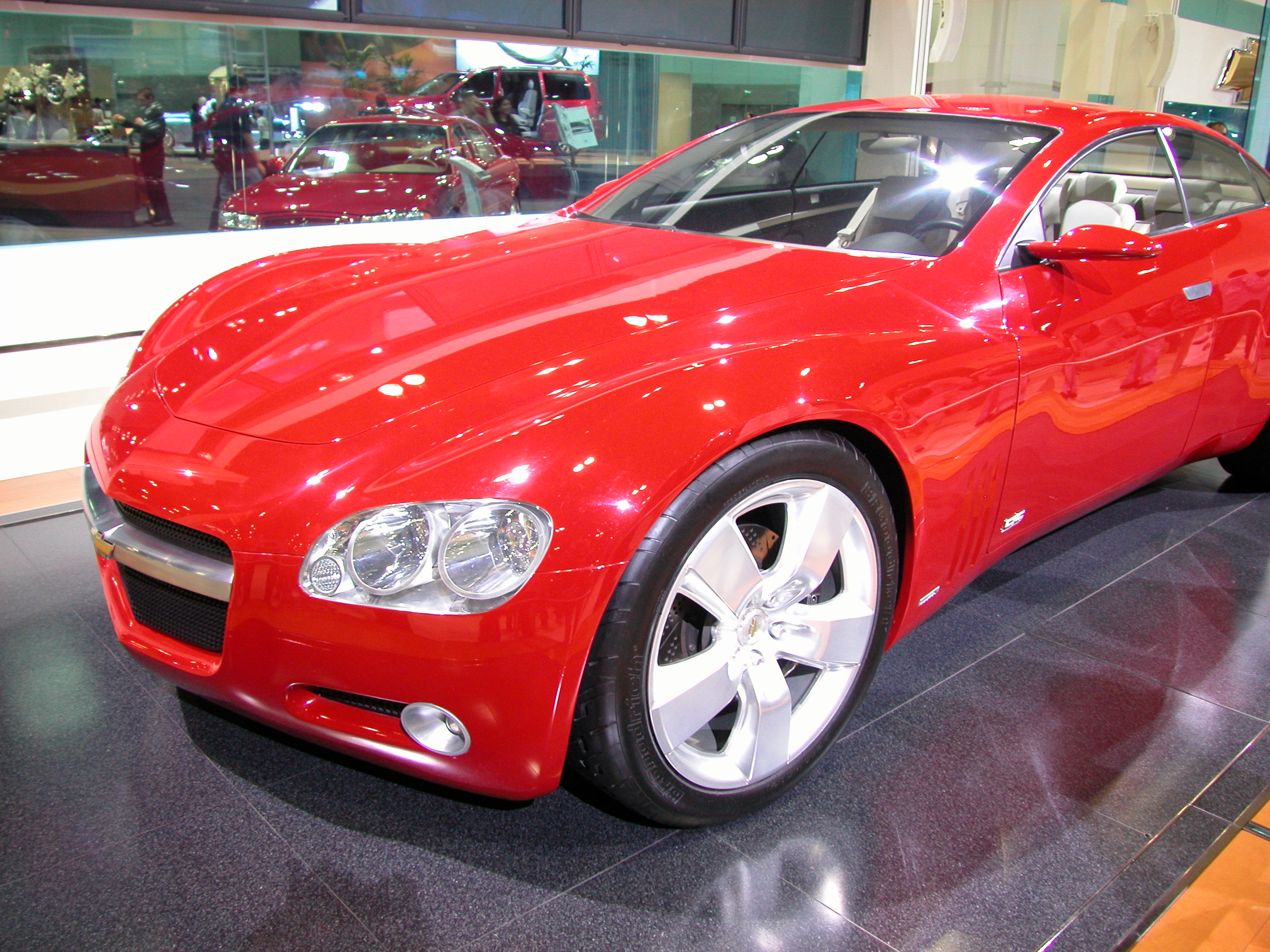
SS (2003)

- Chevrolet Aero 2003A (1987)
- Aerovette (1976)
- Astro I (1967)
- Astro II (1968)
- Astro III (1969)
- Astrovette (1968)
- Aveo RS (2010)
- Beat (concept) (2007)
- Bel Air Concept (2002)
- Biscayne (concept) (1955)
- Blazer XT-1 (1987)
- Bolt (2015)
- Borrego (2001)
- California IROC Camaro (1989)
- Camaro Black Concept (2008)
- Camaro Chroma Concept (2009)
- Camaro Concept (2006)
- Camaro Convertible Concept (2007)
- Camaro Convertible Concept (2010)
- Camaro Dale Earnhardt Jr. Concept (2008)
- Camaro Dusk Concept (2009)
- Camaro GS Racecar Concept (2008)
- Camaro LS7 Concept (2008)
- Camaro LT5 (1988)
- Camaro SS (concept) (2003)
- Camaro SSX (2010)
- Camaro z/28 (2012)
- Camaro ZL1 (concept) (2011)
- Caprice PPV (Concept) (2010)
- Cheyenne (concept) (2003)
- Citation IV (1984)
- Cobalt (concept) (2011)
- Code 130R (2012)
- Colorado Concept (2011)
- CERV (1960, 1964, 1990, 1992)
- Corvair (concept) (1954)
- Corvair (concept) (1960)
- Corvair Coupe Speciale (1960, 1962, 1963)
- Corvair Monza GT (1962)
- Corvair Monza SS (1962)
- Corvair Sebring Spyder (1961)
- Corvair Super Spyder (1962)
- Chevrolet Testudo (1963)
- Corvette (concept) (1953)
- Corvette C2 (concept) (1962)
- Corvette Indy (1986)
- Corvette Nivola (1990)
- Corvette Stingray (concept) (1959)
- Corvette Stingray (concept) (2009)
- Corvette XP-700 (1958)
- Corvette XP-819 Rear Engine (1964)
- Corvette Z03 (2008)
- Corvette Z06X (2010)
- Corvette ZR1 (concept) (2008)
- Corvette ZR2 (1989)
- Cruze (concept) (2010)
- Cruze Eco (concept) (2011)
- Cruze RS (concept) (2011)
- GPiX (2008)
- Equinox Xtreme (2003)
- E-Spark (2010)
- Express (1987)
- FNR (2015)
- FNR-XE (2022)
- Groove (2007)
- Highlander (1993)
- HHR (2005)
- Impala (concept) (1956)
- Jay Leno Camaro (2009)
- M3X (2004)
- Mako Shark (1961)
- Mako Shark II (1965)
- Malibu (concept) (2011)
- Malibu Maxx (2003)
- Miray (2012)
- Manta Ray (1969)
- Mulsanne (1974)
- Nomad (concept) (1954, 1999, 2004)
- Orlando (concept) (2008)
- Colorado Rally (2011)
- Q-Corvette (1957)
- Ramarro (1984)
- Rondine (1963)
- S3X (2004)
- Scirocco (1970)
- Sequel (2005)
- Silverado 427 Concept (2007)
- Silverado Orange County Choppers Hauler (2007)
- Silverado ZR2 (2010)
- Sonic (concept) (2010)
- Sonic Z-Spec (2011)
- SR-2 (1957)
- SS (2003)
- Suburban 75th Anniversary Diamond Edition (2010)
- Super Carry (van)
- Synergy Camaro concept (2009)
- T2X (2005)
- Tandem 2000 (1999)
- Trailblazer SS Concept (2002)
- Trax (2007)
- Triax (2000)
- Tru 140S (2012)
- Venture (1988)
- Volt (concept) (2007)
- Volt MPV5 EV (2010)
- Wedge Corvette (1963)
- WTCC Ultra (2006)
- XP-882 Four Rotor (1973)
- XP-895 Reynolds (1973)
- XP-897GT Two-Rotor (1973)
- XP-898 (1973)
- XT-2 (1989)
- YGM1 (1999)

== Experimental cars ==
- CERV I (1959)
- CERV II (1963)
- CERV III (1985)
- CERV IV (1993)
- CERV IV-B (1997)

== Prototypes ==
- Corvette (1983)
- Corvette ZR-1 Active Suspension prototype (1990)

== See also ==
- List of Chevrolet pickup trucks
