= Chevrolet straight-6 engine =

Chevrolet straight-6 engine may refer to:

- the 299-cubic-inch (4.9 L) T-head engine used in the 1911–1913 Chevrolet Series C Classic Six
- the 271-cubic-inch (4.4 L) L-head engine used in the 1914–1915 Chevrolet Light Six
- the Chevrolet Stovebolt engine series, introduced in 1929
- the Chevrolet Turbo-Thrift engine series, introduced in 1962

== See also ==
List of GM engines#Inline-6
