= List of Chevrolet pickup trucks =

List of pickup trucks manufactured by Chevrolet

This is a list of pickup trucks sold by American automobile manufacturer Chevrolet. Beginning with the Chevrolet Master in 1933, Chevrolet has manufactured full-size pickup trucks under many nameplates and platforms. Most Chevrolet pickup trucks have been sold simultaneously with rebadged GMC counterparts.

== Full-size pickup trucks ==
=== Pre-1960 models ===
Model	Image	Start of production	End of production
Chevrolet Master		1933	1942
Chevrolet AK Series		1941	1947
Chevrolet Deluxe (Australia) (Note: General Motors-Holden, which manufactured the Deluxe for the Australian market, sold a two-door coupé utility local variant exclusive to Australia)		1941	1952
Chevrolet Advance Design		1947	1955
Chevrolet Task Force		1955 (Note: There were two Chevy pickups in 1955. The First Series was a carryover and the new models were the Second Series.)	1959

=== Chevrolet C/K ===
The Chevrolet C/K is a line of pickup trucks and other vehicles manufactured by Chevrolet from 1960 to 2002. It was discontinued and replaced by the Chevrolet Silverado.

Generation	Image	Model	Start of production	End of production
First generation		C-10	1960	1966
First generation		C-14/C-15	1964	1973
First generation		C-20	1960	1966
First generation		Apache	1960	1966
First generation		Apache Crewcab	1960	1966
Second generation "Action Line"		C-10	1967	1972
Second generation "Action Line"		C-20	1967	1972
Third generation "Rounded Line"		C-10	1972	1991
Third generation "Rounded Line"		C-20	1972	1991
Third generation "Rounded Line"		K-10	1972	1991
Third generation "Rounded Line"		K-20	1972	1991
Third generation "Rounded Line"		A-10	1980	1984
Third generation "Rounded Line"		C-10 (South America)	1973	1984
Third generation "Rounded Line"		D-10	1978	1984
Third generation "Rounded Line"		A-20	1985	1997
Third generation "Rounded Line"		C-20 (South America)	1985	1997
Third generation "Rounded Line"		D-20	1985	1997
Fourth generation		C1500	1988	2000
Fourth generation		K1500	1988	2000
Fourth generation		C2500	1988	2000
Fourth generation		K2500	1988	2000
Fourth generation		C3500	1988	2000
Fourth generation		K3500	1988	2000
Fourth generation		454SS	1990	1993
Fourth generation		W/T 1500	1990	1998

=== Chevrolet Silverado ===
Introduced in 1998, the Chevrolet Silverado replaced the Chevrolet C/K as Chevrolet's flagship line of pickup trucks.

Generation	Image	Model	Start of production	End of production
First generation		1500	1998	2006
First generation		1500HD	1998	2006
First generation		2500HD	1998	2006
First generation		3500HD	1998	2006
First generation		Silverado SS	2003	2006
First generation		Silverado Hybrid	2004	2008
First generation		LSSV	2001	—
Second generation		1500	2007	2014
Second generation		2500HD	2007	2014
Second generation		3500HD	2007	2014
Second generation		Silverado Hybrid	2009	2013
Third generation		1500	2014	2019
Third generation		2500HD	2014	2019
Third generation		3500HD	2014	2019
Third generation		Silverado eAssist Mild Hybrid	2016	2019
Third generation		SSV	2015	2019
Fourth generation		1500	2019	—
Fourth generation		2500HD	2019	—
Fourth generation		3500HD	2019	—

=== Chevrolet Silverado EV ===
The Chevrolet Silverado EV is a battery electric full-size pickup truck that went on sale in the fall of 2023 as part of the 2024 model year. Although it uses the Silverado nameplate, it shares few structural traits with the Silverado line, and is instead based on the electric platform used by the GMC Hummer EV.

Model	Image	Start of production	End of production
Chevrolet Silverado EV		2024	—

=== Chevrolet Avalanche ===
The Chevrolet Avalanche was manufactured for twelve years from 2001 to 2013, producing two generations in its lifespan.

Generation	Image	Start of production	End of production
First generation		2001	2006
Second generation		2007	2013

== Mid-size pickup trucks ==
Chevrolet has also sold or produced many compact and mid-size pickup trucks.

Model	Image	Generation	Start of production	End of production
Chevrolet Colorado		First generation	2004	2012
Chevrolet Colorado		Second generation	2011	—
Chevrolet Colorado		Second generation (North American version)	2015	2023
Chevrolet Colorado		Third generation (North American version)	2023	—
Chevrolet D-Max (a rebadged Isuzu D-Max)		First generation	2002	2011
Chevrolet D-Max (a rebadged Isuzu D-Max)		Second generation	2012	—
Chevrolet S10 Max (a rebadged Maxus T70)		First generation	2021	—
Chevrolet LUV (a rebadged Isuzu Faster)		First generation	1972	1980
Chevrolet LUV (a rebadged Isuzu Faster)		Second generation	1980	1988
Chevrolet LUV (a rebadged Isuzu Faster)		Third generation	1988	2005
Chevrolet Montana		First generation	2003	2010
Chevrolet Montana		Second generation	2011	2020
Chevrolet Montana		Third generation	2021	—
Chevrolet S-10		First generation	1982	1993
Chevrolet S-10		Second generation	1994	2004
Chevrolet S-10 EV		First generation	1997	1998

== Coupé utility pickup trucks ==
Over the course of the 20th century, Chevrolet sold several lines of coupé utility vehicles based on passenger cars.

Model	Image	Generation	Start of production	End of production
Chevrolet Chevy 500		Latin American	1983	1994
Chevrolet Corsa		Corsa B	1993	1999
Chevrolet El Camino		First generation	1959	1960
Chevrolet El Camino		Second generation	1964	1967
Chevrolet El Camino		Third generation	1968	1972
Chevrolet El Camino		Fourth generation	1973	1977
Chevrolet El Camino		Fifth generation	1978	1987
Chevrolet SSR		First generation	2003	2007

== See also ==
- List of Chevrolet vehicles
