= Chevrolet Series H =

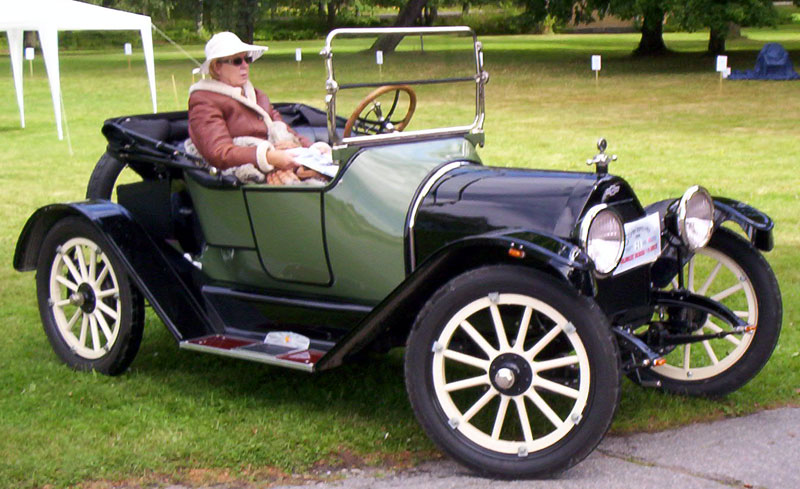
- 1915 Chevrolet Series H-2 Royal Mail

Overview
- Manufacturer: Chevrolet
- Also called: H-2 and H-2½ Chevrolet Royal Mail Roadster; H-4 Chevrolet Baby Grand Touring; H-3 Chevrolet Amesbury Special
- Production: 1914–1916
- Assembly: United States: Flint, Michigan (Flint Assembly)

Body and chassis
- Class: mid-size
- Body style: H-2/H-2½/H-3 2-door roadster H-4 4-door touring
- Layout: FR layout
- Related: Chevrolet Light Six Series L

Powertrain
- Engine: 171 in^{3} (2.80 L), 24 hp (18 kW), I4
- Transmission: Selective-sliding 3-speed cone clutch

Dimensions
- Wheelbase: 104 in (2,642 mm) (1914); 106 in (2,692 mm) (1915-16)

Chronology
- Predecessor: Chevrolet Series C Classic Six
- Successor: Chevrolet Series F

The Royal Mail models H-2 (1914–1915) and H-2½ (1916), the Amesbury Special model H-3 (1915) and the Baby Grand model H-4 (1914–1916) were American cars produced by Chevrolet from 1914 to 1916. It was replaced by the Chevrolet Series F in 1917.

== Beginning ==
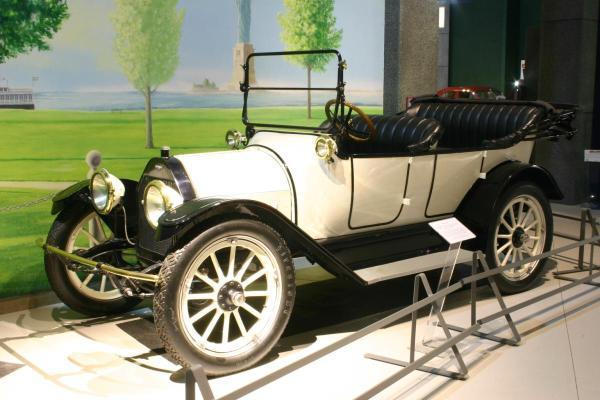
1914 Chevrolet H-4 Baby Grand

The Baby Grand was one of the first automobiles made by Chevrolet under W.C. Durant, GM's founder. It was part of his idea to build a car to compete with the very popular and affordable Ford Model T. When it first came out, it was priced at US$875 ($28,125 in 2025 dollars) as a four-door, 5-passenger touring car (a 1914 Model T touring was US$500 ($16,071 in 2025 dollars)). A speedometer was standard. One advantage over a Model T Ford was that a Baby Grand could get an electric starter (the Model T did not get them until 1919).

== Models ==
In 1914 the Series H debuted with the H-2 Royal Mail Roadster and the H-4 5-seater Baby Grand Touring model, both with a 104 in (2,642 mm) wheelbase.

In 1915, all Series H models got a longer 106 in (2,692 mm) wheelbase and larger brakes, and an electric starter was now standard.

Also for 1915 Chevrolet introduced the Amesbury Special model H-3, a 3-seat roadster (similar to the Royal Mail) that sold for $985. It came painted in French grey with green patent leather interior. The standard wheels were the plain wooden spoke type, but most of the cars sold had the optional Houk wire wheels which cost $125 extra and were painted green to match the interior. This model was dropped after one year due to lack of sales.

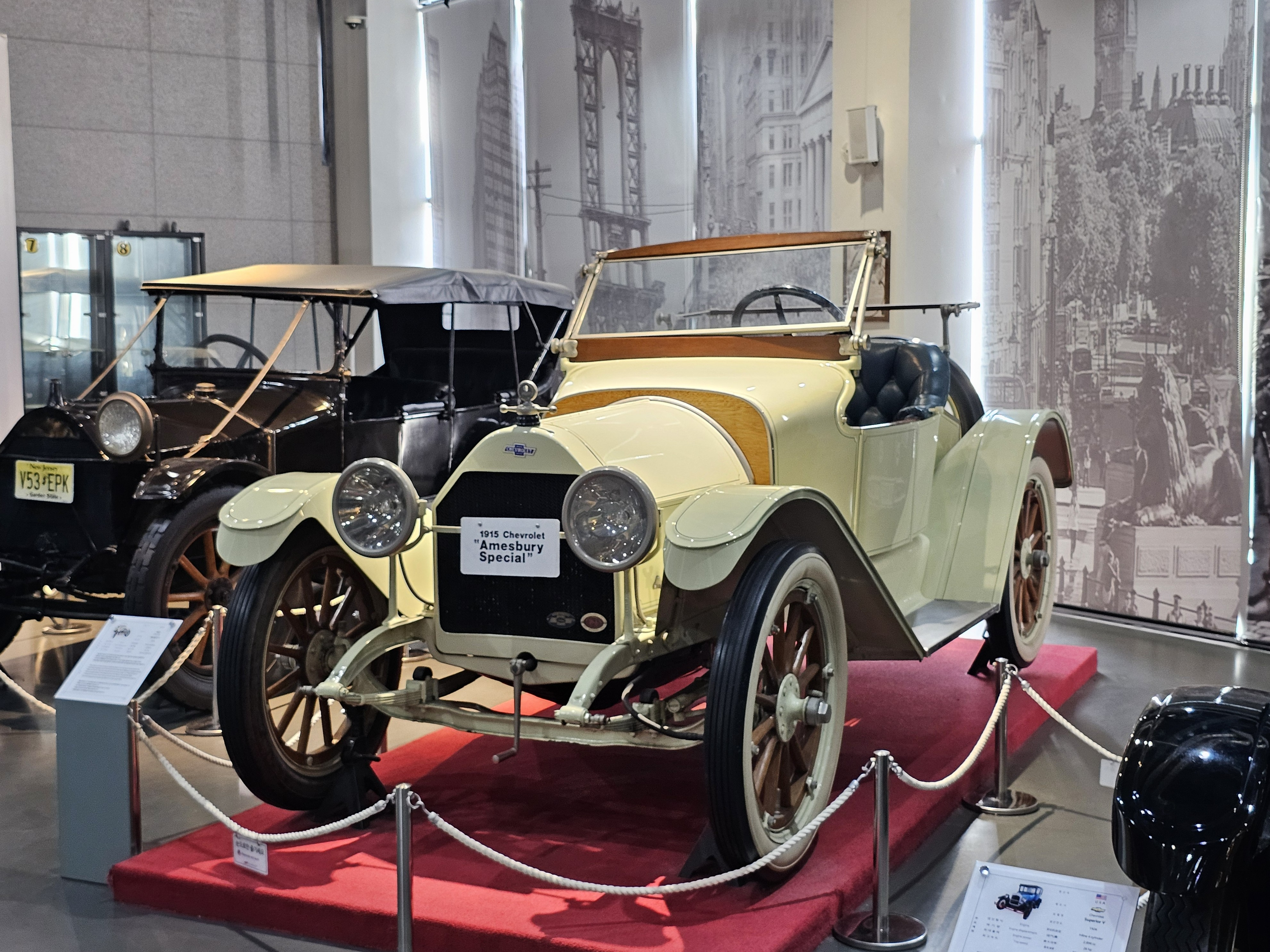
1915 Chevrolet H-3 Amesbury Special

In 1916, the Royal Mail model H-2½ was introduced which was the first integral trunk for Chevrolet with gas tank in the rear between the frame rails.

The Series H models were moved upmarket when the $490 Chevrolet 490 was introduced in June 1915 to compete directly with the Ford Model T.

Total Chevrolet production for 1913 was 5,987.
