= Chevrolet Series C Classic Six =

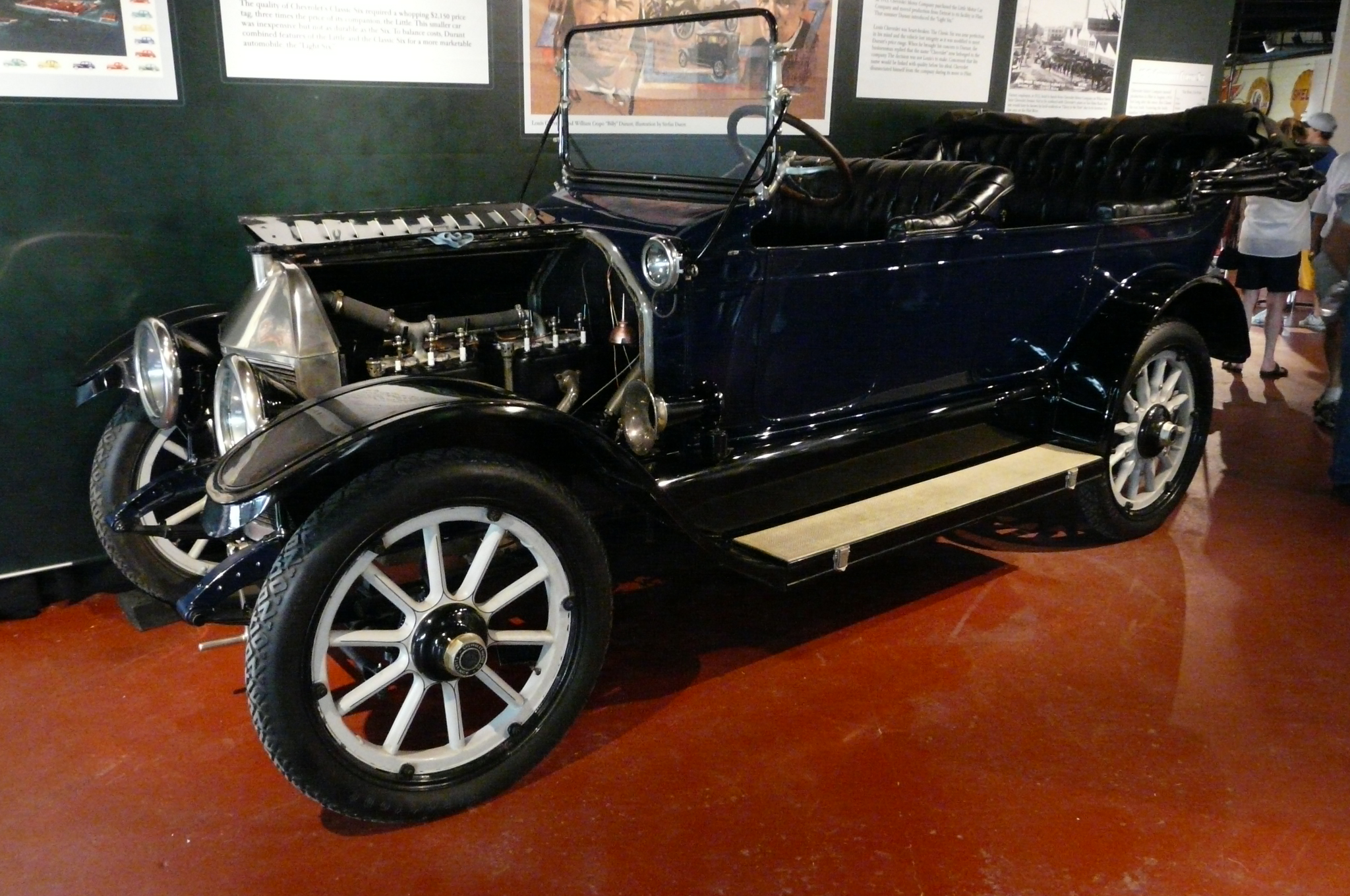

Overview
- Manufacturer: Chevrolet
- Production: 1911–1914
- Model years: 1911–1913
- Assembly: United States: Flint, Michigan (Flint Assembly)
- Designer: Etienne Planche

Body and chassis
- Class: Full-size
- Body style: 4-door touring
- Layout: FR layout
- Related: The Little Automobile

Powertrain
- Engine: 299 cu in (4,900 cc), 40 hp (30 kW), T-head I6
- Transmission: Rear-mounted 3-speed, with a cone clutch

Dimensions
- Wheelbase: 120.0 in (3,048 mm)
- Curb weight: 3,500–3,750 lb (1,588–1,701 kg)

Chronology
- Successor: Chevrolet Series L Chevrolet Series H

The Chevrolet Series C Classic Six is the first automobile produced by American car manufacturer Chevrolet, from 1911 to 1914. It is one of the few Chevrolets made while record-setting Buick race car driver Louis Chevrolet was with the company. This Brass Era Chevy was much larger, more powerful, more stylized and therefore more expensive than the cars that would ultimately replace it. Louis Chevrolet loved it, but William Durant had a cheaper car in mind.

== The first Chevrolet ==
The 1912–14 Chevrolet Type C, also called the Chevrolet Classic Six (Series C), Chevrolet Model C, Classic Six, or, at the time it was new, simply "the Chevrolet" (since there were no other models to confuse it with until 1914 when the models H and L were released), was the first Chevrolet, and was also sold by other makes. It was a well constructed car and had a six-cylinder engine up front with a cone clutch and a three-speed gearbox mounted at the rear axle. Henry Ford had been selling his much less expensive Model T for three years, in six models by the time Chevrolet entered the market. The Chevrolets that followed, under the management of Durant, would be much cheaper four-cylinder cars that competed directly with the T. The Series C Classic Six, however, was capable of 65 mph and competed against the more high-performance cars of that time. Standard equipment included a starter, four doors, a folding top, a tool box, cowl lights, and electric headlights. The 1914 Classic Six was in essence the 1913 model with a few slight changes.

=== Design ===
Penned by Etienne Planche under direction from Louis Chevrolet, the Chevy with its low running boards had a design more resembling European cars. The radiator shell and Chevrolet nameplate on the dashboard (the "bow-tie" emblem did not appear until the 1914 Chevrolet Series H and L models) were polished metal, while the body, chassis, and wheels were only Chevrolet blue. The hood, fenders, and splash aprons were black. Light gray striping was found on the body and wheels. The first prototype car appeared in late 1911, and Louis Chevrolet himself tested it on the back streets of Detroit. Throughout 1912, refinements were made to the design. Later in that same year, the new 1913 model was released at the New York Auto Show.

=== The T-head engine ===
Chevrolet's first engine was a liquid-cooled 299-cubic-inch, six-cylinder, cast-iron block cast in three groups of two, with a T-head configuration, that produced 40 horsepower. The T-head engine is a side valve engine that is distinguished from the much more common L-head engine by its placement of the valves. The intake valves are on one side of the engine block and the exhaust valves on the other, making dual camshafts necessary. Seen from the end of the crankshaft, in cutaway view, the cylinder and combustion chamber resembles a T; hence the name "T-head." The 299 was a very large engine at that time and the only engine in the C Series. In 1913, the ignition was a Simms magneto with a compressed-air starter. For 1914 the ignition was now a Simms High Tension Magneto and the starter used was a Gray & Davis. This was the biggest Chevy engine until the 1958, 348 cid V-8.

== Production notes ==
Year	Production	Base Price	Weight	Notes
1911	1	N/A	3,500 lbs.	prototype, no windshield or top
1912	(See text below)	$2,250	3,000 lbs.	
1913	(See text below)	$2,250	3,500 lbs.	
1914	(See text below)	$2,500	3,750 lbs.	

The prototype of Planche's design was built in 1911. After several improvements were made to the car, they began production for commercial sales in late 1912. Production continued through 1913 and was stopped in 1914. The base price was US$2,250 (equivalent to $77,746 in 2025).

== Production amount ==
Due to conflicting production records, it is unclear how many were actually made. Total Chevrolet production for 1913 was 5,987. But this figure included all Little Motor Car Co. production (the Little Motor car was made in the same factory) and could also have included all the 1914 models produced in 1913. It is doubtful given the high price of the car that many were made and sold. The serial number of the below listed existing cars at the Sloan Museum and the Reynolds-Alberta Museum in Canada may or may not be indicative of the exact number built.

== Surviving examples ==
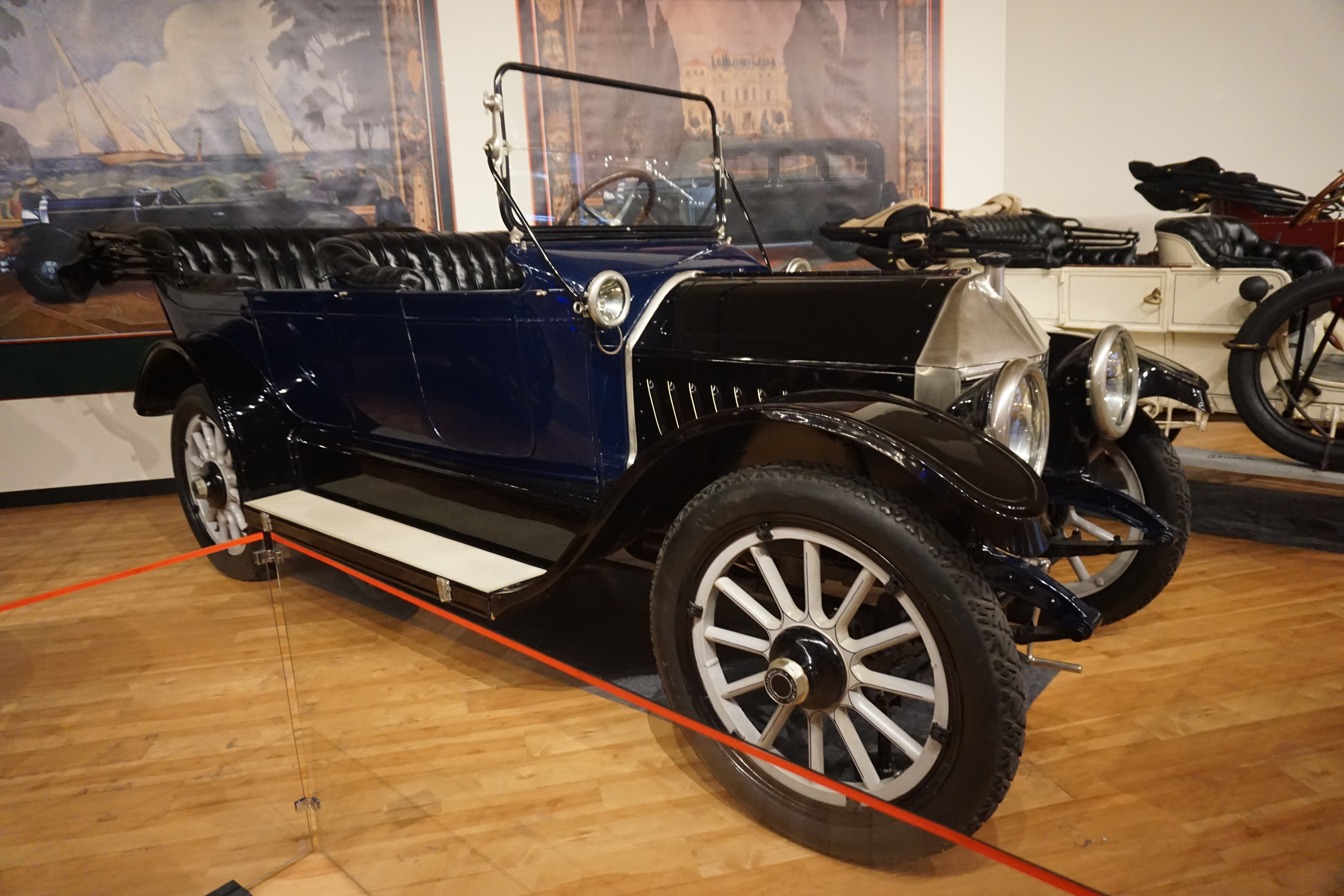
1913 Chevrolet Classic Six at the Sloan Museum

There are only two Classic Sixes known to exist. The oldest example is a 1913 model, serial #93 located in the Reynolds-Alberta Museum in Canada and is an unrestored partial car. The other is also a 1913 model, serial #323 located in Flint, Michigan at the Alfred P. Sloan Museum (shown above). This car is the only complete and fully restored running example.

The Sloan Museum car was first purchased in southern Texas. The Classic 6 was driven daily until 1936, when it was bought by the Aldenhaven Family in Ft. Worth (who owned a Chevy dealership). It remained part of their collection until 1964, when it was placed up for auction. The Sloan Museum had been following the car for some time, and sent two employees to Texas with a signed check. The Chevy was twice bid up beyond the museum's offer, but the Aldenhavens accepted the museum's offer any way, as they knew the car would be appreciated and well kept.

In Cambodia, there is a Chevrolet Classic Six–like car known as the Masthead Car. This car operated for tourists in Angkor temples in Siem Reap.

=== Related Cars ===
William Durant assembled these three companies to form Chevrolet:

- The Little Motor Car Company
- The Mason Motor Company
- The Republic Motor Company

Louis Chevrolet left Chevrolet Motor Car Company in 1915, and by 1916, had started a race car company with his brother Gaston Chevrolet.

- The Frontenac Motor Corporation

== See also ==
- List of Chevrolet vehicles
