= Chevrolet Triax =

American concept SUV

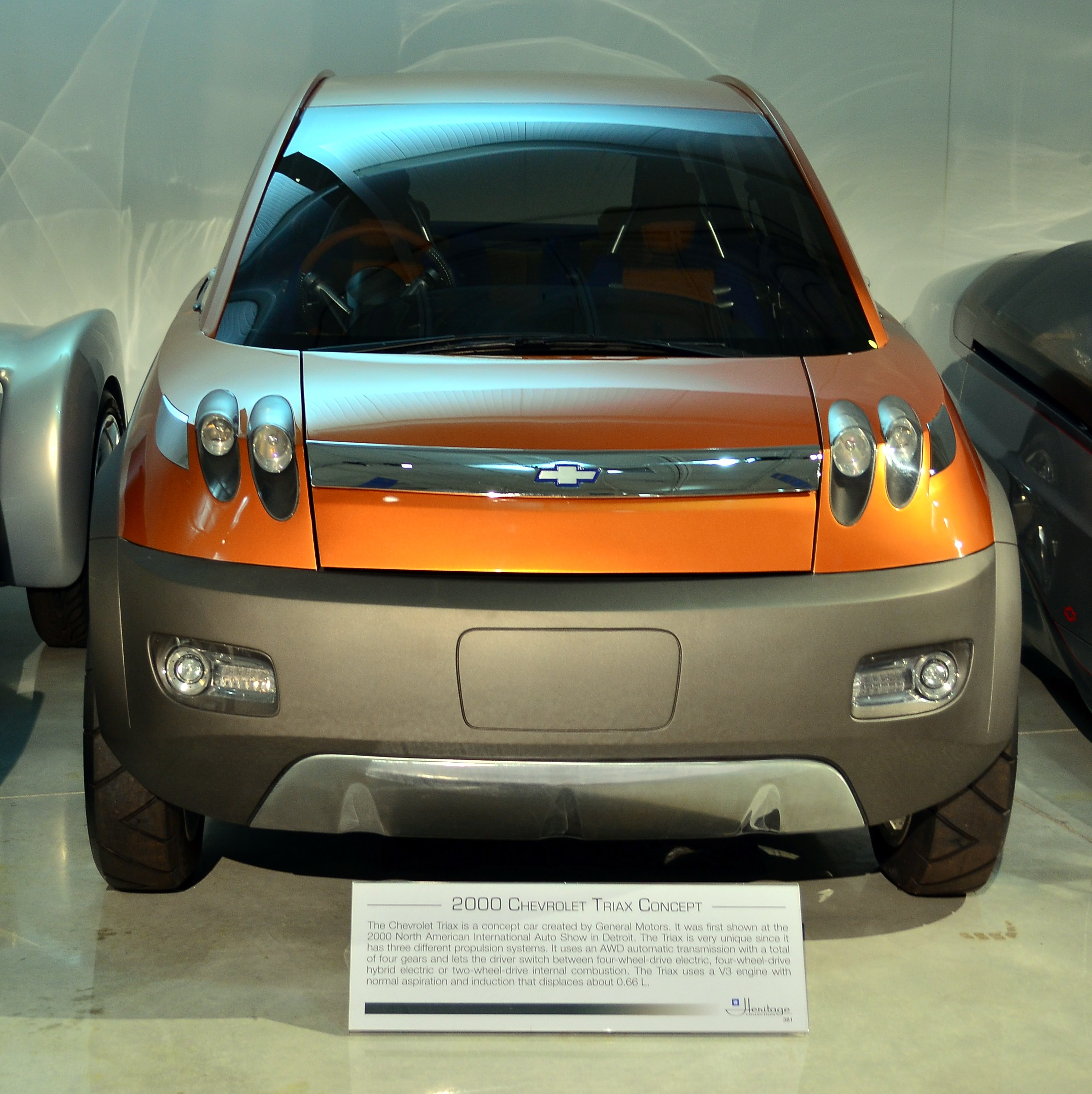

Overview
- Manufacturer: Chevrolet (General Motors)
- Production: 2000

Body and chassis
- Class: Concept car
- Body style: 5-door SUV
- Layout: Front-engine, four-wheel-drive layout

Powertrain
- Engine: 0.66L V3
- Transmission: 4-speed automatic
- Hybrid drivetrain: Parallel hybrid

The Chevrolet Triax is a concept sport utility vehicle created by Chevrolet. It was shown at the 1999 Tokyo Motor Show and the 2000 North American International Auto Show.

The Triax uses a 0.66 liter V3 engine with normal aspiration and induction. It featured an AWD automatic transmission with a total of four gears. The Triax has three different propulsion systems. It allows the driver switch between four-wheel-drive electric, four-wheel-drive hybrid electric, or two-wheel-drive internal combustion.
