= Chevrolet Aerovette =

Chevrolet Aerovette Concept
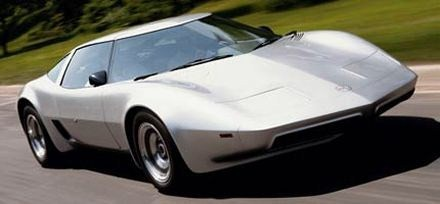
- 1977 Chevrolet Aerovette Concept

Overview
- Manufacturer: General Motors
- Also called: Chevrolet XP-882; Chevrolet XP-895
- Designer: Jerry Palmer

Body and chassis
- Class: Sports car
- Body style: 2-door Coupe
- Layout: Rear mid-engine, rear-wheel-drive layout
- Doors: Gullwing doors
- Related: Chevrolet Corvette

Powertrain
- Engine: 4 rotor Wankel engine (XP-895); 2 rotor Wankel engine (XP-897GT); 400 cu in (6.6 liter) Chevrolet V8 (Aerovette)

Dimensions
- Curb weight: 1180 kg (2601.5 lbs) (with Rotary engine)

The Chevrolet Aerovette was a concept car created by Chevrolet, beginning life as Experimental Project 882 (XP-882) in the late 1960s. It had a mid-engine configuration using a transverse mounting of its V8 engine. Zora Arkus-Duntov's engineers originally built two XP-882 prototypes during 1969, but John DeLorean, Chevrolet's general manager, canceled the program believing it to be impractical and costly. However, when Ford announced plans to sell the DeTomaso Pantera through Lincoln-Mercury dealers, DeLorean ordered that one XP-882 prototype be cleaned up for display at the 1970 New York Auto Show.

== History ==
In 1972, DeLorean authorized further work on the XP-882 chassis and gave it a new project code, XP-895. A near-identical body in aluminum alloy that resembled the XP-895 was constructed, and became the "Reynolds Aluminum Car." Two of the Chevrolet Vega 2-rotor engines were joined as a 4-rotor, 420 hp (313 kW) engine, which was used to power XP-895. The XP-895 was first shown in late 1973. Another Corvette concept, XP-897GT, also appeared in 1973, which used a 2-rotor engine. However, with the energy crisis of the time, GM scrapped its rotary development work and all plans for a Wankel-powered car. The XP-897GT 2-rotor Concept was sold to Tom Falconer and fitted with a Mazda 13B rotary engine in 1997.

In 1976, the 4-rotor engine was replaced by a 400 cu in (6,600 cc) Chevrolet V8, and the concept car was named Aerovette and approved for production for 1980. The Aerovette featured double folding gullwing doors. The production car would use a 350 cu in (5,700 cc) V8, and be priced between $15,000-$18,000. However, after chief supporters Duntov, Bill Mitchell, and Ed Cole had retired from General Motors, David R. McLellan decided that a front/mid-engine car would be more economical to build and would have better performance, and canceled the Aerovette program entirely. Contemporary imported rear mid-engine cars had poor sales in the United States compared to the front-engined Datsun 240Z, which ultimately determined the Aerovette's fate, further contributing to termination of production plans.
