= Chevrolet Astrovette =

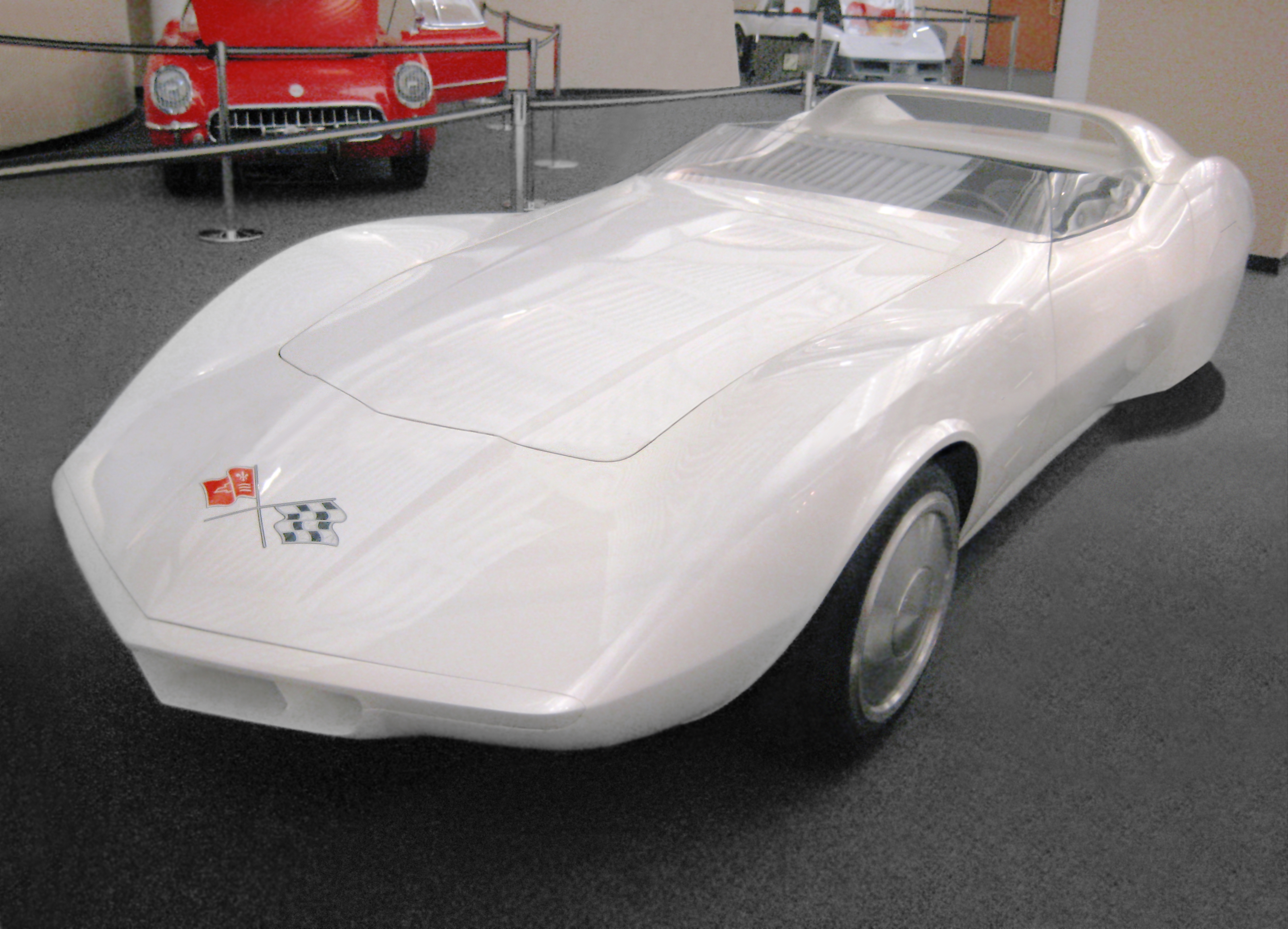

Overview
- Manufacturer: General Motors
- Production: 1968

Body and chassis
- Class: Concept car
- Body style: 2-door roadster
- Layout: FR layout
- Related: Chevrolet Corvette

Powertrain
- Engine: 427 ci (7.0L) L68 V8
- Transmission: Automatic Turbo Hydra-Matic transmission

The Chevrolet Astrovette was part of an aerodynamic study to enhance the aerodynamics of the Corvette.

Introduced in 1968, it featured an extended nose, roadster windshield, closed rear wheel openings and an extended, tapered tail. It also featured pressure actuated flaps on the fenders designed open if pressure under the hood got too high (the flaps on the concept were just for display and were never made functional).

The car is based on a blue 1968 Corvette convertible and the interior was kept stock except for a racing steering wheel. The engine is a 400 hp L-68 427 that came in the base car. In 1992 the car was restored to its original show car specs.

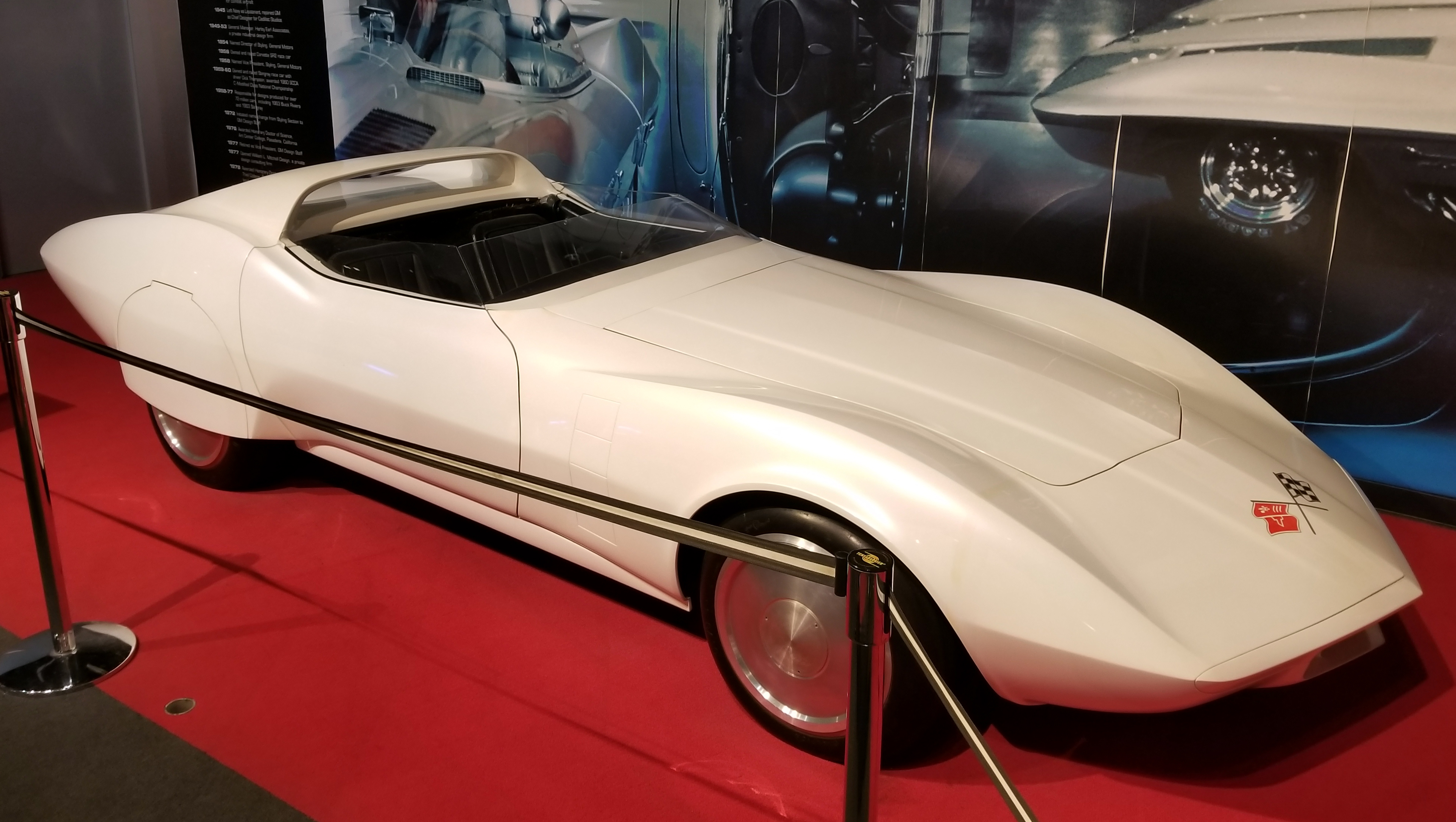
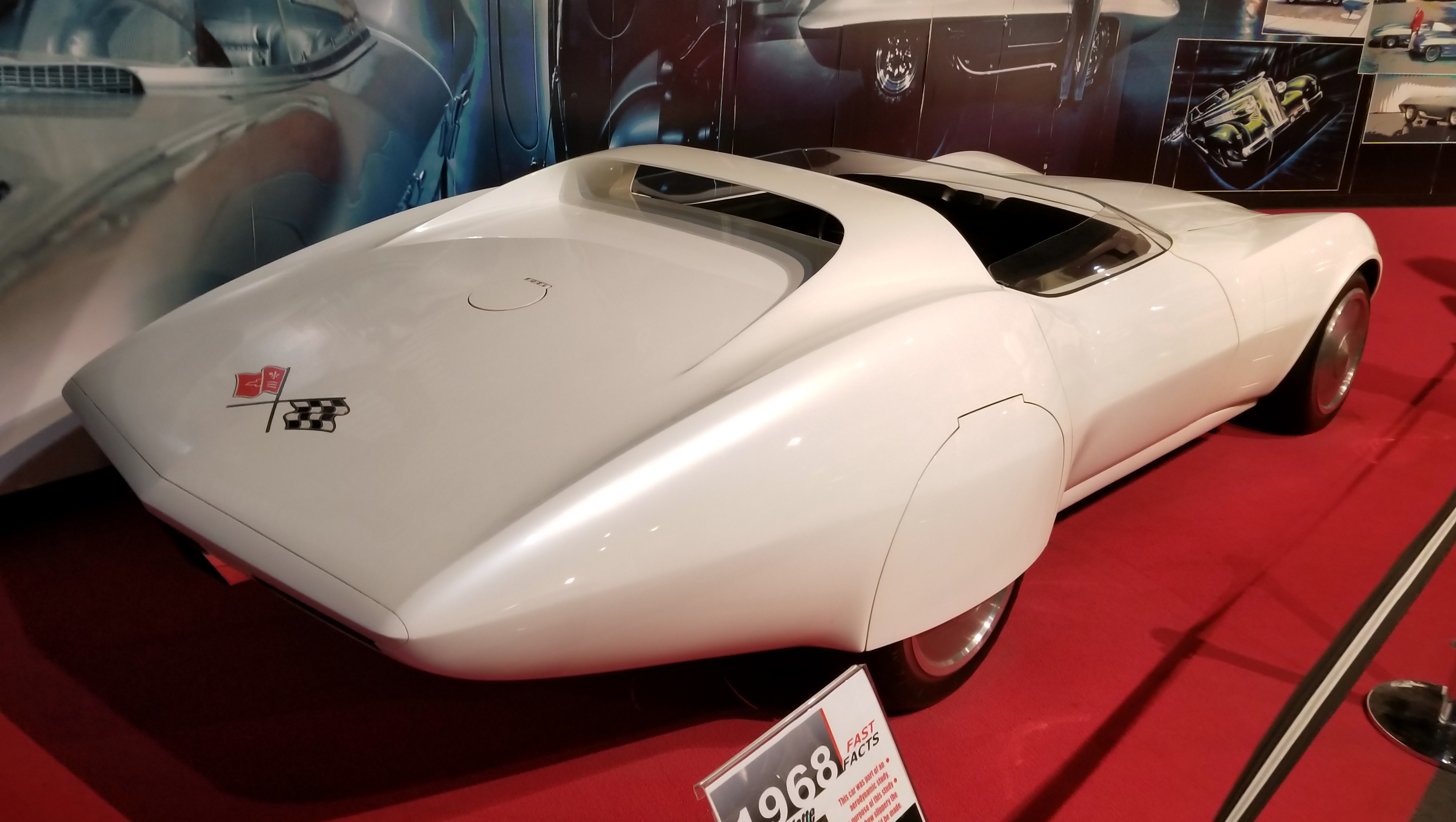
