= Cone clutch =

Type of clutch

Schematic drawing of a cone clutch: 1. Cones: female cone (green), male cone (blue); 2. Shaft: male cone is sliding on the splines; 3. Friction material: usually on female cone, here on male cone; 4. Spring: brings the male cone back after using the clutch control; 5. Clutch control: separating both cones by pressing; 6. Rotating direction: both direction of the axis are possible

A cone clutch serves the same purpose as a disk or plate clutch; however, instead of mating two spinning disks, the cone clutch uses two conical surfaces to transmit torque by friction.

The cone clutch transfers a higher torque than plate or disk clutches of the same size due to the wedging action and increased surface area. Cone clutches are generally now only used in low-peripheral-speed applications, although they were once common in automobiles and other internal combustion engine transmissions.

They are usually now confined to very specialist transmissions used in racing, rallying, or extreme off-road vehicles, although they are common in power boats, dredge pumps and other ship-drive lines. This is because the clutch does not have to be pushed in all the way, which allows the gears to be changed more quickly. Small cone clutches are used in synchronizer mechanisms in manual transmissions and some limited-slip differentials.

== Applications ==
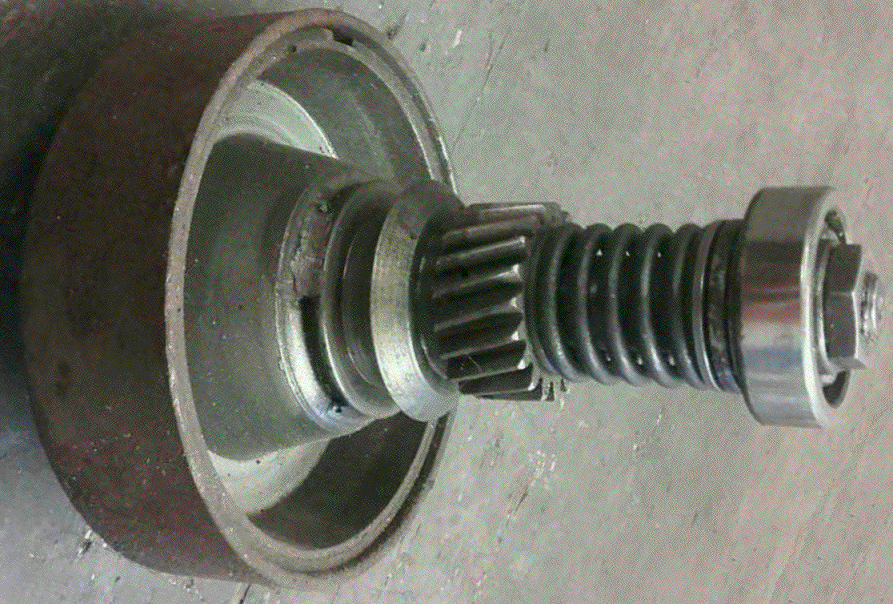
Cone clutch of a walk-behind sickle mower

- Cone clutches are used in various manual transmissions, such as synchronisers.
- They are used in various heavy machines, since they can transmit high torque.
- These clutches are generally used in low-peripheral-speed applications.
- Cone clutches are commonly used in power racing boats.
- Cone clutches are used in racing and rallying vehicles.
- Cone clutches are used in some automobiles and other combustion engine transmissions.
