= Chevrolet Light Six =

Chevrolet Series L Light Six
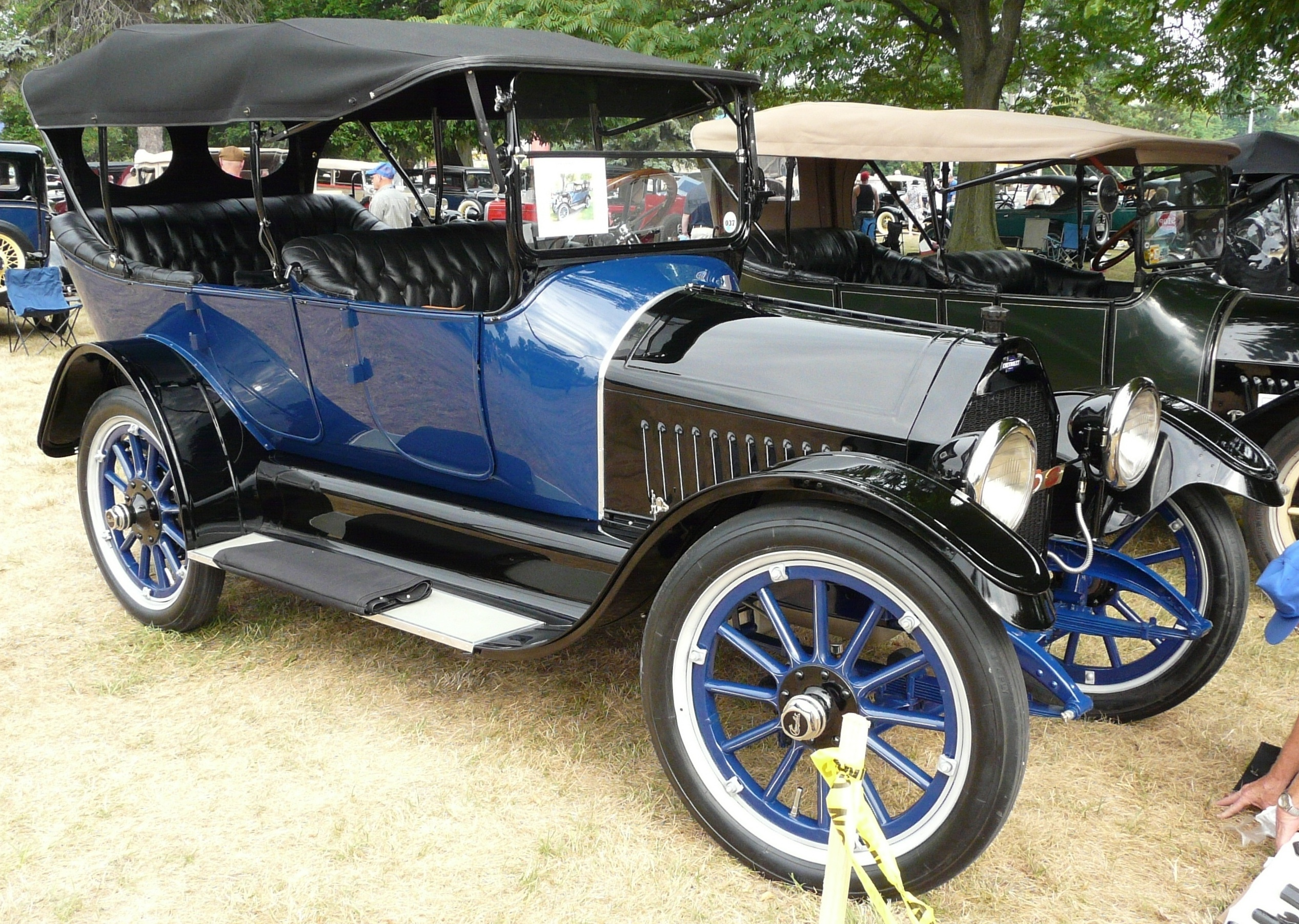

Overview
- Manufacturer: Chevrolet
- Production: 1914–1915
- Assembly: United States: Flint, Michigan (Flint Assembly)

Body and chassis
- Class: Full-size car
- Body style: 5 passenger, 4-door touring
- Layout: FR layout

Powertrain
- Engine: 271 in^{3} 35 hp, L head I6
- Transmission: Rear-mounted selective sliding 3-speed, with a cone clutch

Dimensions
- Wheelbase: 112.0 in (2,845 mm)

Chronology
- Predecessor: Chevrolet Series C Classic Six
- Successor: Chevrolet Series D

The Chevrolet Series L Light Six was an American car produced by Chevrolet in 1914 and 1915. The Chevrolet 'Bow Tie' emblem debuted in 1914 and has been used on all Chevrolet cars and trucks since. When the Classic Six ceased production at the end of the 1914 model year the Light Six replaced it in 1915 as Chevrolet's top-of-the-line offering.

== Features ==
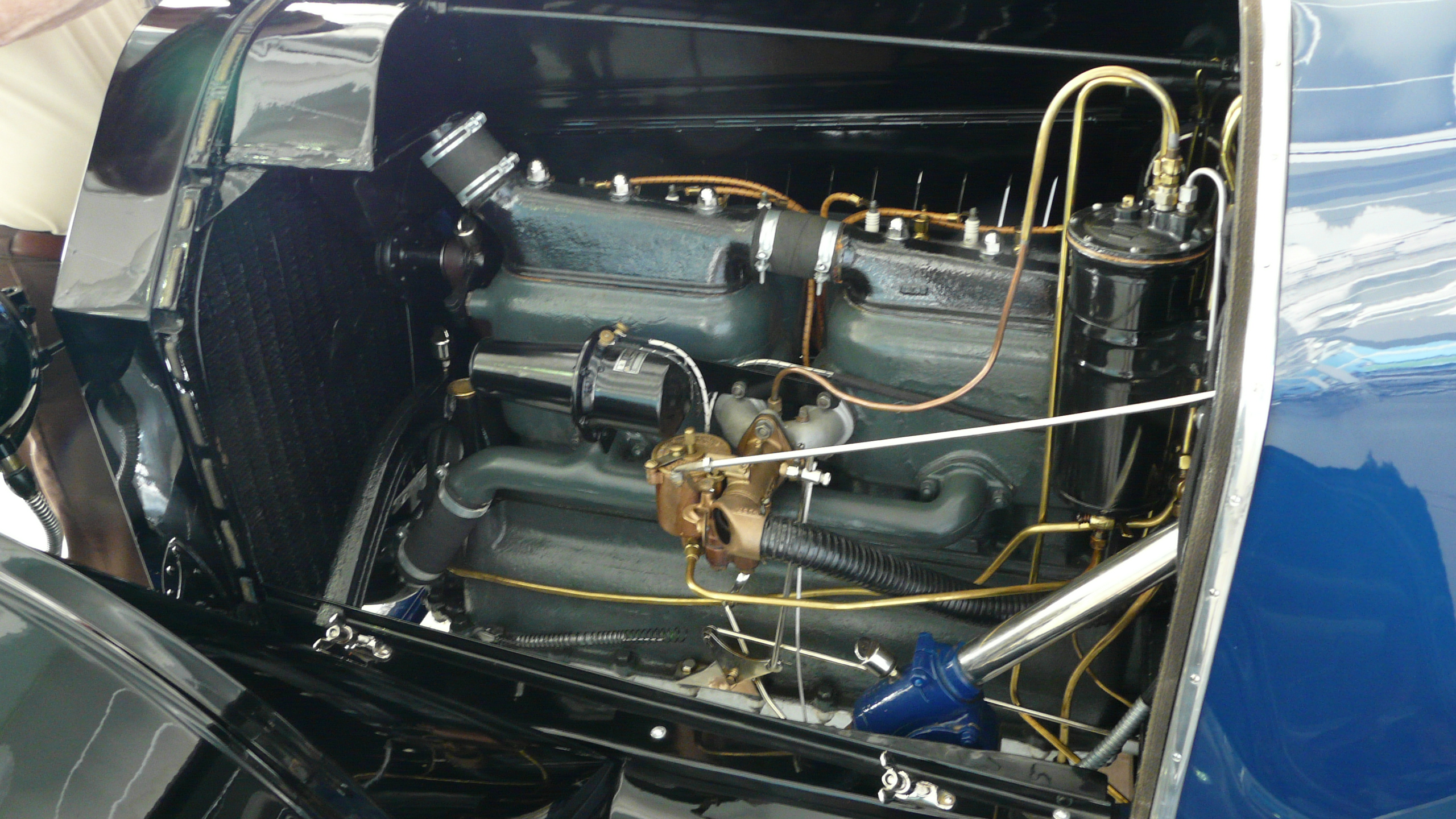
1914 Chevrolet Light Six Engine Compartment

The L Series used a Sterling six-cylinder L-head engine rated at 35 bhp and an Autolite electric starter. A cone-style clutch was mounted to the engine with a drive shaft that was connected to a rear-end mounted selective sliding 3-speed transmission. The car used a 3/4 floating type rear suspension with 34 in × 4 in (860 mm × 100 mm) tires.

The L Series was a 5-passenger four-door touring car and cost US$1,475 ($47,411 in 2025 dollars). It was competitive with the Buick Six in both size and price.

Available body colors were Chevrolet Blue or Gunmetal Grey. The hood, radiator, and fenders were all painted black. The chassis and wheels were blue. Also included was light grey pinstriping on the wheel spokes and hood vents.

Series L production ran from 1914 through 1915. Chevrolet Motor Company records indicate approximately 1000 were made.

== Surviving example ==
The only known surviving Light Six is a 1914 model displayed in the GM Heritage collection museum. It was previously owned by a member of the Vintage Chevrolet Club of America, Pinky Randall, also known as "Mr. Chevrolet", before he sold it to the museum.
