= List of best-selling automobiles =

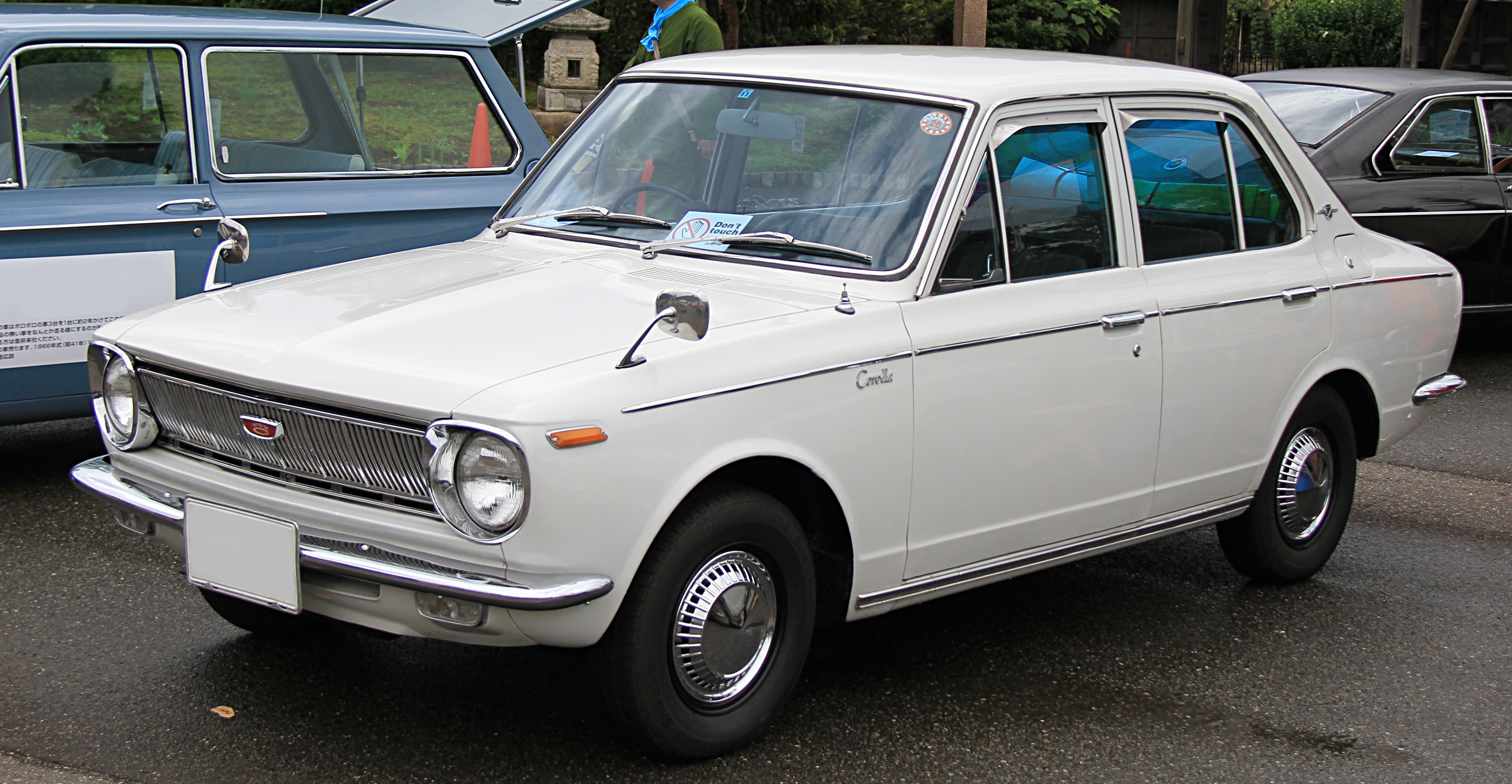
The Toyota Corolla is the best-selling automobile of all time (first-generation model of 1968 pictured).

Since the introduction of the Benz Patent Motorwagen in 1886, some passenger cars and light trucks can claim to being the highest selling vehicles in the automobile markets.

While references to verify the manufacturers' claims have been included, there is always the possibility of inaccuracy or hyperbole. A single vehicle can be sold concurrently under several nameplates in different markets, as with, for example, the Nissan Sunny; in such circumstances, manufacturers often provide only cumulative units sold figures for all models. As a result, there is no definitive standard for measuring units sold; Chrysler minivans has sold over 16 million worldwide, while Volkswagen has claimed its Beetle is the best-selling car in history, as it did not substantially change throughout its production run. By contrast, Toyota has applied the Corolla nameplate to 12 generations since 1966, which have sold over 50 million through 2021.

== Global bestsellers ==
Best-selling car nameplates of all time
Image	Nameplate	Production	Units sold	Notes
	Toyota Corolla	1966–present	50,000,000	
	Ford F-Series	1948–present	43,000,000	
	Volkswagen Golf	1974–present	37,000,000	
	Volkswagen Passat	1973–present	34,000,000	
	Honda Civic	1972–present	28,000,000	
	Toyota Camry	1982–present	22,000,000	
	Ford Fiesta	1976–2023	22,000,000	
	Volkswagen Beetle	1938–2003	21,500,000	
	Toyota Hilux	1968–present	21,000,000	
	Honda Accord	1976–present	19,500,000	

Three cars have been widely acknowledged as the "bestselling automobile in the world" since Ford built its millionth Model T on December 10, 1915. The Model T itself remained the highest seller until forty five years after production ceased in 1927. On February 17, 1972, Volkswagen claimed that the Ford had been surpassed by the Beetle, when the 15,007,034th was manufactured. Although the Model T has subsequently been credited with 16.5 million units sold, the error is inconsequential in light of the Beetle reaching 21 million. The Model T was eventually surpassed within Ford by the Ford F-Series, a pickup truck that is directly descended from the Model T roadster pickup.

The Beetle remained the bestselling vehicle in the car industry until the late 1990s, when it was overtaken by the more modern and efficient Toyota Corolla. However, this was an example of the modern practice of applying a brand name across a wide range of vehicles, and retaining it for marketing purposes even as the car changes drastically. While the first Corolla in 1966 was rear-wheel drive and rode on a 2286 mm wheelbase, the current hybrid and all-wheel drive models share a 2640 mm wheelbase and use a mechanically unrelated platform. Sales of the Beetle were also surpassed by its successor nameplate, the Volkswagen Golf.

Cars that historically held the record for best-selling car of all time
Image	Automobile	Production	Record period	Units sold	Notes
1927 Ford Model-T.	Ford Model T	1908–1927	1915–1972	16,500,000	The first car to achieve one million, five million, ten million and fifteen million units sold. In 1914, it was estimated that nine out of every ten cars in the world were Fords.
1961 Volkswagen Type 1 "Beetle" with occupants and passersby standing near it.	Volkswagen Beetle	1938–2003	1972–1997	21,529,464	The first car to achieve twenty million units sold.
2019 Toyota Corolla.	Toyota Corolla	1966–present	1997–present	50,000,000 by 2021	The 50 million milestone was reached in 2021. However, the nameplate has been applied on twelve different generations of cars.

== Brand bestsellers ==
=== Current brands ===
Brand	Image	Automobile	Production	Units sold and notes
Alfa Romeo	1979 Alfasud ti	Alfa Romeo Alfasud	1972–1989	1,017,387.
Alpine	Alpine-Renault A310	Alpine A110 (2017)	2017–present	18,985.
Aston Martin	Aston Martin DBX.	Aston Martin DBX	2020–present	10,675 to end of 2023.
Audi	Picture of a silver Audi A4 sedan parked on a street.	Audi A4	1994–2025	Over 7,500,000 to 2019
Baojun	Baojun 510	Baojun 510	2017–2025	972,042 to 2021. Notable for being a highest-selling newly introduced automobile nameplate in world's history.
BMW		BMW 3 Series	1975–present	Over 18,000,000 to 2025.
Buick	1964 Buick LeSabre.	Buick LeSabre	1959–2005	Over 6,000,000.
Bugatti	1929 Bugatti Typ 40 Grand Sport Tourer.	Bugatti Type 40	1926–1930	Approximately 800.
BYD		BYD F3	2005–2022	1,684,904, excluding exports.
Cadillac	Cadillac De Ville.	Cadillac De Ville	1959–2005	Approximately 3,870,000 excluding early Series 62 hardtops, 1981–1988, 1991–93, and 2000–05. (Total production for those periods is unknown, but a good guess is over 1,300,000.)
Chevrolet	1965 Chevrolet Impala.	Chevrolet Impala	1958–1985; 1994–1996; 2000–2020	Over 16,500,000
Chrysler	1961 Chrysler Newport.	Chrysler Newport	1961–1981	Approximately 1,920,000 (excluding early Newport hardtops).
Citroën	First generation Citroën 2CV.	Citroën 2CV	1948–1990	3,872,583. Including commercial variants, the total figure is approximately nine million
Dacia	Dacia Sandero.	Dacia Sandero	2008–present	over 2,700,000 (includes the Stepway version).
De Tomaso	De Tomaso Pantera.	De Tomaso Pantera	1970–1991	7,260 produced over a single generation
Dodge	Dodge Coronet.	Dodge Coronet	1949–1959; 1965–1976	Approximately 2,060,000 in six generations not counting 1949–53 four-doors, 1953 coupés, Dodge Chargers and Super Bees. (Production of 1949–53 four-doors and 1953 coupés is unknown but a reasonable guess is about 400,000 total.)
Ferrari		Unknown		Ferrari doesn't publish official sales figures for many of their models.
Fiat	First generation Fiat Uno.	Fiat Uno	1983–2021	Approximately 8,800,000 worldwide to 2004. Sold over six million in Western Europe before being replaced by the Punto in 1995, while production continued in South Africa, Poland and Brazil.
Ford	1955 Ford F-100.	Ford F-Series	1948–present	Over 40,000,000. America's bestselling vehicle for 40 consecutive years; 33,900,000 in 12 generations to May 2010.
Haval		Haval H6	2012–present	3,892,260 between 2012 and 2022, excluding exports.
Hindustan	Hindustan Ambassador.	Hindustan Ambassador	1958–2014	Almost 4,000,000.
Honda	First generation Honda Civic.	Honda Civic	1972–present	Over 27,000,000 up to 2021.
Hyundai	Hyundai Elantra	Hyundai Elantra	1990–present	14,400,000 up to 2022.
Jaguar	2010 Jaguar X351.	Jaguar XJ	1968–2019	800,000 up to 2005.
Jeep	2018 Jeep Wrangler.	Jeep Wrangler	1986–present	Over 5,000,000 to 2023.
Koenigsegg	Koenigsegg Jesko	Koenigsegg Jesko	2021–present	125.
Lada/AvtoVAZ	Lada Riva 1500.	Lada Riva VAZ-2105/04/07	1980–2014	13,500,000 until exports to Europe were discontinued in 1997. Production continued in Egypt until 2014.
Lamborghini	2019 Lamborghini Urus	Lamborghini Urus	2018–present	over 20,000
Lancia	2012 Lancia Ypsilon	Lancia Ypsilon	1996–present	over 870,000 to 2005.
Land Rover		Series/Defender	1948–2016	over 2,000,000 (approx)
Lincoln	Lincoln Town Car.	Lincoln Town Car	1981–2011	Approximately 2,290,000 not counting 2005–2011. (Production of 2005–2011 is unknown, but a reasonable guess is about 160,000.)
Lotus	Lotus Elise 111S.	Lotus Elise	1996–2021	over 35,000 produced over two generations to 2021.
Maserati	Maserati GranTurismo	Maserati GranTurismo	2007–present	40,250 up to 2019
Mazda	2003 Mazda 323	Mazda Familia	1963–2003	Over 10,000,000 up to 1995.
Mercedes-Benz	Merceds-Benz C-Class.	Mercedes-Benz C-Class	1993–present	10,500,000 to February 2021.
Mitsubishi	Tenth-generation Mitsubishi Lancer.	Mitsubishi Lancer	1973–2017	Over 6,000,000 to the end of 2006. Production continues in Taiwan and China
Nissan	2020 Nissan Sentra.	Nissan Sunny/Sentra/Pulsar/Almera	1966–present	Over 15,900,000. Ten generations, and four nameplates depending on marketplace.
Opel/Vauxhall	First generation Opel Corsa, sold in the United Kingdom as a Vauxhall Nova.	Opel Corsa	1982–present	Over 18,000,000 sold worldwide in 25 years, in the four generations up to 2007. 10 million were sold only in Europe alone. The best-selling car in the world in 1998, surpassing the Toyota Corolla with 910,839 sales, at that time being produced in four continents, and was sold under five marques with five different body styles.
Perodua		Perodua Myvi	2005–present	1,400,000 since 2005 up to 2023.
Peugeot	Peugeot 206.	Peugeot 206	1998–2013	Approximately 10,000,000 to 2018 in a single generation.
Porsche		Porsche 911	1963–present	1,000,000 produced up to 2017.
Proton	Proton Saga	Proton Saga	1985–present	1,900,000 since 1985.
Renault	Fifth generation Renault Clio.	Renault Clio	1990–present	17,000,000 across five generations up to 2025.
Rolls-Royce	Rolls Royce Silver Shadow	Rolls-Royce Silver Shadow	1965–1980	29,030 produced over a single generation.
SEAT	SEAT Ibiza Mk5 (2026).	SEAT Ibiza	1984–present	3,949,597 up to 2008. The sales of the fourth generation of the SEAT Ibiza, as well as those of its derivatives (such as the SEAT Córdoba and the SEAT Inca, or the rebadged versions) are not included in the figures.
Smart	2004 Smart Fortwo	Smart Fortwo	1998–2024	Over 1,700,000 by early 2015.
Subaru	Third generation Subaru Legacy.	Subaru Legacy	1988–2025	Over 3,600,000 to 2008.
Škoda	Škoda Octavia 1st generation after facelift	Škoda Octavia	1996–present	Over 6,000,000 to 2016.
Toyota	A 1976 Toyota Corolla.	Toyota Corolla	1966–present	50,000,000 up to 2021
Tesla	Tesla Model Y	Tesla Model Y	2020–present	2,160,000 up to December 2023
Volkswagen	Mk.1 Volkswagen Golf.	Volkswagen Golf	1974–present	37,000,000 across seven generations by 2023. Became Volkswagen's bestseller in 2002.
Volvo	Volvo 240 sedan.	Volvo 200 Series	1974–1993	2,862,573 saloon, estate and coupé models over a spell of 19 years.
ZAZ	Zaporozhets.	Zaporozhets	1960–1994	3,422,444.

=== Defunct brands ===
Brand	Image	Automobile	Production	Units sold & notes
American Motors	AMC Hornet.	AMC Hornet	1970–1977	Approximately 860,000.
Autobianchi	1973 Autobianchi A112 E.	Autobianchi A112	1969–1986	1,254,178.
Checker	Checker Marathon.	Checker Marathon	1961–1982	10,559 not counting taxicabs and private sales for 1961–63, 1976 and 1980–82 (private sales for 1961–62, 1976 and 1980–82 are unknown).
Continental	Continental Mark II.	Continental Mark II	1956–1957	3,012 (only car produced by the short lived Continental division of the Ford Motor Company).
Crosley	1948 Crosley.	Crosley	1939–1942; 1946–1949	62,210 before introduction of series names in 1950 (does not include 1949 Hot Shot).
DeSoto	Dodge DeSoto Custom.	DeSoto Custom	1939–1942; 1946–1952	Approximately 570,000.
Eagle	Eagle Talon.	Eagle Talon	1990–1998	Approximately 200,000.
Edsel	1959 Edsel Ranger.	Edsel Ranger	1958–1960	50,803.
Excalibur	Excalibur Series II.	Excalibur Series II	1970–1982	2,230.
Facel	1961 Facel Vega Facellia	Facellia	1960–1964	1,500
Frazer	1948 Frazer Standard	Frazer Standard	1947–1951	Approximately 90,000.
FSO		FSO 125p	1967–1991	1,445,699
Henry J	1951 Henry J.	Henry J Deluxe	1951–1954	43,400.
Holden	Holden Commodore (VE).	Holden Commodore	1978–2019	3,130,000 to 2013.
Hudson	Hudson Super.	Hudson Super Six	1916–1928; 1933; 1940–1942; 1946–1951	Approximately 600,000 not counting 1916–17 and 1940–42. (Production for 1916–17 and 1940–42 is unknown but a reasonable guess is about 80,000.)
Imperial	1957 Imperial Crown 4-door	Imperial Crown	1957–1970	Approximately 127,000.
Kaiser	Kaiser Deluxe	Kaiser Deluxe	1949–1953	Approximately 130,000.
Mercury	1994-1997 Mercury Cougar XR7	Mercury Cougar	1967–1997 1999–2002	2,972,784, excludes Ford Cougar sold in Europe and Australia.
Messerschmitt	1955 Messerschmitt KR200.	Messerschmitt KR200	1955–1964	30,286
Metropolitan	1959 Metropolitan	Metropolitan	1958–1961	55,215 as a separate marque under AMC.
Nash	Nash Statesman.	Nash Statesman	1950–1956	Approximately 340,000.
Oldsmobile	Image:1971 Oldsmobile Cutlass Supreme convertible.	Oldsmobile Cutlass Supreme	1961–1999	11,900,000 across several platforms and generations.
Packard	Packard Eight.	Packard Eight	1933–1936; 1938; 1942; 1948–1950	Approximately 250,000.
Peel	1965 Peel Trident.	Peel Trident	1965–1966	82 in a single generation.
Plymouth		Plymouth Fury	1959–1978	Approximately 3,680,000 (counting VIPs, but not counting 1959 and 1962 Sport Furys and 1975–77 Gran Furys).
Pontiac	2005 Pontiac Grand Am.	Pontiac Grand Am	1973–1975, 1978–1980, 1985–2005	Over 4,000,000.
Rambler	Rambler Classic.	Rambler Classic	1961–1966	Approximately 1,460,000 (including those produced in 1966 under AMC).
Saab	Saab 900	Saab 900	1978–1993	908,810. in the first generation.
Saturn	Saturn SL	Saturn S-Series	1991–2002	Approximately 2,210,000 not counting 2002 (sales of 2002 are unknown).
Simca	Simca 1100.	Simca 1100	1967–1982	2,139,400, figures include a small number of complete knock down (CKD) kits and commercial versions.
Studebaker	Studebaker Champion.	Studebaker Champion	1939–1942; 1946–1958	Approximately 1,320,000.
Trabant	1988 Trabant P601S.	Trabant 601	1957–1991	Over 3,000,000.
Willys	1936 Willys 77.	Willys 77	1933–1936	Approximately 68,000.
Zastava	Zastava 101.	Zastava 101	1971–2008	1,045,458

== Class bestsellers ==
Class	Image	Automobile	Production	Units sold	Notes
All-electric car	Tesla Model 3.	Tesla Model Y	2020–present	2,160,000 up to December 2023	Became the first electric vehicle to be the world's bestselling car in 2023.
Full-size car	1958 Chevrolet Impala.	Chevrolet Impala	1958–1985; 1994–1996; 2000–2020	Over 13,000,000 between its introduction and 1996.	The bestselling car in America in a single year, with 1,046,514 sold in 1965 including the Impala SS.
Hybrid electric vehicle	2017 Toyota Prius	Toyota Prius	1997–present	5,000,000 in four generations up to September 2022. Combined sales of the Prius family nameplate totaled over 6,000,000 units in January 2017.	The world's all-time best selling hybrid electric vehicle.
Hydrogen fuel cell car	Toyota Mirai	Toyota Mirai	2015–present	26,260 units sold by early 2024 in the United States, Japan, some European markets and the United Arab Emirates.	
Pickup truck	Ford F-150 SVT Lightning.	Ford F-Series	1948–present	Over 42,000,000 America's bestselling vehicle for 28 consecutive years; 33,900,000 in 12 generations to May 2010.	World's bestselling truck for 43 consecutive years.
Plug-in hybrid	Mitsubishi Outlander P-HEV.	BYD Song DM SUV series	2017–present	Over 1,050,000 in December 2023 since inception.	The world's all-time best-selling plug-in hybrid car. It surpassed the Mitsubishi Outlander PHEV in 2021.
Full-size luxury car	Cadillac De Ville.	Cadillac De Ville	1959–2005	Approximately 3,870,000 excluding early Series 62 hardtops, 1981–1988, 1991–93, and 2000–05. (Total production for 1981–1988, 1991–93 and 2000–05 is unknown but a good guess is over 1,300,000.)	
Rotary engined car	A third-generation Mazda RX-7.	Mazda RX-7	1978–2002	811,634 in three generations to 2005.	
Single-cylinder car	BMW Isetta.	Iso/BMW/VELAM/Romi Isetta	1953–1961	161,728 in all variations	
Four-seat sports car (Pony car)	First 1964 1/2 Ford Mustang	Ford Mustang	1964–present	10,000,000 in six generations up to 2018.	
Two-seat coupe Sports car		Nissan Z-car	1969–1999; 2003–present	1,535,000 in five generations up to 2005.	
Two-seat convertible sports car		Mazda MX-5	1989–present	Over 940,000 in the first two generations to June 2014.	Verified by the Guinness Book of Records as the bestselling two-seater, convertible (open top) sports car in history.
Van		Volkswagen Type 2 (Transporter)	1950–present	Over 12,000,000 in six generations to August 2015	Best-selling van nameplate of all time. Second-generation T2 sold for 46 years (1967–2013), longest production run of any van and second-longest production of any Volkswagen (except for Type 1 Beetle).

== Fastest-selling ==
Class	Image	Automobile	Production	Units sold	Notes
Any car	Baojun 510	Baojun 510	2017–2025	416,883 sold in its first 12 months in the market.	February 2017 – January 2018
Any car	Baojun 510	Ford Fairmont	1977–1983	Previous record holder, 405,780 sold in its first 12 months in the market.	1978
All-electric car	Baojun 510	BYD Seagull	2023–present	364,986 sold in its first 12 months in the market.	April 2023 – March 2024
All-electric car	Baojun 510	Wuling Hongguang Mini EV	2020–present	Previous record holder, 328,929 sold in its first 12 months in the market.	August 2020 – July 2021

== See also ==
- List of automobile sales by model
- Automotive industry
- List of automotive superlatives
