= RS3 =

RS3 or RS-3 may refer to:

== Vehicles ==
=== Automobiles ===
- Audi RS3, a 2011–present German compact performance car
- Baojun RS-3, a 2019–present Chinese subcompact SUV

=== Other ===
- RS3 (sail), a windsurfing sail
- ALCO RS-3, diesel locomotive built by American Locomotive Company and Montreal Locomotive Works
- Aprilia RS Cube, also known as the RS^{3}, a 2002–2004 Italian MotoGP race bike

== Video games ==
- Racing Simulation 3, a 2002 racing video game
- Romancing SaGa 3, a 1995 role-playing video game
- RuneScape 3, a 2013 fantasy massively multiplayer online role-playing video game

== Other uses ==
- Resistant starch RS3, a prebiotic starch formed when starch-containing foods are cooked and cooled
