= Wuling Xingchi =

Chinese subcompact crossover SUV

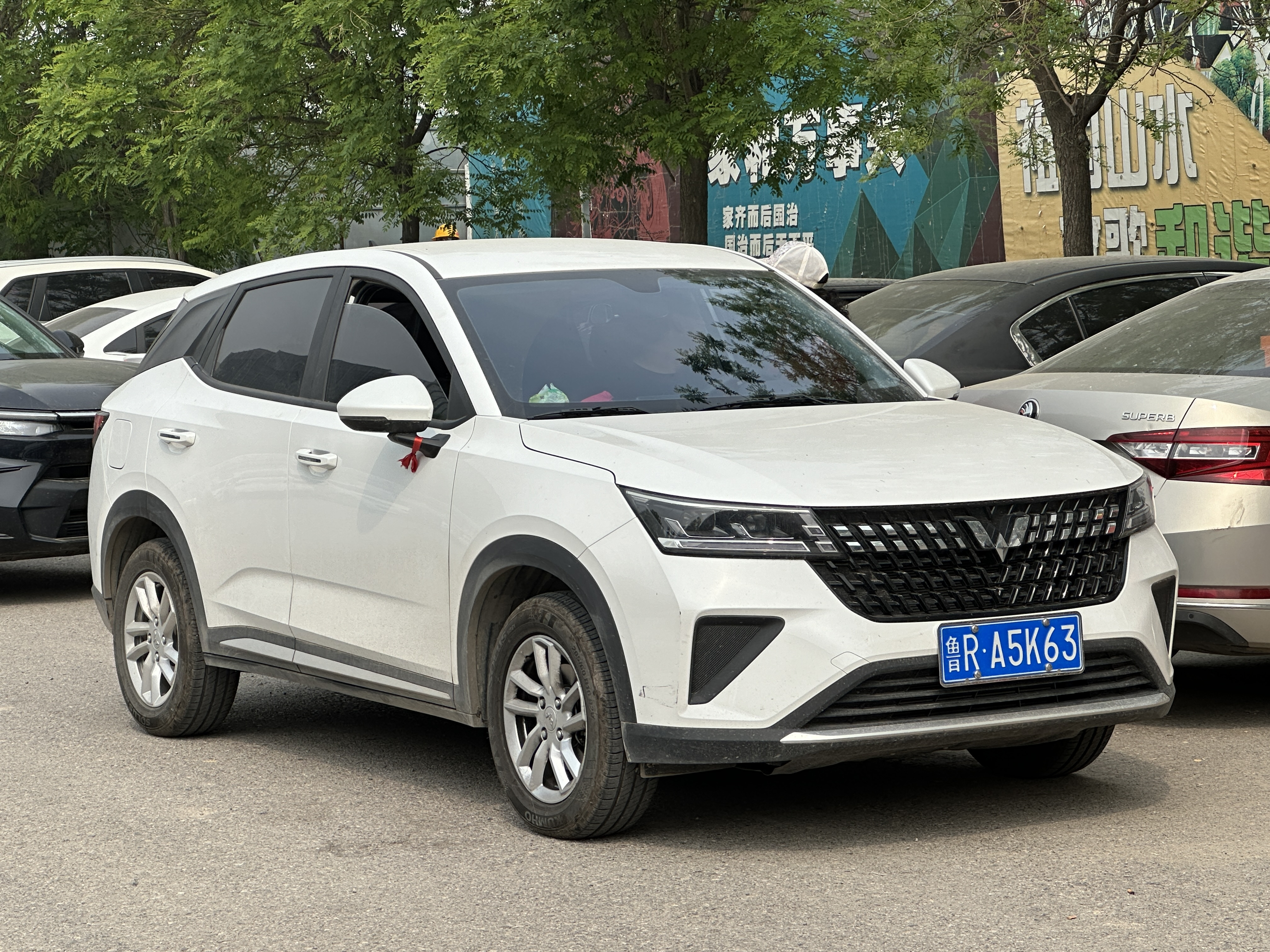

Overview
- Manufacturer: SAIC-GM-Wuling
- Model code: 310S
- Also called: Wuling Alvez (Indonesia and Brunei); Chevrolet Groove (Middle East, Latin America and Philippines)
- Production: September 2022 – present
- Assembly: China: Liuzhou, Guangxi; Indonesia: Cikarang, West Java (SGMW Indonesia)

Body and chassis
- Class: Subcompact crossover SUV
- Body style: 5-door SUV
- Layout: Front-engine, front-wheel-drive
- Related: Chevrolet Aveo (310C); Baojun RS-3; Baojun 510

Powertrain
- Engine: Petrol: 1.5 L LAR I4; 1.5 L LJO turbo I4
- Power output: 73 kW (98 hp; 99 PS) (LAR, China); 77 kW (103 hp; 105 PS) (LAR, Indonesia); 108 kW (145 hp; 147 PS) (LJO)
- Transmission: 6-speed manual; CVT

Dimensions
- Wheelbase: 2,550 mm (100.4 in)
- Length: 4,350–4,365 mm (171.3–171.9 in)
- Width: 1,750 mm (68.9 in)
- Height: 1,610–1,640 mm (63.4–64.6 in)
- Curb weight: 1,190–1,320 kg (2,624–2,910 lb)

Chronology
- Predecessor: Baojun 510 / Chevrolet Groove (first generation); Baojun RS-3; Chevrolet Tracker (Philippines)

The Wuling Xingchi (Chinese: 五菱星驰) is a subcompact crossover SUV produced by SAIC-GM-Wuling through the Wuling brand. It was introduced in September 2022 as the smallest SUV model of the brand under the Asta/Xingchen.

== Overview ==
The Wuling Xingchi is the fourth model that is equipped Wuling's global silver badge, the Xingchi small crossover inherits the brand's "dynamic wing" design DNA. It is offered in six trim levels in China.

The interior of the Wuling Xingchi is equipped with a 10.25-inch floating central control screen and a 3.5-inch instrument panel. The central control screen comes with the Ling OS System and supports functions including voice interaction, remote control, and OTA update.

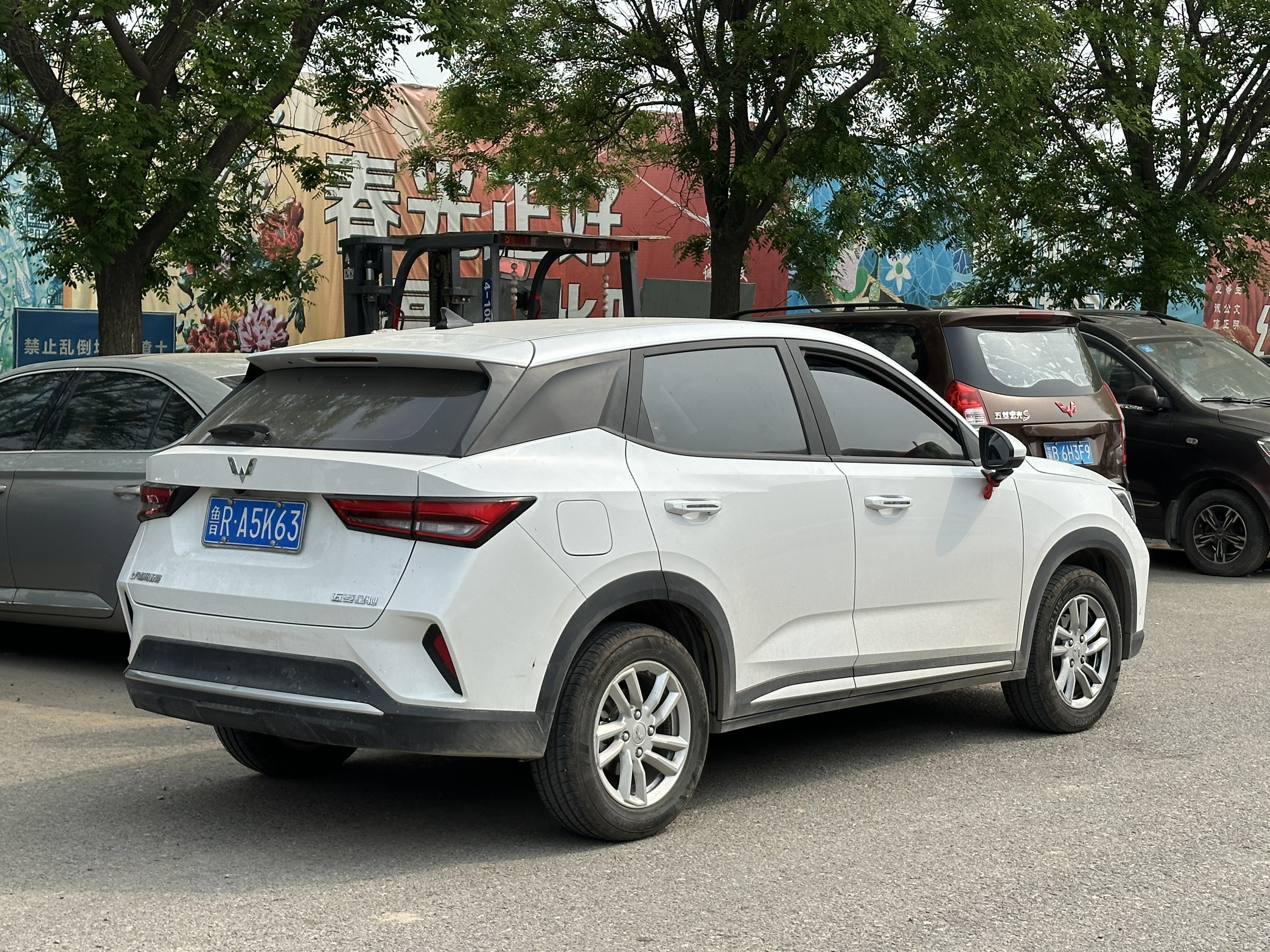
Rear view

== Powertrain ==
The Xingchi has two engine options with a 1.5-litre naturally aspirated petrol engine producing a maximum power of 73 kW (98 hp; 99 PS) and fuel consumption of 6.43 L/100 km (15.6 km/L; 43.9 mpg_{‑imp}; 36.6 mpg_{‑US}) paired with a manual transmission or a CVT. A 1.5-litre turbocharged engine with a maximum power of 108 kW (145 hp; 147 PS) and peak torque of 250 N⋅m (25 kg⋅m; 184 lb⋅ft). The 0 to 100 km/h (0 to 62 mph) acceleration time is 8.7 seconds.

== Overseas markets ==
=== Wuling Alvez ===
In Indonesia, the Xingchi is sold as the Wuling Alvez, which was launched on 16 February 2023 at the 30th Indonesia International Motor Show. The Alvez is available in SE, CE and EX grade levels. The SE grade is available with 6-speed manual transmission, while the CE and EX grades are available with CVT.

According to SGMW Motor Indonesia, Wuling's Indonesian subsidiary, the name Alvez is coined from the phrase "all at once".

The Alvez was launched in Brunei on 22 March 2024, in the sole variant. The Alvez in Bruneian market was received a facelift on 22 May 2026.

The facelifted Alvez was launched on 21 November 2025 at the 2025 Gaikindo Jakarta Auto Week. The facelift saw updated front fascia with a new grille, new exterior colours, a new 10.25-inch touchscreen infotainment system, and additional features for the Advanced driver-assistance systems (ADAS) safety package. For the facelift model, it is available with three variants: CE M/T, CE CVT and EX CVT.

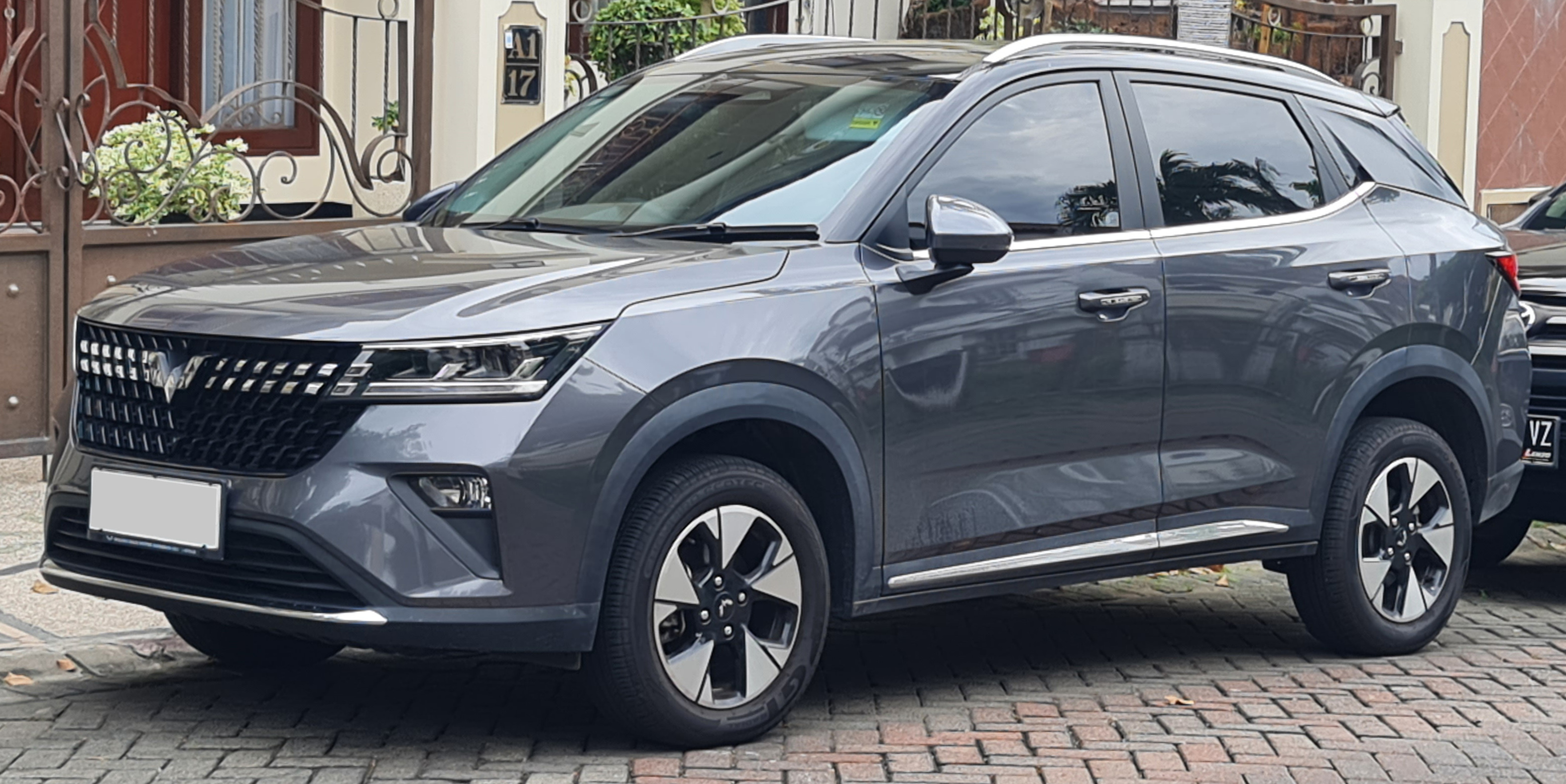
Wuling Alvez (Indonesia)

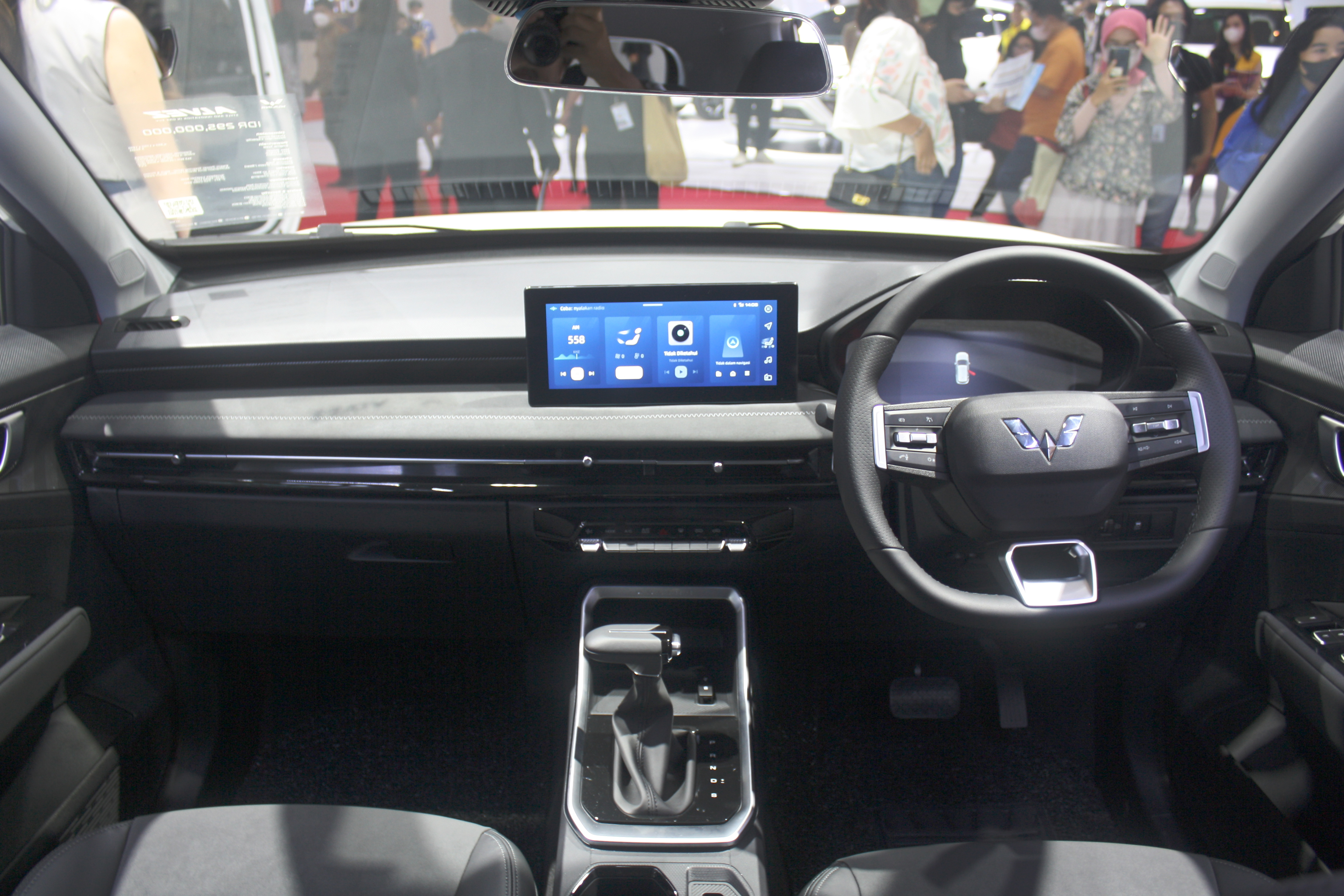
Alvez interior

=== Chevrolet Groove ===
The Xingchi was rebadged as the second-generation Chevrolet Groove and unveiled on 26 June 2025. It replaced the first-generation Groove, which is a rebadged Baojun 510 for the Middle Eastern and Latin American markets. It was also launched in the Philippines on 30 July 2025, where it replaced the Chevrolet Tracker. In early 2026, the Groove also entered into the Cambodian market, expanding Chevrolet's regional presence. Production of the Groove and Aveo in Mexico started in 2026.

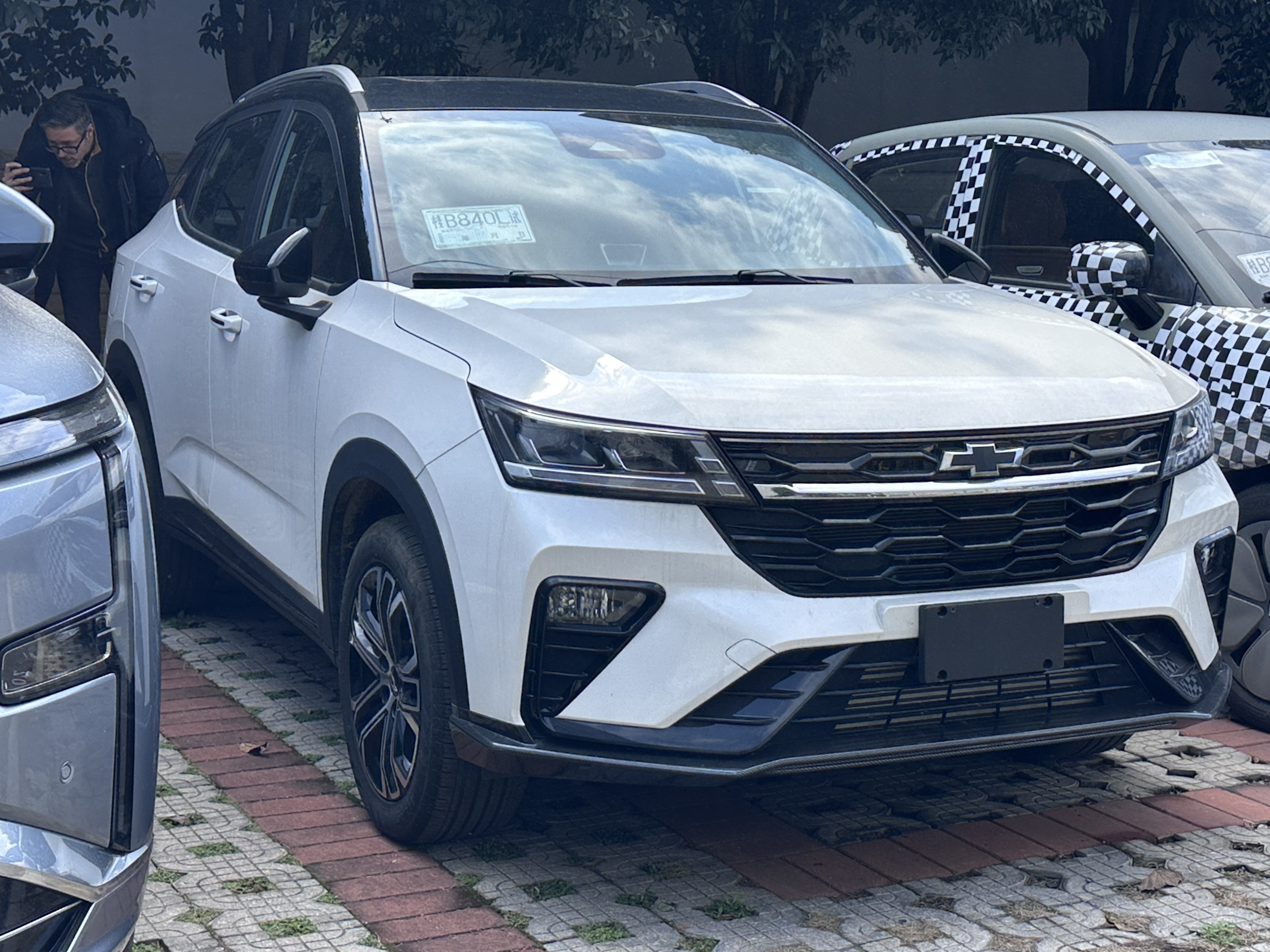
Second generation Chevrolet Groove (Philippines)

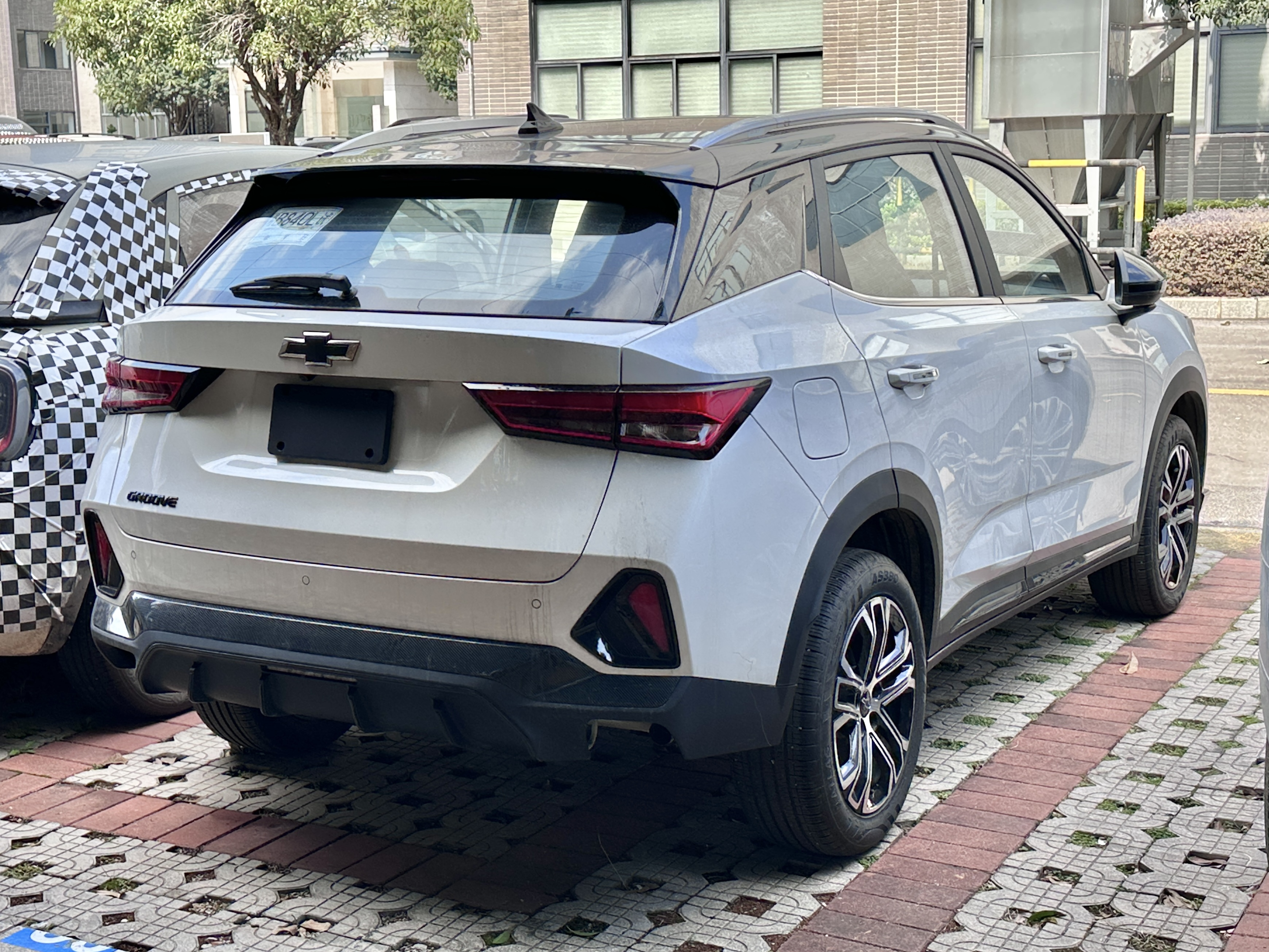
Rear view

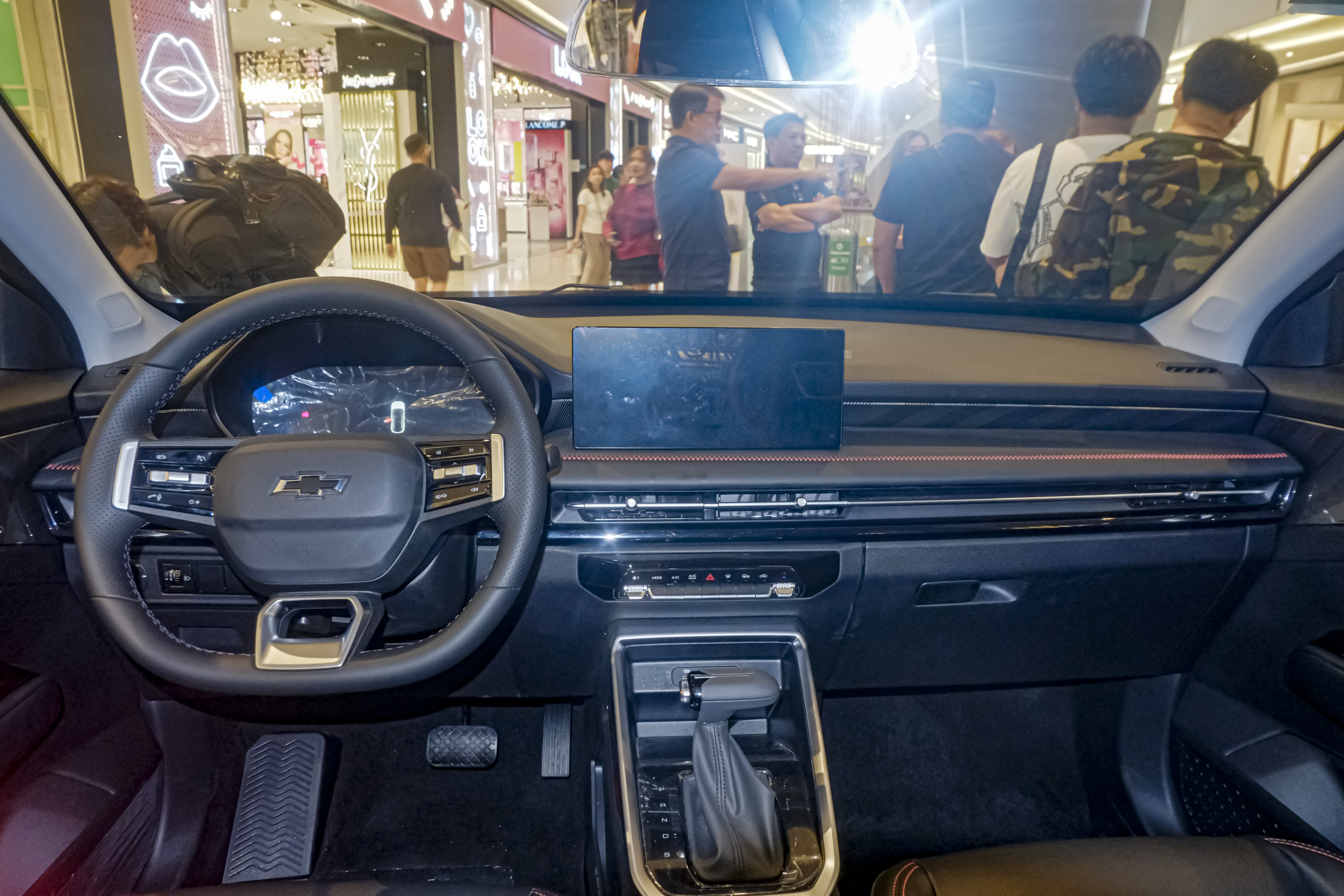
Interior

== Sales ==
Year	China	Indonesia
2022	10,005	—
2023	42,432	5,923
2024	23,699	2,768
2025	8,503	1,522
