= Chevrolet Groove =

Subcompact crossover SUV

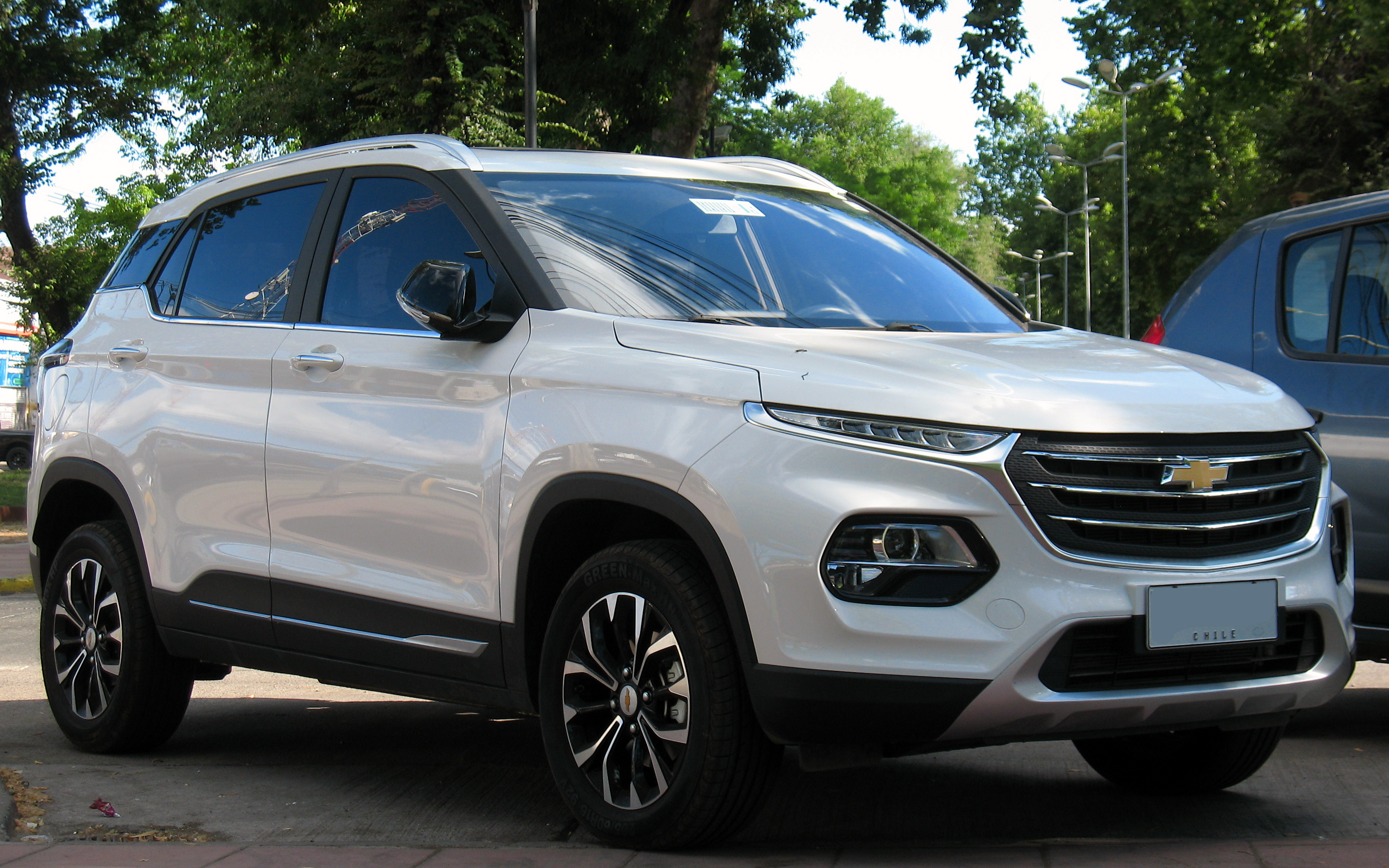
- Chevrolet Groove Premier

Overview
- Manufacturer: SAIC-GM-Wuling
- Production: May 2020 – present

Body and chassis
- Class: Subcompact crossover SUV
- Body style: 5-door SUV

The Chevrolet Groove is a subcompact crossover SUV produced by SAIC-GM-Wuling under the Chevrolet brand. The first-generation model is a rebadged model of Baojun 510, while the second-generation model is a rebadged model of Wuling Xingchi. It is available in Middle East and the Latin American markets.

== First generation (CN180S; 2020) ==
In May 2020, SAIC-GM-Wuling started exporting the Baojun 510 to Latin America and the Middle East with the Chevrolet Groove nameplate.

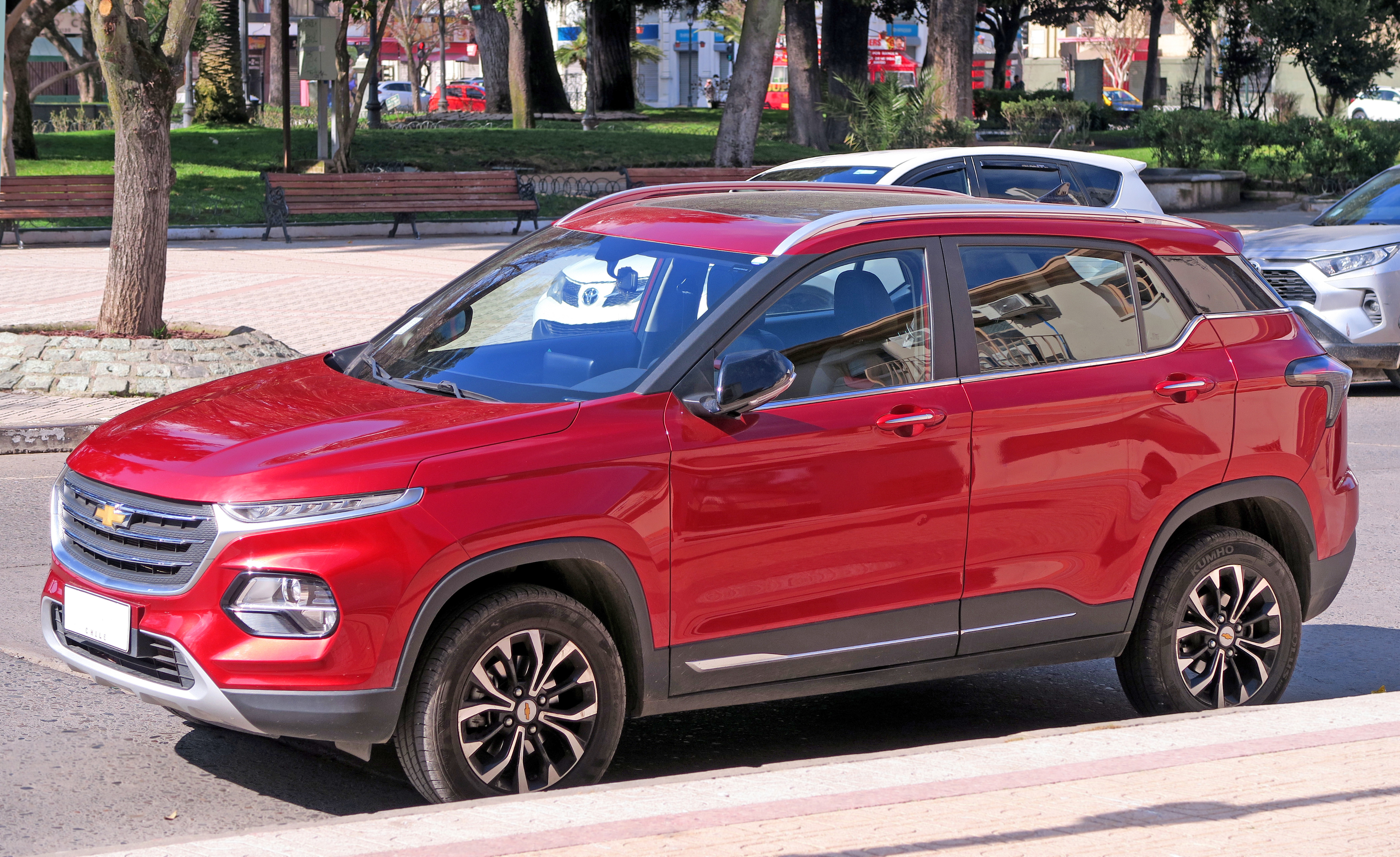
2024 Groove 1.5 Premier (Chile)

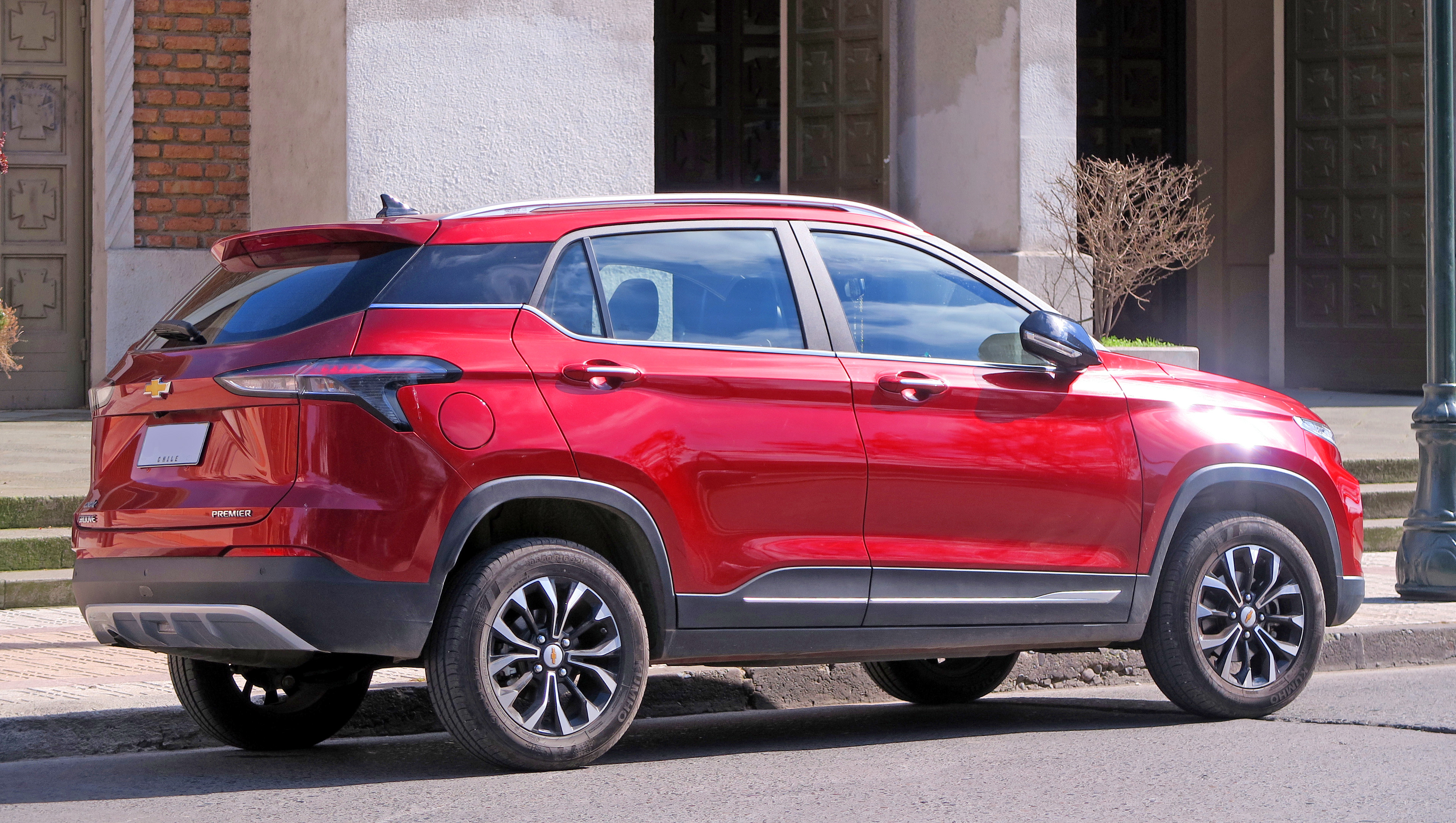
Rear view

=== Safety ===
==== Latin NCAP ====
The Groove in its most basic Latin American configuration obtained 0 stars from Latin NCAP 3.0 in 2024 (similar to Euro NCAP 2014).

Latin NCAP 3.5 test results Chevrolet Groove + 4 Airbags (2024, similar to Euro NCAP 2017)
Test	Points	%
Overall:	0 /5 stars	
Adult occupant:	15.77	39%
Child occupant:	36.60	69%
Pedestrian:	17.46	36%
Safety assist:	25.00	58%

== Second generation (310S; 2025) ==
The second generation Groove was unveiled on 26 June 2025 as a rebadged Wuling Xingchi for Middle East and Latin America. It is available in two trim levels; LT and RS trims. It went on sale in Mexico on 23 July 2025 and the Middle East on 1 October 2025.

It was also launched in the Philippines a week later in a single RS trim, replacing the Tracker.

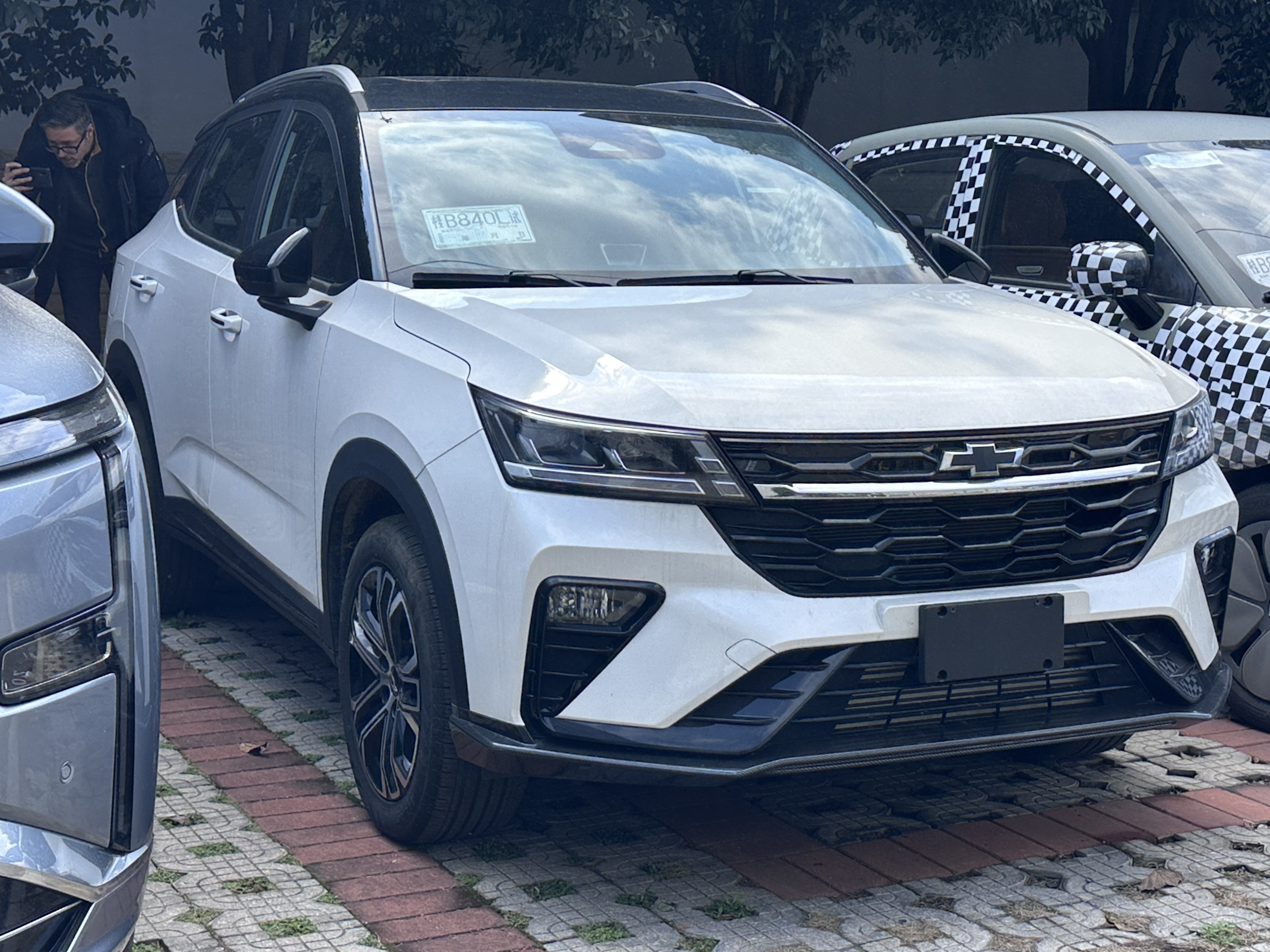
Chevrolet Groove II

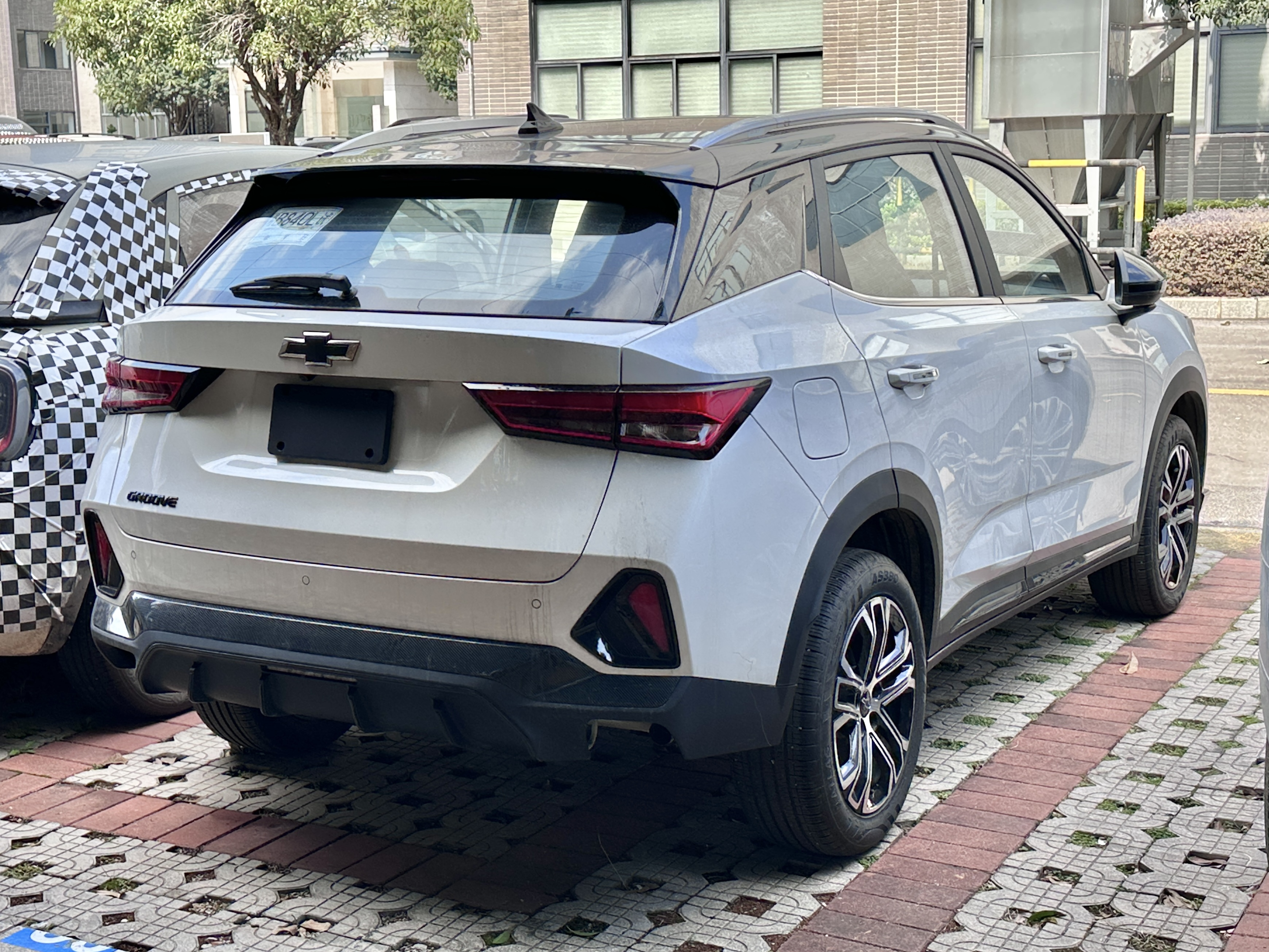
Rear view

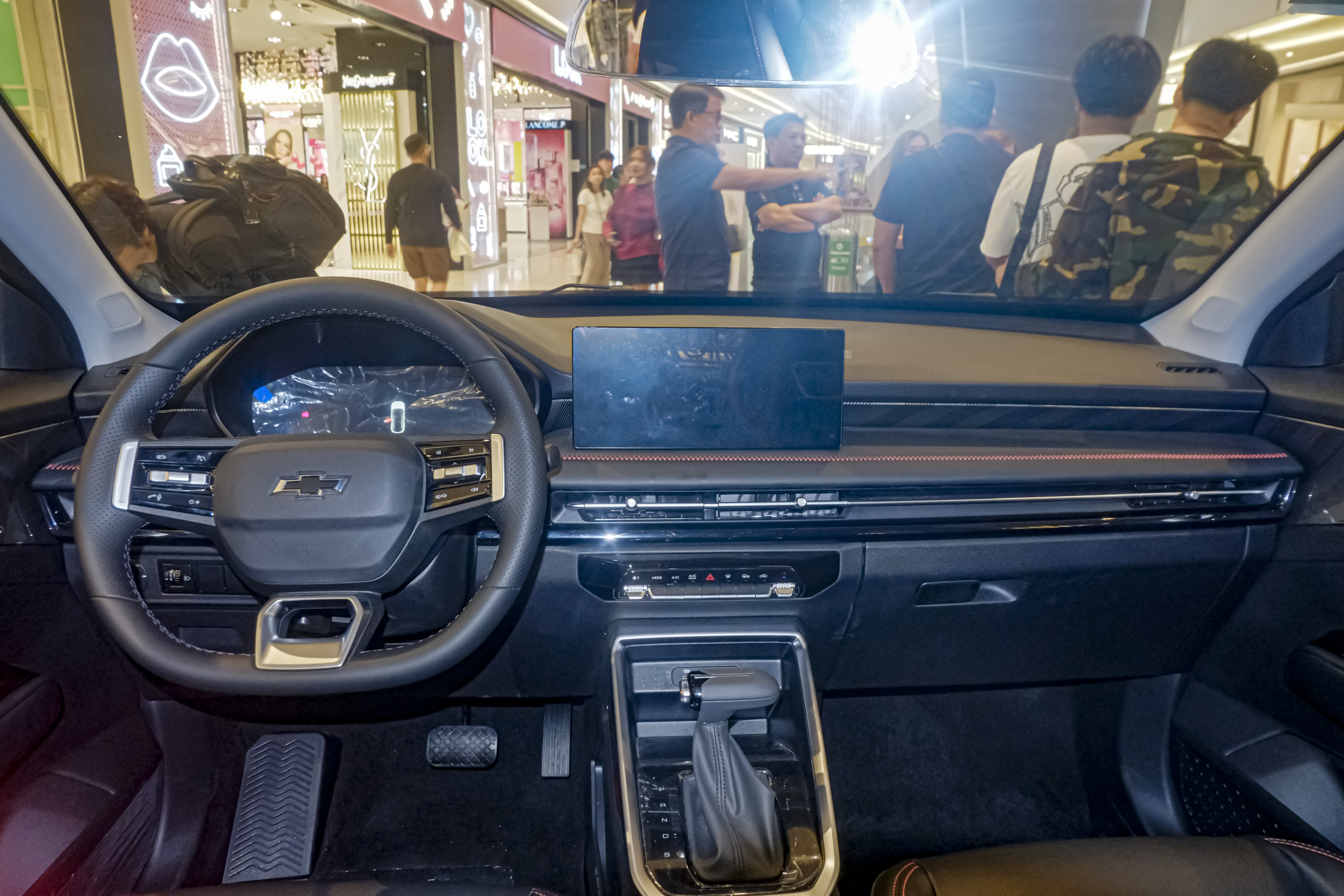
Interior

== Concept car (2007) ==
Chevrolet Groove (concept)
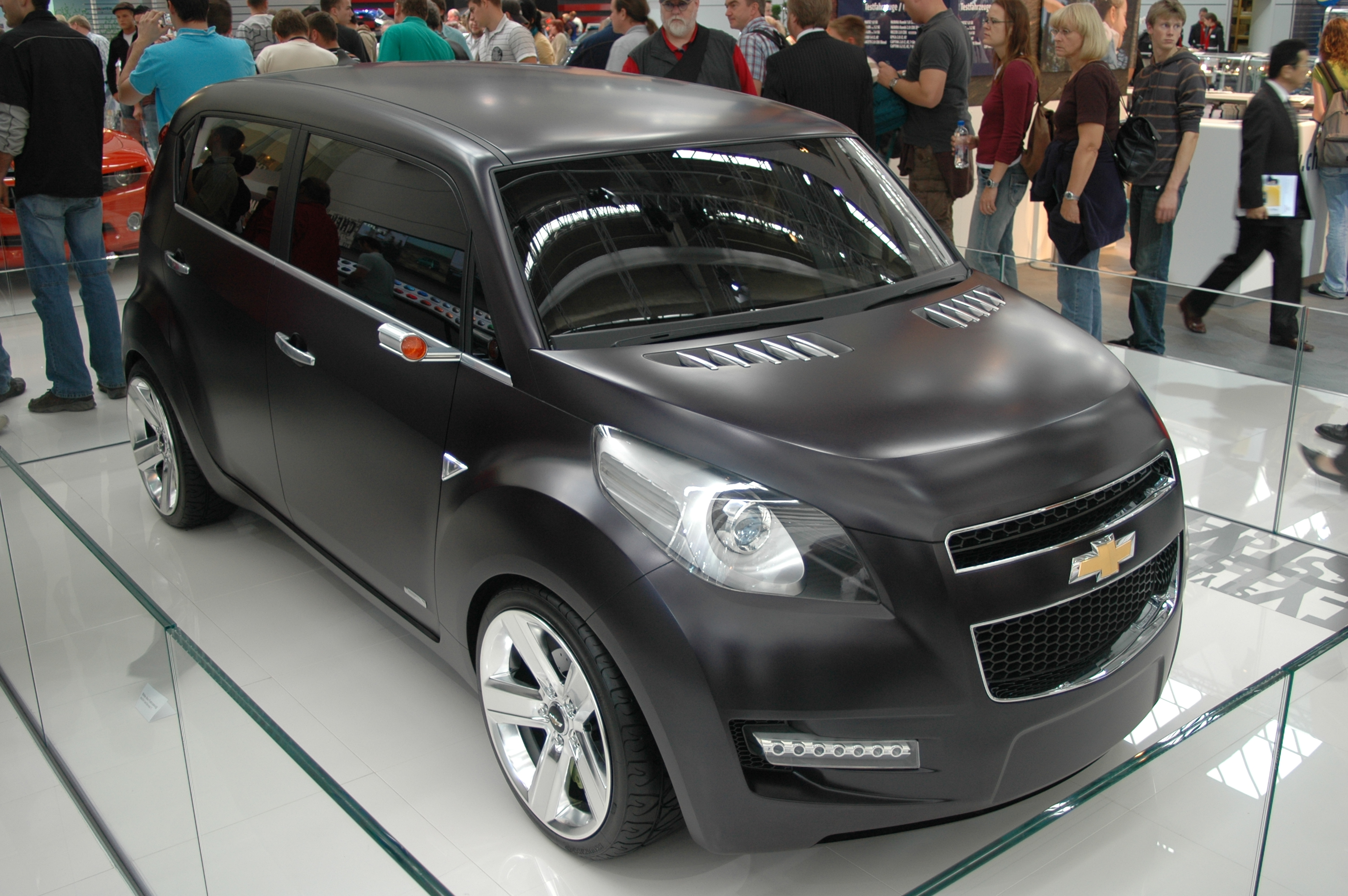

Overview
- Manufacturer: General Motors
- Designer: Ja-wook Koo

Body and chassis
- Class: Concept subcompact car
- Body style: 5-door wagon
- Layout: FWD
- Related: Chevrolet Beat; Chevrolet Trax; Daewoo Kalos; Daewoo Matiz; GMC Granite

Powertrain
- Engine: 1.0 L diesel

Dimensions
- Wheelbase: 2550 mm

The Chevrolet Groove is one of three small car concepts introduced on 4 April 2007 at the New York International Auto Show.

The Groove showcases a new style of small car from General Motors. The mini car was completely designed by GM Daewoo in South Korea. The Groove is powered by a 1.0 L diesel engine that is similar to the one powering the current Chevy Spark, a minicar sold in Asia.

The Chevrolet Beat and the Chevrolet Trax were also showcased to provide a vision for future designs in the GM subcompact segment. These three concepts could be voted on after their introduction on a special website. In the end, both the Groove and Trax lost to the Beat, which is slated for production.

Both Beat and Trax were eventually green-lit for production. While the Groove was not, design language from it has found its way into the Chevrolet Sonic and Chevrolet Orlando designs.
