= Chevrolet Trax (concept car) =

Chevrolet Trax Concept
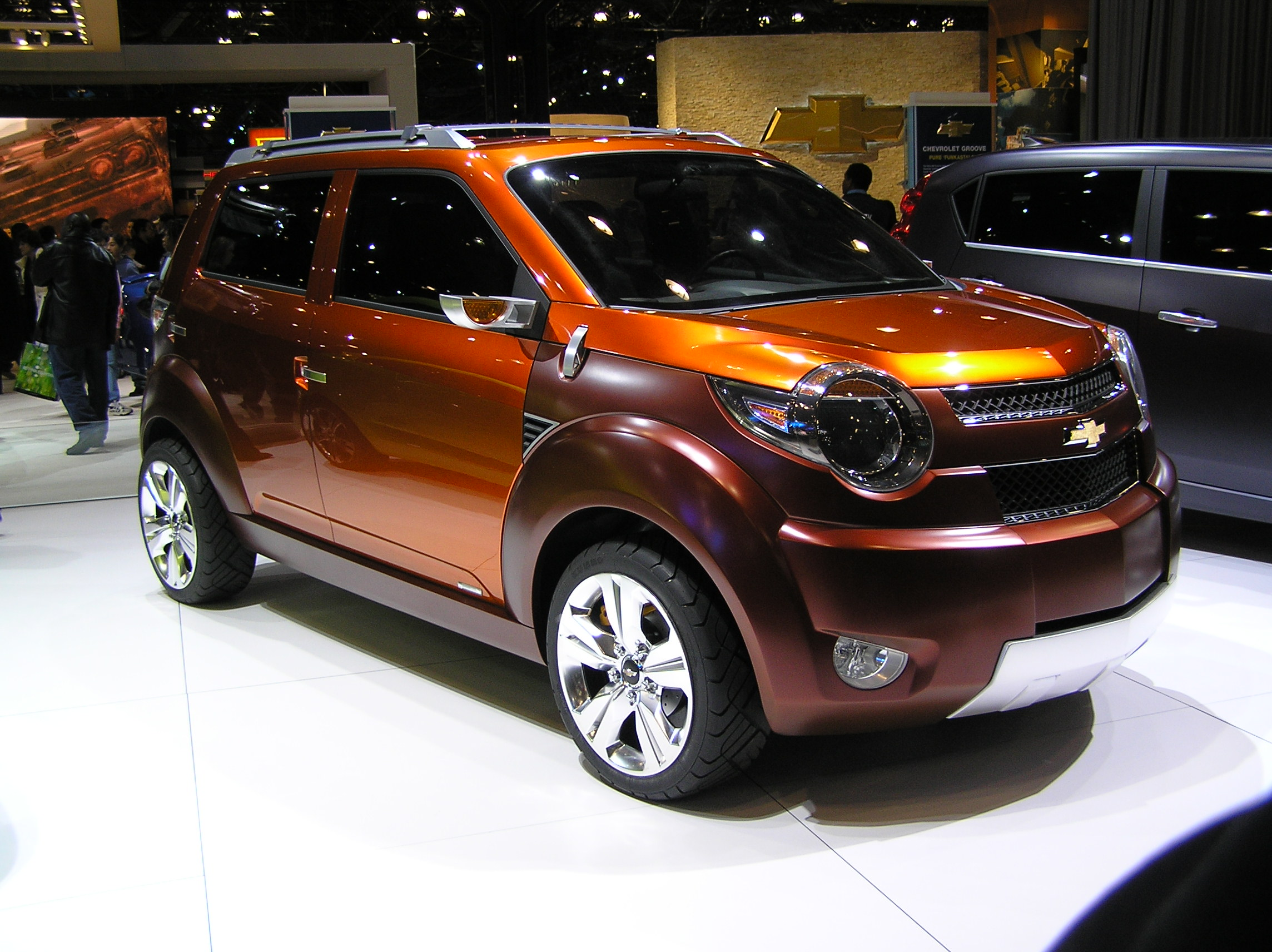

Overview
- Manufacturer: GM Korea

Body and chassis
- Class: Subcompact
- Body style: 5-door hatchback concept car
- Layout: Front engine, front-wheel drive / four-wheel drive
- Related: Chevrolet Beat; Chevrolet Groove; Daewoo Kalos; Daewoo Matiz

Powertrain
- Engine: 1.0 L I3
- Transmission: 3-speed manual

The Chevrolet Trax Concept was one of the three small car concepts introduced at the 2007 New York International Auto Show. The Trax showcased a new style of small car from General Motors with a two-tone exterior. The mini car was completely designed by GM Daewoo in South Korea. The small hood housed a 1.0 L gas engine with a top speed of 105 mph (169 km/h).

== Features ==
General Motors emphasizes that the Trax, Groove and Beat were created by its design studios in South Korea, a hotbed of minicar design and home to Daewoo, which supplies the Aveo and would furnish the Trax, too. Trax is a tall four-door wagon with a 1.0-liter three-cylinder engine. It looks like a micro SUV, which Chevy thinks will enhance its sporty-lifestyle appeal. In fact, Chevy says Trax aims at "active urban city dwellers who like to go off-road on the weekends." To that end, Trax could offer both front- and all-wheel drive, though it doesn't have elevated ground clearance.

== Showcase ==
The Trax, Groove and Beat were showcased to provide a vision for future designs in the GM subcompact segment. These three concepts were voted on after their introduction on the website www.vote4chevrolet.com. In the end, both the Trax and Groove lost to the Beat, which is slated for production.

== In popular culture ==
The Chevrolet Trax was used as the vehicle mode for Mudflap in the 2009 film Transformers: Revenge of the Fallen.
