= Baojun 510 =

Subcompact crossover SUV

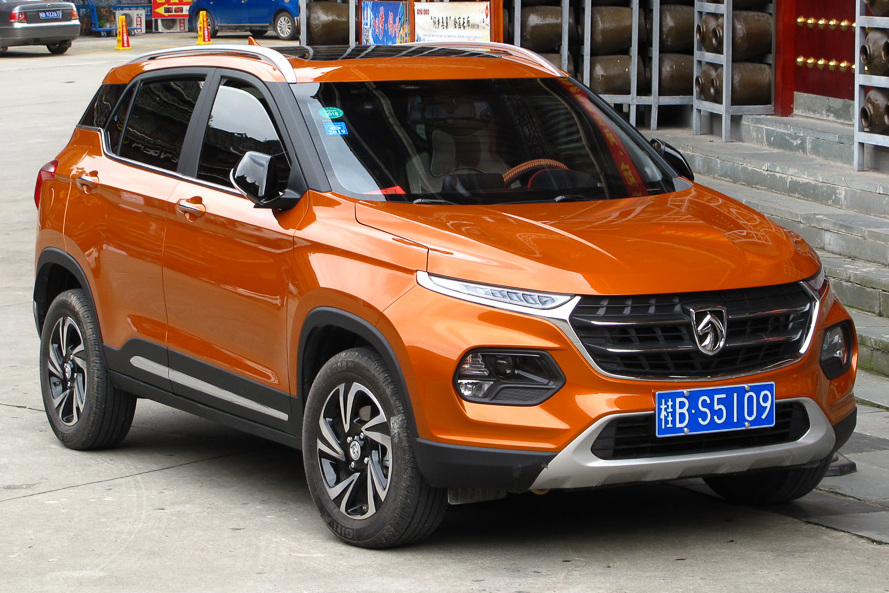

Overview
- Manufacturer: SAIC-GM-Wuling
- Model code: CN180S
- Also called: Chevrolet Groove (Middle East and Latin America)
- Production: January 2017 – September 2025
- Assembly: China: Liuzhou, Guangxi
- Designer: Zhou Fang

Body and chassis
- Class: Subcompact crossover SUV
- Body style: 5-door SUV
- Layout: Front-engine, front-wheel-drive
- Related: Baojun RS-3; Wuling Xingchi

Powertrain
- Engine: Petrol: 1.5 L L2B I4
- Transmission: 6-speed manual; 5-speed automatic; CVT

Dimensions
- Wheelbase: 2,550 mm (100.4 in)
- Length: 4,220 mm (166.1 in)
- Width: 1,740 mm (68.5 in)
- Height: 1,615–1,625 mm (63.6–64.0 in)
- Kerb weight: 1,206–1,290 kg (2,659–2,844 lb)

Chronology
- Successor: Baojun RS-3; Chevrolet Groove (second generation)

The Baojun 510 (Chinese: 宝骏510; pinyin: Bǎojùn 510) is a subcompact crossover SUV produced by SAIC-GM-Wuling through the Baojun brand.

== Overview ==
The 510 debuted at the 2016 Guangzhou Auto Show with the official Chinese market launch in 2017. The car is positioned under the 530/560 compact crossover at the time.

It was the best-selling crossover in China in 2018, and also the best-selling car sold by Baojun. As of June 2019, nearly 800,000 units of 510 had been sold. It is also notable for being the highest-selling new car nameplate in world's history. It recorded 416,883 sales during its first 12 months in market, the highest of any other car in the world. It took the record from the Baojun 560 which was sold 319,536 units in a 12-month period.

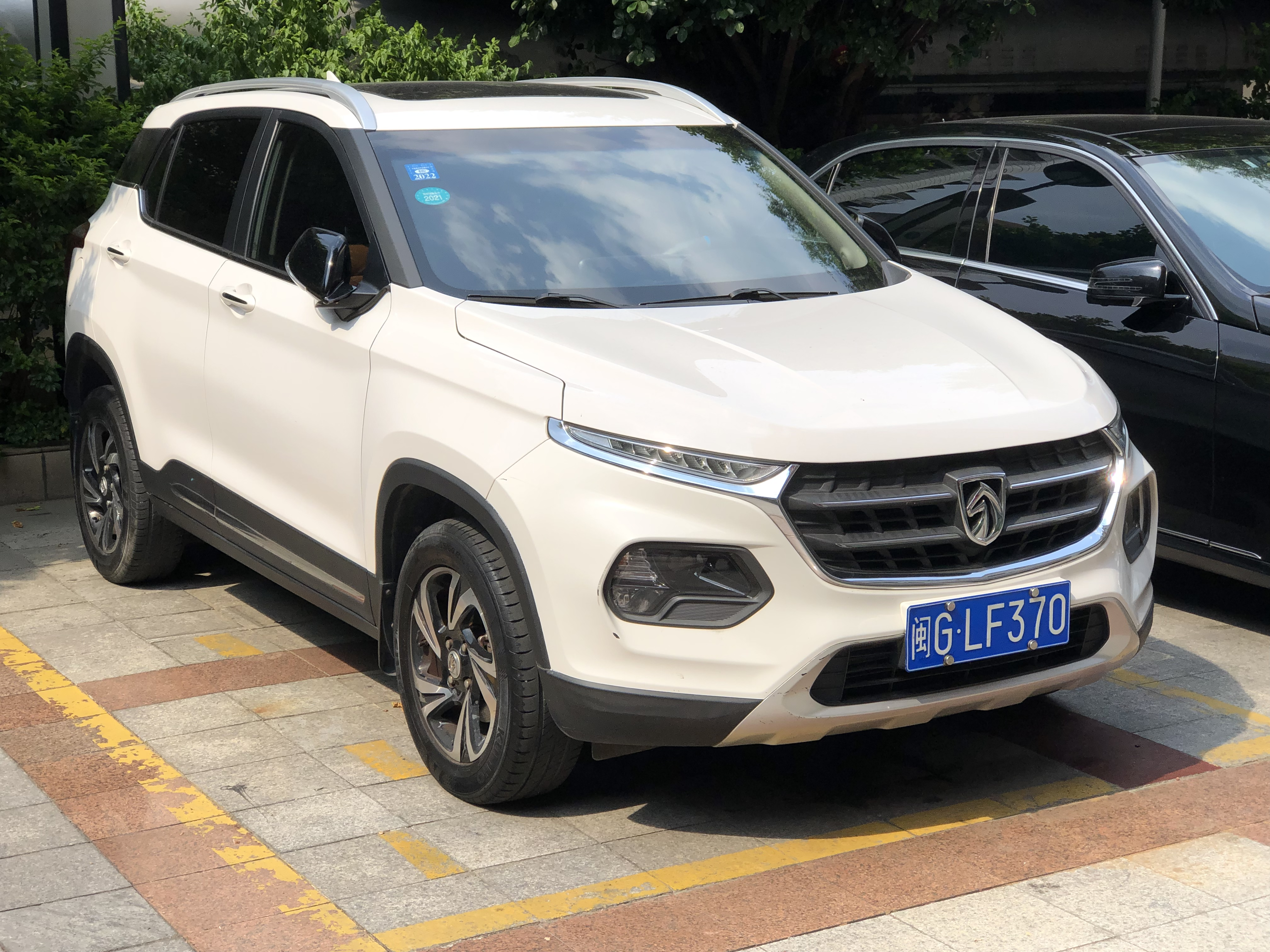
Front view (pre-facelift)

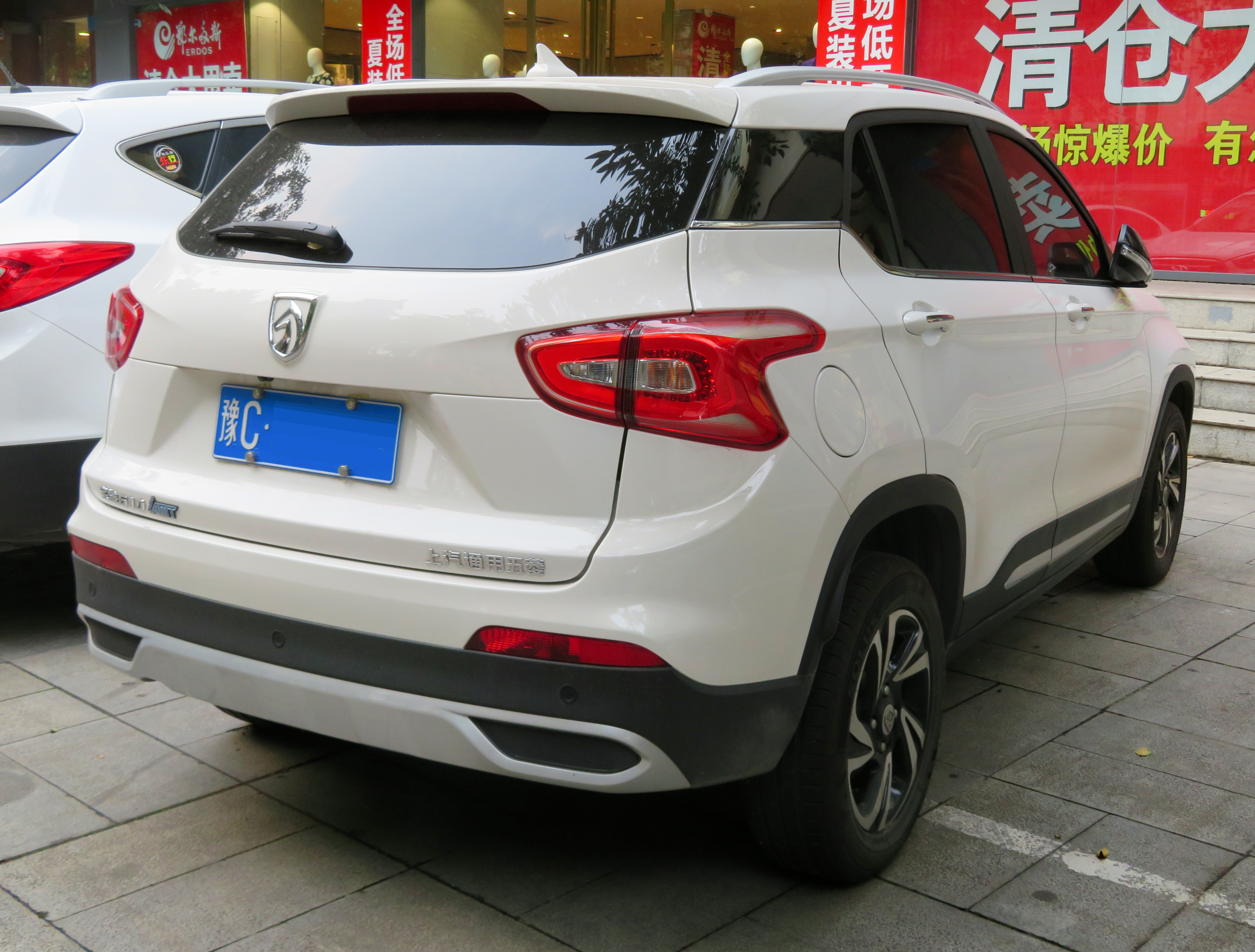
Rear view (pre-facelift)

=== Facelift ===
In July 2019, the 510 received its facelift with an updated grille, rear fascia, and the availability of CVT option with three driving modes.

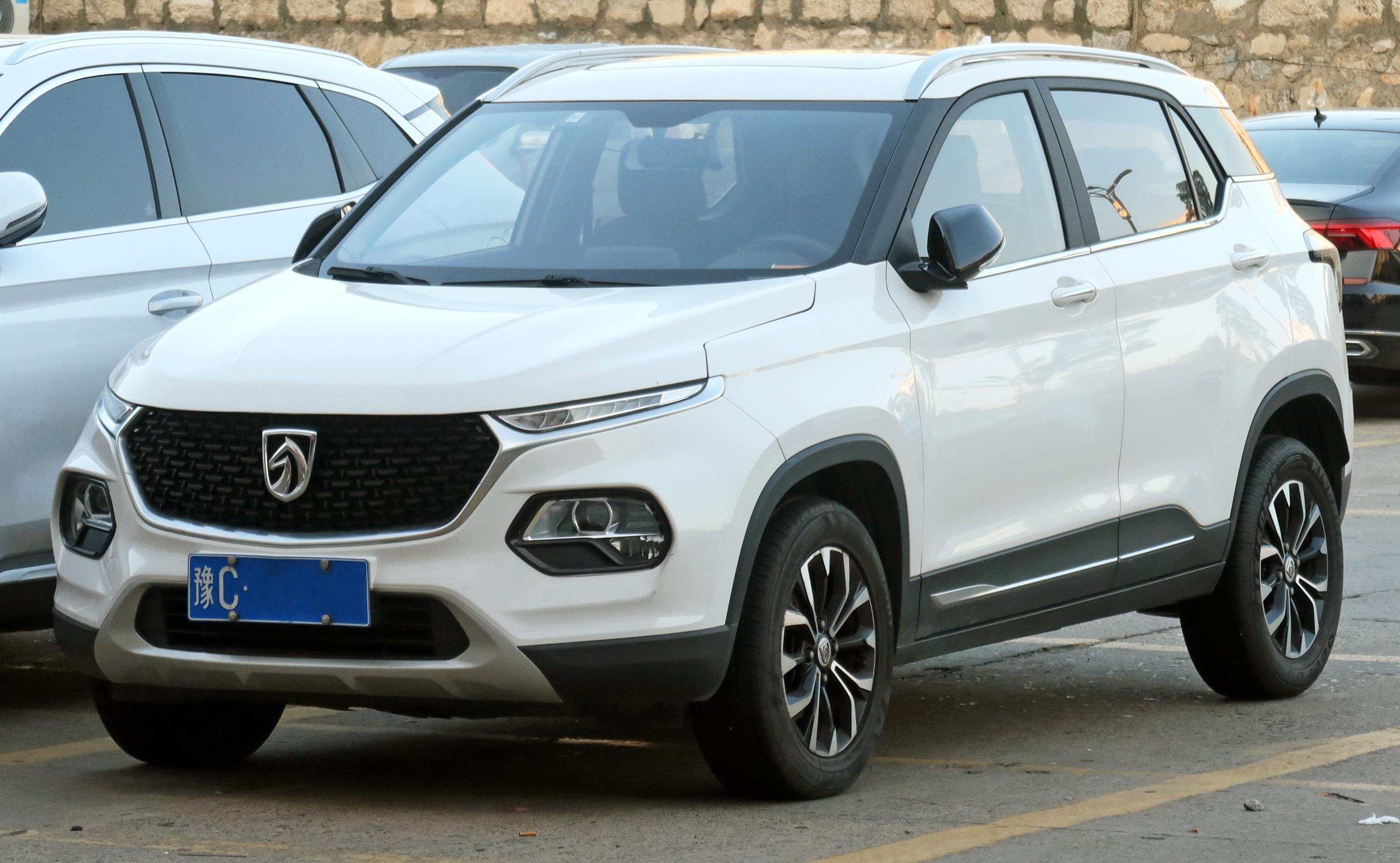
Front view (facelift)

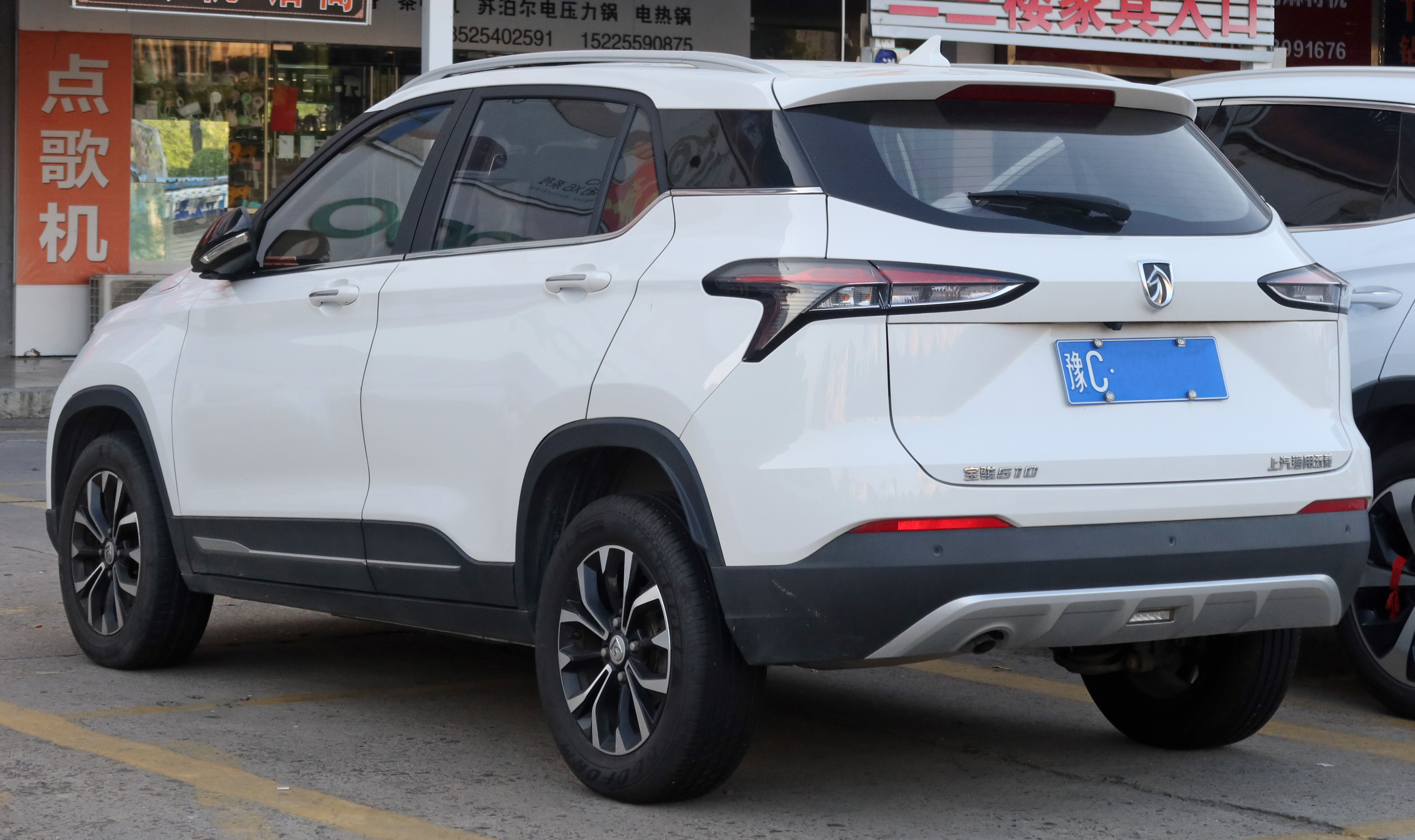
Rear view (facelift)

== Export markets ==
In 2020, SAIC-GM-Wuling began exporting the facelifted 510 to Latin America under the Chevrolet Groove nameplate. It is also exported to the Middle East and Mexico since late 2021.

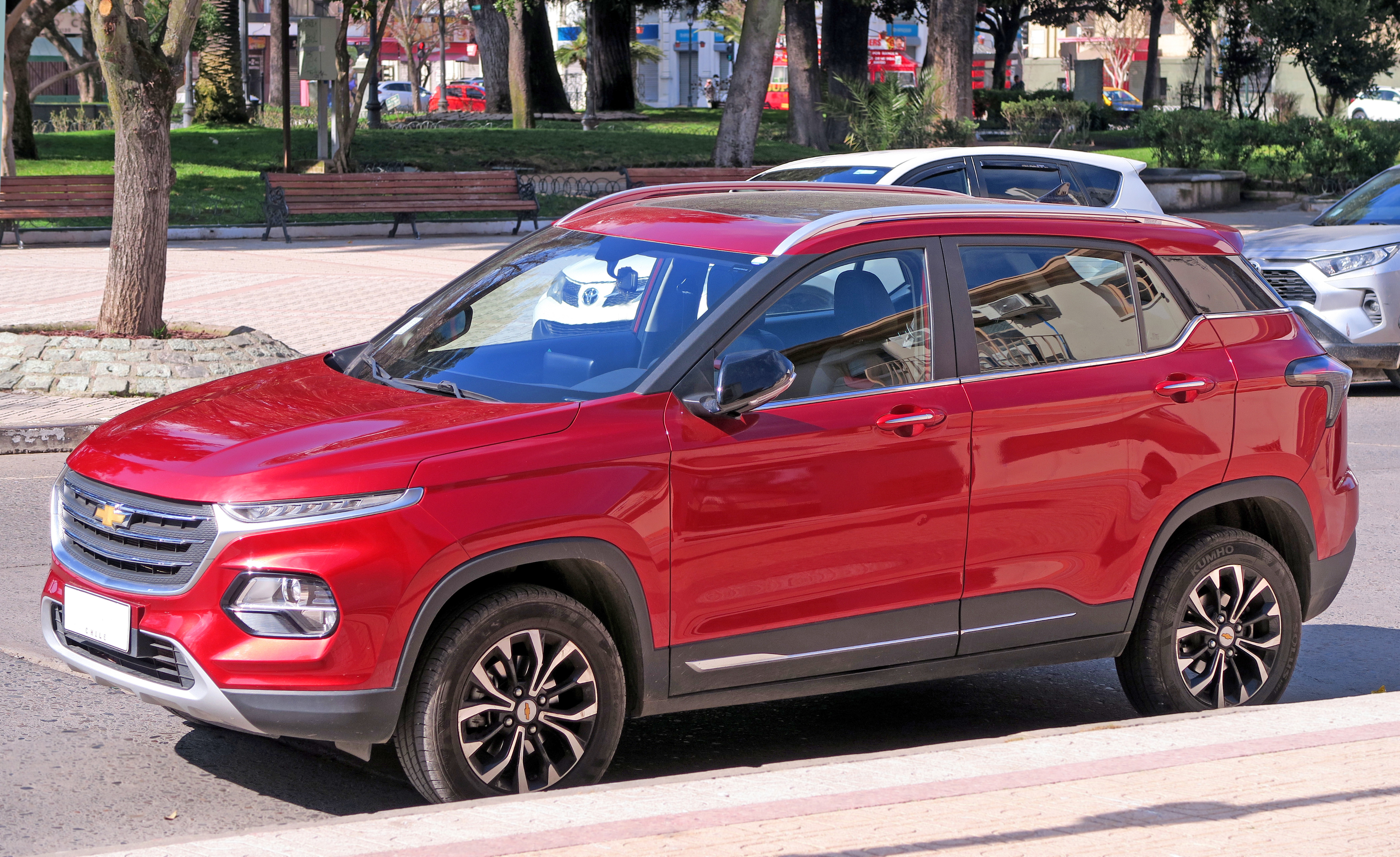
2024 Groove 1.5 Premier (Chile)

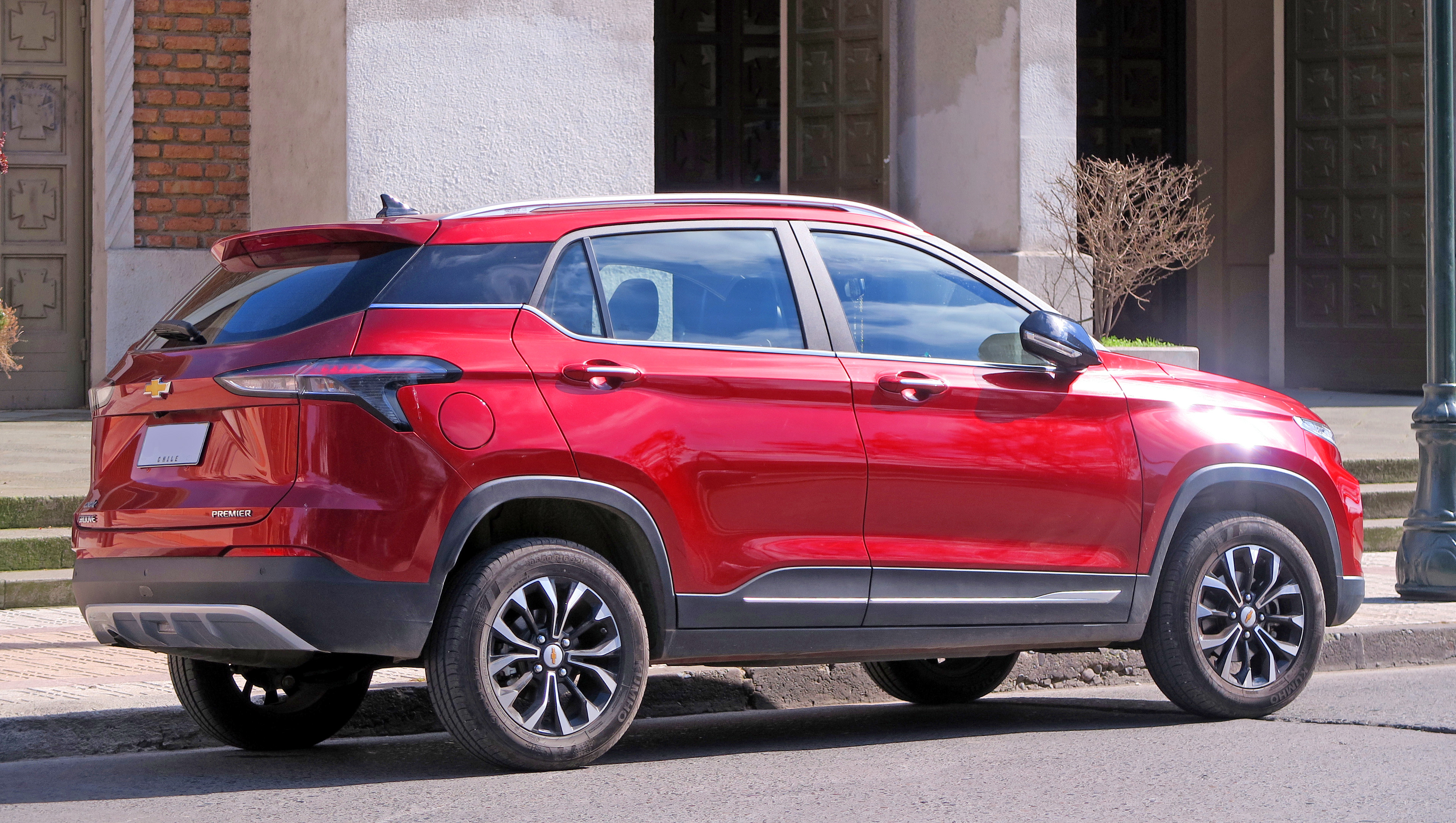
Rear view

== Replacement ==
In late 2019, Baojun introduced the RS-3, which acted as the successor to the 510 but was sold alongside it as a premium option. The 510 continued production until September 2025, when it was discontinued in China, with the RS-3 also ending production around 2023.

For export markets as the Chevrolet Groove, a second-generation Groove debuted in 2025.

== Safety ==
=== Latin NCAP ===
The Groove in its most basic Latin American configuration obtained 0 stars from Latin NCAP 3.0 in 2024 (similar to Euro NCAP 2014).

== Sales ==
| Year | China | Chile |
|---|---|---|
| 2017 | 358,877 | — |
| 2018 | 361,403 | — |
| 2019 | 158,201 | — |
| 2020 | 60,570 | |
| 2021 | 32,991 | 9,007 |
| 2022 | | 5,591 |
| 2023 | 510 | 6,009 |
| 2024 | 1 | |
