= Baojun RS-3 =

Chinese subcompact SUV

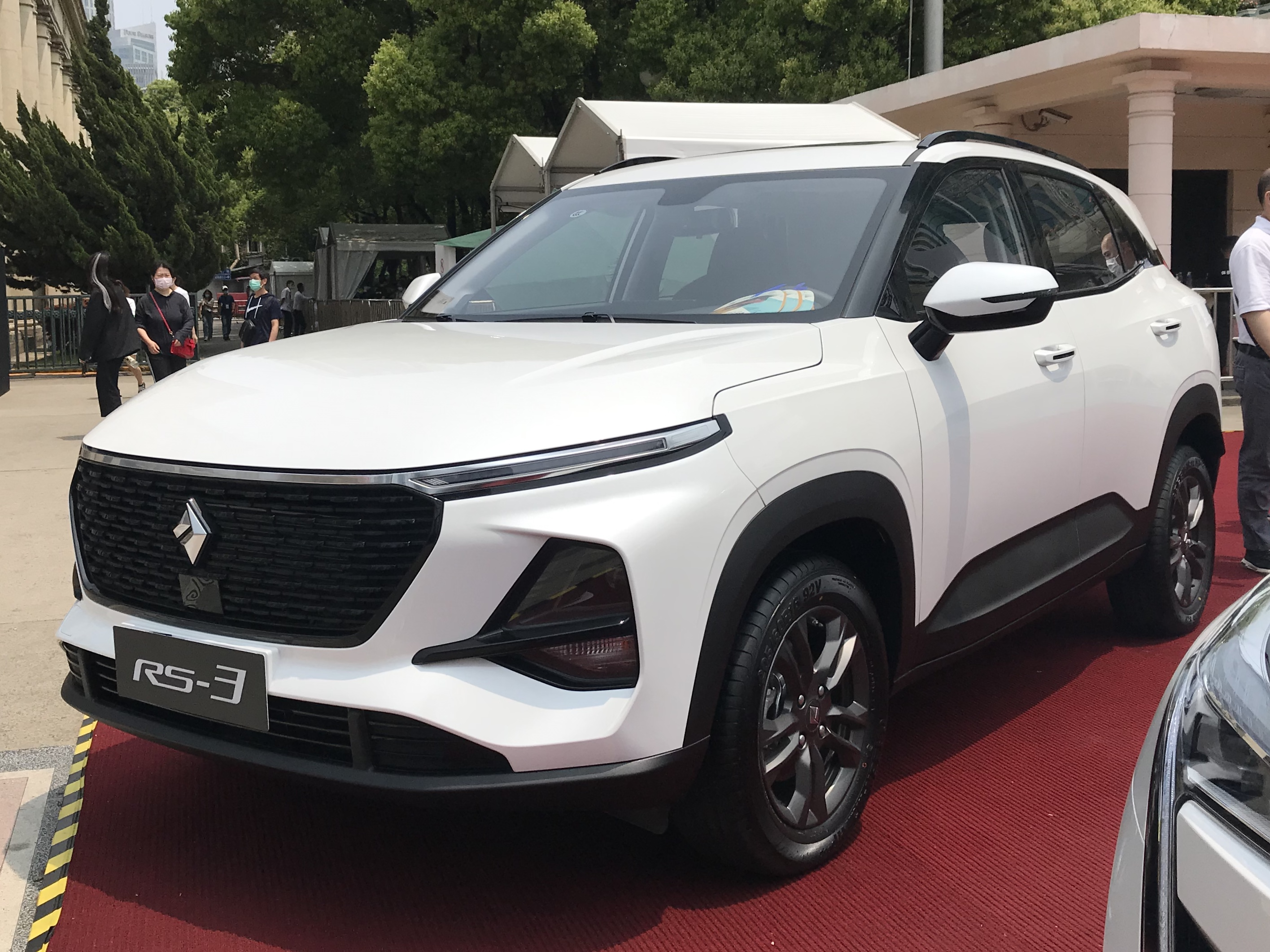

Overview
- Manufacturer: SAIC-GM-Wuling
- Production: September 2019 – 2023
- Assembly: China: Liuzhou, Guangxi

Body and chassis
- Class: Subcompact crossover SUV
- Body style: 5-door SUV
- Layout: Front-engine, front-wheel-drive
- Related: Baojun 510; Wuling Xingchi

Powertrain
- Engine: Petrol: 1.5 L LAR I4; 1.5 L LJO turbo I4
- Power output: 73 kW (98 hp; 99 PS) (LAR); 108 kW (145 hp; 147 PS) (LJO)
- Transmission: 6-speed manual; CVT

Dimensions
- Wheelbase: 2,550 mm (100.4 in)
- Length: 4,305 mm (169.5 in)
- Width: 1,748 mm (68.8 in)
- Height: 1,597 mm (62.9 in)

Chronology
- Predecessor: Baojun 510
- Successor: Wuling Xingchi

The Baojun RS-3 is a subcompact crossover SUV produced by SAIC-GM-Wuling through the Baojun brand.

== Overview ==
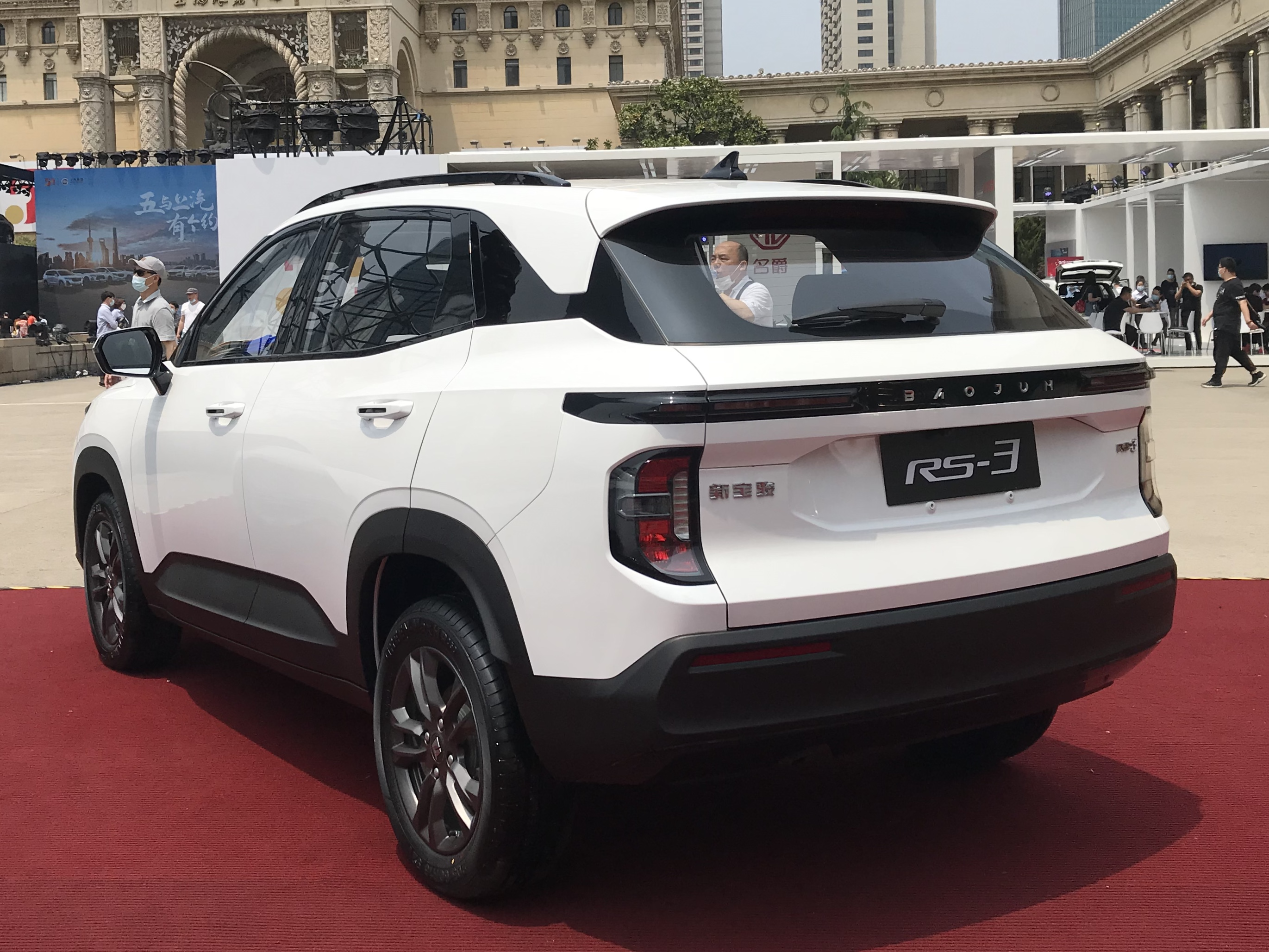
Rear view

The Baojun RS-3 is the successor of Baojun 510, while the 510 continued to be sold alongside the RS-3. As the car sports the new Baojun nomenclature, design language and new Baojun logo, it is marketed under the 'New Baojun' subcategory.

The car was revealed in September 2019, featuring the Interstellar Geometry design language of the brand. and was available across China in October 2019.

At launch in 2019, the power of the Baojun RS-3 1.5-litre naturally aspirated four-cylinder gasoline engine producing 98 horsepower (73 kW; 99 PS) and 105 pound-feet (142 N⋅m; 15 kg⋅m) of torque mated to either a CVT automatic that simulates eight fixed gear ratios or a six-speed manual transmission. Starting from the 2021 model year, an additional turbocharged 1.5-litre four-cylinder engine producing 145 horsepower (108 kW; 147 PS) and 184 pound-feet (249 N⋅m; 25 kg⋅m) of torque connected to a continuously variable automatic transmission was added as standard on the RS-3 Smart Lofty trim while being optional on the Smart Elite and Smart Luxury trims.

The Baojun RS-3 was available in four trim levels in China. Interior technologies of the RS-3 include Baojun's connectivity system that integrates mobile connectivity, an advanced voice recognition system, and over-the-air software upgrades. The RS-3 also features an additional Bosch-supplied Level 2 advanced adaptive cruise control system that can be activated at speeds under 130 kilometers per hour (81 mph).

== Sales ==
Year	China
2019	20,335
2020	66,587
2021	18,202
2022	2,642
2023	307
2024	1
2025	3
