= Mahindra e2o Plus =

Indian 5-door, 4-seater electric city car (2016-2019) by Mahindra Electric

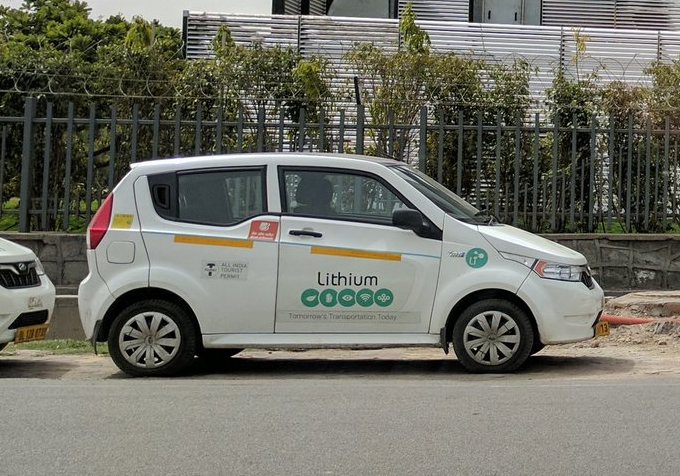

Overview
- Manufacturer: Mahindra Electric
- Production: 2016–2019
- Assembly: Bangalore, Karnataka, India

Body and chassis
- Class: City car
- Body style: 5-door hatchback

Powertrain
- Electric motor: Three-phase AC induction motor, 19 kW or 30 kW.
- Battery: 11 kWh or 15 kWh or 16 kWh (manufacturer's claim) Li-ion
- Range: 110 km or 140 km

Dimensions
- Wheelbase: 2,258 mm (88.9 in)
- Length: 3,590 mm (141.3 in)
- Width: 1,575 mm (62.0 in)
- Height: 1,585 mm (62.4 in)
- Kerb weight: 932–940 kg (2,055–2,072 lb)

The Mahindra e2o Plus was a 5-door, 4-seater electric city car produced between 2016 and 2019 by Mahindra Electric for the Indian market. Its front fascia styling was similar to that of its smaller predecessor, the Mahindra e2o. Unlike its predecessor, it was not sold in the United Kingdom.

== Comparison of specifications ==
Parameter	e2o Plus P2 (fleet vehicle)	e2o Plus P4	e2o Plus P6	e2o Plus P8
ARAI electric range	110 km (68 mi) or 140 km (87 mi)	110 km (68 mi)	110 km (68 mi)	140 km (87 mi)
Battery voltage (V)	48	48	48	72
Battery capacity	210 Ah (~10.1 kWh) or 280 Ah (~13.4 kWh)	210 Ah (~10.1 kWh)	210 Ah (~10.1 kWh)	210 Ah (~15.1 kWh)
Power output	25.4 bhp/18.9 kW	25.4 bhp/18.9 kW	25.4 bhp/18.9 kW	40 bhp/30 kW
Maximum torque (Nm)	70	70	70	91
Curb weight	937 kg (2,066 lb)	932 kg (2,055 lb)	940 kg (2,070 lb)	990 kg (2,180 lb)
Gross weight	1,257 kg (2,771 lb)	1,252 kg (2,760 lb)	1,260 kg (2,780 lb)	1,310 kg (2,890 lb)
Source: Car dekho, Mahindra

== Production ==
The e2o Plus was launched on 21 October 2016 at a price ranging between INR 5.46 lakh and INR 8.46 lakh in Delhi (ex-showroom, after subsidies and incentives). It was one of the cheapest 4-door electric cars in the world, and one of the cheapest 4-door cars with an automatic gearbox (technically, it had no conventional gearbox.)

Initially, it was offered in 4 different trims: P2, P4, P6 and P8. The first three variants had a 19 kW motor powered by a 48V battery pack. The P8 variant had a 30 kW motor powered by a 72V battery pack. According to the manufacturer, the top variant was able to accelerate from 0 to 60 mph in 9.5 seconds.

At the Auto Expo 2018, the manufacturer revealed a version of the e2o Plus with a different front styling and more "premium" interior, named e2o NXT, although given the lack of available photos of this version, except the ones taken at the Auto Expo or shown in promotional materials, it is possible this version never made it into production.

The last e2o Plus rolled off the assembly line on 31 March 2019, although as of May 2019 the vehicle is still available for sale in India. New, more stringent safety rules were mentioned as one of the reasons for discontinuation. Mahindra continues to offer at least one other electric car, the eVerito.

== Fleet use ==
The e2o Plus is used by the all-electric cab service providers in Bangalore, Delhi and other cities.

The ride-hailing company Ola Cabs introduced 100 of these cars in Nagpur in 2017.

The e2o Plus is, or was, used by the car rental company Zoomcar in Bangalore, Delhi, Hyderabad, Mysore and Pune

== See also ==
- REVAi
