= Al Araba 1 =

Al-Araba 1

Overview
- Manufacturer: Al-Araba Company
- Production: 2003
- Assembly: Saudi Arabia
- Designer: Fouzi Ayoub Sabri; Dilip Chhabria

Body and chassis
- Class: Sports luxury car
- Body style: 2-door Coupé
- Layout: Front engine, four-wheel drive
- Related: Mitsubishi Lancer EV08

Powertrain
- Engine: 1.5 L 1468 cc straight-4 Turbo (based on a Japanese Mitsubishi engine)
- Transmission: 5-speed automatic

Dimensions
- Length: 4,572 mm (180.0 in)
- Width: 2,032 mm (80.0 in)
- Height: 1,270 mm (50.0 in)
- Curb weight: 2,250 kg (4,960.4 lb)

The Al Araba 1 (Arabic: العربة) is a sports luxury car created by a joint venture between Saudi Arabian automobile maker Al-Araba Company (officially a vehicle armoring company) and Indian vehicle customising and modification company DC Design . This car was the first Saudi Arabian made civilian vehicle. The project was completed in 2003 and was shown at the Geneva Motor Show. It was built by Fouzi Ayoub Sabri and Dilip Chhabria who based their project on the Mitsubishi Lancer. Few cars were made to keep its rarity and pricing at US$270,000.
