= Chevrolet E-Spark =

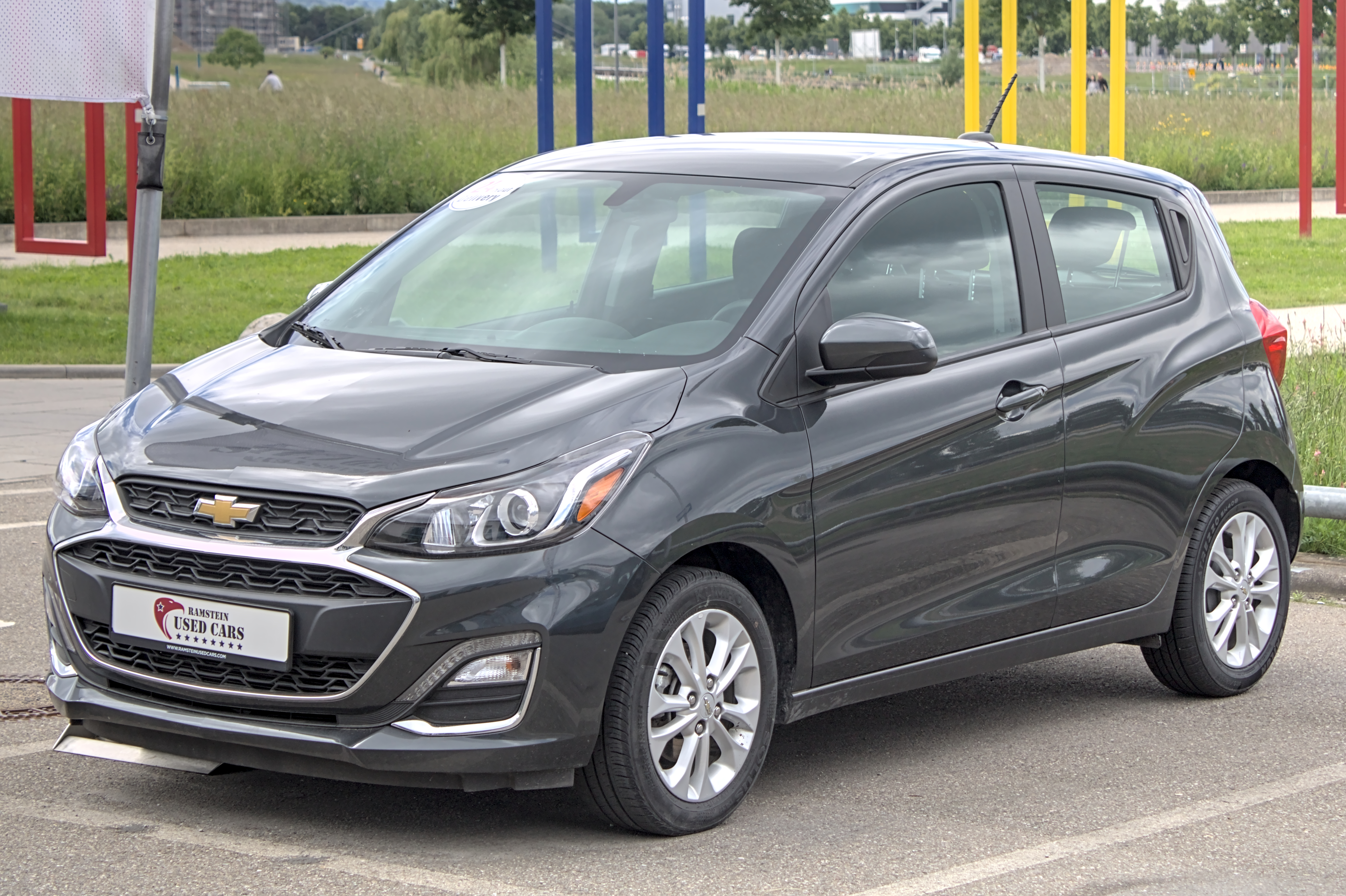

The Chevrolet E-Spark was Chevrolet's proposed electric car for the Indian market. It was supposed to be an entry-level hatchback based on the Chevrolet Spark.

E-Spark was to be a joint venture between General Motors (GM) and RECC (Reva Electric Car Company) with GM providing the Chevrolet Spark platform and RECC providing the electric motor-battery kit. Unveiled in Auto Expo 2010, New Delhi, this car was supposed to hit the Indian consumers in October.

But everything changed with Mahindra picking up 55.2% controlling stake in the Bangalore based Maini Group that owns RECC and the project was cancelled as Mahindra and GM are rival competitors in the Indian auto industry

== See also ==
- Chevrolet Spark EV
