= Mahindra Last Mile Mobility Limited =

Indian car manufacturer

Mahindra Electric

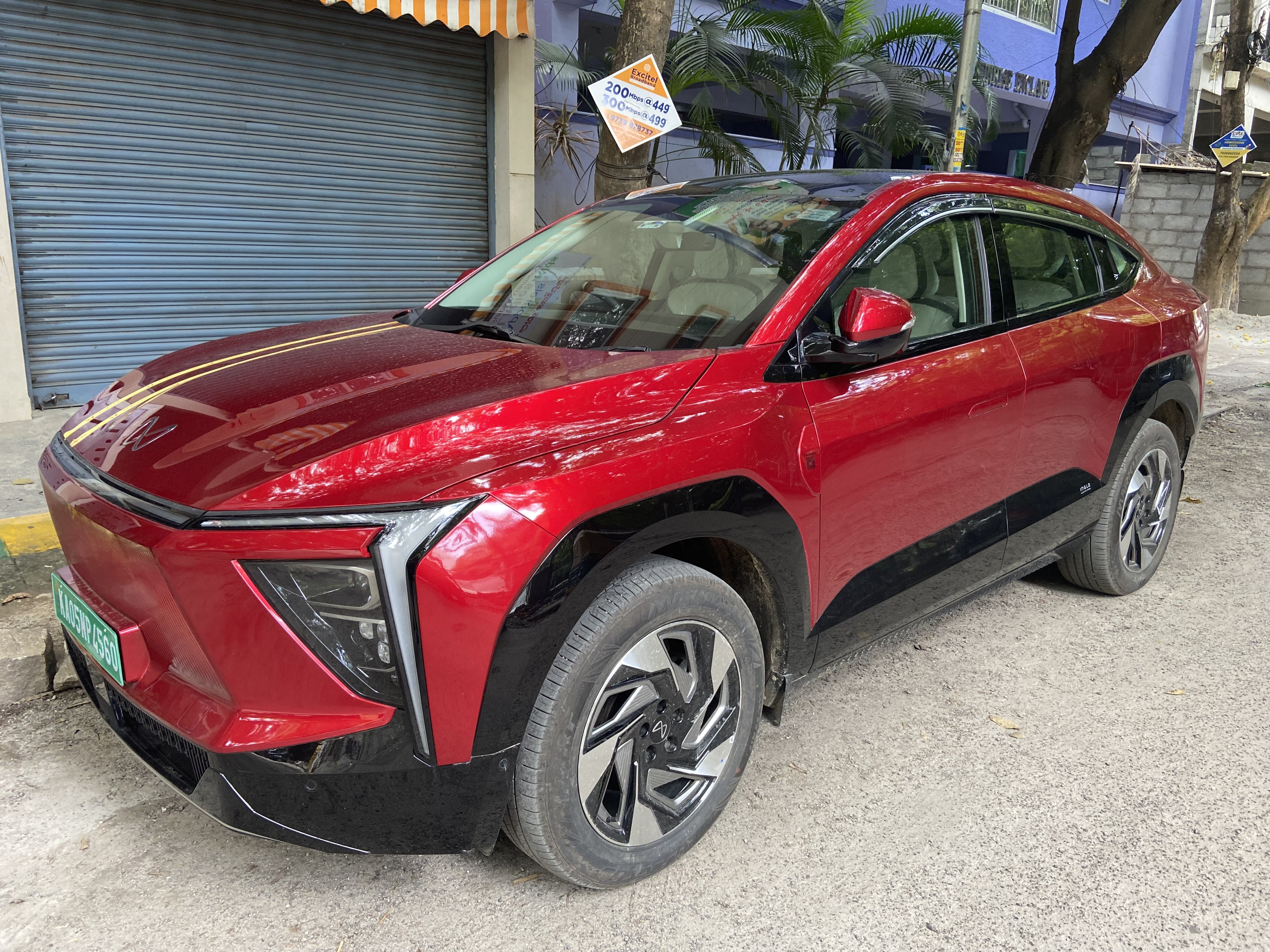
- Formerly: Reva Electric Car Company (2010-2016); Mahindra Electric Mobility Limited (2016-2023)
- Industry: Automotive
- Founded: 1994; 32 years ago
- Founder: Chetan Maini
- Defunct: 1 April 2023
- Fate: Merged with Mahindra & Mahindra
- Headquarters: Bangalore, India
- Key people: Suman Mishra (CEO)
- Products: Electric vehicles
- Parent: Mahindra & Mahindra
- Website: mahindraelectricsuv.com mahindralastmilemobility.com

Mahindra Electric, also known as Mahindra Last Mile Mobility Limited, formerly known as Mahindra Electric Mobility Limited (2016–2023) and Reva Electric Car Company (2010–2016), was an Indian company based in Bangalore that designed and manufactured compact electric vehicles. The company's first vehicle, the REVAi electric car, was available in 26 countries with 4,000 versions sold worldwide by mid-March 2011. Reva was acquired by the Indian conglomerate Mahindra & Mahindra in May 2010. After the acquisition, the company launched the electric hatchback e2o in 2013. The company sold electric vehicles in different segments – the electric sedan eVerito, the electric commercial vehicle eSupro (passenger and cargo), and the Treo range of low maintenance, lithium-ion battery-powered three-wheelers. As a part of Mahindra & Mahindra, they now sell the XUV 400, BE 6 and XEV 9e under the Mahindra branding, while electric commercial vehicles still use the Last Mile Mobility branding.

== History ==
The logo of the company, 2023-present

The Reva Electric Car Company (RECC) was founded in 1994 by Chetan Maini as a joint venture between the Maini Group and Amerigon Electric Vehicle Technologies. The company aimed to develop and produce an affordable, compact electric car. In 2001, RECC launched the REVA, a small micro electric hatchback.

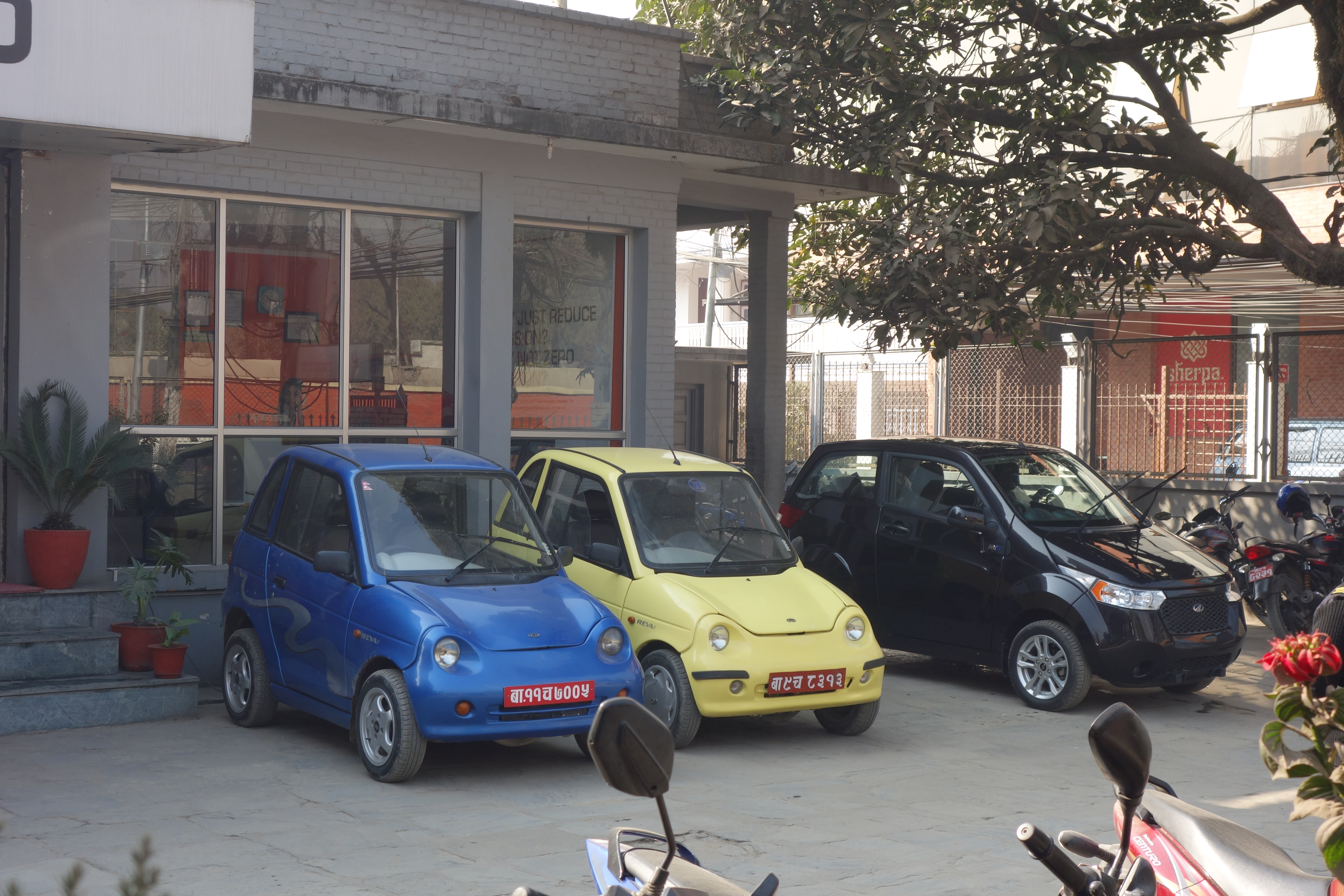
Two REVAis and a Mahindra e2o at a Mahindra REVA dealership in Kathmandu, Nepal.

RECC joined up with several automotive experts to develop components for REVA. Curtis Instruments created a motor controller for the car. The car had a power pack for which Tudor India Limited supplied customized Prestolite batteries. The charger for Reva was developed by Modular Power Systems, a division of TDI Power. Later, RECC started manufacturing the charger through a technical collaboration agreement between MPS and the Maini Group.

In 2004, GoinGreen of the UK agreed with RECC to import REVA cars and market them under the name G-Wiz.

In 2008, a revamped REVA model was launched called the REVAi. The company started production of a Lithium-ion variant called the REVA L-ion in 2009.

In 2009, at the Frankfurt Motor Show, Reva presented its future models — the Reva NXR and Reva NXG. During the event, Reva and General Motors India declared a technical collaboration to develop an affordable EV for the Indian market. As a result of this, General Motors India announced an electric version of their hatchback in the New Delhi Auto Expo 2010. Named the e-Spark, Reva was to provide the battery technology for the vehicle.

On 26 May 2010, India's largest sports utility vehicles and tractor maker Mahindra & Mahindra bought a 55.2% controlling stake in Reva. Following the deal, the company was renamed Mahindra Reva Electric Vehicles Private Limited. The president of the automotive sector at Mahindra & Mahindra, Pawan Goenka, became the new company's chairman. As a result of the ownership change, General Motors pulled out of the tie-up with Reva that was to produce the e-Spark.

Before the Mahindra acquisition, Reva had partnered with Bannon Automotive to set up an assembly plant in upstate New York to produce the NXR for the US market. In December 2010, Bannon filed a lawsuit against Reva, alleging that the company had not fulfilled its agreement to allow Bannon to manufacture and sell the NXR in the United States. The case was settled in January 2012, and the result was not disclosed.

In February 2011, GoinGreen, the UK's exclusive importer of the G-Wiz, announced that it was no longer stocking the model (although it would order them on a 4-6-week lead time when requested by customers).

In 2014, Reva displayed an all-electric sports car concept called Halo. It was claimed to reach 0–100 km/h under 8 sec with a top speed of 160 km/h and range of over 200 km in one full range. The concept featured a large tablet on the centre console that displayed various car functions in real time, and also doubled as a multimedia player.

In 2016, the company was rebranded as Mahindra Electric Mobility Ltd. to reflect not just the business line of producing vehicles, but also developing powertrains and integrated mobility solutions.

In 2018, Mahindra showed a concept for a small electric quadricycle called the Atom, with the production version of the auto-rickshaw-based 4-wheeler shown at the 2020 Auto Expo. Like the REVAi/G-Wiz, the quadricycle is planned to be built in Bengaluru and will join larger EV models like the Mahindra eXUV300 and eKUV100 in the company's range. Its launch was delayed due to the COVID-19 pandemic in 2020, and its current status remains unknown.

In 2023, the company was rebranded again as Mahindra Last Mile Mobility Ltd., in a complete merger with parent company Mahindra & Mahindra Ltd.

Since 2025, the Mahindra Electric marque is used for electric SUVs while the Mahindra Last Mile Mobility marque is used for commercial vehicles.

== Products ==
=== REVA and REVAi ===
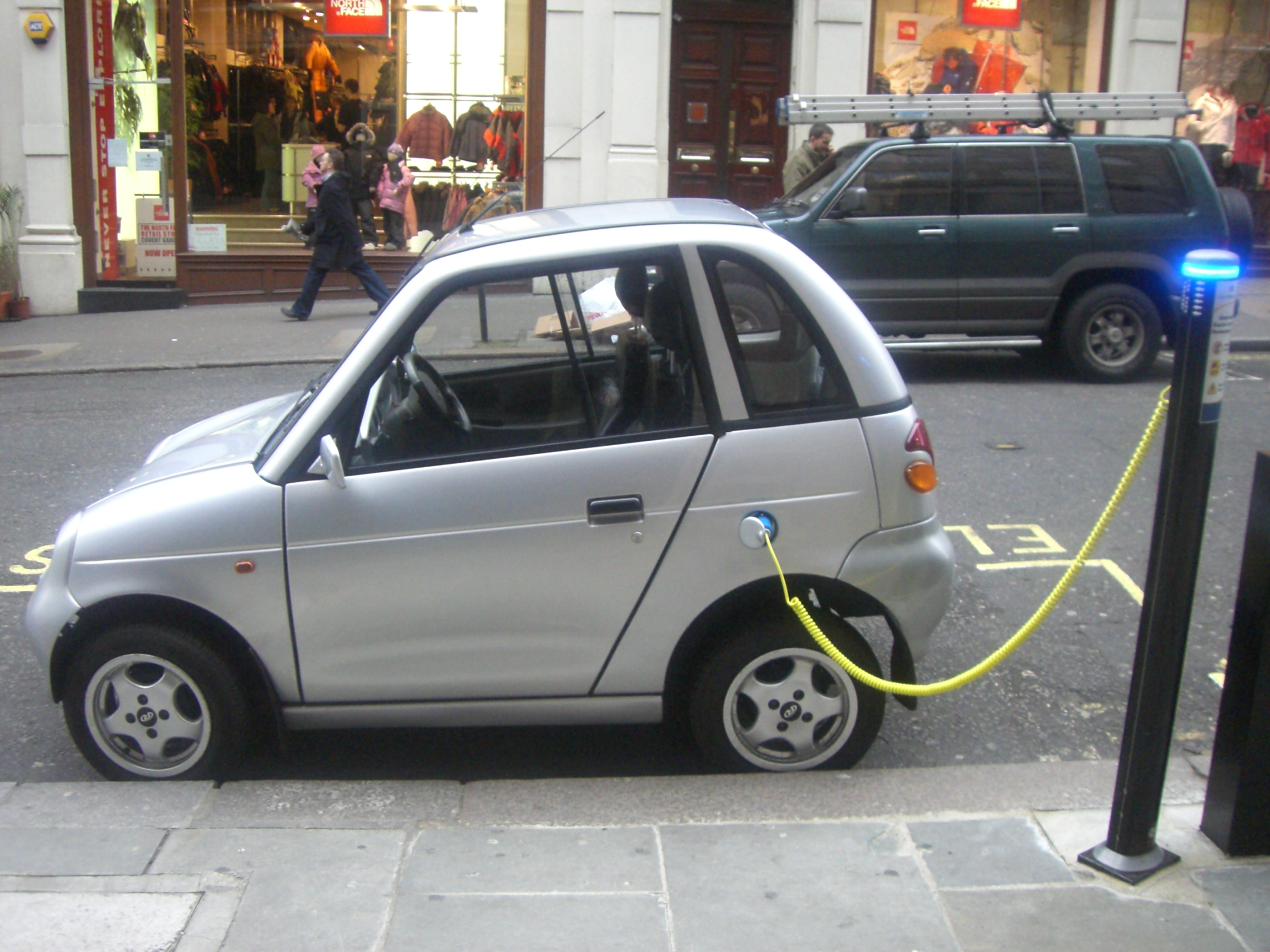
The REVAi, also known as the G-Wiz i, charging at an on-street station in London.

Mahindra Reva currently produces two versions of the REVAi, an urban electric micro-car seating two adults and two children:

- REVAi, equipped with lead-acid batteries, which has a nominal range of 80 km (50 mi) per charge and a top speed of 80 km/h (50 mph).
- REVA L-ion, equipped with Lithium-ion batteries, which has higher acceleration and a nominal range of 120 km (75 mi) per charge.

The REVA went on sale in India in 2001 and in the UK in 2003. By mid-March 2011, 4,000 units of the REVA and its variants had been sold. The car was also available in the following countries: Belgium, Bhutan, Brazil, Chile, Colombia, Costa Rica, Cyprus, France, Germany, Greece, Hungary, Iceland, Ireland, Japan, Malta, Monaco, Nepal, Norfolk Islands, Norway, Peru, the Philippines, Portugal, Spain, and Sri Lanka. The REVA is exempt from most European crash test rules, because its low weight and power registers it in the European "heavy quadricycle" category instead of the "car" category.

In 2005, Reva showcased the REVA-NXG, a two-seater roadster concept car with a nominal range of 200 km (124 mi) per charge and a top speed of 120 km/h (75 mph).

=== Mahindra e2o ===
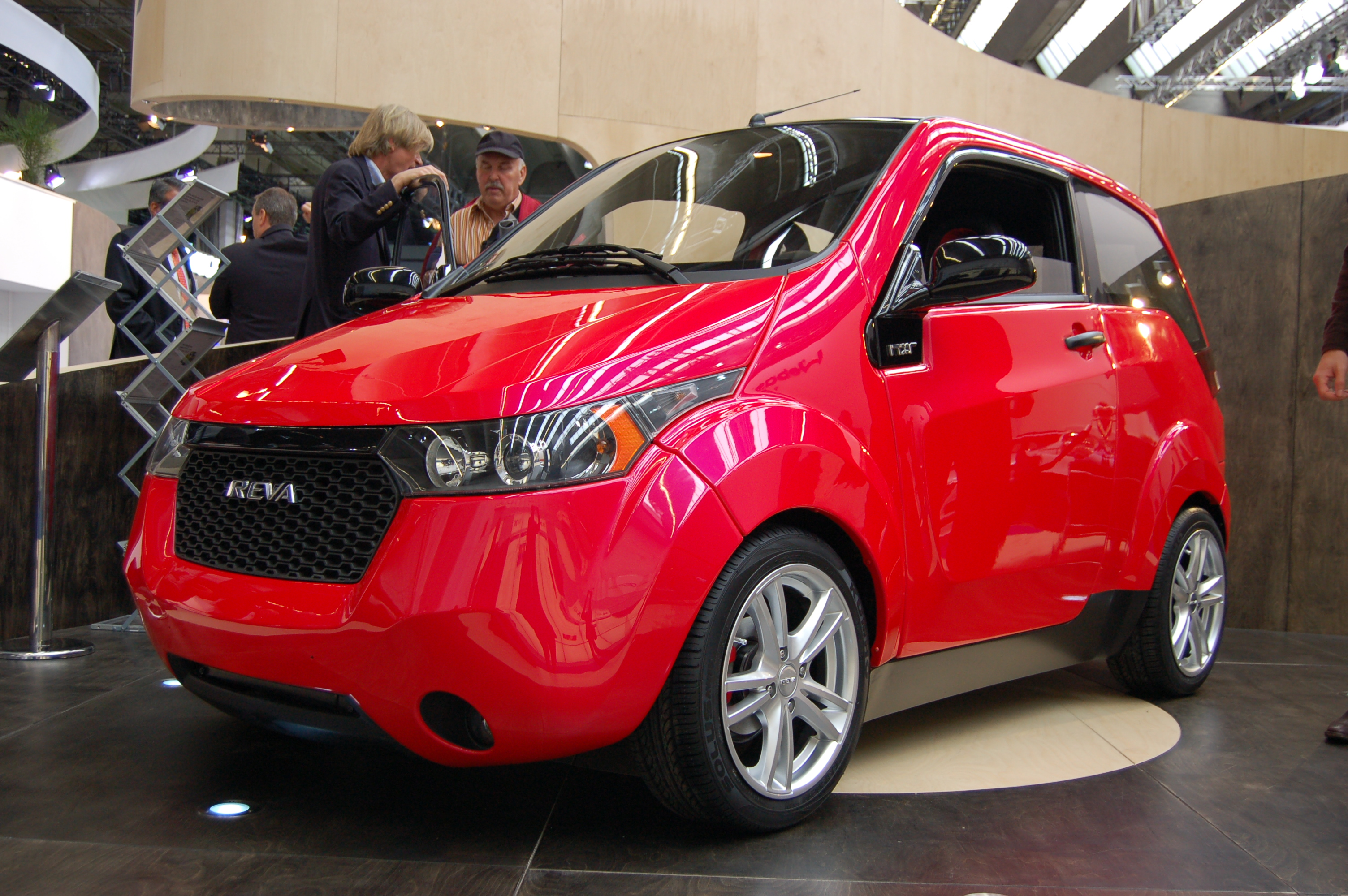
REVA NXR concept car.

The Mahindra e2o, previously the REVA NXR, is an urban electric car hatchback manufactured by the Mahindra Group. The e2o is the successor to the REVA/G-Wiz and was developed using REVA's technology. The REVA NXR electric concept car was unveiled at the 2009 Frankfurt Motor Show. Export production was initially scheduled for 2012. Production was initially scheduled for late 2010 with deliveries slated for early 2011. The e2o was launched in India in March 2013 at a price of ₹5,96,000 (US$11,000) after a 29% government subsidy granted by the state of Delhi. The e2o was also launched in Mumbai, Bangalore, Pune, Ahmedabad, Hyderabad, Chandigarh, and Kochi. Mahindra also launched the vehicle in the UK withdrew from the market in May 2017.

The electric car has a lithium-ion battery pack that takes five hours for a full charge and weighs 830 kg (1,830 lb). It provides a range of 100 km (62 mi) and a top speed of 90 km/h (56 mph). The product was eventually pulled from the market following the launch of its four-door successor.

=== e-Verito ===
The e-Verito was launched in 2016 and was Mahindra's second electric car. Based on the normal Verito, which was an evolution of the Mahindra Renault joint venture Dacia Logan, it features a 21.2 kWh battery with a claimed range of 181 km.

=== Treo Plus, Treo Yaari and Treo Zor ===
In November 2018, Mahindra Electric launched the Treo range of three-wheelers. They are powered by lithium-ion technology. The range includes the Treo, an electric auto, and the Treo Yaari, an electric rickshaw. The Treo auto has a certified driving range of 170 km and a typical driving range of 130 km after 3 hours and 50 minutes of charging. The certified range for the Treo Yaari is 130 km, and it can achieve a typical driving range of 85 km after 2 hours and 30 minutes of charging. Both models feature a direct drive transmission, with the Treo having a peak power of 5.4 kW and a peak torque of 30 Nm and the Treo Yaari having a peak power of 1.96 kW and a peak torque of 19 Nm.

Both the Treo and the Treo Yaari have a wheelbase of 2050 mm and a turning radius of 2.9 m. The Treo range has a vehicle kerb weight between 340 and 350 kg, while the Treo Yaari range has a vehicle kerb weight between 265 and 275 kg.

Mahindra Electric signed a Memorandum of Understanding (MoU) with Three Wheels United (TWU), a social enterprise providing affordable financing for autorickshaw drivers, and Smart-E for the supply of a total of 2,000 Treo units in 2020.

=== XUV400 ===
Mahindra unveiled the XUV400 electric on 8 September 2022, which is based on Mahindra XUV300. The new Mahindra Twin Peaks logo, reserved for Sport Utility Vehicles, is used in copper. Mahindra also unveiled XUV400 Special Edition in November 2022. They claimed a driving range of 456 km on a single charge. It can take 50 minutes to 13 hours to charge depending on the type of charger.

The Mahindra XUV400 also features three driving modes - Fun, Fast and Fearless - that adjust the steering and throttle response as well as the level of regenerative braking. Mahindra claims that the XUV400 is capable of single-pedal driving where the regenerative braking takes care of the deceleration. The car launched in India on 16 January 2023 at a price of ₹15,99,000 (US$18,000).

On 11 January 2024, Mahindra launched two new variants of the XUV400, the XUV400 EC Pro and the XUV400 EL Pro, with both models having redesigned interiors.

=== BE 6 and XEV 9e ===
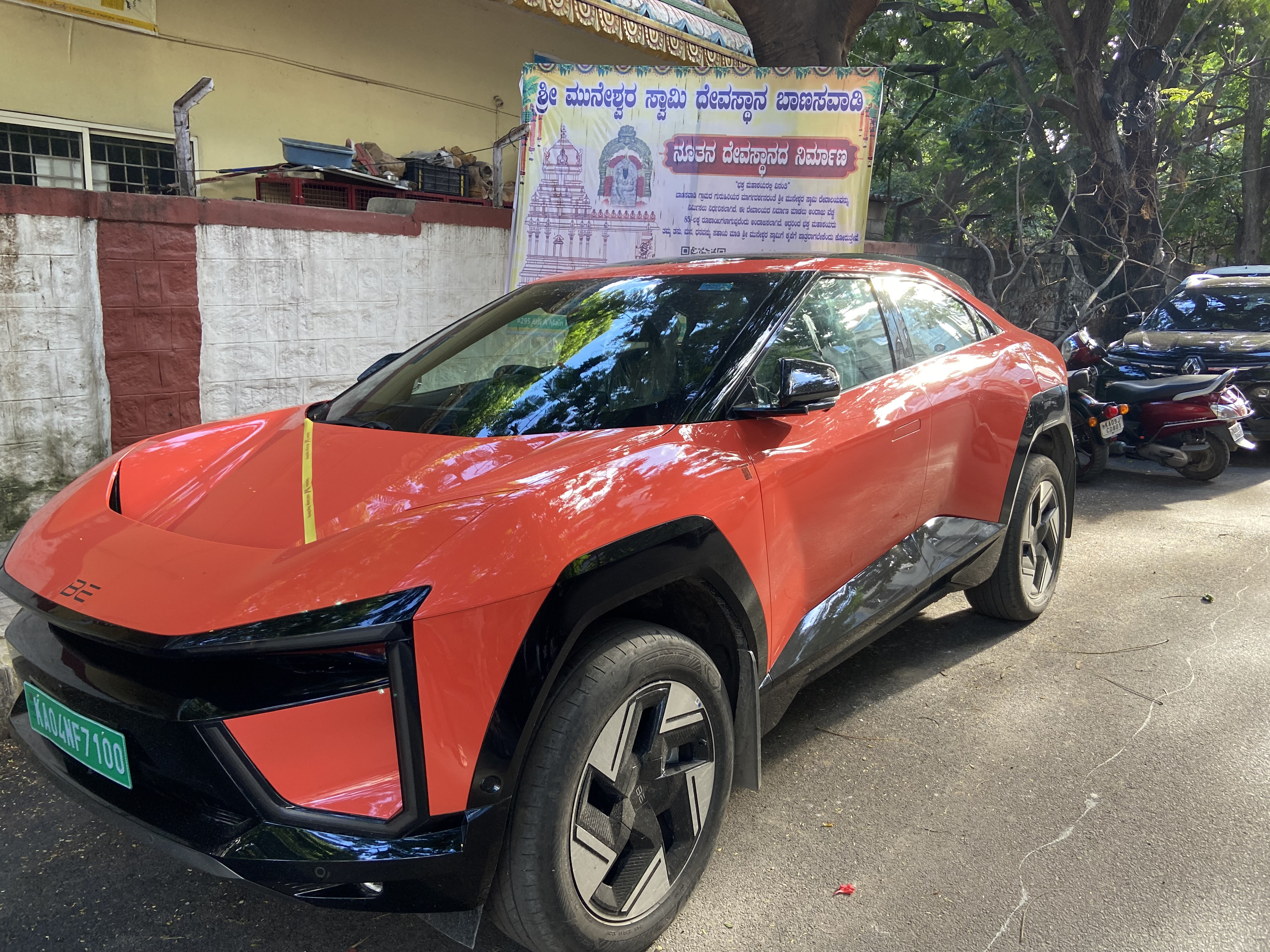
Mahindra BE6 EV

In November 2024, Mahindra launched 2 all-electric SUVs, the XEV 9e and the BE 6 in India as part of its new BEV range with deliveries starting in early 2025.

=== XEV 9S and BE 6 FE ===
In November 2025, Mahindra launched the electric XUV700, the XEV 9S and the BE 6 Formula E edition (also known as RALL-E).

== Born Electric and XEV ==
Born Electric (BE) and XEV are electric SUV Sub-brands under Indian automobile manufacturer Mahindra.

In 2022, Mahindra unveiled 4 all-new electric SUVs under 2 brand names, XUV and BE. XUV.e8, XUV.e9 and BE.05, BE.07, BE.09 at Mahindra Advanced Design Europe (MADE) in Oxfordshire, United Kingdom. BE.RALL-E was unveiled in Hyderabad on 11 February 2023. Global Pik-up and THAR.e concepts were unveiled in 2023 in South Africa.

INGLO modular platform or INGLO-born electric platform.

On 26 November 2024, Mahindra launched 2 all-electric SUVs, the XEV 9e (formerly XUV.e9) and the BE 6 (formerly BE.05) in India as part of its 'Born electric' BEV range with deliveries starting in early 2025.

On 26 November 2025, Mahindra launched the three-row SUV in India called XEV 9S (formerly XUV.e8).

== Mahindra Electric and Formula E ==
A Formula E car was showcased by Mahindra Electric, as part of the Mahindra Group, at the 2014 Auto Expo in Delhi. Mahindra Electric's team worked closely with Mahindra Racing, the racing division of the Mahindra Group, to get the Formula E cars ready for the first race of the inaugural FIA Formula E Championship, which took place in Beijing in September 2014. The Mahindra Racing Team is the only Indian team to race in the inaugural Formula E championship. Following a successful Formula E race in Beijing, Mahindra Racing explored the possibility of bringing the electric-powered car series to India in the 2016–2017 season.

The knowledge and technology used in Formula E cars will be used for commercial electric cars with performance characteristics usually seen in cars with high-performance internal combustion engines.

== See also ==
- Electric vehicle industry in India
