= Fouzi Ayoub Sabri =

Fouzi Ayoub Sabri (Arabic: فوزي أيوب صبري) is a Saudi Arabian businessman, engineer and car designer who founded, owns and sits as current CEO of Al-Araba Company for vehicle customizing and vehicle armouring. He is the creator of the first Saudi car, Al Araba 1.

The company's products were sold to numerous military and civilian entities, such as the Saudi Ministry of Defense, the Saudi Ministry of Interior, and the Saudi National Guard, in addition to the Saudi Ministry of Foreign Affairs and the Qatari Ministry of Foreign Affairs. They were also sold to NATO forces deployed in the Persian Gulf, European Union representatives in the Arab states of the Persian Gulf, and private palace security.
