= DC Avanti =

Overview
- Manufacturer: DC Design, India
- Production: 2012–2020
- Assembly: Pune, India
- Designer: Dilip Chhabria

Body and chassis
- Class: Sports car
- Body style: 2-door coupé
- Layout: Mid-engine, rear-wheel-drive

Powertrain
- Engine: Renault 2.0 L Engine
- Transmission: 6-speed manual

Dimensions
- Wheelbase: 2,700 mm (110 in)
- Length: 4,623 mm (182.0 in)
- Width: 1,967 mm (77.4 in)
- Height: 1,213 mm (47.8 in)
- Curb weight: 1,562 kg (3,444 lb)

The DC Avanti is a coupe styled sports car produced by DC Design, an Indian design firm originally headed by Dilip Chhabria. Its name was based on the Studebaker Avanti. It was unveiled at the 2012 Auto Expo in New Delhi. The Avanti is powered by 2.0-litre four-cylinder turbocharged petrol engine producing 250 bhp with a six-speed manual transmission. A limited-edition model launched in 2015 comes with 310 bhp output and paddle shifters with only 31 units produced.

== Design ==
The car's frame is made of composite high steel and the body consists of carbon composite, to create a strong, yet lightweight vehicle.

=== Interior ===
The interior was designed primarily with leather which is used primarily on the doors, dashboard and seats. The instrument cluster, steering wheel, and AC are all included in basic units.

=== Exterior ===
The car is available in red, white, silver, blue, orange, grey or yellow, with black stripes.

The headlamps are bi-xenon units with LED DRLS shaped like eyebrows. Foils are added at the back to boost air intake to complement a single air vent located on top. The vehicle also has a long low bonnet that dips in the middle to emphasize the DC Design logo.

The car has all-wheel disc brakes and 20" alloy wheels.

=== Engine and gearbox ===
It is powered by a 2-litre, 4-cylinder, turbocharged, petrol EURO-4 compliant engine, sourced from Renault. This is mated to a six-speed, dual clutch transmission, and drives the rear wheels.

== Sales ==
The Avanti has been on sale since 2015. According to official figures, as of December 29, 2020, 127 DC Avanti cars were sold in India and abroad.

== Specifications ==
=== Engine ===
The Avanti uses a Renault 2 Litre Petrol Turbo Engine.

Capacity	1,998 cc (122 cu in)
Max. power	254 PS (187 kW; 251 bhp) @ 5,500 rpm
Max. speed	200 km/h (120 mph) @ 5,500 rpm

Specifications
Item	Specification
-Body work	Steel with carbon composite
Engine configuration	Turbo Charged I4
Valve Train	DOHC 16V
Fuel Delivery	Direct Injection
Power output	250 bhp: Manual Transmission
Turning Radius (wheel base)	6 metres
Seating capacity	2
No. of Doors	2
Length	4550mm
Width	1965mm
Height	1200mm
Ground Clearance	170mm
Wheel base	2700mm
Air Conditioner	Yes
Power steering	Yes
Rear A/C Vents	No
Navigation system	Optional
Adjustable Seats	Yes
CD Player	Yes
CD changer	No
FM/AM Radio	Yes
Anti-lock braking system	Yes
Parking sensors	Yes
Mileage	8 to 10 Kmpl
Central Locking	Yes
