= Dilip Chhabria =

Indian car designer

- Education: Art Center College of Design
- Occupation: Automobile designer
- Known for: DC Avanti, REVA NXR and DC TCA
- Children: 2

Dilip Chhabria is an Indian car designer and the founder of DC Design. He designed and manufactured the DC Avanti.

In 2020, he was arrested for running a car scam.

== Biography ==
Dilip Chhabria graduated with a bachelor's degree in commerce. He then studied in the Art Center College of Design in Pasadena, US.

After graduating, he worked for General Motors. He returned to India to start a workshop in Marol. His first product was a ring shaped horn for the Premier Padmini.

In 2002, he was hired by the Kinetic Engineering Limited to design a scooter. In 2003, DC Design constructed a prototype for Aston Martin Vantage. In 2004 he designed a car for the film Taarzan: The Wonder Car. In 2006, he tied up with Exim Star of ETA Star Group to form a new company, DCStar. In 2009, he designed a concept car for the Coca-Cola Company to promote the energy drink Burn in India. In 2011, he designed the REVA NXR electric car for Mahindra & Mahindra. In 2012, Air Works India tied up with Chhabria to design airplane interiors. In 2013, he was hired by Siddhi Vinayak Logistics to design the buses for their luxury bus service. In 2014, he designed custom luxury buses for Girikand Logistics. In 2015, he launched the DC Avanti.

In 2010, he launched the DYPDC Center for Automotive Research and Studies with the D. Y. Patil group.

=== Car scam ===
On 29 December 2020, Chhabria was arrested for running a car scam.

On 7 January 2021, comedian Kapil Sharma filed an FIR against Chhabria for cheating him.

== See also ==
- DYPDC Center for Automotive Research and Studies
- DC Avanti
