= Mahindra Renault =

Joint venture in India

Mahindra Renault Limited
- Type: Joint Venture
- Industry: Automotive
- Founded: 2007
- Defunct: 2010
- Fate: Merged
- Successor: Mahindra & Mahindra
- Headquarters: Nashik, Maharashtra
- Products: Automobiles

Mahindra Renault Limited was a joint venture between India's largest utility vehicle manufacturer Mahindra & Mahindra Limited & Renault S.A. of France (51% & 49% respectively). The joint venture was formed in 2007. On 15 April 2010 Mahindra & Mahindra and Renault together announced restructuring plans by which Mahindra would buy Renault's share in the joint venture and Renault would continue to provide the support for M&M through license agreement and continue to be supplier of key components.

== Manufacturing facilities ==
Mahindra Renault Limited utilized Mahindra's manufacturing plant in Nashik, Maharashtra with a capacity of 50,000 vehicles per year. Renault-Nissan have invested Rs 4,500 Crores to build a manufacturing plant in Chennai which will have a capacity of 400,000 vehicles per annum divided equally between Mahindra Renault Limited and Nissan Motor India Private Limited.

== Models ==
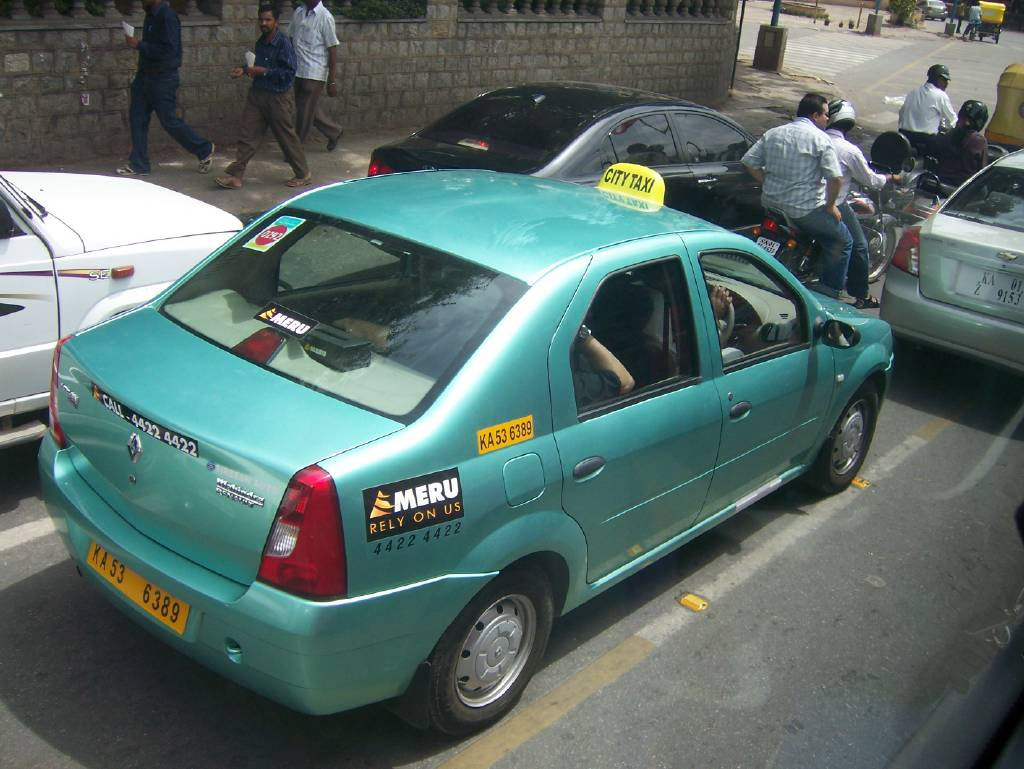
Taxi Version of Renault Logan in Bangalore.

The Renault Logan was launched 2007 and became the Mahindra Verito after the ending of the joint venture in 2010.

== Sales and service network ==
Mahindra Renault Limited uses Mahindra & Mahindra Limited's network for the sales and service of Renault branded vehicles in India. It currently has more than 140 dealerships across 125 cities in 24 states and 3 Union Territories of India.

== See also ==
- Mahindra & Mahindra Limited
- Renault S.A.
- Automotive industry in India
