= Mahindra e2o =

Urban electric car hatchback manufactured by Mahindra Reva

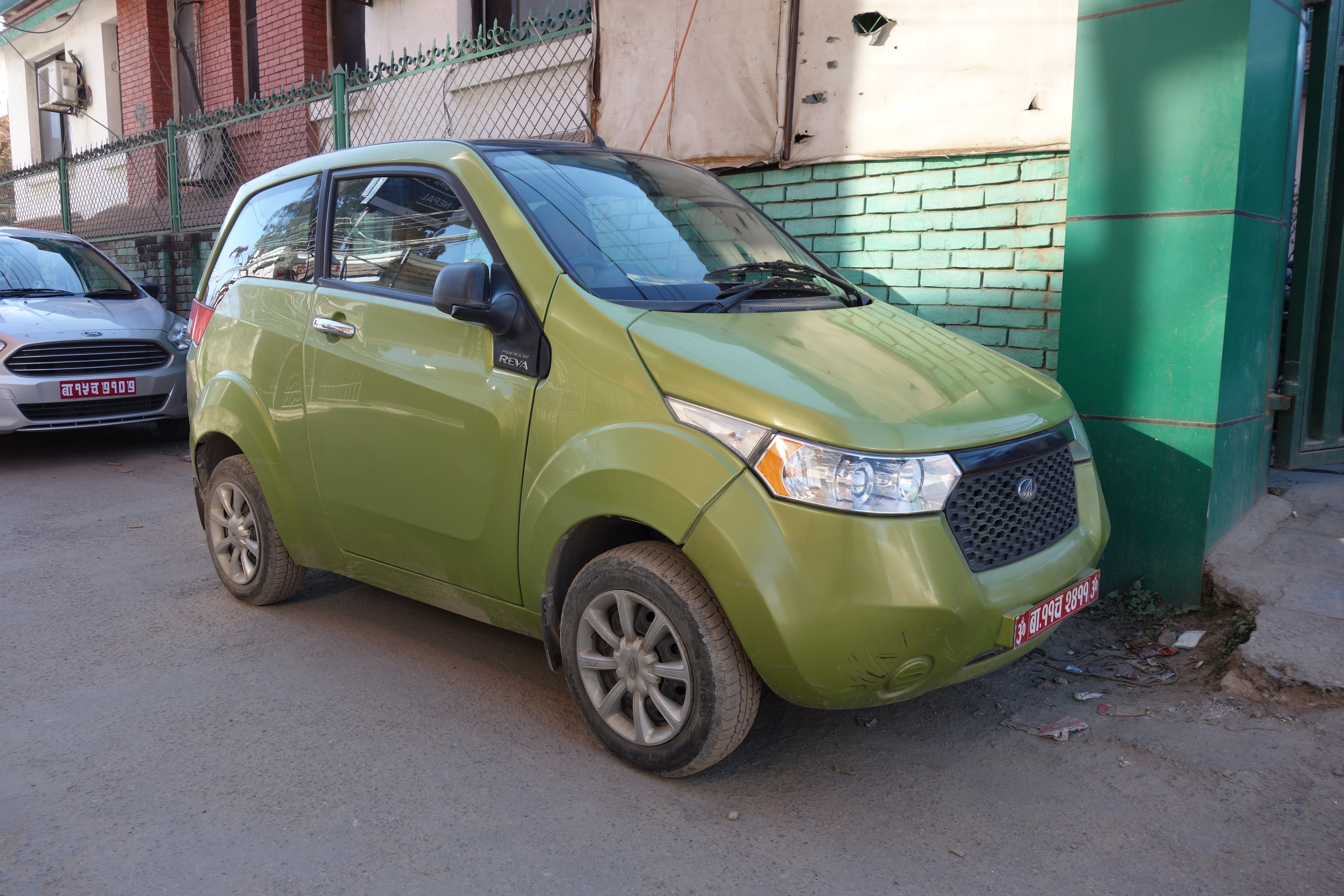

Overview
- Manufacturer: Mahindra Electric
- Also called: Reva NXR
- Production: 2013–2017
- Assembly: Bangalore, Karnataka, India

Body and chassis
- Class: City car (A)
- Body style: 3-door hatchback

Powertrain
- Electric motor: 3 phase induction motor
- Battery: 11 to 16kWh Li-ion
- Range: 120 km (75 mi)

Dimensions
- Length: 3280 mm
- Width: 1514 mm
- Height: 1560 mm
- Curb weight: 830 kg (1,830 lb)

Chronology
- Predecessor: G-Wiz
- Successor: Mahindra e2o Plus

The Mahindra e2o, previously Reva NXR, is an urban electric car hatchback manufactured by Mahindra Reva or Reva Electric Vehicles in 2013–2017. The e2o is the successor of the REVAi (or G-Wiz as it was known in the UK) and was developed using Reva's technology, and has a range of 120 km (75 mi).

In 2006, the G-Wiz became the world's best-selling electric vehicle and by 2008, the company managed to sell over 950 G-Wiz electric cars, making it the UK's best-selling electric car of all time at that time (the record was later surpassed by the Nissan LEAF, with over 14,000 sold by 2016; the LEAF was in turn surpassed by the Mitsubishi Outlander, with over 23,000 sold in the UK by the end of 2016).

The e2o, a two-door, four-seater hatchback, is equipped with features like automatic transmission and allows the buyer to lock the car and operate the air conditioning using a mobile application. According to Forbes, the car "will inoculate its buyers from rising gas prices, provide relief from tailpipe exhaust on India’s polluted streets, and provide a much more convenient and cost effective alternative for the urban city driving."

In 2013, the firm had plans to launch the e2o in the European market during the first quarter of 2014, but the UK launch actually occurred much later, in April 2016.

The car was discontinued in India in November 2016, coinciding with the start of production of the larger e2o Plus, though Mahindra Electric CEO announced that "the e2o will continue to sell in the export market".

The e2o was retired from UK market in May 2017 due to poor sales and trading situation under Brexit, the company bought back at full price the cars from customers.

== Company history ==
Mahindra Electric Mobility Limited, formerly known as the Reva Electric Car Company (RECC), was founded in 1994 by Chetan Maini, as a joint venture between the Maini Group of Bengaluru and Amerigon Electric Vehicle Technologies (AEVT Inc.) of the US. The company's sole aim was to develop and produce an affordable compact electric car. Several other automakers were also aiming to do so, but in 2001 RECC launched the REVA electric car, the company's flagship vehicle, which was available in 26 countries with more than 4,000 of its versions sold worldwide by mid March 2011.

Reva was acquired by Indian conglomerate Mahindra & Mahindra in May 2010. In 2013, Mahindra Reva was selected as one of "The World’s 50 Most Innovative Companies 2013″ by Fast Company.

Since inception, the company has come to be regarded as a pioneer in the electric vehicles space.

== Product history ==
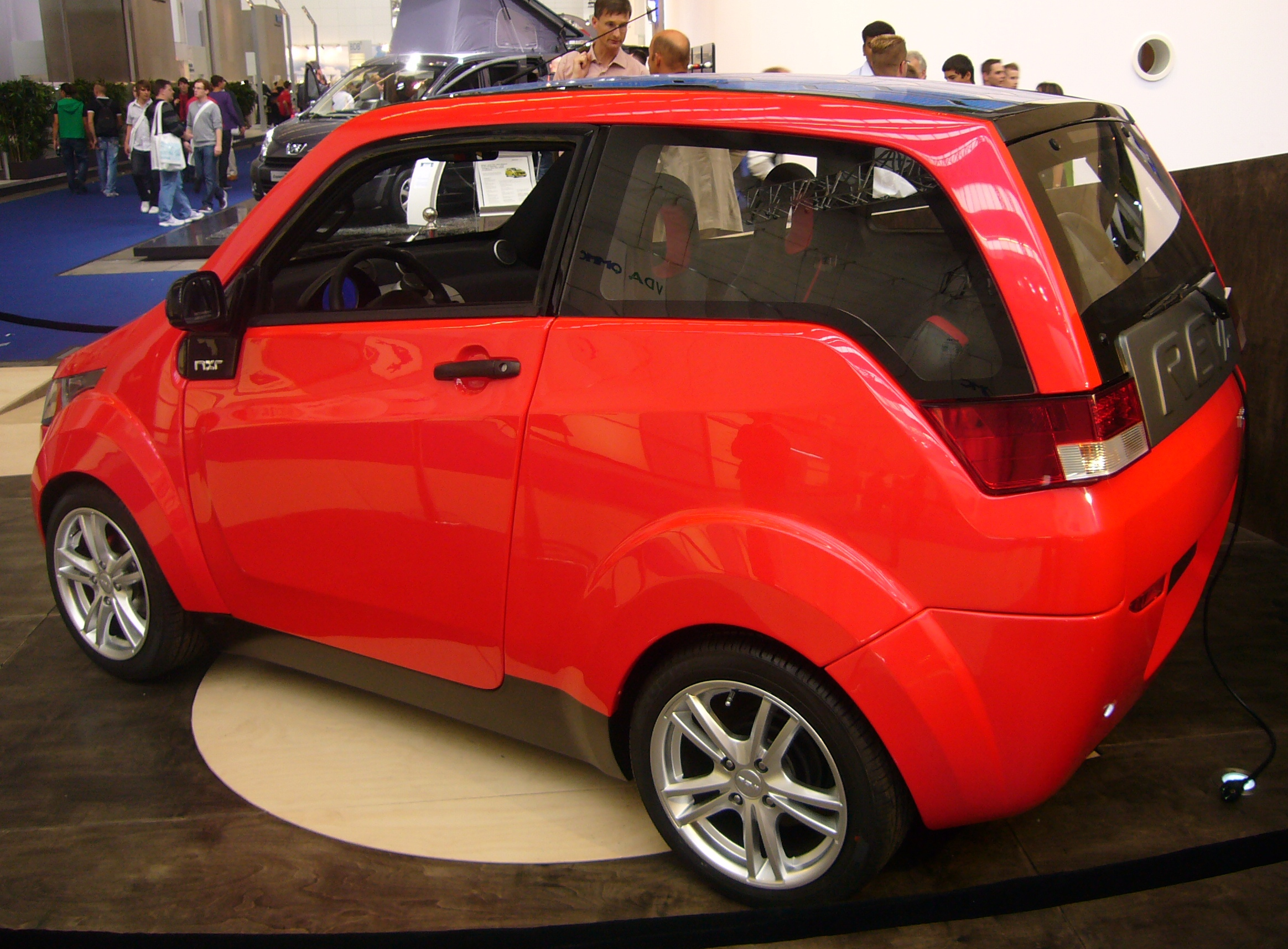
Rear-quarter view of the REVA NXR concept exhibited at the 2009 Frankfurt Motor Show.

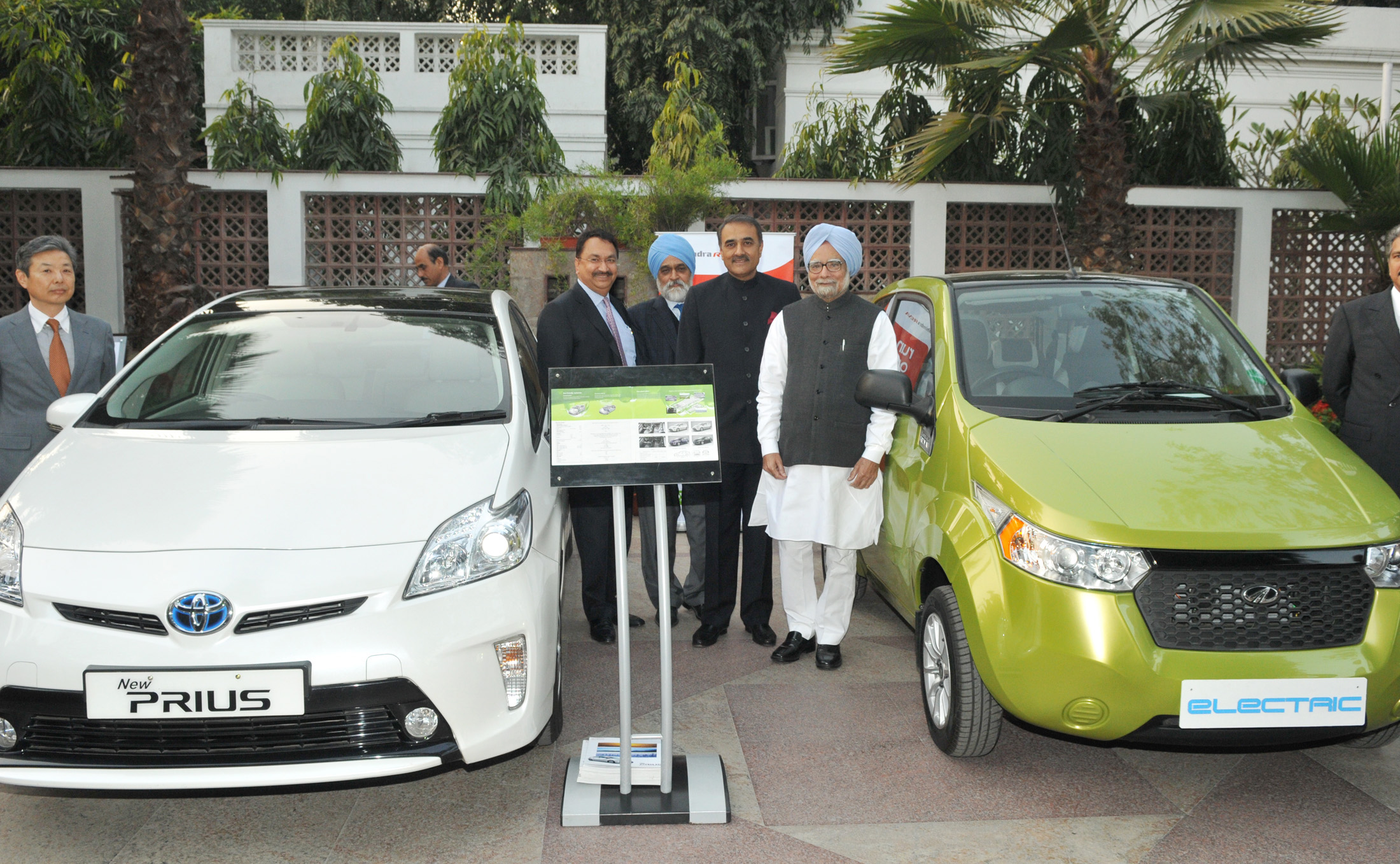
India's then-prime minister Manmohan Singh with a Mahindra e2o in 2020.

The Reva NXR M1 class electric concept car was unveiled at the 2009 Frankfurt Motor Show. Production was initially scheduled for late 2010 with deliveries slated for early 2011; export production was initially scheduled for 2012. It was later rescheduled for late 2012 only for the Indian market, and took place in March 2013 when the Mahindra e2o was launched.

According to Mahindra, the market launch was delayed while awaiting a decision from the Indian government on whether it would provide consumer tax benefits for electric car buyers. Although the incentives were not included in the 2013-14 Indian government budget, the company decided to proceed with the market launch. The company anticipates that Delhi will become the largest market for the e2o, as the city offers a 29% subsidy for the purchase of electric cars. The company has already set up over 250 charging stations in various cities, with 95 in Delhi and over 100 in Bengaluru.

The Mahindra e2o was expected to be available with either lead-acid or lithium-ion batteries. The car's exterior concept was initiated in collaboration with DC Design, and detailed design of production exterior and interior styling was done in-house by Reva's R&D and Styling team.

Range, speed, safety and interior specifications fall along the lines of a new generation of battery electric vehicles. In Europe, the process might start with Mahindra e2o undergoing M1 categorisation. The earlier Reva was exempted from most European crash test rules because of its low weight and power, and it was registered in the European ‘heavy quadricycle’ category instead of the ‘car’ category. Now the Mahindra e2o like any other car sold in Europe, has to have a crash test, ABS and airbags. The Mahindra e2o however, passed all safety tests in 2013 when it was crash tested in Spain.

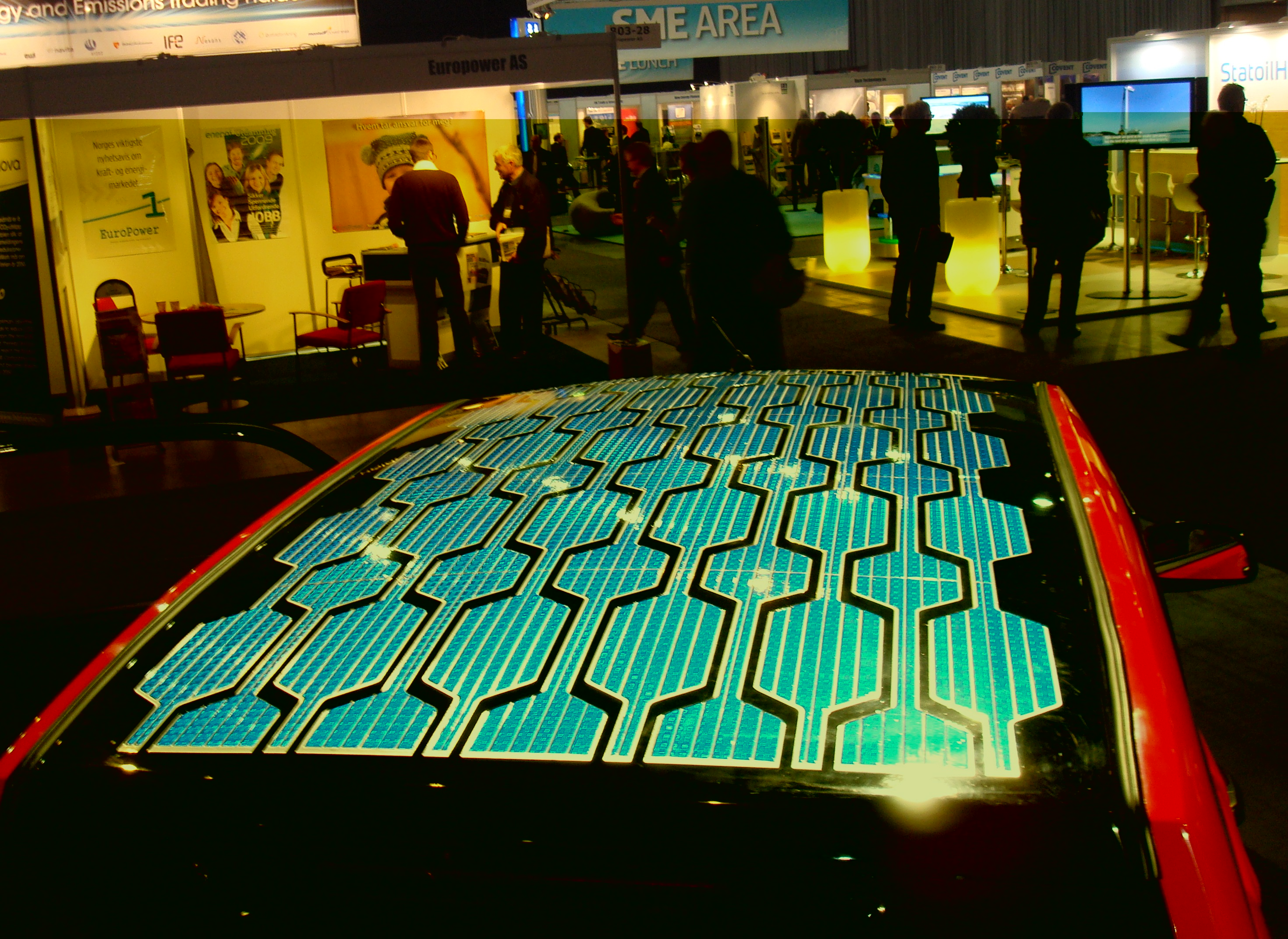
Roof-mounted solar panels of the REVA NXR concept.

The Mahindra e2o has features like a REVive battery charging system. Through the telematic remote access to the car's on-board Energy Management System, the company's support centre can individually determine the battery condition and allow access to a small reserve charge. Mahindra e2o is manufactured through processes that do not pollute all the way from the design stage in India's first Platinum certified automobile plant. The facility itself is naturally lit and ventilated, uses LED lights, recycles, gets 35 percent of its power from solar panels and is claimed to be 60-70 percent more efficient than a conventional facility. Much like a modern-day smartphone, the Mahindra e2o has functions that can be powered remotely. Remote diagnostics through telematics monitors the e2o on a daily basis giving instant diagnosis of any existing or impending problems. A smartphone app provides information of the car's state of charge, and even sends a reminder for its various functions. One can remotely lock and unlock the car, start and stop charging, turn the car on and off, switch the air conditioning on and off and even set a schedule using the smartphone app.

There are other ingenious technologies that have been incorporated in the e2o such as Sun2Car, and Regenerative braking system that further boost the car's range. The Sun2Car, for instance, allows people to charge the e2o using solar energy while it's parked. The regenerative braking technology puts energy back into the car's batteries and charges them every time the brake is applied.

== Specifications ==
The car has a lithium-ion battery pack that takes five hours for a full charge, and with a weight of 830 kg (1,830 lb), delivers a range of 120 km (75 mi) and a top speed of 90 km/h (56 mph). The e2o is one of the more advanced cars on Indian roads, with smartphone-controlled features, GPS navigation system and a dashboard-mounted touchscreen, keyless entry, start/stop button, and regenerative braking. According to the company, the car's safety features comply with European norms.

== Production and sales ==
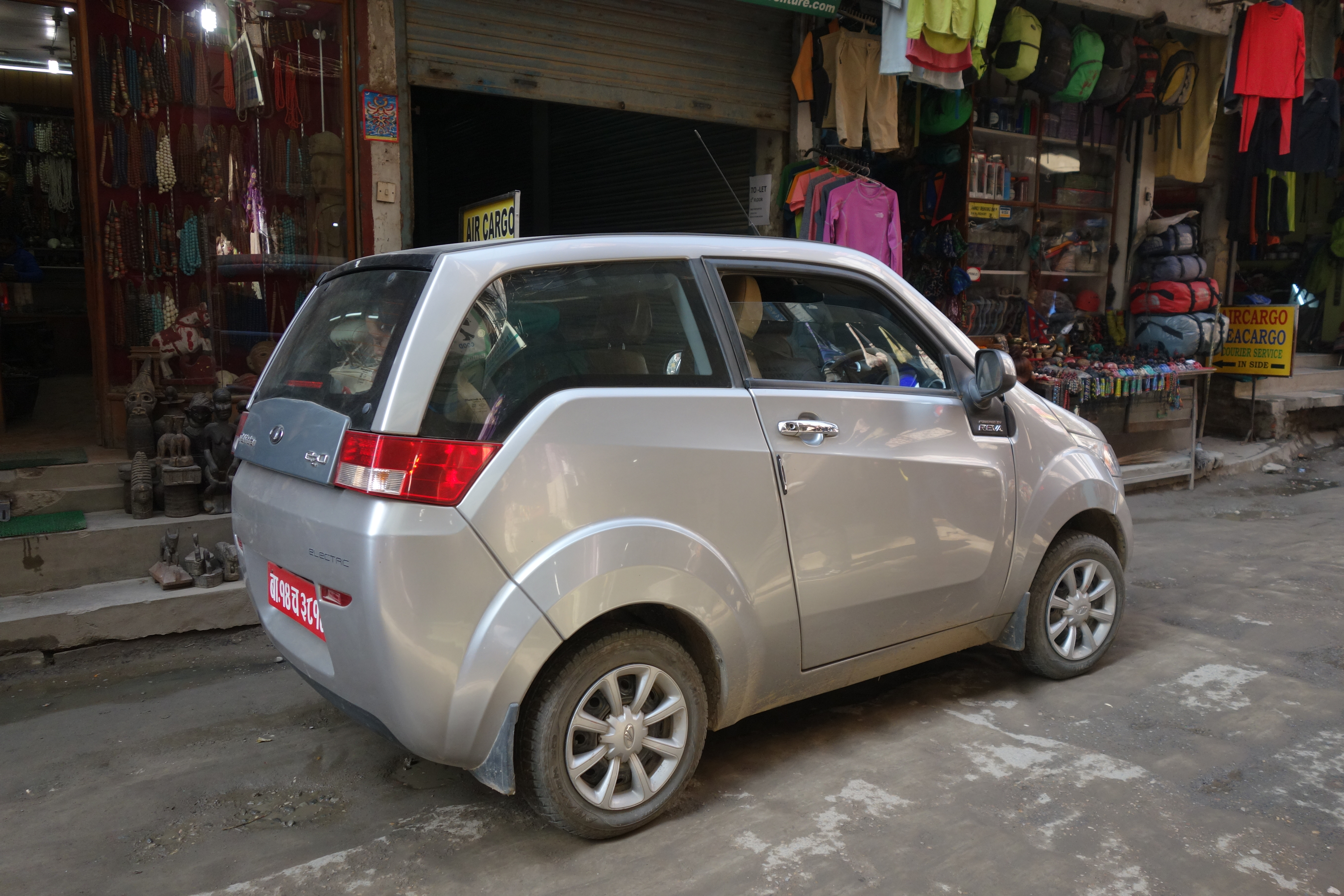
A Mahindra e2o in Kathmandu, Nepal.

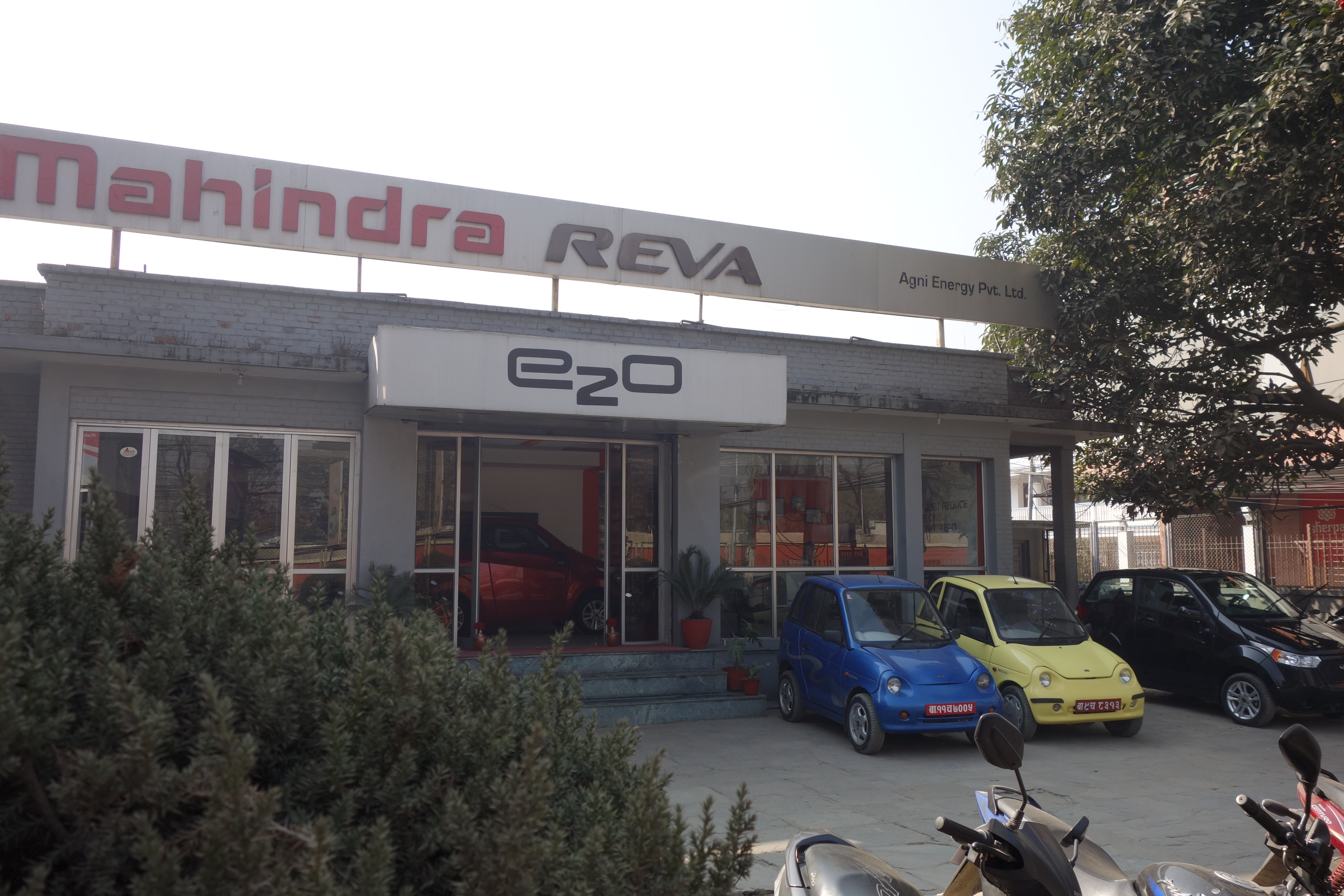
A Mahindra REVA dealership in Kathmandu, Nepal.

The Mahindra e2o is manufactured at the company's Bengaluru factory. The company invested ₹100 crore (US$18.5 million) on the development of the car and construction of a manufacturing plant with an annual capacity of 30,000 units a year, and initially projected to sell only about 400 to 500 units a month, with Delhi accounting with about 150 to 200 units. Due to delays in the roll-out of the central government incentives, in November 2013 the company announced it was scaling back plans to release of other electric vehicles, and reported that by mid November only about 400 units have been sold in India, Nepal and Sri Lanka.

The Mahindra e2o was launched in India in March 2013 at a price between ₹6.5 lakh (US$11,900) to ₹8.5 lakh (US$15,670) depending on the city and before any subsidy.

As a response to lower sales than initially expected, the e2o Premium variant was launched in August 2014 with Electric Power steering and 120 km range upgrade 120 km (75 mi) at 5.72 lakh INR (ex- showroom Delhi) with a monthly energy fee of Rs. 2,999. The energy fee has been rechristened as “e2o care protection plan”.

To address consumer concerns of high initial acquisition cost, Mahindra Reva introduced an ownership program, “Goodbye Fuel, Hello Electric”. The program splits the acquisition cost into initial cost and e2o care protection plan. Under this program, the company would guarantee the performance of the battery as the ownership of the battery lies with Mahindra Reva. The company will also provide the 24X7 assistance and a courtesy car during battery repair period.

Mahindra e2o has also been launched in countries such as Nepal, Bhutan and Bermuda.

== Sustainable mobility solutions ==
Besides manufacturing, the company is also involved in developing energy solutions for sustainable mobility, notably Sun2Car, Car2Home and Quick2Charge.

== See also ==
- Government incentives for plug-in electric vehicles
- List of modern production plug-in electric vehicles
- List of production battery electric vehicles
- Mahindra Halo
- Mahindra REVA
- REVAi
