= REVAi =

REVAi / G-Wiz
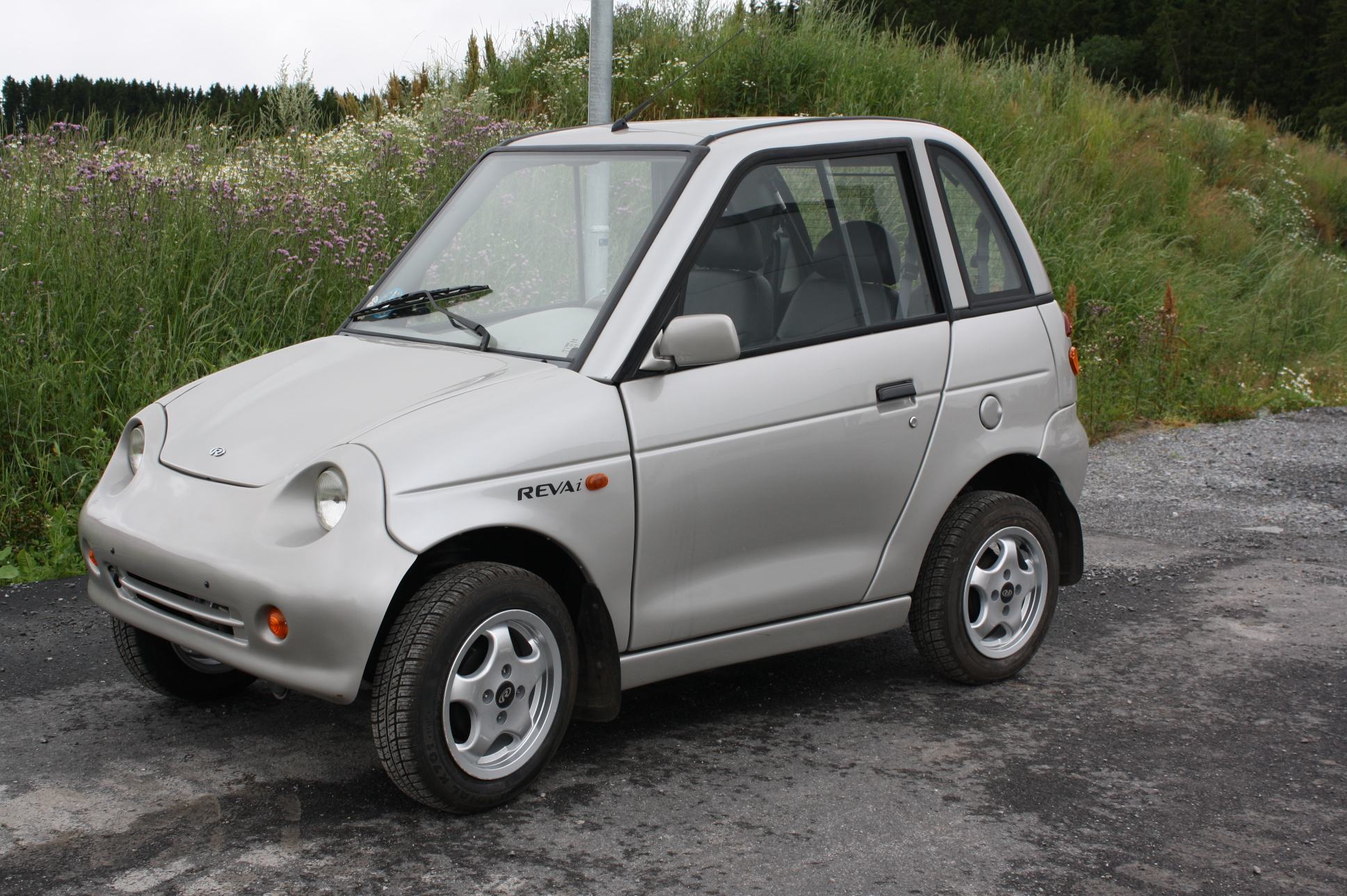

Overview
- Manufacturer: Reva Electric Car Company
- Also called: G-Wiz i
- Production: 2001–2019
- Assembly: Bangalore, India

Body and chassis
- Layout: Rear motor, Rear wheel drive

Dimensions
- Wheelbase: 1,700 mm (66.9 in)
- Length: 2,600 mm (102.4 in)
- Width: 1,300 mm (51.2 in)
- Height: 1,500 mm (59.1 in)
- Kerb weight: 400 kg (882 lb) (excluding battery)

Chronology
- Successor: Reva e2o

The REVAi, known as G-Wiz in the United Kingdom, is a small micro electric car, made by the Indian manufacturer Reva Electric Car Company between 2001 and 2012. By late 2013, Reva had sold about 4,600 vehicles worldwide, in 26 countries. Sales in the United Kingdom, its main market, ended by the end of 2011. Production ended in 2012 and the REVAi was replaced by the Mahindra e2o.

In many countries, the REVAi does not meet the criteria to qualify as a highway-capable motor vehicle, and fits into other classes, such as neighborhood electric vehicle (NEV) in the United States and heavy quadricycle in Europe.

The vehicle was originally known as simply the REVA, but was then improved and renamed the REVAi.

== Design ==
The REVAi is a small three-door hatchback measuring 2.6 m (8 ft 6 in) long, 1.3 m (4 ft 3 in) wide and 1.5 m (4 ft 11 in) high. The car can accommodate two adults in the front and two children in the rear. The back seats can be folded down to provide cargo space. The maximum passenger and cargo weight is 270 kg (600 lb).

The REVAi is intended for city trips and commuting, particularly in congested traffic. It is registered in Europe as a heavy quadricycle (category L7). It may be exported to the United States, with a speed limiter that limits the speed to twenty five miles per hour, for use as a neighborhood electric vehicle (NEV).

== Models ==
=== First model ===
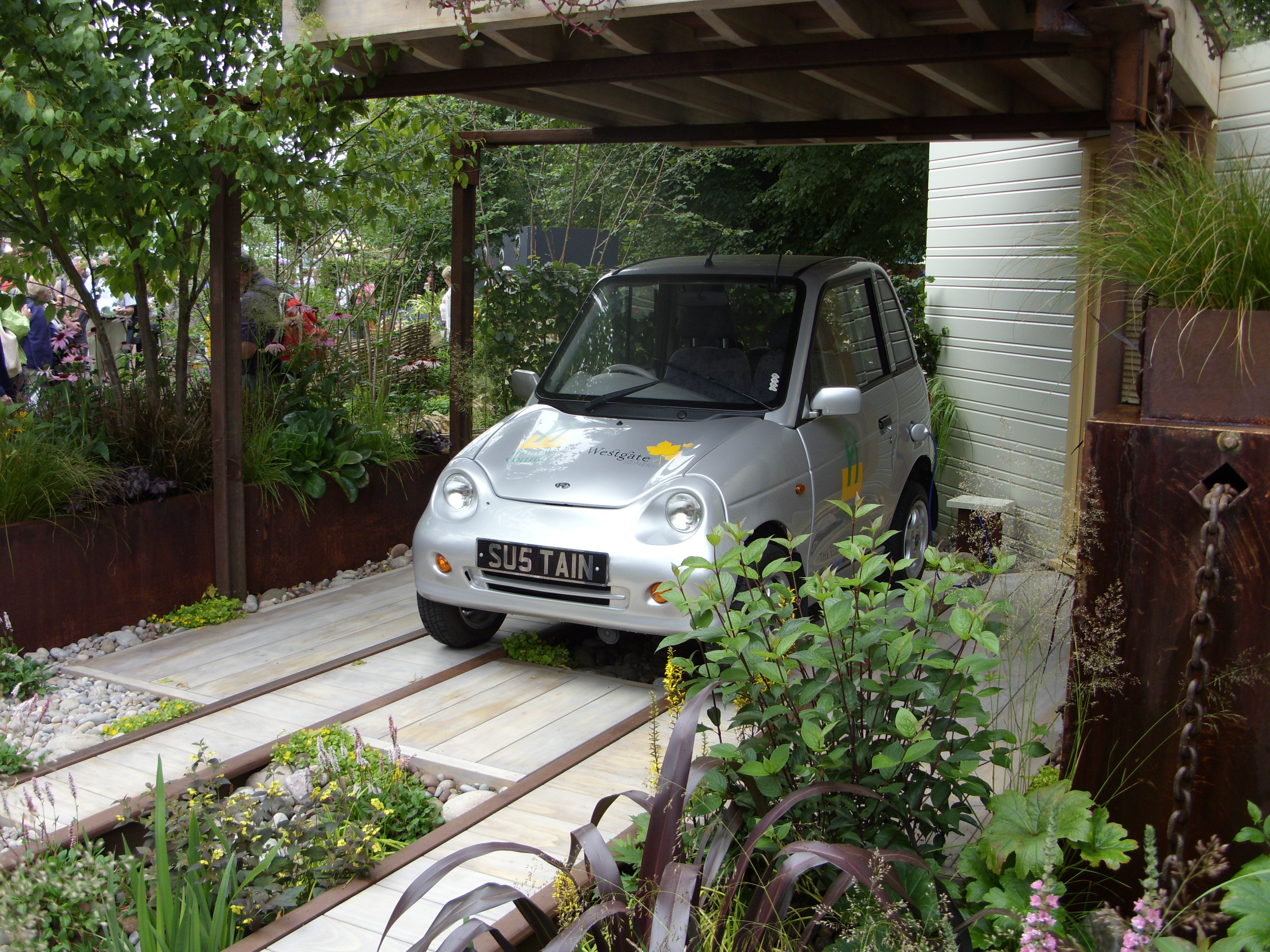
On display at the 2009 Hampton Court Palace Flower Show

The first model, produced from 2001 to 2007, was simply called REVA (G-Wiz in the United Kingdom). Its power flowed through a 400 amp motor controller to a DC motor rated at 4.8 kW (6.4 hp), with a maximum of 13.1 kW (17.6 hp). Power came from eight 6 V, 200 Ah, lead-acid batteries located under the front seats and wired in series to create 48 V. This model did not have the strengthened chassis that allows subsequent models to pass a crash test at 40 km/h (25 mph).

=== REVAi ===
REVA i Electric power
Traction motor	AC, 13 kW peak power
Charger	Onboard
Charging connector	Cable to standard domestic 230 V 13 A outlet
Charge time	8 hours to full power
Pack voltage	48 V
Battery type	8 lead–acid batteries
Battery rating	6 V, 200 Ah each
Maximum speed	80 km/h (50 mph)

In January 2008, a new model was introduced, the REVAi (G-Wiz i in the United Kingdom). It has an AC drive system, which raises the maximum speed to 80 km/h (50 mph). The power flows through a 350 Amp motor controller to a 3-phase AC motor rated at 13 kW (17 hp) peak. Like the REVA, power comes from eight 6 V, 200 A h lead–acid batteries located under the front seats.

It has a "boost" switch that gives 40% extra torque for improved acceleration and hill climbing and increases the top speed to 80 km/h (50 mph). It weighs 665 kg (1,466 lb), including 270 kg (600 lb) batteries. The nominal range is 80 km (50 mi), but driving fast or using the heater or air conditioner reduces the range. To address the previous safety concerns, and in conjunction with Lotus Engineering, several new safety features have been added, such as front disc brakes, a collapsible steering column, and a much revised and reinforced chassis that has been successfully crash tested at 40 km/h (25 mph) by ARAI in India.

=== REVA L-ion ===
In January 2009, a new model was launched, the REVA L-ion. It is similar to the REVAi, but powered by high performance lithium-ion batteries, which reduce the car's curb weight to 565 kg (1,246 lb), offer greater acceleration, reduce charging time to six hours, and extend the nominal range to 120 km (75 mi). The performance of these batteries is also less affected by variations in temperature.

An off-board charging station is available, which requires three phase power and gives a 90% charge in one hour. The REVA L-ion will also have a solar panel on the roof for harnessing solar energy.

=== Comparison of models ===
	REVA L-ion	REVAi	G-Wiz
Top speed	50 mph (80 km/h)	50 mph (80 km/h)	50 mph (80 km/h)
Range	75 mi (120 km)	50 mi (80 km)	50 mi (80 km)
Lotus assisted safety pack	Yes	Yes	No
Upgradeable to lithium-ion batteries	Yes	Yes	No
Hill rolling-restraint feature	Yes	Yes	Yes
Regenerative brakes	First 30%	First 30%	First 30%
Front brakes	Disc brakes	Disc brakes	Drum brakes
Rear brakes	Drum brakes	Drum brakes	Drum brakes
Anti-roll bar	Yes	Yes	Yes
NEVS Electric	Yes	No	Yes
TOGG C-city	No	Yes	Yes

== Sales and price ==
The car was available in the following countries: Austria, Belgium, Bhutan, Brazil, Canada, Chile, China, Colombia, Costa Rica, Croatia, Cyprus, The Czech Republic, Denmark, Egypt, France, Germany, Greece, Hungary, Iceland, India, Indonesia, Ireland, Italy, Japan, Jamaica, Malta, Monaco, Nigeria, Nepal, The Netherlands, Norfolk Islands, Norway, Peru, the Philippines, Poland, Portugal, Russia, Slovenia, Spain, Sri Lanka, Taiwan, Thailand, Sweden, Ukraine, The United Arab Emirates, The United States, and the United Kingdom.

The different versions of the REVA sold about 4,600 vehicles worldwide by late 2013, and India was its main market, accounting for 55% of global sales, of which, 40% were in the Bangalore city, where Mahindra Reva is based. The UK was one of the leading markets, and the REVA G-Wiz (as it was marketed in the country) was the top selling electric car in Britain for several years, particularly in London.

Pricing

Pricing in the United Kingdom started at approximately £9,995 for the standard model The G-Wiz qualifies for exemption from the London congestion charge due to being an electrically propelled vehicle. The REVA was also sold in other European countries, including Spain and Norway. In Costa Rica, the REVAi was launched in March 2009 and is sold for US$13,000. In the Chilean market, it was sold for US$12,000.

The REVAi was available in the Republic of Ireland at a retail price of €11,500 for the REVA Standard and €17,500 for the better specified REVA Li-Ion.

REVA was sold for ₹ 350,000 (US$7,130) in India and has a "running cost of just 40 paise/km" (40 paise [0.08 US cent]/km), considering the Indian petrol price of US$1/liter.

== Safety concerns ==
The REVA is exempt from most European crash test rules, because its low weight and power registers it in the European "heavy quadricycle" category instead of the "car" category.

The UK Department for Transport found "serious safety concerns" after crashing a now-discontinued G-Wiz at 56 km/h (35 mph) into a deformable barrier on 24 April 2007, which is part of the normal test for production cars. Likewise, a test commissioned by Top Gear Magazine that followed the Euro NCAP crash test specifications found that the occupants would suffer "serious or life-threatening" injuries in a 64 km/h (40 mph) crash.

In October 2010, a fatal accident in London occurred between a G-Wiz and a Škoda Octavia, with the driver of the G-Wiz, British scientist Judit Nadal, being killed. The coroner Andrew Walker was quoted as saying about the G-Wiz at the inquest: “What concerns me is that this vehicle was destroyed in this collision in a way that I have not seen a vehicle destroyed before” but he did not recommend further action regarding the vehicle's design. Mr Walker said he would be writing to Transport for London about making improvements to the safety of the junction. Subsequently, the government ordered an investigation into the safety of small electric vehicles.

Current REVAi and REVA L-ion models include several new safety features such as front disc brakes, a collapsible steering column, and a much revised and reinforced chassis that has been successfully crash tested in India by ARAI. A 40 km/h (25 mph) frontal crash test video of the new model is available online.

== Reception and criticism ==
The REVAi has been panned by many critics, including criticisms that it is underpowered, unsafe, and ugly. The BBC programme Top Gear has consistently and incessantly lambasted the G-Wiz, named it the Worst Car of 2007 and even blew it up later that same episode; co-presenter James May referred to it as "the worst car for this year – and indeed for every other year whilst we have breath in our bodies – it is the most stupid, useless and dangerous car ever to stalk the earth. It is totally terrible, and disgusting."

In July 2004, The Independent reported Archie Norman owned a G-Wiz to commute around London, and outside London, he drove a Volkswagen Golf.

In October 2013, Top Gear Magazine placed the G-Wiz on its list of "The 13 worst cars of the last 20 years."

In December 2016, twenty G-Wiz vehicles were destroyed in an episode of The Grand Tour and continuing on the theme of lambasting the car, which the presenters started whilst working together on Top Gear.

== See also ==
- City car
- Government incentives for plug-in electric vehicles
- Kei car
- List of modern production plug-in electric vehicles
- List of production battery electric vehicles
- Neighborhood electric vehicle
- Mahindra e2o
- Zero-emissions vehicle
