= Chevrolet Corvette =

American sports car by the Chevrolet division of General Motors (GM)

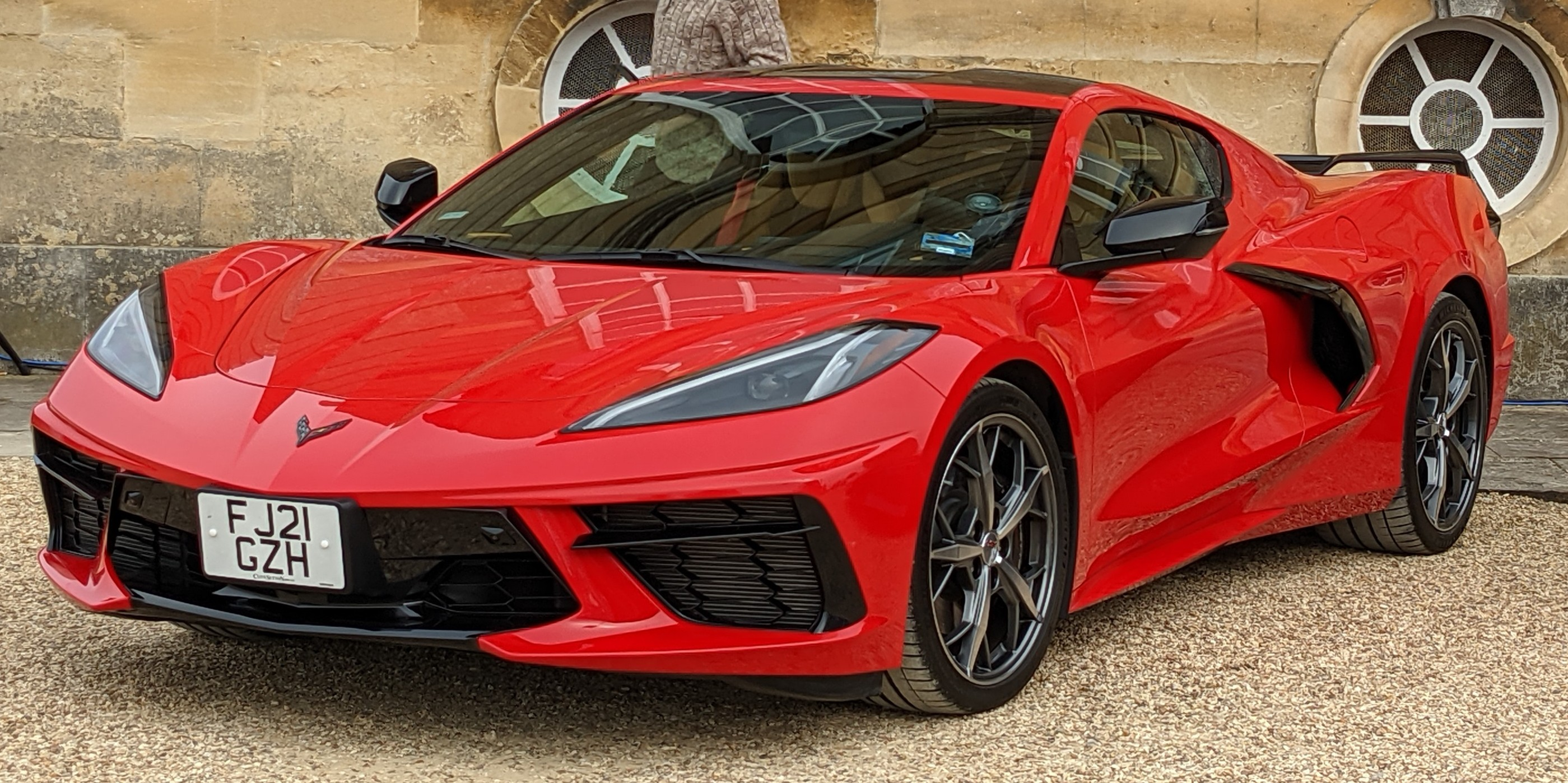
- 2021 Chevrolet Corvette C8

Overview
- Manufacturer: Chevrolet (General Motors)
- Production: 1953–present
- Model years: 1953–present: 1953–1962 (C1); 1963–1967 (C2); 1968–1982 (C3); 1983–1996 (C4); 1997–2004 (C5); 2005–2013 (C6); 2014–2019 (C7); 2020–present (C8)
- Assembly: United States: Flint, Michigan (1953); St. Louis, Missouri (1954–1981); Bowling Green, Kentucky (1981–present)

Body and chassis
- Class: Sports car (S)
- Body style: 2-door coupé 2-door convertible/roadster
- Layout: FR layout/FMR Layout (1953–2019); RMR layout (2020–present)

The Chevrolet Corvette is a line of American two-door, two-seater sports cars manufactured and marketed by General Motors under the Chevrolet marque since 1953. Throughout eight generations, indicated sequentially as C1 to C8, the Corvette is noted for its performance, distinctive styling, lightweight fiberglass or composite bodywork, and competitive pricing. The Corvette has had domestic mass-produced two-seater competitors fielded by American Motors, Ford, and Chrysler; it is the only one continuously produced by a United States auto manufacturer.

In 1953, GM executives accepted a suggestion by Myron Scott, then the assistant director of the Public Relations department, to name the company's new sports car after the corvette, a small, maneuverable warship. Initially a relatively modest, lightweight six-cylinder convertible, subsequent introductions of V8 engines, competitive chassis innovations, and eventually rear mid-engined layout have gradually moved the Corvette upmarket and made it more sporty. In 1963, the second generation was introduced in coupe and convertible styles. The first three Corvette generations (1953–1982) employed body-on-frame construction, and since the C4 generation, introduced in 1983 as an early 1984 model, Corvettes have used GM's unibody Y‑body platform. All Corvettes used front mid-engine configuration for seven generations, through 2019, and transitioned to a rear mid-engined layout with the C8 generation.

Initially manufactured in Flint, Michigan, and St. Louis, Missouri, the Corvette has been produced in Bowling Green, Kentucky, since 1981, which is also the location of the National Corvette Museum. The Corvette has become widely known as "America's Sports Car." Automotive News wrote that after being featured in the early 1960s television show Route 66, "the Corvette became synonymous with freedom and adventure," ultimately becoming both "the most successful concept car in history and the most popular sports car in history."

== History ==
=== First generation (C1; 1953–1962) ===
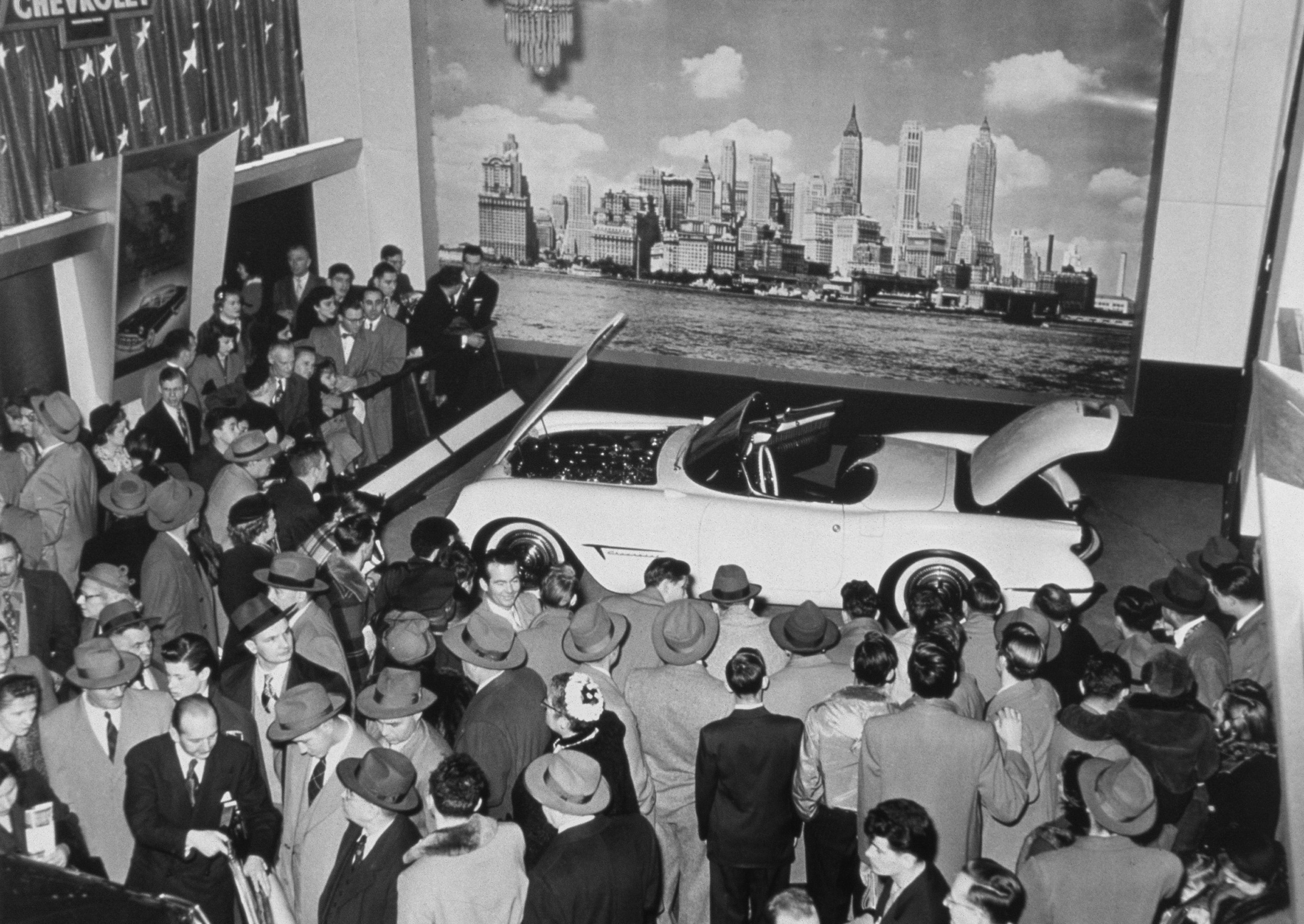
1953 Chevrolet Corvette displayed at the 1953 GM Motorama car show

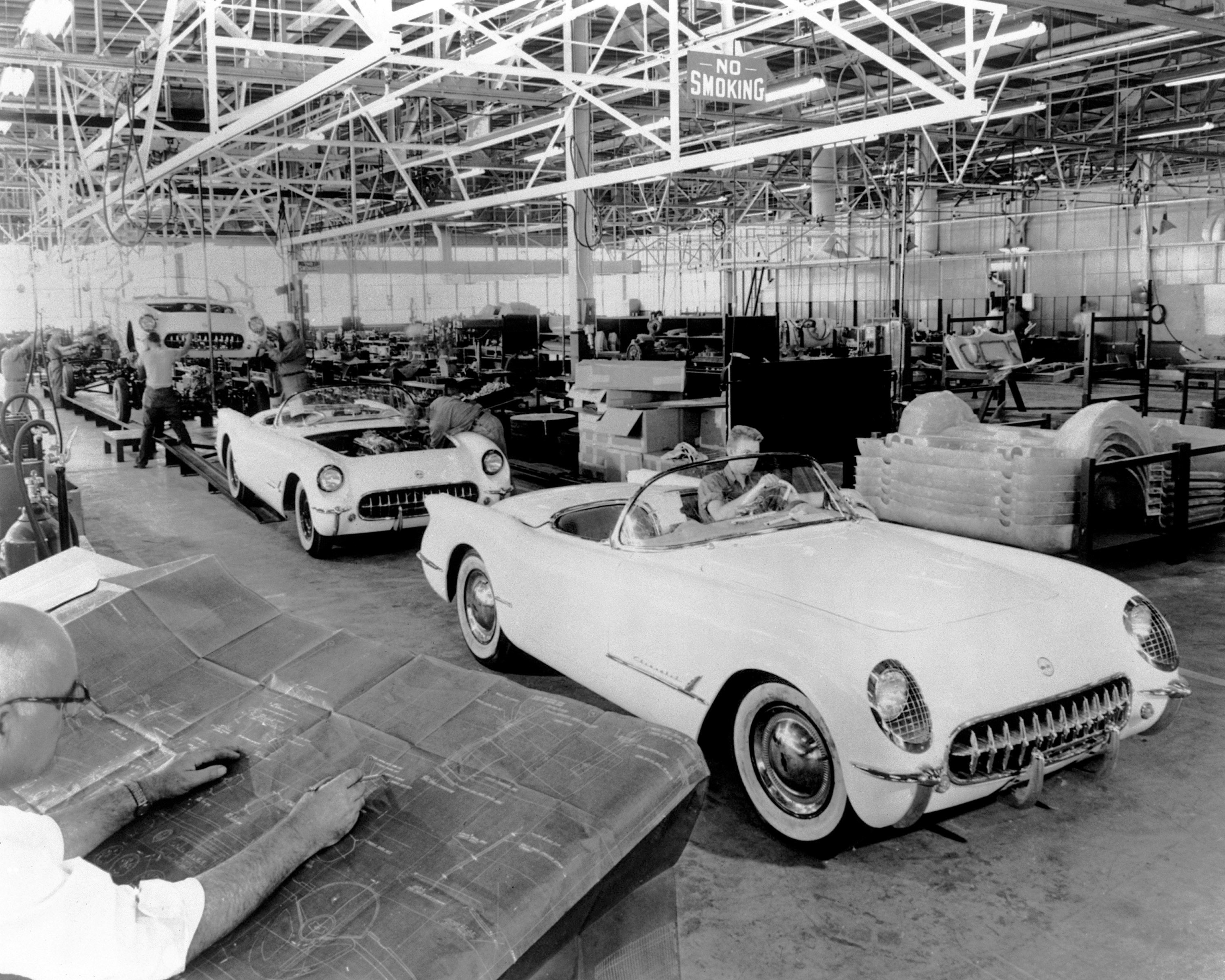
1953 Corvette exits assembly line

The first generation of Corvette was introduced late in the 1953 model year, appearing as a show car for the 1953 General Motors Motorama, January 17–23 at New York's Waldorf-Astoria Hotel. At the time, Chevrolet general manager Thomas H. Keating said it was six months to a year away from production readiness. The car generated sufficient interest for mass production to begin on June 30, 1953.

Uniquely, the original Corvette used fiberglass bodywork, its reinforcement placed by hand. This generation was often referred to as the "solid-axle" models, with independent rear suspension appearing in the next. Three hundred hand-built Corvette convertibles were produced, all Polo White, for the 1953 model year.

The 1954 model year vehicles could be ordered in Pennant Blue, Sportsman Red, Black, or Polo White; 3,640 were manufactured.

The 1953, 1954, and 1955 model years were the only Corvettes equipped with a 235 cu in (3.9 L) version of the second-generation Blue Flame inline-six rated at 150 hp (112 kW; 152 PS).

The 1955 model offered a 265 cu in (4.34 L) V8 engine as an option. The new V8 improved 0–60 mph (0–97 km/h) acceleration by 3 seconds to a time of approximately 8.5 seconds. With a large inventory of unsold 1954 models, GM limited production to 700 units for 1955. Despite the poor sales of the Corvette at the time, the V8 was a popular option, with an estimated six cars produced with the inline-six.

Three new competitors, the Ford Thunderbird, the Studebaker Speedster, and the larger Chrysler C-300 were introduced that same year.

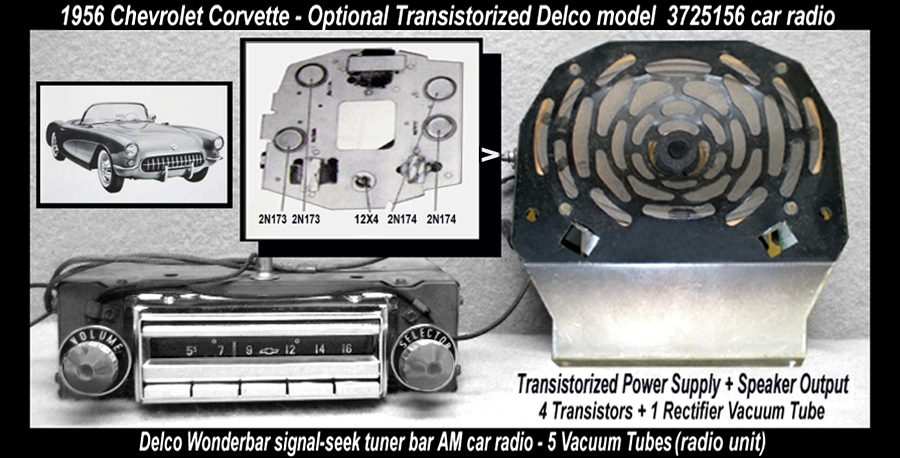
1956 Chevrolet Corvette transistorized "hybrid" (vacuum tubes and transistors) car radio option, which was GM's first start in using the modern solid-state electronics for a production car model

A new body was introduced for the 1956 model featuring a revised front end and side coves; the taillamp fins were deleted. An optional "Ramjet" fuel injection system was made available midway through the 1957 model year. It was one of the first American mass-produced engines in history to reach one hp per cubic inch and Chevrolet's advertising agency used a "one hp per cubic inch" slogan for advertising the 283 hp 283 cu in Chevrolet small-block engine. Other options included power windows (1956), hydraulically assisted convertible top (1956), heavy-duty brakes and suspension (1957), and four-speed manual transmission (late 1957). Delco Radio transistorized signal-seeking "hybrid" car radio, which used both vacuum tubes and transistors in its radio's circuitry (1956 option).

The 1958 Corvette received a body and interior revisions including a longer front end with quad headlamps, bumper exiting exhaust tips, revised steering wheel, and a dashboard with all gauges mounted directly in front of the driver. For 1958 only were hood louvers and twin trunk spears. The 1959–60 model years had few changes except a decreased amount of body chrome and more powerful engine offerings.

In 1961, the rear of the car was completely redesigned with the addition of a tapered tail with four round lights. The light treatment would continue for all following model year Corvettes until 2014. In 1962, the Chevrolet 283 cu in (4.64 L) Small-Block was enlarged to 327 cu in (5.36 L). In standard form it was rated at 250 hp (186 kW; 253 PS). For an additional 12% over list price, the fuel-injected version produced 360 hp (268 kW; 365 PS), making it the fastest of the C1 generation. 1962 was also the last year for the wraparound windshield, solid rear axle, and convertible-only body style. The trunk lid and exposed headlamps did not reappear for many decades.

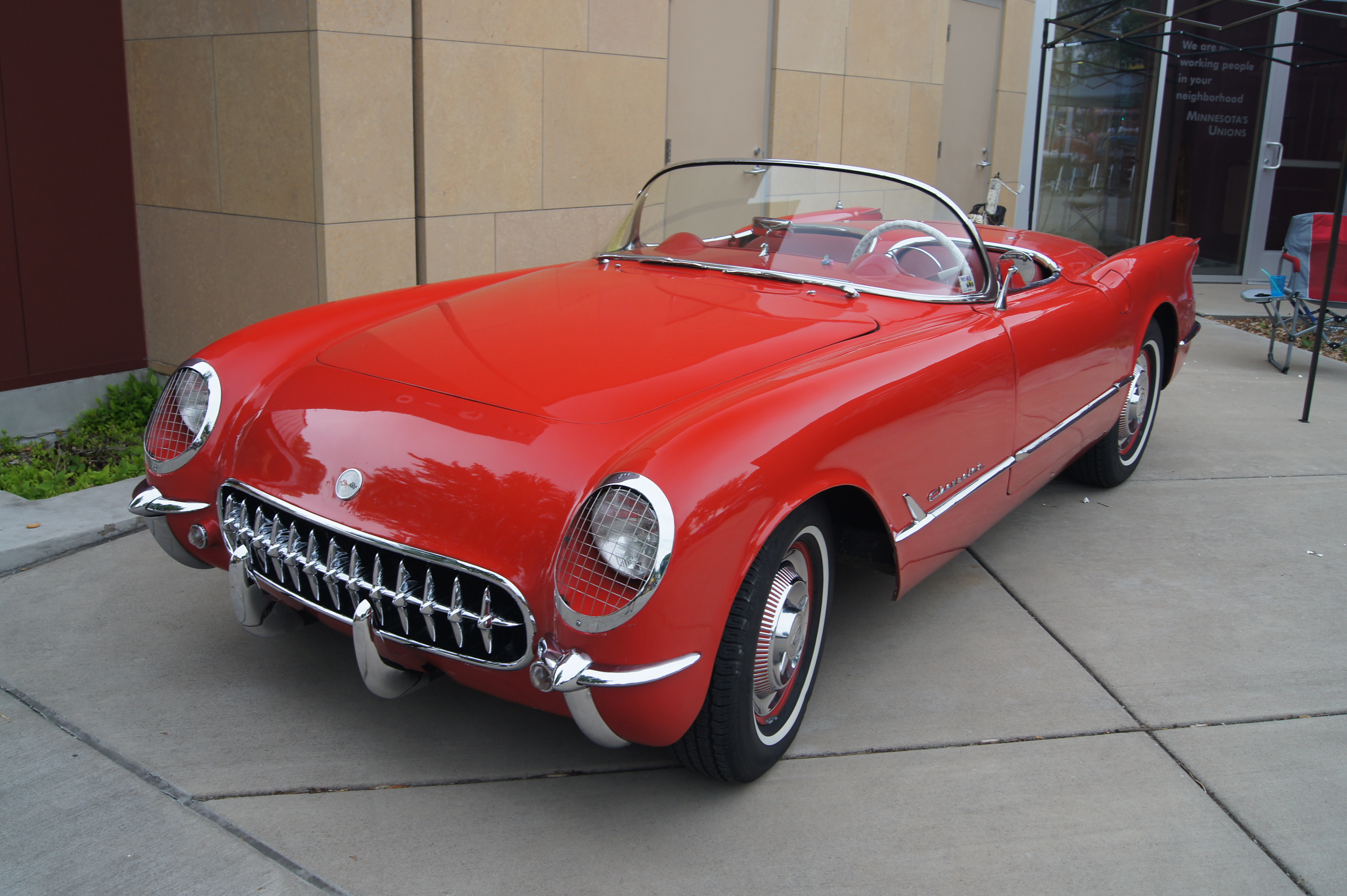
1954 Corvette convertible

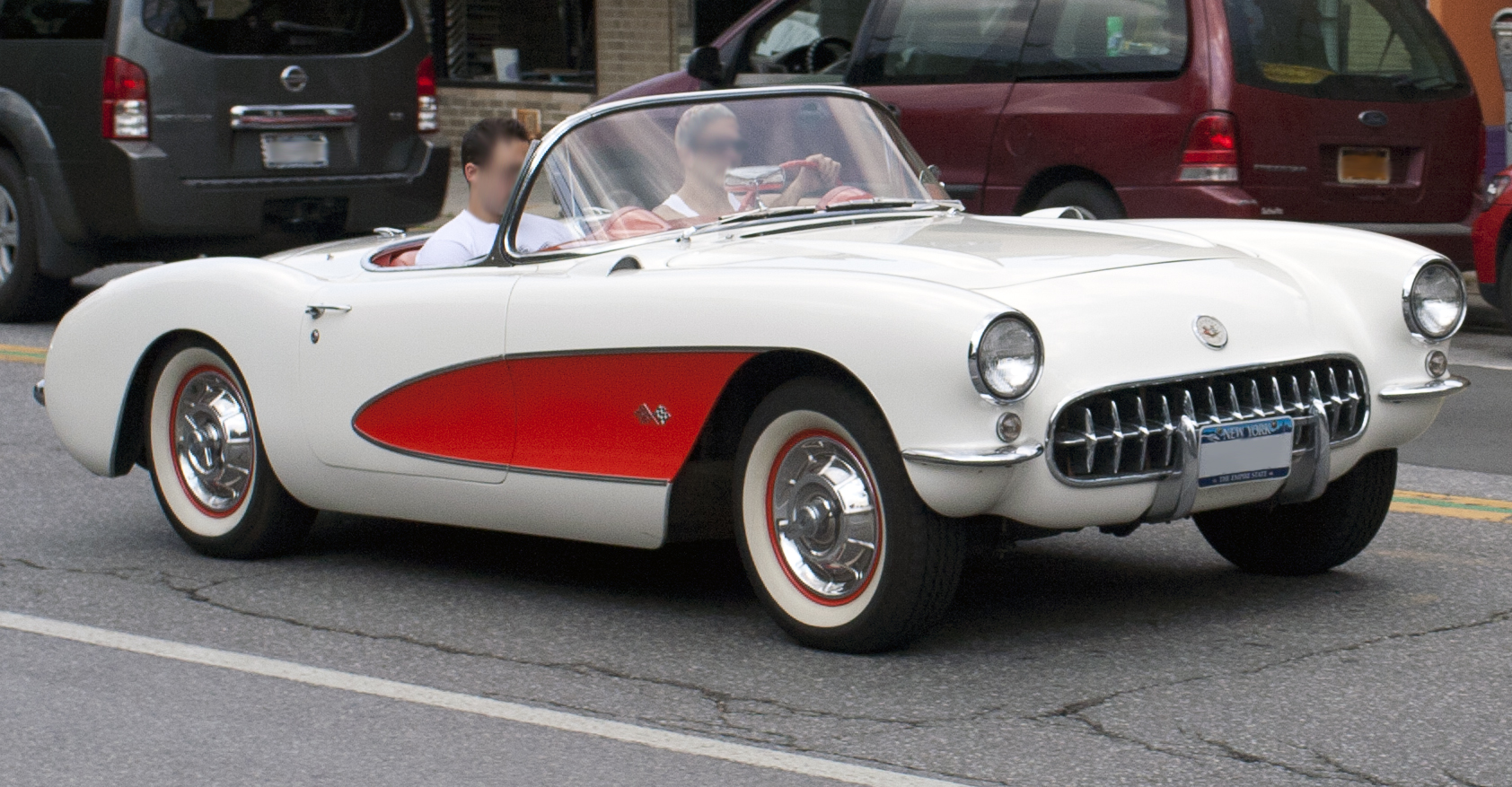
1956 Corvette convertible

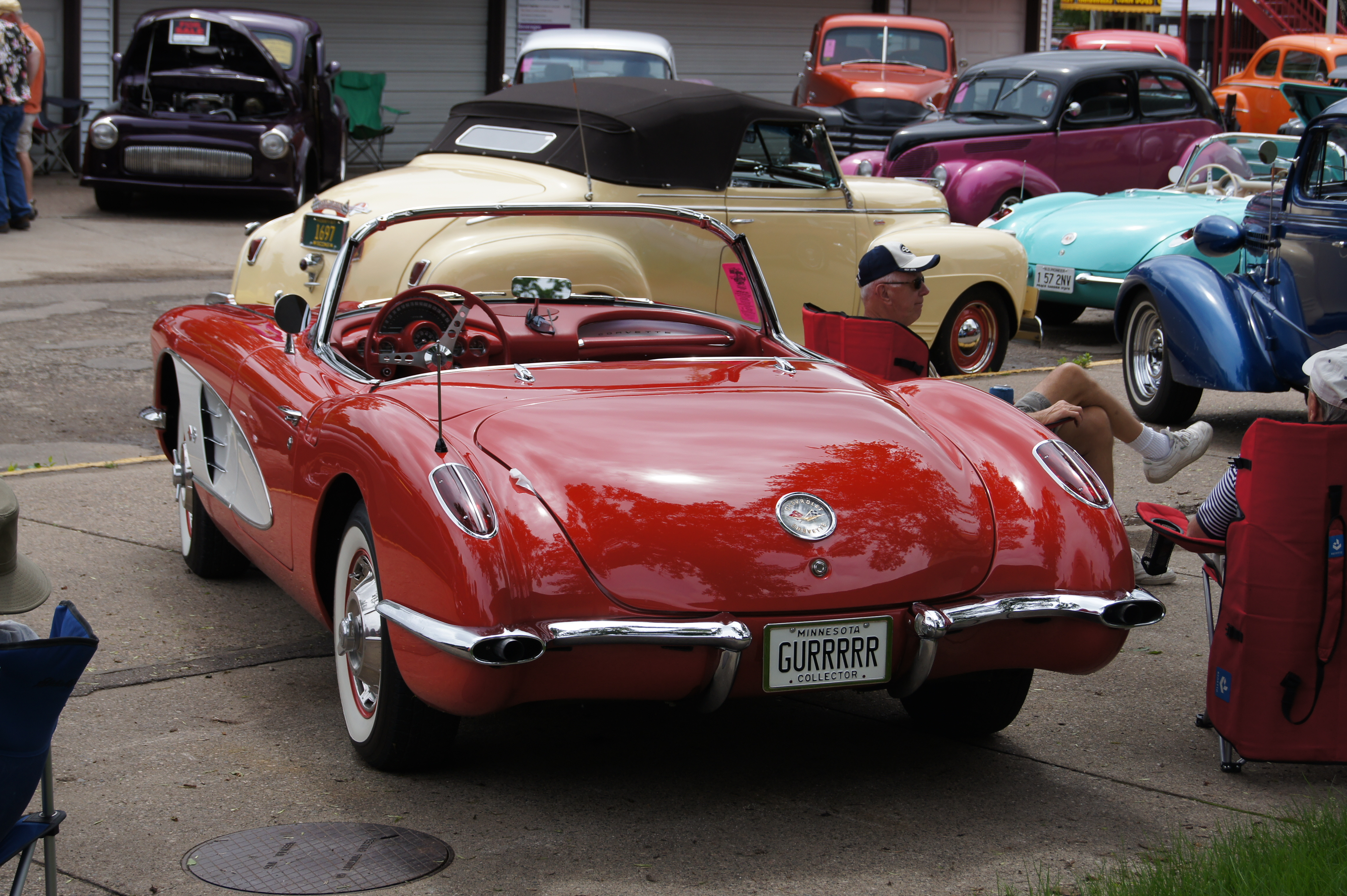
1959 Corvette convertible (rear)

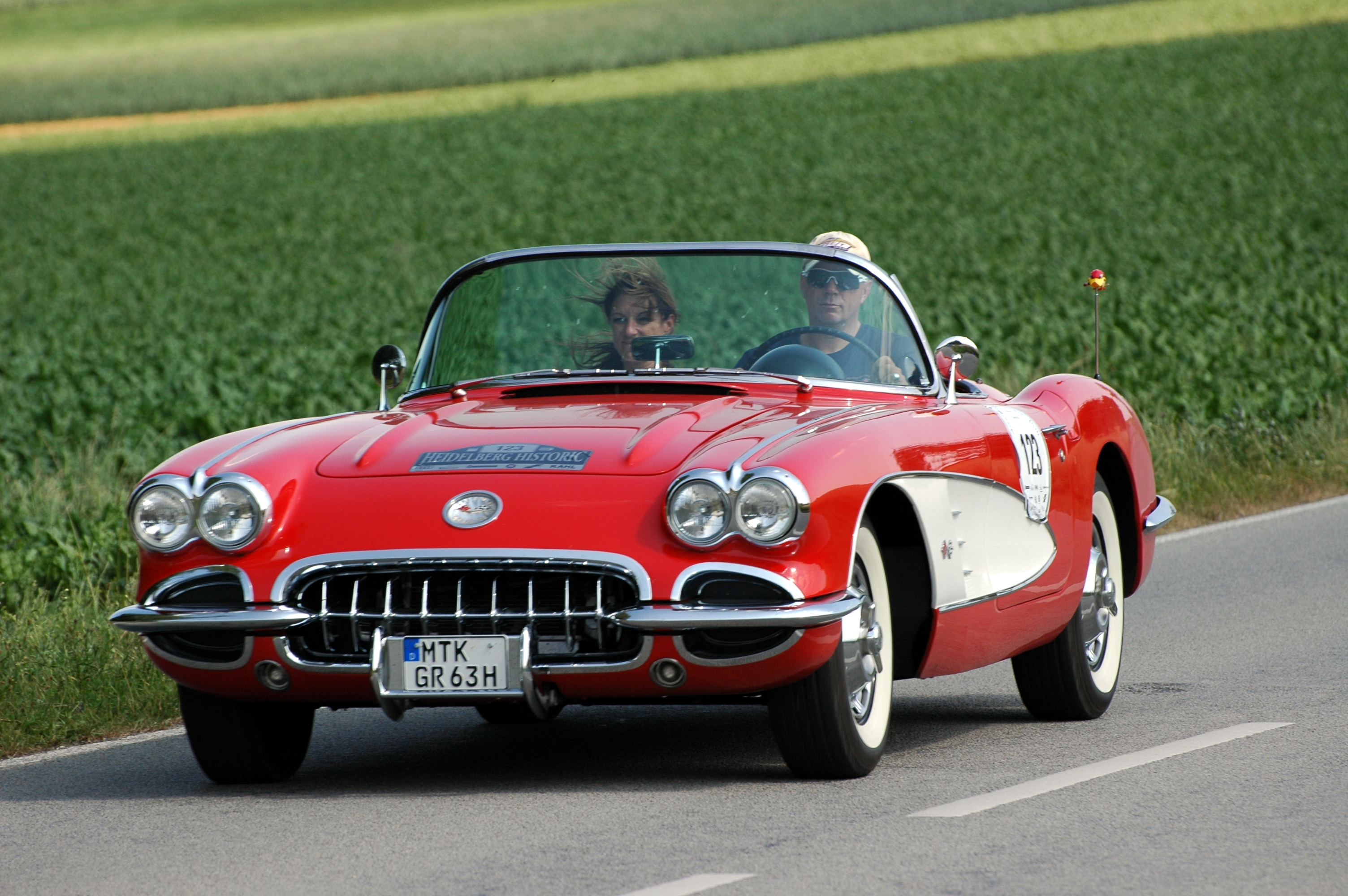
1960 Corvette convertible

=== Second generation (C2; 1963–1967) ===
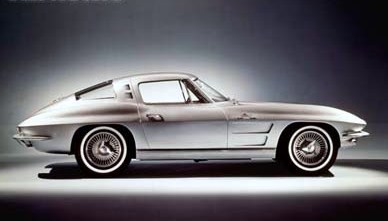
1963 Corvette Sting Ray coupe

The second generation (C2) Corvette, which introduced Sting Ray to the model, continued with fiberglass body panels, and overall, was smaller than the first generation. The car was designed by Larry Shinoda with major inspiration from a previous concept design called the "Q Corvette," which was created by Peter Brock and Chuck Pohlmann under the styling direction of Bill Mitchell. Earlier, Mitchell had sponsored a car known as the "Mitchell Sting Ray" in 1959 because Chevrolet no longer participated in factory racing. This vehicle had the largest effect on the styling of this generation, although it had no top and did not give away what the final version of the C2 would look like. The third inspiration was a mako shark Mitchell had caught while deep-sea fishing.

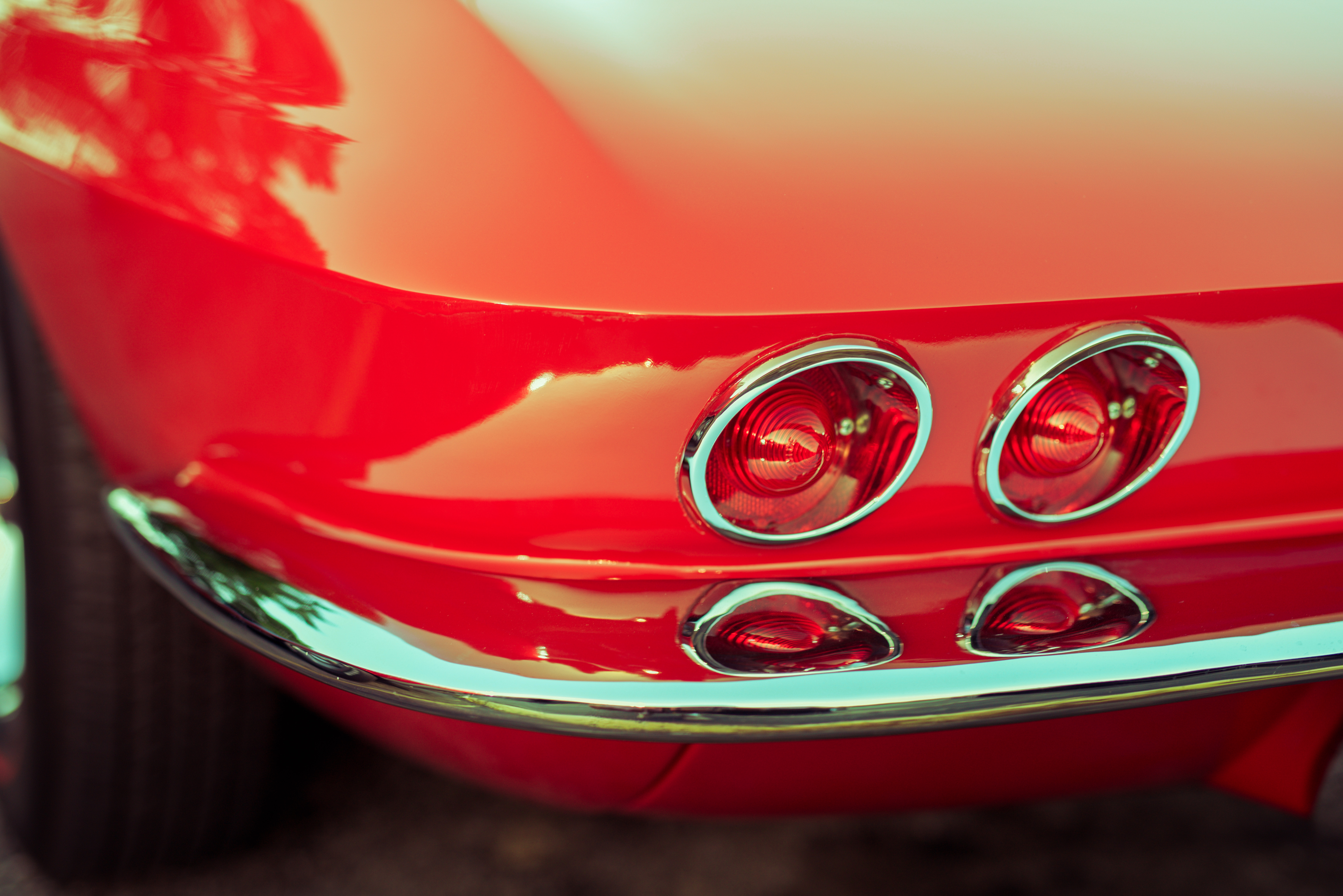
Corvette Sting Ray tail lights

Production started for the 1963 model year and ended in 1967. Introducing a new name, "Sting Ray", the 1963 model was the first year for a Corvette coupé and it featured a distinctive tapering rear deck (a feature that later reappeared on the 1971 "Boattail" Buick Riviera) with, for 1963 only, a split rear window. The Sting Ray featured hidden headlamps, non-functional hood vents, and an independent rear suspension. Corvette chief engineer Zora Arkus-Duntov never liked the split rear window because it blocked rear vision, but Mitchell thought it to be a key part of the entire design. Maximum power for 1963 was 360 hp (268 kW; 365 PS) and was raised to 375 hp (280 kW; 380 PS) in 1964. Options included electronic ignition, the breakerless magnetic pulse-triggered Delcotronic first offered on some 1963 Pontiac models. On 1964 models the decorative hood vents were eliminated and Duntov, the Corvette's chief engineer, got his way with the split rear window changed to a full-width window.

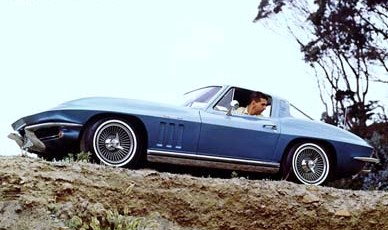
1965 Corvette Sting Ray coupe

Four-wheel disc brakes were introduced in 1965, as was a "big block" engine option: the 396 cu in (6.49 L) V8. Side exhaust pipes were also optionally available in 1965, and continued to be offered through 1967. The introduction of the 425 hp (317 kW; 431 PS) 396 cu in (6.49 L) big block in 1965 spelled the beginning of the end for the Rochester fuel injection system. The 396 cu in (6.49 L) option cost US$292.70 while the fuel injected 327 cu in (5.36 L) engine cost US$538.00. Few could justify spending US$245.00 more for 50 hp (37 kW; 51 PS) less, even though FI could deliver over 20 mpg on the highway and would keep delivering fuel despite high G-loading in corners taken at racing speeds. Another 1963 and 1964 option was the Z06 competition package, which offered stiffer suspension, bigger, multi-segment lined brakes with finned drums, and more. Only a couple hundred coupes and a single convertible were factory-equipped this way in 1963. With only 771 fuel-injected cars built in 1965, Chevrolet discontinued the option at the end of the 1965 production, having introduced a less-expensive big block 396 engine rated at 425 hp in the middle of the production year and selling over 2,000 in just a few months. For 1966, Chevrolet introduced an even larger 427 cu in (7.00 L) Big Block version. Other options available on the C2 included the Wonderbar auto-tuning AM radio, AM-FM radio (mid-1963), air conditioning (late-1963), a telescopic steering wheel (1965), and headrests (1966). The Sting Ray's independent rear suspension was successfully adapted for the new-for-1965 Chevrolet Corvair, which solved the quirky handling problems of that unique rear-engine compact.

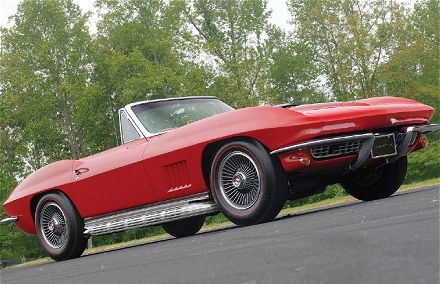
1967 Corvette Sting Ray convertible

1967 was the final model year for the second generation. The 1967 model featured restyled fender vents, less ornamentation, and backup lamps - which were inboard in 1966 - became rectangular and centrally located. The first use of all four taillights in red started in 1961 and was continued thru the C2 line-up except for 1966. This feature returned for the 1967 model year and then continued until 1968, the first C3 model year. The 1967 model year had the first L88 engine option that was rated at 430 hp (321 kW; 436 PS), but unofficial estimates place the output at 560 hp (418 kW; 568 PS) or more. Only twenty such engines were installed at the factory. From 1967 through 1969, the Holley triple two-barrel carburetor, or Tri-Power, was available on the 427 L89 (a $368 option, on top of the cost for the high-performance 427). Despite these changes, sales slipped more than 15%, to 22,940 (8,504 coupes, off close to 15%, and 14,436 convertibles, down nearly 19%).

Duntov came up with a lightweight version of the C2 in 1962. Concerned about Ford and what they were doing with the Shelby Cobra, GM planned to manufacture 100 to 125 Grand Sport Corvettes, but only five were actually built. They were driven by historic drivers such as Roger Penske, A. J. Foyt, Jim Hall, and Dick Guldstrand among others. Those five cars (001–005) are all held by private owners, and are among the most coveted and valuable Corvettes ever built. 002 is exhibited in the Simeone Foundation Automotive Museum and is in running condition.

=== Third generation (C3; 1968–1982) ===
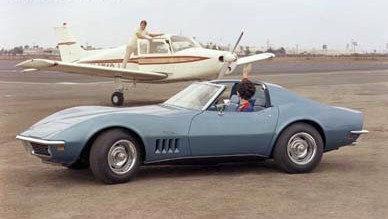
1969 Corvette Stingray coupe with T-top panels removed

The third-generation Corvette, patterned after the Mako Shark II concept car, was introduced for the 1968 model year and was in production until 1982. C3 coupes featured the first use of T-top removable roof panels. It introduced monikers that were later revived, such as LT-1, ZR-1, Z07, and Collector Edition. In 1978, Corvette's 25th anniversary was celebrated with a two-tone Silver Anniversary Edition and an Indy Pace Car replica edition of the C3. This was also the first time that a Corvette was used as a Pace Car for the Indianapolis 500.

Engines and chassis components were mostly carried over from the C2, but the body and interior were new. The 350 cu in (5.7 L) engine replaced the old 327 cu in (5.36 L) as the base engine in 1969, but power remained at 300 hp (224 kW; 304 PS). 1969 was the only year for a C3 to optionally offer either a factory-installed side exhaust or a normal rear exit with chrome tips. The all-aluminum big-block 427 cu in (7.00 L) ZL-1 engine was also new for 1969; the special racing engine was listed at 430 hp (321 kW; 436 PS), but was reported to produce 560 hp (418 kW; 568 PS) and accelerated a ZL-1 through the 1/4 mile (0.40 km) in 10.89 seconds.

There was an extended production run for the 1969 model year due to a lengthy labor strike, which meant sales were down on the 1970 models, to 17,316. 1970 small-block power peaked with the optional high compression, high-revving small-block LT-1 that produced 370 hp (276 kW; 375 PS). The 427 big-block was enlarged to 454 cu in (7.44 L) with a 390 hp (291 kW; 395 PS) rating. The ZR-1 special package was an option available on the 1970 through 1972 model years, and included the LT-1 engine combined with special racing equipment. Only 53 ZR-1's were built.

In 1971, to accommodate regular low-lead fuel with lower anti-knock properties, the engine compression ratios were lowered which resulted in reduced power ratings. The power rating for the 350 cu in (5.7 L) L48 base engine decreased from 300 to 270 horsepower and the optional special high-performance LT1 engine decreased from 370 to 330 horsepower. The LS5 454 cu in (7.4 L) motor was carried over and produced 365 hp (272 kW; 370 PS). Offered in ‘71 only was the LS6 454 cu in (7.4 L) big-block featuring aluminum heads and delivering 425 hp (317 kW; 431 PS), the highest of the 1970-1972 series, and could be ordered with an automatic transmission. For the 1972 model year, GM moved to the SAE Net measurement which resulted in further reduced, but more realistic, power ratings than the previous SAE Gross standard. Although the 1972 model's 350 cu in (5.7 L) horsepower was actually the same as that for the 1971 model year, the lower net horsepower numbers were used instead of gross horsepower. The L48 base engine rating fell to 200 hp (149 kW; 203 PS) SAE and the optional LT1 dropped to 270 hp (201 kW; 274 PS) SAE. 1974 models had the last true dual exhaust system that was dropped on the 1975 models with the introduction of catalytic converters requiring the use of no-lead fuel. Engine power decreased with the base ZQ3 engine producing 165 hp (123 kW; 167 PS), the optional L82's output 205 hp (153 kW; 208 PS), while the 454 big-block engine was discontinued. Gradual power increases after 1975 peaked in 1980 with the model's optional L82 producing 230 hp (172 kW; 233 PS) in its final year. 1981 saw a single engine, the L81, which had 190 hp (142 kW; 193 PS) while the fuel-injected 1982 L83 had 200 hp (149 kW; 203 PS).

Styling changed subtly throughout the generation until 1978 for the car's 25th anniversary. The Sting Ray nameplate was not used on the 1968 model, but Chevrolet still referred to the Corvette as a Sting Ray; however, 1969 (through 1976) models used the "Stingray" name as one word, without the space. In 1970, the body design was updated including fender flares, and interiors were refined, including redesigned seats and indication lights near the gear shift that were an early use of fiber optics. To comply with government safety regulations the 1973 Corvette's chrome front bumper was changed to a 5-mile-per-hour (8 km/h) system with a urethane bumper cover, while the rear retained the two-piece chrome bumper set, its last year. The optional wire-spoked wheel covers (left) were offered for the last time in 1973. Only 45 Z07 were built in 1973. From 1974 onwards both the front and rear bumpers were polyurethane.

In 1974, a 5-mile-per-hour (8 km/h) rear bumper system with a two-piece, tapering urethane bumper cover replaced the Kamm-tail and chrome bumper blades, and matched the new front design from the previous year. The 1975 model year ended the convertible body style until it returned 11 years later, and Dave McLellan succeeded Zora Arkus-Duntov as the Corvette's Chief Engineer. For the 1976 models the fiberglass floor was replaced with steel panels to provide protection from the catalytic converter's high operating temperature. For 15 model years the names Corvette, Sting Ray, and Stingray were synonymous. 1977 was the last year the tunneled roof treatment with a vertical back window was used, in addition, leather seats were available at no additional cost for the first time. The black exterior color returned after a six-year absence.

The 1978 25th Anniversary model introduced the fastback glass rear window and featured a new interior and dashboard. Corvette's 25th anniversary was celebrated with the Indy 500 Pace Car limited edition and a Silver Anniversary model featuring silver over gray lower body paint. All 1979 models featured the previous year's pace car seats and offered the front and rear spoilers as optional equipment. 53,807 were produced for the model year, making 1979 the peak production year for all versions of the Corvette. Sales have trended downward since then. In 1980, the Corvette received an integrated aerodynamic redesign that resulted in a significant reduction in drag. After several years of weight increases, 1980 Corvettes were lighter as engineers trimmed both body and chassis weight. In mid-1981, production relocated from St. Louis, to Bowling Green, Kentucky (where all subsequent Corvette generations have since been manufactured), and several two-tone paint options were offered. The 1981 models were the last available with a manual transmission until well into the 1984 production run. In 1982, a fuel-injected engine returned, and a final C3 tribute Collectors Edition featured an exclusive, opening rear window hatch.

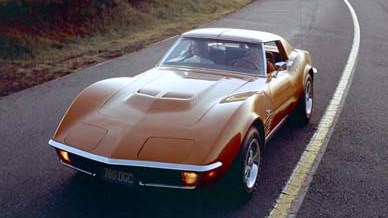
1971 Corvette Stingray coupe

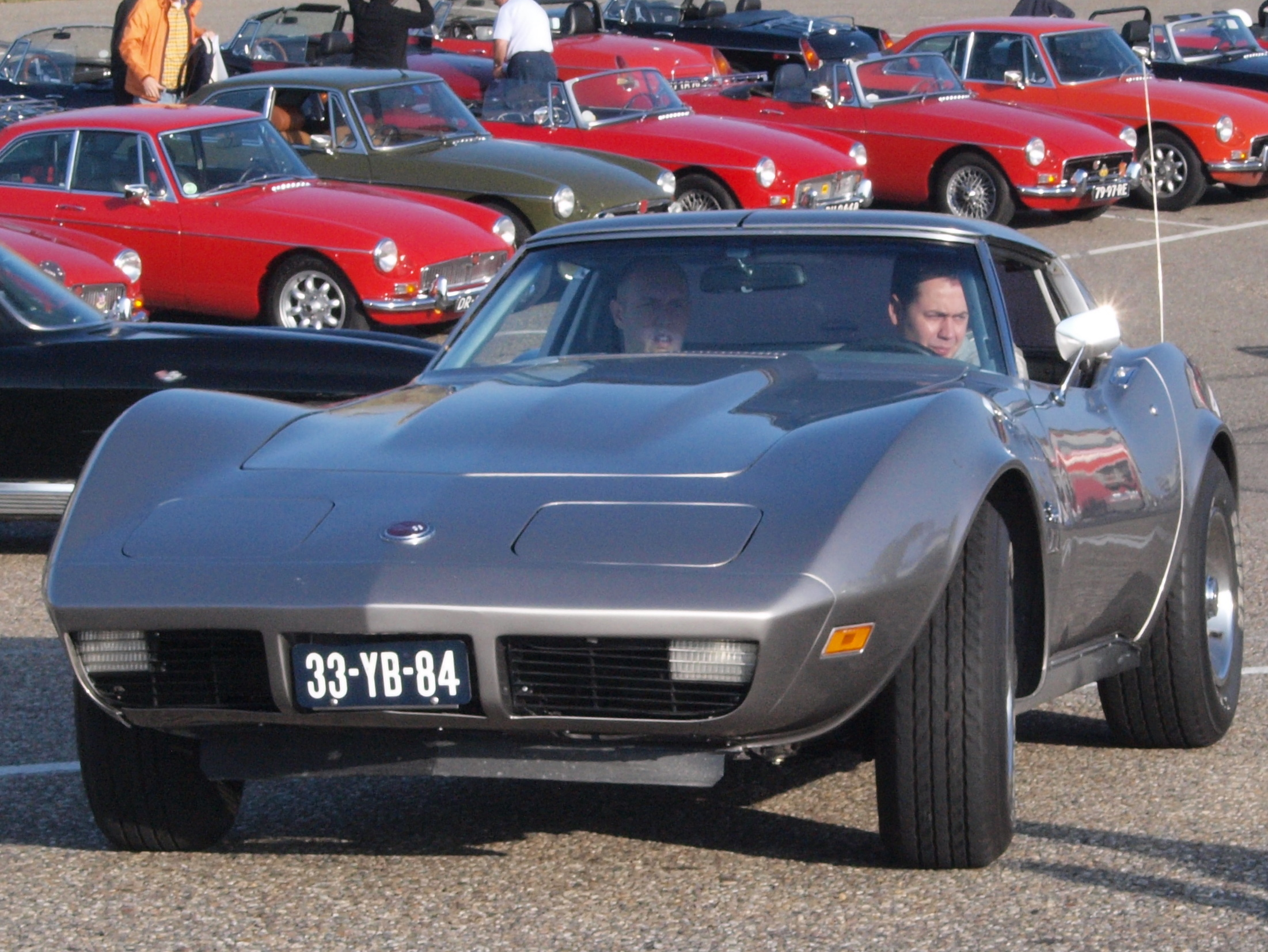
1974 Corvette Stingray coupe

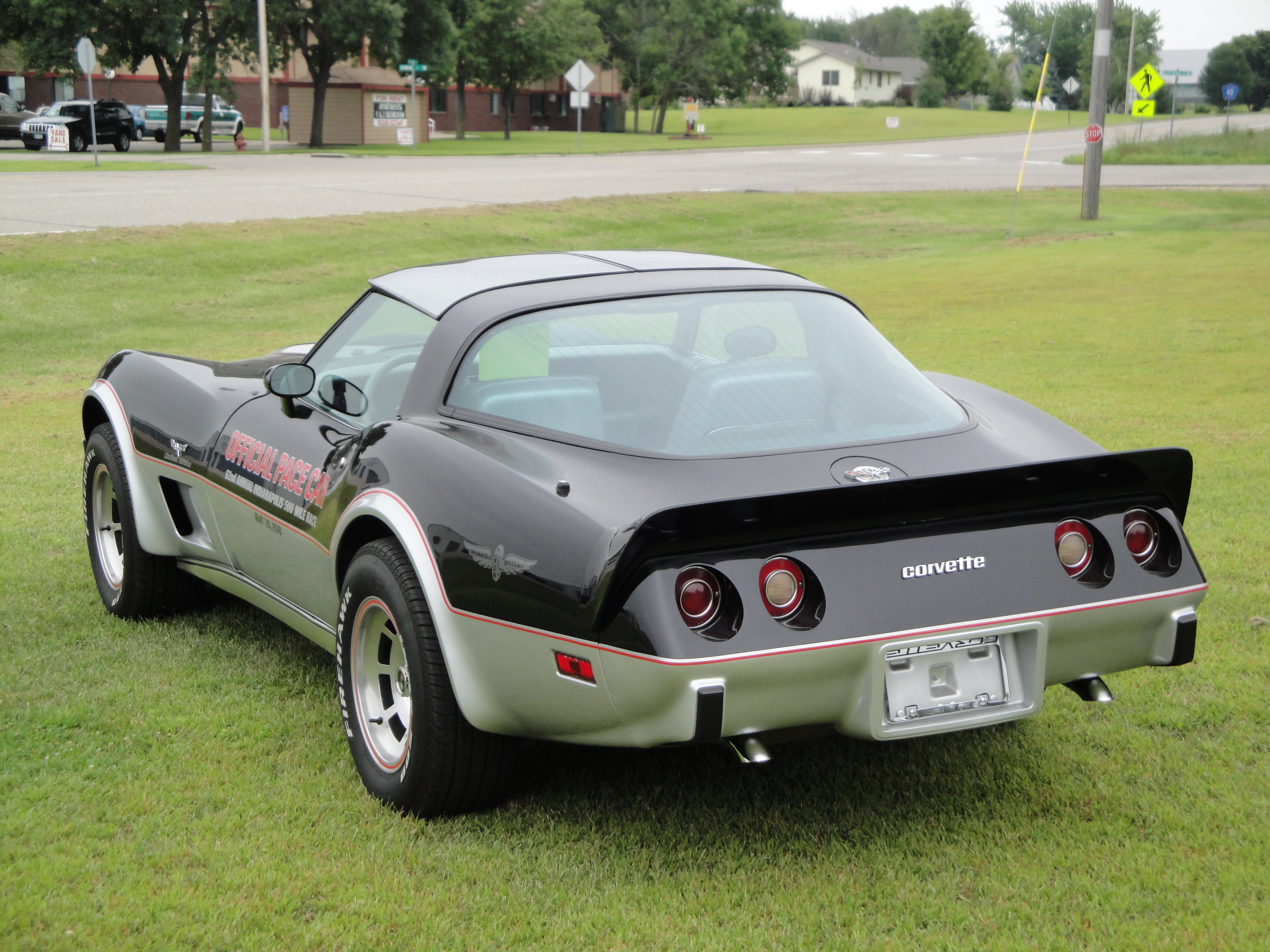
1978 Corvette Indy 500 Pace Car Edition (rear)

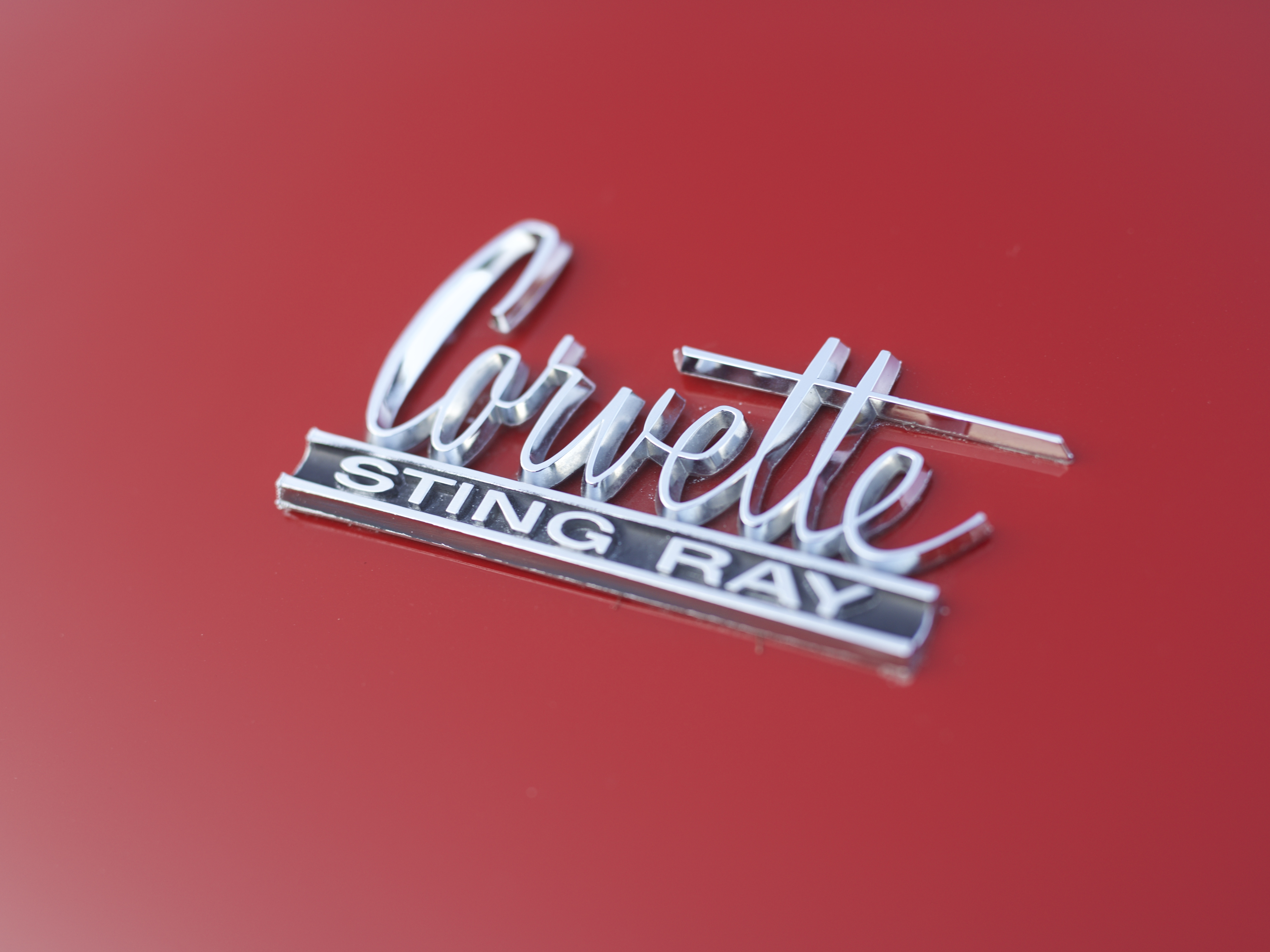
Corvette Sting Ray detail

=== Fourth generation (C4; 1983–1996) ===
The fourth-generation Corvette was the first complete redesign of the Corvette since 1963. Production was to begin for the 1983 model year, but quality issues and part delays resulted in only 43 prototypes for the 1983 model year produced that were never sold. All of the 1983 prototypes were destroyed or serialized as 1984 model year except one white example with a medium blue interior. After extensive testing and modifications were completed, it was initially retired as a display sitting in an external wall over the Bowling Green Assembly Plant's employee entrance. Later this only surviving 1983 prototype was removed, restored, and put on display at the National Corvette Museum in Bowling Green, Kentucky. It is still owned by GM. On February 12, 2014, it was nearly lost to a sinkhole which opened up under the museum. Eight other Corvettes were severely damaged.

Regular fourth generation production began on January 3, 1983; the 1984 model year and delivery to customers began in March 1983. The 1984 model carried over the 350 cu in (5.7 L) L83 "Crossfire" V8 engine from the final 1982 third-generation model. New chassis features were aluminum brake calipers and an all-aluminum suspension for weight savings and rigidity. The new one-piece Targa top had no center reinforcement. Retractable headlights continued to be used, but became single units, which had been last used in 1957. A new electronic dashboard with digital liquid crystal displays for the speedometer and tachometer was standard. Beginning in 1985, the 230 hp (172 kW; 233 PS) L98 engine with tuned port fuel injection became the standard engine.

September 1984 through 1988 Corvettes were available with a "4+3" transmission designed by Doug Nash - a four-speed manual coupled to an automatic overdrive on the top three gears. It was devised to help the Corvette meet U.S. fuel economy standards. Since 1981 (when it was last offered), a manual transmission returned to the Corvette starting with production in late 1984. The transmission proved to be problematic and was replaced by a modern ZF six-speed manual transmission in 1989.

In 1986, the second Corvette Indy Pace Car was released. It was the first convertible Corvette since 1975. A Center High Mounted Signal Light (CHMSL) – a third center brake light – was added in 1986 to comply with safety regulations. While the color of the pace car used in the race was yellow, all 1986 convertibles also had an Indy 500 emblem mounted on the console, making any color a "pace car edition". In 1987, the B2K twin-turbo option became available from the factory. The Callaway Corvette was a Regular Production Option (RPO B2K). The B2K option coexisted in 1990 and 1991 with the ZR-1 option, which then replaced it. Early B2Ks produced 345 hp (257 kW; 350 PS) and 450 lb⋅ft (610 N⋅m); later versions boasted 450 hp (336 kW; 456 PS) and 613 lb⋅ft (831 N⋅m).

1988 saw the 35th Anniversary Edition of the Corvette. In 1990, the ZR1 option Corvette was introduced with the LT5 engine designed by Lotus and built in the Mercury Marine plant in Stillwater, Oklahoma. The LT5 engine was a four-cam (DOHC) design producing 375 hp (280 kW). The C4 ZR1 ran from 1990 thru 1995 model years. In 1991, all Corvettes received updates to the body, interior, and wheels. The convex rear fascia that set the 1990 ZR-1 apart from the base model was included on L98 Corvettes, making the styling of the expensive ZR-1 nearly identical to that of the base cars. The most obvious difference remaining between the base and ZR-1 models besides the wider rear wheels was the location of the CHMSL, which was integrated into the new rear fascia used on the base model, but remained at the top of the rear hatch on the ZR-1's.

For the 1992 model year, the 300 hp (224 kW) LT1 engine was introduced, an increase of 50 hp (37 kW) over 1991's L98 engine. This engine featured reverse-flow cooling (the heads were cooled before the block), which allowed for a higher compression ratio of 10.5:1. Also new for 1992 was Acceleration Slip Regulation (ASR), a form of traction control that utilized the Corvette's brakes, spark retard, and throttle close-down to prevent excessive rear wheel spin and possible loss of control.

Production of the ZR-1 ended in 1995 after 6,939 cars had been built. 1996 was the final year of C4 production, and featured special models and options, including the Grand Sport and Collector Edition, OBD II (On-Board Diagnostics), run-flat tires, and the LT4 engine. The 330 hp (246 kW; 335 PS) LT4 V8 was available only with a manual transmission, while all 300 hp (224 kW; 304 PS) LT1 Corvettes used automatic transmissions. Chevrolet released the Grand Sport (GS) version in 1996 to mark the end of production of the C4 Corvette. The Grand Sport moniker was a nod to the original Grand Sport model produced in 1963. The Grand Sport came only in Admiral Blue with a white stripe down the middle, black wheels, and two red stripes on the front left wheel arch.

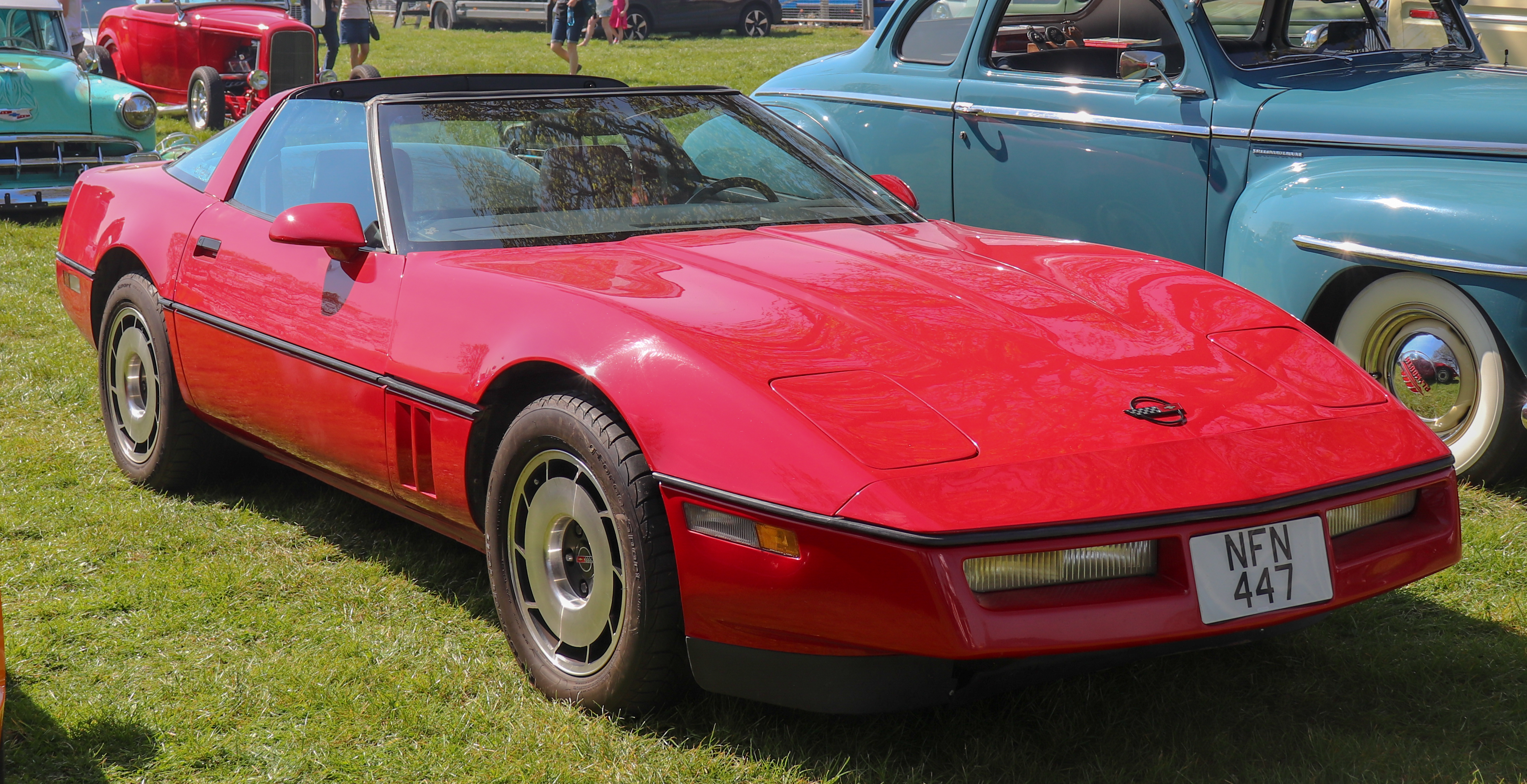
1984 Corvette with targa top open

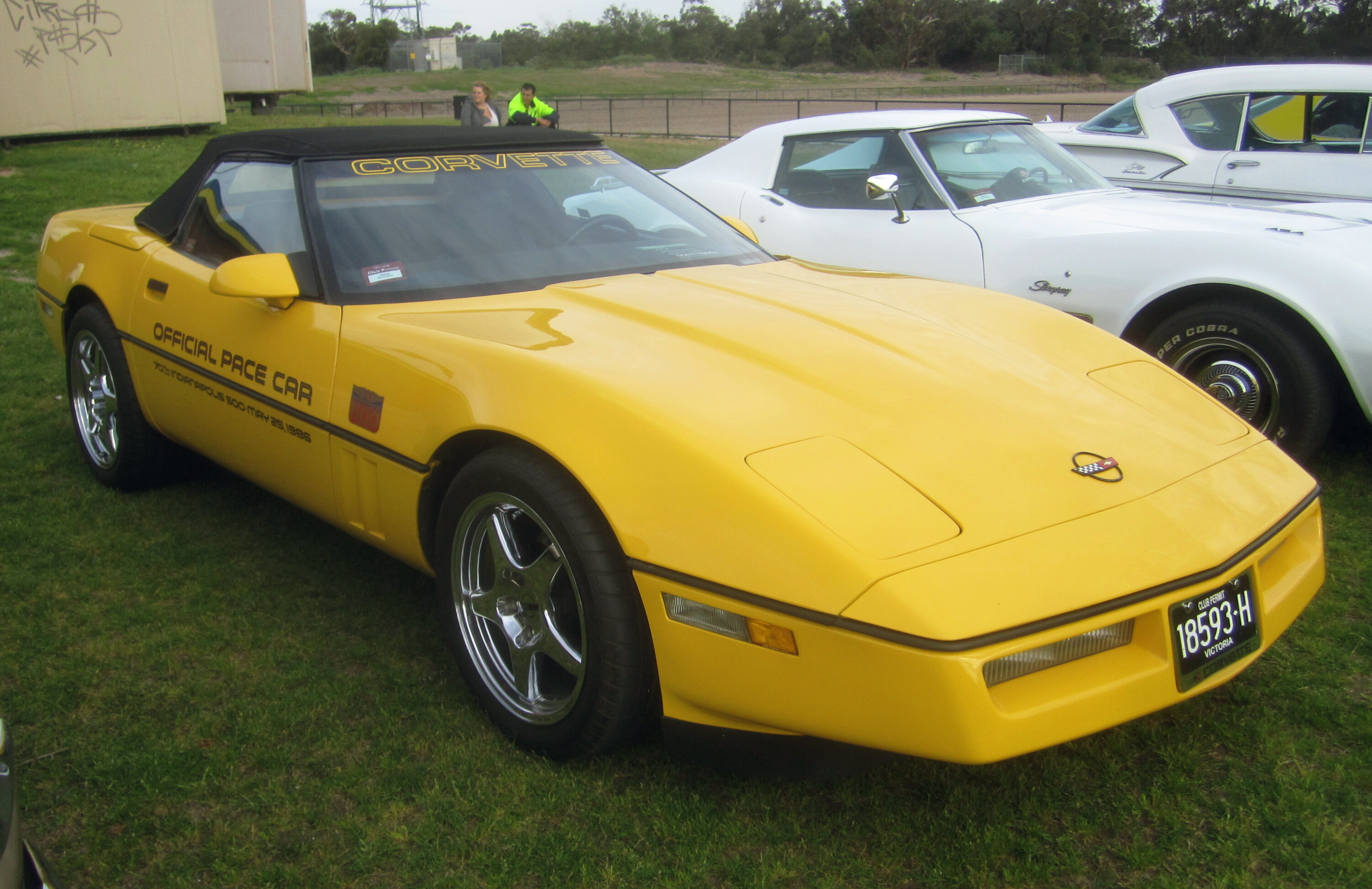
1986 Corvette convertible Indy 500 Pace Car Edition

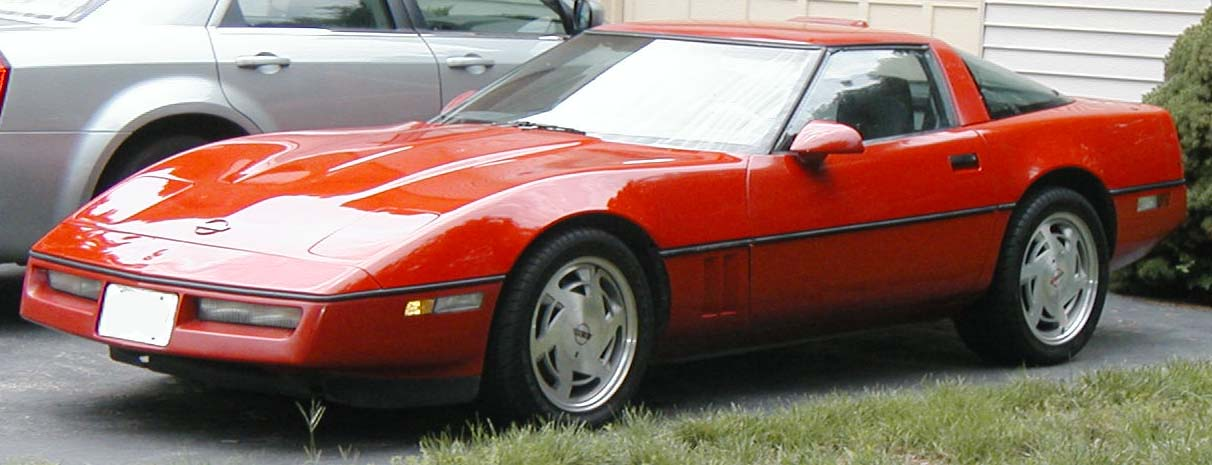
1988 Corvette coupe

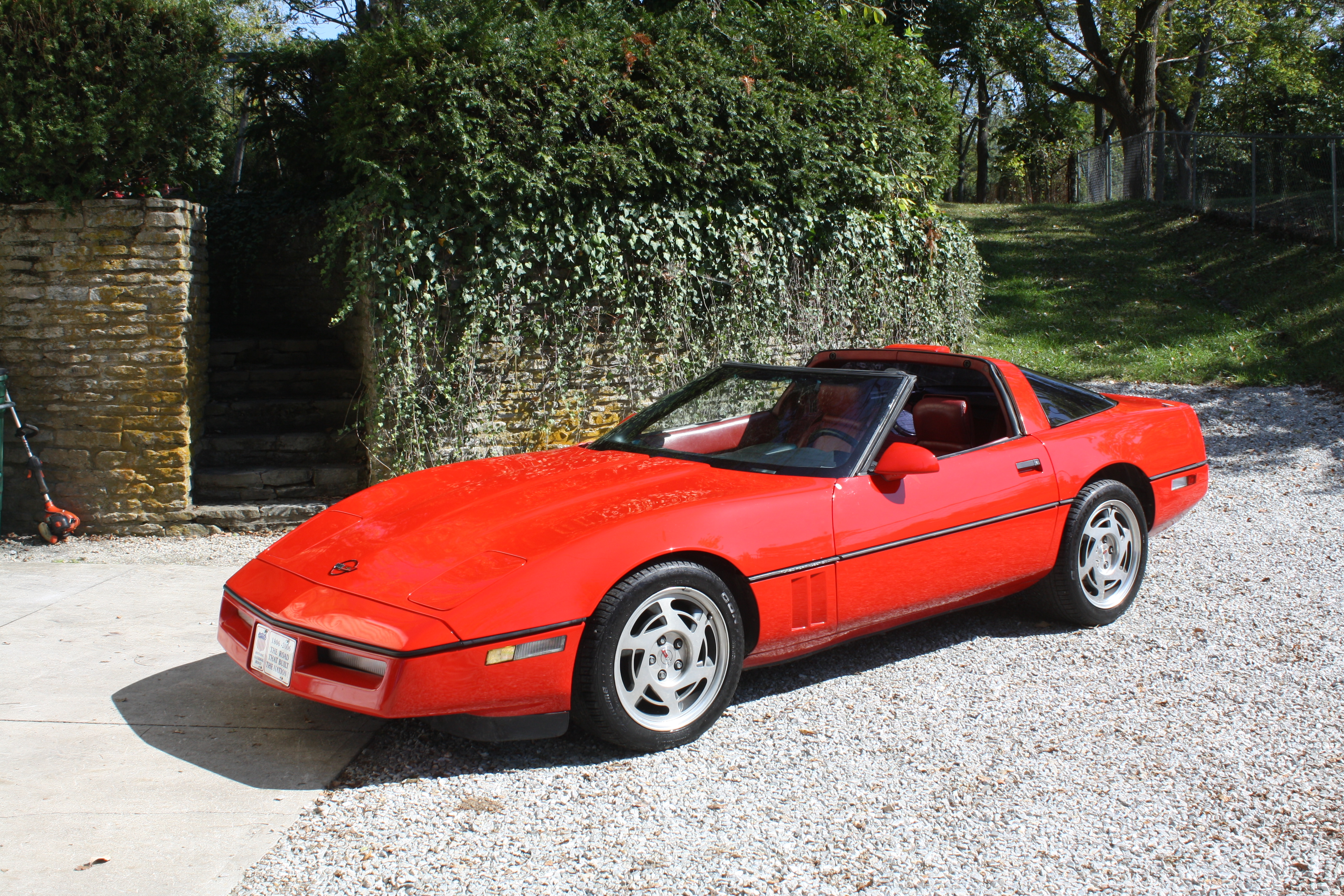
1990 Red C4 Corvette

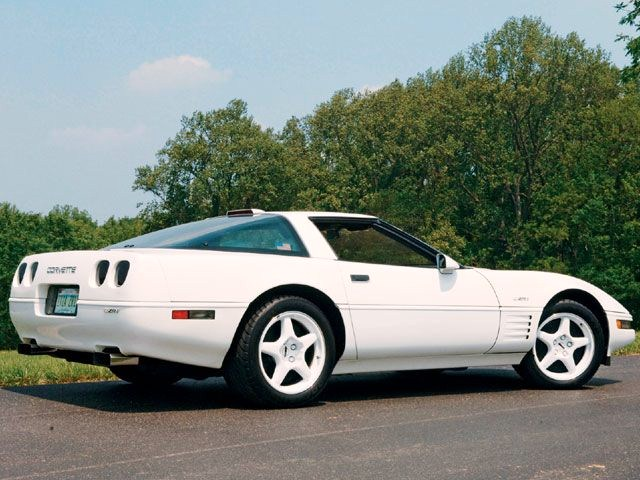
1992 Corvette ZR-1

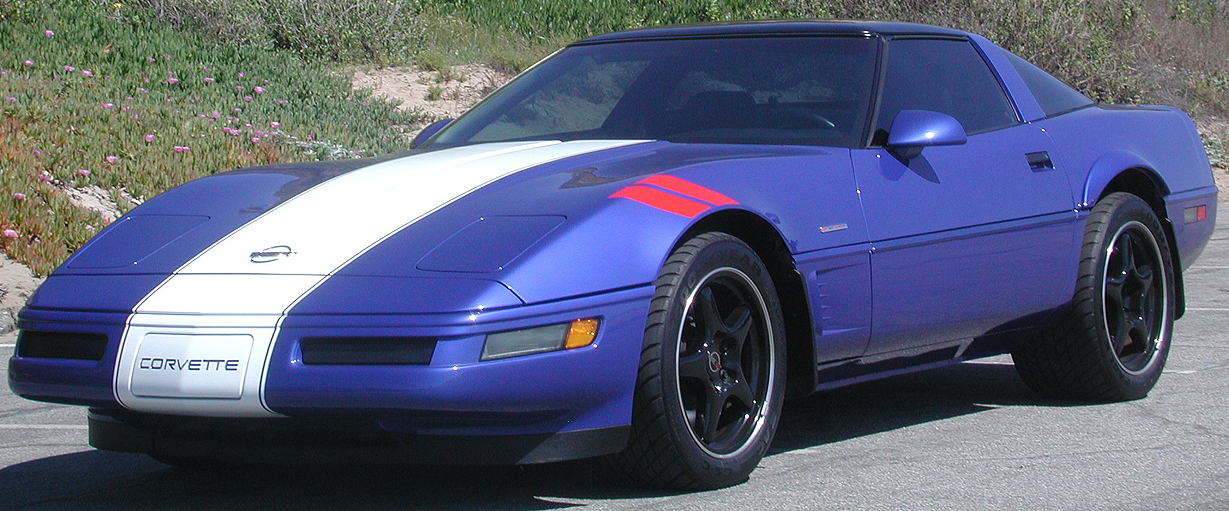
1996 Corvette Grand Sport

=== Fifth generation (C5; 1997–2004) ===
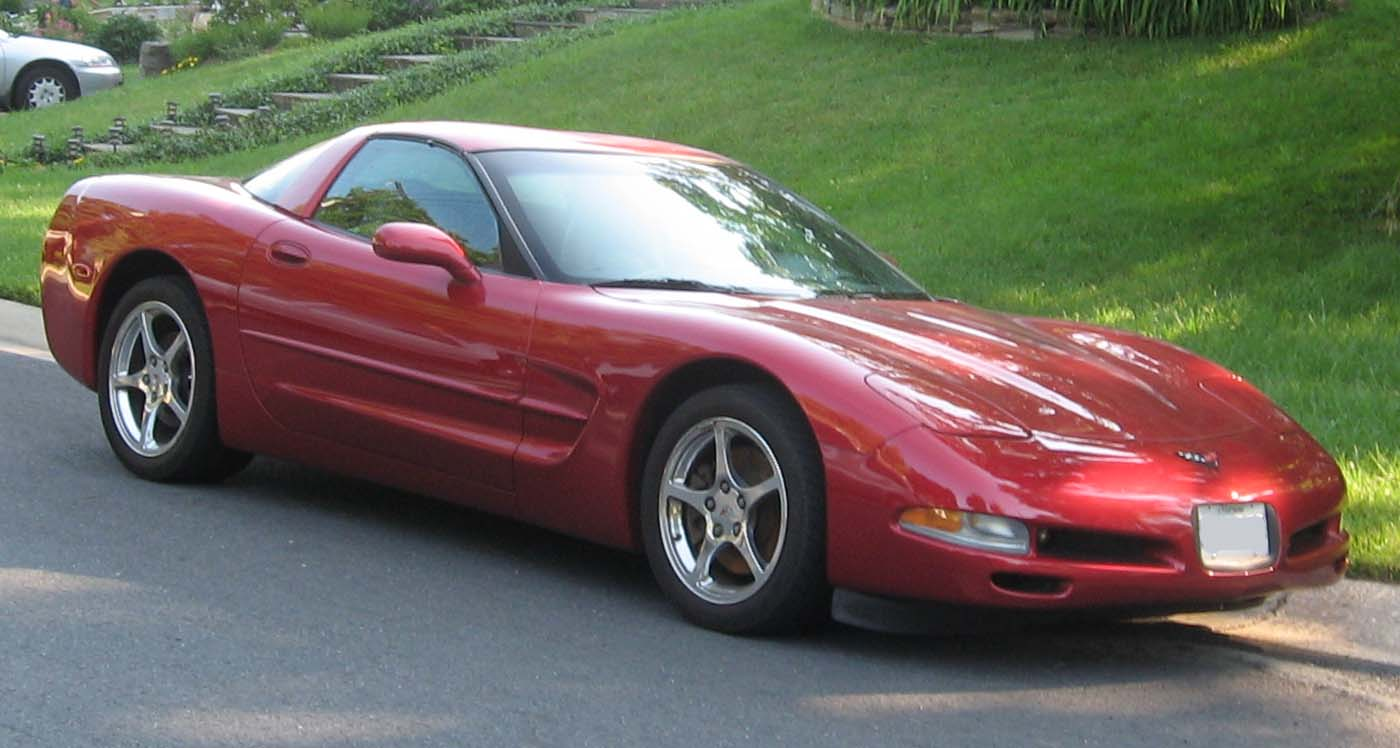
Corvette C5 coupe

The C5 Corvette was redesigned from the ground up after sales from the previous generation began to decline. C5 Corvette was publicly unveiled in January 1997 with dealer deliveries in March. Production continued through the 2004 model year. The C5 was a completely new design featuring new concepts and manufacturing innovations, subsequently carried forward to the C6 & C7. With a top speed of 176 mph (283 km/h), the C5 was noted by the automotive press as an advance, with improved dynamics in nearly every area over the C4. Innovations included a 0.29 drag coefficient, a notably lower weight with near 50/50 weight distribution, and active handling (the first stability control for a Corvette).

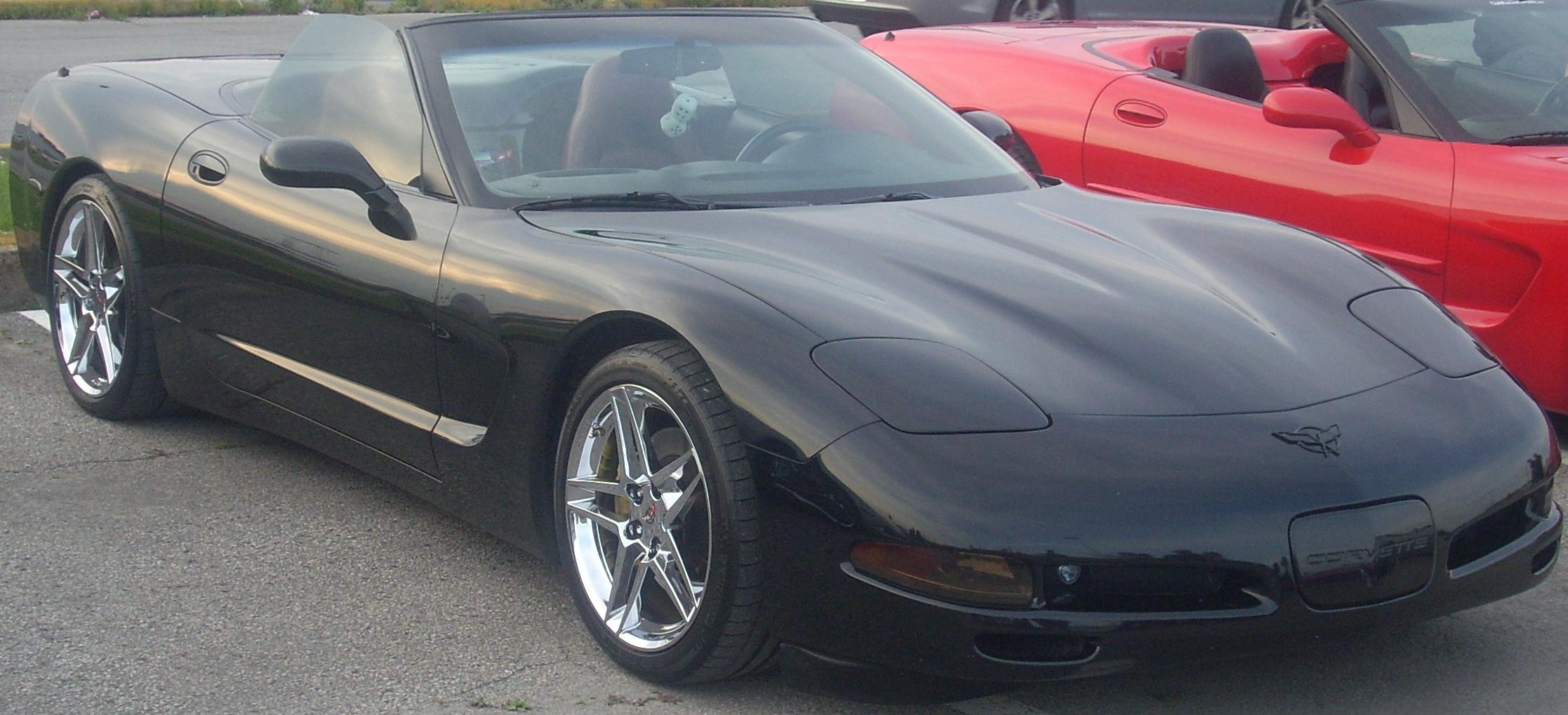
Corvette C5 convertible

An all-new LS1 aluminum engine (Gen III small block) featured individual ignition coils for each cylinder, and aluminum block and pistons. It was initially rated at 345 hp (257 kW; 350 PS) and 350 lb⋅ft (475 N⋅m), but was increased to 350 hp (261 kW; 355 PS) in the 2001 edition. The new engine, combined with the new body, was able to achieve up to 28 mpg on the highway.

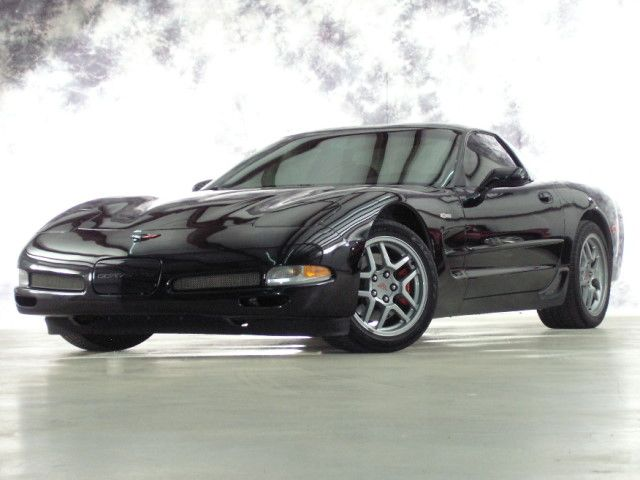
Corvette Z06

For its first year, the C5 was available only as a coupe, though the new platform was designed from the ground up to be a convertible, introduced for model year 1998. A fixed-roof coupe (FRC) followed in 1999. One concept for the FRC was for it to be a stripped-down model with a possible V6 engine (nicknamed in-house as the "Billy Bob"). By 2000, FRC plans laid the groundwork for the return in 2001 of the Z06, an RPO option not seen since Zora's 1963 race-ready Corvette.

The Z06 model replaced the FRC model as the highest-performance C5 Corvette. Instead of a heavier double-overhead cam engine like the ZR-1 of the C4 generation, the Z06 used an LS6, a 385 hp (287 kW; 390 PS) derivative of the standard LS1 engine. Using the much more rigid fixed roof design allowed the Z06 improved handling thanks to upgraded brakes and less body flex. Those characteristics, along with the use of materials such as a titanium exhaust system and a carbon fiber hood in the 2004 model year, led to further weight savings and performance gains for the C5 Z06. The LS6 was later upgraded to 405 hp (302 kW; 411 PS) for 2002–2004. Although the Z06's rated power output is equal to that of the C4 ZR-1, the improved rigidity, suspension, brakes, and reduced weight of the C5 produced a car quicker than C4 ZR-1.

=== Sixth generation (C6; 2005–2013) ===
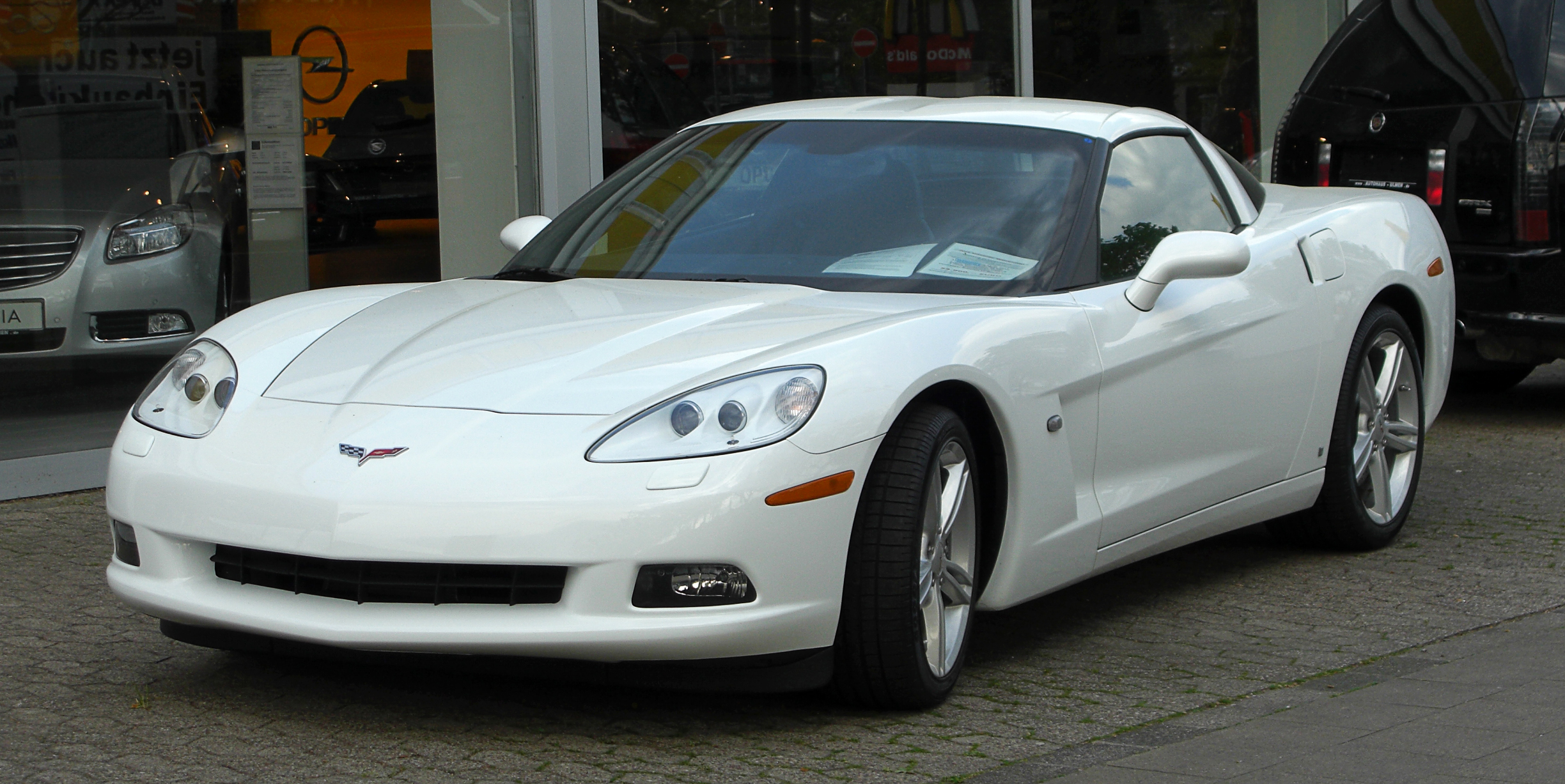
Corvette C6 coupe

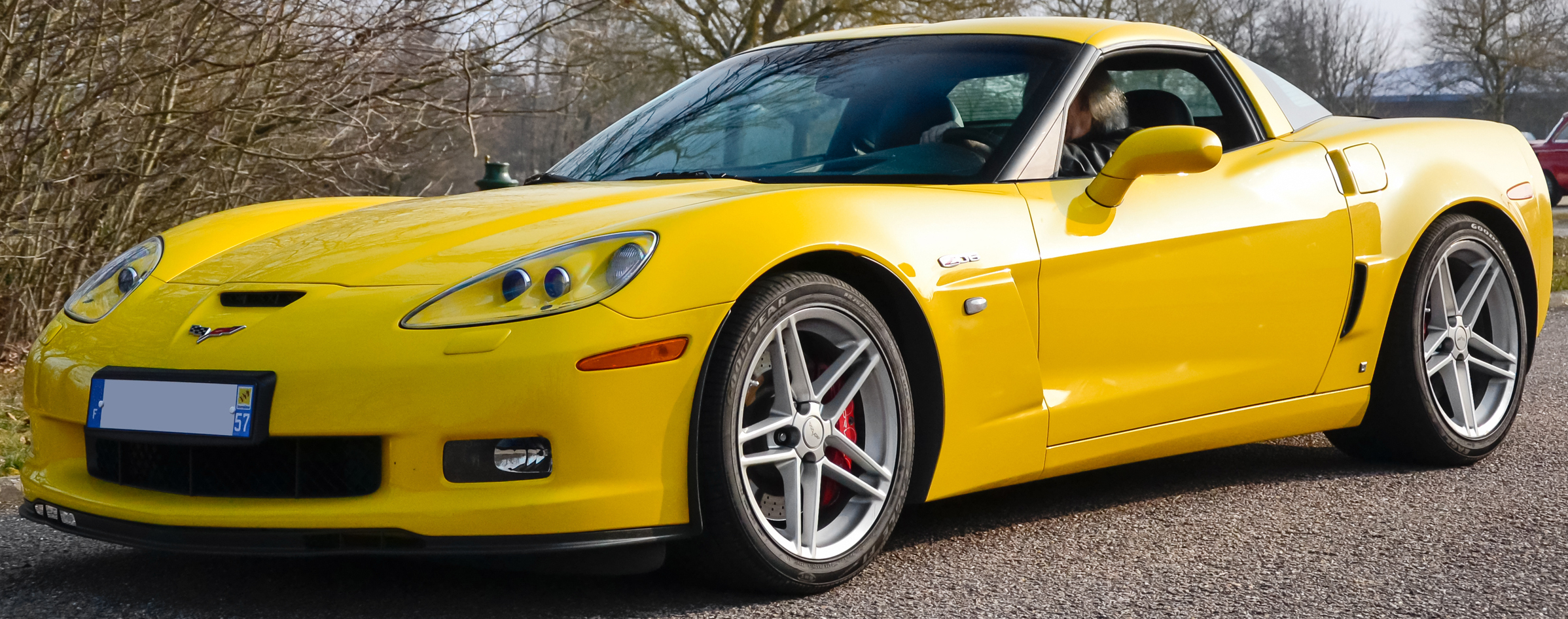
C6 Corvette Z06

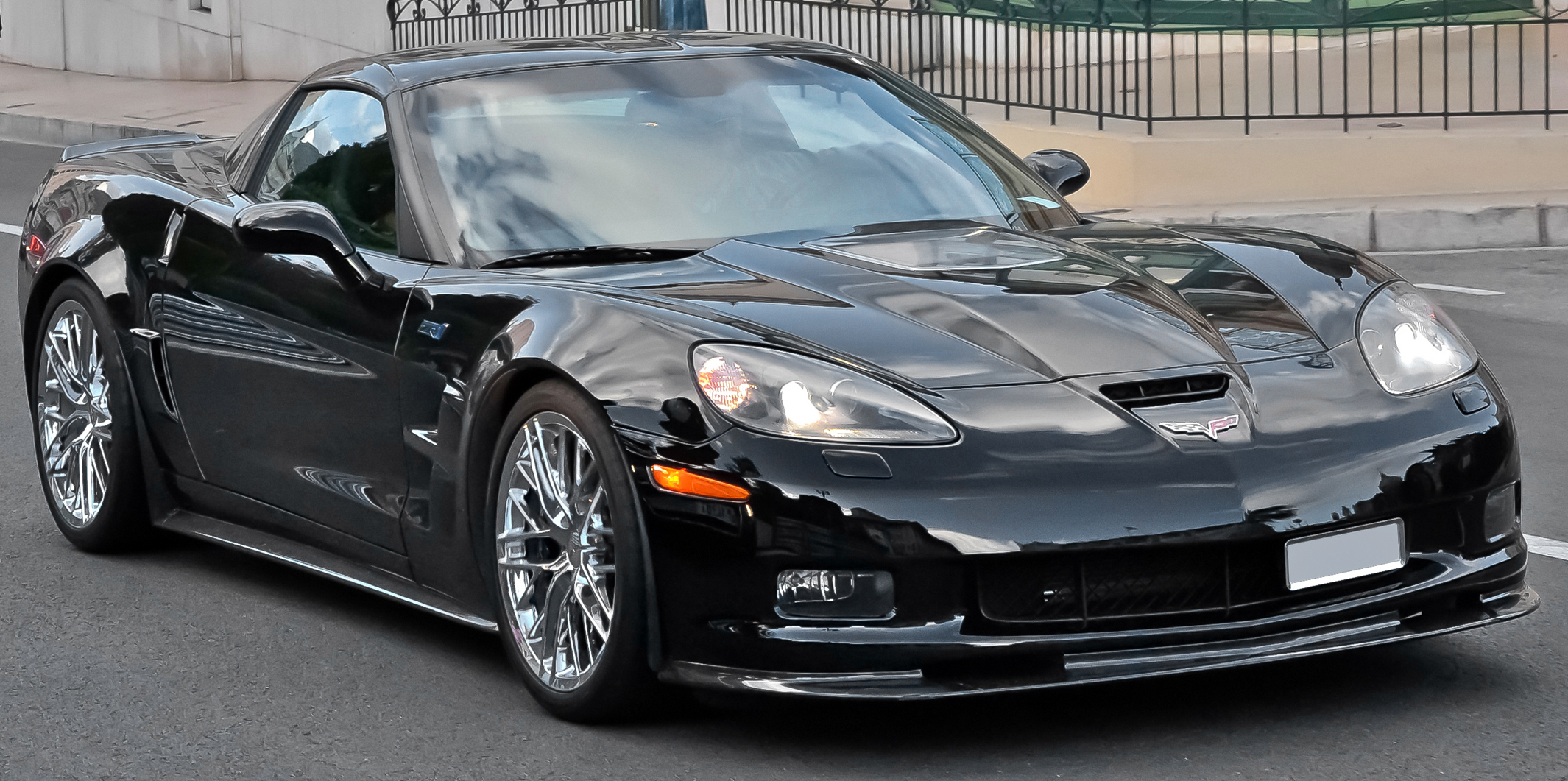
C6 Corvette ZR1

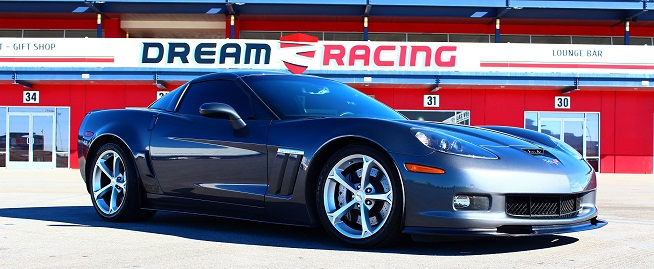
2010 Corvette Grand Sport

For the C6 Corvette GM wanted to focus more on refining the C5 than trying to redesign it. Car & Driver, and Motor Trend, described the C6 as an "evolution of the C5, instead of a complete redo". The C6 wheelbase was increased while body overhangs were decreased when compared to the C5. Retractable headlights were replaced with fixed units, for the first time since 1962. The C6 brought a new and improved interior compared to the C5. As a result of the upgraded interior, the C6 had a slight increase in passenger hip room. It also sported an updated engine called the LS2, which bumped the 5.7 L (350 cu in) LS1/LS6 to 6.0 L (364 cu in) and gained 50 HP, producing 400 hp (298 kW; 406 PS) at 6000 rpm and 400 lb⋅ft (542 N⋅m) at 4400 rpm, and giving the vehicle a 0–60 mph (0–97 km/h) time of under 4.2 seconds. It can reach a top speed of 190 mph (310 km/h). The C6 shared some components with the Cadillac XLR hard-top convertible introduced two years earlier in 2003.

The C6 generation did not match the previous generation's relatively good fuel economy, despite its relatively low 0.28 drag coefficient and low curb weight, achieving 16/26 mpg (city/highway) equipped with automatic or manual transmissions; like all manual transmission Corvettes since 1989, it is fitted with Computer Aided Gear Selection (CAGS) to improve fuel economy by requiring drivers to shift from 1st gear directly to 4th in low-speed/low-throttle conditions. This feature helps the C6 avoid the Gas Guzzler Tax by achieving better fuel economy.

The new Z06 arrived as a 2006 model in the third quarter of 2005. It has a 7.0 L version of the small block engine codenamed LS7. At 427.6 cubic inches, the Z06 was the largest small block ever offered by General Motors. Because of the Corvette's former use of 427 cubic-inch big blocks in the late-1960s and early 1970s, the LS7's size was rounded down to 427 cubic inches. Official output was 505 hp (377 kW; 512 PS) and has a 0–60 mph (0–97 km/h) time of 3.7 seconds. Top speed is 198 mph (319 km/h). Another first for a Corvette, the Z06 featured a full aluminum chassis. The frame mirrored the C5/6 architecture, but substituted aluminum hydroformed rails and aluminum extrusions and castings fore and aft. This dropped weight from 419 to 287 pounds while improving chassis stiffness.

For 2008, the Corvette received a mild freshening: a new LS3 engine with displacement increased to 6.2 L (380 cu in), resulting in 430 hp (321 kW; 436 PS) and 424 lb⋅ft (575 N⋅m) (436 hp (325 kW; 442 PS) and 428 lb⋅ft (580 N⋅m) if ordered with the optional performance exhaust). The six-speed manual transmission also has improved shift linkage, allowing for a 0–60 mph (0–97 km/h) time of 4.0 seconds, while the automatic is set up for quicker shifts giving the C6 automatic a 0–60 mph (0–97 km/h) time of 4.0 seconds, quicker than any other production automatic Corvette up to that point. The interior was slightly updated and a new 4LT leather-wrap interior package was added. The wheels were also updated to a new five-spoke design.

The ZR1 was formally announced in a December 2007 press statement by General Motors, where it was revealed that their target of 100 hp (75 kW; 101 PS) per 1 L (61 cu in) had been reached by a new "LS9" engine with an Eaton-supercharged 6.2-liter engine producing 638 hp (476 kW; 647 PS) and 604 lb⋅ft (819 N⋅m) of torque. The LS9 engine was the most powerful to be put into a GM production sports car. Its top speed was 205 mph (330 km/h).

The historical name Grand Sport returned to the Corvette lineup in 2010 as an entirely new model series that replaced the Z51 option. The new model was an LS3 equipped Z06 with a steel frame instead of aluminum. It retained many of the features of the Z06 including a wide body with 18x9.5 and 19x12 inch wheels, dry-sump oiling (manual transmission coupes only), 6-piston 14-inch front brakes and 4-piston rear, and improved suspension. Manual transmission-equipped G/S coupe models received a tweaked LS3 with a forged crank, are built in Z06 fashion by hand, and utilize a dry-sump oil system. The first three gears were also made shorter for better throttle response and faster acceleration. A new launch control system was introduced for all models that allow for sub-4-second 0–60. EPA is estimated at 26 MPG highway, 1.0 G on skid pad.

Beginning with the 2011 model year, buyers of the Corvette Z06 and ZR1 were offered the opportunity to assist in the build of their engines. Titled the "Corvette Engine Build Experience," buyers paid extra to be flown to the Wixom, Michigan Performance Build Center. Participants helped the assembly line workers build the V8 engine, then took delivery of the car at the National Corvette Museum in Bowling Green, KY, near the Corvette final assembly point.

The last C6 Corvette was manufactured in February 2013. In May 2013, a federal investigation of problems with more than 100,000 C6 lighting systems was announced.

=== Seventh generation (C7; 2014–2019) ===
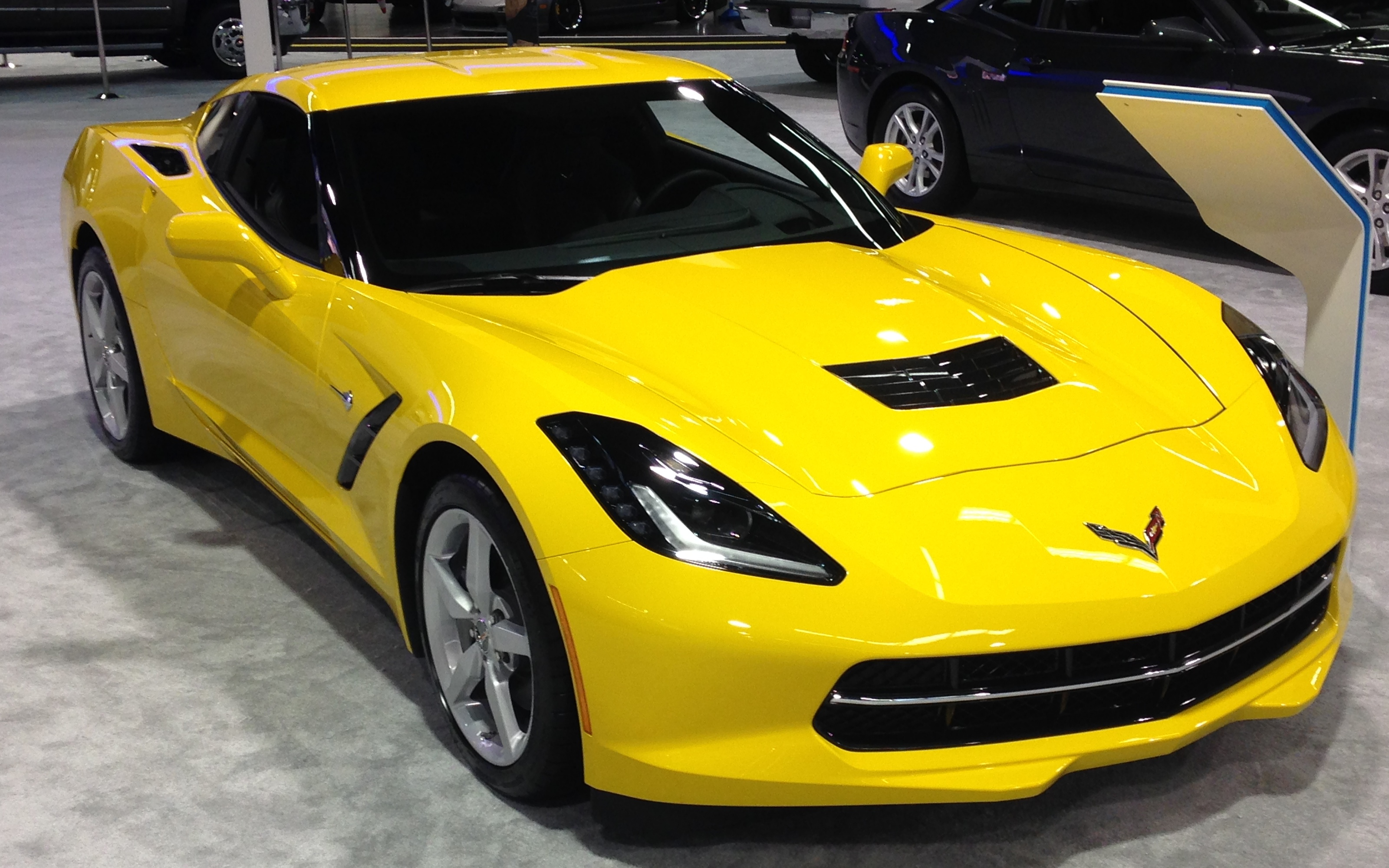
2014 Corvette Stingray coupe

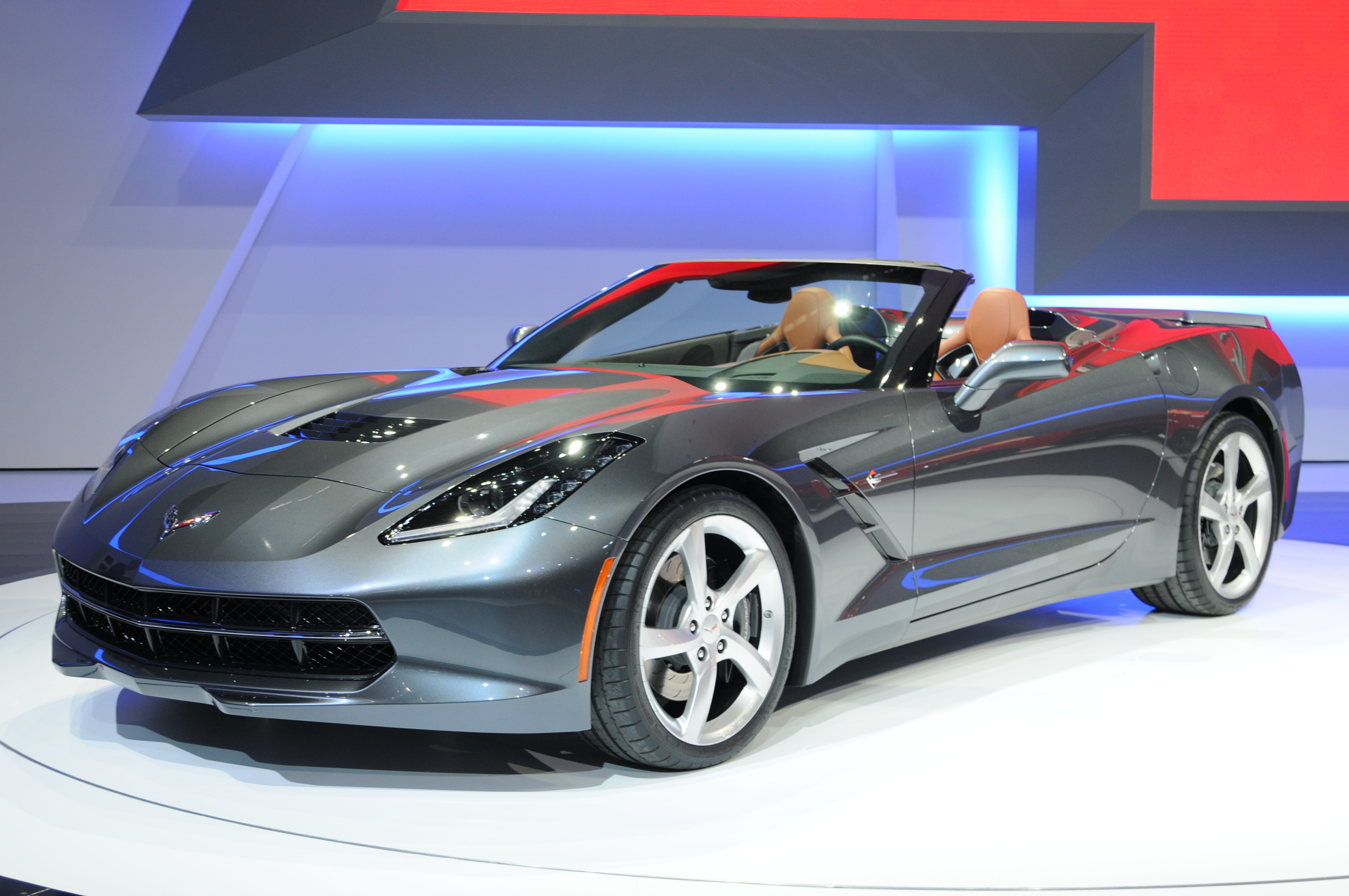
2014 Corvette Stingray convertible

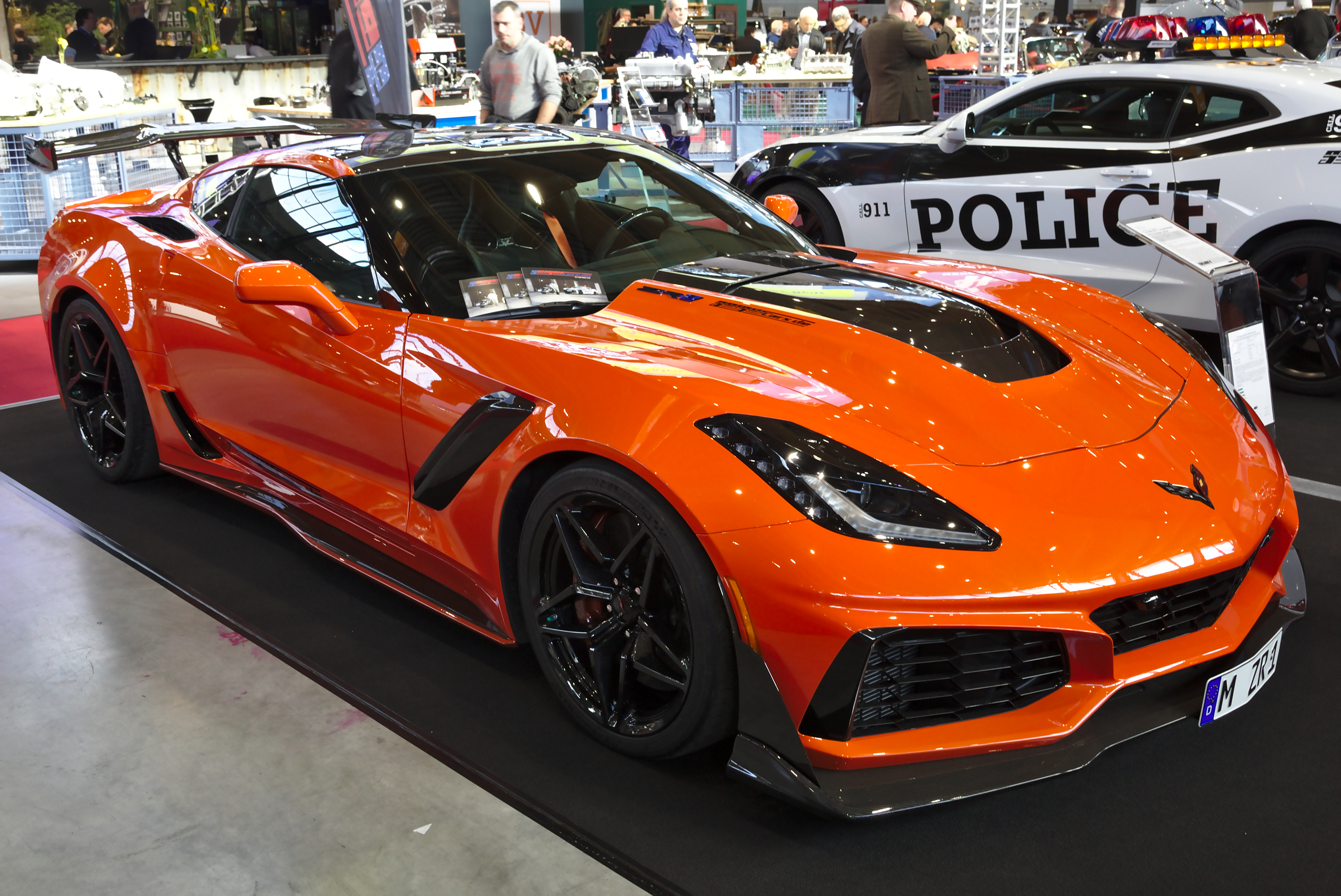
2019 Corvette ZR1

Development for the seventh generation Corvette started in 2007. A prime consideration was countering not just the perception but the fact that the Corvette had become an "old man's toy" - confirmed by an October 2012 GM study which showed that about 46 percent of Corvette buyers were 55 or older, compared with 22 percent of Audi R8 and 30 percent of Porsche 911 customers. The head of Chevy marketing, Chris Perry, acknowledged that too many people saw it as the car of "the successful plumber." John Fitzpatrick, Corvette's marketing manager said "It's the old saying, 'Nobody wants to be seen driving an old man's car, but everybody wants to be seen driving a young man's car.' "

Originally set to be introduced for the 2011 model year, the C7's debut was delayed until the 2014 model year to make changes to make the car more appealing to younger buyers. Mid-engine and rear-engine layouts had been considered, but the front-engine, rear-wheel drive (RWD) platform was retained to keep production costs lower. Promotional efforts towards a new generation of buyers included a camouflaged version of the car was made available in the popular video game Gran Turismo 5 in November 2012, and the C7 being featured as the 2013 Indianapolis 500 pace car, the Corvette's 12th time in that spotlight.

The 2014 Chevrolet Corvette included an LT1 6.2 L V8 (376 cu in) making 455 hp (339 kW; 461 PS) or 460 hp (343 kW; 466 PS) with the optional performance exhaust. The LT1 engine (the "LT1" designation was first used by GM in 1970 and then later in 1992.) is in the Gen V family of small block engines, which was used in GM vehicles as the new small V8 option. It featured three new advanced technologies: direct injection, variable valve timing, and an active fuel management system. Fuel injectors are located under the intake manifold. The Corvette remained rear-wheel drive with the transaxle located in the rear. Transmission choices included a 7-speed manual or a 6-speed (2014) / 8-speed (2015-) automatic with paddle shifters. The new interior included wide-bottom seats as standard, with sportier versions with high side bolsters optional. The Corvette's flag logo was revised for the new car and a small casting of a stingray was added to the car's ornamentation.

Features of the new generation's structure included a carbon fiber hood and removable roof panel. The fenders, doors, and rear quarter panels remained composite. At the rear of the car, the trademark round taillights changed to a more squarish form. The underbody panels were made of "carbon-nano" composite and it made use of a new aluminum frame that located the four wheels an inch farther apart, front to rear and side to side. Luggage space decreased by 33% from the previous generation's. The overall weight of the car was not announced by General Motors for many months after its first showing in January 2013. Despite the increased use of aluminum and other light weight materials, numerous publications reported that the weight would remain essentially unchanged from that of the previous generation's. In August 2013, the weight of the new Corvette was reported to be 3,444 lb (1,562 kg), meaning it would weigh more than the previous generation's C6 ZR1 model (3,324 lb (1,508 kg)), which included a supercharger and intercooler.

Chevrolet announced the C7 Z06 at the 2014 Detroit Auto Show. The 2015 Z06 Corvette produced 650 hp from the supercharged LT4 aluminum 6.2 L V8 engine.

The new generation Corvette resurrected the "Stingray" name. Originally spelled "Sting Ray" on 1963 through 1967 models and "Stingray" from 1969 until 1976.

For the 2015 model, Chevrolet began offering a transaxle version of the 8L90 eight-speed automatic to replace the previous six-speed 6L80.

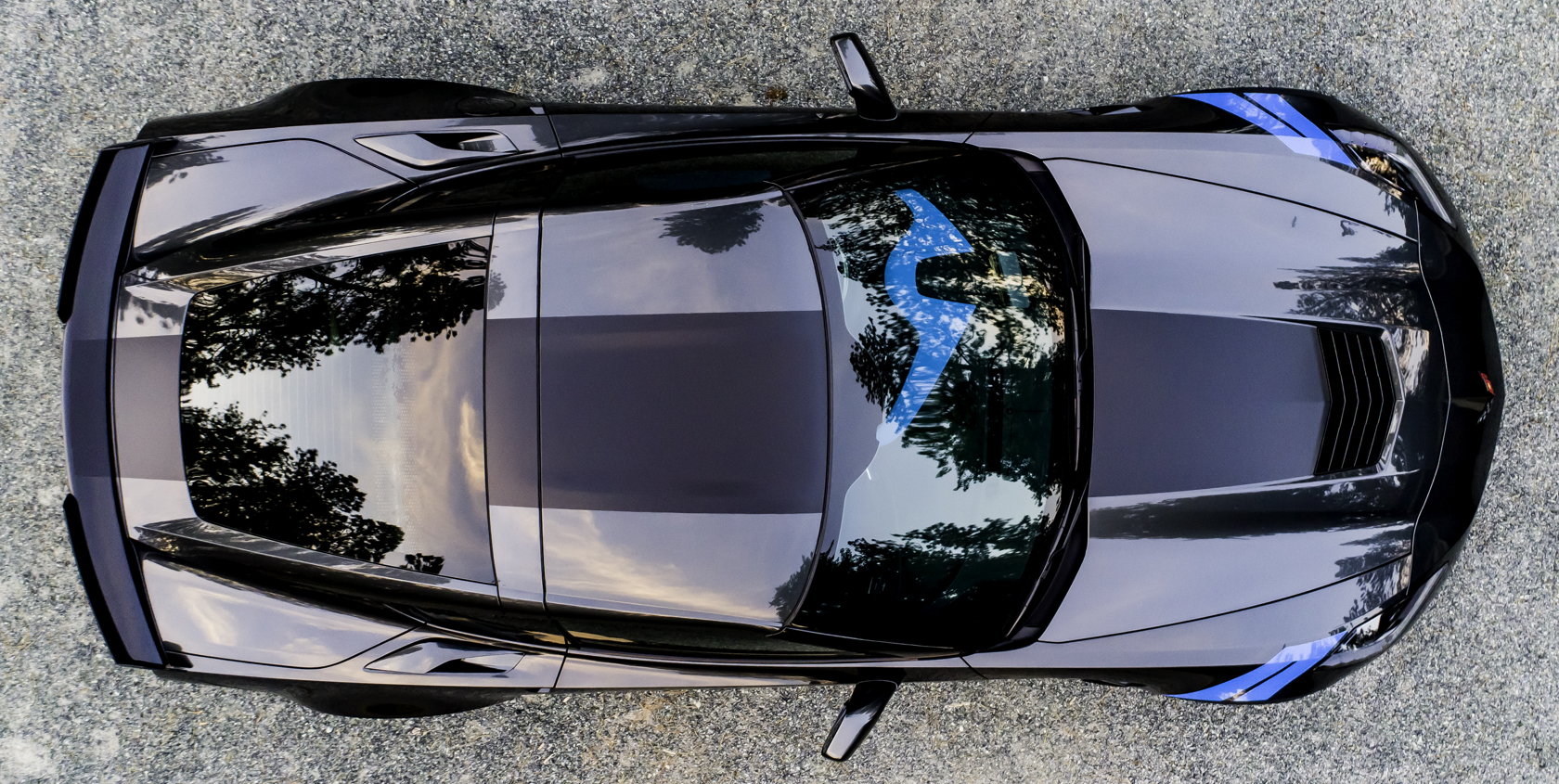
2017 Corvette Grand Sport Collector Edition #43

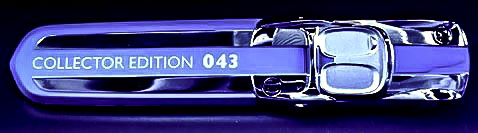
2017 Chevrolet Corvette Grand Sport Collector Edition Dash Plaque

For the 2017 model year Chevrolet once again introduced the Grand Sport (GS) model. This model included Z06 wide-body styling features and suspension tuning along with the Z51 dry sump LT1 engine configuration. Grand Sport models were available in 10 exterior colors and could have the optional Heritage Package which included hash-mark fender graphics (available in six colors. As part of the introduction of the Grand Sport in Geneva, Switzerland, Chevrolet also announced a 2017 Chevrolet Corvette Grand Sport Collector Edition that was to be limited to 1,000 vehicles in total with 850 for the US Market. Final production numbers show 784 Coupes and 151 Convertibles were built; 935 total.

The $4,995 Z25 Option Package was a cosmetic upgrade that contained blue fender hash-marks, two-tone blue leather seating surfaces with a logo on the seat headrest, blue leather stitching, serialized edition numbered dash plaque, and carpeted floor mats with logo,

The ZR1 variant returned for the 2019 model year. The long block of its new LT5 was the same as the LT4, but the supercharger displacement was increased from 1.7 liters to 2.65 liters. The C7 ZR1 power output was 755 horsepower.

The last C7 Corvette (also making it the last front-engined Corvette), a black Z06, was auctioned off on June 28, 2019, for $2.7 million (~$3.35 million in 2025) at the Barrett-Jackson Northeast auction. The auction benefited the Stephen Siller Tunnel to Towers Foundation, which helps pay off mortgages for the families of first responders who were killed in the line of duty and builds "mortgage-free, accessible smart homes" for injured service members.

=== Eighth generation (C8; 2020–present) ===
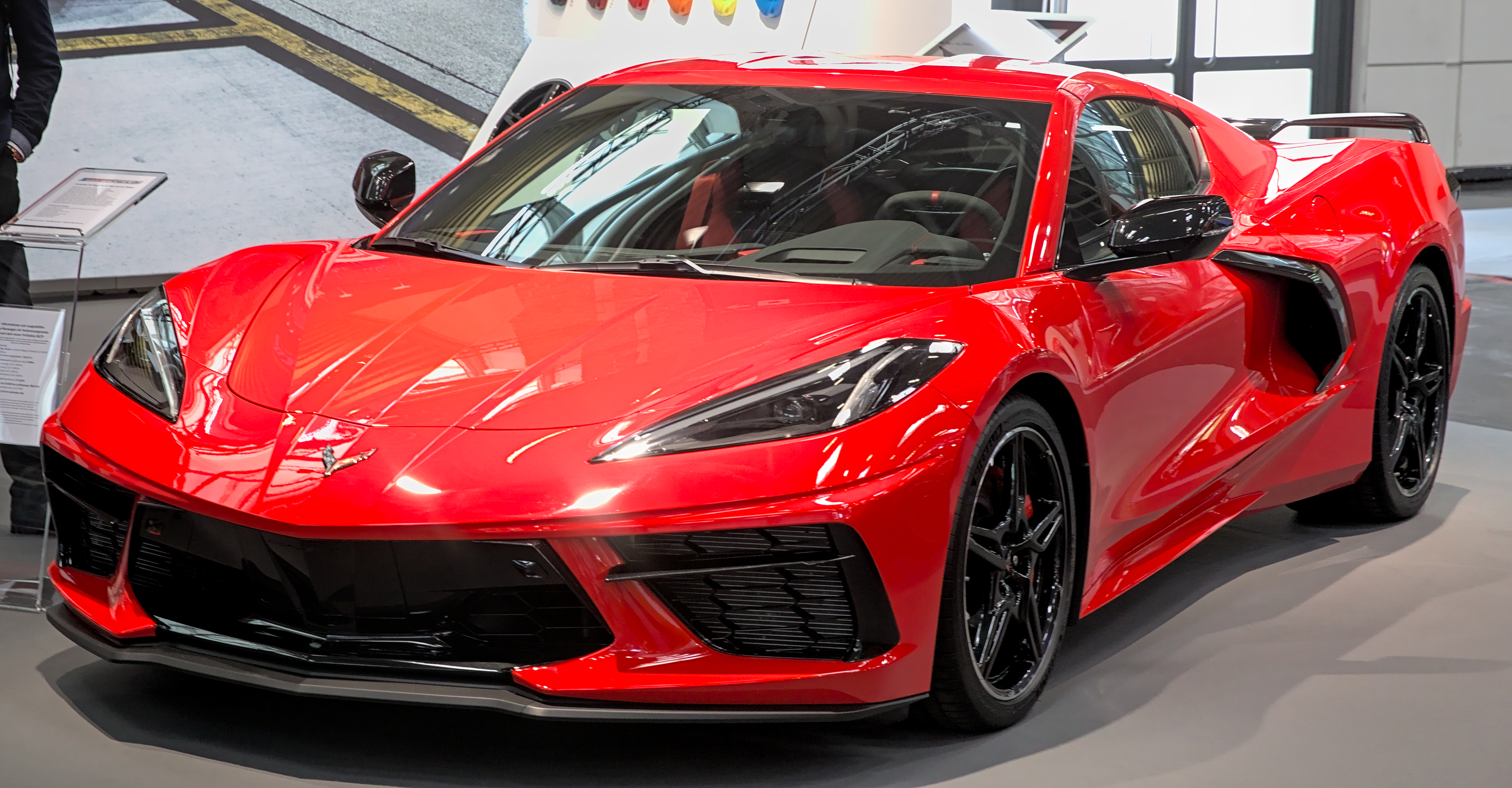
2020 Chevrolet Corvette

Development of the eighth generation corvette began in 2016 for a mid-engine layout. Intentionally set for the 2018 model year but was delayed for 2019 until 2020.

The 2020 Corvette C8 was the first Corvette to have a rear mid-engine configuration, GM's first since the 1984 Pontiac Fiero. The base Stingray coupe was introduced on July 18, 2019, at the Kennedy Space Center with three launch colors, red (with the Z51 Package), white, and blue, and the convertible on October 2 joined by the C8.R race car, which took part at the 2020 24 Hours of Daytona.

The base engine is the 6.2 liter naturally aspirated LT2 V8, which generates 495 hp (369 kW; 502 PS) and 470 lb⋅ft (637 N⋅m) of torque when equipped with either the performance exhaust package or Z51 performance package. The C8 is the first Corvette to be offered without a traditional manual transmission since all 1982 Corvettes were built with a 4-speed auto with overdrive, and the convertible is the first Corvette with a retractable hardtop.

In January 2020 the car became the most expensive charity vehicle that week at the Barrett-Jackson auction, selling for $3 million (~$3.67 million in 2025). The proceeds of the sale went to the Detroit Children's Fund.

The LT2 saw fuel management system upgrades for the 2022 model year which featured a new fuel pump and injectors. The base price was also increased by $1200. A new IMSA GTLM Championship Edition package, limited to 1000 units, was introduced for 2022.

The Corvette C8 Z06 debuted in the 2023 model year. It features the LT6, a 670 hp (500 kW), 5.5 liter, DOHC flat-plane crank V8 – the most powerful naturally aspirated production V8. The Z06 is redlined at 8600 rpm and features the same dual-clutch transmission as the Stingray, with gearing changes specific to the performance of this model.

The Corvette C8 E-Ray was unveiled on January 17, 2023, as a 2024 model year vehicle. It is the first production Corvette to include front wheel drive electric motor components. The Hybrid powertrain features a combined 655 hp (488 kW) generated from a 6.2L LT2 V8, coupled with an e-motor powering the front wheels. It listed at over $122,000 before options.

The Corvette C8 ZR1 was unveiled on June 25, 2024, as a 2025 model year vehicle. It was referred to by Chevrolet as the "King of the Hill" and featured 1,064 hp (1,079 PS; 793 kW) and 828 lb⋅ft (1,123 N⋅m) of torque from a 5.5L twin turbo flat-plane crank V8. The car can accelerate from 0-60 mph in 2.3 seconds and complete the quarter mile in 9.6 seconds at 150 mph. Both were best ever figures for Corvette. The starting price for the C8 ZR1 was announced at $174,996 before options.

The Corvette ZR1X, introduced for the 2026 model year, is a hybrid variant of the C8 Corvette, combining the twin-turbocharged 5.5L LT7 V8 engine from the ZR1 with an upgraded version of the electric motor and all-wheel-drive system from the E-Ray. It is reported to produce a combined 1,250 hp (932 kW; 1,267 PS), making it the most powerful Corvette ever produced. Chevrolet says the ZR1X can achieve a 0–60 mph (97 km/h) time of under 2 seconds and a quarter-mile time of under 9 seconds. The ZR1X set a Nürburgring lap time of 6:49.275, beating the Ford Mustang GTD to set a new lap record for an American production car.

The 2027 model year has a new top speed of 200 mph making this the fastest Corvette model to reach the double-century mark.

== Awards ==
Over the years, the Corvette has won awards from automobile publications as well as organizations such as the Society of Automotive Engineers.

- Automobile Magazine ranked the 1963–1967 Sting Ray first on their "100 Coolest Cars" list, above the Dodge Viper GTS, the Porsche 911, and others. In 2013, Automobile Magazine selected the Corvette C7 as its "Automobile of the Year".
- Sports Car International placed the Corvette at number 5 on their list of the "Top Sports Cars of the 1960s".
- Hot Rod magazine in its March 1986 issue selected the 1973–74 Corvette LS6 454 as one of the "10 most collectable muscle cars" in the company of 1968–70 Chevelle, 1970 'Cuda, 1970 Challenger, 1966–67 Fairlane, 1968–70 AMX, 1970 Camaro Z28, 1968–70 GTO, 1968–69 Charger, and 1967–68 Mustang.
- Car and Driver readers selected the Corvette "Best all around car" nine out of eleven years in Car and Driver's Reader's Choice Polls including 1971, 1972, 1973, 1974, and 1975.
- Car and Driver magazine selected the Corvette for its annual Ten Best list sixteen times: the C4 from 1985 through 1989, the C5 in 1998, 1999, and 2002 through 2004, the C6 from 2005 through 2009, and the C7 in 2014.
- Motor Trend magazine named the Corvette Car of the Year in 1984, 1998, and 2020.
- Society of Automotive Engineers publication Automotive Engineering International selected the 1999 Corvette Convertible, (along with the Mercedes-Benz S500) "Best Engineered Car of the 20th century".
- The 2005 Corvette was nominated for the North American Car of the Year award and was named "Most Coveted Vehicle" in the 2006 Canadian Car of the Year contest.
- U.S. News & World Report selected the 2010 Corvette the "Best Luxury Sports Car for the Money".
- Edmunds.com, in its "100 Best Cars Of All Time" list, ranked the 1963 Corvette Stingray as the 16th best car ever produced worldwide. The 1990 ZR1 took #50, the 1955 Corvette V8 took #72, and the 2009 ZR1 took #78 overall.
- The 2014 Corvette was nominated for the North American Car of the Year award.
- Motor Trend awarded the C8 Z06 the 2023 Performance Vehicle of the Year award.

== NASA Corvettes ==
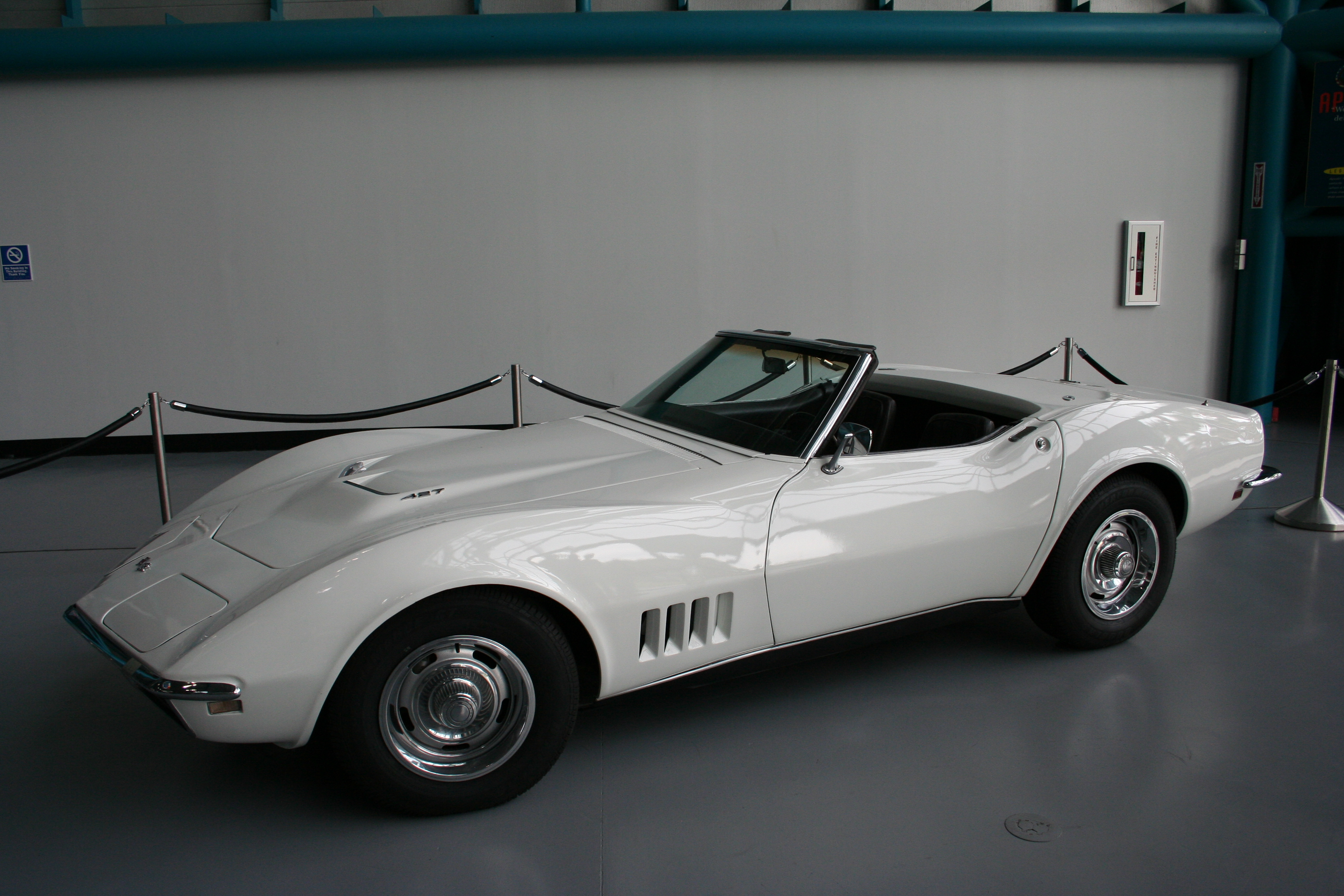
Astronaut Alan Shepard's Corvette on display at the Kennedy Space Center Visitor Complex

Jim Rathmann, a Melbourne, Florida Chevrolet dealer and winner of the 1960 Indy 500, befriended astronauts Alan Shepard, Gus Grissom, and Gordon Cooper. Rathmann convinced GM President Ed Cole to set up a program that supplied each astronaut with a pair of new cars each year. Most chose a family car for their wives and a Corvette for themselves. In his memoir Last Man On The Moon, Gene Cernan describes how this worked. The astronauts received brand-new Corvettes, which they were given the option to purchase at a "used" price after they had been driven 3,000 miles (4,828 km). Alan Bean recalls Corvettes lined up in the parking lot outside the astronaut offices at the Johnson Space Center in Houston, and friendly races between Shepard and Grissom along the Florida beach roads and on beaches as local police turned a blind eye. Shepard, Grissom and Cooper even pulled each other on skis in the shallow water. The Mercury and later astronauts were unofficially tied to the Corvette and appeared in official photographs with their cars and with mock-ups of space vehicles such as the Apollo Lunar Module or Lunar Roving Vehicle. Cooper talked of the races along Cocoa Beach in his eulogy of Shepard at the Johnson Space Center in 1998. Shepard, a long-time Corvette owner, was invited by then GM Chief Engineer Zora Arkus-Duntov to drive pre-production Corvette models. General Motors executives later gave Shepard a 1972 model with a Bill Mitchell interior.

== Concept cars ==
Corvette concept cars have inspired the designs of several generations of Corvettes. The first Corvette, Harley Earl's 1953 EX-122 Corvette prototype was itself, a concept show car, first shown to the public at the 1953 GM Motorama at the Waldorf-Astoria Hotel in New York City on January 17, 1953. It was brought to production in six months with only minor changes.

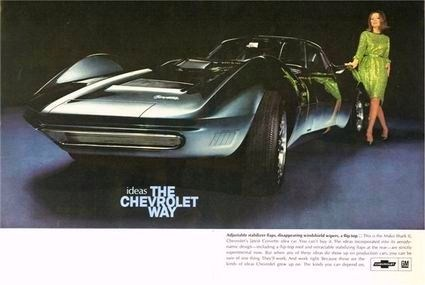
Mako Shark II advertisement (1966)

Harley Earl's successor, Bill Mitchell was the man behind most of the Corvette concepts of the 1960s and 1970s. The second-generation (C2) of 1963 was his, and its design first appeared on the Stingray Racer of 1959. It made its public debut at Maryland's Marlborough Raceway on April 18, 1959, powered by a 283 cu in (4.64 L) V8 with experimental 11:1 compression aluminum cylinder heads and took fourth place. The concept car was raced through 1960 having only "Sting Ray" badges before it was put on the auto-show circuit in 1961.

In 1961, the XP-755 Mako Shark show car was designed by Larry Shinoda as a concept for future Corvettes. In keeping with the name, the streamlining, pointed snout, and other detailing was partly inspired by the look of that very fast fish. The 1961 Corvette tail was given two additional tail lights (six total) for the concept car. The body inspired the 1963 production Sting Ray.

In 1965, Mitchell removed the original concept body and redesigned it as the Mako Shark II. Chevrolet created two of them, only one of which was fully functional. The original Mako Shark was then retroactively called the Mako Shark I. The Mako Shark II debuted in 1965 as a show car and this concept influenced Mitchell's redesigned Corvette of 1968.

The Aerovette has a mid-engine configuration using a transverse mounting of its V8 engine. Zora Arkus-Duntov's engineers originally built two XP-882s during 1969. John DeLorean, Chevy general manager, ordered one for display at the 1970 New York Auto Show. In 1972, DeLorean authorized further work on the XP-882. A near-identical body in aluminum alloy was constructed and became the XP-895 "Reynolds Aluminum Car." Duntov and Mitchell responded with two Chevrolet Vega (stillborn) Wankel two-rotor engines joined as a four-rotor 420 hp (313 kW; 426 PS) engine which was used to power the XP-895. It was first shown in late 1973. The four-rotor show car was outfitted with a 400 cu in (6.6 L) small-block V8 in 1977 and rechristened Aerovette. GM chairman Thomas Murphy approved the Aerovette for 1980 production, but Mitchell's retirement that year, combined with then Corvette chief engineer Dave McLellan's lack of enthusiasm for the mid-engine design and slow-selling data on mid-engined cars kept it from going into production.

A Corvette Stingray Anniversary concept car was unveiled at the 2009 Detroit Auto Show, fifty years after the Sting Ray racer-concept of 1959. The vehicle was based on a combination of the 1963 Sting Ray and the 1968 Stingray. The new Stingray concept appears in the 2009 movie Transformers: Revenge of the Fallen, as the vehicle mode of the character Sideswipe. A convertible/speedster version was used for the same character in the 2011 sequel, Transformers: Dark of the Moon.

During Monterey Car Week in August 2025, Chevrolet executive design director Phil Zak unveiled the Chevrolet Corvette CX, a concept that imagines what a Corvette of the future would look like. A racing version designed under the Vision Gran Turismo program, called the Corvette CX.R Vision Gran Turismo, was also unveiled alongside the CX.

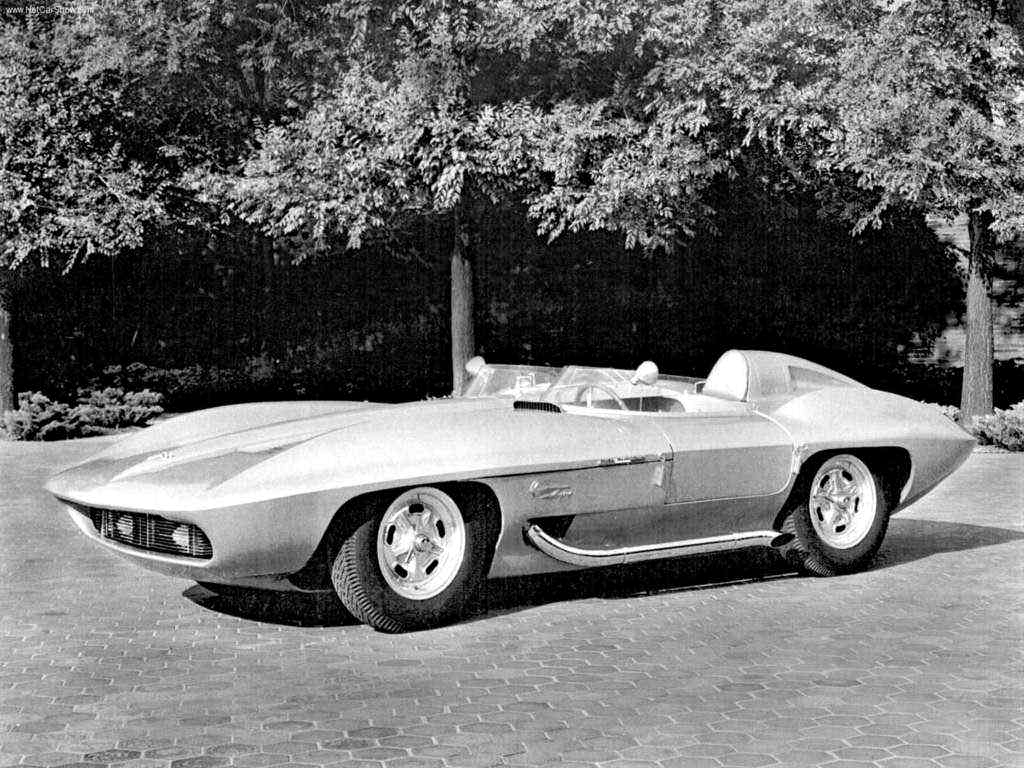
1959 Corvette XP-87 Stingray Racer concept

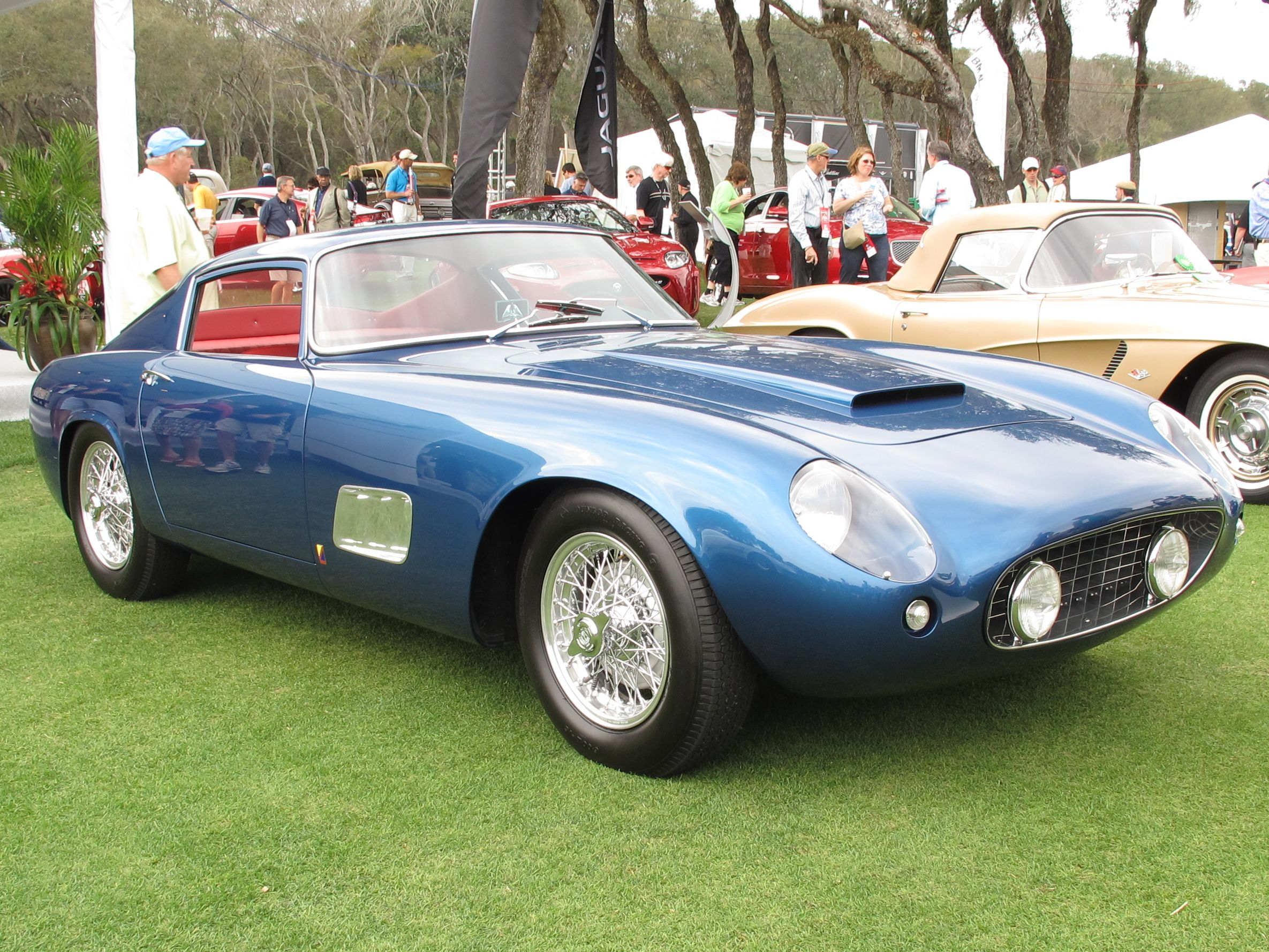
A 1959 Scaglietti Corvette

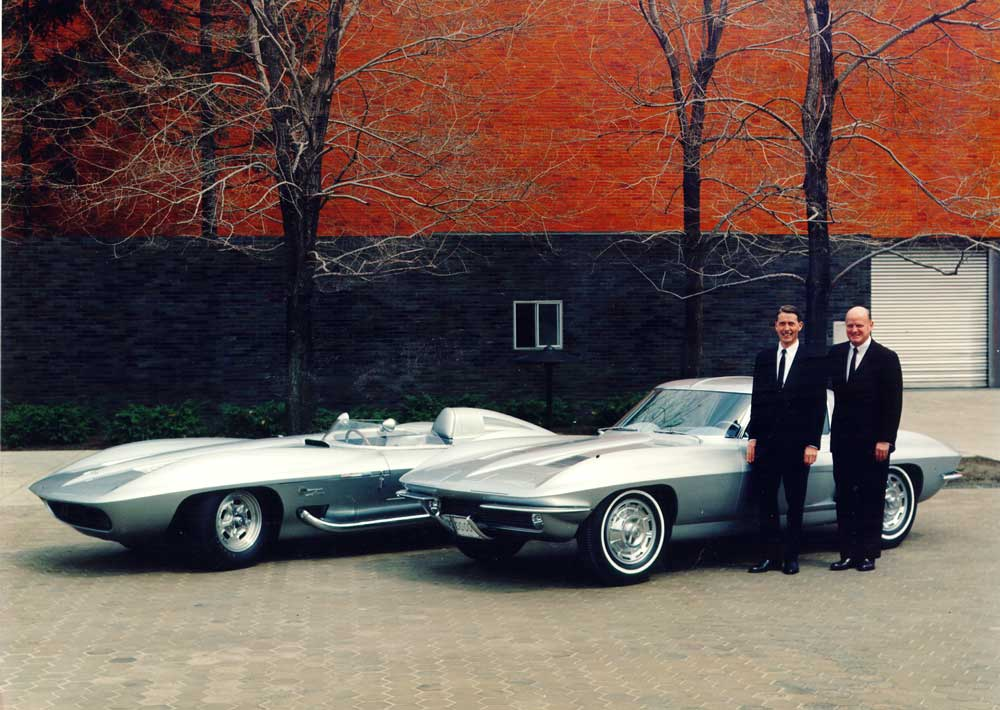
The XP-87 with a 1963 model and designer Bill Mitchell

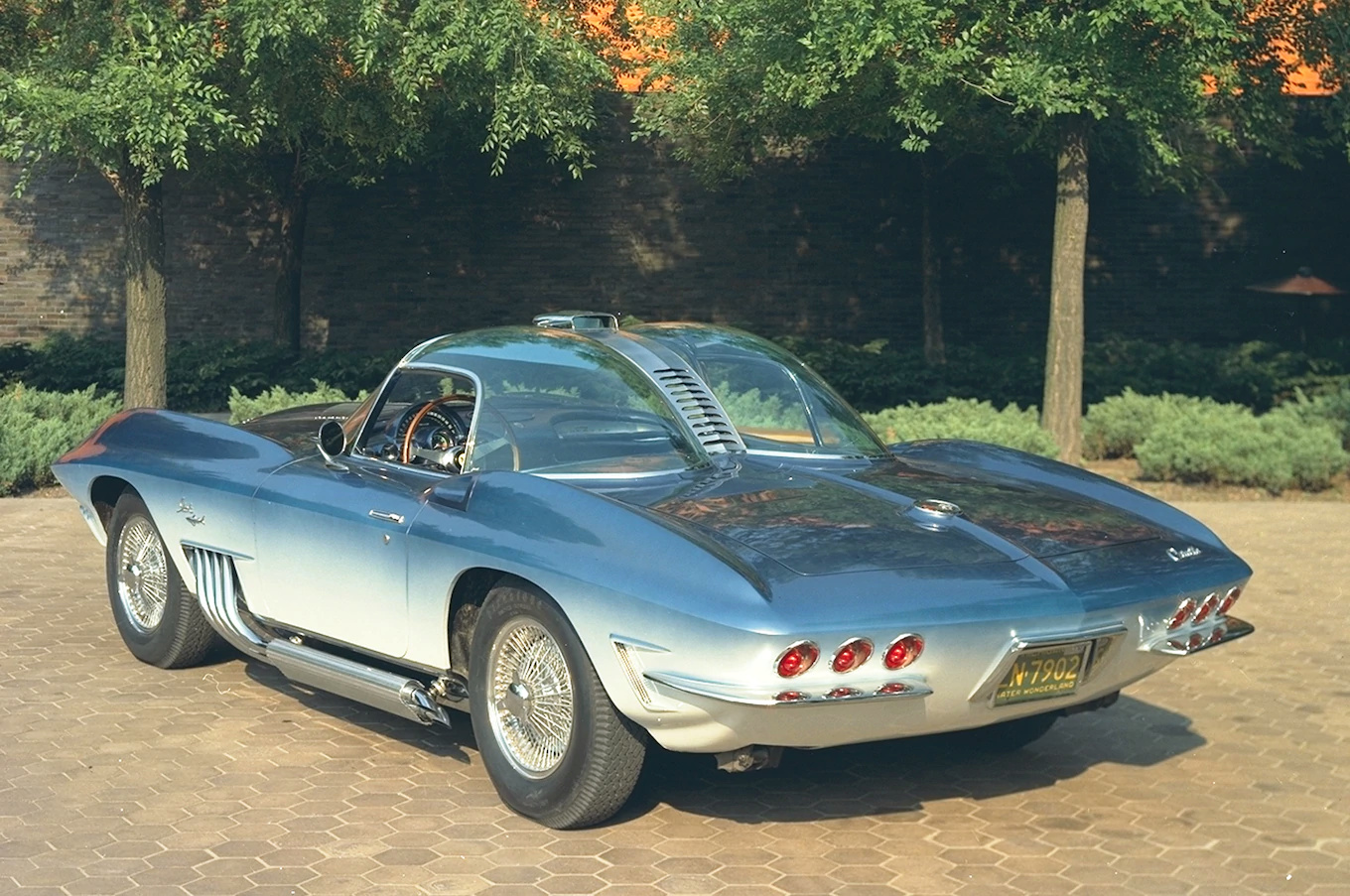
1961 Mako Shark concept

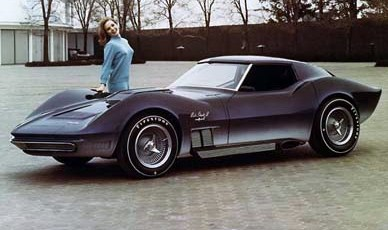
1965 Mako Shark II concept

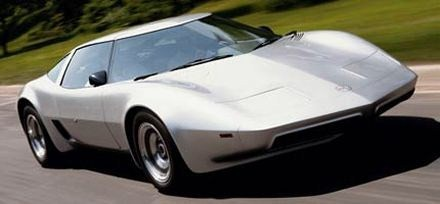
1977 Aerovette concept

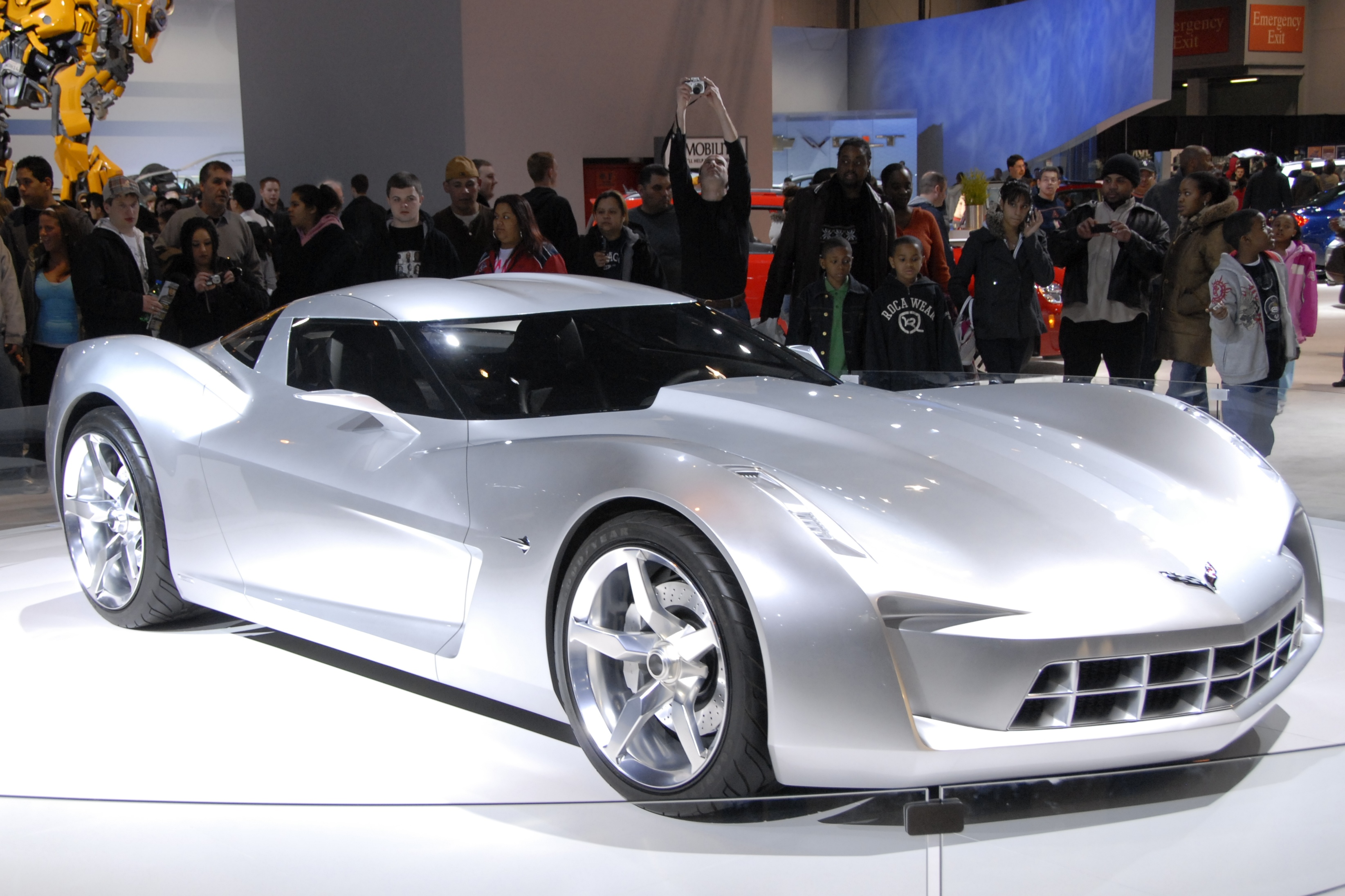
2009 Corvette Stingray concept

== Production ==
Production statistics from when the first-generation of Corvettes was released in 1953 until the present.

	Year	Production	Notes
C1	1953	300	First generation (C1) begins; production starts on June 30; Polo White with red interior and black top is only color combination; Options were interior door handles; "clip in" side curtains were a substitute for roll-up windows.
C1	1954	3,640	Production moves to St. Louis; exterior colors: blue, red, and black are added; beige top color is added, and tailpipes are longer.
C1	1955	700	Both inline-6 and 265 cu in (4.34 L) V8 engines produced; 3-speed manual transmission added late in the model year.
C1	1956	3,467	New body with roll-up windows; V8-only; 3-speed manual transmission becomes standard equipment and Powerglide automatic is optional.
C1	1957	6,339	283 cu in (4.64 L) V8; Optional 4-speed manual and fuel injected engine option added.
C1	1958	9,168	Quad-headlights and longer, face-lifted body; new interior and dash, fake louvers on the hood and chrome strips on trunk lid; the number of "teeth" in grille reduced from 13 to 9.
C1	1959	9,670	First black interior and dash storage bin; only year with a turquoise top; louvers and chrome strips from 1958 removed.
C1	1960	10,261	Minor changes to the interior: red and blue bars on the dash logo, vertical stitching on seats.
C1	1961	10,939	New rear styling, bumpers, and round taillights. New fine-mesh grille.
C1	1962	14,531	327 cu in (5.36 L) V8 engine; last year with a trunk until 1998. New black grille with chrome surround, and chrome rocker panel moldings.
C1	1963	21,513	Second generation (C2) begins; new coupe body style introduced (only year for split rear window); coupe more expensive than the convertible.
C2	1963	21,513	Second generation (C2) begins; new coupe body style introduced (only year for split rear window); coupe more expensive than the convertible.
C2	1964	22,229	Rear backlite windows of coupe changed to single pane window; hood louvers deleted.
C2	1965	23,564	396 cu in (6.49 L) Big-Block V8 added; last year of fuel injected engine option (until 1982-std.); side-discharge exhaust introduced. Manufacturer colors change color code names. 4-wheel disc brakes were introduced.
C2	1966	27,720	427 cu in (7.00 L) Big-Block V8 with unique bulging hood; 327 cu in (5.36 L) 300 hp (224 kW; 304 PS) small block V8 standard. Headrests, 4-way hazard lights, and a day/night rearview mirror were not standard, but available as factory options.
C2	1967	22,940	Five-louver fenders are unique; Big-Block hood bulge redesigned as a scoop; parking brake changed from pull-out under dash handle to lever mounted in the center console; Tri-power 427 would become a sought-after Corvette.
C2	1968	28,566	Third generation (C3) begins; New body and T-top removable roof panels, new interior, engines carried over, three-speed Turbo Hydra-Matic replaces two-speed Powerglide as automatic transmission option.
C3	1968	28,566	Third generation (C3) begins; New body and T-top removable roof panels, new interior, engines carried over, three-speed Turbo Hydra-Matic replaces two-speed Powerglide as automatic transmission option.
C3	1969	38,762	First year of the 350 cu in (5.7 L) Small-Block; longer model year extended to December 1969 due to delay in the introduction of 1970 model; "Stingray" front fender nameplates added, new interior door panels and inserts, 17-inch black-vinyl steering wheel (replaced 18-inch wood-rim wheel).
C3	1970	17,316	First year for the LT-1 Small-Block and 454 cu in (7.44 L) Big-Block; three-speed manual transmission dropped and four-speed manual became standard with Turbo Hydra-Matic available as a no-cost option with all engines except LT-1 350; posi-traction made standard equipment; introduced along with the second-generation Chevrolet Camaro on February 26, 1970, new egg-grate metal front grilles and fender grilles, lower molded fender flares, new hi-back seats and interior trim, the new custom interior option included: leather seat trim, cut-pile carpeting, lower-carpeted door panels, and wood-grain accents.
C3	1971	21,801	Significant power drops due to reduced compression ratios to meet GM corporate edict requiring all engines to run low-octane unleaded gasoline; power ratings based on both "gross" and "net" figures with the former based on engine hooked to a dynamometer while "net" ratings based on power as installed in the vehicle with accessories and emission controls installed.
C3	1972	27,004	Power switched to SAE net figures, last year for LT-1 engine, front and rear chrome bumpers, removable rear window, and windshield wiper door.
C3	1973	30,464	5 mph (8.0 km/h) Front bumper system with a urethane cover, pot-metal front grilles (black with silver edges), chrome rear bumpers unchanged, new design front fender ducts, the first year for radial tires (standard equipment), rubber body mounts, new hood with rear air induction and under-hood insulation, new front-end (round) emblem. cross-flag gas-lid emblem was deleted towards the end of the model year. LS4 454 ci had 275 hp and L82 350 ci had 250 hp SAE net.
C3	1974	37,502	5 mph (8.0 km/h) Rear bumper system with urethane cover to match previous year's front bumper, new recessed taillamps, and down-turned tail-pipes. 1974 is the only year with a two-piece rear bumper cover with a center split. No gas lid emblem was used. Aluminum front grilles (all-black), dual exhaust resonators added, revised radiator cooling and interior a/c ducts, and integrated seat/shoulder belts in the coupe. Last year for a true dual exhaust system, last year for the 454 big-block engine in a Corvette, which was the 270 hp LS4.
C3	1975	38,465	First year of catalytic converter and single-exhaust, black (painted) bumper pads front and rear, redesigned inner-bumper systems, one-piece rear bumper cover, plastic front grilles (all-black), amber parking lamp lenses (replaced the clear lenses on 1973–1974), and new emblems. This was the last year of C3 convertible. The biggest engine was the L82 350 with 205 hp, down from 250 hp in 1974 and 1973. (The Chevrolet Laguna S-3 began the year with a 215 hp 454 but that engine was replaced by a 215 hp 400.)
C3	1976	46,558	First-year for steel floor panels, cold-air induction dropped, new aluminum alloy wheels option, new one-piece rear "Corvette" nameplate (replaces letters). The L82 350 had 210 hp.
C3	1977	49,213	Last year of 1968 flat rear glass design, Black exterior available (last year-1969), new design ""Corvette flags" front end and fender emblems. New interior console and gauges, universal GM radios. The biggest engine was the L82 350 with 210 hp.
C3	1978	46,776	25th Anniversary, New fastback rear window, Silver Anniversary and Indy 500 Pace Car special editions; Pace-car included sport seats and spoilers-front and rear, limited option-glass t-tops; redesigned interior, dash, instruments. The biggest engine was the L82 350 with 220 hp.
C3	1979	53,807	Sport seats (from the previous year's pace-car); front and rear spoilers optional, glass t-tops optional; New interior comfort features; highest Corvette sales year to date. L82 had 225 hp.
C3	1980	40,614	Lightened materials, new hood, front end with molded spoilers, rear bumper cover with molded spoiler and new tail lamps, Federal government required 85 mph (137 km/h) speedometer; California cars powered by 305 V8 and automatic transmission for this year only, last year for L-82 350 with 230 hp. (n/a with manual transmission)
C3	1981	40,606	Production is switched from St. Louis to new Bowling Green plant; 350 cu in (5.7 L) V8 returns in California cars, last year for manual transmission. The only available engine was the L81 350 with 190 hp.
C3	1982	25,407	New cross-fire fuel-injected L83 350 with 200 hp. New automatic overdrive transmission. Collectors Edition features an exclusive hatch rear window – is one-fourth of production.
C3	1983	43	This model year was canceled, and all Corvettes produced this year were serialized as 1984 models. Featured L69 HO 305 with 200 hp.
C4	1983	43	This model year was canceled, and all Corvettes produced this year were serialized as 1984 models. Featured L69 HO 305 with 200 hp.
C4	1984	51,547	Fourth generation (C4) begins: hatchback body; digital instrumentation; L83 350 continued from 1982 with 205 hp instead of a L69.
C4	1985	39,729	More powerful and fuel efficient L98 350 introduced with 230 hp.
C4	1986	35,109	First convertible since 1975. Third brake light, anti-lock brakes, and key-code anti-theft system are new. The L98 350 continued with 230 hp.
C4	1987	30,632	Callaway twin-turbo offered through dealers with GM warranty. The L98 350 had 240 hp.
C4	1988	22,789	New wheel design; all white 35th Anniversary special edition coupe. The L98 350 continued with 240 hp.
C4	1989	26,412	ZF 6-speed manual replaces Doug Nash 4+3.
C4	1990	23,646	ZR-1 is introduced with DOHC LT5 engine. The Interior was redesigned to incorporate a driver's-side airbag.
C4	1991	20,639	Restyled exterior; last year for the Callaway B2K twin turbo.
C4	1992	20,479	New LT1 engine replaces the L98; Traction control is standard.
C4	1993	21,590	Passive keyless entry is standard; 40th Anniversary special edition in Ruby Red.
C4	1994	23,330	New interior including passenger airbag. LT1 engine gains mass air flow metered SFI.
C4	1995	20,742	Last year of the ZR-1; minor exterior restyling; Indy Pace Car special edition.
C4	1996	21,536	Optional LT4 engine with 330 bhp (246 kW). Collectors Edition and Grand Sport special editions. First year with OBD II diagnostics.
C4	1997	9,752	Fifth generation (C5) begins; LS1 engine is new; the hatchback coupé is the only body style offered.
C5	1997	9,752	Fifth generation (C5) begins; LS1 engine is new; the hatchback coupé is the only body style offered.
C5	1998	31,084	Convertible C5 debuts with the first trunk in a Corvette convertible since 1962; Indianapolis 500 Pace Car replica offered; Active Handling System introduced as optional equipment.
C5	1999	33,270	Less-expensive hardtop coupé is offered.
C5	2000	33,682	Newly styled alloy wheels debut.
C5	2001	35,627	Hardtop coupé body style becomes top-performance Z06, utilizing the new LS6 engine and suspension improvements; Second-Generation Active Handling System becomes standard equipment on all models; slight (5 bhp (4 kW)) increase in base model engine power.
C5	2002	35,767	20 bhp (15 kW) increase for the Z06 to 405 bhp.
C5	2003	35,469	50th Anniversary Edition package offered for Coupe and Convertible base models; F55 Magnetic Selective Ride Control Suspension supersedes F45 Selective Ride Control Suspension as base-model option.
C5	2004	34,064	24 Hours of Le Mans Commemorative Edition package offered for all models.
C5	2005	37,372	Sixth generation (C6) begins; New body is first with fixed headlamps since 1962; no Z06 model and a late convertible introduction.
C6	2005	37,372	Sixth generation (C6) begins; New body is first with fixed headlamps since 1962; no Z06 model and a late convertible introduction.
C6	2006	34,021	Z06 debuts; 6-speed automatic with paddle shift available on non-Z06 models.
C6	2007	40,561	6-speed automatic paddle shift delays are reduced drastically compared to 2006.
C6	2008	35,310	Mild freshening, LS3 introduced, All leather interior added (4LT, LZ3).
C6	2009	16,956	ZR1 model added, new "Spyder" wheels for Z06.
C6	2010	12,194	Grand Sport Coupe and Convertible added; replaces the Z51 performance package, launch control standard on MN6 models.
C6	2011	13,596	Wheel choices are updated; Larger cross-drilled brake rotors (13.4" front and 12.8" rear) available on coupe and convertible, or included with (F55) Magnetic Selective Ride Control. Z07 Performance Package introduced for Z06.
C6	2012	11,647	Upgraded interior and new tires on the base model. Z06 acquires a full-length rear spoiler and a carbon fiber hood as options. ZR1 gets adjusted gears for better fuel economy. ZR1 Performance Package introduced, Z07 Performance Package tweaked with new wheels.
C6	2013	13,466	Introduction of "427 Convertible" model with a limited production run of 2,552 "427" units. 9-month production run.
C6	2014	37,288	Seventh generation (C7) begins; All new styling, chassis and drivetrain. LT1 6162 cc 376 ci had 455 hp (460 hp with performance exhaust).
C7	2014	37,288	Seventh generation (C7) begins; All new styling, chassis and drivetrain. LT1 6162 cc 376 ci had 455 hp (460 hp with performance exhaust).
C7	2015	34,240	C7 Z06 debuts with LT4 6162 cc 376 ci that had 650 hp. 8L90 eight-speed automatic transmission offered in all models.
C7	2016	40,689	
C7	2017	32,782	The C7 Grand sport was introduced with the LT1 in a Z06 body and chassis.
C7	2018	9,686	
C7	2019	34,822	The C7 ZR1 was introduced with a LT5 6162 cc 376 ci that had 755 hp.
C8
C8	2020	20,368	Eighth generation (C8) begins; New chassis and body is first mid-engine Corvette. New LT2 motor with 495 hp (Z51 performance package). The C8 shares less than 5% of its parts with the previous C7 generation.
C8	2021	26,139	Convertible introduced as late 2020 model.
C8	2022	25,831	Z06 introduced as 2023 model.
C8	2023	53,785	Z06 begins production. E-Ray introduced as 2024 model.
C8	2024	42,934	E-Ray begins production. ZR1 introduced as 2025 model.
C8	2025	25,835	ZR1 begins production. ZR1X introduced as 2026 model.
C8	2026	?	ZR1X begins production? Grand Sport rumored to be introduced as 2027 model, but no confirmation of this besides spy photos of camouflaged vehicles on social media.
C8	2027	?	?
Total		1,909,902	

== Owner demographics ==
According to research by Specialty Equipment Market Association and Experian Automotive, as of 2009, there were approximately 750,000 Corvettes of all model years registered in the United States. Corvette owners were fairly equally distributed throughout the country, with the highest density in Michigan (3.47 per 1000 residents) and the lowest density in Utah, Mississippi, and Hawaii (1.66, 1.63, and 1.53 registrations per 1000 residents). Of them, 47% hold college degrees (significantly above the nationwide average of 27%), and 82% are between the ages of 40 and 69 (median age being 53).

== Racing ==
The Corvette has maintained a continuous presence in motor racing for several decades, beginning as far back as 1956. It has been a highly successful platform, winning numerous titles in both domestic and international racing series, as well as major racing events including ten class victories at the 24 Hours of Le Mans as of 2026. Racing programs involving the Corvette have generally received support from General Motors in varying degrees.

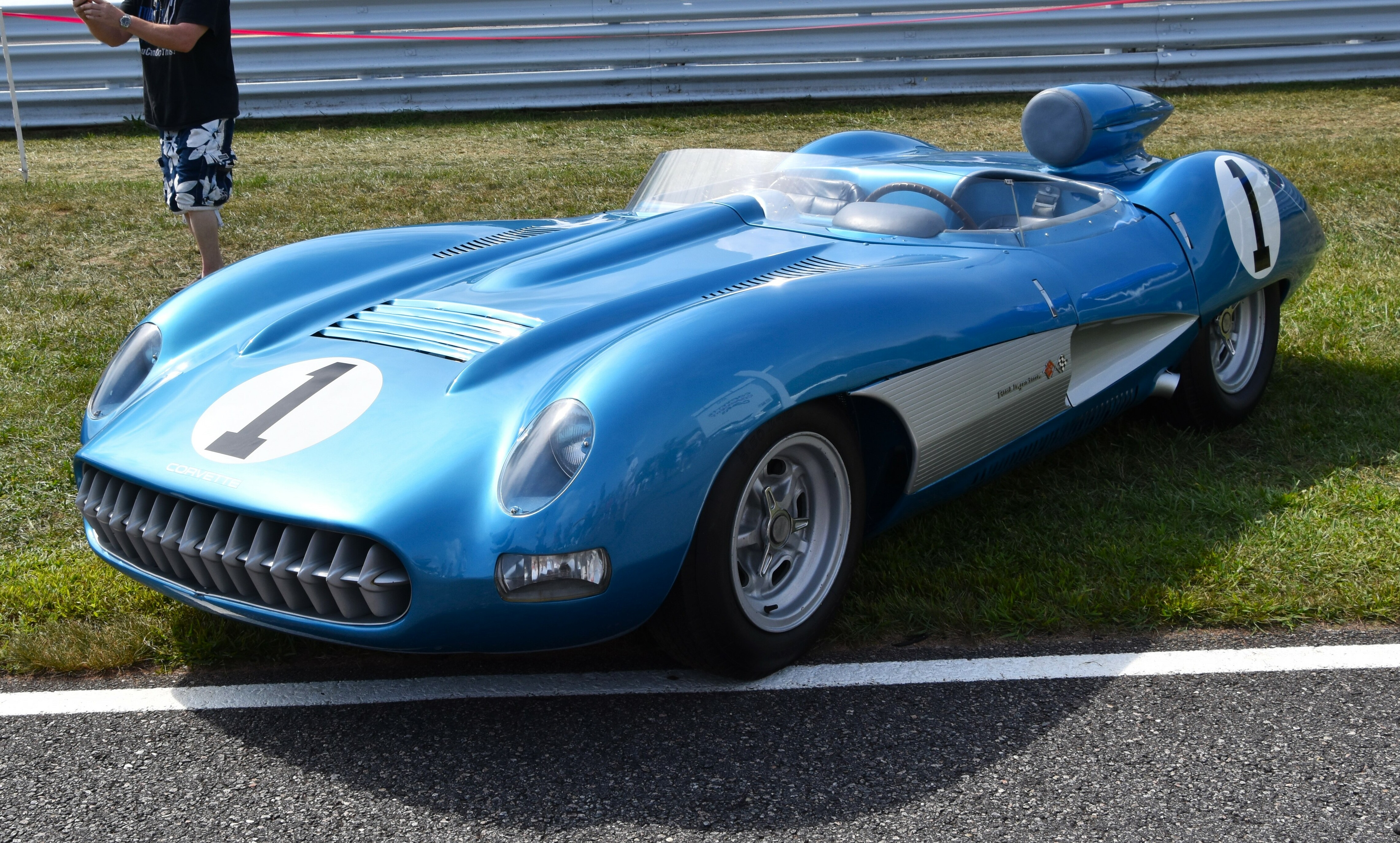
The Corvette SS was Chevrolet's first purpose-built race car, and is one of the earliest known Corvettes to go racing.

The first examples of a Corvette participating in a motor race came in 1956, when General Motors engineer Zora Arkus-Duntov, who was convinced that having Corvettes in racing would lead to increased sales, took three Corvettes to Daytona Speedweek in February of that year, with a team consisting of him, John Fitch, and Betty Skelton. A quartet of Corvettes were later entered at the 1956 12 Hours of Sebring. General Motors executive Ed Cole, who watched the race at Sebring, realized that only a Corvette built specifically for racing stood a chance of winning against the competition. With a six-month window to prepare the car for the 1957 12 Hours of Sebring, the company's first purpose-built racer, the Corvette SS was built in 1957. It eventually made the race, although it would turn out to be its only start, as Chevrolet withdrew the car from all racing activities in response to a ban that occurred that year by the Automobile Manufacturers Association for all of its member companies, which included General Motors. Four years later in 1960, Briggs Cunningham and his team modified three C1 generation Corvettes to compete in the 1960 24 Hours of Le Mans. The cars were numbered #1, #2, and #3, the last of which won the big-bore GT5.0 class, finishing 8th overall, driven by Fitch and Bob Grossman.

In 1984, General Motors funded a program in the 1985 IMSA GT Championship to run an IMSA GTP prototype under the Corvette name as part of their initiative to promote the new C4 generation Corvette, developed with Lola Cars and mostly run by Hendrick Motorsports. Known as the Chevrolet Corvette GTP, it shared very little with the production car, including the lack of a V8 engine in some races, though it did use its styling cues. The project lasted until 1988 with mixed results. A production-based C4 race car later made a brief appearance in sports car racing in a project by former Corvette Cup driver Doug Rippie. It competed in the popular GT1 class in 1995.

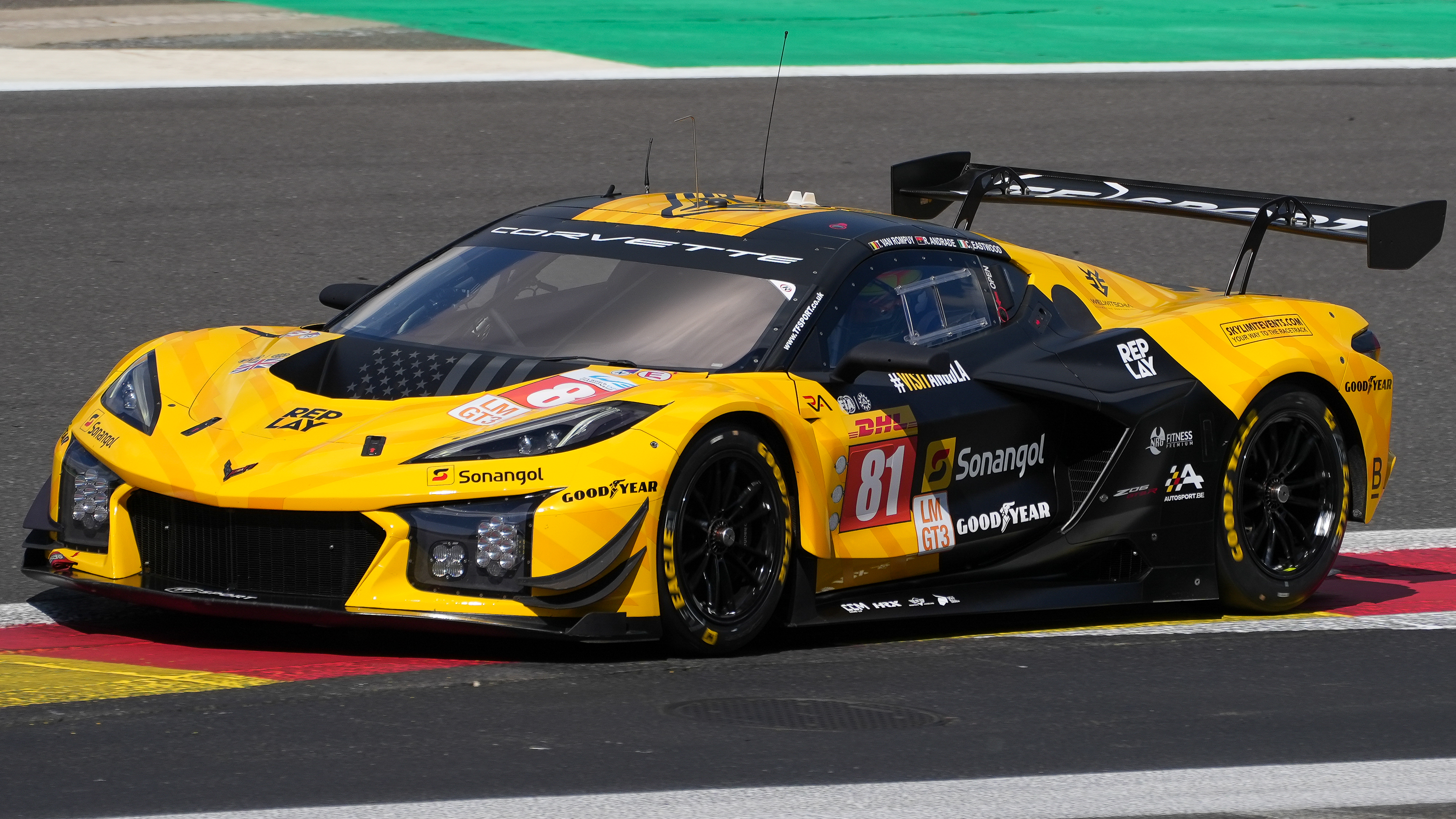
The Corvette Z06 GT3.R is the latest factory racing Corvette to compete globally.

The Corvette continues to compete worldwide through the Chevrolet Corvette Z06 GT3.R, which succeeded both the C8.R, the final car to come from the factory Corvette Racing program, and the C7 GT3-R by Callaway Cars, the first factory-backed Corvette developed under Group GT3 specification. It was unveiled in 2023 following a two-year testing program, beginning with virtual simulation tests in early 2021, later moving to on-track testing over the next two years. Its GT3 predecessor, Callaway's C7 GT3-R, was successful during its tenure, winning the 2017 ADAC GT Masters overall championship with Jules Gounon.

=== Corvette Racing ===
General Motors, in partnership with Michigan-based industrial company Pratt Miller, previously ran a factory GT racing program with the Corvette under the name Corvette Racing, an operation that fielded four generations of the Corvette in competition with high levels of success. The factory partnership lasted for 24 years from 1999 until 2023, following the discontinuation of the LM GTE class and General Motors shifting their focus towards customer teams. Beginning in 2024, the team rebranded as a support team under the name 'Corvette Racing by Pratt Miller Motorsports'. Corvette Racing currently supports teams such as Pratt Miller Motorsports in a number of series including the FIA World Endurance Championship, GT World Challenge, and IMSA SportsCar Championship.

==== C5-R ====
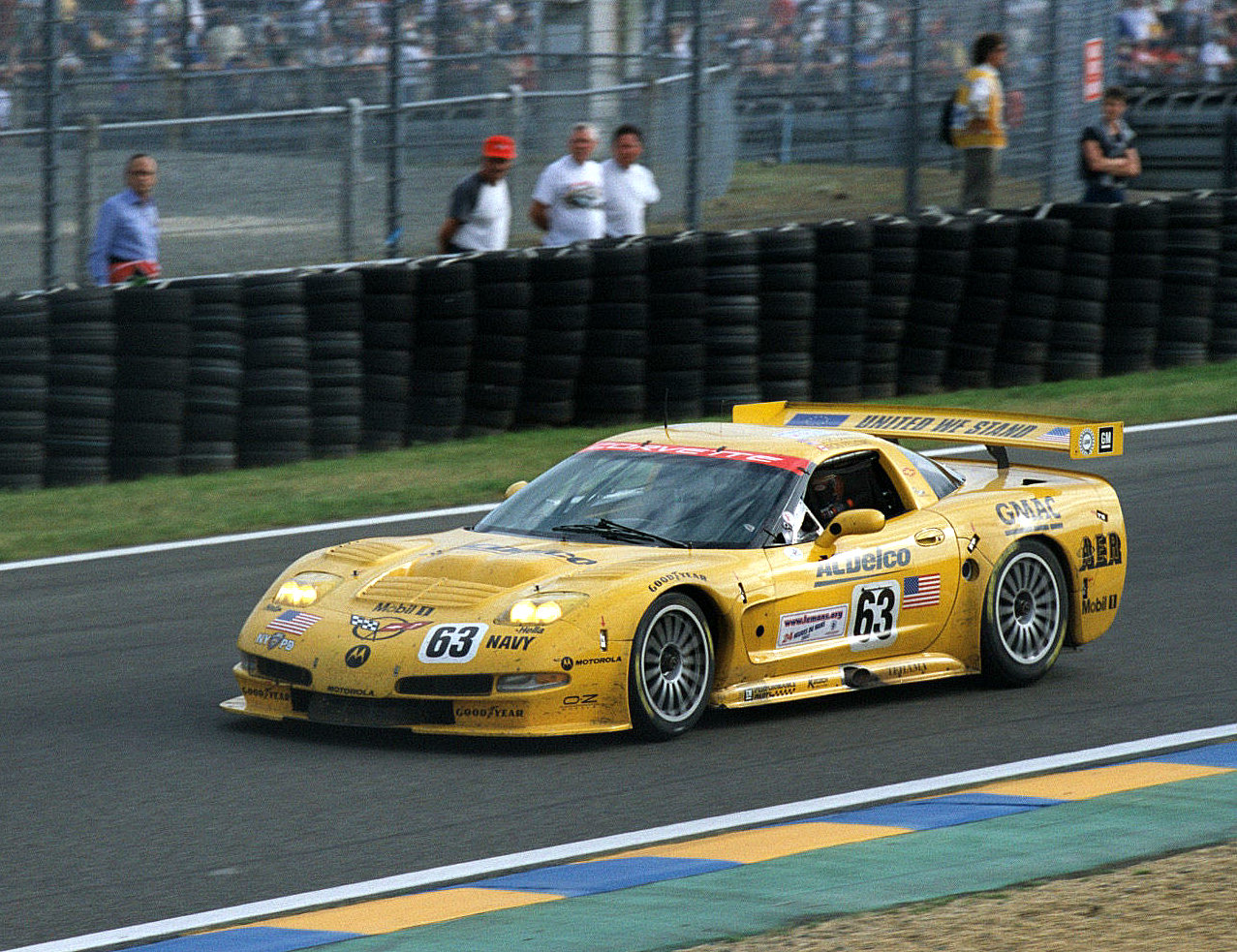
Corvette Racing's C5-R at the 2002 24 Hours of Le Mans, which won that year.

In the late '90s, General Motors and Pratt Miller came together to create a factory team to participate in grand touring races not only in North America, but also elsewhere in the world. General Motors, who had historically been against providing factory support for Corvette racing programs at the time, chose to show the performance capabilities of the new C5 generation Corvette through racing.

After rigorous testing using mules, the Chevrolet Corvette C5-R came to be, debuting in 1999. It became one of the most dominant cars in GT racing, with wins at the 24 Hours of Daytona, 12 Hours of Sebring, and 24 Hours of Le Mans, as well as championships in the American Le Mans Series. The C5-R was succeeded by the C6.R in 2005, although some models continued racing for a couple of years beyond the car's lifespan.

==== C6.R ====
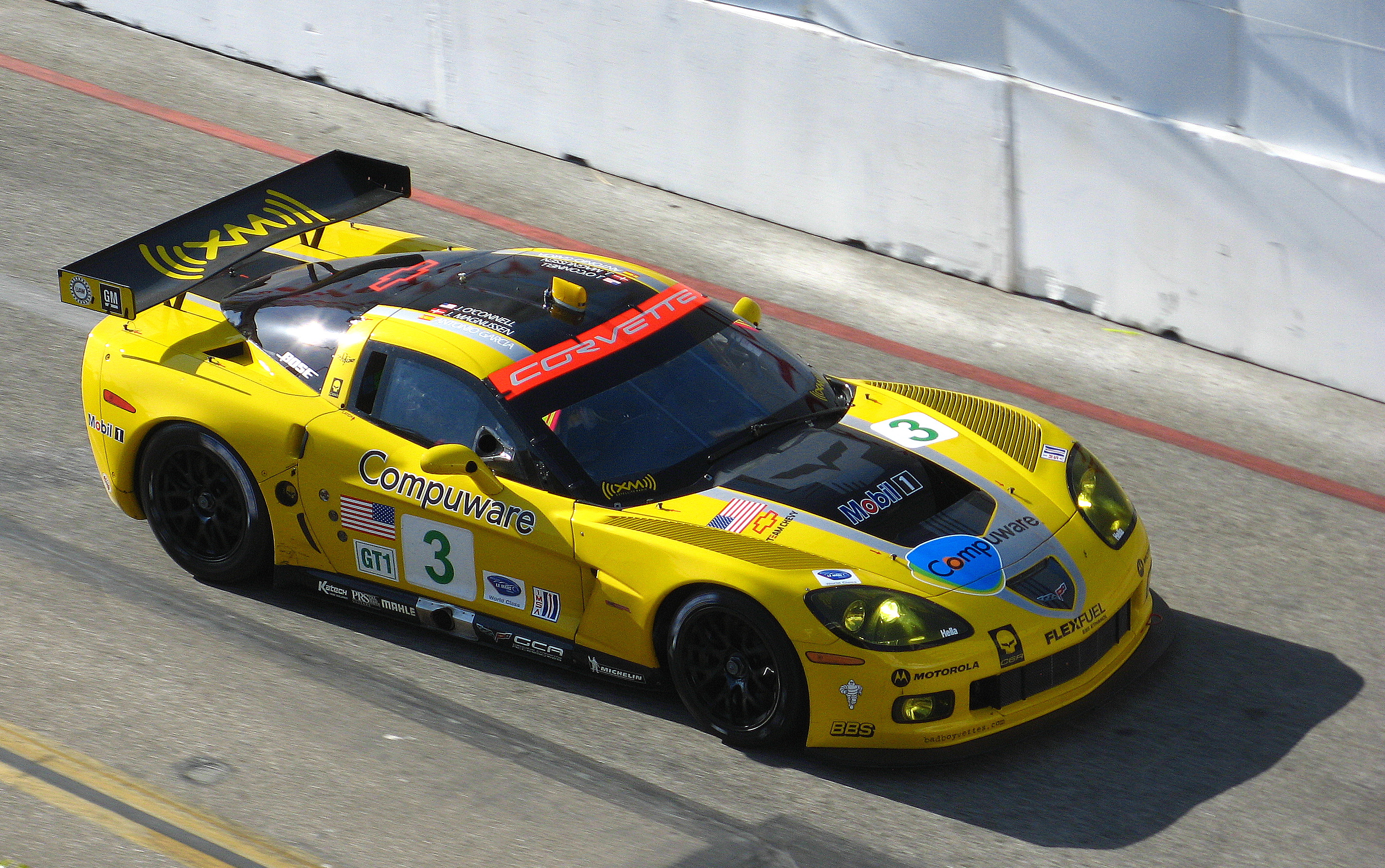
The GT1 version of the C6.R at the 2009 American Le Mans Series at Long Beach.

The Chevrolet Corvette C6.R replaced the C5-R in 2005, applying the body style of the new C6 generation Corvette as well as added improvements to increase speed and reliability on the track. Unlike its predecessor, the C6.R was developed alongside the production car. Two versions of the C6.R were developed during the car's lifespan; the Group GT1 version which shared elements with the Z06 model, and the GT2 version that was based on the ZR1. The C6.R has the most wins collected by a Corvette developed from the General Motors-Pratt Miller operation, collecting 78 wins in nine years of competition.

Corvette Racing began racing the C6.R in 2005, while private teams, primarily in Europe, continued to race the C5-R for a couple of years before switching to the new car. The C6.R was immediately competitive, winning its class in nine out of ten races entered in the 2005 American Le Mans Series. By the end of 2009, Corvette had clinched four consecutive American Le Mans Series GT1 Teams' and Manufacturers' titles (2005, 2006, 2007, 2008) and three 24 Hours of Le Mans class victories in the LMGT1 category (2005, 2006, 2009). The last official race for factory GT1 class Corvettes was the 2009 24 Hours of Le Mans.

While some privateers continued to use the GT1 version of the C6.R in Europe, Corvette Racing switched from the lingering GT1 category to the much more competitive and popular GT2 class in mid-2009. The new car used a modified version of the ZR1 model body, though it did not retain the GT1 version's LS7.R engine and instead used a smaller capacity V8 that was considerably more restricted and less powerful due to the GT2 rules being based more on production vehicles. The car debuted at the 2009 Sports Car Challenge of Mid-Ohio. At Le Mans, the C6.R raced in 2011 securing both GT class wins, with Corvette Racing and Larbre Compétition taking home the GTE Pro and GTE Am classes respectively. The C6.R regained the American Le Mans Series titles in 2012 and 2013, winning four out of ten races in the former and five out of ten races in the latter.

==== C7.R ====
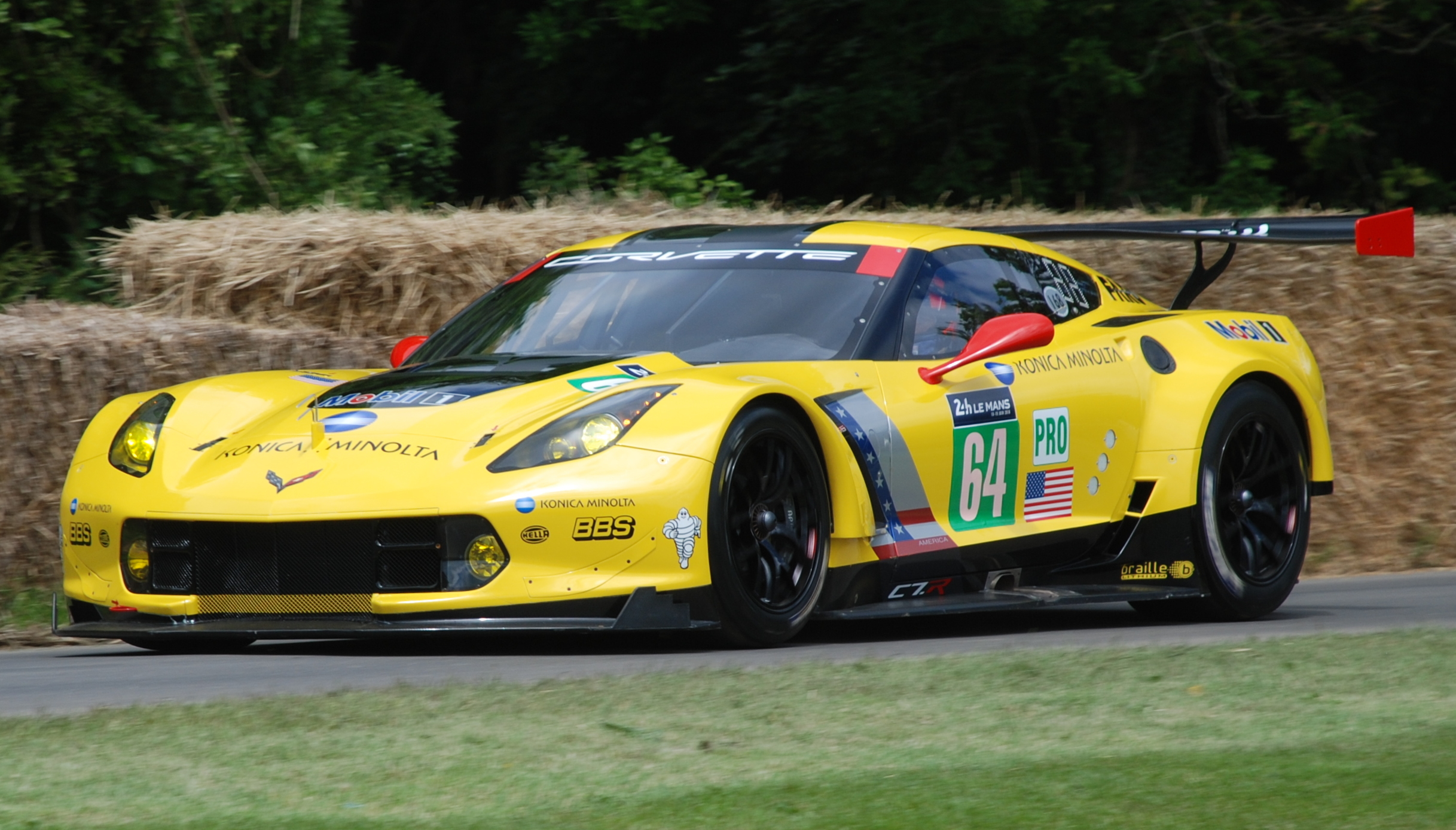
The Chevrolet Corvette C7.R at the 2016 Goodwood Festival of Speed.

The Chevrolet Corvette C7.R was officially unveiled at the 2014 North American International Auto Show, and later completed its first testing appearance, in camouflage, at the Rolex Motorsports Union at Laguna Seca. It was quickly competitive in its first year of competition, it won four races in a row and finished 2nd overall behind rival competitors Dodge and their SRT Viper GTS-R. The C7.R won three consecutive IMSA SportsCar Championship Drivers' and Teams' titles each in 2016, 2017, and 2018, won the 24 Hours of Daytona twice in 2015 and 2016, and the 24 Hours of Le Mans in 2015.

==== C8.R ====
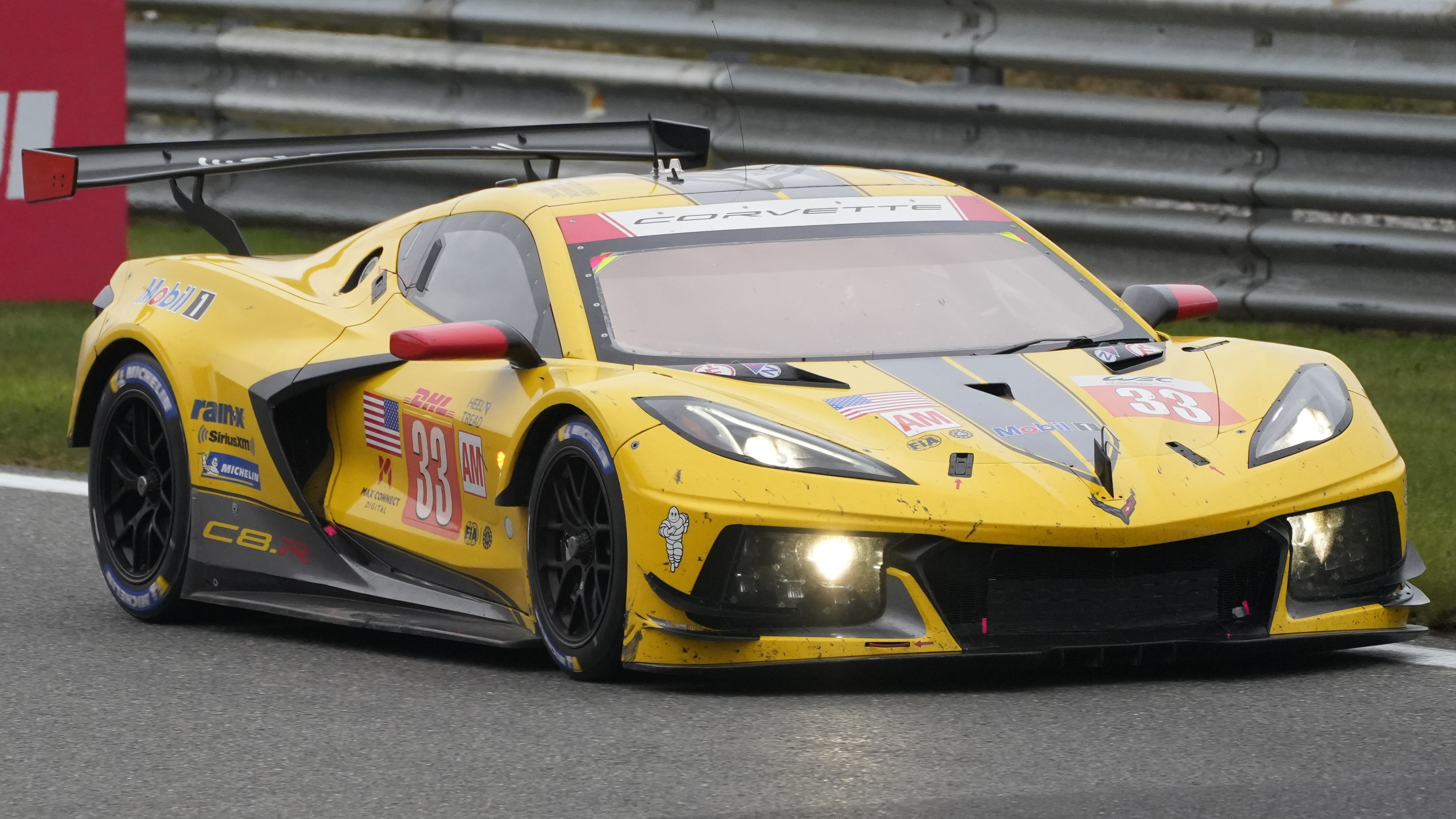
The Chevrolet Corvette C8.R at the 2023 6 Hours of Spa-Francorchamps.

The Chevrolet Corvette C8.R, was unveiled in 2019 alongside the C8 generation Corvette convertible model. Built to LM GTE regulations, the C8.R was the final Corvette built for racing under the General Motors and Pratt Miller partnership. It was also the first Corvette race car to use a flat-plane crank V8 and the first mid-engined Corvette built for GT racing. It completed its debut in the 2020 24 Hours of Daytona. The C8.R won a total of three Teams' and Drivers' championships each during its tenure. The C8.R was grandfathered for a season into IMSA GTD, the GT3 class of the IMSA SportsCar Championship, before finally being retired in 2024.

For the 2022 model year, Chevrolet offered a C8.R-inspired IMSA GTLM Special Edition package for the production Corvette Stingray.

=== Indianapolis 500 pace cars ===
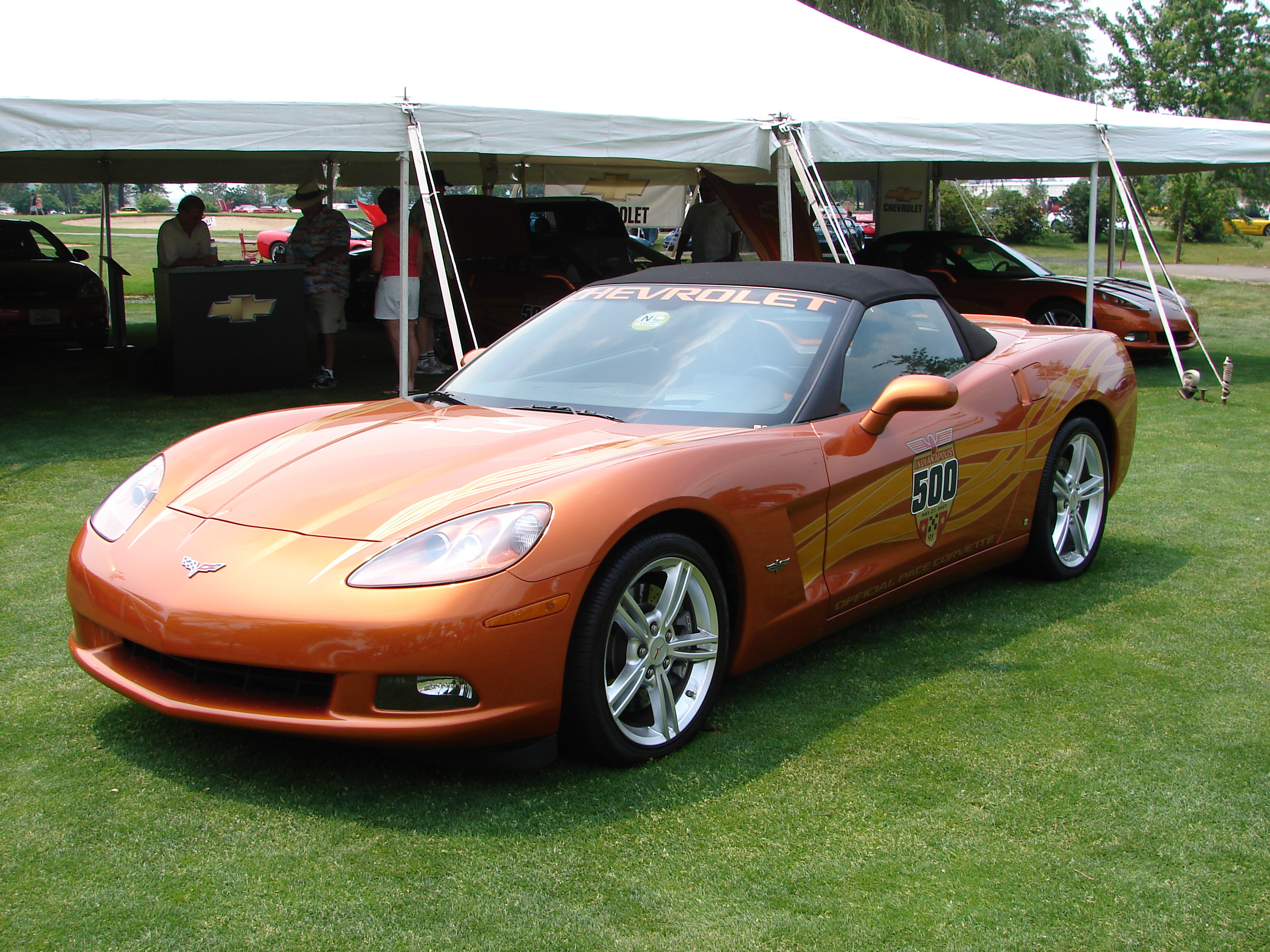
2007 Corvette Indy 500 Pace Car

The Indianapolis 500 race has used a Corvette as its pace car 18 times. The 2008 running of the Indy 500 represented a record fifth-consecutive year to lead the field until 2009 when the Chevrolet Camaro SS was selected. The Corvette's pace car years and details include:

- 1978 – Driven by 1960 race winner Jim Rathmann; Chevrolet produced 6,502 production replicas.
- 1986 – Driven by famed pilot Chuck Yeager; all 7,315 production convertibles were considered pace car convertibles and included official graphics (to be installed at the owner's discretion).
- 1995 – Driven by then-Chevrolet General Manager Jim Perkins; 527 production replicas were produced.
- 1998 – Driven by 1963 race winner Parnelli Jones after an injury prevented golfer Greg Norman from performing the duty; 1,158 replicas were produced.
- 2002 – Driven by actor Jim Caviezel; no replicas were produced, but graphics were available by special order. About 300 sets sold.
- 2004 – Driven by actor Morgan Freeman; no production replicas produced.
- 2005 – Driven by General Colin Powell; no production replicas produced.
- 2006 – Driven by cycling champion Lance Armstrong; first Corvette Z06 pace car; no production replicas produced.
- 2007 – Driven by actor Patrick Dempsey; 500 production replicas – all convertibles.
- 2008 – Driven by race winner Emerson Fittipaldi; 500 production replicas – coupes and convertibles.
- 2012 – Driven by television presenter Guy Fieri; first Corvette C6 ZR1 pace car; no production replicas produced.
- 2013 – Driven by former Indianapolis Colts football player Jim Harbaugh; first year of production for the C7 generation.
- 2015 – Driven by Brickyard 400 winner Jeff Gordon; first Chevrolet Corvette C7 Z06 pace car
- 2017 – Driven by actor Jeffrey Dean Morgan; 2017 Grand Sport Convertible
- 2018 - Driven by Indiana Pacers basketball player Victor Oladipo. Chevrolet Corvette C7 ZR1; no production replicas produced.
- 2019 - Driven by former NASCAR driver and NBC Sports broadcaster Dale Earnhardt Jr. Last year of production for C7 generation; no production replicas produced.
- 2020 - Driven by GM President Mark Reuss. 2020 Corvette C8 Stingray Torch Red Coupe. No replicas were produced.
- 2021 - Driven by former IndyCar driver Danica Patrick. 2021 Corvette C8 Stingray Arctic White Hardtop.
- 2022 - Driven by former IndyCar driver Sarah Fisher. 2023 Corvette C8 Z06 70th Anniversary Edition Z06.
- 2023 - Driven by Indiana Pacers basketball player Tyrese Haliburton. 2023 Corvette C8 Z06 Hardtop.

== See also ==
- Chevrolet Engineering Research Vehicle
- Kaiser Darrin, prototype in 1952, 435 built for the 1954 model year
- Nash-Healey, 1951–1954
- National Corvette Museum
- VH1, Corvette Give-away Sweepstakes
- CorvetteForum, Corvette enthusiasts' club

== Further media ==
Videos

- "Why Chevy Is Radically Changing The Corvette". CNBC. September 11, 2019. Archived from the original on October 30, 2021.
