= Chevrolet Corvair Monza GT =

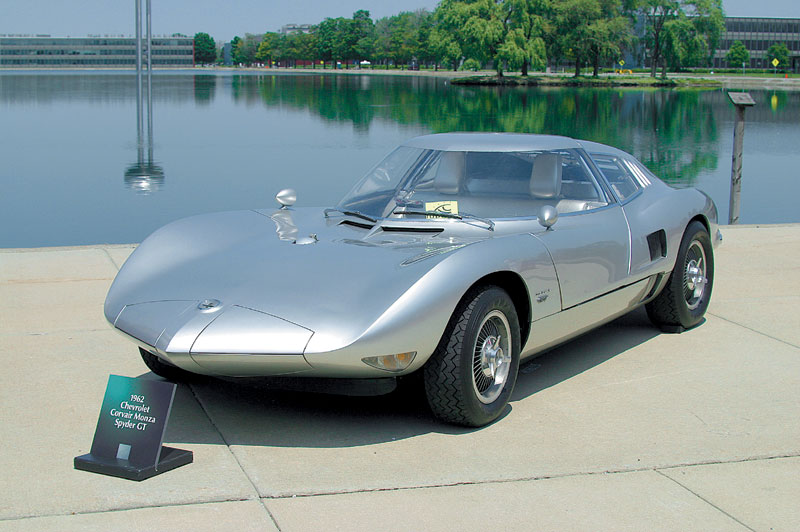
- Corvair Monza GT at General Motors Technical Center in Warren, MI

Overview
- Manufacturer: Chevrolet (General Motors)
- Also called: XP-777; Monza GT
- Production: 1962; 1 built
- Designer: Larry Shinoda, Anatole Lapine

Body and chassis
- Class: Sports car (experimental)
- Body style: Coupe
- Layout: RMR layout
- Doors: 1 (hinged canopy)
- Related: Chevrolet Corvair; Monza SS Spyder

Powertrain
- Engine: 145 cu in (2.4 L) Chevrolet Turbo-Air 6 engine H6
- Power output: 102 hp (76 kW)
- Transmission: 4-speed manual

Dimensions
- Wheelbase: 92 in (2,337 mm)
- Length: 165 in (4,191 mm)
- Width: 62 in (1,575 mm)
- Height: 41 in (1,041 mm)

The Chevrolet Corvair Monza GT (XP-777) is an experimental mid-engined prototype automobile built by General Motors in 1962. Based on the early model Chevrolet Corvair series, it remained a concept car, and did not enter production.

== Design and development ==
In response to consumer advocate Ralph Nader's Unsafe at Any Speed, Chevrolet began developing a front-engine, front-wheel drive version of the Corvair; GM design chief Bill Mitchell repurposed a 1962 design project by moving the transaxle to the rear, resulting in a mid-engine Corvair derivative. Under Mitchell's direction, the Corvair Monza GT coupe had been designed by Larry Shinoda and Tony Lapine, borrowing from the Bertone-designed Testudo concept car. Like the earlier design, the interior was accessed through a front-hinged canopy that extended into the B section; the rear engine cover also hinged at the rear. The engine was a standard 145 cu in (2.4 L), 102 hp (76 kW), Chevrolet Turbo-Air 6 engine with two carburetors. Unlike the production rear-engine Corvair, the GT engine was mounted ahead of the transaxle, resulting in a mid-engine layout. The chassis, designed by a team led by Frank Winchell, featured a 92 in (234 cm) wheelbase, 16 in (41 cm) shorter than the production Corvair. The overall dimensions were similarly reduced with a length of 165 in (419.1 cm) and a height of 41 in (104 cm).

Besides its streamlined appearance, the Monza GT had innovative features, including magnesium-alloy wheels, 4-wheel disc brakes, 4-wand fixed seats with adjustable pedals. These features would appear in production cars years later.

== History ==
Introduced to the public in June 1962 at Elkhart Lake at a Sports Car Club of America race for A- and B-production classes, the Corvair Monza GT was an instant hit with enthusiasts. Reporters called the car "gorgeous."

In early 1963, the Chevrolet Corvair Monza GT coupe toured together with the related Monza SS (Super Spyder, XP-797), styled as a roofless version of the GT, making another public appearance at the New York International Auto Show. Although both cars were based on existing Corvair drivetrain components and resembled each other externally, each represented a separate development of the Corvair design. In the Monza SS, the six-cylinder/six-carburetor engine was left in its stock location behind the transaxle, allowing a shorter 88 in-long (2,235 mm) wheelbase. Like the XP-777/Monza GT, the XP-797/Monza SS chassis was developed by Winchell's team and the body was styled by Mitchell's Studio X team (Shinoda and Lapine).

Both the Monza GT and SS ended up as concepts only, tied partly to the fortunes of the Corvair, which suffered after the vehicle was declared unsafe by Nader. Mitchell remarked in 1985 that he "wanted something more exotic, so I built the one where the hatch came up (the Monza GT) and it's still a beautiful car, but it was heavy. Then I built the open job (the Monza SS). GM just couldn't see putting that out, but it went around to shows everywhere." Chevrolet began developing the Monza GT/SS into a production car under XP-782 with a targeted release year of 1966, but the production version never came to fruition.

The Corvair Monza GT concept car is one of more than 700 vehicles found in the GM Heritage Collection of historically significant vehicles.

=== Influence and legacy ===
The cars used for the World of Tomorrow car ride attraction at Disneyland were based on the styling of the Corvair Monza GT.

The 1963 Corvette GS-II was derived from the mid-engine chassis of the Monza GT, again by Winchell's team. The GS referred to the Zora Arkus-Duntov-led Corvette Grand Sport program of 1962; two examples were built: GS-IIa, which was powered by a 327-cu.in. V8, and GS-IIb, which used a lightweight chassis and reportedly achieved 198 mph (319 km/h) at Jim Hall's Rattlesnake Raceway test track. The GS-II was styled again by Larry Shinoda. Hall's Chaparral 2C race car was in turn derived from the GS-IIb, which remained in Midland, Texas, mostly forgotten until it was subsequently put on display starting from 2018 at the Chaparral wing of the Permian Basin Petroleum Museum.

Some of the styling features of the GT, notably the rear end, were the inspiration for the 1965–1969 Corvair. According to Pontiac Motor Division engineer Bill Collins, the division borrowed heavily from the Corvair Monza GT design when it developed both the coupe and convertible versions of its 1964 Banshee prototype cars. The design would also influence the 1965 Chevrolet Mako Shark II concept car and the 1965 Experimental Opel GT. Those prototypes evolving into the production 1969-1973 Opel GT the 1968–1982 Corvette (C3) models
