= General Motors XP-819 =

Overview
- Manufacturer: General Motors
- Production: 1965
- Designer: Larry Shinoda

Body and chassis
- Related: Chevrolet Corvette

The XP-819 was a one-off concept car, developed by General Motors in 1965, to test a rear engine configuration for the Chevrolet Corvette.

== Design ==
The body was designed by Larry Shinoda, designer of the 1963 Sting Ray Split Window Coupe and the CERV-1. There are styling cues in XP-819 that later appeared in Shinoda's famed 1968 "Sting Ray" design. A reverse rotation General Motors marine engine was factory-installed in the car, so the two-speed transaxle would operate properly. The entire chassis, suspension, and steering are custom made components unique to this car. Some of these parts also found their way to later production cars.

== History ==
After one of the testing engineers had an accident testing the car, the XP-819 was slated for demolition. However, racer and performance driver Smokey Yunick requested this car as the basis for a new race car design. Smokey never completed the racer and later sold the XP-819 to Steve Tate, a General Motors dealer from Gallatin, Missouri.

When purchased, the car had been cut into several pieces and was almost unidentifiable. Had Tate not spotted the "XP" designation on the windshield Vehicle Identification Number, the car might never have been seen again.

On August 17, 2002, Mid America Motorworks in Effingham, Illinois, added the XP–819 to the "MY Garage Collection". It is undergoing a complete restoration at the Mid America Motorworks’ Installation & Restyling Center, with an estimated completion date sometime in 2014.
