= Anatole Lapine =

Latvian auto designer known for his Porsche work

Anatole Carl Lapine
- Born: Anatole Carl Lapine; May 23, 1930; Riga, Latvia
- Died: April 29, 2012 (aged 81); Baden-Baden, Germany
- Occupation: Automobile designer

Anatole Carl "Tony" Lapine (born 23 May 1930 in Riga, Latvia, died 29 April 2012 in Baden-Baden, Germany) was an automotive designer and racing driver. Lapine worked for General Motors (GM), Opel, and Porsche. During his time as chief designer at Porsche he oversaw development of the front-engined, water-cooled 928, 924 and 944 that began to appear in the mid to late 1970s, as well as two revisions to the Porsche 911.

== Biography ==
=== Early years ===
Lapine was born and grew up Riga, Latvia. During WWII, his family fled Latvia, first to Poznań, Poland in 1941, then to a village near Hamburg, Germany in 1944. In 1950 he apprenticed at Daimler-Benz in Hamburg and subsequently studied at the Hamburg Wagenbauschule (Hamburg College of Motor Vehicle Studies).

In 1951 the family relocated to the US, settling in Lincoln, Nebraska, where Lapine earned a living repairing locomotives and trains. Shortly after this Lapine moved to Detroit, Michigan looking for work.

=== General Motors ===
==== Fisher Body ====
In 1951 Lapine began his professional career at GM. He had applied for a job at GM Research, but reported to the wrong location and soon found himself working in the body development department at Fisher Body due to his experience with Daimler-Benz. His first job at GM was creation of a seating buck for the 1954 Cadillac.

==== Studio X ====
In the mid-1950s, at the instigation of Harley Earl and the direction of Clare MacKichan, Lapine followed Robert Cumberford to "Studio X", Bill Mitchell's clandestine design studio. One of Lapine's first projects at Studio X was the design of the Corvette SS, working with Cumberford and Zora Arkus-Duntov.

The Corvette SS mule was later bought by Mitchell, who planned to use it as a basis for project XP-87, which later evolved into the 1959 Stingray racer. Lapine worked on the Stingray racer with Larry Shinoda.

At roughly the same time as the XP-87/Stingray racer was taking shape, Ed Cole was promoting an idea for a future GM car platform called the Q-Chevrolet. The defining feature was to be a front-mounted engine with a rear-mounted transaxle, a configuration that would figure prominently in some of Lapine's later projects. A design for a Q-Corvette was drawn up, with hopes that it would become a reality, but the project foundered.

After the Stingray racer, Lapine served as studio engineer for the 1963 Corvette Sting Ray production model. He also contributed to several concept cars and projects, including both the Chevrolet Corvair Monza GT and Corvair Monza SS cars, working again with Shinoda, and the CERV I and CERV II prototypes with both Shinoda and Arkus-Duntov.

During this time Lapine met Wolfgang Möbius, a designer on a temporary assignment to the United States from GM's German subsidiary Opel.

Lapine also met GM designer Jeanette Lea Krebs. The couple married in 1957, and went on to have three children; Klaus, Hans and Inge.

==== Opel ====
On 10 March 1962 MacKichan was transferred to Opel for a five-year term. In 1965 Lapine was also transferred to Opel to oversee the Research Center at Rüsselsheim am Main. It was here that he established a secret "skunkworks" studio of his own, and built a variety of experimental cars using Opel parts.

Lapine led the secret development of a racing version of the Opel Rekord C, which became known as the "Black Widow" and was raced by Erich Bitter and Niki Lauda. The car was originally called "the Taxi" because Lapine had put a taxi sign on the roof of the car. Shortly before his death, he helped construct a replica of the original car.

Lapine also contributed to the final shape of the Opel GT.

On one occasion, members of the Porsche and Piëch families were invited to visit Opel. Porsche was interested in observing the GM subsidiary's interplay between styling and engineering, and in seeing Opel's Design Center, which corresponded to Porsche's Weissach facility under construction at the time. Lapine was a part of the tour, and weeks after the visit was offered a position with Porsche.

=== Porsche ===
==== Road cars ====
On 15 April 1969, Lapine became chief designer at Porsche. Accompanying Lapine in moving from Opel to Porsche were Wolfgang Möbius, Dick Soderberg, and chief modeler Peter Reisinger.

One of Lapine's first major projects to reach production at Porsche was a redesign of the iconic Porsche 911, even though Lapine was not necessarily a fan of the model. His redesign resulted in the 1974 G-series 911. Challenged by new safety legislation in the US, Lapine incorporated the bumpers behind distinctive accordion/bellows covers and refreshed the shape with a trend setting black-on-body-color trim style.

Facing the possibility that future American legislation would spell the end of the 911 in that market, Lapine headed up the project he is most closely associated with; the Porsche 928. Möbius served as the 928's principal designer, and Lapine oversaw and guided the car's development.

The 928 was Porsche's interpretation of an American performance car, and drew on Lapine's experience at GM. The 928 has, in fact, been called the "German Corvette". More than one comparison has been made between the 928 and Lapine's work on the C2 Corvette and the earlier Corvette specials. Apart from his history at GM, Lapine revealed that the shape of the 928 had been influenced by the Chevrolet Testudo, designed by Giorgetto Giugiaro while at Bertone.

Two other "transaxle cars" were also developed under Lapine's aegis. The Porsche 924 began life as project EA425 for Volkswagen, and was drawn by designer Harm Lagaay. Development started after the 928, but was accelerated by VW as the paying customer so that the car reached the market in 1976, one year before the 928. The 1982 Porsche 944 was developed from the 924.

The Gruppe B prototype that appeared at the September 1983 Frankfurt Auto Show was designed under Lapine's oversight. Dick Soderberg produced the shape. The body's shape was used for the Porsche 959.

Helmuth Bott, Porsche's Executive Vice-president for Research and Development, built a one-off tribute to the 1955 Porsche Speedster of his own in 1983. By 1986 he had gotten Peter Schutz's approval for a factory version with modern mechanicals, with Lapine doing the design. The 911 Speedster went into limited production in 1989.

The last project overseen by Lapine was the Type 964, released in 1989. The 964 was instantly recognizable as the next model in the 911 lineage, even though every single panel of the car had been redesigned.

==== Race cars ====
Lapine designed the body for the Porsche 917 PA Spyder.

He also created several memorable paint treatments for some of Porsche's racing cars. For the 1970 24 Hours of Le Mans Lapine treated Porsche 917–043 to a bright, flowing, "psychedelic" paint job that earned the car the nickname of the "Hippie" Porsche. The colors were selected by Lapine to represent the irises that were his favorite. 1500 spray cans were used to create the finished look. Another "Hippie" Porsche was a 917K, serial number 917-021.

For the trio of 908/3 cars fielded alongside the 917s at the 1971 Targa Florio, Lapine used sponsor Gulf Oil's traditional colors; a sky blue body and orange stripes, but changed the standard stripes into arrows, and added playing card suit symbols on the right front corner of each car.

Another car that received a unique paint scheme from Lapine was 917–20. The car had bodywork developed by French firm SERA, who produced a car body with larger radius curves that someone remarked looked like a pig. Lapine painted the car pink, and added dotted lines with names of cuts of pork, giving the car the appearance of a butcher's diagram. The car was nicknamed "Die Sau" (German for "The Sow"), and the "Pink Pig". It raced at Le Mans in 1971.

==== Other projects ====
Lapine was involved in many projects for companies that had come to Porsche for engineering expertise, including some projects unrelated to automobiles.

He was part of a team that consulted on a project in Russia that eventually went to Fiat, and became the VAZ Zhiguli, called the Lada in export markets.

Lapine also worked on a project to redesign the cockpit of the Airbus A310 aircraft. The company had eliminated the flight engineer's station to free up more space in the fuselage for additional passenger seating. The Porsche team redesigned the controls to allow a two-person crew to handle all functions previously done by three. Another of Lapine's aviation projects was development of a helicopter airframe for Wagner. He also designed a forklift for Linde.

To keep his design office busy, Lapine at times intercepted communications meant for other departments, taking those jobs for his own team.

Lapine built a very special MG TC as a personal project. The car used the original MG chassis, with new reproduction aluminum body panels, but with a DOHC inline-4 engine and 5-speed manual transmission from Fiat, a rear axle from an Alfa Romeo, and the same pedals and titanium steering rack used in the Porsche 917.

=== Later years ===
Lapine suffered a heart attack in the late 1980s. He moved to Baden-Baden to recuperate, but eventually retired in 1989 rather than return to work. He was succeeded at Porsche by Harm Lagaay.

After his recovery Lapine taught classes at Vienna University. Using his knowledge of fluid dynamics he had an aluminum-hulled yacht built, which he and one of his sons sailed across the Atlantic Ocean. He also continued to pursue his interest in music, including the use of his personal professional Pearl drum kit.

Jeanette Lapine returned to the US, settling in Litchfield, Connecticut, where she died 6 July 2018.

== Motorsports ==
Lapine drove a variety of cars throughout his career as a racing driver, including his wife's new Jaguar XK120, which he totaled. He later raced Volvos, Volkswagen Beetles, a Triumph TR3, and an Alfa Romeo Giulietta.

Lapine was co-driver to Dick Thompson at the 1959 Road America 500 at Elkhart Lake, Wisconsin in Bill Mitchell's XP-87 Stingray Racer. The car retired after 67 laps.

== Testimonials ==
"Anatole Lapine shaped Porsche sports car design over more than two decades. As a designer he didn’t follow fashion but was forever setting new trends with his concepts." — Michael Mauer, Porsche AG Chief Designer, 2004–

"He is, of course, crazy. But that is my problem. One does not expect to ride a fine, spirited horse without some trouble. He is not your average citizen; he is one of the best and that will make anyone unusual." — Dr. Ernst Fuhrmann, Porsche AG Chairman, 1972–1980

== Gallery ==
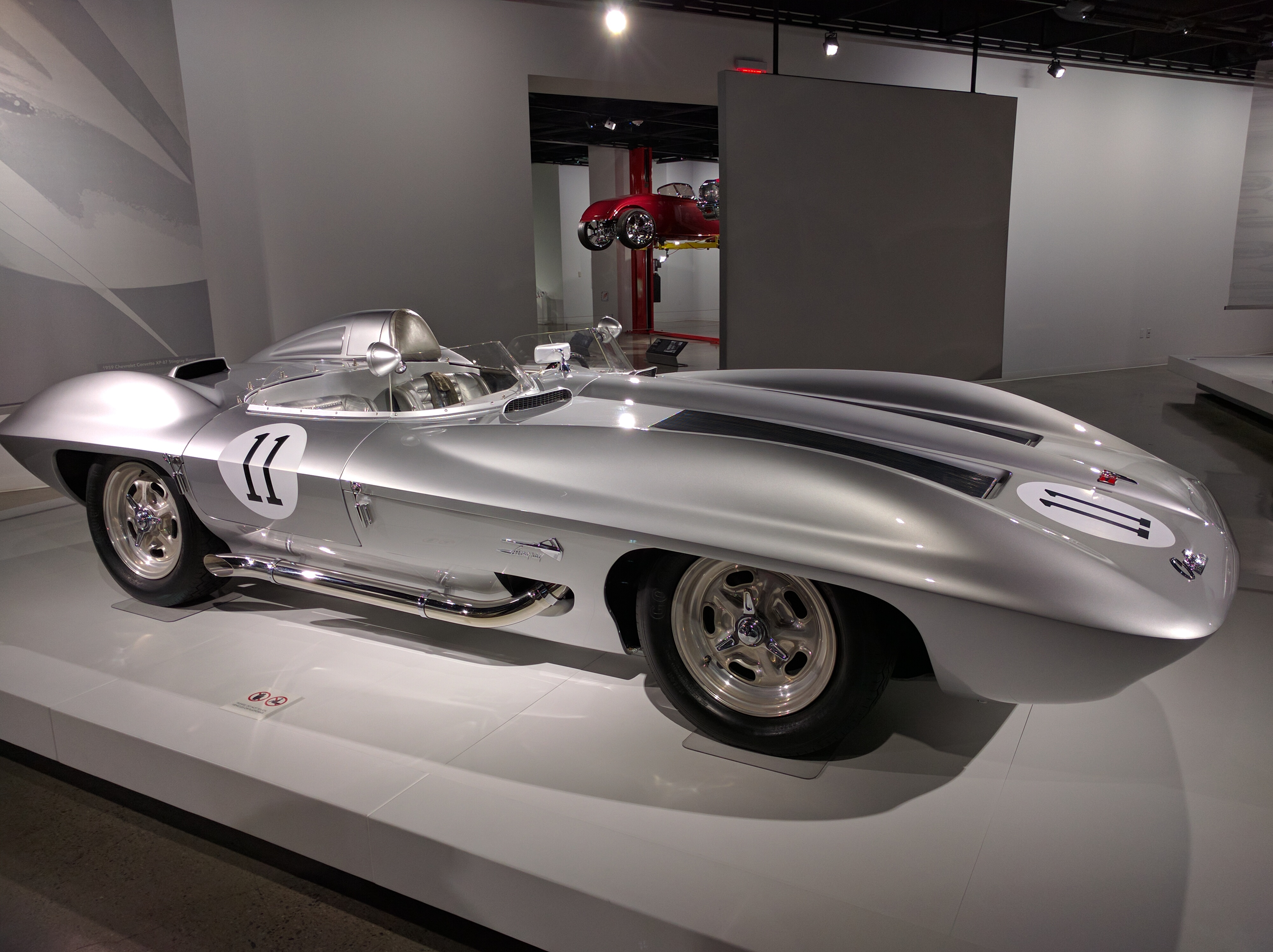
1959 Corvette XP-87 Stingray

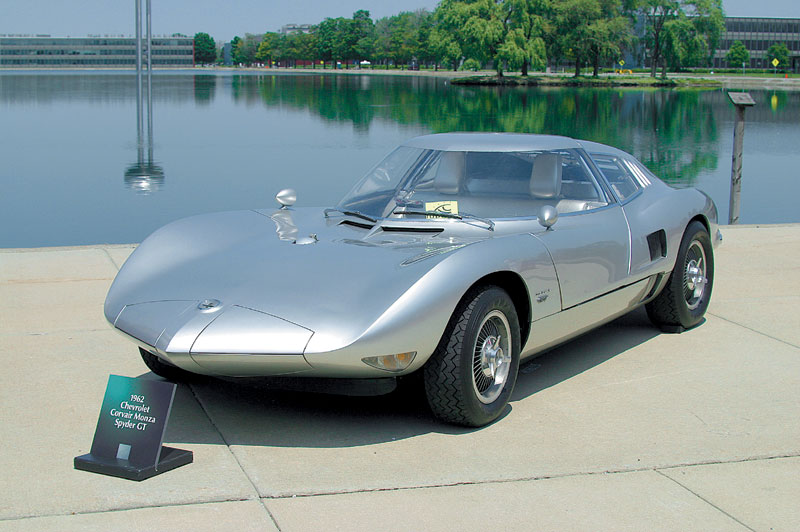
Corvair Monza GT

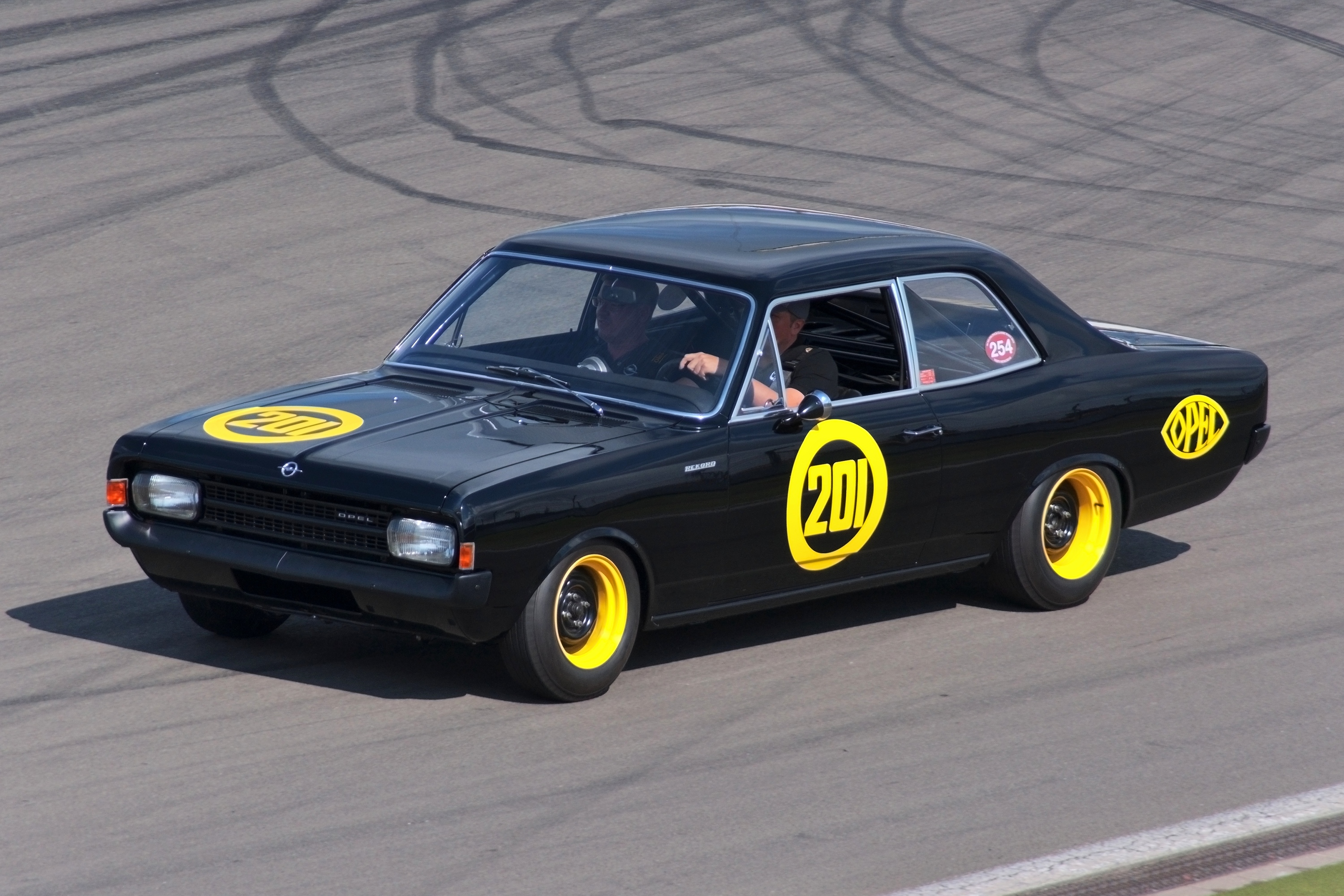
Opel Rekord C Black Widow replica

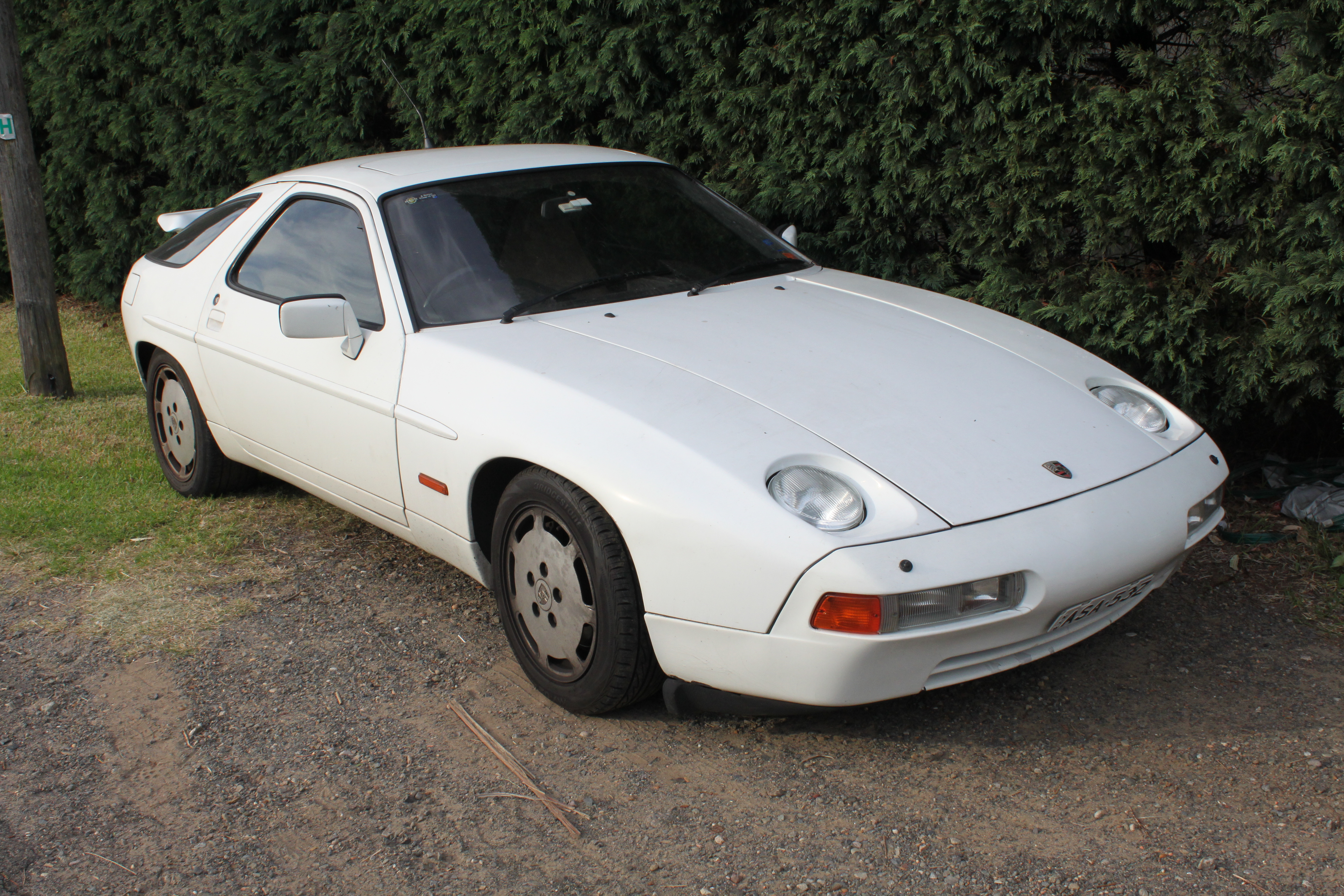
Porsche 928 S4

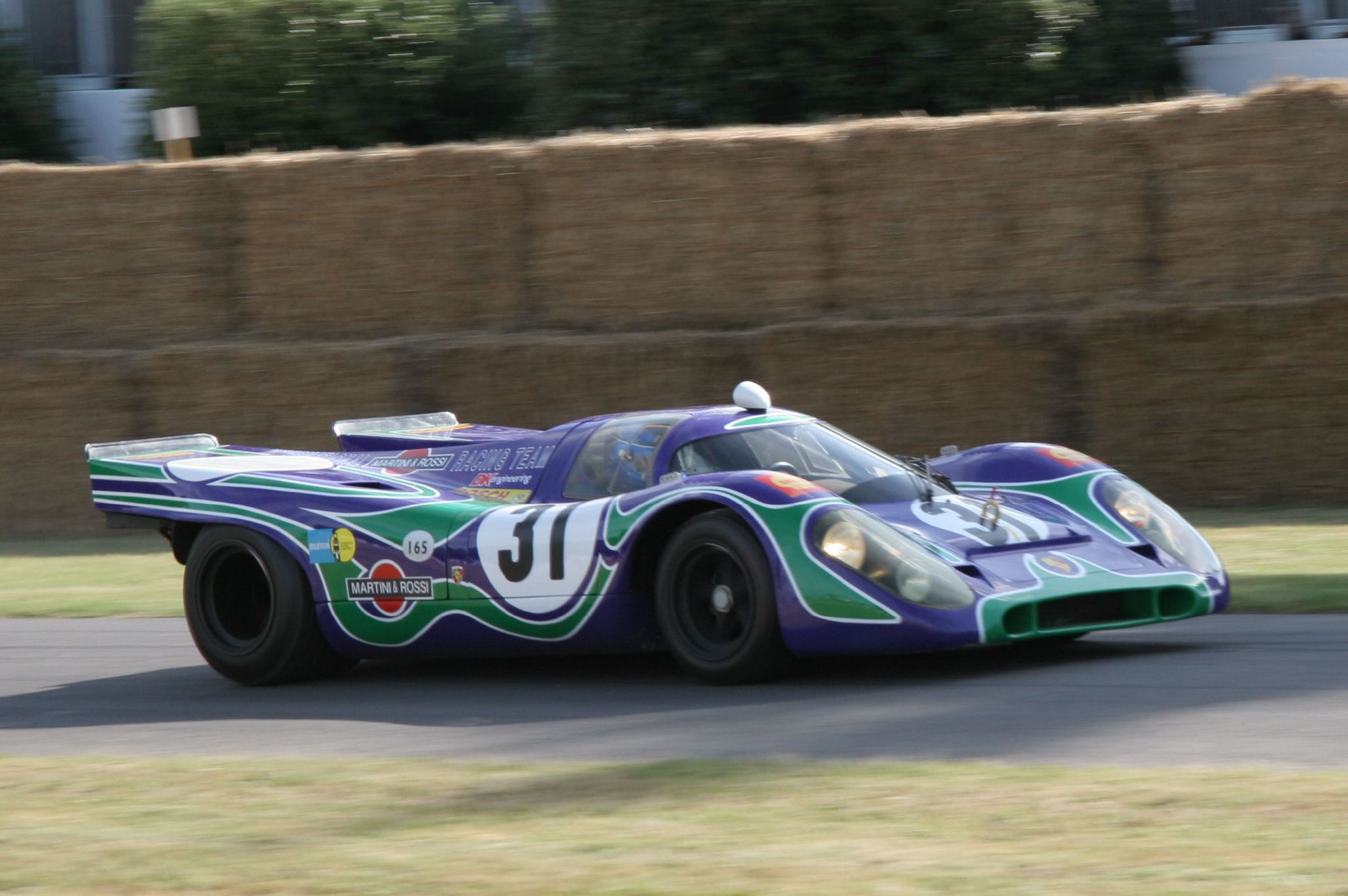
Porsche 917-021 "Hippie"

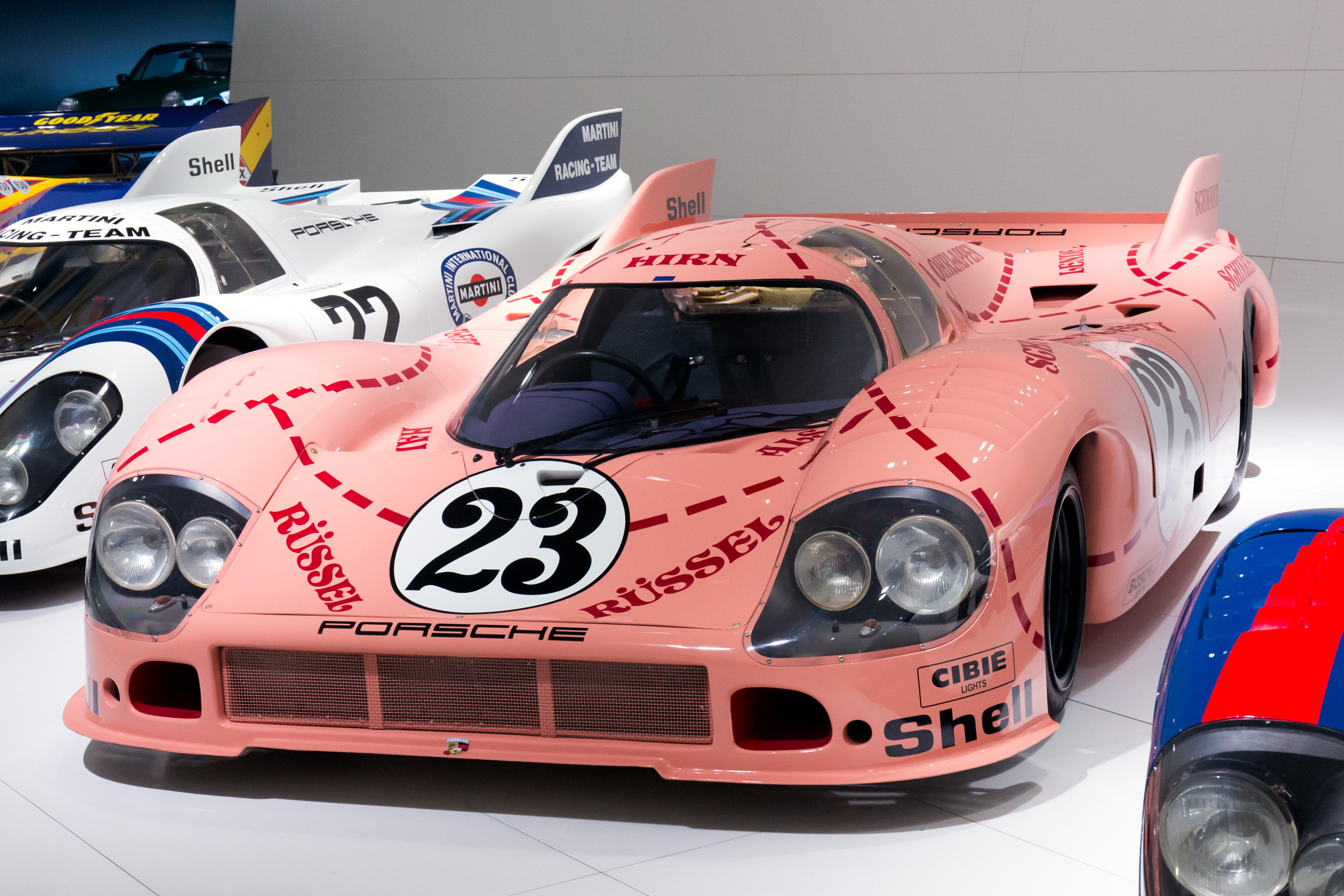
Porsche 917-20 "Pink Pig"
