= Chevrolet Astro I =

Chevrolet Astro I (1967)

Overview
- Manufacturer: General Motors
- Designer: Roy Vernon Lonberger

Body and chassis
- Class: Sports car
- Body style: 2-door coupe

Chronology
- Successor: Chevrolet Astro II (1968)

The Chevrolet Astro I (XP-842) was a concept car created for 1967. The nose design of the Astro I was quite similar to the Mako Shark show car.

It was previously called X-1000 Corvair Super GT Low Roof Aerodynamic Coupe. It was designed at the secret Warehouse Studio, formally called Advanced-5, located off the grounds of the GM Tech Center across 12 Mile Road.
