= Larry Shinoda =

American automotive designer (1930–1997)

- Born: Kiyoshi Lawrence Shinoda; March 25, 1930; Los Angeles, California
- Died: November 13, 1997 (aged 67); Bloomfield Hills, Michigan
- Occupation: automotive designer
- Years active: 1955–97
- Notable work: Chevrolet Corvette (C2), Chevrolet Corvette (C3), Boss 302 Mustang

Lawrence Kiyoshi "Larry" Shinoda (25 March 1930 – 13 November 1997) was an American automotive designer best known for his work on the Chevrolet Corvette and Ford Mustang.

== Early life and internment ==
Shinoda was born in Los Angeles, California, to Issei parents who were both immigrants from Japan. Shinoda's father, Kiyoshi, arrived in the United States when he was 12 and graduated from UC Berkeley with a degree in electrical engineering. His mother, Hide Watanabe, was born in 1906 and emigrated to the United States with her parents when she was less than one year old. She graduated from Woodbury College. Both of his parents were members of the Union Church of Los Angeles, where they met and were married. Larry had a sister, Aiko (Grace), who was three years older than him and was also artistically inclined.

Shinoda grew up in Southern California, where he started developing his artistic talents in grade school. Kiyoshi died when Larry was 3. He was interned with his sister, mother, and maternal family (an uncle, two aunts and a grandmother) by the U.S. government during World War II under U.S. Executive Order 9066 into the Manzanar "War Relocation Camp" in California. According to his internee data file, he was in grade 7 and spoke English only when he entered Manzanar; he had never attended a Japanese language school.

At camp, he snuck past the barbed wire to play and fish. His first recorded functional design was a set of reclining back chairs for his mother and grandmother at the incarceration camp that attracted the admiration of other incarcerees. The family was released and moved to Grand Junction, Colorado, in spring 1944 to help out at a farm owned by his paternal grandfather; that side of the family had avoided incarceration by fleeing California.

Shinoda completed his high school education at Eagle Rock High School in Los Angeles. While working for Weiand, Shinoda earned an associate's degree from Pasadena City College; upon graduating, he enlisted with the Air National Guard and served for two years, sixteen months of which were spent in Korea. Upon his return, he attended the Art Center College of Design in Los Angeles before it moved to Pasadena, but made a "negotiated" exit before graduating; he had been told (mistakenly) that attendance was optional if he turned in the assignments.

== Career ==
As a young man in Los Angeles, Shinoda built hot rods and raced them on the streets. One of the first cars he built was "Chopsticks Special", a 1932 Ford deuce coupe equipped with a 298 flathead V8, which he acquired from a coworker at Weiand, Bob Lee. Shinoda sold the Deuce coupe in 1953 to Don Montgomery and built a 1929 Ford roadster. This coupe has since been identified and restored. His 1929 Ford, named "Chopsticks Special IV", was powered by a flathead V8 with Ardun OHV heads. Shinoda won the "A" Hot Roadster class at the first NHRA U.S. Nationals held in Great Bend, Kansas with Chopsticks Special IV in 1955. Shinoda sold the 1929 Ford as parts to his partner in the car, Jack Powers, in 1956.

=== General Motors ===
"[Mitchell] had a Pontiac with a supercharger on it, and he had been driving home from work one evening. At the time, I had this white '55 Ford that had a 352 Ford stock car racing engine in it that had been shipped to me by Bill Stropp. I installed the engine in it, along with all the other goodies, and I basically had a street-driven NASCAR stock car. Well, I pulled up next to Mitchell at a red light one evening, the light changed and Bill took off, smoking the tires. I waited until he hit second gear, and then I passed him in first. He turned off at the next light. Then he came into the Chevy studio and he's telling McKeegen, the boss, about this white Ford that blew his doors off; he said he thought it must have had a Cadillac engine in it. And McKeegen says, 'Hey, Larry - you have a white Ford, don't you?' and I answered, 'Yeah'. Mitchell wanted to see my car, so I brought it into the garage, and when I popped the hood open he just about had a heart attack."

— Larry Shinoda, Vette magazine interview (1997)

Shinoda met Ford vice president Gene Bordinat in late 1954 before his time at the Art Center was cut short after he "saw no value in watercolor and life drawing classes"; he then went to work for several different automobile manufacturers, first Ford Motor Company in 1955, negotiating with Ford to cover the cost of moving "Chopsticks Special IV" to Detroit, then briefly with Packard, and finally joining General Motors in September 1956. During his brief stint with Packard, Shinoda met and befriended John Z. DeLorean and designed the body and paint scheme for the 1956 Indianapolis 500-winning car campaigned by John Zink.

Initially, Shinoda was assigned a six-month orientation class after being hired at GM, but was pulled early and assigned to the Chevrolet studio after one of his designs attracted attention; there he was credited with designing sharper fins, including the manufacturing process, for the 1959 Impala. According to Shinoda, he was recruited for GM design chief Bill Mitchell's "special styling projects" Studio X after beating Mitchell in an impromptu drag race from a stoplight in 1958. For the rest of his twelve total years at GM, Shinoda primarily designed concept cars, including the Mako Shark show car and CERV I. Working with Mitchell and Corvette chief engineer Zora Arkus-Duntov, he refined the XP 819 and other concept cars that eventually translated into the original 1963 Corvette Sting Ray design. Shinoda also led design work on the revised 1968 version that borrowed heavily from his Mako Shark concept. He also participated in the 1965 redesign of the Chevrolet Corvair, giving that car its sleek "Coke bottle" shape.

=== Ford ===
"One of the first things I did on coming to Ford was straighten out the Boss 302. They were going to call it the SR2. They had all this chrome on it. They were going to hang big cladding on the side, big rocker moldings. It was going to be more garish than the Mach 1. They had a big grille across the back and a great big gas cap and fake cast exhaust outlets and big hood pins and a really big side scoop. I took all that off, went to the C-stripe decal and painted out the hood, did the rear spoiler and the window shades and front airdam."

— Larry Shinoda, Consumer Guide interview

In 1968, Henry Ford II hired former GM executive Bunkie Knudsen to be president of Ford. Knudsen recruited Shinoda to come to Ford in hopes of improving the styling and sales of Ford's lineup. Shinoda's first project at Ford was the Boss 302 Mustang high-performance homologation special. Shinoda is credited with taking the original design, then designated SR-2, and removing much of the chrome ornamentation. Reportedly, Shinoda chose the name "Boss" as a homage to Knudsen. He led the design that was used for the succeeding Mustang models for 1970-1973 as well, but after Knudsen was fired from Ford late in 1969, Shinoda was dismissed a few days later.

=== Freelance ===
After leaving Ford, Shinoda and Knudsen co-founded Rectrans in November 1970, which built recreational vehicles in Brighton, Michigan. Rectrans was working with fiberglass composites and monocoque chassis, techniques used by Shinoda to design the Rectrans Discoverer, one of three planned models (Discover, 25'; Discoverer 27'; unnamed, 22'). The Discoverer was based on the contemporaneous Dodge B-series chassis and sold for three model years (1971–73). White Motor Company acquired Rectrans in 1971 as a condition of naming Knudsen as its chairman; Shinoda followed him again and was named White's design vice president.

While working for Rectrans, Shinoda designed the "American Dragster" slingshot streamliner dragster. This car had a fully enclosed wedge-shaped body, with only the front wheels, fitted with lakester-style wheel discs (Moon discs), exposed. Little is known about the project; it is likely interest was sparked by Shinoda's pre- and post-WW2 experience racing roadsters in the Los Angeles area.

Shinoda later opened an independent design firm and did work for GM, Ford, and aftermarket companies. In 1985, he was competing with an American Motors Corporation (AMC) internal team, and two fellow contractors (Giorgetto Giugiaro and Alain Clénet) to style a vehicle under development, then known as the XJC. The automaker was exploring a follow-up to the very popular compact Cherokee (XJ) models. That vehicle later was released in 1992 as the Jeep Grand Cherokee (ZJ) after Chrysler purchased AMC and its designs in 1987. Shinoda's contract included styling four different versions of the XJC (a 4-door, 2-door, and two pickup trucks). According to Shinoda, AMC product design executives entered his rented design studio without him and said his "design was 'terrible, brutal'"; they ordered him to destroy the clay model and return AMC's wheels and tires. However, the next day, AMC sent a crew to the design studio to confiscate his drawings and wood templates, and Shinoda was later told privately that AMC would proceed with his design. Under the terms of the contract, Shinoda was to be paid $354,000, but AMC only paid $135,000. He was placed under a non-disclosure agreement and prohibited from speaking publicly about the contract for five years. Shinoda did not protest the theft of his design until 1992, when the Grand Cherokee made its debut at Cobo Hall. Shortly before he died in 1997, Chrysler, the successor of AMC, settled with Shinoda for more than $200,000.

Shinoda developed kidney problems starting in 1996, yet continued to be an active designer. Before a transplant surgery could take place, he died of heart failure on 13 November 1997 at his home in Bloomfield Hills, Michigan, aged 67. His daughter, Karen, formed Team Shinoda, a tuner and performance parts company.

== Designs ==
Notable designs by Larry Shinoda:

- 1959 Stingray Racer (XP-87, with Pete Brock and Bill Mitchell)
- 1960 CERV I
- 1962 Corvair Super Spyder (XP-785)
- 1962 Monza GT (XP-777)
- 1963 Monza SS (XP-797)
- 1963 Mako Shark I (XP-755)
- 1963–67 Chevrolet Corvette (C2)
- 1964 CERV II
- 1965 Mako Shark II (XP-830)
- 1965 Chaparral 2C
- 1967/68 Chevrolet Astro I (XP-842), II (XP-880)
- 1968–82 Chevrolet Corvette (C3)
- 1969/70 Boss 302 Mustang
- 1970 Ford Torino King Cobra
- 1990 Rick Mears Special Edition Corvette
- 1993 Jeep Grand Cherokee (ZJ)
- National Corvette Museum logo
Notable designs by Larry Shinoda

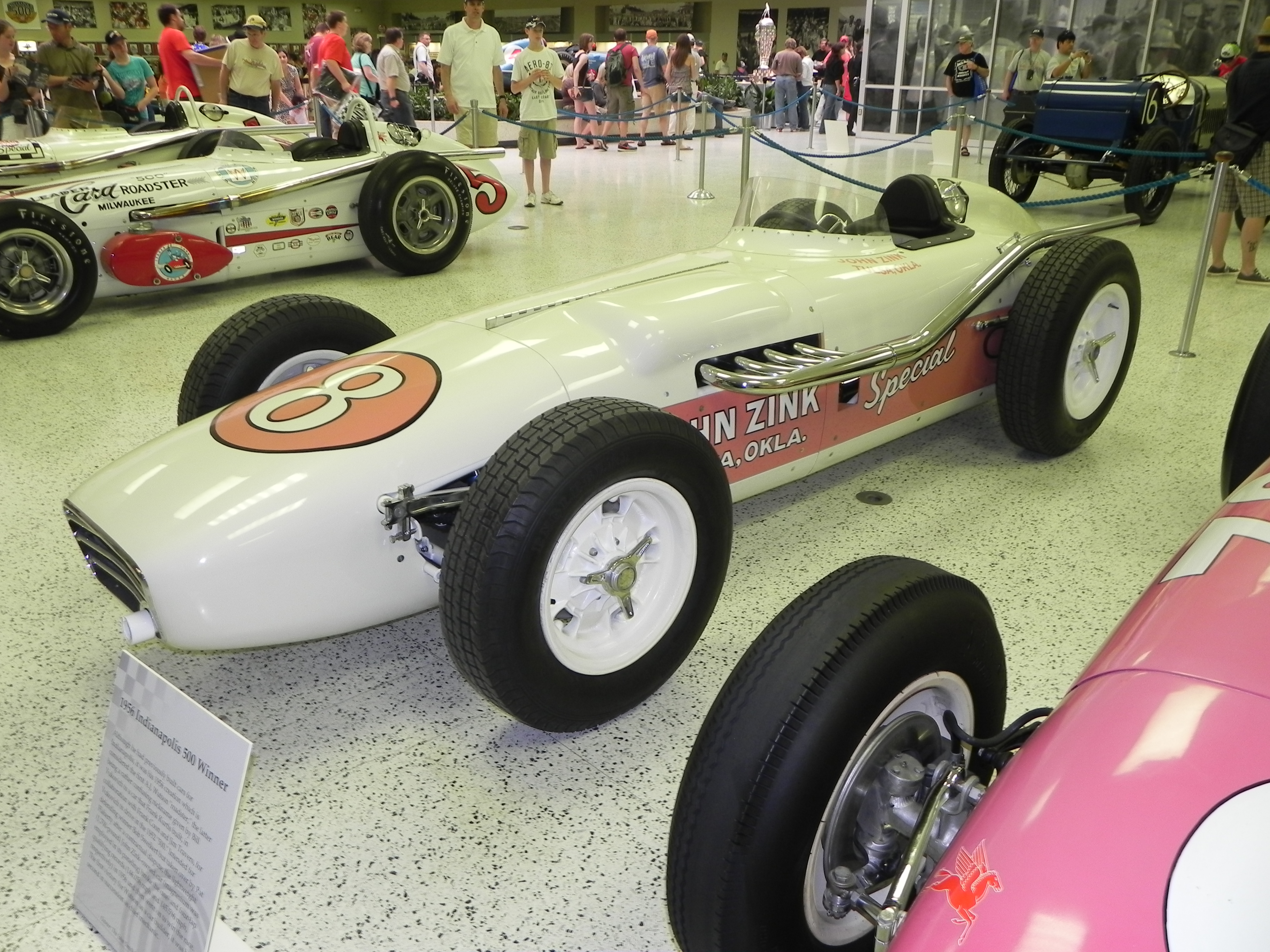
1956 Indianapolis 500 winner (Watson-Offenhauser) campaigned by John Zink

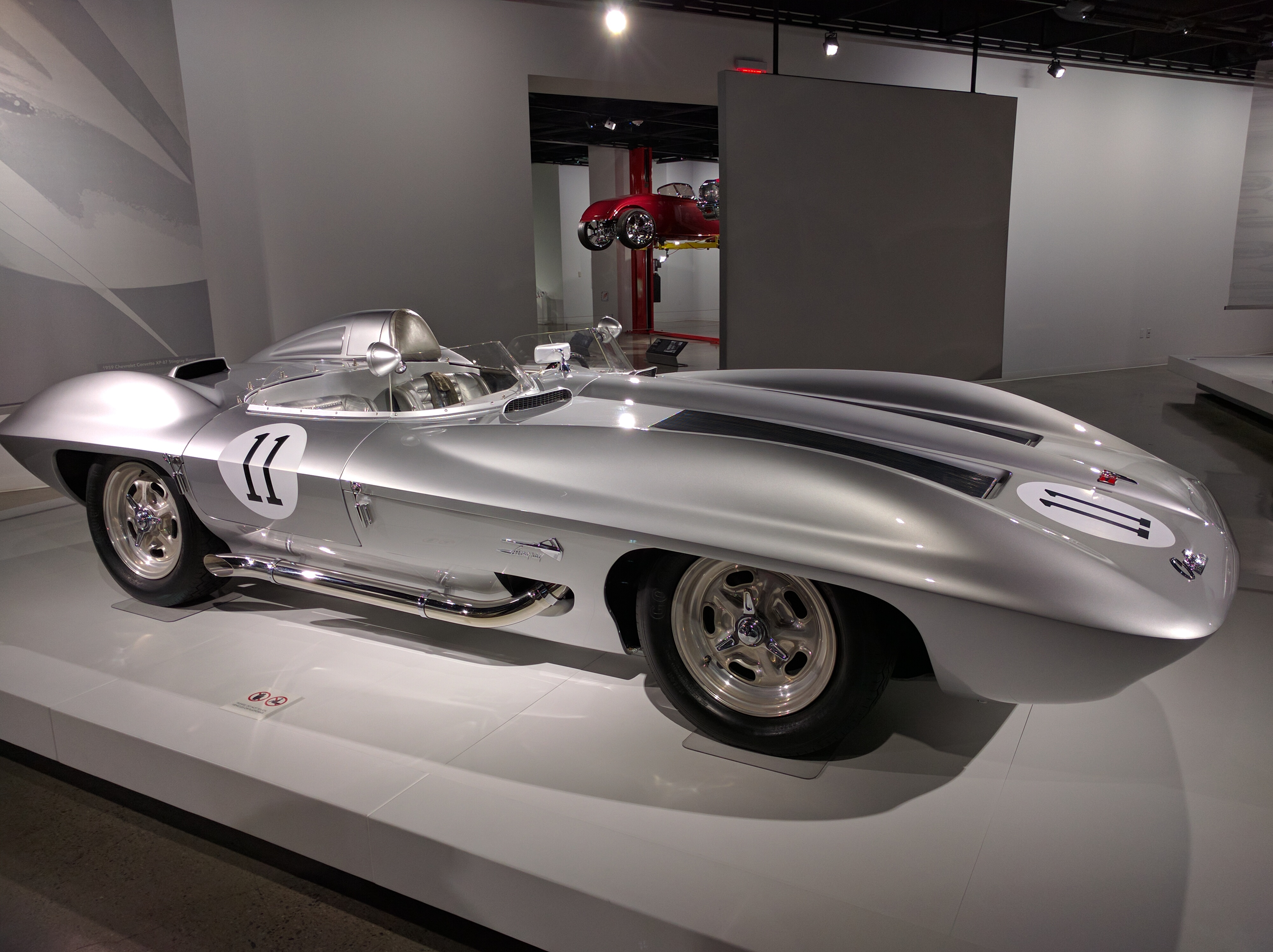
1959 Stingray Racer (Brock/Shinoda/Mitchell)

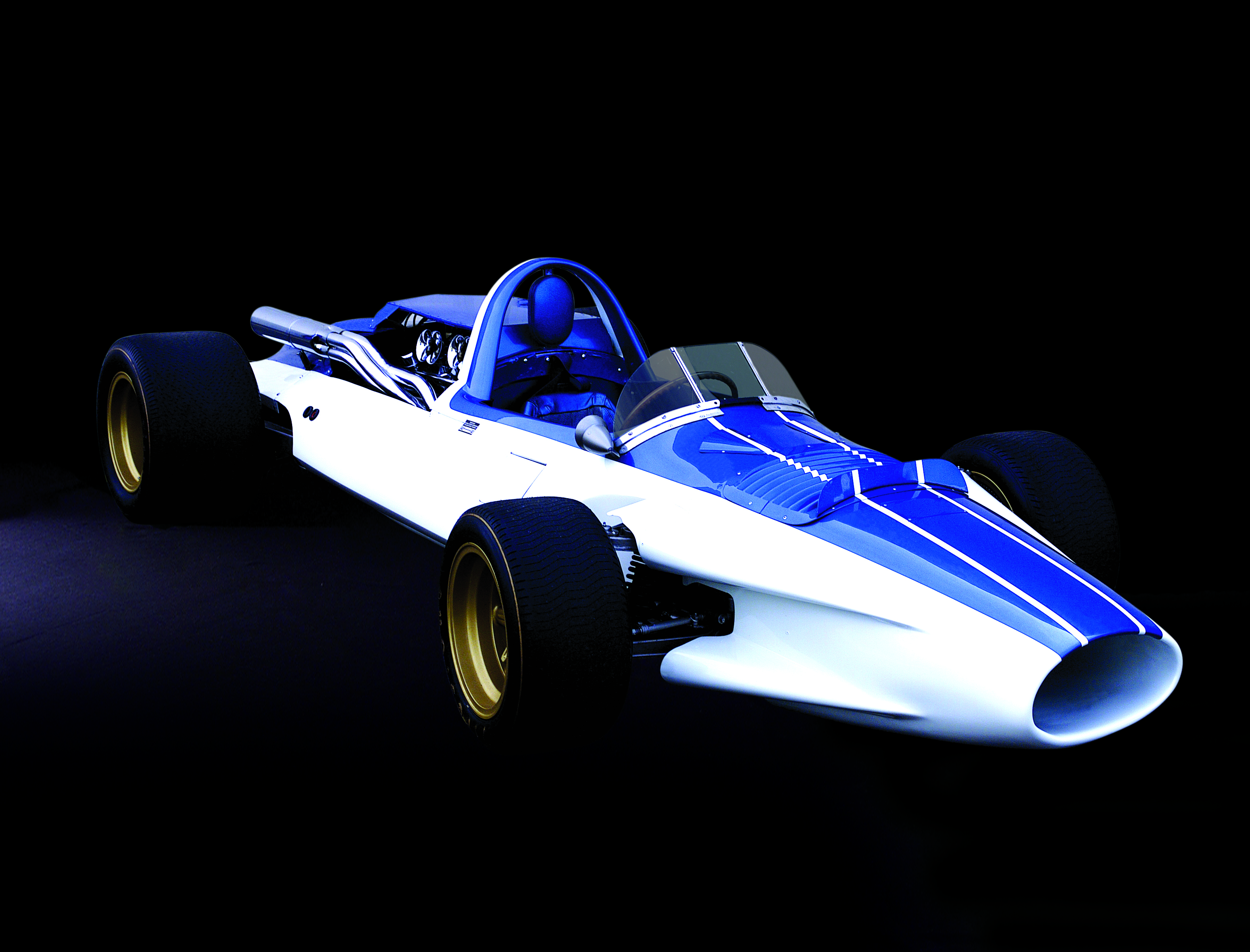
1960 CERV I concept

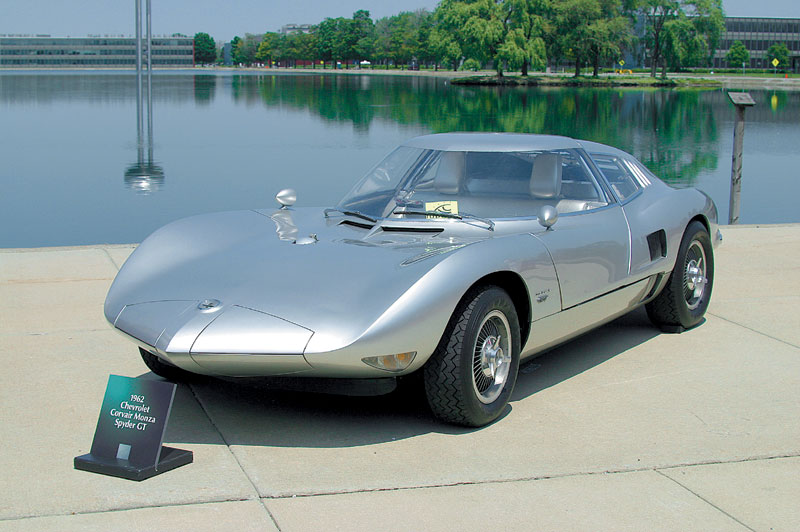
1962 Monza GT concept

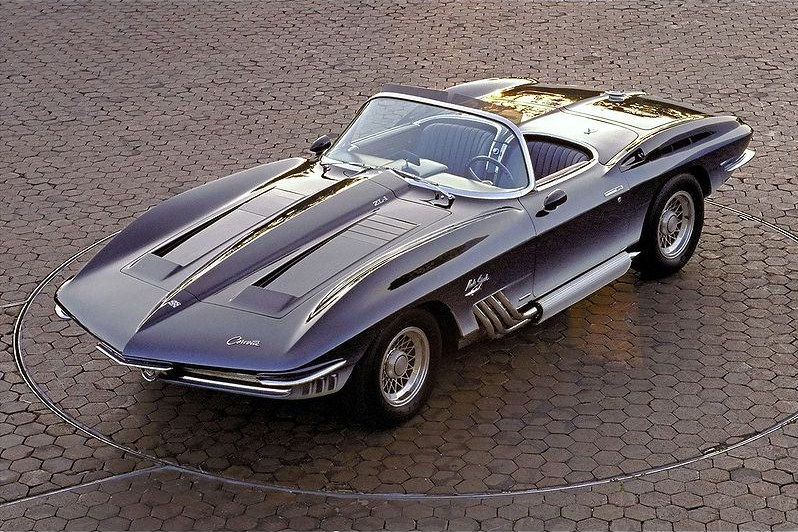
1963 Mako Shark I concept

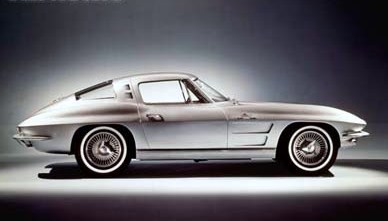
1963 Corvette Sting Ray Coupe

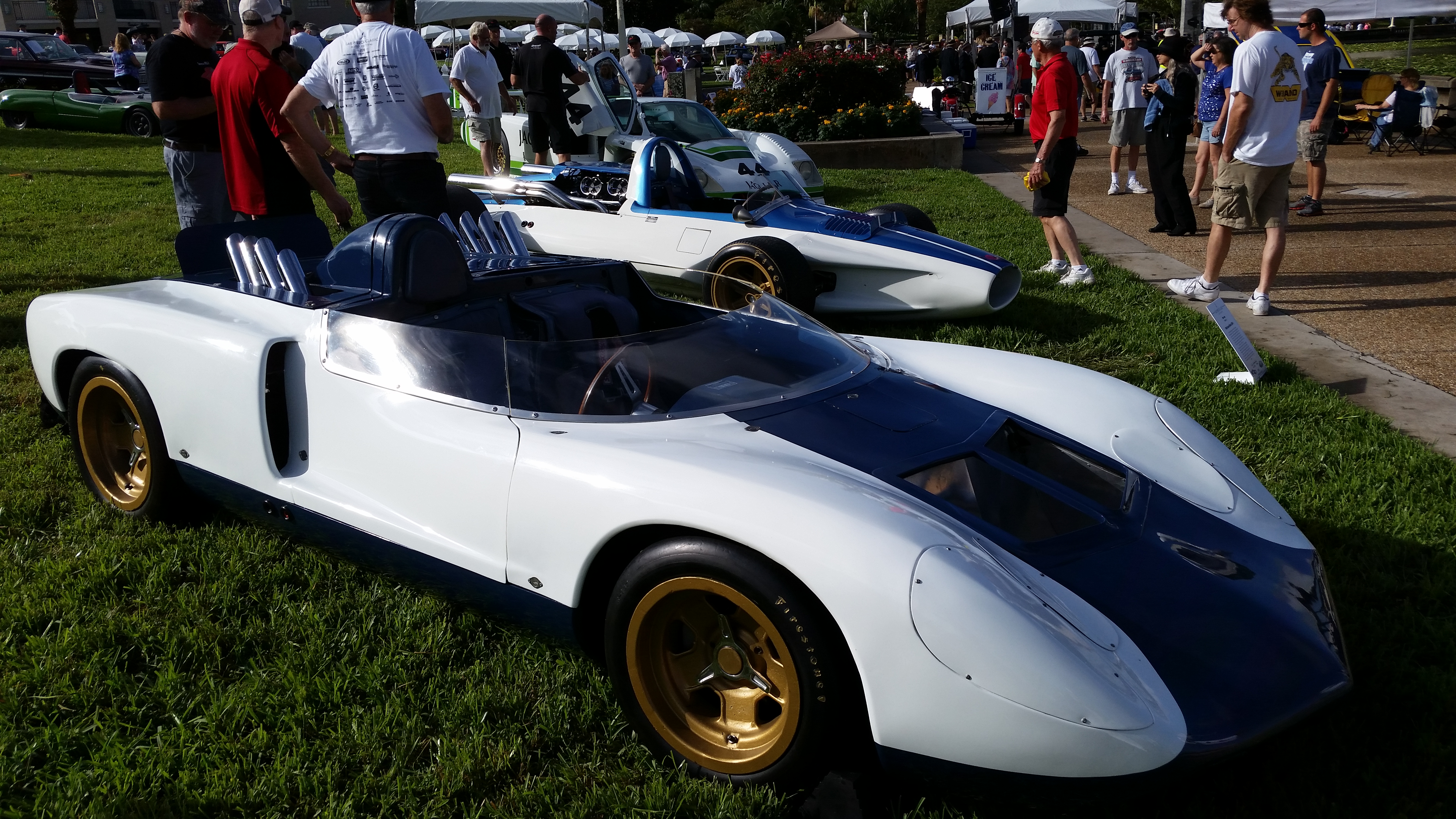
1964 CERV II concept

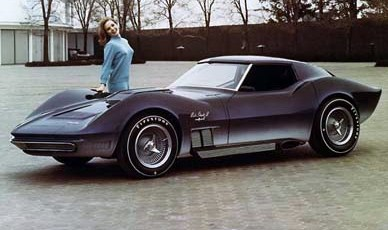
1965 Mako Shark II concept

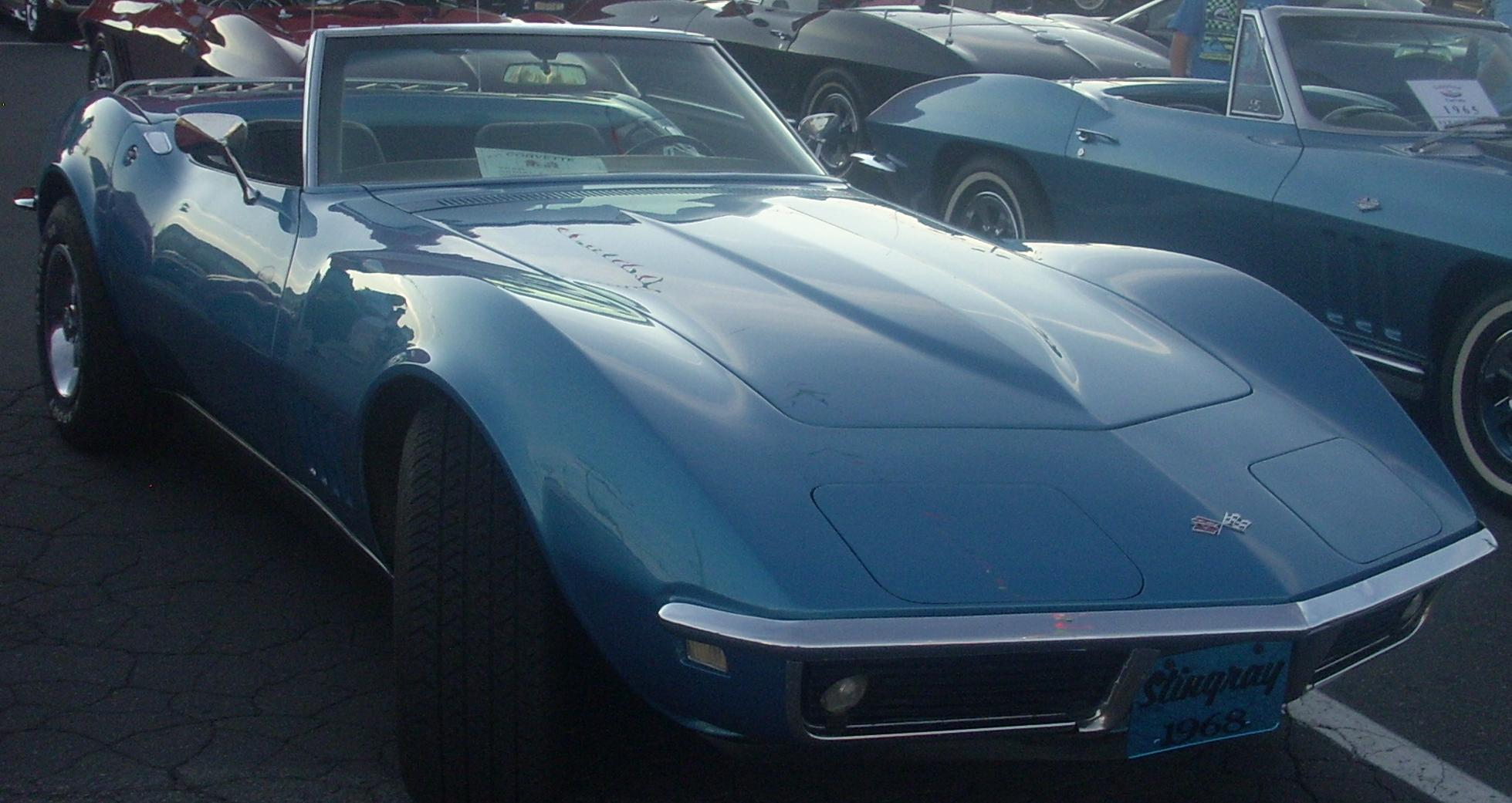
1968 Corvette Sting Ray Convertible

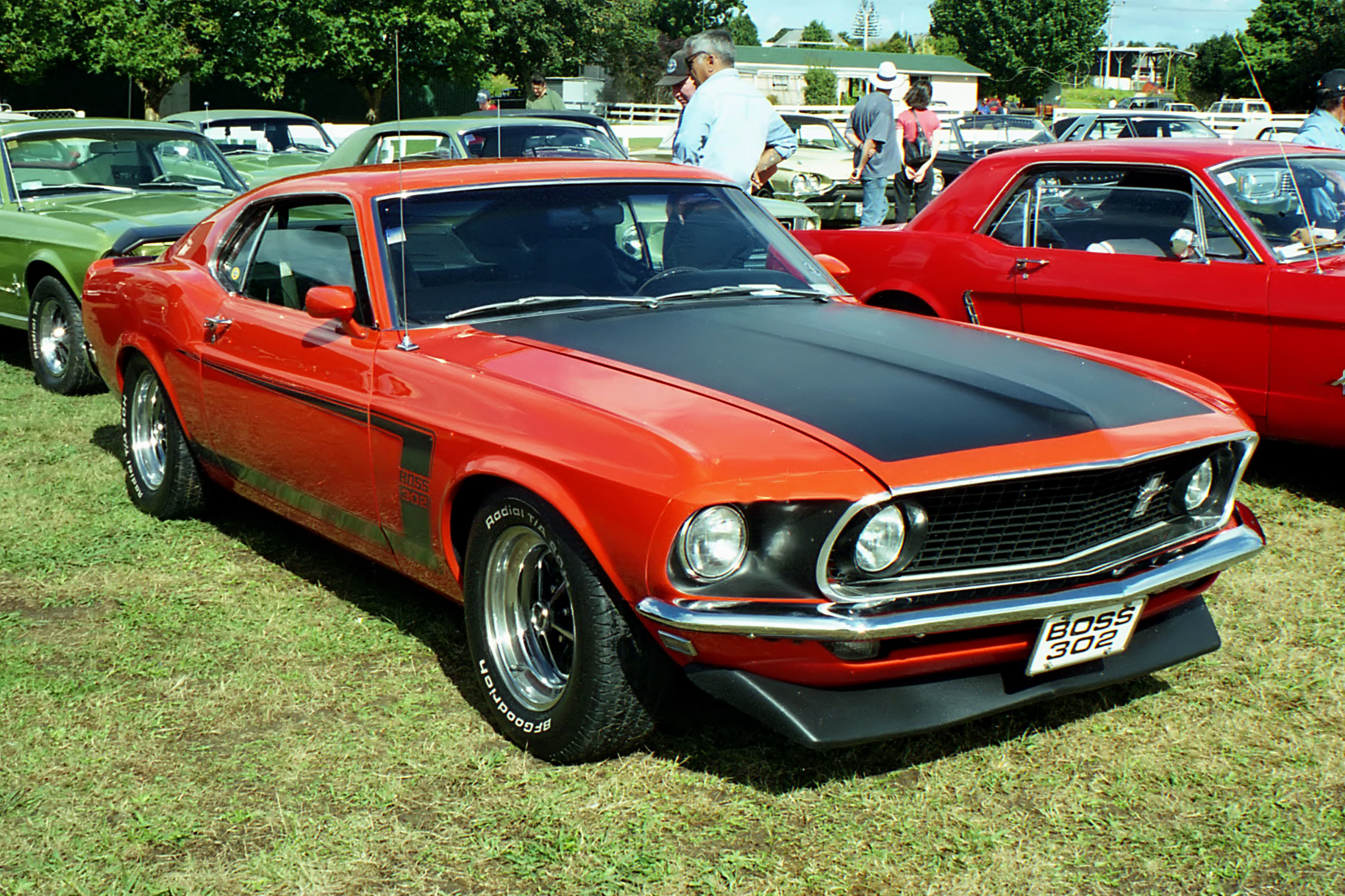
1969 Boss 302 Mustang
