= Mako Shark (concept car) =

Mako Shark Concept
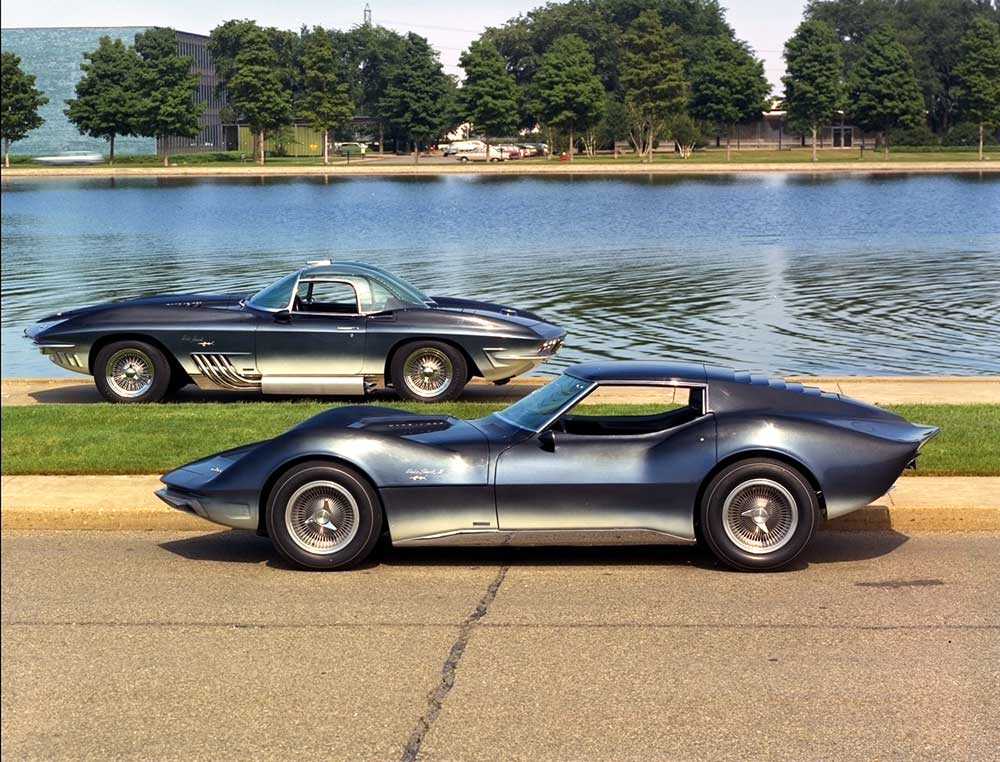
- Mako Shark II in front of the first — GM Technical Center in Warren, Michigan

Overview
- Manufacturer: Chevrolet (General Motors)
- Production: 1962
- Designer: GM Styling & Design; Bill Mitchell; Larry Shinoda

Body and chassis
- Class: Concept sports car
- Body style: 2-door convertible 2-door hardtop
- Related: Chevrolet Corvette (C2); Chevrolet Corvette (C3) (Mako Shark II)

The XP-755 concept car, also known as the Mako Shark, was designed by Larry Shinoda under the direction of General Motors Styling and Design head Bill Mitchell. With the 1963 Corvette C2 design locked down, in 1961 as a concept for future Chevrolet Corvette the groundwork for the XP-755 was laid down. Building on the design of the 1958 XP-700 "double bubble", the XP-755 added design elements of the soon to be released C2 Corvette. In keeping with the name, the streamlining, pointed snout, and other detailing was partly inspired by the sleek, fast-moving shortfin mako shark. The '61 Corvette tail was given two additional tail lights (six total) for the concept car. The concept was also inspired by Bill Mitchell's 1959 Stingray racer XP-87 which also influenced the 1963 Corvette Sting Ray. Charles M. Jordan's son, Mark reports that the XP-755 was built out of the 1958 XP-700 Corvette show-car.

The Mako Shark debuted at the New York Coliseum at the 1962 6th International Automobile Show, and the car was a success on the auto show circuit. With many of the Mako's design elements making into production on future Corvettes, it was successful in building hype for the forthcoming next generation of Corvette.

Like many show cars, the Mako Shark underwent styling and detail changes over time. The hood and front facia were modified and the interior was updated. The car also lost the distinctive "double-bubble" canopy. The car was retroactively dubbed the Mako Shark I when the Mako Shark II debuted. The car now resides in the GM Heritage Collection.

== TV Appearance ==
The XP-755 Mako Shark was used in Route 66 that aired in October 1961, most likely as a result of General Motors supplying vehicles that were driven in the series. In this particular episode, the main characters Buzz and Tod drive a 1962 Corvette while another character, Prudie Adams, drives the pre-modified XP-755. It can be seen at time marks 14:13, 25:12, 32:37 and 39:54.

== Gallery ==
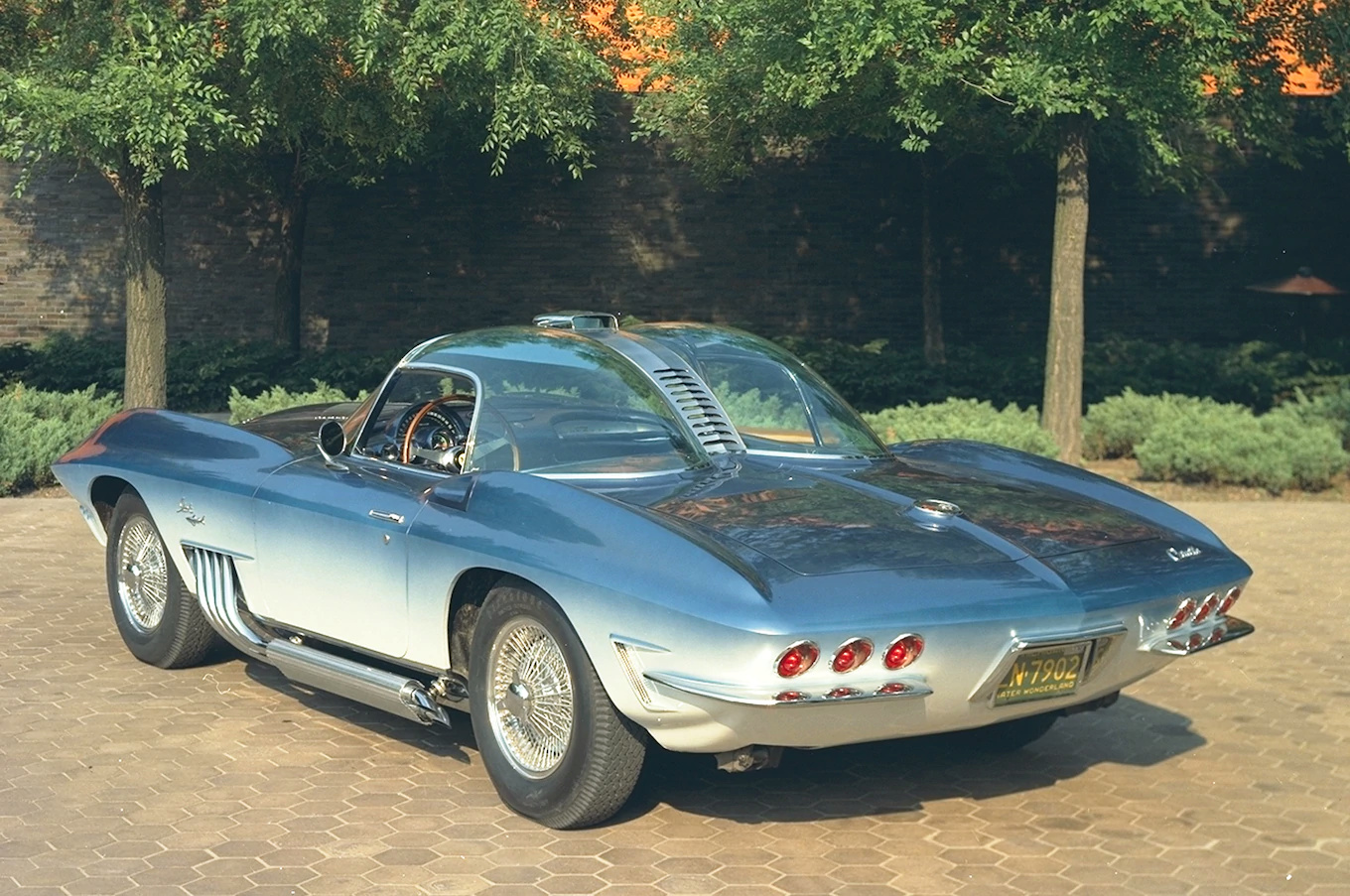
Mako Shark, rear view (pre-modifications)

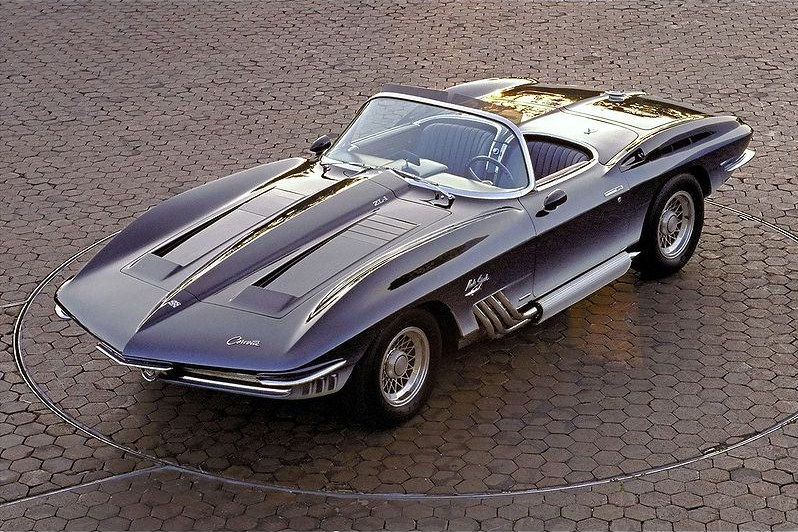
Mako Shark, front view (post-modifications)

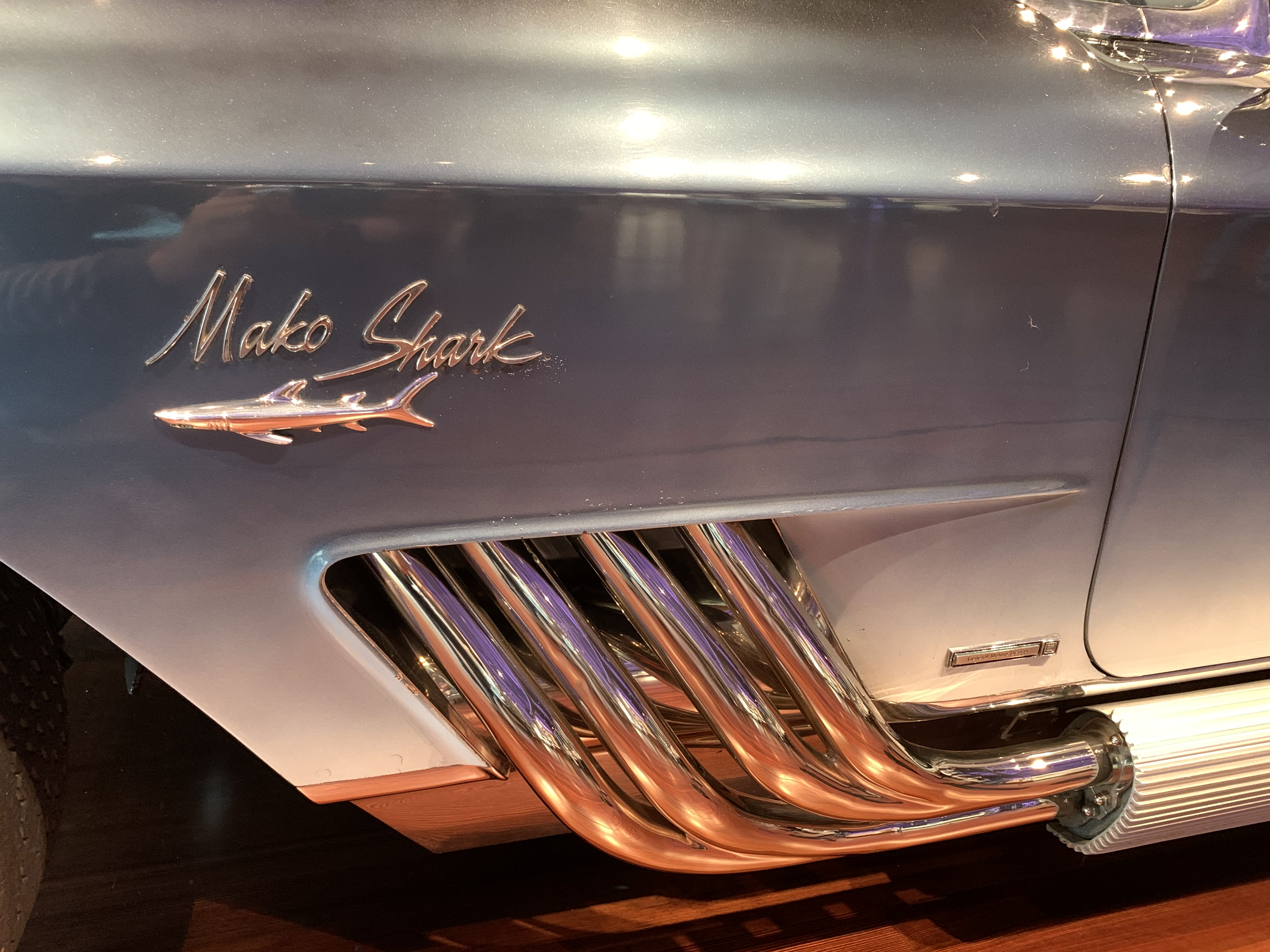
Mako Shark close-up view of exhaust pipes (post-modifications)

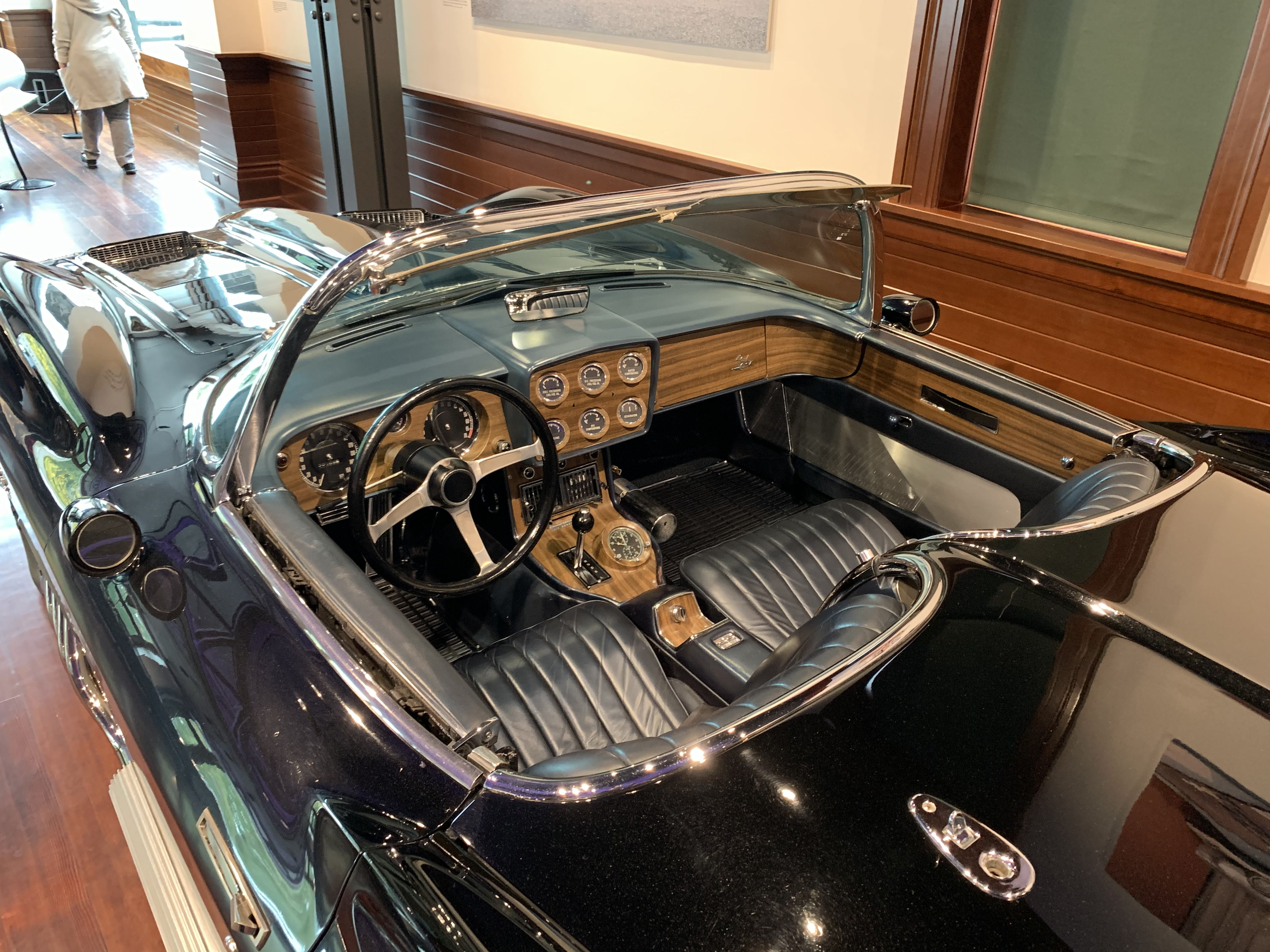
Mako Shark interior view (post-modifications)

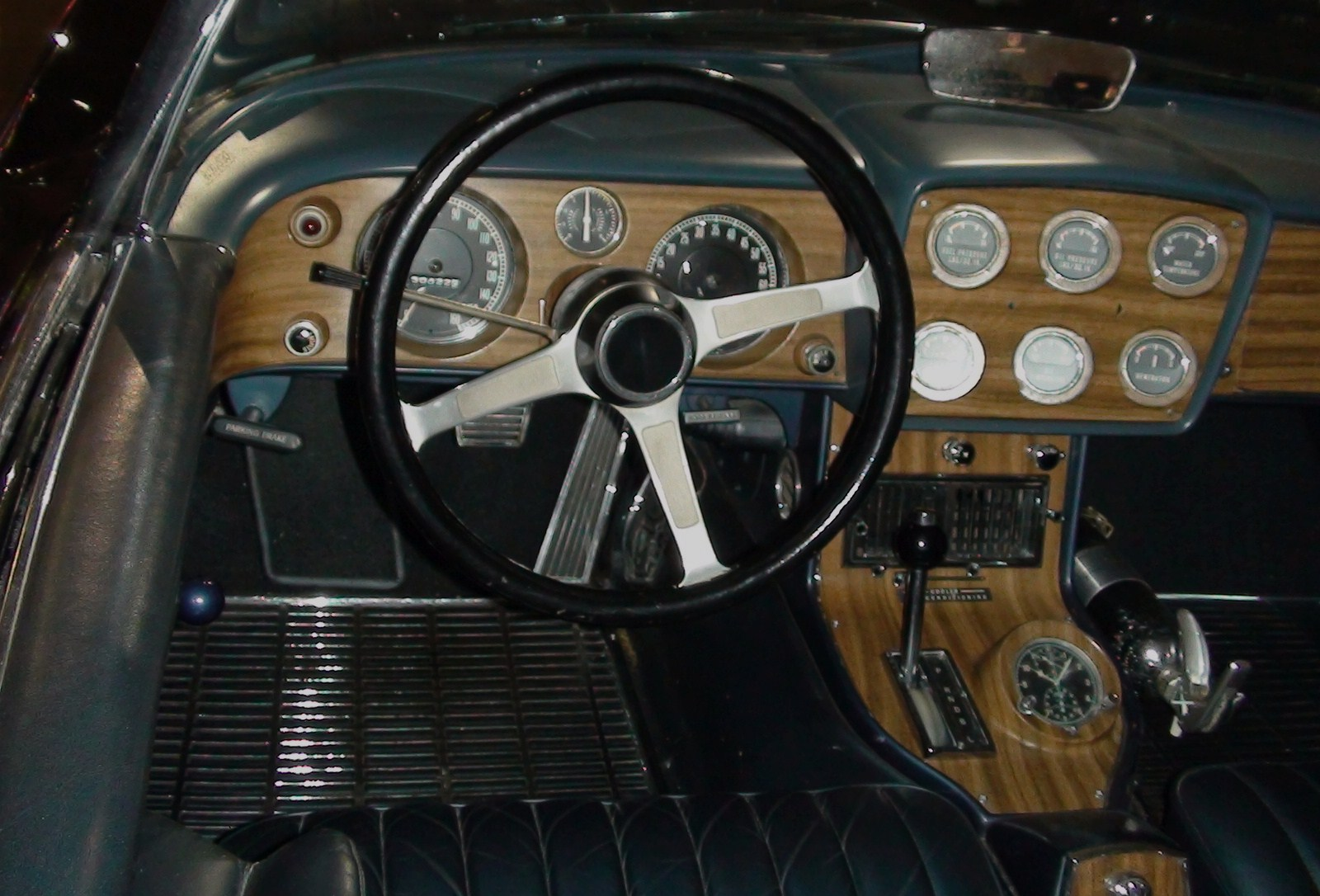
Mako Shark interior (post-modifications)

== Mako Shark II ==
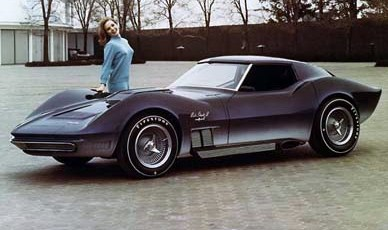
1965 Mako Shark II

Bill Mitchell's design brief for the XP-830 was as follows:

"a narrow, slim, center section and coupe body, a tapered tail, an all-of-a-piece blending of the upper and lower portions of the body through the center (avoiding the look of a roof added to a body), and prominent wheels with their protective fenders distinctly separate from the main body, yet grafted organically to it."

The Mako Shark II concept strongly influenced the all new exterior design of the 3rd generation (C3) Corvette introduced for 1968. Especially, in addition to the pointy shark nose, the very curvaceous fenders over the front and rear wheel openings, contributed to the strong 'Coca Cola bottle' look of the C3 Corvette, that in a more subtle way continued in its C4 successor.

Chevrolet created two copies - only one of which was fully functional. The non-running show car sported more futuristic details, such as square section side pipes and a squared-off steering wheel. This car debuted at the 1965 New York Auto Show. The second, running show-car, made its debut at the 1965 Paris Motor Show, with more conventional steering wheel and exhaust. The car did have a retractable rear spoiler, and a square section bumper that could be extended for added protection. The Mako Shark II was powered by a 427 Mark IV engine, which did become available on production Corvette models. The paint scheme was similar to the original Mako Shark, with dark blue/gray on top, fading gradually downwards into silver/white at the rockers.

In 1965, the Mako Shark II was also on display 1964/5 New York World's Fair in the General Motors Futurama Pavilion.

After the pure show-car made the rounds on the auto show circuit, it was returned to GM where it was dismantled. The running car would be given a reprieve and return to the show car circuit in modified form as the Manta Ray in 1969.

=== Baldwin Maco Shark ===
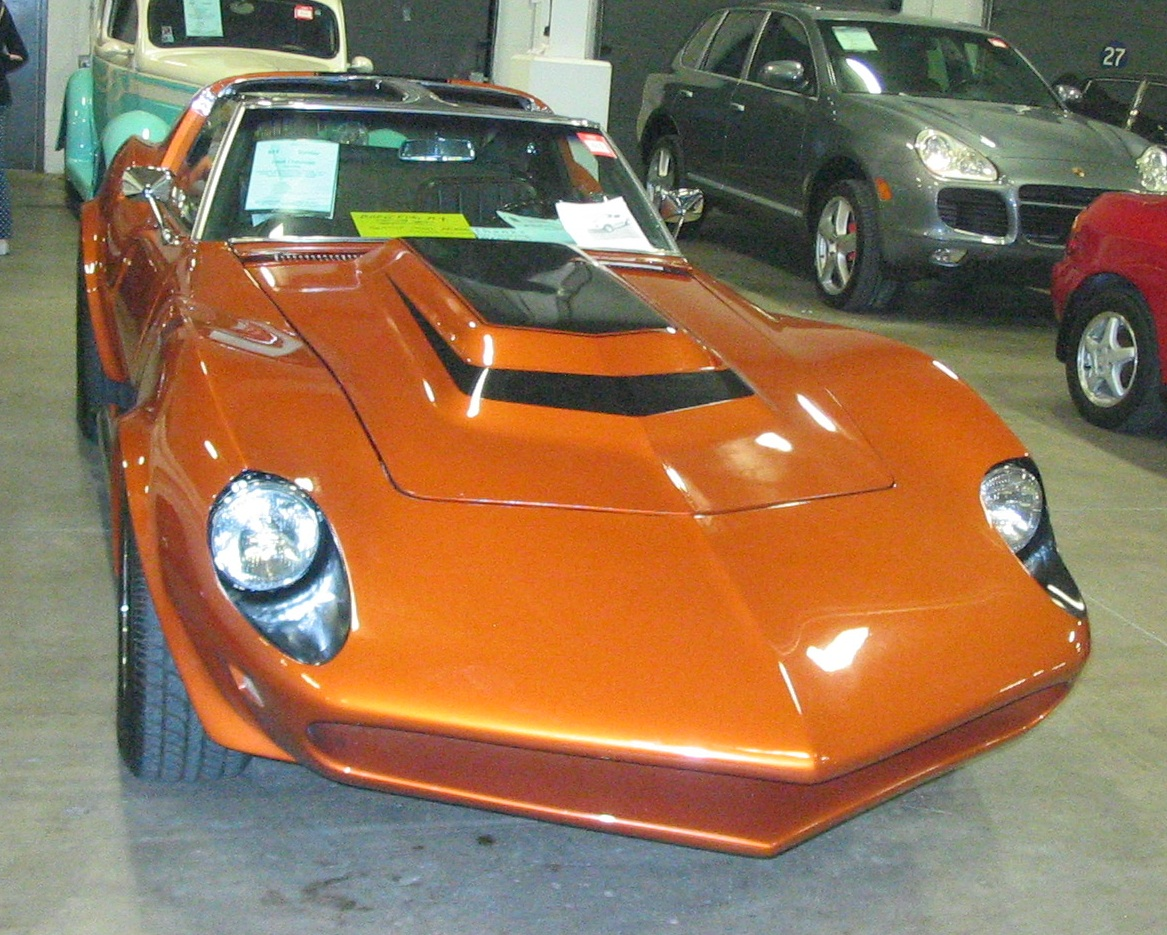
Baldwin Phase III GT with similar front end to Baldwin Manta Ray

Many consumers were disappointed at the translation of the Mako Shark II into production reality with the 1968 C3 Corvette. Hot rodder and customizer Joe Silva was one of those, and used his skills to create a fiberglass kit to transform the C3 Corvette into road-going Mako Shark. Joel Rosen of Baldwin-Motion supercar performance fame added his mechanical expertise to the project, bringing the Phase III GT performance package (and some re-engineering of the kit) to Silva's fiberglass body. In order to avoid legal issues with GM, they changed the name of their product to "Maco Shark". Silva created the fiberglass panels and basic components, while Rosen handled the mechanical, chassis and suspension upgrades along with marketing. Rosen continued to build variations on the Maco Shark theme for the next decade, including a Manta Ray version with tunneled headlights and an even more radical Morey Eel version.

=== Manta Ray ===
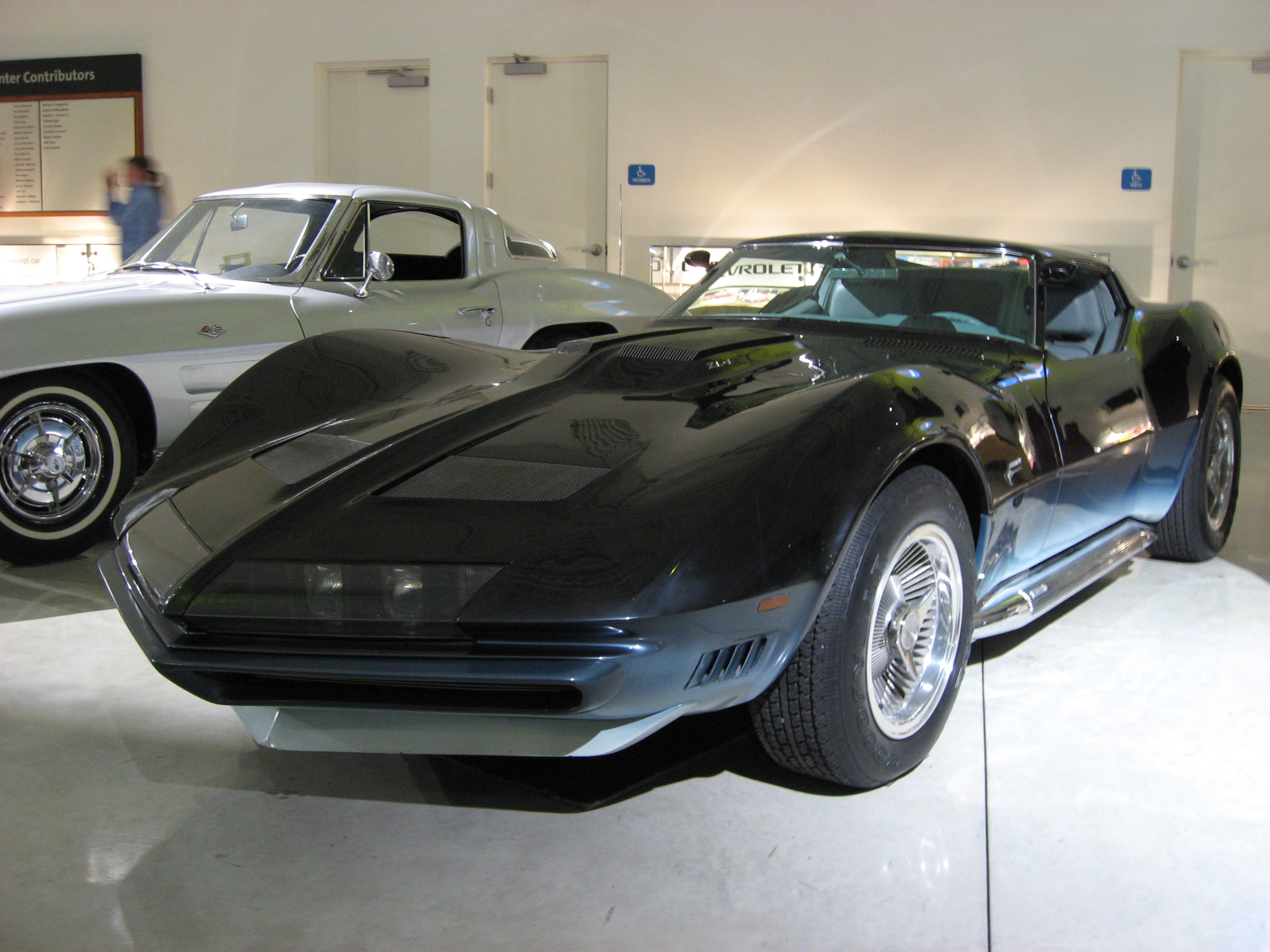
The running Mako Shark II was restyled, and became the 'Manta Ray'

In 1969, the Mako Shark II was returned to GM Design Studios and transformed into the Manta Ray. Modifications included a front spoiler and redesigned grille and external exhaust pipes. Modifications were also made to the rear that included a buttress style rear window and a longer more horizontal end section. The Firestone tires were replaced with Goodyear tires. Both Mako I and Manta Ray are currently part of the GM Heritage Center Collection. A new, all-aluminum ZL-1 427ci (making approximately 430 horsepower) was installed in the revised car.

The Manta Ray resides in the GM Heritage Collection.

==== 2020 Corvette ====
In 2016 General Motors filed a trademark on the name "Manta Ray", leading to much speculation on how (or if) the name would be used. In the run-up to the introduction to the 2020 C8 Corvette, many believed that it would be called the Manta Ray. Chevrolet decided not to resurrect the name and stuck with the Stingray name for the C8.

=== Tribute Car ===
In 2013, Hanspeter Boehi from Muenchenstein, Switzerland started work on a tribute car to the Mako Shark II as it appeared in Geneva, Switzerland in 1966. He used a 1969 C3 Corvette (big-block) as his starting point, fabricating everything as necessary. Boehi used drawings from the US Patent Office and images from the Geneva show to help guide the process of building a running version of the non-operational show car.

=== Gallery ===
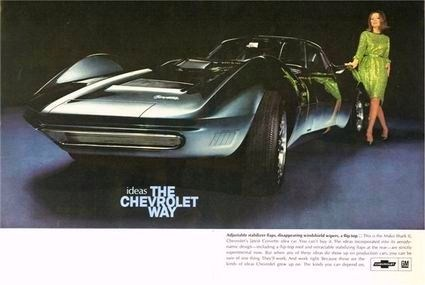
Mako Shark II Advertisement

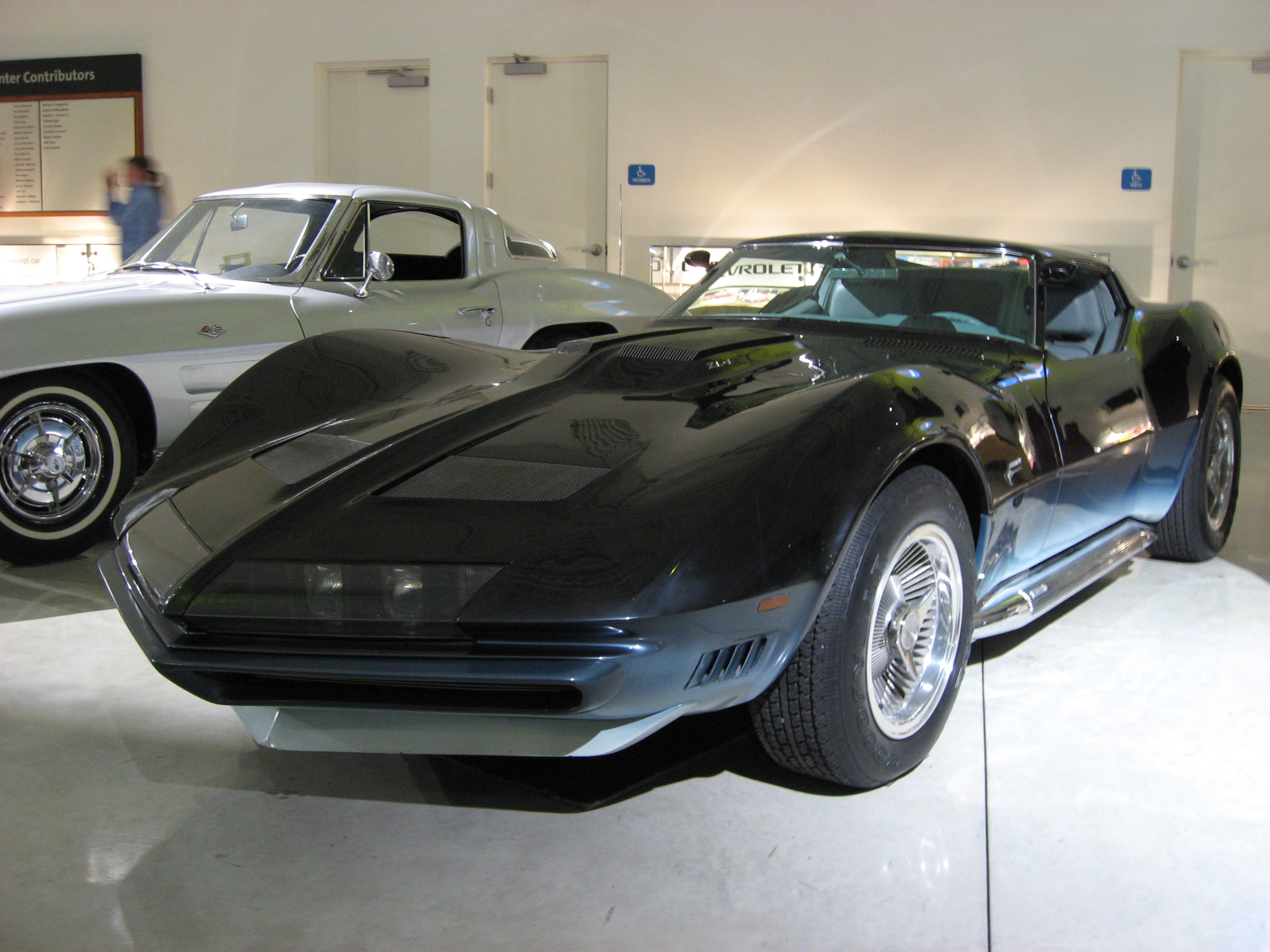
Manta Ray

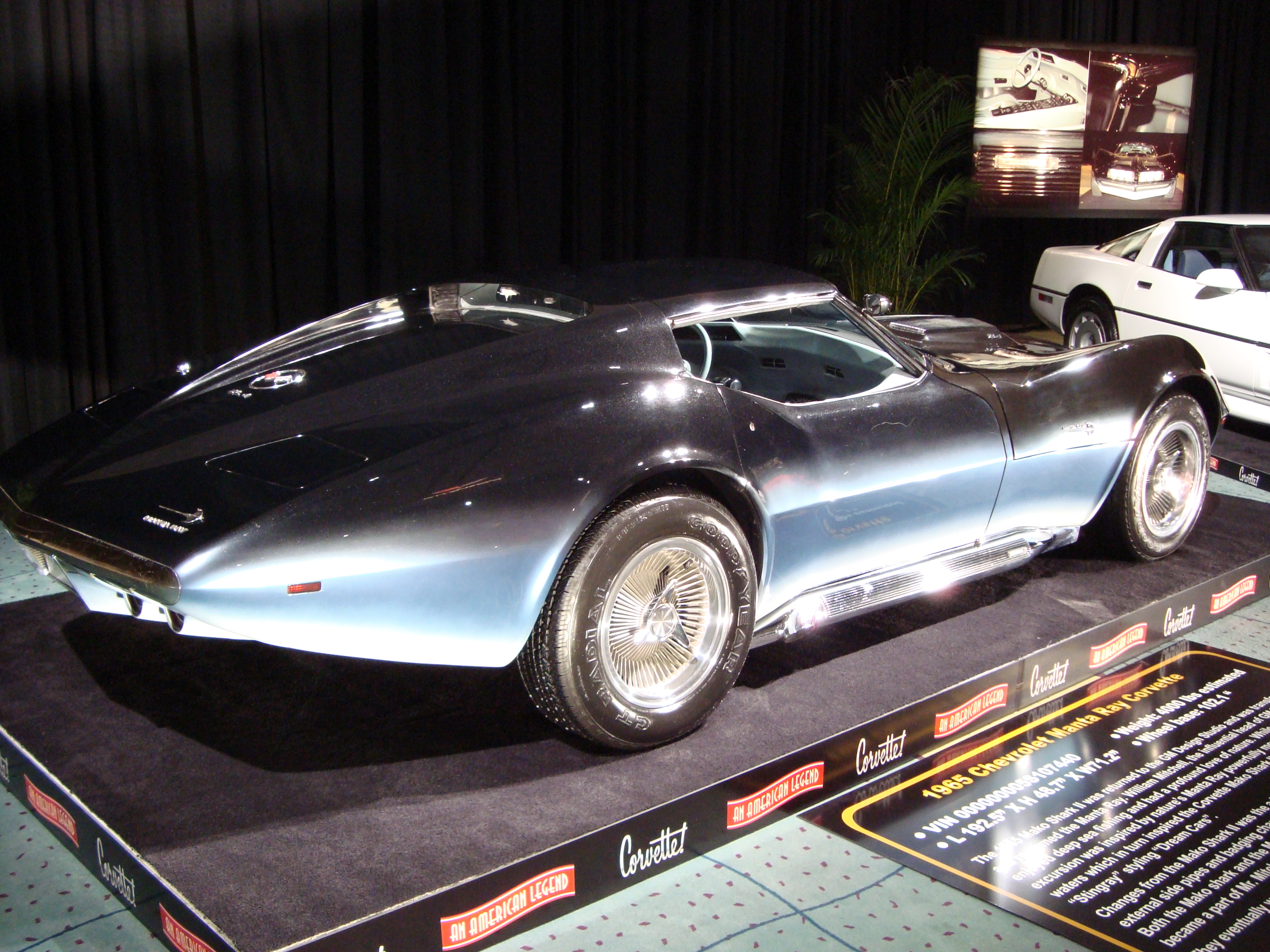
Manta Ray, rear view

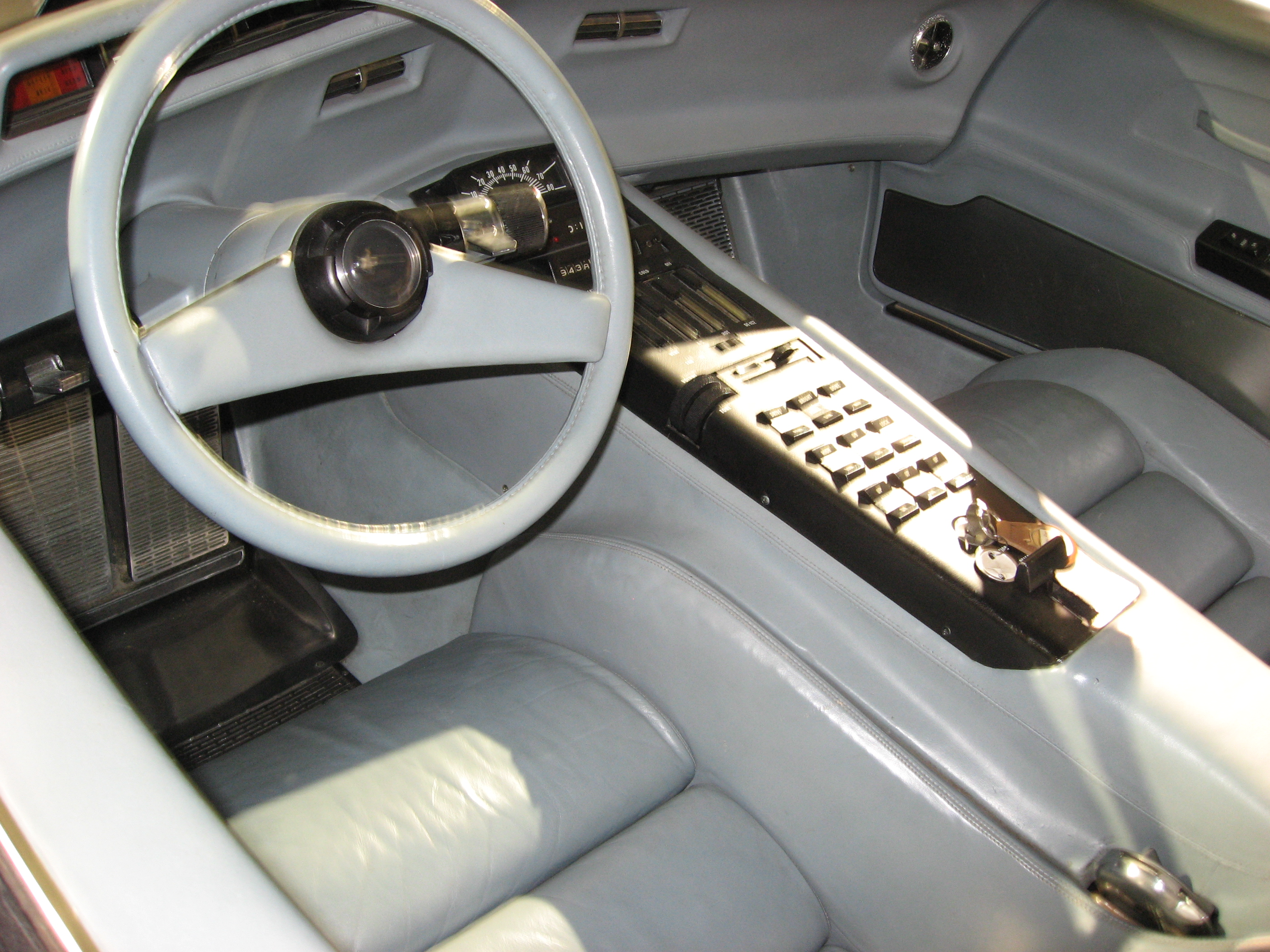
Manta Ray, interior

== See also ==
- Chevrolet Corvette: Concept cars
- Chevrolet Corvette (C2)
- Chevrolet Corvette (C3)
