= 1957 12 Hours of Sebring =

Sports car endurance race

Sebring International Raceway in 1952-1966

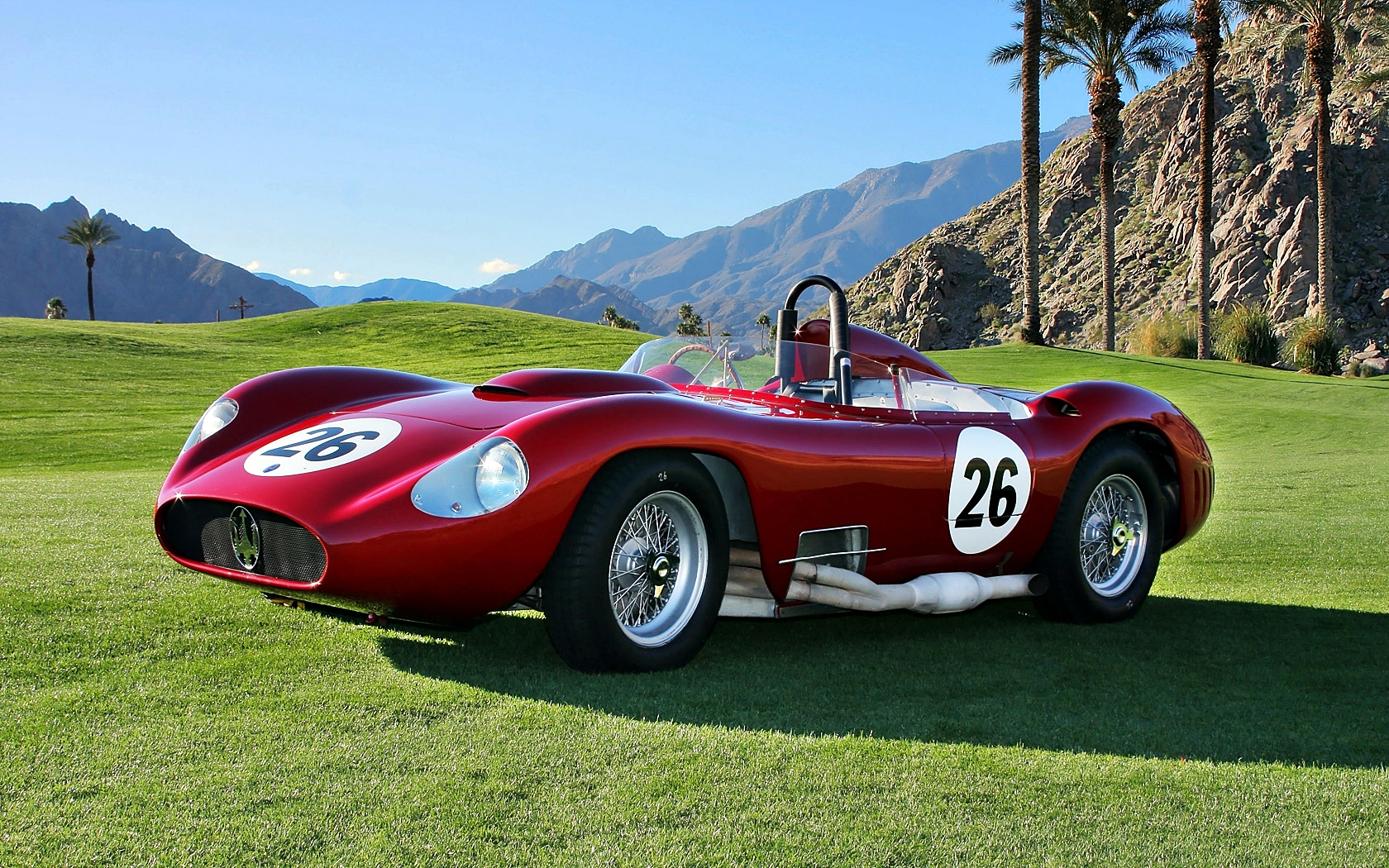
A Maserati 450S, similar to the race-winning car of Fangio & Behra, at the 2010 Annual Desert Classic Concours d’Elegance

The 1957 12-Hour Florida International Grand Prix of Endurance for The Amoco Trophy took place on 23 March, on the Sebring International Raceway, (Florida, United States). It was the second round of the F.I.A. World Sports Car Championship. This was sixth running of the 12-hour race, and with the growing popularity of sports car racing in post World War II America, the event was finally coming into its own since its creation in 1952.

Besides the governor of Florida, LeRoy Collins, who proclaimed March 18–23, 1957 as International Sports Car Race Week, thus gaining additional media attention for the event, the people of New York and Detroit were well aware of the significance of this race. For weeks leading up to the event, national newspapers and magazines who fed the public's interest by reporting on the international celebrities who would drive in it, like Marquis de Portago of Spain and Count Wolfgang von Trips of Germany.

Just days before the race, the Fédération Internationale de l'Automobile issued an appendix to its rules concerning the race, mandating that during the first tyre change, the team had to use the spare tyre that all the cars were required to carry. While this did not affect the Corvette and some other cars, but for the Ferrari and Maserati, it was a major problem, as on their cars, the wheel on the front and rear of the cars were of different sizes. Ferrari's Peter Collins, a representative from Maserati and the organiser, Alec Ulmann then met with the FIA to discuss this problem. Collins told the press that these changes were in violation of FIA's own rules concerning how such changes were adopted. Supposedly any rule changes had to be unanimously approved by all the competitors or it is rejected. It is assumed that this argument carried the day with the FIA, and the race saved. The even-vocal Collins also had a few words to say about the use of 55-gallon oil drums outlining the track. Despite the Englishman protested that their use was "very, very dangerous..." and that they should be "banned", Sebring continued to use them for several more years.

== Report ==
=== Entry ===
A massive total of 86 racing cars were registered for this event, of which 76 arrived for practice. Only these, 66 qualified for, and started the race. Of the several media stories circulating about this race was that Chevrolet Division of General Motors Company would challenge the European dominance by entering four Corvette sport cars. One of these would be a radically new car, the magnesium-alloy bodied Corvette SS, with its 4,638 c.c. engine complete with lightweight aluminum cylinder heads. In addition to this elegant metallic-blue SS, there was an SS development mule, equipped with a standard Corvette engine and a plastic body. Despite looking shabby, it was very fast and in the days prior to the event, other race drivers were constantly asking Chevy competition director, Zora Arkus-Duntov for a chance to drive one of the SS's. He would only a selected few to drive one of these. After finishing practice in their Maseratis, both Juan Manuel Fangio and Stirling Moss were allowed by Duntov to take a courtesy run in the practice car. Within two laps, Fangio broke the course lap record.

The other story ahead of Sebring, was the defection of Fangio to Officine Alfieri Maserati from the Scuderia Ferrari. Fangio had won this event for Ferrari in 1956. In their attempt to lure Fangio from Ferrari, Maserati offered to supply him with no less than six brand new race cars for testing. He picked a 450S for the race, which he eventually drove to victory at Sebring. Meanwhile, back at Maranello, the burden for winning for Ferrari at Sebring fell on the shoulders of Eugenio Castellotti, who partnered Fangio in 1956. However, on 14 March, Castellotti was testing a Formula One Ferrari at the Aerautodromo di Modena when he was crashed heavily, dying instantly from his injuries.

Prior to the race, a small crowd of photographers was snapping away at the Renault Company pits. It seemed that Gilberte Thirion and Nadège Ferrier, who were scheduled to drive an 845cc Renault Dauphine, were posing for the press, while only few photographers were seen elsewhere down the pit lane. Perhaps, the likes of Fangio and Collins, were not as pretty as these female drivers.

Meanwhile, Lotus Cars had brought four Lotus Elevens over from Norfolk. Their designer and founder, Colin Chapman had an innovative way of financing the works team effort at Sebring. All four entries were pre-sold to American customers. If you purchased an Eleven, you got to drive it in the race, but you couldn't take possession of the car until after the race. Therefore, during the race it was a Factory Lotus, however afterwards, the car was yours, or what's left of it was yours.

=== Qualifying ===
Because there were no qualifying sessions to set the grid, the starting positions were decided according to engine size with the 4.6 litre Corvette of John Fitch and Piero Taruffi in first place. Next was another Lindsay Hopkins entered Corvette of Paul O'Shea and Pete Lovely. In fact Corvettes held the first four places. Next in line were the two 450S Maseratis, followed by a half dozen Jaguar D-types.

=== Race ===
Collins, in a Ferrari 315 S was the first away with Moss not far behind, but the engine in Moss's Maserati 300S sputtered for a brief moment, handing Collins a commanding lead. The rest of the field followed with the small Dauphines bringing up the rear. By the end of lap one, Collins was already ten seconds clear of Moss, with the Maserati 450S of Behra not far behind.

Within the first 60 minutes, the new Corvette SS began to experience brake troubles and pitted to have these checked, while there also changed their tyres. The Briggs Cunningham Jaguar D-Type, driven by Bill Lloyd was the first to retire with engine problems, as Collins continued to lead with Behra now in second, just a few seconds down on Collins. Moss was now running in third, with Portago fourth in his Ferrari 315 S. Masten Gregory and Phil Hill rounded out the top six in their Ferraris. As the cars moved into the second hour, the heat started to take its toll on both the cars and the drivers alike. The Maserati 150S of Lloyd Ruby blew its engine and retired. Behra moved into the lead, now ahead of Collins by over a minute at the two-hour mark, with Portago, Moss, and Gregory completing the top five.

During the third hour tragedy struck, when Bob Goldich, driving an Arnolt Bolide, crashed at the Esses and flipped his car several times. He died instantly of a fractured skull and broken neck. When news of Goldich's death reached Stanley Arnolt, he withdrew the rest of his team. This marked the first death of a driver in the history of the Sebring race.

At 13:15 Behra pitted and handed his 450S over to Fangio. During his spell, Behra had broken the lap record several times, and at this point, had a fairly large lead over teammate Moss. The Ferraris of Collins and Portago were third and fourth with Carroll Shelby now in fifth in a Maserati.

By 15:00, the Corvette SS was listed amongst the retirements. Word from the pit lane, was that persistent overheating problems led to the withdrawal, although the official classifications show the cause to be failed rear suspension. Fangio was still leading and Moss finally decided to hand his car over to his co-driver, Harry Schell. At 15:19, Portago brought his Ferrari with serious brake trouble. The mechanics couldn't seem to remedy the problem and let the car back onto the track with Luigi Musso behind the wheel. Portago reported that the car had "no brakes". By the end of the hour, Mike Hawthorn brought his Jaguar D-Type in for a brake change.

At the half-way point, the Maserati Factory team had Fangio leading the race, but a major mistake by the team led to a disqualification. It seemed that Fangio and Shelby were running low on fuel. Shelby brought his 250S in and had begun refuelling when he was told to get back on the track because Fangio was due in. After Fangio was serviced and cleared the pits, Shelby returned to the pits for the remainder of his fuel, but was immediately disqualified. There was a FIA rule that stated you had to drive at least 20 laps before you could come in for more fuel, and the Maserati team had forgotten this rule.

After 10 hours of racing, Fangio was still leading with Hawthorn, Portago and Schell following. That order hadn't changed in over an hour. The Ferrari of Portago had to pit because of a problem with his fuel pump, which cost him 30 minutes. Moss continued to gain on the leaders. By 21:00, Fangio was still at the wheel of his car and was now four laps ahead. Because of pit stops and driver changes Moss was now in second with Hawthorn dropping to third, Gregory fourth and Walt Hansgen now in fifth. In the factory Ferrari, Collins was way off the pace due to failing brakes. The small but reliable Porsche 550s were now in 8th, 9th and 10th position.

With just 30 minutes to go, there was some commotion in the Maserati pits. It seemed that during the scheduled final pit stop a mechanic had spilled a large quantity of fuel on Fangio's seat. In typical Italian fashion there was a lot of yelling and hand gestures, meanwhile, the team manager went off to find a replacement seat. They found one and Fangio returned to the race with his lead reduced. With less than half-hour to go and everyone in the Maserati pits was holding his breath.

At 10 p.m. fireworks appeared over the track. This signalled the end of the race and a tremendous victory for Maserati. Coming home in first were Fangio and Behra at the wheel of their Maserati 450S with the Moss/Schell Maserati 300S in second, having reduced the lead down to just two laps. The podium was completed by the Jaguar D-Type of Hawthorn, co-driven by Ivor Bueb, the English pairing salvaging some honour for the Coventry marque. In fourth, Gregory and Lou Brero, who had earlier collapsed due to heat exhaustion, were the first Ferrari to finish. Hansgen and Russ Boss were fifth in a Cunningham Jaguar D-Type, Collins and Maurice Trintignant were sixth in the first of the factory Ferrari 315 S, Portago and Luigi Musso were seventh in the other factory Ferrari 315 S, Art Bunker and Charles Wallace were eighth in a Porsche 550 RS, Jean Pierre Kunstle and Ken Miles were ninth in another Porsche 550 RS. Howard Hively and Richie Ginther rounded out the top ten in their Ferrari 500 TRC. Bunker and Wallace also came away with a first in the Index of Performance which rated cars according to performance.

It was later revealed that Fangio had to get medical attention for painful burn blisters, from his waist down to his knees on his right side. It seems that the insulation that surrounded the exhaust pipes, which ran along the driver's side of the car, had worn away, leaving Fangio's lower body exposed to very, hot temperatures.

== Official Classification ==
Class Winners are in Bold text.

Pos	No	Class	Driver		Entrant	Chassis	Laps	Reason Out
1st	**19**	**S5.0**	(Argentina) **Juan Manuel Fangio**	(France) **Jean Behra**	**Maserati Factory**	**Maserati 450S**	**12hr 00:03.374, 197**	
2nd	**20**	**S3.0**	(United Kingdom) **Stirling Moss**	(United States) **Harry Schell**	**Maserati Factory**	**Maserati 300S**	**195**	
3rd	5	S5.0	(United Kingdom) Mike Hawthorn	(United Kingdom) Ivor Bueb	Jaguar Cars North America	Jaguar D-Type	193	
4th	15	S5.0	(United States) Masten Gregory	(United States) Lou Brero	George Tilp	Ferrari 290 S^{a}	193	
5th	7	S5.0	(United States) Walt Hansgen	(United States) Russ Boss	B. S. Cunningham	Jaguar D-Type	188	
6th	11	S5.0	(United Kingdom) Peter Collins	(France) Maurice Trintignant	Ferrari Factory	Ferrari 315 S	187	
7th	12	S5.0	(Spain) Alfonso de Portago	(Italy) Luigi Musso	Ferrari Factory	Ferrari 315 S	186	
8th	**44**	**S1.5**	(United States) **Art Bunker**	(United States) **Charles Wallace**	**Bunker & Pry**	**Porsche 550 RS**	**185**	
9th	45	S1.5	(United States) Jean-Pierre Kunstle	(United Kingdom) Ken Miles	J. Kunstle	Porsche 550 RS	184	
10th	**28**	**S2.0**	(United States) **Howard Hively**	(United States) **Richie Ginther**	**Temple Buell**	**Ferrari 500 TRC**	**179**	
11th	**59**	**S1.1**	(United Kingdom) **Colin Chapman** (United States) **Dick Dungan**	(United States) **Joe Sheppard**	**Lotus Company**	**Lotus Eleven**	**174**	
12th	**4**	**GT5.0**	(United States) **Dick Thompson**	(Switzerland) **Gaston Andrey**	**John Fitch**	**Chevrolet Corvette C1**	**173**	
13th	47	S1.5	(United States) Harry Beck (United States) Otto Linton	(United States) Hal Stetson	OSCA of Italy	Osca MT4 1500	170	
14th	31	S2.0	(Belgium) Jan de Vroom (United States) David Cunningham	(United States) George Arents	J. de Vroom	Ferrari 500 TRC	169	
DNF	42	S1.5	(United States) Norman Scott	(United States) Frank Bott	Norman Scott	Porsche 550 RS	168	Gearbox
15th	3	GT5.0	(United States) John Kilborn (United States) Dale Duncan	(United States) Jim Jeffords	Lindsay Hopkins	Chevrolet Corvette C1	168	
16th	2	S5.0	(United States) Paul O'Shea	(United States) Pete Lovely	Lindsay Hopkins	Chevrolet Corvette SR-2	166	
DNF	41	S1.5	(West Germany) Hans Herrmann	(United States) Jack McAfee	Porsche Company	Porsche 550 RS	165	Gearbox
17th	36	S2.0	(Venezuela) Juan Fernández (Venezuela) Lino Fayen	(Venezuela) J. L. Droullers	A. C. Car Company	AC Ace	161	
18th	58	S1.1	(United States) Tom Hallock	(United States) Max Goldman	Cooper Company	Cooper-Climax T39	159	
19th	**34**	**GT2.0**	(United States) **Mike Rothschild**	(United States) **Robert Johns**	**Standard-Triumph**	**Triumph TR3**	**159**	
20th	**55**	**GT1.3**	(United States) **Jack Kaplan**	(United States) **Charlie Rainville**	**Jack Kaplan**	**Alfa Romeo Giuletta Spider Veloce**	**158**	
21st	33	GT2.0	(United States) Bob Oker	(United States) Ed Pennybacker	Standard-Triumph	Triumph TR3	156	
22nd	35	S2.0	(United States) Joseph Hap Dressel (United States) William F. Woodbury	(United States) Don Cullen	A. C. Car Company	AC Ace	154	
23rd	**49**	**GT1.6**	(Canada) **Alan R. N. Miller** (United States) **Rowland Keith**	(Canada) **Ed Leavens**	**Hambro Automotive**	**MG A**	**154**	
24th	52	GT1.3	(United States) Sherman Crise	(United States) Alan Markelson	Sir S. Oakes	Alfa Romeo Giuletta Spider Veloce	153	
25th	**18**	**GT3.5**	(United States) **Fred Windridge** (United States) **Rundle Gilbert**	(United States) **George Reed**	**C. Kreisler**	**Mercedes-Benz 300 SL**	**153**	
26th	25	GT3.5	(United States) Gilbert Gietner	(United States) Ray Cuomo	Hambro Automotive	Austin-Healey 100 Special	151	
27th	51	GT1.6	(United States) David Ash (United States) John van Driel	(United States) Gus Ehrman	Hambro Automotive	MG A	150	
28th	**56**	**S750**	(United States) **Herman Behm** (United States) **Sandy MacArthur**	(United States) **Carl Haas**	**Behm Motors**	**Stanguellini S750 Bialbero**	**149**	
29th	32	GT2.0	(United States) Robert Grier	(United States) Bob Kennedy	Robert Grier	Morgan Plus 4	147	
DNF	72	S2.0	(United States) John B. Mull	(United States) Evelyn Mull	A. C. Car Company	AC Ace	146	Rear axle
30th	71	S2.0	(United States) James Cook (United States) Leonard Karber	(United States) Ralph Durbin	J. Cook	Arnolt -Bristol Bolide	146	
31st	40	GT1.6	(West Germany) Huschke von Hanstein	(West Germany) Herbert Linge	Porsche Company	Porsche 356A Carrera	144	
DNF	29	S2.0	(United States) Ed Lunken	(United States) Charles Hassan	E. Lunken	Ferrari 500 TRC	143	Fuel leak
32nd	61	S1.1	(Puerto Rico) Victor Merino (Puerto Rico) Rafael Rosales	(Puerto Rico) Luis Pedrerra	Puerto Rico Club	Lotus-Climax Eleven	141	
33rd	17	GT3.5	(Venezuela) Chester Flynn	(United States) Ed Hugus	C. Flynn	Mercedes-Benz 300 SL	138	
34th	**64**	**T1.0**	(France) **Maurice Michy**	(France) **Maurice Foulgoc**	**Renault Company**	**Renault Dauphine**	**138**	
35th	65	T1.0	(Belgium) Gilberte Thirion (France) G. Spydel	(Switzerland) Nadège Ferrier	Renault Company	Renault Dauphine	138	
36th	50	GT1.6	(United States) Stephen Spitler	(United States) William Kinchloe	Hambro Automotive	MG A	137	
NC	66	T1.0	(Belgium) Paul Frère	(France) Jean Lucas	Renault Company	Renault Dauphine	134	
DNF	16	GT3.5	(Belgium) Olivier Gendebien	(United States) Gene Greenspun	Harry Kullen	Ferrari 250 Europa GT Coupé	111	Engine
DNF	14	S5.0	(United States) Phil Hill	(West Germany) Wolfgang von Trips	Ferrari Factory	Ferrari 290 MM	106	Electrics
DNF	24	GT3.5	(United States) Ray Jackson-Miller	(United States) Elliot Forbes-Robinson	Hambro Automotive	Austin-Healey 100 Special	105	Engine
DNF	23	GT3.5	(United States) Phil Stiles	(United States) John Bentley	Hambro Automotive	Austin-Healey 100 Special	98	Fuel line
DISQ	74	S1.5	(United States) M. R. J. Wyllie (United States) Charles Moran	(United States) Margaret Wyllie	C. Moran	Lotus Eleven Le Mans	89	Assistance
DNF	27	S2.0	(United States) Lance Reventlow	(United States) Bill Pollack	Lance Reventlow	Maserati 200S	88	Engine
DNF	60	S1.1	(United States) Jay Chamberlain	(United States) Ignacio Lozano	Lotus Company	Lotus Eleven	77	Fuel leak
DNF	67	S750	(Argentina) Alejandro de Tomaso	(United States) Isabelle Haskell	Argentine Auto Club	Osca MT4 750	70	
DISQ	21	S3.0	(United Kingdom) Roy Salvadori	(United States) Carroll Shelby	Maserati Company	Maserati 250S	68	Illegal refuel
DNF	63	S1.1	(United States) G. Storr	(United States) Hal Ullrich	B. Stevens	D.B. HBR5	67	Engine
DNF	26	S2.0	(United States) Jim Kimberly	(United States) Ted Boynton	James Kimberly	Maserati 200S I	58	Gearbox
DNF	22	S3.0	(Sweden) Jo Bonnier	(Italy) Giorgio Scarlatti	A. V. Dayton	Maserati 150S	55	Engine
DNF	38	S2.0	(United States) John Weltz	(United States) Robert Gary	S. H. Arnolt	Arnolt-Bristol Bolide	51	Withdrawn
DNF	8	S5.0	(United States) Pat O'Connor	(United States) Jack Ensley	Jack Ensley	Jaguar D-Type	50	Rear axle
DNF	37	S2.0	(United States) Bob Ballenger	(United States) Jim Peterson	S. H. Arnolt	Arnolt-Bristol Bolide	49	Withdrawn
NC	54	GT1.3	(United States) Louis Comito (United States) Bob Rubin	(United States) Bruce Kessler	L. Comito	Alfa Romeo Giuletta Spider Veloce	42	
DNF	39	S2.0	(United States) Bob Goldich	(United States) S. H. Arnolt	S. H. Arnolt	Arnolt-Bristol Bolide	40	Fatal accident (Goldich)
DNF	30	S2.0	(United States) William Helburn	(United States) Jim Pauley	W. Helburn	Ferrari 500 TRC	38	Cooling system
DNF	9	S5.0	(Cuba) Alfonso Gomez-Mena (Cuba) Santiago González	(United States) Ernie Ericksson	Alfonso Gomez-Mena	Jaguar D-Type	37	Engine
DNF	43	S1.5	(United States) Ed Crawford	(United States) Phil Stewart	E. Crawford	Porsche 550 RS	35	Gearbox
DNF	10	S5.0	(United States) Pete Woods	(United States) Bobby Unser	R. V. Milosevich	Jaguar D-Type	35	Rear axle
DNF	1	S5.0	(United States) John Fitch	(Italy) Piero Taruffi	Lindsay Hopkins	Chevrolet Corvette SS	23	Suspension
DNF	46	S1.5	(United States) Lloyd Ruby	(United States) Bobby Burns	R. Burns	Maserati 150S	20	Valve
DNF	70	GT2.0	(United Kingdom) Jim Roberts	(United States) Ed Pennybacker	Triumph Company	Triumph TR3	10	Suspension
DNF	6	S5.0	(United States) Bill Lloyd	(United States) Briggs Cunningham	B. S. Cunningham	Jaguar D-Type	2	Engine
DNS	53	GT1.3	(United States) Frank Aldhous (United States) Daniel Watters	(United States) Jack Brumby	A. Martinez	Alfa Romeo Giulietta		did not start

a.Ferrari 290 S #15 raced with 290 MM's SOHC engine.

- Fastest Lap: Jean Behra, 3:24.5secs (91.540 mph)

=== Class Winners ===
Class	Winners		
Sports 5000 – Class C	19	Maserati 450S	Behra / Fangio
Sports 3000 – Class D	20	Maserati 300S	Moss / Schell
Sports 2000 – Class E	28	Ferrari 500 TRC	Hively / Ginther
Sports 1500 – Class F	44	Porsche 550 RS	Bunker / Wallace
Sports 1100 – Class G	59	Lotus-Climax Eleven	Chapman / Sheppard / Dungan
Sports 750 – Class H	56	Stanguellini Sport Bialbero 750	Behm / Haas / MacArthur
Grand Touring 5000 – Class 10 II	4	Chevrolet Corvette	Thompson / Andrey
Grand Touring 3500 – Class 9 II	18	Mercedes-Benz 300 SL	Windridge / Reed / Gilbert
Grand Touring 2000 – Class 7 II	34	Triumph TR3	Oker / Pennybacker
Grand Touring 1600 – Class 6 II	49	MGA	Miller / Leavens / Keith
Grand Touring 1300 – Class 5 II	55	Alfa Romeo Giulietta Spider Veloce	Kaplan / Rainville
Touring 1000 – Class 4 I	64	Renault Dauphine	Michy / Foulgoc

== Standings after the race ==
Pos	Championship	Points
1	(Italy) Maserati	14
2	(Italy) Ferrari	11
3	(United Kingdom) Jaguar	7
4	(West Germany) Porsche	1

- Note: Only the top five positions are included in this set of standings.

Championship points were awarded for the first six places in each race in the order of 8-6-4-3-2-1. Manufacturers were only awarded points for their highest finishing car with no points awarded for positions filled by additional cars. Only the best 4 results out of the 7 races could be retained by each manufacturer. Points earned but not counted towards the championship totals are listed within brackets in the above table.

World Sportscar Championship
Previous race: 1000 km Buenos Aires	1957 season	Next race: Mille Miglia
