= Ed Hugus =

American racing driver (1923–2006)

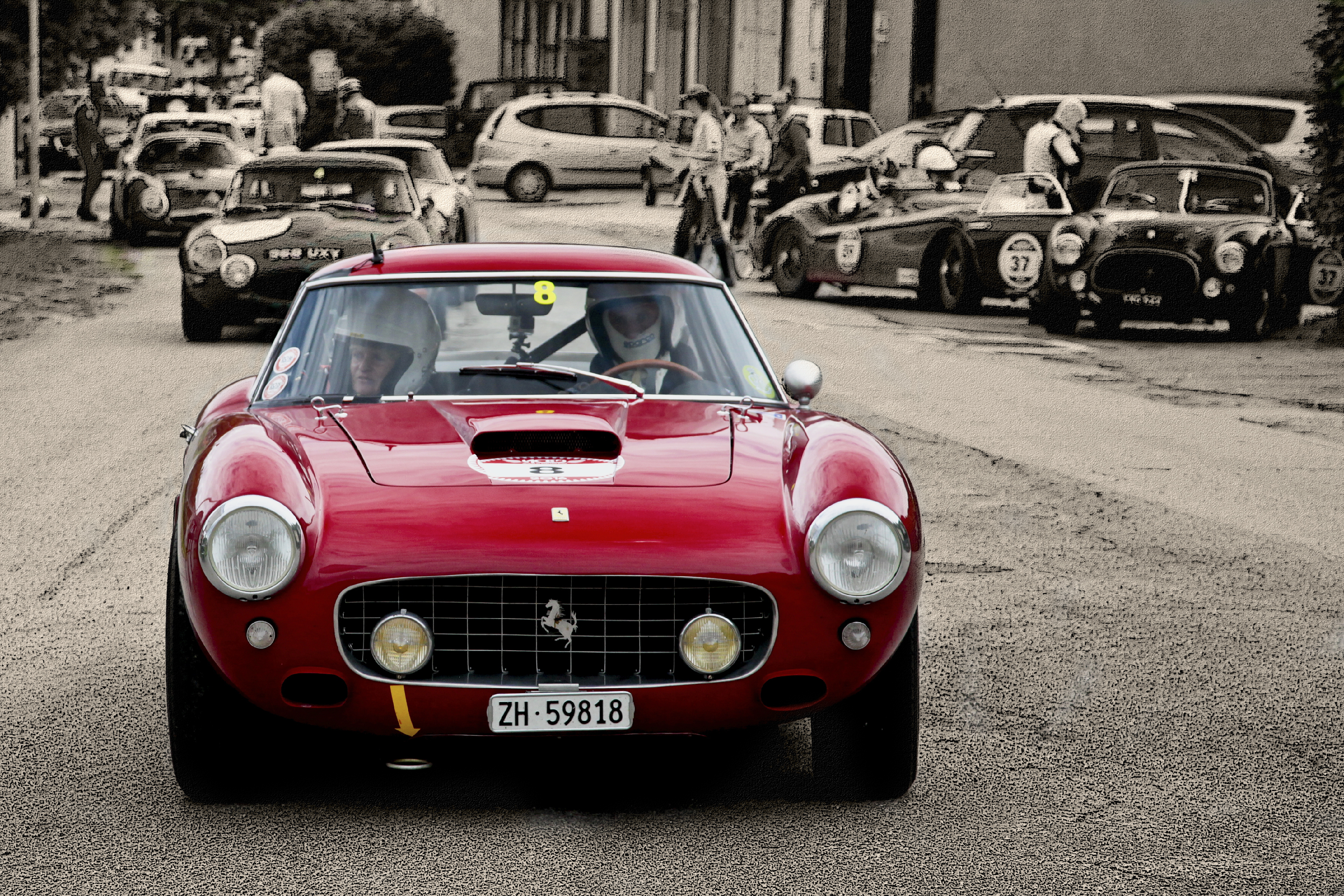
- A 1960 Ferrari 250 in 2016
- Nationality: (United States) American
- Born: Edward James Hugus; 30 June 1923 Pennsylvania, United States
- Died: 29 June 2006 (aged 82) Pebble Beach, California, United States

24 Hours of Le Mans career
- Years: 1956 – 1965
- Teams: Cooper; Privateer; North American Racing Team; Ferrari
- Best finish: 7th (1958, 1960)
- Class wins: 1 (1957)

Edward James Hugus (J. Edward Hugus on his FIA CSI racing licence, 30 June 1923 – 29 June 2006) was an American racing driver and car dealer.

Hugus was a veteran of World War II and as a paratrooper with the 11th Airborne Division on February 16 was dropped on Corregidor for the Battle of Corregidor (1945).

In 1949, Hugus discovered sports cars, got a MG TC, then started an MG dealership in Pittsburgh, also adding Jaguar to the lineup. Hugus was the first Shelby Cobra dealer.

By 1956, Hugus started in two of the biggest sports car racing endurance events, 12 Hours of Sebring in Florida, and 24 Hours of Le Mans in France, and he even competed successfully in South America, where Hugus won his class at the 1957 Venezuelan Grand Prix in a Porsche 550, the type in which James Dean had died. His career as race driver ended after the 1964 Le Mans resp. the 1969 Sebring races.

About 34 years after the 1965 24 Hours of Le Mans, at age 75 and older, with most eyewitnesses already dead, Hugus started to claim that he, too, had been a driver of the winning Ferrari during a foggy night, never getting credit for it. The media did like to believe that Ed did drive that car ... with most of the press and officials either drunk, asleep or both, and picked up the tall tale. It was debunked in 2020 by Doug Nye based on official records of pitstops.

== 24 Hours of Le Mans ==
Between 1956 24 Hours of Le Mans and 1962 24 Hours of Le Mans, Hugus finished 7th, 8th or 9th overall for a total of five times, and two DNF. He won his class, 1.5 Liter Sportscars, together with Carel Godin de Beaufort on his private entry Porsche 550A Lucybelle at the 1957 24 Hours of Le Mans. In 1963 his AC Cobra Coupé was among the entrants DSQed for premature oil changes, and in the 1964 24 Hours of Le Mans, his Ferrari 250 GTO DNF with transmission failure, and his Le Mans driving career ended. At the time, Ferrari and Ford were changing over their customer race cars from traditional front engine GT cars to the mid engine designs that won since 1963.

The 1965 24 Hours of Le Mans was won by the No. 21 Ferrari 250 LM entered by North American Racing Team (NART) of Luigi Chinetti, driven by Masten Gregory and Jochen Rindt, after chasing the eventual 2nd place No. 26 250LM in the night and Sunday morning hours until a tyre failure settled the outcome in favor of the NART team that scored the first ever Le Mans win for Goodyear.

About 1999, after Rindt (1942–1970), Gregory (1932−1985) and Chinetti (1901–1994) had died, Hugus started to claim that he, too, had driven the winning car, and the story circulated, with some sources stating that he raced at Le Mans for 10 consecutive years starting in 1956.

According to Doug Nye in the October 2020 issue of Motor Sport, in a 24 May 2005 letter to race fan Hubert Baradat, Hugus claimed that he was a reserve driver for the team, and when Gregory, who wore glasses, went out at 4 PM and came in when he could not see well, with Rindt absent, Hugus was told by Chinetti to get his helmet on and Go, finishing the last hour of Gregory's part. Chinetti supposedly had tried to inform the pit officials, but maybe they were too busy with a bottle of wine behind the pits, and both were disappointed, as Hugus wrote.

With help from the Automobile Club de l'Ouest Heritage Committee and the official 1965 Journal de Course race records from the ACO archives, Nye found out that Rindt had taken over from Gregory in the car’s eighth pit stop, at 01:59 Sunday morning, June 20, in a very short night with dawn in Le Mans at 04:18 UTC+1 and sunrise at 04:59. After a stop at 03:38, Rindt is named specifically as the incoming driver for the 10th stop at 05:14, and Gregory as the driver who then rejoined at 05:16 for a triple stint, stopping at 06:44 and 07:32 before ending his drive with stop 13 at 08:21 when Gregory is named specifically in the Journal as being the incoming driver. Thus, it must have been in broad daylight, not in night and fog, when Gregory and Hugus supposedly swapped places behind the wheel of a Ferrari that challenged for the lead, not once but twice unnoticed by officials, press, competition and spectators, but with pit stop times recorded in the sheets.

The magazine article photos, taken by Bernard Cahier, Luigi Chinetti Junior and others, show that Hugus, along with Rindt and other team members also dressed in Goodyear-sponsored shirts, were celebrating on and around the winning car steered by Gregory to the podium, but Hugus was dressed like a spectator, with golf hat and sunglasses and sneakers, not like active race drivers or mechanics.

Nye did emerge from this investigation 99 per cent sure that Ed Hugus’ claim simply cannot stand. On the evidence, Masten Gregory and Jochen Rindt won Le Mans 1965, unrelieved by any other driver.

| Year | Team | Co-Drivers | Car | Class | Laps | Pos. | Class Pos. |
|---|---|---|---|---|---|---|---|
| 1956 | (United Kingdom) Cooper Car Company | (United States) John Bentley | Cooper T39 | S1.1 | 252 | 8th | 2nd |
| 1957 | (United States) E. Hugus (private entrant) | (Netherlands) Carel Godin de Beaufort | Porsche 550A | S1.5 | 286 | 8th | 1st |
| 1958 | (United States) E. Hugus (private entrant) | (United States) Ray “Ernie” Erickson | Ferrari 250 TR | S3.0 | 278 | 7th | 4th |
| 1959 | (United States) E. Hugus (private entrant) | (United States) Ray “Ernie” Erickson | Porsche 718 RSK | S1.5 | 240 | DNF (Engine) | |
| 1960 | (United States) North American Racing Team | (United States) Augie Pabst | Ferrari 250 GT SWB | GT3.0 | 299 | 7th | 4th |
| 1961 | (United States) North American Racing Team | (United States) David Cunningham | O.S.C.A. Sport 1000 | S1.0 | 125 | DNF (Clutch) | |
| 1962 | (Italy) SEFAC Ferrari | (United States) George Reed | Ferrari 250 GT SWB Bertone | GT3.0 | 281 | 9th | 3rd |
| 1963 | (United States) E. Hugus (private entrant) | (United Kingdom) Peter Jopp | AC Cobra Coupé | GT+3.0 | 117 | DSQ (Premature oil change) | |
| 1964 | (United States) North American Racing Team | (France) José Rosinski | Ferrari 250 GTO | GT3.0 | 110 | DNF (Propshaft) | |

== Complete 12 Hours of Sebring results ==
| Year | Team | Co-Drivers | Car | Class | Laps | Pos. | Class Pos. |
|---|---|---|---|---|---|---|---|
| 1956 | (United Kingdom) Cooper Car Company | (United States) John Bentley | Cooper T39 | S1.1 | 117 | DNF (Flat battery) | |
| 1957 | (Venezuela) C. Flynn | (Venezuela) Chester Flynn | Mercedes-Benz 300 SL | GT3.5 | 138 | 33rd | 3rd |
| 1958 | (United States) Harry Kullen | (United States) John Fitch | Ferrari 250 TR | S3.0 | 85 | DNF (Engine) | |
| 1959 | (Venezuela) Chester J. Flynn | (United States) Ray “Ernie” Erickson | Porsche 718 RSK | S1.5 | 170 | 10th | 4th |
| 1960 | (United States) North American Racing Team | (United States) Augie Pabst | Ferrari 250 GT SWB | S3.0 | 185 | 4th | 2nd |
| 1961 | (United States) North American Racing Team | (United States) Alan Connell | Dino 246 S | S2.5 | | DNF (Transmission) | |
| 1962 | Scuderia Bear | (United States) George Reed | Ferrari 250 GT SWB EXP | GT3.0 | 187 | 8th | 3rd |
| 1964 | (United States) William McLaughlin | (United States) Enus Wilson (United States) William McLaughlin | Iso Grifo A3C | P+3.0 | 110 | 39th | 7th |
| 1965 | (United States) Ed Hugus (Ferrari; Owners Racing Association) | (United States) Tom O'Brien (United States) Charlie Hayes (United States) Paul Richards | Ferrari 275 P | GTP | 182 | 12th | 5th |
| 1966 | (United States) Ed Hugus | (United States) Lake Underwood | Porsche 906 | P2.0 | 204 | 8th | 4th |
| 1967 | (United States) Ed Hugus | (Canada) John Cannon | Porsche 906 | S2.0 | 138 | DNF (Engine) | |
| 1969 | (United States) Elsco Corporation | (United States) Chuck Dietrich (United States) Eugene Nearburg | BMW 2002 | T2.0 | | DNF (Oil pump shaft) | |
