= 1956 12 Hours of Sebring =

Sports car endurance race

Sebring International Raceway in 1952-1966

The 1956 Florida International Grand Prix of Endurance powered by Amoco took place on 24 March, on the Sebring International Raceway, (Florida, United States). It was the second round of the F.I.A. World Sports Car Championship. For the sixth running of the event, was a sign to many in the automotive community that this race had become North America's premier sports car race, and from an international standpoint second only to the 24 Hours of Le Mans.

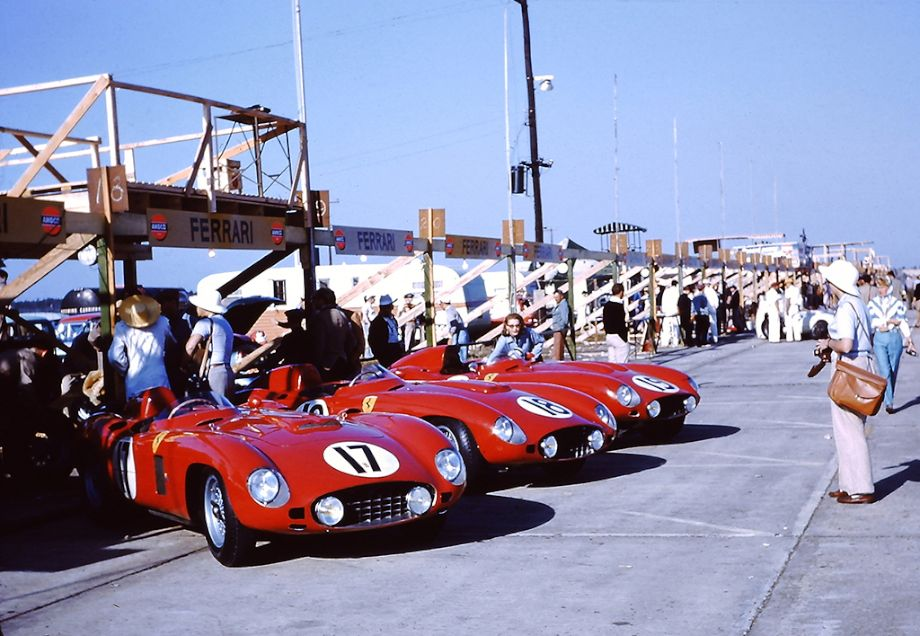
A Ferrari lineup for the race. Car number 17, Ferrari 860 Monza, won the race.

However, this race came just eight months after the disaster at Le Mans. The United States was not immune to the fallout following that race, and the American Automobile Association decide to withdraw from all participation in motor sport. This left the promoters with no international recognition for the race, and therefore no FIA approval. It was very simple; no FIA approval, no international race.

Alec Ullmann, one of those promoters, and founder of Sebring, approached the Sports Car Club of America, but could not maintain its amateur status, if it supported the race. Ullmann did however obtain "special permission" from the FIA to allow him organise the event himself, through his Automobile Racing Club of Florida, and issued the international licenses.

== Report ==
=== Entry ===
A massive total of 74 racing cars were registered for this event, of which 69 arrived for practice. Only 59 qualified for the race. Adding to the build-up to the event, was the announcement that five European factory teams were planning to race in Florida. Those teams were Aston Martin, Ferrari, Jaguar, Maserati and Porsche.

With Ferrari determined to recapture the manufacturer's championship they lost Mercedes-Benz in 1955, Scuderia Ferrari was making its first factory appearance at Sebring. Accompanying the pair of 860 Monzas and a 857 S, were some of the best drivers in the world. They included the reigning World Champion, Juan Manuel Fangio, Eugenio Castellotti, Luigi Musso, Harry Schell, Alfonso de Portago and Olivier Gendebien.

Mike Hawthorn returned after winning in 1955, driving a factory Jaguar D-Type along with Desmond Titterington, Duncan Hamilton, Ivor Bueb, Bill Spear. Hawthorn's entrant from the previous year, Briggs Cunningham was now with the factory outfit, as was Indianapolis 500 winner, Bob Sweikert. A total of nine D-Types would start the race. The other English factory team, Aston Martin was led by Stirling Moss. He had won the opening race of the season, 1000km Buenos Aires for Maserati, but due to race for Aston Martin in Florida, partnership by Peter Collins, whom himself had switched from Ferrari. Their team-mates were Texan Carroll Shelby, Roy Salvadori, Tony Brooks and Reg Parnell with John Wyer managing the team.

Maserati was represented by a pair of 300Ss in the hands Jean Behra and Piero Taruffi driving one car while Carlos Menditéguy and Cesare Perdisa drove the other. Porsche send two of their Porsche 550 Spyder for Hans Herrmann and Wolfgang von Trips in one, and Ed Crawford and Herbert Linge in the other. In a private 550 Spyder, entered by John Edgar Enterprises were Jack McAfee and Pete Lovely.

Taking note of the press interest surrounding the race, General Motors dispatched John Fitch to Florida, in February 1956, in order to get a team of Chevrolet Corvettes sorted out for the 12-hour race. Much to Fitch's dismay the factory prepared ‘race-cars’ were totally unsuitable for the rough Sebring airport course.

=== Qualifying ===
Because they were no qualifying sessions to set the grid, the starting positions were decided according to engine size with the 5.2 litre Corvette of John Fitch and Walt Hansgen in first place. Next was the 5.0 litre Ferrari 375 Plus of Troy Ruttman and Howard Hively. In third place should have been the 4.4 litre Ferrari 735 LM of Jim Kimberly and Ed Linken, however during practice, the car had more than once thrown a flywheel, so Kimberly withdraw the car. Scuderia Ferrari allowed Kimberly to drive with Alfonso de Portago in their 857 Monza. Next in line were three Corvettes with their 4.3 litre engines, and then came eight 3.4 litre Jaguars.

=== Race ===
The race was held over 12 hours on the 5.2 miles Sebring International Raceway. An estimated 47,000 spectators showed on a warm and dry raceday. With the race starting promptly at 10am.

As his car was effective on pole position, Fitch's Corvette was the first car to cross the start line, but before he travelled 300 yards down to the first corner, he was passed by the fuel injected Jaguar D-Type of Mike Hawthorn. This, despite starting down in eighth. To some observes, Stirling Moss was the first to drive away from the grid, but as he started down in 26th he had his work cut out. At the end of the first lap, he was running second to Hawthorn by ten seconds. Juan Manuel Fangio was further six seconds adrift. Carroll Shelby was fourth another twelve seconds down the road. The dubious distinction of being the first retirement of the race went to the factory Corvette of Dale Duncan when the axle broke after just three laps.

After 60 minutes, Hawthorn's D-Type still held the lead followed by Moss in his Aston Martin, Fangio and Musso in their Ferrari, Hamilton in another D-Type. As it would transpire, a close battle between the factory entered D-Types and the 860 Monzas, would ensue for almost eight hours, with the lead changing nine times, as a leader would pit and almost immediately give up it to a competitor and then regain the lead when that car had to pit.

Just after the start of the third hour, the Maserati 300S of Menditéguy, hit hay bales in the Esses and flipped. As a result, he suffered serious injuries with skull fractures and deep lacerations in the face and arm. After a short delay while he laid bleeding trackside, Menditéguy was rushed to the American Red Cross mobile hospital. There, they stabilized him before transferring him to the Weems Hospital in Sebring. Meanwhile, he co-driver would transfer to the Behra/Taruffi 300S.

Around this time, Moss pitted and expressed his doubts that his car could last the distance. The mechanics did what they could and sent Collins out for his stint. Already the hot Florida day, the punishing pace and the rough Sebring track had taken their toll with seventeen cars having to be retired. At the head of the field, Hawthorn was leading from Behra, Fangio took up third, Collins fourth, with de Portago moving into fifth. For the next couple of hours, the lead changed several times between these drivers, with Shelby competing for a spot in the top five.

The D-Type of Hamilton/Bueb suffered an exploded brake cylinder and retired, around the fifth hour mark, while the Aston Martin of Moss/Collins was parked out on course with a terminal gearbox problem.

At the half-way point, the Hawthorn/Titteringham Jaguar was now back in the lead, when Fangio/Castellotti pitted. By now, more than a third of the field had retired. An hour later, Hawthorn was still leading, from Fangio, Musso, Spear and Portago, although Portago's Ferrari, with Kimberly driving, swallowed a valve and became the first Scuderia Ferrari to retire. A valve problem also took the D-Type of Spear and Sherwood Johnston out of the race. For the next four hours, the top three positions frequently changed between the Hawthorn/Titteringham Jaguar, the Fangio/Castellotti Ferrari and the Musso/Schell Ferrari.

Finally the pace was too much for the Hawthorn /Titterington Jaguar and it retired on lap 162 with just over ninety minutes to go in the race. Their D-Type had either led or was in second place for most of the race until the very last pit stop. When Hawthorn pulled into the pits for the last time the brakes were useless. They had locked up on him going into one of the turns and then stopped working. It seems that a brake piston gave way and he lost all brake fluid. The Jaguar mechanics worked on the car for more than fifteen minutes but by then it was too late. Having lost too many laps to the Ferrari of Fangio and Castellotti, they withdrew the car.

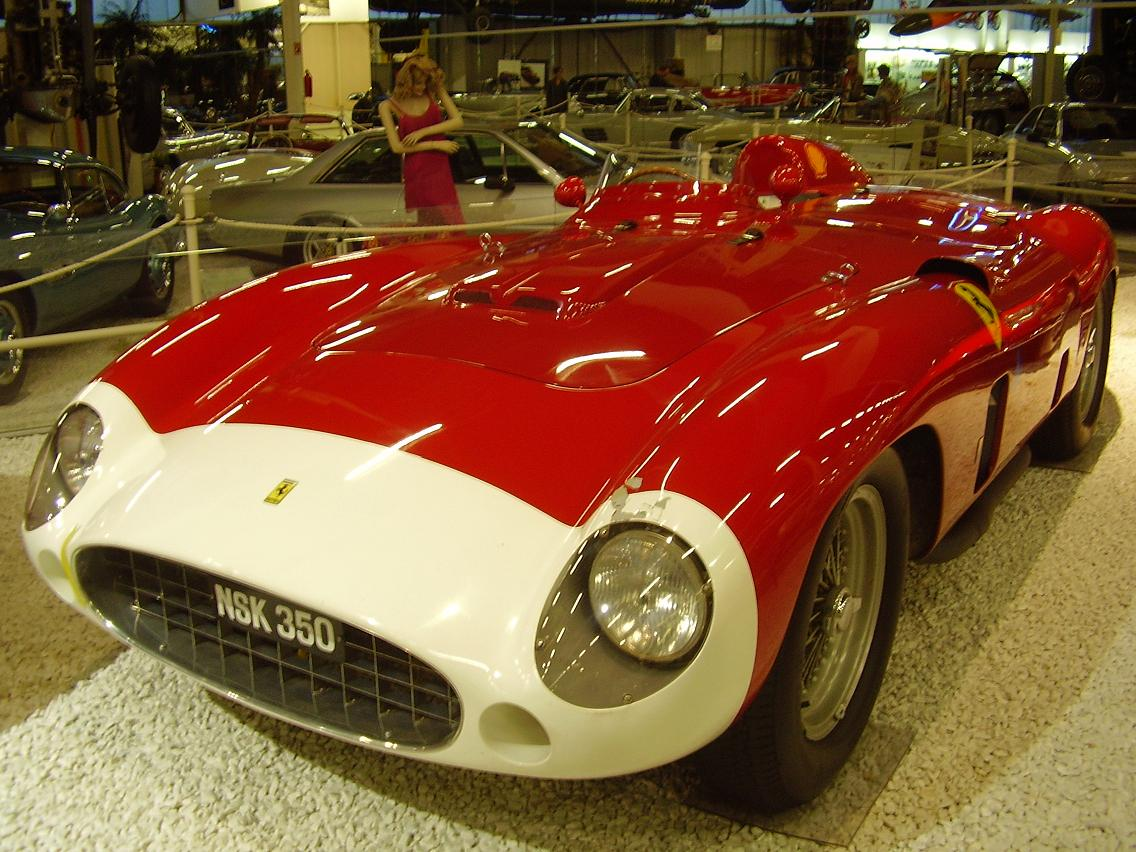
A Ferrari 860 Monza, similar to the race winning car of Fangio & Castellotti, in the Sinsheim Auto & Technik Museum, Sinsheim, Germany

Castellotti began driving at a slower pace now that the Jaguar challenge was gone. He was determined that the car would finish, and started to lap slower than most of the remaining cars left in the race. However, he made sure not to slow down enough to give his team-mates Musso and Schell any chance of catching him. At 10pm, and after 12 hours of racing, Castellotti took the chequered flag, with his 860 Monza completing 194 laps, and a record distance of 1,008.8 miles, averaging a speed of 84.07 mph. This was the first time the thousand mile mark has been arching at the 12 Hours of Sebring.

Coming home in second was the Scuderia Ferrari 860 Monza of Musso and Schell, having completed 192 laps. On their first trip to Sebring, Maranello scored the first one-two sweep ever by a manufacturer. The podium was complete by the Jaguar D-Type of Sweikert, co-driven by Jack Ensley, the American pairing salvaging some honour for the English marque. In fourth, and also a class winner was the Aston Martin of Salvadori and Shelby. Only 24 of the original 59 starters were there at the finish.

== Official Classification ==
Class Winners are in Bold text.

| Pos | No | Class | Driver | | Entrant | Chassis | Laps | Reason Out |
|---|---|---|---|---|---|---|---|---|
| 1st | **17** | **S5.0** | (Argentina) **Juan Manuel Fangio** | (Italy) **Eugenio Castellotti** | **Scuderia Ferrari** | **Ferrari 860 Monza** | **12hr 00:31.198, 194** | |
| 2nd | 18 | S5.0 | (Italy) Luigi Musso | (United States) Harry Schell | Scuderia Ferrari | Ferrari 860 Monza | 192 | |
| 3rd | 14 | S5.0 | (United States) Bob Sweikert | (United States) Jack Ensley | Jack Ensley | Jaguar D-Type | 188 | |
| 4th | **27** | **S3.0** | (United Kingdom) **Roy Salvadori** | (United States) **Carroll Shelby** | **David Brown & Sons, Ltd.** | **Aston Martin DB3S** | **187** | |
| 5th | 24 | S3.0 | (France) Jean Behra (Italy) Cesare Perdisa | (Italy) Piero Taruffi | Officine Alfieri Maserati S.p.a. | Maserati 300S | 186 | |
| 6th | **41** | **S1.5** | (West Germany) **Hans Herrmann** | (West Germany) **Wolfgang von Trips** | **Porsche K.G.** | **Porsche 500 Spyder** | **182** | |
| 7th | 43 | S1.5 | (United States) Jack McAfee | (United States) Pete Lovely | John Edgar Enterprises | Porsche 550 Spyder | 179 | |
| 8th | 16 | S5.0 | (Cuba) Alfonso Gomez-Mena | (Cuba) Santiago González | Alfonso Mena | Jaguar D-Type | 176 | |
| 9th | **1** | **S8.0** | (United States) **John Fitch** | (United States) **Walt Hansgen** | Raceway Enterprises | **Chevrolet Corvette Special** | **176** | |
| 10th | **33** | **S2.0** | (Dominican Republic) **Porfirio Rubirosa** | (United States) **Jim Pauley** | **Porfirio Rubirosa** | **Ferrari 500 Mondial** | **172** | |
| DNF | 28 | S3.0 | (United Kingdom) Reg Parnell | (United Kingdom) Tony Brooks | David Brown & Sons, Ltd. | Aston Martin DB3S | 169 | Engine |
| 11th | 31 | S3.0 | (United States) Phil Stiles | (United States) George Huntoon | Ship & Shores Motors | Austin-Healey 100 S | 168 | |
| 12th | 11 | S5.0 | (United States) Briggs Cunningham | (United States) John Gordon Bennett | B. S. Cunningham | Jaguar D-Type | 168 | |
| 13th | 39 | S2.0 | (United States) Bob Ballenger | (United States) Phil Stewart | S. H. Arnolt | Arnolt -Bristol Bolide | 158 | |
| DNF | 8 | S5.0 | (United Kingdom) Mike Hawthorn | (United Kingdom) Desmond Titterington | Jaguar of New York Distributors Inc. | Jaguar D-Type | 162 | Brakes |
| 14th | 66 | S1.5 | (United States) Mike Marshall (West Germany) Huschke von Hanstein | (United States) Jan Brundage | Porsche KG | Porsche 550 | 158 | |
| 15th | 6 | S5.0 | (United States) Max Goldman | (United States) Ray Crawford | Raceway Enterprises | Chevrolet Corvette C1 | 157 | |
| 16th | **58** | **S750** | (France) **Paul Armagnac** | (France) **Guillaume Mercader** | **Automobiles D.B.** | **D.B. – Panhard HBR 5** | **155** | |
| 17th | 40 | S2.0 | (United States) Jim Peterson | (United States) Ted Boynton | S. H. Arnolt | Arnolt-Bristol Bolide | 154 | |
| 18th | 37 | S2.0 | (United States) Joseph Hap Dressel | (United States) William F. Woodbury | J. H. Dressel | AC Ace | 154 | |
| 19th | 50 | S1.5 | (United States) William Kinchloe | (United States) Stephen Spilter | Hambro Automotive Company | MGA | 151 | |
| 20th | 49 | S1.5 | (United States) David Ash (United States) John van Driel | (United States) Gus Ehrman | Hambro Automotive Company | MGA | 151 | |
| 21st | **55** | **S1.1** | (United States) **Leech Cracraft** | (United States) **Red Bryon** | **Cooper Car Co.** | **Cooper-Climax T39** | **147** | |
| 22nd | 51 | S1.5 | (United States) Fred Allen | (United States) Sid W. Blackman | Hambro Automotive Company | MGA | 139 | |
| DNF | 19 | S5.0 | (United States) Jim Kimberly | (Spain) Alfonso de Portago | Scuderia Ferrari | Ferrari 857 S | 137 | Valve |
| 23rd | 3 | S5.0 | (United States) Don Davis | (United States) Robert Gatz | Carl Beuhler III | Chevrolet Corvette C1 | 136 | |
| DNF | 67 | S2.0 | (United States) Jack Ryan | | John Ryan | Arnolt -Bristol Bolide | 108 | Out of fuel |
| DNF | 22 | S3.0 | (Venezuela) Chester Flynn | (United States) George Reed | Chester Flynn | Mercedes-Benz 300 SL | 126 | Camshaft |
| DNF | 10 | S5.0 | (United States) Bill Spear | (United States) Sherwood Johnston | Jaguar of New York Distributors Inc. | Jaguar D-Type | 127 | Value |
| DNF | 12 | S5.0 | (United States) Jake Kaplan | (United States) Russ Boss | Jake Kaplan | Jaguar D-Type | 120 | Brakes |
| DNF | 56 | S1.1 | (United States) Ed Hugus | (United States) John Bentley | Cooper Car Co. | Cooper-Climax T39 | 117 | Flat battery |
| DNF | 29 | S3.0 | (United Kingdom) Lance Macklin | (United Kingdom) Archie Scott Brown | Donald Healey Motors Co. Ltd. | Austin-Healey 100 S | 110 | Starter |
| DNF | 42 | S1.5 | (United States) Ed Crawford (West Germany) Huschke von Hanstein | (West Germany) Herbert Linge | Porsche K.G. | Porsche 500 Spyder | 108 | Wheel |
| 24th | 54 | S1.1 | (United States) M. R. J. Wyllie | (United States) Margaret Wyllie | Dr. M. R. J. Wyllie | Lotus-Climax Mark IX | 99 | |
| DNF | 30 | S3.0 | (United States) Roy Jackson-Moore | (United States) Elliot Forbes-Robinson | Donald Healey Motor Co. Ltd. | Austin-Healey 100 S | 90 | Engine |
| DNF | 35 | S2.0 | (United States) Mike Rothschild | (United States) George Hunt | Morgan Motors | Morgan-Triumph Plus 4 | 87 | Steering |
| DNF | 32 | S3.0 | (United States) Gene Greenspan | (United States) Bruce Kessler | William Greenspan | Ferrari 250 MM | 82 | Engine |
| DNF | 47 | S1.5 | (United States) Bobby Burns | (United States) Norman Scott | Allen Guiberson | Maserati 150S | 77 | Gearbox |
| DNF | 38 | S2.0 | (United States) S. H. Arnolt | (United States) Bob Goldrich | S. H. Arnolt | Arnolt -Bristol Bolide | 77 | Accident, steering |
| DNF | 15 | S5.0 | (United States) Lou Brero | (United States) Sam Weiss | A. A. Brown | Jaguar D-Type | 68 | Clutch |
| DNF | 9 | S5.0 | (United Kingdom) Duncan Hamilton | (United Kingdom) Ivor Bueb | Jaguar of New York Distributors Inc. | Jaguar D-Type | 63 | Brakes |
| DNF | 20 | S5.0 | (United States) Phil Hill | (United States) Masten Gregory | George Tilp | Ferrari 857 S | 61 | Bearings |
| DISQ | 53 | S1.1 | (United States) Warren Smith | (United States) Joe Sheppard | Joe Sheppard | Lotus-Climax Mark IX | 51 | Illegal repairs |
| DNF | 26 | S3.0 | (United Kingdom) Stirling Moss | (United Kingdom) Peter Collins | David Brown & Sons, Ltd. | Aston Martin DB3S | 51 | Gearbox |
| DNF | 63 | S1.1 | (United States) Ralph Miller | (United States) Harold Fenner | Ralph Miller | Lotus-Climax Eleven | 49 | Oil system |
| DNF | 2 | S5.0 | (United States) Troy Ruttman | (United States) Howard Hively | Howard Hively | Ferrari 375 Plus | 48 | Transmission |
| DNF | 25 | S3.0 | (Italy) Cesare Perdisa | (Argentina) Carlos Menditéguy | Officine Alfieri Maserati S.p.A. | Maserati 300S | 39 | Accident |
| DNF | 62 | S5.0 | (United States) Loyal Katskee | (United States) Roger Wing | Loyal Katskee | Jaguar D-Type | 39 | Accident |
| DNF | 64 | S3.0 | (United States) William Brewsterbill | (United States) Bill Rutan | William Brewster | Austin-Healey 100 S | 39 | Clutch |
| DNF | 59 | S750 | (France) Gérard Laureau | (United States) Hal Ullrich | Brooks Stevens | D.B. – Panhard HBR | 36 | Clutch |
| DNF | 52 | S1.1 | (United States) Curtis Attaway | (United States) Ralph Parkinson | Robert Brown | Cooper-Climax T39 | 26 | Valve |
| DNF | 60 | S750 | (United States) Harry Kite | (France) François Crouzet | Harry Kite | D.B. – Panhard HBR | 25 | Accident |
| DNF | 7 | S5.0 | (United States) Ernie Erickson | (United States) Charles Hassan | Ernie Erickson | Chevrolet Corvette | 22 | Piston |
| DNF | 48 | S1.5 | (Argentina) Alejandro de Tomaso | (United States) Isabelle Haskell | Alessandro de Tomaso | Maserati 150S | 15 | Gearshift linkage |
| DNF | 46 | S1.5 | (United States) Bill Lloyd | (United States) Karl Brocken | William B. Lloyd | Maserati 150S | 13 | Gearbox |
| DNF | 57 | S1.1 | (Venezuela) Mauricio Marcotulli | (Venezuela) Ed Munoz | Touring y Automovil Clude de Venezuela | Osca MT4 1100 | 11 | Differential |
| DNF | 61 | S750 | (France) Jean Lucas | (United States) John Norwood | Ecurie Lafayette | D.B. – Panhard HBR | 8 | Gearbox |
| DNF | 34 | S2.0 | (Venezuela) Julio Pola | (Venezuela) Enrique Muro | Touring y Automovil Clude de Venezuela | Ferrari 500 TR | 8 | Accident |
| DNF | 5 | S5.0 | (United States) Dale Duncan | (United States) William Eager | Raceway Enterprises | Chevrolet Corvette C1 | 3 | Real wheel |
| DNS | 3A | S5.0 | (United States) Jim Kimberly | (United States) Ed Lunken | Jim Kimberly | Ferrari 735 LM | | Transmission |
| DNS | 21 | S3.0 | (United States) Paul O'Shea | (United States) Dick Thompson | George Tilp | Mercedes-Benz 300 SL | | Oil leak |
| DNS | 23 | S3.0 | (United States) Charles Wallace | (United States) Duncan Black | Jack Pry | Mercedes-Benz 300 SL | | Engine |
| DNS | 36 | S2.0 | (United States) John Weitz | (United States) Manuel Bos | Morgan Motors | Morgan-Triumph Plus 4 | | Accident in practice |
| DNS | 44 | S1.5 | (United States) Rees Makins | (United States) Frank Bott | Automobili Osca S.p.a. | Osca MT4 1500 | | Withdrawn |
| DNS | 46 | S2.0 | (United Kingdom) Colin Chapman | (United States) Len Bastrup | Lotus Engineering Co. | Lotus-Climax Eleven | | Accident in practice |
| DNS | | S5.0 | (United States) Fred Dagavar | (United States) Al Garz | Lillian Sands | Jaguar XK140 | | did not start |

- Fastest Lap: Mike Hawthorn, 3:27.2secs (90.347 mph)

=== Class Winners ===
| Class | Winners | | |
|---|---|---|---|
| Class B - Sports 8000 | 1 | Chevrolet Corvette Special | Fitch / Hansgen |
| Class C - Sports 5000 | 17 | Ferrari 860 Monza | Fangio / Castellotti |
| Class D - Sports 3000 | 27 | Aston Martin DB3S | Salvadori / Shelby |
| Class E- Sports 2000 | 33 | Ferrari 500 Mondial II | Rubirosa / Pauley |
| Class F - Sports 1500 | 41 | Porsche 500 Spyder | Hermann / von Trips |
| Class G - Sports 1100 | 55 | Cooper-Climax T39 | Cracraft / Byron |
| Class H - Sports 750 | 58 | D.B. HBR - Panhard | Armagnac / Mercader |

== Standings after the race ==
| Pos | Championship | Points |
|---|---|---|
| 1 | (Italy) Ferrari | 14 |
| 2 | (Italy) Maserati | 10 |
| 3 | (United Kingdom) Jaguar | 4 |
| 4 | (United Kingdom) Aston Martin | 3 |
| 5= | (West Germany) Mercedes-Benz | 1 |
| | (West Germany) Porsche | 1 |

- Note: Only the top five positions are included in this set of standings.

Championship points were awarded for the first six places in each race in the order of 8-6-4-3-2-1. Manufacturers were only awarded points for their highest finishing car with no points awarded for positions filled by additional cars. Only the best 3 results out of the 5 races could be retained by each manufacturer. Points earned but not counted towards the championship totals are listed within brackets in the above table.

World Sportscar Championship
| Previous race: 1000 km Buenos Aires | 1956 season | Next race: Mille Miglia |
