= Chevrolet Corvette SS =

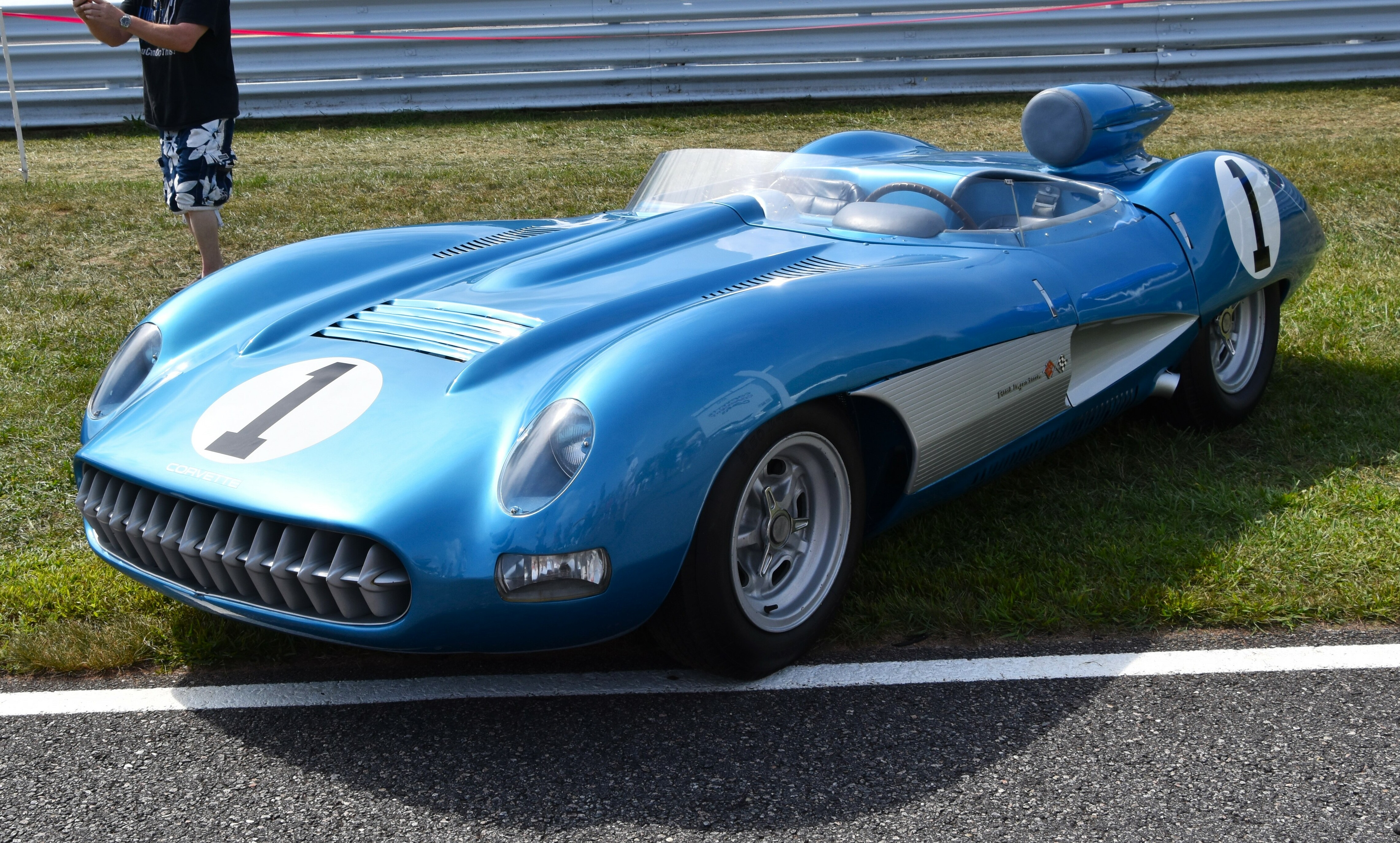

Overview
- Manufacturer: Chevrolet (General Motors)
- Also called: XP-64
- Production: 1957
- Designer: Clare MacKichan

Body and chassis
- Body style: Roadster
- Layout: Front-engine, rear-wheel-drive layout

Powertrain
- Engine: 283 cu in (4.6 L)
- Transmission: 4-speed manual

Dimensions
- Wheelbase: 92.0 in (2,337 mm)
- Length: 168 in (4,267 mm)
- Curb weight: 1,850 lb (839 kg)

Chronology
- Predecessor: Chevrolet Corvette SR-2
- Successor: XP-87 Stingray racer

The Chevrolet Corvette SS is a sports racing car built by Chevrolet in 1957. The car raced once at the 1957 12 Hours of Sebring before Chevrolet withdrew from all racing activities in response to a ban that year by the Automobile Manufacturers Association for all of its member companies, which included GM.

== History ==
By the mid-1950s GM engineer and future Director of High Performance Zora Arkus-Duntov was convinced that publicity from Corvette racing victories would increase sales of the car. Duntov took a team of three Corvettes to Daytona Speedweeks in February 1956; two cars that were essentially stock and one modified car. John Fitch won the Sports Car division in one of the stock Corvettes, and Betty Skelton took second place in the other, while Duntov won the Modified Sports Car division in the modified car. Four Corvettes, all with the new SR package and one with additional modifications including an enlarged engine, appeared in the 1956 12 Hours of Sebring. Duntov declined to participate, so Fitch acted as Team Manager. General Manager of Chevrolet Ed Cole, watching the 1956 Sebring race, realized that only a Corvette built specifically for racing stood a chance of winning against the international competition. Two other racing Corvettes called SR-2s were built, one car for Jerry Earl, son of Harley Earl, the head of GM's Art and Color Section, and a second car for Bill Mitchell.

At the New York Auto Show in December 1956 Chevrolet debuted the 1957 Corvette Super Sport, a show car based on a production Corvette with the latest engine and some features first seen on the SR and SR-2 racing cars.

Harley Earl brought Jack Ensley's Jaguar D-Type into GM's Research Studio. He instructed the team to convert the car to left-hand drive, install a Chevrolet V8 engine, and restyle the car incorporating styling cues from the production Corvette. Work on the D-Type conversion started May 1956. Engineers working on the conversion identified several problems with Earl's idea, leading to the conversion being abandoned, and the project moving in another direction. Some suggest that the entire D-Type episode was a ruse by Earl to get Duntov committed to the project.

The redirected project received GM designation XP-64, with approval given in August 1956 to ready two cars to race at Sebring in six months time. The ultimate goal was to race the car in the 24 Hours of Le Mans. GM designer Clare MacKichan headed up the team designing the bodywork. Also on the design team were Robert Cumberford and Anatole Lapine. Some references include Bob Cadaret in this group. Although the Jaguar was gone, its shape influenced MacKichan's design.

Development of the car's chassis, drivetrain and running gear took place in Duntov's skunkworks shop at GM. At Lapine's suggestion, a Mercedes-Benz 300 SL was obtained, put up on stands and the body removed. The Mercedes' chassis was cut and modified to accept a new small-block V8 drivetrain and new rear suspension of Duntov's design. This first chassis was used to create a development mule that would receive a fiberglass body. That frame was also used as a template for building all subsequent SS chassis.

The official name for Project XP-64 was the Corvette SS. This was the first Chevrolet to wear the "SS" badge. When Cole announced the car, it was described as an engineering project researching various features to improve both performance and safety.

The Corvette SS was Chevrolet's first purpose-built race car. It was considered the successor to the three "SR" cars that raced at 1956 in Sebring, and the two SR-2 Corvettes, which were based on a production Corvette chassis.

Two cars were completed; the development car called the "mule", and a full-spec Corvette SS. Three additional Corvette SS chassis were built, but not turned into complete cars. Some references report that Mitchell later bought the complete development mule for just US$1 as the base for his Stingray racer. In interviews Shinoda and Mitchell both describe Mitchell buying a spare SS chassis for US$500. He estimated the value of the chassis at US$500,000.

After its career ended, the Corvette SS remained in storage at various locations within GM until Duntov convinced John DeLorean, Chevrolet's new general manager, to donate the car to the Indianapolis Motor Speedway.

In 2006 a plan was made to apply the Corvette SS name to a special version of the C6 Corvette. This enhanced Corvette was eventually released as the Corvette ZR1.

In late February 2025, the Corvette SS was sold at auction by RM Sotheby's in Miami, Florida for US$7.7 Million, making it the highest ever sale price for a Corvette to date. This was double the previous record of US$3.85 Million set for an L88-powered 1967 C2 Corvette set in August 2024.

== Features ==
The chassis for the Corvette SS is a tubular steel space-frame unit inspired by that of the Mercedes-Benz 300 SL.

The full-spec car has a body made of magnesium, rather than the fiberglass used by production Corvettes. The mule had a fiberglass body. A transparent bubble top was also produced for the car, but was not used when racing.

Front suspension is by short-long arms with coil springs over tubular shock absorbers. At the rear is a De Dion tube with two pairs of trailing arms and coil over shocks.

The engine in the Corvette SS is a production Chevrolet small block V8 that displaces 283 cu in (4,640 cc). It is fitted with Rochester Ramjet fuel injection. 9.0:1 compression aluminum cylinder heads and a deep-sump oil pan made of magnesium are used. The camshaft is a special “Duntov” profile solid-lifter piece. The exhaust system uses the 40 in (1,016 mm) tuned-length headers developed for the SR2. Power output is 310 hp (231.2 kW) and 295 lb⋅ft (400.0 N⋅m).

The transmission is a close ratio four-speed Borg Warner manual with an aluminum alloy case.

The differential is a Halibrand quick-change unit. Depending on the gearset installed, top speed is between 143 and 180 mph (230.1 and 289.7 km/h).

The brakes are twin-leading-shoe Center-Plane mechanisms from Chrysler with a custom GM designed Al-Fin drum made up of an iron face and inner surface and finned aluminum cover. Heat transfer was increased by flowing aluminum through over 100 holes drilled in the iron drum. The brakes are inboard at the rear.

Overall weight for the complete car is 1,850 lb (839.1 kg).

== Technical data ==
Chevrolet Corvette SS:	Detail
Engine:	Chevrolet small-block V8
Displacement:	283 cu in (4,640 cc)
Bore × Stroke:	3.875 in × 3.000 in (98 mm × 76 mm)
Maximum power:	310 hp (231.2 kW) at 6000 rpm
Maximum torque:	295 ft⋅lb (400.0 N⋅m) at 4400 rpm
Compression ratio:	9.0:1 (11.0:1 optional)
Valvetrain:	Single cam-in-block, pushrods, 2 overhead valves per cylinder
Induction:	Rochester constant-flow mechanical fuel-injection
Cooling:	Water-cooled
Transmission:	4-speed manual
Differential:	Halibrand quick-change
Steering:	Saginaw recirculating ball — 2.5 turns lock-to-lock
Brakes f/r:	Drum/drum
Suspension front:	Short-long arms (SLA) with coil springs over tubular Delco shock absorbers, anti-roll bar
Suspension rear:	De Dion tube, four trailing arms, coil springs over tubular Delco shock absorbers
Body/Chassis:	Magnesium body (fiberglass body on development mule); Tubular steel space frame chassis
Track f/r:	51.5 / 51.5 in (1,308 / 1,308 mm)
Wheelbase:	92 in (2,337 mm)
Wheels:	Halibrand cast magnesium, 5.00-15 with knock-off hubs
Tires f/r:	Firestone Super Sports 6.50-15/7.60-15
Length; Width; Height:	168 in (4,267 mm) ——— 48.7 in (1,237 mm)
Weight:	1,850 lb (839.1 kg)
Maximum speed:	

== Motorsports ==
Duntov had originally signed Juan Manuel Fangio and Carroll Shelby to drive the car at Sebring in 1957, but both asked to be released from their contracts, so Fitch and Piero Taruffi were substituted on short notice. In practice, and driving the mule rather than the full-spec SS, Fitch managed a lap time of 3:32, while Taruffi turned in a time of 3:35 in the same car. Duntov persuaded both Stirling Moss and Fangio to try the mule in practice, and they turned in times of 3:28.2 and 3:27.2 respectively. Late Friday Fitch did a few laps in the magnesium-bodied SS, and found that while the fiberglass body of the mule insulated the driver from heat produced by the engine, the magnesium body provided no such protection, allowing the heat into the interior unimpeded. He also encountered problems with the brakes on the car. Parts from the mule were swapped over to the SS.

For the race, the starting grid was determined by engine displacement, so the SS started in the number one position. Fitch was in the car for the Le Mans start. After the third lap he pitted to have two front tires replaced, then turned in a lap time of 3:29.8; the fastest lap the SS would achieve. Fitch later pitted to have first a coil wire, then the coil itself, replaced. The car began to overheat. Then the bushings tying the rear lower trailing arms to the chassis split due to having been installed improperly. Fitch retired the SS after 23 laps.

In April 1957, the Automobile Manufacturers Association (AMA) voted to enact a ban on motor racing for all of its member companies, which included GM. The ban went into effect on 1 June, and GM accordingly withdrew the SS from further racing. The drivers that had been arranged for the 1957 Le Mans did not learn of the withdrawal until a month and a half after Sebring." For 1958 the Fédération Internationale de l'Automobile (FIA) reduced the maximum displacement limit to 3.0 liters for sports cars, effectively disqualifying the Corvette SS from any future European events.

At the opening of the Daytona Motor Speedway in 1959, Duntov took the SS out on the track and set fastest lap with a speed of 155 mph (249.4 km/h).
