= Corvette Stingray (concept car) =

Corvette Stingray Racer

Overview
- Manufacturer: Chevrolet (General Motors)
- Also called: XP-87
- Designer: Bill Mitchell; Pete Brock; Chuck Pohlmann; Larry Shinoda

Body and chassis
- Class: Sports car
- Body style: Roadster
- Layout: F/R
- Platform: Corvette SS

Powertrain
- Engine: 283 cu in (4.6 L) V8
- Transmission: 4-speed manual

Dimensions
- Wheelbase: 92 in (2,337 mm)
- Length: 175 in (4,445 mm)
- Curb weight: 2,154–2,000 lb (977.0–907.2 kg) (dry)

Chronology
- Predecessor: Chevrolet Corvette SS

The Corvette Stingray Racer is a sports racing car and concept car that debuted in 1959. The car was developed in the styling studios at General Motors (GM) at the behest of Bill Mitchell, GM Vice President of styling. The design was based on a sketch by designer Pete Brock, and was further developed by Larry Shinoda. The car strongly influenced the styling of the second generation (C2) Corvette Sting Ray.

== History ==
=== Italian influence ===
In 1957, Mitchell attended the Turin Auto Show in Italy. While there he was impressed by a series of automobiles whose body shapes shared a strong horizontal bodyline encircling the car, and four bulges or "blips" on the upper body, one above each wheel. Among these cars was the Abarth 750 Streamliner, as well as other Abarths, and cars with bodies by Boano and Stanguellini. Also influential was the Alfa Romeo Disco Volante, already several years old by the time of Mitchell's visit.

=== Q-Corvette ===
In the mid to late 1950s, Ed Cole, General Manager for Chevrolet, initiated a project called the Q-Chevrolet, a defining feature of which was to be a front-mounted engine and a rear-mounted transaxle. The Corvette development team began working on a Q-Corvette.

Mitchell showed pictures of cars seen on his Italian trip to his design team headed by Bob Veryzer to illustrate his goals for the shape of the Q-Corvette. The design was determined by an internal competition, which was won by a sketch done by Brock. Brock was tasked with developing his sketch into a complete design for a coupe, while designer Chuck Pohlmann was given the same assignment, but for a convertible. Brock's coupe was assigned project number XP-84, while Pohlmann's convertible was XP-96. While both were based on Brock's original sketch, the designs diverged in some details in addition to their different roof lines. Full-size clay models of both were built by modeler John Bird. At this time Larry Shinoda was brought in to refine the design, adding details that would be needed if the car went into production. As the Q-Corvette was being readied to be presented to GM's board of directors, Frederic Donner replaced Harlow Curtice as chairman of GM. Donner's focus on improving profitability by cutting costs meant the end of expensive engineering projects. When the Q-Chevrolet project was cancelled, the Q-Corvette was as well.

=== Corvette SS ===
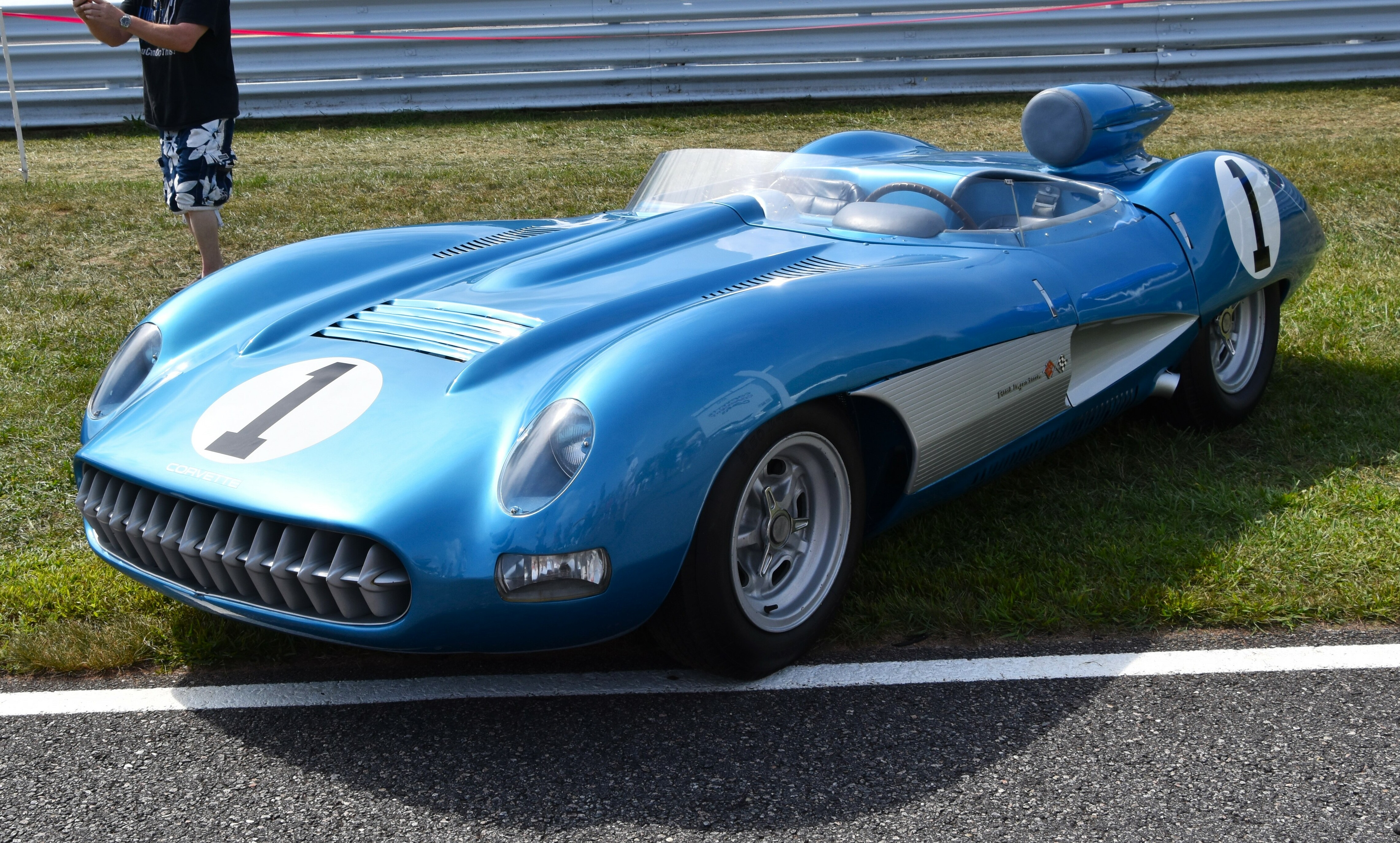
Chevrolet Corvette SS

The 1957 Corvette SS racing sports car was created by a team of engineers headed by Zora Arkus-Duntov as part of an official Chevrolet race effort meant to culminate with the 24 Hours of Le Mans. Soon after its race debut at the 12 Hours of Sebring, where it retired after 23 laps, the Automobile Manufacturers Association (AMA) banned manufacturer-sponsored racing, and the SS was relegated to test track duty.

The AMA racing ban notwithstanding, Mitchell was interested in building a new racing car, and used a Corvette SS chassis as its base. Some references report that he bought the complete Corvette SS development mule for one US dollar. In interviews Shinoda and Mitchell both describe Mitchell buying a spare SS chassis for US$500. He estimated the value of the chassis at US$500,000. Duntov tried to prevent Mitchell from buying the chassis, but was unsuccessful.

Inherited from the Corvette SS were the earlier car's tubular steel space frame chassis, 92 in (2,337 mm) wheelbase and 51.5 in (1,308 mm) front and rear track, front short/long arm suspension (SLA) and rear De Dion tube located by two pairs of trailing arms with coil springs over tubular shocks front and rear and drum brakes mounted outboard in front and inboard in the rear. The original Stingray engine appears to have been identical to the 283 cu in (4.6 L) Chevrolet small-block V8 engine with aluminum cylinder heads, a Duntov profile solid-lifter camshaft, and Rochester Ramjet fuel injection developed for the SS, but with an 11.0:1 compression ratio and slightly higher power output. The transmission was a Borg Warner 4-speed T-10 manual in a lightweight aluminum case. In the rear was a Halibrand quick-change differential. Wheels were also Halibrand magnesium pieces.

=== Design and development ===
Construction of the Stingray racer started in a small space at GM informally called the "Hammer Room". It was later moved to a slightly larger space that had once been Harley Earl's private file room. The car is considered the first product of Mitchell's Studio X, a small internal design studio he used for special projects. It also introduced what came to be called the "Folded Crease" style that became a hallmark of Mitchell's designs through the 1960s.

The body was based on the Q-Corvette XP-96 convertible. Shinoda headed up the effort to revise the shape and fit it to the Corvette SS chassis with its 92 in (2,337 mm) wheelbase.

The original body was made of 0.125 in (3.2 mm) fiberglass, with aluminum reinforcing and bonded in aluminum attachment hardware. Initial dry weight is reported to have been 2,154 lb (977 kg), roughly 1,000 lb (450 kg) lighter than a 1960 production car.

The car was complete in early 1959. Mitchell then wanted to take the car racing, but was told that he would have to do it at his own expense, and that the car could not carry any badging that associated it in any way with GM, Chevrolet or the Corvette name.

=== Motorsports ===
The Stingray made its racing debut on 18 April 1959 at the Marlboro Motor Raceway near Upper Marlboro, Maryland. Engine power was reduced to a more reliable 280 hp (208.8 kW). Driven by Dr. Dick Thompson it finished in fourth place overall, and first in its class.

During the 1959 racing season, the front and rear sections were remade in thinner 0.060 in (1.5 mm) fiberglass, with balsa wood reinforcement. This resulted in a 75 lb (34.0 kg) weight saving, but allowed the panels to flex. It later received a third, even lighter body. These weight reductions resulted in it weighing closer to 2,000 lb (907.2 kg) dry, or 2,360 lb (1,070.5 kg) wet.

On the track the car's body was found to generate excessive aerodynamic lift. Brock reports that the car's front wheels would lift at 140 mph (225 km/h). The rear springs were shimmed up to increase the car's rake to deal with the problem.

With Thompson as driver, it went on to win an SCCA National Championship in 1960.

=== Retirement ===
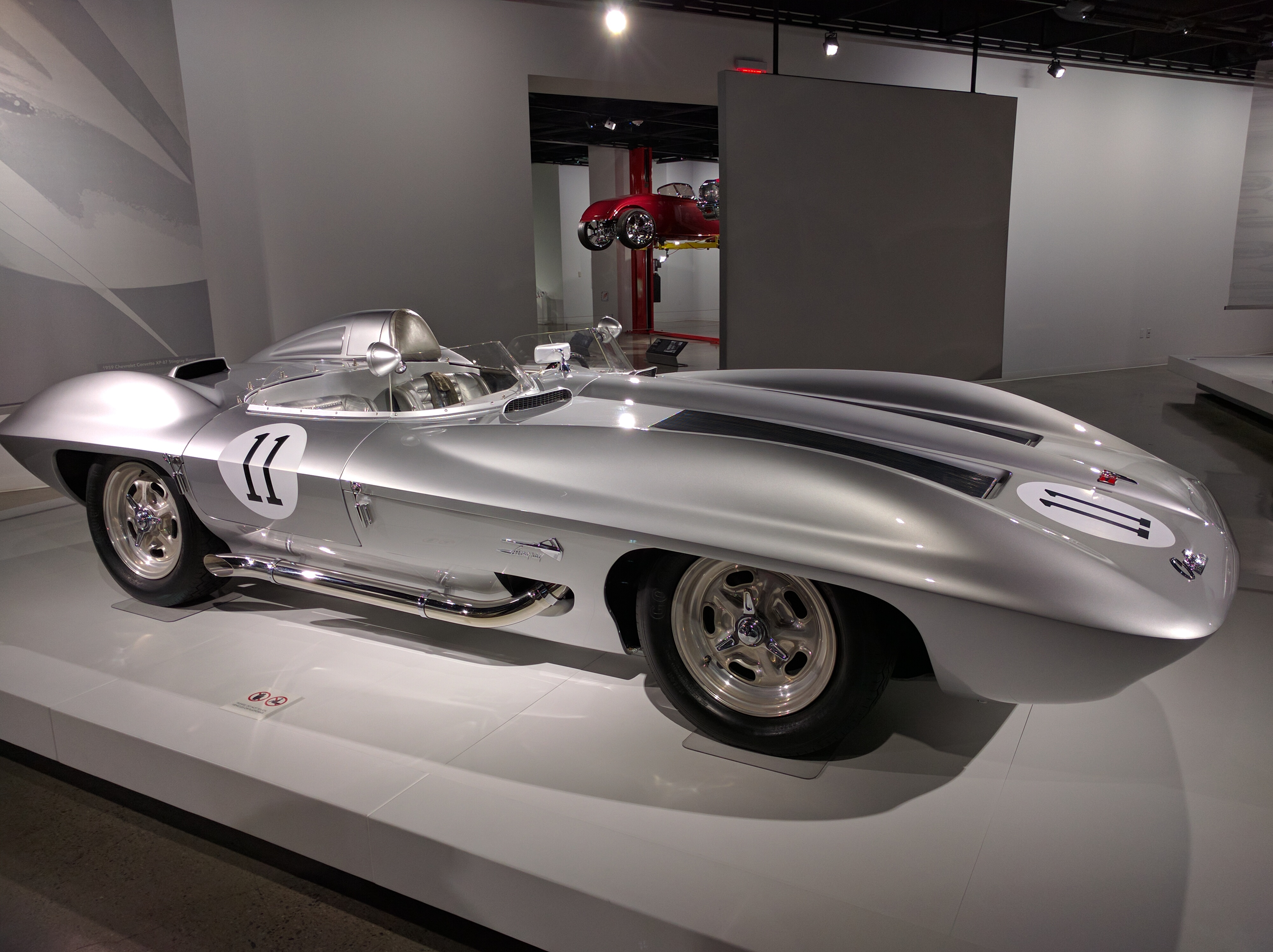
1959 Corvette XP-87 Stingray Racer on display at the Peterson Automotive Museum in Los Angeles, California, in July 2016

Even though it was raced as a private entry, Mitchell was pressured by GM to withdraw the car from competition in accord with the AMA ban. He eventually acquiesced, and the Stingray was retired from racing. It then underwent a series of modifications. Some of the changes requested by Mitchell included a full-width windshield and a passenger seat, making the car legal for use on public roads. This allowed Mitchell to drive the car on weekends as his personal vehicle. The modified vehicle was also exhibited as an experimental show car even while Mitchell continued to use it. After its career as a concept car was finished, it was retained by the GM Design Studio as a historically significant vehicle.

Another change reported to have been made to the vehicle was a conversion to Dunlop disc brakes. The engine is also said to have been swapped out for a 327 cu in (5.4 L) small-block V8 and, for a time, a 427 cu in (7.0 L) big-block V8. A news article from 2012 reports the car having a 350 cu in (5.7 L) small-block V8 with period-correct mechanical fuel injection.

The Stingray's body design influenced the style of the 1960 XP-720 prototype for the next generation C2 Corvette, which appeared in 1963. Its lines can also be seen in the Mako Shark I concept car of 1961.

The Stingray Racer has appeared in three movies; the 1967 Elvis Presley feature Clambake, the 2003 animated feature Hot Wheels: World Race and the 2014 feature Transformers: Age of Extinction.

The car was restored by GM Design Staff at the direction of Ed Welburn shortly after he became GM's vice-president of Global Design. It was featured at the 2013 Amelia Island Concours d'Elegance, and appeared there again in 2019.

=== Name controversy ===
There is an ongoing discussion about whether the car's name is "Stingray", or "Sting Ray".

While under construction, the car was officially the XP-87, or was simply referred to as "Mitchell's racer". No other name was apparently applied until Mitchell wanted to start racing the car, and was prevented from calling it a Corvette. An avid deep-sea fisherman, Mitchell chose the name of the stingray sea ray, whose streamlined body and undulating movements he admired. It is generally accepted that Mitchell used the single-word name "Stingray". This was reflected in the original badging used on the car.

When GM bought the car from Mitchell, they added the same badging that would appear on the 1963 C2 Corvette, and so the car officially became the "Sting Ray". This happened in 1961, the year the car appeared at the Chicago Auto Show with the revised name. Some original one-word badges were modified, with the original script piece being cut in two, but keeping the original capital 'S' and lower-case 'r'. In shows and printed material, the car became the "XP-87 Sting Ray".

Even though the car was renamed when it was bought by GM, there is still conflicting information on what the current owner considers the car's official name.

Some references refer to the car as the "Stingray Racer". This recalls Mitchell's original name for the car, rather than the name used to harmonize it with the 1963 production version.

== Specifications ==
1959 Stingray Racer:	Original specifications:
Engine:	Chevrolet small-block V8
Valvetrain:	Single cam-in-block, pushrods, rocker arms, 2 valves per cylinder
Displacement:	283 cu in (4,640 cc)
Bore × Stroke:	3.875 in × 3.000 in (98 mm × 76 mm)
Induction:	Naturally aspirated, Rochester constant-flow mechanical fuel-injection
Maximum power:	315 hp (234.9 kW) at 6200 rpm
Maximum torque:	295 ft⋅lb (400.0 N⋅m) at 4700 rpm
Compression ratio:	11.0:1
Cooling:	Water-cooled
Transmission:	4-speed manual
Differential:	Halibrand quick-change
Steering:	Saginaw recirculating ball — 2.5 turns lock-to-lock
Brakes f/r:	Drum/drum
Suspension front:	Short-long arms (SLA) with coil springs over tubular Delco shock absorbers, anti-roll bar
Suspension rear:	De Dion tube, four trailing arms, coil springs over tubular Delco shock absorbers
Body/Chassis:	Fiberglass body on a tubular steel space frame chassis
Layout:	Front-engine, rear-wheel-drive layout
Track f/r:	51.5 / 51.5 in (1,308 / 1,308 mm)
Wheelbase:	92 in (2,337 mm)
Wheels:	Halibrand cast magnesium, 5.00-15 with knock-off hubs
Tires f/r:	Firestone Super Sports 6.50-15/7.60-15
Length; Width; Height:	——— ——— ———
Weight:	2,154 lb (977.0 kg) (early dry); 2,000 lb (907.2 kg) (late dry); 2,360 lb (1,070.5 kg) (late wet)
Power-to-weight ratio:	7.0 lb/hp (4.3 kg/kW)
Power-to-volume ratio:	1.113 hp/cu in (50.6 kW/L)
Maximum speed:	

== Other models ==
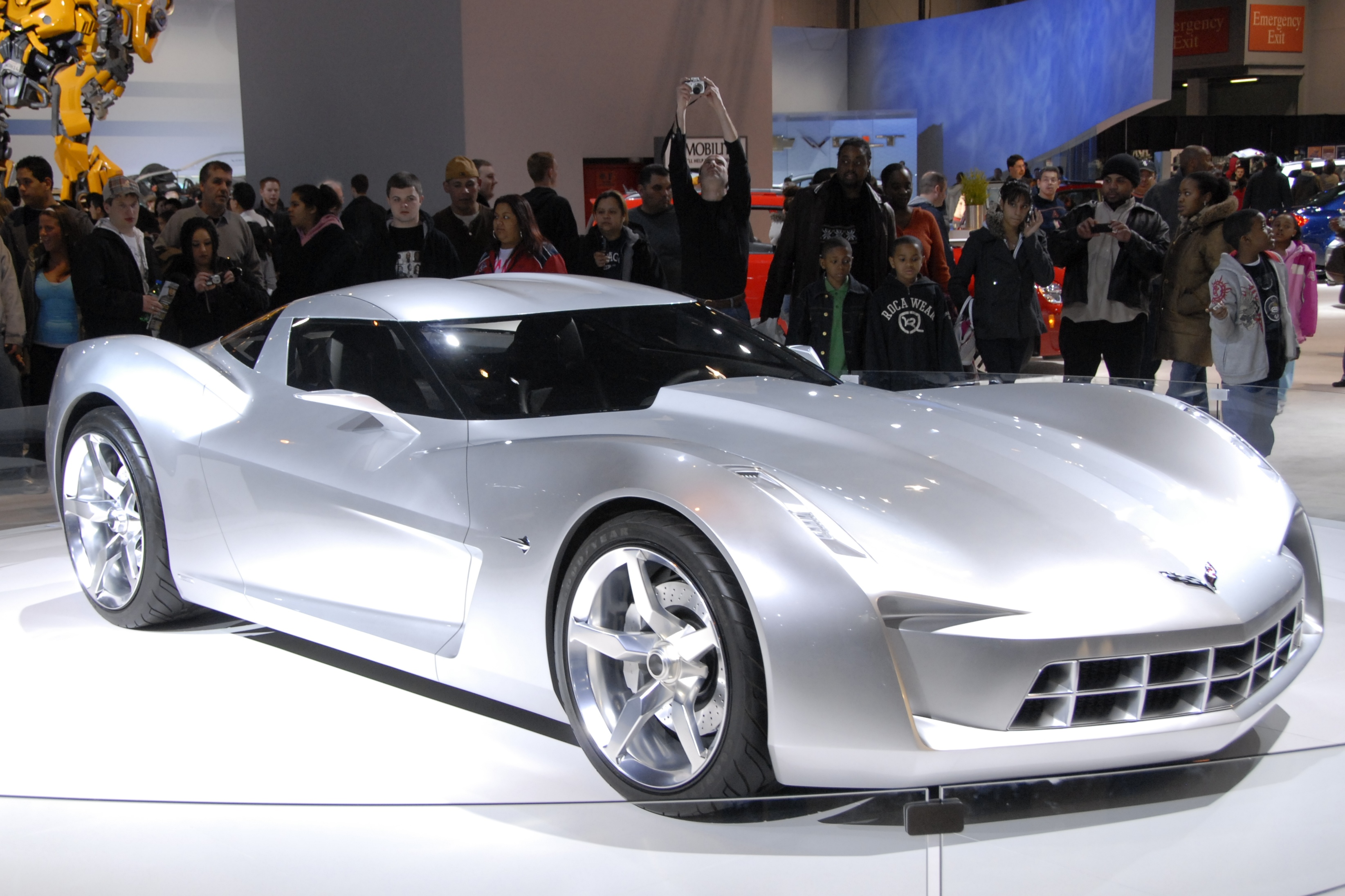
50th Anniversary Chevrolet Corvette Stingray Concept at the 2009 Chicago Auto Show

- 1963 Corvette Sting Ray — Written as two words, the badging used for the 1963 Sting Ray was retroactively applied to the Stingray Racer. The Sting Ray name would last throughout the C2's production life of 1963–1967.
- 1969 Corvette Stingray — After dropping the "Sting Ray" name from the Corvette in 1968, it returned as a single word in 1969 and would continue until 1976.
- 1992 Stingray III — This product of the Advanced Concept Center in California featured fixed seats with adjustable steering wheel and pedals, a pop-up rollbar, all-wheel steering and active suspension. While the early concept called for a high-output V6 engine, the running prototype received a 350 cu in (5.7 L) LT-1 V8 producing 300 hp (223.7 kW).
- 2009 Stingray Concept — The 50th Anniversary Stingray show car debuted at the Chicago Auto Show in February 2009. Also referred to as the Corvette Centennial, the car featured scissor doors, a hybrid drive system and advanced telematics. It was featured as the vehicle mode for Sideswipe in the 2009 film Transformers: Revenge of The Fallen.
- 2014 Stingray — Starting as a 2014 model year car first available in the fall of 2013, the C7 Stingray was sold in coupe and convertible forms. The Stingray model was available until the end of production of the C7 Corvette.
- 2020 Stingray — The mid-engined C8 Corvette continued use of the Stingray name.

== See also ==
- Chevrolet Corvette
