= William Helburn =

American photographer (1924–2020)

- Born: February 19, 1924; New York City, New York, U.S.
- Died: November 3, 2020 (aged 96); Connecticut, U.S.
- Occupations: Fashion and advertising photographer

William "Bill" Helburn (February 19, 1924 – November 3, 2020) was an American fashion and advertising photographer, best known for images published in magazines including Harper’s Bazaar, Vogue, Life, Town and Country, Esquire and Charm. Over the course of his career, Helburn won more than 46 professional awards for magazine and television ads. He died in November 2020 at the age of 96.

== Early life ==
William Helburn was born in New York City. He attended public and private schools in Manhattan and also took classes at The Art Students League of New York, before joining the U.S. Army Air Force in 1942. Helburn served in the Pacific theatre where he and future partner Ted Croner learned to make contact sheets and develop film, including the first pictures of the atomic bomb attack on Hiroshima.

== Becoming a photographer ==
Following the war Helburn and Croner resolved to become fashion photographers after Croner, on a weekend ski trip to Stowe, Vermont, encountered photographer Fernand Fonssagrives taking nude pictures of his model wife Lisa in the snow. After an encouraging visit to Fonssagrives studio, Helburn and Croner rented studio space in Manhattan and began taking pictures of aspiring models.

The two men soon enrolled in Harper’s Bazaar Art Director Alexey Brodovitch’s Design Laboratory, a workshop for aspiring photographers and graphic designers. While the partnership with Croner soon ended, studying with Brodovitch led to Helburn’s first major assignment as a professional, a ten-page editorial shoot in the March 1949 edition of Junior Bazaar (a supplement to Harper’s Bazaar).

== Helburn, Doyle Dane Bernbach, and the "Creative Revolution" in advertising ==
1949 also saw the launch of Doyle Dane Bernbach, the agency that would spark advertising’s creative revolution. While Helburn photographed for numerous agencies, he worked frequently for Doyle Dane, teaming with art directors including Robert Gage, Helmut Krone, and Gene Federico.

As an advertising photographer, Helburn shot for accounts including Oleg Cassini, Van Heusen, Cole of California, Supima Cotton, Cuddle Coat, Napier Jewelry, Ohrbachs, Volkswagen, DKW Auto Union, Cadillac, Chrysler, Buick, Polaroid, Coca-Cola, Revlon, Helene Curtis, Yardley, and Max Factor.

== Auto racing ==
After buying a Ferrari Testarossa, Helburn raced, either for Team Ferrari or as an independent, in events sanctioned by the National Sports Car Club of America (SCCA), Fédération Internationale de l'Automobile (FIA) and the Cuban Sport Commission, between 1956 and 1961.

In 1957, his most active year, Helburn raced eight times, with his team finishing second at the SCCA Regional Thompson, fifth in the Cuban Grand Prix and ninth in the Nassau Trophy Race. Helburn raced just once in 1961, finishing ninth in the Sebring 12-Hour Florida International Grand Prix.

== Later career ==
Helburn continued to work as a fashion and advertising photographer through the early 1980s. As his career as a still photographer declined, Helburn shot and directed television commercials for accounts including The Partnership for A Drug-Free America, Mobil Oil and Napier Jewelers.

=== Personal life ===
Helburn married model Sue Jenks in 1948 with whom he had two children, son Will and daughter Robin. After a divorce, Helburn married Ford model Angela Howard in 1965. The couple had one son, Chance. Following a second divorce, Helburn married his third wife, Susan Helburn, with whom he had son Hardy and daughter Brooke.

=== Professional awards ===
Helburn’s awards, include thirteen American Institute of Graphic Arts (AIGA) ‘Certificates of Excellence/Fifty Advertisements of the Year’ and three ‘Clio Awards for Advertising Excellence Worldwide.’

=== Exhibitions ===
Solo exhibitions

- 2015 “Seventh and Madison” Peter Fetterman Gallery, Santa Monica, USA
- 2016 “Ad Man” Staley-Wise Gallery, New York, NY USA

Group exhibitions

- 1997 "The Fords: 50 Years in Fashion" Staley-Wise Gallery, New York NY USA
- 2018 “Changes” Staley-Wise Gallery, New York, NY USA
- 2021 "The Reflected Eye: Fashion Through the Lens of the Photographer" Port Washington Library NY USA
- 2021-22 "Christian Dior: Designer of Dreams" Brooklyn Museum, NY USA
- 2022-23 "The Extended Runway: Expanding the Language of Fashion" Holden Luntz Gallery, Palm Beach FL USA
- 2022-23 "A Personal View of High Fashion and Street Style" Norton Museum of Art, Palm Beach FL USA
- 2023 "Mostly Nude" Hamiltons Gallery, London UK
