= Mike Rothschild =

American journalist

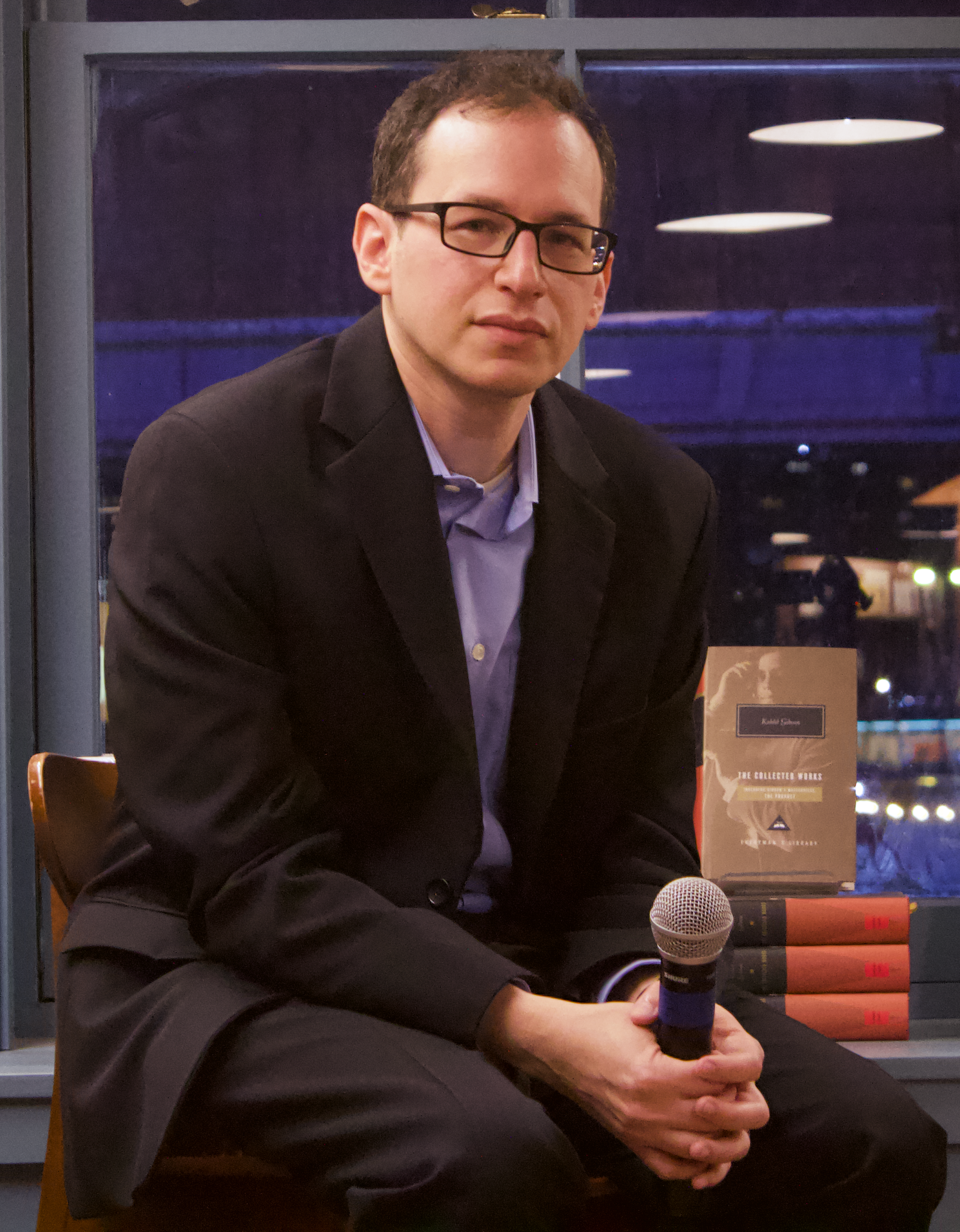
- Rothschild in 2023
- Born: United States
- Occupations: Journalist, non-fiction writer
- Employer: The Daily Dot
- Known for: Writing about conspiracy theories and paranormal beliefs
- Notable work: The Storm Is Upon Us (2021); Jewish Space Lasers (2023)

Mike Rothschild is an American journalist and non-fiction writer who specializes in conspiracy theories and paranormal beliefs. Rothschild has been interviewed as an expert by The New York Times, The Washington Post, and CNN, among others. Rothschild has been a frequent guest on radio shows, documentaries, and podcasts. He is a contributing writer for The Daily Dot. Rothschild has also testified before the United States Congress about election disinformation.

Rothschild's book The Storm is Upon Us (2021), which examines the QAnon movement, was published by Melville House Publishing. An updated edition was published in 2022. In 2023, Rothschild published Jewish Space Lasers, in which he discusses the Rothschild banking family and many of the conspiracy theories about world domination that have been put forward by them. He himself is not a member of the family. The title of the work was originally adopted by the media as a name for a conspiracy theory put forward by former congresswoman Marjorie Taylor Greene, according to which the California wildfires were deliberately caused by a space laser linked to the Rothschilds.
