= Arnolt =

Automobile manufacturer

S. H. Arnolt Inc.
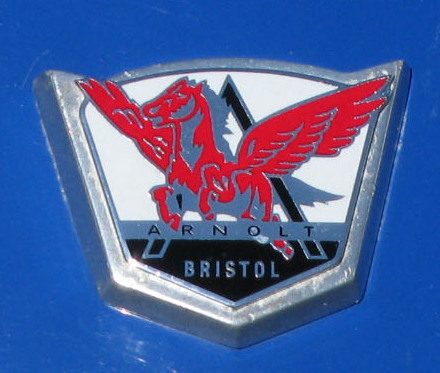
- Arnolt Bristol badge
- Industry: auto manufacturing
- Genre: sports cars
- Founded: 1953 in Chicago, USA
- Founder: Stanley H. Arnoly
- Defunct: 1968

In the automotive industry, S.H. Arnolt Inc. of Chicago and Warsaw, Indiana, sold four different manufacturer's cars with Bertone bodies during the period 1953 to 1968.

Stanley Harold "Wacky" Arnolt was a Chicago industrialist, who began importing foreign cars in the 1950s to the United States. Though sold as American cars, the cars were true hybrids, with British mechanicals, Italian bodywork, and U.S. sales and distribution, as well as in some cases final assembly and body work. S.H. Arnolt Inc. was a licensed automobile manufacturer in the State of Illinois.

A fortuitous meeting with Bertone at the Turin Auto Show in 1952 resulted in four collaborative efforts between Arnolt and Bertone, involving running gear and engines from the British car manufacturers MG, Aston Martin, Bentley, and Bristol.

== Arnolt-MG ==
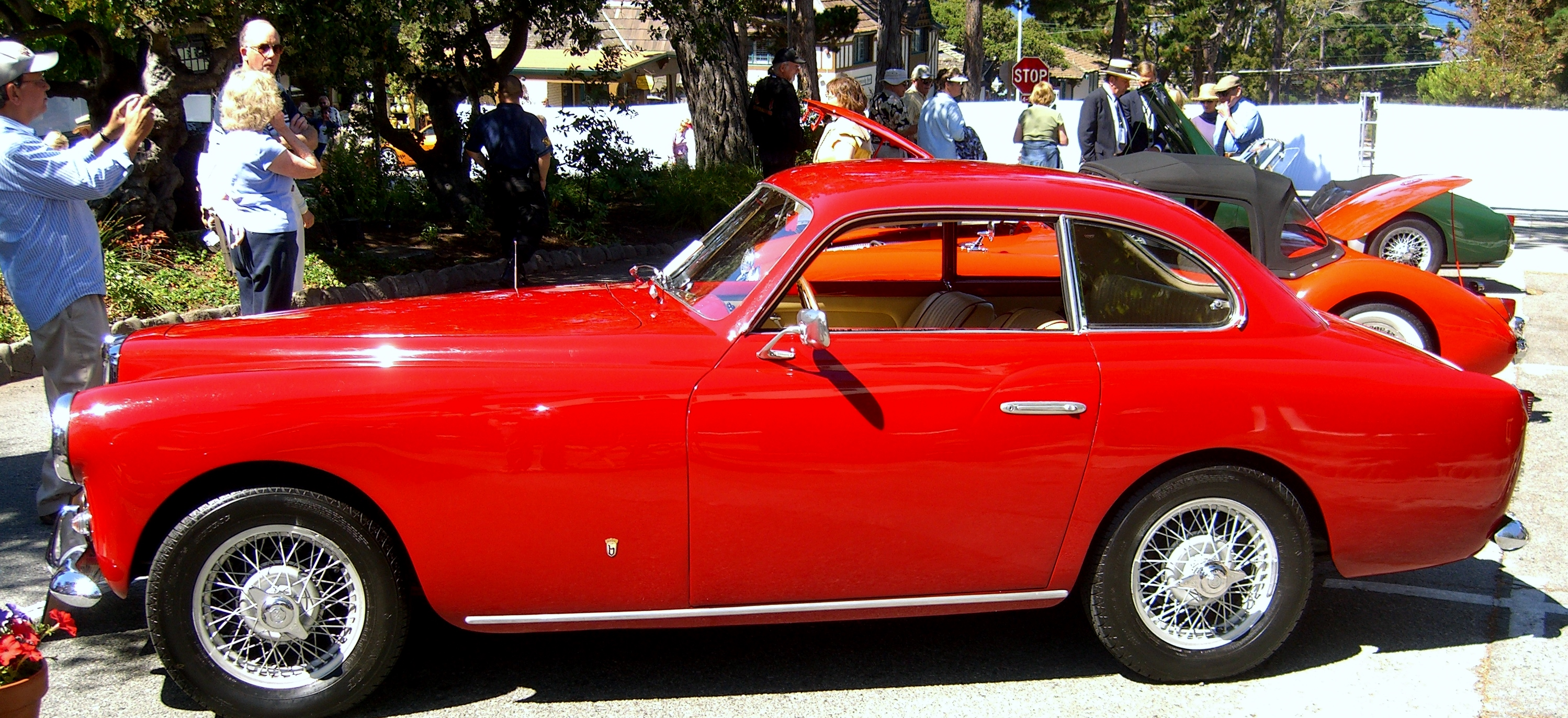
1955 Arnolt-MG

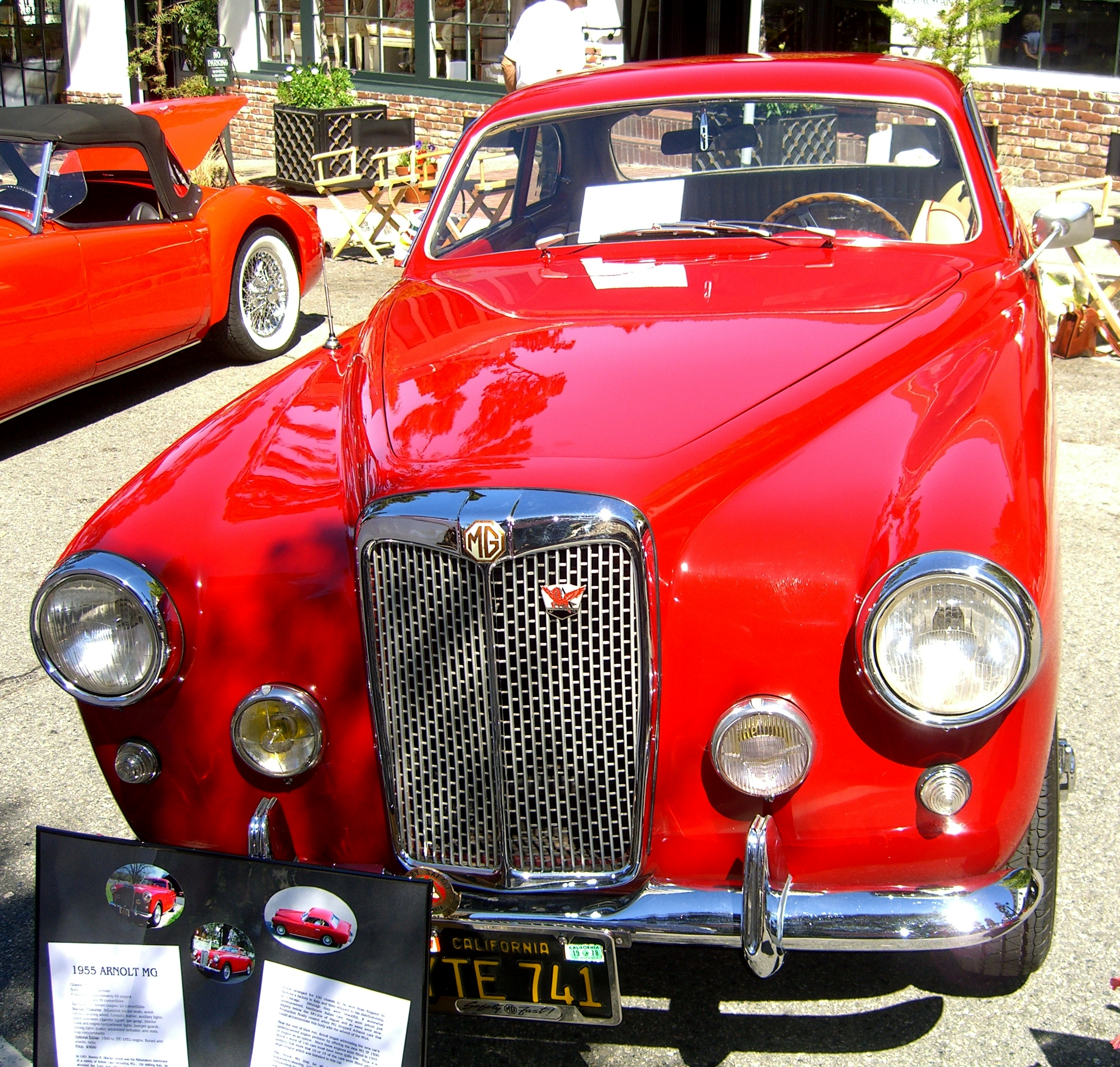
1955 Arnolt-MG

The Arnolt-MG is a four-seater Bertone-bodied car based on the MG TD chassis and XPAG 54hp engine. The car was styled by Giovanni Bertone, his son Nuccio, and Giovanni Michelotti. Of a planned production of 200 cars, 103 have been documented as built between 1953 and 1954 (67 coupés and 36 convertibles). Out of this total, the whereabouts of 36 are unknown and three are known to have been scrapped.

The initial price was $3145. In 1954, MG informed Arnolt that it could no longer supply chassis and engines due to demand for its own complete cars (as well as the replacement of the TD by the TF), so Arnolt began looking for a larger-engined car.

== Arnolt-Aston ==
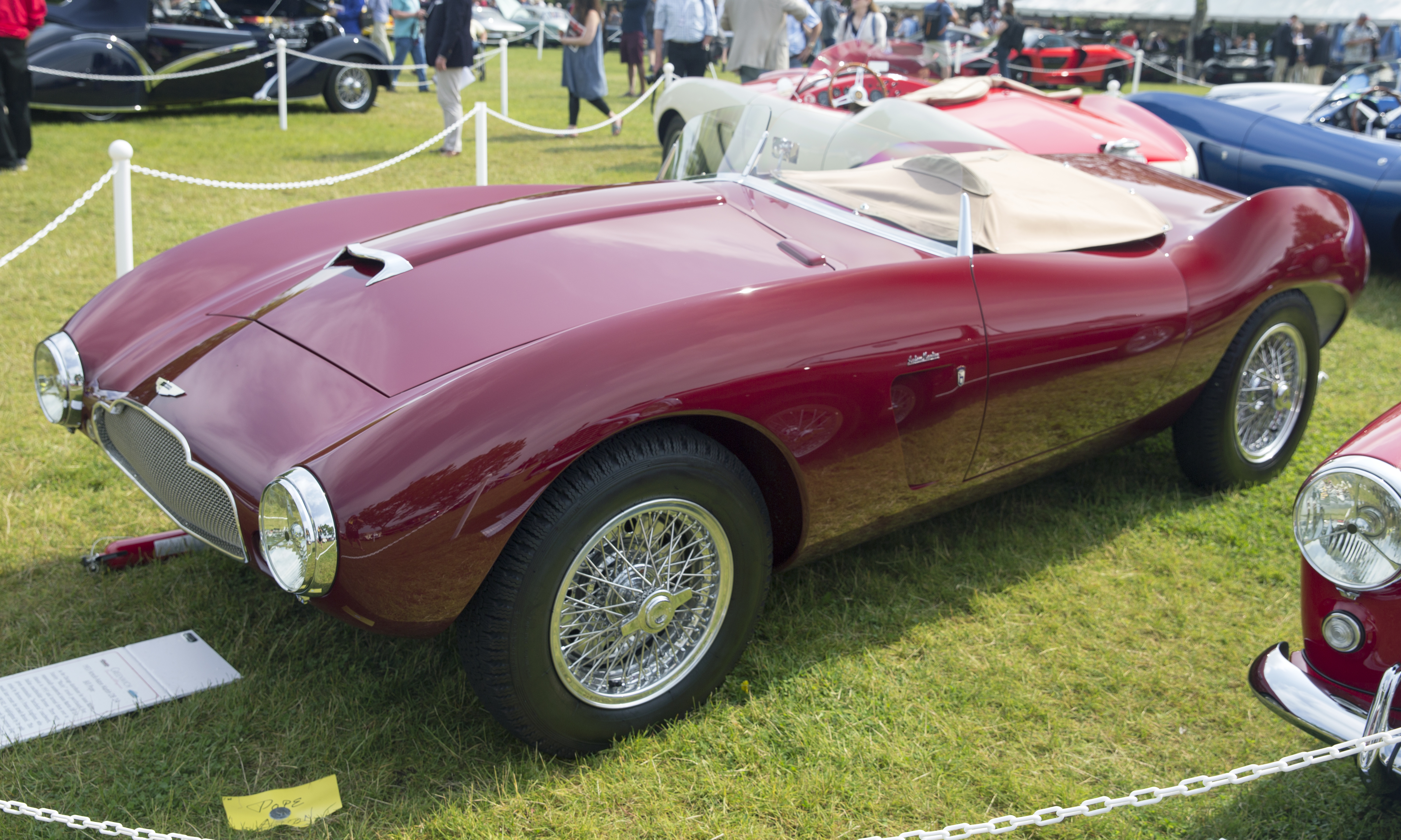
1953 Arnolt-Aston Martin DB2/4 Spyder (LML50/502)

An attempt to build a Bertone-bodied Aston Martin DB2/4 roadster and sell it as an Arnolt-Aston was stopped by Aston Martin after three cars were built. There were three Arnolt-Astons designed by Bertone's fresh new designer - Franco Scaglione (chassis numbers LML50/502, LML 50/505 and LML 50/507). All looked very much like Scaglione's subsequent Arnolt-Bristol, having sharply creased fender lines, and were open cars without hardtops. There were four additional Bertone Astons that were commissioned at Arnolt's request and went through Arnolt's hands. These four cars are sometimes mistakenly referred to as Arnolt-Astons, but are not. These were 3 roadsters and 1 coupe. All of the seven Arnolt-Astons still exist. One article refers to a possible eighth car, perhaps destroyed in the Chicago fire at Arnolt's factory. The cars were fitted with Aston's 125 hp, 2580 cc engine.

== Arnolt-Bentley ==
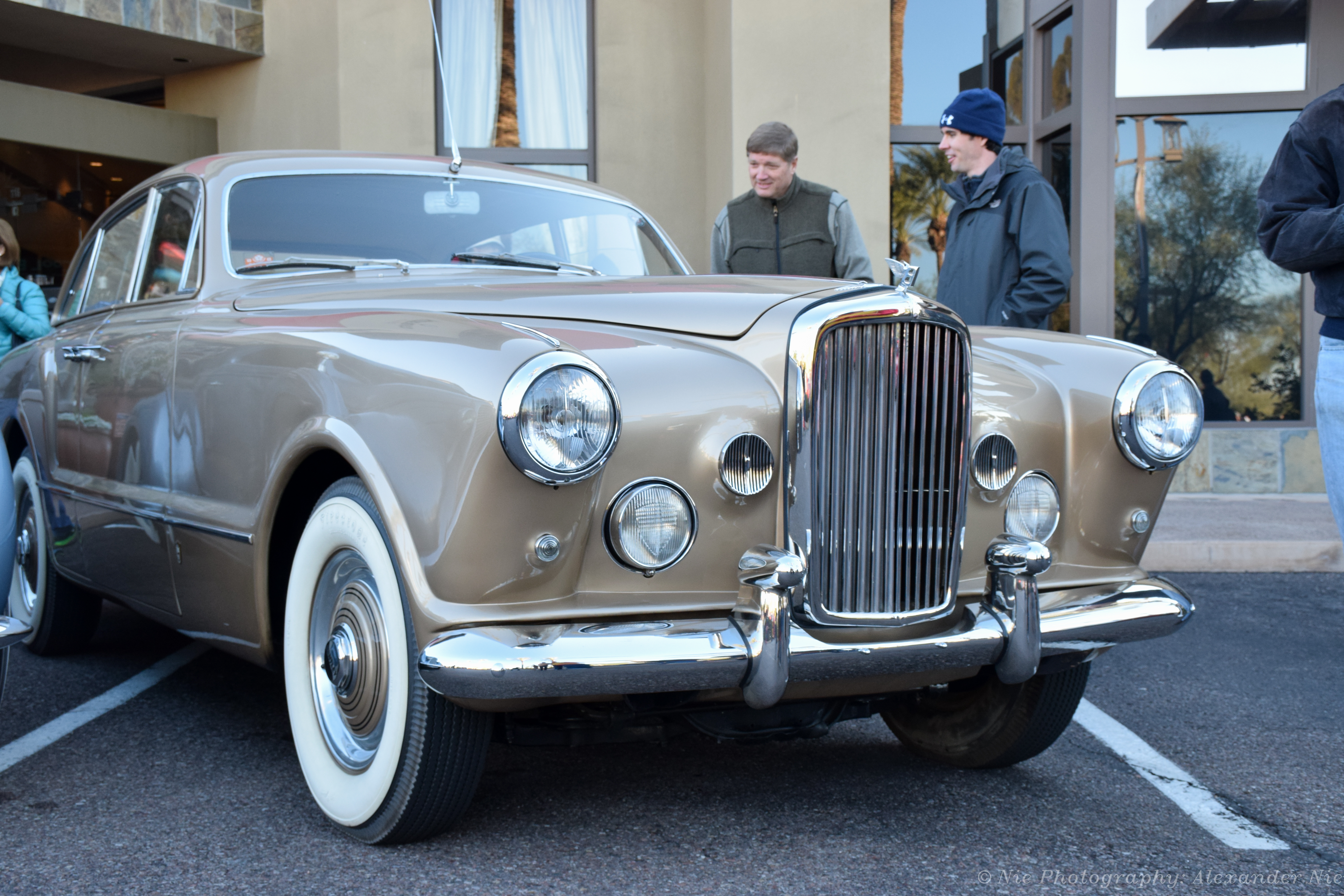
Arnolt-Bentley

Arnolt also had Bertone design and build a Bentley, which resembles a larger version of the Arnolt-MG Coupé because it was also penned by Giovanni Michelotti who was working for Bertone at the time. This car was commissioned for S.H. Arnolt as a personal car. Bertone built the body on a 1953 R Type Continental chassis. The car was fitted with monogrammed flasks and glasses, and a special cosmetics compartment for Mrs. Arnolt. The car was originally painted gold and fitted with tan hides.

== Arnolt-Bristol ==
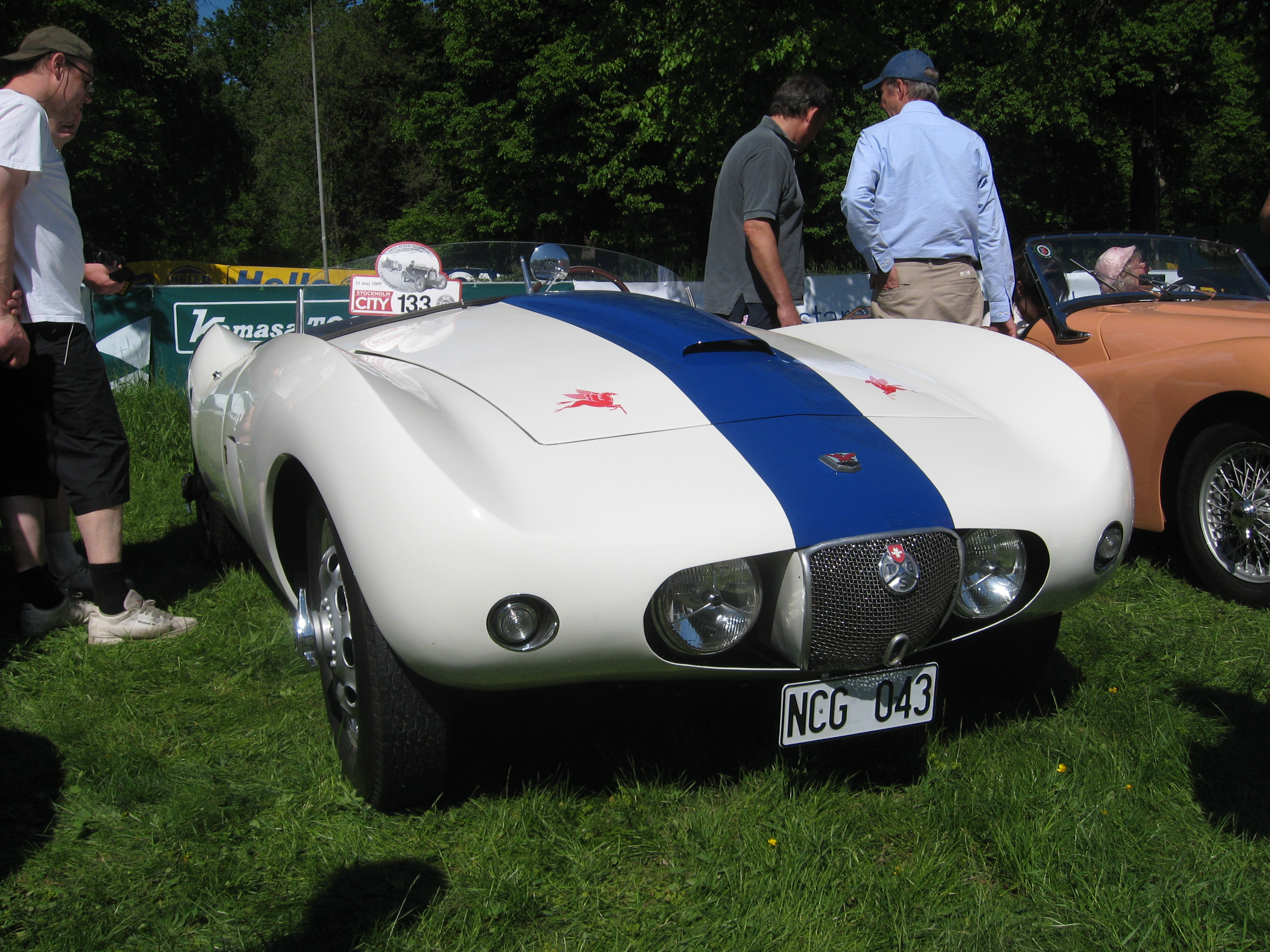
1954 Arnolt-Bristol

Arnolt then negotiated with Bristol Cars Ltd in the UK for the purchase of 200 of their 404-series chassis and the 1971 cc, six-cylinder 130 hp engines from the earlier 403 model. Arnolt needed to find a new chassis source to meet his obligation to Bertone, in whom he had invested heavily, after MG proved unable to fill the original order for 200 cars. The chassis Bristol supplied were sent to Carrozzeria Bertone where they received a highly aerodynamic body with a flowing design that allowed the minimal hood height to clear the cars' three single barrel Solex 32 carburetors. The bodies were designed by Bertone's new designer/aerodynamicist, Franco Scaglione (soon to be famous as the designer of the Alfa Romeo B.A.T. concept cars). The very tall Bristol engine created problems for designing a sleek-looking sports car. Franco Scaglione handled these with particular genius - first by incorporating a hood scoop to lower the surrounding sheet metal, and then by incorporating sharply creased fender lines out over the wheels to draw the eye's attention away from the unusually tall peak in the hood. A few design changes were requested by S.H. Arnolt.

Arnolt created a racing team for the Sebring 12-hour race, and in 1955, at their first attempt, the special lightweight cars finished first, second and fourth in the Sports 2000 class, winning the Team Trophy, a feat which was replicated in 1956 and 1960. The following year they took second and third in class. In 1957 the team withdrew after Bob Goldich's fatal accident on the first lap of his first stint in the car co-driven by Wacky Arnolt, while a privately entered Arnolt Bristol finished fifth in class. 1960 brought a final class win, finishing 1st, 2nd and 3rd in class, and placing 14th, 22d and 39th overall.

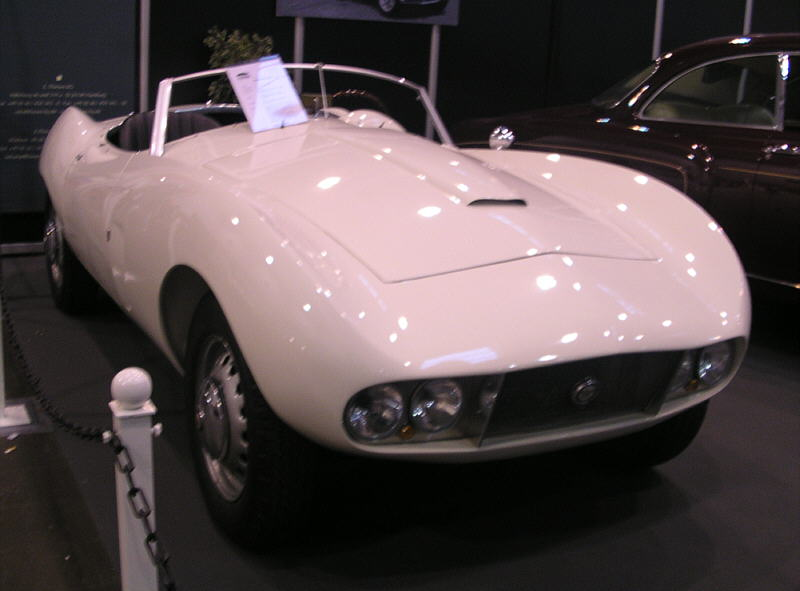
Arnolt Bristol deluxe (1958)

The cars were available in four body styles: competition—a stripped road racer; bolide—a slightly better-appointed road racer; deluxe—a better-appointed version of the bolide (side windows and convertible top, instruments mounted in a housing in front of the driver, glove box set in the dash); and coupé, with pop-up headlights. At least one open car was subsequently fitted with a removable hardtop by S.H. Arnolt. Prices as per a 1956 factory letter were $3995 for the competition model, $4245 for the bolide, $4995 for the deluxe and $5995 for the coupé.

Factory options for the Arnolt-Bristol included a front sway bar, remote shifter, 11-inch Alfin drum brakes, convertible top, bumpers, Borrani KO steel wheels (nine sets were sold, and one car was sold with Borrani wire wheels) and several different rear end gear ratios. A special racing fuel tank was installed in some of the race cars but was never offered for sale to the public. Late in 1959 and 60, the 12-inch bell-shaped Bristol drum setup was offered, and in 1961 Bristol front disc brakes were offered to retro fit to the Arnolt-Bristol. The majority of the cars had steel bodies, with aluminum trunk and hood.

The cars came with an owner's manual, spares manual and shop workbook, as well as a spare wheel and tire and complete tool kit. Additional items such as Arnolt key fobs, neck ties, ice buckets and Arnolt logo head scarves were available from the company. A wide variety of promotional literature, including brochures and postcards, was also produced.

All of the cars were originally sold with Bristol BS1 MkII six-cylinder engines; some have subsequently been fitted with other engines.

All Arnolt-Bristols were built between January 14, 1953, and December 12, 1959. The majority were built in 1954 and 1959. A total of 142 cars were produced, of which 12 were written off after a factory fire. The fire-damaged cars were used as a source of spares by Arnolt in later years. The total production included six coupés, and two aluminum alloy-bodied cars. One of the cars was originally right hand drive: the rest were all left hand drive. One of the cars never received a body, and was used as a rolling chassis for auto shows. This chassis is still in the possession of the Arnolt family.

Approximately 85 of the cars are still known to be extant, in conditions that vary from needing complete restoration to concours quality.

Despite the racing successes, the cars did not sell well.

Some of the cars did not sell until after 1960, and the last car to be sold, fitted with four headlights, remained unsold until 1968.

=== Common Misconceptions regarding the Arnolt-Bristol ===
A number of published sources have contained errors on the production numbers of the Arnolt-Bristol. In part, this may be because some authors production or sales figures have been compared to existing copies of the S.H. Arnolt sales ledger. This ledger only records sales of the cars in the United States. As a result, European sales were not included. One result is that several sources claim only three coupés were built, when there were in fact six: one was sold in France and the other two in Spain (the chassis numbers of all of which are recorded in the Bristol Owner's Club registry). At the Paris Auto Show in 1955, an up-and-coming actor, Lee Marvin, saw the Arnolt-Bristol coupé and purchased it. In later years, Marvin would win the Oscar for Best Actor, and after his death, his ultra-rare Arnolt-Bristol Coupé (the only Arnolt ever built with the coved front fenders that would also appear on the Corvette later in its C1 production run) sold at auction for $451,000.

A second misconception is that the Arnolt-Bristol cars were originally fitted with any engines other than the Bristol six-cylinder. All Arnolt-Bristols were originally sold with the Bristol engine; S.H. Arnolt did not fit any other engines. In later years, thanks to the spacious engine compartment, a variety of larger engines such as American V8s have been fitted to individual cars.

A third misconception is that S.H. Arnolt built the cars. The Arnolt-Bristol was built in Filton as a powered chassis; the body was fitted by Bertone in Italy, and only final assembly, fitting of options, prep work and (occasionally) paint and upholstery changes were done in Warsaw, Indiana.
