= For the Love of Cars =

British car restoration show

- Series 1 episode 7 title card
- Directed by: Jeremy Daldry; Tim Gaunt (Lotus special)
- Presented by: Philip Glenister; Ant Anstead
- Country of origin: United Kingdom
- Original language: English
- No. of series: 2 (1 special)
- No. of episodes: 16

Production
- Executive producers: Anna Beattie; Richard McKerrow; Sharon Powers
- Producers: Alice Brooksmith; Jamie Hammick; Sophie Lloyd
- Editors: Tim Coster; Chris Mallett; James Dowd
- Running time: 47 minutes
- Production company: Love Productions

Original release
- Network: Channel 4
- Release: 20 April 2014 – 20 November 2016

For the Love of Cars is a one-hour automotive show first broadcast in 2014 on Channel 4 in the United Kingdom. It is meant to show the character of quintessentially British and European cars through both the engineering and the social side of the car.

The show is presented by actor and car enthusiast Philip Glenister with designer and restoration expert Ant Anstead.

== Format ==
Each show begins with a quick discussion of the car that is to be featured in that episode. Some of the history, and why it is important to British motoring is covered. This is followed by Anstead attempting to locate one of these cars, typically through a barn find, to restore.

As the car is restored by Ant and his team at his car restoration company in Hertfordshire (Evanta Motor Co, although this is never mentioned in the show), Phil looks into the social side of the vehicles, meeting owners' clubs and attending events to get a feel for how the restoration should progress. Phil takes the lead in guiding Ant as to how he would like the restored project to look, but often has his mind changed through discussions with enthusiasts at events.

After the car is restored, Phil and Ant take it for a test drive before they are joined by several similar cars owned by car club members who give their opinions on the restored work. The car is then put on auction at the prestigious Coys of Kensington.

Starting with episode 2 of series 2, Phil and Ant pick up on other people's car restoration projects that have gone unfinished due to various reasons such as unemployment, declining health, or the untimely death of the restorer. Once the car is restored and placed on auction, all proceeds go to the previous owner for charitable purposes.

Series	Total purchase price	Total estimate price	Total auction selling price	Total TV selling price
Series 1	£64,500	£117,500	£182,000	£155,000
Series 2	£37,500	£118,500	£241,145	£209,750

== Series 1 ==
No. overall	No. in season	Vehicle	Purchase price	Estimate price	Auction selling price (TV selling price)	Original release date	UK viewers
1	1	"1972 Ford Escort Mark 1 Mexico"	£8,000	£16,000	£23,600 (£20,000)	20 April 2014	1,786,000
Work Completed: Replaced rusted panels on front end frame. Engine rebuilt. Sunroof panel replaced with a solid unit. Full body spray back to its original Sebring Red with black stripes. New wheels and interior. Original brightwork polished. Notes: Car was a project abandoned by the original owner.
2	2	"1950 Land Rover Series 1"	£6,000	£16,000	£41,000** (£35,000)	27 April 2014	1,432,000
Work Completed: Corrected imperfect repair on front end of frame. Body and frame repainted from light blue to green. Engine rebuilt. Seats reupholstered with the original fabric. All brightwork polished. Galvanised steel front bumper added. Notes: Previous owner imported the car from Tanzania and left it in a barn for 41 years. **The car set a world record for the selling price.
3	3	"1976 Triumph Stag"	£2,000	£10,500	£17,700 (£15,000)	4 May 2014	1,240,000
Work Completed: Replaced all dented and rusted body panels. Full body respray from blue to red. Engine rebuilt with cooling system properly installed to ensure that it is free from its trademark overheating problems. New seats and interior. Work completed by Triumph specialists Robsport International. Notes: Special guest expert Alexei Sayle
4	4	"1964 Austin Mini Cooper Mk 1"	£9,500	£20,000	£24,780 (£21,000)	11 May 2014	1,330,000
Work Completed: Engine cleaned, polished, and rebuilt. Full body respray to its original BMC Almond Green colour with Old English White roof. Instrument gauges restored. New seats, wooden steering wheel, and interior trim. New headlamps, wheels and tyres. Original brightwork polished. Notes: Special guest Stirling Moss. Car was purchased near Belfast, Northern Ireland, and was off the road for 12 years. Engine was tuned by Downton Engineering.
5	5	"1947 MG TC"	£16,000	£25,000	£28,320 (£24,000)	18 May 2014	1,230,000
Work Completed: New wooden frame made of English ash. New steel body panels. Non-original TD engine replaced with an original, refurbished engine. Radiator frame and headlamp housings re-chromed. New wire wheels and tyres. Full body respray from white to Clipper Blue. Aftermarket horn replaced with an original unit. Interior reupholstered with tan leather. New tan fabric hood. All brightwork except front MG badge polished. Notes: Car had not left a barn for over 40 years and was found with non-original engine and parts.
6	6	"1981 DeLorean"	£23,000	£30,000	£46,600** (£40,000)	25 May 2014	1,050,000
Work Completed: New clutch from a Renault Espace. Front suspension enhanced with strengthening plates welded to the arms. Dents removed and stainless steel body polished. Notes: Rare right-hand-drive variant converted from the factory shortly after DeLorean was declared bankrupt. The car was offered £37,500 for private sale prior to the auction but it was turned down. **The car set a world record for the selling price.
7	7	"Auction Day"	£64,500	£117,500	£182,000 (£155,000)	1 June 2014	1,739,000
Notes: The cars that had appeared in the episodes of this series were sold off at the Coys of Kensington auction.

== Series 2 ==
Unlike the first series, the feature car of each episode was shown being sold at auction at the NEC, Birmingham, at the end of the episode (instead of being sold at the end of the series). Starting from episode 2 onward, Ant is given the car for £0 by the owner to restore the car back to its original state; any money that is made at the auction is given to the owner.

No. overall	No. in season	Vehicle	Purchase price	Estimate price	Auction selling price (TV selling price)	Original release date	UK viewers
8	1	"1969 Aston Martin DBS"	£37,500	£70,000	£169,800** (£150,000)	19 April 2015	1,866,000
Work Completed: Stripped the car down to the bare metal to repair the rust and panel damage, reupholstered interior of the car with red leather and replaced the broken steering wheel. The exterior of the car was repainted in olive green as that was the colour of the DBS seen in On Her Majesty's Secret Service. The Vantage upgrade included the automatic gearbox being replaced with a manual version and new additional Weber carburettors. Notes: Ant had already purchased the car before Glenister had got to see it, the car was an original DBS. The decision was made to restore the car but to uprate it to the Vantage specification which was available when the car was in production. Due to Aston Martin's historic association with the James Bond film series, the episode's soundtrack consists mainly of James Bond 007 theme songs. **The car beat the previous world record of £96,500.
9	2	"1985 Rover SD1 Police Car"	£0*	£11,000	£11,505** (£9,750)	26 April 2015	1,595,000
Work Completed: Stripped the car down to the bare metal and catalogued everything in the car. Replaced the rear lights. Overhauled the engine and the clutch. Repainted the car with the standard white and reapplied the Police decals. Repaired the damaged and rusty panels, including repairing the doors due to them not fitting the cars frame correctly. Most of the body work restoration was completed by classic car restoration specialists S & J Body Repairs Ltd in Shepreth, Hertfordshire. Notes: Ant knew of a friend that was restoring an SD1 Police car but couldn't finish it due to health issues. This Rover SD1 was a one-off of the vehicle that was commissioned by the Grampian police force, and the winning bid came from the Grampian Transport Museum in Scotland, where their car was originally stationed. **The car beat the previous world record of £8,000 (standard SD1).
10	3	"1980 Volkswagen Golf GTI Mk1"	£0*	£6,500	£11,210 (£9,500)	3 May 2015	1,340,000
Work Completed: Stripped the car down to the bare metal and catalogued all the parts of the car. The car was given a new lease of life with a new paint scheme. Fitted all the rally spec requirements that were needed, including bucket seats, harnesses, roll-cage, hydraulic handbrake, upgraded steering and suspension. Two sets of halogen lamps were fitted to the front of the car. The engine was rebuilt by the owner. Notes: Ant knew of someone who had bought and started to restore the car but they had to stop due to their current health. The winning bid came from the father of the owner's wife who had bought the car to give back to the owner.
11	4	"1971 Fiat 500 L"	£0*	£6,000	£10,030 (£8,500)	10 May 2015	1,548,000
Work Completed: Catalogued all the parts of the car to see how much that there was that could still be used. The car was given a new lease of life with a new paint job in Azure Blue. Replaced the rusty floor and exterior panels with new panels. Tailor fit the new panels to the rest of the body. Fitted a new interior. Restored and replaced the windows, lights, handles and doors. Stripped down the engine, cleaned all of the parts and replaced the engine valves. Notes: Ant knew of someone that had bought the car as restoration project but they had to stop due to losing their job. The car was a left-hand-drive unit. The winning bid came from two classic car dealers to go in their car showroom.
12	5	"1972 Saab 96"	£0*	£7,000	£9,440** (£8,000)	17 May 2015	1,316,000
Work Completed: The car was stripped down and parts were catalogued. The car was given a new lease of life with new paint in the original period colour. The engine, suspension, brakes and hydraulics were all overhauled due to being unused for a long period of time. The interior seats were reupholstered in red leather with tartan trim. Notes: Ant knew of someone that had one of these cars but they never seen the restoration process through to the end due to unforeseen circumstances. The winning bid came from a property developer, who sold the car in another auction and made £15,000 which was later donated to cancer research. Because the episode focuses on the history of Swedish cars, the episode's soundtrack consists mainly of ABBA songs; the end credits theme is Roxette's "The Look". **The car beat the previous world record of £7,000.
13	6	"1970 Ford Transit Mk1"	£0*	£10,000	£11,210 (£9,500)	24 May 2015	1,295,000
Work Completed: The van was stripped down and sandblasted to reveal how bad the damage was. The van was given a new lease of life with new paint in the original white colour and the logo was repainted on the sides. Due to the van being in constant use over the years the rust had damaged all parts, Ant had to hand bend and weld bespoke panel pieces to the van. Notes: Ant knew of someone that had one of these rare vans but they never seen the restoration process through to the end due to the work being a lot worse than the owner had planned. The transit in question was also one of the rarer models with the Perkins diesel engine and bullnose front end. The Ford Transit was auctioned off at the NEC, Birmingham and the winning bid came from a man who also had a keen interest in the Transit van.
14	7	"1958 Volkswagen Beetle"	£0*	£8,000	£17,950 (£14,500)	31 May 2015	1,284,000
Work Completed: The car was stripped down to the bare metal to reveal how bad the damage was. The rusted panels were repaired. The car was given a new lease of life with a new retro grey paint job. The interior was reupholstered in red to contrast the grey exterior. The doors and windows were replaced and the engine was reconditioned and overhauled. Notes: Ant knew of someone that had one of these cars but they had never seen the restoration process through to the end as the owner's circumstances had changed. The winning bid came from a property developer.
15	8	"Auctioning off the cars"	£37,500	£118,500	£241,145 (£209,750)	7 June 2015	1,735,000
Notes: Ant and Philip look back at the vehicles that have been restored over this series, this includes showing the cars being auctioned off and what they managed to sell for. They also return to some of the owners that appeared in the first series.

== Specials ==
No. overall	No. in season	Vehicle	Purchase price	Estimate price	Auction selling price (TV selling price)	Original release date	UK viewers
16	1	"1958 Lotus Elite"	£40,000	£103,000	£121,500** (£108,000)	20 November 2016	1,275,000
Work Completed: Removed the 1970s green paint and put it back into its original 1950s colour, removed any filler repairs to bodywork, rebuilt the engine plus installed a roll cage, modern brakes, suspension, racing seats, fire extinguisher, modern cooling, modern fuel system, etc. Notes: The car's previous owner had planned to restore the car and then return it to the racetrack, the restoration however ground to a halt due to unforeseen circumstances. The car in question was also the actual vehicle which was displayed at the 1958 Earl's Court Motorshow. The money made from the sale was split three ways between Phil, Ant and the wife of the car's former owner. **The car beat the previous world record of £103,000 and selling for £121,500.

== Broadcast ==
In Australia, Series 1 first aired in 2014 on ABC. Series 1 also aired on subscription television channel Discovery Turbo, beginning on 17 July 2015. Series 2 premiered on 9Go! on 1 December 2015.
