= Jill McGown =

British writer

Jill McGown (9 August 1947 in Campbeltown, Scotland – 6 April 2007 in Kettering, Northamptonshire) was a British writer of mystery novels. She was best known for her mystery series featuring Inspector Lloyd and Judy Hill, one of which (A Shred of Evidence) was made into a television drama in 2001 starring Philip Glenister and Michelle Collins. McGown wrote her first mystery novel after being laid off from the British Steel Corporation in 1980. She is sometimes credited as Elizabeth Chaplin.

== Early life, education and career ==
McGown's family were from Campbeltown, where she was born in 1947. The family moved to Corby in England when she was ten, as the fishing industry in Scotland was declining.

McGown attended Corby Grammar School and Kettering Technical College. After leaving college, she worked as a secretary, but was made redundant from British Steel in 1980. She said

So there I was with my redundancy pay and a choice. I could look for another job in a town that had 25% unemployment, or I could take the opportunity to write a novel. I am not adventurous, but this adventure had been thrust upon me and I chose to write the novel.

Val McDermid wrote of her, "Her work was critically acclaimed, and many of her peers believe she never achieved the level of commercial success she deserved".

== Bibliography ==
=== Lloyd & Hill ===
- A Perfect Match (1983)
- Redemption (aka Murder at the Old Vicarage) (1988)
- Death of a Dancer (aka Gone to Her Death) (1989)
- The Murders of Mrs Austin And Mrs Beale (1991)
- The Other Woman (1992)
- Murder... Now And Then (1993)
- A Shred of Evidence (1995)
- Verdict Unsafe (1997)
- Picture of Innocence (1998)
- Plots And Errors (1999)
- Scene of Crime (2001)
- Births, Deaths and Marriages (aka Death in the Family) (2002)
- Unlucky for Some (2004)

=== Standalone novels ===
- Record of Sin (1985)
- An Evil Hour (1986)
- The Stalking Horse (1987)
- Murder Movie (1990)
- Hostage to Fortune (1992) (writing as Elizabeth Chaplin)
