= British Touring Car Championship =

Auto racing championship

Kwik Fit British Touring Car Championship
- Category: Touring cars
- Country: United Kingdom
- Inaugural season: 1958
- Classes: Manufacturers & Independents
- Drivers: 27 (2026)
- Teams: 8 (2026)
- Constructors: BMW, Ford, Hyundai, Toyota, Mercedes, Audi; Note: The constructors in bold are currently represented in the Manufacturers Championship.
- Engine suppliers: Turbocharged 2.0 litre I4
- Tyre suppliers: Goodyear
- Drivers' champion: (United Kingdom) Ashley Sutton
- Makes' champion: Ford
- Teams' champion: NAPA Racing UK
- Official website: btcc.net/

The British Touring Car Championship (BTCC), officially known as the Kwik Fit British Touring Car Championship for sponsorship reasons, is a touring car racing series held each year in the United Kingdom, currently organised and administered by TOCA. It was established in 1958 as the British Saloon Car Championship and was renamed as the British Touring Car Championship for the 1987 season. It is one of the oldest, most popular and most prestigious touring car series in the world. The championship, currently running Next Generation Touring Car regulations, has been run to various national and international regulations over the years including FIA Group 2, FIA Group 5, FIA Group 1, FIA Group A, FIA Super Touring and FIA Super 2000. A lower-key Group N class for production cars ran from 2000 until 2003.

== History ==
=== Early years ===
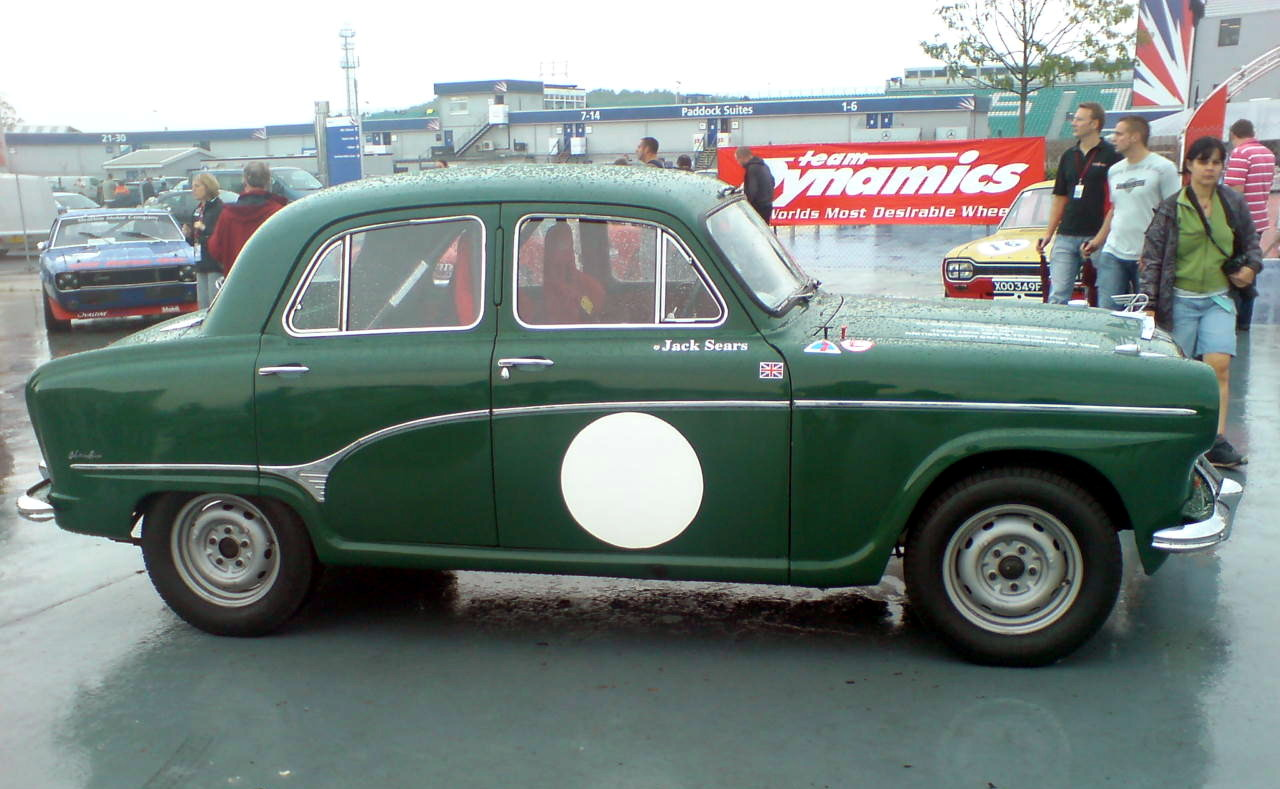
The Austin A105 with which Jack Sears won the 1958 British Saloon Car Championship

The championship was initially run with a mix of classes, divided according to engine capacity, racing simultaneously. This often meant that a driver who chose the right class could win the overall championship without any chance of overall race wins, thereby devaluing the title for the spectators – for example, in the 1980s Chris Hodgetts won two overall titles in a small Toyota Corolla prepared by Hughes of Beaconsfield, at that time a Mercedes-Benz/Toyota main dealer when most of the race wins were going to much larger cars; and while the Ford Sierra Cosworth RS500s were dominating at the front of the field, Frank Sytner took a title in a Class B BMW M3 and John Cleland's first title was won in a small Class C Vauxhall Astra.

=== Modern era ===
==== Super Touring cars ====
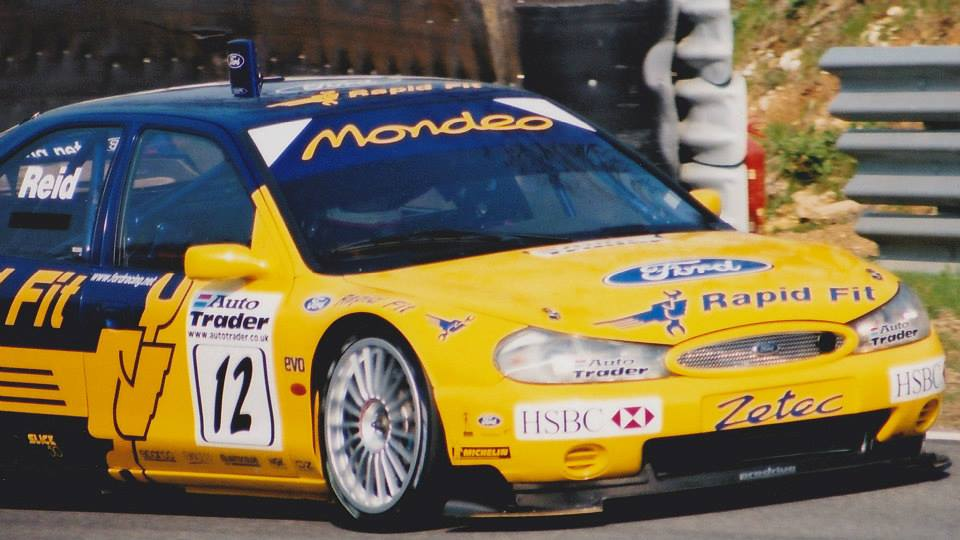
Ford won the championship in 2000, the final year running Super Touring regulations.

In 1990, the BTCC introduced a class for cars with an engine displacement up to 2.0 litres which would later be adopted by the Fédération Internationale de l'Automobile and become the Super Touring regulations that were used in various championships in Europe and around the world. In their first year, these cars were run alongside a second class which continued to allow larger engines and was once again dominated by the Ford Sierra Cosworth RS500, however from 1991 they became the only cars eligible to compete. The new one-class system was popular with manufacturers from the beginning with six manufacturer supported teams from BMW, Ford, Mitsubishi, Nissan, Toyota and Vauxhall entered in the championship. During the first seasons, the cars were not fitted with aerodynamic aids such as a front splitter or a rear wing which were allowed from 1995 after Alfa Romeo caused controversy a year earlier, when they entered the 155 fitted with a rear wing – an item that was delivered with the road-going version of the 155, however unfitted in its boot. Audi joined the BTCC in 1996 with its four-wheel drive A4 Quattro, and went on to take that year's title. The continuously high number of manufacturer-backed teams meant rapid development on the cars and quickly growing costs to compete which caused several manufacturers to withdraw from the championship until the 2000 season, when only Ford, Honda and Vauxhall remained in the championship. To this day, the 'super touring era' during the 1990s is still looked at as the most successful period of the BTCC. The high number of manufacturer-backed teams provided very close competition, close and hard-fought racing on track and many spectators at the circuits.

==== BTC Touring and Super 2000 cars ====
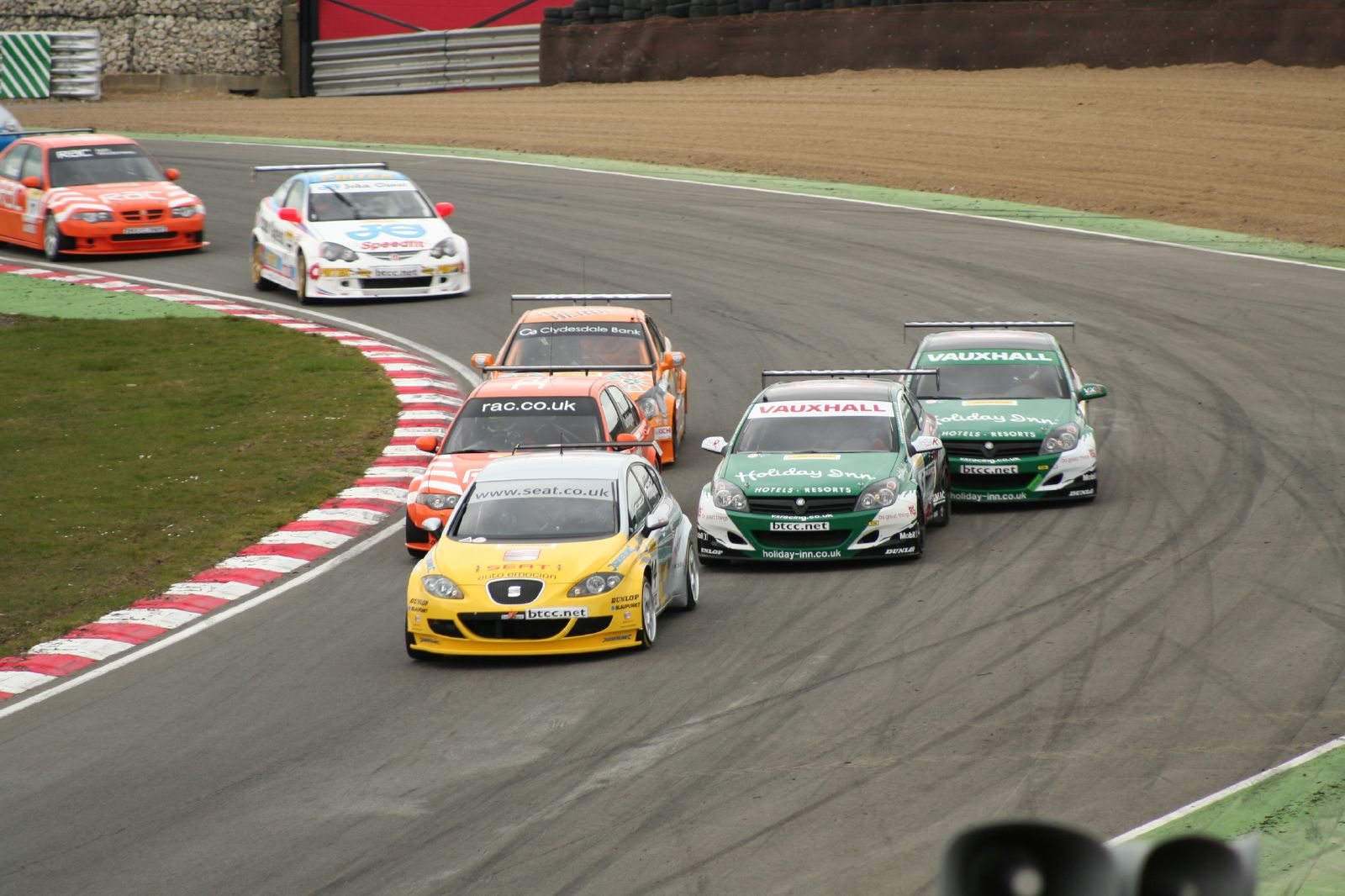
Previous generation BTC Touring cars racing at Brands Hatch, April 2006

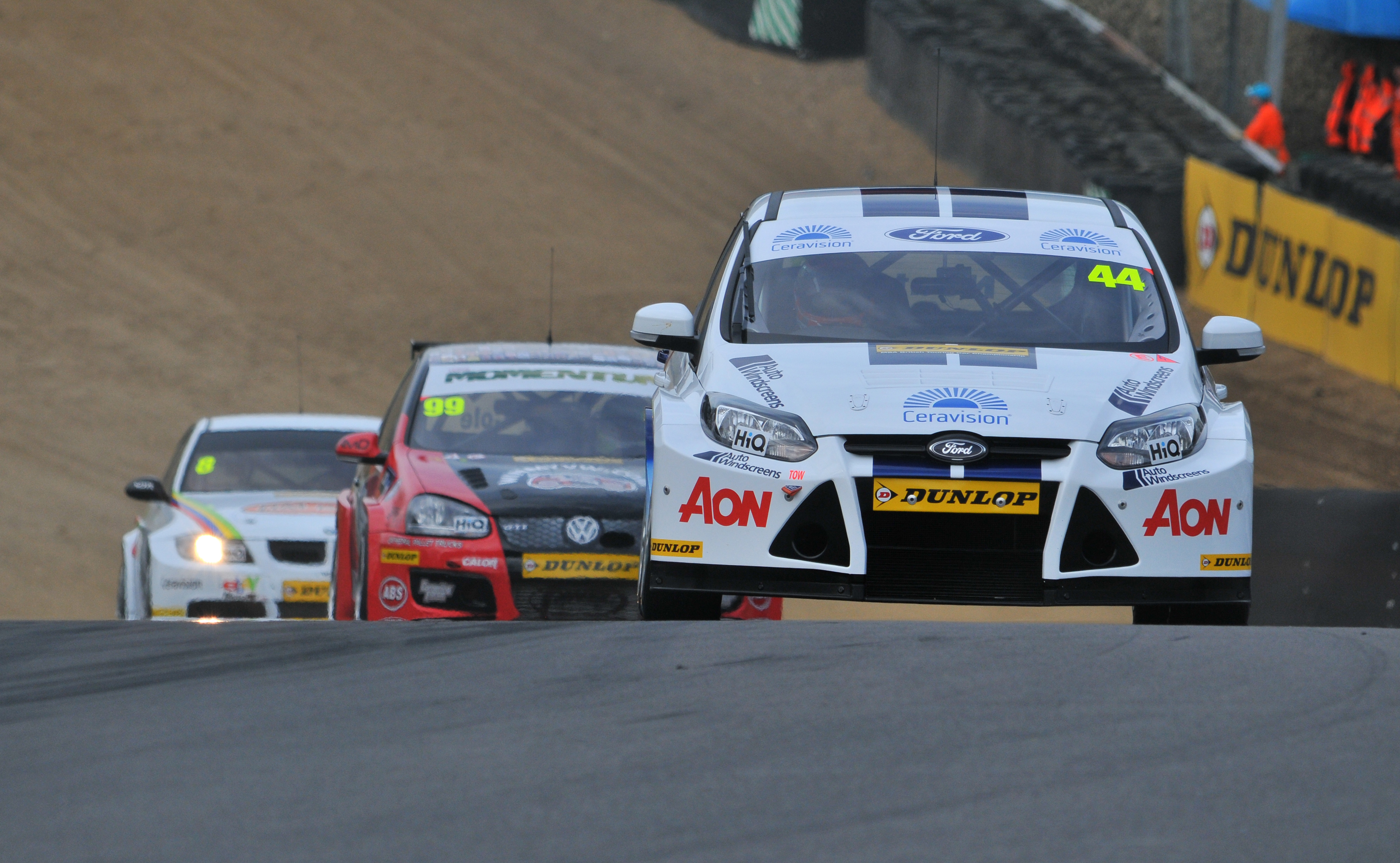
Touring Cars at a BTCC during race at Brands Hatch, April 2011

In order to reduce the costs to compete in the championship, the organisers introduced new regulations for the 2001 season. The BTC Touring regulations cut costs dramatically but both manufacturer and spectator interest was low. The Super 2000 rules were adopted for the 2007 season. The 2000s saw cheaper cars than the later Supertouring era, with fewer factory teams and fewer international drivers.

==== Next Generation Touring Car ====
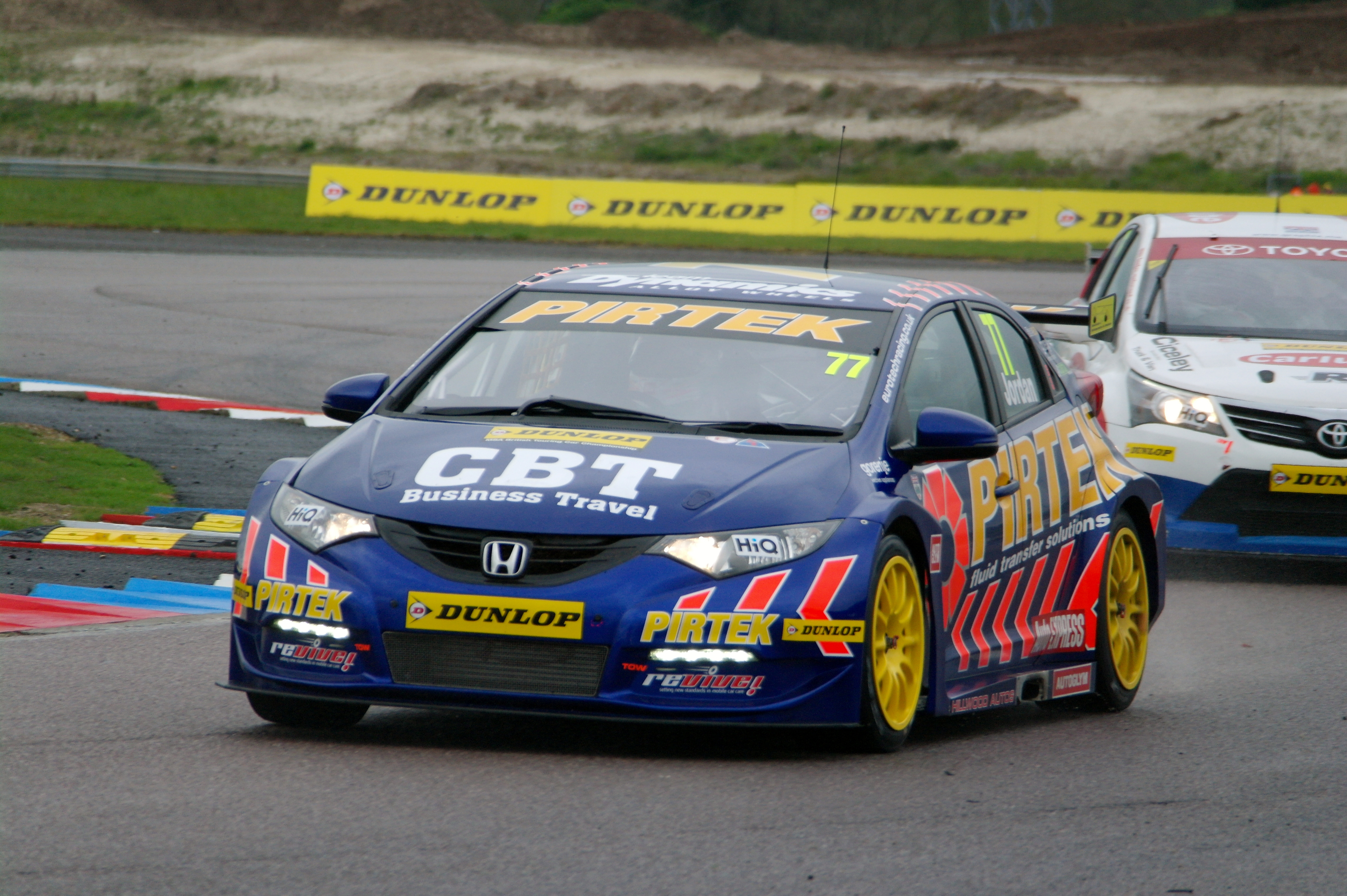
Andrew Jordan in his NGTC Honda Civic during practice at Thruxton Circuit, April 2012

In 2009, the BTCC released details of its Next Generation Touring Car (NGTC) specification, to be introduced from 2011. The introduction of these new technical regulations were designed to dramatically reduce the design, build and running costs of the cars and engines as well as reducing the potential for significant performance disparities between cars. The NGTC specification also aimed to cut costs by reducing reliance on WTCC/S2000 equipment, due to increasing costs/complexity and concerns as to its future sustainability and direction.

===== Current NGTC cars =====
Currently, the cars used are a mix of 2.0L saloons (sedans) such as the BMW 3-Series and Infiniti Q50, and hatchback cars such as the Honda Civic, Toyota Corolla and Ford Focus, based on models from a variety of manufacturers, using NGTC regulations. S2000 cars continued running in the Jack Sears Trophy until the 2014 season.

=== Teams ===
BTCC teams are a mixture of manufacturer entries (currently BMW and Toyota) and independent teams such as BTC Racing, and Motorbase Performance.

In 2010, following Vauxhall's decision to pull out of the series, there were two new works teams Chevrolet, run by RML; and Honda, run by Team Dynamics.

In 2005, Team Dynamics became the first independent outfit to win the BTCC drivers and team championships; Matt Neal won the overall and independent drivers contests in his Team Dynamics Honda Integra. This included finishing all 30 championship races that year, something no other driver had achieved before and only equalled by Adam Morgan some 10 years later in 2015. This ended Vauxhall's run of 4 victories in the drivers and teams championships between 2001 and 2004. Neal and Dynamics were also victorious in 2006, before Vauxhall won the 2007 title with Italian Fabrizio Giovanardi. Team Dynamics also achieved the first overall independents race win in the 'Supertouring' era when Neal won a round of the 1999 BTCC at Donington Park, earning the team prize-money of £250,000.

As a result of Matt Neal's championship victories, and the fact that Team Dynamics were designing and building their own S2000 Honda Civic Type R (with unofficial support from Honda), they were no longer entered into the Independents category, and were classed as neither an "independent" or "works" team until the 2009 season, when the Manufacturers championship was renamed Manufacturers/Constructors Championship to allow both Team Aon and Team Dynamics to compete with at the time the sole works entry of Vauxhall.

== Car regulations ==
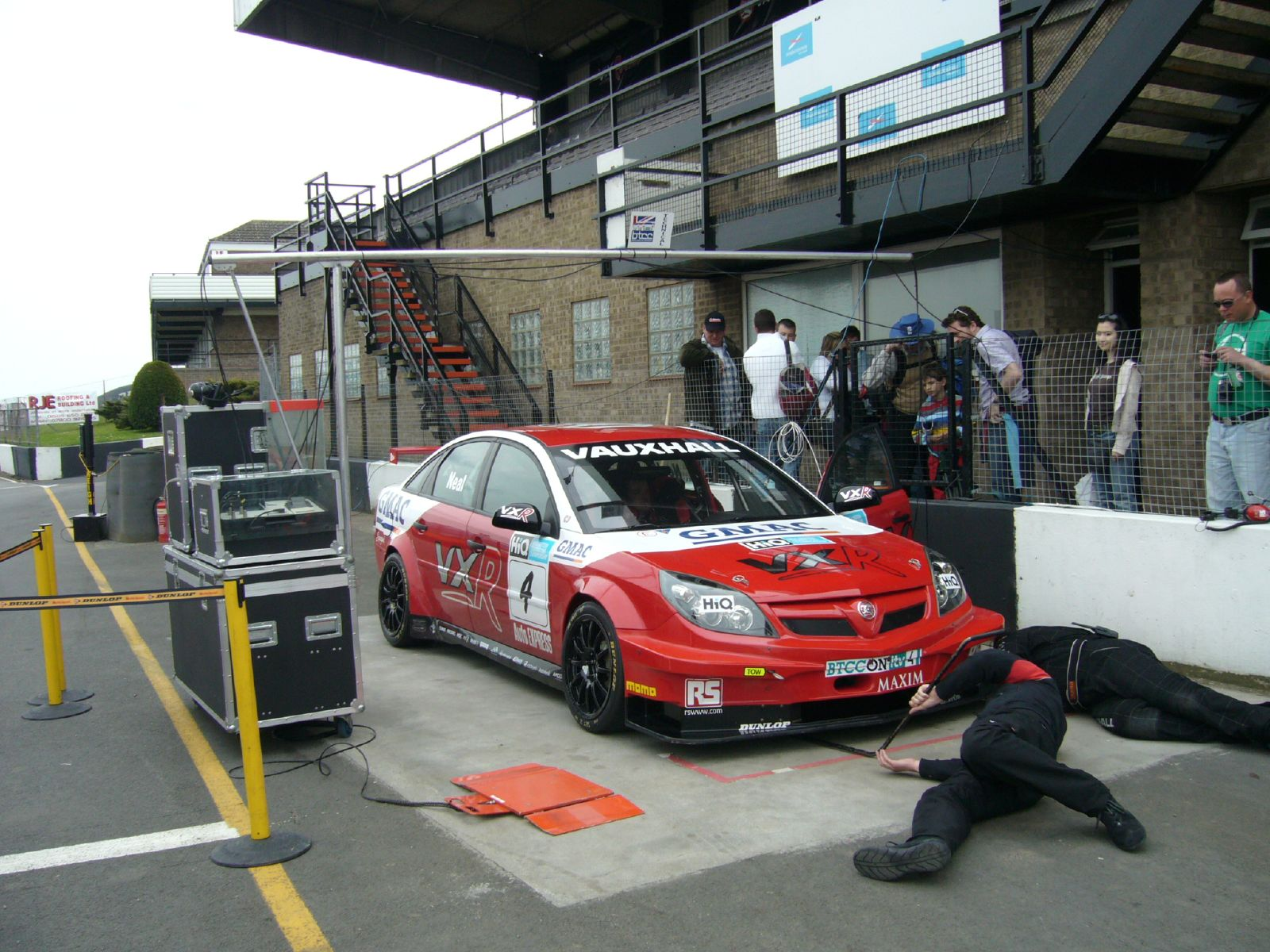
VXRacing Vectra being checked by the scrutineers

=== Current regulations ===
As of the 2014 British Touring Car Championship, all cars are built to the same regulations:

- Next Generation Touring Car. New set of regulations specifically developed for the BTCC as a way of moving the sport forward and cut costs for competitors. Introduced from 2011, these new technical regulations were designed to dramatically reduce the design, build and running costs of the cars and engines as well as reduce reliance on WTCC/S2000 equipment. NGTC cars initially maintained performance parity with S2000 cars until the 2013 season when full NGTC cars became the main championship class with Hybrid S2000/NGTC cars running in a secondary class. From the 2014 season, only NGTC cars are eligible to compete in the BTCC.

=== Cost control measures ===
There are strict limits to the modifications which can be made to the cars, which are intended to reduce the cost of running a competitive team, which had become prohibitive in the final years of the Super Touring rules. These cost reductions saw a rise in independent entries – teams or individuals entering cars purchased from the manufacturer teams when they update their chassis.

With the introduction of the NGTC rules, all cars share a number of common components provided through a contract with RML Group. This has allowed many independent teams to enter without the need for manufacturer support, and negating the need to source ex-works cars. Teams can install an engine from their marque's broad 'family' of cars, or opt to lease an engine from TOCA, built by Swindon Engines which also helps to make the cost of entry more affordable.

To further keep costs in check, the BTCC uses a single tyre supplier, with Goodyear Tire and Rubber Company the current supplier of rubber to all the teams. The following compounds are used: Hard, Medium, Soft and Wet.

=== Fuels ===
The rules previously allowed for a variety of different fuels in a bid to encourage more efficient cars. In 2004 Mardi Gras Motorsport independently entered a Liquified petroleum gas powered Super 2000 Honda Civic Type-R (which was subsequently replaced by a more competitive BTC-Touring Peugeot 406 Coupé, still LPG powered), and in 2005 Tech-Speed Motorsport converted an ex-works Vauxhall Astra Coupé to run on bio-ethanol fuel. In the middle of 2006, Kartworld's owner-driver Jason Hughes converted his 4-cylinder MG ZS to run on Bio-Ethanol, soon followed by the West Surrey Racing cars of championship contender Colin Turkington and Rob Collard, and for the final event at Silverstone, Richard Marsh converted his Peugeot 307 to run on bio-ethanol fuel. Only Hughes continued on this fuel in 2007 and 2008. The regulations also permitted cars to run on diesel; attempted first in the 2007 season by Rick Kerry in a BMW 120d E87 run by Team AFM Racing. In 2008 SEAT Sport UK entered two Turbo Diesel Power SEAT Leons – the first diesel powered manufacturer entered cars. At the start of the 2010 season, it was announced that Team Aon Racing had converted both of their Ford Focus ST cars to run on LPG. In 2024, Daryl DeLeon ran his Cupra Leon on 100% sustainable fuel for the final two meetings. Such fuels were introduced full-time for the 2025 Season.

Under current NGTC regulations, all entrants use Carless HiperFlo 300 which is a 101/102 RON and 89/90 MON unleaded gasoline with approximately 2% oxygen content that meets the FIA 'Appendix J' gasoline specification.

=== Previous regulations ===
The following regulations have been applied to the championship:

- 1958 – unique BTCC regulations
- 1959 – FIA Appendix J Category C
- 1960 – 'silhouette' special saloon cars (1000cc)
- 1961 to 1965 – FIA Group 2
- 1966 to 1969 – FIA Group 5
- 1970 to 1973 – FIA Group 2
- 1974 to 1983 – FIA Group 1
- 1983 to 1990 – FIA Group A
- 1991 to 2000 – 2 Litre Touring Car Formula, later becoming FIA Super Touring
- 2001 to 2011 – BTC Touring. The BTCC developed and introduced this specification in 2001, in response to the spiralling costs of the Super Touring specification. However, with the Super 2000 specification being used in the newly reformed World Touring Car Championship, the popularity of the BTC-T spec with top teams and manufactures was short lived. Therefore, from the 2007 season, BTC-T spec cars were no longer allowed to win the championship outright. The 2010 season was meant to be the last year BTC-T cars would be eligible to enter the championship, however Series Director Alan Gow announced a one-year extension to allow BTC-T to compete in 2011 (with their base-weight +50kg on the 2010 season). Only cars that competed in 2010 would be eligible to race in 2011.
- 2004 to 2013 – Super 2000. Regulations first introduced to the BTCC in 2004, allowing teams to build cars eligible to race in several different Touring Car Championships, including the World Touring Car Championship. Car built to this specification were eligible to compete until the end of the 2013 season, however the last fully S2000 cars were entered in the 2011 season.
- 2010 to 2013 – S2000/NGTC Hybrid. From the 2010 season, teams with S2000 chassis were allowed to use an NGTC engine with their car. As of the 2012 season, all teams with S2000 chassis, used NGTC turbo charged engines. This hybrid specification was eligible until the end of the 2013 season.

== Circuits ==
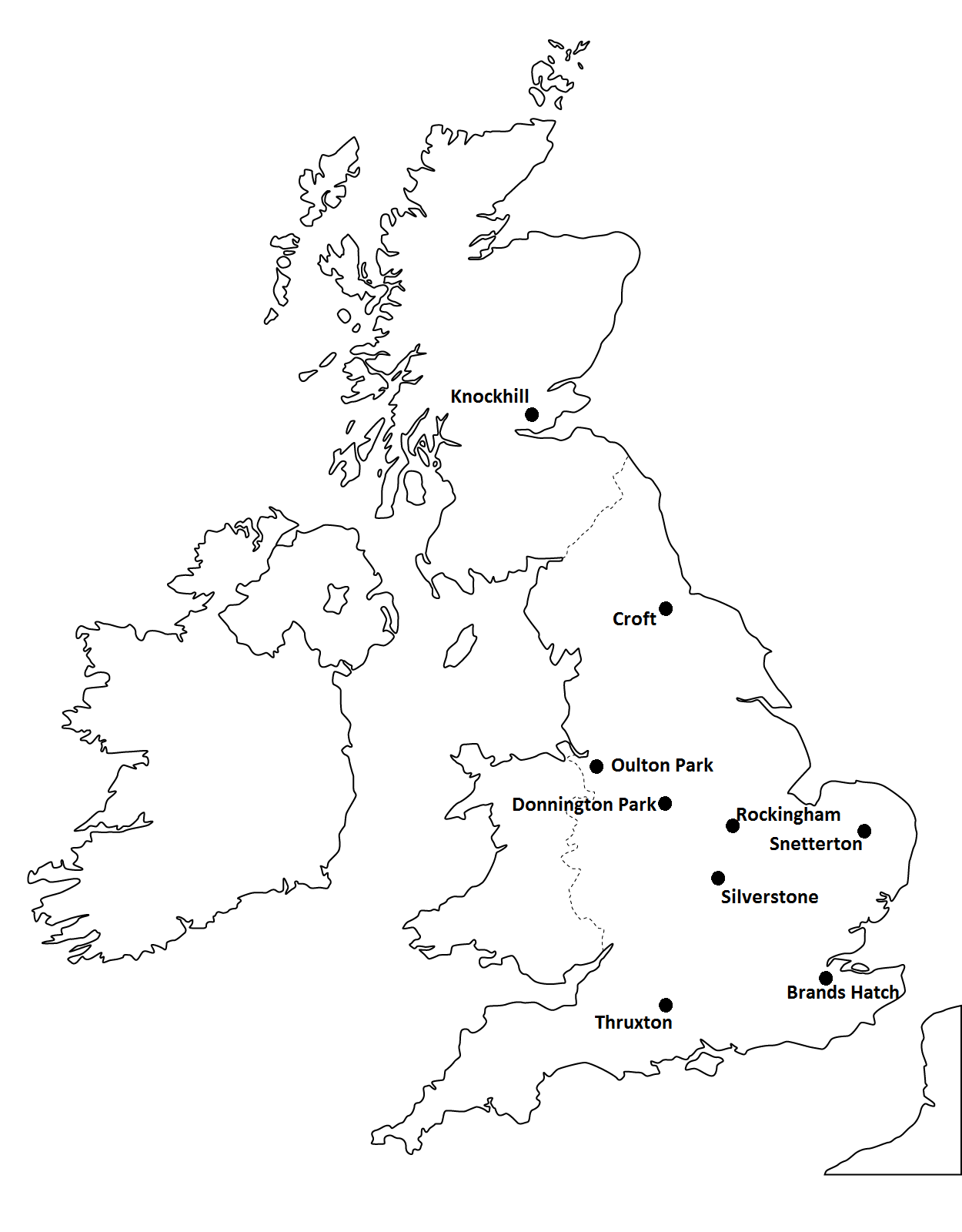
Current circuits of the BTCC

Being a national championship, the British Touring Car Championship has visited circuits throughout the United Kingdom over its long history. Currently the series visits eight different tracks in England and Scotland over the course of ten meetings. These tracks are: Brands Hatch (Indy Layout), Donington Park, Thruxton (the fastest track ever visited by the BTCC, with an average speed of 111.31mph, set by Andrew Jordan during qualifying in 2014), Oulton Park, Croft, Snetterton, Knockhill, and Silverstone (National and International layouts), with a return to Brands Hatch (GP Layout) at the end of the season.

In the past, the BTCC has visited Mondello Park in Ireland and Pembrey in Wales. A street race around the city of Birmingham known as the Birmingham Superprix, was held in 1989 and 1990.

Aintree, Crystal Palace, Goodwood, Ingliston, Mallory Park and Rockingham have also hosted rounds in the past.

== Race format ==
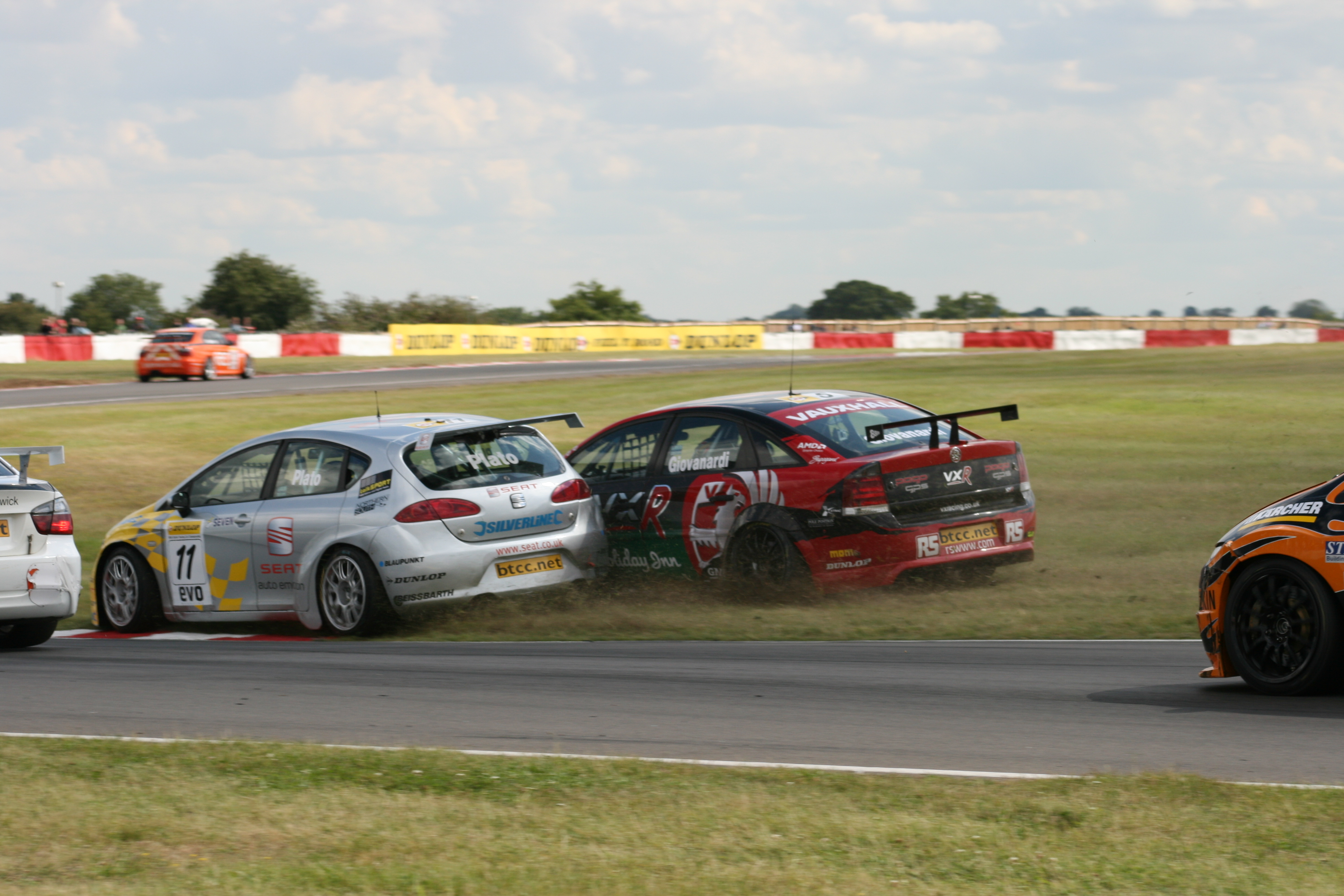
Championship contenders Jason Plato (SEAT) and Fabrizio Giovanardi (Vauxhall) collide during a BTCC race at Snetterton in July 2007. The BTCC is known for being a high-contact series.

On the Saturday of a race weekend there are two practice sessions followed by a 30-minute qualifying session which determines the starting order for the first race on the Sunday, the fastest driver lining up in pole position.

Each race typically consists of between 16 and 25 laps, depending on the length of the circuit. A race may be extended by three laps if three or more laps have been run behind a safety car.

The grid for race two is based on the finishing order of race one. For race three, a draw takes place to decide at which place the grid is 'reversed'. This means drivers finishing race two in positions 6th through 12th could take pole position for race 3 depending on the outcome of the draw. For example, if ball number 7 is drawn, the driver finishing in 7th position in race two starts on pole, 6th place starts in second place, 5th place starts in third etc. Drivers finishing in 8th place and beyond would start race three in their finishing order for race two. The draw is normally conducted by a celebrity or VIP, live on TV. For 2014, this was changed so that the driver who finished Race 2 in 10th position made the draw. Fabrizio Giovanardi has twice managed to put himself on pole position by drawing out number 10.

Before 2006, the driver finishing in 10th place in race two took pole position for race three. This initiated deliberate race 'fixing', whereby some drivers attempted to finished in 10th place during race two to gain pole position in race three. This "reverse grid" rule polarised opinion: some fans enjoy the spectacle afforded by having unlikely drivers on pole position while faster ones have to battle through the field; others feel it detracts from the purity of the racing. For example, some drivers might decide to slow down and let others pass them, thereby improving their own starting position for the "reverse grid" race, which is contrary to the spirit of motor racing – which is to try to come first in every race. It also led to some safety concerns as drivers would slow dramatically on the approach to the finish line, with cars behind forced to take evasive action to avoid collecting slower cars ahead. These factors contributed the rule change for the 2006 season.

== Points system ==
=== Current points system ===
Points are awarded to the top fifteen drivers in each race as follows:

Current BTCC points system (2012–Present)
Race	1st	2nd	3rd	4th	5th	6th	7th	8th	9th	10th	11th	12th	13th	14th	15th	Pole position	Fastest lap	Lead a lap
R1	20	17	15	13	11	10	9	8	7	6	5	4	3	2	1	1	1	1
R2	20	17	15	13	11	10	9	8	7	6	5	4	3	2	1		1	1
R3	20	17	15	13	11	10	9	8	7	6	5	4	3	2	1		1	1

- No driver may collect more than one "Lead a Lap" point per race no matter how many laps they lead.

=== Previous points system ===
Points are awarded to the top ten drivers in each race as follows:

BTCC points system
Race	1st	2nd	3rd	4th	5th	6th	7th	8th	9th	10th	Pole position	Fastest lap	Lead a lap
R1	15	12	10	8	6	5	4	3	2	1	1	1	1
R2	15	12	10	8	6	5	4	3	2	1		1	1
R3	15	12	10	8	6	5	4	3	2	1		1	1

- No driver may collect more than one "Lead a Lap" point per race no matter how many laps they lead.

== Television coverage ==
In 1987 the championship was screened in the UK and some European countries by Cable channel Screensport and in Australia by the 7 Network produced by Hay Fisher Productions.

The BBC screened highlights of every race from 1988 to 2001. The F1 commentator at the time, Murray Walker, commentated. From 1997, some races were screened live with Charlie Cox joining Murray Walker. After 1997 the commentary team was Charlie Cox and John Watson with Murray Walker dedicating his time to Formula 1.

In the UK, ITV covered the series from 2002, with commentary from Ben Edwards and former champion Tim Harvey, with Toby Moody replacing Edwards after he replaced Martin Brundle on the BBC's F1 coverage in 2012 and David Addison replaced Toby Moody for the 2013 season. In 2006 the ITV coverage included highlights from the first and second race of the day and live coverage of the third and final race. This returned in the second half of 2007, after the first five meetings had been on ITV3 (a digital channel with fewer viewers), with a half-hour late-night highlights show. Experienced motorsport presenter Louise Goodman joined the ITV team from 2007. ITV also has a Sunday night show called Motorsport UK, featuring many of the supporting races. From 2008, the races were screened live on ITV4, along with the support races.

The current coverage consists of Saturday's Qualifying Sessions and support races live on ITVX. Sunday coverage starts an hour before Race 1 and finishes after Race 3. All of Sunday's Coverage is aired on ITV4. ITV has a one-hour highlights programme on the Monday night following the race.

World-wide broadcasting began in 2025, with coverage being livestreamed on the BTCC YouTube Channel to all countries except the UK and North America.

TV Coverage of 2025 season
Country	TV Network	Language	Qualifying	Race 1	Race 2	Race 3	Notes
United Kingdom	ITV4 / ITV4 HD	English	No	Live	Live	Live	Up to 7 Hours of coverage per meeting (also shows live and delayed coverage of support races). Simulcast High Definition coverage on ITV4 HD
United Kingdom	ITV4 / ITV4 HD	English	No	Highlights			90 minute highlight show of all 3 races and qualifying
United Kingdom	ITV Sport Website/ITVX	English	Live	Live	Live	Live	Live video stream. Highlights available to watch anytime after the race via the Race Archive
United Kingdom	ITV / ITV HD	English	No	Highlights			90 minute highlight show of all 3 races and qualifying. Simulcast High Definition coverage on ITV HD

== Live timing ==
Live timing for the BTCC and its support races, as well as testing, is provided by Timing Solutions Ltd from their website. This service allows you to follow free practice and qualifying as well as race day action via a timing screen from your computer or mobile phone.

== Previous champions ==
Currently, five championships are awarded per season. The overall driver's championship is the driver gaining the most points overall throughout the season. Since 1992, the Independents driver championship has also been awarded to the leading non-manufacturer-backed driver. There are also awards for the best overall team, leading manufacturer and, since 2005, the top independent team. Previous championship titles were awarded to the leading "Production" (or "Class B") driver and team between 2000 and 2003. The Jack Sears Trophy was introduced for the 2013 season and was awarded to the highest scoring driver competing in S2000 machinery. For 2014, with S2000 cars no longer eligible to compete, it was awarded to the drive that had made up the most places from their grid position throughout the season. From the 2015 season the Jack Sears Trophy has been awarded to the highest placed rookie driver at the end of the season. For the 60th anniversary year in 2018, any driver who had yet to take an overall podium was eligible to contest the Jack Sears Trophy.

Season	Overall			Independent		Secondary Class	
Season	Drivers' Champion (Car)	Manufacturers / Makes Champion	Teams' Champion	Drivers' Champion	Teams' Champion	Drivers' Champion	Teams' Champion
1958	(United Kingdom) Jack Sears (Austin A105 Westminster)	none	none				
1959	(United Kingdom) Jeff Uren (Ford Zephyr Six)	none	none				
1960	(United Kingdom) Doc Shepherd (Austin A40 Farina)	none	none				
1961	(United Kingdom) Sir John Whitmore (Austin Seven)	none	none				
1962	(Federation of Rhodesia and Nyasaland) John Love (Morris Cooper)	none	none				
1963	(United Kingdom) Jack Sears (2) (Ford Galaxie & Ford Cortina Lotus)	none	none				
1964	(United Kingdom) Jim Clark (Ford Cortina Lotus)	none	none				
1965	(United Kingdom) Roy Pierpoint (Ford Mustang)	none	Weybridge Engineering Company				
1966	(United Kingdom) John Fitzpatrick (Ford Anglia)	none	Team Lotus				
1967	(Australia) Frank Gardner (Ford Falcon (Sprint)	none	none				
1968	(Australia) Frank Gardner (2) (Ford Cortina Lotus) & (Ford Escort Twin Cam)	none	none				
1969	(Republic of Ireland) Alec Poole (Austin Cooper 970S)	none	none				
1970	(United Kingdom) Bill McGovern (Sunbeam Imp)	none	none				
1971	(United Kingdom) Bill McGovern (2) (Sunbeam Imp Rallye)	none	none				
1972	(United Kingdom) Bill McGovern (3) (Sunbeam Imp)	none	none				
1973	(Australia) Frank Gardner (3) (Chevrolet Camaro Z28)	none	none				
1974	(United Kingdom) Bernard Unett (Hillman Avenger GT)	none	none				
1975	(United Kingdom) Andy Rouse (Triumph Dolomite Sprint)	Chevrolet Camaro; Triumph Dolomite	none				
1976	(United Kingdom) Bernard Unett (2) (Chrysler Avenger GT)	none	none				
1977	(United Kingdom) Bernard Unett (3) (Chrysler Avenger GT)	none	none				
1978	(United Kingdom) Richard Longman (BL Mini 1275GT)	none	none				
1979	(United Kingdom) Richard Longman (2) (BL Mini 1275GT)	BL Mini	none				
1980	(United Kingdom) Win Percy (Mazda RX-7)	none	none				
1981	(United Kingdom) Win Percy (2) (Mazda RX-7)	none	none				
1982	(United Kingdom) Win Percy (3) (Toyota Corolla)	none	none				
1983	(United Kingdom) Andy Rouse (2) (Alfa Romeo GTV6)	none	none				
1984	(United Kingdom) Andy Rouse (3) (Rover Vitesse)	none	none				
1985	(United Kingdom) Andy Rouse (4) (Ford Sierra XR4Ti)	none	none				
1986	(United Kingdom) Chris Hodgetts (Toyota Corolla GT)	none	none				
1987	(United Kingdom) Chris Hodgetts (2) (Toyota Corolla GT)	none	none				
1988	(United Kingdom) Frank Sytner (BMW E30 M3)	none	none				
1989	(United Kingdom) John Cleland (Vauxhall Astra GTE 16v)	none	none				
1990	(United Kingdom) Robb Gravett (Ford Sierra RS500)	none	none				
1991	(United Kingdom) Will Hoy (BMW E30 M3)	BMW	none				
1992	(United Kingdom) Tim Harvey (BMW E36 318is)	Vauxhall	none	(United Kingdom) James Kaye			
1993	(Germany) Joachim Winkelhock (BMW E36 318i)	BMW	none	(United Kingdom) Matt Neal			
1994	(Italy) Gabriele Tarquini (Alfa Romeo 155 TS)	Alfa Romeo	none	(United Kingdom) James Kaye (2)			
1995	(United Kingdom) John Cleland (2); Vauxhall Cavalier	Renault	Vauxhall Sport	(United Kingdom) Matt Neal (2)			
1996	(Germany) Frank Biela (Audi A4 Quattro)	Audi	Audi Sport UK	(United Kingdom) Lee Brookes			
1997	(Switzerland) Alain Menu (Renault Laguna)	Renault	Williams Renault Dealer Racing	(United Kingdom) Robb Gravett			
1998	(Sweden) Rickard Rydell (Volvo S40)	Nissan	Vodafone Nissan Racing	(Norway) Tommy Rustad		Production Class	
1999	(France) Laurent Aïello (Nissan Primera)	Nissan	Vodafone Nissan Racing	(United Kingdom) Matt Neal (3)		Drivers' Champion	Teams' Champion
2000	(Switzerland) Alain Menu (2) (Ford Mondeo)	Ford	Ford Team Mondeo	(United Kingdom) Matt Neal (4)		(United Kingdom) Alan Morrison	
2001	(United Kingdom) Jason Plato (Vauxhall Astra Coupe)	Vauxhall	Vauxhall Motorsport	none		(United Kingdom) Simon Harrison	GR Motorsport
2002	(United Kingdom) James Thompson (Vauxhall Astra Coupe)	Vauxhall	Vauxhall Motorsport	(United Kingdom) Dan Eaves		(United Kingdom) James Kaye	Synchro Motorsport
2003	(France) Yvan Muller (Vauxhall Astra Coupe)	Vauxhall	VX Racing	(United Kingdom) Rob Collard		(United Kingdom) Luke Hines	Barwell Motorsport
2004	(United Kingdom) James Thompson (2) (Vauxhall Astra Coupe)	Vauxhall	VX Racing	(United Kingdom) Anthony Reid			
2005	(United Kingdom) Matt Neal (Honda Integra)	Vauxhall	Team Halfords	(United Kingdom) Matt Neal (5)	Team Halfords		
2006	(United Kingdom) Matt Neal (2) (Honda Integra)	SEAT	Team Halfords	(United Kingdom) Matt Neal (6)	Team Halfords		
2007	(Italy) Fabrizio Giovanardi (Vauxhall Vectra VXR)	Vauxhall	SEAT Sport UK	(United Kingdom) Colin Turkington	Team RAC		
2008	(Italy) Fabrizio Giovanardi (2) (Vauxhall Vectra VXR)	Vauxhall	VX Racing	(United Kingdom) Colin Turkington (2)	Team RAC		
2009	(United Kingdom) Colin Turkington (BMW E90 320si)	Vauxhall (8)	VX Racing	(United Kingdom) Colin Turkington (3)	Team RAC		
2010	(United Kingdom) Jason Plato (2) (Chevrolet Cruze)	Honda	Honda Racing Team	(United Kingdom) Tom Chilton	Team Aon		
2011	(United Kingdom) Matt Neal (3) (Honda Civic)	Honda (2)	Honda Racing Team	(United Kingdom) James Nash	Triple 8 Race Engineering	Jack Sears Trophy	
2012	(United Kingdom) Gordon Shedden (Honda Civic)	Honda / Team Dynamics	Honda Yuasa Racing Team	(United Kingdom) Andrew Jordan	Pirtek Racing (Eurotech)	Drivers' Champion	Teams' Champion
2013	(United Kingdom) Andrew Jordan (Honda Civic)	Honda / Team Dynamics	Honda Yuasa Racing Team	(United Kingdom) Andrew Jordan (2)	Pirtek Racing (Eurotech)	(United Kingdom) Lea Wood	Not awarded
2014	(United Kingdom) Colin Turkington (2) (BMW 125i M Sport)	MG / Triple Eight	eBay Motors	(United Kingdom) Colin Turkington (4)	eBay Motors	(United Kingdom) Dave Newsham	Not awarded
2015	(United Kingdom) Gordon Shedden (2) (Honda Civic Type R)	Honda / Team Dynamics (3)	Team BMR RCIB Insurance	(United Kingdom) Colin Turkington (5)	Team BMR RCIB Insurance	(United Kingdom) Josh Cook	Not awarded
2016	(United Kingdom) Gordon Shedden (3) (Honda Civic Type R)	BMW	Team JCT600 with GardX	(United Kingdom) Andrew Jordan (3)	Motorbase Performance	(United Kingdom) Ashley Sutton	Not awarded
2017	(United Kingdom) Ashley Sutton (Subaru Levorg GT)	BMW	Team BMW	(United Kingdom) Tom Ingram	Speedworks Motorsport	(United Kingdom) Senna Proctor	Not awarded
2018	(United Kingdom) Colin Turkington (3) (BMW 125i M Sport)	BMW	Team BMW	(United Kingdom) Tom Ingram (2)	Speedworks Motorsport	(United Kingdom) Dan Cammish	Not awarded
2019	(United Kingdom) Colin Turkington (4) (BMW 330i M Sport)	BMW	Halfords Yuasa Racing	(United Kingdom) Rory Butcher	Cobra Sport AmD	(United Kingdom) Rory Butcher	Not awarded
2020	(United Kingdom) Ashley Sutton (2) (Infiniti Q50)	BMW	Laser Tools Racing	(United Kingdom) Ashley Sutton	Laser Tools Racing	(United Kingdom) Michael Crees	Not awarded
2021	(United Kingdom) Ashley Sutton (3) (Infiniti Q50)	BMW	Laser Tools Racing	(United Kingdom) Ashley Sutton (2)	Laser Tools Racing	(United Kingdom) Dan Rowbottom	Not awarded
2022	(United Kingdom) Tom Ingram (Hyundai i30 Fastback N Performance)	BMW	NAPA Racing UK	(United Kingdom) Josh Cook	Rich Energy BTC Racing	(United Kingdom) Bobby Thompson	Not awarded
2023	(United Kingdom) Ashley Sutton (4) (Ford Focus ST)	Ford / Alliance Racing	NAPA Racing UK	(United Kingdom) Josh Cook (2)	One Motorsport with Starline Racing	(United Kingdom) Andrew Watson	Not awarded
2024	(United Kingdom) Jake Hill (BMW 330e M Sport)	BMW (10)	NAPA Racing UK	(Republic of Ireland) Árón Taylor-Smith	Evans Halshaw Power Maxed Racing	(United Kingdom) Mikey Doble	Not awarded
2025	(United Kingdom) Tom Ingram (2) (Hyundai i30 Fastback N Performance)	Hyundai / EXCELR8 Motorsport	NAPA Racing UK	(United Kingdom) Daniel Lloyd	Restart Racing	(Philippines) Daryl DeLeon	Not awarded
2026	(United Kingdom) Ashley Sutton (5) (Ford Focus Titanium Saloon)	Ford / Alliance Racing	NAPA Racing UK	(United Kingdom) Mikey Doble	LKQ Euro Car Parts with Power Maxed Racing	(United Kingdom) Dexter Patterson	

== Manufacturers'/Constructors' championship winners (1991–present) ==
Year	Make	Car	Wins
1991	BMW	BMW M3	8/14
1992	Vauxhall	Vauxhall Cavalier	5/15
1993	BMW	BMW 318i	8/17
1994	Alfa Romeo	Alfa Romeo 155	9/21
1995	Renault	Renault Laguna	10/25
1996	Audi	Audi A4	8/26
1997	Renault	Renault Laguna	14/24
1998	Nissan	Nissan Primera	9/26
1999	Nissan	Nissan Primera	13/26
2000	Ford	Ford Mondeo	11/24
2001	Vauxhall	Vauxhall Astra Coupé	25/26
2002	Vauxhall	Vauxhall Astra Coupé	15/20
2003	Vauxhall	Vauxhall Astra Coupé	11/20
2004	Vauxhall	Vauxhall Astra Coupé	11/30
2005	Vauxhall	Vauxhall Astra Sport Hatch	8/30
2006	SEAT	SEAT León	11/30
2007	Vauxhall	Vauxhall Vectra	10/30
2008	Vauxhall	Vauxhall Vectra	8/30
2009	Vauxhall	Vauxhall Vectra	6/30
2010	Honda	Honda Civic	10/30
2011	Honda	Honda Civic	13/30
2012	Honda	Honda Civic	13/30
2013	Honda	Honda Civic	9/30
2014	MG	MG6 GT	7/30
2015	Honda	Honda Civic Type R	7/30
2016	BMW	BMW 125i M Sport	4/30
2017	BMW	BMW 125i M Sport	7/30
2018	BMW	BMW 125i M Sport	3/30
2019	BMW	BMW 330i M Sport	11/30
2020	BMW	BMW 330i M Sport	6/27
2021	BMW	BMW 330i M Sport	5/30
2022	BMW	BMW 330e M Sport	9/30
2023	Ford	Ford Focus ST	16/30
2024	BMW	BMW 330e M Sport	13/30
2025	Hyundai	Hyundai i30 Fastback N Performance	9/30
2026	Ford	Ford Focus Titanium Saloon	12/30

== Series sponsors ==
The BTCC has had several championship sponsors over the years.

Year	Sponsor
1960	SupaTura
1972	Wiggins Teape Paperchase
1974	Castrol Anniversary
1975	Southern Organs
1976	Keith Prowse
1977–82	Tricentrol
1983–85	Trimoco
1987–88	Dunlop
1989–92	Esso
1993–2000	Auto Trader
2001	theAA.com
2002–04	Green Flag
2005–07	Dunlop
2008–09	HiQ
2010–18	Dunlop
2019-	Kwik Fit

== Manufacturer/Constructor entries ==
The BTCC features entries with the backing, funding and technical support of a motor manufacturer. This may be a motor racing team running cars on behalf of the manufacturer or cars being run directly by the factory. Below is a timeline of manufacturer/constructor entries from the beginning of the 2-litre era.

Manufacturer/Constructor entries
1991	1992	1993	1994	1995	1996	1997	1998	1999	2000	2001	2002	2003	2004	2005	2006	2007	2008	2009	2010	2011	2012	2013	2014	2015	2016	2017	2018	2019	2020	2021	2022	2023	2024	2025	2026
			Alfa Romeo																																
					Audi																														
BMW																								BMW											
																			Chevrolet																
Ford		Ford																Ford												Ford					
				Honda							Honda					Honda															Honda				
																															Hyundai				
																								Infiniti											
	Mazda																																		
																																			Mercedes
										MG											MG														
Mitsubishi																																			
Nissan						Nissan																													
	Peugeot									Peugeot																									
											Proton																								
		Renault																																	
													SEAT																						
																									Subaru										
Toyota																												Toyota							
Vauxhall																										Vauxhall									
			Volvo																																
1991	1992	1993	1994	1995	1996	1997	1998	1999	2000	2001	2002	2003	2004	2005	2006	2007	2008	2009	2010	2011	2012	2013	2014	2015	2016	2017	2018	2019	2020	2021	2022	2023	2024	2025	

== Support races ==
Each BTCC race meeting, the crowds are kept further entertained by the appearance of high-profile supporting championships, known as the TOCA Support Package, from the manufacturers Ford, Ginetta, Porsche and Renault.

=== TOCA support package ===
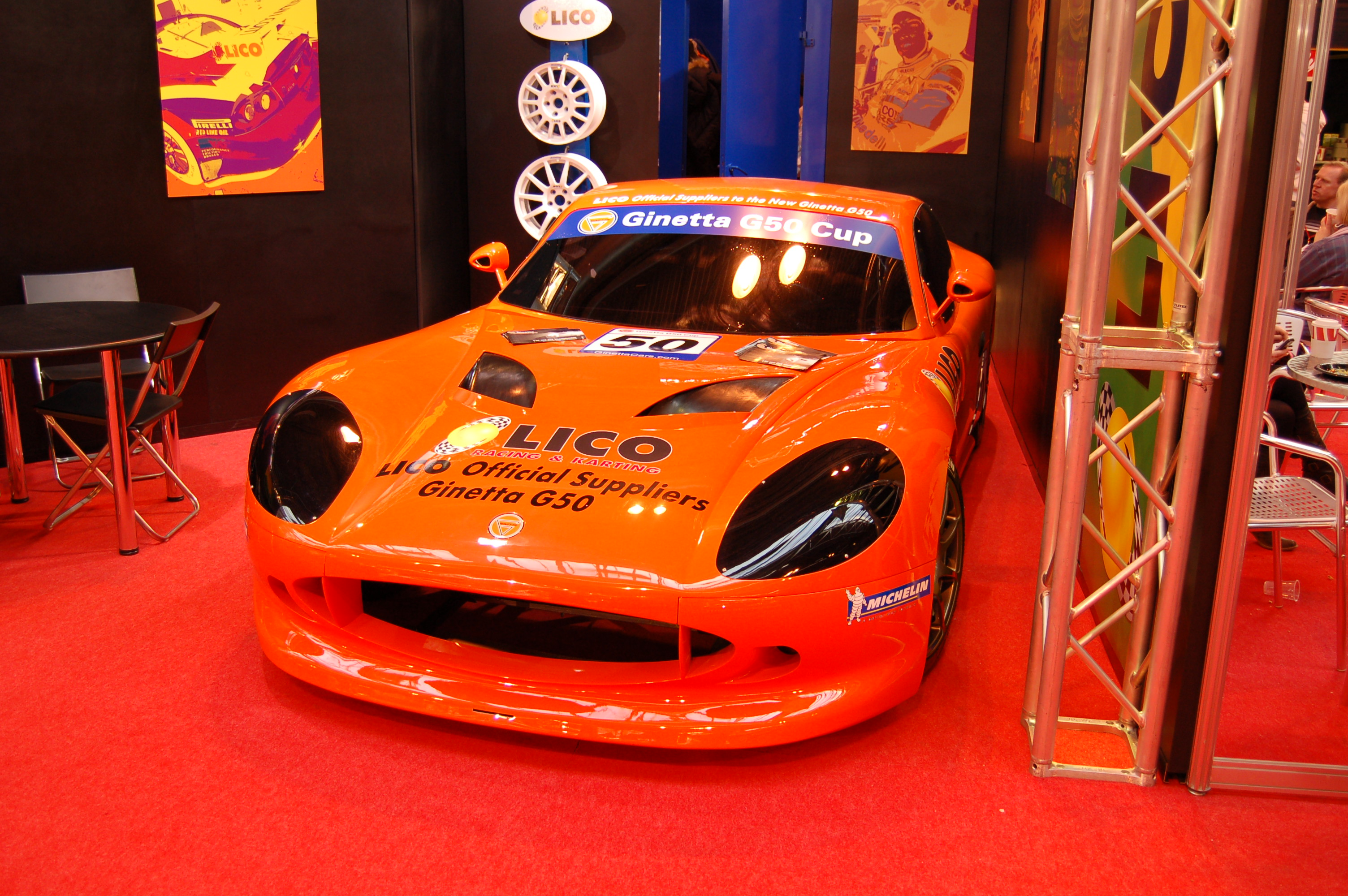
A Ginetta G50 Supercup car.

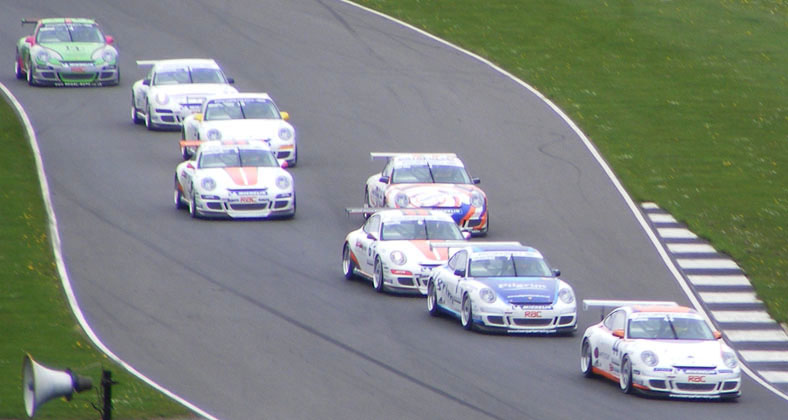
Porsche Carrera Cup GB Race at Donington Park

The TOCA Support Package consists of five main support championships, which support the championship at almost every round, along with several smaller championships supporting one or two events. All the support championships are either Single Make Championships or Formula racing.

After previously supported the BTCC in the late 1990s and then in 2013 and 2014, the British Formula Ford Championship announced that it was folding to become the MSA Formula, the FIA's Formula 4 championship in the UK for the 2015 season. Known as F4 British Championship from 2016, the championship uses Mygale carbon-fibre monocoque chassis and a Ford 1.6L EcoBoost engine as used in the more modern Formula Ford cars.

The Ginetta GT Supercup is a GT style, multi class championship. The main class is the G55 class, utilising Ginetta's G55 car. The second class, known as the G50 class, utilises the older and less powerful Ginetta G50. Most weekends in 2013 see three Supercup races with a few rounds hosting only two races. Ginetta also run a championship on the support package that caters for up and coming young talent in the form of the Ginetta Junior Championship. These 14- to 17-year-olds race in identical Ginetta G40J cars with strict regulations which help keep costs down. In 2013, the championship ran two races at all BTCC weekends. The Ginetta Championships left TOCA and are now on the British GT support bill.

Out of all the current support series, the Porsche Carrera Cup GB is the longest serving support championship. Drivers compete in identical Porsche 911 GT3 Cup (Type 997) cars which produce 450 bhp. The three tier championship splits drivers according to their racing experience. Professional drivers compete in the Pro class, with semi-professional and amateur drivers racing in either Pro-Am1 or Pro-Am2. From 2013, the Carrera Cup has held two races at each BTCC meeting.

Finally, the Renault Clio Cup UK allows aspiring touring car drivers to showcase their talent in this single make series, utilising Clio Renaultsport 200 cars. The championship awards three different titles for drivers. Along with the overall drivers' championship, younger rookie drivers can chase points for the Graduate Cup and older gentlemen drivers can seek points for the Masters Cup. During 2013, the Clio Cup will hold two races at all BTCC weekends except the rounds at Croft and Knockhill.

For 2020, the Renault Clio Cup UK has been replaced by the Mini Challenge, which joins from the British GT package. The Clio Cup has joined the British GT Package instead.

=== Previous support races ===
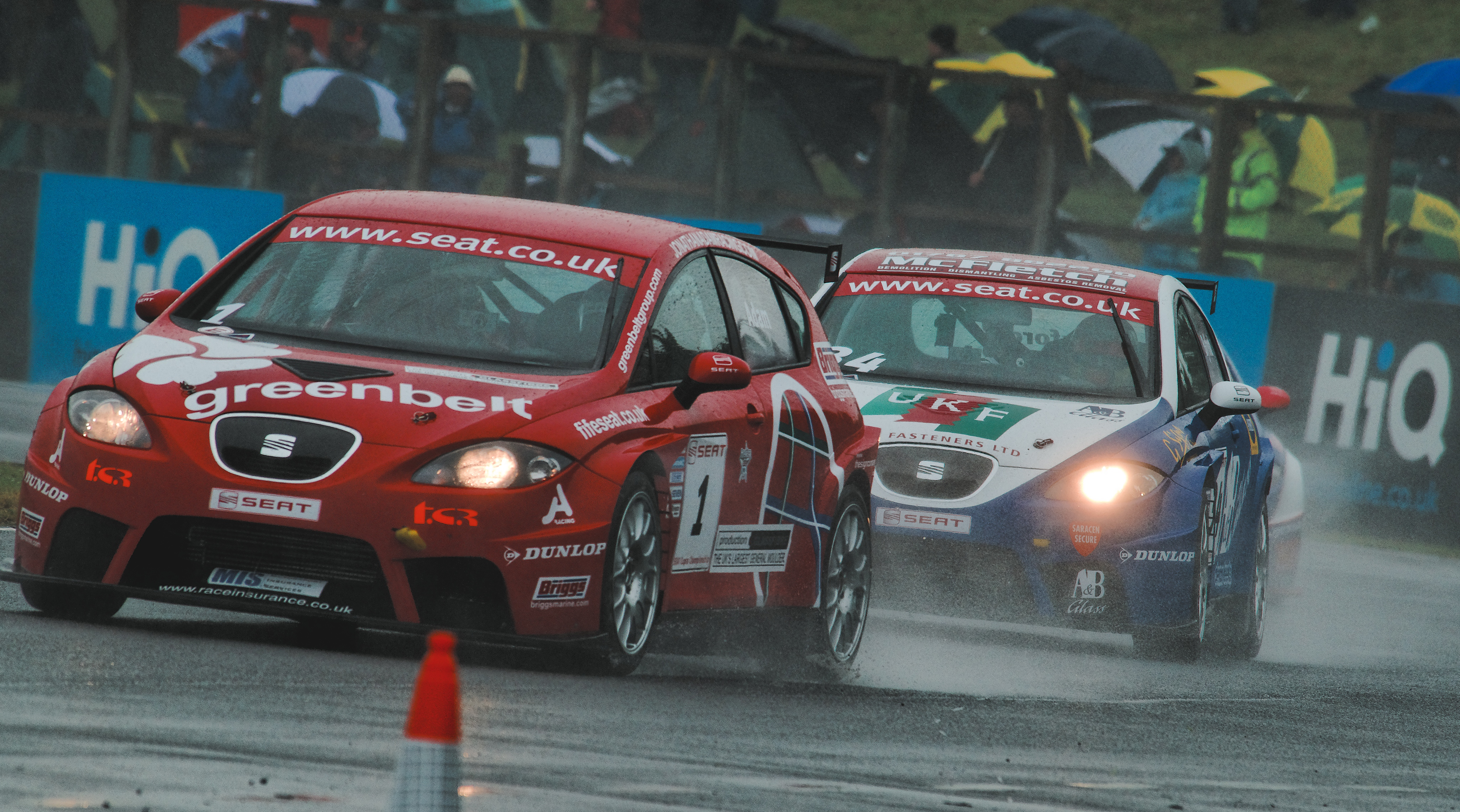
A SEAT Cupra Championship race, at Croft during 2008.

- Formula Renault UK - Early in 2012, the long supporting Formula Renault UK championship announced that it had cancelled its 2012 season after only receiving six entries and hoped to return for the 2013 season. However, it was reported in the media that the series was ended definitively in September 2012.
- SEAT Cupra Championship – was a one make series that ran for six years between 2003 and 2008, and as a support package to the BTCC between 2004 and 2008. The series folded after SEAT UK ended its racing activities.
- Formula BMW UK
- Renault Spider Cup
- Formula Vauxhall
- Formula Vauxhall Junior
- Lotus Elise Championship
- Vauxhall Vectra Championship
- Ford Fiesta Championship

== See also ==
- List of British Touring Car Championship records
