= Lloyd & Hill =

- Genre: Crime drama
- Created by: Jill McGown
- Written by: Richard Maher
- Directed by: Philippa Langdale
- Starring: Philip Glenister; Michelle Collins; Shaun Dingwall; John Light; Carol Starks; Lloyd Hutchinson; Hywel Bennett
- Country of origin: United Kingdom
- Original language: English
- No. of episodes: 1

Production
- Executive producers: Charles Elton; Jonathan Powell
- Producer: Lars MacFarlane
- Cinematography: John Daly
- Editor: Jon Costelloe
- Running time: 90 minutes
- Production company: Carlton Television

Original release
- Network: ITV
- Release: 3 October 2001

Lloyd & Hill (also known as Lloyd & Hill: A Shred of Evidence) is a British television crime drama film, written by Richard Maher, that first broadcast on ITV on 3 October 2001. The film, based upon the novel A Shred of Evidence by author Jill McGown, follows unconventional police detectives Danny Lloyd (Philip Glenister) and Judy Hill (Michelle Collins), as Judy transfers into an East Anglian squad run by Lloyd, her ex-Lover, and is assigned to the case of a strangled schoolgirl. The film gathered 6.95 million viewers on its debut broadcast.

Collins said of her role in the film; "I've always been on the other side of the law, since a very early appearance in The Bill, and it's been very exciting. However, I thought it would nice to be a police officer for a change!" The film was intended as a backdoor pilot for a potential series, although poor critical reception and average viewing figures resulted in the series not being picked up for a full run. The film was broadcast in the United States on BBC America on 16 January 2003, and has since been made available on streaming service Acorn TV. Notably, the film has never been released on VHS or DVD.

== Cast ==
- Philip Glenister as DCI Danny Lloyd
- Michelle Collins as DI Judy Hill
- Shaun Dingwall as Patrick Murray
- John Light as Colin Cochrane
- Carol Starks as Erica Cochrane
- Lloyd Hutchinson as DS Tom Finch
- Hywel Bennett as Dr. Freddie Marks
- Lee Turnbull as Dave Britten
- Hannah Chaudhry as Kim Walters
- Jade Williams as Hannah Ouspensky
- Ania Sowinski as Natalie Ouspensky
- Geoffrey Church as Victor Ouspensky
- Anna Everett as Alice Ouspensky
- Caroline Loncq as Trudy King
- Martin Gower as Max Morrison
- Christopher Villiers as Michael Hill
- Akbar Kurtha as DC Bob Sandwell
- Buffy Davis as DC Tricia Jones
- Andy Rashleigh as Sgt. George Miller
