= List of British Touring Car Championship records =

This is a list of records in the British Touring Car Championship since its establishment in 1958. Drivers who competed in the 2025 British Touring Car Championship season are highlighted in bold.

This page is accurate as of the conclusion of the 2024 season.

== Driver Records ==
=== Total number of race wins ===
	Driver	Seasons	Starts	Wins	Percentage
1	(United Kingdom) Jason Plato	1997–2001, 2004–2019, 2021–2022	666	97	14.6%
2	(United Kingdom) Colin Turkington	2002-2009, 2013-2024	605	77	12.7%
3	(United Kingdom) Matt Neal	1991–2020	735	63	8.6%
4	(United Kingdom) Andy Rouse	1973–1976, 1978–1994	233	60	25.8%
5	(United Kingdom) **Ashley Sutton**	2016-	324	56	16.7%
6	**(United Kingdom) Gordon Shedden**	2001, 2006–2017, 2021–2022, 2025-	446	54	12.1%
7	**(United Kingdom) Tom Ingram**	2014-	384	43	11.2%
8=	(France) Yvan Muller	1998–2005	202	36	17.8%
8=	(Switzerland) Alain Menu	1992–2000, 2007, 2014–2015	233	36	15.5%
8=	(United Kingdom) James Thompson	1994–2004, 2006, 2009, 2011	290	36	12.4%

=== Most wins in a season ===
	Driver	Season	Wins	Entries	Percentage
1=	(Switzerland) Alain Menu	1997	12	24	50.00%
1=	(United Kingdom) **Ashley Sutton**	2023	12	30	40.00%
3=	(France) Yvan Muller	2001	10	26	38.46%
3=	(France) Laurent Aïello	1999	10	26	38.46%
3=	(Italy) Fabrizio Giovanardi	2007	10	30	33.33%
6=	(United Kingdom) Andy Rouse	1988	9	13	69.23%
6=	(United Kingdom) Tommy Sopwith	1958	9	14	64.29%
6=	(United Kingdom) Jason Plato	2001	9	26	34.62%
9=	(Australia) Frank Gardner	1970	8	12	75.00%
9=	(United Kingdom) Robb Gravett	1990	8	13	61.54%
9=	(United Kingdom) Stuart Graham	1975	8	15	53.33%
9=	(Italy) Gabriele Tarquini	1994	8	21	38.10%
9=	(Germany) Frank Biela	1996	8	26	30.77%
9=	(United Kingdom) Matt Neal	2006	8	30	26.67%
9=	(United Kingdom) **Gordon Shedden**	2012	8	30	26.67%
9=	(United Kingdom) Jason Plato	2006, 2008, 2011, 2013	8	30	26.67%
9=	(United Kingdom) Jake Hill	2024	8	30	26.67%
9=	(United Kingdom) Colin Turkington	2014	8	30	26.67%

=== Most wins per circuit ===
Circuit	Driver	Wins
(United Kingdom) Brands Hatch	(United Kingdom) Jason Plato	26
(United Kingdom) Croft Circuit	(United Kingdom) Colin Turkington	14
(United Kingdom) Donington Park	(United Kingdom) Andy Rouse	12
(United Kingdom) Knockhill Racing Circuit	(United Kingdom) Jason Plato	10
(Republic of Ireland) Mondello Park	(France) Yvan Muller	6
(United Kingdom) Oulton Park	(United Kingdom) Jason Plato	11
(United Kingdom) Rockingham	(United Kingdom) Jason Plato	6
(United Kingdom) Rockingham	(United Kingdom) **Gordon Shedden**	6
(United Kingdom) Silverstone Circuit	(United Kingdom) Andy Rouse	18
(United Kingdom) Snetterton Motor Racing Circuit	(United Kingdom) Jason Plato	13
(United Kingdom) Thruxton	(United Kingdom) **Josh Cook**	10

=== Total number of Drivers' championships ===
	Driver	Titles	Seasons
1	(United Kingdom) **Ashley Sutton**	5	2017, 2020, 2021, 2023, 2026
2=	(United Kingdom) Andy Rouse	4	1975, 1983, 1984, 1985
2=	(United Kingdom) Colin Turkington	4	2009, 2014, 2018, 2019
4=	(United Kingdom) Bill McGovern	3	1970, 1971, 1972
4=	(Australia) Frank Gardner	3	1967, 1968, 1973
4=	(United Kingdom) Bernard Unett	3	1974, 1976, 1977
4=	(United Kingdom) Win Percy	3	1980, 1981, 1982
4=	(United Kingdom) Matt Neal	3	2005, 2006, 2011
4=	(United Kingdom) **Gordon Shedden**	3	2012, 2015, 2016
10=	(United Kingdom) Jack Sears	2	1958, 1963
10=	(United Kingdom) Richard Longman	2	1978, 1979
10=	(United Kingdom) Chris Hodgetts	2	1986, 1987
10=	(United Kingdom) John Cleland	2	1989, 1995
10=	(Switzerland) Alain Menu	2	1997, 2000
10=	(United Kingdom) James Thompson	2	2002, 2004
10=	(Italy) Fabrizio Giovanardi	2	2007, 2008
10=	(United Kingdom) Jason Plato	2	2001, 2010
10=	(United Kingdom) **Tom Ingram**	2	2022, 2025

== Manufacturer Records ==
=== Total number of race wins ===
As of Round 30 2024

	Manufacturer	Wins
1	(United States) Ford	291
2	(Japan) Honda	198
3	(Germany) BMW	177
4	(United Kingdom) Vauxhall	138
5	(United States) Chevrolet	80
6	(United Kingdom) Jaguar	51
7	(Japan) Toyota	45
8	(Spain) SEAT	44
9	(United Kingdom) MG	39
10	(France) Renault	38
11=	(South Korea) Hyundai	36
11=	(Japan) Nissan/Infiniti	36
13	(United Kingdom) Rover	33
14	(Japan) Subaru	22
15	(Sweden) Volvo	21
16	(Germany) Volkswagen	18
17	(United Kingdom) Triumph	14
18	(Germany) Audi	13
19	(United Kingdom) Austin	12
20	(Germany) Mercedes-Benz	11

=== Total number of Constructors' championships ===
	Driver	Titles	Seasons
1	(Germany) BMW	10	1991, 1993, 2016–2022, 2024
2	(United Kingdom) Vauxhall	**9**	1992, 2001–2005, 2007–2009
3	(Japan) Honda	**5**	2010-2013, 2015
4=	(France) Renault	**2**	1995, 1997
4=	(Japan) Nissan	**2**	1998–1999
4=	(United States) Ford	**2**	2000, 2023

=== Total number of winning driver championships by car manufacturer ===
	Driver	Titles	Seasons
1=	(United States) Ford	**10**	1959, 1963–1968, 1985, 1990, 2000, 2023
1=	(Germany) BMW	**10**	1988, 1991–1993, 2009, 2014, 2018–2019, 2024
2	(United Kingdom) Vauxhall	**8**	1989, 1995, 2001–2004, 2007–2008
3	(Japan) Honda	**7**	2005–2006, 2011–2013, 2015–2016
4	(United Kingdom) Austin	**5**	1958, 1960–1962, 1969

=== Constructor Championship finishes ===
Manufacturer	1990's									2000's										2010's										2020's						
Manufacturer	91	92	93	94	95	96	97	98	99	00	01	02	03	04	05	06	07	08	09	10	11	12	13	14	15	16	17	18	19	20	21	22	23	24	25	26
(Italy) **Alfa Romeo**				1st	8th																															
(Germany) **Audi**						1st	2nd	6th																												
(Germany) **BMW**	1st	2nd	1st	4th	6th	2nd																			3rd	1st	1st	1st	1st	1st	1st	1st	2nd	1st	3rd	
(United States) **Chevrolet**																				3rd	2nd															
(United States) **Ford**	4th		5th	3rd	4th	8th	7th	7th	6th	1st									3rd	2nd	3rd										2nd	2nd	1st	2nd	2nd	1st
(Japan) **Honda**					7th	5th	3rd	4th	2nd	2nd		3rd	2nd	2nd					2nd	1st	1st	1st	1st	2nd	1st	2nd	3rd	2nd	2nd	2nd		4th				
(South Korea) **Hyundai**																																3rd	3rd	3rd	1st	3rd
(Japan) **Infiniti**																									4th											
(Japan) **Mazda**		6th	8th	10th																																
(Germany) **Mercedes**																																				2nd
(United Kingdom) **MG**											NC	2nd	3rd									2nd	2nd	1st	2nd	4th	5th									
(Japan) **Mitsubishi**	6th																																			
(Japan) **Nissan**	5th	4th	4th	9th			5th	1st	1st																											
(France) **Peugeot**		5th	6th	6th	9th	7th	6th	8th			2nd																									
(Malaysia) **Proton**												4th	4th	4th																						
(France) **Renault**			7th	2nd	1st	4th	1st	3rd	4th																											
(Spain) **SEAT**														3rd	2nd	1st	2nd	2nd																		
(Japan) **Subaru**																										3rd	2nd	4th	4th							
(Japan) **Toyota**	3rd	3rd	3rd	7th	5th																								5th	3rd	3rd	5th	4th	4th	4th	4th
(United Kingdom) **Vauxhall**	2nd	1st	2nd	5th	2nd	6th	8th	5th	5th	3rd	1st	1st	1st	1st	1st	2nd	1st	1st	1st								4th	3rd	3rd							
(Sweden) **Volvo**				8th	3rd	3rd	4th	2nd	3rd																											
Manufacturer	91	92	93	94	95	96	97	98	99	00	01	02	03	04	05	06	07	08	09	10	11	12	13	14	15	16	17	18	19	20	21	22	23	24	25	26
Manufacturer	1990's									2000's										2010's										2020's						
