= Ant Anstead =

British television presenter, motor specialist and designer

- Born: Anthony Richard Anstead; 28 March 1979 (age 47); Plymouth, Devon, England
- Occupations: Television presenter, motor specialist, car builder, designer, artist
- Known for: For the Love of Cars; Wheeler Dealers
- Spouse: Louise Herbert (m. 2005; div. 2017) Christina Haack (m. 2018; div. 2021)
- Children: 3
- Website: ant-anstead.co.uk

Anthony Richard Anstead (born 28 March 1979) is an English television presenter, motor specialist, car builder, designer, and artist, best known for co-presenting the Channel 4 automotive show For the Love of Cars with Philip Glenister. From 2017–2021, Anstead replaced Edd China as co-host of the show Wheeler Dealers, (S.14–16) alongside Mike Brewer, during the filming and production at their US base.

== Early life ==
Anstead was born in Plymouth, Devon, England. He lived in Ely, Cambridgeshire, until he was 10, then moved with his family to Hertfordshire. He was educated at Richard Hale School, Hertford, then attended the nearby Haileybury School to complete his A-levels. At 16 Anstead built his first kit car and sold it immediately for a profit. He then bought an MG and so began his infatuation with cars.

== Early career ==
Anstead joined Hertfordshire Constabulary in 1999 and became a police constable first stationed at Bishop's Stortford. He moved to Cheshunt police station and then became a member of the tactical firearms team (TFU) in Welwyn Garden City. During his early police career, Anstead guarded John Duffy the convicted railway murderer for three days in a police safe house. He went on to receive two commendations for acts of bravery.

Anstead played semi-professional football for over 15 years playing over 700 matches at Ryman level, and made the transition from goalkeeper to striker.

== Television career ==
Anstead started his own television production company in 2014..

In his 2019 TV show Ant Anstead Master Mechanic, Anstead uses a variety of components, from spare parts to donor cars to hand-build a homage to the Alfa Romeo 158. The show sees Anstead work with a variety of automotive personalities and experts in the field.

=== Wheeler Dealers ===
In 2017, Anstead was offered a five-year contract to move with his family to the United States for Wheeler Dealers USA and to replace co-host and close friend Edd China, who had decided to return to the UK.

Three years later, production was transferred back to the UK without Anstead, as he has a young son, Hudson who is settled in the US with his second ex-wife Christina Haack with whom he shares custody.

== Personal life ==
He started dating American television personality Christina Haack in October 2017. On 22 December 2018, they married at their Newport Beach, California home. Their son was born in September 2019. The couple separated in September 2020 and divorced the following year.

In April 2021, Anstead began a relationship with American actress Renée Zellweger.

Anstead is patron of Harrison's Fund, a charity that supports research into Duchenne muscular dystrophy.

== Filmography ==
=== Television ===
Year	Title	Role	Channel
2014	For the Love of Cars	Presenter	Channel 4
2015	Building Cars Live	Presenter	BBC Two
2016	World's Most Expensive Cars	Presenter	Channel 4 BBC Worldwide
2016	The One Show	Presenter	BBC One
2016	Chinese New Year: The Biggest Celebration on Earth	Presenter	BBC Two
2016	New York: America's Busiest City	Presenter	BBC Two
2016	Craft: I Made This	Presenter	Channel 4
2016	The Lost Lotus: Restoring a Race Car	Presenter	Channel 4
2017–2020	Wheeler Dealers	Presenter	Motor Trend
2017	Britain's Greatest Invention	Presenter	BBC Two
2017	Craft It Yourself	Presenter	Channel 4
2017	Sunday Brunch – Live	Presenter	Channel 4
2018	Barrett-Jackson Live Auto Auction	Presenter	Discovery Channel
2019	Ant Anstead Master Mechanic	Presenter	Motor Trend
2019	Christina on the Coast	Presenter	HGTV
2020	World's Greatest Cars	Presenter	Sky
2021–present	Celebrity IOU: Joyride	Presenter	Discovery+
2024	Ant Anstead: Born Mechanic	Presenter	Quest

== Bibliography ==
- Cops and Robbers: The Story of the British Police Car, HarperCollins UK, 2018, ISBN 9780008245061
- Petrol Head Parenting: The Essential Guide to Diagnosing and Nurturing a Petrol Head, Great Flood Publishing, 2018, ISBN 9780692195543
