= Philip Glenister =

British actor (born 1963)

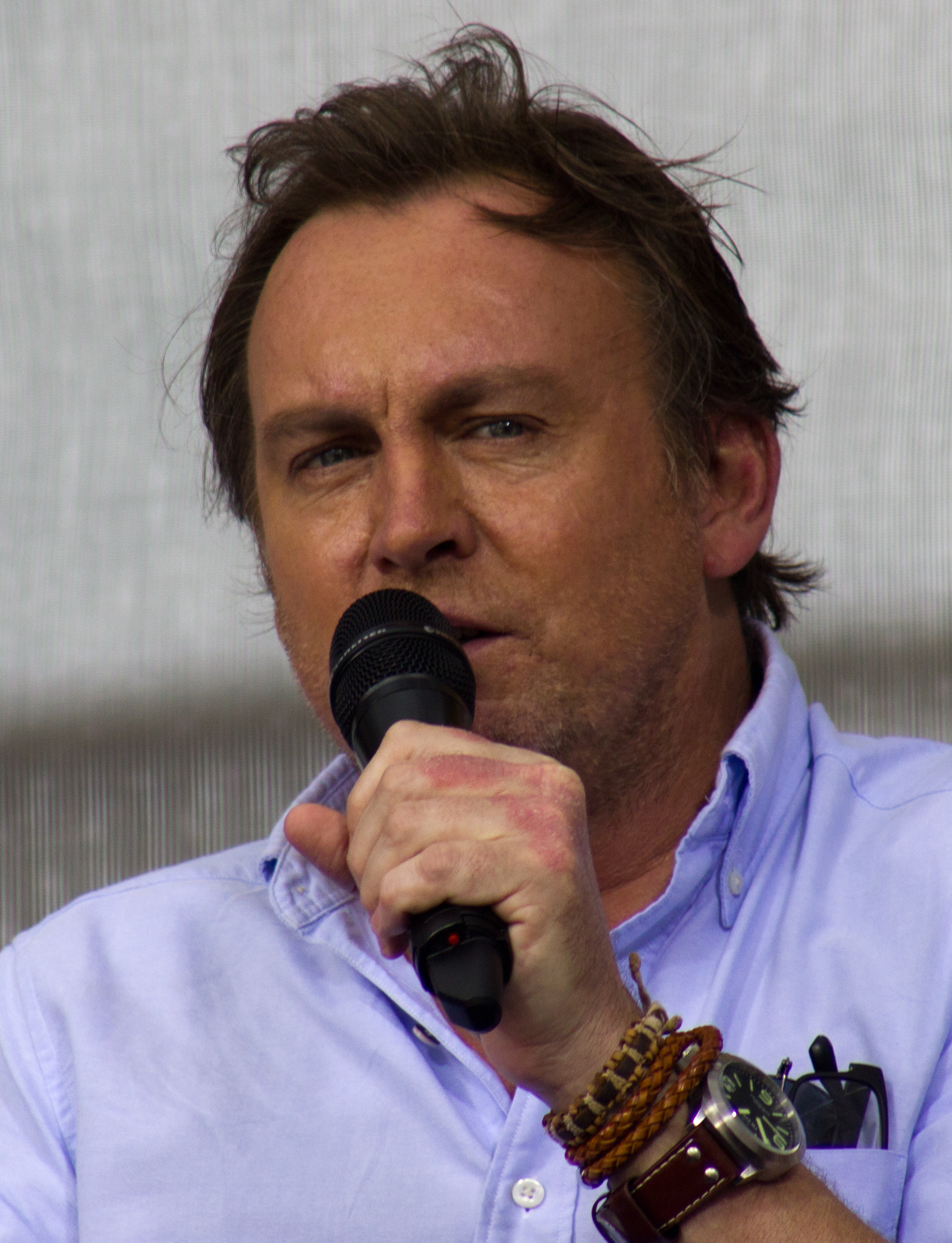
- Glenister in 2016
- Born: Philip Haywood Glenister; 10 February 1963 (age 63); Harrow, Middlesex, England
- Education: Royal Central School of Speech and Drama
- Occupation: Actor
- Years active: 1990–present
- Spouse: Beth Goddard (m. 2006)
- Children: 2
- Parent(s): John Glenister; Joan Fry Lewis
- Relatives: Robert Glenister (brother)

Philip Haywood Glenister (born 10 February 1963) is an English actor. He is known for his role as DCI Gene Hunt in the BBC series Life on Mars (2006–2007) and its sequel Ashes to Ashes (2008–2010). He also played DCI William Bell in State of Play (2003) and Reverend Anderson in Outcast (2016–2018).

== Early life and education ==
Glenister was born on 10 February 1963 in Harrow, Middlesex, and grew up in Hatch End. He is the son of director John Glenister and Joan Fry Lewis, and the younger brother of fellow actor Robert Glenister.

He attended Hatch End High School.

In his early career, he worked as a runner for the Robert Stigwood Organisation. Following this, he worked until the age of 23 as a film publicist, but developed an interest in acting after watching his brother perform in a student play about the Sex Pistols. With the encouragement of his then-sister-in-law, Amanda Redman, he pursued acting and attended the Central School of Speech and Drama.

== Career ==
In the early 1990s, Glenister appeared in various TV series including Minder, The Ruth Rendell Mysteries, Heartbeat, The Chief, Dressing for Breakfast and Silent Witness. In 1997, he appeared in Sharpe's Justice as Richard Sharpe's half-brother Matt Truman. He played William Dobbin in the 1998 mini-series Vanity Fair.

From 1998 to 1999, Glenister co-starred as a mini-cab driver who aspires to be a rock star in the series Roger Roger. He also played factory boss Mack Mackintosh in the first three series of Clocking Off from 2000 to 2002. In 2001, he appeared in two of the Hornblower TV films as Horatio's antagonist Gunner Hobbs.

Glenister played the photographer who took nude photos for a Women's Institute fundraising calendar in the 2003 feature film Calendar Girls. Also in 2003, he appeared in the mini-series State of Play. Glenister played the German commandant, Baron Heinrich von Rheingarten, in the 2004 mini-series Island at War about the Occupation of the Channel Islands during World War II.

In April 2006, Glenister read the Bedtime Story for the BBC's children's channel, CBeebies. He returned to the slot in February/March 2007.

Glenister played social reformer and estate manager Mr Carter in the 2007 BBC costume drama Cranford, as part of a cast including Judi Dench and Francesca Annis.

Glenister is probably best known for his role as DCI Gene Hunt in Life on Mars (2006–07), co-starring with John Simm as Sam Tyler, and its sequel Ashes to Ashes (2008–10), with Keeley Hawes as Alex Drake. Glenister also worked with Simm on State of Play and Clocking Off and the 2008 crime film Tuesday. Upon announcement of the film, Glenister joked that he and Simm were contractually obliged to work with each other once a year.

Glenister starred as demon hunter Rupert Galvin in the 2009 ITV drama Demons. He used an American accent for the role, which received some criticism from reviewers. After the series was cancelled, he said he had problems with the role and felt that he may have been miscast.

In 2010, Glenister had a small role (credited as 'Poker Friend') in Woody Allen's You Will Meet a Tall Dark Stranger, and he played Charles Forestier in a 2011 feature film of Guy de Maupassant's Bel Ami. He starred in the 2011 conspiracy thriller Hidden on BBC One.

In 2011, Glenister reunited with John Simm once more in the Sky TV mini-series Mad Dogs about a group of old friends whose holiday in Mallorca takes an unexpected turn. After a successful reception, the cast returned for a second run of the series in 2012. The show ran for two more series after that in 2013. Those two series consisted of four and two episodes respectively. Glenister played Captain Smollett in Sky1's adaptation of Treasure Island, broadcast at Christmas 2012. Glenister also appeared in the 2012 premiere of the play This House.

In 2013, Glenister played Sir William Boyd-Carrington in the final episode of Agatha Christie's Poirot, starring David Suchet, entitled "Curtain". He also played the role of Mr Trevor Gunn, a lothario PE teacher in David Walliams' BBC One comedy series Big School.

In 2014, Glenister had a leading role in the Kudos-produced BBC drama, From There to Here, which focuses on the aftermath of the IRA bombing of Manchester in 1996. The show featured his Life on Mars co-star Liz White as his love interest. That same year, he presented the Channel 4 series For The Love Of Cars with fellow classic car enthusiast Ant Anstead. The pair were set the challenge of restoring classic cars including a Mini Cooper, Land Rover, DeLorean, MG T-type, Ford Escort and a Triumph Stag. The first series ended after six episodes, in which all six classic cars were sold at a London auction, with the second series being aired in 2015.

Also in 2014, Glenister starred in an advertising campaign for energy price comparison service Uswitch.

In 2016, Glenister had a leading role in Robert Kirkman's TV adaptation of Outcast, where he played Reverend Anderson, and used an American accent. The show ran for two series on Cinemax, before it was cancelled in 2017.

In 2017, Glenister appeared in an episode of Inside No. 9 called The Bill. He also worked with his Clocking Off co-star, Lesley Sharp in Living the Dream. This show was about a British family who moved to America. It ran for 2 series before being cancelled in 2019. That year, Glenister presented the true-crime show, What the Killer Did Next on Crime & Investigation.

Glenister appeared in Julian Fellowes' 2020 television adaptation Belgravia, based on Fellowes' novel of the same name. It aired on ITV in the UK and Epix in the USA.

== Publications ==
A book by Glenister on 1970s and 1980s culture, Things Ain't What They Used to Be, was published in October 2008.

== Charity work ==
Glenister is patron of the charity Momentum in Kingston upon Thames, which aims to help children and the families of children undergoing treatment for cancer in Surrey.

== Personal life ==
Glenister has been married to actress Beth Goddard since 2006. They have two daughters.

Glenister is a supporter of non-league football team Wealdstone FC. He is also known to be a fan of Arsenal FC.

== Filmography ==
=== Film ===
Year	Title	Role
1995	I.D.	Charlie
2003	Calendar Girls	Lawrence
2005	Kingdom of Heaven	Squire
2008	Tuesday	Earp
2010	You Will Meet a Tall Dark Stranger	Poker Friend
2012	Bel Ami	Charles Forestier

=== Television ===
Year	Title	Role	Notes
1991	Minder	Greg Hunter	Episode: "Whatever Happened to Her Indoors"
1991	The Ruth Rendell Mysteries	Brian Gregson	Episode: "Murder Being Once Done"
1991	Drop the Dead Donkey	Harrison	Episode: "George's Daughter"
1991	Bergerac	Philip	Episode: "All for Love"
1992	Love Hurts	Mark	2 episodes
1992	Heartbeat	Julian Cantley	Episode: "Face Value"
1992	A Fatal Inversion	Young Detective	2 episodes
1993	The Detectives	Uniformed Officer	Episode: "Hostage"
1993	In Suspicious Circumstances	Herbert Bennett	Episode: "Good as Gold"
1994	Law and Disorder	David MacNamara	Episode: "Safe as Houses"
1994	The Chief	Angus Shadwell	Series 4, Episode 8
1994	Blue Heaven	Paul Twice	Series 1, Episode 6
1995	Loved Up	Ray	TV film
1995	Dressing for Breakfast	Mark	Episode: "Mark"
1996	True Love	Phil	TV film
1996	Silent Witness	PC Jerry Denning	Episodes: "Darkness Visible"
1996	Frontiers	DS Danny Curtis	TV mini-series
1996	Soldier Soldier	Jimmy Reece	Episode: "All for One"
1996–1999	My Wonderful Life	Phil	20 episodes
1997	The Perfect Blue	Tom	TV film
1997	Have Your Cake and Eat It	Joe Martin	Mini-series
1997	Sharpe's Justice	Matt Truman	TV film
1997	Wycliffe	DS Eric Findlay	Episode: "Dance of the Scorpions"
1998	Vanity Fair	William Dobbin	TV mini-series
1998–1999	Roger Roger	Phil	Series 1–2
2000–2002	Clocking Off	James 'Mack' Mackintosh	Series 1–3
2001	Lloyd & Hill	DCI Danny Lloyd	TV film
2001	The Hunt	Rob Campbell	TV film
2002	Hornblower	Gunner Hobbs	2 episodes
2003	The Other Boleyn Girl	William Stafford	TV film
2003	State of Play	DCI William Bell	Mini-series
2003	The Vice	Jason Grant	Episode: "Lust"
2003	Byron	William Fletcher	TV film
2004	Island at War	Oberst Heinrich Baron Von Rheingarten	Mini-series
2005	The Stepfather	Dougie Molloy	TV film
2005	The Walk	Eddie	TV film
2005	Last Rights	Speers	TV mini-series
2005	Vincent	DCI David Driscoll	Series 1, Episodes 1–3
2006–2007	Life on Mars	DCI Gene Hunt	
2007	Cranford	Mr Carter	TV mini-series
2007	The Catherine Tate Show	Police Officer	2007 Christmas Special
2008–2010	Ashes to Ashes	Gene Hunt	
2009	Demons	Rupert Galvin	Mini-series
2011	Hidden	Harry Venn	Mini-series
2011–2013	Mad Dogs	Quinn	
2012	Treasure Island	Captain Smollet	Mini-series
2013	Agatha Christie's Poirot	Sir William Boyd-Carrington	Episode: "Curtain"
2013–2014	Big School	Trevor Gunn	Television sitcom series
2014	Jumbo: The Plane that Changed the World	Documentary	Narrator
2014	From There to Here	Daniel Cotton	TV series
2014–2016	For the Love of Cars	Presenter	Documentary series
2015	Prey	David Murdoch	3 episodes
2016	The Hollow Crown	Lord Talbot	Episode: Henry VI, Part 1
2016	The Level	Frank Le Saux	Mini-series
2016–2017	Outcast	Reverend Anderson	20 episodes
2017	Inside No. 9	Craig	Episode: The Bill
2017–2019	Living the Dream	Mal Pemberton	12 episodes
2019	What the Killer Did Next	Presenter	Documentary series
2019–present	The Rubbish World of Dave Spud	Betty Spud (voice)	All episodes except "Two Toots Spud"
2020	Belgravia	James Trenchard	Mini-series
2022	Carthago	Lord Davidson	TV series
2023	Steeltown Murders	DCI Paul Bethell	Lead role
2023	Foundation	Commdor Argo	Season 2
2024	After the Flood	Jack Radcliffe	Main role
2025	Bergerac	Arthur Wakefield	In Production
2026	The Lady	DCI Douglas	Mini-series

=== Audio ===
Year	Title	Role
2013	The Minister of Chance	The Summer King
