= Mini (Mark I) =

First version of British Motor Corporation's Mini

Mini Mark I
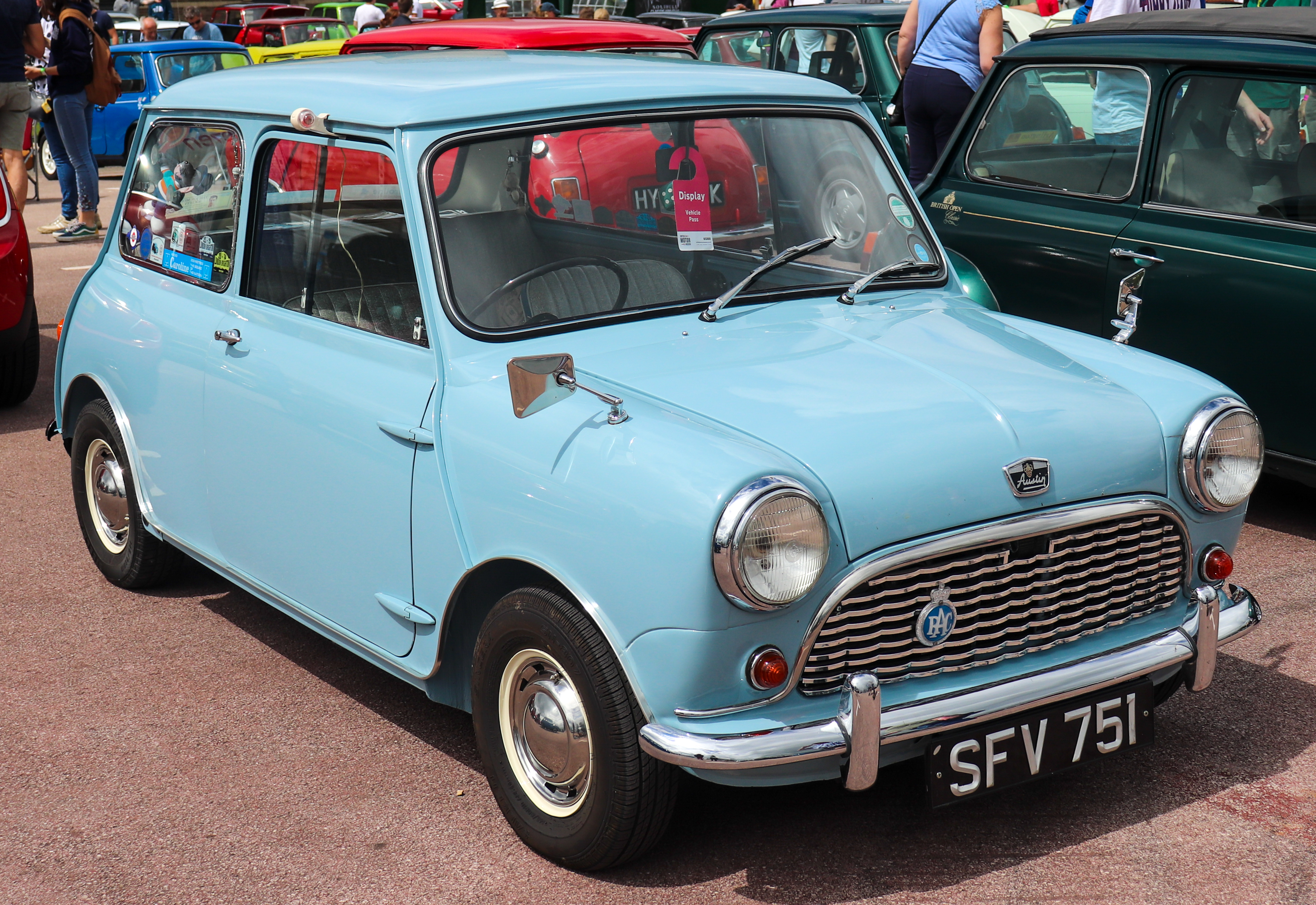
- 1960 Austin Seven Mini

Overview
- Manufacturer: British Motor Corporation
- Also called: Austin Seven; Austin 850; Morris Mini Minor; Morris 850
- Production: 1959–1967
- Assembly: United Kingdom: Longbridge, Birmingham (Longbridge plant); Ireland: Dublin; Australia: Zetland; Belgium: Seneffe; Portugal: Setúbal
- Designer: Sir Alec Issigonis

Body and chassis
- Class: City car (A)
- Body style: 2-door saloon 2-door estate 2-door van 2-door truck
- Layout: FF layout

Powertrain
- Engine: 848 cc (51.7 cu in) A-Series I4; 970 cc (59.2 cu in) A-Series I4; 997 cc (60.8 cu in) A-Series I4; 998 cc (60.9 cu in) A-Series I4; 1,071 cc (65.4 cu in) A-Series I4; 1,098 cc (67.0 cu in) A-Series I4; 1,275 cubic centimetres (77.8 cu in) A-Series I4
- Transmission: 4-speed manual with synchromesh on top three ratios till 1968. Synchromesh on all forward speeds after 1968; 4-speed automatic 5-speed manual (some models only)

Dimensions
- Wheelbase: Estate: 2,140 mm (84.3 in); Saloon: 2,040 mm (80.3 in)
- Kerb weight: 1959: 585 kilograms (1,290 lb)

Chronology
- Successor: Mini Mark II

The Mark I Mini (1959–1967) was the first version of British Motor Corporation's Mini model. It is characterised by its sliding windows, external door hinges and "moustache" grille. In the United Kingdom the Mark I was produced between 1959 and 1967 at the Longbridge Plant near BMC's headquarters, with production in Australia continuing until 1970. The Mini Mark I was sold under both Austin and Morris marque names.

== Design ==
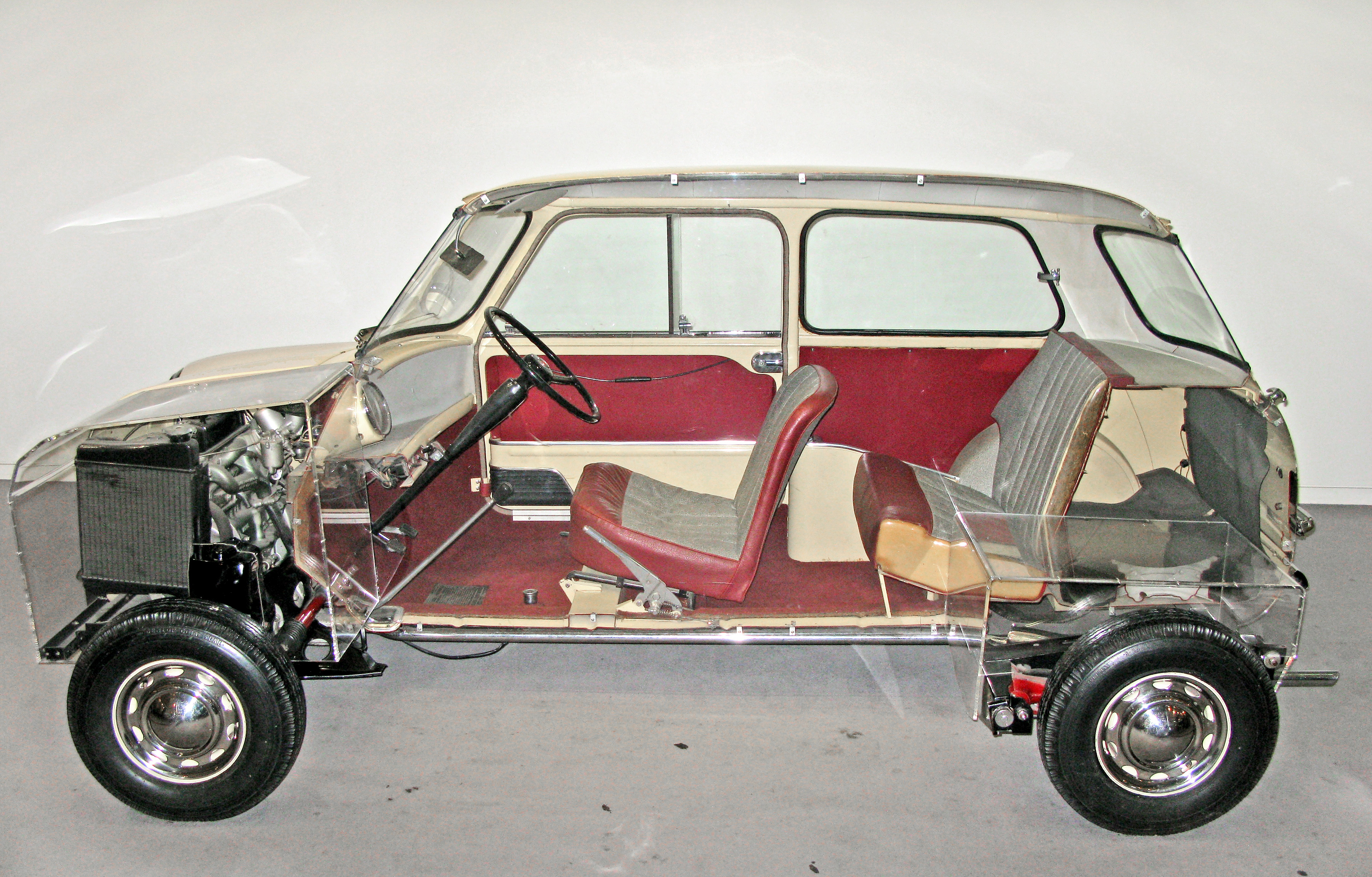
A cutaway model of an early Mini in the Science Museum in London.

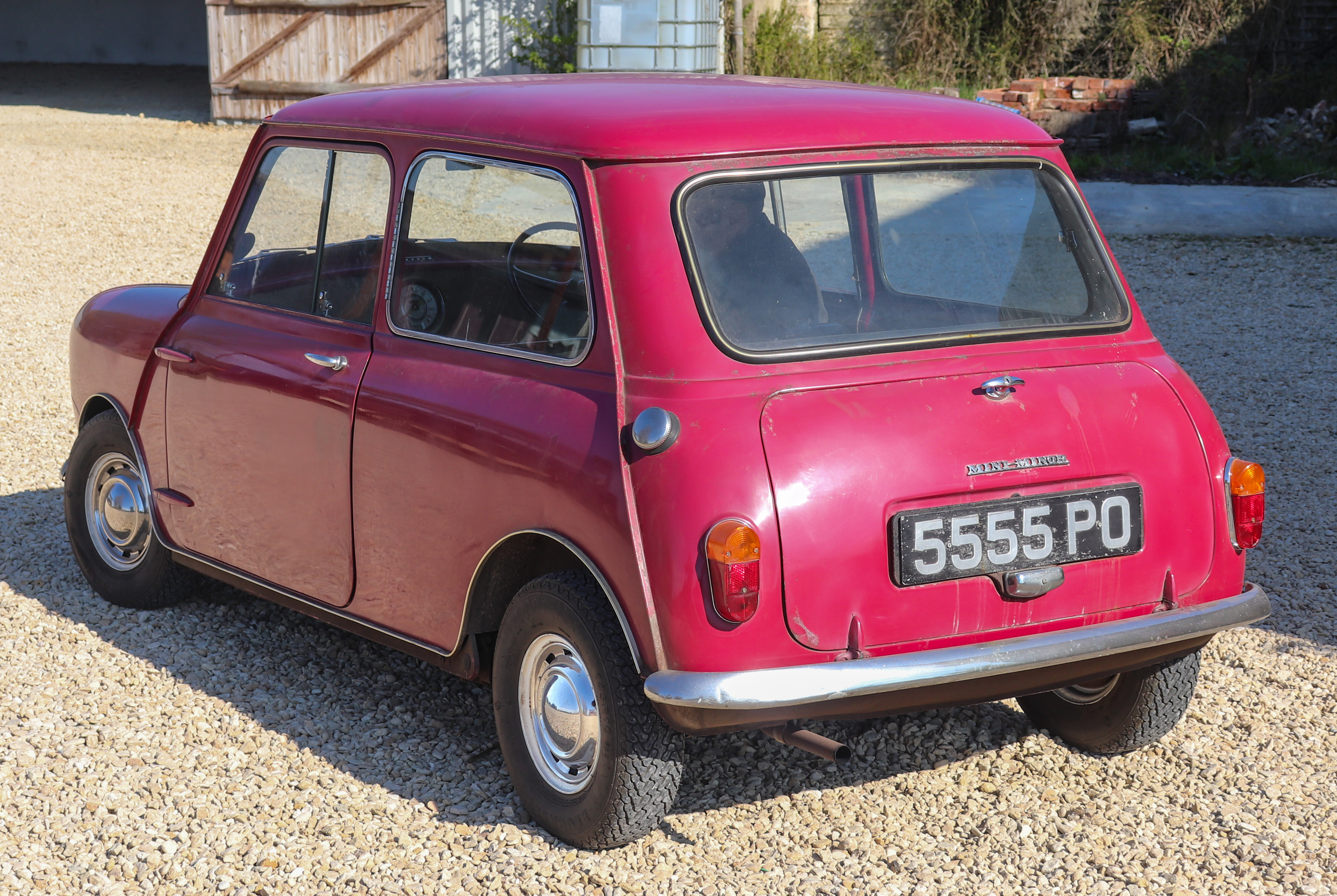
Morris Mini-Minor rear

Designed as project ADO15 (Austin Drawing Office 15), the first models were marketed with the names Austin Seven (often written as SE7EN) and Morris Mini-Minor in England. Until 1962, they appeared as the Austin 850 and Morris 850 in some export markets. The production model differed from the original prototype (affectionately named "The Orange Box" because of its colour) due to the addition of a modified front subframe, on which the engine was mounted, and by the engine being mounted with the carburettor at the back, rather than at the front, as in the prototype, to reduce wear on the gearbox.

The proposed engine size was originally 948 cc as used in the Morris Minor and Austin A35. However, Leonard Lord, chairman of BMC thought that the 90 mph (140 km/h) top speed was excessive and thus reduced the engine size to 848 cc to gain a more manageable speed (for the time) of 72 mph (116 km/h). Issigonis' suspension featured the use of rubber cones as springs: the spring rate of rubber changes with compression, allowing the suspension to adapt to passenger load variations (a full passenger load could actually double the tiny vehicle's gross weight). A conventional suspension would have required an increase in height to the design. This unique design was adapted from Issigonis's home-built racer and built for the Mini by Alex Moulton.

The Mini was a genuine four seater. This was possible within such a small bodyshell because the engine was mounted transversely, driving the front wheels via a gearbox which was uniquely incorporated into the sump of the engine. Engine and gearbox thus shared the same oil, which was a significant piece of design in response to the 1956 Suez Crisis and the fears of future oil shortages. The overall width of the vehicle was reduced, because there was no need to accommodate a separate gearbox across the width of the car and because there was no transmission tunnel in the floorplan of the Mini, there was more space that could be used to accommodate the passengers thus compensating for the reduced width. Overall length was minimized because of the Mini's two-box design, comprising only a passenger compartment and the engine compartment. There was no third box providing a separate luggage compartment (i.e. a boot) and that inevitably compromised luggage space. To offset that problem, large bins beside each of the four seats provided some useful interior storage and a centrally located instrument binnacle allowed the dashboard to be opened up for storage too. The requirement for storage bins in the front doors effectively determined that the Mini should have sliding windows rather than wind-up windows. The tiny 10-inch (250 mm) wheels helped to reduce the intrusion of wheel arches into the interior of the vehicle and allowed a modest amount of additional luggage space in a "boot" area behind the rear seats. Overall the Mini represents some very clever packaging.

== Performance ==
An Austin de luxe saloon was tested by the British magazine The Motor in 1959. It had a top speed of 72.4 mph (116.5 km/h) and could accelerate from 0–60 mph (97 km/h) in 27.1 seconds. A fuel consumption of 43.5 mpg_{‑imp} (6.49 L/100 km; 36.2 mpg_{‑US}) was recorded. The test car cost £537 including taxes of £158.

== Cooper and Cooper S ==
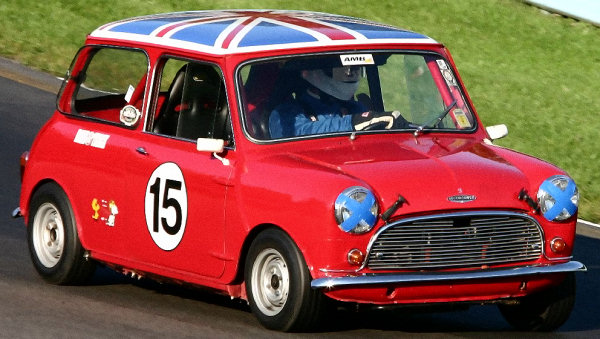
1964 Austin Cooper S at the 2004 Watkins Glen SVRA

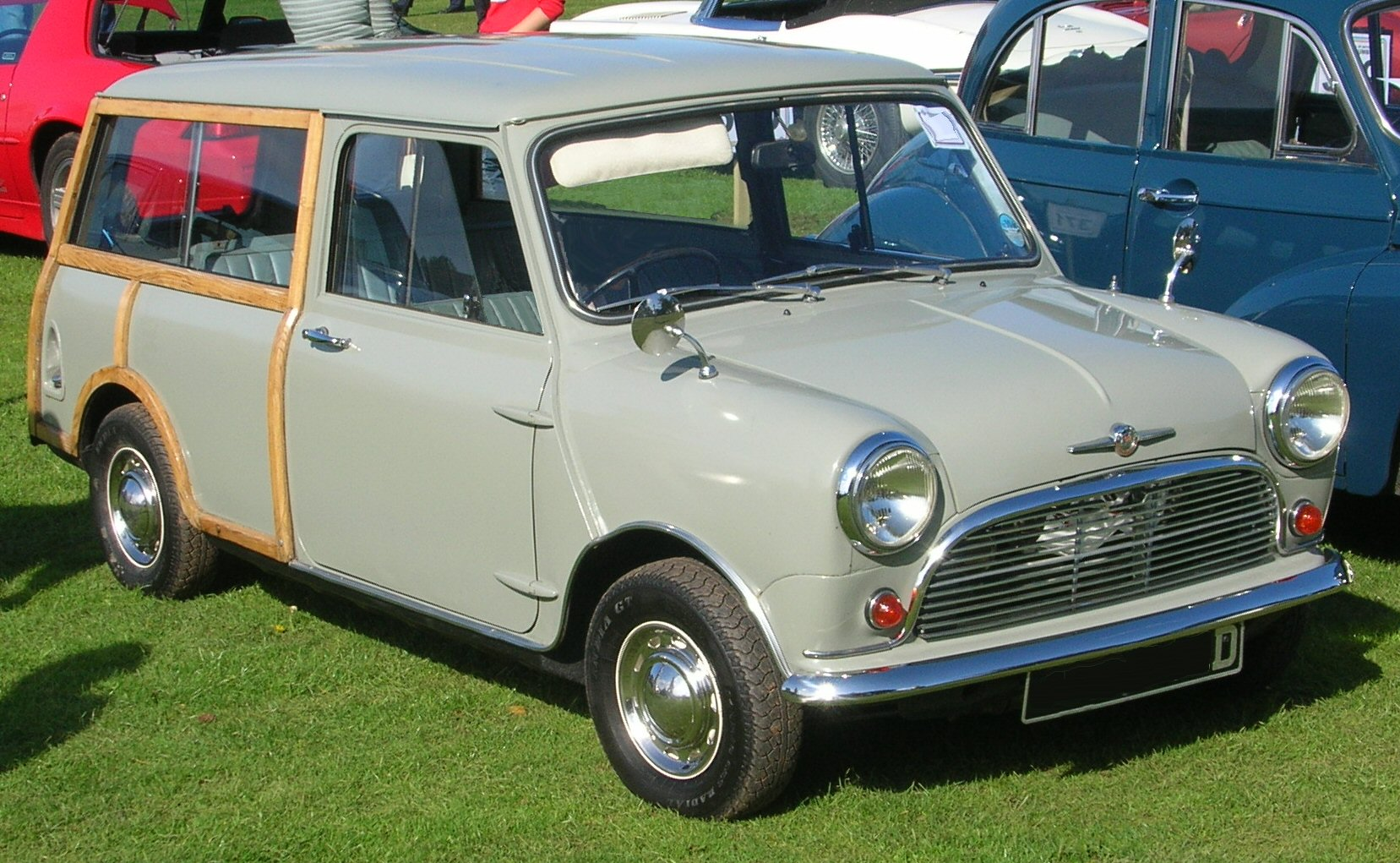
1966 Morris Mini-Traveller (Mark I)

Issigonis' friend John Cooper, owner of the Cooper Car Company and Formula One Manufacturers Champion in 1959 and 1960, saw the potential of the little car, and after some experimentation and testing, the two men collaborated to create a nimble, economical, and inexpensive car. The Austin Mini Cooper and Morris Mini Cooper debuted in September 1961.

The original 848 cc (0.8 L; 51.7 cu in) engine from the Morris Mini-Minor was increased to 997 cc (1.0 L; 60.8 cu in), boosting power from 34 bhp (25 kW) to 55 bhp (41 kW). The car featured a tuned engine, twin HS2 SU carburettors, and 7 in (18 cm) disc brakes, a first at the time in a small car. 1,000 of this iteration were commissioned by management, intended for and designed to meet the homologation rules of Group 2 rally racing. The 997 engine was replaced by a shorter stroke 998 cc (1.0 L; 60.9 cu in) unit in 1964. By the time production of the Cooper model ended in 1967, 12,274 of these popular cars had been sold to the public. A more powerful Mini Cooper, dubbed the "S", was developed in tandem and released in 1963. Featuring a 1,071 cc (1.1 L; 65.4 cu in) engine and larger disc brakes, 4,030 Cooper S' were produced and sold until the 1,071 cc (1.1 L; 65.4 cu in) model was discontinued in August 1964. Cooper also produced two models specifically for circuit racing, rated at 970 cc (1.0 L; 59.2 cu in) and a 1,275 cc (1.3 L; 77.8 cu in), both of which were also offered to the public. The smaller engine model was purely to homologate for racing in sub-1000cc capacity classes, only 961 were built with 970 cc engines and the model was discontinued in April 1965. The 1,275 cc (1.3 L; 77.8 cu in) engined models continued through the Mk2 Mini, finally being killed off in 1971 in the Mk3 bodyshell.

The Cooper S version was also used by some British police departments and the Australian Traffic police as a plainclothes car. The engine was a 1,275 cc (1.3 L; 77.8 cu in) BMC A-series Inline-4 OHV 2 valves per cylinder, producing a maximum power of 76 bhp (57 kW; 77 PS) @ 6000 rpm and a maximum torque of 79 lb⋅ft (107 N⋅m) @ 3000 rpm.

== Upgrades ==
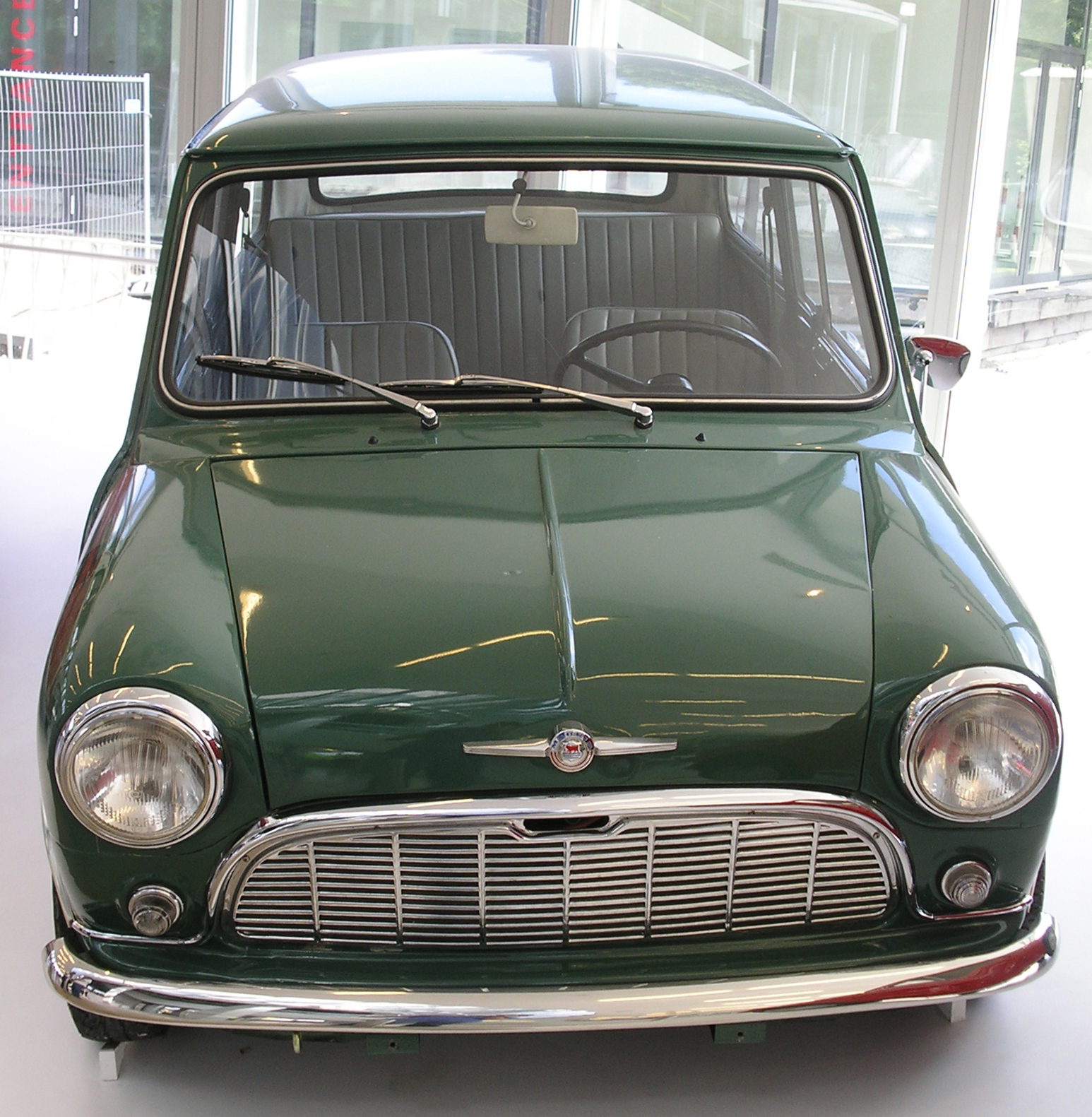
An Almond Green Mark I Morris Mini Minor

The suspension in all UK models was replaced by a Hydrolastic system in 1964. The new suspension created a softer ride, but it also increased weight and production cost; in 1969 the original rubber suspension reappeared except on 1275 GT, Clubman and Cooper S models. Many other production changes occurred over the life of the Mark I Mini.

In Australia, 1965 saw the release of the redesigned Australian Morris Mini Deluxe. The new model featured redesigned doors with conventional interior handles and wind up windows (with quarter vents), hydrolastic suspension, key operated starter, a remote gearshift mechanism (like the Cooper) and the engine was upgraded to the 998 cc version. Production of the Australian Morris Mini Deluxe continued until 1969 when it was replaced with another Australian only model, the Mini K the "K" stands for Kangaroo. The K received the more powerful 1098 cc engine (from the Morris 1100) as well as 4-speed synchromesh transmission and upgraded instruments. It was claimed that the Mini K was produced with 80% local content. Both of the Australia only round-nosed minis were based on the UK Mark I Mini with the production changes from the Mark II Mini never being used in Australia. Production of the round-nosed mini in Australia halted in 1970 with the release of the new Mini Clubman. The Australian Mini Clubman used the same locally designed wind up windows and exterior door hinges as the Morris Mini Deluxe. The Australian Mini had wind up windows many years before their British counterparts.

== Mark I Mini production changes for UK built cars ==
Chassis numbers for production changes are given in italics, where necessary in the format Austin/Morris

=== 1959 ===
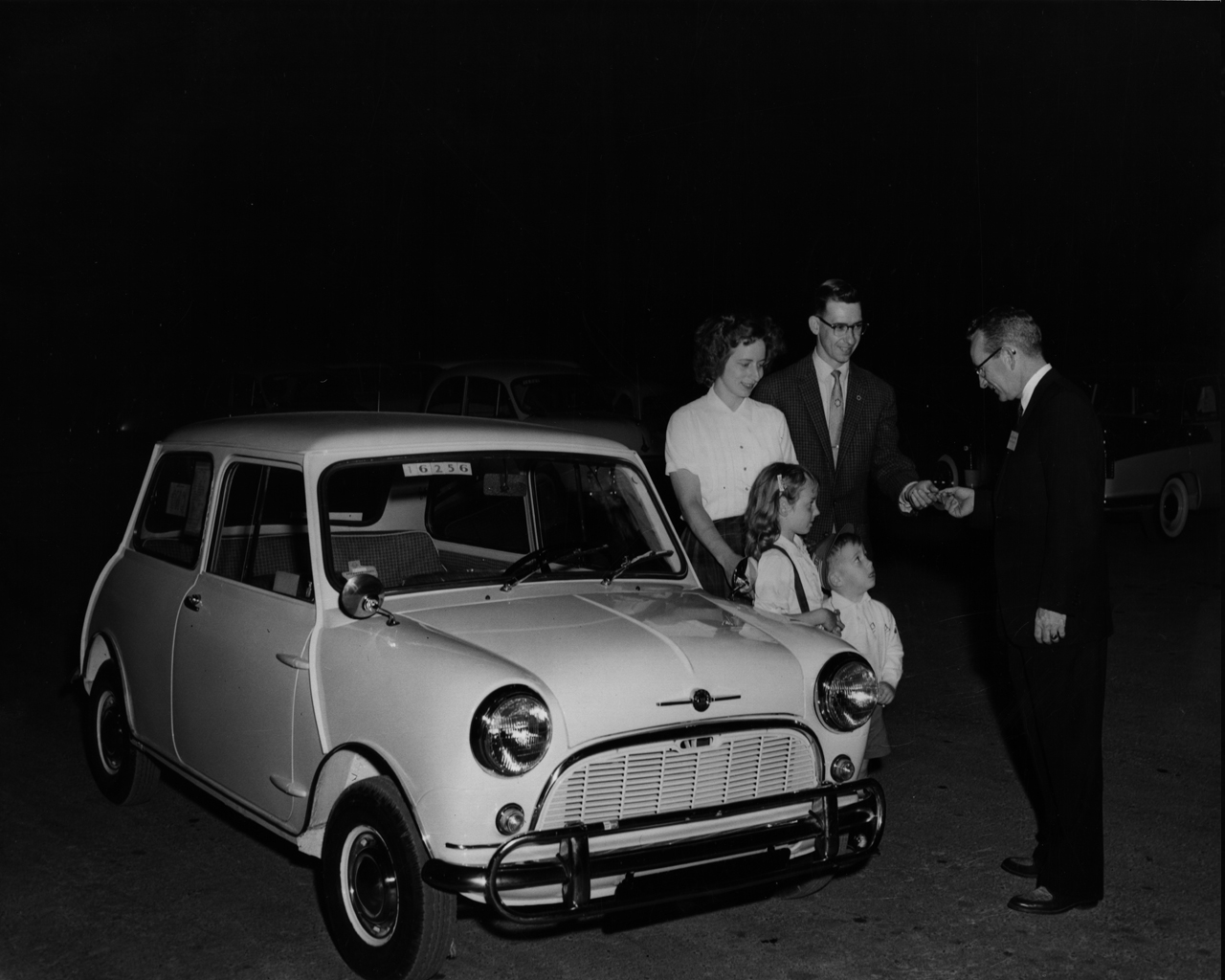
An eager family buys the first Morris Mini-Minor sold in Arlington Texas. The uniquely designed car was met with widespread public acceptance.

- 26 August 1959 – 101 – The first Mini launched, the Austin Seven and Morris Mini-Minor
- August – 4232/4093 – Split radiator cowl
- August – 5488/5537 – Pivoting quadrant on radius arm for handbrake cable
- August – 10151/11670 – Castor angle changed from 1.5 to 3 degrees
- December – Interior trim changes for the Austin Seven

=== 1960 ===
- January – 10502 – Modified window catches
- February – 14215 – Morris Only. Improved trim, Improved dampers, fuel tank drain plug, modified window catches
- March – 19126 – First Countryman
- April – 26590/24831 – Drive shafts modified
- May – Mini van announced
- September – 19101 – Wood framing available on Countryman/Traveller
- October – 58698 – Austin Seven upgraded to Feb Morris spec
- Late 1960 – Recessed panels around front and rear screens introduced

=== 1961 ===
- Sep 1961 – Mini Cooper launched
- Late 1961 – Riveted wheels replaced with welded

=== 1962 ===
- 01/01/1962 – Austin Seven rebadged Austin Mini, metal oil filler cap replaced with plastic

=== 1963 ===
- May 1963 – Chrome window catches and 10 hole runners replaced with plastic catches and 2 hole runners
- June 1963 – Upper seat belt mounts in the B-pillar lowered 4.5"

=== 1964 ===
- Jul 1964 – 'Cutout' front panel added
- Sep 1964 – Courtesy light switches added to A-panel
- Sep 1964 – Hydrolastic suspension introduced
- Oct 1964 – Seat mounting brackets gained 3-point adjustments

=== 1965 ===
- Oct 1965 – In 1965 an AP (Automotive Products) four-speed automatic transmission as an alternative. Amazingly, it was little bigger than the original unit and so was able to occupy the same space. As a motoring program from the time reported, "You can still change the gears manually or you can put the lever into the bottom of the gate and car changes itself. BMC call it the his-or-hers system, for equal appeal for men or women drivers: it's the first automatic transmission ever offered on such a small car."

=== 1966 ===
- Jan 1966 – Safety boss added to external door handles

=== 1967 ===
- Oct 1967 – Mark I replaced by Mark II

== Production date stamps ==
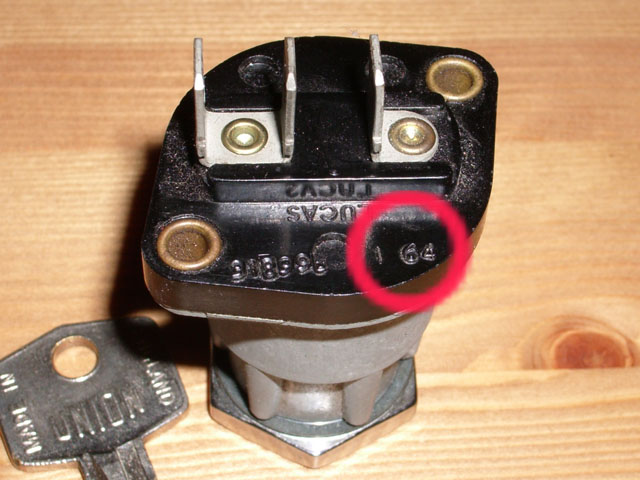
A typical datestamped component (circled)

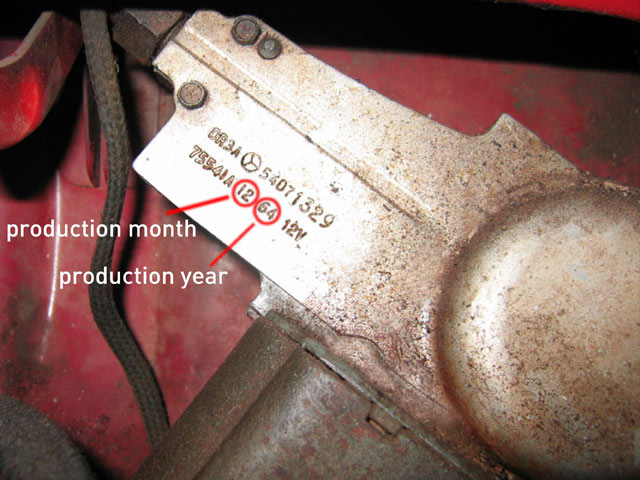
The wiper motor is the easiest to date

Certain components fitted to Mark I cars were stamped with the date on which they were made. This is in the format of month/year, like 1/62 for January 1962. These dates can be useful for working out the age of a specific car, or for judging how original it is. The following components are known to be date stamped in this manner:

- bootlid lock
- brake drums
- coil
- distributor
- dynamo
- floor start button
- fusebox
- glass (using the Triplex system of placed dots under the letters)
- headlamp bowls
- horn push surround
- ignition switch
- indicator arm
- light dip switch
- light switch
- regulator
- starter
- wiper motor
- wiper switch

== See also ==
- Mini – For details of this and other Mini models
