= Les Leston =

British racing driver and businessman (1920–2012)

- Born: 16 December 1920; Bulwell, Nottinghamshire, England
- Died: 13 May 2012 (aged 91); Bexhill-on-Sea, East Sussex, England

Formula One World Championship career
- Nationality: (United Kingdom) British
- Active years: 1956 – 1957
- Team(s): Connaught, Cooper, BRM
- Entries: 3 (2 starts)
- Championships: 0
- Wins: 0
- Podiums: 0
- Career points: 0
- Pole positions: 0
- Fastest laps: 0
- First entry: 1956 Italian Grand Prix
- Last entry: 1957 British Grand Prix

Alfred Lazarus Fingleston (16 December 1920 – 13 May 2012), better known as Les Leston, or in full Leslie Leston, was a British racing driver, born in Bulwell, Nottinghamshire.

== Early life ==
Leston was the second son of Harry Fingleston, a coal factor from Milton Chambers, Nottingham, and his wife Kate or Kitty, née Fine, his elder brother being Dennis Leston the entomologist.

In his early life, Leston was a successful drummer for the jazz band The Clay Pigeons. He also served in WW2 as a mid-upper gunner in an Avro Lancaster.

In 1939 before the outbreak of war, Leston was the shopkeeper for fancy and toilet goods as part of the family business, and soon after the war finished he and his father "Monty" (otherwise Henry or Harry) set up a successful aeronautical accessories business, Aero Spares, a company involved in a variety of technical appliances made for war planes.

== Racing career ==
Leston started racing in a Jaguar SS100 before acquiring a 500cc Cooper and his own Leston Special. He won the Luxembourg Grand Prix in 1952 (a race containing Stirling Moss and Peter Collins), and became a Cooper works driver in 1954 winning the British Formula Three championship in the same year. He participated in three Formula One World Championship Grands Prix, debuting on 2 September 1956, but scored no championship points. He participated in the 1955, 1957 and 1960 Le Mans 24 Hour races, but failed to finish in the first two of those, and was unclassified in 1960. However, in 1961, Leston achieved his best result in the event, finishing 11th overall in a Triumph TR4S. He was entered into the 1962 Le Mans by Colin Chapman to co-drive with Tony Shelly in a Lotus 23, but the race organizer, ACO, denied the entry in the famous Lotus Le Mans debacle.

From 1958 to 1960, Leston had a successful stint in a Riley 1.5 becoming British Saloon Car champion in Class B as well as campaigning the car in the Monte Carlo Rally and using it as a daily run about for business and pleasure.

Leston was most famous for driving the famous DADIO - a Lotus Elite. His duels with Graham Warner in LOV1 have gone down in British racing history. He would become British GT Champion in this car and have many victories.

== Life outside racing ==
After surviving a crash at Caen in 1958 in which his Formula Two Lotus caught fire following an engine seizure, Leston increasingly focused on his motor accessories, an area for which he later became well known. Through Les Leston Accessories, he marketed aftermarket automotive parts such as steering wheels and gear levers. The company's steering wheels where manufactured in Walsall and Leston was among the early figures associated with the development of the aftermarket motoring accessories industry.

It was after receiving burns in the crash in Caen (where he leapt from the car at 90 mph) that Leston pioneered the marketing of flameproof overalls. At the time, many racing drivers wore short sleeved shirts - Leston's fame and connection to all the great Formula One drivers meant that very soon a lot of them were wearing Les Leston overalls. Graham Hill appeared regularly in Leston's adverts in such overalls, also sporting the Leston-made Graham Hill rally master jacket.

In the late 1960s, Leston became a Formula One pit reporter for the BBC, until he was replaced by Barrie Gill.

In the 1970s, Leston lived in Hong Kong, where he was married twice and expanded his merchandising business sourcing-in from China the giveaways, etc., that were rewards for incentives such as submitting cereal-box tops. His lifestyle involved owning a large cruiser that he would take out to sea at weekends and a jazz radio show. He frequented the bar of the Foreign Correspondents' Club, and for leisure he rode a BMW 1,200 cc motor bike.

== Racing record ==
=== Complete Formula One World Championship results ===
(key)

Year	Entrant	Chassis	Engine	1	2	3	4	5	6	7	8	WDC	Points
1956	Connaught Engineering	Connaught Type B	Alta Straight-4	ARG	MON	500	BEL	FRA	GBR	GER	ITA; Ret	NC	0
1957	Cooper Car Company	Cooper T43	Climax Straight-4	ARG	MON; DNQ	500	FRA					NC	0
1957	Owen Racing Organisation	BRM P25	BRM Straight-4					GBR; Ret	GER	PES	ITA	NC	0

=== Complete British Saloon Car Championship results ===
(key) (Races in bold indicate pole position; races in italics indicate fastest lap.)

Year	Team	Car	Class	1	2	3	4	5	6	7	8	9	10	11	DC	Pts	Class
1958	Les Leston	Riley 1.5	B	BRH	BRH	MAL; 5†	BRH	BRH	CRY	BRH	BRH; 4	BRH; 3			?	?	**3rd**
1959	Les Leston	Riley 1.5	B	GOO; 6	AIN ?	SIL; 10	**CRY**; 3	SNE; Ret	BRH; 4†	BRH; Ret†					**3rd**	**38**	**1st**
1960	Les Leston	Volvo 122S	1001-1600cc	BRH	SNE; DNS	MAL	OUL	SNE	BRH	BRH; 7*	BRH ?*				NC*	0*	
1961	Leston Racing	Volvo 122S	B	SNE ?	GOO; DNS	AIN	SIL	CRY	SIL	BRH	OUL	SNE			29th	4	8th
1963	Alan Fraser Racing Team	Sunbeam Rapier Series IIIA	B	SNE; 15	OUL	GOO; 13	AIN ?	SIL	CRY	SIL					19th	12	7th
1963	John Willment Automobiles	Ford Cortina GT	B								BRH; 13	BRH	OUL	SNE	19th	12	7th

† Events with 2 races staged for the different classes.

- Car over 1000cc - Not eligible for points.
