= Gawaine Baillie =

British racing driver, industrialist, philatelist (1934–2003)

Sir Gawaine Baillie Bt
- Gawaine Baillie wearing his racing helmet
- Born: 8 March 1934
- Died: 21 December 2003 (aged 69)
- Occupations: Racing driver Industrialist; Philatelist
- Known for: British Saloon Car Championship; HPC Engineering; Philately

Sir Gawaine George Hope Baillie, 7th Baronet (8 March 1934 – 21 December 2003) was a British amateur motor racing driver, engineer, industrialist, stamp collector, and the owner of the estate surrounding Leeds Castle, the ancient fortress in Kent. The castle itself was bequeathed to the nation upon his mother's death in 1974. After his death, it was discovered that he had amassed, almost entirely in secret, one of the greatest collections of stamps of the former British Empire.

== Early life ==
Sir Gawaine was raised at Leeds Castle, the ancient fortress in Kent that his mother Lady Baillie (née Olive Cecilia Paget), a Whitney heiress, had bought with her sister Dorothy Paget in 1928. At age five, after World War II broke out, Baillie went to live with his American cousins, the Whitney family. Soon after returning to England, his father (Sir Adrian Baillie, 6th Baronet) died on 8 January 1947, and he succeeded to the family title, becoming 7th Baronet of Polkemmet, Linlithgowshire.

Following education at Sandroyd School, Eton and Cambridge, he created HPC Engineering in 1959, a company which specialises in sub-contract manufacturing for the automotive, aerospace, computer, defence, medical and machine tool industries. He served as chairman and managing director of the company for the rest of his life. He was also an amateur race car driver, competing in numerous championships against Stirling Moss, Mike Hawthorn and Jackie Stewart. After retiring from motor racing, he returned to his boyhood hobby of collecting stamps.

== Racing career ==
Sir Gawaine's driving career began in 1956, when he first started racing a Lotus Eleven sports car. By 1958, he became a member of the Equipe Endeavour team, earning several wins in a Jaguar Mark 1 including the John Davy Trophy at Brands Hatch as part of the inaugural British Saloon Car Championship season. By 1960, Sir Gawaine had purchased a Lotus Elite and entered several rounds of the World Sportscar Championship, including his first attempt at the 24 Hours of Le Mans.

In 1961, Sir Gawaine entered the Tour de France automobile competition, finishing second in the touring car category. The following year, he crashed his Jaguar MkII during the same competition and fell 100 ft (30 m) down a hillside, emerging with numerous cuts to his face. Sir Gawaine returned to the British Saloon Car Championship the following year, now campaigning an American-built Ford Galaxie. The Galaxie was also transported to Australia in 1964, where Sir Gawaine and Lex Davison entered the Sandown 6 Hour International.

After Sir Gawaine's Australian tour with the Galaxie, he purchased a Ford Mustang for the 1965 British Saloon Car Championship, he finished second in the class championship behind his teammate Roy Pierpoint. In 1966 he finished first in class with a Ford Falcon which benefited from his expertise in supercharging. By 1967 Sir Gawaine had retired from racing.

== Stamp collecting ==
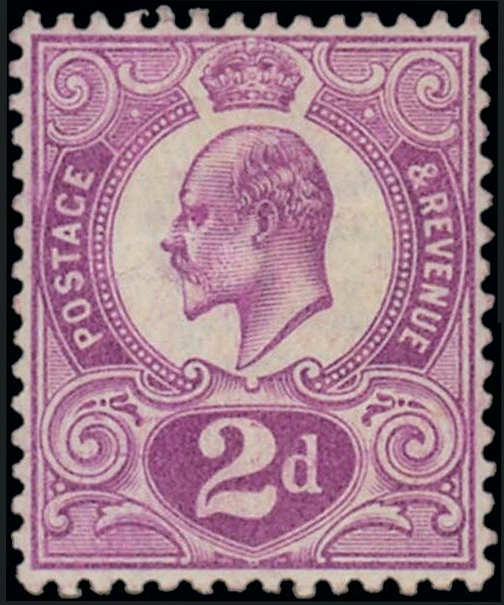
Baillie owned a copy of this 2d Tyrian plum stamp

Sir Gawaine's goal in stamp collecting was to build a comprehensive collection of postage stamps from Great Britain and the British Empire, starting with the earliest issues of Queen Victoria through to the modern day. Sir Gawaine was interested in only the most perfectly preserved stamps and his collection is distinguished from others of comparable scale by his exacting standards. He mastered at least ten areas of specialisation and acquired over 100,000 stamps, of the highest quality including a copy of the scarce Edward VII 2d Tyrian plum. The collection was considered the most comprehensive of its kind. When Sotheby's put the stamps up for auction after his death, the collection was described as the most important to be sold in more than 50 years. Sotheby's divided the stamps into ten separate auctions, the first nine of which exceeded the initial estimate of £11m, by more than £4m.

== Personal life ==
In 1966, he married Margot Beaubien, the daughter of Senator Louis-Philippe Beaubien of Montreal. They had a daughter, Liza (born 1969), and a son, Adrian (born 1973), who upon his father's death became Sir Adrian Louis Baillie, 8th Baronet.

== Racing record ==
=== Complete British Saloon Car Championship results ===
(key) (Races in bold indicate pole position; races in italics indicate fastest lap.)

Year	Team	Car	Class	1	2	3	4	5	6	7	8	9	10	11	DC	Pts	Class
1958	Equipe Endeavour	Jaguar 3.4-Litre	D	BRH; 2†	BRH; 2‡	MAL; 1†	BRH; 2†	BRH; 2†	CRY; 2	BRH; 2	BRH	BRH			?	?	?
1959	Equipe Endeavour	Jaguar 3.4-Litre	D	GOO; 3	AIN; 3	SIL; 3	GOO; 2	SNE; 1	BRH; 1†	BRH; 2†					?	?	?
1960	Gawaine Baillie	Jaguar Mk II 3.8	+1600cc	BRH	**SNE**; 1*	MAL			BRH; 3*	BRH	BRH				NC*	0*	
1960	Gawaine Baillie	Lotus Elite	GT -1600cc				OUL; 2*	SNE							NC*	0*	
1961	Gawaine Baillie	Jaguar Mk II 3.8	D	SNE; 1	GOO; 4	AIN; 5	SIL ?	CRY; 3	SIL; DNS	BRH; 5	OUL	SNE ?			15th	14	5th
1962	Gawaine Baillie	Jaguar Mk II 3.8	D	SNE; 5	GOO; 5	AIN; 6	SIL	CRY; 3	AIN; 3	BRH; 4	OUL				16th	10	5th
1963	John Willment Automobiles	Ford Cortina GT	B	SNE	OUL	GOO	AIN ?								25th	8	NC
1963	John Willment Automobiles	Ford Galaxie	D					SIL ?	CRY; 4†	SIL; 2	BRH; Ret	BRH	OUL	SNE	25th	8	9th
1964	Gawaine Baillie	Ford Galaxie	D	SNE; 3	GOO; DNS	OUL; 2	AIN; 2	SIL; 4	CRY; 5†	BRH; 4	OUL				5th	24	**2nd**
1965	Gawaine Baillie	Ford Mustang	D	BRH; 5	OUL; 2	SNE; 3	GOO; 7	SIL; 2	CRY; 5†	BRH; 5	OUL; Ret				6th	32	**2nd**
1966	Gawaine Baillie	Ford Falcon Sprint	D	SNE; 4	GOO ?	SIL; 2	CRY; 4†	BRH; 3	BRH; Ret	OUL; 2	BRH; 3				5th	34	**1st**

† Events with 2 races staged for the different classes.

‡ Event with 3 races staged for the different classes.

- Car over 1000cc - Not eligible for points.

Baronetage of the United Kingdom
Preceded by Adrian Baillie	Baronet (of Polkemmet); 1947–2003	Succeeded by Adrian Baillie
