= Jeff Uren =

British racing driver (1925–2007)

- Nationality: (United Kingdom) British
- Born: Jeffery Macandrew-Uren; 17 October 1925 Brentford, England
- Died: 6 April 2007 (aged 81) Exeter, England

British Saloon Car Championship
- Years active: 1958–1963
- Teams: Jeff Uren; Ford Motor Company; John Willment Automobiles
- Starts: 19
- Wins: 0 (9 in class)
- Poles: 0
- Fastest laps: 5
- Best finish: 1st in 1959

Championship titles
- 1959 1959: British Saloon Car Championship; BSCC - Class C

Jeffery Macandrew-Uren (17 October 1925 – 6 April 2007), was a British engineer, racing driver, race team manager, tuner, customiser, and entrepreneur. He won the British Saloon Car Championship in its sophomore year. He was a driver and team manager for Ford Motor Company's rallying efforts, team manager with John Willment's racing division, and team manager for AC Cars' 1964 Le Mans team. He later created a series of performance-oriented engine-swapped custom Ford models.

== Early years ==
Uren was born on 17 October 1925 in Brentford, Middlesex. He had four siblings. He was raised in Cornwall, and was of Cornish descent.

While working for Ruston-Bucyrus demolishing World War II (WWII) air raid shelters in London, Uren met demolition contractor Charles Willment. Later Uren and his brother Douglas started a contract plant hire business, leasing out heavy equipment.

== Racing career ==
=== Rallying ===
Uren's first direct exposure to racing in general and rallying in particular came after preparing a car for brother Douglas and teammate Donald Bain to drive in the Monte Carlo Rally held in mid-to-late January, 1955, and then becoming a late addition as co-driver. The team entered an Armstrong Siddeley Sapphire.

Uren appeared several more times in the Monte Carlo Rally. He partnered with Douglas for appearances in 1956 and 1958. He was teamed with Ian Walker in 1959, and with Tommy Wisdom in 1962. He made an appearance in the RAC Rally the same year, driving with Wisdom again in a Cortina 1200 registered as TOO 528, the first appearance of the model in a rally. Also in 1962, at the request of Triumph's public relations department, Uren partnered with Wisdom as a fourth Triumph team in the Coupe des Alpes in Triumph TR4 6VC, a car normally kept as a spare. The pair finished eleventh.

Uren's involvement in the 1963 Monte Carlo Rally was in the role of team manager rather than driver. In 1964 he made another appearance in the Monte Carlo Rally, driving with Constantine John Manussis in a Ford Cortina GT.

Uren appeared in other rallys, including the 1957 Tulip Rally partnered with Douglas in a Jaguar 2.4. He also made two appearances in the East Africa Safari Rally: in 1960 driving with Mike Armstrong the team finished second in class, while in the 1961 event he and Armstrong finished third in class. He finished fifth in class at the 1960 Rally to the Midnight Sun (Midnattssolsrallyt) in Sweden.

=== Saloon and sports car racing ===
In 1955, both Uren brothers became active in saloon car racing. While often appearing in the same events, Jeff became a professional driver, while Douglas remained an amateur.

In 1956, Uren bought Ian Walker's Ford Prefect. The car had been prepared by John Willment, son of Charles, and later received a Willment Powermaster inlet-over-exhaust cylinder head conversion designed by Bob Yeats. Uren and Willment partnered as "Scuderia Throttollo Bendori" to field the car. The two later ran a Ford Anglia 100E, also with the Willment cylinder head. Although they talked about forming a more formal racing team, the two men eventually parted ways to focus on their respective businesses; Willment and his Ford dealership, and Uren and his plant hire business.

In the late 1950s, Uren ran some races in Jaguar models. He drove a 2.4 L in the Sprints at Brands Hatch in 1957. He also drove a 3.4 Mk1, as did his brother Douglas.

Uren drove a Ford Zephyr MkII in the inaugural season of the British Saloon Car Championship (BSCC) in 1958, finishing sixth on points and achieving the first win in a Ford at Mallory Park. In 1959 he became champion in the second year of the BSCC driving an upgraded Zephyr with a Raymond Mays aluminium cylinder head fitted with triple carburettors in Group C, finishing ahead of the works Ford drivers.

For the 1961 season, Uren drove a GSM Delta sports racing car to several class wins.

In 1963, Uren became the chairman of a committee formed by the British International Saloon Car Racing Drivers to represent the drivers' interests and concerns to other groups that included racing clubs, promoters, the automotive industry, and the Royal Automobile Club (R.A.C.).

Uren raced competitively in saloon and GT events until 1964. He held class lap records at Aintree, Goodwood, Brands Hatch, and Snetterton in his Zephyr. He continued racing in various historic race events until 2000.

== Racing team manager ==
=== Ford ===
In 1959, Uren was appointed Competition Manager for Ford of Britain's Dagenham Rally Team, originally on a consulting contract basis with a one year term.

As part of their Total Performance programme in the early 1960s, Ford's US division asked their NASCAR associate Holman-Moody to field a team of three Ford Falcons and six drivers in the 1963 Monte Carlo Rally, and hired Uren to manage the project.

=== Willment Racing ===
In November 1962, John Willment established the Willment Racing Division of the John Willment Automobiles (JWA) company, with Uren as manager. It was hoped that success on the track would create publicity for Willment’s Ford agencies, and increase sales of its line of performance parts. Willment's racing organisation was later renamed Race Proved by Willment, in part as a concession to Uren and his interest in producing speed equipment.

Uren negotiated an arrangement with Ford for Willment to receive three Lotus Cortinas as well as one 1963 American Ford Galaxie 500. The Galaxie was a lightweight full race 'R-Code' car prepared by Holman-Moody, with a four speed manual transmission and 7.0 L (427 cu in) V8 engine. While in the US to take delivery of the car Uren was taken for a demonstration drive at speed by Holman-Moody's driver "Fast Freddy" Lorenzen. Uren hired Jack Sears to drive the Galaxie, which ended Jaguar's dominance of the BSCC series.

Over the course of several years, the Willment team fielded a variety of cars that included AC Cobra roadsters, a Lola, Lotus 23 and Lotus 30 sportscars, an Elva Mark Seven, several Formula Three (F3) Lotuses, a Formula Two (F2) Brabham, a Formula One (F1) Brabham-BRM, and the specially built Willment Coupé based on plans for the Shelby Daytona coupe supplied to Willment by Shelby American with modifications by Frank Gardner, built on an unnumbered chassis bought from AC Cars and generally referred to as CSX2131.

=== AC Cars ===
AC Cars built their own Cobra coupé to race at the 1964 24 Hours of Le Mans, and brought Uren in to manage the effort. The car, designated A-98, was designed by Alan Turner, who managed to produce a car 8 in (203 mm) lower than Pete Brock's Daytona coupe by increasing the rake of the windscreen and lowering the roof. An uproar was caused in the British parliament when it was discovered that the team had done high-speed testing of the car on the M1 motorway during the early morning hours.

At Le Mans, the car was driven by the team of Jack Sears and Peter Bolton. On its seventy-eighth lap, with Bolton driving, one of its tyres blew out, causing it to collide with a Ferrari 275P. A-98 then crossed the run-off area and struck three young spectators, killing them. Bolton suffered only minor injuries. The car was later rebuilt.

== Bespoke automobiles ==
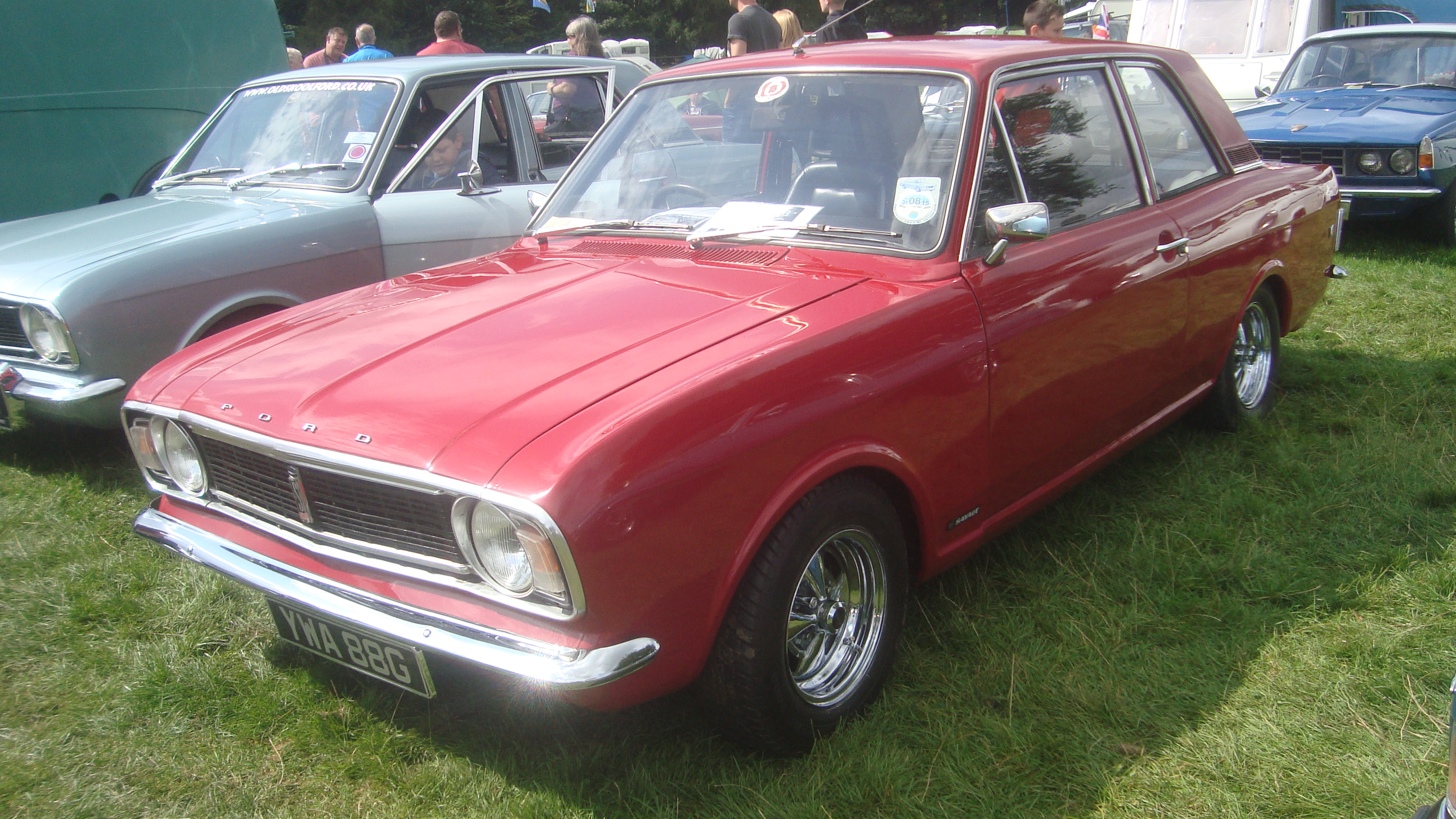
Mk2 Cortina Savage

In 1966 John Willment left to establish J.W. Automotive Engineering (JWAE) with John Wyer. JWAE took over construction of the Ford GT40 from Ford Advanced Vehicles, as well as the racing operation. In 1967 Uren established his own tuning company, called Race Proved Performance and Racing Equipment Ltd. in Hanwell. Later advertising also referred to Jeff Uren Ltd. for sales of complete cars.

While with the Willment organisation, Uren was involved in the development of the Willment Sprint GT Mk1 Cortina, which his own companies continued to produce after going independent.

Among his best known conversions were the 3.0 L Essex V6-powered Cortina Savage, and the Boss 302 5.0 L V8 race-engined Capri Stampede.

Uren's companies developed the following vehicles, with the indicated engine upgrades:

- Cortina Savage - 3.0 L Essex V6
- Cortina Cheetah - 2.5 L Essex V6
- Capri Comanche - 3.0 L Essex V6
- Capri Stampede - 5.0 L Ford Boss 302 V8
- Escort Navajo - 2.0 L Pinto I4
- Escort Apache - 3.0 L Essex V6
- Granada Seneca - 3.0 L Essex V6
- Transit Easipower - 3.0 L Essex V6
- Transit Sprite Motor home - 3.0 L Essex V6

Uren's companies are believed to have built a total of 1,700 vehicles, the majority of which, at between 1,000 and 1,100 examples, were Cortina Savages.

== Later years ==
After retiring from the automobile industry, he established Jeff Uren's Gracious Living. This company was involved in commercial building design and decor, importing ceramics, among other items, from Italy.

In the late 1990s or early 2000s, Uren bought a Ford Zephyr to build into a replica of his British Touring Car Championship car.

== Personal life ==
Uren was married to Penelope Vaughan (Penny) Macandrew-Uren at the time of his death in 2007. Penny died in 2009.

Uren had two sons from his second marriage.

== Racing record ==
=== Complete British Saloon Car Championship results ===
(key) (Races in bold indicate pole position; races in italics indicate fastest lap.)

| Year | Team | Car | Class | 1 | 2 | 3 | 4 | 5 | 6 | 7 | 8 | 9 | 10 | 11 | DC | Pts | Class |
|---|---|---|---|---|---|---|---|---|---|---|---|---|---|---|---|---|---|
| 1958 | Jeff Uren | Ford Zephyr | C | BRH | BRH; 5‡ | MAL; 2† | BRH; 4† | BRH; DNS | CRY; 4 | BRH ? | BRH; 5 | BRH | | | 6th | 36 | **2nd** |
| 1959 | Jeff Uren | Ford Zephyr | C | GOO; 5 | AIN ? | SIL; 7 | GOO; 10 | SNE; 3 | BRH; 2† | BRH; 3† | | | | | **1st** | **46** | **1st** |
| 1960 | Jeff Uren | Ford Zephyr | 1601-2600cc | BRH | SNE | MAL | OUL | SNE | BRH ?* | BRH | BRH | | | | NC* | 0* | |
| 1961 | Jeff Uren | Ford Zephyr | C | SNE | GOO | AIN | SIL | CRY | SIL ? | BRH | OUL | SNE | | | 29th | 4 | 4th |
| 1962 | Ford Motor Company | Ford Zephyr | C | SNE | GOO | AIN | SIL ? | CRY | AIN | BRH | OUL | | | | 30th | 2 | 5th |
| 1963 | John Willment Automobilies | Ford Cortina GT | B | SNE | OUL; Ret | GOO | AIN | SIL | CRY; 10† | | | | | | 29th | 6 | 15th |
| 1963 | John Willment Automobilies | Ford Zodiac Mk 3 | C | | | | | | | SIL; 27 | BRH | BRH | OUL | SIL | 29th | 6 | **3rd** |

† Events with 2 races staged for the different classes.

‡ Event with 3 races staged for the different classes.

- Car over 1000cc - Not eligible for points.

Sporting positions
| Preceded by Jack Sears | British Touring Car Champion; 1959 | Succeeded by Doc Shepherd |
