= 1958 British Saloon Car Championship =

Inaugural season of the British Touring Car Championship

Seasons
- ← none 1959 →

The 1958 BRSCC British Saloon Car Championship was the inaugural season of the championship. The series was open to four separate classes, up to 1200cc, 1201-1600cc, 1601-2700cc and 2701cc and above. Equal championship points were to be scored in each class, meaning any driver could win the championship without winning any races outright. The first ever round was actually held on 26 December 1957 at Brands Hatch. The final round of the year was held on 5 October back at Brands Hatch.

Jack Sears and Tommy Sopwith ended the final race on the same number of championship points. With this a possibility going into the final round it was initially suggested the champion would be decided by the toss of a coin. The idea was very unpopular with both drivers, and it was decided two identical looking Marcus Chambers-owned Riley One-Point-Five works rally cars would be brought along for a five lap shoot-out. To make the race fair, they raced five laps, switched cars, then raced five laps again with the driver who had the quickest combined time being crowned champion. In extremely wet conditions, the first head to head was won by Sopwith by 2.2 seconds. The second race was won by Sears by 3.8 seconds. This meant that Sears was crowned the first ever BSCC champion.

== Calendar ==
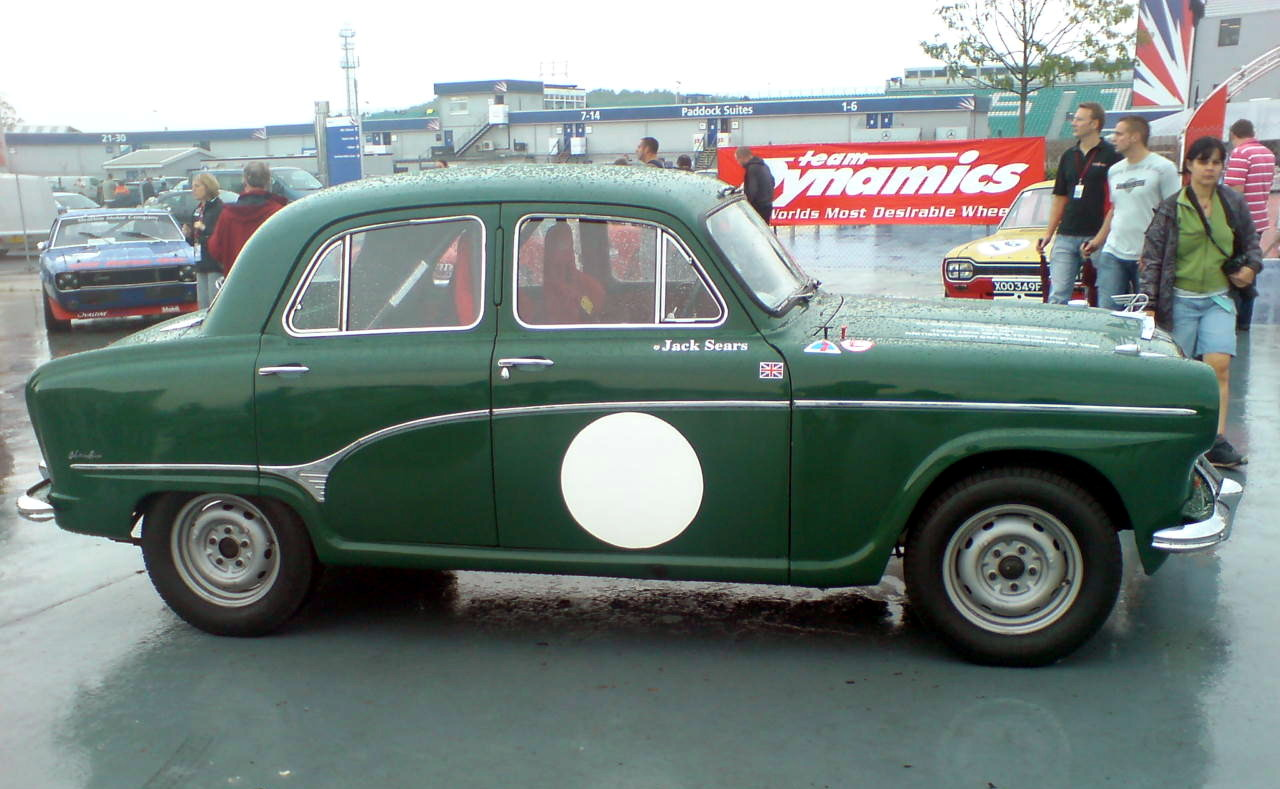
The Austin A105 with which Jack Sears won the 1958 British Saloon Car Championship

Overall winners of multi-class races in bold.

Round		Circuit	Date	Class A Winner	Class B Winner	Class C Winner	Class D Winner
1	A	Brands Hatch, Kent	7 April	(United Kingdom) John Sprinzel	Not contested.	(United Kingdom) **Jack Sears**	Not contested.
1	B	Brands Hatch, Kent	7 April	Not contested.	(United Kingdom) Alan Foster	Not contested.	(United Kingdom) **Tommy Sopwith**
NC		Aintree Motor Racing Circuit, Liverpool	19 April	Unknown.	(United Kingdom) Alan Foster	(United Kingdom) Peter Blond	(United Kingdom) **Gawaine Baillie**
2	A	Brands Hatch, Kent	20 April	(United Kingdom) John Sprinzel	Not contested.		
2	B	Brands Hatch, Kent	20 April	Not contested.	(United Kingdom) Tommy Bridger	Not contested.	
2	C	Brands Hatch, Kent	20 April	Not contested.		(United Kingdom) Jack Sears	(United Kingdom) **Tommy Sopwith**
NC		Silverstone Circuit, Northamptonshire	3 May	(United Kingdom) Graham Hill	(United Kingdom) Les Leston	(United Kingdom) Jeff Uren	(United Kingdom) **Mike Hawthorn**
3	A	Mallory Park, Leicestershire	11 May	(United Kingdom) John Sprinzel	Not contested.		
3	B	Mallory Park, Leicestershire	11 May	Not contested.	(United Kingdom) Les Leston	(United Kingdom) Jeff Uren	(United Kingdom) **Gawaine Baillie**
4	A	Brands Hatch, Kent	18 May	(United Kingdom) John Sprinzel	Not contested.		
4	B	Brands Hatch, Kent	18 May	Not contested.	(United Kingdom) Tommy Bridger	(United Kingdom) Jack Sears	(United Kingdom) **Tommy Sopwith**
NC		Goodwood Circuit, West Sussex	26 May	(United Kingdom) John Sprinzel	(United Kingdom) Barney Everley	(United Kingdom) **Duncan Hamilton**^{1}	
5	A	Brands Hatch, Kent	8 June	(United Kingdom) John Sprinzel	Not contested.		
5	B	Brands Hatch, Kent	8 June	Not contested.	(United Kingdom) Tommy Bridger	(United Kingdom) Jack Sears	(United Kingdom) **Tommy Sopwith**
NC		Snetterton Motor Racing Circuit, Norfolk	29 June	(United Kingdom) John Sprinzel	(United Kingdom) Les Leston	(United Kingdom) Edgar Wadsworth	(United Kingdom) **Tommy Sopwith**
6		Crystal Palace, London	5 July	(United Kingdom) George 'Doc' Shepherd	(United Kingdom) Alan Foster	(United Kingdom) Jeff Uren	(United Kingdom) **Tommy Sopwith**
NC		Silverstone Circuit, Northamptonshire	19 July	(United Kingdom) Bob Gerard	(United Kingdom) Les Leston	(United Kingdom) Jack Sears	(United States) **Walt Hansgen**
7		Brands Hatch, Kent	4 August	(United Kingdom) John Sprinzel	(United Kingdom) Alan Foster	(United Kingdom) Jack Sears	(United Kingdom) **Tommy Sopwith**
8		Brands Hatch, Kent	30 August	(United Kingdom) George 'Doc' Shepherd	(United Kingdom) Les Leston	(United Kingdom) Jack Sears	(United Kingdom) **Tommy Sopwith**
9		Brands Hatch, Kent	5 October	(United Kingdom) George 'Doc' Shepherd	(United Kingdom) Les Leston	(United Kingdom) Jack Sears	(United Kingdom) **Tommy Sopwith**
NC		Brands Hatch, Kent	26 December	(United Kingdom) George 'Doc' Shepherd	(United Kingdom) Les Leston	(United Kingdom) Jeff Uren	(United Kingdom) **Gawaine Baillie**

^{1}Classes combined.

== Championship results ==
Driver's championship
Pos.	Driver	Car	Team	Class	Points
1	(United Kingdom) Jack Sears	Austin A105	Jack Sears	C	48
2	(United Kingdom) Tommy Sopwith	Jaguar 3.4 Litre	Equipe Endeavour	D	48
3	(United Kingdom) John Sprinzel	Austin A35	Team Speedwell	A	47
4	(United Kingdom) Doc Shepherd	Austin A35	Team Speedwell	A	41
5	(United Kingdom) Alan Foster	MG Magnette	Dick Jacobs	B	40
6	(United Kingdom) Jeff Uren	Jaguar 3.4 Litre; Ford Zephyr	Jeff Uren	C	36
