= Tom Bridger =

British racing driver (1934–1991)

Tommy Bridger
- Born: 24 June 1934; Woolmer Green, Hertfordshire, England, UK
- Died: 30 July 1991 (aged 57); Logie Coldstone, Aberdeenshire, Scotland, UK

Formula One World Championship career
- Nationality: (United Kingdom) British
- Active years: 1958
- Team: British Racing Partnership
- Entries: 1
- Championships: 0
- Wins: 0
- Podiums: 0
- Career points: 0
- Pole positions: 0
- Fastest laps: 0
- First entry: 1958 Moroccan Grand Prix

Thomas Bridger (24 June 1934 – 30 July 1991) was a British racing driver from England. He participated in one Formula One World Championship Grand Prix, on 19 October 1958, scoring no championship points. His greatest success came in Formula Three, where he won 15 races.

== Career ==
Born in Woolmer Green, Hertfordshire, Bridger started racing in Formula Three in 1953, initially competing minor events in a Kieft-Norton before moving to a Cooper to compete full-time in Formula Three in 1957. He achieved some success racing with Jim Russell, one of the more successful drivers in the category. He moved up to Formula Two in 1958, finishing second in the Crystal Palace Trophy race, and eighth in the Coupe de Vitesse at Reims.

Bridger raced in the 1958 Moroccan Grand Prix with British Racing Partnership, driving a Formula Two-class Cooper T45. He qualified in 22nd place, and Bridger got up to 14th before his race was ended by a collision on lap 30. The crash involved three vehicles, but Bridger emerged unharmed.

Bridger returned to Formula Three in 1959 with the Cooper-Norton car, winning four races throughout the year. In 1960, he raced in Formula Junior, competing in a works Lotus at the British Grand Prix.

Bridger died at Logie Coldstone, Aberdeenshire in 1991 at the age of 57 years.

== Racing record ==
=== Complete Formula One World Championship results ===
(key)

Year	Entrant	Chassis	Engine	1	2	3	4	5	6	7	8	9	10	11	WDC	Points
1958	British Racing Partnership	Cooper T45 (F2)	Climax Straight-4	ARG	MON	NED	500	BEL	FRA	GBR	GER	POR	ITA	MOR; Ret	NC	0

=== Complete British Saloon Car Championship results ===
(key) (Races in bold indicate pole position; races in italics indicate fastest lap.)

Year	Team	Car	Class	1	2	3	4	5	6	7	8	9	DC	Pts	Class
1958	Metcalfe & Munday	Borgward Isabella TS	B	BRH	BRH; 1‡	MAL; 6†	BRH ?†	BRH; 4†	CRY	BRH	BRH	BRH	NC	0	NC
1959	Tom Bridger	Borgward Isabella TS	B	GOO	AIN	SIL	CRY	SNE; Ret	BRH	BRH			NC	0	NC

† Events with 2 races staged for the different classes.

‡ Event with 3 races staged for the different classes.
