= 1959 British Saloon Car Championship =

2nd season of the British Touring Car Championship

Seasons
- ← 1958 1960 →

The 1959 BRSCC British Saloon Car Championship was the second season of the championship. It began at Goodwood on 30 March and finished at Brands Hatch on 29 August. Jeff Uren became the second BSCC champion, thanks to his domination of Class C in his Ford Zephyr.

== Calendar & Winners ==
All races were held in the United Kingdom. Overall winners of multi-class races in bold.

Round		Circuit	Date	Class A Winner	Class B Winner	Class C Winner	Class D Winner
1		Goodwood Circuit, West Sussex	30 March	(United Kingdom) George 'Doc' Shepherd	(United Kingdom) Les Leston	(United Kingdom) Jeff Uren	(United Kingdom) **Ivor Bueb**
2		Aintree Motor Racing Circuit, Liverpool	18 April	(United Kingdom) George 'Doc' Shepherd	(United Kingdom) Les Leston	(United Kingdom) Jeff Uren	(United Kingdom) **Ivor Bueb**
3		Silverstone Circuit, Northamptonshire	2 May	(United Kingdom) George 'Doc' Shepherd	(Sweden) Gunnar Andersson	(United Kingdom) Peter Blond	(United Kingdom) **Ivor Bueb**
4	A	Crystal Palace Circuit, London	18 May	(United Kingdom) **Geoff Williamson**	(United Kingdom) Les Leston	Not contested.	
4	B	Goodwood Circuit, West Sussex	18 May	Not contested.		(United Kingdom) Jeff Uren	(United Kingdom) **Gawaine Baillie**
5		Snetterton Motor Racing Circuit, Norfolk	14 June	(United Kingdom) George 'Doc' Shepherd	(United Kingdom) Peter Pilsworth	(United Kingdom) Jeff Uren	(United Kingdom) **Gawaine Baillie**
6	A	Brands Hatch, Kent	3 August	(United Kingdom) Geoff Williamson	Not contested.		
6	B	Brands Hatch, Kent	3 August	Not contested.	(United Kingdom) Les Leston	(United Kingdom) Jeff Uren	(United Kingdom) **Gawaine Baillie**
7	A	Brands Hatch, Kent	29 August	(United Kingdom) Geoff Williamson	Not contested.		
7	B	Brands Hatch, Kent	29 August	Not contested.	(United Kingdom) Bill Blydenstein	(United Kingdom) Jeff Uren	(United Kingdom) **Jack Sears**

== Championship results ==
Driver's championship
Pos.	Driver	Car	Team	Class	Points
1	(United Kingdom) Jeff Uren	Ford Zephyr	Jeff Uren	C	46
2	(United Kingdom) Doc Shepherd	Austin A40		A	42
3	(United Kingdom) Les Leston	Riley 1.5		B	38
4	(United Kingdom) Len Adams	Austin A35	Team Speedwell	A	34
5	(United Kingdom) Bill Blydenstein	Borgward Isabella		B	33
6	(United Kingdom) Geoff Williamson	Austin A40	Alexander Engineering Co	A	26
