= John Sprinzel =

British racing driver (1930–2021)

John Sprinzel (October 25, 1930 – May 2021) was an English motor racing driver renowned for competing in saloon and sports car races in addition to his main career in rallying. He was born in Berlin, where his father was a film director for Paramount Newsreel and his mother a dress designer. Three years later the family moved to England, as John's father had been tasked with setting up Paramount Newsreel's London branch. (The move had nothing to do with the Nazi persecution of Jews, as has been shrilly claimed in obituaries published in once-respected national newspapers. The family were members of the Lutheran Church.)

Sprinzel finished third overall in the inaugural 1958 British Saloon Car Championship season driving for his own Team Speedwell in an Austin A35. Navigated by future BMC and Ford Competitions Manager Stuart Turner, he won the British Rally Championship in 1959, driving an Austin-Healey Sprite and an Alfa Romeo Giulietta TI. In International events during 1960, he won his class in the 12 Hours of Sebring race in Florida and scored second place overall in the RAC Rally of Great Britain and third overall in Belgium's gruelling Liège-Rome-Liège. These successes were all achieved in Austin-Healey Sebring Sprites, a car he was instrumental in developing.

Sprinzel published three volumes of memoirs: 'Sleepless Knights' (1962), 'Spritely Years' (1994 and 2008) and 'Lucky John' (2013), as well as a tuning manual for BMC cars 'Modified Motoring' (1959 and 1961). John died of natural causes in Hawaii where he had lived for many years with his life-partner Caryl.

== See also ==
- Austin-Healey Sebring Sprite
