= Jack Sears =

British driver (1930–2016)

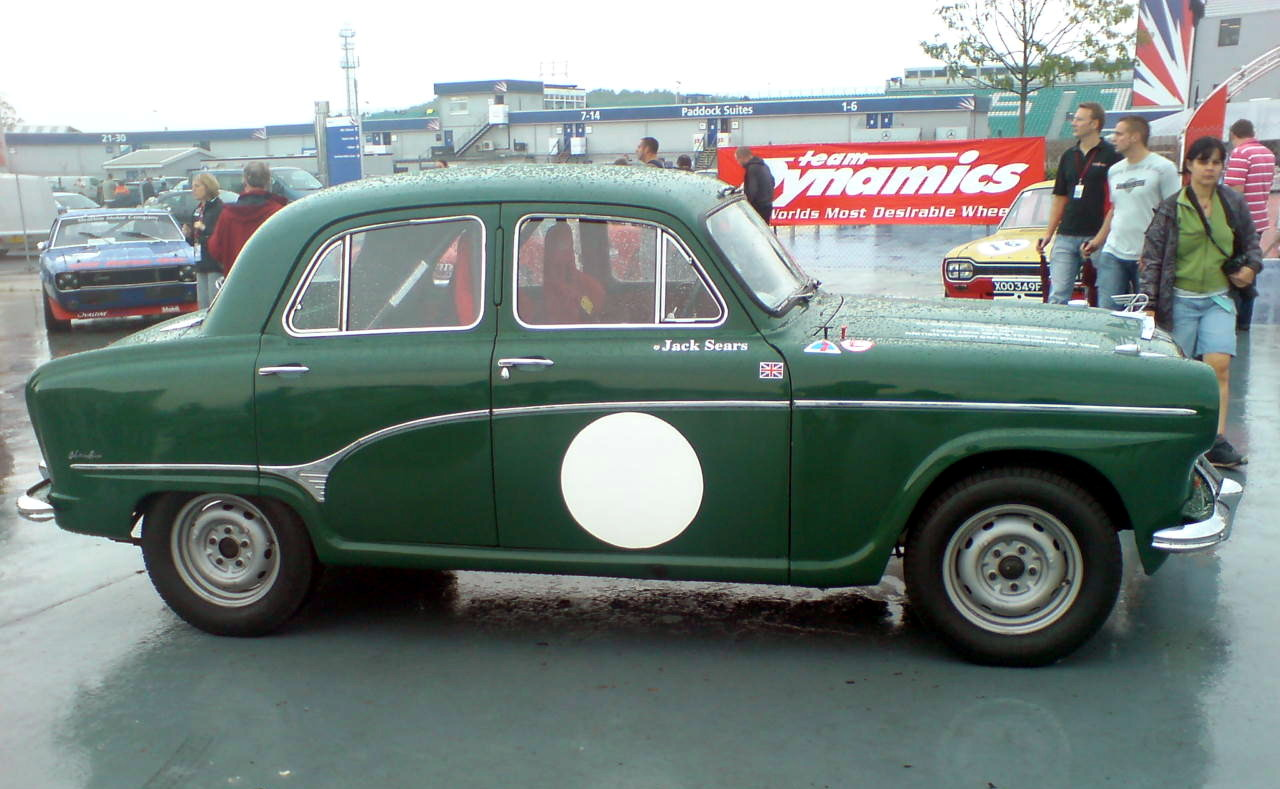
- Sears' 1958 Championship-winning Austin Westminster
- Nationality: (United Kingdom) British
- Born: 16 February 1930 Northampton, England
- Died: 6 August 2016 (aged 86)
- Retired: 1965
- Relatives: David Sears

British Saloon Car Championship
- Years active: 1958–1965
- Wins: 12
- Best finish: 1st in 1958 and 1963

Championship titles
- 1958, 1963 1958, 1965 1962 1963: British Saloon Car Championship; BSCC - Class C BSCC - Class D BSCC - Class B

Jack Sears (16 February 1930 – 6 August 2016) was a British race and rally driver, and was one of the principal organisers of the 1968 London-Sydney Marathon. The British Touring Car Championship has a trophy named after him, being the Jack Sears Trophy.

== Biography ==
Sears was popularly known as "Gentleman Jack". His son David is also involved in motorsport.

Sears won the inaugural British Saloon Car Championship in 1958, driving an Austin Westminster. After finishing on joint maximum points with Tommy Sopwith, it was initially suggested the champion would be decided by the toss of a coin. The idea was very unpopular with both drivers and at the final meeting at Brands Hatch, with a draw being a likely possibility, two identical looking Marcus Chambers-owned Riley One-Point-Five works rally cars were brought along for a five lap shoot-out. To make the race fair, they raced five laps, switched cars, then raced five laps again with the driver who had the quickest combined time being crowned champion. In pouring rain, Sears became the first ever champion by 1.6 seconds.

Sears regained the title in 1963, driving a variety of cars including a Ford Cortina GT, a seven-litre Ford Galaxie and a Lotus Cortina, which was used for the final two races. Sears also co-drove a Ferrari 330 LMB with Mike Salmon to a fifth place in the 1963 Le Mans 24 Hours, the best result in the abbreviated racing history of the LMB.

=== AC Cobra ===
In 1964, AC Cars decided to enter a works Cobra in that years Le Mans 24 race and hired Sears as one of their drivers. To test its stability and gearing at the speeds the car (which had the chassis number A98) was expected to reach along the three mile long Mulsanne straight they decided to test it along the only available place that was long enough to reach its potential top speed. This was the northern end of the first section of the six lane M1 motorway which had no barriered central reservation and no speed limit. The use of the motorway for high speed testing was not unusual as Aston Martin, Jaguar and the Rootes Group had also been using it.

After Sears had some food at the Blue Boar service station and waiting beside it for no traffic to pass for several minutes, he set off at about 4:15 am on 11 June 1964. In top gear the car reached 6,500 rpm on its rev-counter (it had no speedometer), moved no more and was rock-solid. Sears then slowed down and returned to the engineers. From the engine revolutions and after compensating for tyre growth it was calculated that the car had reached 185mph.

With days after a conversation in a Fleet Street bar reports of the high speed run was headlines in the national newspapers. This led to the Ministry of Transport investigating, but no action was taken as no laws had been broken.

Nine days after the test on the M1, the car with Sears and Peter Bolton sharing the driving participated in the 1964 Le Mans race. While being driven in the evening by Bolton the car had a rear tyre blowout. The car spun and was then collected by the Ferrari of Giancarlo Baghetti. Tragically, the Cobra speared off into the barriers and killed three young French spectators who had been standing in a prohibited area. Baghetti was uninjured, and Bolton was taken to hospital with minor injuries.

== Death ==
Sears died on 6 August 2016 from lung cancer. He had previously survived a heart attack.

== Racing record ==
=== Complete British Saloon Car Championship results ===
(key) (Races in bold indicate pole position; races in italics indicate fastest lap.)

Year	Team	Car	Class	1	2	3	4	5	6	7	8	9	10	11	DC	Pts	Class
1958	Jack Sears	Austin A105	C	**BRH**; 1†	BRH; 4‡	MAL; 3†	BRH; 3†	BRH; 3†	CRY	BRH; 3	BRH; 2	BRH; 2			**1st**	**48**	**1st**
1959	Equipe Endeavour	Jaguar 3.4-Litre	D	GOO	AIN	SIL	GOO	SNE; 2	BRH	BRH; 1†					NC	0	NC
1960	Equipe Endeavour	Jaguar Mk II 3.8		BRH	SNE	MAL	OUL	SNE; 1*	**BRH**; 2*	BRH; 1*	BRH				NC*	0*	
1961	Equipe Endeavour	Jaguar Mk II 3.8	D	SNE; Ret	GOO	AIN; 2	SIL	CRY; Ret	SIL	BRH; 3	OUL	SNE ?			16th	12	6th
1962	Equipe Endeavour	Jaguar Mk II 3.8	D	SNE; 2	GOO; 3	AIN; 4	SIL; 3	CRY; 2	AIN; 1	BRH; 2	OUL; 2				**3rd**	**38**	**1st**
1963	John Willment Automobiles	Ford Cortina GT	B	SNE	OUL; 4	GOO; 7	AIN; 4					BRH; 3			**1st**	**71**	**1st**
1963	John Willment Automobiles	Ford Cortina Lotus	B										OUL; 3	SNE; 4	**1st**	**71**	**1st**
1963	John Willment Automobiles	Ford Galaxie	D					**SIL**; 1	**CRY**; 1†	**SIL**; 1	**BRH**; Ret				**1st**	**71**	**3rd**
1964	John Willment Automobiles	Ford Galaxie	D	SNE; Ret	GOO; 1	OUL; Ret	**AIN**; 3	**SIL**; 1	**CRY**; Ret†	BRH; 1	**OUL**; Ret				8th	22	**3rd**
1965	Team Lotus	Ford Cortina Lotus	C	BRH; Ret	OUL; Ret	SNE; 6	GOO; 2	SIL; 1	CRY; 3†	BRH; 3	OUL; 2				4th	38	**1st**

† Events with 2 races staged for the different classes.

‡ Event with 3 races staged for the different classes.

- Car over 1000cc - Not eligible for points.

=== 24 Hours of Le Mans results ===
Year	Team	Co-Drivers	Car	Class	Laps	Pos.	Class Pos.
1960	(United Kingdom) J.G. Sears	(United Kingdom) Peter Riley	Austin-Healey 3000	GT3.0	89	DNF	DNF
1963	(United Kingdom) Maranello Concessionaires Ltd.	(United Kingdom) Mike Salmon	Ferrari 330 LMB	P +3.0	314	5th	**1st**
1964	(United Kingdom) AC Cars Ltd.	(United Kingdom) Peter Bolton	AC Cobra Coupé	GT5.0	77	DNF	DNF
1965	(United Kingdom) AC Cars Ltd.	(United States) Dick Thompson	AC Cobra Daytona Coupé	GT5.0	304	8th	**1st**

Sporting positions
Preceded by none	British Saloon Car Champion; 1958	Succeeded by Jeff Uren
Preceded by John Love	British Saloon Car Champion; 1963	Succeeded by Jim Clark
