= Doc Shepherd =

British racing driver (1900–1986)

- Nationality: (United Kingdom) British
- Born: George Corbyn Shepherd; 13 May 1900 Bromley, England
- Died: October 1986 (aged 86) Cambridge, England
- Retired: 1963

British Saloon Car Championship
- Years active: 1958–1961, 1963
- Teams: Team Speedwell; Don Moore Racing
- Starts: 30
- Wins: 2 (13 in class)
- Poles: 0
- Fastest laps: 17
- Best finish: 1st in 1960

Championship titles
- 1959 1960: BSCC - Class A British Saloon Car Championship

George Corbyn "Doc" Shepherd (13 May 1900 – October 1986) was a British racing driver. He entered the inaugural year of the British Saloon Car Championship in 1958, driving a class A Austin A35 where he finished fourth on points and second in class. in 1959, he finished second in the championship in an Austin A40. He became the BSCC champion a year later in 1960 for the Don Moore Racing Team.

== Racing record ==
=== Complete British Saloon Car Championship results ===
(key) (Races in bold indicate pole position; races in italics indicate fastest lap.)

Year	Team	Car	Class	1	2	3	4	5	6	7	8	9	10	11	DC	Pts	Class
1958	Team Speedwell	Austin A35	A	BRH ovr:5† cls:2†	BRH ovr:2‡ cls:2‡	MAL ovr:2† cls:2†	BRH ovr:2† cls:2†	BRH; Ret†	CRY ovr:6 cls:1	BRH ovr:? cls:2	BRH ovr:6 cls:1	BRH ovr:6 cls:1			4th	41	**2nd**
1959	Doc Shepherd	Austin A40	A	GOO ovr:? cls:1	AIN ovr:? cls:1	SIL ovr:12 cls:1	CRY ovr:2 cls:2	SNE ovr:5 cls:1	BRH; Ret†	BRH; Ret†					**2nd**	**42**	**1st**
1960	Don Moore Racing	Austin A40		BRH; 1	SNE ovr:3 cls:1	MAL; 1	OUL; Ret	SNE ovr:3 cls:1	BRH ovr:5 cls:1	BRH ovr:2 cls:1	BRH; Ret				**1st**	**48**	
1961	Doc Shepherd	Austin Mini Seven	A	SNE ovr:? cls:1	GOO ?	AIN; Ret	SIL; Ret	CRY ovr:7 cls:1							11th	18	4th
1961	Doc Shepherd	BMW 700 CS	A						SIL; DNS	BRH	OUL	SNE			11th	18	4th
1963	Doc Shepherd	Morris Mini Cooper	A	SNE	OUL	GOO	AIN ovr:? cls:?	SIL	CRY	SIL	BRH	BRH	OUL	SIL	NC	0	NC

† Events with 2 races staged for the different classes.

‡ Event with 3 races staged for the different classes.

Sporting positions
Preceded by Jeff Uren	British Touring Car Champion; 1960	Succeeded by John Whitmore
