= Austin A40 Farina =

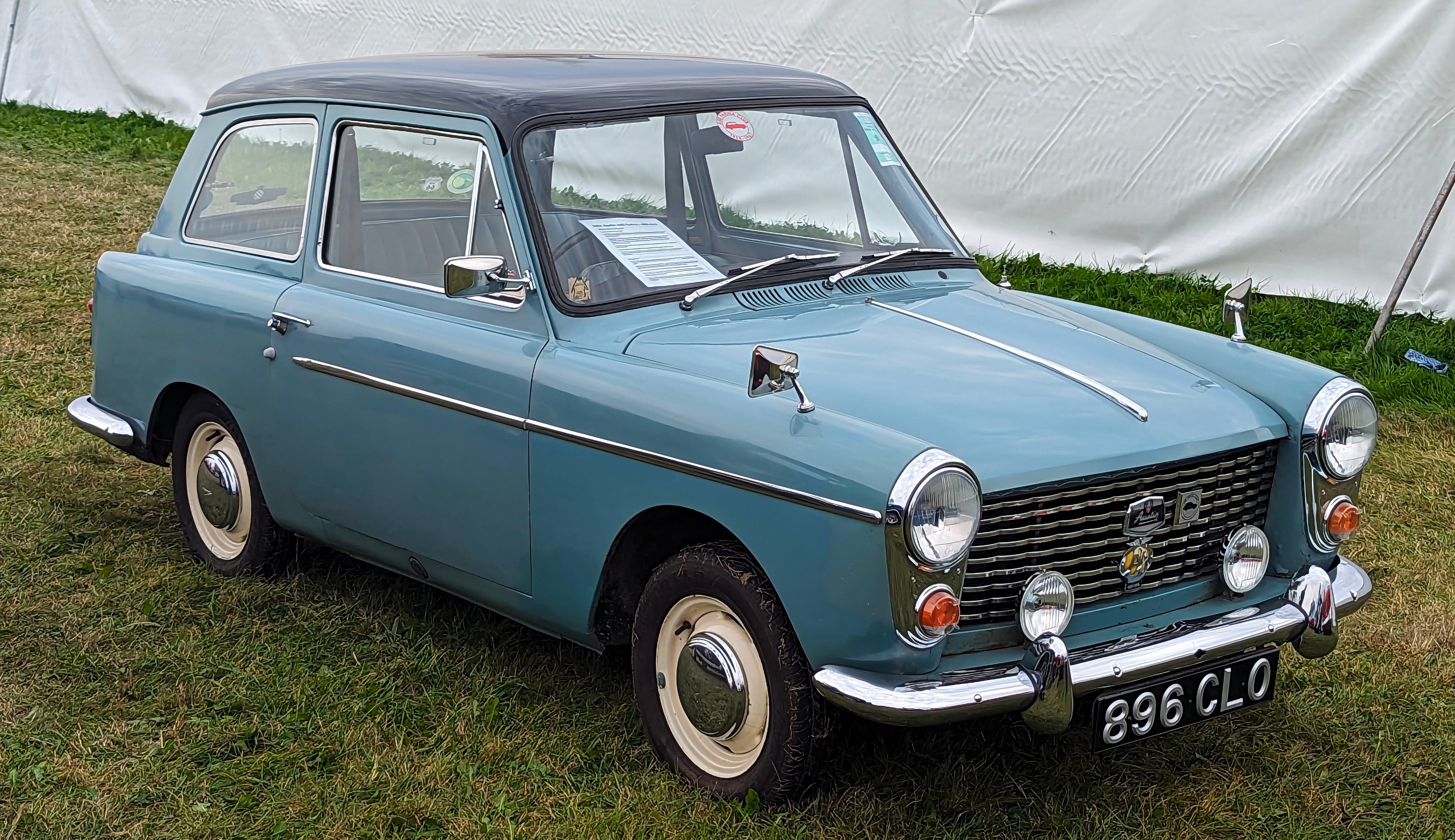

Overview
- Manufacturer: Austin (BMC)
- Also called: Austin A40 Futura (Sweden); Innocenti Austin A40
- Production: 1958–1967; 342,162 produced
- Assembly: United Kingdom: Longbridge (Longbridge plant); Australia: Sydney (BMC Australia); Italy: Lambrate, Milan (Innocenti); Mexico; Netherlands: Amersfoort; New Zealand: Petone (Associated Motor Industries); South Africa: Cape Town (BMC South Africa)
- Designer: Pinin Farina

Body and chassis
- Class: Compact car / Economy car (C)
- Body style: 2-door saloon 3-door hatchback 3-door van
- Layout: FR layout

Chronology
- Predecessor: Austin A35
- Successor: Austin 1100

The Austin A40 Farina is a small, economy car introduced by Austin in saloon (1958) and A40 Countryman (1959) estate versions. It has a two-box body configuration. It was badged, like many before it, as an A40, consistent with Austin's naming scheme at the time, based on the approximate engine output in horsepower; and to distinguish it from other A40 models, it was also given a suffix name – this one being the Farina, reflecting the all-new design by Italian Battista Farina's Pinin Farina Turin studio. The model was however marketed without the Farina name.

Austin had been merged into the British Motor Corporation (BMC) in 1952 and – unusually for BMC at the time – the A40 Farina was sold only as an Austin and not rebadged for sale under any other BMC brands. The Farina was the first Austin A40 not named after a county of England, and the last in the Austin A40 line.

The 1959, A40 Countryman version stands out by its layout as a small estate car with an upward (and downward) opening tailgate, and is therefore viewed as one of the earliest examples of a volume production hatchback.

== Background and innovation ==
Like an A30 Countryman and A35 Countryman, the A40 Countryman version combined many traits of a compact saloon and estate car. Additionally, the A40 Countryman had a split lifting and lowering tailgate. Sideways opening rear doors had been fitted to Austin estate cars since the 1948 A40 Devon Countryman. The new feature made the A40 Farina Countryman an early example of what later became known as a hatchback.

The Pinin Farina body design also offered more shoulder and headroom for the rear passengers, through the angular instead of curved lines of the roof and upper-rear body, while as a two-seater (with the rear seat folded), it provided an exceptionally large luggage space. The original saloon version's luggage boot had a tail board that swung down, while the rear window remained fixed, and the space behind the rear seat was usually covered by a vinyl tonneau cover. This could be removed, and the rear seats folded to permit all of the back of the car to be used for luggage, though the loading floor achieved was far from flat.

Farina's design came at a time when the Turin automotive-design studios were, for the most part, consulted only by builders of expensive "exotic" cars, and BMC made much of the car's Italian styling, with both Battista and his son Sergio attending its UK launch. The car appeared as a scaled-down version of the Austin Cambridge and Morris Oxford, but without an extended boot. These cars were also designed by Pinin Farina.

== Naming ==
The A40 designation had been used on a series of previous Austins, most recently the Cambridge, but the "Farina" suffix was new with this car, marketing the Pinin Farina design – contrary to all previous A40s, which had been named after counties of England. The Countryman name, on the other hand, had been used on several previous Austin (A40) estate models. Early examples including the somewhat larger 1948 Countryman estate of the 1947 A40 Devon / Dorset, and the more upscale 1948 A70 Countryman – but also on the estate versions of the A40 Farina's direct A30 and A35 predecessors.

The Farina name was not used in Sweden, where the car received the name "Futura" because a mix-up with a common type of brown sugar with a similar name was believed to be unavoidable.

== Mark I ==
Austin A40 Farina Mark I
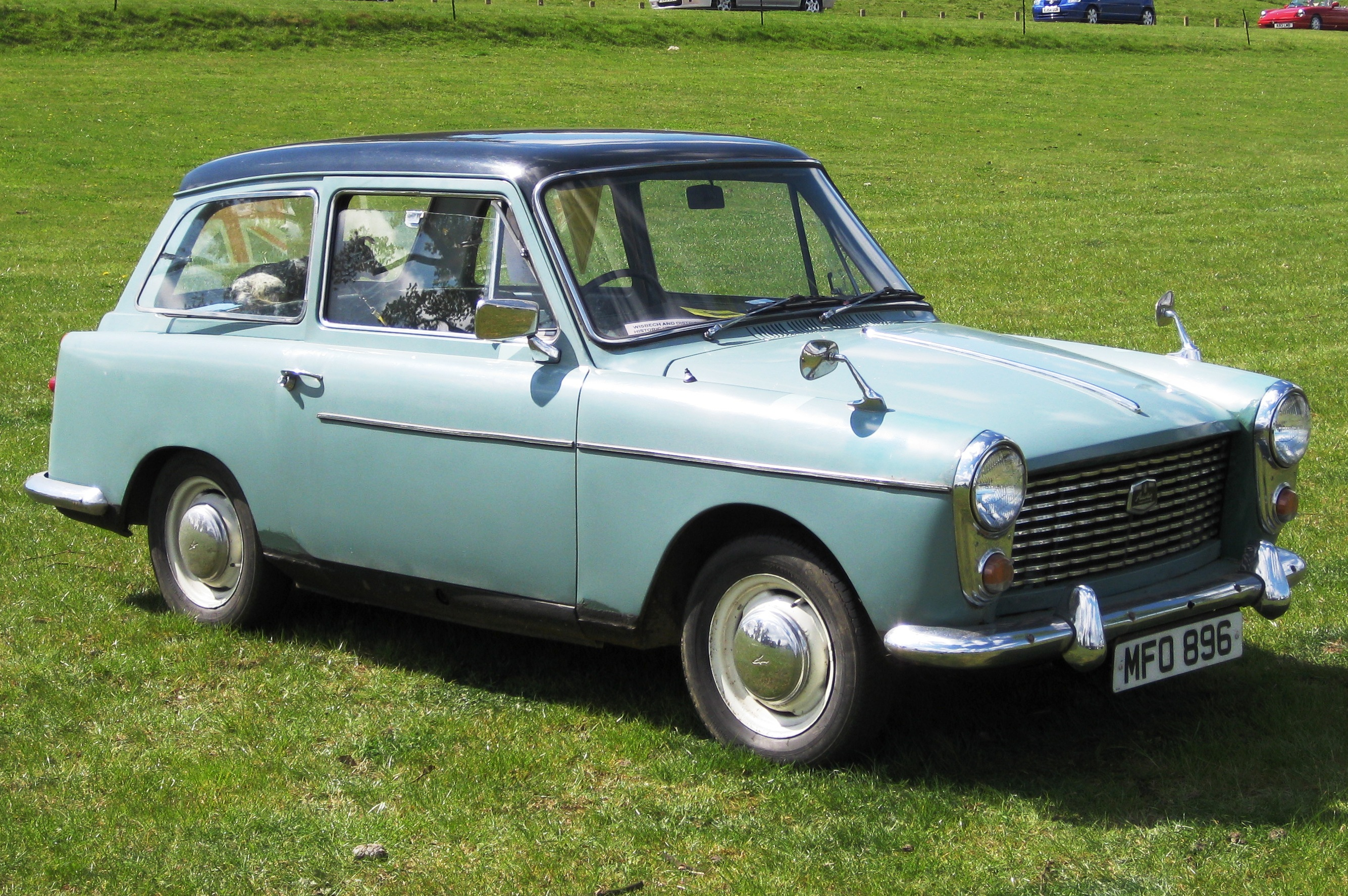
- Austin A40 Farina (Mark I)

Overview
- Production: 1958–1961; 169,612 produced
- Designer: Pinin Farina

Powertrain
- Engine: 948 cc A-Series I4

Dimensions
- Wheelbase: 83.5 in (2,121 mm)
- Length: 144.25 in (3,664 mm)
- Width: 59.5 in (1,511 mm)
- Height: 56.5 in (1,440 mm)
- Kerb weight: 1,764 lb (800 kg) approx

Presented as a saloon at the London Motor Show in October 1958, the A40 Farina was intended to replace the Austin A35, from which it inherited much of its running gear. This car was designed to be spacious with a new "two box" shape and headroom in the back seat. To access the trunk the bottom panel dropped with the rear window remaining fixed.

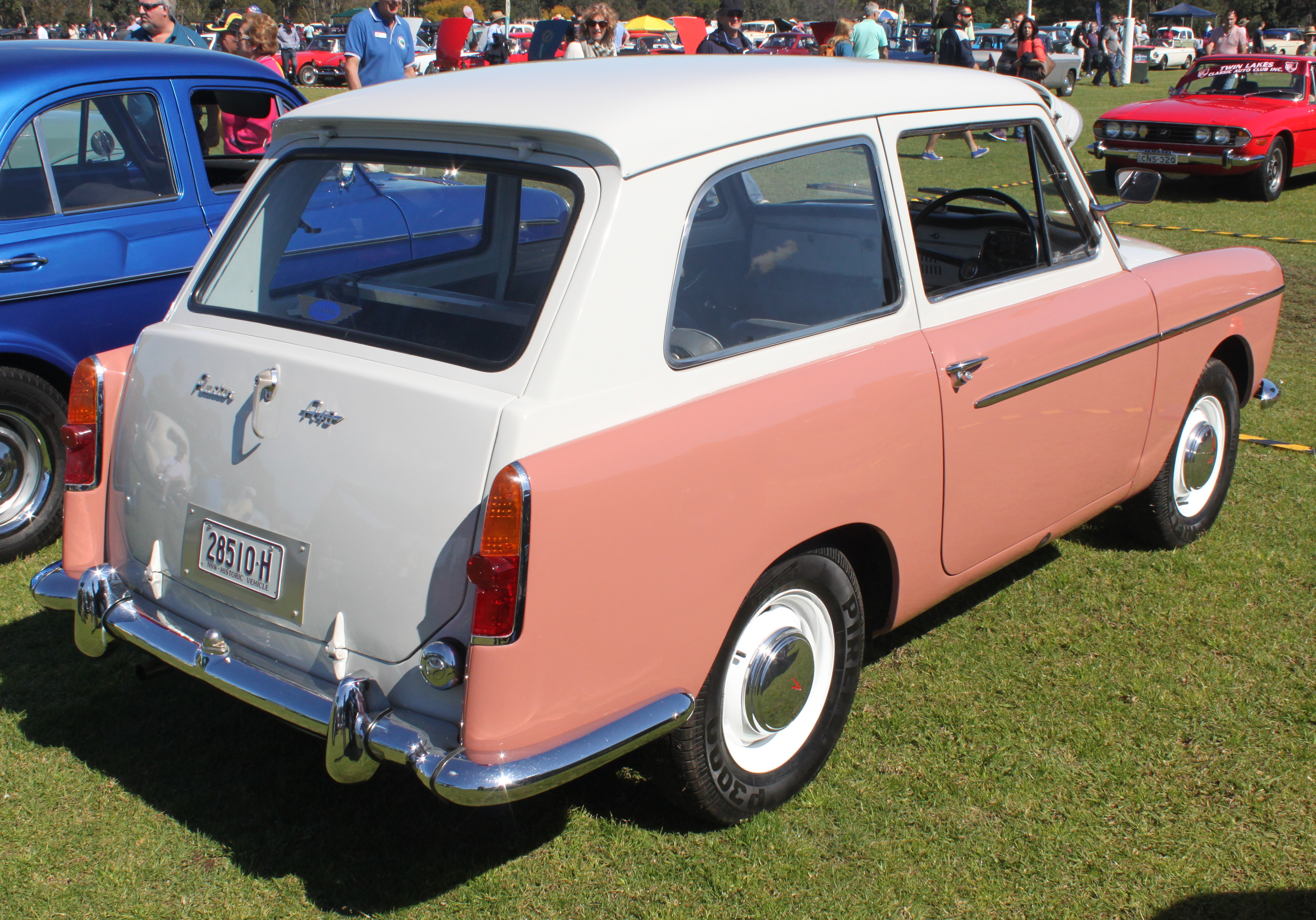
1960 Austin A40 Farina

The Countryman hatchback appeared exactly a year later in October 1959, and differed from the saloon in that the rear window was marginally smaller, to allow for a frame that could be lifted up, with its own support, while the lower panel was now flush with the floor and its hinges had been strengthened. It was a very small estate car with a horizontally split tailgate having a top-hinged upper door and bottom-hinged lower door. October 1959 also saw the standardisation on both cars of self-cancelling indicators and the provision of a centre interior light and, in early summer 1960, a flat lid was added over the spare wheel in the rear luggage compartment.

At launch the car shared the 948 cc A-Series straight-4 used in other Austins including its A35 predecessor. The suspension was independent at the front using coil springs with a live axle and semi elliptic leaf springs at the rear. The drum brakes were a hybrid (hydromech) arrangement, hydraulically operated at the front but cable actuated at the rear. The front drums at 8 in (200 mm) were slightly larger than the 7 in (180 mm) rears. Cam and peg steering was fitted.

Individual seats were fitted in the front, with a bench at the rear that could fold down to increase luggage capacity. The trim material was a vinyl treated fabric. Options included a heater, radio, windscreen washers and white-wall tyres. The gearchange lever was floor-mounted with the handbrake between the seats. The door windows were not opened by conventional winders, but pulled up and down using finger grips; a window lock position was on the door handle.

A de-luxe version tested by British magazine The Motor in 1958 had a top speed of 66.8 mph (107.5 km/h) and could accelerate from 0–50 mph (80 km/h) in 19.5 seconds. A fuel consumption of 38 miles per imperial gallon (7.4 L/100 km; 32 mpg_{‑US}) was recorded. The test car cost £689 including taxes of £230.

== Mark II ==
Austin A40 Farina Mark II
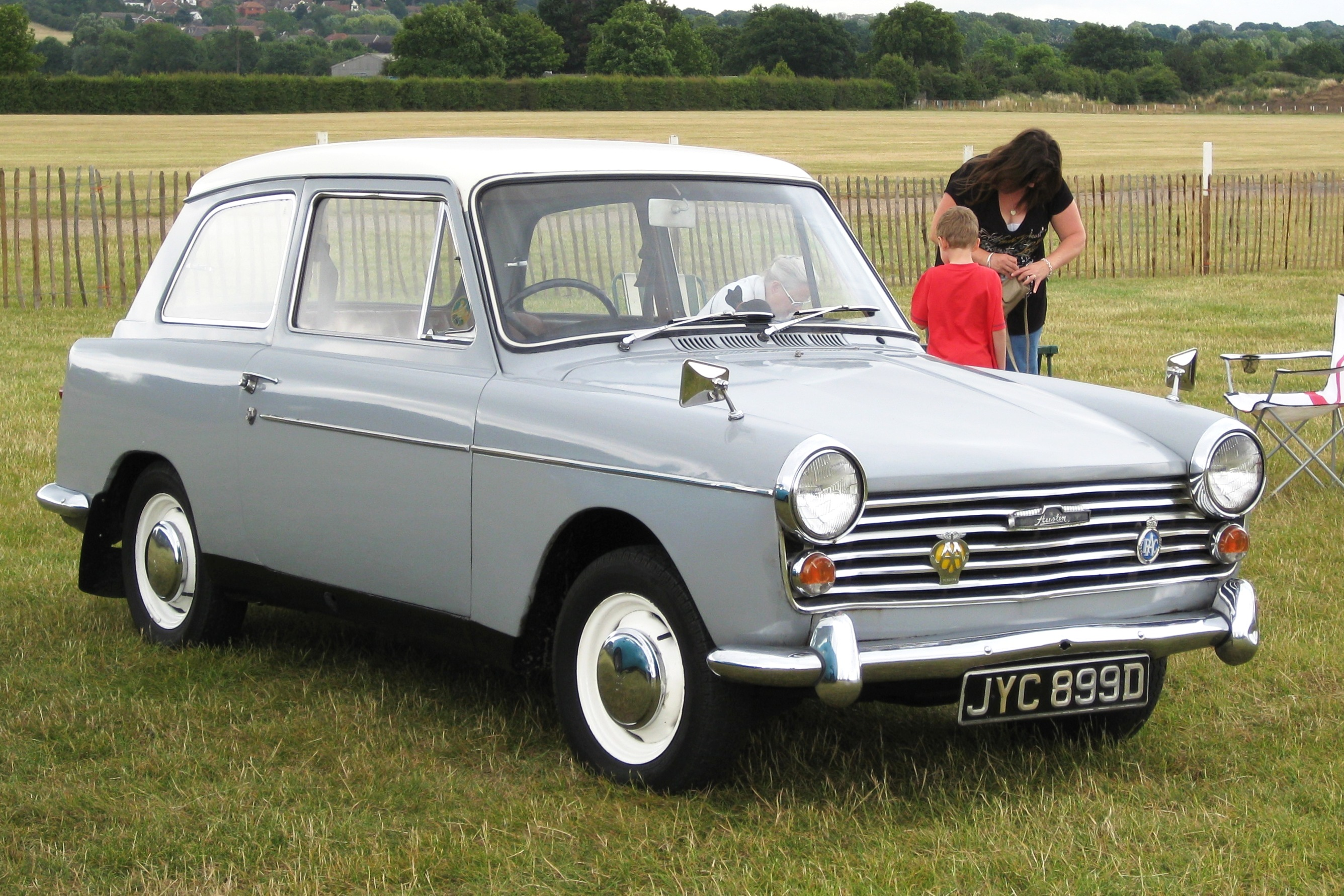
- Austin A40 Farina Mark II

Overview
- Production: 1961–1967; 172,550 produced
- Designer: Pininfarina

Powertrain
- Engine: 948 cc A-Series I4 (1961–62); 1098 cc A-Series I4 (1962–67)
- Transmission: 4-speed manual: synchromesh on top 3 ratios

Dimensions
- Wheelbase: 87 in (2,210 mm)47 in (1,194 mm)
- Length: 145 in (3,683 mm)
- Width: 59.5 in (1,511 mm)
- Height: 56.5 in (1,435 mm)
- Kerb weight: 1,764 lb (800 kg) approx

An A40 Farina Mark II was introduced in 1961. It had a 3.5 in (89 mm) longer wheelbase to increase the space for passengers in the back seats, and the front grille and dashboard were redesigned. The Mark II had more power (37 hp/28 kW) and an SU replaced the previous Zenith carburettor but was otherwise similar mechanically. An anti-roll bar was fitted at the front. The 948 cc engine was replaced in the autumn of 1962 by a larger 1098 cc version with an output of 48 bhp. The A40 shared this engine with the Morris Minor, which was also rear-wheel drive – both models retaining the traditional north–south engine layout – and also with the recently introduced front-wheel drive, transverse-engined Morris 1100. An improved gearbox was fitted to the A40 at the same time.

Further changes were minimal. However, in 1964 a new fascia with imitation wood veneer covering was fitted. This version of the model remained in production until 1967. The brakes also became fully hydraulic, replacing the semi cable-operated rear system that the Mark I had inherited from the A35. Nevertheless, the introduction at the end of 1962 of the similarly sized Morris 1100, followed by an Austin-badged counterpart a year later, left the A40 looking cramped on the inside and outclassed in terms of road holding and ride; sales of the A40 Mark II progressed at a slower rate than had been achieved by the Mark I.

A Mark II was tested by The Motor in 1962. The updated version had a higher top speed of 75.2 mph (121.0 km/h) and faster acceleration from 0–50 mph (80 km/h) of 17.4 seconds. The fuel consumption at 36.5 miles per imperial gallon (7.7 L/100 km; 30.4 mpg_{‑US}) was slightly higher. The car cost £693 including taxes of £218.

In the popular television series Heartbeat, the character Dr Tricia Summerbee (played by Clare Calbraith) drove a blue 1963 mark II saloon in series 10–12, with the registration BNK228A.

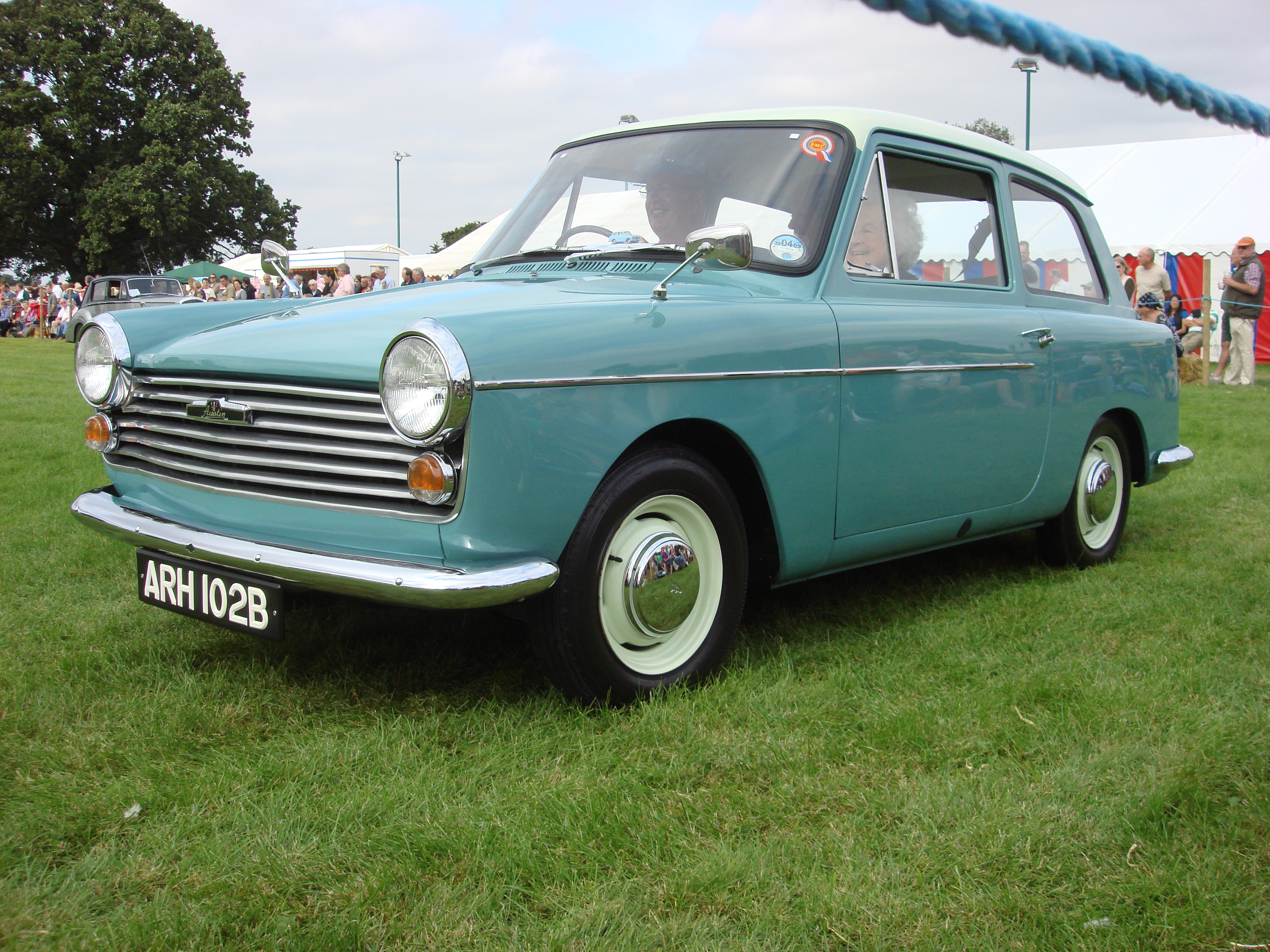
Austin A40 Farina Mark II

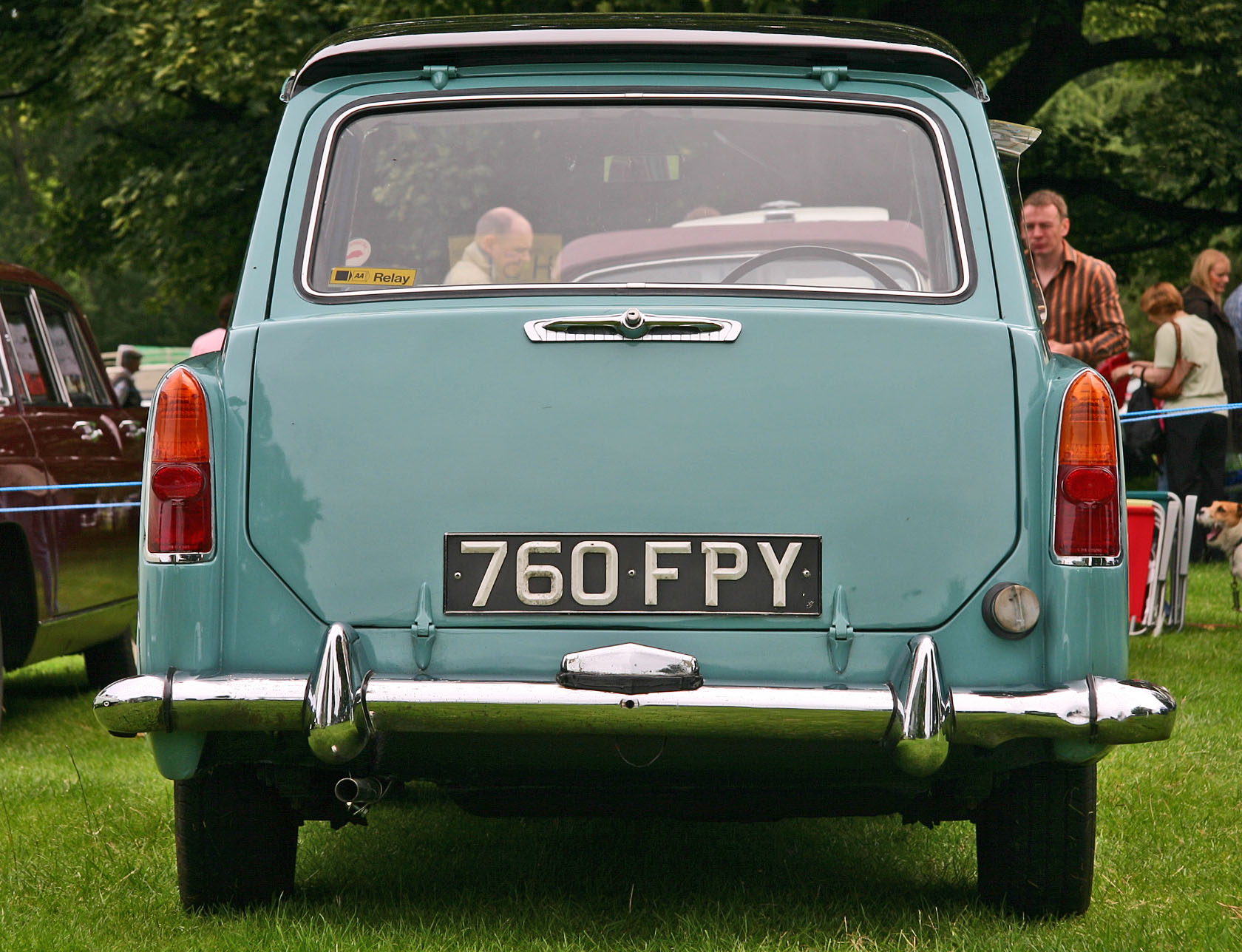
Austin A40 Farina Mark II Countryman

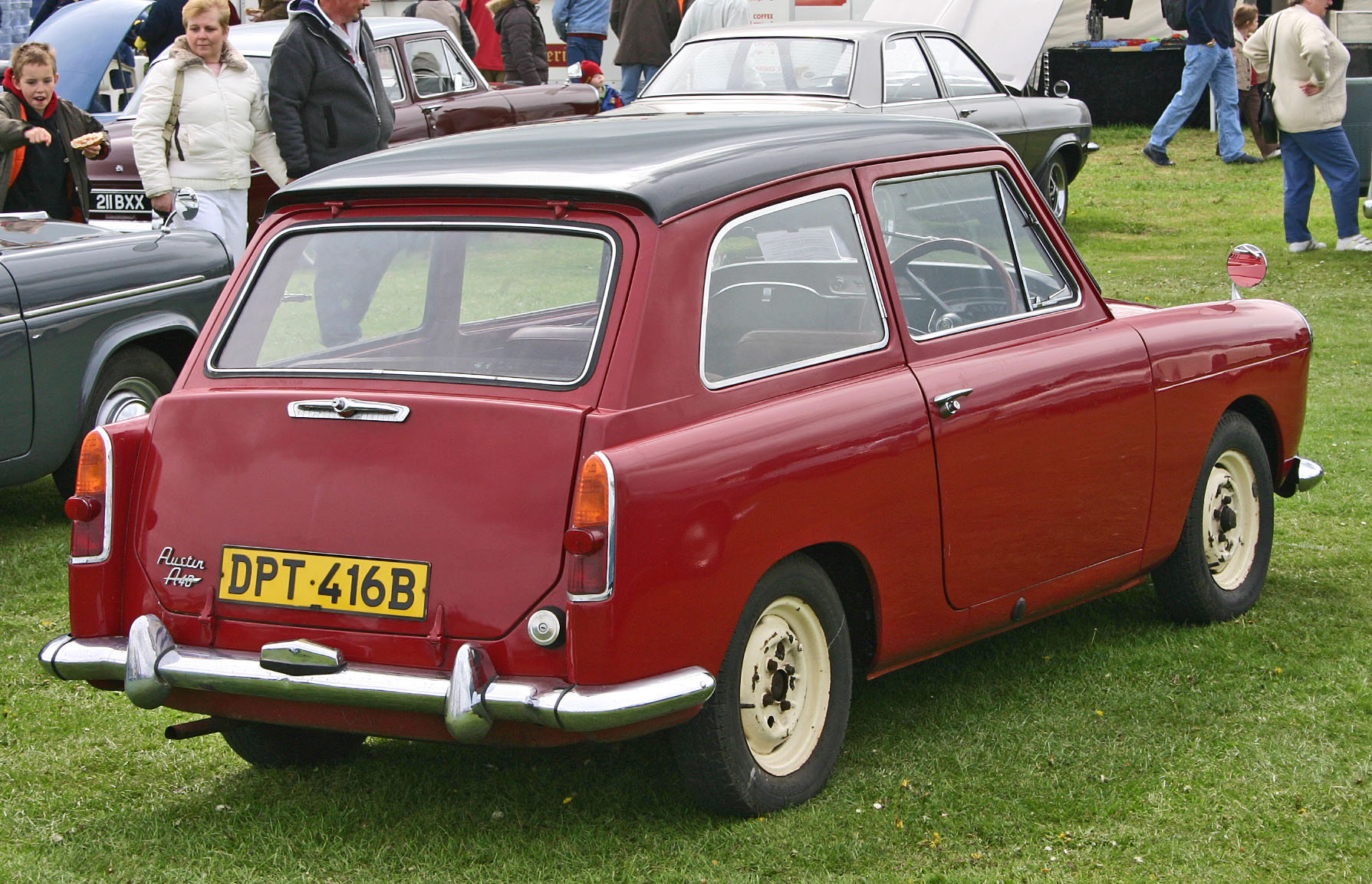
Austin A40 Farina Mark II Countryman

== Engines ==
- 1958–1961: 948 cc A-Series I4, 34 hp (25 kW) at 4750 rpm and 50 ft·lbf (68 Nm) at 2000 rpm
- 1961–1962: 948 cc A-Series I4, 37 hp (28 kW) at 5000 rpm and 50 ft·lbf (68 Nm) at 2500 rpm
- 1962–1967: 1098 cc A-Series I4, 48 hp (36 kW) at 5100 rpm and 60 ft·lbf (81 Nm) at 2500 rpm

== Innocenti ==
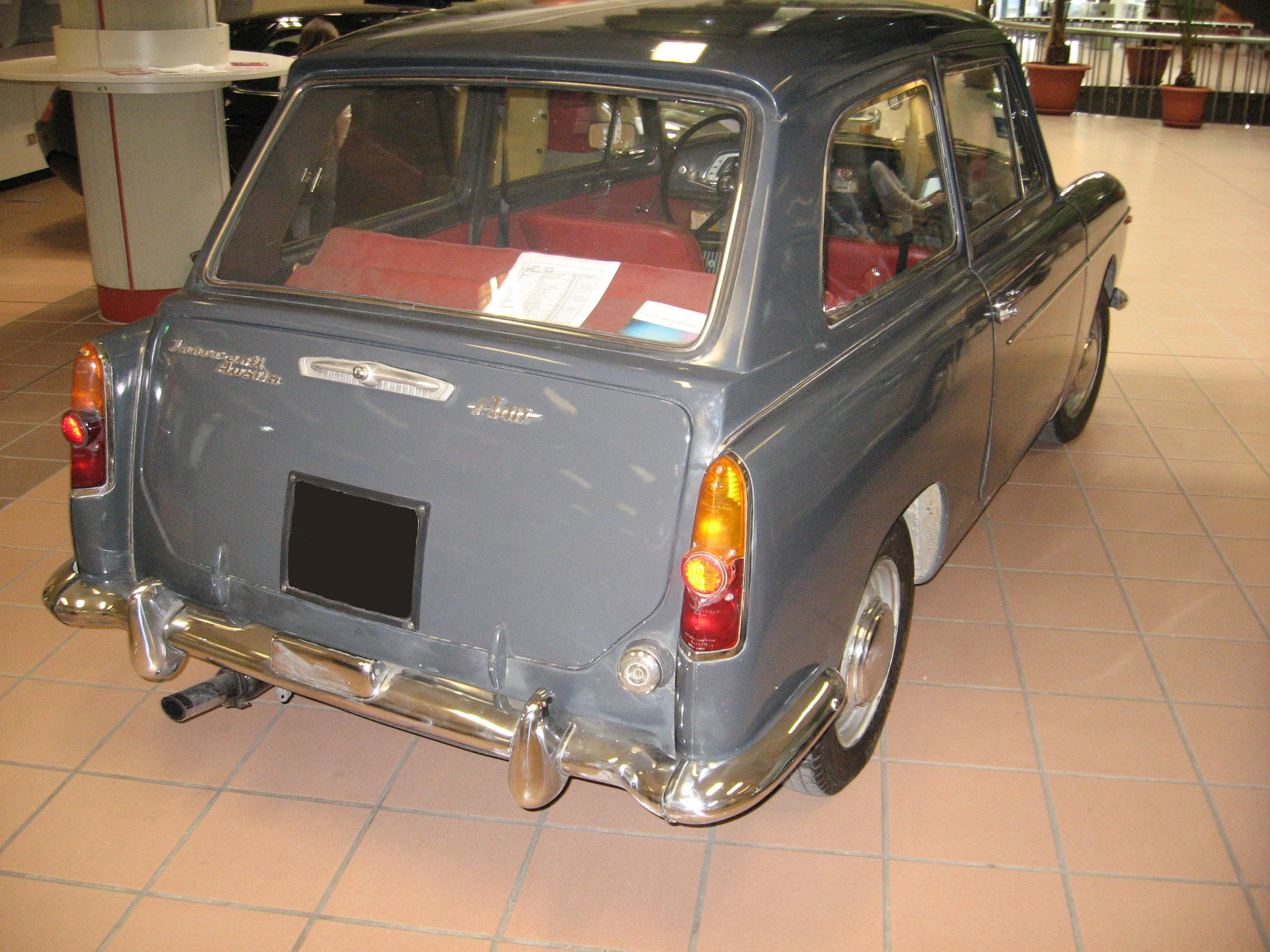
Innocenti A40 saloon

Innocenti also produced A40s (Note: Innocenti of Milan, Italy To Produce B.M.C. Cars, The Times, Thursday, 6 August 1959; pg. 15; Issue 54532; col F) under licence from BMC. They began producing knock-down kit versions of the A40 in 1960 but soon progressed to produce the entire car in Italy. Innocenti's A40 Berlina and Combinata corresponded to the saloon and Countryman versions of the Austin A40 Farina.

The cars began using the larger 1098 cc engine in 1962, being renamed A40S at that time. For 1965 Innocenti also designed a new single-piece rear door for the Combinata. This top-hinged door used struts to hold it up over a wide cargo opening and was a true hatchback – a model never developed in the home (United Kingdom) market. 67,706 Innocenti A40 and A40S cars were produced.

== Australian production and New Zealand assembly ==
The A40 Farina was also produced in Sydney, New South Wales, Australia by the British Motor Corporation (Australia) Pty Ltd from 1959 to 1962. These Australian assembled vehicles had a very high degree of local content.

The A40 was assembled from English CKD kits by NZ importer, the Austin Distributors Federation, at their Petone factory Associated Motor Industries. Local content included items like glass, wiring loom, trim, tyres, battery and radiator.

== Competition history ==
The car was a popular choice, in modified form, for competition work. Several examples are still to be seen taking part in historic saloon racing.

In the January 1959 Monte Carlo Rally driven by Pat Moss and Ann Wisdom the A40 won the Coupe des Dames, Houbigant Cup, RAC Challenge Trophy and Souvenir Award, "L'Officiel de la Couture" and was 2nd in class for standard series production touring cars up to 1000 cc. The little car was 10th in General Classification.

In the closing stages of June's Alpine Rally (Coupe des Alpes), Moss and Wisdom lost the use of first gear on their A40 and were obliged to retire having completed the second stage of the rally still "clean".

In August 1959, in practice at Brands Hatch, Doc Shepherd broke the saloon car record in an Austin A40 and he won the 1960 British Saloon Car Championship, also driving an Austin A40 Farina.
