= 1960 British Saloon Car Championship =

3rd season of the British Touring Car Championship

Seasons
- ← 1959 1961 →

The 1960 SupaTura British Saloon Car Championship was the third season of the championship. This year the championship ran to a 'silhouette' formula with an engine capacity limit of 1000cc. Doc Shepherd won the drivers title with an Austin A40 ran by Don Moore Racing, after finishing as runner-up the previous year.

== Calendar & winners ==
All races were held in the United Kingdom. Overall winners of multi-class races in bold.

Round	Circuit	Date	1000cc Winner	Over 1000cc Winner
1	Brands Hatch, Kent	18 April	George 'Doc' Shepherd	Not contested.
2	Snetterton Motor Racing Circuit, Norfolk	24 April	George 'Doc' Shepherd	**Gawaine Baillie**
3	Mallory Park, Leicestershire	8 May	George 'Doc' Shepherd	Not contested.
4	Oulton Park, Cheshire	6 June	Edward Lewis	**Don Parker**
5	Snetterton Motor Racing Circuit, Norfolk	19 June	George 'Doc' Shepherd	**Jack Sears**
NC	Silverstone Circuit, Northamptonshire	16 July	George 'Doc' Shepherd	**Colin Chapman**
6	Brands Hatch, Kent	1 August	George 'Doc' Shepherd	**Roy Salvadori**
7	Brands Hatch, Kent	29 August	George 'Doc' Shepherd	**Jack Sears**
8	Brands Hatch, Kent	16 October	John Young	**Albert Powell**

== Championship results ==
Driver's championship
Pos.	Driver	Car	Team	Points
1	Doc Shepherd	Austin A40	Don Moore Racing	48
2	John Young	Ford Anglia		30
3	Edward Lewis	Austin A40		13
4	John Aley	Austin A35	Cambridge Racing	6
=	Andrew Hedges	Austin A40	Scuderia Light Blue	6
