= Tommy Sopwith (racing driver) =

British racing driver and businessman (1932–2019)

- Nationality: (United Kingdom) British
- Born: 15 November 1932
- Died: 4 May 2019 (aged 86) Basingstoke, Hampshire, England

British Saloon Car Championship
- Years active: 1958
- Teams: Equipe Endeavour
- Starts: 9
- Wins: 8
- Poles: 2
- Fastest laps: 9
- Best finish: 2nd in 1958

Championship titles
- 1958: British Saloon Car Championship - Class D

Thomas Edward Brodie Sopwith (15 November 1932 – 4 May 2019) was a British businessman and car racing driver.

== Biography ==
Thomas Sopwith was the son of English aviation pioneer and yachtsman Sir Thomas Sopwith – builder of the Sopwith Camel and later chairman of Hawker Aircraft – and Phyllis Brodie. He was educated at Stowe School, Buckinghamshire.

Sopwith took up motor racing and formed his own team, Equipe Endeavour, named after his father's racing yacht. His success as a racing driver saw him win the first-ever round of the British Saloon Car Championship in 1958. That year, he narrowly lost out on the driver's title to Jack Sears after a ten lap shoot-out at the end of the season, after the two drivers finished on equal points. In 1961, he switched from car to powerboat racing. In 1961, he won the first ever Cowes - Torquay race in Thunderbolt, following up with wins in 1968 (Telstar) and 1970 (Miss Enfield II). In 1965, he won the Cornish "100" Offshore Class 3, powerboat race in a boat called 'Thunderflash', just beating Mike Beard in 'Mongaso'.

Sopwith was the owner of Endeavour Holdings Limited, a car dealership in Portslade, Brighton, with a turnover of £17 million.

Sopwith died on 4 May 2019 aged 86 at Basingstoke Hospital.

== Racing record ==
=== Complete British Saloon Car Championship results ===
(key) (Races in bold indicate pole position; races in italics indicate fastest lap.)

Year	Team	Car	Class	1	2	3	4	5	6	7	8	9	DC	Pts	Class
1958	Equipe Endeavour	Jaguar 3.4-Litre	D	BRH; 1†	BRH; 1‡	MAL; Ret†	BRH; 1†	BRH; 1†	**CRY**; 1†	BRH; 1	**BRH**; 1	BRH; 1	**2nd**	**48**	**1st**

† Events with 2 races staged for the different classes.

‡ Event with 3 races staged for the different classes.
