= Edward VII 2d Tyrian plum =

British postage stamp

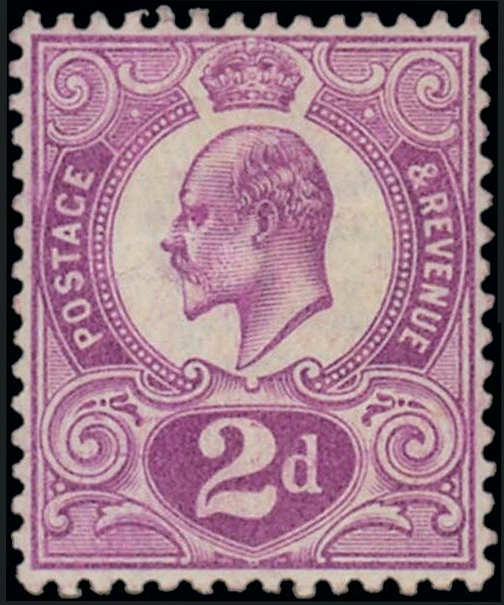
- Country of production: United Kingdom of Great Britain and Ireland
- Location of production: London
- Date of production: 1910
- Nature of rarity: Few exist
- No. in existence: Unknown
- Face value: 2 penny £sd
- Estimated value: £110,000

The two pence (2d) Tyrian plum was a postage and revenue stamp produced by Britain in 1910 as a replacement for the existing two colour 2d stamp of King Edward VII.

One hundred thousand sheets, totalling 24,000,000 stamps, were printed by De La Rue and delivered to the post office stores for distribution to postmasters. The circulation of the new stamps was delayed while existing stocks of the current stamp were used up so that the change would take effect at one time and the amount of surplus stock of the old value would be kept to a minimum. However following the death of Edward VII on 6 May 1910, it was decided not to issue the new stamp and almost all the stock was destroyed. Only a few examples survive in private hands, making this stamp one of the great rarities of British philately.

A single used on cover example is known, which was sent by the then Prince of Wales, later King George V, to himself. This example is in the Royal Philatelic Collection.

Additionally, a complete imperforate registration sheet of 240 stamps is in the British Postal Museum & Archive along with a perforated sheet of 139 stamps.
