= Austin A30 =

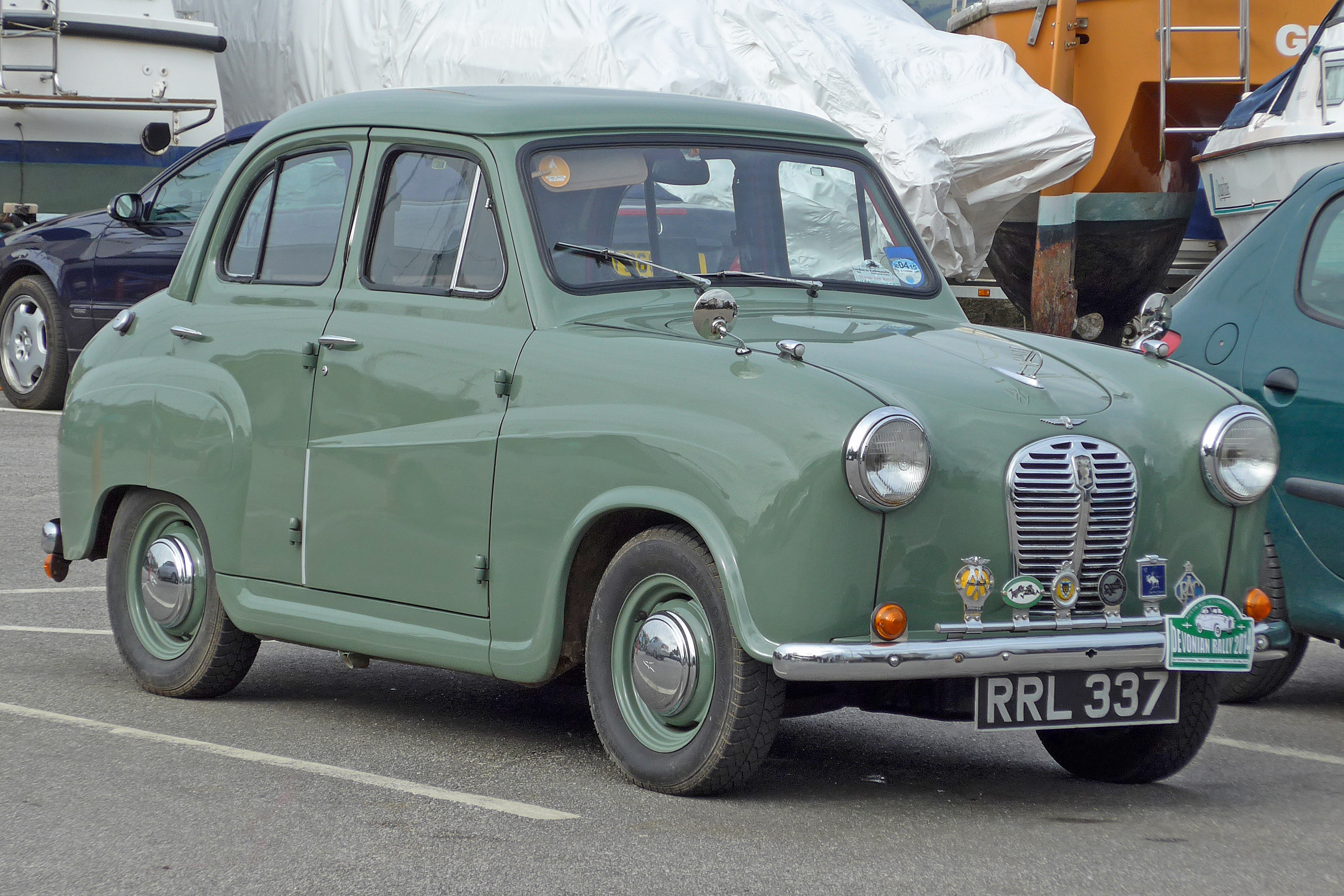
- Austin A30 4-door saloon

Overview
- Manufacturer: Austin (BMC)
- Also called: Austin Seven
- Production: 1951–1956
- Assembly: United Kingdom: Longbridge (Longbridge plant); Australia: Melbourne

Body and chassis
- Class: Compact car / Small family car (C)
- Body style: 4-door saloon 2-door saloon 2-door estate 2-door van

Powertrain
- Engine: 803 cc A-Series I4
- Transmission: 4-speed manual

Dimensions
- Wheelbase: 79.5 in (2,019 mm)
- Length: 136.5 in (3,467 mm)
- Width: 55 in (1,397 mm)

Chronology
- Predecessor: Austin 8
- Successor: Austin A35; Austin Mini

The Austin A30 is a small family car produced by Austin from May 1952 to September 1956. It was launched at the 1951 Earls Court Motor Show as the "New Austin Seven" and was Austin's competitor with the Morris Minor.

At launch, the car cost £507 (equivalent to £15,793.36 in 2019) undercutting the Minor by £62.

== Styling ==
Holden "Bob" Koto, from the Raymond Loewy design studios, created the first clay models for the A30. Austin then had its Head of Styling, Dick Burzi, revise the design, partly to reduce cost.

== Features ==
The body structure was designed by T.K. Garrett, who had been an aeronautical engineer before joining Austin. It was of fully stressed monocoque chassis-less construction, which made it lighter and stiffer than most contemporary vehicles, the first Austin to be made in this way. Inside there were individual seats at the front and a bench at the rear covered in PVC with an option of leather facings on the seats. Evidence of economy was seen in the original AS3 version only having a single windscreen wiper, central combined stop/tail/numberplate lamp and a sun visor in front of the driver only. A passenger-side wiper and sun visor, and a heater were available as optional extras. The AS3 was also different to later models with a round speedometer and side mounted fuel filler neck. A smaller grille was fitted and an Austin winged badge mounted just above.

Originally only offered as a 4-door saloon, 2-door variants were introduced in late 1953, and in 1954 a van and van-based "Countryman" estate were made available. These later A30 had the trapezoidal speedo and dual brake/side lights. The fuel filler neck also moved to the rear panel as in the later A35 models. Despite having a smaller loading capacity than the equivalent BMC O-type Minor based vans (60 cu ft / 1.70 m^{3} as opposed to 76 cu ft / 2.15 m^{3}) the Austin van offered the same payload. Being slightly lighter and stiffer, it was favoured by businessmen, and saw long service for many. One prototype Sports Tourer was built but the vehicle was never put into production. That prototype is on display at the British Motor Museum at Gaydon in the UK.

The A30 was replaced by the Austin A35 in 1956, by which time 223,264 A30s had been built.

The A30 has a smaller rear window than the A35, and trafficators instead of modern indicators, which swung out from the B pillar when operated by a knob mounted on the centre of the dashboard.

The car, along with the larger-engined (and hence faster) A35, was quite successful in 1950s saloon car racing, and some still appear in historic events.

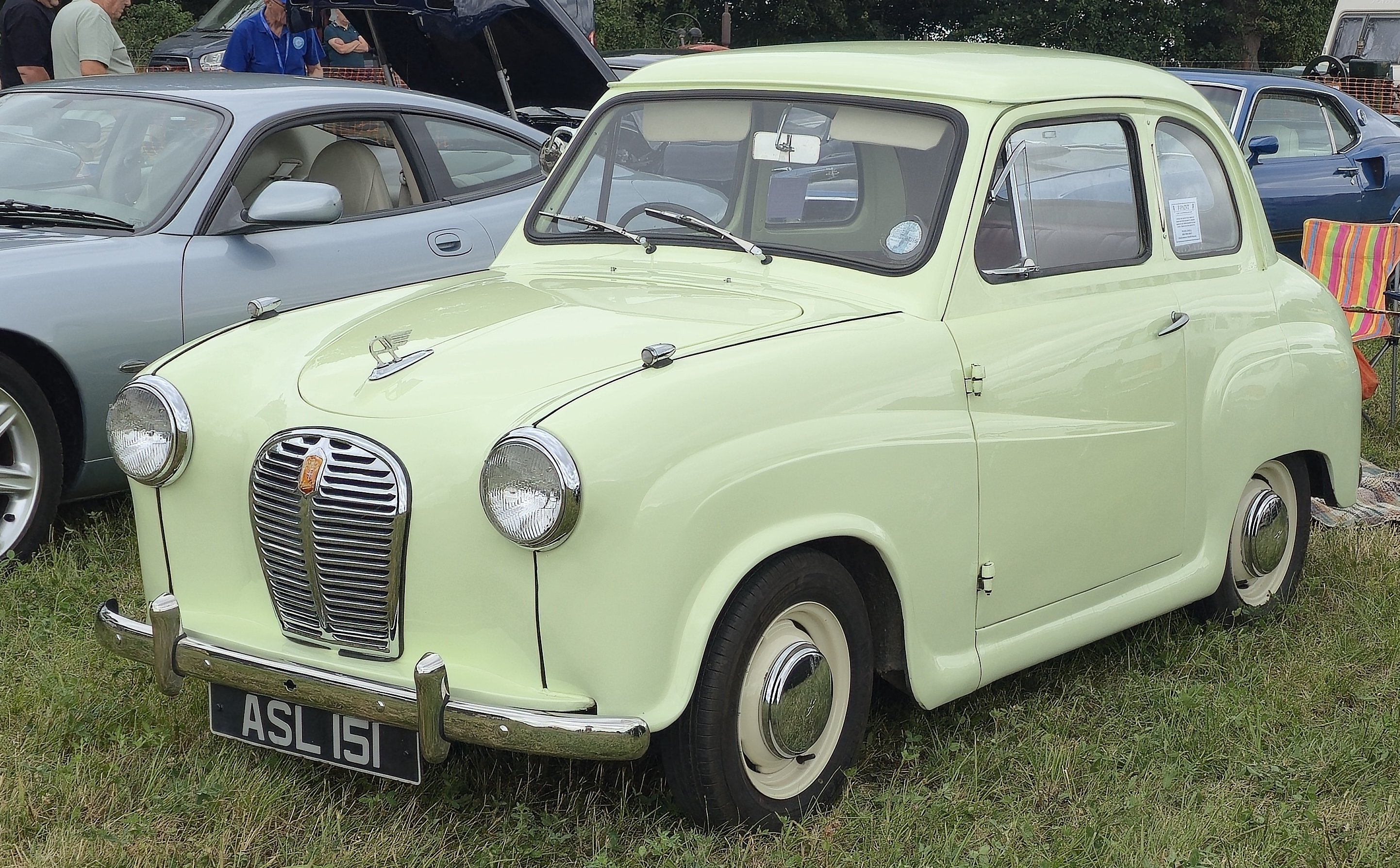
Austin A30 2-door saloon

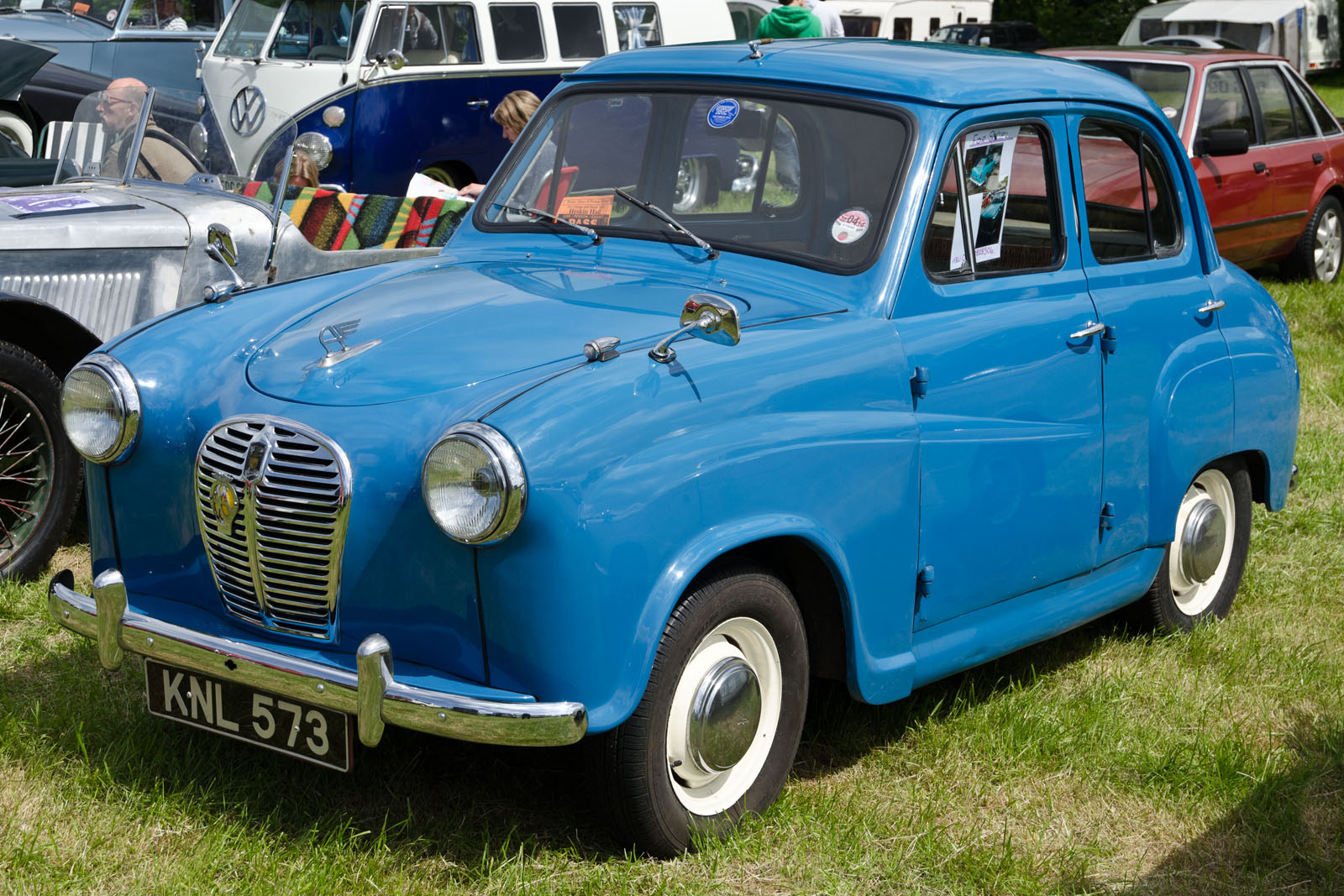
Austin A30 4-door saloon

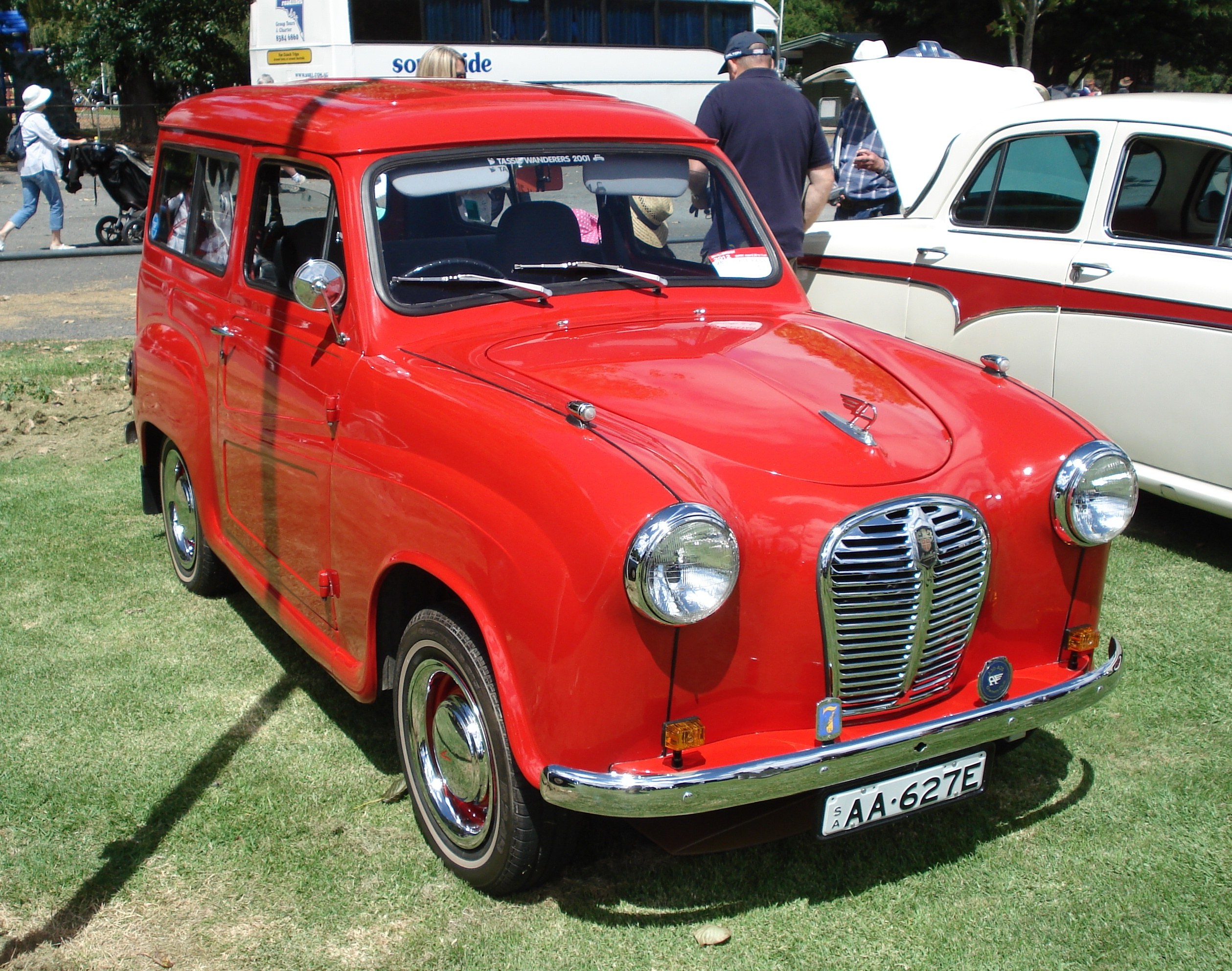
Austin A30 Countryman estate

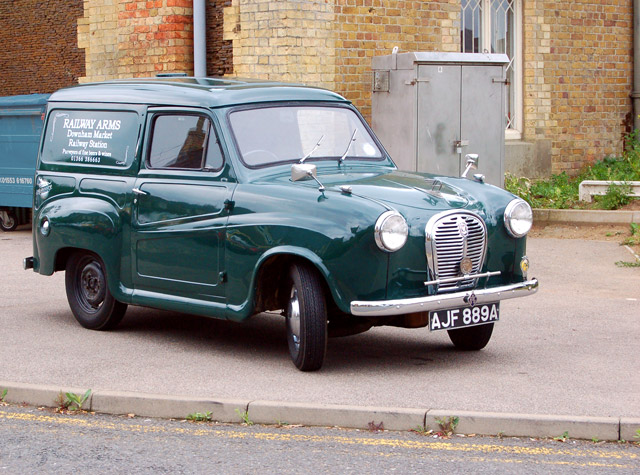
Austin A30 5 cwt delivery van

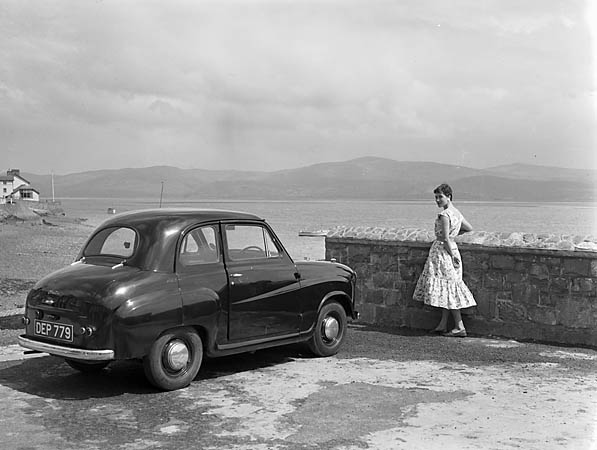
Promotional image of The Austin A30 in Barmouth (1956)

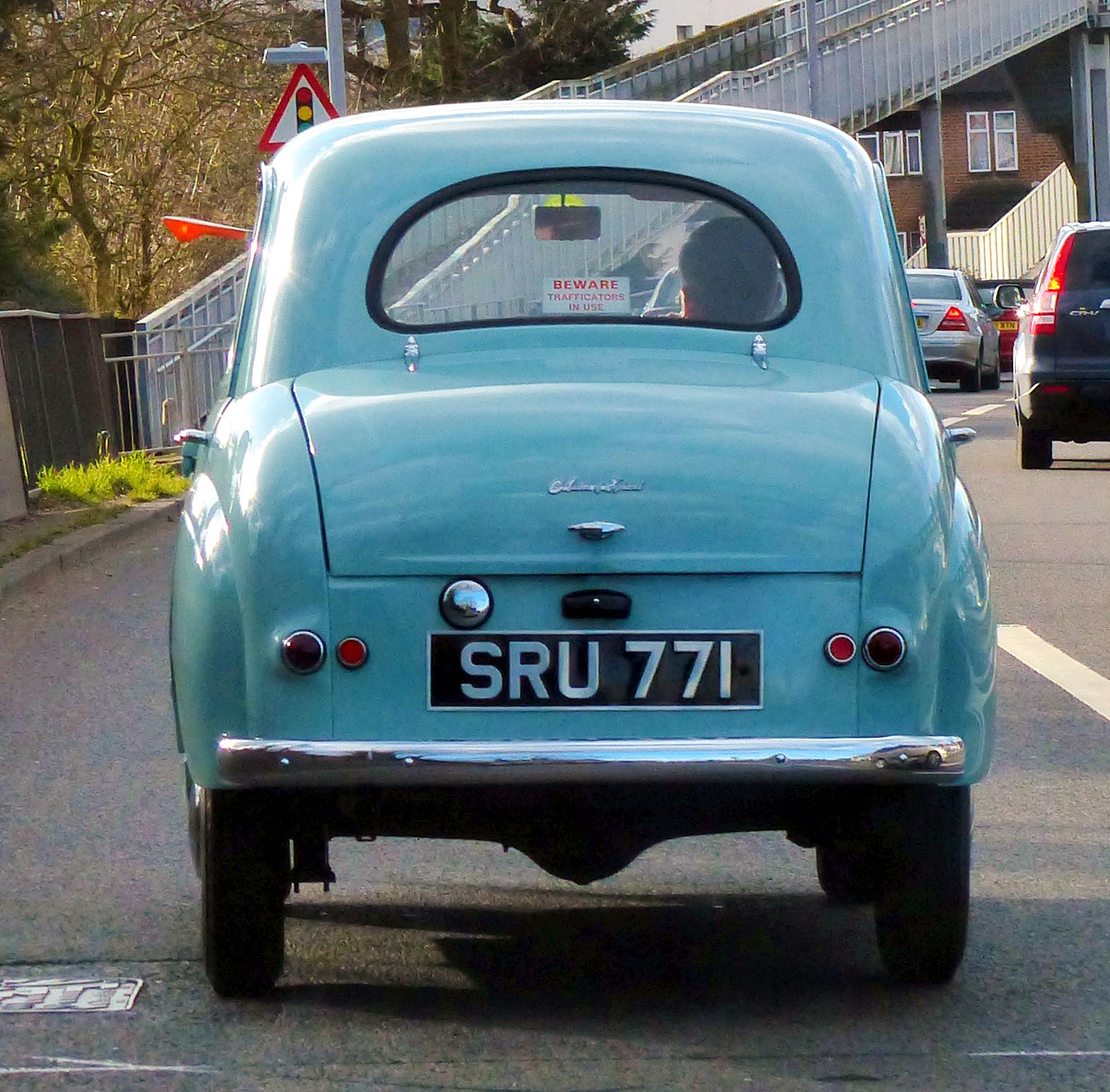
Austin A30 with trafficator deployed

== Performance ==
The car's newly designed A-Series straight-4 engine was state of the art for the time and returned an average fuel consumption of 42 mpg / under 7L/100 km. With spirited driving the A30 was able to attain a top speed of 70 mph (110 km/h) (factory quoted). In its road test The Motor magazine achieved a top speed of 67.2 mph (108.1 km/h) and a 0–60 mph time of 42.3 seconds. Braking was effected by a hybrid system, with Lockheed fully hydraulic drum brakes at the front and body-mounted single-cylinder operating rods to the rear wheels, which despite being heavily criticised as archaic and old-fashioned, were reported to be quite acceptable. The rod system provided good handbrake efficiency and was applied by a lever in an unorthodox position to the right of the driver's seat (Right hand drive vehicles). Bumps were handled by independent coil springs at the front end and beam axle/semi-elliptic leaf springs at the back.

A car tested by The Motor magazine in 1952 had a top speed of 62 mph (100 km/h) and could accelerate from 0–50 mph (80 km/h) in 29 seconds. A fuel consumption of 38.8 miles per imperial gallon (7.28 L/100 km; 32.3 mpg_{‑US}) was recorded. The test car cost £553 including taxes. The optional radio was an extra £43 and the heater £9. Performance data need to be seen in the context of fuel availability. Early in the Second World War "branded fuel" disappeared from sale in the UK, and the nationally available fuel available at the beginning of 1952 had an octane rating of just 70, which enforced relatively low compression ratios: this reduced the performance available from all cars, especially small ones. In 1952 branded fuels returned to the forecourts, available octane ratings began to increase, and compression ratios were progressively improved along with the performance figures of cars such as the Austin A30 and its A35 successor.

== Australian production ==
The A30 was produced in Australia by the Austin Motor Company (Australia) Pty Ltd from 1952 to 1954 and by its successor, the British Motor Corporation (Australia) Pty Ltd from 1954 to 1956.

== Engine ==
- 803 cc BMC A-Series engine inline 4.
- 58 mm bore x 76 mm stroke
- pushrod-operated overhead valves
- compression ratio 7.2:1
- single Zenith 26JS or 26VME carburettor
- 28 bhp (21 kW) at 4400 rpm
- 40 lbf·ft (54 Nm) at 2200 rpm

== New Austin Seven and Austin A30 Seven ==
Early sales literature used the names New Austin Seven and Austin A30 Seven.
