= 1961 British Saloon Car Championship =

4th season of the British Touring Car Championship

Seasons
- ← 1960 1962 →

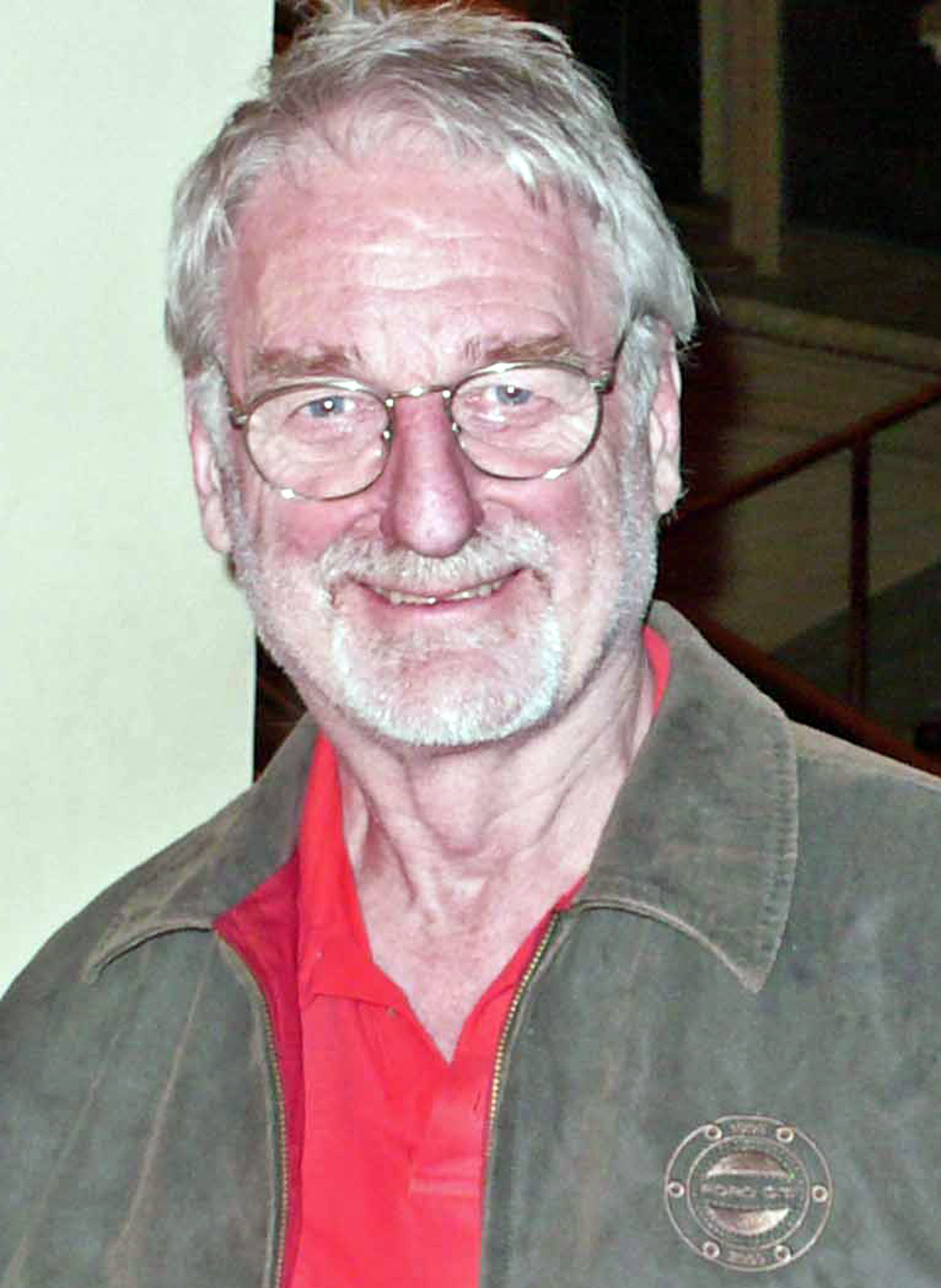
1961 BRSCC champion, John Whitmore

The 1961 BRSCC British Saloon Car Championship, was the fourth season of the championship. It began at Snetterton on 25 March and finished after 9 races back at Snetterton on 30 September. The championship switched to the new Group 2 regulations. This year saw the first championship win for a Mini, with a car driven by John Whitmore, winning the title in his debut season.

== Calendar & Winners ==
All races were held in the United Kingdom. Overall winners in bold.

Round	Circuit	Date	Class A Winner	Class B Winner	Class C Winner	Class D Winner
1	Snetterton Motor Racing Circuit, Norfolk	25 March	(United Kingdom) George 'Doc' Shepherd	(United Kingdom) Alan Hutcheson	None (no entries?)	(United Kingdom) **Gawaine Baillie**
2	Goodwood Circuit, West Sussex	3 April	(United Kingdom) John Whitmore	(United Kingdom) Bill Blydenstein	(United Kingdom) Ellis Cuff-Miller	(United Kingdom) **Mike Parkes**
3	Aintree Motor Racing Circuit, Liverpool	22 April	(United Kingdom) John Whitmore	(United Kingdom) Alan Hutcheson	(United Kingdom) Chris Kerrison?	(United Kingdom) **Roy Salvadori**
4	Silverstone Circuit, Northamptonshire	6 May	(United Kingdom) Bill Aston	(United Kingdom) Peter Harper	(United Kingdom) Chris Kerrison?	(United Kingdom) **Graham Hill**
5	Crystal Palace Circuit, London	22 May	(United Kingdom) George 'Doc' Shepherd	(United Kingdom) Bill Blydenstein	None (no entries)	(United Kingdom) **Roy Salvadori**
6	Silverstone Circuit, Northamptonshire	8 July	(Germany) Herbert Linge	(United Kingdom) Ellis Cuff-Miller	(United Kingdom) Chris Kerrison	(United Kingdom) **Mike Parkes**
7	Brands Hatch, Kent	7 August	(New Zealand) Frank Hamlin	(United Kingdom) Alan Hutcheson	(United Kingdom) Chris Kerrison	(United Kingdom) **Mike Parkes**
8	Oulton Park, Cheshire	23 September	(United Kingdom) John Whitmore	(United Kingdom) Peter Harper	None (no entries?)	(United Kingdom) **Roy Salvadori**
9	Snetterton Motor Racing Circuit, Norfolk	30 September	(United Kingdom) George 'Doc' Shepherd	(United Kingdom) Peter Harper	None (no entries?)	(United Kingdom) **Mike Parkes**

== Championship results ==
Driver's championship
Pos.	Driver	Car	Team	Group	Points
1	(United Kingdom) John Whitmore	Austin Mini Seven	Don Moore	A	53
2	(United Kingdom) Mike Parkes	Jaguar Mk II 3.8	Equipe Endeavour	D	44
3	(United Kingdom) Alan Hutcheson	Riley 1.5	Barwell Motorsport	D	42
4	(United Kingdom) Bill Blydenstein	Borgward Isabella TS		B	42
5	(United Kingdom) Roy Salvadori	Jaguar Mk II 3.8	John Coombs	D	37
6	(United Kingdom) Graham Hill	Jaguar Mk II 3.8	Equipe Endeavour	D	28
7	(United Kingdom) Peter Harper	Sunbeam Rapier	Sunbeam Talbot Ltd	B	27
8	(United Kingdom) John Aley	Austin Mini Seven; Morris Mini Minor	Don Moore	A	23
9	(United Kingdom) Edward Lewis	Austin Mini Seven; Riley 1.5		B	22?
10	(United Kingdom) Bill Aston	Morris Mini Minor	Downton Engineering Ltd	A	20
11	(United Kingdom) Doc Shepherd	Austin Mini Seven		A	18
12	(United Kingdom) Chris Kerrison	Jaguar Mk II 2.4	Gerrards Cross Motor Co.	C	16
