= Austin A35 =

Small family car

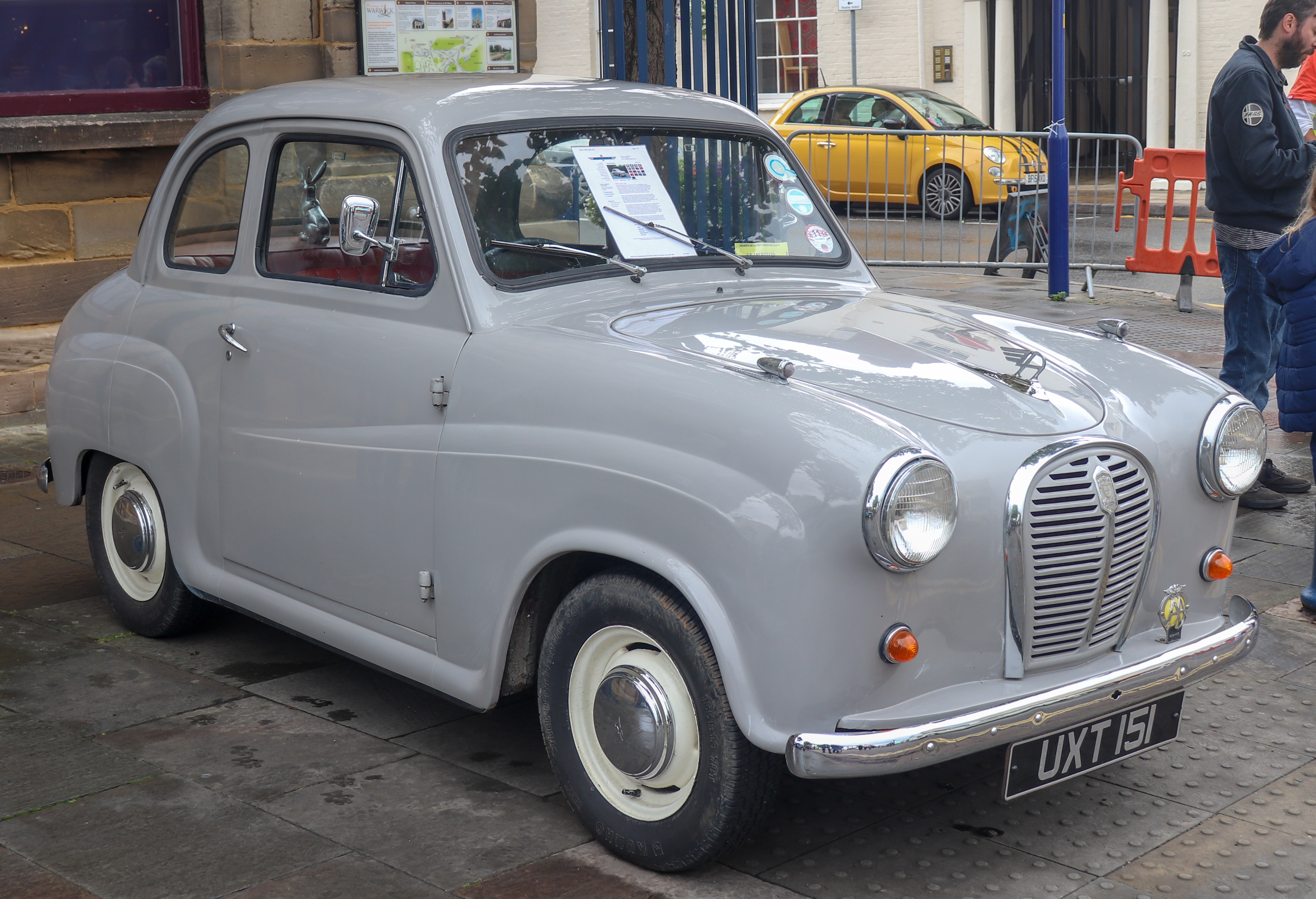

Overview
- Manufacturer: Austin (BMC)
- Production: 1956–1959 (saloon); 1956–1962 (estate); 1956–1968 (van); 280,897 produced
- Assembly: United Kingdom: Longbridge (Longbridge plant)

Body and chassis
- Class: Small family car (C)
- Body style: 2/4-door saloon 2-door estate 2-door coupe utility (pickup); 2-door sedan delivery (van)
- Layout: FR layout

Powertrain
- Engine: 948 cc A-Series I4; 1,098 cc A-Series I4

Dimensions
- Wheelbase: 79.5 in (2,019 mm)
- Length: 136.5 in (3,467 mm)
- Width: 55 in (1,397 mm)

Chronology
- Predecessor: Austin A30
- Successor: Austin A40 Farina; Mini

The Austin A35 is a small family car that was sold by Austin from 1956 until 1968. About 280,897 A35s of all types were produced.

== Design ==
Introduced in 1956, it replaced the highly successful Austin A30. The name reflected the larger and more powerful 34 hp (25 kW) A-Series inline-four engine, enabling a slightly higher top speed and better acceleration.

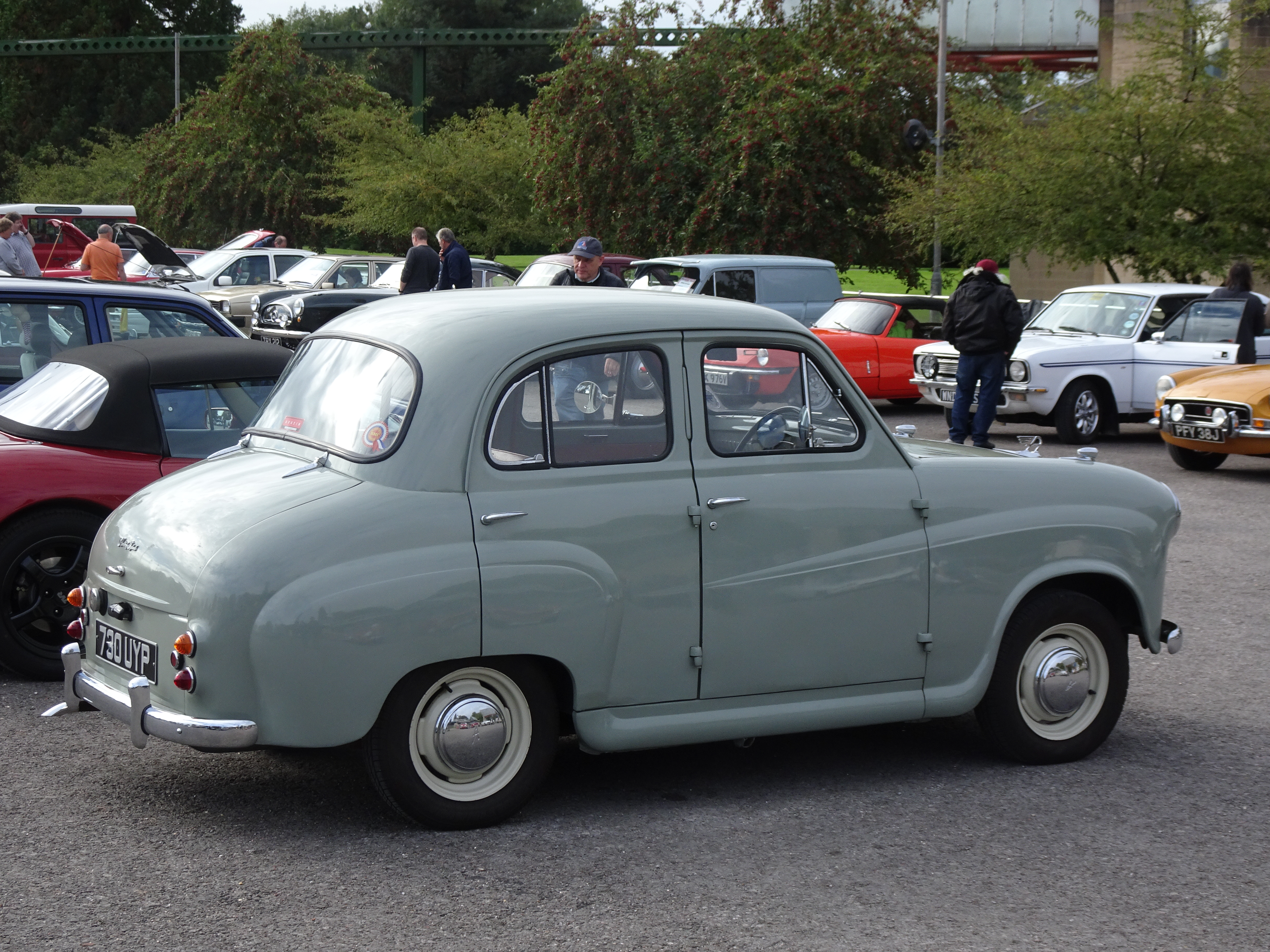
A35 4-door Saloon

The A35 is very similar in appearance to the A30, except for a larger rear window aperture and a painted front grille, with chrome horse-shoe surround, instead of the chrome grille on the A30. Both have 13 in (330 mm) wheels. The semaphore turn-signal indicators were replaced with modern front- and rear-mounted flashing lights. A slightly easier to operate remote-control gear-change was provided. Much of the improved performance is a result of the 948cc engine and different gearbox ratios. The A30 has the first three ratios close together then a big gap to top (fourth gear). The A35's ratios are better spaced and give a higher speed in third gear. Like the A30, the A35 was offered as a two- or four-door saloon and two-door "Countryman" estate and also as a van. The latter model continued in production through to 1968. A rare coupe utility (pickup) version was also produced in 1956, with just 477 sold. Drawings were made for a sports tourer based on the A30, but no A35 prototype was actually built.

The A35 passenger cars were replaced by the new body shape A40 Farina models in 1959 but the estate car version continued until 1962 and van until 1968.

== Performance ==
A two-door de luxe saloon with the 948 cc engine was tested by the British Motor magazine in 1956 and was found to have a top speed of 71.9 mph (115.7 km/h) and could accelerate from 0-60 mph (97 km/h) in 30.1 seconds. A fuel consumption of 41.5 miles per imperial gallon (6.81 L/100 km; 34.6 mpg_{‑US}) was recorded.

Referring to the A35:

"...The new cars were thoroughly proved by tests carried out on the German autobahnen, during which drivers of much larger cars were astonished to be passed by three small Austins which were being driven flat out all day, averaging 60 mph for 25000 miles!..."

".....a privately-owned works-tuned A35 was driven for seven days around the Montlhéry track, near Paris, in a record-breaking run at an average speed of 75 mph, covering nearly 12500 miles...."

With standard fit of drums all round, in both the A30 and the A35, the front hydraulic with rear hydro-mechanical brakes (the hydraulics acted upon the hand brake at the rear) needed regular adjustment to keep the stopping distances reasonably short.

The A35 was quite successful in 1950s saloon car racing, until supplanted by the Farina A40, but some still appear in historic events.

In recent years a special Academy class of racing has been introduced by the HRDC (Historic Racing Drivers Club), featuring A30 and A35 saloons.

== Production ==
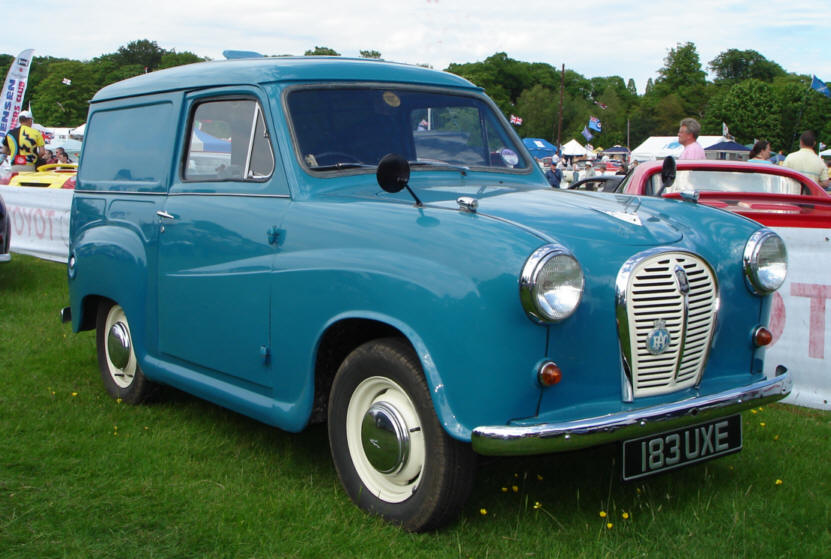
A35 van

- Saloons A2S5: (two-door) 100,284,
- Saloons AS5: (four-door) 28,961,
- Saloons Total: 129,245
- Van & Countryman, AV5 & AP5: 138,356
- Van AV6: 13,222
- Countryman AP6: 74
- Van AV8 (1098cc): 45,685
- Van AV8 (848cc): 14,230
- Pick-up: 477
- CKD (completely knocked down) 13,320
- Total: 354,609

== Engines ==
- 1956–1962: 948 cc A-Series I4, 34 hp (25 kW) at 4,750 rpm and 50 lb·ft (68 Nm) at 2,000 rpm
- 1962–1966: 1,098 cc A-Series I4, 55 hp (41 kW) at 5,500 rpm and 61 lb·ft (83 Nm) at 2,500 rpm (van)
- 1963–1968: 848 cc A-Series I4, 34 hp (25 kW) at 5500rpm and 44 lb·ft (60 N·m) at 2,900rpm (van)

== In popular culture ==
The A35 van features frequently in the Wallace & Gromit films, being the protagonists' main mode of transport since The Curse of the Were-Rabbit (2005). It has since reappeared in A Matter of Loaf and Death (2008), Vengeance Most Fowl (2024) and various Wallace & Gromit videogames.
