= Dick Burzi =

Argentine automobile designer

- Born: Ricardo Burzi c. 1900; Buenos Aires, Argentina
- Died: unknown
- Occupation: automotive designer

Ricardo Burzi (c. 1900 – ?) was an Argentine automotive designer, best known for his work with the Austin Motor Company in Birmingham, England.

Burzi was born around 1900 in Buenos Aires, the capital of Argentina, to a French mother. By 1929 he was working in Italy for Lancia, but was forced to leave after drawing cartoons belittling Benito Mussolini that were published in several newspapers. Initially, Lancia moved Burzi to their coachbuilding firm in Paris. However, he was soon recruited by Lord Austin to work at Longbridge in Birmingham, after Austin received a recommendation from Vincenzo Lancia, whom he met while travelling to the United States. Passenger lists show that, on 3 January 1929, Austin and Lancia both arrived at New York aboard RMS Berengaria (not the often-quoted RMS Queen Mary, which entered service in 1936).

Burzi arrived at Longbridge speaking no English, but was soon known universally as "Dick". His first designs for the Austin 16 were considered too advanced for conservative British tastes by Lord Austin, but in 1938 Burzi was appointed head of styling by the incoming works manager at Longbridge, Leonard Lord. Burzi's Italian background saw him interned on the Isle of Man when Italy entered the Second World War in 1940, but he was released in 1943, and started work on designing the Austin A40 Devon.

Notable cars designed by Burzi in the post-war era included the Austin A30/A35, the Austin A40 Devon, Somerset and Cambridge, the Austin A70 Hampshire/Hereford, the Austin A90 Atlantic, and the Austin A110/A125 Sheerline.

Some of Dick Burzi's designs
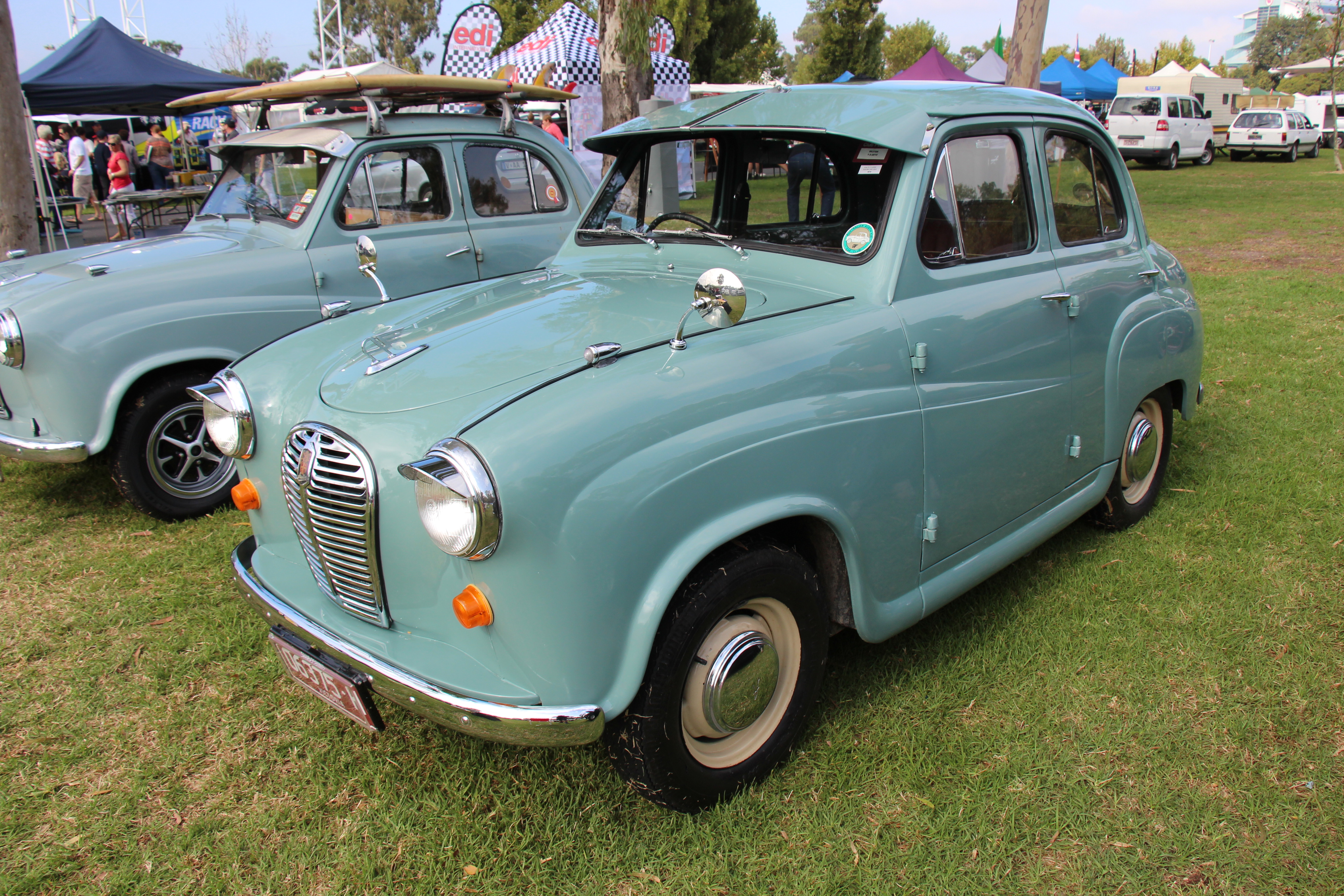
A30, with 4 doors and added indicators

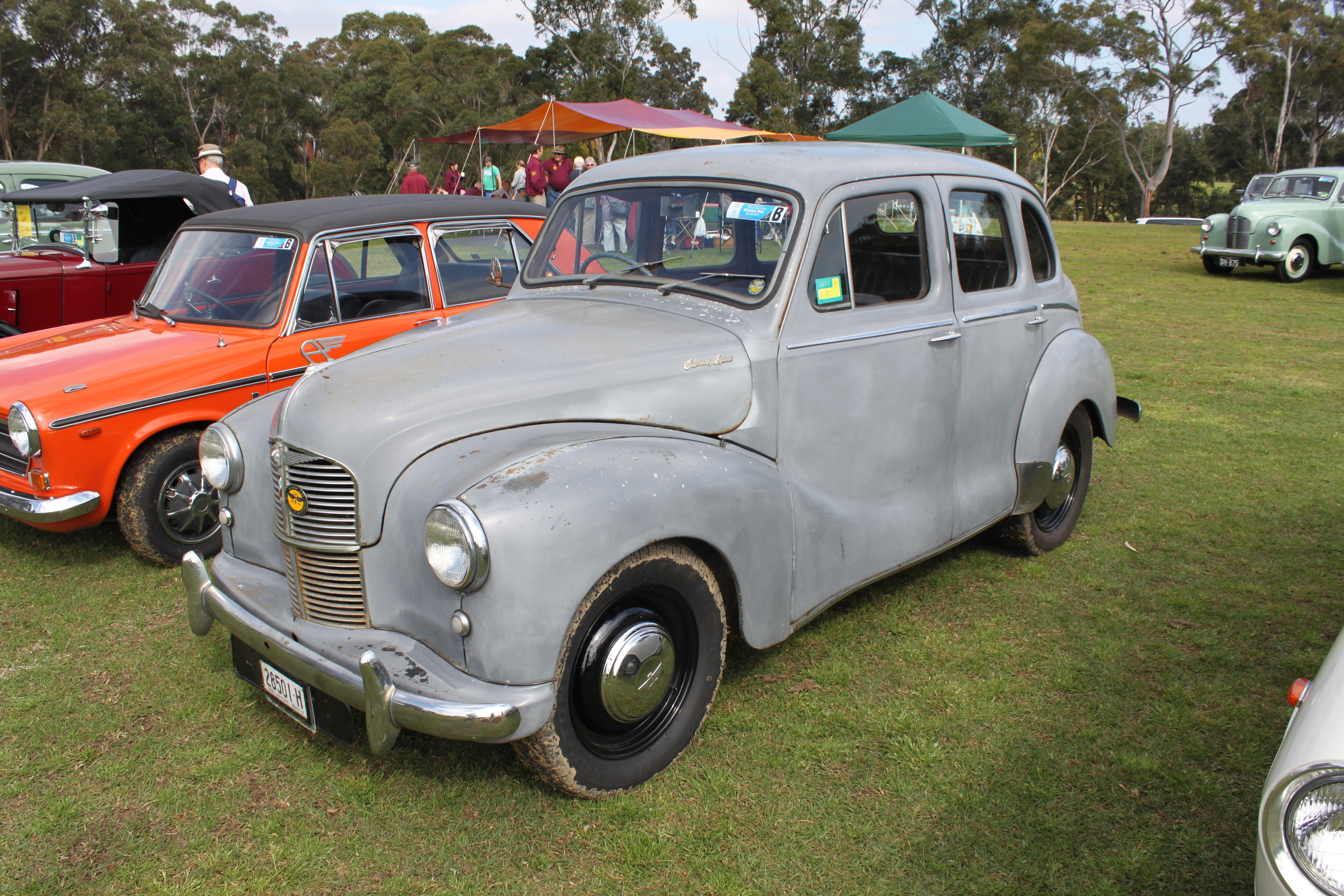
A40 Devon

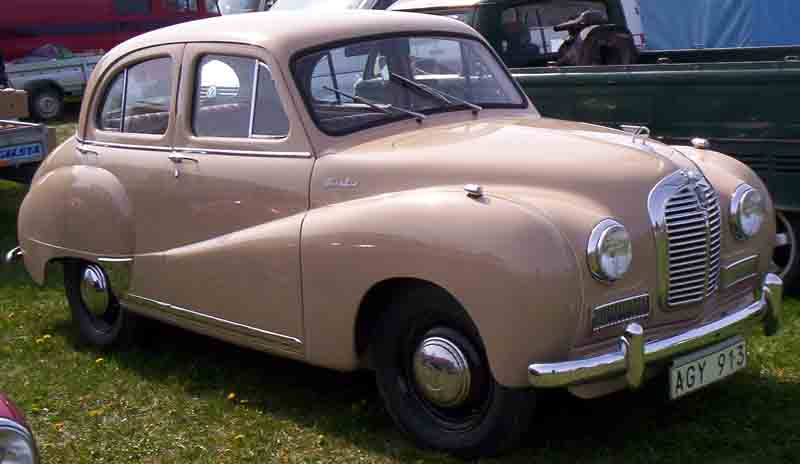
A40 Somerset (1952)

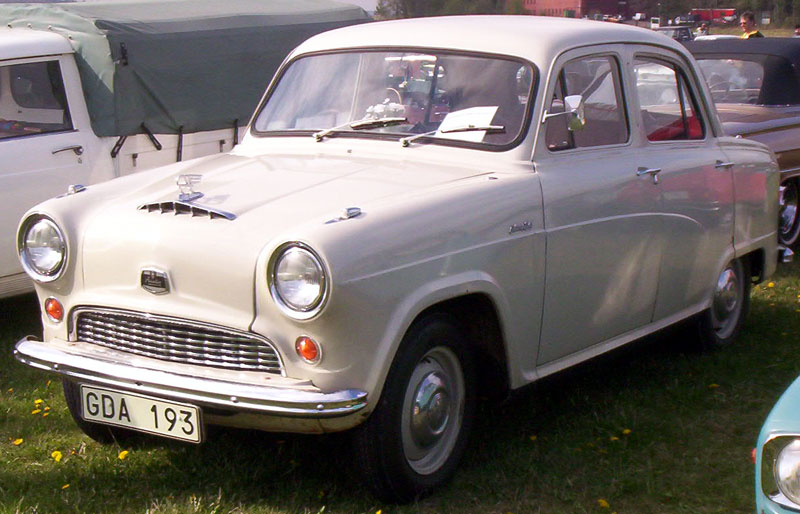
A40 Cambridge (1956)

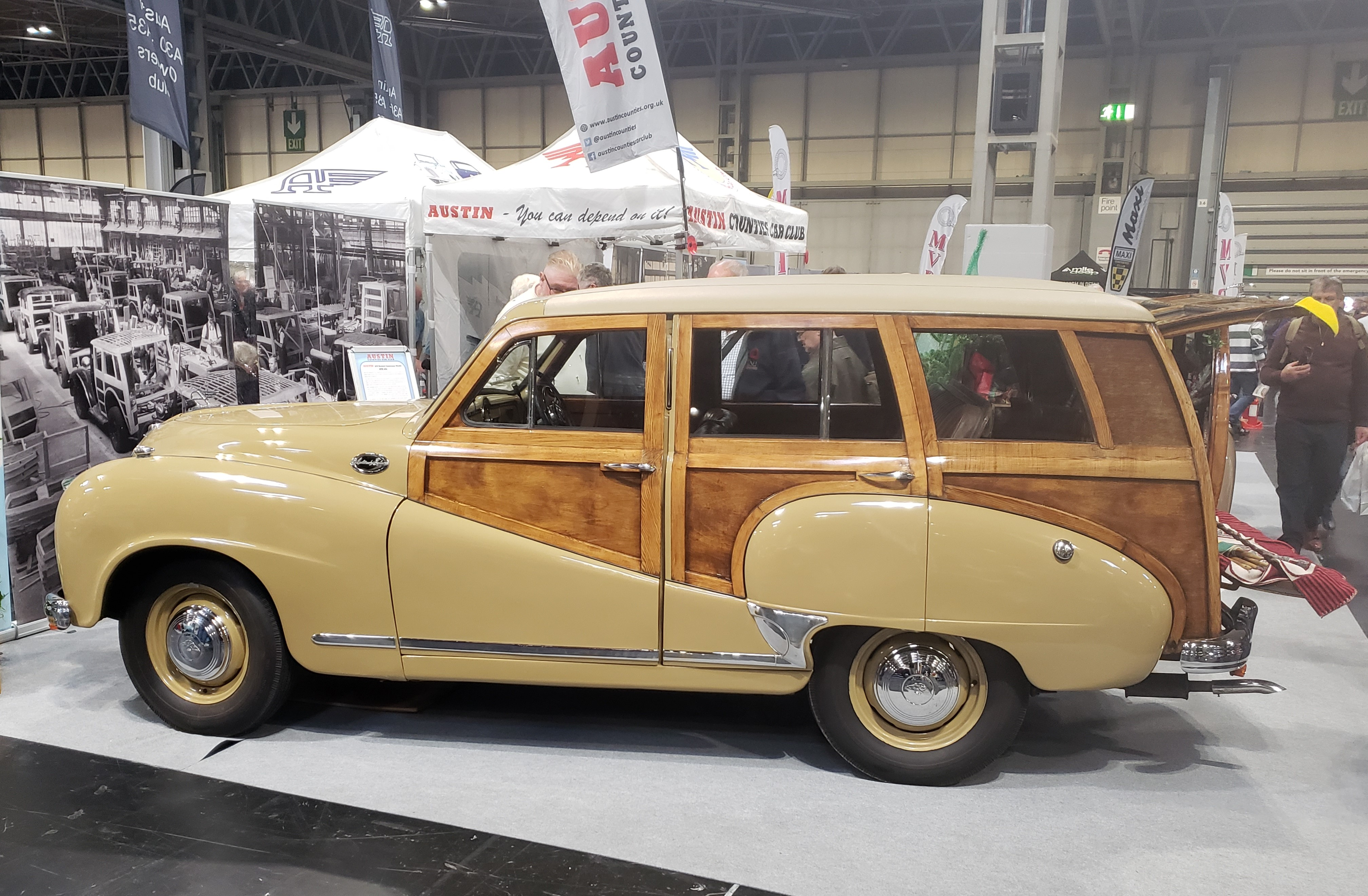
A70 Hereford Countryman (1953)

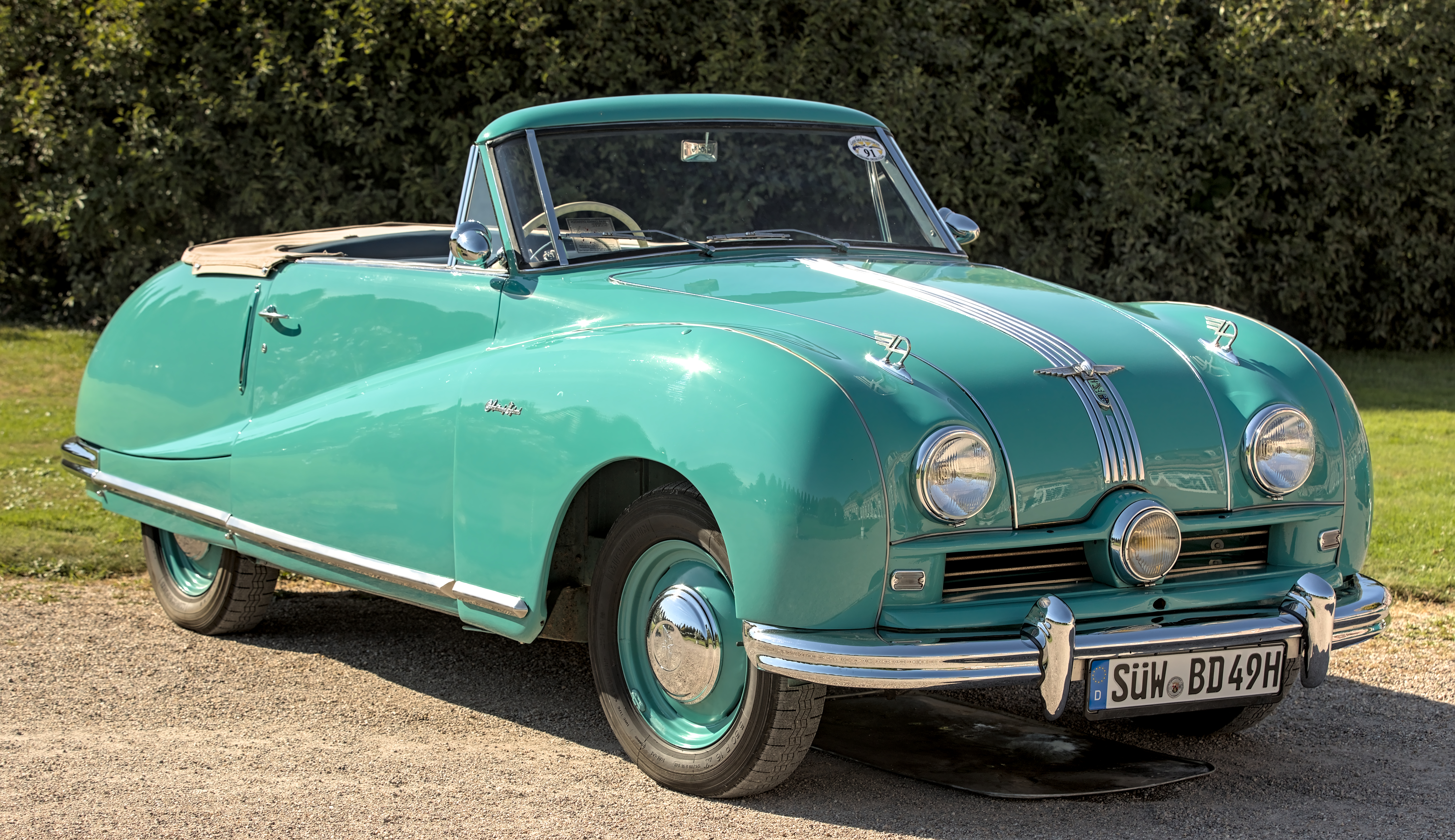
A90 Atlantic convertible (1949), showing third headlight and dual "Flying A" motifs

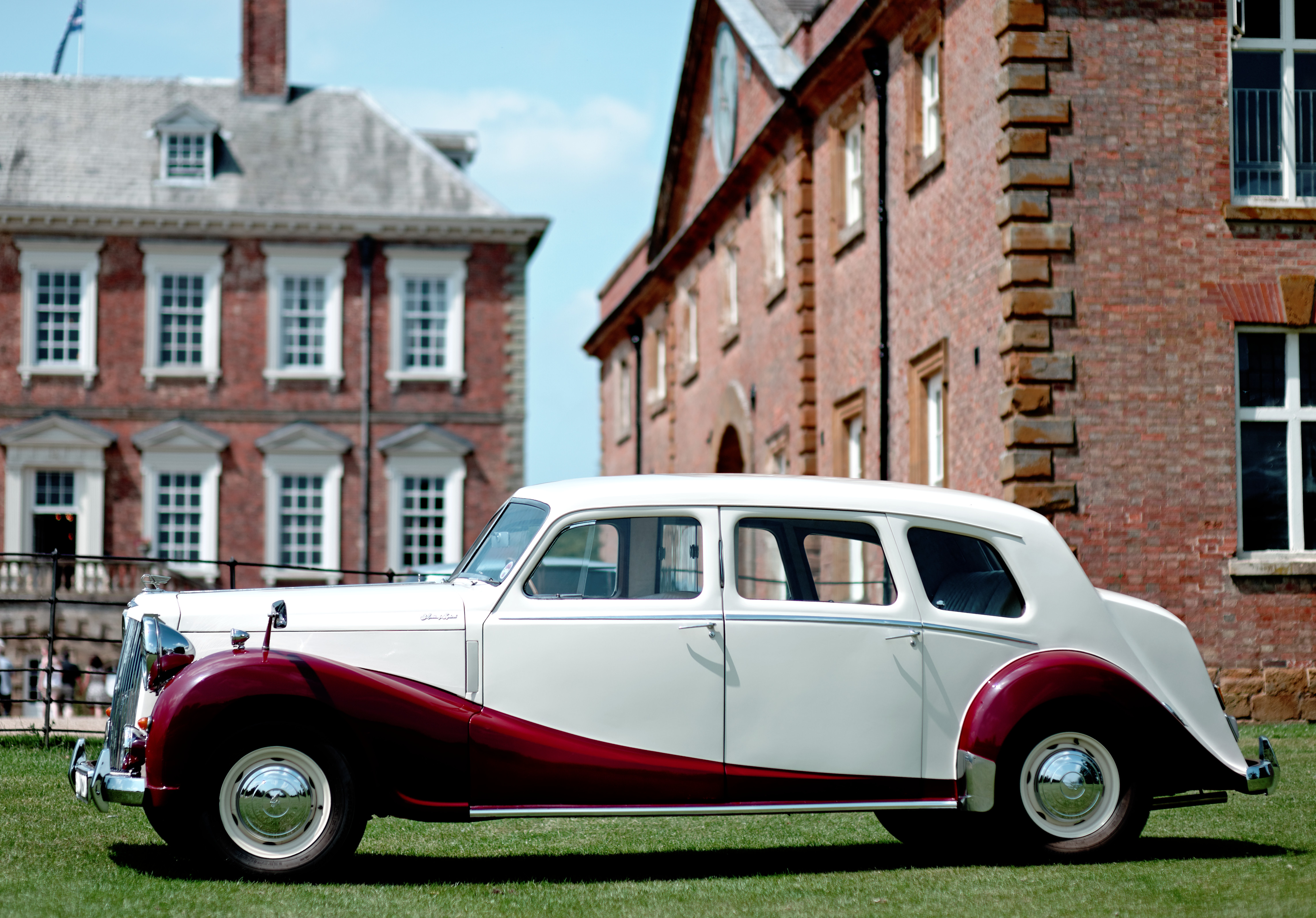
A125 Sheerline long-wheelbase limousine

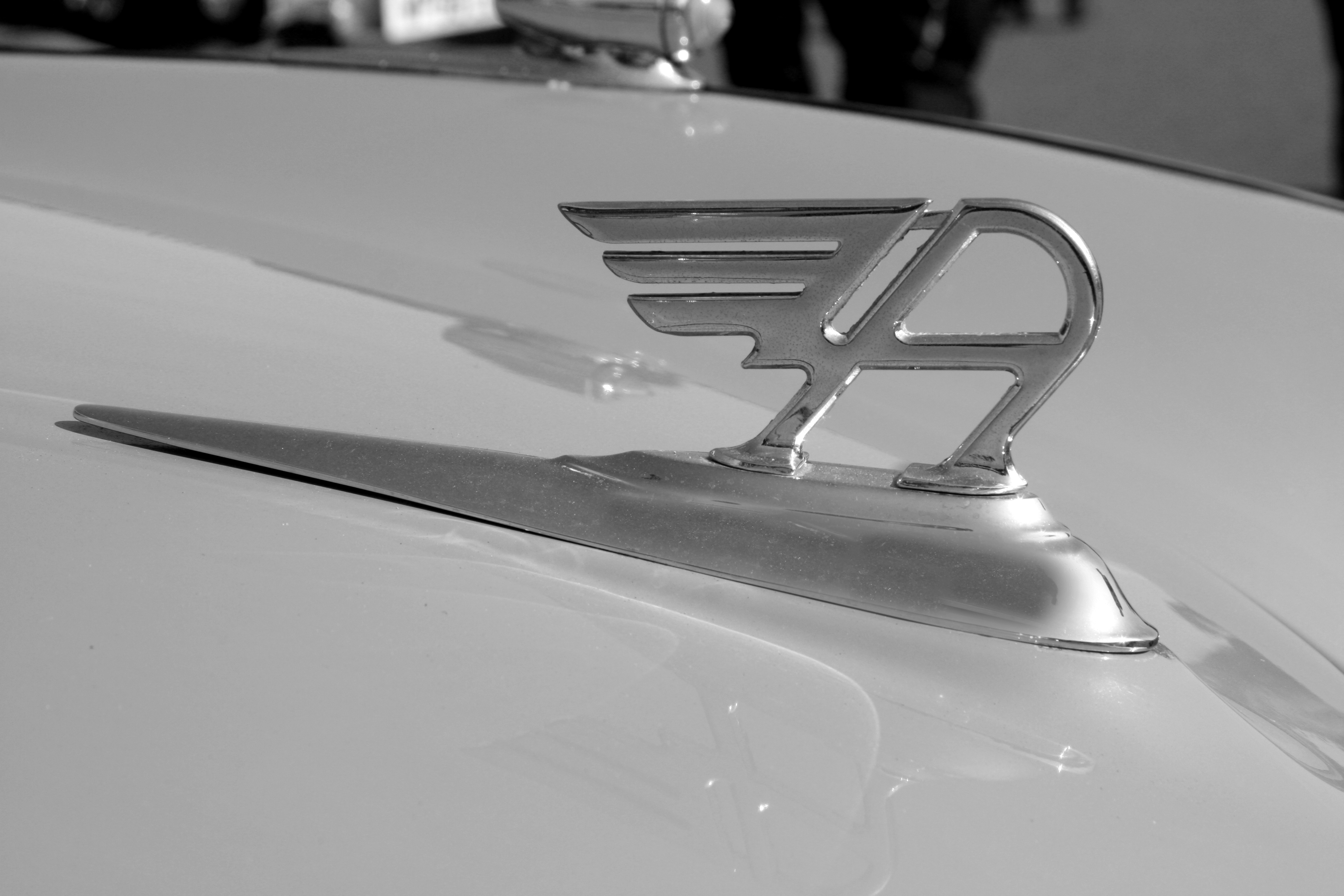
"Flying A" motif on an A35

One day, Lord handed the "Flying B" bonnet mascot from his Bentley to Burzi, to create something similar. Burzi altered the slope of the "B" and formed a stylised "A", attached a skeletal wing to the trailing edge, and wrapped it in foil. This "Flying A" became Austin's logo, and featured on the bonnet of many models until the late 1960s, beginning with the Austin Sheerline in 1947. On some models, it doubled as the bonnet release, operated by tilting it forwards.
