= Austin A90 =

Austin A90 may refer to:

- Austin A90 Atlantic
- Austin Westminster
