= Austin A40 =

Car model

A number of different motor vehicles were marketed under the Austin A40 name by Austin between 1947 and 1967.

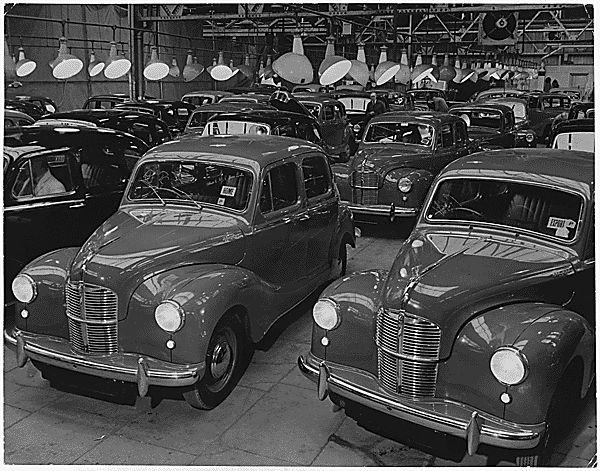
2-door Austin A40 Dorsets and 4-door Austin A40 Devons for the home and export markets, from about 1947 until 1952

Austin's naming scheme at that time derived from the approximate engine output, in horsepower. To distinguish between the different models, they were also named after counties of England.

The following vehicles were sold under the Austin A40 name:

- 1947–50 Austin A40 Dorset 2-door saloon
- 1947–52 Austin A40 Devon 4-door saloon
- 1947–56 Austin A40 Countryman 2-door estate car
- 1947–56 Austin A40 Van 2-door panel van
- 1947–56 Austin A40 Pick-up 2-door pick-up truck
- 1948–5? Austin A40 Tourer 2-door, four passenger tourer built in Australia
- 19??–19?? Austin A40 Coupe Utility 2-door coupe utility, produced in Australia
- 1950–53 Austin A40 Sports 2-door, four passenger convertible with twin-carburettors and aluminium bodyshell
- 1952–54 Austin A40 Somerset 4-door saloon and 2-door convertible
- 1954–56 Austin A40 Cambridge 4-door saloon
- 1958–67 Austin A40 Farina 2-door saloon and 2-door hatchback
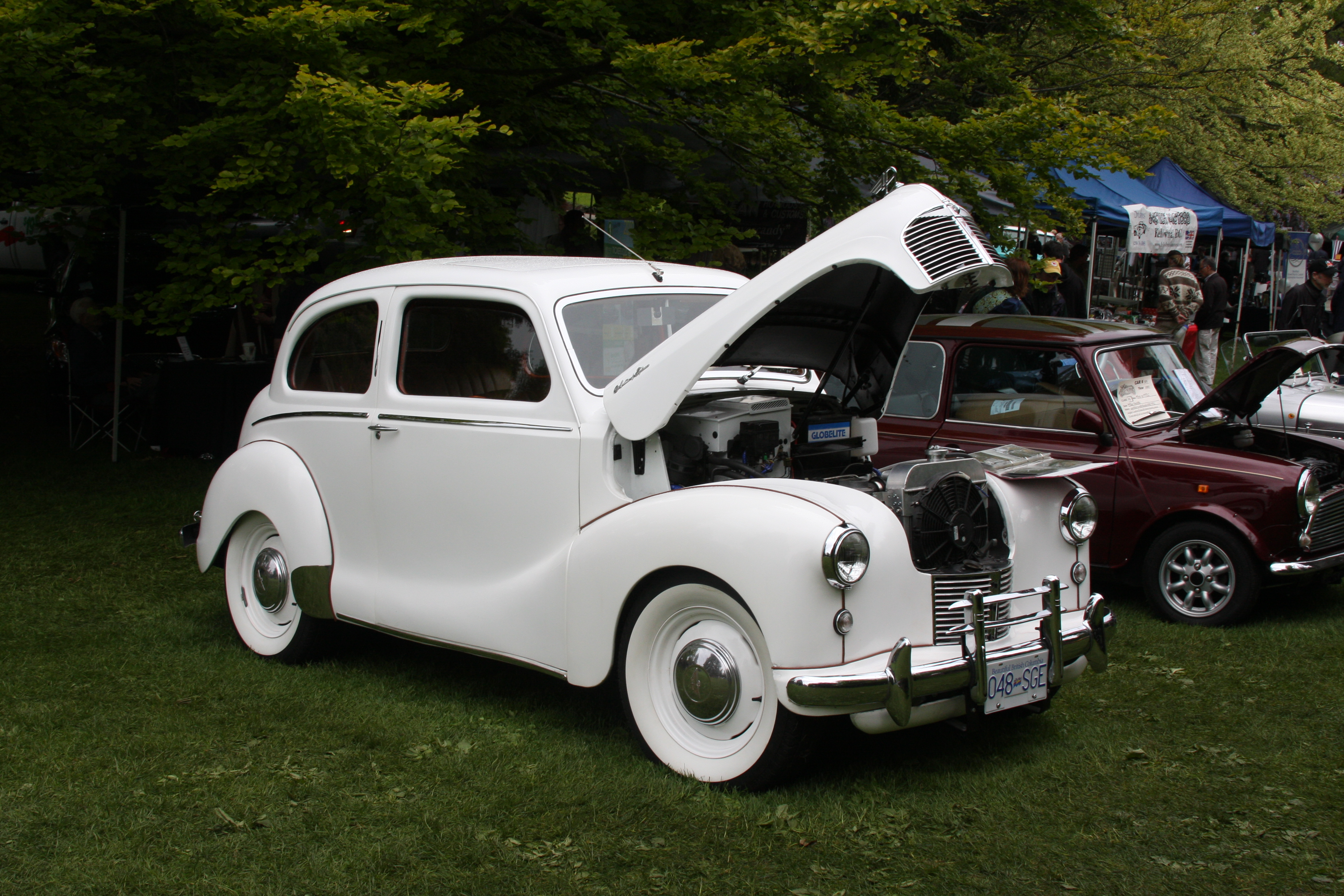
Austin A40 Dorset

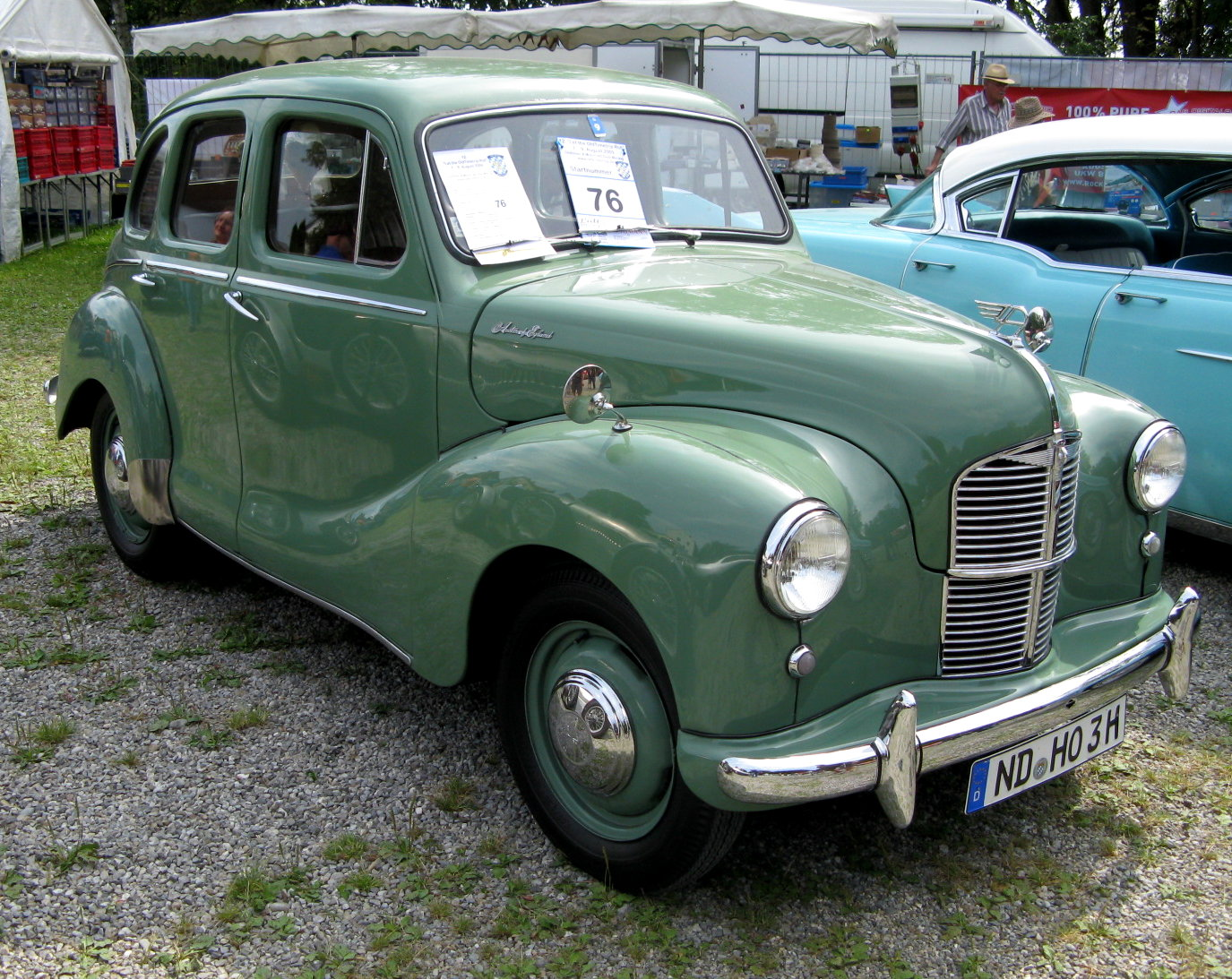
Austin A40 Devon

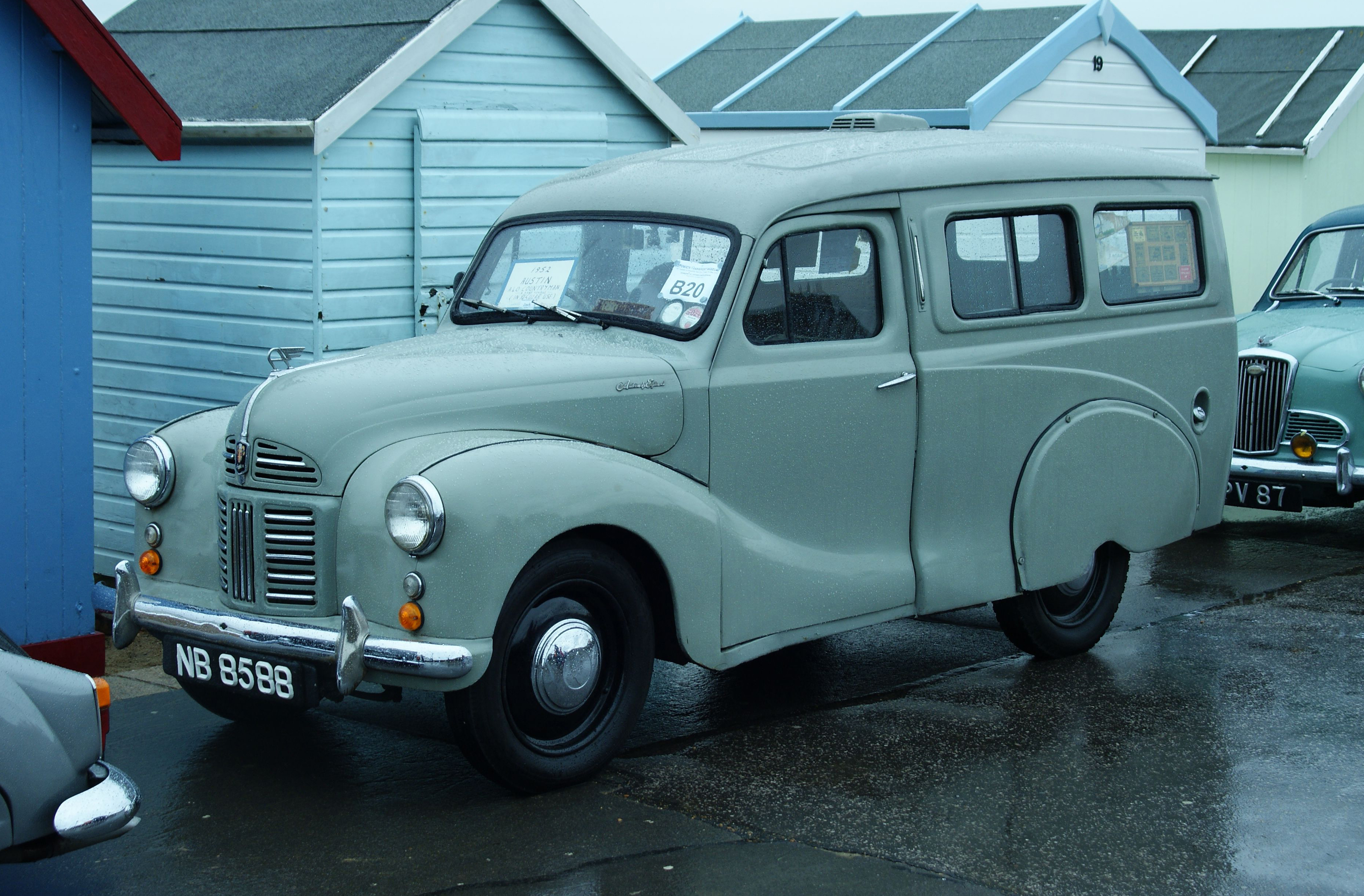
Austin A40 Countryman

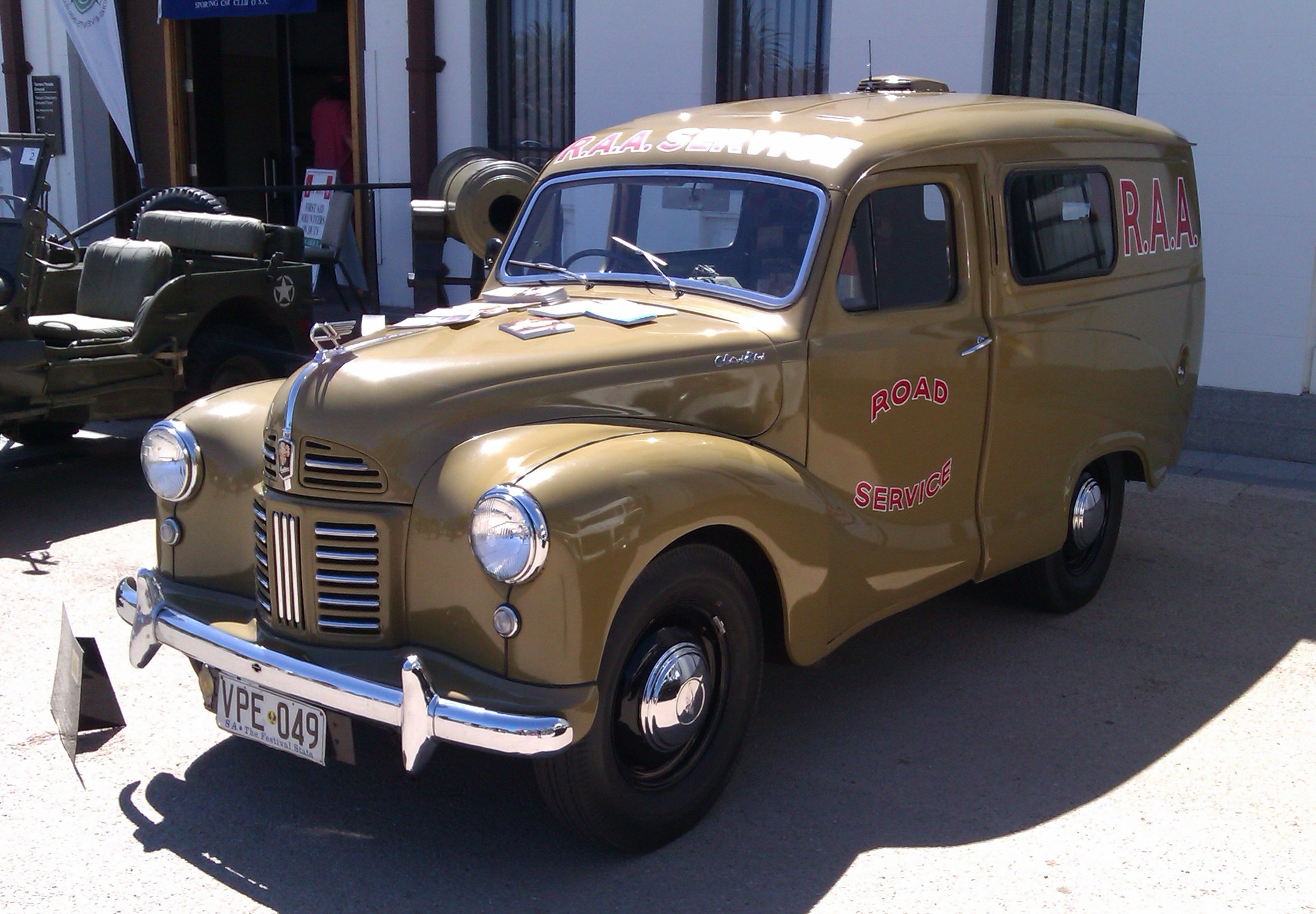
Austin A40 Van

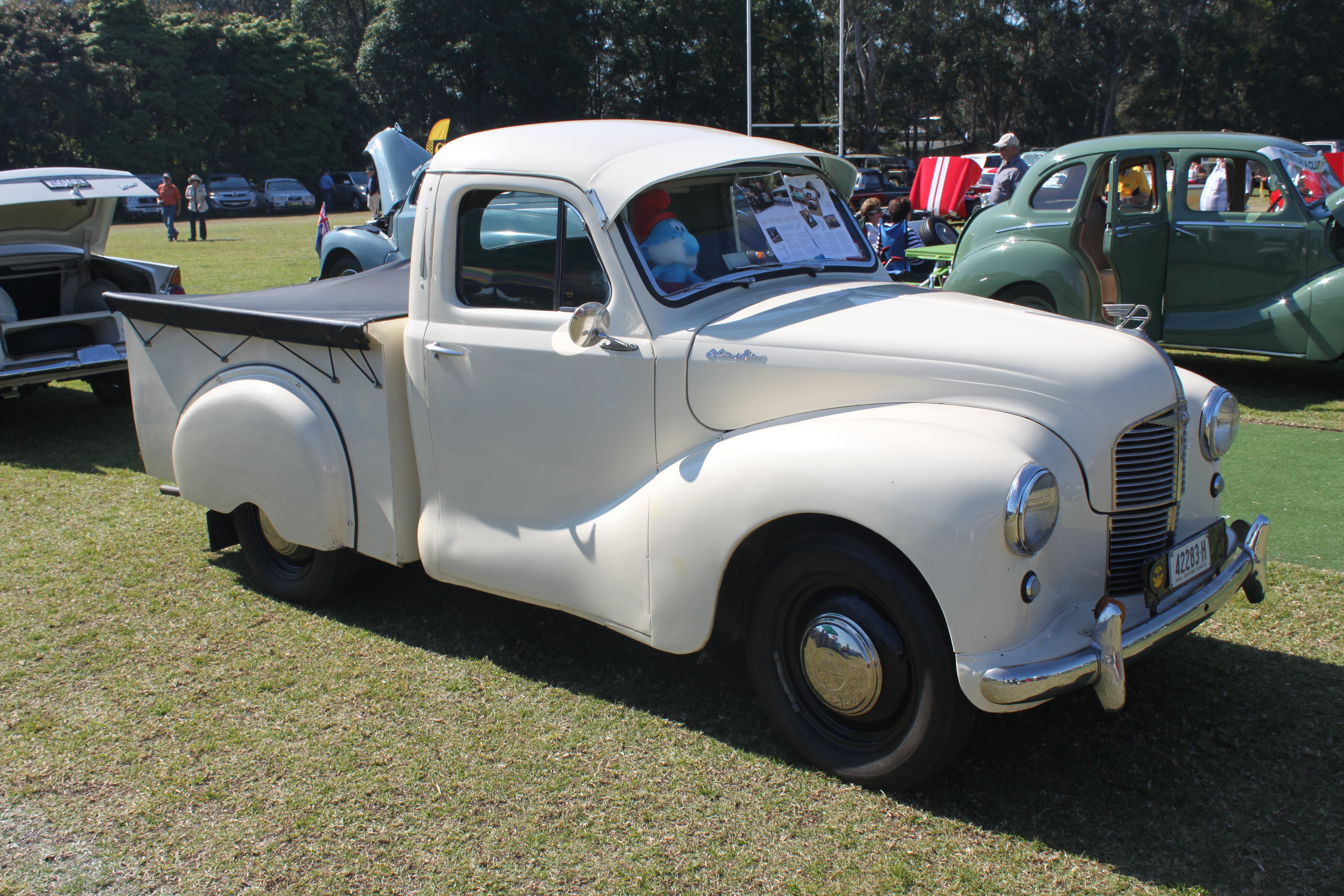
Austin A40 Pick-up

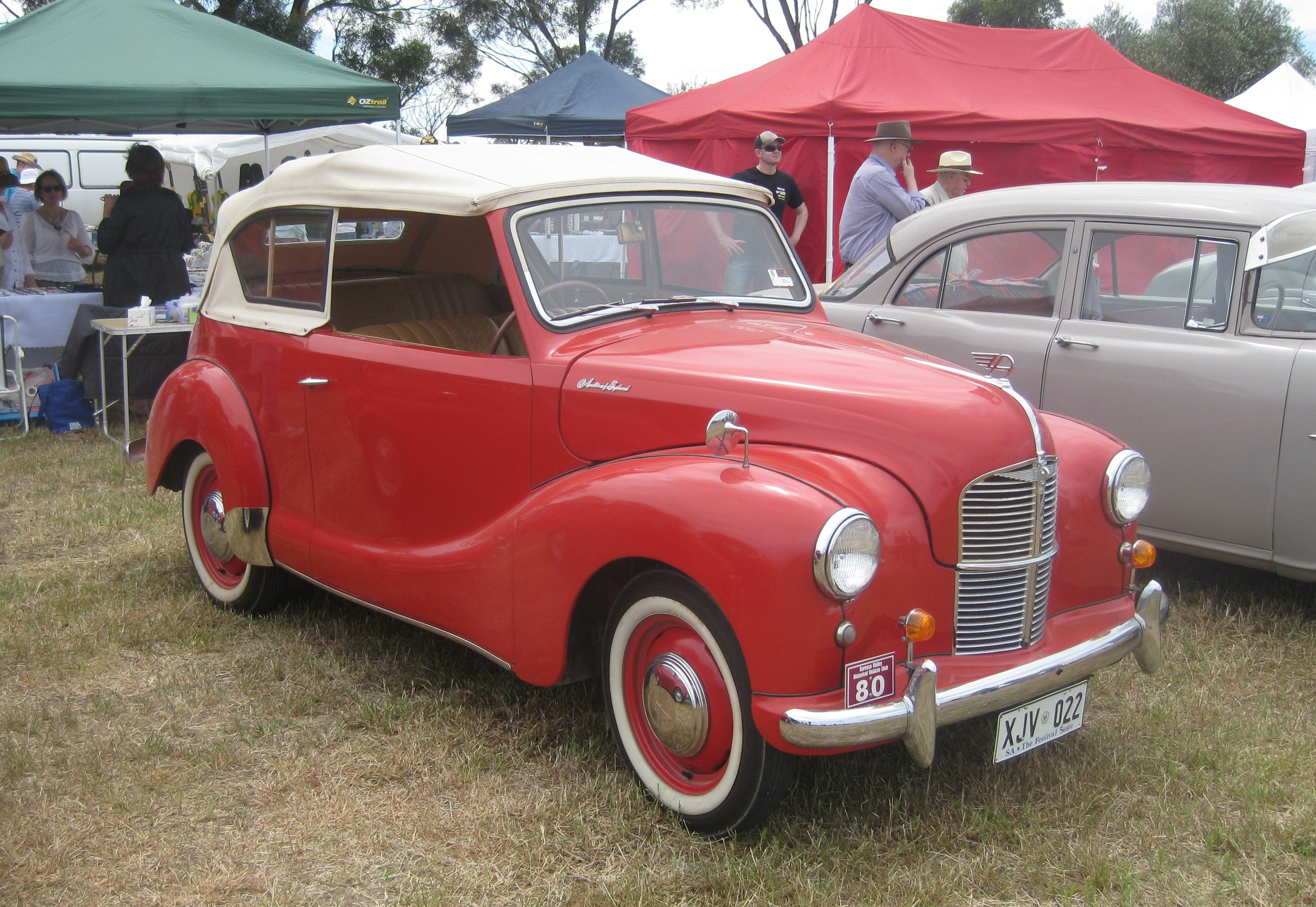
Austin A40 Tourer

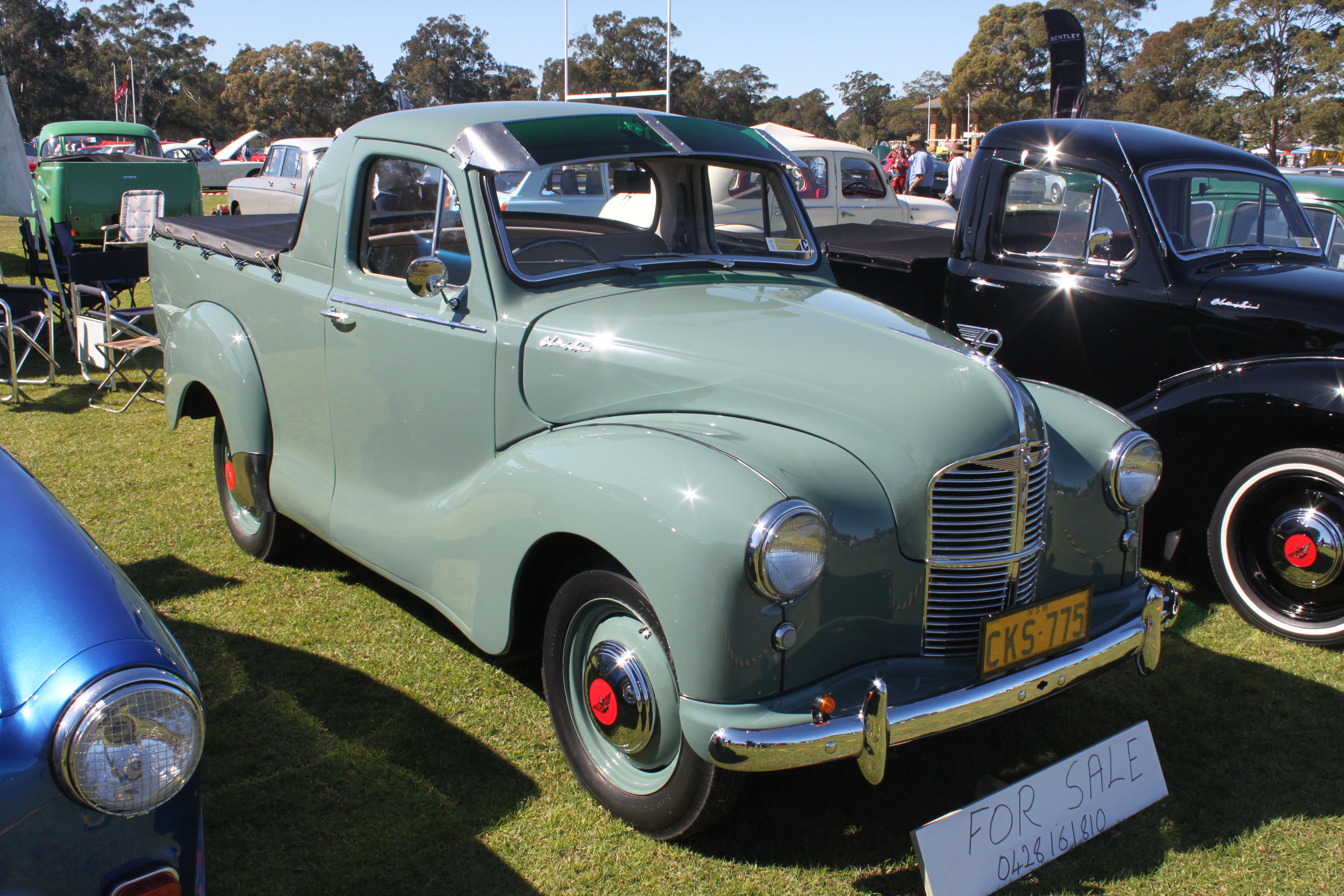
1953 Austin A40 Coupe Utility

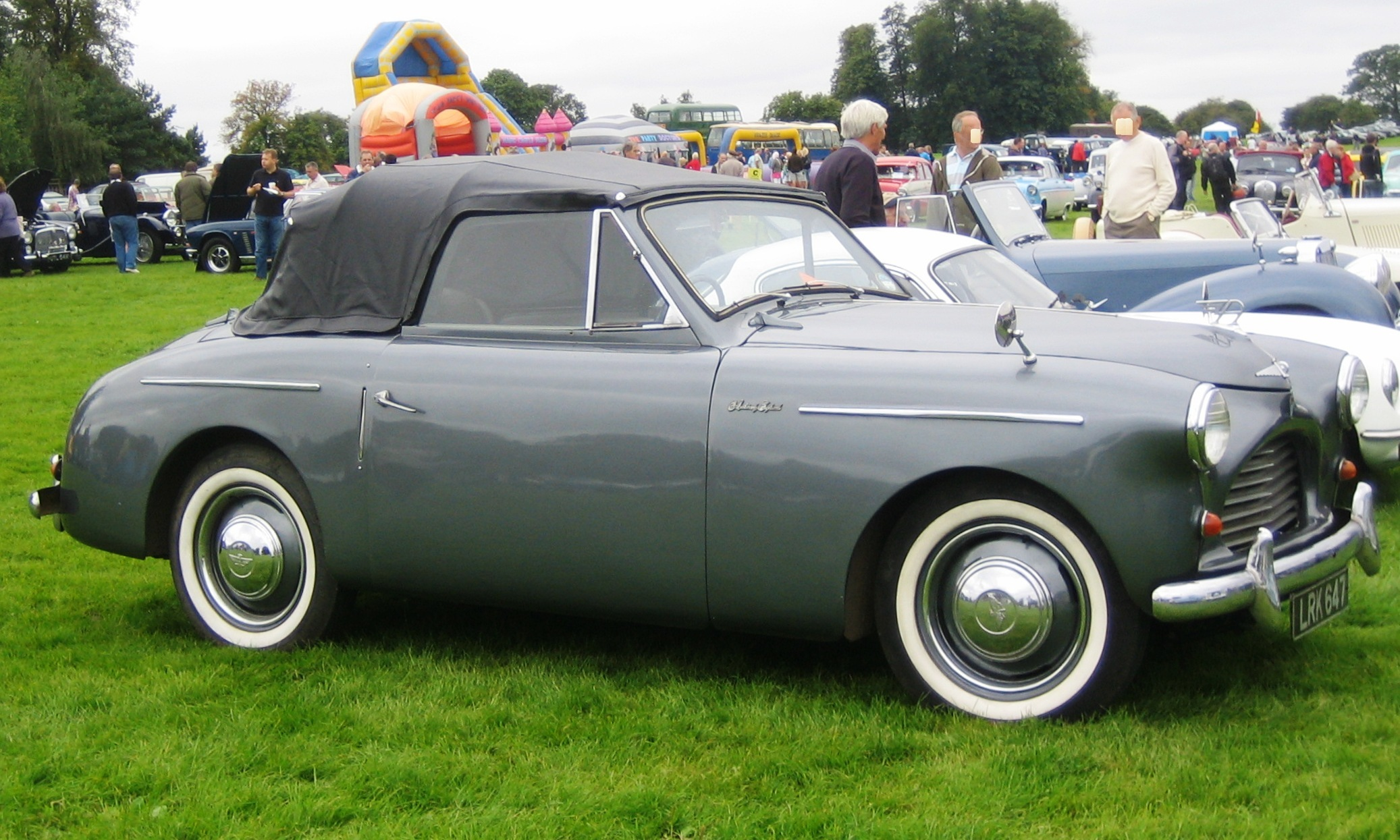
Austin A40 Sports

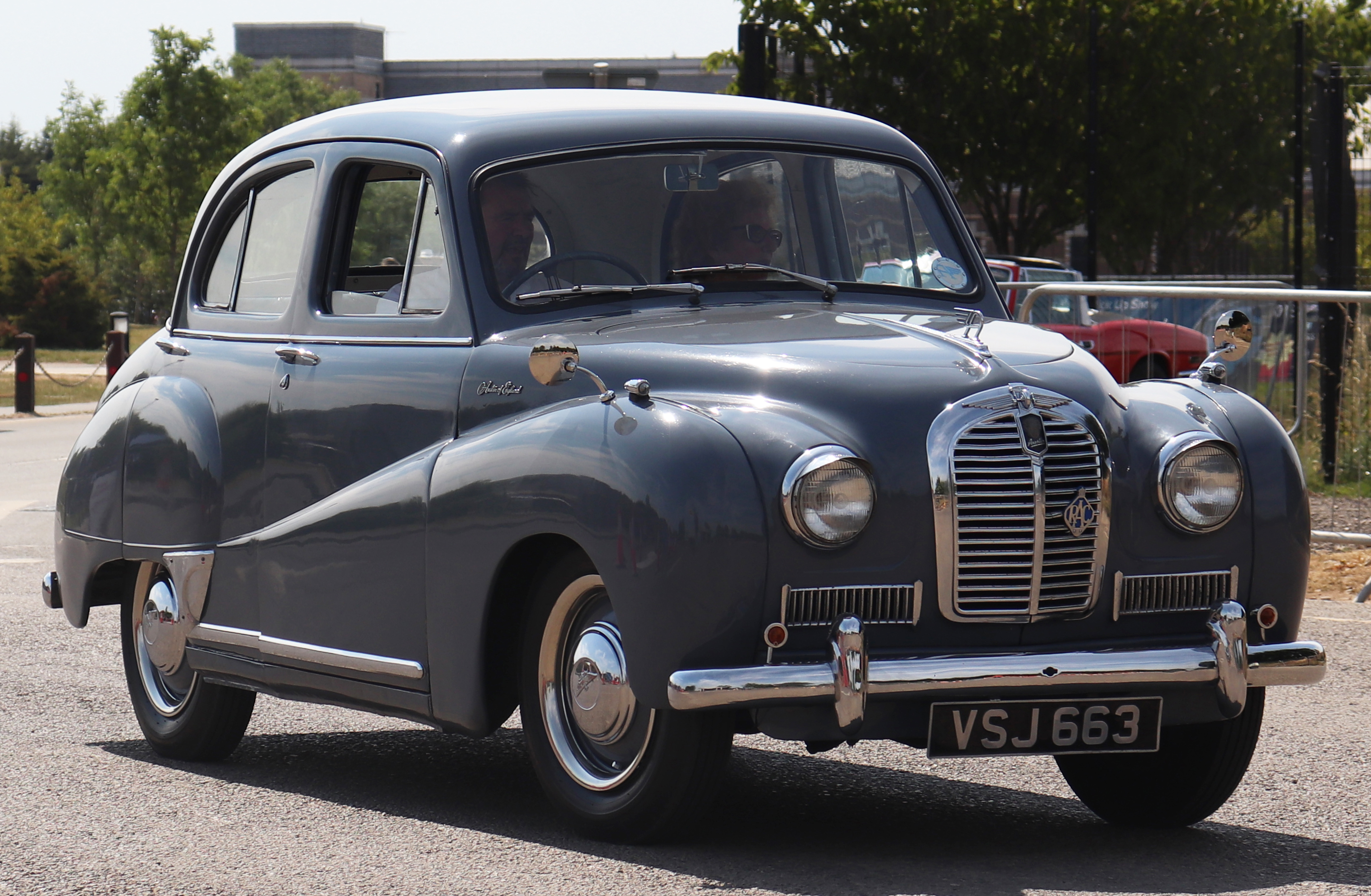
Austin A40 Somerset

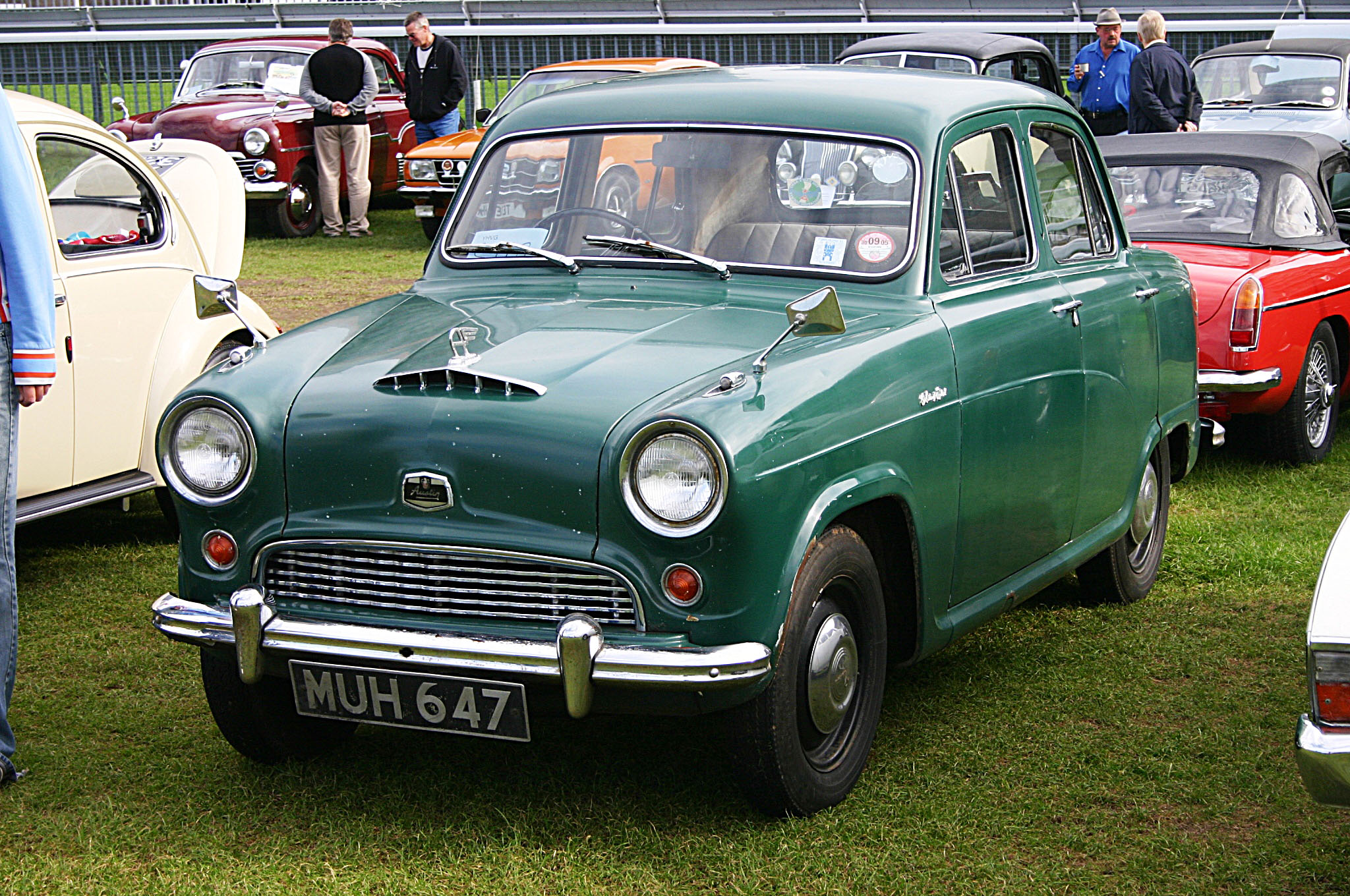
Austin A40 Cambridge

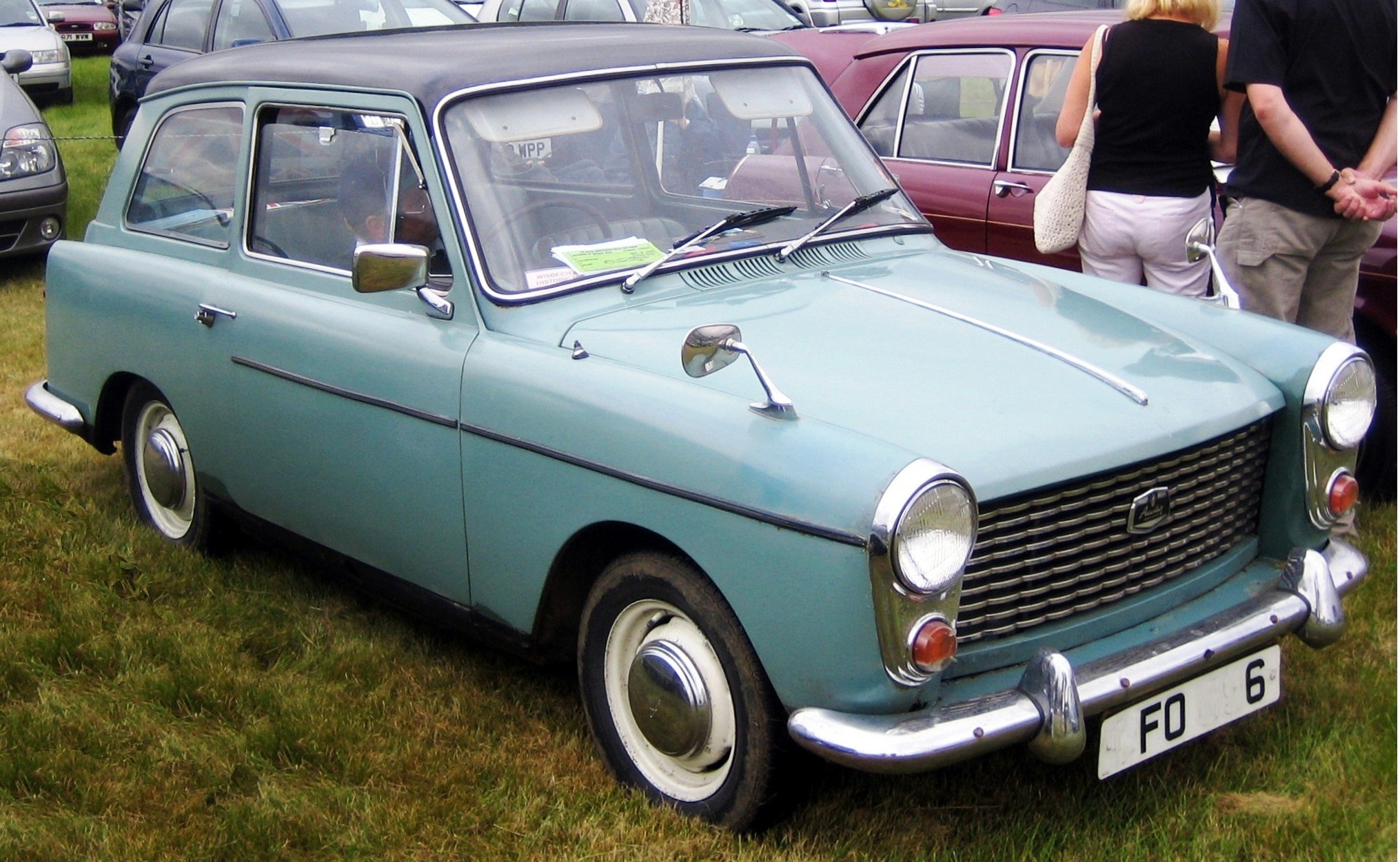
Austin A40 Farina Mk I
