= Austin A90 Atlantic =

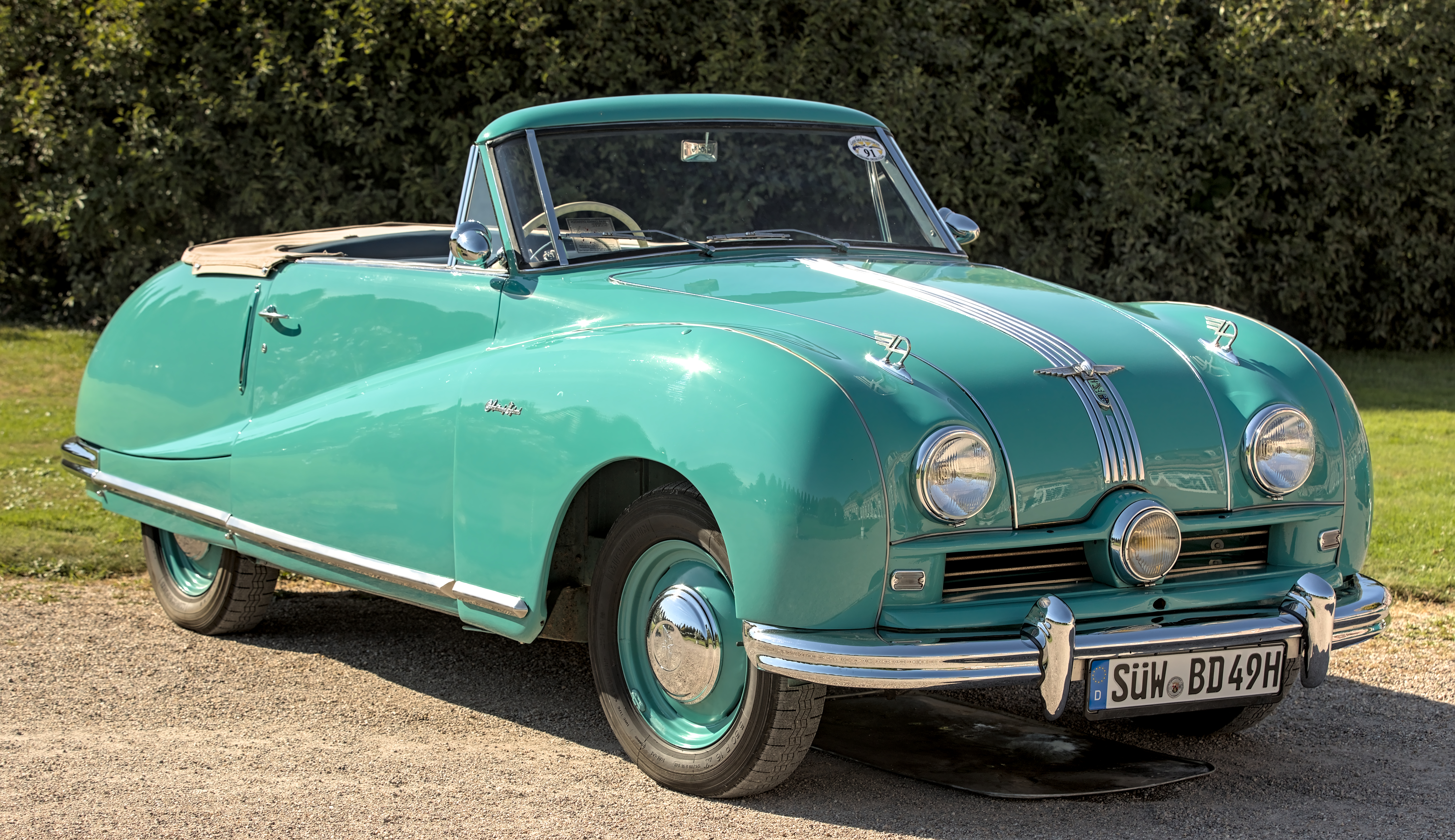
- Austin A90 Atlantic convertible

Overview
- Manufacturer: Austin
- Production: 1949–1952
- Assembly: United Kingdom: Longbridge, Birmingham (Longbridge plant)

Body and chassis
- Body style: 2-door coupé 2-door convertible
- Layout: FR layout

Powertrain
- Engine: 2660 cc I4
- Transmission: 4-speed column-shift manual

Dimensions
- Wheelbase: 96 in (2,438 mm)
- Length: 177 in (4,496 mm)
- Width: 70 in (1,778 mm)
- Height: 60 in (1,524 mm)

The Austin A90 Atlantic is a British car produced by the Austin Motor Company from 1949 until 1952. It was launched initially as a four-seat convertible, making its début at the 1948 Earls Court Motor Show in London, with production models built between early 1949 and late 1950. A two-door coupé, marketed as the A90 Atlantic Sports Saloon, followed a year later. It had been previewed at the 1949 Motor Show and was in production at Longbridge between 1950 and 1952.

== Development ==
The Atlantic was one of the first post-war cars engineered from scratch by Austin, and was said to be styled from a thumbnail sketch by Leonard Lord, chairman of Austin and later the British Motor Corporation (BMC) — though the styling was more likely the work of resident Argentine Austin stylist Dick Burzi. The car was almost certainly influenced by a 1946 Pininfarina-bodied Alfa Romeo cabriolet, which just happened to end up at the Longbridge factory in mid-1947, a few months before the light blue 16 hp sports prototype made its first appearance in the experimental department and on nearby roads around the factory.

A coachbuilt 1950 Austin A90 Atlantic Estate was produced by E.D. Abbott Ltd for the manager of the Frensham Estate in Farnham, UK. This estate was modified from a 1950 Austin A90 Atlantic DHC and designed by Abbott of Farnham designer Peter Woodgate. The wooden coachwork was so complex that the foreman of the workshop did all the woodwork by himself. The car had a lifting rear door and sported unusual curved perspex roof panels. Regularly seen in the 1950s used by a convent in Leith, Scotland. This car has not been seen or heard of in over 40 years.

With the government edict of "export or die", and steel allocated only to those who generated much needed revenue, the Atlantic was designed specifically to appeal to North American tastes. The car featured up-to-the-minute detailing, with a wrap-around windscreen, composed of a flat glass centre section with tiny curved end panels. The front wings (fenders) sported twin "flying A" hood ornaments and swept down to a rounded tail, with spats enclosing the rear wheels. A centrally mounted 'third headlight', actually a foglamp was built into the letter-box style air intake grille, and the then unheard of luxury of hydraulically powered windows and hood (convertible top), "flashing indicators" (blinkers) rather than trafficators, (for the United States market at least) and the option of EKCO or HMV Autocrat radios.

The range-topping Austin was offered in a variety of "jewelescent" colours with names like "seafoam green" and "desert gold", but few of these new metallics were sold in the UK market. (According to John Cleaver, an apprentice at Ricardo Burzi's design department, Burzi wanted him to make plaster casts from an oval clay plaque of an Austin A90 he made during the prototype stage. Burzi wanted half a dozen castings made so he could paint them in different colours.)

The convertible, a three-window, drophead coupe, had a simple fabric top, without rear quarter lights (opera windows), which butted up to the rear of a rather thick windscreen header rail. The fixed head, five window, sports saloon (hardtop), could be had with its roof painted or covered in fabric. This gave it the popular "drophead", or "cabriolet", look; all the style with no leaks. As its final trick, the centre section of the three-piece, wrap-around, rear window could be lowered into the boot (trunk), for added ventilation by a remote winder above the front windscreen.

Few people in the car's native Britain would have ever seen anything like the futuristically styled Atlantic before, and certainly not from a conservative mainstream manufacturer like Austin. The radical Atlantic suffered, however, from the dramatically new Jaguar XK120, also launched at the 1948 Motor Show.

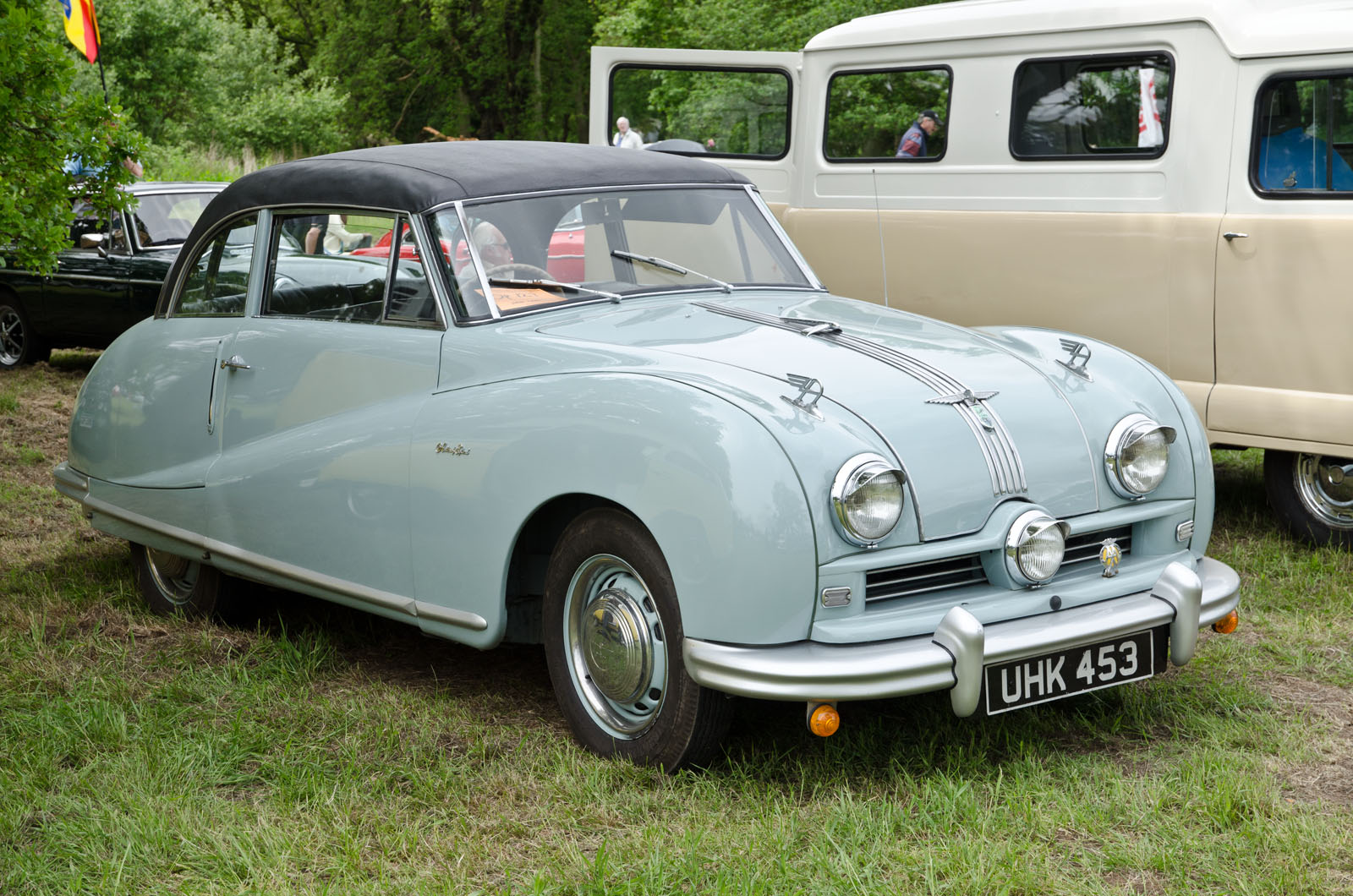
1952 Austin A90 Atlantic Sports Saloon

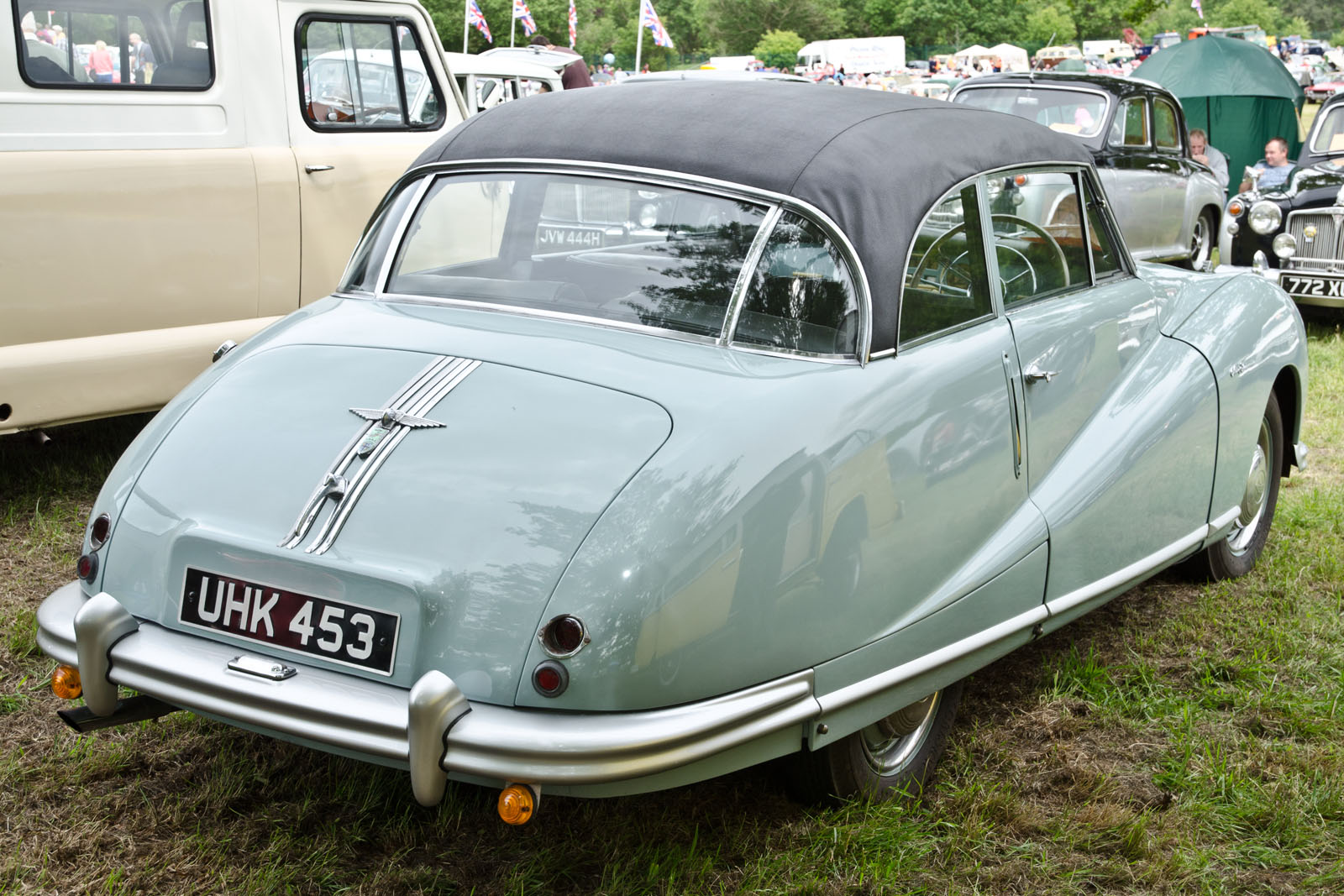
1952 Austin A90 Atlantic Sports Saloon (rear view)

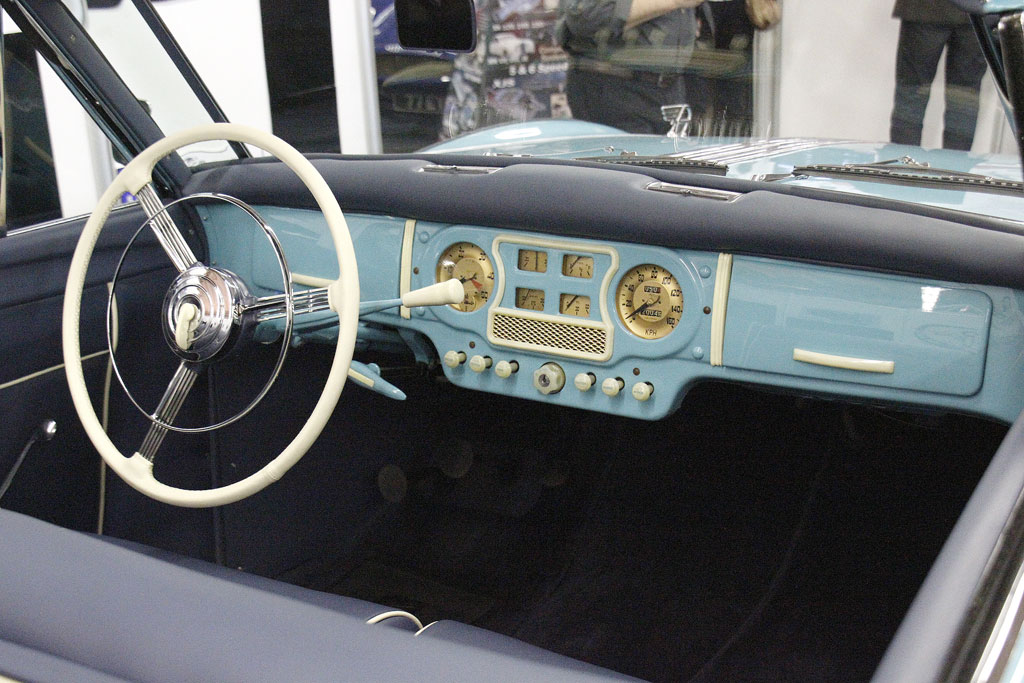
Interior (convertible)

== Exports ==
Out of a total production run of 7,981, 3,597 were exported, 350 of which were to the US. This low level of sales in the US was despite a huge focus by Austin, including a successful attempt at breaking 63 stock car records at the Indianapolis Motor Speedway in April 1949 by Alan Hess, Charles Goodacre and Dennis Buckley and a US$1000 price reduction in 1949. The four-cylinder 2.7-litre engine could not compare in power output to native V8 engines — although, for its time, performance was strong. A few A90 engines were also used in civilian versions of the Austin Champ.

The car did see more success in former British Colonies, Europe, Scandinavia and Australasia.

== Performance ==
The Atlantic was powered by an engine based on the proven Austin A70 OHV engine design, but increased to 2,660 cc (162 cu in). The large four-cylinder produced 88 bhp (66 kW) @ 4000rpm and later saw service in the Austin-Healey 100.

A convertible tested by the British magazine The Motor in 1948 had a top speed of 91 mph (146 km/h) and could accelerate from 0-60 mph (97 km/h) in 16.6 seconds. A fuel consumption of 21.7 miles per imperial gallon (13.0 L/100 km; 18.1 mpg_{‑US}) was recorded. The test car, which had the optional hydraulically powered top and window operation (£40 extra), cost £824, including taxes.

The handling was average, but adequate for the era, with coil independent suspension at the front and leaf springs at the rear, employing lever arm shock absorbers or 'dampers' which, when worn, resulted in a characteristic 'wave motion' over undulating surfaces. The underpinnings were somewhat less exotic than the all-enveloping bodywork: the chassis and running gear were based on that of the well-proven 1949 Austin A70 Hampshire saloon (not to be confused with the smaller entry level A40 Devon). Brakes were initially a mix of hydraulic (front) and mechanical (rear) with 11 in (279 mm) drums, replaced by a fully hydraulic brake setup from 1951 onwards on the hardtop coupe (saloon) with large diameter finned drums and vented wheels. This made for efficient anti-fade braking for the time, necessary to bring the 26 long cwt (1,321 kg) vehicle to rest.

== Longevity ==
The lack of factory rust proofing and styling that produced a multitude of mud traps led to rapid corrosion commonplace among many rushed post-war British designs. As a consequence of this and many Atlantics being broken up to provide spares for the Austin-Healey 100 very few examples survived into the 1970s, let alone the next century.
