= Austin A40 Somerset =

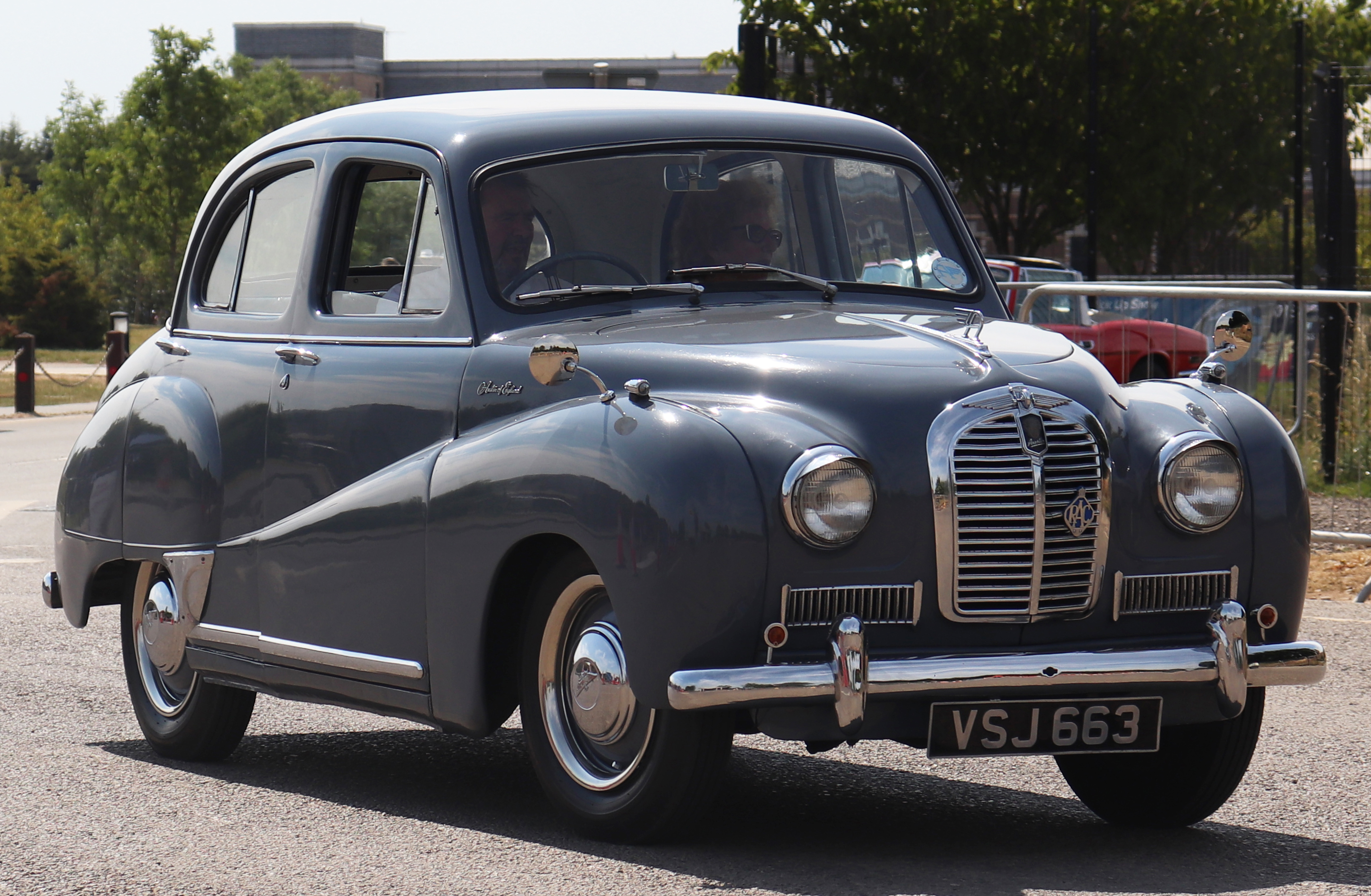
- Austin A40 Somerset Saloon

Overview
- Manufacturer: Austin (BMC)
- Also called: Nissan-Austin A40 Somerset (Japan)
- Production: 1952–1954
- Assembly: United Kingdom: Longbridge (Longbridge plant); Japan: Yokohama (Nissan); Australia: Melbourne

Body and chassis
- Class: Medium family car
- Body style: 4-door saloon; 2-door convertible
- Layout: Front engine with rear wheel drive

Powertrain
- Engine: 1.2 L B-Series I4
- Transmission: 4-speed manual - synchromesh on 2nd, 3rd and top

Dimensions
- Wheelbase: 92.5 in (2,350 mm)
- Length: 158.5 in (4,026 mm)
- Width: 63 in (1,600 mm)
- Height: 62.5 in (1,588 mm)
- Curb weight: 2,232 lb (1,012 kg)

Chronology
- Predecessor: Austin A40 Devon/Dorset
- Successor: Austin A40 Cambridge

See Austin A40 for other A40 models.

The Austin A40 Somerset is a motor car which was produced by the Austin Motor Company from 1952 until 1954. The Somerset replaced the Austin A40 Devon and, as a body-on-frame car, it was comparable in size to its predecessor. It shared a number of components with the Devon which included a similar 1.2 litre straight-4 pushrod engine. The Somerset's engine was uprated to produce 42 hp (31 kW), compared to the Devon's 40 hp (30 kW), giving the car a top speed of 70 mph (110 km/h).

== Engineering ==
The Somerset features an updated "Transatlantic" body style with flowing lines as distinct from the Devon's bulky looking body. Resembling the larger Austin A70 Hereford, its design was aimed at improving export sales, particularly to America. Initially offered as only a 4-door saloon, a 3-passenger 2-door convertible, of the same body style was introduced in late 1952. The convertible replaced the earlier Austin A40 Dorset.

The body of the convertible was made by Carbodies of Coventry and the model was marketed as the Austin A40 Somerset Coupé. This particular style was also known as a 'drophead' coupé in the United Kingdom. The convertible differed from the saloon in having separate front seats that folded forward to give access to the rear. An additional convertible, the Austin A40 Sports, was carried over from the earlier A40 Devon and Dorset range but was discontinued with the arrival of the Somerset Coupé.

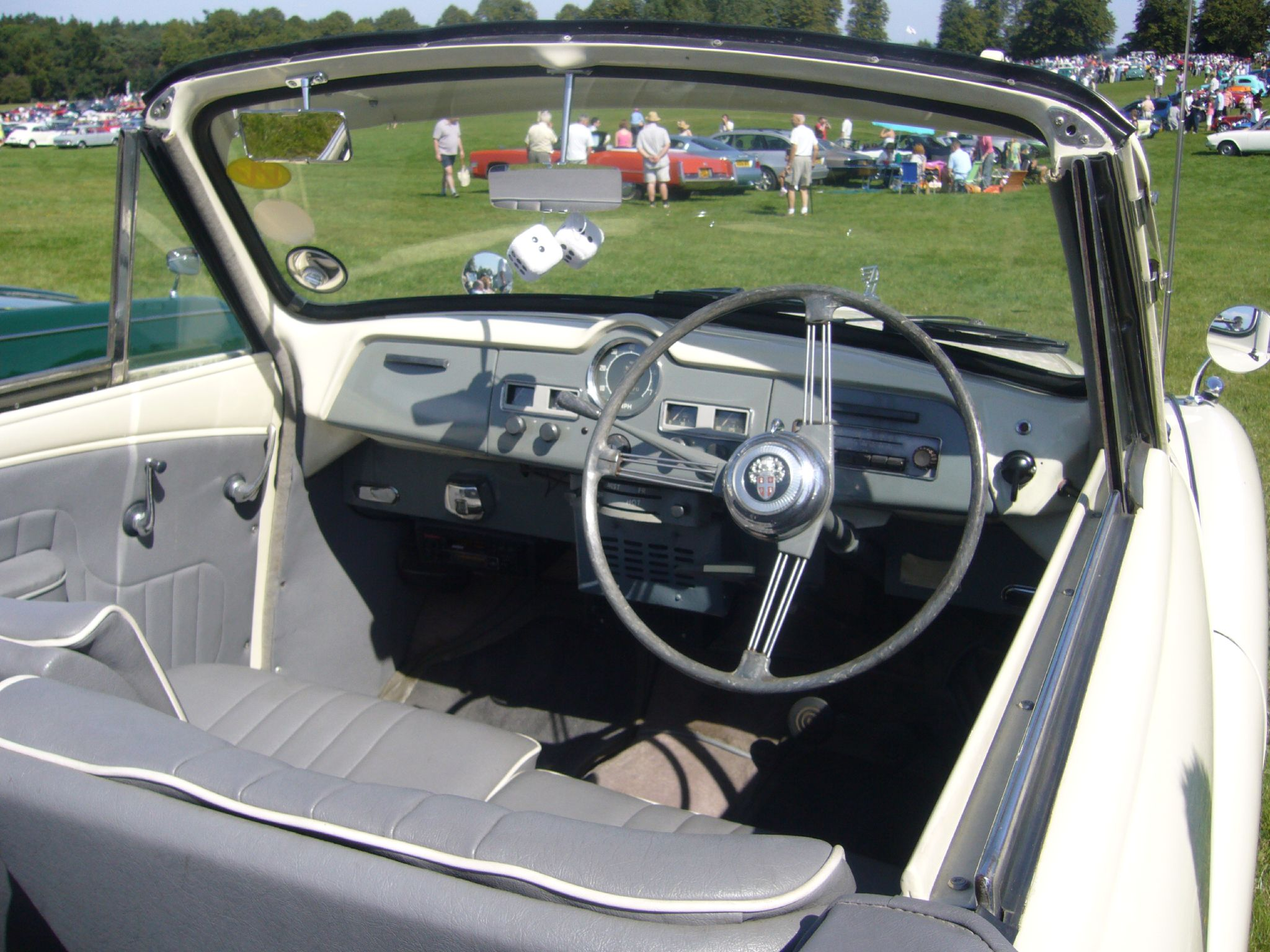
Interior (convertible)

In 1953 the Austin Motor Company produced a "special" version of around 500 Somerset saloons using the more powerful engine from the 'sports' model which incorporated twin SU carburettors in place of the single Zenith downdraught type. This vehicle featured different interior appointments and two-tone paintwork to set it aside from the standard offering. The Austin Somerset Special had a top speed of 74 mph (119 km/h) while the normal saloon could reach up to 70 mph (110 km/h).

The standard Somerset interior contained two close fitting front seats, finished in leather, which could be arranged as a bench seat and a large deeply cushioned rear bench seat which could accommodate three passengers. With a centrally mounted dashboard or instrument panel, Austin incorporated a four speed, plus reverse, gearbox into the car's design which was controlled by a column mounted gear change lever. Four-wheel, foot-operated hydraulic brakes, and a handbrake operating on the rear wheels only, provided the car's stopping power.

== Performance ==
A sports convertible version of the A40 tested by The Motor magazine in 1953 managed a top speed of 74 mph (119 km/h) and could accelerate from 0-60 mph (97 km/h) in 28.6 seconds. A fuel consumption of 30.1 miles per imperial gallon (9.4 L/100 km; 25.1 mpg_{‑US}) was recorded. These figures were all obtained on the contemporary low octane fuel. The test car cost £705 including taxes.

The Austin A40 Somerset saloon's reputation for being somewhat slow and lumbering to drive is not wholly deserved. It had to endure poor-quality petrol supplies in 1952, and in consequence had retarded ignition settings to tolerate the low octane rating of the fuels available to avoid the engine knocking or 'pinking' condition that was well known in those times. In fact, British Motor Corporation later produced a kit to improve the performance and fuel consumption of these cars once premium fuel supplies resumed under the popular petrol brands. This kit comprised a replacement distributor and an optional cylinder head gasket that was thinner and therefore raised the compression slightly from the standard 7.2:1.

An Autocar magazine road test published 18 April 1952 achieved a maximum of 66 mph (106 km/h) (mean) and 71 mph (114 km/h) (best), and a 0-60 mph acceleration of 36.6 seconds, whereas the example registered new in February 1954 and given a Used Car Test published in the Autocar series dated 8 April 1960 returned a 0-60 mph time of 27.9 seconds. The standing quarter mile was down from 24.4 secs to 23.2 secs, a marked improvement on the former result taken in 1952 and directly comparable with the Mini 850 launched in 1959, that was considered to be fairly brisk then.

== Production ==
Over 173,000 Somersets were sold before it was replaced by the A40 Cambridge in 1954. 7,243 were convertibles.

In December 1952 an agreement was signed with the Japanese automobile company Nissan to build Austin vehicles under licence using complete knock down kits (CKD) supplied from the UK. In April 1953 the first Japanese assembled Somersets rolled off the assembly line ready for sale on the local market to which it was restricted. Assembly ceased in November 1954 when the factory switched to the A50 Cambridge.

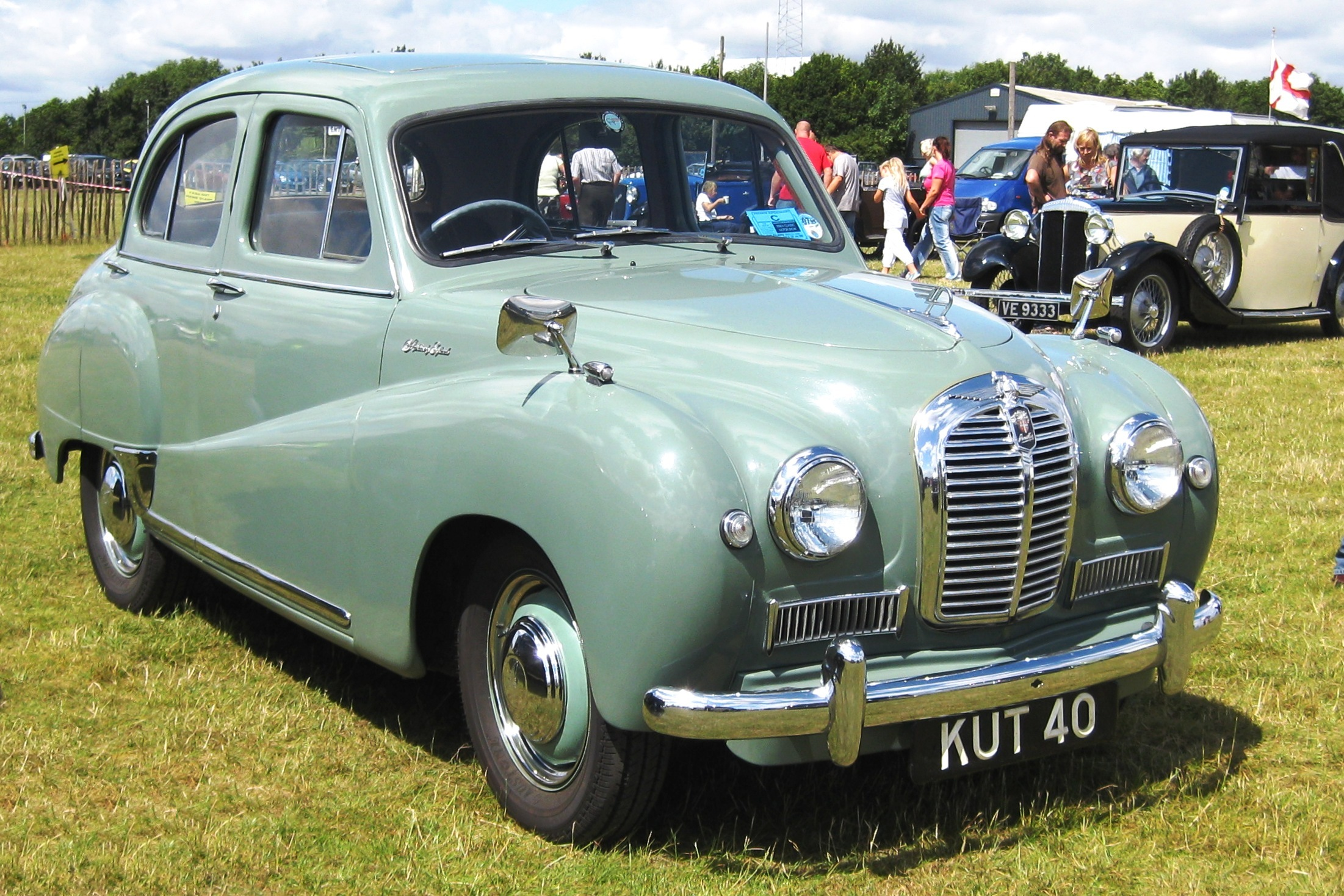
Austin A40 Somerset Saloon

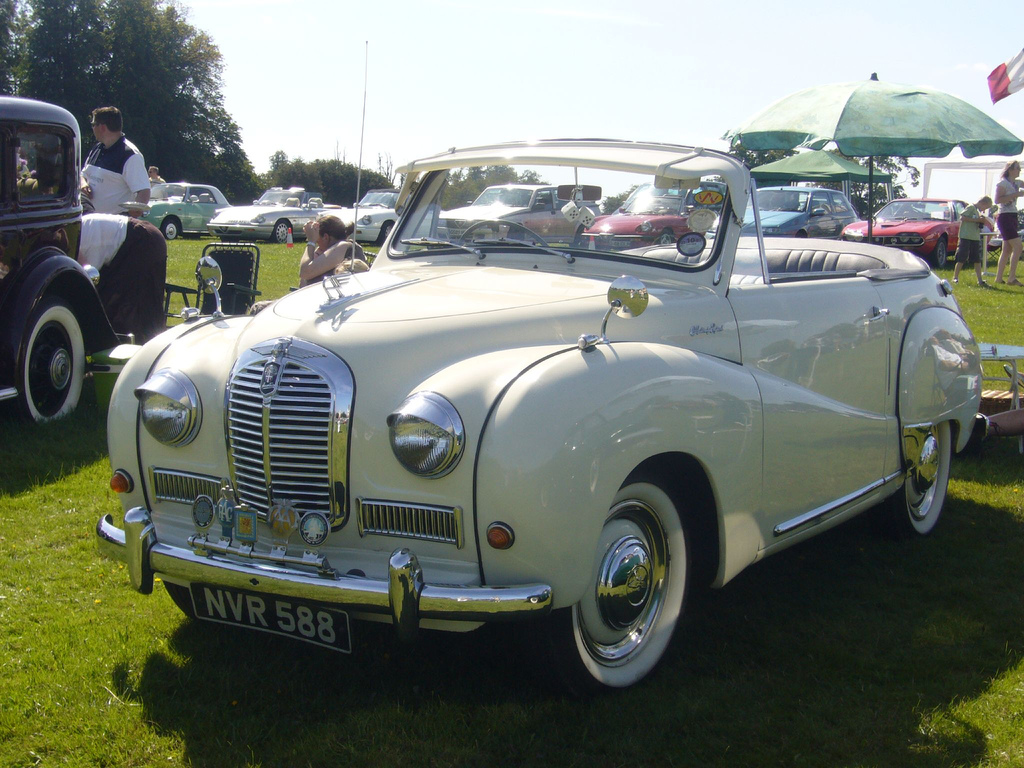
Austin A40 Somerset Coupé

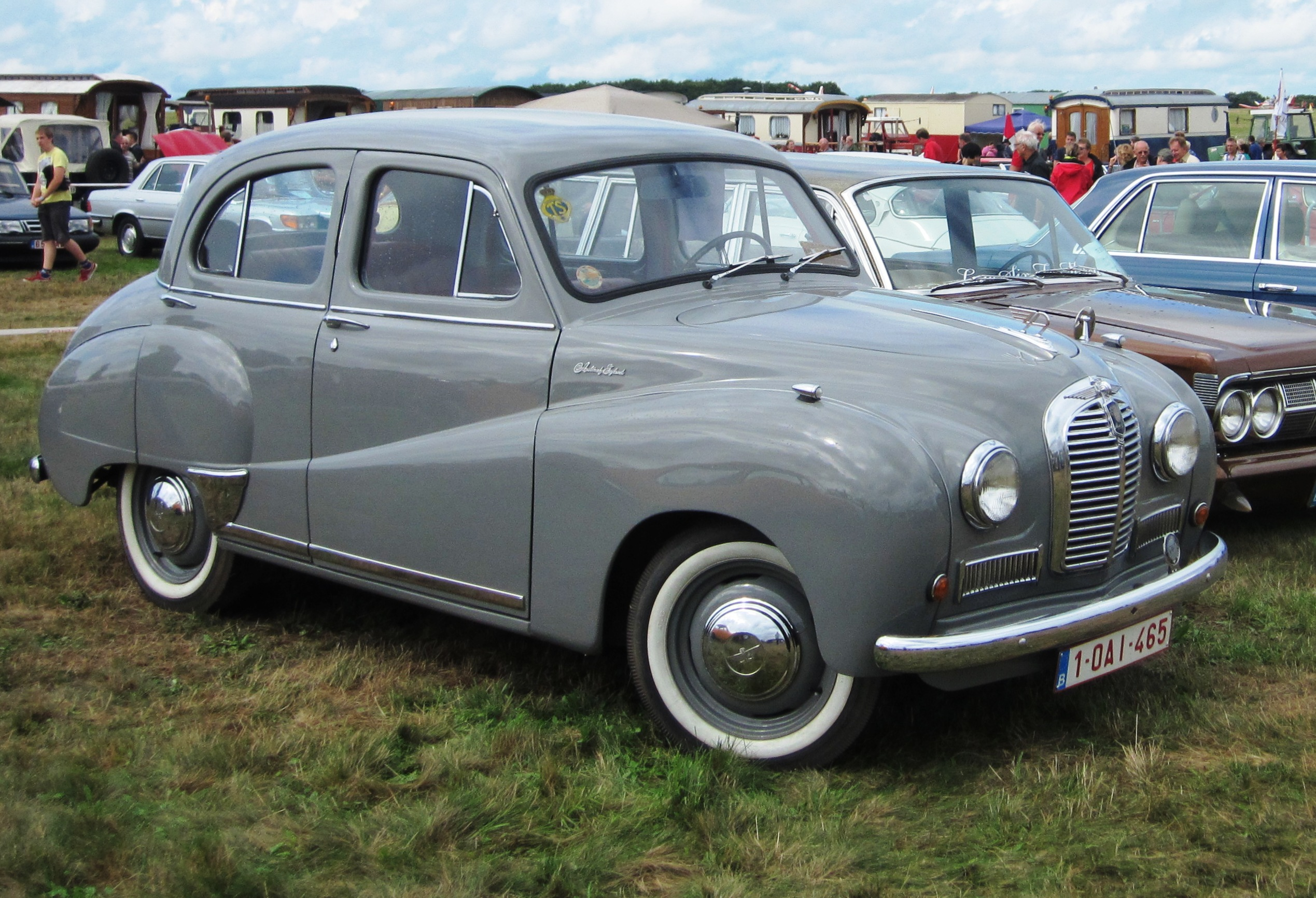
Austin A40 Somerset (ca 1953) at Schaffen-Diest 2013

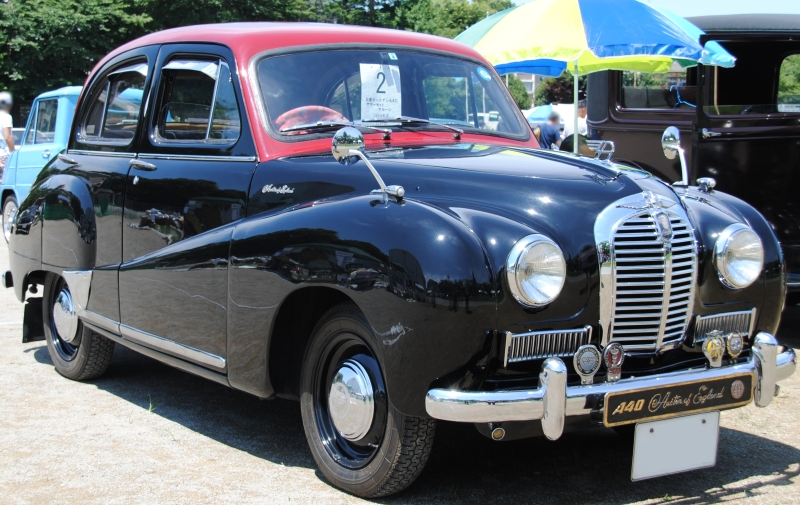
Nissan-Austin A40 Somerset (Japan)
