= Austin A40 Devon =

Austin A40 Devon Austin A40 Dorset
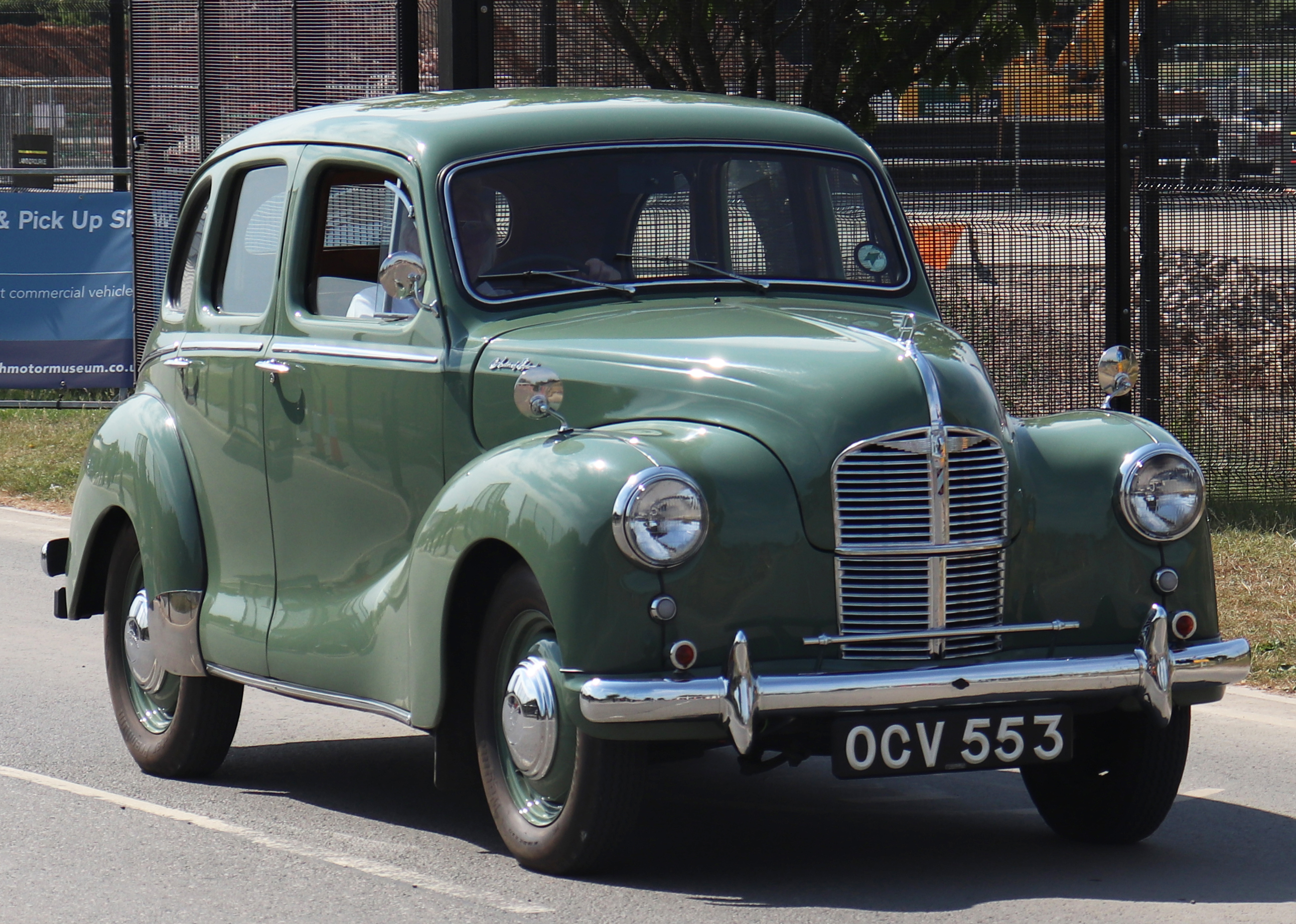
- Austin A40 Devon saloon

Overview
- Manufacturer: Austin (BMC)
- Production: 1947–1952
- Assembly: United Kingdom: Longbridge (Longbridge plant); Australia: Melbourne; New Zealand: Petone

Body and chassis
- Class: midsize car
- Body style: 2-door saloon 4-door saloon 2-door estate 2-door tourer (Australia); 2-door van 2-door pickup truck 2-door coupe utility (Australia)
- Related: Austin A40 Sports

Powertrain
- Engine: 1.2 L (1200 cc) Straight-4

Dimensions
- Wheelbase: 92.5 in (2,350 mm)
- Length: 153 in (3,886 mm)
- Width: 61 in (1,549 mm)
- Height: 63.5 in (1,613 mm)
- Curb weight: 2,130 lb (966 kg)

Chronology
- Predecessor: Austin 10
- Successor: Austin A40 Somerset

See Austin A40 for other A40 models and Austin A40 Sports for the sports car version of the Devon.

The Austin A40 Devon (and similar 2-door A40 Dorset) are automobiles that were marketed by Austin from 1947 to 1952 – the first post-war saloons to be produced by Austin – featuring a mix of old and new technologies. They were previewed by the UK press at the Paris Motor Show on 22 October 1947, who expressed immediate disappointment at the car's conservative appearance. More than 450,000 were built before the model's replacement in 1952 by the Austin A40 Somerset.

== Mechanicals and bodystyles ==
Both the Devon and Dorset were body-on-frame designs with modern bodies and a 1.2 L straight-4 OHV engine producing 40 bhp (30 kW) at 4200 rpm. They featured front coil sprung independent suspension but retained a rigid axle and semi-elliptic leaf springs at the rear. The Girling brakes with 9 in (229 mm) drums were operated hydraulically at the front and mechanically at the rear. Later cars had column operated gear change and full hydraulic braking. A sliding sunroof and heater were extra cost options on the UK market.

The Devon was the 4-door version and was more successful than the 2-door Dorset, which was dropped in 1949 after only 15,939 were made.

The "Countryman" estate was produced until late 1956. Equipped as a six-seater, its folding rear seat enabled it to be converted into a two-seater able to carry a half-ton load. A van and pickup truck were also produced.

The Devon was the first post-war-designed Austin to be assembled in New Zealand. It was produced from CKD kits at the Austin Distributors Federation assembly plant in Petone.

A prototype A40 Dorset Tourer was built at Longbridge in 1948. Although it was never put into production in England, various versions of the A40 Tourer were made in Australia beginning in September 1948.

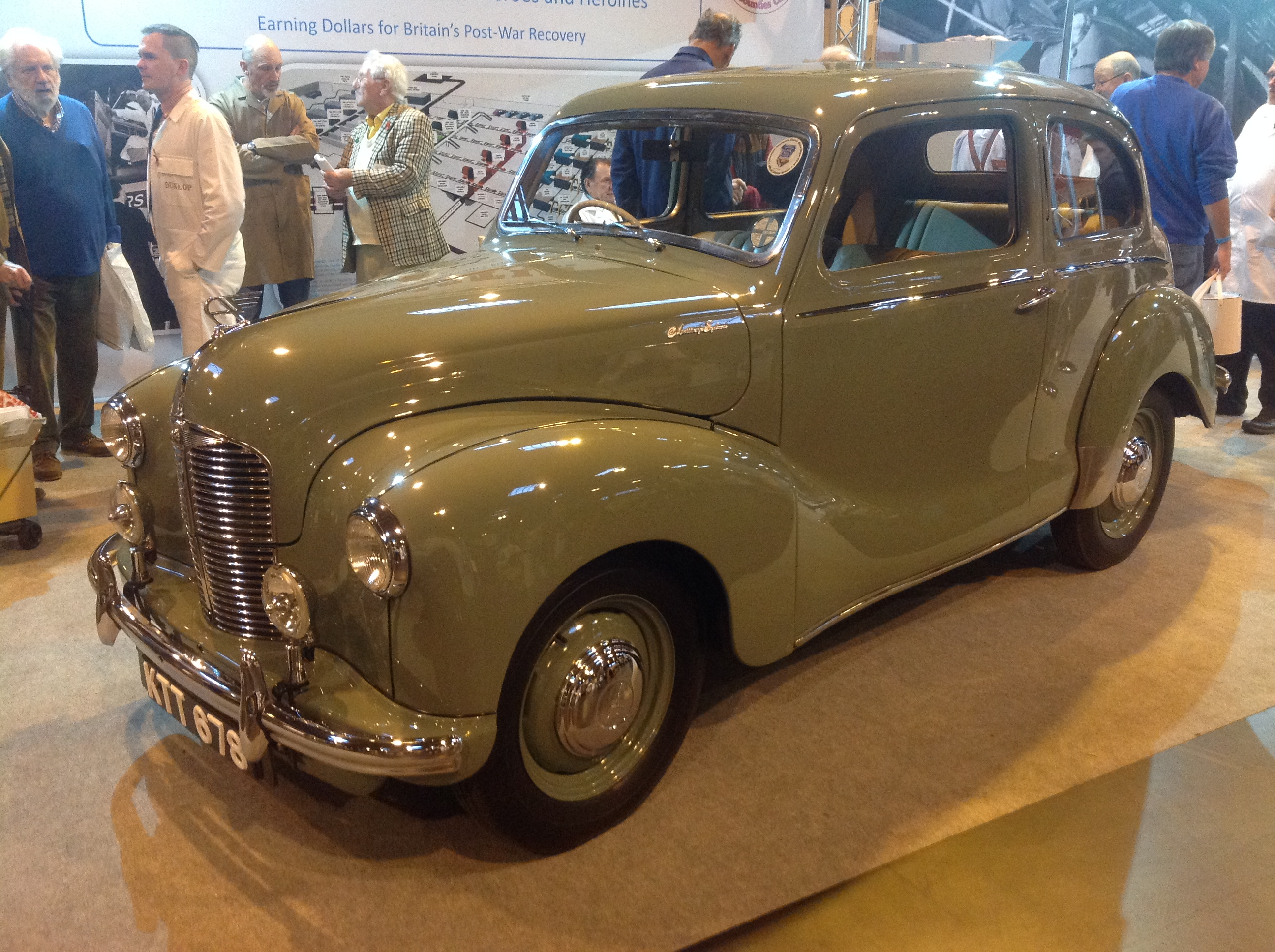
Austin A40 Dorset

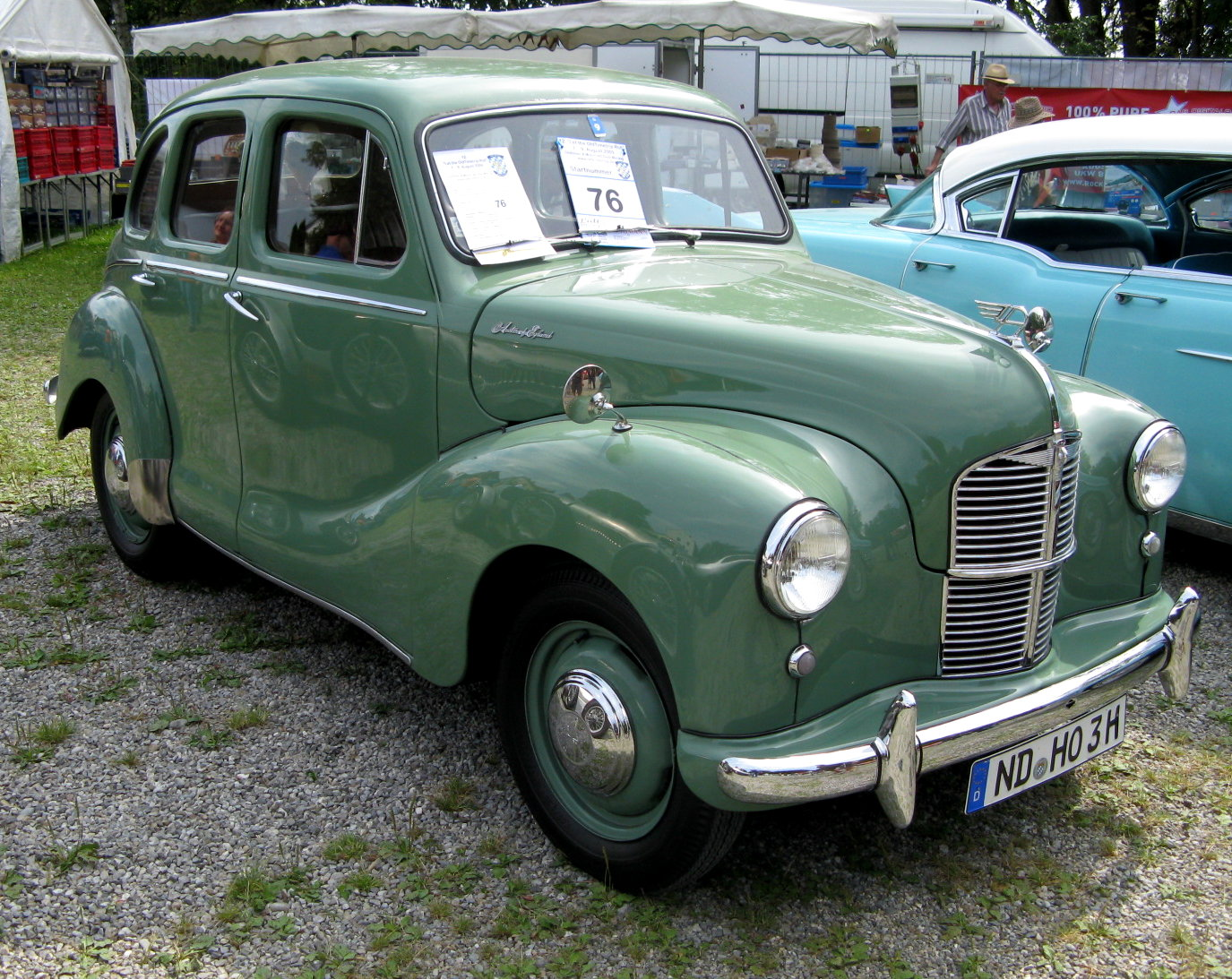
Austin A40 Devon Saloon

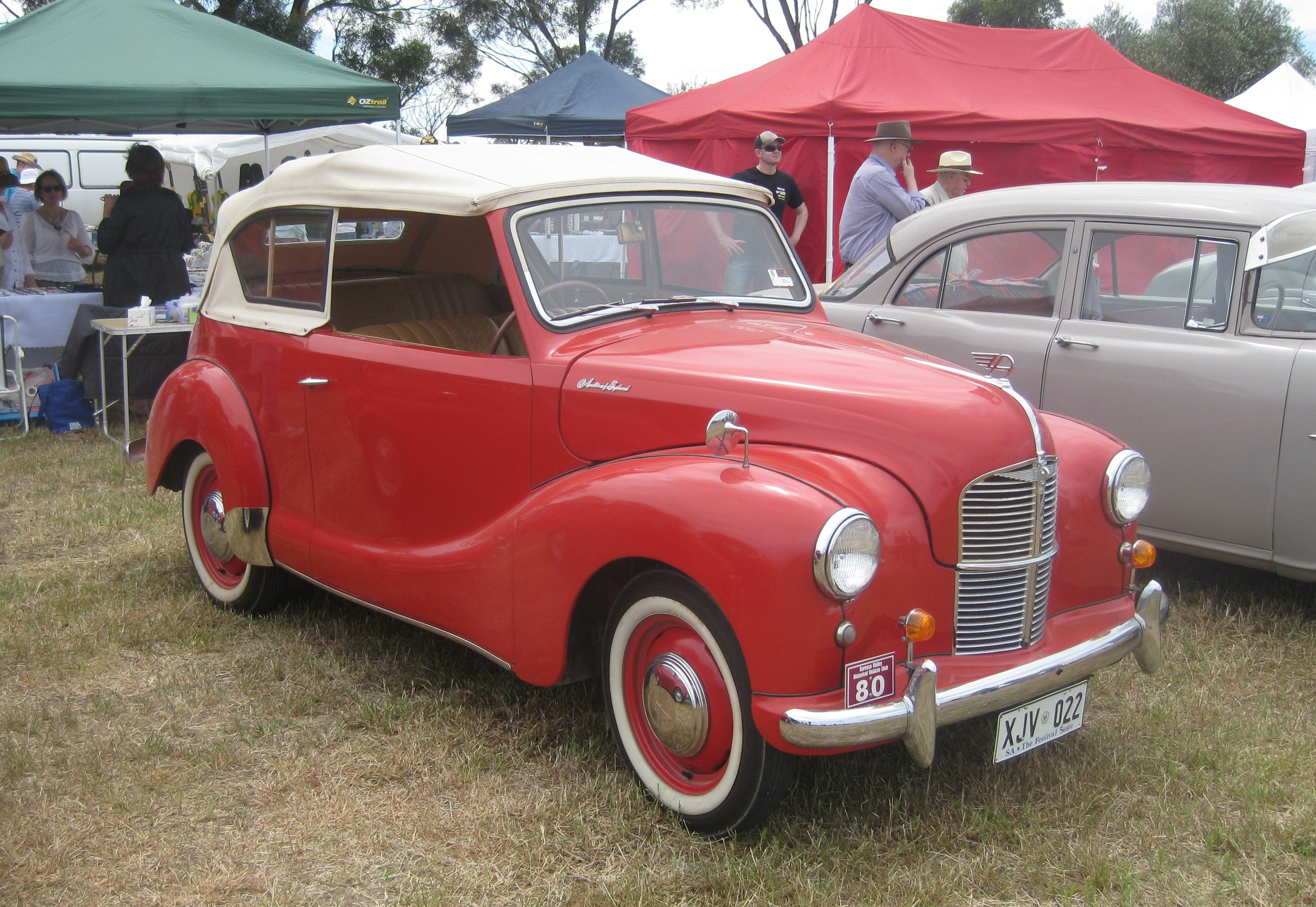
Austin A40 Tourer

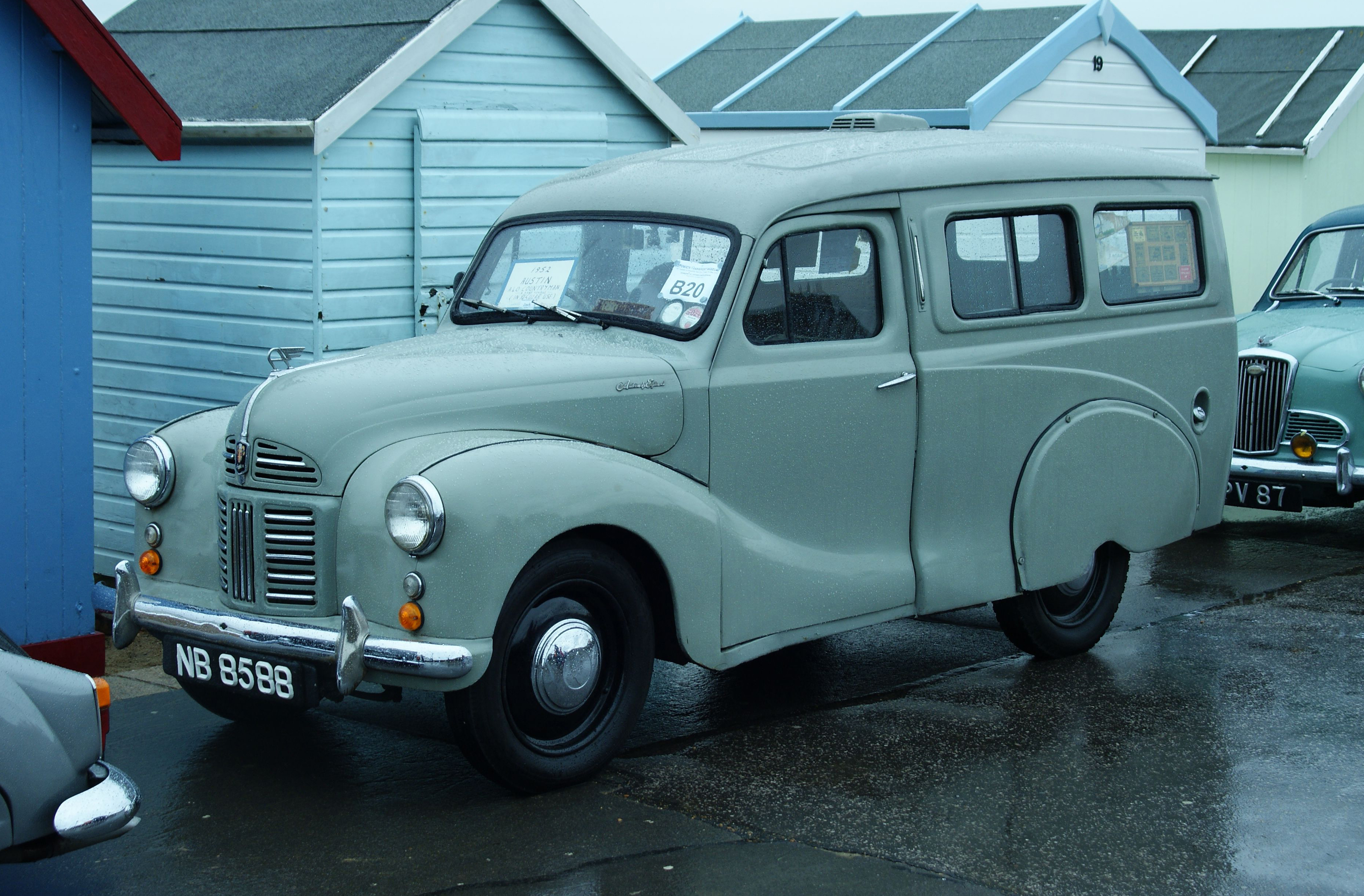
Austin A40 Countryman

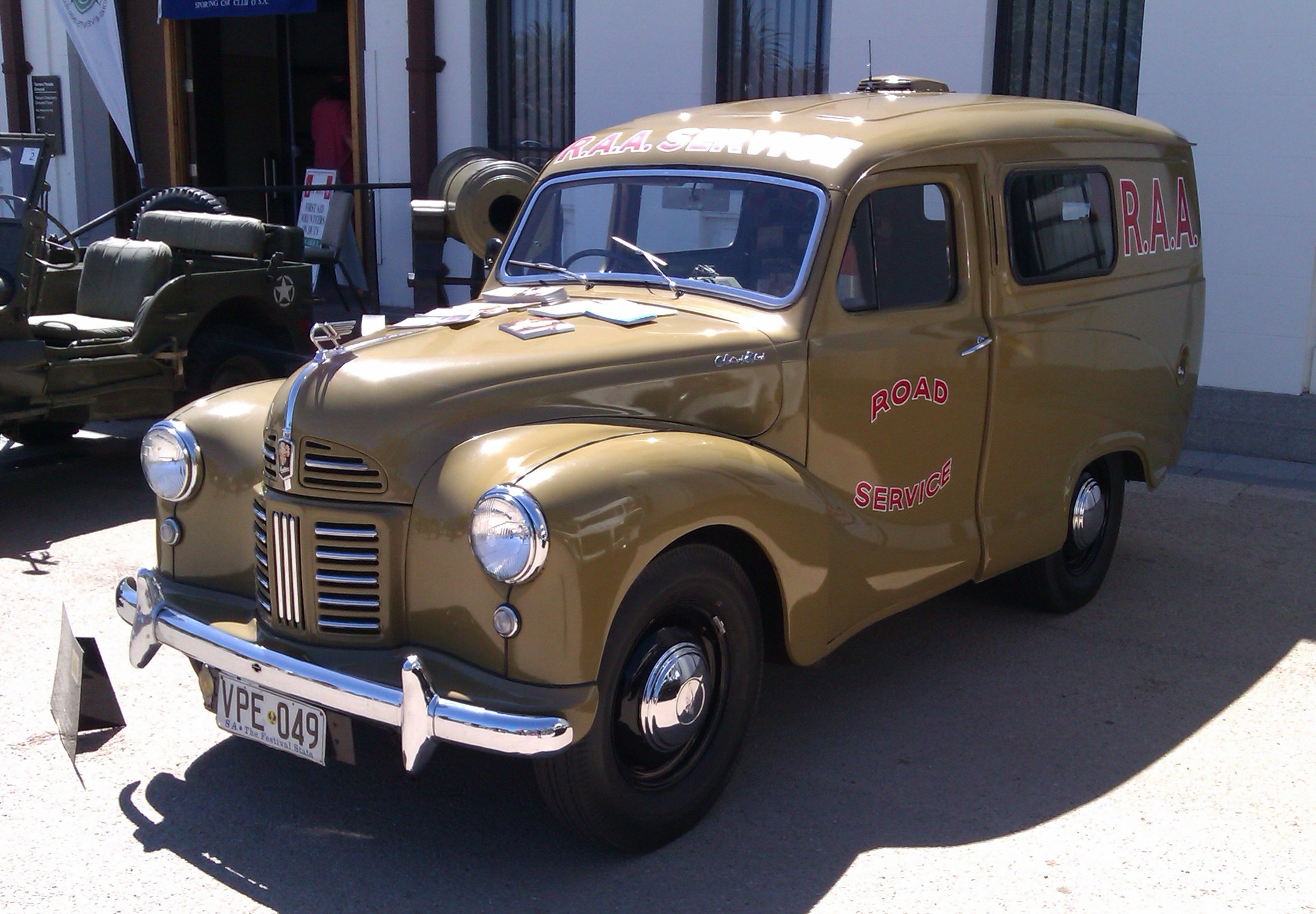
Austin A40 Van

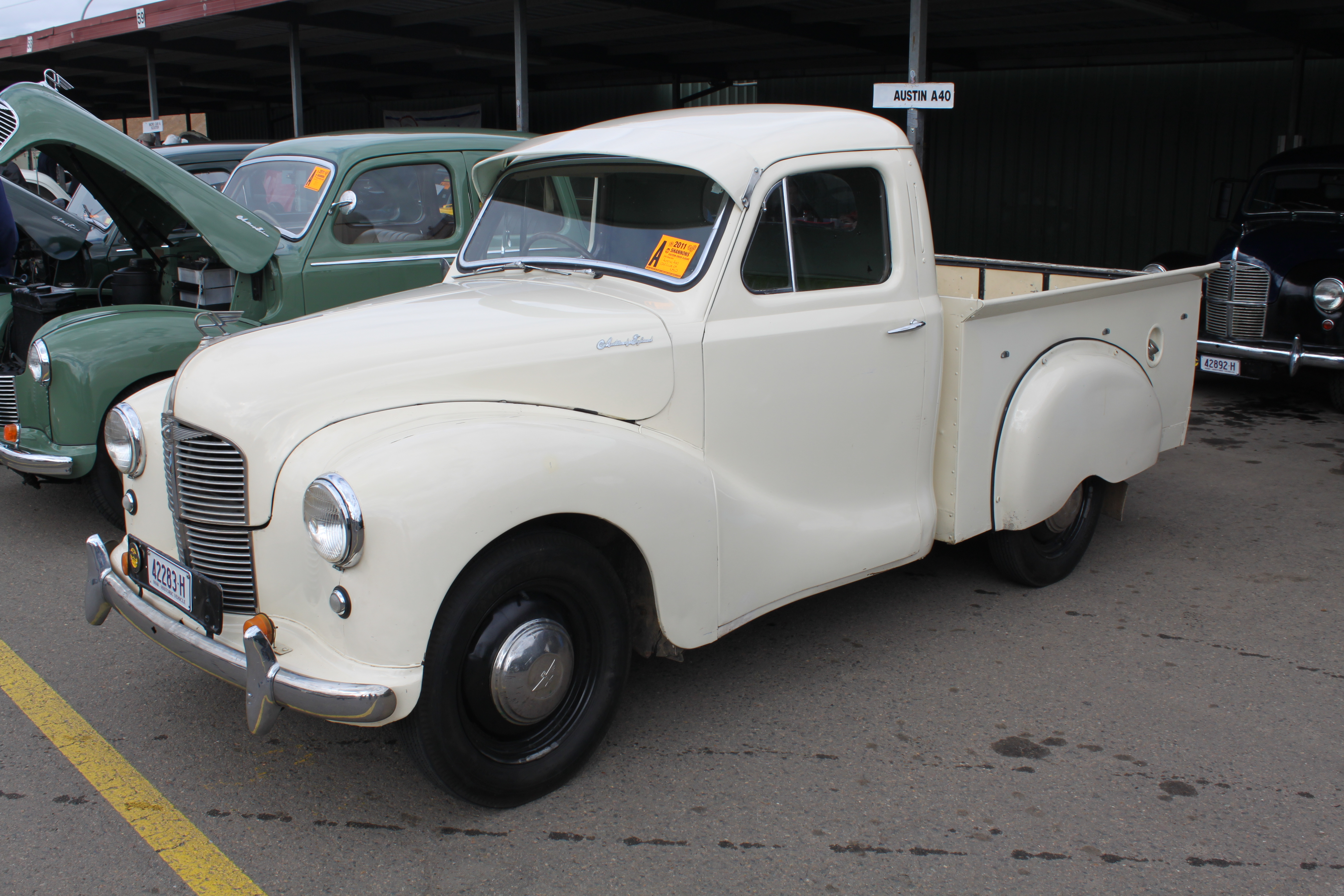
Austin A40 Pick-up

== Performance and driving impressions ==
A car tested by The Motor magazine in 1948 had a top speed of 70 mph (110 km/h) and could accelerate from 0–60 mph (97 km/h) in 37.2 seconds. A fuel consumption of 34.1 miles per imperial gallon (8.3 L/100 km; 28.4 mpg_{‑US}) was recorded. The test car, which had the optional sliding roof, cost £505 including taxes. Commentators also commended the "excellent (floor lever controlled four speed) gear change" (on the early models) with smooth clutch action. The brakes, however, needed "fairly firm pedal pressure ... for maximum results".

== Sales ==
The car sold well, boosting Austin's standing in the sales charts in the process. Its success was attributed to the fact that it offered a lot of car for the money.

== Austin A40 Sports ==
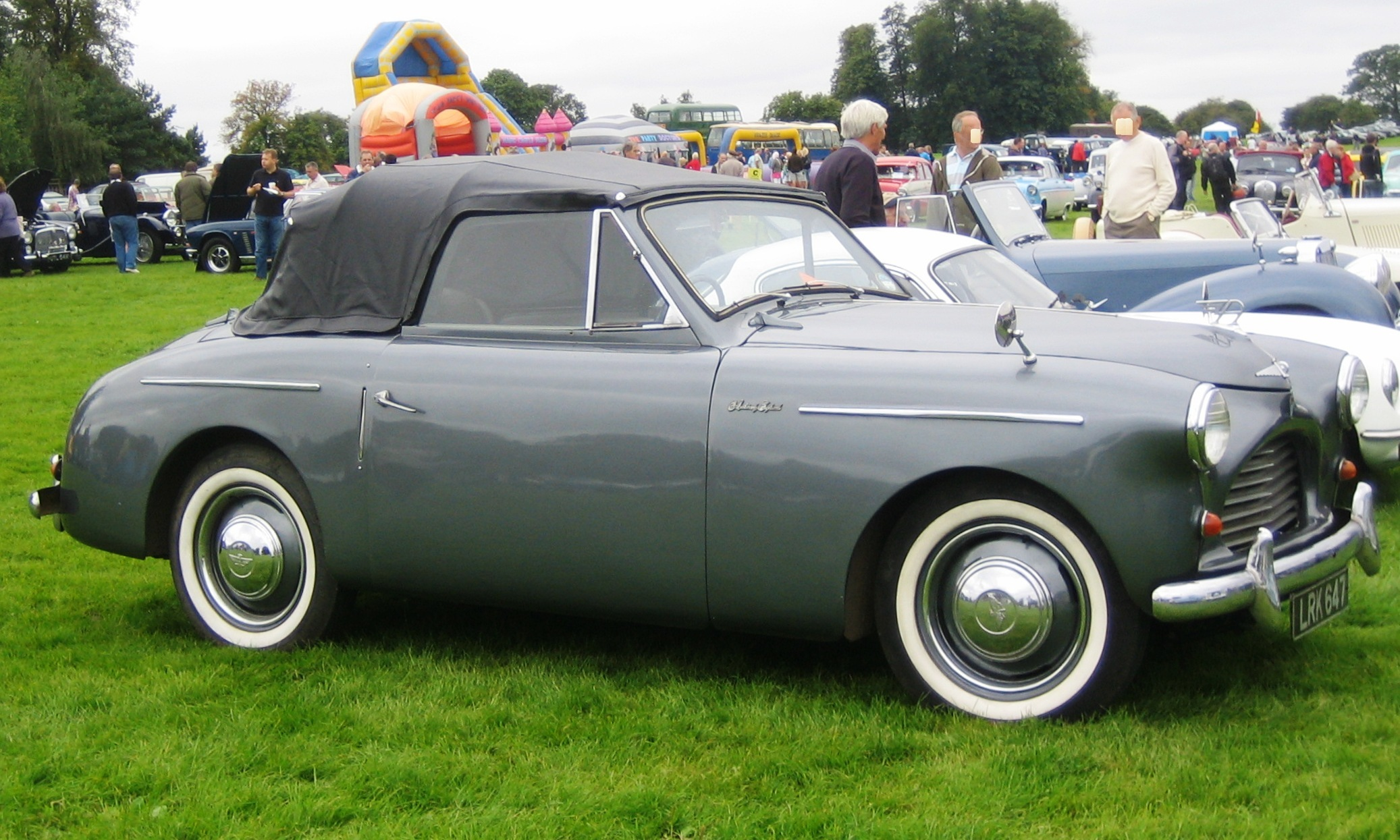
Austin A40 Sports, c. 1951, designed by Eric Neal of Jensen Motors, manufactured in conjunction with Jensen Motors, and based on Austin A40 Devon mechanicals

As one in a series of collaborations between Austin and Jensen Motors of West Bromwich, the A40 Sports originated when Austin's chairman Leonard Lord, upon seeing the Jensen Interceptor, requested that Jensen develop a body that could use the Austin A40 Devon mechanicals. The centre section of the chassis was boxed to provide rigidity for the open body, and the A40 Sports also employed a twin-SU carburettor version of the 1.2 L engine producing 46 bhp (34 kW), rather than 42 bhp (31 kW). During production, A40 Sports bodies were built by Jensen and transported to Austin's Longbridge plant for final assembly, with approximately 4,011 examples manufactured.
