= Piper PA-23 =

Family of twin engine general aviation aircraft built 1952–1981

PA-23 Apache/Aztec
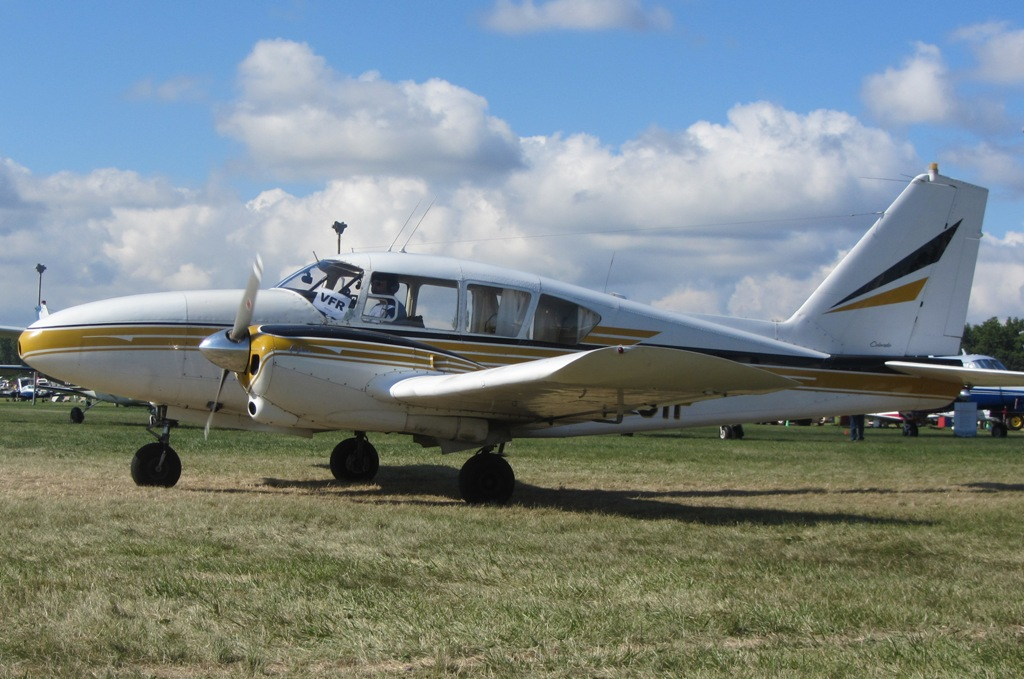
- PA-23 Aztec

General information
- Type: Twin-engined light piston utility
- Manufacturer: Piper Aircraft
- Number built: 6,976

History
- Manufactured: 1952–1981
- Introduction date: 1954
- First flight: 2 March 1952

The Piper PA-23, named Apache and later Aztec, is an American four- to six-seat twin-engined general aviation light aircraft, used also in small numbers by the United States Navy and military forces in other countries. Originally designed as the Twin Stinson in the 1950s by the Stinson Aircraft Company, it was produced as the Apache and a more powerful version, the Aztec, by Piper Aircraft in the United States from the 1950s to the 1980s.

== Design and development ==
The PA-23 was the first twin-engined Piper aircraft, and was developed from a proposed "Twin Stinson" design, inherited when Piper bought the Stinson Division of the Consolidated Vultee Aircraft Corporation. The prototype PA-23 was a four-seat, low-wing, all-metal monoplane with a twin tail, powered by two 125 hp Lycoming O-290-D piston engines; it first flew on March 2, 1952. The aircraft performed poorly, so it was redesigned with a single vertical stabilizer and an all-metal rear fuselage and more powerful 150 hp Lycoming O-320-A engines.

=== Apache ===
(ICAO code: PA23)

Two new prototypes of the redesigned aircraft, named Apache, were built in 1953 and entered production in 1954; 1,231 Apaches were built. In 1958, the Apache 160 was produced with upgraded 160 hp (119 kW) engines; 816 were built. The Apache 160 was superseded in 1962 by the Aztec-derived 235 hp (175 kW) Apache 235. With a 1962 price of $45,000, the Apache 235 featured the Aztec's engines and swept tail surfaces (119 built).

=== Aztec ===
(ICAO code: PA27)

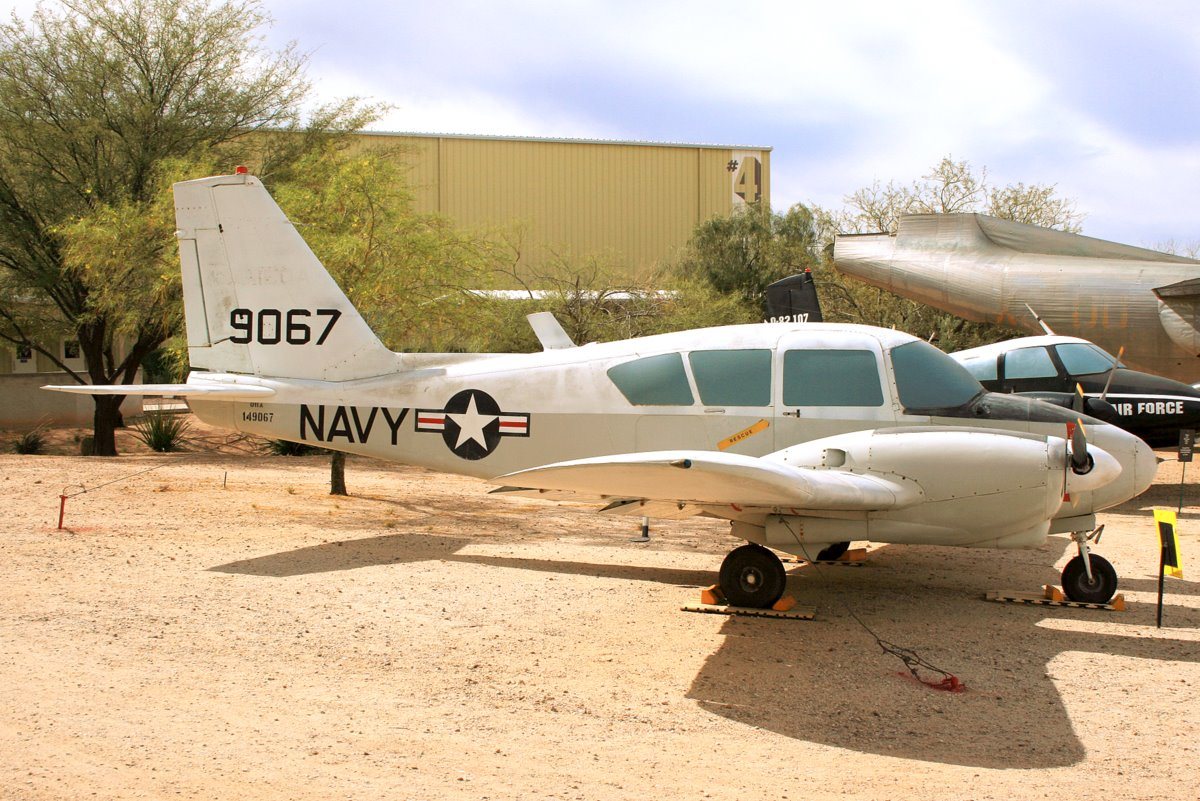
An ex-United States Navy U-11A on display at the Pima Air & Space Museum

In 1959, Piper produced an upgraded version with 250 hp (186 kW) Lycoming O-540 engines and a swept vertical tail as the PA-23-250, and named it Aztec. The first models came in a five-seat configuration. In 1961, a longer-nosed variant, the Aztec B, entered production. Later Aztecs were equipped with Lycoming IO-540 fuel-injected engines and six-seat capacity, and remained in production until 1982. Turbocharged versions of the later models could fly at higher altitudes.

The United States Navy acquired 20 Aztecs, designating them UO-1, which changed to U-11A when unified designations were adopted in 1962.

In 1974, Piper produced a single experimental PA-41P Pressurized Aztec concept. This concept was short-lived, however, as the aspects of the Aztec that made it so popular for its spacious interior and ability to haul large loads did not lend themselves well to supporting the sealed pressure vessel required for a pressurized aircraft. The project was scrapped, and the one pressurized Aztec produced, N9941P, was donated to Mississippi State University, where it was used for testing purposes. In 2000, N9941P was donated to the Piper Aviation Museum in Lock Haven, Pennsylvania, on the condition that it never be flown again. It is now there on display.

== Variants ==
=== Apache ===
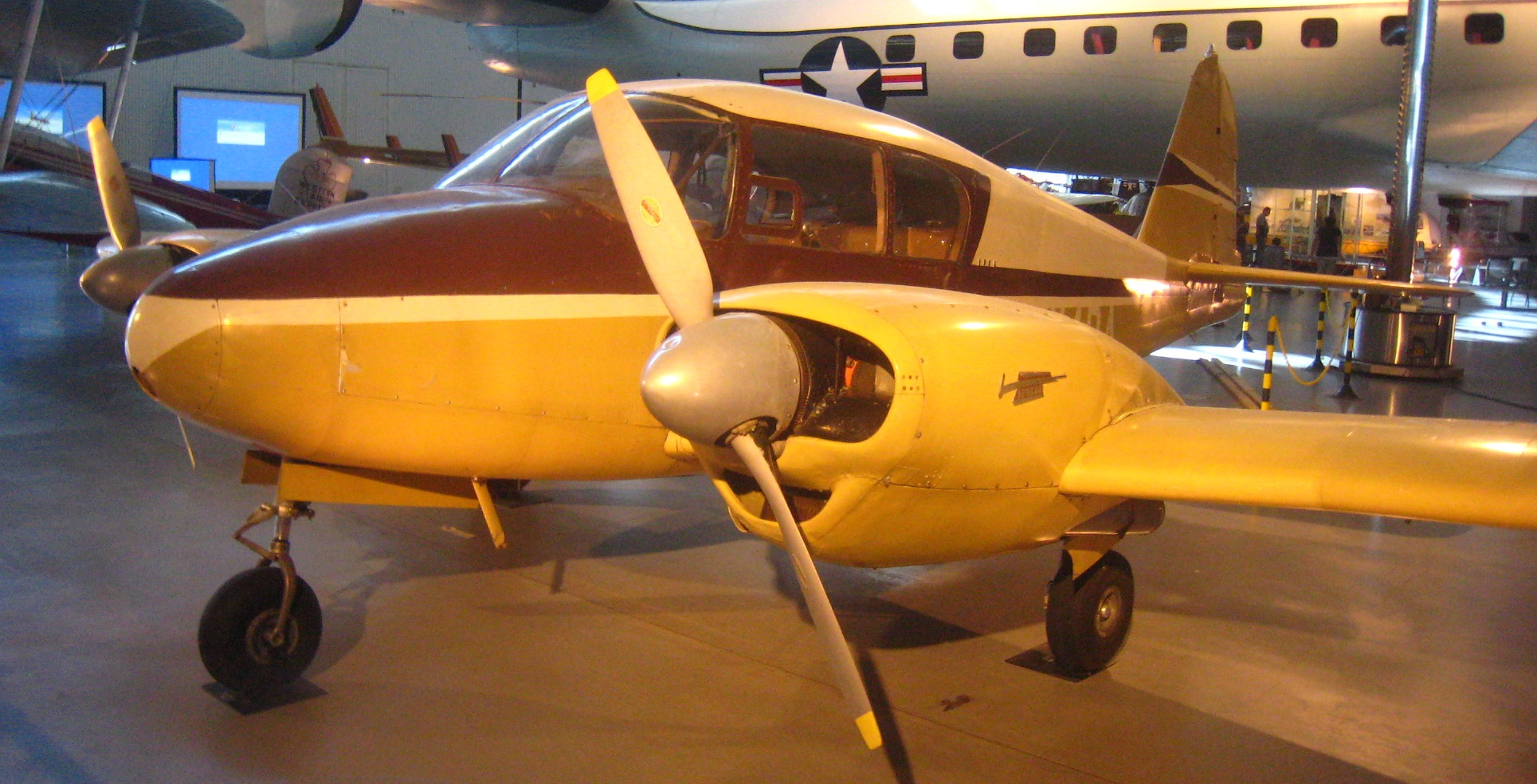
PA-23 Apache in National Air and Space Museum

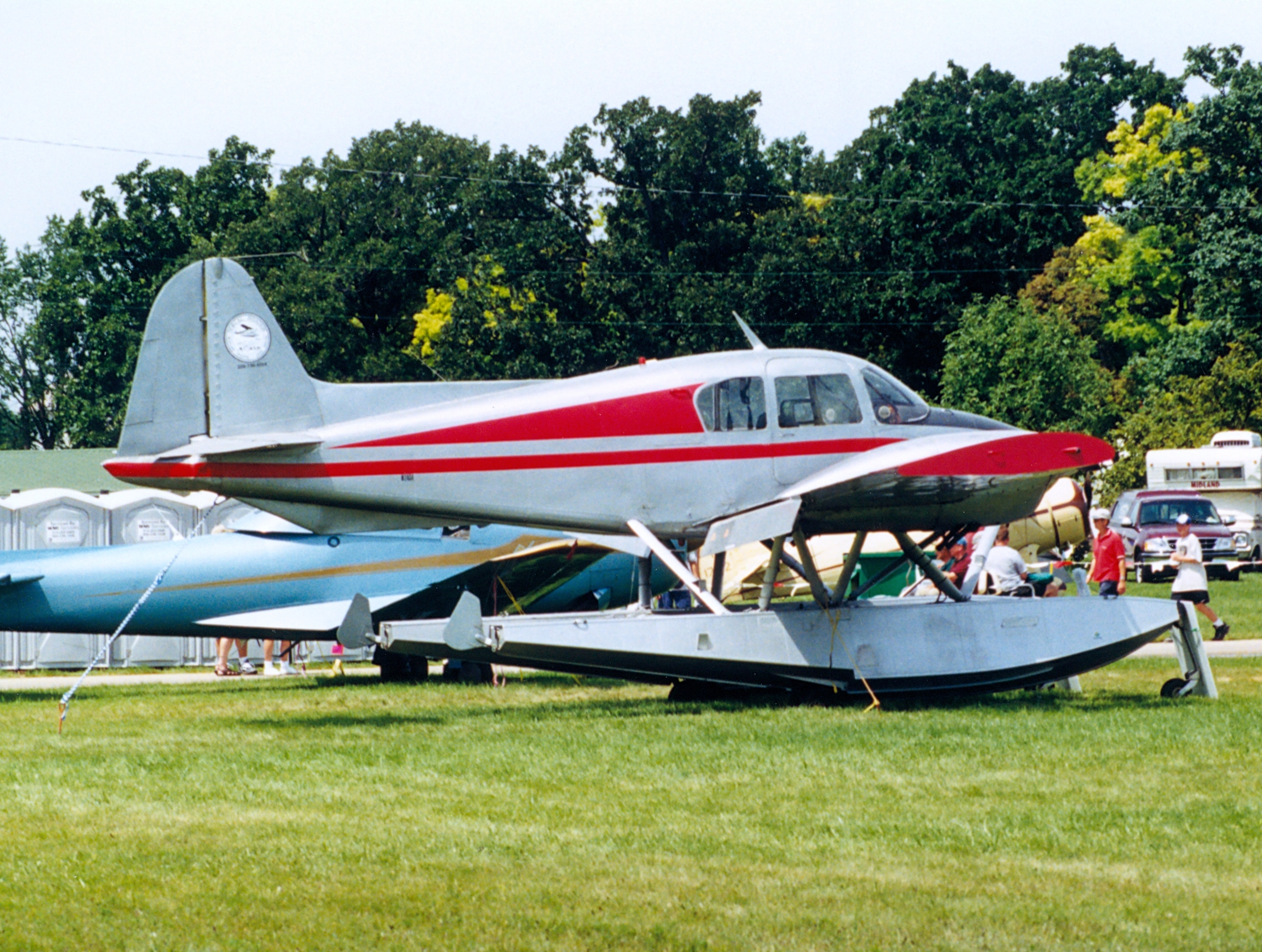
Apache on amphibious floats

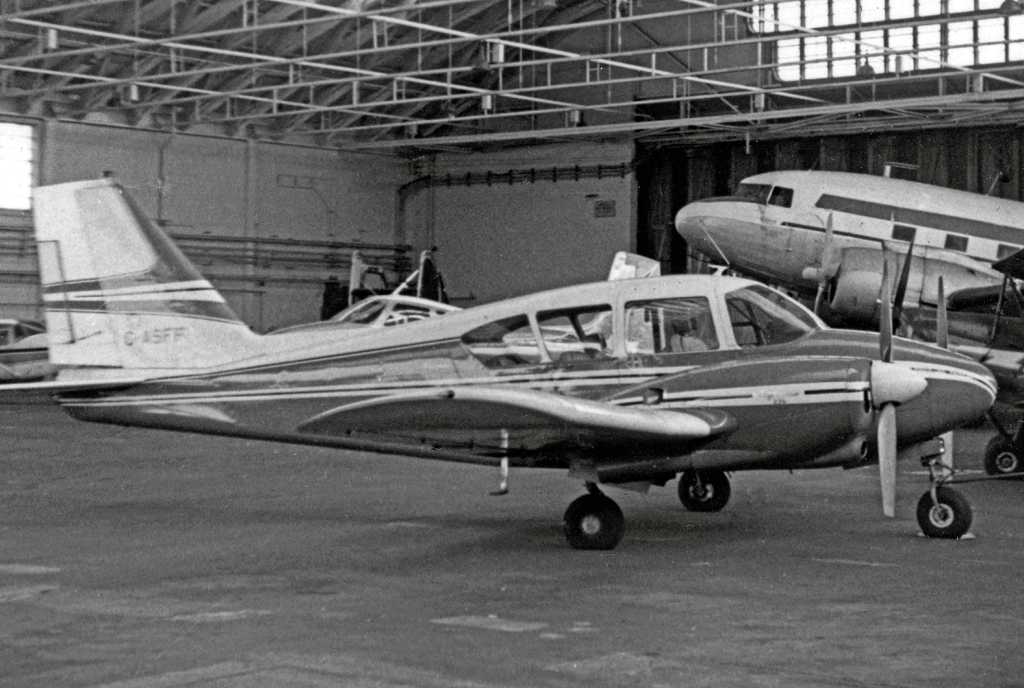
PA-23 Apache 235 fitted with the Aztec-style square fin and rudder

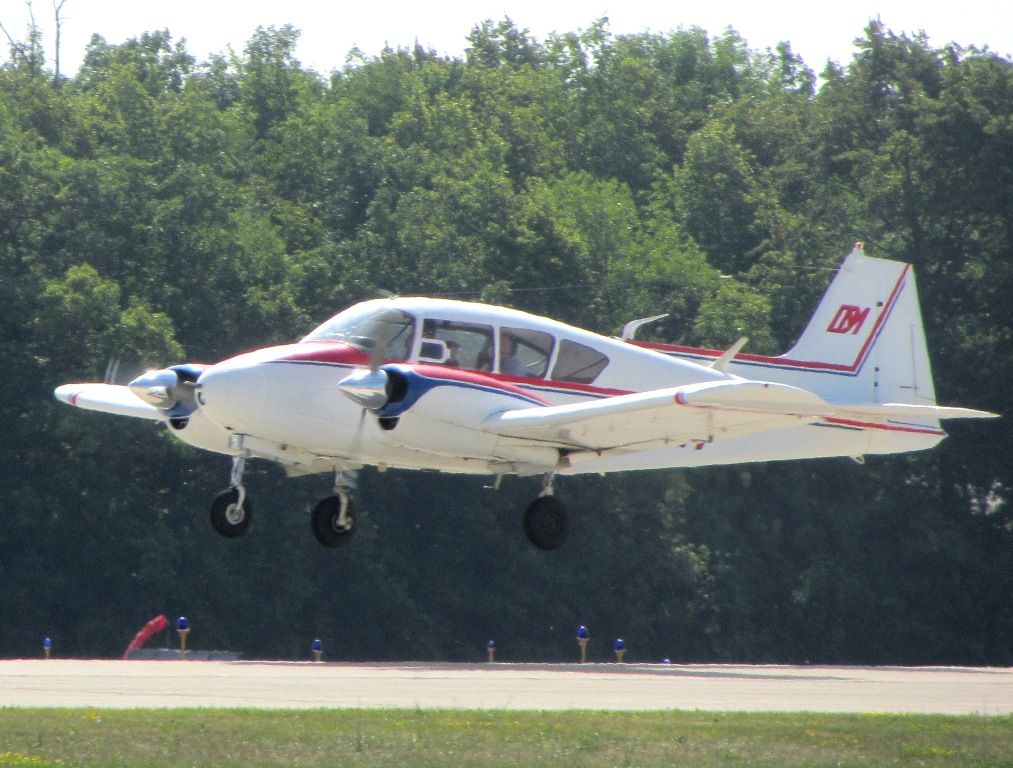
An Apache with Geronimo tail modification

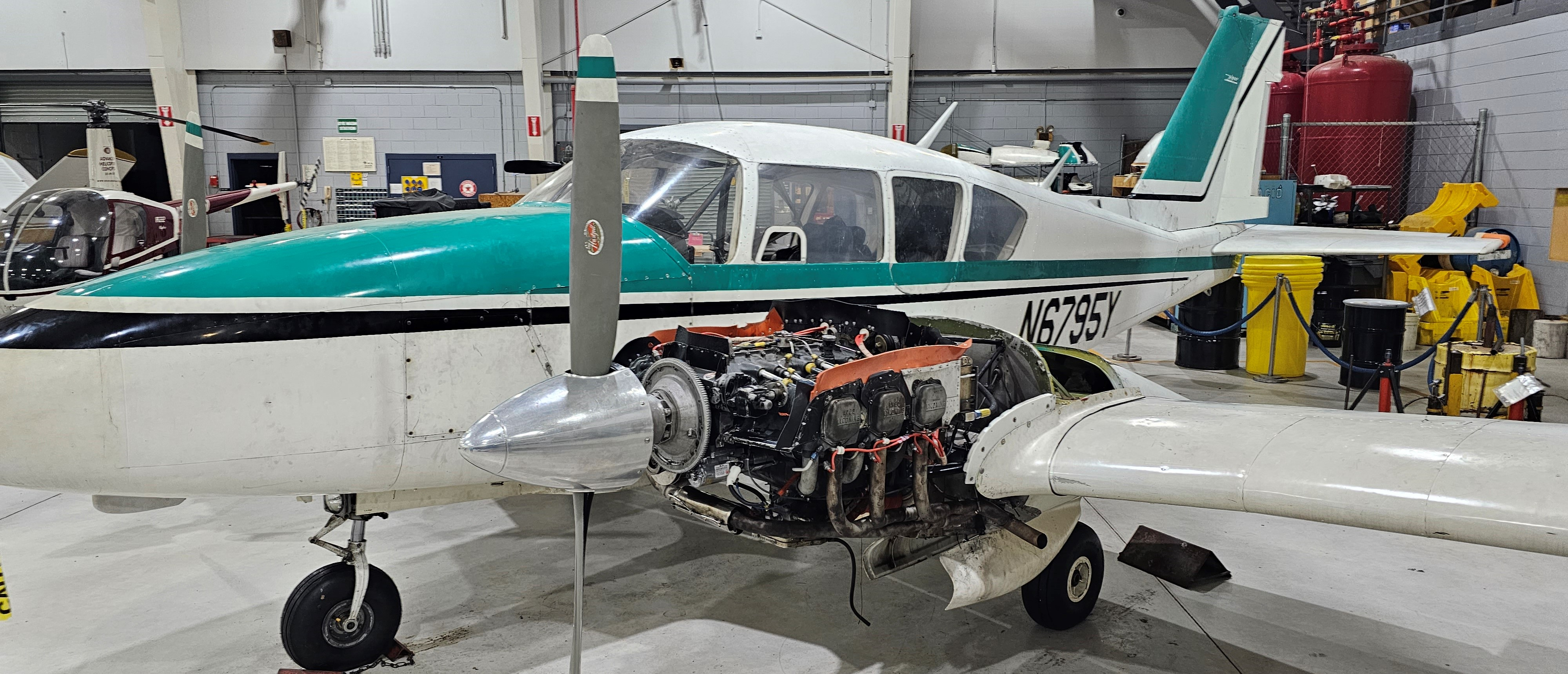
Piper Aztec C with de-cowled Lycoming IO-540-C4B5 engines

PA-23 Twin-Stinson
Original designation of the Piper PA-23 Apache
PA-23 Apache
Initial production version, 2047 built (including the Apache E, G and H)
PA-23-150 Apache B
1955 variant with minor changes
PA-23-150 Apache C
1956 variant with minor changes
PA-23-150 Apache D
1957 variant with minor changes
PA-23-160 Apache E
PA-23 powered by two 160 hp O-320-B engines
PA-23-160 Apache G
PA-23 with longer internal cabin and extra window
PA-23-160 Apache H
Apache G with O-320-B2B engines and minor changes
PA-23-235 Apache 235
Apache with five seats and 235 hp O-540 engines, 118 built
Seguin Geronimo
Apache with a series of modifications to the engines, nose, and tail

=== Aztec ===
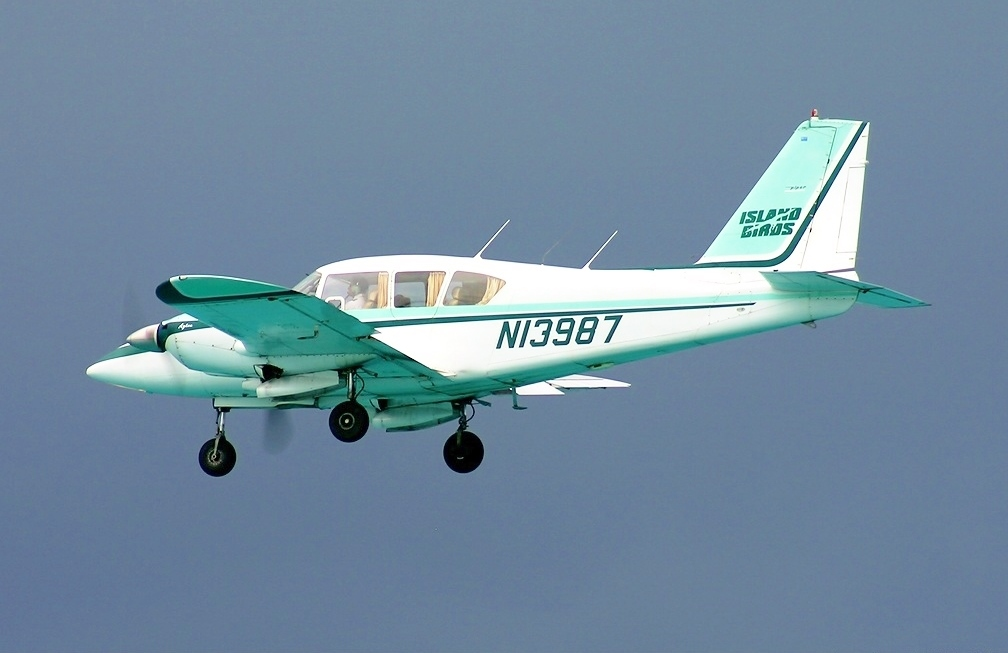
PA-23 Aztec over Maho Beach, St. Martin

PA-23-250 Aztec
Apache G with modified rear fuselage, new fin and rudder and 250hp Lycoming O-540-A1D engines, 4811 built (including subvariants)
PA-23-250 Aztec B
1962-1964. Aztec with longer nose for a baggage compartment; six seats, new instrument panel and changes to systems.
PA-23-250 Aztec C and Aztec C Turbo
1964-1968. Aztec B with either IO-540-C4B5 engines or turbocharged TIO-540-C1A as an option, also modified engine nacelles and modified landing gear.
PA-23-250 Aztec D and Aztec D Turbo
1969-1970. Aztec C with revised instrument panel and controls.
PA-23-250 Aztec E and Aztec E Turbo
1971-1975. Aztec D with longer pointed nose and a single-piece windshield.
PA-23-250 Aztec F and Aztec F Turbo
1976-1981. Aztec E with improved systems and cambered wingtips and tailplane tip extensions.
PA-E23-250 Aztec
Aztec variant with gross weight reduced from 5,200 lb (2,400 kg) to 4,995 lb (2,266 kg). Produced in the late 1960s and early 1970s exclusively for the United Kingdom market.
U-11A
United States Navy designation formerly UO-1.
UO-1
United States Navy designation for PA-23-250 Aztec with additional equipment; 20 delivered, later re-designated U-11A.
C-26
Brazilian Air Force designation of the PA-23-250 Aztec.
PA-41P Pressurized Aztec
Pressurized Aztec concept, one built.

== Operators ==
=== Military operators ===
Angola
Argentina
Bolivia
Brazil
Cameroon
Colombia
Costa Rica

- Public Force of Costa Rica

Cuba

- Fuezas Aéreas Ejército de Cuba

El Salvador
Guatemala

- Guatemalan Air Force

Honduras

- Honduran Air Force

Haiti

- Haitian Air Force

Madagascar
Mexico
Nicaragua

- Nicaraguan Air Force

Spain

- Spanish Air Force
  - Escuadrón 912
  - Escuadrilla de Enlace 905

Paraguay

- Paraguayan Air Force
  - Grupo Aéreo de Transporte Especial/GATE

Papua New Guinea

- Air Operations Element, Papua New Guinea Defence Force - former operator

Uganda
United States

- United States Navy

Venezuela
Uruguay
- Uruguayan Air Force

== Accidents and incidents ==
- On 21 March 1964, a Piper PA-23-160 Apache (G-ASHC) crashed on its approach to the Aintree racecourse, near Liverpool, England, killing all 5 on board. The flight had taken off from Luton Airport and included broadcaster Nancy Spain, who was covering the Grand National, and her partner Joan Werner Laurie, who was learning to fly. The CAA accident report stated that passenger interference could not be ruled out as a cause of the accident.
- On 8 May 1966, Pennsylvania Attorney General Walter Alessandroni, his wife, Montgomery County Republican chairman James E. Staudinger, and pilot Melvin E. Ladin were killed when the Piper Aztec they were traveling to a campaign speech in crashed in the Allegheny Mountains near Somerset, Pennsylvania.
- On 18 July 1967, Aztec C PP-ETT was hit by a Lockheed T-33 of the Brazilian Air Force near Mondubim, Brazil, killing former Brazilian President Humberto de Alencar Castelo Branco.
- On 18 April 1974, Aztec G-AYDE collided with Court Line Flight 95, a BAC One-Eleven, at London Luton Airport after the pilot of the Aztec entered the active runway without clearance. He was killed and his passenger was injured. All 91 people on board the One-Eleven successfully evacuated after the takeoff was aborted.
- On 29 November 1975, retired Formula One racing driver and Embassy Hill team owner Graham Hill was piloting a Piper PA-23-250 Turbo Aztec D, marked as N6645Y, (Note: Although marked with U.S. registration and carrying matching and unexpired registration documents, the aircraft's U.S. registration had been canceled after it was exported to the Bahamas, and its new owners had not re-registered it.) from Circuit Paul Ricard, France, to London, United Kingdom. His passengers were Embassy Hill race driver Tony Brise, team manager Ray Brimble, designer Andy Smallman, and mechanics Terry Richards and Tony Alcock. While on approach to land at Elstree Airfield, Hertfordshire, shortly before 10 pm, the aircraft hit trees on a golf course at Arkley, Hertfordshire in thick fog. The ensuing crash and explosion killed everyone on board.
- On 15 April 1978, Hollywood stunt flyer Frank Tallman was ferrying a Piper Aztec from Santa Monica Airport, California, to Phoenix, Arizona under visual flight rules when he continued the flight into deteriorating weather, a lowering ceiling, and rain. He struck the side of Santiago Peak in the Santa Ana Mountains near Trabuco Canyon at cruise altitude, and was killed in the crash.

== Specifications (PA-23-250F, normally aspirated) ==
3-view line drawing of the Piper PA-23-150 Apache

3-view line drawing of the Piper PA-23-250 Aztec

Data from Jane's All The World's Aircraft 1976–77

General characteristics

- Crew: 1
- Capacity: 5 passengers
- Length: 31 ft 2 3/4 in (9.519 m)
- Wingspan: 37 ft 2 1/2 in (11.341 m)
- Height: 10 ft 4 in (3.15 m)
- Wing area: 207.56 sq ft (19.283 m^{2})
- Aspect ratio: 6.8:1
- Airfoil: USA 35B (modified)
- Empty weight: 3,180 lb (1,442 kg)
- Max takeoff weight: 5,200 lb (2,359 kg)
- Fuel capacity: 140 US gal (120 imp gal; 530 L) usable fuel (normal), optional extra tanks with 40 US gal (33 imp gal; 150 L)
- Powerplant: 2 × Lycoming IO-540-C4B5 normally aspirated air-cooled flat-six piston engines, 250 hp (190 kW) each
- Propellers: 2-bladed Hartzell HC-E2YK-2RB constant-speed propellers

Performance

- Maximum speed: 215 mph (346 km/h, 187 kn)
- Cruise speed: 172 mph (277 km/h, 149 kn) at 10,200 ft (3,100 m) (long-range cruise)
- Stall speed: 68 mph (109 km/h, 59 kn) (flaps down)
- Never exceed speed: 277 mph (446 km/h, 241 kn)
- Range: 1,519 mi (2,445 km, 1,320 nmi) at long-range cruise
- Service ceiling: 18,950 ft (5,780 m) (absolute ceiling)
- Rate of climb: 1,400 ft/min (7.1 m/s)
- Takeoff distance to 50 ft (15 m): 1,695 ft (517 m)
- Landing distance from 50 ft (15 m): 1,695 ft (517 m)

== See also ==
Aircraft of comparable role, configuration, and era

- Beagle B.206
- Beechcraft Baron
- Beechcraft Travel Air
- Beechcraft Twin Bonanza
- Cessna 310
- Helio Twin Courier
- Let L-200 Morava
- Partenavia P.68
- Piper PA-34 Seneca
