= Graham Hill =

British racing driver (1929–1975)

Graham Hill OBE
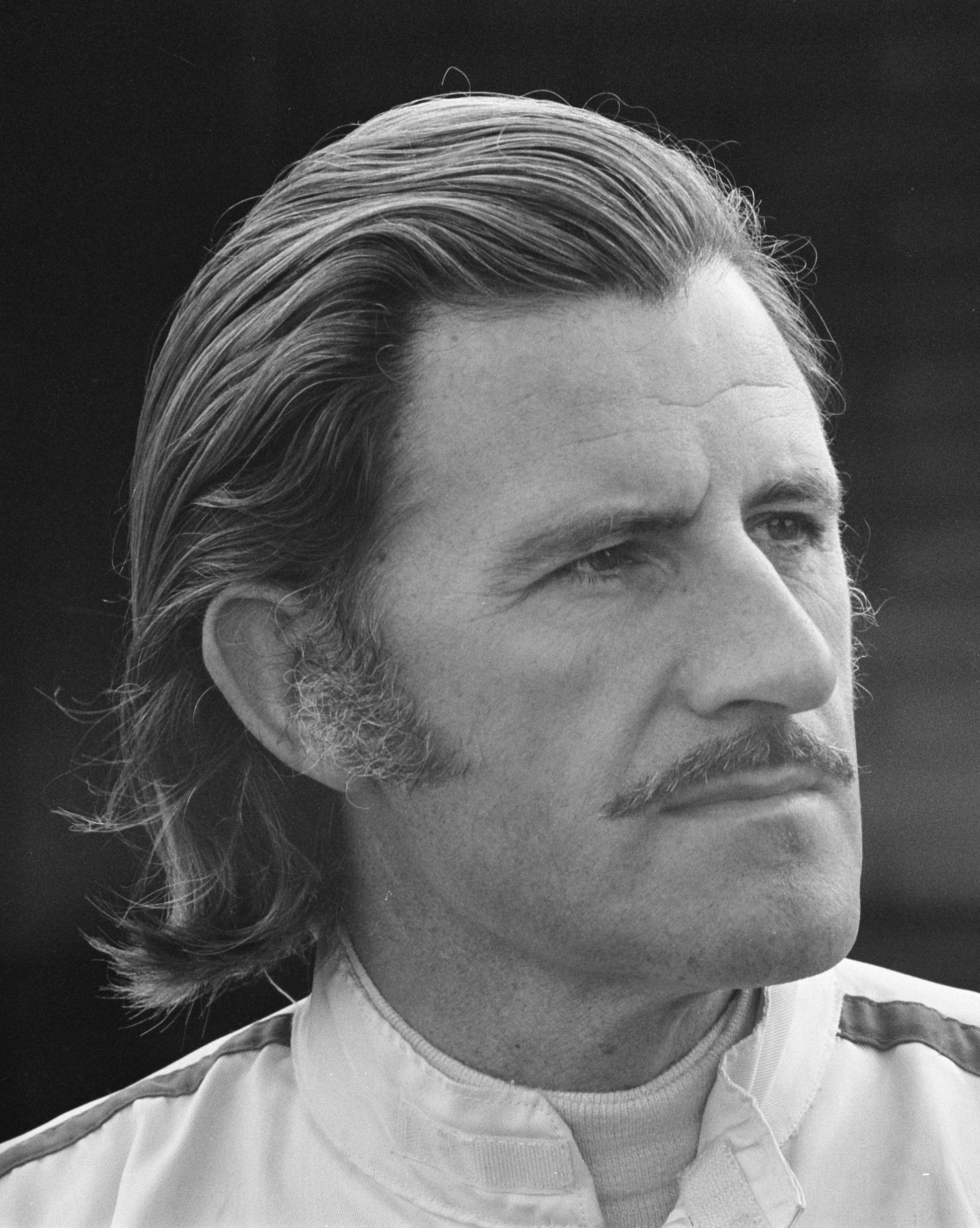
- Hill at the 1971 Dutch Grand Prix
- Born: Norman Graham Hill; 15 February 1929; Hampstead, London, England
- Died: 29 November 1975 (aged 46); Arkley, London, England
- Cause of death: Plane crash
- Spouse: Bette Shubrook (m. 1955)
- Children: 3, including Damon

Formula One World Championship career
- Nationality: (United Kingdom) British
- Active years: 1958–1975
- Team(s): Lotus, BRM, Walker, Brabham, Hill
- Entries: 179 (176 starts)
- Championships: 2 (1962, 1968)
- Wins: 14
- Podiums: 36
- Career points: 270 (289) (Note: Up until 1990, not all points scored by a driver contributed to their final World Championship tally (see list of points scoring systems for more information). Numbers without parentheses are Championship points; numbers in parentheses are total points scored.)
- Pole positions: 13
- Fastest laps: 10
- First entry: 1958 Monaco Grand Prix
- First win: 1962 Dutch Grand Prix
- Last win: 1969 Monaco Grand Prix
- Last entry: 1975 Monaco Grand Prix

Champ Car career
- 3 races run over 4 years
- Best finish: 9th (1966)
- First race: 1966 Indianapolis 500 (Indianapolis)
- Last race: 1968 Indianapolis 500 (Indianapolis)
- First win: 1966 Indianapolis 500 (Indianapolis)
Wins	Podiums	Poles
1	1	0

24 Hours of Le Mans career
- Years: 1958–1966, 1972
- Teams: Lotus, Porsche, NART, Aston Martin, BRM, Ferrari, Mann, Matra
- Best finish: 1st (1972)
- Class wins: 1 (1972)

Norman Graham Hill (15 February 1929 – 29 November 1975) was a British racing driver, rower and motorsport executive, who competed in Formula One from 1958 to 1975. Nicknamed "Mr. Monaco", (Note: Hill was widely known as Mr. Monaco for his five Monaco Grand Prix victories, a record which stood until Ayrton Senna won his sixth in 1993.) Hill won two Formula One World Drivers' Championship titles and, at the time of his retirement, held the record for most podium finishes (36); he won 14 Grands Prix across 18 seasons. In American open-wheel racing, Hill won the Indianapolis 500 in 1966 with Mecom. Upon winning the 24 Hours of Le Mans in 1972 with Matra, Hill became the first—and as of 2026, only—driver to complete the Triple Crown of Motorsport. (Note: The Triple Crown of Motorsport is an unofficial achievement of winning the Indianapolis 500, the 24 Hours of Le Mans, and the Formula One World Drivers' Championship. In the modern popular definition, the Monaco Grand Prix—which Hill won on five occasions—commonly replaces the World Drivers' Championship.)

Born and raised in London, Hill studied engineering before completing national service in the Royal Navy. He was a member of London Rowing Club from 1952 to 1954, contesting twenty finals and stroking the London crew in the Grand Challenge Cup. He made his racing debut in Formula Three aged 25. He initially joined Lotus in Formula One as a mechanic, before earning a driving debut with the team at the 1958 Monaco Grand Prix and securing a full-time contract. After non-classified championship finishes in 1958 and 1959 with Lotus, Hill moved to BRM in 1960, scoring his maiden podium at the Dutch Grand Prix. BRM fielded the competitive P57 in 1962, with Hill taking his maiden victory at the season-opening Dutch Grand Prix and winning three further Grands Prix as he secured his maiden title, beating career rival Jim Clark and Bruce McLaren. He finished runner-up to Clark the following season, before losing the 1964 title by one point to John Surtees. (Note: In the 1963 to 1965 points system, each driver's best six results counted towards the Drivers' Championship. With all results counted, Hill scored 41 points to Surtees' 40.) Hill took multiple wins in 1965 as he finished runner-up to Clark once more in the standings. After a winless 1966 campaign, Hill returned to Lotus to partner Clark.

Helping develop the Lotus 49 for the new Cosworth DFV engines, Hill struggled with reliability throughout 1967, with podiums in Monaco and the United States. Clark was killed after their 1–2 finish at the season opener in 1968, leaving Hill in a close title battle with Jackie Stewart, which Hill won at the final race of the season. In 1969, Hill became a five-time winner of the Monaco Grand Prix, a record he held for 24 years. During the United States Grand Prix, Hill was seriously injured in a crash, breaking both of his legs and ending his season prematurely. After recovering from his injuries, he returned as a privateer in 1970 before competing with Brabham for two further seasons, where he won the non-championship BRDC International Trophy in 1971. Hill founded and competed for Embassy Hill from 1973 to 1975, retiring from motor racing after the Monaco Grand Prix to focus on team ownership and supporting his protégé Tony Brise. In addition to his two championships, Hill achieved 14 race wins, 13 pole positions, ten fastest laps and 36 podiums in Formula One.

Outside Formula One, Hill entered the 24 Hours of Le Mans ten times between 1958 and 1972, winning the latter alongside Henri Pescarolo in the Matra-Simca MS670. He also entered the Indianapolis 500 three times from 1966 to 1968, winning the Borg-Warner Trophy at his first attempt. Throughout his early years, Hill also competed in the British Saloon Car Championship, topping his class in 1963, and entered six seasons of the Tasman Series, finishing runner-up to Stewart in 1966. In November 1975, Hill and five other Embassy Hill executives, including Brise, were killed when the Piper PA-23 Aztec aircraft Hill was piloting crashed in low-visibility conditions in north London whilst returning from a test session for the Hill GH2 at the Circuit Paul Ricard. Embassy Hill subsequently shut down ahead of the 1976 season. Hill's son Damon went on to win the World Drivers' Championship in 1996, becoming the first father-and-son World Drivers' Champions. Hill was inducted into the International Motorsports Hall of Fame in 1990.

== Early life ==
Hill was born in Hampstead, London, one of two sons of stockbroker Norman Herbert Devereux Hill, of Belsize Park, and his wife Constance Mary, née Philp. He attended Hendon Technical College and joined Smiths Instruments as an apprentice engineer. He was conscripted into the Royal Navy and served as an Engine Room Artificer (ERA) on the light cruiser HMS Swiftsure, rising to the rank of petty officer. After leaving the navy, he rejoined Smiths Instruments.

== Racing career ==
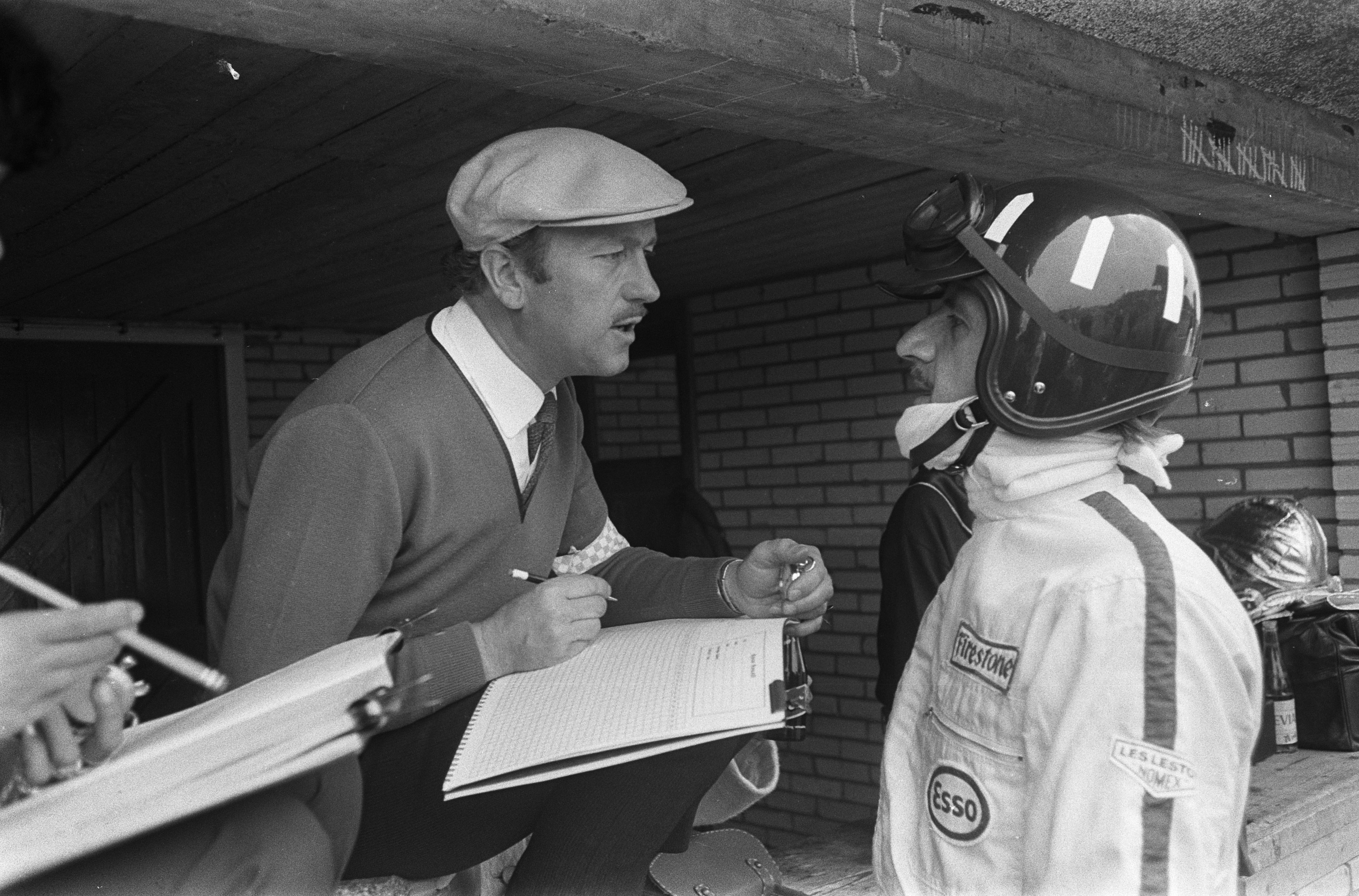
Hill and Colin Chapman at the 1967 Dutch Grand Prix.

Hill did not pass his driving test until he was 24 years old, and he himself described his first car as "A wreck. A budding racing driver should own such a car, as it teaches delicacy, poise and anticipation, mostly the latter I think!" He had been interested in motorcycles, but in 1954 he saw an advertisement for the Universal Motor Racing Club at Brands Hatch offering laps for five shillings. He made his debut in a Cooper 500 Formula 3 car and was committed to racing thereafter. Hill joined Team Lotus as a mechanic soon after but quickly talked his way into the cockpit. The Lotus presence in Formula One (F1) allowed him to make his debut at the 1958 Monaco Grand Prix, retiring with a halfshaft failure.

In 1960, Hill joined BRM, he won also in that year on 8 May 1960 the Targa Florio in the class Sports 1600 together with a German driver Edgar Barth in a Porsche 718, and won the world championship with BRM in 1962. He was known for his race preparation, keeping records of the settings on his car and working long hours with his mechanics. Hill was also part of the so-called 'British invasion' of drivers and cars in the Indianapolis 500 during the mid-1960s, triumphing there in 1966 in a Lola-Ford.

At the same time, Hill along with his F1 contemporaries competed in the British Saloon Car Championship, scoring several outright wins. He achieved a best finish of sixth overall in 1961 driving a Jaguar Mark 2.

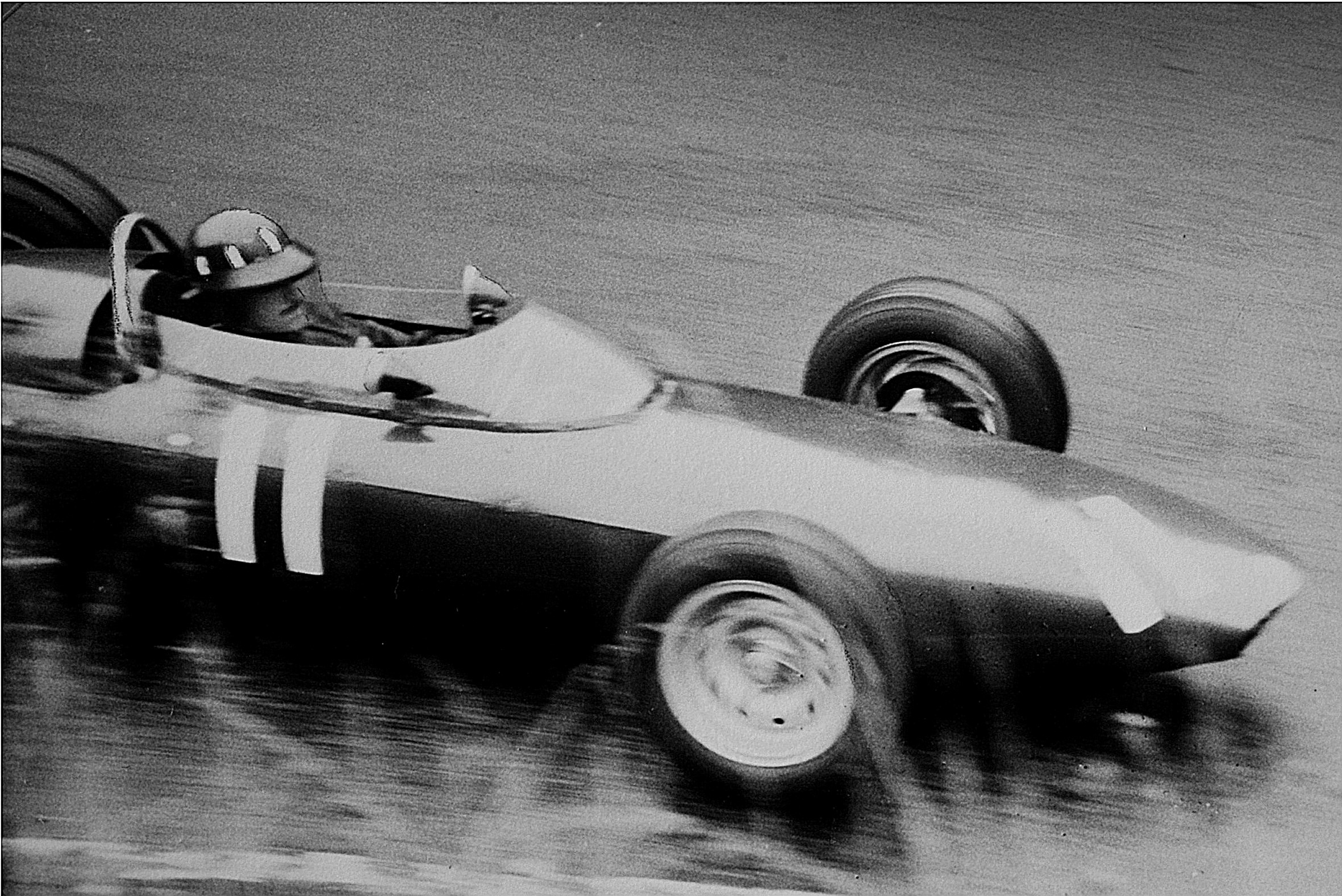
Hill at the 1962 German Grand Prix

In 1967, back at Lotus, Hill helped to develop the Lotus 49 with the new Cosworth-V8 engine. It fell to Hill to perform the initial testing of the new car and its engine. After the first shakedown run, Hill quipped "Well, it's got some poke! Not a bad old tool." After teammates Jim Clark and Mike Spence were killed in early 1968, Hill led the team, and won his second world championship in 1968. The Lotus had a reputation of being very fragile and dangerous at that time, especially with the new aerodynamic aids which caused similar crashes of Hill and Jochen Rindt at the 1969 Spanish Grand Prix. A crash at the 1969 United States Grand Prix at Watkins Glen broke both his legs and interrupted his career. Typically, when asked soon after the crash if he wanted to pass on a message to his wife, Hill replied "Just tell her that I won't be dancing for two weeks."

Upon recovery, Hill continued to race in F1 for several more years, but never again with the same level of success. Colin Chapman, believing Hill was a spent force, placed him in Rob Walker's team for 1970, sweetening the deal with one of the brand-new Lotus 72 cars. Although Hill scored points in 1970, he started the season far from fully fit and the 72 was not fully developed until late in the season. Hill moved to Brabham for 1971–2; his last win in F1 was in the non-Championship International Trophy at Silverstone in 1971 with the "lobster claw" Brabham. The team was in flux after the retirements of Sir Jack Brabham and then Ron Tauranac's sale to Bernie Ecclestone; Hill did not settle there.

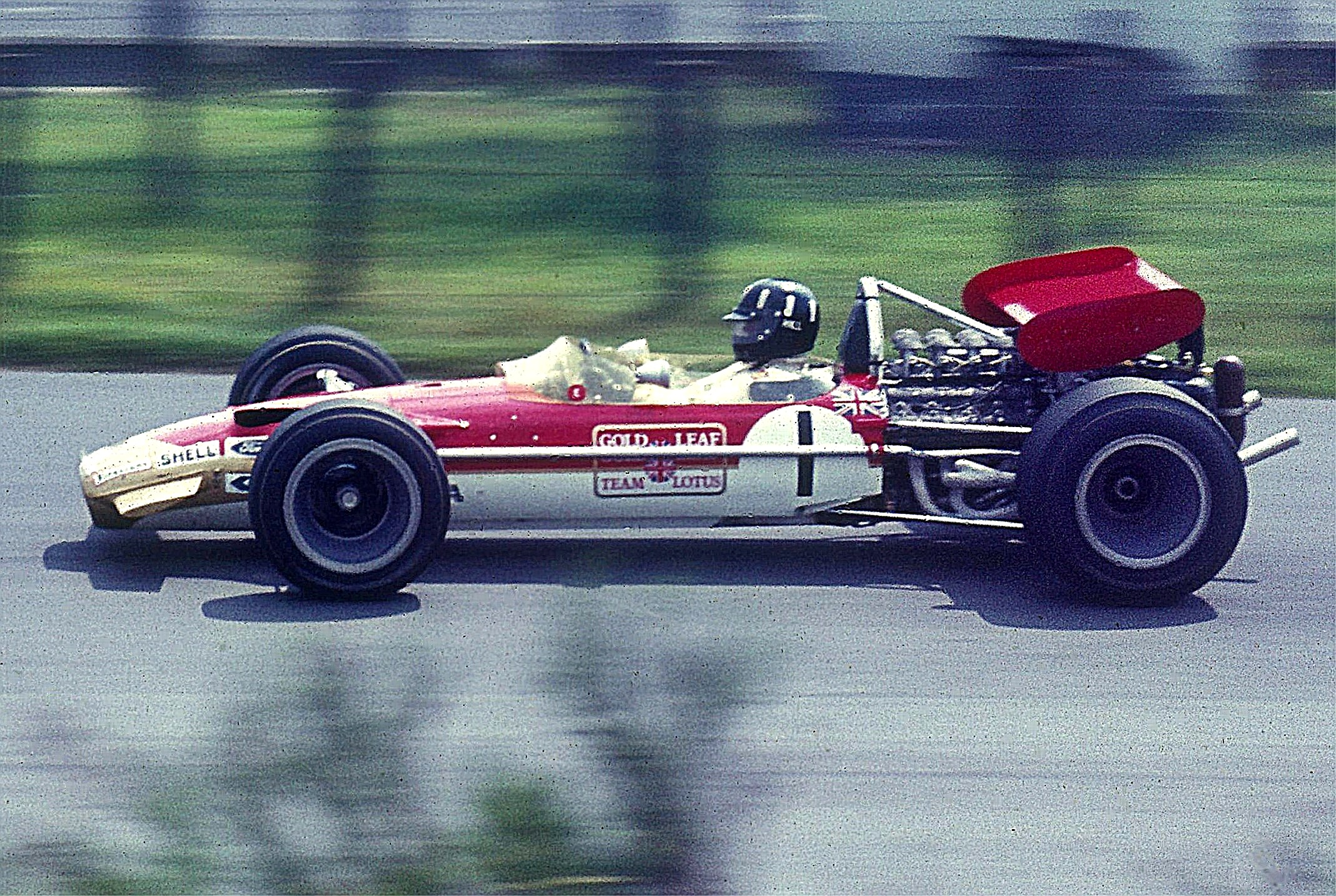
Hill at the 1969 German Grand Prix

Hill was known during the latter part of his career for his wit and became a popular personality – he was a regular guest on television and wrote a notably frank and witty autobiography, Life at the Limit, when recovering from his 1969 accident. A second autobiography, which covered his career up until his retirement from racing simply called Graham was published posthumously in 1976. A staunch campaigner for road safety, Hill presented a series for Thames Television entitled Advanced Driving with Graham Hill comprising six 30-minute programmes broadcast weekly in June and July 1974. A book accompanying the series giving advice on safer and responsible driving was co-written by him. Hill was also irreverently immortalized on a Monty Python episode ("It's the Arts (or: Intermission)" sketch called "Historical Impersonations"), in which a Gumby appears asking to "see John the Baptist's impersonation of Graham Hill." The head of St. John the Baptist appears (with a stuck-on moustache in Hill's style) on a silver platter, which runs around the floor making putt-putt noises of a race car engine.

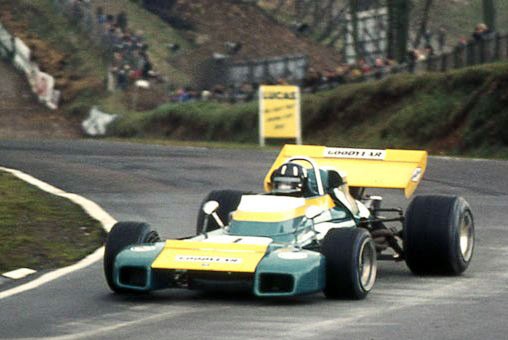
Hill at the 1971 Race of Champions

Hill was involved with four films between 1966 and 1974, including appearances in Grand Prix and Caravan to Vaccarès, in which he appeared as a helicopter pilot. During a Christmas Eve 1970 special of BBC's Tomorrow's World Hill played against Raymond Baxter on an early computer racing game, with data centre workers Anne Norie and Margaret Watson manning the terminals for the game.

Although Hill had concentrated on F1, he also maintained a presence in sports car racing throughout his career (including two runs in the Rover-BRM gas turbine car at Le Mans). As his F1 career drew to a close he became part of the Matra sports car team, taking a victory in the 1972 24 Hours of Le Mans with Henri Pescarolo. This victory completed the so-called Triple Crown of Motorsport which is alternatively defined as winning either:

- the Indianapolis 500 (won by Hill in 1966), the 24 Hours of Le Mans (1972) and the Monaco Grand Prix (1963–65, 1968, 1969), or
- the Indianapolis 500, the 24 Hours of Le Mans and the Formula One World Championship (1962, 1968).

Using either definition, Hill is still the only person ever to have accomplished this feat.

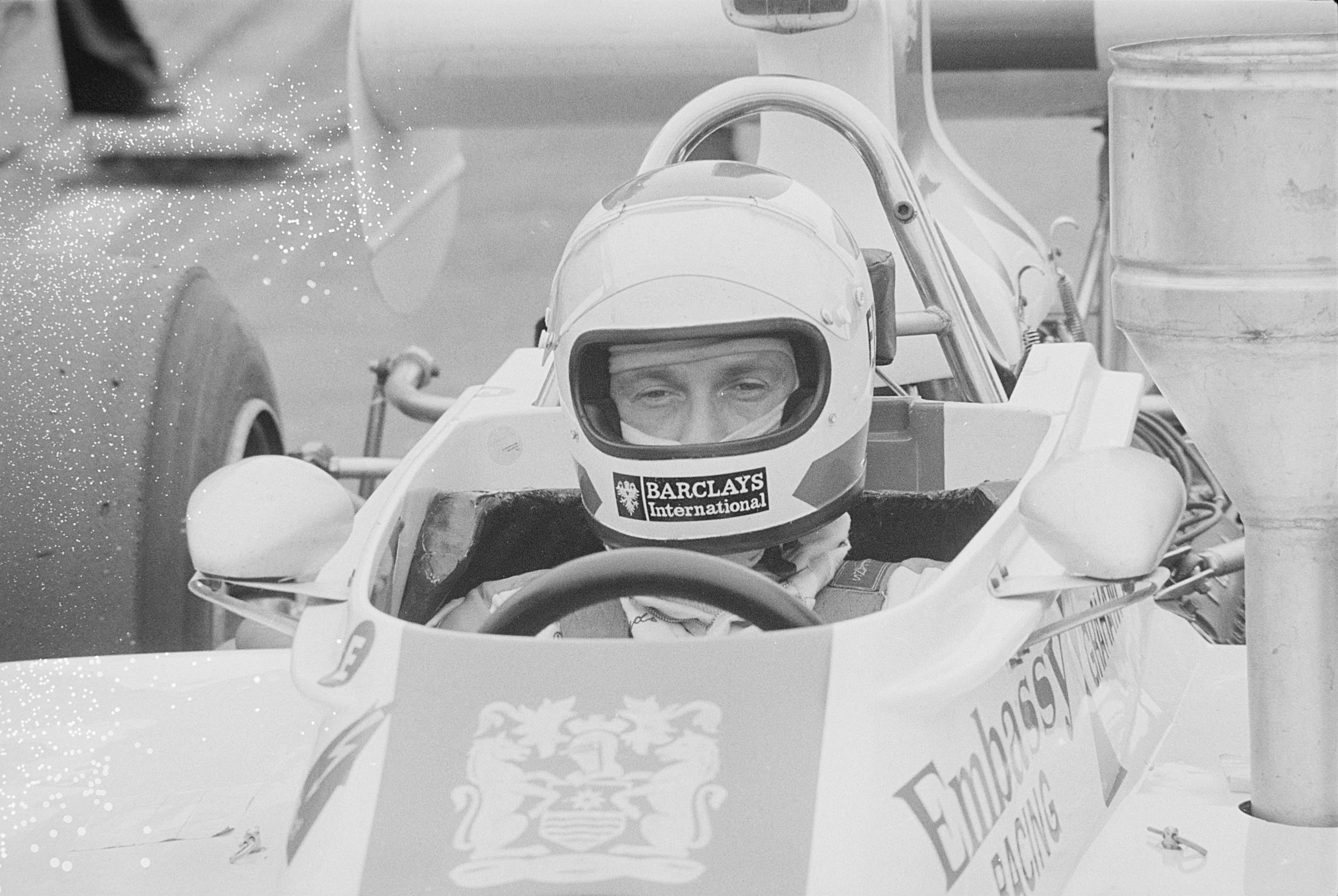
Hill at the 1974 Dutch Grand Prix

Hill set up his own team in 1973: Embassy Hill with sponsorship from Imperial Tobacco. The team used chassis from Shadow and Lola before evolving the Lola into its own design in 1975. After failing to qualify for the 1975 Monaco Grand Prix, where he had won five times, Hill retired from driving to concentrate on running the team and supporting his protege Tony Brise.

Along with Stirling Moss, Hill put his name to and supported the Grand Prix Midget Championship, which started in 1975, with the aim of bringing low cost motorsport to people who wanted to try a new career.

Hill's record of 176 Grand Prix starts remained in place for over a decade until being equalled by Jacques Laffite.

== Family ==
Hill married Bette in 1955; because Hill had spent all his money on his racing career, she paid for the wedding. They had two daughters, Brigitte and Samantha, and a son, Damon, who himself later became Formula One World Champion – the first son of a former world champion to emulate his father.

The family lived in Mill Hill during the 1960s. The house now features an English Heritage blue plaque. During the early 1970s, Hill moved to Lyndhurst House in Shenley in Hertfordshire. The house is now owned by musician Jeff Wayne. Well known for throwing extravagant parties at his houses to which most of the Grand Prix paddock and other famous guests attended, Hill was universally popular.

== Rowing ==
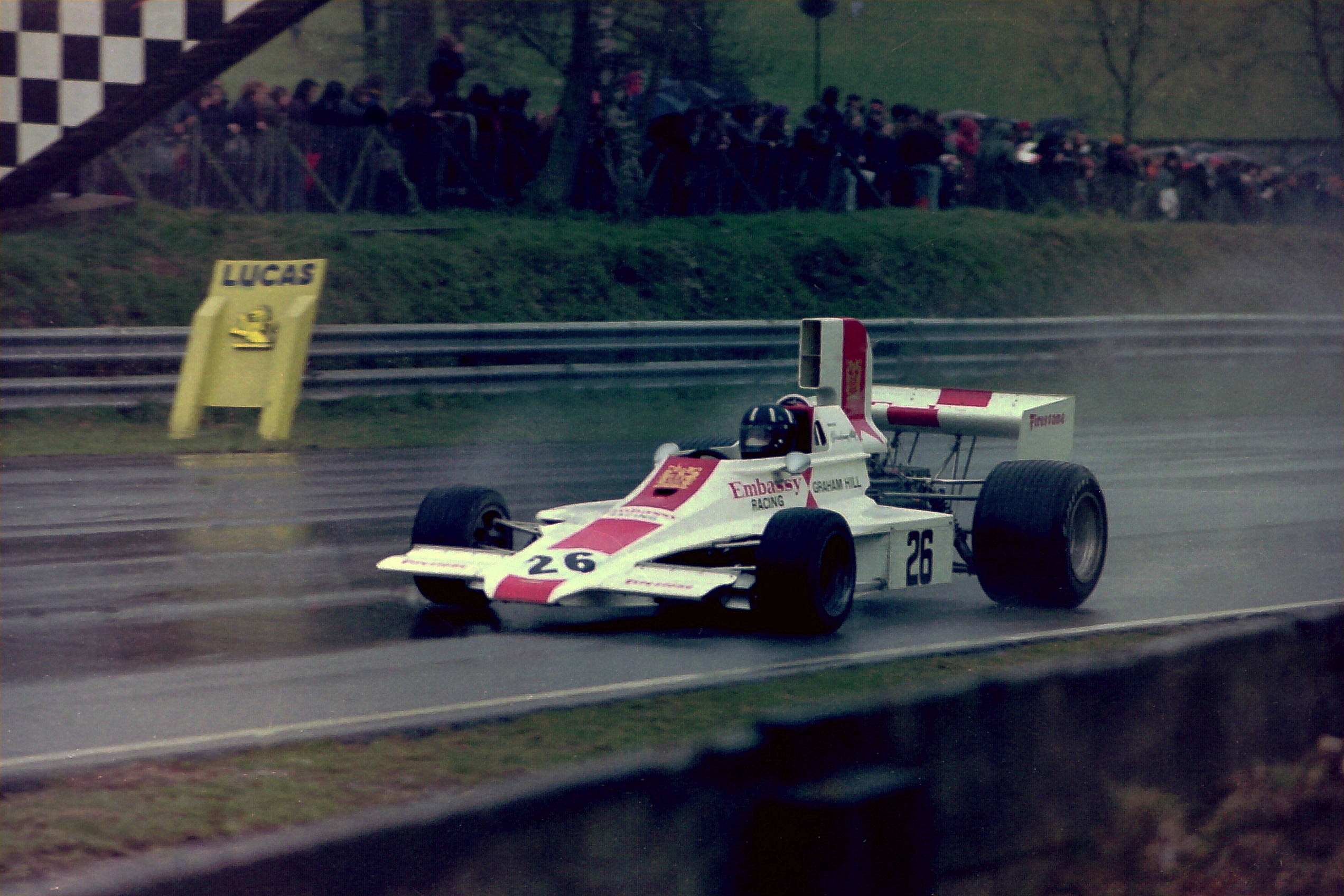
Hill at the 1974 Race of Champions

Before taking up motor racing, Hill spent several years actively involved in rowing. Initially, he rowed at Southsea Rowing Club, while stationed in Portsmouth with the Royal Navy and at Auriol Rowing Club in Hammersmith. He met his future wife Bette at a Boxing Day party at Auriol and, while courting her, he also coached her clubmates at Stuart Ladies' Rowing Club on the River Lea.

In 1952, Hill joined London Rowing Club, then as now one of the largest and most successful clubs in Great Britain. From 1952 to 1954, he rowed in twenty finals with London, usually as stroke of the crew, eight of which resulted in wins. He also stroked the London eight in the highly prestigious Grand Challenge Cup at Henley Royal Regatta, losing a semi-final to Union Sportif Metropolitaine des Transports, France by a length.

Through his racing career, Hill continued to support rowing and London. In 1968, when the club began a financial appeal to modernise its clubhouse, he launched proceedings by driving an old Morris Oxford, which had been obtained for £5, head-on into a boundary wall. Hill made three runs to reduce the wall to rubble, and the car was subsequently sold for £15.

Hill felt that the experience gained in rowing helped him in his motor-racing. He wrote in his autobiography:

"I really enjoyed my rowing. It really taught me a lot about myself, and I also think it is a great character-building sport...The self discipline required for rowing and the 'never say die' attitude obviously helped me through the difficult years that lay ahead."

Hill adopted the colours and cap design of London Rowing Club for his racing helmet – dark blue with white oar-shaped tabs. His son Damon and grandson Josh later adopted the same colours with permission from the club.

== Death ==
Hill died on 29 November 1975 at the age of 46 when his Piper PA-23 Aztec twin-engine light aircraft crashed near Arkley in the London Borough of Barnet, while on a night approach to Elstree Airfield in thick fog. On board with him were five other members of the Embassy Hill team who all died: manager Ray Brimble, mechanics Tony Alcock and Terry Richards, driver Tony Brise, and designer Andy Smallman. The party was returning from a car-testing session at the Paul Ricard Circuit in southern France.

The subsequent investigation revealed that Hill's aircraft, originally registered in the US as N6645Y, had been removed from the FAA register and at the time of the accident was "unregistered and stateless", despite still displaying its original markings. Furthermore, Hill's American FAA pilot certification had expired, as had his instrument rating. His UK IMC rating, which would have permitted him to fly in the weather conditions that prevailed at the time, was also out of date and invalid. Hill was effectively uninsured. The investigation into the crash was ultimately inconclusive, but pilot error was deemed the most likely explanation.

Hill's funeral was held at St Albans Abbey, and he is buried at St Botolph's graveyard, Shenleybury. The church has since been deconsecrated so the tomb now sits in a private garden.

== Legacy ==
After his death, Silverstone village, home to the track of the same name, named a road, Graham Hill, after him and there is a "Graham Hill Road" on The Shires estate in nearby Towcester. Graham Hill Bend at the Brands Hatch racing circuit is also named in his honour. A blue plaque commemorates Hill at 32 Parkside, in Mill Hill, London NW7.

In Bourne, Lincolnshire, where Hill's former team BRM is based, a road called Graham Hill Way is named in his honour. Also, a nursery school in Lusevera, Italy was named in his honour.

== Bibliography ==
- Hill, Graham (1970) [1969]. Life at the limit. Coward-McCann – via Internet Archive.
- Hill, Graham (1970). Kettlewell, Michael (ed.). Graham Hill's motor racing book. Designed and illustrated by Basil Smith. London: Patrick Stephens. ISBN 978-0-85059-055-5 – via Internet Archive.
- Hill, Graham (1971). Kettlewell, Michael (ed.). Graham Hill's car racing guide. Illustrated by Basil Smith. New York: Sterling Pub. Co. ISBN 978-0-8069-0080-3 – via Internet Archive.
- Hill, Graham; Ewart, Neil (1975). Advanced Driving with Graham Hill. Ebury Publishing. ISBN 978-0-09-122780-7.
- Hill, Graham; Ewart, Neil. Graham. Red Fox. ISBN 978-0-09-915250-7.

== Career results ==
=== Career summary ===
Season	Series	Team	Races	Wins	Poles	F/laps	Podiums	Points	Position
1958	Formula One	Team Lotus	9	0	0	0	0	0	NC
1958	24 Hours of Le Mans	Team Lotus	1	0	0	0	0	N/A	DNF
1958	British Saloon Car Championship	Speedwell Stable	1	0	0	0	0	0	NC
1959	Formula One	Team Lotus	7	0	0	0	0	0	NC
1959	24 Hours of Le Mans	Team Lotus	1	0	0	0	0	N/A	DNF
1960	Formula One	Owen Racing Organisation	8	0	0	1	1	4	15th
1960	Formula Two	Porsche KG	2	0	0	0	1	7	7th
1960	24 Hours of Le Mans	Porsche KG	1	0	0	0	0	N/A	DNF
1960	British Saloon Car Championship	Team Speedwell	2	0	0	0	0	0	NC
1961	Formula One	Owen Racing Organisation	8	0	0	0	0	3	16th
1961	24 Hours of Le Mans	North American Racing Team	1	0	0	0	0	N/A	DNF
1961	British Saloon Car Championship	Equipe Endeavour	4	1	0	2	4	28	6th
1962	Formula One	Owen Racing Organisation	9	4	1	3	6	42	**1st**
1962	24 Hours of Le Mans	David Brown Organisation	1	0	0	0	0	N/A	DNF
1962	British Saloon Car Championship	John Coombs	6	4	2	1	5	32	4th
1963	Formula One	Owen Racing Organisation	10	2	2	0	5	29	**2nd**
1963	USAC Championship Car	MT Harvey Aluminum	1	0	0	0	0	0	NC
1963	24 Hours of Le Mans	Owen Racing Organisation	1	0	0	0	0	N/A	DNF
1963	British Saloon Car Championship	John Coombs	7	3	2	3	6	49	**3rd**
1963	British Saloon Car Championship	John Willment Automobiles	1	0	0	0	1	49	**3rd**
1964	Formula One	Owen Racing Organisation	10	2	1	1	5	39	**2nd**
1964	Tasman Series	Scuderia Veloce	2	1	0	0	1	12	6th
1964	24 Hours of Le Mans	Maranello Concessionaires	1	0	0	0	0	N/A	**2nd**
1965	Formula One	Owen Racing Organisation	10	2	4	2	6	40	**2nd**
1965	Tasman Series	Scuderia Veloce	4	1	1	1	1	14	7th
1965	24 Hours of Le Mans	Owen Racing Organisation	1	0	0	0	0	N/A	10th
1966	Formula One	Owen Racing Organisation	9	0	0	0	3	17	5th
1966	Tasman Series	Owen Racing Organisation	5	2	1	2	5	30	**2nd**
1966	USAC Championship Car	Mecom Racing Enterprises	1	1	0	0	1	0	NC (Note: Hill won the 1966 Indianapolis 500.)
1966	24 Hours of Le Mans	Alan Mann Racing	1	0	0	0	0	N/A	DNF
1967	Formula One	Team Lotus	11	0	3	2	2	15	7th
1967	Tasman Series	Team Lotus	1	0	0	0	0	0	NC
1967	USAC Championship Car	Team Lotus	1	0	0	0	1	0	NC
1967	British Saloon Car Championship	Team Lotus	6	0	0	0	2	24	10th
1968	Formula One	Team Lotus	1	0	0	0	1	48	**1st**
1968	Formula One	Gold Leaf Team Lotus	11	3	2	0	5	48	**1st**
1968	Tasman Series	Team Lotus	4	0	0	0	3	17	4th
1968	USAC Championship Car	Team Lotus	1	0	0	0	0	0	NC
1968	British Saloon Car Championship	Alan Mann Racing	1	0	0	0	0	0	NC
1969	Formula One	Team Lotus	10	1	0	0	2	19	7th
1969	Tasman Series	Team Lotus	7	0	0	0	2	16	5th
1969	USAC Championship Car	Team Lotus	0	0	0	0	0	0	NC
1970	Formula One	Rob Walker Racing Team	2	0	0	0	0	7	13th
1970	Formula One	Brooke Bond Oxo Racing – Rob Walker	9	0	0	0	0	7	13th
1971	Formula One	Motor Racing Developments Ltd	11	0	0	0	0	2	21st
1972	Formula One	Motor Racing Developments Ltd	12	0	0	0	0	4	15th
1972	24 Hours of Le Mans	Equipe Matra-Simca Shell	1	1	0	0	1	N/A	**1st**
1973	Formula One	Embassy Racing	12	0	0	0	0	0	NC
1974	Formula One	Embassy Racing with Graham Hill	15	0	0	0	0	1	18th
1975	Formula One	Embassy Racing with Graham Hill	2	0	0	0	0	0	NC

=== Complete Formula One World Championship results ===
(key) (Races in bold indicate pole position, races in italics indicate fastest lap)

Year	Entrant	Chassis	Engine	1	2	3	4	5	6	7	8	9	10	11	12	13	14	15	WDC	Pts
1958	Team Lotus	Lotus 12	Climax FPF 2.0 L4	ARG	MON; Ret	NED; Ret	500	BEL; Ret											NC	0
1958	Team Lotus	Lotus 16	Climax FPF 2.2 L4						FRA; Ret	GBR; Ret		POR; Ret	ITA; 6	MOR; 16					NC	0
1958	Team Lotus	Lotus 16 (F2)	Climax FPF 1.5 L4								GER; Ret								NC	0
1959	Team Lotus	Lotus 16	Climax FPF 2.5 L4	MON; Ret	500	NED; 7	FRA; Ret	GBR; 9	GER; Ret	POR; Ret	ITA; Ret	USA							NC	0
1960	Owen Racing Organisation	BRM P25	BRM P25 2.5 L4	ARG; Ret															15th	4
1960	Owen Racing Organisation	BRM P48	BRM P25 2.5 L4		MON; 7	500	NED; 3	BEL; Ret	FRA; Ret	GBR; Ret	POR; Ret	ITA	USA; Ret						15th	4
1961	Owen Racing Organisation	BRM P48/57	Climax FPF 1.5 L4	MON; Ret	NED; 8	BEL; Ret	FRA; 6	GBR; Ret	GER; Ret	ITA; Ret	USA; 5								16th	3
1962	Owen Racing Organisation	BRM P57	BRM P56 1.5 V8	NED; 1	MON; 6	**BEL**; 2	FRA; 9	GBR; 4	GER; 1	ITA; 1	USA; 2	RSA; 1							**1st**	**42 (52)**
1963	Owen Racing Organisation	BRM P57	BRM P56 1.5 V8	MON; 1	**BEL**; Ret	NED; Ret		GBR; 3	GER; Ret		**USA**; 1	MEX; 4	RSA; 3						**2nd**	**29**
1963	Owen Racing Organisation	BRM P61	BRM P56 1.5 V8				FRA; 3			ITA; 16									**2nd**	**29**
1964	Owen Racing Organisation	BRM P261	BRM P56 1.5 V8	MON; 1	NED; 4	BEL; 5	FRA; 2	GBR; 2	GER; 2	**AUT**; Ret	ITA; Ret	USA; 1	MEX; 11						**2nd**	**39 (41)**
1965	Owen Racing Organisation	BRM P261	BRM P56 1.5 V8	RSA; 3	**MON**; 1	**BEL**; 5	FRA; 5	GBR; 2	**NED**; 4	GER; 2	ITA; 2	**USA**; 1	MEX; Ret						**2nd**	**40 (47)**
1966	Owen Racing Organisation	BRM P261	BRM P60 2.0 V8	MON; 3	BEL; Ret	FRA; Ret	GBR; 3	NED; 2	GER; 4										5th	17
1966	Owen Racing Organisation	BRM P83	BRM P75 3.0 H16							ITA; Ret	USA; Ret	MEX; Ret							5th	17
1967	Team Lotus	Lotus 43	BRM P75 3.0 H16	RSA; Ret															7th	15
1967	Team Lotus	Lotus 33	BRM P60 2.1 V8		MON; 2														7th	15
1967	Team Lotus	Lotus 49	Ford Cosworth DFV 3.0 V8			**NED**; Ret	BEL; Ret	**FRA**; Ret	GBR; Ret	GER; Ret	CAN; 4	ITA; Ret	**USA**; 2	MEX; Ret					7th	15
1968	Team Lotus	Lotus 49	Ford Cosworth DFV 3.0 V8	RSA; 2															**1st**	**48**
1968	Gold Leaf Team Lotus	Lotus 49	Ford Cosworth DFV 3.0 V8		ESP; 1														**1st**	**48**
1968	Gold Leaf Team Lotus	Lotus 49B	Ford Cosworth DFV 3.0 V8			**MON**; 1	BEL; Ret	NED; 9	FRA; Ret	**GBR**; Ret	GER; 2	ITA; Ret	CAN; 4	USA; 2	MEX; 1				**1st**	**48**
1969	Gold Leaf Team Lotus	Lotus 49B	Ford Cosworth DFV 3.0 V8	RSA; 2	ESP; Ret	MON; 1	NED; 7	FRA; 6	GBR; 7	GER; 4	ITA; 9	CAN; Ret	USA; Ret	MEX					7th	19
1970	Rob Walker Racing Team	Lotus 49C	Ford Cosworth DFV 3.0 V8	RSA; 6	ESP; 4														13th	7
1970	Brooke Bond Oxo Racing – Rob Walker	Lotus 49C	Ford Cosworth DFV 3.0 V8			MON; 5	BEL; Ret	NED; NC	FRA; 10	GBR; 6	GER; Ret	AUT							13th	7
1970	Brooke Bond Oxo Racing – Rob Walker	Lotus 72C	Ford Cosworth DFV 3.0 V8										ITA; WD	CAN; NC	USA; Ret	MEX; Ret			13th	7
1971	Motor Racing Developments Ltd	Brabham BT33	Ford Cosworth DFV 3.0 V8	RSA; 9															21st	2
1971	Motor Racing Developments Ltd	Brabham BT34	Ford Cosworth DFV 3.0 V8		ESP; Ret	MON; Ret	NED; 10	FRA; Ret	GBR; Ret	GER; 9	AUT; 5	ITA; Ret	CAN; Ret	USA; 7					21st	2
1972	Motor Racing Developments Ltd	Brabham BT33	Ford Cosworth DFV 3.0 V8	ARG; Ret	RSA; 6														15th	4
1972	Motor Racing Developments Ltd	Brabham BT37	Ford Cosworth DFV 3.0 V8			ESP; 10	MON; 12	BEL; Ret	FRA; 10	GBR; Ret	GER; 6	AUT; Ret	ITA; 5	CAN; 8	USA; 11				15th	4
1973	Embassy Racing	Shadow DN1	Ford Cosworth DFV 3.0 V8	ARG	BRA	RSA	ESP; Ret	BEL; 9	MON; Ret	SWE; Ret	FRA; 10	GBR; Ret	NED; NC	GER; 13	AUT; Ret	ITA; 14	CAN; 16	USA; 13	NC	0
1974	Embassy Racing with Graham Hill	Lola T370	Ford Cosworth DFV 3.0 V8	ARG; Ret	BRA; 11	RSA; 12	ESP; Ret	BEL; 8	MON; 7	SWE; 6	NED; Ret	FRA; 13	GBR; 13	GER; 9	AUT; 12	ITA; 8	CAN; 14	USA; 8	18th	1
1975	Embassy Racing with Graham Hill	Lola T370	Ford Cosworth DFV 3.0 V8	ARG; 10	BRA; 12	RSA; DNQ	ESP												NC	0
1975	Embassy Racing with Graham Hill	Hill GH1	Ford Cosworth DFV 3.0 V8					MON; DNQ	BEL	SWE	NED	FRA	GBR	GER	AUT	ITA	USA		NC	0

=== Complete Formula One non-championship results ===
(key) (Races in bold indicate pole position) (Races in italics indicate fastest lap)

Year	Entrant	Chassis	Engine	1	2	3	4	5	6	7	8	9	10	11	12	13	14	15	16	17	18	19	20	21
1957	Cooper Car Company	Cooper T43 (F2)	Climax FPF 1.5 L4	SYR	PAU	GLV	NAP	RMS	CAE	INT; 13	MOD	MOR												
1958	Team Lotus	Lotus 12	Climax FPF 2.0 L4	GLV; Ret	SYR		INT; 8	CAE																
1958	Team Lotus	Lotus 12 (F2)	Climax FPF 1.5 L4			AIN; 7																		
1959	Team Lotus	Lotus 16	Climax FPF 2.5 L4	GLV; Ret	AIN; 11	INT; Ret	OUL; 5	SIL; Ret																
1960	Owen Racing Organisation	BRM P48	BRM P25 2.5 L4	GLV; 5	INT; 3	SIL; 2	**LOM**; Ret	OUL; 3																
1961	Owen Racing Organisation	BRM P48/57	Climax FPF 1.5 L4	LOM	GLV; 2	PAU	BRX	VIE	**AIN**; 3	SYR; Ret	NAP	LON	SIL; 13	SOL	KAN	DAN	MOD; 7	FLG	OUL; Ret	LEW	VAL	RAN	NAT	RSA
1962	Owen Racing Organisation	BRM P57	BRM P56 1.5 V8	CAP	BRX; DSQ	LOM; 2	LAV	GLV; 1	PAU	AIN; Ret	**INT**; 1	NAP			RMS; 2	SOL				OUL; 2	MEX	RAN; Ret	NAT; NC	
1962	R.R.C. Walker Racing Team	Lotus 18/21	Climax FPF 1.5 L4										MAL; 3	CLP										
1962	R.R.C. Walker Racing Team	Lotus 24	Climax FWMV 1.5 V8														KAN; Ret	MED	DAN					
1963	Owen Racing Organisation	BRM P57	BRM P56 1.5 V8	LOM; 1	**GLV**; 9	PAU	IMO	SYR	AIN; 1	INT; Ret	ROM	SOL	KAN	MED	AUT	OUL; 3	RAN							
1964	Owen Racing Organisation	BRM P261	BRM P56 1.5 V8	DMT; Ret	NWT; Ret	SYR	**AIN**; 2	INT; 2	SOL; Ret	MED														
1964	John Willment Automobiles	Brabham BT11	BRM P56 1.5 V8								RAN; 1													
1965	Owen Racing Organisation	BRM P261	BRM P56 1.5 V8	ROC; Ret	SYR	SMT; 2	**INT**; Ret	MED	RAN															
1966	Owen Racing Organisation	BRM P83	BRM P75 3.0 H16	RSA	SYR	INT	OUL; Ret																	
1967	Team Lotus	Lotus 48 (F2)	Ford Cosworth FVA 1.6 L4	ROC	SPR; 8			OUL; 3																
1967	Team Lotus	Lotus 33	BRM P60 2.1 V8			INT; 4	SYR																	
1967	Team Lotus	Lotus 49	Ford Cosworth DFV 3.0 V8						ESP; 2															
1968	Gold Leaf Team Lotus	Lotus 49	Ford Cosworth DFV 3.0 V8	ROC; Ret	INT; Ret																			
1968	Gold Leaf Team Lotus	Lotus 49B	Ford Cosworth DFV 3.0 V8			**OUL**; Ret																		
1969	Gold Leaf Team Lotus	Lotus 49B	Ford Cosworth DFV 3.0 V8	**ROC**; 2	INT; 7	MAD																		
1969	Roy Winkelmann Racing	Lotus 59B (F2)	Ford Cosworth FVA 1.6 L4				OUL; Ret																	
1970	Rob Walker Racing Team	Lotus 49C	Ford Cosworth DFV 3.0 V8	ROC; 5																				
1970	Brooke Bond Oxo Racing – Rob Walker	Lotus 49C	Ford Cosworth DFV 3.0 V8		INT; 9																			
1970	Brooke Bond Oxo Racing – Rob Walker	Lotus 72C	Ford Cosworth DFV 3.0 V8			OUL; Ret																		
1971	Motor Racing Developments Ltd	Brabham BT34	Ford Cosworth DFV 3.0 V8	ARG	ROC; Ret	QUE; Ret	SPR	INT; 1	RIN	OUL	VIC; 8													
1972	Motor Racing Developments Ltd	Brabham BT37	Ford Cosworth DFV 3.0 V8	ROC	BRA	INT; 7	OUL	REP	VIC; Ret															
1973	Embassy Racing	Brabham BT37	Ford Cosworth DFV 3.0 V8	ROC; Ret	INT																			
1974	Embassy Racing with Graham Hill	Lola T370	Ford Cosworth DFV 3.0 V8	PRE	ROC; NC	INT; Ret																		
1975	Embassy Racing with Graham Hill	Hill GH1	Ford Cosworth DFV 3.0 V8	ROC	INT; 11	SUI																		

=== Complete USAC Championship Car results ===
Year	1	2	3	4	5	6	7	8	9	10	11	12	13	14	15	16	17	18	19	20	21	22	23	24	25	26	27	28	Pos	Points	Ref
1963	TRE	INDY; DNQ	MIL	LAN	TRE	SPR	MIL	DUQ	ISF	TRE	SAC	PHX																	–	0	
1966	PHX	TRE	INDY; 1	MIL	LAN	ATL	PIP	IRP	LAN	SPR	MIL	DUQ	ISF	TRE	SAC	PHX													-	0	
1967	PHX	TRE	INDY; 32	MIL	LAN	PIP	MOS	MOS	IRP	LAN	MTR	MTR	SPR	MIL	DUQ	ISF	TRE	SAC	HAN	PHX	RIV								-	0	
1968	HAN	LVG	PHX	TRE	INDY; 19	MIL	MOS; DNQ	MOS	LAN	PIP	CDR	NAZ	IRP	IRP	LAN	LAN	MTR	MTR	SPR	MIL	DUQ	ISF	TRE	SAC	MCH	HAN	PHX	RIV	-	0	
1969	PHX	HAN	INDY; Wth	MIL	LAN	PIP	CDR	NAZ	TRE	IRP	IRP	MIL	SPR	DOV	DUQ	ISF	BRN	BRN	TRE	SAC	KEN	KEN	PHX	RIV					-	0	

=== Indianapolis 500 results ===
Year	Car number	Start	Qual. speed	Speed rank	Finish	Laps completed	Laps led	Race status	Chassis
1966	24	15	159.243	23	**1st**	200	10	Running	Lola-Ford
1967	81	31	163.317	21	32	23	0	Piston	Lotus-Ford 42/B1
1968	70	2	171.208	2	19	110	0	Crash T2	Lotus – Pratt&Whitney 56/3

Starts	3
Poles	0
Front row	1
Wins	1
Top 5	1
Top 10	1
Retired	2

- Hill failed to qualify the innovative John Crosthwaite (who had worked with Hill at Team Lotus) designed 'roller skate' car for the 1963 Indianapolis 500 race after crashing in practice. Hill, who had been commuting weekly due to other commitments in Europe, would not wait in the U.S. while the car was repaired and risk not qualifying or qualifying badly.
- Hill's 1966 victory marked the first win by a rookie driver since George Souders' 1927 win and the last until Juan Pablo Montoya's visit to Victory Lane in 2000 (Montoya has also emulated Hill's feat of winning both the Indianapolis 500 and the Monaco Grand Prix).
- Hill entered the 1969 Indianapolis 500, but his car (Lotus-Ford Chassis 64/2) was withdrawn during practice along with those of Mario Andretti and Jochen Rindt due to delays rectifying problems associated with hub failure on Andretti's car.

=== Complete Tasman Series results ===
Year	Car	1	2	3	4	5	6	7	8	Rank	Points
1964	Brabham BT4	LEV	PUK	WIG	TER	SAN	WAR; 4	LAK	LON; 1	6th	12
1965	Brabham BT11A	PUK; 1	LEV	WIG	TER	WAR; 5	SAN; Ret	LON; 4		7th	14
1966	BRM P261	PUK; 1	LEV	WIG	TER	WAR; 2	LAK; 1	SAN (3)	LON; 2	2nd	30 (34)
1967	Lotus 48	PUK	WIG	LAK	WAR; Ret	SAN	LON			NC	0
1968	Lotus 49T	PUK	LEV	WIG	TER	SUR; 2	WAR; 2	SAN; 3	LON; 6	4th	17
1969	Lotus 49T	PUK; Ret	LEV; Ret	WIG; 2	TER; 2	LAK; 4	WAR; 11	SAN; 6		5th	16

=== 24 Hours of Le Mans results ===
Year	Team	Co-driver	Car	Class	Laps	Pos.	Class pos.
1958	(United Kingdom) Team Lotus	(United Kingdom) Cliff Allison	Lotus XV-Climax	S 2.0	3	DNF	DNF
1959	(United Kingdom) Team Lotus	(Australia) Derek Jolly	Lotus XV-Climax	S 2.0	119	DNF	DNF
1960	(West Germany) Porsche KG	(Sweden) Jo Bonnier	Porsche 718/4 RS	S 2.0	191	DNF	DNF
1961	(United States) North American Racing Team	(United Kingdom) Stirling Moss	Ferrari 250 GT SWB	GT3.0	121	DNF	DNF
1962	(United Kingdom) David Brown Organisation	(United States) Richie Ginther	Aston Martin DP212	Exp 4.0	78	DNF	DNF
1963	(United Kingdom) Owen Racing Organisation	(United States) Richie Ginther	Rover-BRM	ACO Prize	310	(8th)*	(1st)*
1964	(United Kingdom) Maranello Concessionaires	(Sweden) Jo Bonnier	Ferrari 330P	P 4.0	344	**2nd**	**2nd**
1965	(United Kingdom) Owen Racing Organisation	(United Kingdom) Jackie Stewart	Rover-BRM	P 2.0	284	10th	**2nd**
1966	(United Kingdom) Alan Mann Racing	(Australia) Brian Muir	Ford GT Mk.II	P 7.0	110	DNF	DNF
1972	(France) Equipe Matra-Simca Shell	(France) Henri Pescarolo	Matra-Simca MS670	S 3.0	344	**1st**	**1st**
Sources:

- 1963 Rover-BRM ran for the ACO prize for a gas turbine car covering a minimum of 3600 km, not officially classified.

=== Complete British Saloon Car Championship results ===
(key) (Races in bold indicate pole position; races in italics indicate fastest lap.)

Year	Team	Car	Class	1	2	3	4	5	6	7	8	9	10	11	DC	Pts	Class
1958	Speedwell Stable	Austin A35	A	BRH	BRH	MAL	BRH	BRH	CRY	BRH	BRH; Ret	BRH			NC	0	NC
1960	Team Speedwell	Jaguar Mk II 3.8	+2600cc	BRH	SNE	MAL	OUL	SNE	BRH; Ret*						NC	0	
1960	Team Speedwell	Austin Mini Seven								BRH; Ret	BRH				NC	0	
1961	Equipe Endeavour	Jaguar Mk II 3.8	D	SNE	GOO; 2	AIN	SIL; 1	CRY	SIL; 2	BRH	OUL; 2	SNE			6th	28	**3rd**
1962	John Coombs	Jaguar Mk II 3.8	D	SNE; 3	GOO; 1	**AIN**; 1	SIL; 1	CRY	AIN	BRH; Ret	**OUL**; 1				4th	32	**2nd**
1963	John Coombs	Jaguar Mk II 3.8	D	**SNE**; 2	OUL; 1	**GOO**; 1	AIN; 1	SIL; Ret	CRY; 3†	SIL	BRH; 2	BRH			**3rd**	**49**	**1st**
1963	John Willment Automobiles	Ford Galaxie	D										OUL; 2	SNE	**3rd**	**49**	**1st**
1967	Team Lotus	Ford Cortina Lotus	C	BRH; 2	SNE; 4	SIL; 3	SIL; Ret	MAL	SIL	SIL	BRH; Ret	OUL; Ret†	BRH		10th	24	**2nd**
1968	Alan Mann Racing	Ford Escort TC	C	BRH	THR	SIL	CRY	MAL	BRH	SIL	CRO	**OUL**; Ret	BRH	BRH	NC	0	NC

† Events with 2 races staged for the different classes.

- Car over 1000cc - Not eligible for points.

=== Complete Canadian-American Challenge Cup results ===
(key) (Races in bold indicate pole position) (Races in italics indicate fastest lap)

Year	Team	Car	Engine	1	2	3	4	5	6	Pos	Pts
1966	Team Surtees	Lola T70 Mk.2	Chevrolet	MTR	BRI	MOS	LAG	RIV; 3	LVG	9th	4

== Honours and awards ==
Hill's easy wit and charm helped him become a television personality, notably on the BBC show Call My Bluff with Patrick Campbell and Frank Muir. For a number of years in the early 1970s he appeared as one half of a double act, with Jackie Stewart, as an insert within the BBC Sports Personality of the Year show. In June 1975 he appeared alongside his son, Damon Hill, on the popular television programme Jim'll Fix It. His appearance was later rebroadcast as part of the twentieth anniversary celebrations of the programme in January 1995, with Damon presenting a new segment at the end.

Hill was awarded the Hawthorn Memorial Trophy in 1962 and 1968 for his achievements during the 1962 and 1968 Formula One season. Hill was appointed Officer of the Order of the British Empire (OBE) in the 1968 Birthday Honours for services to motor racing. In 1990, he was inducted into the International Motorsports Hall of Fame.

A one-off BBC Four documentary called Graham Hill: Driven was first broadcast on 26 May 2008.

== See also ==
- Formula One drivers from the United Kingdom

Sporting positions
Preceded by Stirling Moss	BRDC International Trophy; Winner; 1962	Succeeded by Jim Clark
Preceded by Phil Hill	Formula One World Champion; 1962	Succeeded by Jim Clark
Preceded by Jim Clark	Indianapolis 500 Winner; 1966	Succeeded by A. J. Foyt
Preceded by Denny Hulme	Formula One World Champion; 1968	Succeeded by Jackie Stewart
Preceded by Chris Amon	BRDC International Trophy; Winner; 1971	Succeeded by Emerson Fittipaldi
Preceded by Helmut Marko; Gijs van Lennep	Winner of the 24 Hours of Le Mans; 1972; With: Henri Pescarolo	Succeeded by Henri Pescarolo; Gérard Larrousse
Awards
Preceded by Stirling Moss	Hawthorn Memorial Trophy; 1962	Succeeded by Jim Clark
Preceded by Denny Hulme	Hawthorn Memorial Trophy; 1968	Succeeded by Jackie Stewart
Records
Preceded by Jack Brabham; 128 entries, 126 starts (1955 – 1970)	Most Grand Prix entries 179 entries, 176 starts (1958 – 1975), 129th entry at the 1971 Dutch GP; 127th start at the 1971 Monaco GP	Succeeded by Jacques Laffite; 180 entries (176 starts), 180th at the 1986 British GP
