= Graham Hill plane crash =

Fatal aircraft crash in England

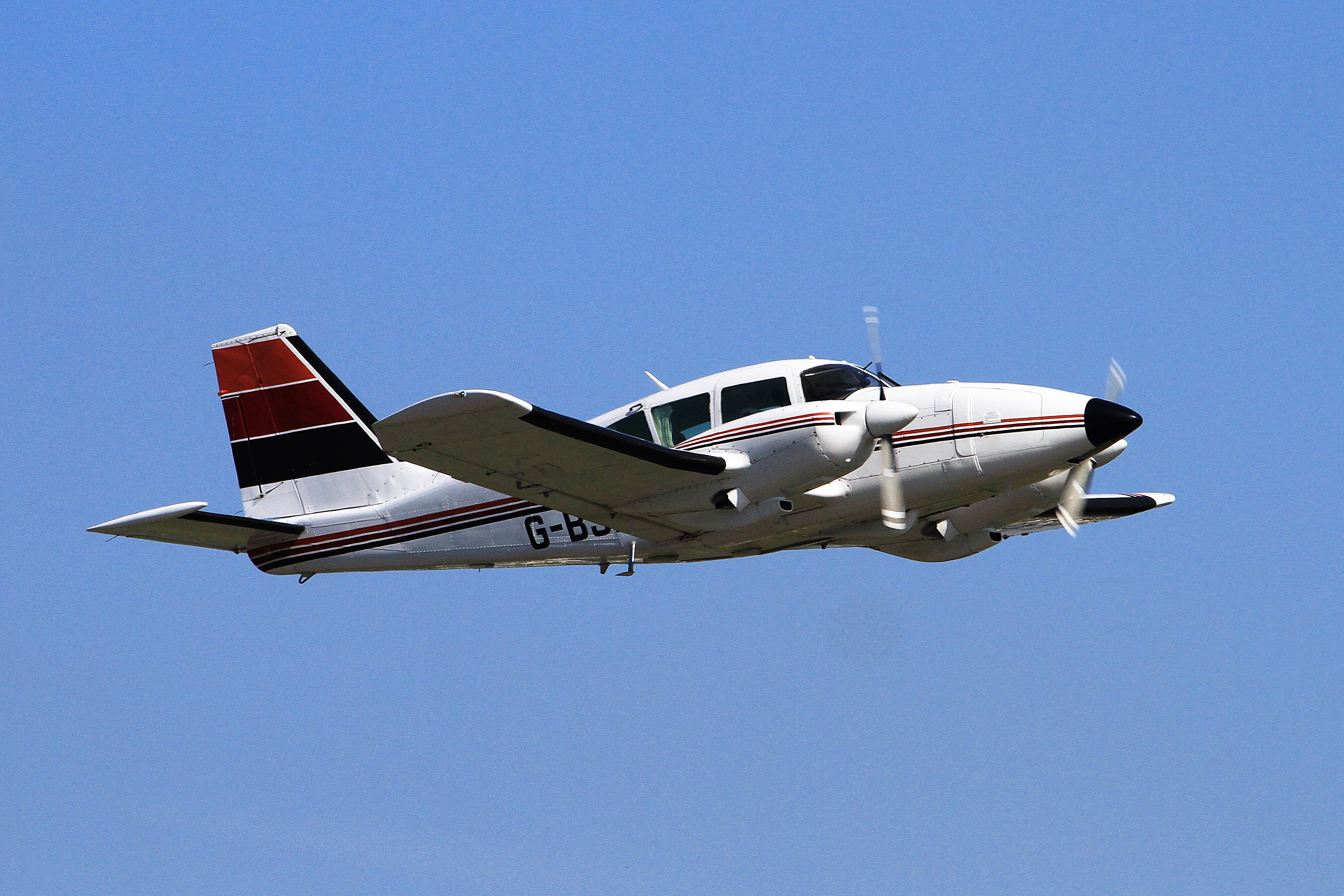
- A Piper PA-23 Aztec similar to the accident aircraft

Accident
- Date: 29 November 1975
- Summary: Controlled flight into terrain
- Site: Arkley, London, England; 51°39′N 0°14′W

Aircraft
- Aircraft type: Piper PA-23-250D Aztec
- Operator: Grand Prix (Bahamas) Ltd
- Registration: Unregistered, displaying N6645Y
- Flight origin: Le Castellet Airport, Var, France
- Stopover: Marseille-Marignane Airport, Bouches-du-Rhône, France
- Destination: Elstree Airfield, Hertfordshire, England
- Occupants: 6
- Passengers: 5
- Crew: 1
- Fatalities: 6
- Survivors: 0

On 29 November 1975, former Formula One champion and Embassy Hill team owner Graham Hill died when the Piper Aztec light aircraft he was piloting crashed near Arkley in the London Borough of Barnet, England, while on approach to Elstree Airfield. The other five passengers on board, forming the core of his Formula One team, were also killed.

The group was returning from a trip to southern France to test the new Hill GH2, one month after the end of the 1975 Formula One season. The accident occurred at night, and at the time foggy conditions prevailed in the area. An investigation into the crash was inconclusive, but pilot error was deemed the most likely explanation.

== Background ==
On 28 November, the day before the accident, Hill had flown his Aztec to Le Castellet Airport, next to the Paul Ricard Circuit in southern France. On board were five other members of the Embassy Hill team: mechanics Tony Alcock and Terry Richards, team driver Tony Brise, team manager Ray Brimble and car designer Andy Smallman.

The group were at the Paul Ricard Circuit testing the team's new Hill GH2 racing car for the 1976 Formula One season. They were scheduled to return on 30 November, but the test was curtailed. Photographer Antony Armstrong-Jones (Lord Snowdon) had considered flying with the group, but did not go as he felt that he had already taken enough photographs.

== Accident ==
At 15:30 GMT on 29 November, the group departed from Le Castellet and flew to Marseille-Marignane Airport. Hill visited the self-briefing room and obtained weather reports for the London area. An IFR flight plan was filed for a flight to Elstree Airfield, with Luton Airport as alternate.

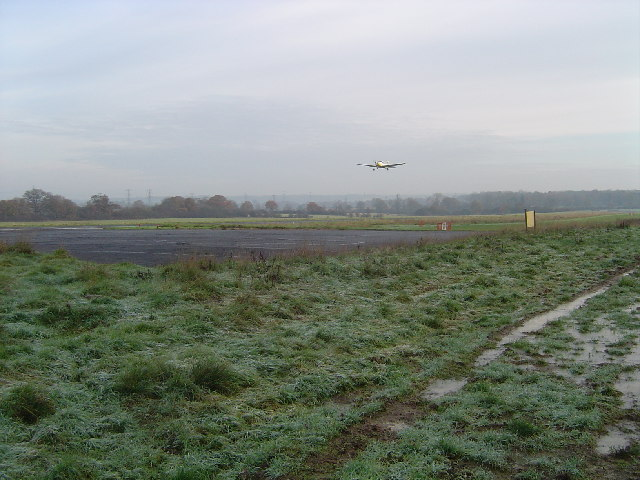
Elstree Aerodrome's runway looking East, 2005

The Piper Aztec took off from Marseille at 17:47. Contact was made with London Air Traffic Control Centre at 20:45 and a weather report for Elstree was obtained, giving a visibility of 2,000 metres and a cloud base of 300 ft AGL. At 21:19, the aircraft was passed to London Heathrow Approach and Hill was informed that visibility at Elstree was 1,000 metres. At 21:21, having descended to 4,000 ft (1,200 m) passing south of Lambourne VOR, Hill was informed that visibility at Elstree had decreased to 800 metres. The aircraft was subsequently cleared to descend to 1,500 ft (460 m), below which any further descent was at the pilot's discretion.

At 21:28, the London Approach controller contacted N6645Y to pass further information; there was no reply. Shortly afterwards, radar contact was lost. The Aztec, with its landing gear and flaps already extended, brushed the top of a large tree at an elevation of 460 ft (140 m) AMSL within Arkley Golf Course, 3 nmi (5.6 km) to the east and 130 ft (40 m) above Elstree airfield. It then descended further, colliding with more trees, rolling to the right, striking the ground with its wing tip and finally crashing into a copse. An intense fire developed after the impact, which destroyed most of the aircraft. All six occupants were instantly killed.

Elstree's runway was equipped with edge lights and a low-intensity visual slope indicator, but lacked any radio aid and there were no published instrument approach procedures for the airfield, making it unsuitable for low-visibility operations. Witnesses near the crash site reported that weather conditions at the time were thick fog, with a visibility of 50 to 100 metres.

Around three hours earlier, a pilot of another light aircraft had attempted three approaches into Elstree, assisted with radar headings and distances to the airfield provided by London Approach. On all three attempts, descending to as low as 300 ft (90 m) AGL, the airfield lights either remained not visible or were spotted too late to proceed with the landing. The pilot eventually diverted to another airport. Visibility above the cloud layer at 1,000 ft (300 m) AMSL, was reported as very good.

== Aircraft ==
The accident aircraft was a Piper PA-23-250D Aztec built in 1968 and registered N6645Y. It was sold by Melridge Aviation in April 1972 to Grand Prix (Bahamas) Ltd and a request was made to remove the aircraft from the FAA register. This did not actually take place until August 1974.

The aircraft was legally stateless from April 1972, although its former registration N6645Y continued to be displayed. The aircraft was operating without a certificate of airworthiness as that held had ceased to be effective when the aircraft was removed from the FAA register. At the time of the accident, the aircraft had flown 1,131 hours.

== Investigation ==
The Accidents Investigation Branch (now Air Accidents Investigation Branch) conducted the investigation. Hill's son Damon was interviewed at Shell Mex House, London as part of the investigation. Their report was published on 29 September 1976. It revealed that the aircraft was unregistered and stateless, although it had been well maintained. It also determined that Hill's night flying and instrument flying ratings had expired and were therefore invalid, as well as other licence irregularities.

No mechanical defects were discovered that would have contributed to the accident. Pilot fatigue was not considered to be a factor, and post-mortem toxicological exams on all six victims were all negative. The exact cause of the accident could not be determined. The investigators offered three possible reasons for the pilot allowing the aircraft to descend into the ground:

1. Error in height interpretation – In the final moments of the flight, the pilot may have misinterpreted the altimeter reading as height above ground (specifically above Elstree Airfield's elevation), as opposed to altitude above mean sea level. This possibility was considered unlikely.
2. Unawareness of altitude – Descending from 1500 ft with clear sky into the underlying layer of fog, the pilot may have focussed his attention on establishing visual contact with the ground, neglecting to monitor the aircraft's instruments to maintain a safe altitude.
3. Error in range estimation – When approaching Elstree's runway 27, a pilot would normally overfly the town of Borehamwood, followed by an unlit patch of land immediately before the airfield. However, N6645Y was approaching the airfield from a more southerly route, and the pilot may have mistaken the lights of Barnet, visible through the fog, for those of Borehamwood, and the adjacent Arkley Golf Course for the dark patch next to the airfield. This may have led him to believe he was much closer to the airfield than he actually was, and to prematurely initiate the final descent to land. This hypothesis was considered the most likely.

== Aftermath ==
The Times reported that Hill may have over-estimated his flying ability. Hill's widow, Bette, was sued for damages by the administrators of Smallman's estate. A High Court writ was issued in June 1977. As Hill was uninsured, settling the case took a large portion of his money.

Because the crash killed the majority of Graham Hill's own Formula One team Embassy Hill (including Hill himself and driver Tony Brise), the team was left with only the deputy team manager Allan Turner and two mechanics as its members. Embassy Hill could not continue to compete and soon the team closed down.

== See also ==
- List of accidents involving sports teams
