= BRM P57 =

BRM P48/57 BRM P578
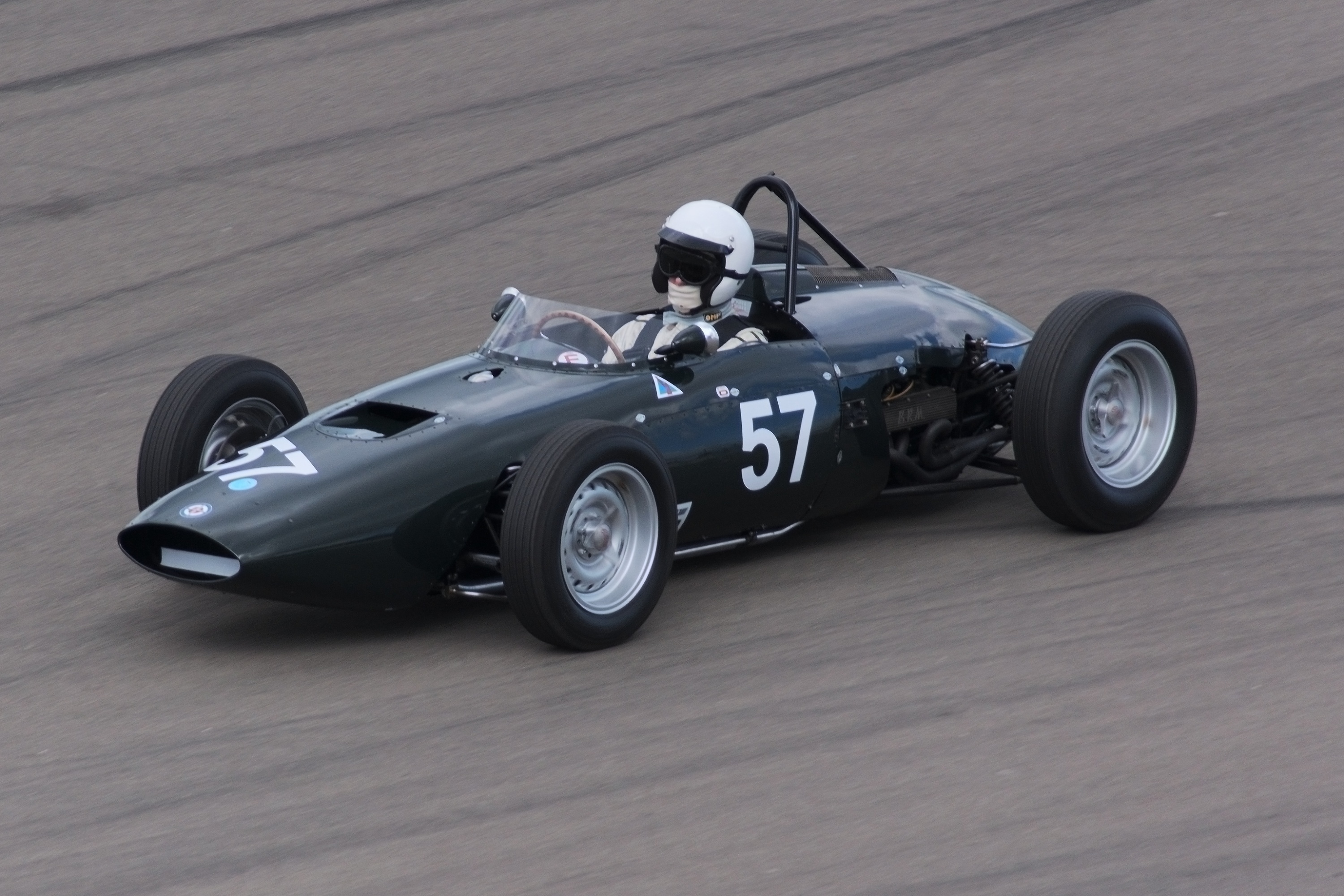
- A BRM P57 in 2014
- Category: Formula One
- Constructor: British Racing Motors
- Designer: Tony Rudd
- Predecessor: P48
- Successor: P61/P261

Technical specifications
- Chassis: spaceframe
- Suspension (front): 1961: double wishbones, coil springs over dampers, anti-roll bar. 1962: IFS Double wishbone, outboard spring/damper.
- Suspension (rear): 1961: double wishbones, coil springs over dampers, anti-roll bar. 1962: IRS with double wishbones, coil springs over dampers, anti-roll bar.
- Engine: 1961: Coventry Climax FPF 1496cc S4 naturally aspirated Mid-engined, longitudinally mounted. 1962: BRM P56 1498cc V8 naturally aspirated Mid-engined, longitudinally mounted.
- Transmission: 1961: 5-speed manual ZF differential. 1962: Colotti, later BRM 6 speed Colotti, 5 speed BRM manual ZF differential
- Tyres: Dunlop

Competition history
- Notable entrants: Owen Racing Organization
- Notable drivers: (United Kingdom) Graham Hill (United Kingdom) Tony Brooks (United States) Richie Ginther
- Debut: 1961 Monaco Grand Prix
- First win: 1962 Dutch Grand Prix
- Last win: 1963 United States Grand Prix
- Last event: 1965 Italian Grand Prix
Races	Wins	Podiums	Poles	F/Laps
40	6	17	3	3
- Constructors' Championships: 1
- Drivers' Championships: 1

The BRM P57 (originally referred in 1961 as the BRM P48/57 and in 1962 as the BRM P578) was a Formula One racing car raced in Formula One from 1962 to 1965.

== Development ==
=== 1961 ===
Like the other British teams, BRM was caught off-guard by new regulations for the 1961 Formula 1 season that limited engines to 1.5 litres. They had a new 1.5 litre V8 engine on the drawing board, but it was not likely to be ready until late in the season. (In the event, it did not race until the next year). The Coventry Climax 4-cylinder unit used by Cooper and Team Lotus was chosen as a stopgap solution. It was installed in the first BRM spaceframe chassis, based on the 1960 BRM P48 Mark II designed by Tony Rudd. The P48 Mark II had abandoned the single rear disc brake introduced by the P25 in favor of a more conventional 2 disc layout at the rear.

At 450 kg, the new BRM P57 was heavier than its British rivals, and the Climax engine was no match for the V6 in the Ferrari 156. The later V8-powered version of the P57 was originally designated the P578, but both types have since been commonly referred to as the P57.

=== 1962 ===
The P578's design can be traced back to the Climax-powered P57 (also called P48/P57) that was raced in 1961. The car's tubular spaceframe and suspension remained unchanged. The underpowered Coventry Climax engine was replaced with BRM's own V8, producing 190 horsepower. Also new for BRM was a Lucas fuel injection system. Although it produced about the same power as the Climax, BRM's unit could run up to 11,000 rpm, some 3,500 rpm faster. Mounted to the back of the engine was Colotti's new 6 speed gearbox. However, reliability problems forced BRM to revert to their own, older specification, 5 speed unit. The original eight exhausts were mounted vertically, but they were prone to working loose and were replaced by a more conventional horizontal layout.

=== 1963 ===
A new model was not prepared in time for the 1963 season. To keep the P57 competitive, a 6 speed gearbox was mounted to the engine, which also featured a new injection system.

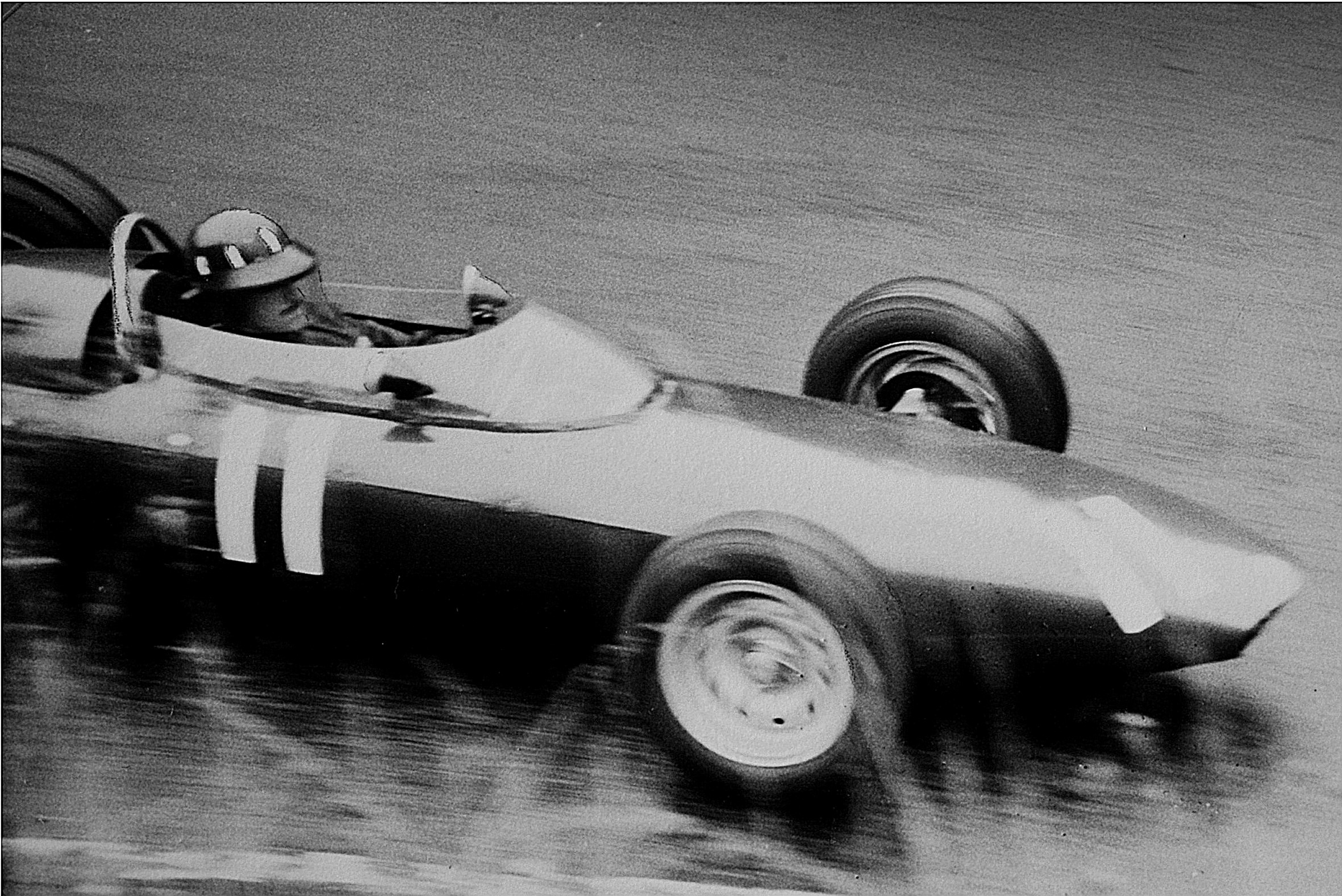
Graham Hill in the P57 at the 1962 German Grand Prix

== Racing history ==
With Joakim Bonnier and Dan Gurney leaving to drive in the 1961 season for the new Porsche team, BRM ran only two cars, for Graham Hill and Tony Brooks. The cars proved able to last for the Grand Prix distance, but they were not competitive. Points were not gained until the fourth race of the season, the French Grand Prix at Reims. Brooks scored a remarkable third and Hill a fifth in the final round, the United States Grand Prix at Watkins Glen, but this result was helped by Scuderia Ferrari having won both championships at Monza and not travelling to the overseas race after the death of Wolfgang von Trips and internal conflicts leading to 'The Great Walkout'. BRM finished 1961 with only 7 points, good for fifth and last of the regular runners in the constructor's championship.

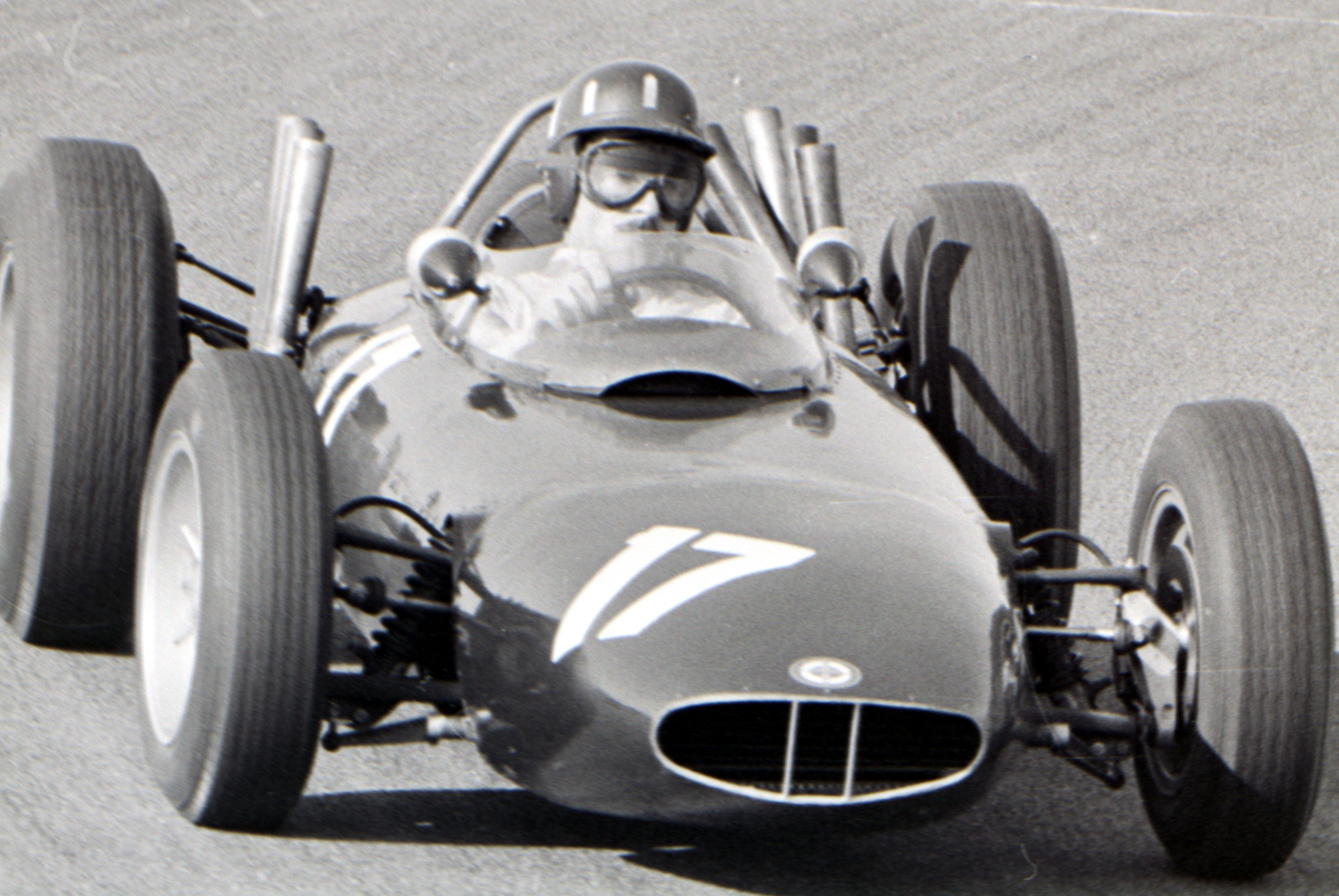
Graham Hill at the 1962 Dutch Grand Prix.

Graham Hill was retained for the following seasons, but Tony Brooks, although only 29 (three years younger than Hill) retired from Formula One, disillusioned with the 1.5 litre cars and with a new motor dealership to run. His replacement was Richie Ginther, a 30 year old American coming off a promising year with Ferrari. The 1962 season began with Graham Hill taking a well-deserved first victory at the 1962 Dutch Grand Prix while defending champion Phil Hill never won a third GP. The championship proved to be a season-long battle between Hill and Jim Clark, driving the revolutionary monocoque Lotus 25, powered by Coventry Climax engines. Clark's Lotus was faster, but Hill's BRM was more reliable. Clark took 6 poles and 3 victories, but only finished in the points 4 times. Hill's BRM remarkably finished every race and won 3 of the last 4 races of the season in Germany, Italy, and South Africa on the way to his first championship. Ginther's year proved disappointing, taking just two podiums and retiring 4 times. With Ginther's underwhelming season only contributing a scratch result, Hill alone outscored the combined results of Clark and the equally underwhelming Trevor Taylor to take also BRM's only constructor's title.

The first race of 1963, the Monaco Grand Prix, looked to be a repeat of the previous year. Clark led from pole before the fragile Lotus broke, handing Hill the first of his five Monaco Grand Prix victories. However, problems with the new gearbox forced Hill to retire from the next two Grands Prix while Clark achieved 4 consecutive wins. Clark won 3 of the last 5 races and stormed to the championship. Hill took another victory in the United States, but it was little consolation. In Germany and Italy, Hill drove BRM's new monocoque P61, but its problems forced BRM to revert to the P57. Hill and Ginther scored a combined 10 podiums, and were 2nd and 3rd in the driver's championship. BRM's 29 points placed them behind only Lotus.

The P261 succeeded the P57 in 1964, but privateers such as Scuderia Centro Sud ran P57s until the end of the 1.5 litre Formula in 1965.

== Complete Formula One World Championship results ==
Year	Entrant	Chassis	Engine	Tyres	Drivers	1	2	3	4	5	6	7	8	9	10	Points	WCC
1961	Owen Racing Organisation	P48/57	Climax FPF 1.5 L4	D		MON	NED	BEL	FRA	GBR	GER	ITA	USA			7	5th
1961	Owen Racing Organisation	P48/57	Climax FPF 1.5 L4	D	Graham Hill	Ret	8	Ret	6	Ret	Ret	Ret	5			7	5th
1961	Owen Racing Organisation	P48/57	Climax FPF 1.5 L4	D	Tony Brooks	13	9	13	Ret	9	NC	5	3			7	5th
1962	Owen Racing Organisation	P57	BRM P56 1.5 V8	D		NED	MON	BEL	FRA	GBR	GER	ITA	USA	RSA		42	1st
1962	Owen Racing Organisation	P57	BRM P56 1.5 V8	D	Graham Hill	1	6	2	9	4	1	1	2	1		42	1st
1962	Owen Racing Organisation	P57	BRM P56 1.5 V8	D	Richie Ginther			Ret	3	13	8	2	Ret	7		42	1st
1962	Owen Racing Organisation	P48/57	BRM P56 1.5 V8	D	Richie Ginther	Ret	Ret									42	1st
1962	Owen Racing Organisation	P48/57	BRM P56 1.5 V8	D	Tony Marsh		DNA	DNA			DNA					42	1st
1962	Owen Racing Organisation	P48/57	BRM P56 1.5 V8	D	Gerry Ashmore			DNA								42	1st
1962	Bruce Johnstone	P48/57	BRM P56 1.5 V8	D	Bruce Johnstone									9		42	1st
1963	Owen Racing Organisation	P57	BRM P56 1.5 V8	D		MON	BEL	NED	FRA	GBR	GER	ITA	USA	MEX	RSA	36^{1}	2nd^{1}
1963	Owen Racing Organisation	P57	BRM P56 1.5 V8	D	Graham Hill	1	Ret	Ret		3	Ret		1	4	3	36^{1}	2nd^{1}
1963	Owen Racing Organisation	P57	BRM P56 1.5 V8	D	Richie Ginther	2	4	5	Ret	4	3	2	2	3	Ret	36^{1}	2nd^{1}
1963	Scuderia Centro Sud	P57	BRM P56 1.5 V8	D	Maurice Trintignant							9				36^{1}	2nd^{1}
1963	Scuderia Centro Sud	P57	BRM P56 1.5 V8	D	Lorenzo Bandini				10	5	Ret					36^{1}	2nd^{1}
1963	Scuderia Centro Sud	P57	BRM P56 1.5 V8	D	Moisés Solana									11		36^{1}	2nd^{1}
1964	Maurice Trintignant	P57	BRM P56 1.5 V8	D		MON	NED	BEL	FRA	GBR	GER	AUT	ITA	USA	MEX	42^{2}	2nd^{2}
1964	Maurice Trintignant	P57	BRM P56 1.5 V8	D	Maurice Trintignant	Ret			11	DNQ	5		Ret			42^{2}	2nd^{2}
1964	Scuderia Centro Sud	P57	BRM P56 1.5 V8	D	Giancarlo Baghetti		10	8		12	Ret	7	8			42^{2}	2nd^{2}
1964	Scuderia Centro Sud	P57	BRM P56 1.5 V8	D	Tony Maggs		DNS	DNS		Ret	6	4				42^{2}	2nd^{2}
1965	Scuderia Centro Sud	P57	BRM P56 1.5 V8	D		RSA	MON	BEL	FRA	GBR	NED	GER	ITA	USA	MEX	45^{2}	2nd^{2}
1965	Scuderia Centro Sud	P57	BRM P56 1.5 V8	D	Lucien Bianchi			12								45^{2}	2nd^{2}
1965	Scuderia Centro Sud	P57	BRM P56 1.5 V8	D	Willy Mairesse			DNS								45^{2}	2nd^{2}
1965	Scuderia Centro Sud	P57	BRM P56 1.5 V8	D	Masten Gregory			Ret		12		8	Ret			45^{2}	2nd^{2}
1965	Scuderia Centro Sud	P57	BRM P56 1.5 V8	D	Roberto Bussinello							DNQ	13			45^{2}	2nd^{2}
1965	Scuderia Centro Sud	P57	BRM P56 1.5 V8	D	Giorgio Bassi								Ret			45^{2}	2nd^{2}

^1 This total includes points scored by the BRM P61
^2 This total includes points scored by the BRM P261
