= BRM P61 =

Formula One racing car

- Category: Formula One
- Constructor: British Racing Motors
- Designer: Tony Rudd
- Predecessor: P57
- Successor: P261

Technical specifications
- Chassis: semi-monocoque
- Suspension (front): Double wishbone, outboard spring/damper.
- Suspension (rear): de Dion tube, with double wishbones, coil springs over dampers, anti-roll bar
- Engine: BRM 56 1498cc V8 naturally aspirated Mid-engined, longitudinally mounted
- Transmission: BRM 6 speed manual ZF differential
- Tyres: Dunlop

Competition history
- Notable entrants: Owen Racing Organization
- Notable drivers: (United Kingdom) Graham Hill
- Debut: 1963 French Grand Prix
Races	Wins	Poles	F/Laps
2	0	0	0
- Constructors' Championships: 0
- Drivers' Championships: 0

The BRM P61 was a Formula One racing car built for the 1963 Formula One season. It was BRM's first attempt at the monocoque design introduced by Lotus a year earlier. Fundamental design issues would mean the car only competed 2 Grands Prix before being garaged in favor of the older, more reliable spaceframe P57. A redesigned monocoque car, dubbed the P261, was introduced for 1964.

== Development ==
After the success of Jim Clark and his Lotus 25 in 1962, BRM began work on their own monocoque car. The P61 was not a true monocoque, a rear subframe was bolted to the front, monocoque half of the car. The subframe housed BRM's type 56 engine, a 1.5 litre V8 and a Colotti gearbox. With approximately 200 horsepower, BRM's V8 rivaled Ferrari for the most powerful engine in F1. BRM's designers, confident in their chassis' rigidity, omitted a rear bulkhead between the driver and engine.

== Racing record ==
The P61's debut came at the French Grand Prix at the hands of champion Graham Hill. Hill stalled at the start and was given a push-start, earning him a 60-second penalty. A lucky Hill would finish the race 3rd, 61 seconds ahead of Jack Brabham. Although the result seemed promising, it immediately became apparent the car suffered from severe chassis flex without a bulkhead. The P61 would not return until Monza, where Hill would retire with clutch problems. Hill's teammate Richie Ginther finished 2nd in the older P57. With no immediate fix to the gearbox and chassis issues, BRM finished out the season with the P57.

== Complete Formula One World Championship results ==
Year	Entrant	Engine	Tyres	Drivers	1	2	3	4	5	6	7	8	9	10	Points	WCC
1963	Owen Racing Organisation	BRM P56 1.5 V8	D		MON	BEL	NED	FRA	GBR	GER	ITA	USA	MEX	RSA	36^{1}	2nd^{1}
1963	Owen Racing Organisation	BRM P56 1.5 V8	D	Graham Hill				3			16				36^{1}	2nd^{1}
1964	Owen Racing Organisation	BRM P56 1.5 V8	D		MON	NED	BEL	FRA	GBR	GER	AUT	ITA	USA	MEX	42^{2}	2nd^{2}
1964	Owen Racing Organisation	BRM P56 1.5 V8	D	A. J. Foyt									DNA	DNA	42^{2}	2nd^{2}
1965	Owen Racing Organisation	BRM P56 1.5 V8	D		RSA	MON	BEL	FRA	GBR	NED	GER	ITA	USA	MEX	45^{2}	2nd^{2}
1965	Owen Racing Organisation	BRM P56 1.5 V8	D	Richard Attwood	DNA										45^{2}	2nd^{2}
1966	Reg Parnell Racing	BRM P56 2.1 V8	D		MON	BEL	FRA	GBR	NED	GER	ITA	USA	MEX		22^{2}	4th^{2}
1966	Reg Parnell Racing	BRM P56 2.1 V8	D	Richard Attwood	DNA										22^{2}	4th^{2}

^1 This total includes points scored by the BRM P57.
^2 All Points scored by the BRM P261
