= Graham Hill: Driven =

- Directed by: Mark Craig
- Narrated by: Tim Block
- Country of origin: United Kingdom

Production
- Executive producer: Mark Stewart
- Running time: 59 minutes
- Production company: Mark Stewart Productions

Original release
- Network: BBC Four
- Release: 26 May 2008

Graham Hill: Driven was a one-off television documentary that chronicled the life of the British motor racing driver Graham Hill.

The documentary was produced by Mark Stewart Productions, and was first shown in front of a private audience of around 60 people, including Hill's widow, daughters and son, on 8 March 2007. Following this, it was sent to a number of television companies to view, with the BBC eventually acquiring rights to show the programme in the UK. its first television showing was on BBC Four on 26 May 2008.

The programme combines archive footage of Hill both racing and making public appearances with contemporary interviews. Home movie footage of Hill at home with his family was also included in the programme. Viewing figures for its first airing were 240,000.

== Critical response ==
Gabrielle Starkey writing for The Times newspaper described the programme as "an evocative profile of Britain's most rakish sportsman". The Independent's Brian Viner described it as an "affectionate documentary" but notes it "did not dwell too much on the flipside of [Hill's] showmanship".

It was one of The Daily Telegraph newspaper's "iPlayer choices", Simon Horsford writing that the programme "touches on what kind of man the free-spirited Hill really was".
