= Elstree Aerodrome =

General aviation aerodrome in Hertfordshire, England

London Elstree Aerodrome
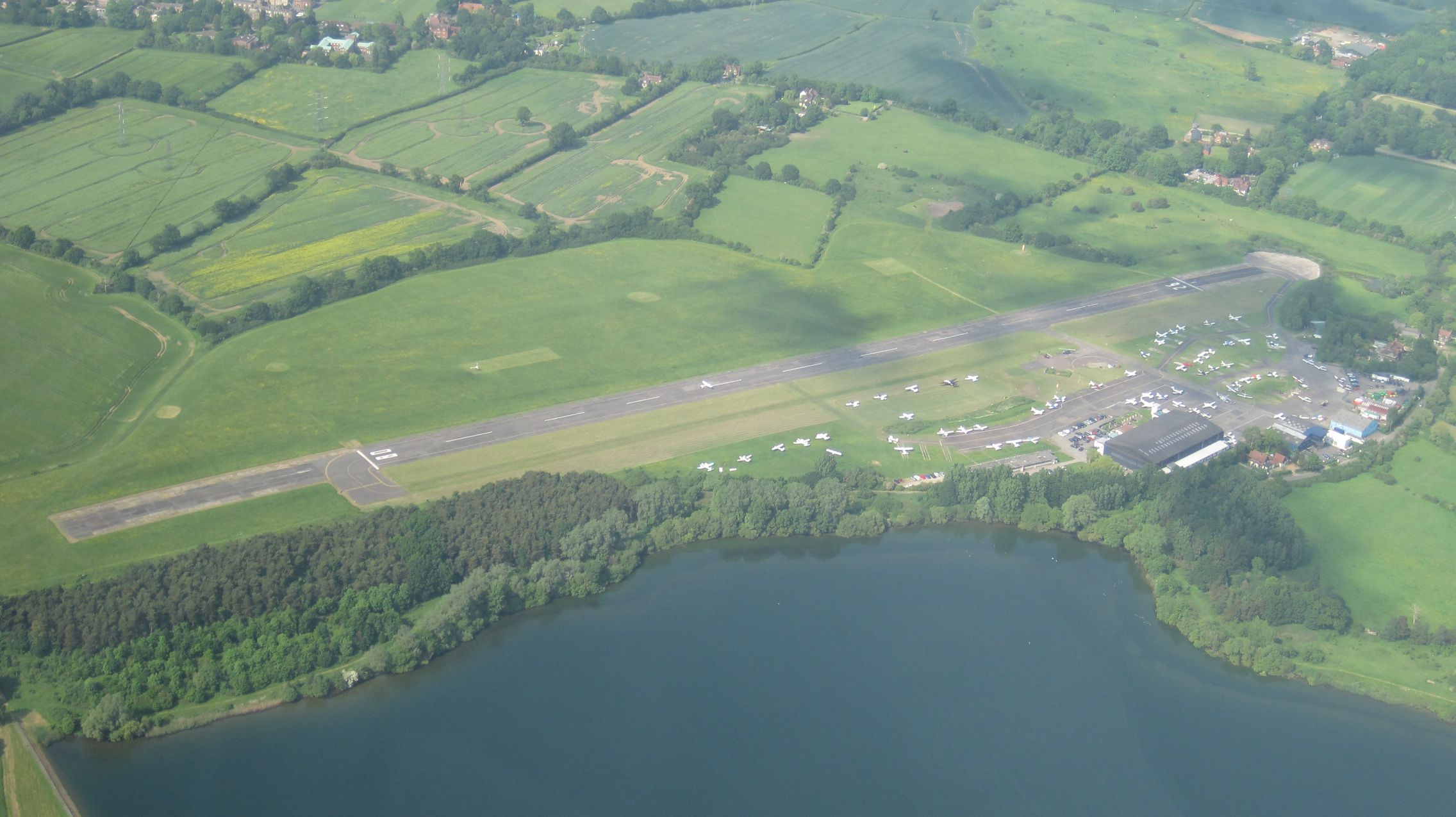
- IATA: none; ICAO: EGTR

Summary
- Airport type: Public
- Owner: Montclare Shipping Co. Ltd
- Operator: Aldenham Aviation LLP
- Serves: Elstree
- Location: Aldenham; Hertfordshire
- Elevation AMSL: 332 ft (101 m)
- Coordinates: 51°39′21″N 000°19′33″W

Map
- Location in Hertfordshire

Runways
Direction	Length		Surface
Direction	m	ft	Surface
08/26	651	2,136	Asphalt
- Sources: UK AIP at NATS

London Elstree Aerodrome (ICAO: EGTR) is a general aviation aerodrome located in Elstree, situated approximately 3 miles (4.8 km) east of Watford, Hertfordshire, England.

Elstree Aerodrome has Civil Aviation Authority Ordinary Licence P486, which allows flights for the purpose of the public transport of passengers and for the purpose of instruction in flying. It is licensed for night flying. The licensee is Montclare Shipping Company Ltd.

The aerodrome has one asphalt runway (08/26) aligned roughly east–west. The runway is 651 meters (2,136 feet) in length making it suitable for most light aircraft up to the size of a King Air or Pilatus PC-12. The runway has a steep 9% gradient.

== History ==
During the Second World War, Westland Lysander aircraft were tested at Elstree. Elstree also hosted a Link Trainer flight simulator. 124 Gliding School was formed at Elstree in August 1943.

The airfield is owned and operated by the Gibbs family, who have long been associated with the Elstree area.

== Operations ==
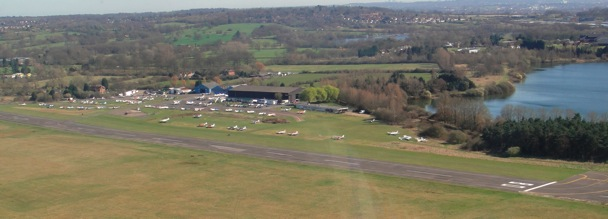
Elstree Airfield seen from the northwest

The aerodrome was returned to civil aircraft operations in 1946. There is a large wartime built Bellman hangar and a number of smaller hangars.

Residents include aeroplane and helicopter schools, charter companies and maintenance services.

Some areas of the airfield are occasionally used for filming.

== Airport information ==
Prior permission (PPR) is required to land. A flight information service for arriving, departing or transiting aircraft is provided by "Elstree Information" on the frequency of 122.405 MHz, and on the same frequency when required under the designation of "Elstree Radio" if the service requires downgrading due to staffing availability.

== Accidents ==
- 29 November 1975: British Formula One champion Graham Hill was killed when the Piper Aztec he was piloting crashed on approach to the airfield in foggy conditions at night, 3 nautical miles (5.6 km; 3.5 mi) east of the runway. The other five occupants of the twin-engine aircraft including driver Tony Brise, all members of the Embassy Hill racing team, were also killed.

== See also ==
- Airports of London - Wikipedia

== Bibliography ==
- Richard Riding and Grant Peerless, Elstree Aerodrome: The Past in Pictures, The History Press Ltd (26 November 2003), ISBN 0-7509-3412-3, ISBN 978-0-7509-3412-1, 192 pages.
