= Mike Crabtree =

British racing driver

- Nationality: (United Kingdom) British

British Saloon Car Championship
- Years active: 1968–1973, 1975
- Starts: 54
- Wins: 0 (7 in class)
- Poles: 0
- Fastest laps: 1 (8 in class)
- Best finish: 4th in 1969

Championship titles
- 1969: British Saloon Car Championship - Class C

Mike Crabtree is a British racing driver who mainly competed in touring cars. In 1969, he finished fourth overall and as champion in Class C in the British Saloon Car Championship. He drove Ford Escorts in other touring car championships in the 1970s. He also competed in endurance events, such as the Spa 24 Hours race, and the European Touring Car Championship.

== Racing record ==
=== Complete British Saloon Car Championship results ===
(key) (Races in bold indicate pole position; races in italics indicate fastest lap.)

Year	Team	Car	Class	1	2	3	4	5	6	7	8	9	10	11	12	13	14	15	Pos.	Pts	Class
1968	John Willment Automobiles	Ford Escort TC	C	BRH	THR	SIL	CRY	MAL	BRH	SIL	CRO	OUL; 8	BRH; 6	BRH; 13					32nd	6	7th
1969	John Willment Automobiles	Ford Escort TC	C	BRH; 5^	SIL; 3	SNE; 5	THR; 11	SIL; 11	CRY; 2†	MAL; Ret†	CRO; 16^	SIL; Ret	OUL; 3	BRH; 2^	BRH; 4				4th	54	**1st**
1970	John Willment Automobiles	Ford Escort TC	C	BRH; Ret^	SNE; 5	THR; 7	SIL; Ret	CRY; 5†	SIL; 6	SIL; 9^	CRO; 7^	BRH; Ret	OUL; 4	BRH; Ret^	BRH				10th	30	**2nd**
1971	John Willment Racing	Ford Escort TC	C	BRH; 6^	SNE; 8	THR; NC	SIL	CRY											9th	32	**3rd**
1971	John Willment Racing	Ford Escort RS1600	C						SIL; Ret	CRO; 4	SIL; 6	OUL; 6	BRH; 4	MAL	BRH; Ret				9th	32	**3rd**
1972	John Willment Racing	Ford Escort RS1600	C	BRH; Ret	OUL; 9	THR; Ret	SIL; Ret	CRY; 4†	BRH; 4	OUL; Ret	SIL; Ret^	MAL; 5†	BRH; Ret						15th	20	4th
1973	John Willment Ltd.	Ford Capri 3000 GT	Group 1	BRH	SIL	THR	THR	SIL	ING	BRH; Ret†*									54th	2	
1973	Research Consultants Ltd.	Chevrolet Camaro	D								SIL; 13^	BRH							54th	2	9th
1975	Hermetite Products	Ford Capri II 3.0s	C	MAL	BRH	OUL	THR; 10	SIL	BRH	THR	SIL	MAL	SNE	SIL	ING	BRH	OUL	BRH	34th	6	10th

† Events with 2 races staged for the different classes.

^ Race with 2 heats - Aggregate result.

- Group 1 car - Not eligible for points.
