= Engemann =

Engemann is a surname of German origin, originating as a surname for someone who lived in a valley. Notable people with the surname include:

- Karl Engemann (born 1930), American record industry executive, producer, and entertainment industry personal manager
- Paul Engemann (born 1953), American former pop musician
- Bret Engemann (born 1977), American football player

== See also ==
- Liane Engeman (1944–2026), Dutch racing car driver
- Engman
- Engelmann
