= Les Nash =

British auto racing driver

- Nationality: (United Kingdom) British

British Saloon Car Championship
- Years active: 1968–1969, 1973–1974
- Starts: 45
- Wins: 0 (6 in class)
- Poles: 0
- Fastest laps: 0 (3 in class)
- Best finish: 6th in 1973

Championship titles
- 1973: British Saloon Car Championship - Class A

Leslie Nash is a British auto racing driver. In 1973, he finished sixth overall and as champion in Class A in the British Saloon Car Championship, driving a Sunbeam Imp that had been driven the previous season by championship winner Bill McGovern.

== Racing record ==
=== Complete British Saloon Car Championship results ===
(key) (Races in bold indicate pole position; races in italics indicate fastest lap.)

Year	Team	Car	Class	1	2	3	4	5	6	7	8	9	10	11	12	13	DC	Pts	Class
1968	Les Nash	Ford Anglia	A	BRH	THR; Ret	SIL; Ret	CRY; Ret†	MAL; 7†	BRH	SIL; 19	CRO ?^	OUL; 19	BRH; 14	BRH; Ret			10th	28	**2nd**
1969	Les Nash	Ford Anglia	A	BRH; 23^	SIL; 27	SNE; 15	THR; 15	SIL; 19	CRY; Ret†	MAL	CRO; 13^	SIL; 15	OUL; 19	BRH; 17^	BRH; Ret		13th	34	4th
1973	Les Nash	Sunbeam Imp	A	BRH; 11	SIL; 12	THR; Ret	THR; Ret	SIL; Ret	ING; 6^	BRH; Ret†	SIL; 15	BRH; 15					6th	39	**1st**
1974	Les Nash	Chevrolet Camaro Z28	D	MAL	BRH; Ret	SIL; Ret	OUL; Ret	THR; Ret	SIL; Ret	THR ?	BRH; Ret	ING; Ret†	BRH; 3†	OUL	SNE; 2†	BRH; Ret	23rd	14	5th

† Events with 2 races staged for the different classes.

^ Race with 2 heats - Aggregate result.
