= Brian Muir (racing driver) =

Australian racing driver (1931–1983)

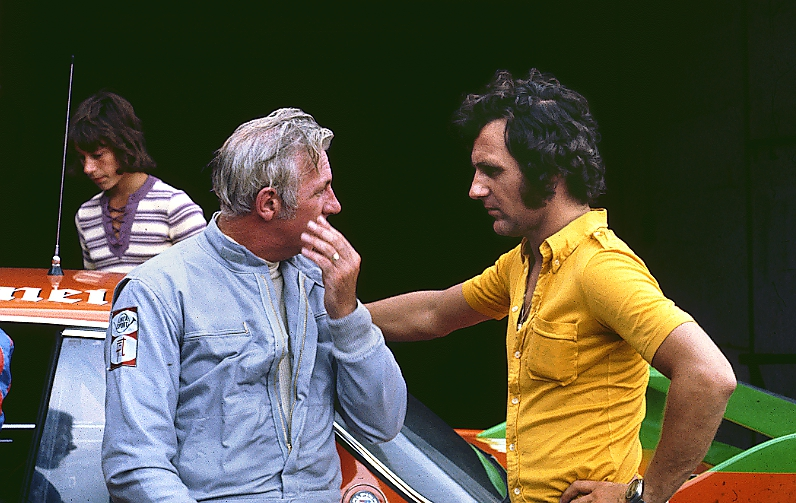
- Muir and Toine Hezemans at Nürburgring in 1973
- Nationality: (Australia) Australian
- Born: 30 June 1931 Sydney, New South Wales, Australia
- Died: 11 September 1983 (aged 52) Silverstone, Northamptonshire, England

British Saloon Car Championship
- Years active: 1966–1973, 1975–1982
- Teams: John Willment Automobiles; Gawaine Baillie; Bill Shaw Racing; Malcolm Gartlan Racing; Biggleswade; Dealer Team BMW; Arian Automotive Developments; Shellsport; Allards of Brixton; Norman Reeves Ltd; Renault Elf; Browne & Day Ltd; Patrick MotorSport
- Starts: 135
- Wins: 22 (2 in class)
- Poles: 15
- Fastest laps: 30
- Best finish: 2nd in 1968, 1971

Championship titles
- 1968, 1971: British Saloon Car Championship - Class D

Brian Muir (30 June 1931 – 11 September 1983) was an Australian racing driver.

== Career ==
Muir achieved successful seasons competing in saloon car racing. In 1965 he finished third overall in the Australian Touring Car Championship. In 1968 he finished as runner-up in the British Saloon Car Championship driving a Ford Falcon behind fellow Australian Frank Gardner. Two years later, he finished third in the BTCC, following up that result with a victory in the RAC Tourist Trophy, the longest running and one of the most prestigious prizes in international motorsport, later that year. He drove a Chevrolet Camaro to the checkered flag, making him the first Australian to claim the trophy. He finished runner-up in the European Touring Car Championship in 1973. He also regularly competed in the 24 Hours of Le Mans driving alongside the likes of Jackie Oliver, Graham Hill and Jacky Ickx, and he won the 1000 km Catalunya in 1968 (with Francisco Godia Sales).

The last race Muir competed in was the RAC Tourist Trophy before dying on his way home.

== Career results ==
Season	Series	Position	Car	Team / Entrant
1964	Australian Touring Car Championship	7th	Holden EH Special S4	Scuderia Veloce
1965	Australian Touring Car Championship	3rd	Holden EH Special S4	Heldon Motors
1968	British Saloon Car Championship	2nd	Ford Falcon Sprint	Bill Shaw Racing
1970	British Saloon Car Championship	3rd	Chevrolet Camaro Z28	Malcolm Gartlan Racing
1972	European Touring Car Championship	12th	Ford Capri RS 2600	Malcolm Gartlan Racing
1972	British Saloon Car Championship	5th	Ford Capri RS 2600	Malcolm Gartlan Racing
1973	European Touring Car Championship	2nd	BMW 3.0 CSL	BMW Alpina
1973	British Saloon Car Championship	5th	BMW 3.0 CSL	Dealer Team BMW

== Racing record ==
=== Complete Australian Touring Car Championship results ===
(key) (Races in bold indicate pole position) (Races in italics indicate fastest lap)

Year	Team	Car	1	Pos.	Pts
1964	Scuderia Veloce	Holden EH Special S4	LAK; Ret	7th	N/A
1965	Heldon Motors	Holden EH Special S4	SAN; 3	**3rd**	N/A

=== Complete British Saloon Car Championship results ===
(key) (Races in bold indicate pole position; races in italics indicate fastest lap.)

Year	Team	Car	Class	1	2	3	4	5	6	7	8	9	10	11	12	13	14	15	Pos.	Pts	Class
1966	John Willment Automobiles	Ford Galaxie	D	SNE; 2	GOO; 1	SIL; Ret	CRY; DNS	BRH; 6	BRH; 4	OUL; Ret†	BRH								10th	22	**2nd**
1967	Gawaine Baillie	Ford Falcon Sprint	D	BRH; Ret	SNE; Ret	SIL; Ret	SIL; DSQ	MAL; 5†	SIL; 3	SIL; 3	BRH; 5	OUL; 3	BRH; 3						10th	24	**3rd**
1968	Bill Shaw Racing	Ford Falcon Sprint	D	**BRH**; 1	THR; 1	**SIL**; 1	**CRY**; 1†	**MAL**; 1†	BRH; Ret	SIL; 2	CRO; Ret	OUL; 1	BRH; 3	BRH; Ret					**2nd**	**58**	**1st**
1969	Malcolm Gartlan Racing	Ford Falcon Sprint	D	BRH; 2	**SIL**; Ret	SNE	THR; 20	SIL	CRY	MAL	CRO	SIL	OUL	BRH					26th	6	5th
1969	Biggleswade	Ford Mustang	D												BRH; 11				26th	6	5th
1970	Malcolm Gartlan Racing	Chevrolet Camaro Z28	D	BRH; 9	SNE; 2	THR; 2	SIL; 2	CRY; 4†	SIL; 1	**SIL**; 1	CRO; 2	BRH; 1	OUL; 2	BRH; 2	**BRH**; 3				**3rd**	**62**	**2nd**
1971	Malcolm Gartlan Racing	Chevrolet Camaro Z28	D	BRH; 2	SNE; 1	**THR**; 1	**SIL**; 1	CRY; 1†	SIL; 2	CRO; 2	SIL; DSQ	**OUL**; 1	BRH; 17	MAL; 1†	BRH; 2				**2nd**	**78**	**1st**
1972	Malcolm Gartlan Racing	Ford Capri RS2600	D	BRH; Ret	OUL; 1	**THR**; Ret	SIL; 2	CRY; 1†	**BRH**; 18	OUL; 4	SIL; Ret	MAL; Ret†	BRH; 2						5th	34	**2nd**
1973	Dealer Team BMW	BMW 3.0 CSL	D	BRH; 4	SIL; 1	THR; 2	**THR**; 2	SIL; Ret	ING	BRH; Ret†	SIL; 3	BRH; 1							5th	40	**2nd**
1975	Arian Automotive Developments	Mazda Savannah RX-3	B	MAL; DNS	BRH; 7	OUL	THR	SIL	BRH	THR	SIL								17th	29	5th
1975	Shellsport	Triumph Dolomite Sprint	B									MAL; Ret†	SNE; Ret		ING; 4†	BRH; 2†	OUL; 2	BRH; 5	17th	29	5th
1975	Adlards of Brixton	Ford Capri 3000 GT	C											SIL; Ret					17th	29	NC
1976	Norman Reeves Ltd	Ford Capri II 3.0s	D	BRH; Ret	SIL; 2	OUL; 3†	THR; Ret	THR	SIL	BRH; Ret	MAL	SNE	BRH						17th	10	6th
1977	Renault Elf	Renault 5 TS	A	SIL ?	BRH; Ret	OUL; Ret†	THR ?	SIL											20th	6	6th
1977	Renault Elf	Renault 5 Alpine	B								SIL; Ret	DON	BRH						20th	6	NC
1977	Brian Muir	Triumph Dolomite Sprint	C						THR; 7	DON				THR ?	BRH				20th	6	5th
1978	Browne & Day Ltd	Ford Capri III 3.0s	D	SIL; DNS	OUL; Ret†	THR	BRH; 5†	SIL	DON; 5†	MAL; 6†	BRH; 2	DON; Ret†	**BRH**; 1	THR; 6	OUL				15th	23	5th
1979	Browne & Day Ltd	Ford Capri III 3.0s	D	SIL; 5	OUL	THR; 4	SIL; Ret	DON	SIL; 3	MAL	DON; 6	**BRH**; 1	THR	SNE	OUL				21st	21	6th
1980	Patrick MotorSport	Ford Capri III 3.0s	D	MAL; Ret†	OUL	THR	SIL												40th	1	12th
1980	Patrick MotorSport	Rover 3500 SD1	D					SIL; 9	BRH; 9	MAL	BRH	THR	SIL; 10						40th	1	12th
1981	Patrick MotorSport	Rover 3500S	D	MAL; Ret†	SIL; Ret	OUL; 7†	THR; 9	BRH; 11†	SIL; Ret	SIL; 15	DON; 4†	BRH; Ret	THR; Ret	SIL; Ret					28th	5	8th
1982	Patrick MotorSport with Duckhams Oil / ICI Petrol	Rover 3500S	D	SIL	MAL	OUL	THR	THR	SIL; 5	DON	BRH; 5	DON; Ret	BRH; 2	SIL; 2					20th	17	7th

† Events with 2 races staged for the different classes.

=== Complete Phillip Island / Bathurst 500 / 1000 results ===
Year	Team	Co-drivers	Car	Class	Laps	Pos.	Class pos.
1960	(United Kingdom) British Motor Corporation	(Australia) Jim Smith	Morris Major	C	160	N/A	5th
1963	(Australia) Heldon Motors	(Australia) Spencer Martin	Holden EH Special S4	C	111	N/A	9th
1964	(Australia) Scuderia Veloce	(Australia) Ron Clarke	Vauxhall Viva HA	A	122	N/A	**2nd**
1968	(Australia) Holden Dealer Racing Team	(Australia) George Reynolds	Holden HK Monaro GTS327	D	127	5th	4th
1978	(Australia) Jack Brabham Holdings	(Australia) Jack Brabham	Holden LX Torana SLR 5000 A9X	A	153	6th	6th
