= Alec Poole =

Irish racing driver (born 1943)

- Nationality: (Republic of Ireland) Irish
- Born: Alexander Kay Poole; 21 May 1943 (age 83) Dublin, Ireland

British Saloon Car Championship
- Years active: 1969, 1973–1974, 1977, 1979
- Teams: Equipe Arden; Nissan Datsun (Japan); Datsun UK; Gerry Edmonds; Team Toyota GB
- Starts: 22
- Wins: 0 (7 in class)
- Poles: 0
- Fastest laps: 6
- Best finish: 1st in 1969

Championship titles
- 1969 1969: British Saloon Car Championship; BSCC - Class A

Alexander Kay Poole is an Irish motor racing driver from Dublin. He competed successfully in saloon and sports car races in Great Britain throughout the 1960s. In 1969 he won the British Touring Car Championship in a privately entered Mini Cooper S. In 1968, he managed a fifteenth place in the 1968 24 Hours of Le Mans, driving for BMC in an Austin-Healey Sprite. He managed a third-place finish in the 1978 24 Hours of Daytona. During the 1990s, he was manager of motorsport for Nissan Europe. He still competes in historic events such as the Goodwood Revival and the Silverstone Classic. As well as driving, he works as commercial director for the Tour Britannia historic racing event organisers.

== Racing record ==
=== Complete British Saloon Car Championship results ===
(key) (Races in bold indicate pole position; races in italics indicate fastest lap.)

Year	Team	Car	Class	1	2	3	4	5	6	7	8	9	10	11	12	13	DC	Pts	Class
1969	Equipe Arden	Austin Mini Cooper S	A	BRH; 14	SIL; 15	SNE; 14	THR; 13	SIL; 16	CRY; 10†	MAL ?†	CRO; 15	SIL; 14	OUL; 17	BRH; 14	BRH		**1st**	**76**	**1st**
1973	Nissan Datsun (Japan)	Datsun Cherry 120A Coupé	B	BRH	SIL	THR	THR	SIL; 9									15th	14	4th
1973	Datsun UK Ltd	Datsun Cherry 120A Coupé	B						ING ?	BRH ?							15th	14	4th
1973	Datsun UK Ltd	Datsun Sunny Coupé GX	B								SIL; 9	BRH					15th	14	4th
1974	Gerry Edmonds	Triumph Dolomite Sprint	B	MAL	BRH	SIL	OUL	THR	SIL	THR	BRH; 13	ING	BRH	OUL	SNE		30th	6	NC
1974	Alec Poole	Hillman Avenger 1600 GT	A													BRH ?	30th	6	8th
1977	Alec Poole	Triumph Dolomite Sprint	C	SIL ?	BRH	OUL	THR	SIL	THR	DON	SIL	DON	BRH	THR			NC	0	NC
1977	Alec Poole	Mini 1275 GT	A												BRH ?		NC	0	NC
1979	Team Toyota GB / Hughes of Beaconsfield	Toyota Celica GT	B	SIL	OUL	THR	SIL; 17	DON	SIL ?	MAL	DON	BRH	THR	SNE	OUL		27th	10	6th

† Events with 2 races staged for the different classes.

Sporting positions
Preceded by Frank Gardner	British Touring Car Champion; 1969	Succeeded by Bill McGovern
