= Bill McGovern =

Bill McGovern may refer to:

- Bill McGovern (American football) (1962–2023), American football coach
- Bill McGovern (racing driver) (born 1937), British former racing driver

== See also ==
- William Montgomery McGovern (1897–1964), American adventurer and political scientist
