= Tom Walkinshaw =

British racing driver (1946–2010)

- Walkinshaw in 2007
- Nationality: (United Kingdom) British
- Born: Thomas Dobbie Thomson Walkinshaw; 14 August 1946 Penicuik, Midlothian, Scotland
- Died: 12 December 2010 (aged 64) Chipping Norton, Oxfordshire, England
- Teams: MG Midget, Team Lotus, Tom Walkinshaw Racing

Championship titles
- Scottish FF1600, European Touring Car Championship

Thomas Dobbie Thomson Walkinshaw (14 August 1946 – 12 December 2010) was a British racing car driver from Scotland and the founder of the racing team Tom Walkinshaw Racing (TWR). He was also involved in professional rugby union, as owner of Gloucester Rugby, and chairman of the team owners organisation for the Aviva Premiership.

== Racing career ==
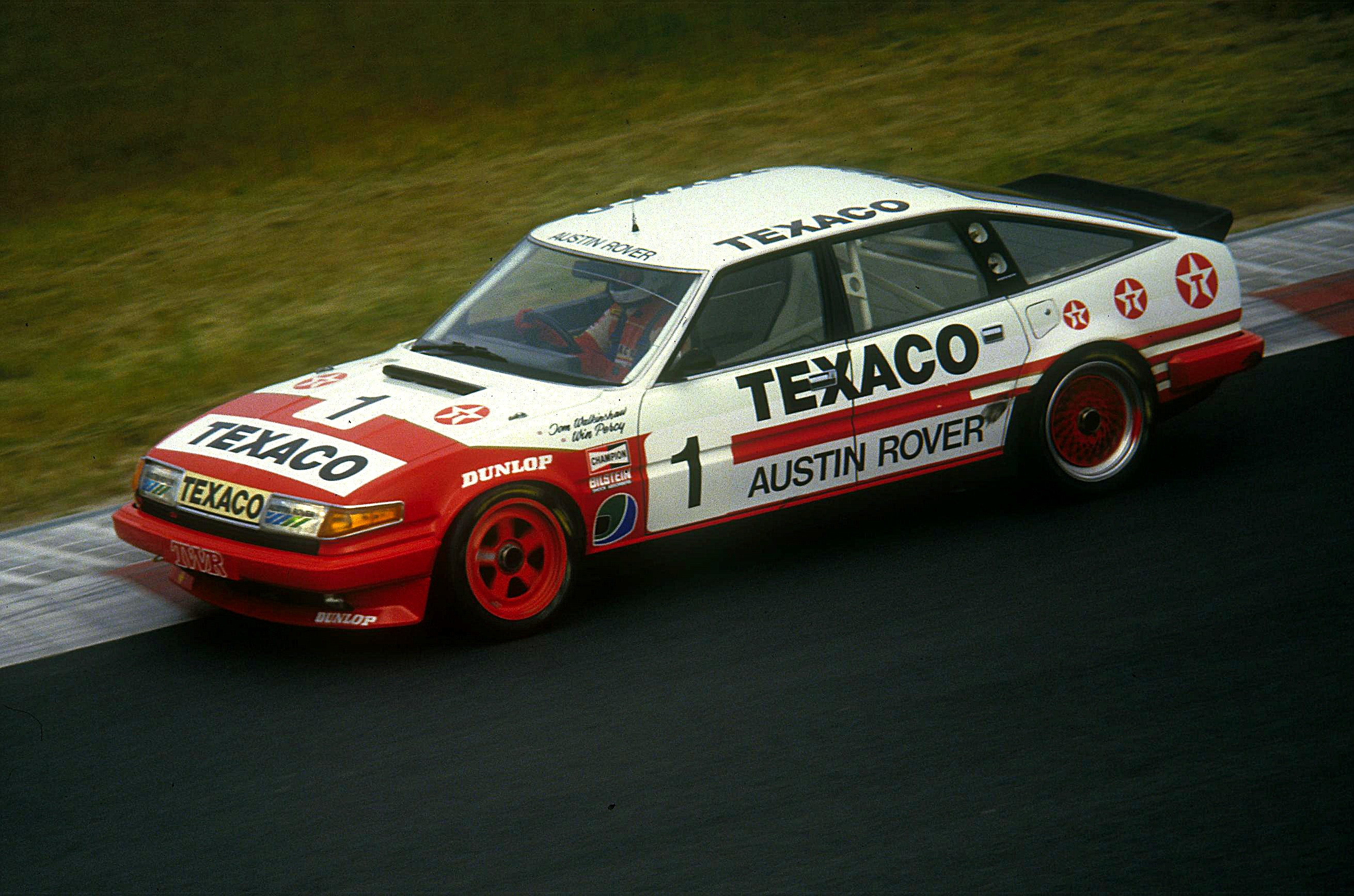
The Rover SD1 of Tom Walkinshaw and Win Percy at the Nürburgring in 1985.

Walkinshaw was born at Mauldslie Farm, near Penicuik, Midlothian, Scotland. He began racing in 1968, starting in an MG Midget, before moving on to a Lotus Formula Ford car. The following year he won the Scottish FF1600 title at the wheel of a Hawke. In 1970, he entered the British Formula Three championship with Lotus. He later moved to the March 'works' team, where he broke his ankle in a racing accident. Continuing his career despite this setback, he drove in many classes, including Formula 5000 and Formula Two.

Ford hired Walkinshaw to drive a Capri on the British Touring Car Championship circuit in 1974. This resulted in him winning his class that year. In 1976, Walkinshaw established Tom Walkinshaw Racing (TWR), continuing to drive for his own team. He competed in the 1976 World Championship for Makes, sharing a Hermetite-sponsored BMW 3.5 CSL with John Fitazpatrick. The pair achieved several good results including a dramatic victory, by just 1.3 seconds, in the Silverstone 6 Hours. In 1984, he won the European Touring Car Championship in a 5.3-litre, V12 Jaguar XJS.

In September 1984, Walkinshaw had teamed up with Australian driver John Goss to drive an Australian Group C spec XJS in the Bathurst 1000. After qualifying in tenth spot, Walkinshaw never left the starting line after transmission failure and was hit from behind by a Chevrolet Camaro. Several cars also joined the crash causing the race to be red flagged and restarted 30 minutes later (the first restart in the race's history).

In 1985, Jaguar retired the XJS from Group A racing and TWR was forced to use the cars they'd been racing in the British Touring Car Championship, the 3.5-litre V8 Rover Vitesse in the European Touring Car Championship. Walkinshaw and Percy won six of the 14 races in the championship but could only finish the championship third behind the Eggenberger Volvo 240T's of Gianfranco Brancatelli and Thomas Lindström.

With Australia's move to Group A in 1985, Walkinshaw vowed to return to Bathurst with his ETCC Jaguars in a bid to win the Australian classic. The three ETCC Jags were brought out of retirement and shipped to Bathurst with the help of "Jaguar Rover Australia" (JRA) and proceeded to dominate practice and qualifying, with Walkinshaw claiming pole position, Jeff Allam claiming second spot on the grid and provisional pole sitter John Goss starting sixth. Driving with regular ETCC co-driver Win Percy, Walkinshaw finished third in the race after leading for over two-thirds distance following a split oil line late in the race. The Allam/Ron Dickson car was out after three laps with engine failure when broken glass from the cars right headlight got sucked into the intake system, while the Goss/Armin Hahne car would win for TWR after having to battle for over 100 laps of the 6.172 km (3.835 mi) long Mount Panorama Circuit with a broken drivers seat which had to be held in place by cable ties attached to the roll cage.

The Rovers, with sponsorship from Bastos/Texaco, were again the TWR cars for the renamed ETCC (which had become the FIATCC in 1986 in anticipation of the 1987 World Touring Car Championship). Walkinshaw was again a favourite to take out the title, but once again would finish third. Co-driver Win Percy was originally announced as the 1986 champion before results from earlier races were amended following protest hearings. Walkinshaw had intended to return to Bathurst in 1986 with the V12 Jaguars but withdrew when JRA refused to help with funds following a downturn in the Australian car market.

With sponsorship from the NZ based Strathmore Group, Walkinshaw took the Jaguars to Japan and New Zealand for the 1986 Fuji InterTEC 500 and the XJS' final race, the 1987 Wellington 500. After some engine work which lifted the V12's power output to 500 hp (373 kW; 507 PS), Walkinshaw proved that the 1984 spec Jags were still competitive in 1986 by qualifying on pole at the fast Fuji circuit in front of the new Nissan Skyline RS DR30s and Holden VK Commodore SS Group As. Walkinshaw comfortably led the race for the first 6 laps from teammate Jeff Allam and Australian Peter Brock in his Holden Dealer Team VK Commodore before retiring with no oil pressure.

After entering into a partnership with Australian car manufacturer Holden in February 1987 (at the expense of Brock's HDT Special Vehicles operation), Walkinshaw fully intended to compete in the inaugural World Touring Car Championship driving a 4.9-litre V8 Holden VL Commodore SS Group A, but withdrew before the first race at Monza in protest at the US$60,000 entrance fee imposed by Bernie Ecclestone who had put in charge of the WTCC by the FIA. Walkinshaw and Jeff Allam appeared with the car at the Nürburgring round of the championship but the car was uncompetitive against the new Ford Sierra RS Cosworths and BMW M3s, retiring with brake problems.

In 1988, TWR developed the Holden VL Commodore SS Group A SV and Walkinshaw again teamed with Jeff Allam at the RAC Tourist Trophy at Silverstone. Although still not a match for the Ford Sierra RS500s, Walkinshaw qualified the Commodore in ninth place. The pair finished the race in 15th place following various problems with the car.

Walkinshaw's last race as a driver was the 1988 Tooheys 1000 at Bathurst. In partnership with Australian Larry Perkins, TWR shipped the ETCC Commodore to Australia for the race as part of the Holden Special Vehicles team. Following a messy lead up to the race, which included Walkinshaw illegally protesting the five leading Australian built Sierras, Walkinshaw and Allam qualified in 13th place (slower than the Perkins Engineering built team car), and was the second retirement after just five laps with rear suspension failure. Walkinshaw himself was cross-entered in the Perkins/Denny Hulme car and drove the car later in the race. The car was retired with engine failure after 137 laps while in second place. Walkinshaw's protest against the Sierras was later found to be illegal because Perkins Engineering was the entrant for the HSV team and not TWR. The stewards of the meeting had erred in letting Walkinshaw lodge the protest under TWR's FIA licence as only a race entrant was entitled to lodge protests under the rules of the meeting. In an ironic twist to Walkinshaw's last race meeting as a driver, the three HSV team cars, including the team's spare car, were found to have illegal modifications to the steering racks after a counter-protest by Dick Johnson Racing team manager Neal Lowe, though no action was taken as the spare car didn't start the race and both race cars failed to finish.

Following the Tooheys 1000, Walkinshaw retired from driving to concentrate on the management of TWR's increasing motorsports portfolio.

== Team management ==
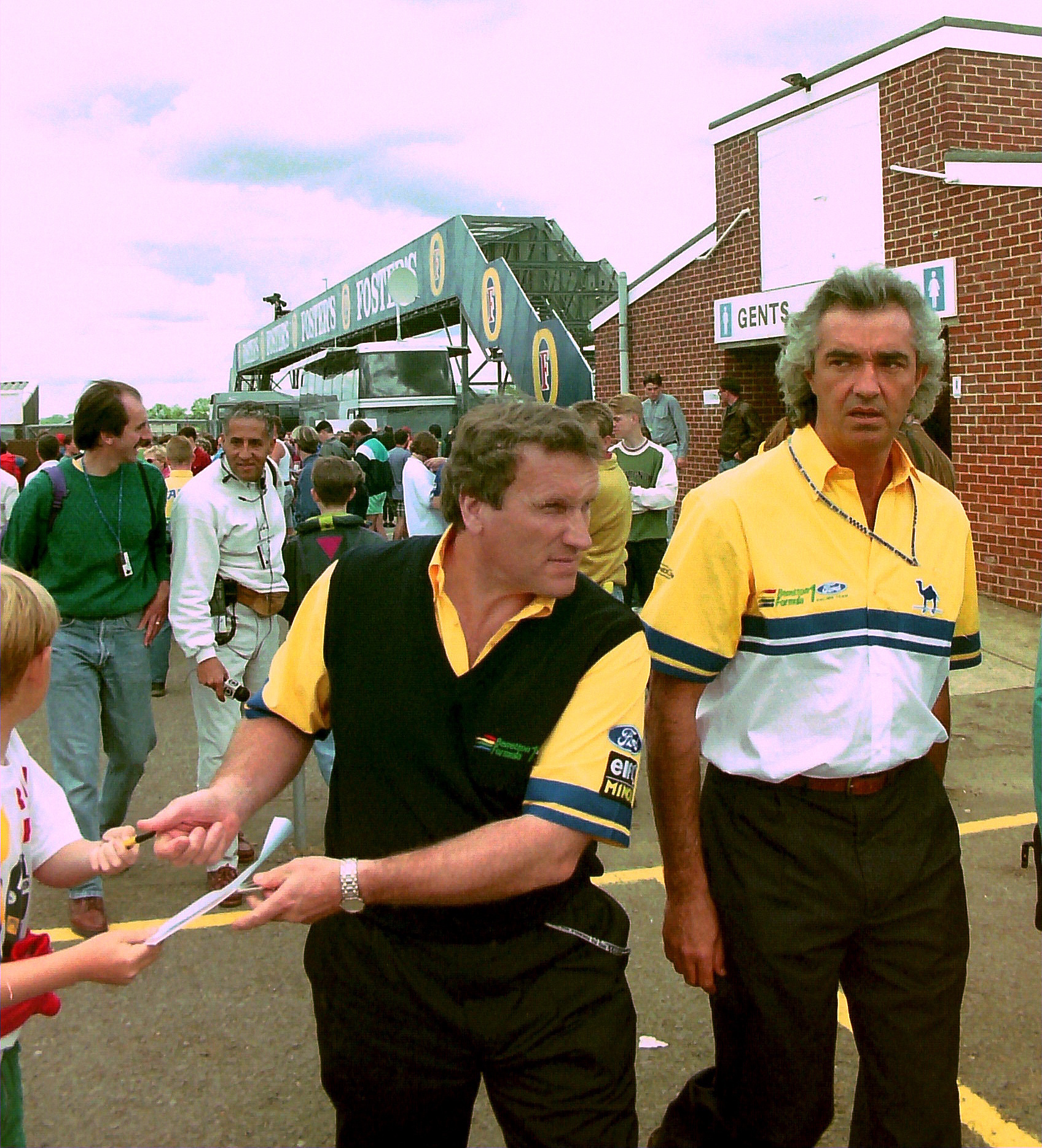
Walkinshaw (left) with Flavio Briatore at the 1993 British Grand Prix

In 1975, Walkinshaw established Tom Walkinshaw Racing (TWR), a group whose business was the manufacture and design of racing and road cars. TWR ran touring car programmes in the mid-1970s and early 1980s. In 1983 the TWR team took eleven wins in eleven races in the British Saloon Car Championship running Rover Vitesses, before being stripped of the title for a technical infringement. TWR also ran a Jaguar XJ-S ETCC touring car programme before taking on their World Sportscar Championship programme. In six years, the programme won Le Mans twice (1988 and 1990) and the World Championships three times (1987, 1988 and 1991). The same team brought engineer Ross Brawn to prominence.

In 1991, Walkinshaw was recruited as engineering director of the Benetton F1 team which subsequently won the 1995 Formula One World Championship. He was involved in the recruitment of Michael Schumacher by Benetton after the German's Formula One debut with the Jordan team. As engineering director, his role also came under scrutiny when the team was investigated for suspected technical infringements during the 1994 season, including the potential use of banned electronic aids and unauthorised modifications to the refuelling apparatus used on the cars. Although illegal software was found in the Benettons, the FIA had no evidence that it had ever been used in a race and no action was taken against the team.

For 1995, Walkinshaw bought 50% of the Ligier team from Benetton team principal Flavio Briatore. His intention was to take over the team completely, but he was unable to purchase 100% of the team and therefore pulled out of the deal. Instead he bought the Arrows team, achieving a coup for the 1997 Formula One season by recruiting reigning world champion Damon Hill to his squad.

In 1997, Walkinshaw was voted Autocar Man of the Year. By this stage the TWR Group employed 1500 employees in the UK, Sweden, Australia and the United States. At the time, Walkinshaw was also managing director of Arrows Grand Prix International.

Walkinshaw's TWR racing group went into liquidation in 2002 after the Arrows team ran out of money. This led to the Australian arm of the operation being bought by Holden. However, since the practice of teams being owned by manufacturers in the Supercars Championship was banned, Holden had to divest the team's assets and sell the Holden Racing Team to lead driver Mark Skaife, and K-Mart Racing (later HSV Dealer Team) to John and Margaret Kelly (the parents of V8 Supercar drivers Todd and Rick).

In 2005, Walkinshaw returned to the V8 Supercars Australia and began a new relationship with his former teams, helping lead Holden to its first series win since 2002 through driver Rick Kelly (2006) and Garth Tander (2007). In late 2006, Walkinshaw Performance bought the small Australian sports car manufacturer Elfin Cars. In 2007, Walkinshaw Performance acquired a 50% stake in the Holden Racing Team, and in 2008 fully re-acquired the team from Skaife. 2009 saw the debut of Walkinshaw Racing a two car operation known individually as Bundaberg Red Racing and Team Autobarn.

== Personal life ==
Walkinshaw died on Sunday 12 December 2010, aged 64, from complications arising from cancer. He is survived by his son Fergus Walkinshaw from his first marriage, and his second wife Martine Walkinshaw and their sons Ryan and Sean. Walkinshaw's memorial service was held at Gloucester Cathedral on 4 February 2011.

Fergus Walkinshaw, who has been racing since 11 years old, inclusive of Ginetta Juniors and GTSupercup, has followed in his fathers footsteps and has restarted TWR in October 2023.

Ryan and Sean followed their father into motorsport, Ryan in management as one of the team principals of the racing team that wears the family name, Walkinshaw Andretti United, the descendant of the Australian arm of Tom Walkinshaw Racing. The team is co-owned by Andretti Autosport and United Autosports and races in the Australian Supercars Championship. Sean as a racing driver who competes regularly in GT racing, competes in the Super Taikyu Series for Hitotsuyama Racing.

== Career summary ==
Results sourced from Driver Database and History of Touring Car Racing.

Season	Series	Position	Car	Team
1970	Shell Super Oil British F3 Championship	26th	March 713M Ford	
1971	Rothmans International Trophy	9th	March 712M Cosworth	Ecurie Ecosse
1971	European Formula Two Championship	NC	March 712M Cosworth	Ecurie Ecosse
1973	European Touring Car Championship Div.2	NC	Datsun Sunny Coupé GX	Datsun UK Ltd.
1973	BP British Formula Atlantic Series	21st	GRD 273 Ford BDA	Myson Racing Team
1973	Yellow Pages British Formula Atlantic Championship	21st	GRD 273 Ford BDA	Myson Racing Team
1974	John Player British Formula Atlantic Series	16th	Modus M3 Ford BDA	
1974	British Saloon Car Championship	4th	Ford Capri 3000 GT	Shellsport
1975	European Formula 5000 Championship	20th	Modus M5 Ford; March 752 Ford	ShellSPORT Team Modus
1976	British Saloon Car Championship	5th	Ford Capri 3000	Team Castrol
1979	British Saloon Car Championship	2nd	Mazda RX-7	Tom Walkinshaw Racing
1981	World Sportscar Championship	39th	Mazda RX-7	Tom Walkinshaw Racing; Mazdaspeed
1982	World Sportscar Championship	70th	Mazda RX-7 254i	Mazdaspeed
1982	European Touring Car Championship	3rd	Jaguar XJS	Tom Walkinshaw Racing
1983	European Touring Car Championship	2nd	Jaguar XJS	Tom Walkinshaw Racing
1984	European Touring Car Championship	1st	Jaguar XJS	Tom Walkinshaw Racing
1984	Australian Endurance Championship	NC	Jaguar XJS	John Goss Racing
1985	Nissan Sport 500 Series	3rd	Rover Vitesse	Tom Walkinshaw Racing
1985	European Touring Car Championship	3rd	Rover Vitesse	Tom Walkinshaw Racing
1985	Australian Endurance Championship	23rd	Jaguar XJS	JRA Ltd / Jaguar Racing
1986	Nissan Mobil 500 Series	6th	Rover Vitesse	Tom Walkinshaw Racing
1986	European Touring Car Championship	3rd	Rover Vitesse	Tom Walkinshaw Racing
1987	World Touring Car Championship	NC	Holden VL Commodore SS Group A	Tom Walkinshaw Racing
1988	European Touring Car Championship	NC	Holden VL Commodore SS Group A SV	Tom Walkinshaw Racing
1988	Asia-Pacific Touring Car Championship	NC	Holden VL Commodore SS Group A SV	Holden Special Vehicles

=== Complete World Sportscar Championship results ===
(key) (Races in bold indicate pole position) (Races in italics indicate fastest lap)

Year	Team	Car	1	2	3	4	5	6	7	8	9	10	11	12	13	14	15	16	DC	Points
1980	JLC Racing	Mazda RX-7	DAY; DNS	BRA	SEB	MUG	MNZ	RIV	SIL	NUR	LMS	DAY	WAT	SPA	MOS	VAL	RAM	DIJ	NC	0
1981	Mazdaspeed Co. Ltd.	Mazda RX-7	DAY	SEB	MUG	MNZ	RIV	SIL; DNS	NUR	LMS; Ret	PUR	DAY	WAT						39th	41
1981	Tom Walkinshaw Racing	Mazda RX-7												SPA; 1	MOS	RAM	BRA		39th	41
1982	Mazdaspeed Co. Ltd.	Mazda RX-7 254i	MNZ	SIL; Ret	NUR; DNA	LMS; Ret	SPA	MUG	FJI; 6	BRA									70th	6

=== Complete British Saloon / Touring Car Championship results ===
(key) (Races in bold indicate pole position – 1973–1990 in class) (Races in italics indicate fastest lap – 1 point awarded ?–1989 in class)

Year	Team	Car	Class	1	2	3	4	5	6	7	8	9	10	11	12	13	14	15	DC	Pts	Class
1972	David Wood Engineering	Ford Escort RS1600	C	BRH	OUL	THR	SIL	CRY	BRH	OUL; Ret	SIL ovr:3 cls:1	MAL ovr:3† cls:2†	BRH; Ret						20th	15	5th
1973	Datsun UK Ltd	Datsun Sunny Coupé GX	B	BRH	SIL	THR	THR	SIL	ING	BRH	SIL ovr:9 cls:2	BRH ovr:13 cls:5							25th	8	7th
1974	Shellsport	Ford Capri 3000 GT	C	MAL; Ret†	BRH ovr:3 cls:2	SIL ovr:7 cls:2	OUL ovr:5 cls:2	THR ovr:? cls:3	SIL ovr:? cls:4	THR ovr:2 cls:1	BRH ovr:3 cls:1	ING ovr:1† cls:1†	BRH ovr:4† cls:1†	OUL ovr:4 cls:1	SNE ovr:4† cls:2†	BRH ovr:3 cls:1			4th	63	**1st**
1974	London Sportscar Centre	Ford Escort RS2000	B									ING ovr:1† cls:1†	BRH; Ret†						4th	63	8th
1975	London Sportscar Centre	Ford Escort RS2000	B	MAL ovr:5† cls:5†	BRH	OUL	THR	SIL ovr:? cls:2	**BRH** ovr:3† cls:3†	THR ovr:10 cls:4	SIL	**MAL**; Ret†	SNE	SIL	ING	BRH ovr:4† cls:4†	OUL	BRH	?	18	6th
1976	Team Castrol	Ford Capri II 3.0s	D	BRH; Ret	**SIL**; Ret	OUL ovr:1† cls:1†	**THR** ovr:1 cls:1	THR ovr:1 cls:1	**SIL** ovr:2 cls:2	**BRH** ovr:6 cls:4	MAL ovr:1† cls:1†	**SNE** ovr:8† cls:5†	BRH ovr:5 cls:2						5th	53	**2nd**
1977	BMW Racing with Castrol	BMW 530i	D	SIL; Ret	BRH ovr:3 cls:2	OUL ovr:4† cls:3†	THR ovr:5 cls:5	**SIL** ovr:6 cls:6	THR ovr:3 cls:2	DON ovr:5† cls:3†	SIL ovr:19 cls:9	DON ovr:3† cls:2†	BRH; DNS	THR ovr:5 cls:4	BRH; Ret				?	?	?
1978	BMW (GB)	BMW 530i	D	SIL	OUL	THR	BRH	SIL	DON; Ret†	**MAL** ovr:2† cls:2†	BRH ovr:3 cls:3	**DON**; Ret†	BRH; Ret	THR; Ret	**OUL** ovr:1† cls:1†				?	?	?
1979	TWR Pentax	Mazda RX-7	C	SIL ovr:4 cls:1	OUL ovr:6† cls:1†	THR ovr:6 cls:1	SIL ovr:2 cls:1	**DON** ovr:7 cls:1	SIL ovr:? cls:5	MAL ovr:7† cls:4†	**DON** ovr:1 cls:1	BRH; DSQ	THR ovr:? cls:1	SNE ovr:3 cls:1	OUL ovr:5† cls:1†				**2nd**	**88**	**1st**
1980	Tom Walkinshaw Racing	BMW 530i	D	MAL	OUL	THR	SIL	SIL; DNS	BRH	MAL	BRH	THR	SIL						NC	0	NC
1982	Team Sanyo Racing with Esso	Rover 3500 S	D	SIL	MAL	OUL	THR; DNS	THR	SIL	DON	BRH	DON	BRH	SIL					NC	0	NC
1985	Tom Walkinshaw Racing	Rover Vitesse	A	SIL	OUL	THR	DON	THR	SIL	DON	SIL	SNE	BRH ovr:1‡ cls:1‡	BRH	SIL				NC	0	NC
1988	Tom Walkinshaw Racing	Holden VL Commodore SS Group A	A	SIL	OUL	THR	DON	THR	SIL	SIL	BRH	SNE	BRH	BIR; C	DON	SIL			NC	0	NC

† Events with 2 races staged for the different classes.

‡ Ineligible to score points.

=== Complete European Touring Car Championship results ===
(key) (Races in bold indicate pole position) (Races in italics indicate fastest lap)

Year	Team	Car	1	2	3	4	5	6	7	8	9	10	11	12	13	14	DC	Points
1973	(United Kingdom) **Datsun UK Ltd**	Datsun Sunny Coupé GX	MNZ	SAL	MAN	NUR	SPA	ZAN	LEC	SIL; 9*							NC	0
1982	(United Kingdom) **Tom Walkinshaw Racing**	Jaguar XJS	MNZ; Ret	**VAL**; 3	DON; Ret	PER	**MUG**; Ret	**BRN**; 1	**SAL**; 2	**NUR**; 1	**SPA**; Ret	**SIL**; 1	ZOL				3rd	107
1983	(United Kingdom) **Tom Walkinshaw Racing**	Jaguar XJS	**MNZ**; 2	VAL; 3	**DON**; 5	**PER**; 1	**MUG**; 3	**BRN**; 1	ZEL; 1	**NUR**; Ret	**SAL**; 1	**SPA**; Ret	SIL; 9	ZOL; 8			2nd	168
1984	**(United Kingdom) Tom Walkinshaw Racing**	Jaguar XJS	**MNZ**; 1	**VAL**; 3	DON; 9	PER; 2	**BRN**; 1	**ZEL**; 1	**SAL**; Ret	NUR; 5	**SPA**; 1	**SIL**; Ret	**ZOL**; 3	MUG; Ret			1st	181
1985	**(United Kingdom) Tom Walkinshaw Racing**	Rover Vitesse	MNZ; 1	**VAL**; 1	**DON**; 1	AND; Ret	BRN; 8	ZEL; Ret	SAL; 2	NUR; Ret	**SPA**; Ret	SIL; 1	NOG; 1	**ZOL**; Ret	EST; Ret	JAR; 1	3rd	198
1986	**(United Kingdom) Tom Walkinshaw Racing**	Rover Vitesse	MNZ; 1	**DON**; 1	**HOC**; 4	MIS; 3	**AND**; 2	BRN; 2	**ZEL**; Ret	**NUR**; 4	**SPA**; Ret	SIL; 3	**NOG**; 16	ZOL; 3	**JAR**; 2	EST; 2	3rd	190
1988	(United Kingdom) **Tom Walkinshaw Racing**	Holden VL Commodore SS Group A SV	MNZ	DON	EST	JAR	DIJ	VAL	NUR	SPA	ZOL	SIL; 15*	NOG				NC	0

- Ineligible to score points.

=== Complete World Touring Car Championship results ===
(key) (Races in bold indicate pole position) (Races in italics indicate fastest lap)

Year	Team	Car	1	2	3	4	5	6	7	8	9	10	11	DC	Points
1987	(United Kingdom) Tom Walkinshaw Racing	Holden VL Commodore SS Group A	MNZ	JAR	DIJ	NUR; Ret	SPA	BNO	SIL	BAT	CLD	WEL	FJI	NC	0

† Not eligible for series points

=== Complete Asia-Pacific Touring Car Championship results ===
(key) (Races in bold indicate pole position) (Races in italics indicate fastest lap)

Year	Team	Car	1	2	3	4	DC	Points
1988	(Australia) Holden Special Vehicles	Holden VL Commodore SS Group A SV	BAT; Ret	WEL	PUK	FJI	NC	0

=== Complete 24 Hours of Le Mans results ===
Year	Team	Co-Drivers	Car	Class	Laps	Pos.	Class Pos.
1976	(United Kingdom) Hermetite Productions Ltd.	(United Kingdom) John Fitzpatrick	BMW 3.5CSL	Gr.5	17	DNF	DNF
1977	(Belgium) Luigi Racing	(Belgium) Eddy Joosen (Belgium) Claude de Wael	BMW 3.0 CSL	IMSA	45	DNF	DNF
1981	(Japan) Mazdaspeed Co. Ltd.	(Japan) Tetsu Ikuzawa (United Kingdom) Peter Lovett	Mazda RX-7	IMSA GTO	107	DNF	DNF
1982	(Japan) Mazdaspeed Co. Ltd.	(United Kingdom) Chuck Nicholson (United Kingdom) Peter Lovett	Mazda RX-7	IMSA GTX	180	DNF	DNF

=== Complete Spa 24 Hour results ===
Year	Team	Co-Drivers	Car	Class	Laps	Pos.	Class Pos.
1974	(United Kingdom) Ford UK/Hermetite	(United Kingdom) John Fitzpatrick	Ford Capri II 3.0	Div. 4	NA	DNF	DNF
1975	(United Kingdom) Hermetite Products	(United Kingdom) John Fitzpatrick	Ford Capri II 3.0	Div. 4	NA	DNF	DNF
1977	(Belgium) Luigi BMW Racing with Castrol	(Italy) Umberto Grano	BMW 530i US	+2500	NA	DNF	DNF
1979	(United Kingdom) Valvoline Racing	(Belgium) Jacques Goujon	Ford Capri III 3.0S	+2500	NA	DNF	DNF
1981	(United Kingdom) Tom Walkinshaw Racing	(Belgium) Pierre Dieudonné	Mazda RX-7	−2500	456	1st	1st
1982	(United Kingdom) Tom Walkinshaw Racing	(United Kingdom) Chuck Nicholson (United Kingdom) Win Percy	Jaguar XJS	Div. 3	9th hour	DNF	DNF
1983	(United Kingdom) Tom Walkinshaw Racing	(Belgium) Pierre Dieudonné	Jaguar XJS	Div. 3	11th hour	DNF	DNF
1984	(United Kingdom) Tom Walkinshaw Racing	(United Kingdom) Win Percy (West Germany) Hans Heyer	Jaguar XJS	Div. 3	453	1st	1st
1985	(United Kingdom) Tom Walkinshaw Racing	(Belgium) Eddy Joosen (United Kingdom) Martin Brundle (Belgium) Marc Duez	Rover Vitesse	Div. 3	366	DNF	DNF
1985	(United Kingdom) Tom Walkinshaw Racing	(United Kingdom) Win Percy (West Germany) Hans Heyer	Rover Vitesse	Div. 3	86	DNF	DNF
1986	(United Kingdom) Tom Walkinshaw Racing	(United Kingdom) Win Percy (Belgium) Eddy Joosen	Rover Vitesse	Div. 3	383	DNF	DNF

=== Complete Bathurst 1000 results ===
Year	Team	Co-Drivers	Car	Class	Laps	Pos.	Class Pos.
1984	(Australia) John Goss Racing	(Australia) John Goss	Jaguar XJS	Group C	0	DNF	DNF
1985	(United Kingdom) JRA Ltd / Jaguar Racing	(United Kingdom) Win Percy	Jaguar XJS	C	160	3rd	3rd
1988	(Australia) Holden Special Vehicles	(United Kingdom) Jeff Allam	Holden VL Commodore SS Group A SV	A	5	DNF	DNF
1988	(Australia) Holden Special Vehicles	(Australia) Larry Perkins (New Zealand) Denny Hulme	Holden VL Commodore SS Group A SV	A	137	DNF	DNF

== Notes ==
Sporting positions
Preceded by Jean-Michel Martin; Philippe Martin	Winner of the Spa 24 Hours; 1981 (with Pierre Dieudonné)	Succeeded by Armin Hahne; Hans Heyer; Eddy Joosen
Preceded by Dieter Quester	European Touring Car Champion; 1984	Succeeded by Gianfranco Brancatelli; Thomas Lindström
Preceded by Thierry Tassin; Hans Heyer; Armin Hahne	Winner of the Spa 24 Hours; 1984 (with Hans Heyer & Win Percy)	Succeeded by Roberto Ravaglia; Gerhard Berger; Marc Surer
Preceded by Hans-Joachim Stuck	Guia Race winner 1984	Succeeded by Gianfranco Brancatelli
