= Liane Engeman =

Dutch racing driver (1944–2026)

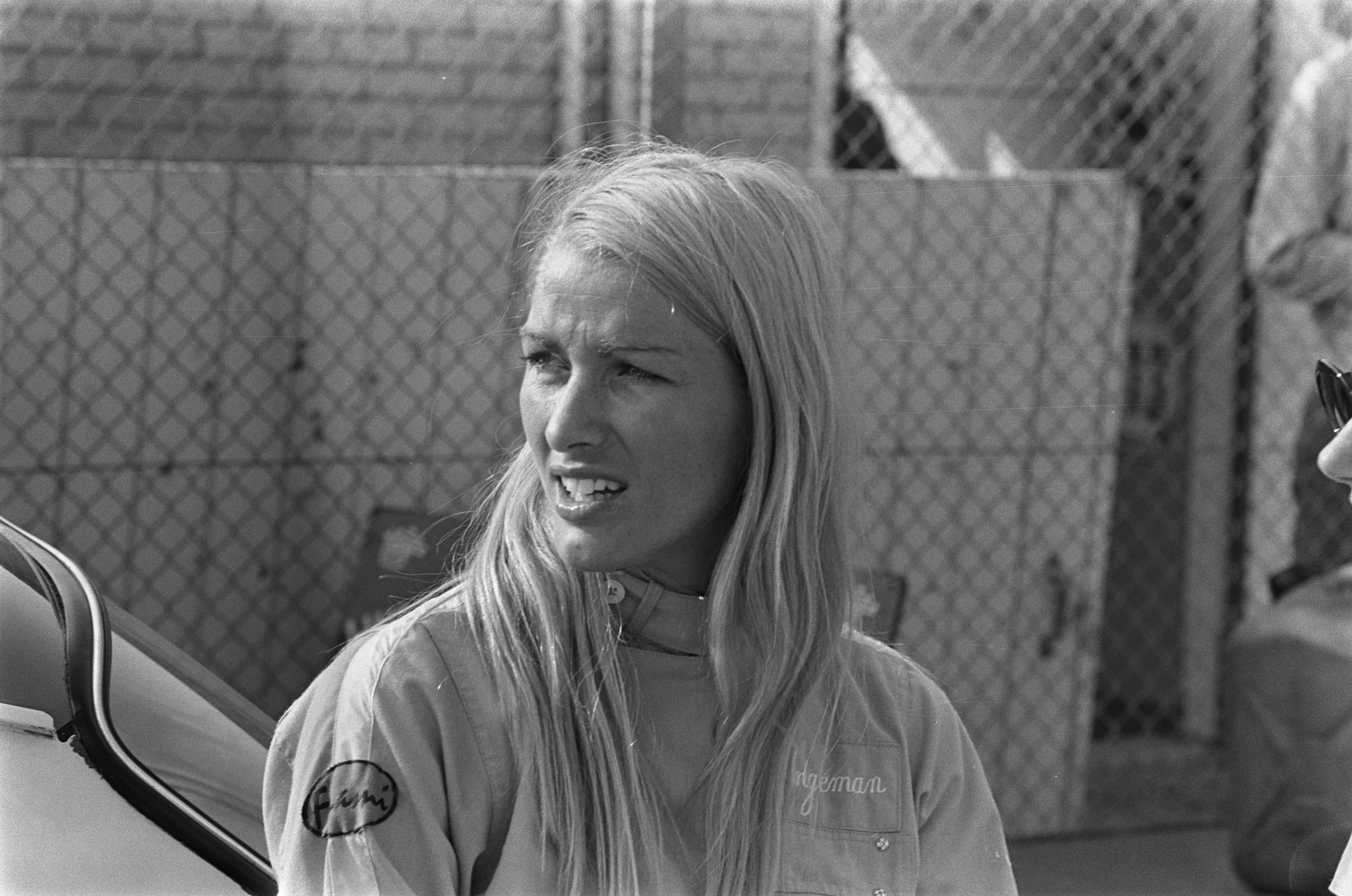
- Engeman in 1970
- Born: 24 March 1944 Haarlem, North Holland, German-occupied Netherlands
- Died: 12 February 2026 (aged 81) Marbella, Spain

British Saloon Car Championship
- Years active: 1966, 1969, 1971
- Teams: H. Wilton; D.J. Bond Racing; Team Radio Veronica
- Starts: 7
- Wins: 0
- Poles: 0
- Fastest laps: 0
- Best finish: 33rd in 1971

Liane Engeman (24 March 1944 – 12 February 2026) was a Dutch racing car driver born in Haarlem, Netherlands. (Note: The Racing Sports Cars website states she was born on 24 March 1947, although an obituary in the Dutch Autosport states that she was 81 at the time of her death, suggesting that she was born in 1944.) Having worked for her father's taxi company in Zandvoort, she could already drive at 15 years old. She was introduced to racing by chance when rally driver Rob Slotemaker offered her a lift while she waited at a bus stop. In 1965, she started racing professionally at Formula Vee in the Netherlands. She then went on to compete in the 1969 British Saloon Car Championship for D.J. Bond Racing, driving a Ford Anglia.

Engeman died in Marbella on 12 February 2026, at the age of 81.

== Racing record ==
=== Complete British Saloon Car Championship results ===
(key) (Races in bold indicate pole position; races in italics indicate fastest lap.)

Year	Team	Car	Class	1	2	3	4	5	6	7	8	9	10	11	12	Pos.	Pts	Class
1966	H. Wilton	Austin Mini Cooper S 970	A	SNE	GOO	SIL	CRY	BRH	BRH	OUL	BRH; Ret^					NC	0	NC
1969	D.J. Bond Racing	Ford Anglia	A	BRH; 19^	SIL	SNE	THR	SIL; 22	CRY; Ret†	MAL	CRO	SIL	OUL	BRH	BRH	35th	4	8th
1971	Team Radio Veronica	Alfa Romeo 1300 GTA Junior	B	BRH	SNE	THR	SIL	CRY	SIL	CRO	SIL	OUL	BRH	MAL	BRH; 10	33rd	4	8th

† Events with 2 races staged for the different classes.

^ Race with 2 heats - Aggregate result.
