= 1970 British Saloon Car Championship =

13th season of the British Touring Car Championship

Seasons
- ← 1969 1971 →

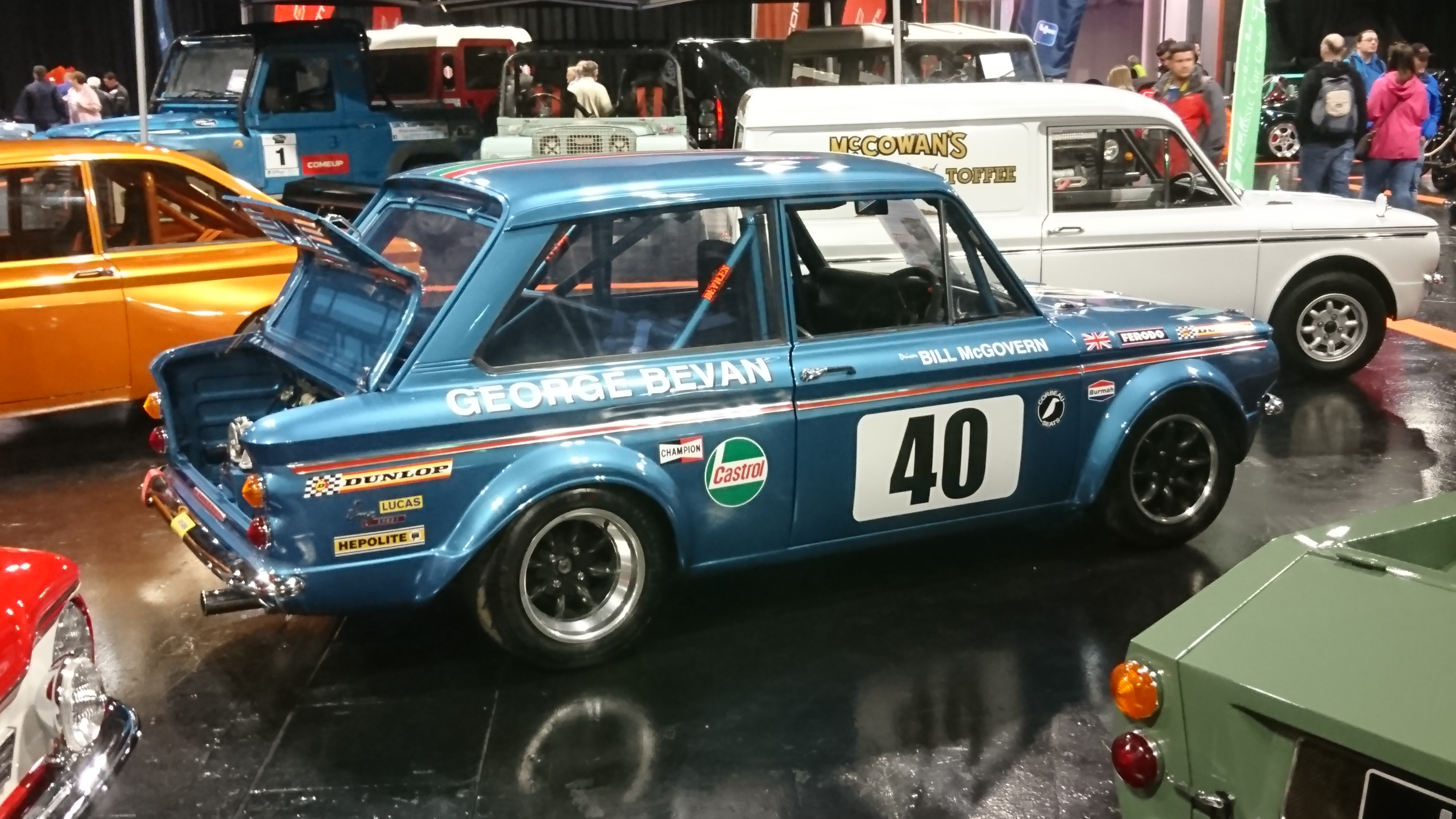
Pictured in 2017, Bill McGovern's Hillman/Sunbeam Imp, the winner of the 1970 British Saloon Car Championship.

The 1970 RAC British Saloon Car Championship, was the 13th season of the series. This year saw the introduction of the new Group 2 regulations. Bill McGovern won his first title, driving a Sunbeam Imp.

== Calendar & Winners ==
All races were held in the United Kingdom. Overall winners in bold.

Round		Circuit	Date	Class A Winner	Class B Winner	Class C Winner	Class D Winner
1		Brands Hatch, Kent	22 March	(United Kingdom) Mike Freeman	(United Kingdom) Richard Longman	(United Kingdom) Chris Craft	(Australia) **Frank Gardner**
2		Snetterton Motor Racing Circuit, Norfolk	27 March	(United Kingdom) Bill McGovern	(United Kingdom) John Fitzpatrick	(United Kingdom) Chris Craft	(Australia) **Frank Gardner**
3		Thruxton Circuit, Hampshire	30 March	(United Kingdom) Bill McGovern	(United Kingdom) John Fitzpatrick	(United Kingdom) Rod Mansfield	(Australia) **Frank Gardner**
4		Silverstone Circuit, Northamptonshire	26 April	(United Kingdom) Bill McGovern	(United Kingdom) Gordon Spice	(United Kingdom) John Hine	(Australia) **Frank Gardner**
5	A	Crystal Palace Circuit, London	25 May	(United Kingdom) Bill McGovern	(United Kingdom) **John Fitzpatrick**	Not contested.	
5	B	Crystal Palace Circuit, London	25 May	Not contested.		(United Kingdom) Chris Craft	(Australia) **Frank Gardner**
6		Silverstone Circuit, Northamptonshire	6 June	(United Kingdom) Bill McGovern	(United Kingdom) Gordon Spice	(United Kingdom) Chris Craft	(Australia) **Brian Muir**
7		Silverstone Circuit, Northamptonshire	27 June	(United Kingdom) Bill McGovern	(Netherlands) Han Akersloot	(Netherlands) Toine Hezemans	(Australia) **Brian Muir**
8		Croft Circuit, North Yorkshire	11 July	(United Kingdom) Bill McGovern	(United Kingdom) John Fitzpatrick	(United Kingdom) Chris Craft	(Australia) **Frank Gardner**
9		Brands Hatch, Kent	18 July	(United Kingdom) Mike Freeman	(United Kingdom) John Fitzpatrick	(United Kingdom) Lawrie Hickman	(Australia) **Brian Muir**
10		Oulton Park, Cheshire	22 August	(United Kingdom) Jeremy Nightingale	(United Kingdom) John Fitzpatrick	(United Kingdom) Mike Crabtree	(Australia) **Frank Gardner**
11		Brands Hatch, Kent	31 August	(United Kingdom) Bill McGovern	(United Kingdom) John Fitzpatrick	(United Kingdom) Chris Craft	(Australia) **Frank Gardner**
12		Brands Hatch, Kent	18 October	(United Kingdom) Mike Freeman	(United Kingdom) Dave Matthews	(United Kingdom) **John Fitzpatrick**	(Republic of Ireland) Martin Birrane

== Championship results ==
Driver's championship
Pos.	Driver	Car	Points
1	(United Kingdom) Bill McGovern	Hillman Imp	72
2	(Australia) Frank Gardner	Ford Mustang Boss 302	68
3	(Australia) Brian Muir	Chevrolet Camaro Z28	62
3	(United Kingdom) John Fitzpatrick	Ford Escort 1300 GT	62
5	(United Kingdom) Chris Craft	Ford Escort Twin Cam	60

Note: Sources vary in listing McGovern’s car as a Hillman Imp or as a Sunbeam Imp.
