= 1969 British Saloon Car Championship =

12th season of the British Touring Car Championship

Seasons
- ← 1968 1970 →

The 1969 BRSCC British Saloon Car Championship, was the twelfth season of the championship. The title was won by Alec Poole in a Mini Cooper S.

== Teams & Drivers ==
Team	Car	Drivers	Class	Rounds
Andrew Mylius Graphics	Hillman Imp	(United Kingdom) Mike Freeman	A	2, 4, 6, 9–10, 12
Bob Fox	Mini Cooper S 970	(United Kingdom) David Buckett	A	2, 9
Bob Fox	Mini Cooper S	(United Kingdom) David Buckett	B	12
D.J. Bond Racing	Ford Anglia	(Netherlands) Liane Engeman	A	1, 5–6
Don Moore	Mini Cooper S 970	(United Kingdom) Rob Mason	A	All
Equipe Arden	Mini Cooper S 970	(Republic of Ireland) Alec Poole	A	1–11
George Bevan Racing	Hillman Imp	(United Kingdom) Bill McGovern	A	12
Ian McDougall	Ford Anglia	(United Kingdom) Gerry Edmonds	A	12
Leonard Ward Racing	Ford Anglia	(United Kingdom) Lawrie Hickman	A	1–2
Leonard Ward Racing	Ford Escort 1.0	(United Kingdom) Lawrie Hickman	A	4–12
Norman & Birch (Hanley) Racing	Hillman Imp	(United Kingdom) Terry Watts	A	2
Team Radio Veronica	Abarth 1000 TCR	(Netherlands) Rein Zwolsman	A	5, 12
Unknown	Ford Anglia	(United Kingdom) Terry McNally	A	2
Unknown	Ford Anglia	(United Kingdom) Les Nash	A	1–6, 8–12
Unknown	Hillman Imp	(United Kingdom) Jeremy Nightingale	A	1, 4–6, 9–10, 12
Unknown	Mini Cooper	(United Kingdom) Colin Youle	A	1–2, 5–6, 10–12
Alan Peer	Ford Escort 1300 GT	(United Kingdom) Roger Taylor	B	3
Alexander Engineering Co.	Mini Cooper S	(United Kingdom) Martin Raymond	B	1–2, 6–7
Britax-Cooper-Downton	Mini Cooper S	(United Kingdom) Steve Neal	B	All
Britax-Cooper-Downton	Mini Cooper S	(United Kingdom) Gordon Spice	B	All
British Leyland Motor Corporation	Mini Cooper S	(United Kingdom) John Handley	B	1–7, 9–11
British Leyland Motor Corporation	Mini Cooper S	(United Kingdom) John Rhodes	B	1–7, 9–11
British Vita Racing	Mini Cooper S	(United Kingdom) Barrie Williams	B	8–12
British Vita Racing	Ford Escort TC	(Finland) Hannu Mikkola	C	12
Cars and Car Conversions	Mini Cooper S	(United Kingdom) Peter Lague	B	1–4, 9, 11
JCB Excavators Ltd.	Mini Cooper S	(United Kingdom) Roger Enever	B	4, 6–8, 10–12
Mini 7 Club	Mini Cooper S	(United Kingdom) Martin Ridehalgh	B	1–2, 4–5, 12
Roger Taylor	Ford Escort 1300 GT	(United Kingdom) Alan Peer	B	1
Roger Taylor	Ford Escort TC	(United Kingdom) Roger Taylor	C	1
Team Broadspeed	Ford Escort 1300 GT	(United Kingdom) Chris Craft	B	All
Team Broadspeed	Ford Escort 1300 GT	(United Kingdom) John Fitzpatrick	B	All
Top Gear Racing of Enfield	Mini Cooper S	(United Kingdom) David Alexander	B	1–2, 9, 11
VMW Motors	Ford Escort 1300 GT	(United Kingdom) Vince Woodman	B	1–3, 10–12
Unknown	Mini Cooper S	(United Kingdom) Jonathan Buncombe	B	1–2, 4–8, 10–12
Unknown	Mini Cooper S	(United Kingdom) Brian Chatfield	B	4
Unknown	Mini Cooper S	(United Kingdom) Ken Costello	B	1, 3, 11
Unknown	Mini Cooper S	(United Kingdom) Desmond Gibb	B	5, 8
Unknown	Mini Cooper S	(United Kingdom) Terry Harmer	B	1
Unknown	Mini Cooper S	(United Kingdom) Bob Jones	B	12
Unknown	Mini Cooper S	(United Kingdom) Geoff Mabbs	B	5
Unknown	Mini Cooper S	(United Kingdom) Mac Ross	B	1–2
A.G. Dean (Racing) Ltd.	Ford Lotus Cortina	(United Kingdom) Tony Dean	C	1–2
A.G. Dean (Racing) Ltd.	Ford Escort TC	(United Kingdom) Brian Robinson	C	1–2
Alpina	BMW 2002 TI	(Austria) Dieter Quester	C	3–4
Byker Hill Garage Ltd.	Ford Escort TC	(United Kingdom) Brian Robinson	C	3–6, 9–12
Byker Hill Garage Ltd.	Ford Lotus Cortina	(United Kingdom) Brian Robinson	C	7–8
Demetriou Group	Porsche 911	(United Kingdom) Nick Faure	C	1–6, 11–12
Duncan Hamilton Racing	Ford Escort TC	(United Kingdom) John Hine	C	9–12
Duncan Hamilton Racing	Ford Escort TC	(United Kingdom) Peter Westbury	C	5
John Willment Automobiles	Ford Escort TC	(United Kingdom) Mike Crabtree	C	All
Lach 69/SRT Holland	Porsche 911	(Netherlands) Toine Hezemans	C	12
Melton Racing	Ford Escort TC	(United Kingdom) Barry Pearson	C	1–3, 5–12
Paddy McNally	Porsche 911 T	(United Kingdom) Charles Lucas	C	1
Paul Vestey	Porsche 911 T	(United States) Roy Pike	C	11
Rasmussen	Porsche 911 S	(Denmark) Sven Engstrøm	C	12
Team Diamond	Ford Escort TC	(United Kingdom) Rod Mansfield	C	All
Willy Kay	Ford Escort TC	(United Kingdom) Willy Kay	C	6–7, 9–10, 12
Willy Kay	Ford Escort TC	(United Kingdom) Willie Green	C	8, 11
Unknown	Ford Escort TC	(Denmark) Tom Belsø	C	5
Unknown	Ford Escort TC	(United Kingdom) John Bloomfield	C	12
Unknown	Ford Escort TC	(United Kingdom) Terry Drury	C	11
Unknown	Ford Lotus Cortina Mk2	(United Kingdom) Peter Jackson	C	4–5
Unknown	Ford Escort TC	(United Kingdom) Pat Mannion	C	6–8, 10–12
Alan Mann Racing	Ford Escort TC (s/c)	(Australia) Frank Gardner	D	All
Biggleswade	Ford Mustang	(Australia) Brian Muir	D	12
Bill Shaw Racing	Ford Falcon Sprint	(United Kingdom) David Howes	D	12
Bill Shaw Racing	Ford Falcon Sprint	(United Kingdom) Roy Pierpoint	D	1–5, 11–12
Bill Shaw Racing	Chevrolet Camaro	(United Kingdom) Roy Pierpoint	D	6–10
David Howes	Ford Falcon Sprint	(United Kingdom) Mike Moore	D	9
Malcolm Gartlan Racing	Ford Falcon Sprint	(Australia) Brian Muir	D	1–2, 4
Ovaltine Racing	Chevrolet Camaro	(United Kingdom) Martin Thomas	D	2, 5
Unknown	Ford Falcon Sprint	(Republic of Ireland) Martin Birrane	D	All
Unknown	Vauxhall Viva GT (s/c)	(United Kingdom) Mike Davies	D	1, 6, 11
Unknown	Chevrolet Camaro	(United Kingdom) Hugh Dibley	D	11
Unknown	Ford Falcon Sprint	(United Kingdom) Dennis Leech	D	5–12
Unknown	Chevrolet Camaro	(United Kingdom) Mike Kearon	D	7, 10
Unknown	Ford Falcon Sprint	(United Kingdom) Terry Sanger	D	All
Unknown	Ford Mustang	(United Kingdom) John Williamson	D	6

Icon	Class
A	0-1000cc
B	1001-1300cc
C	1301-2000cc
D	Over 2000cc

== Calendar & Winners ==
All races were held in the United Kingdom. Overall winners in bold.

Round		Circuit	Date	Class A Winner	Class B Winner	Class C Winner	Class D Winner
1		Brands Hatch, Kent	16 March	(Republic of Ireland) Alec Poole	(United Kingdom) Gordon Spice	(United Kingdom) Mike Crabtree	(United Kingdom) **Roy Pierpoint**
2		Silverstone Circuit, Northamptonshire	30 March	(Republic of Ireland) Alec Poole	(United Kingdom) John Fitzpatrick	(United Kingdom) Mike Crabtree	(Australia) **Frank Gardner**
3		Snetterton Motor Racing Circuit, Norfolk	4 April	(Republic of Ireland) Alec Poole	(United Kingdom) Chris Craft	(United Kingdom) Nick Faure	(United Kingdom) **Roy Pierpoint**
4		Thruxton Circuit, Hampshire	7 April	(Republic of Ireland) Alec Poole	(United Kingdom) Chris Craft	(United Kingdom) Rod Mansfield	(United Kingdom) **Roy Pierpoint**
5		Silverstone Circuit, Northamptonshire	17 May	(Republic of Ireland) Alec Poole	(United Kingdom) Chris Craft	(United Kingdom) Barry Pearson	(United Kingdom) **Roy Pierpoint**
6	A	Crystal Palace Circuit, London	26 May	(United Kingdom) Rob Mason	(United Kingdom) **Gordon Spice**	Not contested.	
6	B	Crystal Palace Circuit, London	26 May	Not contested.		(United Kingdom) Mike Crabtree	(Australia) **Frank Gardner**
7	A	Mallory Park, Leicestershire	29 June	(United Kingdom) Lawrie Hickman	(United Kingdom) **Gordon Spice*** (United Kingdom) **Chris Craft***	Not contested.	
7	B	Mallory Park, Leicestershire	29 June	Not contested.		(United Kingdom) **Rod Mansfield**	(United Kingdom) Dennis Leech
8		Croft Circuit, North Yorkshire	12 July	(United Kingdom) Lawrie Hickman	(United Kingdom) John Fitzpatrick	(United Kingdom) Rod Mansfield	(United Kingdom) **Roy Pierpoint**
9		Silverstone Circuit, Northamptonshire	19 July	(Republic of Ireland) Alec Poole	(United Kingdom) Chris Craft	(United Kingdom) John Hine	(United Kingdom) **Roy Pierpoint**
10		Oulton Park, Cheshire	16 August	(Republic of Ireland) Alec Poole	(United Kingdom) Chris Craft	(United Kingdom) Mike Crabtree	(United Kingdom) **Dennis Leech**
11		Brands Hatch, Kent	1 September	(United Kingdom) Lawrie Hickman	(United Kingdom) Chris Craft	(United Kingdom) Mike Crabtree	(United Kingdom) **Dennis Leech**
12		Brands Hatch, Kent	19 October	(United Kingdom) Lawrie Hickman	(United Kingdom) John Fitzpatrick	(United Kingdom) Barry Pearson	(Australia) **Frank Gardner**

- Dead heat.

== Championship results ==
Driver's championship
Pos.	Driver	Car	Points
1	(Republic of Ireland) Alec Poole	Austin Mini Cooper S 970	76
2	(United Kingdom) Chris Craft	Ford Escort 1300 GT	67
3	(Australia) Frank Gardner	Ford Escort Twin Cam	58
4	(United Kingdom) Mike Crabtree	Ford Escort Twin Cam	54
5	(United Kingdom) Gordon Spice	Morris Mini Cooper S	46
6	(United Kingdom) Rob Mason	Austin Mini Cooper S 970	44
