= 1977 Australian Sports Sedan Championship =

Motor racing competition

The 1977 Australian Sports Sedan Championship was a CAMS sanctioned national motor racing title for drivers of Sports Sedans complying with Group B regulations.

The championship, which was the second Australian Sports Sedan Championship, was won by Frank Gardner driving a Chevrolet Corvair.

== Scehedule ==
The championship was contested over a seven-round series.

- Round 1, Oran Park, New South Wales, 1 May
- Round 2, Surfers Paradise, Queensland, 15 May
- Round 3, Wanneroo Park, Western Australia, 12 June
- Round 4, Sandown Park, Victoria, 3 July
- Round 5, Calder Raceway, Victoria, 7 August
- Round 6, Adelaide International Raceway, South Australia, 21 August
- Round 7, Symmons Plains, Tasmania, 18 September

Round 1 was conducted as a single race and all other rounds were contested over two heats.

== Points system ==
Championship points were awarded on a 9–6–4–3–2–1 basis to the top six placegetters in each round.

Only the best six round results for each driver were counted.

Where rounds were run over two heats, results were determined by awarding round points on a 20–16–13–11–10–9–8–7–6–5–4–3–2–1 basis to the top fourteen placegetters in each heat. Where round points were tied, the relevant round placing was awarded to the driver attaining the higher position in the second heat.

== Competitors ==
| Entrant | Car | No. | Driver |
| Marlboro Holden Dealer Team | Holden LH Torana | 2 | Ron Harrop |
| Phil Lucas | Volvo 142 | 3 | Phil Lucas |
| Bob Nitschke | Holden Torana | 3 | Bob Nitschke |
| Shell Sport | Holden LX Torana | 4 | Kevin Bartlett |
| John Player Racing | Chevrolet Corvair Corsa | 6 | Frank Gardner |
| Bob Jane 2UW Racing Team | Holden HQ Monaro | 7 | Bob Jane |
| Donald Elliott | Chrysler Valiant Charger | 9 | Tony Edmondson |
| Ling Gowans Toyota | Toyota Celica | 11 | Bruce Gowans |
| Jim Richards | Ford Mustang | 12 | Jim Richards |
| Tony Watts | Ford Escort | 12 | Tony Watts |
| Shell Sport | Chevrolet Camaro | 14 | David Jarrett |
| Dick Johnson | Ford XB Falcon GT | 17 | Dick Johnson |
| Top Of The Town Motors | Ford Escort | 17 | Allan Watts |
| Brian Wood Ford | Ford XB Falcon GT | 18 | Murray Carter |
| Modern Auto Wreckers | Holden Torana | 18 | Steven Chopping |
| Tim Slako | Holden LH Torana SLR5000 L34 | 21 | Tim Slako |
| Mike Cloak | Ford Capri | 23 | Mike Cloak |
| Allan Moffat | Ford Capri | 25 | Allan Moffat |
| Ross Bennett | Morris Mini Clubman | 29 | Ross Bennett |
| Terry Reed | Holden FJ | 30 | Terry Reed |
| Greater Pacific Finance | Ford Escort | 34 | Garry Rogers |
| Greater Pacific Finance | Holden HQ Monaro | 34 | Garry Rogers |
| Gordon Mitchell | Leyland Marina | 37 | Gordon Mitchell |
| Warren Matthews | Holden EH | 40 | Warren Matthews |
| Dave Cliffe | Ford Cortina | 41 | Dave Cliffe |
| Ken Loughran | Toyota Corolla | 41 | Ken Loughran |
| Tanners Service Centre | Holden Gemini | 42 | Leon Burdon |
| Peter Wells | Vauxhall Viva | 43 | Peter Wells |
| Rob Davies Autos | Toyota Corolla | 44 | Rob Davies |
| John Glasson | Ford Escort | 45 | John Glasson |
| John Gifford | Mini Cooper S | 46 | John Gifford |
| Brian Smith | Chrysler Valiant Charger | 47 | Brian Smith |
| Neville Cooper | Alfa Romeo GTV | 48 | Neville Cooper |
| Les Verco | Toyota Corolla | 51 | Les Verco |
| David O'Brien | Holden Torana GTR XU-1 | 53 | David O'Brien |
| Mario Romeri | Ford Escort | 55 | Mario Romeri |
| Stewart Salter | Holden HB Torana | 55 | Stewart Salter |
| Laurie Hazelton | Holden HK Monaro | 57 | Laurie Hazelton |
| Ron Lindau | Ford Falcon | 59 | Ron Lindau |
| Graeme Elliott | Ford Falcon | 59 | Graeme Elliott |
| Globe Hotel Racing | Holden Torana GTR XU-1 | 62 | Ed Conacher |
| Steven Birtwistle | Holden Torana GTR XU-1 | 63 | Steven Birtwistle |
| Roger Mahoney | Ford Escort | 65 | Roger Mahoney |
| Peter Gillon | Ford Cortina | 66 | Peter Gillon |
| Hitachi | Holden LH Torana | 69 | Rex Monahan |
| Peter Flanagan | Mini Cooper S | 69 | Peter Flanagan |
| Ray Mead | Holden EH | 70 | Ray Mead |
| Barry Percy | Morris Mini Clubman GT | 72 | Barry Percy |
| Jon Riordan | Holden EH | 79 | Jon Riordan |
| RJ Smith | Holden FX | 80 | RJ Smith |
| Tino Leo | Holden HQ Monaro | 85 | Tino Leo |
| Barry Kallawk | Holden Torana | 86 | Barry Kallawk |
| Stephen Bell | Holden Torana GTR XU-1 | 86 | Stephen Bell |
| Geoff Moran | Ford Capri | 87 | Geoff Moran |
| Peter Kitto | Ford Capri | 88 | Peter Kitto |
| Industrial Services | Mazda R100 | 93 | Nathan Cherry |
| Brian Rhodes | Holden Torana | 94 | Brian Rhodes |
| Bill Stace | Mini Cooper S | 96 | Bill Stace |
| Stephen Wynwood | Holden EH | 96 | Stephen Wynwood |
| Phillips Industries/World Of Tyres | Holden LJ Torana | 98 | Ian Diffen |
| Matt De Paoli | Holden EH | 99 | Matt De Paoli |
| Garry Luttrell | Holden EH | 102 | Garry Luttrell |
| Leigh Lovering | Holden Torana | 108 | Leigh Lovering |
| Tony Jory | Ford Falcon | 109 | Tony Jory |
| Martin Sinclair | Holden Torana GTR XU-1 | 114 | Martin Sinclair |
| Richard Purtell | Holden Torana GTR XU-1 | 117 | Richard Purtell |
| Garry Stevens | Holden EH | 120 | Garry Stevens |
| Paul Minehan | Holden FX | 123 | Paul Minehan |
| Brian Shelley | Holden Torana GTR XU-1 | 124 | Brian Shelley |
| Brian Higgins Motors | Holden LH Torana | 125 | Graham Parsons |
| M.Arnold | Holden FX | 130 | M.Arnold |
| Ted Garrad | Ford Capri | 133 | Ted Garrad |
| Darryl Wilcox | Holden Torana GTR XU-1 | 134 | Darryl Wilcox |
| Alan Welling | Holden Torana GTR XU-1 | 135 | Alan Welling |

== Results ==
| Position | Driver | No. | Car | Entrant | Ora. | Sur. | Wan. | San. | Cal. | Ade. | Sym. | Total |
| 1 | Frank Gardner | 6 | Chevrolet Corvair Corsa | John Player Racing | 9 | (4) | 9 | 9 | 6 | 9 | 9 | 51 |
| 2 | Bob Jane | 7 | Holden Monaro HQ | Bob Jane 2UW Racing Team | 6 | 9 | 4 | 6 | 9 | 6 | – | 40 |
| 3 | Garry Rogers | 34 | Ford Escort & Holden Monaro HQ | Greater Pacific Finance | 3 | – | – | 3 | 3 | 3 | 6 | 18 |
| 4 | Jim Richards | 12 | Ford Mustang | Jim Richards | 2 | 6 | – | 4 | – | 4 | – | 16 |
| 5 | Ian Diffen | 98 | Holden Torana LJ Chevrolet | Philips Industries – World of Tyres | – | – | 6 | – | – | – | – | 6 |
| | Phil Lucas | | Volvo 142 | | 4 | 2 | – | – | – | – | – | 6 |
| 7 | Kevin Bartlett | 4 | Holden Torana LX | ShellSport | – | – | – | – | – | 1 | 4 | 5 |
| 8 | Tony Edmondson | 9 | Chrysler Valiant Charger Repco Holden | Donald Elliott | – | – | – | – | 4 | – | – | 4 |
| | Darryl Wilcox | 134 | Holden Torana GTR XU-1 | | – | – | – | – | 1 | – | 3 | 4 |
| 10 | Dick Johnson | | Ford Falcon XB GT | Dick Johnson | – | 3 | – | – | – | – | – | 3 |
| | Tim Slako | 21 | Holden Torana SL/R 5000 L34 | | – | – | 3 | – | – | – | – | 3 |
| 12 | Neville Cooper | 48 | Alfa Romeo GTV | | – | – | 2 | – | – | – | – | 2 |
| | Murray Carter | | Ford Falcon XB GT | | – | – | – | 2 | – | – | – | 2 |
| | Tino Leo | | Holden Monaro HQ | | – | – | – | – | 2 | – | – | 2 |
| | David Jarrett | 14 | Chevrolet Camaro | ShellSport | – | – | – | – | – | 2 | – | 2 |
| | Steven Birtwistle | 63 | Holden Torana | | – | – | – | – | – | – | 2 | 2 |
| 17 | Laurie Hazelton | | Holden Monaro HK | | 1 | – | – | – | – | – | – | 1 |
| | Allan Moffat | | Ford Capri | | – | 1 | – | – | – | – | – | 1 |
| | Brian Smith | 47 | Chrysler Valiant Charger | | – | – | 1 | – | – | – | – | 1 |
| | Ron Harrop | 2 | Holden Torana | Marboro Holden Dealer Team | – | – | – | 1 | – | – | – | 1 |
| | Rex Monahan | 69 | Holden Torana | | – | – | – | – | – | – | 1 | 1 |
