= 1972 British Saloon Car Championship =

15th season of the British Touring Car Championship

Seasons
- ← 1971 1973 →

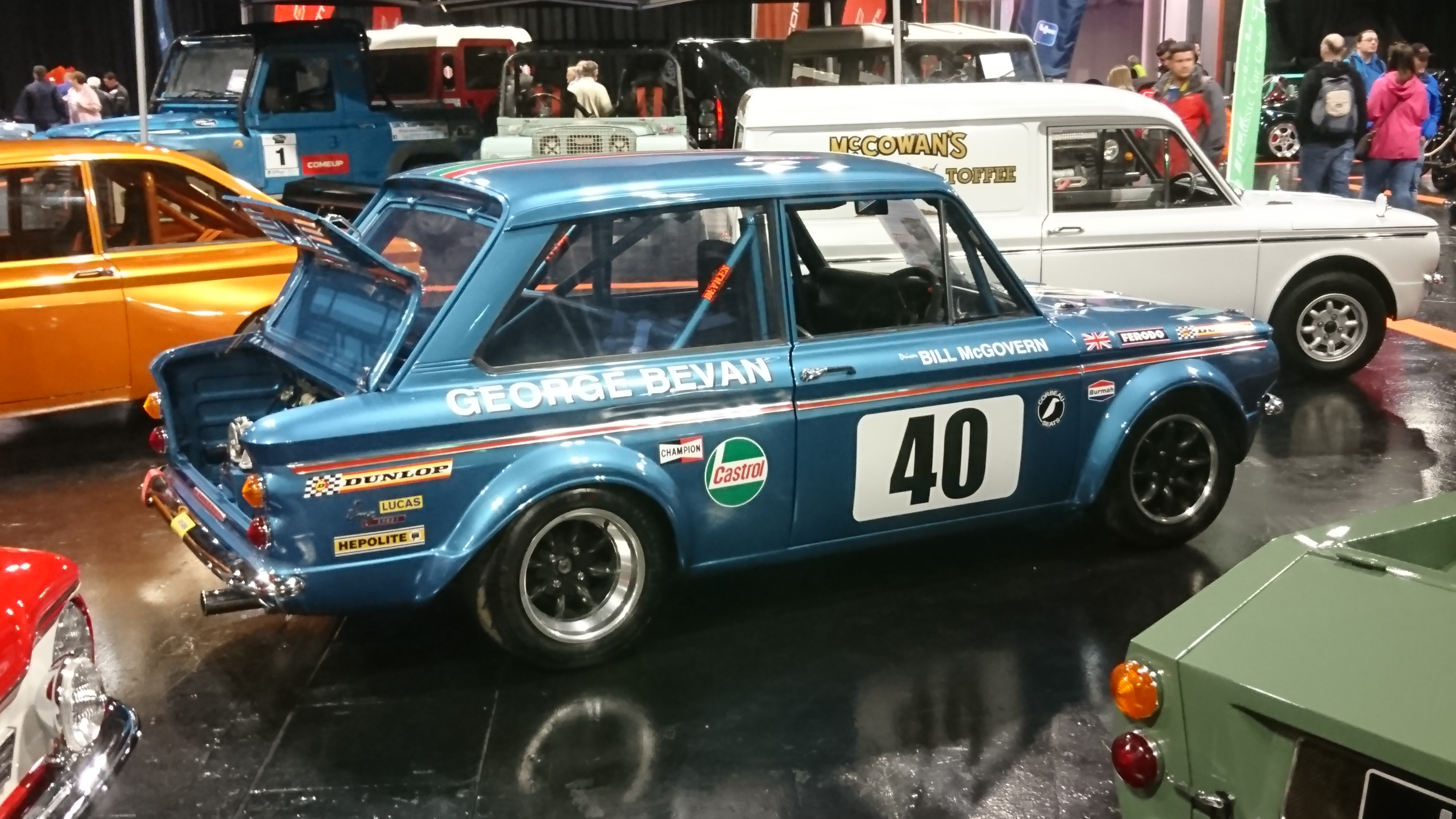
Pictured in 2017, Bill McGovern's Hillman/Sunbeam Imp, the winner of the 1972 British Saloon Car Championship.

The 1972 RAC Wiggins Teape Paperchase British Saloon Car Championship was the 15th season of the championship. Bill McGovern became the first driver to win three BTCC titles, making it three back-to-back titles with his Sunbeam Imp.

== Calendar and winners ==
All races were held in the United Kingdom. Overall winners in bold.

Round		Circuit	Date	Class A Winner	Class B Winner	Class C Winner	Class D Winner
1		Brands Hatch, Kent	19 March	(United Kingdom) Bill McGovern	(United Kingdom) Vince Woodman	(United Kingdom) Dave Matthews	(Australia) **Frank Gardner**
2		Oulton Park, Cheshire	30 March	(United Kingdom) Bill McGovern	(United Kingdom) Jonathan Buncombe	(United Kingdom) Dave Matthews	(Australia) **Brian Muir**
3		Thruxton Circuit, Hampshire	3 April	(United Kingdom) Bill McGovern	(United Kingdom) Vince Woodman	(United Kingdom) Dave Matthews	(Australia) **Frank Gardner**
4		Silverstone Circuit, Northamptonshire	23 April	(United Kingdom) Bill McGovern	(United Kingdom) Brian Peacock	(United Kingdom) Dave Matthews	(Australia) **Frank Gardner**
5	A	Crystal Palace, London	28 May	Not contested.		(United Kingdom) Mike Crabtree	(Australia) **Brian Muir**
5	B	Crystal Palace, London	28 May	(United Kingdom) Bill McGovern	(United Kingdom) **Jonathan Buncombe**	Not contested.	
6		Brands Hatch, Kent	15 July	(United Kingdom) Bill McGovern	(Finland) Heikki Kemilainen	(United Kingdom) Dave Brodie	(Australia) **Frank Gardner**
7		Oulton Park, Cheshire	16 September	(United Kingdom) Bill McGovern	(United Kingdom) Jonathan Buncombe	(United Kingdom) Dave Matthews	(Australia) **Frank Gardner**
8		Silverstone Circuit, Northamptonshire	24 September	(United Kingdom) Bill McGovern	(Italy) Carlo Facetti	(United Kingdom) Tom Walkinshaw	(West Germany) **Dieter Glemser** (West Germany) **Jochen Mass**
9	A	Mallory Park, Leicestershire	1 October	(United Kingdom) Bill McGovern	(United Kingdom) **Jonathan Buncombe**	Not contested.	
9	B	Mallory Park, Leicestershire	1 October	Not contested.		(United Kingdom) Dave Matthews	(Australia) **Frank Gardner**
10		Brands Hatch, Kent	22 October	(United Kingdom) Bill McGovern	(United Kingdom) Jonathan Buncombe	(United Kingdom) Dave Matthews	(Australia) **Frank Gardner**

== Championship results ==
Driver's championship
Pos.	Driver	Car	Points
1	(United Kingdom) Bill McGovern	Sunbeam Imp	63
2	(United Kingdom) Dave Matthews	Ford Escort RS 1600	55
3	(Australia) Frank Gardner	Chevrolet Camaro	54
4	(United Kingdom) Jonathan Buncombe	Mini Cooper S	48
5	(Australia) Brian Muir	Ford Capri RS 2600	28
5	(United Kingdom) Melvyn Adams	Sunbeam Imp	28
