= Engman =

Engman is a surname. Notable people with the surname include:

- Adelina Engman (born 1994), Finnish footballer
- Andy Engman (1911–2004), Swedish/Finnish animator
- Harald Engman (1903-1968), Danish painter
- Helena Engman (born 1976), Swedish shot putter
- Mats Engman (born 1954), Swedish Air Force major general
- Max Engman (born 1945), Finnish historian and translator
- Peter Engman (born 1963), Swedish actor
- Robert Engman (born 1927), American sculptor
