= 1968 British Saloon Car Championship =

11th season of the British Touring Car Championship

Seasons
- ← 1967 1969 →

The 1968 BRSCC British Saloon Car Championship, was the eleventh season of the series. The Royal Automobile Club Motor Sports Association (RACMSA) took control of the championship this year from the BRSCC. Australian driver Frank Gardner successfully defended his 1967 title, changing from a Ford Falcon to contest Class C, initially with a Ford Cortina Lotus until the new Ford Escort was introduced.

== Calendar & Winners ==
All races were held in the United Kingdom. Overall winners in bold.

Round		Circuit	Date	Class A Winner	Class B Winner	Class C Winner	Class D Winner
1		Brands Hatch, Kent	17 March	(United Kingdom) Ray Calcutt	(United Kingdom) John Rhodes	(United Kingdom) Vic Elford	(Australia) **Brian Muir**
2		Thruxton Circuit, Hampshire	15 April	(United Kingdom) Chris Craft	(United Kingdom) Graham Janzen	(Australia) Frank Gardner	(Australia) **Brian Muir**
3		Silverstone Circuit, Northamptonshire	27 April	(United Kingdom) Chris Craft	(United Kingdom) John Rhodes	(United Kingdom) Vic Elford	(Australia) **Brian Muir**
4	A	Crystal Palace Circuit, London	3 June	(United Kingdom) Mike Walker	(United Kingdom) **Steve Neal**	Not contested.	
4	B	Crystal Palace Circuit, London	3 June	Not contested.		(Australia) Frank Gardner	(Australia) **Brian Muir**
5	A	Mallory Park, Leicestershire	23 June	(United Kingdom) Les Nash	(United Kingdom) **John Fitzpatrick**	Not contested.	
5	B	Mallory Park, Leicestershire	23 June	Not contested.		(Australia) Frank Gardner	(Australia) **Brian Muir**
6		Brands Hatch, Kent	20 July	(United Kingdom) Tony Lanfranchi	(United Kingdom) John Fitzpatrick	(Australia) **Frank Gardner**	(West Germany) Hubert Hahne
7		Silverstone Circuit, Northamptonshire	27 July	(United Kingdom) Les Nash	(United Kingdom) John Fitzpatrick	(Australia) Frank Gardner	(United Kingdom) **David Hobbs**
8		Croft Circuit, North Yorkshire	10 August	(United Kingdom) Gordon Spice	(United Kingdom) John Fitzpatrick	(Australia) Frank Gardner	(United Kingdom) **Roy Pierpoint**
9		Oulton Park, Cheshire	17 August	(United Kingdom) Gordon Spice	(United Kingdom) Chris Craft	(Australia) Frank Gardner	(Australia) **Brian Muir**
10		Brands Hatch, Kent	2 September	(United Kingdom) Les Nash	(United Kingdom) John Rhodes	(Australia) Frank Gardner	(United Kingdom) **Roy Pierpoint**
11		Brands Hatch, Kent	20 October	(United Kingdom) Tony Lanfranchi	(United Kingdom) Chris Craft	(Australia) **Frank Gardner**	(United Kingdom) David Hobbs

== Championship results ==
Driver's championship
Pos.	Driver	Car	Points
1	(Australia) Frank Gardner	Ford Cortina Lotus Mk 2 Ford Escort Twin Cam	84
2	(Australia) Brian Muir	Ford Falcon Sprint	58
3	(United Kingdom) Brian Robinson	Ford Cortina Lotus; Ford Escort Twin Cam	50
4	(United Kingdom) John Rhodes	Austin Mini Cooper S	50
5	(United Kingdom) Roy Pierpoint	Ford Falcon Sprint	44
6	(United Kingdom) John Fitzpatrick	Ford Escort 1300 GT	42
