= Frank Gardner (racing driver) =

Australian racing driver (1931–2009)

Frank Gardner OAM
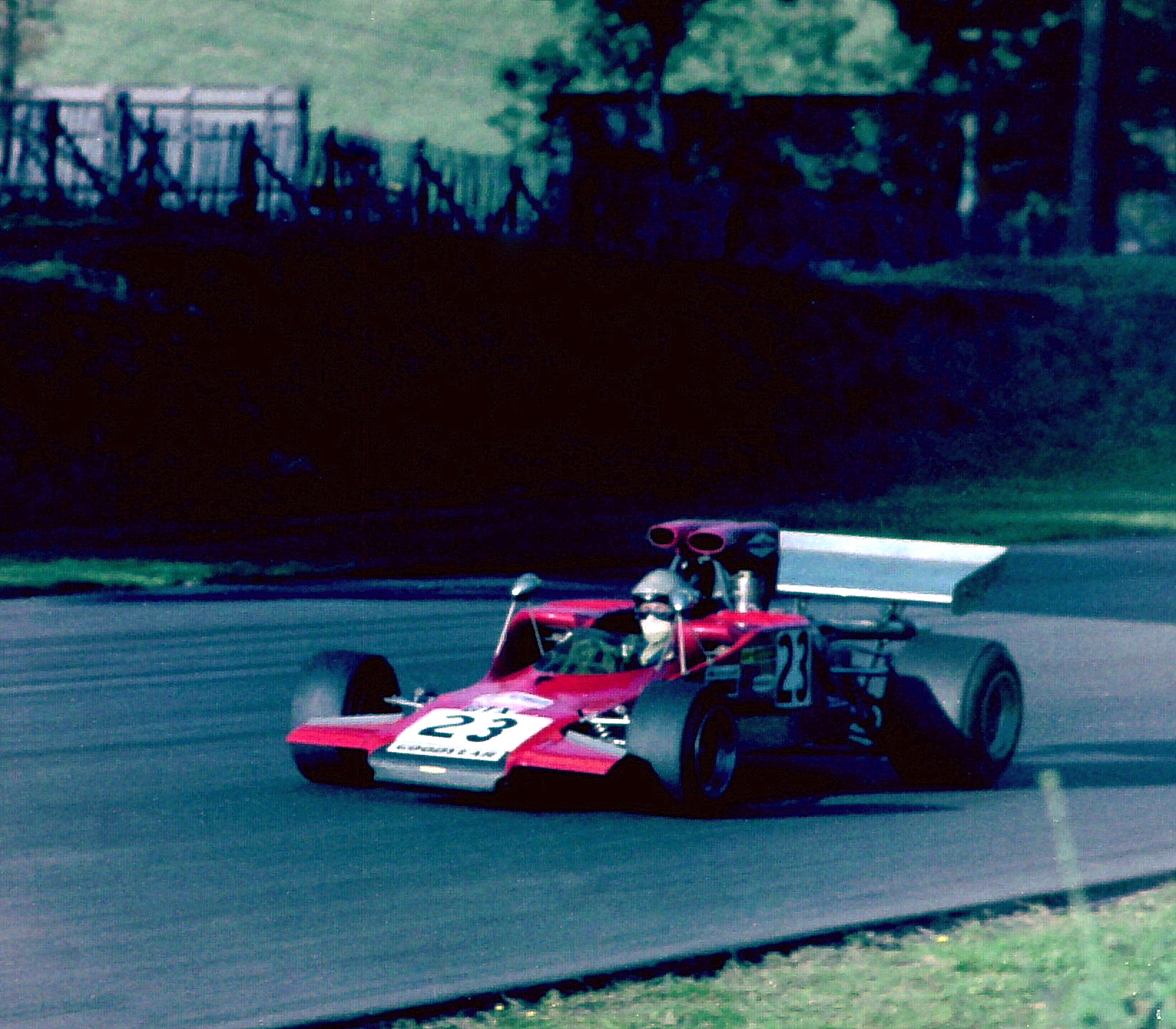
- Gardner at the wheel of his Lola T300 F5000 car, during the 1971 World Championship Victory Race at Brands Hatch
- Born: 1 October 1931; Sydney, New South Wales, Australia
- Died: 29 August 2009 (aged 77); Mermaid Waters, Queensland, Australia

Formula One World Championship career
- Nationality: (Australia) Australian
- Active years: 1964 – 1965, 1968
- Team(s): non-works Brabham, BRM
- Entries: 9 (8 starts)
- Championships: 0
- Wins: 0
- Podiums: 0
- Career points: 0
- Pole positions: 0
- Fastest laps: 0
- First entry: 1964 British Grand Prix
- Last entry: 1968 Italian Grand Prix

Frank Gardner OAM (1 October 1931 – 29 August 2009) was a racing driver from Australia. Born in Sydney, he was best known for touring car racing, winning the British Saloon Car Championship three times, and sports car racing driver but he was also a top flight open wheeler driver. He was European Formula 5000 champion, and participated in nine World Championship Formula One Grands Prix, debuting on 11 July 1964. He scored no championship points.

Gardner also participated in numerous non-Championship Formula One races and his results included a third placing at the 1965 Mediterranean Grand Prix at the Autodromo di Pergusa in Sicily, fourth in the 1965 Race of Champions at Brands Hatch and third in the 1971 International Gold Cup at Oulton Park. He participated each year in the open wheeler Tasman Series held in New Zealand and Australia during the European winter, shared the grids with the likes of Jim Clark, Graham Hill and Jochen Rindt, and won the 1972 New Zealand Grand Prix.

On his return to Australia he ran his own touring car racing team under several branded names, most notably JPS Team BMW and was BMW's factory Australian team for over a decade. The team won two Australian Touring Car Championships and the 1988 Bathurst 1000. The team was sold to the Morris family in the 1990s, becoming Paul Morris Motorsport with Gardner continuing to run the team until his retirement in 1998. The team also won the 1997 Bathurst 1000 and six Australian Super Touring Championships.

Gardner was an Australian champion surf boat rower in 1953, rowing for Whale Beach Surf Life Saving Club. The coach was Jack Uren, brother of politician Tom Uren.

== Career ==
Gardner was born in 1931, not 1930 as is often quoted. He changed his date of birth on documents which permitted the under-age Gardner to gain a racing licence. He sailed to England late in 1958 following his ownership of a Mobilgas service station in Avalon on Sydney's northern beaches, and a successful career driving Jaguar XK120s, a C-Type (XKC037) and D-Type (XKD520). Both latter cars were insurance write-offs and repaired by Gardner and his friends.

Unlike most racing drivers, Gardner was born into a very poor family. His father moved the large family to Ulladulla on the south coast of New South Wales where he was a fisherman. When his father was killed after being hit by a drunk driver, Gardner went to live with his unmarried uncle Hope Bartlett – a legend in Australia and New Zealand as a racing driver and golfer.

Bartlett put Gardner under his guidance and brought him up to be an automotive engineer. Gardner always preferred engineering cars to driving, and went to England to join Jaguar, but disliked the Midlands in the middle of winter. Subsequently, he joined Aston Martin as a racing mechanic.

Gardner was a member of the Aston team which won 1959 24 Hours of Le Mans. He told team boss John Wyer he needed to run a Colotti gearbox. Wyer was affronted by the young 'colonial', but swapped the gearbox on one of the cars – and it won – while the other broke down.

Gardner joined the Jim Russell Driving School where he prepared the cars, then became the 'star pupil driver' because he was unknown in England as a driver. He was later the first person employed by Jack Brabham in the new MRD F1 racing team — soon to become Brabham.

In 1966 World Sportscar Championship season, Gardner finished second in the 1000 km Spa round of the International Manufacturers Championship. In 1967, he also finished second in the European Trophy for Formula 2 Drivers and second in the British Autocar Formula Two Championship. In 1970, he was fourth in the European Formula 5000 Championship and then won the championship the following year.

Gardner won his class at Le Mans in 1961 sharing a works Lotus Elite with David Hobbs.

Gardner also travelled to the United States and drove in the Sports Car Club of America's newly established Trans-Am Series in 1966, finishing the last race of the inaugural season at the Riverside International Raceway 4 hour race in fourth place outright and winning the Under 2L division driving a Lotus Cortina. Gardner was among a number of Australians who drove in the early years of the Trans-Am, including Allan Moffat, Harry Firth and Horst Kwech. In 1968, he had his first and only NASCAR start at Rockingham driving a Ford.

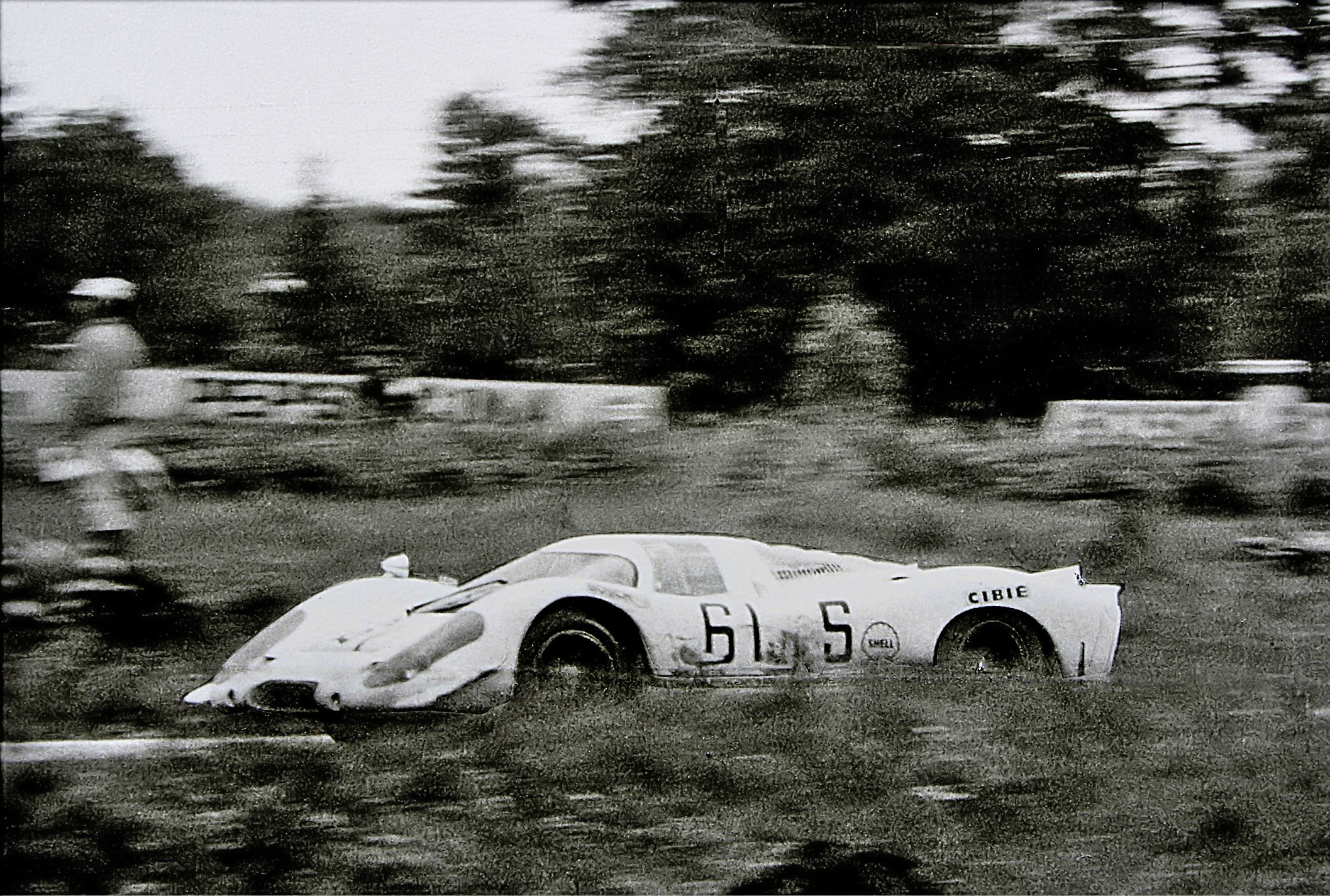
The Porsche 917 of Gardner and David Piper at the 1969 1000km Nürburgring

When the Porsche 917 had is debut at the 1969 1000km Spa, like Le Mans a very fast race track on public roads for which the 917 was made for, Porsche factory drivers preferred the 908 which won several races in a row, and the 917 raced only one lap. Even worse at the 1969 1000km Nürburgring, a bumpy twisty race track in which the factory entered a 917 only once, in 1969, without any of its numerous drivers willing to race the overpowered aerodynamically unstable 917. All factory drivers chose the 908/02 spyder, won the race 1-2-3-4-5 and the 1969 World Sportscar Championship for Porsche. Having spend millions to develop and build two dozens of the 917, the factory needed results to sell them to privateer racers. Porsche hired BMW factory drivers Hubert Hahne and Dieter Quester to practise with the 917, which they did on Friday before BMW vetoed them driving the Porsche. Then, David Piper was contacted; he brought his neighbour Frank Gardner along when they were flown in on Saturday, but could not do much on a now wet track. On Sunday, Piper started the 1000km race with the 917. Together with Gardner, they finished the race in 8th place, 4 laps behind the winners on the 908, but delivering the much needed very first race finish of the 917. Piper later purchased one.

In the late 1960s and early 1970s, Gardner had two second-place finishes in the Australian Grand Prix – in 1966 at Lakeside behind Graham Hill and 1972 at Sandown behind Graham McRae. In between there was a third in 1967 at Warwick Farm in his home town of Sydney behind British Formula One champion Jim Clark and future champion Jackie Stewart. He drove a works Brabham at the Oulton Park Gold Cup in 1967.

Gardner finished third in the 1967 and 1972 Tasman Series. He won the British Saloon Car Championship title on three occasions, 1967 (Ford Falcon Sprint), 1968 (Ford Cortina Lotus & Ford Escort) and 1973 (Chevrolet Camaro), and was runner-up in 1970 (Ford Mustang Boss 302). In 1975 he finished second in the Hardie-Ferodo 1000 at Bathurst with Bob Morris in a Holden Torana SL/R 5000 L34.

Gardner won the 1972 New Zealand Grand Prix, which was run under Tasman Formula regulations (which incorporated Formula 5000 cars) and was the first round of the 1972 Tasman Series, at Pukekohe driving a Lola T300-Chevrolet. He was extremely proud of winning the New Zealand title because Bartlett had won it in the 1930s.

== Return to Australia ==
After returning full-time to Australia in the mid-1970s, Gardner won the 1977 Australian Sports Sedan Championship driving a highly modified Chevrolet Corvair. That championship victory led into a team management role when he retired from full-time driving. After running the Allan Grice Touring Car and Sports Sedan team in the late 70s, it rolled into a factory touring car preparation for BMW in the Australian Touring Car Championship, a team he would run from the programs toe in the water inception with a BMW 318i turbo Sports Sedan in 1980 all the way until 1987 when Gardner decided to retire from motorsport and close the JPS Team BMW after allegedly becoming fed up with the politics involved after his protest against the Eggenberger Motorsport Ford Sierra RS500s at the 1987 James Hardie 1000 which had become a round of the inaugural World Touring Car Championship. However, when asked about this in 1988, Gardner dismissed the notion saying instead that he had been unwell and simply needed a break.

Gardner's last competitive drive was to be as co-driver with JPS Team lead driver Jim Richards in the team's Group C spec BMW 635 CSi in the 1983 James Hardie 1000 at Bathurst. After Richards qualified the car in a brilliant fourth place in Hardies Heroes, the black and gold BMW was suddenly seen as a dark horse for the race. However, race day was a disaster for the team. On lap 3, the BMW suddenly slowed and Richards headed for the pits where the team found metal filings in the fuel system. The car only did another four laps before being retired from the race. Gardner would later claim that he believed the car had been sabotaged although he did not know by who and wouldn't speculate on the reason, though the car not being Australian made and its cigarette sponsorship were popular theories at the time. However, as the cigarette sponsored Holden Dealer Team (Marlboro) and Allan Moffat's Mazda team (Peter Stuyvesant) who finished Bathurst in first and second respectively were not targeted, some felt the car being European was a more likely reason. At the time, the long-held Holden and Ford V8 domination of Group C touring car racing in Australia was under serious threat with factory-backed teams from foreign manufacturers the likes of the European BMW, and Japanese marques Mazda and Nissan, and this was unpopular with not only the fans, but some within the sport itself. The claim of sabotage is actually disputed by Jim Richards and the team's chief mechanic Pip Baker who believe that the dirty fuel could have been a combination of things.

Following the 1983 Bathurst 1000, Gardner was not only the team manager but also the main test driver for JPS Team BMW. This was because the team itself was based in Sydney (doing almost all of its testing at Amaroo Park) while the team's drivers Richards and (from 1984) Tony Longhurst lived in Melbourne and on the Gold Coast respectively. It is estimated that Gardner completed more time driving the various 635 CSi's and M3's than either Richards or Longhurst.

Following his sudden retirement at the end of 1987, JPS Team BMW was replaced as BMW Australia's team by Peter Brock's former Holden Dealer Team operation, although that relationship ended after a single season in which the BMW M3 had become uncompetitive against the increasingly powerful and numerous Sierras. During his time as leader of JPS Team BMW, the team won the 1985 and 1987 Australian Touring Car Championships with Jim Richards, driving first a 635 CSi and then an M3. Richards also won the 1985 and 1986 Australian Endurance Championships as well as the 1985 AMSCAR Series at Amaroo Park while Longhurst won the AMSCAR in 1986 and 1987. Richards and Longhurst also teamed to win the 1985 Castrol 500 at Sandown Raceway in the 635 CSi with their teammates Neville Crichton and on-loan Nissan driver George Fury finishing 2nd.

JPS team driver Tony Longhurst decided to form his own team, which became known as LoGaMo Racing, for 1988, running a Ford Sierra RS500, with Gardner acting as a 'consultant', although it was generally accepted that he and Longhurst shared the team manager duties. Gardner finally won the Bathurst 1000 in 1988 when Longhurst and Tomas Mezera won in their Benson & Hedges sponsored Sierra. The team continued to run the Fords through 1989 and 1990. During 1990 it was generally believed that the Benson & Hedges Sierras were the fastest and most powerful Group A touring cars in the world. This was confirmed at the 1990 Tooheys 1000 at Bathurst when Longurst broke George Fury's 1984 Hardies Heroes lap record with a 2:13.84 lap in Friday's qualifying session, the 590 bhp (440 kW; 598 PS) Sierra reportedly topping 295 km/h (183 mph) on the 1.3 kilometres (0.81 mi) long Conrod Straight. Unfortunately for the Gardner-led team, race results weren't as forthcoming with the only wins being in 1988 and later in the Amaroo Park based AMSCAR series.

When BMW returned to the Australian championship in 1991 with its upgraded BMW M3 Evolution model, it was with Longhurst Racing with Gardner at the helm with 1980 Formula One World Champion Alan Jones driving the team's second car. The factory BMW team continued with Gardner at the helm until 1998 (switching to Supertouring cars in 1994), winning the 1994 (with Longhurst), 1995 and 1997 (with Paul Morris) Super Touring titles.

== Other activities ==
Gardner had a passion for road driver training and had commenced to do that at Bob Jane's Calder Race Track in Melbourne. In 1990 he founded his own Performance Driving Centre between Brisbane and the Gold Coast in Queensland and was awarded the Order of Australia (the equivalent of a knighthood in the UK) for his services to motor racing. Before taking up motor racing he had been an unbeaten boxer and champion surf life saver (he was Captain of the Whale Beach Surf Life Saving Club in Sydney and also participated in South Africa). Gardner reportedly could have also been a professional golfer and was also a motorcycle racer.

Gardner was an engineer as well as an accomplished racing driver, which helped him in both his racing career and as a team owner and manager. He was also a public speaker and spoke with crowds about his own experiences, other drivers, and characters within motor racing.

In 1973, Patrick Stephens Ltd., published a book penned by Gardner entitled "Racing Drivers Manual" in collaboration with Castrol Oils Ltd. This book was a mixture of useful advice for the budding racing driver punctuated by Gardner's autobiographical recollections of his early life and many racing experiences.

In 1980, Gardner published a book titled Drive to Survive. It is still in print 25 years later.

== Death ==
Gardner, who had raced during an era when safety wasn't a big concern for the drivers and where many of his fellow drivers (including a number of close friends such as World Champion Jim Clark) were killed in racing accidents, had always maintained that he didn't care if he wasn't the fastest driver, he just wanted to be the oldest. He died in his home at Mermaid Waters in Queensland on 29 August 2009 at the age of 78 following a long battle with illness associated with his racing and engineering career.

Gardner left behind his former model wife Gloria and a son and daughter.

== Career results ==
A summary of some of Gardner's motor racing achievements:

Season	Series	Position	Car	Team / Entrant
1957	Australian Drivers' Championship	15th	Jaguar C-Type	F Gardner
1964	Tasman Series	11th	Brabham BT6 Ford	Alec Mildren Racing
1964	British Saloon Car Championship	11th	Ford Cortina Lotus	John Willment Automobiles
1965	Tasman Series	4th	Brabham BT11A Climax FPF	Alec Mildren Racing
1965	Trophées de France	4th	Cooper T75 BRM; Lola T60 BRM & Lola T60 Cosworth SCA	Tyrrell Racing Organisation; Midland Racing Partnership
1965	British Saloon Car Championship	5th	Ford Cortina Lotus	Race Proved by Willment
1966	Tasman Series	5th	Brabham BT11A Climax FPF	Alec Mildren Racing
1966	Trophées de France	16th	Lola Ford Cosworth	Midland Racing Partnership
1967	Tasman Series	2nd	Brabham BT16 Climax FPF	Alec Mildren Racing
1967	European Trophy for Formula 2 Drivers	2nd	Brabham BT23 & BT23C Ford Cosworth FVA	Motor Racing Developments
1967	R.A.C. British F2 Championship	6th	Brabham BT23 Ford Cosworth FVA	Motor Racing Developments
1967	Autocar British F2 Championship	2nd	Brabham BT23 Ford Cosworth FVA	Motor Racing Developments
1967	British Saloon Car Championship	1st	Ford Falcon Sprint	Alan Mann Racing
1968	Tasman Series	4th	Brabham BT23D Alfa Romeo	Alec Mildren Racing
1968	European Touring Car Challenge	3rd – Div 2	Ford Cortina Lotus & Ford Escort Mk.I Twin Cam	Alan Mann Racing
1968	British Saloon Car Championship	1st	Ford Cortina Lotus & Ford Escort Mk.I Twin Cam	Alan Mann Racing
1969	Tasman Series	5th	Mildren Mono Alfa Romeo	Alec Mildren Racing
1969	British Saloon Car Championship	3rd	Ford Escort Mk.I Twin Cam	Alan Mann Racing
1970	Guards European Formula 5000 Championship	3rd	Lola T190 Chevrolet	Motor Racing Research
1970	British Saloon Car Championship	2nd	Ford Mustang Boss 302	Motor Racing Research
1971	Tasman Series	4th	Lola T192 Chevrolet	Lola Race Cars
1971	Rothmans European Formula 5000 Championship	1st	Lola T192 Chevrolet; Lola T300 Chevrolet	Lola Race Cars
1972	Tasman Series	3rd	Lola T300 Chevrolet	Lola Race Cars
1972	Rothmans European Formula 5000 Championship	10th	Lola T330 Chevrolet	Lola Cars
1972	British Saloon Car Championship	3rd	Chevrolet Camaro Z28	SCA Freight Ltd.
1973	British Saloon Car Championship	1st	Chevrolet Camaro Z28	SCA European Road Services
1976	Australian Touring Car Championship	24th	Holden LH Torana SL/R 5000 L34	Gown-Hindhaugh
1976	Australian Sports Sedan Championship	2nd	Chevrolet Corvair	John Player Racing
1977	Australian Sports Sedan Championship	1st	Chevrolet Corvair	John Player Racing

=== Complete 24 Hours of Le Mans results ===
Year	Team	Co-drivers	Car	Class	Laps	Pos.	Class pos.
1962	(United Kingdom) Team Lotus Engineering	(United Kingdom) David Hobbs	Lotus Elite Mk14-Coventry Climax	GT 1.3	286	8th	**1st**
1963	(United Kingdom) Team Elite	(United Kingdom) John Coundley	Lotus Elite Mk14-Coventry Climax	GT 1.3	167	DNF	DNF
1966	(United Kingdom) Alan Mann Racing Ltd.	(United Kingdom) John Whitmore	Ford GT40 Mk.II	P +5.0	31	DNF	DNF
1967	(United States) Holman & Moody	(United States) Roger McCluskey	Ford GT40 Mk.IIB	P +5.0	179	DNF	DNF
1969	(United Kingdom) Alan Mann Racing Ltd.	(United Kingdom) Malcolm Guthrie	Ford GT40 Mk.I	S 5.0	42	DNF	DNF

=== Complete British Saloon Car Championship results ===
(key) (Races in bold indicate pole position; races in italics indicate fastest lap.)

Year	Team	Car	Class	1	2	3	4	5	6	7	8	9	10	11	12	Pos.	Pts	Class
1963	John Willment Automobiles	Ford Cortina GT	B	SNE	OUL	GOO	AIN	SIL ?	CRY	SIL	BRH	BRH	OUL	SIL			2	
1964	John Willment Automobiles	Ford Cortina Lotus	B	SNE; 5	GOO; 4	OUL	AIN; 5	SIL ?	CRY; 3†	BRH; DNS	OUL					11th	16	
1965	John Willment Automobiles	Ford Cortina Lotus	C	BRH; Ret	OUL; 3	SNE; 4	GOO; 4	SIL; 5	CRY; 4†	BRH; 4	OUL; Ret					5th	34	2nd
1967	Alan Mann Racing	Ford Falcon Sprint	D	**BRH**; 1	SNE; 2	**SIL**; 2	**SIL**; 1	MAL; 1†	**SIL**; 1	**SIL**; 1	BRH; Ret	**OUL**; 1†	**BRH**; 1			1st	70	1st
1968	Alan Mann Racing	Ford Cortina Lotus Mk 2	C	**BRH**; 3	**THR**; 3	**SIL**; 4										1st	84	1st
1968	Alan Mann Racing	Ford Escort TC	C				**CRY**; 2†	**MAL**; 2†	**BRH**; 1	SIL; 4	CRO; 4	**OUL**; 4	**BRH**; 4	**BRH**; 1		1st	84	1st
1969	Alan Mann Racing	Ford Escort TC	C	**BRH**; 3	SIL; 1	SNE; 3	THR; 2	**SIL**; 13	**CRY**; 1†	**MAL**; Ret†	**CRO**; 2	SIL; 12	**OUL**; 2	**BRH**; Ret	BRH; 1	3rd	58	1st
1970	Motor Racing Research	Ford Mustang Boss 302	D	BRH; 1	**SNE**; 1	**THR**; 1	**SIL**; 1	**CRY**; 1†	**SIL**; 12	SIL; 3	**CRO**; 1	**BRH**; 2	**OUL**; 1	**BRH**; 1	BRH	2nd	68	1st
1971	SCA Freight Ltd.	Chevrolet Camaro Z28	D	BRH	SNE	THR	SIL; 2	CRY	**SIL**; 1	**CRO**; 1	**SIL**; Ret	OUL; 3	BRH	MAL	**BRH**; Ret			
1972	SCA Freight Ltd.	Chevrolet Camaro Z28	D	BRH; 1	**OUL**; 2	THR; 1	**SIL**; 1	**CRY**; 7†	BRH; 1	**OUL**; 1	**SIL**; Ret	**MAL**; 1†	**BRH**; 1			3rd	54	1st
1973	SCA European Road Services	Chevrolet Camaro Z28	D	**BRH**; 1	**SIL**; 3	**THR**; 1	THR; 1	**SIL**; 1	ING; 1	**BRH**; 1†	SIL; Ret	**BRH**; 3				1st	60	1st

† Events with 2 races staged for the different classes.

=== Complete Tasman Series results ===
Year	Entrant	Chassis	Engine	1	2	3	4	5	6	7	8	Pos.	Pts
1964	Alec Mildren Racing Pty Ltd	Brabham BT6	Ford 116E 1.5 L4	LEV	PUK	WIG	TER	SAN; 10	WAR; 13	LAK; 4	LON; 9	11th	3
1965	Alec Mildren Racing Pty Ltd	Brabham BT11A	Coventry Climax FPF 2.5 L4	PUK; 2	LEV; 2	WIG; 4	TER	WAR; Ret	SAN; Ret	LON; 8		4th	15
1966	Alec Mildren Racing Pty Ltd	Brabham BT11A	Coventry Climax FPF 2.5 L4	PUK; Ret	LEV; Ret	WIG; Ret	TER; 2	WAR; 3	LAK; 2	SAN; 5	LON; 6	5th	18 (19)
1967	Alec Mildren Racing Pty Ltd	Brabham BT16	Coventry Climax FPF 2.5 L4	PUK; DNS	LEV	WIG; 4	TER	LAK; 3	WAR; 3	SAN; 3	LON; 4	2nd	18
1968	Alec Mildren Racing Pty Ltd	Brabham BT23D	Alfa Romeo T33 2.5 V8	PUK; 2	LEV; Ret	WIG; Ret	TER; 3	SUR; 9	WAR; Ret	SAN; 4	LON; 3	4th	17
1969	Alec Mildren Racing	Mildren Mono	Alfa Romeo T33 2.5 V8	PUK; Ret	LEV; 3	WIG; Ret	TER; 4	LAK; Ret	WAR; 3	SAN; 4		6th	14
1971	Lola Cars Ltd	Lola T192	Chevrolet 5.0 V8	LEV	PUK; Ret	WIG; 4	TER; Ret	WAR; 1	SAN; Ret	SUR; 2		4th	18
1972	Lola Cars Limited	Lola T300	Chevrolet 5.0 V8	PUK; 1	LEV; Ret	WIG	TER	SUR; 2	WAR; 2	SAN; 2	AIR	3rd	27

=== Complete Formula One World Championship results ===
(key)

Year	Entrant	Chassis	Engine	1	2	3	4	5	6	7	8	9	10	11	12	WDC	Pts
1964	John Willment Automobiles	Brabham BT10	Ford 116E 1.5 L4	MON	NED	BEL	FRA	GBR; Ret	GER	AUT	ITA	USA	MEX			NC	0
1965	John Willment Automobiles	Brabham BT11	BRM P56 1.5 V8	RSA; 12	MON; Ret	BEL; Ret	FRA	GBR; 8	NED; 11	GER; Ret	ITA; Ret	USA	MEX			NC	0
1968	Bernard White Racing	BRM P261	BRM P101 3.0 V12	RSA	ESP	MON	BEL	NED	FRA	GBR	GER	ITA; DNQ	CAN	USA	MEX	NC	0

=== Formula One Non-Championship results ===
(key)

Year	Entrant	Chassis	Engine	1	2	3	4	5	6	7	8
1964	John Willment Automobiles	Brabham BT10	Ford 116E 1.5 L4	DMT	NWT	SYR	AIN	INT	SOL	MED; Ret	RAN
1965	John Willment Automobiles	Brabham BT11	BRM P56 1.5 V8	ROC; 4	SYR	SMT; DNS	INT; Ret	MED; 3	RAN		
1967	Brabham Racing Organisation	Brabham BT19	Repco 740 3.0 V8	ROC	SPC	INT	SYR	OUL; Ret	ESP		
1968	Cooper Car Company	Cooper T86B	BRM P101 3.0 V12	ROC	INT; Ret	OUL					
1970	Motor Racing Research	Lola T190 (F5000)	Chevrolet 5.0 V8	ROC	INT; 8	OUL; 9					
1971	Lola Cars	Lola T192 (F5000)	Chevrolet 5.0 V8	ARG	ROC	QUE	SPR	INT; 9	RIN		
1971	Lola Cars	Lola T300 (F5000)	Chevrolet 5.0 V8							OUL; 3	VIC; 11
1972	Lola Cars	Lola T330 (F5000)	Chevrolet 5.0 V8	ROC	BRA	INT	OUL	REP	VIC; DNS		

=== Complete European Formula Two Championship results ===
(key) (Races in bold indicate pole position; races in italics indicate fastest lap)

Year	Entrant	Chassis	Engine	1	2	3	4	5	6	7	8	9	10	Pos.	Pts
1967	Motor Racing Developments	Brabham BT23	Cosworth FVA	SNE; Ret	SIL; 6	NÜR; 12	HOC; 1	TUL; 4	JAR; 10	ZAN; 3	PER; 9	BRH; 4	VAL; 4	2nd	34
1968	The Chequered Flag	McLaren M4A	Cosworth FVA	HOC	THR	JAR	PAL; DNS	TUL; 8	ZAN	PER	HOC	VAL		NC	0

=== Complete European F5000 Championship results ===
(key) (note: results shown in bold indicate pole position; results in italics indicate fastest lap)

Year	Entrant	Chassis	Engine	1	2	3	4	5	6	7	8	9	10	11	12	13	14	15	16	17	18	19	20	Pos.	Pts
1969	Sid Taylor	Lola T142	Chevrolet 5.0 V8	OUL	BRH	BRH; 2	MAL	SIL	MON	KOK	ZAN	SNE	HOC	OUL	BRH									17th	350
1970	Motor Racing Research Ltd	Lola T190	Chevrolet 5.0 V8	OUL	BRH	ZOL; Ret	ZAN; 3	SIL; 2	BRH; 7	CAS; DNS	MAL	**MON**; 3	SIL; 3	MNZ; Ret	AND	SAL	**THR**; 1	**SIL**; 1	**OUL**; 3	SNE	**HOC**; 2	**OUL**; 2	**BRH**; Ret	3rd	52
1971	Lola Cars	Lola T192	Chevrolet 5.0 V8	MAL	SNE; 1	BRH; 2	MON; 1	SIL; 4	CAS; 1	MAL; 3	MNZ; 9	**MAL**; 2												1st	95
1971	Lola Cars	Lola T300	Chevrolet 5.0 V8										**THR**; 3	SIL; 2	**OUL**; 1	**SNE**; Ret	**HOC**; 1	**OUL**; 1	BRH; 2	**BRH**; 2				1st	95
1972	Lola Cars	Lola T330	Chevrolet 5.0 V8	BRH	MAL	SNE	BRH	NIV	SIL	MON	OUL	MAL	BRH	SIL	BRH	OUL	BRH; 3							10th	8

=== Complete Bathurst 500/1000 results ===
Year	Team	Co-drivers	Car	Class	Laps	Pos.	Class pos.
1968	(Australia) Alec Mildren Racing	(Australia) John French	Alfa Romeo 1750 GTV	E	NA	DSQ	DSQ
1974	(Australia) Bob Jane Racing	(Australia) Bob Jane	Holden LH Torana SL/R 5000	3001 – 6000cc	7	DNF	DNF
1975	(Australia) Ron Hodgson Racing	(Australia) Bob Morris	Holden LH Torana SL/R 5000 L34	D	161	2nd	2nd
1976	(Australia) Craven Mild Racing	(Australia) Allan Grice	Holden LH Torana SL/R 5000 L34	3001cc - 6000cc	72	DNF	DNF
1977	(Australia) Craven Mild Racing	(Australia) Allan Grice	Holden LX Torana SS A9X Hatchback	3001cc - 6000cc	140	DNF	DNF
1983	(Australia) JPS Team BMW	(New Zealand) Jim Richards	BMW 635 CSi	A	6	DNF	DNF

Sporting positions
Preceded by Roberto Bussinello; Ralph Sachs	Winner of the Sandown 500; 1965; With: Kevin Bartlett	Succeeded by Tony Roberts; Bob Watson
Preceded by John Fitzpatrick	British Saloon Car Championship; Champion; 1967-1968	Succeeded by Alec Poole
Preceded by Peter Gethin	European F5000 Championship; Champion; 1971	Succeeded by Gijs van Lennep
Preceded by Niel Allen	Winner of the New Zealand Grand Prix; 1972	Succeeded by John McCormack
Preceded by Bill McGovern	British Saloon Car Championship; Champion; 1973	Succeeded by Bernard Unett
