= Bill McGovern (racing driver) =

British racing driver (born 1937)

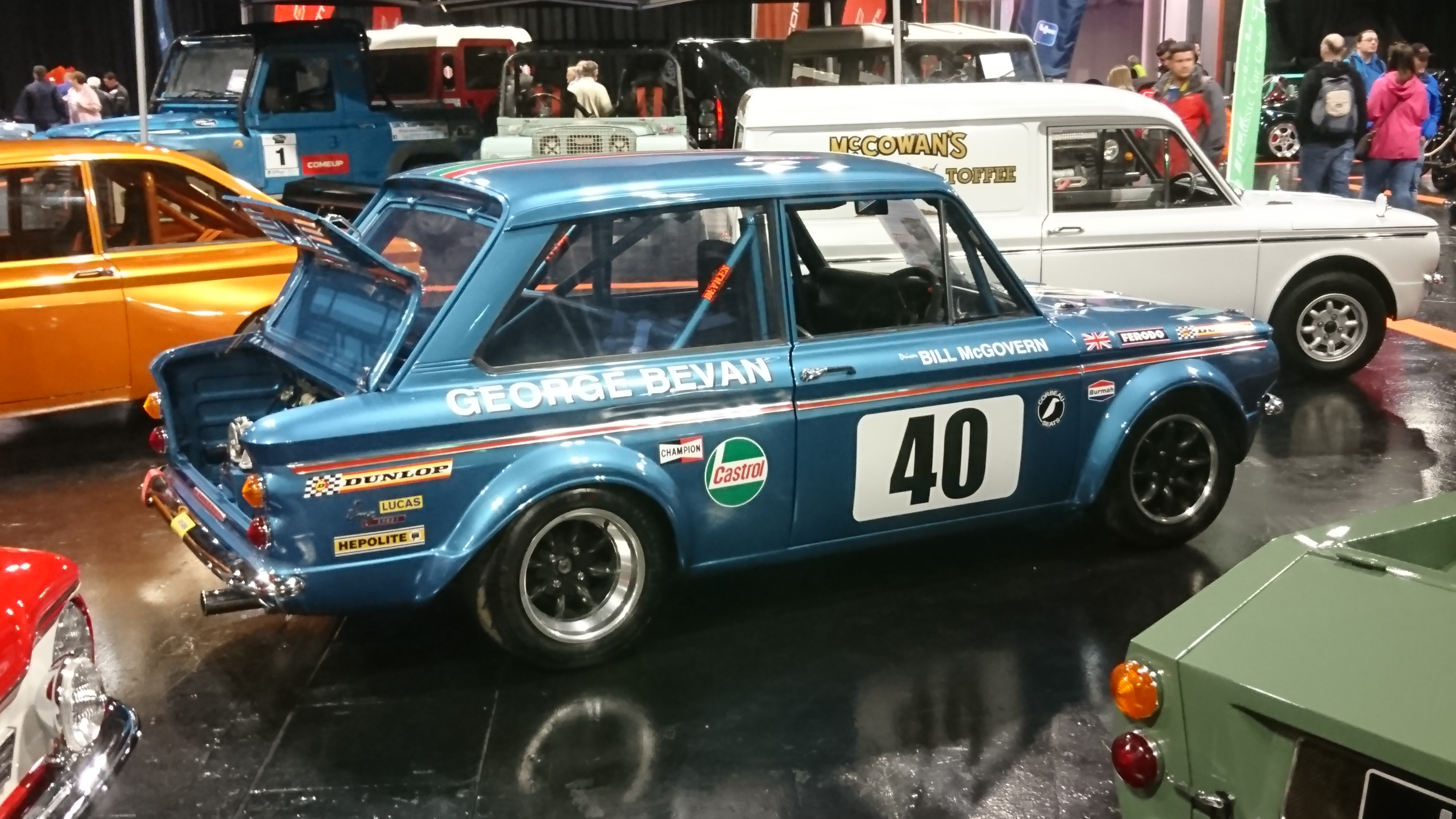
- McGovern's Championship-winning Sunbeam Imp
- Nationality: (United Kingdom) British
- Born: William McGovern; 2 January 1937 (age 89) Sligo, Ireland
- Died: 7 February 2026 (aged 89)
- Retired: 1989

British Saloon Car Championship
- Years active: 1965–1967, 1969–1974
- Teams: Flintstone Racing; Paul Emery; George Bevan
- Starts: 54
- Wins: 1 (31 in class)
- Poles: 0
- Fastest laps: 35
- Best finish: 1st in 1970, 1971 and 1972

Championship titles
- 1970, 1971, 1972 1970, 1971, 1972: British Saloon Car Championship; BSCC - Class A

William McGovern (born 2 January 1937) was a British racing driver.

McGovern is best known for becoming the first person to win three British Touring Car Championship (then known as the British Saloon Car Championship) driver titles. He won three consecutive titles between 1970 and 1972 with a George Bevan-prepared Sunbeam Imp.

== Racing record ==
=== Complete British Saloon Car Championship results ===
(key) (Races in bold indicate pole position; races in italics indicate fastest lap.)

Year	Team	Car	Class	1	2	3	4	5	6	7	8	9	10	11	12	13	DC	Pts	Class
1965	Flintstone Racing	Austin Mini Cooper S	B	BRH; Ret	OUL	SNE	GOO	SIL	CRY	BRH	OUL						NC	0	NC
1966	Paul Emery	Hillman Imp	A	SNE; Ret	GOO	SIL; Ret	CRY ovr:5† cls:2†	BRH	BRH ovr:16 cls:5	OUL; Ret†	BRH						24th	6	6th
1967	Paul Emery	Hillman Imp	A	BRH; Ret	SNE	SIL	SIL; Ret	MAL	SIL	SIL	BRH	OUL	BRH				NC	0	NC
1969	George Bevan	Sunbeam Imp	A	BRH	SIL	SNE	THR	SIL	CRY	MAL	CRO	SIL	OUL	BRH	BRH; Ret		NC	0	NC
1970	George Bevan	Sunbeam Imp	A	BRH; Ret	SNE ovr:13 cls:1	THR ovr:17 cls:1	SIL ovr:11 cls:1	CRY ovr:3† cls:1†	SIL ovr:15 cls:1	SIL ovr:16 cls:1	CRO ovr:9 cls:1	BRH ovr:23 cls:2	OUL ovr:19 cls:2	BRH ovr:19 cls:1	BRH		1st	72	1st
1971	George Bevan	Sunbeam Imp	A	BRH ovr:11 cls:1	OUL ovr:2 cls:1	THR; Ret	SIL ovr:15 cls:1	CRY ovr:2† cls:1†	SIL; Ret	CRO ovr:9 cls:1	SIL ovr:14 cls:1	OUL ovr:10 cls:1	BRH ovr:10 cls:1	MAL ovr:7† cls:1†	BRH ovr:13 cls:1		1st	81	1st
1972	George Bevan	Sunbeam Imp	A	BRH ovr:7 cls:1	OUL ovr:12 cls:1	THR ovr:9 cls:1	SIL ovr:16 cls:1	CRY ovr:5† cls:1†	BRH ovr:12 cls:1	OUL ovr:8 cls:1	SIL ovr:14 cls:1	MAL ovr:6† cls:1†	BRH ovr:13 cls:1				1st	63	1st
1973	George Bevan	Sunbeam Imp	A	BRH; Ret	SIL ovr:11 cls:1	THR; Ret	THR; Ret	SIL ovr:11 cls:1	ING; DNS	BRH ovr:1† cls:1†	SIL ovr:11 cls:1	BRH; Ret					7th	36	2nd
1974	George Bevan	Volkswagen Passat TS	A	MAL	BRH; Ret	SIL ovr:? cls:?	OUL	THR	SIL ovr:? cls:?	THR	BRH; Ret	ING	BRH	OUL	SNE	BRH	NC	0	NC

† Events with 2 races staged for the different classes.

Sporting positions
Preceded by Alec Poole	British Touring Car Champion; 1970–1972	Succeeded by Frank Gardner
