= 1971 British Saloon Car Championship =

14th season of the British Touring Car Championship

Seasons
- ← 1970 1972 →

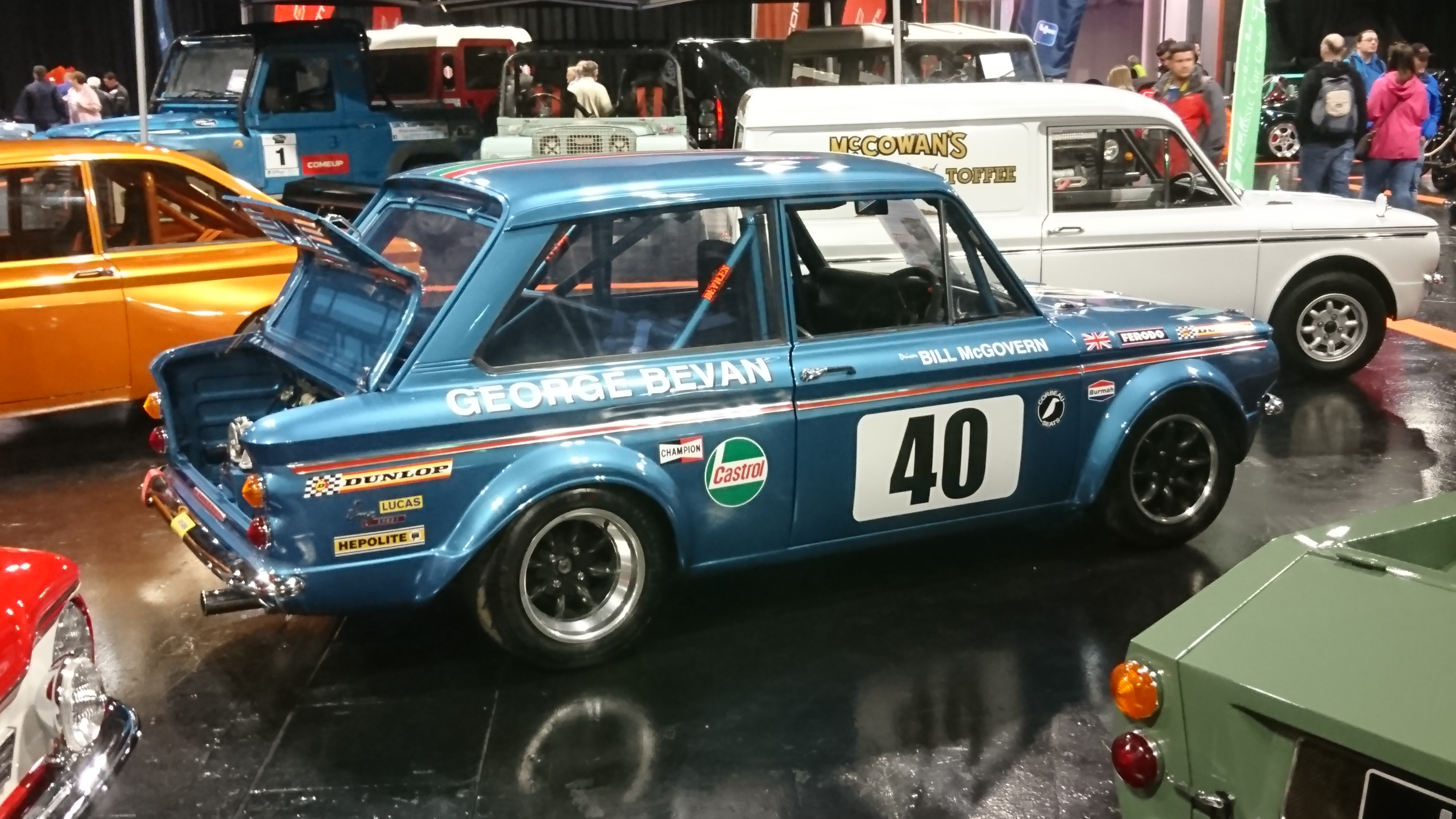
Pictured in 2017, Bill McGovern 's Hillman/Sunbeam Imp, the winner of the 1971 British Saloon Car Championship.

The 1971 RAC British Saloon Car Championship was the 14th season of the championship. Bill McGovern won his second title, driving a Sunbeam Imp.

== Calendar & Winners ==
All races were held in the United Kingdom. Overall winners in bold.

Round		Circuit	Date	Class A Winner	Class B Winner	Class C Winner	Class D Winner
NC		Mallory Park, Leicestershire	14 March	None (no entries?)	(United Kingdom) Mike Chittenden	(United Kingdom) **Graham Birrell**	None (no entries?)
1		Brands Hatch, Kent	21 March	(United Kingdom) Bill McGovern	(United Kingdom) Vince Woodman	(United Kingdom) **John Fitzpatrick**	(Australia) Brian Muir
2	A	Oulton Park, Cheshire	9 April	(United Kingdom) Bill McGovern	(United Kingdom) **Dave Matthews**	Not contested.	
2	B	Snetterton Motor Racing Circuit, Norfolk	9 April	Not contested.		(United Kingdom) John Fitzpatrick	(Australia) **Brian Muir**
3		Thruxton Circuit, Hampshire	12 April	(United Kingdom) Bernard Unett	(United Kingdom) Dave Matthews	(United Kingdom) Lawrie Hickman	(Australia) **Brian Muir**
4		Silverstone Circuit, Northamptonshire	8 May	(United Kingdom) Bill McGovern	(United Kingdom) Dave Matthews	(United Kingdom) John Fitzpatrick	(Australia) **Brian Muir**
5	A	Crystal Palace Circuit, London	30 May	(United Kingdom) Bill McGovern	(United Kingdom) **Vince Woodman**	Not contested.	
5	B	Crystal Palace Circuit, London	30 May	Not contested.		(United Kingdom) John Bloomfield	(Australia) **Brian Muir**
6		Silverstone Circuit, Northamptonshire	5 June	(United Kingdom) John Turner	(United Kingdom) Dave Matthews	(United Kingdom) John Fitzpatrick	(Australia) **Frank Gardner**
7		Croft Circuit, North Yorkshire	11 July	(United Kingdom) Bill McGovern	(United Kingdom) Dave Matthews	(United Kingdom) Trevor Taylor	(Australia) **Frank Gardner**
8		Silverstone Circuit, Northamptonshire	17 July	(United Kingdom) Bill McGovern	(United Kingdom) Dave Matthews	(United Kingdom) Graham Birrell	(United Kingdom) **Gerry Birrell**
9		Oulton Park, Cheshire	22 August	(United Kingdom) Bill McGovern	(United Kingdom) Dave Matthews	(United Kingdom) John Fitzpatrick	(Australia) **Brian Muir**
10		Brands Hatch, Kent	30 August	(United Kingdom) Bill McGovern	(United Kingdom) Vince Woodman	(United Kingdom) **John Fitzpatrick**	(United Kingdom) Dennis Leech
11	A	Mallory Park, Leicestershire	26 September	Not contested.		(United Kingdom) John Fitzpatrick	(Australia) **Brian Muir**
11	B	Mallory Park, Leicestershire	26 September	(United Kingdom) Bill McGovern	(United Kingdom) **Jon Mowatt**	Not contested.	
12		Brands Hatch, Kent	24 October	(United Kingdom) Bill McGovern	(United Kingdom) Dave Matthews	(United Kingdom) John Bloomfield	(United Kingdom) **Gerry Birrell**

== Championship results ==
Driver's championship
Pos.	Driver	Car	Points
1	(United Kingdom) Bill McGovern	Sunbeam Imp	–
2	(United Kingdom) Vince Woodman	Ford Escort 1300 GT	–
3	(United Kingdom) John Fitzpatrick	Ford Escort RS 1600	–
4	(Australia) Frank Gardner	Chevrolet Camaro	–
