= 1973 British Saloon Car Championship =

16th season of the British Touring Car Championship

Seasons
- ← 1972 1974 →

The 1973 RAC British Saloon Car Championship was the 16th season of the championship. Frank Gardner became the second driver to win three BTCC titles, driving a Chevrolet Camaro.

== Calendar & Winners ==
All races were held in the United Kingdom. Overall winners in bold.

Round		Circuit	Date	Class A Winner	Class B Winner	Class C Winner	Class D Winner
1		Brands Hatch, Kent	18 March	(United Kingdom) Les Nash	(United Kingdom) Vince Woodman	(United Kingdom) Dave Brodie	(Australia) **Frank Gardner**
2		Silverstone Circuit, Northamptonshire	8 April	(United Kingdom) Bill McGovern	(United Kingdom) Vince Woodman	(United Kingdom) Andy Rouse	(Australia) **Brian Muir**
3		Thruxton Circuit, Hampshire	23 April	(United Kingdom) Melvyn Adams	(United Kingdom) Peter Hanson	(United Kingdom) Dave Brodie	(Australia) **Frank Gardner**
4		Thruxton Circuit, Hampshire	28 May	(United Kingdom) James Burrows	(United Kingdom) Peter Hanson	(United Kingdom) Dave Brodie	(Australia) **Frank Gardner**
5		Silverstone Circuit, Northamptonshire	14 July	(United Kingdom) Bill McGovern	(United Kingdom) Vince Woodman	(United Kingdom) Jonathan Buncombe	(Australia) **Frank Gardner**
6		Ingliston, Edinburgh	19 August	(United Kingdom) Les Nash	(United Kingdom) Peter Hanson	(United Kingdom) Jonathan Buncombe	(Australia) **Frank Gardner**
7*	A	Brands Hatch, Kent	22 August	Not contested.	(United Kingdom) Vince Woodman	(United Kingdom) Andy Rouse	(Australia) **Frank Gardner**
7*	B	Brands Hatch, Kent	22 August	(United Kingdom) **Bill McGovern**	Not contested.		
8		Silverstone Circuit, Northamptonshire	23 September	(United Kingdom) Bill McGovern	(United Kingdom) Peter Hanson	(Spain) Jose de Uriarte (France) Hervé le Guellec	(United Kingdom) **Derek Bell** (Austria) **Harald Ertl**
9		Brands Hatch, Kent	21 October	(United Kingdom) Les Nash	(United Kingdom) Vince Woodman	(United Kingdom) Andy Rouse	(Australia) **Brian Muir**

- Group 1 cars raced alongside Class A at round 7. (United Kingdom) Holman 'Les' Blackburn won the class.

== Championship results ==
Driver's championship
Pos.	Driver	Car	Points
1	(Australia) Frank Gardner	Chevrolet Camaro Z28	66
2	(United Kingdom) Andy Rouse	Ford Escort RS 1600	45
3	(United Kingdom) Peter Hanson	Ford Escort 1300 BDA	45
4	(United Kingdom) Vince Woodman	Ford Escort 1300 BDA	43
