= Gerry Marshall =

British racing driver (1941–2005)

- Nationality: (United Kingdom) British
- Born: 16 November 1941 St Neots, Huntingdonshire, England
- Died: 21 April 2005 (aged 63) Silverstone, Northamptonshire, England

British Saloon / Touring Car Championship
- Years active: 1965, 1970, 1973–1974, 1976–1979, 1987, 1989
- Teams: Newtune Ltd; Shaw & Kilburn Ltd; London Sportscar Centre; The Vauxhall Motorist Racing with Capital Motors; Dealer Team Vauxhall; Team Triplex Gerry Marshall Racing Marshall Asquith Racing Marsh Plant Hire
- Starts: 63
- Wins: 0 (5 in class)
- Poles: 1
- Fastest laps: 7
- Best finish: 3rd in 1976

Championship titles
- 1971 1976: Castrol Escort Mexico Challenge Series; British Saloon Car Championship - Class C

Gerald Dallas Royston Marshall (16 November 1941 – 21 April 2005) was a British racing driver. He was commonly referred to by the nickname Big Gerry. According to a 2002 edition of Motor Sport Magazine poll, he was one of the best drivers of all time. According to the 28 August 2019 edition of Motorsport News, he is the United Kingdom's number one British motorsport hero. He was awarded the BARC Gold Medal in 2002, the first saloon car driver to be presented with the honour and was a life member of the prestigious BRDC. He took 625 overall and class wins and countless championship wins throughout his motor racing career.

Marshall was also well known in motoring circles for his successful car dealership, Marshall Wingfield, originally located on the Finchley Road, London, before moving to Brook Street in Tring and through his adult life lived in Harrow, Chiswell Green, Bricket Wood, Hemel Hempstead, Northchurch, Aston Clinton and Pitstone.

Marshall's ashes are buried at St. Leonards Church in Southoe, where his grandparents are also buried - he was relocated locally during the Second World War.

== Career ==
Marshall's professional driving career spans five decades, in 2000 chalking up his 600th win in a race at Snetterton Motor Racing Circuit, Norfolk in an Aston Martin DB4. His first Sprint victory was in 1963 driving a Mini, with his first race win following in 1964 (again in a Mini) and his last (and 625th) on 11 September 2004.

Marshall is probably best remembered for his flamboyant and crowd-pleasing style during the 1970s driving for Dealer Team Vauxhall in the racing Firenzas "Old Nail" and "Baby Bertha", and also the V8 Holden-Repco Ventora, "Big Bertha". He also won the 1971 Escort Mexico championship, beating future Formula 1 World Champion Jody Scheckter and finished second in the 1974 Avon Tour of Britain driving for the same team as the equally respected rally driver Roger Clark.

Marshall's style has been described as "sideways, on-the-edge cornering that was to distinguish his driving in any car, large or small, front or rear drive." This outward appearance belied an extraordinary cool-headed ability and intelligence behind the wheel.

Marshall's first biography, published in 1978, is titled Only Here For The Beer and a tribute edition was re-issued shortly after his death and his new biography (published by Haynes and written by Jeremy Walton and Gregor Marshall) was released in April 2010.

Marshall died of a heart related illness whilst testing the ex-Richard Petty's IROC Chevrolet Camaro at Silverstone. His son, Gregor, is also a race driver and he also has two daughters.

== Racing record ==
=== Complete British Saloon / Touring Car Championship results ===
(key) (Races in bold indicate pole position; races in italics indicate fastest lap.)

Year	Team	Car	Class	1	2	3	4	5	6	7	8	9	10	11	12	13	Pos.	Pts	Class
1965	Newtune Ltd.	Austin Mini Cooper S	A	BRH; Ret	OUL	SNE; 16	GOO	SIL ?	CRY; 5†	BRH	OUL						12th	14	4th
1970	Shaw & Kilburn Ltd.	Vauxhall Viva GT	C	BRH; Ret	SNE; DNQ	THR; 12	SIL; 7	CRY; 10†	SIL; 9	SIL; 28	CRO; 16	BRH; 13	OUL; 8	BRH	BRH		37th	6th	12th
1973	United Service Garage Portsmouth	Vauxhall Firenza Magnum 2300	D	BRH	SIL	THR	THR	SIL	ING	BRH	SIL; DNQ	BRH					NC	0	NC
1974	London Sportscar Centre	Chevrolet Camaro Z28	D	MAL; Ret†	BRH; DNS												33rd	4	NC
1974	Capel Continental Expresses Stock Cars Ltd.	Vauxhall Firenza 2300	B			SIL; Ret	OUL										33rd	4	11th
1974	The Vauxhall Motorist Racing with Capital Motors	Vauxhall Firenza Magnum 2300	B					THR; 9	SIL; Ret	THR ?	BRH; 12	ING; Ret†	BRH	OUL	SNE; 5†	BRH	33rd	4	11th
1976	Dealer Team Vauxhall	Vauxhall Firenza Magnum 2300	C	BRH; 4	SIL; 14	OUL ?†	THR; 4	THR; 7	SIL; 5†	BRH; 3	MAL; 6†	SNE; 3†	**BRH**; 2				**3rd**	**58**	**1st**
1977	Dealer Team Vauxhall	Vauxhall Firenza Magnum 2300	C	SIL; 6	BRH; 4	OUL ?†	THR; 8	SIL; 9	THR; 8	DON; Ret†	SIL; 6	DON; 6†	BRH; 4	THR; 6	BRH; Ret		7th	27	**3rd**
1978	Triplex Safety Glass	Ford Capri II 3.0s	D	SIL; 2	OUL; Ret†	THR	BRH; 6†	SIL; 4†	DON; Ret†	MAL; Ret†	BRH; 18	DON; 6†	BRH	THR			23rd	14	8th
1978	Triplex Safety Glass	Ford Capri III 3.0s	D												OUL; Ret†		23rd	14	8th
1979	Team Triplex with Esso and Motor	Triumph Dolomite Sprint	C	SIL	OUL; 8	THR; 17	SIL; 9	DON; 9	SIL; Ret	MAL	DON	BRH ?	THR ?	SNE	OUL; Ret		17th	23	5th
1987	AGK Motorsport	Toyota Corolla GT	D	SIL	OUL	THR	THR	SIL	SIL	BRH	SNE	DON	OUL; 9‡*	DON	SIL		NC*	0*	NC*
1989	BBR Motorsport	BMW M3	B	OUL	SIL	THR	DON; 7‡	THR	SIL	SIL	BRH	SNE	BRH	BIR	DON	SIL	35th	6	9th

† Events with 2 races staged for the different classes.

‡ Endurance driver.

- Endurance driver – not eligible for points.

=== Complete Bathurst 1000 results ===
Year	Team	Co-driver	Car	Class	Laps	Pos.	Class pos.
1977	(Australia) Bill Patterson Racing	(South Africa) Basil van Rooyen	Holden LX Torana SS A9X Hatchback	3001cc - 6000cc	107	DNF	DNF

=== Complete Spa 24 Hours results ===
Year	Team	Co-drivers	Car	Class	Laps	Pos.	Class pos.
1977	(United Kingdom) Dealer Team Vauxhall	(Australia) Peter Brock	Vauxhall Firenza Magnum 2300	-2500	276	2nd	1st
1978	(United Kingdom) Triplex Allam Motor Services	(United Kingdom) Jeff Allam (United Kingdom) Stuart Patterson	Ford Capri III 3.0s	+2500	?	DNF	DNF
