= Chris Craft (racing driver) =

British racing driver (1939–2021)

- Born: 17 November 1939; Porthleven, Cornwall, England, UK
- Died: 20 February 2021 (aged 81); Chigwell, Essex, England, UK

Formula One World Championship career
- Nationality: (United Kingdom) British
- Active years: 1971
- Team: non-works Brabham
- Entries: 2 (1 start)
- Championships: 0
- Wins: 0
- Podiums: 0
- Career points: 0
- Pole positions: 0
- Fastest laps: 0
- First entry: 1971 Canadian Grand Prix
- Last entry: 1971 United States Grand Prix

Christopher Adrian Craft (17 November 1939 – 20 February 2021) was a British racing driver who competed in many different forms of motor sport.

== Biography ==
Craft was born in Porthleven, Cornwall and began his career in 1962, with a Ford Anglia and became recognised as a leading saloon car racer, particularly with the Team Broadspeed Escort which he campaigned from 1968 to 1970. Having also previously driven a Tecno in Formula Three, he moved to sports cars from 1968, initially with a Chevron and then joined forces with Alain de Cadenet to drive his Porsche 908 and McLaren M8C.

It was this association that led to his participation in two World Championship Formula One Grands Prix, in 1971, driving a Brabham BT33 prepared by Cadenet's team Ecurie Evergreen, but he failed to score a championship point. He did not qualify for his first World Championship race (the 1971 Canadian Grand Prix at Mosport Park) but would have been able to start the race following the withdrawal of two other drivers due to accidents in the raceday warm-up sessions. However, his own car suffered engine trouble, denying him the opportunity. His second Grand Prix, at Watkins Glen ended with a suspension failure and tyre problems during the race.

Craft continued to compete in many other forms of motor racing, including saloon cars, notably with a Ford Capri; sports cars, including a period with the Dome team in the early 1980s; Formula 3 and Formula 5000. Craft won the 1973 European Sportscar Championship in a Lola T92. One of the highlights of his career was a third-place finish in the 1976 24 Hours of Le Mans.

After his race career, Craft started the Light Car Company with F1 designer Gordon Murray to build the Light Car Company Rocket.

== Racing record ==
=== Complete British Saloon Car Championship results ===
(key) (Races in bold indicate pole position; races in italics indicate fastest lap.)

Year	Team	Car	Class	1	2	3	4	5	6	7	8	9	10	11	12	13	14	15	Pos.	Pts	Class
1964	Chris Craft	Ford Cortina Lotus	B	SNE ?	GOO; Ret	OUL ?	AIN; 7	SIL; Ret	CRY; 4†	BRH	OUL								27th	2	11th
1964	Superspeed Conversions Ltd.	Ford Anglia Super	A						CRY; 6†	BRH; DSQ	OUL; Ret								27th	2	NC
1965	R. Trustham	Ford Anglia Super	B	BRH; DSQ	OUL	SNE	GOO	SIL ?	CRY; 3†	BRH; DNS	OUL; 8								25th	6	9th
1966	Superspeed Conversions Ltd.	Ford Anglia Super	B	SNE; 6	GOO; 6	SIL; Ret	CRY; Ret†	BRH; Ret	BRH; Ret	OUL; 1†	BRH; Ret								8th	24	**3rd**
1967	Superspeed Conversions Ltd.	Ford Anglia Super	B	BRH	SNE	SIL	SIL	MAL	SIL	SIL; Ret	BRH; Ret	OUL; Ret†	BRH; Ret						NC	0	NC
1968	Team Broadspeed	Ford Anglia	A	BRH; Ret	THR; 5	SIL; 10	CRY; Ret†	MAL; Ret†											8th	38	4th
1968	Team Broadspeed	Ford Escort 1300 GT	B						BRH; 12	SIL; 10	CRO; Ret	OUL; 9	BRH	BRH; 7					8th	38	5th
1969	Team Broadspeed	Ford Escort 1300 GT	B	BRH; Ret	SIL; Ret	SNE; 8	THR; 4	SIL; 3	CRY; 2†	MAL; 2†	CRO; 12	SIL; 5	OUL; 7	BRH; 6	BRH; 7				**2nd**	**67**	**1st**
1970	Team Broadspeed	Ford Escort TC	C	BRH; 2	SNE; 4	THR; Ret	SIL; 4	CRY; 3†	SIL; 4	SIL; 26	CRO; 3	BRH; 11	OUL; 5	BRH; 3	BRH				5th	60	**1st**
1974	Wisharts Garages	Ford Capri 3000 GT	C	MAL	BRH	SIL	OUL	THR	SIL	THR	BRH	ING	BRH	OUL	SNE ?				29th	7	8th
1974	Shellsport	Triumph Dolomite Sprint	B													BRH; 9			29th	7	12th
1975	Wisharts Garages	Ford Capri 3000 GT	C	MAL	BRH	OUL	THR; 11	SIL	BRH	THR	SIL	MAL	SNE	SIL	ING; Ret†	BRH ?†	OUL; 5	BRH	23rd	16	7th
1976	Tricentrol / Hammonds Sauce Group	Ford Capri II 3.0s	D	BRH; 2	SIL; DSQ	OUL	THR; 3	THR; 3	SIL; DNS	BRH; 4	MAL; 2†	SNE; 4†	BRH; Ret						10th	28	**3rd**
1977	Hammonds Sauce Group	Ford Capri II 3.0s	D	SIL; Ret	BRH; DNS	OUL; 3†	THR; 6	SIL; 4	THR; 1	DON	SIL; 2	DON; 2†	BRH	THR; 3	BRH; 2				8th	24	**2nd**
1978	Gordon Spice Group	Ford Capri III 3.0s	D	SIL; Ret	OUL; 3†	THR; Ret	BRH; Ret†	SIL; 2†	**DON**; 1†	MAL; 4†	BRH; 4	DON; 4†	BRH; 5	THR; 2	OUL; Ret†				10th	40	**3rd**
1979	Gordon Spice Racing	Ford Capri III 3.0s	D	SIL; 2	OUL; 3†	THR; 16	SIL; 5	DON; 3	SIL; 2	MAL ?†	DON; 3	BRH; 2	THR ?	SNE	OUL				10th	40	**3rd**

† Events with 2 races staged for the different classes.

=== Complete Formula One results ===
(key)

Year	Entrant	Chassis	Engine	1	2	3	4	5	6	7	8	9	10	11	WDC	Points
1971	Ecurie Evergreen	Brabham BT33	Cosworth V8	RSA	ESP	MON	NED	FRA	GBR	GER	AUT	ITA	CAN; DNQ	USA; Ret	NC	0
