= Stuart Graham (motorcyclist) =

British motorcycle racer and racing driver (born 1942)

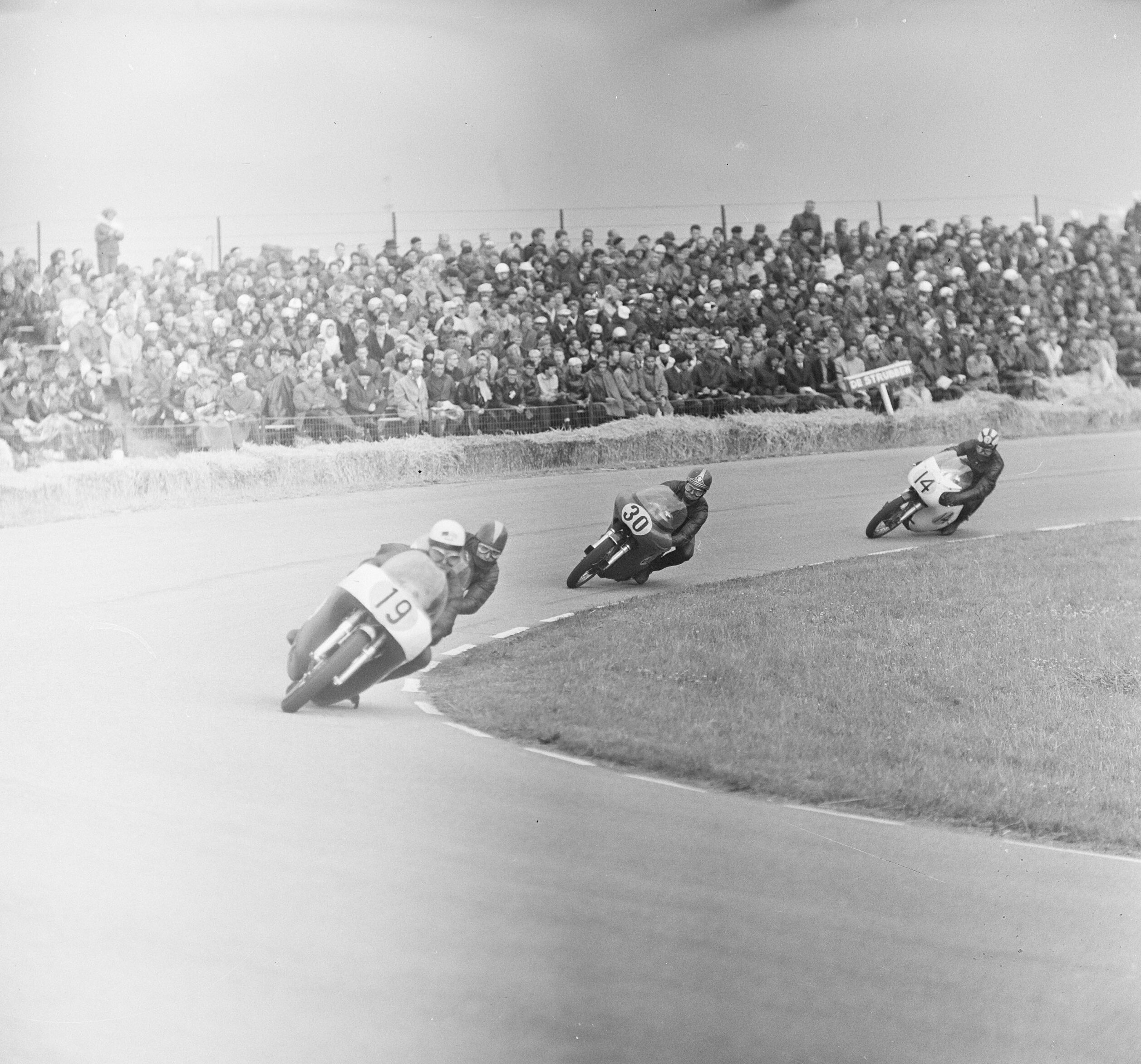
- Race at Dutch TT in 1966, Stuart Graham number 19, Silvio Grassetti 30 and John Cooper 14.
- Nationality: British
- Born: 9 January 1942 (age 84); West Kirby, Cheshire, England
Motorcycle racing career statistics
Grand Prix motorcycle racing
Active years	1962, 1966–1967
First race	1962 250cc Ulster Grand Prix
Last race	1967 125cc Japanese Grand Prix
First win	1967 Isle of Man 50cc Ultra-Lightweight TT
Last win	1967 125cc Finnish Grand Prix
Team(s)	Honda, Suzuki
Championships	0
Starts / Wins / Podiums / Poles / F. laps / Points; 23 / 2 / 14 / N/A / 1 / 29

Leslie Stuart Graham (born 9 January 1942) is a British former Grand Prix motorcycle road racer and Saloon car racing specialist.

Graham is the son of the 1949 500cc world champion, Leslie Graham.

Graham started racing in 1961 on a 125 cc Honda Benly Sports, followed by spells with Bill Webster and on Syd Lawton's Aermacchis. He also rode Bultacos, later selling his half-share in a garage to fund his full-time racing using a 350 cc AJS 7R and a 500 cc Matchless G50 for the 'classic' races.

Graham's big break came when he was signed for the Honda factory team in July 1966, and later rode for Suzuki.

Graham's best season was in 1967 when he won two Grand Prix races and finished the year in third place in both the 50cc and the 125cc world championships.

In the early 1970s, Graham began car racing in Saloon classes, retiring in 1980 to concentrate on his business interests including a Honda dealership. Again reviving his racing in 1986, Graham has continued to appear in occasional historic car events.

== Racing record ==
=== Complete British Saloon Car Championship results ===
(key) (Races in bold indicate pole position; races in italics indicate fastest lap.)

Year	Team	Car	Class	1	2	3	4	5	6	7	8	9	10	11	12	13	14	15	Pos.	Pts	Class
1974	Team Castrol	Chevrolet Camaro Z28	D	**MAL**; 1†	BRH; 1	**SIL**; 1	OUL; 1	**THR**; 2	**SIL**; DSQ	**THR**; Ret	BRH; 1	ING	**BRH**; 10†						**3rd**	**64**	**1st**
1974	Fabergé Racing	Chevrolet Camaro Z28	D											OUL; 1	SNE; 1	BRH; 1			**3rd**	**64**	**1st**
1975	Fabergé Racing	Chevrolet Camaro Z28	D	MAL; 2†	**BRH**; 1	**OUL**; 1†	**THR**; Ret	SIL; 2	BRH; Ret†	**THR**; 1	SIL; 1†	MAL; 1†	**SNE**; 1	**SIL**; 1	ING; Ret†	**BRH**; Ret†	**OUL**; Ret	**BRH**; 1	**3rd**	**78**	**1st**
1977	Fabergé Racing	Ford Capri II 3.0s	D	SIL; 4	BRH; Ret	OUL; 5†	THR; 7	SIL; 1	THR; 5	DON; 1†	SIL; 4	DON; Ret†	BRH; 6	THR ?	BRH ?				10th	20	**3rd**
1978	Fabergé Racing	Ford Capri III 3.0s	D	SIL; Ret	OUL; 2†	THR; 3	BRH; 3†	SIL ?†	DON; Ret†	MAL	BRH; Ret	DON ?†	BRH ?	THR; 3	OUL; 4†				15th	23	5th
1979	Fabergé Racing Lee Jeans	Ford Capri III 3.0s	D	SIL; 7	OUL; 2†	THR; 8	SIL; Ret	DON; 5	SIL; Ret	MAL; Ret†	DON; 4	BRH; Ret	THR	SNE	OUL; 1†				17th	23	5th
1980	Stuart Graham	Ford Capri III 3.0s	D	MAL	OUL; Ret†	THR	SIL	SIL	BRH	MAL	BRH	THR	SIL						NC	0	NC
1981	Gordon Spice Racing	Ford Capri III 3.0s	D	MAL; Ret†	SIL ?	OUL	THR	BRH	SIL	SIL	DON	BRH	THR	SIL					NC	0	NC

† Events with 2 races staged for the different classes.
