= 1976 British Touring Car Championship =

Touring car racing championship

Seasons
- ← 1975 1977 →

The 1976 RAC Keith Prowse British Touring Car Championship was the 19th season of the series. That year saw a change in the class structure, with a limit of 3000cc engines being brought in, to stop the large American V8 cars competing in the championship. Bernard Unett regained the drivers title he last won in 1974, again driving a now renamed Chrysler Avenger GT.

== Classes ==
Cars competed in four engine capacity classes:

- Class A - 1300cc
- Class B - 1600cc
- Class C - 2000cc
- Class D - 3000cc

== Calendar and winners ==
All races were held in the United Kingdom. Overall winners in bold.

| Round | | Circuit | Date | Class A winner | Class B winner | Class C winner | Class D winner |
|---|---|---|---|---|---|---|---|
| 1 | | Brands Hatch, Kent | 14 March | (United Kingdom) Bernard Unett | (United Kingdom) Win Percy | (United Kingdom) Gerry Marshall | (United Kingdom) **Gordon Spice** |
| 2 | | Silverstone Circuit, Northamptonshire | 11 April | (United Kingdom) Bernard Unett | (United Kingdom) Win Percy | (United Kingdom) Martin Thomas | (United Kingdom) **Gordon Spice** |
| 3* | A | Oulton Park, Cheshire | 16 April | Not contested. | (United Kingdom) Win Percy | (United Kingdom) Andy Rouse | (United Kingdom) **Tom Walkinshaw** |
| 3* | B | Oulton Park, Cheshire | 16 April | (United Kingdom) **Bernard Unett** | Not contested. | | |
| 4 | | Thruxton Circuit, Hampshire | 19 April | (United Kingdom) Bernard Unett | (United Kingdom) Win Percy | (United Kingdom) Gerry Marshall | (United Kingdom) **Tom Walkinshaw** |
| 5 | | Thruxton Circuit, Hampshire | 9 May | (United Kingdom) Bernard Unett | (United Kingdom) Win Percy | (United Kingdom) Andy Rouse | (United Kingdom) **Tom Walkinshaw** |
| 6 | | Silverstone Circuit, Northamptonshire | 31 May | (United Kingdom) Bernard Unett | (United Kingdom) Win Percy | (United Kingdom) Dave Brodie | (United Kingdom) **Gordon Spice** |
| 7 | | Brands Hatch, Kent | 18 July | (United Kingdom) Bernard Unett | (United Kingdom) Barrie Williams | (United Kingdom) Derek Bell | (United Kingdom) **Vince Woodman** |
| 8 | A | Mallory Park, Leicestershire | 31 July | (United Kingdom) Bernard Unett | (United Kingdom) **Win Percy** | Not contested. | |
| 8 | B | Mallory Park, Leicestershire | 31 July | Not contested. | | (United Kingdom) Gerry Marshall | (United Kingdom) **Tom Walkinshaw** |
| 9 | A | Snetterton Motor Racing Circuit, Norfolk | 29 August | (United Kingdom) Bernard Unett | (United Kingdom) **Win Percy** | Not contested. | |
| 9 | B | Snetterton Motor Racing Circuit, Norfolk | 29 August | Not contested. | | (United Kingdom) Andy Rouse | (United Kingdom) **Gordon Spice** |
| 10 | | Brands Hatch, Kent | 24 October | (United Kingdom) Bernard Unett | (United Kingdom) Win Percy | (United Kingdom) Gerry Marshall | (United Kingdom) **Colin Vandervell** |

- Production cars raced alongside Class A at round 3. (United Kingdom) John Brindley won the class.

== Championship results ==
Driver's championship
| Pos. | Driver | Car | Points |
|---|---|---|---|
| 1 | (United Kingdom) Bernard Unett | Hillman Avenger 1300; Chrysler Avenger 1300 GT | 90 |
| 2 | (United Kingdom) Win Percy | Toyota Celica GT | 81 |
| 3 | (United Kingdom) Gerry Marshall | Vauxhall Firenza Magnum 2300 | 58 |
| 3 | (United Kingdom) Gordon Spice | Ford Capri II 3.0 | 58 |
| 5 | (United Kingdom) Tom Walkinshaw | Ford Capri II 3.0 | 53 |
