= Bernard Unett =

British racing driver (1936–2000)

- Nationality: (United Kingdom) British
- Born: William Bernard Unett; 22 July 1936 Wolvey, Warwickshire, England
- Died: 21 January 2000 (aged 63) Rugby, Warwickshire, England

British Saloon Car Championship
- Years active: 1966–1967, 1971, 1974–1977
- Teams: Alan Fraser Racing; Jean Denton Racing; Halesford Motors Ltd. Chrysler Dealer Team
- Starts: 64
- Wins: 2 (32 in class)
- Poles: 0
- Fastest laps: 30
- Best finish: 1st in 1974, 1976, 1977

Championship titles
- 1974, 1976, 1977 1974, 1976, 1977: British Saloon Car Championship; BSCC - Class A

William Bernard Unett (22 July 1936 – 21 January 2000) was a British racing driver and development engineer, three times winner of the British Saloon Car Championship in 1974, 1976 and 1977.

Unett was born on 22 July 1936 in Wolvey, Warwickshire. His parents ran a farm and it was being around, then helping repair the farm machinery sparked his interest in mechanics. Instead of following his parents into farming, he joined Humber as an apprentice at the age of 15 which was part of the Rootes Group organisation. He became development engineer, one of a select few, known as 'The Set 'em Alight Boys' due to Rootes Chief Test engineer Don Tarbun's expression 'For fuck's sake, set 'em alight', often exclaimed by him when facing difficulties. Unett was deputy head of the department for the development of the 'series' Sunbeam Alpine in 1958–1959.

== Career ==
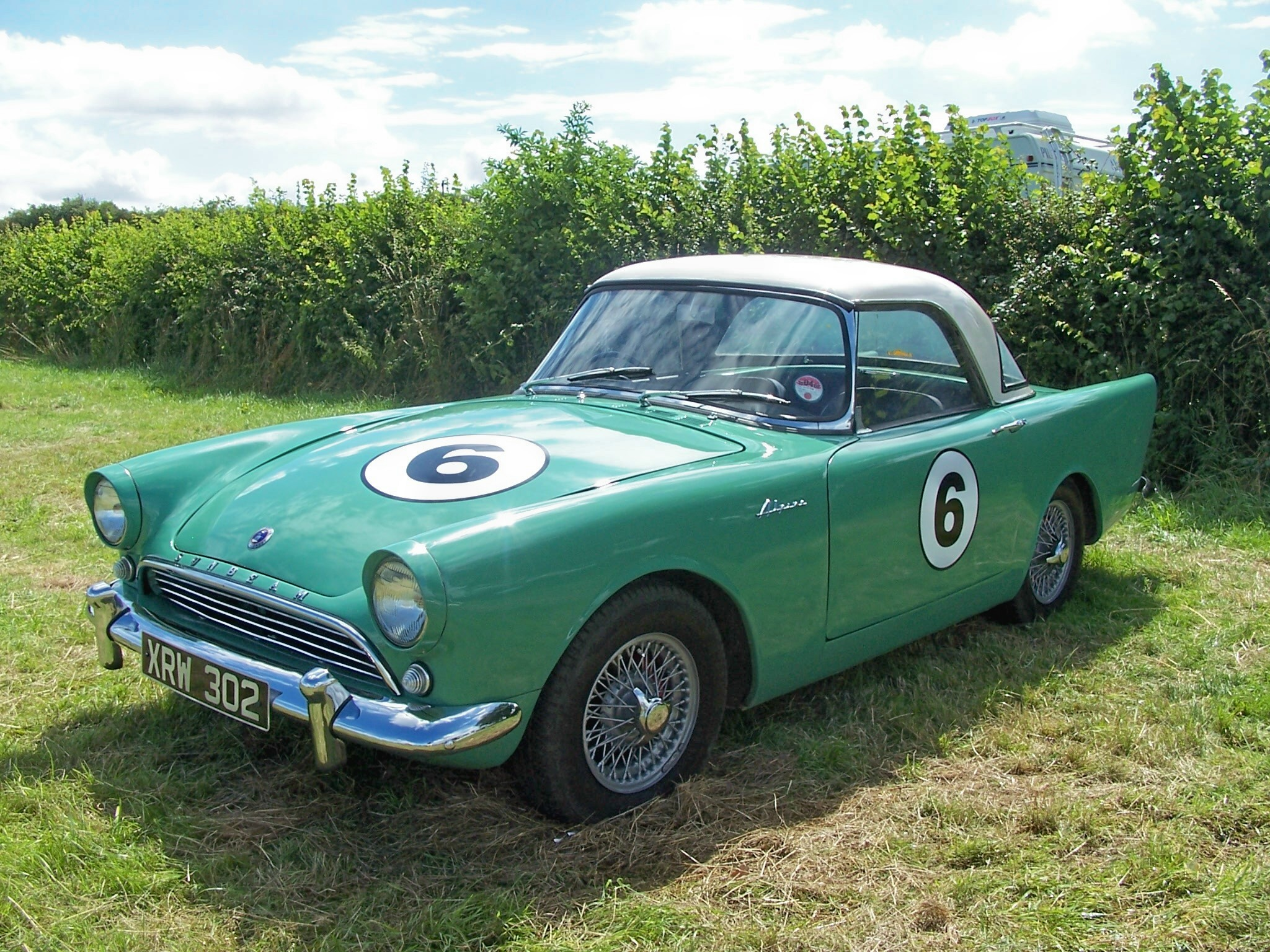
Unett's first racer XRW 302

Unett began motor racing in 1961. After competing and crashing in a disastrous Club rally, Rootes competition manager Mike Parkes encouraged Unett to attend a race meeting at the Goodwood Circuit, leading him to buy his first racing car, a prototype from the Alpine development programme registration number XRW 302. After developing it for racing it was in this car that Unett won his first trophy in 1964, the 'Freddie Dixon Challenge Trophy', one of the biggest prizes in motor club racing at the time. The history of this surviving prototype can be found here. The site also has a film and pictorial history of Unett's career.

By 1965, Unett was married with three children and helped out on his parents' farm when there was time for relaxation. He was now working at Rootes' new technical centre at Whitley where he worked on vehicle evaluation under Graham Robson. During his four years there he was closely involved with the birth of the Hillman Avenger, doing a lot of the road testing. Unett also began racing for the Alan Fraser racing team, who developed the Hillman Imp for racing from 1964 onwards, competing principally against the Mini Cooper S. The team were soon having great success in surprisingly standard Imps. Unett, in a 998 cc Imp, was soon showing a 1299 cc Mini Cooper S the way around the track at the motor show 200 meeting. (The Imp was much better on the corners.)

In 1966, Alan Fraser signed a three-year contract with Rootes to manage their British and overseas racing programme, with Rootes Competitions department manager Norman Garrad continuing to manage the Rally programme. Unett was soon setting lap records in the Imp at Brands Hatch. At the 1966 Easter meeting he set a lap record of 59.8, an Imp becoming the first car in its class to lap Brands in under a minute, and also won the Edward Lewis Trophy. By August, the team had won 16 first places, two seconds and seven class lap records. Unett had also won the Westover Saloon car Championship, a 'free formula' Saloon car series run at Brans Hatch, with 41 points. The Hillman Imp led in the British championship series.

Unett was also having great success racing a Sunbeam Tiger, registration number ADU 180B, in the 1965 season. It was one of the two ill-prepared Tigers that had an embarrassingly short outing at the Le Mans 24-hour race the year before. Unett, having modified the car, had little trouble beating the competition, receiving glowing press reports. In just over 20 races, he had eleven outright wins, nine-second-place finishes and never failed to get placed. He just fell short of winning the Autosport championship in the final race of the competition, due to a broken fan belt and a broken rear axle. Details of this surviving ex-Le Mans car can be found here.

For the 1966 season, Unett and Alan Fraser built what was to become known as the 'Monster Tiger'. Driven by Unett and other drivers, it was very competitive, winning many races outright. But Unett lost out on a major title, using his original Tiger as in the previous year, in the very last race of the Autosport 1966 championship. Unett also finished second overall in the Fred W Dixon Marque Trophy in the Monster Tiger. Continuing to race what were now highly developed Fraser Imps in 1967, Unett won the Grovewood 'Redex Gold Cross' championship. and came fifth overall in the 1967 British Saloon Car Championship season, battling it out with Ralph Broad's Broadspeed Anglias. In 1968, the take over of Rootes by Chrysler, tougher competition and changes in the rules severely limited the Fraser Imp team's activities and success. After venturing into Formula 5000 in 1969 and 1970, Fraser retired from racing, moving to Tenerife.

Unett went on to race in the single seat Imp powered Vixen cars that dominated the BP Formula 4 championship in 1968, the Vixens winning the first six places, With Unett winning the BP title. In 1969, Vixen decided to enter Formula 3. Unett already had a brief go at Formula 3 using a Lotus 31 in the 'Les Leston Championship' in 1967, and he started to develop a Holbay powered car for Vixen. However, Unett crashed the car at Silverstone on its first test and that's as far as the project got. Although walking away uninjured from quite a wreck, Unett then temporarily retired from competitive racing, becoming chief racing instructor at Mallory Park. Unett was a last-minute stand in for a three-man private entry for the 1970 London to Mexico World Cup Rally, using a Hillman Hunter. They got as far as Yugoslavia before crashing out in a collision with a wood truck.

To end his retirement in 1971, Unett planned a big comeback in Formula 5000. He was to buy a Lola Cars T 142 from racing driver Derek Williams. Williams rolled the car and was killed, ending the deal. His comeback finally came in 1972 with Unett as Rootes' chief Works driver also in charge of the re-financed Rootes competition workshop, with Des O'Dell as competition team manager. The department had 'closed' shortly after their big win with the Hillman Hunter in the London to Sydney Marathon in 1968, due to Rootes' mounting losses. O'Dell actually run it on a shoe-string budget relying on competition parts sales for finance until Works backing was reinstated in 1972.

Adopting the name Bernard 'Tiger' Unett (with a tiger script, then later, a tiger logo on his crash helmet) he was class winner in the 1972 'Britax' Saloon car championship in a MOPAR Hillman Avenger. Unett also had great success in a Hillman Hunter. A film made in 1972 called 'Some go quicker than others' (available on YouTube) featured Unett, Des O'Dell and the Chrysler Dealer team Hunters in a heat of the Castrol Production Saloon car series, in which Unett was competition winner in his class in 1973. Also in this year, Unett entered a Hillman Hunter in the Avon/Motor magazine 2000 mile Tour of Britain, with Brian Coyle as co-driver, and finished First in class, ninth overall.

Unett's biggest success came with the Hillman Avenger in the Rootes (later Chrysler) works Dealer Team managed by Des O'Dell, with which he won the 1974 British Saloon Car Championship season. Unett won the 1600cc class on eight occasions, with victories at Brands Hatch, Mallory Park, Snetterton, the Thruxton Circuit and Ingliston. Also in '74, he was first in class and 11th overall in the 'Access' RAC Tourist Trophy and with co-driver Geraint Phillips, Unett won his class, was 13th overall and took the manufactures team award in the Avon/Motor magazine 2000 mile Tour of Britain. In 1975 Bernard Unett was elected to the British racing drivers club, but the 1600cc Avenger was not competitive enough to get consistent results against the newly introduced Toyota Celica and finished up with only three class wins and out of the top three in the Saloon Car championship. However, in the Avon/Motor magazine Tour of Britain, Unett (with Co-driver Neil Wilson) came first in class, Third overall and his team won the 'Trade Team' award for Halesfield motors.

Unett sidestepped the Toyotas in the following two years by dropping a class racing a 1300 cc car. MOPAR, the parts and accessories firm sponsored the car, with Unett himself running the operation from his Wolvey home with mechanic Tony Bradshaw and Unett's wife Joan who managed the team. They went on to win the 1976 British Saloon Car Championship season and the 1977 British Saloon Car Championship season. in a 1300 cc Chrysler Avenger, Chrysler having taken over the ailing Rootes group. In the 1976 championship, Unett had a run-away victory, with ten class wins in ten races. In the 1977 championship Unett won his class nine times against increasingly tough opposition from the Mini of Richard Longman. Eventually results ended in a tie with Unett and Tony Dron having 52 points each. A protracted dispute followed due to loose wording in the rules for point awarded for fastest lap, but after some weeks, Unett was declared champion for the third time. To add to confusion that has lasted to this very day the new sponsor, Tricentrol, changed the name of the championship from 'Touring car' to 'Saloon car' championship in 1977.

Unett began to compete in rallies, and in 1977, he took part in the Galway International Rally using Hillman Avenger modified for group 1, finishing sixth overall and winning the team prize with Robin Eyre-Maunsell and Derek McMahon. He also entered the Manx rally (now called the Rally Isle of Man) in an Avenger with Paul White as co-driver, finishing in sixth place with 13021 points. In the same year, Unett was awarded the very first British Racing Drivers' Club 'Silver Star', one of the UK motor sports most prestigious awards. In 1978 Unett did the development testing for the Chrysler Sunbeam Lotus, which was renamed the Talbot Sunbeam Lotus when Chrysler sold the company to Peugeot. Unett and co–driver Terry Harryman took a works development 8-valve Brazilian Sunbeam (WRW 29S) to Galway to compete in the 1978 Galway International Rally, but crashed out in appallingly wet weather, with only a handful of cars reaching the finish line.

Unett became involved in world class competition when The Sunbeam Lotus took part in international rallying, going on to win the RAC Rally in 1980 in the hands of Henri Toivonen and the world rally championship (manufacturer) 1981, (teams again being managed by Des O'Dell) with Unett being development engineer, test driver and part of the roadside rally support team. Some of the Coventry development team (including Des O'Dell and Paul White) then moved to Paris to work on competition cars including the development of The Peugeot 205 turbo 16, the first purpose built four wheel drive rally car. Unett remained in Coventry and in 1981 worked on the development of the Talbot Samba for rallying, but this project was abandoned the following year, ending competition participation in Britain for several years. At the end of 1984, Peugeot Talbot announced a return to rallying in Britain through a dealer team, involving Bernard Unett in the task developing the Peugeot 205 Gti for rallying in group 'A'. Having been promised a Group 'B' car, in mid 1984 Unett took a squad of mechanics to Paris to work on the 205 turbo 16 set aside for the British rally dealer team. It was the car Bruno Saby had used on the Safari Rally so was in need of quite a re-build. The 205 Gti first competed in the 1985 'National Breakbown Rally', first leg of the 'RAC Open Championship', drivers being Louise Aitken-Walker and Mikael Sundstrom, but neither finished. Aitken-Walker managed a class win in the following Irish rally. Then, in time for the Scottish rally, the 205 turbo 16 was ready, where Sundstrom drove the car to victory. The 205 turbo 16 went on to win both the constructor and driver titles in the World Rally Championship in 1985 and 1986, drivers being Timo Salonen and Juha Kankkunen respectively, under the Paris-based team. Unett also co-ordinated the 'Sunbeam Ti Challenge' series, a competition for less experienced young rally drivers, using an uprated version of the road going 205 Ti model. Unett was forced into retirement in 1988 when a back injury he suffered in a shunt ended his direct involvement in motorsport. In 1995, Unett became a Life member of the British Racing Drivers Club.

Unett died of cancer in 2000.

== Racing record ==
=== Complete British Saloon Car Championship results ===
(key) (Races in bold indicate pole position; races in italics indicate fastest lap.)

Year	Team	Car	Class	1	2	3	4	5	6	7	8	9	10	11	12	13	14	15	Pos.	Pts	Class
1966	Alan Fraser Racing Team	Hillman Imp	A	SNE	GOO	SIL	CRY	BRH; 15	BRH; 18	OUL; Ret†	BRH ?								19th	12	5th
1967	Alan Fraser Racing Team	Hillman Imp	A	BRH ?	SNE ?	SIL ?	SIL; 10	MAL ?†	SIL ?	SIL ?	BRH; 9	OUL; 5†	BRH; 9						4th	54	**2nd**
1971	Jean Denton Racing	Sunbeam Imp	A	BRH	OUL; 6	THR; 11	SIL	CRY	SIL	CRO	SIL	OUL	BRH	MAL	BRH				20th	15	5th
1974	Chrysler Dealer Team	Hillman Avenger 1500 GT	A	MAL; 4†	BRH; Ret														**1st**	**69**	**1st**
1974	Chrysler Dealer Team	Hillman Avenger 1600 GT	A			SIL ?	OUL ?	THR ?	SIL ?	THR; 10	BRH; 14	ING; 7†	BRH; 8†	OUL ?	SNE ?	BRH; Ret			**1st**	**69**	**1st**
1975	Halesford Motors Ltd.	Hillman Avenger 1600 GT	A	MAL; 4†	BRH; Ret	OUL; 4†	THR; 13	SIL ?	BRH; 7†	THR ?	SIL ?†	MAL; 3†	SNE ?	SIL ?	ING	BRH	OUL	BRH	6th	63	**2nd**
1976	Mopar	Hillman Avenger 1300 GT	A	BRH ?	SIL; 16	OUL; 1†	THR; 15	THR ?	SIL ?	BRH; 11									**1st**	**90**	**1st**
1976	Mopar	Chrysler Avenger 1300 GT	A								MAL; 4†	SNE; 3†	BRH ?						**1st**	**90**	**1st**
1977	Mopar	Chrysler Avenger 1300 GT	A	SIL; Ret	BRH ?	OUL; 1†	THR ?	SIL ?	THR ?	DON; 2†	SIL; 13	DON; 2†	BRH ?	THR ?	BRH; 12				**1st**	**52**	**1st**

† Events with 2 races staged for the different classes.

Sporting positions
Preceded by Frank Gardner	British Touring Car Champion; 1974	Succeeded by Andy Rouse
Preceded by Andy Rouse	British Touring Car Champion; 1976–1977	Succeeded by Richard Longman
