= Richard Lloyd (racing driver) =

British racing driver (1945–2008)

- Nationality: (United Kingdom) British
- Born: Richard Hugh Lloyd; 18 February 1945
- Died: 30 March 2008 (aged 63); Farnborough, London, England

24 Hours of Le Mans career
- Years: 1982–1985
- Teams: GTi Engineering, Richard Lloyd Racing
- Best finish: 2nd (1985)
- Class wins: 0

Richard Hugh Lloyd (18 February 1945 – 30 March 2008) was a British racing car driver and founder of multiple sports car and touring car teams. He drove in multiple championships himself, including the British Saloon Car Championship and the World Endurance Championship.

== Life and career ==
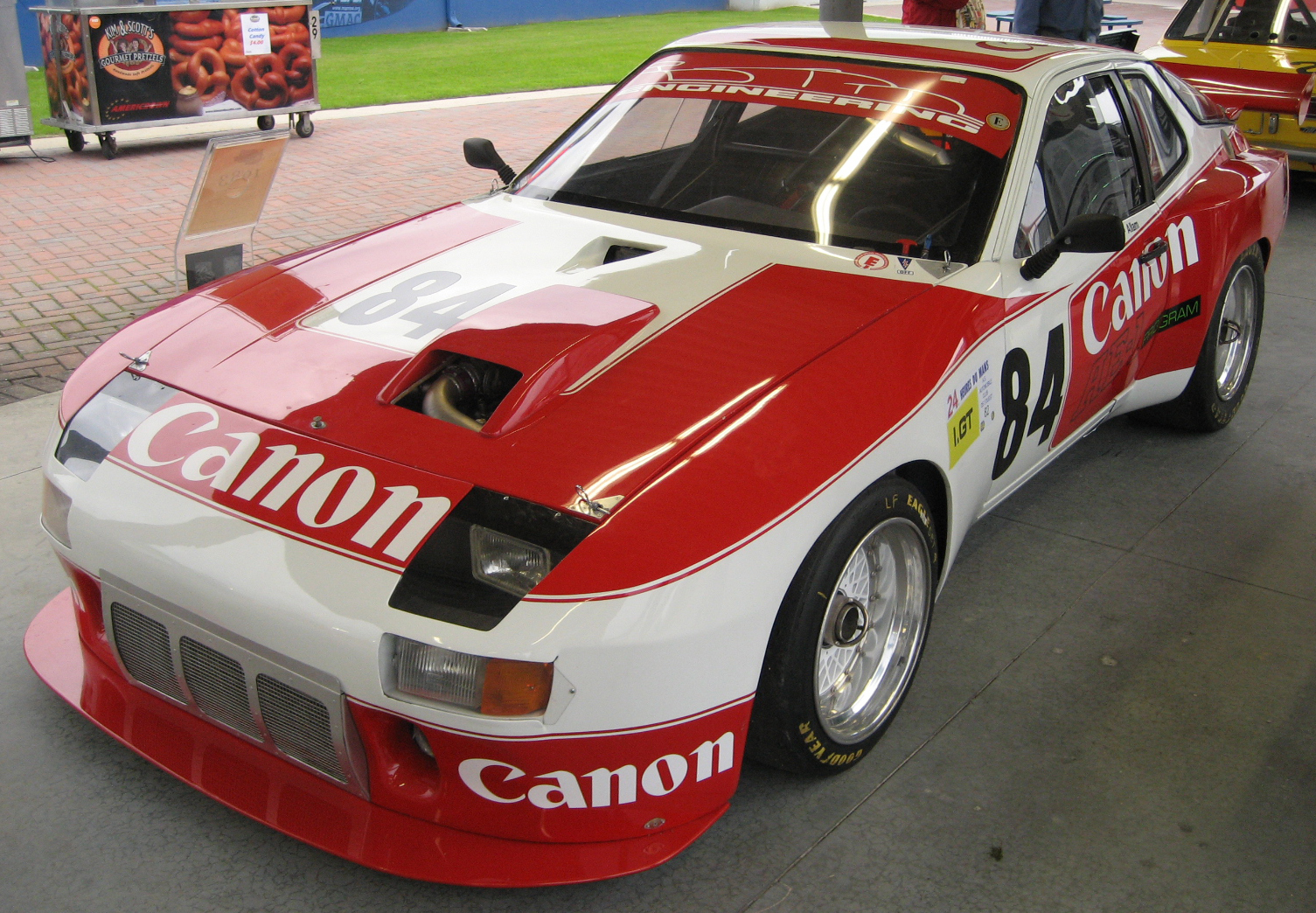
A Porsche 924 Carrera GTR which Lloyd co-drove with Andy Rouse and Jeff Allam.

Initially, Lloyd worked for Decca Records from 1964 to 1970, during which time he became interested in racing after competing in a Triumph TR4A during 1967. He later formed his own public relations business, Motor Race Relations, in 1971, while continuing his own driving duties, during which time he won multiple events in the British Saloon Car Championship. He went on to form GTi Engineering in 1978, running Volkswagen Golf GTIs and Audi 80s. This team eventually became Richard Lloyd Racing in 1985 as Lloyd moved into the World Sportscar Championship with Porsche 956s and 962s.

Following the demise of the team in 1990, Lloyd returned to racing, driving, and winning, in the Porsche 924 Championship. In 1995, he established Audi Sport UK to once again compete in the British Touring Car Championship, with support from the Audi factory. Lloyd re-entered sports car racing in 1999 with the Audi R8C program at the 24 Hours of Le Mans, before being chosen by Audi's fellow Volkswagen Group subsidiary, Bentley, to run the EXP Speed 8 program in 2001.

Audi Sport UK was renamed Apex Motorsport during their Bentley tenure, subsequently became Jaguar's development team for the XKR in the FIA GT3 European Championship. Lloyd stopped racing professionally in the 1990s, but continued to run in historic racing events up until his death.

== Death ==
Lloyd died on 30 March 2008, when a private jet on which he was travelling crashed into a house in Farnborough, London, shortly after take-off from Biggin Hill Airport. All five occupants died upon impact; among them were an Apex Motorsport Data Engineer, Christopher Allarton, and former British Touring Car Championship driver David Leslie. Both were en route with Lloyd to the Nogaro Circuit in France to prepare Apex Motorsport's Jaguar for the upcoming FIA GT3 season.

The investigation into the crash found that a combination of incorrectly identified, non-critical system failures led to the in-flight shut-down of both engines, with the crew unable to restart them in time to avoid the impact.

== Racing record ==
=== Complete British Saloon Car Championship results ===
(key) (Races in bold indicate pole position; races in italics indicate fastest lap.)

Year	Team	Car	Class	1	2	3	4	5	6	7	8	9	10	11	12	13	14	15	Pos.	Pts	Class
1973	A.J. Rivers Simoniz Racing	Chevrolet Camaro Z28	D	BRH	SIL	THR	THR	SIL	ING	BRH	SIL	BRH; Ret							NC	0	NC
1974	A.J. Rivers Simoniz Racing	Chevrolet Camaro Z28	D	MAL; 2†	**BRH**; Ret	SIL; 2	OUL; 2	THR; 1	SIL; Ret	THR; 1	**BRH**; 2	**ING**; 4†	BRH; 1†	OUL; 2	**SNE**; Ret†	BRH; Ret			8th	47	**2nd**
1975	Think Automotive / Simoniz Racing	Chevrolet Camaro Z28	D	MAL; 1†	BRH; 4	OUL; 2	THR; 1	**SIL**; 1	**BRH**; 1†	THR; 2	**SIL**; 2	MAL; 2†	SNE; 5	SIL; 12	ING	BRH; 2†	OUL; Ret	BRH; 2	4th	65	**2nd**
1976	Ottershaw Motors	Opel Commodore GS/E	D	BRH	SIL; Ret	OUL; Ret†	THR; Ret	THR; 5	SIL ?	BRH; 18	MAL; 5†	SNE; Ret†	BRH						23rd	9	7th
1977	Richard Lloyd Racing	Volkswagen Golf GTI	B	SIL ?	BRH; DNS	OUL; 2†	THR ?	SIL ?	THR ?	DON; 7†	SIL; 12	DON; 3†	BRH ?	THR ?	BRH; 8				**3rd**	**40**	**1st**
1978	Richard Lloyd Racing	Volkswagen Golf GTI	B	SIL; 8	**OUL**; 1†	THR ?	**BRH**; 1†	**SIL**; 1†	**DON**; 1†	**MAL**; 1†	BRH; 11	**DON**; DSQ†	BRH; DNS	THR ?	**OUL**; 1†				**2nd**	**90**	**1st**
1979	The Akai Golf	Volkswagen Golf GTI	B	SIL; 11	**OUL**; DSQ†	THR; 11	SIL; 15	DON ?	SIL ?	MAL; 2†	DON; 10	BRH ?	THR ?	SNE; 11	OUL; 1†				**3rd**	**82**	**1st**
1980	GTI Engineering	Audi 80 GLE	B	MAL; Ret†	OUL; 3†	THR; 10	SIL; 10	SIL; 10	BRH ?	**MAL** ?†	BRH; DSQ	THR; 9	SIL; 15						8th	41	**3rd**
1983	GTI Engineering	Volkswagen Golf GTI	C	SIL	OUL	THR	BRH	THR	SIL	DON	SIL	DON	BRH	SIL; 13					25th	3	12th

† Events with 2 races staged for the different classes.

=== 24 Hours of Le Mans results ===
Year	Team	Co-drivers	Car	Class	Laps	Pos.	Class pos.
1982	(United Kingdom) Canon Cameras (United Kingdom) GTi Engineering	(United Kingdom) Andy Rouse	Porsche 924 Carrera GTR	IMSA; GTO	77	DNF	DNF
1983	(United Kingdom) Canon Racing (United Kingdom) GTi Engineering	(Netherlands) Jan Lammers (United Kingdom) Jonathan Palmer	Porsche 956	C	339	8th	8th
1984	(United Kingdom) GTi Engineering	(United Kingdom) Nick Mason (France) René Metge	Porsche 956	C1	139	DSQ	DSQ
1985	(United Kingdom) Richard Lloyd Racing	(United Kingdom) Jonathan Palmer (United Kingdom) James Weaver	Porsche 956 GTi	C1	371	**2nd**	**2nd**
