= Vince Woodman =

British racing driver (1937–2021)

- Nationality: (United Kingdom) British
- Born: 6 August 1937 Bristol, England
- Died: 2 June 2021 (aged 83)

British Saloon / Touring Car Championship
- Years active: 1966–1967, 1969–1982, 1984, 1989–1990
- Teams: VMW Motors; BMW (GB) Ltd; Vauxhall Motorsport; Graham Hathaway Racing
- Starts: 172
- Wins: 12 (10 in class)
- Poles: 11
- Fastest laps: 22
- Best finish: 3rd in 1973

Vincent Michael Woodman (6 August 1937 – 2 June 2021) was a British racing driver. He started racing in 1965 and competed mainly in touring cars, mostly with cars from the Ford marque. In 1973, he finished third overall in the British Saloon Car Championship, driving a 1300cc Ford Escort. He finished fifth in the BSCC in 1982, winning four races outright, the last wins for a Ford Capri. Woodman died on 2 June 2021.

== Racing record ==
=== Complete British Saloon / Touring Car Championship results ===
(key) (Races in bold indicate pole position; races in italics indicate fastest lap.)

Year	Team	Car	Class	1	2	3	4	5	6	7	8	9	10	11	12	13	14	15	Pos.	Pts	Class
1966	VMW Motors	Ford Cortina Lotus	C	SNE	GOO	SIL	CRY	BRH	BRH	OUL	BRH; 12^								30th	4	9th
1967	VMW Motors	Ford Cortina Lotus	C	BRH; Ret^	SNE	SIL	SIL	MAL; Ret†	SIL	SIL	BRH	OUL	BRH; 17						30th	4	10th
1969	VMW Motors	Ford Escort 1300 GT	B	BRH; 22^	SIL; 14	SNE; 10	THR	SIL	CRY	MAL	CRO	SIL	OUL; Ret	BRH; 9^	BRH; Ret				21st	10	6th
1970	VMW Motors	Ford Escort 1.0	A	BRH; Ret^	SNE; 17	THR; 18	SIL; 18	CRY; 5†	SIL; 25	SIL; 21^	CRO; Ret^	BRH							7th	44	4th
1970	VMW Motors	Ford Escort 1300 GT	B										OUL; 11	BRH; 14^	BRH; 8				7th	44	9th
1971	VMW Motors	Ford Escort 1300 GT	B	BRH; 7^	OUL; Ret	THR; 7	SIL; 11	CRY; 1†	SIL; 11	CRO; Ret	SIL; Ret	OUL; 9	BRH; 6	MAL; 4†	BRH; 8				5th	59	**2nd**
1972	VMW Motors	Ford Escort 1300 GT	B	BRH; 5	OUL; Ret	THR; 6	SIL; Ret	**CRY**; 3†	BRH; Ret	OUL; Ret	SIL ?^	MAL; Ret†	BRH; Ret						13th	22	**3rd**
1973	Team Esso Uniflo	Ford Escort 1300 BDA	B	BRH; 7	SIL; 7	THR; Ret	THR; 6	SIL; 4	ING; Ret^	BRH; 5†	SIL; Ret^								**3rd**	**51**	**2nd**
1973	Team Esso Uniflo	Ford Escort RS1600	C									BRH; 9							**3rd**	**51**	NC
1974	Team Esso Uniflo	Chevrolet Camaro Z28	D	MAL; 3†	BRH; 4	SIL; 3	**OUL**; 3	THR	SIL; 1	THR; Ret	BRH; DNS	ING; 5†	BRH; 2†	**OUL**; 3	SNE ?	**BRH**; 2			10th	39	**3rd**
1975	Team Esso Uniflo	Chevrolet Camaro Z28	D	MAL; 5†	BRH; 2	OUL; Ret	THR; 7	SIL; 3	BRH; 2†	THR; 3	SIL; 4	MAL ?†	SNE; 2	SIL; 2	ING; 1†	BRH; 1†	OUL; 1	BRH; 3	5th	64	**3rd**
1976	Team Esso Uniflo	Ford Capri II 3.0s	D	BRH ?	SIL; 9	OUL; DNS	THR; 6	THR	SIL; Ret	BRH; 1	MAL; 4†	SNE; 5†	BRH; 7						14th	24	5th
1977	Team Esso Uniflo	Ford Capri II 3.0s	D	SIL; Ret	BRH ?	OUL; 6†	THR; 1	SIL; 2	THR; 6	DON; 7†	SIL; 5	DON; Ret†	BRH; 3	THR; 4	BRH; 3				11th	18	4th
1978	Equipe Esso	Ford Capri III 3.0s	D	SIL; 6	OUL; 7†	THR; 2	BRH; Ret†	SIL; Ret†	DON; 4†	MAL; Ret†	BRH; 5	DON; 3†	BRH; 6	THR; 5	OUL; 5†				13th	24	4th
1979	Equipe Esso	Ford Capri III 3.0s	D	SIL; 5	OUL; 4†	THR; 2	SIL; 6	DON; 4	SIL; DSQ	**MAL**; 5†	DON; 2	BRH ?	THR	SNE; 2	OUL				13th	37	4th
1980	Equipe Esso	Ford Capri III 3.0s	D	MAL; 3†	OUL; 3†	THR; 2	SIL; 3	SIL; 4	BRH; 3	MAL; 4†	BRH; 4	**THR**; Ret	SIL; 3						9th	36	**3rd**
1981	Equipe Esso	Ford Capri III 3.0s	D	MAL; 3†	SIL; 3	OUL; 4†	THR; 1	BRH; 7†	SIL; 5	SIL; 26	DON; Ret†	BRH; Ret	**THR**; 4	SIL; 4					11th	35	5th
1982	Equipe Esso	Ford Capri III 3.0s	D	SIL; 3	MAL; 2†	**OUL**; 6†	THR; 1	**THR**; 1	SIL; 2	DON; 1	**BRH**; 4	**DON**; Ret	BRH; 1	SIL; 7					5th	60	**2nd**
1984	BMW (GB) Ltd	BMW 635CSi	A	DON; DNS	SIL	OUL; 5	THR; 6	THR; 7	SIL	SNE	BRH; 4	BRH; 5	DON; 6	SIL; 6					18th	10	9th
1989	Vauxhall Motorsport	Vauxhall Astra GTE 16v	C	OUL	SIL	THR	DON; 12‡	THR	SIL	SIL	BRH	SNE	BRH	BIR	DON	SIL			35th	6	9th
1990	Graham Hathaway Racing	Ford Sierra RS500	A	OUL	DON	THR	SIL	OUL	SIL	BRH; Ret‡	SNE	BRH	BIR	DON	THR	SIL			NC	0	NC

† Events with 2 races staged for the different classes.

‡ Endurance driver.

^ Race with 2 heats - Aggregate result.
