= Richard Lloyd Racing =

British auto racing team

(United Kingdom) Richard Lloyd Racing
- Founded: 1977
- Folded: 1990
- Team principal(s): Richard Lloyd; Keith Greene
- Former series: British Saloon Car Championship; World Sportscar Championship

Richard Lloyd Racing (RLR), originally named GTi Engineering, was a British auto racing team created in 1977 by driver Richard Lloyd. Originally named for the Volkswagen Golf GTIs that Lloyd raced in the British Saloon Car Championship (BSCC), they went on to become a successful Porsche privateer in the World Sportscar Championship (WSC). Richard Lloyd Racing eventually folded at the end of the 1990 season due to the increased cost of the World Championship.

The team was also known for their extensively modified Porsche 956s and 962Cs, developed to overcome some problems in the original Porsche design and construction. The cars, all named GTi after the team, were able to outperform their standard counterparts. The GTis made some of the first uses of exotic materials and innovative design elements that would later be adopted by Porsche and other manufacturers.

Even after the racing team had moved on to running Porsches, GTi Engineering remained a division of Richard Lloyd Racing and continued to offer car tuning for Volkswagen and Audi products. Parts and full conversions were constructed in their shared race shop at Silverstone Circuit. The tuning company was eventually sold off, but it remains in existence today.

== Racing history ==
=== 1977 – 1980 ===
GTi Engineering was created by Richard Lloyd in 1977 as his personal team in the British Saloon Car Championship, in which he had been competing for several years. The team was the primary entrant of the new GTi version of the Volkswagen Golf, which had been launched in 1976, and primary backing came from Volkswagen Great Britain. Lloyd not only managed the team, but also continued to drive. He earned a best result in the BSCC in 1978 when he finished second in the championship, and he earned several wins over the three-year period of the GTi program.

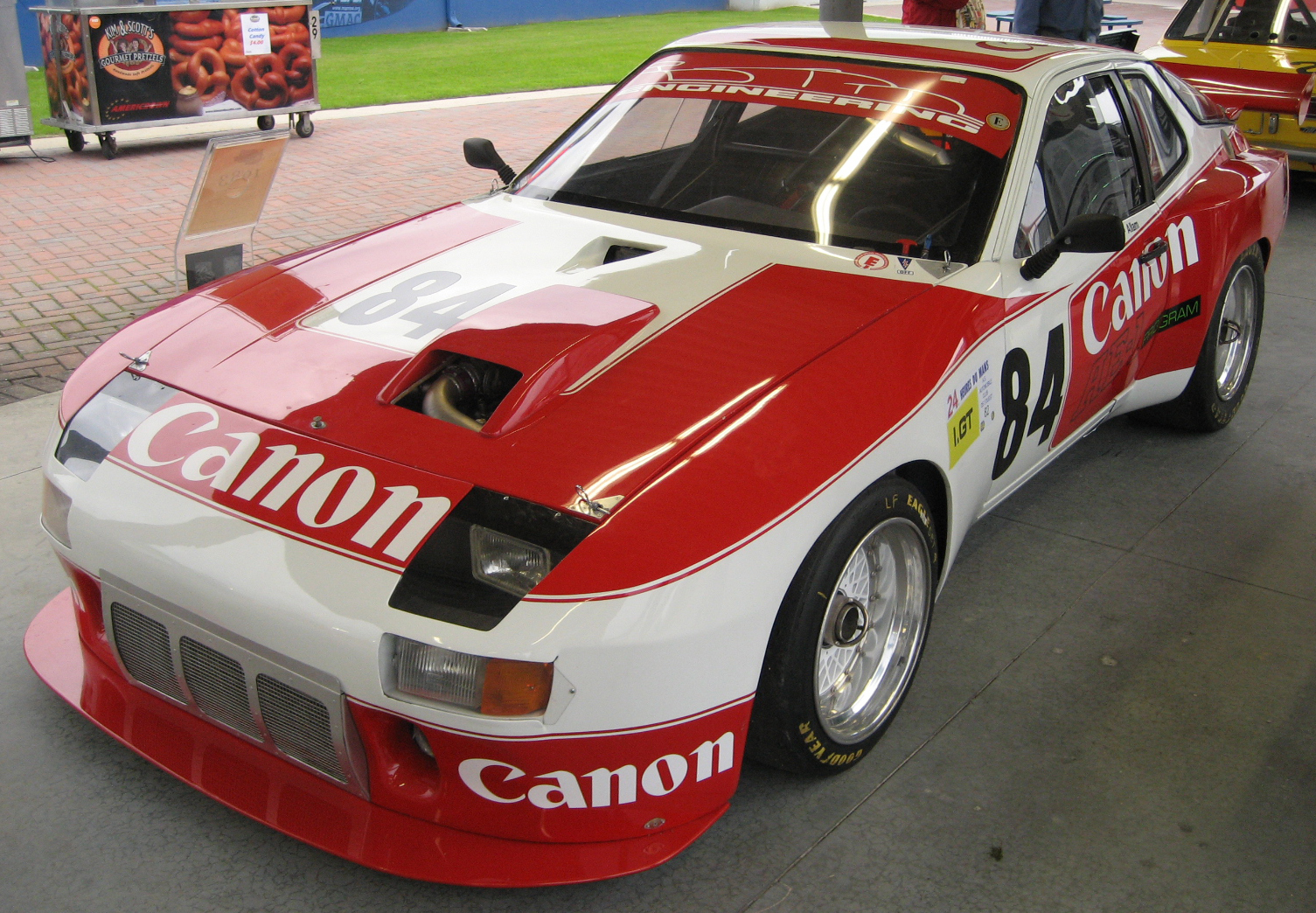
A Porsche 924 Carrera GTR campaigned by GTi Engineering. Canon entered motorsports by sponsoring this car.

In 1980, GTi Engineering moved from Volkswagen to partner brand Audi, entering the new Audi 80 in the BSCC. Lloyd was able to sign British drivers Stirling Moss and Martin Brundle to the team for that season. Following the 1980 campaign, GTi Engineering was approached by Porsche about becoming the primary European entrant of the company's new 924 Carrera GTR in endurance racing. To help with the project, GTi Engineering was able to sign Japanese camera firm Canon as the primary sponsor, leading to the team being known as Canon Racing.

=== 1981 – 1982 ===
The team made their international debut at the 1981 1000 km Monza, where drivers Richard Lloyd and Tony Dron finished in eighth place and second in their class. Victory quickly followed as Lloyd and driver Andy Rouse won their class in their home event, the 1000 km Brands Hatch.

For 1982, the team's 924 Carrera GTRs were adapted to comply with the International Motor Sports Association's GTO class regulations. Although this made the car ineligible for class victories in most European events, it was still able to compete with cars of similar classes. The team struggled for results that year, but a best result of fifth overall was achieved at the 1000 km Nürburgring. The team outlasted several Group C and Group 6 sports prototypes to finish high in the results.

=== 1983 – 1985 ===
Following the 1982 season, Porsche ended their 924 Carrera GTR development program and the team moved on to Porsche's newest motorsport offering, the Group C 956. This promoted GTi Engineering to the top class in the World Championship, which allowed them to compete for overall wins. In the team's second race with the 956, their home event at Silverstone, Jan Lammers and Thierry Boutsen secured a podium finish, which was followed by another at the Nürburgring. A final appearance on the podium was earned in the final European race of the year at Mugello Circuit. Lammers finished seventh in the Drivers Championship.

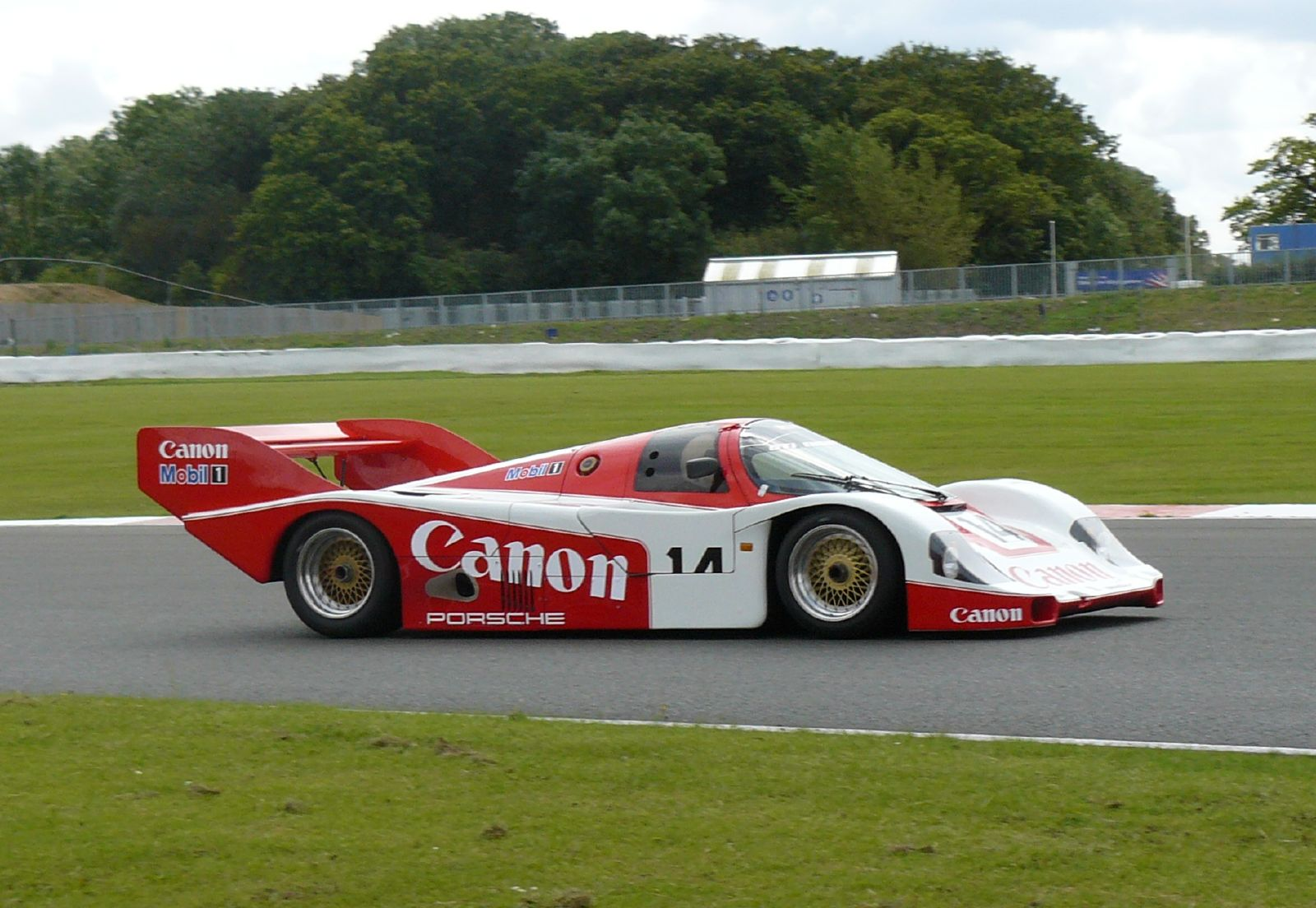
The Canon Racing Porsche 956 GTi, which the team used until 1986

For 1984, GTi continued their success in the World Championship. As part of an agreement with sponsor Canon, GTi Engineering entered a second car in select rounds of the championship for the purpose of carrying an on-board video camera within the cockpit to record the entire event. Although the added weight of the camera systems hampered the performance of the 956, the car was still driven as normal by Richard Lloyd and teammate, Pink Floyd drummer Nick Mason, and it made its debut at the 24 Hours of Le Mans. GTi's main 956 entry, however, remained a front runner in the hands of Lammers and John Fitzpatrick. Jonathan Palmer substituted for Fitzpatrick and, along with Lammers, took the team's first World Championship victory at Brands Hatch, two laps ahead of a Joest Racing Porsche. Soon after the victory, the team debuted its new car, the custom-built 956 GTi. The GTi was quickly able to usurp its predecessor, taking second at Imola. The team ended the year with Lammers and Fitzpatrick tied for fifth in the Drivers Championship.

During 1985, the team officially changed its title to Richard Lloyd Racing, although the GTi Engineering name was retained as part of the company. The team continued on with their 956s, even though some competitors were now using the improved 962C. The season began with Lammers and Palmer earning good results, and the team managed to earn a second-place finish at the 24 Hours of Le Mans with Jonathan Palmer, James Weaver, and Lloyd himself completing the race only three laps behind the winning Joest Porsche but ahead of the factory Rothmans Porsche. Trouble occurred during practice for the 1000 km Spa when a tyre let go, sending the car into the barrier at 140 mph (230 km/h), injuring Palmer and badly damaging the car, forcing it to undergo a lengthy rebuild. The team returned to the championship at Fuji but was unable to finish the event. Richard Lloyd Racing ended the year fifth in the Teams Championship, although Palmer was only twelfth in the Drivers Championship.

=== 1986 – 1990 ===
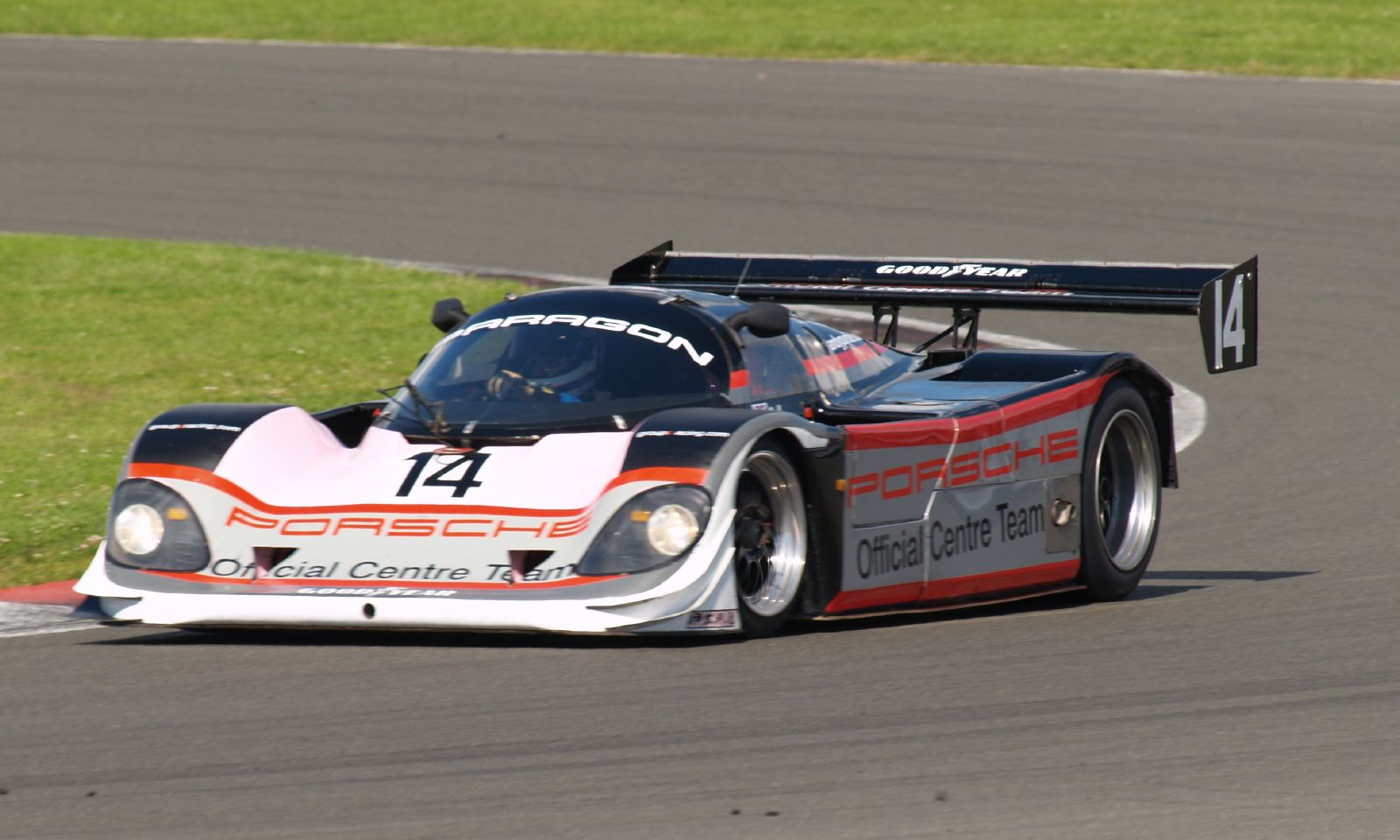
A 962C GTi as run by Richard Lloyd Racing in 1989

Canon chose to end their sponsorship of Richard Lloyd Racing in 1986, leaving the team to sign Liqui Moly as a replacement. The team pressed on with the 956 GTi, using a variety of rotating drivers without much success early in the season. Their results improved, however, as Brands Hatch once again saw success for the squad when they earned their second World Championship victory by four laps over Joest Racing, with factory Porsche drivers Mauro Baldi and Bob Wollek in the car. A second-place finish at the Nürburgring was the only other podium showing of the year, and the team finished the season sixth in the Teams Championship. Outside of the World Championship, the 956 GTi also made an appearance at an Interserie event at Richard Lloyd Racing's home track of Thruxton, winning one heat and finishing second overall in the combined results.

Richard Lloyd Racing replaced their aging 956 GTi prior to the 1987 season. A new 962C-based car was obtained, although it was once again built to a unique GTi specification. Jonathan Palmer and Mauro Baldi became full-season drivers for the squad. The team repeated their lack of early success from the previous year, once again earning a victory in the second half of the season. However, unlike the previous Brands Hatch successes, this one was earned at the Norisring sprint event. Brands Hatch remained lucky for the team though, as they earned a second place that year. Richard Lloyd Racing closed off the season with a third at Fuji, earning them fifth in the Teams Championship and helping Baldi tie for eighth in the Drivers Championship. The team also won the post-season exhibition event at Kyalami, South Africa, with Jochen Mass driving.

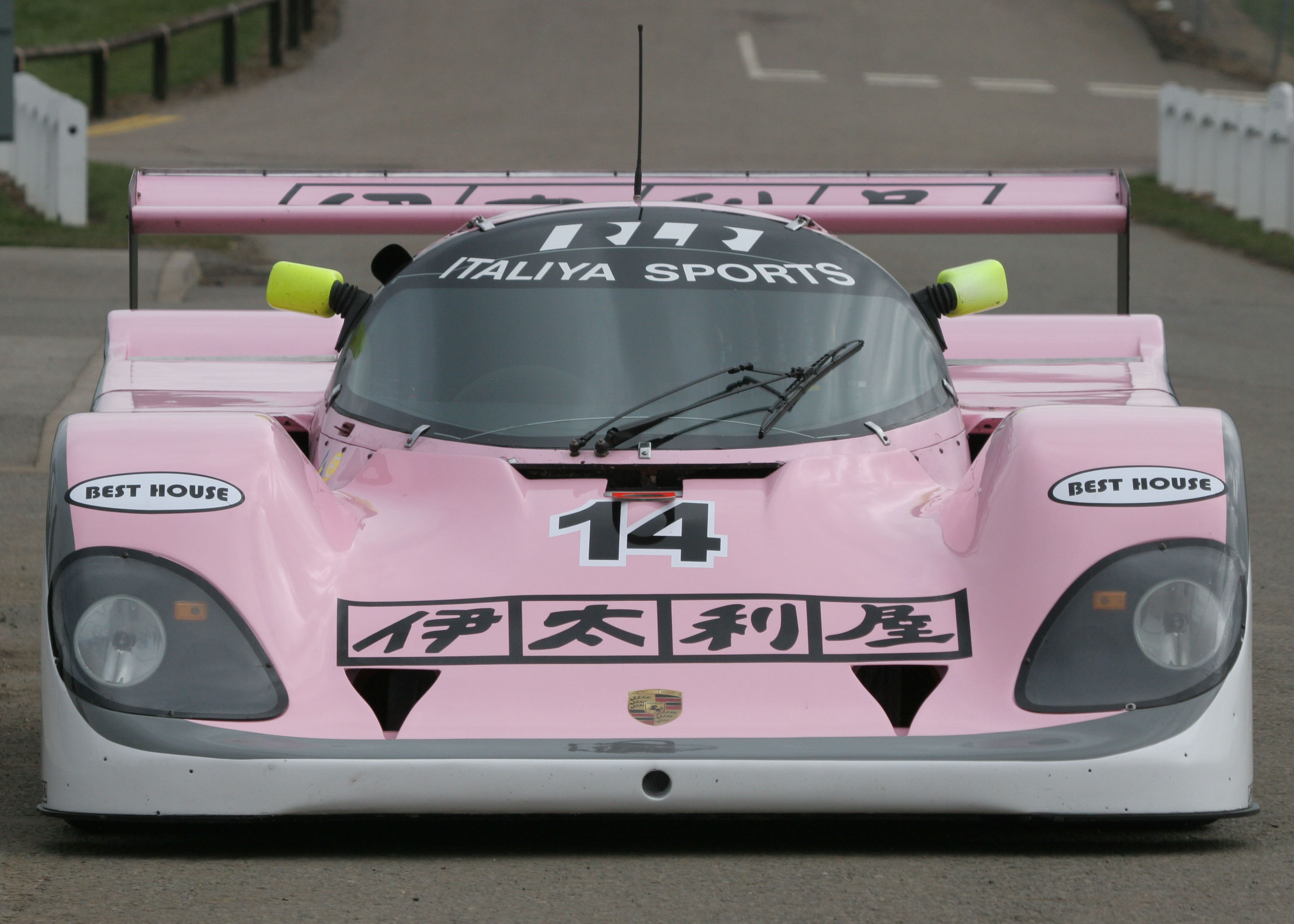
A Porsche 962C GTi in the team's 1990 color scheme, sponsored by Italiya.

A limited schedule of races were run in 1988, as Liqui Moly ended their sponsoring of the team. New backing instead came from Porsche Great Britain. A fourth-place finish at the opening sprint event was followed by a string of accidents and disqualifications, leading to the team missing several races for repairs. A seventh-place finish at the Nürburgring was the only other finish to earn points for the team, leaving them ninth in the Teams Championship as they ended their season early. Rather than participate in the Fuji event, the team went to North America for an exhibition event in Tampa, Florida, participating against Camel GT Championship teams. American driver Price Cobb joined James Weaver, and the duo earned third place behind the American Electramotive Nissan and the European Brun Porsche.

An evolution of the World Championship in 1989, with a schedule consisting entirely of shorter sprint events, helped reduce the cost for the teams and allowed Richard Lloyd Racing to restructure and add a second car to their line-up. Drivers included Derek Bell, Tiff Needell, and Steven Andskär. A fifth-place finish at Dijon-Prenois and fourth-place finish in the finale at Autódromo Hermanos Rodríguez were once again the only points earned by Richard Lloyd Racing, leaving them ninth in the Teams Championship. A home success outside the World Championship was achieved when Needell took second in a Supercup event at Silverstone.

For 1990, Richard Lloyd Racing signed Japanese firm Italiya as the primary sponsor for the team. The team was reduced to a single entry, primarily driven by Manuel Reuter, James Weaver, and Steven Andskär. A sixth place at Spa and third at a shortened Montreal event were the highlights of the year, and Richard Lloyd Racing was once again ninth in the championship with three points. The team also ran a standard 962C at Le Mans for Nick Mason. The Mason-owned car finished eleventh while the team's 962C GTi withdrew after a pit fire. After the season ended, Richard Lloyd Racing was closed due to a lack of funding necessary to continue on into 1991.

== GTi Porsches ==
=== 956 GTi ===
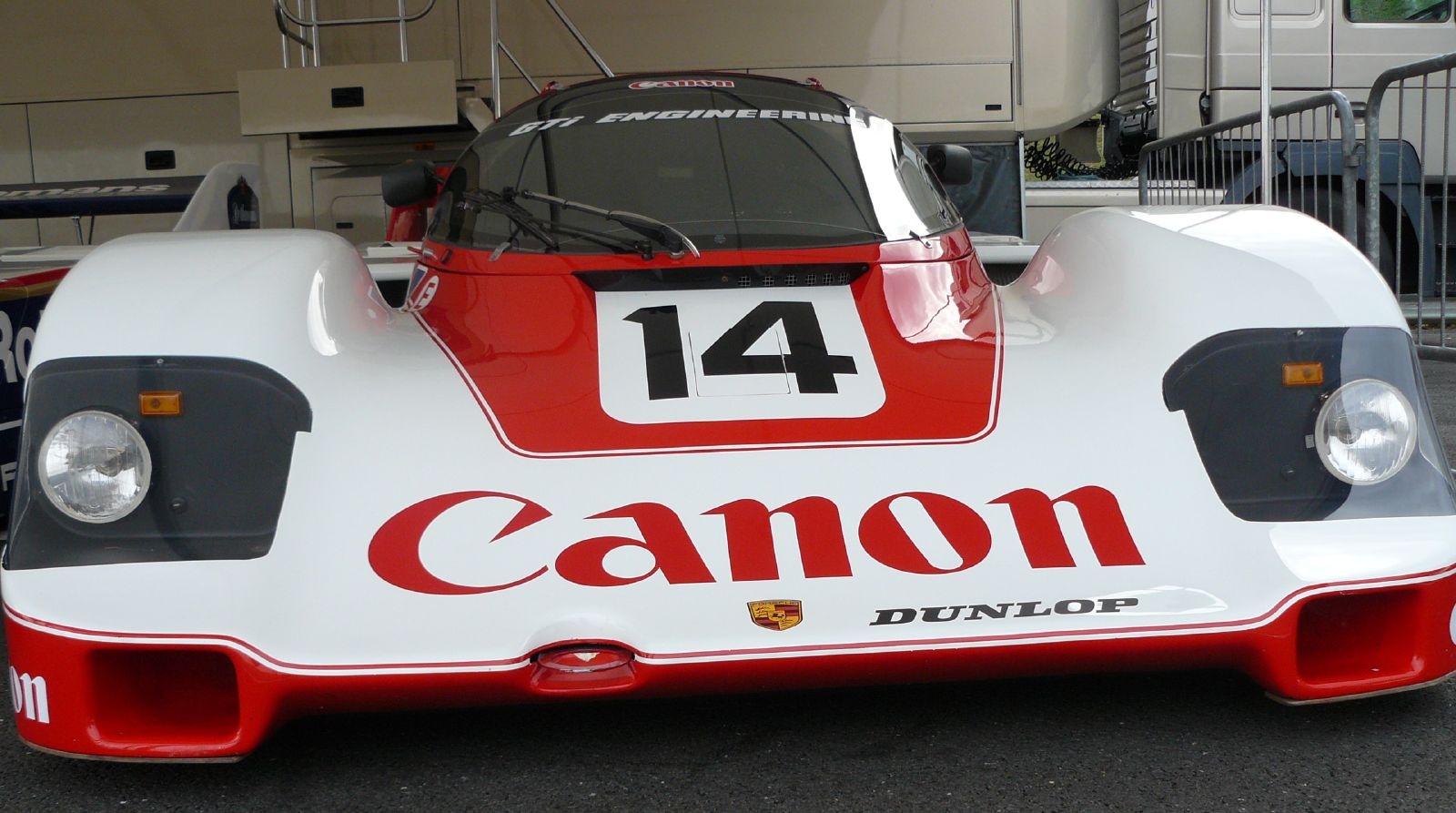
GTi Engineering's 956 GTi chassis #106BII following restoration

Following a successful debut season with the 956 in 1983, Richard Lloyd commissioned designer Nigel Stroud to develop a replacement monocoque and base chassis for the team's car in an attempt to increase structural rigidity over that of the factory Porsche unit. Aluminium composite honeycomb was used in place of aluminium sheet metal in constructing the new monocoque. This car, originally 956 chassis #106, was replaced by the Stroud-designed chassis designated #106B, leading to the car being renamed a 956 GTi.

Further modifications were made to the car once the monocoque had been completed, which included replacing the entire Porsche front suspension setup with a custom pullrod design. Bodywork modifications were also carried out by automotive designer Peter Stevens in an attempt to increase the overall downforce of the car on smaller circuits; a narrow wing devised by Lloyd and team manager Greene at the 1984 1000 km of Brands Hatch was placed on two vertical struts, attached to the nose of the car between the headlights and fenders. In addition, the standard rear wing was replaced with a twin element design at different angles of attack, with a narrow gap between the two. The wings were also constructed from carbon fibre, lighter than the standard aluminium used on 956s.

The #106B GTi chassis was badly damaged in an accident at the 1000 km Spa in 1985, requiring the team to build another monocoque known as #106BII. This chassis also adapted several newer 962 elements, including moving the cockpit farther back from the front axle. This chassis served with the team until the end of 1986, when it was replaced by the new 962C GTi. Following its retirement, 956 GTi was refurbished in 1990 and is now used in historic motorsport events. The car's initial Canon paint scheme is used once again.

=== 962C GTi ===
In an attempt to catch the improving capabilities of the factory 962Cs, Lloyd commissioned the construction of a new car for the 1987 season. As before, the monocoque was designed by Nigel Stroud, while standard 962 parts were adapted to fit alongside custom-built pieces. The first chassis, intentionally retaining the identification #106B but not the same chassis as used on the 956 GTi, once again featured noticeable differences from its factory brethren. The rear body of the car was completely redesigned, with the rear wing no longer part of the long tail bodywork. Instead, the wing hung off the rear of the car, attached only by struts at the center.

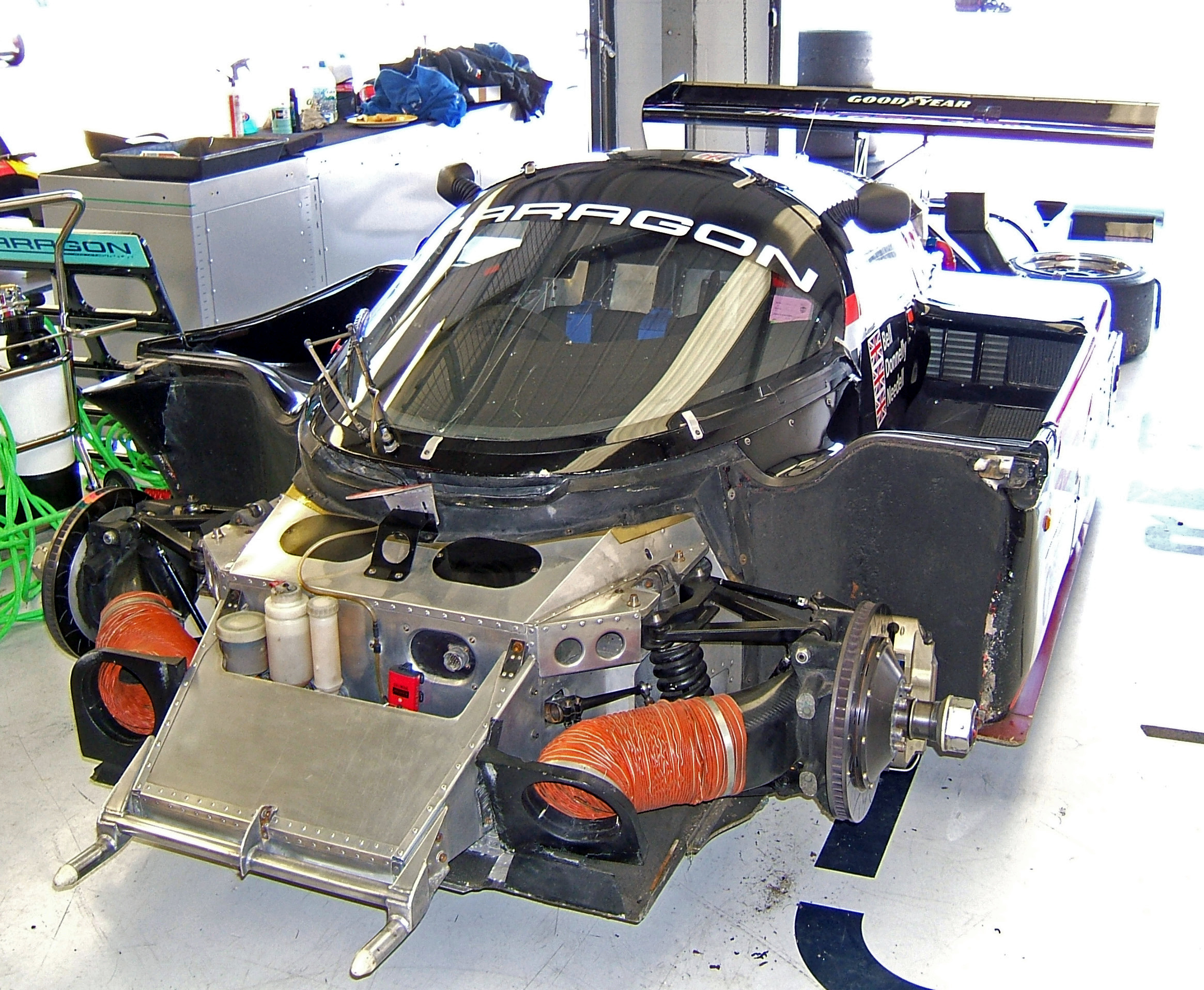
The custom front-end of a 962C GTi chassis

As the 1987 season continued on, modifications were made to the front bodywork of the car as well. The fenders and nose were rounded off, while the front brake cooling ducts and smaller headlights featured an all-new design. These front end improvements were continued into 1988 with the construction of another car, chassis #200. The central gap on the bottom of the nose was filled in, allowing for the relocation of the brake cooling ducts towards the center of the car, while an extended splitter was added to aid front downforce. At the rear, Nigel Stroud adapted a design element which had been used by TWR-Jaguar: bodywork panels covered the sides of the rear wheels of the car, allowing for better airflow.

Chassis #201 joined the team in 1989, identical to the other team car. The new car initially retained the rear wheel covers that #200 had used for improved aerodynamic performance, but they were later removed in 1990. The brake cooling ducts were also moved into larger openings higher on the nose.

Two further 962C GTi chassis were constructed by GTi Engineering. Dyson Racing purchased chassis #202, which they further modified for the Camel GT Championship, becoming known as DR1. Dyson's 962C GTi won a single event in San Antonio, Texas. ADA Engineering received #203 for the 1992 24 Hours of Le Mans before using it again in 1994 with Team Nippon. Chassis #106B was sold after Richard Lloyd had replaced it, and it ended up in the All Japan Sports Prototype Championship in the hands of Trust Racing Team from 1988 to 1990, then the Nisseki Racing Team in 1991. Chassis #200 also ran in Japan under the Alpha Cubic banner in 1990.
