= Alan Curnow =

British racing driver (born 1948)

- Nationality: (United Kingdom) British
- Born: 26 March 1948 (age 78) Malta

British Saloon Car Championship
- Years active: 1977, 1979–1986
- Teams: Patrick Motor Group; Longman Racing
- Starts: 94
- Wins: 0 (15 in class)
- Poles: 0
- Fastest laps: 19
- Best finish: 2nd in 1980

Championship titles
- 1980: British Saloon Car Championship - Class A

Alan Curnow is a British former racing driver. He raced saloon and touring cars between 1966 and 1991. In 1980 he finished runner-up in the British Saloon Car Championship, winning Class A in a Ford Fiesta. His son Ross is also a racing driver.

== Racing record ==
=== Complete British Saloon Car Championship results ===
(key) (Races in bold indicate pole position; races in italics indicate fastest lap.)

Year	Team	Car	Class	1	2	3	4	5	6	7	8	9	10	11	12	DC	Pts	Class
1977	Patrick Motor Group	Mini 1275 GT	A	SIL	BRH; Ret	OUL; 3†	THR ?	SIL ?	THR	DON; 5†	SIL; 17	DON; Ret†	BRH	THR ?	BRH	15th	15	**3rd**
1979	Datapost Racing	Mini 1275 GT	A	SIL; 13	OUL; Ret†	THR; 30	SIL; 19	DON ?	SIL ?	MAL; 4†	DON ?	BRH ?	THR	SNE ?	OUL ?†	7th	49	**2nd**
1980	Datapost Racing	Ford Fiesta	A	MAL ?†	OUL ?†	THR; 13	SIL; 19	SIL; 11	BRH ?	MAL; 6†	BRH; Ret	THR ?	SIL; 21			**2nd**	**73**	**1st**
1981	Team Datapost Racing with Hepolite and Esso	Austin Metro 1300 HLS	A	MAL; Ret†	SIL; 12	OUL; 6†	THR ?	BRH ?†	SIL ?	SIL; 25	DON; 7†	BRH; 15	THR ?	SIL; 12		9th	48	**3rd**
1982	Royal Mail Datapost Racing with Esso	Austin Metro 1300 HLS	A	SIL ?	MAL; Ret†	OUL; Ret†	THR; Ret	THR; 14	SIL; 16	DON; 12	BRH; Ret	DON; Ret	BRH; 17	SIL; Ret		15th	28	4th
1983	Royal Mail Datapost	Ford Escort RS1600i	C	SIL; 9	OUL ?	THR; Ret	BRH; 9	THR; 8	SIL; Ret	DON; 13	SIL; 14	DON; 12	BRH; 13	SIL; 11		4th	42	**3rd**
1984	Royal Mail Datapost	Ford Escort RS1600i	C	DON; 15	SIL; 13	OUL; 18	THR; Ret	THR; 17	SIL ?	SNE; 15	BRH; 12	BRH; 14	DON; 15	SIL; 14		6th	43	**3rd**
1985	Royal Mail Datapost	Ford Escort RS1600i	C	SIL; 13	OUL; 8	THR; 7	DON; 11	THR; Ret	SIL; 13	DON; Ret	SIL; Ret	SNE; 13	BRH; 9	BRH; 13	SIL; 11	5th	52	**3rd**
1986	Royal Mail Datapost	Ford Escort RS Turbo	B	SIL; Ret	THR; 8	SIL; 5	DON; Ret	BRH; 19	SNE; 4	BRH; 6	DON; Ret	SIL; 5				8th	32	**3rd**

† Events with 2 races staged for the different classes.
