= 1975 British Saloon Car Championship =

18th season of the British Touring Car Championship

Seasons
- ← 1974 1976 →

The 1975 RAC Southern Organs British Saloon Car Championship was the 18th season of the championship. The title was won by Andy Rouse, driving a Triumph Dolomite Sprint.

== Calendar & Winners ==
All races were held in the United Kingdom. Overall winners in bold.

Round		Circuit	Date	Class A Winner	Class B Winner	Class C Winner	Class D Winner
1	A	Mallory Park, Leicestershire	9 March	Not contested.		(United Kingdom) Gordon Spice	(United Kingdom) **Richard Lloyd**
1	B	Mallory Park, Leicestershire	9 March	(United Kingdom) Win Percy	(United Kingdom) **Andy Rouse**	Not contested.	
2		Brands Hatch, Kent	16 March	(United Kingdom) Jenny Birrell	(United Kingdom) Andy Rouse	(United Kingdom) Holman 'Les' Blackburn	(United Kingdom) **Stuart Graham**
3	A	Oulton Park, Cheshire	26 March	(United Kingdom) Win Percy	(United Kingdom) **Andy Rouse**	Not contested.	
3	B	Oulton Park, Cheshire	26 March	Not contested.		(United Kingdom) Gordon Spice	(United Kingdom) **Stuart Graham**
4		Thruxton Circuit, Hampshire	31 March	(United Kingdom) Win Percy	(United Kingdom) Andy Rouse	(United Kingdom) Holman 'Les' Blackburn	(United Kingdom) **Richard Lloyd**
5		Silverstone Circuit, Northamptonshire	13 April	(United Kingdom) Win Percy	(United Kingdom) Andy Rouse	(United Kingdom) Gordon Spice	(United Kingdom) **Richard Lloyd**
6	A	Brands Hatch, Kent	20 April	(United Kingdom) Bernard Unett	(United Kingdom) **Barrie Williams**	Not contested.	
6	B	Brands Hatch, Kent	20 April	Not contested.		(United Kingdom) Gordon Spice	(United Kingdom) **Richard Lloyd**
7		Thruxton Circuit, Hampshire	11 May	(United Kingdom) Win Percy	(United Kingdom) Andy Rouse	(United Kingdom) Gordon Spice	(United Kingdom) **Stuart Graham**
8	A	Silverstone Circuit, Northamptonshire	26 May	(United Kingdom) Win Percy	(United Kingdom) **Andy Rouse**	Not contested.	
8	B	Silverstone Circuit, Northamptonshire	26 May	Not contested.		(United Kingdom) John Handley	(United Kingdom) **Stuart Graham**
9	A	Mallory Park, Leicestershire	15 June	(United Kingdom) Bernard Unett	(United Kingdom) **Andy Rouse**	Not contested.	
9	B	Mallory Park, Leicestershire	15 June	Not contested.		(United Kingdom) Gordon Spice	(United Kingdom) **Stuart Graham**
10		Snetterton Motor Racing Circuit, Norfolk	29 June	(United Kingdom) Bernard Unett	(United Kingdom) Roger Bell	(United Kingdom) Gordon Spice	(United Kingdom) **Stuart Graham**
11		Silverstone Circuit, Northamptonshire	19 July	(United Kingdom) Win Percy	(United Kingdom) Andy Rouse	(United Kingdom) John Handley	(United Kingdom) **Stuart Graham**
12	A	Ingliston, Edinburgh	17 August	Not contested.	(United Kingdom) Andy Rouse	Not contested.	(United Kingdom) **Vince Woodman**
12	B	Ingliston, Edinburgh	17 August	(United Kingdom) **Win Percy**	Not contested.	(United Kingdom) Stuart Rolt	Not contested.
13	A	Brands Hatch, Kent	25 August	(United Kingdom) Win Percy	(United Kingdom) **Andy Rouse**	Not contested.	
13	B	Brands Hatch, Kent	25 August	Not contested.		(United Kingdom) John Handley	(United Kingdom) **Vince Woodman**
14		Oulton Park, Cheshire	7 September	(United Kingdom) Stan Clark	(Australia) Brian Muir	(United Kingdom) Chris Craft	(United Kingdom) **Vince Woodman**
15		Brands Hatch, Kent	19 October	(United Kingdom) Win Percy	(United Kingdom) Andy Rouse	(United Kingdom) John Handley	(United Kingdom) **Stuart Graham**

== Championship results ==
Driver's championship
Pos.	Driver	Car	Points
1	(United Kingdom) Andy Rouse	Triumph Dolomite Sprint	78
2	(United Kingdom) Win Percy	Toyota Celica GT	78
3	(United Kingdom) Stuart Graham	Chevrolet Camaro Z28	78
4	(United Kingdom) Richard Lloyd	Chevrolet Camaro Z28	65

== Manufacturers results ==
Pos.	Car	Class	Points
1	Chevrolet Camaro	D	81
=	Triumph Dolomite	B	81
3	Toyota Celica	A	78
4	Ford Capri	C	72
5	Opel Commodore	C	61
6	Hillman Avenger	A	58
