= Tony Dron =

British racing driver (1946–2021)

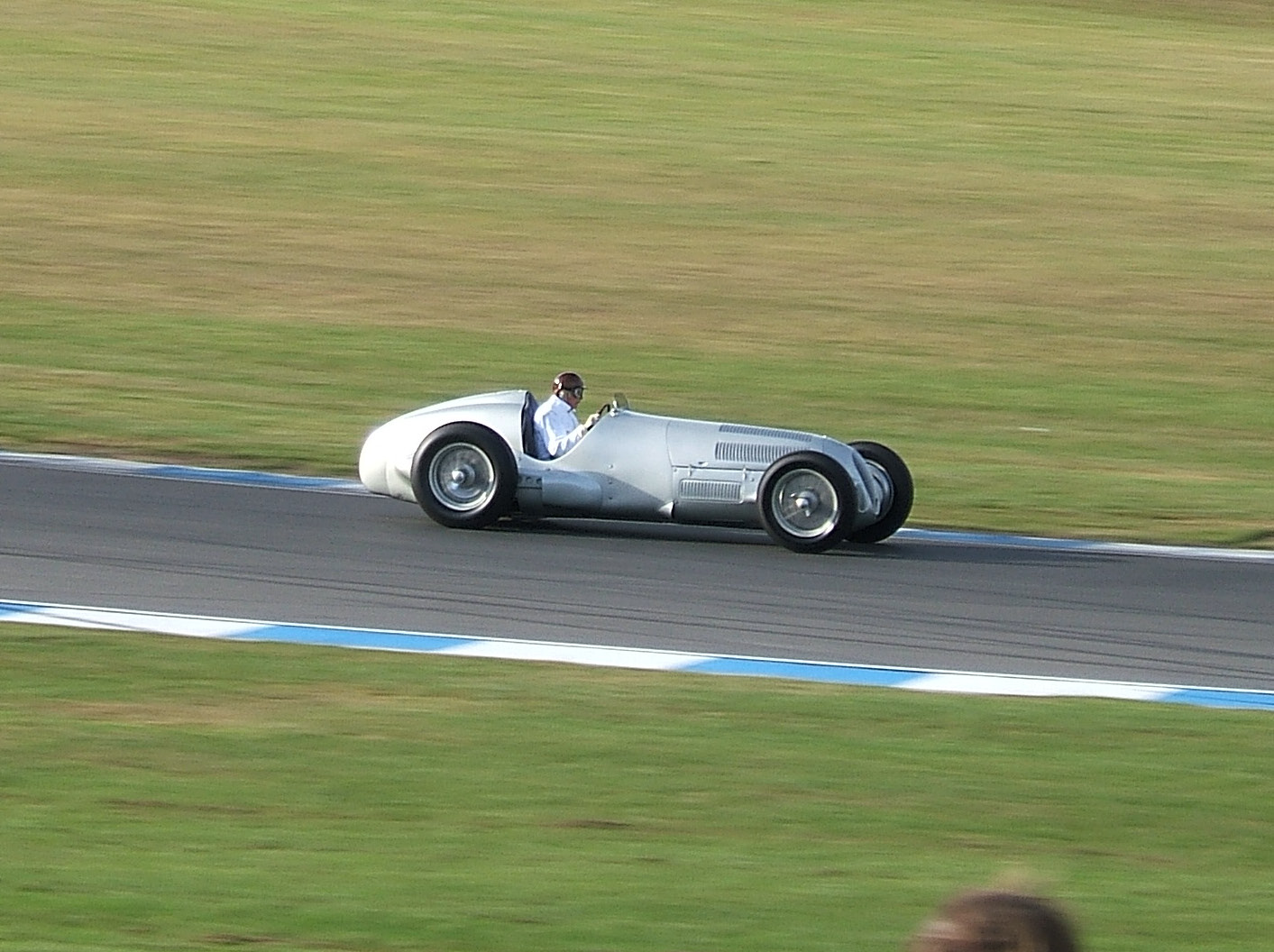
- Dron driving a Mercedes-Benz W125 at Donington Park in 2007
- Nationality: (United Kingdom) British
- Born: 29 August 1946 Surbiton, Surrey, England
- Died: 16 November 2021 (aged 75) Cambridge, Cambridgeshire, England

British Saloon / Touring Car Championship
- Years active: 1974–1975, 1977–1978, 1984, 1987
- Teams: Team Broadspeed Castrol; Penthouse Racing; British Leyland; Team Toyota GB; Chris Hodgetts Motor Sport
- Starts: 47
- Wins: 6 (12 in class)
- Poles: 9 (14 in class)
- Fastest laps: 6 (12 in class)
- Best finish: 2nd in 1977

Championship titles
- 1977, 1978: BSCC - Class C

Anthony Middleton Dron (29 August 1946 – 16 November 2021) was a British racing driver, motoring author, and journalist.

== Racing history ==
Dron was best known for racing Touring Cars in the 1970s (Triumph Dolomites for the works BL/Broadspeed team) and for competing in Porsches at the 24 Hours of Le Mans in the early-to-mid-1980s, including a class win at Le Mans in 1982 in a Porsche 934, and driving a Group C (Kremer CK-5) in 1983. He was a full-time professional race driver from 1974 to 1979, for teams that included British Leyland, Unipart and Alfa UK, but his career as a racer first began in May 1968 and continued for a full 43 years.

Dron achieved a remarkable range of victories, winning events in 24 makes and 41 models of car. (These are actual wins, not all the makes and models in which he competed.) The total number of wins is not known, but is well into the hundreds.

Race wins have been recorded in:

- Alfa Romeo: 1600GT Junior, TZ1
- Allard: JR
- Aston Martin: DB4
- Austin: Metro
- Austin-Healey: 3000, 100/4
- Bentley: 3-litre
- BMW: Counties 3 Series, M3
- Caterham: Seven (two types)
- Chevrolet: Camaro
- Datsun: 240Z
- Ferrari: 330LMB, 246S
- Fiat: 128 1300GT Coupé
- Ford: Escort Mexico, Falcon, Zephyr Mk II, fwd RS2000
- Jaguar: Mk 1, Mk 2, D-type
- Lister: Jaguar "Knobbly"
- Lotus: Mk 9
- Lola: Mk6GT
- Mazda: 323
- MG: Maestro, MGB
- Morgan: Plus 8
- Porsche: 924, 924GTR, 911RSL, 928S2, 928S4, 930, 934, "935", 911 Carrera 2
- Renault: 5
- Triumph: TR4, Dolomite Sprint
- TVR: Tuscan

In later years, Dron was also seen racing (and winning in) an enormous variety of historic cars, including the Le Mans-winning 1959 Aston Martin DBR1 and the 1960 Ferrari 246S Dino. In the Ferrari, Dron won the Sussex Trophy at the Goodwood Revival for three consecutive years. Having competed numerous times in the modern Nürburgring 24 Hours, he was known to be a highly experienced competitor on the old Nordschleife, where historic racing victories include an outright win in the 1996 Eifel Klassik in a 1963 Ferrari 330LMB, from pole position in a field of 180 cars.

Dron retired from race driving in 2011, although he still worked as a motoring journalist and test driver for Octane magazine.

== Publications ==
Dron wrote a regular column in Octane. He was the author of several books, including Porsche: Engineering for Excellence (2008) and Alan Mann – A Life of Chance (2012, with Alan Mann), and was editor of the monthly magazine "Classic Cars" during the 1980s and early 1990s.

== Racing record ==
=== Complete British Saloon / Touring Car Championship results ===
(key) (Races in bold indicate pole position; races in italics indicate fastest lap.)

| Year | Team | Car | Class | 1 | 2 | 3 | 4 | 5 | 6 | 7 | 8 | 9 | 10 | 11 | 12 | 13 | 14 | 15 | Pos. | Pts | Class |
|---|---|---|---|---|---|---|---|---|---|---|---|---|---|---|---|---|---|---|---|---|---|
| 1974 | Team Broadspeed Castrol | Triumph Dolomite Sprint | B | MAL; Ret† | BRH; DSQ | SIL ovr:9 cls:2 | OUL ovr:7 cls:2 | THR ovr:6 cls:3 | SIL ovr:9 cls:3 | THR ovr:5 cls:3 | BRH ovr:8 cls:3 | ING ovr:5† cls:5† | BRH ovr:6† cls:6† | OUL ovr:? cls:3 | SNE | BRH ovr:5 cls:2 | | | 11th | 38 | **3rd** |
| 1975 | Penthouse Racing | Alfa Romeo 1600 GT Junior | A | MAL ovr:?† cls:3† | BRH ovr:16 cls:3 | OUL ovr:7† cls:4† | THR ovr:? cls:3 | SIL; Ret | BRH | THR ovr:? cls:3 | SIL | MAL ovr:7† cls:3† | SNE | SIL ovr:? cls:2 | ING; Ret† | BRH | OUL | BRH | 17th | 29 | 5th |
| 1977 | British Leyland | Triumph Dolomite Sprint | C | SIL ovr:3 cls:1 | BRH ovr:2 cls:1 | **OUL** ovr:1† cls:1† | THR ovr:7 cls:1 | SIL; Ret | **THR** ovr:2 cls:1 | DON ovr:2† cls:1† | **SIL** ovr:1 cls:1 | **DON** ovr:1† cls:1† | **BRH** ovr:1 cls:1 | **THR** ovr:1 cls:1 | **BRH** ovr:5 cls:2 | | | | **2nd** | **52** | **1st** |
| 1978 | British Leyland | Triumph Dolomite Sprint | C | **SIL** ovr:1 cls:1 | **OUL** ovr:5† cls:1† | THR ovr:5 cls:1 | BRH ovr:2† cls:1† | SIL ovr:5† cls:1† | DON ovr:6† cls:1† | MAL ovr:7† cls:1† | BRH ovr:6 cls:1 | DON; DSQ† | BRH ovr:? cls:4 | THR ovr:? cls:3 | OUL; Ret† | | | | **3rd** | **83** | **1st** |
| 1984 | Team Toyota GB / Hughes of Beaconsfield | Toyota Celica Supra | A | DON | SIL ovr:4 cls:4 | OUL | THR | THR | SIL | SNE | BRH | BRH | DON | SIL | | | | | 24th | 3 | 15th |
| 1987 | Chris Hodgetts Motor Sport | Toyota Corolla GT | D | SIL | OUL | THR | THR | SIL | SIL | BRH | SNE | DON ovr:13‡ cls:3‡ | OUL | DON | SIL | | | | NC | 0 | NC |

† Events with 2 races staged for the different classes.

‡ Guest driver - Not eligible for points.
