= Gordon Spice =

British racing driver (1940–2021)

- Nationality: (United Kingdom) British
- Born: Gordon Edward George Spice; 18 April 1940 London, England
- Died: 9 September 2021 (aged 81)
- Retired: ca. 1989

World Endurance Championship
- Years active: 1980–1989
- Teams: Spice Engineering, Rondeau
- Starts: 50
- Wins: 0
- Best finish: 1st in C2 class in 1988; 10th in overall standings in 1987

Previous series
- 1960s–1980: British Touring Car Championship

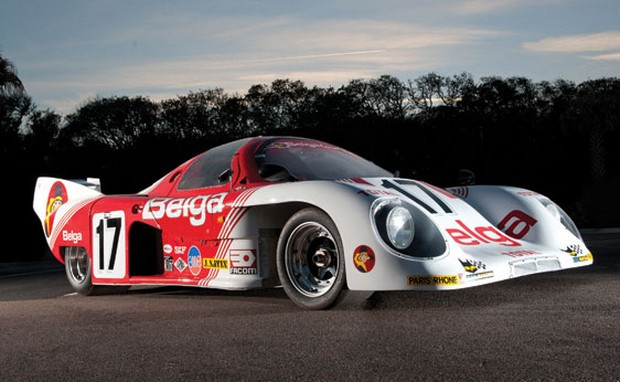
1980 Rondeau M379 B (chassis #002, built as M379 in 1979) - driven by Gordon Spice (GB)/Jean-Michel Martin (B)/Philippe Martin (B)

Gordon Edward George Spice (18 April 1940 – 10 September 2021) was a British racing driver who competed in both sports cars and Touring Car racing in the 1960s and 1970s, before starting Spice Engineering with fellow racing driver Ray Bellm in the 1980s.

== Racing career ==
Spice was most notable for his involvement with the Ford Capri, both as a driver and as part of Spice Engineering. Starting off his British Saloon Car Championship career racing Minis in the late 1960s for Downton Engineering Spice went on to paid drives in Minis for Jim Whitehouse’s Equipe Arden team in 1968 (winners of the British Saloon Car Championship title with a Mini the year later with Alec Poole) and raced John Cooper’s team Minis with Steve Neal in 1969 but despite Spice’s pace and occasional race win were outclassed by the 1300 Broadspeed Ford Escorts. Gordon eventually progressed to the works Ford team, CC Developments, co-run by Dave Cook, running the Capri 3.0S. He won his class on five occasions between 1976 and 1980, but never won the championship outright. In all, he took 24 overall race victories. In 1980, he took on Andy Rouse as teammate, and the two dominated their class, only losing out on the title to Win Percy.

In the 1980s, Spice competed in the World Endurance Championship with his own cars, under the banner Spice Engineering, or those of Jean Rondeau. He won the C2 class in the World Championship in 1988.

Spice, as well as running a car accessory shop in Ashford (Middlesex), in the early days of car accessory retailing, he co-founded in 1971, with his brother Derek, Gordon Spice Cash And Carry. They supplied motor accessories to trade customers and, at the peak of the business, they had cash and carry depots in Staines, Watford, Canning Town and Leicester. Subsequent flotation as a PLC in 1986, and an over ambitious investment in a state-of-the-art central distribution centre, plus changing market conditions, led to the demise of the company.

== Personal life ==
Spice died on 10 September 2021 from cancer, at the age of 81.

== Racing record ==
=== Complete British Saloon Car Championship results ===
(key) (Races in bold indicate pole position; races in italics indicate fastest lap.)

Year	Team	Car	Class	1	2	3	4	5	6	7	8	9	10	11	12	13	14	15	Pos.	Pts	Class
1965	Gordon Spice	Austin Mini Cooper S	B	BRH	OUL	SNE	GOO	SIL	CRY	BRH; 2	OUL								25th	6	9th
1966	Gordon Spice	Austin Mini Cooper S	B	SNE	GOO	SIL; 16		BRH; 10											19th	12	5th
1966	Gordon Spice	Morris Mini Cooper S	B				CRY; 2†		BRH; 8	OUL; 5†	BRH; DNS								19th	12	5th
1967	Gordon Spice	Morris Mini Cooper S	B	BRH; 5	SNE; Ret	SIL ?	SIL; 5	MAL; 3†	SIL ?	SIL ?	BRH; Ret	OUL; 3†	BRH; Ret						10th	24	**3rd**
1968	Equipe Arden	Austin Mini Cooper S	A	BRH ?	THR; 10	SIL; 13	CRY; Ret†	MAL; Ret†	BRH ?	SIL; 23	CRO; 11	OUL; 15	BRH; Ret	BRH; 14					7th	40	**1st**
1969	Britax-Cooper-Downton	Morris Mini Cooper S	B	BRH; 4	SIL; 6	SNE; Ret	THR; 6	SIL; Ret	**CRY**; 1†	MAL; 1†	CRO; 7	SIL; 7	OUL; 14	BRH; 11	BRH; 14				5th	47	**2nd**
1970	Equipe Arden	Morris Mini Cooper S	B	BRH	SNE	THR	SIL; 5	CRY; 2†	SIL; 14	SIL; 18	CRO	BRH; 12	OUL; 10	BRH; 10	BRH; DNS				6th	48	**2nd**
1974	Wisharts Garages	Chrysler Hemi 'Cuda	D	MAL	BRH	SIL	OUL	THR	SIL; Ret	THR	BRH	ING	BRH	OUL	SNE	BRH			NC	0	NC
1975	Wisharts Garages	Ford Capri 3000 GT	C	MAL; 3†	BRH; Ret	OUL; 3†	THR	SIL; 10	BRH; 6†	THR; 7	SIL	MAL; 6†	SNE; 4	SIL; Ret	ING	BRH	OUL	BRH	7th	46	**1st**
1976	Wisharts Garages	Ford Capri II 3.0s	D	BRH; 1	SIL; 1	OUL; 2†	THR; 2	THR; 6	SIL; 1	BRH; Ret	**MAL**; 3†	SNE; 1†	BRH; 6						4th	58	**1st**
1977	Gordon Spice Racing	Ford Capri II 3.0s	D	**SIL**; 1	BRH; 7	OUL; 2†	**THR**; 2	SIL; 5	THR; Ret	**DON**; 3†	SIL; 8	DON; Ret†	BRH; 7	THR; 2	BRH; 1				5th	28	**1st**
1978	Gordon Spice Racing	Ford Capri III 3.0s	D	SIL; 3	OUL; 1†	**THR**; 1	**BRH**; 1†	SIL; 1†	DON; 2†	MAL; 1†	BRH; 9	DON; DSQ†	BRH; 2	**THR**; 1	OUL; 2†				4th	75	**1st**
1979	Gordon Spice Racing	Ford Capri III 3.0s	D	**SIL**; 1	**OUL**; 1†	THR; 1	**SIL**; 3	DON; 1†	SIL; 1	MAL; 4†	DON; 5	BRH; Ret	THR; 1	SNE	OUL; 4†				4th	75	**1st**
1980	Gordon Spice Racing	Ford Capri III 3.0s	D	MAL; 2†	**OUL**; 1†	**THR**; 1	**SIL**; Ret	SIL; Ret	**BRH**; 5	**MAL**; 1†	**BRH**; 1	THR; 1	SIL; 1						**3rd**	**67**	**1st**
1981	Gordon Spice Racing	Ford Capri III 3.0s	D	MAL; 11†	SIL; 2	OUL; 2†	**THR**; 2	BRH	SIL; 2	SIL; Ret	DON; 5†	BRH; 4	THR; 7	SIL; Ret					10th	38	4th
1982	Gordon Spice Racing	Ford Capri III 3.0s	D	SIL; 5	MAL; 3†	OUL; 1†	THR; 2	THR; 3	SIL; 4	DON; Ret	BRH; 2	DON; 3	**BRH**; Ret	SIL ?					11th	39	4th
1983	Gordon Spice Racing	Rover Vitesse	A	SIL	OUL	THR	BRH	THR	SIL; Ret	DON	SIL; 28	DON; 4	BRH; 5	SIL					21st	5	9th
1984	Team Toyota GB / Hughes of Beaconsfield	Toyota Celica Supra	A	DON	SIL	OUL	THR	THR	SIL; 6	SNE; 4	BRH	BRH	DON	SIL					21st	4	13th

† Events with 2 races staged for the different classes.

=== Complete Formula One non-championship results ===
(key)

Year	Entrant	Chassis	Engine	1	2	3	4	5	6	7	8
1970	Gordon Spice	Kitchiner K3A	Chevrolet 5.0 V8	ROC	INT; 14	OUL					
1971	Gordon Spice	McLaren M10B	Chevrolet 5.0 V8	ARG; NC	ROC	QUE	SPR	INT; 16	RIN	OUL; 15	VIC; 13
1972	Gordon Spice	Kitchmac M10B	Chevrolet 5.0 V8	ROC	BRA	INT; Ret	OUL	REP	VIC		

=== 24 Hours of Le Mans results ===
Year	Team	Co-Drivers	Car	Class	Laps	Pos.	Class Pos.
1964	(United Kingdom) Lawrence Tune Engineering	(United Kingdom) Chris Lawrence	Deep Sanderson 301	P 1.3	13	DNF	DNF
1978	(United Kingdom) Charles Ivey Racing	(Australia) Larry Perkins (United States) John Rulon-Miller	Porsche 911 Carrera RSR	IMSA GTX	278	14th	**2nd**
1979	(Japan) Dome Co. Ltd.	(United Kingdom) Chris Craft (United Kingdom) Tony Trimmer	Dome Zero RL	S +2.0	40	DNF	DNF
1980	(France) Belga Jean Rondeau	(Belgium) Philippe Martin (Belgium) Jean-Michel Martin	Rondeau M379	GTP	329	**3rd**	**1st**
1981	(France) Otis Jean Rondeau	(France) François Migault	Rondeau M379	GTP 3.0	335	**3rd**	**2nd**
1982	(France) Malardeau Automobiles Jean Rondeau	(France) François Migault (France) Xavier Lapeyre	Rondeau M382	C	150	DNF	DNF
1984	(United Kingdom) Spice-Tiga Racing	(United Kingdom) Ray Bellm (Australia) Neil Crang	Tiga GC84	C2	69	DNF	DNF
1985	(United Kingdom) Spice Engineering	(United Kingdom) Ray Bellm (Republic of Ireland) Mark Galvin	Spice-Tiga GC85	C2	312	14th	**1st**
1986	(United Kingdom) Spice Engineering	(United Kingdom) Ray Bellm (Belgium) Jean-Michel Martin	Spice SE86C	C2	257	19th	6th
1987	(United Kingdom) Spice Engineering	(Spain) Fermín Velez (France) Philippe de Henning	Spice SE86C	C2	321	6th	**1st**
1988	(United Kingdom) Spice Engineering	(United Kingdom) Ray Bellm (France) Pierre de Thoisy	Spice SE88C	C2	351	13th	**1st**
1989	(United Kingdom) Spice Engineering	(United Kingdom) Ray Bellm (United States) Lyn St. James	Spice SE89C	C1	229	DNF	DNF
