= 1979 British Saloon Car Championship =

22nd season of the British Touring Car Championship

Seasons
- ← 1978 1980 →

The 1979 RAC Tricentrol British Saloon Car Championship was the 22nd season of the championship. Richard Longman successfully defended his drivers title with his Mini 1275 GT.

== Calendar & Winners ==
All races were held in the United Kingdom. Overall winners in bold.

Round		Circuit	Date	Class A Winner	Class B Winner	Class C Winner	Class D Winner
1		Silverstone Circuit, Northamptonshire	25 March	(United Kingdom) Alan Curnow	(United Kingdom) Richard Lloyd	(United Kingdom) Tom Walkinshaw	(United Kingdom) **Gordon Spice**
2	A	Oulton Park, Cheshire	13 April	Not contested.		(United Kingdom) Tom Walkinshaw	(United Kingdom) **Gordon Spice**
2	B	Oulton Park, Cheshire	13 April	(United Kingdom) Richard Longman	(United Kingdom) **John Morris**	Not contested.	
3		Thruxton Circuit, Hampshire	16 April	(United Kingdom) Richard Longman	(United Kingdom) Richard Lloyd	(United Kingdom) Tom Walkinshaw	(United Kingdom) **Gordon Spice**
4		Silverstone Circuit, Northamptonshire	28 May	(United Kingdom) Richard Longman	(United Kingdom) Win Percy	(United Kingdom) Tom Walkinshaw	(United Kingdom) **Jeff Allam**
5		Donington Park, Leicestershire	24 June	(United Kingdom) Richard Longman	(United Kingdom) Win Percy	(United Kingdom) Tom Walkinshaw	(United Kingdom) **Gordon Spice**
6		Silverstone Circuit, Northamptonshire	15 July	(United Kingdom) Richard Longman	(United Kingdom) Richard Lloyd	(United Kingdom) Rex Greenslade	(United Kingdom) **Gordon Spice**
7	A	Mallory Park, Leicestershire	12 August	(United Kingdom) Richard Longman	(United Kingdom) **Win Percy**	Not contested.	
7	B	Mallory Park, Leicestershire	12 August	Not contested.		(United Kingdom) Rex Greenslade	(United Kingdom) **Colin Vandervell**
8		Donington Park, Leicestershire	19 August	(United Kingdom) Alan Curnow	(United Kingdom) Richard Lloyd	(United Kingdom) **Tom Walkinshaw**	(United Kingdom) Vince Woodman
9		Brands Hatch, Kent	27 August	(United Kingdom) Richard Longman	(United Kingdom) Richard Lloyd	(United Kingdom) Barrie Williams	(Australia) **Brian Muir**
10		Thruxton Circuit, Hampshire	9 September	(United Kingdom) Richard Longman	(United Kingdom) Richard Lloyd	(United Kingdom) Tom Walkinshaw	(United Kingdom) **Gordon Spice**
11*		Snetterton Motor Racing Circuit, Norfolk	23 September	(United Kingdom) Richard Longman	(United Kingdom) Win Percy	(United Kingdom) Tom Walkinshaw	(United Kingdom) **Jeff Allam**
12	A	Oulton Park, Cheshire	29 September	Not contested.		(United Kingdom) Tom Walkinshaw	(United Kingdom) **Stuart Graham**
12	B	Oulton Park, Cheshire	29 September	(United Kingdom) Richard Longman	(United Kingdom) **Richard Lloyd**	Not contested.	

- Night race.

== Championship results ==
Drivers championship
Pos.	Driver	Car	Points
1	(United Kingdom) Richard Longman	Mini 1275 GT	97
2	(United Kingdom) Tom Walkinshaw	Mazda RX-7	88
3	(United Kingdom) Richard Lloyd	Volkswagen Golf GTi	82
4	(United Kingdom) Gordon Spice	Ford Capri III 3.0S	75
5	(United Kingdom) Win Percy	Toyota Celica GT	70
6	(United Kingdom) Rex Greenslade	Triumph Dolomite Sprint	53
7	(United Kingdom) Alan Curnow	Mini 1275 GT	49
8	(United Kingdom) Jeff Allam	Ford Capri III 3.0S	48

Makes championship
Pos.	Make	Points
1	BL Mini	90
2	Ford	90
3	Mazda	84
4	Volkswagen	81
5	Toyota	75
6	Triumph	64
