= 1974 British Saloon Car Championship =

17th season of the British Touring Car Championship

Seasons
- ← 1973 1975 →

The 1974 RAC Castrol Anniversary British Saloon Car Championship was the 17th season of the series. The championship switched to Group 1 regulations in an effort to reduce costs. Bernard Unett won his first title, driving a 1600 cc Hillman Avenger.

== Calendar & Winners ==
All races were held in the United Kingdom. Overall winners in bold.

Round		Circuit	Date	Class A Winner	Class B Winner	Class C Winner	Class D Winner
1	A	Mallory Park, Leicestershire	10 March	(United Kingdom) Bernard Unett	(United Kingdom) **Andy Rouse**	Not contested.	
1	B	Mallory Park, Leicestershire	10 March	Not contested.		(United Kingdom) Ivan Dutton	(United Kingdom) **Stuart Graham**
2		Brands Hatch, Kent	17 March	(United Kingdom) Stan Clark	(United Kingdom) Rob Mason	(United Kingdom) Tony Lanfranchi	(United Kingdom) **Stuart Graham**
3		Silverstone Circuit, Northamptonshire	7 April	(United Kingdom) Stan Clark	(United Kingdom) Andy Rouse	(United Kingdom) Peter Hanson	(United Kingdom) **Stuart Graham**
4		Oulton Park, Cheshire	12 April	(United Kingdom) Bernard Unett	(United Kingdom) Andy Rouse	(United Kingdom) Peter Hanson	(United Kingdom) **Stuart Graham**
5		Thruxton Circuit, Hampshire	15 April	(United Kingdom) Bernard Unett	(United Kingdom) Andy Rouse	(United Kingdom) Peter Hanson	(United Kingdom) **Richard Lloyd**
6		Silverstone Circuit, Northamptonshire	12 May	(United Kingdom) Stan Clark	(United Kingdom) Barrie Williams	(United Kingdom) Peter Hanson	(United Kingdom) **Vince Woodman**
7		Thruxton Circuit, Hampshire	27 May	(United Kingdom) Bernard Unett	(United Kingdom) Andy Rouse	(United Kingdom) Tom Walkinshaw	(United Kingdom) **Richard Lloyd**
8		Brands Hatch, Kent	20 July	(United Kingdom) Bernard Unett	(United Kingdom) Andy Rouse	(United Kingdom) Tom Walkinshaw	(United Kingdom) **Stuart Graham**
9	A	Ingliston, Edinburgh	18 August	Not contested.		(United Kingdom) **Tom Walkinshaw**	(United Kingdom) Richard Lloyd
9	B	Ingliston, Edinburgh	18 August	(United Kingdom) Bernard Unett	(United Kingdom) **Tom Walkinshaw**	Not contested.	
10	A	Brands Hatch, Kent	26 August	(United Kingdom) Bernard Unett	(United Kingdom) **John Hine**	Not contested.	
10	B	Brands Hatch, Kent	26 August	Not contested.		(United Kingdom) Tom Walkinshaw	(United Kingdom) **Richard Lloyd**
11		Oulton Park, Cheshire	8 September	(United Kingdom) Bernard Unett	(United Kingdom) Barrie Williams	(United Kingdom) Tom Walkinshaw	(United Kingdom) **Stuart Graham**
NC		Silverstone Circuit, Northamptonshire	26 September	(United Kingdom) Bernard Unett	(United Kingdom) Tony Dron	(United Kingdom) Peter Hanson	(United Kingdom) **Stuart Graham**
12	A	Snetterton Motor Racing Circuit, Norfolk	6 October	Not contested.		(United Kingdom) Tony Lanfranchi	(United Kingdom) **Stuart Graham**
12	B	Snetterton Motor Racing Circuit, Norfolk	6 October	(United Kingdom) Bernard Unett	(United Kingdom) **Andy Rouse**	Not contested.	
13		Brands Hatch, Kent	20 October	(United Kingdom) John Markey	(United Kingdom) Barrie Williams	(United Kingdom) Tom Walkinshaw	(United Kingdom) **Stuart Graham**

== Championship results ==
Driver's championship
Pos.	Driver	Car	Team	Class	Points
1	(United Kingdom) Bernard Unett	Hillman Avenger 1500 GT	Chrysler Dealer Team	A	69
2	(United Kingdom) Andy Rouse	Triumph Dolomite Sprint	Team Broadspeed Castrol	B	67
3	(United Kingdom) Stuart Graham	Chevrolet Camaro Z28	Castrol	D	64
4	(United Kingdom) Tom Walkinshaw	Ford Capri 3000 GT	Shellsport	C	63
5	(United Kingdom) Peter Hanson	Opel Commodore GS/E	Dealer Opel Team	C	55
6	(United Kingdom) Tony Lanfranchi	BMW 3.0 CSi	Van Der Steen	C	51
7	(United Kingdom) Barrie Williams	Mazda Savanna RX-3	Team Castrol	B	51
8	(United Kingdom) Richard Lloyd	Chevrolet Camaro Z28	Rivers/Simoniz	D	47
9	(United Kingdom) Roger Bell	Hillman Avenger 1500 GT	Chrysler Dealer Team	A	42
10	(United Kingdom) Vince Woodman	Chevrolet Camaro Z28	VMW Motors – Team Esso Uniflo	D	39
11	(United Kingdom) Tony Dron	Triumph Dolomite Sprint	Team Broadspeed Castrol	B	38
12	(United Kingdom) John Handley	Triumph Dolomite Sprint	RCD	B	36
13	(United Kingdom) Holman Blackburn	Ford Capri 3000 GT	Hermetite Products	C	35
14	(United Kingdom) John Hine	Triumph Dolomite Sprint	Bill Shaw Racing/Shellsport	B	28
15	(United Kingdom) Simon Kirkby	Hillman Avenger 1500	Hartwell	A	23
16	(United Kingdom) Ivan Dutton	Ford Capri 3000 GT	Ivan Dutton	C	22
17	(United Kingdom) Rob Mason	Triumph Dolomite Sprint	Shellsport Arden	B	21
18	(United Kingdom) Stan Clark	Alfa Romeo 1600 GT Junior	Roger Clark Cars/Esso Uniflo	A	21
19	(United Kingdom) John Markey	Toyota Celica GT	Dealer Team Toyota	A	21
20	(United Kingdom) Jon Fletcher	Chevrolet Camaro Z28	Glazepta Products Ltd.	D	18
21	(United Kingdom) Melvyn Adams	Volkswagen Passat TS	Melvyn Adams	A	18
22	(Republic of Ireland) Martin Birrane	Ford Capri 3000 GT	Adlards of Brixton	C	15
23	(United Kingdom) Les Nash	Chevrolet Camaro Z28	Les Nash	D	14
24	(United Kingdom) Malcolm Kay	Chevrolet Camaro Z28	Malcolm Kay	D	12
25	(United Kingdom) Bob Ridgard	Chevrolet Camaro Z28	Bob Ridgard	D	12
