= 1978 British Saloon Car Championship =

21st season of the British Touring Car Championship

Seasons
- ← 1977 1979 →

The 1978 RAC Tricentrol British Saloon Car Championship was the 21st season of the British Saloon Car Championship. It was the first year that the championship was sponsored by Tricentrol. The drivers title was won by Richard Longman in a Mini 1275 GT, and was the first to be won by a Mini driver since 1969.

== Calendar & Winners ==
All races were held in the United Kingdom. Overall winners in bold.

| Round | | Circuit | Date | Class A Winner | Class B Winner | Class C Winner | Class D Winner |
|---|---|---|---|---|---|---|---|
| 1 | | Silverstone Circuit, Northamptonshire | 19 March | (United Kingdom) Richard Longman | (United Kingdom) Richard Lloyd | (United Kingdom) **Tony Dron** | (United Kingdom) Gerry Marshall |
| 2 | A | Oulton Park, Cheshire | 24 March | Not contested. | | (United Kingdom) Tony Dron | (United Kingdom) **Gordon Spice** |
| 2 | B | Oulton Park, Cheshire | 24 March | (United Kingdom) Richard Longman | (United Kingdom) **Richard Lloyd** | Not contested. | |
| 3 | | Thruxton Circuit, Hampshire | 27 March | (United Kingdom) Richard Longman | (United Kingdom) Richard Lloyd | (United Kingdom) Tony Dron | (United Kingdom) **Gordon Spice** |
| 4 | A | Brands Hatch, Kent | 1 April | (United Kingdom) Richard Longman | (United Kingdom) **Richard Lloyd** | Not contested. | |
| 4 | B | Brands Hatch, Kent | 1 April | Not contested. | | (United Kingdom) Tony Dron | (United Kingdom) **Gordon Spice** |
| 5 | A | Silverstone Circuit, Northamptonshire | 28 May | (United Kingdom) Richard Longman | (United Kingdom) **Richard Lloyd** | Not contested. | |
| 5 | B | Silverstone Circuit, Northamptonshire | 28 May | Not contested. | | (United Kingdom) Tony Dron | (United Kingdom) **Gordon Spice** |
| 6 | A | Donington Park, Leicestershire | 25 June | (United Kingdom) Richard Longman | (United Kingdom) **Richard Lloyd** | Not contested. | |
| 6 | B | Donington Park, Leicestershire | 25 June | Not contested. | | (United Kingdom) Tony Dron | (United Kingdom) **Chris Craft** |
| 7 | A | Mallory Park, Leicestershire | 2 July | Not contested. | | (United Kingdom) Tony Dron | (United Kingdom) **Gordon Spice** |
| 7 | B | Mallory Park, Leicestershire | 2 July | (United Kingdom) Rex Greenslade | (United Kingdom) **Richard Lloyd** | Not contested. | |
| 8 | | Brands Hatch, Kent | 16 July | (United Kingdom) Richard Longman | (United Kingdom) Richard Lloyd | (United Kingdom) Tony Dron | (United Kingdom) **Jeff Allam** |
| 9 | A | Donington Park, Leicestershire | 6 August | Not contested. | | None (winner disqualified) | None (winner disqualified) |
| 9 | B | Donington Park, Leicestershire | 6 August | (United Kingdom) Richard Longman | None (winner disqualified) | Not contested. | |
| 10 | | Brands Hatch, Kent | 28 August | (United Kingdom) Richard Longman | (United Kingdom) Win Percy | (United Kingdom) Barrie Williams | (Australia) **Brian Muir** |
| 11 | | Thruxton Circuit, Hampshire | 10 September | (United Kingdom) Richard Longman | (United Kingdom) Richard Lloyd | (United Kingdom) Barrie Williams | (United Kingdom) **Gordon Spice** |
| 12 | A | Oulton Park, Cheshire | 7 October | Not contested. | | (United Kingdom) Barrie Williams | (United Kingdom) **Tom Walkinshaw** |
| 12 | B | Oulton Park, Cheshire | 7 October | (United Kingdom) Richard Longman | (United Kingdom) **Richard Lloyd** | Not contested. | |

== Championship results ==
Driver's championship
| Pos. | Driver | Car | Points |
| 1 | (United Kingdom) Richard Longman | Mini 1275 GT | 100 |
| 2 | (United Kingdom) Richard Lloyd | Volkswagen Golf GTi | 90 |
| 3 | (United Kingdom) Tony Dron | Triumph Dolomite Sprint | 83 |
| 4 | (United Kingdom) Gordon Spice | Ford Capri III 3.0S | 75 |
