= 1977 British Saloon Car Championship =

20th season of the British Touring Car Championship

Seasons
- ← 1976 1978 →

The 1977 RAC Tricentrol British Saloon Car Championship was the 20th season of the championship. Bernard Unett won his third drivers title with a Chrysler Avenger GT.

== Calendar & Winners ==
All races were held in the United Kingdom. Overall winners in bold.

Round		Circuit	Date	Class A Winner	Class B Winner	Class C Winner	Class D Winner
1		Silverstone Circuit, Northamptonshire	6 March	(United Kingdom) Barrie Williams	(United Kingdom) Peter Hilliard	(United Kingdom) Tony Dron	(United Kingdom) **Gordon Spice**
2		Brands Hatch, Kent	20 March	(United Kingdom) Bernard Unett	None (no finishers)	(United Kingdom) Tony Dron	(United Kingdom) **Colin Vandervell**
3	A	Oulton Park, Cheshire	8 April	Not contested.		(United Kingdom) **Tony Dron**	(United Kingdom) Gordon Spice
3	B	Oulton Park, Cheshire	8 April	(United Kingdom) **Bernard Unett**	(United Kingdom) Richard Lloyd	Not contested.	
4		Thruxton Circuit, Hampshire	11 April	(United Kingdom) Bernard Unett	(United Kingdom) Richard Lloyd	(United Kingdom) Tony Dron	(United Kingdom) **Vince Woodman**
5		Silverstone Circuit, Northamptonshire	6 June	(United Kingdom) Bernard Unett	(United Kingdom) Martin Brundle	(United Kingdom) Jeff Allam	(United Kingdom) **Stuart Graham**
6		Thruxton Circuit, Hampshire	19 June	(United Kingdom) Bernard Unett	(United Kingdom) Richard Lloyd	(United Kingdom) Tony Dron	(United Kingdom) **Chris Craft**
7	A	Donington Park, Leicestershire	8 June	Not contested.		(United Kingdom) Tony Dron	(United Kingdom) **Stuart Graham**
7	B	Donington Park, Leicestershire	8 June	(United Kingdom) Bernard Unett	(United Kingdom) **Brian Pepper**	Not contested.	
8		Silverstone Circuit, Northamptonshire	16 July	(United Kingdom) Bernard Unett	(United Kingdom) Richard Lloyd	(United Kingdom) **Tony Dron**	(United Kingdom) Chris Craft
9	A	Donington Park, Leicestershire	7 August	Not contested.		(United Kingdom) **Tony Dron**	(United Kingdom) Chris Craft
9	B	Donington Park, Leicestershire	7 August	(United Kingdom) **Richard Longman**	(United Kingdom) Richard Lloyd	Not contested.	
10		Brands Hatch, Kent	28 August	(United Kingdom) Bernard Unett	(United Kingdom) Richard Lloyd	(United Kingdom) **Tony Dron**	(United Kingdom) Colin Vandervell
11		Thruxton Circuit, Hampshire	15 September	(United Kingdom) Bernard Unett	(United Kingdom) Brian Pepper	(United Kingdom) **Tony Dron**	(United Kingdom) Gordon Spice
12		Brands Hatch, Kent	16 October	(United Kingdom) Richard Longman	(United Kingdom) Richard Lloyd	(United Kingdom) Jeff Allam	(United Kingdom) **Gordon Spice**

== Championship results ==
Driver's championship
Pos.	Driver	Car	Points
1	(United Kingdom) Bernard Unett	Chrysler Avenger 1300 GT	52
2	(United Kingdom) Tony Dron	Triumph Dolomite Sprint	52
3	(United Kingdom) Richard Lloyd	Volkswagen Golf GTi	41
4	(United Kingdom) Jeff Allam	Vauxhall Firenza Magnum 2300	31
5	(United Kingdom) Gordon Spice	Ford Capri II 3.0S	28
5	(United Kingdom) Richard Longman	Mini 1275 GT	28
