= Toyota Celica GT Rally =

1990 video game

- Developer: Gremlin
- Publisher: Gremlin
- Programmer: Colin "Fungus" Dooley
- Artist: Bernie Drummond
- Platforms: Amiga, Amstrad CPC, MS-DOS, ZX Spectrum
- Release: 1990
- Genre: Racing
- Mode: Single-player

Toyota Celica GT Rally (sometimes abbreviated as GT Rally) is a racing computer game developed and published by Gremlin Graphics Software (later Gremlin Interactive) released for the Amiga, Amstrad CPC, and ZX Spectrum. It is an officially licensed game featuring the Toyota Celica GT and was first released in 1990.

The game consists of three racing competitions in as many countries: England, Mexico and Finland. The main differences are the weather conditions. For example, races in Finland puts the player against heavy snowing and icy roads, while Mexican races include limited visibility because of sandstorms.

Toyota Celica GT Rally received mixed to positive reviews. Critics praised the realism, graphics and sound, while criticism mostly focused on the co-driver feature, controls and time penalties.

== Gameplay ==
The gameplay consists of competing in three different races in as many countries; England, Mexico and Finland. Each race is split up into ten different sections, with the main objective being to reach the finish line in the fastest time possible. Up to four players can compete, but only one at a time.

Toyota Celica GT Rally employs a first-person view; the course is seen through the windshield, which is affected by the weather (rain, snow etc.). The weather conditions are also the main differences between the races:

- The English races feature occasional raining, affecting the visibility while turning the road wet and slippery.
- The Mexican races feature sandstorms, heavily affecting the visibility.
- The Finnish races feature heavy snowing and ice, heavily affecting both the visibility and the road.

Preparations before racing include choosing between manual/automatic gearbox, preparing the co-driver and practicing a course.

== Reception ==
Toyota Celica GT Rally received mixed to positive reviews. The graphics, realism and sound were praised while criticism mostly focused on the co-driver feature, controls and time penalties. Amiga Format reviewer Sean Masterson gave the game a score of 70%, praising the atmospheric sound while calling the game "a reasonable rally sim, but far from perfect", but criticized the timing of the co-driver calls and the "overly harsh time-keeping". Daniel Whitehead from Amiga Computing was less positive, giving a score of 39% and was critical of its controls. One of the most positive reviews came from Richard Leadbetter of Computer and Video Games, who gave the game a score of 87%. Leadbetter highly praised the graphics and sound, writing that "the mixture of polygon 3D and sprites is effective and the sound is brilliant".
