= Ingliston Racing Circuit =

Motor racing circuit in Edinburgh, Scotland

- Location: Edinburgh, Scotland
- Coordinates: 55°56′35″N 3°22′39″W
- Owner: Royal Highland Agricultural Society Of Scotland (RHASS)
- Opened: 11 April 1965; 61 years ago
- Closed: 16 September 1994; 31 years ago (officially)
- Major events: Dunfermline Car Club Rally, Ingliston Revival, Scottish Motor Racing Club (SMRC) Events, Various car club heats, Scottish Car Show, British Cycling

Full Circuit (1965–1994)
- Length: 1.030 mi (1.657 km)
- Turns: 12

Ingliston Racing Circuit is a 1.030 mi (1.658 km) motor racing circuit that was built at the Royal Highland Showground at Ingliston, Edinburgh. The circuit was created by widening and linking the network of access roads at the venue which had previously been used exclusively as an agricultural showground.

The first racing took place at Ingliston on 11 April 1965 and it fast became recognised as one of Scotland's top motorsport venues. The first race was almost 10 years before Knockhill in Fife opened in 1974 . Ingliston became infamous for its tight corners and plethora of obstacles such as trees and buildings close to the track and was therefore considered to be more hazardous than other similar facilities in the UK. There were extensive spectator facilities including a 5000-person grandstand which was built around the southern part of the track and thus named 'Arena'.

The venue saw many famous drivers compete at races including the late Jim Clark, Jackie Stewart, Stirling Moss and later David Coulthard.

== History ==
=== 1968 expansion ===
On 4 September 1968 the track re-opened benefiting from an extension to the northeast of 600 ft including a long straight leading to hairpin and back to left-hander where the new section rejoined the original circuit. This took the full circuit to a length of just over one mile, allowing for a more fulfilling experience for drivers and spectators alike and more racing as a result. Two circuits could be operated, the original or extended, both in a clockwise direction.

=== Scottish Motorsport Centre ===
In the winter of 1989 Sir Jackie Stewart publicly announced his plans for a Scottish Motorsport centre. An investment of £80 million was proposed to create a motoring centre of excellence, to include research and development facilities, showrooms and garages around the perimeter of the circuit. The plans received public approval but full funding was shortcoming and a planning application never submitted to Edinburgh District Council.

In addition to a two-mile Grand Prix standard racing circuit and motor industry test facilities, the New Ingliston proposals would embody a luxury hotel, multi-screen cinema, bowling alley, garden centre, ''autopark'' trading units, and heritage museum, within its perimeters.

Jackie Stewart, who designed the track, said his involvement with the McGregor Holdings concept which includes personal investment, came after persistent requests from throughout the world to participate in developing race circuits.

=== 1995 closure ===
During the downturn of the early 1990s the circuit started to fall behind modern standards. Increased competition from Knockhill Racing Circuit in Fife and a lack of investment in modern safety facilities as well as increased pressure from the venue for other non-motoring related activity spelled the end of motorsport at Ingliston. The track was de-commissioned and infrastructure removed, paving the way for the venue to pursue its main ambition as a public showground.

=== Today ===
Much of the original circuit remains in place with the only major missing piece being Arena, where a grandstand overlooking the main ring of the venue (used principally for the Royal Highland Show) has been constructed. Other parts of the track are used as access roads, car parking and for occasional track days and driving events. The pits area has been removed.

=== Revival ===
2015 saw the 50th anniversary of the circuit and a revival planned for September 2015. The event was planned to relive the excitement of old Ingliston where owners are invited to drive their cars on the re-opened circuit. The event attracted 11,000 people over the weekend.

The original circuit was built over at Arena, so an access road adjacent to the structure was widened and graded to allow a full-circuit to be drivable, the first time this was possible in over 20 years.

== Other uses ==
The northern part of Ingliston Racing Circuit is used by driving experience companies Experience Voucher and Ingliston, and also by the Dunfermline Car Club for rally and cycling races, amongst others.
