= Sea Truck =

Flat-hulled watercraft

The Rotork Sea Truck is a flat-hulled, high-speed watercraft, similar to a small landing craft. Made from fibreglass, they may be used to land vehicles without jetties or harbour facilities. They were designed by the design team at Smallfry in the 1970s.

== History ==
The vehicle was designed by the design team at Smallfry led by designer Tim Fry and Anthony Smallhorn with input from James Dyson while he was a student in the 1970s, as part of his final year's project at the Royal College of Art.

Jeremy Fry was co-designer, along with Dyson, who was working at Rotork at the time. Dyson used the Sea Truck as part of his final year's project at the Royal College of Art.

It happened to be the first engineering project for Dyson of the Dyson company, as he had not even learned welding before. He and Fry built the prototype together.

The craft was manufactured by Rotork Marine in Bath, England. It was a high-speed "flat-hulled fiberglass landing craft that could deliver cargo where no harbor or jetty was available."

According to Wired Magazine and Dyson, it was described as a "Welsh dresser on water," with Dyson saying he learned not to prioritize conventional appearances with his projects, as "what it did, it did rather well."

It was adopted for use by the oil and construction industries, as well as military use, and could carry three tons at 50 miles per hour. In 1973, the Sea Truck was used by the Egyptian army in the Yom Kippur War.

== Awards ==
In 1975, Dyson won the Duke of Edinburgh's Special Prize for his work on the Sea Truck.

In 1979, the Sea Truck won the Design Council Award for Engineering Products, and the Series 5 Sea Truck, credited to the Rotork Marine Design team with Tim Fry and Anthony Smallhorn of Smallfry Ltd. as consulting designer won the Prince Philip Designers Prize.

== Versions ==
There were five versions of the Sea Truck. Jeremy Fry invented the original Sea Truck and the Mark 2 version. Dyson as a student was involved in the Mark 3. The Mark 5 designed under John Fry by Mike Ross and styled by Tim Fry and Anthony Smallhorn won the design award.
