= Prince Philip Designers Prize =

Chartered Society of Designers award

- Description: Award for a design career of the highest standards and innovation
- Country: United Kingdom
- Presented by: Chartered Society of Designers (formerly Design Council)

The Prince Philip Designers Prize is an annual design recognition given by the Chartered Society of Designers and originally awarded by Prince Philip, Duke of Edinburgh (1921–2021).

It is the longest running design award in the United Kingdom, having been started in 1959, as the Duke of Edinburgh's Prize for Elegant Design. The recognition is on the basis of a design career which has upheld the highest standards and broken new ground.

It was agreed in December 2015, that the Chartered Society of Designers should re-introduce and manage it as a global prize after the Design Council had ceased in 2011, after managing it for 52 years.

== Winners ==
Year	Winner	Citation
1959	Charles Longman	Prestcold Packaway refrigeration for Pressed Steel Company
1960	Neal French	Apollo tableware for WT Copeland and Sons
1960	David White	Apollo tableware for WT Copeland and Sons
1961	Eric Marshall	Rio transistor radio for Ultra Radio & Television
1962	Nicholas Sekers	Furnishing fabrics for West Cumberland Silk Mills (Sekers Fabrics)
1963	Sir Kenneth Grange CBE RDI	Milward Courier cordless shaver for Henry Milward & Sons
1964	David Queensbury	Cut crystal glassware for Webb Corbett
1965	Peter Dickinson	Auditorium seating for Race Contracts
1966	Andrew Grima	Precious jewellery for HJ Co.
1967	R. David Carter	Wales Gas Board Gas-Flo system for Thomas Glover & Co.
1968	David Powell	Nova tableware for Ecko Plastics
1969	Jack Howe	MD2 cash dispenser for Chubb Ltd
1970	Patrick Rylands	Range of toys for Trendon Ltd.
1971	Derek Power	Atomic Physics teaching apparatus for Teltron Ltd (Teltron tube)
1972	Frank Thrower	Kitchen and table glassware for Dartington Glass Ltd.
1972	Dr John McArthur	Microscope for the Open University
1973	George Robins	Picture framing systems for Design Animations Ltd.
1974	Not awarded	
1975	Peter Milne	'Bullet' racing dinghy for Chippendale & Milne
1975	Dr David Dyson	MF400 Industrial Laser System for Ferranti Ltd
1976	Brian Blatchford	Modular Assembly Prosthesis for Chas. A Blatchford Ltd
1977	George Carroll	Mardrive linear transport
1978	John Fisher	Micro 2000 digital micrometer for PA Technology
1979	Tim Fry ("Smallfry Ltd")	Series 5 Sea Truck for Rotork Marine Ltd
1979	Anthony Smallhorn ("Smallfry Ltd")	Series 5 Sea Truck for Rotork Marine Ltd
1980	Plessey Avionics & Communications	Groundsat Radio Communications Facility
1981	Raymond Bates	Austin Metro for British Leyland
1981	Mark Snowdon	Austin Metro for British Leyland
1981	David Bache	Austin Metro for British Leyland
1982	Rediffusion Simulation	Advanced Technology Flight Simulator
1983	Alan Doe, Westland Helicopters ltd	30 series Helicopter
1983	Peter Huxtable	Dandy Clip for Wonderclip Ltd
1984	Collier Campbell	Six Views furnishing fabric for Fischbacher
1985	Robin Herd	March 84C racing car
1986	Patricia Roberts	85-86 Patchwork sampler collection
1987	Tony Fuge	IMS T414 Transputer for Inmos
1988	John Fisher	Keeler Pulsair Tonometer for PA Technology
1989	Rex Wilson	WTC Aircrafter Cutting Torch
1990	Barrie Weaver	Product Designer
1991	John Cundy	Engineering Designer
1992	David Crisp	Product Designer
1993	Alan Fletcher RDI	Graphic Designer
1994	Sir Michael Hopkins CBE	Architect
1995	Not awarded	
1996	Not awarded	
1997	Sir James Dyson CBE RDI	Product Designer
1998	Martin Lambie-Nairn RDI	Graphic Designer
1999	Bill Hills MBE	Engineering Designer
2000	Don Cameron	Engineering Designer
2001	Sir Kenneth Grange CBE RDI	Product Designer
2002	Geoff Kirk RDI	Engineering Designer
2003	Sir Terence Conran RDI	Multidisciplinary Designer
2004	Lord Foster RDI	Architect
2005	Derek Birdsall RDI	Graphic Designer
2006	Thomas Heatherwick RDI	Multidisciplinary Designer
2007	David Gentleman RDI	Graphic Designer -nominated for the prize by the Chartered Society of Designers (CSD)
2008	Max Fordham RDI	Engineer
2009	Andrew Ritchie	Engineering Designer
2010	Bill Moggridge	Interaction designer
2011	Sir Quentin Blake CBE RDI	Illustrator -nominated for the prize by the Chartered Society of Designers (CSD)
2016	John Makepeace OBE FCSD	Furniture designer/maker
2017	Shannon Martin	
