= Hillman Imp =

Small economy car produced by Rootes Group (1963-1976)

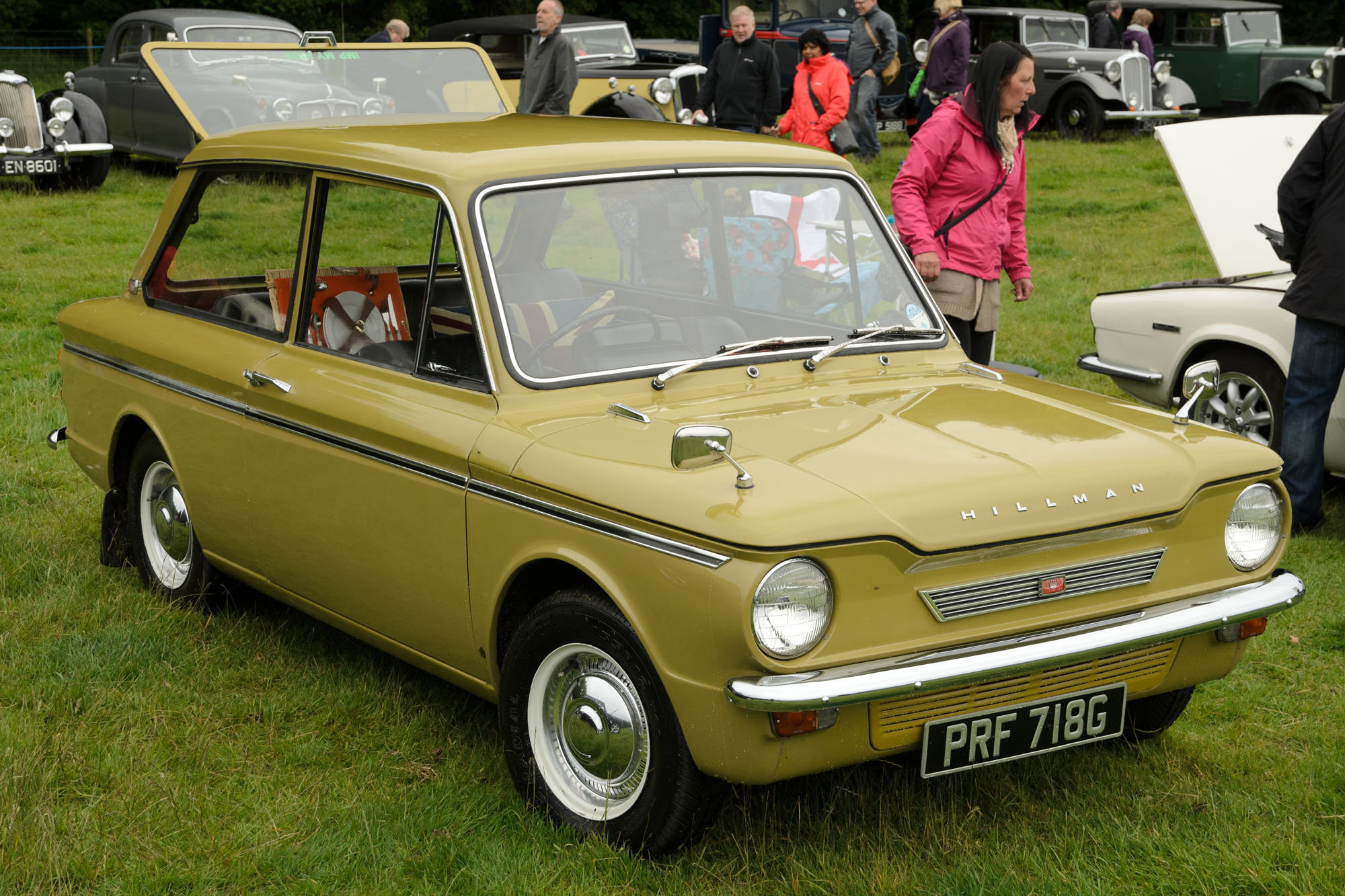
- 1968 Hillman Imp 2-door saloon

Overview
- Manufacturer: Rootes Group (1963–1967); Chrysler Europe (1967–1976)
- Also called: Hillman GT (Australia); Hillman Husky; Commer Imp Van; Singer Chamois; Sunbeam Imp; Sunbeam Sport; Sunbeam Chamois; Sunbeam Stiletto; Sunbeam Californian; Sunbeam 900
- Production: 1963–1976; 440,032 made
- Assembly: Linwood, Scotland; Australia; Costa Rica; Ireland; Malaysia; Malta; New Zealand; Philippines; Portugal; South Africa; Uruguay; Venezuela
- Designer: Michael Parkes; Tim Fry

Body and chassis
- Class: Economy Car
- Body style: 2-door coupe; 2-door saloon; 3-door estate (Husky); 3-door panel van
- Layout: RR layout
- Related: Bond 875; Clan Crusader; Ginetta G15; Davrian Demon/Imp; BS Nymph; Siva Llama; Beach Mk4

Powertrain
- Engine: 875 cc, 998 cc straight-4 overhead camshaft water-cooled aluminium block
- Transmission: 4-speed manual all-synchromesh

Dimensions
- Wheelbase: 2,082 mm (82.0 in)
- Length: 3,581 mm (141.0 in)
- Width: 1,524 mm (60.0 in)
- Height: 1,385 mm (54.5 in); Saloon; 1,330 mm (52.4 in); Coupe; 1,475 mm (58.1 in); Hillman Husky/Commer Imp
- Kerb weight: 725 kg (1,598 lb)

Chronology
- Successor: Chrysler Sunbeam

The Hillman Imp is a small economy car that was made by the Rootes Group and its successor Chrysler Europe from 1963 until 1976. Revealed on 3 May 1963, after much advance publicity, it was the first British mass-produced car with the engine block and cylinder head cast in aluminium.

This unorthodox small/light car was designed for the Rootes Group by Michael Parkes (who later became a Formula One driver) and Tim Fry. It was manufactured at the purpose-built Linwood plant in Scotland. As well as the Hillman marque, there was a series of variations, including an estate car (the Husky), a van and a coupé.

The Imp enjoyed modest success in both club and international rallying. Rootes introduced a homologation special called the Rally Imp in 1964. It featured many modifications over the standard model, the most important of which was an engine enlarged to 998 cc. Notable successes for this model include the 1965 Tulip Rally in which the works Imps of Rosemary Smith and "Tiny" Lewis finished first and second overall.

Considered ahead of its time, the Imp nevertheless suffered from reliability problems, which harmed its reputation and led to the Rootes Group being taken over by Chrysler Europe in 1967. The Imp continued in production until March 1976, selling just under half a million units in 13 years.

== History ==
=== Development ===
Known internally within the Rootes Groups as the APEX project, the Imp came about because of the fuel shortage caused by the Suez Crisis in 1956. Petrol was rationed in the UK, sales of the heavy cars for which Rootes was known had dramatically slumped, and there was a huge market for small economical cars with low fuel usage. The BMC's Mini had already taken advantage of the opportunity, with production starting in 1959. Although the project officially began in 1955, the market for small cars was soon recognised and it was evident that the project would evolve into Rootes' first small, economical car.

Seeing an opportunity, Mike Parkes and Tim Fry offered to design the car: "Well, Mike Parkes and I were very good friends. So we went to the director of engineering, B. B. Winter, and said to him we could design you just the car we want. And he said: 'Alright, get on with it then!'". The early stages of development presented "The Slug", which had clear similarities to a bubble car. However, the Rootes design board were not satisfied with this approach, and ordered the design team to press forward. That led to the next stage of the Slug, which appeared more utilitarian with appropriate styling.

Extensive road testing was carried out in Norway in winter conditions, East Africa summer weather and in Arctic conditions in Canada by a small team led by Ken Sharpe (Chief Development Engineer, Ryton)

Rootes did previously look at building a small car twice, even if both ultimately contributed little to the development of the Imp. The first being the 1938–1939 Little Jim prototype, which featured a conventional front-engined rear-wheel drive layout equipped with a 750 cc water-cooled engine followed later by the post-war rear-engined 1949 Little Jimmy prototype by Craig Miller that would make use of a Volkswagen-based twin-cylinder engine.

It was originally envisaged by Rootes the 742 cc Coventry Climax FWMA inspired engine would be available in three sizes, 800 cc, 875 cc and 998 cc. However it was not to be as through a combination of engineering production costs, Apex’s increased weight and size, together with experimental dry-liner 998 cc engines being unreliable, resulted in only the 875 cc engine being standardized at the cost of imposing a constraint on the Imp as a one-capacity car that competitors like the Mini did not experience. One alternative solution considered before being dropped was to develop a new taller block giving the engine a longer stroke whilst retaining the 875 cc engine's dry-liners, however this would have been an expensive procedure and would have only been worth the investment had the Imp been a success. A few long-stroke engines were built and evaluated, the work not completely going to waste as they would go on many years later to be bored out up to 1150 cc and used to great in effect in competition by the likes of Paul Emery, Andy Dawson, Ian Carter and others.

The later 998 cc engines in the Rallye Imps meanwhile would on the other hand make use of expensive wet-liners and were not really intended for road use, rather only for competition and further tuning. It was later discovered the largest reliable limit the 875 cc engine would tolerate was 948 cc, however in the absence of more development neither the 948 cc engine nor the envisaged 928 cc engine were used, the latter originally being proposed as early as the mid-1960s for a projected Mark III Imp that became a victim of Chrysler’s cost-cutting before it reappeared years later in the Chrysler Sunbeam.

=== Mark I Imp: 1963–1965 ===
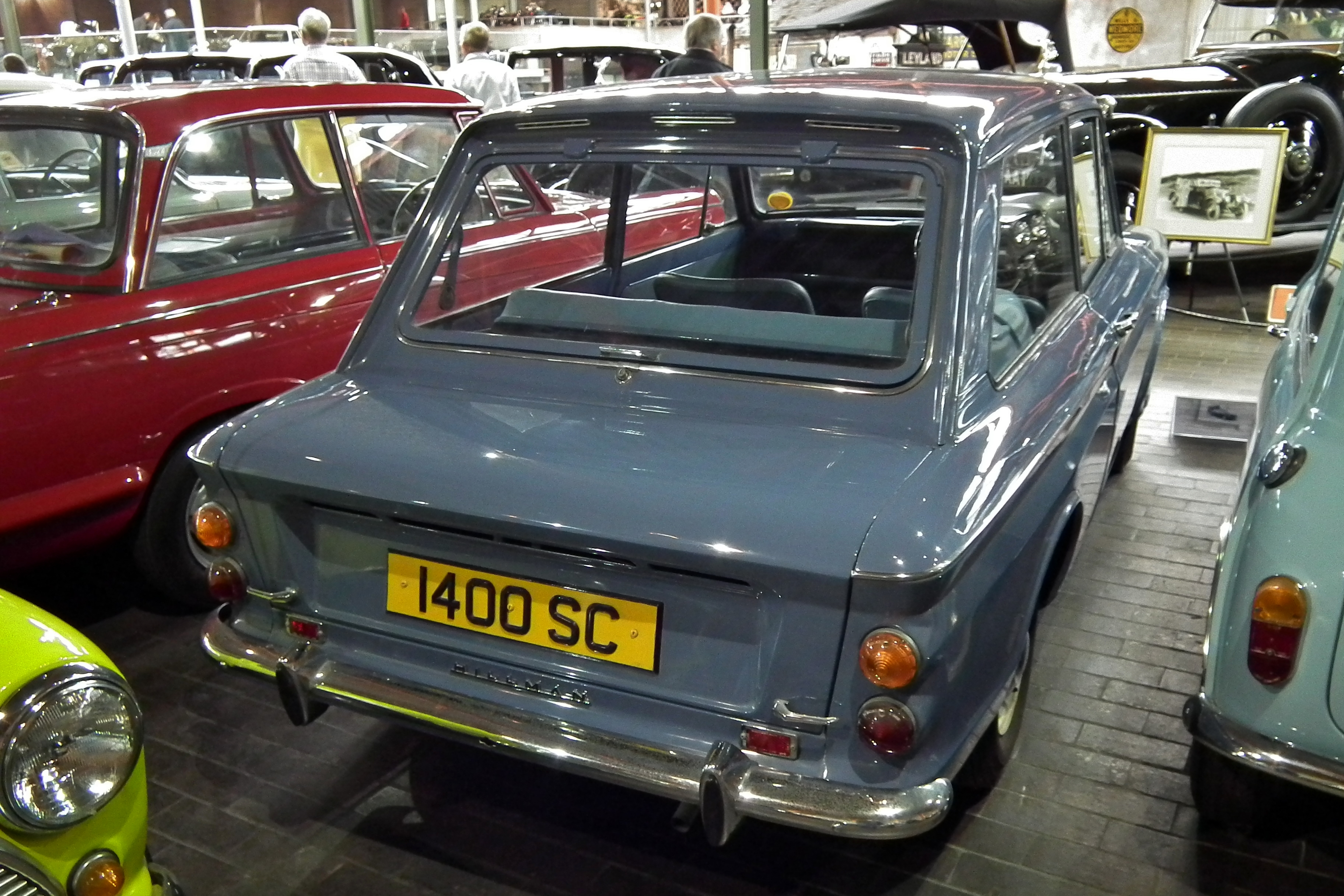
1963 Hillman Imp De Luxe in the National Motor Museum, Beaulieu

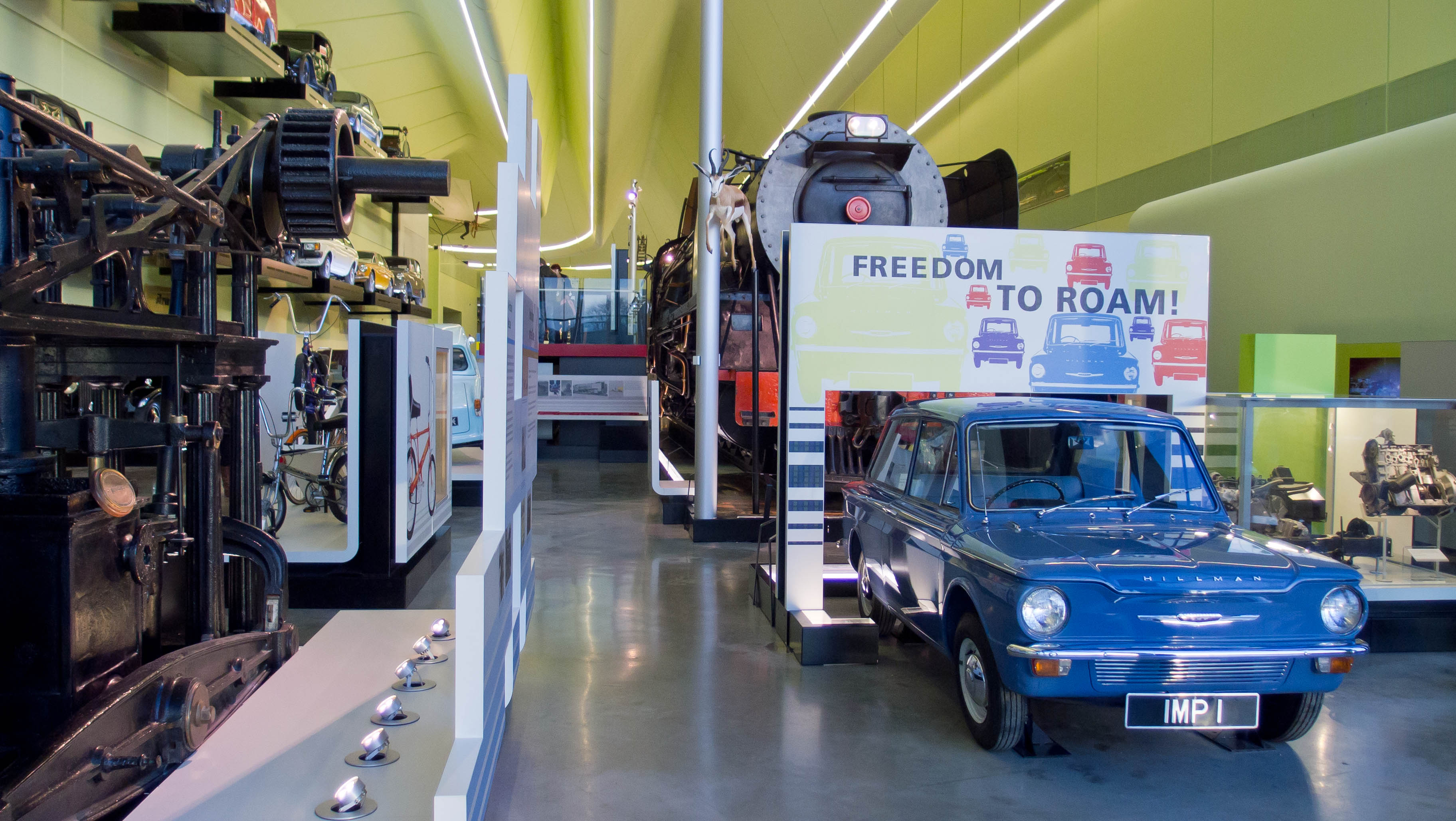
First Imp off the production line, displayed at the Glasgow Museum of Transport

The Hillman Imp was officially announced on 2 May 1963, when HRH Duke of Edinburgh was invited to open the factory in Linwood. After the opening, he then drove a silver Imp to Glasgow Airport. One of the first Imps produced is currently on display at the Glasgow Museum of Transport. Another early example from 1963 is at the National Motor Museum, Beaulieu, with the registration 1400 SC.

Before and after its announcement, the Imp garnered significant attention from the motoring press. In 1962, the Small Car & Mini Owner magazine published an article titled "Enter the AJAX!", particularly noting the all-aluminium water-cooled rear engine. The same year, the Daily Express published an article titled "It's the new 'baby'", calling it "the first baby car ever built by the Rootes Group". In June 1963, the Motor Sport magazine commented on the press' reaction to the Imp who strongly favoured the Imp in terms of its engine, gearbox and competitive price; at launch, the standard model cost £508 1s 3d, while the deluxe version was £532 4s 7d.

The name "Imp" was originally the name of an engine produced by Ailsa Craig Ltd., a manufacturer of marine engines. In 1962 the company was acquired by Warsop Fram Group, and all of Ailsa Craig Ltd's assets were up for sale. The Warsop Fram Group traded the Imp name to the Rootes Group in exchange for a new Humber Super Snipe motor car. The namesake was to emphasize its small-size, and to help it sell as the obvious competitor for the Mini.

The water-cooled four-cylinder power unit was inspired by the Coventry Climax FWMA engine, featuring an all-aluminium alloy overhead camshaft, combined with a full-synchromesh aluminium transaxle. This combination was very advanced at the time. Sir Alec Issigonis, designer of the BMC's Mini, had recently described the fitting of synchromesh on all forward gears as "impossible". Besides the engine's unique design, it was canted at a 45° angle to keep the center of gravity low and optimise road-holding.

As reported in tests such as The Practical Car and Driver, rear-engined cars generally suffer from oversteer handling characteristics to some extent, and to counteract that as much as possible, the Imp has a semi-trailing arm independent rear suspension system. The relatively costly and sophisticated solution, atypical for small-car design at the time, was insisted upon by its designers after lengthy testing of a Chevrolet Corvair with swing axles. To attain balanced handling, the Imp actually used swing axle geometry at the front, but that initially led to too much understeer, and the camber was later reduced by lowering the pivot points.

Gradually increasing in popularity in the UK, Mark I sales in 1963 were estimated at 33,000, and increased to 50,142 in 1964. However, Imp sales decreased in 1965 to 42,663. Reliability problems had quickly surfaced, mainly due to poor cooling of the rear engine, and the public image of the car was becoming negative. That was extremely worrying for the Rootes Group who were trying to compete with the Mini, production of which totalled 1,190,000 during the 1960s.

The Mark I was introduced as a 2-door saloon, which appeared in two models; the Basic and De Luxe. In October 1964, a luxury edition was introduced, known as the Singer Chamois.

=== Mark II Imp: 1965–1968 ===
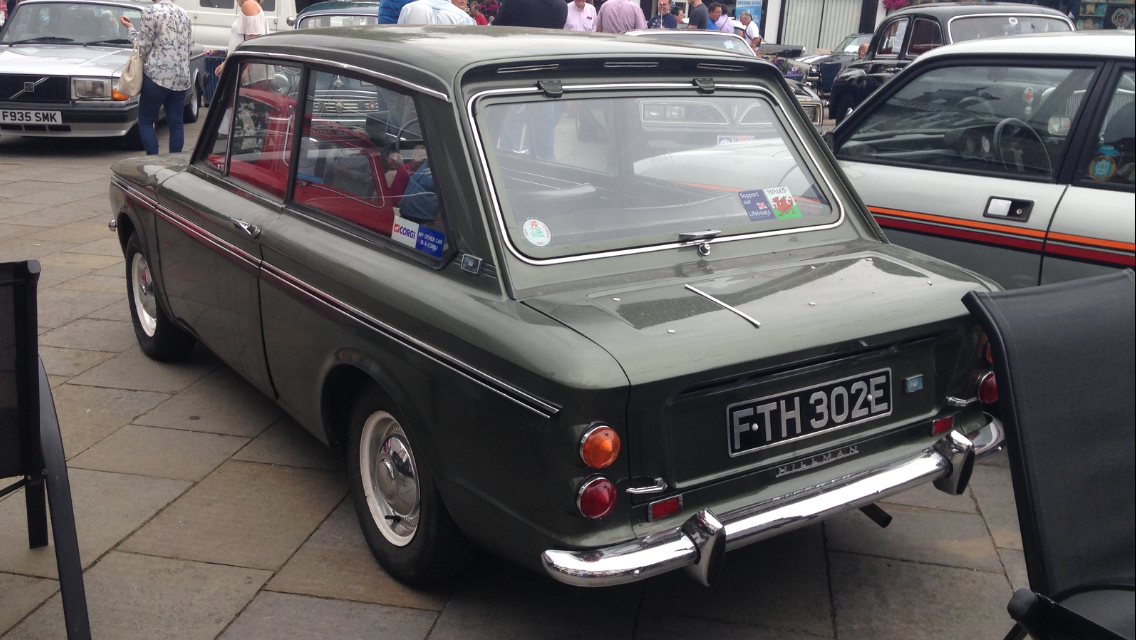
1967 Hillman Imp Super Mk II, rear view

Following the initial problems that affected the Mark I, the Rootes Group decided to re-introduce the Imp with significant changes both mechanically and cosmetically.

The Mk I Imps had a pneumatic throttle linkage and an automatic choke, both of which were replaced by more conventional items on the Mk II. The Mk II also had improved front suspension geometry, and several trim and detail changes. Although the car was constantly improved over its production life, there was no single change as significant as those in 1965. Among the changes were an added water pump, cylinder head with larger ports and valves, and 'Mark II' emblems on the side of the doors.

=== Mark III Imp: 1968–1976 ===
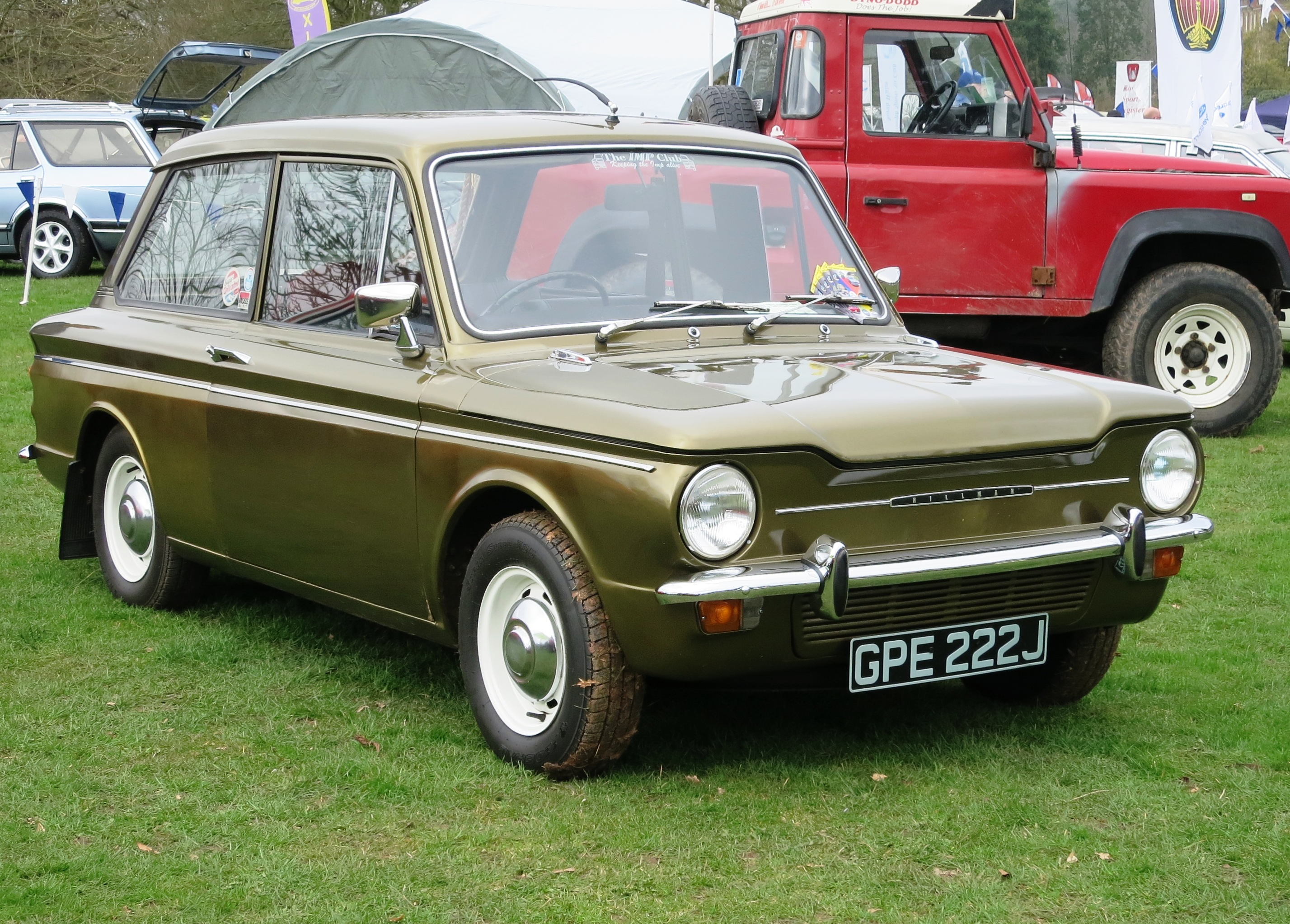
1971 Hillman Imp

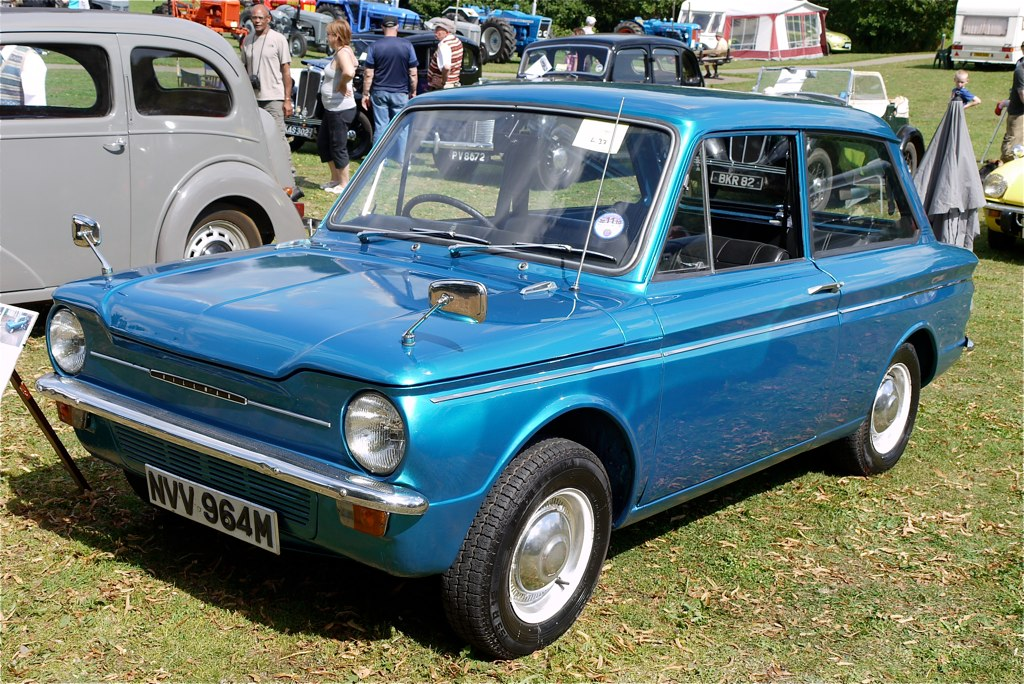
1974 Hillman Imp

1969 Sunbeam Stiletto

The Imp was never officially badged nor referred to as the "Mark III". However, changes were made to the range when the Rootes Group was fully acquired by Chrysler Europe, and so that version is sometimes referred to as the "Chrysler Imp".

After Rootes Group's acquisition by Chrysler in 1968, the entire range was revised, except for the Stiletto. The instrument panel and steering wheel were redesigned. The large speedometer previously positioned behind the steering wheel was replaced by a horizontal row of four circular dials/displays of varying detail and complexity, according to the model involved. The right-hand dial, the speedometer, was now to one side of the driver's normal sightline, while one multi-functional stalk on the right side of the steering column replaced the two control stalks that had been directly behind the steering wheel, one on each side. The earlier Imp had been praised for the good ergonomic quality of its dash-board/fascia, and its replacement reflected similar trends in other new and modified UK vehicles at a time of "production rationalization". The more modern arrangement on the Imp was seen by some as a missed opportunity.

=== Rootes, Chrysler and end of production ===
The initial problems damaged the Imp's reputation and popularity trailed off, with half of all production being from the first three years. It still sold thanks to its competitive price, distinctive styling, and cheap running costs, but sales never lived up to expectations for what had become a very competent small car. Another problem that contributed to the reputation for poor reliability was the lack of understanding of the maintenance needs of alloy engines by owners and the motor trade in the 1960s. Regular failures of the Giubo couplings also occurred. It was overshadowed in popularity by the Mini.

The company's huge investment in both the Imp and the Linwood production plant was to be a significant part of the demise of the Rootes Group. The Imp's commercial failure added to the major losses suffered by Rootes, although the main reasons for these losses were unresolved industrial unrest and the effects of the link with the Chrysler Corporation of the USA. The link was initiated by Lord (William) Rootes in 1964 as a partnership, but he died in October of that year and by 1967 the company had been acquired by Chrysler, to become part of Chrysler Europe. A year later, ahead of the 1968 London Motor Show, the recommended retail prices of most Imp models were reduced for the domestic market by more than four per cent, despite the general price inflation affecting the UK. Chrysler stewardship was blamed by some for the demise of the Imp in March 1976, after fewer than 441,000 had been built, but the entire Chrysler Europe operation was not a success and two years later it became part of Peugeot. The Imp was one of Britain's longest-running production cars with a 13-year run, despite lower sales in its later years. Its place in the Chrysler UK range was taken the following year by the Chrysler Sunbeam, a three-door hatchback based on the Avenger rear-wheel drive underpinnings. Both cars continued to be produced at the Linwood plant until it closed in 1981, after just 18 years in use.

The Ryton assembly plant continued in operation until December 2006, when production of the Peugeot 206 was switched to Slovakia.

== Design ==
Being a direct competitor to the BMC's Mini, it used a space-saving rear-engine, rear-wheel-drive layout to allow as much luggage and passenger capacity as possible in both the rear and the front of the car. It used a unique opening rear hatch to allow luggage to be put into the back seat rest.

It was the first mass-produced British car with a rear engine and the first to use a diaphragm spring clutch. The baulk-ring synchromesh unit for the transaxle compensated for the speeds of gear and shaft before engagement, from which the Mini had suffered during its early production years.

It incorporated many design features which were uncommon. Among them were a folding rear bench seat, automatic choke which was rare on compact cars outside the United States until the 1970s, and gauges for temperature, voltage and oil pressure which have been largely omitted since the 1950s in favour of emergency lights.

The engine proved flexible and very easy to tune. It was an overhead camshaft design, which permitted better air flow than a standard OHV engine. As with all engine heads, it could also be flowed and ported to allow better airflow at high engine speeds. Useful improvements in power could be gained by replacing the standard silencer (muffler) with one that allowed better exhaust gas flow and adding better carburettors. However, in adapting the design to suit modern mass-production methods, Rootes had left the engine more fragile than the Coventry Climax model from which it had been derived.

The Imp used a derivative of the Climax FWMA engine whereas the Lotus cars used an FWMC engine which had an entirely different cylinder head.

== Marketing ==
Initially, the Imp was seen by Rootes as a potential second car for families with the means to acquire one. In this incarnation, it was a somewhat revolutionary, high-quality small car, with some above average features. Later the concept evolved into a kind of ultra-economy car with some cheaply and poorly executed, design features as a utilitarian vehicle, like some of the Eastern European marques of the time like Škoda, and later Lada, which were relatively low-cost economy cars, popular with British consumers. At one point the basic Hillman Imp was the cheapest new car on the British market, which increased low sales figures for a time.

== Variants and "badge engineering" ==
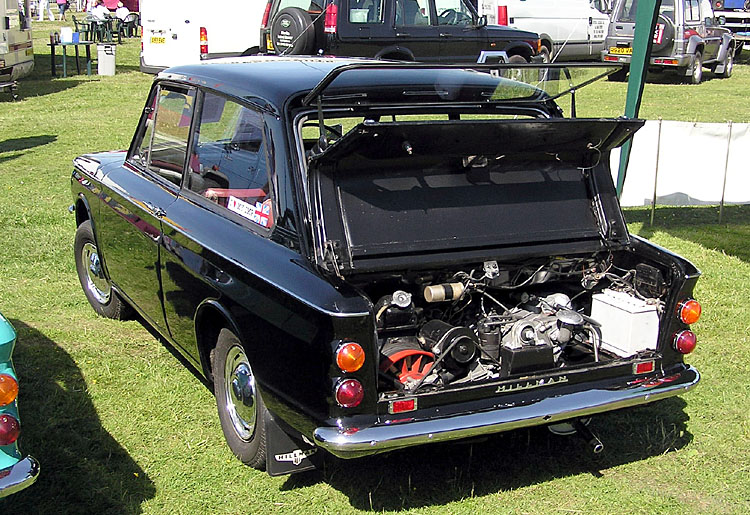
Hillman Imp, with the engine cover and the rear window lifted

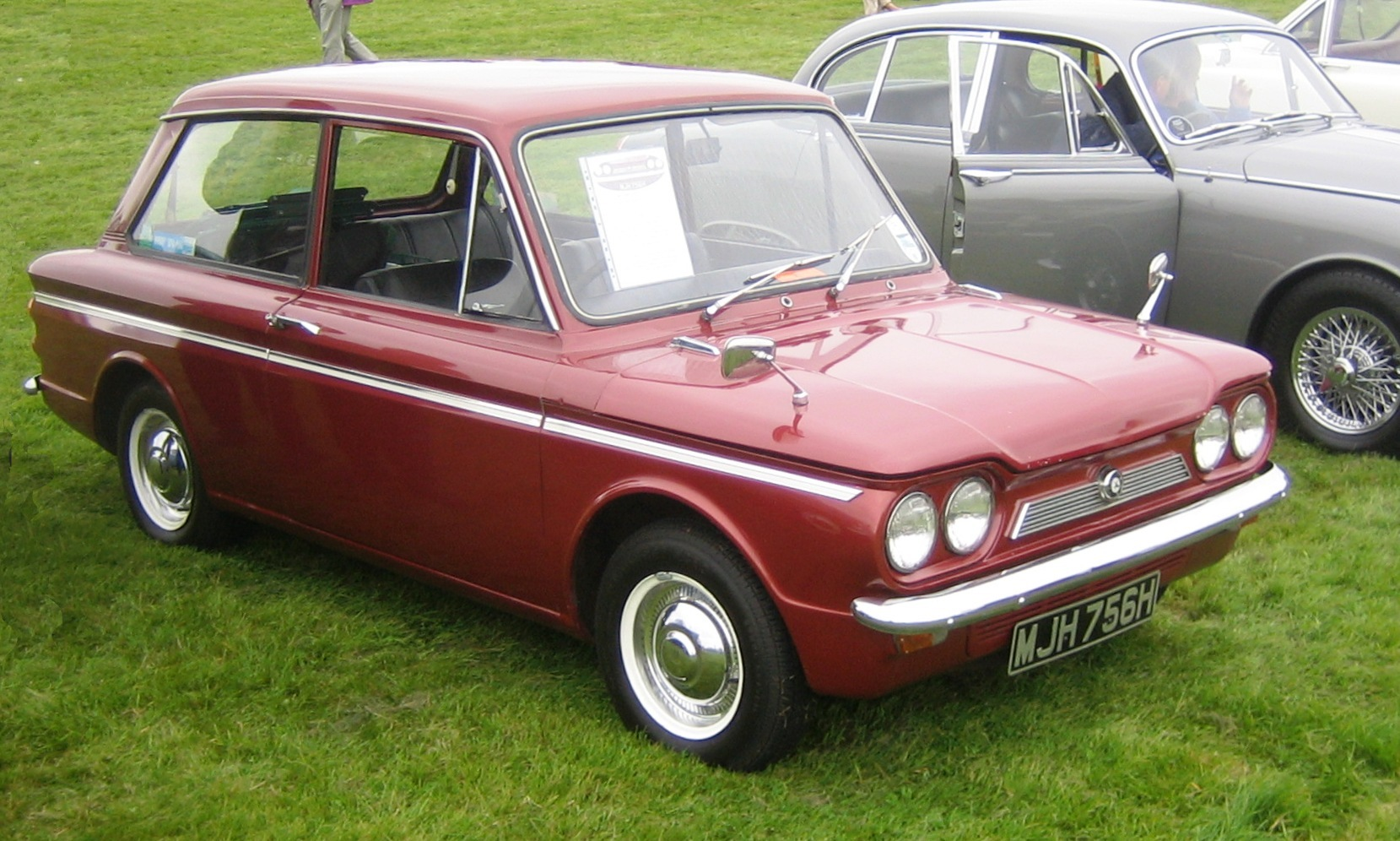
The Singer Chamois version sold at a premium: additional features included a distinctive false grille and, from October 1969, twin headlights.

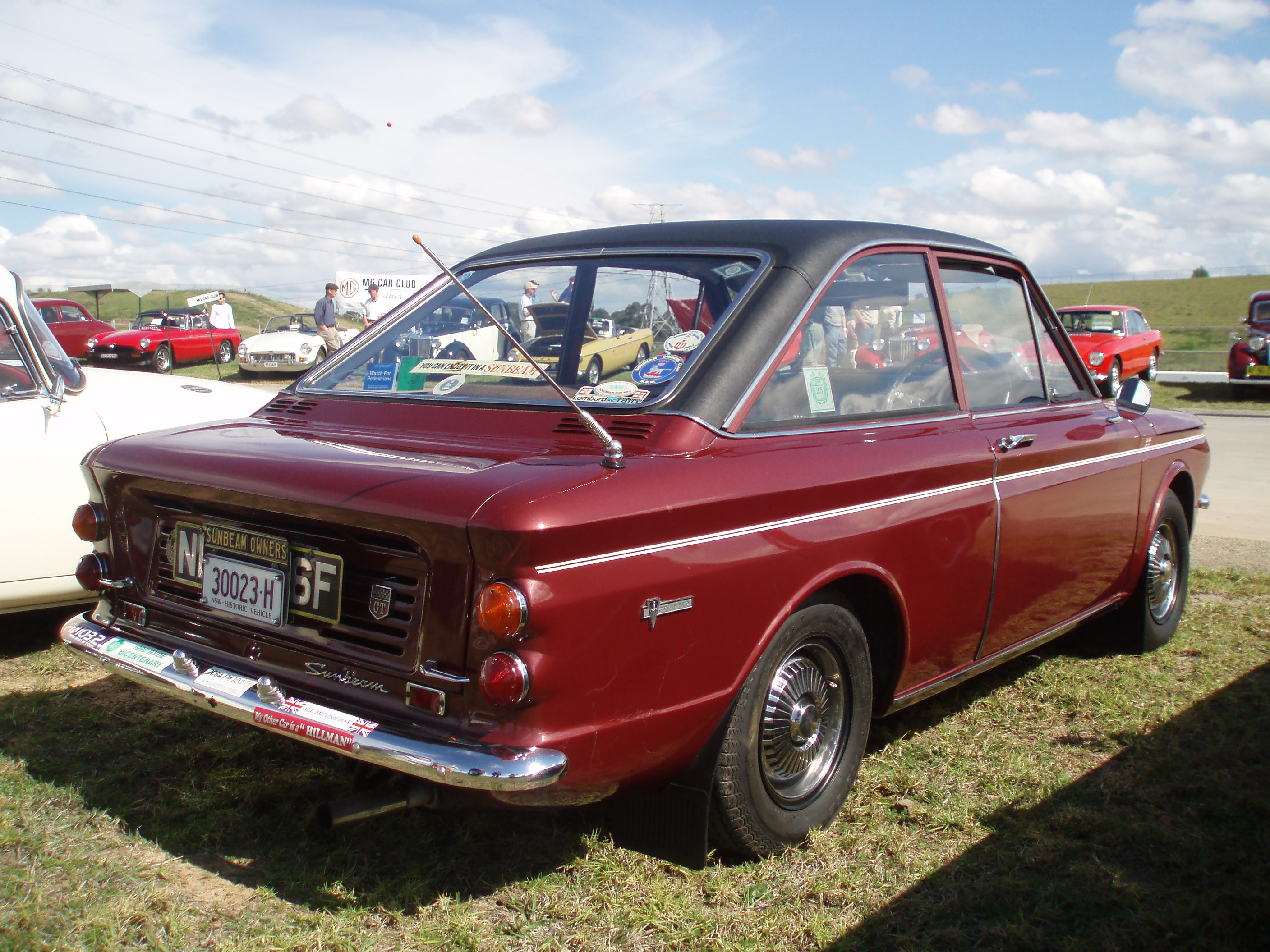
'Coupe' variants, marketed as the Hillman Imp Californian, the Sunbeam Stiletto (pictured above) and the Singer Chamois Coupé, featured a more steeply raked rear window which could not be opened.

Over the life of the car, Rootes (and later Chrysler UK) produced four body styles. The original saloon was introduced in May 1963 and ran through to the end of production in 1976. It has an opening rear window, making it effectively a hatchback. The opening rear window is intended to make it easier to load the small luggage area behind the fold-down rear seat. The fold-down nature of the rear seat was itself unusual in small car design at the time, being more often associated with larger upmarket estate cars. In 1965 a van badged as the "Commer Imp" was introduced. A coupe, the Imp Californian, was introduced in 1967 at the same time as the van's pressings were used to create an estate car, badged "Hillman Husky". Several estate car prototypes using the saloon body with extended rooflines were tried, but never offered to the public. Instead, buyers choosing the estate had to settle for a van-derived car with somewhat unusual styling. Both the van and estate ceased production in 1970.

In an attempt to interest a wider public when sales figures fell well short of the intended 100,000 cars per annum, several badge-engineered derivatives, such as the luxury Singer Chamois (launched October 1964), and the Sunbeam Sport (launched October 1966), with a more powerful twin-carburettor engine, were offered with varying degrees of success. For marketing reasons the Singer variants were sold as Sunbeams in many export markets, even before May 1970 when the Singer marque was discontinued altogether by Chrysler UK. In some markets, such as France, the "Sunbeam" name was used on all British Rootes products, including the Imp and the Husky.

The coupe bodyshell is similar to the standard body but features a more shallow-raked windscreen and rear window which, unlike that on the standard bodied cars, can not be opened. The attempt at a more sporty design did not translate into better acceleration or top speed figures and the aerodynamics of the standard saloon are actually slightly better. The new body style made its first appearance at the Paris Motor Show in October 1967, with the introduction of the sporting Sunbeam Stiletto. The coupe body had also appeared, with less powerful engines, in the Hillman Imp Californian announced in January 1967 and the more luxurious Singer Chamois coupe.

== Manufacture ==
The Imp was a massive and expensive leap of faith for Rootes. The company did not have recent experience building small cars, even though it started off as a car builder by offering the then small Hillman Minx back in 1931. However, the Minx had since grown larger and was well established as a medium-size family car by the time the Imp was introduced. For the Imp, Rootes pioneered the use of an aluminium engine in a mass-production car. This process proved to be more complicated than simply substituting an aluminium design for a familiar and well-understood cast-iron design. Rootes had to build a new, computerised assembly plant on the outskirts of Paisley, in Linwood, in which to assemble the Imp. The UK Government Regional Assistance policy provided financial grants to the Rootes Group to bring approximately 6,000 jobs to the area. Linwood had become an area of significant unemployment because of redundancies in the declining shipbuilding industry on the nearby River Clyde. The investment also included an advanced die-casting plant to manufacture the aluminium engine casings, and a stake in a brand new Pressed Steel Company motor pressings works, which manufactured all the new car's body panels. The location of the plant led to significant logistical issues for the manufacturing process. Linwood was over 300 miles (480 km) away from Rootes' main factory at Ryton-on-Dunsmore, but the engine castings made in Linwood had to be sent to Ryton to be machined and assembled, then sent back up to be put on the cars — a 600-mile (970 km) round trip. This was addressed by a complex schedule of trains shifting completed cars and raw castings south, and trains loaded with engine- gearbox assemblies and many other Ryton-sourced goods running north. To aid with balancing the logistical costs of this operation, body pressings for the Hillman Avenger were also made at Linwood, but transported south to Ryton on the component trains. This schedule remained in operation for the duration of Linwood Imp production.

The local West of Scotland workforce, recruited mainly from the shipbuilding industry, did not bring the distinct skills necessary for motor vehicle assembly, and Imp build quality and reliability suffered accordingly. However, industrial relations were also an issue in production. Industrial disputes and strike action became a regular occurrence, as was the case in many parts of British industry in the 1960s and 1970s.

Approximately half a million were produced, half of this number coming in the first three years of production.

== Overseas assembly ==
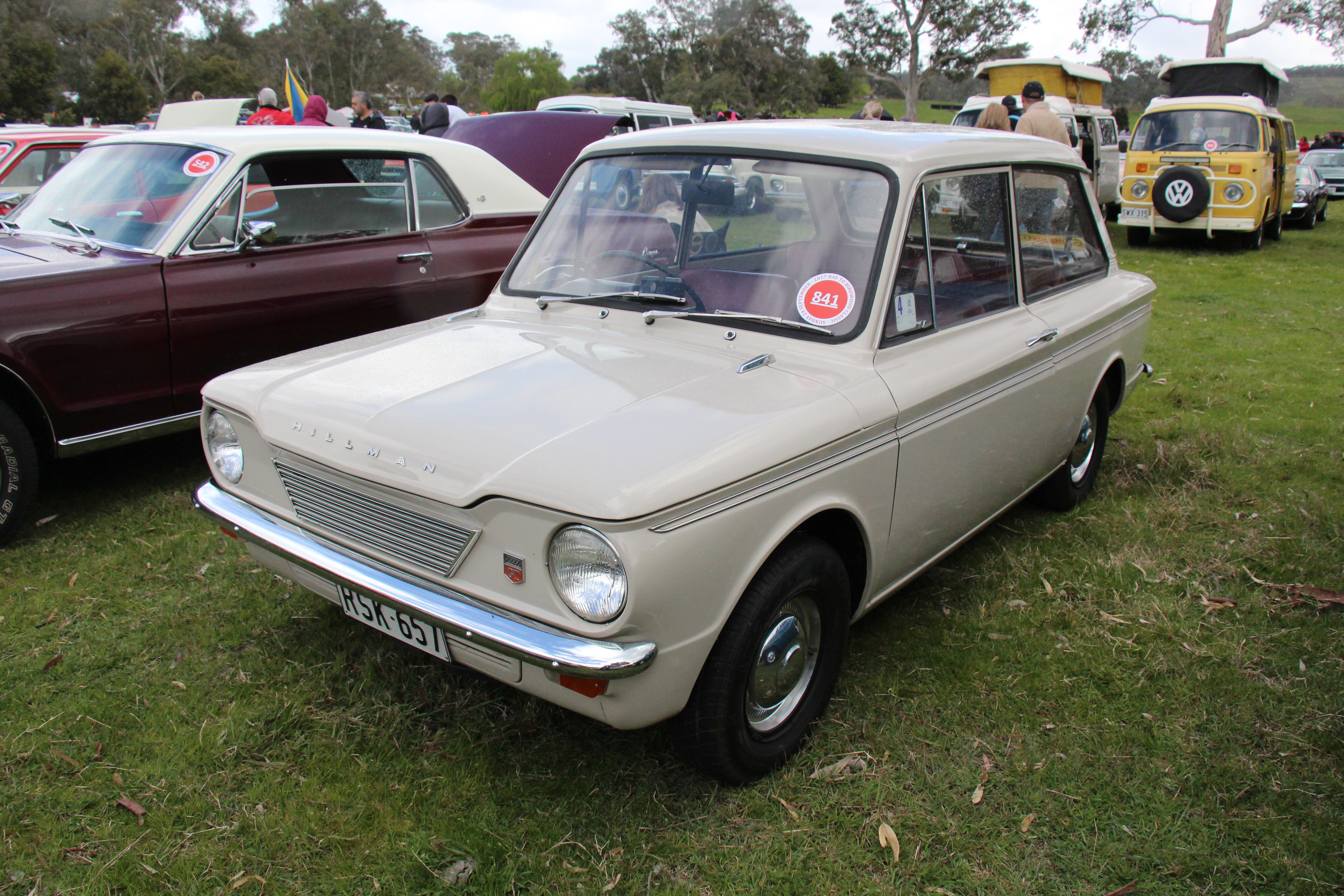
Hillman GT, a variant built by Chrysler Australia

Unassembled cars were exported for assembly in Australia, Costa Rica, Ireland, Malaysia, Malta, New Zealand, Philippines, Portugal, South Africa, Uruguay, and Venezuela. New Zealand cars were assembled as Hillmans by Chrysler/Hillman importer Todd Motors for several years from about 1964. The model returned, this time as a four-headlamp Sunbeam with the newer dashboard. Production of the Imp stopped in 1970 because Todd Motors required the Imp assembly line to build the Hillman Avenger. Todd Motors only had two final assembly lines at Petone, so the Avenger and the Hunter shared one line and the larger Chrysler Valiant was built on the other.

Imps were assembled by Rootes Australia in their Port Melbourne factory from 1964. The following models were produced:

- PM Imp: Available in Standard trim only. Produced from 1964 to 1965. Built from UK Mk I Imp CKD kits. In 1965 a Super Imp was released (refer to photo of white car with red flash above) and featured improvements due to the issues with the Mk1 and these were to carry over to the IMP II.
- PA Imp: Badged as "IMP II". Available in Standard or Super trim. Sold from February 1966– March 1968, it was still based on UK Mk I CKD kits.
- PB Imp: Badged as "IMP III". Also available in Standard or Super trim. Produced from 1968 to around 1970. Further improvements made over the PA Imp, early cars were still based on UK Mk I CKD kits, but as these were depleted, UK Mk II CKD kits were used. The very last batch of IMP IIIs may have used the CKD Imp Sport body shell only. Later IMP IIIs also used the UK Mk II engine.
- Hillman GT: built from Sunbeam Imp Sport CKD kits. Produced from 1967 to the end of 1968.
- Hillman Sonic/Stiletto: convertible model produced for Chrysler Australia by Eiffel Tower Motors of Dandenong.

== Variants ==
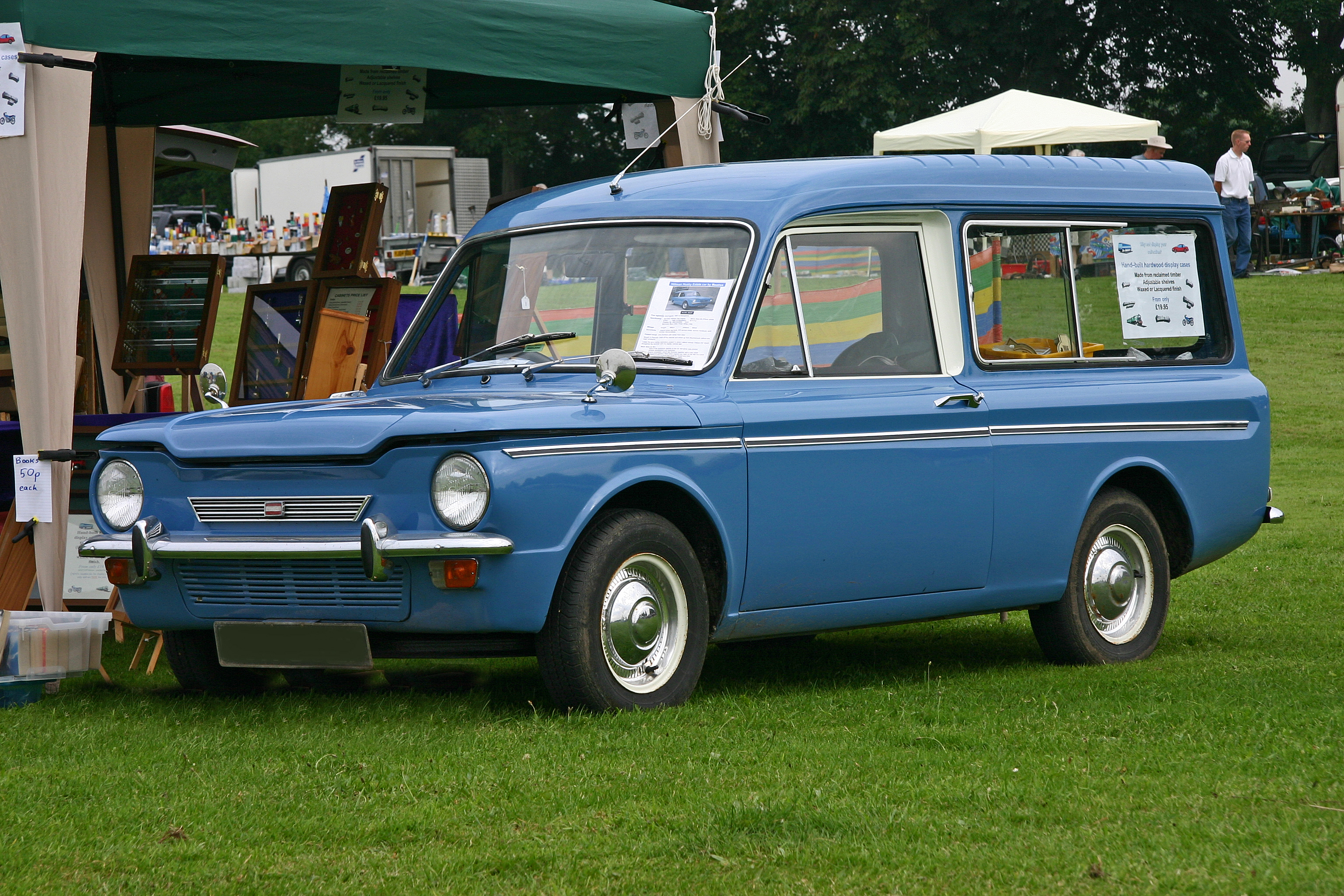
The Hillman Husky name was resurrected in 1967 for an Imp-based estate car.

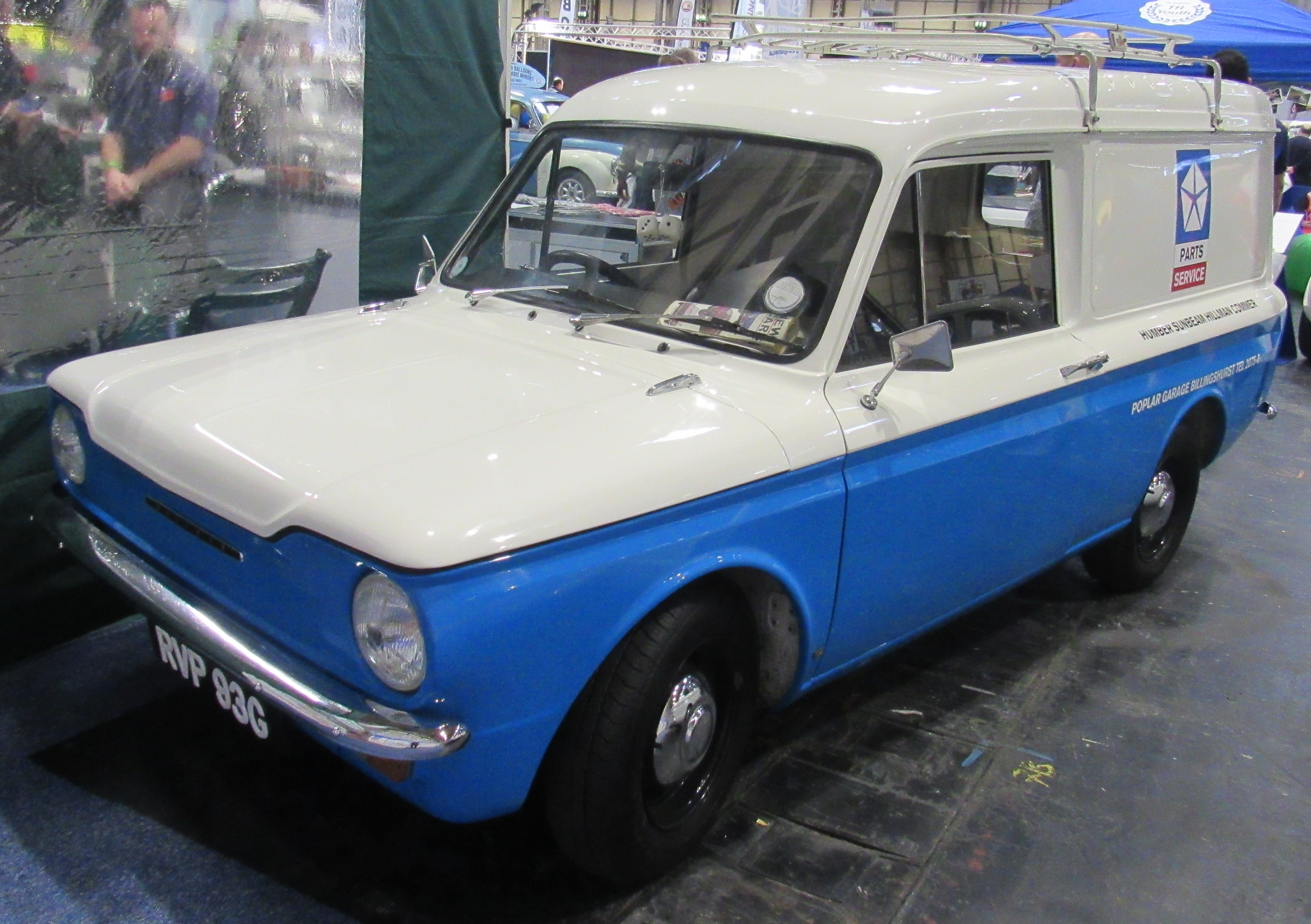
1969 Hillman Imp Van

- Hillman Imp Mark I (1963–1965)
- Hillman Imp de Luxe Mark I and Mark II (1963–68)
- Hillman Super Imp (1965–1974)
- Hillman Imp (1968–1976)
- Hillman GT (1967–?) developed by Chrysler Australia from the Singer Chamois Sport, it was never badged nor officially referred to as the "Hillman Imp GT"
- Hillman Imp Californian (1967–1970) coupé and fastback saloon versions
- Hillman Husky (1967–1970) estate version of the Imp
- Commer Imp Van (1965–1968)
- Hillman Imp Van (1968–1970)
- Hillman Imp Caledonian (1975-1976 limited-edition model of around 2,000 cars in Cherry Red paint with additional accessories and available in Super and De luxe models)
- Singer Chamois Mark I, Mark II, (1964–1970)
- Singer Chamois Rallye (1965–68?) (rally conversion with unique instrument panel, luxury features and increased engine size of 998cc)
- Singer Chamois Sport, and Coupé (1967–1970)
- Sunbeam Imp Sport (1966–1970)
- Sunbeam Sport (1970–1976)
- Sunbeam Chamois (export markets outside of UK only)
- Sunbeam Stiletto (1967–1972)
- Sunbeam Californian
- Sunbeam Imp Basic (North America)
- Sunbeam Imp De Luxe Mark I and Mark II (North America)

== Cars using Imp mechanicals ==
- Beach Mk4
- Bond 875 & variants
- BS Nymph
- Clan Crusader
- Concept Centaur GT
- Davrian
- Ginetta Cars G15
- Siva Llama

== Motorsport ==
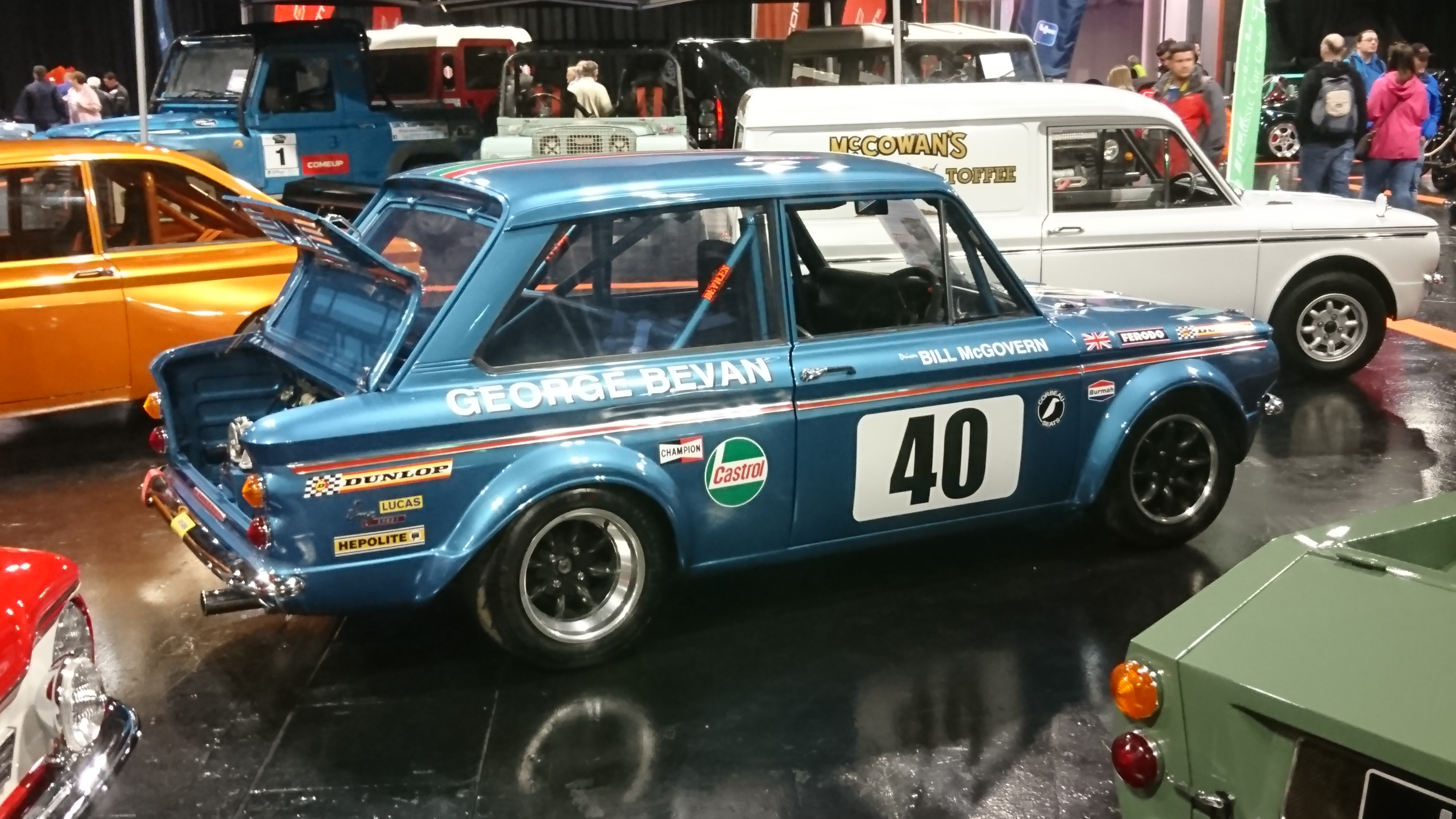
The Hillman/Sunbeam Imp with which Bill McGovern won three consecutive British Saloon Car Championships between 1970 and 1972

Between August 12 and 14, 1964, the Sunbeam Imp sports sedan (ZT-86-20) American Rodding Magazine official test car sanctioned a US-coast-to-coast endurance run and broke a "world record" in the process, previously set at 53.5 hours by Erwin George “Cannonball” Baker three decades earlier in 1933, driving from New York City, to Los Angeles, California, covering 3,011 mi (4,846 km) on new Interstate Highways in 48 hours, 9 minutes, 54 seconds at an average speed of 63.7 mph (102.5 km/h).

The Imp gained a reputation as a successful rally car when Rosemary Smith won the Tulip Rally in 1965. That led the Rootes Group to produce a special rally conversion of the Imp under both the Hillman and Singer marques, known as the Imp Rallye. In 1966, after winning the Coupe des Dames, Smith was disqualified under a controversial ruling regarding the headlamps of her Imp. The Imp was also successful in touring car racing when Bill McGovern won the British Saloon Car Championship in 1970, 1971 and 1972.

In UK club racing the Imp variants became successful in the under 1000 cc Special Saloon category. Notable exponents of the Imp in racing include Ian Forrest, Harry Simpson, Ricky Gauld, John Homewood, Roger Nathan, Gerry Birrell, Ray Payne and Chris Barter.

The Imp was also successfully raced and rallied in other parts of the world, notably Asia, where drivers including Andrew Bryson and Pardaman Singh regularly won saloon car categories into the 1980s.

The 998 cc Imp engine was also used in three-wheeled racing sidecars in the 1970s and 1980s. Exhaust systems were naturally constructed on a one-off basis. The engines often sporting the Twin Weber twin-choke setup. A number of sidecar crews raced Imp-equipped outfits at the Isle of Man TT races, best placement being Roy Hanks in eleventh place in the 1976 TT 1000 cc Sidecar. Imp-engined outfits are still regularly championed in classic racing.

Andy Chesman won the 1972 World Hydroplane championship using an Imp engine. He bought Imp specialist company Greetham Engineering and designed a wedge head to increase the 998 cc engine to 125 bhp with twin 40DCOE Weber carburetors. He also fitted a spacer on top of the wet block to accommodate longer cylinder liners, increasing capacity to 1220 cc. At the BP-sponsored Windermere records week in October 1972, he raised the R1 Class water speed record to 89 miles per hour (143 km/h). He was killed in 1998 in a power-boat accident, still holding the record.
