= BS Nymph =

Nymph

Overview
- Manufacturer: Bohanna Stables
- Production: 1975-1977; 42 produced High Wycombe, Buckinghamshire, UK

Body and chassis
- Class: Kit car
- Body style: buggy
- Layout: RR layout

Powertrain
- Engine: 875 cc SOHC I4 (Hillman Imp)

Dimensions
- Wheelbase: 82.25 in (2,089 mm)
- Curb weight: 420 kg (926 lb)

The BS Nymph was a fibreglass monocoque British buggy based on running gear from the Hillman Imp, including its rear-mounted 875 cc engine. While meant by Chrysler UK to enter series production to the tune of 4000 cars per annum, the Chrysler corporation discontinued the Imp before the Nymph was released. Rather than competing globally with the Mini Moke as intended, the Nymph entered small-scale production as a kit car and only 42 cars were finished. The designers, Peter Bohanna and Robin Stables, are perhaps best known for having designed the "Diablo GT", which later was developed into the AC 3000ME.

== Design ==
The Nymph used almost all of the Imp parts aside from the body, with most of the hardware bolted directly to its GRP monocoque. This body was moulded in colour and also fire-retardant. At the time of introduction, a construction time of 50-60 hours were claimed. Doors and a hardtop, as well as a "Surrey"-style softtop, were available as options. By 1977, production had ended as Bohanna and Stables had moved on to other projects and given up on manufacturing.

== See also ==
- Hillman Imp
- Mini Moke
