= Patrick Rylands =

English toy designer (1942–2025)

Patrick Rylands (12 September 1942 – 11 December 2025) was an English toy designer from Hull.

== Life and career ==
Rylands was born in Hull, East Yorkshire, on 12 September 1942. After graduating in ceramics from the Royal College of Art in London in 1966, Rylands began to work as a freelancer with a number of toy companies (Creative Playthings, Naef, Ambi Toys).

In 1970, he became the youngest designer to be awarded the Prince Philip Designers Prize for a group of ABS plastic toys designed for the British company Trendon Toys (former producer of Sasha dolls). From 1976 up until 2002, he worked as in-house designer for the historic Dutch toy company, Ambi Toys. In 1999, he was awarded the title of Royal Designer for Industry.

His toy designs are part of the permanent collection at the Victoria and Albert Museum of Childhood in London and have been exhibited in the Olympic Games of London 2012.

Rylands died after a short battle with vascular dementia in Royal Leamington Spa, on 11 December 2025, at the age of 83.
