= Concept Centaur GT =

The Concept Centaur GT was a kit car first built by Concept Cars Ltd of Middleton, Leicestershire, in 1973 and marketed from 1974 to 1977. The design was very much influenced by the Probe 15 from Adams Probe Motor. The car is famous for possibly being the lowest car ever made being only 94 cm (37 in) high. It was based on the Hillman Imp mechanicals and the body was a GRP-and-plywood monocoque with box section and steel tube reinforcement. The number of models produced is disputed, both 26 and 52 cars have been quoted.

In 1978 a new 2+2 version was developed, but the project was passed on to Mirage Developments a separate kitcar manufacturer from Kent who produced and sold it briefly as the Mirage Pulsar kitcar.

The Durango 95 in the 1971 film A Clockwork Orange was probably a Probe 16. Only three of these were made. All three are still in existence, including the car used in Clockwork Orange. Dennis Adams has recently revealed in an interview that he had sold the car used in the Clockwork Orange in 1971 to fund his move to the United States.

== See also ==
- List of car manufacturers of the United Kingdom
