= Hillman Husky =

Hillman Husky (Minx based)
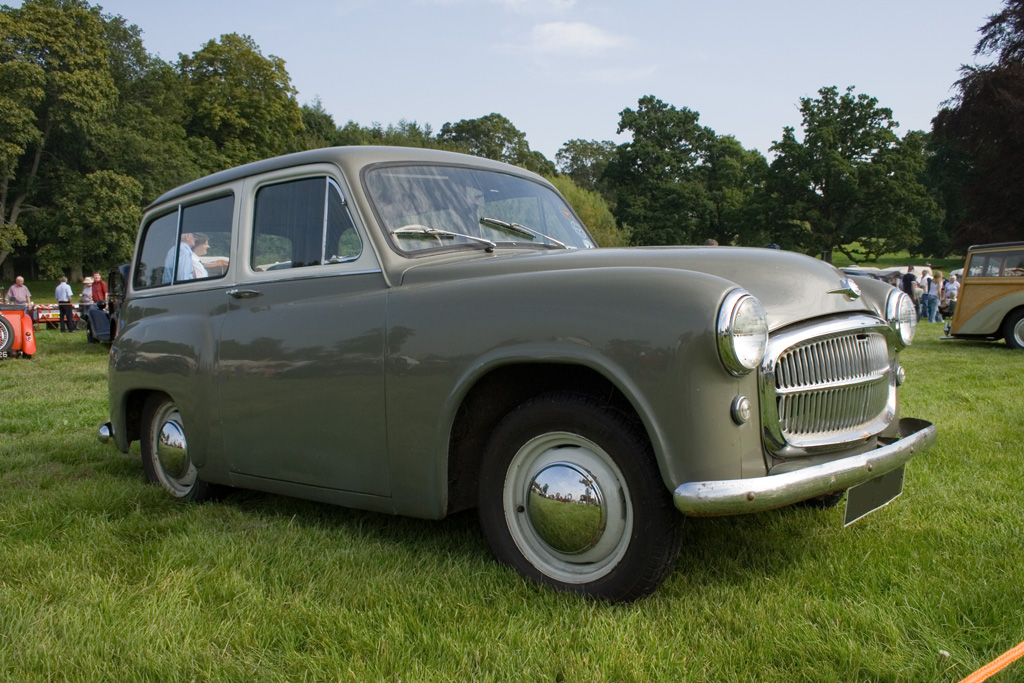

Overview
- Manufacturer: Hillman (Rootes Group)
- Production: 1954–1957

Body and chassis
- Body style: three-door estate
- Related: Hillman Minx; Commer Cob

Powertrain
- Engine: 1,265 cc (77.2 cu in) straight-4
- Transmission: 4-speed manual

Dimensions
- Wheelbase: 84 in (2,134 mm)
- Length: 148 in (3,759 mm)
- Width: 63.25 in (1,607 mm)
- Height: 61 in (1,549 mm)
- Curb weight: 1,904 lb (864 kg)

Chronology
- Successor: Hillman Husky (Audax based)

The Hillman Husky was a line of British passenger vehicles manufactured between 1954 and 1970 by Hillman.

== Original Hillman Husky ("Mark 1") ==
The first (or "Mark 1") Hillman Husky, introduced in 1954, was a small estate car based on the contemporary "Mark VIII" Hillman Minx. The two-door Husky entered the range alongside an existing Minx estate car, which had a 9-inch (230 mm) longer wheelbase. The Husky was not a hatchback, having instead a single side-hinged rear door. While the new Mark VIII Minx DeLuxe saloon, convertible and "Californian" hardtop used a new OHV 1,390 cc (85 cu in) engine, the Husky continued to use the older 1,265 cc (77.2 cu in) 35 bhp (26 kW) sidevalve engine with single Zenith carburettor which it shared with the Minx "Special" saloon and estate. Unlike the Minx with its column change, the gear lever for the Husky was floor-mounted.

There were individual seats in front and a bench seat in the rear which would fold flat to increase the load area. The trim material was leathercloth. Both the heater and radio were optional extras. The car was available in blue, grey, green or sand paint (1954 colours).

42,000 of this Husky were sold until the model was replaced in 1958 (a year after the "parent" Minx was itself replaced).

The Motor magazine tested a Husky in 1954 and found it to have a top speed of 65 mph (105 km/h) and acceleration from 0-50 mph (80 km/h) in 24.3 seconds. A fuel consumption of 33.4 miles per imperial gallon (8.5 L/100 km; 27.8 mpg_{‑US}) was recorded. The test car cost £564 including taxes.

== "Audax Series" Hillman Husky ==
Hillman Husky (Minx "Audax" based)
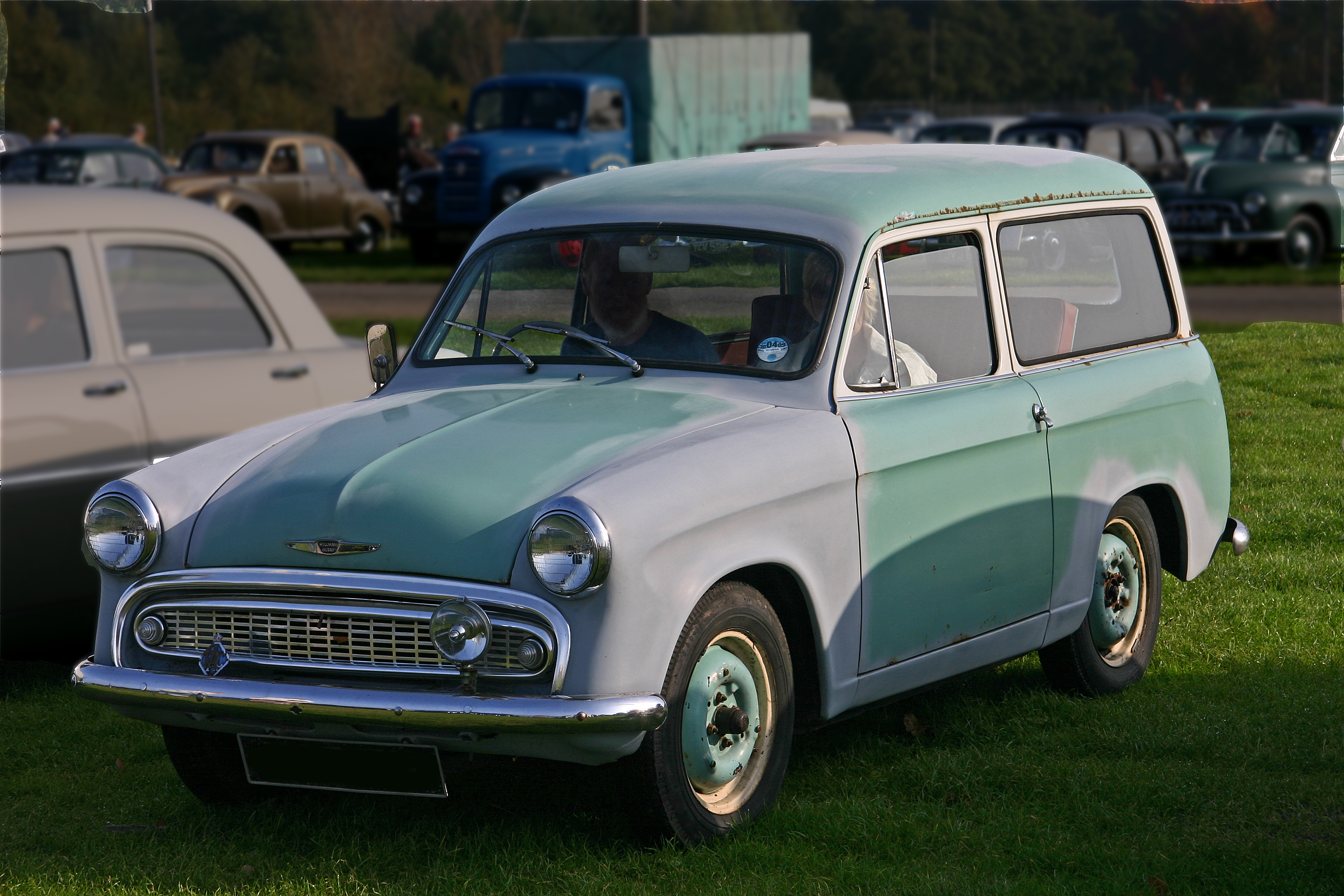
- Hillman Husky Series I

Overview
- Manufacturer: Hillman (Rootes Group)
- Production: 1958–1965

Body and chassis
- Body style: Three-door estate
- Related: Hillman Minx; Commer Cob

Powertrain
- Engine: 1,390 cc (85 cu in) straight-4

Dimensions
- Wheelbase: 86 in (2,184 mm)49 in (1,245 mm)
- Length: 149.5 in (3,797 mm)
- Width: 60.5 in (1,537 mm)
- Height: 60 in (1,524 mm)
- Curb weight: 2,072 lb (940 kg) (Ser I & III) (2,100 lb (953 kg) (Ser II)

Chronology
- Predecessor: Hillman Husky (Minx based)
- Successor: Hillman Husky (Imp based)

=== Series I ===
In 1958 the new "Series I" Husky was introduced. It followed the same formula as its predecessor, but was based on the new "Audax" or "Series" Hillman Minx. This time the engine was the new Minx's 1390 cc overhead-valve unit but de-rated to an output of 51 hp (38 kW; 52 PS). As before, there was also a four-door "Minx estate", and the Husky had two doors (plus the side-hinged rear door) and a shorter wheelbase (by 8 inches [200 mm]). It was, however, 2 inches (51 mm) longer than its predecessor.

Again Commer sold a panel van version of the same vehicle as the Commer Cob.

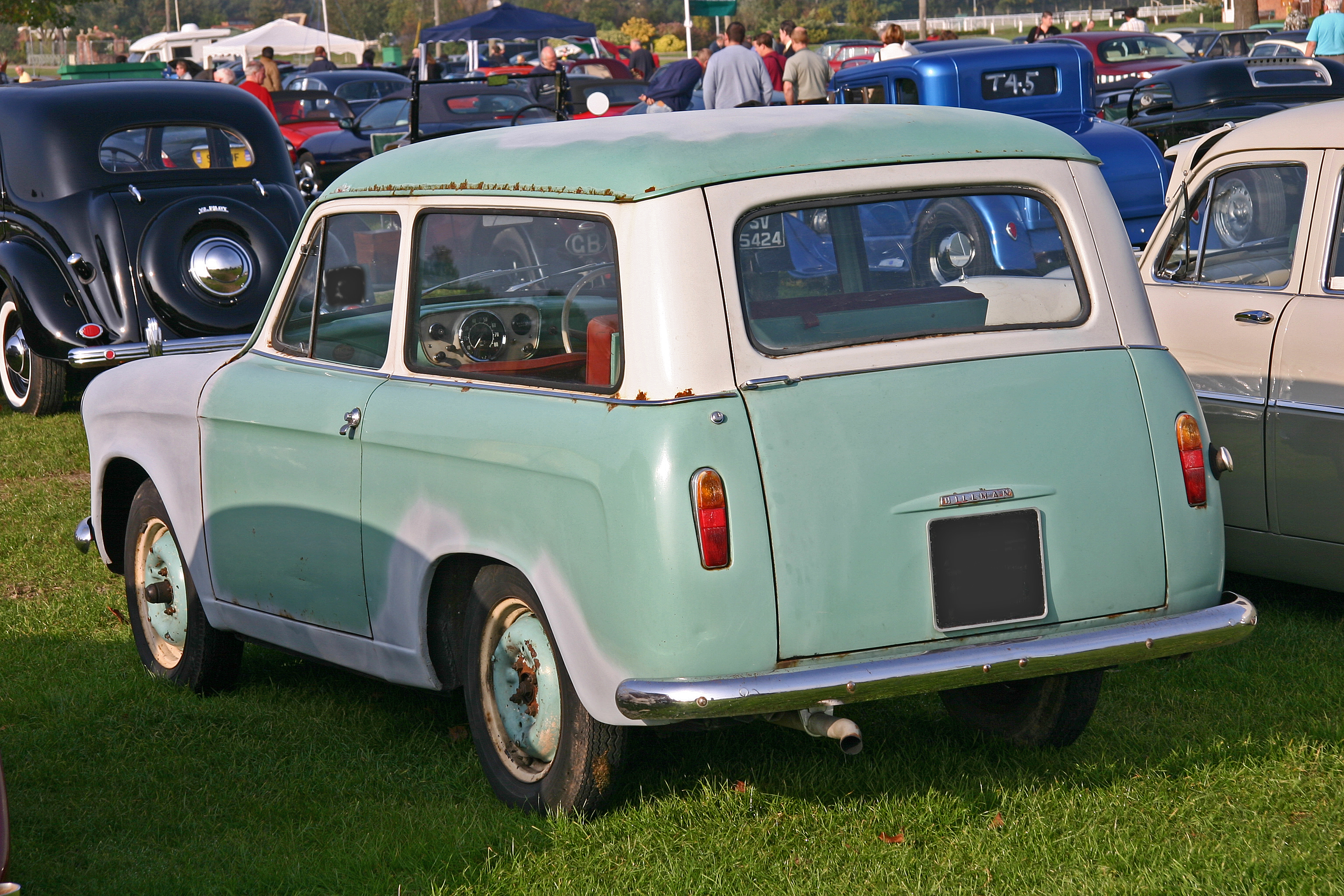
side-opening rear door

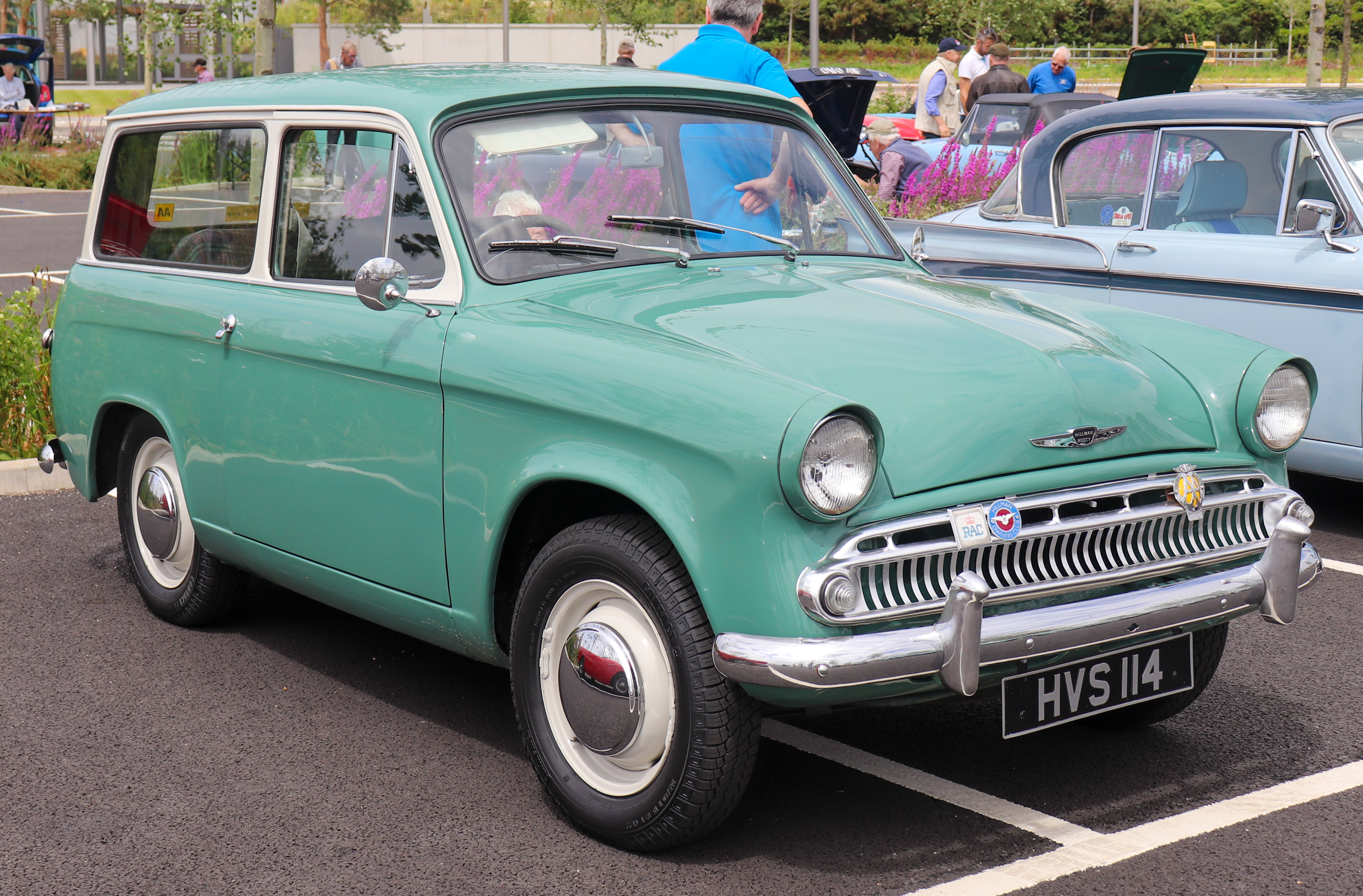
Hillman Husky Series II

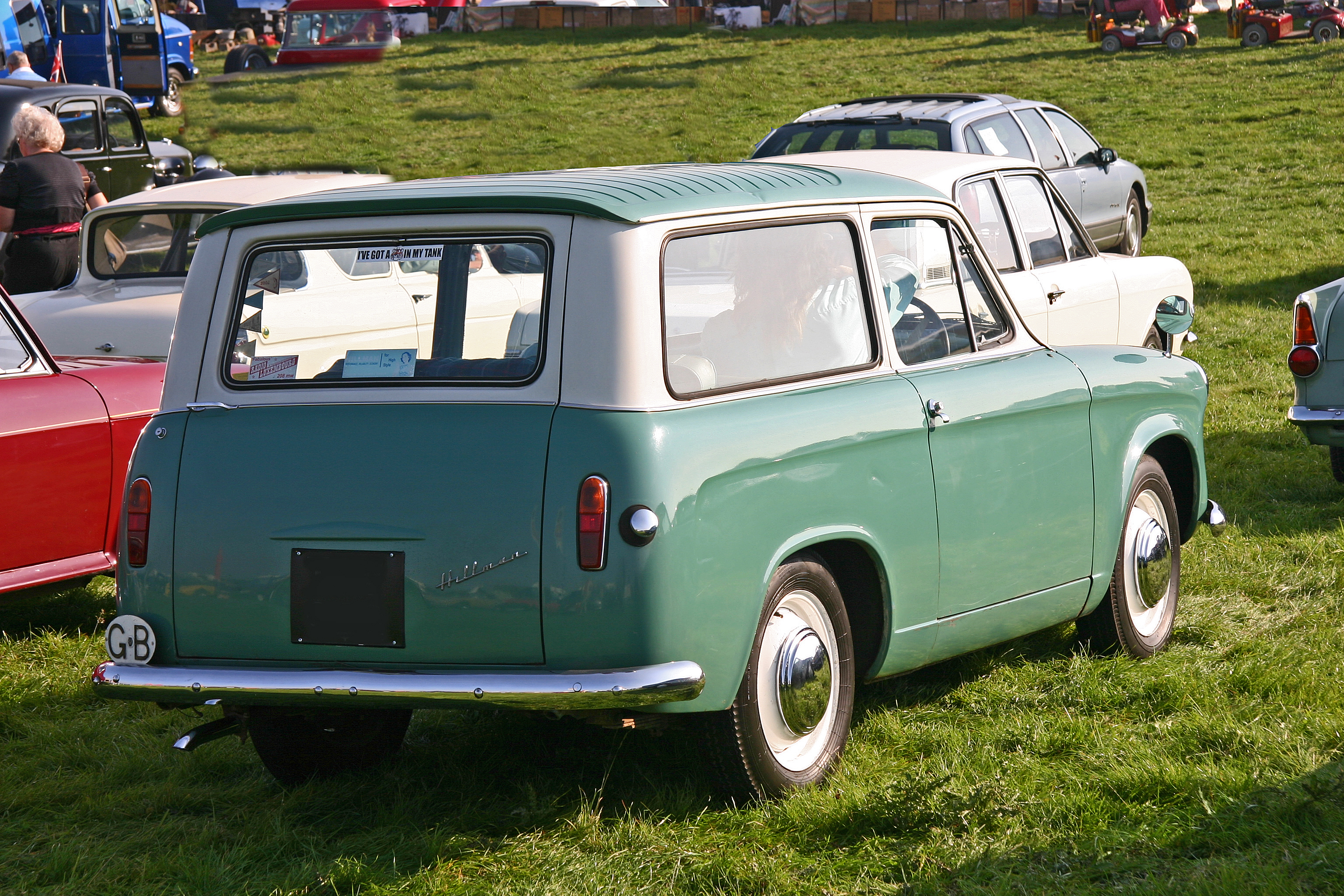
Series II rear

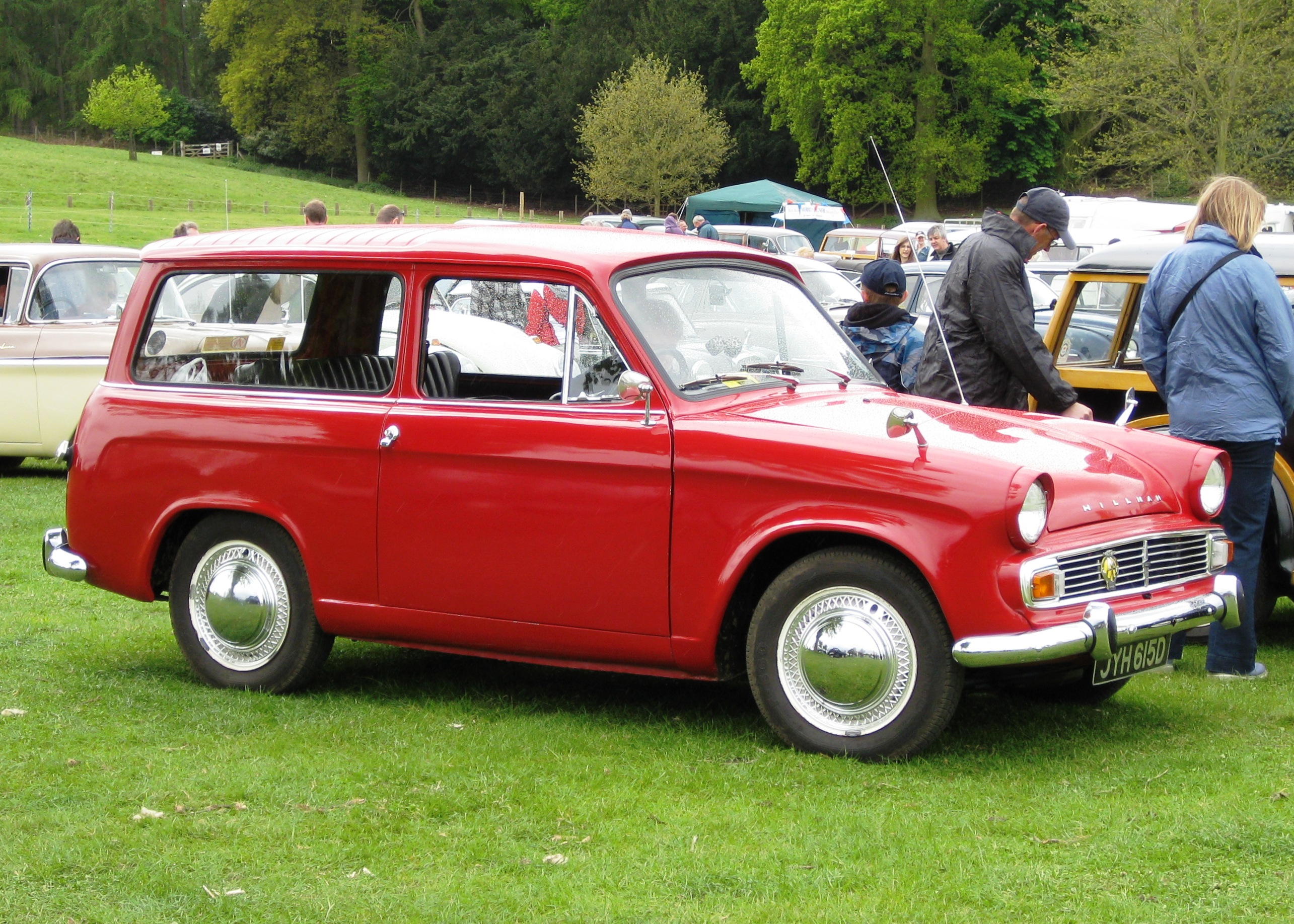
Series III

=== Series II ===
A "Series II" Husky followed in 1960 with a four-speed gearbox, slightly lowered roof, a deeper windscreen, and altered seats. The engine compression ratio was raised to 8:1 and the carburettor changed to a Zenith 30 VIG type.

Testing the Husky in 1960, The Motor magazine recorded a top speed of 73.4 mph (118.1 km/h), acceleration from 0-60 mph (97 km/h) of 26.9 seconds and a fuel consumption of 30.8 miles per imperial gallon (9.2 L/100 km; 25.6 mpg_{‑US}). The test car cost £674 including taxes.

=== Series III ===
The final iteration of the "Audax" Hillman Husky, the "Series III", made its debut in 1963, along with a facelift for the whole Minx range (and its badge-engineered derivatives). The facelift bodywork changes were applied to the Husky, but the reduction in wheel size from 15-inch (380 mm) to 13-inch (330 mm), which was applied to the saloons, was not applied to the Husky in order to maintain its ground clearance. In addition, whilst the contemporary Series V Minx got front disc brakes, the Husky continued with four-wheel drum brakes. While the 1390 cc engine continued to be used in most markets, for the USA the Husky adopted the 1,592 cc (97.1 cu in) engine used in the contemporary Minx Series V.

From 1964 the Husky gained an all-synchromesh gearbox and changes to the clutch and suspension. Production of the Series III ended in 1965.

== Hillman Imp van derivative ==
Hillman Husky (Imp based)
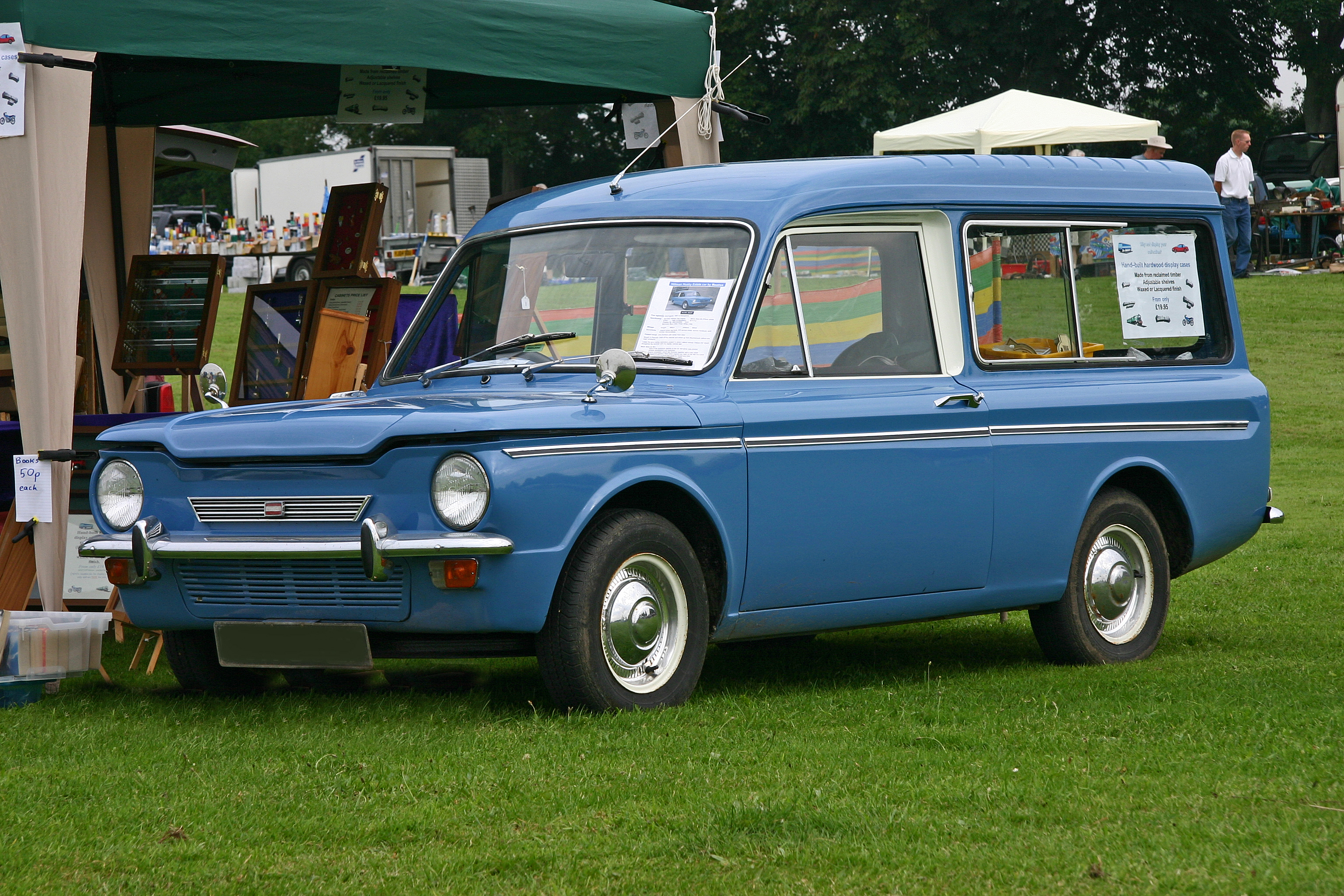
- Hillman Husky (1967-1970)

Overview
- Manufacturer: Hillman (Rootes Group)
- Production: 1967–1970

Body and chassis
- Body style: three-door estate
- Related: Hillman Imp; Commer Imp Van

Powertrain
- Engine: 875 cc (53.4 cu in) straight-4
- Transmission: 4-speed manual all-synchromesh

Dimensions
- Wheelbase: 82 in (2,083 mm)49 in (1,245 mm)
- Length: 141 in (3,581 mm)
- Width: 60.25 in (1,530 mm)
- Height: 58 in (1,473 mm)
- Curb weight: 1,652 lb (749 kg)

Chronology
- Predecessor: Hillman Husky
- Successor: None

No further Huskies were made until a new model based on the Hillman Imp appeared in April 1967. This new Husky shared the Imp's rear-mounted 875 cc (53.4 cu in) overhead camshaft engine, and had slightly better performance than the Imp, being approximately 330 lb (150 kg) lighter. The same engine was also adopted by the Bond 875.

Like the earlier van version, the "Imp estate" was based on the two-door car, with the roof raised by 4 inches (100 mm) to provide a large carrying space above the engine bay, giving the car a square boxy look. The unusually flat roof was reinforced with stiffening ribs and supported on the inside of the vehicle with "synthetic foam noise-deadening material". When compared to the Commer badged panel van from which it derived, the Husky body also had extra stiffening at the rear window apertures.

Loading access was by a vertical top-hinged rear tailgate with the bottom of the opening level with the floor, making it easy to load without stooping down. Sliding windows gave ventilation and a view out from the rear bench seat. The top part of the back seat squab folded forward, forming a useful horizontal loading platform with a ribbed rubber surface, and 50 cubic feet (1,400 L) of capacity. To take the increased load, this was the first Hillman derivative to have radial-ply tyres. It also had uprated rear shock absorbers and rear springs were fitted along with a strengthened rear suspension. These gave the Husky more sporty handling than the standard Imp, and looked surprising when this tall vehicle went quickly around a corner with very little roll.

Once more Commer sold a commercial version of the same car, the van version, which was launched in 1965 and had the engine in low-compression form.

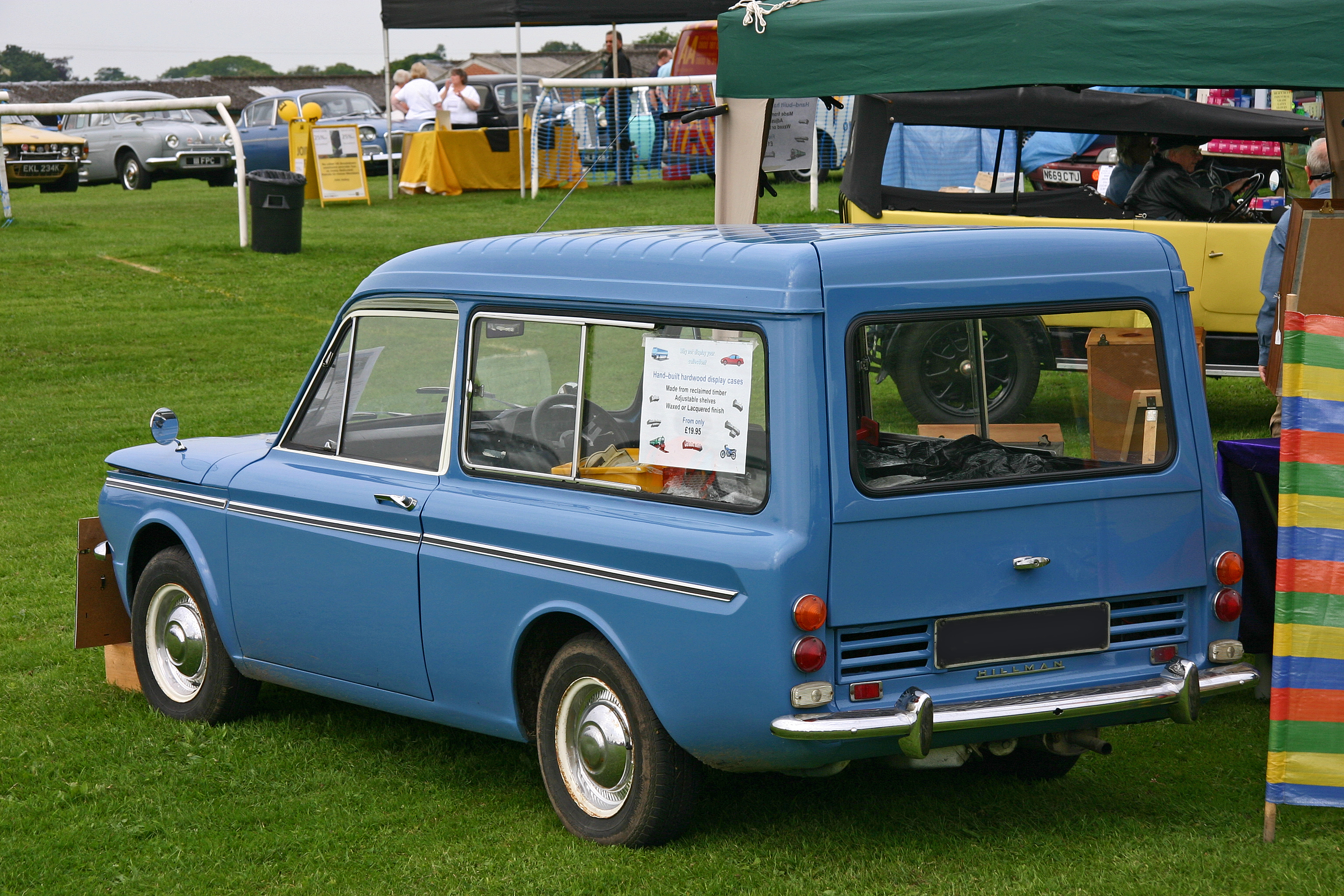
Hillman Husky (1967-1970)

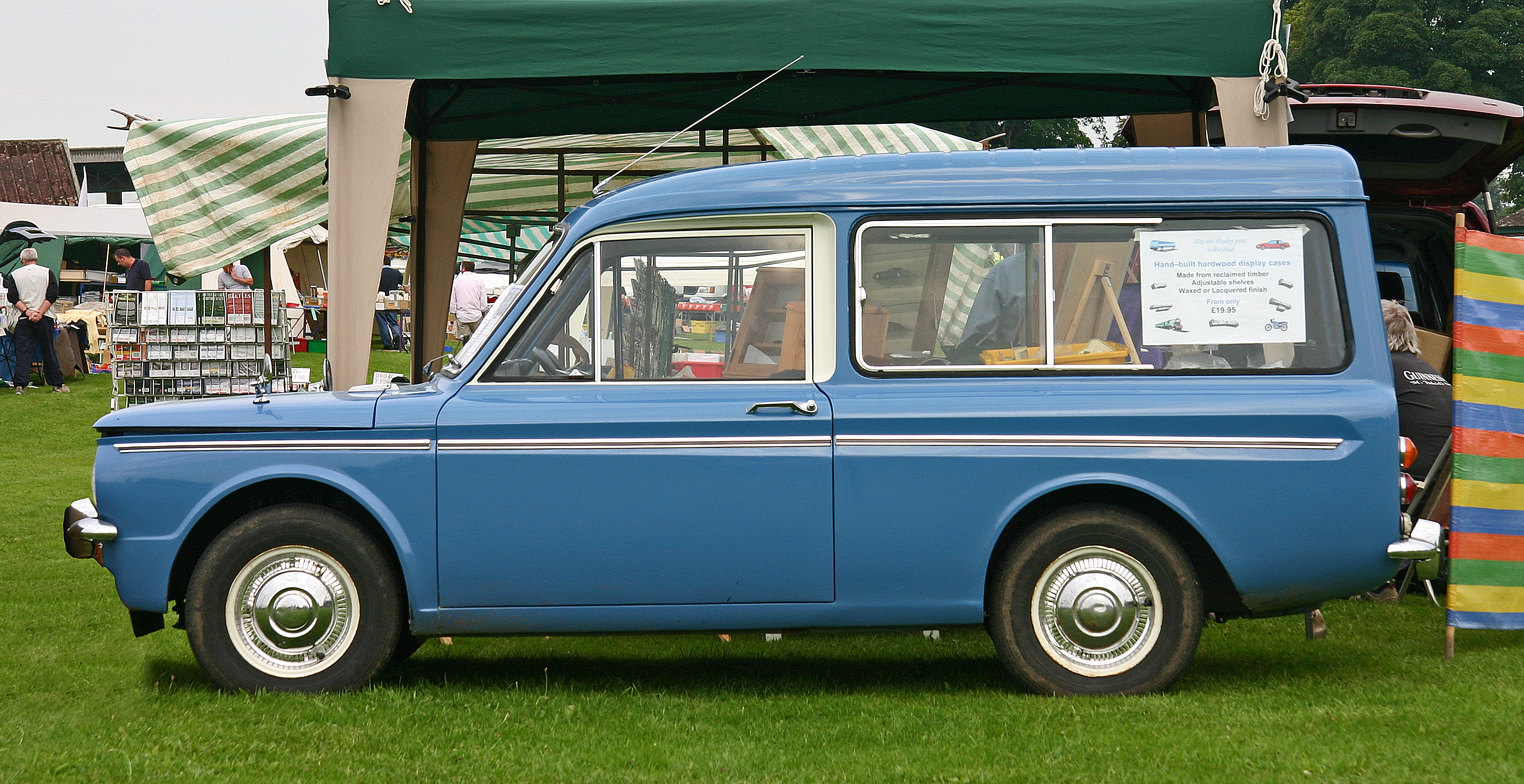
Hillman Husky (1967-1970)

The last Husky was built in 1970, at which point Chrysler Europe, new owners of Rootes, engaged in a major rationalisation of their products.

== Scale models ==
- Corgi Toys; No. 206 (production 1956–1960), Hillman Husky "Mk I", approximately O scale (1:44).
- Corgi Toys; No. 206M (production 1956–1959), Hillman Husky "Mk I", approximately O scale (1:44), friction drive.
