= Tim Fry =

British automotive engineer (1935–2004)

- Born: 1935
- Died: 2004 (aged 68–69)
- Occupation: Automotive engineer

Tim Fry (25 August 1935 – 17 May 2004), was an automotive engineer who, whilst in his twenties and working for the Coventry-based Rootes Group, designed the Hillman Imp, in conjunction with Mike Parkes. He subsequently became chief engineer at Chrysler Rootes. He left Rootes and set up the industrial design consultancy Smallfry in 1971.

Fry and Anthony Smallhorn were awarded the Prince Philip Designers Prize for the Sea Truck In 1979.

== Life ==
Fry died of cancer on 17 May 2004 in Rugby, Warwickshire. He was married to Karin and had two daughters.
