= Jeremy Fry =

British engineer (1924–2005)

Jeremy Joseph Fry (19 May 1924 – 18 July 2005) was a British inventor, engineer, entrepreneur, adventurer and arts patron.

== Early life ==
Born into the Fry family in Bristol, he was the son of Cecil Roderick Fry. Cecil was the last chairman of the J. S. Fry & Sons chocolate company, who enraged his family when he sold the company to rival Cadbury's. Jeremy was educated at Gordonstoun and joined the Royal Air Force as a pilot. After the war, Fry took up motorsport driving a 500cc Parsenn but quit after his cousin Joe was killed at Blandford.

== Career ==
He became a product designer with Frenchay Products Ltd between 1954 and 1957. He founded Rotork Engineering Company in 1957 after identifying the potential of valve actuators. As chairman, he oversaw Rotork's rise to becoming the market leader in equipment for use in oil and gas pipelines, refineries, power stations and waste water plants, and a member of the FTSE 250 Index.

Known as an inventor and engineer, his designs included a car, the Sea Truck (a flat boat ferry capable of carrying one car at high speed), and a four-wheel-drive wheelchair. Additionally he was responsible for starting James Dyson out on his own inventing career by mentoring him in 1970 at Rotork.

His friend Tony Richardson, the film and theatre director, described Fry (and their many travels together) in his autobiography Long Distance Runner (London, 1993; pp. 187–90).

== Arts patron ==
Fry possessed a keen interest in the arts and is remembered as the saviour of the Theatre Royal, Bath. He bought the theatre in 1979 and, as its chairman, oversaw its extensive renovation. In addition to being chairman of the Northern Ballet Theatre, he was the chairman of the Arnolfini Gallery in Bristol.

== Personal life ==
Fry led an extensive and hedonistic personal life before his marriage. A friend of society photographer Antony Armstrong-Jones, he was allegedly asked to be best man at Armstrong-Jones's marriage to Princess Margaret, the younger sister of Queen Elizabeth II. However, Fry's conviction for "importuning for immoral purposes" ruled him out, after an accusation of approaching a male for sex in Hyde Park, London, for which he was fined £2 by the court, became public. He withdrew from the role and instead, Dr. Roger William Gilliatt, was chosen to act as best man to Armstrong-Jones.

Fry married Camilla Grinling in 1955. They lived at Widcombe Manor in Widcombe, Bath, and had two sons and two daughters; the marriage was dissolved in 1967, before Grinling married John Fairbairn, with whom she had a son and two daughters. In 2004, Polly Fry, Jeremy's daughter with Camilla, claimed that her biological father had in fact been Armstrong-Jones. Anne de Courcy reported this claim by Polly, born in the third week of Lord Snowdon's marriage to Princess Margaret, that she was in fact Snowdon's daughter. Polly Fry asserted that a DNA test in 2004 proved Snowdon's paternity. Jeremy Fry rejected her claim, and Snowdon denied having taken a DNA test. However, four years later, after Jeremy had died, Snowdon admitted that this account was true.

== Death ==
Fry died in his palace in Madurai, Tamil Nadu, India, on 18 July 2005.
