= Max Fordham =

British industrial designer (1933–2022)

Max Fordham OBE RDI FREng FCIBSE Hon FRIBA MA
- Born: Sigurd Max Fordham; 17 June 1933; Highgate, London, England
- Died: 4 January 2022 (aged 88); Camden, London, England
- Occupation: Engineer
- Known for: Establishing Max Fordham LLP

Sigurd Max Fordham (17 June 1933 – 4 January 2022) was a British designer, engineer and pioneer of sustainable design and environmentally friendly engineering. He was the founder of building services engineering firm Max Fordham LLP.

== Early life and education ==
Fordham was born in Highgate, North London on 17 June 1933, to Molly Swabey, a journalist, and Michael Fordham, a house physician at St Bartholomew’s Hospital, London, who was becoming interested in Jungian psychoanalysis. His parents’ marriage dissolved in 1940. Michael remarried another analytical psychotherapist Frieda Hoyle the same year.

During World War Two, in the summer of 1940, Fordham went with his mother to stay with his uncle, Christopher Swabey, in Jamaica, to avoid the bombing of London. Fordham settled in well there and Molly decided to return to England. However, while crossing the Atlantic in 1942, her boat sank and she drowned.

Upon returning to England, Fordham attended the progressive Dartington Hall School, which intended to change social attitudes in the world.

After school (1952–54), Fordham did National Service as a pilot in the Fleet Air Arm. When he returned, he attended Trinity College, Cambridge, completing an MA in Natural Science (1954–1957). He chose to specialise in chemistry, physics, maths and mineralogy. This gave him a deeper education in chemistry and physics than he would have done if he had studied engineering.

Fordham found university disappointing and began to have doubts about becoming a scientist. He enjoyed the company of people studying the humanities and had shared rooms with Simon Hepworth-Nicholson, a school friend and artist. The professor of architecture, Sir Leslie Martin (designer of the Royal Festival Hall), suggested he consider heating engineering, a new field where he could be free to be inventive and design things using his physics degree.

== Working life ==
=== Early career (1958–1966) ===
Sir Leslie Martin arranged a job for Fordham as a development engineer at Weatherfoil Heating Systems Ltd in 1958, where he worked until 1961. There he completed a wide variety of design and research work. He designed the metered fan convection heating for Harvey Court, Cambridge, and was named as the inventor when this was patented. While Weatherfoil gave him a generous introduction to the building industry, they wanted to promote him away from design and into representing the firm. By this time, he realised this direction included all of the building services: water supply, drainage, heating, ventilation, air conditioning, as well as electrical engineering and he wanted more time to develop his detailing skills.

After meeting Sir Philip Dowson through his future wife, Thalia Dyson, in 1961 he joined the Building Group (now Arup Associates), a group that included architects and structural engineers from Ove Arup & Partners. Here Fordham had to get to grips with drawing the services in complete detail. It provided an integrated team, where discussions about services could be argued over the lunch table. Eventually, Fordham took on the public health and electrical services as well, so the services disciplines could be represented by just one person at meetings.

=== Establishing his own practice, Max Fordham LLP (1966–2022) ===
After moonlighting while at Arup Associates, Fordham realised he had the opportunity to start his own practice. In September 1966 he left Arup, and started working from his bedroom. Here he pursued a new approach to engineering based on his own curiosity about how buildings work. He resisted being pigeonholed into the conventional boxes of engineering. He was always interested in the whole building, taking a creative but essentially practical approach to building services design, starting "with the edge of the universe as its boundary and then quickly narrowing down to the specific problem".

Fordham did not like imposing his will on people, and developed a philosophical justification for reconstituting the practice as a democracy.

Fordham died from Alzheimer's disease at his home in Camden, London, on 4 January 2022, at the age of 88.

=== Teaching ===
Fordham was a visiting professor in building and design at the University of Bath from 1990 until his death. He was also an external examiner at the Architectural Association from 1991 to 1997 and from 2007 to 2011. Fordham also lectured to designers and architects at:

- University of Edinburgh, 1992–1994
- University of Cambridge School of Architecture 1996–1999
- Mackintosh School of Architecture
- University of Reading
- Yale University
- University of Plymouth
- Hong Kong University
- University of Bristol
- University of Cardiff
- Cambridge IDBE
- Rensselaer Polytechnic Institute
- The Bartlett
- University of Canterbury
- University of Singapore
- University of Birmingham
- University of Nottingham
- University of Loughborough, RCA.

=== Groups ===
Max was the Chairman of the Working Group for Communications for Building IT in 2000 and the Chairman of the Res Sub-Committee for Intelligent Façades for the Centre for Window & Cladding Technology in 1993.

== Notable projects ==
Max Fordham's practice has designed the building services for very many projects since 1966. Some notable ones where he had a major personal involvement are

- Snape Maltings Concert Hall, Suffolk (while at Arup Associates)
- Newport High School, Newport, South Wales
- Hulme 5, Manchester, high rise development, since demolished
- Raychem building, Swindon
- Alexandra Road Estate, Swiss Cottage, London, modern iconic dense terraced housing, first post-war housing estate to be listed (Grade II*)
- Queen's Building at De Montfort University
- Contact Theatre, Manchester
- Lighthouse Arts Centre, Poole
- Olivier Theatre, Bedales School, Hampshire
- Environmental Building, Building Research Establishment, Watford
- RMC International Headquarters, Egham, Surrey
- Indoor cricket school at Lord's Cricket Ground, St John's Wood, London
- Heelis, the National Trust headquarters, Swindon

The house designed for himself in north London by his practice (including himself) in collaboration with bere:architects and Price & Myers was soon after his death verified as the UK's first net zero carbon house.

== Honours ==
Fordham became a Fellow of the RSA in 1984. He received an OBE in 1994. He was elected a Fellow of the Royal Academy of Engineering in 1992 and an honorary fellow of the RIBA in 1996.

CIBSE (Chartered Institution of Building Services Engineers) presented its Gold Medal to him in 1997 for his part in raising the perceived value of CIBSE and with a bronze medal for a research paper. He was President of the Institution in 2001, after being Vice President in 1999 and President-elect in 2000.

He was on the judging panel for the RIBA Stirling Prize in 2005 and in 2006 was voted into the inaugural Building Hall of Fame, a list of 40 people who have had the most significant positive impact on the UK construction industry in the last 40 years.

Fordham won the Prince Philip Designers Prize in 2008. The honour is significant because the engineering of services installations in buildings is not usually associated with design.
