= Rotork =

British industrial flow control company

Rotork plc
- Type: Public
- Traded as: LSE: ROR; FTSE 250 component
- Industry: Engineering
- Founded: 1940s
- Headquarters: Bath, Somerset, UK
- Key people: Dorothy Thompson, Chair; Kiet Huynh, CEO
- Revenue: ▲£777.3 million (2025)
- Operating income: ▲£157.1 million (2025)
- Net income: ▲£116.9 million (2025)
- Number of employees: 3,500 (2026)
- Website: www.rotork.com

Rotork plc is a British-based company manufacturing industrial flow control equipment. It is listed on the London Stock Exchange and is a constituent of the FTSE 250 Index.

== History ==
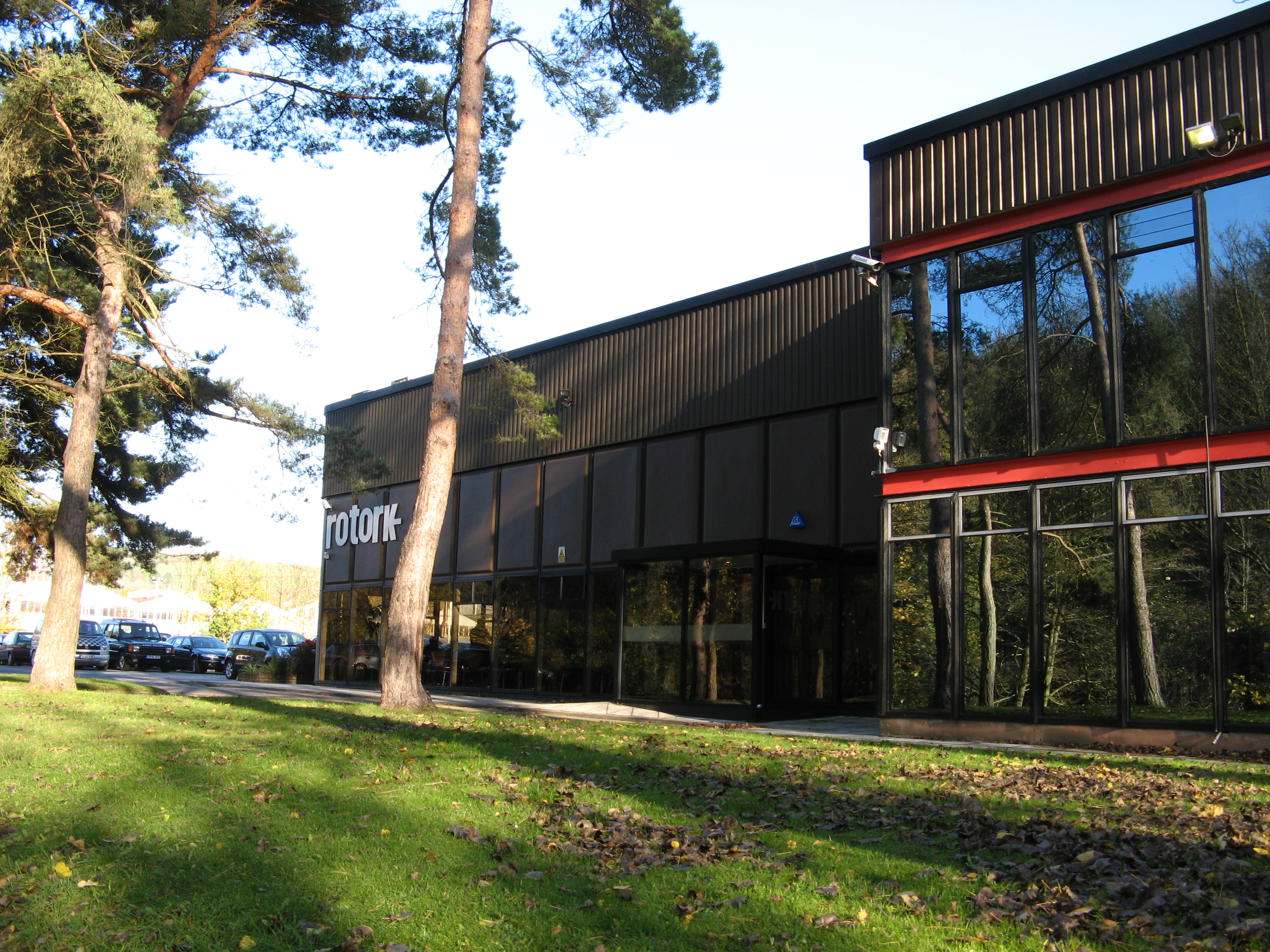
Rotork headquarters and factory in Bath

The company was established as a small engineering workshop in Bristol in the 1940s. In 1945 it was acquired by Frenchay Products led by Jeremy Fry. It made its first actuator in 1952. In 1957 Rotork moved to Bath, initially operating from Widcombe Manor, Jeremy Fry's home, with 12 staff. In 1962 it moved into a new production plant in Newbridge, Bath, which remains the company's headquarters. It was first listed on the London Stock Exchange in 1968.

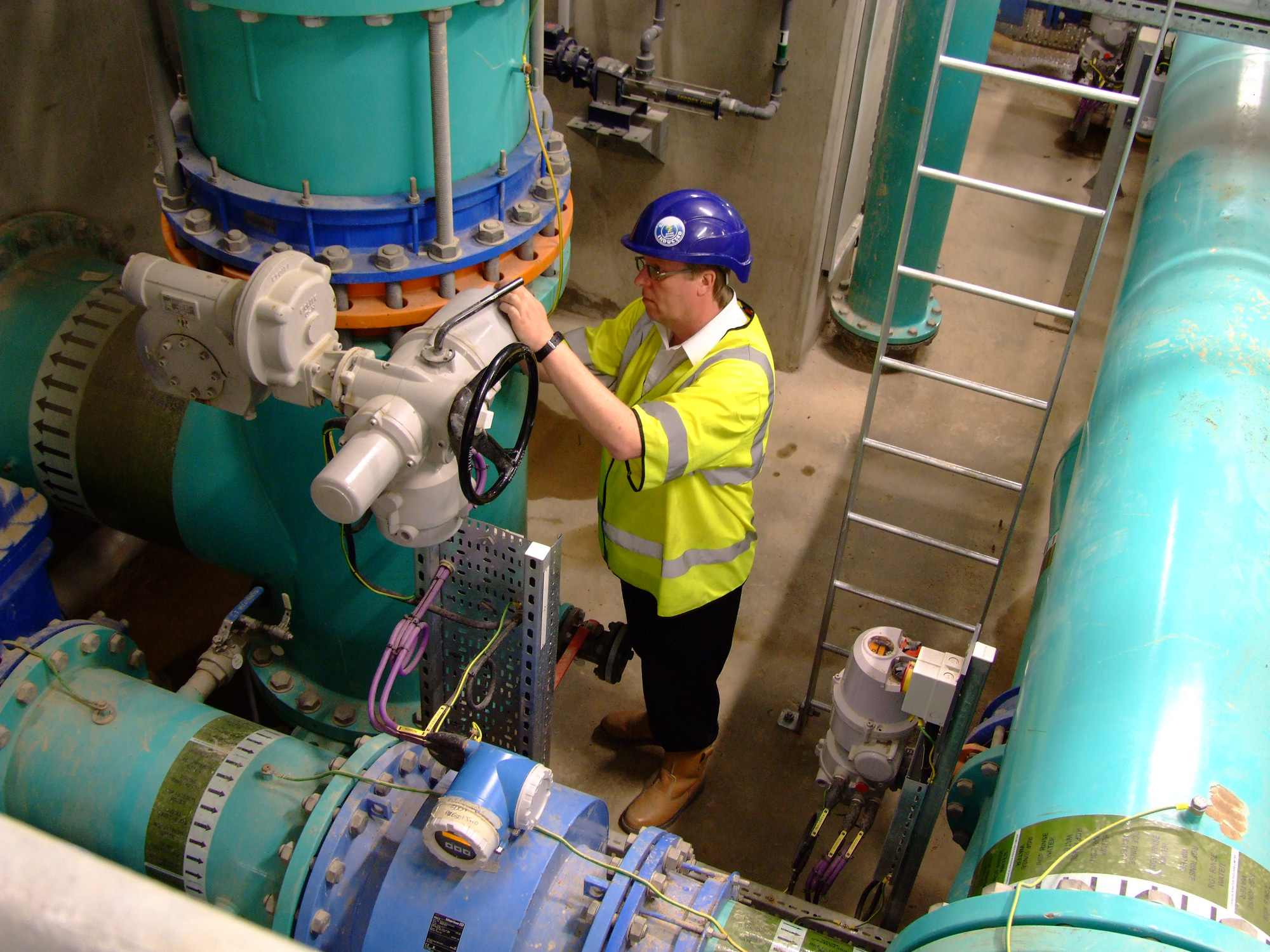
Electrically actuated butterfly valves controlling the automatic operation of filter plant in a water treatment works

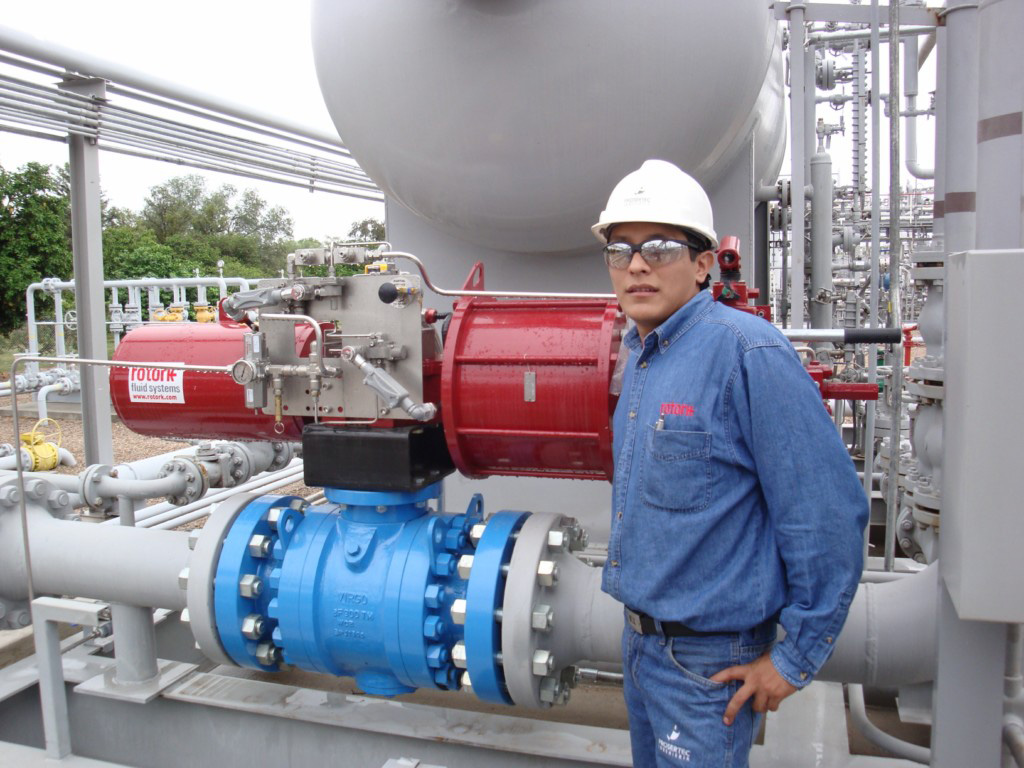
A pneumatically actuated safety shut-down ball valve in a natural gas processing plant

Protech Instruments & Systems, an instrumentation company, was purchased in 1985 to expedite the development of Pakscan, a digital bus control system for actuators. In 1999 it bought Fluid System Srl, an Italian actuator business, in 2000 it bought Skilmatic in Leeds and in 2002 it acquired Jordan Controls, a United States actuator business. It started operating in Sweden in 2008 with the purchase of Remote Control.

In 2009 the company acquired Flow-Quip, and in 2010 Ralph A. Hillier, US-based businesses. In 2011 Rotork Servo Controles de Mexico S.A. de C.V. became fully owned by Rotork after being part-owned since the 1970s. Shortly afterwards Rotork purchased Valco Valves Automation AS, Rotork's long term sales and service agent in Norway, now renamed Rotork Norway. Rotork acquired K-Tork International Inc., based in Dallas, and Centork Valve Control S.L., a Spanish actuator manufacturer based near San Sebastián.

In 2011 Fairchild Industrial Products in North Carolina was acquired. In the UK Prokits was purchased. In 2012 Italian switchbox manufacturer Soldo Srl was added and in 2013 the German actuator manufacturer Schischek was purchased.

Flowco in the UK and Renfro associates in the USA were further acquisitions in 2013, both adding to the company's service capabilities, and the Italian actuator manufacturer GT Attuatori Srl was also purchased. In 2014 Rotork acquired Young Tech Co. Ltd. (YTC), a Korean instrumentation manufacturer. In 2014 Rotork also acquired Xylem Flow Control Limited (XFC), based in Wolverhampton, UK, a leading manufacturer of solenoid valves and instruments under the Midland-ACS, Alcon Solenoid Valves and Landon Kingsway brands for £18 million. At the beginning of 2015 Rotork acquired part of Omas Teknik, its sales and service agent in Turkey. M&M International Srl, and Bifold Group were acquired in 2015.

Also in 2015 Rotork acquired Servo Moteurs Service, an actuator service business located in the South of France, as an important step forward in the development of Rotork's direct service offering to its customers and Roto Hammer, a manufacturer of custom-designed chain wheel manual valve operators based in Tulsa, Oklahoma, USA. In the beginning of 2016 Rotork acquired Mastergear, a leading manufacturer of manual and motorised gearboxes for valves, which has operations in Italy and the US, to strengthen its gearboxes offering.

Rotork acquired Hanbay in August 2023. The company designs and manufactures precise, miniature electric actuators that offer a compact profile and high torque design for small and instrument valves.

In March 2025, Rotork acquired Noah Actuation, a South Korean manufacturer of electric actuators. Headquartered in Seoul, Noah employs around 80 people and aligns with Rotork's end markets and key target segments.

In July 2026, ABB announced that it would acquire Rotork for $5.5 billion.

== Operations ==
The company is a designer and manufacturer of industrial flow control products encompassing valve actuators, gearboxes, control systems, instrumentation and accessories.
