= Roy Pierpoint =

British racing driver (1929–2023)

- Nationality: British
- Born: 15 May 1929 Weybridge, Surrey, England
- Died: 12 January 2023 (aged 93)

British Saloon Car Championship
- Years active: 1965–1971
- Teams: Weybridge Engineering Co. Ltd. Bill Shaw Racing; SRG; SCA Freight Ltd.
- Starts: 61
- Wins: 14 (2 in class)
- Poles: 4
- Fastest laps: 13
- Best finish: 1st in 1965

Championship titles
- 1965 1965, 1969: British Saloon Car Championship; BSCC - Class D

Roy Pierpoint (15 May 1929 – 12 January 2023) was a British racing driver who drove in saloons and sports cars.

== Racing career ==
His first race was in 1949, at a BARC meeting driving a Fiat 1100 special, which he built himself: "very neat was Pierpont's (sic) F.I.A.T. 1,100 with aerodynamic but not all-enveloping bodywork, two Amal carburetters, a neat silencer in its straight exhaust pipe and an oil-cooler ahead of the main radiator." He finished seventh in a 3-lap handicap.

Pierpoint raced very little after that until 1961. In 1962 he drove in several events including the BRDC Trophy at Silverstone, the Guards Trophy and the Brands Six Hour Race where he finished third in his class alongside Bruce Halford. Also that year, he achieved some success at Hill Climb events. He continued in sports car racing in 1963 and 1964, again in the Guards Trophy. In 1968 he was in the Nürburgring 1000 km race in a Ford GT40, but did not finish. He competed in 1968 and 1969 at Denmark's Jyllands-Ringen, with two wins from four races.

Pierpoint was best known for his time driving in the British Saloon Car Championship, with a total of fourteen race wins. In his first year in 1965, he won the Championship for Alan Mann Racing, driving a V8 4.7-litre Ford Mustang: "After a struggle throughout 1965 against the Austin Mini-Cooper S of Warwick Banks,.." The championship was won after a protest against the car of Jack Brabham, which was found to have illegal modifications. He raced a Ford Falcon the following year, which was not competitive enough to defend his title. He stuck with the Falcon for another three years. In 1968 he finished fifth on points and in 1969 he finished third in the championship. He spent two more years in the BSCC, but did not come close to winning the title in a Chevrolet Camaro.

== Racing record ==
=== Complete British Saloon Car Championship results ===
(key) (Races in bold indicate pole position; races in italics indicate fastest lap.)

Year	Team	Car	Class	1	2	3	4	5	6	7	8	9	10	11	12	Pos.	Pts	Class
1965	Weybridge Engineering Company Ltd.	Ford Mustang	D	BRH; 1	**OUL**; 1	**SNE**; 2	GOO; 3	**SIL**; 1	CRY; 1†	BRH; 2	OUL; 3					**1st**	**48**	**1st**
1966	Roy Pierpoint	Ford Falcon Sprint	D	SNE; Ret	GOO; Ret	SIL	CRY; 1†	**BRH**; 1	BRH; Ret	OUL	BRH					16th	16	5th
1967	Roy Pierpoint	Ford Falcon Sprint	D	BRH; 6	SNE; 3	SIL; 4	SIL; Ret	MAL; Ret†	SIL; Ret	SIL		OUL; 4†	BRH; 16			15th	16	4th
1967	Roy Pierpoint	Ford Mustang	D								BRH; Ret					15th	16	4th
1968	Roy Pierpoint	Ford Falcon Sprint	D	BRH; Ret	THR; Ret	SIL; 2	CRY; 3†	MAL; 3†	BRH; Ret	SIL; 3	CRO; 1	OUL; 2	BRH; 1	BRH; Ret		5th	44	**2nd**
1969	Bill Shaw Racing	Ford Falcon Sprint	D	BRH; 1	SIL; 2	SNE; 1	THR; 1	SIL; 1						BRH; 4	BRH; Ret	7th	44	**1st**
1969	Bill Shaw Racing	Chevrolet Camaro	D						CRY; Ret†	MAL; Ret†	CRO; 1	SIL; 1	OUL; Ret			7th	44	**1st**
1970	Bill Shaw Racing	Chevrolet Camaro Z28	D	BRH; Ret	SNE; 3	THR; 3	SIL; Ret	CRY; Ret†	SIL; Ret			BRH; Ret	OUL	BRH; Ret	BRH	31st	8	6th
1970	SRG	Ford Mustang	D							SIL; 36	CRO					31st	8	6th
1971	SCA Freight Ltd.	Chevrolet Camaro Z28	D	BRH	SNE; 5	THR	SIL	CRY	SIL	CRO	SIL	OUL	BRH	MAL	BRH	41st	2	8th

† Events with 2 races staged for the different classes.

Sporting positions
Preceded by Jim Clark	British Touring Car Champion; 1965	Succeeded by John Fitzpatrick
