= John Rhodes (racing driver) =

British racing driver (born 1927)

- Born: 18 August 1927 (age 99); Wolverhampton, England

Formula One World Championship career
- Nationality: (United Kingdom) British
- Active years: 1965
- Team: non-works Cooper
- Entries: 1
- Championships: 0
- Wins: 0
- Podiums: 0
- Career points: 0
- Pole positions: 0
- Fastest laps: 0
- First entry: 1965 British Grand Prix

John Rhodes (born 18 August 1927) is a British former racing driver from England, who participated in one Formula One World Championship Grand Prix, the 1965 British Grand Prix, at Silverstone on 10 July 1965, from which he retired on lap 39 with ignition problems. His Cooper T60 Climax was provided for him by veteran racer Bob Gerard.

As of October 2026, Rhodes is the oldest living person to have competed in a Formula One race.

In 1961, Rhodes drove a Cooper-B.M.C. Formula Junior car for the Midland Racing Partnership, winning a long race on the Phoenix Park circuit in Dublin on 22 July, and the Dunboyne Trophy on 29 July. On 11 June 1962, he drove Bob Gerard's Cooper-Ford in the 2,000 Guineas F1 race at Mallory Park. Rhodes soldiered on with the Cooper-B.M.C. FJ car in 1963 when the Ford engine was required to win. That year, he competed in a works Mini-Cooper 'S' type in saloon car racing, finishing 8th with Rob Slotemaker in The Motor International Six-Hour Saloon-Car Race at Brands Hatch on 6 July. In 1965, Rhodes continued with the Mini, taking fourth place, among the big bangers, in the Ilford Films Trophy at Brands Hatch on 13 March. He failed to finish in the BRDC International Trophy at Silverstone in Bob Gerard's Cooper-Ford on 15 May 1965.

At Le Mans in 1965, Rhodes, with Paul Hawkins, finished twelfth overall, and first in class, in a 1.3-litre Austin-Healey Sebring Sprite entered by the Donald Healey Motor Company, completing 278 laps. In 1966 at the Targa Florio, Rhodes partnered with Timo Mäkinen, finished ninth overall and won the class in an M.G.B.

== Racing record ==
=== Complete Formula One World Championship results ===
(key)

Year	Entrant	Chassis	Engine	1	2	3	4	5	6	7	8	9	10	WDC	Points
1965	Gerard Racing	Cooper T60	Climax V8	RSA	MON	BEL	FRA	GBR; Ret	NED	GER	ITA	USA	MEX	NC	0

=== Complete Formula One Non-Championship results ===
(key)

Year	Entrant	Chassis	Engine	1	2	3	4	5	6	7	8	9	10	11	12	13	14	15	16	17	18	19	20
1962	Gerard Racing	Cooper T59	Ford L4	CAP	BRX	LOM	LAV	GLV	PAU	AIN	INT; 13	NAP	MAL; Ret	CLP	RMS	SOL	KAN	MED	DAN	OUL	MEX	RAN	NAT
1965	Gerard Racing	Cooper T71/73	Ford L4	ROC; 11	SYR	SMT; 8	INT; Ret																
1965	Gerard Racing	Cooper T60	Climax V8					MED; Ret	RAN														

=== Complete British Saloon Car Championship results ===
(key) (Races in bold indicate pole position; races in italics indicate fastest lap.)

Year	Team	Car	Class	1	2	3	4	5	6	7	8	9	10	11	12	Pos.	Pts	Class
1963	Cooper Car Co.	Morris Mini Cooper	A	SNE	OUL	GOO ?	AIN ?	SIL								35th	5	9th
1963	Cooper Car Co.	Austin Mini Cooper S	A						CRY; 4†	SIL	BRH	BRH	OUL	SIL		35th	5	9th
1964	Cooper Car Co.	Austin Mini Cooper S	A	SNE	GOO	OUL	AIN	SIL	CRY; 3†							9th	20	**3rd**
1964	Downton Engineering Ltd.	Austin Mini Cooper S	A							BRH; 6	OUL; 6					9th	20	**3rd**
1965	Cooper Car Co.	Austin Mini Cooper S	B	BRH; 4	OUL; 4	SNE; 7	GOO; 16	SIL; Ret	CRY; 1†	BRH; 18	OUL; 5					**3rd**	**40**	**1st**
1966	Cooper Car Co.	Austin Mini Cooper S	B	SNE ?	GOO ?	SIL; 6	CRY; 1†	BRH; 9	BRH; 6	OUL; 2†	BRH; 5^					**2nd**	**50**	**1st**
1967	Cooper Car Co.	Morris Mini Cooper S	B	BRH; 4^	SNE ?	SIL; Ret	SIL; 3	**MAL**; 1†	SIL; Ret	SIL; 9	BRH; 7	**OUL**; 1†	BRH; 6			**3rd**	**58**	**1st**
1968	Cooper Car Co.	Austin Mini Cooper S	B	BRH; 5^	THR; 13	SIL; 7	CRY; 3†	MAL; 2†	BRH; 6	SIL; 14	CRO; Ret^	OUL; Ret	BRH; 10	BRH; 12		**3rd**	**50**	**1st**
1969	British Leyland Motor Corporation	Austin Mini Cooper S	B	BRH; Ret^	SIL; 11	SNE; 12	THR; 22	SIL; 6	CRY; 4†	MAL; 4†	CRO	SIL; 8	OUL; 13	BRH; 10^	BRH	18th	18	5th

† Events with 2 races staged for the different classes.

^ Race with 2 heats - Aggregate result.

Sporting positions
Preceded by Andrea de Adamich	European Touring Car Championship; Div. 2 Champion; 1968	Succeeded by Spartaco Dini
