= John Fitzpatrick (racing driver) =

British racing driver (born 1943)

- Fitzpatrick in 2014
- Nationality: English
- Born: 9 June 1943 (age 83) Birmingham, England, UK
- Retired: 1986

John Fitzpatrick (born in Birmingham, 9 June 1943) is a British former racing driver, winning many titles throughout his career. He works within motorsport as a consultant doing corporate events and driver management. He published a book "Fitz-My Life at the Wheel" in 2016.

Fitzpatrick was one of the best Porsche drivers of his era. He began his career driving Touring cars in the BSCC and ETCC, winning the British Saloon Car Championship in 1966. First it was Minis, then Ford Anglias and Escorts; BMW CSs and then Porsche 911s. He then became renowned for his expertise at driving the German machines. He was crowned European GT Champion in 1972, and then again in 1974. He moved to the United States in 1980, driving for Dick Barbour Racing, and capturing the IMSA Camel GT Championship in the process. He won the prestigious Porsche Cup in 1972, 1974 and 1980. In 1981, he moved from driver to team owner-driver, with some success.

== Racing career ==
=== BSCC years ===
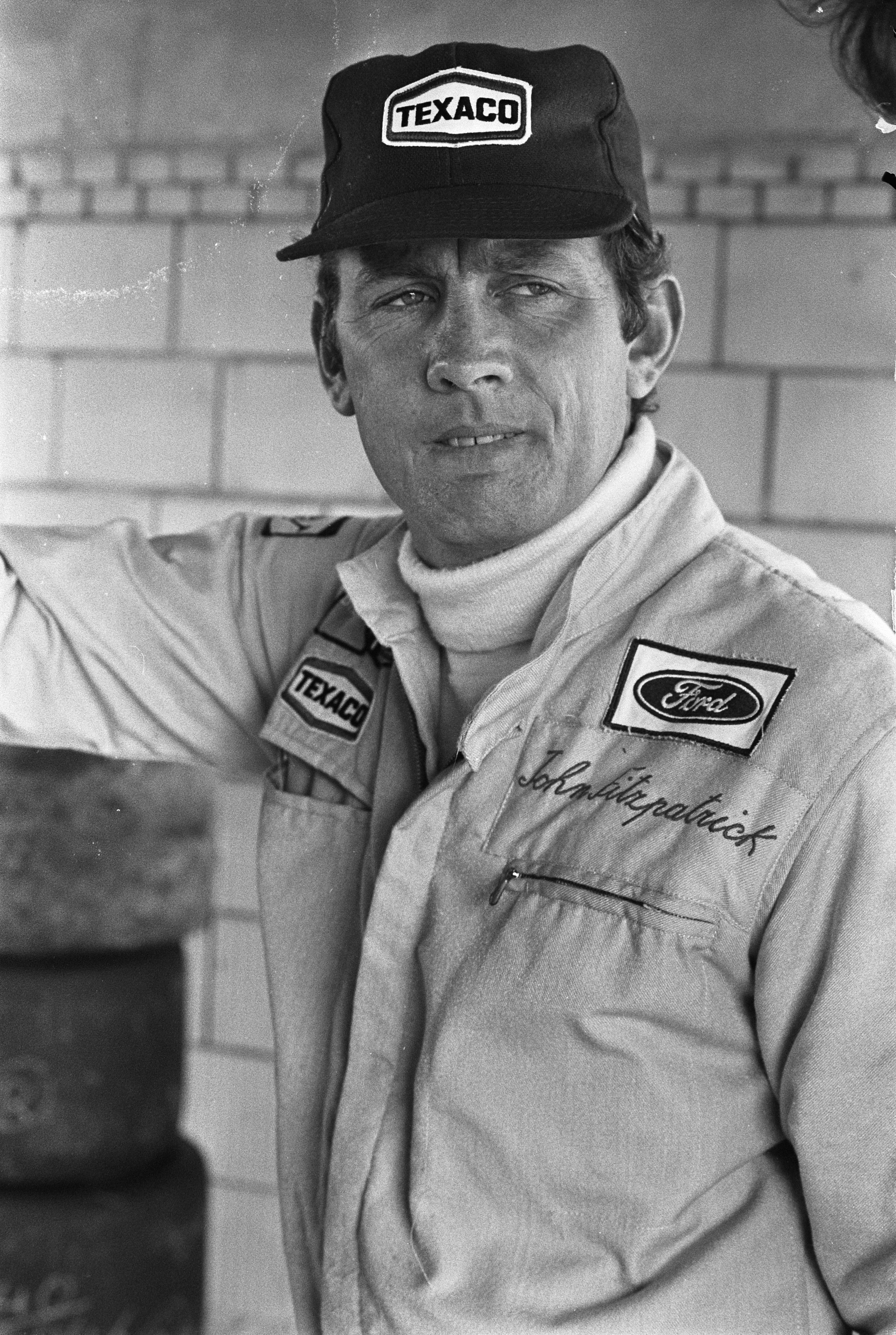
Fitzpatrick in 1973

Fitzpatrick had little racing experience before he entered the British Saloon Car Championship [BSCC], with his pre-career largely unknown. From 1963, Team Broadspeed, employed Fitzpatrick to race their Austin Mini Cooper S in the three of the closing rounds of the year. He won points, although his season was brought to a close with two retirements in the final rounds. For 1964, Fitzpatrick switched to the factory backed Cooper Car Company team, taking his first victory (in class) at the first race. A second win resulted from the fourth meeting, ultimately finishing second in the championship to Jim Clark.

In 1965, Fitzpatrick returned to Team Broadspeed, remaining with them for the rest of his BSCC career. The season saw Fitzpatrick claim three podiums (including a class win) in his Morris Mini Cooper S 970. It would be in 1966, however, that Fitzpatrick put his name into the BSCC history books. Team Broadspeed were contracted by Ford to run two 1000cc Ford Anglias in the BSCC, to be driven by Fitzpatrick and Peter Proctor. Peter Proctor had a severe accident in the Goodwood race and his place was taken by Anita Taylor. Fitzpatrick won the Championship overall. Fitzpatrick followed this with a second place overall the following year, before Broadspeed changed to the new Ford Escorts.

In the final four years that he competed in the BSCC, Fitzpatrick would not challenge for the title. Team Broadspeed bought a Ford Escort for Fitzpatrick, which meant he would compete directly with the Mini Coopers once more. 1968 saw the Escort struggle early on, however, as the car was not homologated until the third race of the year. Nonetheless, Fitzpatrick took four class wins on the trot during the middle of the season, finishing sixth overall. 1969 saw a further three wins for Fitzpatrick, resulting in a seventh place overall.

In 1970 and 1971, Fitzpatrick would claim a further fifteen wins in class, taking third on the championship in 1970. The new regulations introduced that year seemed to provoke Fitzpatrick to end his driving career in the series, as he entered the world of endurance racing full-time after 1971.

=== World of Endurance Racing ===
In 1971, Fitzpatrick had signed for the works Ford outfit, Ford Köln, to race in the European Touring Car Championship (ETCC), where he partnered Jochen Mass in the endurance events. After the pair finished fourth in Monza in their Ford Escort RS 1600, Fitzpatrick would race solo in a selection of events, winning the first of these, the Austria-Trophäe, at the Salzburgring. After not finishing any other races, until his final race of 1971, he won the Jarama 4 Hours in alongside Mass

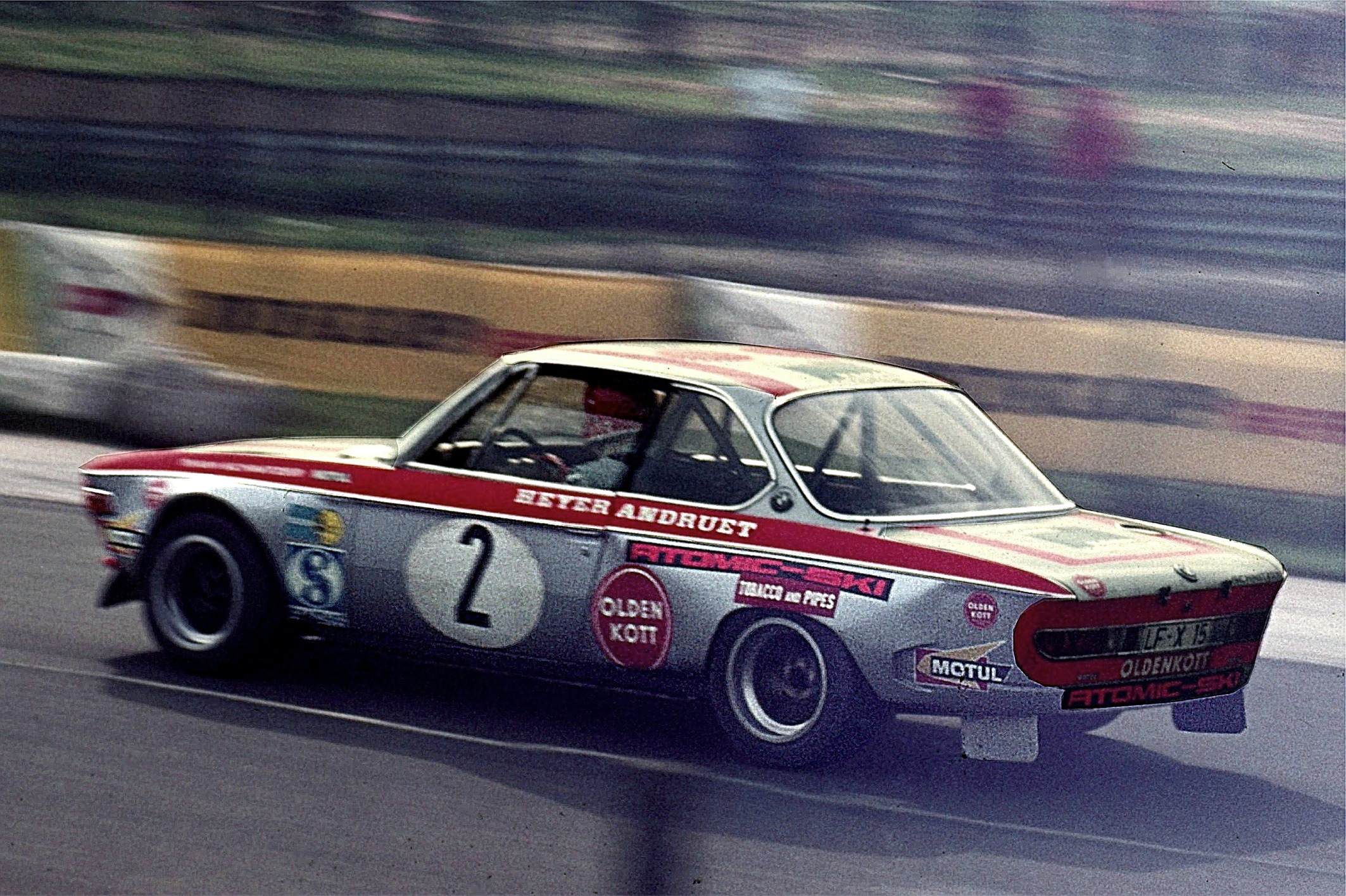
The BMW that Fitzpatrick co-drove to win the ’72 Grosser Preis der Tourenwagen

For 1972, Fitzpatrick switched to the renowned BMW Team Schnitzer, for another attack at the ETCC title. After a second place in the Brno 2 hours, he joined Rolf Stommelen and Hans Heyer to win the Grosser Preis der Tourenwagen, (sometimes known as the 6 Hours of the Nürburgring) in their BMW 2800 CS. He would finish sixth overall in the end of season standing, one better than the previous season. Meanwhile, away from the ETCC, Fitzpatrick was busy racing a Porsche 911 S for the Porsche Kremer team. He won five of the nine races in the inaugural European GT Championship, en route to the title, beating his nearest rival, Claude Haldi by more than double his points (125pts v 61pts). He also won the coveted Porsche Cup.

In the ETCC, Fitzpatrick returned to Ford Köln, to race their Ford Capri RS 2600. This switched back to Ford, saw him triumph again in the Austria-Trophäe, at the Salzburgring alongside raising Touring Car star, Dieter Glemser. After taking two more podium finishes, including a second place in the Spa 24 Hours, he would finish fifth in the overall standings.

1974 saw Fitzpatrick return to the European GT Championship. Although the new Porsche 911 Carrera RSR had no competition, the title chase was entertaining, but only because of the Cologne rivalry between Kremer and Georg Loos (Gelo Racing) teams. Drivers switched between the two outfits during the season, including John. Despite this Fitzpatrick got the title by a lot smaller, margin that in 1972 – just 9pts., after winning three races. In the lad from the West Midlands would also win the Porsche Cup for the second time.

Another season in the ETCC, and another switched of marques, as Fitzpatrick moves back to München, for the 1975 season. With John back again Schnitzer, he would win a third Austria-Trophäe. For the 1975 European GT season, Fitzpatrick was back with Gelo. It seemed that he might win a third title in four seasons, but fierce competition in the Gelo Team from Tim Schenken and Toine Hezemans, handed the title to Tebernuma Racing's Hartwig Bertrams and their RSR.

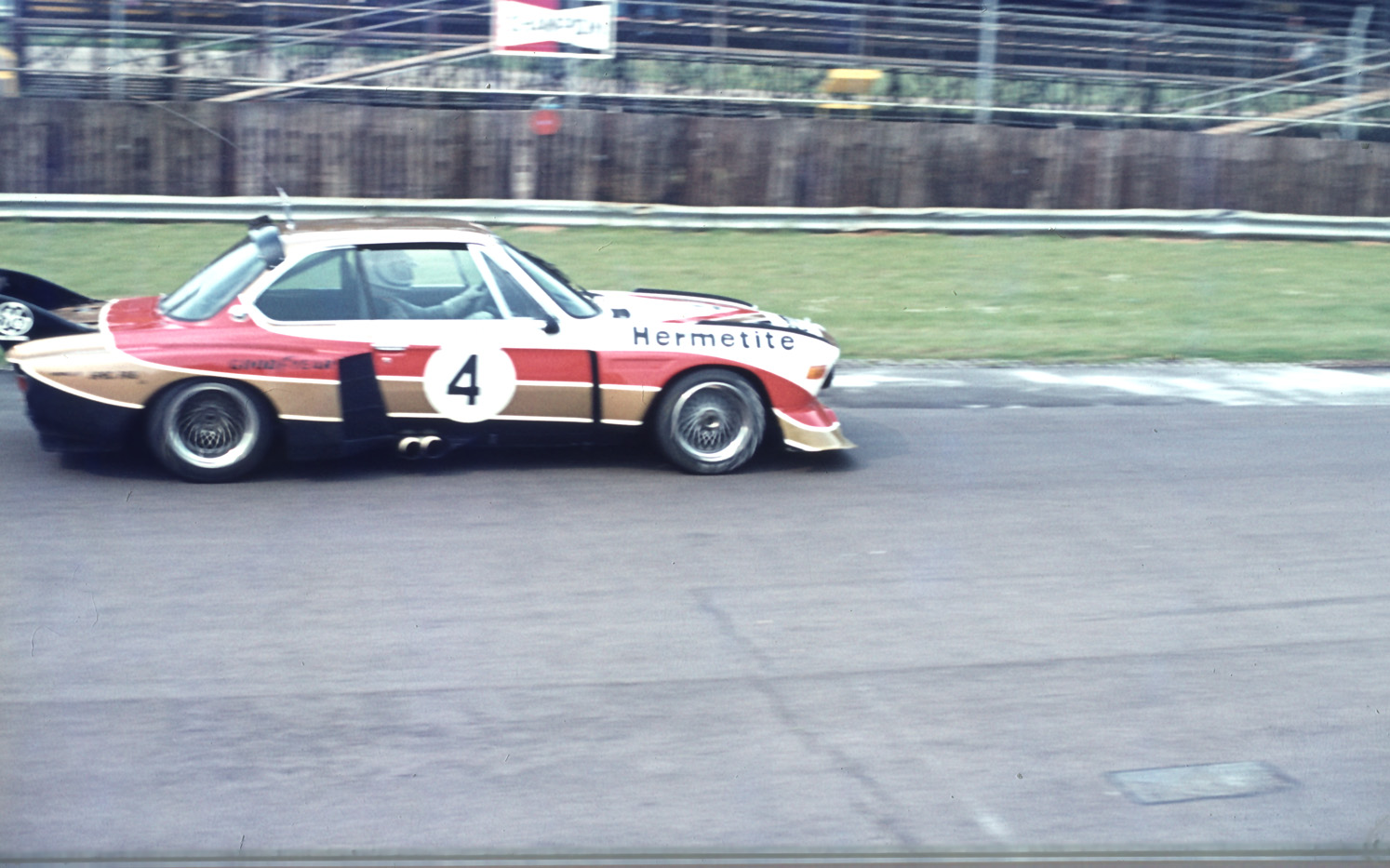
Fitzpatrick and Walkinshaw winning the Silverstone 6 Hours

1976 saw the eagerly awaited World Championship for Makes[WCM] based on silhouette cars arrive, but only one marque was ready; Porsche. Unfortunately for Fitzpatrick, he was racing a BMW 3.5 CSL for Hermetite Products. Although the car was supplied by BMW Motorsport, it was outdated really, but fragile. During the Silverstone 6 Hours, the works Porsche of Jochen Mass and Jacky Ickx hit trouble along with the fast turbo version of the BMW CSL of Ronnie Peterson and Gunnar Nilsson, allowing Fitzpatrick and Tom Walkinshaw through to the win by a mere 20 metres from Bob Wollek and Hans Heyer in a Porsche 935 K2. This pairing would also finish second in the 1000 Martha / Österreichring 6 Hours.

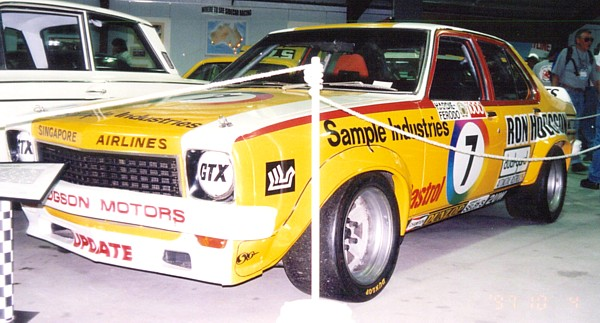
The race winning Morris/Fitzpatrick Holden LH Torana SL/R 5000 L34.

Away from the WCM, Fitzpatrick was winning races outside of Europe. He piloted a BMW 3.0 CSL on behalf of BMW of North America to victory in the 24 Hours of Daytona. Originally, Fitzpatrick was paired with Walkinshaw, but when their car retired, he was switched to the sister car of Peter Gregg and Brian Redman, which would go on to victory, winning by 14 laps. Following a second place in the RAC Tourist Trophy, he triumphed in the Hardie-Ferodo 1000 in an Australian Group C Holden Torana L34 touring car with Bob Morris driving for Ron Hodgson Motors. In a dramatic finish, Fitzpatrick nursed the Torana home trailing smoke over the last few laps. Initially thought to be an engine problem or a broken axle (which the L34 Toranas were notorious for doing), it was later revealed that an oil seal had failed and the leaking oil was getting into the clutch making it slip badly and slowing him down, especially on the steeper parts of the Mount Panorama Circuit.

Fitzpatrick was a regular driver at Bathurst, first teaming with 1967 winner Fred Gibson in an Alfa Romeo 2000 GTV in 1975, winning with Morris in 1976 while again joining Morris in 1977 and 1978 in a Torana (both DNF). He teamed with four-time winner Allan Moffat in 1979 in a Ford XC Falcon Cobra (DNF) and again in 1980 in a Ford XD Falcon (DNF). He returned to join forces with Bob Morris in 1981 (XD Falcon - second). His last appearance as a driver in Australia was to have been the 1982 James Hardie 1000, but after Morris qualified their Ford XE Falcon in sixth place, Fitzpatrick had a front wheel break going through Forrest Elbow during the Saturday afternoon practice session causing the car to crash heavily into the wall. The damage was enough to prevent the Seiko sponsored Falcon from starting Australia's Great Race.

For 1977, Fitzpatrick was back at Kremer Racing, where in five WCM races, he co-drove with Wollek to three podium finishes, reaching the top at Hockenheim. But Fitzpatrick's main drive for ’77 was back to Touring Cars. He had rejoined Broadspeed, to race the Jaguar XJ12C, however the racing programme got off on the wrong foot because British Leyland would not finalise the decision whether or not to continue with the programme following their debut in 1976. This mean Ralph Broad and Broadspeed guys did not know whether to get on with their development programme. Once Leyland gave the go ahead, valuable time had been lost. Fitzpatrick found himself partnering Tim Schenken, together they raced eight times for Jaguar, they only finished once, in the Grand Prix Brno, held on the old Masaryk Circuit, albeit in 16th place following an exploding tyre.

Despite Jaguar pulling out of the ETCC, Fitzpatrick found himself in great demand, so much so, he was racing in three major championships, winning races in all of them. His berth in ETCC was the Luigi Team / BMW Italia. Here, he teamed up with Umberto Grano to win the Mugello 100 Giri. Just three weeks earlier, at the very same Mugello, driving for Georg Loos (Gelo Racing) Team's Porsche 935, he won the Mugello 6 Hours, a round of the WCM. This time he was partnered by Toine Hezemans and Hans Heyer. When the series arrived in the United States, Heyer was replaced by Peter Gregg, for a race at the 6 Hours of Watkins Glen, helping Fitzpatrick and Hezemans to victory. The next round was back in Italy, the 6 Ore di Vallelunga, which although Fitzpatrick did not win, he did finish on the podium in second and third places! The third series Fitzpatrick drove in, was the Deutsche Rennsport Meisterschaft [DRM]. Although he had raced in the championship before, this was the first time he raced the whole series with Gelo Racing, finishing fourth overall in the process. During this season, he scored seven podium finishes, the best being his victory in the ADAC-Trophy at Zandvoort.

For 1979, Fitzpatrick dropped the ETCC from his schedule, concentration solely of Group 5 racing with Gelo Racing and their Porsche 935. There was mixed fortunes for Fitzpatrick, with winless season in the DRM. However, in the WCM, results were better. Firstly with new partners, Wollek and Manfred Schurti, John was able to retain the Mugello 6 Hours. With Fitzpatrick and Wollek entered in two cars for the Rivet Supply Silverstone 6 Hours. Their car with Schurti encountered Turbo problems, but the one with Heyer was victorious, winning by over seven laps. Gelo continued their good form, into the next round, with Fitzpatrick; Wollek and Schurti taking the spoils in the ADAC 1000 km Rennen.

=== IMSA years ===
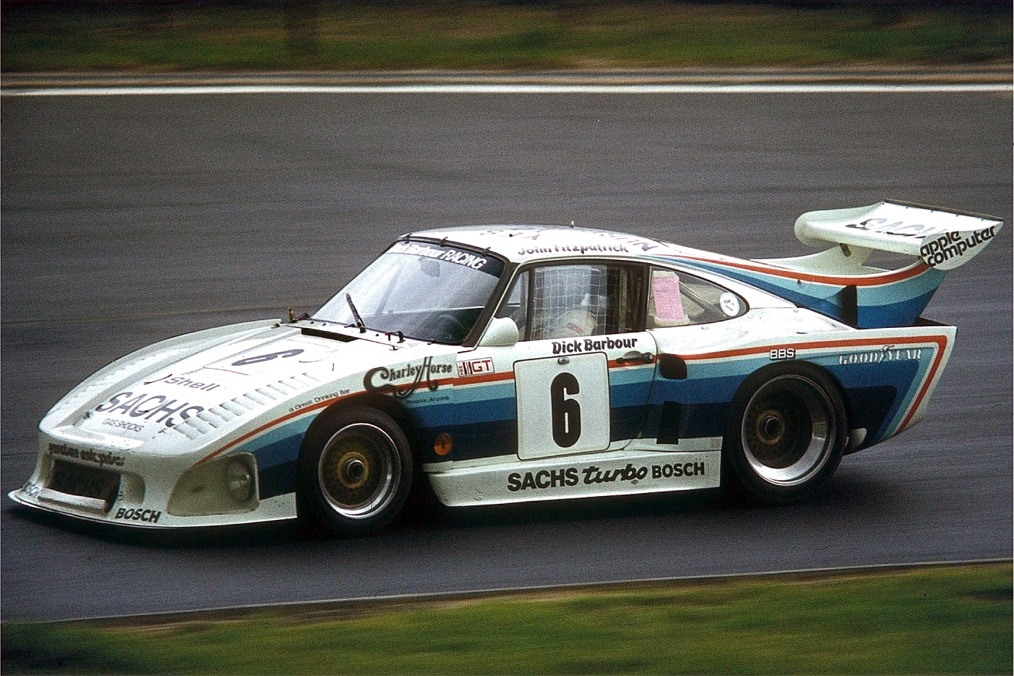
Fitzpatrick, Barbour & Plankenhorn en route to 2nd, in 1980 1000km Nürburgring

1980 was the year the Porsche 935K3 became prominent, both across Europe and North America. Dick Barbour Racing had two of their own cars and hired Fitzpatrick as their lead driver. This was a good choice, as the Englishman swept the IMSA GT Championship and beat everybody, including the 1979 Champion, Gregg, winning seven of the fourteen races. These included some of top races; 12 Hours of Sebring and Los Angeles Times Grand Prix, where he was partnered by Barbour and the WCM round at Mosport Park, where Redman joined him. Back in Europe, Fitzpatrick a Dick Barbour car to victory in the ADAC Norisring Trophäe, and 2nd place in the ADAC 1000 km Rennen. When Barbour's 935K3 wasn't available in Europe, Fitzpatrick piloted the Jägermeister Kremer version. Between these cars, he took three more wins, en route to 8th in the overall standings. This resulted in the Porsche Cup returning to his hands.

=== John Fitzpatrick Racing ===
In 1981, Dick Barbour experienced some financial setbacks and Fitzpatrick founded his own team, John Fitzpatrick Racing, with sponsorship from Sachs. In his debut season as the team owner-driver of John Fitzpatrick Racing, he was assisted by the Kremer brothers. By the second race of the 1981 season, he was back in Victory Lane, by winning the Camel GT race at Road Atlanta. Then co-driven by Jim Busby to another victory in the Los Angeles Times Grand Prix. Although the championship for 1982, was between John Paul Jr. and the Interscope Lola T600 of Ted Field and Danny Ongais, John Fitzpatrick Racing [JFR] had some good races with their impressive 935K4. John took the Mid-Ohio round, beating Paul Jr., then had another convincing in at Lime Rock. The 935K4 would not reappear until Road America, where Fitzpatrick took another convincing win, then again at Mid-Ohio, sharing with Englishman David Hobbs. Another Englishman, Derek Bell, partnered Hobbs to assist Fitzpatrick to his third Los Angeles Times Grand Prix win in four seasons. The other JFR 935 at the Riverside was entered for Bell and Stommelen, who was the fastest 935 driver at that time, according to Bell. Rolf went off the road and damaged the car when on fresh tyres, did another lap slowly to check the car out, then went full-bore again only to have the rear body collapse, causing him to lose control and hit a wall. The team had no idea of the severity of Rolf's accident and switched Bell to the Fitzpatrick-Hobbs car. The team of all-English drivers went on to win, unaware that Rolf had died.

Away from North America, Fitzpatrick was back behind the wheel of an ETCC Jaguar. He joined Tom Walkinshaw Racing for a few events, a best being a home victory in the Donington 500. Although the Jaguar XJS won on home soil, it was not without some drastic measures by TWR, like the second Jaguar blocking the leading BMW, and passing under a yellow flag. That second Jag was driven by Martin Brundle, Enzo Calderari and Fitzpatrick.

Thanks to a high level of sponsorship from J. David, Fitzpatrick was able to purchase two Porsche 956s to run in the World Endurance Championship [WEC] series and did in fact become the privateer to field a multi-car team of 956s. JFR was also the first use a 956 in the States, running in the Can-Am series because the car was prohibited from the IMSA Camel GT series because of safety issues. The SCCA allowed the 956 provided they complied with full Group C and Can-Am rules. Although this rendered them less than fully competitive, the team's 956 won at Elkhart Lake, on its first American outing. Whilst in the US, JFR had the opportunity of doing some unseen development work. When the 956 was returned to Europe, to race in the Grand Prix International 1000 km, at Brands Hatch, it featured many enhances not seen on the works cars. The soaking Kent track let JFR try out their aerodynamic tweaks and Fitzpatrick and partner for this race, Derek Warwick became only the second team to beat the works team.

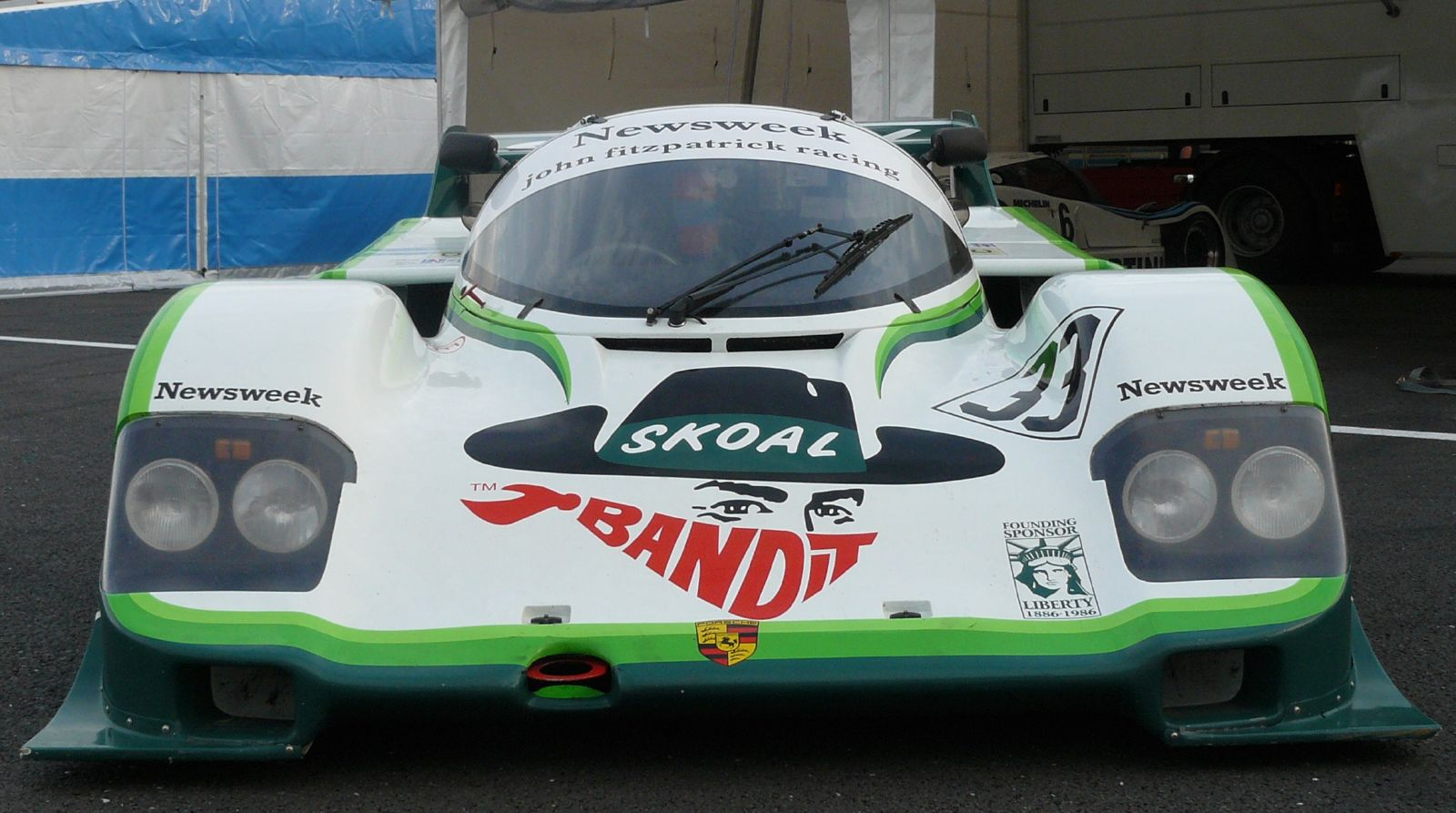
John Fitzpatrick Racing's Porsche 956, in Skoal Bandit livery

For 1984, Guy Edwards brought Skoal Bandit sponsor to the team. JFP added a Porsche 962, as well as a new 956, replacing the Brands Hatch winning 956. The 962 was not popular with JFR's drivers and was sold early into the 1985 season. Only one further victory was gained, this being in a DRM round at the Norisring with Thierry Boutsen behind the wheel, perhaps this was not really surprising, for by then there were so many top-class 956s in action that wins were spread very thinly amongst them.

When Skoal Bandit pulled out at the end of 1984, JFR had difficulty in maintaining adequate levels of finance. One car was leased to Manuel Lopez and raced with sponsorship from Canal 9 Peru; it was written off at Silverstone and had to be rebuilt around a new 962 chassis. With backing from the American 100s cigarettes, two cars were entered into the 1985 Le Mans 24 hours, but one of these, the rebuilt car crashed heavily in practise.

For the 1985 Norisring round of the WEC, the works Porsches were not entered, which left one of their lead drivers, Bell, without a drive, so Fitzpatrick offered him one. Bell called the 956 "diabolical. It was painfully, visibly slow, but I drove my backside off from virtually last place of the grid, struggling round to take 11th place shortly before the end". His works teammate, Hans Stuck, had electronic troubles with his Joest Racing Porsche, and eventually wound up 15th. So, at the end of the year, Bell was given the World Championship on the basis of this tie-decider – 11th as opposed to 15th at the Norisring.

After the 1000 km di Mugello, where he finished 4th with Hobbs and Boutsen, Fitzpatrick hung up his helmet, preferring to concentrate on team organisation. He relocated to Spain, and racing during 1986 with backing from various Spanish businesses, notably Danone, he retired from Motor Sport, and he sold his entire team, including racing cars, transporters and all equipment to Jochen Dauer.

Fitzpatrick intended to expand the team into CART for the 1984 season with J. David sponsorship using March customer chassis but the project did not come to fruition.

== Racing record ==
=== Career highlights ===
Season	Series	Position	Team	Car
1963	European Touring Car Challenge	88th	S.R. Broad & Sons Ltd.	Austin Mini Seven
1964	BRSCC British Saloon Car Championship	2nd	Cooper Car Co.	Morris Mini Cooper S
1965	BRSCC British Saloon Car Championship	10th	Team Broadspeed	Austin Mini Cooper S
1966	BRSCC British Saloon Car Championship	**1st**	Team Broadspeed	Ford Anglia
1967	BRSCC British Saloon Car Championship	2nd	Team Broadspeed	Ford Anglia
1968	RAC British Saloon Car Championship	6th	Team Broadspeed	Ford Escort GT 1300
	European Touring Car Championship – Division 1	11th	Broadspeed	Ford Anglia
	European Touring Car Championship – Division 2	12th	Broadspeed	Ford Escort GT
1969	European Touring Car Championship – Division 2	6th	Team Broadspeed	Ford Escort 1300 GT
	RAC British Saloon Car Championship	7th	Team Broadspeed	Ford Escort GT 1300
1970	RAC British Saloon Car Championship	3rd	Team Broadspeed	Ford Escort GT 1300
1971	RAC British Saloon Car Championship	4th	Team Broadspeed	Ford Escort RS 1600
	European Touring Car Championship	7th	Ford Köln	Ford Escort RS 1600
1972	European GT Championship	**1st**	Porsche Kremer Racing	Porsche 911 S
	European Touring Car Championship	6th	Team Schnitzer Motul	BMW 2800 CS
1973	European Touring Car Championship	5th	Ford Köln	Ford Capri RS 2600
1974	European GT Championship	**1st**	Polifac Racing; Samson Kremer Team	Porsche Carrera RSR
1975	European GT Championship	5th	Gelo Racing Team	Porsche Carrera RSR
1975	European Touring Car Championship	32nd	Scuderia Tornacum	BMW 3.0 CSL
1976	Hardie-Ferodo 1000	**1st**	Ron Hogdson Motors	Holden Torana LH L34
1977	Deutsche Rennsport Meisterschaft	29th	Vaillant Kremer Team	Porsche 935 K2
1978	Deutsche Rennsport Meisterschaft	4th	Wesiberg-Gelo-Team	Porsche 935-77A
	European Touring Car Championship	22nd	Luigi/BMW Italia	BMW 3.0 CSL
1979	Deutsche Rennsport Meisterschaft	6th	Gelo Sportswear Team	Porsche 935-77A
1980	IMSA Camel GT Championship	**1st**	Dick Barbour Racing	Porsche 935 K3
	World Challenge for Endurance Drivers	2nd	Dick Barbour Racing; Porsche Kremer Racing; Bob Penrod	Porsche 935 K3; AMC Spirit
	Deutsche Rennsport Meisterschaft	8th	Jägermeister Kremer Racing; Dick Barbour Racing	Porsche 935 K3
1981	Hardie-Ferodo 1000	2nd	Bob Morris Motor Sport	Ford XD Falcon
	Camel GT Championship	3rd	Kremer Racing; John Fitzpatrick Racing	Porsche 935 K3/80
	World Championship for Drivers	12th	John Fitzpatrick Racing	Porsche 935 K3/80
	Deutsche Rennsport Meisterschaft	33rd	T-Bird Swap Shop	Porsche 935 K3/80
1982	Camel GT Championship	3rd	John Fitzpatrick Racing	Porsche 935 K3/80; Porsche 935 K4
	FIA World Endurance Championship	11th	John Fitzpatrick Racing	Porsche 935/78; Porsche 935 K4
1983	FIA European Endurance Championship	4th	John Fitzpatrick Racing	Porsche 956
	Can-Am	8th	JDavid Racing	Porsche 956
	Deutsche Rennsport Meisterschaft	11th	John Fitzpatrick Racing	Porsche 935 K4
	FIA World Endurance Championship	17th	John Fitzpatrick Racing	Porsche 956
	Camel GTP Championship	23rd	John Fitzpatrick Racing	Porsche 935 K4
	European Touring Car Championship	45th	TWR Jaguar Racing with Motul	Jaguar XJS

=== Complete British Saloon Car Championship results ===
(key) (Races in bold indicate pole position; races in italics indicate fastest lap.)

Year	Team	Car	Class	1	2	3	4	5	6	7	8	9	10	11	12	13	Pos.	Pts	Class
1963	Broadspeed Engineering	Austin Mini Cooper S	A	SNE	OUL	GOO	AIN	SIL	CRY	SIL	BRH; 12	BRH; Ret	OUL; Ret	SIL			40th	2	11th
1964	Cooper Car Co.	Morris Mini Cooper S	A	SNE; 6	GOO; 12	OUL ?	AIN; 9	SIL ?	**CRY**; 2†	BRH; 8	OUL						**2nd**	**38**	**1st**
1965	Team Broadspeed	BMC Mini Cooper S	B	BRH	OUL; Ret												10th	18	9th
1965	Team Broadspeed	Austin Mini Cooper S	B					SIL; 9			OUL; Ret						10th	18	9th
1965	Team Broadspeed	Austin Mini Cooper S 970	A			SNE; 17	GOO; DNS		CRY; 4†								10th	18	5th
1965	Team Broadspeed	Morris Mini Cooper S 970	A							BRH; Ret							10th	18	5th
1966	Team Broadspeed	Ford Anglia	A	SNE ?	GOO ?	SIL; 14	CRY; 4†	BRH; 11	BRH; Ret	OUL; 6†	BRH ?^						**1st**	**50**	**1st**
1967	Team Broadspeed	Ford Anglia	A	BRH; Ret^	SNE ?	SIL ?	SIL; 6	MAL ?†	SIL ?	SIL; Ret	BRH; 8	OUL; 4†	BRH; 7				**2nd**	**62**	**1st**
1968	Team Broadspeed	Ford Escort 1300 GT	B	BRH; Ret^	THR; Ret	SIL; 8	**CRY**; Ret†	**MAL**; 1†	BRH; 3	SIL; 8	CRO; 7^	OUL; NC	BRH; Ret	BRH; 9^			6th	42	**2nd**
1969	Team Broadspeed	Ford Escort 1300 GT	B	BRH; Ret^	SIL; 5	SNE; Ret	THR; Ret	SIL; 8	CRY; Ret†	MAL; Ret†	CRO; 4^	SIL; 6	OUL; 9	BRH; 8	BRH; 6		7th	44	**3rd**
1970	Team Broadspeed	Ford Escort 1300 GT	B	BRH; Ret^	SNE; 8	THR; 9	SIL; 6	**CRY**; 1†	SIL; 9	SIL; 29^	CRO; 5^	BRH; 4	OUL; 6	BRH; 4^			**3rd**	**62**	**1st**
1970	Team Broadspeed	Ford Escort TC	C												BRH; 1		**3rd**	**62**	NC
1971	Team Broadspeed Castrol	Ford Escort RS1600	C	**BRH**; 1^	**SNE**; 2	THR; Ret	SIL; 3	CRY; Ret†	SIL; 4	CRO	SIL; 7	OUL; 2	**BRH**; 1	**MAL**; 2†	BRH; Ret		4th	67	**1st**
1972	Team Broadspeed	Ford Escort RS1600	C	BRH	OUL	THR	SIL	CRY	BRH	OUL	SIL; 13^	MAL	BRH				43rd	4	12th
1973	Ford Köln	Ford Capri RS2600	D	BRH	SIL	THR	THR	SIL	ING	BRH	SIL; 17^	BRH					NC	0	NC
1974	Gerry Edmonds Racing	Triumph Dolomite Sprint	B	MAL	BRH	SIL	OUL	THR	SIL	THR	BRH	ING	BRH; 5†	OUL	SNE; 6	BRH	34th	3	12th
1978	Hermetite Racing with Leyland	Triumph Dolomite Sprint	C	SIL	OUL; 2†	THR; Ret	BRH; Ret†	SIL; 6	DON	MAL	BRH	DON; 8†	BRH ?	THR ?	OUL		12th	28	4th

† Events with 2 races staged for the different classes.

^ Race with 2 heats - Aggregate result.

=== Complete 24 Hours of Le Mans results ===
Year	Team	Co-drivers	Car	Class	Laps	Pos.	Class pos.
1972	(West Germany) Porsche Kremer Racing Team	(West Germany) Erwin Kremer	Porsche 911 S	GT	39	DNF	DNF
1973	(West Germany) Ford Motorenwerke	(West Germany) Dieter Glemser (West Germany) Hans Heyer	Ford Capri RS 2600	T3.0	239	DNF	DNF
1975	(West Germany) Gelo Racing Team	(Netherlands) Toine Hezemans (Netherlands) Gijs van Lennep (Liechtenstein) Manfred Schurti (West Germany) Georg Loos	Porsche Carrera RSR	GT	316	5th	**1st**
1976	(West Germany) Hermetite Products Ltd.	(United Kingdom) Tom Walkinshaw	BMW 3.5 CSL	Gr.5	17	DNF	DNF
1977	(West Germany) Porsche Kremer Racing	(United Kingdom) Guy Edwards (United Kingdom) Nick Faure	Porsche 935	Gr.5	15	DNF	DNF
1978	(West Germany) Weisberg Gelo Team	(Netherlands) Toine Hezemans	Porsche 935/77A	Gr.5	19	DNF	DNF
1979	(West Germany) Gelo Sportswear International	(West Germany) Harald Grohs (France) Jean-Louis Lafosse	Porsche 935/77A	Gr.5 +2.0	196	DNF	DNF
1980	(United States) Dick Barbour	(United Kingdom) Brian Redman (United States) Dick Barbour	Porsche 935 K3/80	IMSA	318	5th	**1st**
1982	(United Kingdom) John Fitzpatrick Racing	(United Kingdom) David Hobbs	Porsche 935/78-81	IMSA; GTX	329	4th	**1st**
1983	(United Kingdom) John Fitzpatrick Racing	(United Kingdom) Guy Edwards (United Kingdom) Rupert Keegan	Porsche 956	C	359	5th	5th
1983	(United Kingdom) John Fitzpatrick Racing	(Austria) Dieter Quester (United Kingdom) David Hobbs	Porsche 956	C	135	DNF	DNF

=== Complete 24 Hours of Daytona results ===
Year	Team	Co-drivers	Car	Class	Laps	Pos.	Class pos.
1973	(West Germany) Porsche Kremer Racing	(West Germany) Erwin Kremer (Switzerland) Paul Keller	Porsche 911 S	GT +2.0	630	6th	5th
1976	(United States) BMW of North America	(United States) Peter Gregg (United Kingdom) Brian Redman	BMW 3.0 CSL	GTO	545	**1st**	**1st**
1976	(United States) BMW of North America	(United Kingdom) Tom Walkinshaw	BMW 3.0 CSL	GTO	457	15th (DNF)	10th (DNF)
1977	(United States) KWM Racing	(United States) Kenper Miller (United States) Paul Miller	BMW 3.5 CSL	GTO	368	DNF	DNF
1979	(West Germany) Gelo Racing Team	(Liechtenstein) Manfred Schurti (France) Bob Wollek	Porsche 935/77A	GTX	135	DNF	DNF
1980	(United States) Dick Barbour Racing	(Liechtenstein) Manfred Schurti (United States) Dick Barbour	Porsche 935 K3/80	GTX	405	29th	9th
1981	(West Germany) Kremer Racing	(United States) Jim Busby (France) Bob Wollek	Porsche 935 K3/80	GTX	167	DNF	DNF
1982	(United Kingdom) John Fitzpatrick Racing	(United Kingdom) David Hobbs (United States) Wayne Baker	Porsche 935 K3/80	GTP	59	DNF	DNF

=== Complete 12 Hours of Sebring results ===
Year	Team	Co-drivers	Car	Class	Laps	Pos.	Class pos.
1972	(United States) Libra International Racing	(United States) John Buffum	Ford Escort RS 1600	T2.5	97	27th	**1st**
1980	(United States) Dick Barbour Racing	(United States) Dick Barbour	Porsche 935 K3/80	GTX	253	**1st**	**1st**
1981	(United Kingdom) John Fitzpatrick Racing	(United States) Jim Busby	Porsche 935 K3/80	GTX	129	DNF	DNF
1982	(United Kingdom) John Fitzpatrick Racing	(United Kingdom) David Hobbs	Porsche 935 K3/80	GTP	7	DNF	DNF

=== Complete 24 Hours of Spa results ===
Year	Team	Co-drivers	Car	Class	Laps	Pos.	Class pos.
1965	(United Kingdom) Team Broadspeed	(United Kingdom) John Handley	Morris Mini Cooper S	T1.3		DNF	DNF
1969	(Belgium) Ford Chevron Racing Team	(Belgium) Yvette Fontaine	Ford Escort TC	Div.2		11th	2nd
1970	(Belgium) Ford Chevron Racing Team	(Belgium) Gustaaf Witvrouw	Ford Escort TC	Div.2/Gr.2		DNF	DNF
1971	(West Germany) Ford Köln	(France) François Mazet	Ford Escort RS 1600	Div.2		DNF	DNF
1972	(West Germany) Team Schnitzer Motul	(Belgium) Alain Peltier (France) Christian Ethuin	BMW 2800 CS	Div.3	304	4th	4th
1972	(West Germany) Team Schnitzer Motul	(West Germany) Hans Heyer	BMW 2800 CS	Div.3	160	DNF	DNF
1973	(West Germany) Ford	(West Germany) Jochen Mass	Ford Capri RS 2600 LW	Div.2	298	2nd	2nd
1974	(United Kingdom) Ford UK/Hermetitie	(United Kingdom) Tom Walkinshaw	Ford Capri II 3.0	Div.4		DNF	DNF
1975	(United Kingdom) Hermetitie Products	(United Kingdom) Tom Walkinshaw	Ford Capri II 3.0	Div.4		DNF	DNF
1978	(United Kingdom) Veedol Team	(United Kingdom) Les Blackburn (United Kingdom) Stuart Rolt	Ford Capri II 3.0	Gr.1 +2.5		DNF	DNF

=== Complete 12 Hours of Reims results ===
Year	Team	Co-drivers	Car	Class	Laps	Pos.	Class pos.
1967	(United Kingdom) David Prophet	(United Kingdom) David Prophet	Ferrari 250 LM	P+2.0		DNF	DNF

=== Complete Bathurst 1000 results ===
Year	Team	Co-drivers	Car	Class	Laps	Pos.	Class pos.
1975	Alfa Romeo Dealers Australia	(Australia) Fred Gibson	Alfa Romeo 2000 GTV	B	12	DNF	DNF
1976	(Australia) Ron Hodgson Motors	(Australia) Bob Morris	Holden LH Torana SL/R 5000 L34	3001cc - 6000cc	163	1st	1st
1977	(Australia) Ron Hodgson Motors	(Australia) Bob Morris	Holden LX Torana SS A9X 4-Door	3001cc - 6000cc	111	DNF	DNF
1978	(Australia) Ron Hodgson Motors	(Australia) Bob Morris	Holden LX Torana SS A9X Hatchback	A	73	DNF	DNF
1979	(Australia) Allan Moffat Racing	(Canada) Allan Moffat	Ford XC Falcon GS500 Hardtop	A	136	DNF	DNF
1980	(Australia) Allan Moffat Racing	(Canada) Allan Moffat	Ford XD Falcon	3001-6000cc	3	DNF	DNF
1981	(Australia) Bob Morris Motor Sport	(Australia) Bob Morris	Ford XD Falcon	8 Cylinder & Over	120	2nd	2nd
1982	(Australia) Seiko Watches	(Australia) Bob Morris	Ford XE Falcon	A	-	DNS	DNS

Sporting positions
Preceded by Roy Pierpoint	British Touring Car Champion; 1966	Succeeded by Frank Gardner
Preceded by n/a	European GT Champion; 1972	Succeeded by Claude Ballot-Léna
Preceded by Claude Ballot-Léna	European GT Champion; 1974	Succeeded by Hartwig Bertrams
Preceded by Peter Gregg	IMSA Camel GT Champion; 1980	Succeeded by Brian Redman
Preceded by Peter Brock; Brian Sampson	Winner of the Bathurst 1000; 1976 (with Bob Morris)	Succeeded by Allan Moffat; Jacky Ickx
Preceded by Erwin Kremer	Porsche Cup; 1972	Succeeded by Clemens Schickentanz
Preceded by Clemens Schickentanz	Porsche Cup; 1974	Succeeded by Claude Haldi
Preceded by Klaus Ludwig	Porsche Cup; 1980	Succeeded by Bob Wollek
