= GROW model =

Method for goal setting and problem solving

The GROW model (or process) is a simple method for goal setting and problem solving. It was developed in the United Kingdom and has been used extensively in corporate coaching from the late 1980s and 1990s.

== Stages of GROW ==
There are a number of different versions of the GROW model. The following table presents one view of the stages but there are others. The "O" in this version has multiple meanings.

G	Goal	The Goal is the end point, where the client wants to be. The goal has to be defined in such a way that it is very clear to the client when they have achieved it.
R	Reality	The current Reality is where the client is now. What are the issues, the baseline, and how far away is the client from their goal?
O	Obstacles	There will be Obstacles stopping the client getting from where they are now to where they want to go. If there were no Obstacles the client would already have reached their goal.
O	Options	Once Obstacles have been identified, the client needs to find ways of dealing with them if they are to make progress. These are the Options.
W	Way Forward	The Options then need to be converted into action steps which will take the client to their goal. These are the Way Forward. The "W" of GROW can also include When, by Whom, and the Will (or intention/commitment) to do it.

As with many simple principles, any user of GROW can apply a great deal of skill and knowledge at each stage but the basic process remains as written above. There are numerous questions which the coach could use at any point and part of the skill of the coach is to know which questions to use and how much detail to uncover.

=== Example ===
The following is a very simple example of using the GROW model to achieve a goal. This example deals with weight loss. If the client wants: "To bring my weight down to 120 pounds in three months and keep it down", that is their Goal. The more heartfelt and personal, the more meaningful the goal is to the person and the more likely they will be to commit to and achieve the goal.

The GROW approach would then be to establish the Reality by stating what their weight is now. The coach would then ask awareness questions to deepen understanding of what is happening when the client tries to lose weight, thus identifying the Obstacles. These questions could include:

- When you have been able to lose weight—what made the difference?
- What is the difference between the times you are able to keep weight off and the times when you put it on again?
- What would have to change for you to be sure you could lose the weight and keep it off?

If the client genuinely answers these questions they will discover new information about what works and does not work for them in terms of weight loss, and create some potential for change. It then becomes possible to create some strategies or Options which get around the Obstacles. These could include looking at which diets or exercise regimes work best, or finding a specific type of support. Once the client knows the strategies that are likely to work they can establish a Way Forward which involves taking action steps. This is where they commit to what they will do in the short term to put the strategies into effect. For instance, one action might be asking a particular person for support, and another might be to buy a different selection of foods.

GROW neatly highlights the nature of a problem for coaching purposes. In order for a problem to exist in coaching terms there have to be two elements present. Firstly there has to be something that the client is trying to achieve—the Goal. Then there has to be something stopping them achieve that goal—the Obstacle(s). Using GROW automatically breaks a problem down into these component parts.

The same principles can be applied whatever goal or problem the client has. GROW can be used on technical problems, issues regarding processes, strategy questions, interpersonal issues and many more. The model can also be used by a group who are all working on the same problem or goal.

== History ==
In a 2009 article, John Whitmore claimed that Max Landsberg coined the name GROW during a conversation with Graham Alexander and that Whitmore was the first to publish it in the 1992 first edition of his book Coaching for Performance. Landsberg also published it a few years later in the 1996 first edition of his book The Tao of Coaching. Elsewhere Whitmore said that the model had been in use for some time before it was given the name GROW. Alan Fine's 2010 book You Already Know How to Be Great claimed that Fine had codeveloped the model with Whitmore and Alexander. Other (later) similar models include collaborative helping maps in family therapy and Gabriele Oettingen's WOOP model.

== The GROW principle and the Inner Game ==
GROW was influenced by the Inner Game method developed by Timothy Gallwey. Gallwey was a tennis coach who noticed that he could often see what players were doing incorrectly but that simply telling them what they should be doing did not bring about lasting change.

The parallel between Gallwey's Inner Game method and the GROW method can be illustrated by the example of players who do not keep their eyes on the ball. Some coaches have previously given instructions such as: "Keep your eye on the ball" to try to correct this. The problem with this sort of instruction is that a player will be able to follow it for a short while but may be unable to keep it in mind in the long term. So one day, instead of giving an instruction, Gallwey asked players to say "bounce" out loud when the ball bounced and "hit" out loud when they hit the ball.

The result was that the players started to improve without a lot of effort because they were keeping their eyes on the ball. But because of the way the instruction was given they did not have a voice in their heads saying "I must keep my eye on the ball." Instead they were playing a simple game while they were playing tennis. Once Gallwey saw how play could be improved in this way, he stopped giving instructions and started asking questions that would help players discover for themselves what worked and what needed to change.

The GROW method is similar. For example, the first stage in the learning process would be to set a target which a player wants to achieve. If a player wanted to improve their first serve Gallwey would ask how many first serves out of ten they would like to get in. This is the Goal. The Reality would be defined by asking the player to serve 10 balls and seeing how many first serves went in.

Gallwey would then ask awareness-raising questions such as "What do you notice you are doing differently when the ball goes in or out?" This question would enable players to discover for themselves what was changing about their mind and body when the serve went in or out. They had then defined their Obstacles and Options. They therefore learned for themselves what had to change in order to meet their serving targets and they had a clear Way Forward.

The originators of both the Inner Game method and the GROW method suggested that many individuals were struggling to achieve goals because they were not learning from experience and were not aware of the available knowledge that would help them.

== Limitations ==
Jonathan Passmore and Stefan Cantore suggested in 2012 that one "argument against behavioural-based approaches such as GROW is that their goal nature excludes the potential to explore philosophical aspects of life. Thus GROW may be suited to working in goal-directed areas of sports or business, but may be less well suited to careers conversations, person–role fit or life-coaching conversations where other approaches such as the transpersonal or existential approaches may be more helpful." See also Whitmore, Kauffman & David (2013) for a response to this criticism suggesting that GROW has evolved to include transpersonal goals.

== See also ==
- Decision cycle – other models of decision making
- Decisional balance sheet – a matrix showing the costs and benefits of different options
- Decision-making § GOFER – a model for teaching decision-making to adolescents
- Immunity to change – a method of analyzing and overcoming psychological obstacles to goals
- SMART criteria – criteria for composing goals
- SOAP note – a tool for documenting a patient's progress in the health professions
- Transtheoretical model – another model of intentional change
