= 1965 British Saloon Car Championship =

8th season of the British Touring Car Championship

Seasons
- ← 1964 1966 →

The 1965 BRSCC British Saloon Car Championship, was the eighth season of the championship. The title was won by Roy Pierpoint in a Ford Mustang, competing in his debut season.

== Calendar & Winners ==
All races were held in the United Kingdom. Overall winners in bold.

Round		Circuit	Date	Class A Winner	Class B Winner	Class C Winner	Class D Winner
1		Brands Hatch, Kent	13 March	(United Kingdom) Warwick Banks	(United Kingdom) John Rhodes	(United Kingdom) Andre Baldet	(United Kingdom) **Roy Pierpoint**
2		Oulton Park, Cheshire	3 April	(United Kingdom) Warwick Banks	(United Kingdom) John Rhodes	(Australia) Frank Gardner	(United Kingdom) **Roy Pierpoint**
3		Snetterton Motor Racing Circuit, Norfolk	10 April	(United Kingdom) Warwick Banks	(United Kingdom) John Rhodes	(Australia) Frank Gardner	(United Kingdom) **Mike Salmon**
4		Goodwood Circuit, West Sussex	19 April	(United Kingdom) Mike Campbell-Cole	(United Kingdom) John Handley	(United Kingdom) **Jim Clark**	(United Kingdom) Roy Pierpoint
5		Silverstone Circuit, Northamptonshire	15 May	(United Kingdom) Warwick Banks	(United Kingdom) Tony Lanfranchi	(United Kingdom) Jack Sears	(United Kingdom) **Roy Pierpoint**
6	A	Crystal Palace Circuit, London	7 June	Not contested.		(United Kingdom) Jim Clark	(United Kingdom) **Roy Pierpoint**
6	B	Crystal Palace Circuit, London	7 June	(United Kingdom) John Fitzpatrick	(United Kingdom) **John Rhodes**	Not contested.	
NC		Silverstone Circuit, Northamptonshire	10 July	Not contested.	(United Kingdom) John Lewis	(United Kingdom) Jack Sears* (United Kingdom) John Whitmore*	(United Kingdom) **Gawaine Baillie**
7		Brands Hatch, Kent	30 August	(United Kingdom) Warwick Banks	(United Kingdom) John Cannadine	(United Kingdom) Jack Sears	(Australia) **Jack Brabham**
8		Oulton Park, Cheshire	18 September	(United Kingdom) Warwick Banks	(United Kingdom) John Rhodes	(United Kingdom) **Jim Clark**	(United Kingdom) Roy Pierpoint

- Dead heat.

== Championship results ==
Driver's championship
Pos.	Driver	Car	Points
1	(United Kingdom) Roy Pierpoint	Ford Mustang	48
2	(United Kingdom) Warwick Banks	Austin Mini Cooper S 970	48
3	(United Kingdom) John Rhodes	Austin Mini Cooper S Morris Mini Cooper S	40
4	(United Kingdom) Jack Sears	Ford Cortina Lotus	38
5	(Australia) Frank Gardner	Ford Cortina Lotus	34
6	(United Kingdom) Sir Gawaine Baillie	Ford Mustang	24

Lombank Saloon Car Championship Entrants' Trophy
Pos.	Entrant
1	Weybridge Engineering Company
2	Cooper Car Co.
3	Cooper Car Co.
4	Team Lotus
5	John Willment Automobiles
6	Gawaine Baillie
