= Alan Fine (writer) =

Author, executive coach, consultant, and speaker

Personal details
- Born: June 12, 1953 (age 72)
- Occupation: Trainer, speaker, and performance expert
- Website: www.alan-fine.com

Alan Fine (born June 12, 1953) is an author, executive coach, consultant, and speaker. Fine began his career as a tennis coach in the United Kingdom. In the late 1970s he worked with Graham Alexander and Sir John Whitmore using Timothy Gallwey’s Inner Game theory as part of their coaching process. An outcome of their work was the development of the GROW model (Goal, Reality, Options, Way Forward).

Fine has coached athletes in Europe and the United States. They include Davis Cup tennis team member Buster Mottram, Professional Golfers' Association (PGA) member Stephen Ames, CBS golf commentator and Ryder Cup participant David Feherty, and PGA European Tour members Colin Montgomerie, Phillip Price, Paul Lawrie, Bradley Dredge and David Llewellyn. He has also worked with Professional Squash player Phil Kenyon, the British Olympic Fencing Team, and the Welsh Amateur Golf Team.

In 1985, Fine founded a professional-training and organizational-consulting firm, InsideOut Development, LLC. At InsideOut, he consults with individuals and organizations to increase their performance. Additionally, he provides executive coaching and leadership training. Fine’s firm trains more than 25,000 people annually on his coaching process. The company was recently recognized as one of Training Industry's Top 20 leadership training companies.

Fine is the New York Times bestselling author of You ALREADY Know How to Be GREAT: A Simple Way to Remove Interference and Unlock Your Greatest Potential. He also authored Golf: Play to Win with David Feherty and InsideOut Golf, and is a contributing author to Coaching for Leadership by the Drucker Foundation. In addition, Fine has contributed articles to Forbes, The New York Daily News, The Globe and Mail, Golf World, Golf International and other publications. In February 2012, "You ALREADY Know How to Be GREAT" was featured by the 12 Books Group as the featured book of the month. https://mndaily.com/209488/opinion/candidates-records-important/

== Bibliography ==
- Golf (Play to win) (Octopus Books Limited, 1987) ISBN 0-7064-2862-5
- InsideOut Golf (InsideOut Development, 1999) ISBN 0-9672530-0-4
- You Already Know How to Be Great (Portfolio Hardcover, 2010) ISBN 1-59184-355-3
