= 1966 British Saloon Car Championship =

9th season of the British Touring Car Championship

Seasons
- ← 1965 1967 →

The 1966 BRSCC British Saloon Car Championship was the ninth season of the series. Group 5 regulations were introduced to the championship this year. The title was won by John Fitzpatrick in a class A Ford Anglia.

== Calendar & Winners ==
All races were held in the United Kingdom. Overall winners in bold.

Round		Circuit	Date	Class A Winner	Class B Winner	Class C Winner	Class D Winner
1		Snetterton Motor Racing Circuit, Norfolk	8 April	(United Kingdom) John Fitzpatrick	(United Kingdom) Chris Craft	(United Kingdom) Jim Clark	(Australia) **Jack Brabham**
2		Goodwood Circuit, West Sussex	11 April	(United Kingdom) John Fitzpatrick	(United Kingdom) Chris Craft	(United Kingdom) Jim Clark	(Australia) **Brian Muir**
3		Silverstone Circuit, Northamptonshire	14 May	(United Kingdom) Anita Taylor	(United Kingdom) Mike Young	(United Kingdom) Peter Arundell	(United Kingdom) **John Whitmore**
4	A	Crystal Palace Circuit, London	30 May	(United Kingdom) John Fitzpatrick	(United Kingdom) **John Rhodes**	Not contested.	
4	B	Crystal Palace Circuit, London	30 May	Not contested.		(Belgium) Jacky Ickx	(United Kingdom) **Roy Pierpoint**
NC		Silverstone Circuit, Northamptonshire	7 July	(United Kingdom) Bill McGovern	(United Kingdom) John Rhodes	(United Kingdom) Alan Foster	(United Kingdom) **Roy Pierpoint**
5		Brands Hatch, Kent	16 July	(United Kingdom) John Fitzpatrick	(United Kingdom) Mike Young	(United Kingdom) John Whitmore	(United Kingdom) **Roy Pierpoint**
6		Brands Hatch, Kent	29 August	(United Kingdom) Nick Brittan	(United Kingdom) Mike Young	(United Kingdom) **Jim Clark**	(United Kingdom) Jackie Oliver
7	A	Oulton Park, Cheshire	17 September	(United Kingdom) John Fitzpatrick	(United Kingdom) **Chris Craft**	Not contested.	
7	B	Oulton Park, Cheshire	17 September	Not contested.		(United Kingdom) **Jim Clark**	(United Kingdom) Gawaine Baillie
8		Brands Hatch, Kent	30 October	(United Kingdom) John Fitzpatrick	(United Kingdom) Mike Young	(United Kingdom) Peter Arundell	(United Kingdom) **Jackie Oliver**

== Championship results ==
Drivers’ championship
Pos.	Driver	Car	Team	Class	Points
1	(United Kingdom) John Fitzpatrick	Ford Anglia	Team Broadspeed	A	50
2	(United Kingdom) John Rhodes	Austin Mini Cooper S	Cooper Car Co.	B	50
3	(United Kingdom) Peter Arundell	Ford Cortina Lotus	Team Lotus	C	38
4	(United Kingdom) Mike Young	Ford Anglia Super	Superspeed Conversions Ltd	B	36
5	(United Kingdom) Jim Clark	Ford Cortina Lotus	Team Lotus	C	34
5	(United Kingdom) Sir Gawaine Baillie	Ford Falcon Sprint	Gawaine Baillie	D	34
7	(United Kingdom) Ray Calcutt	Hillman Imp	Alan Fraser Racing Team	A	28
8	(United Kingdom) Chris Craft	Ford Anglia Super	Superspeed Conversions Ltd.	B	24
8	(United Kingdom) Nick Brittan	Hillman Imp	Alan Fraser Racing Team	A	24

Lombank Saloon Car Championship Entrants' Trophy
Pos.	Entrant	Points
1	Team Lotus	64
2	Team Broadspeed	62
3	Superspeed Conversions	56
4	Cooper Car Co.	50
