= John Whitmore (racing driver) =

British racing driver (1937–2017)

Sir John Whitmore
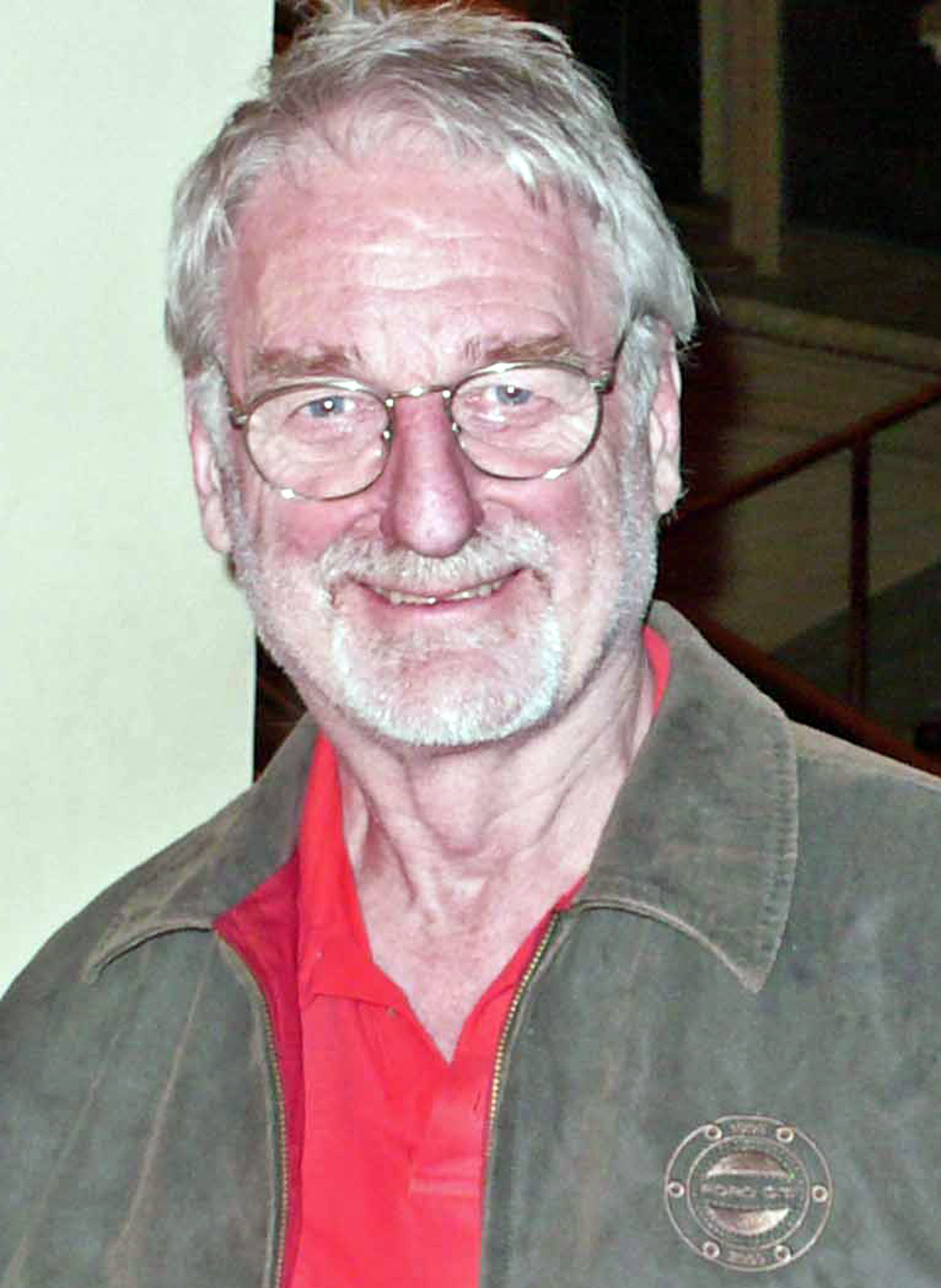
- Whitmore in 2007
- Nationality: English
- Born: John Henry Douglas Whitmore; 16 October 1937
- Died: 28 April 2017 (aged 79)
- Years active: 1959–1966 (racing) and 1979–2017 (coaching)

Previous series
- 1959–1966 1961–1963 1965: 24 Hours of Le Mans; British Saloon Car Championship; European Touring Car Championship

Championship titles
- 1961 1961, 1963 1965: British Saloon Car Championship; BSCC - Class A European Touring Car Championship

Sir John Henry Douglas Whitmore, 2nd Baronet (16 October 1937 – 28 April 2017) was a pioneer of the executive coaching industry, an author and British racing driver.

== Family life and background ==
John Whitmore was born on 16 October 1937, the son of Sir Francis Whitmore and Ellis Johnsen. He was educated at Eton College, Royal Military Academy Sandhurst and Cirencester Agricultural College. He inherited The Orsett Estate Company at Orsett, Essex, in 1962, on the death of his father. The inheritance included the family seat of Orsett Hall, from the grounds of which he used to take off and land his plane. In 1968, he sold the house to his friends, Tony and Val Morgan. He married twice, first to Ella Gunilla Hansson, from whom he was divorced in 1969, and later to Diana Becchetti. He had a child from each marriage. He died on 28 April 2017.

== Early career (in motor racing) ==
In his first year in the competition, 1961, Whitmore won the British Saloon Car Championship in his BMC Mini Minor. In 1963 he drove again in the BSCC and came second in the championship in a Mini Cooper, finishing just two points behind Jack Sears. In 1965 he won the European Touring Car Championship in a Lotus Cortina (KPU392C). He won by finishing first in his class in eight of the nine 1965 ETCC races (and finishing first overall in six of the races).

Sir John drove in the 24 Hours of Le Mans for five years between 1959 and 1966. In the first year he finished tenth overall and second in class along with Jim Clark in the Border Reivers Lotus Elite. In 1965 (with Innes Ireland) and 1966 (with Frank Gardner), he raced in a works Ford GT40, but had to retire from the race both years with mechanical problems. At the end of 1966, he retired from racing. He returned later in life to driving in historic car events such as the Goodwood Revival.

== Racing record ==
=== Complete British Saloon Car Championship results ===
(key) (Races in bold indicate pole position; races in italics indicate fastest lap.)

Year	Team	Car	Class	1	2	3	4	5	6	7	8	9	10	11	DC	Pts	Class
1961	Don Moore Racing	Austin Mini Seven	A	SNE	GOO ?	AIN ?	SIL ?	CRY; 9	SIL; 4	BRH; Ret	OUL; 8	SNE ?			**1st**	**53**	**1st**
1962	Cooper Car Co.	Austin Mini Cooper	A	SNE ?	GOO; Ret	AIN; 12	SIL; 8	CRY; 6	AIN; 10	BRH	OUL'				8th	29	**2nd**
1963	Cooper Car Co.	Austin Mini Cooper	A	SNE; 16	OUL ?	GOO; 9	AIN ?	SIL; 5	**CRY**; 1†	SIL; 7	BRH; 7	BRH; 4	OUL	SNE; 7	**2nd**	**69**	**1st**
1964	Team Lotus	Ford Cortina Lotus	B	SNE	GOO	OUL; 3	AIN	SIL	CRY	BRH	OUL				17th	6	5th
1965	Team Lotus	Ford Cortina Lotus	C	BRH	OUL; Ret	SNE	GOO	SIL	CRY	BRH	OUL				NC	0	NC
1966	Alan Mann Racing	Ford Falcon Sprint	D	SNE	GOO	**SIL**; 1	CRY								16th	16	7th
1966	Team Lotus	Ford Cortina Lotus	C					BRH; 4	BRH	OUL	BRH				16th	16	6th

† Events with 2 races staged for the different classes.

=== Complete 24 Hours of Le Mans results ===
Year	Team	Co-drivers	Car	Class	Laps	Pos.	Class pos.
1959	(United Kingdom) Border Reivers	(United Kingdom) Jim Clark	Lotus Elite Mk.14-Climax	GT; 1.5	257	10th	**2nd**
1960	(United Kingdom) Team Lotus Engineering	(United Kingdom) Innes Ireland	Lotus Elite Mk.14-Climax	S 2.0	-	DNA	DNA
1962	(United Kingdom) Ecurie Chiltern	(South Africa) Bob Olthoff	Austin-Healey 3000	GT; 3.0	212	DNF	DNF
1963	(United Kingdom) Donald Healey Motor Company	(South Africa) Bob Olthoff	Austin-Healey Sebring Sprite	P 1.15	94	DNF	DNF
1965	(United Kingdom) Ford Advanced Vehicles	(United Kingdom) Innes Ireland	Ford GT40	GT; 5.0	72	DNF	DNF
1966	(United Kingdom) Alan Mann Racing	(Australia) Frank Gardner	Ford GT40 Mk.II	P +5.0	31	DNF	DNF

== Later career (in business and coaching) ==
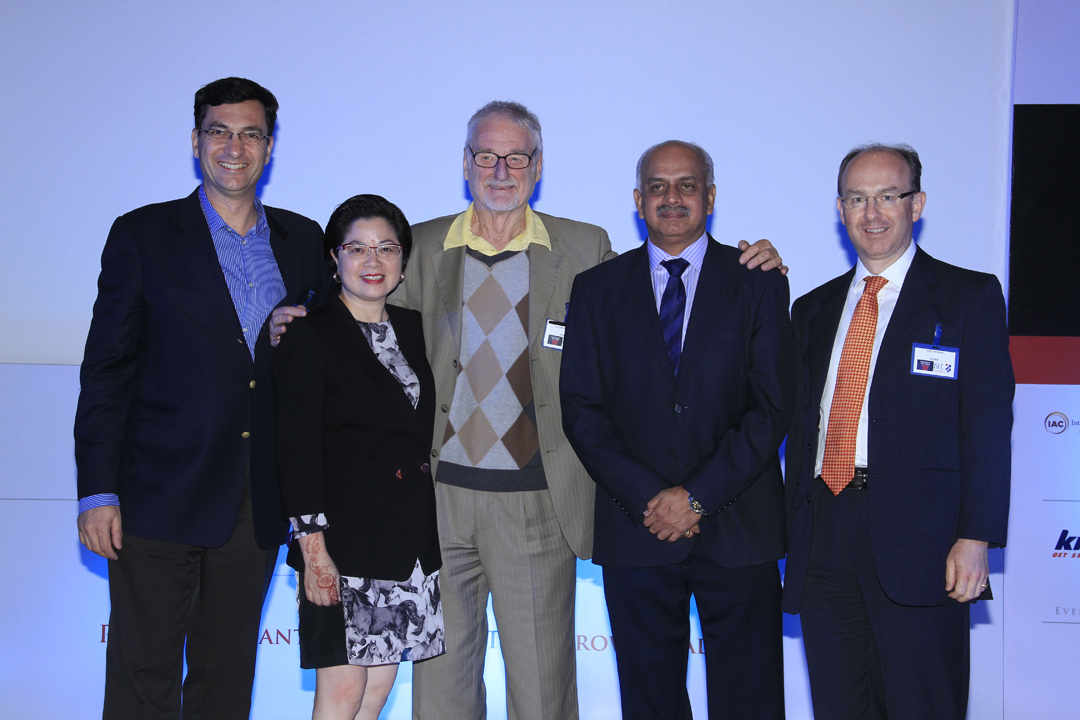
Sir John Whitmore receiving a Lifetime Achievement Award from the International Association of Coaching

After leaving racing and the world of motor-sports, he became interested in transpersonal psychology and its emphasis on the principle of will, intention, or responsibility. He went on to apply his learning and skills first to the world of sport and then to business. In 1970, he studied at the Esalen Institute in Slates Hot Springs, California, with the likes of William Schutz (creator of team development model FIRO-B), and then trained with Harvard educationalist and tennis expert Timothy Gallwey, who created the Inner Game methodology of performance coaching.

Sir John founded the Inner Game in Britain in 1979 with a small team of Inner Game coaches trained by Gallwey. Initially they coached tennis players and golfers but they soon realized the value for leaders and managers of organizations. At this point Sir John coined the term "performance coaching" - this was the birth of the modern coaching movement as we know it.

In the early 1980s he and partners founded Performance Consultants, a provider of coaching, leadership development and performance improvement. Sir John and his colleagues spent much of the 1980s developing the methodology, concepts, and techniques for performance improvement in organizations and showed it was possible to improve performance, increase learning and enjoyment, and find a sense of purpose in work.

Sir John is regarded as a pioneer in the field of business coaching. Along with Tim Gallwey, Laura Whitworth and Thomas J. Leonard, he is credited with launching modern coaching in the 1970s. For some, Sir John will be best known as the co-creator of the GROW model, an established and successful coaching model. He has presented at numerous conferences around the world and contributed to many other books such as Challenging Coaching and Coaching at Work.

In the 1990s, Sir John was a co-founder, along with Eric Parsloe, David Clutterbuck, David Megginson and Julie Hay, of the European Mentoring and Coaching Council (EMCC).

Sir John was involved with the Professional and Personal Coaches Association (PPCA), an organization that merged in 1998 with the International Coach Federation (ICF). He served as a Trustee for the ICF Foundation until his death in 2017.

== Awards ==
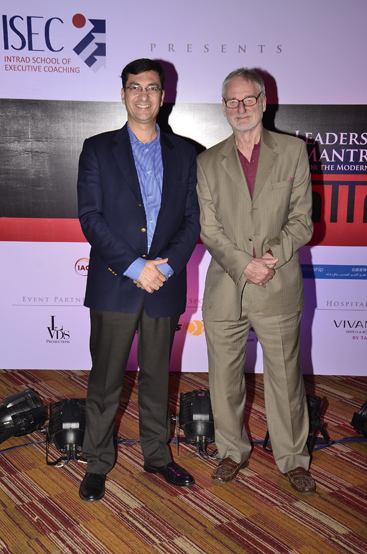
Sir John Whitmore with coach & author Nigel Cumberland

Whitmore received a number of awards outside his career in motor racing, including:

- A Lifetime Achievement Award from the International Association of Coaching ("IAC") in 2013, presented to him by the IAC President, Krishna Kumar; and

== Bibliography ==
Whitmore wrote a book titled Coaching for Performance. published by Nicholas Brealey Publishing. It contains details of his coaching model, known as the GROW model. The first four editions sold a million copies in 23 languages. The fifth edition was published in 2017.

Whitmore also wrote the foreword to and is extensively quoted in a book called Nine: Briefing from Deep Space which was published in 2005. The book is based upon interviews with extraterrestrial beings which a group of people including Whitmore, as well as Phyllis Schlemmer and Uri Geller, claimed to have had over a number of years. The book and Whitmore himself have been quoted and spoken about on a number of websites which explore such claims. During the 1970s, Whitmore commissioned Star Trek creator Gene Roddenberry to write a script for a movie that he was intending to fund called The Nine, but the deal fell through.

== Media coverage ==
Sir John has been interviewed numerous times. Some examples include:

- By Coaching at Work magazine
- At the European Commission
- In Coaching Magazine
- In a journal titled Coaching: An International Journal of Theory, Research and Practice

Sporting positions
Preceded by Doc Shepherd	British Touring Car Champion; 1961	Succeeded by John Love
Baronetage of the United Kingdom
Preceded by Francis Whitmore	Baronet (of Orsett, Essex); 1962–2017	Succeeded by Jason Whitmore
