= Alan Fine =

Alan Fine may refer to:

- Alan Fine (executive) (born 1951), American President of Marvel Entertainment
- Alan Fine (writer) (born 1953), author, executive coach, consultant, and speaker
