= Warwick Banks =

British racing driver (born 1939)

- Nationality: (United Kingdom) British
- Born: 12 July 1939 (age 87) Spalding, Lincolnshire, England

British Saloon Car Championship
- Years active: 1962, 1964–1965
- Teams: Postland Engineering & Trading Co. Don Moore; Cooper Car Co.
- Starts: 12
- Wins: 0 (6 in class)
- Poles: 0
- Fastest laps: 4
- Best finish: 2nd in 1965

Championship titles
- 1964 1965: European Touring Car Championship; British Saloon Car Championship - Class A

Warwick Banks (born 12 July 1939) is a British former racing driver. He was a race winner in British Formula Three for Tyrrell Racing during the 1960s and was teammate of Jackie Stewart during his first season in 1964. He won the European Touring Car Championship in 1964, and in 1965, he finished runner-up in the British Saloon Car Championship with a class-winning Austin Mini Cooper S.

== Racing record ==
=== Complete British Saloon Car Championship results ===
(key) (Races in bold indicate pole position; races in italics indicate fastest lap.)

| Year | Team | Car | Class | 1 | 2 | 3 | 4 | 5 | 6 | 7 | 8 | DC | Pts | Class |
|---|---|---|---|---|---|---|---|---|---|---|---|---|---|---|
| 1962 | Postland Engineering & Trading Co. | Vauxhall VX4/90 | B | SNE | GOO | AIN | SIL ? | CRY | AIN; 22 | BRH | OUL | NC | 0 | NC |
| 1964 | Don Moore | Austin Mini Cooper S | A | SNE< | GOO; 13 | OUL ? | AIN | SIL | CRY | BRH | OUL | 27th | 2 | 12th |
| 1965 | Cooper Car Co. | Austin Mini Cooper S | A | BRH; 12 | OUL; 10 | SNE; 13 | GOO; Ret | SIL ? | CRY; Ret† | BRH; 12 | OUL; 10 | **2nd** | **48** | **1st** |

† Events with 2 races staged for the different classes.
