= Alan Mann Racing =

British auto racing team

Alan Mann Racing was a British motor racing team organised by Alan Mann (22 August 1936 – 21 March 2012), who was a part-time racing driver and team manager. The team ran a substantial part of the Ford works racing effort in Europe from 1964 to 1969, when it ceased operations. It was based in Byfleet, Surrey, near the Brooklands race circuit.

== History ==
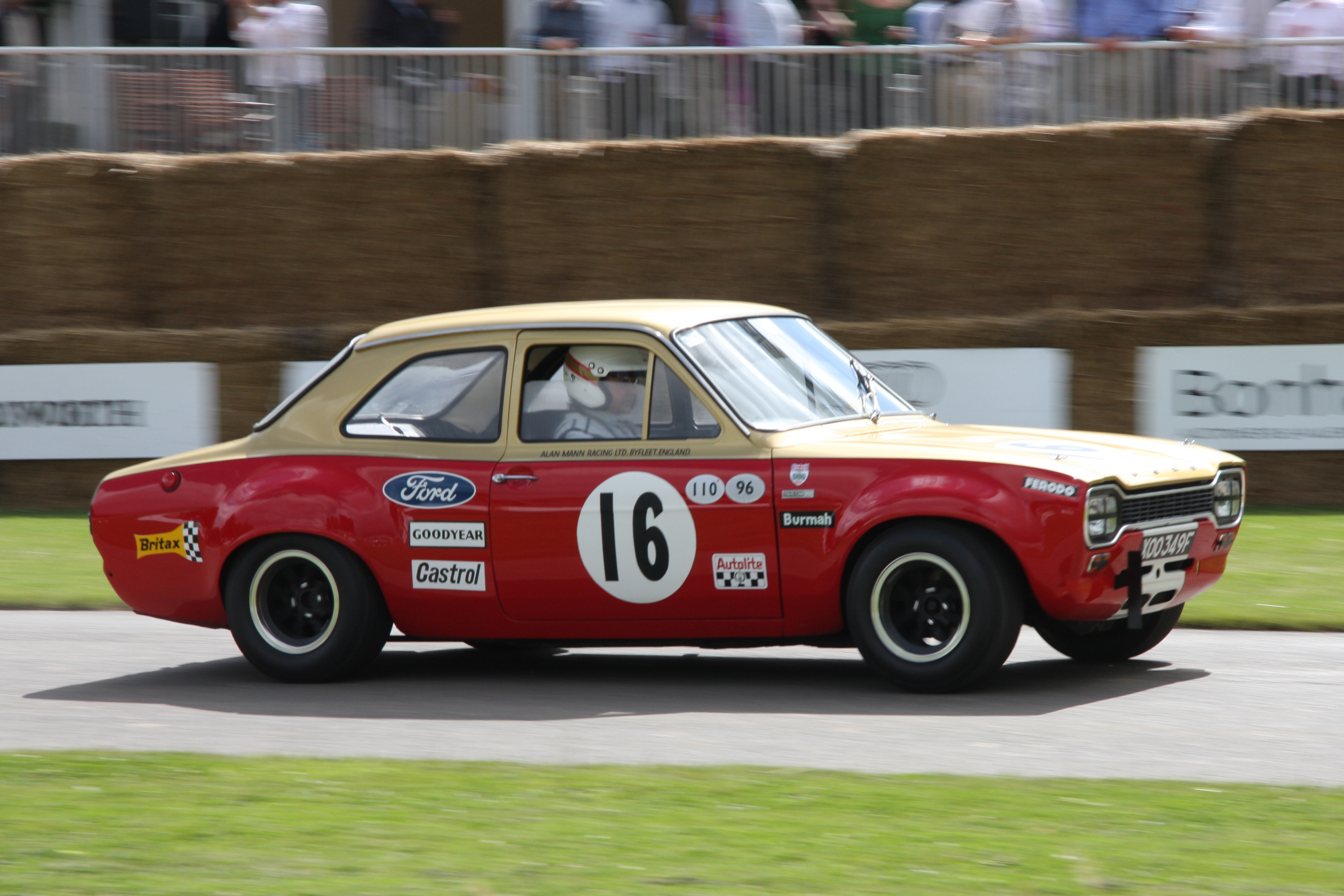
Ford Escort Twin Cam in Alan Mann Racing livery

Alan Mann ran Ford Zephyrs and Anglias in 1962 under the entrant of Andrews Garage in British saloon car races. In 1963, he prepared a Ford Cortina GT under Alan Andrews Racing for Henry Taylor in racing and rallying in a quasi-Ford Team.

His team was included to run a Ford Cortina GT in the third running of the Marlboro 12-hour, at Marlboro Motor Raceway, US, in August 1963, with the express purpose of winning its class, as Volvo was reaping publicity from a string of victories. His Cortina, driven by Henry Taylor and Jimmy Blumer, came in second to another Cortina of John Willment Automobiles driven by Jack Sears and Bob Olthoff, which won the race overall. This made an impression on John Holman of Holman and Moody, Ford's top racing team in the US, who had already sold Willment a Ford Galaxie, and this subsequently attracted more of Ford's attention.

For 1964, Alan Mann Racing became a Ford factory team. The team ran cars in events as diverse as the Monte Carlo Rally and the Tour de France Automobile to the 24 Hours of Le Mans. Shelby won the Over 2000cc division of the 1965 International Championship for GT Manufacturers with Cobra Daytona and Cobra roadster models entered by various teams, including Alan Mann Racing. For the big Ford effort to win Le Mans in 1966, Alan Mann Racing developed a lightweight version of the GT40 with a light alloy body and other modifications. Five cars were ordered, but only two were built, as the project was abandoned by Ford in favour of the MKII GT40. Alan Mann Racing entered two 7-litre MKII cars for Le Mans in 1966, but despite one of them leading early on in the race, both cars retired.

The team's red and gold livery graced various Ford models, including GT40, Cortina, Falcon, and Escort. The Ford F3L prototype was built and raced by Alan Mann Racing. Some of the best drivers of the period from Graham Hill and Sir Jackie Stewart to Sir John Whitmore and Frank Gardner raced for the team, which achieved substantial successes in many different forms of the sport.

== Film work ==
AMR also was involved in film and TV work. The company built the original Chitty Chitty Bang Bangs for the film of the same name. Work was also done for the James Bond film Goldfinger, the aborted Steve McQueen F1 film Day of the Champion, and preproduction work for McQueen's film Le Mans.

They also built three cars with a "futuristic" appearance, based on Ford Zephyr running gear and aluminium gullwing door bodyshells, for Gerry Anderson and the 1969 film Doppelgänger. These were repainted and reused for the much better known UFO TV series of 1970. The cars were unfinished, underpowered and unreliable. Ed Straker's car was later owned by DJ Dave Lee Travis, who disliked it. Little survives of these cars, except for enough remains to build a modern replica.

== Major victories ==
- 1964 Tour de France Automobile, Touring Division – won by Peter Procter and Andrew Cowan in a Ford Mustang entered by AMR
- 1965 International Championship for GT Manufacturers, Over 2000cc Division – won by Shelby, with cars entered by various teams including AMR
- 1965 European Touring Car Challenge – won by Sir John Whitmore in a Ford Cortina Lotus entered by AMR
- 1967 British Saloon Car Championship – won by Frank Gardner in a Ford Falcon Sprint entered by AMR
- 1968 British Saloon Car Championship – won by Frank Gardner in a Ford Cortina Lotus and a Ford Escort Twin Cam entered by AMR

The team was resurrected in 2004 by Alan Mann, and is active in historic racing - featuring in such events as the Silverstone Classic, the Goodwood Festival of Speed, and the Goodwood Revival, and regular appearances on the Masters Historic Pre-1966 Touring Cars competition.

== See also ==
- Roy Pierpoint
