= 1964 British Saloon Car Championship =

7th season of the British Touring Car Championship

Seasons
- ← 1963 1965 →

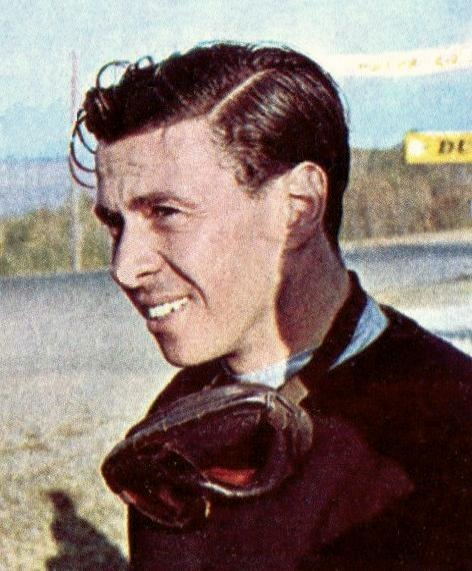
The drivers' championship was won by Jim Clark, driving a Lotus Cortina.

The 1964 BRSCC British Saloon Car Championship, was the seventh season of the championship. It started on 14 March at Snetterton and finished on 19 September at Oulton Park. The title was won by 1963 Formula One champion Jim Clark.

== Calendar and results ==
All races were held in the United Kingdom. Overall winners of multi-class races in bold.

Round		Circuit	Date	Class A Winner	Class B Winner	Class C Winner	Class D Winner
1		Snetterton Motor Racing Circuit, Norfolk	14 March	(United Kingdom) John Fitzpatrick	(United Kingdom) Jim Clark	(United Kingdom) John Sparrow	(Australia) **Jack Brabham**
2		Goodwood Circuit, West Sussex	30 March	(United Kingdom) Mike Young	(United Kingdom) Jim Clark	None (drivers disqualified)	(United Kingdom) **Jack Sears**
3		Oulton Park, Cheshire	11 April	(United Kingdom) Mike Young	(United Kingdom) **Jim Clark**	(United Kingdom) Chris McLaren	(United Kingdom) Gawaine Baillie
4		Aintree Motor Racing Circuit, Liverpool	18 April	(United Kingdom) John Fitzpatrick	(United Kingdom) Jim Clark	(United Kingdom) John Sparrow	(United Kingdom) **Jack Sears**
5		Silverstone Circuit, Northamptonshire	2 May	(United Kingdom) Paddy Hopkirk	(United Kingdom) Jim Clark	(United Kingdom) Chris McLaren	(United Kingdom) **Jack Sears**
6	A	Crystal Palace Circuit, London	18 May	(United Kingdom) John Handley	Not contested.		
6	B	Crystal Palace Circuit, London	18 May	Not contested.	(United Kingdom) **Jim Clark**	(United Kingdom) Royston Carpenter	(United Kingdom) Gawaine Baillie
NC		Brands Hatch, Kent	11 July	(United Kingdom) John Fitzpatrick	(United Kingdom) **John Whitmore**	Not contested.	
7		Brands Hatch, Kent	3 August	(United Kingdom) John Rhodes	(United Kingdom) Jim Clark	(United Kingdom) Chris McLaren	(United Kingdom) **Jack Sears**
8		Oulton Park, Cheshire	19 September	(United Kingdom) John Rhodes	(United Kingdom) **Jim Clark**	(United Kingdom) Chris McLaren	(Australia) Jack Brabham

== Championship results ==
Driver's championship
Pos.	Driver	Car	Points
1	(United Kingdom) Jim Clark	Ford Cortina Lotus	48
2	(United Kingdom) John Fitzpatrick	Morris Mini Cooper S	38
3	(United Kingdom) Mike Young	Ford Anglia Super	30
4	(United Kingdom) Chris McLaren	Jaguar Mk II 3.8	26
5	(South Africa) Bob Olthoff	Ford Cortina Lotus	24
5	(United Kingdom) Peter Arundell	Ford Cortina Lotus	24
5	(United Kingdom) Sir Gawaine Baillie	Ford Galaxie	24
