= 1963 British Saloon Car Championship =

6th season of the British Touring Car Championship

Seasons
- ← 1962 1964 →

The 1963 BRSCC British Saloon Car Championship was a British motor racing series for Group 2 Touring Cars. The championship was contested over eleven races commencing on 30 March at Snetterton and concluding on 28 September at the same circuit. It was the sixth British Saloon Car Championship.

The championship was won by Jack Sears driving a Ford Cortina GT, a Ford Galaxie and a Ford Cortina Lotus.

== Calendar & Winners ==
All races were held in the United Kingdom. Overall winners of multi-class races are shown below in bold.

Round		Circuit	Date	Class A Winner	Class B Winner	Class C Winner	Class D Winner
1		Snetterton Motor Racing Circuit, Norfolk	30 March	(United Kingdom) Mick Clare (Morris Mini Cooper)	(United Kingdom) Peter Harper (Sunbeam Rapier Series IIIA)	None (no entries?)	(United Kingdom) **Roy Salvadori** (Jaguar Mk II 3.8)
2		Oulton Park, Cheshire	6 April	(United Kingdom) John Whitmore (Austin Mini Cooper)	(United Kingdom) Jack Sears (Ford Cortina GT)	None (no entries?)	(United Kingdom) **Graham Hill** (Jaguar Mk II 3.8)
3		Goodwood Circuit, West Sussex	15 April	(United Kingdom) John Whitmore (Austin Mini Cooper)	(United Kingdom) Jack Sears (Ford Cortina GT)	None (no entries)	(United Kingdom) **Graham Hill** (Jaguar Mk II 3.8)
4		Aintree Motor Racing Circuit, Liverpool	27 April	(United Kingdom) John Whitmore (Austin Mini Cooper)	(United Kingdom) Jack Sears (Ford Cortina GT)	None (no entries?)	(United Kingdom) **Graham Hill** (Jaguar Mk II 3.8)
5		Silverstone Circuit, Northamptonshire	11 May	(United Kingdom) John Whitmore (Austin Mini Cooper S)	(United Kingdom) Jimmy Blumer (Ford Cortina GT)	None (no entries?)	(United Kingdom) **Jack Sears** (Ford Galaxie)
6	A	Crystal Palace Circuit, London	3 June	(United Kingdom) John Whitmore (Austin Mini Cooper S)	Not contested.		
6	B	Crystal Palace Circuit, London	3 June	Not contested.	(United Kingdom) Jimmy Blumer (Ford Cortina GT)	None (no entries)	(United Kingdom) **Jack Sears** (Ford Galaxie)
7		Silverstone Circuit, Northamptonshire	20 July	(United Kingdom) John Whitmore (Austin Mini Cooper S)	(South Africa) Bob Olthoff (Ford Cortina GT)	(United Kingdom) Alan Mann (Ford Zodiac Mk 3)	(United Kingdom) **Jack Sears** (Ford Galaxie)
8		Brands Hatch, Kent	5 August	(United Kingdom) John Whitmore (Austin Mini Cooper S)	(South Africa) Bob Olthoff (Ford Cortina GT)	None (no entries)	(United Kingdom) **Jim Clark** (Ford Galaxie)
9		Brands Hatch, Kent	14 September	(United Kingdom) John Whitmore (Austin Mini Cooper S)	(United Kingdom) Jack Sears (Ford Cortina Lotus)	None (no entries)	(South Africa) **Bob Olthoff** (Ford Galaxie)
10		Oulton Park, Cheshire	21 September	(United Kingdom) Edward Lewis (Morris Mini Cooper S)	(United Kingdom) Jack Sears (Ford Cortina Lotus)	None (no entries)	(United States) **Dan Gurney** (Ford Galaxie)
11		Snetterton Motor Racing Circuit, Norfolk	28 September	(United Kingdom) John Whitmore (Austin Mini Cooper S)	(United Kingdom) Jim Clark (Ford Cortina GT)	None (no entries?)	(Australia) **Jack Brabham** (Ford Galaxie)

Note: Cars competed in four classes:

- Class A: Up to 1300cc
- Class B: 1301 to 2000cc
- Class C: 2001 to 3000cc
- Class D: Over 3000cc

== Championship results ==
Pos.	Driver	Car	Points
1	(United Kingdom) Jack Sears	Ford Cortina GT; Ford Galaxie; Ford Cortina Lotus	71
2	(United Kingdom) John Whitmore	Austin Mini Cooper; Austin Mini Cooper S	69
3	(United Kingdom) Graham Hill	Jaguar Mk II 3.8; Ford Galaxie	49
4	(United Kingdom) Roy Salvadori	Jaguar Mk II 3.8; Ford Galaxie	38
5	(United Kingdom) Jimmy Blumer	Ford Cortina GT	33
6	(United Kingdom) Paddy Hopkirk	Morris Mini Cooper; Morris Mini Cooper S	30
7	(South Africa) Bob Olthoff	Ford Cortina GT	28
=	(United Kingdom) Christabel Carlisle	Morris Mini Cooper; Morris Mini Cooper S	28
9	(United Kingdom) Peter Harper	Sunbeam Rapier Series IIIA	23
10	(United Kingdom) David Haynes	Ford Cortina GT	22
