= Surtees TS10 =

Racing car

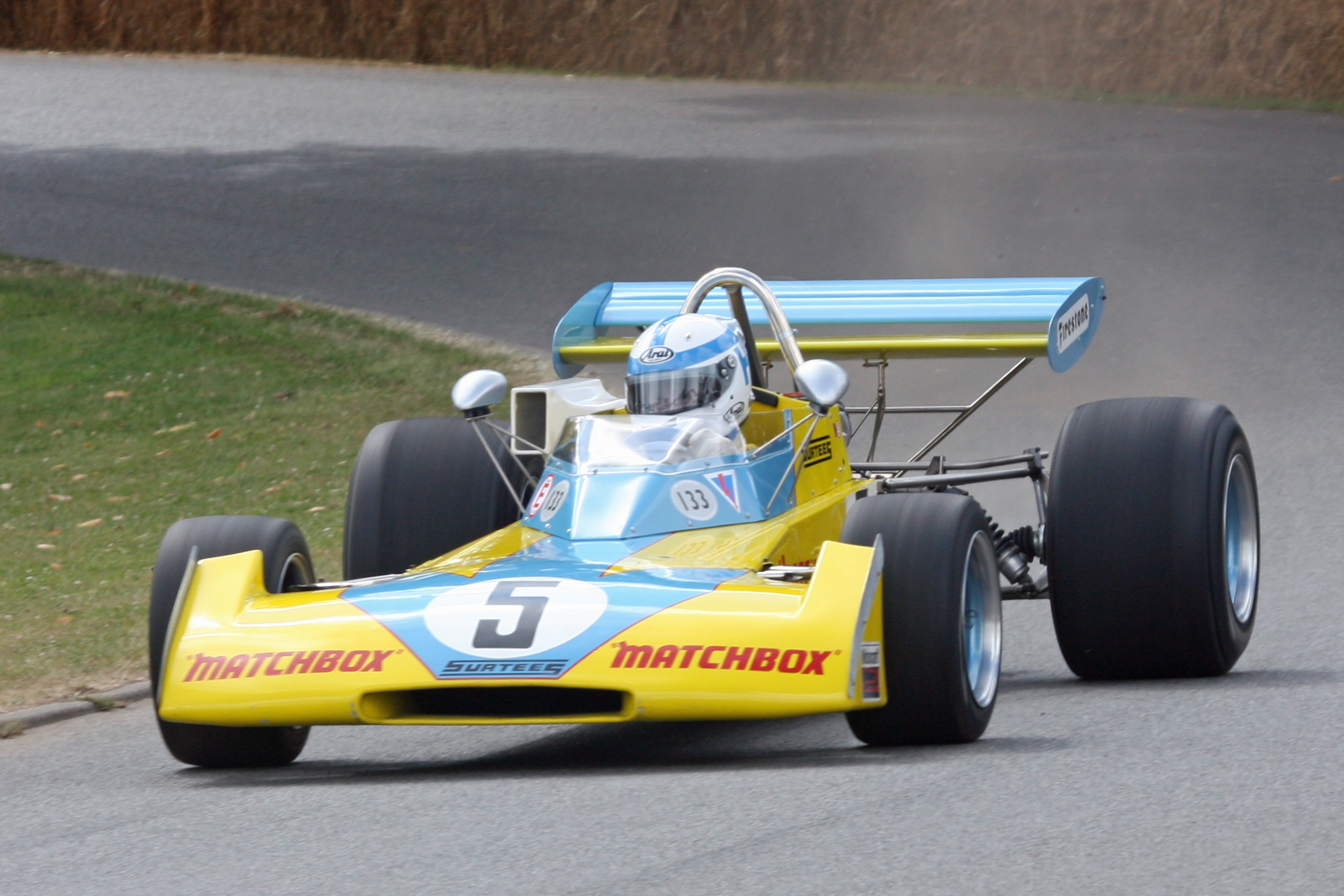
- Constructor: Surtees

Technical specifications
- Chassis: Aluminum Monocoque
- Suspension (front): Double wishbones, coil springs over dampers, anti-roll bar
- Suspension (rear): Twin lower links, Single top links, twin trailing arms, Coil springs over Dampers, Anti-roll bar
- Wheelbase: 2,413 mm (95.0 in)
- Engine: Cosworth BDA/Hart 420S, 1.85 L (112.9 cu in), L4, DOHC, mid-engined, NA
- Transmission: Hewland F.G. 400 5-speed manual
- Power: 265 hp (198 kW)
- Weight: 460 kg (1,010 lb)
- Tires: Firestone

Competition history
- Debut: 1972
Wins	Podiums
5	11

The Surtees TS10 is an open-wheel Formula 2 race car, designed, developed and built by Surtees, for the European Formula Two Championship, in 1972. Briton Mike Hailwood won the championship outright that season, with 55 points, after scoring 8 podium finishes, with 5 of those podiums being race wins. It was powered by a 1.85 L (113 cu in) Ford-Cosworth BDA four-cylinder engine, tuned by Brian Hart, to produce 265 hp (198 kW).
