= 1967 British Saloon Car Championship =

10th season of the British Touring Car Championship

Seasons
- ← 1966 1968 →

The 1967 BRSCC British Saloon Car Championship, was the tenth season of the championship. Australian Frank Gardner, driving a Ford Falcon Sprint, won the first of his three BSCC titles.

== Calendar and winners ==
All races were held in the United Kingdom. Overall winners in bold.

Round		Circuit	Date	Class A Winner	Class B Winner	Class C Winner	Class D Winner
1		Brands Hatch, Kent	12 March	(United Kingdom) Bernard Unett	(United Kingdom) John Rhodes	(United Kingdom) Graham Hill	(Australia) **Frank Gardner**
2		Snetterton Motor Racing Circuit, Norfolk	24 March	(United Kingdom) John Fitzpatrick	(United Kingdom) John Handley	(United Kingdom) Graham Hill	(United Kingdom) **Jackie Oliver**
3		Silverstone Circuit, Northamptonshire	27 March	(United Kingdom) John Fitzpatrick	(United Kingdom) Mike Young	(United Kingdom) Graham Hill	(United Kingdom) **Jackie Oliver**
4		Silverstone Circuit, Northamptonshire	29 April	(United Kingdom) John Fitzpatrick	(United Kingdom) John Rhodes	(United Kingdom) Vic Elford	(Australia) **Frank Gardner**
5	A	Mallory Park, Leicestershire	14 May	(United Kingdom) John Fitzpatrick	(United Kingdom) **John Rhodes**	Not contested.	
5	B	Mallory Park, Leicestershire	14 May	Not contested.		(Belgium) Jacky Ickx	(Australia) **Frank Gardner**
6		Silverstone Circuit, Northamptonshire	20 May	(United Kingdom) Bernard Unett	(United Kingdom) John Handley	(Australia) Paul Hawkins	(Australia) **Frank Gardner**
7		Silverstone Circuit, Northamptonshire	15 July	(United Kingdom) Bernard Unett	(United Kingdom) Steve Neal	(Australia) Paul Hawkins	(Australia) **Frank Gardner**
8		Brands Hatch, Kent	28 August	(United Kingdom) John Fitzpatrick	(United Kingdom) Mike Young	(Belgium) Jacky Ickx	(United Kingdom) **Jackie Oliver**
9	A	Oulton Park, Cheshire	16 September	(United Kingdom) John Fitzpatrick	(United Kingdom) **John Rhodes**	Not contested.	
9	B	Oulton Park, Cheshire	16 September	Not contested.		(United Kingdom) Vic Elford	(Australia) **Frank Gardner**
10		Brands Hatch, Kent	29 October	(United Kingdom) John Fitzpatrick	(United Kingdom) John Handley	(United Kingdom) Brian Robinson	(Australia) **Frank Gardner**

== Championship results ==
Drivers' championship
Pos.	Driver	Car	Points
1	(Australia) Frank Gardner	Ford Falcon Sprint	70
2	(United Kingdom) John Fitzpatrick	Ford Anglia	62
3	(United Kingdom) John Rhodes	Morris Mini Cooper S	58
4	(United Kingdom) Jackie Oliver	Ford Mustang	54
5	(United Kingdom) Bernard Unett	Hillman Imp	54
