= Timothy Gallwey =

American sports coach

W. Timothy Gallwey
- Occupations: Author, tennis coach
- Writing career
- Notable work: The Inner Game of Tennis (1974)

W. Timothy Gallwey (born 12 August 1938 in San Francisco) is an author who has written a series of books in which he has set forth a methodology for coaching and for the development of personal and professional excellence in a variety of fields that he calls "the Inner Game". Since he began writing in the 1970s, his books include The Inner Game of Tennis, The Inner Game of Golf, The Inner Game of Music (with Barry Green), Inner Skiing and The Inner Game of Work. Gallwey's seminal work is The Inner Game of Tennis, with more than one million copies in print.

== Career ==
In 1960, Gallwey was captain of the Harvard University Tennis Team. He served as a training officer on the USS Topeka in the early 1960s. In the 1970s he learned meditation techniques which Gallwey said enhanced his powers of concentration in a manner that improved his game.

=== Inner game ===
The "inner game" is based upon certain principles in which an individual uses non-judgmental observations of critical variables, with the purpose of being accurate about these observations. If the observations are accurate, the person's body will adjust and correct automatically to achieve best performance. Gallwey was one of the first to demonstrate a comprehensive method of coaching that could be applied to many situations, and found himself lecturing more often to business leaders in the U.S. than to sports people.

== Books ==
- Gallwey, W. Timothy (1974). The Inner Game of Tennis (1st ed.). New York: Random House. ISBN 0-394-49154-8.
- Gallwey, W. Timothy. (1976). Inner tennis : playing the game. New York: Random House. ISBN 0-394-40043-7.
- Gallwey, W. Timothy; Kriegel, Robert J. (1977). Inner skiing (1st ed.). New York: Random House. ISBN 0-394-42048-9.
- Gallwey, W. Timothy (1981). The Inner Game of Golf (1st ed.). New York: Random House. ISBN 0-394-50534-4.
- Gallwey, W. Timothy (1985). Inner Game of Winning. Listen USA. ISBN 0-88684-064-3.
- Green, Barry; Gallwey, W. Timothy (1986). The inner game of music (1st ed.). New York: Anchor Press/Doubleday. ISBN 0-385-23126-1.
- Gallwey, W. Timothy. (1999). The Inner Game of Work. New York: Random House. ISBN 0-375-50007-3.
- Gallwey, W. Timothy. (2009). The Inner Game of Stress: Outsmart Life's Challenges, Fulfill Your Potential, Enjoy Yourself. New York: Random House. ISBN 978-1-4000-6791-6.
