= Crystal Palace Circuit =

Former motor racing track in London, England

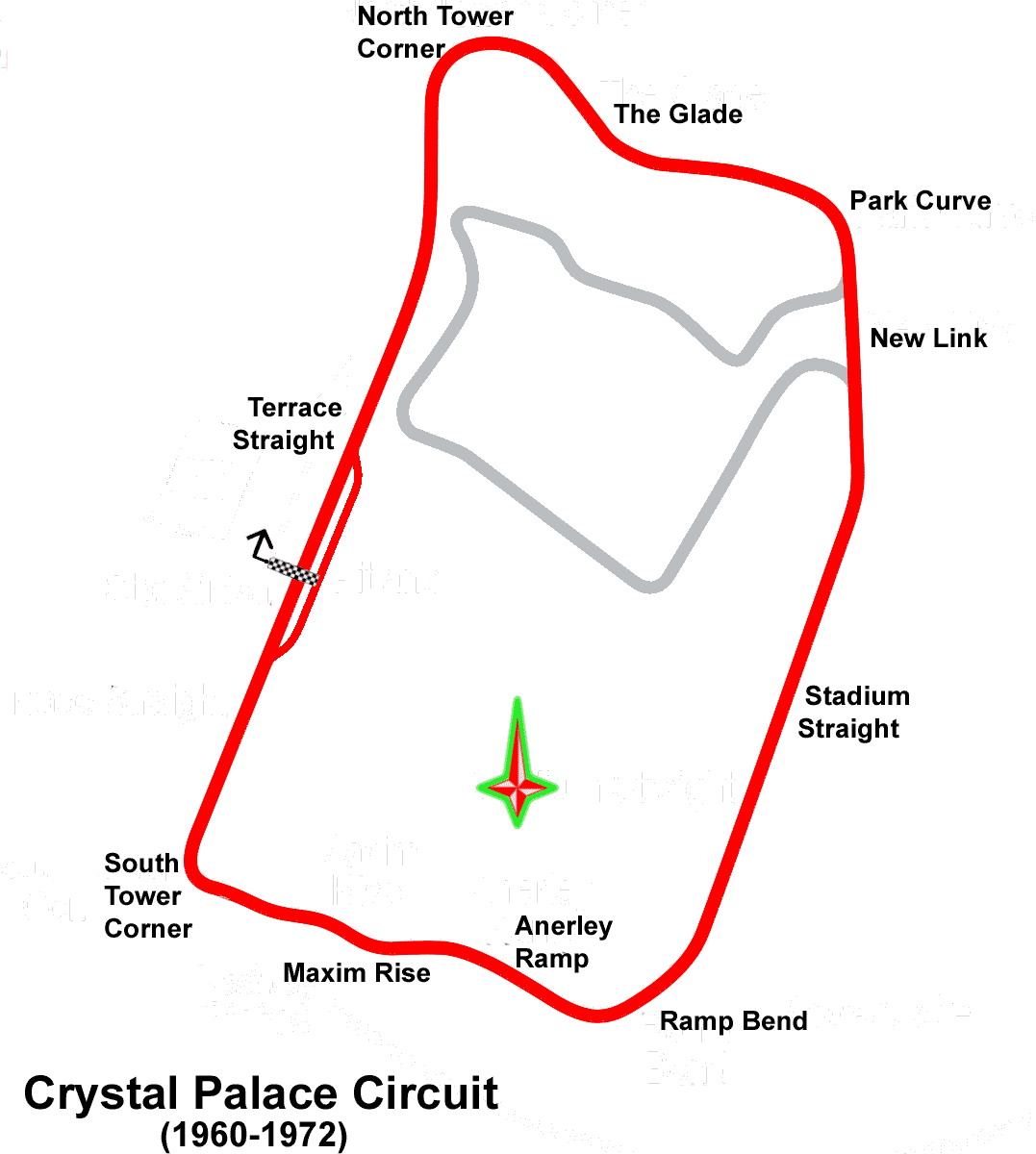
- Post-war Circuit (1953–1972)

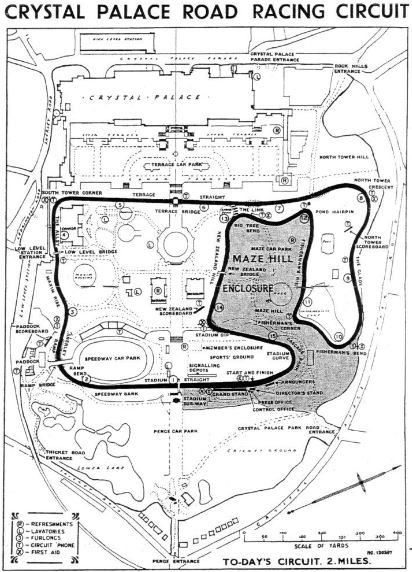
- Pre-war Circuit (1937–1939)
- Location: Crystal Palace Park, London, United Kingdom
- Coordinates: 51°25′17″N 0°4′10″W
- Opened: 21 May 1927; 99 years ago
- Closed: 1974
- Major events: Formula One (non-championship); Formula Two; London Grand Prix (motorsport); London Trophy; BTCC; British Formula Three; Sports car racing

Post-war Circuit (1953–1972)
- Length: 2.240 km (1.392 mi)
- Race lap record: 0:48.400 ( (United Kingdom) Mike Hailwood, Surtees TS10, 1972, F2)

Pre-war Circuit (1937–1939)
- Length: 3.219 km (2.000 mi)
- Race lap record: 2:11.900 ( (United Kingdom) Pat Fairfield, ERA C-Type, 1937, Voiturette)

Crystal Palace Circuit is a former motor racing circuit in Crystal Palace Park in the Crystal Palace area of south London, England. The route of the track is still largely extant but the roads are now mainly used for access to the Crystal Palace National Sports Centre located in the park, and to events within the upper parts of Crystal Palace Park. Some parts of the track are closed off but part is used for an annual Sprint Meeting held on the Spring Bank Holiday weekend, until 2017, when it was held on the August holiday weekend.

== History ==
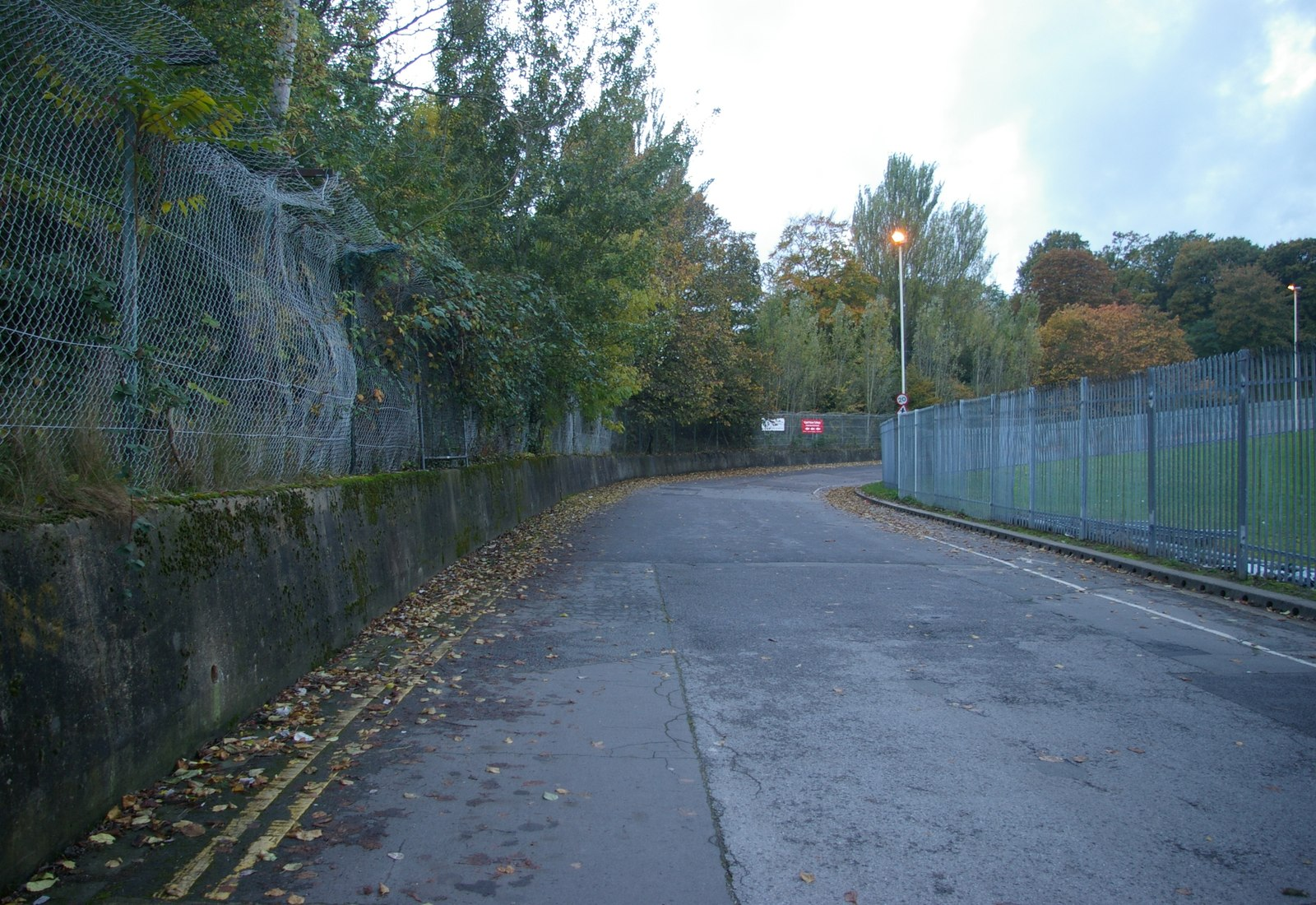
Part of the back straight, seen in 2005; looking towards Ramp Bend (this part of the circuit was used as the start/finish straight up until 1960)

The circuit opened in 1927 and the first race, for motorcycles, was on 21 May 1927. The circuit was 1 mi (1.6 km) long, and ran on existing paths through the park, including an infield loop past the lake. The surface had tarmac-covered bends, but the straights only had hard-packed gravel.

Improvements begun in December 1936 increased the circuit to 2.000 mi (3.219 km), and tarmac covered the entire length. 20 cars entered the first London Grand Prix on 17 July 1937, a race eventually won by Prince Bira in his ERA R2B Romulus at an average speed of 54.36 mph (87.48 km/h). Later that year, during the International Imperial Trophy meeting also won by Bira, the BBC broadcast the first ever televised motor racing.

With the outbreak of World War II, the park was taken over by the Ministry of Defence, and it would not be until 1953 that race meetings could take place again. The circuit had been reduced in length to 1.390 mi (2.237 km), bypassing the loop past the lake, and pressure from the local residents led to an injunction which reduced motor sport events in the park to only five days per year. A variety of races took place, including sports cars, Formula Three, the London Trophy for Formula Two, and non-championship Formula One races.

Average speeds continued to rise over the years, with the first 100 mph (160 km/h) lap average set in 1970 by that year's Formula One world champion, Jochen Rindt. Also in 1970, the injunction limiting race days expired and racing was increased to 14 days a year. However, driver safety was coming into focus in the early 1970s and it became clear that racing around a park at 100 mph (160 km/h) was not safe. Expensive improvements were undertaken, but it was not enough to save the circuit. The last International meeting was in May 1972, the final lap record going to Mike Hailwood at an average speed of 103.39 mph (166.39 km/h).

The final meeting was held on 23 September 1972, but club events still continued until the circuit's final closure in 1974.

== Other uses ==
The circuit's location within Greater London made it a popular venue for both film and television settings. The Italian Job filmed on the startline at Crystal Palace for the scene showing initial testing of the Mini Cooper getaway cars and in the paddock area for the scene where a security van is "blown up". The Crystal Palace transmitter tower can be seen in the background of this scene. The circuit was also used in Ron Howard's film Rush, to recreate the last corner accident between James Hunt and Dave Morgan, and for parts of the UFO episode "The Responsibility Seat".

The first known contemporary motion picture having captured the postwar Crystal Palace circuit is Joseph Losey's 1957 film noir classic, Time Without Pity, featuring driver Leo McKern lapping in a Mercedes 300 SL coupé.

Although the circuit no longer exists (as an actual racing circuit), it can be driven virtually in the Grand Prix Legends historical motor racing computer simulation game, for which it was recreated in detail. It was later converted to several other racing simulation programs, including the popular rFactor.

The circuit was used for the prologue time trial of the Tour of Britain cycle race on 9 September 2007, and is used regularly for summer road race league events, normally held on Tuesday evenings.

== Racing today ==
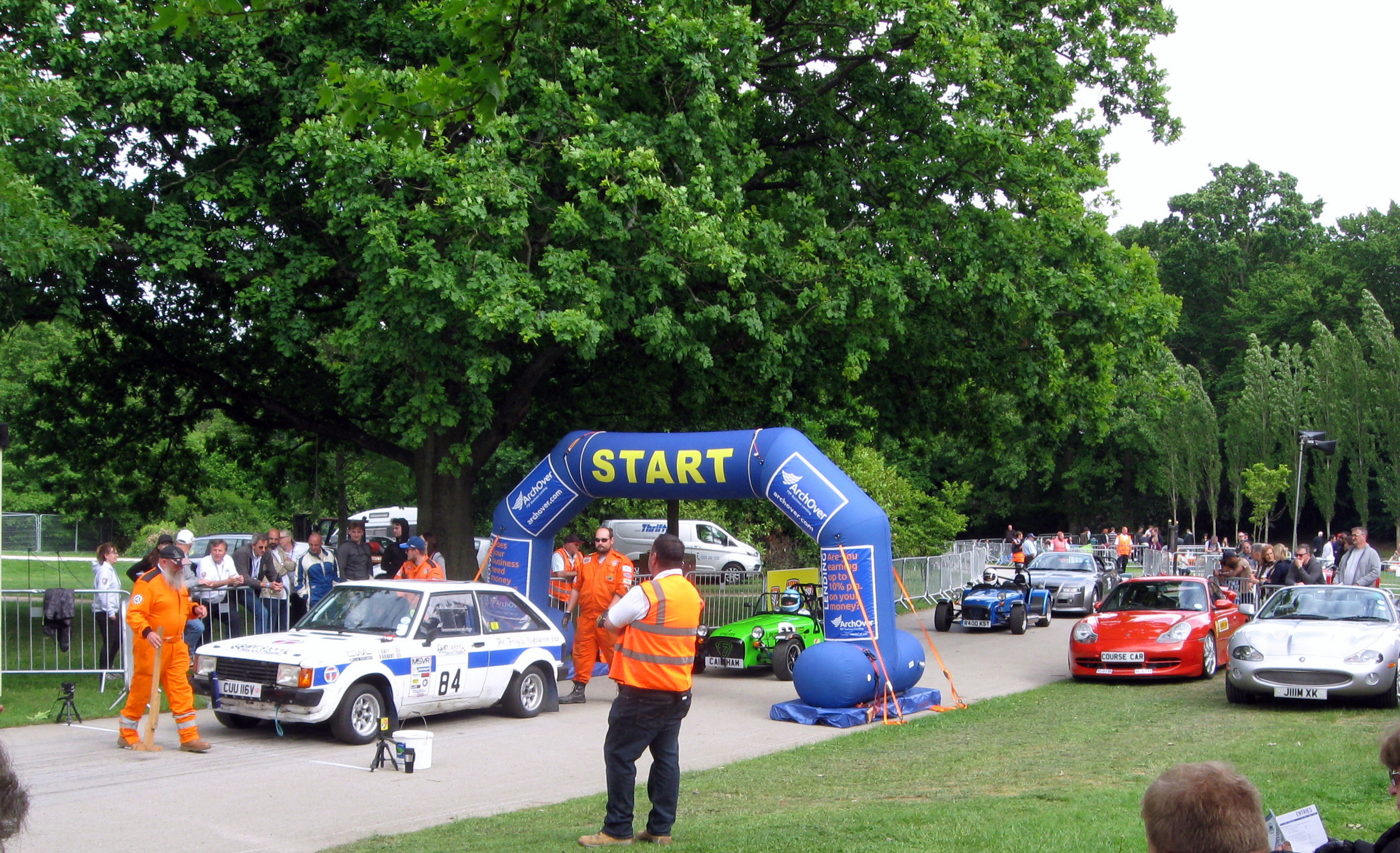
The start line at the 2019 sprint event

In 1997, the Sevenoaks & District Motor Club started a series of sprint events. The event was attended by some of the star drivers and cars from the past; Bentleys, Bugattis, Ferraris, Porsches, Jaguars and many Lotuses raced the circuit once more. The latter marque even chose one of these Palace events to reveal its latest sports car. The events lasted three years before being stopped due to park development work. Following discussions with local council and the London Development Agency, sprint racing again started at the park, with the two-day event held 30–31 May 2010. This event was repeated on the same or adjacent weekend each year, until 2017, when it was held on the August Bank Holiday weekend. The event was suspended in 2018 but took place in May 2019. It was scheduled to take place again in May 2020 but was cancelled due to the COVID-19 pandemic. The event was also suspended in 2021 and 2022.

== Lap records ==
The fastest official race lap records at Crystal Palace circuit are listed as:

Category	Time	Driver	Vehicle	Event
Post-war circuit (1953–1972): 1.392 mi (2.240 km)
Formula Two	0:48.400	Mike Hailwood	Surtees TS10	1972 Crystal Palace European F2 round
Sports 2000	0:51.800	Terry Croker (Note: All three drivers took the same lap time independently.); Jeremy Lord; Guy Edwards	Lola T210; Lola T212; Lola T212	1971 Crystal Palace MN GT race
Formula Three	0:53.000	Jody Scheckter	Merlyn MK 21	1971 Crystal Palace British F3 round
Group 4	0:54.600	Frank Gardner	Lola T70 Mk.III GT	1967 Crystal Palace B.A.R.C. GT race
Formula One	0:57.200	Innes Ireland	Lola Mk4	1962 Crystal Palace Trophy
Group 3	1:00.300	David Piper	Ferrari 250LM	1965 Crystal Palace Grand Touring race
Pre-war circuit (1937–1939): 1.994 mi (3.209 km)
Voiturette	2:11.900	Pat Fairfield	ERA C-Type	1937 Crystal Palace Voiturette race

== See also ==
- Crystal Palace National Sports Centre
- Herne Hill Velodrome
- Hillingdon Cycle Circuit
- Redbridge Cycling Centre
